= 1987–88 AC Milan season =

AC Milan
1987–88 season
- Owner: Silvio Berlusconi
- President: Silvio Berlusconi
- Manager: Arrigo Sacchi
- Stadium: San Siro
- Serie A: 1st (In 1988–89 European Cup)
- Coppa Italia: Round of 16
- UEFA Cup: Round of 32
- Top goalscorer: League: Paolo Virdis (11); All: Virdis (15)
- Average home league attendance: 72,177
Home colours	Away colours
- All statistics correct as of 15 May 1988.

During the 1987–88 season, Milan Associazione Calcio competed in Serie A, Coppa Italia and UEFA Cup.

== Summary ==
Silvio Berlusconi appointed Arrigo Sacchi as the new head coach, who in the previous season with Parma had faced Milan in the Coppa Italia three times and subsequently eliminated the Rossoneri, in the process impressing Berlusconi with the team's style of play. The transfer market brought two Dutch players to Milan: Marco van Basten and Ruud Gullit, taken respectively from Ajax and PSV, in place of the English Ray Wilkins and Mark Hateley. Angelo Colombo and Carlo Ancelotti joined in midfield. The coach from Fusignano could thus count on a young squad, which could allow him to fight in the league against reigning champions Napoli. The squad was already made up of a strong defense led by captain Franco Baresi and which included Paolo Maldini, Filippo Galli, Mauro Tassotti as well as the substitutes Alessandro Costacurta (who will make his debut in the first team during the season) and the new signing Roberto Mussi. Thanks to the play-off won at the end of the 1986–87 season against Sampdoria, the Rossoneri regained access to Europe by participating in the UEFA Cup. Due to the disqualification of the Meazza (because of incidents during the match against Waregem on 11 December 1985), the club decided to play its home games at the Via del mare stadium in Lecce. In the Coppa Italia, Milan got through the first round, finishing their group in second place: they won four matches and lost only one, on penalties, against Parma.

The league began with the victory at Pisa, in which Van Basten (on his debut in Italy) scored the final 3–1 from a penalty kick. Milan then eliminated Sporting de Gijón in the UEFA Cup after losing the first leg 1–0 and winning the second leg 3–0 at the Via del Mare. On the league's fifth day, in the match against Sampdoria, Van Basten suffered an injury that would put him out of action until April. The journey in Europe ended in the next round, against another Spanish team: Espanyol, victorious away, in Lecce (2–0), and capable of imposing a goalless draw at home. Two months after the Dutchman's injury, Milan beat Roma at the San Siro, but the match was later abandoned by the referee due to a firecracker from the Milan stand that had hit the Giallorossi goalkeeper Tancredi. The calendar year ended with a victory in the derby, achieved by beating Inter 1–0: Milan thus had 16 points in the standings, 5 less than leaders Napoli. The first match of 1988 had the challenge against the Neapolitans on the calendar, which the Rossoneri won with an imposing 4–1; the 3–1 goal was scored by Gullit, who had just been awarded the 1987 Ballon d'Or. Three days later, the team defeated Ascoli in the first leg of the round of 16 of the Coppa Italia: in the second leg, the score of 1–0 was overturned by Ascoli who would then win on penalties.

In the second half of the season, in the league, Sacchi's team didn't suffer any setbacks and recovered ground against Napoli. In the 25th round, Van Basten returned to the pitch after six months of absence, and scored the winning goal against Empoli. This success was followed by victories against Roma and Inter, which made it possible to reduce the gap from Napoli to just one point, on the eve of the crucial match. At the San Paolo, Milan defeated the hosts again, this time 3–2 with a double by Virdis and Van Basten, who responded to Maradona and Careca. The result promoted the Rossoneri to first place in the standings, with an advantage of one point. The position was defended in the two remaining games, thanks to draws with Juventus and Como, giving Milan the Scudetto, their eleventh overall, as well as the first after nine years.

== Squad ==
Note: Flags indicate national team as defined under FIFA eligibility rules; some limited exceptions apply. Players may hold more than one non-FIFA nationality.

Pos.	Nation	Player
GK	ITA	Giovanni Galli
GK	ITA	Giulio Nuciari
DF	ITA	Franco Baresi
DF	SUI	Walter Bianchi
DF	ITA	Alessandro Costacurta
DF	ITA	Filippo Galli
DF	ITA	Paolo Maldini
DF	ITA	Roberto Mussi
DF	ITA	Mauro Tassotti
DF	ITA	Rufo Emiliano Verga
MF	ITA	Carlo Ancelotti

Pos.	Nation	Player
MF	ITA	Mario Bortolazzi
MF	ITA	Angelo Colombo
MF	ITA	Roberto Donadoni
MF	ITA	Alberigo Evani
FW	NED	Ruud Gullit
FW	NED	Marco van Basten
FW	ITA	Daniele Massaro
FW	ITA	Pietro Paolo Virdis
FW	ITA	Massimiliano Cappellini
FW	ITA	Graziano Mannari

=== Transfers ===
In
Pos.	Name	from	Type
FW	Marco van Basten	Ajax Amsterdam	–
FW	Ruud Gullit	PSV Eindhoven	–
MF	Carlo Ancelotti	A.S. Roma	
DF	Alessandro Costacurta	Monza	loan ended
MF	Angelo Colombo	Udinese Calcio	
MF	Claudio Borghi	Argentinos Juniors	
DF	Walter Bianchi	Parma F.C.	
MF	Mario Bortolazzi	Parma F.C.	
DF	Roberto Mussi	Parma F.C.	

Out
Pos.	Name	To	Type
FW	Mark Hateley	AS Monaco	–
MF	Ray Wilkins	Paris Saint-Germain	–
MF	Agostino Di Bartolomei	Cesena	–
DF	Catello Cimmino	Como 1907	–
DF	Marco Pullo	Parma F.C.	–
MF	Andrea Manzo	Udinese Calcio	–
MF	Francesco Zanoncelli	Empoli F.C.	–
MF	Claudio Borghi	Como 1907	loan
MF	Giovanni Stroppa	Monza	loan
FW	Giuseppe Galderisi	S.S. Lazio	loan
DF	Dario Bonetti	Hellas Verona	loan
DF	Roberto Lorenzini	Como 1907	loan

== Competitions ==
=== Serie A ===
==== League table ====
Pos	Team	Pld	W	D	L	GF	GA	GD	Pts	Qualification or relegation
1	Milan (C)	30	17	11	2	43	14	+29	45	Qualification to European Cup
2	Napoli	30	18	6	6	55	27	+28	42	Qualification to UEFA Cup
3	Roma	30	15	8	7	39	26	+13	38	Qualification to UEFA Cup
4	Sampdoria	30	13	11	6	41	30	+11	37	Qualification to Cup Winners' Cup
5	Internazionale	30	11	10	9	42	35	+7	32	Qualification to UEFA Cup

Source: 1987–88 Serie A, RSSSF.com
Rules for classification: 1) Points; 2) Head-to-head points; 3) Head-to-head goal difference; 4) Goal difference; 5) Goals scored; 6) Draw.
(C) Champions

==== Results summary ====
Overall								Home						Away					
Pld	W	D	L	GF	GA	GD	Pts	W	D	L	GF	GA	GD	W	D	L	GF	GA	GD
30	17	11	2	43	14	+29	62	10	3	2	25	6	+19	7	8	0	18	8	+10

Source: Competitive matches

==== Results by round ====
Round	1	2	3	4	5	6	7	8	9	10	11	12	13	14	15	16	17	18	19	20	21	22	23	24	25	26	27	28	29	30
Ground	A	H	A	H	A	A	H	A	H	A	H	A	H	A	H	H	A	H	A	H	H	A	H	A	H	A	H	A	H	A
Result	W	L	D	W	D	W	D	W	W	D	L	W	W	W	W	W	D	W	D	W	D	D	W	D	W	W	W	W	D	D
Position	1	6	8	5	5	2	4	3	2	2	4	4	2	2	2	2	2	2	2	2	2	2	2	2	2	2	2	1	1	1

Source: Competitive matches
A = Away; H = Home; W = Win; D = Draw; L = Loss; = 1988–89 European Cup; = 1988–89 UEFA Cup

==== Matches ====
13 September 1987 1	Pisa	1–3	Milan	Pisa
	Cecconi 53'	Report	Donadoni 16'; Gullit 73' van Basten 80' (pen.)	Stadium: Arena Garibaldi; Attendance: 26,728; Referee: Luigi Agnolin

20 September 1987 2	Milan	0–2	Fiorentina	Milan
		Report	Díaz 76'; R. Baggio 78'	Stadium: San Siro; Attendance: 74,880; Referee: Pietro D'elia

27 September 1987 3	Cesena	0–0	Milan	Cesena
		Report		Stadium: Stadio Dino Manuzzi; Attendance: 29,681; Referee: Paolo Bergamo

4 October 1987 4	Milan	2–0	Ascoli	Milan
	Virdis 35'; Evani 82'	Report		Stadium: San Siro; Attendance: 74,928; Referee: Pierluigi Pairetto

11 October 1987 5	Sampdoria	1–1	Milan	Genoa
	Vialli 53'	Report	Gullit 51'	Stadium: Stadio Luigi Ferraris; Attendance: 16,905; Referee: Tullio Lanese

25 October 1987 6	Verona	0–1	Milan	Verona
		Report	Virdis 41'	Stadium: Stadio Marc'Antonio Bentegodi; Attendance: 44,419; Referee: Rosario Lo Bello

1 November 1987 7	Milan	0–0	Torino	Milan
		Report		Stadium: San Siro; Attendance: 72,815; Referee: Luigi Agnolin

8 November 1987 8	Pescara	0–2	Milan	Pescara
		Report	Virdis 28'; Bortolazzi 86'	Stadium: Stadio Adriatico; Attendance: 29,486; Referee: Pierluigi Pairetto

22 November 1987 9	Milan	3–0	Avellino	Milan
	Colombo 6'; Donadoni 67'; Maldini 74'	Report		Stadium: San Siro; Attendance: 68,536; Referee: Werther Cornieti

29 November 1987 10	Empoli	0–0	Milan	Empoli
		Report		Stadium: Stadio Carlo Castellani; Attendance: 13,955; Referee: Salvatore Lombardo

13 December 1987 11	Milan	0–2 (abd)	Roma	Milan
	Virdis 83' (pen.)	Report		Stadium: San Siro; Attendance: 70,887; Referee: Pietro D'Elia
Note: The win was awarded to Roma due to a firecracker that hit the Giallorossi's goalkeeper Franco Tancredi at the start of the second half. He was hit on the head by a firework thrown by a A.C. Milan supporter. Tancredi stopped breathing for a short time but was eventually resuscitated by paramedics.

20 December 1987 12	Inter	0–1	Milan	Milan
		Report	Ferri 4' (o.g.)	Stadium: San Siro; Attendance: 67,545; Referee: Tullio Lanese

3 January 1988 13	Milan	4–1	Napoli	Milan
	Colombo 19'; Virdis 24'; Gullit 73'; Donadoni 78'	Report	Careca 10'	Stadium: San Siro; Attendance: 75,519; Referee: Luigi Agnolin

10 January 1988 14	Juventus	0–1	Milan	Turin
		Report	Gullit 62'	Stadium: Stadio Comunale di Torino; Attendance: 59,376; Referee: Carlo Longhi

17 January 1988 15	Milan	5–0	Como	Milan
	Donadoni 30'; Virdis 49'; Gullit 61', 88'; Ancelotti 73'	Report		Stadium: San Siro; Attendance: 68,947; Referee: Werther Cornieti

24 January 1988 16	Milan	1–0	Pisa	Milan
	Colombo 27'	Report		Stadium: San Siro; Attendance: 70,523; Referee: Pierluigi Pairetto

31 January 1988 17	Fiorentina	1–1	Milan	Florence
	Di Chiara 49'	Report	Baresi 74' (pen.)	Stadium: Stadio Comunale (Florence); Attendance: 52,068; Referee: Gianluca Paparesta

7 February 1988 18	Milan	3–0	Cesena	Milan
	Gullit 13'; Evani 72'; Massaro 83'	Report		Stadium: San Siro; Attendance: 68,512; Referee: Luciano Luci

14 February 1988 19	Ascoli	1–1	Milan	Ascoli Piceno
	Destro 47'	Report	Massaro 66'	Stadium: Stadio Cino e Lillo Del Duca; Attendance: 22,678; Referee: Werther Cornieti

28 February 1988 20	Milan	2–1	Sampdoria	Milan
	Virdis 7'; Maldini 70'	Report	Bonomi 16' (pen.)	Stadium: San Siro; Attendance: 72,568; Referee: Luigi Agnolin

6 March 1988 21	Milan	0–0	Verona	Milan
		Report		Stadium: San Siro; Attendance: 71,208; Referee: Salvatore Lombardo

13 March 1988 22	Torino	1–1	Milan	Turin
	Bresciani 77'	Report	Ancelotti 78'	Stadium: Stadio Comunale di Torino; Attendance: 38,857; Referee: Rosario Lo Bello

20 March 1988 23	Milan	2–0	Pescara	Milan
	Massaro 2'; Gullit 47'	Report		Stadium: San Siro; Attendance: 71,336; Referee: Fabio Baldas

27 March 1988 24	Avellino	0–0	Milan	Avellino
		Report		Stadium: Stadio Partenio; Attendance: 39,898; Referee: Carlo Longhi

10 April 1988 25	Milan	1–0	Empoli	Milan
	van Basten 61'	Report		Stadium: San Siro; Attendance: 72,763; Referee: Rosario Lo Bello

17 April 1988 26	Roma	0–2	Milan	Rome
		Report	Virdis 25'; Massaro 85'	Stadium: Stadio Olimpico; Attendance: 59,455; Referee: Pierluigi Pairetto

24 April 1988 27	Milan	2–0	Internazionale	Milan
	Gullit 43'; Virdis 53'	Report		Stadium: San Siro; Attendance: 75,503; Referee: Carlo Longhi

1 May 1988 28	Napoli	2–3	Milan	Naples
	Maradona 45'; Careca 78'	Report	Virdis 36', 68' van Basten 76'	Stadium: Stadio San Paolo; Attendance: 82,824; Referee: Rosario Lo Bello

8 May 1988 29	Milan	0–0	Juventus	Milan
		Report		Stadium: San Siro; Attendance: 75,505; Referee: Tullio Lanese

15 May 1988 30	Como	1–1	Milan	Como
	Giunta 46'	Report	Virdis 2'	Stadium: Stadio Giuseppe Sinigaglia; Attendance: 25,036; Referee: Sergio Coppetelli

=== Coppa Italia ===
First round

23 August 1987 1	Milan	5–0	Bari	Milan
	Donadoni 3'; Virdis 21' van Basten 55'; Gullit 57'; Massaro 70'			Stadium: San Siro; Attendance: 27 962; Referee: Pairetto

26 August 1987 2	Como	1–2	Milan	Como
	Borgonovo 67'		8' Gullit; 36' van Basten	Stadium: Giuseppe Sinigaglia; Attendance: 17 000; Referee: Bergamo

30 August 1987 3	Monza	0–2	Milan	Milan
			12', 83' van Basten	Stadium: San Siro; Attendance: 44 568; Referee: Luci

2 September 1987 4	Milan	2–2 (3–4 p)	Parma	Milan
	van Basten 15'; Gullit 80'		42' Zannoni; 58' (o.g.) F. Galli	Stadium: San Siro; Attendance: 44 179; Referee: Coppetelli
	Penalties
	van Basten (penalty scored); Bortolazzi (penalty missed); Donadoni (penalty missed); Baresi (penalty scored); Ancelotti (penalty scored)		(penalty scored) Zannoni; (penalty scored) Carboni; (penalty scored) Pasa; (penalty missed) Di Fabio; (penalty scored) Fiorin

6 September 1987 5	Barletta	1–1 (3–5 p)	Milan	Bari
	Bonaldi 87'		59' Donadoni	Stadium: Stadio della Vittoria; Attendance: 10 000; Referee: Baldas
	Penalties
	Di Sarno (penalty missed); Cossato (penalty scored); Mazzaferro (penalty scored); Rovani (penalty scored)		(penalty scored) van Basten; (penalty scored) Baresi; (penalty scored) Ancelotti; (penalty scored) Colombo; (penalty scored) Donadoni

Eightfinals

6 January 1988	Milan	0–1	Ascoli	Milan
			59' Destro	Stadium: San Siro; Attendance: 13 808; Referee: Paparesta

20 January 1988	Ascoli	0–1 (4–2 p)	Milan	Ascoli Piceno
			9' Virdis	Stadium: Cino e Lillo Del Duca; Attendance: 14 910; Referee: D'Elia
	Penalties
	Giovannelli (penalty scored); Casagrande (penalty missed); Greco (penalty scored); Benetti (penalty scored); Destro (penalty scored)		(penalty missed) Virdis; (penalty scored) Bortolazzi; (penalty missed) Donadoni; (penalty scored) Baresi

=== UEFA Cup ===
First round

16 September 1987	Sporting Gijon (Spain)	1–0	(Italy) Milan	Gijón
	Jaime 69'	Report		Stadium: El Molinon; Attendance: 26 000; Referee: (Wales) Bridges

30 September 1987	Milan (Italy)	3–0	(Spain) Sporting Gijon	Lecce
	Virdis 21' (pen.), 45' (pen.); Gullit 43'	Report		Stadium: Stadio Via del Mare; Attendance: 35,488; Referee: (Socialist Federal Republic of Yugoslavia) Petrović

Second round

21 October 1987	Milan (Italy)	0–2	(Spain) RCD Español	Lecce
		Report	40' Zubillaga; 49' Pichi Alonso	Stadium: Stadio Via del Mare; Attendance: 29 102; Referee: (Scotland) Syme

4 November 1987	RCD Español (Spain)	0–0	(Italy) Milan	Barcelona
		Report		Stadium: Sarria; Attendance: 30 000; Referee: (Belgium) Ponnet

== Statistics ==
=== Squad statistics ===
Competition	Points	Home						Away						Total						GD
Competition	Points	G	W	D	L	Gs	Ga	G	W	D	L	Gs	Ga	G	W	D	L	Gs	Ga	GD
1987-88 Serie A	45	15	10	3	2	25	6	15	7	8	0	18	8	30	17	11	2	43	14	+29
1987-88 Coppa Italia	–	3	1	1	1	7	3	4	3	1	0	6	2	7	4	2	1	13	5	+8
1987-88 UEFA Cup	–	2	1	0	1	3	2	2	0	1	1	0	1	4	1	1	2	3	3	0
Total	–	20	12	4	4	35	11	21	10	10	1	24	11	41	22	14	5	59	22	+37

=== Players statistics ===
No.	Pos	Nat	Player	Total		Serie A		Coppa Italia		UEFA Cup	
No.	Pos	Nat	Player	Apps	Goals	Apps	Goals	Apps	Goals	Apps	Goals
	GK	(Italy) ITA	G. Galli	40	-12	30	-12	7	0	3	0
	DF	(Italy) ITA	Tassotti	39	0	28	0	7	0	4	0
	DF	(Italy) ITA	Galli	40	0	30	0	7	0	3	0
	DF	(Italy) ITA	Baresi	36	1	27	1	6	0	3	0
	DF	(Italy) ITA	Maldini	29	2	26	2	1	0	2	0
	MF	(Italy) ITA	Donadoni	39	6	28+1	4	7	2	3	0
	MF	(Italy) ITA	Ancelotti	38	2	27	2	7	0	4	0
	MF	(Italy) ITA	Colombo	35	3	26	3	5	0	4	0
	MF	(Italy) ITA	Evani	30	2	22+5	2	2	0	1	0
	FW	(Netherlands) NED	Gullit	39	13	29	9	6	3	4	1
	FW	(Italy) ITA	Virdis	33	15	23+2	11	4	2	4	2
	GK	(Italy) ITA	Nuciari	2	-1	0	0	2	-1	0	-0
	FW	(Italy) ITA	Massaro	35	5	15+11	4	7	1	2	0
	MF	(Italy) ITA	Bortolazzi	22	1	6+7	1	7	0	2	0
	DF	(Italy) ITA	Mussi	18	0	6+5	0	4	0	3	0
	FW	(Netherlands) NED	van Basten	19	8	4+7	3	5	5	3	0
	DF	(Italy) ITA	Costacurta	8	0	2+5	0	1	0	0	0
	DF	(Switzerland) SUI	Bianchi	10	0	1+2	0	4	0	3	0
	DF	(Italy) ITA	Verga	3	0	0+3	0	0	0	0	0
	FW	(Italy) ITA	Cappellini	2	0	0+2	0	0	0	0	0
	FW	(Italy) ITA	Mannari	1	0	0+1	0	0	0	0	0

== Sources ==
- RSSSF – Italy 1987/88
