= 1989–90 AC Milan season =

Milan
1989–90 season
- Chairman: Silvio Berlusconi
- Manager: Arrigo Sacchi
- Serie A: 2nd
- Coppa Italia: Runners-up
- European Cup: Winners (in 1990–91 European Cup)
- European Super Cup: Winners
- Intercontinental Cup: Winners
- Top goalscorer: League: Marco van Basten (19); All: Marco van Basten (25)
- Average home league attendance: 59,054
Home colours	Away colours	Third colours

AC Milan won their second consecutive European Cup, after a final victory over Benfica. The Dutch trio of Marco van Basten, Ruud Gullit and Frank Rijkaard was now a firmly established unit, but they were unable to defeat Napoli in the title chase.

== Squad ==
Note: Flags indicate national team as defined under FIFA eligibility rules; some limited exceptions apply. Players may hold more than one non-FIFA nationality.

No.	Pos.	Nation	Player
—	GK	ITA	Francesco Antonioli
—	GK	ITA	Giovanni Galli
—	GK	ITA	Andrea Pazzagli
—	GK	ITA	Francesco Toldo
—	DF	ITA	Franco Baresi
—	DF	ITA	Stefano Carobbi
—	DF	ITA	Alessandro Costacurta
—	DF	ITA	Filippo Galli
—	DF	ITA	Paolo Maldini
—	DF	ITA	Marco Pullo
—	DF	ITA	Mauro Tassotti
—	DF	ITA	Rufo Emiliano Verga
—	DF	POR	Júlio Grilo
—	MF	ITA	Demetrio Albertini
—	MF	ITA	Carlo Ancelotti

No.	Pos.	Nation	Player
—	MF	ITA	Angelo Colombo
—	MF	ITA	Roberto Donadoni
—	MF	ITA	Alberigo Evani
—	MF	ITA	Diego Fuser
—	MF	ITA	Christian Lantignotti
—	MF	NED	Frank Rijkaard
—	MF	ITA	Stefano Salvatori
—	MF	ITA	Giovanni Stroppa
—	FW	NED	Ruud Gullit
—	FW	ITA	Stefano Borgonovo
—	FW	ITA	Daniele Massaro
—	FW	ITA	Marco Simone
—	FW	NED	Marco van Basten
—	FW	ITA	Giuseppe Galderisi

=== Transfers ===
In
Pos.	Name	from	Type
GK	Andrea Pazzagli	Ascoli Calcio 1898 FC	-
DF	Stefano Carobbi	Fiorentina	-
DF	Marco Pullo	Parma FC	loan ended
DF	Rufo Emiliano Verga	Parma FC	loan ended
MF	Stefano Salvatori	Fiorentina	
MF	Diego Fuser	Torino	
MF	Giovanni Stroppa	AC Monza	loan ended
FW	Stefano Borgonovo	Fiorentina	loan ended
FW	Giuseppe Galderisi	Hellas Verona	loan ended
FW	Daniele Massaro	A.S. Roma	loan ended
FW	Marco Simone	Como 1907	

Out
Pos.	Name	To	Type
GK	Davide Pinato	AC Monza	
DF	Walter Bianchi	Torino	
DF	Roberto Mussi	Torino	
DF	Matteo Villa	Trento	-
MF	Fabio Lago	Citadella	-
MF	Fabio Viviani	AC Monza	
FW	Massimiliano Cappellini	AC Monza	loan
FW	Graziano Mannari	Como 1907	
FW	Pietro Paolo Virdis	U.S. Lecce	

== Competitions ==
=== Serie A ===
==== League table ====
Pos	Team	Pld	W	D	L	GF	GA	GD	Pts	Qualification or relegation
1	Napoli (C)	34	21	9	4	57	31	+26	51	Qualification to European Cup
2	Milan (Note: Milan qualified for the 1990–91 European Cup as defending champions.)	34	22	5	7	56	27	+29	49	Qualification to European Cup
3	Internazionale	34	17	10	7	55	32	+23	44	Qualification to UEFA Cup
4	Juventus	34	15	14	5	56	36	+20	44	Qualification to Cup Winners' Cup
5	Sampdoria (Note: Sampdoria qualified for the 1990–91 European Cup Winners' Cup as defending champions.)	34	16	11	7	46	26	+20	43	Qualification to Cup Winners' Cup

Source: 1989–90 Serie A, RSSSF.com
Rules for classification: 1) Points; 2) Head-to-head points; 3) Head-to-head goal difference; 4) Goal difference; 5) Goals scored; 6) Draw.
(C) Champions

==== Results summary ====
Overall								Home						Away					
Pld	W	D	L	GF	GA	GD	Pts	W	D	L	GF	GA	GD	W	D	L	GF	GA	GD
34	22	5	7	56	27	+29	71	13	2	2	31	11	+20	9	3	5	25	16	+9

Source: Competitive matches

==== Results by round ====
Round	1	2	3	4	5	6	7	8	9	10	11	12	13	14	15	16	17	18	19	20	21	22	23	24	25	26	27	28	29	30	31	32	33	34	35	36
Ground	A	H	A	H	A	H	A	A	H	A	H	A	H	H	A	H	A	H	H	A	H	A	H	H	A	H	A	H	A	H	A	H	H	A	H	A
Result	W	L	W	W	D	D	L	L	W	L	W	W	W	W	D	-	W	-	W	W	W	W	W	W	D	W	W	W	W	L	L	W	D	W	L	W
Position	1	6	4	3	3	5	7	8	6	8	8	6	3	2	3	5	5	5	5	4	4	3	2	2	2	1	1	1	1	1	1	1	1	1	2	2

Source: Competitive matches
A = Away; H = Home; W = Win; D = Draw; L = Loss; = 1990–91 European Cup; = 1990–91 UEFA Cup

==== Matches ====
27 August 1989 1	Cesena	0–3	Milan	Cesena
		Report	Stroppa 7'; Borgonovo 10'; Massaro 44'	Stadium: Stadio Dino Manuzzi; Attendance: 29,059; Referee: Arcangelo Pezzella

3 September 1989 2	Milan	0–1	Lazio	Milan
		Report	Maldini 41' (o.g.)	Stadium: San Siro; Attendance: 52,737; Referee: Carlo Sguizzato

6 September 1989 3	Atalanta	0–1	Milan	Bergamo
		Report	Ancelotti 29'	Stadium: Stadio Comunale; Attendance: 29,188; Referee: Tullio Lanese

10 September 1989 4	Milan	3–1	Udinese	Milan
	Ancelotti 45'; Massaro 66'; Rijkaard 83'	Report	Balbo 48'	Stadium: San Siro; Attendance: 53,229; Referee: Bruno Di Cola

17 September 1989 5	Genoa	1–1	Milan	Genoa
	Aguilera 73'	Report	Rijkaard 77'	Stadium: Stadio Luigi Ferraris; Attendance: 25,015; Referee: Arcangelo Pezzella

24 September 1989 6	Milan	1–1	Fiorentina	Milan
	Tassotti 2'	Report	Dell'Oglio 66'	Stadium: San Siro; Attendance: 63,694; Referee: Luigi Agnolin

1 October 1989 7	Napoli	3–0	Milan	Naples
	Carnevale 19', 45'; Maradona 84'	Report		Stadium: Stadio San Paolo; Attendance: 62,282; Referee: Pierluigi Pairetto

8 October 1989 8	Cremonese	1–0	Milan	Cremona
	Dezotti 9'	Report		Stadium: Stadio Giovanni Zini; Attendance: 19,304; Referee: Carlo Longhi

22 October 1989 9	Milan	1–0	Roma	Milan
	van Basten 81'	Report		Stadium: San Siro; Attendance: 56,780; Referee: Pietro D'Elia

29 October 1989 10	Ascoli	1–0	Milan	Ascoli Piceno
	Casagrande 41'	Report		Stadium: Stadio Cino e Lillo Del Duca; Attendance: 18,808; Referee: Tullio Lanese

5 November 1989 11	Milan	3–2	Juventus	Milan
	van Basten 52' (pen.), 85'; Donadoni 78'	Report	De Agostini 62' (pen.); Schillaci 65'	Stadium: San Siro; Attendance: 68,333; Referee: Luigi Agnolin

19 November 1989 12	Inter Milan	0–3	Milan	Milan
		Report	van Basten 52'; Fuser 75'; Massaro 86'	Stadium: San Siro; Attendance: 66,309; Referee: Pierluigi Pairetto

26 November 1989 13	Milan	2–0	Lecce	Milan
	van Basten 59' (pen.); Massaro 78'	Report		Stadium: San Siro; Attendance: 58,109; Referee: Luciano Luci

3 December 1989 14	Milan	1–0	Bologna	Milan
	Donadoni 65'	Report		Stadium: San Siro; Attendance: 61,607; Referee: Angelo Amendolia

10 December 1989 15	Sampdoria	1–1	Milan	Genoa
	Vierchowod 65'	Report	Ancelotti 70'	Stadium: Stadio Luigi Ferraris; Attendance: 37,096; Referee: Pietro D'Elia

30 December 1989 17	Bari	0–1	Milan	Bari
		Report	van Basten 89'	Stadium: Stadio della Vittoria; Attendance: 31,031; Referee: Pierluigi Pairetto

7 January 1990 18	Milan	3–0	Cesena	Milan
	Donadoni 9'; Tassotti 49' van Basten 75' (pen.)	Report		Stadium: San Siro; Attendance: 53,174; Referee: Gianni Beschin

14 January 1990 19	Lazio	1–3	Milan	Rome
	Amarildo 66'	Report	Massaro 5'; Fuser 10'; Colombo 71'	Stadium: Stadio Flaminio; Attendance: 22,249; Referee: Pietro D'Elia

17 January 1990 20	Milan	3–1	Atalanta	Milan
	van Basten 14', 60', 62'	Report	Caniggia 12'	Stadium: San Siro; Attendance: 60,417; Referee: Tullio Lanese

21 January 1990 21	Udinese	0–2	Milan	Udine
		Report	van Basten 12', 80'	Stadium: Stadio Friuli; Attendance: 37,837; Referee: Luigi Agnolin

28 January 1990 22	Milan	1–0	Genoa	Milan
	Massaro 1'	Report		Stadium: San Siro; Attendance: 58,835; Referee: Sergio Coppetelli

4 February 1990 23	Fiorentina	2–3	Milan	Perugia
	R. Baggio 23' (pen.); Kubík 47'	Report	Evani 55' van Basten 60' (pen.), 66' (pen.)	Stadium: Stadio Renato Curi; Attendance: 20,690; Referee: Carlo Longhi

7 February 1990 16	Milan	0–0	Verona	Milan
		Report		Stadium: San Siro; Attendance: 62,158; Referee: Luciano Luci
Note: The match was scheduled for 17 December 1989, but moved because of Milan's involvement in the 1989 Intercontinental Cup. The first date originally chosen for the recovery was 3 January 1990 but the game was abandoned after 28 minutes due to heavy fog, while the score was still 0–0 and subsequently replayed.

11 February 1990 24	Milan	3–0	Napoli	Milan
	Massaro 47'; Maldini 71' van Basten 86'	Report		Stadium: San Siro; Attendance: 70,019; Referee: Luigi Agnolin

18 February 1990 25	Milan	2–1	Cremonese	Milan
	Massaro 17' van Basten 72'	Report	Dezotti 85' (pen.)	Stadium: San Siro; Attendance: 65,452; Referee: Carlo Sguizzato

25 February 1990 26	Roma	0–4	Milan	Rome
		Report	Tempestilli 34' (o.g.) van Basten 39', 57'; Massaro 89'	Stadium: Stadio Flaminio; Attendance: 27,124; Referee: Pierluigi Pairetto

4 March 1990 27	Milan	2–1	Ascoli	Milan
	Stroppa 52'; Tassotti 64'	Report	Cvetković 47'	Stadium: San Siro; Attendance: 61,014; Referee: Piero Ceccarini

11 March 1990 28	Juventus	3–0	Milan	Turin
	Schillaci 7'; Rui Barros 18', 58'	Report		Stadium: Stadio Comunale; Attendance: 48,113; Referee: Carlo Longhi

18 March 1990 29	Milan	1–3	Inter Milan	Milan
	Costacurta 84'	Report	Serena 4', 90'; Matthäus 24' (pen.)	Stadium: San Siro; Attendance: 62,447; Referee: Pierluigi Pairetto

25 March 1990 30	Lecce	1–2	Milan	Lecce
	Benedetti 6'	Report	Baresi 34' van Basten 58'	Stadium: Stadio Via del Mare; Attendance: 41,280; Referee: Rosario Lo Bello

8 April 1990 31	Bologna	0–0	Milan	Bologna
		Report		Stadium: Stadio Renato Dall'Ara; Attendance: 37,744; Referee: Tullio Lanese

13 April 1990 32	Milan	1–0	Sampdoria	Milan
	Massaro 61'	Report		Stadium: San Siro; Attendance: 58,136; Referee: Carlo Longhi

22 April 1990 33	Verona	2–1	Milan	Verona
	Sotomayor 63'; D. Pellegrini 89'	Report	Simone 33'	Stadium: Stadio Marc'Antonio Bentegodi; Attendance: 33,871; Referee: Rosario Lo Bello

29 April 1990 34	Milan	4–0	Bari	Bergamo
	Borgonovo 68'; Evani 71', 78'; Donadoni 76'	Report		Stadium: Stadio Comunale; Attendance: 41,570; Referee: Luciano Luci

=== Coppa Italia ===
==== First round ====
23 August 1989	Parma	0–0 (a.e.t.) (6–7 p)	Milan	Stadio Ennio Tardini, Parma
				Attendance: 18,000; Referee: Tullio Lanese
	Penalties
	Pizzi (penalty scored); Apolloni (penalty missed); Minotti (penalty scored); Ganz (penalty scored); Zoratto (penalty scored); Monza (penalty scored); Catanese (penalty missed); Susic (penalty scored); Gambaro (penalty missed)		(penalty missed) Baresi; (penalty scored) Van Basten; (penalty scored) Costacurta; (penalty scored) A. Colombo; (penalty scored) Salvatori; (penalty scored) Stroppa; (penalty missed) F. Galli; (penalty scored) Maldini; (penalty scored) Borgonovo

==== Second round ====
30 August 1989	Cremonese	0–1	Milan	Stadio Giovanni Zini, Cremona
20:30 CEST (UTC+02:00)			Massaro 84'	Attendance: 16,182; Referee: Pierluigi Pairetto

==== Group stage ====
Pos	Team	Pld	W	D	L	GF	GA	GD	Pts
1	Milan	2	1	1	0	7	1	+6	3
2	Atalanta	2	0	2	0	1	1	0	2
3	Messina	2	0	1	1	0	6	−6	1

10 January 1990 Round 1	Milan	6–0	Messina	San Siro, Milan
	Baresi 27' (pen.), 82' (pen.), 86' (pen.); Borgonovo 58', 70'; Simone 89'			Attendance: 5,232; Referee: Alfredo Trentalange

24 January 1990 Round 2	Atalanta	1–1	Milan	Stadio Comunale, Bergamo
	Bresciani 41'		Baresi 89' (pen.)	Attendance: 13,310; Referee: Arcangelo Pezzella

==== Semi-finals ====
31 January 1990 First Leg	Milan	0–0	Napoli	San Siro, Milan
14:30 CEST (UTC+01:00)				Attendance: 19,340; Referee: Fabio Baldas

14 February 1990 Second Leg	Napoli	1–3	Milan	Stadio San Paolo, Naples
14:30 CEST (UTC+01:00)	Maradona 79' (pen.)		Massaro 44' (pen.), 88'; Van Basten 77' (pen.)	Attendance: 49,376; Referee: Tullio Lanese

==== Final ====
28 February 1990 First Leg	Juventus	0–0	Milan	Stadio Comunale, Turin
20:30 CEST (UTC+01:00)			Ancelotti (yellow card) 15'; Galli (yellow card) 55'; Rijkaard (red card) 68'	Attendance: 30,105; Referee: Pietro D'Elia

25 April 1990 Second Leg	Milan	0–1	Juventus	San Siro, Milan
16:00 CEST (UTC+02:00)	Baresi (yellow card) 50'		Galia 17'; Marocchi (yellow card) 62'	Attendance: 83,928; Referee: Pietro D'Elia

=== European Cup ===
==== First round ====
13 September 1989 First Leg	Milan (Italy)	4–0	(Finland) HJK Helsinki	Milan, Italy
20:30 CEST (UTC+02:00)	Stroppa 5'; Massaro 39', 70'; Evani 80'	Report	Martonen (yellow card) 68'	Stadium: San Siro; Attendance: 41,205; Referee: Stephanos Hadjistefanou (Cyprus)

27 September 1989 Second Leg	HJK Helsinki (Finland)	0–1	(Italy) Milan	Helsinki, Finland
19:00 CEST (UTC+01:00)	Väyrynen (yellow card) 86'	Report	Borgonovo 30'; Carobbi (yellow card) 40'	Stadium: Helsinki Olympic Stadium; Attendance: 17,864; Referee: Valeri Butenko (Soviet Union)

==== Second round ====
18 October 1989 First Leg	Milan (Italy)	2–0	(Spain) Real Madrid	Milan, Italy
20:30 CEST (UTC+01:00)	Rijkaard 9' van Basten 14' (pen.), (yellow card) 75'; Evani (yellow card) 26'; Ancelotti (yellow card) 38'; Colombo (yellow card) 81'	Report	Hierro (yellow card) 11'; Míchel (yellow card) 36'; Llorente (yellow card) 85'	Stadium: San Siro; Attendance: 68,359; Referee: Aron Schmidhuber (West Germany)

1 November 1989 Second Leg	Real Madrid (Spain)	1–0	(Italy) Milan	Madrid, Spain
20:30 CEST (UTC+01:00)	Llorente (yellow card) 13'; Butragueño 45'; Hierro (yellow card) 69'; Sanchís (red card) 74'; Sánchez (yellow card) 82'	Report	Maldini (yellow card) 25'; Tassotti (yellow card) 44'; Fuser (yellow card) 84'; Massaro (yellow card) 88'	Stadium: Santiago Bernabéu Stadium; Attendance: 82,783; Referee: Michel Vautrot (France)

==== Quarter-finals ====
7 March 1990 First Leg	KV Mechelen (Belgium)	0–0	(Italy) Milan	Brussels, Belgium
20:15 CEST (UTC+01:00)		Report	Costacurta (yellow card) 3'	Stadium: Heysel Stadium; Attendance: 33,000; Referee: George Courtney (England)

21 March 1990 Second Leg	Milan (Italy)	2–0 (a.e.t.)	(Belgium) KV Mechelen	Milan, Italy
20:30 CEST (UTC+01:00)	Donadoni (red card) 102' van Basten 105'; Simone 116'; Baresi (yellow card) 118'	Report	Clijsters (red card) 89'; Deferm (yellow card) 100'; Versavel (yellow card) 101'	Stadium: San Siro; Attendance: 62, 801; Referee: Kurt Röthlisberger (Switzerland)

==== Semi-finals ====
4 April 1990 First Leg	Milan (Italy)	1–0	(Germany) Bayern Munich	Milan, Italy
20:30 CEST (UTC+02:00)	van Basten 77' (pen.)	Report	Pflügler (yellow card) 25'; Dorfner (yellow card) 65'	Stadium: San Siro; Attendance: 62,717; Referee: Bo Karlsson (Sweden)

18 April 1990 Second Leg	Bayern Munich (Germany)	2–1 (a.e.t.)	(Italy) Milan	Munich, Germany
20:30 CEST (UTC+02:00)	Strunz 59'; Grahammer (yellow card) 87'; McInally 106'	Report	Borgonovo 100'	Stadium: Olympic Stadium; Attendance: 72,000; Referee: Emilio Soriano (Spain)

==== Final ====
23 May 1990	Milan (Italy)	1–0	(Portugal) Benfica	Vienna, Austria
20:15 CEST (UTC+02:00)	Rijkaard 67'	Report	Aldair (yellow card) 40'; Ricardo (yellow card) 65'	Stadium: Praterstadion; Attendance: 58,000; Referee: Helmut Kohl (Austria)

=== Intercontinental Cup ===
17 December 1989	Milan (Italy)	1–0 (a.e.t.)	(Colombia) Atlético Nacional	Tokyo, Japan
12:00 CEST (UTC+09:00)	Evani 119'			Stadium: National Stadium; Attendance: 60,228; Referee: Erik Fredriksson (Sweden)

=== European Super Cup ===
23 November 1989 First Leg	Barcelona (Spain)	1–1	(Italy) Milan	Barcelona, Spain
21:00 CEST (UTC+01:00)	Amor 67', (yellow card) 71'; Koeman (yellow card) 68'		Van Basten 44' (pen.); Salvatori (yellow card) 48'; Costacurta (yellow card) 77'	Stadium: Camp Nou; Attendance: 55,000; Referee: Joël Quiniou (France)

7 December 1989 Second Leg	Milan (Italy)	1–0	(Spain) Barcelona	Milan, Italy
20:00 CEST (UTC+01:00)	Evani 55'; Tassotti (yellow card) 83'		Sacristàn (yellow card) 54'; Alexanko (yellow card) 85'	Stadium: San Siro; Attendance: 52,093; Referee: Helmut Kohl (Austria)

== Statistics ==
=== Player statistics ===
No.	Pos	Nat	Player	Total		Serie A		Coppa Italia		European Cup	
No.	Pos	Nat	Player	Apps	Goals	Apps	Goals	Apps	Goals	Apps	Goals
	GK	(Italy) ITA	Pazzagli	25	-15	23	-15	1	0	1	0
	DF	(Italy) ITA	Tassotti	38	3	29	3	2	0	7	0
	DF	(Italy) ITA	Costacurta	36	1	25+1	1	3	0	7	0
	DF	(Italy) ITA	Baresi	45	5	30	1	7	4	8	0
	DF	(Italy) ITA	Maldini	44	1	30	1	6	0	8	0
	MF	(Italy) ITA	Donadoni	30	4	23+1	4	3	0	3	0
	MF	(Italy) ITA	Ancelotti	34	3	22+2	3	4	0	6	0
	MF	(Netherlands) NED	Rijkaard	44	4	27+2	2	6	0	9	2
	MF	(Italy) ITA	Evani	46	4	25+7	3	5	0	9	1
	FW	(Italy) ITA	Massaro	45	15	27+3	10	8	3	7	2
	FW	(Netherlands) NED	Van Basten	37	23	26	19	4	1	7	3
	GK	(Italy) ITA	G. Galli	26	-18	11	-12	7	-3	8	-3
	MF	(Italy) ITA	Colombo	35	1	16+5	1	5	0	9	0
	MF	(Italy) ITA	Fuser	29	2	14+6	2	7	0	2	0
	DF	(Italy) ITA	Galli	28	0	13+1	0	8	0	6	0
	FW	(Italy) ITA	Simone	29	3	10+11	1	3	1	5	1
	MF	(Italy) ITA	Stroppa	29	3	8+9	2	7	0	5	1
	FW	(Italy) ITA	Borgonovo	23	6	7+6	2	5	2	5	2
	MF	(Italy) ITA	Salvatori	18	0	7+3	0	7	0	1	0
	FW	(Netherlands) NED	Gullit	3	0	1+1	0	0	0	1	0
	DF	(Italy) ITA	Carobbi	6	0	0+2	0	3	0	1	0
	MF	(Italy) ITA	Albertini	1	0	0+1	0	0	0	0	0
	MF	(Italy) ITA	Lantignotti	4	0	0+2	0	1	0	1	0

- Source: http://calcio-seriea.net/presenze/1989/987/
