= Pazzagli =

Pazzagli is an Italian surname. Notable people with the surname include:

- Andrea Pazzagli (1960–2011), Italian footballer
- Edoardo Pazzagli (born 1989), Italian footballer
