= 1989 European Super Cup =

Barcelona	Milan
(Spain)	(Italy)
1	2
- on aggregate

First leg
Barcelona	Milan
1	1
- Date: 23 November 1989
- Venue: Camp Nou, Barcelona
- Referee: Joël Quiniou (France)
- Attendance: 50,000

Second leg
Milan	Barcelona
1	0
- Date: 7 December 1989
- Venue: San Siro, Milan
- Referee: Helmut Kohl (Austria)
- Attendance: 52,093

The 1989 European Super Cup was the 14th European Super Cup, an annual football match contested by the winners of the previous season's European Cup and European Cup Winners' Cup competitions. The 1989 Super Cup was played on a home-and-away basis, and was contested by Milan, winners of the 1988–89 European Cup, and Barcelona, who had won the 1988–89 European Cup Winners' Cup. After a 1–1 draw in the first leg at the Camp Nou in Barcelona, Milan won 1–0 at home to secure a 2–1 aggregate win and their first Super Cup.

== Match details ==
=== First leg ===
23 November 1989
21:00

Barcelona (Spain)	1–1	(Italy) Milan
Amor 67'	Report	Van Basten 44' (pen.)

Camp Nou, Barcelona
Attendance: 50,000
Referee: Joël Quiniou (France)

Barcelona	Milan

GK	1	(Spain) Andoni Zubizarreta (c)
DF	2	(Brazil) Aloísio
DF	3	(Spain) Ricardo Serna
DF	4	(Netherlands) Ronald Koeman
DF	5	(Spain) Luis Milla
MF	6	(Spain) José Mari Bakero
FW	7	(Spain) Julio Salinas	(substituted off) 65'
MF	8	(Spain) Eusebio Sacristán
MF	9	(Denmark) Michael Laudrup
MF	10	(Spain) Guillermo Amor
FW	11	(Spain) Txiki Begiristain
Substitutes:
DF	12	(Spain) José Ramón Alexanko
GK	13	(Spain) Juan Carlos Unzué
DF	14	(Spain) Miquel Soler
FW	15	(Spain) Onésimo
MF	16	(Spain) Roberto	(substituted on) 65'
Manager:
(Netherlands) Johan Cruyff

GK	1	(Italy) Giovanni Galli
DF	2	(Italy) Mauro Tassotti
DF	3	(Italy) Paolo Maldini
DF	4	(Italy) Stefano Salvatori
MF	5	(Netherlands) Frank Rijkaard (c)
DF	6	(Italy) Filippo Galli
MF	7	(Italy) Diego Fuser
MF	8	(Italy) Roberto Donadoni	(substituted off) 84'
CF	9	(Netherlands) Marco van Basten
CF	10	(Italy) Daniele Massaro	(substituted off) 88'
MF	11	(Italy) Alberico Evani
Substitutes:
GK	12	(Italy) Andrea Pazzagli
MF	14	(Italy) Giovanni Stroppa	(substituted on) 84'
MF	15	(Italy) Demetrio Albertini
FW	16	(Italy) Marco Simone	(substituted on) 88'
MF	17	(Italy) Christian Lantignotti
Manager:
(Italy) Arrigo Sacchi

=== Second leg ===
7 December 1989
20:00

Milan (Italy)	1–0	(Spain) Barcelona
Evani 55'	Report

San Siro, Milan
Attendance: 52,093
Referee: Helmut Kohl (Austria)

Milan	Barcelona

GK	1	(Italy) Giovanni Galli
DF	2	(Italy) Mauro Tassotti
DF	3	(Italy) Paolo Maldini
DF	4	(Italy) Alessandro Costacurta
MF	5	(Netherlands) Frank Rijkaard (c)
DF	6	(Italy) Stefano Carobbi
MF	7	(Italy) Diego Fuser
MF	11	(Italy) Alberico Evani
MF	8	(Italy) Roberto Donadoni
FW	10	(Italy) Daniele Massaro	(substituted off) 65'
FW	9	(Netherlands) Marco van Basten
Substitutes:
GK	12	(Italy) Andrea Pazzagli
MF	13	(Italy) Stefano Salvatori
MF	14	(Italy) Angelo Colombo
MF	15	(Italy) Giovanni Stroppa
FW	16	(Italy) Marco Simone	(substituted on) 65'
Manager:
(Italy) Arrigo Sacchi

GK	1	(Spain) Andoni Zubizarreta
DF	2	(Spain) Luis López Rekarte	(substituted off) 74'
DF	3	(Spain) José Ramón Alexanko (c)
DF	4	(Spain) Luis Milla
DF	5	(Spain) Ricardo Serna
MF	6	(Spain) José Mari Bakero
MF	7	(Spain) Jordi Roura	(substituted off) 10'
FW	8	(Spain) Eusebio Sacristán
FW	9	(Spain) Julio Salinas
MF	10	(Spain) Roberto
FW	11	(Spain) Txiki Begiristain
Substitutes:
GK	12	(Spain) Juan Carlos Unzué
DF	13	(Spain) Miquel Soler	(substituted on) 10'
DF	14	(Spain) Urbano Ortega
MF	15	(Spain) Julio Alberto
FW	16	(Spain) Onésimo	(substituted on) 74'
Manager:
(Netherlands) Johan Cruyff

== See also ==
- 1989–90 European Cup
- 1989–90 European Cup Winners' Cup
- 1989–90 AC Milan season
- 1989–90 FC Barcelona season
- 1994 UEFA Champions League Final – contested between same teams
- AC Milan in international football
- FC Barcelona in international football
