= Marco van Basten =

Dutch football player and manager (born 1964)

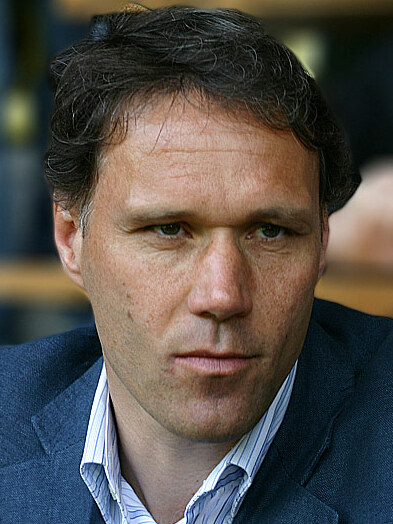
- Van Basten in 2006

Personal information
- Full name: Marcel van Basten
- Date of birth: 31 October 1964 (age 62)
- Place of birth: Utrecht, Netherlands
- Height: 1.88 m (6 ft 2 in)
- Position: Striker

Youth career
- 1970–1971: EDO
- 1971–1980: UVV
- 1980–1981: Elinkwijk

Senior career*
Years	Team	Apps	(Gls)
1981–1987	Ajax	133	(128)
1987–1995	AC Milan	147	(90)
Total		280	(218)

International career
1981–1983	Netherlands U21	15	(13)
1983–1992	Netherlands	58	(24)

Managerial career
- 2003–2004: Jong Ajax (assistant)
- 2004–2008: Netherlands
- 2008–2009: Ajax
- 2012–2014: Heerenveen
- 2014: AZ
- 2014–2015: AZ (assistant)
- 2015–2016: Netherlands (assistant)
Medal record
Men's football
Representing Netherlands
UEFA European Championship
Winner	1988
Third place	1992
- * Club domestic league appearances and goals

Marcel "Marco" van Basten (Dutch pronunciation: [ˈmɑrkoː vɑm ˈbɑstə(n)]; born 31 October 1964) is a Dutch former football manager and player who played as a striker for Ajax and AC Milan, as well as the Netherlands national football team. Regarded as one of the greatest players of all time, he scored over 300 goals at the highest club and international levels, but played his last game at the age of 28, followed by an early retirement at just 30, due to a recurring ankle injury and more than two years of unsuccessful treatment. He was later the head coach of Ajax and the Netherlands national team.

Known for his close ball control, attacking intelligence, impeccable headers, and spectacular strikes and volleys, Van Basten was named FIFA World Player of the Year in 1992 and won the Ballon d'Or three times, in 1988, 1989 and 1992. At club level, he won three Eredivisie titles and the Cup Winners' Cup with Ajax, and four Serie A titles and three European Cups with Milan. With the Netherlands, Van Basten won UEFA Euro 1988 where he earned the Golden Boot, scoring five goals, including a memorable volley in the final against the Soviet Union, considered one of the best ever.

In 1998, Van Basten was ranked sixth in the FIFA Player of the Century internet poll, tenth in the European player of the Century election held by the IFFHS and 12th in the IFFHS' World Player of the Century election. He was also voted eighth in a poll organised by the French magazine France Football, consulting their former Ballon d'Or winners to elect the Football Player of the Century. In 2004, he was named by Pelé in the FIFA 100 list of the world's greatest living players. In 2004, a poll for the 100 greatest Dutch people was held in the Netherlands: Van Basten ranked number 25, the second highest for a football player, behind Johan Cruyff. In 2007, Sky Sports ranked Van Basten first on its list of great athletes who had their careers cut short.

== Playing career ==
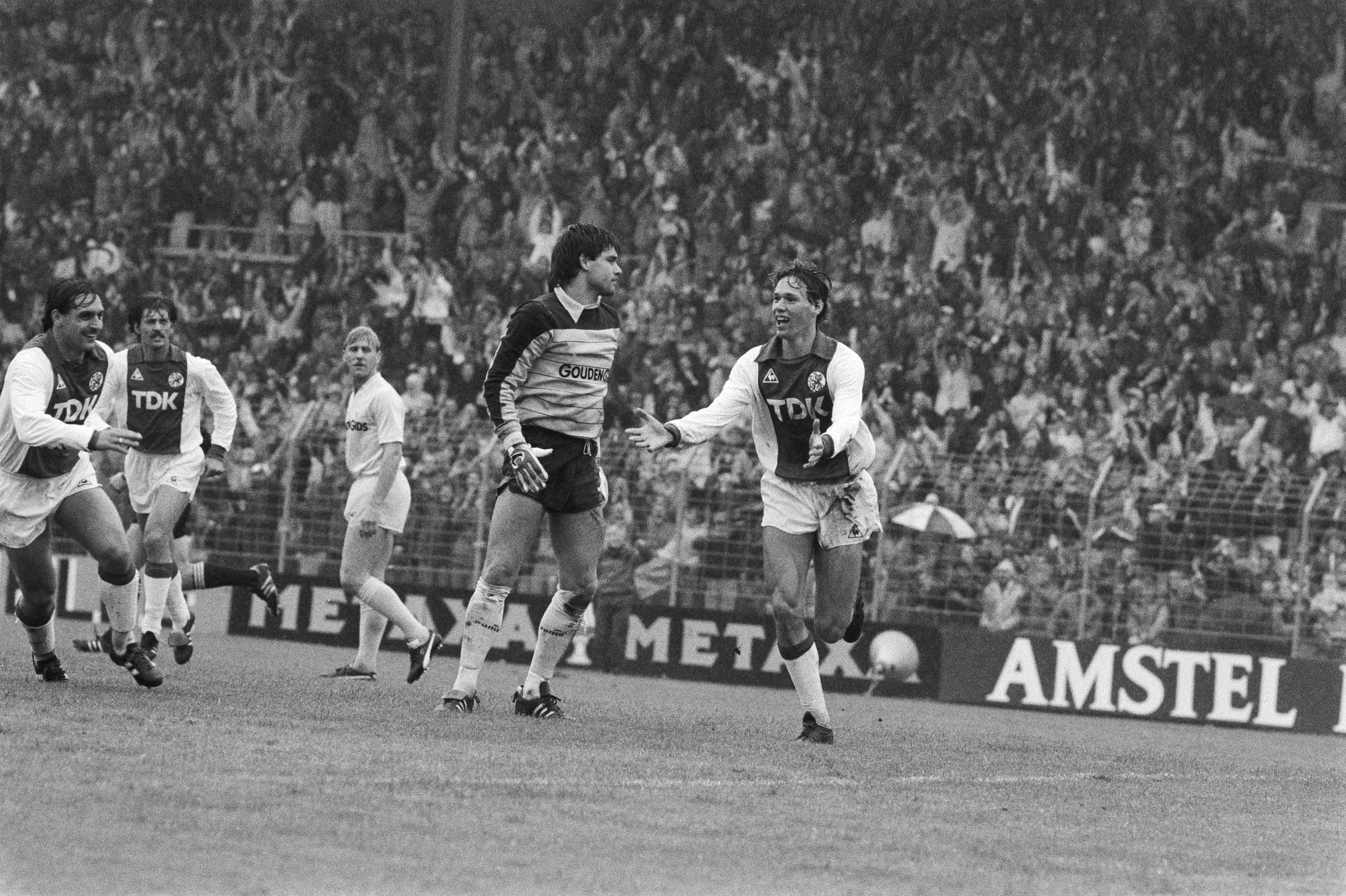
Van Basten celebrates his goal for Ajax to give the team a 2–0 lead in an eventual 8–2 win against Feyenoord in September 1983, following Gerald Vanenburg's corner. Edo Ophof (Ajax), Felix Gasselich (Ajax), André Hoekstra (Feyenoord) and goalkeeper Joop Hiele (Feyenoord) are the other players in the picture. The average age of the Ajax team at the time was roughly 22 1/2 years.

=== Early years ===
Marco van Basten was born on 31 October 1964 in Utrecht and grew up in the Oog In Al neighborhood. He began playing for a local team, EDO, when he was six years old. A year later, he moved to UVV Utrecht. After nine years there, he briefly played for another club from Utrecht, Elinkwijk.

=== Ajax ===
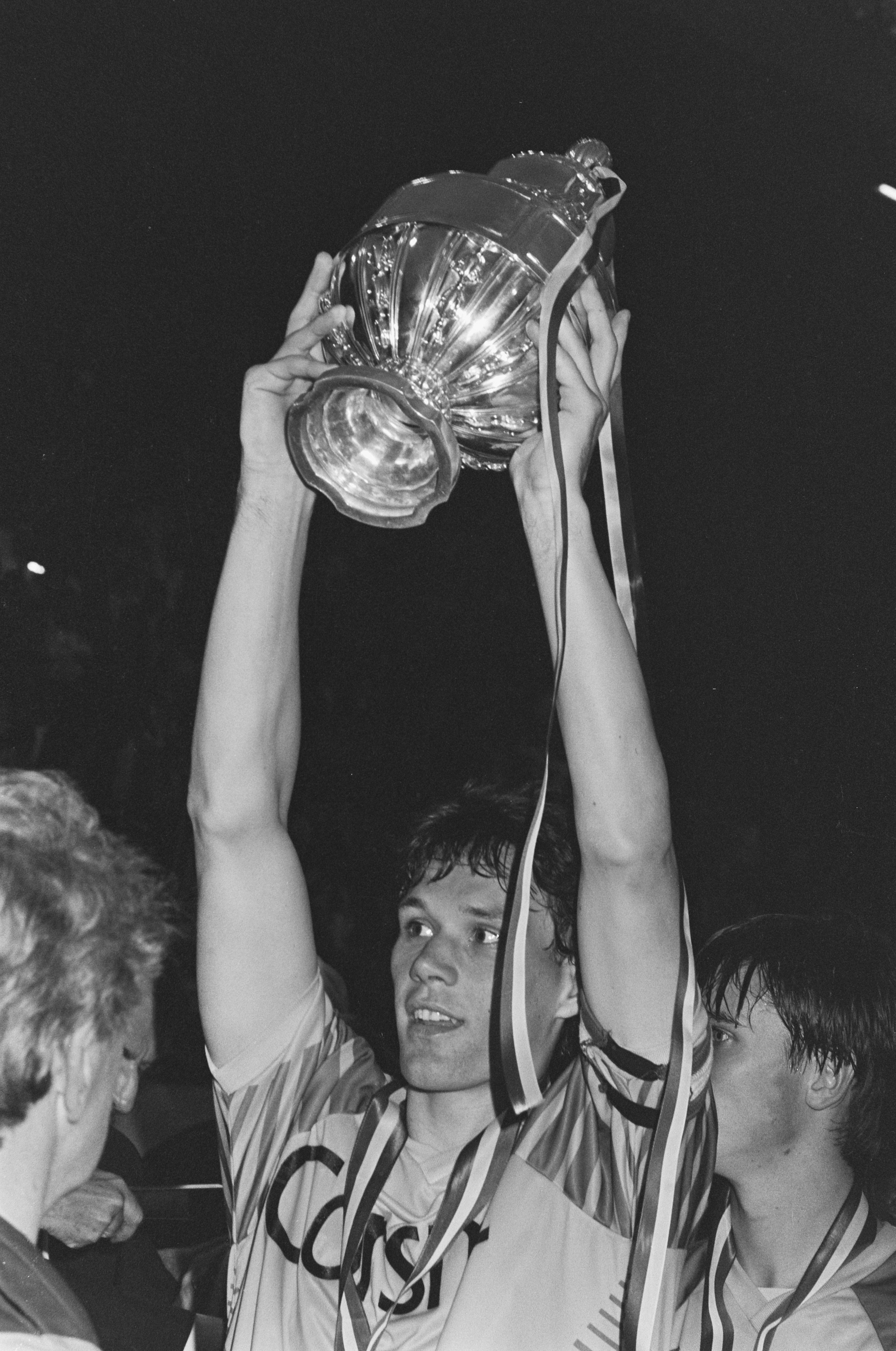
Van Basten lifting the 1987 KNVB Cup for Ajax

Ajax signed 16-year-old Marco for the 1981–82 season. He played his first match for Ajax on 3 April 1982, coming on as a substitute for Johan Cruyff, and scoring a debut goal in the team's 5–0 victory over NEC.

In the 1982–83 season, he competed with the European top scorer and first choice Holland international Wim Kieft for the position of centre forward, and scored nine goals in 20 league matches. Ajax chose to sell Kieft to Italian Serie A club Pisa the following season, and 18-year-old Van Basten solidified his position as his team's main attacker similarly in the national team.

He was the top scorer in the league for four consecutive seasons, from 1983–84 to 1986–87, scoring 118 goals in 112 matches. In the 1985–86 season, he scored 37 goals in 26 league matches, including six goals against Sparta Rotterdam and five against Heracles Almelo, and won the European Golden Boot. He also scored the winning goal in the UEFA Cup Winners' Cup final against Lokomotive Leipzig in 1987. In total he scored 128 goals in 133 league matches for Ajax. In November 1986 he scored his most famous goal in an Ajax jersey, a spectacular overhead kick against FC Den Bosch.

=== AC Milan ===
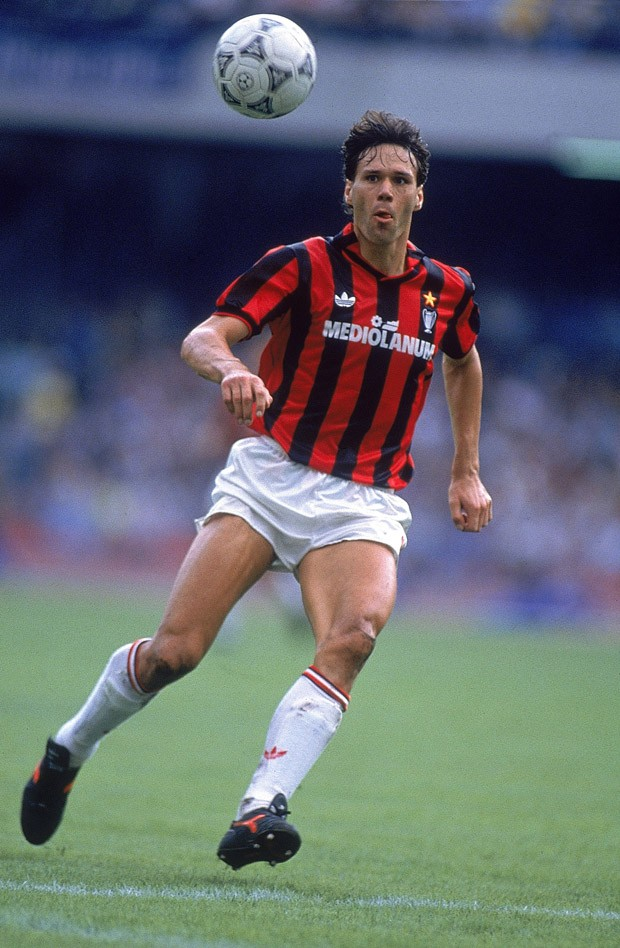
Van Basten at AC Milan

In 1987, Milan president Silvio Berlusconi signed Van Basten, along with fellow countryman Ruud Gullit. In 1988, the Dutch legion got completed when Frank Rijkaard joined the club (at the time only three non-Italians were allowed). In his first season, Milan won their first Scudetto in eight years, but Van Basten played only 11 matches and was constantly troubled by an ankle injury. In 1988–89, Van Basten won the Ballon d'Or as Europe's top footballer. He scored 19 goals in Serie A and 32 goals in all competitions that year, including two goals in the final of the European Cup, as Milan triumphed against Steaua București. In 1989–90, he became Capocannoniere again (Serie A's leading goal scorer); Milan also successfully defended the European Cup after beating Benfica 1–0 in the final match, during which Van Basten provided the assist for Rijkaard's match-winning goal.

Milan struggled in the 1990–91 season, as Sampdoria won the Scudetto. After Van Basten fell out with Arrigo Sacchi, Berlusconi sacked the manager. Fabio Capello took over the following season, and Milan went undefeated in the league to win another Scudetto. Van Basten scored 25 league goals, and became Capocannoniere again; his tally from the 1991–92 season was the highest number of goals that a player had scored in a single Serie A season since Luís Vinício achieved the same tally during the 1965–66 season.

"Marco was the greatest striker I ever coached. His early retirement was a mortal misfortune for him, for football, and for Milan."

— Former Milan manager Fabio Capello in 2010 on working with Van Basten and his premature retirement.

In November 1992, he became the first player to score four goals in a Champions League match, against IFK Göteborg, including a picture perfect bicycle kick. In December 1992, Van Basten was named FIFA World Player of the Year. Milan stretched their unbeaten run into the 1992–93 season, going 58 matches over two seasons before they lost a match. Van Basten was exceptional in the early part of the season. He was again voted the European player of the year, becoming the third player after Johan Cruyff and Michel Platini to win the award three times.

His troublesome ankle injury recurred in a game against Ancona, forcing him to endure another six-month layoff, and undergo a series of surgeries. He returned for the last few matches in the season, before Milan lost 1–0 to Marseille in the Champions League final. The match was Van Basten's final match for the Italian club. He came off in the 86th minute for Stefano Eranio, after a hard tackle behind from Basile Boli condemned Van Basten to the third ankle surgery of his career.

Van Basten had been hopeful of playing for his country at the 1994 World Cup as well as for his club in the 1994–95 season after spending the whole 1993–94 season out of action (missing Milan's victory in the European Cup as well as their Serie A title glory), but his club ordered him not to take part in the World Cup amid fear of ruining his rehabilitation. He finally conceded defeat in his battle to recover on 17 August 1995, when he announced his retirement as a player after two whole years on the sidelines. Van Basten made a farewell appearance to thank the Milan fans before a home game at the San Siro, with an emotional Milan coach Fabio Capello breaking down in tears.

== International career ==
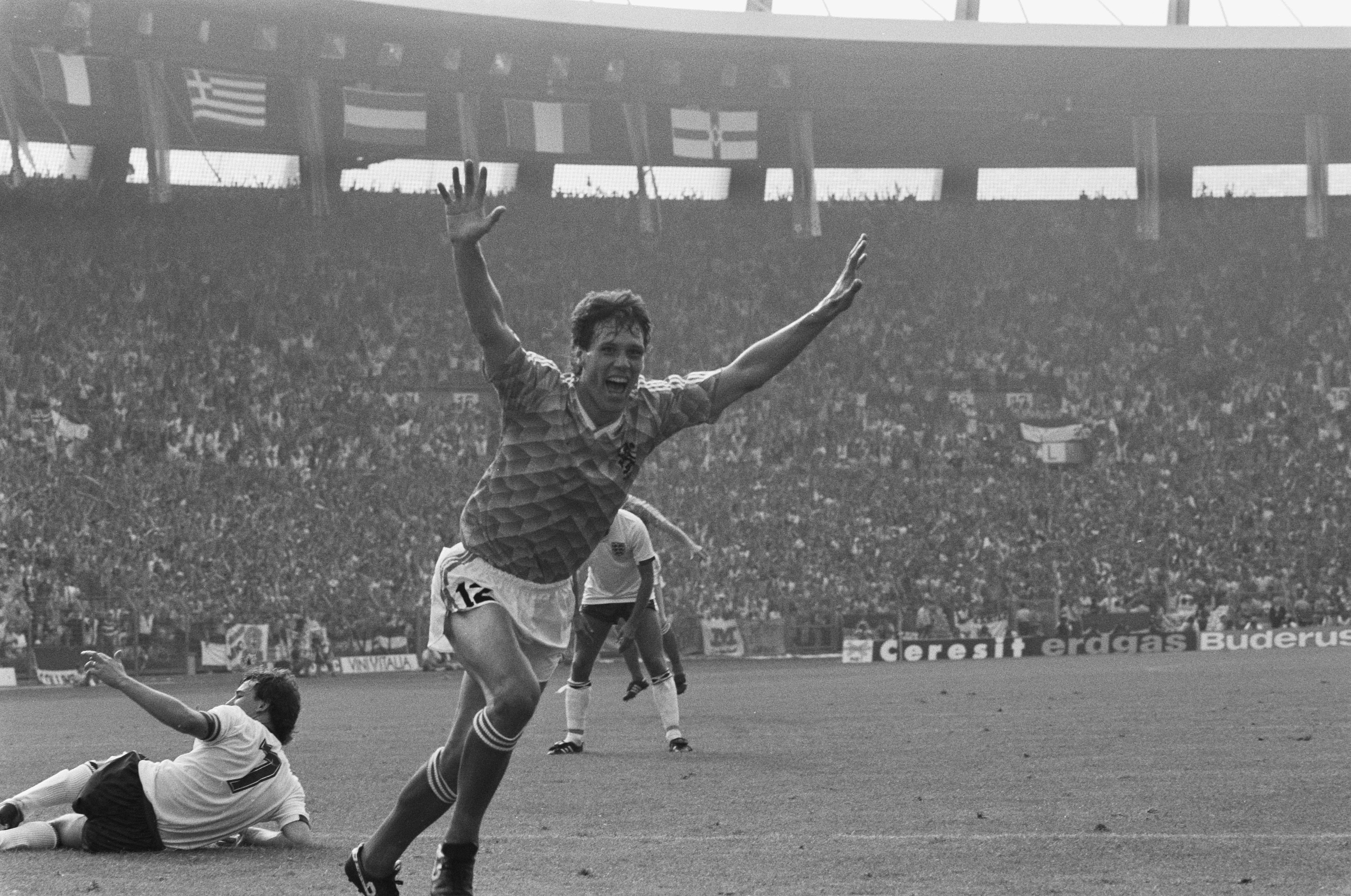
Van Basten celebrates his hat-trick against England at Euro 1988

On 7 September 1983, Van Basten debuted for the Netherlands national football team during a UEFA Euro 1984 qualifying against Iceland.

At UEFA Euro 1988, Van Basten played a pivotal role in the Dutch team's victorious campaign. He scored a total of five goals, including a hat-trick against England in the first round, the winning goal in the semi-final against West Germany, and a spectacular volley from an acute angle in the 2–0 final against the Soviet Union, during which he also provided the assist for Gullit's opening goal. He finished the competition as the top scorer and was named player of the tournament. He was also included in the team of the tournament. In a 2002 UK poll, Van Basten's volley against the Soviet Union was ranked #21 in the list of the 100 Greatest Sporting Moments.

The Dutch national team exited the 1990 World Cup early, losing 2–1 to eventual champions West Germany in the second round. Van Basten never scored in the World Cup finals. At UEFA Euro 1992, the Netherlands defeated reigning World Champions Germany 3–1 in the first round to top their group and reach the semi-finals, where they surprisingly lost to the eventual champions Denmark in a penalty shoot-out, with Peter Schmeichel saving a penalty shot from Van Basten. Although he went scoreless throughout the tournament, he was included in team of the tournament for the second time in 1992.

== Player profile ==
=== Style of play ===
Although he was mainly known as a traditional attacker who operated in the penalty area as a centre-forward throughout his career, Van Basten also possessed excellent vision and distribution, in addition to his goalscoring ability, which enabled him to play in deeper, more creative positions, as a second striker, for example, and which allowed him to participate in the build-up of attacking plays and provide assists to his teammates in addition to scoring goals himself; One of his most notable assists was the one he provided to Frank Rijkaard for Milan's winning goal in the 1990 European Cup final against Benfica. Despite his large stature, Van Basten possessed excellent technical skills and ball control, as well as good balance and a notable elegance on the ball, which inspired his nickname. As such, his strong physique, combined with his close control, also enabled him to hold up the ball for teammates when playing with his back to goal.

Despite his ability, Van Basten's career was severely affected by many grave injuries, which eventually forced him to retire from football prematurely at the age of 28. Lack of protection from referees and inadequate football rules against rugged defending and tackles from behind were identified as the source of the injuries which ultimately led to his career's demise; consequently, Van Basten's early retirement due to his injuries led to widespread debate in the football world over whether rash challenges from behind should be rendered illegal in football, in order to protect talented players more effectively. During the 1994 World Cup, an automatic red was also shown for tackles from behind or with studs showing. In 1998, prior to the World Cup that year, FIFA completely outlawed the tackle from behind; this ruling came to be known colloquially as the "Van Basten law" in the media. Although Van Basten was known for often being on the receiving end of hard challenges from his opponents throughout his career, former referee Daniele Tombolini described Van Basten as a player who was known for his physical play himself, and who utilised his strength and committed a lot of fouls during matches.

=== Reception and legacy ===
Considered by pundits to be one of the greatest and most complete players of all time, in 1998, Van Basten was ranked sixth in the FIFA Player of the Century internet poll, tenth in the European player of the Century election held by the IFFHS, and 12th in the IFFHS World Player of the Century election. He was also ranked eighth in a poll to determine France Football's "Football Player of the Century." In 1999, Van Basten was named the ninth greatest player of the twentieth century by World Soccer magazine. In 2004, he was named by Pelé in the FIFA 100, his list of the world's 125 greatest living players, and also placed fourth in the UEFA Golden Jubilee Poll, celebrating the best European footballers of the past fifty years. He was also ranked 25th in a poll for the 100 greatest Dutch people. In 2007, Sky Sports ranked Van Basten first on its list of great athletes who had their careers cut short. In 2016, Van Basten was included in UEFA's All-time Euro XI, while in 2017, he was named the 13th greatest player of all time by FourFourTwo.

"It is between Romário and Van Basten."

— Diego Maradona on who was the best player he ever saw.

Numerous players, managers, and other footballing figures have also lauded Van Basten as one of the greatest players of all time. In 1994, defender Pietro Vierchowod described Van Basten as "the absolute number one" and as a "superstar," also adding that "he is strong with his head, good with either foot, capable of changing the face of a game with a single play or, [even] when he is not at his best, of becoming the best assist-provider for his teammates." Former defender Jürgen Kohler, who often faced Van Basten throughout his career, described him as "a player with exceptional abilities. He was a big personality not only as a sportsman, but also as a private person. I benefited from him. It is as simple as this. He was a big milestone in my career and for me he is one of the players who are the most outstanding personalities of the last century. Not only in sports, also as a human being." When asked of their duels, he commented: "the duels between us were simply tough with everything football offers. He stood and I delivered and then I stood and he delivered."

Former Arsenal player Tony Adams described Van Basten as the toughest and most difficult opponent he had ever faced in 2006, stating: "He's the quickest 6 ft 3 in centre-forward I've ever seen! Just awesome. He was as quick as Ian Wright, as good in the air as Joe Jordan and he held the ball up better than Alan Smith. I put him in front of Maradona. Technically, Maradona was brilliant and he had amazing feet, but [V]an Basten could head, volley – he had power and strength." Fellow former defender Giuseppe Bergomi also described Van Basten as the strongest player he ever faced in 2018, commenting: "The best player of all time for me [...] is Maradona, but the strongest player I ever faced was [V]an Basten because at least I could beat Maradona to the ball with my head."

In 2017, two of Van Basten's former Milan teammates, Demetrio Albertini and Marco Simone, labelled the Dutchman as the best player they had ever played with, with the former stating, "The best player I have ever played with is Van Basten, the best overall. He had elegance and strength. He stopped playing at only 28 years of age, which is truly young." That same year, another one of his fellow former Milan teammates, Paolo Maldini, labelled Van Basten as the most complete player with whom he had ever played. Another former Milan teammate of Van Basten, Giovanni Cornacchini, described the Dutch striker as the greatest player of all time in 2019. Former Milan Vice-Chairman and CEO Adriano Galliani instead described Van Basten as Milan's greatest player ever in 2018. In 2017, Roberto Baggio named Van Basten as the player with whom he would have most liked to have played, commenting: "I'd have liked to play with him. He's the player that I exchanged shirts with most willingly."

In 2019, former Milan coach Fabio Capello described Van Basten and Ronaldo as the best players he ever coached. His predecessor at Milan, Arrigo Sacchi, described Van Basten as the best striker of all time in 2014, commenting: "Marco van Basten remains for me the best striker of all time. No other forward has worked as hard for the team as Marco did at Milan. I above all remember him for his elegance, his grace and his incredible quality." When Hernán Crespo was asked in 2015 who was the greatest centre-forward of all time, he echoed Sacchi's views, responding: "Marco van Basten. He did everything: dribbling, shooting, headers, acrobatics. And he played with his team and for his team." In 2019, Antonio Cassano described Van Basten and Ronaldo as the best forwards in the history of the game.

== Managerial career ==
=== Joining Ajax ===
Van Basten officially left Milan in 1995 and retired from football, stating he would never try management. However, he changed his mind and took a course with the Royal Dutch Football Association (KNVB). His first stint as a manager was as an assistant to his former teammate John van 't Schip with the second team of Ajax in 2003–04.

=== Netherlands ===
On 29 July 2004, Van Basten was named the new manager of the Netherlands national team, with Van 't Schip as his assistant. Van Basten's appointment as manager of the Netherlands sparked a little controversy at the time, since he only just started his managerial career and the media argued that he did not have a lot of experience yet.

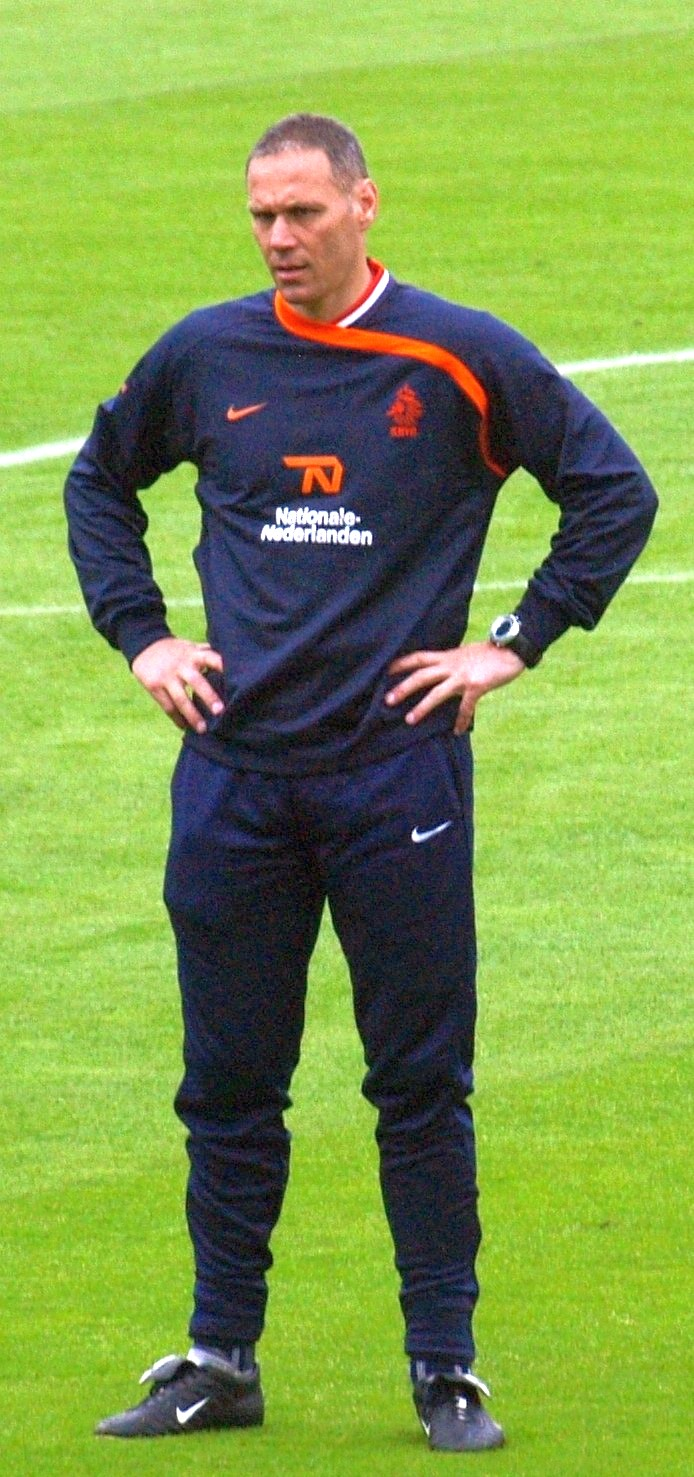
Van Basten while manager of the Netherlands.

After UEFA Euro 2004, veterans Frank de Boer and Jaap Stam retired from international football, while Michael Reiziger retired after being left out of Van Basten's first squad. Van Basten also omitted Ruud van Nistelrooy from that squad, as the striker was suspended for the first two games of 2006 FIFA World Cup qualification and Van Basten only wanted to use players eligible for those games. His debut on 18 August was a 2–2 draw away to Sweden. Van Basten dropped more experienced players such as Roy Makaay, Clarence Seedorf, Patrick Kluivert and Edgar Davids, while sending several inexperienced AZ players to the World Cup, including Joris Mathijsen, Denny Landzaat and Kew Jaliens. Several veterans, including Edwin van der Sar, Phillip Cocu and Mark van Bommel, did make the squad. His team went unbeaten in their first 16 games until losing a friendly 3–1 at home to Italy on 12 November 2005.

The Netherlands were widely tipped to do well at the 2006 World Cup, having achieved the highest points average of any team in qualification, as well as breaking their reputation for in-fighting, and having a short journey to the finals in Germany. The team were in Group C, considered the Group of death by international media for also containing Argentina, Ivory Coast and Serbia & Montenegro, the last of whom conceded only one goal in qualification. The Netherlands were eliminated in a 1–0 loss to Portugal in the Round of 16, with both teams receiving two red cards each.

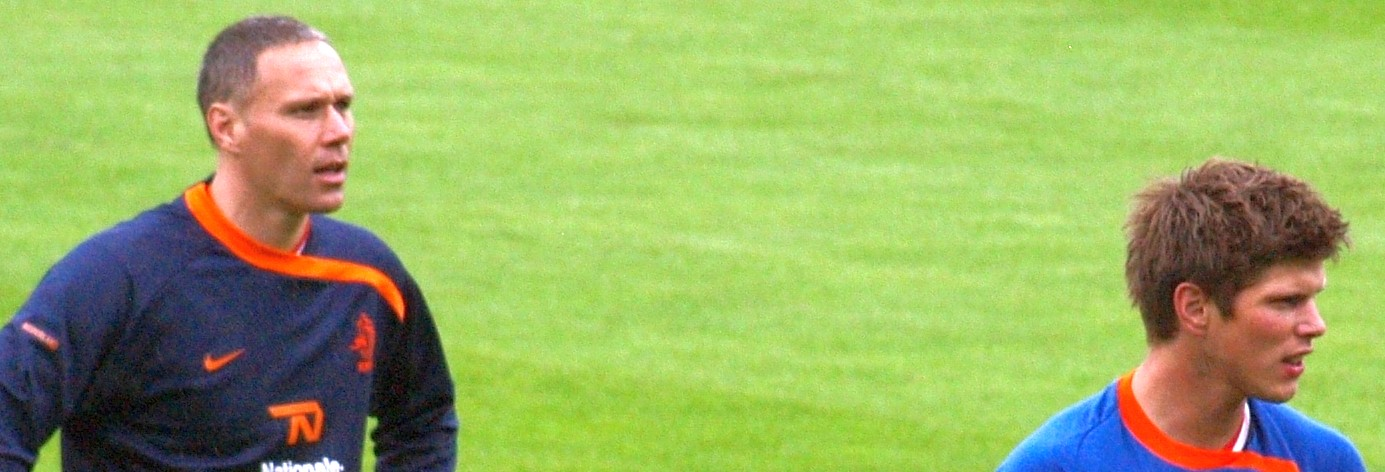
Van Basten (left) with Klaas-Jan Huntelaar during training prior to Euro 2008.

In November 2006, Van Basten recalled Seedorf for a friendly against England at the Amsterdam Arena. He denied allegations that he had caved in to media pressure to name Seedorf in place of the injured Wesley Sneijder. In May 2007, Van Basten announced the end of his long-running dispute with Van Nistelrooy, who had previously declared never to play for a Dutch national squad with Van Basten as its manager.

Van Basten had a contract with the KNVB for managing the Dutch national side until 2008. The KNVB had expressed its wishes to extend his contract to include the World Cup qualification route to 2010 World Cup in South Africa. On 22 February 2008, Van Basten signed a four-year contract with Ajax, starting from 1 July. His UEFA Euro 2008 selection was marred by Seedorf refusing to join the 30-man provisional squad unless Van Basten resigned, with Van Bommel having already made the same ultimatum.

At the tournament in Austria and Switzerland, the Netherlands beat world champions Italy 3–0 in their first match, followed by a 4–1 win over World Cup runners-up France. In their third match, having already qualified for the next round, Van Basten selected non-regulars such as Maarten Stekelenburg, Wilfred Bouma and Ibrahim Afellay for the starting lineup against Romania, a match the Oranje won 2–0. In the quarter-finals, Van Basten faced fellow Dutchman Guus Hiddink's Russia. With the score at 1–1 after 90 minutes, Hiddink and Russia went on to win the match 3–1 in extra-time. He finished his reign with a record of 35 wins, 11 draws and six losses in 52 matches.

=== Return to Ajax ===
Van Basten became manager of Ajax after Euro 2008 but resigned on 6 May 2009 after his team failed to qualify for the Champions League. Van Basten started the season well, having spent millions on players such as Miralem Sulejmani, Ismaïl Aissati, Darío Cvitanich, Evander Sno, Eyong Enoh and Oleguer. However, in the second half of the season, striker Klaas-Jan Huntelaar left for Real Madrid, and Van Basten started switching around his lineups. When Ajax lost 11 points in four matches, the Eredivisie title was out of sight. However, Ajax still had the chance to finish in second place, which would have ensured a place in the third qualifying round of the Champions League. Two important losses against PSV (6–2) and Sparta Rotterdam (4–0), however, ensured that Van Basten's Ajax could only finish third in the league. Van Basten decided to resign as Ajax manager at the end of the 2008–09 season. Van Basten subsequently became a pundit for Sport1, but was still planning to return as a manager. He finished his reign with a record of 26 wins, 8 draws and 11 losses in 45 matches.

=== Heerenveen ===
On 13 February 2012, it was announced that Van Basten would become the manager of Eredivisie club Heerenveen in the 2012–13 season. Van Basten led Heerenveen to an eighth-place finish in the 2012–13 year campaign. He then led them to a fifth-place finish the following season, during the 2013–14 campaign. He finished his reign with a record of 27 wins, 18 draws and 27 losses in 72 matches.

=== AZ ===
AZ Alkmaar announced on 18 April 2014 that Van Basten would replace Dick Advocaat at the start of the 2014–15 season. On 28 August 2014, Van Basten took a leave of absence for the following match against Dordrecht, with multiple Dutch news outlets reporting he was suffering from stress-related heart palpitations, and was replaced by assistant coaches Alex Pastoor and Dennis Haar. Later, on 3 September, AZ confirmed that Van Basten was given an extended leave of absence until 14 September. On 16 September 2014, parties agreed Van Basten would relinquish his role as manager in order to sign a new contract as assistant coach until 2016; this was motivated by Van Basten himself, who stated the stress caused by his full-time role as head coach was causing him physical and mental issues. He finished his stint with two wins and three losses in five matches.

=== FIFA technical director ===
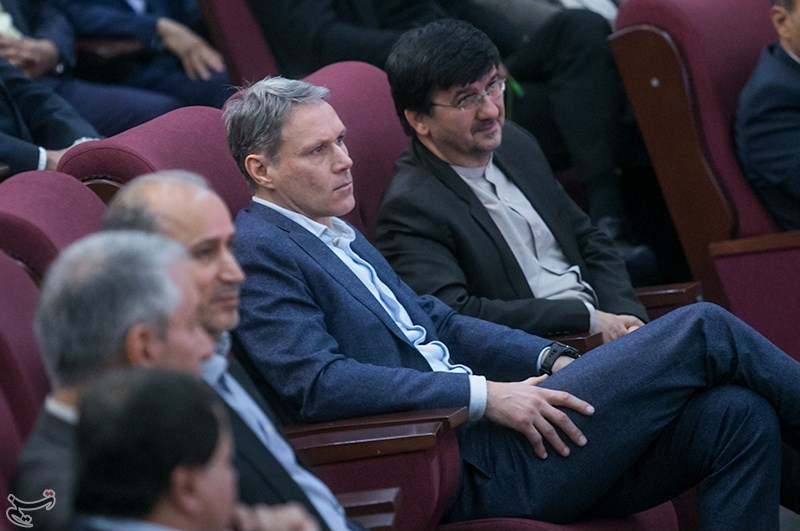
Van Basten (middle) in Tehran, 2018

After a year at AZ, Van Basten decided to take up the vacant post of assistant coach under the new head coach of the Netherlands national team, Danny Blind. Van Basten would work together with fellow assistant coach Ruud van Nistelrooy, whom Van Basten had initially sent away when he was head coach of the Netherlands. In August 2016, Van Basten announced he would be leaving the role to take up a position at FIFA as technical director.

In March 2018, Van Basten travelled to Iran with FIFA president Gianni Infantino to mark 100 years of the Iran Football Federation. After meeting Iranian President Hassan Rouhani they were welcomed by the president of Iranian Football Federation Mehdi Taj at the Tehran Olympic Hotel. Attending the Tehran Derby, Van Basten called for the ban on women entering sports venues to be lifted.

== After retirement ==
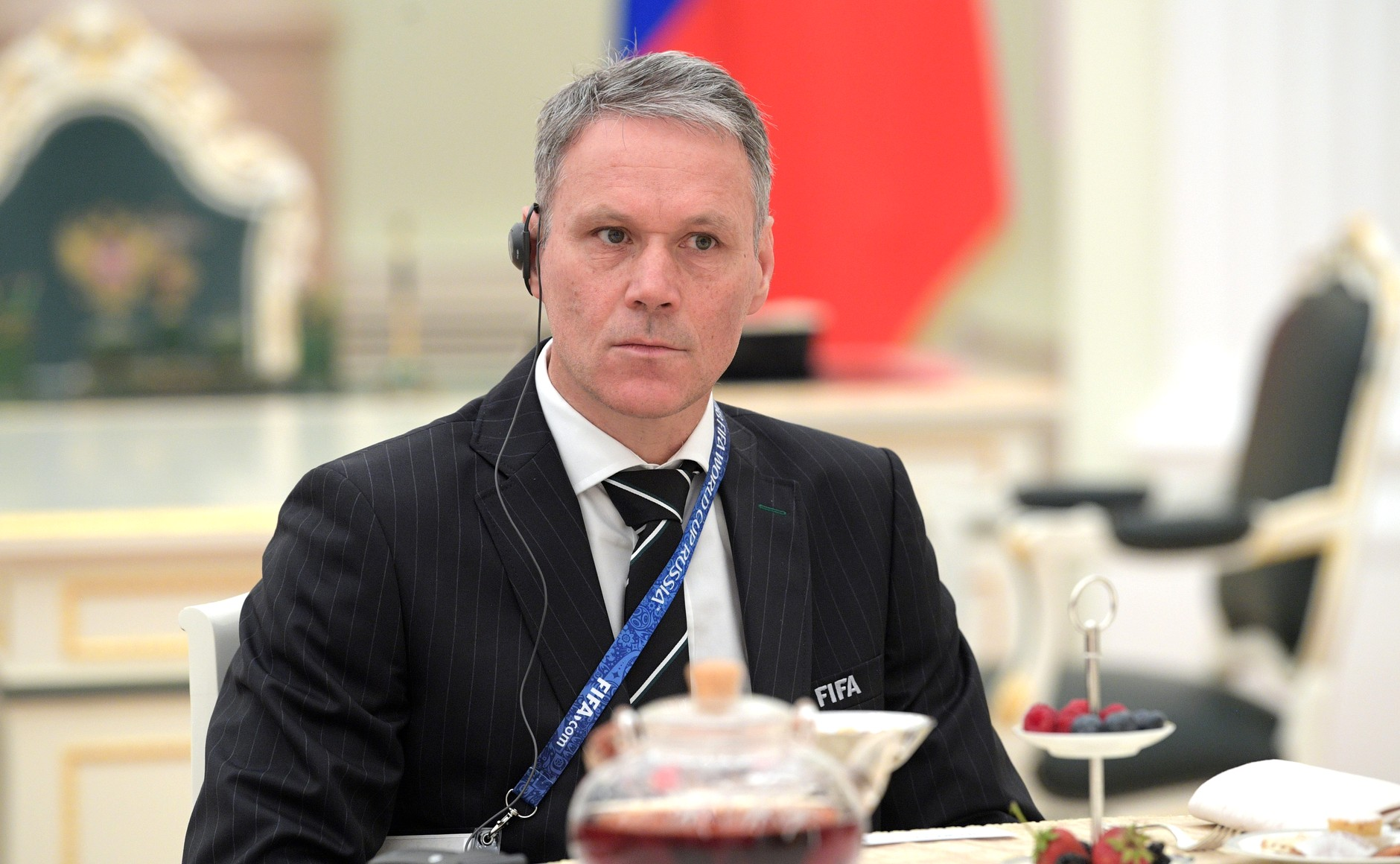
Van Basten as FIFA technical director meeting with Vladimir Putin in Moscow, July 2018

Having last played competitive football in May 1993 and been retired from playing since August 1995, Van Basten returned to the pitch for the first time on 28 October 1997, Franco Baresi's testimonial game at the San Siro. Announced by the host of the game just before Baresi himself, he walked out onto the pitch to a loud standing ovation.

On 6 April 1999, he joined a testimonial between former Ajax players, organized by Johan Cruyff in the then Amsterdam Arena (currently Johan Cruyff Arena). Later that same year, on 21 December, Van Basten joined the "Match of the Century" (Wedstrijd van de Eeuw), a testimonial between a selection of best Dutch national players of the 20th century (selected by Cruyff) versus a squad of former foreign players that played in the Dutch Eredivisie, also hosted in the Amsterdam Arena.

He also played in Demetrio Albertini's testimonial in March 2006, and headed in a goal before being substituted early in the first half.

On 22 July 2006, he played another testimonial, this time to celebrate the 11-year Arsenal career of Dennis Bergkamp, in what was the first match played at the new Emirates Stadium. He entered the match in the second half for the Ajax legends team, as part of a double substitution that also introduced Johan Cruyff.

He took part in Tyskie's (a Polish beer company) advertising campaign with Luís Figo and Zbigniew Boniek.

== Media and sponsorship ==
In August 1996, one year after the formal end of his career, Van Basten looked back on his playing career together with reporter Hugo Borst; they watched a montage of several goals and matches in an interview that was broadcast on Dutch television in two episodes of 50 to 60 minutes each in September 1996.

Van Basten features in EA Sports' FIFA video game series, and was named in the Ultimate Team Legends in FIFA 14. During his career in Italy, Van Basten was sponsored by Italian sportswear company Diadora. One of the most marketable players in the world, in the late 1980s Diadora launched his own personalized football boots, the San Siro Van Basten, earning him two million dollars over 5 years.

After his retirement from coaching, Van Basten became an analyst, and was described by ESPN in 2016 as a "rather cerebral" analyst who "ponders the problems of FIFA and suggests changes to the offside rule." On 23 November 2019, while Van Basten was working as an analyst for the Dutch edition of the Fox Sports network, he said "Sieg Heil" (meaning "Hail victory" in German), a verbal salutation associated with the Nazi salute, during a live broadcast. Van Basten stated that he believed his microphone was off when he made the remark, and that it was in response to his colleague Hans Kraay Jr.'s interview with Heracles's German manager, Frank Wormuth, following the team's 4–1 loss to Ajax. Van Basten said: "It wasn't my intention to shock people, I apologise. I just wanted to make a comment about Hans' German. It was an ill-placed joke." His use of the term attracted particular controversy as it occurred on a weekend during which Dutch football clubs were observing a minute of silence prior to matches in protest against discrimination. Following the incident, the network described Van Basten's comment as "stupid and inappropriate," and suspended him until 7 December. Electronic Arts also announced that Van Basten's cards in FIFA Ultimate Team would no longer be available in FIFA 20 stating the company has "an expectation that our commitment to quality and diversity is upheld." However, he has returned to FIFA 21.

== Personal life ==
Van Basten's formal first name is Marcel, but this was changed to Marco in everyday usage because his maternal grandmother was not able to pronounce his formal name.

Van Basten is the youngest son of former football player Joop van Basten (1930-2014), who played for DOS (which merged with two other clubs into FC Utrecht in 1970) and HVC Amersfoort between 1954 and 1961. He has one older brother and one older sister. His mother Leny suffered from several myocardial infarctions which led to amnesia. His father later turned the bedroom of his youngest son into a small museum, only open to selected visitors.

Van Basten is married to Liesbeth since 1993 and has two daughters and one son with her.

== Career statistics ==
=== Club ===
Appearances and goals by club, season and competition
Club	Season	League			National cup (Note: Includes KNVB Cup, Coppa Italia)		Europe		Other		Total	
Club	Season	Division	Apps	Goals	Apps	Goals	Apps	Goals	Apps	Goals	Apps	Goals
Ajax	1981–82	Eredivisie	1	1	1	0	0	0	–		2	1
Ajax	1982–83	Eredivisie	20	9	5	4	0	0	–		25	13
Ajax	1983–84	Eredivisie	26	28	4	1	2 (Note: Appearances in European Cup)	0	–		32	29
Ajax	1984–85	Eredivisie	33	22	4	2	4 (Note: Appearances in UEFA Cup)	5	–		41	29
Ajax	1985–86	Eredivisie	26	37	3	2	2	0	–		31	39
Ajax	1986–87	Eredivisie	27	31	7	6	9 (Note: Appearances in European Cup Winners' Cup)	6	–		43	43
Ajax	Total		133	128	24	15	17	11	—		174	154
AC Milan	1987–88	Serie A	11	3	5	5	3	0	–		19	8
AC Milan	1988–89	Serie A	33	19	4	3	9	10	1 (Note: Appearance in Supercoppa Italiana)	1	47	33
AC Milan	1989–90	Serie A	26	19	4	1	9	4	3 (Note: Two appearances and one goal in European Super Cup, one appearance in Intercontinental Cup)	1	42	25
AC Milan	1990–91	Serie A	31	11	1	0	2	0	1 (Note: Appearance in Intercontinental Cup)	0	35	11
AC Milan	1991–92	Serie A	31	25	7	4	–		–		38	29
AC Milan	1992–93	Serie A	15	13	1	0	7 (Note: Appearances in UEFA Champions League)	8	1	1	24	22
AC Milan	1993–94	Serie A	0	0	0	0	0	0	–		0	0
AC Milan	1994–95	Serie A	0	0	0	0	0	0	–		0	0
AC Milan	Total		147	90	22	13	30	22	4	3	205	129
Career total			280	218	46	28	47	33	4	3	379	283

=== International ===
Appearances and goals by national team and year
National team	Year	Apps	Goals
Netherlands	1983	3	2
Netherlands	1984	3	0
Netherlands	1985	4	1
Netherlands	1986	4	2
Netherlands	1987	4	1
Netherlands	1988	9	5
Netherlands	1989	5	2
Netherlands	1990	11	8
Netherlands	1991	5	2
Netherlands	1992	10	1
Total		58	24

Scores and results list the Netherlands' goal tally first, score column indicates score after each Van Basten goal.

List of international goals scored by Marco van Basten
No.	Date	Venue	Opponent	Score	Result	Competition
1	21 September 1983	King Baudouin Stadium, Brussels, Belgium	Belgium	1–0	1–1	Friendly
2	12 October 1983	Dalymount Park, Dublin, Republic of Ireland	Republic of Ireland	2–2	3–2	UEFA Euro 1984 qualification
3	27 February 1985	De Meer Stadion, Amsterdam, Netherlands	Cyprus	6–1	7–1	1986 FIFA World Cup qualification
4	12 March 1986	Zentralstadion, Leipzig, East Germany	East Germany	1–0	1–0	Friendly
5	15 October 1986	Népstadion, Budapest, Hungary	Hungary	1–0	1–0	UEFA Euro 1988 qualification
6	25 March 1987	De Kuip, Rotterdam, Netherlands	Greece	1–1	1–1	UEFA Euro 1988 qualification
7	15 June 1988	Rheinstadion, Düsseldorf, West Germany	England	1–0	3–1	UEFA Euro 1988
8	15 June 1988	Rheinstadion, Düsseldorf, West Germany	England	2–1	3–1	UEFA Euro 1988
9	15 June 1988	Rheinstadion, Düsseldorf, West Germany	England	3–1	3–1	UEFA Euro 1988
10	21 June 1988	Volksparkstadion, Hamburg, West Germany	West Germany	2–1	2–1	UEFA Euro 1988
11	25 June 1988	Olympiastadion, Munich, West Germany	Soviet Union	2–0	2–0	UEFA Euro 1988
12	22 March 1989	Philips Stadion, Eindhoven, Netherlands	Soviet Union	1–0	2–0	Friendly
13	26 April 1989	De Kuip, Rotterdam, Netherlands	West Germany	1–1	1–1	1990 FIFA World Cup qualification
14	30 May 1990	Ernst-Happel-Stadion, Vienna, Austria	Austria	2–3	2–3	Friendly
15	3 June 1990	Stadion Maksimir, Zagreb, Yugoslavia	Yugoslavia	2–0	2–0	1990 Yugoslavia v Netherlands football match
16	21 November 1990	De Kuip, Rotterdam, Netherlands	Greece	2–0	2–0	UEFA Euro 1992 qualification
17	19 December 1990	National Stadium, Ta' Qali, Malta	Malta	1–0	8–0	UEFA Euro 1992 qualification
18	19 December 1990	National Stadium, Ta' Qali, Malta	Malta	2–0	8–0	UEFA Euro 1992 qualification
19	19 December 1990	National Stadium, Ta' Qali, Malta	Malta	3–0	8–0	UEFA Euro 1992 qualification
20	19 December 1990	National Stadium, Ta' Qali, Malta	Malta	6–0	8–0	UEFA Euro 1992 qualification
21	19 December 1990	National Stadium, Ta' Qali, Malta	Malta	8–0	8–0	UEFA Euro 1992 qualification
22	13 March 1991	De Kuip, Rotterdam, Netherlands	Malta	1–0	1–0	UEFA Euro 1992 qualification
23	17 April 1991	De Kuip, Rotterdam, Netherlands	Finland	1–0	2–0	UEFA Euro 1992 qualification
24	30 May 1992	Stadion Galgenwaard, Utrecht, Netherlands	Wales	2–0	4–0	Friendly

== Managerial statistics ==
As of 16 September 2014.

Team	From	To	Record					
Team	From	To	M	W	D	L	Win %	Ref.
Netherlands	29 July 2004	30 June 2008	52	35	11	6	67.31	
Ajax	1 July 2008	6 May 2009	45	26	8	11	57.78	
Heerenveen	1 July 2012	30 June 2014	72	27	18	27	37.50	
AZ	1 July 2014	16 September 2014	5	2	0	3	40.00	
Total			174	90	37	47	51.72	—

=== International matches ===
- Matches as manager

Win Draw Loss

Date	Location	Competition	Home team	Away team	Score
2004
18 August 2004	Stockholm	International friendly	Sweden	Netherlands	2–2
3 September 2004	Utrecht	International friendly	Netherlands	Liechtenstein	3–0
8 September 2004	Amsterdam	2006 World Cup Qualification	Netherlands	Czech Republic	2–0
9 October 2004	Skopje	2006 World Cup Qualification	Macedonia	Netherlands	2–2
13 October 2004	Amsterdam	2006 World Cup Qualification	Netherlands	Finland	3–1
17 November 2004	Barcelona	2006 World Cup Qualification	Andorra	Netherlands	0–3
2005
9 February 2005	Birmingham	International friendly	England	Netherlands	0–0
26 March 2005	Bucharest	2006 World Cup Qualification	Romania	Netherlands	0–2
30 March 2005	Eindhoven	2006 World Cup Qualification	Netherlands	Armenia	2–0
4 June 2005	Rotterdam	2006 World Cup Qualification	Netherlands	Romania	2–0
8 June 2005	Helsinki	2006 World Cup Qualification	Finland	Netherlands	0–4
17 August 2005	Rotterdam	International friendly	Netherlands	Germany	2–2
3 September 2005	Yerevan	2006 World Cup Qualification	Armenia	Netherlands	0–1
7 September 2005	Eindhoven	2006 World Cup Qualification	Netherlands	Andorra	4–0
8 October 2005	Prague	2006 World Cup Qualification	Czech Republic	Netherlands	0–2
12 October 2005	Amsterdam	2006 World Cup Qualification	Netherlands	Macedonia	0–0
12 November 2005	Amsterdam	International friendly	Netherlands	Italy	1–3
2006
1 March 2006	Amsterdam	International friendly	Netherlands	Ecuador	1–0
27 May 2006	Rotterdam	International friendly	Netherlands	Cameroon	1–0
1 June 2006	Eindhoven	International friendly	Netherlands	Mexico	2–1
4 June 2006	Rotterdam	International friendly	Netherlands	Australia	1–1
11 June 2006	Leipzig	2006 World Cup Group stage	Serbia and Montenegro	Netherlands	0–1
16 June 2006	Stuttgart	2006 World Cup Group stage	Netherlands	Ivory Coast	2–1
21 June 2006	Frankfurt	2006 World Cup Group stage	Netherlands	Argentina	0–0
25 June 2006	Nuremberg	2006 World Cup Round of 16	Portugal	Netherlands	1–0
16 August 2006	Dublin	International friendly	Ireland	Netherlands	0–4
2 September 2006	Luxembourg	Euro 2008 Qualification	Luxembourg	Netherlands	0–1
6 September 2006	Eindhoven	Euro 2008 Qualification	Netherlands	Belarus	3–0
7 October 2006	Sofia	Euro 2008 Qualification	Bulgaria	Netherlands	1–1
11 October 2006	Amsterdam	Euro 2008 Qualification	Netherlands	Albania	2–1
15 November 2006	Amsterdam	International friendly	Netherlands	England	1–1
2007
7 February 2007	Amsterdam	International friendly	Netherlands	Russia	4–1
24 March 2007	Rotterdam	Euro 2008 Qualification	Netherlands	Romania	4–1

== Honours ==
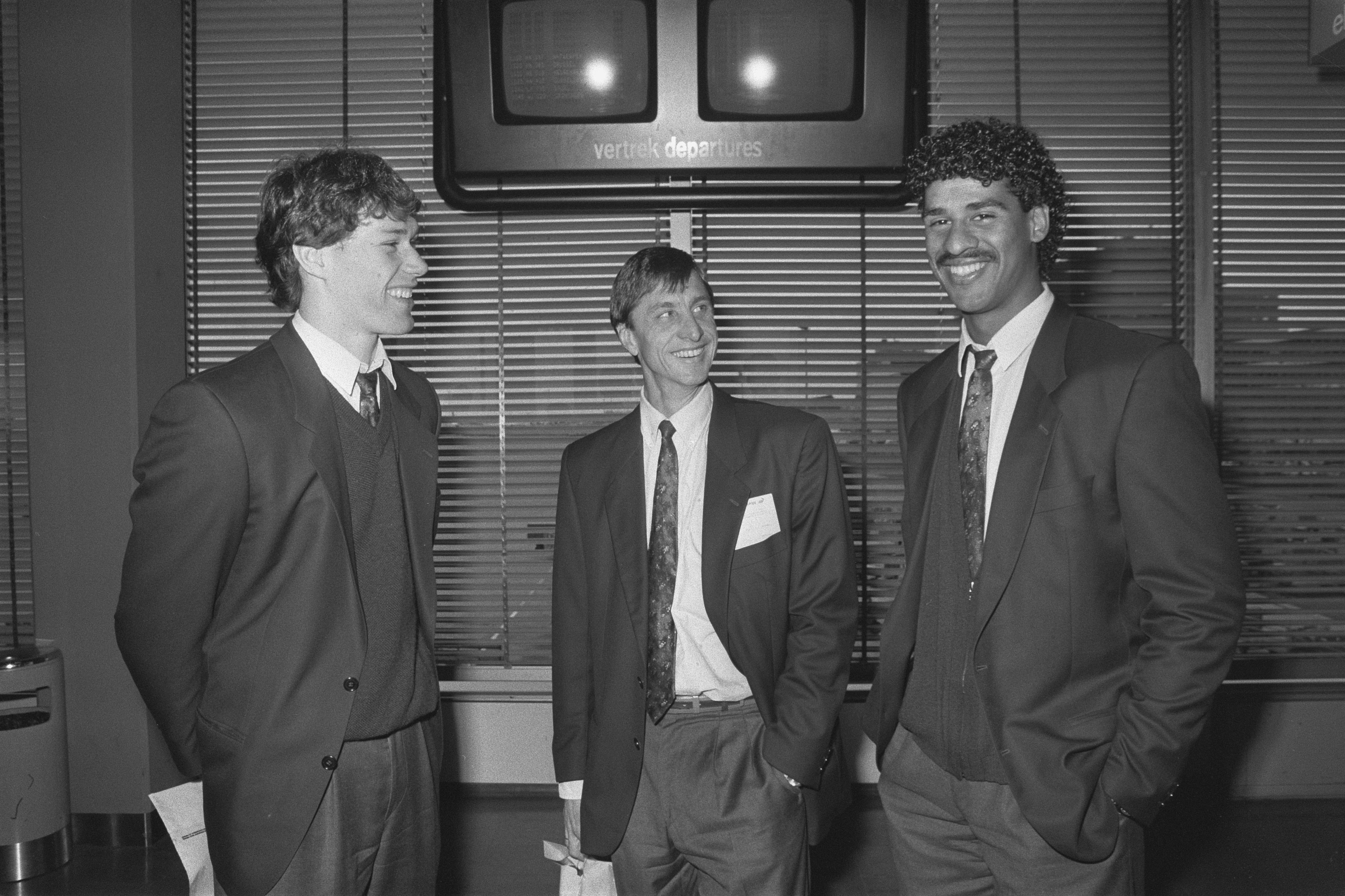
Van Basten won the 1986–87 European Cup Winners' Cup under manager Johan Cruijff as seen here, along with his teammate at both Ajax and AC Milan, Frank Rijkaard.

Ajax

- Eredivisie: 1981–82, 1982–83, 1984–85
- KNVB Cup: 1982–83, 1985–86, 1986–87
- European Cup Winners' Cup: 1986–87

AC Milan

- Serie A: 1987–88, 1991–92, 1992–93, 1993–94
- Supercoppa Italiana: 1988, 1992
- European Cup: 1988–89, 1989–90
- European Super Cup: 1989, 1990
- Intercontinental Cup: 1989, 1990

Netherlands

- UEFA European Championship: 1988

Individual

- Ballon d'Or: 1988, 1989, 1992
- FIFA World Player of the Year: 1992
- UEFA Best Player of the Year: 1989, 1990, 1992
- European Cup Top Scorer: 1988–89
- Capocannoniere: 1989–90, 1991–92
- Eredivisie Top Scorer: 1983–84, 1984–85, 1985–86, 1986–87
- European Silver Boot: 1983–84
- Dutch Footballer of the Year: 1985
- European Golden Boot: 1985–86
- World Golden Boot: 1985–86
- Bravo Award: 1987
- Onze d'Argent: 1987, 1992
- Onze d'Or: 1988, 1989
- Onze de Onze: 1987, 1988, 1989, 1991, 1992
- IFFHS World's Best Player: 1988, 1989
- World Soccer Player of the Year: 1987 (3rd), 1988, 1989 (2nd), 1992
- RSSSF Player of the Year: 1992
- El País King of European Soccer: 1992
- UEFA Euro 1988: Most Valuable Player and Top Scorer with 5 goals
- UEFA European Championship Team of the Tournament: 1988, 1992
- Planète Foot World All-Time Team: 1996
- Planète Foot's 50 of the World's Best Players: 1996
- Venerdì's 100 Magnificent: 1997
- IFFHS Football Player of the Century 12th: 1999
- IFFHS European Player of the Century 10th: 1999
- Placar's 100 Best Players of the Century 26th: 1999
- France Football's Football Player of the Century 8th: 1999
- World Soccer Greatest Players of the 20th Century 9th: 1999
- Guerin Sportivo's 50 Greatest Players of the Century by Adalberto Bortolotti 11th: 1999
- FIFA 100 (List of the greatest living footballers picked by Pelé): 2004
- AFS Top-100 Players of All-Time 12th: 2007
- UEFA Golden Jubilee Poll: #4
- Italian Football Hall of Fame: 2012
- World Hall of Fame of Soccer: 2012
- UEFA Euro All-time XI (published 2016)
- AC Milan Hall of Fame
- IFFHS Legends
- Voetbal International's World Stars by Raf Willems
- Ballon d'Or Dream Team (Bronze): 2020
