= Daniele Massaro =

Italian footballer (born 1961)

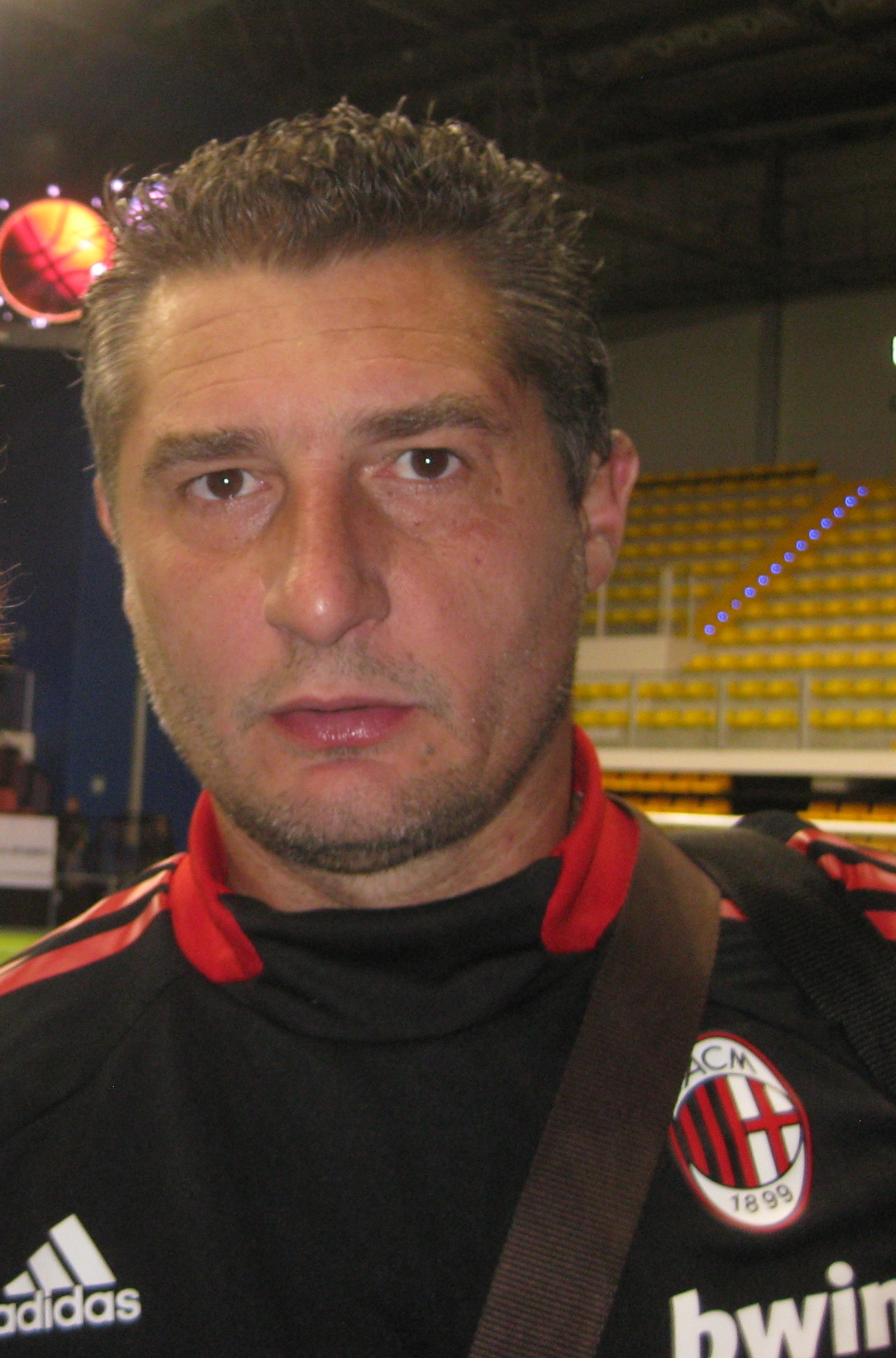
- Massaro in 2010

Personal information
- Full name: Daniele Emilio Massaro
- Date of birth: 23 May 1961 (age 65)
- Place of birth: Monza, Italy
- Height: 1.77 m (5 ft 10 in)
- Position: Forward

Youth career
- 1967–1974: Juvenilia
- 1974–1979: Monza

Senior career*
Years	Team	Apps	(Gls)
1979–1981	Monza	60	(10)
1981–1986	Fiorentina	140	(11)
1986–1995	AC Milan	209	(51)
1988–1989	→ Roma (loan)	30	(5)
1995–1996	Shimizu S-Pulse	20	(10)
Total		459	(87)

International career
1982–1994	Italy	15	(1)
Medal record
Men's football
Representing Italy
FIFA World Cup
Winner	1982 Spain
Runner-up	1994 USA
- * Club domestic league appearances and goals

Daniele Emilio Massaro (Italian pronunciation: [daˈnjɛːle masˈsaːro]; born 23 May 1961) is an Italian former professional footballer who played as a forward.

Throughout his career, Massaro played for several Italian clubs, including Monza, Fiorentina, AC Milan, and Roma, before ending his career in Japan with Shimizu S-Pulse. He is mainly remembered for his highly successful career with AC Milan during the late 1980s and 1990s, under managers Arrigo Sacchi and Fabio Capello, with whom he went on to achieve notable domestic, European, and international success. He won four Serie A titles and two European Cup/UEFA Champions League titles with Milan, among other trophies, notably scoring twice in Milan's 4–0 win over Barcelona in the 1994 Champions League final.

Massaro won 15 caps at the international level, making his debut in 1982, and was also a member of the Italy national team that won the World Cup that year, although he did not make an appearance in the tournament. He was also a member of the team that reached the final of the 1994 FIFA World Cup, scoring a goal during the tournament, his only international goal, in Italy's last group match against Mexico; in the final, his last international appearance, he missed one of Italy's penalties in the resulting shoot-out, as Brazil went on to lift the trophy.

== Club career ==
Massaro began his career with his local club Monza in Serie B in 1978, putting on notable performances during his three seasons with the club alongside his more technically gifted teammate, Paolo Monelli, which attracted the attention of larger clubs. In 1981, he was acquired by Serie A club Fiorentina, along with Monelli, making his Serie A debut on 13 September 1981, and his Italy Under-21 debut 10 days later. He instantly became a permanent member of Fiorentina's starting line-up, and he came close to winning the Scudetto during his first season with the club, missing out on the title to Juventus by a single point. He continued to be an important member of the club during his subsequent seasons in Florence.

After leaving Fiorentina in 1986, Massaro made a name for himself at AC Milan where he played over 300 games between 1986 and 1995 (apart from a loan spell with Roma during the 1988–89 season), and he was part of the legendary Milan squad of the late 1980s and early 1990s, under Arrigo Sacchi and Fabio Capello, which dominated Italy and Europe. Although he won the Scudetto during his second season with the club, he was initially used sparingly and out of position under Sacchi, who did not have faith in his capabilities, and the two began to have several tactical disagreements regarding his true playing position, eventually leading him to be sent out on loan to Roma for a season, in 1988. He returned to Milan during the 1989–90 season, and his consistent, reliable performances now convinced Sacchi, who began to deploy Massaro more frequently; in return, Massaro repaid Sacchi by scoring 10 league goals that season, also winning his first European Cup title with Milan that year, following up the success with two European Super Cups and Intercontinental cups. Whilst playing as a striker, Massaro became more prolific in front of goal, and he also scored two decisive goals in the 1994 UEFA Champions League Final against FC Barcelona, which Milan won 4–0, winning his second European Cup title with the club, under Sacchi's replacement, Capello. He was also Milan's top scorer in the 1993–94 Serie A season with 11 league goals, helping them to win their third consecutive title since 1992 under Capello. In total, during his time with the club, he won four Serie A titles (1988, 1992, 1993, 1994), two UEFA Champions League/European Cup titles (1990, 1994), three UEFA Super Cups (1989, 1990, 1994), two Intercontinental Cups (1989, 1990), and three Italian Supercups (1992, 1993, 1994), also reaching the Coppa Italia final in 1990, two more Champions League finals in 1993 and 1995, and another Intercontinental Cup final in 1994. In the second leg of the 1994 UEFA Super Cup Final against Arsenal in Milan, he set up Zvonimir Boban's goal and later scored another to give Milan a 2–0 aggregate victory.

After leaving Milan in 1995, he played a year in the Japanese football league with Shimizu S-Pulse, before retiring in 1996. On 16 August 1995, he scored his first goal for the club in a 2–1 win over Urawa Reds. On 13 April 1996, he scored a hat-trick in a 5–1 win against Bellmare Hiratsuka.

== International career ==
Massaro made his Italy under-21 debut on 23 September 1981, ten days after his Serie A debut with Fiorentina. Overall, he made four appearances with the Azzurrini between 1981 and 1984, also taking part with Italy's Olympic under-23 side at the 1984 Olympics, where Italy reached the semi-final, finishing the tournament in fourth place. Having surprisingly earned 15 appearances for the Italian senior squad, Massaro's international career actually spanned more than a decade between 1982 and 1994. At the age of 21 on 14 April 1982, Massaro debuted under Enzo Bearzot in a 1–0 loss against East Germany. He was a member of the Italian squad that won the 1982 FIFA World Cup in Spain, but did not receive any playing time during the tournament.

Massaro played between 1984 and 1986, but was called up for Italy's 1994 FIFA World Cup squad by manager Arrigo Sacchi at the age of 33. He played in six of Italy's seven games at said tournament in the United States, and scored a goal in a 1–1 draw against Mexico in Italy's final match of the group stage on 28 June, which allowed them to progress to the knockout round as the best third-placed team. This was his only goal for Italy, making him the country's oldest-ever goalscorer at the FIFA World Cup at the age of 33 years and 36 days. In the 1994 FIFA World Cup final loss against Brazil, he missed a one-on-one opportunity and later failed to convert a penalty kick in the shoot-out, which marked his last international appearance.

== After football ==
He was also the captain of the Italian Beach Soccer National Team for a couple of years. Massaro is also an avid golfer during his free time. After fully retiring from football, he took part in several rally races in the Italian Rally Division, racing twice in the WRC, in the Sanremo Rally (in 1998 and 1999). Massaro currently works with Milan as a public relations manager.

== Style of play ==
A talented and determined player, Massaro was gifted with pace and agility, as well as good physical and athletic attributes. Due to his versatility, work-rate and tactical intelligence, he was uniquely capable of playing in many different positions anywhere on the pitch. Although he is remembered mainly for his performances as a centre forward with Milan, he began his career as a midfielder, and was capable of playing anywhere in midfield; indeed, he was often used as an offensive, central, or defensive midfielder. Throughout his career, he even played as a makeshift defender, both in the centre, or on the flank as a full-back. During his highly successful stint with AC Milan, he was initially deployed as an outside forward on the left, or as a winger under his Milan manager Arrigo Sacchi, due to his good technique. Massaro was only utilised as a true striker later on in his career, in particular under Milan's subsequent manager Fabio Capello, and also at the 1994 World Cup with Italy under Sacchi, where he was able to find the net more often, due to his finishing ability with either foot, as well as his aerial prowess and heading accuracy; in this position, he was also capable of playing off his teammates and of holding up the ball when playing with his back to goal. Due to his tendency to score decisive goals in closely fought matches, most notably his brace in the 1994 UEFA Champions League Final, or in the closing minutes of games, he earned the nicknames Provvidenza ("providence," in Italian) and "San Massaro" in the media. Describing his career experience at Milan, Massaro once referred to himself as a "supersub," due to his penchant for scoring decisive goals after coming off the bench.

== Career statistics ==
=== Club ===
Appearances and goals by club, season and competition
Club	Season	League			National cup (Note: Includes Coppa Italia, Emperor's Cup)		League cup (Note: Includes J.League Cup)		Continental		Other		Total	
Club	Season	Division	Apps	Goals	Apps	Goals	Apps	Goals	Apps	Goals	Apps	Goals	Apps	Goals
Monza	1979–80	Serie B	24	5			–		–		–		24	5
Monza	1980–81	Serie B	36	5			–		–		–		36	5
Monza	Total		60	10			–		–		–		60	10
Fiorentina	1981–82	Serie A	29	1	6	1	–		–		–		35	2
Fiorentina	1982–83	Serie A	30	5	3	0	–		2 (Note: Appearances in UEFA Cup)	0	–		35	5
Fiorentina	1983–84	Serie A	29	1	6	0	–		–		–		35	1
Fiorentina	1984–85	Serie A	26	2	10	1	–		4	0	–		40	3
Fiorentina	1985–86	Serie A	26	2	10	2	–		–		–		36	4
Fiorentina	Total		140	11	35	4	–		6	0	–		181	15
AC Milan	1986–87	Serie A	22	2	1	0	–		–		–		23	2
AC Milan	1987–88	Serie A	26	4	7	1	–		2	0	–		35	5
AC Milan	1989–90	Serie A	30	10	8	3	–		7 (Note: Appearances in European Cup)	2	–		45	15
AC Milan	1990–91	Serie A	21	6	6	1	–		4	0	1 (Note: Appearance in European Super Cup)	0	32	7
AC Milan	1991–92	Serie A	32	9	6	0	–		–		–		38	9
AC Milan	1992–93	Serie A	29	5	7	2	–		9	2	1 (Note: Appearance in Supercoppa Italiana)	1	46	10
AC Milan	1993–94	Serie A	29	11	3	0	–		12 (Note: Appearances in UEFA Champions League)	4	4 (Note: One appearance in Supercoppa Italiana, two appearances in European Super Cup, one appearance and one goal in Intercontinental Cup)	1	48	16
AC Milan	1994–95	Serie A	19	3	1	0	–		8	1	3 (Note: Two appearances and one goal in European Super Cup, one appearance in Intercontinental Cup)	1	31	5
AC Milan	Total		199	51	39	7	–		42	9	9	3	289	70
Roma (loan)	1988–89	Serie A	30	5	1	0	–		1	0	–		32	5
Shimizu S-Pulse	1995	J1 League	9	3	0	0	–		–		–		9	3
Shimizu S-Pulse	1996	J1 League	11	7	0	0	5	1	–		–		16	8
Shimizu S-Pulse	Total		20	10	0	0	5	1	–		–		25	11
Total			437	86	75	11	5	1	49	9	9	3	575	110

=== International ===
Appearances and goals by national team and year
National team	Year	Apps	Goals
Italy	1982	1	0
Italy	1983	0	0
Italy	1984	3	0
Italy	1985	1	0
Italy	1986	1	0
Italy	1987	0	0
Italy	1988	0	0
Italy	1989	0	0
Italy	1990	0	0
Italy	1991	0	0
Italy	1992	0	0
Italy	1993	0	0
Italy	1994	9	1
Total		15	1

Score and result list Italy's goal tally first, score column indicates score after Massaro goal.

International goal scored by Daniele Massaro
No.	Date	Venue	Opponent	Score	Result	Competition
1	28 June 1994	Robert F. Kennedy Memorial Stadium, Washington, United States	Mexico	1–1	1–1	1994 FIFA World Cup

== Honours ==
Milan

- Serie A: 1987–88, 1991–92, 1992–93, 1993–94
- Supercoppa Italiana: 1988, 1992
- European Cup/UEFA Champions League: 1989–90, 1993–94; runner-up: 1992–93, 1994–95
- UEFA Super Cup: 1989, 1990, 1994; runner-up: 1993
- Intercontinental Cup: 1989, 1990; runner-up: 1993, 1994
- Coppa Italia runner-up: 1989–90

Italy

- FIFA World Cup: 1982; runner-up: 1994

Individual

- AC Milan Hall of Fame
- Guerin d'Oro: 1994
