= Virdis =

Virdis is a surname. Notable people with the surname include:

- Francesco Virdis (born 1985), Italian footballer
- Pietro Paolo Virdis (born 1957), Italian footballer and manager

== See also ==
- Virdi
