= Flavio Destro =

Italian footballer and manager (born 1962)

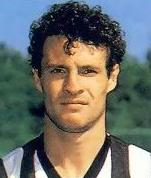

Personal information
- Full name: Flavio Destro
- Date of birth: 28 August 1962 (age 64)
- Place of birth: Rivoli, Italy
- Height: 1.81 m (5 ft 11 1/2 in)
- Position: Defender

Youth career
- 1976–1981: Torino

Senior career*
Years	Team	Apps	(Gls)
1981–1982	Reggina	19	(1)
1982–1983	Rondinella	30	(1)
1983–1985	Catanzaro	60	(1)
1985–1990	Ascoli	142	(2)
1990–1991	Pescara	31	(1)
1991–1993	Cesena	55	(3)
1993–1994	Empoli	18	(0)
Total		355	(9)

Managerial career
- 2008: Montichiari
- 2009–2010: Crotone (assistant manager)
- 2010–2011: Torino (assistant manager)
- 2014: Ascoli
- 2016–2019: Fermana
- 2020–2021: Fano
- * Club domestic league appearances and goals

Flavio Destro (Italian pronunciation: [ˈflaːvjo ˈdɛstro]; born 28 August 1962) is an Italian football manager and former player, who played as a defender.

== Club career ==
=== 1976–1981: Youth career ===
Destro began his youth career at local club Torino, where he played for their Allievi and Primavera side.

=== 1981–1982: Reggina ===
After spending five years with the Granata, Destro signed his first professional contract with Serie C1 club Reggina. In his only season with the Amaranto, he made 19 appearances and scored 1 goal.

=== 1982–1983: Rondinella ===
At the end of the 1981–82 season, he moved to Rondinella and managed 30 appearances and would again score one goal.

=== 1983–1985: Catanzaro ===
Destro then spent two seasons at Catanzaro, where he managed 60 appearances and a single goal.

=== 1985–1990: Ascoli ===
He signed for Ascoli in 1985 and departed the club in 1990. In five seasons at Ascoli, Destro managed 142 appearances and scored 2 goals. His first goal for Ascoli came on 14 February 1988 at home against Milan in Serie A. The Rossoneri then equalised through Daniele Massaro to make it honours even.

=== 1990–1994: Pescara, Cesena and Empoli ===
A single season at Pescara was followed by a two-year spell with Cesena. Before hanging up his boots forever, the veteran defender spent one last season at Empoli, where he played 18 times without registering a goal.

== Post-retirement ==
Following his retirement from football, Destro then pursued a career in coaching football. He currently lives in Ascoli Piceno, the birthplace of his son.

== Managerial career ==
Destro managed Lega Pro Seconda Divisione club Montichiari in 2008. He was then made assistant manager at both Crotone in (2009–10), and Torino in (2010–11). Destro returned to former club Ascoli, where he was appointed manager in 2014. Serie D side Fermana announced Destro as their new manager in March 2016. He guided Fermana to promotion to Serie C in 2017, and a place in the Serie C promotion playoffs in 2019. On 14 October 2019, he was fired by Fermana with squad in 16th place and no victories in 5 games.

On 2 November 2020, he was hired by Serie C club Fano. He resigned on 22 March 2021 after a league defeat to Virtus Verona.

== Personal life ==
Destro is the father of Bologna and Italy forward Mattia Destro. His daughter-in-law is the Italian showgirl Ludovica Caramis.

== Honours ==
=== Club ===
Ascoli

- Serie B: 1985–86
- Mitropa Cup: 1986–87
