= Rufo Emiliano Verga =

Italian footballer

Personal information
- Date of birth: 21 December 1969 (age 56)
- Place of birth: Legnano, Italy
- Height: 1.84 m (6 ft 1/2 in)
- Position: Midfielder

Senior career*
Years	Team	Apps	(Gls)
1987–1990	Milan	3	(0)
1988–1989	→ Parma (loan)	17	(2)
1990–1991	Bologna	26	(0)
1991–1992	Lazio	6	(0)
1992–1993	Fiorentina	4	(0)
1992–1993	→ Venezia (loan)	19	(0)
1993	Milan	0	(0)
1993–1994	Lecce	14	(0)
- * Club domestic league appearances and goals

Rufo Emiliano Verga (born 21 December 1969) is an Italian retired professional footballer who played as a midfielder.

He represented Italy at the 1992 Summer Olympics.

He had to retire young due to knee problems and now runs a café in Richmond, California.

== Honours ==
Milan

- Serie A: 1987–88

Italy U21

- UEFA European Under-21 Championship: 1992
