= Angelo Colombo =

Italian footballer (born 1961)

Personal information
- Full name: Angelo Colombo
- Date of birth: 24 February 1961 (age 65)
- Place of birth: Mezzago, Italy
- Height: 1.77 m (5 ft 10 in)
- Position: Midfielder

Senior career*
Years	Team	Apps	(Gls)
1979–1984	Monza	108	(4)
1984–1985	Avellino	30	(6)
1985–1987	Udinese	51	(1)
1987–1990	Milan	77	(7)
1990–1992	Bari	26	(2)
1994–1995	Marconi Stallions	17	(2)
Total		309	(22)

International career
1988	Italy Olympic	5	(0)

Managerial career
- 2009: Calcio Montebelluna
- 2010–2011: Carpenedolo
- * Club domestic league appearances and goals

Angelo Colombo (born 24 February 1961) is an Italian former footballer who played for Milan as a midfielder, and was part of their European Cup victories in 1989 and 1990. He is now a scout for the club.

== Club career ==
Angelo Colombo began his career with the Monza in 1979, first with the youth squad, at the age of 13, and later making his professional debut with the club in Serie B. In 1984, he was acquired by Pierpaolo Marino's Avellino side, and he made his Serie A debut with the club on 16 September 1984, in a 0–0 home draw against Roma.

The following season, he transferred to Udinese, in 1985, and in 1987, he was bought by Milan, under manager Arrigo Sacchi, making his club debut in the Coppa Italia on 23 August 1987, in a 5–0 win over Bari. He enjoyed a successful three-season spell with Milan, winning the 1987–88 Serie A title, the 1988 Supercoppa Italiana, consecutive European Cups (1988–89 and 1989–90), as well as the 1989 Intercontinental Cup, and the 1989 European Super Cup, with his final appearance coming in Milan's 1–0 victory over Benfica in the 1990 European Cup Final on 23 May; in total he made 115 appearances for the club between 1987 and 1990, scoring 7 goals, all of which came in his 77 Serie A appearances with the club.

In 1990, he moved to Bari, at the request of Salvemini, to replace Carbone, who had recently been purchased by his former club Milan. In 1992, he left the club, temporarily retiring from football, although in 1994, he returned to football, signing for Australian side Marconi Stallions, with whom he ended his career after the 1994–95 season.

== International career ==
Although he was never capped for the Italian senior side, Colombo played for the Italy Under-21 side at the 1988 Summer Olympics, where they reached the semi-finals, finishing the tournament in fourth place.

== Style of play ==
Colombo was capable of playing both as a wide midfielder on either flank (although he was usually deployed on the right) and in the centre as a defensive midfielder. Although not particularly prolific, talented, or skilful from a technical standpoint, he was known for being a quick, determined, selfless, and energetic team player, who was often involved in the build-up of the team's attacking plays. However, he stood out in particular for his stamina, tenacity, intelligence, attacking movement off the ball, and defensive work-rate, as well as his ball-winning abilities, which made him a key player in Sacchi's legendary Milan side of the late 80s, and which allowed him to contribute at both ends of the pitch. Along with his partner Alberigo Evani on the opposite flank, he was often tasked with covering defensively for the overlapping runs of Milan's attacking full-backs, namely Mauro Tassotti on the right, while his defensive skills also enabled him to form a strong partnership with fellow holding midfielder Frank Rijkaard in midfield. Sacchi himself once even described Colombo as being "tactically more important than Maradona." In addition to his qualities as a player, he also stood out for his long blonde hair.

== Managerial career ==
After retiring, Colombo coached the Milan youth side for five years, and later became their co-ordinator for four more years, and subsequently a scout for the team. On 26 January 2009, he signed a contract to coach Montebelluna in Serie D, replacing Gianfranco Borgato, and saving the team from relegation in the play-off against Somma.

In May 2010, he took charge of Carpenedolo during the 2009–10 Lega Pro Second Division play-offs against Villacidrese, which ended with the club's relegation to Serie D at the end of the season. The following season, the team were defeated in the Serie D play-off against Mobilieri Ponsacco, but the team were not relegated to the Eccellenza League, as they were re-drawn. On 30 October 2011, Colombo was sacked, as the team were second last during the 2011–12 Serie D season.

== Honours ==
=== Club ===
Milan

- Serie A: 1987–88
- Supercoppa Italiana: 1988
- European Cup: 1988–89, 1989–90
- European Super Cup: 1989
- Intercontinental Cup: 1989
