= Walter Bianchi =

Swiss-born Italian footballer

Personal information
- Date of birth: 7 November 1963 (age 62)
- Place of birth: Aarau, Switzerland
- Height: 1.77 m (5 ft 10 in)
- Position: Defender

Senior career*
Years	Team	Apps	(Gls)
1981–1982	Cesena	0	(0)
1982–1983	Rimini	33	(0)
1983–1984	Brescia	9	(0)
1984–1985	Rimini	32	(0)
1985–1987	Parma	68	(2)
1987–1989	AC Milan	5	(0)
1989–1990	Torino	18	(0)
1990–1991	Verona	0	(0)
1991–1992	Cosenza	27	(0)
1992–1994	Verona	17	(0)
- * Club domestic league appearances and goals

Walter Bianchi (born 7 November 1963) is an Italian former professional footballer who played as a defender, usually as a left-back, although he was also capable of playing on the right.

== Playing career ==
Bianchi made his Serie A debut with AC Milan on 13 September 1987, in a 3–1 away win over Pisa. He spent two seasons with the club, who were being coached by Arrigo Sacchi at the time, playing five games in Serie A; he won the 1987–88 Serie A title with the club and the 1988–89 European Cup.

His career was hampered by injuries; he had to undergo ten surgeries in twelve years overall.

On 28 July 1992, he was hurt in a traffic accident involving the team bus of Hellas Verona F.C. and fell into a coma for several days. He recovered in a few months.

== Honours ==
AC Milan

- Serie A champion: 1987–88.
- Supercoppa Italiana winner: 1988.
- European Cup winner: 1988–89.
