= Davide Zannoni =

Italian composer

Davide Zannoni (born 1958 in Spoleto, Italy) is a composer of contemporary Classical music.

== Biography ==
Zannoni began his career playing drums in jazz clubs and later symphonic percussion with the Maggio Musicale Fiorentino Orchestra, and the Orchestra Regionale della Toscana (https://it.wikipedia.org/wiki/Orchestra_della_Toscana) in Florence, Italy. He played under conductors such as Zubin Mehta, Lorin Maazel inter alia. He also pursued academic studies and earned a doctoral degree in Humanities from the University of Bologna, writing a dissertation on the technical features of the music of Edgard Varese. He studied composition at the Fiesole School of Music in Florence with Antonino Riccardo Luciani and took private lessons in orchestration with Gaetano Giani Luporini in Lucca. After moving to New York in 1988, he received a master's degree in Music from Queens College, where he studied with Thea Musgrave, Leo Kraft and Carl Schachter.

Zannoni's music has been choreographed in the US and Italy by the Alvin Ailey American Dance Theater. He has written the soundtrack for the award-winning documentary "Where did Forever Go". Zannoni has received grants and awards from The American Music Center, Meet_The_Composer, and New York State Council on the Arts. His catalog includes works for orchestra, choir, and chamber ensembles. A significant portion of his output is devoted to music for percussion. His works have been recorded on several CD’s.

Zannoni's style has been described by Roman Turovsky as "idiosyncratic and hard to categorize compositional language that includes elements from different musical traditions, in an alternation and at times superimposition of harsh dissonance and moving lyricism. Strong rhythmic pulses and jazz harmonies coexist with late Romantic and lyrical episodes, often weaving in and out of tonality. Here and there distorted and barely recognizable quotes from pop songs from his childhood emerge, something that Mr. Zannoni in his program notes has called "ghosts, floating relics from his musical memory".

Zannoni has received commissions and grants from many organizations and performers both in Italy and the U.S., such as from pianist Steven Blier and the New York Festival of Song, Mimi Stern Wolfe and Downtown Music Productions, violinist Stefan Milenkovich, percussionists James Preiss (one of the founding members of Steve Reich and Musicians), Greg Giannascoli, et al. Zannoni has received grants and awards from The American Music Center, Meet the Composer, and New York State Council on the Arts. His music is published by Edipan, Mnemes and Ut Orpheus.

== Discography ==
- The Color Duo "Hemisphaeria" ("Simmetrie di Paradiso") 2018
- The Emerald Trio ("Passions of the Present"), NAXOS 2017
- Piano Duo Five O'Clock "Italian Connection", Amroc label
- Tetraktis Percussione "Drama" 2008
- Nicola Mazzanti "The Crazy Acrobat"Not On Label – CDNM002
- Greg Giannascoli "Hammer" 2005, WMM3
- Guido Arbonelli "Namaste Suite" 2003 Mnemes label
- Ivano Ascari "Nuove Musiche per Tromba, vol. 8" Sonica studios AZ3697
- Ivano Ascari "Nuove Musiche per Tromba, vol. 5" Sonica studios
- Ivano Ascari "Nuove Musiche per Tromba, vol. 3" Sonica studios AZ2112
- "Christmas with The Manhattan Choral Ensemble"
- "Links" (Partita per un Percussionista) - Federico Poli
- Jikkai
