= Virdi =

Virdi is a Punjabi surname. Notable people with this surname include:

- Amar Virdi, English cricket player
- Ginnie Virdi, Indian television actress
- Gurpal Virdi (born 1958), politician
- Harvey Virdi, actress and writer
- Kanwar Virdi (born 1969), Indian cricket player
- Roger Verdi (born 1953), English footballer
- R. R. Virdi (born 1990), American author
- Sonia Birdi, Kenyan politician
