= Helmut Kohl (referee) =

Austrian football referee (1943–1991)

- Born: 8 February 1943
- Died: 26 September 1991 (aged 48)
- Other occupation: Butcher

Domestic
Years	League	Role
1981–1990	Bundesliga	Referee

International
Years	League	Role
1984–1990	FIFA listed	Referee

Helmut Kohl (8 February 1943 – 26 September 1991) was an Austrian football referee who officiated three matches in the 1990 FIFA World Cup in Italy and the 1990 European Cup Final. He died little over a year later at the age of 48.
