= Andrea Pazzagli =

Italian footballer (1960-2011)

Personal information
- Date of birth: 18 January 1960
- Place of birth: Florence, Italy
- Date of death: 31 July 2011 (aged 51)
- Place of death: Punta Ala, Italy
- Height: 1.93 m (6 ft 4 in)
- Position: Goalkeeper

Senior career*
| Years | Team | Apps | (Gls) |
| 1978–1979 | Imola | 15 | (0) |
| 1979–1980 | Bologna | 0 | (0) |
| 1980–1981 | Udinese | 2 | (0) |
| 1981–1982 | Catania | 1 | (0) |
| 1982–1983 | Bologna | 0 | (0) |
| 1983–1984 | Rondinella | 26 | (0) |
| 1984–1986 | Perugia | 76 | (0) |
| 1986–1989 | Ascoli | 93 | (0) |
| 1989–1991 | Milan | 48 | (0) |
| 1991–1993 | Bologna | 47 | (0) |
| 1993–1994 | Roma | 0 | (0) |
| 1994–1996 | Prato | 20 | (0) |
| Total | | 328 | (0) |
- * Club domestic league appearances and goals

Andrea Pazzagli (18 January 1960 – 31 July 2011) was an Italian footballer who played as a goalkeeper, most notably for A.C. Milan in the late 1980s and early 1990s.

== Career ==
Throughout his career, Pazzagli played for Imola (1978–1979), Bologna (1979–1980; 1982–1983; 1991–1993), Udinese (1980–1981), Catania (1981–1982), Rondinella (1983–1984), Perugia (1984–1986), Ascoli (1986–1989), Milan (1989–1991), Roma (1993–1994), and Prato (1994–1996). With Milan, although he was initially a back-up keeper behind Giovanni Galli, he later broke into the starting line-up under manager Arrigo Sacchi, featuring in Milan's 1990 Intercontinental Cup and 1990 European Super Cup victories, after being left on the bench for the 1989 UEFA Super Cup and the 1989 Intercontinental Cup final victories, also winning the 1989–90 European Cup during his time with the club.

== After retirement ==
After retiring, he became a goalkeeping coach; after working for A.C. Milan and Fiorentina, in 2011 he joined the Italy national team coaching staff.

Pazzagli died of a heart attack on 31 July 2011 whilst on holiday in Punta Ala, Tuscany.

Pazzagli's son Edoardo followed in his footsteps and also became a goalkeeper.

== Honours ==
Ascoli

- Mitropa Cup: 1986–87

Milan

- UEFA Champions League: 1989–90
- UEFA Super Cup: 1989, 1990
- Intercontinental Cup: 1989, 1990
