= 1987–88 Serie A =

86th season of top-tier Italian football

Serie A
- Season: 1987–88
- Dates: 13 September 1987 – 15 May 1988
- Champions: Milan; 11th title
- Relegated: Avellino; Empoli
- European Cup: Milan
- Cup Winners' Cup: Sampdoria
- UEFA Cup: Napoli; Roma; Internazionale; Juventus
- Matches: 240
- Goals: 504 (2.1 per match)
- Top goalscorer: Diego Maradona (15 goals)
- Longest winning run: 18 matches Napoli
- Longest unbeaten run: 19 matches Milan
- Longest winless run: 5 matches Avellino
- Longest losing run: 14 matches Pescara
- All statistics correct as of 15 May 1988.

Serie A 1987-88 team distribution

The 1987–88 Serie A was won by Milan.

== Teams ==
Pescara, Pisa and Cesena had been promoted from Serie B.

== Season summary ==
The summer of 1987 brought several notable players into the Italian championship: Vincenzo Scifo (for Internazionale), Ian Rush (Juventus), Ruud Gullit and Marco van Basten (Milan). The reigning champions Napoli started well leading the league after five matches. Inter and Juventus had several issues.

Napoli retained top-place in autumn and winter, suffering only one defeat in the first 20 games. Napoli began to struggle in March, and ultimately only won 2 of the 10 remaining fixtures. Milan who had been in second place for much of the season were able to reduce the points deficit with a prolonged undefeated run. Their head-to-head match, played on 1 May 1988, ended in a 3–2 win for Milan putting them 1 point ahead in the title race with two games remaining to play. Milan drew their final games, but Napoli did worse, losing both matches. It led to Milan's 11th title and its first since 1979. This season was the last with 16 teams playing, as two relegations and four promotions from Serie B meant that from 1988–89 there would be 18 clubs in the top flight.

== Final classification ==
Pos	Team	Pld	W	D	L	GF	GA	GD	Pts	Qualification or relegation
1	Milan (C)	30	17	11	2	43	14	+29	45	Qualification to European Cup
2	Napoli	30	18	6	6	55	27	+28	42	Qualification to UEFA Cup
3	Roma	30	15	8	7	39	26	+13	38	Qualification to UEFA Cup
4	Sampdoria	30	13	11	6	41	30	+11	37	Qualification to Cup Winners' Cup
5	Internazionale	30	11	10	9	42	35	+7	32	Qualification to UEFA Cup
6	Juventus (Note: Juventus won the UEFA Cup qualification match against Torino 0–0*(4:2) then qualified to 1988–89 UEFA Cup.)	30	11	9	10	35	30	+5	31	Qualification to UEFA Cup
7	Torino	30	8	15	7	33	30	+3	31	
8	Fiorentina	30	9	10	11	29	33	−4	28	
9	Cesena	30	7	12	11	23	32	−9	26	
10	Hellas Verona	30	7	11	12	23	30	−7	25	
11	Como	30	6	13	11	22	37	−15	25	
12	Ascoli	30	6	12	12	30	37	−7	24	
13	Pisa	30	6	12	12	23	30	−7	24	
14	Pescara	30	8	8	14	27	44	−17	24	
15	Avellino (R)	30	5	13	12	19	39	−20	23	Relegation to Serie B
16	Empoli (Note: Empoli was penalised of 5 points from the start of the season.) (R)	30	6	13	11	20	30	−10	20	Relegation to Serie B

Source: 1987–88 Serie A, RSSSF.com
Rules for classification: 1) Points; 2) Head-to-head points; 3) Head-to-head goal difference; 4) Goal difference; 5) Goals scored; 6) Draw.
(C) Champions; (R) Relegated

== Results ==
Home \ Away	ASC	AVE	CES	COM	EMP	FIO	INT	JUV	MIL	NAP	PES	PIS	ROM	SAM	TOR	VER
Ascoli	—	2–0	0–0	0–0	2–0	3–0	2–1	1–1	1–1	1–3	2–1	2–2	1–1	1–1	3–0	1–1
Avellino	1–1	—	1–1	1–1	1–0	1–1	1–3	1–0	0–0	0–1	1–1	1–0	2–3	1–2	2–1	1–0
Cesena	1–0	1–1	—	3–0	1–1	1–0	2–2	0–0	0–0	0–1	0–1	1–1	0–0	2–0	0–0	1–0
Como	3–1	0–0	2–0	—	3–2	1–0	1–2	1–1	1–1	0–0	2–1	0–0	0–1	0–1	0–0	1–1
Empoli	2–0	0–0	2–2	1–1	—	0–0	1–1	1–0	0–0	0–0	3–2	0–1	2–1	2–2	0–0	1–0
Fiorentina	1–0	2–1	3–1	1–1	0–0	—	1–2	1–1	1–1	3–2	4–0	0–0	1–0	1–1	1–0	0–0
Internazionale	2–2	1–1	2–0	1–0	2–0	3–0	—	2–1	0–1	1–1	0–2	2–1	4–2	3–1	0–1	1–1
Juventus	1–0	3–0	0–2	1–0	4–0	1–2	1–0	—	0–1	3–1	3–1	2–1	1–0	1–1	2–1	0–0
Milan	2–0	3–0	3–0	5–0	1–0	0–2	2–0	0–0	—	4–1	2–0	1–0	0–2	2–1	0–0	0–0
Napoli	2–1	4–0	2–0	3–0	2–1	4–0	1–0	2–1	2–3	—	6–0	2–1	1–2	1–2	3–1	4–1
Pescara	0–0	2–0	1–0	2–0	0–0	1–1	1–1	2–0	0–2	0–1	—	2–1	0–0	0–0	2–2	3–0
Pisa	1–1	0–0	1–0	1–1	0–0	2–1	2–1	1–2	1–3	0–2	2–0	—	1–1	0–1	2–0	0–0
Roma	3–0	0–0	2–0	3–1	1–0	2–1	3–2	2–0	0–2	1–1	5–1	1–0	—	0–2	1–1	1–0
Sampdoria	2–0	2–0	4–1	3–0	2–0	1–0	1–1	2–2	1–1	0–1	2–1	0–0	0–0	—	1–1	3–1
Torino	2–1	0–0	2–2	1–1	0–1	2–1	1–1	2–2	1–1	0–0	2–0	3–1	2–0	4–1	—	1–1
Hellas Verona	2–1	4–1	0–1	0–1	1–0	1–0	1–1	2–1	0–1	1–1	2–0	0–0	0–1	3–1	0–2	—

Legend: Blue = home team win; Yellow = draw; Red = away team win.

== UEFA Cup qualification ==
23 May 1988

Juventus	0–0 (a.e.t.)	Torino
Penalties
Vignola (penalty scored); De Agostini (penalty scored); Brio (penalty missed); Cabrini (penalty scored); Rush (penalty scored)	4–2	(penalty scored) Cravero; (penalty scored) Bresciani; (penalty missed) Comi; (penalty missed) Benedetti

Stadio Comunale Vittorio Pozzo, Turin
Referee: Pietro D'Elia (Salerno)

Juventus qualified for 1988–89 UEFA Cup.

== Top goalscorers ==
Rank	Player	Club	Goals
1	(Argentina) Diego Maradona	Napoli	15
2	(Brazil) Careca	Napoli	13
3	(Italy) Pietro Paolo Virdis	Milan	11
3	(Italy) Giuseppe Giannini	Roma	11
5	(Italy) Gianluca Vialli	Sampdoria	10
6	(Netherlands) Ruud Gullit	Milan	9
6	(Austria) Walter Schachner	Avellino	9
6	(Italy) Alessandro Altobelli	Internazionale	9
6	(Austria) Toni Polster	Torino	9

== Attendances ==
SSC Napoli drew the highest average home attendance in the 1987-88 edition of the Serie A.

#	Football club	Home games	Average attendance
1	SSC Napoli	15	73,745
2	AC Milan	15	72,177
3	Internazionale	15	47,502
4	AS Roma	15	43,696
5	Juventus	15	32,732
6	Fiorentina	15	31,254
7	Torino FC	15	29,071
8	Hellas Verona	15	27,077
9	US Avellino	15	23,219
10	Pescara Calcio	15	22,961
11	AC Cesena	15	18,054
12	Sampdoria	15	17,440
13	Pisa SC	15	16,590
14	Ascoli Calcio	15	15,150
15	Empoli FC	15	10,977
16	Como Calcio	15	10,852

== See also ==
- 1987–88 A.C. Milan season

== Sources ==
- Panini Group, ed. (1988). Almanacco Illustrato del Calcio 1989 (in Italian). Modena.
