= 1993–94 Galatasaray S.K. season =

Galatasaray
1993–94 season
- President: (Turkey) Alp Yalman
- Manager: (Germany) Reiner Hollmann
- Stadium: Ali Sami Yen Stadı
- 1. Lig: 1st
- Türkiye Kupası: Runner-up
- Champions League: Group stage
- 1993 Süper Kupa: Winner
- 1994 Süper Kupa: Runner-up
- Top goalscorer: League: Hakan Şükür (16); All: Hakan Şükür (20)
- Highest home attendance: 31,998 vs Bursaspor (1. Lig, 15 May 1994)
- Lowest home attendance: 3,984 vs Samsunspor (1. Lig, 13 February 1994)
- Average home league attendance: 17,743
Home colours	Away colours	Third colours

The 1993–94 season was Galatasaray's 90th in existence and the 36th consecutive season in the 1. Lig. This article shows statistics of the club's players in the season, and also lists all matches that the club have played in the season.

== Squad statistics ==
No.	Pos.	Name	1. Lig		Türkiye Kupası		Champions League		Süper Kupa		Total	
No.	Pos.	Name	Apps	Goals	Apps	Goals	Apps	Goals	Apps	Goals	Apps	Goals
1	GK	(Turkey) Hayrettin Demirbaş	30	0	6	0	10	0	2	0	48	0
-	GK	(Turkey) Nezih Boloğlu	0	0	0	0	0	0	0	0	0	0
-	DF	(Turkey) Cihat Arslan	8	0	2	1	1	0	0	0	11	1
3	DF	(Turkey) Bülent Korkmaz	30	1	5	1	9	0	2	0	46	2
-	DF	(Turkey) Mert Korkmaz	20	1	4	0	7	0	2	0	33	1
-	DF	(Turkey) Soner Tolungüç	9	1	2	0	1	0	2	0	14	1
-	DF	(Turkey) Yusuf Altıntaş	9	1	1	2	0	0	0	0	12	1
2	DF	(Turkey) Reinhard Stumpf	18	0	4	0	7	0	1	0	30	0
-	MF	(Turkey) Cengizhan Hınçal	2	0	1	0	0	0	0	0	3	0
-	MF	(Turkey) Yusuf Tepekule	26	0	5	0	9	0	2	0	42	0
7	MF	(Turkey) Okan Buruk	2	0	0	0	2	0	0	0	4	0
-	MF	(Turkey) Hamza Hamzaoğlu	27	3	6	10	0	0	2	0	45	9
11	MF	(Switzerland) Kubilay Türkyılmaz	12	4	0	0	7	4	1	0	20	8
8	MF	(Turkey) Tugay Kerimoğlu	26	10	5	0	10	0	2	0	43	10
10	MF	(Turkey) Suat Kaya	27	8	5	9	0	0	2	1	43	9
-	MF	(Turkey) Mustafa Kocabey	13	0	4	2	2	0	1	1	20	3
4	MF	(Germany) Falko Götz	23	5	4	1	9	0	2	0	38	6
-	FW	(Turkey) Erdal Keser (C)	16	2	3	0	7	0	0	0	26	2
6	FW	(Turkey) Arif Erdem	26	9	5	2	9	2	1	0	41	13
-	FW	(Turkey) Uğur Tütüneker	18	2	4	0	8	0	0	0	30	2
-	FW	(Turkey) Benhur Babaoğlu	3	0	1	0	1	0	1	0	6	0
5	FW	(Sweden) Roger Ljung	15	2	5	0	0	0	0	0	20	2
9	FW	(Turkey) Hakan Şükür	27	16	5	3	9	0	2	1	43	20

=== Players in / out ===
==== In ====
Pos.	Nat.	Name	Age	Moving from
FW	(Switzerland)	Kubilay Türkyılmaz	26	Bologna F.C. 1909
MF	(Turkey)	Yusuf Tepekule	25	Karşıyaka SK
DF	(Turkey)	Cihat Arslan	23	Karşıyaka SK
FW	(Turkey)	Benhur Babaoğlu	23	Malatyaspor
DF	(Turkey)	Soner Tolungüç	29	Sarıyer G.K.
FW	(Sweden)	Roger Ljung	27	FC Admira Wacker

==== Out ====
Pos.	Nat.	Name	Age	Moving to
FW	(Germany)	Torsten Gütschow	31	FC Carl Zeiss Jena
MF	(Turkey)	Tayfun Hut	26	MKE Ankaragücü
FW	(Turkey)	Şevket Candar	27	MKE Ankaragücü
FW	(Bosnia and Herzegovina)	Elvir Bolić	22	Gaziantepspor
MF	(Turkey)	Seyfettin Kurtulmuş	20	Denizlispor

== 1. Lig ==
=== Standings ===
Pos	Team	Pld	W	D	L	GF	GA	GD	Pts	Qualification or relegation
1	Galatasaray (C)	30	22	4	4	67	28	+39	70	Qualification to Champions League qualifying round
2	Fenerbahçe	30	21	6	3	69	26	+43	69	Qualification to UEFA Cup preliminary round
3	Trabzonspor	30	17	8	5	67	28	+39	59	Qualification to UEFA Cup first round
4	Beşiktaş	30	16	6	8	58	30	+28	54	Qualification to Cup Winners' Cup first round
5	Samsunspor	30	15	5	10	53	47	+6	50	

Rules for classification: 1) points; 2) goal difference; 3) number of goals scored.
(C) Champions

=== Matches ===
28 August 1993 1	Galatasaray	3 – 0	Zeytinburnuspor	Istanbul
18:00 CET	Hakan 22', 77', 85'	Report		Stadium: Ali Sami Yen Stadium; Attendance: 13,015; Referee: Serdar Çakır

5 September 1993 2	Samsunspor	1 – 1	Galatasaray	Samsun
14:30 CET	Hanganu 70'	Report	Hakan 15'	Stadium: Samsun 19 Mayıs Stadium; Referee: Erman Toroğlu

12 September 1993 3	Galatasaray	2 – 0	Karşıyaka	Istanbul
17:00 CET	Kubilay 58'; Suat 89'	Report		Stadium: Ali Sami Yen Stadium; Attendance: 15,128; Referee: Bülent Yavuz

19 September 1993 4	Ankaragücü	2 – 4	Galatasaray	Ankara
14:30 CET	Hakan 10'; Agachkov 83'	Report	Kubilay 2'; Arif 7'; Götz 43'; Hakan 89'	Stadium: Ankara 19 Mayıs Stadium; Attendance: 12,465; Referee: Ünsal Çimen

25 September 1993 5	Galatasaray	0 – 0	Karabükspor	Istanbul
18:00 CET		Report		Stadium: Ali Sami Yen Stadium; Attendance: 13,197; Referee: Yusuf Yaylı

2 October 1993 6	Fenerbahçe	2 – 0	Galatasaray	Istanbul
18:00 CET	Oğuz 40'; Bülent 89' (pen.)	Report		Stadium: Şükrü Saracoğlu Stadium; Attendance: 25,168; Referee: Oğuz Sarvan

10 October 1993 7	Trabzonspor	1 – 2	Galatasaray	Trabzon
11:00 CET	Mert 71' (o.g.)	Report	Hamza 9'; Yusuf 40' (pen.)	Stadium: Hüseyin Avni Aker Stadium; Referee: Bülent Yavuz

16 October 1993 8	Galatasaray	5 – 4	Kocaelispor	Istanbul
18:00 CET	Kubilay 26'; Tugay 61', 78'; Götz 81'; Hakan 85'	Report	Melih 64'; Tuncay 66'; Ümit 75'; Saffet 88'	Stadium: Ali Sami Yen Stadium; Attendance: 21,719; Referee: Sadık Deda

13 November 1993 9	Beşiktaş	0 – 1	Galatasaray	Istanbul
18:00 CET		Report	Tugay 8' (pen.)	Stadium: İnönü Stadium; Attendance: 9,951; Referee: Bülent Yavuz

20 November 1993 10	Altay	0 – 2	Galatasaray	İzmir
18:00 CET		Report	Götz 47'; Suat 73'	Stadium: İzmir Atatürk Stadium; Attendance: 19,482; Referee: Hamza Işın

28 November 1993 11	Galatasaray	4 – 1	Gençlerbirliği	Istanbul
18:00 CET	Hakan 10', 33', 66', 88'	Report	Moshoeu 49'	Stadium: Ali Sami Yen Stadium; Attendance: 11,770; Referee: İbrahim Aksoy

1 December 1993 12	Gaziantepspor	3 – 4	Galatasaray	Gaziantep
11:00 CET	Monteiro 2'; Bolic 30' (pen.)	Report	Suat 4', 78'; Arif 11'; Hakan 32'	Stadium: Kamil Ocak Stadium; Referee: İbrahim Aksoy

4 December 1993 13	Kayserispor	1 – 2	Galatasaray	Kayseri
11:00 CET	Salih 44'	Report	Hayrettin 16' (o.g.); Bülent 86'	Stadium: Kayseri Atatürk Stadium; Referee: Serdar Çakman

12 December 1993 14	Galatasaray	2 – 0	Sarıyer	Istanbul
17:00 CET	Suat 16'; Tugay 30'	Report		Stadium: Ali Sami Yen Stadium; Referee: Serdar Çakır

18 December 1993 15	Bursaspor	2 – 1	Galatasaray	Bursa
18:00 CET	Vedat 17'; Tunahan 39'	Report	Suat 16'	Stadium: Bursa Atatürk Stadium; Referee: Serdar Çakır

6 February 1994 16	Zeytinburnuspor	0 – 2	Galatasaray	Istanbul
17:00 CET		Report	Arif 80', 90'	Stadium: İnönü Stadium; Attendance: 15,093; Referee: Sabri Çelik

13 February 1994 17	Galatasaray	6 – 1	Samsunspor	Istanbul
18:00 CET	Tugay 45' (pen.), pen.' Erdal 46', 75'; Suat 58'; Götz 78'	Report	Ertuğrul 12' (pen.)	Stadium: Ali Sami Yen Stadium; Attendance: 3,984; Referee: Hasan Ceylan

20 February 1994 18	Karşıyaka	0 – 3	Galatasaray	İzmir
11:00 CET	Arif 53', 77'; Hakan 55'	Report		Stadium: İzmir Atatürk Stadium; Attendance: 12,663; Referee: Serdar Çakman

26 February 1994 19	Galatasaray	3 – 0	Ankaragücü	Istanbul
18:00 CET	Mert 42'; Götz 65'; Hakan 90' (pen.)	Report		Stadium: Ali Sami Yen Stadium; Attendance: 11,350; Referee: Engin Kurt

6 March 1994 20	Karabükspor	0 – 0	Galatasaray	Karabük
11:00 CET		Report		Stadium: Karabük Yenişehir Stadium; Referee: Vahap Beyaz

12 March 1994 21	Galatasaray	2 – 1	Fenerbahçe	Istanbul
18:00 CET	Tugay 30'; Hakan 87'	Report	Kemalettin 30'	Stadium: Ali Sami Yen Stadium; Attendance: 27,003; Referee: Ahmet Çakar

20 March 1994 22	Galatasaray	0 – 2	Trabzonspor	Istanbul
17:00 CET		Report	Shota 64'; Orhan 88'	Stadium: Ali Sami Yen Stadium; Attendance: 20,604; Referee: Metin Tokat

26 March 1994 23	Kocaelispor	1 – 3	Galatasaray	İzmit
11:00 CET	Mirkovic 72'	Report	Arif 62'; Tugay 64'; Kubilay 89'	Stadium: İsmet Paşa Stadium; Referee: Serdar Çakman

3 April 1994 24	Galatasaray	3 – 1	Gaziantepspor	Istanbul
17:00 CET	Arif 8'; Hakan 30'; Hamza 83'	Report	Moloi 76'	Stadium: Ali Sami Yen Stadium; Attendance: 25,494; Referee: Hamza Işın

9 April 1994 25	Galatasaray	1 – 1	Beşiktaş	Istanbul
18:00 CET	Hamza 33'	Report	Metin 72'	Stadium: Ali Sami Yen Stadium; Attendance: 14,468; Referee: Ahmet Çakar

16 April 1994 26	Galatasaray	3 – 1	Altay S.K.	Istanbul
11:00 CET	Arif 12'; Tugay 18'; Hamza 74'	Report	Gusev 73'	Stadium: Ali Sami Yen Stadium; Attendance: 12,500; Referee: Metin Tokat

24 April 1994 27	Gençlerbirliği	2 – 1	Galatasaray	Ankara
11:00 CET	Erkan 8'; Kona 58'	Report	Ljung 62'	Stadium: Ankara 19 Mayıs Stadium; Attendance: 19,363; Referee: Oğuz Sarvan

30 April 1994 28	Galatasaray	3 – 1	Kayserispor	Istanbul
18:00 CET	Uğur 36', 55'; Soner 80'	Report	Zafer 3'	Stadium: Ali Sami Yen Stadium; Attendance: 26,165; Referee: Hasan Ceylan

8 May 1994 29	Sarıyer	0 – 2	Galatasaray	Istanbul
14:30 CET		Report	Tugay 12' (pen.); Suat 85'	Stadium: İnönü Stadium; Attendance: 34,500; Referee: Metin Tokat

15 May 1994 30	Galatasaray	2 – 0	Bursaspor	Istanbul
14:30 CET	Hakan 5'; Ljung 50'	Report		Stadium: Ali Sami Yen Stadium; Attendance: 31,998; Referee: Serdar Çakman

== Türkiye Kupası ==
Kick-off listed in local time (EET)

=== 6th round ===
22 December 1993 1	Denizlispor	0–1	Galatasaray SK	Denizli
12:30 EET		(Report)	Mustafa Kocabey 35'	Stadium: Atatürk Stadı; Referee: Turgut Sığıç

=== 1/4 final ===
30 January 1994 1	Kayserispor	2–3	Galatasaray SK	Kayseri
12:00 EET	Levent Devrim 3'; Nedzat Sabani 64'	(Report)	Arif Erdem 67', 82'; Mustafa Kocabey 75'	Stadium: Kayseri Atatürk Stadı; Referee: Bülent Yavuz

=== 1/2 final ===
9 February 1994 1	Kocaelispor	2–1	Galatasaray SK	Izmit
12:00 EET	Osman Çakır 52'; Arif Bacacı 90'	(Report)	Falko Götz 72p'	Stadium: İsmet Paşa Stadı; Referee: Metin Tokat

9 March 1994 2	Galatasaray SK	2–0	Kocaelispor	Istanbul
19:30 EET	Hakan Şükür 52p', 77'	(Report)		Stadium: Ali Sami Yen Stadı; Attendance: 10,702; Referee: Ünsal Çimen

=== Final ===
6 April 1994 1	Galatasaray SK	0–0	Beşiktaş JK	Istanbul
19:00 EET		(Report)		Stadium: Ali Sami Yen Stadı; Attendance: 12,869; Referee: Bülent Yavuz

4 May 1994 2	Beşiktaş JK	3–2	Galatasaray SK	Istanbul
18:00 EET	Metin Tekin 15'; Fani Madida 22'; Alpay Özalan 83'	(Report)	Hakan Şükür 11'; Bülent Korkmaz 78'	Stadium: İnönü Stadı; Attendance: 23,400; Referee: Ahmet Çakar

== UEFA Champions League ==
=== 1st round ===
15 September 1993 1	Galatasaray SK	2–1	Cork City F.C.	Istanbul
20:30 TRT	Türkyılmaz 30'; Erdem 51'	(Report)	Barry 67'	Stadium: Ali Sami Yen Stadium; Attendance: 17,304; Referee: (Spain) José María García-Aranda

29 September 1993 2	Cork City F.C.	0–1	Galatasaray SK	Cork
17:00 CET		(Report)	Türkyılmaz 76'	Stadium: Turners Cross; Attendance: 4,100; Referee: (France) Didier Pauchard

=== 2nd round ===
20 October 1993 1	Manchester United FC	3–3	Galatasaray SK	Manchester
20:05 UTC	Pallister 3'; Şükür 13og' Cantona 81'	(Report)	Erdem 16'; Türkyilmaz 31', 63'	Stadium: Old Trafford; Attendance: 39,396; Referee: (Denmark) Peter Mikkelsen

3 November 1993 2	Galatasaray SK	0–0	Manchester United FC	Istanbul
19:30 TRT		(Report)		Stadium: Ali Sami Yen Stadium; Attendance: 26,188; Referee: (Austria) Kurt Röthlisberger

=== Group stage ===
Pos	Team	Pld	W	D	L	GF	GA	GD	Pts	Qualification	BAR	MON	SPM	GAL
1	(Spain) Barcelona	6	4	2	0	13	3	+10	10	Advance to knockout stage	—	2–0	5–1	3–0
2	(France) Monaco	6	3	1	2	9	4	+5	7	Advance to knockout stage	0–1	—	4–1	3–0
3	(Russia) Spartak Moscow	6	1	3	2	6	12	−6	5		2–2	0–0	—	0–0
4	(Turkey) Galatasaray	6	0	2	4	1	10	−9	2		0–0	0–2	1–2	—

Source: UEFA

24 November 1993 1	Galatasaray SK	0–0	FC Barcelona	Istanbul
21:30		(Report)		Stadium: Ali Sami Yen Stadı; Attendance: 30,000; Referee: (Belgium) Frans van den Wijngaert

8 December 1993 2	FC Spartak Moscow	0–0	Galatasaray SK	Moscow
20:00		(Report)		Stadium: Luzhniki Stadium; Attendance: 45,000; Referee: (Belgium) John Blankenstein

2 March 1994 3	AS Monaco	3–0	Galatasaray SK	Monaco
20:30	Scifo 36'; Djorkaeff 41'; Klinsmann 55'	(Report)		Stadium: Stade Louis II; Attendance: 18,000; Referee: (Germany) Hellmut Krug

16 March 1994 4	Galatasaray SK	0–2	AS Monaco	Istanbul
20:30		(Report)	Scifo 54'; Gnako 88'	Stadium: Ali Sami Yen Stadı; Attendance: 30,000; Referee: (Sweden) Leif Sundell

30 March 1994 5	FC Barcelona	3–0	Galatasaray SK	Barcelona
20:00	Guillermo 21'; Koeman 70p' Eusebio 77'	(Report)		Stadium: Camp Nou; Attendance: 85,000; Referee: (Scotland) Les Mottram

13 April 1994 4	Galatasaray SK	1–2	FC Spartak Moscow	Istanbul
21:30	Arslan 86'	(Report)	Onopko 55'; Karpin 83'	Stadium: Ali Sami Yen Stadı; Attendance: 22,000; Referee: (Austria) Gerd Grabher

== Süper Kupa-Cumhurbaşkanlığı Kupası ==
Kick-off listed in local time (EET)

=== 1993 ===
14 August 1993 1993 Final	Galatasaray SK	2–0	Beşiktaş JK	Ankara
17:00 EET	Mustafa Kocabey 1'; Hakan Şükür 64'	(Report)		Stadium: 19 Mayıs Stadı; Attendance: 18,836; Referee: Erman Toroğlu

=== 1994 ===
22 May 1994 1994 Final	Galatasaray SK	1–3	Beşiktaş JK	Ankara
20:00 EET	Suat Kaya 2'	(Report)	Feyyaz Uçar 17'; Metin Tekin 66'; Sergen Yalçın 69'	Stadium: 19 Mayıs Stadı; Referee: Bülent Yavuz

== Friendly Matches ==
Kick-off listed in local time (EET)

=== TSYD Kupası ===
18 August 1993 1	Beşiktaş JK	4–1	Galatasaray SK	Istanbul
18:00 EET	Feyyaz Uçar 37'; Mert Korkmaz 42og' Sergen Yalçın 50', 70'	(Report)	Kubilay Türkyılmaz 58'	Stadium: Ali Sami Yen Stadı; Attendance: 16,896; Referee: Halil Taner Yalçındağ

21 August 1993 2	Galatasaray SK	2–2	Fenerbahçe SK	Istanbul
17:30 EET	Kubilay Türkyılmaz 35'; Hakan Şükür 45'	(Report)	Oğuz Çetin 12'; Hakan Tecimer 71'	Stadium: Fenerbahçe Stadı; Attendance: 18,565; Referee: Sabri Çelik

== Attendance ==
Competition	Av. Att.	Total Att.
1. Lig	17,743	248,395
Türkiye Kupası	11,786	23,571
Champions League	25,932	129,660
Total	19,125	401,626
