= 1993–94 AC Milan season =

Associazione Calcio Milan
1993–94 season
- President: Silvio Berlusconi
- Manager: Fabio Capello
- Stadium: San Siro
- Serie A: 1st
- Supercoppa Italiana: Winners
- Coppa Italia: Round of 16
- UEFA Champions League: Winners
- European Super Cup: Runners-up
- Intercontinental Cup: Runners-up
- Top goalscorer: League: Daniele Massaro (11); All: Daniele Massaro (15)
- Average home league attendance: 65,708
Home colours	Away colours

Associazione Calcio Milan enjoyed perhaps the greatest season in its history, winning three trophies, most memorable for the 4–0 victory against FC Barcelona in the Champions League Final in Athens. That game saw a goal explosion from a Milan side that had been extremely defensive during the entire league season. Milan won Serie A for a third consecutive time with a mere 36 goals scored in 34 games, but conceding only 15, which was largely down to their strong defensive line, with Franco Baresi and Paolo Maldini as key players to thank for their third consecutive domestic success. Milan's match against struggling Reggiana at San Siro on 1 May 1994 came on a day when the sporting world was overshadowed with the death of Formula One racing driver Ayrton Senna in the 1994 San Marino Grand Prix, but the football world was focused on AC Milan's attempts to seal a 13th title. It was a narrow 1–0 defeat by Reggiana, with a goal from Massimiliano Esposito, but mathematically enough to seal the Scudetto by league trophy handover ceremony. This team is widely regarded as one of the best teams of all time.

This season was the first not to feature any contributions from the famous Dutch trio of Marco van Basten, Ruud Gullit, and Frank Rijkaard. While the former was unable to play all throughout the season due to ankle injury treatment, the latter two transferred out of the club during pre-season.

== Overview ==
Competition	Record								Result	Top scorer
Competition	G	W	D	L	GF	GA	GD	Win %	Result	Top scorer
Serie A	34	19	12	3	36	15	+21	55.88	Winners	(Italy) Daniele Massaro, 11
Coppa Italia	4	1	2	1	5	3	+2	25.00	3rd round	5 players, 1
Supercoppa Italiana	1	1	0	0	1	0	+1	100.00	Winners	(Italy) Marco Simone, 1
UEFA Champions League	12	7	5	0	21	2	+19	58.33	Winners	(Italy) Daniele Massaro, 4 (France) Jean-Pierre Papin, 4
European Super Cup	2	1	0	1	1	2	−1	50.00	Runners-up	(France) Jean-Pierre Papin, 1
Intercontinental Cup	1	0	0	1	2	3	−1	0.00	Runners-up	(Italy) Daniele Massaro, 1 (France) Jean-Pierre Papin, 1
Total	54	29	19	6	66	25	+41	53.70		(Italy) Daniele Massaro, 16

== Players ==
Note: Flags indicate national team as defined under FIFA eligibility rules; some limited exceptions apply. Players may hold more than one non-FIFA nationality.

Pos.	Nation	Player
GK	ITA	Sebastiano Rossi
GK	ITA	Francesco Antonioli
GK	ITA	Mario Ielpo
DF	ITA	Mauro Tassotti
DF	ITA	Christian Panucci
DF	ITA	Franco Baresi
DF	ITA	Alessandro Costacurta
DF	ITA	Filippo Galli
DF	ITA	Stefano Nava
DF	ITA	Paolo Maldini
DF	ITA	Alessandro Orlando
MF	ITA	Roberto Donadoni
MF	ITA	Stefano Eranio

Pos.	Nation	Player
MF	ITA	Demetrio Albertini
MF	FRA	Marcel Desailly
MF	ITA	Fernando De Napoli
MF	CRO	Zvonimir Boban
MF	DEN	Brian Laudrup
MF	ITA	Angelo Carbone
MF	ITA	Gianluigi Lentini
FW	YUG	Dejan Savićević
FW	FRA	Jean-Pierre Papin
FW	ITA	Daniele Massaro
FW	ITA	Marco Simone
FW	ROU	Florin Răducioiu
FW	NED	Marco van Basten

=== Transfers ===
In
Pos.	Name	from	Type
DF	Christian Panucci	Genoa CFC	
FW	Florin Răducioiu	Brescia Calcio	
GK	Mario Ielpo	Cagliari Calcio	
DF	Alessandro Orlando	Udinese Calcio	
DF	Rufo Emiliano Verga	Fiorentina	
FW	Brian Laudrup	Fiorentina	loan
DF	Roberto Lorenzini	Ancona	loan ended
MF	Angelo Carbone	SSC Napoli	loan ended
FW	Massimiliano Cappellini	Como	loan ended
FW	Giovane Élber	Grasshoppers	loan ended

Out
Pos.	Name	To	Type
MF	Ruud Gullit	Sampdoria	loan
MF	Frank Rijkaard	AFC Ajax	end of contract
MF	Alberigo Evani	Sampdoria	
FW	Massimiliano Cappellini	Foggia	
GK	Carlo Cudicini	Como	loan
DF	Enzo Gambaro	SSC Napoli	loan
DF	Roberto Lorenzini	Genoa CFC	co-ownership
FW	Giovane Élber	Grasshoppers	loan
FW	Aldo Serena	-	retired

==== Winter ====
In
Pos.	Name	from	Type
DF	Marcel Desailly	Olympique de Marseille	

Out
Pos.	Name	To	Type
GK	Francesco Antonioli	Pisa	
DF	Rufo Emiliano Verga	Lecce	

== Competitions ==
=== Serie A ===
==== League table ====
Pos	Team	Pld	W	D	L	GF	GA	GD	Pts	Qualification or relegation
1	Milan (C)	34	19	12	3	36	15	+21	50	Qualified to Champions League
2	Juventus	34	17	13	4	58	25	+33	47	Qualification to UEFA Cup
3	Lazio	34	17	10	7	55	40	+15	44	Qualification to UEFA Cup
4	Sampdoria	34	18	8	8	64	39	+25	44	Qualification to Cup Winners' Cup
5	Parma	34	17	7	10	50	35	+15	41	Qualification to UEFA Cup

Source: 1993–94 Serie A, RSSSF.com, Soccerway
Rules for classification: 1) Points; 2) Head-to-head points; 3) Head-to-head goal difference; 4) Goal difference; 5) Goals scored; 6) Draw. (Note: Head-to-head record is used only after all the matches between the teams in question have been played).
(C) Champions

==== Results summary ====
Overall								Home						Away					
Pld	W	D	L	GF	GA	GD	Pts	W	D	L	GF	GA	GD	W	D	L	GF	GA	GD
34	19	12	3	36	15	+21	69	11	5	1	22	9	+13	8	7	2	14	6	+8

Source: Competitive matches

==== Results by round ====
Round	1	2	3	4	5	6	7	8	9	10	11	12	13	14	15	16	17	18	19	20	21	22	23	24	25	26	27	28	29	30	31	32	33	34	35
Ground	A	H	A	H	H	A	H	A	H	A	A	H	A	H	A	H	A	A	H	A	H	A	A	H	A	H	A	H	H	A	H	A	H	A	H
Result	W	W	D	W	W	W	D	D	D	L	W	W	D	W	-	W	W	D	D	D	W	W	W	W	W	W	W	W	W	L	D	D	D	D	L
Position	7	3	3	2	1	1	1	1	2	4	2	2	3	1	2	1	1	1	1	1	1	1	1	1	1	1	1	1	1	1	1	1	1	1	1

Source: Competitive matches
A = Away; H = Home; W = Win; D = Draw; L = Loss; = 1993–94 UEFA Champions League; = 1993–94 UEFA Cup

==== Matches ====
29 August 1993 1	Lecce	0–1	Milan	Lecce
		Report	Boban 51'	Stadium: Via del Mare; Attendance: 34 418; Referee: Luci

5 September 1993 2	Milan	1–0	Genoa	Naples
	Massaro 40'	Report		Stadium: Stadio San Paolo; Attendance: 64 466; Referee: Collina

8 September 1993 3	Piacenza	0–0	Milan	Piacenza
		Report		Stadium: Stadio Galleana; Attendance: 20 673; Referee: Cinciripini

12 September 1993 4	Milan	2–0	Atalanta	Milan
	Papin 23'; Răducioiu 52'	Report		Stadium: San Siro; Attendance: 65 838; Referee: Trentalange

19 September 1993 5	Milan	2–0	Roma	Milan
	Papin 45'; Nava 70'	Report		Stadium: San Siro; Attendance: 63 131; Referee: Ceccarini

26 September 1993 6	Cremonese	0–2	Milan	Cremona
		Report	Papin 9'; Simone 20'	Stadium: Stadio Giovanni Zini; Attendance: 15 714; Referee: Pairetto

3 October 1993 7	Milan	0–0	Lazio	Milan
		Report		Stadium: San Siro; Attendance: 63 279; Referee: Nicchi

17 October 1993 8	Foggia	1–1	Milan	Foggia
	Kolyvanov 60'	Report	Boban 80'	Stadium: Stadio Pino Zaccheria; Attendance: 19 284; Referee: Beschin

24 October 1993 9	Milan	1–1	Juventus	Milan
	Albertini 75'	Report	R. Baggio 60' (pen.)	Stadium: San Siro; Attendance: 80 290; Referee: Luci

31 October 1993 10	Sampdoria	3–2	Milan	Genoa
	Katanec 56'; Mancini 71' (pen.); Gullit 78'	Report	Albertini 11'; B. Laudrup 25'	Stadium: Stadio Luigi Ferraris; Attendance: 38 954; Referee: Nicchi

7 November 1993 11	Inter	1–2	Milan	Milan
	Bergkamp 64' (pen.)	Report	Panucci 34'; Papin 52'	Stadium: San Siro; Attendance: 79 705; Referee: Baldas

21 November 1993 12	Milan	2–1	Napoli	Milan
	Panucci 61'; Albertini 90'	Report	Pecchia 45'	Stadium: San Siro; Attendance: 63 193; Referee: Bazzoli

28 November 1993 13	Parma	0–0	Milan	Parma
		Report		Stadium: Stadio Ennio Tardini; Attendance: 28 803; Referee: Ceccarini

5 December 1993 14	Milan	1–0	Torino	Milan
	Răducioiu 27'	Report		Stadium: San Siro; Attendance: 65 848; Referee: Stafoggia

19 December 1993 16	Milan	2–1	Cagliari	Milan
	Massaro 32', 34'	Report	M. Villa 37'	Stadium: San Siro; Attendance: 60 785; Referee: Amendolia

2 January 1994 17	Reggiana	0–1	Milan	Reggio Emilia
		Report	Desailly 28'	Stadium: Stadio Mirabello; Attendance: 14 577; Referee: Rosica

6 January 1994 15	Udinese	0–0	Milan	Udine
		Report		Stadium: Friuli; Attendance: 22 760; Referee: Cinciripini
Note: Match rescheduled from 12 December 1993 due to Milan participation on 1993 Intercontinental Cup at Tokyo, Japan.

9 January 1994 18	Milan	0–0	Lecce	Milan
		Report		Stadium: San Siro; Attendance: 59 263; Referee: Pellegrino

16 January 1994 19	Genoa	0–0	Milan	Genoa
		Report		Stadium: Stadio Luigi Ferraris; Attendance: 30 291; Referee: Bazzoli

23 January 1994 20	Milan	2–0	Piacenza	Milan
	Massaro 72'; Papin 76'	Report		Stadium: San Siro; Attendance: 62 538; Referee: Rodomonti

30 January 1994 21	Atalanta	0–1	Milan	Bergamo
		Report	Massaro 55'	Stadium: Stadio Comunale; Attendance: 29 215; Referee: Baldas

6 February 1994 22	Roma	0–2	Milan	Rome
		Report	Massaro 11'; Maldini 77'	Stadium: Stadio Olimpico; Attendance: 53 565; Referee: Amendolia

13 February 1994 23	Milan	1–0	Cremonese	Milan
	Simone 63'	Report		Stadium: San Siro; Attendance: 61 088; Referee: Quartuccio

20 February 1994 24	Lazio	0–1	Milan	Rome
		Report	Massaro 45'	Stadium: Stadio Olimpico; Attendance: 70 854; Referee: Beschin

27 February 1994 25	Milan	2–1	Foggia	Milan
	Boban 45'; Massaro 54'	Report	Kolyvanov 66'	Stadium: San Siro; Attendance: 65 485

6 March 1994 26	Juventus	0–1	Milan	Turin
		Report	Eranio 60'	Stadium: delle Alpi; Attendance: 57 844; Referee: Collina

13 March 1994 27	Milan	1–0	Sampdoria	Milan
	Massaro 25'	Report		Stadium: San Siro; Attendance: 79 126; Referee: Stafoggia

20 March 1994 28	Milan	2–1	Inter	Milan
	Bergomi 46' (o.g.); Massaro 89'	Report	Schillaci 86'	Stadium: San Siro; Attendance: 76 348; Referee: Ceccarini

27 March 1994 29	Napoli	1–0	Milan	Naples
	Di Canio 79'	Report		Stadium: Stadio San Paolo; Attendance: 56 777; Referee: Rodomonti

2 April 1994 30	Milan	1–1	Parma	Milan
	Massaro 73'	Report	Zola 84' (pen.)	Stadium: San Siro; Attendance: 67 270; Referee: Boggi

10 April 1994 31	Torino	0–0	Milan	Turin
		Report		Stadium: Stadio delle Alpi; Attendance: 32 348; Referee: Cesari

17 April 1994 32	Milan	2–2	Udinese	Milan
	Boban 60'; Simone 70'	Report	Borgonovo 69'; Rossitto 71'	Stadium: San Siro; Attendance: 72 003; Referee: Luci

24 April 1994 33	Cagliari	0–0	Milan	Cagliari
		Report		Stadium: Stadio Sant'Elia; Attendance: 23 651; Referee: Collina

1 May 1994 34	Milan	0–1	Reggiana	Milan
		Report	Esposito 71'	Stadium: San Siro; Attendance: 70 404; Referee: Cesari

=== Coppa Italia ===
==== Second round ====
6 October 1993 1	Milan	3–0	Vicenza	San Siro, Milan
20:30	Carbone 2'; Răducioiu 42'; Eranio 71'			Referee: Stefano Braschi

27 October 1993 2	Vicenza	1–1 (1–3 agg.)	Milan	Stadio Romeo Menti, Vicenza
20:30	Civeriati 71'		Savićević 53'	Referee: Daniele Tombolini

==== Third round ====
10 November 1993 1	Milan	1–1	Piacenza	San Siro, Milan
20:30	Orlando 25'		Maccoppi 84'	Referee: Roberto Bettin

15 December 1993 2	Piacenza	1–0 (2–1 agg.)	Milan	Galleana, Piacenza
20:30	Piovani 90'			Referee: Pierluigi Collina

=== Supercoppa Italiana ===
21 August 1993	Milan	1–0	Torino	RFK, Washington, D.C.
14:45	Simone 4'	Report		Attendance: 25,268; Referee: Helder Dias

=== UEFA Champions League ===
==== First round ====
15 September 1993 First Leg	FC Aarau (Switzerland)	0–1	(Italy) Milan	Hardturm, Zurich
20:30		Report	Papin 54'	Attendance: 9,400; Referee: Alan Snoddy (Northern Ireland)

29 September 1993 Second Leg	Milan (Italy)	0–0 (1–0 agg.)	(Switzerland) FC Aarau	San Siro, Milan
20:30		Report		Attendance: 40,000; Referee: Marc Batta (France)

==== Second round ====
20 October 1993 First Leg	Copenhagen (Denmark)	0–6	(Italy) Milan	Parken Stadium, Copenhagen
20:15		Report	Papin 1', 72'; Simone 6', 16'; Laudrup 44'; Orlando 61'	Attendance: 34,285; Referee: Guy Goethals (Belgium)

3 November 1993 Second Leg	Milan (Italy)	1–0 (7–0 agg.)	(Denmark) Copenhagen	San Siro, Milan
20:30	Papin 45'	Report		Attendance: 10,000; Referee: Sándor Puhl (Hungary)

==== Group stage ====
Pos	Team	Pld	W	D	L	GF	GA	GD	Pts	Qualification	MIL	POR	BRM	AND
1	(Italy) Milan	6	2	4	0	6	2	+4	8	Advance to knockout stage	—	3–0	2–1	0–0
2	(Portugal) Porto	6	3	1	2	10	6	+4	7	Advance to knockout stage	0–0	—	3–2	2–0
3	(Germany) Werder Bremen	6	2	1	3	11	15	−4	5		1–1	0–5	—	5–3
4	(Belgium) Anderlecht	6	1	2	3	5	9	−4	4		0–0	1–0	1–2	—

Source: UEFA

24 November 1993 1	Anderlecht (Belgium)	0–0	(Italy) Milan	Constant Vanden Stock Stadium, Anderlecht
20:30		Report MatchCentre		Attendance: 28,000; Referee: Vadim Zhuk (Belarus)

1 December 1993 2	Milan (Italy)	3–0	(Portugal) Porto	San Siro, Milan
20:30	Răducioiu 18'; Panucci 40'; Massaro 64'	Report		Attendance: 31,915; Referee: Leif Sundell (Sweden)

2 March 1994 3	Milan (Italy)	2–1	(Germany) Werder Bremen	San Siro, Milan
20:30	Maldini 48'; Savićević 68'	Report	Basler 54'	Attendance: 41,239; Referee: Leslie Mottram (Scotland)

16 March 1994 4	Werder Bremen (Germany)	1–1	(Italy) Milan	Weserstadion, Bremen
20:30	Rufer 52' (pen.)	Report	Savićević 74'	Attendance: 31,000; Referee: Kim Milton Nielsen (Denmark)

30 March 1994 5	Milan (Italy)	0–0	(Belgium) Anderlecht	San Siro, Milan
20:30		Report		Attendance: 39,576; Referee: Joël Quiniou (France)

13 April 1994 6	Porto (Portugal)	0–0	(Italy) Milan	Estádio das Antas, Porto
19:30		Report		Attendance: 50,000; Referee: Sándor Puhl (Hungary)

==== Semi-final ====
27 April 1994	Milan (Italy)	3–0	(France) AS Monaco	San Siro, Milan
20:30	Desailly 14'; Albertini 48'; Massaro 66'	Report		Attendance: 78,650; Referee: Bernd Heynemann (Germany)

=== Final ===
18 May 1994	Milan (Italy)	4–0	(Spain) Barcelona	Olympic Stadium, Athens
21:15	Massaro 22', 45+2'; Savićević 47'; Desailly 58'	Report		Attendance: 70,000; Referee: Philip Don (England)

=== Intercontinental Cup ===
12 December 1993	Milan (Italy)	2–3	(Brazil) São Paulo	National Stadium, Tokyo
12:00	Massaro 48'; Papin 81'	Report	Palhinha 19'; Cerezo 59'; Müller 88'	Attendance: 52,275; Referee: Joël Quiniou (France)

=== European Super Cup ===
12 January 1994 First Leg	Parma (Italy)	0–1	(Italy) Milan	Ennio Tardini, Parma
20:30			Papin 44'	Attendance: 8,083; Referee: Manuel Díaz Vega (Spain)

2 February 1994 Second Leg	Milan (Italy)	0–2 (a.e.t.) (1–2 agg.)	(Italy) Parma	San Siro, Milan
20:30			Sensini 23'; Crippa 95'	Attendance: 24,074; Referee: Kurt Röthlisberger (Switzerland)

== Statistics ==
=== Players statistics ===
No.	Pos	Nat	Player	Total		Serie A		Champions League		Coppa	
No.	Pos	Nat	Player	Apps	Goals	Apps	Goals	Apps	Goals	Apps	Goals
	GK	(Italy) ITA	Rossi	42	-13	31	-11	11	-2	0	0
	DF	(Italy) ITA	Tassotti	31	0	18+3	0	8+1	0	1	0
	DF	(Italy) ITA	Costacurta	43	0	30	0	11	0	2	0
	DF	(Italy) ITA	Baresi	40	0	31	0	9	0	0	0
	DF	(Italy) ITA	Maldini	42	2	30	1	10	1	2	0
	MF	(Italy) ITA	Donadoni	43	0	23+9	0	8	0	3	0
	MF	(Italy) ITA	Albertini	37	4	25+1	3	8+3	1	0	0
	MF	(France) FRA	Desailly	28	3	21	1	6	2	1	0
	MF	(Croatia) CRO	Boban	29	4	20	4	8	0	1	0
	FW	(Federal Republic of Yugoslavia) YUG	Savicevic	30	4	20	0	7	3	3	1
	FW	(Italy) ITA	Massaro	43	15	17+12	11	8+3	4	3	0
	GK	(Italy) ITA	Ielpo	8	-7	3	-4	1	0	4	-3
	MF	(Italy) ITA	Eranio	26	2	20+1	1	3	0	2	1
	FW	(France) FRA	Papin	26	9	18	5	6	4	2	0
	FW	(Italy) ITA	Simone	33	5	16+9	3	3+4	2	1	0
	DF	(Italy) ITA	Panucci	29	3	16+3	2	6+1	1	3	0
	MF	(Denmark) DEN	Laudrup	17	2	8+1	1	6	1	2	0
	DF	(Italy) ITA	Orlando	21	2	7+6	0	5	1	3	1
	DF	(Italy) ITA	Galli	18	0	5+3	0	3+3	0	4	0
	FW	(Romania) ROU	Raducioiu	12	4	5+2	2	2	1	3	1
	MF	(Italy) ITA	Carbone	13	0	3+6	0	1+3	0	0	0
	MF	(Italy) ITA	Lentini	9	0	3+4	0	0+1	0	1	0
	MF	(Italy) ITA	De Napoli	10	0	1+4	0	2	0	3	0
	DF	(Italy) ITA	Nava	5	0	0	0	0+2	0	3	0
	GK	(Italy) ITA	Antonioli	0	0	0	0	0	0	0	0
	DF	(Italy) ITA	Sadotti	0	0	0	0	0	0	0	0
	DF	(Italy) ITA	Verga	0	0	0	0	0	0	0	0
	MF	(Italy) ITA	Cozza	0	0	0	0	0	0	0	0
	FW	(Netherlands) NED	Van Basten	0	0	0	0	0	0	0	0

- Source: https://www.bdfutbol.com/en/t/t1993-943015.html

== See also ==
- 1993–94 Serie A

== Sources ==
- RSSSF - Italy 1993/94
