= 1993–94 UEFA Champions League preliminary round =

European football tournament

The 1993–94 UEFA Champions League preliminary round was the qualifying round for the 1993–94 UEFA Champions League, and featured 20 teams. It began on 18 August with the first legs and ended on 1 September 1993 with the second legs. The ten winners advanced to the first round, joining 22 other teams.

Times are CEST (UTC+2), as listed by UEFA.

== Format ==
Each tie was played over two legs, with each team playing one leg at home. The team that scored more goals on aggregate over the two legs advanced to the next round. If the aggregate score was level, the away goals rule was applied, i.e. the team that scored more goals away from home over the two legs advanced. If away goals were also equal, then extra time was played. The away goals rule would be again applied after extra time, i.e. if there were goals scored during extra time and the aggregate score was still level, the visiting team advanced by virtue of more away goals scored. If no goals were scored during extra time, the tie was decided by penalty shoot-out.

== Teams and draw ==
The twenty-lowest teams in the 1993 UEFA seeding coefficient ranking entered into the preliminary round. The draw for the preliminary round was held on 14 July 1993 in Geneva, Switzerland. It is unclear whether any seeding was used.

Key to colours
Winners of preliminary round advanced to first round

Preliminary round participants
Team	Coeff.
(Norway) Rosenborg	0.971
(Switzerland) Aarau	0.939
(Finland) HJK	0.855
(Northern Ireland) Linfield	0.833
Croatia Zagreb	0.750
(Iceland) ÍA	0.656
(Albania) Partizani	0.634
(Luxembourg) Avenir Beggen	0.633
(Cyprus) Omonia	0.623
(Wales) Cwmbrân Town	0.571
(Malta) Floriana	0.563
(Republic of Ireland) Cork City	0.500
(Latvia) Skonto	0.500
(Faroe Islands) B68	0.000
(Israel) Beitar Jerusalem	0.000
(Georgia (country)) Dinamo Tbilisi	0.000
(Lithuania) Ekranas	0.000
(Estonia) Norma Tallinn	0.000
(Slovenia) Olimpija Ljubljana	0.000
(Moldova) Zimbru Chișinău	0.000

== Summary ==
The first legs were played on 18 and 22 August, and the second legs on 1 September 1993.

Team 1	Agg.	Team 2	1st leg	2nd leg
HJK (Finland)	2–1	(Estonia) Norma Tallinn	1–1	1–0
Ekranas (Lithuania)	0–2	(Malta) Floriana	0–1	0–1
B68 (Faroe Islands)	0–11	Croatia Zagreb	0–5	0–6
Skonto (Latvia)	1–1 (11–10 p)	(Slovenia) Olimpija Ljubljana	0–1	1–0 (a.e.t.)
Cwmbrân Town (Wales)	4–4 (a)	(Republic of Ireland) Cork City	3–2	1–2
Dinamo Tbilisi (Georgia (country))	w/o (Note: Linfield were awarded a walkover victory after Dinamo Tbilisi were banned for an attempt to bribe the referee in the first leg.)	(Northern Ireland) Linfield	2–1	1–1
Avenir Beggen (Luxembourg)	0–3	(Norway) Rosenborg	0–2	0–1
Partizani (Albania)	0–3	(Iceland) ÍA	0–0	0–3
Omonia (Cyprus)	2–3	(Switzerland) Aarau	2–1	0–2
Zimbru Chișinău (Moldova)	1–3	(Israel) Beitar Jerusalem	1–1	0–2

== Matches ==
18 August 1993
17:00

HJK (Finland)	1–1	(Estonia) Norma Tallinn
Heinola 16'	Report	Borissov 17'

Helsingin olympiastadion, Helsinki
Attendance: 1,852
Referee: Finn Lambek (Denmark)
1 September 1993
16:30

Norma Tallinn (Estonia)	0–1	(Finland) HJK
	Report	Ylä-Jussila 81'

Rannavärava, Tallinn
Attendance: 2,500
Referee: Wojciech Rudy (Poland)

HJK won 2–1 on aggregate.

18 August 1993
17:00

Ekranas (Lithuania)	0–1	(Malta) Floriana
	Report	Buttigieg 42'

Aukštaitijos stadionas, Panevėžys
Attendance: 7,300
Referee: Ilkka Koho (Finland)
1 September 1993
17:00

Floriana (Malta)	1–0	(Lithuania) Ekranas
Buttigieg 51'	Report

National Stadium, Ta' Qali
Attendance: 2,205
Referee: Haim Lipkovitz (Israel)

Floriana won 2–0 on aggregate.

18 August 1993
19:30

B68 (Faroe Islands)	0–5	Croatia Zagreb
	Report	Cvitanović 15'; E. Olsen 30' (o.g.); Vlaović 43'; Turković 85'; Adžić 88'

Svangaskarð, Toftir
Attendance: 400
Referee: Bill Crombie (Scotland)
1 September 1993
20:15

Croatia Zagreb	6–0	(Faroe Islands) B68
Živković 17'; Vlaović 53', 84', 88', 90'; Halilović 74'	Report

Stadion Maksimir, Zagreb
Attendance: 5,030
Referee: Friedrich Kaupe (Austria)

Croatia Zagreb won 11–0 on aggregate.

18 August 1993
17:00

Skonto (Latvia)	0–1	(Slovenia) Olimpija Ljubljana
	Report	Milinovič 16'

Daugavas stadions, Liepāja
Attendance: 1,800
Referee: Lennart Elofsson (Sweden)
1 September 1993
20:15

Olimpija Ljubljana (Slovenia)	0–1 (a.e.t.)	(Latvia) Skonto
	Report	Troickis 66'
Penalties
Gruškovnjak (penalty scored); Pavlin (penalty scored); Protega (penalty scored); Milinovič (penalty scored); Zulič (penalty scored); Hudarin (penalty scored); Vrabac (penalty missed); Englaro (penalty scored); Simeunovič (penalty scored); Topić (penalty scored); Gruškovnjak (penalty scored); Pavlin (penalty missed)	10–11	(penalty scored) Zemļinskis; (penalty scored) Troickis; (penalty scored) Blagonadeždins; (penalty scored) Semjonovs; (penalty scored) Jeļisejevs; (penalty scored) Babičevs; (penalty missed) Gņedojs; (penalty scored) Draguns; (penalty scored) Stepanovs; (penalty scored) Laizāns; (penalty scored) Zemļinskis; (penalty scored) Troickis

Bežigrad Stadium, Ljubljana
Attendance: 1,500
Referee: László Vágner (Hungary)

1–1 on aggregate; Skonto won 11–10 on penalties.

18 August 1993
20:00

Cwmbrân Town (Wales)	3–2	(Republic of Ireland) Cork City
King 5' (pen.); Ford 26', 27'	Report	Caulfield 62'; Buckley 74'

Cwmbrân Stadium, Cwmbrân
Attendance: 3,582
Referee: Gylfi Orrason (Iceland)
1 September 1993
18:00

Cork City (Republic of Ireland)	2–1	(Wales) Cwmbrân Town
Morley 73'; Glynn 84'	Report	McNeil 8'

Turners Cross, Cork
Attendance: 3,500
Referee: Hans Reygwart (Netherlands)

4–4 on aggregate; Cork City won on away goals.

18 August 1993
17:00

Dinamo Tbilisi (Georgia (country))	2–1	(Northern Ireland) Linfield
S. Arveladze 6'; Inalishvili 66'	Report	Johnston 56'

Boris Paichadze National Stadium, Tbilisi
Attendance: 56,800
Referee: Erman Toroğlu (Turkey)
1 September 1993
21:00

Linfield (Northern Ireland)	1–1	(Georgia (country)) Dinamo Tbilisi
Haylock 70'	Report	S. Arveladze 46'

Windsor Park, Belfast
Attendance: 4,348
Referee: Roy Helge Olsen (Norway)

Linfield won on walkover as Dinamo Tbilisi were disqualified. (Note: Dinamo Tbilisi originally won 3–2 on aggregate, but were later disqualified from the competition by UEFA after a failed attempt to bribe the referee for the first leg. Dinamo Tbilisi had arranged, via an intermediary, for US$5,000 to be paid to the referee, linesmen and fourth official. As a result, Linfield were awarded a walkover victory.)

18 August 1993
20:15

Avenir Beggen (Luxembourg)	0–2	(Norway) Rosenborg
	Report	Bragstad 8'; Løken 54'

Stade rue Henri Dunant, Luxembourg City
Attendance: 798
Referee: Fernand Meese (Belgium)
1 September 1993
19:00

Rosenborg (Norway)	1–0	(Luxembourg) Avenir Beggen
Skammelsrud 69'	Report

Lerkendal Stadion, Trondheim
Attendance: 4,481
Referee: John Lloyd (Wales)

Rosenborg won 3–0 on aggregate.

22 August 1993
17:00

Partizani (Albania)	0–0	(Iceland) ÍA
	Report

Qemal Stafa Stadium, Tirana
Attendance: 3,500
Referee: Mateo Beusan (Croatia)
1 September 1993
19:30

ÍA (Iceland)	3–0	(Albania) Partizani
Högnason 70'; Guðjónsson 72', 80'	Report

Akranesvöllur, Akranes
Attendance: 1,561
Referee: Aron Schmidhuber (Germany)

ÍA won 3–0 on aggregate.

18 August 1993
19:00

Omonia (Cyprus)	2–1	(Switzerland) Aarau
Kizilashvili 15', 61'	Report	Ratinho 62'

Makario Stadium, Nicosia
Attendance: 14,268
Referee: Gheorghe Constantin (Romania)
1 September 1993
20:00

Aarau (Switzerland)	2–0	(Cyprus) Omonia
Stiel 7'; Heldmann 37'	Report

Stadion Brügglifeld, Aarau
Attendance: 8,356
Referee: Hermann Albrecht (Germany)

Aarau won 3–2 on aggregate.

18 August 1993
18:00

Zimbru Chișinău (Moldova)	1–1	(Israel) Beitar Jerusalem
Uzun 82'	Report	Harazi 15'

Stadionul Republican, Chișinău
Attendance: 18,000
Referee: Periklis Vasilakis (Greece)
1 September 1993
17:30

Beitar Jerusalem (Israel)	2–0	(Moldova) Zimbru Chișinău
Harazi 4'; Grechnyov 72' (pen.)	Report

Teddy Stadium, Jerusalem
Attendance: 7,000
Referee: Luben Spasov (Bulgaria)

Beitar Jerusalem won 3–1 on aggregate.
