= 1993–94 UEFA Champions League first round =

European football tournament

The 1993–94 UEFA Champions League first round was the first stage of the competition proper of the 1993–94 UEFA Champions League, and featured 32 teams. It began on 15 September with the first legs and ended on 29 September 1993 with the second legs. The 16 winners advanced to the second round.

Times are CET/CEST, (Note: CEST (UTC+2) for dates up to 25 September 1993 (first legs), and CET (UTC+1) for dates thereafter (second legs).) as listed by UEFA.

== Teams ==
In total, 32 teams participated in the first round: 22 teams which entered in this round, and 10 winners of the preliminary round.

Key to colours
Winners of first round advanced to second round

First round participants

Team	Notes	Coeff.
(Italy) Milan		3.408
(Spain) Barcelona		2.986
(England) Manchester United		2.910
(Germany) Werder Bremen		2.848
(Belgium) Anderlecht		2.671
(France) Monaco		2.667
(Portugal) Porto		2.589
(Russia) Spartak Moscow		2.536

Team	Coeff.
(Scotland) Rangers	2.504
(Romania) Steaua București	2.366
(Netherlands) Feyenoord	2.325
(Turkey) Galatasaray	2.227
(Czech Republic) Sparta Prague	2.205
(Poland) Lech Poznań	2.089
Austria Wien	2.076
(Denmark) Copenhagen	2.053

Team	Notes	Coeff.
(Greece) AEK Athens		1.994
(Sweden) AIK		1.954
(Ukraine) Dynamo Kyiv		1.692
(Hungary) Kispest Honvéd		1.573
(Belarus) Dinamo Minsk		1.250
(Bulgaria) Levski Sofia		1.125
(Norway) Rosenborg		0.971
(Switzerland) Aarau		0.939

Team	Notes	Coeff.
(Finland) HJK		0.855
(Northern Ireland) Linfield		0.833
Croatia Zagreb		0.750
(Iceland) ÍA		0.656
(Malta) Floriana		0.563
(Republic of Ireland) Cork City		0.500
(Latvia) Skonto		0.500
(Israel) Beitar Jerusalem		0.000

Notes

1. ^{†} French club and Champions League title holders Marseille were disqualified from the competition by the UEFA Executive Committee on 6 September 1993 due to their involvement in a match-fixing scandal. Monaco took the vacated French berth on 8 September.
2. ^{PR} Winners from the preliminary round

== Format ==
Each tie was played over two legs, with each team playing one leg at home. The team that scored more goals on aggregate over the two legs advanced to the next round. If the aggregate score was level, the away goals rule was applied, i.e. the team that scored more goals away from home over the two legs advanced. If away goals were also equal, then extra time was played. The away goals rule would be again applied after extra time, i.e. if there were goals scored during extra time and the aggregate score was still level, the visiting team advanced by virtue of more away goals scored. If no goals were scored during extra time, the tie was decided by penalty shoot-out.

== Seeding ==
The draw for the first round was held on 14 July 1993 in Geneva, Switzerland. The 32 teams were divided into a seeded and unseeded pot, each containing 16 teams, for the draw.

Seeded		Unseeded	
(France) Monaco; (Italy) Milan; (Spain) Barcelona; (England) Manchester United; (Germany) Werder Bremen; (Belgium) Anderlecht; (Portugal) Porto; (Russia) Spartak Moscow	(Scotland) Rangers; (Romania) Steaua București; (Netherlands) Feyenoord; (Turkey) Galatasaray; (Czech Republic) Sparta Prague; (Poland) Lech Poznań; Austria Wien; (Denmark) Copenhagen	(Greece) AEK Athens; (Sweden) AIK; (Ukraine) Dynamo Kyiv; (Hungary) Kispest Honvéd; (Belarus) Dinamo Minsk; (Bulgaria) Levski Sofia; (Norway) Rosenborg; (Switzerland) Aarau	(Finland) HJK; (Northern Ireland) Linfield; Croatia Zagreb; (Iceland) ÍA; (Malta) Floriana; (Republic of Ireland) Cork City; (Latvia) Skonto; (Israel) Beitar Jerusalem

Notes

1. ^{†} French club and Champions League title holders Marseille originally took part in the draw, but were later banned and replaced by Monaco. Thus Monaco effectively took the automatic top seed reserved for the title holders in the draw.
2. ^{‡} Winners of the preliminary round, whose identity was not known at the time of draw.

== Summary ==
The first legs were played on 15 and 16 September, and the second legs on 28 and 29 September 1993.

Team 1	Agg.	Team 2	1st leg	2nd leg
Porto (Portugal)	2–0	(Malta) Floriana	2–0	0–0
ÍA (Iceland)	1–3	(Netherlands) Feyenoord	1–0	0–3
Monaco (France)	2–1	(Greece) AEK Athens	1–0	1–1
Steaua București (Romania)	4–4 (a)	Croatia Zagreb	1–2	3–2
Rangers (Scotland)	4–4 (a)	(Bulgaria) Levski Sofia	3–2	1–2
Werder Bremen (Germany)	6–3	(Belarus) Dinamo Minsk	5–2	1–1
Linfield (Northern Ireland)	3–4	(Denmark) Copenhagen	3–0	0–4 (a.e.t.)
Aarau (Switzerland)	0–1	(Italy) Milan	0–1	0–0
AIK (Sweden)	1–2	(Czech Republic) Sparta Prague	1–0	0–2
HJK (Finland)	0–6	(Belgium) Anderlecht	0–3	0–3
Kispest Honvéd (Hungary)	3–5	(England) Manchester United	2–3	1–2
Galatasaray (Turkey)	3–1	(Republic of Ireland) Cork City	2–1	1–0
Lech Poznań (Poland)	7–2	(Israel) Beitar Jerusalem	3–0	4–2
Skonto (Latvia)	0–9	(Russia) Spartak Moscow	0–5	0–4
Dynamo Kyiv (Ukraine)	4–5	(Spain) Barcelona	3–1	1–4
Rosenborg (Norway)	4–5	Austria Wien	3–1	1–4

== Matches ==
15 September 1993
21:30

Porto (Portugal)	2–0	(Malta) Floriana
Kostadinov 8'; Semedo 78'	Report

Estádio das Antas, Porto
Attendance: 5,200
Referee: Roger Philippi (Luxembourg)
29 September 1993
15:00

Floriana (Malta)	0–0	(Portugal) Porto
	Report

National Stadium, Ta' Qali
Attendance: 1,456
Referee: Bujar Pregja (Albania)

Porto won 2–0 on aggregate.

15 September 1993
20:30

ÍA (Iceland)	1–0	(Netherlands) Feyenoord
Ó. Þórðarson 75'	Report

Laugardalsvöllur, Reykjavík
Attendance: 6,327
Referee: Sándor Varga (Hungary)
29 September 1993
20:00

Feyenoord (Netherlands)	3–0	(Iceland) ÍA
Refos 26'; Obiku 61'; Blinker 79'	Report

De Kuip, Rotterdam
Attendance: 24,054
Referee: Keith Burge (Wales)

Feyenoord won 3–1 on aggregate.

15 September 1993
20:30

Monaco (France)	1–0	(Greece) AEK Athens
Vlachos 80' (o.g.)	Report

Stade Louis II, Monaco
Attendance: 7,344
Referee: Manuel Díaz Vega (Spain)
29 September 1993
21:00

AEK Athens (Greece)	1–1	(France) Monaco
Slišković 12'	Report	Djorkaeff 5'

Nikos Goumas Stadium, Nea Filadelfeia
Attendance: 22,982
Referee: John Blankenstein (Netherlands)

Monaco won 2–1 on aggregate.

15 September 1993
20:00

Steaua București (Romania)	1–2	Croatia Zagreb
Panduru 34'	Report	Cvitanovic 15'; Jeličić 62'

Stadionul Steaua, Bucharest
Attendance: 6,917
Referee: Vadim Zhuk (Belarus)
28 September 1993
20:15

Croatia Zagreb	2–3	(Romania) Steaua București
Vlaović 8'; Adžić 71'	Report	Panduru 40'; Vlădoiu 49', 61'

Bežigrad Stadium, Ljubljana, Slovenia (Note: Due to security issues caused by Operation Medak Pocket, Croatian teams were required to play their home matches at neutral venues indefinitely. Therefore, Croatia Zagreb played their first round home match at Bežigrad Stadium, Ljubljana, Slovenia, instead of their regular stadium, Stadion Maksimir, Zagreb.)
Attendance: 5,000
Referee: Vassilios Nikakis (Greece)

4–4 on aggregate; Steaua București won on away goals.

15 September 1993
20:00

Rangers (Scotland)	3–2	(Bulgaria) Levski Sofia
McPherson 45'; Hateley 57', 79'	Report	Borimirov 78'; Todorov 82'

Ibrox Park, Glasgow
Attendance: 37,013
Referee: Kim Milton Nielsen (Denmark)
29 September 1993
19:00

Levski Sofia (Bulgaria)	2–1	(Scotland) Rangers
Sirakov 36'; Todorov 90'	Report	Durrant 43'

Vasil Levski National Stadium, Sofia
Attendance: 40,000
Referee: Manuel Díaz Vega (Spain)

4–4 on aggregate; Levski Sofia won on away goals.

16 September 1993
19:30

Werder Bremen (Germany)	5–2	(Belarus) Dinamo Minsk
Hobsch 26', 32', 60'; Rufer 55', 90'	Report	Herasimets 51'; Vyalichka 76'

Weserstadion, Bremen
Attendance: 10,274
Referee: Serge Muhmenthaler (Switzerland)
29 September 1993
19:00

Dinamo Minsk (Belarus)	1–1	(Germany) Werder Bremen
Byalkevich 40'	Report	Rufer 81' (pen.)

Dinamo Stadium, Minsk
Attendance: 8,700
Referee: Sándor Puhl (Hungary)

Werder Bremen won 6–3 on aggregate.

16 September 1993
20:00

Linfield (Northern Ireland)	3–0	(Denmark) Copenhagen
Haylock 38'; McConnell 43'; Johnston 60'	Report

Windsor Park, Belfast
Attendance: 4,375
Referee: Freddy Philippoz (Switzerland)
29 September 1993
20:00

Copenhagen (Denmark)	4–0 (a.e.t.)	(Northern Ireland) Linfield
Møller 2'; Ma. Johansen 26'; Højer Nielsen 90'; Mikkelsen 96'	Report

Parken Stadium, Copenhagen
Attendance: 7,051
Referee: Roman Steindl (Austria)

Copenhagen won 4–3 on aggregate.

15 September 1993
20:30

Aarau (Switzerland)	0–1	(Italy) Milan
	Report	Papin 54'

Hardturm, Zürich
Attendance: 9,400
Referee: Alan Snoddy (Northern Ireland)
29 September 1993
20:30

Milan (Italy)	0–0	(Switzerland) Aarau
	Report

San Siro, Milan
Attendance: 58,993
Referee: Marc Batta (France)

Milan won 1–0 on aggregate.

15 September 1993
19:00

AIK (Sweden)	1–0	(Czech Republic) Sparta Prague
Lidman 36'	Report

Råsunda Stadium, Solna
Attendance: 5,854
Referee: Andrey Butenko (Russia)
29 September 1993
18:15

Sparta Prague (Czech Republic)	2–0	(Sweden) AIK
Siegl 15', 81'	Report

Stadion Letná, Prague
Attendance: 16,654
Referee: Jan Damgaard (Denmark)

Sparta Prague won 2–1 on aggregate.

15 September 1993
18:00

HJK (Finland)	0–3	(Belgium) Anderlecht
	Report	Bosman 50'; Versavel 77'; Boffin 84'

Tammelan Stadion, Tampere
Attendance: 1,584
Referee: Rune Pedersen (Norway)
29 September 1993
20:00

Anderlecht (Belgium)	3–0	(Finland) HJK
Nilis 16', 21', 42'	Report

Stade Constant Vanden Stock, Brussels
Attendance: 12,225
Referee: António Almeida Marçal (Portugal)

Anderlecht won 6–0 on aggregate.

15 September 1993
20:05

Kispest Honvéd (Hungary)	2–3	(England) Manchester United
Szabados 40'; Stefanov 68'	Report	Keane 8', 42'; Cantona 44'

Bozsik József Stadion, Budapest
Attendance: 8,000
Referee: Piero Ceccarini (Italy)
29 September 1993
20:05

Manchester United (England)	2–1	(Hungary) Kispest Honvéd
Bruce 55', 64'	Report	Sallói 78'

Old Trafford, Manchester
Attendance: 35,718
Referee: Antonio López Nieto (Spain)

Manchester United won 5–3 on aggregate.

15 September 1993
20:30

Galatasaray (Turkey)	2–1	(Republic of Ireland) Cork City
Türkyilmaz 30'; Arif 51'	Report	Barry 67'

Ali Sami Yen Stadium, Istanbul
Attendance: 17,804
Referee: José María García-Aranda (Spain)
29 September 1993
16:00

Cork City (Republic of Ireland)	0–1	(Turkey) Galatasaray
	Report	Türkyilmaz 76'

Bishopstown Stadium, Cork
Attendance: 4,100
Referee: Didier Pauchard (France)

Galatasaray won 3–1 on aggregate.

15 September 1993
17:00

Lech Poznań (Poland)	3–0	(Israel) Beitar Jerusalem
Moskal 8'; Podbrożny 32' (pen.); Trzeciak 60'	Report

Stadion Miejski, Poznań
Attendance: 4,184
Referee: Gheorghe Ionescu (Romania)
29 September 1993
15:00

Beitar Jerusalem (Israel)	2–4	(Poland) Lech Poznań
Ohana 12'; Schwartz 73'	Report	Łukasik 4'; Trzeciak 24'; Podbrożny 31'; Dembiński 70'

Teddy Stadium, Jerusalem
Attendance: 2,500
Referee: John Purcell (Republic of Ireland)

Lech Poznań won 7–2 on aggregate.

15 September 1993
18:00

Skonto (Latvia)	0–5	(Russia) Spartak Moscow
	Report	Pohodin 2', 40'; Rodionov 7', 42'; Beschastnykh 61'

Daugava Stadium, Riga
Attendance: 3,200
Referee: Dimitar Momirov (Bulgaria)
29 September 1993
19:00

Spartak Moscow (Russia)	4–0	(Latvia) Skonto
Tsymbalar 5', 39'; Pisarev 14'; Onopko 89'	Report

Luzhniki Stadium, Moscow
Attendance: 2,000
Referee: Joe Timmons (Scotland)

Spartak Moscow won 9–0 on aggregate.

15 September 1993
19:00

Dynamo Kyiv (Ukraine)	3–1	(Spain) Barcelona
Shkapenko 5'; Leonenko 44' (pen.), 55'	Report	Koeman 27' (pen.)

Republican Stadium, Kyiv
Attendance: 60,000
Referee: Philip Don (England)
29 September 1993
21:00

Barcelona (Spain)	4–1	(Ukraine) Dynamo Kyiv
Laudrup 9'; Bakero 17', 47'; Koeman 67'	Report	Rebrov 28'

Estadi del Futbol Club Barcelona, Barcelona
Attendance: 88,600
Referee: Angelo Amendolia (Italy)

Barcelona won 5–4 on aggregate.

15 September 1993
19:00

Rosenborg (Norway)	3–1	Austria Wien
Tangen 28' (pen.); Leonhardsen 35'; Løken 42'	Report	Zsak 33'

Lerkendal Stadion, Trondheim
Attendance: 9,619
Referee: Simo Ruokonen (Finland)
29 September 1993
19:35

Austria Wien	4–1	(Norway) Rosenborg
Narbekovas 12'; Schmid 50'; Zsak 74'; Kogler 81'	Report	Dahlum 32'

Franz-Horr-Stadion, Vienna
Attendance: 6,300
Referee: Zbigniew Przesmycki (Poland)

Austria Wien won 5–4 on aggregate.
