= 1994 UEFA Champions League final =

Association football match

- Match programme cover
- Event: 1993–94 UEFA Champions League
Milan	Barcelona
(Italy)	(Spain)
4	0
- Date: 18 May 1994
- Venue: Olympic Stadium, Athens
- Referee: Philip Don (England)
- Attendance: 70,000

The 1994 UEFA Champions League final, originally known as the 1994 European Cup final, was a football match between Italian club Milan and Spanish club Barcelona, played on 18 May 1994 at the Olympic Stadium in Athens, Greece.

Having won La Liga for the fourth consecutive year, Barcelona were favourites to win a second European Cup/UEFA Champions League title in three years. Milan's preparation before the final was in disarray with injured or suspended talent and other issues. Milan's legendary striker Marco van Basten and their £13 million young sensation Gianluigi Lentini (then the world's most expensive footballer) were both injured, while Franco Baresi and defender Alessandro Costacurta were both suspended. UEFA regulations at the time, which limited teams to fielding a maximum of three non-nationals, meant that Milan coach Fabio Capello was forced to leave out Florin Răducioiu, Jean-Pierre Papin and Brian Laudrup. On Barcelona's side, the rule saw coach Johan Cruyff choosing not to pick Michael Laudrup in his squad for the final, which caused Capello to state after the game "Laudrup was the guy I feared but Cruyff left him out, and that was his mistake". Laudrup left Barcelona for their arch-rival, Real Madrid, at the end of the season.

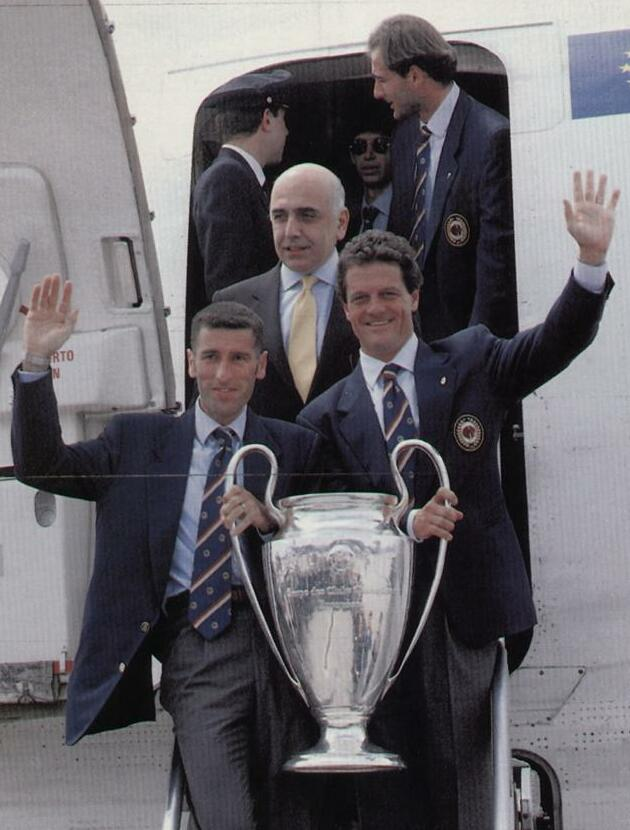
Mauro Tassotti, Fabio Capello and Adriano Galliani with the UEFA Champions League trophy in their return to Italy.

== Teams ==
In the following table, finals until 1992 were in the European Cup era, since 1993 were in the UEFA Champions League era.

Team	Previous final appearances (bold indicates winners)
(Italy) Milan	6 (1958, **1963**, **1969**, **1989**, **1990**, 1993)
(Spain) Barcelona	3 (1961, 1986, **1992**)

== Route to the final ==
(Italy) Milan				Round	(Spain) Barcelona			
Opponent	Agg.	1st leg	2nd leg		Opponent	Agg.	1st leg	2nd leg
(Switzerland) Aarau	1–0	1–0 (A)	0–0 (H)	First round	(Ukraine) Dynamo Kyiv	5–4	1–3 (A)	4–1 (H)
(Denmark) Copenhagen	7–0	6–0 (A)	1–0 (H)	Second round	Austria Wien	5–1	3–0 (H)	2–1 (A)
Opponent	Result			Group stage	Opponent	Result		
(Belgium) Anderlecht	0–0 (A)			Matchday 1	(Turkey) Galatasaray	0–0 (A)		
(Portugal) Porto	3–0 (H)			Matchday 2	(France) Monaco	2–0 (H)		
(Germany) Werder Bremen	2–1 (H)			Matchday 3	(Russia) Spartak Moscow	2–2 (A)		
(Germany) Werder Bremen	1–1 (A)			Matchday 4	(Russia) Spartak Moscow	5–1 (H)		
(Belgium) Anderlecht	0–0 (H)			Matchday 5	(Turkey) Galatasaray	3–0 (H)		
(Portugal) Porto	0–0 (A)			Matchday 6	(France) Monaco	1–0 (A)		
**Group B winner**: Pos / Team / Pld / Pts; **1** / (Italy) Milan / **6** / **8**; 2 / (Portugal) Porto / 6 / **7**; 3 / (Germany) Werder Bremen / 6 / **5**; 4 / (Belgium) Anderlecht / 6 / **4**; Source: UEFA				Final standings	**Group A winner**: Pos / Team / Pld / Pts; **1** / (Spain) Barcelona / **6** / **10**; 2 / (France) Monaco / 6 / **7**; 3 / (Russia) Spartak Moscow / 6 / **5**; 4 / (Turkey) Galatasaray / 6 / **2**; Source: UEFA			
Opponent	Result			Knockout phase	Opponent	Result		
(France) Monaco	3–0 (H)			Semi-finals	(Portugal) Porto	3–0 (H)		

== Match ==
=== Summary ===
Milan played in their all-white away strip, which historically they use in finals of the European Cup/UEFA Champions League, while Barcelona played in their red and blue strip. Milan dominated early and were rewarded when Dejan Savićević ran down the right flank and passed to Daniele Massaro, who tapped the ball into an empty net. Massaro banged in his second just before half-time to make it 2–0 after a solo run by Roberto Donadoni down the left wing.

In the 47th minute, Savićević capitalised on a defensive error by Miguel Ángel Nadal to lob goalkeeper Andoni Zubizarreta for the third goal. Eight minutes later, after Savićević had hit a post and the Barcelona defence had failed to clear, Milan midfielder Marcel Desailly beat the offside trap to make it 4–0, which ended up being the final score. Desailly became the first player to win the trophy in consecutive years with different clubs after winning with Marseille in 1993. The match held the record for the largest margin in a final in the Champions League era until it was surpassed in the 2025 UEFA Champions League final, when French side Paris Saint-Germain beat Inter Milan 5-0 in Munich.

=== Details ===
18 May 1994
21:15 UTC+3

Milan (Italy)	4–0	(Spain) Barcelona
Massaro 22', 45+2'; Savićević 47'; Desailly 58'	Report

Olympic Stadium, Athens
Attendance: 70,000
Referee: Philip Don (England)

**Milan**	**Barcelona**

GK	1	(Italy) Sebastiano Rossi
RB	2	(Italy) Mauro Tassotti (c)	(yellow card) 35'
CB	5	(Italy) Filippo Galli
CB	6	(Italy) Paolo Maldini		(substituted off) 83'
LB	3	(Italy) Christian Panucci	(yellow card) 88'
RM	9	(Croatia) Zvonimir Boban
CM	4	(Italy) Demetrio Albertini	(yellow card) 53'
CM	8	(France) Marcel Desailly
LM	7	(Italy) Roberto Donadoni
RF	10	(Federal Republic of Yugoslavia) Dejan Savićević
LF	11	(Italy) Daniele Massaro	(yellow card) 45'
Substitutes:
GK	12	(Italy) Mario Ielpo
CB	13	(Italy) Stefano Nava		(substituted on) 83'
RM	14	(Italy) Angelo Carbone
RM	15	(Italy) Gianluigi Lentini
LF	16	(Italy) Marco Simone
Manager:
(Italy) Fabio Capello

GK	1	(Spain) Andoni Zubizarreta
RB	2	(Spain) Albert Ferrer	(yellow card) 58'
DM	3	(Spain) Pep Guardiola
CB	4	(Netherlands) Ronald Koeman
CB	5	(Spain) Miguel Ángel Nadal	(yellow card) 54'
CM	6	(Spain) José Mari Bakero (c)	(yellow card) 48'
LB	7	(Spain) Sergi Barjuán	(yellow card) 55'	(substituted off) 71'
RF	8	(Bulgaria) Hristo Stoichkov	(yellow card) 24'
CM	9	(Spain) Guillermo Amor
CF	10	(Brazil) Romário
LF	11	(Spain) Txiki Begiristain		(substituted off) 51'
Substitutes:
DF	12	(Spain) Juan Carlos
GK	13	(Spain) Carles Busquets
MF	14	(Spain) Eusebio Sacristán		(substituted on) 51'
MF	15	(Spain) Jon Andoni Goikoetxea
MF	16	(Spain) Quique Estebaranz		(substituted on) 71'
Manager:
(Netherlands) Johan Cruyff

Linesmen:
Rob Harris (England)
Roy Pearson (England)
Fourth official:
Martin Bodenham (England)

== See also ==
- 1989 European Super Cup – contested between same teams
- 1994 European Cup Winners' Cup final
- 1994 European Super Cup
- 1994 UEFA Cup final
- 1993–94 AC Milan season
- 1993–94 FC Barcelona season
- AC Milan in international football
- FC Barcelona in international football
