= 1993–94 UEFA Champions League second round =

Football results

The 1993–94 UEFA Champions League second round was the second stage of the competition proper of the 1993–94 UEFA Champions League, and featured the 16 winners from the first round. It began on 20 October with the first legs and ended on 3 November 1993 with the second legs. The eight winners advanced to the group stage.

Times are CET (UTC+1), as listed by UEFA.

== Teams ==
The 16 winners of the first round advanced to the second round.

Key to colours
Winners of second round advanced to group stage

Second round participants
Team	Coeff.
(Italy) Milan	3.408
(Spain) Barcelona	2.986
(England) Manchester United	2.910
(Germany) Werder Bremen	2.848
(Belgium) Anderlecht	2.671
(France) Monaco	2.667
(Portugal) Porto	2.589
(Russia) Spartak Moscow	2.536
(Romania) Steaua București	2.366
(Netherlands) Feyenoord	2.325
(Turkey) Galatasaray	2.227
(Czech Republic) Sparta Prague	2.205
(Poland) Lech Poznań	2.089
Austria Wien	2.076
(Denmark) Copenhagen	2.053
(Bulgaria) Levski Sofia	1.125

== Format ==
Each tie was played over two legs, with each team playing one leg at home. The team that scored more goals on aggregate over the two legs advanced to the next round. If the aggregate score was level, the away goals rule was applied, i.e. the team that scored more goals away from home over the two legs advanced. If away goals were also equal, then extra time was played. The away goals rule would be again applied after extra time, i.e. if there were goals scored during extra time and the aggregate score was still level, the visiting team advanced by virtue of more away goals scored. If no goals were scored during extra time, the tie was decided by penalty shoot-out.

== Seeding ==
The draw for the second round was held on 1 October 1993 in Geneva, Switzerland. The 16 teams were divided into a seeded and unseeded pot, each containing 8 teams, for the draw.

Seeded	Unseeded
(Italy) Milan; (Spain) Barcelona; (England) Manchester United; (Germany) Werder Bremen; (Belgium) Anderlecht; (France) Monaco; (Portugal) Porto; (Russia) Spartak Moscow	(Romania) Steaua București; (Netherlands) Feyenoord; (Turkey) Galatasaray; (Czech Republic) Sparta Prague; (Poland) Lech Poznań; Austria Wien; (Denmark) Copenhagen; (Bulgaria) Levski Sofia

== Summary ==
The first legs were played on 20 October, and the second legs on 3 November 1993.

Team 1	Agg.	Team 2	1st leg	2nd leg
Porto (Portugal)	1–0	(Netherlands) Feyenoord	1–0	0–0
Monaco (France)	4–2	(Romania) Steaua București	4–1	0–1
Levski Sofia (Bulgaria)	2–3	(Germany) Werder Bremen	2–2	0–1
Copenhagen (Denmark)	0–7	(Italy) Milan	0–6	0–1
Sparta Prague (Czech Republic)	2–5	(Belgium) Anderlecht	0–1	2–4
Manchester United (England)	3–3 (a)	(Turkey) Galatasaray	3–3	0–0
Lech Poznań (Poland)	2–7	(Russia) Spartak Moscow	1–5	1–2
Barcelona (Spain)	5–1	Austria Wien	3–0	2–1

== Matches ==
20 October 1993
21:45

Porto (Portugal)	1–0	(Netherlands) Feyenoord
Domingos 90'	Report

Estádio das Antas, Porto
Attendance: 22,700
Referee: Rémi Harrel (France)
3 November 1993
20:00

Feyenoord (Netherlands)	0–0	(Portugal) Porto
	Report

De Kuip, Rotterdam
Attendance: 42,386
Referee: Kim Milton Nielsen (Denmark)

Porto won 1–0 on aggregate.

20 October 1993
20:45

Monaco (France)	4–1	(Romania) Steaua București
Ikpeba 50', 75'; Klinsmann 52', 64'	Report	Dumitrescu 22' (pen.)

Stade Louis II, Monaco
Attendance: 5,500
Referee: David Elleray (England)
3 November 1993
19:00

Steaua București (Romania)	1–0	(France) Monaco
Dumitrescu 85'	Report

Stadionul Steaua, Bucharest
Attendance: 21,000
Referee: Serge Muhmenthaler (Switzerland)

Monaco won 4–2 on aggregate.

20 October 1993
20:00

Levski Sofia (Bulgaria)	2–2	(Germany) Werder Bremen
Yankov 75'; Ginchev 90'	Report	Bode 50'; Rufer 52'

Vasil Levski National Stadium, Sofia
Attendance: 40,000
Referee: Mario van der Ende (Netherlands)
3 November 1993
19:15

Werder Bremen (Germany)	1–0	(Bulgaria) Levski Sofia
Basler 73'	Report

Weserstadion, Bremen
Attendance: 26,953
Referee: Pierluigi Pairetto (Italy)

Werder Bremen won 3–2 on aggregate.

20 October 1993
20:15

Copenhagen (Denmark)	0–6	(Italy) Milan
	Report	Papin 1', 72'; Simone 5', 16'; Laudrup 44'; Orlando 61'

Parken Stadium, Copenhagen
Attendance: 34,285
Referee: Guy Goethals (Belgium)
3 November 1993
20:30

Milan (Italy)	1–0	(Denmark) Copenhagen
Papin 45'	Report

San Siro, Milan
Attendance: 6,786
Referee: Sándor Puhl (Hungary)

Milan won 7–0 on aggregate.

20 October 1993
18:00

Sparta Prague (Czech Republic)	0–1	(Belgium) Anderlecht
	Report	Nilis 74'

Stadion Letná, Prague
Attendance: 25,621
Referee: Christer Fällström (Sweden)
3 November 1993
20:00

Anderlecht (Belgium)	4–2	(Czech Republic) Sparta Prague
Bosman 2'; Nilis 47', 73'; Versavel 87'	Report	Dvirnyk 17', 69'

Stade Constant Vanden Stock, Brussels
Attendance: 13,464
Referee: Antonio Martín Navarrete (Spain)

Anderlecht won 5–2 on aggregate.

20 October 1993
20:05

Manchester United (England)	3–3	(Turkey) Galatasaray
Robson 3'; Hakan Şükür 13' (o.g.); Cantona 81'	Report	Arif 16'; Türkyilmaz 31', 63'

Old Trafford, Manchester
Attendance: 39,396
Referee: Peter Mikkelsen (Denmark)
3 November 1993
19:30

Galatasaray (Turkey)	0–0	(England) Manchester United
	Report

Ali Sami Yen Stadium, Istanbul
Attendance: 30,356
Referee: Kurt Röthlisberger (Switzerland)

3–3 on aggregate; Galatasaray won on away goals.

20 October 1993
18:00

Lech Poznań (Poland)	1–5	(Russia) Spartak Moscow
Podbrożny 44' (pen.)	Report	Pisarev 8', 62'; Karpin 10'; Onopko 30', 53'

Stadion Miejski, Poznań
Attendance: 8,762
Referee: Karl-Josef Assenmacher (Germany)
3 November 1993
19:00

Spartak Moscow (Russia)	2–1	(Poland) Lech Poznań
Karpin 7'; Khlestov 81'	Report	Dembiński 30'

Luzhniki Stadium, Moscow
Attendance: 12,800
Referee: Gerd Grabher (Austria)

Spartak Moscow won 7–2 on aggregate.

20 October 1993
21:00

Barcelona (Spain)	3–0	Austria Wien
Koeman 33' (pen.), 67'; Estebaranz 89'	Report

Estadi del Futbol Club Barcelona, Barcelona
Attendance: 87,600
Referee: Hellmut Krug (Germany)
3 November 1993
19:35

Austria Wien	1–2	(Spain) Barcelona
Ogris 40'	Report	Stoichkov 5', 78'

Ernst-Happel-Stadion, Vienna
Attendance: 19,000
Referee: Jim McCluskey (Scotland)

Barcelona won 5–1 on aggregate.
