= István Stefanov =

Hungarian footballer (1964–2024)

Personal information
- Date of birth: 19 July 1964
- Date of death: 5 December 2024 (aged 60)
- Place of death: Budapest
- Position: Midfielder

Senior career*
Years	Team	Apps	(Gls)
1985–1993	Csepel SC		
1993–1996	Kispesti Honved FC		
1996	Békéscsabai Előre SE		
1997	FC 1899 Szeged		
- * Club domestic league appearances and goals

István Stefanov (19 July 1964 – 5 December 2024) was a Hungarian footballer who played as a midfielder. He was of Bulgarian descent. Stefanov died in December 2024, at the age of 60. He is remembered for scoring against Manchester United in the 1993–94 UEFA Champions League first round, playing in the 1994–95 UEFA Cup and winning the 1995–96 Magyar Kupa for Kispest Honvéd.
