= 1992–93 Irish League =

Irish League
- Season: 1992–93
- Champions: Linfield; 41st Irish title
- Matches played: 240
- Goals scored: 755 (3.15 per match)
- Top goalscorer: Steve Cowan (23 goals)

Location of teams in the Irish League from 1990–95
Location of Belfast-based teams in the Irish League from 1990–95

The 1992–93 Irish League was the 92nd edition of the Irish League, the highest level of league competition in Northern Irish football. The league consisted of 16 teams, and Linfield won the championship.

== League standings ==
Pos	Team	Pld	W	D	L	GF	GA	GD	Pts	Qualification
1	Linfield (C)	30	20	6	4	49	15	+34	66	Qualification for the Champions League preliminary round
2	Crusaders	30	21	3	6	53	27	+26	66	Qualification for the UEFA Cup first round
3	Bangor	30	20	4	6	61	32	+29	64	Qualification for the European Cup Winners' Cup qualifying round
4	Portadown	30	18	9	3	70	26	+44	63	
5	Distillery	30	20	2	8	61	36	+25	62	
6	Glenavon	30	14	6	10	48	36	+12	48	
7	Glentoran	30	13	8	9	70	40	+30	47	
8	Ards	30	12	9	9	45	45	0	45	
9	Carrick Rangers	30	12	2	16	50	73	−23	38	
10	Ballymena United	30	10	6	14	41	51	−10	36	
11	Cliftonville	30	10	3	17	42	48	−6	33	
12	Omagh Town	30	9	5	16	38	57	−19	32	
13	Larne	30	9	3	18	41	59	−18	30	
14	Newry Town	30	5	5	20	30	72	−42	20	
15	Coleraine	30	5	3	22	28	63	−35	18	
16	Ballyclare Comrades	30	2	6	22	28	75	−47	12	

Source: rsssf.com
(C) Champions

== Results ==
Home \ Away	ARD	BAN	BLC	BLM	CRK	CLI	COL	CRU	DIS	GLV	GLT	LRN	LIN	NEW	OMA	POR
Ards		1–4	1–1	0–0	2–0	1–0	3–1	2–0	1–1	1–2	0–3	0–0	0–2	1–0	2–2	2–2
Bangor	4–3		4–1	3–2	4–0	3–1	3–1	2–1	1–3	1–3	2–1	5–1	1–0	0–0	1–0	2–2
Ballyclare Comrades	0–1	0–2		2–3	0–1	1–1	3–4	1–3	0–2	0–2	2–5	3–2	1–3	2–4	2–2	0–0
Ballymena United	3–4	0–1	2–2		2–1	0–1	1–1	1–0	4–1	0–5	2–8	2–1	1–2	3–2	0–1	0–2
Carrick Rangers	3–2	2–4	4–1	3–3		1–2	3–0	0–3	1–5	3–1	1–1	3–1	0–4	0–2	3–1	1–6
Cliftonville	1–2	0–1	1–0	1–1	2–3		4–0	1–2	1–2	0–2	2–3	3–1	0–4	5–1	3–1	2–0
Coleraine	1–3	0–2	3–0	1–3	1–2	1–1		1–4	1–2	2–0	2–1	1–4	0–1	1–2	1–2	0–3
Crusaders	1–1	1–0	1–1	1–0	2–0	1–2	3–1		2–0	3–2	2–1	3–2	1–0	3–0	2–0	0–3
Distillery	2–1	3–2	4–0	1–0	3–2	2–1	2–0	0–2		1–2	0–3	2–1	1–0	5–0	2–0	3–0
Glenavon	0–0	1–1	2–1	0–2	4–1	2–0	0–1	0–2	2–1		2–2	1–0	1–2	4–0	3–2	0–3
Glentoran	1–1	0–2	5–0	1–4	1–2	3–0	2–2	1–2	1–1	0–0		4–0	1–2	6–1	3–0	3–2
Larne	1–3	0–1	3–1	1–0	4–1	2–0	1–0	0–1	1–4	1–3	2–4		0–0	4–2	4–2	0–1
Linfield	1–0	0–0	4–0	1–1	3–0	3–0	2–0	1–0	2–1	1–0	2–0	5–2		0–0	1–0	0–3
Newry Town	2–3	2–1	0–2	0–1	2–4	1–5	2–0	1–3	2–5	1–1	1–1	0–1	0–2		0–1	1–1
Omagh Town	1–4	0–4	2–1	2–0	1–3	2–1	2–0	1–2	1–2	3–2	0–4	1–1	1–1	4–0		2–2
Portadown	6–0	3–0	4–0	2–0	6–2	2–1	2–1	2–2	2–0	1–1	1–1	3–0	0–0	3–1	3–1	

Source: Irish League Archive
Legend: Blue = home team win; Yellow = draw; Red = away team win.
