= Alexander Högnason =

Icelandic footballer

Personal information
- Full name: Alexander Högnason
- Date of birth: 7 August 1968 (age 58)
- Place of birth: Akranes, Iceland
- Position: Defender

Senior career*
Years	Team	Apps	(Gls)
1986–2000	ÍA	169	(29)
2001	Fylkir	7	(0)

International career
1984	Iceland U17	10	(2)
1985	Iceland U19	4	(0)
1988	Iceland U21	4	(0)
1990–1996	Iceland	3	(1)
- * Club domestic league appearances and goals

Alexander Högnason (born 7 August 1968) is an Icelandic former footballer who played as a defender. He won three caps for the Iceland national football team between 1990 and 1996 and scored once.

Alexander played for ÍA Akranes from 1986 to 2000, before playing for Fylkir Reykjavík for one year in 2001.
