= 1993–94 UEFA Champions League group stage =

International football competition

Location of teams of the 1993–94 UEFA Champions League
Brown: Group A; Red: Group B

The 1993–94 UEFA Champions League group stage, originally branded as simply the 1993–94 UEFA Champions League, began on 24 November 1993 and ended on 13 April 1994. The eight teams were divided into two groups of four, and the teams in each group played against each other on a home-and-away basis, meaning that each team played a total of six group matches. For each win, teams were awarded two points, with one point awarded for each draw. At the end of the group stage, the two teams in each group with the most points advanced to the semi-finals of the 1993–94 UEFA Champions League.

== Teams ==
The eight winners of the second round advanced to the group stage. The eight teams were drawn into two groups of four. The draw was open, with no seedings or pots used.

Key to colours
Group winners and runners-up advanced to knockout stage

Group stage participants
Team	Coeff.
(Italy) Milan	3.408
(Spain) Barcelona	2.986
(Germany) Werder Bremen	2.848
(Belgium) Anderlecht	2.671
(France) Monaco	2.667
(Portugal) Porto	2.589
(Russia) Spartak Moscow	2.536
(Turkey) Galatasaray	2.227

Result of the draw
Group A	Group B
1. (Spain) Barcelona; 2. (France) Monaco; 3. (Russia) Spartak Moscow; 4. (Turkey) Galatasaray	1. (Germany) Werder Bremen; 2. (Belgium) Anderlecht; 3. (Italy) Milan; 4. (Portugal) Porto

== Groups ==
=== Group A ===
Pos	Team	Pld	W	D	L	GF	GA	GD	Pts	Qualification	BAR	MON	SPM	GAL
1	(Spain) Barcelona	6	4	2	0	13	3	+10	10	Advance to knockout stage	—	2–0	5–1	3–0
2	(France) Monaco	6	3	1	2	9	4	+5	7	Advance to knockout stage	0–1	—	4–1	3–0
3	(Russia) Spartak Moscow	6	1	3	2	6	12	−6	5		2–2	0–0	—	0–0
4	(Turkey) Galatasaray	6	0	2	4	1	10	−9	2		0–0	0–2	1–2	—

Source: UEFA
24 November 1993
20:30

Monaco (France)	4–1	(Russia) Spartak Moscow
Klinsmann 17'; Ikpeba 41'; Djorkaeff 62' (pen.); Thuram 89'	Report	Pisarev 49'

Stade Louis II, Monaco
Attendance: 16,000
Referee: Fabio Baldas (Italy)
24 November 1993
21:30

Galatasaray (Turkey)	0–0	(Spain) Barcelona
	Report

Ali Sami Yen Stadium, Istanbul
Attendance: 30,000
Referee: Frans Van Den Wijngaert (Belgium)

8 December 1993
20:30

Barcelona (Spain)	2–0	(France) Monaco
Begiristain 15', 26'	Report

Camp Nou, Barcelona
Attendance: 89,000
Referee: Kim Milton Nielsen (Denmark)
8 December 1993
20:00

Spartak Moscow (Russia)	0–0	(Turkey) Galatasaray
	Report

Luzhniki Stadium, Moscow
Attendance: 40,000
Referee: John Blankenstein (Netherlands)

2 March 1994
20:30

Monaco (France)	3–0	(Turkey) Galatasaray
Scifo 36'; Djorkaeff 40'; Klinsmann 52'	Report

Stade Louis II, Monaco
Attendance: 16,500
Referee: Hellmut Krug (Germany)
2 March 1994
20:00

Spartak Moscow (Russia)	2–2	(Spain) Barcelona
Rodionov 77'; Karpin 88'	Report	Stoichkov 11'; Romário 67'

Luzhniki Stadium, Moscow
Attendance: 61,000
Referee: Sándor Puhl (Hungary)

16 March 1994
21:30

Galatasaray (Turkey)	0–2	(France) Monaco
	Report	Scifo 54'; Gnako 90'

Ali Sami Yen Stadium, Istanbul
Attendance: 28,000
Referee: Leif Sundell (Sweden)
16 March 1994
20:30

Barcelona (Spain)	5–1	(Russia) Spartak Moscow
Stoichkov 33'; Amor 75'; Koeman 77', 80'; Romário 86' (pen.)	Report	Karpin 3'

Camp Nou, Barcelona
Attendance: 78,400
Referee: Serge Muhmenthaler (Switzerland)

30 March 1994
20:00

Spartak Moscow (Russia)	0–0	(France) Monaco
	Report

Luzhniki Stadium, Moscow
Attendance: 22,000
Referee: Piero Ceccarini (Italy)
30 March 1994
20:30

Barcelona (Spain)	3–0	(Turkey) Galatasaray
Amor 21'; Koeman 70' (pen.); Eusebio 77'	Report

Camp Nou, Barcelona
Attendance: 80,000
Referee: Leslie Mottram (Scotland)

13 April 1994
20:30

Monaco (France)	0–1	(Spain) Barcelona
	Report	Stoichkov 13'

Stade Louis II, Monaco
Attendance: 16,000
Referee: Ion Crăciunescu (Romania)
13 April 1994
21:30

Galatasaray (Turkey)	1–2	(Russia) Spartak Moscow
Cihat 86'	Report	Onopko 55'; Karpin 83'

Ali Sami Yen Stadium, Istanbul
Attendance: 22,000
Referee: Gerd Grabher (Austria)

=== Group B ===
Pos	Team	Pld	W	D	L	GF	GA	GD	Pts	Qualification	MIL	POR	BRM	AND
1	(Italy) Milan	6	2	4	0	6	2	+4	8	Advance to knockout stage	—	3–0	2–1	0–0
2	(Portugal) Porto	6	3	1	2	10	6	+4	7	Advance to knockout stage	0–0	—	3–2	2–0
3	(Germany) Werder Bremen	6	2	1	3	11	15	−4	5		1–1	0–5	—	5–3
4	(Belgium) Anderlecht	6	1	2	3	5	9	−4	4		0–0	1–0	1–2	—

Source: UEFA
24 November 1993
20:30

Anderlecht (Belgium)	0–0	(Italy) Milan
	Report

Constant Vanden Stock Stadium, Brussels
Attendance: 28,063
Referee: Vadim Zhuk (Belarus)
24 November 1993
20:30

Porto (Portugal)	3–2	(Germany) Werder Bremen
Domingos 7'; Rui Jorge 34'; Zé Carlos 82'	Report	Hobsch 85'; Rufer 86'

Estádio das Antas, Porto
Attendance: 35,000
Referee: David Elleray (England)

1 December 1993 (Note: The game was originally scheduled for 8 December, but ended up being brought forward by a week to allow Milan more time to prepare for the 1993 Intercontinental Cup.)
20:30

Milan (Italy)	3–0	(Portugal) Porto
Răducioiu 16'; Panucci 39'; Massaro 63'	Report

San Siro, Milan
Attendance: 31,915
Referee: Leif Sundell (Sweden)
8 December 1993
20:30

Werder Bremen (Germany)	5–3	(Belgium) Anderlecht
Rufer 66', 89'; Bratseth 72'; Hobsch 80'; Bode 83'	Report	Albert 16'; Boffin 18', 33'

Weserstadion, Bremen
Attendance: 29,000
Referee: Ion Crăciunescu (Romania)

2 March 1994
20:30

Milan (Italy)	2–1	(Germany) Werder Bremen
Maldini 48'; Savićević 68'	Report	Basler 54'

San Siro, Milan
Attendance: 41,239
Referee: Leslie Mottram (Scotland)
2 March 1994
20:30

Anderlecht (Belgium)	1–0	(Portugal) Porto
Nilis 88'	Report

Constant Vanden Stock Stadium, Brussels
Attendance: 17,000
Referee: Vassilios Nikakis (Greece)

16 March 1994
20:30

Werder Bremen (Germany)	1–1	(Italy) Milan
Rufer 52' (pen.)	Report	Savićević 74'

Weserstadion, Bremen
Attendance: 27,500
Referee: Kim Milton Nielsen (Denmark)
16 March 1994
20:30

Porto (Portugal)	2–0	(Belgium) Anderlecht
Drulović 9'; Secretário 90'	Report

Estádio das Antas, Porto
Attendance: 38,000
Referee: Václav Krondl (Czech Republic)

30 March 1994
20:30

Milan (Italy)	0–0	(Belgium) Anderlecht
	Report

San Siro, Milan
Attendance: 39,626
Referee: Joël Quiniou (France)
30 March 1994
20:30

Werder Bremen (Germany)	0–5	(Portugal) Porto
	Report	Rui Filipe 11'; Kostadinov 35'; Secretário 70'; Domingos 74'; Timofte 90' (pen.)

Weserstadion, Bremen
Attendance: 32,000
Referee: Manuel Díaz Vega (Spain)

13 April 1994
20:30

Porto (Portugal)	0–0	(Italy) Milan
	Report

Estádio das Antas, Porto
Attendance: 46,800
Referee: Sándor Puhl (Hungary)
13 April 1994
20:30

Anderlecht (Belgium)	1–2	(Germany) Werder Bremen
Bosman 45'	Report	Bode 33', 65'

Constant Vanden Stock Stadium, Brussels
Attendance: 13,000
Referee: Kurt Röthlisberger (Switzerland)
