= Florin Răducioiu =

Romanian footballer

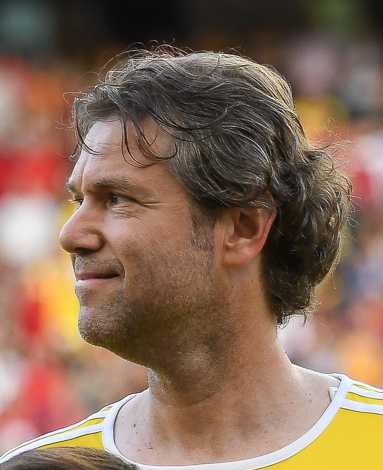
- Răducioiu in 2018

Personal information
- Full name: Florin Valeriu Răducioiu
- Date of birth: 17 March 1970 (age 56)
- Place of birth: Bucharest, Romania
- Height: 1.80 m (5 ft 11 in)
- Position: Striker

Youth career
- 1978–1986: Dinamo București

Senior career*
Years	Team	Apps	(Gls)
1986–1990	Dinamo București	76	(29)
1990–1991	Bari	30	(5)
1991–1992	Hellas Verona	30	(2)
1992–1993	Brescia	29	(13)
1993–1994	AC Milan	7	(2)
1994–1998	Espanyol	56	(19)
1996	→ West Ham United (loan)	11	(2)
1997–1998	→ VfB Stuttgart (loan)	19	(4)
1998–2000	Brescia	37	(5)
2000	Dinamo București	8	(1)
2001–2002	AS Monaco	12	(2)
2004	Créteil	9	(1)
Total		324	(85)

International career
1989–1990	Romania U21	9	(3)
1990–1996	Romania	40	(21)

Managerial career
- 2012–2013: Romania U15
- 2013–2014: Romania U16
- 2014: Romania U17
- * Club domestic league appearances and goals

Florin Valeriu Răducioiu (born 17 March 1970) is a Romanian football executive and former coach and player who played as a striker.

He is known as the first footballer to play and score at least one goal in each of the top five European leagues.

He played for Romania at the 1990 World Cup, the 1994 World Cup and Euro 1996.

== Club career ==
=== Dinamo București ===
Răducioiu, nicknamed Minunea blondă ("The Blonde Wonder"), was born on 17 March 1970 in Bucharest, Romania and began playing junior-level football in 1978 at local club Dinamo where he worked with Iosif Varga. Coach Mircea Lucescu gave 16-year old Răducioiu his Divizia A debut on 10 May 1986 in a 2–1 home victory against Politehnica Timișoara. His first achievement was playing five games and scoring one goal against Kuusysi Lahti in the 1988–89 European Cup Winners' Cup, reaching the quarter-finals where they were eliminated on the away goals rule after 1–1 on aggregate by Sampdoria.

In the following season, Dinamo won The Double with Răducioiu playing 24 Divizia A games in which he scored 14 goals, including one in a 2–2 draw against rivals Steaua București. He also scored a hat-trick in the 6–4 victory against them in the Cupa României final. Additionally, he appeared in eight matches in the 1989–90 European Cup Winners' Cup campaign, scoring once against Panathinaikos and three times against Partizan Belgrade, as the team reached the semi-finals where they were eliminated 2–0 on aggregate by Anderlecht. In the 85th minute of the second leg in the semi-final against Anderlecht, Răducioiu received a red card after fighting with an opponent and quarreled with the referee, Lucescu giving him a slap for that. However, he appreciated the coach, praising him years later after he ended his career:"He was my mentor, teacher, everything! Without him, I would never have become a footballer. He believed in me and gave me the opportunity to play. He showed me what football is all about, but I also learned a lot of other things."

=== Bari ===
In the summer of 1990, Italian club Bari transferred Răducioiu after paying Dinamo $3 million. He made his Serie A debut on 9 September, as coach Gaetano Salvemini used him as a starter in a 2–0 away loss to Atalanta. One week later he netted his first goal in a 2–1 home victory against Torino. Until the end of the season he scored four more times, netting in two 1–1 draws against Lazio Roma and Sampdoria, then opening the score in a 2–0 win over Pisa and his last goal came in a 5–1 loss to Inter Milan.

=== Hellas Verona ===
In 1991, he joined Hellas Verona, making his league debut on 1 September under coach Eugenio Fascetti who used him the entire match in a 1–0 home loss to AS Roma. He scored his first goal for The Mastiffs on 16 November in a 2–1 victory against Genoa. Subsequently, he was unable to score until 11 April 1992 in a 2–1 loss to Torino. These were his only goals in his 30 appearances during this season in which the team was relegated. Years later after ending his career, Răducioiu claimed that his poor performances during this period were influenced by the love relationship he had with fashion model Eugenia "Janine" Ștefan: "I had a nightmare season at Verona, 1991–92. I had fallen head over heels in love with Janine, a famous fashion model of those years. My whole being was connected during that period to this girl (...) I had fallen at matches, during training, the supporters attacked us when we were coming from away games, they also attacked me once. We relegated that season, the fans rightly blamed me, and years later I publicly apologized for my disastrous year's performances".

=== Brescia ===
Răducioiu went to play for the 1992–93 season at Mircea Lucescu's "Brescia Romena", as around that period, his fellow Romanians Gheorghe Hagi, Ioan Sabău, Dorin Mateuț and Dănuț Lupu also played for the club. He made his debut on 5 September 1992 in a 0–0 draw against Napoli, two weeks later scoring his first goal in a 1–0 win over Pescara, by the end of the year managing a brace in a 2–2 draw against Genoa. In the second half of the season he scored goals in victories over Napoli and Juventus, and in May 1993 he managed two doubles, first in the 2–0 success over Atalanta and then in the 2–2 draw against Udinese. He netted a total of 13 goals, but the team was relegated to Serie B.

=== AC Milan ===
After three seasons in Serie A, Răducioiu joined AC Milan, which paid Brescia €2.75 million for his transfer. His first appearance was in the 1993 Supercoppa Italiana when coach Fabio Capello sent him at half-time to replace Marco Simone who had scored the only goal in the victory against Torino. He made his Serie A debut for The Devil on 12 September 1993, closing the score in a 2–0 home win against Atalanta, and on 4 December he netted the only goal in a home victory over Torino. On 11 December, he was used by Capello as a starter in the 3–2 loss to São Paulo in the 1993 Intercontinental Cup. Răducioiu also played two games in the Champions League group stage, scoring once in a 3–0 win over Porto which was the 300th goal of the club in European competitions. In his single season with Milan he scored only four goals in 14 appearances across all competitions, having to compete for a place in the offence with players such as Jean-Pierre Papin, Daniele Massaro, Dejan Savićević and Marco Simone, but still managed to win the league title and the Champions League. He would describe his opportunity to play for Milan as "a dream come true".

=== Espanyol and loans ===
In 1994, Răducioiu went in Spain to play for Espanyol, which paid Milan €2.4 million for his transfer. He made his Primera División debut under coach José Antonio Camacho on 4 September, opening the score in a 4–2 home win over Real Oviedo. One week later he scored again in a 4–0 away victory against Real Valladolid, managing to score nine goals until the end of the season, including a brace in a 2–0 win over Atlético Madrid. For the way he played in 1994, Răducioiu was placed second in the ranking for the Romanian Footballer of the Year award, only behind Gheorghe Hagi. He started the following season strong by scoring a brace in the first round and one goal in the second in victories against Salamanca and Tenerife respectively, but scored only two more goals in wins against Real Sociedad and Real Oviedo until the end of it.

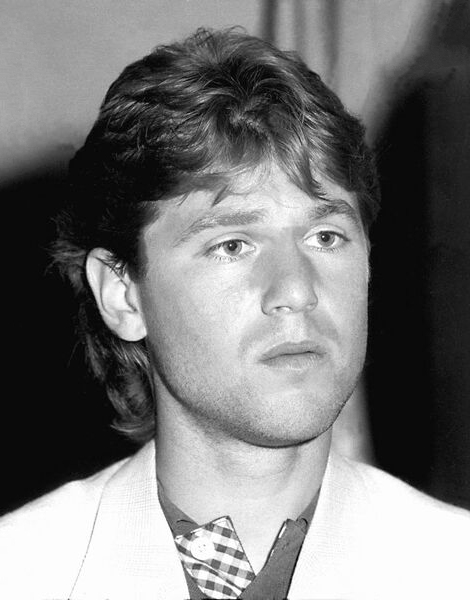
Răducioiu in 1995

Having scored his country's only goal in Euro 1996, manager Harry Redknapp signed him for West Ham United in 1996. There, he was teammates with compatriot Ilie Dumitrescu. He made his Premier League debut on 24 August when he replaced Marc Rieper in the 39th minute of a 2–1 home win over Southampton. Most famously, he scored a goal in a 2–2 draw against Manchester United after being criticized by Redknapp for going shopping with his wife at Harvey Nichols on a previous match day, a claim Răducioiu denied. Despite showing promise, he never adapted to the pace and competitive nature of the English game, making no real impact at Upton Park. He scored three goals during his spell with The Hammers, in addition to his goal against Manchester United, he scored against Stockport County in the League Cup and Sunderland in the league. Having fallen out with manager Redknapp at the East London club, he was transferred back to Espanyol after his short underachieving spell, having scored just two goals in the Premier League.

In the second half of the 1996–97 season, Răducioiu scored two doubles for Espanyol, one in a loss to Sporting Gijón and the other in a 2–0 win over Barcelona in the Derbi Barceloní.

In the summer of 1997 he joined VfB Stuttgart. Răducioiu made his Bundesliga debut on 23 August when coach Joachim Löw sent him at half-time to replace Jonathan Akpoborie in a 3–1 away win against MSV Duisburg where he closed the score. He played for them in three games in the early stages of the 1997–98 UEFA Cup Winners' Cup campaign in which Stuttgart reached the final.

=== Comebacks to Brescia and Dinamo ===
In 1998, Răducioiu made a comeback at Brescia, this time playing for two years in Serie B. Afterwards he returned to his country at Dinamo, where he stayed only for the first half of the 2000–01 season. Răducioiu scored his only goal during this second spell with The Red Dogs in a 3–2 loss to Petrolul Ploiești. He made his last Divizia A appearance on 24 November 2000 in a 3–2 win over Astra Ploiești, totaling 84 matches with 30 goals in the competition.

=== AS Monaco and Créteil ===
In early 2001, Răducioiu went to play for AS Monaco, making his Ligue 1 debut on 13 January against Sedan when coach Claude Puel introduced him in the 66th minute to replace the only scorer of the game, Shabani Nonda. He netted for the first time on 3 February in a 6–1 victory over Metz, then on 17 March he opened the score in a 4–3 home win against Troyes.

He retired in 2004, after a short stint with French Ligue 2 side Créteil.

Răducioiu is the first professional footballer who played and also scored in the top five European leagues (England, Spain, Germany, Italy and France).

== International career ==
=== Early years and 1990 World Cup ===
Răducioiu played 40 games and scored 21 goals for Romania, making his debut on 25 April 1990 under coach Emerich Jenei in a 4–1 friendly win against Israel, being on the field for the first 58 minutes before he was replaced with Gabi Balint.

Răducioiu was taken by Jenei to be part of the 1990 World Cup squad where he made his debut in the 2–1 victory against the Soviet Union at Stadio San Nicola in Bari, aged 20. Appearing in three games, he finished the tournament without scoring and Romania fell to the Republic of Ireland in the round of 16, in a penalty shootout.

Răducioiu scored his first goal in a 6–0 victory over San Marino in the Euro 1992 qualifiers, only to double his account in the next game in San Marino, as the Romanians won 3–1.

=== 1994 World Cup ===
The 1994 World Cup qualifiers were very successful for Răducioiu, starting with two goals against Czechoslovakia in Košice, even though Romania lost 5–2. An even greater success for Răducioiu would come three months later when in Toftir, he managed to score all four of Romania's goals against the Faroe Islands. Răducioiu also scored a penalty kick and provided an assist for Ilie Dumitrescu in a 2–1 victory against Belgium. In the last group game of the qualifiers, he scored a goal against Wales, finishing a nice team effort after a pass from Ilie Dumitrescu. This late goal, coming in the 83rd minute, earned Romania a 2–1 win and thus the mathematical qualification to the 1994 World Cup. This match is considered by Romanian journalists as the birth of Romania's "Golden Generation". With nine goals scored, Răducioiu was the top-scorer of the 1994 World Cup qualifiers in the UEFA zone.

In the World Cup finals, Răducioiu scored two goals in the victory against Colombia during the group stage. Coach Anghel Iordănescu could not use him in the historical victory against Argentina in the round of 16 as he was suspended after receiving two yellow cards in the group stage. In the quarterfinal against Sweden, he first equalized Sweden's 0–1 lead in the 88th minute of regular time, taking the game to extra time, then put Romania ahead 2–1 in the first period. Shortly thereafter, Sweden's Stefan Schwarz was sent off after his second yellow card, but even with ten men, Kennet Andersson tied the game in the 115th minute, leading to a shootout. Răducioiu scored Romania's first penalty attempt after Sweden had missed its first, but Romania was eliminated after missing two attempts out of six. Still, Răducioiu's four tournament goals helped Romania to its most successful World Cup campaign ever.

On 11 July 1994, Răducioiu was named Honorary Citizen of Bucharest for "representing Romania brilliantly at the 1994 World Cup in the United States of America".

=== Euro 1996 ===
During the successful Euro 1996 qualifiers he scored five goals, including a hat-trick against Azerbaijan, being his side's top-scorer. He was used by Iordănescu in all three matches in the final tournament, which was unsuccessful as they lost to France, Bulgaria and Spain. Răducioiu netted the nation's only goal after a pass from Ovidiu Stîngă in the 2–1 loss to the Spanish side.

=== Retirement ===
Afterwards, Răducioiu decided to retire from the national team even though he was only 26 years old, a decision he would regret, years later saying in an interview: "Disappointed with the European Championship... I felt that I could no longer be useful to the national team. What nonsense I could think then! I felt like I was probably losing my place in the team and... It was probably wrong, for sure!"

For representing his country at two final tournaments, Răducioiu was decorated by President of Romania Traian Băsescu on 25 March 2008 with the Ordinul "Meritul Sportiv" – (The Medal "The Sportive Merit") class III.

== After retirement ==
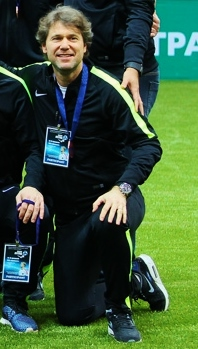
Răducioiu in 2015

In 2005, he had a short spell as a sports agent, then in 2007 he worked as a sporting director for Dinamo București.

In 2012, he was hired by the Romanian Football Federation to be the head coach of Romania's under-15 national team, in the following years working at Romania U16 and Romania U17, teaching players such as Ianis Hagi and Florinel Coman.

In 2017, Răducioiu was hired by Regal Sport București as a technical director, working there with a 15-year-old Radu Drăgușin. In 2022, he worked as a team manager for a few months at Dinamo București.

== Personal life ==
In the early 1990s, Răducioiu dated Romanian fashion model and designer Janine Ștefan. In 1993, he began a relationship with Astrid, an Italian originally from Brescia. They married in 1994 and have two sons, Andrea (born 1996) and Alessandro (born 1998). The couple divorced in 2018.

== Career statistics ==
=== International ===
Appearances and goals by national team and year.
National team	Year	Apps	Goals
Romania	1990	10	1
Romania	1991	5	1
Romania	1992	2	1
Romania	1993	4	8
Romania	1994	12	5
Romania	1995	3	4
Romania	1996	4	1
Total		40	21

Scores and results list Romania's goal tally first, score column indicates score after each Răducioiu goal.

List of international goals scored by Florin Răducioiu
No.	Date	Venue	Opponent	Score	Result	Competition
1	5 December 1990	Stadionul Naţional, Bucharest, Romania	San Marino	3–0	6–0	UEFA Euro 1992 qualifying
2	27 March 1991	Stadio Olimpico, Serravalle, San Marino	San Marino	2–1	3–1	UEFA Euro 1992 qualifying
3	29 November 1992	Neo GSZ Stadium, Larnaca, Cyprus	Cyprus	2–0	4–1	1994 FIFA World Cup qualification
4	2 June 1993	Všešportový areál, Košice, Slovakia	Czechoslovakia	1–1	2–5	1994 FIFA World Cup qualification
5	2 June 1993	Všešportový areál, Košice, Slovakia	Czechoslovakia	2–2	2–5	1994 FIFA World Cup qualification
6	8 September 1993	Svangaskarð, Toftir, Faroe Islands	Faroe Islands	1–0	4–0	1994 FIFA World Cup qualification
7	8 September 1993	Svangaskarð, Toftir, Faroe Islands	Faroe Islands	2–0	4–0	1994 FIFA World Cup qualification
8	8 September 1993	Svangaskarð, Toftir, Faroe Islands	Faroe Islands	3–0	4–0	1994 FIFA World Cup qualification
9	8 September 1993	Svangaskarð, Toftir, Faroe Islands	Faroe Islands	4–0	4–0	1994 FIFA World Cup qualification
10	13 October 1993	Stadionul Steaua, Bucharest, Romania	Belgium	1–0	2–1	1994 FIFA World Cup qualification
11	17 November 1993	National Stadium, Cardiff, Wales	Wales	2–1	2–1	1994 FIFA World Cup qualification
12	18 June 1994	Rose Bowl, Pasadena, United States	Colombia	1–0	3–1	1994 FIFA World Cup
13	18 June 1994	Rose Bowl, Pasadena, United States	Colombia	3–1	3–1	1994 FIFA World Cup
14	10 July 1994	Stanford Stadium, Stanford, United States	Sweden	1–1	2–2	1994 FIFA World Cup
15	10 July 1994	Stanford Stadium, Stanford, United States	Sweden	2–1	2–2	1994 FIFA World Cup
16	7 September 1994	Stadionul Steaua, Bucharest, Romania	Azerbaijan	3–0	3–0	UEFA Euro 1996 qualifying
17	29 March 1995	Stadionul Steaua, Bucharest, Romania	Poland	1–1	2–1	UEFA Euro 1996 Qualifying
18	26 April 1995	Hüseyin Avni Aker Stadium, Trabzon, Turkey	Azerbaijan	1–0	4–1	UEFA Euro 1996 Qualifying
19	26 April 1995	Hüseyin Avni Aker Stadium, Trabzon, Turkey	Azerbaijan	3–1	4–1	UEFA Euro 1996 Qualifying
20	26 April 1995	Hüseyin Avni Aker Stadium, Trabzon, Turkey	Azerbaijan	4–1	4–1	UEFA Euro 1996 Qualifying
21	18 June 1996	Elland Road, Leeds, England	Spain	1–1	1–2	UEFA Euro 1996

== Honours ==
Dinamo București

- Divizia A: 1989–90
- Cupa României: 1985–86, 1989–90

AC Milan

- Serie A: 1993–94
- Supercoppa Italiana: 1993
- Champions League: 1993–94
- Intercontinental Cup runner-up: 1993

VfB Stuttgart

- UEFA Cup Winners' Cup runner-up: 1997–98

Individual

- Romanian Footballer of the Year runner-up: 1994, (third place): 1993
