= 1993–94 UEFA Champions League knockout stage =

European football competition stage

The 1993–94 UEFA Champions League knockout stage began on 27 April with the semi-finals and ended on 18 May 1994 with the final at the Olympic Stadium in Athens, Greece, to decide the champions of the 1993–94 UEFA Champions League. A total of four teams competed in the knockout stage.

Times are CEST (UTC+2), as listed by UEFA (local times, if different, are in parentheses).

== Qualified teams ==
The knockout stage involved the four teams which qualified as winners and runners-up of both groups in the group stage.

Group	Winners (home in semi-final match)	Runners-up (away in semi-final match)
A	(Spain) Barcelona	(France) Monaco
B	(Italy) Milan	(Portugal) Porto

== Format ==
Each tie in the knockout stage was played in a single match. For the semi-finals, the group winners played at home against the runner-up of the other group. If the score was level at the end of normal time, extra time would be played, followed by a penalty shoot-out if the score was still level.

== Schedule ==
The schedule was as follows.

Round	Date
Semi-finals	27 April 1994
Final	18 May 1994 at Olympic Stadium, Athens

== Bracket ==
Semi-finals
27 April – Milan
(Italy) Milan	3
(France) Monaco	0
27 April – Barcelona
(Spain) Barcelona	3
(Portugal) Porto	0

Final
18 May – Athens
(Italy) Milan	4
(Spain) Barcelona	0

== Semi-finals ==
=== Summary ===
The semi-finals were played on 27 April 1994.

Home team	Score	Away team
Milan (Italy)	3–0	(France) Monaco
Barcelona (Spain)	3–0	(Portugal) Porto

=== Matches ===
27 April 1994
20:30

Milan (Italy)	3–0	(France) Monaco
Desailly 14'; Albertini 48'; Massaro 65'	Report

San Siro, Milan
Attendance: 78,650
Referee: Bernd Heynemann (Germany)

27 April 1994
20:30

Barcelona (Spain)	3–0	(Portugal) Porto
Stoichkov 10', 35'; Koeman 73'	Report

Camp Nou, Barcelona
Attendance: 98,000
Referee: Vadim Zhuk (Belarus)

== Final ==
The final was played on 18 May 1994 at the Olympic Stadium in Athens.

18 May 1994
20:15 (21:15 UTC+3)

Milan (Italy)	4–0	(Spain) Barcelona
Massaro 22', 45+2'; Savićević 47'; Desailly 58'	Report

Olympic Stadium, Athens
Attendance: 70,000
Referee: Philip Don (England)
