= 1993–94 UEFA Champions League =

European football tournament

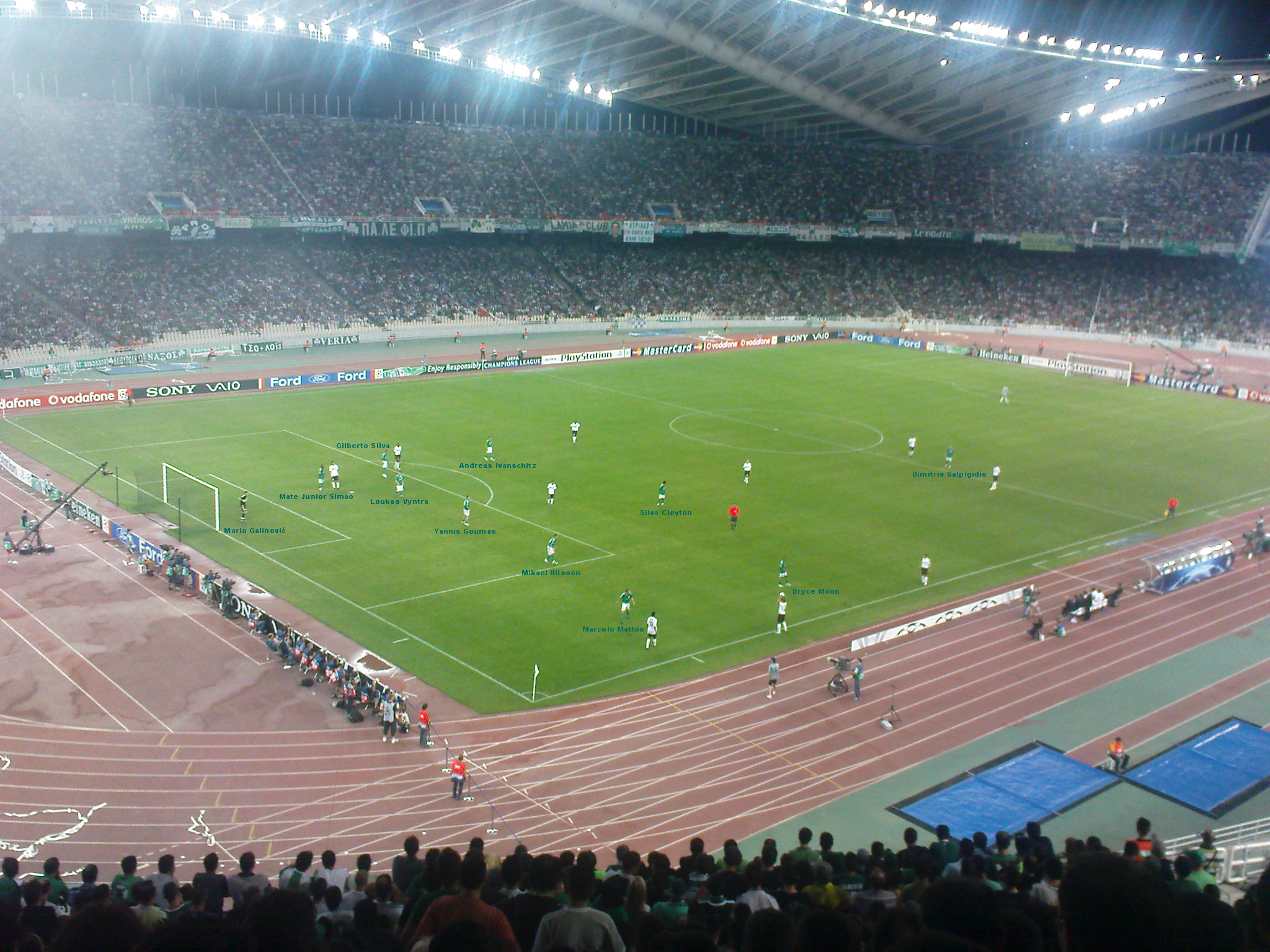
- The Olympic Stadium in Athens hosted the final.

Tournament details
- Dates: Qualifying: 18 August – 1 September 1993; Competition proper: 15 September 1993 – 18 May 1994
- Teams: Competition proper: 32; Total: 42

Final positions
- Champions: (Italy) Milan (5th title)
- Runners-up: (Spain) Barcelona

Tournament statistics
- Matches played: 75
- Goals scored: 217 (2.89 per match)
- Attendance: 2,082,730 (27,770 per match)
- Top scorer(s): Ronald Koeman (Barcelona); Wynton Rufer (Werder Bremen); 8 goals each

The 1993–94 UEFA Champions League, originally known as the 1993–94 European Cup, was the 39th season of the UEFA Champions League, UEFA's premier club football tournament, and the second season with the UEFA Champions League logo (it was adopted in the group stage and semi-finals, the rest of the tournament continued to be called "European Champion Clubs' Cup" or "European Cup"). The competition was won by Italian club Milan, their fifth title, beating Spanish club Barcelona 4–0 in the final. Marseille were the defending champions, but were not allowed to enter the competition due their involvement in a match-fixing scandal in Division 1 the season prior. This saw them stripped of their league title and demoted to Division 2 at the end of 1993–94. This was the first and only time when the defending champions did not participate in the following season of the competition. Third-placed Monaco took the vacated French berth (second-placed Paris Saint-Germain, who refused the defaulted French title, competed in the Cup Winners' Cup instead as Coupe de France winners).

There were changes made to the UEFA Champions League's format from the previous year. After two seasons, with the groups, it introduced one legged semi-finals taking place after the group stage, meaning the two sides qualified from each group as group winners playing the semi-finals at home.

This edition was marked by the absence of Yugoslav participants because Yugoslavia was under UN economic sanctions. Yugoslav participants were frequently present in advanced stages of the competition with Red Star Belgrade having won the European Cup in 1991 and finished second in the group the following season. Partizan were to represent Yugoslavia in this edition, but were not allowed to participate. Meanwhile, Croatia, Belarus, Moldova, Georgia and Wales entered their champions for the first time in this edition.

== Teams ==
In total, 42 national champions participated in 1993–94 UEFA Champions League season. The 20 lowest-ranked champions according to the 1993 club seeding coefficients entered in the preliminary round, while the 22 best-ranked champions entered in the first round.

=== Distribution ===
| Round | Teams entering in this round | Teams advancing from the previous round |
|---|---|---|
| Preliminary round (20 teams) | 20 champions ranked 23–42 by seeding coefficient | |
| First round (32 teams) | 22 champions ranked 1–22 by seeding coefficient (originally including title holders) | 10 winners from the qualifying round |
| Second round (16 teams) | | 16 winners from the first round |
| Group stage (8 teams) | | 8 winners from the second round |
| Knockout stage (4 teams) | | 2 group winners from the group stage; 2 group runners-up from the group stage |

Since the title holders (Marseille) originally qualified via their domestic league, the title holder spot was vacated and the following changes to the default access list were made:

- The champions ranked 21st and 22nd (Dinamo Minsk and Levski Sofia) were promoted from the preliminary round to the first round.

=== Ranking ===
Location of teams of the 1993–94 UEFA Champions League.
Purple: Eliminated in the preliminary round; Yellow: Eliminated in the first round; Orange: Eliminated in the second round; Red: Qualified for group stage.

The teams were ranked according to their 1993 UEFA seeding coefficients, which took into account performances in European competitions from 1988–89 to 1992–93. Each club and national association had a seeding coefficient calculated (total points divided by total matches), with both values added together to determine the club's final coefficient. This ranking then determined the round each team would enter.

Qualified teams for 1993–94 UEFA Champions League (by ranking)
| Rank | Association | Team | Coeff. |
First round
| 6 | France | Monaco (3rd) | 2.667 |
| 1 | Italy | Milan (1st) | 3.408 |
| 2 | Spain | Barcelona (1st) | 2.986 |
| 3 | England | Manchester United (1st) | 2.910 |
| 4 | Germany | Werder Bremen (1st) | 2.848 |
| 5 | Belgium | Anderlecht (1st) | 2.671 |
| 7 | Portugal | Porto (1st) | 2.589 |
| 8 | Russia | Spartak Moscow (1st) | 2.536 |
| 9 | Scotland | Rangers (1st) | 2.504 |
| 10 | Romania | Steaua București (1st) | 2.366 |
| 11 | Netherlands | Feyenoord (1st) | 2.325 |
| 12 | Turkey | Galatasaray (1st) | 2.227 |
| 13 | Czechoslovakia | Sparta Prague (1st) | 2.205 |
| 14 | Poland | Lech Poznań (1st) | 2.089 |
| 15 | Austria | Austria Wien (1st) | 2.076 |
| 16 | Denmark | Copenhagen (1st) | 2.053 |
| 17 | Greece | AEK Athens (1st) | 1.994 |
| 18 | Sweden | AIK (1st) | 1.954 |
| 19 | Ukraine | Dynamo Kyiv (1st) | 1.692 |
| 20 | Hungary | Kispest Honvéd (1st) | 1.573 |
| 21 | Belarus | Dinamo Minsk (1st) | 1.250 |
| 22 | Bulgaria | Levski Sofia (1st) | 1.125 |
Preliminary round
| 23 | Norway | Rosenborg (1st) | 0.971 |
| 24 | Switzerland | Aarau (1st) | 0.939 |
| 25 | Finland | HJK (1st) | 0.855 |
| 26 | Northern Ireland | Linfield (1st) | 0.833 |
| 27 | Croatia | Croatia Zagreb (1st) | 0.750 |
| 28 | Iceland | ÍA (1st) | 0.656 |
| 29 | Albania | Partizani (1st) | 0.634 |
| 30 | Luxembourg | Avenir Beggen (1st) | 0.633 |
| 31 | Cyprus | Omonia (1st) | 0.623 |
| 32 | Wales | Cwmbrân Town (1st) | 0.571 |
| 33 | Malta | Floriana (1st) | 0.563 |
| 34 | Republic of Ireland | Cork City (1st) | 0.500 |
| 34 | Latvia | Skonto (1st) | 0.500 |
| 36 | Faroe Islands | B68 (1st) | 0.000 |
| 36 | Israel | Beitar Jerusalem (1st) | 0.000 |
| 36 | Georgia | Dinamo Tbilisi (1st) | 0.000 |
| 36 | Lithuania | Ekranas (1st) | 0.000 |
| 36 | Estonia | Norma Tallinn (1st) | 0.000 |
| 36 | Slovenia | Olimpija Ljubljana (1st) | 0.000 |
| 36 | Moldova | Zimbru Chișinău (1st) | 0.000 |

Associations without a participating team
- Armenia
- FR Yugoslavia
- Liechtenstein
- San Marino

Notes

1. France (FRA): Champions League title holders Marseille (who also finished 1st in 1992–93 French Division 1) were disqualified from the competition by the UEFA Executive Committee on 6 September 1993 due to their involvement in a match-fixing scandal in Division 1. They were subsequently stripped of their league title and demoted to Division 2 at the end of the 1993–94 season. Third-placed Monaco took the vacated French berth on 8 September since league runners-up Paris Saint-Germain refused to take the title from Marseille on commercial grounds, instead participating in the 1993–94 European Cup Winners' Cup as 1992–93 Coupe de France winners. Therefore, in the access list, Monaco effectively took the spot of Marseille (who were ranked 2nd with a coefficient of 3.145, but were automatically top as title holders).
2. Czech Republic (CZE): Sparta Prague qualified as winners of Czechoslovakia domestic league, but represented its successor association Czech Republic.
3. FR Yugoslavia (YUG): 1992–93 First League of FR Yugoslavia champions Partizan not admitted as a result of UN economic sanctions imposed on Yugoslavia.

== Round and draw dates ==
The schedule of the competition was as follows. All draws were held in Geneva, Switzerland.

| Phase | Round | Draw date | First leg | Second leg |
|---|---|---|---|---|
| Qualifying round | | 14 July 1993 | 18 August 1993 | 1 September 1993 |
| First round | | 14 July 1993 | 15 September 1993 | 29 September 1993 |
| Second round | | 1 October 1993 | 20 October 1993 | 3 November 1993 |
| Group stage | Matchday 1 | 5 November 1993 | 24 November 1993 | |
| Group stage | Matchday 2 | 5 November 1993 | 8 December 1993 | |
| Group stage | Matchday 3 | 5 November 1993 | 2 March 1994 | |
| Group stage | Matchday 4 | 5 November 1993 | 16 March 1994 | |
| Group stage | Matchday 5 | 5 November 1993 | 30 March 1994 | |
| Group stage | Matchday 6 | 5 November 1993 | 13 April 1994 | |
| Knockout phase | Semi-finals | 5 November 1993 | 27 April 1994 | |
| Knockout phase | Final | 5 November 1993 | 18 May 1994 at Olympic Stadium, Athens | |

== Preliminary round ==
The first legs were played on 18 and 22 August, and the second legs on 1 September 1993.

| Team 1 | Agg. | Team 2 | 1st leg | 2nd leg |
|---|---|---|---|---|
| HJK (Finland) | 2–1 | (Estonia) Norma Tallinn | 1–1 | 1–0 |
| Ekranas (Lithuania) | 0–2 | (Malta) Floriana | 0–1 | 0–1 |
| B68 (Faroe Islands) | 0–11 | Croatia Zagreb | 0–5 | 0–6 |
| Skonto (Latvia) | 1–1 (11–10 p) | (Slovenia) Olimpija Ljubljana | 0–1 | 1–0 (a.e.t.) |
| Cwmbrân Town (Wales) | 4–4 (a) | (Republic of Ireland) Cork City | 3–2 | 1–2 |
| Dinamo Tbilisi (Georgia (country)) | w/o (Note: Linfield were awarded a walkover victory after Dinamo Tbilisi were banned for an attempt to bribe the referee in the first leg.) | (Northern Ireland) Linfield | 2–1 | 1–1 |
| Avenir Beggen (Luxembourg) | 0–3 | (Norway) Rosenborg | 0–2 | 0–1 |
| Partizani (Albania) | 0–3 | (Iceland) ÍA | 0–0 | 0–3 |
| Omonia (Cyprus) | 2–3 | (Switzerland) Aarau | 2–1 | 0–2 |
| Zimbru Chișinău (Moldova) | 1–3 | (Israel) Beitar Jerusalem | 1–1 | 0–2 |

== First round ==
The first legs were played on 15 and 16 September, and the second legs on 28 and 29 September 1993.

| Team 1 | Agg. | Team 2 | 1st leg | 2nd leg |
|---|---|---|---|---|
| Porto (Portugal) | 2–0 | (Malta) Floriana | 2–0 | 0–0 |
| ÍA (Iceland) | 1–3 | (Netherlands) Feyenoord | 1–0 | 0–3 |
| Monaco (France) | 2–1 | (Greece) AEK Athens | 1–0 | 1–1 |
| Steaua București (Romania) | 4–4 (a) | Croatia Zagreb | 1–2 | 3–2 |
| Rangers (Scotland) | 4–4 (a) | (Bulgaria) Levski Sofia | 3–2 | 1–2 |
| Werder Bremen (Germany) | 6–3 | (Belarus) Dinamo Minsk | 5–2 | 1–1 |
| Linfield (Northern Ireland) | 3–4 | (Denmark) Copenhagen | 3–0 | 0–4 (a.e.t.) |
| Aarau (Switzerland) | 0–1 | (Italy) Milan | 0–1 | 0–0 |
| AIK (Sweden) | 1–2 | (Czech Republic) Sparta Prague | 1–0 | 0–2 |
| HJK (Finland) | 0–6 | (Belgium) Anderlecht | 0–3 | 0–3 |
| Kispest Honvéd (Hungary) | 3–5 | (England) Manchester United | 2–3 | 1–2 |
| Galatasaray (Turkey) | 3–1 | (Republic of Ireland) Cork City | 2–1 | 1–0 |
| Lech Poznań (Poland) | 7–2 | (Israel) Beitar Jerusalem | 3–0 | 4–2 |
| Skonto (Latvia) | 0–9 | (Russia) Spartak Moscow | 0–5 | 0–4 |
| Dynamo Kyiv (Ukraine) | 4–5 | (Spain) Barcelona | 3–1 | 1–4 |
| Rosenborg (Norway) | 4–5 | Austria Wien | 3–1 | 1–4 |

== Second round ==
The first legs were played on 20 October, and the second legs on 3 November 1993.

| Team 1 | Agg. | Team 2 | 1st leg | 2nd leg |
|---|---|---|---|---|
| Porto (Portugal) | 1–0 | (Netherlands) Feyenoord | 1–0 | 0–0 |
| Monaco (France) | 4–2 | (Romania) Steaua București | 4–1 | 0–1 |
| Levski Sofia (Bulgaria) | 2–3 | (Germany) Werder Bremen | 2–2 | 0–1 |
| Copenhagen (Denmark) | 0–7 | (Italy) Milan | 0–6 | 0–1 |
| Sparta Prague (Czech Republic) | 2–5 | (Belgium) Anderlecht | 0–1 | 2–4 |
| Manchester United (England) | 3–3 (a) | (Turkey) Galatasaray | 3–3 | 0–0 |
| Lech Poznań (Poland) | 2–7 | (Russia) Spartak Moscow | 1–5 | 1–2 |
| Barcelona (Spain) | 5–1 | Austria Wien | 3–0 | 2–1 |

== Group stage ==
Location of teams of the 1993–94 UEFA Champions League.
Brown: Group A; Red: Group B;

The group stage began on 24 November 1993 and ended on 13 April 1994. The eight teams were divided into two groups of four, and the teams in each group played against each other on a home-and-away basis, meaning that each team played a total of six group matches. For each win, teams were awarded two points, with one point awarded for each draw. At the end of the group stage, the two teams in each group with the most points advanced to the semi-finals.

All teams except Milan and Porto made their group stage debuts. Two of these teams (Barcelona and Anderlecht) had previously contested the 1991–92 group stage, the only season of the European Cup to adopt such a format.

=== Group A ===
| Pos | Team | Pld | W | D | L | GF | GA | GD | Pts | Qualification | BAR | MON | SPM | GAL |
|---|---|---|---|---|---|---|---|---|---|---|---|---|---|---|
| 1 | (Spain) Barcelona | 6 | 4 | 2 | 0 | 13 | 3 | +10 | 10 | Advance to knockout stage | — | 2–0 | 5–1 | 3–0 |
| 2 | (France) Monaco | 6 | 3 | 1 | 2 | 9 | 4 | +5 | 7 | Advance to knockout stage | 0–1 | — | 4–1 | 3–0 |
| 3 | (Russia) Spartak Moscow | 6 | 1 | 3 | 2 | 6 | 12 | −6 | 5 | | 2–2 | 0–0 | — | 0–0 |
| 4 | (Turkey) Galatasaray | 6 | 0 | 2 | 4 | 1 | 10 | −9 | 2 | | 0–0 | 0–2 | 1–2 | — |

Source: UEFA

=== Group B ===
| Pos | Team | Pld | W | D | L | GF | GA | GD | Pts | Qualification | MIL | POR | BRM | AND |
|---|---|---|---|---|---|---|---|---|---|---|---|---|---|---|
| 1 | (Italy) Milan | 6 | 2 | 4 | 0 | 6 | 2 | +4 | 8 | Advance to knockout stage | — | 3–0 | 2–1 | 0–0 |
| 2 | (Portugal) Porto | 6 | 3 | 1 | 2 | 10 | 6 | +4 | 7 | Advance to knockout stage | 0–0 | — | 3–2 | 2–0 |
| 3 | (Germany) Werder Bremen | 6 | 2 | 1 | 3 | 11 | 15 | −4 | 5 | | 1–1 | 0–5 | — | 5–3 |
| 4 | (Belgium) Anderlecht | 6 | 1 | 2 | 3 | 5 | 9 | −4 | 4 | | 0–0 | 1–0 | 1–2 | — |

Source: UEFA

== Knockout stage ==
=== Bracket ===
Semi-finals
27 April – Milan
(Italy) Milan | 3
(France) Monaco | 0
27 April – Barcelona
(Spain) Barcelona | 3
(Portugal) Porto | 0

Final
18 May – Athens
(Italy) Milan | 4
(Spain) Barcelona | 0

=== Semi-finals ===
The semi-finals were played on 27 April 1994.

| Home team | Score | Away team |
|---|---|---|
| Milan (Italy) | 3–0 | (France) Monaco |
| Barcelona (Spain) | 3–0 | (Portugal) Porto |

=== Final ===
The final was played on 18 May 1994 at the Olympic Stadium in Athens.

18 May 1994
21:15 UTC+3

| Milan (Italy) | 4–0 | (Spain) Barcelona |
|---|---|---|
| Massaro 22', 45+2'; Savićević 47'; Desailly 58' | Report |

Olympic Stadium, Athens
Attendance: 70,000
Referee: Philip Don (England)

== Top goalscorers ==
The top scorers from the 1993–94 UEFA Champions League (excluding preliminary round) are as follows:

| Rank | Name | Team | Goals |
|---|---|---|---|
| 1 | (Netherlands) Ronald Koeman | (Spain) Barcelona | 8 |
| 1 | (New Zealand) Wynton Rufer | (Germany) Werder Bremen | 8 |
| 3 | (Belgium) Luc Nilis | (Belgium) Anderlecht | 7 |
| 3 | (Bulgaria) Hristo Stoichkov | (Spain) Barcelona | 7 |
| 5 | (Germany) Bernd Hobsch | (Germany) Werder Bremen | 5 |
| 5 | (Russia) Valery Karpin | (Russia) Spartak Moscow | 5 |
| 7 | (Germany) Marco Bode | (Germany) Werder Bremen | 4 |
| 7 | (Germany) Jürgen Klinsmann | (France) Monaco | 4 |
| 7 | (Italy) Daniele Massaro | (Italy) Milan | 4 |
| 7 | (Russia) Viktor Onopko | (Russia) Spartak Moscow | 4 |
| 7 | (France) Jean-Pierre Papin | (Italy) Milan | 4 |
| 7 | (Russia) Nikolai Pisarev | (Russia) Spartak Moscow | 4 |
| 7 | (Russia) Sergey Rodionov | (Russia) Spartak Moscow | 4 |
| 7 | (Switzerland) Kubilay Türkyilmaz | (Turkey) Galatasaray | 4 |

== See also ==
- 1993–94 European Cup Winners' Cup
- 1993–94 UEFA Cup
