= Jérôme Gnako =

French footballer (born 1968)

Personal information
- Date of birth: 17 February 1968 (age 58)
- Place of birth: Bordeaux, Gironde, France
- Height: 1.82 m (6 ft 0 in)
- Positions: Attacking midfielder; striker

Senior career*
Years	Team	Apps	(Gls)
1986–1988	Bordeaux	6	(0)
1989	Olympique Alès	6	(2)
1989–1991	Angers	63	(8)
1991–1994	Monaco	87	(13)
1994–1995	Sochaux	14	(0)
1995–1996	→ Nice (loan)	27	(1)
Total		203	(24)

International career
1992–1994	France	2	(0)
- * Club domestic league appearances and goals

Jérôme Gnako (born 17 February 1968 in Bordeaux) is a French former footballer who played as an attacking midfielder or striker for several French clubs and twice for France national team.

== Honours ==
Bordeaux

- Division 1: 1987

Monaco

- European Cup Winners' Cup runner-up: 1991–92
