= Leif Sundell =

Swedish football referee

- Born: February 15, 1958 (age 68); Sweden Borlänge, Sweden

Domestic
| Years | League | Role |
| 1982–2004 | Allsvenskan | Referee |

International
| Years | League | Role |
| 1983-2003 | FIFA-listed | Referee |

Leif Sundell (born February 15, 1958, in Borlänge) is a retired Swedish association football referee. Sundell refereed a total of 262 Allsvenskan games, the Swedish top tier in football, in 22 years. He also refereed 100 international games during his career; two of those were matches played during UEFA Euro 1996 in England. In the quarter-final Germany versus Croatia (2:1) he gave a penalty kick and a red card against Croatia.
