= Kubilay Türkyilmaz =

Swiss footballer (born 1967)

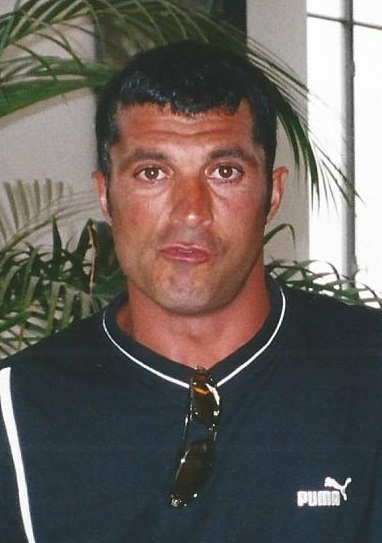

Personal information
- Date of birth: 4 March 1967 (age 59)
- Place of birth: Bellinzona, Switzerland
- Height: 1.82 m (6 ft 0 in)
- Position: Forward

Youth career
- 1985–1986: US Semine

Senior career*
Years	Team	Apps	(Gls)
1986–1989	Bellinzona	79	(46)
1989–1990	Servette	46	(25)
1990–1993	Bologna	83	(24)
1993–1995	Galatasaray	43	(16)
1995–1998	Grasshoppers	84	(51)
1998	Locarno	12	(6)
1999	Luzern	14	(6)
2000	Bellinzona	13	(15)
2000–2001	Brescia	9	(3)
2001	Lugano	6	(3)
Total		389	(195)

International career
1988–2001	Switzerland	64	(34)
- * Club domestic league appearances and goals

Kubilay Türkyilmaz (Turkish: Kubilay Türkyılmaz; born 4 March 1967) is a Swiss former professional footballer who played as a forward. He ended his international career as the all-time joint leading goal scorer for the Switzerland national team, with 34 goals in 64 appearances between 1988 and 2001, equalling the goals scored by Max Abegglen. Their record was bettered by Alexander Frei in 2008.

== Club career ==
Born in Bellinzona, Ticino, Türkyilmaz began his club career with the local club Bellinzona in 1986 and later joined Servette in 1989. He left the country in 1990 for the Italian club Bologna before joining Galatasaray of Turkey, where he won the Süper Lig in his first season, 1993–94, and scored twice against Manchester United in the next season's UEFA Champions League. In 1995, he returned to Switzerland with Grasshoppers, winning the league in 1995–96 and 1997–98.

== International career ==
Türkyilmaz made his international debut on 2 February 1988 against France in Toulouse as a 65th-minute substitute for Hans-Peter Zwicker. Switzerland lost the Tournoi de France match 2–1. His first goals were two against Luxembourg in qualification for the 1990 FIFA World Cup, on 21 September 1988, his seventh match.

He missed the 1994 FIFA World Cup with serious injury, but appeared at Euro 1996, scoring Switzerland's equaliser against England in the opening match of the tournament, a 1–1 draw at Wembley.

His last 8 international matches, from 1997 to 2001, saw him score 14 times, including his first international hat-trick, versus Azerbaijan in qualification for the 1998 FIFA World Cup. He added another hat trick, of three penalty kicks on 7 October 2000 in a 5–1 2002 FIFA World Cup qualifier in Zürich against the Faroe Islands. It was the first hat-trick of its kind in the competition's history. In his final match, on 5 September 2001, he scored twice against Luxembourg away in qualification for the 2002 FIFA World Cup.

== Personal life ==
Türkyilmaz was born in Switzerland to a family of Turkish descent that immigrated from the Yozgat Province; he has said that he would have played for Turkey had they inquired first. He once refused to play for Switzerland in a game against Turkey for fear of being branded a traitor. He now runs a café in his native Bellinzona.

== Career statistics ==
Scores and results list Switzerland's goal tally first, score column indicates score after each Türkyilmaz goal.

List of international goals scored by Kubilay Türkyilmaz
No.	Date	Venue	Opponent	Score	Result	Competition
1	21 September 1988	Stade Josy Barthel, Luxembourg, Luxembourg	Luxembourg	2–0	4–1	1990 FIFA World Cup qualification
2	21 September 1988	Stade Josy Barthel, Luxembourg, Luxembourg	Luxembourg	4–0	4–1	1990 FIFA World Cup qualification
3	21 June 1989	St. Jakob Stadion, Basel, Switzerland	Brazil	1–0	1–0	Friendly
4	20 September 1989	Stade de la Maladière, Neuchâtel, Switzerland	Portugal	1–0	1–2	1990 FIFA World Cup qualification
5	11 October 1989	St. Jakob Stadion, Basel, Switzerland	Belgium	2–1	2–2	1990 FIFA World Cup qualification
6	15 November 1989	Espenmoos, St. Gallen, Switzerland	Luxembourg	2–1	2–1	1990 FIFA World Cup qualification
7	8 May 1990	Wankdorfstadion, Bern, Switzerland	Argentina	1–1	1–1	Friendly
8	21 August 1990	Praterstadion, Vienna, Austria	Austria	1–1	3–1	Friendly
9	21 August 1990	Praterstadion, Vienna, Austria	Austria	2–1	3–1	Friendly
10	12 March 1991	Sportplatz Rheinau, Balzers, Liechtenstein	Liechtenstein	4–0	6–0	Friendly
11	1 May 1991	Vasil Levski National Stadium, Sofia, Bulgaria	Bulgaria	3–2	3–2	UEFA Euro 1992 qualifying
12	5 June 1991	Espenmoos, St. Gallen, Switzerland	San Marino	7–0	7–0	UEFA Euro 1992 qualifying
13	21 August 1991	Strahov Stadium, Prague, Czechoslovakia	Czechoslovakia	1–1	1–1	Friendly
14	9 October 1991	Stadion Allmend, Lucerne, Switzerland	Sweden	3–0	3–1	Friendly
15	17 April 1993	Ta' Qali National Stadium, Attard, Malta	Malta	2–0	2–0	1994 FIFA World Cup qualification
16	12 October 1994	Wankdorfstadion, Bern, Switzerland	Sweden	4–2	4–2	UEFA Euro 1996 qualifying
17	16 August 1995	Laugardalsvöllur, Reykjavík, Iceland	Iceland	2–0	2–0	UEFA Euro 1996 qualifying
18	11 October 1995	Hardturm, Zürich, Switzerland	Hungary	1–0	3–0	UEFA Euro 1996 qualifying
19	24 April 1996	Cornaredo Stadium, Lugano, Switzerland	Wales	2–0	2–0	Friendly
20	8 June 1996	Wembley Stadium, London, England	England	1–1	1–1	UEFA Euro 1996
21	30 April 1997	Hardturm, Zürich, Switzerland	Hungary	1–0	1–0	1998 FIFA World Cup qualification
22	11 October 1997	Hardturm, Zürich, Switzerland	Azerbaijan	1–0	5–0	1998 FIFA World Cup qualification
23	11 October 1997	Hardturm, Zürich, Switzerland	Azerbaijan	2–0	5–0	1998 FIFA World Cup qualification
24	11 October 1997	Hardturm, Zürich, Switzerland	Azerbaijan	5–0	5–0	1998 FIFA World Cup qualification
25	4 September 1990	Parken, Copenhagen, Denmark	Denmark	1–1	1–2	UEFA Euro 2000 qualifying
26	8 September 1999	Stade Olympique de la Pontaise, Lausanne, Switzerland	Belarus	1–0	2–0	UEFA Euro 2000 qualifying
27	8 September 1999	Stade Olympique de la Pontaise, Lausanne, Switzerland	Belarus	2–0	2–0	UEFA Euro 2000 qualifying
28	7 October 2000	Hardturm, Zürich, Switzerland	Faroe Islands	3–1	5–1	2002 FIFA World Cup qualification
29	7 October 2000	Hardturm, Zürich, Switzerland	Faroe Islands	4–1	5–1	2002 FIFA World Cup qualification
30	7 October 2000	Hardturm, Zürich, Switzerland	Faroe Islands	5–1	5–1	2002 FIFA World Cup qualification
31	11 October 2000	Bežigrad Stadium, Ljubljana, Slovenia	Slovenia	1–0	2–2	2002 FIFA World Cup qualification
32	11 October 2000	Bežigrad Stadium, Ljubljana, Slovenia	Slovenia	2–1	2–2	2002 FIFA World Cup qualification
33	5 September 2001	Stade Josy Barthel, Luxembourg, Luxembourg	Luxembourg	2–0	3–0	2002 FIFA World Cup qualification
34	5 September 2001	Stade Josy Barthel, Luxembourg, Luxembourg	Luxembourg	3–0	3–0	2002 FIFA World Cup qualification

== Honours ==
Galatasaray

- Süper Lig: 1993–94

Grasshoppers

- Nationalliga A: 1995–96, 1997–98

Individual

- Swiss Footballer of the Year: 1995–96, 1996–97, 1997–98
