= 1988–89 AC Milan season =

Milan
1988–89 season
- Owner: Silvio Berlusconi
- President: Silvio Berlusconi
- Manager: Arrigo Sacchi
- Stadium: San Siro
- Serie A: 3rd
- Coppa Italia: Group stage
- European Cup: Winners (in 1989–90 European Cup)
- Supercoppa Italiana: Winners
- Top goalscorer: League: Marco van Basten (19); All: Marco van Basten (33)
- Average home league attendance: 72,390
Home colours	Away colours	Third colours

AC Milan won the European Cup thanks to a 4–0 victory against Steaua București, with Dutch duo Ruud Gullit and Marco van Basten scoring twice each. It did not defend its Serie A title however, finishing 3rd in the standings. Milan also won the first Supercoppa Italiana, beating Sampdoria in the inaugural contest.

== Squad ==
Note: Flags indicate national team as defined under FIFA eligibility rules; some limited exceptions apply. Players may hold more than one non-FIFA nationality.

Pos.	Nation	Player
GK	ITA	Giovanni Galli
GK	ITA	Francesco Antonioli
GK	ITA	Davide Pinato
DF	ITA	Franco Baresi
DF	SUI	Walter Bianchi
DF	ITA	Alessandro Costacurta
DF	ITA	Filippo Galli
DF	ITA	Paolo Maldini
DF	ITA	Roberto Mussi
DF	ITA	Gianluca Pessotto
DF	ITA	Sergio Porrini
DF	ITA	Mauro Tassotti
DF	ITA	Matteo Villa
MF	ITA	Demetrio Albertini

Pos.	Nation	Player
MF	ITA	Carlo Ancelotti
MF	ITA	Angelo Colombo
MF	ITA	Roberto Donadoni
MF	ITA	Alberigo Evani
MF	ITA	Corrado Giannini
MF	NED	Ruud Gullit
MF	ITA	Fabio Lago
MF	ITA	Christian Lantignotti
MF	NED	Frank Rijkaard
MF	ITA	Fabio Viviani
FW	ITA	Massimiliano Cappellini
FW	ITA	Graziano Mannari
FW	ITA	Daniele Massaro
FW	NED	Marco van Basten
FW	ITA	Pietro Paolo Virdis

=== Transfers ===
In
Pos.	Name	from	Type
MF	Frank Rijkaard	Sporting Lisboa	-
FW	Giuseppe Galderisi	S.S. Lazio	loan ended
GK	Francesco Antonioli	AC Monza	
GK	Davide Pinato	AC Monza	
MF	Claudio Borghi	Como 1907	

Out
Pos.	Name	To	Type
GK	Daniele Limonta	Venezia	
GK	Giulio Nuciari	AC Monza	
DF	Rufo Emiliano Verga	Parma F.C.	loan
MF	Claudio Borghi	Neuchatel Xamax	-
MF	Mario Bortolazzi	Hellas Verona	-
FW	Stefano Borgonovo	Fiorentina	loan
FW	Giuseppe Galderisi	Hellas Verona	loan

==== Winter ====
In
Pos.	Name	from	Type
MF	Fabio Viviani	Como 1907	-

Out
Pos.	Name	To	Type
FW	Daniele Massaro	A.S. Roma	loan

== Competitions ==
=== Serie A ===
==== League table ====
Pos	Team	Pld	W	D	L	GF	GA	GD	Pts	Qualification or relegation
1	Internazionale (C)	34	26	6	2	67	19	+48	58	Qualification to European Cup
2	Napoli	34	18	11	5	57	28	+29	47	Qualification to UEFA Cup
3	Milan (Note: Milan qualified for the 1989–90 European Cup as the 1988–89 European Cup defending champions.)	34	16	14	4	61	25	+36	46	Qualification to European Cup
4	Juventus	34	15	13	6	51	36	+15	43	Qualification to UEFA Cup
5	Sampdoria	34	14	11	9	43	25	+18	39	Qualification to Cup Winners' Cup

Source: 1988–89 Serie A, RSSSF.com
Rules for classification: 1) Points; 2) Head-to-head points; 3) Head-to-head goal difference; 4) Goal difference; 5) Goals scored; 6) Draw.
(C) Champions

==== Results summary ====
Overall								Home						Away					
Pld	W	D	L	GF	GA	GD	Pts	W	D	L	GF	GA	GD	W	D	L	GF	GA	GD
34	16	14	4	61	25	+36	62	8	7	2	34	9	+25	8	7	2	27	16	+11

Source: Competitive matches

==== Results by round ====
Round	1	2	3	4	5	6	7	8	9	10	11	12	13	14	15	16	17	18	19	20	21	22	23	24	25	26	27	28	29	30	31	32	33	34
Ground	A	H	A	H	H	A	H	A	A	H	A	H	A	H	A	H	A	H	A	H	A	A	H	A	H	H	A	H	A	H	A	H	A	H
Result	W	W	D	D	W	L	L	W	L	D	D	L	W	W	D	W	D	W	W	D	W	D	W	D	D	D	W	D	D	D	W	W	W	W
Position	1	1	1	3	2	4	5	5	7	7	7	7	7	6	6	5	5	4	4	4	4	4	4	3	3	3	3	3	3	3	3	3	3	3

Source: Competitive matches
A = Away; H = Home; W = Win; D = Draw; L = Loss; = 1989–90 European Cup; = 1989–90 UEFA Cup

==== Matches ====
9 October 1988 1	Milan	4–0	Fiorentina	Milan
	Donadoni 14'; Virdis 78', 85', 89' (pen.)	Report		Stadium: San Siro; Attendance: 72,414; Referee: Arcangelo Pezzella

16 October 1988 2	Pescara	1–3	Milan	Pescara
	Edmar 82'	Report	Virdis 30' van Basten 63'; Ancelotti 70'	Stadium: Stadio Adriatico; Attendance: 27,039; Referee: Pierluigi Pairetto

23 October 1988 3	Milan	0–0	Lazio	Milan
		Report		Stadium: San Siro; Attendance: 72,507; Referee: Carlo Sguizzato

30 October 1988 4	Juventus	0–0	Milan	Turin
		Report		Stadium: Stadio Comunale di Torino; Attendance: 47,284; Referee: Luigi Agnolin

6 November 1988 5	Verona	1–2	Milan	Verona
	Caniggia 67'	Report	Gullit 23'; Soldà 80' (o.g.)	Stadium: Stadio Marc'Antonio Bentegodi; Attendance: 47,868; Referee: Tullio Lanese

20 November 1988 6	Milan	1–2	Atalanta	Milan
	Rijkaard 78'	Report	Baresi 75' (o.g.); Bonacina 90'	Stadium: San Siro; Attendance: 73,475; Referee: Pierluigi Pairetto

27 November 1988 7	Napoli	4–1	Milan	Naples
	Maradona 42'; Careca 45', 78'; Francini 48'	Report	Virdis 65' (pen.)	Stadium: Stadio San Paolo; Attendance: 82,760; Referee: Luigi Agnolin

4 December 1988 8	Milan	2–0	Lecce	Milan
	Righetti 11' (o.g.) van Basten 68' (pen.)	Report		Stadium: San Siro; Attendance: 71,234; Referee: Bruno Di Cola

11 December 1988 9	Milan	0–1	Inter Milan	Milan
		Report	Serena 26'	Stadium: San Siro; Attendance: 73,503; Referee: Pietro D'Elia

18 December 1988 10	Torino	2–2	Milan	Turin
	Müller 38', 83'	Report	van Basten 6', 89'	Stadium: Stadio Comunale di Torino; Attendance: 31,895; Referee: Carlo Longhi

31 December 1988 11	Milan	0–0	Sampdoria	Milan
		Report		Stadium: San Siro; Attendance: 72,371; Referee: Rosario Lo Bello

8 January 1989 12	Cesena	1–0	Milan	Cesena
	Holmqvist 69'	Report		Stadium: Stadio Dino Manuzzi; Attendance: 24,713; Referee: Arcangelo Pezzella

15 January 1989 13	Milan	4–0	Como	Milan
	van Basten 3'; Gullit 60'; Virdis 75' (pen.); Maccoppi 79' (o.g.)	Report		Stadium: San Siro; Attendance: 70,725; Referee: Bruno Di Cola

22 January 1989 14	Roma	1–3	Milan	Rome
	Völler 11'	Report	Tassotti 7' van Basten 30'; Virdis 79'	Stadium: Stadio Olimpico; Attendance: 41,191; Referee: Tullio Lanese

29 January 1989 15	Milan	0–0	Pisa	Milan
		Report		Stadium: San Siro; Attendance: 72,311; Referee: Gianluca Paparesta

5 February 1989 16	Ascoli	0–2	Milan	Ascoli Piceno
		Report	van Basten 37', 67' (pen.)	Stadium: Stadio Cino e Lillo Del Duca; Attendance: 19,984; Referee: Pierluigi Pairetto

12 February 1989 17	Milan	1–1	Bologna	Milan
	van Basten 72' (pen.)	Report	Baresi 90' (o.g.)	Stadium: San Siro; Attendance: 73,367; Referee: Angelo Amendolia

19 February 1989 18	Fiorentina	0–2	Milan	Florence
		Report	Colombo 45'; Ancelotti 78'	Stadium: Stadio Comunale (Florence); Attendance: 30,968; Referee: Arcangelo Pezzella

26 February 1989 19	Milan	6–1	Pescara	Milan
	Virdis 19', 82'; Rijkaard 50'; Gullit 65', 67'; Gasperini 85' (o.g.)	Report	Tita 49'	Stadium: San Siro; Attendance: 72 706; Referee: Virginio Quartuccio

5 March 1989 20	Lazio	1–1	Milan	Rome
	Sosa 35' (pen.)	Report	van Basten 24'	Stadium: Stadio Olimpico; Attendance: 41,927; Referee: Luigi Agnolin

12 March 1989 21	Milan	4–0	Juventus	Milan
	Tricella 12' (o.g.); Evani 14'; Mannari 69', 86'	Report		Stadium: San Siro; Attendance: 73,411; Referee: Pietro D'Elia

19 March 1989 22	Milan	1–1	Verona	Milan
	Gullit 17'	Report	Pacione 15'	Stadium: San Siro; Attendance: 72,810; Referee: Luciano Luci

1 April 1989 23	Atalanta	1–2	Milan	Bergamo
	E. Nicolini 4'	Report	Evani 14'; Rijkaard 60'	Stadium: Stadio Atleti Azzurri d'Italia; Attendance: 34,640; Referee: Bruno Di Cola

9 April 1989 24	Milan	0–0	Napoli	Milan
		Report		Stadium: San Siro; Attendance: 72,949; Referee: Pierluigi Pairetto

15 April 1989 25	Lecce	1–1	Milan	Lecce
	Benedetti 5'	Report	Virdis 26'	Stadium: Stadio Via del Mare; Attendance: 41,754; Referee: Arcangelo Pezzella

30 April 1989 26	Inter Milan	0–0	Milan	Milan
		Report		Stadium: San Siro; Attendance: 69,853; Referee: Pierluigi Magni

7 May 1989 27	Milan	2–1	Torino	Milan
	Colombo 47' van Basten 74'	Report	Bresciani 89'	Stadium: San Siro; Attendance: 72,167; Referee: Rosario Lo Bello

14 May 1989 28	Sampdoria	1–1	Milan	Genoa
	Pari 36'	Report	Rijkaard 45'	Stadium: Stadio Luigi Ferraris; Attendance: 18,520; Referee: Carlo Longhi

20 May 1989 29	Milan	0–0	Cesena	Milan
		Report		Stadium: San Siro; Attendance: 70,258; Referee: Angelo Amendolia

28 May 1989 30	Como	1–1	Milan	Como
	Annoni 6'	Report	Baresi 13'	Stadium: Stadio Giuseppe Sinigaglia; Attendance: 12,442; Referee: Arcangelo Pezzella

4 June 1989 31	Milan	4–1	Roma	Milan
	Tassotti 3'; Tempestilli 53' (o.g.) van Basten 56'; Baresi 83'	Report	Massaro 41'	Stadium: San Siro; Attendance: 72,176; Referee: Marcello Nicchi

11 June 1989 32	Pisa	0–2	Milan	Pisa
		Report	van Basten 33', 50'	Stadium: Arena Garibaldi; Attendance: 10,626; Referee: Gianni Beschin

18 June 1989 33	Milan	5–1	Ascoli	Milan
	Evani 11' van Basten 15', 23', 55'; Benetti 88' (o.g.)	Report	Casagrande 76'	Stadium: San Siro; Attendance: 69,147; Referee: Fabio Baldas

25 June 1989 34	Bologna	1–4	Milan	Bologna
	Marronaro 59'	Report	Mannari 3' van Basten 36', 86' (pen.); Colombo 76'	Stadium: Stadio Renato Dall'Ara; Attendance: 28,504; Referee: Piero Ceccarini

=== Coppa Italia ===
First round- Group 3

21 August 1988 1	Milan	2–0	Licata	Brescia
	Virdis 29'; Donadoni 57'			Stadium: Stadio Mario Rigamonti; Attendance: 10,000; Referee: Felicani

24 August 1988 2	Messina	1–1	Milan	Messina
	Pierleoni 48'		45' van Basten	Stadium: Giovanni Celeste; Attendance: 30,000; Referee: Paparesta

28 August 1988 3	Pescara	1–2	Milan	Pescara
	Zanone 1'		54', 64' van Basten	Stadium: Adriatico; Attendance: 23,615; Referee: Lo Bello

30 August 1988 4	Campobasso	1–3	Milan	Campobasso
	Moro 71'		26' Mannari; 48', 56' Gullit	Stadium: Stadio Nuovo Romagnoli; Attendance: 19,000; Referee: Baldas

3 September 1988 5	Milan	2–1	Lazio	Monza
	Mannari 11'; Cappellini 28'		42' Rizzolo	Stadium: Brianteo; Attendance: 15,000; Referee: D'Elia

Second round- Group 1

14 September 1988 1	Sambenedettese	0–3	Milan	San Benedetto del Tronto
			8', 75' Mannari; 25' Baresi	Stadium: Stadio Riviera delle Palme; Attendance: 5,408; Referee: Paparesta

21 September 1988 2	Milan	1–1	Hellas Verona	Bergamo
	Baresi 41' (pen.)		36' Caniggia	Stadium: Comunale; Attendance: 10,000; Referee: Longhi

28 September 1988 3	Torino	1–0	Milan	Turin
	Bresciani 28' (pen.)			Stadium: Comunale; Attendance: 14,759; Referee: Lo Bello

=== Supercoppa Italiana ===
14 June 1989	Milan	3–1	Sampdoria	San Siro, Milan
20:30 CEST (UTC+02:00)	Rijkaard 18'; Mannari 72'; Van Basten 90' (pen)	Report	Vialli 14'	Attendance: 19,412; Referee: Pietro D'Elia

=== European Cup ===
==== First round ====
7 September 1988 1	Vitosha (Bulgaria)	0–2	(Italy) Milan	Vasil Levski National Stadium, Sofia
19:30 CEST (UTC+02:00)		Report	Virdis 18'; Maldini (yellow card) 44'; Gullit 75'	Attendance: 32,500; Referee: Gerassimos Germanakos (Greece)

6 October 1988 2	Milan (Italy)	5–2	(Bulgaria) Vitosha	San Siro, Milan
19:30 CEST (UTC+01:00)	Van Basten 3', 13', 42', 83'; Virdis 63'	Report	Nachev 29'; Iliev (yellow card) 64', (goal) 73'	Attendance: 53,086; Referee: Joe Worrall (England)

==== Second round ====
26 October 1988 1	Milan (Italy)	1–1	(Socialist Federal Republic of Yugoslavia) Red Star Belgrade	San Siro, Milan
20:30 CEST (UTC+01:00)	Baresi (yellow card) 22'; Virdis 48'; Ancelotti (yellow card) 52'	Report	Najdoski (yellow card) 4'; Stojković 47'; Radovanovic (yellow card) 51'; Ivanovic (yellow card) 62'	Attendance: 71,316; Referee: Siegfried Kirschen (East Germany)

9 November 1988 2 (Note: The game was abandoned in the 65th minute because of dense fog and low visibility with the score at 1–0. The game was replayed from the beginning the next day at 3 p.m. with the same starting line-ups, with the exception of Milan players Pietro Paolo Virdis and Carlo Ancelotti; Virdis had been sent off in the abandoned match, while Ancelotti picked up his second yellow card of the competition, meaning that he had to sit out a match.)	Red Star Belgrade (Socialist Federal Republic of Yugoslavia)	1–0	(Italy) Milan	Red Star Stadium, Belgrade
17:00 CEST (UTC+01:00)	Sabanadzovic (yellow card) 29'; Stojković 50'	Report	Ancelotti (yellow card) 28'	Attendance: 97,400; Referee: Dieter Pauly (West Germany)

10 November 1988 Replay	Red Star Belgrade (Socialist Federal Republic of Yugoslavia)	1–1 (a.e.t.) (2–4 p)	(Italy) Milan	Red Star Stadium, Belgrade
15:00 CEST (UTC+01:00)	Najdoski (yellow card) 27'; Vasilijevic (yellow card) 36'; Stojković 39'	Report	Van Basten 35'; Maldini (yellow card) 107'	Attendance: 65,000; Referee: Dieter Pauly (West Germany)
	Penalties
	Stojković (penalty scored); Prosinečki (penalty scored); Savićević (penalty missed); Mrkela (penalty missed)		(penalty scored) Baresi; (penalty scored) Van Basten; (penalty scored) Evani; (penalty scored) Rijkaard

==== Quarter-finals ====
1 March 1989 1	Werder Bremen (West Germany)	0–0	(Italy) Milan	Weserstadion, Bremen
20:00 CEST (UTC+01:00)	Riedle (yellow card) 39'; Ordenewitz (yellow card) 56'	Report	Rijkaard (yellow card) 41'	Attendance: 39,500; Referee: José Rosa dos Santos (Portugal)

15 March 1989 2	Milan (Italy)	1–0	(West Germany) Werder Bremen	San Siro, Milan
20:30 CEST (UTC+01:00)	Van Basten 32' (pen.)	Report	Meier (yellow card) 32'; Sauer (yellow card) 35'; Votava (yellow card) 83'; Reck (yellow card) 90'	Attendance: 71,207; Referee: George Smith (Scotland)

==== Semi-finals ====
5 April 1989 1	Real Madrid (Spain)	1–1	(Italy) Milan	Santiago Bernabéu Stadium, Madrid
21:00 CEST (UTC+02:00)	Sánchez 41'	Report	Tassotti (yellow card) 53'; Van Basten 77'	Attendance: 100,000; Referee: Erik Fredriksson (Sweden)

19 April 1989 2	Milan (Italy)	5–0	(Spain) Real Madrid	San Siro, Milan
20:30 CEST (UTC+02:00)	Ancelotti 17'; Rijkaard 24'; Gullit 45'; Van Basten 49'; Donadoni 60'	Report	Sánchez (yellow card) 3'	Attendance: 73,112; Referee: Alexis Ponnet (Belgium)

==== Final ====
24 May 1989	Steaua București (Romania)	0–4	(Italy) Milan	Camp Nou, Barcelona
20:15 CEST (UTC+02:00)		Report	Gullit 18', 38'; Van Basten 28', 46'; Baresi (yellow card) 48'	Attendance: 97,000; Referee: Karl-Heinz Tritschler (West Germany)

== Statistics ==
=== Players statistics ===
No.	Pos	Nat	Player	Total		Serie A		European Cup		Coppa	
No.	Pos	Nat	Player	Apps	Goals	Apps	Goals	Apps	Goals	Apps	Goals
	GK	(Italy) ITA	G. Galli	47	-32	32	-23	9	-5	6	-4
	DF	(Italy) ITA	Tassotti	42	2	30	2	9	0	3	0
	DF	(Italy) ITA	Costacurta	40	0	20+6	0	5+2	0	7	0
	DF	(Italy) ITA	Baresi	49	4	33	2	8	0	8	2
	DF	(Italy) ITA	Maldini	40	0	26	0	7	0	7	0
	MF	(Italy) ITA	Colombo	44	3	28+2	3	9	0	5	0
	MF	(Italy) ITA	Ancelotti	37	3	27+1	2	7	1	2	0
	MF	(Netherlands) NED	Rijkaard	46	5	31	4	9	1	6	0
	MF	(Italy) ITA	Evani	38	3	29+1	3	5	0	3	0
	FW	(Netherlands) NED	Gullit	28	11	17+2	5	5+3	4	1	2
	FW	(Netherlands) NED	van Basten	46	32	33	19	9	10	4	3
	GK	(Italy) ITA	Pinato	4	-3	2	-2	0	0	2	-1
	MF	(Italy) ITA	Donadoni	37	3	20+1	1	9	1	7	1
	FW	(Italy) ITA	Virdis	35	14	17+9	10	3+3	3	3	1
	DF	(Italy) ITA	Mussi	28	0	10+9	0	2+1	0	6	0
	FW	(Italy) ITA	Mannari	22	7	8+9	3	1	0	4	4
	DF	(Italy) ITA	F. Galli	18	0	7+3	0	2+2	0	4	0
	MF	(Italy) ITA	Lantignotti	12	0	2+6	0	0+1	0	3	0
	MF	(Italy) ITA	Viviani	8	0	1+5	0	0	0	2	0
	FW	(Italy) ITA	Cappellini	10	1	1+2	0	0+2	0	5	1
	GK	(Italy) ITA	Antonioli	1	-1	0	0	0	0	1	-1
	DF	(Switzerland) SUI	Bianchi	9	0	0+2	0	0	0	7	0
	MF	(Italy) ITA	Albertini	1	0	0+1	0	0	0	0	0
	MF	(Italy) ITA	C. Giannini	1	0	0	0	0	0	1	0
	MF	(Italy) ITA	F. Lago	2	0	0	0	0	0	2	0
	FW	(Italy) ITA	Massaro	5	0	0	0	0	0	5	0
	DF	(Italy) ITA	M.Villa	1	0	0	0	0	0	1	0

- Source: http://calcio-seriea.net/presenze/1988/968/
