= 1992–93 AC Milan season =

Milan
1992–93 season
- President: Silvio Berlusconi
- Manager: Fabio Capello
- Stadium: San Siro
- Serie A: 1st (In 1993–94 European Cup)
- Supercoppa Italiana: Winners
- Coppa Italia: Semi-finals
- UEFA Champions League: Runners-up
- Top goalscorer: League: Marco van Basten; Jean-Pierre Papin (13 each); All: Marco van Basten; Jean-Pierre Papin (20 each)
- Average home league attendance: 75,830
Home colours	Away colours

Associazione Calcio Milan won two trophies in the 1992–93 season, which was crowned when it reached the European Cup final and won the domestic league for the second year running.

None of the other Serie A teams came close to challenging Milan in the league, with new signing Jean-Pierre Papin playing a vital role in the absence of lethal striker Marco van Basten, who albeit scored 13 goals in just 15 matches. Some defensive slips were redeemed by the 65 goals scored, which was the most of all teams in the league, and enough to clinch the title in front of city rivals Internazionale by four points. The season also saw memorable displays against Pescara, Fiorentina and Lazio in the beginning of the season. Against Pescara, Milan won 5–4 away from home, then beat Fiorentina 7–3 and Lazio at home by 5–3. In those three matches, van Basten totaled seven goals. Milan also crushed Napoli 5–1 at the Stadio San Paolo in Naples, with van Basten scoring four goals in Serie A for the first (and only) time.

The season also saw Milan set the world transfer record following an intensive bidding battle against Juventus to sign Gianluigi Lentini from 1992's surprise Torino team. Lentini did not perform to expectations, and was considered a disappointment, especially following a car accident in 1993, from which he recovered, but never rediscovered his form prior to the accident.

This season was also the last to feature every piece of the famous Dutch trio of Marco Van Basten, Ruud Gullit, and Frank Rijkaard; while the former would stay with Milan for another two years without playing due to a recurring ankle injury (and, eventually, retiring in August 1995), the latter two transferred out of Milan during post-season summer transfer window, with Gullit briefly returning for half the 1994–95 season.

== Squad ==
Note: Flags indicate national team as defined under FIFA eligibility rules; some limited exceptions apply. Players may hold more than one non-FIFA nationality.

Pos.	Nation	Player
GK	ITA	Sebastiano Rossi
GK	ITA	Francesco Antonioli
GK	ITA	Carlo Cudicini
DF	ITA	Mauro Tassotti
DF	ITA	Franco Baresi (Captain)
DF	ITA	Alessandro Costacurta
DF	ITA	Filippo Galli
DF	ITA	Stefano Nava
DF	ITA	Paolo Maldini
DF	ITA	Enzo Gambaro
MF	ITA	Roberto Donadoni
MF	ITA	Stefano Eranio
MF	ITA	Demetrio Albertini

Pos.	Nation	Player
MF	NED	Frank Rijkaard
MF	CRO	Zvonimir Boban
MF	ITA	Fernando De Napoli
MF	ITA	Gianluigi Lentini
MF	ITA	Alberigo Evani
FW	ITA	Daniele Massaro
FW	NED	Ruud Gullit
FW	YUG	Dejan Savićević
FW	NED	Marco van Basten
FW	FRA	Jean-Pierre Papin
FW	ITA	Marco Simone
FW	ITA	Aldo Serena

=== Transfers ===
In
Pos.	Name	from	Type
FW	Jean-Pierre Papin	Olympique de Marseille	
MF	Gianluigi Lentini	Torino	
MF	Dejan Savićević	Crvena Zvezda	
MF	Stefano Eranio	Genoa CFC	
DF	Stefano Nava	Parma Calcio 1913	-
MF	Fernando De Napoli	SSC Napoli	
FW	Massimiliano Cappellini	Piacenza Calcio 1919	loan ended
GK	Massimo Taibi	Como 1907	loan ended
MF	Zvonimir Boban	SSC Bari	loan ended
MF	Angelo Carbone	SSC Bari	loan ended

Out
Pos.	Name	To	Type
MF	Carlo Ancelotti		retired
MF	Diego Fuser	SS Lazio	
GK	Massimo Taibi	Piacenza Calcio	
FW	Giovanni Cornacchini	AC Perugia Calcio	
MF	Angelo Carbone	SSC Napoli	loan
FW	Massimiliano Cappellini	Atalanta BC	loan

==== Winter ====
In
Pos.	Name	from	Type
MF	Massimiliano Cappellini	Atalanta BC	loan ended
GK	Guido Bistazzoni		released

Out
Pos.	Name	To	Type
MF	Massimiliano Cappellini	Como 1907	loan

== Competitions ==
=== Supercoppa ===
30 August 1992	Milan	2–1	Parma	San Siro, Milan
20:30	Van Basten 14'; Massaro 70'	Report	Melli 45'	Referee: Pierluigi Pairetto

=== Serie A ===
==== League table ====
Pos	Team	Pld	W	D	L	GF	GA	GD	Pts	Qualification or relegation
1	Milan (C)	34	18	14	2	65	32	+33	50	Qualification to European Cup
2	Internazionale	34	17	12	5	59	36	+23	46	Qualification to UEFA Cup
3	Parma (Note: Parma qualified to 1993–94 UEFA Cup Winners' Cup as defending champions.)	34	16	9	9	47	34	+13	41	Qualification to Cup Winners' Cup
4	Juventus	34	15	9	10	59	47	+12	39	Qualification to UEFA Cup
5	Lazio	34	13	12	9	65	51	+14	38	Qualification to UEFA Cup

Source: 1992–93 Serie A, RSSSF.com
Rules for classification: 1) Points; 2) Head-to-head points; 3) Head-to-head goal difference; 4) Goal difference; 5) Goals scored; 6) Draw.(Note:
(C) Champions

==== Results summary ====
Overall								Home						Away					
Pld	W	D	L	GF	GA	GD	Pts	W	D	L	GF	GA	GD	W	D	L	GF	GA	GD
34	18	14	2	65	32	+33	68	9	6	2	28	12	+16	9	8	0	37	20	+17

Source: Competitive matches

==== Results by round ====
Round	1	2	3	4	5	6	7	8	9	10	11	12	13	14	15	16	17	18	19	20	21	22	23	24	25	26	27	28	29	30	31	32	33	34
Ground	H	A	H	A	A	H	A	H	A	H	A	H	H	A	A	H	A	H	A	H	A	H	A	H	A	H	A	H	A	A	H	A	H	A
Result	W	W	W	W	W	W	W	D	W	D	W	D	W	W	W	W	W	W	D	W	D	W	D	L	D	D	D	L	D	W	D	D	D	D
Position	4	1	1	2	1	1	1	1	1	1	1	1	1	1	1	1	1	1	1	1	1	1	1	1	1	1	1	1	1	1	1	1	1	1

Source: Competitive matches
A = Away; H = Home; W = Win; D = Draw; L = Loss; = 1992–93 European Cup; = 1992–93 UEFA Cup

==== Matches ====
6 September 1992 1	Milan	1–0	Foggia	Milan
	Grandini 59' (o.g.)	Report		Stadium: San Siro

13 September 1992 2	Pescara	4–5	Milan	Pescara
	Allegri 1'; Baresi 12' (o.g.), 14' (o.g.); Massara 23'	Report	Maldini 3'; Lentini 5'; Van Basten 37', 39', 72'	Stadium: Stadio Adriatico

20 September 1992 3	Milan	2–0	Atalanta	Milan
	Massaro 56'; Van Basten 68'	Report		Stadium: San Siro

4 October 1992 5	Fiorentina	3–7	Milan	Florence
	Baiano 13'; Effenberg 48'; Di Mauro 89'	Report	Massaro 25', 45'; Lentini 33'; Gullit 41', 86'; Van Basten 79', 90'	Stadium: Stadio Artemio Franchi

18 October 1992 6	Milan	5–3	Lazio	Milan
	Gullit 13'; Papin 14'; Van Basten 35' (pen.), 60' (pen.); Simone 80'	Report	Winter 21'; Fuser 52'; Signori 65'	Stadium: San Siro

25 October 1992 7	Parma	0–2	Milan	Parma
		Report	Papin 61'; Eranio 90'	Stadium: Stadio Ennio Tardini

1 November 1992 8	Milan	0–0	Torino	Milan
		Report		Stadium: San Siro

8 November 1992 9	Napoli	1–5	Milan	Naples
	Zola 83'	Report	Van Basten 6', 26', 68', 74'; Eranio 60'	Stadium: Stadio San Paolo

22 November 1992 10	Milan	1–1	Internazionale	Milan
	Lentini 40'	Report	De Agostini 74'	Stadium: San Siro

29 November 1992 11	Juventus	0–1	Milan	Turin
		Report	Simone 69'	Stadium: Stadio delle Alpi

6 December 1992 12	Milan	1–1	Udinese	Milan
	Albertini 33'	Report	Balbo 43'	Stadium: San Siro

13 December 1992 13	Milan	2–0	Ancona	Milan
	Papin 14', 51'	Report		Stadium: San Siro

23 December 1992 4	Sampdoria	1–2	Milan	Genoa
	Bonetti 45'	Report	Simone 28'; Gullit 58'	Stadium: Stadio Luigi Ferraris

3 January 1993 14	Roma	0–1	Milan	Rome
		Report	Gullit 30'	Stadium: Stadio Olimpico

10 January 1993 15	Milan	1–0	Cagliari	Milan
	Papin 54' (pen.)	Report		Stadium: San Siro

17 January 1993 16	Brescia	0–1	Milan	Brescia
		Report	Massaro 21'	Stadium: Stadio Mario Rigamonti

24 January 1993 17	Milan	1–0	Genoa	Milan
	Savićević 78' (pen.)	Report		Stadium: San Siro

31 January 1993 18	Foggia	2–2	Milan	Foggia
	Bresciani 36'; Seno 79'	Report	Papin 56'; Rijkaard 59'	Stadium: Stadio Pino Zaccheria

7 February 1993 19	Milan	4–0	Pescara	Milan
	Savićević 13'; Papin 17', 34'; Donadoni 90'	Report		Stadium: San Siro

14 February 1993 20	Atalanta	1–1	Milan	Bergamo
	Ganz 86'	Report	Papin 85'	Stadium: Stadio Atleti Azzurri d'Italia

28 February 1993 21	Milan	4–0	Sampdoria	Milan
	Lentini 7', 69'; Papin 21', 88'	Report		Stadium: San Siro

7 March 1993 22	Milan	2–0	Fiorentina	Milan
	Savićević 66', 88'	Report		Stadium: San Siro

14 March 1993 23	Lazio	2–2	Milan	Rome
	Gascoigne 38'; Bergodi 86'	Report	Papin 9'; Winter 37' (o.g.)	Stadium: Stadio Olimpico

21 March 1993 24	Milan	0–1	Parma	Milan
		Report	Asprilla 58'	Stadium: San Siro

28 March 1993 25	Torino	1–1	Milan	Turin
	Mussi 2'	Report	Gullit 57'	Stadium: Stadio delle Alpi

4 April 1993 26	Milan	2–2	Napoli	Milan
	Lentini 62', 66'	Report	Careca 15'; Policano 37'	Stadium: San Siro

10 April 1993 27	Internazionale	1–1	Milan	Milan
	Berti 44'	Report	Gullit 84'	Stadium: San Siro

18 April 1993 28	Milan	1–3	Juventus	Milan
	Simone 6'	Report	Möller 13', 20'; R. Baggio 65'	Stadium: San Siro

25 April 1993 29	Udinese	0–0	Milan	Udine
		Report		Stadium: Stadio Friuli

8 May 1993 30	Ancona	1–3	Milan	Ancona
	Vecchiola 59'	Report	Rijkaard 20'; Van Basten 37'; Albertini 46'	Stadium: Stadio del Conero

16 May 1993 31	Milan	0–0	Roma	Milan
		Report		Stadium: San Siro

23 May 1993 32	Cagliari	1–1	Milan	Cagliari
	Francescoli 5'	Report	Massaro 32'	Stadium: Stadio Sant'Elia

30 May 1993 33	Milan	1–1	Brescia	Milan
	Albertini 82'	Report	Brunetti 84'	Stadium: San Siro

6 June 1993 34	Genoa	2–2	Milan	Genoa
	Caricola 14'; Fortunato 90'	Report	Simone 59'; Papin 63'	Stadium: Stadio Luigi Ferraris

=== Coppa Italia ===
==== Second round ====
26 August 1992 1	Milan	4–0	Ternana	San Siro, Milan
20:30	Savićević 23' (pen.), 60'; Gullit 51'; Massaro 69'			Referee: Luciano Luci

2 September 1992 2	Ternana	2–6 (2–10 agg.)	Milan	Stadio Libero Liberati, Terni
20:30	Negri 45'; Ghezzi 85' (pen.)		Massaro 20'; Cavezzi 22' (o.g.); Savićević 25'; Gullit 59', 77'; Evani 66'	Referee: Pasquale Rodomonti

==== Third round ====
7 October 1992 1	Milan	3–0	Cagliari	San Siro, Milan
20:30	Papin 25', 26'; Lentini 63'			Referee: Roberto Bettin

28 October 1992 2	Cagliari	0–0 (0–3 agg.)	Milan	Stadio Sant'Elia, Cagliari
20:30				Referee: Pasquale Rodomonti

==== Quarter-finals ====
27 January 1993 1	Milan	0–0	Internazionale	San Siro, Milan
20:30				Referee: Gianni Beschin

10 February 1993 2	Internazionale	0–3 (0–3 agg.)	Milan	San Siro, Milan
20:30			Papin 5', 12'; Gullit 35'	Referee: Fabio Baldas

==== Semi-finals ====
10 March 1993 1	Roma	2–0	Milan	Stadio Olimpico, Rome
20:30	Muzzi 12'; Caniggia 89'			Referee: Pierluigi Pairetto

31 March 1993 2	Milan	1–0 (1–2 agg.)	Roma	San Siro, Milan
20:30	Eranio 37'			Referee: Arcangelo Pezzella

=== UEFA Champions League ===
==== First round ====
16 September 1992 1	Milan (Italy)	4–0	(Slovenia) Olimpija Ljubljana	San Siro, Milan
20:30	Van Basten 5', 50'; Albertini 7'; Papin 64'	Report		Attendance: 14,324; Referee: Roman Steindl (Austria)

30 September 1992 2	Olimpija Ljubljana (Slovenia)	0–3 (0–7 agg.)	(Italy) Milan	Bežigrad Stadium, Ljubljana
20:30		Report	Massaro 33'; Rijkaard 48'; Tassotti 85'	Attendance: 10,000; Referee: Jiří Ulrich (Czechoslovakia)

==== Second round ====
21 October 1992 1	Slovan Bratislava (Czechoslovakia)	0–1	(Italy) Milan	Tehelné pole, Bratislava
20:15		Report	Maldini 61'	Attendance: 33,467; Referee: Kim Milton Nielsen (Denmark)

4 November 1992 2	Milan (Italy)	4–0 (5–0 agg.)	(Czechoslovakia) Slovan Bratislava	San Siro, Milan
20:30	Boban 28'; Rijkaard 29'; Simone 49'; Papin 71'	Report		Attendance: 26,798; Referee: Antonio Martin Navarrete (Spain)

==== Group stage ====
Pos	Team	Pld	W	D	L	GF	GA	GD	Pts	Qualification
1	(Italy) Milan	6	6	0	0	11	1	+10	12	Advance to final
2	(Sweden) IFK Göteborg	6	3	0	3	7	8	−1	6	
3	(Portugal) Porto	6	2	1	3	5	5	0	5	
4	(Netherlands) PSV Eindhoven	6	0	1	5	4	13	−9	1	

Source: UEFA

25 November 1992 1	Milan (Italy)	4–0	(Sweden) IFK Göteborg	San Siro, Milan
20:30	Van Basten 33', 52' (pen.), 61', 62'	Report		Attendance: 55,697; Referee: Frans van den Wijngaert (Belgium)

9 December 1992 2	PSV Eindhoven (Netherlands)	1–2	(Italy) Milan	Philips Stadion, Eindhoven
20:30	Romário 66'	Report	Rijkaard 19'; Simone 62'	Attendance: 26,000; Referee: Alexey Spirin (Russia)

3 March 1993 3	Porto (Portugal)	0–1	(Italy) Milan	Estádio das Antas, Porto
19:30		Report	Papin 71'	Attendance: 35,000; Referee: Aron Schmidhuber (Germany)

17 March 1993 4	Milan (Italy)	1–0	(Portugal) Porto	San Siro, Milan
20:30	Eranio 31'	Report		Attendance: 67,389; Referee: Philip Don (England)

7 April 1993 5	IFK Göteborg (Sweden)	0–1	(Italy) Milan	Ullevi, Gothenburg
20:30		Report	Massaro 70'	Attendance: 40,323; Referee: Karl-Josef Assenmacher (Germany)

21 April 1993 6	Milan (Italy)	2–0	(Netherlands) PSV Eindhoven	San Siro, Milan
20:30	Simone 5', 18'	Report		Attendance: 56,862; Referee: Sándor Puhl (Hungary)

=== Final ===
26 May 1993	Marseille (France)	1–0	(Italy) Milan	Olympiastadion, Munich
20:15	Boli 43'	Report		Attendance: 64,400; Referee: Kurt Röthlisberger (Switzerland)

== Statistics ==
=== Players statistics ===
No.	Pos	Nat	Player	Total		Serie A		Coppa		European Cup	
No.	Pos	Nat	Player	Apps	Goals	Apps	Goals	Apps	Goals	Apps	Goals
	GK	(Italy) ITA	Rossi	39	-29	25+2	-25	6	-2	6	-2
	DF	(Italy) ITA	Tassotti	41	1	26+1	0	5	0	9	1
	DF	(Italy) ITA	Costacurta	47	0	31	0	6	0	10	0
	DF	(Italy) ITA	Baresi	44	0	29	0	7	0	8	0
	DF	(Italy) ITA	Maldini	49	3	31	2	8	0	10	1
	MF	(Italy) ITA	Donadoni	26	1	15+5	1	0	0	5+1	0
	MF	(Italy) ITA	Albertini	42	3	23+6	2	6	0	7	1
	MF	(Netherlands) NED	Rijkaard	33	5	22	2	5	0	6	3
	MF	(Italy) ITA	Lentini	45	8	28+2	7	6	1	9	0
	FW	(Italy) ITA	Massaro	45	9	14+15	5	7	2	5+4	2
	FW	(France) FRA	Papin	33	20	22	13	4	4	6+1	3
	GK	(Italy) ITA	Antonioli	14	-7	9	-7	1	0	4	0
	FW	(Netherlands) NED	Van Basten	21	19	14+1	13	1	0	5	6
	MF	(Italy) ITA	Eranio	33	4	13+8	2	7	1	2+3	1
	FW	(Netherlands) NED	Gullit	25	11	13+2	7	6	4	4	0
	DF	(Italy) ITA	Nava	24	0	12+2	0	5	0	4+1	0
	MF	(Croatia) CRO	Boban	22	1	12+1	0	3	0	6	1
	FW	(Federal Republic of Yugoslavia) YUG	Savicevic	17	7	10	4	4	3	2+1	0
	MF	(Italy) ITA	Evani	28	1	8+10	0	4	1	5+1	0
	FW	(Italy) ITA	Simone	25	9	8+5	5	4	0	4+4	4
	DF	(Italy) ITA	Gambaro	20	0	6+5	0	4	0	2+3	0
	MF	(Italy) ITA	De Napoli	7	0	1+3	0	2	0	1	0
	DF	(Italy) ITA	Galli	1	0	0+1	0	0	0	0	0
	FW	(Italy) ITA	Serena	2	0	0+1	0	1	0	0	0
	GK	(Italy) ITA	Cudicini	3	-2	0	0	1	-2	1+1	0

- Source: https://www.bdfutbol.com/en/t/t1992-933015.html
