= Mannari =

Mannari is an Italian surname. Notable people with the surname include:

- Graziano Mannari (born 1969), Italian footballer
- Guido Mannari (1944–1988), Italian actor
