= Franco Baresi =

Italian footballer (1960–2026)

Franco Baresi OMRI
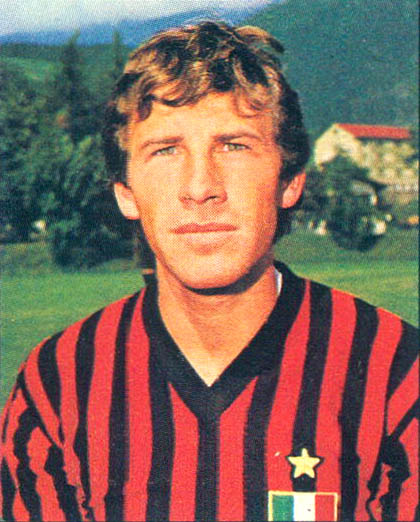
- Baresi with Milan in 1979

Personal information
- Full name: Franco Baresi
- Birth name: Franchino Baresi
- Date of birth: 8 May 1960
- Place of birth: Travagliato, Brescia, Italy
- Date of death: 31 July 2026 (aged 66)
- Place of death: Rozzano, Milan, Italy
- Height: 1.76 m (5 ft 9 in)
- Position: Centre-back

Youth career
- 1974–1978: AC Milan

Senior career*
Years	Team	Apps	(Gls)
1977–1997	AC Milan	532	(16)

International career
1979–1982	Italy U21	18	(2)
1983–1984	Italy Olympic	10	(0)
1982–1994	Italy	81	(1)

Managerial career
- 2002–2006: AC Milan Primavera
- 2006–2008: Milan Primavera (Berretti)
Medal record
Men's football
Representing Italy
FIFA World Cup
Winner	1982 Spain
Runner-up	1994 United States
Third place	1990 Italy
- * Club domestic league appearances and goals

Franco Baresi (Italian pronunciation: [ˈfraŋko baˈreːzi, -eːsi]; born Franchino Baresi; 8 May 1960 – 31 July 2026) was an Italian football player and manager. He mainly played as a central defender, and spent his entire 20-year career with Serie A club AC Milan, captaining the club for 15 seasons. Widely regarded as one of the greatest defenders of all time, he was ranked 19th in World Soccer magazine's list of the 100 greatest players of the 20th century. With Milan, he won three European Cup/UEFA Champions League titles, six Serie A trophies, four Supercoppa Italiana titles, two European Super Cups, and two Intercontinental Cups.

With the Italy national team, he was a member of the squad that won the 1982 FIFA World Cup, the first in 44 years. He also played in the 1990 World Cup held on home soil, where he was named in the FIFA World Cup All-Star Team, while leading them to a third place in the tournament. At the 1994 World Cup, he was named Italy's captain and was part of the squad that reached the final, although he would miss a penalty in the resulting shoot-out as Brazil lifted the trophy. Baresi also represented Italy at two UEFA European Championships, in 1980 and 1988, and at the 1984 Olympics, reaching the semi-finals on each occasion.

The younger brother of former footballer Giuseppe Baresi, after joining the Milan senior team as a youngster, Franco was initially nicknamed "Piscinin", Milanese for "little one". Due to his skill and success, he was later known as "Kaiser Franz", a reference to fellow sweeper Franz Beckenbauer. In 1999, he was voted Milan's Player of the Century. After his final season at Milan in 1997, the club retired Baresi's shirt number 6. He was named by Pelé one of the 125 Greatest Living Footballers at the FIFA centenary awards ceremony in 2004. Baresi was inducted into the Italian Football Hall of Fame in 2013.

== Early life ==
Franco Baresi was born Franchino Baresi on 8 May 1960 on a farm in the small north Italian town of Travagliato, near Brescia. He did not watch football on television until he was 10. In 1999, Baresi legally changed his name to Franco.

== Club career ==
Originally an AC Milan youth product, Baresi went on to spend his entire 20-year professional career with AC Milan, making his Serie A debut at age 17 during the 1977–78 season on 23 April 1978. He had initially been rejected by the Inter Milan youth team, who chose his brother Giuseppe instead, hence the Milan youth team signed Franco Baresi. The two brothers ended up captaining their respective teams shortly after, with their image while exchanging pennants became the trademark of Milan's derby della Madonnina throughout the 80s.

The following season, he was made a member of the starting 11, playing as a sweeper or as a centreback, winning the 1978–79 Serie A title, Milan's tenth overall, playing alongside Fabio Capello and Gianni Rivera.

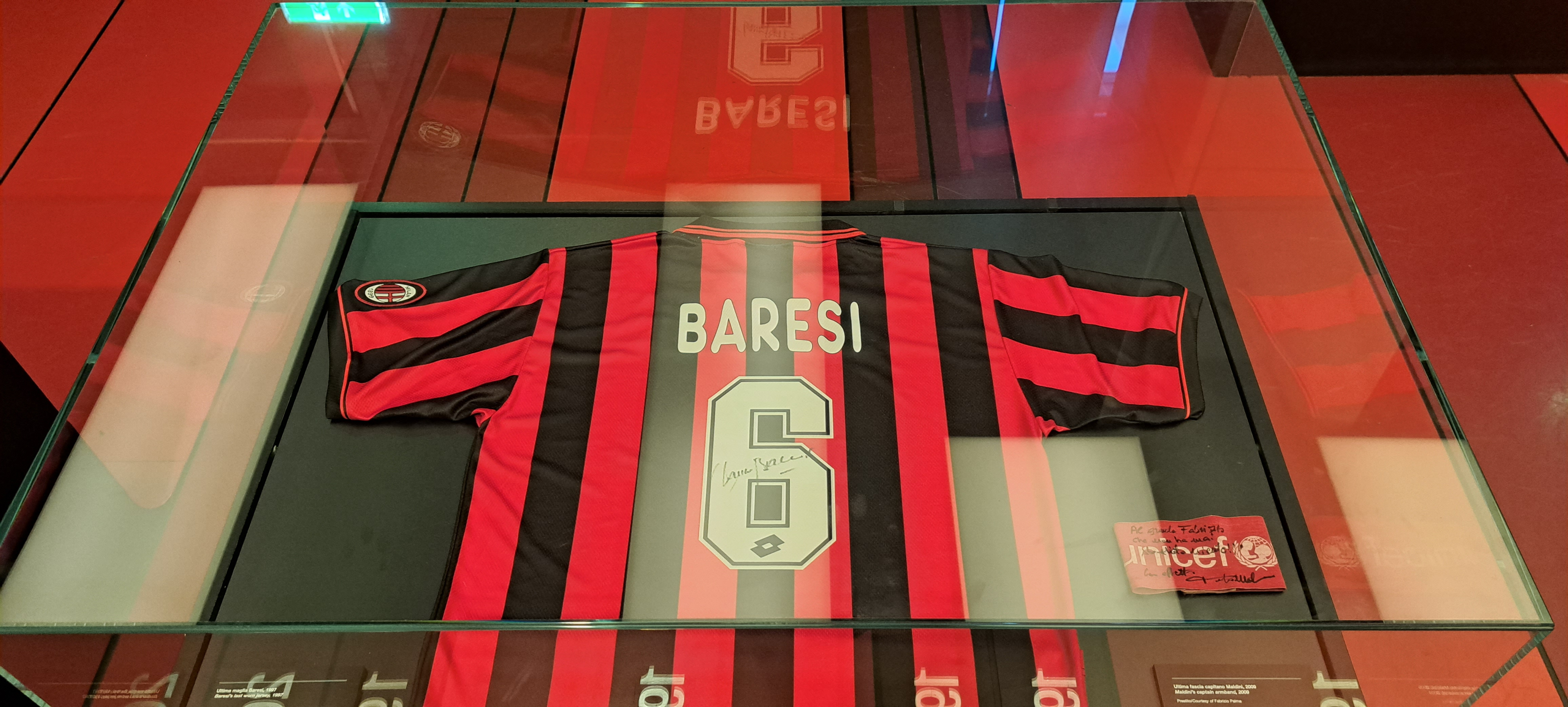
AC Milan jersey of Baresi

This success was soon followed by a dark period in the club's history, when Milan was relegated to Serie B twice during the early 1980s. Milan were relegated in 1980 for being involved in the match fixing scandal of 1980, and once again after finishing third-last in the 1981–82 season, after having just returned to Serie A the previous season, after winning the 1980–81 Serie B title.

Despite being a member of the Euro 1980 Italy squad that had finished fourth, and the 1982 World Cup-winning team, Baresi elected to stay with Milan, winning the Serie B title for the second time during the 1982–83 season and bringing Milan back to Serie A. After Aldo Maldera and Fulvio Collovati left the club in 1982, Baresi was appointed Milan's captain, at age 22; he held this position for much of his time at the club, a record 15 seasons, also becoming a symbol and a leader for the team. During this bleak period for Milan, Baresi did manage to win a Mitropa Cup in 1982 and reached the Coppa Italia final during 1984–85 season, although the team failed to dominate in Serie A.

During the end of the 1980s and the first half of the 1990s, Baresi was at the heart of a notable all-Italian defence alongside Paolo Maldini, Alessandro Costacurta, Mauro Tassotti and later Christian Panucci, under managers Arrigo Sacchi and Fabio Capello, a defence which is regarded by many as one of the greatest of all time. (Note: See)

When the attacking Dutch trio of Marco van Basten, Ruud Gullit and Frank Rijkaard arrived at the club in the late 1980s, Milan began a period of domestic and international triumphs, and between 1987 and 1996, at the height of the club's success, the Milan squad contained many Italian and international stars, such as Roberto Donadoni, Carlo Ancelotti, Marco van Basten, Ruud Gullit, Frank Rijkaard and later Demetrio Albertini, Dejan Savićević, Zvonimir Boban, Marcel Desailly, George Weah, Jean-Pierre Papin, Brian Laudrup and Roberto Baggio. Under Sacchi, Milan won the Serie A title in 1987–88, with Baresi helping Milan to concede only 14 goals in 30 games. This title was immediately followed by a Supercoppa Italiana in 1988 the next season, and back-to-back European Cups in 1988–89 and 1989–90; In the 1990 European Cup Final, Baresi turned in a dominant performance as the team's captain, helping Milan to defend the European Cup title and keep a clean sheet in a 1–0 victory over Benfica. Baresi was also runner-up to teammate Van Basten for the Ballon d'Or in 1989, finishing ahead of his other teammate Frank Rijkaard, and was named Serie A Footballer of the Year in 1989–90. Milan also reached the Coppa Italia final during the 1989–90 season, with Baresi finishing as tournament top scorer, including a hat trick of penalties against Messina.

Baresi went on to win four more Serie A titles with Milan under Fabio Capello, including three consecutive titles in 1991–92, 1992–93 and the 1993–94 seasons. Baresi helped Milan win the 1991–92 title undefeated, helping Milan to go unbeaten for an Italian record of 58 matches. Milan also scored a record 74 goals that season. During the 1993–94 season, Baresi helped Milan concede a mere 15 goals in Serie A in 34 games, a Serie A record, helping the club to finish the season with the best defence, and also helping the team achieve a 929-minute unbeaten streak, a Serie A record at the time. Baresi also won three consecutive Supercoppa Italiana under Capello, in 1992, 1993 and 1994. Milan also reached three consecutive UEFA Champions League finals during the 1992–93, 1993–94 and 1994–95 seasons, losing to Marseille in 1992–93 and Ajax in 1994–95. Baresi won the third European Cup/UEFA Champions League of his career in 1993–94 when Milan defeated Johan Cruyff's Barcelona "Dream Team" 4–0 in the final, although Baresi was suspended for the match. Baresi also managed to win the 1994 European Super Cup, although Milan were defeated in the 1994 Intercontinental Cup, the 1993 European Super Cup and the 1993 Intercontinental Cup. Under Capello, Milan and Baresi were able to capture another Serie A title during 1995–96 season, Baresi's sixth.

Baresi retired at the end of the 1996–97 Serie A season, at age 37. In his 20 seasons with Milan, he won six Serie A titles, three European Cup/UEFA Champions League titles (reaching five finals in total), two Intercontinental Cups (four finals in total), three European Supercups (four finals in total), four Supercoppa Italiana (five finals in total), two Serie B titles and a Mitropa Cup. He scored 31 goals for Milan, 21 of which were on penalties, and, despite being a defender, he was the top scorer of the Coppa Italia during the 1989–90 season, the only trophy which he failed to win with Milan, reaching the final twice during his career. His final goal for Milan was scored in a 2–1 win against Padova on 27 August 1995. In his honour, Milan retired his number 6 shirt, which he had worn throughout his career. The captain's armband, which he had worn for 15 seasons, was handed over to Paolo Maldini. Milan organised a celebration match in his honour, which was played on 28 October 1997 at the San Siro, featuring many footballing stars.

== International career ==
At age 20, while still playing in the Italy under-21 side, Baresi was named in Italy's 22-man squad for the 1980 European Championship (along with his older brother Giuseppe) by manager Enzo Bearzot. The tournament was held on home soil and Italy finished fourth. However, unlike his brother, Franco Baresi did not play a single match in the tournament. Euro 1980 would be the only time the two brothers were on the Italy squad together at a major tournament. At age 22, Baresi was named in Italy's squad for the 1982 FIFA World Cup. The Azzurri won their third World Cup, defeating West Germany 3–1 in the final, but Baresi, once again, was not selected to play a match throughout the tournament. Baresi was also a member of the Italy squad that took part in the 1984 Olympics. Italy finished in fourth place after a 2–1 semi-final defeat to Brazil, and after losing the bronze medal match 2–1 to Yugoslavia.

Baresi won his first senior international cap in a 1984 UEFA Championship qualifying match against Romania in Florence, on 14 December 1982, a 0–0 draw. Italy, however, ultimately failed to qualify for the final tournament.

Baresi was not included in Italy's squad for the 1986 World Cup by coach Enzo Bearzot, who saw him as being more of a midfielder than a defender (although his brother Giuseppe was selected as a defender for the World Cup, as well as Roberto Tricella). He returned to the team for the 1988 European Championship, playing as a sweeper and becoming an undisputed first team member and playing in every match under Azeglio Vicini; Italy reached the semi-finals, losing 2–0 to the Soviet Union. Prior to the tournament, he scored his only international goal from a penalty in a 4–1 friendly home win against the same opponent on 20 February 1988. He made his first appearance in a World Cup finals match in the 1990 tournament, which was held on home soil, and he played in every match as one of the starting centre-backs, as Italy finished in third-place, defeating England 2–1 in the third-place play-off, after being eliminated by defending champions Argentina in a penalty shootout following a 1–1 draw in the semi-finals. Baresi helped the Italian defence to keep five consecutive clean sheets, only conceding two goals, and going unbeaten for a World Cup record of 518 minutes, until they were beaten by an Claudio Caniggia's equaliser in the semi-final against Argentina. His performances earned him a spot on the 1990 World Cup Team of the tournament.

After replacing Giuseppe Bergomi as captain for the 1994 World Cup under his former manager at Milan, Arrigo Sacchi, Baresi sustained an injury to his meniscus in Italy's second group match, a 1–0 win against Norway, and missed most of the tournament. He returned to the squad 25 days later, in time for the final, with a dominant defensive performance, helping Italy to keep a clean sheet against Brazil, despite the key defensive absences of his Milan teammates Alessandro Costacurta and Mauro Tassotti. After a 0–0 deadlock following extra time, the match went to a penalty shootout, and Baresi subsequently missed his penalty, suffering from severe cramps and fatigue. Following misses by Daniele Massaro and Roberto Baggio, Italy were defeated by Brazil in the penalty shootout.

Following the World Cup defeat, Baresi made one more appearance for Italy, in an away UEFA Euro 1996 qualifying match against Slovenia on 7 September 1994, which ended in a 1–1 draw. Baresi subsequently retired from the national side at age 34, passing the captain's armband to his Milan teammate Paolo Maldini. Baresi amassed 81 caps for Italy, and he is one of seven players to have achieved the rare feat of winning Gold, Silver, and Bronze FIFA World Cup medals during his international career.

== Player profile ==
=== Style of play ===
Baresi was known for his consistency and all-around defensive ability, combining physical strength with technical composure. He possessed notable attributes including pace, strength, concentration, and stamina, which contributed to his effectiveness in aerial situations despite not having the typical height for a centre-back.

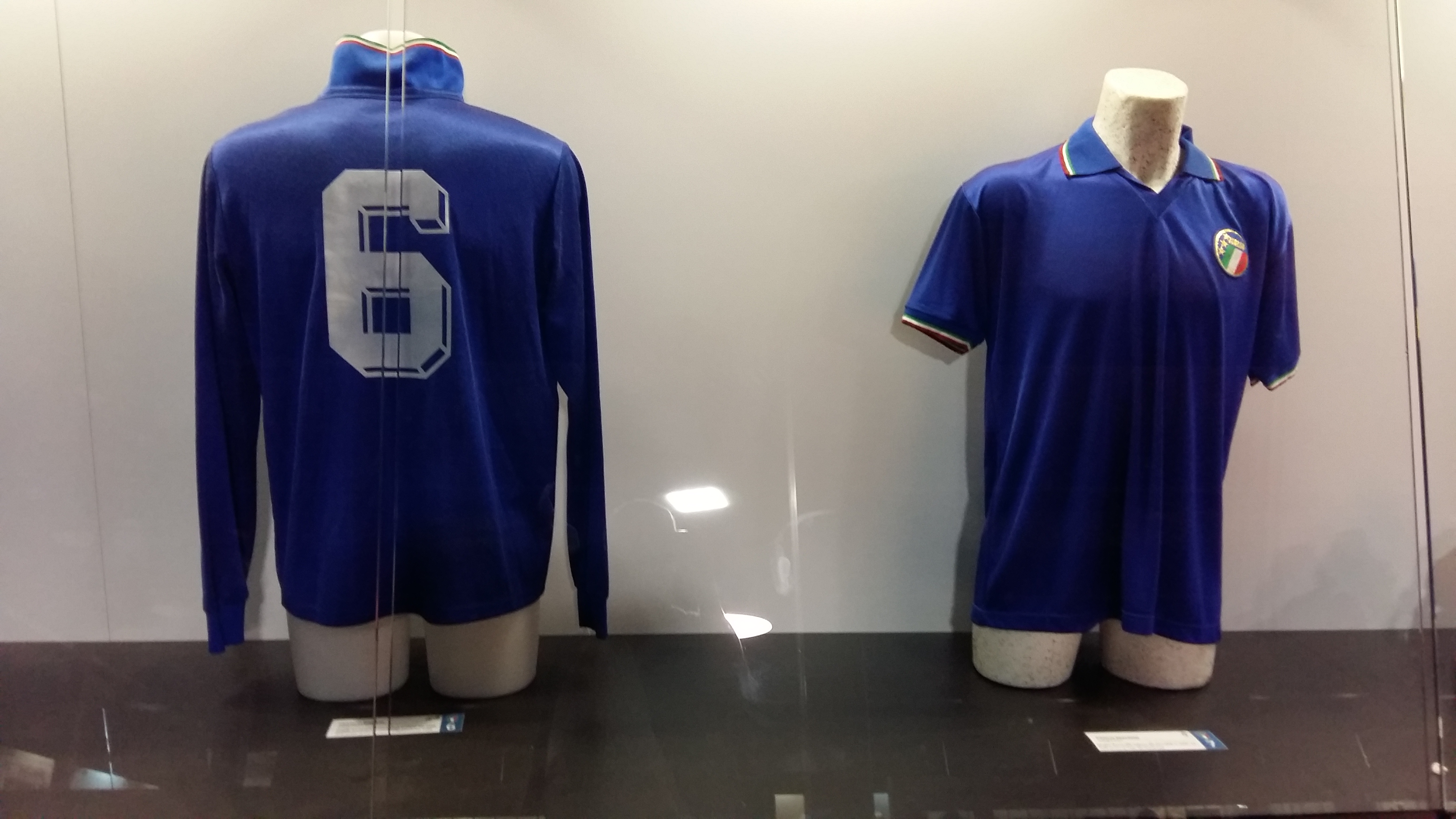
Baresi's Italy jersey (6) next to Paolo Maldini's jersey at the San Siro museum, September 2018

Although Baresi was capable of playing anywhere along the backline, he mostly played in the four-man defense, usually positioned as a left centre back (although his stronger foot was right, he was good on the ball with both of his feet), and was often assigned the role of libero, where he combined his defensive attributes and his ability to read the game with his excellent vision, technique, distribution and ball skills. These qualities also enabled him to excel in a zonal marking system, maintain a high defensive line, and play the offside trap, in particular during his time at Milan under Sacchi; indeed, Baresi came to be known for often raising his arm towards the linesman whenever his team attempted to play the offside trap. Baresi's passing range, technical ability and ball control allowed him to advance forward into the midfield to start attacking plays from the back, enabling him to function as a secondary playmaker for his team, and also play as a defensive or central midfielder when necessary. Despite being a defender, he was also an accurate penalty kick taker. Baresi was known for being a strong and accurate tackler, who was very good at winning back possession, and at anticipating and intercepting plays, due to his acute tactical intelligence, speed of thought, marking ability and positional sense. A precocious talent in his youth, throughout the course of his career, he also stood out for his professionalism, athleticism, longevity, and discipline in training, as well as his outstanding leadership, commanding presence on the pitch and his organisational skills; indeed, he captained both Milan and the Italy national team.

=== Legacy and records ===
Baresi played his entire 20-year career with Milan, becoming a central figure and a legend in the club's history. He captained the team for a record 15 seasons. During his time at Milan, he formed one of the most formidable defensive units of all time, alongside Paolo Maldini, Alessandro Costacurta, Mauro Tassotti, Filippo Galli, and later Christian Panucci. The defensive unit achieved a 929-minute unbeaten streak during the 1993–94 Serie A season, an Italian league record at the time, and also only conceded a Serie A record 15 goals in 34 league matches. Baresi also shares the record of most own goals scored in Serie A history (eight, along with Riccardo Ferri). At the 1990 World Cup, Baresi helped the Italy national team defence keep five consecutive clean sheets, only conceding two goals in seven games, and going unbeaten for a World Cup record of 518 minutes; the record stood until 2026.

Baresi is widely regarded by many pundits, players, and managers as one of the greatest defenders and sweepers of all time; he was ranked 19th in World Soccer magazine's list of the 100 greatest players of the 20th century. He was nicknamed "Kaiser Franz" throughout his career, a reference to fellow sweeper Franz Beckenbauer. In 1999, he was voted Milan's Player of the Century. After his final season at Milan in 1997, the club retired Baresi's shirt number 6. He was named by Pelé one of the 125 Greatest Living Footballers at the FIFA centenary awards ceremony in 2004. Baresi was inducted into the Italian Football Hall of Fame in 2013.

== After retirement ==
On 1 June 2002, Baresi was officially appointed director of football at Fulham, but tensions between Baresi and then Fulham manager Jean Tigana led to his resignation from the club in August. He was then appointed head coach of Milan's Primavera Under-20 squad until 2004. In 2006, he was moved by the club to coach the Berretti Under-19 squad, with his former teammate Filippo Galli replacing him at the helm of the Primavera squad.

On 4 August 2008, Baresi joined Milan's marketing team as one of the directors. Following the conclusion of Silvio Berlusconi's presidency with the club, he became a brand ambassador for the club on 18 May 2017. On 28 October 2020, Baresi was named an honorary vice-president of the club.

== Personal life ==
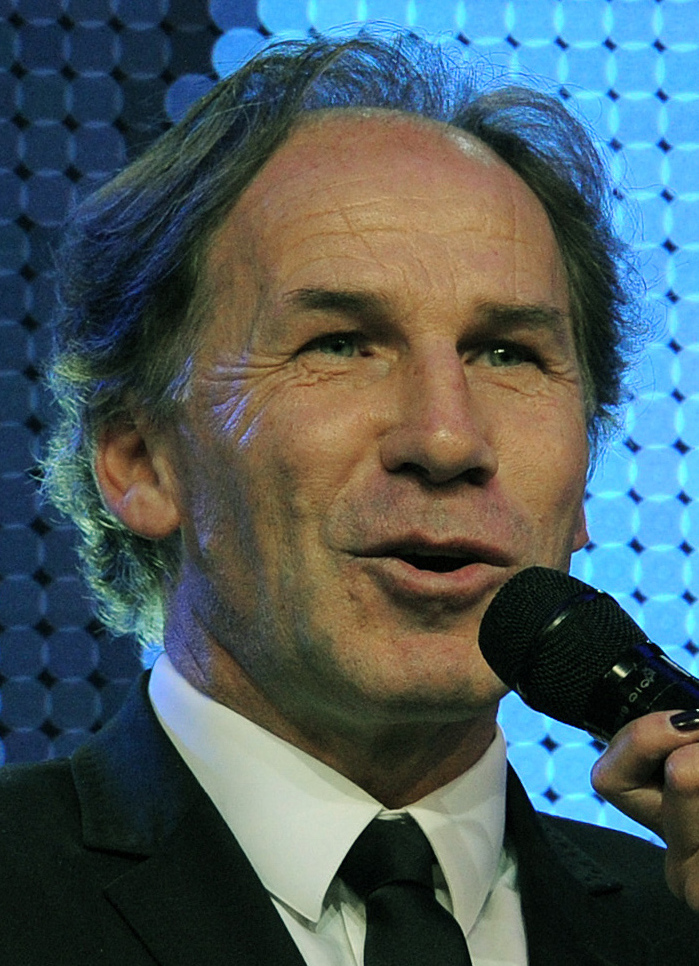
Baresi in 2012

Franco Baresi was the younger brother of Inter Milan defender Giuseppe Baresi. As youngsters, both players had trials for Inter, but Franco was rejected and signed by local rivals Milan. As he was the younger player, Franco was initially known as "Baresi 2". However, due to Franco's eventual great success and popularity throughout his career, which surpassed even that of his older brother's, Giuseppe later became known as "the other Baresi", despite also achieving notable success.

In 2004, Baresi was investigated for usury and money laundering related to fraud involving the sale of paintings. In October 2005, he accepted a plea bargain in which he received a five-month sentence reduced to a €5,900 fine.

In February 2026, Baresi and Giuseppe Bergomi were the two surprise torchbearers for the 2026 Winter Olympics opening ceremony in Milan; the two carried the Olympic torch through the San Siro stadium. It was his last public appearance.

=== Health and death ===
In 1981, Baresi suffered from a blood infection that forced him out of play for nearly four months and worsened his health to the point of him needing a wheelchair. While in treatment, he participated in medical research for the disease.

In August 2025, Baresi had lung surgery to remove a pulmonary nodule. He then began a course of immunotherapy as a means of cancer prevention.

On 29 July 2026, Baresi was prematurely reported to have died by Tuttosport, with the unconfirmed information quickly spreading through Italian media and prompting tributes from fans and celebrities, including the country's deputy prime minister Matteo Salvini, a well-known Milan fan. In response, AC Milan urgently issued the official statement refuting the false claim that Baresi had died, yet hinting at him experiencing a major setback with his health. Baresi died two days later in hospital in Rozzano, Milan, at the age of 66. A day of city-wide mourning was declared on 4 August in Milan, and his funeral was held at the Basilica di Sant'Ambrogio with huge crowd of fans, former teammates, and opponents gathered to pay their respects.

== Media ==
Baresi is featured in the EA Sports football video game series FIFA 14's Classic XI – a multi-national all-star team, along with compatriots Bruno Conti, Gianni Rivera and Giacinto Facchetti. He was also named in the Ultimate Team Legends in FIFA 15.

== Career statistics ==
=== Club ===
Appearances and goals by club, season and competition
Club	Season	League			Coppa Italia		Europe (Note: Appearances in UEFA Champions League, UEFA Cup, and European Super Cup)		Other		Total	
Club	Season	Division	Apps	Goals	Apps	Goals	Apps	Goals	Apps	Goals	Apps	Goals
AC Milan	1977–78	Serie A	1	0	2	0	–		–		3	0
AC Milan	1978–79	Serie A	30	0	4	0	6	0	–		40	0
AC Milan	1979–80	Serie A	28	0	6	0	1	0	–		35	0
AC Milan	1980–81	Serie B	31	0	4	1	0	0	–		35	1
AC Milan	1981–82	Serie A	18	2	4	0	–		3	2	25	4
AC Milan	1982–83	Serie B	30	4	9	2	–		–		39	6
AC Milan	1983–84	Serie A	21	3	9	2	–		–		30	5
AC Milan	1984–85	Serie A	26	0	10	0	–		–		36	0
AC Milan	1985–86	Serie A	20	0	4	0	3	0	3	0	30	0
AC Milan	1986–87	Serie A	29	2	6	3	–		–		35	5
AC Milan	1987–88	Serie A	27	1	6	0	3	0	–		36	1
AC Milan	1988–89	Serie A	33	2	8	2	8	0	1	0	50	4
AC Milan	1989–90	Serie A	30	1	7	4	8	0	1	0	46	5
AC Milan	1990–91	Serie A	31	0	1	0	5	0	1	0	38	0
AC Milan	1991–92	Serie A	33	0	6	1	–		–		39	1
AC Milan	1992–93	Serie A	29	0	7	0	8	0	1	0	45	0
AC Milan	1993–94	Serie A	31	0	0	0	11	0	2	0	44	0
AC Milan	1994–95	Serie A	28	0	0	0	13	0	2	0	43	0
AC Milan	1995–96	Serie A	30	1	3	0	7	0	–		40	1
AC Milan	1996–97	Serie A	26	0	1	0	2	0	1	0	30	0
Career total			532	16	97	15	75	0	15	2	719	33

=== International ===
Appearances and goals by national team and year
National team	Year	Apps	Goals
Italy	1982	1	0
Italy	1983	3	0
Italy	1984	5	0
Italy	1985	0	0
Italy	1986	3	0
Italy	1987	5	0
Italy	1988	11	1
Italy	1989	10	0
Italy	1990	11	0
Italy	1991	9	0
Italy	1992	7	0
Italy	1993	7	0
Italy	1994	9	0
Total		81	1

Scores and results list Italy's goal tally first, score column indicates score after each Baresi goal.

List of international goals scored by Franco Baresi
No.	Date	Venue	Opponent	Score	Result	Competition
1	20 February 1988	Stadio della Vittoria, Bari, Italy	Soviet Union	1–0	4–1	Friendly

== Honours ==
AC Milan

- Serie A: 1978–79, 1987–88, 1991–92, 1992–93, 1993–94, 1995–96
- Serie B: 1980–81, 1982–83
- Supercoppa Italiana: 1988, 1992, 1993, 1994
- European Cup/UEFA Champions League: 1988–89, 1989–90, 1993–94
- Mitropa Cup: 1981–82
- European Super Cup: 1990, 1994
- Intercontinental Cup: 1989, 1990

Italy

- FIFA World Cup: 1982; runner-up: 1994; third place: 1990
- Scania 100 Tournament: 1991

Individual

- Serie A Team of The Year: 1987, 1988, 1989, 1990, 1992
- Ballon d'Or Runner-up: 1989
- Coppa Italia Top Scorer: 1989–90
- Guerin d'Oro: 1989–90
- FIFA World Cup All-Star Team: 1990
- Onze de Onze: 1990, 1991, 1992
- Premio Nazionale Carriera Esemplare "Gaetano Scirea": 1994
- World Soccer The Greatest Players of the 20th Century No. 19
- AC Milan Player of the Century: 1999
- AIC Serie A Player of the Century: 2000
- FIFA 100: 2004
- UEFA Golden Jubilee Poll: #17th
- AC Milan Hall of Fame
- FICTS Hall of Fame and Excellence Guirlande d'Honneur
- Golden Foot: 2012 (Under the Category of "Football Legend")
- Italian Football Hall of Fame: 2013
- Ballon d'Or Dream Team (Silver): 2020
- IFFHS All-Time Men's Dream Team: 2021
- IFFHS Legends

Orders

- 4th Class / Officer: Ufficiale Ordine al Merito della Repubblica Italiana: 1991

== See also ==
- List of one-club men in association football
