= 1988 Supercoppa Italiana =

- Event: Supercoppa Italiana
AC Milan	Sampdoria
Serie A	Coppa Italia
3	1
- Date: 14 June 1989
- Venue: San Siro, Milan, Italy
- Referee: Pietro D'Elia
- Attendance: 19,412

The 1988 Supercoppa Italiana was a match played by the 1987–88 Serie A winners AC Milan and 1987–88 Coppa Italia winners Sampdoria. It took place on 14 June 1989 at the San Siro in Milan, Italy, and was the first edition of the trophy. AC Milan won the match 3–1.

Although originally scheduled for August 1988, it was played in June 1989, due to the 1988 Summer Olympics being held in the same period.

== Match details ==
14 June 1989

AC Milan	3–1	Sampdoria
Rijkaard 18'; Mannari 72'; Van Basten 90' (pen.)	Report	Vialli 14'

San Siro, Milan, Italy
Attendance: 19,412
Referee: Pietro D'Elia

AC Milan	Sampdoria

MILAN:
GK	1	(Italy) Giovanni Galli
DF	2	(Italy) Mauro Tassotti
DF	3	(Italy) Alessandro Costacurta
MF	4	(Italy) Angelo Colombo
DF	5	(Italy) Filippo Galli	(substituted off) 86'
DF	6	(Italy) Franco Baresi (c)
MF	7	(Italy) Christian Lantignotti	(substituted off) 46'
MF	8	(Netherlands) Frank Rijkaard
FW	9	(Netherlands) Marco van Basten
MF	10	(Italy) Carlo Ancelotti
FW	11	(Italy) Alberico Evani
Substitutes:
GK	12	(Italy) Davide Pinato
DF	13	(Italy) Roberto Mussi	(substituted on) 86'
FW	14	(Italy) Graziano Mannari	(substituted on) 46'
FW	15	(Italy) Massimiliano Cappellini
Manager:
(Italy) Arrigo Sacchi

SAMPDORIA:
GK	1	(Italy) Gianluca Pagliuca
DF	2	(Italy) Marco Lanna
DF	3	(Italy) Amedeo Carboni
MF	4	(Italy) Fausto Pari	(substituted off) 73'
DF	5	(Italy) Pietro Vierchowod	(substituted off) 57'
DF	6	(Italy) Luca Pellegrini (c)
MF	7	(Spain) Víctor Muñoz
MF	8	(Italy) Fulvio Bonomi
FW	9	(Italy) Gianluca Vialli
MF	10	(Italy) Fausto Salsano
FW	11	(Italy) Giuseppe Dossena
Substitutes:
GK		unknown
MF	14	(Italy) Roberto Breda	(substituted on) 73'
FW	16	(Italy) Loris Pradella	(substituted on) 57'
DF		" unknown"
		unknown
Manager:
(Socialist Federal Republic of Yugoslavia) Vujadin Boškov

MATCH OFFICIALS

- Assistant referees:
- Fourth official:

MATCH RULES

- 90 minutes.
- 30 minutes of extra-time if necessary.
- Penalty shoot-out if scores still level.
- Five named substitutes
- Maximum of 2 substitutions.

== See also ==
- 1994 Supercoppa Italiana - played between same teams
- 1988–89 AC Milan season
- 1988–89 UC Sampdoria season
