= Francesco Antonioli =

Italian footballer (born 1969)

Personal information
- Full name: Francesco Stefano Antonioli
- Date of birth: 14 September 1969 (age 57)
- Place of birth: Monza, Italy
- Height: 1.88 m (6 ft 2 in)
- Position: Goalkeeper

Youth career
- Milan

Senior career*
Years	Team	Apps	(Gls)
1986–1988	Monza	23	(0)
1988–1994	AC Milan	13	(0)
1990	→ Cesena (loan)	0	(0)
1990–1991	→ Modena (loan)	30	(0)
1993–1994	→ Pisa (loan)	26	(0)
1994–1995	Reggiana	30	(0)
1995–1999	Bologna	103	(0)
1999–2003	Roma	102	(0)
2003–2006	Sampdoria	104	(0)
2006–2009	Bologna	119	(0)
2009–2012	Cesena	106	(0)
Total		656	(0)

International career
1989–1992	Italy U21	23	(0)
1992	Italy Olympic	6	(0)

Managerial career
- 2018–2019: Cesena (assistant)
Medal record
Men's football
Representing Italy
UEFA European Championship
Runner-up	2000 Belgium–Netherlands
- * Club domestic league appearances and goals

Francesco Stefano Antonioli Cavaliere OMRI (born 14 September 1969) is an Italian former footballer who played as goalkeeper. He was the oldest footballer in Serie A until his club Cesena was relegated to Serie B at the end of the 2011–12 season, after which he retired from professional football. Antonioli began his club career with Monza and played for several Italian clubs throughout his career, winning titles with AC Milan, Bologna and Roma. Despite never being capped at senior international level, he was an unused member of the Italy squad that took part in Euro 2000, reaching the final. At youth level, he represented Italy at the 1992 Summer Olympics.

== Club career ==
Born in Monza, Italy, Antonioli developed as a player in the youth ranks of AC Milan. He was later loaned out to Monza, making his professional debut with the club in 1986, at the age of 16, in a 1–0 defeat to Juventus in the Coppa Italia. He also made his Milan debut in the Coppa Italia, in a 2–1 home win over Lazio, on 3 September 1988, and made his Serie A debut with the club on 18 April 1992, in a 1–0 win over cross-city rivals Inter. Due to some promising performances, he was brought to the Milan starting lineup at the beginning of the 1992–93 season, featuring in Milan's 2–1 victory over Parma in the 1992 Supercoppa Italiana; however, a string of mistakes, including a dreadful fumble in the Milan derby, which gifted Luigi de Agostini a soft goal, allowed Sebastiano Rossi to reclaim his starting spot in goal. Milan won the league title that season, also reaching the final of the UEFA Champions League. Antonioli made his final appearance for Milan on 29 November 1992, in 1–0 away win over Juventus, in Serie A, making 27 appearances for the club in total.

After joining Bologna in 1995, he became the undisputed first-choice keeper for the club (apart from the 1997–98 season, during which he backed up Giorgio Sterchele); he immediately helped the club obtain Serie A promotion, winning the 1995–96 Serie B title, later helping Bologna to win the 1998 UEFA Intertoto Cup, and subsequently reach the semi-finals of the 1998–99 UEFA Cup and the Coppa Italia. In 1999, he joined Roma for 10 billion Italian lire and in 2001, he won a Scudetto and a Supercoppa Italiana with AS Roma, also reaching the final of the Coppa Italia in 2003.

In the summer of 2003, Antonioli joined Sampdoria on a free transfer. In 2006–07, with Luca Castellazzi's emergence between the posts, Antonioli left for former club Bologna on another free transfer.

He led Bologna to win Serie A promotion once again in mid-2008.

After the end of 2008–09 season, he was released and replaced by U21 internationals Emiliano Viviano. Antonioli then joined Serie B newcomer AC Cesena in July, and the club sent the former first choice Nicola Ravaglia to the lower division. He was the first choice ahead Michele Tardioli. Antonioli was also the protagonist of the club's second consecutive promotion in 2010, thus having another chance of top-flight football at the age of 41 in the 2010–11 Serie A season. The team survived from relegation battle by finishing 15th, and he was offered a new 1-year contract.

== International career ==
Antonioli never debuted for the senior side, but was selected in the Italy squad that finished second at Euro 2000, as third-choice goalkeeper, behind Gianluigi Buffon and Francesco Toldo. When Gianluigi Buffon, injured himself in an international friendly warm-up a few days before the beginning of the tournament, Antonioli became second-choice ahead of Buffon's replacement in the squad Christian Abbiati. He did not play, however, with Toldo starting in goal, as Italy reached the final, losing 2–1 to France on a golden goal.

Antonioli was the first-choice goalkeeper of the Italy national under-21 football team that won the 1992 UEFA European Under-21 Championship; with the Italian squad, he also took part in the 1992 Olympic Games.

== Style of play ==
An experienced and authoritative presence in goal, Antonioli was regarded as one of Italy's most talented and promising goalkeepers in his youth, although several pundits consider him to have failed to realise his potential due to several injuries as well as his character. Due to his elegant playing style, shot-stopping abilities, reflexes, and excellent goalkeeping technique, he was capable of producing spectacular, decisive, and stylish saves. However, his style of goalkeeping was predominantly efficient, and was inspired by that of his role model Giovanni Galli. Known for his penalty–saving abilities, with 14 stops in 416 appearances between 1992 and 2012, he has parried the joint–seventh–most penalties in Serie A history, alongside Stefano Sorrentino.

== Career statistics ==
Appearances and goals by club, season and competition
Club	Season	League			National cup		League cup		Other		Total	
Club	Season	Division	Apps	Goals	Apps	Goals	Apps	Goals	Apps	Goals	Apps	Goals
Monza	1986–87	Serie C1	2	0	2	0	—		—		4	0
Monza	1987–88	Serie C1	21	0	2	0	—		—		23	0
Monza	Total		23	0	4	0	—		—		27	0
AC Milan	1988–89	Serie A	0	0	1	0	0	0	0	0	1	0
AC Milan	1989–90	Serie A	0	0	0	0	0	0	0	0	0	0
AC Milan	1991–92	Serie A	4	0	7	0	—		—		11	0
AC Milan	1992–93	Serie A	9	0	1	0	4	0	1	0	15	0
AC Milan	Total		13	0	9	0	4	0	1	0	27	0
Cesena (loan)	1990–91	Serie A	0	0	1	0	—		—		1	0
Modena (loan)	1990–91	Serie B	30	0	2	0	—		—		32	0
Pisa (loan)	1993–94	Serie B	26	0	0	0	—		1	0	27	0
Reggiana	1994–95	Serie A	30	0	4	0	—		—		34	0
Bologna	1995–96	Serie B	38	0	6	0	—		—		44	0
Bologna	1996–97	Serie A	33	0	6	0	—		—		39	0
Bologna	1998–99	Serie A	32	0	8	0	16	0	2	0	58	0
Bologna	Total		103	0	20	0	16	0	2	0	141	0
Roma	1999–2000	Serie A	30	0	4	0	8	0	—		42	0
Roma	2000–01	Serie A	26	0	2	0	6	0	—		34	0
Roma	2001–02	Serie A	30	0	2	0	10	0	0	0	42	0
Roma	2002–03	Serie A	16	0	2	0	9	0	—		27	0
Roma	Total		102	0	10	0	33	0	0	0	145	0
Sampdoria	2003–04	Serie A	32	0	0	0	—		—		32	0
Sampdoria	2004–05	Serie A	37	0	1	0	—		—		38	0
Sampdoria	2005–06	Serie A	35	0	0	0	2	0	—		37	0
Sampdoria	Total		114	0	1	0	2	0	—		117	0
Bologna	2006–07	Serie B	42	0	3	0	—		—		45	0
Bologna	2007–08	Serie B	42	0	2	0	—		—		44	0
Bologna	2008–09	Serie A	35	0	1	0	—		—		36	0
Bologna	Total		119	0	6	0	—		—		125	0
Cesena	2009–10	Serie B	39	0	2	0	—		—		41	0
Cesena	2010–11	Serie A	37	0	0	0	—		—		37	0
Cesena	2011–12	Serie A	30	0	1	0	—		—		31	0
Cesena	Total		106	0	3	0	—		—		109	0
Career total			656	0	60	0	55	0	3	0	774	0

== Honours ==
Milan

- Serie A: 1991–92, 1992–93
- European Cup: 1988–89, 1989–90
- Intercontinental Cup: 1989, 1990
- European Super Cup: 1989, 1990
- Supercoppa Italiana: 1988, 1992, 1993

Bologna

- Serie B: 1995–96
- UEFA Intertoto Cup: 1998

Roma

- Serie A: 2000–01
- Supercoppa Italiana: 2001

Italy

- UEFA European Championship runner-up: 2000

Orders

5th Class / Knight: Cavaliere Ordine al Merito della Repubblica Italiana: 2000
