= UEFA Golden Jubilee Poll =

Online poll conducted in 2004 by UEFA

The UEFA Golden Jubilee Poll is the popular name for an online poll conducted in 2004 by UEFA as part of their Golden Jubilee celebrations, celebrating the best European footballers from the fifty previous years. The poll, available on UEFA's website, asked respondents to pick their ten favorite players from each of the five previous decades, from a shortlist of 250 players. Over 150,000 people responded, producing over seven million votes. Zinedine Zidane topped the poll narrowly from Franz Beckenbauer. Italian players featured most frequently with ten nominations, edging out German players with eight nominations.

== Full results ==
	Player	Nation	Votes
1	Zinedine Zidane	France	123,582
2	Franz Beckenbauer	Germany	122,569
3	Johan Cruyff	Netherlands	119,332
4	Marco Van Basten	Netherlands	117,987
5	Dino Zoff	Italy	114,529
6	Alfredo Di Stéfano	Argentina; Spain	107,435
7	Eusébio	Portugal; Mozambique	103,937
8	Lev Yashin	Russia	101,862
9	Michel Platini	France	99,380
10	Paolo Maldini	Italy	95,497
11	Ferenc Puskás	Hungary; Spain	94,361
12	Paolo Rossi	Italy	91,194
13	Ruud Gullit	Netherlands	91,001
14	Bobby Charlton	England	89,921
15	Lothar Matthäus	West Germany; Germany	86,798
16	Karl-Heinz Rummenigge	West Germany	86,649
17	Franco Baresi	Italy	83,800
18	Gerd Müller	West Germany	82,668
19	George Best	Northern Ireland	79,036
20	Kevin Keegan	England	78,840
21	Frank Rijkaard	Netherlands	71,333
22	David Beckham	England	71,299
23	Bobby Moore	England	70,884
24	Roberto Baggio	Italy	68,239
25	Michael Laudrup	Denmark	67,484
26	Ronald Koeman	Netherlands	66,661
27	Peter Schmeichel	Denmark	66,463
28	Gheorghe Hagi	Romania	62,383
29	Sepp Maier	West Germany	62,375
30	Oliver Kahn	Germany	58,151
31	Luís Figo	Portugal	58,078
32	Raúl	Spain	56,880
33	Berti Vogts	West Germany	55,398
34	Johan Neeskens	Netherlands	54,796
35	Gianni Rivera	Italy	53,874
36	José Antonio Camacho	Spain	53,873
37	Marco Tardelli	Italy	53,732
38	Just Fontaine	France	53,612
39	Peter Shilton	England	50,841
40	Bernd Schuster	West Germany	50,247
41	Raymond Kopa	France	49,504
42	Eric Cantona	France	48,436
43	Stanley Matthews	England	47,915
44	Ruud van Nistelrooy	Netherlands	47,398
45	Valentin Ivanov	Soviet Union	46,022
46	Gary Lineker	England	44,787
47	Alessandro Nesta	Italy	44,667
48	José Santamaría	Uruguay; Spain	43,690
49	Alessandro Del Piero	Italy	43,227
50	Alessandro Costacurta	Italy	42,511

== See also ==
- FIFA 100
- UEFA Jubilee Awards
- UEFA Club Football Awards
