= Davide Pinato =

Italian footballer (born 1964)

Personal information
- Date of birth: 15 March 1964 (age 62)
- Place of birth: Monza, Italy
- Height: 1.86 m (6 ft 1 in)
- Position: Goalkeeper

Youth career
- 1983–1985: Monza

Senior career*
Years	Team	Apps	(Gls)
1985–1988	Monza	55	(0)
1988–1989	AC Milan	2	(0)
1989–1990	Monza	37	(0)
1990–1991	Atalanta	0	(0)
1991–1992	Piacenza	28	(0)
1992–2002	Atalanta	73	(0)
2002–2003	Sampdoria	0	(0)
- * Club domestic league appearances and goals

Davide Pinato (born 15 March 1964) is an Italian former professional footballer who played as a goalkeeper. He now works as a goalkeeping coach. As of the 2017–18 season, he holds the 7th best Italian football record for the longest consecutive run without conceding a goal in Serie A, which he managed during the 1997–98 season, with Atalanta.

== Playing career ==
=== Monza and Milan ===
Born in Monza, Pinato started his career at hometown club Monza. He entered into first team in summer 1985, after Monza's relegation to Serie B. He played 14 times during the 1985–86 season, and he later overtook the Alberto Torresin as the club's starting goalkeeper at the beginning of the 1986–87 season. During the 1987–88 season, his regular place was taken by Francesco Antonioli. He won promotion with club in the summer of 1988, and was personally given a chance to move to AC Milan, along with Antonioli; Monza acquired Giulio Nuciari in return. At Milan, Giovanni Galli was the regular starter, and Pinato only played twice that season, as Milan won the European Cup.

Pinato returned to Monza in the summer of 1989, which was also to be his last spell at the club, due to their relegation to Serie C1 in the summer of 1990. In his last Monza season, after Nuciari's departure, his only competitor were Luca Pellini and young youth product, Ivan Aiardi; Pinato played almost all of the club's Serie B games.

=== Atalanta and later career ===
At Atalanta, he was initially the understudy to Fabrizio Ferron during the 1990–96 seasons, therefore missing out on a starting spot during his physical prime. He was sent on loan to Piacenza Calcio during the 1991–92 season, and secured a regular place in the starting line-up over Rino Gandini. When Ferron left in the summer of 1996, Pinato became the regular starter, keeping the new signing Davide Micillo on the bench. The following season, Alberto Fontana arrived, and Pinato was once again relegated to the bench, despite having managed what is currently the 7th longest consecutive run without conceding a goal in Serie A, and the 4th best at the time, during the 1997–98 season, setting a 757-minute unbeaten streak. Fontana left in January 2001, but Pinato was too old to compete for a regular starting place with the young rising star Ivan Pelizzoli. Pelizzoli left in summer 2001 to Roma, but Pinato could only secure five games from new signing Massimo Taibi. He played his last Serie A match against Udinese on 3 March 2002, at the age of 37 years, 353 days.

In the summer of 2002, Pinato left Atalanta, signing with Serie B club U.C. Sampdoria, where he played the last season of his career as the backup of Luigi Turci, who had been Udinese's goalkeeper the previous season, Pinato's last opponent in Serie A.

== Coaching career ==
Following his retirement, Pinato pursued a career as a goalkeeping coach with Milan.

== Honours ==
A.C. Milan

- European Cup: 1988–89

Atalanta

- Serie A promotion (Serie B fourth place): 1994–95, 1999–2000

Monza

- Serie B promotion (Serie C1 runner-up): 1987–88
