= Frank Rijkaard =

Dutch footballer and manager (born 1962)

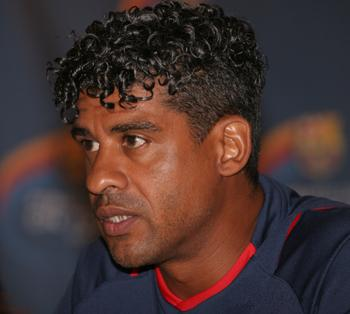
- Rijkaard in 2006

Personal information
- Full name: Franklin Edmundo Rijkaard
- Date of birth: 30 September 1962 (age 64)
- Place of birth: Amsterdam, Netherlands
- Height: 1.90 m (6 ft 3 in)
- Position: Defensive midfielder

Youth career
- –1973: SC Buitenveldert
- 1973–1976: Blauw-Wit Amsterdam
- 1976–1979: DWS
- 1979–1980: Ajax

Senior career*
Years	Team	Apps	(Gls)
1980–1987	Ajax	206	(46)
1987–1988	Sporting CP	0	(0)
1987–1988	→ Real Zaragoza (loan)	11	(0)
1988–1993	AC Milan	142	(16)
1993–1995	Ajax	56	(12)
Total		415	(74)

International career
1981–1994	Netherlands	73	(10)

Managerial career
- 1998–2000: Netherlands
- 2001–2002: Sparta Rotterdam
- 2003–2008: Barcelona
- 2009–2010: Galatasaray
- 2011–2013: Saudi Arabia
Medal record
Men's football
Representing Netherlands
UEFA European Championship
Winner	1988
Third place	1992
- * Club domestic league appearances and goals

Franklin Edmundo Rijkaard (Dutch pronunciation: [ˈfrɑŋklɪn ˈɛtmundoː ˈfrɑŋk ˈrɛikaːrt]; born 30 September 1962) is a Dutch former football manager and player who primarily played as a defensive midfielder. He is regarded as one of the greatest midfielders of all time.

Rijkaard played for Ajax, Real Zaragoza and AC Milan. With Ajax, he won five Eredivisie titles and the 1994–1995 Champions League. With AC Milan, he won two Serie A titles, as well as the 1988–89 and 1989–90 European Cup (Champions League) titles.

Rijkaard earned 73 caps for the Netherlands national team. He was part of the team that won the 1988 European championship and finished third in the 1992 European championship. He also played in the 1990 and 1994 World Cups.

In his managerial career, he is most well known for his five-year tenure at Barcelona where he won the 2004–05 and 2005–06 La Liga titles, as well as the 2005–06 Champions League, their first since 1992. He has also managed the Netherlands national team, Sparta Rotterdam, Galatasaray and the Saudi Arabia national team.

== Playing career ==
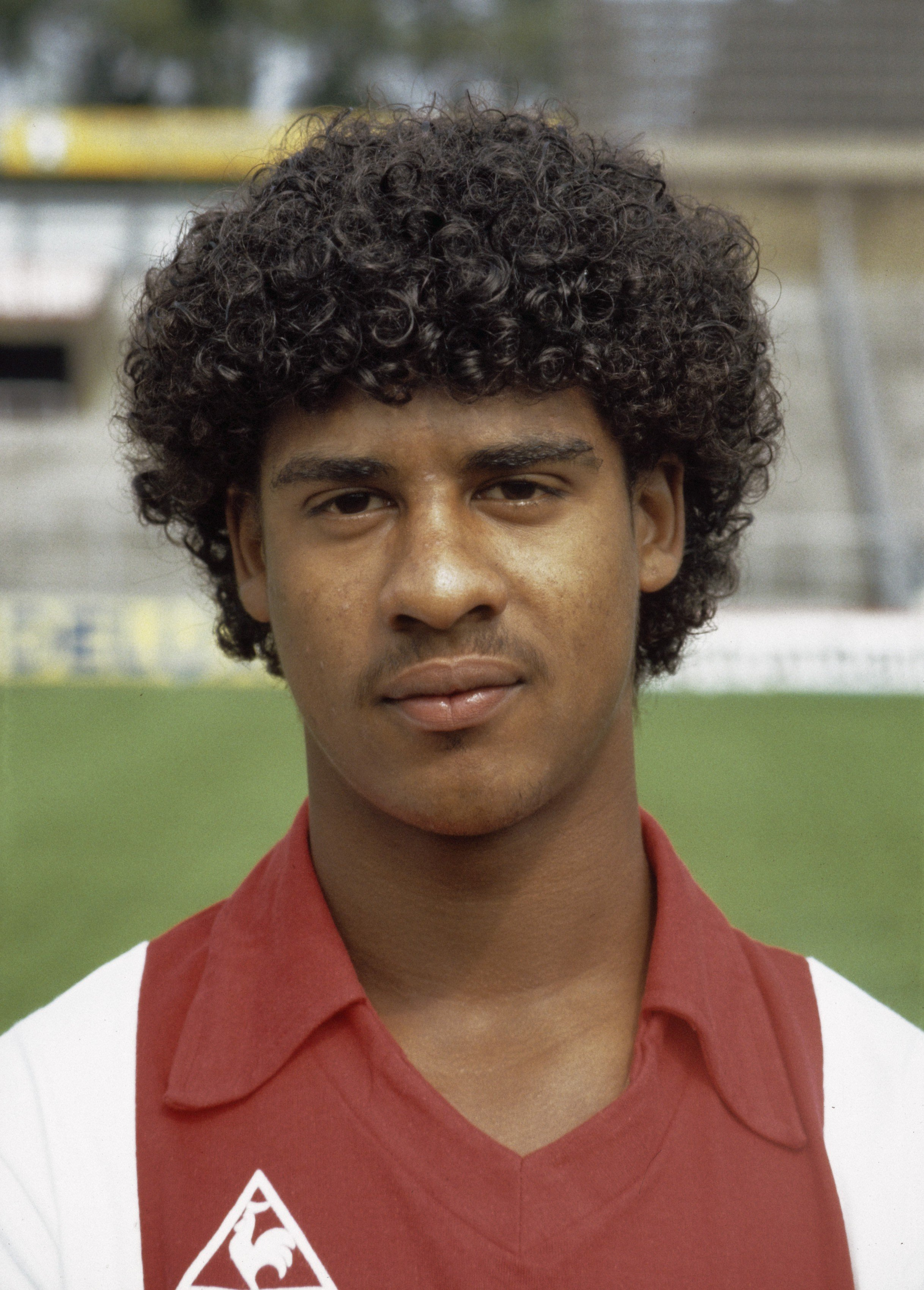
Rijkaard with Ajax in July 1981

=== Ajax ===
Rijkaard was born in Amsterdam. His father Herman (1935–2010) was a Surinamese footballer who arrived in the Netherlands along with the father of Ruud Gullit and his mother Neel is Dutch; the two boys grew up playing football together in the city. Rijkaard was just 17 when Ajax coach Leo Beenhakker gave him his senior squad debut on 23 August 1980. He made an immediate impact, scoring the third goal in a 4–2 away victory over Go Ahead Eagles, the first league match in the 1980–81 season. He would play another 23 games for Ajax in his first season, netting four goals. In 1981–82, he won his first league championship with Ajax and went on to successfully defend the title the following season.

Rijkaard stayed at Ajax for seven-and-a-half seasons. During this period, he won the Dutch league championship three times (1981–82, 1982–83, 1984–85) and the Dutch Cup three times (1982–83, 1985–86, 1986–87). In the 1986–87 season, he won the Cup Winners' Cup with Ajax over Lokomotiv Leipzig, winning 1–0.

=== Sporting and Zaragoza ===
In September 1987, what would have been Rijkaard's third season (1987–88) under Dutchman Johan Cruyff as head coach, Rijkaard stormed off the training field and vowed never to play under him again. He was subsequently signed by Sporting CP, but he signed too late to be eligible to play in any competition. He was immediately loaned out to Real Zaragoza, but upon completing his first season at Zaragoza was signed by AC Milan. During his time at Zaragoza, Rijkaard met Cruyff again, who had become manager of Barcelona in May 1988, and the two settled their dispute shortly after.

=== AC Milan ===
Rijkaard played for five seasons at Milan. Playing alongside fellow country-men Marco van Basten and Ruud Gullit, Rijkaard won the European Cup twice (in 1989 against Steaua București and 1990, against Benfica) and the domestic Serie A championship twice. In the 1990 European Cup Final, he scored the only goal to win the cup for Milan.

=== Return to Ajax ===
After five seasons in Italy, Rijkaard returned to Ajax in 1993. With Louis van Gaal at the helm, Rijkaard and Danny Blind formed the experienced defensive core of the Ajax team that won the first two of three consecutive Dutch championships. Ajax were the unbeaten champions of the Netherlands in the 1994–95 season, and carried that success into Europe. In his final game, Rijkaard won the Champions League with a 1–0 victory over his former club Milan in the 1995 final at the Ernst-Happel-Stadion in Vienna, providing the assist for Patrick Kluivert, who scored the only goal of the match.

== International career ==
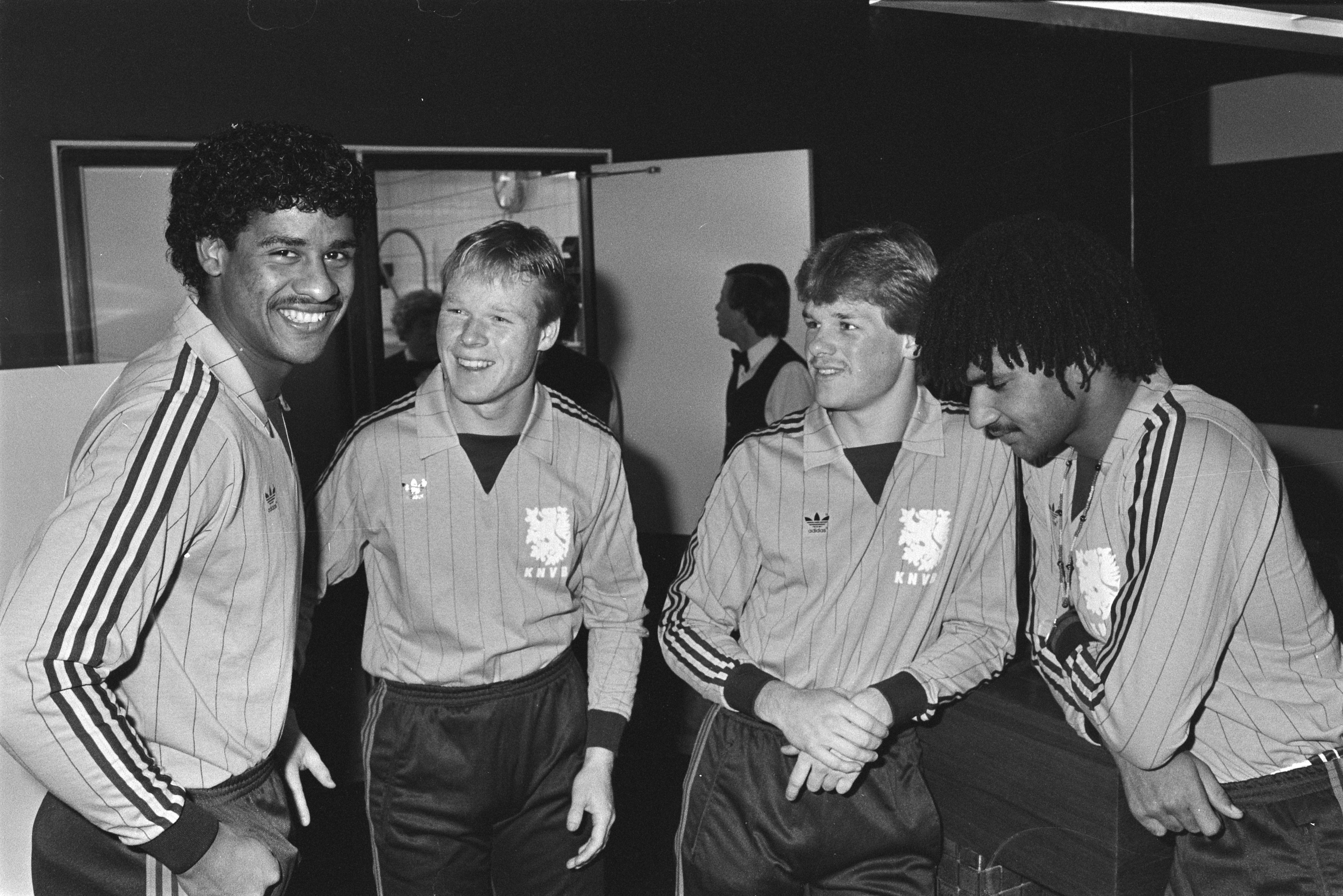
From left: Rijkaard with Ronald Koeman, Erwin Koeman and Ruud Gullit in the Dutch national team in 1983

In 1981, Rijkaard debuted for the Netherlands national football team during a friendly match against Switzerland. He was part of the Dutch side that won UEFA Euro 1988 with a 2–0 victory in the final against the Soviet Union, playing at centre-back alongside Ronald Koeman.

At UEFA Euro 1992, Rijkaard set up Dennis Bergkamp's only goal of the match in the Netherlands' opening victory against Scotland, and scored the opening goal in a 3–1 victory over Germany in their final first round match, which allowed them to top their group. At the semi-final stage against eventual champions Denmark, after setting up Bergkamp's opening goal, Rijkaard scored a late equalizer for the Netherlands in a 2–2 draw, but the Dutch went out on penalties, despite Rijkaard successfully netting his spot-kick. In the quarter-finals of the 1994 FIFA World Cup, he made his final appearance for the Netherlands in the 3–2 defeat against eventual winners Brazil.

=== Spitting incident ===
Rijkaard was the cause of an incident with Rudi Völler when West Germany played the Netherlands in the second round of the 1990 FIFA World Cup. Rijkaard was booked for a tackle on Völler and, as Rijkaard took up position for the free kick, he spat in Völler's hair. Völler complained to the referee and was booked as well. From the resulting free kick, Völler then handled the ball and then went to the ground (according to his own account) to avoid a collision with Dutch keeper Hans van Breukelen, while others, notably Rijkaard and van Breukelen, saw Voller's handball and his resulting action as a dive in hopes for a penalty. Van Breukelen was angry at this but Rijkaard, already annoyed by Völler's previous antics, again confronted the West German by twisting his ear and stamping on his foot. Argentine referee Juan Carlos Loustau sent off both Rijkaard and Völler. As he jogged back to the entrance tunnel, Rijkaard again spat in Völler's hair as they left the pitch. Germany won the match 2–1 and eventually went on to win the tournament. The German press nicknamed him "Llama" for his spitting. Rijkaard would later apologise for his behaviour to Völler, who accepted.

== Style of play and reception ==
Regarded as one of the greatest players ever in his position, Rijkaard was a quick, strong, complete and tenacious defensive midfielder, who was praised by pundits throughout his career for his physical and athletic attributes, his work rate, positioning, his acute tactical intelligence and decision-making, as well as his outstanding consistency and ability to read the game. Due to his aggression and versatility, he was also capable of playing as a central or box-to-box midfielder, and even in a defensive role, usually in the centre. Although Rijkaard was known as a strong tackler, he was surprisingly elegant for a player of his size, and also possessed good technique, passing ability, link-up play, and vision, which made him adept at starting attacking plays as a deep-lying playmaker once he won back possession. He was also capable of playing in more advanced roles as an attacking midfielder or second striker. Due to his height and physical strength, he excelled in the air; possessed a powerful shot; and was capable of getting forward and contributing to his team's attacking plays by making late runs into the penalty area. Rijkaard was described by British broadsheet The Daily Telegraph as having been "a stylish player of faultless pedigree". In 2004, Rijkaard was named in the FIFA 100, Pelé's list of the 125 World's Greatest Living Footballers.

== Managerial career ==
=== Netherlands ===
Rijkaard worked as assistant to Guus Hiddink with the Netherlands national team during the 1998 World Cup; this was his first experience of coaching, as he had taken a break from football after retiring as a player. At the World Cup, the Netherlands lost the semi-final to Brazil on penalties. When Hiddink resigned as manager, Rijkaard was chosen as his replacement, although he was not first choice.

As the Netherlands were joint hosts of UEFA Euro 2000, they did not take part in the qualifiers, playing only friendlies for two years. In Rijkaard's first game, the Netherlands beat Peru 2–0. Between October 1998 and November 1999, they did not win a single game, drawing nine and losing to Morocco and Brazil.

At Euro 2000, the Dutch team topped the group with three wins; 1–0 against the Czech Republic, 3–0 against Denmark and 3–2 against France. In the quarter-final, they beat Yugoslavia 6–1, breaking the record for the biggest win at a European Championship. The Netherlands played some of the best football of the tournament, but lost their semi-final match to ten-man Italy on penalties, having also missed two penalties in regular time; Rijkaard resigned immediately afterwards. It was rumoured that he would move to Italy to coach his former club Milan, but this did not happen.

=== Sparta Rotterdam ===
During the 2001–02 season, he became manager of Sparta Rotterdam in the Eredivisie, the oldest professional team in the country. Rijkaard said that he enjoyed the down-to-earth atmosphere, although the club was not financially strong. Under his leadership, Sparta played in the relegation playoff and finished bottom, relegating the club to the second division for the first time in its history.

Rijkaard resigned after their relegation, having received a death threat.

=== Barcelona ===
==== First years ====
Rijkaard was not out of a coaching role for long, and less than a year after leaving Sparta, he was appointed manager of Barcelona for the 2003–04 season, with Albert Roca and Henk ten Cate as assistants. The season would prove to be a watershed for the club, but not without initial instability. Rijkaard arrived at the club as it entered a new phase, having elected a new president in Joan Laporta and a new managerial board, but with fans unhappy that Laporta had let English midfielder David Beckham snub the chance to join the club. For Rijkaard, the team he inherited, with the exception of new superstar signing Ronaldinho (who was the club's second choice after Beckham), also consisted of many underachieving players from the old guard and era that failed to meet the club and its fans' demands to match archrival Real Madrid's success in the early 2000s, having not won a trophy since 1999.

Rijkaard had a disappointing start at Barcelona that saw some sections of the club's fans call for his resignation, and he drew flak from the media when the team lost to Real Madrid in December 2003. Rijkaard's resilience won through and from 2004 onwards, he achieved a massive turnaround, as the team went from strength to strength. Barcelona finished runners-up in La Liga in 2003–04, having been close to the relegation zone at one point in the earlier stages of the season. Rijkaard then took Barcelona to the next level as he phased out the old guard and rebuilt a new-look side around Ronaldinho, with new players like Deco, Samuel Eto'o, Rafael Márquez and Ludovic Giuly, along with the latest promotion of some young players from the previous era trained in the club's youth teams, including Víctor Valdés, Lionel Messi and Andrés Iniesta. He eventually succeeded in turning around the fortunes of the club, with the strong support of Laporta, and within the next couple of years finally managed to win La Liga both in 2004–05 and in 2005–06.

==== Champions League title and after ====
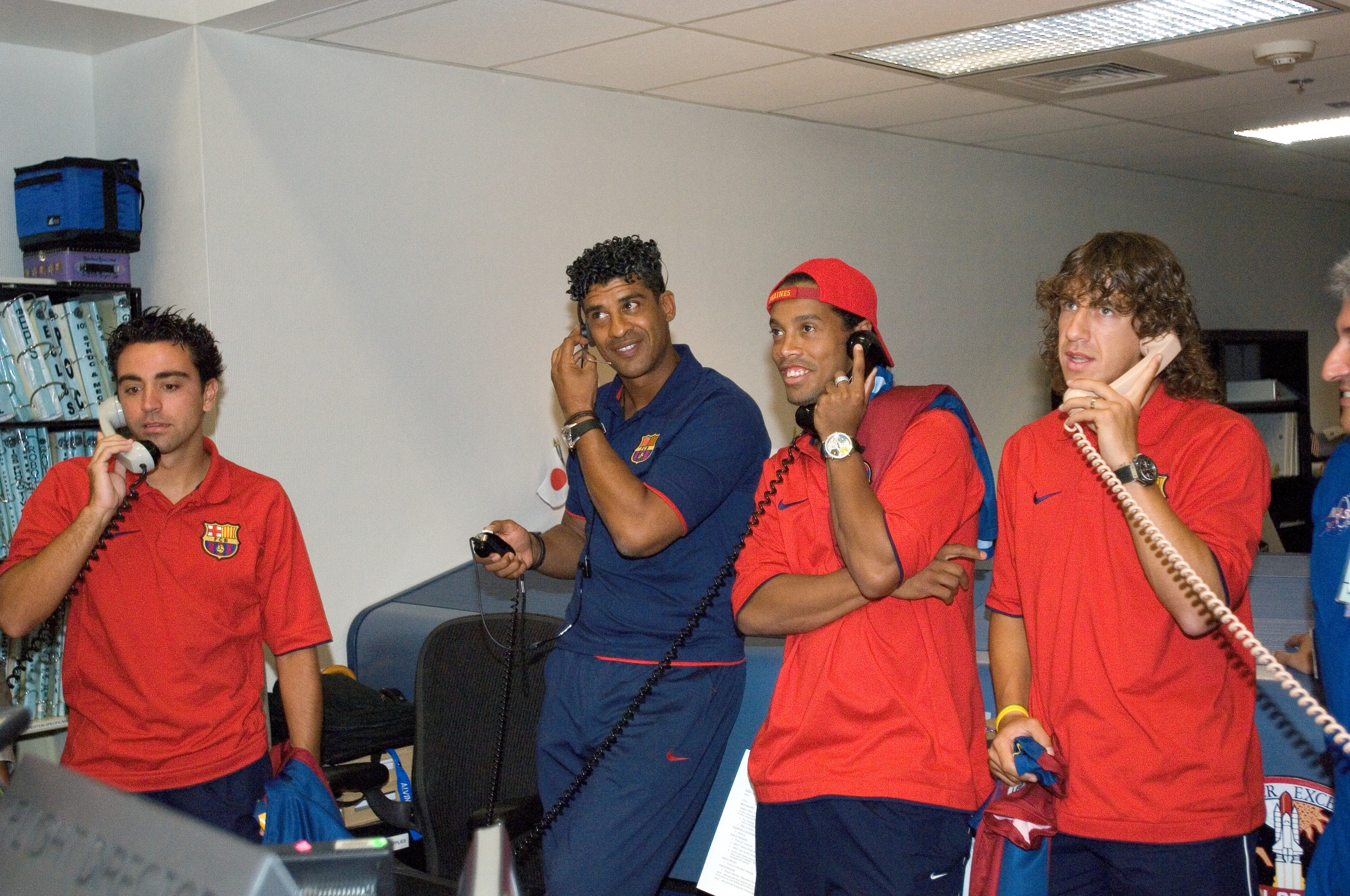
Rijkaard (second from left) with Xavi, Ronaldinho and Puyol at NASA in 2006

Rijkaard became the first Barcelona coach to have won twice at Real Madrid's Santiago Bernabéu Stadium, an achievement which even successful managers like Johan Cruyff, Louis van Gaal and Luis Aragonés were unable to accomplish. His no-nonsense policy on and off the field, and the sparkling football played by his team, won him many plaudits and Rijkaard was among the five nominated coaches for UEFA's Team of the Year 2005. On 8 March 2006, he was also honoured by UEFA for his contributions to the European Cup competition throughout his career as player and manager.

Rijkaard also achieved success on the European stage, winning the 2005–06 Champions League with a 2–1 win against Arsenal in the final. Barcelona had been losing 1–0 for most of the match before his late tactical substitutions proved the decisive factor, as the introduction of Henrik Larsson and Juliano Belletti contributed directly to Barcelona's two goals. The win made him the fifth individual to have won the European Cup both as a player and as a manager, alongside Miguel Muñoz, Giovanni Trapattoni, Johan Cruyff and Carlo Ancelotti, a feat later achieved also by his eventual successor, Pep Guardiola and then Zinedine Zidane.

After losing to Manchester United in the semi-final of the 2007–08 Champions League, Rijkaard was asked whether he would quit at the end of the season, since he had not won anything for two successive seasons. He replied, "I have no intention of leaving. It would be different if the players were saying it is time for me to go but that is not the case." On 1 May 2008, it was reported that Rijkaard allegedly confided to a colleague that he would be stepping down as Barcelona manager at the end of the season, but 24 hours later, he stated in a press conference that he had no intention of leaving the club.

On 8 May 2008, the day after Barcelona's dismal 4–1 defeat to archrivals Real Madrid, Barcelona president Joan Laporta announced that at the end of the 2007–08 season, Rijkaard would no longer be head coach of the first team. Laporta made the announcement after a board meeting, and Rijkaard was succeeded by Pep Guardiola. Laporta made it clear that Rijkaard's achievements "made history" and praised him for his time at the club.

=== Galatasaray ===
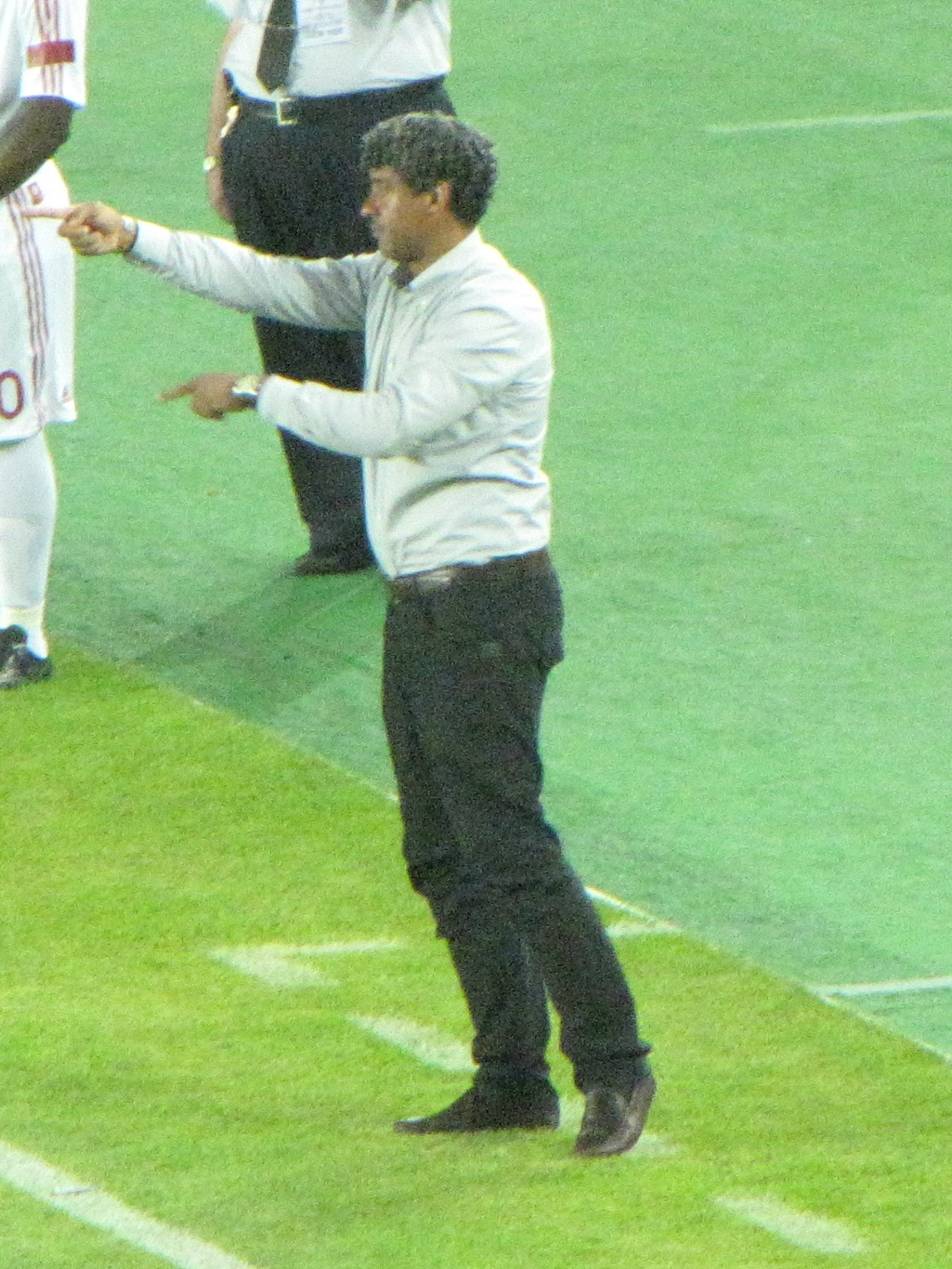
Rijkaard coaching Galatasaray in 2009

On 5 June 2009, Rijkaard signed a two-year contract to manage the Turkish Süper Lig team Galatasaray, following the resignation of Bülent Korkmaz two days earlier. He was sacked on 19 October 2010 and was replaced with Gheorghe Hagi.

=== Saudi Arabia ===
On 28 June 2011, it was announced that Rijkaard would be head coach of the Saudi Arabia national team after a deal was reached with the Saudi Arabia Football Federation. Saudi Arabia were eliminated in the third round of 2014 FIFA World Cup qualification after a 4–2 away defeat to Australia in their last match on 29 February, finishing third in their group.

The 21st Arabian Gulf Cup was the second competition for Rijkaard with Saudi Arabia. The Saudis left the competition at the group stage after losing 2–0 against Iraq, a 2–0 win against Yemen and 1–0 defeat against Kuwait. On 16 January 2013, Rijkaard was dismissed under a confidential contractual termination penalty clause following Saudi Arabia's exit at the tournament.

=== Later career ===
In 2013, Florida prep school Montverde Academy hired Rijkaard as their advisor of player development.

In December 2016, Rijkaard announced he would no longer pursue a position as manager.

== Coaching philosophy and style ==
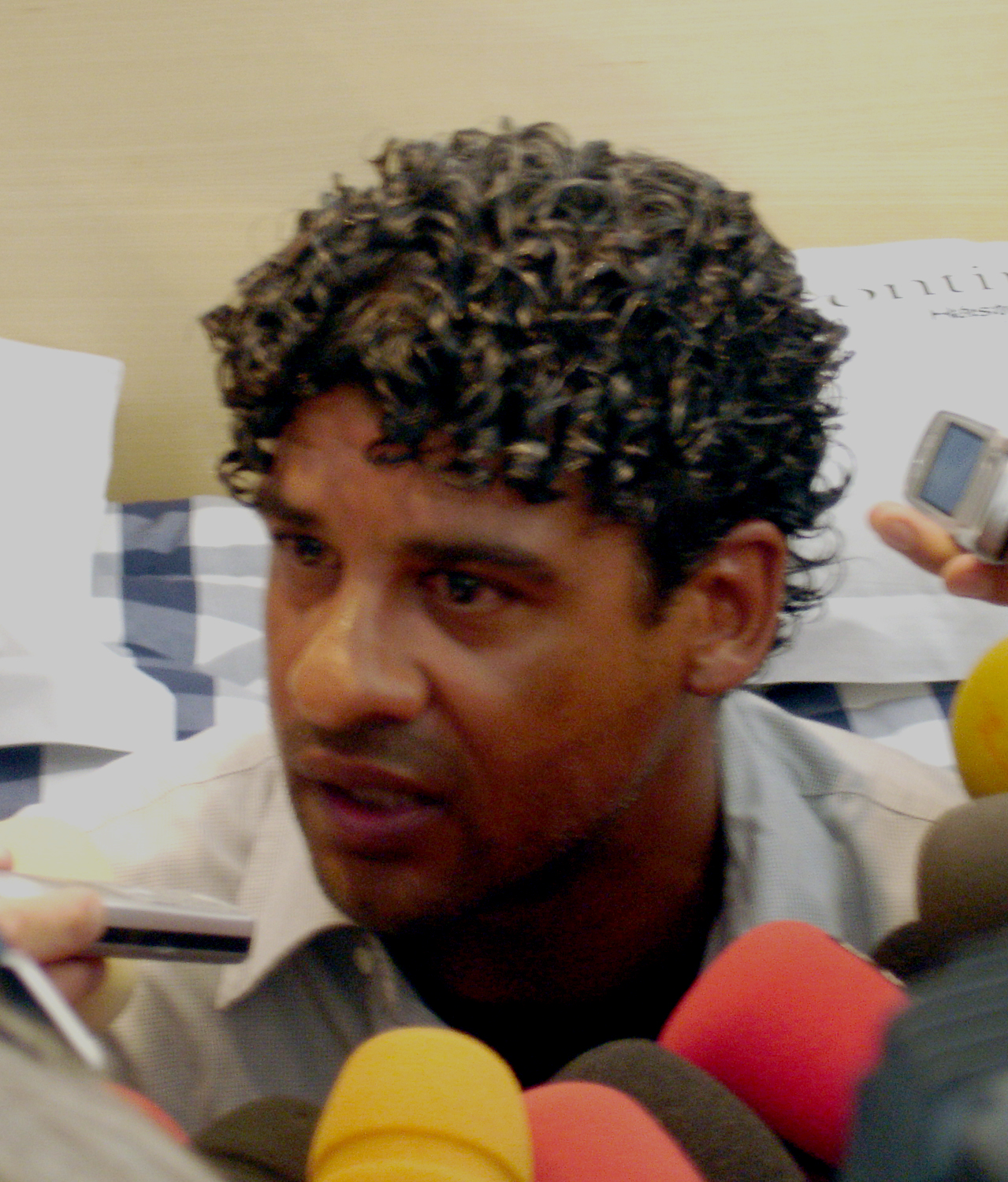
Rijkaard in 2007

As a coach, Rijkaard's essential philosophy is to guide his team towards playing attack-minded football as a cohesive unit. In doing this, he believes a team can achieve the dual objectives of winning games and ensuring the audience's enjoyment of the spectacle. This follows in the best coaching traditions of Rijkaard's countrymen and forebears Rinus Michels and Johan Cruyff. In this light, it is notable that Michels coached both Cruyff and Rijkaard during their respective participations with the Dutch national team, and that Cruyff himself went on to coach Rijkaard. Nonetheless, Rijkaard believes in working within a contemporary football context and is not out to imitate the styles and tactics of past masters. In his own words:

you gain many impressions from the past. You still have it in your mind when you become a coach, and if something happens you can recall how it was dealt with. But I strongly believe that you cannot copy anyone. The decisions that a great coach made years ago will not necessarily work today.

Rijkaard has evidently learned to curb the quick temper of his playing days and is often a portrait of calm and stability in training and along the touchline. He rarely courts controversy in the media and is more apt now to promote a positive environment and let his team's play speak for itself when faced with intense rivalry or criticism. The tactics used during his tenure as manager of Barcelona best exemplify Rijkaard's commitment to playing stylish attacking football. During the team's 2004–05 and 2005–06 campaigns, the coach frequently fielded a 4–3–3 formation, a system which encouraged the flair and creativity of the players in the front third of the field and created optimal interplay between the midfielders and forwards during attacks, with Ronaldinho being the focal point of the team's offence. Within this system, the four defenders also tended to play in a relatively high position on the pitch to support the midfield, which frequently advanced to participate in the attack. The team generally focuses on maintaining possession in the opponents' half of the field, applying pressure in order to force the opposition to make errors in defense and offensive counter-attacking.

== Personal life ==
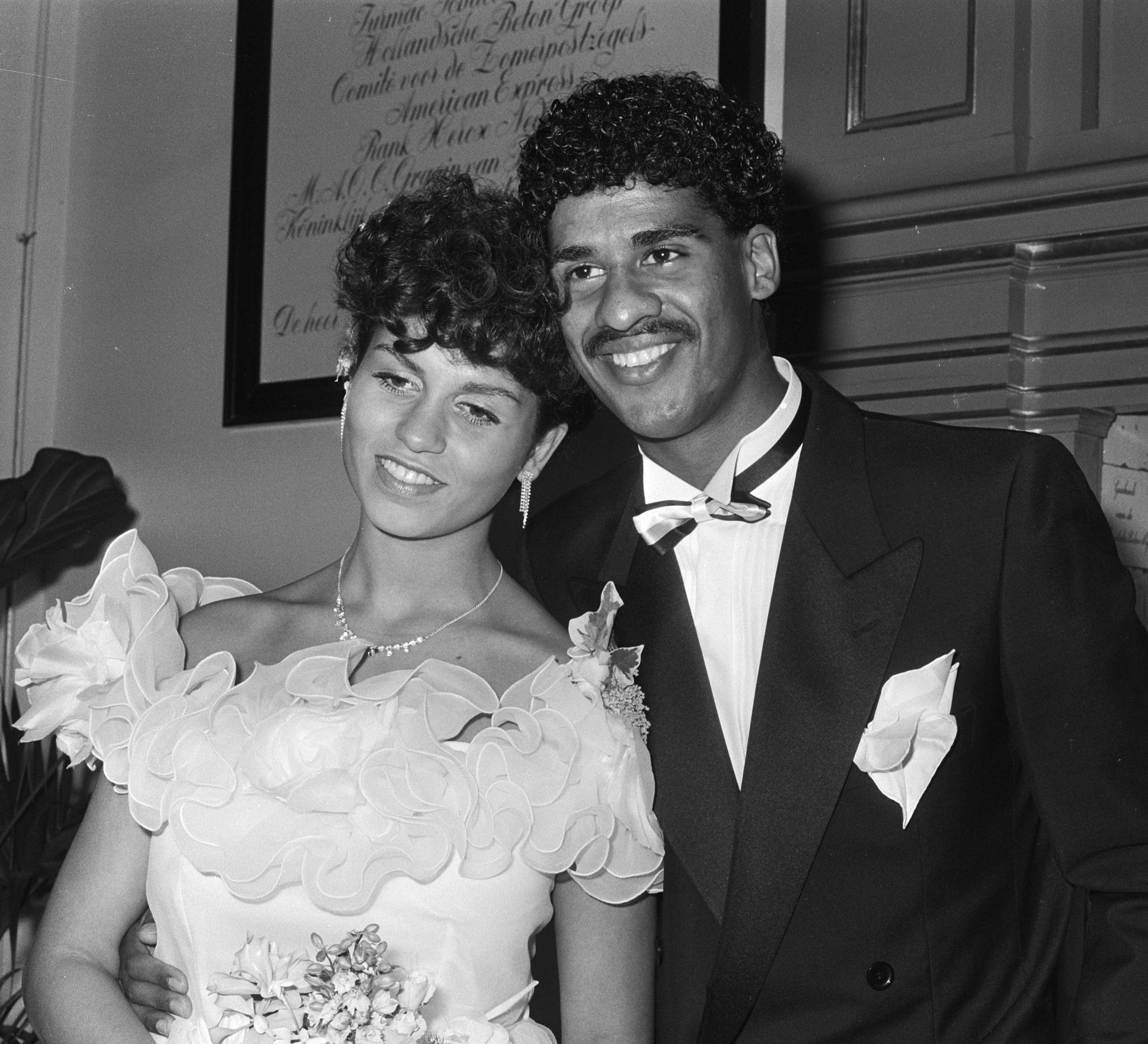
Frank Rijkaard and Carmen Sandries getting married on 10 October 1985

Rijkaard comes from a football-playing family. He is the son of Herman Rijkaard, a former footballer who played for Robinhood in the Surinamese Hoofdklasse, before immigrating to the Netherlands, where he played in the Dutch Eredivisie for Blauw-Wit. His older brother, Herman Rijkaard Jr., is a FIFA certified players' agent who represents various players internationally. Twice divorced, he is currently married to Stephanie and has four children.

== Media ==
Rijkaard features in EA Sports' FIFA video game series; he was featured in the FIFA 14, FIFA 15, FIFA 16 and FIFA 17 Ultimate Team Legends. For FIFA 18, FIFA 19, FIFA 20, FIFA 21, FIFA 22 and FIFA 23 he appeared as an ICON player in FIFA Ultimate Team (FUT). He is also featured in Konami's EFootball, as both a manager and a player.

Since his retirement as manager in 2016, Rijkaard keeps a low profile in the media, and he only comes in the public eye for events hosted by the Johan Cruyff Foundation.

== Career statistics ==
=== Club ===
Appearances and goals by club, season and competition
Club	Season	League			National cup (Note: Includes KNVB Cup, Coppa Italia)		Europe		Other		Total	
Club	Season	Division	Apps	Goals	Apps	Goals	Apps	Goals	Apps	Goals	Apps	Goals
Ajax	1980–81	Eredivisie	24	4	6	0	1 (Note: Appearances in European Cup)	1	–		31	5
Ajax	1981–82	Eredivisie	27	4	1	0	0	0	–		28	4
Ajax	1982–83	Eredivisie	25	3	6	1	0	0	–		31	4
Ajax	1983–84	Eredivisie	23	9	3	1	1	0	–		27	10
Ajax	1984–85	Eredivisie	34	7	4	1	4 (Note: Appearances in UEFA Cup)	1	–		42	9
Ajax	1985–86	Eredivisie	31	9	6	4	2	0	–		39	13
Ajax	1986–87	Eredivisie	34	7	7	0	9 (Note: Appearances in European Cup Winners' Cup)	2	–		50	9
Ajax	1987–88	Eredivisie	8	3	0	0	1	1	–		9	4
Ajax	Total		206	46	33	7	18	5	0	0	257	58
Sporting CP	1987–88	Primeira Divisão	–		–		–		–		0	0
Zaragoza	1987–88	La Liga	11	0	0	0	–		–		11	0
Milan	1988–89	Serie A	31	4	6	0	9	1	1 (Note: Appearance in Supercoppa Italiana)	1	47	6
Milan	1989–90	Serie A	29	2	6	0	9	2	3 (Note: Two appearances in UEFA Super Cup, one appearance in Intercontinental Cup)	0	47	4
Milan	1990–91	Serie A	30	3	2	0	4	0	3 (Note: Two appearances in UEFA Super Cup, one appearance, two goals in Intercontinental Cup)	3	39	6
Milan	1991–92	Serie A	30	5	5	0	–		–		35	5
Milan	1992–93	Serie A	22	2	5	0	6 (Note: Appearances in UEFA Champions League)	3	0	0	33	5
Milan	Total		142	16	24	0	28	6	7	4	201	26
Ajax	1993–94	Eredivisie	30	10	4	0	6	1	1 (Note: Appearance in Dutch Supercup)	0	41	11
Ajax	1994–95	Eredivisie	26	2	2	0	10	0	1	0	39	2
Ajax	Total		56	12	6	0	16	1	2	0	80	13
Career total			415	74	63	7	62	12	9	4	549	97

=== International ===
Appearances and goals by national team and year
National team	Year	Apps	Goals
Netherlands	1981	1	0
Netherlands	1982	5	0
Netherlands	1983	3	2
Netherlands	1984	2	0
Netherlands	1985	5	0
Netherlands	1986	4	0
Netherlands	1987	4	0
Netherlands	1988	10	0
Netherlands	1989	5	0
Netherlands	1990	7	1
Netherlands	1991	3	0
Netherlands	1992	11	3
Netherlands	1993	4	0
Netherlands	1994	9	4
Total		73	10

Scores and results list the Netherlands' goal tally first, score column indicates score after each Rijkaard goal.

List of international goals scored by Frank Rijkaard
No.	Date	Venue	Opponent	Score	Result	Competition
1	17 December 1983	De Kuip, Rotterdam, Netherlands	Malta	3–0	5–0	UEFA Euro 1984 qualifier
2	17 December 1983	De Kuip, Rotterdam, Netherlands	Malta	5–0	5–0	UEFA Euro 1984 qualifier
3	3 June 1990	Stadion Maksimir, Zagreb, Yugoslavia	Yugoslavia	1–0	2–0	Friendly
4	27 May 1992	De Baandert, Sittard, Netherlands	Austria	1–0	3–2	Friendly
5	18 June 1992	Ullevi, Gothenburg, Sweden	Germany	1–0	3–1	UEFA Euro 1992
6	22 June 1992	Ullevi, Gothenburg, Sweden	Denmark	2–2	2–2	UEFA Euro 1992
7	19 January 1994	Stade El Menzah, Tunis, Tunisia	Tunisia	1–1	2–2	Friendly
8	1 June 1994	De Kuip, Rotterdam, Netherlands	Hungary	5–1	7–1	Friendly
9	1 June 1994	De Kuip, Rotterdam, Netherlands	Hungary	6–1	7–1	Friendly
10	12 June 1994	Varsity Stadium, Toronto, Canada	Canada	3–0	3–0	Friendly

== Managerial statistics ==
As of 16 January 2013

Team	From	To	Record				
Team	From	To	G	W	D	L	Win %
Netherlands	June 1998	July 2000	22	8	12	2	36.36
Sparta Rotterdam	June 2001	May 2002	38	6	12	20	15.79
Barcelona	July 2003	May 2008	273	160	63	50	58.61
Galatasaray	5 June 2009	20 October 2010	67	37	15	15	55.22
Saudi Arabia	28 June 2011	16 January 2013	27	7	9	11	25.93
Total			427	218	111	98	51.05

== Honours ==
=== Player ===
Ajax

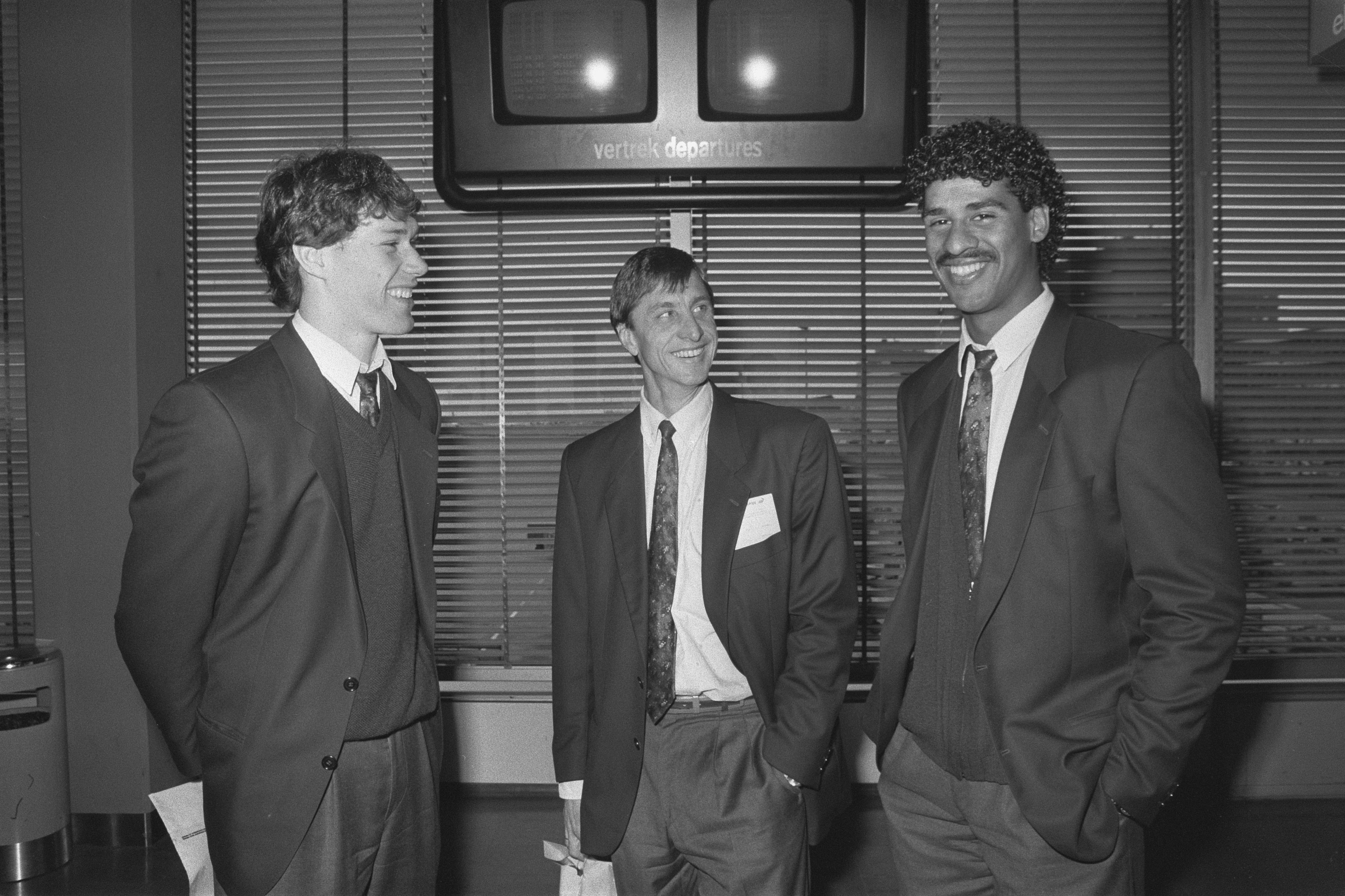
Rijkaard with Van Basten and their coach at Ajax, Johan Cruyff in 1986.

- Eredivisie: 1981–82, 1982–83, 1984–85, 1993–94, 1994–95
- KNVB Cup: 1982–83, 1985–86, 1986–87; runner-up: 1980–81
- Dutch Supercup: 1993, 1994
- UEFA Champions League: 1994–95
- European Cup Winners' Cup: 1986–87

AC Milan

- Serie A: 1991–92, 1992–93
- Supercoppa Italiana: 1988
- European Cup/UEFA Champions League: 1988–89, 1989–90; runner-up: 1992–93
- European Super Cup: 1989, 1990
- Intercontinental Cup: 1989, 1990

Netherlands

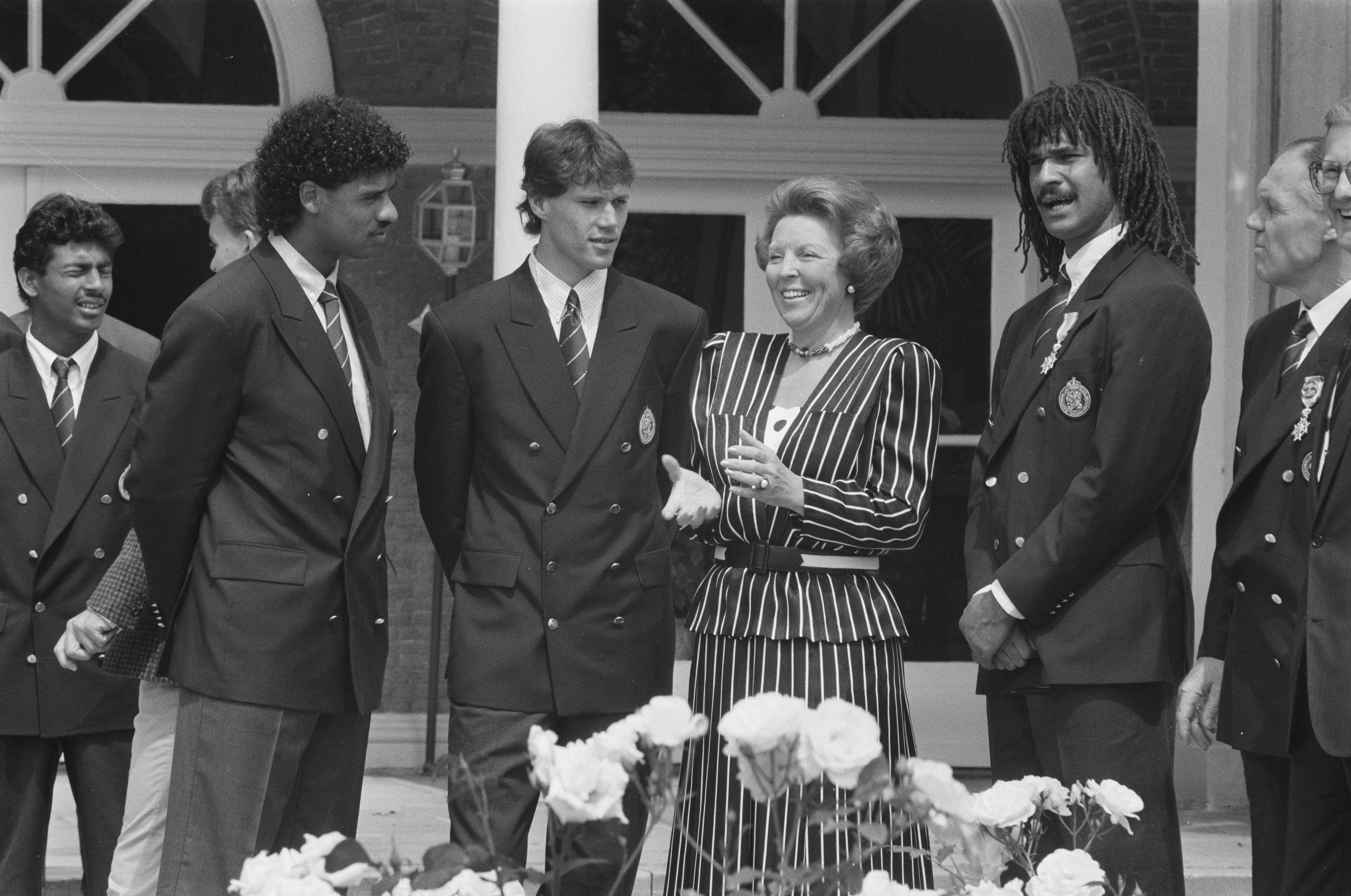
From left to right: Winter, Rijkaard, Van Basten, Queen Beatrix, Gullit, and Michels, upon returning to the Netherlands after winning the 1988 European Championship.

- UEFA European Championship: 1988

Individual

- Dutch Golden Shoe: 1985, 1987
- UEFA European Championship Team of the Tournament: 1988
- Ballon d'Or – Third place: 1988, 1989
- Onze Mondial: 1988, 1989, 1990, 1992, 1995
- World XI: 1989, 1992
- Intercontinental Cup Most Valuable Player of the Match Award: 1990
- Serie A Best foreign player: 1992
- Serie A Footballer of the Year: 1992
- ESM Team of the Year: 1994–95
- FIFA 100
- UEFA Golden Jubilee Poll: #21
- UEFA President's Award: 2005
- AC Milan Hall of Fame
- World Soccer: The 100 Greatest Footballers of All Time
- Ballon d'Or Dream Team (Silver): 2020

=== Manager ===
Barcelona

- La Liga: 2004–05, 2005–06
- Supercopa de España: 2005, 2006
- UEFA Champions League: 2005–06
- FIFA Club World Cup runner-up: 2006

Individual

- Don Balón Coach of the Year: 2004–05, 2005–06
- UEFA Manager of the Year: 2005–06
- UEFA Team of the Year for Best Coach of the Year: 2006
- IFFHS World's Best Club Coach: 2006
- Onze d'Or Coach of the Year: 2006
