= Christian Lantignotti =

Italian footballer (born 1970)

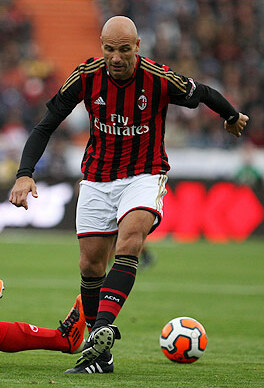

Personal information
- Date of birth: 18 March 1970 (age 56)
- Place of birth: Milan, Italy
- Height: 1.77 m (5 ft 10 in)
- Position: Midfielder

Senior career*
Years	Team	Apps	(Gls)
1988–1990	Milan	10	(0)
1990–1991	Reggiana	36	(3)
1991–1993	Cesena	53	(6)
1993–1994	Reggiana	26	(1)
1994–1996	Cagliari	35	(2)
1996–1998	Padova	50	(9)
1998–1999	Treviso	28	(5)
1999–2001	Monza	33	(11)
2001–2002	Siena	3	(0)
2003–2004	Forlì	29	(13)
2004–2005	Bellaria Igea Marina	37	(7)
2006	Forlì	10	(2)
2006–2007	Cesenatico		
2007–2008	Sporting NovaValmarecchia		
2008–2009	Cattolica		
2009	Pennarossa	4	(1)
2009	Sanvitese		

International career
1989–1991	Italy U-21	10	(0)
- * Club domestic league appearances and goals

Christian Lantignotti (born 18 March 1970) is an Italian retired professional footballer who played as a midfielder.

== Career ==
Throughout his career, Lantignotti played 5 seasons (71 games, 3 goals) in the Italian Serie A for A.C. Milan, A.C. Reggiana 1919, and Cagliari Calcio.

== Honours ==
Milan

- Supercoppa Italiana winner: 1988.
- European Cup winner: 1988–89, 1989–90.
- UEFA Super Cup winner: 1989.
- Intercontinental Cup winner: 1989.
