= Graziano Mannari =

Italian footballer

Personal information
- Date of birth: 19 April 1969 (age 57)
- Place of birth: Livorno, Italy
- Height: 1.74 m (5 ft 8 1/2 in)
- Position: Striker

Youth career
- Milan

Senior career*
Years	Team	Apps	(Gls)
1986–1989	Milan	18	(3)
1989–1990	Como	22	(3)
1990–1991	Parma	12	(0)
1991	Avellino	0	(0)
1991–1992	Siena	25	(1)
1992	Pisa	8	(0)
1992–1993	Ravenna	2	(0)
1993	Parma	0	(0)
1993–1994	Fiorenzuola	11	(0)
1994	Siena	6	(0)
1994–1995	Pistoiese	13	(2)
1995–1997	Pontedera	48	(6)
1999–2001	Sorianese		
2002–2003	Acquaviva		
- * Club domestic league appearances and goals

Graziano Mannari (born 19 April 1969 in Livorno) is a retired Italian professional footballer, who played as a forward, either as a centre-forward, or as a winger.

== Career ==
Throughout his career, Mannari played for 3 seasons (30 games, 3 goals) in the Serie A, for A.C. Milan and Parma F.C.

His most memorable matches for Milan came on the 12 March 1989, in a 4–0 league win against Juventus FC, in which he scored two goals, and in the club's 1988 Supercoppa Italiana victory, in which he also scored.

In 1989, he was called up to the Italy national under-21 football team, but remained on the bench for the two games he was on the roster.

== Honours ==
Milan

- Serie A champion: 1987–88.
- Supercoppa Italiana winner: 1988.
- European Cup winner: 1988–89.
