= Massimiliano Cappellini =

Italian footballer (born 1971)

Personal information
- Date of birth: 2 January 1971 (age 55)
- Place of birth: Bollate, Italy
- Height: 1.78 m (5 ft 10 in)
- Position: Striker

Senior career*
Years	Team	Apps	(Gls)
1987–1992	Milan	5	(0)
1989	→ Monza (loan)	5	(0)
1990–1992	→ Piacenza (loan)	74	(14)
1992	→ Atalanta (loan)	0	(0)
1992–1993	→ Como (loan)	15	(14)
1993–1995	Foggia	49	(13)
1995–1996	Piacenza	28	(2)
1996–2005	Empoli	231	(39)

International career
1987–88	Italy U-16	5	(4)
- * Club domestic league appearances and goals

Massimiliano Cappellini (born 2 January 1971, in Bollate) is a retired Italian professional footballer who played as a forward.

== Club career ==
Cappellini played 9 seasons (161 games, 25 games) in the Serie A for A.C. Milan, U.S. Foggia, Piacenza Calcio and Empoli F.C.; he also had loan spells in Serie B and Serie C with Monza, Piacenza, Atalanta, and Como.

He made his Serie A debut with Milan during the 1987–88 season, on 28 February 1988, in a 2–1 home win against Sampdoria; Milan finished the season as Serie A champions. During the 1988–89 season, he made his debut in the European Cup, as a substitute in the second leg of the round of 16 tie against Red Star Belgrade, which Milan won on penalties; Milan went on to win the title that season. His final appearance for the club came in a 5–1 home win over Ascoli in the league that season, on 18 June 1989.

After struggling to compete for a place in the Milan first team, due to the presence of many established star forwards, Cappellini spent the first half of the 1989–90 season on loan with Serie B side Monza, but was later loaned to Piacenza for the second-half of the season, where he remained for three seasons. During 1990–91 season, he helped Piacenza win the league title and achieve promotion to Serie B, scoring 7 goals.

He was then loaned out to Serie A side Atalanta in the second half of the following season, but failed to make a single appearance for the club due to competition from other forwards. In September 1992, he was loaned out again to Como, where he scored 14 goals in 15 matches during the 1992–93 Serie C1 season, although he finished the season with an injury.

Milan subsequently sold Cappellini to Foggia in the summer of 1993, where he remained for two seasons, helping the side avoid relegation under manager Zdeněk Zeman in his first season, but he was unable to save from relegation the following season.

He returned to Piacenza in 1995, scoring only two goals in 28 appearances (most of which came from the substitute bench) during the 1995–96 Serie A season, as Piacenza avoided relegation to Serie B.

In 1996, he joined Serie B side Empoli, where he ended his career after nine seasons (four in Serie A and five in Serie B). He scored 16 goals during the 1996–97 Serie B season, helping Empoli achieve promotion to Serie A; the following season, he scored a personal best of nine goals in Serie A. At the beginning of the 1998–99 season, he suffered a serious knee injury, which forced him to take on more of a second striker role; Empoli were relegated to Serie B. He remained with the club until the 2004–05 season, winning the Serie B title, and helping the club achieve promotion to Serie A once again through his leadership.

== International career ==
Although he was never capped at senior international level, Cappellini represented Italy at youth level at the 1987 FIFA U-16 World Championship, where they finished in fourth place, with Cappellini scoring 2 goals in the tournament. In total he scored 4 goals in 5 appearances for the Italy U-16 side between 1987 and 1988. He also received a call-up for the Italy U-18, and five call-ups for the Italy Olympic side for the 1993 Mediterranean Games, but never played any matches for either of those teams.

== After retirement ==
Following his retirement from professional football, Cappellini became a team manager with Empoli. In December 2010, he became the general manager of Spezia, a position which he held until 2011, when he returned to Empoli to become director of the club's youth sector.

== Honours ==
=== Club ===
Milan

- Serie A: 1987–88
- European Cup: 1988–89

Piacenza

- Serie C1: 1990–91

Empoli

- Serie B: 2004–05
