= 1985–86 AC Milan season =

Milan
1985–86 season
- Owner: Giuseppe "Giussi" Farina (until 19 February 1986); Silvio Berlusconi
- President: Giuseppe "Giussi" Farina (until 12 January 1986); Rosario Lo Verde (until 23 March 1986); Silvio Berlusconi
- Manager: Nils Liedholm
- Stadium: San Siro
- Serie A: 7th
- Coppa Italia: Round of 16
- UEFA Cup: Round of 16
- Top goalscorer: League: Mark Hateley (8); All: Pietro Paolo Virdis (16)
- Average home league attendance: 56,782
Home colours	Away colours

During the 1985–86 season, Milan Associazione Calcio competed in Serie A, Coppa Italia and UEFA Cup.

== Summary ==
The summer of 1985 saw the purchase from Juventus of the world champion and 1982 Ballon d'Or Paolo Rossi, who formed an attacking trident with Virdis and Hateley.

On a corporate level, the 1985–86 season was troubled for Milan: in December, president Giuseppe "Giussi" Farina, following the elimination in the round of 16 of the UEFA Cup at the hands of the Belgians of Waregem, suffered a harsh dispute from the fans. With the arrival of the new year, the company is overloaded with debts and risks bankruptcy if they are not repaid. In this situation, Farina resigned and various consortia alternated: Rosario Lo Verde was elected to the presidency of Milan, waiting for a new buyer, and remained at the helm of the company as regent for just 51 days (this made him the shortest lasting chairman in the club's history).

On 20 February 1986, the Milanese entrepreneur Silvio Berlusconi, owner of Fininvest, bought the team, settling the debt of several billion lire and saving the club from bankruptcy; on 24 March he became chairman. Berlusconi confers the function of CEO of Milan to Adriano Galliani and hired Ariedo Braida as sporting director.

In the meanwhile, the team had started the championship well, cruising for the entire first half of the season between second and third position behind leaders Juventus. Milan then suffered a performance drop (obtaining one point in five games) and missed out on a place in the UEFA Cup by finishing in seventh place, one point behind Inter.

In the Coppa Italia, Milan got through the first round finishing their group in second place with 7 points thanks to victories against Cagliari, Reggiana and Arezzo, a draw with Genoa and a defeat against Udinese, group winners with a 3-point lead on the Rossoneri. In the round of 16, Milan faced Empoli who eliminated Milan thanks to a 1–0 victory in Tuscany and a 1–1 draw in Milan.

In the UEFA Cup, the Rossoneri beat the French side of Auxerre in the round of 64 (1–3 defeat in Auxerre and 3–0 win in Milan) and the East Germans of Lokomotive Leipzig in the round of 32 (with a 2–0 win in Milan and a 1–3 defeat in Leipzig, Milan qualified on the away goals rule). In the round of 16 Milan faced the Belgians of Waregem who eliminated the Rossoneri, drawing 1–1 at home and winning in with a comeback at San Siro (2–1 the final score). In this match, the first goal of the Belgians, that of the 1–1, originated from a disputed penalty that will trigger the violent reactions of the AC Milan fans, following which the club will be punished with two matches of disqualification from playing in the San Siro in the European cups.

Between May and June 1986 the Lega Nazionale Professionisti organized the Torneo Estivo, in which Milan were beaten by Udinese and Torino and drew with Lecce, closing their group in third place with only one point and thus being eliminated from the competition.

== Squad ==
=== Goalkeepers ===
- (Italy) Giulio Nuciari
- (Italy) Fabrizio Ferron
- (Italy) Giuliano Terraneo
- (Italy) Antonio Vettore

=== Defenders ===
- (Italy) Franco Baresi
- (Italy) Alessandro Costacurta
- (Italy) Filippo Galli
- (Italy) Roberto Lorenzini
- (Italy) Paolo Maldini
- (Italy) Carmelo Mancuso
- (Italy) Luigi Russo
- (Italy) Mauro Tassotti

=== Midfielders ===
- (Italy) Mario Bortolazzi
- (Italy) Gabriello Carotti
- (Italy) Agostino Di Bartolomei
- (Italy) Alfonso Di Marco
- (Italy) Alberigo Evani
- (Italy) Andrea Icardi
- (San Marino) Marco Macina
- (Italy) Andrea Manzo
- (England) Ray Wilkins

=== Attackers ===
- (England) Mark Hateley
- (Italy) Paolo Rossi
- (Italy) Pietro Paolo Virdis
- (Italy) Valentino Spelta

=== Transfers ===
In
Pos.	Name	from	Type
GK	Antonio Vettore	Prato	
DF	Carmelo Mancuso	Messina	
MF	Mario Bortolazzi	Fiorentina	
MF	Massimo Gadda	Reggiana	loan end
FW	Alberto Cambiaghi	Reggiana	loan end
FW	Marco Macina	Parma	
FW	Paolo Rossi	Juventus	
FW	Valentino Spelta	Sant'Angelo	

Out
Pos.	Name	To	Type
DF	Catello Cimmino	Ascoli	
MF	Sergio Battistini	Fiorentina	
MF	Massimo Gadda	Livorno	
MF	Roberto Scarnecchia	Pisa	
MF	Vinicio Verza	Verona	
FW	Salvatore Giunta	Sambenedettese	
FW	Giuseppe Incocciati	Ascoli	
FW	Alberto Cambiaghi	Varese	

== Competitions ==
=== Serie A ===
==== League table ====
Pos	Team	Pld	W	D	L	GF	GA	GD	Pts	Qualification or relegation
5	Fiorentina	30	10	13	7	29	23	+6	33	Qualification to UEFA Cup
6	Internazionale	30	12	8	10	36	33	+3	32	Qualification to UEFA Cup
7	Milan	30	10	11	9	26	24	+2	31	
8	Atalanta	30	7	15	8	27	26	+1	29	
9	Como	30	7	15	8	32	32	0	29	

Source: RSSSF.com
Rules for classification: 1) Points; 2) Head-to-head points; 3) Head-to-head goal difference; 4) Goal difference; 5) Goals scored; 6) Draw. (Note: Head-to-head record is used only after all the matches between the teams in question have been played).

==== Matches ====
8 September 1985 1	Bari	0–1	Milan	Bari
		Report	Icardi 79'

15 September 1985 2	Milan	1–0	Lecce	Milan
	Virdis 12'	Report		Stadium: San Siro

22 September 1985 3	Fiorentina	2–0	Milan	Florence
	Passarella 21'; Monelli 43'	Report		Stadium: Comunale

29 September 1985 4	Milan	3–0	Avellino	Milan
	Galli 30'; Hateley 56', 64'	Report		Stadium: San Siro

6 October 1985 5	Sampdoria	1–1	Milan	Genoa
	Vialli 58'	Report	Hateley 14'	Stadium: Luigi Ferraris

13 October 1985 6	Milan	1–0	Como	Milan
	Galli 32'	Report		Stadium: San Siro

20 October 1985 7	Milan	1–0	Torino	Milan
	Di Bartolomei 38'	Report		Stadium: San Siro

27 October 1985 8	Verona	1–0	Milan	Verona
	Elkjær 3'	Report		Stadium: Marcantonio Bentegodi

3 November 1985 9	Milan	1–0	Pisa	Milan
	Virdis 70'	Report		Stadium: San Siro

10 November 1985 10	Udinese	0–0	Milan	Udine
		Report		Stadium: Friuli

24 November 1985 11	Roma	2–1	Milan	Rome
	Conti 5'; Cerezo 36'	Report	Virdis 27' (pen.)	Stadium: Olimpico

1 December 1985 12	Milan	2–2	Inter	Milan
	Rossi 5', 89'	Report	Altobelli 29'; Brady 65' (pen.)	Stadium: San Siro

8 December 1985 13	Napoli	2–0	Milan	Naples
	Giordano 76'; Bagni 86'	Report		Stadium: San Paolo

15 December 1985 14	Milan	0–0	Juventus	Milan
		Report		Stadium: San Siro

22 December 1985 15	Atalanta	1–1	Milan	Bergamo
	Simonini 90'	Report	Virdis 76'	Stadium: Atleti Azzurri d'Italia

5 January 1986 16	Milan	0–0	Bari	Milan
		Report		Stadium: San Siro

12 January 1986 17	Lecce	0–2	Milan	Lecce
		Report	Virdis 53' (pen.); Hateley 76'	Stadium: Via del Mare

19 January 1986 18	Milan	1–0	Fiorentina	Milan
	Virdis 61' (pen.)	Report		Stadium: San Siro

26 January 1986 19	Avellino	1–1	Milan	Avellino
	F. Colomba 5' (pen.)	Report	Wilkins 84'	Stadium: Partenio

9 February 1986 20	Milan	2–2	Sampdoria	Milan
	Salsano 7' (o.g.); Wilkins 27'	Report	Vierchowod 13'; Mancini 29'	Stadium: San Siro

16 February 1986 21	Como	1–1	Milan	Como
	Borgonovo 62'	Report	Icardi 87'

23 February 1986 22	Torino	2–0	Milan	Turin
	Comi 13', 65'	Report		Stadium: Comunale

2 March 1986 23	Milan	1–1	Verona	Milan
	S. Fontolan 70' (o.g.)	Report	Galderisi 83' (pen.)	Stadium: San Siro

9 March 1986 24	Pisa	0–1	Milan	Pisa
		Report	Hateley 42'

16 March 1986 25	Milan	2–0	Udinese	Milan
	Hateley 44', 49'	Report		Stadium: San Siro

23 March 1986 26	Milan	0–1	Roma	Milan
		Report	Pruzzo 69'	Stadium: San Siro

6 April 1986 27	Internazionale	1–0	Milan	Milan
	Minaudo 77'	Report		Stadium: Giuseppe Meazza

13 April 1986 28	Milan	1–2	Napoli	Milan
	Di Bartolomei 59'	Report	Giordano 12'; Maradona 23'	Stadium: San Siro

20 April 1986 29	Juventus	1–0	Milan	Turin
	M. Laudrup 63'	Report		Stadium: Comunale

27 April 1986 30	Milan	1–1	Atalanta	Milan
	Hateley 2'	Report	Cantarutti 78'	Stadium: San Siro

==== Top scorers ====
- (England) Mark Hateley 8
- (Italy) Pietro Paolo Virdis 6
- (Italy) Agostino Di Bartolomei 2
- (Italy) Filippo Galli 2
- (Italy) Paolo Rossi 2

=== Coppa Italia ===
First round
Group 6

21 August 1985 1	Genoa	2–2	Milan	Genoa
	Faccenda 8'; Marulla 90'		68' (o.g.) Mileti; 74' Virdis	Stadium: Luigi Ferraris; Attendance: 30 000; Referee: Pairetto

25 August 1985 2	Cagliari	0–1	Milan	Cagliari
			4' Hateley	Stadium: Sant'Elia; Attendance: 45 000; Referee: D'Elia

28 August 1985 3	Milan	1–0	Reggiana	Milan
	Virdis 68'			Stadium: Giuseppe Meazza; Attendance: 23 728; Referee: D'Innocenzo

1 September 1985 4	Milan	3–1	Arezzo	Milan
	Di Bartolomei 61'; Wilkins 68'; Virdis 89'		41' Ugolotti	Stadium: Giuseppe Meazza; Attendance: 21 269; Referee: Lo Bello

4 September 1985 5	Udinese	1–0	Milan	Udine
	Carnevale 59'			Stadium: Friuli; Attendance: 33 970; Referee: Pieri

Round of 16

29 January 1986	Empoli	1–0	Milan	Empoli
	Cecconi 85'			Stadium: Carlo Castellani; Attendance: 6 000; Referee: Baldi

12 February 1986	Milan	1–1	Empoli	Milan
	Rossi 35'		53' Della Monica	Stadium: Giuseppe Meazza; Attendance: 6 624; Referee: Lo Bello

=== UEFA Cup ===
First Round

18 September 1985	(France) Auxerre	3–1	Milan	Auxerre
	Garande 32', 63'; Danio 68'		4' Virdis	Stadium: Abbé-Deschamps; Attendance: 15 000; Referee: (Scotland) McGinlay

2 October 1985	Milan	3–0	(France) Auxerre	Milan
	Virdis 30', 84'; Hateley 36'			Stadium: San Siro; Attendance: 58 364; Referee: (Belgium) Ponnet

Second Round

23 October 1985	Milan	2–0	(East Germany) Lokomotiv Leipzig	Milan
	Virdis 74' (pen.); Hateley 76'			Stadium: San Siro; Attendance: 58 803; Referee: (Austria) Wöhrer

6 November 1985	(East Germany) Lokomotiv Leipzig	3–1	Milan	Leipzig
	Moldt 6'; Leitzke 20'; Richter 75'		47' Virdis	Stadium: Zentralstadion; Attendance: 30 000; Referee: (Socialist Federal Republic of Yugoslavia) Sostarić

Round of 16

27 November 1985	(Belgium) S.V. Zulte-Waregem	1–1	Milan	Waregem
	Veyt 65'		88' Virdis	Stadium: Regenboogstadion; Attendance: 19 000; Referee: (Germany) Schmidhuber

11 December 1985	Milan	1–2	(Belgium) S.V. Zulte-Waregem	Milan
	Bortolazzi 38'		42' (pen.) Desmet; 67' Veyt	Stadium: San Siro; Attendance: 45 000; Referee: (Czechoslovakia) Christov

== Statistics ==
=== Squad statistics ===
Competition	Points	Home						Away						Total						GD
Competition	Points	G	W	D	L	Gs	Ga	G	W	D	L	Gs	Ga	G	W	D	L	Gs	Ga	GD
1985-86 Serie A	31	15	7	6	2	17	9	15	3	5	7	9	15	30	10	11	9	26	24	+2
1985-86 Coppa Italia	–	3	2	1	0	5	2	4	1	1	2	3	4	7	3	2	2	8	6	+2
Torneo Estivo del 1986	–	1	0	0	1	1	3	2	0	1	1	1	2	3	0	1	2	2	5	−3
1985-86 UEFA Cup	–	3	2	0	1	6	2	3	0	1	2	3	7	6	2	1	3	9	9	0
Total	–	22	11	7	4	29	16	24	4	8	12	16	28	46	15	15	16	45	44	+1

=== Players statistics ===
No.	Pos	Nat	Player	Total		1985-86 Serie A		1985-86 Coppa Italia		Torneo Estivo		1985-86 UEFA Cup	
No.	Pos	Nat	Player	Apps	Goals	Apps	Goals	Apps	Goals	Apps	Goals	Apps	Goals
	MF	(Italy) ITA	Bortolazzi	18	1	7	0	5	0	3	0	3	1
	DF	(Italy) ITA	Tassotti	42	0	28	0	6	0	2	0	6	0
	DF	(Italy) ITA	Baresi	30	0	20	0	4	0	3	0	3	0
	FW	(England) ENG	Hateley	30	11	22	8	4	1	0	0	4	2
	MF	(Italy) ITA	Carotti	11	0	4	0	1	0	3	0	3	0
	FW	(Italy) ITA	Cambiaghi	0	0	0	0	0	0	0	0	0	0
	DF	(Italy) ITA	Galli	32	2	22	2	4	0	0	0	6	0
	MF	(Italy) ITA	Di Marco	2	0	0	0	1	0	1	0	0	0
	MF	(Italy) ITA	Di Bartolomei	44	3	29	2	6	1	3	0	6	0
	MF	(England) ENG	Wilkins	41	3	29	2	6	1	0	0	6	0
	DF	(Italy) ITA	Lorenzini	1	0	0	0	0	0	1	0	0	0
	MF	(Italy) ITA	Manzo	15	0	13	0	2	0	0	0	0	0
	GK	(Italy) ITA	Terraneo	45	-40	30	-24	6	-5	3	-2	6	-9
	GK	(Italy) ITA	Nuciari	2	-4	0	-0	1	-1	1	-3	0	-0
	MF	(Italy) ITA	Icardi	32	2	21	2	7	0	1	0	3	0
	DF	(Italy) ITA	Russo	18	0	8	0	4	0	2	0	4	0
	DF	(Italy) ITA	Maldini	40	0	27	0	6	0	1	0	6	0
	MF	(Italy) ITA	Evani	45	0	30	0	7	0	3	0	5	0
	FY	(Italy) ITA	Macina	13	1	5	0	2	0	3	1	3	0
	FW	(Italy) ITA	Virdis	43	16	28	6	7	3	2	1	6	6
	DF	(Italy) ITA	Mancuso	10	0	4	0	3	0	3	0	0	0
	FW	(Italy) ITA	Rossi	26	3	20	2	3	1	0	0	3	0
	FW	(Italy) ITA	Spelta	3	0	2	0	0	0	1	0	0	0
	GK	(Italy) ITA	Vettore	0	0	0	-0	0	-0	0	-0	0	-0
	MF	(Italy) ITA	Zanoncelli	2	0	0	0	0	0	2	0	0	0

== Sources ==
- RSSSF – Italy 1985/86
