= 1986–87 AC Milan season =

Milan
1986–87 season
- Owner: Silvio Berlusconi
- President: Silvio Berlusconi
- Manager: Nils Liedholm (until 6 April 1987); Fabio Capello
- Stadium: San Siro
- Serie A: 5th (in UEFA Cup)
- Coppa Italia: Round of 16
- Top goalscorer: League: Pietro Paolo Virdis (17); All: Pietro Paolo Virdis (18)
- Average home league attendance: 66,210
Home colours	Away colours

During the 1986–87 season, Milan Associazione Calcio competed in Serie A and Coppa Italia.

== Summary ==
The official season began in August, with the Rossoneri concluding the group stage of the Coppa Italia in second place, behind Parma. In Serie A, despite two initial defeats, the team emerged at a distance: with the victory in Como in the last game of the first half of the season (thanks to Maldini's first goal in Serie A), Milan found themselves only three points behind leaders Napoli. Later there was a crisis of results, dropped Milan from the top positions of the standings. In the Coppa Italia, they were eliminated by Parma (after a 0–1 defeat in San Siro and a 0–0 draw in Parma): the Emilian coach was Arrigo Sacchi, alteady appointed as new coach by the management for the following season.

Meanwhile, in the league, Fabio Capello (previously assistant coach) replaced sacked coach Nils Liedholm. Guided by the goals from top-scorer Virdis, the team finished level on points with Sampdoria. Thus, a play-off was necessary to determine who would access next season's UEFA Cup. Milan won the game 1–0. At the end of the season, the team won the third edition of the Mundialito tournament.

== Squad ==
Note: Flags indicate national team as defined under FIFA eligibility rules; some limited exceptions apply. Players may hold more than one non-FIFA nationality.

Pos.	Nation	Player
GK	ITA	Giulio Nuciari
GK	ITA	Giovanni Galli
DF	ITA	Mauro Tassotti
DF	ITA	Franco Baresi
DF	ITA	Dario Bonetti
DF	ITA	Filippo Galli
DF	ITA	Roberto Lorenzini
DF	ITA	Paolo Maldini
DF	ITA	Amedeo Mangone
DF	ITA	Rufo Emiliano Verga
DF	ITA	Francesco Zanoncelli

Pos.	Nation	Player
MF	ITA	Roberto Donadoni
MF	ITA	Agostino Di Bartolomei
MF	ITA	Alberigo Evani
MF	ITA	Andrea Manzo
MF	ITA	Stefano Salvatori
MF	ITA	Giovanni Stroppa
MF	ENG	Ray Wilkins
FW	ITA	Giuseppe Galderisi
FW	ENG	Mark Hateley
FW	ITA	Pietro Paolo Virdis
FW	ITA	Daniele Massaro

=== Transfers ===
In
Pos.	Name	from	Type
MF	Roberto Donadoni	Atalanta B.C.	–
GK	Giovanni Galli	Fiorentina	–
FW	Daniele Massaro	Fiorentina	
FW	Stefano Borgonovo	Como 1907	
DF	Dario Bonetti	A.S. Roma	
DF	Catello Cimmino	Ascoli Calcio 1898 FC	–
FW	Giuseppe Galderisi	Hellas Verona	–

Out
Pos.	Name	To	Type
FW	Paolo Rossi	Hellas Verona	–
FW	Stefano Borgonovo	Como 1907	loan
DF	Alessandro Costacurta	AC Monza	loan
GK	Giuliano Terraneo	S.S. Lazio	–
GK	Antonio Vettore	Prato	–
DF	Carmelo Mancuso	Messina	–
DF	Luigi Russo	Como 1907	–
MF	Mario Bortolazzi	Parma F.C.	–
MF	Gabriello Carotti	Lanerossi Vicenza	–
MF	Andrea Icardi	Atalanta B.C.	–

== Competitions ==
=== Serie A ===
==== League table ====
Pos	Team	Pld	W	D	L	GF	GA	GD	Pts	Qualification or relegation
3	Inter Milan	30	15	8	7	32	17	+15	38	Qualification to UEFA Cup
4	Hellas Verona	30	12	12	6	36	25	+11	36	Qualification to UEFA Cup
5	Milan (Note: Milan won the UEFA Cup qualification match against Sampdoria 1–0, thus qualifying for the 1987–88 UEFA Cup.)	30	13	9	8	31	21	+10	35	Qualification to UEFA Cup
6	Sampdoria	30	13	9	8	37	21	+16	35	
7	Roma	30	12	9	9	37	31	+6	33	

Source: 1986–87 Serie A, RSSSF.com
Rules for classification: 1) Points; 2) Head-to-head points; 3) Head-to-head goal difference; 4) Goal difference; 5) Goals scored; 6) Draw. (Note: Head-to-head record is used only after all the matches between the teams in question have been played).

==== Results summary ====
Overall								Home						Away					
Pld	W	D	L	GF	GA	GD	Pts	W	D	L	GF	GA	GD	W	D	L	GF	GA	GD
30	13	9	8	31	21	+10	48	8	5	2	17	6	+11	5	4	6	14	15	−1

Source: Competitive matches

==== Results by round ====
Round	1	2	3	4	5	6	7	8	9	10	11	12	13	14	15	16	17	18	19	20	21	22	23	24	25	26	27	28	29	30	31	32
Ground	H	A	H	A	H	A	H	H	P	A	H	A	H	A	A	H	A	H	A	H	A	H	A	A	H	A	H	A	H	H	A	N
Result	L	L	W	D	D	W	W	W	P	L	W	D	D	W	W	D	L	W	W	D	W	W	L	D	L	L	W	L	W	D	D	-
Position	10	13	12	10	10	7	5	3	6	6	4	6	6	3	3	3	5	4	4	5	3	2	3	5	5	5	5	6	5	5	5	5

Source: Competitive matches
A = Away; H = Home; N = Neutral; W = Win; D = Draw; L = Loss; P = Postponed; = 1987–88 European Cup; = 1987–88 UEFA Cup

==== Matches ====
14 September 1986 1	Milan	0–1	Ascoli	Milan
		Report	Barbuti 19'	Stadium: San Siro

21 September 1986 2	Hellas Verona	1–0	Milan
	Galia 45'	Report

28 September 1986 3	Milan	2–1	Atalanta	Milan
	Di Bartolomei 18'; Massaro 28'	Report	Cantarutti 85'	Stadium: San Siro

5 October 1986 4	Juventus	0–0	Milan	Turin
		Report		Stadium: Comunale

12 October 1986 5	Milan	0–0	Internazionale	Milan
		Report		Stadium: San Siro

19 October 1986 6	Empoli	0–3	Milan
		Report	Massaro 26'; Baresi 61' (pen.); Virdis 90'

26 October 1986 7	Milan	2–0	Brescia	Milan
	Donadoni 14'; Virdis 40'	Report		Stadium: San Siro

2 November 1986 8	Milan	3–0	Fiorentina	Milan
	Baresi 41' (pen.); Virdis 74', 77'	Report		Stadium: San Siro

9 November 1986 9	Sampdoria	abd.	Milan	Genoa
	Vialli (penalty missed) 7'; Briegel 33'	Report	31' Virdis	Stadium: Luigi Ferraris; Referee: Pietro D'Elia
Note: Giovanni Galli blocked a penalty shoot-out by Vialli at 7'.Match suspended at 39’ due to referee issues.

20 November 1986 9	Sampdoria	3–0	Milan	Genoa
	Paganin 10'; Briegel 60'; Briegel 77'	Report		Stadium: Luigi Ferraris
Note: Match rescheduled from 9 November 1986.

23 November 1986 10	Milan	2–0	Avellino	Milan
	Virdis 53'; Hateley 70'	Report		Stadium: San Siro

30 November 1986 11	Torino	0–0	Milan	Turin
		Report		Stadium: Comunale

14 December 1986 12	Milan	0–0	Napoli	Milan
		Report		Stadium: San Siro

21 December 1986 13	Roma	1–2	Milan	Rome
	Desideri 45'	Report	Virdis 19', 54' (pen.)

4 January 1987 14	Como	0–1	Milan
		Report	Maldini 62'

11 January 1987 15	Milan	0–0	Udinese	Milan
		Report		Stadium: San Siro

18 January 1987 16	Ascoli	1–0	Milan	Ascoli Piceno
	Pusceddu 72'	Report		Stadium: Cino e Lillo Del Duca

1 February 1987 17	Milan	1–0	Hellas Verona	Milan
	Virdis 75'	Report		Stadium: San Siro

8 February 1987 18	Atalanta	1–2	Milan
	Magrin 69' (pen.)	Report	Virdis 31', 75'

22 February 1987 19	Milan	1–1	Juventus	Milan
	Virdis 74'	Report	Serena 55'	Stadium: San Siro

1 March 1987 20	Internazionale	1–2	Milan
	Baresi 26' (o.g.)	Report	Galderisi 53'; Virdis 85'

8 March 1987 21	Milan	1–0	Empoli	Milan
	Galderisi 5'	Report		Stadium: San Siro

15 March 1987 22	Brescia	1–0	Milan	Brescia
	Gritti 34'	Report		Stadium: Mario Rigamonti

22 March 1987 23	Fiorentina	2–2	Milan
	C. Pin 49'; Di Chiara 70'	Report	Galderisi 3'; Virdis 28' (pen.)

29 March 1987 24	Milan	0–2	Sampdoria	Milan
		Report	Vialli 36'; Cerezo 82'	Stadium: San Siro

5 April 1987 25	Avellino	2–1	Milan	Avellino
	Alessio 44'; Tovalieri 51'	Report	Tassotti 61'	Stadium: Partenio

12 April 1987 26	Milan	1–0	Torino	Milan
	Hateley 30'	Report		Stadium: San Siro

26 April 1987 27	Napoli	2–1	Milan	Naples
	Carnevale 33'; Maradona 43'	Report	Virdis 79'	Stadium: San Paolo

3 May 1987 28	Milan	4–1	Roma	Milan
	Virdis 26', 52', 54'; Donadoni 69'	Report	Boniek 10'	Stadium: San Siro

10 May 1987 29	Milan	0–0	Como	Milan
		Report		Stadium: San Siro

17 May 1987 30	Udinese	0–0	Milan	Udine
		Report		Stadium: Friuli

==== UEFA Cup qualification ====
23 May 1987	Milan	1–0	Sampdoria	Turin
	Massaro 102'			Stadium: Comunale; Attendance: 32 245; Referee: Lanese

==== Top scorers ====
- (Italy) Pietro Paolo Virdis 17
- (Italy) Giuseppe Galderisi 3
- (Italy) Franco Baresi 2
- (England) Mark Hateley 2
- (Italy) Roberto Donadoni 2
- (Italy) Daniele Massaro 2

=== Coppa Italia ===
First Round-Group 4

24 August 1986 1	Milan	1–0	Sambenedettese	Milan
	Di Bartolomei 32'			Stadium: Giuseppe Meazza; Attendance: 25 000; Referee: Sguizzato

27 August 1986 2	Triestina	0–1	Milan	Trieste
			85' Virdis	Stadium: Stadio Giuseppe Grezar; Attendance: 12 000; Referee: Bergamo (Livorno)

31 August 1986 3	Barletta	0–3	Milan	Barletta
			15', 40' Baresi; 62' Galderisi	Stadium: Stadio Comunale; Attendance: 12,550; Referee: Lanese (Messina)

3 September 1986 4	Milan	0–1	Parma	Milan
			9' Fontolan	Stadium: Stadio Giuseppe Meazza; Attendance: 37580; Referee: Luci (Florence)

7 September 1986 5	Ascoli	1–1	Milan	Ascoli Piceno
	Trifunović 8'		85' (pen.) Baresi	Stadium: Stadio Cino e Lillo Del Duca; Attendance: 20000; Referee: Redini

Eightfinals

25 February 1987	Milan	0–1	Parma	Milan
			82' Bortolazzi	Stadium: San Siro; Attendance: 15 643; Referee: Baldas

8 April 1987	Parma	0–0	Milan	Parma
				Stadium: Ennio Tardini; Attendance: 15 000; Referee: Lo Bello

== Statistics ==
=== Squad statistics ===
Competition	Points	Home						Away						Total						GD
Competition	Points	G	W	D	L	Gs	Ga	G	W	D	L	Gs	Ga	G	W	D	L	Gs	Ga	GD
1986-87 Serie A	35	15	8	5	2	17	6	15	5	4	6	14	15	31	14	9	8	32	21	+11
1986-87 Coppa Italia	–	3	1	0	2	1	2	4	2	2	0	5	1	7	3	2	2	6	3	+3
Total	–	18	9	5	4	18	8	19	7	6	6	19	16	38	17	11	10	38	24	+14

=== Players statistics ===
No.	Pos	Nat	Player	Total		1986-87 Serie A		1986-87 Coppa Italia	
No.	Pos	Nat	Player	Apps	Goals	Apps	Goals	Apps	Goals
	GK	(Italy) ITA	G. Galli	31	-18	25	-16	6	-2
	DF	(Italy) ITA	Tassotti	28	1	24	1	4	0
	DF	(Italy) ITA	Baresi	34	5	28	2	6	3
	DF	(Italy) ITA	Galli	27	0	19+2	0	6	0
	DF	(Italy) ITA	Bonetti	27	0	23	0	4	0
	DF	(Italy) ITA	Maldini	36	1	29	1	7	0
	MF	(Italy) ITA	Massaro	23	2	20+2	2	1	0
	MF	(Italy) ITA	Di Bartolomei	36	2	29+1	1	6	1
	MF	(Italy) ITA	Donadoni	35	2	28	2	7	0
	FW	(England) ENG	Hateley	28	2	18+5	2	5	0
	FW	(Italy) ITA	Virdis	34	18	26+2	17	6	1
	GK	(Italy) ITA	Nuciari	6	-6	5	-5	1	-1
	MF	(Italy) ITA	Manzo	23	0	15+5	0	3	0
	MF	(England) ENG	Wilkins	23	0	14+2	0	7	0
	FW	(Italy) ITA	Galderisi	28	4	13+8	3	7	1
	MF	(Italy) ITA	Evani	12	0	7	0	5	0
	DF	(Italy) ITA	Lorenzini	7	0	5	0	2	0
	DF	(Italy) ITA	Zanoncelli	10	0	2+4	0	4	0
	MF	(Italy) ITA	Stroppa	0	0	0	0	0	0

== Sources ==
- RSSSF – Italy 1986/87
