= 1995–96 AC Milan season =

AC Milan
1995–96 season
- Owner: Silvio Berlusconi
- President: Silvio Berlusconi
- Manager: Fabio Capello
- Stadium: San Siro
- Serie A: 1st (in 1996–97 UEFA Champions League)
- Coppa Italia: Quarter-finals
- UEFA Cup: Quarter-finals
- Top goalscorer: League: George Weah (11); All: George Weah (17)
- Average home league attendance: 60,973
Home colours	Away colours	Third colours

The 1995–96 season was Milan AC's 96th season in existence and the club's 13th consecutive season in the top flight of Italian football. Also the club played in Coppa Italia and UEFA Cup.

== Summary ==
AC Milan got back to the level at which it had performed in consecutive seasons between 1992 and 1994, resulting in the domestic league title. It had reacted to its unexpected fall from grace in the 1994-95 season by signing George Weah and Roberto Baggio for the attack. Despite Baggio not performing at his customary Juventus level, a tight defence landed the title for the Milanese club.

Following the end of the season, Fabio Capello left the club to join Spanish La Liga giants Real Madrid as a new manager.

== Squad ==
Note: Flags indicate national team as defined under FIFA eligibility rules; some limited exceptions apply. Players may hold more than one non-FIFA nationality.

No.	Pos.	Nation	Player
1	GK	ITA	Sebastiano Rossi
2	DF	ITA	Christian Panucci
3	DF	ITA	Paolo Maldini
4	MF	ITA	Demetrio Albertini
5	DF	ITA	Filippo Galli
6	DF	ITA	Franco Baresi
7	FW	ITA	Paolo Di Canio
8	MF	FRA	Marcel Desailly
9	FW	LBR	George Weah
10	MF	YUG	Dejan Savićević
11	MF	ITA	Roberto Donadoni
12	GK	ITA	Mario Ielpo
13	DF	ITA	Francesco Coco

No.	Pos.	Nation	Player
14	FW	ITA	Gianluigi Lentini
15	MF	ITA	Massimo Ambrosini
16	MF	ITA	Tomas Locatelli
18	FW	ITA	Roberto Baggio
20	MF	CRO	Zvonimir Boban
21	DF	ITA	Mauro Tassotti
23	FW	ITA	Marco Simone
24	FW	ITA	Stefano Eranio
26	MF	ITA	Gianluca Sordo
28	FW	POR	Paulo Futre
29	DF	ITA	Alessandro Costacurta
31	MF	FRA	Patrick Vieira

=== Transfers ===
In
Pos.	Name	from	Type
FW	Roberto Baggio	Juventus	€9.30 million
FW	George Weah	Paris Saint-Germain	€6.90 million
MF	Patrick Vieira	Cannes	
MF	Paulo Futre	A.C. Reggiana	€0.75 million
DF	Enzo Gambaro	A.C. Reggiana	
MF	Tomas Locatelli	Atalanta B.C.	
MF	Massimo Ambrosini	A.C. Cesena	
DF	Francesco Coco	Youth Squad	
DF	Roberto Lorenzini	Torino	
MF	Angelo Carbone	Fiorentina	loan ended
FW	Francesco Cozza	Vicenza Calcio	

Out
Pos.	Name	To	Type
FW	Daniele Massaro	Shimizu S-Pulse	
FW	Marco van Basten		retired
GK	Carlo Cudicini	Prato	-
DF	Enzo Gambaro	Bolton Wanderers	
DF	Roberto Lorenzini	Piacenza Calcio	loan
MF	Angelo Carbone	Piacenza Calcio	-
FW	Francesco Cozza	Lucchese	loan
MF	Massimo Orlando	Fiorentina	-
MF	Giovanni Stroppa	Udinese Calcio	-
MF	Francesco De Francesco	Prato	loan
FW	Alessandro Melli	Sampdoria	loan ended

==== Winter ====
In
Pos.	Name	from	Type

Out
Pos.	Name	To	Type
DF	Stefano Nava	Calcio Padova	

==== Spring ====
In
Pos.	Name	from	Type

Out
Pos.	Name	To	Type
MF	Roberto Donadoni	NY Metrostars	

== Competitions ==
=== Serie A ===
==== League table ====
Pos	Team	Pld	W	D	L	GF	GA	GD	Pts	Qualification or relegation
1	Milan (C)	34	21	10	3	60	24	+36	73	Qualified to Champions League
2	Juventus	34	19	8	7	58	35	+23	65 (Note: Juventus qualified to 1996–97 UEFA Champions League as title holders.)	Qualified to Champions League
3	Lazio	34	17	8	9	66	38	+28	59	Qualification to UEFA Cup
4	Fiorentina	34	17	8	9	53	41	+12	59	Qualification to Cup Winners' Cup
5	Roma	34	16	10	8	51	34	+17	58 (Note: ROM 1-1 PAR; PAR 1-1 ROM Roma is ahead due to Goal difference.)	Qualification to UEFA Cup

Source: 1995–96 Serie A, RSSSF.com, Soccerway
Rules for classification: 1) Points; 2) Head-to-head points; 3) Head-to-head goal difference; 4) Goal difference; 5) Goals scored; 6) Draw. (Note: Head-to-head record is used only after all the matches between the teams in question have been played).
(C) Champions

==== Results summary ====
Overall								Home						Away					
Pld	W	D	L	GF	GA	GD	Pts	W	D	L	GF	GA	GD	W	D	L	GF	GA	GD
34	21	10	3	60	24	+36	73	13	3	1	41	11	+30	8	7	2	19	13	+6

Source: Competitive matches

==== Results by round ====
Round	1	2	3	4	5	6	7	8	9	10	11	12	13	14	15	16	17	18	19	20	21	22	23	24	25	26	27	28	29	30	31	32	33	34
Ground	A	H	A	H	A	H	A	A	H	A	H	A	H	H	A	H	A	H	A	H	A	H	A	H	H	H	A	H	A	A	A	H	A	H
Result	W	W	W	W	L	W	D	D	W	D	W	W	D	D	D	W	D	W	W	W	W	W	D	W	L	W	W	D	W	W	D	W	L	W
Position	4	3	2	1	1	1	1	1	1	1	1	1	1	1	1	1	1	1	1	1	1	1	1	1	1	1	1	1	1	1	1	1	1	1

Source: Competitive matches
A = Away; H = Home; W = Win; D = Draw; L = Loss; = 1996–97 UEFA Champions League; = 1996–97 UEFA Cup

==== Matches ====
27 August 1995 1	Padova	1–2	Milan	Padua
	N. Amoruso 34'	Report	Weah 7'; Baresi 44'	Stadium: Euganeo; Attendance: 25,807; Referee: Ceccarini

10 September 1995 2	Milan	2–1	Udinese	Milan
	Sergio 10' (o.g.); R. Baggio 85'	Report	Poggi 59'	Stadium: San Siro; Attendance: 57,554; Referee: Bazzoli

17 September 1995 3	Roma	1–2	Milan	Rome
	Balbo 15'	Report	Weah 45', 76'	Stadium: Olimpico; Attendance: 59,353; Referee: Collina

24 September 1995 4	Milan	3–0	Atalanta	Milan
	Desailly 25'; R. Baggio 88'; Di Canio 90'	Report		Stadium: San Siro; Attendance: 60,655; Referee: Bettin

1 October 1995 5	Bari	1–0	Milan	Bari
	Gautieri 46'	Report		Stadium: San Nicola; Attendance: 53,866; Referee: Stafoggia

15 October 1995 6	Milan	2–1	Juventus	Milan
	Simone 7'; Weah 14'	Report	Del Piero 81'	Stadium: San Siro; Attendance: 82,798; Referee: Boggi

22 October 1995 7	Vicenza	1–1	Milan	Vicenza
	Murgita 49'	Report	Eranio 43'	Stadium: Romeo Menti; Attendance: 19,924; Referee: Cesari

29 October 1995 8	Inter Milan	1–1	Milan	Milan
	M. Paganin 19'	Report	Savićević 46'	Stadium: Giuseppe Meazza; Attendance: 70,196; Referee: Braschi

5 November 1995 9	Milan	3–2	Cagliari	Milan
	Di Canio 10'; Lentini 16'; Simone 48'	Report	Oliveira 34', 67' (pen.)	Stadium: San Siro; Attendance: 49,614; Referee: Farina

19 November 1995 10	Parma	0–0	Milan	Parma
		Report		Stadium: Il Tardini; Attendance: 28,465; Referee: Boggi

26 November 1995 11	Milan	3–0	Piacenza	Milan
	Savićević 7'; Panucci 25'; Maldini 77'	Report		Stadium: San Siro; Attendance: 53,710; Referee: Pairetto

3 December 1995 12	Lazio	0–1	Milan	Rome
		Report	Weah 87'	Stadium: Olimpico; Attendance: 61,800; Referee: Treossi

10 December 1995 13	Milan	0–0	Napoli	Milan
		Report		Stadium: San Siro; Attendance: 52,838; Referee: Pellegrino

17 December 1995 14	Milan	1–1	Torino	Milan
	Boban 12'	Report	Rizzitelli 6' (pen.)	Stadium: San Siro; Attendance: 51,600; Referee: Tombolini

23 December 1995 15	Fiorentina	2–2	Milan	Florence
	Robbiati 13'; Baiano 74'	Report	Weah 12'; R. Baggio 54' (pen.)	Stadium: Stadio Artemio Franchi; Attendance: 42,338; Referee: Pairetto

7 January 1996 16	Milan	3–0	Sampdoria	Milan
	Panucci 10'; Savićević 37'; R. Baggio 56'	Report		Stadium: San Siro; Attendance: 54,850; Referee: Rodomonti

14 January 1996 17	Cremonese	0–0	Milan	Cremona
		Report		Stadium: Giovanni Zini; Attendance: 13,932; Referee: Beschin

21 January 1996 18	Milan	1–0	Padova	Milan
	R. Baggio 56' (pen.)	Report		Stadium: San Siro; Attendance: 51,521; Referee: Quartuccio

28 January 1996 19	Udinese	0–2	Milan	Udine
		Report	Maldini 44'; Boban 60'	Stadium: Friuli; Attendance: 30,184; Referee: Trentalange

4 February 1996 20	Milan	3–1	Roma	Milan
	Weah 7'; Aldair 55' (o.g.); Panucci 86'	Report	Moriero 8'	Stadium: San Siro; Attendance: 60,965; Referee: Bazzoli

11 February 1996 21	Atalanta	0–1	Milan	Bergamo
		Report	Weah 2'	Stadium: Atleti Azzurri d'Italia; Attendance: 25,298; Referee: Farina

18 February 1996 22	Milan	3–2	Bari	Milan
	Simone 7', 28' (pen.); Weah 88'	Report	Pedone 21'; Sala 49'	Stadium: San Siro; Attendance: 54,601; Referee: Bettin

25 February 1996 23	Juventus	1–1	Milan	Turin
	Conte 3'	Report	Weah 30'	Stadium: Delle Alpi; Attendance: 51,343; Referee: Boggi

2 March 1996 24	Milan	4–0	Vicenza	Milan
	Savićević 47'; Simone 51', 59' (pen.); Di Canio 88'	Report		Stadium: San Siro; Attendance: 69,244; Referee: Stafoggia

10 March 1996 25	Milan	0–1	Inter Milan	Milan
		Report	Branca 5'	Stadium: San Siro; Attendance: 77,461; Referee: Trentalange

17 March 1996 26	Cagliari	suspensed	Milan	Cagliari
		Report		Stadium: Sant'Elia
Note: Match suspended due to a players' strike.

24 March 1996 27	Milan	3–0	Parma	Milan
	R. Baggio (penalty missed) 10', 43'; Donadoni 48'; Savićević 72'	Report		Stadium: San Siro; Attendance: 65,184; Referee: Collina
Note: Lucca Bucci blocked a penalty kick by Baggio at 10'.

31 March 1996 28	Piacenza	0–2	Milan	Piacenza
		Report	Desailly 51'; Simone 66'	Stadium: Galleana; Attendance: 18,174; Referee: Braschi

6 April 1996 29	Milan	0–0	Lazio	Milan
		Report		Stadium: San Siro; Attendance: 60,528; Referee: Rodomonti

10 April 1996 26	Cagliari	1–2	Milan	Cagliari
	Villa 32'	Report	Napoli 30' (o.g.); Oliveira 78' (o.g.)	Stadium: Sant'Elia; Attendance: 30,949; Referee: Treossi
Note: Match rescheduled from 16 March 1996 due to a players' strike.

14 April 1996 30	Napoli	0–1	Milan	Naples
		Report	Panucci 13'	Stadium: Stadio San Paolo; Attendance: 46,192; Referee: Ceccarini

20 April 1996 31	Torino	1–1	Milan	Turin
	Cristallini 79' (pen.)	Report	Maldini 62'	Stadium: Delle Alpi; Attendance: 23,035; Referee: Borriello

28 April 1996 32	Milan	3–1	Fiorentina	Milan
	Savićević 14'; R. Baggio 45' (pen.); Simone 76'	Report	Rui Costa 13', (penalty missed) 62'	Stadium: San Siro; Attendance: 79,415; Referee: Cinciripini
Note: Sebastiano Rossi blocked a penalty kick by Rui Costa at 62'.

5 May 1996 33	Sampdoria	3–0	Milan	Genoa
	Chiesa 1', 35'; R. Mancini 38'	Report		Stadium: Stadio Luigi Ferraris; Attendance: 28,320; Referee: Bazzoli

12 May 1996 34	Milan	7–1	Cremonese	Milan
	De Agostini 7', 61' (o.g.); Weah 59'; Panucci 65'; Di Canio 83', 85'; Boban 84'	Report	Florjančič 22'	Stadium: San Siro; Attendance: 61,731; Referee: Lana

=== Coppa Italia ===
==== Round of 32 ====
30 August 1995	Pescara	1–4	Milan	Pescara
	Giampaolo 90'	Report	Lentini 37'; Savićević 42'; Weah 51'; Simone 69'	Stadium: Adriatico; Attendance: 25,000; Referee: Stafoggia

==== Eightfinals ====
25 October 1995	Forlì	0–2	Milan	Cesena
		Report	Di Canio 38'; Eranio 54'	Stadium: Dino Manuzzi; Attendance: 21,170; Referee: Emilio Pellegrino

==== Quarterfinals ====
28 November 1995 1	Bologna	1–1	Milan	Bologna
	Morello 52'	Report	Coco 23'	Stadium: Renato Dall'Ara; Attendance: 29,508; Referee: Piero Ceccarini

13 December 1995 2	Milan	1–1 (a.e.t.) (2–2 agg.) (6–7 p)	Bologna	Milan
	Savićević 90' (pen.)	Report	Baresi 77' (o.g.)	Stadium: San Siro; Attendance: 5,462; Referee: Livio Bazzoli
	Penalties
	Eranio (penalty missed); Albertini (penalty scored); Maldini (penalty scored); Boban (penalty scored); Di Canio (penalty scored); Weah (penalty scored); Lentini (penalty scored); Coco (penalty missed)		(penalty missed) Bosi; (penalty scored) Scapolo; (penalty scored) Paramatti; (penalty scored) Pergolizzi; (penalty scored) Bresciani; (penalty scored) Valtolina; (penalty scored) Morello; (penalty scored) Torrisi

=== UEFA Cup ===
==== First round ====
12 September 1995 1	Milan (Italy)	4–0	(Poland) Zagłębie Lubin	Milan
	Savićević 11'; Machaj 47' (o.g.); Weah 67'; Boban 71'	Report		Stadium: San Siro; Referee: (Sweden) Christer Fällström

26 September 1995 2	Zagłębie Lubin (Poland)	1–4 (1–8 agg.)	(Italy) Milan	Lubin
	Krzyżanowski 73'	Report	Eranio 53'; Simone 63'; Boban 86', 90'	Stadium: Stadion Zagłębia Lubin; Attendance: 17,000; Referee: (Turkey) Sarvan

==== Second round ====
17 October 1995 1	Strasbourg (France)	0–1	(Italy) Milan	Strasbourg
		Report	Simone 79'	Stadium: Stade de la Meinau; Attendance: 25,765; Referee: (Scotland) McCluskey

2 November 1995 2	Milan (Italy)	2–1 (3–1 agg.)	(France) Strasbourg	Milan
	Baggio 28', 44' (pen.)	Report	Sauzée 45'	Stadium: San Siro; Attendance: 13,652; Referee: (Greece) Nikakis

==== Eightfinals ====
23 November 1995 1	Milan (Italy)	2–0	(Czech Republic) Sparta Prague	Milan
	Weah 33', 76'	Report		Stadium: San Siro; Attendance: 12,758; Referee: (Belgium) Frans van den Wijngaert

7 December 1995 2	Sparta Prague (Czech Republic)	0–0 (0–2 agg.)	(Italy) Milan	Prague
		Report		Stadium: Stadion Letná; Attendance: 17,200; Referee: (Spain) López

==== Quarterfinals ====
5 March 1996 1	Milan (Italy)	2–0	(France) Girondins Bordeaux	Milan
	Eranio 29'; Baggio 74'	Report		Stadium: San Siro; Attendance: 22,740; Referee: (Belarus) Vadzim Žuk

19 March 1996 2	Girondins Bordeaux (France)	3–0 (3–2 agg.)	(Italy) Milan	Bordeaux
	Tholot 14'; Dugarry 64'; Dugarry 70'; Dugarry (yellow card) 89'	Report	Eranio '25; Maldini (yellow card) 29'; Costacurta (yellow card) 44'; Di Canio (yellow card) 72'	Stadium: Stade du Parc Lescure; Attendance: 35,000; Referee: (Turkey) Ahmet Çakar

== Statistics ==
=== Players statistics ===
No.	Pos	Nat	Player	Total		Serie A		UEFA Cup		Coppa Italia	
No.	Pos	Nat	Player	Apps	Goals	Apps	Goals	Apps	Goals	Apps	Goals
1	GK	(Italy) ITA	Rossi	34	-24	34	-24	0	0	0	0
2	DF	(Italy) ITA	Panucci	38	5	29	5	7	0	2	0
29	DF	(Italy) ITA	Costacurta	41	0	30	0	8	0	3	0
6	DF	(Italy) ITA	Baresi	40	1	30	1	7	0	3	0
3	DF	(Italy) ITA	Maldini	41	3	30	3	8	0	3	0
24	MF	(Italy) ITA	Eranio	33	4	17+7	1	6+1	2	2	1
8	MF	(France) FRA	Desailly	40	2	32	2	7	0	1	0
4	MF	(Italy) ITA	Albertini	38	0	29+1	0	4+1	0	3	0
10	MF	(Federal Republic of Yugoslavia) YUG	Savićević	29	9	23	6	3	1	3	2
9	FW	(Liberia) LBR	Weah	35	15	26	11	6	3	3	1
18	FW	(Italy) ITA	Baggio	34	10	26+2	7	3+2	3	1	0
12	GK	(Italy) ITA	Ielpo	12	-8	0	0	8	-5	4	-3
23	FW	(Italy) ITA	Simone	35	11	16+11	8	5	2	3	1
11	MF	(Italy) ITA	Donadoni	29	1	14+9	1	4+2	0	0	0
20	MF	(Croatia) CRO	Boban	20	6	13	3	5	3	2	0
21	DF	(Italy) ITA	Tassotti	20	0	7+8	0	1+2	0	2	0
14	MF	(Italy) ITA	Lentini	14	2	5+4	1	0+1	0	4	1
7	FW	(Italy) ITA	Di Canio	34	6	4+18	5	2+6	0	4	1
5	DF	(Italy) ITA	Galli	8	0	3+3	0	2	0	0	0
13	DF	(Italy) ITA	Coco	10	1	3+2	0	0+1	0	4	1
15	MF	(Italy) ITA	Ambrosini	14	0	1+6	0	1+2	0	4	0
31	MF	(France) FRA	Vieira	5	0	1+1	0	2	0	1	0
28	MF	(Portugal) POR	Futre	1	0	1	0	0	0	0	0
26	MF	(Italy) ITA	Sordo	5	0	0+5	0	0	0	0	0
16	MF	(Italy) ITA	Locatelli	9	0	0+5	0	0+2	0	2	0
17	GK	(Italy) ITA	Aldegani	0	0	0	0	0	0	0	0

- Source: https://www.bdfutbol.com/en/t/t1995-963015.html

== Sources ==
- RSSSF - Italy 1995/96
