= Stefano Nava =

Italian footballer

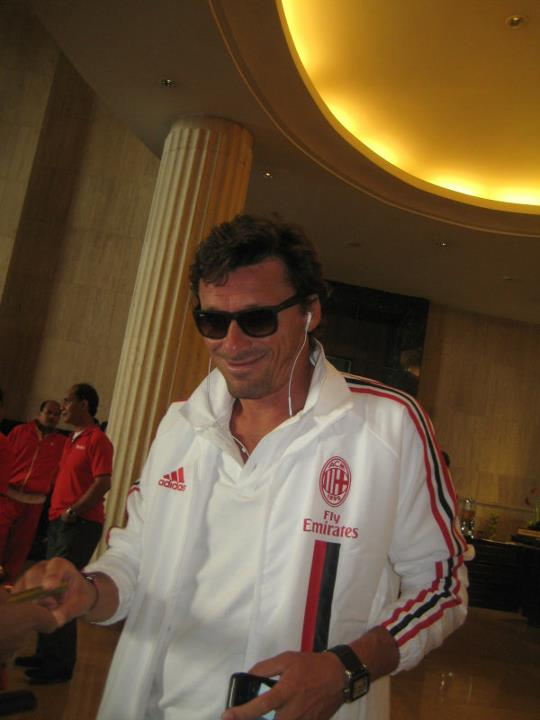
- Nava in 2011

Personal information
- Date of birth: 19 February 1969 (age 57)
- Place of birth: Milan, Italy
- Height: 1.85 m (6 ft 1 in)
- Position: Defender

Youth career
- AC Milan

Senior career*
Years	Team	Apps	(Gls)
1988–1989	Virescit Boccaleone	30	(2)
1989–1990	Reggiana	32	(0)
1990–1991	AC Milan	2	(0)
1991–1992	→ Parma (loan)	19	(0)
1992–1995	AC Milan	19	(1)
1995–1996	Padova	17	(0)
1996–1997	Servette	10	(1)
1998–1999	Sampdoria	14	(0)
2000–2001	Pro Sesto	12	(0)
Total		155	(4)

Managerial career
- 2004: Pro Sesto
- 2016–2017: AC Milan Youth
- * Club domestic league appearances and goals

Stefano Nava (born 19 February 1969) is an Italian football manager and former footballer, who played as a defender. He is best known for having played for AC Milan in the early 1990s, where he was a backup for players such as Franco Baresi, Paolo Maldini, Mauro Tassotti, and Alessandro Costacurta.

== Career ==
Nava began his career in 1985 with Pro Sesto, before joining the AC Milan youth squad. In 1988, he made his professional debut in Serie C1 with Virescit Boccaleone, and during the next season, he moved to Serie B side Reggiana.

He returned to AC Milan in 1990, where he was a reserve in the first team's defence, behind the legendary Maldini, Baresi, Costacurta, Tassotti back-line, which is regarded by many as the sport as one of the greatest defensive line-ups of all time. (Note: See) He made his Milan debut on 5 September 1990, in a 1–0 home Coppa Italia victory over Triestina, as Milan went on to reach the final of the tournament. He made his Serie A debut with the club on 3 March 1991, in a 4–1 home win over Napoli. In his four non-consecutive seasons with Milan (1990–91 under Arrigo Sacchi, and 1992–995 under Fabio Capello), Nava made a total of 47 appearances in all competitions, and 21 Serie A league appearances, scoring 1 goal, which came in Serie A. During his time at the club he won two Serie A titles, three Supercoppa Italiana titles, two UEFA Super Cups, an UEFA Champions League, and an Intercontinental Cup. He spent the 1991–92 season only loan with Parma, with whom they won the Coppa Italia. His final appearance with Milan was in a 5–0 away victory against Brescia, during the 1994–95 Serie A season, on 5 March 1995.

Nava took part in the AC Milan's 4–0 win over FC Barcelona in the 1993–94 Champions League final on 18 May 1994, alongside usual substitutes Christian Panucci and Filippo Galli, entering as substitute in the 84th minute of the match replacing Paolo Maldini.

After his time with Milan, Nava spent a season on loan at Padova, and another with Servette in the Swiss Super League, the club to which he later moved on a free transfer. He subsequently spend two seasons with Sampdoria before ending his career with Pro Sesto in Serie C2, at the conclusion of the 2000–01 season.

== After retirement ==
Nava had a one-month spell as Pro Sesto head coach in January 2004, the team with which he began his career, and eventually retired. He later became the coach of Masseroni Marchese, helping with the Milan Youth Programme. During the 2011–12 season, he became the coach of the Milan Giovanissimi Nazionali Youth squad, and the following season, he worked alongside Filippo Inzaghi, who was the coach of the Milan Allievi Nazionali Youth Side. During the 2014–15 season, he was appointed the coach of the Milan Berretti Youth Side.

He currently works as a football commentator and pundit for SKY Italia. In 2014, he was named as the new analyst for the Italian edition of EA Sports' FIFA 15, alongside match commentator Pierluigi Pardo, replacing Giuseppe Bergomi.

== Personal life ==
Nava's son Lapo (born in 2004) followed on his father's footsteps, and is currently a youth goalkeeper for Milan.

== Honours ==
Milan

- Serie A: 1992–93, 1993–94
- Supercoppa Italiana: 1992, 1993, 1994
- UEFA Champions League: 1993–94
- UEFA Super Cup: 1990, 1994
- Intercontinental Cup: 1990

Parma

- Coppa Italia: 1991–92
