= 1979–80 SS Lazio season =

Lazio
1979–80 season
- Manager: Luigi Simoni
- Serie A: 13th
- Coppa Italia: Quarter Final
- Top goalscorer: Bruno Giordano (9)
Home colours

SS Lazio finished three points above the relegation zone, but were relegated due to involvement in a match-fixing scandal, that also saw Milan being demoted to Serie B.

== Squad ==
=== Goalkeepers ===
- (Italy) Giuseppe Avagliano
- (Italy) Massimo Cacciatori

=== Defenders ===
- (Italy) Filippo Citterio
- (Italy) Lionello Manfredonia
- (Italy) Luigi Martini
- (Italy) Dario Pighin
- (Italy) Mauro Tassotti
- (Italy) Giuseppe Wilson

=== Midfielders ===
- (Italy) Riccardo Cenci
- (Italy) Vincenzo D'Amico
- (Italy) Stefano Ferretti
- (Argentina) Antonio Labonia
- (Italy) Antonio Lopez
- (Italy) Mauro Manzoni
- (Italy) Maurizio Montesi
- (Italy) Salvatore Pesce
- (Italy) Fernando Viola
- (Italy) Vincenzo Zucchini

=== Attackers ===
- (Italy) Salvatore Campilongo
- (Italy) Renzo Garlaschelli
- (Italy) Bruno Giordano
- (Italy) Enrico Todesco

== Competitions ==
=== Serie A ===
==== League table ====
| Pos | Team | Pld | W | D | L | GF | GA | GD | Pts | Qualification or relegation |
|---|---|---|---|---|---|---|---|---|---|---|
| 12 | Catanzaro | 30 | 5 | 14 | 11 | 20 | 34 | −14 | 24 | |
| 13 | Udinese | 30 | 3 | 15 | 12 | 24 | 38 | −14 | 21 | |
| 14 | Pescara (R) | 30 | 4 | 8 | 18 | 18 | 44 | −26 | 16 | Relegation to Serie B |
| 15 | Milan (Note: A.C. Milan and S.S. Lazio placed in the last position and relegated to Serie B by FIGC because of the Totonero 1980 scandal. Torino qualified to UEFA Cup instead of Milan.) (D, R) | 30 | 14 | 8 | 8 | 34 | 19 | +15 | 36 | Relegation to Serie B |
| 16 | Lazio (D, R) | 30 | 5 | 15 | 10 | 21 | 25 | −4 | 25 | Relegation to Serie B |

Source: RSSSF.com
Rules for classification: 1) Points; 2) Head-to-head points; 3) Head-to-head goal difference; 4) Goal difference; 5) Goals scored; 6) Draw. (Note: Head-to-head record is used only after all the matches between the teams in question have been played).
Goal difference is used in case of equal points.
(D) Disqualified; (R) Relegated

==== Matches ====
| 16 September 1979 1 | Avellino | 0–0 | Lazio | Avellino |

| 23 September 1979 2 | Lazio | 2–0 | Fiorentina | Rome |
| | Giordano 12'; Garlaschelli 90' | | | Stadium: Olimpico |

| 30 September 1979 3 | Internazionale | 2–1 | Lazio | Milan |
| | Beccalossi 17'; Marini 71' | | Giordano 42' | Stadium: Giuseppe Meazza |

| 7 October 1979 4 | Lazio | 1–1 | Perugia | Rome |
| | Giordano 61' | | Rossi 41' | Stadium: Olimpico |

| 14 October 1979 5 | Ascoli | 1–1 | Lazio | Ascoli Piceno |
| | Bellotto 9' | | Giordano 57' | Stadium: Cino e Lillo Del Duca |

| 21 October 1979 6 | Lazio | 1–1 | Cagliari | Rome |
| | Giordano 30' | | Marchetti 48' | Stadium: Olimpico |

| 28 October 1979 7 | Roma | 1–1 | Lazio | Rome |
| | Pruzzo 16' | | Zucchini 6' | Stadium: Olimpico |

| 4 November 1979 8 | Lazio | 1–0 | Juventus | Rome |
| | Verza 11' (o.g.) | | | Stadium: Olimpico |

| 11 October 1979 9 | Lazio | 2–0 | Pescara | Rome |
| | Giordano 11'; D'Amico 82' | | | Stadium: Olimpico |

| 25 November 1979 10 | Catanzaro | 2–1 | Lazio | Catanzaro |
| | Palanca 25'; Palanca 77' | | Zucchini 84' |

| 2 December 1979 11 | Bologna | 1–0 | Lazio | Bologna |
| | Chiarugi 74' | | | Stadium: Renato Dall'Ara |

| 9 December 1979 12 | Lazio | 0–0 | Udinese | Rome |
| | | | | Stadium: Olimpico |

| 16 December 1979 13 | Napoli | 0–0 | Lazio | Naples |
| | | | | Stadium: San Paolo |

| 30 December 1979 14 | Lazio | 2–1 | Torino | Rome |
| | D'Amico 50'; Citterio 68' | | Mariani 1' | Stadium: Olimpico |

| 6 January 1980 15 | Milan | 2–1 | Lazio | Milan |
| | Chiodi 4'; Chiodi 39' | | Giordano 90' | Stadium: San Siro |

| 13 January 1980 16 | Lazio | 1–1 | Avellino | Rome |
| | | | | Stadium: Olimpico |

| 20 January 1980 17 | Fiorentina | 0–0 | Lazio | Florence |
| | | | | Stadium: Comunale |

| 27 January 1980 18 | Lazio | 0–0 | Internazionale | Rome |
| | | | | Stadium: Olimpico |

| 3 February 1980 19 | Perugia | 0–0 | Lazio | Perugia |

| 10 February 1980 20 | Lazio | 0–1 | Ascoli | Rome |
| | | | | Stadium: Olimpico |

| 24 February 1980 21 | Cagliari | 1–1 | Lazio | Cagliari |
| | | | | Stadium: Sant'Elia |

| 2 March 1980 22 | Lazio | 1–2 | Roma | Rome |
| | | | | Stadium: Olimpico |

| 9 March 1980 23 | Juventus | 0–0 | Lazio | Turin |
| | | | | Stadium: Comunale |

| 23 March 1980 24 | Pescara | 2–0 | Lazio | Pescara |

| 30 March 1980 25 | Lazio | 2–0 | Catanzaro | Rome |
| | | | | Stadium: Olimpico |

| 5 April 1980 26 | Lazio | 0–1 | Bologna | Rome |
| | | | | Stadium: Olimpico |

| 13 April 1980 27 | Udinese | 1–1 | Lazio | Udine |
| | | | | Stadium: Friuli |

| 27 April 1980 28 | Lazio | 1–1 | Napoli | Rome |
| | | | | Stadium: Olimpico |

| 4 May 1980 29 | Torino | 1–0 | Lazio | Turin |
| | | | | Stadium: Comunale |

| 11 May 1980 30 | Lazio | 0–2 | Milan | Rome |
| | | | | Stadium: Olimpico |

=== Coppa Italia ===
Group stage

| Pos | Team | Pld | W | D | L | GF | GA | GD | Pts |
|---|---|---|---|---|---|---|---|---|---|
| 1 | Lazio | 4 | 3 | 1 | 0 | 9 | 1 | +8 | 7 |
| 2 | Udinese | 4 | 3 | 1 | 0 | 5 | 0 | +5 | 7 |
| 3 | Brescia | 4 | 1 | 1 | 2 | 1 | 3 | −2 | 3 |
| 4 | Pistoiese | 4 | 1 | 0 | 3 | 3 | 5 | −2 | 2 |
| 5 | Matera | 4 | 0 | 1 | 3 | 0 | 9 | −9 | 1 |

| 1 | Lazio | 5–0 | Matera |

| 2 | Brescia | 0–2 | Lazio |

| 3 | Pistoiese | 1–2 | Lazio |

| 5 | Lazio | 0–0 | Udinese |

Quarterfinals

| Torino | 0–0 | Lazio | Turin |
| | | | Stadium: Comunale |

| Lazio | 0–0 (3–4 p) | Torino |
