= 1994 Supercoppa Italiana =

- Event: Supercoppa Italiana
AC Milan	Sampdoria
Serie A	Coppa Italia
1	1
- After extra time Milan won 4–3 on penalties
- Date: 28 August 1994
- Venue: San Siro, Milan, Italy
- Referee: Pierluigi Pairetto
- Attendance: 26,767

The 1994 Supercoppa Italiana was a match played by the 1993–94 Serie A winners AC Milan and 1993–94 Coppa Italia winners Sampdoria. It took place on 28 August 1994 at the San Siro in Milan, Italy. AC Milan won the match 4–3 on penalties to earn their fourth Supercoppa.

== Match details ==
28 August 1994

AC Milan	1–1	Sampdoria
Gullit 83'	Report	Mihajlović 35'
Penalties
Albertini (penalty scored); Boban (penalty scored); Simone (penalty scored); Costacurta (penalty scored)	4 – 3	(penalty scored) Platt; (penalty scored) Vierchowod; (penalty scored) Jugović; (penalty missed) Evani; (penalty missed) Mihajlović

San Siro, Milan, Italy
Attendance: 26,767
Referee: Pierluigi Pairetto

AC Milan	Sampdoria

MILAN:
GK	1	(Italy) Sebastiano Rossi
RB	2	(Italy) Mauro Tassotti	(substituted off) 84'
CB	5	(Italy) Alessandro Costacurta
CB	6	(Italy) Franco Baresi (c)
LB	3	(Italy) Alessandro Orlando
RM	10	(Italy) Roberto Donadoni
CM	8	(Italy) Demetrio Albertini
CM	9	(Croatia) Zvonimir Boban
LM	7	(Italy) Gianluigi Lentini	(substituted off) 46'
RF	4	(Netherlands) Ruud Gullit
LF	11	(Italy) Marco Simone
Substitutes:
GK	12	(Italy) Mario Ielpo
DF	13	(Italy) Stefano Nava	(substituted in) 46'
DF	14	(Italy) Filippo Galli
DF	15	(Italy) Roberto Lorenzini	(substituted in) 84'
CF	16	(Italy) Francesco De Francesco
Manager:
(Italy) Fabio Capello

Sampdoria:
GK	1	(Italy) Walter Zenga
RB	2	(Italy) Michele Serena	(substituted off) 84'
CB	5	(Italy) Pietro Vierchowod
CB	6	(Federal Republic of Yugoslavia) Siniša Mihajlović
LB	3	(Italy) Riccardo Ferri
RM	7	(Italy) Attilio Lombardo
CM	4	(England) David Platt
CM	11	(Italy) Alberigo Evani
LM	8	(Federal Republic of Yugoslavia) Vladimir Jugović
SS	10	(Italy) Roberto Mancini (c)
CF	9	(Italy) Alessandro Melli	(substituted off) 72'
Substitutes:
GK	12	(Italy) Giulio Nuciari
DF	13	(Italy) Stefano Sacchetti	(substituted in) 84'
MF	14	(Italy) Riccardo Maspero
MF	15	(Italy) Fausto Salsano
FW	16	(Italy) Mauro Bertarelli	(substituted in) 72'
Manager:
(Sweden) Sven-Göran Eriksson

MATCH OFFICIALS

- Assistant referees:
- Fourth official:

MATCH RULES

- 90 minutes.
- 30 minutes of extra-time if necessary.
- Penalty shoot-out if scores still level.
- Five named substitutes
- Maximum of 2 substitutions.

== See also ==
- 1988 Supercoppa Italiana - played between same teams
- 1994–95 AC Milan season
- 1994–95 UC Sampdoria season
