= Marco Macina =

Sammarinese footballer

Personal information
- Date of birth: September 30, 1964 (age 62)
- Place of birth: San Marino, San Marino
- Height: 1.76 m (5 ft 9 1/2 in)
- Position: Attacking midfielder

Youth career
- Tre Penne
- Bologna

Senior career*
Years	Team	Apps	(Gls)
1981–1983	Bologna	24	(3)
1983–1984	Arezzo	11	(1)
1984–1985	Parma	26	(3)
1985–1986	AC Milan	5	(0)
1986–1987	Reggiana	23	(4)
1987–1988	Ancona	5	(0)

International career
1980–1982	Italy U-16		
1990	San Marino	2	(0)
- * Club domestic league appearances and goals

Marco Macina (born 30 September 1964) is a Sammarinese former footballer.

One of only two Sanmarinese players to appear in the Italian Serie A (the other being Massimo Bonini), playing alongside Roberto Mancini with Bologna, Macina was not able to fully show his potential, despite having been signed by AC Milan in 1985. He left professional football in 1988, after a Serie C season with Ancona. Macina also played two European Cup qualifying matches for San Marino in 1990.

== Career ==
=== Club ===
He had to leave professional football at age 25 from complications due to the rupture of a ligament in his right knee.

During his career, he had a total of 13 appearances in Serie A and 51 appearances in Serie B. He scored 6 goals in Serie B.

=== National ===
He played for the Italian's Under-16 National Team (before 1988, the year of the San Marino National Team affiliation to FIFA and UEFA, the Sammarinese footballers were in fact assimilated Italians), winning the European Football Championship U-16 in 1982.

== Achievements ==
=== Club ===
==== Campionato Italiano Serie C1: 1 ====
Ancona: 1987-1988 (group A)

=== National ===
==== European Football Championship Under-16: 1 ====
Italy: 1982
