= Mario Ielpo =

Italian footballer

Personal information
- Date of birth: 8 June 1963 (age 63)
- Place of birth: Rome, Italy
- Height: 1.84 m (6 ft 0 in)
- Position: Goalkeeper

Youth career
- 1980–1981: Lazio

Senior career*
Years	Team	Apps	(Gls)
1981–1985	Lazio	0	(0)
1984–1985	→ Siena (loan)	34	(0)
1985–1987	Lazio	20	(0)
1987–1993	Cagliari	205	(0)
1993–1996	Milan	3	(0)
1996–1998	Genoa	55	(0)
Total		317	(0)
- * Club domestic league appearances and goals

Mario Ielpo (born 8 June 1963 in Rome) is an Italian former footballer who played as a goalkeeper.

== Career ==
After beginning his career with Lazio, Ielpo had six successful years at Cagliari, before serving as A.C. Milan's reserve keeper during their successful period in the mid-1990s under manager Fabio Capello, behind starter Sebastiano Rossi. He usually only played for the club in Coppa Italia matches. He ended his career in 1998, after two years at Genoa.

== After retirement ==
Ielpo now works as a television pundit, and he is also a qualified lawyer.

== Honours ==
Milan

- Serie A: 1993–94, 1995–96
- Supercoppa Italiana: 1993, 1994
- UEFA Champions League: 1993–94
- UEFA Super Cup: 1994
