= 1993 Supercoppa Italiana =

- Event: Supercoppa Italiana
AC Milan	Torino
Serie A	Coppa Italia
1	0
- Date: 21 August 1993
- Venue: RFK Memorial Stadium, Washington, D.C., U.S.
- Referee: Helder Diaz
- Attendance: 25,268

The 1993 Supercoppa Italiana was a match played by the 1992–93 Serie A winners AC Milan and 1992–93 Coppa Italia winners Torino. It took place on 21 August 1993 at the RFK Memorial Stadium in Washington, D.C., United States. AC Milan won the match 1–0 to earn their third Supercoppa. The match was the first Supercoppa Italiana to be played outside of Italy.

== Match details ==
21 August 1993

AC Milan	1–0	Torino
Simone 4'	Report

Robert F. Kennedy Memorial Stadium, Washington, D.C., USA
Attendance: 25,268
Referee: Helder Diaz

AC Milan	Torino

MILAN:
GK	1	(Italy) Sebastiano Rossi
RB	2	(Italy) Mauro Tassotti
CB	5	(Italy) Alessandro Costacurta
CB	6	(Italy) Franco Baresi (c)
LB	3	(Italy) Paolo Maldini
RM	7	(Italy) Stefano Eranio
CM	4	(Italy) Demetrio Albertini
CM	8	(Croatia) Zvonimir Boban
LM	10	(Federal Republic of Yugoslavia) Dejan Savićević	(substituted off) 60'
RF	9	(Italy) Daniele Massaro
LF	11	(Italy) Marco Simone	(substituted off) 46'
Substitutes:
GK	12	(Italy) Mario Ielpo
CB	13	(Italy) Filippo Galli
LB	14	(Italy) Alessandro Orlando
RM	15	(Italy) Roberto Donadoni	(substituted on) 60'
LF	16	(Romania) Florin Răducioiu	(substituted on) 46'
Manager:
(Italy) Fabio Capello

TORINO:
GK	1	(Italy) Giovanni Galli
RB	2	(Italy) Roberto Mussi
CB	5	(Italy) Angelo Gregucci
CB	7	(Italy) Daniele Fortunato
LB	3	(Croatia) Robert Jarni
RM	8	(Italy) Giorgio Venturin
CM	6	(Italy) Luca Fusi (c)
CM	11	(Italy) Marco Osio	(substituted off) 44'
LM	4	(Italy) Sandro Cois	(substituted off) 72'
SS	10	(Uruguay) Enzo Francescoli
CF	9	(Italy) Andrea Silenzi
Substitutes:
GK	12	(Italy) Luca Pastine
DF	13	(Italy) Giulio Falcone
DF	14	(Italy) Raffaele Sergio
LM	15	(Italy) Gianluca Sordo	(substituted on) 72'
FW	16	(Uruguay) Pato Aguilera	(substituted on) 44'
Manager:
(Italy) Emiliano Mondonico

MATCH OFFICIALS

- Assistant referees:
- Fourth official:

MATCH RULES

- 90 minutes.
- 30 minutes of extra-time if necessary.
- Penalty shoot-out if scores still level.
- Five named substitutes
- Maximum of 2 substitutions.

== See also ==
- 1993–94 AC Milan season
