= Mauro Tassotti =

Italian footballer and manager (born 1960)

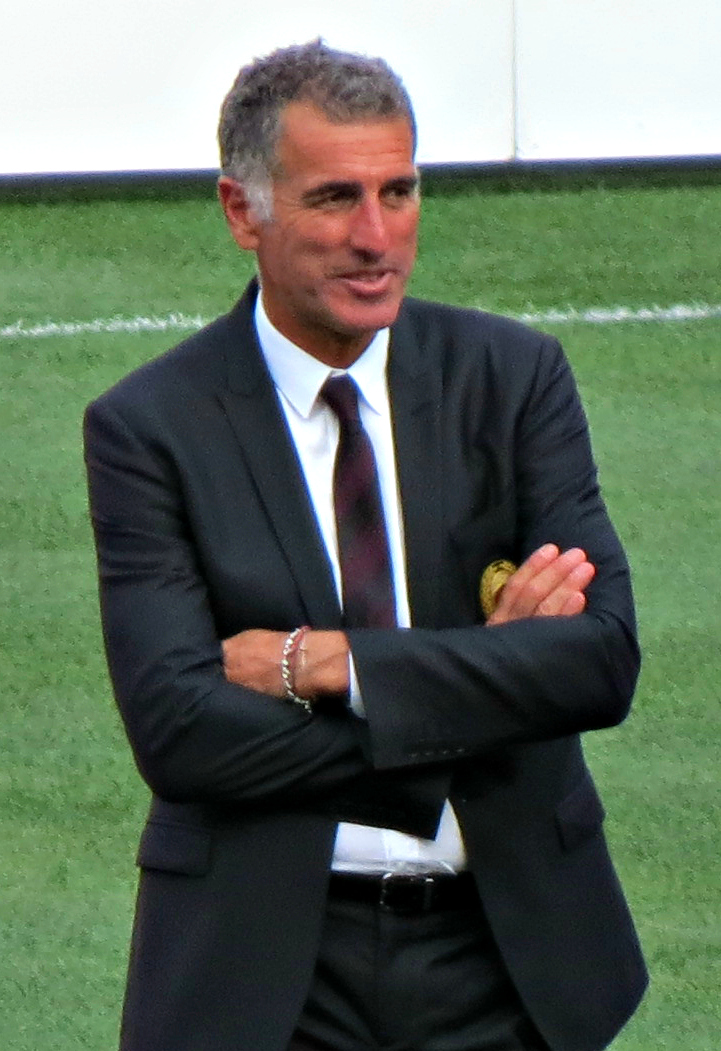
- Tassotti in 2012

Personal information
- Date of birth: 19 January 1960 (age 66)
- Place of birth: Rome, Italy
- Height: 1.77 m (5 ft 10 in)
- Position: Defender

Senior career*
Years	Team	Apps	(Gls)
1978–1980	Lazio	41	(0)
1980–1997	AC Milan	429	(8)
Total		470	(8)

International career
1978–1982	Italy U21	10	(1)
1979	Italy U23	1	(0)
1992–1994	Italy	7	(0)

Managerial career
- 1997–2001: AC Milan (youth)
- 2001: AC Milan (caretaker)
- 2001–2015: AC Milan (assistant)
- 2014: AC Milan (caretaker)
- 2015–2016: AC Milan (scout)
- 2016–2021: Ukraine (assistant)
- 2021–2022: Genoa (assistant)
- 2025–: Milan Futuro (assistant)
Medal record
Representing Italy
FIFA World Cup
Runner-up	1994
- * Club domestic league appearances and goals

Mauro Tassotti (Italian pronunciation: [ˈmauro tasˈsɔtti]; born in Rome, 19 January 1960) is an Italian manager and former footballer who played predominantly as a right back.

After making his Serie A debut with Lazio, he went on to play with AC Milan for 17 years. He won 17 major titles with Milan, including five Serie A championships and three UEFA Champions League tournaments, reaching five finals in total. He is mostly remembered for his role alongside Paolo Maldini, Franco Baresi, Alessandro Costacurta, Filippo Galli and Christian Panucci in the Milan backline under managers Arrigo Sacchi and Fabio Capello, forming what is considered by many in the sport to be one of the greatest defensive line-ups of all time. (Note: See)

An Italian international in the early 1990s, Tassotti only came into the national side under Sacchi, when he was already in his 30s, helping Italy to qualify for the 1994 FIFA World Cup. Tassotti would go on to represent his nation at the final tournament, winning a runners-up medal, although he was banned for the latter half of the tournament. Prior to his Italy senior career, he had previously also represented Italy at under-21 level, and participated at the 1988 Olympics with the under-23 team, finishing in fourth place.

After retiring in 1997, Tassotti remained connected to Milan in several positions: he worked as a youth coach, as an assistant manager, as a caretaker manager and subsequently as a talent scout, until he left the club in 2016 to join the Ukrainian national side as an assistant coach.

== Club career ==
Born in Rome, Tassotti played his first professional season with local club Lazio in 1978–79, where he soon became a first team member the following season, making his Serie A debut on 5 November 1978. During his two seasons with Lazio, he made 41 appearances in Serie A and 47 in all competitions.

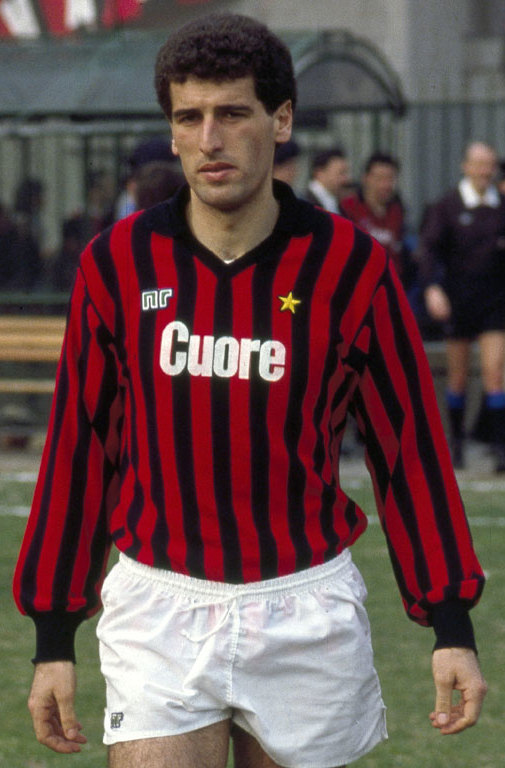
Mauro Tassotti with AC Milan during the 1983–84 season

Following Lazio's and AC Milan's relegation to Serie B due to their involvement in the 1980 match-fixing scandal, he was called upon by the Milanese squad and transferred to the side, becoming a first-team member alongside captain and defender Franco Baresi, as well as Filippo Galli, during a dark period in Milan's footballing history, under manager Nils Liedholm. He made his Milan debut on 24 August 1980, in Serie B, in a 1–0 home win over Catania. Milan won the Serie B title that season to return to Serie A, with Tassotti emerging as one of the club's best performers. Despite winning the Mitropa Cup the following season, Milan were unable to remain in Serie A, finishing third last, and were relegated once again to Serie B. Milan were able to win Serie B again the following season to return to Serie A. Although this was a fairly bleak period in the club's history, as they failed to dominate in the league or capture a trophy, the squad did reach the Coppa Italia final during the 1984–85 season, and were able to regularly qualify for the European competitions, frequently finishing in the top half of the table.

Tassotti became a central figure in the Milan squad of the late 1980s and early 1990s under Arrigo Sacchi, and subsequently Fabio Capello, usually wearing the number 2 shirt. Tassotti was a key component of a strong defence alongside Paolo Maldini, Franco Baresi and Alessandro Costacurta, playing predominantly as a right back and on occasion as a centre back, in front of goalkeepers Giovanni Galli, and subsequently Sebastiano Rossi. The back four of the Milan side of this period is regarded as one of the greatest of all time. Under Sacchi, Tassotti was named vice-captain after Baresi, and he won the 1987–88 Serie A title, followed by the Supercoppa Italiana, and consecutive European Cup titles, in 1989, and 1990. In addition, Tassotti won two Intercontinental Cups (1989, 1990) and two UEFA Super Cups (1989, 1990), also reaching the 1989–90 Coppa Italia final. During the 1987–88 season, Tassotti helped Milan to only concede 14 goals in Serie A, finishing the year with the best defence.

Under Capello, Tassotti would go on to reach three consecutive Champions League finals with Milan, winning the Champions League in 1994 as captain, due to the absence of suspended Franco Baresi, and also reaching the final in 1993 and 1995. He also won three consecutive Serie A titles with the club in the 1991–92, 1992–93 and the 1993–94 seasons, adding another during the 1995–96 season, in addition to the 1994 UEFA Super Cup and three consecutive Supercoppa Italiana titles between 1992 and 1994. In the 1991–92 season, Milan won the title unbeaten, scoring a record 74 goals, and remained undefeated for a record 58 matches in Serie A. In 1993–94, Tassotti once again helped Milan finish the league with the best defence, only conceding 15 goals. In his last few seasons at Milan under Capello, he began to be used less frequently, due to his advancing age and the emergence of Christian Panucci in his position. Along with his teammate Baresi, Tassotti retired from the club at the conclusion of the 1996–97 season. In total, he made 429 Serie A appearances with Milan, scoring 8 goals, and 583 total club appearances, scoring 10 goals.

== International career ==
Tassotti did not win his first cap for Italy until age 32, under Arrigo Sacchi, in a 2–2 home draw against Switzerland in a 1994 FIFA World Cup qualifier on 14 October 1992. This was partly because of an abundance of other world class Italian defenders, as he was constantly overlooked by Sacchi's predecessor Azeglio Vicini, who preferred to deploy full backs he had worked with during his tenure as Italy's under-21 coach, despite Tassotti's excellent club performances. Tassotti had previously played for Italy at under-21 level, and he represented the nation at the 1988 Summer Olympics, alongside Paolo Maldini, where Italy reached the semi-finals, finishing in fourth place.

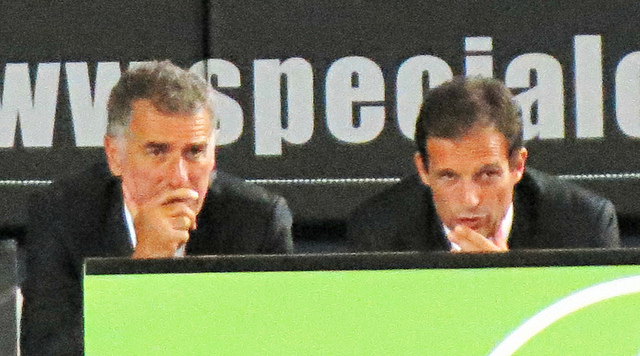
Tassotti and Massimiliano Allegri during the game AC Milan–Real Madrid at Yankee Stadium in New York

After featuring in Italy's 1994 World Cup qualifying matches and international friendlies under Sacchi, Tassotti played in the 1994 edition in the United States, where Italy went on to reach the final, losing to Brazil on penalties. This would be the only tournament in which he would participate with Italy. In the group stage, Tassotti started the 1–0 defeat to the Republic of Ireland and his next appearance was the quarter-final match against Spain. However, in the quarter-final match, Tassotti elbowed Spanish midfielder Luis Enrique in the face during stoppage time in the second half, breaking the Spaniard's nose. The gesture was not seen by the referee, and Tassotti was not called for a foul or cautioned at the time. Italy won the match 2–1. After reviewing the game, FIFA officials banned Tassotti for eight matches, the longest-such ban in World Cup history until Uruguayan striker Luis Suárez's ban in 2014 for biting Italian defender Giorgio Chiellini in his team's final group match. Tassotti never played internationally again. Tassotti later stated he had instantly and deeply regretted his actions, describing them as "stupid", although he would also state the gesture had not been premeditated but purely instinctive, as Luis Enrique had been pulling his shirt. He later personally apologised to Luis Enrique. In total, Tassotti made 7 appearances for Italy between 1992 and 1994.

== Managerial career ==
=== AC Milan ===
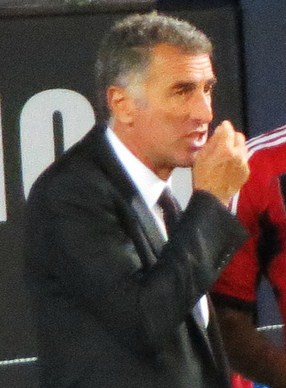
Tassotti assisting for AC Milan

Following his retirement in 1997, Tassotti took up a coaching position in Milan's youth system, winning the Torneo di Viareggio with the AC Milan youth team in 1999 and 2001. In 2001, following the sacking of manager Alberto Zaccheroni, he served as a caretaker manager for the senior club and coached Milan for the remainder of the 2000–01 Serie A season, alongside Cesare Maldini, helping the club to qualify for the UEFA Cup, before being replaced by Fatih Terim at the end of the season. In the 2001–02 season, Tassotti joined Milan's coaching staff under former teammate Carlo Ancelotti as an assistant manager, and retained his post after the latter's departure, under Leonardo, Massimiliano Allegri, Clarence Seedorf and Filippo Inzaghi. In January 2014, he acted as caretaker manager for one match, a 3–1 home win over Spezia for the campaign's Coppa Italia following Massimiliano Allegri's dismissal and before Clarence Seedorf's appointment. In July 2015, he began working as a talent scout for Milan.

=== Ukraine national team ===
Tassotti terminated his contract with Milan on 12 July 2016, concluding his 36-year career with the club. his contract was due to expire in June 2017. It was later reported Tassotti had taken an assistant coaching position with the Ukraine national team, along with Milan Youth System coach Andrea Maldera, under the national team's former assistant manager Andriy Shevchenko, who formerly also played for Milan as a striker and who was named the team's new head coach.

== Style of play ==
Tassotti was mostly used as a right back, but he could also play as centre back when necessary, and often played in this role earlier on in his career. He even played as a central or defensive midfielder on occasion. Regarded as one of Italy's greatest defenders, and as one of the best full backs of his generation, he is mostly remembered for his role alongside Maldini, Baresi, Galli and Costacurta in the legendary Milan backline of the late 1980s and early 1990s, under Sacchi and Capello, which is considered one of the greatest defences of all time. Tassotti was a tenacious, defensive minded full back who was known for his strength, anticipation and defensive awareness, as well as his marking ability, positional sense and tactical intelligence. These attributes made him extremely adept at reading the game and at covering defensively for his teammates, and allowed him to excel in Milan's zonal marking system, which used a high defensive line and the offside trap. While at Lazio, he earned a reputation for being an aggressive and hard-tackling defender as a youngster, with a strong character. At Milan, he developed into a more cautious, composed and consistent player, which led to him being nicknamed "The Professor".

Although Tassotti primarily excelled defensively, he was a modern and versatile full back who was also one of the first players in his position to be capable of being an offensive threat, due to his pace, athleticism, stamina, technique, control, and distribution, as well as his ability to make overlapping attacking runs, dribble, and provide accurate crosses and assists from the right wing. Although he was initially not known for being particularly skilful, Tassotti was later also highly regarded for his elegance on the ball and technical ability, which he was able to improve extensively under the tutelage of manager Nils Liedholm while at Milan. This later led his teammates to give him the nickname the new "Djalma Santos", in addition to his other nickname, "Il Tasso" ("The Badger" in Italian).

== Career statistics ==
=== Club ===
Appearances and goals by club, season and competition
Club	Season	League			Coppa Italia		Europe (Note: Includes UEFA Champions League, UEFA Cup and UEFA Super Cup.)		Other		Total	
Club	Season	Division	Apps	Goals	Apps	Goals	Apps	Goals	Apps	Goals	Apps	Goals
Lazio	1978–79	Serie A	14	0	1	0	–		–		15	0
Lazio	1979–80	Serie A	27	0	5	0	–		–		32	0
Lazio	Total		41	0	6	0	–		–		47	0
AC Milan	1980–81	Serie B	33	0	3	0	–		–		36	0
AC Milan	1981–82	Serie A	24	0	4	0	–		5	0	33	0
AC Milan	1982–83	Serie B	32	0	9	1	–		–		41	1
AC Milan	1983–84	Serie A	30	1	7	0	–		–		37	1
AC Milan	1984–85	Serie A	24	1	10	0	–		–		34	1
AC Milan	1985–86	Serie A	28	0	6	0	6	0	2	0	42	0
AC Milan	1986–87	Serie A	25	1	4	0	–		–		29	1
AC Milan	1987–88	Serie A	28	0	7	0	4	0	–		39	0
AC Milan	1988–89	Serie A	32	2	3	0	9	0	1	0	43	2
AC Milan	1989–90	Serie A	29	3	2	0	9	0	1	0	41	3
AC Milan	1990–91	Serie A	28	0	2	0	6	0	1	0	37	0
AC Milan	1991–92	Serie A	33	0	5	0	–		–		38	0
AC Milan	1992–93	Serie A	27	0	5	0	9	1	1	0	42	1
AC Milan	1993–94	Serie A	21	0	1	0	10	0	2	0	34	0
AC Milan	1994–95	Serie A	12	0	4	0	7	0	2	0	25	0
AC Milan	1995–96	Serie A	15	0	2	0	3	0	–		20	0
AC Milan	1996–97	Serie A	10	0	1	0	1	0	–		12	0
AC Milan	Total		429	8	75	1	64	1	15	0	583	10
Career total			470	8	81	1	64	1	15	0	630	10

=== International ===
Appearances and goals by national team and year
National team	Year	Apps	Goals
Italy	1992	1	0
Italy	1993	1	0
Italy	1994	5	0
Total		7	0

== Honours ==
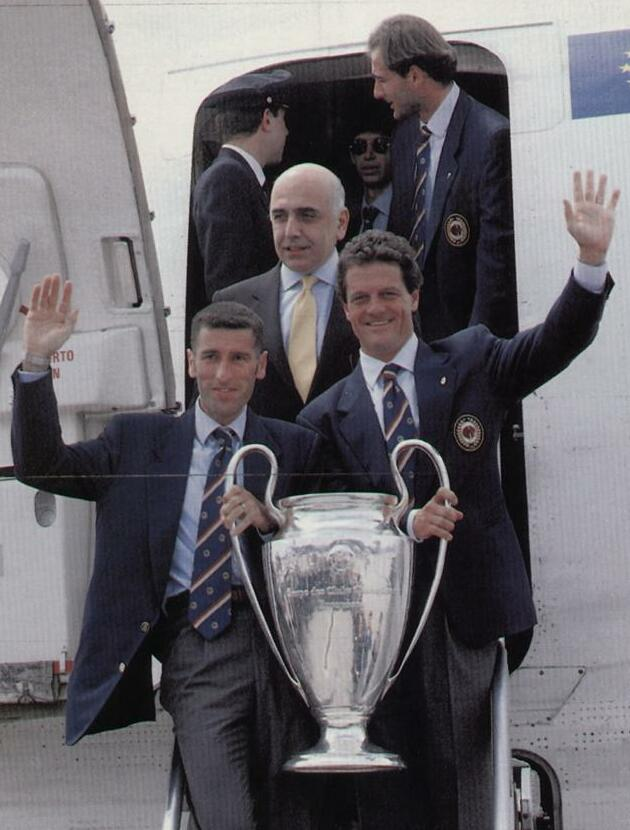
Tassotti (left) holds the UEFA Champions League trophy along with manager Fabio Capello, following Milan's victory in the 1993–94 edition of the tournament.

=== Player ===
AC Milan

- Serie A: 1987–88, 1991–92, 1992–93, 1993–94, 1995–96
- Serie B: 1980–81, 1982–83
- Supercoppa Italiana: 1988, 1992, 1993, 1994
- UEFA Champions League: 1988–89, 1989–90, 1993–94
- UEFA Super Cup: 1989, 1990, 1994
- Intercontinental Cup: 1989, 1990

Italy

- FIFA World Cup runners-up: 1994

Individual

- Serie A Team of The Year: 1987, 1988
- Onze Mondial: 1992, 1993
- Premio Nazionale Carriera Esemplare "Gaetano Scirea": 1996
- AC Milan Hall of Fame
