= Fulvio Simonini =

Italian footballer

Personal information
- Date of birth: 29 March 1961 (age 65)
- Place of birth: Passirano
- Height: 1.72 m (5 ft 8 in)
- Position: Forward

Senior career*
Years	Team	Apps	(Gls)
1980–1986	Atalanta B.C.		
1980–1982	→ Derthona		
1982–1985	→ Virescit Boccaleone		
1986–1987	A.C. Cesena		
1987–1989	Padova		
1989	Udinese		
1990–1991	Reggina		
1991–1992	Venezia		
1992–1993	Piacenza		
1994–1995	Virtus Chianciano		
1995–1998	Trento		
- * Club domestic league appearances and goals

Fulvio Simonini (born 29 March 1961) is a retired Italian football striker.
