= Mario Bortolazzi =

Italian footballer and manager

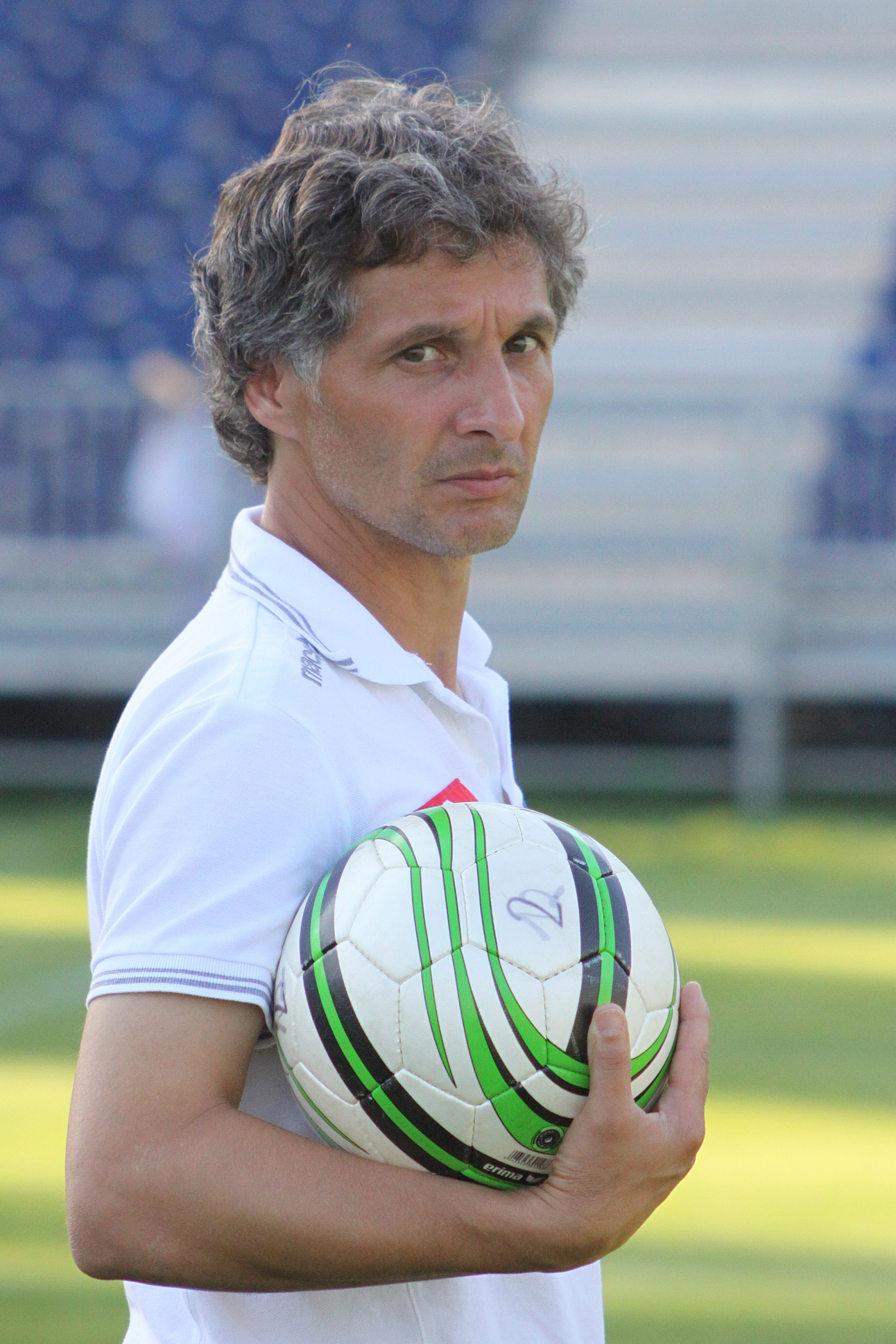

Personal information
- Date of birth: 10 January 1965 (age 61)
- Place of birth: Verona, Italy
- Height: 1.77 m (5 ft 10 in)
- Position: Midfielder

Senior career*
Years	Team	Apps	(Gls)
1980–1982	Mantova	27	(0)
1982–1985	Fiorentina	11	(0)
1985–1986	Milan	7	(0)
1986–1987	Parma	34	(7)
1987–1988	Milan	13	(1)
1988–1989	Verona	33	(4)
1989–1990	Atalanta	20	(2)
1990–1998	Genoa	241	(16)
1998–1999	West Bromwich Albion	35	(2)
1999–2000	Livorno	29	(0)
2000–2002	Lecco	45	(13)
2002–2003	Livorno	17	(1)

Managerial career
- 2005–2006: Livorno (assistant)
- 2006–2008: Italy (assistant)
- 2009: Napoli (assistant)
- * Club domestic league appearances and goals

Mario Bortolazzi (born 10 January 1965, in Verona) is an Italian professional football coach and a former player, who played as a midfielder.

He played 12 seasons (241 games, 14 goals) in the Serie A for ACF Fiorentina, A.C. Milan, Hellas Verona F.C., Atalanta B.C. and Genoa C.F.C.

In his coaching career he has so far has always been an assistant to his former Milan teammate Roberto Donadoni.

== Honours ==
Milan

- Serie A champion: 1987–88.

Genoa

- Anglo-Italian Cup winner: 1995–96.
