= Roberto Lorenzini =

Italian footballer and coach

Personal information
- Date of birth: 9 July 1966 (age 60)
- Place of birth: Milan, Italy
- Height: 1.83 m (6 ft 0 in)
- Position: Defender

Senior career*
Years	Team	Apps	(Gls)
1985–1994	Milan	5	(0)
1987–1990	→ Como (loan)	67	(2)
1990–1993	→ Ancona (loan)	91	(5)
1993–1994	→ Genoa (loan)	22	(1)
1994–1995	Torino	18	(0)
1995–1996	Piacenza	16	(0)
1996–1997	Lucchese	8	(0)
1998–1999	Faenza	35	(2)

International career
1987–1993	Italy U-21	4	(0)

Managerial career
- 2001–2002: Jesina
- 2002–2003: Vis Pesaro
- 2003–2004: Maceratese
- 2006–2007: Varese (youth)
- 2007–2008: Varese
- 2008–2009: Mantova (assistant)
- * Club domestic league appearances and goals

Roberto Lorenzini (born 9 July 1966 in Milan) is an Italian professional football coach and a former player, who served as a defender.

== Playing career ==
A Milan youth product, Lorenzini played for 7 seasons (126 games, 1 goal) in the Serie A for A.C. Milan (10 appearances), Calcio Como, A.C. Ancona, Genoa C.F.C., Torino Calcio, and Piacenza Calcio, later also playing with Serie B side Lucchese, and Serie C2 side Faenza.

== Managerial career ==
In 2008–09 season he served as an assistant manager to his former Milan teammate Alessandro Costacurta at A.C. Mantova, but left together with Costacurta after he resigned due to poor results.

== Honours ==
Milan

- Supercoppa Italiana winner: 1994.
