= Carmelo Mancuso =

Italian footballer (born 1965)

Personal information
- Date of birth: 3 October 1965 (age 61)
- Place of birth: Palermo, Italy
- Height: 1.79 m (5 ft 10 1/2 in)
- Position: Defender

Senior career*
Years	Team	Apps	(Gls)
1981–1982	A.M.A.T. Palermo		
1982–1985	Messina	61	(10)
1985–1986	Milan	4	(0)
1986–1987	Messina	25	(0)
1987–1991	Monza	124	(8)
1991–1993	Giarre	65	(10)
1993–1995	Ascoli	50	(0)
1995–1998	Lecce	40	(0)
1998	Pro Patria		
1999	Igea Virtus		
1999–2000	Barcellona Pozzo di Gotto		
2000	Casarano		
2001	Real Montecchio		
2001–2002	Real Messina		

Managerial career
- 2006–2008: Messina (youth)
- 2014–2015: Spadaforese
- 2015–2016: Giarre
- 2018: Igea 1946
- 2018: Igea 1946
- 2019–2020: FC Messina (youth)
- 2020–2021: FC Messina (assistant)
- 2021: FC Messina
- * Club domestic league appearances and goals

Carmelo Mancuso (born 3 October 1965) is an Italian professional football coach and a former player.

== Club career ==
He played for two seasons (six games, no goals) in the Serie A for Milan and Lecce.

== Managerial career ==
He became a football coach after retiring as a professional footballer. He was the coach of the Primavera youth team of Messina in 2007–08 season.

In 2015, Mancuso became a head coach of Giarre.

On 28 August 2021, he was appointed head coach of FC Messina in Serie D. On 12 October 2021, he was fired after gaining one point in 5 games.
