= Andrea Manzo =

Italian footballer and manager (born 1961)

Personal information
- Date of birth: 5 November 1961 (age 64)
- Place of birth: Mestre, Italy
- Height: 1.78 m (5 ft 10 in)
- Position: Midfielder

Team information
- Current team: Parma (youth team coach)

Senior career*
Years	Team	Apps	(Gls)
1978–1979	Padova	19	(0)
1979–1980	Vicenza	2	(1)
1980–1981	Fiorentina	14	(1)
1981–1982	Sampdoria	25	(3)
1982–1983	Fiorentina	19	(0)
1983–1987	AC Milan	47	(0)
1987–1989	Udinese	60	(4)
1989–1990	Avellino	20	(0)
1990–1992	Casertana	60	(3)
1992–1993	Avellino	14	(0)
1993–1995	Caerano	48	(3)
1995–1997	Mestre	64	(1)

Managerial career
- 2000–2001: Sandonà
- 2001–2003: Conegliano Calcio
- 2003–2004: Pievigina
- 2005: Venezia
- 2006–2007: Portosummaga
- 2008: Parma (caretaker)
- 2010: Chioggia
- 2011–2013: Team Ticino (youth)
- 2015–2016: FC Lugano (youth)
- 2016: FC Lugano
- 2018–2019: FC Chiasso
- * Club domestic league appearances and goals as of 2008-04-25

Andrea Manzo (born 5 November 1961) is an Italian football manager and former midfielder.

== Career ==
=== Playing ===
Manzo started his professional career in 1978 with Padova. He then played for a number of Serie A and Serie B teams, most notably Fiorentina, AC Milan and Udinese. He then decided to spend his final career years back in his native Veneto, with Caerano and then Mestre, before retiring from active football in 1997.

=== Coaching ===
Andrea Manzo started his coaching career in 2000, being appointed at the helm of the Serie C2 team Sandonà. He was successively sacked and then reappointed by the club management in a poor season, which ended with a second consecutive direct relegation. He then coached amateur Eccellenza team Conegliano Calcio the following season, leading them to win the league hands down in his first season and obtaining a fifth place in the club's following Serie D campaign. He then coached Serie D team Pievigina before joining Venezia's managing staff.

Manzo was then appointed caretaker coach during the final days of the arancioneroverdi's Serie B campaign, which ended with the club being relegated and then cancelled from football. Successively, Venezia were refounded and started back from Serie C2, with Manzo being appointed as the new club's first boss. His second personal spell at Venezia however proved not to be lucky, as he was sacked during the season because of poor results.

In 2006, he agreed a contract with Portosummaga of Serie C2, leading his side to a fairly good season. He was successively appointed as youth team coach of Parma.

On 12 May 2008, he was surprisingly appointed as caretaker coach, replacing Hector Cúper, with the goal to defeat top flight league leaders Internazionale in the Serie A 2007-08's final matchday in order to save the ducali from relegation to Serie B, a goal he failed to achieve as Parma lost 2–0 to the nerazzurri, returning to Serie B after 18 years in the top flight.
