= Francesco Zanoncelli =

Italian footballer and coach

Personal information
- Full name: Francesco Zanoncelli
- Date of birth: September 11, 1967 (age 59)
- Place of birth: Milan, Italy
- Height: 1.77 m (5 ft 9 1/2 in)
- Position: Centre back

Senior career*
Years	Team	Apps	(Gls)
1986–1987	A.C Milan	6	(0)
1987–1988	Empoli	23	(0)
1988–1989	Monza	31	(0)
1989	Atalanta	4	(0)
1989–1990	Brescia	18	(0)
1990–1992	Padova	70	(1)
1992–1995	Ascoli	101	(10)
1995–1997	Lecce	58	(1)
1997–1999	Cagliari	63	(0)
1999–2000	Brescia	34	(2)
2000–2001	Genoa	28	(0)
2001–2002	Crotone	23	(0)
2002–2003	SPAL	23	(0)

International career
1986–1990	Italy U-21	23	(2)

Managerial career
- 2006–2007: Giacomense
- 2007–2008: Pizzighettone
- 2008–2009: Salò
- 2009–2010: Carpenedolo
- 2017–2018: South West Queensland Thunder
- * Club domestic league appearances and goals

Francesco Zanoncelli (born September 11, 1967 in Milan) is an Italian professional football coach and a former player.

== Playing career ==
He played for two seasons in the Serie A for AC Milan, Atalanta, and one season in Serie B for Cagliari. In total, he played 56 games and had 52 starts.

== Coaching career ==
In 2006, Zanoncelli embarked on a career as a coach in the minor leagues of Italian football. He successively moved to Australia to become a coach at the Kelvin Grove State College as well as the Brisbane Roar FC in the A league Men, also coaching at Ambrose Treacy College.

In 2022, he moved back to Italy to work with SPAL as a technical collaborator. He then briefly worked with Fiorenzuola as their Under-19 youth coach from October to December 2023.
