= Filippo Galli =

Italian footballer and manager

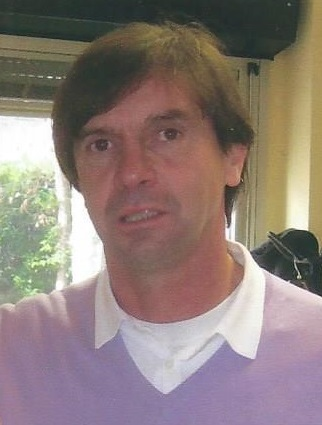
- Galli in 2012

Personal information
- Date of birth: 19 May 1963 (age 63)
- Place of birth: Monza, Italy
- Height: 1.81 m (5 ft 11 in)
- Position: Defender

Youth career
- 1981–1982: Milan

Senior career*
Years	Team	Apps	(Gls)
1982–1996	Milan	217	(3)
1982–1983	→ Pescara (loan)	28	(2)
1996–1998	Reggiana	54	(2)
1998–2001	Brescia	93	(2)
2001–2002	Watford	28	(1)
2002–2004	Pro Sesto	38	(1)
Total		458	(11)

International career
1984–1987	Italy U-21	7	(0)

Managerial career
- 2006–2008: Milan Primavera
- 2008–2009: Milan (Technical Assistant)
- 2009–2018: Milan youth system
- * Club domestic league appearances and goals

Filippo Galli (born 19 May 1963) is an Italian football manager and former player, who played as a defender.

He is mostly remembered for his lengthy and successful spell with AC Milan, where he played alongside Baresi, Maldini, Costacurta, and Tassotti, forming a strong defensive line-up under managers Arrigo Sacchi and Fabio Capello, in the teams which were respectively known as The Immortals and The Invincibles; during his 15 seasons with the club, he won five Serie A titles and three UEFA Champions League titles, among other trophies.

== Club career ==
Born in Monza, Galli played for AC Milan from 1983 to November 1996, after initially being a member of the club's youth sector. He made his Milan debut in Serie A on 18 September 1983, in a 4–2 home win over Verona. During his 13 seasons with the club, he enjoyed many domestic and international successes under managers Arrigo Sacchi and Fabio Capello, winning five Serie A titles, three European Cups, two Intercontinental Cups, three European Super Cups, and four Italian Super Cups; he also scored 4 goals for the club in 325 appearances: 3 in Serie A, in 217 appearances, and 1 in the Coppa Italia, with his final goal coming against Brescia on 4 September 1991. He was initially an important member of the starting line-up alongside teammates Franco Baresi, Mauro Tassotti, and Paolo Maldini, featuring in what is considered to be one of the greatest defences of all time. (Note: See) He played a key role during Milan's 1987–88 Serie A triumph, as Milan only conceded 12 goals in 30 league games, finishing with the best defence in Italy. However, due to injuries, and the emergence of Alessandro Costacurta in his position, he began to find less space in the starting line-up, and was usually used as a substitute in later years, although he was still able to contribute to important victories with the club, notably helping Milan to keep a clean-sheet with a dominant defensive performance, as they defeated Barcelona 4–0 in the 1994 UEFA Champions League Final.

Before joining the Milan senior side, Galli initially made his professional debut whilst on loan with Pescara during the 1982–83 season. Following his time with Milan, he was sold to Reggiana in 1996, another Serie A team. After two seasons with Reggiana, he moved to Brescia for two seasons, helping the club to Serie A promotion, during the 1999–2000 Serie B season, and subsequently helping the team to avoid relegation and qualify for the 2001 UEFA Intertoto Cup the following season, playing alongside Roberto Baggio, under manager Carlo Mazzone. At the age of 38, he successively spent a season at Watford whilst Gianluca Vialli was the team's manager, scoring once against Walsall.

== International career ==
Galli never played for the Italy senior team, although he was capped for the Italy under-21 side on 7 occasions between 1984 and 1987, and he took part with Italy at the 1984 UEFA European Under-21 Championship, where they reached the semi-final. He was also a member of Italy's squad at the 1984 Summer Olympics, where they managed a fourth-place finish.

== Style of play ==
Galli was known for his man-marking ability and defensive awareness; he read games well, and was usually used as a centre-back, although he was often called on to fill in at any defensive position, and also played at right-back, and as sweeper on occasion.

Despite his ability, he often struggled with injuries throughout his career, and predominantly served as a backup in his later career, following the emergence of younger players.

== After retirement ==
Galli retired in 2004, aged 41, after two seasons with minor Serie C2 club Pro Sesto. Following his retirement, he began a coaching career, and he has been responsible for the AC Milan youth system for many years. In August 2008, he began working for the first team, and he became Carlo Ancelotti's assistant coach, alongside his former teammate Tassotti. Following Ancelotti's departure in 2009, he became a technical assistant of the new head coach Leonardo Araújo. Galli also worked as a pundit on occasion. In September 2012, he began the coaching course in Coverciano.

== Honours ==
Milan

- Serie A: 1987–88, 1991–92, 1992–93, 1993–94, 1995–96; runner-up: 1989–90, 1990–91
- Coppa Italia runner-up: 1984–85, 1989–90
- Supercoppa Italiana: 1988, 1992, 1993, 1994; runner-up: 1996
- UEFA Champions League: 1988–89, 1989–90, 1993–94; runner-up: 1992–93, 1994–95
- UEFA Super Cup: 1989, 1990, 1994; runner-up: 1993
- Intercontinental Cup: 1989, 1990; runner-up: 1993, 1994

Individual

- Serie A Team of The Year: 1984
- AC Milan Hall of Fame
