= Alessandro Costacurta =

Italian footballer (born 1966)

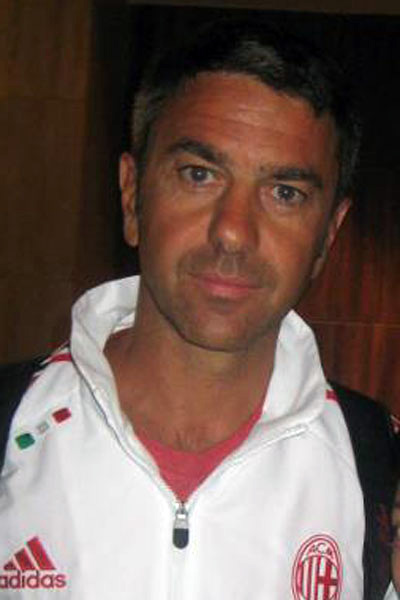
- Costacurta in 2011

Personal information
- Full name: Alessandro Costacurta
- Date of birth: 24 April 1966 (age 60)
- Place of birth: Jerago con Orago, Italy
- Height: 1.83 m (6 ft 0 in)
- Position: Defender

Youth career
- Asso
- 1979–1986: AC Milan

Senior career*
Years	Team	Apps	(Gls)
1986–2007	AC Milan	458	(3)
1986–1987	→ Monza (loan)	30	(0)
Total		488	(3)

International career
1986–1990	Italy U21	8	(0)
1991–1998	Italy	59	(2)

Managerial career
- 2008–2009: Mantova
Medal record
Representing Italy
FIFA World Cup
Runner-up	1994
- * Club domestic league appearances and goals

Alessandro Costacurta (born 24 April 1966) is an Italian former professional footballer who played as a defender. Widely regarded as one of the best defenders of his generation, due to his defensive skills and spending his entire career at one single club.

Throughout his club career, Costacurta spent over twenty years with AC Milan between 1986 and 2007, as well as a brief season-long spell on loan at Monza. He is best known for his role alongside Franco Baresi, Paolo Maldini, and Mauro Tassotti, forming one of the greatest defences in Serie A and European football during the late 1980s and 1990s, under the success of managers Arrigo Sacchi and Fabio Capello. He mainly operated as a central defender, and was a leading exponent of the position, receiving international acclaim, winning 7 Serie A titles and 5 Champions League/European Cup trophies throughout his career, along with many other trophies. Costacurta retired from professional football at the age of 41, on 19 May 2007. In his final match for Milan, he scored a goal from a penalty in a 3–2 defeat against Udinese, becoming the oldest goalscorer in Serie A, a record that was broken by Zlatan Ibrahimović in 2023 who also scored from the spot against Udinese aged 41 five months and 15 days.

Along with his Milan teammates, Costacurta was also an important member of the Italy national side during the 1990s. He made 59 appearances for Italy, scoring 2 goals, and he participated in two World Cups (in 1994 and 1998), as well as a European Championship in 1996. With Italy, he managed to reach the 1994 World Cup Final, which was lost against Brazil on penalties.

== Club career ==
=== Early AC Milan career and Monza loan ===
Alessandro Costacurta was affectionally known to his fans as "Billy", due to his thin physique in his youth, and his notable skill at basketball (as the local basketball team of Milan, Olimpia Milano, was referred to as "Billy" during the late 1970s, the team's main shirt sponsor). Originally an AC Milan youth side product, during his professional career Costacurta would go on to play for the senior club for over 20 seasons, after a brief spell on loan at Monza in Serie C1 during the 1986–87 season. Costacurta was already a young member of the senior squad during the 1985–86 season, but failed to make a single appearance.

Before being sent to Monza on loan, Costacurta would make his Milan debut in the Coppa Italia during the 1986–87 season, but would not make his Serie A debut with Milan until the following year, under Arrigo Sacchi. Costacurta made his first Serie A appearance on 25 October 1987 against Hellas Verona on the sixth matchday of the season. Milan would go on to win the match 1–0, as well as the Serie A title, but Costacurta received limited playing opportunities that season, due to the presence of the more experienced Filippo Galli in his position. Overall, Costacurta managed 7 appearances in Serie A, and one appearance in the Coppa Italia that season.

=== Success under Sacchi and Capello ===
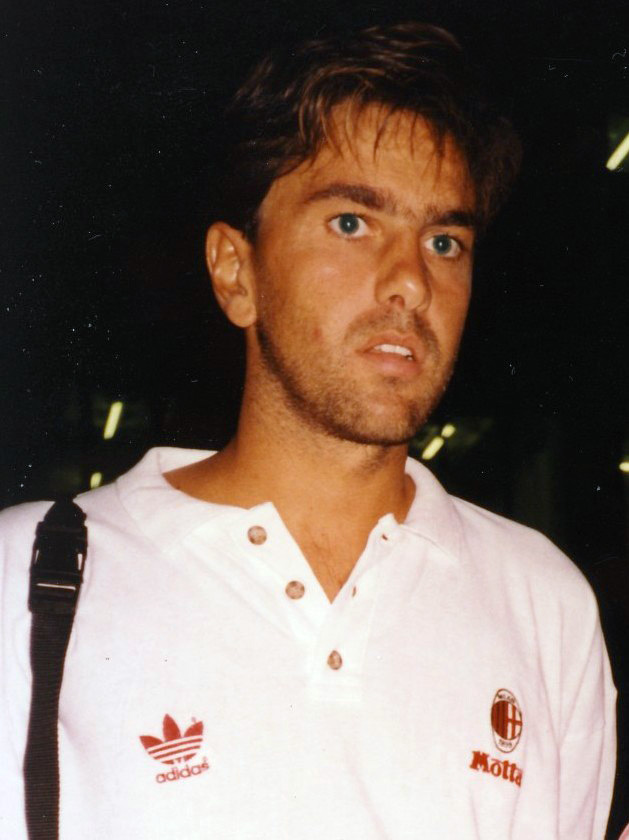
Costacurta in 1992

The 1988–89 season would see Costacurta gain more playing opportunities and appear more frequently for the club, as he would feature in Milan's 3–1 win over Sampdoria in the 1988 Supercoppa Italiana. He would make 26 appearances in Serie A that season, and would also win his first European Cup title after Milan defeated Steaua București 4–0 at the Camp Nou, Barcelona. Costacurta played the first 74 minutes of the final before being substituted by Filippo Galli.

During the 1989–90 Season, Costacurta won his second consecutive European Cup with Milan, defeating Benfica 1–0 in the final in Vienna, and starting the play which led to Frank Rijkaard's match-winning goal. He also featured in Milan's Intercontinental Cup win in Tokyo over Atlético Nacional, and in the European Supercup victory over Johan Cruyff's Barcelona. Costacurta also scored his first goal in Serie A during that season, in a 3–1 away defeat to Milanese rivals Internazionale in the Derby della Madonnina. Milan would also reach the Coppa Italia final that season. In Sacchi's final season at the club, Costacurta would become a starting centreback alongside Franco Baresi, as well as full-backs Mauro Tassotti and Paolo Maldini, in Sacchi's four-man defensive line, which is regarded as one of the greatest defences of all time. (Note: See) Costacurta would make 25 appearances in Serie A that season, and he would also win his second consecutive Intercontinental Cup and European Super Cup trophies.

Under Capello's Milan, Costacurta continued to be a permanent member of the starting line-up, and he won four Serie A titles (including three consecutive titles in 1991–92, 1992–93 and 1993–94, as well as another title in 1995–96), a Champions League title in 1994, an UEFA Super Cup in 1994, as well as three consecutive Italian Supercups in 1992, 1993 and 1994. Milan also managed to reach three consecutive Champions League finals between 1992–93 and 1994–95. However, Costacurta missed the 1994 Champions League final win over Barcelona on 18 May because of a suspension, having been sent-off in the semi-final match against Monaco. Costacurta also helped Milan to win the 1991–92 Serie A title undefeated, as Milan went on an Italian record of 58 matches unbeaten. He also played a key role in Milan's defensive line in the 1993–94 title, by only conceding 15 goals all season, as Milan finished the season with the best defence in Italy.

=== Post-1996 crisis and Zaccheroni era ===
Following Capello's departure after the 1995–96 title win, as well as the aging and retirement of certain key players, Milan faced dark times in their history, failing to qualify for European competitions in both 1996–97 and 1997–98 seasons, and undergoing several managerial changes. However, Costacurta, through his joint leadership in defense alongside Maldini, continued to be a key member of the starting line-up. With the arrival of Alberto Zaccheroni during the 1998–99 season, Costacurta featured in Zaccheroni's new three-man defense alongside Maldini and Luigi Sala; during this time he usually played in the middle of the back three.

Costacurta was also named Milan's vice-captain that season, behind Maldini, following the retirement of Baresi and Tassotti. At the end of the season, Milan managed to capture their 16th Scudetto win, and Costacurta's sixth in total, finishing ahead of Lazio by a single point. However, the next two seasons would see Milan undergo yet another trophy drought, suffering early eliminations in the first and second round of Champions League during those two seasons. Zaccheroni was sacked midway through the 2000–01 season, and replaced with Cesare Maldini as a temporary caretaker.

=== Continued success under Ancelotti ===
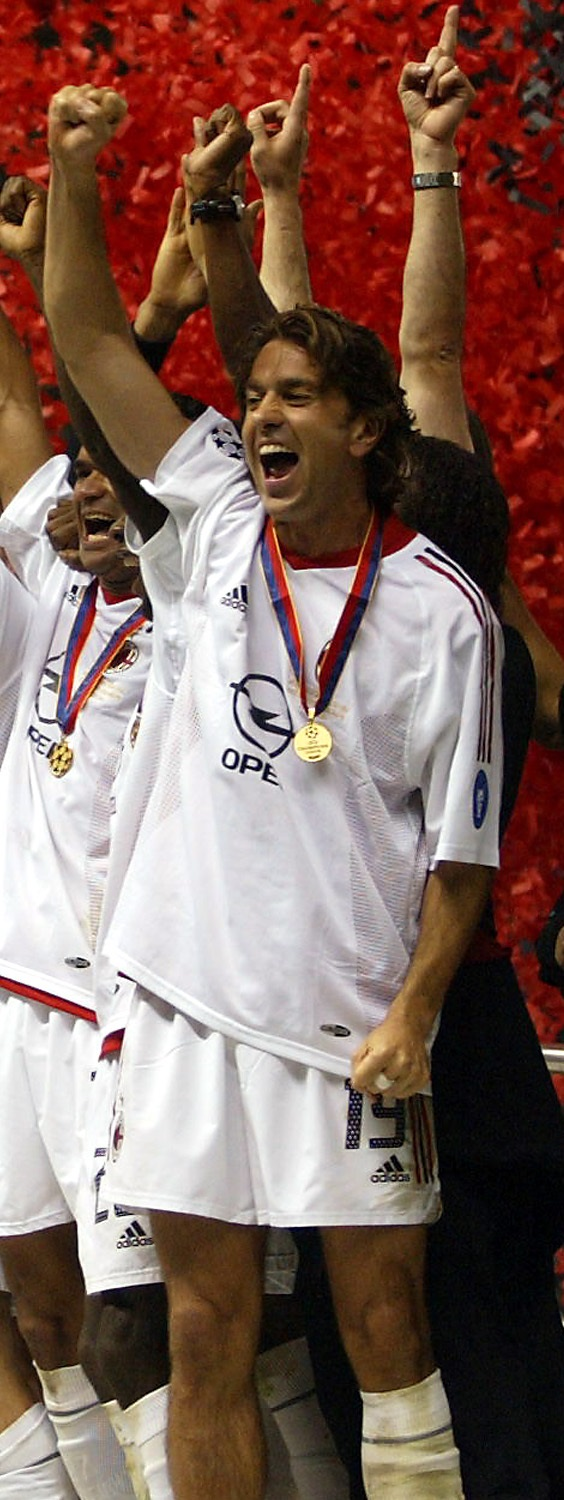
Costacurta celebrating the win of the 2002–03 UEFA Champions League

For the 2001–02 season, Fatih Terim was appointed as Milan's coach, but after the first eight matches, and negative results, Costacurta's former Milan teammate Carlo Ancelotti was appointed manager, leading the team to a fourth-place finish in Serie A and reaching the semi-finals in the UEFA Cup. Ancelotti's arrival and several new signings would bring about a new era of European and Italian dominance for Milan, and Costacurta would form part of another excellent defence, which included players such as Maldini, Alessandro Nesta, Jaap Stam and Cafu.

At the end of the season, in 2002, Costacurta's contract was expiring – he therefore decided to leave the club at age 36 following their American exhibition tour in the summer to pursue a Master's in Economics in the United States. However, Milan lacked defenders in their squad due to injuries, and Adriano Galliani recalled Costacurta to renew his contract the night before the second leg of their crucial UEFA Champions League playoff match against Czech side Slovan Liberec, on which they narrowly qualified on away goals.

Milan finished third in Serie A that season, and Costacurta won his first ever Coppa Italia with the club, overcoming Roma in the final. Under Ancelotti, Costacurta would be employed at both centre-back and right-back during this season. Despite difficulties encountered in qualifying, Milan reached the Champions League final that season, in the first ever all-Italian final against Serie A rivals Juventus. On 28 May 2003, Milan captured the Champions League after defeating Juventus 3–2 on penalties following a 0–0 draw after extra time. Costacurta started the match at right back, and was substituted in the 65th minute, coming off for Roque Júnior. This was Costacurta's fourth career Champions League title.

In the following season, Costacurta missed the decisive penalty in the shootout of the 2003 Intercontinental Cup final against Boca Juniors. Aged 37, Costacurta won his seventh and final league title with Milan, being only surpassed by Virginio Rosetta, Giuseppe Furino, Giovanni Ferrari and Gianluigi Buffon in Serie A history, with eight titles each. In 2004, Costacurta was elected 50th in the UEFA Golden Jubilee online poll, which celebrated the best European footballers from the past 50 years.

=== Later years ===
Costacurta's play time was gradually reduced from 2004 onwards, being an unused substitute in the 2005 Champions League final in Istanbul against Liverpool. After coming back from a 3–0 score in the second half, Liverpool ended up winning the title in the resulting penalty shootout. Costacurta was set to retire from Milan at the end of the 2005–06 season, but later signed a one-year extension at age 40. On 21 November 2006, he became the oldest footballer ever to play in the Champions League, in Milan's 1–0 loss to AEK Athens, at 40 years and 211 days, topping the previous record held by Belgian goalkeeper Dany Verlinden at 40 years and 116 days. Costacurta's record was later broken by Marco Ballotta, who on 11 December 2007, played a match at age 43 years and 253 days for Lazio against Real Madrid.

Costacurta began his final professional season with the club at age 40. During the season, he won his fifth UEFA Champions League title with Milan, again as an unused substitute in the final. On 7 May 2007, at age 41, he announced his retirement, effective at the end of the 2006–07 season. He made his final home start in Milan's 3–2 loss to Udinese on 19 May 2007, converting a penalty that marked his first Serie A goal since the 1991–92 season (15 years after his left-footed volley against Roma on 3 November 1991), and left the pitch near the end of the match to a standing ovation. With this goal, he became the oldest goalscorer in Serie A, at the age of 41 years and 25 days, surpassing the previous record held by Silvio Piola, who in Novara–Milan, on 7 February 1954, scored a goal at 40 years, six months and nine days. Costacurta also became the oldest outfield player to play in a Serie A match. The only players to have played in a match at a more senior age were goalkeepers Marco Ballotta (44 years and 38 days), Alberto Fontana (41 years and 297 days), Francesco Antonioli (41 years and 243 days) and Dino Zoff (41 years and 76 days). After the match, Costacurta's Milan teammates entered the pitch wearing a replica of his jersey as a tribute.

With Milan, Costacurta won the Scudetto seven times and the European Cup/UEFA Champions League five times, in 1989, 1990, 1994, 2003 and 2007. Costacurta also won a Coppa Italia, five Supercoppa Italiana, four UEFA Supercups and two Intercontinental Cups with Milan. Costacurta made 662 appearances for Milan throughout his career, with 458 in Serie A, 78 in the Coppa Italia, 108 in European Competitions, 5 appearances in the Intercontinental Cup final, 6 in the Italian Super Cup final, and 7 in the UEFA Super Cup final. He is the third highest appearances holder for Milan in official matches, only behind Franco Baresi (719) and Paolo Maldini (902).

== International career ==
Between 1986 and 1990, Costacurta made eight appearances with the Italian under-21 side, participating in two European Championships in 1988, where Italy reached the quarter-finals, and in 1990, where Italy reached the semi-finals.

A mainstay in the Italy national team throughout the 1990s, Costacurta played for his country in three major tournaments: the 1994 and 1998 World Cups, as well as Euro 1996. He received his first senior call-up under Azeglio Vicini on 22 December 1990, but he made his debut for the senior team on 13 November 1991, at age 25, in a 1–1 draw against Norway in Genoa. He later became a regular first-team member under his former Milan coach Arrigo Sacchi, who replaced Vicini in 1991 after Italy failed to qualify for Euro 1992 in Sweden. Costacurta scored his first goal for Italy on 4 June 1992 from a penalty in a 2–0 against the Republic of Ireland during Italy's U.S. Cup run, where they finished in second place to the host nation in the friendly tournament.

Costacurta was a starting member in Italy's defensive line at the 1994 World Cup. He helped Italy reach the final, putting in strong defensive performances alongside Milan teammate Paolo Maldini, in particular following fellow Milan centre-back Franco Baresi's injury, and fellow Milan right-back Mauro Tassotti's suspension. He notably helped a ten-man Italy to keep a clean sheet in their second group match against Norway. However, after missing out on the 1994 Champions League final through suspension, he also missed the 1994 World Cup final loss on penalties to Brazil, again due to suspension, after receiving a yellow card in the semi-final match against Bulgaria. Costacurta started in Euro 1996 for Italy, as they were eliminated in the first round, in a group with the two eventual finalists, the Czech Republic and Germany.

Costacurta was once again a key member of Italy's defence in the 1998 World Cup under manager Cesare Maldini, starting in all five of Italy's matches and helping the team to keep three clean sheets. Italy were eliminated in the quarter-final to hosts and eventual champions France on penalties once again after a 0–0 draw following extra time, even though Costacurta converted Italy's third penalty. Despite Dino Zoff's intention to use him in the Italy squad for the Euro 2000 qualifying campaign, Costacurta retired from international duty in 1998, with 59 caps and two goals, after Italy's elimination from the World Cup.

== Style of play ==
Alessandro Costacurta is frequently cited by football analysts and peers as a significant figure in defensive history. During his career at AC Milan, he was a key component of several prominent defensive lines, most notably alongside Paolo Maldini, Franco Baresi, and Mauro Tassotti, as well as later teammates such as Alessandro Nesta and Jaap Stam.

His professional longevity was supported by his ability to play in many positions; while he primarily operated as a man-marking center-back, he also played as a sweeper, full-back, or defensive midfielder. This adaptability contributed to a high volume of domestic and international trophies with both Milan and the Italian national team.

Costacurta was a complete, hard-working and experienced defender who was also gifted with good distribution and crossing ability, as well as a solid technique and first touch, which he developed further as his career progressed, despite not initially being the most naturally skillful player on the ball; this enabled him to be comfortable in possession, carry the ball forward into midfield, and start attacking plays from the back-line. He was a tenacious yet disciplined defender with fast reactions who was known in particular for his exceptional tactical intelligence as well as his timing and strong, precise tackling ability. He was also quick-thinking, mobile, effective in the air, and had an outstanding ability to read the game and anticipate plays, despite his lack of notable pace, physical strength or athletic attributes, due to his slender build. He was an extremely precise and attentive footballer who excelled both at man marking as well as in a zonal marking system, due to his excellent positional and organisational sense, communication, awareness and his ability to play the offside trap effectively. Despite being a defender, he was an accurate penalty taker who often took penalties for his team in shoot-outs. He also stood out for his class, leadership and professionalism on the pitch, as well as his longevity throughout his career. In July 2014, compatriot and 2006 Ballon d'Or winner Fabio Cannavaro described Costacurta as the best defender with whom he had ever played. In 2015, The Telegraph included him at number two in their list of "The top 20 most under-rated footballers of all time."

== Post-playing and managerial career ==
After his retirement, in 2007–08 Costacurta was a member of Carlo Ancelotti's coaching staff at Milan as a technical assistant, while earning his own coaching badges. At the end of the season, he successfully earned his badges and various Italian media reported that he was pursuing a managerial role of his own. However, he refused a position at Pisa offered by new club owner Luca Pomponi immediately after the completion of his takeover of the club, citing his need to remain at Milan in order to stay at home and take care of his son while his wife was on tour with the theater.

On 27 October 2008, Costacurta was unveiled as new coach of Serie B promotion candidates Mantova, then 13th in the table, following the dismissal of previous boss Giuseppe Brucato. However, his time at Mantova proved to be unsuccessful, as he failed to improve Mantova's results and ultimately leading him to tend his resignation from the coaching post following a 1–0 loss to Vicenza that left his club only four points above the relegation zone.

In 2010 he was hired by Sky Italia as a football pundit, becoming one of the main sports personalities from the TV channel and being featured in many of the channel's shows.

== Personal life ==
Costacurta is married to former Miss Italia Martina Colombari, and has one son, Achille.

Costacurta is known for his vocal criticism of homophobia and discrimination against women. In a 2012 interview with Italian newspaper Il Corriere della Sera, he stated that footballers should be allowed to be open about their sexuality.

On 26 July 2021, his mother, Margherita Beccegato, died in a car accident at the age of 87.

== Career statistics ==
=== Club ===
Appearances and goals by club, season and competition
Club	Season	League			Coppa Italia		Europe (Note: Includes the UEFA Champions League, UEFA Cup, and UEFA Super Cup)		Other		Total	
Club	Season	Division	Apps	Goals	Apps	Goals	Apps	Goals	Apps	Goals	Apps	Goals
AC Milan	1986–87	Serie A	0	0	2	0	–		–		2	0
AC Milan	1987–88	Serie A	7	0	1	0	–		–		8	0
AC Milan	1988–89	Serie A	26	0	7	0	7	0	1	0	41	0
AC Milan	1989–90	Serie A	26	1	3	0	10	0	1	0	40	1
AC Milan	1990–91	Serie A	25	0	3	0	6	0	1	0	35	0
AC Milan	1991–92	Serie A	30	1	6	0	–		–		36	1
AC Milan	1992–93	Serie A	31	0	6	0	10	0	1	0	48	0
AC Milan	1993–94	Serie A	30	0	2	0	13	0	2	0	47	0
AC Milan	1994–95	Serie A	27	0	3	0	8	0	2	0	40	0
AC Milan	1995–96	Serie A	30	0	3	0	7	0	–		40	0
AC Milan	1996–97	Serie A	30	0	3	0	5	0	1	0	39	0
AC Milan	1997–98	Serie A	29	0	8	0	–		–		37	0
AC Milan	1998–99	Serie A	29	0	3	0	–		–		32	0
AC Milan	1999–2000	Serie A	27	0	2	0	5	0	1	0	35	0
AC Milan	2000–01	Serie A	18	0	2	0	9	0	–		29	0
AC Milan	2001–02	Serie A	21	0	3	0	7	0	–		31	0
AC Milan	2002–03	Serie A	18	0	5	0	10	0	–		33	0
AC Milan	2003–04	Serie A	22	0	5	0	8	0	1	0	36	0
AC Milan	2004–05	Serie A	14	0	3	0	5	0	–		22	0
AC Milan	2005–06	Serie A	15	0	3	0	3	0	–		21	0
AC Milan	2006–07	Serie A	3	1	5	0	3	0	–		11	1
AC Milan	Total		458	3	78	0	116	0	11	0	663	3
Monza (loan)	1986–87	Serie C1	30	0	–		–		1 (Note: Appearance in Coppa Italia Serie C)	0	31	0
Career total			488	3	78	0	116	0	12	0	694	3

=== International ===
Appearances and goals by national team and year
National team	Year	Apps	Goals
Italy	1991	2	0
Italy	1992	8	1
Italy	1993	5	0
Italy	1994	14	1
Italy	1995	5	0
Italy	1996	6	0
Italy	1997	11	0
Italy	1998	8	0
Total		59	2

=== Managerial ===
As of 4 March 2013

Team	Nat	From	To	Record							
Team	Nat	From	To	G	W	D	L	Win %	GF	GA	GD
Mantova	(Italy)	27 October 2008	9 February 2009	13	4	4	5	30.77	15	19	–4
Total				13	4	4	5	30.77	15	19	–4

== Honours ==
=== Player ===
AC Milan

- Serie A: 1987–88, 1991–92, 1992–93, 1993–94, 1995–96, 1998–99, 2003–04
- Coppa Italia: 2002–03
- Supercoppa Italiana: 1988, 1992, 1993, 1994, 2004
- European Cup/UEFA Champions League: 1988–89, 1989–90, 1993–94, 2002–03, 2006–07
- European Super Cup/UEFA Super Cup: 1989, 1990, 1994
- Intercontinental Cup: 1989, 1990

Italy

- FIFA World Cup runners-up: 1994

Individual

- Premio Nazionale Carriera Esemplare "Gaetano Scirea": 2000
- UEFA Golden Jubilee Poll: #50
- AC Milan Hall of Fame
