= Arrigo Sacchi =

Italian association football manager

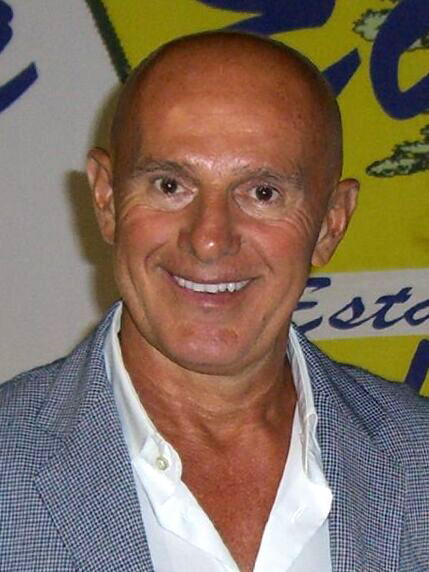
- Sacchi in 2007

Personal information
- Full name: Arrigo Sacchi
- Date of birth: 1 April 1946 (age 80)
- Place of birth: Fusignano, Italy
- Height: 1.70 m (5 ft 7 in)

Managerial career
- Years: Team
- 1973–1976: Fusignano
- 1976–1977: Alfonsine
- 1977–1978: Bellaria
- 1982–1983: Rimini
- 1984–1985: Rimini
- 1985–1987: Parma
- 1987–1991: AC Milan
- 1991–1996: Italy
- 1996–1997: AC Milan
- 1998–1999: Atlético Madrid
- 2001: Parma
Medal record
Men's football
Representing Italy (as manager)
FIFA World Cup
Runner-up	1994

Arrigo Sacchi (born 1 April 1946) is an Italian former football executive and manager, best known for having managed AC Milan and the Italy national team. Regarded as one of the greatest managers of all time, his Milan side (1987–1991) is widely regarded to be one of the greatest club squads of all time.

Sacchi won the Serie A title in his debut season and then dominated European football by winning back to back European Cups in 1989 and 1990. From 1991 to 1996, he was head coach of Italy and led them to the 1994 FIFA World Cup final, where they lost to Brazil in a penalty shoot-out.

Sacchi was never a professional football player and, for many years, worked as a shoe salesman. This led to his famous quote directed at those who questioned his qualifications: "I never realised that in order to become a jockey you have to have been a horse first." Another famous Sacchi quote is that "football is the most important of the least important things in life".

== Career ==
=== Early career ===
Sacchi had grown up watching attacking sides, such as Budapest Honvéd, Real Madrid, Brazil and the Netherlands. He started his career managing his local club, Baracca Lugo, because he was not good enough to play for them. Of the challenge he faced, Sacchi said, "I was twenty-six, my goalkeeper was thirty-nine and my centre-forward was thirty-two. I had to win them over." He next coached at Bellaria before joining Cesena, who were in the Serie B, as a youth team coach. He then took over at Rimini, who were playing in the Serie C1, and almost led them to a title.

He received his breakthrough when he moved to Fiorentina as a youth coach. His achievements with the youth team earned interest from Parma, who were then playing in Serie C1. He led Parma to promotion in his first season, and in the following season took them to within 3 points of promotion to Serie A. Of greater importance to his time at Parma, however, was the team's performance in the Coppa Italia; they beat AC Milan 1–0 in the group stages, and beat them again 1–0 on aggregate in the first knockout round. This was enough to attract interest from Milan club owner Silvio Berlusconi, who promptly appointed Sacchi as manager.

=== AC Milan ===
In Milan, Sacchi again faced problems of credibility. The press argued that such an inadequate player could never go on to be a successful coach, and that even Berlusconi – who had played football at amateur level – was probably a better player. Sacchi wittily replied, "I never realised that in order to become a jockey you have to have been a horse first." Sacchi was an instant success at the San Siro, leading Milan to its first Serie A title in nine years in his debut season, following up the league title with a Supercoppa Italiana in 1988.

Sacchi's success at Milan gained him two back-to-back European Cups. The success he gained was largely attributed to the Dutch trio he had purchased: Marco van Basten, Ruud Gullit and Frank Rijkaard. However, other great players such as Roberto Donadoni, as well as the defensive back four of Franco Baresi, Alessandro Costacurta, Mauro Tassotti and Paolo Maldini, were also key to his success.

The first European Cup final in 1989 was against Steaua București, who were beaten 4–0. Gullit and Van Basten scored two goals each and Milan lifted the European Cup for the first time in over 20 years. En route to the final, Milan had dispatched Real Madrid 6–1 on aggregate in the semi-final. The quarter-final against Werder Bremen was a tight affair; Milan only went through 1–0 on aggregate thanks to a Van Basten penalty. The second round was shrouded in controversy. Donadoni had his life saved only through the quick-thinking of the Red Star Belgrade physio, who broke his jaw to make a passage for oxygen to reach his lungs after he had suffered a bad foul and lay unconscious. The first leg ended in a 1–1 draw, and the second leg was called off in the 64th minute and rescheduled to be replayed the next day due to the thick fog (Milan was losing 0–1 at the moment). Milan eventually progressed following a penalty shoot-out.

Although the team was not as strong as they had been in the previous season, they were victorious again in 1990. After victories against HJK Helsinki, Real Madrid and KV Mechelen, Milan defeated German Bayern Munich in the semi-final, thanks to an away goal. In the final Frank Rijkaard scored the only goal of the game through a Van Basten assist to conquer Sven-Göran Eriksson's Benfica. By winning the final, Milan became the first team which retained the title since 1980, and the last team to do so until Real Madrid would manage to achieve this feat 27 years later. Sacchi would also capture back to back European Super Cups and Intercontinental Cups in 1989 and 1990, and would lead Milan to the final of the 1989–90 Coppa Italia, where they were defeated by Juventus. The following season saw them defeated by eventual runners-up Marseille in the quarter-final, and finish second in Serie A behind Sampdoria, while they were eliminated in the semi-finals of the Coppa Italia by eventual champions Roma. This was Sacchi's last season with i Rossoneri.

=== Italy national team ===
In November 1991, Sacchi was appointed manager of the Italy national team, replacing Azeglio Vicini. Sacchi based his Italian selection predominantly on Milan players, especially in the defensive line, which featured Paolo Maldini and Franco Baresi; the attacking line was led by 1993 Ballon d'Or winner Roberto Baggio of Juventus. Notable exclusions from Sacchi's Azzurri selections included Gianluca Vialli, Roberto Mancini, Giuseppe Bergomi (who had been part of the World Cup winning squad of 1982) and Walter Zenga.

Sacchi led Italy through the qualification campaign to reach the 1994 FIFA World Cup. Despite losing their first match 1–0 to the Republic of Ireland and finishing third in their group, Italy reached the final (their first since 1982), where they were defeated by Brazil in a penalty shoot-out, the first ever shootout in a World Cup final. Under Sacchi, Italy qualified for UEFA Euro 1996, but were eliminated in the group stage from a group which included the eventual finalists, Germany and the Czech Republic. Sacchi later commented that the Euro 96 side were his best Italy team.

=== Later coaching and executive career ===
After leaving his position with the national team, Sacchi returned to Milan to replace Óscar Tabárez in December 1996. However, the second spell was unsuccessful with Milan finishing 11th in the league and suffering its worst ever Serie A defeat, losing 6–1 at home to eventual champions Juventus.

Sacchi had brief spells in the Spanish La Liga, taking charge of Atlético Madrid in 1998 after his second spell with the Rossoneri, where he left his post in March of that season, with them languishing in the bottom half of the table. He also briefly returned to Parma in 2001, replacing Alberto Malesani, but resigned after only 3 matches (2 draws, 1 victory) for stress reasons, to be replaced by Renzo Ulivieri. He later returned to Madrid, this time at the Santiago Bernabéu Stadium as director of football at Real Madrid for the 2004–05 season.

== Management style, reception, and influence ==
Nicknamed "The Prophet of Fusignano", Sacchi is regarded as one of the greatest managers of all time. UEFA featured Sacchi among ten influential coaches in its Coaching greats in profile series, describing him as a "master of the Italian renaissance". UEFA credited him with transforming Italian football through his attacking philosophy, tactical innovations, and training methods, which influenced subsequent generations of coaches. He favored a fluid, yet highly organised attacking 4–4–2 formation, discarding the traditional libero in an era where Italian football was mainly focussed on strong defensive play, and Helenio Herrera's Catenaccio tactics were still a strong influence. Defensively, Sacchi's teams adopted a zonal marking system, which had already been introduced by his predecessor Nils Liedholm, and were known for their defensive strength, conceding few goals; indeed, the defensive quartet of Maldini, Baresi, Costacurta, and Tassotti, which Sacchi deployed both at Milan and with the Italy national team, is regarded as one of the greatest defences of all-time.

Sacchi believes in the Dutch concept of Total Football, insisting that young players should be coached in all aspects of football rather than into specialist positions, helping the team both with or without the ball. He is credited as an innovator, popularising high pressing from his teams, the offside trap, and a high defensive line with no more than 25 metres between defence and attack. This style of pressing has been emulated successfully by José Mourinho's Porto, Pep Guardiola's Barcelona, Jürgen Klopp's Borussia Dortmund and Jupp Heynckes's Bayern Munich. His successor at Milan, Fabio Capello, retained aspects of Sacchi's tactics and went on to win four Scudetti in five seasons and the 1993–94 Champions League. Spanish coach Rafael Benítez cites Sacchi as his role model and "the coach who has revolutionised football in the past 50 years".

Sacchi was a firm believer in team ethic, work ethic, discipline and treating all players as equals, once saying, "The only way you can build a side is by getting players who speak the same language and can play a team game. You can't achieve anything on your own, and if you do, it doesn't last long. I often quote what Michelangelo said: 'The spirit guides the hand.'" To perfect his team's cohesion, Sacchi introduced "shadow play", where his players would simulate a match in training without a football.

Sacchi also attracted controversy for implementing a strict and rigorous training regime for his players. Sacchi is also remembered for his outspokenness, stubbornness and his meticulous, obsessive attention to detail when preparing tactical solutions and perfecting plays, which his players were then expected to memorise and implement consistently during matches. Throughout his career, he clashed with several of his players, including Marco Van Basten, Gianluca Vialli, and Roberto Baggio, as well as manager Fabio Capello.

Sacchi has been frequently imitated in television by Italian comedian Maurizio Crozza.

== Career statistics ==
Managerial record by team and tenure
Team	From	To	Record							
Team	From	To	G	W	D	L	GF	GA	GD	Win %
Rimini	1982	1983	43	15	13	15	39	39	+0	34.88
Rimini	1984	1985	42	15	19	8	46	36	+10	35.71
Parma	June 1985	July 1987	88	34	38	16	80	46	+34	38.64
AC Milan	July 1987	June 1991	196	109	58	29	307	114	+193	55.61
Italy	November 1991	June 1996	53	34	11	8	90	35	+55	64.15
Milan	December 1996	June 1997	25	7	7	11	29	36	−7	28.00
Atlético Madrid	June 1998	February 1999	30	15	5	10	52	32	+20	50.00
Parma	January 2001	January 2001	3	1	2	0	4	2	+2	33.33
Total			480	230	153	97	647	340	+307	47.92

== Honours ==
Parma

- Serie C1: 1985–86

Milan

- Serie A: 1987–88
- Supercoppa Italiana: 1988
- European Cup: 1988–89, 1989–90
- European Super Cup: 1989, 1990
- Intercontinental Cup: 1989, 1990
- Coppa Italia runner-up: 1989–90

Italy

- FIFA World Cup runner-up: 1994

Individual

- Seminatore d'Oro: 1988, 1989
- World Soccer Awards Manager of the Year: 1989
- Greatest Manager of All Time – one of 5 managers ranked top 10 by France Football, World Soccer and ESPN
  - 3rd place (France Football): 2019
  - 6th place (World Soccer): 2013
  - 6th place (ESPN): 2013
  - 6th place (FourFourTwo): 2023
- Sports Illustrated Greatest Manager of All Time: 2nd place (2019)
- Italian Football Hall of Fame: 2011
- UEFA President's Award: 2022
