= 1987–88 UC Sampdoria season =

Sampdoria
1987–88 season
- Chairman: Paolo Mantovani
- Manager: Vujadin Boškov
- Stadium: Luigi Ferraris
- Serie A: 4th
- Coppa Italia: Winners
- Top goalscorer: League: Gianluca Vialli (10); All: Vialli (13)
Home colours	Away colours

UC Sampdoria won its second cup trophy in just three years, defeating Torino in the final, thanks to a 3–2 aggregate victory. Gianluca Vialli scored ten goals to become club top scorer, as Sampdoria finished fourth in the domestic league.

== Squad ==
Note: Flags indicate national team as defined under FIFA eligibility rules; some limited exceptions apply. Players may hold more than one non-FIFA nationality.

Pos.	Nation	Player
GK	ITA	Gianluca Pagliuca
GK	ITA	Guido Bistazzoni
DF	ITA	Moreno Mannini
DF	ITA	Pietro Vierchowod
DF	ITA	Luca Pellegrini
DF	ITA	Fausto Pari
DF	ITA	Antonio Paganin
DF	ITA	Michele Zanutta
DF	FRG	Hans-Peter Briegel

Pos.	Nation	Player
MF	ITA	Marco Lanna
MF	BRA	Toninho Cerezo
MF	ITA	Luca Fusi
MF	ITA	Fausto Salsano
MF	ITA	Fulvio Bonomi
FW	ITA	Roberto Mancini
FW	ITA	Gianluca Vialli
FW	ITA	Marco Branca

=== Transfers ===
In
Pos.	Name	from	Type
FW	Marco Branca	Udinese	
MF	Fulvio Bonomi	Ascoli	
DF	Marco Lanna		
MF	Roberto Breda		
FW	Enrico Chiesa		

Out
Pos.	Name	to	Type
DF	Enzo Gambaro	Parma	
FW	Giuseppe Lorenzo	Cesena	loan
GK	Roberto Bocchino	Casale FBC	loan

== Competitions ==
=== Serie A ===
==== League table ====
Pos	Team	Pld	W	D	L	GF	GA	GD	Pts	Qualification or relegation
2	Napoli	30	18	6	6	55	27	+28	42	Qualification to UEFA Cup
3	Roma	30	15	8	7	39	26	+13	38	Qualification to UEFA Cup
4	Sampdoria	30	13	11	6	41	30	+11	37	Qualification to Cup Winners' Cup
5	Internazionale	30	11	10	9	42	35	+7	32	Qualification to UEFA Cup
6	Juventus (Note: Juventus won the UEFA Cup qualification match against Torino 0–0*(4:2) then qualified to 1988–89 UEFA Cup.)	30	11	9	10	35	30	+5	31	Qualification to UEFA Cup

Source: 1987–88 Serie A, RSSSF.com
Rules for classification: 1) Points; 2) Head-to-head points; 3) Head-to-head goal difference; 4) Goal difference; 5) Goals scored; 6) Draw.

==== Results summary ====
Overall								Home						Away					
Pld	W	D	L	GF	GA	GD	Pts	W	D	L	GF	GA	GD	W	D	L	GF	GA	GD
30	13	11	6	41	30	+11	50	8	6	1	24	9	+15	5	5	5	17	21	−4

Source: Worldfootball

==== Results by round ====
Round	1	2	3	4	5	6	7	8	9	10	11	12	13	14	15	16	17	18	19	20	21	22	23	24	25	26	27	28	29	30
Ground	H	A	H	A	H	A	H	A	A	H	H	A	H	A	H	A	H	A	H	A	H	A	H	H	A	A	H	A	H	A
Result	W	L	W	W	D	D	W	W	D	D	W	D	D	W	L	D	D	L	W	L	W	L	W	W	W	D	D	L	D	W
Position	1	6	3	3	2	2	2	2	2	2	2	2	2	2	3	4	4	4	4	4	4	4	4	4	4	3	3	4	4	4

Source: Competitive matches
A = Away; H = Home; W = Win; D = Draw; L = Loss; = 1988–89 European Cup; = 1988–89 UEFA Cup

==== Matches ====
13 September 1987 1	Sampdoria	2–0	Empoli	Genoa
	Mancini 42'; Cerezo 58'	Report		Stadium: Stadio Luigi Ferraris; Referee: Angelo Amendolia

20 September 1987 2	Torino	4–1	Sampdoria	Turin
	Polster 6', 46', 82'; Rossi 36'	Report	Vialli 87'	Stadium: Stadio Comunale; Referee: Fabio Baldas

27 September 1987 3	Sampdoria	3–1	Hellas Verona	Genoa
	Briegel 13'; Mancini 63'; Vierchowod 84'	Report	Elkjær 43'	Stadium: Stadio Luigi Ferraris; Referee: Paolo Fabricatore

4 October 1987 4	Como	0–1	Sampdoria	Como
		Report	Bonomi 41' (pen.)	Stadium: Stadio Giuseppe Sinigaglia; Referee: Arcangelo Pezzella

11 October 1987 5	Sampdoria	1–1	Milan	Genoa
	Vialli 53'	Report	Gullit 51'	Stadium: Stadio Luigi Ferraris; Referee: Tullio Lanese

25 October 1987 6	Pescara	0–0	Sampdoria	Pescara
		Report		Stadium: Stadio Adriatico; Referee: Paolo Casarin

1 November 1987 7	Sampdoria	4–1	Cesena	Genoa
	Salsano 10'; Vierchowod 20'; Mancini 53' (pen.), 87 '	Report	Rizzitelli 70'	Stadium: Stadio Luigi Ferraris; Referee: Bruno Di Cola

8 November 1987 8	Avellino	1–2	Sampdoria	Avellino
	Schachner 45'	Report	Colomba 15' (o.g.); Briegel 44'	Stadium: Stadio Partenio; Referee: Pierluigi Magni

22 November 1987 9	Fiorentina	1–1	Sampdoria	Florence
	Paganin 33' (o.g.)	Report	Cerezo 37'	Stadium: Stadio Comunale; Referee: Pietro D'Elia

29 November 1987 10	Sampdoria	0–0	Roma	Genoa
		Report		Stadium: Stadio Luigi Ferraris; Referee: Luigi Agnolin

13 December 1987 11	Sampdoria	2–0	Ascoli	Genoa
	Vialli 37'; Salsano 64'	Report		Stadium: Luigi Ferraris; Referee: Carlo Sguizzato

20 December 1987 12	Juventus	1–1	Sampdoria	Turin
	Cabrini 6'	Report	Vierchowod 52'	Stadium: Stadio Comunale; Referee: Paolo Casarin

3 January 1988 13	Sampdoria	1–1	Internazionale	Genoa
	Mancini 58'	Report	Ferri 8'	Stadium: Stadio Luigi Ferraris; Referee: Fabio Baldas

10 January 1988 14	Pisa	0–1	Sampdoria	Pisa
		Report	Pellegrini 33'	Stadium: Arena Garibaldi; Referee: Pierluigi Magni

17 January 1988 15	Sampdoria	0–1	Napoli	Genoa
		Report	Maradona 87'	Stadium: Stadio Luigi Ferraris; Referee: Tullio Lanese

24 January 1988 16	Empoli	2–2	Sampdoria	Empoli
	Cucchi 14 ' Ekström 43'	Report	Vialli 55', 58'	Stadium: Stadio Carlo Castellani; Referee: Pietro D'Elia

31 January 1988 17	Sampdoria	1–1	Torino	Genoa
	Mannini 33'	Report	Comi 44'	Stadium: Stadio Luigi Ferraris; Referee: Salvatore Lombardo

7 February 1988 18	Hellas Verona	3–1	Sampdoria	Verona
	Pacione 51'; Volpecina 76'; Berthold 86'	Report	Vialli 31'	Stadium: Stadio Marcantonio Bentegodi; Referee: Arcangelo Pezzella

14 February 1988 19	Sampdoria	3–0	Como	Genoa
	Vierchowod 21'; Briegel 55'; Vialli 78'	Report		Stadium: Stadio Luigi Ferraris; Referee: Luciano Luci

28 February 1988 20	Milan	2–1	Sampdoria	Milan
	Virdis 7'; Maldini 70'	Report	Bonomi 16' (pen.)	Stadium: San Siro; Referee: Luigi Agnolin

6 March 1988 21	Sampdoria	2–1	Pescara	Genoa
	Cerezo 21'; Pari 70'	Report	Gasperini 15'	Stadium: Stadio Luigi Ferraris; Referee: Mauro Felicani

13 March 1988 22	Cesena	2–0	Sampdoria	Cesena
	Bianchi 15', 40'	Report		Stadium: Stadio La Fiorita; Referee: Pierluigi Magni

20 March 1988 23	Sampdoria	2–0	Avellino	Genoa
	Salsano 63'; Vierchowod 68'	Report		Stadium: Stadio Luigi Ferraris; Referee: Romeo Paparesta

27 March 1988 24	Sampdoria	1–0	Fiorentina	Genoa
	Bonomi 57' (pen.)	Report		Stadium: Stadio Luigi Ferraris; Referee: Carlo Sguizzato

10 April 1988 25	Roma	0–2	Sampdoria	Rome
		Report	Vialli 67'; Bonomi 76' (pen.)	Stadium: Stadio Olimpico; Referee: Pietro D'Elia

17 April 1988 26	Ascoli	1–1	Sampdoria	Ascoli Piceno
	Scarafoni 59'	Report	Branca 87'	Stadium: Stadio Cino e Lillo Del Duca; Referee: Pierluigi Magni

24 April 1988 27	Sampdoria	2–2	Juventus	Genoa
	Bonomi 28' (pen.); Vialli 40'	Report	Buso 44'; Scirea 90'	Stadium: Stadio Luigi Ferraris; Referee: Arcangelo Pezzella

1 May 1988 28	Internazionale	3–1	Sampdoria	Milan
	Mandorlini 32'; Scifo 60'; Altobelli 79'	Report	Mannini 85'	Stadium: San Siro; Referee: Sergio Coppetelli

8 May 1988 29	Sampdoria	0–0	Pisa	Genoa
		Report		Stadium: Stadio Luigi Ferraris; Referee: Luigi Agnolin

15 May 1988 30	Napoli	1–2	Sampdoria	Naples
	Carnevale 7'	Report	Pellegrini 59'; Vialli 87'	Stadium: Stadio San Paolo; Referee: Carlo Sguizzato

=== Coppa Italia ===
==== Group stage (Group 7) ====
Pos	Team	Pld	W	PKW	PKL	L	GF	GA	GD	Pts
1	Sampdoria	5	5	0	0	0	10	1	+9	15
2	Torino	5	4	0	0	1	9	4	+5	12
3	Atalanta	5	2	0	1	2	6	6	0	7
4	Vicenza	5	1	0	1	3	4	7	−3	4
5	Cosenza	5	0	2	0	3	3	7	−4	4
6	Arezzo	5	0	1	1	3	2	9	−7	3

23 August 1987 1	Arezzo	0–2	Sampdoria	Arezzo
20:30 CEST			Cerezo 5'; Briegel 18'	Stadium: Stadio Comunale; Referee: Carlo Sguizzato

26 August 1987 2	Sampdoria	2–0	Cosenza	Alessandria
20:30 CEST	Castagnini 4' (o.g.); Cerezo 48'			Stadium: Stadio Giuseppe Moccagatta; Referee: Salvatore Tarallo

30 August 1987 3	Vicenza	1–2	Sampdoria	Vicenza
20:30 CEST	Bertozzi 56'		Bonomi 47'; Cerezo 53'	Stadium: Stadio Romeo Menti; Attendance: 11,000; Referee: Werter Cornieti

2 September 1987 4	Sampdoria	2–0	Atalanta	Alessandria
20:30 CEST	Pari 56'; Progna 58' (o.g.)			Stadium: Stadio Giuseppe Moccagatta; Referee: Romeo Paparesta

6 September 1987 5	Torino	0–2	Sampdoria	Turin
20:30 CEST			Vialli 60', 89' (pen.)	Stadium: Stadio Comunale; Attendance: 20,245; Referee: Luigi Agnolin

==== Round of 16 ====
6 January 1988 First leg	Pisa	2–1	Sampdoria	Pisa
15:00 CET	Paciocco 43'; Caneo 87'	Report	Vierchowod 4'	Stadium: Stadio Arena Garibaldi; Attendance: 8,379; Referee: Arcangelo Pezzella

20 January 1988 Second leg	Sampdoria	2–0 (3–2 agg.)	Pisa	Genoa
14:30 CET	Bonomi 34', 44' (pen.)	Report		Stadium: Stadio Luigi Ferraris; Attendance: 12,028; Referee: Luigi Agnolin

==== Quarter-finals ====
10 February 1988 First leg	Sampdoria	4–2	Ascoli	Genoa
15:00 CET	Vierchowod 8'; Branca 19'; R. Mancini 29', 34'		Destro 25'; Carillo 45'	Stadium: Stadio Luigi Ferraris; Referee: Bruno Di Cola

2 March 1988 Second leg	Ascoli	1–1 (3–5 agg.)	Sampdoria	Ascoli Piceno
15:00 CET	Scarafoni 60'		Briegel 23'	Stadium: Stadio Cino e Lillo Del Duca; Attendance: 8,379; Referee: Arcangelo Pezzella

==== Semi-finals ====
6 April 1988 First leg	Internazionale	0–0	Sampdoria	Milan
20:30 CEST				Stadium: San Siro; Referee: Rosario Lo Bello

20 April 1988 Second leg	Sampdoria	1–0 (1–0 agg.)	Internazionale	Genoa
20:30 CEST	R. Mancini 25'			Stadium: Stadio Luigi Ferraris; Referee: Luigi Agnolin

==== Final ====
5 May 1988 First leg	Sampdoria	2–0	Torino	Genoa
21:00 CEST	Briegel 10'; Vialli 33'			Stadium: Stadio Luigi Ferraris; Attendance: 18,000; Referee: Paolo Casarin

19 May 1988 Second leg	Torino	2–1 (a.e.t.) (2–3 agg.)	Sampdoria	Turin
21:00 CEST	Vierchowod 5' (o.g.); A. Paganin 35' (o.g.)		Salsano 112'	Stadium: Stadio Comunale; Attendance: 33,000; Referee: Luigi Agnolin

== Statistics ==
=== Players statistics ===
No.	Pos	Nat	Player	Total		1987–88 Serie A		1987–88 Coppa Italia	
No.	Pos	Nat	Player	Apps	Goals	Apps	Goals	Apps	Goals
	GK	(Italy) ITA	Guido Bistazzoni	36	-33	28	-29	8	-4
	DF	(Italy) ITA	Moreno Mannini	42	2	29	2	13	0
	DF	(Italy) ITA	Pietro Vierchowod	40	7	29	5	11	2
	DF	(Italy) ITA	Luca Pellegrini	41	2	28	2	13	0
	DF	(West Germany) FRG	Hans-Peter Briegel	39	6	27	3	12	3
	MF	(Italy) ITA	Fausto Pari	42	2	30	1	12	1
	MF	(Brazil) BRA	Toninho Cerezo	41	6	28	3	13	3
	MF	(Italy) ITA	Luca Fusi	43	0	30	0	13	0
	MF	(Italy) ITA	Fulvio Bonomi	42	8	23+6	5	13	3
	FW	(Italy) ITA	Roberto Mancini	43	8	30	5	13	3
	FW	(Italy) ITA	Gianluca Vialli	43	13	30	10	13	3
	GK	(Italy) ITA	Gianluca Pagliuca	7	-5	2	-1	5	-4
	MF	(Italy) ITA	Fausto Salsano	41	4	12+16	3	13	1
	DF	(Italy) ITA	Antonio Paganin	17	0	3+9	0	5	0
	MF	(Italy) ITA	Marco Lanna	1	0	1	0		
	FW	(Italy) ITA	Marco Branca	18	2	0+9	1	9	1
	FW	(Italy) ITA	Maurizio Ganz	3	0	0+1	0	2	0
	DF	(Italy) ITA	Michele Zanutta	1	0	0	0	1	0
	MF	(Italy) ITA	Roberto Breda						
	FW	(Italy) ITA	Enrico Chiesa						

- Source: http://calcio-seriea.net/formazioni/1987/960/
