= 1986–87 UC Sampdoria season =

Sampdoria
1986–87 season
- Owner: Paolo Mantovani
- Chairman: Paolo Mantovani
- Manager: Vujadin Boškov
- Stadium: Luigi Ferraris
- Serie A: 6th
- Coppa Italia: First round
- Top goalscorer: Gianluca Vialli (12)
Home colours	Away colours

UC Sampdoria started its march towards an eventual Serie A championship and European Cup final with its appointment of Yugoslav coach Vujadin Boškov. With Britons Graeme Souness and Trevor Francis leaving the squad, Boškov built his team around young Italian players, with Roberto Mancini, Gianluca Vialli, Pietro Vierchowod and Moreno Mannini among the bulwark of the squad as Sampdoria finished 6th in a tight battle involving several teams for 3rd in the championship.

== Squad ==
Note: Flags indicate national team as defined under FIFA eligibility rules; some limited exceptions apply. Players may hold more than one non-FIFA nationality.

Pos.	Nation	Player
GK	ITA	Guido Bistazzoni
GK	ITA	Roberto Bocchino
GK	ITA	Gianluca Pagliuca
DF	ITA	Moreno Mannini
DF	ITA	Pietro Vierchowod
DF	ITA	Luca Pellegrini
DF	ITA	Antonio Paganin
DF	ITA	Enzo Gambaro
DF	ITA	Michele Zanutta

Pos.	Nation	Player
DF	FRG	Hans-Peter Briegel
MF	ITA	Fausto Pari
MF	BRA	Toninho Cerezo
MF	ITA	Luca Fusi
MF	ITA	Fausto Salsano
FW	ITA	Gianluca Vialli
FW	ITA	Roberto Mancini
FW	ITA	Giuseppe Lorenzo
FW	ITA	Maurizio Ganz

=== Transfers ===
In
Pos.	Name	from	Type
MF	Toninho Cerezo	AS Roma	
DF	Hans-Peter Briegel	Hellas Verona	
MF	Luca Fusi	Como	
GK	Guido Bistazzoni	Triestina	
DF	Enzo Gambaro	AC Prato	

Out
Pos.	Name	to	Type
MF	Graeme Souness	Glasgow Rangers	
FW	Trevor Francis	Glasgow Rangers	
MF	Gianfranco Matteoli	Internazionale	
GK	Ivano Bordon		
DF	Roberto Galia		
MF	Alessandro Scanziani		
FW	Fabio Aselli		
DF	Andrea Veronici		
MF	Fiondella		

== Competitions ==
=== Serie A ===
==== League table ====
Pos	Team	Pld	W	D	L	GF	GA	GD	Pts	Qualification or relegation
4	Hellas Verona	30	12	12	6	36	25	+11	36	Qualification to UEFA Cup
5	Milan (Note: Milan won the UEFA Cup qualification match against Sampdoria 1–0 then qualified to 1987–88 UEFA Cup.)	30	13	9	8	31	21	+10	35	Qualification to UEFA Cup
6	Sampdoria	30	13	9	8	37	21	+16	35	
7	Roma	30	12	9	9	37	31	+6	33	
8	Avellino	30	9	12	9	31	38	−7	30	

Source: 1986–87 Serie A, RSSSF.com
Rules for classification: 1) Points; 2) Head-to-head points; 3) Head-to-head goal difference; 4) Goal difference; 5) Goals scored; 6) Draw. (Note: Head-to-head record is used only after all the matches between the teams in question have been played).

==== Results summary ====
Overall								Home						Away					
Pld	W	D	L	GF	GA	GD	Pts	W	D	L	GF	GA	GD	W	D	L	GF	GA	GD
30	13	9	8	37	21	+16	48	9	4	2	26	8	+18	4	5	6	11	13	−2

Source: Worldfootball

==== Position by round ====
Round	1	2	3	4	5	6	7	8	9	10	11	12	13	14	15	16	17	18	19	20	21	22	23	24	25	26	27	28	29	30	31	32
Ground	H	A	H	A	H	A	H	A	H	H	A	H	A	H	H	A	A	H	A	H	A	H	A	H	A	H	A	H	A	A	H	N
Result	W	L	L	D	L	L	W	W	-	W	D	W	L	W	D	L	L	W	D	D	D	W	D	W	W	D	W	D	L	W	W	L
Position	1	6	12	10	13	14	11	10	10	8	8	8	8	7	7	7	8	7	7	7	7	7	7	6	6	7	7	6	7	6	5	6

Source: Competitive matches
A = Away; H = Home; W = Win; D = Draw; L = Loss; = 1987–88 European Cup; = 1987–88 UEFA Cup; = 1987–88 Serie B

==== Matches ====
14 September 1986 1	Sampdoria	1–0	Atalanta	Genoa
	Cesare Prandelli 41' (o.g.)	Report		Stadium: Stadio Luigi Ferraris; Attendance: 25,091; Referee: Giancarlo Redini

21 September 1986 2	Fiorentina	2–0	Sampdoria	Florence
	Díaz 73', 85'	Report		Stadium: Stadio Comunale; Referee: Paolo Casarin

28 September 1986 3	Sampdoria	0–1	Como	Genoa
		Report	Todesco 50'	Stadium: Stadio Luigi Ferraris; Attendance: 21,828; Referee: Alberto Boschi

5 October 1986 4	Hellas Verona	1–1	Sampdoria	Verona
	Galia 31'	Report	Vialli 19' (pen.)	Stadium: Stadio Marc'Antonio Bentegodi; Referee: Pietro D'Elia

12 October 1986 5	Sampdoria	1–2	Napoli	Genoa
	Vialli 59' (pen.)	Report	Caffarelli 8'; Maradona 65' (pen.)	Stadium: Stadio Luigi Ferraris; Attendance: 32,965; Referee: Rosario Lo Bello

19 October 1986 6	Internazionale	1–0	Sampdoria	Milan
	Passarella 66' (pen.)	Report		Stadium: San Siro; Referee: Carlo Longhi

26 October 1986 7	Sampdoria	3–0	Empoli	Genoa
	Mancini 10'; Salsano 39'; Vialli 64'	Report		Stadium: Luigi Ferraris; Attendance: 18,994; Referee: Pierluigi Magni

2 November 1986 8	Brescia	0–1	Sampdoria	Brescia
		Report	Argentesi 43' (o.g.)	Stadium: Stadio Mario Rigamonti; Referee: Luciano Luci

9 November 1986 9	Sampdoria	abd.	Milan	Genoa
	Vialli (penalty missed) 7'; Briegel 33'	Report	Virdis 31'	Stadium: Stadio Luigi Ferraris; Referee: Pietro D'Elia
Note: Giovanni Galli blocked a penalty shoot-out by Vialli at 7'.Match suspended at 39’ due to referee issues.

20 November 1986 9	Sampdoria	3–0	Milan	Genoa
	Paganin 10'; Briegel 60'; Briegel 77'	Report		Stadium: Stadio Luigi Ferraris; Attendance: 37,667; Referee: Paolo Bergamo
Note: Match rescheduled from 9 November 1986.

23 November 1986 10	Udinese	0–0	Sampdoria	Udine
		Report		Stadium: Stadio Friuli; Referee: Romeo Paparesta

30 November 1986 11	Sampdoria	1–0	Ascoli	Genova
	Cerezo 88'	Report		Stadium: Stadio Luigi Ferraris; Attendance: 22,544; Referee: Luciano Luci

14 December 1986 12	Avellino	3–1	Sampdoria	Avellino
	Dirceu 4'; Alessio 49'; Tovalieri 58'	Report	Vierchowod 57'	Stadium: Stadio Partenio; Referee: Maurizio Mattei

21 December 1986 13	Sampdoria	4–1	Juventus	Genoa
	Vialli 63', 87'; Mancini 70'; Briegel 80'	Report	Serena 71'	Stadium: Stadio Luigi Ferraris; Attendance: 37,614; Referee: Bergamo

4 January 1987 14	Sampdoria	0–0	Roma	Genoa
		Report		Stadium: Stadio Luigi Ferraris; Attendance: 31,543; Referee: Paolo Casarin

11 January 1987 15	Torino	2–0	Sampdoria	Turin
	Comi 14' (pen.); Corradini 19'	Report		Stadium: Stadio Comunale; Referee: Salvatore Lombardo

18 January 1987 16	Atalanta	1–0	Sampdoria	Bergamo
	Magrin 35' (pen.)	Report		Stadium: Stadio Atleti Azzurri d'Italia; Referee: Alberto Boschi

1 February 1987 17	Sampdoria	3–1	Fiorentina	Genoa
	Mancini 44'; Briegel 65'; Vialli 85'	Report	Monelli 38'	Stadium: Stadio Luigi Ferraris; Attendance: 23,130; Referee: Luigi Agnolin

1 February 1987 18	Como	0–0	Sampdoria	Como
		Report		Stadium: Stadio Giuseppe Sinigaglia; Referee: Tullio Lanese

22 February 1987 19	Sampdoria	0–0	Hellas Verona	Genoa
		Report		Stadium: Stadio Luigi Ferraris; Attendance: 18,221; Referee: Baldas

1 March 1987 20	Napoli	1–1	Sampdoria	Naples
	Maradona 37'	Report	Lorenzo 31'	Stadium: Stadio San Paolo; Referee: Luigi Agnolin

8 March 1987 21	Sampdoria	3–1	Internazionale	Genoa
	Briegel 10'; Mancini 76'; Lorenzo 90' (pen.)	Report	Garlini 57'	Stadium: Stadio Luigi Ferraris; Attendance: 32,365; Referee: Maurizio Mattei

15 March 1987 22	Empoli	0–0	Sampdoria	Empoli
		Report		Stadium: Stadio Carlo Castellani; Referee: Fabio Baldas

22 March 1987 23	Sampdoria	2–0	Brescia	Genoa
	Vialli 65'; Mancini 80' (pen.)	Report		Stadium: Stadio Luigi Ferraris; Attendance: 20,220; Referee: Paolo Bergamo

29 March 1987 24	Milan	0–2	Sampdoria	Milan
		Report	Vialli 36'; Cerezo 82'	Stadium: San Siro; Referee: Luciano Luci

5 April 1987 25	Sampdoria	0–0	Udinese	Genoa
		Report		Stadium: Stadio Luigi Ferraris; Attendance: 20,569; Referee: Moreno Frigerio

12 April 1987 26	Ascoli	0–1	Sampdoria	Ascoli Piceno
		Report	Cerezo 46'	Stadium: Stadio Cino e Lillo Del Duca; Referee: Arcangelo Pezzella

26 April 1987 27	Sampdoria	2–2	Avellino	Genoa
	Mancini 25'pen Lorenzo 52'	Report	Bertoni 61'; Alessio 77'	Stadium: Stadio Luigi Ferraris; Attendance: 24,009; Referee: Angelo Amendolia

3 May 1987 28	Juventus	2–1	Sampdoria	Turin
	Manfredonia 49'; Serena 56'	Report	Vialli 73'	Stadium: Stadio Comunale; Referee: Pietro D'Elia

10 May 1987 29	Roma	0–3	Sampdoria	Rome
		Report	Vierchowod 22'; Vialli 44', 51'	Stadium: Stadio Olimpico; Referee: Pierluigi Magni

17 May 1987 30	Sampdoria	3–0	Torino	Genoa
	Vialli 39'; Briegel 74'; Mannini 87'	Report		Stadium: Stadio Luigi Ferraris; Attendance: 23,784; Referee: Luciano Luci

==== UEFA Cup qualification ====
23 May 1987	Milan	1–0 (a.e.t.)	Sampdoria	Turin
	Massaro 102'			Stadium: Stadio Comunale; Attendance: 32,245; Referee: Tullio Lanese

Milan qualified for 1987-88 UEFA Cup.

=== Coppa Italia ===
==== Group stage (Group 3) ====
Pos	Team	Pld	W	D	L	GF	GA	GD	Pts
1	Juventus	5	4	0	1	10	3	+7	8
2	Cremonese	5	3	1	1	8	2	+6	7
3	Sampdoria	5	3	1	1	5	3	+2	7
4	Lecce	5	1	1	3	3	5	−2	3
5	Monza	5	1	1	3	2	7	−5	3
6	Reggiana	5	0	2	3	2	10	−8	2

24 August 1986 1	Cremonese	0–0	Sampdoria	Cremona
20:30 CEST				Stadium: Stadio Giovanni Zini; Attendance: 7,000; Referee: Giorgio Baldi

27 August 1986 2	Reggiana	0–2	Sampdoria	Reggio Emilia
20:45 CEST			Vialli 31' (pen.), 68'	Stadium: Stadio Mirabello; Referee: Gennaro Testa

31 August 1986 3	Sampdoria	1–0	Lecce	Genoa
20:30 CEST	Vialli 4' (pen.)			Stadium: Stadio Luigi Ferraris; Attendance: 10,000; Referee: Rosario Lo Bello

3 September 1986 4	Monza	2–0	Sampdoria	Monza
20:45 CEST	Casiraghi 8', 17'			Stadium: Stadio Gino Alfonso Sada; Referee: Salvatore Lombardo

7 September 1986 5	Sampdoria	2–1	Juventus	Genoa
20:30 CEST	Vialli 1'; Mannini 21'		Scirea 41'	Stadium: Stadio Luigi Ferraris; Attendance: c. 22,000; Referee: Arcangelo Pezzella

== Statistics ==
=== Players statistics ===
No.	Pos	Nat	Player	Total		Serie A		Spareggio	
No.	Pos	Nat	Player	Apps	Goals	Apps	Goals	Apps	Goals
	GK	(Italy) ITA	Guido Bistazzoni	31	-22	30	-21	1	-1
	DF	(Italy) ITA	Moreno Mannini	29	1	27+1	1	1	0
	DF	(Italy) ITA	Pietro Vierchowod	29	2	28	2	1	0
	DF	(Italy) ITA	Luca Pellegrini	31	0	30	0	1	0
	DF	(West Germany) FRG	Hans-Peter Briegel	25	6	24	6	1	0
	MF	(Italy) ITA	Fausto Pari	28	0	27	0	1	0
	MF	(Brazil) BRA	Toninho Cerezo	29	3	28	3	1	0
	MF	(Italy) ITA	Luca Fusi	31	0	30	0	1	0
	MF	(Italy) ITA	Fausto Salsano	30	1	29	1	1	0
	FW	(Italy) ITA	Gianluca Vialli	29	12	28	12	1	0
	FW	(Italy) ITA	Roberto Mancini	27	6	26	6	1	0
	GK	(Italy) ITA	Roberto Bocchino	1	0	0+1	-0	0	0
	DF	(Italy) ITA	Antonio Paganin	18	1	12+5	1	1	0
	FW	(Italy) ITA	Giuseppe Lorenzo	20	3	9+10	3	1	0
	DF	(Italy) ITA	Enzo Gambaro	16	0	2+14	0		
	FW	(Italy) ITA	Maurizio Ganz	12	0	0+12	0		
	DF	(Italy) ITA	Michele Zanutta	1	0	0+1	0		
	GK	(Italy) ITA	Gianluca Pagliuca	0	0	0	0		

- Source: http://calcio-seriea.net/presenze/1986/940/

== Sources ==
- RSSSF - Italy 1986/87
