= 1984–85 UC Sampdoria season =

Sampdoria
1984–85 season
- President: Paolo Mantovani
- Manager: Eugenio Bersellini
- Stadium: Luigi Ferraris
- Serie A: 4th
- Coppa Italia: Winners (In 1985–86 UEFA Cup Winners' Cup)
- Top goalscorer: League: Trevor Francis; Fausto Salsano (6 each); All: Trevor Francis (15 goals)
Home colours	Away colours

UC Sampdoria recorded its best league season since 1960–61, thanks to a fourth place-finish. President Mantovani had surprised the football world by signing Liverpool stalwart Graeme Souness to the squad, and it paid off, with Souness adapting quickly to Italian football, also helping the team to win the 1985 edition of Coppa Italia, which was the first ever title for the club. The defensive line, with Moreno Mannini, Pietro Vierchowod and Antonio Paganin among the crew, was the main reason for the success, Sampdoria conceding just 23 goals in 30 league matches played. Quite a few of the players were still with the club when it finally won the league title in 1991.

== Squad ==
Note: Flags indicate national team as defined under FIFA eligibility rules; some limited exceptions apply. Players may hold more than one non-FIFA nationality.

Pos.	Nation	Player
GK	ITA	Ivano Bordon
GK	ITA	Roberto Bocchino
DF	ITA	Moreno Mannini
DF	ITA	Pietro Vierchowod
DF	ITA	Luca Pellegrini
DF	ITA	Alessandro Renica
DF	ITA	Roberto Galia
DF	ITA	Antonio Paganin
DF	ITA	Enzo Gambaro
MF	ITA	Fausto Pari

Pos.	Nation	Player
MF	SCO	Graeme Souness
MF	ITA	Alessandro Scanziani
MF	ITA	Fausto Salsano
MF	ITA	Evaristo Beccalossi
MF	ITA	Francesco Casagrande
MF	ITA	Giovanni Picasso
FW	ENG	Trevor Francis
FW	ITA	Roberto Mancini
FW	ITA	Gianluca Vialli

=== Transfers ===
In
Pos.	Name	from	Type
MF	Graeme Souness	Liverpool	
FW	Gianluca Vialli	Cremonese	
MF	Fausto Salsano	Parma	loan ended
DF	Moreno Mannini	Como	
DF	Antonio Paganin	Bologna	
MF	Evaristo Beccalossi	Internazionale	

Out
Pos.	Name	to	Type
MF	Liam Brady	Internazionale	
FW	Domenico Marocchino	Bologna FC	
FW	Nicola Zanone	Perugia	
DF	Giovanni Guerrini	Como	
MF	Gianfranco Belloto		end of contract
FW	Alviero Chiorri	Cremonese	
GK	Mauro Rosin	Perugia	

== Competitions ==
=== Serie A ===
==== League table ====
Pos	Team	Pld	W	D	L	GF	GA	GD	Pts	Qualification or relegation
2	Torino	30	14	11	5	36	22	+14	39	Qualification to UEFA Cup
3	Internazionale	30	13	12	5	42	28	+14	38	Qualification to UEFA Cup
4	Sampdoria	30	12	13	5	36	21	+15	37	Qualification to Cup Winners' Cup
5	Milan	30	12	12	6	31	25	+6	36 (Note: Position defined by head-to-head points: Milan: 3 pts; Juventus: 1 pt.)	Qualification to UEFA Cup
6	Juventus (Note: Juventus gained entry to the 1985–86 European Cup as defending champions.)	30	11	14	5	48	33	+15	36	Qualification to European Cup

Source: RSSSF.com
Rules for classification: 1) Points; 2) Head-to-head points; 3) Head-to-head goal difference; 4) Goal difference; 5) Goals scored; 6) Draw. (Note: Head-to-head record is used only after all the matches between the teams in question have been played).

==== Results summary ====
Overall								Home						Away					
Pld	W	D	L	GF	GA	GD	Pts	W	D	L	GF	GA	GD	W	D	L	GF	GA	GD
30	12	13	5	36	21	+15	49	9	5	1	23	9	+14	3	8	4	13	12	+1

Source: Worldfootball

==== Results by round ====
Round	1	2	3	4	5	6	7	8	9	10	11	12	13	14	15	16	17	18	19	20	21	22	23	24	25	26	27	28	29	30
Ground	H	A	H	A	H	A	H	H	A	A	H	H	A	H	A	A	H	A	H	A	H	A	A	H	H	A	A	H	A	H
Result	W	D	W	D	W	L	D	W	D	W	D	W	L	D	D	D	D	L	W	W	W	D	D	D	W	W	L	L	D	W
Position	1	2	2	2	2	3	4	3	3	2	3	3	4	4	4	5	5	6	4	4	3	3	4	2	2	2	3	4	4	4

Source: http://calcio-seriea.net/allenatori_squadra/1984/908/
A = Away; H = Home; W = Win; D = Draw; L = Loss; = 1985–86 European Cup; = 1985–86 UEFA Cup Following UEFA ranking changes and the English ban, Italy gained a third berth.

==== Matches ====
16 September 1984 1	Sampdoria	1–0	Cremonese	Genoa
	Souness 37'	Report		Stadium: Stadio Luigi Ferraris; Attendance: 27,988; Referee: Roberto Bianciardi

23 September 1984 2	Napoli	1–1	Sampdoria	Naples
	Maradona 62' (pen.)	Report	Salsano 72'	Stadium: Stadio San Paolo; Referee: Romeo Paparesta

30 September 1984 3	Sampdoria	2–0	Ascoli	Genoa
	Scanziani 21'; Bogoni 90' (o.g.)	Report		Stadium: Stadio Luigi Ferraris; Attendance: 24,296; Referee: Tullio Lanese

7 October 1984 4	Roma	1–1	Sampdoria	Rome
	Pruzzo 14' (pen.)	Report	Souness 16' (pen.)	Stadium: Stadio Olimpico; Referee: Roberto Bianciardi

14 October 1984 5	Sampdoria	2–0	Fiorentina	Genoa
	Renica 52'; Passarella 67' (o.g.)	Report		Stadium: Stadio Luigi Ferraris; Attendance: 38,792; Referee: Pierluigi Magni

21 October 1984 6	Udinese	1–0	Sampdoria	Udine
	Edinho 33'	Report		Stadium: Stadio Friuli; Referee: Tullio Lanese

28 October 1984 7	Sampdoria	2–2	Torino	Genoa
	Souness 20'; Francis 90'	Report	Galbiati 13'; Júnior 28'	Stadium: Stadio Luigi Ferraris; Attendance: 35,631; Referee: Romeo Paparesta

11 November 1984 8	Sampdoria	1–0	Como	Genoa
	Mancini 7'	Report		Stadium: Stadio Luigi Ferraris; Attendance: 26,256; Referee: Roberto Bianciardi

18 November 1984 9	Verona	0–0	Sampdoria	Verona
		Report		Stadium: Stadio Marcantonio Bentegodi; Referee: Pietro D'Elia

25 November 1984 10	Milan	0–1	Sampdoria	Milan
		Report	Francis 64' (pen.)	Stadium: San Siro; Referee: Romeo Paparesta

2 December 1984 11	Sampdoria	2–2	Lazio	Genoa
	Mancini 3'; Salsano 19'	Report	Calisti 78'; Batista 83'	Stadium: Stadio Luigi Ferraris; Attendance: 27,717; Referee: Tullio Lanese

16 December 1984 12	Sampdoria	1–0	Avellino	Genoa
	Vialli 73'	Report		Stadium: Stadio Luigi Ferraris; Attendance: 21,360; Referee: Carlo Sguizzato

23 December 1984 13	Internazionale	2–0	Sampdoria	Milan
	Altobelli 9'; Rummenigge 82'	Report		Stadium: San Siro; Referee: Giancarlo Redini

6 January 1985 14	Sampdoria	1–1	Juventus	Genoa
	Souness 74'	Report	Platini 5'	Stadium: Stadio Luigi Ferraris; Attendance: 44,220; Referee: Paolo Bergamo

13 January 1985 15	Atalanta	0–0	Sampdoria	Bergamo
		Report		Stadium: Stadio Comunale; Referee: Pierluigi Lamorgese

20 January 1985 16	Cremonese	1–1	Sampdoria	Cremona
	Nicoletti 78'	Report	Salsano 35'	Stadium: Stadio Giovanni Zini; Referee: Roberto Bianciardi

27 January 1985 17	Sampdoria	0–0	Napoli	Genoa
		Report		Stadium: Stadio Luigi Ferraris; Attendance: 38,087; Referee: Rosario Lo Bello

10 February 1985 18	Ascoli	2–0	Sampdoria	Ascoli Piceno
	Iachini 80'; Nicolini 85' (pen.)	Report		Stadium: Stadio Cino e Lillo Del Duca; Referee: Carlo Longhi

17 February 1985 19	Sampdoria	3–0	Roma	Genoa
	Vialli 45'; Galia 58'; Righetti 67' (o.g.)	Report		Stadium: Stadio Luigi Ferraris; Attendance: 23,998; Referee: Pietro D'Elia

24 February 1985 20	Fiorentina	0–3	Sampdoria	Florence
		Report	Salsano 17'; Francis 27', 68' (pen.)	Stadium: Stadio Comunale; Referee: Salvatore Lombardo

3 March 1985 21	Sampdoria	1–0	Udinese	Genoa
	Vialli 58'	Report		Stadium: Stadio Luigi Ferraris; Attendance: 29,099; Referee: Paolo Bergamo

17 March 1985 22	Torino	1–1	Sampdoria	Turin
	Júnior 21' (pen.)	Report	Corradini 62' (o.g.)	Stadium: Stadio Comunale; Referee: Carlo Longhi

24 March 1985 23	Como	0–0	Sampdoria	Como
		Report		Stadium: Stadio Giuseppe Sinigaglia; Referee: Maurizio Mattei

31 March 1985 24	Sampdoria	1–1	Hellas Verona	Genoa
	Renica 11'	Report	Galderisi 6'	Stadium: Stadio Luigi Ferraris; Attendance: 41,405; Referee: Paolo Casarin

14 April 1985 25	Sampdoria	2–1	Milan	Genoa
	Vierchowod 40'; Souness 72'	Report	Battistini 83'	Stadium: Stadio Luigi Ferraris; Attendance: 43,837; Referee: Liberato Esposito

21 April 1985 26	Lazio	0–3	Sampdoria	Rome
		Report	Scanziani 23'; Salsano 45'; Vierchowod 54'	Stadium: Stadio Olimpico; Referee: Maurizio Mattei

28 April 1985 27	Avellino	2–1	Sampdoria	Avellino
	Diaz 80'; Renica 86'	Report	Francis 47'	Stadium: Stadio Partenio; Referee: Rosario Lo Bello

5 May 1985 28	Sampdoria	1–2	Internazionale	Genoa
	Scanziani 81'	Report	Brady 40' (pen.); Altobelli 65'	Stadium: Stadio Luigi Ferraris; Attendance: 37,150; Referee: Arcangelo Pezzella

12 May 1985 29	Juventus	1–1	Sampdoria	Turin
	Platini 57'	Report	Scanziani 76'	Stadium: Stadio Comunale; Referee: Romeo Paparesta

19 May 1985 30	Sampdoria	3–0	Atalanta	Genoa
	Francis 11'; Salsano 19'; Mancini 53'	Report		Stadium: Stadio Luigi Ferraris; Attendance: 29,733; Referee: Pierluigi Lamorgese

=== Coppa Italia ===
==== Group phase (Group 6) ====
Pos	Team	Pld	W	D	L	GF	GA	GD	Pts
1	Sampdoria	5	3	2	0	17	6	+11	8
2	Bari	5	3	1	1	10	4	+6	7
3	Catanzaro	5	3	1	1	8	6	+2	7
4	Udinese	5	2	1	2	10	8	+2	5
5	Lecce	5	1	1	3	10	9	+1	3
6	Cavese	5	0	0	5	2	24	−22	0

22 August 1984 1	Catanzaro	1–1	Sampdoria	Catanzaro
17:00 CEST	Cascione 18'		Francis 74'	Stadium: Stadio Comunale; Referee: Carlo Longhi

26 August 1984 2	Lecce	0–3	Sampdoria	Lecce
17:00 CEST			Francis 18', 52', 69'	Stadium: Stadio Via del Mare; Referee: Roberto Bianciardi

29 August 1984 3	Sampdoria	8–1	Cavese	Genoa
20:45 CEST	Vialli 1', 42'; Pari 18'; Beccalossi 23', 39'; Salsano 57'; Renica 61'; Mancini 70'		Fratena 28'	Stadium: Stadio Luigi Ferraris; Referee: Paolo Tubertini

2 September 1984 4	Sampdoria	2–1	Bari	Genoa
20:45 CEST	Renica 20'; De Trizio 25' (o.g.)		Sola 10'	Stadium: Stadio Luigi Ferraris; Referee: Maurizio Mattei

9 September 1984 5	Udinese	3–3	Sampdoria	Udine
16:30 CEST	Cattaneo 8'; Zico 40'; De Agostini 72'		Scanziani 15'; Francis 59', 70'	Stadium: Stadio Friuli; Referee: Pierluigi Pairetto

==== Round of 16 ====
13 February 1985 First leg	Pisa	1–2	Sampdoria	Pisa
20:30 CET	Berggreen 46'		Vialli 5', 62'	Stadium: Arena Garibaldi; Referee: Giorgio Baldi

27 February 1985 Second leg	Sampdoria	2–0 (4–1 agg.)	Pisa	Genoa
20:00 CET	Pari 22'; Beccalossi 61'			Stadium: Stadio Luigi Ferraris; Referee: Tullio Lanese

==== Quarter-finals ====
12 June 1985 First leg	Torino	0–0	Sampdoria	Turin
20:30 CEST				Stadium: Stadio Comunale; Referee: Paolo Casarin

19 June 1985 Second leg	Sampdoria	4–2 (4–2 agg.)	Torino	Genoa
20:30 CEST	Vierchowod 10'; Francis 54' (pen.), 63'; Mancini 89'		Francini 60'; Comi 61'	Stadium: Luigi Ferraris; Referee: Salvatore Lombardo

==== Semi-finals ====
23 June 1985 First leg	Fiorentina	0–0	Sampdoria	Florence
20:30 CEST				Stadium: Stadio Comunale; Referee: Pierluigi Pairetto

26 June 1985 Second leg	Sampdoria	3–1 (3–1 agg.)	Fiorentina	Genoa
20:30 CEST	Occhipinti 8' (o.g.); Francis 39' (pen.); Vialli 60'		Pellegrini 75'	Stadium: Stadio Luigi Ferraris; Referee: Paolo Casarin

==== Final ====
30 June 1985 First leg	Milan	0–1	Sampdoria	Milan
20:30 CEST			Souness 24'	Stadium: San Siro; Attendance: 40,000; Referee: Giancarlo Redini

3 July 1985 Second leg	Sampdoria	2–1 (3–1 agg.)	Milan	Genoa
20:30 CEST	Mancini 41' (pen.); Vialli 61'		Virdis 66'	Stadium: Stadio Luigi Ferraris; Attendance: 42,043; Referee: Luigi Agnolin

== Statistics ==
=== Players statistics ===
No.	Pos	Nat	Player	Total		1984–85 Serie A		1984–85 Coppa Italia	
No.	Pos	Nat	Player	Apps	Goals	Apps	Goals	Apps	Goals
	GK	(Italy) ITA	Ivano Bordon	30	-21	30	-21		
	DF	(Italy) ITA	Moreno Mannini	24	0	24	0		
	DF	(Italy) ITA	Luca Pellegrini	26	0	25+1	0		
	DF	(Italy) ITA	Pietro Vierchowod	29	2	29	2		
	DF	(Italy) ITA	Alessandro Renica	26	2	23+3	2		
	MF	(Italy) ITA	Alessandro Scanziani	29	4	29	4		
	MF	(Italy) ITA	Fausto Pari	29	0	27+2	0		
	MF	(Scotland) SCO	Graeme Souness	28	5	28	5		
	MF	(Italy) ITA	Fausto Salsano	28	6	22+6	6		
	FW	(England) ENG	Trevor Francis	24	6	23+1	6		
	FW	(Italy) ITA	Gianluca Vialli	28	3	19+9	3		
	GK	(Italy) ITA	Roberto Bocchino	1	0	0+1	0		
	FW	(Italy) ITA	Roberto Mancini	24	3	19+5	3		
	DF	(Italy) ITA	Roberto Galia	24	1	18+6	1		
	MF	(Italy) ITA	Evaristo Beccalossi	9	0	8+1	0		
	MF	(Italy) ITA	Francesco Casagrande	11	0	5+6	0		
	DF	(Italy) ITA	Antonio Paganin	3	0	1+2	0		
	DF	(Italy) ITA	Enzo Gambaro	2	0	0+2	0		
	MF	(Italy) ITA	Giovanni Picasso	1	0	0+1	0		

- Source: http://calcio-seriea.net/presenze/1984/908/
