= Moreno Mannini =

Italian footballer

Personal information
- Date of birth: 15 August 1962 (age 64)
- Place of birth: Imola, Italy
- Height: 1.82 m (6 ft 0 in)
- Position: Right-back

Youth career
- 1976–1980: Imolese

Senior career*
Years	Team	Apps	(Gls)
1980–1981	Imolese	25	(2)
1981–1982	Forlì	10	(1)
1982–1984	Como	53	(5)
1984–1999	Sampdoria	377	(7)
1999–2000	Nottingham Forest	10	(0)
2000	Imolese	1	(0)
Total		476	(15)

International career
1992–1993	Italy	10	(0)
- * Club domestic league appearances and goals

Moreno Mannini (Italian pronunciation: [moˈrɛːno manˈniːni]; born 15 August 1962) is an Italian former professional footballer who played as a right-back.

== Club career ==
Born in Imola, Province of Bologna, Mannini started playing professionally with Como in Serie B, appearing in 36 games in his second season as the Lombardy team promoted to Serie A. In the following off-season he signed with fellow top-divisioner Sampdoria, where he remained for the following 15 years almost always as an undisputed starter. In the late 1980s and early 1990s, he was part of a defensive sector which also included Gianluca Pagliuca, Luca Pellegrini, Pietro Vierchowod and Amedeo Carboni, with Roberto Mancini and Gianluca Vialli providing the goals.

During his spell with Samp, Mannini won four Coppa Italia and the 1991 national championship, scoring a crucial goal in the latter competition on 19 May in a 3–0 home win against Lecce. He also appeared in two UEFA finals in the 1990s, winning the UEFA Cup Winners' Cup against Anderlecht and losing the European Cup against Barcelona, the latter match played at Wembley.

In the 1999 summer, following Sampdoria's top level relegation, 37-year-old Mannini – who appeared in 510 official games for the club, netting eight times – left Genoa and signed for Nottingham Forest in the Football League Championship, reuniting at the English side with former Sampdoria teammate (and manager) David Platt. He made his official debut on 7 August 1999 in a 3–1 away loss against Ipswich Town, leaving in the following transfer window and closing out his career after a few months with his first team, amateurs Imolese.

== International career ==
Mannini gained ten caps for Italy, his debut coming on 19 February 1992 at nearly 30 years of age, in a 4–0 friendly win with San Marino in Cesena.

Barred by Giuseppe Bergomi first and Antonio Benarrivo later, he never attended any major international tournament, however.

== Honours ==
Sampdoria

- UEFA Cup Winners' Cup: 1989–90; runner-up 1988–89
- Serie A: 1990–91
- Coppa Italia: 1984–85, 1987–88, 1988–89, 1993–94; runner-up 1985–86, 1990–91
- Italian Supercup: 1991; runner-up 1988, 1989, 1994
- European Cup: runner-up 1991–92
