= 1991 Supercoppa Italiana =

- Event: Supercoppa Italiana
Sampdoria	Roma
Serie A	Coppa Italia
1	0
- Date: 24 August 1991
- Venue: Marassi, Genoa, Italy
- Referee: Tullio Lanese
- Attendance: 21,120

The 1991 Supercoppa Italiana was a match contested by 1990–91 Serie A winners Sampdoria and 1990–91 Coppa Italia winners Roma.

The match took place on 24 August 1991 in Marassi, Genoa and resulted in a 1–0 victory for Sampdoria.

== Match details ==
24 August 1991
20:30 MEST

Sampdoria	1–0	Roma
Mancini 75'	(Report)

Stadio Luigi Ferraris, Genoa
Attendance: 21,120
Referee: Tullio Lanese

Sampdoria	Roma

SAMPDORIA:
GK	1	(Italy) Gianluca Pagliuca
RB	2	(Italy) Moreno Mannini
CB	3	(Italy) Marco Lanna
CB	5	(Italy) Pietro Vierchowod
LB	6	(Socialist Federal Republic of Yugoslavia) Srečko Katanec
RM	7	(Italy) Attilio Lombardo	(substituted off) 76'
CM	4	(Italy) Fausto Pari
CM	8	(Brazil) Toninho Cerezo	(substituted off) 61'
LM	11	(Brazil) Paulo Silas
CF	9	(Italy) Gianluca Vialli
CF	10	(Italy) Roberto Mancini (c)
Substitutes:
MF	14	(Italy) Giovanni Invernizzi	(substituted on) 61'
CB	16	(Italy) Renato Buso	(substituted on) 76'
Manager:
(Socialist Federal Republic of Yugoslavia) Vujadin Boškov

ROMA:
GK	1	(Italy) Giovanni Cervone
RB	6	(Italy) Sebino Nela
CB	2	(Italy) Luigi Garzja
CB	5	(Brazil) Aldair
LB	3	(Italy) Amedeo Carboni
RM	7	(Germany) Thomas Häßler
CM	4	(Italy) Walter Bonacina
LM	8	(Italy) Fabrizio Di Mauro	(substituted off) 78'
AM	10	(Italy) Giuseppe Giannini (c)
CF	9	(Germany) Rudi Völler	(substituted off) 23'
CF	11	(Italy) Roberto Muzzi
Substitutes:
DF	13	(Italy) Marco De Marchi	(substituted on) 23'
MF	15	(Italy) Fausto Salsano	(substituted on) 78'
Manager:
(Italy) Ottavio Bianchi

MATCH OFFICIALS

- Assistant referees:
- Fourth official:

MATCH RULES

- 90 minutes.
- 30 minutes of extra-time if necessary.
- Penalty shoot-out if scores still level.
- Five named substitutes
- Maximum of 2 substitutions.

== See also ==
- 1991–92 AS Roma season
- 1991–92 UC Sampdoria season
