= Gianluca Vialli =

Italian football player and manager (1964–2023)

Gianluca Vialli OMRI
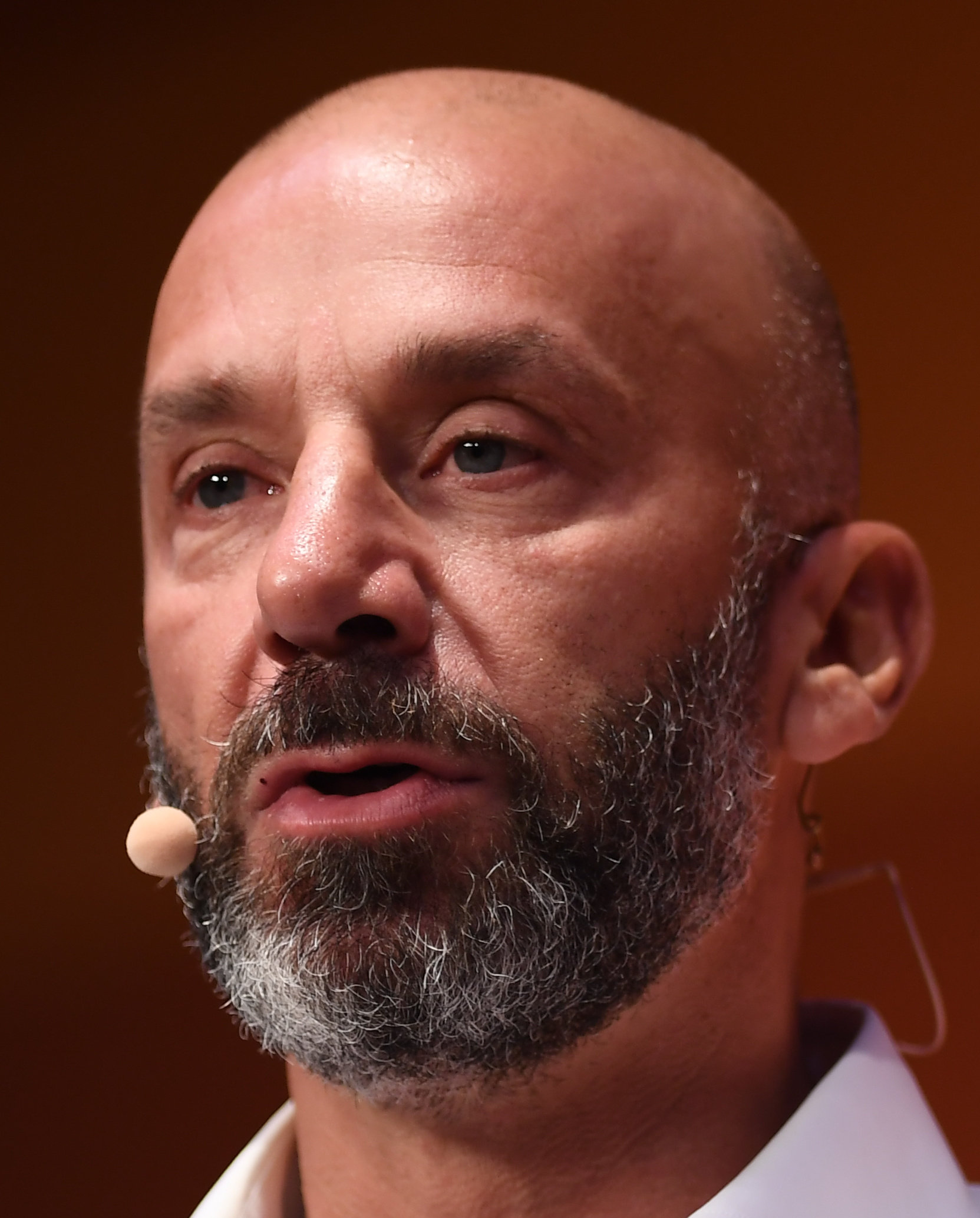
- Vialli in 2017

Personal information
- Full name: Gianluca Vialli
- Date of birth: 9 July 1964
- Place of birth: Cremona, Italy
- Date of death: 5 January 2023 (aged 58)
- Place of death: London, England
- Height: 1.80 m (5 ft 11 in)
- Position: Striker

Youth career
- 1973–1978: Pizzighettone
- 1978–1980: Cremonese

Senior career*
Years	Team	Apps	(Gls)
1980–1984	Cremonese	105	(23)
1984–1992	Sampdoria	223	(85)
1992–1996	Juventus	102	(38)
1996–1999	Chelsea	58	(21)
Total		488	(167)

International career
1982–1986	Italy U21	20	(11)
1985–1992	Italy	59	(16)

Managerial career
- 1998–2000: Chelsea
- 2001–2002: Watford
Medal record
Men's football
Representing Italy (as coordinator)
UEFA European Championship
Winner	2020
Representing Italy (as player)
FIFA World Cup
Third place	1990
UEFA European Under-21 Championship
Runner-up	1986
- * Club domestic league appearances and goals

Gianluca Vialli (Italian pronunciation: [dʒanˈluːka viˈalli, - ˈvjalli]; 9 July 1964 – 5 January 2023) was an Italian football player and manager who played as a striker. Vialli started his club career at his hometown club Cremonese in 1980, where he made 105 league appearances and scored 23 goals. His performances impressed Sampdoria, who signed him in 1984 and with whom he scored 85 league goals, won three Italian cups, Serie A and the European Cup Winners Cup.

In 1992, Vialli transferred to Juventus for a world record £12.5 million. During his time at the Turin club, he won the Italian Cup, Serie A, Italian Supercup, UEFA Champions League and the UEFA Cup. In 1996, Vialli joined Chelsea and became their player-manager the following season. In England, he won the FA Cup, League Cup, UEFA Cup Winners Cup and UEFA Super Cup. He is one of nine footballers to have won the three main European club competitions and the only forward to have done so; he is also the only player in European footballing history to hold both winners and runners-up medals in all three mainstream UEFA club competitions, including two winners medals for the now-defunct UEFA Cup Winners' Cup.

At international level, Vialli represented the Italy national team in two FIFA World Cups, in 1986 and (on home soil) in 1990. He also took part at UEFA Euro 1988, helping his nation to a semi-final finish, and was elected to the team of the tournament. During his twenty-year-long career as a professional footballer, he scored 259 goals at club level, 16 goals with the national team, and 11 goals with the Italy national under-21 football team, for a total of 286 goals in more than 500 appearances, making him the tenth-highest scoring Italian player in all competitions.

On his retirement from playing, Vialli went into management and later punditry, and worked as a commentator for Sky Italia. He was part of the Italy national team non-playing staff as a coordinator when they won UEFA Euro 2020; he stepped back from this role days before his death from cancer.

== Club career ==
=== Cremonese ===
Vialli's senior career started in 1980 when he signed for local club Cremonese in Serie C1, winning promotion to Serie B. After scoring ten goals for the club as a winger in the 1983–84 Serie B season, he was transferred to Sampdoria.

=== Sampdoria ===
Vialli played for Sampdoria between 1984 and 1992, during which time the club had their most successful period in their history. At Sampdoria, he formed a prolific strike partnership with teammate and friend Roberto Mancini, earning the nickname 'The Goal Twins' (in Italian I Gemelli del Gol). Vialli also had a very good relationship with club president Paolo Mantovani and coach Vujadin Boškov, who were both described by Vialli as being father figures. Sampdoria won their first ever Italian Cup in 1985 with Vialli scoring in the final, and would win it again in 1988 and 1989, when Vialli would score a record 13 goals in the tournament. This led to two notable European Cup Winners' Cup runs, where Sampdoria lost the 1989 final before winning the trophy in 1990, with Vialli scoring both goals in the final victory over Anderlecht, and finishing the tournament as top-scorer.

Despite losing out to Milan in the 1990 European Super Cup, the club went on to win their first ever Serie A championship in the 1990–91 season, in which Vialli was league top scorer with 19 goals – celebrating many of his goals with a backflip, including one against Inter Milan. The following season, Sampdoria won the Supercoppa Italiana and reached the European Cup final, but Vialli would miss a number of chances as Johan Cruyff's Barcelona "Dream Team" won 1–0. This would be his last game with Sampdoria.

=== Juventus ===
Vialli moved to Juventus shortly after the 1992 European Cup final loss for a world record fee of £12.5 million. His first Juventus contract was negotiated for him by Sampdoria president Mantovani, as Vialli did not have an agent. Although he struggled with injury, Vialli won the UEFA Cup in his first season with Juventus playing alongside players such as Roberto Baggio, Pierluigi Casiraghi, Paolo Di Canio and Andreas Möller, among other players, under manager Giovanni Trapattoni. During the 1993 UEFA Cup Final against Borussia Dortmund, Vialli set-up Baggio's decisive first goal in the first leg.

Following the arrival of manager Marcello Lippi, Vialli underwent an intense fitness and muscle strengthening training regime to lose weight, and gain speed, agility, physical strength, and stamina. Vialli refound his goalscoring form throughout the season, and through his leadership and decisive performances, he helped Juventus win the Scudetto (his second overall) and the Italian Cup in 1995, scoring 17 league goals during the season; the club also narrowly missed out on a treble after suffering a defeat in the 1995 UEFA Cup Final to Parma, despite Vialli scoring a spectacular second leg goal.

In January 1996, with his contract expiring in summer, Vialli decided to leave Juventus at the end of the season. He would finish his final season with Juventus by captaining the side to a Supercoppa Italiana victory (with Vialli scoring the only goal of the match) and a Champions League final win over defending champions AFC Ajax, playing alongside Del Piero and Fabrizio Ravanelli. Vialli's only two goals in the latter competition came in the semi-finals against Nantes; he scored the opening goal in a 2–0 home victory in the first-leg, and then scored again during the second leg, in addition to assisting Paulo Sousa's decisive goal, which allowed Juventus to advance to the final 4–3 on aggregate. During his four seasons with the club he totalled 102 appearances, scoring 38 goals.

=== Chelsea ===
Vialli joined Chelsea in the summer of 1996 on a free transfer as part of manager Ruud Gullit's rebuilding of the side, despite having been strongly linked with Scottish champions Rangers. Vialli adapted quickly to life in London due to his grasp of the English language and use of English idioms. The team won the FA Cup in Vialli's first season, with the Italian scoring two goals in a 4–2 comeback over Liverpool in the fourth round. However, a feud with Gullit saw him regularly left out of the starting line-up; in the final itself he was limited to a five-minute appearance as a late substitute.

During the 1997–98 season, Vialli scored four goals in a league win over Barnsley and a hat-trick against Norwegian side Tromsø in the Cup Winners' Cup, but still could not cement his place in the side under Gullit. However, following Gullit's dismissal in early 1998, Vialli assumed the role of a player-manager, winning the Cup Winners' Cup in 1998, and the League Cup. Although he left himself out of the squad for the League Cup final, Vialli finished the season as Chelsea's top scorer. He then began his first full season as player-manager with a 1–0 victory over Champions League winners Real Madrid in the UEFA Super Cup.

Vialli retired from professional football at the end of the 1998–99 season to focus on his position as Chelsea's manager. He made his last professional appearance in Chelsea's final match of the 1998–99 Premier League, scoring the winning goal against Derby County at Stamford Bridge and finishing his Chelsea career with 83 appearances and 40 goals.

== Managerial career ==
=== Chelsea ===
Gullit was sacked as Chelsea manager in February 1998 and 33-year-old Vialli was appointed player-manager, becoming the first Italian to manage in the Premier League. Chelsea were already in the semi-finals of the League Cup and the quarter-finals of the European Cup Winners' Cup, and went on to win both competitions under Vialli, as well as finishing fourth in the Premier League. In beating VfB Stuttgart at the Cup Winners' Cup final on 13 May 1998, at 33 years and 308 days old, Vialli became the youngest manager ever to win a UEFA competition. The record stood for thirteen years until 18 May 2011 when FC Porto's André Villas-Boas won the Europa League at the age of 33 years and 213 days.

The following season Chelsea won the UEFA Super Cup by beating Real Madrid 1–0, and finished third in the Premier League, just four points behind champions Manchester United in what was Chelsea's highest league finish since 1970, when they also finished third. After this, Vialli retired from playing.

The following season saw Chelsea make their debut in the UEFA Champions League, where they reached the quarter-finals. After a 3–1 first leg victory over Barcelona, they were eventually knocked out 4–6 on aggregate following a 5–1 return leg loss at Camp Nou after extra time. Despite a fifth-place finish in the Premier League, the campaign ended on a high note when Vialli guided Chelsea to a win over Aston Villa in the 2000 FA Cup final.

The 2000–01 season started brightly, with Chelsea beating Manchester United to win the Charity Shield, Vialli's fifth official trophy with the club in less than three years. Vialli was sacked five games into the season after an indifferent start and having fallen out with several players, including Gianfranco Zola, Didier Deschamps and Dan Petrescu.

=== Watford ===
Vialli then took up an offer to manage First Division club Watford in 2001–02. The club invested in a number of high-profile signings including AC Milan icon Filippo Galli, Ramon Vega, Patrick Blondeau and Pierre Issa, but only finished an unimpressive 14th and Vialli was sacked after one year. Following this, he was drawn into a lengthy dispute with the club over the payment of the remainder of his contract.

== International career ==
Vialli was a member of Italy's under-21 team for both the 1984 and 1986 UEFA European Under-21 Football Championships where the Azzurrini finished third and second respectively. Overall Vialli represented the Italy U21 team 20 times, scoring 11 goals. He was also the top scorer in the 1986 Under-21 European Championship, with 4 goals, where Italy lost the final to Spain on penalties.

In 1985, Vialli made his debut for the Italy senior team in a friendly match against Poland. He was included in Italy's squad for the 1986 FIFA World Cup held in Mexico, appearing with an all-shaved head as a substitute in all four of Italy's matches as back-up for Bruno Conti.

Vialli scored his first goal for Italy in a UEFA Euro 1988 qualifier against Malta in 1986. He was included in Italy's squad for the finals of the Euro 1988 competition and scored the winning goal against Spain in the group stage. Although Italy were knocked out by the Soviet Union in the semi-final after losing 0–2, Vialli was named in UEFA's team of the tournament.

With the 1990 FIFA World Cup being held on home soil, Vialli was named part of the squad and he was expected to make a huge impact for the hosts. However, after failing to score in the first match against Austria, despite setting up the winning goal via a cross, Vialli missed a penalty against the United States in the next match, hitting the lower near post with keeper Tony Meola diving the other way; he did play a role in the decisive goal, however, scored by Giuseppe Giannini, with his dummy on Roberto Donadoni's pass, following a team move. He was subsequently dropped from the team in favour of the attacking duo of Roberto Baggio and Salvatore Schillaci, the latter of whom had scored the winning goal against Austria from Vialli's assist, after appearing as a substitute. Vialli returned to the team for the semi-final against Argentina and played a role in Italy's opening goal after his shot on goal was blocked by Argentina keeper Goycochea and the rebound fell to Schillaci. He was substituted in the second half as Italy were eliminated on penalties, eventually finishing the tournament in third place. Because Italy assigned jersey numbers alphabetically to players for the World Cup (beginning with defenders, then midfielders, and finally attackers) Vialli wore the number 21 during the World Cup. Overall, he finished the tournament with two assists, which were both provided for the golden boot winner Schillaci.

Vialli returned to lead Italy's attack during the qualifying games for the UEFA Euro 1992 Championship under manager Vicini, scoring in Italy's 3–1 win over Hungary and 2–0 win over Cyprus in 1991. However, Italy missed out on qualifying after finishing second behind the Soviet Union in Group 3.

Vialli made his last appearance for the Azzurri in December 1992; his strained relationship with coach Arrigo Sacchi brought his international career to a premature end, despite his club success during the 1990s. It is rumoured that Vialli played a prank on Sacchi, which was the reason for his dropping from the national team.

Overall, Vialli made 59 appearances for Italy, scoring 16 goals.

== Style of play ==
Vialli was considered a versatile forward, who was capable of playing in multiple places along the front line; throughout his career. He was played on the wing, or in a deeper, supporting role, although his preferred position was in the centre as a main striker, where he could take advantage of his offensive movement and opportunism inside the box, as well as his eye for goal. A prolific goalscorer, Vialli was known for his shooting power and accuracy with both feet as well as his head, which allowed him to finish off chances both inside and outside the penalty area.

In addition to his ability to score goals, Vialli was also capable of playing off of and creating chances for his teammates, courtesy of his good vision, tactical intelligence, and distribution, which also occasionally saw him play in deeper roles in midfield, as a playmaker or attacking midfielder; he was also endowed with good technical ability, dribbling skills, and ball control, which allowed him to play the ball first time, or beat opponents and retain possession under pressure. A quick, tenacious, hardworking, and energetic player, Vialli was gifted with pace, physicality, and stamina, and was known for his willingness to press opponents off the ball to win back possession. Vialli was seen as a new breed of striker in Italian football, who combined technique and goalscoring ability with speed, athleticism, and physical power.

Because of his outstanding athleticism, strength, and agility, he also excelled in the air, and had a penchant for scoring acrobatic goals from volleys and bicycle kicks, which led his Juventus manager Marcello Lippi and president Gianni Agnelli at the time to praise him and compare him to legendary Italian striker Gigi Riva. In addition to his footballing skills, he was also highly regarded for his dedication, leadership qualities, strong mentality, and his charismatic influence on the pitch. Marino Bortoletti of Treccani described Vialli as a "modern striker, gifted with power and style", and as "the most representative player of his generation", along with compatriots Roberto Baggio and Franco Baresi.

== Outside of professional football ==
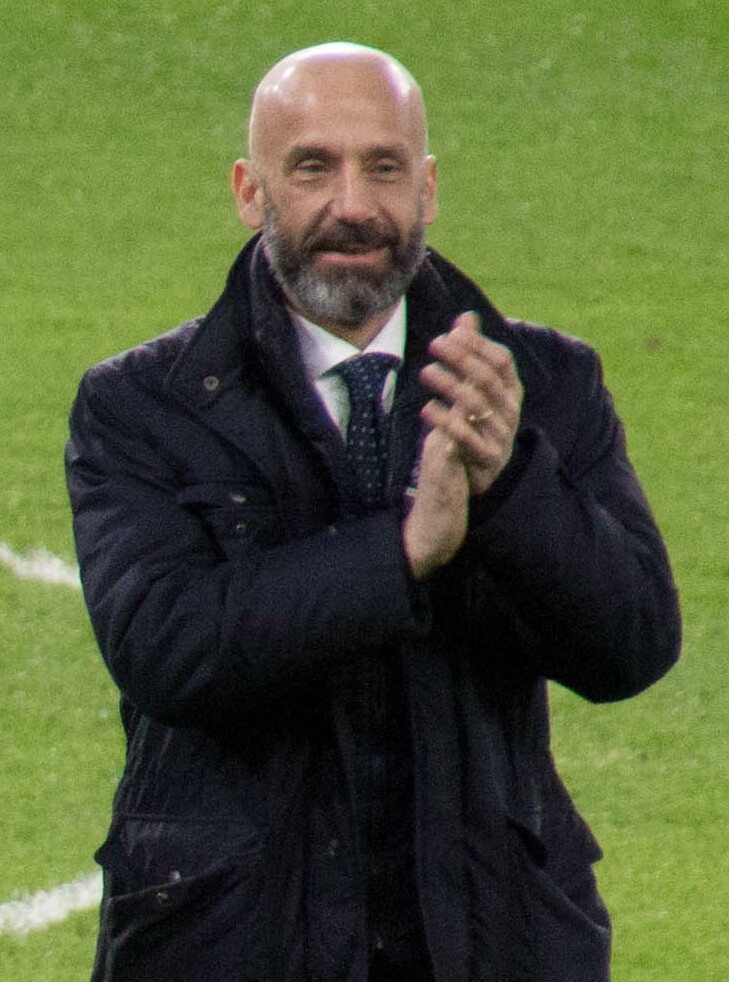
Vialli in 2018

In 2006, Vialli released The Italian Job: A Journey to the Heart of Two Great Footballing Cultures, co-written with his close friend and football journalist, Gabriele Marcotti. Written over a period of two and a half years from November 2003 until early 2006, the book discusses the differences between English and Italian football. He also attributes his tendency to play as a wide attacker to playing on a field that was short and wide as a young boy. Vialli donated the proceeds of the book to the "Fondazione Vialli e Mauro per la ricerca e lo sport", which is a charitable foundation he founded together with former player Massimo Mauro to raise funds for research into cancer and amyotrophic lateral sclerosis (ALS).

From the late 2000s Vialli worked as a TV football commentator for Sky Italia. In 2007, he was linked with a move to the manager's position at Queens Park Rangers, following the club takeover by Flavio Briatore and Bernie Ecclestone and the dismissal of John Gregory as manager, but ultimately declined any interest in the job. During UEFA Euro 2012, he appeared as a pundit for the BBC's coverage of the tournament.

Vialli, alongside ex-Morgan Stanley and Goldman Sachs investment banker Fausto Zanetton, co-founded Tifosy, a sports investment platform, with the aim of allowing anybody to invest in professional sports. Zanetton, its CEO, explained that "whilst there is an incredible passion and willingness to invest in sports, there is currently no way to do so for the average fan or investor...You no longer need to be a billionaire to invest in professional sports clubs." At Web Summit 2016, Vialli discussed his latest venture with Tifosy.

In October 2019, Vialli was appointed new delegation chief of the Italy national football team under head coach and personal friend Roberto Mancini (his former teammate and striking partner at Sampdoria), a position unfilled since Gigi Riva's retirement in 2013. On 11 July 2021, Italy won UEFA Euro 2020 after a 3–2 victory in a penalty shoot-out after a 1–1 draw after extra-time against England in the final.

== Personal life and death ==
He was born into a wealthy family. His father was a "self-made millionaire"; it is often reported that his father is a billionaire but this was denied by his mother. He married Cathryn White-Cooper on 26 August 2003 and had two daughters, Olivia and Sofia. Vialli was a keen golfer and played at the Dunhill Links Championship pro-am event. He continued to live in the SW6 postcode of London 20 years after leaving Chelsea.

In November 2018, Vialli revealed that he had successfully overcome a year-long illness with pancreatic cancer. He was treated at the Royal Marsden Hospital in London. He was given the all-clear from pancreatic cancer in April 2020, but in December 2021 revealed that he had been diagnosed with the disease for a second time. He died on the night between 5 and 6 January 2023, in the Royal Marsden Hospital, at age 58.

On 9 September 2023, Chelsea played a legends match against Bayern Munich – a rematch of the 2012 Champions League final – at Stamford Bridge in Vialli's memory. Chelsea won 4–0 with proceeds benefiting The Chelsea Foundation and The Royal Marsden Cancer Charity.

== Career statistics ==
=== Club ===
Appearances and goals by club, season and competition
Club	Season	League			National cup (Note: Includes Coppa Italia, FA Cup)		League cup (Note: Includes Football League Cup)		Europe		Other		Total	
Club	Season	Division	Apps	Goals	Apps	Goals	Apps	Goals	Apps	Goals	Apps	Goals	Apps	Goals
Cremonese	1980–81	Serie C1	2	0	0	0	–		–		–		2	0
Cremonese	1981–82	Serie B	31	5	1	0	–		–		–		32	5
Cremonese	1982–83	Serie B	35	8	2	0	–		–		–		37	8
Cremonese	1983–84	Serie B	37	10	5	2	–		–		–		42	12
Cremonese	Total		105	23	8	2	–		–		–		113	25
Sampdoria	1984–85	Serie A	28	3	13	6	–		–		–		41	9
Sampdoria	1985–86	Serie A	28	6	7	2	–		4 (Note: Appearances in European Cup Winners' Cup)	0	–		39	8
Sampdoria	1986–87	Serie A	28	12	5	4	–		–		–		33	16
Sampdoria	1987–88	Serie A	30	10	13	3	–		–		–		43	13
Sampdoria	1988–89	Serie A	30	14	14	13	–		7	5	1 (Note: Appearance in Supercoppa Italiana)	1	52	33
Sampdoria	1989–90	Serie A	22	10	2	2	–		8	7	1	0	33	19
Sampdoria	1990–91	Serie A	26	19	7	3	–		4	1	1 (Note: Appearance in European Super Cup)	0	38	23
Sampdoria	1991–92	Serie A	31	11	6	3	–		11 (Note: Appearances in European Cup)	6	1	0	49	20
Sampdoria	Total		223	85	67	36	–		34	19	4	1	328	141
Juventus	1992–93	Serie A	32	6	7	2	–		10 (Note: Appearances in UEFA Cup)	5	–		49	13
Juventus	1993–94	Serie A	10	4	0	0	–		2	0	–		12	4
Juventus	1994–95	Serie A	30	17	7	3	–		9	2	–		46	22
Juventus	1995–96	Serie A	30	11	0	0	–		7 (Note: Appearances in UEFA Champions League)	2	1	1	38	14
Juventus	Total		102	38	14	5	–		28	9	1	1	145	53
Chelsea	1996–97	Premier League	28	9	5	2	1	0	–		–		34	11
Chelsea	1997–98	Premier League	21	11	1	2	3	0	8	6	1 (Note: Appearance in FA Charity Shield)	0	34	19
Chelsea	1998–99	Premier League	9	1	3	2	3	6	5	1	0	0	20	10
Chelsea	Total		58	21	9	6	7	6	13	7	1	0	88	40
Career total			488	167	98	49	7	6	75	35	6	2	674	259

=== International ===
Appearances and goals by national team and year
National team	Year	Apps	Goals
Italy	1985	1	0
Italy	1986	10	0
Italy	1987	10	5
Italy	1988	11	5
Italy	1989	10	1
Italy	1990	3	0
Italy	1991	8	3
Italy	1992	6	2
Total		59	16

Scores and results list Italy's goal tally first, score column indicates score after each Vialli goal.

List of international goals scored by Gianluca Vialli
No.	Date	Venue	Opponent	Score	Result	Competition
1	24 January 1987	Stadio Comunale, Bergamo, Italy	Malta	5–0	5–0	UEFA Euro 1988 qualifying
2	10 June 1987	Letzigrund, Zürich, Switzerland	Argentina	3–1	3–1	Friendly
3	14 November 1987	Stadio San Paolo, Naples, Italy	Sweden	1–0	2–1	UEFA Euro 1988 qualifying
4	14 November 1987	Stadio San Paolo, Naples, Italy	Sweden	2–1	2–1	UEFA Euro 1988 qualifying
5	5 December 1987	San Siro, Milan, Italy	Portugal	1–0	3–0	UEFA Euro 1988 qualifying
6	20 February 1988	Stadio della Vittoria, Bari, Italy	Soviet Union	2–1	4–1	Friendly
7	20 February 1988	Stadio della Vittoria, Bari, Italy	Soviet Union	3–1	4–1	Friendly
8	31 March 1988	Stadion Poljud, Split, Yugoslavia	Yugoslavia	1–0	1–1	Friendly
9	14 June 1988	Waldstadion, Frankfurt, West Germany	Spain	1–0	1–0	UEFA Euro 1988
10	16 November 1988	Stadio Olimpico, Rome, Italy	Netherlands	1–0	1–0	Friendly
11	26 April 1989	Stadio Erasmo Iacovone, Taranto, Italy	Hungary	1–0	4–0	Friendly
12	1 May 1991	Stadio Arechi, Salerno, Italy	Hungary	3–0	3–1	UEFA Euro 1992 qualifying
13	12 June 1991	Eleda Stadion, Malmö, Sweden	Denmark	2–0	2–0	Friendly
14	21 December 1991	Stadio Pino Zaccheria, Foggia, Italy	Cyprus	1–0	2–0	UEFA Euro 1992 qualifying
15	9 September 1992	Philips Stadion, Eindhoven, Netherlands	Netherlands	3–2	3–2	Friendly
16	19 December 1992	Ta' Qali National Stadium, Ta' Qali, Malta	Malta	1–0	2–1	1994 FIFA World Cup qualification

== Managerial statistics ==
Team	From	To	Record				
Team	From	To	G	W	D	L	Win %
Chelsea	12 February 1998	12 September 2000	143	76	38	29	53.15
Watford	1 June 2001	14 June 2002	52	20	11	21	38.46
Career total			195	96	49	50	49.23

== Honours ==
=== Player ===
Sampdoria

- Serie A: 1990–91
- Coppa Italia: 1984–85, 1987–88, 1988–89
- Supercoppa Italiana: 1991
- UEFA Cup Winners' Cup: 1989–90; runner-up: 1988–89
- European Cup runner-up: 1991–92

Juventus

- Serie A: 1994–95
- Coppa Italia: 1994–95
- Supercoppa Italiana: 1995
- UEFA Champions League: 1995–96
- UEFA Cup: 1992–93; runner-up: 1994–95

Chelsea

- FA Cup: 1996–97
- Football League Cup: 1997–98
- UEFA Cup Winners' Cup: 1997–98

Italy U21

- UEFA European Under-21 Championship runner-up: 1986

Italy

- FIFA World Cup third place: 1990
- Scania 100 Tournament: 1991

Individual

- UEFA European Under-21 Championship top-scorer: 1986 (four goals)
- UEFA European Championship Team of the Tournament: 1988
- Coppa Italia top scorer: 1988–89 (13 goals)
- UEFA Cup Winners' Cup top scorer: 1989–90 (seven goals)
- Capocannoniere: 1990–91 (19 goals)
- World Soccer's World Player of the Year: 1995
- Italian Football Hall of Fame: 2015
- Premio internazionale Giacinto Facchetti: 2018
- Juventus FC Hall of Fame: 2025

=== Manager ===
Chelsea

- FA Cup: 1999–2000
- Football League Cup: 1997–98
- FA Charity Shield: 2000
- UEFA Cup Winners' Cup: 1997–98
- UEFA Super Cup: 1998

=== Orders ===
- 5th Class / Knight: Cavaliere Ordine al Merito della Repubblica Italiana: 1991

- 3rd Class / Commander: Commendatore Ordine al Merito della Repubblica Italiana: 2021
