= Michele Zanutta =

Italian footballer

Personal information
- Date of birth: 20 October 1967 (age 59)
- Place of birth: Carlino, Italy
- Height: 1.83 m (6 ft 0 in)
- Position: Defender

Youth career
- Sampdoria

Senior career*
Years	Team	Apps	(Gls)
1984–1988	Sampdoria	1	(0)
1988	→ Parma (loan)	0	(0)
1988–1995	Reggiana	211	(4)
1995	Venezia	10	(0)
1995–2001	Pescara	177	(7)
2001–2002	Giulianova	7	(0)
2002–2003	Francavilla		
2004	Sangiorgina		
2004–2005	Sacilese	16	(0)
2005–2006	Sangiorgina		
Total		422	(11)

International career
1987	Italy U20	3	(0)
- * Club domestic league appearances and goals

Michele Zanutta (born 20 October 1967), is an Italian former professional footballer who played as a defender.

== Career ==
Zanutta played for several Italian teams, in special Sampdoria, for which he was part of the conquest of two Coppa Italia, and Reggiana, where he won the Serie C1 and Serie B.

Zanutta also competed at international level for Italy U20 in the 1987 FIFA World Youth Championship.

== Honours ==
Sampdoria

- Coppa Italia: 1984–85, 1987–88

Reggiana

- Serie C1: 1988–89 (group A)
- Serie B: 1992–93
