= 1991–92 Serie B =

Italian football league season

Serie B
- Season: 1991–92
- Promoted: Brescia (2nd title); Pescara; Ancona; Udinese
- Relegated: Casertana; Palermo; Messina; Avellino
- Matches: 380
- Goals: 740 (1.95 per match)
- Top goalscorer: (Italy) Maurizio Ganz (19 goals)

Serie B 1991-92 team distribution

The Serie B 1991–92 was the sixtieth tournament of this competition played in Italy since its creation.

== Teams ==
Piacenza, Venezia, Casertana and Palermo had been promoted from Serie C, while Lecce, Pisa, Cesena and Bologna had been relegated from Serie A.

== Final classification ==
Pos	Team	Pld	W	D	L	GF	GA	GD	Pts	Promotion or relegation
1	Brescia (P, C)	38	14	21	3	54	31	+23	49	Promotion to Serie A
2	Pescara (P)	38	15	16	7	58	43	+15	46	Promotion to Serie A
3	Ancona (P)	38	12	21	5	36	27	+9	45	Promotion to Serie A
4	Udinese (P)	38	13	18	7	41	33	+8	44	Promotion to Serie A
5	Cosenza	38	13	16	9	39	36	+3	42	
6	Pisa	38	12	15	11	40	36	+4	39	
7	Reggiana	38	11	16	11	33	32	+1	38	
8	Cesena	38	10	17	11	38	33	+5	37	
8	Lucchese	38	8	21	9	34	34	0	37	
8	Lecce	38	12	13	13	35	38	−3	37	
11	Piacenza	38	11	14	13	37	39	−2	36	
11	Padova	38	8	20	10	30	32	−2	36	
11	Bologna	38	12	12	14	37	41	−4	36	
11	Modena	38	11	14	13	33	41	−8	36	
15	Venezia	38	7	21	10	33	36	−3	35	
16	Taranto	38	9	17	12	26	34	−8	35	Relegation tie-breaker (Note: Qualified to the relegation tie-breaker for worst head-to-head points against Venezia, and best ones against Palermo.)
17	Casertana (R)	38	8	19	11	31	40	−9	35	Serie C1 after tie-breaker
18	Palermo (R)	38	11	13	14	41	43	−2	35	Relegation to Serie C1
19	Messina (R)	38	10	13	15	31	38	−7	33	Relegation to Serie C1
20	Avellino (R)	38	8	13	17	33	53	−20	29	Relegation to Serie C1

Source: Head-to-head points used for three or more clubs finishing at the same result.
(C) Champions; (P) Promoted; (R) Relegated

== Results ==
Home \ Away	ANC	AVE	BOL	BRE	CST	CES	COS	LCE	LUC	MES	MOD	PAD	PAL	PES	PIA	PIS	REA	TAR	UDI	VEN
Ancona		2–0	0–2	0–0	2–0	1–1	0–0	2–1	2–1	2–0	3–2	2–0	1–1	2–2	2–1	2–0	2–0	0–0	0–2	2–1
Avellino	0–0		1–0	1–3	0–0	0–1	2–2	0–0	3–2	2–1	1–2	1–0	2–1	1–1	0–1	2–2	2–1	2–0	1–1	2–0
Bologna	1–1	2–2		2–1	2–3	1–0	2–1	1–1	2–0	2–2	0–0	4–1	0–0	1–1	2–0	0–1	0–2	1–0	4–2	1–1
Brescia	2–0	2–0	1–0		4–0	1–1	1–1	1–2	2–2	1–0	2–0	1–1	4–2	2–0	1–0	3–0	2–1	1–1	1–1	1–1
Casertana	0–0	0–0	1–0	0–0		2–0	0–1	2–1	0–1	0–0	0–0	0–0	1–0	2–2	3–2	0–0	0–1	3–0	0–0	0–0
Cesena	1–1	4–0	1–0	3–3	1–1		1–0	0–0	1–1	0–0	2–0	1–0	2–1	0–1	2–1	1–2	1–1	3–0	1–1	0–0
Cosenza	0–0	1–0	0–1	3–1	2–0	1–0		2–1	2–1	0–0	1–0	1–0	3–0	1–1	2–0	2–0	0–0	2–1	1–1	1–1
Lecce	0–0	3–1	1–0	0–0	2–1	1–1	1–0		0–1	0–2	2–1	4–1	1–0	1–3	2–0	1–1	0–1	3–1	1–0	1–0
Lucchese	0–0	3–1	2–1	1–1	2–2	2–1	1–1	0–0		0–0	1–0	1–1	1–1	0–1	1–1	1–1	0–1	0–0	0–0	1–1
Messina	0–0	2–0	0–1	0–2	1–1	1–1	2–0	1–1	2–1		1–0	1–0	0–0	0–0	0–3	2–0	1–1	3–1	2–0	3–2
Modena	0–0	0–0	1–0	2–2	2–1	0–0	2–1	3–1	1–1	2–1		1–1	1–1	2–0	0–0	3–1	0–0	1–0	2–0	1–1
Padova	1–1	0–0	0–0	0–0	0–0	1–0	3–0	1–1	1–1	4–0	2–0		2–1	2–0	1–1	1–1	0–1	1–1	1–1	0–0
Palermo	1–1	1–0	2–1	1–1	3–0	1–1	1–1	1–0	1–0	2–1	2–0	2–0		2–0	1–1	1–1	1–0	1–1	3–1	1–1
Pescara	2–2	5–1	5–0	1–1	4–2	2–1	3–1	2–0	0–0	1–0	3–1	1–1	2–1		1–1	1–1	1–1	1–1	2–2	1–0
Piacenza	0–0	2–1	0–1	1–1	0–0	1–3	1–1	1–0	0–2	2–1	3–0	0–0	2–1	2–2		3–2	2–0	0–1	1–2	1–1
Pisa	2–0	1–0	0–0	2–2	2–3	2–1	4–0	4–0	1–2	0–0	0–0	0–1	2–0	2–0	0–0		1–0	1–0	0–1	0–1
Reggiana	1–1	2–2	2–2	0–0	0–0	0–0	0–0	0–0	1–0	1–0	3–1	1–1	3–1	1–2	0–1	1–1		3–1	0–0	0–2
Taranto	0–0	1–0	0–0	0–0	2–0	1–0	1–1	0–0	1–1	3–1	0–1	2–0	1–0	2–1	0–0	0–0	2–0		0–0	1–1
Udinese	1–0	1–1	4–0	0–2	2–2	2–1	2–2	1–1	0–0	1–0	3–0	0–0	1–0	2–1	2–1	0–1	1–0	2–0		0–0
Venezia	1–2	3–1	1–0	1–1	1–1	0–0	1–1	2–1	0–0	1–0	1–1	0–1	3–2	1–2	0–1	1–1	1–3	0–0	1–1	

Source: Almanacco Illustrato del Calcio - La Storia 1898-2004, Panini Edizioni, Modena, September 2005
Legend: Blue = home team win; Yellow = draw; Red = away team win.

== Relegation tie-breaker ==
20 June 1992

Casertana	1–2 (a.e.t.)	Taranto
Carbone 67'		Turrini 37'; Fresta 95'

Stadio Cino e Lillo Del Duca, Ascoli Piceno
Attendance: 8,000
Referee: Angelo Amendolia

Casertana relegated to Serie C1.

== Season tickets ==
The season ticket sales as they were before the beginning of the season:

Rank	Club	Tickets
1	Udinese	9.664
2	Bologna	8.976
3	Pescara	8.976
4	Avellino	5.882
5	Casertana	4.883
6	Palermo	4.664
7	Taranto	4.301
8	Pisa	3.458
9	Lucchese	3.274
10	Piacenza	2.573
11	Padova	1.963
12	Cremonese	1.776
13	Brescia	1.812
14	Cesena	1.761
15	Venezia	1.729
16	Lecce	1.596
17	Cosenza	1.586
18	Modena	1.427
19	Messina	1.353
20	Ancona	890

== Attendances ==
#	Club	Average
1	Bologna	18,086
2	Palermo	17,977
3	Pescara	16,402
4	Udinese	15,016
5	Brescia	11,797
6	Cosenza	10,930
7	Ancona	9,736
8	Reggiana	9,543
9	Lecce	9,010
10	Avellino	8,638
11	Padova	8,254
12	Taranto	8,223
13	Casertana	7,641
14	Cesena	7,387
15	Venezia	7,080
16	Pisa	7,068
17	Messina	6,389
18	Lucchese	5,998
19	Modena	5,423
20	Piacenza	5,226

== References and sources ==
- Almanacco Illustrato del Calcio - La Storia 1898-2004, Panini Edizioni, Modena, September 2005
