= Maurizio Ganz =

Italian football manager (born 1968)

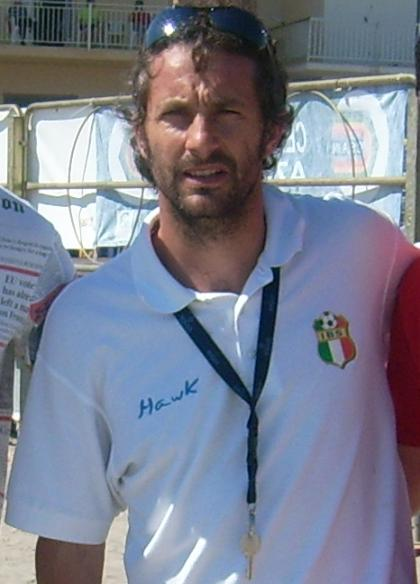
- Ganz in 2007

Personal information
- Date of birth: 13 October 1968 (age 58)
- Place of birth: Tolmezzo, Italy
- Height: 1.78 m (5 ft 10 in)
- Position: Striker

Youth career
- Sampdoria

Senior career*
Years	Team	Apps	(Gls)
1985–1988	Sampdoria	13	(0)
1988–1989	Monza	33	(9)
1989–1990	Parma	32	(5)
1990–1992	Brescia	70	(29)
1992–1995	Atalanta	76	(37)
1995–1997	Inter Milan	68	(26)
1998–2001	AC Milan	40	(9)
2000	→ Venezia (loan)	19	(8)
2000–2001	→ Atalanta (loan)	24	(5)
2001–2002	Fiorentina	15	(2)
2002–2004	Ancona	54	(14)
2004–2005	Modena	31	(4)
2005–2006	Lugano	23	(8)
2006–2007	Pro Vercelli	26	(10)
Total		524	(166)

International career
2009	Padania	2	(4)

Managerial career
- 2014–2016: Ascona
- 2016–2017: Bustese
- 2017–2018: Ascona
- 2018–2019: Taverne
- 2019–2023: AC Milan Women
- * Club domestic league appearances and goals

Maurizio Ganz (born 13 October 1968) is an Italian professional football coach and former player. He played as a striker.

== Club career ==
A Sampdoria youth product, Ganz started his professional career with the Sampdoria senior side in 1985, making his professional debut in Serie A on 14 September 1986; he won a Coppa Italia with the club in 1988. He later moved to Monza in Serie B during the 1988–89 season, before helping Parma to Serie A promotion from Serie B during the 1989–90 season. He spent two more seasons in Serie B and later played for Brescia, finishing the 1991–92 Serie B season as the top goalscorer, with 19 goals, and helping the club win the league title, earning promotion to Serie A. In the summer of 1992, he transferred to Atalanta, making his Serie A debut with the club and scoring 14 goals during his first season in the top division. He spent three seasons with the club, although Atalanta were relegated during his second season, and he passed his final season in Serie B.

Ganz transferred to Inter Milan in 1995, spending two seasons with the club; Ganz scored 36 goals from 68 appearances for the club, and was a feared goalscorer, earning the nickname "he always scores!" During his first season, he scored 13 goals in Serie A. The following season, he helped Inter to reach the final of the 1996–97 UEFA Cup, only to lose on penalties; he finished the tournament as the top goalscorer with eight goals. That season, he also helped Inter to a third-place finish in Serie A, scoring 11 goals, and he helped his club reach the semi-finals of the Coppa Italia, scoring a goal in the competition. In total, he scored ten goals in 16 appearances in European Competitions and three goals in 14 appearances in the Coppa Italia during his time at Inter. He scored twice in early stages of the 1997–98 UEFA Cup that Inter eventually won.

Ganz moved to local rivals AC Milan in December 1997, helping the club to the 1998 Coppa Italia final during his first season with the club. In his second season, he won the Scudetto with Milan and was very influential, scoring several important goals, including one against his former team Inter in a memorable 5–0 win in a Milan Derby cup tie. His third season was less successful, as Milan were defeated by Parma in the 1999 Supercoppa Italiana final. Ganz did not find much space in the squad that season, and spent a lot of his time on the bench, as Alberto Zaccheroni, the Milan manager at that time, had several other star offensive players, such as Oliver Bierhoff, George Weah, Andriy Shevchenko, Leonardo, and Zvonimir Boban.

During the second half of the 1999–2000 Serie A season, he went on loan to Venezia. He spent the first half of the 2000–01 season with Atalanta before eventually moving on to Fiorentina for the second half of the season, as a replacement for the injured Enrico Chiesa. He later played for two seasons with Ancona in Serie B, helping the club to gain Serie A promotion in 2003, for the first time in 11 years. He moved to Modena for the 2004–05 Serie B season, and later spent a single Lugano in the Swiss Challenge League, scoring 11 goals. He ended his career in 2007 with Pro Vercelli in Serie C2, scoring 10 goals. Ganz finished his career with an impressive record of 204 goals in 469 games.

== International career ==
Ganz represented Italy at the Under-17 World Cup in 1985. He received two call-ups for the Italian national team in 1993, but did not gain an international cap.

He played one game and scored a hat-trick for Padania, an unofficial national team that competes in the Viva World Cup.

== Coaching career ==
In 2014 Ganz was named head coach of Swiss club Ascona. A year later he successfully obtained his UEFA Pro coaching licence.

In 2016 Ganz took over at Lombardian Serie D amateur club Bustese, a role he occupied until January 2017.

After returning to Ascona and witnessing a relegation with his club, Ganz signed as head coach of fellow Swiss club Taverne in June 2018. He left Taverne after one year to return to AC Milan as the head coach of their women's team.

On 20 November 2023, Ganz was relieved of his duties in charge of AC Milan Women.

== Personal life ==
His son Simone Andrea (born 1993) is a forward who is currently part of Brindisi. He is of Austrian origin.

== Career statistics ==
=== Managerial ===
As of matches played 20 November 2023 (Note: Stats for league and European games only)

Managerial record by team and tenure
Team	From	To	Record								Ref
Team	From	To	G	W	D	L	GF	GA	GD	Win %	Ref
AC Milan Women	25 June 2019	20 November 2023	50	35	6	9	105	47	+58	70.00	
Career total			120	70	22	28	105	47	+58	58.33	

== Honours ==
Sampdoria

- Coppa Italia: 1987–88

Brescia

- Serie B: 1991–92

Inter Milan

- UEFA Cup: 1997–98

AC Milan

- Serie A: 1998–99

Individual

- Serie B top scorer: 1991–92
- UEFA Cup top scorer: 1996–97
