= Lorenzo Scarafoni =

Italian footballer and coach

Personal information
- Full name: Lorenzo Scarafoni
- Date of birth: December 4, 1965 (age 60)
- Place of birth: Ascoli Piceno, Marche, Italy
- Position: Forward

Senior career*
| Years | Team | Apps | (Gls) |
| 1981–1988 | Ascoli | 73 | (9) |
| 1988–1991 | Bari | 62 | (6) |
| 1990–1991 | → Triestina (loan) | 27 | (10) |
| 1991–1993 | Pisa | 71 | (21) |
| 1993–1995 | Cesena | 69 | (23) |
| 1995–1999 | Palermo | 57 | (15) |
| 1996–1997 | → Ancona (loan) | 14 | (3) |
| 1997 | → Ravenna (loan) | 9 | (1) |
| Total | | 382 | (88) |

International career
| 1987–1988 | Italy under-21 | 11 | (0) |

Managerial career
- 1999–2001: Fermana (U19)
- 2003–2004: Bologna (assistant)
- 2006: Livorno (assistant)
- 2006: Fidelis Andria
- 2007–2008: Avellino (director of sports)
- 2010: Centobuchi
- 2011–2012: Fermana
- * Club domestic league appearances and goals

Lorenzo Scarafoni (born 4 December 1965) is an Italian footballer. Following his retirement in 1999, he has worked as a coach.

== Playing career ==
=== Club ===
Scarafoni, who could play as either a forward or a winger, began his playing career in the 1981-82 season with his hometown club, Ascoli. He spent seven seasons with Ascoli, after which he had spells in both Serie A and Serie B with Bari, Pisa, Cesena and Palermo. His most prolific season was in 1993-94, when his 15 goals helped Cesena to the brink of promotion to Serie A–Cesena missed out on promotion after losing a play-off with Padova.

=== International ===
Scarafoni made 11 appearances for the Italy under-21s from 1987 to 1988. He made his debut on 28 January 1987 in a 1–0 win against East Germany. He took part in the 1988 UEFA European Under-21 Football Championship and was involved in both legs of Italy's quarter-final defeat to France.

== Coaching career ==
Following his retirement in 1999, Scarafoni worked as the youth-team coach of Fermana. He later worked as Carlo Mazzone's assistant at both Bologna and Livorno.
