= Fausto Pari =

Italian footballer

Personal information
- Date of birth: 15 September 1962 (age 64)
- Place of birth: Savignano sul Rubicone, Italy
- Height: 1.76 m (5 ft 9 in)
- Position: Defender

Senior career*
| Years | Team | Apps | (Gls) |
| 1978–1979 | Bellaria Igea | 27 | (4) |
| 1979–1981 | Inter Milan | 1 | (0) |
| 1981–1983 | Parma | 64 | (5) |
| 1983–1992 | Sampdoria | 273 | (7) |
| 1992–1996 | Napoli | 81 | (0) |
| 1996–1997 | Piacenza | 30 | (0) |
| 1997–1998 | SPAL | 33 | (1) |
| 1998–2000 | Modena | 64 | (1) |
| 2000–2001 | Forlì | 22 | (1) |
| Total | | 595 | (19) |
- * Club domestic league appearances and goals

Fausto Pari (born 15 September 1962 in Savignano sul Rubicone) is an Italian former professional footballer who played as a defender.

== Honours ==
Inter Milan

- Serie A: 1979–80 (on the squad, but did not play in any league games)

Sampdoria

- Serie A: 1990–91
- Coppa Italia: 1984–85, 1987–88, 1988–89
- Supercoppa Italiana: 1991
- UEFA Cup Winners' Cup: 1989–90
