= Antonio Paganin =

Italian footballer (born 1966)

Personal information
- Date of birth: 18 June 1966 (age 60)
- Place of birth: Vicenza, Italy
- Height: 1.82 m (6 ft 0 in)
- Position: Defender

Senior career*
Years	Team	Apps	(Gls)
1982–1984	Bologna	0	(0)
1984–1988	Sampdoria	46	(1)
1988–1990	Udinese	53	(1)
1990–1995	Internazionale	109	(0)
1995–1996	Atalanta	27	(0)
1996–1997	Verona	11	(0)
1997–1999	Torri Quartesolo		
1999–2003	Montecchio Maggiore		
- * Club domestic league appearances and goals

Antonio Paganin (born 18 June 1966) is an Italian former professional football player, who played as a defender. He is the brother of Massimo Paganin, who was also a football player.

== Career ==
Paganin was born in Vicenza. He began his career with Bologna (1982–1984) in the lower divisions, later moving to Serie A club Sampdoria (1984–88), and winning two Coppa Italia trophies during his time with the club. He moved to Udinese for two seasons (1988–90), helping the team to earn Serie A promotion, before moving to Internazionale (1990–95), where he won the UEFA Cup twice, in 1991 and in 1994. He later played with Atalanta (1995–96), and Verona (1996–97), where he concluded his Serie A career, before moving to Torri Quartesolo (1997–99), and later ending his career with Montecchio Maggiore (1999–2003), in the lower divisions.

== Honours ==
Inter

- UEFA Cup: 1990–91, 1993–94.

Sampdoria

- Coppa Italia: 1984–85, 1987–88.
