= 1983–84 Serie B =

Italian football league season

Serie B
- Season: 1983–84
- Champions: Atalanta; 4th title

Serie B 1983-84 team distribution

The Serie B 1983–84 was the fifty-second tournament of this competition played in Italy since its creation.

== Teams ==
Triestina, Padova, Empoli and Pescara had been promoted from Serie C, while Cagliari, Cesena and Catanzaro had been relegated from Serie A.

== Final classification ==
Pos	Team	Pld	W	D	L	GF	GA	GD	Pts	Promotion or relegation
1	Atalanta (P, C)	38	16	17	5	49	28	+21	49	Promotion to Serie A
2	Como (P)	38	17	14	7	41	26	+15	48	Promotion to Serie A
3	Cremonese (P)	38	15	15	8	44	29	+15	45	Promotion to Serie A
4	Lecce	38	13	16	9	33	28	+5	42	
5	Padova	38	11	18	9	34	28	+6	40	
5	Arezzo	38	12	16	10	34	33	+1	40	
5	Campobasso	38	13	14	11	31	31	0	40	
8	Perugia	38	9	20	9	33	30	+3	38	
8	Triestina	38	11	16	11	37	40	−3	38	
10	Varese	38	11	15	12	30	38	−8	37	
11	Cagliari	38	10	16	12	31	32	−1	36	
11	Pescara	38	13	10	15	41	48	−7	36	
13	Cesena	38	10	15	13	31	33	−2	35	
13	Sambenedettese	38	9	17	12	30	35	−5	35	
13	Monza	38	11	13	14	29	34	−5	35	
13	Empoli	38	8	19	11	27	34	−7	35	
17	Palermo (R)	38	9	16	13	30	32	−2	34	Relegation to Serie C1
18	Pistoiese (R)	38	12	10	16	27	34	−7	34	Relegation to Serie C1
19	Cavese (R)	38	8	17	13	25	33	−8	33	Relegation to Serie C1
20	Catanzaro (R)	38	10	10	18	34	45	−11	30	Relegation to Serie C1

Source: head-to-head points used in event of equal points in relegation zone.
(C) Champions; (P) Promoted; (R) Relegated

== Results ==
Home \ Away	ARE	ATA	CAG	CAM	CAT	CAV	CES	COM	CRE	EMP	LEC	MON	PAD	PAL	PER	PES	PIS	SAM	TRI	VAR
Arezzo	—	0–0	3–2	2–0	1–1	1–0	1–0	1–0	0–0	0–0	1–1	1–0	2–1	1–1	0–0	2–1	1–1	0–1	1–0	1–0
Atalanta	1–1	—	0–0	1–0	2–1	1–0	1–1	1–1	1–0	1–0	1–1	3–0	2–1	1–0	5–2	1–1	4–0	4–2	1–1	3–1
Cagliari	2–1	1–0	—	2–0	0–0	1–1	1–0	1–2	0–0	1–1	0–0	0–0	1–0	1–0	0–0	2–0	0–1	2–2	2–1	0–0
Campobasso	1–0	2–1	1–1	—	2–1	1–0	3–1	2–0	1–1	1–1	1–0	2–1	0–0	1–0	0–0	2–0	2–1	3–0	1–1	0–0
Catanzaro	2–1	0–3	1–1	1–0	—	0–0	1–0	2–2	1–0	1–0	0–1	0–0	0–0	2–1	1–1	4–3	0–0	2–1	0–1	1–2
Cavese	1–1	1–1	0–0	1–0	1–0	—	3–1	1–1	1–1	1–1	1–1	1–0	0–0	1–1	0–0	3–2	1–0	1–0	1–0	0–1
Cesena	2–2	0–1	0–0	1–1	1–0	2–0	—	1–1	1–1	2–0	2–2	3–1	0–0	2–1	2–0	2–0	1–0	1–0	2–2	1–0
Como	2–0	0–0	1–0	3–0	1–2	2–1	1–0	—	1–1	1–1	1–0	1–0	1–0	2–0	1–0	0–0	1–0	2–1	5–1	0–0
Cremonese	1–0	2–0	2–1	2–0	2–1	1–0	0–0	0–0	—	3–2	0–0	4–0	0–0	3–3	3–1	2–3	3–1	2–1	0–2	3–0
Empoli	1–4	0–0	1–0	0–0	1–0	0–0	1–0	1–2	1–0	—	2–1	1–1	1–1	0–0	1–1	1–1	1–0	1–1	0–0	2–1
Lecce	1–0	1–0	1–2	0–0	0–0	1–0	2–0	1–0	1–1	2–0	—	2–1	0–2	1–0	1–1	2–0	1–0	0–0	0–1	4–0
Monza	0–0	1–1	3–3	2–0	0–1	0–0	1–0	1–0	0–1	2–1	1–0	—	0–0	1–0	1–0	1–1	1–0	1–0	3–0	1–1
Padova	0–0	1–1	1–0	1–1	2–1	2–1	1–1	1–3	1–2	2–2	5–0	1–1	—	0–0	1–0	1–0	1–0	0–0	1–0	3–0
Palermo	1–1	2–0	1–1	1–0	1–0	0–0	0–0	0–0	0–0	1–0	1–1	2–0	0–1	—	1–1	5–0	2–0	1–0	0–3	2–1
Perugia	1–1	1–1	2–0	0–0	3–1	1–1	1–0	0–1	2–1	0–0	1–1	1–0	2–0	0–0	—	1–0	0–0	3–0	0–0	4–1
Pescara	3–1	0–0	0–1	2–1	3–2	3–1	2–1	2–0	1–0	1–2	0–0	0–0	1–0	3–1	1–1	—	2–0	1–1	0–0	1–0
Pistoiese	0–1	1–1	1–0	0–0	2–1	2–1	0–0	1–1	0–1	1–0	1–0	1–0	3–1	1–0	1–0	2–0	—	1–1	3–1	1–1
Samb.	2–0	1–1	1–0	2–0	2–1	2–0	0–0	0–0	1–0	1–0	1–2	1–0	0–0	1–1	0–0	0–1	1–1	—	0–0	1–1
Triestina	1–1	1–2	2–1	0–1	3–2	0–0	2–0	2–0	1–1	0–0	1–1	0–3	1–1	0–0	2–2	3–2	1–0	1–1	—	1–0
Varese	2–0	0–2	2–1	1–1	1–0	2–0	0–0	1–1	0–0	0–0	0–0	1–1	1–1	2–0	1–0	2–0	1–0	1–1	2–1	—

Legend: Blue = home team win; Yellow = draw; Red = away team win.

== Attendances ==
#	Club	Average
1	Atalanta	19,178
2	Padova	14,105
3	Cagliari	13,616
4	Triestina	13,040
5	Cremonese	12,001
6	Palermo	11,875
7	Perugia	9,660
8	Pescara	8,207
9	Lecce	8,164
10	Cesena	7,897
11	Pistoiese	7,786
12	Como	7,255
13	Arezzo	6,768
14	Cavese	6,296
15	Sambenedettese	6,287
16	Campobasso	6,076
17	Catanzaro	5,838
18	Empoli	4,677
19	Varese	4,631
20	Monza	4,195

== References and sources ==
- Almanacco Illustrato del Calcio - La Storia 1898-2004, Panini Edizioni, Modena, September 2005

Specific
