= Hans-Peter Briegel =

German footballer and manager

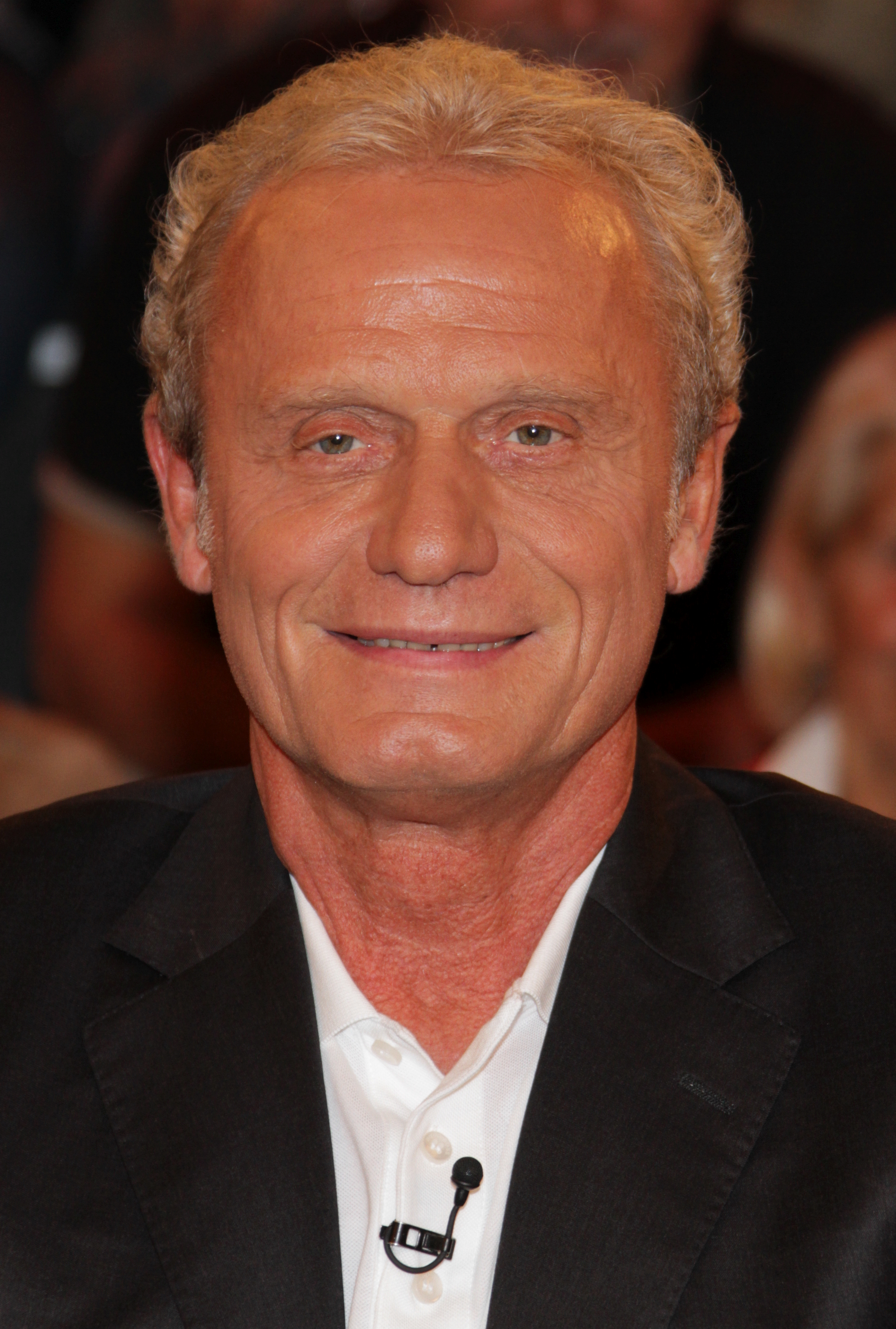
- Briegel in 2012

Personal information
- Full name: Hans-Peter Briegel
- Date of birth: 11 October 1955 (age 71)
- Place of birth: Rodenbach, West Germany
- Height: 1.88 m (6 ft 2 in)
- Positions: Left back; centre back; defensive midfielder

Youth career
- 1972–1974: SV Rodenbach
- 1974–1975: 1. FC Kaiserslautern

Senior career*
Years	Team	Apps	(Gls)
1975–1984	1. FC Kaiserslautern	240	(47)
1984–1986	Hellas Verona	55	(12)
1986–1988	Sampdoria	51	(9)
Total		346	(68)

International career
1976–1978	West Germany Amateur	6	(0)
1978–1979	West Germany B	2	(1)
1979–1986	West Germany	72	(4)

Managerial career
- 1989–1992: FC Glarus
- 1992–1994: SV Edenkoben
- 1994–1995: SG Wattenscheid 09
- 1999–2000: Beşiktaş
- 2001–2002: Trabzonspor
- 2002–2006: Albania
- 2006–2007: Bahrain
- 2007: Ankaragücü
Medal record
Representing West Germany
UEFA European Championship
Winner	1980 Italy
- * Club domestic league appearances and goals

Hans-Peter Briegel (born 11 October 1955) is a German former professional football player and manager who played as a defender or midfielder.

One of the most popular German players in his days, Briegel's original sport was athletics, being successful in various events such as long jump (personal best: 7 metres 44 cm, aged 16), triple jump and specifically in heptathlon-forerunner pentathlon. Briegel also ran 100 metres in 10.8 seconds (officially; hand-timed), aged 16. At the age of 17, he left athletics behind him, playing club football with hometown side SV Rodenbach near Kaiserslautern. During his playing days, Briegel usually played as a left back and defensive midfielder. He was known primarily for his physical, technical and goal scoring abilities for a defensive player.

== Club career ==
Two years after that he was picked up by Erich Ribbeck and Ribbeck took him to training with 1. FC Kaiserslautern. Ribbeck was aware that Briegel struggled to combine football need with his physical power and presence, but Briegel was improving. Failing to cope the needs as striker, he did a better as defender. On 10 April 1976, Ribbeck brought him on as a sub in a 4–3 win over FC Bayern Munich. Until 1984 he stayed with local side 1. FC Kaiserslautern before he moved on to Hellas Verona in Italy. He built reputation and importance in the Italian Serie A, largely seen as one of the most technical in Europe. Briegel captured the Serie A title in 1985 with the Gialloblu. The same year, Briegel was named Fußballer des Jahres (Footballer of the Year) in Germany,

Subsequent to the end of his contract at Hellas Verona, Briegel changed clubs to join fellow Italian top division outfit U.C. Sampdoria of Genoa with whom he won the Coppa Italia before his retirement as a player in 1988. Hans-Peter Briegel's success in football, based on his physical constitution, his speed and his tireless running, made him the clearest symbol for the soldier-like reputation of German football in between the years. His nickname Die Walz von der Pfalz (literally "The steamroller from Palatinate") is referring to both, his playing style as well as to his origin. Briegel, who scored 47 goals in 240 Bundesliga matches, was a keen proponent of the idea of playing without shin pads and did not wear any in his career.

== International career ==
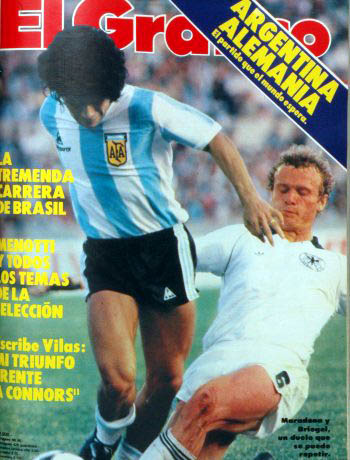
Briegel on the cover of El Gráfico tackling Maradona in 1982.

A Euro 1980 qualifying fixture against Wales in October 1979 gave Briegel his first chance to shine for West Germany and he did, enjoying his final breakthrough for his country in the mentioned tournament from which they emerged victorious. He was, then, part of the runner-up campaign of West Germany at the 1982 FIFA World Cup and featured alike in the less successful Euro 1984, all under the coaching of Jupp Derwall.

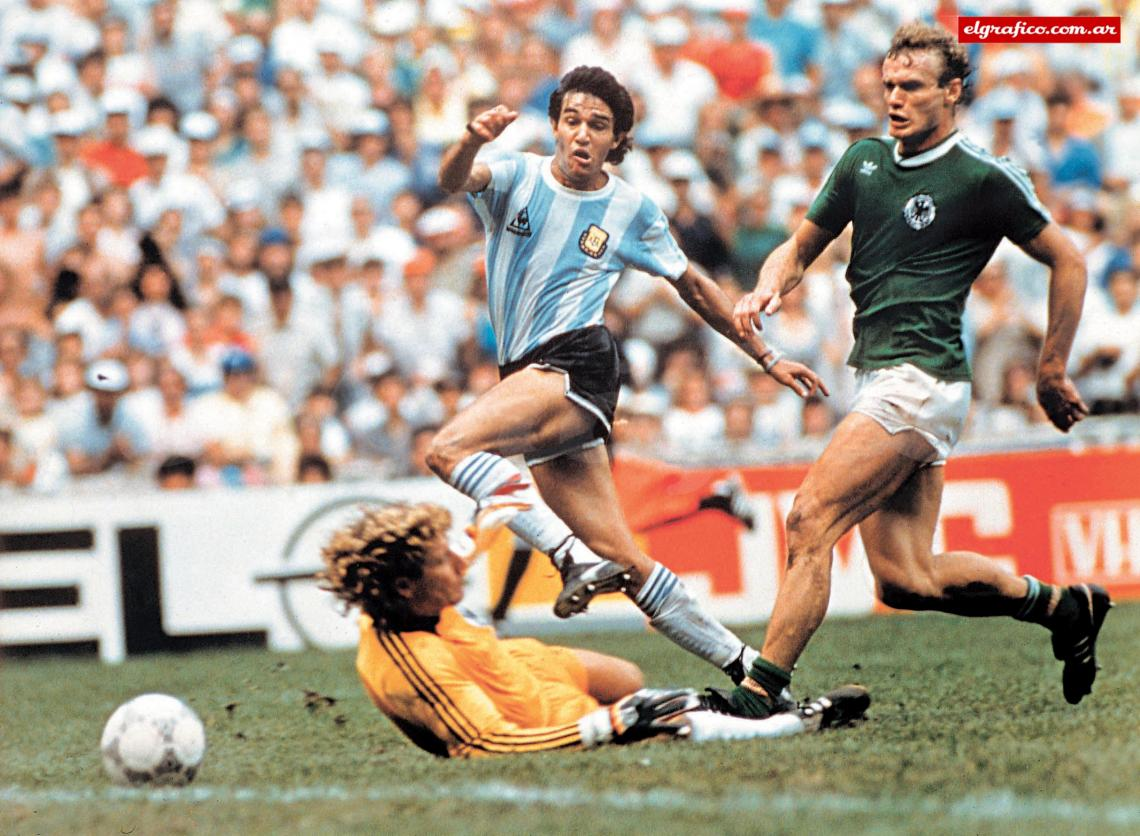
Briegel (right) against Argentina at the 1986 World Cup final

In the 1982 World Cup final, he was responsible for conceding a penalty early in the game by fouling Bruno Conti. Luckily, the penalty was missed but it did not save West Germany from losing the final. Derwall's successor Franz Beckenbauer kept him in his squads and, so, Briegel was able to take part in his second successive World Cup in Mexico in 1986. He was a regular, still, but finally the key to Argentina's winning goal in the final. Three minutes past Rudi Völler's equaliser and seven minutes short of the proposed extra-time, Briegel was, alongside his defending colleagues, hovering near the centre circle of the Estadio Azteca pitch on 29 June when Diego Maradona's pass was going to get on its way to striker Jorge Burruchaga. With his teammates aware, all moving forward quickly before that pass happened (to put the Argentinian striker offside), Briegel's hesitation worked as backfire for the West Germans, giving Burruchaga the chance to pounce decisively on them. Power-house Briegel tried to catch Burruchaga up in an attempt to dispossess him, indeed, but Burruchaga game-winning shot happened before Briegel's desperate tackle came to happen. With Beckenbauer not a true fan of his way of playing and him not having any intention to stand in the way of the coach to build a new team ahead of Euro 1988, to be held in West Germany, the tall defender quit Die Nationalmannschaft with this, his 72nd, appearance.

== Managerial career ==
His first job in coaching Briegel did at FC Glarus, a second-tier club from Switzerland. He then took the ropes of German lower league side SV Edenkoben before he was given the role of manager at then relegated Bundesliga side SG Wattenscheid 09 in 1994, a stay that didn't work out well. As a consequence he turned his back on coaching, re-joining 1. FC Kaiserslautern as sporting director in 1996. He resigned from that job in October 1997 following a hefty question of authority with the team's manager, Otto Rehhagel. He, later on, returned as a director to the club, a decision that saw him being involved in a financial scandal.

He accepted the offer of the Football Association of Albania to become head coach of Albania in December 2002. Before accepting the role Briegel had had various other job offers as his coaching experience, however limited, had been that of assistant to Karl-Heinz Feldkamp at Beşiktaş J.K. in Turkey, and the successor of Feldkamp at Beşiktaş J.K. (from September 1999 to 30 June 2000) and further on top of coaching at fellow Turkish Super League team Trabzonspor (7 November 2001 – 30 June 2002). However, he went ahead and accepted the Albania job with very much success for four years (2002–2006). To date he is the most successful coach of Albania of all times because of the number of points per match in the two qualifiers UEFA Euro 2004 Qualifications and the FIFA World Cup 2006 Qualification. He resigned from the role on 9 May 2006, after the extension of the contract offered him by the Albanian Federation was linked to the results that would be obtained.

In June 2006, he agreed to a deal with the Football Association of Bahrain, taking over the Bahrain squad from Luka Peruzović. However, he was dismissed on 20 January 2007 during the 2007 Gulf Cup.

Briegel's most recent engagement was coaching Turkish Super League side Ankaragücü, before leaving his post by the end of the 2006–07 season.

== Career statistics ==
=== Club ===
Appearances and goals by club, season and competition
Club	Season	League			National cup		League cup		Continental		Total	
Club	Season	Division	Apps	Goals	Apps	Goals	Apps	Goals	Apps	Goals	Apps	Goals
1. FC Kaiserslautern	1975–76	Bundesliga	7	1								
1. FC Kaiserslautern	1976–77	Bundesliga	15	1								
1. FC Kaiserslautern	1977–78	Bundesliga	22	4								
1. FC Kaiserslautern	1978–79	Bundesliga	31	4								
1. FC Kaiserslautern	1979–80	Bundesliga	33	7								
1. FC Kaiserslautern	1980–81	Bundesliga	34	6								
1. FC Kaiserslautern	1981–82	Bundesliga	32	13								
1. FC Kaiserslautern	1982–83	Bundesliga	33	8								
1. FC Kaiserslautern	1983–84	Bundesliga	33	3								
1. FC Kaiserslautern	Total		240	47								
Hellas Verona	1984–85	Serie A	27	9								
Hellas Verona	1985–86	Serie A	28	3								
Hellas Verona	Total		55	12								
Sampdoria	1986–87	Serie A	24	6								
Sampdoria	1987–88	Serie A	27	3								
Sampdoria	Total		51	9								
Career total			346	68								

=== International ===
Scores and results list West Germany's goal tally first, score column indicates score after each Briegel goal.

List of international goals scored by Hans-Peter Briegel
No.	Date	Venue	Opponent	Score	Result	Competition
1	19 November 1980	Niedersachsenstadion, Hanover, West Germany	France	2–0	4–1	Friendly
2	24 May 1981	Keskusurheilukenttä, Lahti, Finland	Finland	1–0	4–0	1982 World Cup qualifier
3	22 May 1984	Letzigrund, Zürich, Switzerland	Italy	1–0	1–0	Friendly
4	12 March 1986	Waldstadion, Frankfurt, West Germany	Brazil	1–0	2–0	Friendly

== Managerial statistics ==
As of 8 September 2014

Team	From	To	Record				
Team	From	To	G	W	D	L	Win %
Albania	29 March 2003	22 March 2006	30	10	4	16	33.33

== Honours ==
Verona

- Serie A: 1984–85

Sampdoria

- Coppa Italia: 1987–88

West Germany

- UEFA European Championship: 1980
- FIFA World Cup runners up: 1982, 1986

Individual

- kicker Bundesliga Team of the Season: 1979–80, 1980–81, 1981–82, 1982–83
- UEFA European Championship Team of the Tournament: 1980
- Onze Mondial: 1980, 1984, 1985
- Footballer of the Year (Germany): 1985
