= Fausto Salsano =

Italian footballer and manager

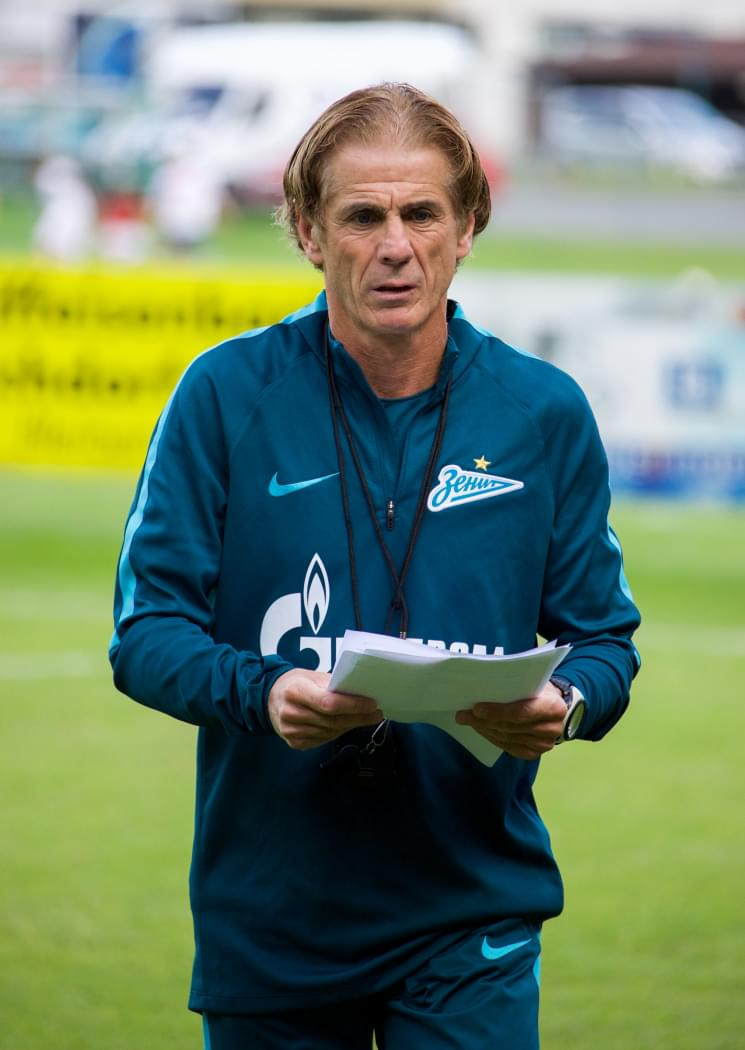
- Salsano with Zenit Saint Petersburg

Personal information
- Date of birth: 19 December 1962 (age 63)
- Place of birth: Cava de' Tirreni, Italy
- Height: 1.67 m (5 ft 6 in)
- Position: Midfielder

Youth career
- Pistoiese

Senior career*
Years	Team	Apps	(Gls)
1979–1990	Sampdoria	172	(15)
1981–1982	→ Empoli (loan)	23	(3)
1982–1984	→ Parma (loan)	61	(5)
1990–1993	Roma	74	(5)
1993–1998	Sampdoria	105	(1)
1998–2000	Spezia Calcio	32	(5)
2000	Sestrese	?	(?)
2000	Imperia	?	(?)

Managerial career
- 2000: Imperia
- 2002: Catania (assistant)
- 2002: Fiorentina (assistant)
- 2004–2008: Inter Milan (assistant)
- 2009–2013: Manchester City (assistant)
- 2013–2014: Galatasaray (assistant)
- 2014–2016: Inter Milan (assistant)
- 2017–2018: Zenit Saint Petersburg (assistant)
- 2018–2023: Italy (assistant)
- 2023–: Saudi Arabia (technical coach)
- * Club domestic league appearances and goals

Fausto Salsano (born 19 December 1962) is an Italian football manager and former player, who played as a midfielder. He most recently served as a technical coach for the Saudi Arabia national team.

== Honours ==
Sampdoria

- Coppa Italia: 1984–85, 1987–88, 1988–89, 1993–94
- UEFA Cup Winners' Cup: 1989–90

Roma

- Coppa Italia: 1990–91
