= Pietro Vierchowod =

Italian footballer (born 1959)

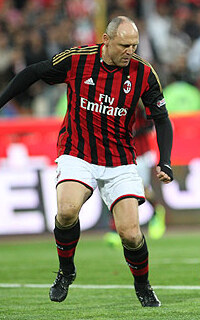
- Vierchowod in 2013

Personal information
- Full name: Pietro Vierchowod
- Date of birth: 6 April 1959 (age 67)
- Place of birth: Calcinate, Italy
- Height: 1.79 m (5 ft 10 in)
- Position: Centre-back

Youth career
- 1973–1976: Romanese

Senior career*
Years	Team	Apps	(Gls)
1976–1981	Como	115	(6)
1981–1982	Fiorentina	28	(2)
1982–1983	Roma	30	(0)
1983–1995	Sampdoria	358	(25)
1995–1996	Juventus	21	(2)
1996–1997	AC Milan	16	(1)
1997–2000	Piacenza	79	(6)
Total		647	(42)

International career
1981–1993	Italy	45	(2)

Managerial career
- 2001: Catania
- 2002: Florentia Viola
- 2005: Triestina
- 2014: Budapest Honvéd
- 2018: Kamza
Medal record
Men's football
Representing Italy
FIFA World Cup
Winner	1982 Spain
Third place	1990 Italy
- * Club domestic league appearances and goals

Pietro Vierchowod Ufficiale OMRI (Ukrainian: П’єтро Верховод, romanized: P'etro Verkhovod, born 6 April 1959) is an Italian former professional footballer who played as a centre-back, and a manager. He represented the Italy national side during his career and was in the Italian squad that won the 1982 FIFA World Cup.

Widely regarded as one of the greatest Italian centre-backs of all-time, and one of the best of his generation, during his playing career he was nicknamed lo Zar ("the Tsar") because of his pace, defensive ability, physicality, tenacious playing style, and Ukrainian descent; he was the son of a Ukrainian Red Army soldier from Starobilsk.

== Early life ==
Vierchowod was born in Calcinate, in the province of Bergamo. He is the son of a former Soviet prisoner of war. His father, Ivan Lukyanovych Verkhovod (Ukrainian: Іван Лук’янович Верховод), a Ukrainian, was taken prisoner during World War II, escaped from a Nazi concentration camp in northern Italy, and fought in a partisan detachment of the Italian Resistance. After the war he did not return to the USSR and settled in Lombardy.

== Club career ==
Vierchowod was initially a man-marking centre-back, who also later excelled in a zonal-marking system. He started his professional football career for Como, before moving to Fiorentina. However, his first successes came when he moved to Roma, winning a Serie A scudetto in 1983. Then he moved to Sampdoria, with whom he won four Italian Cups, one European Cup Winners' Cup and another scudetto in 1991. In 1995, Vierchowod signed for Juventus, where he acted as an experienced defender and won his only UEFA Champions League in 1996 at the age of 37. He played the final in Rome against Ajax which Juve won on penalties.

Vierchowod then moved on to AC Milan and Piacenza, for whom he continued to play regularly until his early 40s. In the 1998–99 season, Vierchowod scored three goals in the last ten Serie A matchdays to help Piacenza win six out of the last ten league games, which was crucial in securing survival; his second goal was scored on 3 April 1999, just three days before his 40th birthday, in a 4–3 win over Udinese, and his third goal came in the final matchday, on 23 May, when Vierchowod, at the age of 40 years and 47 days, scored in a 1–1 draw against Salernitana, thus becoming the second 40-year-old player to score a Serie A goal after Silvio Piola, and currently sitting as the fifth oldest Serie A goalscorer behind Zlatan Ibrahimović, Alessandro Costacurta, Piola, and Fabio Quagliarella.

He eventually retired in 2000, aged 41. Vierchowod played 562 Serie A matches, and is the seventh-highest appearance holder of all time in Serie A, behind only to Paolo Maldini, Gianluigi Buffon, Francesco Totti, Javier Zanetti, Gianluca Pagliuca, and Dino Zoff.

== International career ==
Vierchowod was capped 45 times with the Italy national team between 1981 and 1993, scoring two goals. He made his international debut on 6 January 1981, at the age of 21, during a 1–1 friendly draw against the Netherlands in Montevideo, in the 1981 "Mundialito" tournament. He was one of the players in the Italian squad, although he did not play, that won the 1982 FIFA World Cup, under manager Enzo Bearzot. Vierchowod was a member of the Italian squad that took part at the 1986 FIFA World Cup and he also made three appearances at the 1990 FIFA World Cup, as Italy finished in third place on home soil, under manager Azeglio Vicini, after reaching the semi-finals. He is also the oldest goalscorer in the history of the Italy national team: he scored in a 1994 FIFA World Cup qualification match against Malta on 24 March 1993, which ended in a 6–1 win for the Azzurri, under manager Arrigo Sacchi. Vierchowod also competed for Italy at the 1984 Summer Olympic Games, where Italy managed a fourth-place finish, after reaching the semi-finals of the tournament, although he has never played for Italy in a UEFA European Championship.

== Style of play ==
Nicknamed lo Zar, Vierchowod was a tenacious and physical left-footed centre-back, who possessed great pace; regarded as one of Italy's best ever defenders, during his career, he was considered one of the fastest defenders in the world, and one of the toughest Serie A defenders of the 1980s and the 1990s, due to his immense strength, tight marking of opponents, and hard tackling style of play. Usually deployed as a man-marking "stopper" in his early career, functioning as a more defensive-minded foil for a sweeper, his speed, powerful physique, anticipation, positional sense, decisiveness in his challenges, and ability to read the game enabled him to break down opposing plays, win back possession, and intercept loose balls; these attributes, also allowed him to excel in the zonal marking defensive system during his later career. Although he was initially not the most refined or technically gifted defender in his youth, as his career progressed, he showed significant technical and tactical improvements. While he was not particularly tall for a centre-back, he was also very strong in the air, due to his elevation, and had a penchant for scoring goals from headers; as a result he is one of the most prolific Italian defenders of all time. Despite his aggressive playing style, he was also regarded as a fair player both on and off the pitch, and also stood out for his longevity, leadership, dedication in training, and ability to avoid injuries.

In a 2008 interview with Argentine magazine El Gráfico, Argentine footballer Diego Maradona, widely regarded as one of the greatest players of all time, dubbed Vierchowod his toughest opponent, stating that "[Vierchowod] was an animal, he had muscles to the eyelashes. It was easy to pass by him, but then when I raised my head, he was in front of me again. I would have to pass him two or three more times and then I would pass the ball because I couldn't stand him anymore". Throughout his career, Maradona gave Vierchowod the nickname Hulk.

Gary Lineker also revealed in an interview with FourFourTwo that Vierchowod was "the hardest defender he ever faced" adding "he was absolutely brutal and lightning quick. He gave me one or two digs."

Marco van Basten named Pietro Vierchowod and Riccardo Ferri as two of the best defenders he ever faced, while Gabriel Batistuta described Vierchowod as the best defender in the world in 1992.

== Coaching career ==
After his playing career, Vierchowod coached Catania of Serie C1, Florentia Viola (now Fiorentina) of Serie C2 and Triestina of Serie B. In all of the circumstances, he left before the end of the season.

On 13 June 2014, Vierchowod was announced as the new coach of the Hungarian club, Budapest Honvéd, but after the team's poor performance and the lack of company support, he resigned on 6 October.

He then briefly served as head coach of FC Kamza between June and July 2018, He left the company because of issues with the management.

== Honours ==
Roma

- Serie A: 1982–83

Sampdoria

- Serie A: 1990–91
- Coppa Italia: 1984–85, 1987–88, 1988–89, 1993–94
- European Cup Winners' Cup: 1989–90
- Supercoppa Italiana: 1991

Juventus

- Supercoppa Italiana: 1995
- UEFA Champions League: 1995–96

Italy

- FIFA World Cup: 1982
- Scania 100 Tournament: 1991

Individual

- Serie A Team of The Year: 1983, 1985, 1988, 1990, 1991
- Guerin d'Oro: 1983
- Premio Nazionale Carriera Esemplare "Gaetano Scirea": 1995

Orders

- 4th Class / Officer: Ufficiale Ordine al Merito della Repubblica Italiana: 1991
