= Enzo Gambaro =

Italian footballer (born 1966)

Personal information
- Date of birth: 23 February 1966 (age 60)
- Place of birth: Genoa, Italy
- Height: 6 ft 0 in (1.83 m)
- Position: Defender

Senior career*
Years	Team	Apps	(Gls)
1984–1985	Sampdoria	2	(0)
1985–1986	A.C. Prato	33	(0)
1986–1987	Sampdoria	16	(0)
1987–1991	Parma F.C.	132	(4)
1991–1993	A.C. Milan	16	(0)
1993–1994	Napoli	33	(1)
1994–1995	Reggiana	17	(0)
1995	Fiorentina	2	(0)
1995–1996	Bolton Wanderers	0	(0)
1996	Grimsby Town	1	(0)
1996–1997	Sturm Graz	13	(1)
1997–1999	Triestina	28	(0)
Total		293	(6)

Managerial career
- 2016: Brera
- * Club domestic league appearances and goals

Enzo Gambaro (born 23 February 1966) is an Italian former professional footballer who played as a defender.

Gambaro was a part of the Parma team that won promotion to Serie A, and played for Sampdoria before joining A.C. Milan in 1991. He briefly had a stint in England, firstly with Bolton Wanderers and then Grimsby Town, before moving to Austria with Sturm Graz.

== Managerial career ==
On the 16 June 2016 Gambaro was announced new head coach of Milan–based football club Brera.
