= 1987–88 Coppa Italia =

Tournament details
- Country: Italy
- Dates: 23 Aug 1987 – 19 May 1988
- Teams: 48

Final positions
- Champions: Sampdoria (2nd title)
- Runners-up: Torino

Tournament statistics
- Matches played: 150
- Goals scored: 354 (2.36 per match)
- Top goal scorer: Diego Maradona (6 goals)

The 1987–88 Coppa Italia was the 41st Coppa Italia, the major Italian domestic football cup. The competition was won by Sampdoria, who defeated Torino 3–2 on aggregate in a two-legged final played at Stadio Luigi Ferraris in Genoa and Stadio Comunale in Turin.

== Group stage ==
For this event changes were made to the regulations concerning the elimination rounds: 3 points for the winner, 2 points for the winner of penalty kicks, 1 point for the loser of penalty kicks.

=== Group 1 ===
Pos	Team	Pld	W	PKW	PKL	L	GF	GA	GD	Pts
1	Bologna	5	3	0	2	0	8	3	+5	11
2	Hellas Verona	5	3	1	0	1	12	8	+4	11
3	Cesena	5	3	0	1	1	10	6	+4	10
4	Messina	5	2	1	0	2	6	5	+1	8
5	Campobasso	5	1	0	0	4	3	10	−7	3
6	SPAL	5	0	1	0	4	3	10	−7	2

=== Group 2 ===
Pos	Team	Pld	W	PKW	PKL	L	GF	GA	GD	Pts
1	Parma	5	3	2	0	0	9	5	+4	13
2	Milan	5	3	1	1	0	12	4	+8	12
3	Como	5	3	0	0	2	8	5	+3	9
4	Bari	5	2	0	1	2	2	6	−4	7
5	Barletta	5	0	1	1	3	3	6	−3	3
6	Monza	5	0	0	1	4	3	11	−8	1

=== Group 3 ===
Pos	Team	Pld	W	PKW	PKL	L	GF	GA	GD	Pts
1	Internazionale	5	1	2	2	0	8	5	+3	9
2	Ascoli	5	2	1	1	1	5	3	+2	9
3	Taranto	5	2	1	0	2	6	9	−3	8
4	Reggiana	5	2	0	1	2	7	6	+1	7
5	Catania	5	2	0	1	2	5	8	−3	7
6	Brescia	5	1	1	0	3	6	6	0	5

=== Group 4 ===
Pos	Team	Pld	W	PKW	PKL	L	GF	GA	GD	Pts
1	Avellino	5	3	1	0	1	7	4	+3	11
2	Empoli	5	3	0	1	1	9	6	+3	10
3	Piacenza	5	2	1	0	2	8	8	0	8
4	Cremonese	5	1	1	2	1	8	8	0	7
5	Sambenedettese	5	1	1	1	2	4	7	−3	6
6	Centese	5	0	1	1	3	1	4	−3	3

=== Group 5 ===
Pos	Team	Pld	W	PKW	PKL	L	GF	GA	GD	Pts
1	Napoli	5	5	0	0	0	11	1	+10	15
2	Fiorentina	5	4	0	0	1	8	3	+5	12
3	Livorno	5	2	0	1	2	5	6	−1	7
4	Udinese	5	1	1	0	3	4	6	−2	5
5	Padova	5	0	1	2	2	2	4	−2	4
6	Modena	5	0	1	0	4	1	11	−10	2

=== Group 6 ===
Pos	Team	Pld	W	PKW	PKL	L	GF	GA	GD	Pts
1	Pescara	5	4	0	1	0	13	4	+9	13
2	Roma	5	3	2	0	0	6	2	+4	13
3	Monopoli	5	1	1	1	2	5	7	−2	6
4	Genoa	5	2	0	0	3	5	9	−4	6
5	Triestina	5	1	1	0	3	5	7	−2	5
6	Cagliari	5	0	0	2	3	2	7	−5	2

=== Group 7 ===
Pos	Team	Pld	W	PKW	PKL	L	GF	GA	GD	Pts
1	Sampdoria	5	5	0	0	0	10	1	+9	15
2	Torino	5	4	0	0	1	9	4	+5	12
3	Atalanta	5	2	0	1	2	6	6	0	7
4	Vicenza	5	1	0	1	3	4	7	−3	4
5	Cosenza	5	0	2	0	3	3	7	−4	4
6	Arezzo	5	0	1	1	3	2	9	−7	3

=== Group 8 ===
Pos	Team	Pld	W	PKW	PKL	L	GF	GA	GD	Pts
1	Pisa	5	3	0	2	0	5	2	+3	11
2	Juventus	5	2	2	0	1	8	3	+5	10
3	Lazio	5	2	1	1	1	4	6	−2	9
4	Lecce	5	1	2	0	2	4	6	−2	7
5	Catanzaro	5	1	0	1	3	6	6	0	4
6	Casertana	5	1	0	1	3	1	5	−4	4

== Round of 16 ==
Team 1	Agg.	Team 2	1st leg	2nd leg
Bologna	1-6	Internazionale	1-3	0-3
Empoli	2-1	Roma	2-1	0-0
Juventus	7-2	Pescara	1-0	6-2
Milan	1-1 (p: 3–4)	Ascoli	0-1	1-0
Napoli	5-4	Fiorentina	2-3	3-1
Parma	0-2	Avellino	0-0	0-2
Pisa	2-3	Sampdoria	2-1	0-2
Hellas Verona	1-1 (p: 1–4)	Torino	1-0	0-1

== Quarter-finals ==
Team 1	Agg.	Team 2	1st leg	2nd leg
Avellino	1-2	Juventus	1-1	0-1
Internazionale	3-1	Empoli	2-1	1-0
Sampdoria	5-3	Ascoli	4-2	1-1
Torino	4-3	Napoli	1-1	3-2

== Semi-finals ==
Team 1	Agg.	Team 2	1st leg	2nd leg
Internazionale	0-1	Sampdoria	0-0	0-1
Torino	3-2	Juventus	2-0	1-2

== Final ==
=== First leg ===
5 May 1988
21:00

Sampdoria	2–0	Torino
Briegel 10'; Vialli 33'

Stadio Luigi Ferraris, Genoa
Attendance: 18,000
Referee: Paolo Casarin

=== Second leg ===
19 May 1988
21:00

Torino	2–1 (a.e.t.)	Sampdoria
Vierchowod 5' (o.g.); A. Paganin 35' (o.g.)		Salsano 112'

Stadio Comunale, Turin
Attendance: 33,000
Referee: Luigi Agnolin

Sampdoria won 3–2 on aggregate.

== Top goalscorers ==
Rank	Player	Club	Goals
1	(Argentina) Diego Maradona	Napoli	6
2	(Brazil) Careca	Napoli	5
2	(Socialist Federal Republic of Yugoslavia) Blaž Slišković	Pescara	5
2	(Italy) Alessandro Altobelli	Internazionale	5
2	(Austria) Toni Polster	Torino	5
2	(Italy) Tullio Gritti	Torino	5
2	(Netherlands) Marco van Basten	Milan	5
2	(Wales) Ian Rush	Juventus	5
2	(Argentina) Ramón Díaz	Fiorentina	5
10	(Italy) Luigi De Agostini	Juventus	4
10	(Italy) Ruggiero Rizzitelli	Cesena	4
10	(Brazil) Júnior	Pescara	4
