= 1984–85 Coppa Italia =

Tournament details
- Country: Italy
- Dates: 22 Aug 1984 – 3 July 1985
- Teams: 48

Final positions
- Champions: Sampdoria (1st title)
- Runners-up: Milan

Tournament statistics
- Matches played: 150
- Goals scored: 352 (2.35 per match)
- Top goal scorer: Trevor Francis (9 goals)

The 1984–85 Coppa Italia was the 38th edition of the Coppa Italia tournament. Sampdoria defeated Milan in the final for their first cup title. The first stage of the tournament consisted of eight groups of six teams. The top two teams from each group advanced to the knockout stage. Every round of the knockout stage was contested over two legs.

== Group stage ==
=== Group 1 ===
Pos	Team	Pld	W	D	L	GF	GA	GD	Pts
1	Milan	5	2	3	0	6	3	+3	7
2	Parma	5	2	2	1	4	3	+1	6
3	Triestina	5	2	2	1	3	4	−1	6
4	Como	5	2	1	2	6	4	+2	5
5	Carrarese	5	1	1	3	5	7	−2	3
6	Brescia	5	0	3	2	4	7	−3	3

=== Group 2 ===
Pos	Team	Pld	W	D	L	GF	GA	GD	Pts
1	Internazionale	5	4	1	0	9	1	+8	9
2	Pisa	5	2	3	0	9	5	+4	7
3	Avellino	5	2	2	1	4	4	0	6
4	Bologna	5	1	2	2	4	5	−1	4
5	Francavilla	5	0	2	3	5	9	−4	2
6	SPAL	5	0	2	3	4	11	−7	2

=== Group 3 ===
Pos	Team	Pld	W	D	L	GF	GA	GD	Pts
1	Roma	5	3	2	0	8	2	+6	8
2	Genoa	5	2	2	1	7	4	+3	6
3	Lazio	5	2	2	1	8	6	+2	6
4	Varese	5	0	5	0	2	2	0	5
5	Padova	5	1	2	2	3	5	−2	4
6	Pistoiese	5	0	1	4	1	10	−9	1

=== Group 4 ===
Pos	Team	Pld	W	D	L	GF	GA	GD	Pts
1	Empoli	5	3	1	1	8	5	+3	7
2	Torino	5	2	3	0	4	1	+3	7
3	Cesena	5	1	2	2	5	5	0	4
4	Vicenza	5	1	2	2	6	7	−1	4
5	Monza	5	1	2	2	4	6	−2	4
6	Cremonese	5	1	2	2	6	9	−3	4

=== Group 5 ===
Pos	Team	Pld	W	D	L	GF	GA	GD	Pts
1	Hellas Verona	5	4	1	0	13	4	+9	9
2	Campobasso	5	2	2	1	7	4	+3	6
3	Ascoli	5	2	1	2	4	4	0	5
4	Benevento	5	2	1	2	6	8	−2	5
5	Casarano	5	1	1	3	2	8	−6	3
6	Catania	5	1	0	4	3	7	−4	2

=== Group 6 ===
Pos	Team	Pld	W	D	L	GF	GA	GD	Pts
1	Sampdoria	5	3	2	0	17	6	+11	8
2	Bari	5	3	1	1	10	4	+6	7
3	Catanzaro	5	3	1	1	8	6	+2	7
4	Udinese	5	2	1	2	10	8	+2	5
5	Lecce	5	1	1	3	10	9	+1	3
6	Cavese	5	0	0	5	2	24	−22	0

=== Group 7 ===
Pos	Team	Pld	W	D	L	GF	GA	GD	Pts
1	Juventus	5	4	1	0	17	2	+15	9
2	Cagliari	5	3	0	2	7	6	+1	6
3	Atalanta	5	1	4	0	6	5	+1	6
4	Taranto	5	1	2	2	5	6	−1	4
5	Palermo	5	1	1	3	4	11	−7	3
6	Sambenedettese	5	0	2	3	1	10	−9	2

=== Group 8 ===
Pos	Team	Pld	W	D	L	GF	GA	GD	Pts
1	Fiorentina	5	3	2	0	11	2	+9	8
2	Napoli	5	3	2	0	11	2	+9	8
3	Arezzo	5	2	1	2	4	7	−3	5
4	Pescara	5	1	2	2	4	7	−3	4
5	Casertana	5	1	2	2	2	5	−3	4
6	Perugia	5	0	1	4	0	9	−9	1

== Knockout stage ==
Round of 16
Genoa	0	1	1
Hellas Verona	1	2	3
Empoli	0	0	0
Internazionale	1	1	2
Milan	2	1	3
Napoli	1	1	2
Campobasso	1	1	2
Juventus	0	4	4
Parma (a)	0	1	1
Roma	0	1	1
Fiorentina	4	1	5
Bari	0	0	0
Torino	1	0	1
Cagliari	0	0	0
Pisa	1	0	1
Sampdoria	2	2	4

Quarter-finals
Hellas Verona	3	1	4
Internazionale	0	5	5
Milan (a)	0	1	1
Juventus	0	1	1
Parma	1	0	1
Fiorentina	0	3	3
Torino	0	2	2
Sampdoria	0	4	4

Semi-finals
Internazionale	1	1	2
Milan	2	1	3
Fiorentina	0	1	1
Sampdoria	0	3	3

Final
Milan	0	1	1
Sampdoria	1	2	3

== Final ==
=== First leg ===
30 June 1985
20:30

Milan	0–1	Sampdoria
		Souness 24'

San Siro, Milan
Attendance: 40,000
Referee: Giancarlo Redini

=== Second leg ===
3 July 1985
20:30

Sampdoria	2–1	Milan
Mancini 41' (pen.); Vialli 61'		Virdis 66'

Stadio Luigi Ferraris, Genoa
Attendance: 42,043
Referee: Luigi Agnolin

Sampdoria won 3–1 on aggregate.

== Top goalscorers ==
Rank	Player	Club	Goals
1	(England) Trevor Francis	Sampdoria	9
2	(Italy) Massimo Briaschi	Juventus	7
3	(Italy) Alessandro Altobelli	Internazionale	6
3	(Italy) Paolo Monelli	Fiorentina	6
3	(Italy) Gianluca Vialli	Sampdoria	6
6	(Italy) Antonio Di Gennaro	Hellas Verona	5
6	(Denmark) Preben Elkjær	Hellas Verona	5
6	(Germany) Karl-Heinz Rummenigge	Internazionale	5
