= List of Coppa Italia finals =

List of annual association football matches

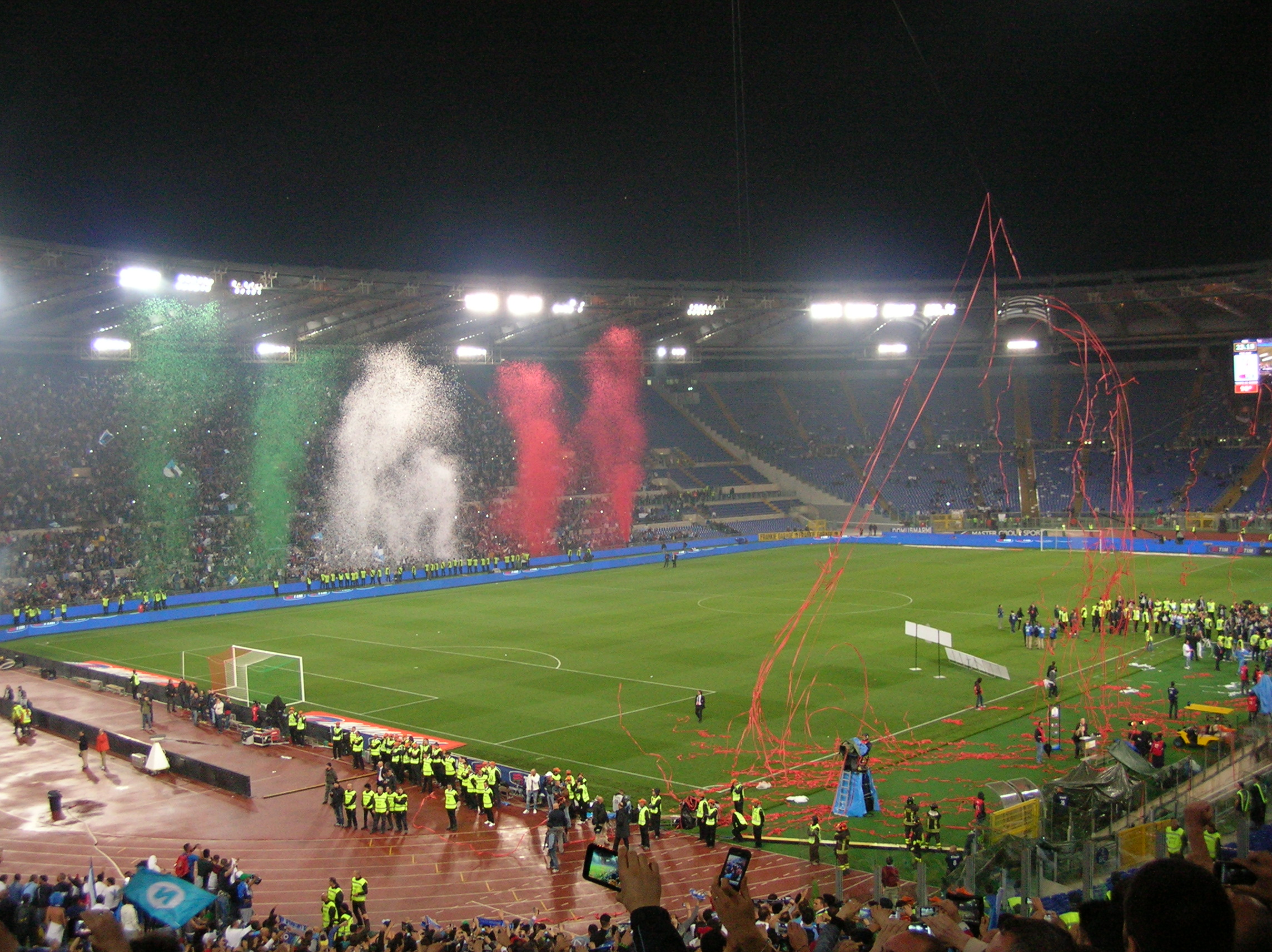
- The Stadio Olimpico in Rome during the 2012 final
- Founded: 1922; 104 years ago
- Region: Italy
- Current champions: Inter Milan (10th title)
- Most championships: Juventus (15 titles)
- 2026 Coppa Italia final

The Coppa Italia is an annual football cup competition established in Italy in 1922. The competition is open to all Serie A and Serie B clubs, as well as four teams from Serie C.

Since the first final between Vado and Udinese in 1922, 78 finals have taken place. There have been 44 single-match finals, one of which was replayed after the initial game ended in a goalless draw. On 30 occasions, the final two teams played against each other over two legs on a home-and-away basis. On four occasions, a final group of four teams played a double round-robin tournament to determine the winners. As of 2026, 26 different teams have competed in the final, with 16 of them winning the competition at least once. On 12 occasions, the winning team also won Serie A in the same season, thus making a domestic double. Inter Milan are the only team to win Serie A, Coppa Italia and UEFA Champions League in the same year, in 2010. The tournament was not held in the years 1923–1925, 1928–1935 and 1944–1957. It was recommenced in 1958, in conjunction with the UEFA project for a new competition, the European Cup Winners' Cup.

The Stadio Olimpico of Rome has hosted the most finals (44); since 2008, all finals have been held there in the form of a single-leg match, with the exception of the 2021 final, which was held at the Mapei Stadium – Città del Tricolore in Reggio Emilia. The cities to host the final the fewest times are Vado Ligure, Venice, Ancona, Vicenza and Reggio Emilia (once each). Juventus hold the record for the most wins with 15, the highest number of consecutive victories in the final (4), and most appearances in the final (22). AC Milan have lost the most finals (10). Of the teams who have participated in more than one final, Palermo and Hellas Verona share the worst win–loss record with three defeats and no victories each. Of the victorious teams, Atalanta have the lowest percentage of success, winning one out of six finals (16.67 per cent). Two teams from outside the top league have won the cup: Vado in 1922 (from Promozione (Note: At that time, this championship was the second tier of the Italian football league system.)) and Napoli in 1962 (from Serie B).

The highest-scoring final was the first leg between Roma and Inter Milan in 2007, with eight goals. On seven occasions, the result was a goalless draw, four of which were a single-leg final. The match with the largest margin of victory was the second leg between Sampdoria and Ancona in 1994, which Sampdoria won 6–1. Seven finals have been decided by a penalty shoot-out, the most recent being between Napoli and Juventus in 2020. The current winners are Inter Milan, who beat Lazio 2–0 in the 2026 final.

== List of finals ==
Key to list of winners
†	Match went to extra time
*	Match decided via penalty shoot-out
&	Match won after a replay
‡	Winning team won the Double (League title and Coppa Italia)
#	Winning team won the Continental Treble (League title, Coppa Italia and European Cup/Champions League)
Italics	Team from outside the top tier of the Italian football league system

- The "Season" column refers to the season the competition was held, and wikilinks to the article about that season.
- The wikilinks in the "Score" column point to the article about that season's final game.

Coppa Italia finals
Season	Winners	Score	Runners-up	Venue	Attendance
1922	Vado	1–0^{†}	Udinese	Campo di Leo, Vado Ligure	—N/a
1923–1925 (Note: The competition was not held due to a lack of interest towards it.)	Not held				
1926–27 (Note: The competition was not concluded due to a lack of available dates.)	Not concluded				
1928–1935	Not held				
1935–36	Torino	5–1	Alessandria	Stadio Luigi Ferraris, Genoa	—N/a
1936–37	Genova	1–0	Roma	Stadio Giovanni Berta, Florence	—N/a
1937–38	Juventus	3–1	Torino	Stadio Filadelfia, Turin	15,000
1937–38	Juventus	2–1	Torino	Stadio Benito Mussolini, Turin	8,000
1937–38	Juventus won 5–2 on aggregate.				
1938–39	Ambrosiana	2–1	Novara	Stadio Nazionale, Rome	—N/a
1939–40	Fiorentina	1–0	Genova	Stadio Giovanni Berta, Florence	9,000
1940–41	Venezia	3–3	Roma	Stadio Nazionale, Rome	12,000
1940–41	Venezia	1–0	Roma	Stadio Pier Luigi Penzo, Venice	—N/a
1940–41	Venezia won 4–3 on aggregate.				
1941–42	Juventus	1–1	AC Milan	San Siro, Milan	—N/a
1941–42	Juventus	4–1	AC Milan	Stadio Benito Mussolini, Turin	—N/a
1941–42	Juventus won 5–2 on aggregate.				
1942–43	Torino ‡	4–0	Venezia	San Siro, Milan	11,000
1944–1957 (Note: The competition was not held due to conflicting schedules following the expansion of Serie A to 20 teams.)	Not held				
1958	Lazio	1–0	Fiorentina	Stadio Olimpico, Rome	60,000
1958–59	Juventus	4–1	Inter Milan	San Siro, Milan	80,000
1959–60	Juventus ‡	3–2^{†}	Fiorentina	San Siro, Milan	75,000
1960–61	Fiorentina	2–0	Lazio	Stadio Comunale, Florence	—N/a
1961–62	Napoli	2–1	SPAL	Stadio Olimpico, Rome	—N/a
1962–63	Atalanta	3–1	Torino	San Siro, Milan	23,000
1963–64	Roma	1–0^{&} (Note: The first final, played at Stadio Olimpico in Rome, ended 0–0 after extra time.)	Torino	Stadio Comunale, Turin	31,145 (Note: Attendance at the replayed match.)
1964–65	Juventus	1–0	Inter Milan	Stadio Olimpico, Rome	70,000
1965–66	Fiorentina	2–1^{†}	Catanzaro	Stadio Olimpico, Rome	20,000
1966–67	AC Milan	1–0	Padova	Stadio Olimpico, Rome	—N/a
1967–68	Torino	(Note: In this edition, the final group was played instead of the final match, and the first-placed team was declared winners.)	AC Milan		—N/a
1968–69	Roma		Cagliari		—N/a
1969–70	Bologna		Torino		—N/a
1970–71	Torino	(Note: In this edition, the final group was played instead of the final match. To break the tie for first place in the group, a play-off game at Stadio Luigi Ferraris in Genoa was played. Torino won 5–3 in a penalty shoot-out, after 90 minutes and extra time.)	AC Milan		31,627 (Note: Attendance at the play-off match only.)
1971–72	AC Milan	2–0	Napoli	Stadio Olimpico, Rome	—N/a
1972–73	AC Milan	1–1* (Note: Score was 1–1 after 90 minutes and extra time. Milan won the penalty shoot-out 5–2.)	Juventus	Stadio Olimpico, Rome	60,000
1973–74	Bologna	1–1* (Note: Score was 1–1 after 90 minutes and extra time. Bologna won the penalty shoot-out 4–3.)	Palermo	Stadio Olimpico, Rome	18,000
1974–75	Fiorentina	3–2	AC Milan	Stadio Olimpico, Rome	40,000
1975–76	Napoli	4–0	Hellas Verona	Stadio Olimpico, Rome	—N/a
1976–77	AC Milan	2–0	Inter Milan	San Siro, Milan	70,000
1977–78	Inter Milan	2–1	Napoli	Stadio Olimpico, Rome	—N/a
1978–79	Juventus	2–1	Palermo	Stadio Olimpico, Rome	40,000
1979–80	Roma	0–0* (Note: Score was 0–0 after 90 minutes and extra time. Roma won the penalty shoot-out 3–2.)	Torino	Stadio Olimpico, Rome	53,279
1980–81	Roma	1–1	Torino	Stadio Olimpico, Rome	50,000
1980–81	Roma	1–1* (Note: Score was 1–1 after 90 minutes and extra time. Roma won the penalty shoot-out 4–2.)	Torino	Stadio Comunale, Turin	40,000
1980–81	2–2 on aggregate; Roma won 4–2 on penalties.				
1981–82	Inter Milan	1–0	Torino	San Siro, Milan	—N/a
1981–82	Inter Milan	1–1	Torino	Stadio Comunale, Turin	50,000
1981–82	Inter Milan won 2–1 on aggregate.				
1982–83	Juventus	0–2	Hellas Verona	Stadio Marcantonio Bentegodi, Verona	—N/a
1982–83	Juventus	3–0^{†}	Hellas Verona	Stadio Comunale, Turin	—N/a
1982–83	Juventus won 3–2 on aggregate.				
1983–84	Roma	1–1	Hellas Verona	Stadio Marcantonio Bentegodi, Verona	30,000
1983–84	Roma	1–0	Hellas Verona	Stadio Olimpico, Rome	45,101
1983–84	Roma won 2–1 on aggregate.				
1984–85	Sampdoria	1–0	AC Milan	San Siro, Milan	40,000
1984–85	Sampdoria	2–1	AC Milan	Stadio Luigi Ferraris, Genoa	42,043
1984–85	Sampdoria won 3–1 on aggregate.				
1985–86	Roma	1–2	Sampdoria	Stadio Luigi Ferraris, Genoa	25,000
1985–86	Roma	2–0	Sampdoria	Stadio Olimpico, Rome	—N/a
1985–86	Roma won 3–2 on aggregate.				
1986–87	Napoli ‡	3–0	Atalanta	Stadio San Paolo, Naples	60,000
1986–87	Napoli ‡	1–0	Atalanta	Stadio Atleti Azzurri d'Italia, Bergamo	11,143
1986–87	Napoli won 4–0 on aggregate.				
1987–88	Sampdoria	2–0	Torino	Stadio Luigi Ferraris, Genoa	17,236
1987–88	Sampdoria	1–2	Torino	Stadio Comunale, Turin	33,000
1987–88	Sampdoria won 3–2 on aggregate.				
1988–89	Sampdoria	0–1	Napoli	Stadio San Paolo, Naples	70,300
1988–89	Sampdoria	4–0	Napoli	Stadio Luigi Ferraris, Genoa	34,400
1988–89	Sampdoria won 4–1 on aggregate.				
1989–90	Juventus	0–0	AC Milan	Stadio Comunale, Turin	—N/a
1989–90	Juventus	1–0	AC Milan	San Siro, Milan	83,928
1989–90	Juventus won 1–0 on aggregate.				
1990–91	Roma	3–1	Sampdoria	Stadio Olimpico, Rome	55,067
1990–91	Roma	1–1	Sampdoria	Stadio Luigi Ferraris, Genoa	36,577
1990–91	Roma won 4–2 on aggregate.				
1991–92	Parma	0–1	Juventus	Stadio delle Alpi, Turin	47,872
1991–92	Parma	2–0	Juventus	Stadio Ennio Tardini, Parma	24,471
1991–92	Parma won 2–1 on aggregate.				
1992–93	Torino	3–0	Roma	Stadio delle Alpi, Turin	43,732
1992–93	Torino	2–5	Roma	Stadio Olimpico, Rome	63,646
1992–93	5–5 on aggregate; Torino won on away goals.				
1993–94	Sampdoria	0–0	Ancona	Stadio del Conero, Ancona	16,871
1993–94	Sampdoria	6–1	Ancona	Stadio Luigi Ferraris, Genoa	39,000
1993–94	Sampdoria won 6–1 on aggregate.				
1994–95	Juventus ‡	1–0	Parma	Stadio delle Alpi, Turin	33,840
1994–95	Juventus ‡	2–0	Parma	Stadio Ennio Tardini, Parma	23,823
1994–95	Juventus won 3–0 on aggregate.				
1995–96	Fiorentina	1–0	Atalanta	Stadio Artemio Franchi, Florence	39,992
1995–96	Fiorentina	2–0	Atalanta	Stadio Atleti Azzurri d'Italia, Bergamo	25,977
1995–96	Fiorentina won 3–0 on aggregate.				
1996–97	Vicenza	0–1	Napoli	Stadio San Paolo, Naples	65,932
1996–97	Vicenza	3–0^{†}	Napoli	Stadio Romeo Menti, Vicenza	19,144
1996–97	Vicenza won 3–1 on aggregate.				
1997–98	Lazio	0–1	AC Milan	San Siro, Milan	63,564
1997–98	Lazio	3–1	AC Milan	Stadio Olimpico, Rome	64,189
1997–98	Lazio won 3–2 on aggregate.				
1998–99	Parma	1–1	Fiorentina	Stadio Ennio Tardini, Parma	21,038
1998–99	Parma	2–2	Fiorentina	Stadio Artemio Franchi, Florence	39,070
1998–99	3–3 on aggregate; Parma won on away goals.				
1999–2000	Lazio ‡	2–1	Inter Milan	Stadio Olimpico, Rome	35,000
1999–2000	Lazio ‡	0–0	Inter Milan	San Siro, Milan	53,406
1999–2000	Lazio won 2–1 on aggregate.				
2000–01	Fiorentina	1–0	Parma	Stadio Ennio Tardini, Parma	17,685
2000–01	Fiorentina	1–1	Parma	Stadio Artemio Franchi, Florence	37,664
2000–01	Fiorentina won 2–1 on aggregate.				
2001–02	Parma	1–2	Juventus	Stadio delle Alpi, Turin	35,874
2001–02	Parma	1–0	Juventus	Stadio Ennio Tardini, Parma	26,864
2001–02	2–2 on aggregate; Parma won on away goals.				
2002–03	AC Milan	4–1	Roma	Stadio Olimpico, Rome	60,647
2002–03	AC Milan	2–2	Roma	San Siro, Milan	70,061
2002–03	Milan won 6–3 on aggregate.				
2003–04	Lazio	2–0	Juventus	Stadio Olimpico, Rome	62,204
2003–04	Lazio	2–2	Juventus	Stadio delle Alpi, Turin	38,849
2003–04	Lazio won 4–2 on aggregate.				
2004–05	Inter Milan	2–0	Roma	Stadio Olimpico, Rome	73,437
2004–05	Inter Milan	1–0	Roma	San Siro, Milan	72,034
2004–05	Inter Milan won 3–0 on aggregate.				
2005–06	Inter Milan ‡	1–1	Roma	Stadio Olimpico, Rome	64,000
2005–06	Inter Milan ‡	3–1	Roma	San Siro, Milan	59,000
2005–06	Inter Milan won 4–2 on aggregate.				
2006–07	Roma	6–2	Inter Milan	Stadio Olimpico, Rome	39,065
2006–07	Roma	1–2	Inter Milan	San Siro, Milan	26,606
2006–07	Roma won 7–4 on aggregate.				
2007–08	Roma	2–1	Inter Milan	Stadio Olimpico, Rome	60,000
2008–09	Lazio	1–1* (Note: Score was 1–1 after 90 minutes and extra time. Lazio won the penalty shoot-out 6–5.)	Sampdoria	Stadio Olimpico, Rome	68,000
2009–10	Inter Milan #	1–0	Roma	Stadio Olimpico, Rome	50,000
2010–11	Inter Milan	3–1	Palermo	Stadio Olimpico, Rome	70,000
2011–12	Napoli	2–0	Juventus	Stadio Olimpico, Rome	70,000
2012–13	Lazio	1–0	Roma	Stadio Olimpico, Rome	70,000
2013–14	Napoli	3–1	Fiorentina	Stadio Olimpico, Rome	65,000
2014–15	Juventus ‡	2–1^{†}	Lazio	Stadio Olimpico, Rome	60,000
2015–16	Juventus ‡	1–0^{†}	AC Milan	Stadio Olimpico, Rome	72,698
2016–17	Juventus ‡	2–0	Lazio	Stadio Olimpico, Rome	66,341
2017–18	Juventus ‡	4–0	AC Milan	Stadio Olimpico, Rome	66,400
2018–19	Lazio	2–0	Atalanta	Stadio Olimpico, Rome	57,059
2019–20	Napoli	0–0* (Note: Score was 0–0 after 90 minutes. Napoli won the penalty shoot-out 4–2.)	Juventus	Stadio Olimpico, Rome	0 (Note: The 2020 final was played behind closed doors due to the COVID-19 pandemic in Italy.)
2020–21	Juventus	2–1	Atalanta	Mapei Stadium – Città del Tricolore, Reggio Emilia	4,300 (Note: Stadium capacity was limited to 20% due to the COVID-19 pandemic in Italy.)
2021–22	Inter Milan	4–2^{†}	Juventus	Stadio Olimpico, Rome	67,944
2022–23	Inter Milan	2–1	Fiorentina	Stadio Olimpico, Rome	68,500
2023–24	Juventus	1–0	Atalanta	Stadio Olimpico, Rome	66,854
2024–25	Bologna	1–0	AC Milan	Stadio Olimpico, Rome	68,500
2025–26	Inter Milan ‡	2–0	Lazio	Stadio Olimpico, Rome	68,729

== Results by club ==
Performance in the Coppa Italia by club
Club	Winners	Runners-up	Years won	Years runners-up
Juventus	15	7	1938, 1942, 1959, 1960, 1965, 1979, 1983, 1990, 1995, 2015, 2016, 2017, 2018, 2021, 2024	1973, 1992, 2002, 2004, 2012, 2020, 2022
Internazionale	10	6	1939, 1978, 1982, 2005, 2006, 2010, 2011, 2022, 2023, 2026	1959, 1965, 1977, 2000, 2007, 2008
Roma	9	8	1964, 1969, 1980, 1981, 1984, 1986, 1991, 2007, 2008	1937, 1941, 1993, 2003, 2005, 2006, 2010, 2013
Lazio	7	4	1958, 1998, 2000, 2004, 2009, 2013, 2019	1961, 2015, 2017, 2026
Fiorentina	6	5	1940, 1961, 1966, 1975, 1996, 2001	1958, 1960, 1999, 2014, 2023
Napoli	6	4	1962, 1976, 1987, 2012, 2014, 2020	1972, 1978, 1989, 1997
AC Milan	5	10	1967, 1972, 1973, 1977, 2003	1942, 1968, 1971, 1975, 1985, 1990, 1998, 2016, 2018, 2025
Torino	5	8	1936, 1943, 1968, 1971, 1993	1938, 1963, 1964, 1970, 1980, 1981, 1982, 1988
Sampdoria	4	3	1985, 1988, 1989, 1994	1986, 1991, 2009
Parma	3	2	1992, 1999, 2002	1995, 2001
Bologna	3	—	1970, 1974, 2025	—
Atalanta	1	5	1963	1987, 1996, 2019, 2021, 2024
Genoa	1	1	1937	1940
Venezia	1	1	1941	1943
Vado	1	—	1922	—
Vicenza	1	—	1997	—
Palermo	—	3	—	1974, 1979, 2011
Hellas Verona	—	3	—	1976, 1983, 1984
Udinese	—	1	—	1922
Alessandria	—	1	—	1936
Novara	—	1	—	1939
SPAL	—	1	—	1962
Catanzaro	—	1	—	1966
Padova	—	1	—	1967
Cagliari	—	1	—	1969
Ancona	—	1	—	1994
