= 1985–86 UC Sampdoria season =

Sampdoria
1985–86 season
- Owner: Paolo Mantovani
- Chairman: Paolo Mantovani
- Manager: Eugenio Bersellini
- Stadium: Stadio Luigi Ferraris
- Serie A: 12th
- Cup Winners' Cup: Last 16
- Coppa Italia: Runners-up
- Top goalscorer: Roberto Mancini (6)
Home colours	Away colours

UC Sampdoria fell short of repeating its successful 1984–85 season, ending up in 12th position in the league. It did almost defend its cup title successfully, but despite a 2–1 victory in the first leg, it lost to Roma in the return leg. Sampdoria's European adventure did not live up to expectations, it not even reaching the quarter-finals of the Cup Winners' Cup.

== Squad ==
Note: Flags indicate national team as defined under FIFA eligibility rules; some limited exceptions apply. Players may hold more than one non-FIFA nationality.

Pos.	Nation	Player
GK	ITA	Ivano Bordon
GK	ITA	Roberto Bocchino
DF	ITA	Moreno Mannini
DF	ITA	Antonio Paganin
DF	ITA	Roberto Galia
DF	ITA	Luca Pellegrini
DF	ITA	Pietro Vierchowod
DF	ITA	Andrea Veronici
MF	ITA	Fausto Pari
MF	ITA	Fausto Salsano

Pos.	Nation	Player
MF	ITA	Alessandro Scanziani
MF	SCO	Graeme Souness
MF	ITA	Fiondella
MF	ITA	Gianfranco Matteoli
FW	ENG	Trevor Francis
FW	ITA	Roberto Mancini
FW	ITA	Gianluca Vialli
FW	ITA	Giuseppe Lorenzo
FW	ITA	Fabio Aselli
FW	ITA	Maurizio Ganz

=== Transfers ===
In
Pos.	Name	from	Type
FW	Giuseppe Lorenzo	Catanzaro	
MF	Gianfranco Matteoli	Como	
FW	Maurizio Ganz		
FW	Fabio Aselli		
MF	Fiondella		
DF	Andrea Veronici		

Out
Pos.	Name	to	Type
DF	Alessandro Renica	Napoli	
MF	Evaristo Beccalossi	Monza	
DF	Enzo Gambaro	Parma	
MF	Francesco Casagrande	Como	
MF	Giovanni Picasso		

== Competitions ==
=== Serie A ===
==== League table ====
Pos	Team	Pld	W	D	L	GF	GA	GD	Pts	Qualification or relegation
10	Hellas Verona	30	9	10	11	31	40	−9	28	
11	Avellino	30	9	9	12	28	38	−10	27	
12	Sampdoria	30	8	11	11	27	25	+2	27	
13	Udinese	30	6	13	11	31	37	−6	25	
14	Pisa (R)	30	5	13	12	27	40	−13	23	Relegation to Serie B

Source: RSSSF.com
Rules for classification: 1) Points; 2) Head-to-head points; 3) Head-to-head goal difference; 4) Goal difference; 5) Goals scored; 6) Draw. (Note: Head-to-head record is used only after all the matches between the teams in question have been played).
(R) Relegated

==== Results summary ====
Overall								Home						Away					
Pld	W	D	L	GF	GA	GD	Pts	W	D	L	GF	GA	GD	W	D	L	GF	GA	GD
30	8	11	11	27	25	+2	35	6	8	1	16	5	+11	2	3	10	11	20	−9

Source: Worldfootball

==== Results by round ====
Round	1	2	3	4	5	6	7	8	9	10	11	12	13	14	15	16	17	18	19	20	21	22	23	24	25	26	27	28	29	30	31
Ground	A	H	A	A	H	A	H	A	H	H	A	H	A	H	A	A	H	A	H	H	A	H	A	H	A	A	H	A	H	A	H
Result	L	W	L	L	D	L	D	W	L	W	D	W	-	W	L	L	D	D	W	D	D	D	L	W	L	W	D	L	D	L	D
Position	11	6	10	12	12	14	13	10	12	11	11	9	11	9	9	9	9	9	9	8	8	8	9	8	9	9	8	10	10	12	11

Source: http://calcio-seriea.net/allenatori_squadra/1985/919/
A = Away; H = Home; W = Win; D = Draw; L = Loss; = 1986–87 European Cup; = 1986–87 UEFA Cup; = Relegation to 1986–87 Serie B

==== Matches ====
8 September 1985 1	Fiorentina	1–0	Sampdoria	Florence
	Massaro 75'	Report		Stadium: Stadio Artemio Franchi; Referee: Paolo Casarin

15 September 1985 2	Sampdoria	2–0	Bari	Genoa
	Matteoli 18'; Vialli 47'	Report		Stadium: Stadio Luigi Ferraris; Attendance: 26,210; Referee: Pierluigi Magni

22 September 1985 3	Udinese	2–1	Sampdoria	Udine
	Carnevale 40'; Galparoli 51'	Report	Pari 74'	Stadium: Stadio Friuli; Referee: Salvatore Lombardo

29 September 1985 4	Torino	1–0	Sampdoria	Turin
	Júnior 64'	Report		Stadium: Stadio Comunale; Referee: Paolo Bergamo

6 October 1985 5	Sampdoria	1–1	Milan	Genoa
	Vialli 58'	Report	Hateley 14'	Stadium: Stadio Luigi Ferraris; Attendance: 32,867; Referee: Pietro D'Elia

13 October 1985 6	Hellas Verona	2–1	Sampdoria	Verona
	Bruni 14'; Turchetta 36' (pen.)	Report	Salsano 54'	Stadium: Stadio Marcantonio Bentegodi; Referee: Romeo Paparesta

20 October 1985 7	Sampdoria	0–0	Atalanta	Genoa
		Report		Stadium: Stadio Luigi Ferraris; Attendance: 23,491; Referee: Sergio Coppetelli

27 October 1985 8	Pisa	0–2	Sampdoria	Pisa
		Report	Souness 60'; Scanziani 77'	Stadium: Arena Garibaldi; Referee: Rosario Lo Bello

3 November 1985 9	Sampdoria	0–2	Avellino	Genoa
		Report	Diaz 60', 79'	Stadium: Stadio Luigi Ferraris; Attendance: 22,199; Referee: Luciano Luci

10 November 1985 10	Sampdoria	2–0	Lecce	Genoa
	Souness 54'; Mancini 69' (pen.)	Report		Stadium: Stadio Luigi Ferraris; Attendance: 16,672; Referee: Pierluigi Magni

24 November 1985 11	Como	2–2	Sampdoria	Como
	Corneliusson 8'; Borgonovo 84'	Report	Lorenzo 15'; Vialli 44'	Stadium: Stadio Giuseppe Sinigaglia; Referee: Luigi Agnolin

1 December 1985 12	Sampdoria	1–0	Roma	Genoa
	Mannini 32'	Report		Stadium: Stadio Luigi Ferraris; Attendance: 25,417; Referee: Romeo Paparesta

15 December 1985 14	Sampdoria	2–0	Napoli	Genoa
	Lorenzo 14'; Mancini 41'	Report		Stadium: Stadio Luigi Ferraris; Attendance: 41,661; Referee: Rosario Lo Bello

22 December 1985 15	Internazionale	1–0	Sampdoria	Milan
	Bergomi 9'	Report		Stadium: San Siro; Referee: Tullio Lanese

31 December 1985 13	Juventus	1–0	Sampdoria	Turin
	Platini 39'	Report		Stadium: Stadio Comunale; Referee: Paolo Casarin

5 January 1986 16	Sampdoria	2–2	Fiorentina	Genoa
	Lorenzo 9'; Francis 85'	Report	Bordon 8' (o.g.); Iorio 49'	Stadium: Stadio Luigi Ferraris; Attendance: 25,844; Referee: Carlo Longhi

12 January 1986 17	Bari	0–0	Sampdoria	Bari
		Report		Stadium: Stadio della Vittoria; Referee: Pietro D'Elia

19 January 1986 18	Sampdoria	3–0	Udinese	Genoa
	Souness 13'; Mancini 41', 79'	Report		Stadium: Stadio Luigi Ferraris; Attendance: 21,264; Referee: Rosario Lo Bello

26 January 1986 19	Sampdoria	0–0	Torino	Genoa
		Report		Stadium: Stadio Luigi Ferraris; Attendance: 31,271; Referee: Romeo Paparesta

9 February 1986 20	Milan	2–2	Sampdoria	Milan
	Salsano 7' (o.g.); Wilkins 27'	Report	Vierchowod 13'; Mancini 39'	Stadium: San Siro; Referee: Pierluigi Pairetto

16 February 1986 21	Sampdoria	0–0	Hellas Verona	Genoa
		Report		Stadium: Stadio Luigi Ferraris; Attendance: 22,323; Referee: Alberto Boschi

23 February 1986 22	Atalanta	2–1	Sampdoria	Bergamo
	Magrin 79' (pen.); Magrin 90'	Report	Mancini 40' (pen.)	Stadium: Stadio Comunale; Referee: Massimo Leni

2 March 1986 23	Sampdoria	3–0	Pisa	Genoa
	Vialli 5', 19'; Chiti 15' (o.g.)	Report		Stadium: Stadio Luigi Ferraris; Attendance: 16,569; Referee: Paolo Casarin

9 March 1986 24	Avellino	2–1	Sampdoria	Avellino
	Colombo 21'; De Napoli 73'	Report	Garuti 61' (o.g.)	Stadium: Stadio Partenio; Referee: Roberto Bianciardi

16 March 1986 25	Lecce	0–1	Sampdoria	Lecce
		Report	Vialli 45' (pen.)	Stadium: Stadio Via del Mare; Referee: Gennaro Testa

23 March 1986 26	Sampdoria	0–0	Como	Genoa
		Report		Stadium: Stadio Luigi Ferraris; Attendance: 20,323; Referee: Rosario Lo Bello

6 April 1986 27	Roma	1–0	Sampdoria	Rome
	Graziani 74'	Report		Stadium: Stadio Olimpico; Referee: Pierluigi Magni

13 April 1986 28	Sampdoria	0–0	Juventus	Genoa
		Report		Stadium: Stadio Luigi Ferraris; Attendance: 47,303; Referee: Tullio Lanese

20 April 1986 29	Napoli	3–0	Sampdoria	Naples
	Giordano 28'; Bagni 40'; Celestini 85'	Report		Stadium: Stadio San Paolo; Referee: Pierluigi Pairetto

27 April 1986 30	Sampdoria	0–0	Internazionale	Genoa
		Report		Stadium: Stadio Luigi Ferraris; Attendance: 21,118; Referee: Giorgio Baldi

=== Topscorers ===
- (Italy) Roberto Mancini 6
- (Italy) Gianluca Vialli 6
- (Italy) Giuseppe Lorenzo 3
- (Scotland) Graeme Souness 3

=== Coppa Italia ===
==== Group stage (Group 3) ====
Pos	Team	Pld	W	D	L	GF	GA	GD	Pts
1	Atalanta(1)	5	2	3	0	9	5	+4	7
2	Sampdoria(1)	5	2	3	0	7	3	+4	7
3	Lazio(2)	5	2	3	0	5	2	+3	7
4	Monopoli(3)	5	2	0	3	3	6	−3	4
5	Taranto(3)	5	1	1	3	3	8	−5	3
6	Catania(2)	5	0	2	3	3	6	−3	2

21 August 1985 1	Taranto	1–4	Sampdoria	Taranto
17:30 CEST	Caputi 85'		Souness 28', 40'; Vialli 44'; Francis 83'	Stadium: Stadio Erasmo Iacovone; Referee: Salvatore Lombardo

25 August 1985 2	Catania	0–0	Sampdoria	Catania
17:00 CEST				Stadium: Stadio Cibali; Referee: Paolo Casarin

28 August 1985 3	Sampdoria	1–0	Monopoli	Genoa
20:30 CEST	Pellegrini I 36'			Stadium: Stadio Luigi Ferraris; Referee: Angelo Pellicanò

1 September 1985 4	Lazio	0–0	Sampdoria	Rome
20:45 CEST				Stadium: Stadio Olimpico; Referee: Giancarlo Redini

4 September 1985 5	Sampdoria	2–2	Atalanta	Genoa
20:30 CEST	Lorenzo 49'; Osti 63' (o.g.)		Cantarutti 25'; Peters 54'	Stadium: Stadio Luigi Ferraris; Referee: Pierluigi Pairetto

==== Round of 16 ====
26 February 1986 First leg	Sampdoria	3–0	Vicenza	Genoa
20:30 CET	Lorenzo 41' (pen.), 62'; Matteoli 76'			Stadium: Stadio Luigi Ferraris; Referee: Giancarlo Pirandola

12 February 1986 Second leg	Vicenza	2–2 (2–5 agg.)	Sampdoria	Vicenza
15:00 CET	Schincaglia 6'; Pellegrini 41' (o.g.)		Vialli 17'; Salsano 51'	Stadium: Stadio Romeo Menti; Attendance: 8,000; Referee: Carlo Longhi

==== Quarter-finals ====
7 May 1986 First leg	Sampdoria	2–0	Torino	Genoa
20:30 CEST	Rossi 55' (o.g.); Mancini 90'			Stadium: Stadio Luigi Ferraris; Attendance: 30,000; Referee: Tullio Lanese

24 May 1986 Second leg	Torino	3–4 (3–6 agg.)	Sampdoria	Turin
20:30 CEST	Francini 33'; Mariani 47'; Schachner 67'		Matteoli 39'; Mancini 43', 90' (pen.); Lorenzo 64'	Stadium: Stadio Comunale; Attendance: 30,000; Referee: Pietro D'Elia

==== Semi-finals ====
28 May 1986 First leg	Sampdoria	1–1	Como	Genoa
20:30 CEST	Salsano 61'		Maccoppi 72'	Stadium: Stadio Luigi Ferraris; Attendance: 24,000; Referee: Carlo Longhi

4 June 1986 Second leg	Como	0–2; Awarded (1–3 agg.)	Sampdoria	Como
20:30 CEST	Albiero 85'; Borgonovo 96'		Francis 87'	Stadium: Stadio Giuseppe Sinigaglia; Attendance: 10,000; Referee: Giancarlo Redini
Note: The match was awarded by the sports judge 0–2 in favor of Sampdoria, due to an object thrown from the stands, after having whistled a penalty in favor of Sampdoria, which hit the referee Redini, who was forced to suspend the match in the 7th minute of the first half of extra time with the score at 2–1 for Como.

==== Final ====
7 June 1986 First leg	Sampdoria	2–1	Roma	Genoa
21:00 CEST	Mancini 19'; Galia 67'		Tovalieri 45'	Stadium: Stadio Luigi Ferraris; Attendance: 25,000; Referee: Paolo Casarin

14 June 1986 Second leg	Roma	2–0 (3–2 agg.)	Sampdoria	Rome
21:00 CEST	Desideri 43' (pen.); Cerezo 89'			Stadium: Stadio Olimpico; Attendance: 38,000; Referee: Tullio Lanese

=== European Cup Winners' Cup ===
==== First round ====
18 September 1985 First leg	AEL (Greece)	1–1	(Italy) Sampdoria	Larissa, Greece
	Mitsibonas 39'	Report	Mancini 81'	Stadium: Alcazar Stadium; Attendance: 17,000; Referee: Jan Keizer (Netherlands)

2 October 1985 Second leg	Sampdoria (Italy)	1–0 (2–1 agg.)	(Greece) AEL	Genoa, Italy
	Mancini 41'	Report		Stadium: Stadio Luigi Ferraris; Attendance: 33,840; Referee: Siegfried Kirschen (East Germany)

==== Second round ====
23 October 1985 First leg	Benfica (Portugal)	2–0	(Italy) Sampdoria	Lisbon, Portugal
	Diamantino 47'; Rui Águas 89'	Report		Stadium: Estádio da Luz; Attendance: 75,000; Referee: Vojtech Christov (Czechoslovakia)

6 November 1985 Second leg	Sampdoria (Italy)	1–0 (1–2 agg.)	(Portugal) Benfica	Genoa, Italy
	Lorenzo 62'	Report		Stadium: Stadio Luigi Ferraris; Attendance: 28,881; Referee: Volker Roth (West Germany)

== Statistics ==
=== Players statistics ===
No.	Pos	Nat	Player	Total		Serie A		Coppa		ECWC	
No.	Pos	Nat	Player	Apps	Goals	Apps	Goals	Apps	Goals	Apps	Goals
	GK	(Italy) ITA	Ivano Bordon	46	-39	30	-25	12	-11	4	-3
	DF	(Italy) ITA	Moreno Mannini	39	1	26	1	9	0	4	0
	DF	(Italy) ITA	Pietro Vierchowod	39	1	28	1	7	0	4	0
	DF	(Italy) ITA	Luca Pellegrini	45	1	29	0	12	1	4	0
	DF	(Italy) ITA	Roberto Galia	38	1	17+6	0	11	1	4	0
	MF	(Italy) ITA	Fausto Pari	45	1	29	1	12	0	4	0
	MF	(Scotland) SCO	Graeme Souness	38	5	28	3	6	2	4	0
	MF	(Italy) ITA	Fausto Salsano	40	3	18+8	1	12	2	2	0
	MF	(Italy) ITA	Alessandro Scanziani	39	1	24+2	1	9	0	4	0
	FW	(Italy) ITA	Gianluca Vialli	39	8	28	6	7	2	4	0
	FW	(Italy) ITA	Roberto Mancini	37	12	17+6	6	10	4	4	2
	GK	(Italy) ITA	Roberto Bocchino	1	-1	0	0	1	-1		
	MF	(Italy) ITA	Gianfranco Matteoli	37	3	20+2	1	12	2	3	0
	FW	(Italy) ITA	Giuseppe Lorenzo	35	8	17+6	3	11	4	1	1
	FW	(England) ENG	Trevor Francis	27	2	9+5	1	10	1	3	0
	DF	(Italy) ITA	Antonio Paganin	22	0	9+5	0	8	0		
	FW	(Italy) ITA	Fabio Aselli	9	0	4	0	5	0		
	DF	(Italy) ITA	Andrea Veronici	4	0	0+2	0	2	0		
	MF	(Italy) ITA	Fiondella	4	0	0	0	4	0		
	FW	(Italy) ITA	Maurizio Ganz	0	0	0	0				

- Source: http://calcio-seriea.net/presenze/1985/919/
