= 1986 Coppa Italia final =

38th Coppa Italia final
- Event: 1985–86 Coppa Italia
Sampdoria	Roma
2	3

First leg
Sampdoria	Roma
2	1
- Date: 7 June 1986
- Venue: Stadio Luigi Ferraris, Genoa
- Referee: Paolo Casarin
- Attendance: 25,000

Second leg
Roma	Sampdoria
2	0
- Date: 14 June 1986
- Venue: Stadio Olimpico, Rome
- Referee: Tullio Lanese
- Attendance: 38,000

The 1986 Coppa Italia final was the final of the 1985–86 Coppa Italia. The match was played over two legs on 7 and 14 June 1986 between Roma and Sampdoria. Roma won 3–2 on aggregate.

== First leg ==
7 June 1986
21:00

Sampdoria	2–1	Roma
Mancini 19'; Galia 67'		Tovalieri 45'

Stadio Luigi Ferraris, Genoa
Attendance: 25,000
Referee: Paolo Casarin

Sampdoria	Roma

GK	1	(Italy) Ivano Bordon
RB	2	(Italy) Moreno Mannini
CB	5	(Italy) Antonio Paganin
CB	6	(Italy) Luca Pellegrini (c)
LB	3	(Italy) Roberto Galia
DM	4	(Italy) Fausto Pari
CM	8	(Italy) Fausto Salsano
CM	10	(Italy) Gianfranco Matteoli
RW	9	(England) Trevor Francis
CF	7	(Italy) Giuseppe Lorenzo	(substituted off) 74'
LW	11	(Italy) Roberto Mancini
Substitutes:
DF		(Italy) Massimiliano Fiondella	(substituted in) 74'
Manager:
(Italy) Eugenio Bersellini

GK	1	(Italy) Attilio Gregori
RB	2	(Italy) Emidio Oddi
CB	5	(Italy) Settimio Lucci
CB	6	(Italy) Ubaldo Righetti
LB	3	(Italy) Manuel Gerolin
DM	4	(Italy) Stefano Desideri
CM	8	(Italy) Giuseppe Giannini
CM	10	(Italy) Antonio Di Carlo
RW	7	(Italy) Francesco Graziani (c)
CF	9	(Italy) Sandro Tovalieri
LW	11	(Italy) Stefano Impallomeni
Manager:
(Sweden) Sven-Göran Eriksson

== Second leg ==
14 June 1986
21:00

Roma	2–0	Sampdoria
Desideri 43' (pen.); Cerezo 89'

Stadio Olimpico, Rome
Attendance: 38,000
Referee: Tullio Lanese

Roma	Sampdoria

GK	1	(Italy) Attilio Gregori
RB	2	(Italy) Emidio Oddi
CB	5	(Italy) Settimio Lucci
CB	6	(Italy) Ubaldo Righetti
LB	3	(Italy) Manuel Gerolin
DM	4	(Italy) Stefano Desideri
CM	8	(Italy) Giuseppe Giannini
CM	10	(Italy) Antonio Di Carlo
RW	7	(Italy) Francesco Graziani	Sent off (straight red)
CF	9	(Italy) Roberto Pruzzo (c)		(substituted off) 83'
LW	11	(Italy) Sandro Tovalieri		(substituted off) 85'
Substitutes:
MF	14	(Brazil) Toninho Cerezo		(substituted in) 85'
FW	16	(Italy) Stefano Impallomeni		(substituted in) 83'
Manager:
(Sweden) Sven-Göran Eriksson

GK	1	(Italy) Ivano Bordon
RB	2	(Italy) Moreno Mannini
CB	5	(Italy) Antonio Paganin
CB	6	(Italy) Luca Pellegrini (c)
LB	3	(Italy) Roberto Galia
DM	4	(Italy) Fausto Pari
RM	7	(Italy) Massimiliano Fiondella	(substituted off) 56'
CM	8	(Italy) Fausto Salsano
LM	10	(Italy) Gianfranco Matteoli
CF	9	(England) Trevor Francis
CF	11	(Italy) Roberto Mancini
Substitutes:
DF	16	(Italy) Giuseppe Lorenzo	(substituted in) 56'
Manager:
(Italy) Eugenio Bersellini

== See also ==
- 1985–86 AS Roma season
- 1985–86 UC Sampdoria season
