= 1985 Coppa Italia final =

37th Coppa Italia final
- Event: 1984–85 Coppa Italia
Milan	Sampdoria
1	3

First leg
Milan	Sampdoria
0	1
- Date: 30 June 1985
- Venue: San Siro, Milan
- Referee: Giancarlo Redini
- Attendance: 40,000

Second leg
Sampdoria	Milan
2	1
- Date: 3 July 1985
- Venue: Stadio Luigi Ferraris, Genoa
- Referee: Luigi Agnolin
- Attendance: 42,043

The 1985 Coppa Italia final was the final of the 1984–85 Coppa Italia. The match was played over two legs on 30 June and 3 July 1985 between Sampdoria and Milan. Sampdoria won 3–1 on aggregate.

== First leg ==
30 June 1985
20:30

Milan	0–1	Sampdoria
		Souness 24'

San Siro, Milan
Attendance: 40,000
Referee: Giancarlo Redini

Milan	Sampdoria

GK	1	(Italy) Giuliano Terraneo
RB	3	(Italy) Mauro Tassotti
CB	5	(Italy) Sergio Battistini
CB	2	(Italy) Franco Baresi (c)
LB	4	(Italy) Andrea Icardi
RM	7	(Italy) Vinicio Verza
CM	10	(Italy) Roberto Scarnecchia	(substituted off) 46'
CM	8	(England) Ray Wilkins
LM	6	(Italy) Alberigo Evani
CF	9	(England) Mark Hateley
CF	11	(Italy) Pietro Paolo Virdis
Substitutes:
DF		(Italy) Luigi Russo	(substituted in) 46'
Manager:
(Sweden) Nils Liedholm

GK	1	(Italy) Ivano Bordon
RB	2	(Italy) Antonio Paganin
CB	5	(Italy) Pietro Vierchowod
CB	6	(Italy) Luca Pellegrini (c)
LB	3	(Italy) Roberto Galia
DM	4	(Italy) Fausto Pari
RM	7	(Italy) Alessandro Scanziani
CM	8	(Scotland) Graeme Souness
LM	10	(Italy) Fausto Salsano	(substituted off) 87'
CF	9	(England) Trevor Francis	(substituted off) 63'
CF	11	(Italy) Gianluca Vialli
Substitutes:
FW		(Italy) Roberto Mancini	(substituted in) 63'
DF		(Italy) Alessandro Renica	(substituted in) 87'
Manager:
(Italy) Eugenio Bersellini

== Second leg ==
3 July 1985
20:30

Sampdoria	2–1	Milan
Mancini 41' (pen.); Vialli 61'		Virdis 66'

Stadio Luigi Ferraris, Genoa
Attendance: 42,043
Referee: Luigi Agnolin

Sampdoria	Milan

GK	1	(Italy) Ivano Bordon
RB	2	(Italy) Antonio Paganin
CB	5	(Italy) Pietro Vierchowod
CB	6	(Italy) Luca Pellegrini (c)
LB	3	(Italy) Alessandro Renica
DM	4	(Italy) Fausto Pari
RM	7	(Italy) Alessandro Scanziani
CM	8	(Scotland) Graeme Souness
LM	10	(Italy) Fausto Salsano	(substituted off) 88'
CF	9	(Italy) Roberto Mancini
CF	11	(Italy) Gianluca Vialli
Substitutes:
MF		(Italy) Francesco Casagrande	(substituted in) 88'
Manager:
(Italy) Eugenio Bersellini

GK	1	(Italy) Giuliano Terraneo
RB	3	(Italy) Luigi Russo	(substituted off) 46'
CB	5	(Italy) Agostino Di Bartolomei
CB	2	(Italy) Franco Baresi (c)	(substituted off) 77'
LB	4	(Italy) Andrea Icardi
RM	7	(Italy) Giuseppe Incocciati
CM	10	(Italy) Sergio Battistini
CM	8	(England) Ray Wilkins
LM	6	(Italy) Mauro Tassotti
CF	9	(England) Mark Hateley
CF	11	(Italy) Pietro Paolo Virdis
Substitutes:
MF		(Italy) Roberto Scarnecchia	(substituted in) 46'
MF		(Italy) Alberigo Evani	(substituted in) 77'
Manager:
(Sweden) Nils Liedholm

== See also ==
- 1984–85 AC Milan season
- 1984–85 UC Sampdoria season
