= 1988 Coppa Italia final =

40th Coppa Italia final
- Event: 1987–88 Coppa Italia
Sampdoria	Torino
3	2

First leg
Sampdoria	Torino
2	0
- Date: 5 May 1988
- Venue: Stadio Luigi Ferraris, Genoa
- Referee: Paolo Casarin
- Attendance: 18,000

Second leg
Torino	Sampdoria
2	1
- After extra time
- Date: 19 May 1988
- Venue: Stadio Comunale, Turin
- Referee: Luigi Agnolin
- Attendance: 33,000

The 1988 Coppa Italia final was the final of the 1987–88 Coppa Italia. The match was played over two legs on 5 and 19 May 1988 between Sampdoria and Torino. Sampdoria won 3–2 on aggregate. It was Sampdoria's second victory.

== First leg ==
5 May 1988
21:00

Sampdoria	2–0	Torino
Briegel 10'; Vialli 33'

Stadio Luigi Ferraris, Genoa
Attendance: 18,000
Referee: Paolo Casarin

Sampdoria	Torino

GK	1	(Italy) Gianluca Pagliuca
RB	2	(Germany) Hans-Peter Briegel
CB	5	(Italy) Pietro Vierchowod
CB	6	(Italy) Luca Pellegrini (c)
LB	3	(Italy) Moreno Mannini
RM	7	(Italy) Fausto Pari
CM	4	(Italy) Luca Fusi	(substituted off) 81'
CM	8	(Brazil) Toninho Cerezo
LM	9	(Italy) Fulvio Bonomi
CF	10	(Italy) Roberto Mancini	(substituted off) 82'
CF	11	(Italy) Gianluca Vialli	(substituted off) 78'
Substitutes:
FW		(Italy) Marco Branca	(substituted in) 78'
MF		(Italy) Fausto Salsano	(substituted in) 81'
FW		(Italy) Maurizio Ganz	(substituted in) 82'
Manager:
(Socialist Federal Republic of Yugoslavia) Vujadin Boškov

GK	1	(Italy) Fabrizio Lorieri
RB	2	(Italy) Giancarlo Corradini	(substituted off) 46'
CB	5	(Italy) Ezio Rossi
CB	6	(Italy) Roberto Cravero (c)
LB	3	(Italy) Giacomo Ferri
RM	7	(Denmark) Klaus Berggreen	(substituted off) 68'
CM	4	(Italy) Massimo Crippa
CM	8	(Italy) Antonio Sabato
LM	10	(Italy) Antonio Comi
CF	9	(Austria) Toni Polster
CF	11	(Italy) Tullio Gritti	(substituted off) 46'
Substitutes:
DF		(Italy) Silvano Benedetti	(substituted in) 46'
FW		(Italy) Giorgio Bresciani	(substituted in) 46'
FW		(Italy) Gianluigi Lentini	(substituted in) 68'
Manager:
(Italy) Luigi Radice

== Second leg ==
19 May 1988
21:00

Torino	2–1 (a.e.t.)	Sampdoria
Vierchowod 5' (o.g.); A. Paganin 35' (o.g.)		Salsano 112'

Stadio Comunale, Turin
Attendance: 33,000
Referee: Luigi Agnolin

Torino	Sampdoria

GK	1	(Italy) Fabrizio Lorieri
RB	2	(Italy) Giancarlo Corradini
CB	5	(Italy) Silvano Benedetti
CB	6	(Italy) Roberto Cravero (c)
LB	3	(Italy) Giacomo Ferri
RM	7	(Italy) Ezio Rossi
CM	4	(Italy) Massimo Crippa
CM	8	(Italy) Antonio Sabato	(substituted off) 89'
LM	10	(Italy) Antonio Comi	(substituted off) 105'
CF	9	(Austria) Toni Polster
CF	11	(Italy) Tullio Gritti	(substituted off) 108'
Substitutes:
MF		(Italy) Diego Fuser	(substituted in) 89'
DF		(Italy) Riki Di Bin	(substituted in) 105'
FW		(Italy) Giorgio Bresciani	(substituted in) 108'
Manager:
(Italy) Luigi Radice

GK	1	(Italy) Gianluca Pagliuca
RB	2	(Germany) Hans-Peter Briegel	(substituted off) 26'
CB	5	(Italy) Pietro Vierchowod
CB	6	(Italy) Luca Pellegrini (c)	(substituted off) 28'
LB	3	(Italy) Moreno Mannini
RM	7	(Italy) Fausto Pari
CM	4	(Italy) Luca Fusi
CM	8	(Brazil) Toninho Cerezo
LM	9	(Italy) Fulvio Bonomi
CF	10	(Italy) Roberto Mancini	(substituted off) 114'
CF	11	(Italy) Gianluca Vialli
Substitutes:
DF		(Italy) Antonio Paganin	(substituted in) 26'
MF	15	(Italy) Fausto Salsano	(substituted in) 28'
FW		(Italy) Marco Branca	(substituted in) 114'
Manager:
(Socialist Federal Republic of Yugoslavia) Vujadin Boškov

== See also ==
- 1987–88 UC Sampdoria season
- 1987–88 Torino Calcio season
