= 2026 Coppa Italia final =

Football match in Rome, Italy

78th Coppa Italia Final
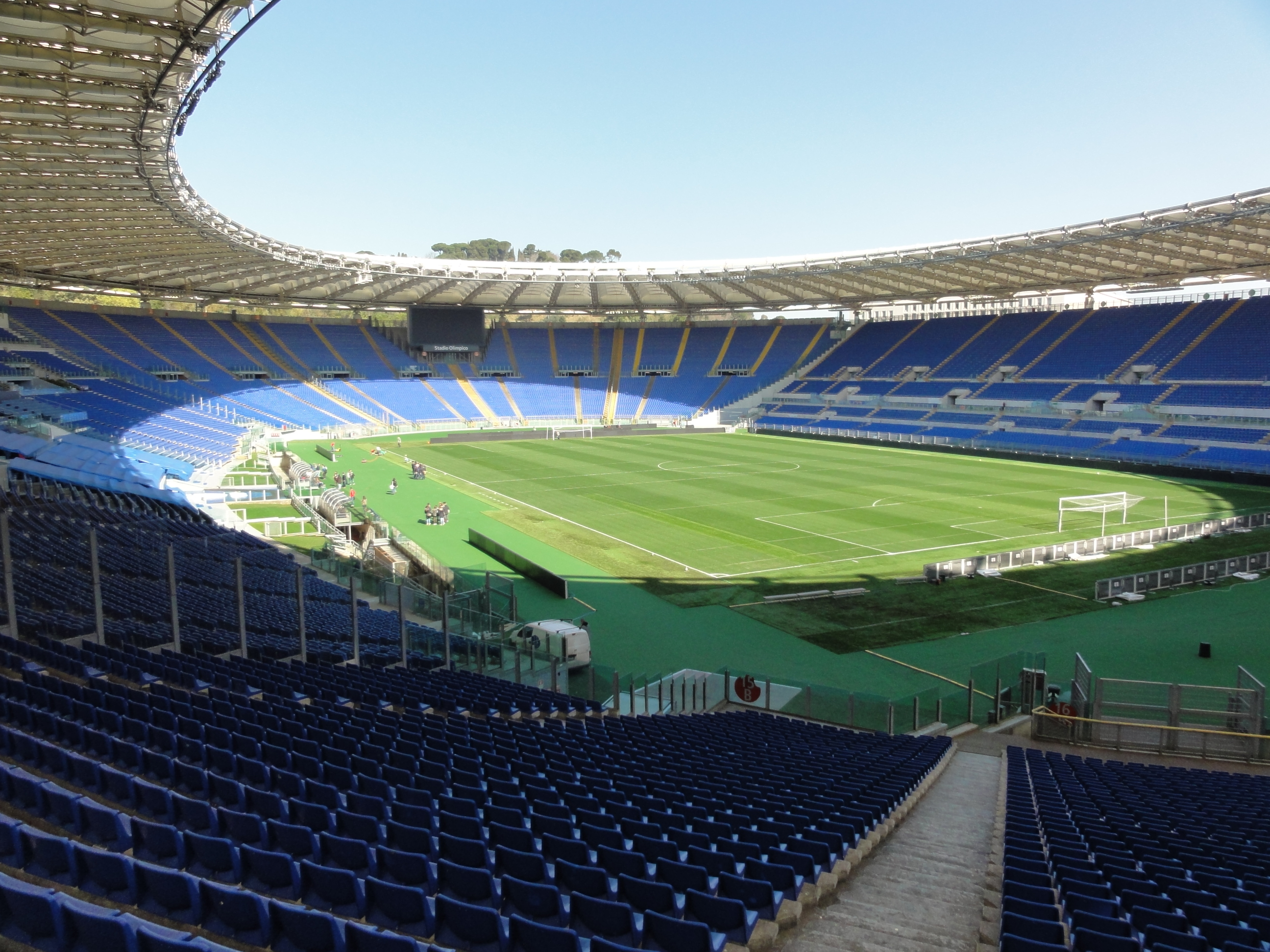
- The Stadio Olimpico in Rome hosted the final
- Event: 2025–26 Coppa Italia
Lazio	Internazionale
0	2
- Date: 13 May 2026
- Venue: Stadio Olimpico, Rome
- Man of the Match: Denzel Dumfries (Internazionale)
- Referee: Marco Guida
- Attendance: 68,729

The 2026 Coppa Italia final was the last match of the 2025–26 edition of the Coppa Italia, Italy's premier national football cup. It was played on 13 May 2026 between Lazio and Inter Milan in a repeat of the 2000 Coppa Italia final, which Lazio won over two legs, and the first single-leg UEFA Cup final two years prior, which Inter won.

== Background ==
Lazio had previously played in ten Coppa Italia finals, winning seven times. Their most recent final appearance was in 2019, defeating Atalanta in Rome. Inter had won nine of their 15 previous appearances in the cup final. Their most recent appearance was victory over Fiorentina in 2023. The two teams had met once before in the 2000 Coppa Italia final, where Lazio won over two legs to achieve its first and only double.

In reaching the final, both teams qualified for the 2026–27 Supercoppa Italiana.

== Road to the final ==
Note: In all results below, the score of the finalist is given first (H: home; A: away).

Lazio		Round	Internazionale
Opponent	Result	2025–26 Coppa Italia	Opponent	Result
Milan	1–0 (H)	Round of 16	Venezia	5–1 (H)
Bologna	1–1 (4–1 p) (A)	Quarter-finals	Torino	2–1 (H)
Atalanta	2–2 (H), 1–1 (a.e.t.) (2–1 p) (A) 3–3 agg. (2–1 p)	Semi-finals	Como	0–0 (A), 3–2 (H) 3–2 agg.

== Match ==
=== Details ===
13 May 2026
21:00 CEST

Lazio	0–2	Internazionale
	Report	Marušić 14' (o.g.); L. Martínez 35'

Stadio Olimpico, Rome
Attendance: 68,729
Referee: Marco Guida

Lazio	Internazionale

GK	40	(Italy) Edoardo Motta
RB	77	(Montenegro) Adam Marušić		(substituted off) 72'
CB	34	(Spain) Mario Gila	(yellow card) 38'
CB	13	(Italy) Alessio Romagnoli
LB	17	(Portugal) Nuno Tavares
CM	26	(Croatia) Toma Bašić		(substituted off) 78'
CM	4	(Spain) Patric		(substituted off) 46'
CM	24	(Netherlands) Kenneth Taylor
RF	18	(Denmark) Gustav Isaksen		(substituted off) 66'
CF	14	(Netherlands) Tijjani Noslin
LF	10	(Italy) Mattia Zaccagni (c)	(yellow card) 85'	(substituted off) 72'
Substitutes:
GK	55	(Italy) Alessio Furlanetto
GK	99	(Italy) Giacomo Giacomone
DF	3	(Italy) Luca Pellegrini
DF	23	(Albania) Elseid Hysaj
DF	25	(Denmark) Oliver Provstgaard
MF	6	(Italy) Nicolò Rovella		(substituted on) 46'
MF	7	(Nigeria) Fisayo Dele-Bashiru
MF	21	(Morocco) Reda Belahyane
MF	27	(Italy) Daniel Maldini
MF	29	(Italy) Manuel Lazzari		(substituted on) 72'
MF	32	(Italy) Danilo Cataldi
FW	9	(Spain) Pedro	(yellow card) 85'	(substituted on) 78'
FW	19	(Senegal) Boulaye Dia		(substituted on) 72'
FW	20	(Serbia) Petar Ratkov
FW	22	(Italy) Matteo Cancellieri		(substituted on) 66'
Manager:
(Italy) Maurizio Sarri

GK	13	(Spain) Josep Martínez
CB	31	(Germany) Yann Aurel Bisseck	(yellow card) 6'
CB	25	(Switzerland) Manuel Akanji
CB	95	(Italy) Alessandro Bastoni	(yellow card) 16'	(substituted off) 77'
RM	2	(Netherlands) Denzel Dumfries		(substituted off) 68'
CM	23	(Italy) Nicolò Barella	(yellow card) 85'
CM	7	(Poland) Piotr Zieliński
CM	8	(Croatia) Petar Sučić		(substituted off) 68'
LM	32	(Italy) Federico Dimarco	(yellow card) 85'
CF	9	(France) Marcus Thuram		(substituted off) 82'
CF	10	(Argentina) Lautaro Martínez (c)		(substituted off) 77'
Substitutes:
GK	1	(Switzerland) Yann Sommer
GK	12	(Italy) Raffaele Di Gennaro
DF	6	(Netherlands) Stefan de Vrij
DF	15	(Italy) Francesco Acerbi
DF	30	(Brazil) Carlos Augusto		(substituted on) 77'
DF	36	(Italy) Matteo Darmian
DF	43	(Italy) Matteo Cocchi
MF	11	(Brazil) Luis Henrique		(substituted on) 68'
MF	16	(Italy) Davide Frattesi
MF	17	(France) Andy Diouf		(substituted on) 82'
MF	20	(Turkey) Hakan Çalhanoğlu
MF	22	(Armenia) Henrikh Mkhitaryan		(substituted on) 68'
FW	14	(Ivory Coast) Ange-Yoan Bonny		(substituted on) 77'
FW	48	(Italy) Mattia Mosconi
FW	94	(Italy) Pio Esposito
Manager:
(Romania) Cristian Chivu

Man of the Match:
Denzel Dumfries (Internazionale)

Assistant referees:
Stefano Alassio
Giovanni Baccini
Fourth official:
Luca Zufferli
Reserve assistant referee:
Fabiano Preti
Video assistant referee:
Paolo Mazzoleni
Assistant video assistant referee:
Aleandro Di Paolo

Match rules

- 90 minutes.
- 30 minutes of extra time if necessary.
- Penalty shoot-out if scores still level.
- Fifteen named substitutes.
- Maximum of five substitutions, with a sixth allowed in extra time. (Note: Each team was given only three opportunities to make substitutions, excluding substitutions made at half-time, before the start of extra time and at half-time in extra time.)
