= Amarildo (footballer, born 1939) =

Brazilian footballer (born 1939)

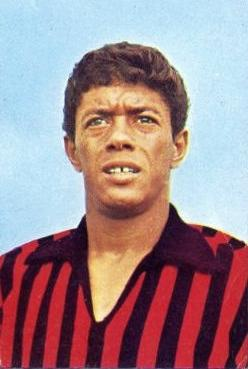
- Amarildo with Milan in 1965

Personal information
- Full name: Amarildo Tavares da Silveira
- Date of birth: 29 July 1939 (age 87)
- Place of birth: Campos dos Goytacazes, Brazil
- Height: 1.69 m (5 ft 7 in)
- Position: Striker

Youth career
- 1956–1957: Goytacaz
- 1958: Flamengo

Senior career*
Years	Team	Apps	(Gls)
1958	Flamengo	0	(0)
1958–1963	Botafogo	85	(45)
1963–1967	AC Milan	107	(32)
1967–1970	Fiorentina	62	(16)
1970–1972	Roma	32	(10)
1973–1974	Vasco da Gama	7	(0)
Total		293	(103)

International career
1961–1966	Brazil	22	(7)

Managerial career
- 1981–1983: Sorso
- 1984–1987: Espérance de Tunis
- 1987–1988: Rondinella
- 1988–1990: Turris
- 1991–1992: Pontedera
- 2008: America
Medal record
Men's Football
Representing Brazil
FIFA World Cup
Winner	1962 Chile
- * Club domestic league appearances and goals

Amarildo Tavares da Silveira (Portuguese pronunciation: [amaˈɾiwdu]; born 29 July 1939), also known as Amarildo, is a Brazilian former footballer who played as a striker. He is the only living player who participated in the 1962 World Cup final.

== Club career ==
Amarildo began his career at in the youth teams at Goytacaz, being described at the best player Goytacaz have helped produce by Brazilian newspaper O Globo in 2017. In 1958, Amarildo joined Flamengo, playing six times in the Torneio Extra in June 1958, scoring once. Later that year, Amarildo joined Botafogo, scoring 136 goals in 201 appearances in all competitions, with his form at Botafogo gaining the attention of Brazil national team manager Aymoré Moreira.

In 1963, Amarildo was the subject of a transfer away from Brazil. Everton chairman John Moores identified Amarildo as a potential signing, willing to pay a transfer fee of £200,000, however Football League restrictions on the signing of foreign players meant the transfer fell through. Amarildo eventually signed for Italian club AC Milan, scoring 14 goals in 31 league appearances in his first season in Italy, as Milan finished third. Amarildo scored the only goal in the 1967 Coppa Italia Final against Padova; Milan's first Coppa Italia victory. Over the course of four seasons at Milan, Amarildo scored 32 league goals in 107 outings. In 1967, Amarildo signed for Fiorentina, winning Serie A with Fiorentina in his second season with the club, scoring six goals en route to the title. After three seasons at Fiorentina, Amarildo signed for Roma in 1970, scoring ten league goals in 32 appearances in the Italian capital. At the end of his career, Amarildo enjoyed a short stint at Vasco da Gama in the early 1970s, helping Vasco da Gama to win the 1974 Campeonato Brasileiro Série A.

== International career ==
In April 1961, Amarildo made his debut for Brazil.

At the 1962 FIFA World Cup, after an injury to Pelé in a group game against Czechoslovakia, Amarildo was chosen by Brazil manager Aymoré Moreira to replace him. On 6 June 1962, in Amarildo's first appearance in the tournament, he scored two second half goals in Brazil's final group game against Spain to ensure Brazil's qualification into the knockout phase. After retaining his place in the side for Brazil's quarter and semi-final victories, Amarildo started for Brazil in the final, equalising the scores at 1–1 in the 17th minute after Czechoslovakia had taken the lead two minutes earlier via Josef Masopust's strike. On 69 minutes, Amarildo assisted Zito's header to put Brazil 2–1 up, before Vavá sealed victory with twelve minutes remaining, confirming Brazil as World Cup winners. Amarildo's exploits at the 1962 World Cup gained him the nickname o possesso (the possessed) by Brazilian journalist Nelson Rodrigues.

In total, Amarildo appeared 22 times for Brazil, scoring seven goals.

== Coaching career ==
Following his retirement, Amarildo moved back to Italy, coaching Fiorentina's youth teams from 1974 to 1978. In 1978, Amarildo returned to another of his former clubs, Botafogo, coaching their youth teams until 1981. In 1981, Amarildo was named manager of Italian club Sorso, managing the club for two years. In 1984, Tunisian club Espérance de Tunis appointed Amarildo. In 1987, following his departure from Espérance, Amarildo was named manager of Italian side Rondinella. In 1988, after a year at Rondinella, Amarildo took up the reins at Turris for two years, before returning to Fiorentina as assistant manager to compatriot Sebastião Lazaroni. From 1991 to 1992, Amarildo had a brief spell at Pontedera as manager.

On 24 January 2008, Amarildo was hired as America's head coach. On 26 January 2008, in his first match as America's head coach, Volta Redonda beat América 4–2 at the Estádio Giulite Coutinho. He was sacked by America's board after managing the team for just a week.

== Personal life ==
In September 2011, Amarildo was diagnosed with throat cancer, before announcing he was cancer-free nine months later.

== Honours ==
Botafogo

- Rio-São Paulo Tournament: 1962
- Interstate Cup Champions Club: 1962
- Campeonato Carioca: 1961, 1962
- Tournoi de Paris: 1963

AC Milan

- Coppa Italia: 1966–67

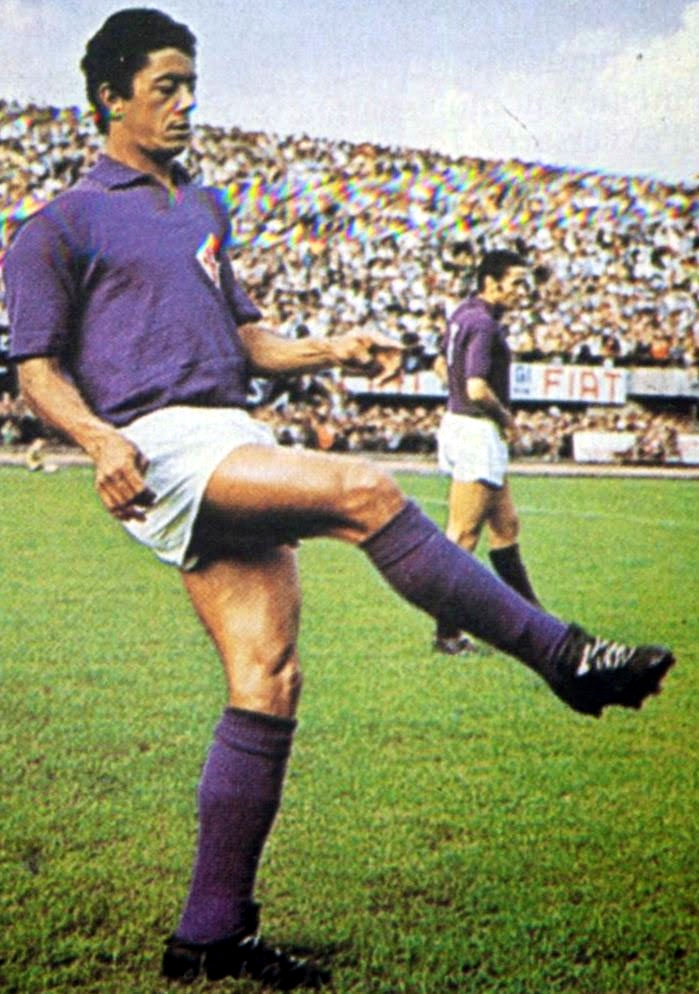
Amarildo playing for Fiorentina in the late 1960s

Fiorentina

- Serie A: 1968–69

Vasco da Gama

- Campeonato Brasileiro Série A: 1974

Brazil

- FIFA World Cup: 1962

Individual

- Player of the Tournament of Paris: 1963
- Scorer of the Club World Championship: 1963
- Scorer of the Brazilian Championship: 1962
- Scorer of the Rio-São Paulo Tournament: 1962
- Scorer of Interstate Club Champions Cup: 1962
- Scorer of Pentagonal International Clubs: 1962
- State Championship's top scorer: 1961
- Scorer of the International Tournament in Costa Rica: 1961
