= Riccardo Lattanzi =

Italian football referee (1934–1991)

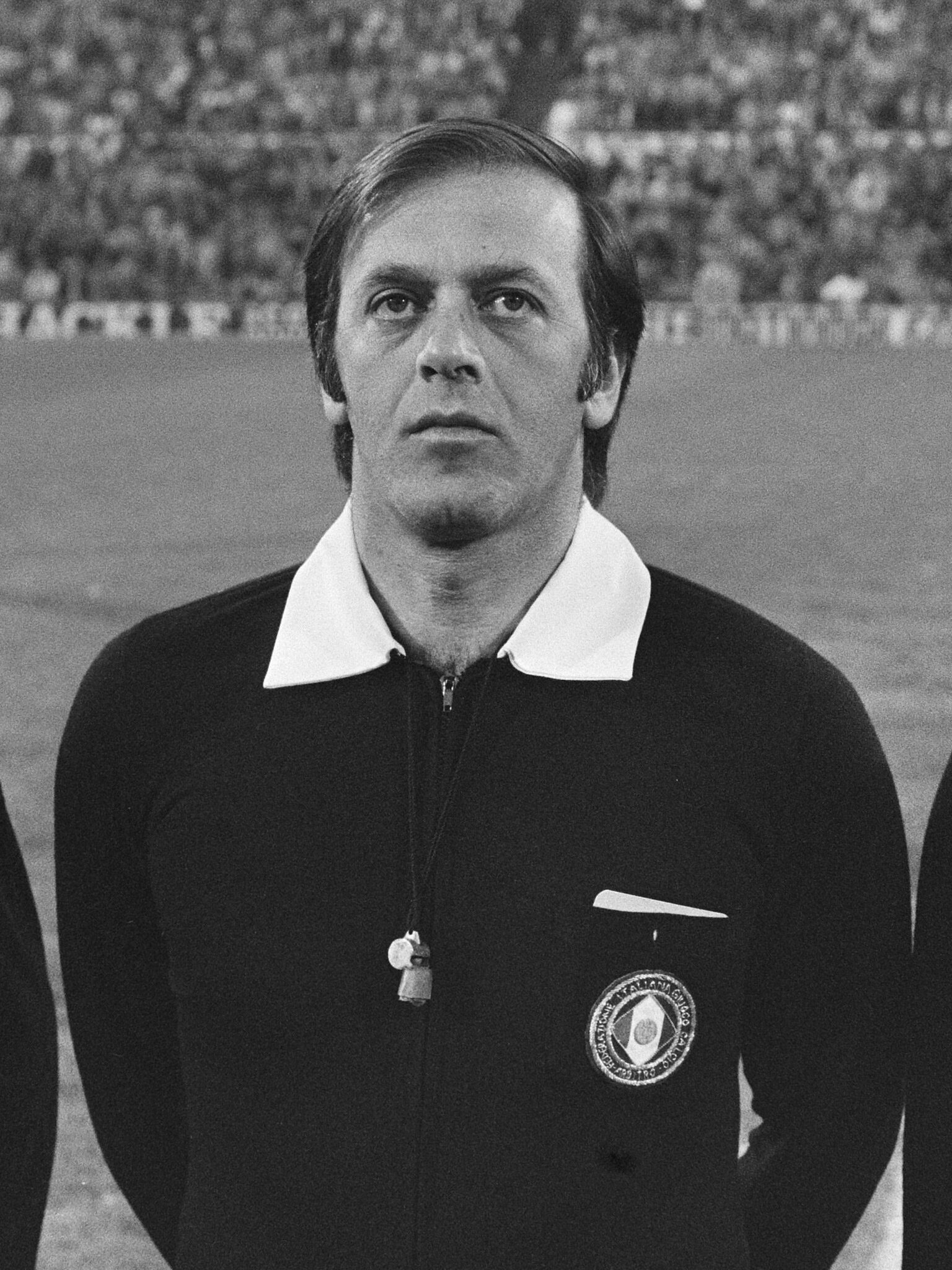
- Lattanzi in 1974
- Born: 10 April 1934; Ancona, Italy
- Died: 13 July 1991 (aged 57); Rome, Italy

Riccardo Lattanzi (10 April 1934 – 13 July 1991) was an Italian international football referee.

Throughout his career, he officiated the 1976 Coppa Italia final, and the 1981 European Cup Winners' Cup final.

== Major matches refereed ==
Date	Match	Tournament	Venue	Result	Ref
13 May 1981	Dinamo Tbilisi vs. Carl Zeiss Jena	1981 European Cup Winners' Cup final	Rheinstadion, Düsseldorf	2–1	
