= Dirceu =

Brazilian footballer (1952-1995)

- Dirceu with Avellino in the 1986–87 season

Personal information
- Full name: Dirceu José Guimarães
- Date of birth: 15 June 1952
- Place of birth: Curitiba, Brazil
- Date of death: 15 September 1995 (aged 43)
- Place of death: Rio de Janeiro, Brazil
- Height: 1.72 m (5 ft 8 in)
- Position: Attacking midfielder

Senior career*
Years	Team	Apps	(Gls)
1970–1972	Coritiba	26	(1)
1973–1976	Botafogo	52	(9)
1976	Fluminense	22	(2)
1977–1978	Vasco da Gama	25	(2)
1978–1979	América	45	(2)
1979–1982	Atlético Madrid	84	(18)
1982–1983	Verona	29	(2)
1983–1984	Napoli	30	(5)
1984–1985	Ascoli	27	(5)
1985–1986	Como	25	(2)
1986–1987	Avellino	23	(6)
1988	Vasco da Gama	-	(-)
1988	Miami Sharks	17	(5)
1989–1991	Ebolitana	39	(14)
1992	Benevento	11	(4)
1995	Atlético Yucatán		

International career
1973–1986	Brazil	44	(7)
- * Club domestic league appearances and goals

Dirceu José Guimarães, known as Dirceu (Portuguese pronunciation: [dʒiʁˈsew]; 15 June 1952 – 15 September 1995), was a Brazilian professional footballer who played as an attacking midfielder, notably for Botafogo and the Brazil national team as well as numerous Italian teams in the 1980s–early 1990s.

== Biography ==
Dirceu was born at Curitiba, in southern Brazil, on 15 June 1952.

== Club career ==
In his early career, Dirceu played for Coritiba, Botagofo (1971–1975), Fluminense (1975–1977) and Vasco da Gama in his country, before spending one year in Mexico at América. In 1979, he signed for Spanish side Atlético Madrid, where he remained until 1982, playing 84 games and scoring 18 goals. In 1982, he signed for Italian team Hellas Verona, the first of five Italian Serie A teams which he changed yearly (the last being Avellino in 1986–1987), before returning to Vasco da Gama. In 1988 Dirceu played in the USA for Fort Lauderdale Strikers, and in 1989–1991 he played again in southern Italy, this time for Ebolitana (1989–1992) and Benevento (1991–1992). His last teams was Atlético Yucatán in Mexico, where he ended his career in 1995.

== International career ==
Dirceu vs Mario Kempes in the 1978 World Cup match Argentina v Brazil

Dirceu won 44 caps (14 non-official), between June 1973 and May 1986, with the Brazil national team, scoring seven goals.

He played for Brazil at the 1974, 1978, and 1982 FIFA World Cups. He was due to go to the 1986 edition of the tournament, but was ruled out by injury.

He played 11 games and scored three goals in his World Cup appearances. Brazil finished fourth in 1974, while in 1978, he won the Bronze Ball and was named to the team of the tournament after helping Brazil to a third-place finish. He also took part at the 1972 Summer Olympic Games with Brazil.

== Death ==
Dirceu died on the night of 15 September 1995, at the age of 43, when an Opel Ascona driven by a street racer ran a red light and hit his Puma at high speed in Barra da Tijuca, not too far from his apartment. Dirceu and a passenger, who was thrown out of the vehicle following the crash, died immediately. There were two couples in the Ascona; all four of them survived and nobody was prosecuted for Dirceu's death.

== Legacy ==
The Ebolitana named its arena at Eboli the Stadio José Guimarães Dirceu in his honor.

== Honours ==
Coritiba

- Campeonato Paranaense: 1971, 1972

Fluminense

- Campeonato Carioca: 1976

Vasco da Gama

- Campeonato Carioca: 1977, 1988

Hellas Verona

- Coppa Italia runner-up: 1983

Brazil

- FIFA World Cup: third place 1978, fourth place 1974

Individual

- 1978 FIFA World Cup: All-Star Team
- 1978 FIFA World Cup: Bronze Ball
- South American Player of the Year: Bronze award 1978
- Serie A Team of The Year: 1986
