= 1979 Coppa Italia final =

31st Coppa Italia final
- Event: 1978–79 Coppa Italia
Juventus	Palermo
2	1
- After extra time
- Date: 20 June 1979
- Venue: Stadio San Paolo, Naples
- Referee: Enzo Barbaresco
- Attendance: 40,000

The 1979 Coppa Italia final was the final of the 1978–79 Coppa Italia. The match was played on 20 June 1979 between Juventus and Palermo. Juventus won 2–1 after extra time.

== Match ==
17 May 1979
20:30

Juventus	2–1 (a.e.t.)	Palermo
Brio 83'; Causio 117'		Chimenti 1'

Stadio Olimpico, Rome
Attendance: 40,000
Referee: Enzo Barbaresco

Juventus	Palermo

GK	1	(Italy) Dino Zoff
RB	2	(Italy) Claudio Gentile
LB	3	(Italy) Antonio Cabrini
CM	4	(Italy) Giuseppe Furino
CB	5	(Italy) Francesco Morini	(substituted off) 50'
SW	6	(Italy) Gaetano Scirea (c)
RW	7	(Italy) Franco Causio
CM	8	(Italy) Marco Tardelli
CF	9	(Italy) Pietro Paolo Virdis	(substituted off) 50'
AM	10	(Italy) Romeo Benetti
SS	11	(Italy) Roberto Bettega
Substitutes:
CB	13	(Italy) Sergio Brio	(substituted in) 50'
CF	15	(Italy) Roberto Boninsegna	(substituted in) 50'
Manager:
(Italy) Giovanni Trapattoni

GK	1	(Italy) Lorenzo Frison
SW	2	(Italy) Giovanni Gregorio
SW	3	(Italy) Filippo Citterio
DF	4	(Italy) Francesco Brignani
DF	5	(Italy) Mauro Di Cicco
DF	6	(Italy) Fausto Silipo	(substituted off) 75'
CM	7	(Italy) Riccardo Maritozzi
CM	8	(Italy) Pasqualino Borsellino
FW	9	(Italy) Vito Chimenti (c)
CF	10	(Italy) Guido Magherini	(substituted off) 47'
CF	11	(Italy) Andrea Conte
Substitutes:
DF	13	(Italy) Ignazio Arcoleo	(substituted in) 75'
MF	15	(Italy) Carlo Osellame	(substituted in) 47'
Manager:
(Italy) Fernando Veneranda

== See also ==
- 1978–79 Juventus FC season
