= Alberto Michelotti =

Italian footballer and referee (1930–2022)

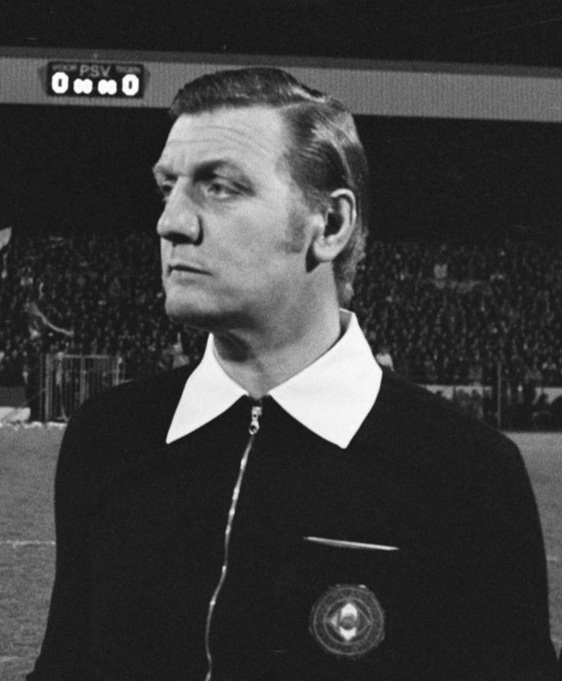
- Michelotti in 1975

Personal information
- Date of birth: 15 July 1930
- Place of birth: Parma, Italy
- Date of death: 18 January 2022 (aged 91)
- Position: Goalkeeper

Youth career
- 1945–1946: Giovane Italia
- 1946–1947: Parma
- 1948–1949: Parma

Senior career*
Years	Team	Apps	(Gls)
1947–1948	Parma Vecchia		
1949–1950	Borgotarese	11	(0)
1950–1952	Colorno		
1952–1953	Fidenza		
1953–1954	Folgore Piaden		
1954–1955	Bozzolese		
Refereeing career
Domestic
Years	League	Role
1967–1981	Serie A	Referee
International
Years	League	Role
1973–1981	FIFA listed	Referee
- * Club domestic league appearances and goals

Alberto Michelotti (15 July 1930 – 18 January 2022) was an Italian football player and referee.

== Career ==
Michelotti began his career in football as a goalkeeper, before becoming a referee in Serie A in 1967. In 1973, Michelotti was appointed a FIFA referee.

At club level, Michelotti officiated the 1975 Coppa Italia Final between Fiorentina and Milan in Rome on 28 June; the former side won the match 3–2. He was also in charge of refereeing the second leg of the 1979 UEFA Cup Final between Borussia Mönchengladbach and Red Star Belgrade, on 23 May at the Rheinstadion, Düsseldorf, which ended in a 1–0 home victory to the former club, which in turn saw the German side claim the title 2–1 on aggregate.

The following season, he also officiated the 1980 Coppa Italia Final between Roma and Torino in Rome on 17 May, which ended in 3–2 penalty shoot-out victory to the former team following a 0–0 draw after extra-time. He officiated the third Coppa Italia final of his career in the following year, against the same two opponents, the second leg of a 1–1 draw on 17 June, in Turin; following a 2–2 aggregate draw after extra-time, Roma once again prevailed on penalties, winning 4–2.

At international level, in 1976, Michelotti was appointed a referee for the 1976 Summer Olympics, where he officiated two matches. Four years later, Michelotti was appointed a referee for UEFA Euro 1980, where he officiated a group stage match between Czechoslovakia and West Germany. Michelotti retired from officiating in 1981.

== Personal life and death ==
Michelotti died on 18 January 2022, at the age of 91.

== Major matches refereed ==
Date	Match	Tournament	Venue	Result	Ref
23 May 1979	Borussia Mönchengladbach vs. Red Star Belgrade	1979 UEFA Cup final (second leg)	Rheinstadion, Düsseldorf	1–0 (2–1 on aggregate)	

== Honours ==
- Italian Football Hall of Fame: 2019
- Giovanni Mauro Award for Best Italian International Referee of the Season: 1974
