= 1982 Coppa Italia final =

34th Coppa Italia final
- Event: 1981–82 Coppa Italia
Internazionale	Torino
2	1

First leg
Internazionale	Torino
1	0
- Date: 5 May 1982
- Venue: San Siro, Milan
- Referee: Paolo Bergamo

Second leg
Torino	Internazionale
1	1
- Date: 20 May 1982
- Venue: Stadio Communale, Turin
- Referee: Giancarlo Redini

The 1982 Coppa Italia final was the final of the 1981–82 Coppa Italia. The match was played over two legs on 5 and 20 May 1982 between Internazionale and Torino. Internazionale won 2–1 on aggregate.

== First leg ==
5 May 1982
20:45

Internazionale	1–0	Torino
Serena 40'

San Siro, Milan
Referee: Paolo Bergamo

Internazionale	Torino

GK	1	(Italy) Ivano Bordon
SW	6	(Italy) Graziano Bini
CB	5	(Italy) Giuseppe Bergomi
CB	2	(Italy) Giuseppe Baresi (c)
RM	7	(Italy) Salvatore Bagni	(substituted off) 86'
CM	4	(Italy) Giampiero Marini
CM	10	(Italy) Evaristo Beccalossi
LM	3	(Italy) Gabriele Oriali
AM	8	(Austria) Herbert Prohaska
CF	11	(Italy) Aldo Serena
CF	9	(Italy) Alessandro Altobelli
Substitutes:
FW		(Italy) Giancarlo Centi	(substituted on) 86'
Manager:
(Italy) Eugenio Bersellini

GK	1	(Italy) Giuliano Terraneo	(substituted off) 62'
RB	2	(Italy) Agatino Cuttone
CB	2	(Netherlands) Michel van de Korput
SW	5	(Italy) Renato Zaccarelli
CB	4	(Italy) Luigi Danova (c)
LB	6	(Italy) Paolo Beruatto
DM	10	(Italy) Giacomo Ferri
CM	8	(Italy) Franco Ermini
AM	9	(Italy) Giuseppe Dossena
RW	10	(Italy) Dante Bertoneri
FW	11	(Italy) Paolino Pulici	(substituted off) 76'
Substitutes:
GK		(Italy) Renato Copparoni	(substituted on) 62'
MF		(Italy) Alessandro Loris Bonesso	(substituted on) 76'
Manager:
(Italy) Massimo Giacomini

== Second leg ==
20 May 1982
20:30

Torino	1–1	Internazionale
Cuttone 13'		Altobelli 23'

Stadio Communale, Turin
Referee: Giancarlo Redini

Torino	Internazionale

GK	1	(Italy) Renato Copparoni
RB	2	(Italy) Agatino Cuttone
CB	3	(Italy) Luigi Danova (c)
SW	5	(Netherlands) Michel van de Korput
LB	6	(Italy) Paolo Beruatto
RM	8	(Italy) Dante Bertoneri
DM	4	(Italy) Giacomo Ferri
LM	8	(Italy) Franco Ermini	(substituted off) 84'
AM	9	(Italy) Giuseppe Dossena
FW	7	(Italy) Alessandro Bonesso
FW	11	(Italy) Pietro Mariani	(substituted off) 73'
Substitutes:
GK		(Italy) Claudio Sclosa	(substituted on) 84'
MF		(Italy) Adelino Zennaro	(substituted on) 73'
Manager:
(Italy) Massimo Giacomini

GK	1	(Italy) Ivano Bordon
RB	2	(Italy) Giuseppe Bergomi
SW	6	(Italy) Graziano Bini
CB	5	(Italy) Nazzareno Canuti
LB	3	(Italy) Giuseppe Baresi (c)
RM	7	(Italy) Salvatore Bagni
DM	4	(Italy) Giampiero Marini
DM	9	(Italy) Gabriele Oriali
AM	10	(Italy) Evaristo Beccalossi	(substituted off) 79'
AM	8	(Austria) Herbert Prohaska
FW	11	(Italy) Alessandro Altobelli
Substitutes:
FW		(Italy) Aldo Serena	(substituted on) 79'
Manager:
(Italy) Eugenio Bersellini

== See also ==
- 1981–82 Inter Milan season
