= 1991 Coppa Italia final =

43rd Coppa Italia final
- Event: 1990–91 Coppa Italia
Roma	Sampdoria
4	2

First leg
Roma	Sampdoria
3	1
- Date: 30 May 1991
- Venue: Stadio Olimpico, Rome
- Referee: Pierluigi Pairetto
- Attendance: 55,067

Second leg
Sampdoria	Roma
1	1
- Date: 9 June 1991
- Venue: Stadio Luigi Ferraris, Genoa
- Referee: Arcangelo Pezzella
- Attendance: 36,577

The 1991 Coppa Italia final was the final of the 1990–91 Coppa Italia. The match was played over two legs on 30 May and 9 June 1991 between Roma and Sampdoria. Roma won 4–2 on aggregate.

== First leg ==
30 May 1991
18:00

Roma	3–1	Sampdoria
Pellegrini 12' (o.g.); Berthold 35'; Völler 40' (pen.)		Katanec 29'

Stadio Olimpico, Rome
Attendance: 55,067
Referee: Pierluigi Pairetto

Roma	Sampdoria

GK	1	(Italy) Giovanni Cervone
RB	2	(Italy) Stefano Pellegrini
CB	5	(Brazil) Aldair	(yellow card) 60'
CB	6	(Italy) Sebastiano Nela
LB	3	(Italy) Amedeo Carboni
DM	4	(Germany) Thomas Berthold
DM	8	(Italy) Fabrizio Di Mauro
RW	7	(Italy) Stefano Desideri
AM	10	(Italy) Giuseppe Giannini (c)		(substituted off) 83'
LW	11	(Italy) Ruggiero Rizzitelli		(substituted off) 76'
CF	9	(Germany) Rudi Völler
Substitutes:
FW		(Italy) Roberto Muzzi		(substituted on) 76'
DF		(Italy) Manuel Gerolin		(substituted on) 83'
Manager:
(Italy) Ottavio Bianchi

GK	1	(Italy) Gianluca Pagliuca
RB	2	(Italy) Moreno Mannini
CB	6	(Italy) Luca Pellegrini (c)
CB	5	(Italy) Pietro Vierchowod
LB	3	(Socialist Federal Republic of Yugoslavia) Srečko Katanec	(substituted off) 84'
RM	7	(Italy) Attilio Lombardo
CM	4	(Italy) Fausto Pari
CM	8	(Brazil) Toninho Cerezo
LM	11	(Italy) Giuseppe Dossena	(substituted off) 84'
CF	10	(Italy) Roberto Mancini
CF	9	(Italy) Gianluca Vialli
Substitutes:
MF		(Italy) Ivano Bonetti	(substituted on) 84'
MF		(Italy) Giovanni Invernizzi	(substituted on) 84'
Manager:
(Socialist Federal Republic of Yugoslavia) Vujadin Boškov

== Second leg ==
9 June 1991
18:00

Sampdoria	1–1	Roma
Aldair 79' (o.g.)		Völler 56' (pen.)

Stadio Luigi Ferraris, Genoa
Attendance: 36,577
Referee: Arcangelo Pezzella

Sampdoria	Roma

GK	1	(Italy) Gianluca Pagliuca
RB	2	(Italy) Moreno Mannini
CB	6	(Italy) Marco Lanna		(substituted off) 62'
CB	5	(Italy) Pietro Vierchowod	(c) (yellow card) 14'
LB	3	(Socialist Federal Republic of Yugoslavia) Srečko Katanec
RM	7	(Italy) Attilio Lombardo
CM	4	(Italy) Fausto Pari
CM	8	(Brazil) Toninho Cerezo
LM	11	(Italy) Giovanni Invernizzi		(substituted off) 56'
CF	10	(Italy) Roberto Mancini
CF	9	(Italy) Gianluca Vialli
Substitutes:
MF	15	(Soviet Union) Oleksiy Mykhaylychenko		(substituted on) 56'
FW	16	(Italy) Marco Branca		(substituted on) 62'
Manager:
(Socialist Federal Republic of Yugoslavia) Vujadin Boškov

GK	1	(Italy) Giovanni Cervone
RB	2	(Italy) Stefano Pellegrini
CB	5	(Brazil) Aldair
CB	6	(Italy) Sebastiano Nela
LB	3	(Italy) Amedeo Carboni
DM	4	(Italy) Manuel Gerolin
DM	8	(Italy) Fabrizio Di Mauro
RW	7	(Italy) Stefano Desideri	(yellow card) 31'
AM	10	(Italy) Giuseppe Giannini (c)		(substituted off) 67'
LW	11	(Italy) Ruggiero Rizzitelli	(yellow card) 45'
CF	9	(Germany) Rudi Völler	(yellow card) 77'	(substituted off) 83'
Substitutes:
DF	13	(Italy) Antonio Tempestilli		(substituted on) 67'
MF	15	(Italy) Fausto Salsano		(substituted on) 83'
Manager:
(Italy) Ottavio Bianchi

== See also ==
- 1990–91 UC Sampdoria season
- 1990–91 AS Roma season
