= 1962 Coppa Italia final =

14th Coppa Italia final
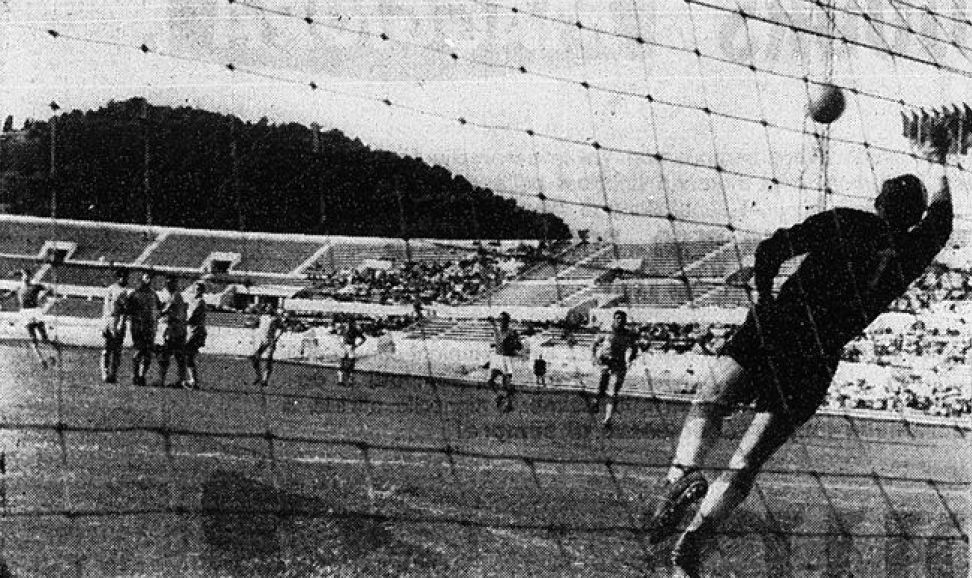
- Napoli's Corelli scores from a free kick
- Event: 1961–62 Coppa Italia
Napoli	SPAL
2	1
- Date: 21 June 1962
- Venue: Stadio Olimpico, Rome
- Referee: Pietro Bonetto

The 1962 Coppa Italia final was the final of the 1961–62 Coppa Italia. The match was played on 21 June 1962 between Napoli and SPAL. Napoli won 2–1; it was their first victory.

== Match ==
21 June 1962

Napoli	2–1	SPAL
Corelli 12'; Ronzon 78'		Micheli 16'

Stadio Olimpico, Rome
Referee: Pietro Bonetto

Napoli	SPAL

GK	1	(Italy) Walter Pontel	(substituted off) 46'
DF	2	(Italy) Mauro Gatti
DF	3	(Italy) Giovanni Molino
MF	4	(Italy) Achille Fraschini
MF	5	(Italy) Antonio Girardo
MF	6	(Italy) Rosario Rivellino
MF	7	(Italy) Pierluigi Ronzon
MF	8	(Italy) Ugo Tomeazzi
FW	9	(Italy) Gianni Corelli
FW	10	(Italy) Amos Mariani
FW	11	(Argentina) (Italy) Juan Carlos Tacchi
Substitutes:
GK	12	(Italy) Pacifico Cuman	(substituted in) 46'
Manager:
(Argentina) (Italy) Bruno Pesaola

GK	1	(Italy) Edo Patregnani
DF	2	(Italy) Sergio Cervato
DF	3	(Italy) Manlio Muccini
DF	4	(Italy) Gennaro Olivieri
DF	5	(Italy) Osvaldo Riva
MF	6	(Italy) Adolfo Gori
MF	7	(Argentina) (Italy) Oscar Massei
MF	8	(Italy) Carlo Dell'Omodarme
FW	9	(Italy) Dante Micheli
FW	10	(Italy) Silvano Mencacci
FW	11	(Italy) Carlo Novelli
Manager:
(Italy) Serafino Montanari
