= 1968 Coppa Italia final =

1968 Coppa Italia Final group 20th Coppa Italia final
1967–68 Coppa Italia
- Date: 13–30 June 1968

Final positions
- Champions: Torino
- Runners-up: Milan
- Third place: Internazionale
- Fourth place: Bologna

The 1968 Coppa Italia final was a final group of the 1967–68 Coppa Italia. From 1968 to 1971, FIGC introduced a final group instead of semi-finals and finals. In the final group, four teams played against each other home-and-away in a round-robin format. The matches were played from 13 to 30 June 1968. The group winner was Torino.

== Background ==
Coppa Italia began in 1922, although the first edition didn't include the best teams and the tournament would, after one edition, pause until 1926 when it was reintroduced only to be abandon before finished. In 1935, however, the tournament was more successfully arranged, but after seven editions it would halt due to the Second World War. It was not resumed until 1958, but has thereafter remained as a prestigious competition in Italian football for many decades.

== Matches ==
13 June 1968	Internazionale	3–3	Bologna	San Siro, Milan
	Ardizzon 55'; Cappellini 67'; Bedin 75'		Tentorio 3'; Pace 42'; Clerici 51'	Referee: Bruno de Marchi

13 June 1968	Torino	0–0	Milan	Stadio Comunale di Torino, Turin
				Referee: Antonio Sbardella

16 June 1968	Internazionale	0–0	Milan	San Siro, Milan
				Referee: Fabio Monti

16 June 1968	Bologna	1–1	Torino	Stadio Renato Dall'Ara, Bologna
	Turra 63'		Janich 58'	Referee: Giorgio Genel

19 June 1968	Torino	1–0	Internazionale	Stadio Comunale di Torino, Turin
	Dotti 28'			Referee: Paolo Toselli

19 June 1968	Milan	2–1	Bologna	San Siro, Milan
	Prati 42'; Sormani 89'		Pace 7'	Referee: Aurelio Angonese

23 June 1968	Bologna	0–2	Internazionale	Stadio Renato Dall'Ara, Bologna
			Suárez 6'; Facchetti 30'	Referee: Fulvio Pieroni

23 June 1968	Milan	1–1	Torino	San Siro, Milan
	Prati 6'		Facchin 88'	Referee: Antonio Di Tonno

26 June 1968	Milan	4–2	Internazionale	San Siro, Milan
	Sormani 30'; Hamrin 42'; Schnellinger 78'; Rosato 86'		Nielsen 3'; Achilli 66'	Referee: Mario Bernardis

26 June 1968	Torino	4–0	Bologna	Stadio Comunale di Torino, Turin
	Ferrini 10' 14' 44'; Combin 73'			Referee: Francesco Francescon

30 June 1968	Bologna	2–1	Milan	Stadio Renato Dall'Ara, Bologna
	Schnellinger 46' (o.g.); Turra 88'		Prati 61'	Referee: Concetto Lo Bello

30 June 1968	Internazionale	0–2	Torino	San Siro, Milan
			Fossati 17'; Combin 45'	Referee: Alessandro D'Agostini

== Final group ==
Pos	Team	Pld	W	D	L	GF	GA	GD	Pts
1	Torino	6	3	3	0	9	2	+7	9
2	Milan	6	2	3	1	8	6	+2	7
3	Internazionale	6	1	2	3	7	10	−3	4
4	Bologna	6	1	2	3	6	12	−6	4

== See also ==
- 1967–68 AC Milan season
- 1967–68 Inter Milan season
