= 1969 Coppa Italia final =

1969 Coppa Italia Final group 21st Coppa Italia final
1968–69 Coppa Italia
- Date: 30 April – 29 June 1969

Final positions
- Champions: Roma
- Runners-up: Cagliari
- Third place: Foggia
- Fourth place: Torino

The 1969 Coppa Italia final was the final group of the 1968–69 Coppa Italia. From 1968 to 1971, FIGC introduced a final group instead of semi-finals and finals. In the final group, four teams played against each other home-and-away in a round-robin format. The matches were played from 30 April – 29 June 1969. The group winner was Roma.

== Matches ==
30 April 1969	Torino	2–2	Foggia	Stadio Comunale di Torino, Turin

21 May 1969	Foggia	1–1	Cagliari	Stadio Pino Zaccheria, Foggia

31 May 1969	Roma	1–1	Cagliari	Stadio Olimpico, Rome

4 June 1969	Roma	3–0	Foggia	Stadio Olimpico, Rome

8 June 1969	Torino	2–2	Roma	Stadio Comunale di Torino, Turin

14 June 1969	Cagliari	2–0	Torino	Stadio Amsicora, Cagliari

19 June 1969	Foggia	2–2	Torino	Stadio Pino Zaccheria, Foggia

21 June 1969	Cagliari	1–2	Roma	Stadio Amsicora, Cagliari

24 June 1969	Cagliari	2–3	Foggia	Stadio Amsicora, Cagliari
	Riva 5'; Boninsegna 76' (pen.)		Camozzi 37' (pen.); Rolla 71'; Saltutti 87'	Referee: Ezio Motta

25 June 1969	Roma	0–0	Torino	Stadio Olimpico, Rome
				Referee: Giorgio Genel

28 June 1969	Torino	1–2	Cagliari	Stadio Comunale di Torino, Turin
	Zignoli 63' (o.g.)		Riva 27'; Brugnera 53'	Referee: Luciano Giunti

29 June 1969	Foggia	1–3	Roma	Stadio Pino Zaccheria, Foggia
	Saltutti 73'		Cappelli 14'; Capello 47'; Peiró 56'	Referee: Aurelio Angonese

== Final group ==
Pos	Team	Pld	W	D	L	GF	GA	GD	Pts
1	Roma	6	3	3	0	11	5	+6	9
2	Cagliari	6	2	2	2	9	8	+1	6
3	Foggia	6	1	3	2	9	13	−4	5
4	Torino	6	0	4	2	7	10	−3	4
