= 1940 Coppa Italia final =

6th Coppa Italia final
- Event: 1939–40 Coppa Italia
Fiorentina	Genova 1893
1	0
- Date: 15 June 1940
- Venue: Stadio Giovanni Berta, Florence

The 1940 Coppa Italia final was the final of the 1939–40 Coppa Italia. The match was played on 15 June 1940 between Fiorentina and Genova 1893. Fiorentina won 1–0.

== Match ==
15 June 1940

Fiorentina	1–0	Genova 1893
Celoria 26'

Stadio Giovanni Berta, Florence

Fiorentina	Genova 1893

GK	1	(Italy) Luigi Griffanti
DF	2	(Italy) Giorgio Da Costa
DF	3	(Italy) Carlo Piccardi
MF	4	(Italy) Giuseppe Bigogno
MF	5	(Italy) Mario Celoria
MF	6	(Italy) Giacinto Ellena
MF	7	(Italy) Arrigo Morselli
MF	8	(Italy) Gipo Poggi
FW	9	(Italy) Giuseppe Baldini
FW	10	(Italy) Romeo Menti
FW	11	(Italy) Giuliano Tagliasacchi
Manager:
(Italy) Giuseppe Galluzzi

GK	1	(Italy) Carlo Ceresoli
DF	2	(Italy) Michele Borelli
DF	3	(Italy) Sergio Marchi
DF	4	(Italy) Giorgio Michelini
DF	5	(Italy) Vittorio Sardelli
MF	6	(Italy) Mario Genta
MF	7	(Italy) Giacomo Neri
FW	8	(Italy) Bruno Arcari
FW	9	(Italy) Sergio Bertoni
FW	10	(Brazil) Elisio Gabardo
FW	11	(Argentina) Tomas Garibaldi
Manager:
(England) William Garbutt
