= Luigi Agnolin =

Italian football referee

- Born: 21 March 1943; Bassano del Grappa, Kingdom of Italy
- Died: 29 September 2018 (aged 75); Rome, Italy
- Other occupation: Physical education teacher

Domestic
| Years | League | Role |
| 1973–1992 | Serie A | Referee |

International
| Years | League | Role |
| 1978–1991 | FIFA-listed | Referee |

Luigi Agnolin (21 March 1943 – 29 September 2018) was an Italian football referee.

== Life and career ==
Agnolin was born in Bassano del Grappa in 1943. He was mostly known for supervising four matches across two editions of the FIFA World Cup: three in 1986 and one in 1990. At club level, he also refereed the 1986 European Super Cup final between Steaua București and Dynamo Kyiv(1–0), the 1987 European Cup Winners' Cup final between Ajax and 1. FC Lokomotive Leipzig, and the 1988 European Cup Final between PSV Eindhoven and S.L. Benfica. Domestically, he took charge of 226 matches in the Italian Serie A, as well as the return legs of the 1985 (Sampdoria–Milan) and 1988 Coppa Italia finals (Torino–Sampdoria).

In addition to his two World Cup tournaments, Agnolin also served as a referee in qualifiers for the World Cups of 1982, 1986, and 1990. He officiated in qualifying for Euro 1984. Agnolin is known to have worked as a FIFA referee during the period from 1980 to 1990.

Agnolin was also a futsal referee, officiating at the 1989 FIFA Futsal World Championship in the Netherlands.

In 2012, he was inducted into the Italian Football Hall of Fame.

Agnolin died on 29 September 2018.

== Major matches refereed ==
| Date | Match | Tournament | Venue | Result | Ref |
|---|---|---|---|---|---|
| 24 February 1987 | Steaua București vs. Dynamo Kyiv | 1986 European Super Cup final | Stade Louis II, Monaco | 1–0 | |
| 13 May 1987 | Ajax vs. 1. FC Lokomotive Leipzig | 1987 European Cup Winners' Cup final | Olympic Stadium, Athens | 1–0 | |
| 25 May 1988 | PSV Eindhoven vs. Benfica | 1988 European Cup final | Neckarstadion, Stuttgart | 0–0 a.e.t. (6–5 on penalties) | |

== Honours ==
- Italian Football Hall of Fame: 2012
- Giovanni Mauro Award for Best Italian International Referee of the Season: 1980

| Preceded by UEFA Cup Winners' Cup Final 1986 (Austria) Franz Wöhrer | UEFA Cup Winners' Cup Final Referees; Final 1987 (Italy) Luigi Agnolin | Succeeded by UEFA Cup Winners' Cup Final 1988 (West Germany) Dieter Pauly |
