= Paolo Bergamo =

Italian football referee (born 1943)

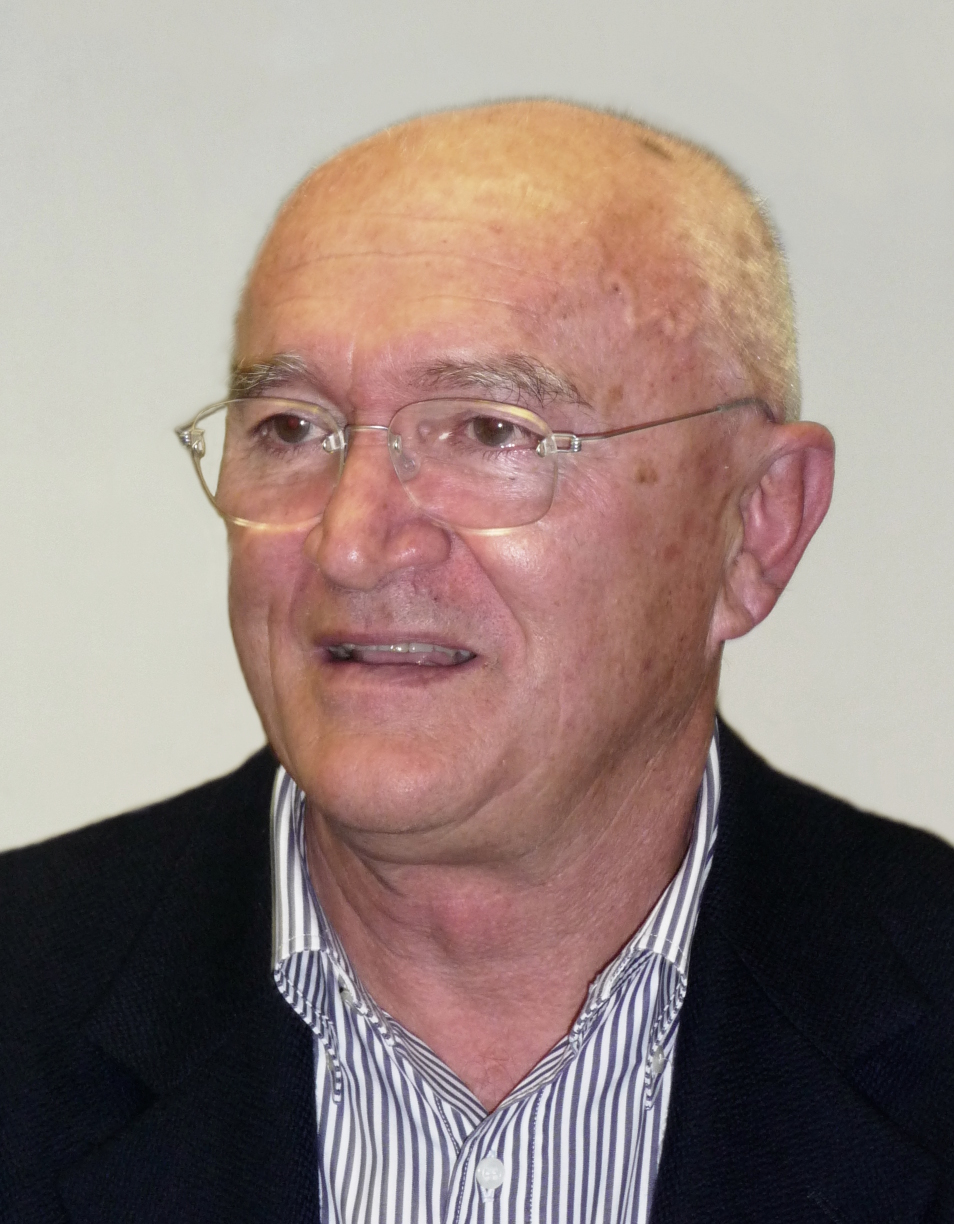
Paolo Bergamo

Paolo Bergamo (born 21 April 1943) is an Italian former football referee. He is better known as the former Italian Football Federation (FIGC) referee designator with Pierluigi Pairetto from 1999 to 2005, and who was implicated in the 2006 Italian football scandal.

== Life and career ==
Bergamo was born in Livorno in 1943. After initially playing as a footballer for Carrarese, he began his refereeing career following a knee injury, making his debut in Serie A on 12 October 1975, in match between Cagliari and Ascoli. He became an international referee in 1978, and officiated the final of the 1979 Mediterranean Games, between Yugoslavia and France.

Bergamo officiated the first leg of the 1982 Coppa Italia final, between Inter and Torino. He later officiated at UEFA Euro 1984, supervising the semi-final between France and Portugal. His additional competitions include qualifiers for the 1982 World Cup, 1986 World Cup, and Euro 1984. He is known to have served as a FIFA referee during the period from 1981 to 1985, officiating 52 international matches throughout his career. In total he officiated 155 Serie A matches throughout his career.

He later served as part of the UEFA's refereeing committee, and served as the Italian Football Federation (FIGC) referee designator for Serie A and Serie B with Pierluigi Pairetto from 1999 to 2005; both were implicated in the 2006 Calciopoli scandal, and Bergomo resigned from his position on 4 July 2006.

== Honours ==
- Premio Giovanni Mauro: 1980–81
