= 1967 Coppa Italia final =

19th Coppa Italia final
- Event: 1966–67 Coppa Italia
Milan	Padova
1	0
- Date: 14 June 1967
- Venue: Stadio Olimpico, Rome
- Referee: Mario Bernardis

The 1967 Coppa Italia final was the final of the 1966–67 Coppa Italia. The match was played on 14 June 1967 between Milan and Padova. Milan won 1–0.

== Match ==
14 June 1967

Milan	1–0	Padova
Amarildo 49'

Stadio Olimpico, Rome
Referee: Mario Bernardis

AC Milan	Padova

GK	1	(Italy) Pierangelo Belli
DF	2	(Italy) Angelo Anquilletti
DF	3	(Italy) Bruno Baveni
DF	4	(Germany) Karl-Heinz Schnellinger
DF	5	(Italy) Giovanni Trapattoni
DF	6	(Italy) Sergio Maddè
MF	7	(Italy) Gianni Rivera (c)
MF	8	(Italy) Giovanni Lodetti
FW	9	(Brazil) Amarildo
FW	10	(Italy) Giuliano Fortunato
FW	11	(Italy) Bruno Mora
Manager:
(Italy) Arturo Silvestri

GK	1	(Italy) Walter Pontel
DF	2	(Italy) Valeriano Barbiero
DF	3	(Italy) Cristiano Cervato
DF	4	(Italy) Giorgio Barbolini (c)
MF	5	(Italy) Alberto Bigon
AM	6	(Italy) Achille Fraschini
DM	7	(Italy) Rinaldo Frezza
MF	8	(Italy) Giorgio Sereni	(substituted off) 54'
FW	9	(Italy) Italo Carminati
FW	10	(Italy) Paolo Morelli
FW	11	(Italy) Alberto Novelli
Substitutes:
MF		(Italy) Mauro Gatti	(substituted in) 54'
Manager:
(Argentina) Humberto Rosa

== See also ==
- 1966–67 AC Milan season
