= 1983 Coppa Italia final =

35th Coppa Italia final
- Event: 1982–83 Coppa Italia
Hellas Verona	Juventus
2	3

First leg
Hellas Verona	Juventus
2	0
- Date: 19 June 1983
- Venue: Stadio Marcantonio Bentegodi, Verona
- Referee: Rosario Lo Bello

Second leg
Juventus	Hellas Verona
3	0
- After extra time
- Date: 22 June 1983
- Venue: Stadio Comunale, Turin
- Referee: Carlo Longhi

The 1983 Coppa Italia final was the final of the 1982–83 Coppa Italia. The match was played over two legs on 19 and 22 June 1983 between Juventus and Hellas Verona. Juventus won after extra time 3–2 on aggregate.

== First leg ==
19 June 1983
20:30

Hellas Verona	2–0	Juventus
Penzo 44'; Volpati 51'

Stadio Marcantonio Bentegodi, Verona
Referee: Rosario Lo Bello

Hellas Verona	Juventus

GK	1	(Italy) Claudio Garella
RB	2	(Italy) Emidio Oddi
CB	5	(Italy) Mario Guidetti
CB	6	(Italy) Roberto Tricella (c)
LB	3	(Italy) Luciano Marangon
RW	7	(Italy) Pietro Fanna	(substituted off) 76'
CM	4	(Italy) Domenico Volpati
CM	8	(Italy) Luigi Sacchetti
LW	10	(Brazil) Dirceu	(substituted off) 89'
AM	9	(Italy) Antonio Di Gennaro
CF	11	(Italy) Domenico Penzo	(substituted off) 87'
Substitutes:
FW		(Italy) Ezio Sella	(substituted in) 76'
FW		(Italy) Luigi Manueli	(substituted in) 87'
MF		(Italy) Adriano Fedele	(substituted in) 89'
Manager:
(Italy) Osvaldo Bagnoli

GK	1	(Italy) Luciano Bodini
RB	2	(Italy) Claudio Gentile
CB	5	(Italy) Sergio Brio
SW	6	(Italy) Gaetano Scirea (c)
LB	3	(Italy) Cesare Prandelli		(substituted off) 74'
CM	8	(Italy) Marco Tardelli
CM	4	(San Marino) Massimo Bonini
AM	10	(France) Michel Platini
RW	7	(Italy) Giuseppe Galderisi	(red card) 42'
CF	9	(Italy) Paolo Rossi
SS	11	(Poland) Zbigniew Boniek
Substitutes:
DF		(Italy) Massimo Storgato		(substituted in) 74'
Manager:
(Italy) Giovanni Trapattoni

== Second leg ==
22 June 1983
20:30

Juventus	3–0 (a.e.t.)	Hellas Verona
P.Rossi 8'; Platini 81', 119'

Stadio Comunale, Turin
Referee: Carlo Longhi

Juventus	Hellas Verona

GK	1	(Italy) Luciano Bodini
RB	2	(Italy) Claudio Gentile	Booked
CB	5	(Italy) Sergio Brio		(substituted off) 75'
SW	6	(Italy) Gaetano Scirea (c)
LB	3	(Italy) Antonio Cabrini
CM	8	(Italy) Marco Tardelli	Booked
CM	4	(San Marino) Massimo Bonini
AM	10	(France) Michel Platini
RW	7	(Italy) Domenico Marocchino
CF	9	(Italy) Paolo Rossi
SS	11	(Poland) Zbigniew Boniek	Booked
Substitutes:
DF		(Italy) Massimo Storgato		(substituted in) 75'
Manager:
(Italy) Giovanni Trapattoni

GK	1	(Italy) Claudio Garella
RB	2	(Italy) Emidio Oddi	Booked
CB	5	(Italy) Mario Guidetti	Booked
CB	6	(Italy) Roberto Tricella (c)
LB	3	(Italy) Luciano Marangon
RW	7	(Italy) Pietro Fanna
CM	4	(Italy) Domenico Volpati
CM	8	(Italy) Luigi Sacchetti
LW	10	(Brazil) Dirceu
AM	9	(Italy) Antonio Di Gennaro
CF	11	(Italy) Domenico Penzo
Manager:
(Italy) Osvaldo Bagnoli

== See also ==
- 1982–83 Juventus FC season
