= 1942–43 Coppa Italia =

Tournament details
- Country: Italy
- Dates: 13 September 1942 – 30 May 1943
- Teams: 34

Final positions
- Champions: Torino (2nd title)
- Runners-up: Venezia

Tournament statistics
- Matches played: 34
- Goals scored: 126 (3.71 per match)
- Top goal scorer(s): Bruno Ispiro; Valentino Mazzola; Vittorio Sentimenti (5 goals)

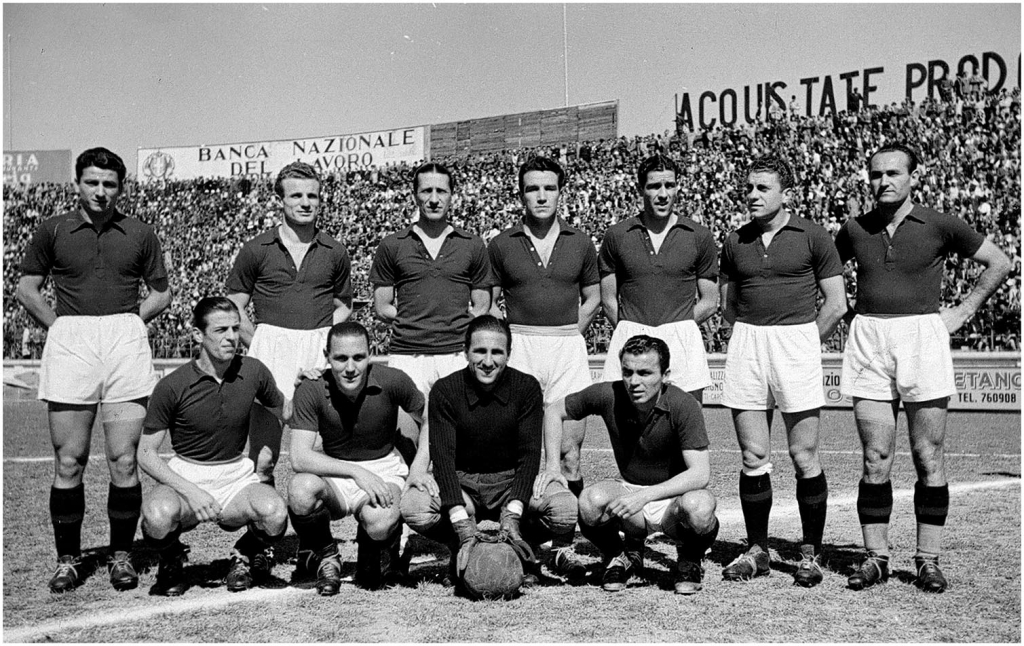
Torino’s team for the 1942-43 series

The 1942–43 Coppa Italia was the tenth edition of the tournament and the last before the suspension of football competitions in Italy due to World War II-related events. The Coppa Italia would only be restored in the summer of 1958.

All teams from Serie A (16) and Serie B (18) took part to this competition. After a short elimination round, 32 clubs were admitted to the final phase. All the matches were played in a single leg with eventual replay on the model of the FA Cup, homefields were decided by a draw except for the final match in Milan.

The trophy was won by Torino, which defeated 4–0 Venezia in the final match, played at the San Siro in Milan on May 30, 1943. This was Torino's second victory in the Coppa Italia. Top scorers of the competition were Bruno Ispiro (Genova 1893), Valentino Mazzola (Torino) and Vittorio Sentimenti (Juventus). Sentimenti scored all his 5 goals in the match against MATER.

Palermo–Juve, which won his round of 16 match because of Venezia forfeit, had been excluded from the competition before the round of 8 because of the imminent Allied invasion of Sicily.

== Serie B elimination round ==
Home team	Score	Away team
Cremonese	2–1	Brescia
Fanfulla	6–1	Savona

== Knockout stage ==
30 clubs are added.

Round of 32
Atalanta	3
Liguria	1
Torino	7
Anconitana-Bianchi	0
Livorno	2
Fiorentina	1
Padova	3
Milano	5
MATER	1
Juventus	6
Napoli	1
Lazio	2
Bari	0
Roma	3
Triestina	3
Fanfulla	0
Novara	1
Palermo–Juve (wo)	1
Venezia	2
Siena	1
Pisa	0
Cremonese	1
Udinese (aet)	2
Pescara	1
Modena	2
Alessandria	0
Bologna	2
Ambrosiana–Inter	0
Vicenza	3
Pro Patria	0
Genova 1893	5
Spezia	3

Round of 16
Atalanta	0
Torino	2
Livorno	2
Milano	3
Juventus	2
Lazio	3
Roma	2
Triestina	1
~~Palermo–Juve~~	~~2~~
Venezia	~~0~~
Cremonese	0
Udinese	1
Modena	0
Bologna	4
Vicenza	0
Genova 1893	1

Quarterfinals
Torino	5
Milano	0
Lazio	1
Roma	2
Venezia	3
Udinese	2
Bologna	2
Genova 1893	5

Semifinals
Torino	2
Roma	0
Venezia	3
Genova 1893	0

Final
Torino	4
Venezia	0

Legend

- 1942–43 Serie A teams
- 1942–43 Serie B teams

== Final ==
30 May 1943
16:00

Torino	4–0	Venezia
Ossola 22', 48'; Ferraris II 46'; Mazzola 52'

San Siro, Milan
Referee: Giuseppe Zelocchi

== Top goalscorers ==
Rank	Player	Club	Goals
1	(Italy) Bruno Ispiro	Genova 1893	5
1	(Italy) Valentino Mazzola	Torino	5
1	(Italy) Vittorio Sentimenti	Juventus	5
4	(Italy) Guglielmo Gabetto	Torino	4
5	(Italy) Gino Cappello	Milano	3
5	(Italy) Amedeo Biavati	Bologna	3
5	(Italy) Franco Ossola	Torino	3
5	(Uruguay) Juan Agostino Alberti	Venezia	3

== Sources ==
- Almanacco Illustrato del Calcio–La Storia 1898–2004, Panini Edizioni, Modena, September 2005
