= 1972 Coppa Italia final =

24th Coppa Italia final
- Event: 1971–72 Coppa Italia
Milan	Napoli
2	0
- Date: 5 July 1972
- Venue: Stadio Olimpico, Rome
- Referee: Paolo Toselli

The 1972 Coppa Italia final was the final of the 1971–72 Coppa Italia. The match was played on 5 July 1972 between Milan and Napoli. Milan won 2–0.

== Match ==
5 July 1972
21:00

Milan	2–0	Napoli
Panzanato 49' (o.g.); Rosato 78'

Stadio Olimpico, Rome
Referee: Paolo Toselli

Milan	Napoli

GK	1	(Italy) Fabio Cudicini
DF	2	(Italy) Angelo Anquilletti
DF	3	(Italy) Giulio Zignoli
MF	4	(Italy) Giuseppe Sabadini
MF	5	(Germany) Karl-Heinz Schnellinger
MF	6	(Italy) Roberto Rosato
RW	7	(Italy) Gianni Rivera (c)
CF	8	(Italy) Giorgio Biasiolo
CF	9	(Italy) Pierino Prati
CF	10	(Italy) Lino Golin	(substituted off) 46'
LW	11	(Italy) Alberto Bigon
Substitutes:
MF		(Italy) Guido Magherini	(substituted in) 46'	(substituted off) 75'
MF		(Italy) Aldo Maldera	(substituted in) 75'
Manager:
(Italy) Nereo Rocco

GK	1	(Italy) Dino Zoff (c)
RB	2	(Italy) Dino Panzanato
DF	3	(Italy) Mario Perego
DF	4	(Italy) Luigi Pogliana
DF	5	(Italy) Giacomo Vianello
LB	6	(Italy) Mario Zurlini
MF	7	(Italy) Giovanni Improta
MF	8	(Italy) Antonio Juliano
MF	9	(Italy) Mauro Pincelli	(substituted off) 56'
CF	10	(Italy) Emiliano Macchi
CF	11	(Italy) Angelo Sormani
Substitutes:
MF		(Italy) Andrea Esposito	(substituted in) 56'
Manager:
(Italy) Giuseppe Chiappella

== See also ==
- 1971–72 AC Milan season
