= Paolo Casarin =

Italian football referee

Paolo Casarin (born 12 May 1940 in Venice) is a retired football referee from Italy. He is mostly known for supervising two matches in the 1982 FIFA World Cup in Spain and overseeing rules and regulations throughout Europe.

== Life and career ==
Growing up in Mestre, near Venice, Casarin became a referee in 1958 and made his Serie A debut on 23 May 1971 (Bologna–Torino, 1–0); in 1979, he was appointed as an international referee. He officiated two mathces at the 1982 FIFA World Cup, and also officiated at UEFA Euro 1988, in addition to several matches in the 1982 and 1986 World Cup qualifiers. At club level, he also officiated the 1985 European Cup Winners' Cup final between Everton and Rapid Wien (3–1). He also officiated four Coppa Italia final matches throughout his career: both legs in 1984 (Verona–Roma), the first leg in 1986 (Sampdoria–Roma), and the first leg in 1988 (Sampdoria–Torino). In total, he officiated 200 matches in Serie A.

He retired from refereeing in 1988 and became the Serie A and Serie B referee designator in 1990, a post which he held until 1997. He also became part of the FIFA commission in 1992, and was a key advisor for the 1994 FIFA World Cup in the United States, overseeing rules and regulations throughout Europe. In 2012, he was inducted into the Italian Football Hall of Fame.

Outside of refereeing, Casarin worked as a chemical technician, and served as an official of SNAM, and later as a financial advisor.

== Major matches refereed ==
Date	Match	Tournament	Ref
15 May 1985	Everton vs. Rapid Wien (3–1)	1985 European Cup Winners' Cup final	

== Honours ==
- Italian Football Hall of Fame: 2012
- Premio Giovanni Mauro: 1977

Preceded by UEFA Cup Winners' Cup Final 1984 (East Germany) Adolf Prokop	UEFA Cup Winners' Cup Final Referees; Final 1985 (Italy) Paolo Casarin	Succeeded by UEFA Cup Winners' Cup Final 1986 (Austria) Franz Wöhrer
