= 1980 Coppa Italia final =

32nd Coppa Italia final
- Event: 1979–80 Coppa Italia
Roma	Torino
0	0
- After extra time Roma won 3–2 on penalties
- Date: 17 May 1980
- Venue: Stadio Olimpico, Rome
- Referee: Alberto Michelotti

The 1980 Coppa Italia final was the final of the 1979–80 Coppa Italia. The match was played on 17 May 1980 between Roma and Torino. Roma won 3–2 on penalties after a 0–0 draw after extra time.

== Match ==
17 May 1980
17:30

Roma	0–0 (a.e.t.)	Torino
Penalties
Giovannelli (penalty missed); Conti (penalty scored); De Nadai (penalty missed); Di Bartolomei (penalty missed); Santarini (penalty scored); Ancelotti (penalty scored)	3–2	(penalty scored) Mandorlini; (penalty scored) Mariani; (penalty missed) Greco; (penalty missed) Graziani; (penalty missed) Pecci; (penalty missed) Zaccarelli

Stadio Olimpico, Rome
Referee: Alberto Michelotti

Roma	Torino

GK	1	(Italy) Franco Tancredi
RB	2	(Italy) Domenico Maggiora
CB	3	(Italy) Sergio Santarini (c)
CB	4	(Italy) Michele De Nadai
LB	5	(Italy) Maurizio Turone
RM	6	(Italy) Paolo Giovannelli
CM	7	(Italy) Romeo Benetti	(substituted off) 91'
CM	8	(Italy) Carlo Ancelotti
LM	9	(Italy) Bruno Conti
CF	10	(Italy) Mauro Amenta	(substituted off) 75'
CF	11	(Italy) Roberto Pruzzo
Substitutes:
MF		(Italy) Agostino Di Bartolomei	(substituted in) 91'
MF		(Italy) Roberto Scarnecchia	(substituted in) 75'
Manager:
(Sweden) Nils Liedholm

GK	1	(Italy) Giuliano Terraneo
DF	2	(Italy) Marco Masi
DF	3	(Italy) Luigi Danova
DF	4	(Italy) Salvatore Vullo
RM	5	(Italy) Renato Zaccarelli	(substituted off) 62'
CM	6	(Italy) Domenico Volpati
CM	7	(Italy) Patrizio Sala
CM	8	(Italy) Eraldo Pecci
LM	9	(Italy) Giuseppe Greco
CF	10	(Italy) Paolino Pulici (c)	(substituted off) 96'
CF	11	(Italy) Francesco Graziani
Substitutes:
DM		(Italy) Andrea Mandorlini	(substituted in) 62'
DF		(Italy) Pietro Mariani	(substituted in) 96'
Manager:
(Italy) Ercole Rabitti
