= 1943 Coppa Italia final =

9th Coppa Italia final
- Event: 1942–43 Coppa Italia
Torino	Venezia
4	0
- Date: 30 May 1943
- Venue: San Siro, Milan
- Referee: Giuseppe Zelocchi

The 1943 Coppa Italia final was the final of the 1942–43 Coppa Italia. The match was played on 30 May 1943 between Torino and Venezia. Torino won 4–0.

== Match ==
30 May 1943
16:00

Torino	4–0	Venezia
Ossola 22', 48'; Ferraris II 46'; Mazzola 52'

San Siro, Milan
Referee: Giuseppe Zelocchi

Torino	Venezia

GK	1	(Italy) Alfredo Bodoira
DF	2	(Italy) Sergio Piacentini
DF	3	(Italy) Osvaldo Ferrini
MF	4	(Italy) Cesare Gallea
MF	5	(Italy) Giacinto Ellena
MF	6	(Italy) Giuseppe Grezar
FW	7	(Italy) Franco Ossola
FW	8	(Italy) Ezio Loik
FW	9	(Italy) Guglielmo Gabetto
FW	10	(Italy) Valentino Mazzola
FW	11	(Italy) Pietro Ferraris II
Manager:
(Italy) Antonio Janni

GK	1	(Italy) Giuseppe Eberle
DF	2	(Uruguay) Víctor Tortora
DF	3	(Italy) Silvio Di Gennaro
DF	4	(Italy) Felice Arienti
MF	5	(Italy) Sandro Puppo
MF	6	(Italy) Lidio Stefanini
FW	7	(Italy) Amedeo Degli Esposti
FW	8	(Italy) Bruno Novello
FW	9	(Italy) Francesco Pernigo
FW	10	(Italy) Walter Petron
FW	11	(Italy) Lanfranco Alberico
Manager:
(Hungarian People's Republic) János Vanicsek

== See also ==
- 1942–43 AC Torino season
