= 1970 Coppa Italia final =

1970 Coppa Italia Final group 22nd Coppa Italia final
1969–70 Coppa Italia
- Date: 7 May – 10 June 1970

Final positions
- Champions: Bologna
- Runners-up: Torino
- Third place: Cagliari
- Fourth place: Varese

The 1970 Coppa Italia final was a final group of the 1969–70 Coppa Italia. From 1968 to 1971, FIGC introduced a final group instead of semi-finals and finals. In the final group, four teams played against each other home-and-away in a round-robin format. The matches were played from 7 May – 10 June 1970. The group winner was Bologna.

As happened for the 1950 FIFA World Cup final, the development of the group created a de facto final in Bologna on 10 June 1970. Bologna played at home needing an obliged victory, that they achieved.

== Matches ==
7 May 1970	Varese	0–1	Bologna	Stadio Franco Ossola, Varese

7 May 1970	Cagliari	1–0	Torino	Sardegna Arena, Cagliari

13 May 1970	Bologna	0–0	Cagliari	Stadio Renato Dall'Ara, Bologna

13 May 1970	Torino	1–0	Varese	Stadio Comunale di Torino, Turin

20 May 1970	Varese	1–1	Cagliari	Stadio Franco Ossola, Varese

20 May 1970	Torino	1–0	Bologna	Stadio Comunale di Torino, Turin

27 May 1970	Bologna	4–1	Varese	Stadio Renato Dall'Ara, Bologna

27 May 1970	Torino	4–3	Cagliari	Stadio Comunale di Torino, Turin

2 June 1970	Cagliari	0–4	Bologna	Sardegna Arena, Cagliari
			Savoldi 24'; Nené 60' (o.g.); Bulgarelli 70' 85'	Referee: Aurelio Angonese

3 June 1970	Varese	0–3	Torino	Stadio Franco Ossola, Varese
			Ferrini 45'; Moschino 82' (pen.); Pavone 86'	Referee: Francesco Francescon

10 June 1970	Cagliari	0–0	Varese	Sardegna Arena, Cagliari
				Referee: Gaetano Mascali

10 June 1970 de facto Final	Bologna	2–0	Torino	Stadio Renato Dall'Ara, Bologna
	Savoldi 30' 40'			Referee: Alessandro D'Agostini

== Final group ==
Pos	Team	Pld	W	D	L	GF	GA	GD	Pts
1	Bologna	6	4	1	1	11	2	+9	9
2	Torino	6	4	0	2	9	6	+3	8
3	Cagliari	6	1	3	2	5	9	−4	5
4	Varese	6	0	2	4	2	10	−8	2

Source: rsssf.com
