= 1976 Coppa Italia final =

28th Coppa Italia final
- Event: 1975–76 Coppa Italia
Napoli	Hellas Verona
4	0
- Date: 29 June 1976
- Venue: Stadio Olimpico, Rome
- Referee: Riccardo Lattanzi

The 1976 Coppa Italia final was the final of the 1975–76 Coppa Italia. The match was played on 29 June 1976 between Napoli and Hellas Verona. Napoli won 4–0.

== Match ==
29 June 1976
20:30

Napoli	4–0	Hellas Verona
Ginulfi 76' (o.g.); Braglia 77'; Savoldi 79' 86'

Stadio Olimpico, Rome
Referee: Riccardo Lattanzi

Napoli	Hellas Verona

GK	1	(Italy) Pietro Carmignani
DF	2	(Italy) Giuseppe Bruscolotti
DF	3	(Italy) Antonio La Palma
DF	4	(Italy) Tarcisio Burgnich
DF	5	(Italy) Giovanni Vavassori
MF	6	(Italy) Andrea Orlandini
FW	7	(Italy) Giuseppe Massa
MF	8	(Italy) Antonio Juliano (c)
FW	9	(Italy) Giuseppe Savoldi
MF	10	(Italy) Salvatore Esposito
FW	11	(Italy) Giorgio Braglia
Manager:
(Italy) Alberto Delfrati

GK	1	(Italy) Alberto Ginulfi
DF	2	(Italy) Klaus Bachlechner (c)
DF	3	(Italy) Paolo Sirena
DF	5	(Italy) Sauro Catellani
DF	6	(Italy) Franco Nanni
MF	7	(Italy) Walter Franzot
MF	4	(Italy) Francesco Guidolin	(substituted off) 77'
FW	8	(Italy) Emiliano Mascetti
FW	9	(Italy) Livio Luppi	(substituted in) 67'
MF	10	(Italy) Adelio Moro
FW	11	(Italy) Gianfranco Zigoni
Substitutes:
MF		(Italy) Sergio Vriz	(substituted in) 77'
FW		(Italy) Emiliano Macchi	(substituted in) 67'
Manager:
(Italy) Ferruccio Valcareggi
