= Pasqualino Borsellino =

Italian footballer (born 1956)

Personal information
- Date of birth: 29 January 1956 (age 70)
- Place of birth: Ribera, Italy
- Height: 1.79 m (5 ft 10 in)
- Position: Midfielder

Senior career*
Years	Team	Apps	(Gls)
1975–1976	Palermo	3	(0)
1976–1977	Alcamo	28	(1)
1977–1981	Palermo	117	(8)
1981–1983	Ternana	60	(8)
1983–1985	Francavilla	62	(4)
1985–1986	Monopoli	18	(1)
- * Club domestic league appearances and goals

Pasqualino Borsellino (born 29 January 1956) is an Italian football manager and former player who played as a midfielder for several teams, including Palermo.
