= Giuseppe Lorenzo =

Italian footballer

Personal information
- Date of birth: 27 December 1964 (age 61)
- Place of birth: Catanzaro, Italy
- Height: 1.84 m (6 ft 0 in)
- Position: Forward

Youth career
- –1982: Catanzaro

Senior career*
| Years | Team | Apps | (Gls) |
| 1982–1985 | Catanzaro | | |
| 1985–1988 | Sampdoria | | |
| 1988–1990 | Cesena | | |
| 1990–1992 | Bologna | | |
| 1992–1993 | Taranto | | |
- * Club domestic league appearances and goals

Giuseppe Lorenzo (born 27 December 1964) is an Italian retired professional footballer who played as a forward. He currently holds the record for the fastest-ever sending off in a professional match; the non-professional record is held by English footballer David Pratt. Lorenzo was sent off after just 10 seconds on 9 December 1990 while playing for Bologna against Parma for striking an opponent. Lorenzo also played for Catanzaro, Sampdoria and Cesena in a career which lasted from 1982 to 1996. In 2007, The Times placed him at number 12 in their list of the 50 hardest footballers in history.
