= Alessandro Scanziani =

Italian footballer (born 1953)

Personal information
- Date of birth: 23 March 1953 (age 73)
- Place of birth: Verano Brianza, Italy
- Height: 1.78 m (5 ft 10 in)
- Position: Midfielder

Senior career*
Years	Team	Apps	(Gls)
1972–1973	Meda	26	(9)
1973–1977	Como	97	(18)
1973–1974	→ Livorno (loan)	30	(7)
1977–1979	Inter Milan	46	(8)
1979–1981	Ascoli	55	(12)
1981–1986	Sampdoria	152	(25)
1986–1988	Genoa	68	(9)
1988–1989	Arezzo	32	(1)

Managerial career
- 1995–1997: Como
- 1997–1998: Modena
- 1998–2000: Lumezzane
- 2000–2001: SPAL
- 2001–2002: Lecco
- 2003–2004: Pro Sesto
- 2009–2010: Pergocrema
- * Club domestic league appearances and goals

Alessandro Scanziani (born 23 March 1953) is an Italian professional football coach and a former player, who played as a midfielder.

== Playing career ==
Scanziani was born in Verano Brianza. He began his career at Meda before spending a season on loan at Livorno. Three seasons at Como followed, in which he won promotion to Serie A. Although he impressed as a skilful midfielder with an eye for goal, this could not prevent Como from being relegated. Scanziani joined Inter Milan a year later and played for two seasons.

A move to Ascoli in 1979 saw him form an outstanding midfield partnership with Gianfranco Bellotto and Adelio Moro. This trio accounted for a large share of Ascoli's goals over the next two seasons and led the side to a finish of 5th in 1980, the club's highest-ever placing.

He moved to Sampdoria in 1981 and helped the side to promotion, and played alongside Liam Brady in the team's midfield in Serie A. He later played for Genoa and Arezzo.
