= 2000 Coppa Italia final =

52nd Coppa Italia final
- Event: 1999–2000 Coppa Italia
Lazio	Internazionale
2	1

First leg
Lazio	Internazionale
2	1
- Date: 12 April 2000
- Venue: Stadio Olimpico, Rome
- Referee: Alfredo Trentalange
- Attendance: 35,000

Second leg
Internazionale	Lazio
0	0
- Date: 18 May 2000
- Venue: San Siro, Milan
- Referee: Gianluca Paparesta
- Attendance: 53,406

The 2000 Coppa Italia final decided the winner of the 1999–2000 Coppa Italia. It was played over two legs and won 2–1 on aggregate by Lazio over Internazionale. It was Lazio's fourth Coppa Italia Final and third win.

== First leg ==
12 April 2000
21:00

Lazio	2–1	Internazionale
Nedvěd 39'; Simeone 51'		Seedorf 7'

Stadio Olimpico, Rome
Attendance: 35,000
Referee: Alfredo Trentalange

Lazio	Internazionale

GK	22	(Italy) Marco Ballotta
RB	15	(Italy) Giuseppe Pancaro
CB	17	(Italy) Guerino Gottardi
CB	24	(Portugal) Fernando Couto	Booked
LB	11	(Federal Republic of Yugoslavia) Siniša Mihajlović
RM	7	(Portugal) Sérgio Conceição
CM	14	(Argentina) Diego Simeone		(substituted off) 81'
CM	6	(Argentina) Roberto Sensini
CM	18	(Czech Republic) Pavel Nedvěd
LM	20	(Federal Republic of Yugoslavia) Dejan Stanković		(substituted off) 55'
CF	21	(Italy) Simone Inzaghi		(substituted off) 76'
Substitutes:
SS	10	(Italy) Roberto Mancini		(substituted in) 55'
CF	9	(Chile) Marcelo Salas		(substituted in) 76'
CM	25	(Argentina) Matías Almeyda	Booked	(substituted in) 81'
Manager:
(Sweden) Sven-Göran Eriksson

GK	1	(Italy) Angelo Peruzzi
RB	6	(Italy) Michele Serena
CB	5	(France) Laurent Blanc
CB	21	(Colombia) Iván Córdoba
LB	2	(Italy) Christian Panucci
RM	4	(Argentina) Javier Zanetti (c)
CM	14	(Netherlands) Clarence Seedorf
CM	15	(France) Benoît Cauet
LM	7	(Italy) Francesco Moriero	Booked	(substituted off) 46'
RF	16	(Romania) Adrian Mutu		(substituted off) 58'
LF	10	(Italy) Roberto Baggio		(substituted off) 58'
Substitutes:
CM	23	(Italy) Luigi Di Biagio		(substituted in) 46'
LF	9	(Brazil) Ronaldo		(substituted in) 58'
RF	18	(Chile) Iván Zamorano		(substituted in) 58'
Manager:
(Italy) Marcello Lippi

MATCH OFFICIALS

- Assistant referees:
- Fourth official:

MATCH RULES

- 90 minutes.
- Seven named substitutes.
- Maximum of 3 substitutions.

== Second leg ==
18 May 2000
21:00

Internazionale	0–0	Lazio

San Siro, Milan
Attendance: 53,406
Referee: Gianluca Paparesta

Internazionale	Lazio

GK	1	(Italy) Angelo Peruzzi
RB	6	(Italy) Michele Serena	(substituted off) 67'
CB	5	(France) Laurent Blanc
CB	21	(Colombia) Iván Córdoba
LB	17	(Ivory Coast) Cyril Domoraud
RM	4	(Argentina) Javier Zanetti (c)
CM	23	(Italy) Luigi Di Biagio
CM	15	(France) Benoît Cauet
LM	14	(Netherlands) Clarence Seedorf
RF	18	(Chile) Iván Zamorano	(substituted off) 52'
LF	10	(Italy) Roberto Baggio	(substituted off) 62'
Substitutes:
RF	32	(Italy) Christian Vieri	(substituted in) 52'
LF	20	(Uruguay) Álvaro Recoba	(substituted in) 62'
LB	31	(Greece) Grigorios Georgatos	(substituted in) 67'
Manager:
(Italy) Marcello Lippi

GK	22	(Italy) Marco Ballotta
RB	15	(Italy) Giuseppe Pancaro	Booked	(substituted off) 87'
CB	2	(Italy) Paolo Negro
CB	13	(Italy) Alessandro Nesta (c)
LB	5	(Italy) Giuseppe Favalli
RM	7	(Portugal) Sérgio Conceição
CM	6	(Argentina) Roberto Sensini
CM	14	(Argentina) Diego Simeone	Booked
LM	23	(Argentina) Juan Sebastián Verón
SS	10	(Italy) Roberto Mancini		(substituted off) 46'
CF	21	(Italy) Simone Inzaghi		(substituted off) 46'
Substitutes:
CF	33	(Italy) Fabrizio Ravanelli		(substituted in) 46'
CF	9	(Chile) Marcelo Salas		(substituted in) 46'
CB	24	(Portugal) Fernando Couto		(substituted in) 87'
Manager:
(Sweden) Sven-Göran Eriksson

MATCH OFFICIALS

- Assistant referees:
- Fourth official:

MATCH RULES

- 90 minutes.
- Seven named substitutes.
- Maximum of 3 substitutions.
- If the scores are level at full-time, the winner is decided on the away goals rule.
- If the scores are still level, 30 minutes of extra time is played.
- If the scores remain level after extra time, there is a penalty shoot-out.

== See also ==
- 1999–2000 Inter Milan season
- 1999–2000 SS Lazio season
