= Eugenio Bersellini =

Italian footballer (1936–2017)

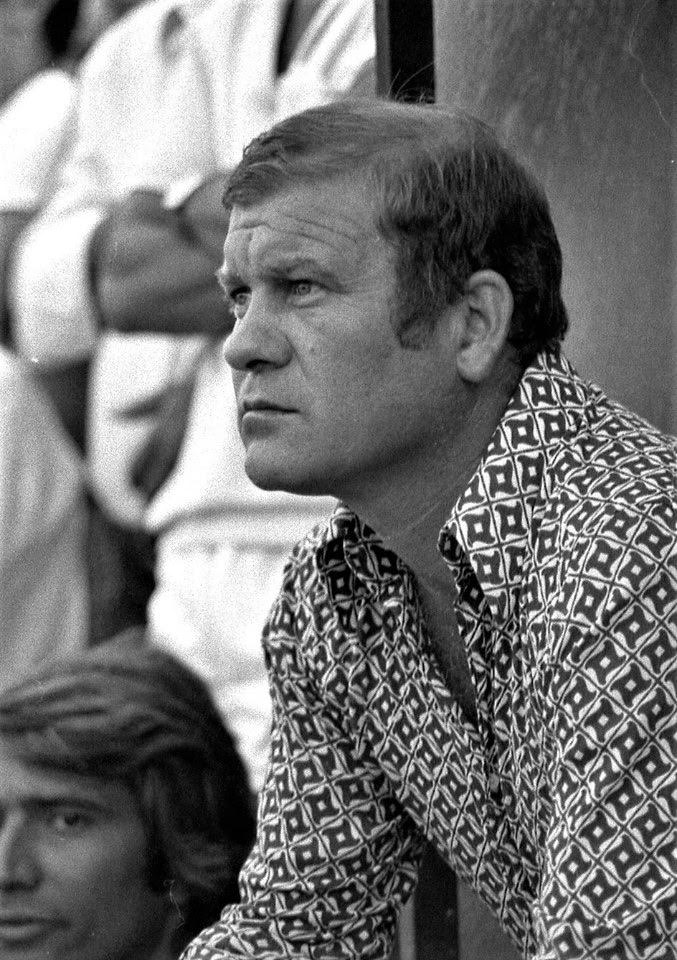
- Bersellini in 1973

Personal information
- Date of birth: 10 June 1936
- Place of birth: Borgo Val di Taro, Kingdom of Italy
- Date of death: 17 September 2017 (aged 81)
- Place of death: Prato, Italy
- Position: Midfielder

Senior career*
Years	Team	Apps	(Gls)
1954–1955	Fidenza		
1955–1960	Brescia	99	(20)
1960–1962	Monza	60	(8)
1962–1963	Pro Patria	17	(1)
1963–1966	Monza	70	(5)
1966–1968	Lecce	37	(4)

Managerial career
- 1969–1971: Lecce
- 1971–1973: Como
- 1973–1975: Cesena
- 1975–1977: Sampdoria
- 1977–1982: Inter Milan
- 1982–1984: Torino
- 1984–1986: Sampdoria
- 1986–1987: Fiorentina
- 1987–1988: Avellino
- 1988–1990: Ascoli
- 1990–1991: Como
- 1991–1992: Modena
- 1992–1993: Bologna
- 1994: Pisa
- 1995–1996: Saronno
- 1999: Libya
- 2001: Al Ahli Tripoli
- 2002: Al-Ittihad Tripoli
- 2006: Lavagnese
- * Club domestic league appearances and goals

Eugenio Bersellini (10 June 1936 – 17 September 2017) was an Italian football player and manager.

He was nicknamed Il sergente di ferro ("The iron sergeant") because of the very hard training sessions he used to impose on his players.

He coached the Inter Milan side that won the 1979–80 Serie A title and the Sampdoria that won their first ever piece of silverware, the 1984–85 Coppa Italia.

== Managerial career ==
Bersellini started his career as a manager at Lecce, having last played for the same club. His first job in Serie A was in 1973, when he managed Cesena. He remained there until 1975, then he moved to manage Sampdoria.

In 1977, he moved to Inter Milan, which represented the most decorated part of his managing career. In his first season, Inter won the 1977–78 Coppa Italia. In the 1979–80 season, Bersellini guided Inter to their twelfth Serie A title. He won another Coppa Italia for the Nerazzurri in the 1981–82 season.

He was one of the first to change the training methods and employ fitness staff, which was not common at the time.

== Honours ==
=== Manager ===
Inter Milan

- Coppa Italia: 1977–78, 1981–82
- Serie A: 1979–80

Sampdoria

- Coppa Italia: 1984–85

Al-Ittihad Tripoli

- Libyan Premier League: 2001–02

=== Individual ===
- Torino FC Hall of Fame: 2018
