= Luca Pellegrini (footballer, born 1963) =

Italian footballer

Personal information
- Date of birth: 24 March 1963 (age 63)
- Place of birth: Varese, Italy
- Height: 1.82 m (6 ft 0 in)
- Position: Defender

Senior career*
Years	Team	Apps	(Gls)
1978–1980	Varese	26	(1)
1980–1991	Sampdoria	275	(4)
1991–1993	Verona	51	(0)
1993–1994	Ravenna	38	(0)
1994–1995	Torino	14	(0)
Total		404	(5)

International career
1989	Italy B	1	(0)
- * Club domestic league appearances and goals

Luca Pellegrini (born 24 March 1963) is an Italian former professional footballer who played as a defender.

== Club career ==
Pellegrini was born in Varese. He played for 11 seasons (262 games, 3 goals) in the Serie A for U.C. Sampdoria, Hellas Verona F.C. and Torino F.C.

== International career ==
Pellegrini represented Italy at the 1988 Summer Olympics (a swimmer with the same name also represented Italy at those Olympics).

== Personal life ==
His younger brothers Davide Pellegrini and Stefano Pellegrini also played football professionally. To distinguish them, Luca was referred to as Pellegrini I, Davide as Pellegrini II and Stefano as Pellegrini III.

== Honours ==
Sampdoria

- Serie A: 1990–91
- Coppa Italia: 1984–85, 1987–88, 1988–89
- UEFA Cup Winners' Cup: 1989–90
