= 1985–86 AS Roma season =

Roma
1985–86 season
- President: Dino Viola
- Manager: Sven-Göran Eriksson
- Stadium: Stadio Olimpico
- Serie A: 2nd
- Coppa Italia: Winners
- Top goalscorer: League: Roberto Pruzzo (19); All: Roberto Pruzzo (20)
Home colours	Away colours

During the 1985–86 season AS Roma competed in Serie A and Coppa Italia.

== Summary ==
Associazione Sportiva Roma had a successful season, in which Sven-Göran Eriksson's typical Scandinavian tactical approach was able to improve Roma's fortunes to a level where they once again fought for the league title. They also won the Coppa Italia, but the chance of a double disappeared in a 3–2 loss at home to bottom side Lecce, which all but secured Juventus's title. The most important part in Roma's revival was an efficient midfield with several top-class players in addition to striker Roberto Pruzzo, with several playmakers providing multiple assists to league topscorer Pruzzo.

== Squad ==
Note: Flags indicate national team as defined under FIFA eligibility rules; some limited exceptions apply. Players may hold more than one non-FIFA nationality.

Pos.	Nation	Player
GK	ITA	Franco Tancredi
GK	ITA	Attilio Gregori
DF	ITA	Dario Bonetti
DF	ITA	Settimio Lucci
DF	ITA	Sebastiano Nela
DF	ITA	Emidio Oddi
DF	ITA	Ubaldo Righetti
MF	ITA	Manuel Gerolin
MF	ITA	Carlo Ancelotti

Pos.	Nation	Player
MF	BRA	Toninho Cerezo
MF	ITA	Bruno Conti
MF	ITA	Stefano Desideri
MF	ITA	Antonio Di Carlo
MF	ITA	Giuseppe Giannini
MF	ITA	Stefano Impallomeni
FW	POL	Zbigniew Boniek
FW	ITA	Roberto Pruzzo
FW	ITA	Francesco Graziani
FW	ITA	Sandro Tovalieri

=== Transfers ===
In
Pos.	Name	from	Type
FW	Zbigniew Boniek	Juventus	£3 mld
FW	Sandro Tovalieri	AC Arezzo	loan ended
MF	Manuel Gerolin	Udinese	
GK	Attilio Gregori	AC Reggiana	
DF	Marco Savorani	Piacenza	loan ended
MF	Stefano Desideri	Piacenza	loan ended
MF	Mark Tullio Strukelj	Pisa	loan ended

Out
Pos.	Name	To	Type
MF	Paulo Roberto Falcão	Sao Paulo FC	released
DF	Aldo Maldera	Fiorentina	
FW	Maurizio Iorio	Fiorentina	£4 mld
GK	Astutillo Malgioglio	SS Lazio	
GK	Pietro Pappalardo	Cagliari	
DF	Roberto Fois	FC Venezia	
DF	Stefano Mattiuzzo		
DF	Marco Savorani	Lodigiani	
DF	Maurizio Vincioni	Ancona	
MF	Ruben Buriani	SSC Napoli	
MF	Odoacre Chierico	Udinese	
MF	Angelo Di Livio	AC Reggiana	loan
MF	Marco Pizzoni	Atalanta	
MF	Mark Tullio Strukelj	Pisa	
FW	Roberto Antonelli	Genoa CFC	loan ended
FW	Stefano Sgherri	Barletta	

== Competitions ==
=== Serie A ===
==== League table ====
Pos	Team	Pld	W	D	L	GF	GA	GD	Pts	Qualification or relegation
1	Juventus (C)	30	18	9	3	43	17	+26	45	Qualification to European Cup
2	Roma	30	19	3	8	51	27	+24	41	Qualification to Cup Winners' Cup
3	Napoli	30	14	11	5	35	21	+14	39	Qualification to UEFA Cup
4	Torino	30	11	11	8	31	26	+5	33	Qualification to UEFA Cup
5	Fiorentina	30	10	13	7	29	23	+6	33	Qualification to UEFA Cup

Source: RSSSF.com
Rules for classification: 1) Points; 2) Head-to-head points; 3) Head-to-head goal difference; 4) Goal difference; 5) Goals scored; 6) Draw. (Note: Head-to-head record is used only after all the matches between the teams in question have been played).
(C) Champions

==== Results by round ====
Round	1	2	3	4	5	6	7	8	9	10	11	12	13	14	15	16	17	18	19	20	21	22	23	24	25	26	27	28	29	30
Ground	A	H	A	A	H	A	H	A	H	A	H	A	H	A	H	H	A	H	H	A	H	A	H	A	H	A	H	A	H	A
Result	W	W	L	D	W	L	W	L	W	L	W	L	W	W	D	W	W	W	W	W	W	D	W	L	W	W	W	W	L	L
Position	3	1	3	6	2	6	5	5	5	6	5	6	4	3	3	3	2	2	2	2	2	2	2	2	2	2	2	1	2	2

Source: http://calcio-seriea.net/allenatori_squadra/1985/903/
A = Away; H = Home; W = Win; D = Draw; L = Loss; = 1986–87 European Cup; = 1986–87 UEFA Cup

==== Matches ====
8 September 1985 1	Atalanta	1–2	Roma	Bergamo
16:00 CEST (UTC+02:00)	Magrin 90'	Report	Pruzzo 32'; Nela 77'	Stadium: Stadio Comunale; Referee: Maurizio Mattei

15 September 1985 2	Roma	1–0	Udinese	Rome
16:00 CEST (UTC+02:00)	Giannini 33'; Nela (red card) 73'	Report		Stadium: Stadio Olimpico; Referee: Arcangelo Pezzella

22 September 1985 3	Bari	2–0	Roma	Bari
16:00 CEST (UTC+02:00)	Rideout 62', 90+3'	Report		Stadium: Stadio della Vittoria; Referee: Pietro D'Elia

29 September 1985 4	Napoli	1–1	Roma	Naples
15:00 CEST (UTC+01:00)	Maradona 52' (pen.)	Report	Tovalieri 37'	Stadium: Stadio San Paolo; Referee: Claudio Pieri

6 October 1985 5	Roma	2–0	Torino	Rome
15:00 CEST (UTC+01:00)	Conti 41'; Tovalieri 87'	Report		Stadium: Stadio Olimpico; Referee: Rosario Lo Bello

13 October 1985 6	Avellino	1–0	Roma	Avellino
15:00 CEST (UTC+01:00)	Díaz 65'	Report		Stadium: Stadio Partenio; Referee: Paolo Casarin

20 October 1985 7	Roma	2–1	Fiorentina	Rome
14:30 CEST (UTC+01:00)	Cerezo 23', 76'	Report	Massaro 46'	Stadium: Stadio Olimpico; Referee: Maurizio Mattei

27 October 19845 8	Internazionale	2–1	Roma	Milan
14:30 CEST (UTC+01:00)	Altobelli 24'; Rummenigge 67'	Report	Boniek 79'; Pruzzo (red card) 90'; Righetti (red card) 90'	Stadium: San Siro; Referee: Luigi Agnolin

3 November 1985 9	Roma	2–1	Verona	Rome
14:30 CEST (UTC+01:00)	Ferroni 42' (o.g.); Nela 52'	Report	Elkjær 31'	Stadium: Stadio Olimpico; Referee: Pierluigi Magni

10 November 1985 10	Juventus	3–1	Roma	Turin
14:30 CEST (UTC+01:00)	Mauro 10'; M. Laudrup 58'; Serena 70'	Report	Pruzzo 37' (pen.)	Stadium: Stadio Comunale; Referee: Rosario Lo Bello

24 November 1985 11	Roma	2–1	Milan	Rome
14:30 CEST (UTC+01:00)	Conti 5'; Cerezo 36'	Report	Virdis 27'	Stadium: Stadio Olimpico; Referee: Claudio Pieri

1 December 1985 12	Sampdoria	1–0	Roma	Genoa
14:30 CEST (UTC+01:00)	Mannini 32'	Report		Stadium: Stadio Luigi Ferraris; Referee: Romeo Paparesta

8 December 1985 13	Roma	1–0	Pisa	Rome
14:30 CEST (UTC+01:00)	Boniek 26' (pen.)	Report		Stadium: Stadio Olimpico; Referee: Maurizio Mattei

15 December 1985 14	Lecce	0–3	Roma	Lecce
14:30 CEST (UTC+01:00)		Report	Bonetti 58'; Boniek 64'; Tovalieri 90'	Stadium: Stadio Via del Mare; Referee: Giancarlo Redini

22 December 1985 15	Roma	0–0	Como	Rome
14:30 CEST (UTC+01:00)		Report		Stadium: Stadio Olimpico; Referee: Arcangelo Pezzella

5 January 1986 16	Roma	4–0	Atalanta	Rome
14:30 CEST (UTC+01:00)	Boniek 44', 60'; Giannini 71'; Pruzzo 76'	Report		Stadium: Stadio Olimpico; Referee: Pierluigi Pairetto

12 January 1986 17	Udinese	0–2	Roma	Udine
14:30 CEST (UTC+01:00)		Report	Boniek 33'; Pruzzo 69'	Stadium: Stadio Friuli; Referee: Tullio Lanese

19 January 1986 18	Roma	2–1	Bari	Rome
14:30 CEST (UTC+01:00)	Pruzzo 21', 90' (pen.)	Report	Piraccini 12'	Stadium: Stadio Olimpico; Referee: Salvatore Lombardo

26 January 1986 19	Roma	2–0	Napoli	Rome
14:30 CEST (UTC+01:00)	Gerolin 42'; Boniek 61'	Report		Stadium: Stadio Olimpico; Referee: Pierluigi Magni

9 February 1986 20	Torino	0–1	Roma	Turin
15:00 CEST (UTC+01:00)		Report	Pruzzo 35'	Stadium: Stadio Comunale; Referee: Claudio Pieri

16 February 1986 21	Roma	5–1	Avellino	Rome
15:00 CEST (UTC+01:00)	Pruzzo 15' (pen.), 58', 70', 88', 90' (pen.)	Report	Díaz 27'	Stadium: Stadio Olimpico; Referee: Tullio Lanese

23 February 1986 22	Fiorentina	1–1	Roma	Florence
15:00 CEST (UTC+01:00)	Boniek 57' (o.g.)	Report	Pruzzo 22'	Stadium: Stadio Comunale; Referee: Maurizio Mattei

2 March 1986 23	Roma	3–1	Internazionale	Rome
15:00 CEST (UTC+01:00)	Graziani 23', 33'; Gerolin 84'	Report	Rummenigge 61'	Stadium: Stadio Olimpico; Referee: Giancarlo Redini

9 March 1986 24	Verona	3–2	Roma	Verona
15:00 CEST (UTC+01:00)	Di Gennaro 24'; Galderisi 51' (pen.); Briegel 89'	Report	Pruzzo 21', 29'	Stadium: Stadio Marc'Antonio Bentegodi; Referee: Pietro D'Elia

16 March 1986 25	Roma	3–0	Juventus	Rome
15:00 CEST (UTC+01:00)	Graziani 3'; Pruzzo 28'; Cerezo 83'	Report		Stadium: Stadio Olimpico; Referee: Luigi Agnolin

23 March 1986 26	Milan	0–1	Roma	Milan
15:00 CEST (UTC+01:00)		Report	Pruzzo 69'	Stadium: San Siro; Referee: Claudio Pieri

6 April 1986 27	Roma	1–0	Sampdoria	Rome
15:30 CEST (UTC+02:00)	Graziani 74'	Report		Stadium: Stadio Olimpico; Referee: Pierluigi Magni

13 April 1986 28	Pisa	2–4	Roma	Pisa
15:30 CEST (UTC+02:00)	Kieft 32'; Volpecina 42'	Report	Volpecina 24' (o.g.); Caneo 55' (o.g.); Bonetti 57'; Pruzzo 80'	Stadium: Stadio Arena Garibaldi; Referee: Luigi Agnolin

20 April 1986 29	Roma	2–3	Lecce	Rome
15:30 CEST (UTC+02:00)	Graziani 7'; Pruzzo 82'	Report	Di Chiara 32'; Barbas 42' (pen.), 53'	Stadium: Stadio Olimpico; Referee: Rosario Lo Bello

27 April 1986 30	Como	1–0	Roma	Como
15:30 CEST (UTC+02:00)	Corneliusson 1'	Report		Stadium: Stadio Giuseppe Sinigaglia; Referee: Tullio Lanese

=== Coppa Italia ===
==== Group stage ====
Group 8
Pos	Team	Pld	W	D	L	GF	GA	GD	Pts
1	Roma(1)	5	3	1	1	10	2	+8	7
2	Messina(2)	5	2	3	0	4	2	+2	7
3	Ascoli(2)	5	2	2	1	5	6	−1	6
4	Campobasso(2)	5	1	2	2	2	3	−1	4
5	Bari(1)	5	1	2	2	3	6	−3	4
6	Catanzaro(2)	5	0	2	3	3	8	−5	2

==== Results ====
21 August 1985 1	Messina	1–0	Roma	Messina
20:30 CEST (UTC+02:00)	Orati 32'			Stadium: Stadio Giovanni Celeste; Referee: Pierluigi Magni

25 August 1985 2	Roma	4–1	Catanzaro	Rome
20:30 CEST (UTC+02:00)	Pruzzo 22'; Masi 53' (o.g.); Boniek 64'; Tovalieri 73'		Soda 77'	Stadium: Stadio Olimpico; Referee: Salvatore Lombardo

28 August 1985 3	Roma	3–0	Ascoli	Rome
20:45 CEST (UTC+02:00)	Tovalieri 5', 53', 68'			Stadium: Stadio Olimpico; Referee: Pietro D'Elia

1 September 1985 4	Campobasso	0–0	Roma	Campobasso
20:30 CEST (UTC+02:00)				Stadium: Stadio Nuovo Romagnoli; Referee: Pierluigi Pairetto

4 September 1985 5	Bari	0–3	Roma	Bari
20:30 CEST (UTC+02:00)			Cerezo 13'; Giannini 17'; Tovalieri 40'	Stadium: Stadio della Vittoria; Referee: Paolo Casarin

==== Round of 16 ====
29 January 1986 First leg	Roma	2–0	Atalanta	Rome
14:30 CEST (UTC+01:00)	Desideri 29'; Di Carlo 53'			Stadium: Stadio Olimpico; Referee: Roberto Bianciardi

12 February 1986 Second leg	Atalanta	2–1 (2–3 agg.)	Roma	Bergamo
20:00 CEST (UTC+01:00)	Piovanelli 60'; Bonetti 79' (o.g.)		Graziani 21'	Stadium: Stadio Comunale; Referee: Giancarlo Redini

==== Quarter-finals ====
7 May 1986 First leg	Roma	2–0	Internazionale	Rome
17:30 CEST (UTC+02:00)	Desideri 15' (pen.); Tovalieri 29'			Stadium: Stadio Olimpico; Referee: Luigi Agnolin

19 May 1986 Second leg	Internazionale	2–1 (2–3 agg.)	Roma	Milan
20:30 CEST (UTC+02:00)	Brady 16' (pen.); Mandelli 75'		Giannini 44'	Stadium: San Siro; Referee: Rosario Lo Bello

==== Semi-final ====
28 May 1986 First leg	Roma	2–0	Fiorentina	Rome
20:30 CEST (UTC+02:00)	Righetti 15'; Tovalieri 18'			Stadium: Stadio Olimpico; Referee: Claudio Pieri

4 June 1986 Second leg	Fiorentina	1–1 (1–3 agg.)	Roma	Florence
20:30 CEST (UTC+02:00)	Monelli 50'		Giannini 45'	Stadium: Stadio Comunale; Referee: Tullio Lanese

==== Final ====
7 June 1986 First leg	Sampdoria	2–1	Roma	Genoa
21:00 CEST (UTC+02:00)	R. Mancini 19'; Galia 67'		Tovalieri 45'	Stadium: Stadio Luigi Ferraris; Referee: Paolo Casarin

14 June 1986 Second leg	Roma	2–0 (3–2 agg.)	Sampdoria	Rome
21:00 CEST (UTC+02:00)	Desideri 43' (pen.); Graziani (red card) 78'; Cerezo 89'			Stadium: Stadio Olimpico; Referee: Tullio Lanese

== Statistics ==
=== Players statistics ===
No.	Pos	Nat	Player	Total		Serie A		Coppa	
No.	Pos	Nat	Player	Apps	Goals	Apps	Goals	Apps	Goals
	GK	(Italy) ITA	Franco Tancredi	37	-30	30	-27	7	-3
	DF	(Italy) ITA	Emidio Oddi	40	0	27	0	13	0
	DF	(Italy) ITA	Dario Bonetti	25	2	22	2	3	0
	DF	(Italy) ITA	Sebastiano Nela	35	2	28	2	7	0
	DF	(Italy) ITA	Ubaldo Righetti	35	1	23	0	12	1
	MF	(Italy) ITA	Manuel Gerolin	36	2	24+3	2	9	0
	MF	(Brazil) BRA	Toninho Cerezo	24	6	18	4	6	2
	MF	(Italy) ITA	Carlo Ancelotti	33	0	25+4	0	4	0
	MF	(Italy) ITA	Bruno Conti	31	2	23+1	2	7	0
	FW	(Poland) POL	Zbigniew Boniek	34	8	29	7	5	1
	FW	(Italy) ITA	Roberto Pruzzo	33	20	23+1	19	9	1
	GK	(Italy) ITA	Attilio Gregori	7	-6	0	-0	7	-6
	FW	(Italy) ITA	Sandro Tovalieri	33	11	14+8	3	11	8
	MF	(Italy) ITA	Giuseppe Giannini	35	5	14+8	2	13	3
	MF	(Italy) ITA	Antonio Di Carlo	31	1	12+7	0	12	1
	FW	(Italy) ITA	Francesco Graziani	24	6	9+5	5	10	1
	MF	(Italy) ITA	Stefano Desideri	16	3	5+2	0	9	3
	DF	(Italy) ITA	Settimio Lucci	19	0	4+5	0	10	0
	MF	(Italy) ITA	Stefano Impallomeni	6	0	0	0	6	0
	DF	(Italy) ITA	Mastrantonio	3	0	0	0	3	0
	MF	(Italy) ITA	V. Bencivenga	2	0	0	0	2	0
	FW	(Italy) ITA	A. Gespi	1	0	0	0	1	0
	DF	(Italy) ITA	F. Petiti	1	0	0	0	1	0
	DF	(Italy) ITA	Marra	0	0	0	0	0	0
	FW	(Italy) ITA	P. Santinelli						
	FW	(Italy) ITA	G. Belardinelli						
	FW	(Italy) ITA	P. Petitti						
	FW	(Italy) ITA	S. Papa						

- Source: http://calcio-seriea.net/allenatori_squadra/1985/903/
- (Italy) Roberto Pruzzo 19 (4)
- (Poland) Zbigniew Boniek 7 (1)
- (Italy) Francesco Graziani 5
- (Brazil) Toninho Cerezo 4
- (Italy) Sandro Tovalieri 3
