= 1982–83 AS Roma season =

Roma
1982–83 season
- Chairman: Dino Viola
- Manager: Nils Liedholm
- Stadium: Stadio Olimpico
- Serie A: Winners (in European Cup)
- Coppa Italia: Quarterfinals
- UEFA Cup: Quarterfinals
- Top goalscorer: League: Pruzzo (12); All: Pruzzo (22)
- Average home league attendance: 54,510
Home colours	Away colours

During the season, AS Roma competed in Serie A, Coppa Italia and UEFA Cup.

== Squad ==
Note: Flags indicate national team as defined under FIFA eligibility rules; some limited exceptions apply. Players may hold more than one non-FIFA nationality.

Pos.	Nation	Player
GK	ITA	Franco Superchi
GK	ITA	Franco Tancredi
DF	ITA	Agostino Di Bartolomei (captain)
DF	ITA	Massimo Gregori
DF	ITA	Settimio Lucci
DF	ITA	Sebastiano Nela
DF	ITA	Michele Nappi
DF	ITA	Aldo Maldera
DF	ITA	Ubaldo Righetti
DF	ITA	Maurizio Turone
DF	ITA	Pietro Vierchowod
DF	ITA	Viero Vignoli
MF	ITA	Carlo Ancelotti
MF	ITA	Gianni Boccia

Pos.	Nation	Player
MF	ITA	Odoacre Chierico
MF	ITA	Bruno Conti
MF	BRA	Paulo Roberto Falcão
MF	ITA	Giuseppe Giannini
MF	ITA	Paolo Giovannelli
MF	AUT	Herbert Prohaska
MF	ITA	Roberto Scarnecchia
MF	ITA	Claudio Valigi
FW	ITA	Paolo Baldieri
FW	ITA	Paolo Alberto Faccini
FW	ITA	Maurizio Iorio
FW	ITA	Roberto Pruzzo
FW	ITA	Sandro Tovalieri

== Competitions ==
=== Serie A ===
==== League table ====
Pos	Team	Pld	W	D	L	GF	GA	GD	Pts	Qualification or relegation
1	Roma (C)	30	16	11	3	47	24	+23	43	Qualification to European Cup
2	Juventus	30	15	9	6	49	26	+23	39	Qualification to Cup Winners' Cup
3	Internazionale	30	12	14	4	40	23	+17	38	Qualification to UEFA Cup
4	Hellas Verona	30	11	13	6	37	31	+6	35	Qualification to UEFA Cup
5	Fiorentina	30	12	10	8	36	25	+11	34	

Source: Panini
Rules for classification: 1) points; 2) Head-to-head points; 3) goal difference; 4) number of goals scored.
(C) Champions

==== Results by round ====
Round	1	2	3	4	5	6	7	8	9	10	11	12	13	14	15	16	17	18	19	20	21	22	23	24	25	26	27	28	29	30
Ground	A	H	A	H	A	H	A	H	A	H	A	H	A	H	A	H	A	H	A	H	A	A	A	H	A	H	A	H	A	H
Result	W	W	L	W	W	W	L	W	D	W	D	W	D	W	D	W	D	W	D	W	D	L	W	D	D	W	D	W	D	W
Position	3	2	6	2	1	1	2	1	1	1	1	1	1	1	1	1	1	1	1	1	1	1	1	1	1	1	1	1	1	1

Source: Competitive matches
A = Away; H = Home; W = Win; D = Draw; L = Loss; P = Postponed; = Leader, 1983–84 European Cup; = Qualification to the 1983–84 UEFA Cup; = Relegation to 1983-84 Serie B; R = 1983-84 UEFA Cup Winners' Cup

==== Matches ====
12 September 1982 1	Cagliari	1–3	Roma	Cagliari
16:00	Piras 67'	Report	9' Faccini; 61' (o.g.) Loi; 87' Iorio	Stadium: Stadio Sant'Elia; Referee: Lo Bello

19 September 1982 2	Roma	1–0	Hellas Verona	Rome
16:00	Di Bartolomei 90' (pen.)	Report		Stadium: Stadio Olimpico; Referee: Pieri

26 September 1982 3	Sampdoria	1–0	Roma	Genoa
15:00	Mancini 35'	Report		Stadium: Stadio Luigi Ferraris; Referee: Barbaresco

3 October 1982 4	Roma	2–1	Ascoli	Rome
15:00	Prohaska 13'; Pruzzo 81' (pen.)	Report	74' Greco	Stadium: Stadio Olimpico; Attendance: 50,000; Referee: Bergamo

10 October 1982 5	Napoli	1–3	Roma	Naples
15:00	Pellegrini 2'	Report	33' Iorio; 65' Nela; 78' Chierico	Stadium: Stadio San Paolo; Attendance: 64,298; Referee: Casarin

17 October 1982 6	Roma	1–0	Cesena	Rome
14:30	Pruzzo 10'	Report		Stadium: Stadio Olimpico; Attendance: 28,793; Referee: Lo Bello

24 October 1982 7	Juventus	2–1	Roma	Turin
14:30	Platini 49'; Scirea 55'	Report	5' Chierico	Stadium: Stadio Comunale; Attendance: 50,000; Referee: D'Elia

31 October 1982 8	Roma	3–1	Pisa	Rome
14:30	Pruzzo 75' (pen.), 81'; Maldera 86'	Report	25' Todesco	Stadium: Stadio Olimpico; Attendance: 31,585; Referee: Barbaresco

7 November 1982 9	Udinese	1–1	Roma	Udine
14:30	Šurjak 80'	Report	22' Falcão	Stadium: Stadio Friuli; Attendance: 45,000; Referee: Mattei

21 November 1982 10	Roma	3–1	Fiorentina	Rome
14:30	Pruzzo 4'; Conti 45', 85'	Report	30' (pen.) Antognoni	Stadium: Stadio Olimpico; Attendance: 70,000; Referee: Agnolin

28 November 1982 11	Catanzaro	0–0	Roma	Catanzaro
14:30		Report		Stadium: Stadio Militare; Referee: D'Elia

12 December 1982 12	Roma	2–1	Inter	Rome
14:30	Falcão 34'; Iorio 67'	Report	89' Altobelli	Stadium: Stadio Olimpico; Referee: Bergamo

19 December 1982 13	Avellino	1–1	Roma	Avellino
14:30	Barbadillo 50'	Report	31' Prohaska	Stadium: Stadio Partenio; Referee: Mattei

2 January 1983 14	Roma	2–0	Genoa	Rome
14:30	Corti 2' (o.g.); Di Bartolomei 48'	Report		Stadium: Stadio Olimpico; Attendance: 60,000; Referee: Casarin

9 January 1983 15	Torino	1–1	Roma	Turin
14:30	Dossena 46'	Report	32' Pruzzo	Stadium: Stadio Comunale; Referee: Lo Bello

16 January 1983 16	Roma	1–0	Cagliari	Rome
14:30	Falcão 48'	Report		Stadium: Stadio Olimpico; Referee: Pieri

23 January 1983 17	Hellas Verona	1–1	Roma	Verona
14:30	Penzo 28'	Report	26' Iorio	Stadium: Stadio Marcantonio Bentegodi; Referee: Bergamo

30 January 1983 18	Roma	1–0	Sampdoria	Rome
14:30	Iorio 35'	Report		Stadium: Stadio Olimpico; Attendance: 60,000; Referee: Redini

6 February 1983 19	Ascoli	1–1	Roma	Ascoli Piceno
15:00	Giuseppe Greco 13'	Report	20' Ancelotti	Stadium: Stadio Cino e Lillo Del Duca; Attendance: 26,000; Referee: Menicucci

20 February 1983 20	Roma	5–2	Napoli	Rome
15:00	Nela 31'; Ancelotti 43'; Di Bartolomei 48', 62'; Pruzzo 71'	Report	13' Díaz; 76' Marino	Stadium: Stadio Olimpico; Attendance: 65,000; Referee: Agnolin

27 February 1983 21	Cesena	1–1	Roma	Cesena
15:00	Arrigoni 74'	Report	71' Pruzzo	Stadium: Stadio Dino Manuzzi; Attendance: 20,000; Referee: Bergamo

6 March 1983 22	Roma	1–2	Juventus	Rome
15:00	Falcão 62'	Report	83' Platini; 86' Brio	Stadium: Stadio Olimpico; Referee: Barbaresco

13 March 1983 23	Pisa	1–2	Roma	Pisa
15:00	Berggreen 65'	Report	13' Falcão; 61' Di Bartolomei	Stadium: Stadio Arena Garibaldi; Referee: Lo Bello

20 March 1983 24	Roma	0–0	Udinese	Rome
15:00		Report		Stadium: Stadio Olimpico; Referee: Redini

27 March 1983 25	Fiorentina	2–2	Roma	Florence
15:30	Massaro 9'; Ancelotti 84' (o.g.)	Report	18' Pruzzo; 62' (pen.) Prohaska	Stadium: Stadio Comunale; Referee: Agnolin

10 April 1983 26	Roma	2–0	Catanzaro	Rome
15:30	Di Bartolomei 38'; Pruzzo 62'	Report		Stadium: Stadio Olimpico; Referee: Paparesta

24 April 1983 27	Inter	0–0	Roma	Milan
15:30		Report		Stadium: Stadio Giuseppe Meazza; Referee: Bergamo

1 May 1983 28	Roma	2–0	Avellino	Rome
16:00	Falcão 38'; Di Bartolomei 65'	Report		Stadium: Stadio Olimpico; Referee: Vitali

8 May 1983 29	Genoa	1–1	Roma	Genoa
16:00	Fiorini 42'	Report	19' Pruzzo	Stadium: Stadio Luigi Ferraris; Referee: D'Elia

15 May 1983 30	Roma	3–1	Torino	Rome
16:00	Pruzzo 21' (pen.); Falcão 36'; Conti 85'	Report	81' Hernández	Stadium: Stadio Olimpico; Referee: Bianciardi

=== Coppa Italia ===
==== First round ====
18 August 1982 1	SPAL	0–1	Roma	Ferrara
20:30		Report	29' Iorio	Stadium: Stadio Paolo Mazza; Referee: Pairetto

22 August 1982 2	Roma	5–1	Modena	Rome
20:30	Di Bartolomei 52'; Chierico 56'; Pruzzo 67', 73', 83'	Report	4' Messina	Stadium: Stadio Olimpico; Referee: Angelelli

29 August 1982 3	Lecce	0–0	Roma	Lecce
17:00		Report		Stadium: Stadio Via del Mare; Referee: Pieri

1 September 1982 4	Hellas Verona	0–5	Roma	Verona
21:00			43', 63', 83' Pruzzo; 45' Iorio; 87' Prohaska	Stadium: Stadio Marcantonio Bentegodi; Referee: D'Elia

5 September 1982 5	Roma	2–0	Como	Rome
20:30	Nela 10'; Pruzzo 79'	Report		Stadium: Stadio Flaminio; Referee: Patrussi

==== Round of 16 ====
31 March 1983 First leg	Avellino	0–1	Roma	Avellino
15:30		Report	53' Prohaska	Stadium: Stadio Partenio; Attendance: 8,981; Referee: Angelelli

14 April 1983 Second leg	Roma	5–3 (6–3 agg.)	Avellino	Rome
20:45	Iorio 5'; Faccini 8'; Chierico 16'; Falcão 39'; Baldieri 70'	Report	28', 54' Skov; 42' (o.g.) Valigi	Stadium: Stadio Olimpico; Referee: Lombardo

==== Quarter-finals ====
1 June 1983 First leg	Juventus	3–0	Roma	Turin
20:30	Cabrini 42'; Platini 70'; Boniek 88'	Report		Stadium: Stadio Comunale; Referee: D'Elia

4 June 1983 Second leg	Roma	0–2 (0–5 agg.)	Juventus	Rome
18:30		Report	49' Tardelli; 53' Boniek	Stadium: Stadio Olimpico; Referee: Lo Bello

=== UEFA Cup ===
==== First round ====
15 September 1982 First leg	Roma (Italy)	3–0	(England) Ipswich Town	Rome
20:30 CET	Osman 10' (o.g.); Pruzzo 35', 68'	Report		Stadium: Stadio Olimpico; Attendance: 60,334; Referee: (Turkey) Talat Tokat

29 September 1982 Second leg	Ipswich Town (England)	3–1 (3–4 agg.)	(Italy) Roma	Ipswich
20:30 CET	Gates 41'; McCall 54'; Butcher 71'	Report	64' Maldera	Stadium: Portman Road; Referee: (Czech Republic) Vojtech Christov

==== Second round ====
20 October 1982 First leg	Roma (Italy)	1–0	(Sweden) IFK Norrköping	Rome
20:30 CET	Pruzzo 52' (pen.)	Report		Stadium: Stadio Olimpico; Referee: (Socialist Federal Republic of Yugoslavia) Zoran Petrović

3 November 1982 Second leg	IFK Norrköping (Sweden)	1–0 (a.e.t.) (1–1 agg.) (2–4 p)	(Italy) Roma	Norrköping
19:00 CET	Bergman 60'	Report		Referee: (Scotland) David Syme
	Penalties
	Lundqvist (penalty missed); Pettersson (penalty scored); Bergman (penalty scored); Svensson (penalty missed)		(penalty scored) Di Bartolomei; (penalty scored) Conti; (penalty scored) Chierico; (penalty scored) Righetti

==== Third round ====
24 November 1982 First leg	Köln (West Germany)	1–0	(Italy) Roma	Köln
20:00 CET	Allofs 40'	Report		Stadium: Müngersdorfer Stadion; Referee: (France) Michel Vautrot

8 December 1982 Second leg	Roma (Italy)	2–0 (2–1 agg.)	(West Germany) Köln	Rome
14:30 CET	Iorio 58'; Falcão 88'	Report		Stadium: Stadio Olimpico; Attendance: 70,000; Referee: (Belgium) Roger Schoeters

==== Quarter-finals ====
2 March 1983 First leg	Roma (Italy)	1–2	(Portugal) Benfica	Rome
15:00 CET	Di Bartolomei 67' (pen.)	Report	40', 62' Filipovic	Stadium: Stadio Olimpico; Referee: (Austria) Horst Brummeier

16 March 1983 Second leg	Benfica (Portugal)	1–1 (3–2 agg.)	(Italy) Roma	Lisbon
22:00 CET	Filipovic 20'	Report	85' Falcão	Stadium: Estádio da Luz; Referee: (Hungary) Karoly Palotai

== Statistics ==
=== Players statistics ===
No.	Pos	Nat	Player	Total		Serie A		Coppa		1982–83 UEFA Cup	
No.	Pos	Nat	Player	Apps	Goals	Apps	Goals	Apps	Goals	Apps	Goals
	GK	(Italy) ITA	Franco Tancredi	47	-40	30	-23	9	-9	8	-8
	DF	(Italy) ITA	Sebastiano Nela	44	3	28	2	8	1	8	0
	DF	(Italy) ITA	Pietro Vierchowod	43	0	30	0	5	0	8	0
	DF	(Italy) ITA	Agostino Di Bartolomei	44	9	28	7	9	1	7	1
	DF	(Italy) ITA	Aldo Maldera	41	2	26	1	7	0	8	1
	MF	(Austria) AUT	Herbert Prohaska	42	5	26	3	8	2	8	0
	MF	(Italy) ITA	Carlo Ancelotti	31	2	22+1	2	2	0	6	0
	MF	(Brazil) BRA	Paulo Roberto Falcão	39	10	27	7	4	1	8	2
	MF	(Italy) ITA	Bruno Conti	40	3	26	3	7	0	7	0
	FW	(Italy) ITA	Roberto Pruzzo	39	22	27	12	5	7	7	3
	FW	(Italy) ITA	Maurizio Iorio	40	9	22+3	5	9	3	6	1
	GK	(Italy) ITA	Franco Superchi	1	-1	0+1	-1	0	0	0	0
	DF	(Italy) ITA	Ubaldo Righetti	21	0	12	0	7	0	2	0
	MF	(Italy) ITA	Claudio Valigi	26	0	11+2	0	9	0	4	0
	DF	(Italy) ITA	Michele Nappi	23	0	10+6	0	4	0	3	0
	MF	(Italy) ITA	Odoacre Chierico	27	4	8+8	2	7	2	4	0
	FW	(Italy) ITA	Paolo Alberto Faccini	11	2	1+2	1	7	1	1	0
	MF	(Italy) ITA	Paolo Giovannelli	1	0	0+1	0	0	0		
	MF	(Italy) ITA	Roberto Scarnecchia	3	0	0	0	3	0		
	MF	(Italy) ITA	Giuseppe Giannini	2	0	0	0	2	0		
	FW	(Italy) ITA	Paolo Baldieri	1	1	0	0	1	1		
	DF	(Italy) ITA	Settimio Lucci	1	0	0	0	1	0		
	DF	(Italy) ITA	Maurizio Turone	1	0	0	0	1	0		
	DF	(Italy) ITA	Viero Vignoli	0	0	0	0	0	0		
	MF	(Italy) ITA	Gianni Boccia	0	0	0	0	0	0		
	FW	(Italy) ITA	Sandro Tovalieri	0	0	0	0	0	0		
	DF	(Italy) ITA	Massimo Gregori								

- Source: http://calcio-seriea.net/presenze/1982/869/
