= 1986–87 AS Roma season =

Roma
1986–87 season
- Manager: Sven-Göran Eriksson (until 3 May 1987); Angelo Sormani (since 4 May 1987)
- Serie A: 7th
- Coppa Italia: Round of 32
- Cup Winners' Cup: Round of 16
- Top goalscorer: League: Klaus Berggreen, Stefano Desideri (5); All: Klaus Berggreen, Stefano Desideri (5)
Home colours	Away colours

AS Roma dropped off the pace of the top teams during the 1986–87 season, which ended Sven-Göran Eriksson's first Italian employment prematurely. From being the top scoring team in the season before, Roma struggled with finding the back of the net, resulting in worsened results.

== Squad ==
=== Goalkeepers ===
- (Italy) Attilio Gregori
- (Italy) Franco Tancredi

=== Defenders ===
- (Italy) Marco Baroni
- (Italy) Manuel Gerolin
- (Italy) Settimio Lucci
- (Italy) Paolo Mastrantonio
- (Italy) Sebastiano Nela
- (Italy) Emidio Oddi
- (Italy) Ubaldo Righetti

=== Midfielders ===
- (Italy) Carlo Ancelotti
- (Denmark) Klaus Berggreen
- (Poland) Zbigniew Boniek
- (Italy) Bruno Conti
- (Italy) Stefano Desideri
- (Italy) Antonio Di Carlo
- (Italy) Giuseppe Giannini
- (Italy) Stefano Impallomeni

=== Attackers ===
- (Italy) Roberto Pruzzo
- (Italy) Massimo Agostini
- (Italy) Paolo Baldieri

== Competitions ==
=== Serie A ===
==== League table ====
Pos	Team	Pld	W	D	L	GF	GA	GD	Pts	Qualification or relegation
5	Milan (Note: Milan won the UEFA Cup qualification match against Sampdoria 1–0 then qualified to 1987–88 UEFA Cup.)	30	13	9	8	31	21	+10	35	Qualification to UEFA Cup
6	Sampdoria	30	13	9	8	37	21	+16	35	
7	Roma	30	12	9	9	37	31	+6	33	
8	Avellino	30	9	12	9	31	38	−7	30	
9	Como	30	5	16	9	16	20	−4	26	

Source: 1986–87 Serie A, RSSSF.com
Rules for classification: 1) Points; 2) Head-to-head points; 3) Head-to-head goal difference; 4) Goal difference; 5) Goals scored; 6) Draw. (Note: Head-to-head record is used only after all the matches between the teams in question have been played).

==== Matches ====
14 September 1986 1	Roma	0–0	Como	Rome
16:00 CEST (UTC+02:00)		Report		Stadium: Stadio Olimpico; Referee: Arcangelo Pezzella

21 September 1986 2	Atalanta	0–1	Roma	Bergamo
16:00 CEST (UTC+02:00)		Report	Ancelotti 44'	Stadium: Stadio Comunale; Referee: Tullio Lanese

28 September 1986 3	Roma	0–0	Verona	Rome
15:00 CEST (UTC+01:00)	Pruzzo (penalty missed) 75'	Report		Stadium: Stadio Olimpico; Referee: Pierluigi Pairetto

5 October 1986 4	Internazionale	4–1	Roma	Milan
15:00 CEST (UTC+01:00)	Garlini 5'; Altobelli 58', 67', 77', (penalty missed) 66'	Report	Pruzzo 69'	Stadium: Stadio Giuseppe Meazza; Referee: Claudio Pieri

12 October 1986 5	Roma	2–1	Brescia	Rome
15:00 CEST (UTC+01:00)	Ancelotti (red card) 44'; Giannini 49' (pen.); Baroni 69'	Report	Baroni 53' (o.g.)	Stadium: Stadio Olimpico; Referee: Romeo Paparesta

19 October 1986 6	Torino	0–2	Roma	Turin
14:30 CEST (UTC+01:00)		Report	Berggreen 75'; Agostini 84'	Stadium: Stadio Comunale; Referee: Luigi Agnolin

26 October 1986 7	Roma	0–1	Napoli	Rome
14:30 CEST (UTC+01:00)	Pruzzo (red card) 86'	Report	Maradona 46'	Stadium: Stadio Olimpico; Referee: Giancarlo Redini

2 November 1986 8	Empoli	1–3	Roma	Empoli
14:30 CEST (UTC+01:00)	Della Monica 24'	Report	Baldieri 55', 59'; Desideri 90'	Stadium: Stadio Carlo Castellani; Referee: Pierluigi Pairetto

9 November 1986 9	Roma	4–0	Udinese	Rome
14:30 CEST (UTC+01:00)	Berggreen 24'; Ancelotti 28'; Desideri 66'; Giannini 80'	Report		Stadium: Stadio Olimpico; Referee: Rosario Lo Bello

23 November 1986 10	Fiorentina	2–1	Roma	Florence
14:30 CEST (UTC+01:00)	Díaz 21'; Berti 68'	Report	Pruzzo 26'	Stadium: Stadio Comunale; Referee: Paolo Casarin

30 November 1986 11	Roma	3–0	Juventus	Rome
14:30 CEST (UTC+01:00)	Berggreen 39'; Desideri 41'; Giannini 75'	Report	Serena (penalty missed) 52'	Stadium: Stadio Olimpico; Referee: Claudio Pieri

14 December 1986 12	Ascoli	1–1	Roma	Ascoli Piceno
14:30 CEST (UTC+01:00)	Vincenzi 75'	Report	Nela 76'	Stadium: Stadio Cino e Lillo Del Duca; Referee: Tullio Lanese

21 December 1986 13	Roma	1–2	Milan	Rome
14:30 CEST (UTC+01:00)	Desideri 45' (pen.)	Report	Virdis 29' (pen.), 54'	Stadium: Stadio Olimpico; Referee: Luigi Agnolin

4 January 1987 14	Sampdoria	0–0	Roma	Genoa
14:30 CEST (UTC+01:00)		Report		Stadium: Stadio Luigi Ferraris; Referee: Paolo Casarin

11 January 1987 15	Roma	3–0	Avellino	Rome
14:30 CEST (UTC+01:00)	Boniek 36'; Pruzzo 49'; Agostini 52'	Report		Stadium: Stadio Olimpico; Referee: Claudio Pieri

18 January 1987 16	Como	0–0	Roma	Como
14:30 CEST (UTC+01:00)		Report		Stadium: Stadio Giuseppe Sinigaglia; Referee: Giancarlo Redini

1 February 1987 17	Roma	4–2	Atalanta	Rome
14:30 CEST (UTC+01:00)	Berggreen 14'; Di Carlo 55'; Pruzzo 69'; Agostini 88'	Report	Boniek 28' (o.g.); Strömberg 37'	Stadium: Stadio Olimpico; Referee: Fabio Baldas

8 February 1987 18	Verona	0–1	Roma	Verona
14:30 CEST (UTC+01:00)		Report	Nela 15'	Stadium: Stadio Marc'Antonio Bentegodi; Referee: Paolo Casarin

22 February 1987 19	Roma	1–0	Internazionale	Rome
15:00 CEST (UTC+01:00)	Berggreen 30'	Report		Stadium: Stadio Olimpico; Referee: Tullio Lanese

1 March 1987 20	Brescia	1–1	Roma	Brescia
15:00 CEST (UTC+01:00)	Gritti 66'	Report	Boniek 61'	Stadium: Stadio Mario Rigamonti; Referee: Rosario Lo Bello

8 March 1987 21	Roma	1–0	Torino	Rome
15:00 CEST (UTC+01:00)	Agostini 54'; Boniek (red card) 54'	Report	Lerda (red card) 83'	Stadium: Stadio Olimpico; Referee: Giancarlo Redini

15 March 1987 22	Napoli	0–0	Roma	Naples
15:00 CEST (UTC+01:00)		Report		Stadium: Stadio San Paolo; Referee: Pierluigi Magni

22 March 1987 23	Roma	2–1	Empoli	Rome
15:00 CEST (UTC+01:00)	Baroni 47'; Baldieri 59'	Report	Salvadori 51'	Stadium: Stadio Olimpico; Referee: Tullio Lanese

29 March 1987 24	Udinese	2–1	Roma	Udine
15:30 CEST (UTC+02:00)	Graziani 50'; Storgato 84'	Report	Nela 10'	Stadium: Stadio Friuli; Referee: Romeo Paparesta

5 April 1987 25	Roma	1–1	Fiorentina	Rome
15:30 CEST (UTC+02:00)	Boniek 76' (pen.)	Report	Díaz 7'	Stadium: Stadio Olimpico; Referee: Claudio Pieri

12 April 1987 26	Juventus	2–0	Roma	Turin
15:30 CEST (UTC+02:00)	Serena 6'; Briaschi 57'	Report		Stadium: Stadio Comunale; Referee: Paolo Casarin

26 April 1987 27	Roma	1–1	Ascoli	Rome
15:30 CEST (UTC+02:00)	Desideri 49' (pen.)	Report	Iachini 40'	Stadium: Stadio Olimpico; Referee: Romeo Paparesta

3 May 1987 28	Milan	4–1	Roma	Milan
16:00 CEST (UTC+02:00)	Virdis 26', 52', 54'; Donadoni 69'	Report	Boniek 10'	Stadium: Stadio San Siro; Referee: Tullio Lanese

10 May 1987 29	Roma	0–3	Sampdoria	Rome
16:00 CEST (UTC+02:00)		Report	Vierchowod 22'; Vialli 44', 51'	Stadium: Stadio Olimpico; Referee: Pierluigi Magni

17 May 1987 30	Avellino	2–1	Roma	Avellino
16:00 CEST (UTC+02:00)	Tovalieri 79'; Murelli 82'	Report	Conti 3'	Stadium: Stadio Partenio; Referee: Fabio Baldas

=== Topscorers ===
- (Denmark) Klaus Berggreen 5
- (Italy) Stefano Desideri 5 (2)
- (Italy) Massimo Agostini 4
- (Poland) Zbigniew Boniek 4 (1)
- (Italy) Roberto Pruzzo 4
- (Italy) Francesco Baldieri 3
- (Italy) Giuseppe Giannini 3 (1)
- (Italy) Sebastiano Nela 3

=== Coppa Italia ===
First round: Group 8
Pos	Team	Pld	W	D	L	GF	GA	GD	Pts
1	Hellas Verona	5	4	1	0	8	2	+6	9
2	Roma	5	3	1	1	8	3	+5	7
3	Piacenza	5	1	3	1	6	7	−1	5
4	Bari	5	1	2	2	3	4	−1	4
5	Campobasso	5	0	3	2	0	5	−5	3
6	Perugia	5	0	2	3	2	6	−4	2

==== Results ====
24 August 1986 1	Roma	3–0	Campobasso	Rome
20:30 CEST (UTC+02:00)	Conti 11'; Baroni 43'; Boniek 80' (pen.)	Report		Stadium: Stadio Olimpico; Attendance: 40,000; Referee: Arcangelo Pezzella

27 August 1986 2	Piacenza	2–4	Roma	Piacenza
20:45 CEST (UTC+02:00)	Madonna 51', 75' (pen.)		Agostini 18'; Boniek 33' (pen.), 43'; Oddi 76'	Stadium: Stadio Galleana; Referee: Pierluigi Magni

31 August 1986 3	Roma	1–0	Perugia	Rome
20:30 CEST (UTC+02:00)	Boniek 8' (pen.)	Report		Stadium: Stadio Olimpico; Attendance: 40,000; Referee: Luciano Luci

3 September 1986 4	Bari	0–0	Roma	Bari
20:20 CEST (UTC+02:00)		Report		Stadium: Stadio Comunale; Referee: Pierluigi Pairetto

7 September 1986 5	Verona	1–0	Roma	Verona
20:30 CEST (UTC+02:00)	Volpati 39'	Report		Stadium: Stadio Marc'Antonio Bentegodi; Referee: Romeo Paparesta

==== Round of 16 ====
25 February 1987 First leg	Roma	2–2	Bologna	Rome
15:00 CEST (UTC+01:00)	Di Carlo 2'; Giannini 66'	Report	Stringara 29'; Marronaro 32'	Stadium: Stadio Olimpico; Attendance: 12,024; Referee: Massimo Leni

8 April 1987 Second leg	Bologna	1–1 (3a–3 agg.)	Roma	Bologna
20:45 CEST (UTC+02:00)	Pradella 75'	Report	Pruzzo (red card) 52'; Giannini 88'	Stadium: Stadio Comunale; Attendance: 20,000; Referee: Pierluigi Pairetto

=== UEFA Cup Winners' Cup ===
==== First round ====
17 September 1986 First leg	Roma (Italy)	2–0	(Spain) Real Zaragoza	Rome, Italy
20:30 CEST (UTC+02:00)	Di Carlo 23'; Gerolin 55'	Report		Stadium: Stadio Olimpico; Referee: Siegfried Kirschen (German Democratic Republic)

1 October 1986 Second leg	Real Zaragoza (Spain)	2–0 (4–3 p)	(Italy) Roma	Zaragoza, Spain
21:00 CEST (UTC+01:00)	Señor 44', 47'	Report		Stadium: La Romareda; Referee: George Courtney (England)
	Penalties
	Cortés (penalty missed); Mejías (penalty scored); Yáñez (penalty scored); Ayneto (penalty scored); Señor (penalty scored)		(penalty scored) Desideri; (penalty scored) Giannini; (penalty scored) Baroni; (penalty missed) Boniek; (penalty missed) Ancelotti

=== Friendly tournaments ===
Los Angeles Gold Cup (post-season)

15 June 1987 Match 1	América (Mexico)	1–2	(Italy) Roma	Los Angeles, United States
	Camacho 35'	Report	Boniek 41', 43'	Stadium: Los Angeles Memorial Coliseum

17 June 1987 Match 2	Roma (Italy)	0–0	(Brazil) Vasco da Gama	Los Angeles, United States
		Report		Stadium: Los Angeles Memorial Coliseum

20 June 1987 Semifinals	Rosario Central (Argentina)	1–1 (6–5 p)	(Italy) Roma	Los Angeles, United States
		Report		Stadium: Los Angeles Memorial Coliseum

21 June 1987 Third place match	Guadalajara (Mexico)	4–2	(Italy) Roma	Los Angeles, United States
	Guerrero 3'; Díaz 13'; Rodríguez 16'; Moreno 73'	Report	Madero 22' (o.g.); Boniek 59' (pen.)	Stadium: Los Angeles Memorial Coliseum
