= List of AS Roma seasons =

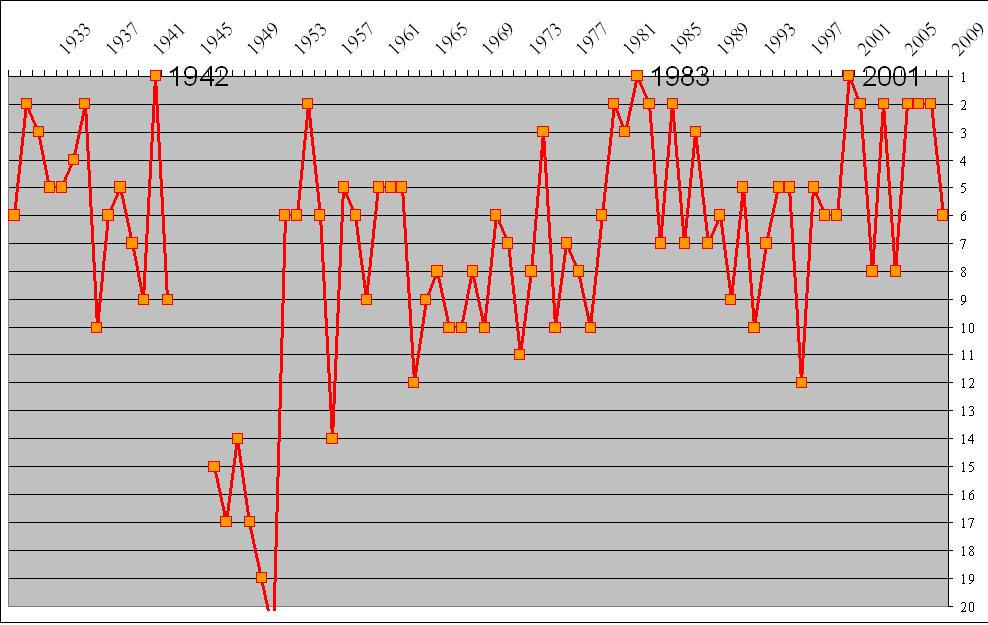
Historical AS Roma positions in Serie A

This is a list of seasons played by AS Roma in Italian and European football, from 1978 to the present day. It details the club's achievements in major competitions, and the top scorers for each season.

== Key ==
- EC = European Cup (1955–1992)
- UCL = UEFA Champions League (1992–)
- ICFC = Inter-Cities Fairs Cup (1955–1971) (Note: This was a non-UEFA competition but generally considered to be the predecessor to the UEFA Cup when it was abolished in 1971)
- UC = UEFA Cup (1971–2009)
- UEL = UEFA Europa League (2009–)
- UECL = UEFA Europa Conference League (2021–)
- CWC = UEFA Cup Winners' Cup (1960–1999)

Winner	Runners-up	Third place

== Seasons ==
As of 24 May 2026

Season	League									CI (Note: After competitions in 1922 and 1926–27 (unfinished), the competition began to be held annually from 1935. The competition did not run from 1942 due to World War II and did not resume until 1958.)	SCI (Note: Tournament began in 1988.)	UCL (Note: European Cup (1955–1992) or UEFA Champions League (1992–current))	UEL (Note: UEFA Cup (1971–2009) or UEFA Europa League (1971–current))	Other (Note: Includes UEFA Cup Winners' Cup, Inter Cities Fairs Cup and UEFA Europa Conference League)	Top scorer(s) (Note: Goals in all competitions (Serie A, Serie B or Serie C, Coppa Italia, European tournaments and Supercoppa Italiana) are counted, except when the number is in italics)	
Season	Division	Pld	W	D	L	GF	GA	Pts	Pos	CI	SCI	UCL	UEL	Other	Player(s)	Goals
1943–44	1943–44 Roman War Championship	18	13	5	0	62	17	31	2nd							
1945–46	Serie A–B (Note: The competition consisted of two groups (Northern and Central/Southern) with qualification to a national final round. Roma qualified for the final round and the statistics are reflected of both results.)	34	14	10	10	57	78	44	6th							
1946–47	Serie A	38	12	9	17	41	56	33	15th							
1947–48	Serie A	40	13	9	18	54	69	35	17th							
1948–49	Serie A	38	12	8	18	47	57	32	14th							
1949–50	Serie A	38	12	7	19	52	70	31	18th							
1950–51	Serie A	38	10	8	20	48	54	28	19th ↓							
1951–52	Serie B	38	22	9	7	62	24	53	1st ↑							
1952–53	Serie A	34	13	10	11	50	44	36	6th							
1953–54	Serie A	34	12	12	10	53	42	36	6th							
1954–55	Serie A	34	13	15	6	53	39	41	3rd							
1955–56	Serie A	34	11	13	10	43	40	35	6th							
1956–57	Serie A	34	10	11	13	53	49	31	14th							
1957–58	Serie A	34	12	12	10	46	42	36	5th	GS						
1958–59	Serie A	34	12	11	11	57	41	35	6th	4R				QF^{ICFC}		
1959–60	Serie A	34	13	8	13	53	53	34	9th	2R				QF^{ICFC}		
1960–61	Serie A	34	16	7	11	58	46	39	5th	QF				W^{ICFC}		
1961–62	Serie A	34	18	8	8	61	35	44	5th	QF				2R^{ICFC}		
1962–63	Serie A	34	13	14	7	57	32	40	5th	R16				SF^{ICFC}		
1963–64	Serie A	34	9	11	14	43	44	29	12th	W				QF^{ICFC}		
1964–65	Serie A	34	8	15	11	29	35	31	9th	SF				3R^{ICFC}		
1965–66	Serie A	34	13	10	11	28	31	36	8th	1R				1R^{ICFC}		
1966–67	Serie A	34	11	11	12	35	39	33	10th	1R						
1967–68	Serie A	30	7	13	10	25	35	27	10th	1R						
1968–69	Serie A	30	10	10	10	35	35	30	8th	W						
1969–70	Serie A	30	8	12	10	27	36	28	11th	QF				SF^{CWC}		
1970–71	Serie A	30	7	18	5	32	25	32	6th	QF						
1971–72	Serie A	30	13	9	8	37	31	35	7th	GS						
1972–73	Serie A	30	6	12	12	23	28	24	11th	GS						
1973–74	Serie A	30	10	9	11	29	28	29	8th	GS						
1974–75	Serie A	30	15	9	6	25	15	39	3rd	2R					Pierino Prati	22
1975–76	Serie A	30	6	13	11	25	31	25	10th	GS			3R		Stefano Pellegrini Carlo Petrini	8
1976–77	Serie A	30	9	10	11	27	33	28	8th	GS					Agostino Di Bartolomei	9
1977–78	Serie A	30	8	12	10	31	24	38	8th	GS					Agostino Di Bartolomei	13
1978–79	Serie A	30	8	10	20	24	32	26	12th	GS					Roberto Pruzzo	12
1979–80	Serie A	30	10	12	8	34	35	32	7th	W					Roberto Pruzzo	18
1980–81	Serie A	30	14	14	2	43	20	42	2nd	W				R32^{CWC}	Roberto Pruzzo	19
1981–82	Serie A	30	15	8	7	40	29	38	3rd	QF				R16^{CWC}	Roberto Pruzzo	16
1982–83	Serie A	30	16	11	3	47	24	43	1st	QF			QF		Roberto Pruzzo	22
1983–84	Serie A	30	15	11	4	48	28	41	2nd	W		RU			Roberto Pruzzo	15
1984–85	Serie A	30	10	14	6	33	25	34	7th	R16				QF^{CWC}	Roberto Pruzzo	10
1985–86	Serie A	30	19	3	8	51	27	41	2nd	W					Roberto Pruzzo	20
1986–87	Serie A	30	12	9	9	37	31	33	7th	R16				R32^{CWC}	Zbigniew Boniek	8
1987–88	Serie A	30	15	8	7	39	26	38	3rd	R16					Giuseppe Giannini	12
1988–89	Serie A	34	11	12	11	33	40	34	7th	2GS			R16		Rudi Völler	15
1989–90	Serie A	34	14	13	7	45	40	41	6th	SF					Rudi Völler	16
1990–91	Serie A	34	11	14	9	43	37	36	9th	W			RU		Rudi Völler	25
1991–92	Serie A	34	13	14	7	35	30	35	5th	QF	RU			QF^{CWC}	Ruggiero Rizzitelli	12
1992–93	Serie A	34	8	17	9	42	39	33	10th	RU			QF		Giuseppe Giannini	16
1993–94	Serie A	34	10	15	9	35	30	35	7th	R16					Abel Balbo	13
1994–95	Serie A	34	16	11	7	46	25	59	5th	QF					Abel Balbo	21
1995–96	Serie A	34	16	10	8	51	34	58	5th	R32			QF		Abel Balbo	14
1996–97	Serie A	34	10	11	13	46	47	41	12th	R32			R32		Abel Balbo	14
1997–98	Serie A	34	16	11	7	67	42	59	4th	QF					Abel Balbo	14
1998–99	Serie A	34	15	9	10	69	49	54	6th	R16			QF		Marco Delvecchio	18
1999–2000	Serie A	34	14	12	8	57	34	54	6th	QF			R16		Vincenzo Montella	21
2000–01	Serie A	34	22	9	3	68	33	75	1st	R16			R16		Gabriel Batistuta	21
2001–02	Serie A	34	19	13	2	58	24	70	2nd	QF	W	2GS			Vincenzo Montella	15
2002–03	Serie A	34	13	10	11	55	46	49	8th	RU		2GS			Francesco Totti	20
2003–04	Serie A	34	21	8	5	68	19	71	2nd	QF			R16		Francesco Totti	20
2004–05	Serie A	38	11	12	15	55	58	45	8th	RU		GS			Vincenzo Montella	23
2005–06	Serie A	38	19	12	7	70	42	69	2nd	RU			R16		Mancini	18
2006–07	Serie A	38	22	9	7	74	34	75	2nd	W	RU	QF			Francesco Totti	32
2007–08	Serie A	38	24	10	4	72	37	82	2nd	W	W	QF			Francesco Totti	18
2008–09	Serie A	38	18	9	11	64	61	63	6th	QF	RU	R16			Mirko Vučinić	17
2009–10	Serie A	38	24	8	6	68	41	80	2nd	RU			R16		Francesco Totti	25
2010–11	Serie A	38	18	9	11	59	52	63	6th	SF	RU	R16			Marco Borriello Francesco Totti	17
2011–12	Serie A	38	16	8	14	60	54	56	7th	QF			PO		Dani Osvaldo	11
2012–13	Serie A	38	18	8	12	71	56	62	6th	RU					Dani Osvaldo	17
2013–14	Serie A	38	26	7	5	72	25	85	2nd	SF					Mattia Destro	13
2014–15	Serie A	38	19	13	6	54	31	70	2nd	QF		GS	R16		Francesco Totti	10
2015–16	Serie A	38	23	11	4	83	41	80	3rd	R16		R16			Mohamed Salah	15
2016–17	Serie A	38	28	3	7	90	38	87	2nd	SF		PO	R16		Edin Džeko	29
2017–18	Serie A	38	23	8	7	61	28	77	3rd	R16		SF			Edin Džeko	24
2018–19	Serie A	38	18	12	8	66	48	66	6th	QF		R16			Edin Džeko	14
2019–20	Serie A	38	21	7	10	77	51	70	5th	QF			R16		Edin Džeko	19
2020–21	Serie A	38	18	8	12	68	58	62	7th	R16			SF		Borja Mayoral	17
2021–22	Serie A	38	18	9	11	59	43	63	6th	QF				W^{UECL}	Tammy Abraham	27
2022–23	Serie A	38	18	9	11	50	38	63	6th	QF			RU		Paulo Dybala	18
2023–24	Serie A	38	18	9	11	65	46	63	6th	QF			SF		Romelu Lukaku	21
2024–25	Serie A	38	20	9	9	56	35	69	5th	QF			R16		Artem Dovbyk	17
2025–26	Serie A	38	23	4	11	59	31	73	3rd	R16			R16		Donyell Malen	15
