= 1984–85 AS Roma season =

Roma
1984–85 season
- President: Dino Viola
- Manager: Sven-Göran Eriksson
- Stadium: Stadio Olimpico
- Serie A: 7th
- Coppa Italia: Round of 16
- European Cup Winners' Cup: Quarter-finals
- Top goalscorer: League: Roberto Pruzzo (8); All: Roberto Pruzzo (8)
Home colours	Away colours

Associazione Sportiva Roma did not manage to repeat its successful previous two seasons, and instead took a step back to seventh in the league championship. New coach Sven-Göran Eriksson was soon to get to grips with Italian football, with Roma improving the next year to be a force for the title.

== Squad ==
=== Goalkeepers ===
- (Italy) Franco Tancredi
- (Italy) Astutillo Malgioglio

=== Defenders ===
- (Italy) Dario Bonetti
- (Italy) Settimio Lucci
- (Italy) Aldo Maldera
- (Italy) Sebastiano Nela
- (Italy) Emidio Oddi
- (Italy) Ubaldo Righetti

=== Midfielders ===
- (Italy) Carlo Ancelotti
- (Italy) Ruben Buriani
- (Brazil) Toninho Cerezo
- (Italy) Odoacre Chierico
- (Italy) Bruno Conti
- (Italy) Antonio Di Carlo
- (Brazil) Falcão
- (Italy) Giuseppe Giannini

=== Attackers ===
- (Italy) Roberto Pruzzo
- (Italy) Francesco Graziani
- (Italy) Roberto Antonelli
- (Italy) Maurizio Iorio

== Competitions ==
=== Serie A ===
==== League table ====
Pos	Team	Pld	W	D	L	GF	GA	GD	Pts	Qualification or relegation
5	Milan	30	12	12	6	31	25	+6	36 (Note: Position defined by head-to-head points: Milan: 3 pts; Juventus: 1 pt.)	Qualification to UEFA Cup
6	Juventus (Note: Juventus gained entry to the 1985–86 European Cup as defending champions.)	30	11	14	5	48	33	+15	36	Qualification to European Cup
7	Roma	30	10	14	6	33	25	+8	34	
8	Napoli	30	10	13	7	34	29	+5	33	
9	Fiorentina	30	8	13	9	33	31	+2	29	

Source: RSSSF.com
Rules for classification: 1) Points; 2) Head-to-head points; 3) Head-to-head goal difference; 4) Goal difference; 5) Goals scored; 6) Draw. (Note: Head-to-head record is used only after all the matches between the teams in question have been played).

==== Matches ====
16 September 1984 1	Avellino	0–0	Roma	Avellino
16:00 CEST (UTC+02:00)		Report		Stadium: Stadio Partenio; Referee: Pierluigi Pairetto

23 September 1984 2	Roma	1–1	Como	Rome
16:00 CEST (UTC+02:00)	Cerezo 59'	Report	Corneliusson 77'	Stadium: Stadio Olimpico; Referee: Egidio Ballerini

30 September 1984 3	Atalanta	0–0	Roma	Bergamo
15:00 CEST (UTC+01:00)		Report		Stadium: Stadio Comunale; Referee: Giancarlo Redini

7 October 1984 4	Roma	1–1	Sampdoria	Rome
15:00 CEST (UTC+01:00)	Pruzzo 14' (pen.)	Report	Souness 16' (pen.)	Stadium: Stadio Olimpico; Referee: Roberto Bianciardi

14 October 1984 5	Milan	2–1	Roma	Milan
14:30 CEST (UTC+01:00)	Di Bartolomei 58'; Hateley 64'	Report	Cerezo 70'; Conti (red card) 90'; Oddi (red card) 90'	Stadium: San Siro; Referee: Pietro D'Elia

21 October 1984 6	Roma	0–0	Verona	Rome
14:30 CEST (UTC+01:00)		Report		Stadium: Stadio Olimpico; Referee: Maurizio Mattei

28 October 1984 7	Juventus	1–1	Roma	Turin
14:30 CEST (UTC+01:00)	Briaschi 19'	Report	Giannini 30'	Stadium: Stadio Comunale; Referee: Paolo Casarin

11 November 1984 8	Roma	0–0	Lazio	Rome
14:30 CEST (UTC+01:00)		Report		Stadium: Stadio Olimpico; Attendance: 68,895; Referee: Paolo Bergamo

18 November 1984 9	Roma	2–1	Fiorentina	Rome
14:30 CEST (UTC+01:00)	Iorio 28' (pen.); Giannini 45'	Report	Sócrates 85' (pen.)	Stadium: Stadio Olimpico; Referee: Pierluigi Pairetto

25 November 1984 10	Ascoli	0–0	Roma	Ascoli Piceno
14:30 CEST (UTC+01:00)		Report		Stadium: Stadio Cino e Lillo Del Duca; Referee: Egidio Ballerini

2 December 1984 11	Roma	2–1	Udinese	Rome
14:30 CEST (UTC+01:00)	Pruzzo 16'; Graziani 82'	Report	Selvaggi 69'	Stadium: Stadio Olimpico; Referee: Romeo Paparesta

16 December 1984 12	Napoli	1–2	Roma	Naples
14:30 CEST (UTC+01:00)	Bertoni 45'	Report	Falcão 20'; Marino 78' (o.g.)	Stadium: Stadio San Paolo; Referee: Paolo Bergamo

23 December 1984 13	Roma	3–2	Cremonese	Rome
14:30 CEST (UTC+01:00)	Giannini 9'; Ancelotti 50'; Pruzzo 78'	Report	Finardi 56' (pen.), 75'	Stadium: Stadio Olimpico; Referee: Pierluigi Magni

6 January 1985 14	Internazionale	0–0	Roma	Milan
14:30 CEST (UTC+01:00)		Report		Stadium: San Siro; Referee: Rosario Lo Bello

13 January 1985 15	Roma	1–0	Torino	Rome
14:30 CEST (UTC+01:00)	Pruzzo 38'	Report		Stadium: Stadio Olimpico; Referee: Paolo Bergamo

20 January 1985 16	Roma	1–0	Avellino	Rome
14:30 CEST (UTC+01:00)	Pruzzo 61' (pen.)	Report	Colomba (penalty missed) 87'	Stadium: Stadio Olimpico; Referee: Romeo Paparesta

27 January 1985 17	Como	0–0	Roma	Como
14:30 CEST (UTC+01:00)		Report		Stadium: Stadio Giuseppe Sinigaglia; Referee: Giancarlo Redini

10 February 1985 18	Roma	1–1	Atalanta	Rome
15:00 CEST (UTC+01:00)	Cerezo 86'	Report	Pacione 27'	Stadium: Stadio Olimpico; Referee: Pierluigi Pairetto

17 February 1985 19	Sampdoria	3–0	Roma	Genoa
15:00 CEST (UTC+01:00)	Vialli 45'; Galia 58'; Righetti 67' (o.g.)	Report		Stadium: Stadio Luigi Ferraris; Referee: Pietro D'Elia

24 February 1985 20	Roma	0–1	Milan	Rome
15:00 CEST (UTC+01:00)		Report	Virdis 12'	Stadium: Stadio Olimpico; Referee: Egidio Ballerini

3 March 1985 21	Verona	1–0	Roma	Verona
15:00 CEST (UTC+01:00)	Elkjær 75'	Report	Conti (red card) 90'	Stadium: Stadio Marc'Antonio Bentegodi; Referee: Paolo Casarin

17 March 1985 22	Roma	1–1	Juventus	Rome
15:00 CEST (UTC+01:00)	Nela 67'	Report	Boniek 54'	Stadium: Stadio Olimpico; Referee: Luigi Agnolin

24 March 1985 23	Lazio	1–1	Roma	Rome
15:30 CEST (UTC+01:00)	Garlini (red card) 63'; Giordano 73'	Report	Chierico (red card) 63'; Antonelli 71'	Stadium: Stadio Olimpico; Attendance: 50,000; Referee: Pietro D'Elia

31 March 1985 24	Fiorentina	1–0	Roma	Florence
15:30 CEST (UTC+02:00)	Passarella 62'	Report		Stadium: Stadio Artemio Franchi; Referee: Giancarlo Redini

14 April 1985 25	Roma	3–1	Ascoli	Rome
15:30 CEST (UTC+02:00)	Graziani 1'; Dell'Oglio 19'; Righetti 48'	Report	Dirceu 50'	Stadium: Stadio Olimpico; Referee: Pierluigi Pairetto

21 April 1985 26	Udinese	0–2	Roma	Udine
15:30 CEST (UTC+02:00)		Report	Pruzzo 67'; Chierico 90'	Stadium: Stadio Friuli; Referee: Paolo Casarin

28 April 1985 27	Roma	1–1	Napoli	Rome
15:30 CEST (UTC+02:00)	Dal Fiume 42' (o.g.)	Report	Bertoni 40'	Stadium: Stadio Olimpico; Referee: Luigi Agnolin

5 May 1985 28	Cremonese	0–5	Roma	Cremona
16:00 CEST (UTC+02:00)		Report	Di Carlo 18', 42', 86'; Pruzzo 38' (pen.); Ancelotti 87'	Stadium: Stadio Giovanni Zini; Referee: Claudio Pieri

12 May 1985 29	Roma	4–3	Internazionale	Rome
16:00 CEST (UTC+02:00)	Ancelotti 25'; Conti 38'; Giannini 49'; Pruzzo 51'	Report	Oddi 29' (o.g.); Rummenigge 59'; Altobelli 65'	Stadium: Stadio Olimpico; Referee: Massimo Leni

19 May 1985 30	Torino	1–0	Roma	Turin
16:00 CEST (UTC+02:00)	Serena 79'	Report		Stadium: Stadio Comunale; Referee: Carlo Sguizzato

=== Coppa Italia ===
==== Group stage ====
Group 3
Pos	Team	Pld	W	D	L	GF	GA	GD	Pts
1	Roma	5	3	2	0	8	2	+6	8
2	Genoa	5	2	2	1	7	4	+3	6
3	Lazio	5	2	2	1	8	6	+2	6
4	Varese	5	0	5	0	2	2	0	5
5	Padova	5	1	2	2	3	5	−2	4
6	Pistoiese	5	0	1	4	1	10	−9	1

==== Results ====
22 August 1984 1	Pistoiese	0–1	Roma	Pistoia
20:45 CEST (UTC+02:00)			Nela 76'	Stadium: Stadio Comunale; Referee: Egidio Ballerini

26 August 1984 2	Roma	2–2	Padova	Rome
20:30 CEST (UTC+02:00)	Cerezo 4'; Giannini 6'		Pradella 38'; Sorbello 84'	Stadium: Stadio Olimpico; Referee: Salvatore Lombardo

29 August 1984 3	Varese	0–0	Roma	Varese
20:45 CEST (UTC+02:00)				Stadium: Stadio Franco Ossola; Referee: Maurizio Mattei

2 September 1984 4	Roma	3–0	Genoa	Rome
20:30 CEST (UTC+02:00)	Graziani 27', 83'; Pruzzo 80'			Stadium: Stadio Olimpico; Referee: Giancarlo Redini

9 September 1984 5	Roma	2–0	Lazio	Rome
16:30 CEST (UTC+02:00)	Iorio 66' (pen.); Di Carlo 75'			Stadium: Stadio Olimpico; Referee: Pietro D'Elia

==== Round of 16 ====
13 February 1985 First leg	Parma	0–0	Roma	Parma
20:30 CEST (UTC+01:00)				Stadium: Stadio Ennio Tardini; Referee: Massimo Leni

27 February 1985 Second leg	Roma	1–1 (1–1a agg.)	Parma	Rome
15:00 CEST (UTC+01:00)	Iorio 28'		Marocchi 70'	Stadium: Stadio Olimpico; Referee: Maurizio Mattei

=== European Cup Winners' Cup ===
==== First round ====
19 September 1984 First leg	Roma (Italy)	1–0	(Romania) Steaua București	Rome, Italy
20:45 CEST (UTC+02:00)	Graziani 73'	Report		Stadium: Stadio Olimpico; Attendance: 50,000; Referee: Robert Wurtz (France)

3 October 1984 Second leg	Steaua București (Romania)	0–0 (0–1 agg.)	(Italy) Roma	Bucharest, Romania
13:30 CEST (UTC+01:00)		Report		Stadium: Ghencea Stadium; Attendance: 30,000; Referee: Bruno Galler (Switzerland)

==== Second round ====
24 October 1984 First leg	Roma (Italy)	2–0	(Wales) Wrexham	Rome, Italy
14:30 CEST (UTC+01:00)	Pruzzo 37' (pen.); Cerezo 50'	Report		Stadium: Stadio Olimpico; Attendance: 36,792; Referee: László Pádár (Hungary)

7 November 1984 Second leg	Wrexham (Wales)	0–1 (0–3 agg.)	(Italy) Roma	Wrexham, Wales
20:30 CEST (UTC+01:00)		Report	Graziani 67'	Stadium: Racecourse Ground; Attendance: 14,007; Referee: Ángel Franco Martínez (Spain)

==== Quarter-finals ====
6 March 1985 First leg	Bayern Munich (Germany)	2–0	(Italy) Roma	Munich, Germany
20:00 CEST (UTC+01:00)	Augenthaler 44'; Hoeneß 77'	Report		Stadium: Olympiastadion; Attendance: 60,000; Referee: George Courtney (England)

20 March 1985 Second leg	Roma (Italy)	1–2 (1–4 agg.)	(Germany) Bayern Munich	Rome, Italy
	Nela 79'	Report	Matthäus 32' (pen.); Kögl 80'	Stadium: Stadio Olimpico; Attendance: 55,000; Referee: Vojtech Christov (Czechoslovakia)

== Statistics ==
=== Goalscorers ===
- (Italy) Roberto Pruzzo 8 (3)
- (Italy) Giuseppe Giannini 4
- (Italy) Antonio Di Carlo 3
- (Italy) Carlo Ancelotti 3
