= Mastrantonio =

Mastrantonio is a name concentrated mainly in Italy, which may be its originating country too. Notable people with the surname include:

- Ella Mastrantonio (born 1992), Australian footballer
- Mary Elizabeth Mastrantonio (born 1958), American actress and singer
- Paolo Mastrantonio (born 1967), Italian soccer player or not.
