= Claudio Valigi =

Italian association football manager (born 1962)

Personal information
- Date of birth: 3 February 1962 (age 64)
- Place of birth: Deruta, Italy
- Height: 1.78 m (5 ft 10 in)
- Position: Midfielder

Senior career*
Years	Team	Apps	(Gls)
1979–1982	Ternana	60	(1)
1982–1983	Roma	13	(0)
1983–1984	Perugia	35	(1)
1984–1988	Padova	135	(17)
1988–1989	Messina	6	(0)
1989–1991	Mantova	21	(0)
1991–1993	Benevento		
1993–1994	Deruta		

International career
1982–1983	Italy U-21	6	(1)

Managerial career
- 2010–2011: Sambonifacese
- 2011–2012: Mantova
- 2012: Lupa Frascati
- * Club domestic league appearances and goals

Claudio Valigi (born 3 February 1962 in Deruta) is an Italian association football manager, who last served as head coach of Lupa Frascati and former player.

== Career ==
=== Player ===
After spending the first three seasons of his career with Ternana Calcio in the second and then third tier of Italian football, before the 1982/83 season he received several offers from the Serie A teams, including A.C. Milan. He chose A.S. Roma. In that season he collected 13 appearances as the backup to Falcão, Herbert Prohaska and Carlo Ancelotti. He was called Falcão's heir due to certain similarities in playing style. However, after winning the championship that season, he was sold to Perugia Calcio and never played on the top level in Italy again, not fulfilling the lofty expectations.

=== Coach ===
In the season 2010-11 he was the manager of Sambonifacese in the Lega Pro Seconda Divisione.

On 4 October 2011 he became the new coach of Mantova in the Lega Pro Seconda Divisione, in place of the sacked Archimede Graziani. On 28 February 2012 he was sacked.

In summer 2012 he was named new coach of Lupa Frascati just promoted in Serie D, but on 17 December 2012 he was sacked.

== Honours ==
- Serie A champion: 1982/83 with Roma.
