= 1980–81 Coppa Italia =

Tournament details
- Country: Italy
- Dates: 20 Aug 1980 – 17 June 1981
- Teams: 36

Final positions
- Champions: Roma (4th title)
- Runners-up: Torino

Tournament statistics
- Matches played: 84
- Goals scored: 178 (2.12 per match)
- Top goal scorer: Francesco Graziani (5 goals)

The 1980–81 Coppa Italia, the 34th Coppa Italia was an Italian Football Federation domestic cup competition won by Roma.

== Group stage ==
=== Group 1 ===
Pos	Team	Pld	W	D	L	GF	GA	GD	Pts
1	Juventus	4	3	1	0	8	3	+5	7
2	Udinese	4	1	3	0	5	3	+2	5
3	Genoa	4	0	3	1	2	4	−2	3
4	Taranto	4	1	1	2	2	4	−2	2 (Note: 1 point deducted?)
5	Brescia	4	0	2	2	2	5	−3	2

=== Group 2 ===
Pos	Team	Pld	W	D	L	GF	GA	GD	Pts
1	Avellino	4	2	2	0	7	3	+4	6
2	Palermo	4	3	0	1	6	4	+2	6
3	Internazionale	4	1	2	1	3	3	0	4
4	Milan	4	1	1	2	2	3	−1	3
5	Catania	4	0	1	3	3	8	−5	1

=== Group 3 ===
Pos	Team	Pld	W	D	L	GF	GA	GD	Pts
1	SPAL	4	3	1	0	9	3	+6	7
2	Cagliari	4	2	1	1	7	6	+1	5
3	Foggia	4	1	2	1	6	8	−2	4
4	Monza	4	1	0	3	5	7	−2	2
5	Como	4	0	2	2	1	4	−3	2

=== Group 4 ===
Pos	Team	Pld	W	D	L	GF	GA	GD	Pts
1	Fiorentina	4	2	2	0	6	2	+4	6
2	Atalanta	4	2	2	0	4	1	+3	6
3	Pistoiese	4	1	1	2	1	3	−2	3
4	Cesena	4	1	1	2	5	8	−3	3
5	Rimini	4	0	2	2	2	4	−2	2

=== Group 5 ===
Pos	Team	Pld	W	D	L	GF	GA	GD	Pts
1	Bologna	4	3	1	0	7	2	+5	7
2	Napoli	4	3	1	0	6	3	+3	7
3	Vicenza	4	2	0	2	4	6	−2	4
4	Sampdoria	4	1	0	3	2	3	−1	2
5	Pisa	4	0	0	4	1	6	−5	0

=== Group 6 ===
Pos	Team	Pld	W	D	L	GF	GA	GD	Pts
1	Lazio	4	3	1	0	7	1	+6	7
2	Ascoli	4	2	1	1	4	2	+2	5
3	Pescara	4	2	0	2	3	5	−2	4
4	Varese	4	1	1	2	3	3	0	3
5	Hellas Verona	4	0	1	3	0	6	−6	1

=== Group 7 ===
Pos	Team	Pld	W	D	L	GF	GA	GD	Pts
1	Torino	4	3	1	0	10	3	+7	7
2	Perugia	4	1	2	1	3	3	0	4
3	Catanzaro	4	2	0	2	3	5	−2	4
4	Bari	4	1	1	2	3	3	0	3
5	Lecce	4	0	2	2	1	6	−5	2

== Quarter-finals ==
Join the defending champion: Roma.

Team 1	Agg.	Team 2	1st leg	2nd leg
Avellino	3-6	Juventus	1-3	2-3
Lazio	0-4	Bologna	0-2	0-2
Fiorentina	0-1	Roma	0-1	0-0
SPAL	1-4	Torino	1-0	0-4

== Semi-finals ==
Team 1	Agg.	Team 2	1st leg	2nd leg
Bologna	4-5	Torino	2-2	2-3 (aet)
Juventus	1-2	Roma	0-1	1-1

== Final ==
=== First leg ===
13 June 1981
20:30

Roma	1–1	Torino
Ancelotti 31'		Santarini 59' (o.g.)

Stadio Olimpico, Rome
Referee: Claudio Pieri

=== Second leg ===
17 June 1981
20:30

Torino	1–1 (a.e.t.)	Roma
Cuttone 37'		Di Bartolomei 23' (pen.)
Penalties
Pecci (penalty missed); Sclosa (penalty scored); Bertoneri (penalty scored); Graziani (penalty missed)	2–4	(penalty scored) Ancelotti; (penalty scored) Conti; (penalty scored) Santarini; (penalty missed) Di Bartolomei; (penalty scored) Falcao

Stadio Comunale di Torino, Turin
Referee: Alberto Michelotti

== Top goalscorers ==
Rank	Player	Club	Goals
1	(Italy) Francesco Graziani	Torino	5
2	(Italy) Vincenzo D'Amico	Torino	4
2	(Italy) Salvatore Garritano	Bologna	4
3	(Italy) Adelmo Paris	Bologna	3
3	(Italy) Pietro Fanna	Juventus	3
3	(Italy) Antonio Cabrini	Juventus	3
3	(Italy) Giuliano Musiello	Foggia	3
3	(Italy) Egidio Calloni	Palermo	3
3	(Italy) Beniamino Vignola	Avellino	3
3	(Italy) Pierluigi Giani	SPAL	3
3	(Italy) Ugo Tosetto	Vicenza	3
3	(Italy) Luigi Piras	Cagliari	3
3	(Italy) Gabriele Messina	Atalanta	3
