= Maurizio Iorio =

Italian footballer

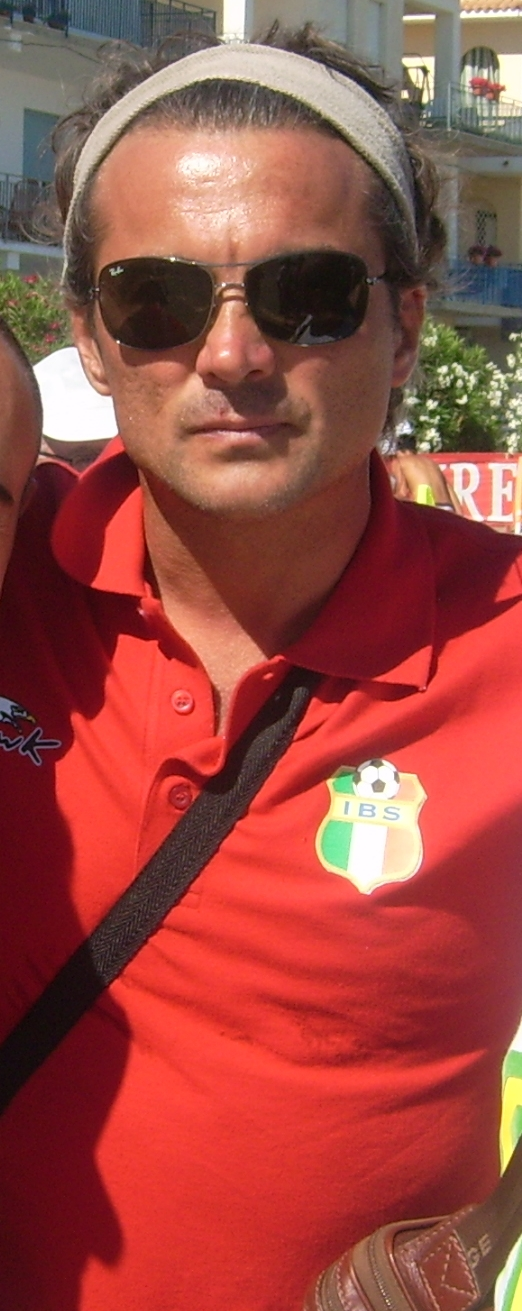
- Iorio before a beach soccer match in July 2007

Personal information
- Date of birth: 6 June 1959 (age 67)
- Place of birth: Milan, Italy
- Height: 1.73 m (5 ft 8 in)
- Position: Striker

Senior career*
Years	Team	Apps	(Gls)
1975–1976	Vigevano	6	(2)
1976–1978	Foggia	21	(7)
1978–1979	Torino	15	(3)
1979–1980	Ascoli	11	(1)
1980–1982	Bari	65	(28)
1982–1985	Roma	41	(6)
1983–1984	→ Verona (loan)	25	(14)
1985–1986	Fiorentina	25	(1)
1986–1988	Brescia	39	(9)
1988–1989	Piacenza	20	(5)
1989–1990	Verona	24	(3)
1990–1991	Internazionale	5	(0)
1992–1993	Genoa	23	(1)
Total		320	(80)
- * Club domestic league appearances and goals

Maurizio Iorio (born 6 June 1959 in Milan) is an Italian former professional footballer who played as a striker. He played for several Italian clubs throughout his career, and during the 1982–83 season, he won the Serie A title with Roma, forming a formidable offensive partnership with the more offensive-minded Roberto Pruzzo. At international level, he represented the Italy national football team at the 1984 Summer Olympics.

== Style of play ==
Considered to be a highly talented player in his youth, Iorio was a diminutive forward, who was highly regarded for his speed, creativity, dribbling skills, and technical ability, which enabled him to get past more physically imposing players. However, he was also known to be inconsistent, due to his poor work-rate and undisciplined lifestyle off the pitch. He often played as a deep-lying forward behind a main centre-forward, due to his ability to provide assists, although he was also known for his eye for goal, and had a tendency to score decisive goals for his teams.

== Honours ==
Roma

- Serie A: 1982–83

Inter

- UEFA Cup: 1990–91
