= 1982–83 Coppa Italia =

Tournament details
- Country: Italy
- Dates: 18 Aug 1982 – 22 June 1983
- Teams: 48

Final positions
- Champions: Juventus (7th title)
- Runners-up: Hellas Verona

Tournament statistics
- Matches played: 150
- Goals scored: 351 (2.34 per match)
- Top goal scorer: Giuseppe Greco (9 goals)

The 1982–83 Coppa Italia, the 36th Coppa Italia was an Italian Football Federation domestic cup competition won by Juventus.

== Group stage ==
=== Group 1 ===
Pos	Team	Pld	W	D	L	GF	GA	GD	Pts
1	Torino	5	3	2	0	7	4	+3	8
2	Cagliari	5	2	3	0	8	5	+3	7
3	Palermo	5	1	4	0	5	4	+1	6
4	Monza	5	1	1	3	7	7	0	3
5	Reggina	5	1	1	3	6	8	−2	3
6	Benevento	5	0	3	2	3	8	−5	3

=== Group 2 ===
Pos	Team	Pld	W	D	L	GF	GA	GD	Pts
1	Ascoli	5	4	0	1	12	8	+4	8
2	Varese	5	2	3	0	7	4	+3	7
3	Pistoiese	5	3	1	1	7	5	+2	7
4	Sampdoria	5	1	2	2	6	5	+1	4
5	Triestina	5	0	2	3	5	9	−4	2
6	Brescia	5	1	0	4	3	9	−6	2

=== Group 3 ===
Pos	Team	Pld	W	D	L	GF	GA	GD	Pts
1	Napoli	5	4	1	0	6	2	+4	9
2	Avellino	5	2	2	1	6	5	+1	6
3	Lazio	5	2	1	2	8	8	0	5
4	Perugia	5	0	4	1	3	4	−1	4
5	Atalanta	5	0	4	1	1	2	−1	4
6	Salernitana	5	0	2	3	4	7	−3	2

=== Group 4 ===
Pos	Team	Pld	W	D	L	GF	GA	GD	Pts
1	Bologna	5	2	3	0	8	3	+5	7
2	Pisa	5	3	1	1	7	2	+5	7
3	Fiorentina	5	2	2	1	8	3	+5	6
4	Campobasso	5	3	0	2	3	5	−2	6
5	Cavese	5	0	2	3	0	3	−3	2
6	Nocerina	5	1	0	4	1	11	−10	2

=== Group 5 ===
Pos	Team	Pld	W	D	L	GF	GA	GD	Pts
1	Roma	5	4	1	0	13	1	+12	9
2	Hellas Verona	5	3	1	1	5	6	−1	7
3	Lecce	5	2	2	1	4	3	+1	6
4	SPAL	5	2	0	3	3	5	−2	4
5	Como	5	0	2	3	2	6	−4	2
6	Modena	5	0	2	3	2	8	−6	2

=== Group 6 ===
Pos	Team	Pld	W	D	L	GF	GA	GD	Pts
1	Juventus	5	3	2	0	10	7	+3	8
2	Milan	5	3	1	1	8	6	+2	7
3	Catania	5	2	2	1	6	5	+1	6
4	Pescara	5	0	4	1	6	7	−1	4
5	Padova	5	0	3	2	4	6	−2	3
6	Genoa	5	0	2	3	8	11	−3	2

=== Group 7 ===
Pos	Team	Pld	W	D	L	GF	GA	GD	Pts
1	Cesena	5	4	1	0	10	3	+7	9
2	Catanzaro	5	3	0	2	8	5	+3	6
3	Sambenedettese	5	1	3	1	3	3	0	5
4	Arezzo	5	2	0	3	4	4	0	4
5	Cremonese	5	1	2	2	5	8	−3	4
6	Paganese	5	0	2	3	1	8	−7	2

=== Group 8 ===
Pos	Team	Pld	W	D	L	GF	GA	GD	Pts
1	Bari	5	4	1	0	9	3	+6	9
2	Internazionale	5	4	0	1	9	3	+6	8
3	Udinese	5	3	0	2	7	5	+2	6
4	Vicenza	5	1	2	2	11	8	+3	4
5	Rimini	5	0	2	3	5	9	−4	2
6	Foggia	5	0	1	4	4	17	−13	1

== Round of 16 ==
Team 1	Agg.	Team 2	1st leg	2nd leg
Juventus	2-1	Bari	1-0	1-1
Internazionale	2-1	Varese	2-0	0-1
Pisa	(a) 2-2	Bologna	0-0	2-2
Avellino	3-6	Roma	0-1	3-5
Cesena	1-2	Napoli	1-0	0-2
Catanzaro	0-3	Torino	0-1	0-2
Hellas Verona	5-0	Ascoli	5-0	0-0
Cagliari	3-6	Milan	1-2	2-4

== Quarter-finals ==
Team 1	Agg.	Team 2	1st leg	2nd leg
Internazionale	3-2	Pisa	3-2	0-0
Torino	2-0	Napoli	1-0	0-0
Hellas Verona	(a) 5-5	Milan	2-2	3-3
Juventus	5-0	Roma	3-0	2-0

== Semi-finals ==
Team 1	Agg.	Team 2	1st leg	2nd leg
Juventus	2-1	Internazionale	2-1	0-0
Hellas Verona	(a) 2-2	Torino	0-1	2-1

== Final ==
=== First leg ===
19 June 1983
20:30

Hellas Verona	2–0	Juventus
Penzo 44'; Volpati 51'

Stadio Marcantonio Bentegodi, Verona
Referee: Rosario Lo Bello

=== Second leg ===
22 June 1983
20:30

Juventus	3–0 (a.e.t.)	Hellas Verona
P.Rossi 8'; Platini 81', 119'

Stadio Comunale, Turin
Referee: Carlo Longhi

Juventus won 3–2 on aggregate.

== Top goalscorers ==
Rank	Player	Club	Goals
1	(Italy) Giuseppe Greco	Ascoli	9
2	(France) Michel Platini	Juventus	7
2	(Italy) Roberto Pruzzo	Roma	7
2	(Italy) Domenico Penzo	Hellas Verona	7
5	(Italy) Aldo Serena	Milan	6
6	(Italy) Paolo Rossi	Juventus	5
