= Ubaldo Righetti =

Italian footballer

Personal information
- Date of birth: 1 March 1963 (age 63)
- Place of birth: Sermoneta, Italy
- Height: 1.82 m (6 ft 0 in)
- Position: Defender

Senior career*
Years	Team	Apps	(Gls)
1980–1987	Roma	112	(1)
1987–1988	Udinese	24	(0)
1988–1990	Lecce	53	(0)
1990–1995	Pescara	87	(2)
Total		276	(3)

International career
1983–1984	Italy U-21	4	(0)
1983–1985	Italy	8	(0)
- * Club domestic league appearances and goals

Ubaldo Righetti (Italian pronunciation: [uˈbaldo riˈɡetti]; born 1 March 1963) is an Italian former professional footballer who played as a defender; he was usually deployed as a centre-back.

== Club career ==
Righetti played 10 seasons in the Italian Serie A for A.S. Roma, Udinese, U.S. Lecce, Bari, and Delfino Pescara 1936. He is mostly remembered for his time with Roma under manager Nils Liedholm (1980–1987), the club with which he made his debut, winning the Serie A title during the 1982–83 season, as well as three Coppa Italia titles, in 1981, 1984, and 1986. During his Roma career, he also helped the club to reach the final of the 1983–84 European Cup; he scored in the resulting penalty shootout that Roma eventually lost to Liverpool in the 1984 European Cup Final. Due to his performances in the European Cup with Roma that season, he notably won the Bravo Award in 1984, which is awarded to the best Under-23 player in European Competitions. Despite his talent, Righetti was accused of never fulfilling his potential demonstrated in earlier years, and the later part of his career was much less successful.

In 1987, he transferred to Udinese for a season, and he was subsequently sent to Serie B side Lecce; during his time with the club, he was sent briefly on loan to local side Bari, with which he won the Mitropa Cup in 1990, later moving to Pescara the following season. He ended his career after four seasons with the Serie B club, helping the club to obtain promotion to Serie A during the 1991–92 season, although they would once again be relegated to Serie B the following season. He ended his career with the club in Serie B after the 1993–94 season.

== International career ==
Righetti made 8 appearances in the Italy national team during his career between 1983 and 1985, all under manager Enzo Bearzot.

== After retirement ==
Following his retirement, he attempted to pursue a coaching career, but he currently works as a commentator for RAI.

He is a city councillor for the city of Rome.

== Honours ==
=== Club ===
Roma

- Serie A: 1982–83
- Coppa Italia: 1980–81, 1983–84, 1985–86

Bari

- Mitropa Cup: 1990

=== Individual ===
- Bravo Award: 1984
