= Attilio Gregori =

Italian footballer (born 1965)

Personal information
- Date of birth: 4 October 1965 (age 61)
- Place of birth: Monterotondo, Italy
- Height: 1.80 m (5 ft 11 in)
- Position: Goalkeeper

Youth career
- –1983: Roma

Senior career*
Years	Team	Apps	(Gls)
1983–1984	Roma	0	(0)
1984–1985	Reggiana	22	(0)
1985–1987	Roma	0	(0)
1987–1990	Genoa	92	(0)
1990–1996	Verona	179	(0)
1995–1996	→ Udinese (loan)	10	(0)
1996–1998	Venezia	57	(0)
1998–1999	Siena	7	(8)
1999–2000	Bari	4	(0)
2000–2001	Savoia	13	(0)
2001–2002	Bari	4	(0)
2002–2003	Lodigiani	21	(1)
Total		410	(1)

International career
1987	Italy U21	1	(0)

Managerial career
- 2003–2004: Terracina
- 2006–2007: Ostia Mare
- 2008–2009: Monterotondo
- 2009–2010: Terracina
- 2011–2012: LVPA Frascati
- 2012–2013: Ostia Mare
- 2014: Viterbese
- 2015: Viterbese
- 2018–2019: Monterotondo
- 2020–2021: Real Monterotondo Scalo
- 2022–2023: Monterotondo
- * Club domestic league appearances and goals

Attilio Gregori (born 4 October 1965), is an Italian former professional footballer and manager, who played as a goalkeeper.

== Playing career ==
Revealed by AS Roma, he was part of the Coppa Italia champion squad twice. With Genoa, he won Serie B in 1988–89, and played 92 times. He also had notable spells at Verona, with 179 appearances, Venezia and Bari.

Gregori stood out for his quality with his feet, even taking a penalty and missing for Hellas Verona against Messina, in the 1990–91 season. He finally scored a penalty goal playing for Lodigiani, against Frosinone, on 24 November 2002.

== Managerial career ==
Gregori coached teams in Serie D and Eccellenza, with emphasis on Viterbese, winning the Eccellenza Lazio in 2013–14 season.

== Personal life ==
Attilio is brother of the also footballer Massimo Gregori. In 2012, he got involved in video poker betting, receiving death threats due to a debt of € 74,000.

== Honours ==
=== Player ===
Roma

- Coppa Italia: 1983–84, 1985–86

Genoa

- Serie B 1988–89

=== Manager ===
Viterbese

- Eccellenza: 2013–14 (Lazio)
