= Paolo Alberto Faccini =

Italian former professional footballer

Personal information
- Date of birth: 22 January 1961 (age 65)
- Place of birth: Verona, Italy
- Height: 1.81 m (5 ft 11 1/2 in)
- Position: Midfielder

Senior career*
Years	Team	Apps	(Gls)
1978–1979	Roma	0	(0)
1979–1980	Nocerina	24	(4)
1980–1983	Roma	14	(1)
1983–1984	Sambenedettese	36	(9)
1984–1985	Avellino	15	(2)
1985–1986	Perugia	23	(2)
1986–1987	Pisa	16	(1)
1987–1988	Sambenedettese	35	(5)
1988–1989	Parma	26	(1)
1989–1990	Padova	26	(2)
1991–1993	Spezia	41	(8)
1993–1994	L'Aquila	15	(0)
- * Club domestic league appearances and goals

Paolo Alberto Faccini (born 22 January 1961, in Verona) is an Italian former professional footballer who played as a midfielder.

He played for 4 seasons in Serie A for Roma and Avellino.
