= Marco Savorani =

Italian footballer (born 1965)

Personal information
- Date of birth: 31 March 1965 (age 61)
- Place of birth: Italy
- Position: Goalkeeper

Team information
- Current team: Italy (goalkeeping coach)

Senior career*
Years	Team	Apps	(Gls)
1981–1984	Roma	0	(0)
1984–1985	Piacenza	0	(0)
1985–1986	Lodigiani	32	(0)
1986–1987	Carrarese	34	(0)
1987–1988	Barletta	25	(0)
1988–1991	Como	77	(0)
1991–1996	Pescara	95	(0)
1996–2000	Gualdo	78	(0)
- * Club domestic league appearances and goals

Marco Savorani (born 31 March 1965) is an Italian football goalkeeper coach and former player who is the goalkeeper coach of Serie A club ACF Fiorentina and the Italy national football team.

== Early life ==
Savorani was born and raised in Rome, Italy.

== Playing career ==
In 1996, he signed for Italian side Gualdo, helping the club reach the playoff semi-finals.

== Managerial career ==
In 2016, Savorani was appointed goalkeeper coach of Italian Serie A side Roma, where he trained Brazil international Alisson Becker.

In 2023, just a few weeks after having been appointed as goalkeeping coach of Fiorentina, Savorani joined Luciano Spalletti's staff in charge of the Italy national team.

== Personal life ==
Savorani has been nicknamed "King Midas".
