= Antonio Di Carlo =

Italian footballer (born 1962)

Personal information
- Date of birth: 6 June 1962 (age 64)
- Place of birth: Rome, Italy
- Height: 1.75 m (5 ft 9 in)
- Position: Midfielder

Senior career*
Years	Team	Apps	(Gls)
1981–1987	Roma	50	(4)
1981–1982	→ Piacenza (loan)	22	(2)
1982–1983	→ Carrarese (loan)	18	(3)
1983–1984	→ Arezzo (loan)	25	(4)
1987–1989	Genoa	32	(3)
1988–1989	→ Parma (loan)	22	(5)
1989–1991	Ancona	42	(3)
1991–1993	Perugia	36	(4)
1993–1994	Avezzano	7	(0)
- * Club domestic league appearances and goals

Antonio Di Carlo (born 6 June 1962) is a retired Italian professional footballer who played as a midfielder.

He played for three seasons in the Serie A for A.S. Roma from 1984 to 1987. He also played for Roma in the UEFA Cup Winners' Cup, scoring a goal against Real Zaragoza.

== Honours ==
Roma

- Coppa Italia winner: 1985–86.
