= Sebastiano Nela =

Italian former footballer (born 1961)

Personal information
- Date of birth: 13 March 1961 (age 65)
- Place of birth: Rapallo, Italy
- Height: 1.77 m (5 ft 10 in)
- Positions: Full-back; centre-back

Senior career*
Years	Team	Apps	(Gls)
1978–1981	Genoa	70	(6)
1981–1992	Roma	281	(16)
1992–1994	Napoli	34	(0)
Total		385	(22)

International career^{‡}
1981–1982	Italy U-21	5	(0)
1984–1987	Italy	5	(0)
- * Club domestic league appearances and goals ‡ National team caps and goals as of 8 January 2009

Sebastiano Nela (Italian pronunciation: [sebaˈstjaːno ˈneːla]; born 13 March 1961) is an Italian former footballer who played as a defender, usually as an offensive-minded full-back due to his crossing ability with his left foot, as well as his speed, stamina, tenacity, physical strength, and work-rate, which enabled him to make attacking runs down the wing and track back to defend his opponents. A versatile and hard-tackling player, he was capable of playing anywhere across the back-line, both on the left or right flanks, and even in the centre, and was even deployed as a central midfielder on occasion, a position which he had often occupied in his youth.

He began his club career with Genoa, and later moved to Roma, where he spent most of his career, winning a Serie A title and three Coppa Italia titles; he retired in 1994, after two seasons Napoli. At international level, he represented the Italy national football team on five occasions between 1984 and 1987, and participated at the 1986 FIFA World Cup and the 1984 Olympics. He is a member of the A.S. Roma Hall of Fame.

== Club career ==
A surly and hard-working left-footed defender, Nela began his career with Genoa. He was bought by Serie A side Roma, making his debut in a 0–0 draw with Avellino on 13 September 1981. He made 28 appearances for the Roma team that won the Scudetto in 1983.

Nela was badly injured to his knee in an accident in 1987 and was forced to miss almost a year of football. The singer Antonello Venditti dedicated his song "Correndo correndo", which appears on his 1988 album In questo mondo di ladri, to Nela.

Nela left Roma in 1992 to join Napoli having won the Scudetto and three Italian cups. He retired after the 1993–94 season having made a total of 315 appearances in Serie A.

== International career ==
Nela's performances for Roma earned him a call up to the Italy national team, making his debut against West Germany on 22 May 1984.

Nela made a total of five appearances for the Italy national team between 1984 and 1987. Nela was a member of the Italian squad for the 1986 FIFA World Cup, although he did not play; Italy went out in the round of 16. He also made three appearances at the 1984 Olympics in Los Angeles, helping Italy to a fourth-place finish in the tournament.

== After retirement ==
Following his retirement, Nela has worked as a commentator for various national and satellite channels; he currently works for Mediaset Premium.

== Honours ==
=== Club ===
Roma

- Serie A: 1982–83
- Coppa Italia: 1983–84, 1985–86, 1990–91

=== Individual ===
- Serie A Team of The Year: 1983
- A.S. Roma Hall of Fame: 2013
