= Paulo Roberto Falcão =

Brazilian footballer and manager (born 1953)

Falcão
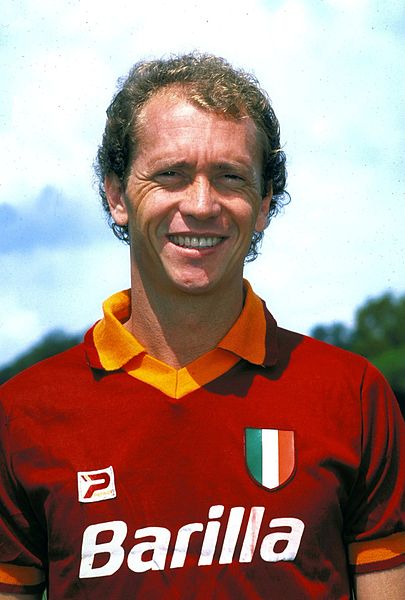
- Falcão with Roma during the 1983–84 Serie A season

Personal information
- Full name: Paulo Roberto Falcão
- Date of birth: 16 October 1953 (age 73)
- Place of birth: Abelardo Luz, Brazil
- Height: 1.83 m (6 ft 0 in)
- Position: Midfielder

Youth career
- 1965–1972: Internacional

Senior career*
Years	Team	Apps	(Gls)
1972–1980	Internacional	342	(58)
1980–1985	Roma	107	(22)
1985–1986	São Paulo	12	(0)
Total		461	(80)

International career
1972	Brazil U23	12	(2)
1976–1986	Brazil	28	(6)

Managerial career
- 1990–1991: Brazil
- 1991–1992: Club América
- 1993: Internacional
- 1994: Japan
- 2011: Internacional
- 2012: Bahia
- 2015–2016: Sport Recife
- 2016: Internacional
- * Club domestic league appearances and goals

Paulo Roberto Falcão (Brazilian Portuguese pronunciation: [ˈpawlu ʁoˈbɛʁtu fawˈkɐ̃w]; born 16 October 1953), usually known as simply Falcão, is a Brazilian former footballer and football manager. He is considered one of the greatest Brazilian players of all time and one of the greatest midfielders in football history, and one of the best players in the world in his position at his peak in the 1980s.

Falcão is widely considered one of the best players in Internacional and Roma history, playing also for São Paulo. At one stage, he was the world's highest paid footballer.

Due to his success and performances with Roma, Falcão earned the nickname "the eighth King of Rome" from the fans, like Amedeo Amadei before him, and was inducted into the club's Hall of Fame in 2013.

For the Brazil national team, Falcão was capped 34 times between February 1976 and June 1986. He appeared at the 1982 FIFA World Cup, playing in midfield alongside Zico, Sócrates and Éder, considered one of the greatest Brazilian national teams ever. He was named by Pelé one of the 125 Greatest Living Footballers at a FIFA Awards ceremony in 2004. Colombian forward Radamel Falcao's father was a footballer and football fan and named him after Falcão.

== Club career ==
=== Internacional (1972–1980) ===
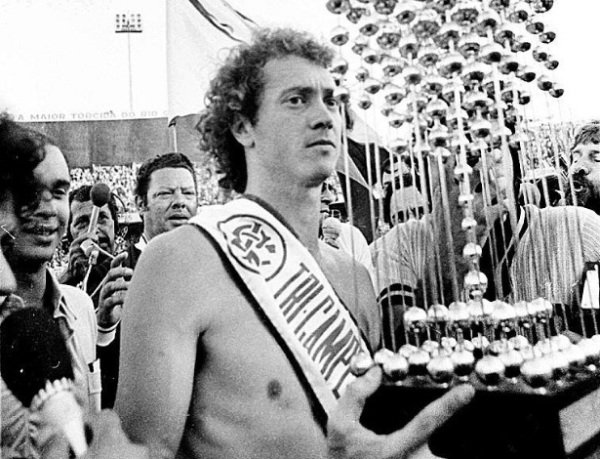
Paulo Roberto Falcão holding the trophy of the 1979 Brazilian Championship

Falcão joined Internacional's youth system at the age of eleven, having been selected in a trial organised by coach Jofre Funchal. Initially playing as a left-sided midfielder, he subsequently moved into a more defensive midfield role during his development at the club. He was promoted to the senior team under manager Dino Sani in 1973, establishing himself as a regular during the following seasons.

In 1979, Internacional won a third Brazilian championship, becoming the first team to complete an unbeaten campaign in the competition. Falcão was one of the team's leading players, contributing to its midfield organisation and attacking play. Internacional also won five Campeonato Gaúcho titles during his time at the club, in 1973, 1974, 1975, 1976 and 1978.

Falcão won Placar magazine's Bola de Ouro award twice as the best player in the Brazilian championships of 1978 and 1979. In 1979, Falcão achieved the highest score in the history of the Bola de Ouro.

In 1980, Internacional reached the Copa Libertadores final for the first time, facing Uruguayan club Nacional. After a goalless draw in Porto Alegre, Internacional lost the second leg 1–0 in Montevideo. The final marked the end of Falcão's playing career at the club, as he subsequently transferred to Roma in Italy.

=== Roma (1980–1985) ===
In 1980, Falcão transferred from Internacional to Italian club Roma, joining a team managed by Nils Liedholm. His arrival coincided with a period of increasing competitiveness for the club, which had not won the Italian league championship since 1942. Initially requiring time to adapt to Italian football, Falcão became an influential figure in Roma's midfield, earning recognition for his technical ability, tactical intelligence and leadership. His performances and importance to the team were subsequently highlighted by the club in its retrospective accounts of his career.

During the 1980–81 season, Falcão made 25 Serie A appearances and scored three goals as Roma finished second behind Juventus. The club also won the Coppa Italia, defeating Torino on penalties in the final, with Falcão converting the decisive spot kick. In the following season, he scored six league goals in 24 appearances as Roma finished third.

Falcão played a central role in Roma's 1982–83 Serie A title victory, the club's second Italian championship and its first in 41 years. He scored seven goals in 27 league appearances and was widely recognised for his contribution to the team's attacking play and organisation. Following a defeat to Juventus during the title race, Falcão publicly expressed confidence in Roma's prospects and subsequently scored against Pisa as the team maintained its championship challenge. His performances established him as one of the club's most celebrated players, earning him the nickname L'ottavo re di Roma ("the eighth King of Rome").

In the 1983–84 season, Roma finished second in Serie A and won another Coppa Italia. The club also reached its first European Cup final, defeating IFK Göteborg, CSKA Sofia, Dynamo Berlin and Dundee United during the competition. Falcão missed the first leg of the semi-final against Dundee United because of a knee injury but returned for the second leg, in which Roma overturned a 2–0 deficit with a 3–0 victory. He later recalled receiving an injection to enable him to play despite the injury.

Roma faced Liverpool in the European Cup final at the Stadio Olimpico on 30 May 1984. The match finished 1–1 after extra time, and Liverpool won the subsequent penalty shoot-out. Falcão played throughout the match despite his continuing knee problems but did not take a penalty. His decision subsequently became a subject of controversy. In a 2018 interview, Falcão explained that he had required another injection to play and had informed Liedholm that he was physically unable to take a penalty after 120 minutes. He stated that he had originally been designated as Roma's fifth penalty taker, although the shoot-out was decided before a fifth Roma attempt became necessary.

Falcão's final season at Roma was severely affected by his knee problems, restricting him to four Serie A appearances and one goal in 1984–85. His relationship with the club's management subsequently deteriorated amid disagreements concerning his medical treatment and contractual obligations. On 1 August 1985, an Italian football disciplinary tribunal ruled in favour of Roma and terminated his contract following a dispute between the player and the club. Falcão later returned to Brazil and joined São Paulo.

Across five seasons at Roma, Falcão made 152 competitive appearances and scored 27 goals, including 107 appearances and 22 goals in Serie A. He won one league championship and two Coppa Italia titles, and was inducted into Roma's Hall of Fame in 2012. In its official retrospective, the club identified his technical qualities, tactical awareness and influence on his teammates as defining features of his contribution to Roma's history.

=== São Paulo (1985–1986) ===
Following his departure from Roma in 1985, Falcão returned to Brazil and joined São Paulo. His signing attracted considerable attention, and he made his debut on 26 September 1985 in a 1–0 friendly victory over his former club Internacional at the Morumbi Stadium.

Falcão was part of the team that won the 1985 Campeonato Paulista, defeating Portuguesa 5–2 on aggregate in the final. Falcão appeared in the second leg on 22 December, a 2–1 victory at the Morumbi, before being substituted by Freitas. His playing time was limited during his spell at São Paulo, with knee problems continuing to affect his performances.

Falcão made his final appearance for the club on 6 February 1986, in a 2–0 victory over Fluminense in the Campeonato Estadual Rio–São Paulo.

== International career ==
Falcão made 34 appearances for the Brazil national team between 1976 and 1986, scoring six goals. He was a member of the side that finished third at the 1979 Copa América, scoring his only goal of the tournament in the second leg of the semi-finals, a 2–2 draw against eventual champions Paraguay, although the latter nation advanced to the final 4–3 on aggregate. He was surprisingly left out of Brazil's 1978 World Cup squad, despite being included on the 40–player shortlist before the tournament. This happened because, influenced by national teammate Emerson Leão (who claimed to have done the same with Zagallo four years earlier), Falcão unsuccessfully demanded from manager Cláudio Coutinho a definition about his situation in the team.

Falcão was a key part of Brazil's celebrated 1982 World Cup team, playing along with Toninho Cerezo, Zico, Éder and Socrates in a 4–2–2–2 formation. The team is widely regarded as one of the best teams not to win the World Cup. Initially expected to serve as a substitute during the tournament, Falcão entered the starting lineup after Cerezo's suspension, winning 2—1 against the Soviet Union. Falcão went on to start in each match of the tournament and scored the fourth goal in the match against Scotland that ended 4–1 to the Brazilians, plus another goal in the decisive 4–0 win over New Zealand.

In the second phase of the World Cup, in the so-called "Group of Death," Brazil obtained a 3–1 win against the reigning World Champions and rivals Argentina, meaning that the Brazilians needed only a draw in their next game against Italy to advance to the semi-finals. However, Brazil were beaten by a Paolo Rossi hat trick as Italy won 3–2, advancing in their place. Falcão scored Brazil's second equaliser with a long-range strike that deflected off Italian defender Giuseppe Bergomi. The defeat and resulting elimination affected Falcão and several of his teammates heavily; after the match, he was said to be so distressed that he wanted to give up football. Nevertheless, Falcão was elected as the tournament's second best player, winning the Silver Ball.

Although his form had declined after an injury requiring surgery in 1985, Falcão was called up for the Brazil 1986 World Cup squad. During the World Cup in Mexico, Falcão played in two games, coming on as substitute against both Spain and Algeria. After Brazil's elimination in the quarterfinals, Falcão retired from football.

== Coaching career ==
From 1990 to 1991, Falcão was the manager of the Brazil national team, leading the team to a second place finish at the 1991 Copa América, behind rivals Argentina. His second and longest coaching experience was with América from 1991 to 1993. He also coached Internacional in 1993. After a brief hiatus, in 1994, he was appointed manager of the Japan national team. In April 2011, after 16 years without managing a club, he was signed by Internacional, replacing Celso Roth. Following three consecutive defeats in the Brazilian league, he was sacked in July.

In February 2012, Falcão returned into management, signing an eleven-month deal as head coach of Bahia. He only returned to coaching duties in September 2015, being appointed manager at Sport.

Falcão returned to Internacional in July 2016, but was sacked after three losses and two draws one month later. On 17 November 2022, he joined Santos as a sporting coordinator.

On 4 August 2023, Falcão left his role at Santos.

== Style of play ==
An elegant and technically gifted player, with an eye for goal from midfield, and an ability to orchestrate his team's attacking moves, Falcão usually functioned in a holding role as a deep-lying playmaker (regista), although he was capable of aiding his team defensively, as well as creatively and offensively, due to his physique, work-rate, and tenacity. He was known in particular for his flair, control, vision, passing and long-range shooting ability, as well as his tactical intelligence, organisational ability and leadership. His role has also been likened to that of a metodista ("centre-half," in Italian football jargon), due to his ability to dictate play in midfield as well as assist his team defensively.

== Personal life ==
Falcão was born in Abelardo Luz, in the Southern Brazilian state of Santa Catarina. His father is Portuguese-Brazilian and his mother Azize has Italian origins, from Calabria.

In 1993, Falcão married attorney Rosane Leal Damazio, with whom he had a son, Paulo Roberto Falcão Filho, born on July 21, 1993. Since 2003, Falcão has been married to the journalist Cristina Ranzolin, with whom he has a daughter, the actress Antônia Ranzolin Falcão, born in the following year (2004).

He also worked for many years as a football commentator for Rede Globo and for its sports oriented channel SporTV.

On 4 August 2023, Falcão was accused of sexual harassment by an employee of the apartment hotel where he lived in Santos.

On 21 October 2023, the case against Falcão was closed due to a lack of evidence.

== Philanthropy and community work ==
In 1998, Falcão co-founded the Instituto da Criança com Diabetes do Rio Grande do Sul (ICDRS), a nonprofit organization dedicated to supporting children and adolescents with Type 1 diabetes. He has remained involved with the institution since its foundation and serves as President of its Board of Administration. In April 2026, Falcão participated in a retrospective videocast marking nearly three decades of the institute's work and discussing the importance of diabetes treatment and public awareness.

During the COVID-19 pandemic in 2020, Falcão joined Zico, Júnior, Cerezo, Careca and other former Brazil internationals in a fundraising campaign supporting favela communities through the Central Única das Favelas (CUFA).

== Career statistics ==
=== Club ===
Appearances and goals by club, season and competition
Club	Season	League			State League (Note: Includes Campeonato Gaúcho, Campeonato Paulista)		Cup (Note: Includes Copa do Brasil, Coppa Italia)		Continental (Note: Includes Copa Libertadores, European Cup Winners' Cup, European Cup, UEFA Cup)		Other (Note: Includes Taça dos Campeões Estaduais Rio – São Paulo)		Total	
Club	Season	Division	Apps	Goals	Apps	Goals	Apps	Goals	Apps	Goals	Apps	Goals	Apps	Goals
Internacional	1973	Série A	34	0	2	0	—		—		—		36	0
Internacional	1974	Série A	21	2	18	0	—		—		—		39	2
Internacional	1975	Série A	19	1	24	7	—		—		—		43	8
Internacional	1976	Série A	15	5	26	4	—		6	1	—		47	10
Internacional	1977	Série A	9	0	32	7	—		7	0	—		48	7
Internacional	1978	Série A	27	5	34	7	—		—		—		61	12
Internacional	1979	Série A	20	6	45	11	—		—		—		65	17
Internacional	1980	Série A	13	3	3	0	—		9	2	—		25	5
Internacional	Total		158	22	184	36	—		22	3	—		364	61
Roma	1980–81	Serie A	25	3	—		5	0	2	1	—		32	4
Roma	1981–82	Serie A	24	6	—		2	0	4	0	—		30	6
Roma	1982–83	Serie A	27	7	—		4	1	8	2	—		39	10
Roma	1983–84	Serie A	27	5	—		8	0	8	1	—		43	6
Roma	1984–85	Serie A	4	1	—		3	0	1	0	—		8	1
Roma	Total		107	22	—		22	1	23	4	—		152	27
São Paulo	1985	Série A	1	0	11	0	—		—		—		12	0
São Paulo	1986	Série A	0	0	0	0	—		—		2	1	2	1
São Paulo	Total		1	0	11	0	—		—		2	1	14	1
Career total			266	44	195	36	22	1	45	7	2	1	530	89

=== International ===
Appearances and goals by national team and year
National team	Year	Apps	Goals
Brazil	1976	5	1
Brazil	1977	4	0
Brazil	1978	0	0
Brazil	1979	5	1
Brazil	1980	0	0
Brazil	1981	0	0
Brazil	1982	7	4
Brazil	1983	0	0
Brazil	1984	0	0
Brazil	1985	0	0
Brazil	1986	7	0
Total		28	6

Scores and results list Brazil's goal tally first, score column indicates score after each Falcão goal.

List of international goals scored by Paulo Roberto Falcão
No.	Date	Venue	Opponent	Score	Result	Competition	Ref.
1	1 December 1976	Maracanã Stadium, Rio de Janeiro, Brazil	Soviet Union	–	2–0	Friendly	
2	31 October 1979	Maracanã Stadium, Rio de Janeiro, Brazil	Paraguay	1–0	2–2	1979 Copa América	
3	27 May 1982	Estádio Parque do Sabiá, Uberlândia, Brazil	Republic of Ireland	1–0	7–0	Friendly	
4	18 June 1982	Estadio Benito Villamarín, Seville, Spain	Scotland	4–1	4–1	1982 FIFA World Cup	
5	23 June 1982	Estadio Benito Villamarín, Seville, Spain	New Zealand	3–0	4–0	1982 FIFA World Cup	
6	5 July 1982	Sarrià Stadium, Barcelona, Spain	Italy	2–2	2–3	1982 FIFA World Cup	

== Managerial statistics ==
As of match played 7 August 2016

Managerial record by team and tenure
Team	Nat	From	To	Record								Ref
Team	Nat	From	To	G	W	D	L	GF	GA	GD	Win %	Ref
Brazil	(Brazil)	16 August 1990	20 August 1991	17	6	7	4	22	18	+4	35.29	
Club América	(Mexico)	25 November 1991	26 November 1992	51	21	14	16	73	66	+7	41.18	
Internacional	(Brazil)	29 July 1993	10 February 1994	14	5	4	5	17	20	−3	35.71	
Japan	(Japan)	11 February 1994	31 October 1994	9	3	4	2	16	13	+3	33.33	
Internacional	(Brazil)	10 April 2011	18 July 2011	19	8	5	6	30	24	+6	42.11	
Bahia	(Brazil)	6 February 2012	20 July 2012	36	16	10	10	62	40	+22	44.44	
Sport Recife	(Brazil)	20 September 2015	18 April 2016	34	17	6	11	49	33	+16	50.00	
Internacional	(Brazil)	12 July 2016	8 August 2016	5	0	2	3	6	10	−4	0.00	
Career Total				185	76	52	57	275	224	+51	41.08	—

== Honours ==
Internacional

- Campeonato Brasileiro Série A: 1975, 1976, 1979
- Campeonato Gaúcho: 1973, 1974, 1975, 1976, 1978
- Copa Libertadores runner-up: 1980

Roma

- Serie A: 1982–83
- Coppa Italia: 1980–81, 1983–84
- European Cup: runner-up 1983–84

São Paulo

- Campeonato Paulista: 1985
- Taça dos Campeões Estaduais Rio – São Paulo: 1985

Individual

- Bola de Prata: 1975, 1978, 1979
- Bola de Ouro: 1978, 1979
- Bronze ball South American Player of the Year: 1979
- FIFA World Cup Silver Ball: 1982
- FIFA World Cup All-Star Team: 1982
- World XI: 1982
- Silver ball South American Player of the Year: 1982
- Onze de Bronze: 1982
- World Soccer World XI: 1982, 1983
- Guerin Sportivo All-Star Team: 1982, 1983
- Serie A Team of The Year: 1982, 1983, 1984
- Onze d'Argent: 1983
- Guerin Sportivo World Player of the Year: 1983
- World Soccer's 100 Greatest Footballers of All Time: 1999
- FIFA 100: 2004
- A.S. Roma Hall of Fame: 2012
- Italian Football Hall of Fame: 2016
- Brazilian Football Museum Hall of Fame
- Golden Foot: 2019, as football legend

== Bibliography ==
- Gregori, Claudio (2011). Il Calcio di Falcao ai Raggi X. I quaderni della Gazzetta dello Sport (in Italian). Vol. 17. Milan, Italy: RCS Quotidiani.

Awards
Preceded by inaugural	FIFA World Cup Silver Ball; 1982	Succeeded by Harald Schumacher
