= Paolo Baldieri =

Italian footballer

Personal information
- Date of birth: 2 February 1965 (age 61)
- Place of birth: Rome, Italy
- Height: 1.77 m (5 ft 9 1/2 in)
- Position: Striker

Senior career*
Years	Team	Apps	(Gls)
1980–1981	Romulea	7	(1)
1981–1984	Roma	1	(0)
1984–1986	Pisa	67	(12)
1986–1987	Roma	14	(3)
1987–1988	Empoli	27	(1)
1988–1989	Avellino	31	(6)
1989–1990	Roma	11	(0)
1990–1991	Pescara	19	(1)
1991–1995	Lecce	116	(20)
1995–1996	Perugia	6	(1)
1996–1997	Savoia	12	(1)
1997–1998	Civitavecchia	?	(8)
2005	CityModa Lecce		

International career
1984–1986	Italy U-21	14	(9)
- * Club domestic league appearances and goals

Paolo Baldieri (born 2 February 1965 in Rome) is an Italian former professional footballer.

He was considered one of the most promising young Italian forwards of the early 1980s and collected 14 caps and 9 goals for the Italy national under-21 football team.

He played in the Serie A for 6 seasons (112 games, 18 goals) for A.S. Roma, Pisa Calcio, Empoli F.C. and U.S. Lecce.
