= Sandro Tovalieri =

Italian footballer and coach

Personal information
- Date of birth: 25 February 1965 (age 61)
- Place of birth: Pomezia, Italy
- Height: 1.77 m (5 ft 9 1/2 in)
- Position: Striker

Team information
- Current team: Roma (youth manager)

Senior career*
Years	Team	Apps	(Gls)
1982–1986	Roma	22	(3)
1983–1984	→ Pescara (loan)	35	(10)
1984–1985	→ Arezzo (loan)	34	(10)
1986–1987	Avellino	20	(3)
1987–1990	Arezzo	58	(20)
1990–1992	Ancona	71	(22)
1992–1995	Bari	82	(30)
1995–1996	Atalanta	30	(6)
1996	Reggiana	11	(4)
1996–1997	Cagliari	23	(12)
1997	Sampdoria	9	(3)
1997–1998	Perugia	29	(10)
1998–1999	Ternana	20	(1)
1999–2000	Reggiana	7	(0)

International career
1984–1985	Italy U-21	2	(0)

Managerial career
- 2005–2013: Roma (youth)
- * Club domestic league appearances and goals

Sandro Tovalieri (born 25 February 1965) is an Italian professional football coach and a former player, who played as a forward. He serves as a coach for the A.S. Roma youth sector.

== Playing career ==
Tovalieri, nicknamed "Il Cobra", was born in Pomezia. He played for seven seasons (150 games, 48 goals) in the Italian Serie A for A.S. Roma, Avellino, A.S. Bari, Atalanta B.C., A.C. Reggiana 1919, Cagliari Calcio, U.C. Sampdoria and Perugia Calcio.

With Roma he won the Serie A title during the 1982–83 season, although he remained an unused substitute throughout the entire campaign and did not make a single appearance; he subsequently also won the Coppa Italia during the 1985–86 season, scoring a goal in the final. He later played in the UEFA Cup for U.C. Sampdoria.

== Honours ==
=== Player ===
==== Club ====
Roma

- Serie A champion: 1982–83.
- Coppa Italia winner: 1985–86.

==== Individual ====
- One of Top 10 scorers in Serie A: 1994–95 (tied for 5th place, 17 goals), 1996–97 (4th place, 16 goals).
