= Settimio Lucci =

Italian footballer and coach

Personal information
- Date of birth: 21 September 1965 (age 61)
- Place of birth: Marino, Italy
- Height: 1.78 m (5 ft 10 in)
- Position: Defender

Senior career*
Years	Team	Apps	(Gls)
1983–1986	Roma	17	(0)
1983–1984	→ Avellino (loan)	14	(1)
1986–1988	Empoli	46	(1)
1988–1991	Udinese	104	(1)
1991–1997	Piacenza	198	(1)
1997–1999	Verona	46	(0)
1999–2000	Ternana	23	(0)
2000–2001	Ancona	9	(0)

International career
1987–1988	Italy U21	8	(0)

Managerial career
- 2008–2009: Pizzighettone
- * Club domestic league appearances and goals

Settimio Lucci (born 21 September 1965) is an Italian professional football coach and a former player who played as a defender. He represented Italy at under-21 level.

He played 9 seasons (204 games, 3 goals) in Serie A for Avellino, Roma, Empoli, Udinese and Piacenza. He played for Roma in the European Cup Winners' Cup.

== Honours ==
=== Club ===
Roma

- Coppa Italia winner: 1985–86

=== International ===
Italy U21

- Represented Italy at the 1988 UEFA European Under-21 Championship
