= Paolo Mastrantonio =

Italian footballer

Personal information
- Date of birth: July 17, 1967 (age 59)
- Place of birth: Rome, Italy
- Height: 1.75 m (5 ft 9 in)
- Position: Defender

Senior career*
Years	Team	Apps	(Gls)
1986–1987	Roma	1	(0)
1987–1988	Genoa	18	(0)
1988–1989	Avellino	4	(0)
1989–1990	Montevarchi	10	(0)
1990–1991	Venezia	25	(0)
1991–1992	Casertana	15	(0)
1992–1994	Vicenza	20	(0)
- * Club domestic league appearances and goals

Paolo Mastrantonio (born July 17, 1967 in Rome) is a retired Italian professional football player.

His first ever professional game also turned out to be his last in the Serie A as he played in the lower leagues for the rest of his career.

Mastrantonio made 15 appearances in Serie B with U.S. Casertana 1908 from 1991 to 1992.
