= Claudio Pieri =

Italian football referee

- Born: 21 October 1940; Pescia, Italy
- Died: 13 July 2018 (aged 77); Sestri Levante, Italy

Domestic
Years	League	Role
1975-1987	Italian Serie A	Referee
1983-1987	UEFA and FIFA	Referee

Claudio Pieri (21 October 1940 – 13 July 2018) was an Italian football referee.

== Career ==
Belonging to the AIA section of Genoa, he began his career in Serie A in the Inter - Roma match on 18 May 1975, ending 0-2 for the Romans.

For the 2009-2010 season, he was involved in the Talent and Mentor project, aimed at the accurate training of young referees.

== Controversy ==
In 1987, he was disqualified by the AIA Disciplinary Committee for having received several checks from the management of Palermo as funding for his election campaign with the DC, that were not reported in time to the AIA technical bodies.
