= Roberto Pruzzo =

Italian football player and manager (born 1955)

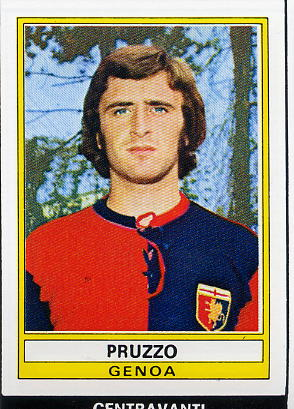
- Pruzzo in 1972

Personal information
- Date of birth: 1 April 1955 (age 71)
- Place of birth: Crocefieschi, Genoa, Italy
- Height: 1.75 m (5 ft 9 in)
- Position: Forward

Youth career
- 1971–1973: Genoa

Senior career*
Years	Team	Apps	(Gls)
1973–1978	Genoa	143	(57)
1978–1988	Roma	240	(106)
1988–1989	Fiorentina	13	(1)
Total		396	(164)

International career
1978–1982	Italy	6	(0)

Managerial career
- 1998–1999: Viareggio
- 1999–2000: Teramo
- 2000–2001: Alessandria
- 2002: Palermo
- 2004–2005: Foggia (assistant coach)
- 2005–2006: Sambenedettese (assistant coach)
- 2008–2009: Centobuchi
- 2009: Genoa (youth)
- * Club domestic league appearances and goals

Roberto Pruzzo (Italian pronunciation: [roˈbɛrto ˈpruttso]; born 1 April 1955) is an Italian former football player and coach who played as a forward. He represented Italy at UEFA Euro 1980.

== Club career ==
Born at Crocefieschi, in the province of Genova, Pruzzo made his debut in professional football for Genoa in 1973. There he remained for six seasons, scoring 57 goals in 143 matches, winning the Serie B title during the 1975–76 season, as well as the top scoring award.

Pruzzo passed to Roma in 1979, for the then record sum of 3 billions liras. Here he became famous as one of the most effective Italian forwards of the 1980s, winning one scudetto during the 1982–83 season, and four Italian Cups in 1980, 1981, 1983, and 1986. He also won the Serie A top scorer award three times, in 1981, 1982, and 1986, as well as the Coppa Italia top scorer award in 1980. He also scored a goal in the 1984 European Cup Final, when Roma, playing at home, was beaten on penalties by Liverpool.

He ended his career in 1989 after a season for Fiorentina. He helped the club to a seventh-place finish in Serie A that season, and he scored the decisive goal against his former club in the UEFA Cup playoff match, from a Roberto Baggio assist, which allowed Fiorentina to qualify for the UEFA Cup the following season. Pruzzo is the sole Italian player to have scored 5 goals in a single Serie A match (Roma vs. Avellino, 1986).

== International career ==
Despite a fantastic club career, Pruzzo only managed to play six games (no goals) for the Italy national team between 1978 and 1982. He represented his country at the 1980 UEFA European Championship in Italy, where they reached the semi-finals, finishing the tournament in fourth place, and also at the 1980 Mundialito. He was left out of Enzo Bearzot's 1982 World Cup-winning squad.

Pruzzo did, however, score in an Italian shirt, representing Italy in the 1991 World Cup of Masters. Pruzzo scored twice in the opening round.

== Style of play ==
A prolific goalscorer, Pruzzo was considered one of the best Italian forwards of his generation, and he is regarded as one of Roma's greatest players. He was known as a physically strong and hard-working centre-forward throughout his career, with good technique, link-up play, hold-up play, and an eye for goal, but was renowned in particular for his heading accuracy, elevation, and ability in the air.

== Coaching career ==
In the late 1990s, Pruzzo started a much less notable coaching career which saw him at the helm of Viareggio, Teramo (Serie C2), Alessandria (Serie C1) and a five summer days long time at Palermo (Serie B), during the change of ownership time from Franco Sensi to Maurizio Zamparini. He then served as assistant coach of Giuseppe Giannini at Serie C1 teams Foggia and Sambenedettese.

He last served as head coach of Serie D amateurs Centobuchi from December 2008 to March 2009.

In the season 2012–13 he was named Sports manager of Savona in Lega Pro Seconda Divisione.

In 2012, he was inducted into the AS Roma Hall of Fame.

== Honours ==
Genoa

- Serie B: 1975–76

Roma

- Serie A: 1982–83
- Coppa Italia: 1979–80, 1980–81, 1983–84, 1985–86

Individual

- Serie A top scorer: 1980–81, 1981–82, 1985–86
- Coppa Italia top scorer: 1979–80
- AS Roma Hall of Fame: 2012
