= 1982–83 Serie A =

81st season of top-tier Italian football

Serie A
- Season: 1982–83
- Dates: 12 September 1982 – 15 May 1983
- Champions: Roma; 2nd title
- Relegated: Cagliari; Cesena; Catanzaro
- European Cup: Roma
- Cup Winners' Cup: Juventus
- UEFA Cup: Internazionale; Hellas Verona
- Matches: 240
- Goals: 505 (2.1 per match)
- Top goalscorer: Michel Platini (16 goals)

Serie A 1982-83 team distribution

The 1982–83 Serie A season was won by Roma.

== Teams ==
Hellas Verona, Sampdoria and Pisa had been promoted from Serie B.

== Final classification ==
Pos	Team	Pld	W	D	L	GF	GA	GD	Pts	Qualification or relegation
1	Roma (C)	30	16	11	3	47	24	+23	43	Qualification to European Cup
2	Juventus	30	15	9	6	49	26	+23	39	Qualification to Cup Winners' Cup
3	Internazionale	30	12	14	4	40	23	+17	38	Qualification to UEFA Cup
4	Hellas Verona	30	11	13	6	37	31	+6	35	Qualification to UEFA Cup
5	Fiorentina	30	12	10	8	36	25	+11	34	
6	Udinese	30	6	20	4	25	29	−4	32	
7	Sampdoria	30	8	15	7	31	30	+1	31	
8	Torino	30	9	12	9	30	28	+2	30	
9	Avellino	30	8	12	10	29	34	−5	28	
10	Napoli	30	7	14	9	22	29	−7	28	
11	Pisa	30	8	11	11	27	27	0	27	
12	Genoa	30	6	15	9	34	38	−4	27	
13	Ascoli	30	9	9	12	32	37	−5	27	
14	Cagliari (R)	30	6	14	10	23	33	−10	26	Relegation to Serie B
15	Cesena (R)	30	4	14	12	22	35	−13	22	Relegation to Serie B
16	Catanzaro (R)	30	2	9	19	21	56	−35	13	Relegation to Serie B

Source: Panini
Rules for classification: 1) points; 2) Head-to-head points; 3) goal difference; 4) number of goals scored.
(C) Champions; (R) Relegated

== Results ==
Home \ Away	ASC	AVE	CAG	CAT	CES	FIO	GEN	INT	JUV	NAP	PIS	ROM	SAM	TOR	UDI	VER
Ascoli	—	2–1	2–0	3–2	1–1	1–0	0–0	0–0	2–0	2–1	2–2	1–1	2–0	2–0	3–0	2–3
Avellino	2–0	—	0–0	4–0	1–0	2–0	2–0	1–2	1–1	0–0	1–0	1–1	0–0	2–0	1–1	3–0
Cagliari	3–1	1–1	—	1–0	0–0	0–0	1–1	0–2	1–2	1–0	1–1	1–3	1–0	0–0	0–0	2–1
Catanzaro	1–0	1–1	1–2	—	1–1	0–1	2–2	1–2	1–2	1–2	0–2	0–0	1–1	0–0	1–1	2–1
Cesena	1–1	2–0	0–0	0–0	—	3–3	0–1	2–2	2–2	0–0	0–0	1–1	0–2	2–0	1–0	1–2
Fiorentina	1–0	3–0	3–1	4–0	4–0	—	2–1	0–0	0–1	1–0	2–1	2–2	3–1	0–0	1–2	1–1
Genoa	0–0	1–1	3–0	4–1	2–1	0–3	—	2–3	1–0	0–0	1–0	1–1	1–1	1–1	2–3	0–1
Internazionale	2–0	2–0	2–0	5–0	3–1	0–0	2–1	—	0–0	2–2	0–1	0–0	1–2	1–3	1–1	1–1
Juventus	5–0	4–1	1–1	3–1	2–0	3–0	4–2	0–2	—	3–0	3–2	2–1	1–1	1–0	4–0	0–0
Napoli	0–0	1–1	1–0	2–0	1–0	1–0	1–1	1–1	0–0	—	2–1	1–3	0–1	1–0	0–0	1–2
Pisa	2–1	2–0	0–0	0–0	1–0	0–0	0–0	1–1	0–0	2–0	—	1–2	3–2	0–1	0–0	0–1
Roma	2–1	2–0	1–0	2–0	1–0	3–1	2–0	2–1	1–2	5–2	3–1	—	1–0	3–1	0–0	1–0
Sampdoria	1–1	0–0	1–1	4–2	0–0	0–0	2–2	0–0	1–0	1–1	1–0	1–0	—	0–0	1–3	2–2
Torino	2–0	4–1	3–2	1–0	0–1	2–0	1–1	0–0	3–2	1–1	0–2	1–1	3–0	—	0–0	1–1
Udinese	2–1	1–1	1–1	2–1	3–1	0–0	1–1	0–0	0–0	0–0	1–1	1–1	0–4	2–2	—	0–0
Hellas Verona	2–1	3–0	2–2	3–1	1–1	0–1	2–2	1–2	2–1	0–0	2–1	1–1	1–1	1–0	0–0	—

Legend: Blue = home team win; Yellow = draw; Red = away team win.

== Top goalscorers ==
Rank	Player	Club	Goals
1	(France) Michel Platini	Juventus	16
2	(Italy) Alessandro Altobelli	Internazionale	15
2	(Italy) Domenico Penzo	Hellas Verona	15
4	(Italy) Roberto Pruzzo	Roma	12
5	(Italy) Massimo Briaschi	Genoa	9
5	(Italy) Giancarlo Antognoni	Fiorentina	9
5	(Italy) Luigi Piras	Cagliari	9

== Attendances ==
#	Club	Average
1	Napoli	58,744
2	Roma	54,510
3	Internazionale	45,171
4	Fiorentina	44,696
5	Juventus	41,877
6	Udinese	37,901
7	Sampdoria	34,502
8	Genoa	34,290
9	Hellas Verona	32,169
10	Torino	30,014
11	Cagliari	27,458
12	Pisa	19,754
13	Avellino	19,312
14	Cesena	18,728
15	Ascoli	18,548
16	Catanzaro	10,626

== References and sources ==
- Almanacco Illustrato del Calcio - La Storia 1898-2004, Panini Edizioni, Modena, September 2005
