= 1985–86 Coppa Italia =

Tournament details
- Country: Italy
- Dates: 21 Aug 1985 – 14 June 1986
- Teams: 48

Final positions
- Champions: Roma (6th title)
- Runners-up: Sampdoria

Tournament statistics
- Matches played: 150
- Goals scored: 357 (2.38 per match)
- Top goal scorer: Luca Cecconi (9 goals)

The 1985–86 Coppa Italia, the 39th Coppa Italia was an Italian Football Federation domestic cup competition won by Roma.

== Group stage ==
=== Group 1 ===
Pos	Team	Pld	W	D	L	GF	GA	GD	Pts
1	Fiorentina (1)	5	4	1	0	9	2	+7	9
2	Juventus (1)	5	2	2	1	10	5	+5	6
3	Monza(2)	5	2	2	1	6	5	+1	6
4	Perugia(2)	5	1	2	2	3	3	0	4
5	Palermo(2)	5	2	0	3	5	10	−5	4
6	Casertana (3)	5	0	1	4	4	12	−8	1

=== Group 2 ===
Pos	Team	Pld	W	D	L	GF	GA	GD	Pts
1	Vicenza(2)	5	2	3	0	6	4	+2	7
2	Padova(3)	5	2	2	1	7	4	+3	6
3	Napoli(1)	5	2	2	1	5	2	+3	6
4	Lecce(1)	5	2	2	1	7	6	+1	6
5	Pescara(2)	5	0	3	2	5	7	−2	3
6	Salernitana(3)	5	0	2	3	3	10	−7	2

=== Group 3 ===
Pos	Team	Pld	W	D	L	GF	GA	GD	Pts
1	Atalanta(1)	5	2	3	0	9	5	+4	7
2	Sampdoria(1)	5	2	3	0	7	3	+4	7
3	Lazio(2)	5	2	3	0	5	2	+3	7
4	Monopoli(3)	5	2	0	3	3	6	−3	4
5	Taranto(3)	5	1	1	3	3	8	−5	3
6	Catania(2)	5	0	2	3	3	6	−3	2

=== Group 4 ===
Pos	Team	Pld	W	D	L	GF	GA	GD	Pts
1	Internazionale(1)	5	3	2	0	11	4	+7	8
2	Empoli(2)	5	1	3	1	9	5	+4	5
3	Avellino(1)	5	1	3	1	7	5	+2	5
4	Cesena(2)	5	1	3	1	3	4	−1	5
5	Brescia(2)	5	2	1	2	6	8	−2	5
6	Ancona(3)	5	1	0	4	5	15	−10	2

=== Group 5 ===
Pos	Team	Pld	W	D	L	GF	GA	GD	Pts
1	Pisa(1)	5	3	2	0	10	5	+5	8
2	Hellas Verona(1)	5	2	2	1	6	3	+3	6
3	Parma(3)	5	2	2	1	3	3	0	6
4	Bologna(2)	5	2	1	2	5	6	−1	5
5	Cremonese(2)	5	1	1	3	5	9	−4	3
6	Piacenza(3)	5	0	2	3	7	10	−3	2

=== Group 6 ===
Pos	Team	Pld	W	D	L	GF	GA	GD	Pts
1	Udinese(1)	5	5	0	0	12	2	+10	10
2	Milan(1)	5	3	1	1	7	4	+3	7
3	Reggiana(3)	5	1	2	2	3	6	−3	4
4	Genoa(2)	5	0	4	1	4	8	−4	4
5	Arezzo(2)	5	1	1	3	5	6	−1	3
6	Cagliari(2)	5	0	2	3	1	6	−5	2

=== Group 7 ===
Pos	Team	Pld	W	D	L	GF	GA	GD	Pts
1	Torino(1)	5	3	2	0	11	5	+6	8
2	Como(1)	5	3	1	1	7	6	+1	7
3	Triestina(2)	5	1	3	1	6	6	0	5
4	Varese(3)	5	1	2	2	5	6	−1	4
5	Sambenedettese(2)	5	1	1	3	5	7	−2	3
6	Rimini(3)	5	1	1	3	7	11	−4	3

=== Group 8 ===
Pos	Team	Pld	W	D	L	GF	GA	GD	Pts
1	Roma(1)	5	3	1	1	10	2	+8	7
2	Messina(2)	5	2	3	0	4	2	+2	7
3	Ascoli(2)	5	2	2	1	5	6	−1	6
4	Campobasso(2)	5	1	2	2	2	3	−1	4
5	Bari(1)	5	1	2	2	3	6	−3	4
6	Catanzaro(2)	5	0	2	3	3	8	−5	2

== Knockout stage ==
Round of 16
Udinese(1)	1	1	2
Fiorentina(1)	3	0	3
Milan(1)	0	1	1
Empoli(2)	1	1	2
Padova(3)	1	1	2
Internazionale(1)	2	2	4
Atalanta(1)	0	2	2
Roma(1)	2	1	3
Juventus(1)	0	1	1
Como(1)	1	1	2
Pisa Calcio(1)	0	2	2
Hellas Verona(1)	3	0	3
Messina(2)	0	0	0
Torino(1)	2	2	4
Vicenza(2)	0	2	2
Sampdoria(1)	3	2	5

Quarter-finals
Fiorentina(1)	2	3	5
Empoli(2)	3	0	3
Internazionale(1)	0	2	2
Roma(1)	2	1	3
Como(1)	1	3	4
Hellas Verona(1)	2	1	3
Torino(1)	0	3	3
Sampdoria(1)	2	4	6

Semi-finals
Fiorentina(1)	0	1	1
Roma(1)	2	1	3
Como(1)	1	0^{1}	1
Sampdoria(1)	1	2^{1}	3

Final
Roma(1)	1	2	3
Sampdoria(1)	2	0	2

^{1}Awarded to Sampdoria for fans troubles during extra times

== Final ==
=== First leg ===
7 June 1986
21:00

Sampdoria	2–1	Roma
Mancini 19'; Galia 67'		Tovalieri 45'

Stadio Luigi Ferraris, Genoa
Attendance: 25,000
Referee: Paolo Casarin

=== Second leg ===
14 June 1986
21:00

Roma	2–0	Sampdoria
Desideri 43' (pen.); Cerezo 89'

Stadio Olimpico, Rome
Attendance: 38,000
Referee: Tullio Lanese

Roma won 3–2 on aggregate.

== Top goalscorers ==
Rank	Player	Club	Goals
1	(Italy) Luca Cecconi	Empoli	9
2	(Italy) Sandro Tovalieri	Roma	8
3	(Italy) Giuseppe Galderisi	Hellas Verona	5
4	(Italy) Roberto Mancini	Sampdoria	4
4	(Italy) Giuseppe Lorenzo	Sampdoria	4
4	(Italy) Antonio Comi	Torino	4
4	(Austria) Walter Schachner	Torino	4
4	(Italy) Andrea Carnevale	Udinese	4
4	(Italy) Alessandro Altobelli	Internazionale	4
4	(Italy) Domenico Moro	Ancona	4
4	(Argentina) Daniel Passarella	Fiorentina	4
4	(Italy) Aldo Serena	Juventus	4
