= 1984 Coppa Italia final =

36th Coppa Italia final
- Event: 1983–84 Coppa Italia
Hellas Verona	Roma
1	2

First leg
Hellas Verona	Roma
1	1
- Date: 21 June 1984
- Venue: Stadio Marcantonio Bentegodi, Verona
- Referee: Paolo Casarin
- Attendance: 30,000

Second leg
Roma	Hellas Verona
1	0
- Date: 26 June 1984
- Venue: Stadio Olimpico, Rome
- Referee: Paolo Casarin
- Attendance: 45,101

The 1984 Coppa Italia final was the final of the 1983–84 Coppa Italia. The match was played over two legs on 21 and 26 June 1984 between Roma and Hellas Verona.
Roma won 2–1 on aggregate. It was Hellas Verona's third final and third defeat.

== First leg ==
21 June 1984
20:30

Hellas Verona	1–1	Roma
Storgato 72'		Cerezo 49'

Stadio Marcantonio Bentegodi, Verona
Attendance: 30,000
Referee: Paolo Casarin

Hellas Verona	Roma

GK	1	(Italy) Claudio Garella
RB	2	(Italy) Mauro Ferroni
CB	5	(Italy) Silvano Fontolan
CB	6	(Italy) Roberto Tricella (c)
LB	3	(Italy) Luciano Marangon
CM	4	(Italy) Domenico Volpati
CM	8	(Italy) Massimo Storgato
AM	10	(Italy) Antonio Di Gennaro
RW	7	(Italy) Luciano Bruni	(substituted off) 88'
CF	9	(Italy) Maurizio Iorio
LW	11	(Italy) Giuseppe Galderisi
Substitutes:
FW		(Scotland) Joe Jordan	(substituted in) 88'
Manager:
(Italy) Osvaldo Bagnoli

GK	1	(Italy) Franco Tancredi
RB	2	(Italy) Michele Nappi
CB	3	(Italy) Emidio Oddi
CB	4	(Italy) Sebastiano Nela
LB	6	(Italy) Aldo Maldera
DM	5	(Brazil) Paulo Roberto Falcão
CM	8	(Brazil) Toninho Cerezo
CM	10	(Italy) Agostino Di Bartolomei (c)
RW	11	(Italy) Francesco Graziani
CF	9	(Italy) Roberto Pruzzo	(substituted off) 88'
LW	7	(Italy) Bruno Conti
Substitutes:
FW		(Italy) Odoacre Chierico	(substituted in) 88'
Manager:
(Sweden) Nils Liedholm

== Second leg ==
26 June 1984
20:45

Roma	1–0	Hellas Verona
Ferroni 27' (o.g.)

Stadio Olimpico, Rome
Attendance: 45,101
Referee: Paolo Casarin

Roma	Hellas Verona

GK	1	(Italy) Franco Tancredi
RB	2	(Italy) Michele Nappi
CB	3	(Italy) Sebastiano Nela
CB	4	(Italy) Agostino Di Bartolomei (c)
LB	6	(Italy) Aldo Maldera
DM	5	(Brazil) Paulo Roberto Falcão
CM	8	(Brazil) Toninho Cerezo
CM	10	(Italy) Odoacre Chierico
RW	11	(Italy) Francesco Graziani
CF	9	(Italy) Roberto Pruzzo	(substituted off) 80'
LW	7	(Italy) Bruno Conti	(substituted off) 18'
Substitutes:
MF		(Italy) Mark Tullio Strukelj	(substituted in) 18'	(substituted off) 62'
MF		(Italy) Giuseppe Giannini	(substituted in) 62'
FW		(Italy) Francesco Vincenzi	(substituted in) 80'
Manager:
(Sweden) Nils Liedholm

GK	1	(Italy) Claudio Garella
RB	2	(Italy) Mauro Ferroni
CB	5	(Italy) Silvano Fontolan
CB	6	(Italy) Roberto Tricella (c)
LB	3	(Italy) Luciano Marangon	(substituted off) 54'
CM	4	(Italy) Domenico Volpati
CM	8	(Italy) Massimo Storgato	(substituted off) 83'
AM	10	(Italy) Antonio Di Gennaro
RW	7	(Italy) Pietro Fanna
CF	9	(Italy) Maurizio Iorio (red card)
LW	11	(Italy) Giuseppe Galderisi	(substituted off) 70'
Substitutes:
MF		(Italy) Luciano Bruni	(substituted in) 54'
FW		(Scotland) Joe Jordan	(substituted in) 70'
MF		(Italy) Mario Guidetti	(substituted in) 83'
Manager:
(Italy) Osvaldo Bagnoli

== See also ==
- 1983–84 AS Roma season
