= 1983–84 AS Roma season =

Roma
1983–84 season
- President: Dino Viola
- Manager: Nils Liedholm
- Stadium: Olimpico
- Serie A: 2nd
- Coppa Italia: Winners (in 1984-85 UEFA Cup Winners' Cup)
- European Cup: Runners- Up
- Top goalscorer: League: Pruzzo (8); All: Pruzzo (15)
Home colours	Away colours	Third colours

During the 1983–84 season Associazione Sportiva Roma competed in Serie A, Coppa Italia and European Cup.

== Summary ==
During the summer the club transferred in Brazilian midfielder Toninho Cerezo from Atletico Mineiro and forward Francesco Graziani from Fiorentina. Head coach Nils Liedholm changed the defensive style after the crucial centre–back Pietro Vierchowod's loan to Sampdoria ended. Another key player in midfielder Carlo Ancelotti was injured in early December during match against Juventus, thus missing the rest of the season. The squad finished second in the league behind champion Juventus.

Meanwhile, in the first round of the European Cup, the team defeated IFK Goteborg with an aggregate score of 4–2, after which the squad eliminated CSKA Sofia in the round of 16 and Dinamo Berlin in the quarter-finals. The semifinals pitted the Italians against Scottish outfit Dundee United. After losing the first leg 2–0, the Giallorossi won 3–0 in Roma, reaching the Final of the tournament for the first time in their history. The match against the three-time European Cup champion and heavy favourite Liverpool, though played in its home venue Stadio Olimpico, was won by the English squad after a penalty shoot-out, with the Roman squad being unable to field crucial players such as Maldera and Carlo Ancelotti.

Meanwhile, in June the squad won the Coppa Italia after defeating upcoming underdogs Hellas Verona:, which proved to be the last match for Swedish manager Nils Liedholm, who was appointed by Giuseppe Farina as the new head coach of AC Milan for the next season, including the departure of midfielder and captain Agostino Di Bartolomei.

== Squad ==
Note: Flags indicate national team as defined under FIFA eligibility rules; some limited exceptions apply. Players may hold more than one non-FIFA nationality.

Pos.	Nation	Player
GK	ITA	Attilio Gregori
GK	ITA	Astutillo Malgioglio
GK	ITA	Marco Savorani
GK	ITA	Franco Superchi
GK	ITA	Franco Tancredi
DF	ITA	Dario Bonetti
DF	ITA	Roberto Fois
DF	ITA	Settimio Lucci
DF	ITA	Aldo Maldera
DF	ITA	Sebastiano Nela
DF	ITA	Michele Nappi
DF	ITA	Emidio Oddi
DF	ITA	Paolo Petitti
DF	ITA	Ubaldo Righetti
DF	ITA	Viero Vignoli
MF	ITA	Carlo Ancelotti

Pos.	Nation	Player
MF	BRA	Toninho Cerezo
MF	ITA	Odoacre Chierico
MF	ITA	Bruno Conti
MF	ITA	Stefano Desideri
MF	ITA	Agostino Di Bartolomei (Captain)
MF	ITA	Fabrizio Di Mauro
MF	BRA	Paulo Roberto Falcão
MF	ITA	Giuseppe Giannini
MF	ITA	Stefano Impallomeni
MF	ITA	Stefano Nobili
MF	ITA	Mark Tullio Strukelj
FW	ITA	Corrado Baglieri
FW	ITA	Paolo Baldieri
FW	ITA	Francesco Graziani
FW	ITA	Roberto Pruzzo
FW	ITA	Francesco Vincenzi

=== Transfers ===
In
Pos.	Name	from	Type
MF	Toninho Cerezo	Atletico Mineiro	
FW	Francesco Graziani	Fiorentina	
GK	Astutillo Malgioglio	Pistoiese	
DF	Emidio Oddi	Hellas Verona	
FW	Francesco Vincenzi	Pistoiese	
MF	Mark Tullio Strukelj	Triestina	co-ownership
DF	Dario Bonetti	Sampdoria	loan ended
MF	Antonio Di Carlo	Carrarese	loan
FW	Guido Ugolotti	Pisa	loan ended

Out
Pos.	Name	To	Type
DF	Pietro Vierchowod	Sampdoria	loan ended
MF	Herbert Prohaska	Austria Wien	
DF	Massimo Gregori	Catania	
MF	Gianni Boccia		
MF	Antonio Di Carlo	Arezzo	loan
MF	Paolo Giovannelli	Pisa	
MF	Claudio Valigi	Perugia Calcio	
FW	Paolo Alberto Faccini	Sambenedettese	
FW	Maurizio Iorio	Hellas Verona	co-ownership
FW	Sandro Tovalieri	Pescara	loan
FW	Guido Ugolotti	Campobasso	

==== Winter ====
Out
Pos.	Name	To	Type
DF	Settimio Lucci	Avellino	loan

== Competitions ==
=== Serie A ===
==== League table ====
Pos	Team	Pld	W	D	L	GF	GA	GD	Pts	Qualification or relegation
1	Juventus (C)	30	17	9	4	57	29	+28	43	Qualification to European Cup
2	Roma	30	15	11	4	48	28	+20	41	Qualification to Cup Winners' Cup
3	Fiorentina	30	12	12	6	48	31	+17	36	Qualification to UEFA Cup
4	Internazionale	30	12	11	7	37	23	+14	35	Qualification to UEFA Cup
5	Torino	30	11	11	8	37	30	+7	33	

Source: RSSSF.com
Rules for classification: 1) Points; 2) Head-to-head points; 3) Head-to-head goal difference; 4) Goal difference; 5) Goals scored; 6) Draw. (Note: Head-to-head record is used only after all the matches between the teams in question have been played).
(C) Champions

==== Position by result ====
Round	1	2	3	4	5	6	7	8	9	10	11	12	13	14	15	16	17	18	19	20	21	22	23	24	25	26	27	28	29	30
Ground	H	A	H	A	H	A	H	A	H	A	A	H	A	H	A	A	H	A	H	A	H	A	H	A	H	H	A	H	A	H
Result	W	W	W	L	W	W	W	L	D	L	D	W	D	W	L	D	D	D	W	W	D	W	W	D	W	D	D	W	D	W
Position	1	1	1	2	2	1	1	1	1	3	2	2	2	2	3	3	3	4	3	2	2	2	2	2	2	2	2	2	2	2

Source: http://calcio-seriea.net/allenatori_squadra/1983/894/
A = Away; H = Home; W = Win; D = Draw; L = Loss; P = Postponed; = Leader, 1984–85 European Cup; = 1984–85 UEFA Cup

==== Matches ====
11 September 1983 1	Roma	2–0	Pisa	Rome
16:00	Di Bartolomei 40' (pen.); Conti 80'	Report		Stadium: Olimpico; Attendance: 50 000; Referee: Pietro D'Elia

18 September 1983 2	Sampdoria	1–2	Roma	Genoa
16:00	Guerrini 34'	Report	36' Nela; 63' Graziani	Stadium: Luigi Ferraris; Attendance: 43 0000; Referee: Luigi Agnolin

25 September 1983 3	Roma	3–1	Milan	Rome
15:00	Vincenzi 34'; Maldera 44'; Falcão 80'	Report	28' Battistini	Stadium: Olimpico; Attendance: circa 70.000; Referee: Mattei

2 October 1983 4	Torino	2–1	Roma	Turin
15:00	Hernández 7', 39'	Report	89' (o.g.) Zaccarelli	Stadium: Comunale; Attendance: circa 40.000; Referee: Redini

9 October 1983 5	Roma	1–0	Genoa	Rome
15:00	Conti 62'	Report		Stadium: Olimpico; Attendance: circa 70.000; Referee: Paparesta

23 October 1983 6	Lazio	0–2	Roma	Rome
15:00		Report	4' Nela; 63' Pruzzo	Stadium: Olimpico; Attendance: circa 65.000; Referee: Agnolin

30 October 1983 7	Roma	5–1	Napoli	Rome
14:30	Graziani 9'; Cerezo 20'; Falcão 33'; Conti 38', 80'	Report	70' Dal Fiume	Stadium: Olimpico; Attendance: circa 60.000; Referee: Bergamo

6 November 1983 8	Udinese	1–0	Roma	Udine
14:30	Zico 85'	Report		Stadium: Friuli; Attendance: circa 50.000; Referee: Pieri

20 November 1983 9	Roma	1–1	Ascoli	Rome
14:30	Pruzzo 60'	Report	72' Novellino	Stadium: Olimpico; Attendance: circa 48.000; Referee: Vitali

27 November 1983 10	Inter Milan	1–0	Roma	Milan
14:30	Beccalossi 8'	Report		Stadium: Giuseppe Meazza; Attendance: circa 60.000; Referee: Redini

4 December 1983 11	Juventus	2–2	Roma	Turin
14:30	Platini 72'; Penzo 77'	Report	62' Conti; 90' Pruzzo	Stadium: Comunale; Referee: Paolo Casarin

11 December 1983 12	Roma	3–2	Avellino	Rome
14:30	Falcão 24', 57'; Maldera 89'	Report	81' Biagini; 87' Díaz	Stadium: Olimpico; Referee: Lo Bello

18 December 1983 13	Fiorentina	0–0	Roma	Florence
14:30		Report		Stadium: Comunale; Attendance: circa 50,000; Referee: Agnolin

31 December 1983 14	Roma	1–0	Catania	Rome
14:30	Maldera 32'	Report		Stadium: Olimpico; Referee: Bergamo

8 January 1984 15	Hellas Verona	1–0	Roma	Verona
14:30	Di Gennaro 82'	Report		Stadium: Marcantonio Bentegodi; Referee: D'Elia

15 January 1984 16	Pisa Calcio	1–1	Roma	Pisa
	Bonetti 56' (o.g.)	Report	33' Strukelj	Stadium: Stadio Arena Garibaldi

22 January 1984 17	Roma	1–1	Sampdoria	Rome
14:30	Pruzzo 36'	Report	53' Mancini	Stadium: Olimpico; Referee: Lo Bello

29 January 1984 18	Milan	1–1	Roma	Milan
14:30	Verza 54'	Report	69' Pruzzo	Stadium: Stadio Giuseppe Meazza; Referee: Agnolin

12 February 1984 19	Roma	2–1	Torino	Rome
15:00	Maldera 28'; Pruzzo 83'	Report	31' Dossena	Stadium: Olimpico; Referee: Casarin

19 February 1984 20	Genoa	0–2	Roma	Genoa
15:00		Report	5', 82' Graziani	Stadium: Stadio Luigi Ferraris; Referee: Barbaresco

26 February 1984 21	Roma	2–2	Lazio	Rome
15:00	Di Bartolomei 40' (pen.); Cerezo 52'	Report	9', 25' (pen.) D'Amico	Stadium: Olimpico; Attendance: circa 63.000; Referee: Agnolin

11 March 1984 22	Napoli	1–2	Roma	Naples
15:00	Casale 59'	Report	15' Graziani; 62' Bonetti I	Stadium: Stadio San Paolo; Attendance: circa 60.000; Referee: Bergamo

18 March 1984 23	Roma	4–1	Udinese	Rome
15:00	Falcão 31'; Cerezo 68'; Conti 73'; Di Bartolomei 87'	Report	20' Edinho	Stadium: Olimpico; Attendance: circa 49.000; Referee: Mattei

25 March 1984 24	Ascoli	0–0	Roma	Ascoli Piceno
15:30		Report		Stadium: Stadio Cino e Lillo Del Duca; Referee: Redini

1 April 1984 25	Roma	1–0	Inter Milan	Rome
15:30	Di Bartolomei 24' (pen.)	Report		Stadium: Olimpico; Referee: D'Elia

15 April 1984 26	Roma	0–0	Juventus	Rome
15:30		Report		Stadium: Olimpico; Referee: Casarin

21 April 1984 27	Avellino	2–2	Roma	Avellino
15:30	Díaz 64'; Tagliaferri 90'	Report	24' Pruzzo; 51' Cerezo	Stadium: Stadio Partenio; Attendance: circa 30.000; Referee: Bergamo

29 April 1984 28	Roma	2–1	Fiorentina	Rome
16:00	Pruzzo 15'; Conti 40'	Report	60' Monelli	Stadium: Olimpico; Attendance: 36,000; Referee: Egidio Ballerini

6 May 1984 29	Catania	2–2	Roma	Palermo
16:00	Carnevale 55'; Torrisi 83' (pen.)	Report	23' Maldera III; 29' Chierico	Stadium: La Favorita; Attendance: 20,000; Referee: Arcangelo Pezzella

13 May 1984 30	Roma	3–2	Hellas Verona	Rome
16:00	Cerezo 28', 50'; Di Bartolomei 46' (pen.)	Report	1' Storgato; 41' Iorio	Stadium: Olimpico; Referee: Giancarlo Redini

=== Coppa Italia ===
==== First round - Group 5 ====
Pos	Team	Pld	W	D	L	GF	GA	GD	Pts
1	Roma	5	4	1	0	11	4	+7	9
2	Milan	5	3	2	0	8	2	+6	8
3	Rimini	5	2	1	2	8	8	0	5
4	Atalanta	5	1	2	2	5	7	−2	4
5	Arezzo	5	0	3	2	2	5	−3	3
6	Padova	5	0	1	4	3	11	−8	1

Source: https://www.rsssf.org/tablesi/italcup84.html

21 August 1983 1	Rimini	1–3	Roma	Rimini
21:00	Cinquetti 68'		54', 63' Vincenzi; 75' Pruzzo	Stadium: Romeo Neri; Referee: Pierluigi Pairetto

24 August 1983 2	Arezzo	0–1	Roma	Arezzo
20:30		Report	52' Vincenzi	Stadium: Comunale; Attendance: 12 000; Referee: Maurizio Mattei

28 August 1983 3	Roma	2–0	Atalanta B.C.	Rome
20:30	Pruzzo 24' (pen.); Strukelj 70'			Stadium: Olimpico; Referee: Egidio Ballerini

31 August 1983 4	Roma	4–2	Calcio Padova	Rome
20:45	Cerezo 18', 70'; Graziani 31'; Maldera 42'	Report	14' Coppola; 66' Graziani	Stadium: Olimpico; Attendance: 20 000; Referee: Tullio Lanese

4 September 1983 5	AC Milan	1–1	Roma	Milan
20:30	Battistini 32'		22' Vincenzi	Stadium: San Siro; Referee: Gino Menicucci

==== Round of 16 ====
8 February 1984 First leg	Roma	2–0	A.C. Reggiana	Rome
15:00	Vincenzi 45'; Graziani 81'	Report		Stadium: Olimpico; Attendance: 10 000; Referee: Salvatore Lombardo

22 February 1984 Second leg	A.C. Reggiana	0–1 (0–3 agg.)	Roma	Reggio Emilia
20:30		Report	37' Cerezo	Stadium: Mirabello; Attendance: 7 000; Referee: Liberato Esposito

==== Quarter-finals ====
7 June 1984 First leg	Roma	1–1	AC Milan	Rome
20:45	Di Bartolomei 56' (pen.)	Report	48' (o.g.) Nappi	Stadium: Olimpico; Attendance: 70 000; Referee: Rosario Lo Bello

10 June 1984 Second leg	AC Milan	1–2 (a.e.t.) (2–3 agg.)	Roma	Milan
20:30	Carotti 33'	Report	2', 94' Cerezo	Stadium: San Siro; Attendance: 57 259; Referee: Giancarlo Redini

==== Semi-finals ====
13 June 1984 First leg	Torino	1–3	Roma	Turin
20:30	Selvaggi 60'	Report	6' Conti; 50', 80' Strukelj	Stadium: Comunale; Attendance: 30 000; Referee: Paolo Bergamo

16 June 1984 Second leg	Roma	1–0 (4–1 agg.)	Torino	Rome
20:45	Conti 81'	Report		Stadium: Olimpico; Attendance: 29 136; Referee: Rosario Lo Bello

==== Final ====
21 June 1984 First leg	Hellas Verona	1–1	Roma	Verona
20:30	Storgato 73'	Report	48' Cerezo	Stadium: Marcantonio Bentegodi; Referee: Paolo Casarin

26 June 1984 Second leg	Roma	1–0 (2–1 agg.)	Hellas Verona	Rome
20:45	Ferroni 27' (o.g.)	Report		Stadium: Olimpico; Attendance: 45 101; Referee: Paolo Casarin

=== European Cup ===
==== First round ====
14 September 1983 First leg	Roma (Italy)	3–0	(Sweden) IFK Goteborg	Rome
20:30 CET	Vincenzi 51'; Conti 62'; Cerezo 70'	Report		Stadium: Olimpico; Referee: (Bulgaria) Docev

28 September 1983 Second leg	IFK Goteborg (Sweden)	2–1 (4–2 agg.)	(Italy) Roma	Gothenburg
	Gardner 1'; Holmgren 73'	Report	60' Pruzzo	Stadium: Ullevi; Referee: (Belgium) Van Langenhove

==== Second round ====
19 October 1983 First leg	CSKA Sofia (Bulgaria)	0–1	(Italy) Roma	Sofia
18:00 CET		Report	63' Falcão	Stadium: Vasil Levski National; Referee: (France) Vautrot

2 November 1983 Second leg	Roma (Italy)	1–0 (2–0 agg.)	(Bulgaria) CSKA Sofia	Rome
17:30 CET	Graziani 80'	Report		Stadium: Olimpico; Attendance: 56 961; Referee: (Czech Republic) Daina

==== Quarter-finals ====
7 March 1984 First leg	Roma (Italy)	3–0	(East Germany) Dinamo Berlin	Rome
15:00 CET	Graziani 67'; Pruzzo 75'; Cerezo 90'	Report		Stadium: Olimpico; Attendance: 65 000; Referee: (Netherlands) Keizer

21 March 1984 Second leg	Dinamo Berlin (East Germany)	2–1 (2–4 agg.)	(Italy) Roma	East Berlin
20:00 CET	Thom 76'; Ernst 86'	Report	56' Oddi	Stadium: Friedrich-Ludwig-Jahn-Sportpark; Referee: (Sweden) Johansson

==== Semi-finals ====
11 April 1984 First leg	Dundee United (Scotland)	2–0	(Italy) Roma	Dundee
20:30 CET	Dodds 48'; Stark 60'	Report		Stadium: Tannadice Park; Referee: (East Germany) Kirschen

25 April 1984 Second leg	Roma (Italy)	3–0 (3–2 agg.)	(Scotland) Dundee United	Rome
15:30 CET	Pruzzo 23'; Pruzzo 38'; Di Bartolomei 58' (pen.)	Report		Stadium: Olimpico; Attendance: 73 000; Referee: (France) Vautrot

==== Final ====
30 May 1984	Liverpool (England)	1–1 (a.e.t.) (4–2 p)	(Italy) Roma	Rome
20:15 CET	Neal 14'	Report	43' Pruzzo	Stadium: Olimpico; Attendance: 69 693; Referee: (Sweden) Fredriksson
	Penalties
	Nicol (penalty missed); Neal (penalty scored); Souness (penalty scored); Rush (penalty scored); Kennedy (penalty scored)		(penalty scored) Di Bartolomei; (penalty missed) Conti; (penalty scored) Righetti; (penalty missed) Graziani

== Statistics ==
=== Squad statistics ===
Competition	Points	Home						Away						Total						GD
Competition	Points	G	W	D	L	Gs	Ga	G	W	D	L	Gs	Ga	G	W	D	L	Gs	Ga	GD
Serie A	41	15	11	4	0	31	13	15	4	7	4	17	15	30	15	11	4	48	28	+20
Coppa Italia		6	5	1	0	11	3	7	5	2	0	12	5	13	10	3	0	23	8	+15
European Cup		4	4	0	0	10	0	5	1	1	3	4	7	9	5	1	3	14	7	+7
Totals		25	20	5	0	52	16	27	10	10	7	33	27	52	30	15	7	85	43	+42

=== Player statistics ===
No.	Pos	Nat	Player	Total		Serie A		Coppa Italia		European Cup	
No.	Pos	Nat	Player	Apps	Goals	Apps	Goals	Apps	Goals	Apps	Goals
	GK	(Italy) ITA	Tancredi	50	-40	30	-26	11	-7	9	-7
	DF	(Italy) ITA	Maldera	43	6	25	5	11	1	7	0
	DF	(Italy) ITA	Nela	41	2	27	2	7	0	7	0
	DF	(Italy) ITA	Oddi	36	1	16+2	0	11	0	7	1
	DF	(Italy) ITA	Righetti	36	0	20+1	0	6	0	9	0
	MF	(Brazil) BRA	Cerezo	50	14	30	6	11	6	9	2
	MF	(Italy) ITA	Conti	43	10	27	7	7	2	9	1
	MF	(Italy) ITA	Di Bartolomei	48	7	28	5	12	1	8	1
	MF	(Brazil) BRA	Falcao	43	6	27	5	8	0	8	1
	FW	(Italy) ITA	Graziani	43	9	22+2	5	10	2	9	2
	FW	(Italy) ITA	Pruzzo	43	15	27	8	9	2	7	5
	GK	(Italy) ITA	Malgioglio	4	-3	0+1	-2	3	-1	0	0
	DF	(Italy) ITA	Bonetti	22	1	12+1	1	4	0	5	0
	DF	(Italy) ITA	Nappi	23	0	10+1	0	10	0	2	0
	MF	(Italy) ITA	Ancelotti	18	0	9	0	5	0	4	0
	MF	(Italy) ITA	Chierico	33	1	8+9	1	9	0	7	0
	MF	(England) ENG	Strukelj	20	4	6+5	1	8	3	1	0
	FW	(Italy) ITA	Vincenzi	23	7	6+5	1	10	5	2	1
	MF	(Italy) ITA	Giannini	5	0	0+2	0	3	0	0	0
	DF	(Italy) ITA	Petitti	1	0	0	0	1	0	0	0
	MF	(Italy) ITA	Impallomeni	1	0	0	0	1	0	0	0
	MF	(Italy) ITA	Baglieri	1	0	0	0	1	0	0	0
	MF	(Italy) ITA	Baldieri	2	0	0+1	0	1	0	0	0
	GK	(Italy) ITA	Savorani	0	0	0	0	0	0	0	0
	GK	(Italy) ITA	Superchi	0	0	0	0	0	0	0	0
	DF	(Italy) ITA	Fois	0	0	0	0	0	0	0	0
	DF	(Italy) ITA	Lucci	0	0	0	0	0	0	0	0
	DF	(Italy) ITA	Vignoli	0	0	0	0	0	0	0	0
	MF	(Italy) ITA	Desideri	0	0	0	0	0	0	0	0
	MF	(Italy) ITA	Di Mauro	0	0	0	0	0	0	0	0
	MF	(Italy) ITA	Nobili	0	0	0	0	0	0	0	0

- Source: http://calcio-seriea.net/presenze/1983/894/

== See also ==
- "Sito ufficiale".
- "Serie A 1983-1984 su Rsssf.com".
