= 1983–84 Liverpool F.C. season =

English football club season

Liverpool F.C.
1983–84 season
- Chairman: John W Smith
- Manager: Joe Fagan
- First Division: Champions
- FA Cup: Fourth round
- League Cup: Winners
- FA Charity Shield: Runners-up
- European Cup: Winners
- Top goalscorer: League: Ian Rush (32); All: Ian Rush (47)
Home colours	Away colours

The 1983–84 season was Liverpool Football Club's 92nd season in existence and their 22nd consecutive season in the First Division. It was Liverpool's first season under the management of Joe Fagan, who was promoted from the coaching staff after the retirement of Bob Paisley, their manager of the last nine seasons who had won at least one major trophy in all but the first of his seasons as manager (including six league titles and three European Cups). Fagan's first season as manager ended with Liverpool becoming the first team in England to win three major trophies in the same season as they won the league title, European Cup and League Cup. They beat AS Roma on penalties to win the European Cup for the fourth time (their sixth European trophy win overall), and defeated Merseyside rivals Everton in the League Cup final replay, and fought off a challenge from the likes of Southampton, Nottingham Forest, Manchester United and Queens Park Rangers to win their 15th league title, and their third consecutive title.

The undoubted star of the season was striker Ian Rush, who scored 32 goals in the league and 47 in all competitions.

It was the last season at the club for midfielder Graeme Souness, who was sold to Italian side Sampdoria at the end of the campaign.

This team is regarded as one of Liverpool's greatest teams of all time and is considered as one of the greatest teams in football history.

== Events of the season ==
August Bob Paisley, the most successful manager in English football, retired as Liverpool's manager at the end of the 1982–83 season after nine glorious years at the helm. His successor was 62-year-old "boot room" veteran Joe Fagan.

The Fagan era began with the FA Charity Shield at Wembley Stadium on 20 August 1983. Liverpool, defending league champions, lost 2–0 in front of a 92,000 crowd, with Bryan Robson scoring both of the goals for FA Cup winners Manchester United. The league campaign began unspectacularly seven days later with a 1–1 draw at newly promoted Wolverhampton Wanderers.

September Liverpool's bid for a fourth European Cup triumph began on 14 September with a 1–0 away win in the first round first leg over Danish champions Odense. Qualification for the next stage was confirmed two weeks later when the Reds won 5–0 in the return leg at Anfield.

They had a decent month in the league as well, finishing the month in fourth place behind West Ham United, Manchester United and Southampton.

October October saw Liverpool's League Cup quest begin in the second round, where they eliminated Third Division Brentford by a comfortable margin. Their European Cup campaign thrown into question with a goalless home draw with Athletic Bilbao of Spain in the second round first leg, leaving them to need at least a score draw in the return leg in order to progress to the quarter-finals. In the league, however, excellent wins over West Ham United and Luton Town helped them to attain second place as the month drew to a close, two points short of leaders Manchester United. As well as the surprise challenge from West Ham United, they also had a race for the title mounting from fellow London side QPR, who like West Ham had never won the title before, but were also playing their first top division season since promotion the previous campaign.

November November was a rocky month for the Reds. They did manage to dispose of Atletico Bilbao in the European Cup, but were held to two draws by Fulham in the League Cup third round, finally winning the second replay. They did, however, climb to the top of the First Division, though the challenge from West Ham United and Manchester United remained intense, while a surprise challenge was springing from Tottenham Hostpur and unfashionable Luton Town – the latter who had been on the receiving end of a 6–0 demolition (and five goals by Ian Rush) by the Reds a month earlier.

December 10 December 1983 brought one of the most embarrassing defeats ever inflicted on Liverpool Football Club. They travelled to Highfield Road for a First Division clash with a Coventry City side who were emerging as surprise title challengers under young manager Bobby Gould, and found themselves on the receiving end of a 4–0 defeat. However, they pulled together the following weekend to demolish Notts County 5–0 at Anfield, and entered 1984 still in pole position and three points ahead of their nearest rivals Manchester United.

The League Cup quest continued with a replay win over Birmingham City in the fourth round.

January The first Liverpool game of 1984 was a 1–1 home draw with Manchester United in the league, billed by many as a championship decider – the outcome of which left the top two unchanged. The FA Cup quest began with a 4–0 home win over a Newcastle United led by former Liverpool striker Kevin Keegan, but ended later in the month with a shock 2–0 defeat at the hands of the previous season's losing finalists Brighton & Hove Albion. They also achieved a League Cup quarter-final replay win over Sheffield Wednesday, like Keegan's Newcastle on the way to promotion to the First Division. There was a real chance of a treble this season.

February Liverpool maintained top place in the First Division throughout February. In the League Cup semi-finals, they were held to a surprise 2–2 draw by Third Division minnows Walsall in the first leg at Anfield before winning the return leg 2–0 at Fellows Park, to secure a place in the League Cup final a month later against Merseyside rivals Everton, who were on a run in the cup competitions despite dismal league form which had seen repeated calls from fans for manager Howard Kendall to be sacked.

March March saw Liverpool seal their first trophy of the season when they won 1–0 in the final replay at Maine Road on 28 March 1984, three days after the first game saw them draw 0–0 with Everton at Wembley Stadium. The European adventure resumed with an excellent 5-1 aggregate win over Portuguese champions Benfica. They were still going strong in the league as well, and by the end of March only Manchester United (two points behind them) were looking able to catch them.

April A succession of wins could have wrapped up Liverpool's 15th league title before the end of April, but a shock defeat to relegation threatened Stoke City and a 3–3 draw with Leicester City meant that April ended with Liverpool still just two points ahead of Manchester United with four games remaining. And a late surge from QPR and Southampton suggested that the title might not end up at Anfield or Old Trafford.

Liverpool reached their fourth European Cup final by eliminating Dinamo Bucharest in the semi-finals.

May May 1984 was one of the most glorious months ever experienced by Liverpool Football Club, but it began with a result that suggested the month could turn out to be one of the most disappointing. A goalless draw at relegation threatened Birmingham City (who soon went down thanks to a late escape act by Stoke City) could have been enough for Liverpool to lose their lead to Manchester United on goal difference, but Ron Atkinson's side also managed only a draw that weekend, and there was still a mathematical chance of either QPR or Southampton winning the title.

Two days after the scare in the midlands, another midland side – Coventry City – took on Liverpool, this time at Anfield. Any talk of a repeat of the December humiliation at Highfield Road was quickly silenced as the Reds crushed the Sky Blues 5-0 (with Ian Rush scoring four goals and pushing them to the edge of the relegation zone just five months after they had been pushing for the title) and opened up a five-point lead to a Manchester United side who were beaten by Nottingham Forest on the same day. Southampton were now the only side other than Manchester United who could catch Liverpool, but the Reds only needed two points from their final two games to be sure of the title.

Liverpool drew their penultimate league game of the season with doomed Notts County at Meadow Lane, but Manchester United and Southampton were only able to draw their games as well – meaning that Liverpool had become only the third English club to win three successive league titles.

The championship trophy was presented to the club on 15 May 1984 after the final league game of the season – a 1–1 draw with Norwich City at Anfield.

The European Cup final was played on 30 May 1984. Veteran defender Phil Neal put the Reds ahead against AS Roma at the Stadio Olimpico in Rome, but the Italians later equalised to force a 1–1 draw which remained the score as full-time and then extra time loomed. The match went to a penalty shoot-out, which the Reds won 4–2, becoming the first English club to win three major trophies in the same season. It was their fourth European Cup triumph – a record only bettered by Real Madrid who won it six times between 1956 and 1966.

== Squad ==
=== Goalkeepers ===
- (England) Bob Bolder
- (Zimbabwe) Bruce Grobbelaar

=== Defenders ===
- (Republic of Ireland) Jim Beglin
- (Scotland) Gary Gillespie
- (Scotland) Alan Hansen
- (England) Alan Kennedy
- (Republic of Ireland) Mark Lawrenson
- (Scotland) John McGregor
- (England) Phil Neal
- (Scotland) Steve Nicol
- (England) Phil Thompson

=== Midfielders ===
- (Australia) Craig Johnston
- (England) Sammy Lee
- (Scotland) Graeme Souness
- (Scotland) John Wark
- (Republic of Ireland) Ronnie Whelan

=== Attackers ===
- (Scotland) Kenny Dalglish
- (England) David Hodgson
- (England) Michael Robinson
- (Wales) Ian Rush

== Squad statistics ==
=== Appearances and goals ===
No.	Pos	Nat	Player	Total		Division 1		FA Cup		Charity Shield		League Cup		European Cup	
No.	Pos	Nat	Player	Apps	Goals	Apps	Goals	Apps	Goals	Apps	Goals	Apps	Goals	Apps	Goals
	FW	(Scotland) SCO	Kenny Dalglish	51	12	33+0	7	0+0	0	1+0	0	8+0	2	8+1	3
	DF	(Scotland) SCO	Gary Gillespie	1	0	0+0	0	0+0	0	0+0	0	1+0	0	0+0	0
	GK	(Zimbabwe) ZIM	Bruce Grobbelaar	67	0	42+0	0	2+0	0	1+0	0	13+0	0	9+0	0
	DF	(Scotland) SCO	Alan Hansen	67	1	42+0	1	2+0	0	1+0	0	13+0	0	9+0	0
	FW	(England) ENG	David Hodgson	12	1	1+4	0	0+0	0	0+1	0	2+2	1	0+2	0
	MF	(Australia) AUS	Craig Johnston	52	4	28+1	2	2+0	1	0+1	0	11+1	0	7+1	1
	DF	(England) ENG	Alan Kennedy	67	2	42+0	2	2+0	0	1+0	0	13+0	0	9+0	0
	DF	(England) ENG	Mark Lawrenson	66	0	42+0	0	2+0	0	1+0	0	12+0	0	9+0	0
	MF	(England) ENG	Sammy Lee	67	3	42+0	2	2+0	0	1+0	0	13+0	0	9+0	1
	DF	(England) ENG	Phil Neal	64	3	41+0	1	2+0	0	1+0	0	12+0	1	8+0	1
	MF	(Scotland) SCO	Steve Nicol	38	7	19+4	5	2+0	0	0+0	0	9+0	2	2+2	0
	FW	(Republic of Ireland) IRL	Michael Robinson	42	12	23+1	6	2+0	1	1+0	0	8+1	3	5+1	2
	FW	(Wales) WAL	Ian Rush	65	47	41+0	32	2+0	2	1+0	0	12+0	8	9+0	5
	MF	(Scotland) SCO	Graeme Souness	61	12	37+0	7	2+0	0	1+0	0	12+0	5	9+0	0
	DF	(England) ENG	Phil Thompson	1	0	0+0	0	0+0	0	1+0	0	0+0	0	0+0	0
	MF	(Scotland) SCO	John Wark	9	2	9+0	2	0+0	0	0+0	0	0+0	0	0+0	0
	MF	(Republic of Ireland) IRL	Ronnie Whelan	34	9	20+3	4	0+1	0	0+0	0	4+1	3	5+0	2

== League table ==
Pos	Team	Pld	W	D	L	GF	GA	GD	Pts	Qualification or relegation
1	Liverpool (C)	42	22	14	6	73	32	+41	80	Qualification for the European Cup first round
2	Southampton	42	22	11	9	66	38	+28	77	Qualification for the UEFA Cup first round
3	Nottingham Forest	42	22	8	12	76	45	+31	74	Qualification for the UEFA Cup first round
4	Manchester United	42	20	14	8	71	41	+30	74	Qualification for the UEFA Cup first round
5	Queens Park Rangers	42	22	7	13	67	37	+30	73	Qualification for the UEFA Cup first round

Source: World Football
Rules for classification: 1) Points; 2) Goal difference; 3) Goals scored
(C) Champions

== Results ==
=== First Division ===
Date	Opponents	Venue	Result	Scorers	Attendance	Report 1	Report 2
27-Aug-83	Wolverhampton Wanderers	A	1–1	Rush 46'	26,249	Report	Report
31-Aug-83	Norwich City	A	1–0	Souness 29'	23,859	Report	Report
03-Sep-83	Nottingham Forest	H	1–0	Rush 84'	31,376	Report	Report
06-Sep-83	Southampton	H	1–1	Rush 60'	26,331	Report	Report
10-Sep-83	Arsenal	A	2–0	Johnston 17' Dalglish 67'	47,896	Report	Report
17-Sep-83	Aston Villa	H	2–1	Dalglish 73' Rush 79'	34,246	Report	Report
24-Sep-83	Manchester United	A	0–1		56,121	Report	Report
01-Oct-83	Sunderland	H	0–1		29,534	Report	Report
15-Oct-83	West Ham United	A	3–1	Robinson 15', 24', 74'	32,555	Report	Report
22-Oct-83	Queens Park Rangers	A	1–0	Nicol 83'	27,140	Report	Report
29-Oct-83	Luton Town	H	6–0	Rush 2', 5', 36', 55', 88' Dalglish 38'	31,940	Report	Report
06-Nov-83	Everton	H	3–0	Rush 16' Robinson 60' Nicol 85'	40,875	Report	Report
12-Nov-83	Tottenham Hotspur	A	2–2	Robinson 6' Rush 65'	45,032	Report	Report
19-Nov-83	Stoke City	H	1–0	Rush 67'	26,529	Report	Report
26-Nov-83	Ipswich Town	A	1–1	Dalglish 62'	23,826	Report	Report
03-Dec-83	Birmingham City	H	1–0	Rush 86'	24,791	Report	Report
10-Dec-83	Coventry City	A	0–4		20,586	Report	Report
17-Dec-83	Notts County	H	5–0	Nicol 12' Souness (pen 22), 83' Own goal 35' Rush 50'	22,436	Report	Report
26-Dec-83	West Bromwich Albion	A	2–1	Nicol 16' Souness 62'	25,139	Report	Report
27-Dec-83	Leicester City	H	2–2	Lee 74' Rush 83'	33,664	Report	Report
31-Dec-83	Nottingham Forest	A	1–0	Rush 28'	29,692	Report	Report
02-Jan-84	Manchester United	H	1–1	Johnston 32'	45,122	Report	Report
14-Jan-84	Wolverhampton Wanderers	H	0–1		23,325	Report	Report
20-Jan-84	Aston Villa	A	3–1	Rush 46', 70', 80'	19,566	Report	Report
01-Feb-84	Watford	H	3–0	Rush 10' Nicol 41' Whelan 45'	20,746	Report	Report
04-Feb-84	Sunderland	A	0–0		25,646	Report	Report
11-Feb-84	Arsenal	H	2–1	Kennedy 12' Neal 78'	34,642	Report	Report
18-Feb-84	Luton Town	A	0–0		14,877	Report	Report
25-Feb-84	Queens Park Rangers	H	2–0	Rush 80' Robinson 55'	32,206	Report	Report
03-Mar-84	Everton	A	1–1	Rush 17'	51,245	Report	Report
10-Mar-84	Tottenham Hotspur	H	3–1	Dalglish 41' Whelan 43' Lee 88'	36,718	Report	Report
16-Mar-84	Southampton	A	0–2		19,698	Report	Report
31-Mar-84	Watford	A	2–0	Wark 58' Rush 80'	21,293	Report	Report
07-Apr-84	West Ham United	H	6–0	Rush 6', 18' Dalglish 12' Whelan 28' Souness 62', 70'	38,359	Report	Report
14-Apr-84	Stoke City	A	0–2		24,372	Report	Report
18-Apr-84	Leicester City	A	3–3	Whelan 14' Rush 59' Wark 81'	26,553	Report	Report
21-Apr-84	West Bromwich Albion	H	3–0	Own goal 20' Souness 25' Dalglish 29'	35,320	Report	Report
28-Apr-84	Ipswich Town	H	2–2	Kennedy 31' Rush 37'	32,069	Report	Report
05-May-84	Birmingham City	A	0–0		18,809	Report	Report
07-May-84	Coventry City	H	5–0	Rush 43', 45', 57' (pen.), 81' Hansen 71'	33,393	Report	Report
12-May-84	Notts County	A	0–0		18,745	Report	Report
15-May-84	Norwich City	H	1–1	Rush 30'	38,837	Report	Report

=== FA Charity Shield ===
20 August 1983
15:00 UTC+1

Manchester United	2–0	Liverpool
Robson 23', 60'	Report; Report

Wembley Stadium, London
Attendance: 92,000

Manchester United	Liverpool

GK	1	(England) Gary Bailey
DF	2	(England) Mike Duxbury
DF	3	(Scotland) Arthur Albiston
MF	4	(England) Ray Wilkins
DF	5	(Republic of Ireland) Kevin Moran
DF	6	(Scotland) Gordon McQueen
MF	7	(England) Bryan Robson (c)
MF	8	(Netherlands) Arnold Mühren	Substituted off
FW	9	(Republic of Ireland) Frank Stapleton
FW	10	(Northern Ireland) Norman Whiteside
MF	11	(Scotland) Arthur Graham
Substitutes:
DF	12	(England) John Gidman	Substituted on
MF	13	(Scotland) Lou Macari
GK	14	(England) Jeff Wealands
MF	15	(England) Remi Moses
Manager:
(England) Ron Atkinson

GK	1	(Zimbabwe) Bruce Grobbelaar
RB	2	(England) Phil Neal
LB	3	(England) Alan Kennedy (c)
CM	4	(Republic of Ireland) Mark Lawrenson
CB	5	(England) Phil Thompson	(substituted off) 61'
CB	6	(Scotland) Alan Hansen
CF	7	(Scotland) Kenny Dalglish
RM	8	(England) Sammy Lee
CF	9	(Wales) Ian Rush
LM	10	(Republic of Ireland) Michael Robinson	(substituted off) 61'
CM	11	(Scotland) Graeme Souness
Substitutes:
MF	12	(Australia) Craig Johnston	(substituted on) 61'
FW	13	(England) David Hodgson	(substituted on) 61'
GK	14	(England) Bob Bolder
Manager:
(England) Joe Fagan

Match rules

- 90 minutes, no extra time
- Four named substitutes
- Maximum of two substitutions

=== FA Cup ===
Date	Opponents	Venue	Result	Scorers	Attendance	Report 1	Report 2
06-Jan-84	Newcastle United	H	4–0	Robinson 8' Rush 28', 86' Johnston 63'	33,566	Report	Report
29-Jan-84	Brighton & Hove Albion	A	0–2		19,057	Report	Report

=== League Cup ===
Date	Opponents	Venue	Result	Scorers	Attendance	Report 1	Report 2
05-Oct-83	Brentford	A	4–1	Rush 23', 70' Robinson 51' Souness 57'	17,859	Report	Report
25-Oct-83	Brentford	H	4–0	Souness (pen 38) Hodgson 65' Dalglish 69' Robinson 87'	9,902	Report	Report
08-Nov-83	Fulham	A	1–1	Rush 64'	20,142	Report	Report
22-Nov-83	Fulham	H	1–1	Dalglish 50'	15,783	Report	Report
29-Nov-83	Fulham	A	1–0	Souness 114'	20,905	Report	Report
20-Dec-83	Birmingham City	A	1–1	Souness 26'	17,405	Report	Report
22-Dec-83	Birmingham City	H	3–0	Nicol 39' Rush 53' (pen 74)	11,638	Report	Report
17-Jan-84	Sheffield Wednesday	A	2–2	Nicol 20' Neal (pen 60)	49,357	Report	Report
25-Jan-84	Sheffield Wednesday	H	3–0	Rush 37', 85' Robinson 74'	40,485	Report	Report
07-Feb-84	Walsall	H	2–2	Whelan 14', 73'	31,073	Report	Report
14-Feb-84	Walsall	A	2–0	Rush 13' Whelan 52'	19,591	Report	Report

Final

25 March 1984
15:00

Liverpool	0–0 (a.e.t)	Everton
	Report; Report

Wembley Stadium, London
Attendance: 100,000
Referee: Alan Robinson

Liverpool	Everton

GK	1	(Zimbabwe) Bruce Grobbelaar
RB	2	(England) Phil Neal
LB	3	(England) Alan Kennedy
CB	4	(Republic of Ireland) Mark Lawrenson
LM	5	(Republic of Ireland) Ronnie Whelan
CB	6	(Scotland) Alan Hansen
CF	7	(Scotland) Kenny Dalglish
RM	8	(England) Sammy Lee
CF	9	(Wales) Ian Rush
CM	10	(Australia) Craig Johnston	(substituted off) 91'
CM	11	(Scotland) Graeme Souness (c)
Substitute:
FW	12	(Republic of Ireland) Michael Robinson	(substituted on) 91'
Manager:
(England) Joe Fagan

GK	1	(Wales) Neville Southall
DF	2	(England) Gary Stevens
DF	3	(England) John Bailey
DF	4	(Wales) Kevin Ratcliffe (c)
DF	5	(England) Derek Mountfield
MF	6	(England) Peter Reid
MF	7	(Scotland) Alan Irvine
FW	8	(England) Adrian Heath
FW	9	(Scotland) Graeme Sharp
FW	10	(England) Kevin Richardson
MF	11	(Republic of Ireland) Kevin Sheedy
Substitute:
DF	12	(England) Alan Harper
Manager:
(England) Howard Kendall

Match rules

- 90 minutes.
- 30 minutes of extra-time if necessary.
- Replay if scores still level.
- One named substitute.
- Maximum of one substitution.

Replay

28 March 1984
19:30

Liverpool	1–0	Everton
Souness 21'	Report; Report

Maine Road, Manchester
Attendance: 52,089
Referee: Alan Robinson

Liverpool	Everton

GK	1	(Zimbabwe) Bruce Grobbelaar
RB	2	(England) Phil Neal
LB	3	(England) Alan Kennedy
CB	4	(Republic of Ireland) Mark Lawrenson
LM	5	(Republic of Ireland) Ronnie Whelan
CB	6	(Scotland) Alan Hansen
CF	7	(Scotland) Kenny Dalglish
RM	8	(England) Sammy Lee
CF	9	(Wales) Ian Rush
CM	10	(Australia) Craig Johnston
CM	11	(Scotland) Graeme Souness (c)
Substitute:
FW	12	(Republic of Ireland) Michael Robinson
Manager:
(England) Joe Fagan

GK	1	(Wales) Neville Southall
DF	2	(England) Gary Stevens
DF	3	(England) John Bailey
DF	4	(Wales) Kevin Ratcliffe (c)
DF	5	(England) Derek Mountfield
MF	6	(England) Peter Reid
MF	7	(Scotland) Alan Irvine (substituted off)
FW	8	(England) Adrian Heath
FW	9	(Scotland) Graeme Sharp
FW	10	(England) Kevin Richardson
MF	11	(England) Alan Harper
Substitute:
MF	12	(England) Andy King (substituted on)
Manager:
(England) Howard Kendall

Match rules

- 90 minutes.
- 30 minutes of extra-time if necessary.
- One named substitute.
- Maximum of one substitution.

=== European Cup ===
Date	Opponents	Venue	Result	Scorers	Attendance	Report 1	Report 2
14-Sep-83	Odense BK	A	1–0	Dalglish 14'	30,000	Report	Report
28-Sep-83	Odense BK	H	5–0	Robinson 14', 72' Dalglish 32', 40' Own goal 65'	14,985	Report	Report
19-Oct-83	Athletic Bilbao	H	0–0		33,063	Report	Report
02-Nov-83	Athletic Bilbao	A	1–0	Rush 66'	47,500	Report	Report
07-Mar-84	Benfica	H	1–0	Rush 66'	39,096	Report	Report
21-Mar-84	Benfica	A	4–1	Whelan 9', 87' Johnston 33' Rush 79'	70,000	Report	Report
11-Apr-84	Dinamo Bucharest	H	1–0	Lee 25'	36,941	Report	Report
25-Apr-84	Dinamo Bucharest	A	2–1	Rush 11', 84'	60,000	Report	Report

Final

30 May 1984
20:15 CET

Liverpool (England)	1–1 (a.e.t.)	(Italy) AS Roma
Neal 13'	Report; Report	Pruzzo 42'
Penalties
Nicol (penalty missed); Neal (penalty scored); Souness (penalty scored); Rush (penalty scored); Kennedy (penalty scored)	4–2	(penalty scored) Di Bartolomei; (penalty missed) Conti; (penalty scored) Righetti; (penalty missed) Graziani

Stadio Olimpico, Rome
Attendance: 69,693
Referee: Erik Fredriksson (Sweden)

Liverpool	AS Roma

GK	1	(Zimbabwe) Bruce Grobbelaar
RB	2	(England) Phil Neal	(yellow card) 32'
LB	3	(England) Alan Kennedy
CB	4	(Republic of Ireland) Mark Lawrenson
LM	5	(Republic of Ireland) Ronnie Whelan
CB	6	(Scotland) Alan Hansen
SS	7	(Scotland) Kenny Dalglish		(substituted off) 94'
RM	8	(England) Sammy Lee
CF	9	(Wales) Ian Rush
CM	10	(Australia) Craig Johnston		(substituted off) 72'
CM	11	(Scotland) Graeme Souness (c)
Substitutes:
FW	12	(Republic of Ireland) Michael Robinson		(substituted on) 94'
GK	13	(England) Bob Bolder
DF	14	(Scotland) Steve Nicol		(substituted on) 72'
FW	15	(England) David Hodgson
DF	16	(Scotland) Gary Gillespie
Manager:
(England) Joe Fagan

GK	1	(Italy) Franco Tancredi
RB	2	(Italy) Michele Nappi
CB	3	(Italy) Sebastiano Nela
CB	4	(Italy) Ubaldo Righetti
CM	5	(Brazil) Paulo Roberto Falcão
LB	6	(Italy) Dario Bonetti
SS	7	(Italy) Bruno Conti	(yellow card) 15'
CM	8	(Brazil) Toninho Cerezo		(substituted off) 115'
CF	9	(Italy) Roberto Pruzzo		(substituted off) 64'
DM	10	(Italy) Agostino Di Bartolomei (c)
CF	11	(Italy) Francesco Graziani
Substitutions:
GK	12	(Italy) Astutillo Malgioglio
DF	13	(Italy) Emidio Oddi
MF	14	(Italy) Mark Tullio Strukelj		(substituted on) 115'
FW	15	(Italy) Odoacre Chierico		(substituted on) 64'
FW	16	(Italy) Francesco Vincenzi
Manager:
(Sweden) Nils Liedholm
