= Claudio Garella =

Italian footballer (1955–2022)

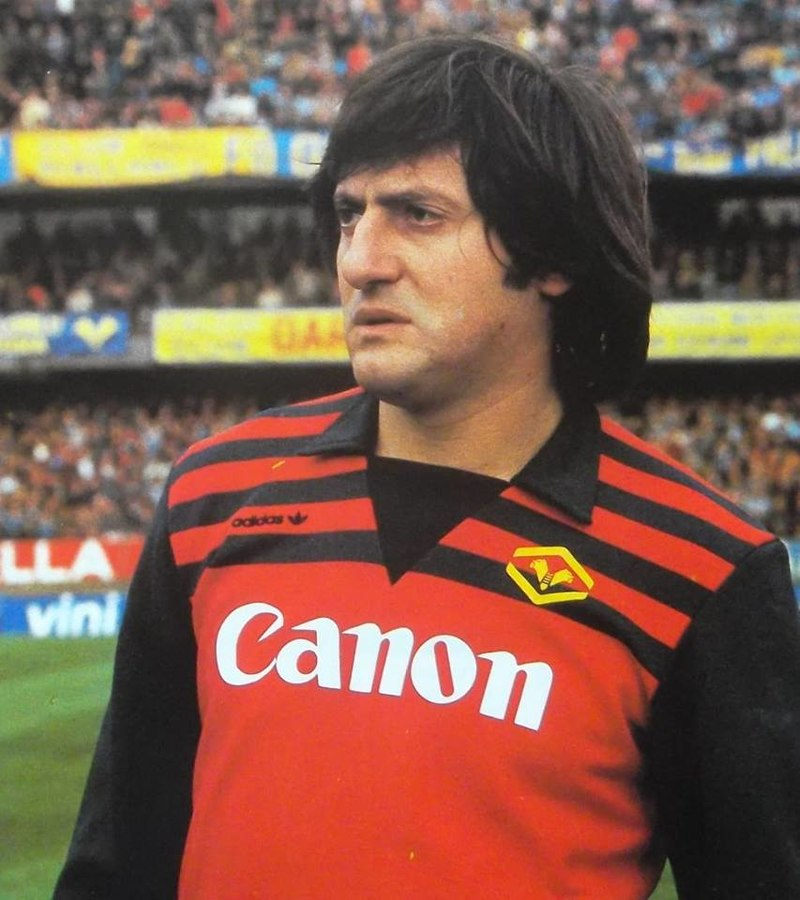
- Garella with Hellas Verona

Personal information
- Date of birth: 16 May 1955
- Place of birth: Turin, Italy
- Date of death: 12 August 2022 (aged 67)
- Place of death: Turin, Italy
- Height: 1.84 m (6 ft 0 in)
- Position: Goalkeeper

Senior career*
Years	Team	Apps	(Gls)
1972–1973	Torino	1	(0)
1973–1975	Casale	68	(1)
1975–1976	Novara	38	(0)
1976–1978	Lazio	29	(0)
1978–1981	Sampdoria	113	(0)
1981–1985	Hellas Verona	119	(0)
1985–1988	Napoli	88	(0)
1988–1990	Udinese	63	(0)
1990–1991	Avellino	2	(0)
Total		521	(1)
- * Club domestic league appearances and goals

Claudio Garella (16 May 1955 – 12 August 2022) was an Italian professional footballer who played as a goalkeeper.

== Early life ==
Garella was born in Turin in 1955, to parents Piera and Domenico. He first started playing football with Auxilium Monterosa, before joining the Torino youth system.

== Playing career ==
Garella made his Serie A debut with Torino during the 1972–73 Serie A season, appearing in the final eight minutes of a 1–0 defeat to Lanerossi Vicenza, replacing Luciano Castellini; this was his only appearance for the club. In 1973, he joined JuniorCasale, where he remained for two seasons, first in Serie D and subsequently Serie C, even scoring a goal from a penalty.

In 1975, he joined Novara, helping the club to a sixth–place finish in Serie B. The following season he joined Lazio, breaking into the starting line-up during his second season with the club at the age of 22, after initially serving as a back-up to Felice Pulici during his first season; however, he endured criticism from the Italian press during this period, due to his error–prone performances.

In 1978, he moved to Sampdoria, where he spent three seasons in Serie B, before moving to Hellas Verona. Under manager Osvaldo Bagnoli, he helped the club win promotion back to Serie A, reach the 1984 Coppa Italia Final, and played a decisive role in helping the team win the 1984–85 Serie A title for the first time in the club's history, including producing a series of crucial saves in a 0–0 away draw against Roma. His performances and role in the club's league title victory earned him a move to Napoli, in part due to the insistence of Diego Maradona, where he won a domestic double during the 1986–87 season, and narrowly missed out on another league title during his third season, which was his last at the club.

After two and a half seasons in Serie B with Udinese, Garella retired at the age of 36 after the conclusion of the 1990–91 Serie B season with Avellino, collecting two appearances with the club.

Despite his playing ability at his peak, he never appeared for the Italy national team, in part due to heavy competition from other world class Italian goalkeepers at the time, such as Giovanni Galli, Franco Tancredi, Stefano Tacconi, and Walter Zenga.

== Style of play ==
"Garella is the best goalkeeper in the world. Without his hands, however."

— Gianni Agnelli

Garella was a large, physically imposing, and acrobatic goalkeeper, who was known for his agility, bravery, and reflexes despite his sturdy build, as well as his unorthodox and spectacular – yet efficient – shot-stopping ability, namely his capacity to make saves with any part of his body, including his penchant for stopping the ball with his feet. He was also highly regarded for his speed when rushing off his line and his ability to get to ground quickly to parry, punch, or claim low balls. However, he also drew criticism from pundits, including Gianni Brera, in his youth due to his inconsistency, as he was also occasionally known for his tendency to commit errors, which were dubbed "garellate" by Rai journalist Beppe Viola during the 1970s; as such, he also came to be known by the nickname Paperella by the Lazio fans, who were his team at the time. Despite initial skepticism towards him in the media due to his perceived unrefined and instinctive playing style, he was able to perform at a high level and contribute to Verona's scudetto victory during the 1984–85 season, with his performances later earning him critical praise as well as the superhero inspired nickname Garellik, a reference to Diabolik.

== After retirement ==
Following his retirement, Garella coached the Turin–based Prima Categoria side U.S.D. Barracuda. In 2011 he served as a goalkeeping coach with Pergocrema. During the 2012–13 season, he was named the youth coach of juniores del Cit Turin. On 26 September 2013 he took over as first team coach of Barracuda in the Prima Categoria.

Garella also worked as a sporting director for amateur club Pecetto Torinese, in the province of Turin, who played in the Promozione division, and later served as a scout for Canavese in Serie D. In 2015 he was appointed the technical director of Barracuda in the Seconda Categoria.

== Personal life ==
Garella was married to Laura. The couple had two daughters: Claudia and Chantal.

== Honours ==
Hellas Verona

- Serie A: 1984–85

Napoli

- Serie A: 1986–87
- Coppa Italia: 1986–87
