= Agostino Di Bartolomei =

Italian footballer (1955–1994)

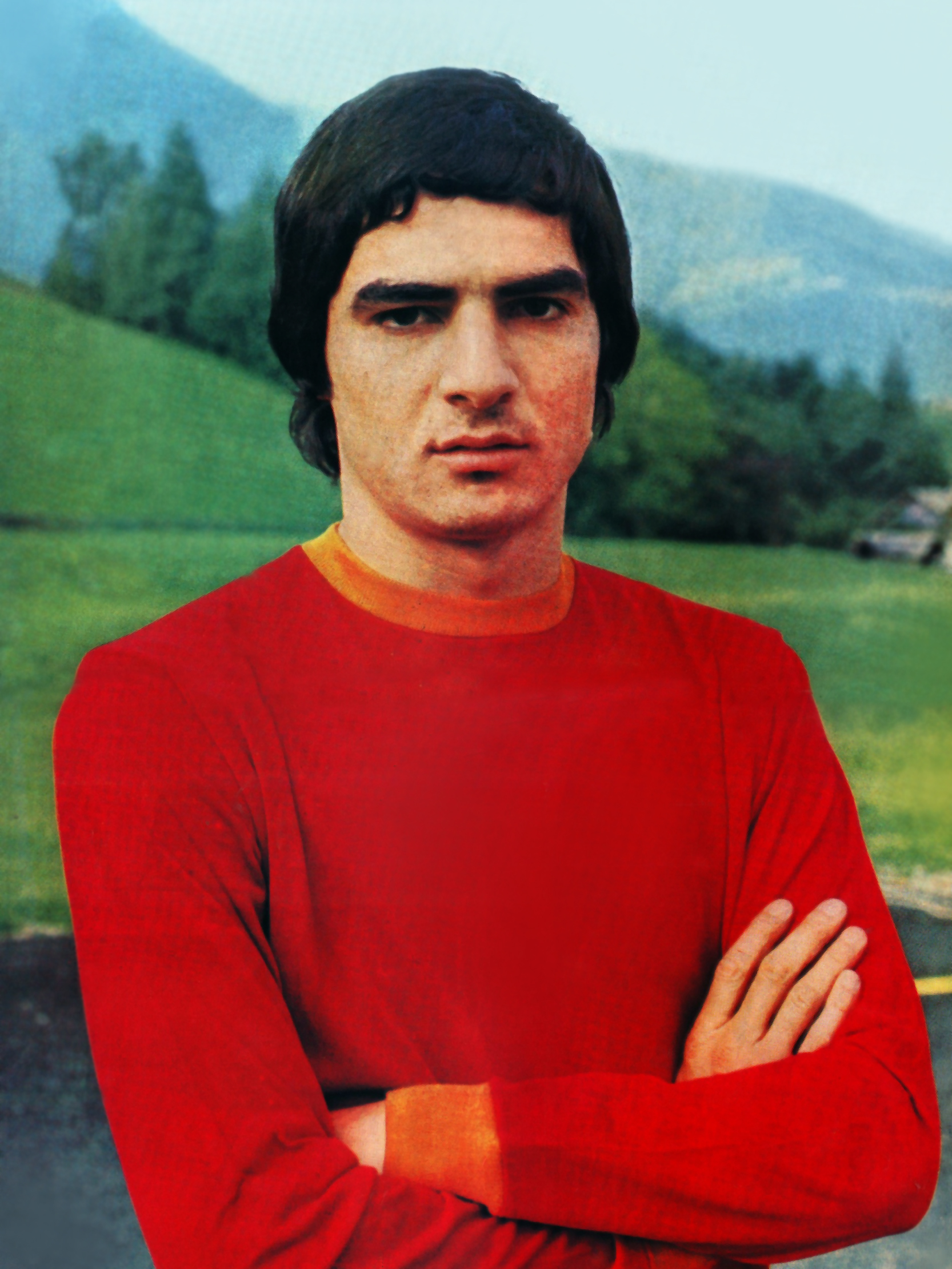
- Agostino Di Bartolomei with Roma in the 1974–75 season

Personal information
- Full name: Agostino Di Bartolomei
- Date of birth: 8 April 1955
- Place of birth: Rome, Italy
- Date of death: 30 May 1994 (aged 39)
- Place of death: San Marco di Castellabate, Italy
- Height: 1.80 m (5 ft 11 in)
- Positions: Central midfielder; sweeper

Youth career
- Roma

Senior career*
Years	Team	Apps	(Gls)
1972–1984	Roma	237	(50)
1975–1976	→ Lanerossi (loan)	33	(4)
1984–1987	Milan	88	(9)
1987–1988	Cesena	25	(4)
1988–1990	Salernitana	52	(16)
Total		435	(83)

International career
1976–1978	Italy U-21	8	(7)
- * Club domestic league appearances and goals

Agostino Di Bartolomei (8 April 1955 in Rome – 30 May 1994 in San Marco di Castellabate) was an Italian football player, who played as a midfielder or as a defender, in a sweeper role. Famed for his elegance on the ball and playmaking skills, he is regarded as one of A.S. Roma's greatest players ever, and one of the greatest Italian players never to have been capped by the Italy national team.

== Career ==
Di Bartolomei was born in a suburb of Rome. He started as a football player in the Garbatella and was recruited in the A.S. Roma junior team at fourteen. He was soon asked to play in the main team, making his debut in the Italian Serie A during the 1972–73 season.

In 1975, he went on loan to Lanerossi Vicenza in Serie B to 'build up his bones' (Bruno Conti another future Roma star, was dispatched to Genoa for the same reason), returning to Rome in 1976 as one of the leading and indispensable players of the team.

After Nils Liedholm's return as coach of A.S. Roma, Di Bartolomei became the team's undisputed leader, raising to the title of captain and becoming a fan favourite. When he played, it was common to hear the Roma fans sing the chant "Oh, Agostino... Ago, Ago, Ago, Agostino gol!"

Despite his goalscoring prowess, Roma had several superb playmakers, in Di Bartolomei, compatriot Bruno Conti, and the Brazilians Falcão and Toninho Cerezo. Thus, Liedholm decided to move Di Bartolomei in front of the defence for protection, knocking precise passes up the field, with Falcão and Ceerezo played in the centre, while Conti would assume a more attacking role behind the forwards. During his time at Roma, he won the Coppa Italia three times, and a memorable scudetto in 1983. The following season, marked by the penalty shootout defeat in the 1984 European Cup final held in Rome against Liverpool, was his last with A.S. Roma; although Di Bartolomei was able to net Roma's first spot kick, later misses by Bruno Conti and Francesco Graziani ultimately proved to be decisive.

After leaving Roma, he was transferred to A.C. Milan that was undergoing a rebuilding process after a disastrous period in which they were relegated to the Serie B twice. After three seasons he left Milan and his career fizzled out after playing for Cesena and Salernitana. He finally retired in 1990.

== Style of play ==
A tactically intelligent and versatile team player, Di Bartolomei usually played as a central or defensive midfielder in front of the defensive line in a deep-lying playmaker role; he was also capable of playing in a more advanced role, or in the centre of his team's defensive line, where he usually functioned as a sweeper, a position in which he was frequently deployed during Roma's Scudetto victory in the 1982–83 season, due to his ability to play the ball out from the back or advance into midfield with his head up while in possession of the ball. A quick and hard-working midfielder, although he was not gifted with significant pace, he was known for his stamina and long stride, which enabled him to cover the pitch effectively. A technically gifted playmaker, he was known for his vision, long passing, and ability to dictate play. He was also noted for his long-range shooting and proficiency from free kicks and penalties. In addition to his playing ability, he was also known for his outstanding tenacity and charismatic leadership as Roma's captain, both on and off the pitch, in spite of his introverted character. He was also regarded as a serious, composed, and correct player, who was known for his fair play, honesty, and discipline as a footballer. Throughout his career, he was given the nickname Diba.

== Retirement and death ==
Di Bartolomei killed himself with a single gunshot to his chest in San Marco di Castellabate, on 30 May 1994, ten years to the day after Roma had lost the European Cup final to Liverpool on penalties.

He is a member of the A.S. Roma Hall of Fame.

== Honours ==
=== Club ===
AS Roma

- Serie A: 1982–83
- Coppa Italia: 1979–80, 1980–81, 1983–84
- European Cup Runner-up: 1983–84

=== Individual ===
- A.S. Roma Hall of Fame: 2012
- Italian Football Hall of Fame: 2023
