= Mark Strukelj =

Italian footballer (born 1962)

Personal information
- Full name: Mark Tullio Strukelj
- Date of birth: 23 June 1962 (age 64)
- Place of birth: Dorking, England
- Position: Midfielder

Team information
- Current team: Triestina (assistant)

Senior career*
Years	Team	Apps	(Gls)
1979–1983	Triestina	58	(8)
1983–1984	Roma	11	(1)
1984–1985	Pisa	6	(0)
1985–1986	did not play		
1986–1988	Reggiana	0	(0)
1988–1990	Treviso	32	(4)
1990–1992	Arezzo	47	(1)
1992–1993	Pistoiese	25	(4)
1993–1994	Castel San Pietro		
- * Club domestic league appearances and goals

Mark Tullio Strukelj (born 23 June 1962) is an English-Italian former professional footballer who played as a midfielder who is an assistant coach at Triestina.

== Early life ==
Strukelj's parents emigrated from Trieste to Australia before settling in England, where he was born to an Italian father and an English mother.

== Playing career ==
Strukelj played one season in the Serie A for A.S. Roma (1983–84), mostly as a backup to Brazilian star Paulo Roberto Falcão, winning the Coppa Italia. He also came on as a substitute with 5 minutes to go in extra time in the 1984 European Cup Final against Liverpool, a club of which he is a fan; Roma lost in the subsequent penalty shoot-out.

His career was hampered by the chronic injury of his ankle that forced him to retire at the age of 30.

== Coaching career ==
After starting a career as a youth coach at Triestina, he became Attilio Tesser's right-hand man on all of his coaching roles from 2003 onwards.

== Personal life ==
Strukelj was born in England to an Italian father and an English mother, and moved to Trieste (the city of origin of his father) with his family at the age of 2. He spent occasionally time in England with his maternal grandparents, which led him to become a Liverpool fan.

His son Kevin Strukelj is also a professional footballer.

== Honours ==
Roma

- Coppa Italia winner: 1983–84.
