= Emidio Oddi =

Italian footballer (born 1956)

Personal information
- Date of birth: 22 July 1956 (age 70)
- Place of birth: Castorano, Italy
- Height: 1.76 m (5 ft 9 1/2 in)
- Position: Defender

Senior career*
Years	Team	Apps	(Gls)
1976	Sulmona	6	(0)
1977	Ascoli	0	(0)
1977–1978	Fermana	34	(0)
1978–1979	Anconitana	33	(0)
1979–1983	Verona	122	(6)
1983–1989	Roma	152	(2)
1989–1992	Udinese	70	(0)
- * Club domestic league appearances and goals

Emidio Oddi (born 22 July 1956 in Castorano) is an Italian former professional footballer who played as a defender.

== Career ==
Oddi played for 8 seasons in the Serie A for Hellas Verona F.C., A.S. Roma and Udinese Calcio. He also played for Roma in the 1983–84 European Cup, scoring a goal in the quarterfinal against BFC Dynamo. He did not play in the final defeat to Liverpool.

== Honours ==
Verona

- Serie B: 1981–82

Roma

- Coppa Italia: 1983–84, 1985–86
