= Erik Fredriksson =

Swedish football referee

- Born: 13 February 1943 (age 83); Tidaholm, Sweden

Domestic
Years	League	Role
1971–1990	Allsvenskan	Referee

International
Years	League	Role
1973–1990	FIFA-listed	Referee

Erik Fredriksson (born 13 February 1943) is a former Swedish football referee. He officiated four World Cup games: Yugoslavia v Northern Ireland in 1982; Italy v Bulgaria (the tournament opening match) and USSR v Belgium in 1986; and Argentina v USSR in 1990. He was also the referee for the 1984 European Cup Final between AS Roma and Liverpool. Fredriksson also refereed the Euro 84 first-round tie between Belgium and Yugoslavia in Lens.

He was also a linesman in the final of the 1986 World Cup between Argentina and West Germany.

Preceded by European Cup Final 1983 (Romania) Nicolae Rainea	European Cup Referees; Final 1984 (Sweden) Erik Fredriksson	Succeeded by European Cup Final 1985 (Switzerland) André Daina
