= Alan Kennedy =

English footballer (born 1954)

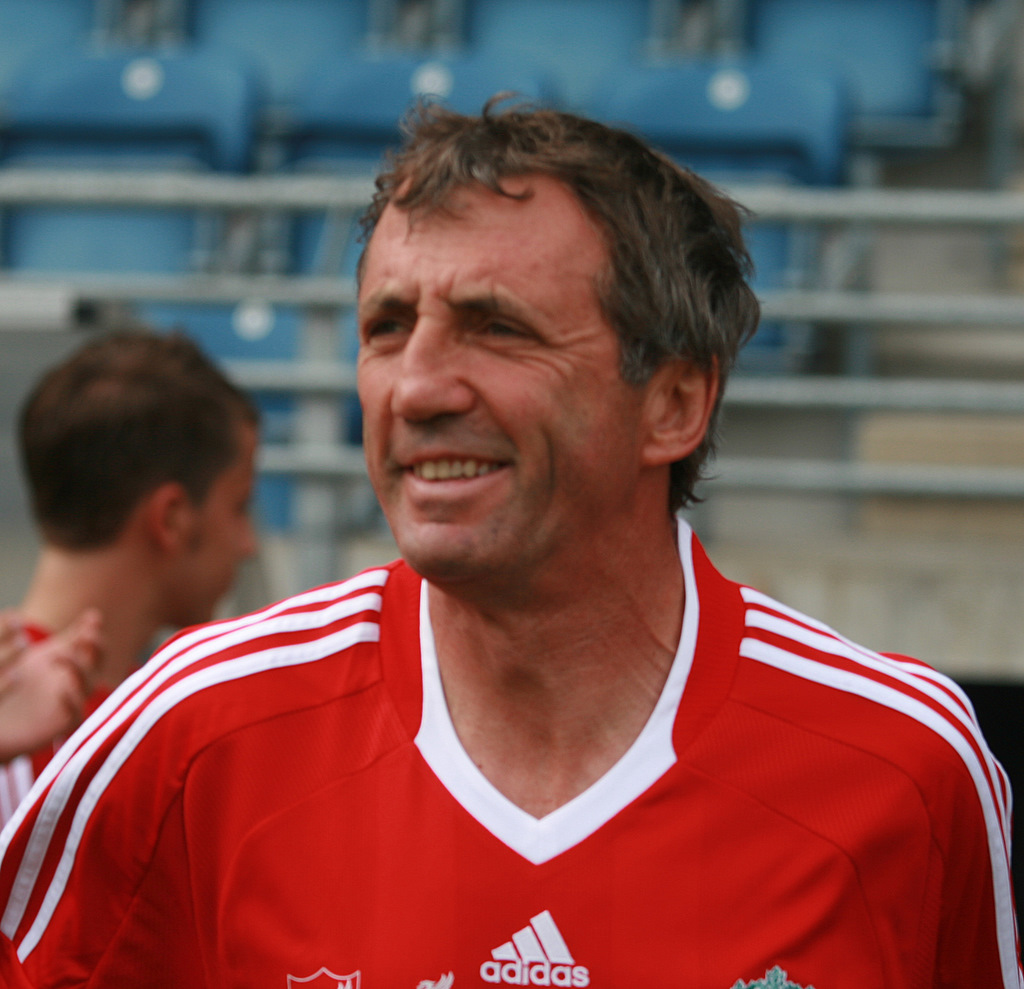

Personal information
- Date of birth: 31 August 1954 (age 72)
- Place of birth: Penshaw, England
- Height: 5 ft 9 in (1.75 m)
- Position: Left back

Senior career*
Years	Team	Apps	(Gls)
1972–1978	Newcastle United	158	(9)
1978–1986	Liverpool	251	(15)
1986–1987	Sunderland	54	(2)
1987	Wigan Athletic	22	(0)
1987	Hartlepool United	5	(0)
1987	B 1903		
1988	Beerschot		
1988–1989	Northwich Victoria		
1989	Colne Dynamoes		
1989–1990	Wrexham	16	(0)
1990–1991	Morecambe		
1991–1992	Netherfield		
1992–1993	Radcliffe Borough		
1993–1994	Barrow		
Total		506	(26)

International career
1974–1976	England U23	6	(0)
1978–1980	England B	7	(2)
1984	England	2	(0)
- * Club domestic league appearances and goals

Alan Kennedy (born 31 August 1954) is an English former professional footballer who played the majority of his career as a left back for Newcastle United and then Liverpool. He was a stalwart of the Liverpool team that won many honours from the late 1970s to the mid-1980s, which includes two European Cups in 1981 and 1984, with Kennedy scoring the winner in both finals.

At different times Kennedy was active as a professional in England, Denmark, Belgium and Wales, making over 500 appearances in a career that lasted for 22 years. He also represented England at senior international level. In 2026, Kennedy was listed at number 39 in an official club poll of Liverpool's greatest players.

== Club career ==
Born in Sunderland, Kennedy started his professional career at the age of 18 for Newcastle United. After establishing his place in the side he played there for five years. He was a member of the teams that lost the 1974 FA Cup Final to Liverpool and the 1976 League Cup Final to Manchester City. In 1978 he was transferred to Liverpool for £330,000, at the time a British record amount for a full-back.

Kennedy scored in the 1981 League Cup final against West Ham, which ended 1–1 and was won by Liverpool in the replay. He scored the equalising goal with 15 minutes left in the game in the 1983 League Cup final against Manchester United, a match Liverpool went on to win in extra time. Kennedy was a member of two other League Cup–winning Liverpool teams: in 1982 (against Tottenham Hotspur) and 1984 (against Everton).

In the 1981 European Cup final against Real Madrid, Kennedy scored the only goal of the match late in the second half. The 1984 European Cup final between Liverpool and Roma was tied at 1–1 after extra time, so the winner was determined by penalty kicks. Kennedy scored the decisive penalty (the fifth taken by the team, the fourth that was successful) that clinched the victory for Liverpool.

Kennedy was a regular player in the Liverpool teams that won five league championship titles, in 1978–79, 1979–80, 1981–82, 1982–83 and 1983–84.

== International career ==
He also earned two caps for the England national team in 1984.

== Personal life ==
His elder brother is fellow footballer Keith Kennedy. His nephew is Tom Kennedy, Keith's son.

In 2019 and 2020, Kennedy featured as a guest substitute player in both seasons of ITV show Harry's Heroes, which featured former football manager Harry Redknapp attempting to return a squad of former England international footballers to sufficient fitness for a game against Germany legends.

Mural of Kennedy holding the European Cup which he won for Liverpool in 1981 with the winning goal in the final, a feat he would repeat in the 1984 final

== Honours ==
Newcastle United

- FA Cup runner-up: 1973–74
- Football League Cup runner-up: 1975–76

Liverpool

- Football League First Division: 1978–79, 1979–80, 1981–82, 1982–83, 1983–84, 1985-86
- Football League Cup: 1980–81, 1981–82, 1982–83, 1983–84
- European Cup: 1980–81, 1983–84
- FA Charity Shield: 1979, 1980, 1982
