= Odoacre Chierico =

Italian footballer and coach

Personal information
- Date of birth: 28 March 1959 (age 67)
- Place of birth: Rome, Italy
- Height: 1.79 m (5 ft 10 in)
- Position: Midfielder

Senior career*
Years	Team	Apps	(Gls)
1976–1979	Internazionale	18	(0)
1979–1981	Pisa	58	(7)
1981–1985	Roma	77	(6)
1985–1988	Udinese	74	(5)
1988–1989	Cesena	20	(0)
1989–1990	Ascoli	15	(0)
1991	Barletta	11	(0)
1991–1992	Gubbio	10	(0)

Managerial career
- 2006: Astrea
- 2006–2007: Guidonia
- 2007: Pomezia
- 2008: Potenza
- * Club domestic league appearances and goals

Odoacre Chierico (born 28 March 1959) is an Italian professional football coach and a former player who played as a midfielder.

== Personal life ==
His son Luca is also a footballer.

== Honours ==
=== Club ===
Inter

- Coppa Italia: 1977–78

Roma

- Serie A: 1982–83
- Coppa Italia: 1983–84
