= Francesco Vincenzi =

Italian footballer and coach

Personal information
- Date of birth: 30 September 1956 (age 70)
- Place of birth: Bagnolo Mella, Italy
- Height: 1.74 m (5 ft 8 1/2 in)
- Position: Striker

Senior career*
Years	Team	Apps	(Gls)
1973–1974	Milan	1	(0)
1974–1975	Monza	25	(8)
1975–1977	Milan	19	(4)
1977–1978	L.R. Vicenza	10	(0)
1978–1979	Bologna	24	(4)
1979–1980	Monza	24	(9)
1980–1981	Milan	25	(7)
1981–1982	Brescia	25	(4)
1982–1983	Pistoiese	35	(11)
1983–1984	Roma	11	(1)
1984–1987	Ascoli	77	(15)
1987–1988	Lecce	32	(4)
1988–1990	Barletta	58	(13)
1990–1991	Como	29	(5)
1991–1992	Varese	22	(3)

Managerial career
- 2006: Pro Sesto
- 2007–2009: Dellese
- 2009–2010: Castelmella
- 2010–2011: Carpenedolo
- * Club domestic league appearances and goals

Francesco Vincenzi (born 30 September 1956 in Bagnolo Mella) is an Italian professional football coach and a former player, who played as a forward.

== Career ==
=== Player ===
He played 8 seasons (108 games, 14 goals) in the Serie A for A.C. Milan, Vicenza Calcio, Bologna F.C. 1909, A.S. Roma and Ascoli Calcio 1898. He won the Coppa Italia with Milan in 1977 and with Roma in 1984. During the latter season, he also played for Roma in the 1983–84 European Cup, scoring a goal against IFK Göteborg, as the club went on to reach the final, only to lose out to Liverpool on penalties.

=== Coach ===
During the 2010–11 season, he was the head coach of Carpenedolo in Serie D.

== Honours ==
Milan

- Coppa Italia winner: 1976–77.

Roma

- Coppa Italia winner: 1983–84.
