= Massimo Storgato =

Italian footballer and manager

Personal information
- Date of birth: 1 June 1961 (age 65)
- Place of birth: Turin, Italy
- Height: 1.83 m (6 ft 0 in)
- Position: Defender

Senior career*
Years	Team	Apps	(Gls)
1978–1983	Juventus	7	(0)
1979–1980	→ Atalanta (loan)	18	(0)
1981–1982	→ Cesena (loan)	15	(0)
1983–1984	Verona	26	(3)
1984–1985	Lazio	25	(0)
1985–1989	Udinese	98	(4)
1987–1988	→ Avellino (loan)	12	(0)
1989–1991	Cosenza	42	(1)
1991–1992	Alessandria	18	(0)
1992–1993	Cosenza	0	(0)
1993–1996	Pro Vercelli	90	(8)

Managerial career
- 2003–2007: Juventus (youth)
- 2007–2008: Canavese
- 2009–2010: Pizzighettone
- 2010: Chieri
- * Club domestic league appearances and goals

Massimo Storgato (born 3 June 1961, in Turin) is an Italian professional football coach and a former player, who played as a defender.

== Honours ==
Juventus

- Serie A champion: 1980–81.
- Coppa Italia winner: 1982–83.
