= Bruno Conti =

Italian footballer (born 1955)

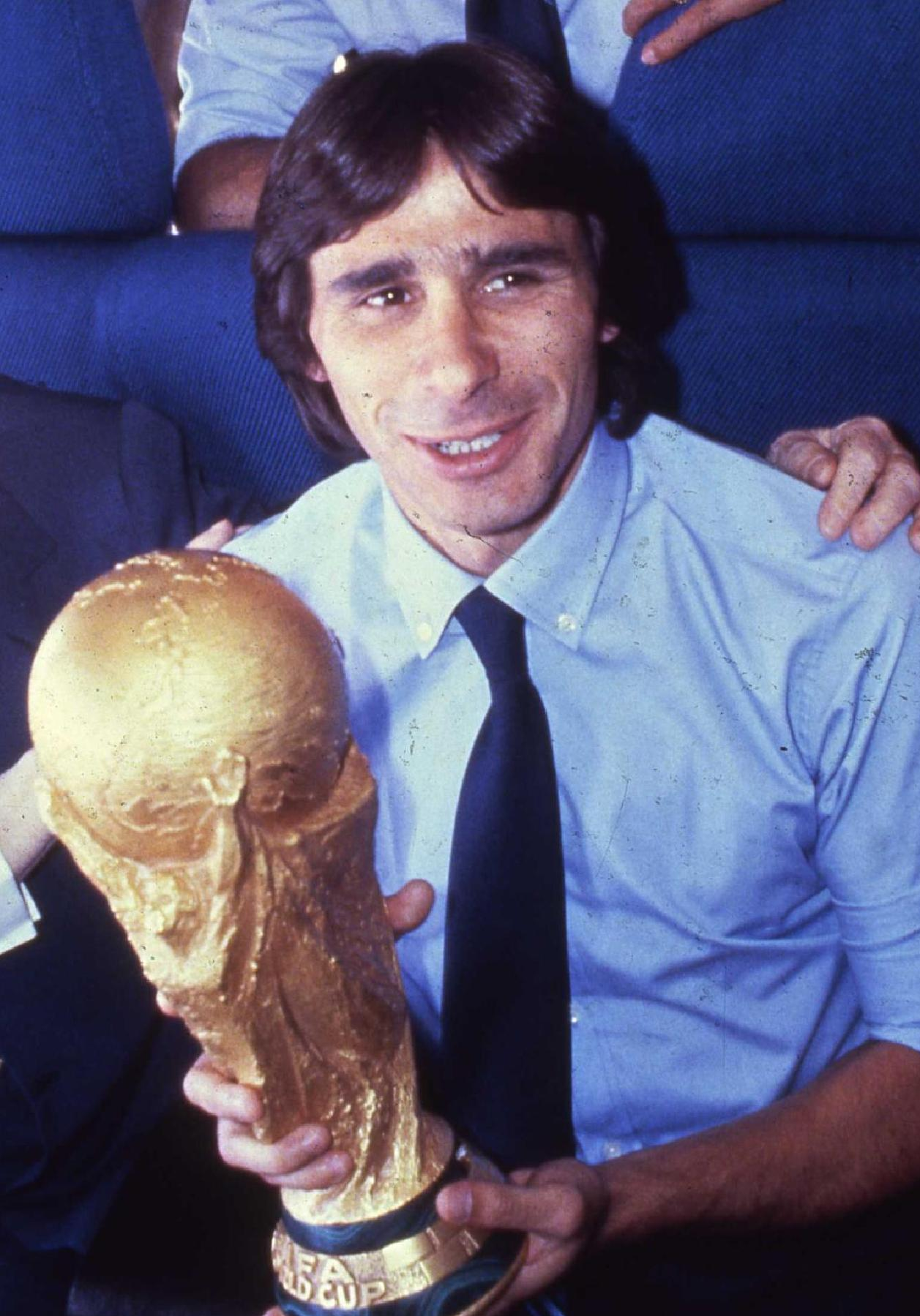
- Conti holding the FIFA World Cup trophy in 1982

Personal information
- Date of birth: 13 March 1955 (age 71)
- Place of birth: Nettuno, Italy
- Height: 1.69 m (5 ft 7 in)
- Position: Winger

Team information
- Current team: Roma (head of youth development)

Senior career*
Years	Team	Apps	(Gls)
1973–1991	Roma	402	(37)
1975–1976	→ Genoa (loan)	36	(3)
1978–1979	→ Genoa (loan)	32	(1)
Total		470	(41)

International career
1980–1986	Italy	37	(5)

Managerial career
- 1991–1992: Roma (Berretti)
- 1992–1993: Roma (Primavera)
- 2005: Roma (caretaker)
Medal record
Men's football
Representing Italy
FIFA World Cup
Winner	1982 Spain
- * Club domestic league appearances and goals

Bruno Conti (Italian pronunciation: [ˈbruːno ˈkonti]; born 13 March 1955) is an Italian football manager and former player. He is currently head of AS Roma's youth sector.

Throughout his playing career, Conti was usually deployed as a winger, and also previously played for Roma, where he spent his entire club career, aside from two season-long loan spells with Genoa in the 1970s. He is considered by many in the sport to be one of the greatest Italian players of all time in his position. Nicknamed "The Mayor of Rome", Conti was an important figure in the club's history, and won a league title as well as five Coppa Italia titles during his time in the Italian capital.

At the international level, he was a member of Italy's 1982 FIFA World Cup-winning team, and also took part in the 1986 FIFA World Cup.

== Early life ==
A native of Nettuno, a comune in the province of Rome, Conti is one of seven children and was a keen baseball player in his youth. His father Andrea was a bricklayer.

== Club career ==
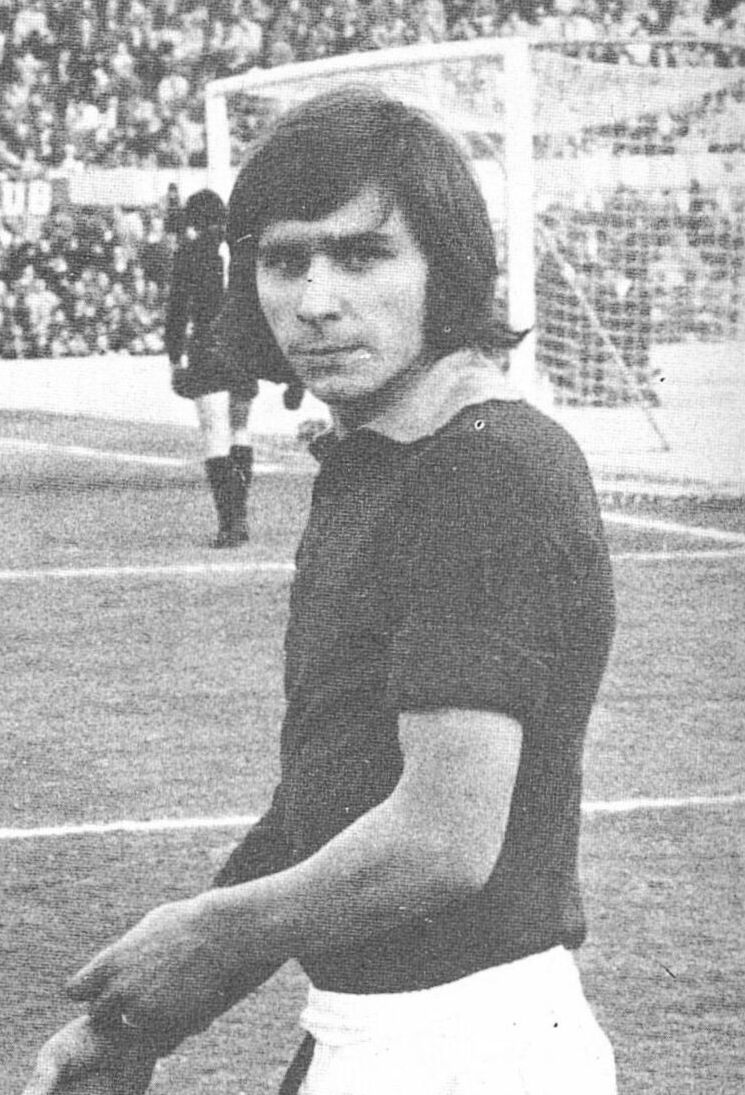
Conti with Roma in 1974

Apart from two year-long loan spells at Genoa in Serie B during the 1975–76 (during which he won the Serie B title) and the 1978–79 seasons, Conti spent his entire career at Roma. He had initially been a member of the club's youth squad between 1972 and 1974, eventually making his senior club and Serie A debut on 10 February 1974, in a 0–0 home draw against Torino, during the 1973–74 Season, under Nils Liedholm, at the age of 19. As a youngster, he had been overlooked by scouts during trials with several professional clubs, including Roma manager Helenio Herrera, who felt that his physique would not allow him to succeed at the top level, despite his talent.

During his time with the Roma, Conti famously wore the number 7 shirt, and he became an important figure with the club on the right wing, as he won the Scudetto during the 1982–83 season and the Coppa Italia five times between 1979 and 1991. He played a key role in helping Roma to reach the 1984 European Cup Final, where they were defeated on penalties by Liverpool, with Conti missing his penalty in the shootout. He also helped Roma to reach the 1991 UEFA Cup Final, during his final season with the club, also winning his final Coppa Italia that season.

Due to his performances for Roma throughout his club career, Conti was given the nickname: "The Mayor of Rome". He was one of the eleven members to be inducted into the AS Roma Hall of Fame in 2012.

== International career ==
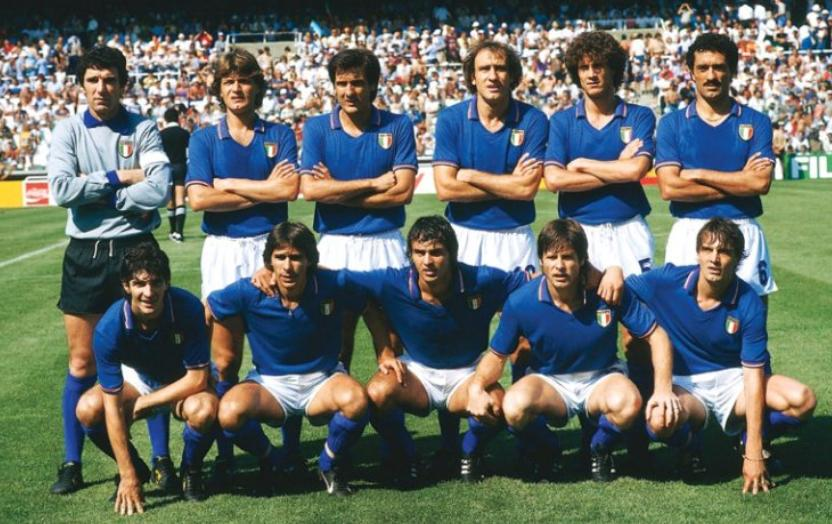
Conti (crouched, second from left) with the Italy national team in 1982

Conti made his senior international debut for Italy on 11 October 1980, in a 2–0 win against Luxembourg. He scored his first goal for Italy in a 2–0 home win against Yugoslavia, in Turin, on 15 November 1980 during their 1982 FIFA World Cup qualifying campaign. Upon becoming a regular member of the Italy national side, he was often regarded as the heir of his more experienced teammate, Causio, due to their similar role and playing styles.

Conti was part of the Italy national side that won the 1982 FIFA World Cup in Spain, featuring in every match of the tournament, and scoring a goal in Italy's first round draw against Peru. In the final against West Germany, despite being booked after 31 minutes, he was a central figure in Italy's second goal that was scored by Marco Tardelli, and he single-handedly created Italy's third goal by breaking down the right side from the half-way line through the German defence, and crossing the ball to Alessandro Altobelli, who scored from the top of the box after 81 minutes. He also won a penalty for Italy during the match, which Cabrini failed to convert. The Italians won the final game 3–1, and they were awarded their third World Cup title. Conti was elected to be part of the team of the tournament for his performances. Due to his pace, flair, creativity, influence, and technical ability, Conti was given the nickname "Mara-Zico" throughout the World Cup (a reference to the players Maradona and Zico); at the conclusion of the tournament, Pelé stated that he believed that Conti had been the best player of the tournament, and that he was one of the best players in the world.

Conti continued to be an important member of the Italian squad throughout the 1980s, although the team failed to qualify for the 1984 European Championship. Conti took part with Italy at the 1986 FIFA World Cup, playing in every match; the Italians were eliminated in the round of 16. He retired from international football after the tournament, following manager Enzo Bearzot's departure from the national team. In total, he managed 5 goals in 47 appearances for Italy between 1980 and 1986.

== Post-retirement ==
After retiring, Conti remained at Roma as a member of the youth sector's coaching staff. Following the departure of coach Luigi Delneri, he moved up from his position as head of the club's youth teams to first team coach during the 2004–05 season. Conti did not possess a coaching licence, but was a respected figure at the club, and at the time, World Cup winners were exempted from taking the coaching exams needed to obtain an official Serie A coaching licence. He led Roma to the Coppa Italia final and to a UEFA Cup berth. His short-term role as caretaker manager finished when Roma appointed Luciano Spalletti as coach.

Conti later became Technical Director (Direttore tecnico) and is currently in charge of the Youth Sector (Responsabile del Settore Giovanile). In August 2023, he served as acting head coach for Roma's first game of the 2023–24 Serie A season against Salernitana, as both head coach José Mourinho and assistant Salvatore Foti were suspended.

Conti is featured in the football video game FIFA 14's Classic XI – a multi-national all-star team, along with compatriots Giacinto Facchetti, Gianni Rivera, and Franco Baresi.

An Airbus A330neo from ITA Airways, I-ITYF, bears his name.

== Style of play ==
Normally, a winger in midfield or in the offensive line, Conti is regarded as one of Italy's greatest wingers. Despite being left-footed, he was capable of playing on either flank, and also in the centre as an attacking midfielder. However, he was usually deployed on the right as a wide midfielder. A diminutive winger, with a slender physique, Conti was renowned for his pace, dribbling skills, vision, passing, and crossing ability―which allowed to create chances for his teammates, and effectively provide assists. He was also able to function as a playmaker. Due to his speed, stamina, control, flair, and his ability with either foot, he was capable of beating players on the run, as well as during one on one situations, with feints; known for his tactical intelligence, he also had excellent positional sense, and excelled at making attacking runs down the wing to lose his markers and deliver balls into the area to his teammates. Despite not being particularly prolific in front of goal throughout his career—in part due to his centralized role, he also possessed a powerful and accurate shot from distance with either foot. A talent in his youth, Conti later established himself as one of the greatest Italian players of his generation, and is regarded as one of Roma's best ever players.

== Personal life ==
Conti and his wife Laura have two sons, Daniele and Andrea, both former professional footballers. Daniele's son and his grandson, Bruno Conti Jr. plays for Cagliari Primavera.

== Honours ==
Genoa

- Serie B: 1975–76

Roma

- Serie A: 1982–83
- Coppa Italia: 1979–80, 1980–81, 1983–84, 1985–86, 1990–91
- European Cup: runner-up 1983–84

Italy

- FIFA World Cup: 1982

Individual

- Serie A Team of The Year: 1982
- Guerin Sportivo All-Star Team: 1982
- AS Roma Hall of Fame: 2012
- Italian Football Hall of Fame: 2017
