= Francesco Graziani =

Italian footballer

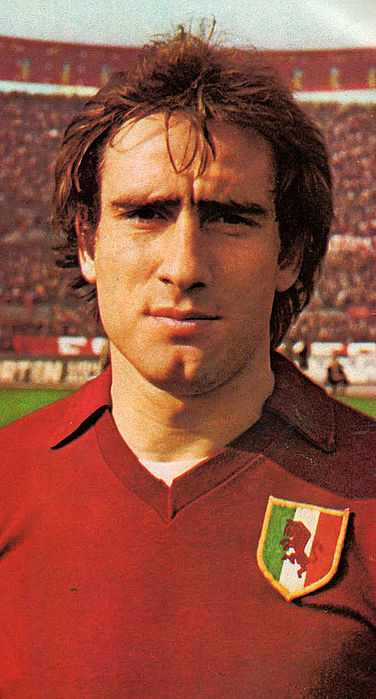
- Graziani at Torino in 1976–77

Personal information
- Date of birth: 16 December 1952 (age 73)
- Place of birth: Subiaco, Italy
- Height: 1.80 m (5 ft 11 in)
- Position: Forward

Youth career
- 1967–1970: Bettini Quadraro

Senior career*
Years	Team	Apps	(Gls)
1970–1973	Arezzo	48	(11)
1973–1981	Torino	221	(97)
1981–1983	Fiorentina	52	(14)
1983–1986	Roma	57	(12)
1986–1988	Udinese	33	(8)
1988	APIA Leichhardt	2	(0)
Total		413	(142)

International career
1973	Italy U21	1	(0)
1975–1983	Italy	64	(23)

Managerial career
- 1989–1990: Fiorentina
- 1990–1991: Reggina
- 1991–1992: Avellino
- 2001–2002: Catania
- 2003–2004: Montevarchi
- 2004–2006: Cervia
- 2013: Vigevano Calcio (Allievi)
Medal record
Men's football
Representing Italy
FIFA World Cup
Winner	1982 Spain
- * Club domestic league appearances and goals

Francesco "Ciccio" Graziani (Italian pronunciation: [franˈtʃesko ˈtʃittʃo ɡratˈtsjaːni]; born 16 December 1952) is an Italian football manager and former football player who played as a forward.

He began his career with Arezzo in 1970, and later joined Torino in 1973, where he remained until 1981, winning a Serie A title in 1976 and the Capocannoniere title as the Serie A top goalscorer in 1977; with 122 total goals scored for Torino, he is the seventh-highest scorer in the history of the Torinese club behind Valentino Mazzola (123). He subsequently moved to Fiorentina, where he narrowly missed out on the Serie A title in his first season, and later also played for Roma between 1983 and 1986, winning two Coppa Italia titles and reaching the 1984 European Cup Final. He later spent two seasons with Udinese, before ending his career with Australian club APIA Leichhardt in 1988.

At international level with the Italy national team, they won the 1982 FIFA World Cup, and made fourth-place finishes at the 1978 FIFA World Cup and UEFA Euro 1980. With 23 official goals, he is the ninth-highest all-time scorer for the Italy national team (tied with Christian Vieri).

He is the father of Gabriele, who was also a professional footballer. He considers himself Roman Catholic.

== Club career ==
Graziani was born in Subiaco, in the province of Rome. A prolific and physical striker, he started his footballing career in Bettini Quadraro before moving to Arezzo and then to Torino in 1973. Graziani played eight seasons for Torino, making his debut in Serie A on 18 November 1973 against Sampdoria and scoring his first goal in the top flight on 16 December of that same year against Bologna. In total, Graziani scored 122 goals in 289 games for Torino, divided as follows: 221 appearances (97 goals) in the league, 45 appearances (17 goals) in the Coppa Italia and 23 appearances (8 goals) in European competition. He won the Scudetto in 1975–76.

During the next season, Graziani emerged as the top-scorer in Serie A with a tally of 21 goals. He formed, in those years, the famous pair nicknamed Gemelli del gol ("Goal twins") with his teammate Paolo Pulici. He helped Torino reach the Coppa Italia final in 1980, but was one of the players who failed to score his penalty in the resulting shoot-out defeat to Roma at the Stadio Olimpico in Rome.

Graziani left Torino when, with his teammate Pecci, he transferred to Fiorentina for two seasons in 1981, missing the title by a single point in the 1981–82 season.

In 1983, he was signed by Roma; they won the Coppa Italia twice (1984 and 1986), and also reached the 1984 European Cup final, losing in a failed penalty shoot-out defeat to Liverpool at the Stadio Olimpico in Rome (Graziani himself missed a penalty in the shoot-out during the match).

After two seasons with Udinese and a brief appearance in the Australian National Soccer League with APIA Leichhardt, Graziani abandoned his playing career in 1988. He totaled 353 appearances, with 130 goals, in the Italian Serie A.

== International career ==
Graziani was also an important international player for Italy: he represented the Azzurri at the 1978 FIFA World Cup, as a reserve behind Paolo Rossi, where they finished in fourth place, and subsequently at the 1980 European Championship on home soil, where he made four appearances, scoring once, as Italy finished in fourth place once again, after reaching the semi-final of the tournament. He made his international debut on 19 April 1975, in a 0–0 home draw in Rome against Poland, and scored his first goal for Italy on 7 April 1976, in a 3–1 home win against Portugal.

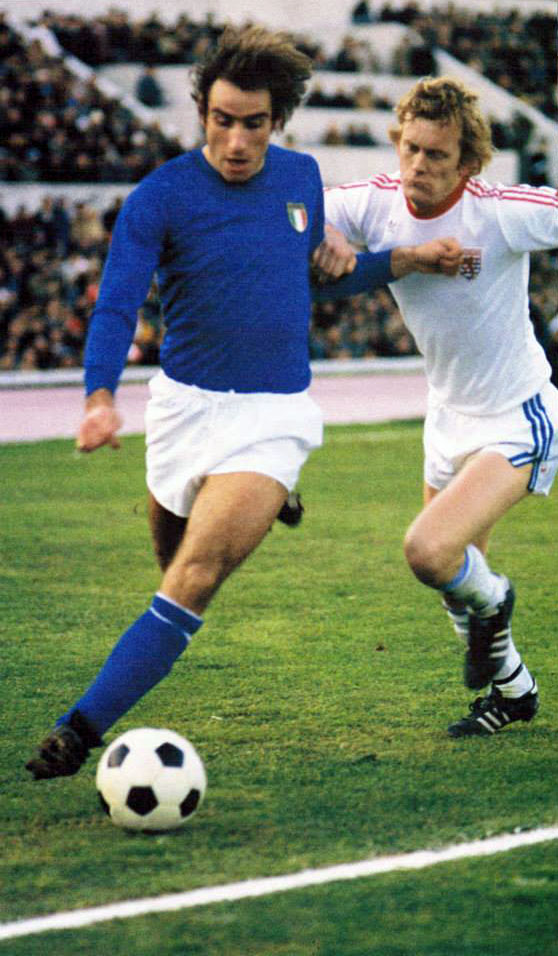
Graziani playing for Italy in 1977

Graziani also played a key role in Italy's victorious 1982 FIFA World Cup campaign: he scored one goal in the 1982 FIFA World Cup in a 1–1 draw against Cameroon, which proved to be decisive for the Azzurri's qualification to the knockout phase, who advanced on number of goals scored, at the expense of the African team; this was Graziani's final goal for Italy. Graziani appeared in all of Italy's matches as the nation went on to win the tournament for the third time in their history. In the final against West Germany, however, he was forced off in the seventh minute of play after sustaining a shoulder injury following a collision with Wolfgang Dremmler, and was replaced by Alessandro Altobelli; Italy won the match 3–1 to claim the title. Graziani's final official appearance for Italy came on 29 May 1983, in a 2–0 away defeat to Sweden in a UEFA Euro 1984 qualifying match.

He returned to the national team for the 25th anniversary of the 1982 FIFA World Cup Final on 27 July 2007 in Stuttgart, scoring twice, with the final score of 4–4. With 23 goals in 64 caps between 1975 and 1983, he is ranked as the ninth-highest all-time scorer for his national team.

== Style of play ==
Graziani was a prolific and versatile forward, known for his composure in front of goal, and was capable of playing as a main striker, in a creative midfield role, or even on the wing, due to his ability to play off of his teammates. Although in his youth he was not known for being particularly skilful, he showed great technical improvements throughout his career; these characteristics, along with his determination, work-rate, eye for goal, heading accuracy, ability in the air, and physical attributes, enabled him to excel as a centre-forward.

== Managerial career ==
Graziani coached a number of teams with little fortune: he managed his former club Fiorentina during the 1989–90 season, in which they narrowly avoided relegation but reached the 1990 UEFA Cup Final, and later coached Reggina in 1990, and Avellino in 1993. In the 2001–02 season, Graziani, who was the managing director of Catania in Serie C1, was successively appointed as manager, and led the Sicilian team to a historic promotion in Serie B.

He then resigned as football coach after the ninth match of the next season, and in 2003–04 he coached Montevarchi of Serie C2 with little success, being fired before the end of the season.

From 2004 to 2006, he coached Cervia, an amateur team of Emilia-Romagna from Eccellenza league which was subject of an Italian reality show, Campioni – Il Sogno. He led the team to an immediate promotion to Serie D, being popular to the public because of his hot-blooded attitudes, especially during league matches. He later also worked for Mediaset as a football pundit.

== Career statistics ==
=== International ===
Scores and results list Italy's goal tally first, score column indicates score after each Baloncieri goal.

List of international goals scored by Francesco Graziani
No.	Date	Venue	Opponent	Score	Result	Competition	Ref.
1	7 April 1976	Stadio Comunale, Turin, Italy	Portugal	2-0	3-1	Friendly	
2	23 May 1976	Robert F. Kennedy Memorial Stadium, Washington, D.C., USA	(United States) Team America	3-0	4-0	1976 U.S.A. Bicentennial Cup Tournament	
3	28 May 1976	Yankee Stadium, New York City, USA	England	1-0	2-3	1976 U.S.A. Bicentennial Cup Tournament	
4	28 May 1976	Yankee Stadium, New York City, USA	England	2-0	2-3	1976 U.S.A. Bicentennial Cup Tournament	
5	5 June 1976	San Siro, Milan, Italy	Romania	1-0	4-2	Friendly	
6	25 September 1976	Stadio Olimpico, Rome, Italy	Yugoslavia	2-0	3-0	Friendly	
7	16 October 1976	Stade Municipal, Luxembourg City, Luxembourg	Luxembourg	1-0	4-1	1978 FIFA World Cup qualification	
8	26 January 1977	Stadio Olimpico, Rome, Italy	Belgium	1-0	2-1	Friendly	
9	15 October 1977	Stadio Comunale, Turin, Italy	Finland	3-0	6-1	1978 FIFA World Cup qualification	
10	3 December 1977	Stadio Olimpico, Rome, Italy	Luxembourg	2-0	3-0	1978 FIFA World Cup qualification	
11	8 February 1978	Stadio San Paolo, Naples, Italy	France	1-0	2-2	Friendly	
12	8 February 1978	Stadio San Paolo, Naples, Italy	France	2-0	2-2	Friendly	
13	23 September 1978	Stadio Comunale, Florence, Italy	Turkey	1-0	1-0	Friendly	
14	17 November 1979	Stadio Friuli, Udine, Italy	Switzerland	1-0	2-0	Friendly	
15	15 March 1980	San Siro, Milan, Italy	Uruguay	1-0	1-0	Friendly	
16	21 June 1980	Stadio San Paolo, Naples, Italy	Czechoslovakia	1-1	1-1	UEFA Euro 1980	
17	24 September 1980	Stadio Luigi Ferraris, Genoa, Italy	Portugal	3-1	3-1	Friendly	
18	1 November 1980	Stadio Olimpico, Rome, Italy	Denmark	1-0	2-0	1982 FIFA World Cup qualification	
19	1 November 1980	Stadio Olimpico, Rome, Italy	Denmark	2-0	2-0	1982 FIFA World Cup qualification	
20	3 June 1981	Idrætspark, Copenhagen, Denmark	Denmark	1-2	1-3	1982 FIFA World Cup qualification	
21	23 September 1981	Stadio Comunale, Bologna, Italy	Bulgaria	1-0	3-2	Friendly	
22	23 September 1981	Stadio Comunale, Bologna, Italy	Bulgaria	2-0	3-2	Friendly	
23	23 June 1982	Estadio Municipal de Balaídos, Vigo, Spain	Cameroon	1-0	1-1	1982 FIFA World Cup	

== Honours ==
=== Player ===
Torino

- Serie A: 1975–76
- Coppa Italia: runner-up 1979–80, 1980–81

Roma

- Coppa Italia: 1983–84, 1985–86
- European Cup: runner-up 1983–84

Italy

- FIFA World Cup: 1982

Individual

- Serie A Top scorer: 1976–77 (21 goals)
- Coppa Italia Top scorer: 1980–81 (5 goals)
- Torino FC Hall of Fame: 2017
- ACF Fiorentina Hall of Fame: 2019

=== Manager ===
Cervia

- Eccellenza: 2004–05 (Group B)
