= Michele Nappi =

Italian footballer

Personal information
- Date of birth: August 30, 1951 (age 75)
- Place of birth: San Gennaro Vesuviano, Italy
- Height: 1.78 m (5 ft 10 in)
- Position: Defender

Senior career*
Years	Team	Apps	(Gls)
1969–1970	Juve Stabia	4	(?)
1970–1973	Palmese	87	(?)
1973–1982	Perugia	181	(1)
1982–1984	Roma	27	(0)
1984–1985	Perugia	33	(0)
- * Club domestic league appearances and goals

Michele Nappi (born August 30, 1951, in San Gennaro Vesuviano) is a retired Italian professional football player who played as a defender. A hard-working and versatile player, he frequently stood out for his professionalism throughout his career.

== Career ==
After beginning his professional career with Juve Stabia and Palmese, Nappi played for 8 seasons (172 games, 1 goal) in the Serie A for Perugia Calcio (1974–1982; 1984–85) and A.S. Roma (1982–84). Most of his career was spent with Perugia, where he won the 1974–75 Serie B title, and was a part of the 1978–79 Serie A season in which Perugia finished the season unbeaten, but still finished second in the league, behind A.C. Milan. After leaving Perugia in 1982, he spent two seasons with Roma, before returning to Perugia for a final season. With Roma, he won the Serie A championship, the Coppa Italia, and reached 1984 European Cup Final, in which Roma were defeated by Liverpool F.C. in the resulting penalty shootout.

== Honours ==
Perugia

- Serie B: 1974–75

Roma

- Serie A: 1982–83
- Coppa Italia: 1983–84
