= Franco Tancredi =

Italian footballer

Personal information
- Date of birth: 10 January 1955 (age 71)
- Place of birth: Giulianova, Italy
- Height: 1.76 m (5 ft 9 in)
- Position: Goalkeeper

Senior career*
Years	Team	Apps	(Gls)
1972–1974	Giulianova	45	(0)
1974–1976	Milan	0	(0)
1976–1977	Rimini	28	(0)
1977–1990	Roma	288	(0)
1990–1991	Torino	6	(0)
Total		361	(0)

International career
1984–1986	Italy	12	(0)

Managerial career
- 1992–2004: Roma (goalkeeper coach)
- 2004–2006: Juventus (goalkeeper coach)
- 2006–2007: Real Madrid (goalkeeper coach)
- 2007–2011: England (goalkeeper coach)
- 2011–2012: Roma (goalkeeper coach)
- 2015: Livorno (goalkeeper coach)
- 2016: Livorno (goalkeeper coach)
- 2016: Ternana (goalkeeper coach)
- 2017–2018: Jiangsu Suning (goalkeeper coach)
- * Club domestic league appearances and goals

Franco Tancredi (Italian pronunciation: [ˈfraŋko taŋˈkreːdi]; born 10 January 1955) is an Italian former footballer who played as a goalkeeper for several Italian clubs, in particular Roma, and the Italy national team. He is a member of the A.S. Roma Hall of Fame.

== Club career ==
Tancredi began his career with Giulianova, and later also played with Milan and Rimini, before joining Roma. He made 288 Serie A appearances for Roma between 1979 and 1990, winning the Scudetto in 1983 and four Coppa Italia titles. In 1987, during a game against Milan at the San Siro, he was hit on the head by a firework thrown by a Milan supporter. He stopped breathing for a short time but was eventually resuscitated by paramedics. He ended his career in 1991 after a season with Torino, where he won the Mitropa Cup but was mainly a back-up to Luca Marchegiani.

In total, he made 294 appearances in Serie A throughout his career, as well as 28 in Serie B, 58 in the Coppa Italia, and 36 in European competitions.

== International career ==
Tancredi represented Italy at the 1984 Summer Olympics and was the number two goalkeeper to Giovanni Galli in Italy's squad at the 1986 FIFA World Cup. He earned 12 caps with the national team between 1984 and 1986, all of which came in friendlies.

== Style of play ==
Regarded as one of the best Italian goalkeepers of his generation, Tancredi was a shot-stopper. Although not particularly tall for a goalkeeper, he gained a reputation as a penalty saving specialist throughout his career. He was also known for his particular diving technique with one arm, which was similar to Rinat Dasayev's technique. Furthermore, he was known for rushing off his line and getting to ground quickly to collect the ball, although he was less adept at coming out to claim crosses and high balls.

== Managerial career ==
After retiring as a player, Tancredi worked as a goalkeeping coach for Roma until 2004 before following coach Fabio Capello to Juventus and taking the same post. At the start of the 2006–07 season, Tancredi followed Capello to work as a goalkeeping coach at Real Madrid.

On 14 December 2007, Tancredi was formally appointed goalkeeping coach of the England national team in line with the appointment of new England manager Fabio Capello. In 2011, Tancredi returned to Roma as part of the technical staff of new coach Luis Enrique. On 13 June, Tancredi left Roma for personal reasons.

== Honours ==
=== Player ===
Roma

- Serie A: 1982–83
- Coppa Italia: 1979–80, 1980–81, 1983–84, 1985–86

Torino

- Mitropa Cup: 1991

Individual

- A.S. Roma Hall of Fame: 2012
