= Toninho Cerezo =

Brazilian footballer (born 1955)

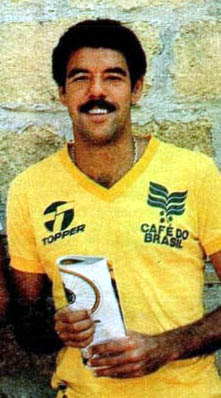
- Cerezo with Brazil at the 1982 World Cup

Personal information
- Full name: Antônio Carlos Cerezo
- Date of birth: 21 April 1955 (age 71)
- Place of birth: Belo Horizonte, Brazil
- Height: 1.83 m (6 ft 0 in)
- Position: Defensive midfielder

Senior career*
Years	Team	Apps	(Gls)
1972–1983	Atlético Mineiro	111	(12)
1973–1974	→ Nacional (AM) (loan)	20	(3)
1983–1986	Roma	70	(13)
1986–1992	Sampdoria	145	(14)
1992–1993	São Paulo	72	(7)
1994	Cruzeiro	10	(3)
1995	Lousano Paulista		
1995–1996	São Paulo	8	(0)
1996	América Mineiro		
1997	Atlético Mineiro		

International career^{‡}
1977–1986	Brazil	57	(5)

Managerial career
- 1999: Vitória
- 2000–2005: Kashima Antlers
- 2005: Guarani
- 2005: Atlético Mineiro
- 2007: Al Hilal
- 2007–2009: Al Shabab
- 2009–2010: Al Ain
- 2010: Sport Recife
- 2012: Vitória
- 2013–2015: Kashima Antlers
- * Club domestic league appearances and goals as of 12 September 2010 ‡ National team caps and goals as of 12 September 2010

Antônio Carlos Cerezo (born 21 April 1955), known as Toninho Cerezo (Brazilian Portuguese: [toˈniɲu sɛˈɾɛzu]), is a Brazilian former footballer. Cerezo is commonly regarded as one of the finest Brazilian defensive midfielders of all time, most notably having played for his hometown's team Atlético Mineiro; he also played for several other clubs in both Brazil and Italy throughout his career.

At international level, Cerezo took part at the 1978 and 1982 FIFA World Cups – winning a bronze medal in the former edition of the tournament – and the 1979 Copa América, where Brazil finished in third place.

== Club career ==
Throughout his career, Cerezo played as a defensive midfielder with Atlético Mineiro, Roma, Cruzeiro, Sampdoria, São Paulo and the Brazil national team.

While playing in Brazil, he won the Bola de Ouro in 1977 and 1980 and the Bola de Prata in 1976.

During his time in Italy, Cerezo won the Coppa Italia four times; in 1991 he won the Serie A with Sampdoria, but lost the Coppa Italia final to AS Roma.

With São Paulo he was a two-time winner of the Intercontinental Cup, and also won the Copa Libertadores once. Cerezo was named the best player of the 1993 Intercontinental Cup final.(He scored the second goal and assisted Müller's game-winning goal in a 3–2 victory against Milan.)

In 1997, he retired as a player, and, after doing some studies and probations in Italy, he returned to Brazil, and start a career as a manager at Vitória, reaching the semifinals of the Brasileirão Série A. He also led Japanese powerhouse Kashima Antlers in the J.League for six years. He won five major titles in Japan, two league championships, one Emperor's Cup, and two league cups.

After his time in Japan, he coached Brazilian clubs Atlético Mineiro, and Guarani, as well as some Asian clubs, such as Al Hilal, Al Shabab, Al Ain; he later returned to Brazil once again as head manager of Sport Recife, leaving the club just one month later.

== International career ==
Cerezo won 57 caps (full international games), between March 1977 and June 1985, with the Brazil national team, scoring five goals.

He played in the 1978 FIFA World Cup, where they finished in third place, and in the 1982 FIFA World Cup, where they were eliminated in the second round in a group which contained defending champions and continental rivals Argentina, as well as the eventual champions Italy. He was also due to go to the 1986 tournament, but a hamstring injury in May ruled him out of the upcoming World Cup. He was a member of the Brazilian team that finished in third place at the 1979 Copa América.

At the 1982 FIFA World Cup one of his back passes was intercepted by Italian striker Paolo Rossi, who went on to score; the match ended in a 2–3 loss to Brazil, which also saw Rossi score a hat-trick, and as a result, Brazil were knocked out of the tournament in a dramatic upset. For many years after the event, he was widely criticized for this error by many Brazilian fans and members of the press.

== Style of play ==
A tall and strong midfielder with a slender frame, Cerezo is regarded as one of the greatest Brazilian defensive midfielders of all time. He was well known for his tireless work-rate, stamina, tactical awareness, and his dynamic style of play. Cerezo was usually deployed in a holding role, but he was also an elegant and highly creative player who was highly regarded in the media for his technique, vision, ability to understand the game, and passing range. These traits enabled him to orchestrate attacking moves for his team, get forward, and create chances for teammates after winning back possession. As such, he often functioned as a deep-lying playmaker in midfield throughout his career. Although he was mainly a team player who preferred to assist other players over scoring himself, he also possessed an accurate shot.

== Personal life ==
Cerezo is Roman Catholic and is father of four children, including fashion model Lea T.

== Career statistics ==
=== Club ===
Club performance			League		Cup		League Cup		Continental		Total	
Season	Club	League	Apps	Goals	Apps	Goals	Apps	Goals	Apps	Goals	Apps	Goals
Japan			League		Emperor's Cup		League Cup		Asia		Total	
1972	Atlético Mineiro	Série A	3	0								
1973	Atlético Mineiro	Série A	4	0								
1973	Nacional-AM	Série A	20	3								
1974	Atlético Mineiro	Série A	5	0								
1975	Atlético Mineiro	Série A	12	0								
1976	Atlético Mineiro	Série A	19	2								
1977	Atlético Mineiro	Série A	18	0								
1978	Atlético Mineiro	Série A										
1979	Atlético Mineiro	Série A	8	1								
1980	Atlético Mineiro	Série A	19	4								
1981	Atlético Mineiro	Série A	9	3								
1982	Atlético Mineiro	Série A	3	0								
1983	Atlético Mineiro	Série A	11	2								
1983–84	Roma	Serie A	30	6								
1984–85	Roma	Serie A	22	3								
1985–86	Roma	Serie A	18	4								
1986–87	Sampdoria	Serie A	28	3								
1987–88	Sampdoria	Serie A	28	3								
1988–89	Sampdoria	Serie A	29	2								
1989–90	Sampdoria	Serie A	21	2								
1990–91	Sampdoria	Serie A	12	3								
1991–92	Sampdoria	Serie A	27	1								
1992	São Paulo	Série A										
1993	São Paulo	Série A	13	1								
1994	Cruzeiro	Série A	10	3								
1995	Paulista											
1995	São Paulo	Série A	8	0								
1996	América-MG											
1996	Atlético Mineiro	Série A										
Total	Brazil											
Total	Italy		215	27								
Career total												

=== International ===
Brazil national team
Year	Apps	Goals
1977	11	2
1978	11	0
1979	2	0
1980	6	1
1981	13	2
1982	9	0
1983	0	0
1984	0	0
1985	5	0
1986	0	0
Total	57	5

== Managerial statistics ==
Team	From	To	Record				
Team	From	To	G	W	D	L	Win %
Kashima Antlers	2000	2005	184	98	31	55	53.26
Kashima Antlers	2013	2015	88	43	16	29	48.86
Total			272	141	47	84	51.84

== Honours ==
=== Player ===
==== Club ====
Nacional

- Campeonato Amazonense: 1974

Atlético Mineiro

- Campeonato Mineiro: 1976, 1978, 1979, 1980, 1981, 1982, 1983
- Copa dos Campeões da Copa Brasil: 1978
- Campeonato Brasileiro Série A runner-up: 1977, 1980

Cruzeiro

- Campeonato Mineiro: 1984

Roma

- Coppa Italia: 1984, 1986
- European Cup runner-up: 1984

Sampdoria

- Serie A: 1990–91
- Coppa Italia: 1988, 1989
- UEFA Cup Winners' Cup: 1990
- European Cup runner-up: 1992
- Supercoppa Italiana: 1991

São Paulo

- Campeonato Paulista: 1992
- Copa Libertadores: 1993
- Supercopa Libertadores: 1993
- Recopa Sudamericana: 1993
- Intercontinental Cup: 1992, 1993

==== Individual ====
- Bola de Ouro: 1977, 1980
- Bola de Prata: 1976, 1977, 1980
- World XI (Reserve): 1979
- World Soccer World XI: 1983
- Intercontinental Cup Most Valuable Player of the Match Award: 1993
- A.S. Roma Hall of Fame: 2016

=== Manager ===
==== Club ====
Kashima Antlers

- J.League: 2000, 2001
- J.League Cup: 2000, 2002
- Emperor's Cup: 2000
- Suruga Bank Championship: 2013

Al Shabab

- UAE Football League: 2008
