= 1983–84 Coppa Italia =

Tournament details
- Country: Italy
- Dates: 21 Aug 1983 – 26 June 1984
- Teams: 48

Final positions
- Champions: Roma (5th title)
- Runners-up: Hellas Verona

Tournament statistics
- Matches played: 150
- Goals scored: 327 (2.18 per match)
- Top goal scorer: Walter Schachner (9 goals)

The 1983–84 Coppa Italia, the 37th Coppa Italia was an Italian Football Federation domestic cup competition won by Roma.

== Group stage ==
=== Group 1 ===
| Pos | Team | Pld | W | D | L | GF | GA | GD | Pts |
|---|---|---|---|---|---|---|---|---|---|
| 1 | Sampdoria | 5 | 3 | 1 | 1 | 8 | 3 | +5 | 7 |
| 2 | Triestina | 5 | 3 | 1 | 1 | 7 | 3 | +4 | 7 |
| 3 | Cremonese | 5 | 3 | 1 | 1 | 9 | 7 | +2 | 7 |
| 4 | Pistoiese | 5 | 2 | 1 | 2 | 8 | 6 | +2 | 5 |
| 5 | Pisa | 5 | 1 | 0 | 4 | 6 | 12 | −6 | 2 |
| 6 | Eccellenza | 5 | 0 | 2 | 3 | 3 | 10 | −7 | 2 |

=== Group 2 ===
| Pos | Team | Pld | W | D | L | GF | GA | GD | Pts |
|---|---|---|---|---|---|---|---|---|---|
| 1 | Juventus | 5 | 2 | 2 | 1 | 7 | 5 | +2 | 6 |
| 2 | Bari | 5 | 1 | 4 | 0 | 3 | 2 | +1 | 6 |
| 3 | Lazio | 5 | 1 | 3 | 1 | 3 | 2 | +1 | 5 |
| 4 | Catanzaro | 5 | 1 | 3 | 1 | 2 | 1 | +1 | 5 |
| 5 | Perugia | 5 | 1 | 3 | 1 | 2 | 3 | −1 | 5 |
| 6 | Taranto | 5 | 1 | 1 | 3 | 3 | 7 | −4 | 3 |

=== Group 3 ===
| Pos | Team | Pld | W | D | L | GF | GA | GD | Pts |
|---|---|---|---|---|---|---|---|---|---|
| 1 | Udinese | 5 | 3 | 2 | 0 | 9 | 5 | +4 | 8 |
| 2 | Varese | 5 | 1 | 4 | 0 | 3 | 2 | +1 | 6 |
| 3 | Bologna | 5 | 1 | 3 | 1 | 4 | 4 | 0 | 5 |
| 4 | Cavese | 5 | 1 | 3 | 1 | 6 | 7 | −1 | 5 |
| 5 | Napoli | 5 | 1 | 2 | 2 | 4 | 4 | 0 | 4 |
| 6 | Cosenza | 5 | 1 | 0 | 4 | 4 | 8 | −4 | 2 |

=== Group 4 ===
| Pos | Team | Pld | W | D | L | GF | GA | GD | Pts |
|---|---|---|---|---|---|---|---|---|---|
| 1 | Cesena | 5 | 2 | 3 | 0 | 6 | 2 | +4 | 7 |
| 2 | Avellino | 5 | 2 | 2 | 1 | 6 | 5 | +1 | 6 |
| 3 | Internazionale | 5 | 2 | 1 | 2 | 7 | 6 | +1 | 5 |
| 4 | Sambenedettese | 5 | 1 | 3 | 1 | 3 | 2 | +1 | 5 |
| 5 | Parma | 5 | 1 | 3 | 1 | 6 | 6 | 0 | 5 |
| 6 | Empoli | 5 | 1 | 0 | 4 | 2 | 9 | −7 | 2 |

=== Group 5 ===
| Pos | Team | Pld | W | D | L | GF | GA | GD | Pts |
|---|---|---|---|---|---|---|---|---|---|
| 1 | Roma | 5 | 4 | 1 | 0 | 11 | 4 | +7 | 9 |
| 2 | Milan | 5 | 3 | 2 | 0 | 8 | 2 | +6 | 8 |
| 3 | Rimini | 5 | 2 | 1 | 2 | 8 | 8 | 0 | 5 |
| 4 | Atalanta | 5 | 1 | 2 | 2 | 5 | 7 | −2 | 4 |
| 5 | Arezzo | 5 | 0 | 3 | 2 | 2 | 5 | −3 | 3 |
| 6 | Padova | 5 | 0 | 1 | 4 | 3 | 11 | −8 | 1 |

Source: https://www.rsssf.org/tablesi/italcup84.html

=== Group 6 ===
| Pos | Team | Pld | W | D | L | GF | GA | GD | Pts |
|---|---|---|---|---|---|---|---|---|---|
| 1 | Torino | 5 | 3 | 2 | 0 | 12 | 3 | +9 | 8 |
| 2 | Vicenza | 5 | 3 | 1 | 1 | 6 | 6 | 0 | 7 |
| 3 | Genoa | 5 | 2 | 2 | 1 | 8 | 6 | +2 | 6 |
| 4 | Monza | 5 | 0 | 5 | 0 | 6 | 6 | 0 | 5 |
| 5 | Palermo | 5 | 0 | 2 | 3 | 4 | 8 | −4 | 2 |
| 6 | Foggia | 5 | 0 | 2 | 3 | 2 | 9 | −7 | 2 |

=== Group 7 ===
| Pos | Team | Pld | W | D | L | GF | GA | GD | Pts |
|---|---|---|---|---|---|---|---|---|---|
| 1 | Hellas Verona | 5 | 3 | 2 | 0 | 8 | 2 | +6 | 8 |
| 2 | Reggiana | 5 | 1 | 4 | 0 | 3 | 2 | +1 | 6 |
| 3 | Campobasso | 5 | 0 | 4 | 1 | 4 | 5 | −1 | 4 |
| 4 | Cagliari | 5 | 0 | 4 | 1 | 3 | 4 | −1 | 4 |
| 5 | Carrarese | 5 | 1 | 2 | 2 | 5 | 7 | −2 | 4 |
| 6 | Catania | 5 | 1 | 2 | 2 | 3 | 6 | −3 | 4 |

=== Group 8 ===
| Pos | Team | Pld | W | D | L | GF | GA | GD | Pts |
|---|---|---|---|---|---|---|---|---|---|
| 1 | Ascoli | 5 | 4 | 1 | 0 | 12 | 5 | +7 | 9 |
| 2 | Fiorentina | 5 | 3 | 1 | 1 | 11 | 5 | +6 | 7 |
| 3 | Como | 5 | 2 | 1 | 2 | 6 | 5 | +1 | 5 |
| 4 | Lecce | 5 | 0 | 3 | 2 | 5 | 9 | −4 | 3 |
| 5 | Casertana | 5 | 1 | 1 | 3 | 4 | 9 | −5 | 3 |
| 6 | Pescara | 5 | 1 | 1 | 3 | 2 | 7 | −5 | 3 |

== Round of 16 ==
| Team 1 | Agg. | Team 2 | 1st leg | 2nd leg |
|---|---|---|---|---|
| Avellino | 1-3 | Hellas Verona | 1-0 | 0-3 (aet) |
| Cesena | 1-2 | Fiorentina | 1-1 | 0-1 |
| Juventus | 3-4 | Bari | 1-2 | 2-2 |
| Roma | 3-1 | Reggiana | 2-1 | 1-0 |
| Sampdoria | 3-2 | Ascoli | 1-0 | 2-2 |
| Triestina | 0-2 | Udinese | 0-0 | 0-2 |
| Varese | 1-3 | Torino | 1-0 | 0-3 |
| Vicenza | 1-3 | Milan | 0-1 | 1-2 |

== Quarter-finals ==
| Team 1 | Agg. | Team 2 | 1st leg | 2nd leg |
|---|---|---|---|---|
| Bari | 4-2 | Fiorentina | 2-1 | 2-1 |
| Roma | 3-2 | Milan | 1-1 | 2-1 |
| Sampdoria | 1-1 (a) | Torino | 1-1 | 0-0 |
| Udinese | 2-2 (a) | Hellas Verona | 2-1 | 0-1 |

== Semi-finals ==
| Team 1 | Agg. | Team 2 | 1st leg | 2nd leg |
|---|---|---|---|---|
| Bari | 2-5 | Hellas Verona | 1-2 | 1-3 |
| Torino | 1-4 | Roma | 1-3 | 0-1 |

== Final ==
=== First leg ===
21 June 1984
20:30

| Hellas Verona | 1–1 | Roma |
|---|---|---|
| Storgato 72' | | Cerezo 49' |

Stadio Marcantonio Bentegodi, Verona
Attendance: 30,000
Referee: Paolo Casarin

=== Second leg ===
26 June 1984
20:45

| Roma | 1–0 | Hellas Verona |
|---|---|---|
| Ferroni 27' (o.g.) |

Stadio Olimpico, Rome
Attendance: 45,101
Referee: Paolo Casarin

AS Roma won 2–1 on aggregate.

== Top goalscorers ==
| Rank | Player | Club | Goals |
|---|---|---|---|
| 1 | (Austria) Walter Schachner | Torino | 9 |
| 2 | (Italy) Maurizio Iorio | Hellas Verona | 7 |
| 3 | (Brazil) Toninho Cerezo | Roma | 6 |
| 3 | (Italy) Gabriele Messina | Bari | 6 |
| 5 | (Brazil) Juary | Ascoli | 5 |
| 5 | (Italy) Paolo Pulici | Fiorentina | 5 |
| 5 | (Italy) Francesco Vincenzi | Roma | 5 |
| 5 | (Brazil) Zico | Udinese | 5 |
| 9 | (Italy) Oscar Damiani | Milan | 4 |
| 9 | (Netherlands) Wim Kieft | Pisa | 4 |
| 9 | (Brazil) Francisco Chagas Eloia | Genoa | 4 |
