= 1991–92 Torino Calcio season =

Torino Calcio
1991–92 season
- Chairman: Gian Mauro Borsano
- Head Coach: Emiliano Mondonico
- Serie A: 3rd
- Coppa Italia: Quarter-finals
- UEFA Cup: Runners-up
- Top goalscorer: League: Enzo Scifo (9); All: Walter Casagrande (13)
- Highest home attendance: 65.377 (Ajax)
- Lowest home attendance: 5.563 (Lazio)
Home colours	Away colours

Torino Calcio enjoyed its most successful season in the 1990s, finishing third in the extremely competitive Serie A, plus nearly added the UEFA Cup to the trophy room, only missing out on away goals against Dutch side Ajax in the two-legged final.

== Squad ==
Note: Flags indicate national team as defined under FIFA eligibility rules; some limited exceptions apply. Players may hold more than one non-FIFA nationality.

Pos.	Nation	Player
GK	ITA	Luca Marchegiani
GK	ITA	Raffaele Di Fusco
GK	ITA	Luca Pastine
DF	ITA	Enrico Annoni
DF	ITA	Silvano Benedetti
DF	ITA	Pasquale Bruno
DF	ITA	Roberto Cravero
DF	ITA	Roberto Mussi
DF	ITA	Gianluca Sordo
MF	ITA	Marco Bertelli
MF	ITA	Giuseppe Carillo

Pos.	Nation	Player
MF	ITA	Sandro Cois
MF	ITA	Luca Fusi
MF	ITA	Gianluigi Lentini
MF	ESP	Rafael Martín Vázquez
MF	ITA	Roberto Policano
MF	BEL	Enzo Scifo
MF	ITA	Marco Sinaglia
MF	ITA	Giorgio Venturin
FW	ITA	Mario Perinelli
FW	ITA	Giorgio Bresciani
FW	BRA	Walter Casagrande
FW	ITA	Christian Vieri

=== Transfers ===
In
Pos.	Name	from	Type
MF	Vincenzo Scifo	Auxerre	
FW	Walter Casagrande	Ascoli	
MF	Giorgio Venturin	Napoli	loan ended
MF	Marco Sinigaglia	Como	
FW	Christian Vieri	AC Prato	
GK	Luca Pastine	Massese	
MF	Marco Bertelli	Carrarese	
MF	Alvise Zago	Pescara	loan ended
FW	Benito Carbone	Reggina	loan ended

Out
Pos.	Name	To	Type
GK	Franco Tancredi		retired
FW	Haris Škoro	FC Zürich	
MF	Dino Baggio	Juventus	
DF	Giuseppe Pancaro	Avezzano	
DF	Daniele Delli Carri	Lucchese	loan
FW	Benito Carbone	Casertana	loan
MF	Francesco Romano	Venezia	
GK	Paolo Toccafondi	Prato	
DF	Gianluca Atzori	Ternana	
DF	Davide Mezzanotti	Pro Sesto	
MF	Marcello Albino	Pro Sesto	
MF	Giuseppe Carillo	Venezia	
MF	Alvise Zago	Pisa	loan
FW	Alessandro Brunetti	Lucchese	

== Competitions ==
=== Serie A ===
==== League table ====
Pos	Team	Pld	W	D	L	GF	GA	GD	Pts	Qualification or relegation
1	Milan (C)	34	22	12	0	74	21	+53	56	Qualification to European Cup
2	Juventus	34	18	12	4	45	22	+23	48	Qualification to UEFA Cup
3	Torino	34	14	15	5	42	20	+22	43	Qualification to UEFA Cup
4	Napoli	34	15	12	7	56	40	+16	42	Qualification to UEFA Cup
5	Roma	34	13	14	7	37	31	+6	40	Qualification to UEFA Cup

Source: 1991–92 Serie A, RSSSF.com
Rules for classification: 1) Points; 2) Head-to-head points; 3) Head-to-head goal difference; 4) Goal difference; 5) Goals scored; 6) Draw.
(C) Champions

==== Results by round ====
Round	1	2	3	4	5	6	7	8	9	10	11	12	13	14	15	16	17	18	19	20	21	22	23	24	25	26	27	28	29	30	31	32	33	34
Ground	H	A	H	A	A	H	A	H	A	H	A	H	A	H	A	H	A	A	H	A	H	H	A	H	A	H	A	H	A	H	A	H	A	H
Result	D	L	W	D	W	W	D	D	D	L	D	D	L	W	D	D	W	W	L	W	W	W	D	L	D	D	W	W	D	D	D	W	W	W
Position	7	12	9	11	6	2	3	3	4	7	9	7	12	8	6	7	5	4	7	5	5	5	4	4	4	4	4	4	4	4	4	4	3	3

Source: Competitive matches
A = Away; H = Home; W = Win; D = Draw; L = Loss; = Leader, 1992–93 UEFA Champions League; = 1992–93 UEFA Cup; = 1992–93 Serie B

==== Matches ====
1 September 1991 1	Bari	1–1	Torino	Bari
16:00 UTC+2	Platt 26' (pen.)	Report	20' Mussi	Stadium: della Vittoria; Attendance: 44 595; Referee: Stafoggia

8 September 1991 2	Torino	0–1	Lazio	Turin
16:00 UTC+2		Report	76' Sosa	Stadium: delle Alpi; Attendance: 33.520; Referee: Baldas (Trieste)

15 September 1991 3	Cremonese	0–2	Torino	Cremona
16:00 UTC+2		Report	74' Venturin; 85' Scifo	Stadium: Stadio Giovanni Zini; Attendance: 14.779; Referee: Ceccarini (Livorno)

22 September 1991 4	Torino	0–0	Napoli	Turin
15:00 UTC+2		Report		Stadium: delle Alpi; Attendance: 39.324; Referee: Lo Bello (Siracusa)

29 September 1991 5	Cagliari	0–1	Torino	Cagliari
15:00 UTC+1		Report	69' Scifo	Stadium: Stadio Sant'Elia; Attendance: 19.818; Referee: Felicani (Bologna)

6 October 1991 6	Torino	3–1	Foggia	Turin
15:00 UTC+1	Policano 17'; Scifo 28' (pen.); Lentini 54'	Report	81' Baiano	Stadium: delle Alpi; Attendance: 36.955; Referee: Luci (Florence)

20 October 1991 7	Torino	1–1	Roma	Turin
15:00 UTC+1	Bresciani 23'	Report	58' Aldair	Stadium: delle Alpi; Attendance: 33.492; Referee: Pezzella (Frattamaggiore)

27 October 1991 8	Parma	0–0	Torino	Parma
14:30 UTC+1		Report		Stadium: Stadio Ennio Tardini; Attendance: 22.081; Referee: Bazzoli (Merano)

3 November 1991 9	Torino	0–0	Internazionale	Turin
14:30 UTC+1		Report		Stadium: delle Alpi; Attendance: 39.953; Referee: Beschin (Legnago)

17 November 1991 10	Juventus	1–0	Torino	Turin
14:30 UTC+1	Casiraghi 11'	Report		Stadium: delle Alpi; Attendance: 58.607; Referee: Ceccarini (Livorno)

24 November 1991 11	Torino	0–0	Verona	Turin
14:30 UTC+1		Report		Stadium: delle Alpi; Attendance: 30.007; Referee: Cesari (Genoa)

1 December 1991 12	Sampdoria	0–0	Torino	Genoa
14:30 UTC+1		Report		Stadium: Stadio Luigi Ferraris; Attendance: 29.274; Referee: Fabricatore (Rome)

8 December 1991 13	Milan	2–0	Torino	Milan
14:30 UTC+1	Gullit 18'; Massaro 47'	Report		Stadium: Stadio Giuseppe Meazza; Attendance: 70.452; Referee: D'Elia (Salerno)

15 December 1991 14	Torino	2–0	Fiorentina	Turin
14:30 UTC+1	Lentini 30'; Scifo 58'	Report		Stadium: delle Alpi; Attendance: 30.118; Referee: Lo Bello (Siracusa)

5 January 1992 15	Genoa	1–1	Torino	Genoa
14:30 UTC+1	Aguilera 85'	Report	60' Casagrande	Stadium: Stadio Luigi Ferraris; Attendance: 34.013; Referee: Cinciripini (Ascoli Piceno)

12 January 1992 16	Torino	1–1	Atalanta	Turin
14:30 UTC+1	Policano 45'	Report	83' Piovanelli	Stadium: delle Alpi; Attendance: 31 559; Referee: Bazzoli (Merano)

19 January 1992 17	Ascoli	0–4	Torino	Ascoli Piceno
14:30 UTC+1		Report	8' (o.g.) Marcato; 29' Lentini; 48' Policano; 81' (pen.) Bresciani	Stadium: Stadio Cino e Lillo Del Duca; Attendance: 7.540; Referee: Scaramuzza (Mestre)

26 January 1992 18	Torino	1–0	Bari	Turin
14:30 UTC+1	Cravero 86'	Report		Stadium: delle Alpi; Attendance: 29.976; Referee: Cesari (Genoa)

2 February 1992 19	Lazio	2–1	Torino	Rome
14:30 UTC+1	Sosa 28' (pen.); Sclosa 41'	Report	39' Annoni	Stadium: Stadio Olimpico; Attendance: 35.791; Referee: Boggi (Salerno)

9 February 1992 20	Torino	2–0	Cremonese	Turin
15:00 UTC+1	Casagrande 8'; Scifo 85' (pen.)	Report		Stadium: delle Alpi; Attendance: 29.788; Referee: Fucci (Salerno)

16 February 1992 21	Napoli	0–1	Torino	Naples
15:00 UTC+1		Report	79' Fusi	Stadium: Stadio San Paolo; Attendance: 53.502; Referee: Collina (Viareggio)

23 February 1992 22	Torino	1–0	Cagliari	Turin
15:00 UTC+1	Policano 60'	Report		Stadium: delle Alpi; Attendance: 34.379; Referee: Felicani (Bologna)

1 March 1992 23	Foggia	1–1	Torino	Foggia
15:00 UTC+1	Kolyvanov 78'	Report	43' (pen.) Scifo	Stadium: Stadio Pino Zaccheria; Attendance: 14.702; Referee: Mughetti (Cesena)

8 March 1992 24	Roma	1–0	Torino	Rome
15:00 UTC+1	Pellegrini 88'	Report		Stadium: Stadio Olimpico; Attendance: 47.376; Referee: Amendolia (Messina)

15 March 1992 25	Torino	0–0	Parma	Turin
15:00 UTC+1		Report		Stadium: delle Alpi; Attendance: 37.950; Referee: Sguizzato (Verona)

28 March 1992 26	Internazionale	0–0	Torino	Milan
16:00 UTC+1		Report		Stadium: Stadio Giuseppe Meazza; Attendance: 50.593; Referee: Stafoggia (Pesaro)

5 April 1992 27	Torino	2–0	Juventus	Turin
16:00 UTC+2	Casagrande 66', 73'	Report		Stadium: delle Alpi; Attendance: 45.490; Referee: Baldas (Trieste)

11 April 1992 28	Hellas Verona	1–2	Torino	Verona
16:00 UTC+2	Răducioiu 44'	Report	31' Scifo; 77' Lentini	Stadium: Stadio Marcantonio Bentegodi; Attendance: 16.620; Referee: Bazzoli (Merano)

18 April 1992 29	Torino	1–1	Sampdoria	Turin
16:00 UTC+2	Casagrande 17'	Report	39' Katanec	Stadium: delle Alpi; Attendance: 38.830; Referee: D'Elia (Salerno)

25 April 1992 30	Torino	2–2	Milan	Turin
16:00 UTC+2	Casagrande 8'; Ancelotti 62' (o.g.)	Report	18' Massaro; 72' Fuser	Stadium: delle Alpi; Attendance: 42.866; Referee: Pezzella (Frattamaggiore)

3 May 1992 31	Fiorentina	0–0	Torino	Firenze
16:00 UTC+2		Report		Stadium: Stadio Comunale; Attendance: 29.412; Referee: Brignoccoli (Ancona)

9 May 1992 32	Torino	4–0	Genoa	Turin
16:00 UTC+2	Bresciani 17'; Scifo 60'; Vieri 72'; Policano 79'	Report		Stadium: delle Alpi; Attendance: 39.185; Referee: Lanese (Messina)

17 May 1992 33	Atalanta	1–3	Torino	Bergamo
16:30 UTC+2	Caniggia 61'	Report	31' Bresciani; 38' Scifo; 73' Bruno	Stadium: Stadio Comunale; Attendance: 19.421; Referee: Arena (Ercolano)

24 May 1992 34	Torino	5–2	Ascoli	Turin
16:30 UTC+2	Sordo 6'; Benedetti 12'; Martín Vázquez 40'; Pierleoni 59' (o.g.); Lentini 74'	Report	35' Maniero; 82' Zaini	Stadium: delle Alpi; Attendance: 42.046; Referee: Dinelli (Lucca)

=== Topscorers ===
- (Belgium) Enzo Scifo 9
- (Brazil) (Brazil) Walter Casagrande 6
- (Italy) Gianluigi Lentini 5
- (Italy) Roberto Policano 5
- (Italy) Giorgio Bresciani 4

=== Coppa Italia ===
Second round

28 August 1991	Torino	4–1	Ancona	Turin
20:30 UTC+2	Lentini 27', 56'; Casagrande 63' (pen.); Bresciani 87'		3' Bertarelli	Stadium: Delle Alpi; Attendance: 6 407; Referee: Mughetti

4 September 1991	Ancona	1–1	Torino	Ancona
20:45 UTC+2	Tovalieri 14' (pen.)		75' Venturin	Stadium: Dorico; Referee: Arena

Eightfinals

30 October 1991	Torino	2–0	Lazio	Turin
20:30 UTC+1	Annoni 34'; Vieri 43'			Stadium: Stadio delle Alpi; Attendance: 5.563; Referee: Lo Bello

4 December 1991	Lazio	0–0	Torino	Rome
20:30 UTC+1				Stadium: Olimpico; Attendance: 30.000; Referee: Amendolia

Quarterfinals

11 February 1992	Milan	2–0	Torino	Milan
20:30 UTC+1	Baresi 30'; Simone 53'			Stadium: Giuseppe Meazza; Attendance: 7.624; Referee: Ceccarini

26 February 1992	Torino	1–1 (1–3 agg.)	A.C. Milan	Turin
20:30 UTC+1	Lentini 79'		23' (o.g.) Bruno	Stadium: delle Alpi; Attendance: 23 105; Referee: Luci

=== UEFA Cup ===
Second round

19 September 1991	(Iceland) KR Reykjavik	0–2	Torino	Reykjavík
20:30 UTC+0		Report	20' Mussi; 73' Annoni	Stadium: KR-völlur; Attendance: 2 100; Referee: (Northern Ireland) McKnight

2 October 1991	Torino	6–1	(Iceland) KR Reykjavik	Turin
20:30 UTC+1	Bresciani 14'; Policano 44'; Martín Vázquez 47'; Scifo 51', 63'; Carillo 53'	Report	16' Skulasson	Stadium: delle Alpi; Attendance: 13.081; Referee: (Socialist Federal Republic of Yugoslavia) Colic

Third round

24 October 1991	Torino	2–0	(Portugal) Boavista	Turin
20:30 UTC+1	Lentini 2'; Annoni 69'	Report		Stadium: delle Alpi; Attendance: 41 186; Referee: (England) Hackett

6 November 1991	(Portugal) Boavista	0–0	Torino	Porto
21:30 UTC+0		Report		Stadium: Estadio do Bessa; Attendance: 11,000; Referee: (Sweden) Karlsson

Eightfinals

27 November 1991	(Greece) AEK Athens	2–2	Torino	Athens
19:30 UTC+2	Batista 21'; Šabanadžović 73'	Report	33' Casagrande; 36' Bresciani	Stadium: Nikos Goumas; Attendance: 33 000; Referee: (Germany) Schmidhuber

11 December 1991	Torino	1–0	(Greece) AEK Athens	Turin
20:30 UTC+1	Casagrande 55'	Report		Stadium: Stadio delle Alpi; Attendance: 34 147; Referee: (Belgium) Goethals

Quarterfinals

4 March 1992	(Denmark) B 1903	0–2	Torino	Copenhagen
18:00 UTC+1		Report	37' Casagrande; 81' Policano	Stadium: Gentofte; Attendance: 14 800; Referee: (Bulgaria) Spassov

19 March 1992 Gara di ritorno	Torino	1–0	(Denmark) B 1903	Turin
20:30 UTC+1	Nielsen 30' (o.g.)	Report		Stadium: Stadio delle Alpi; Attendance: 28 577; Referee: (Scotland) Waddell

Semifinals

1 April 1992	(Spain) Real Madrid	2–1	Torino	Madrid
21:00 UTC+2	Hagi 61'; Hierro 66'	Report	58' Casagrande	Stadium: Santiago Bernabéu; Attendance: 62 876; Referee: (Austria) Forstinger

15 April 1992	Torino	2–0	(Spain) Real Madrid	Turin
20:30 UTC+2	Rocha 7' (o.g.); Fusi 76'	Report		Stadium: delle Alpi; Attendance: 59 861; Referee: (Czech Republic) Galler

==== Final ====
29 April 1992	Torino	2–2	(Netherlands) Ajax	Torino
20:30 UTC+2	Casagrande 62', 84'	Report	14' Jonk; 75' (pen.) Pettersson	Stadium: delle Alpi; Attendance: 65 377; Referee: (England) Worrall

13 May 1992	(Netherlands) Ajax	0–0 (2–2a agg.)	Torino	Amsterdam
20:30 UTC+2		Report		Stadium: Olympic; Attendance: 42 000; Referee: (Socialist Federal Republic of Yugoslavia) Petrović

== Statistics ==
=== Players statistics ===
No.	Pos	Nat	Player	Total		1991–92 Serie A		1991–92 Coppa Italia		1991–92 UEFA Cup	
No.	Pos	Nat	Player	Apps	Goals	Apps	Goals	Apps	Goals	Apps	Goals
-	GK	(Italy) ITA	Luca Marchegiani	33	-19	32+1	-19				
-	DF	(Italy) ITA	Roberto Mussi	25	1	20+5	1				
-	DF	(Italy) ITA	Enrico Annoni	29	1	26+3	1				
-	DF	(Italy) ITA	Roberto Cravero	24	1	22+2	1				
-	DF	(Italy) ITA	Silvano Benedetti	25	1	23+2	1				
-	MF	(Spain) ESP	Rafael Martín Vázquez	28	1	21+7	1				
-	MF	(Belgium) BEL	Enzo Scifo	30	9	27+3	9				
-	MF	(Italy) ITA	Giorgio Venturin	32	1	26+6	1				
-	MF	(Italy) ITA	Luca Fusi	31	1	30+1	1				
-	MF	(Italy) ITA	Gianluigi Lentini	33	5	33	5				
-	FW	(Brazil) BRA	Walter Casagrande	23	6	16+7	6				
-	GK	(Italy) ITA	Raffaele Di Fusco	3	-1	1+2	-1				
-	MF	(Italy) ITA	Roberto Policano	23	5	20+3	5				
-	DF	(Italy) ITA	Pasquale Bruno	22	1	19+3	1				
-	FW	(Italy) ITA	Giorgio Bresciani	26	4	16+10	4				
-	DF	(Italy) ITA	Gianluca Sordo	20	1	11+9	1				
-	MF	(Italy) ITA	Sandro Cois	10	0	2+8	0				
-	MF	(Italy) ITA	Giuseppe Carillo	4	0	1+3	0				
-	FW	(Italy) ITA	Christian Vieri	6	1	0+6	1				
-	MF	(Italy) ITA	Marco Sinaglia	2	0	0+2	0				
-	GK	(Italy) ITA	Luca Pastine	0	0	0	0				
-	MF	(Italy) ITA	Marco Bertelli	0	0	0	0				
-	FW	(Italy) ITA	Di Maggio	0	0	0	0				

- Source: http://calcio-seriea.net/presenze/1991/1019/

== Sources ==
- RSSSF - Italy 1991/92
