= 1987–88 Torino Calcio season =

Torino Calcio
1987–88 season
- President: Mario Gerbi
- Head Coach: Luigi Radice
- Serie A: 7th place
- Coppa Italia: Final
- Top goalscorer: League: Anton Polster (9); All: Polster (14)
- Highest home attendance: 54,860 vs. Juventus (3 January 1988)
- Lowest home attendance: 17,146 vs. Empoli (13 December 1987)
- All statistics correct as of 24 May 1988.

== Season summary ==
Between the end of spring and the beginning of summer, Torino changed his chairman: Mario Gerbi replaced Sergio Rossi. Foreign contingent was also substituted, with Anton Polster and Klaus Berggreen called to do not make regret Wim Kieft and Leo Junior.

Polster copied the former striker, throwing several balls in net during his initial appearances. Torino knocked out the citizen rivals in domestic cup but lost the final in face of Sampdoria. En other, Juventus got a heavier revenge: due to equal points in league (31) it needs a play-off for last UEFA Cup spot, awarded in a match that "bianconeri" won on shoot-out.

== Squad ==
=== Goalkeepers ===
- (Italy) Fabrizio Lorieri
- (Italy) Alessandro Zaninelli

=== Defenders ===
- (Italy) Silvano Benedetti
- (Italy) Giancarlo Corradini
- (Italy) Roberto Cravero
- (Italy) Riki De Bin
- (Italy) Giacomo Ferri
- (Italy) Ezio Rossi

=== Midfielders ===
- (Denmark) Klaus Berggreen
- (Italy) Antonio Comi
- (Italy) Massimo Crippa
- (Italy) Diego Fuser
- (Italy) Gianluigi Lentini
- (Italy) Antonio Sabato

=== Attackers ===
- (Austria) Anton Polster
- (Italy) Giorgio Bresciani
- (Italy) Tullio Gritti

== Competitions ==
=== Serie A ===
==== League table ====
Pos	Team	Pld	W	D	L	GF	GA	GD	Pts	Qualification or relegation
5	Internazionale	30	11	10	9	42	35	+7	32	Qualification to UEFA Cup
6	Juventus (Note: Juventus won the UEFA Cup qualification match against Torino 0–0*(4:2) then qualified to 1988–89 UEFA Cup.)	30	11	9	10	35	30	+5	31	Qualification to UEFA Cup
7	Torino	30	8	15	7	33	30	+3	31	
8	Fiorentina	30	9	10	11	29	33	−4	28	
9	Cesena	30	7	12	11	23	32	−9	26	

Source: 1987–88 Serie A, RSSSF.com
Rules for classification: 1) Points; 2) Head-to-head points; 3) Head-to-head goal difference; 4) Goal difference; 5) Goals scored; 6) Draw.

==== Matches ====
13 September 1987 1	Avellino	2–1	Torino	Avellino
	Schachner 34'; Bertoni 77'	Report	Polster 48'	Stadium: Partenio

20 September 1987 2	Torino	4–1	Sampdoria	Turin
	Polster 6', 46', 82'; Rossi 36'	Report	Vialli 87'	Stadium: Comunale

27 September 1987 3	Ascoli	3–0	Torino	Ascoli Piceno
	Scarafoni 19'; Giovannelli 48' (pen.); Carannante 89'	Report		Stadium: Cino e Lillo Del Duca

4 October 1987 4	Torino	1–1	Inter	Turin
	Ferri 55'	Report	Matteoli 62'	Stadium: Comunale

11 October 1987 5	Cesena	0–0	Torino	Cesena
		Report		Stadium: Dino Manuzzi

25 October 1987 6	Torino	2–1	Fiorentina	Turin
	Polster 22', 67'	Report	Baggio 72' (pen.)	Stadium: Comunale

1 November 1987 7	Milan	0–0	Torino	Milan
		Report		Stadium: San Siro

8 November 1987 8	Torino	1–1	Hellas Verona	Turin
	Cravero 78'	Report	Paccione 27'	Stadium: Comunale

22 November 1987 9	Napoli	3–1	Torino	Naples
	Maradona 3'; Careca 44', 90'	Report	Berggreen 76'	Stadium: San Paolo

29 November 1987 10	Pescara	2–2	Torino	Pescara
	Sliskovic 45' (pen.), 57'	Report	Polster 12'; Gritti 65'	Stadium: Adriatico

13 December 1987 11	Torino	0–1	Empoli	Turin
		Report	Della Scala 40'	Stadium: Comunale

20 December 1987 12	Como	0–0	Torino	Como
		Report		Stadium: Giuseppe Sinigaglia

3 January 1988 13	Torino	2–2	Juventus	Turin
	Crippa 40'; Gritti 66'	Report	Alessio 57'; Rossi 84' (o.g.)	Stadium: Comunale

10 January 1988 14	Roma	1–1	Torino	Rome
	Völler 55'	Report	Gritti 78'	Stadium: Olimpico

17 January 1988 15	Torino	3–1	Pisa	Turin
	Gritti 12', 56'; Berggreen 46'	Report	Lucarelli 6'	Stadium: Comunale

24 January 1988 16	Torino	0–0	Avellino	Turin
		Report		Stadium: Comunale

31 January 1988 17	Sampdoria	1–1	Torino	Genoa
	Mannini 33'	Report	Comi 44'	Stadium: Luigi Ferraris

7 February 1988 18	Torino	2–1	Ascoli	Turin
	Comi 39'; Crippa 65'	Report	Greco 84' (pen.)	Stadium: Comunale

14 February 1988 19	Inter	0–1	Torino	Milan
		Report	Cravero 12' (pen.)	Stadium: Giuseppe Meazza

28 February 1988 20	Torino	2–2	Cesena	Turin
	Cravero 70' (pen.); Bresciani 86'	Report	Lorenzo 12'; Di Bartolomei 45' (pen.)	Stadium: Comunale

6 March 1988 21	Fiorentina	1–0	Torino	Florence
	Diaz 90' (pen.)	Report		Stadium: Comunale

13 March 1988 22	Torino	1–1	Milan	Turin
	Bresciani 77'	Report	Ancelotti 78'	Stadium: Comunale

20 March 1988 23	Hellas Verona	0–2	Torino	Verona
		Report	Rossi 8'; Gritti 47'	Stadium: Marcantonio Bentegodi

27 March 1988 24	Torino	0–0	Napoli	Turin
		Report		Stadium: Comunale

10 April 1988 25	Torino	2–0	Pescara	Turin
	Berggreen 52'; Polster 62'	Report		Stadium: Comunale

17 April 1988 26	Empoli	0–0	Torino	Empoli
		Report		Stadium: Carlo Castellani

24 April 1988 27	Torino	1–1	Como	Turin
	Comi 52'	Report	Giunta 45'	Stadium: Comunale

1 May 1988 28	Juventus	2–1	Torino	Turin
	Tricella 29'; Rush 88'	Report	Polster 43'	Stadium: Comunale

8 May 1988 29	Torino	2–0	Roma	Turin
	Gritti 54'; Crippa 88'	Report		Stadium: Comunale

15 May 1988 30	Pisa	2–0	Torino	Pisa
	Faccenda 8', 67'	Report		Stadium: Arena Garibaldi

=== Topscorers ===
- (Austria) Anton Polster 9
- (Italy) Tullio Gritti 7
- (Italy) Antonio Comi 3
- (Italy) Roberto Cravero 3
- (Italy) Massimo Crippa 3

==== UEFA Cup qualification ====
23 May 1988	Juventus	0–0 (a.e.t.) (4–2 p)	Torino	Stadio Comunale Vittorio Pozzo, Turin
				Referee: Pietro D'Elia (Salerno)
	Penalties
	Vignola (penalty scored); De Agostini (penalty scored); Brio (penalty missed); Cabrini (penalty scored); Rush (penalty scored)		(penalty scored) Cravero; (penalty scored) Bresciani; (penalty missed) Comi; (penalty missed) Benedetti

Juventus qualified for 1988–89 UEFA Cup.

=== Coppa Italia ===
First round

23 August 1987 1	Cosenza	0–1	Torino	Cosenza
20:30 UTC+2			62' Gritti	Stadium: Stadio San Vito; Attendance: 14 218; Referee: Luci

26 August 1987 2	Torino	2–1	Atalanta	Turin
20:30 UTC+2	Polster 4'; Gritti 56'		14' Nicolini	Stadium: Stadio Comunale Vittorio Pozzo; Attendance: 18.376; Referee: Amendolia

30 August 1987 3	Arezzo	1–5	Torino	Arezzo
20:30 UTC+2	Tovalieri 77'		2' Gritti; 60' E. Rossi; 74', 78' Polster; 89' Bresciani	Stadium: Comunale; Attendance: 4.100; Referee: Fabricatore (Rome)

2 September 1987 4	Vicenza	0–1	Torino	Vicenza
20:30 UTC+2			50' Polster	Stadium: Stadio Romeo Menti; Attendance: 6.957; Referee: Frigerio (Milan)

6 September 1987 5	Torino	0–2	Sampdoria	Turin
20:30 UTC+2			60', 90' (pen.) Vialli	Stadium: Comunale; Attendance: 20 245; Referee: Agnolin

Eightfinals

6 January 1988	Verona	1–0	Torino	Verona
14:30 UTC+1	Elkjaer 62'			Stadium: Stadio Marcantonio Bentegodi; Attendance: 16.500; Referee: Luci

20 January 1988	Torino	1–0 (3–1 p)	Verona	Turin
18:00 UTC+1	Benedetti 5'			Stadium: Comunale; Attendance: 10.000; Referee: Longhi
	Penalties
	Cravero (penalty scored); Polster (penalty missed); Bresciani (penalty scored); Benedetti (penalty scored)		(penalty scored) Verza; (penalty missed) Galia; (penalty missed) Volpecina; (penalty missed) Berthold

Quarterfinals

10 February 1988	Torino	1–1	Napoli	Turin
20:30 UTC+1	Comi 4'		9' Renica	Stadium: Stadio Comunale Vittorio Pozzo; Attendance: 35.974; Referee: Casarin

2 March 1988	Napoli	2–3	Torino	Naples
20:30 UTC+1	Maradona 37', 50'		28' Gritti; 75' Comi; 80' Polster	Stadium: San Paolo; Attendance: 40.784; Referee: Bergamo

Semifinals

6 April 1988	Torino	2–0	Juventus	Turin
20:30 UTC+2	Gritti 56'; E. Rossi 68'			Stadium: Stadio Comunale Vittorio Pozzo; Attendance: 39.900; Referee: Casarin

20 April 1988	Juventus	2–1	Torino	Turin
20:30 UTC+2	Brio 55'; De Agostini 63' (pen.)		19' (o.g.) De Agostini	Stadium: Comunale; Attendance: 39.500; Referee: D'Elia

Final

5 May 1988	Sampdoria	2–0	Torino	Genoa
16:00 UTC+2	Briegel 10'; Vialli 32'			Stadium: Stadio Luigi Ferraris; Attendance: 17.236; Referee: Casarin

19 May 1988	Torino	2–1 (a.e.t.) (2–3a agg.)	Sampdoria	Turin
20:30 UTC+2	Vierchowod 5' (o.g.); A. Paganin 35' (o.g.)		112' Salsano	Stadium: Comunale; Attendance: 33 000; Referee: Agnolin

== Sources ==
- RSSSF – Italy 1987/88
