= 1992 UEFA Cup final =

- Event: 1991–92 UEFA Cup
Torino	Ajax
(Italy)	(Netherlands)
2	2
- on aggregate Ajax won on away goals

First leg
Torino	Ajax
2	2
- Date: 29 April 1992
- Venue: Stadio delle Alpi, Turin
- Referee: Joe Worrall (England)
- Attendance: 65,377

Second leg
Ajax	Torino
0	0
- Date: 13 May 1992
- Venue: Olympic Stadium, Amsterdam
- Referee: Zoran Petrović (Yugoslavia)
- Attendance: 42,000

The 1992 UEFA Cup final was played on 29 April 1992 and 13 May 1992 between Ajax of the Netherlands and Torino of Italy. Ajax won on away goals after a 2–2 draw in the first leg in Turin and a 0–0 draw in the second in Amsterdam. The victory made Ajax only the second club—after Torino's city rivals Juventus—to have won all three major European trophies at the time (European Cup/UEFA Champions League, UEFA Cup/UEFA Europa League, and UEFA Cup Winners' Cup).

== Route to the final ==
As punishment for hooliganism from Ajax supporters, UEFA ordered a temporary relocation of Ajax's home matches, requiring them to be played at least 200 kilometers away from Amsterdam. As a result, for the first three rounds of the competition, Ajax played their 'home' legs at the Rheinstadion in Düsseldorf, Germany. Despite this disadvantage, the Dutch side were still able to qualify for the final without ever truly facing serious threat of elimination.

Ajax				Round	Torino			
Opponent	Agg.	1st leg	2nd leg		Opponent	Agg.	1st leg	2nd leg
(Sweden) Örebro SK	4–0	3–0 (N)	1–0 (A)	First round	(Iceland) KR	8–1	2–0 (A)	6–1 (H)
(Germany) (Note: Erfurt qualified for the 1991–92 UEFA Cup by finishing 3rd in the 1990–91 NOFV-Oberliga, East Germany's top football league. Following German reunification, Erfurt had joined the 2. Bundesliga (run by the DFB, formerly of West Germany) for the '91–'92 season.) Rot-Weiß Erfurt	5–1	2–1 (A)	3–0 (N)	Second round	(Portugal) Boavista	2–0	2–0 (H)	0–0 (A)
(Spain) Osasuna	2–0	1–0 (A)	1–0 (N)	Third round	(Greece) AEK Athens	3–2	2–2 (A)	1–0 (H)
(Belgium) Gent	3–0	0–0 (A)	3–0 (H)	Quarter-finals	(Denmark) B 1903	3–0	2–0 (A)	1–0 (H)
(Italy) Genoa	4–3	3–2 (A)	1–1 (H)	Semi-finals	(Spain) Real Madrid	3–2	1–2 (A)	2–0 (H)

== Match details ==
=== First leg ===
29 April 1992

Torino (Italy)	2–2	(Netherlands) Ajax
Casagrande 62', 82'	Report	Jonk 14'; Pettersson 73' (pen.)

Stadio delle Alpi, Turin
Attendance: 65,377
Referee: Joe Worrall (England)

Torino	Ajax

GK	1	(Italy) Luca Marchegiani
DF	2	(Italy) Pasquale Bruno
DF	6	(Italy) Roberto Cravero (c)	(substituted off) 80'
DF	5	(Italy) Silvano Benedetti
DF	4	(Italy) Enrico Annoni
MF	10	(Spain) Rafael Martín Vázquez
MF	11	(Italy) Giorgio Venturin
MF	7	(Belgium) Enzo Scifo
MF	3	(Italy) Roberto Mussi	(substituted off) 83'
MF	8	(Italy) Gianluigi Lentini
FW	9	(Brazil) Walter Casagrande
Substitutes:
GK	12	(Italy) Raffaele Di Fusco
MF	13	(Italy) Gianluca Sordo		(substituted on) 83'
MF	14	(Italy) Sandro Cois
FW	15	(Italy) Giorgio Bresciani		(substituted on) 80'
FW	16	(Italy) Christian Vieri
Manager:
(Italy) Emiliano Mondonico

GK	1	(Netherlands) Stanley Menzo
DF	2	(Netherlands) Danny Blind (c)
DF	5	(Netherlands) Frank de Boer
DF	8	(Netherlands) Michel Kreek
DF	3	(Netherlands) Sonny Silooy
MF	4	(Netherlands) Wim Jonk
MF	6	(Netherlands) Aron Winter
MF	7	(Netherlands) John van 't Schip
FW	10	(Netherlands) Dennis Bergkamp
FW	11	(Netherlands) Bryan Roy	(substituted off) 82'
FW	9	(Sweden) Stefan Pettersson
Substitutes:
GK	12	(Netherlands) Edwin van der Sar
MF	14	(Netherlands) Marciano Vink
FW	15	(Netherlands) John van Loen
MF	16	(Netherlands) Alfons Groenendijk	(substituted on) 82'
MF	17	(Netherlands) Rob Alflen
Manager:
(Netherlands) Louis van Gaal

=== Second leg ===
13 May 1992

Ajax (Netherlands)	0–0	(Italy) Torino
	Report

Olympisch Stadion, Amsterdam
Attendance: 42,000
Referee: Zoran Petrović (Yugoslavia)

Ajax	Torino

GK	1	(Netherlands) Stanley Menzo
DF	2	(Netherlands) Danny Blind (c)
DF	8	(Netherlands) Michel Kreek	(substituted off) 80'
DF	5	(Netherlands) Frank de Boer
DF	3	(Netherlands) Sonny Silooy
MF	4	(Netherlands) Wim Jonk
MF	6	(Netherlands) Aron Winter
MF	7	(Netherlands) John van 't Schip
MF	10	(Netherlands) Rob Alflen
FW	11	(Netherlands) Bryan Roy	(substituted off) 65'
FW	9	(Sweden) Stefan Pettersson
Substitutes:
GK	12	(Netherlands) Edwin van der Sar
MF	14	(Netherlands) Marciano Vink		(substituted on) 80'
FW	15	(Netherlands) John van Loen		(substituted on) 65'
MF	16	(Netherlands) Alfons Groenendijk
FW	17	(Denmark) Dan Petersen
Manager:
(Netherlands) Louis van Gaal

GK	1	(Italy) Luca Marchegiani
DF	2	(Italy) Roberto Mussi
DF	6	(Italy) Roberto Cravero (c)	(substituted off) 58'
DF	4	(Italy) Luca Fusi
DF	5	(Italy) Silvano Benedetti
MF	10	(Spain) Rafael Martín Vázquez
MF	11	(Italy) Giorgio Venturin
MF	7	(Belgium) Enzo Scifo	(substituted off) 62'
MF	3	(Italy) Roberto Policano
MF	8	(Italy) Gianluigi Lentini
FW	9	(Brazil) Walter Casagrande
Substitutes:
GK	12	(Italy) Raffaele Di Fusco
MF	13	(Italy) Sandro Cois
MF	14	(Italy) Gianluca Sordo	(substituted on) 58'
FW	15	(Italy) Christian Vieri
FW	16	(Italy) Giorgio Bresciani	(substituted on) 62'
Manager:
(Italy) Emiliano Mondonico

== See also ==
- 1992 European Cup final
- 1992 European Cup Winners' Cup final
- AFC Ajax in European football
- Torino FC in European football
