= Luciano Piquè =

Italian footballer (1935–2021)

Personal information
- Date of birth: 10 June 1935
- Place of birth: Venice, Italy
- Date of death: 2 November 2021 (aged 86)
- Height: 1.77 m (5 ft 10 in)
- Position: Midfielder

Youth career
- 1951–1953: Favaro

Senior career*
Years	Team	Apps	(Gls)
1953–1955	Mestre		
1955–1959	Udinese		
1959–1961	Genoa		
1961–1962	Padova	8	(0)
1963–1964	Savona		
1964–1967	Virtus Entella		
1967–1969	Alassio		

Managerial career
- Alassio (player-manager)
- Canelli
- Omegna
- 1979–1980: Pro Vercelli
- 1980–1981: Omegna
- * Club domestic league appearances and goals

Luciano Piquè (10 June 1935 – 2 November 2021) was an Italian professional footballer who played as a midfielder for Udinese, Genoa, Savona and Virtus Entella.

== Managerial career ==
Having managed lower-league side Alassio while he played for them, Piquè would go on to manage at Canelli and Omegna, before taking charge of Pro Vercelli for the 1979–80 Serie D season.
