= List of international goals scored by Toni Polster =

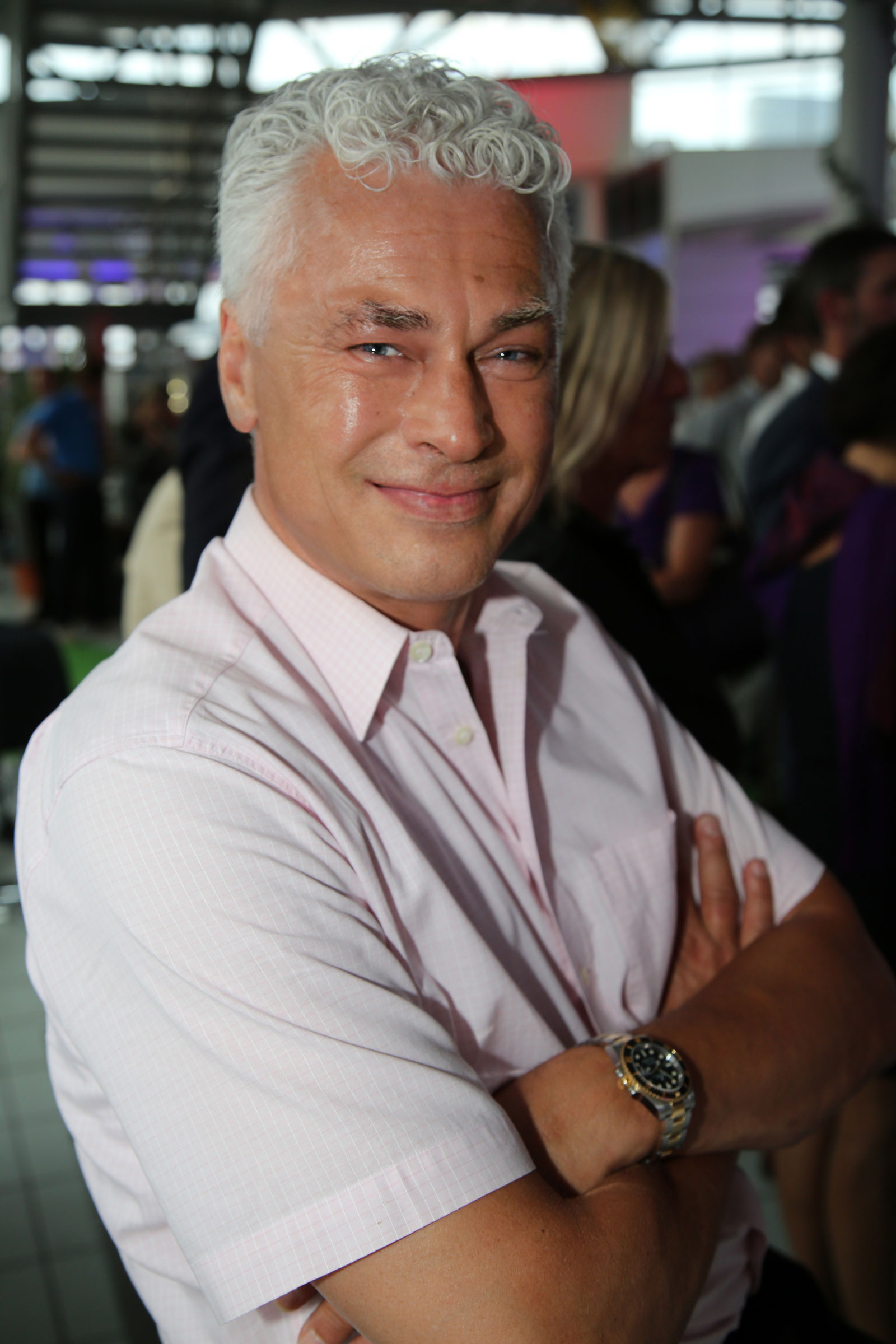
Polster in 2015

Toni Polster is an Austrian professional footballer who represented the Austrian national team between 1982 and 2000. Polster scored 44 goals in 95 international appearances.

Upon scoring his 35th international goal against Latvia on 9 November 1996, Polster became Austria's all-time top scorer, overtaking Hans Krankl. However, he was surpassed by Marko Arnautović on 9 October 2025, when the latter reached 45 goals.

== List of international goals ==
List of international goals scored by Toni Polster
No.	Date	Venue	Opponent	Score	Result	Competition
1	17 November 1982	Gerhard Hanappi Stadium, Vienna, Austria	Turkey	1–0	4–0	UEFA Euro 1984 qualifying
2	7 May 1985	Liebenau Stadium, Graz, Austria	Cyprus	2–0	4–0	1986 FIFA World Cup qualification
3	26 March 1986	Stadio Friuli, Udine, Italy	Italy	1–0	1–2	Friendly
4	27 August 1986	Tivoli, Innsbruck, Austria	Switzerland	1–0	1–1	Friendly
5	15 October 1986	Liebenau Stadium, Graz, Austria	Albania	2–0	3–0	UEFA Euro 1988 qualifying
6	29 October 1986	Praterstadion, Vienna, Austria	West Germany	1–0	4–1	Friendly
7	29 October 1986	Praterstadion, Vienna, Austria	West Germany	2–1	4–1	Friendly
8	1 April 1987	Ernst-Happel-Stadion, Vienna, Austria	Spain	2–2	2–3	Euro 1988 qualifying
9	29 April 1987	Qemal Stafa Stadium, Tirana, Albania	Albania	1–0	1–0	Euro 1988 qualifying
10	2 November 1988	Praterstadion, Vienna, Austria	Turkey	1–0	3–2	1990 FIFA World Cup qualification
11	20 May 1989	Zentralstadion, Leipzig, Germany	East Germany	1–0	1–1	1990 FIFA World Cup qualification
12	15 November 1989	Praterstadion, Vienna, Austria	East Germany	1–0	3–0	1990 FIFA World Cup qualification
13	15 November 1989	Praterstadion, Vienna, Austria	East Germany	2–0	3–0	1990 FIFA World Cup qualification
14	15 November 1989	Praterstadion, Vienna, Austria	East Germany	3–0	3–0	1990 FIFA World Cup qualification
15	28 March 1990	Estadio La Rosaleda, Málaga, Spain	Spain	2–2	3–2	Friendly
16	25 March 1992	Népstadion, Budapest, Hungary	Hungary	1–0	1–2	Friendly
17	14 April 1992	Praterstadion, Vienna, Austria	Lithuania	3–0	4–0	Friendly
18	27 May 1992	De Baandert, Sittard-Geleen, Netherlands	Netherlands	1–2	2–3	Friendly
19	2 September 1992	Linzer Stadion, Linz, Austria	Portugal	1–0	1–1	Friendly
20	28 October 1992	Praterstadion, Vienna, Austria	Israel	3–0	5–2	1994 FIFA World Cup qualification
21	14 April 1993	Ernst-Happel-Stadion, Vienna, Austria	Bulgaria	3–1	3–1	1994 FIFA World Cup qualification
22	2 June 1994	Ernst-Happel-Stadion, Vienna, Austria	Germany	1–4	1–5	Friendly
23	7 September 1994	Sportpark, Eschen, Liechtenstein	Liechtenstein	1–0	4–0	UEFA Euro 1996 qualifying
24	7 September 1994	Sportpark, Eschen, Liechtenstein	Liechtenstein	3–0	4–0	UEFA Euro 1996 qualifying
25	7 September 1994	Sportpark, Eschen, Liechtenstein	Liechtenstein	4–0	4–0	UEFA Euro 1996 qualifying
26	12 October 1994	Ernst-Happel-Stadion, Vienna, Austria	Northern Ireland	1–1	1–2	UEFA Euro 1996 qualifying
27	29 March 1995	Stadion Lehen, Salzburg, Austria	Latvia	4–0	5–0	UEFA Euro 1996 qualifying
28	29 March 1995	Stadion Lehen, Salzburg, Austria	Latvia	5–0	5–0	UEFA Euro 1996 qualifying
29	26 April 1995	Stadion Lehen, Salzburg, Austria	Liechtenstein	2–0	7–0	UEFA Euro 1996 qualifying
30	26 April 1995	Stadion Lehen, Salzburg, Austria	Liechtenstein	4–0	7–0	UEFA Euro 1996 qualifying
31	11 June 1995	Lansdowne Road, Dublin, Ireland	Republic of Ireland	1–1	3–1	UEFA Euro 1996 qualifying
32	11 June 1995	Lansdowne Road, Dublin, Ireland	Republic of Ireland	3–1	3–1	UEFA Euro 1996 qualifying
33	16 August 1995	Daugava Stadium, Riga, Latvia	Latvia	1–2	2–3	UEFA Euro 1996 qualifying
34	24 April 1996	Népstadion, Budapest	Hungary	1–0	2–0	Friendly
35	9 November 1996	Ernst-Happel-Stadion, Vienna, Austria	Latvia	1–0	2–1	1998 FIFA World Cup qualification
36	8 June 1997	Daugava Stadium, Riga, Latvia	Latvia	2–0	3–1	1998 FIFA World Cup qualification
37	20 August 1997	Kadrioru Stadium, Tallinn, Estonia	Estonia	1–0	3–0	1998 FIFA World Cup qualification
38	20 August 1997	Kadrioru Stadium, Tallinn, Estonia	Estonia	2–0	3–0	1998 FIFA World Cup qualification
39	20 August 1997	Kadrioru Stadium, Tallinn, Estonia	Estonia	3–0	3–0	1998 FIFA World Cup qualification
40	11 October 1997	Ernst-Happel-Stadion, Vienna, Austria	Belarus	1–0	4–0	1998 FIFA World Cup qualification
41	11 October 1997	Ernst-Happel-Stadion, Vienna, Austria	Belarus	3–0	4–0	1998 FIFA World Cup qualification
42	2 June 1998	Ernst-Happel-Stadion, Vienna, Austria	Liechtenstein	1–0	6–0	Friendly
43	2 June 1998	Ernst-Happel-Stadion, Vienna, Austria	Liechtenstein	6–0	6–0	Friendly
44	11 June 1998	Stadium Municipal, Toulouse, France	Cameroon	1–1	1–1	1998 FIFA World Cup

== Statistics ==
Caps and goals by year
Year	Caps	Goals
1982	1	1
1983	0	0
1984	3	0
1985	4	1
1986	6	5
1987	6	2
1988	6	1
1989	6	4
1990	10	1
1991	2	0
1992	8	5
1993	7	1
1994	7	5
1995	7	7
1996	6	2
1997	8	6
1998	7	3
1999	0	0
2000	1	0
Total	95	44
