= Toni Polster =

Austrian footballer (born 1964)

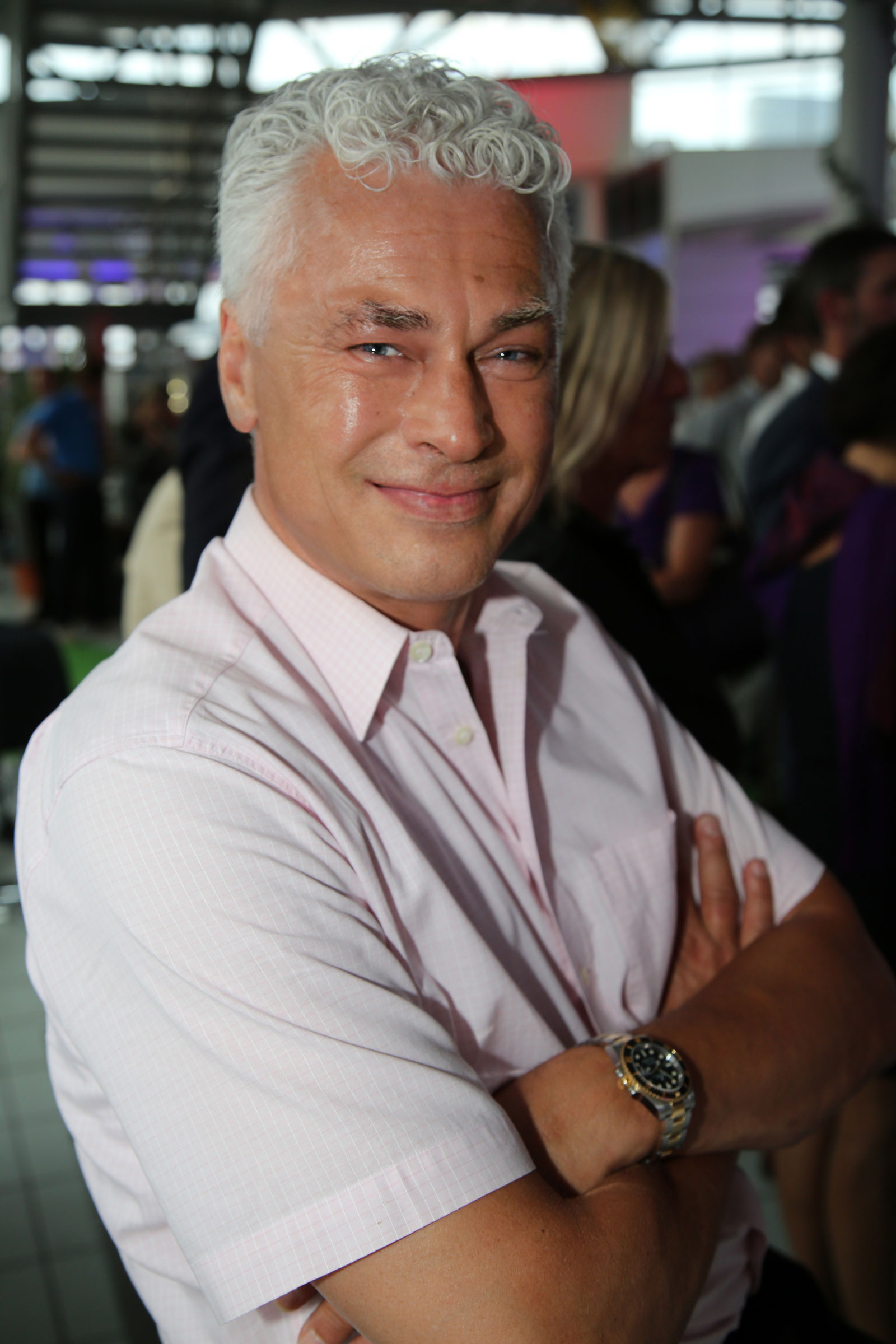
- Polster in 2015

Personal information
- Full name: Anton Polster
- Date of birth: 10 March 1964 (age 62)
- Place of birth: Vienna, Austria
- Height: 1.88 m (6 ft 2 in)
- Position: Striker

Youth career
- 1973–1981: Austria Wien
- 1982: 1. Simmeringer SC

Senior career*
Years	Team	Apps	(Gls)
1982–1987	Austria Wien	146	(119)
1987–1988	Torino	27	(9)
1988–1991	Sevilla	102	(55)
1991–1992	Logroñés	38	(14)
1992–1993	Rayo Vallecano	31	(14)
1993–1998	1. FC Köln	150	(79)
1998–1999	Borussia Mönchengladbach	38	(15)
1999–2000	Austria Salzburg	12	(2)
Total		544	(307)

International career
1982–2000	Austria	95	(44)

Managerial career
- 2010: LASK (reserves)
- 2011–2013: Wiener Viktoria
- 2013: Admira Wacker
- 2014: Wiener Viktoria
- * Club domestic league appearances and goals

Anton "Toni" Polster (born 10 March 1964) is an Austrian professional football coach and former player. He was known to fans as "Toni Doppelpack" – "Toni Brace" because of his tendency to score twice in a match. He is one of the all-time goalscorers for the Austria national team.

== Playing career ==
Polster came through the Austria Wien youth system to make his professional league debut in August 1982, at 18 years of age. He scored his first Bundesliga goal three weeks later and went on to win three league titles and a domestic cup before moving abroad to play a season in Serie A with Torino. Polster then spent the five following years at Spanish teams Sevilla, Logroñés and Rayo Vallecano, ending up with these teams in mid-table as well except for one year, 1989–90, in which Sevilla FC ended in sixth place and played UEFA Cup the following year. In 1990, he finished runner-up in the Spanish goalscoring chart. In 1993, he moved to Germany to spend five years at Köln, again ending up in mid-table every season except for the last one in which he experienced relegation. That made him join Borussia Mönchengladbach next year but they got also relegated at the end of the season and Polster returned to Austria to play a final season at Austria Salzburg. Polster was chosen in Austria's Team of the Century in 2001 and as Austrian Sportsman of the Year in 1997.

In 1983, Polster was selected for the Austria U20 to play at the 1983 FIFA World Youth Championship. In November 1982, Polster debuted for the Austria in a 4–0 victory against Turkey, immediately scoring his first goal. He participated at the 1990 and 1998 World Cups. Polster earned 95 caps, scoring a record 44 goals. He overtook the previous goalscoring record, set by Hans Krankl, in November 1996, scoring his 35th goal against Latvia.

His final (and record-breaking 94th) international appearance was thought to be a 1998 FIFA World Cup match against Italy in June, but he was given an official farewell match in September 2000 against Iran, in which he was substituted in the 21st minute by Christian Mayrleb. His appearances record was surpassed by Andreas Herzog in May 2002.

== Coaching career ==
Polster began his coaching career in January 2010 as the reserve-team coach at LASK. In June 2011, he became the head coach of SC Wiener Viktoria in the Austrian 2. Landesliga, the fifth tier league in Austrian football. During his first season at Wiener Viktoria, the team promoted to the fourth tier and consequently one year afterwards to the Austrian Regional League. On 17 June 2013, he accepted his first coaching role in the Austrian Bundesliga, taking over as the head coach of the top-flight side Admira Wacker Mödling. After starting the season with three straight defeats, including a 7–1 defeat to newly promoted Scholz Grödig, Polster was fired by Admira on 9 August 2013. Polster returned to SC Wiener Viktoria on 13 January 2014.

== Personal life ==
Polster has two children named Anton and Lisa-Marie from his first marriage with Elisabeth Polster. The couple divorced in 2008 due to Polster's alleged relationship with other women. He got married for the second time to a woman named Birgit in 2018.

== Career statistics ==
=== Club ===
Appearances and goals by club, season and competition
Club	Season	League			Cup (Note: Includes Austrian Cup, Coppa Italia, Copa del Rey and DFB-Pokal)		Europe		Other		Total	
Club	Season	Division	Apps	Goals	Apps	Goals	Apps	Goals	Apps	Goals	Apps	Goals
Austria Wien	1982–83	Austrian Bundesliga	26	11	1	2	8 (Note: Appearances in UEFA Cup Winners' Cup)	5	—		35	18
Austria Wien	1983–84	Austrian Bundesliga	23	13	8	10	8 (Note: Appearances in UEFA Cup)	1	—		39	24
Austria Wien	1984–85	Austrian Bundesliga	29	24	6	9	6 (Note: Appearances in European Cup)	3	—		41	36
Austria Wien	1985–86	Austrian Bundesliga	34	32	4	4	4	4	—		42	40
Austria Wien	1986–87	Austrian Bundesliga	34	39	4	4	4	3	1 (Note: Appearance in Austrian Supercup)	1	43	47
Austria Wien	Total		146	119	23	29	30	16	1	1	200	165
Torino	1987–88	Serie A	27	9	12	5	—		1 (Note: Appearance in UEFA Cup play-off)	0	40	14
Sevilla	1988–89	La Liga	32	9	—		—		—		32	9
Sevilla	1989–90	La Liga	35	33	—		—		—		35	33
Sevilla	1990–91	La Liga	35	13	4	1	4	1	—		43	15
Sevilla	Total		102	55	4	1	4	1	—		110	57
Logroñés	1991–92	La Liga	38	14	7	7	—		—		45	21
Rayo Vallecano	1992–93	La Liga	31	14	0	0	—		—		31	14
1. FC Köln	1993–94	Bundesliga	25	17	1	2	—		—		26	19
1. FC Köln	1994–95	Bundesliga	32	17	5	2	—		—		37	19
1. FC Köln	1995–96	Bundesliga	28	11	1	0	4 (Note: Appearances in UEFA Intertoto Cup)	3	—		33	14
1. FC Köln	1996–97	Bundesliga	32	21	1	0	—		—		33	21
1. FC Köln	1997–98	Bundesliga	33	13	1	0	5	2	—		39	15
1. FC Köln	Total		150	79	9	4	9	5	—		168	88
Borussia Mönchengladbach	1998–99	Bundesliga	31	11	4	3	—		—		35	14
Borussia Mönchengladbach	1999–2000	2. Bundesliga	7	4	1	0	—		—		8	4
Borussia Mönchengladbach	Total		38	15	5	3	—		—		43	18
Austria Salzburg	1999–2000	Austrian Bundesliga	12	2	4	3	—		—		16	5
Career total			544	307	64	52	43	22	2	1	653	382

=== International ===
Appearances and goals by national team and year
National team	Year	Apps	Goals
Austria	1982	1	1
Austria	1983	0	0
Austria	1984	3	0
Austria	1985	4	1
Austria	1986	6	5
Austria	1987	6	2
Austria	1988	6	1
Austria	1989	6	4
Austria	1990	10	1
Austria	1991	2	0
Austria	1992	8	5
Austria	1993	7	1
Austria	1994	7	5
Austria	1995	7	7
Austria	1996	6	2
Austria	1997	8	6
Austria	1998	7	3
Austria	1999	0	0
Austria	2000	1	0
Total		95	44

=== Managerial ===
As of 15 May 2014

Managerial record by club and tenure
Team	From	To	Record								
Team	From	To	G	W	D	L	GF	GA	GD	Win %	Ref.
LASK (A)^{1}	4 January 2010	29 November 2010	16	8	1	7	29	26	+3	50.00	
SC Wiener Viktoria^{2}	1 July 2011	17 June 2013	33	22	6	5	88	32	+56	66.67	
Admira Wacker Mödling	17 June 2013	9 August 2013	4	1	0	3	4	11	−7	25.00	
SC Wiener Viktoria	13 January 2014	Present	51	19	6	26	16	34	−18	37.25	
Total			104	50	13	41	137	103	+34	48.08	

- 1.Only 2010–11 season matches are included. Matches before 4 January 2010 – 6 August 2010 not included.
- 2.Only 2012–13 season matches are included. Matches from the 2011–12 season not included.

== Honours ==
Austria Wien

- Austrian Football Bundesliga: 1983–84, 1984–85, 1985–86
- Austrian Cup: 1985–86

Individual

- Austrian Football Bundesliga Top scorer: 1984–85, 1985–86, 1986–87
- Austrian Footballer of the Year: 1985–86, 1996–97
- European Golden Shoe: 1986–87
- Kicker Bundesliga Team of the Season: 1993-94
