= Christian Vieri =

Italian footballer (born 1973)

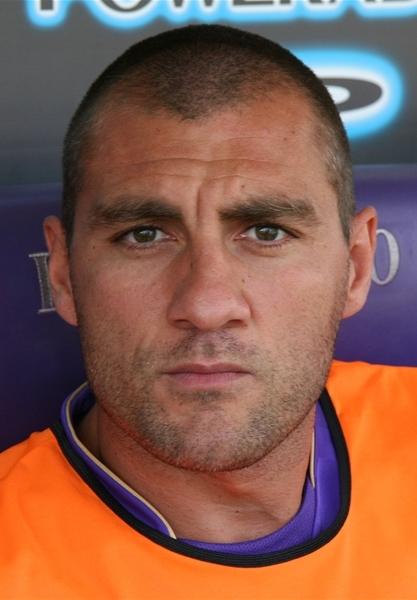
- Vieri at Fiorentina in the 2007–08 season

Personal information
- Date of birth: 12 July 1973 (age 53)
- Place of birth: Bologna, Italy
- Height: 1.85 m (6 ft 1 in)
- Position: Centre forward

Youth career
- 1987–1988: Marconi Stallions
- 1989–1990: Santa Lucia
- 1990–1991: Prato
- 1991–1992: Torino

Senior career*
Years	Team	Apps	(Gls)
1991–1992	Torino	7	(1)
1992–1993	Pisa	18	(2)
1993–1994	Ravenna	32	(12)
1994–1995	Venezia	29	(11)
1995–1996	Atalanta	21	(9)
1996–1997	Juventus	23	(8)
1997–1998	Atlético Madrid	24	(24)
1998–1999	Lazio	22	(12)
1999–2005	Inter Milan	143	(103)
2005–2006	AC Milan	8	(1)
2006	Monaco	7	(3)
2006	Sampdoria	0	(0)
2006–2007	Atalanta	7	(2)
2007–2008	Fiorentina	26	(6)
2008–2009	Atalanta	9	(2)
Total		374	(194)

International career
1992–1996	Italy U21	22	(11)
1997–2005	Italy	49	(23)
Medal record
Representing Italy
Men's football
UEFA European Under-21 Championship
Winner	1994
Winner	1996
- * Club domestic league appearances and goals

Christian Vieri (Italian pronunciation: [ˈkristjaɱ ˈvjɛːri]; born 12 July 1973) is an Italian former professional footballer who played as a centre forward. Having been born in Italy, Vieri moved with his family to Australia as a child, before returning to Italy to pursue his professional career at a young age. He then spent the bulk of his career playing in Serie A. In March 2004, he was named in the FIFA 100, a list of the 125 greatest living footballers selected by Pelé as a part of FIFA's centenary celebrations.

A prolific goalscorer, he was widely regarded as one of the best strikers of his generation, leading to him becoming the world's most expensive player in 1999 when Inter Milan paid Lazio £32 million (€43 million) for his services. Something of a footballing nomad, Vieri played for 12 clubs throughout his career, mainly in Italy, but also in Spain and France. He started his career with Torino in 1991, but his most notable and successful spells were those at Juventus, Atlético Madrid, Lazio, and Inter, clubs with which he won several honours.

As well as picking up several winners' medals during his career, Vieri also claimed many individual awards including the Pichichi Trophy and Capocannoniere awards for the league's top scorer in Spain and Italy respectively, and the Serie A Italian Footballer of the Year twice. At international level, Vieri scored 23 goals in 49 appearances for Italy between 1997 and 2005. He is also one of Italy's highest ever goalscorers, with 23 goals putting him in joint ninth place alongside Francesco Graziani. More pressingly, no Italian has scored more World Cup goals than Vieri, with his combined nine goals from nine matches at the 1998 and 2002 tournaments making him the joint-highest World Cup scorer for Italy alongside Roberto Baggio and Paolo Rossi. He also took part at Euro 2004.

== Early life ==
Born in Bologna, Italy, to active professional footballer Roberto Vieri and Christiane "Nathalie" Rivaux, Vieri is of Italian and French descent as his mother was born in Casablanca and raised in Paris. He spent the first years of his life in the capital of the Emilia-Romagna region while his Prato-born father played for Bologna. With Roberto Vieri's 1977 transfer to Marconi Stallions, the family moved to Sydney, Australia, residing in the suburb of Wetherill Park in South Western Sydney, where young Christian attended Patrician Brothers' College, Fairfield. It is from his father that he inherited his nickname Bobo which he carried with him throughout his career.

During his time in Australia, Vieri developed a love for both football and cricket, a sport he still follows to this day. He stated in an interview that he would have liked to have been a professional cricketer. His younger brother, Massimiliano "Max" Vieri, was also a professional footballer and was an Australian international in 2004. Vieri played for Marconi Juniors when he was a child, but his family subsequently moved back to Italy. In an interview at the 1998 FIFA World Cup, Vieri named his all-time sporting hero as Australian cricketer Allan Border, and said that as a child he was better at cricket than football.

== Club career ==
=== Early career ===
Vieri started his playing career at Marconi Stallions. Upon his return to Italy in 1988, his first club was Santa Lucia, a team from Prato, where his first coach was Luciano Diamanti, the father of the player Alessandro Diamanti. The next year he became affiliated with Prato and scored several goals in the Campionato Nazionale Dante Berretti.

The following year, he moved to Torino after being spotted by Serino Rampanti, who recommended him to the coach Sergio Vatta. The president of Prato, Andrea Toccafondi, did not want to sell the promising striker. To convince him to sell Vieri to Torino, the Granata also had to buy the son of Toccafondi, Paolo, who was a goalkeeper. After a year in the Torino youth ranks, Vieri was given his first team debut at age 18, on 30 October 1991 in the 1991–92 Coppa Italia under Emiliano Mondonico; he scored the second goal in a 2–0 win for Torino against Lazio. On 15 December of the same year, he made his official debut in Serie A during the final minutes of a home game against Fiorentina (2–0). He would later score his first goal in the league in a match won 4–0 against Genoa. At the end of the 1991–92 season, Vieri would pick up a runners up medal as an unused substitute in the 1992 UEFA Cup final, lost on away goals to Ajax.

In November 1992, Vieri was sold to Serie B club Pisa, scoring two goals in 18 appearances. He would only stay in Pisa for one season, moving to fellow Serie B side Ravenna for the 1993–94 season, where he scored 12 goals in 32 appearances. He was subsequently transferred to another Serie B club for the 1994–95 season, Venezia, where he scored 11 goals in 29 appearances.

=== Serie A ===
After three seasons in Serie B, Vieri returned to Serie A for the 1995–96 season, when he joined Atalanta, scoring 9 goals in 21 appearances across all competitions, also reaching the 1996 Coppa Italia final, where they lost out to Fiorentina.

His first big move came when he was signed by Juventus from Atalanta for a fee of €2.5 million for the 1996–97 season. He made 23 appearances and scored 8 goals in Serie A, and six goals in ten matches in Europe, making him joint top scorer for Juventus that season along with Alen Bokšić. He ended his season at Juve by winning the 'Scudetto and starting in the 3–1 UEFA Champions League final loss to Borussia Dortmund; during the latter match, he had a goal controversially disallowed by referee Sándor Puhl for an alleged handball.

=== Atlético Madrid ===
Vieri's form for Juventus attracted the attention of Spanish side Atlético Madrid who paid £12.5 million to sign the striker in 1997. He was part of a £45 million spending spree for the club owned by Jesús Gil that season, alongside Juninho Paulista.

Vieri made his debut for Atlético on 30 August 1997 in a 1–1 draw with Real Madrid at the Santiago Bernabéu Stadium on the first day of the La Liga season. He scored his first goal on 16 September, a penalty in a 2–1 home win against Leicester City in the first round of the UEFA Cup. Eleven days later he opened his league account with two goals in a 3–3 home draw with Celta. In October, he scored back-to-back hat-tricks in a 5–1 win at Real Zaragoza and a 5–2 home win over PAOK in the quarter-finals of the European competition. On 21 March 1998, he scored four times away to Salamanca, but the Rojiblancos lost 5–4.

He scored a total of 24 goals in 24 league appearances for Atlético and finished the season with 29 goals from 32 appearances, which saw him receive the Pichichi Trophy as the league's top scorer.

Vieri stated in his 2015 autobiography that his 1997 transfer to Atlético was motivated purely by financial reasons—revealing that Juventus would only pay him an annual salary of L.2 million while the Spanish club were offering the equivalent of L.3.5 million. He furthermore asserted: "If I could have turned back time, I’d have stayed in Turin".

Vieri also revealed a funny story about the aforementioned back-to-back hat-tricks against Real Zaragoza and PAOK. Before the match with PAOK, Vieri made a bet with Jesús Gil: if he scored a hat-trick, the President would have given him a Ferrari. The striker did find the net three times, with the third goal, scored from the goal line, being one of the most iconic moments of his career, and Gil made him choose his gift car. However, Vieri never picked up his Ferrari at the end of the season, as he felt he had betrayed the President by leaving Atlético after just one year.

=== Lazio ===
After his performances for Atlético and at the 1998 World Cup, Vieri returned to Serie A with Lazio for a fee of €25 million. He partnered Chilean international Marcelo Salas for the Rome-based club, managed by Sven-Göran Eriksson. He had a successful season, scoring 14 goals in 28 appearances, and won the Cup Winners' Cup. He scored the first goal of the 2–1 win over Mallorca in the final at Villa Park on 19 May, the last match in the tournament's history.

=== Inter Milan ===
The following season, Vieri was the subject of a then world record transfer of €49 million (90 billion Italian lire, £32 million) to Inter Milan after drawing the attention of chairman Massimo Moratti and manager Marcello Lippi, who had requested the player after their successful season together at Juventus. Inter would be Vieri's ninth club in his ninth season of being a professional footballer, and the only one where he would play for more than one season, for a total of six.

At Inter, Vieri formed a potentially dangerous partnership with Ronaldo up front, but because of injuries to both players, they were not able to play together often. He was impressive in his first couple of seasons, but constant managerial changes meant that Inter could not challenge for the Scudetto. It was under disciplined Argentinian coach Héctor Cúper that Vieri and Inter really began to flourish and challenge for honours. Vieri was made the focal point of the attack and scored 22 goals in 25 games in the 2001–02 season as Inter narrowly missed out on the title after their last-day defeat to Lazio. The following season, he was Serie A Capocannoniere after scoring 24 goals in 23 appearances. In addition, he scored three goals in Inter's Champions League campaign and formed a potent partnership with Hernán Crespo. He scored both of Inter's goals in the quarter-final victory over Valencia. Vieri was injured during the second leg of this game and therefore played no part in the semi-final defeat to city rivals AC Milan.

The following year, Cúper was sacked only a few games into the season and was replaced by Alberto Zaccheroni. Vieri did not get along with his new manager and also had many of the Inter fans turn on him after his dip in form. In addition, he had shown his discontent at the sale of strike partner Crespo to Chelsea. When Roberto Mancini replaced Zaccheroni in the summer of 2004, Vieri played the majority of games upfront with Adriano. It was clear to many, though, that the injury he had sustained against Valencia had taken its toll on Vieri and he was no longer as sharp in front of goal, despite his respectable goal output. On 6 January 2004, he scored his 100th goal for the club in a 3–1 home win against Lecce, being celebrated by his teammates with a crown.

=== Later career ===
In July 2005, Vieri and Inter came to a mutual agreement to terminate his contract with the club. He was then signed by cross-town rivals AC Milan on a two-year deal, amidst interest from Newcastle United. He scored his only goal for them on 26 October to wrap up a 3–1 win at Empoli. Due to his poor performances throughout the season, he won the Bidone d'Oro Award in 2005, which is given to the worst Serie A player during a particular season.

In January 2006, he moved on a free transfer to Monaco, on a two-and-a-half-year deal, being brought in by compatriot manager Francesco Guidolin who had also loaned an Italian strike partner in the form of Marco Di Vaio. On 26 March, he suffered a knee injury through a collision with Paris Saint-Germain's Bernard Mendy, which eventually ruled him out of a place in Italy's squad that won the 2006 FIFA World Cup.

Vieri agreed a one-year deal with Sampdoria on 6 July 2006; however, he returned to Atalanta on 29 August, signing a one-year minimum wage contract worth €1,500 per month. Although he received a paltry salary, Vieri was to earn another €100,000 for every goal he scored, leaving chairman Ivan Ruggeri to comment, "If things go well, Vieri will cost me €2 million." Vieri scored two goals in seven substitute appearances, including one spectacular long-range effort.

In June 2007, Atalanta announced they would not offer a contract extension to Vieri. His contract therefore ended on 30 June. Vieri signed a one-year deal with Fiorentina in the summer of 2007, and he was officially presented to the press on 21 July 2007. He signed a one-year-contract for Atalanta on 30 June 2008; however, in early April, both Atalanta and Vieri mutually agreed that the contract was to be rescinded after only making nine appearances for the club. He announced his retirement from professional football on 20 October 2009.

== International career ==
Vieri scored 23 goals in 49 matches for Italy between 1997 and 2005. He played for his country at the 1998 World Cup, scoring five times, and the 2002 World Cup, scoring four times. He endured a less successful tournament at Euro 2004, whilst he missed Euro 2000 and 2006 World Cup through injury. Vieri is generally considered to be Italy's greatest pure striker of recent times, despite strong competition, and is one of Italy's most prolific World Cup goal scorers. Appearing in a total of nine World Cup games in 1998 and 2002, he found the net nine times, making him one of the most feared strikers in those tournaments along with Ronaldo and Miroslav Klose, and Italy's joint-highest World Cup goalscorer, alongside Roberto Baggio and Paolo Rossi. He was named by Pelé as one of the 125 greatest living footballers in March 2004. Alongside Francesco Graziani, he is Italy's ninth-highest goalscorer of all time.

Vieri received his first international cap during the 1996–97 season after some impressive displays for Juventus; he made his Italy senior debut on 29 March 1997, at the age of 23, in a 3–0 win over Moldova, in which he also scored his first international goal, which was also the 1000th goal scored by the Italy national team. He scored a key goal for Italy in a 1–1 draw in the away leg of the team's play off against Russia during their qualification campaign for the 1998 World Cup. At the finals of the tournament in France he formed a strong partnership with Roberto Baggio. Vieri opened the scoring against Chile after an assist from his strike partner. He went on to score three more goals during the group stage: two against Cameroon, and one against Austria. Vieri scored Italy's only goal in the round of 16 match against Norway. He scored Italy's fourth penalty in the quarter-final shootout against hosts and eventual champions France, but Luigi Di Biagio missed the fifth spot-kick, and Italy were eliminated. The aforementioned quarter-final showdown against France, which had ended in a 0–0 draw following extra time, was the only game of the tournament in which Vieri was unable to score.

Vieri missed out Dino Zoff's squad for Euro 2000 after suffering a recurrence of an old thigh injury, following a collision with Gianluigi Buffon during the Serie A fourth place playoff for the final Champions League spot with Inter, against Parma, at the end of the 1999–2000 season; Buffon would later also miss out on the tournament through injury.

Italy played Vieri as a lone striker in the 2002 World Cup under manager Giovanni Trapattoni, scoring an impressive four goals in four games. He managed a brace in the opening game against Ecuador, and scored Italy's only goal in the 2–1 defeat to Croatia despite having a previous goal incorrectly ruled out for offside. In the round of 16 match against co-hosts South Korea, he opened the scoring in the 18th minute, scoring a powerful header from a Francesco Totti corner. Italy led the game until the Koreans equalised two minutes before the end. Just one minute after the Korean equaliser, Vieri missed an open goal which would have put Italy in front. Italy were eventually eliminated by South Korea by a golden goal. The only game in which he failed to find the net was against Mexico in a 1–1 draw.

Vieri was once again the main striker in Italy's ill-fated Euro 2004 campaign. This time he did not fare so well, however, scoring no goals as Italy were eliminated in the first round. It was during this tournament that his now infamous "more of a man" press conference took place following Italy's 1–1 draw against Sweden, where he hit back at his critics in the Italian press by insulting them, and stated that he was "more of a man" than any of them, and accused them of publishing false news stories, after a rumour concerning a supposed quarrel between Vieri and his teammate Gianluigi Buffon had been leaked in the press. It is worth noting that Euro 2004 occurred at a particularly painful period of Vieri's life, when he was being spied upon by his own club Inter and Telecom Italia at the request of club owner Massimo Moratti. In September 2012, Inter and Telecom Italia were ordered by a Milan court to pay Vieri damages amounting to €1 million for this case of phone tapping.

More disappointment occurred when he missed the 2006 World Cup after suffering a knee meniscus injury in a Ligue 1 match with Monaco against Paris Saint-Germain on 26 March 2006. Although Vieri would not necessarily have been a starter for Marcello Lippi's side, Lippi admitted that he would have picked him had he been fit, and even encouraged him to move to France in order to gain more playing time ahead of the tournament. He played in three tournaments, but failed to win a medal in each of them, missing out on the Euro 2000 runners-up medal and the 2006 World Cup winners medal due to injury. His final appearance for Italy had come against Moldova, the team against which he had also made his debut, on 12 October 2005, under Lippi; he marked the occasion by scoring his final international goal in the 2–1 home win.

== Style of play ==
Vieri was a complete, prolific and opportunistic striker, with a keen eye for goal. Due to his notable goal-scoring prowess, Vieri is regarded by pundits as one of the greatest Italian strikers of all time and one of the top strikers of his generation. Although he was considered to be more of a physical rather than talented player in his youth, who lacked strong technical ability, he was able to refine his touch on the ball in training as his career progressed, showing significant improvements to his technique. In his prime, his unique and direct offensive style of play, which blended power with pace and solid technical skills, led him to be compared to Luigi Riva and Roberto Boninsegna, as well as earning him the nickname of "Il Toro" ("The Bull"). Despite his goalscoring ability, he was also injury-prone throughout his career, however, which greatly affected his pace, fitness and mobility in later years. Vieri was predominantly left-footed, although he was capable of scoring with both feet, as well as with his head, and from volleys. He has often been described as a large, old fashioned centre forward, due to his powerful physical presence and outstanding aerial ability; he is the all-time top scorer of headed goals in Italian league history. He also excelled at finding space to anticipate opponents and get on the end of passes. Despite being primarily a goal-scoring striker, he was also capable of providing assists to teammates, which was aided by his ability to use his strength to hold up the ball and play with his back to goal in order to participate in the build-up of attacking plays; he also excelled at beating the offside trap to get on the end of long balls with his runs in behind the defence, which also allowed him to provide depth to his team. Although he was primarily a goal-area threat, Vieri had an accurate and powerful shot from distance as well as inside the area; he was also an accurate penalty taker.

== Personal life ==
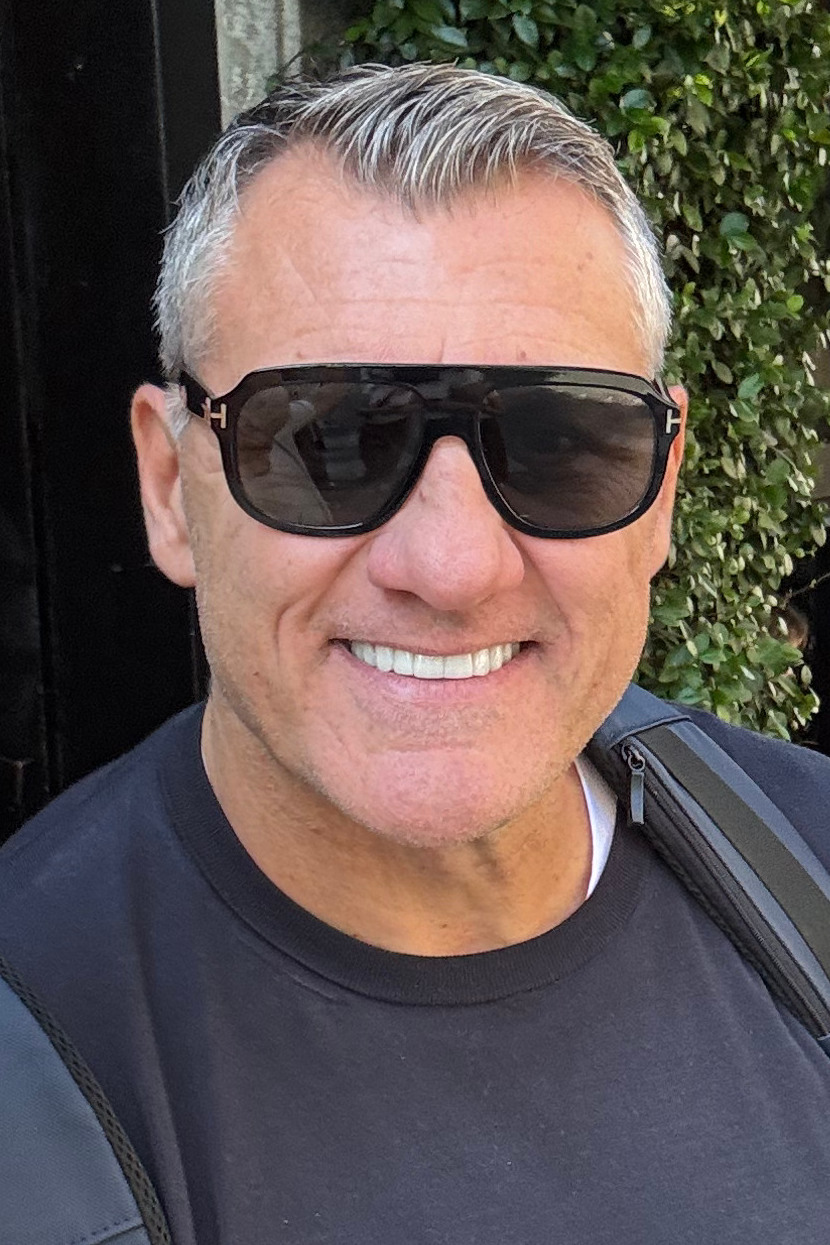
Vieri in 2025

Vieri's personal life has been subject to much media attention in Italy. He has been involved in many high-profile relationships, including those with models Elisabetta Canalis, Elena Santarelli, Debora Salvalaggio, Fernanda Lessa, Melissa Satta and Jazzma Kendrick, among others.

Vieri has his own fashion label – Sweet Years – which he runs with friend and former Italy and AC Milan teammate Paolo Maldini. The pair also own a number of restaurants in the city of Milan. Another close friend of his is former forward Alessandro Matri, with whom he has been seen holidaying in Spain, along with other friends. He also started another clothing brand (Baci & Abbracci) with close friend and footballer Cristian Brocchi and model Alena Šeredová.

Vieri presented a footvolley cup with the name Bobo Summer Cup in 2018.

In 2017, Vieri began a relationship with Italian showgirl Costanza Caracciolo. On 18 November 2018, Vieri and Caracciolo announced the birth of their daughter Stella on Instagram. On 18 March 2019, the pair were married in a small civil ceremony at Villa Litta Modignani in the Affori ward of Milan. Toward the end of October that year, the couple announced that they were expecting a second child.

== Media ==
Vieri features in EA Sports' FIFA video game series; he was on the cover for the Italian edition of FIFA 99, and was named in the Ultimate Team Legends in FIFA 14.

Vieri featured as Ivan Drago in the 2000 Italian film, Picasso's face.

In December 2003, Vieri participated in the Italian TV broadcast Chi vuol essere milionario? forming a memorable duo with Gennaro Gattuso during an episode organised for charity purposes. Vieri and Gattuso answered 13 questions in a row correctly, retiring after reading the second-to-last question, winning an outstanding amount of €150,000. The thirteenth question represented a dramatic yet hilarious moment on Italian television: being the duo doubtful about the correct answer, Vincenzo Montella, one of the football players who were in the audience, invited Vieri and Gattuso to walk away with the already collected amount of €70,000 without risking to reduce the final prize to €16,000 answering incorrectly. Vieri playfully suggested selling the player ("Ma vendetelo!"). While Gattuso jokingly asked for Montella to be removed from the studio as he was behaving like a jinx ("Porta una sfiga Montella, mandatelo via!").

Having retired from professional football, Vieri started working as a pundit and consultant for beIN Sports. He successively started his weekly Twitch-based podcast, named Bobo TV, together with former teammates Antonio Cassano, Daniele Adani and Nicola Ventola, which quickly became one of the most popular Web-based shows in Italy.

== Career statistics ==
=== Club ===
Appearances and goals by club, season and competition
Club	Season	League			National cup (Note: Includes Coppa Italia, Copa del Rey, Coupe de France)		Continental		Other		Total	
Club	Season	Division	Apps	Goals	Apps	Goals	Apps	Goals	Apps	Goals	Apps	Goals
Torino	1991–92	Serie A	6	1	1	1	0	0	–		7	2
Torino	1992–93	Serie A	1	0	1	0	0	0	–		2	0
Torino	Total		7	1	2	1	0	0	0	0	9	2
Pisa	1992–93	Serie B	18	2	0	0	–		–		18	2
Ravenna	1993–94	Serie B	32	12	0	0	–		–		32	12
Venezia	1994–95	Serie B	29	11	0	0	–		–		29	11
Atalanta	1995–96	Serie A	19	7	2	2	–		–		21	9
Juventus	1996–97	Serie A	23	8	5	1	8 (Note: Appearances in UEFA Champions League)	4	1 (Note: Appearance in UEFA Super Cup)	1	37	14
Atlético Madrid	1997–98	La Liga	24	24	1	0	7 (Note: Appearances in UEFA Cup)	5	–		32	29
Lazio	1998–99	Serie A	22	12	2	1	4 (Note: Appearances in UEFA Cup Winners' Cup)	1	0	0	28	14
Inter Milan	1999–2000	Serie A	19	13	5	5	–		1 (Note: Serie A Champions League play-off match (2000))	0	25	18
Inter Milan	2000–01	Serie A	27	18	0	0	5	1	0	0	32	19
Inter Milan	2001–02	Serie A	25	22	1	0	2	3	–		28	25
Inter Milan	2002–03	Serie A	23	24	0	0	14	3	–		37	27
Inter Milan	2003–04	Serie A	22	13	1	0	9 (Note: Five appearances and two goals in UEFA Champions League, four appearances and two goals in UEFA Cup)	4	–		32	17
Inter Milan	2004–05	Serie A	27	13	3	3	6	1	–		36	17
Inter Milan	Total		143	103	10	8	36	12	1	0	190	123
AC Milan	2005–06	Serie A	8	1	1	1	5	0	–		14	2
Monaco	2005–06	Ligue 1	7	3	0	0	2	1	2 (Note: Appearances in Coupe de la Ligue)	1	11	5
Atalanta	2006–07	Serie A	7	2	0	0	–		–		7	2
Fiorentina	2007–08	Serie A	26	6	1	0	12	3	–		39	9
Atalanta	2008–09	Serie A	9	2	0	0	–		–		9	2
Career total			374	194	24	14	74	26	4	2	476	236

=== International ===
Appearances and goals by national team and year
National team	Year	Apps	Goals
Italy	1997	7	2
Italy	1998	7	6
Italy	1999	5	2
Italy	2000	1	0
Italy	2001	2	0
Italy	2002	8	5
Italy	2003	6	4
Italy	2004	7	3
Italy	2005	6	1
Total		49	23

Scores and results list Italy's goal tally first, score column indicates score after each Vieri goal.

List of international goals scored by Christian Vieri
No.	Date	Venue	Opponent	Score	Result	Competition
1	29 March 1997	Stadio Nereo Rocco, Trieste, Italy	Moldova	2–0	3–0	1998 FIFA World Cup qualifier
2	29 October 1997	Dynamo Stadium, Moscow, Russia	Russia	1–0	1–1	1998 FIFA World Cup qualifier
3	11 June 1998	Parc Lescure, Bordeaux, France	Chile	1–0	2–2	1998 FIFA World Cup
4	17 June 1998	Stade de la Mosson, Montpellier, France	Cameroon	2–0	3–0	1998 FIFA World Cup
5	17 June 1998	Stade de la Mosson, Montpellier, France	Cameroon	3–0	3–0	1998 FIFA World Cup
6	23 June 1998	Stade de France, Saint-Denis, France	Austria	1–0	2–1	1998 FIFA World Cup
7	27 June 1998	Stade Vélodrome, Marseille, France	Norway	1–0	1–0	1998 FIFA World Cup
8	5 September 1998	Anfield, Liverpool, England	Wales	2–0	2–0	UEFA Euro 2000 qualifier
9	5 June 1999	Stadio Renato Dall'Ara, Bologna, Italy	Wales	1–0	4–0	UEFA Euro 2000 qualifier
10	8 September 1999	Stadio San Paolo, Naples, Italy	Denmark	2–0	2–3	UEFA Euro 2000 qualifier
11	3 June 2002	Sapporo Dome, Sapporo, Japan	Ecuador	1–0	2–0	2002 FIFA World Cup
12	3 June 2002	Sapporo Dome, Sapporo, Japan	Ecuador	2–0	2–0	2002 FIFA World Cup
13	8 June 2002	Kashima Soccer Stadium, Kashima, Japan	Croatia	1–0	1–2	2002 FIFA World Cup
14	18 June 2002	Daejeon World Cup Stadium, Daejeon, South Korea	South Korea	1–0	1–2	2002 FIFA World Cup
15	20 November 2002	Stadio Adriatico, Pescara, Italy	Turkey	1–1	1–1	Friendly
16	29 March 2003	Stadio Renzo Barbera, Palermo, Italy	Finland	1–0	2–0	UEFA Euro 2004 qualifier
17	29 March 2003	Stadio Renzo Barbera, Palermo, Italy	Finland	2–0	2–0	UEFA Euro 2004 qualifier
18	20 August 2003	Gottlieb Daimler Stadion, Stuttgart, Germany	Germany	1–0	1–0	Friendly
19	11 October 2003	Stadio Oreste Granillo, Reggio Calabria, Italy	Azerbaijan	1–0	4–0	UEFA Euro 2004 qualifier
20	18 February 2004	Stadio Renzo Barbera, Palermo, Italy	Czech Republic	1–0	2–2	Friendly
21	31 March 2004	Estádio Municipal de Braga, Braga, Portugal	Portugal	1–1	2–1	Friendly
22	28 April 2004	Stadio Luigi Ferraris, Genoa, Italy	Spain	1–1	1–1	Friendly
23	12 October 2005	Stadio Via del Mare, Lecce, Italy	Moldova	1–0	2–1	2006 FIFA World Cup qualifier

== Honours ==
Torino

- Coppa Italia: 1992–93

Juventus

- Serie A: 1996–97
- UEFA Super Cup: 1996
- Intercontinental Cup: 1996

Lazio

- UEFA Cup Winners' Cup: 1998–99

Inter Milan

- Coppa Italia: 2004–05

Italy

- UEFA European Under-21 Championship: 1994, 1996

Individual

- Pichichi Trophy: 1997–98
- ESM Team of the Year: 1997–98, 2002–03
- FIFA World Cup Silver Boot: 1998
- FIFA World Cup All-Star Team: 1998 (Reserve)
- Man of the Match: 1999 UEFA Cup Winners' Cup final
- Serie A Footballer of the Year: 1999
- Serie A Italian Footballer of the Year: 1999, 2002
- World XI: 1999
- Guerin d'Oro: 2002
- Pirata d'Oro (Inter Milan Player Of The Year): 2002
- Capocannoniere: 2002–03
- FIFA 100
- World Soccer: The 100 Greatest Footballers of All Time
- Gazzetta Sports Awards – Legend: 2018
- Inter Milan Hall of Fame: 2022
