= Roberto Mussi =

Italian association football player

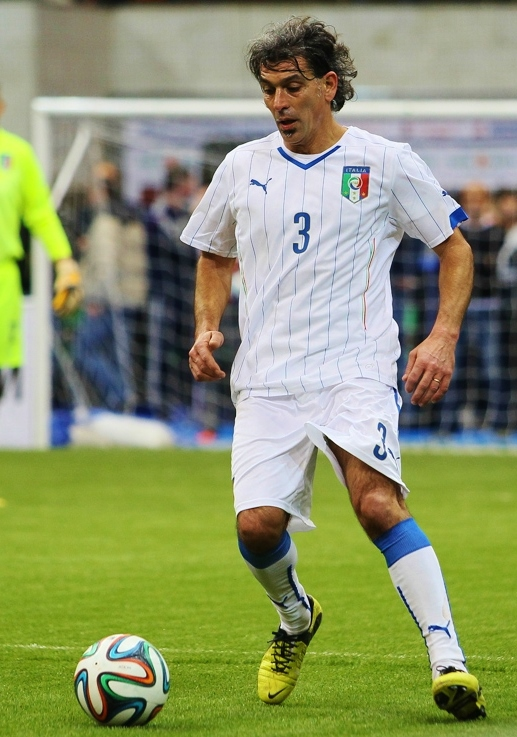
- Mussi during an exhibition match in 2015

Personal information
- Full name: Roberto Mussi
- Date of birth: 25 August 1963 (age 63)
- Place of birth: Massa, Italy
- Height: 1.79 m (5 ft 10 in)
- Position: Defender

Youth career
- Massese

Senior career*
Years	Team	Apps	(Gls)
1981–1984	Massese	83	(0)
1984–1987	Parma	88	(0)
1987–1989	Milan	30	(0)
1989–1994	Torino	129	(5)
1994–1999	Parma	125	(2)
Total		455	(7)

International career
1993–1996	Italy	11	(0)
Medal record
Men's Football
Representing Italy
FIFA World Cup
Runner-up	1994 USA
- * Club domestic league appearances and goals

Roberto Mussi (Italian pronunciation: [roˈbɛrto ˈmussi]; born 25 August 1963) is an Italian former professional footballer, who played as a defender; a versatile player, he was capable of playing both as a centre-back or right-back. Due to his dynamism, tenacity, work-rate, and technique, he was capable of helping his team both offensively and defensively as a fullback on the flank. At international level, he represented Italy at the 1994 FIFA World Cup, where they reached the final, and at UEFA Euro 1996. Following his retirement, he worked as a manager.

== Club career ==
Throughout his career, Mussi played for several Italian clubs. He made his professional debut with Massese (1981–84), and helped the team to gain promotion to Serie C2. He subsequently moved to Parma in 1984, where he enjoyed a successful spell under manager Arrigo Sacchi in Serie C1, helping the club to a Serie B promotion by winning the Serie C title.

In 1987, Sacchi purchased his former young fullback, making him part of his legendary Milan side. Mussi spent two seasons with the club (1987–89), winning an Italian Serie A title and a Supercoppa Italiana in 1988, as well as one European Cup (the predecessor to the UEFA Champions League) in 1989 with the club.

He subsequently moved to Serie B side Torino in 1989, helping the team to win the Serie B title that season, and to earn promotion to Serie A. The following season, he won the 1991 edition of the Mitropa Cup with Torino, and he helped his club to qualify for the UEFA Cup the next season by finishing the Serie A season in fifth place. During the 1991–92 season, Mussi led Torino to a third-place finish in Serie A, and he also helped his club to reach the UEFA Cup final, where they were defeated by Ajax on aggregate. During the 1992–93 season, Mussi won the Coppa Italia with Torino, but the team missed out on the 1993 Supercoppa Italiana.

In 1994, Mussi returned to Parma, where he enjoyed great success. In his second spell with the Emilian club, he won the UEFA Cup twice (in 1995 and 1999), and one Coppa Italia in 1999; he also reached the Coppa Italia final in 1995, and he managed a third-place finish in Serie A in 1995, a second-place league finish in 1997, and a fourth-place finish in 1999 with Parma. He retired from football in 1999, but he briefly returned to Massese, the club with which he had made his debut, during the 2010–11 season, in the lower divisions, although he failed to make an appearance for the club during the season. Overall, Mussi played 250 matches in Serie A throughout his career.

== International career ==
At international level, Mussi won 11 caps for the Italy national football team between 1993 and 1996 under manager Sacchi. He participated at the 1994 FIFA World Cup with Italy, where they reached the final, only to lose to Brazil on penalties. He made 3 appearances during the tournament, including one in the final defeat, picking up an injury during the match; he was replaced by Luigi Apolloni. He also notably set up Roberto Baggio's last minute equaliser against Nigeria in the round of 16, which enabled the Italians to win the match in extra-time with a Baggio penalty and advance to the quarter-finals. He also took part at Euro 1996, making 3 appearances as Italy were eliminated in the group stage.

== Honours ==
Parma

- Serie C1: 1985–86
- Coppa Italia: 1998–99
- UEFA Cup: 1994–95, 1998–99

Milan

- Serie A: 1987–88
- Supercoppa Italiana: 1988
- European Cup: 1988–89

Torino

- Serie B: 1989–90
- Mitropa Cup: 1991
- Coppa Italia: 1992–93

Italy

- FIFA World Cup: 1994 (Runners-up)
