= Fernanda Lessa =

Brazilian top model (born 1977)

- Born: Fernanda Lessa; April 15, 1977 (age 49); Rio de Janeiro, Brazil
- Spouse: Luca Zocchi
- Modeling information
- Height: 178 cm (5 ft 10 in)
- Hair color: Dark brown
- Eye color: Hazel
- Website: www.fernandalessa.it

Fernanda Lessa (born April 15, 1977, in Rio de Janeiro, Brazil) is a Brazilian top model. She is 1.78 m (5 ft 10 in) tall and has brown hair and eyes. She has a tattoo on her wrist.

Lessa started her career very early on runaways, editorials, and tv commercials in Paris, New York, London, and Tokyo. Later on in life, she moved to Milan. In 2002, Lessa was featured on the cover of GQ magazine. In an ad for Alice ADSL she appeared alongside Christian Vieri and Valentino Rossi. Lessa is a professional DJ and tours famous Italian clubs with her DJ set show. She recorded two albums: Glamset By Fernanda Lessa (Stefano Cecchi Records, 2006) and Fernanda Lessa's Collection - Electro Style (Universal Records, 2007). She worked for Italian TV, hosting fashion shows and attending several chat shows. In 2007 she had her first child, Lua, fathered by Davide Dileo. Their second daughter, Ira Marie, was born in 2008. By 2010, she back to Brazil to raise her children and study acting. In 2017, Lessa married Luca Zocchi. They are still together.
