= Enrico Annoni =

Italian footballer (born 1966)

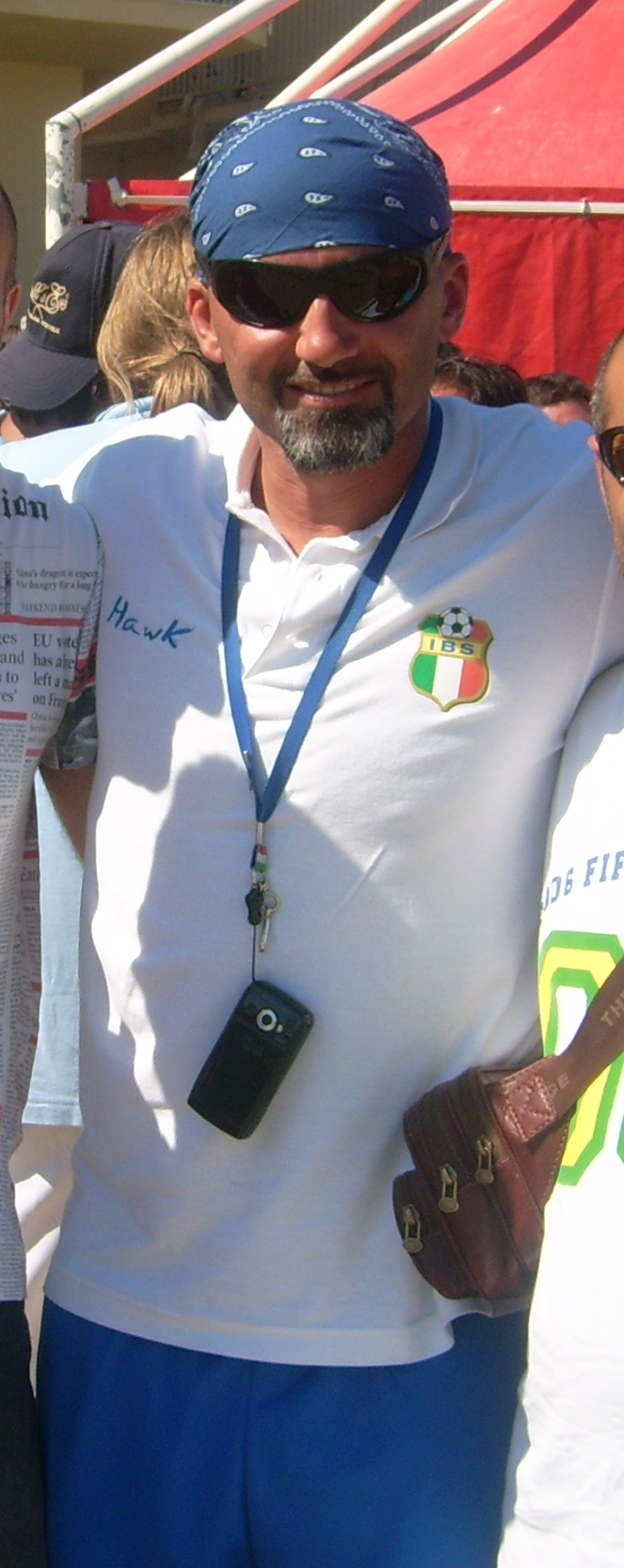
- Annoni before a beach soccer match in 2007

Personal information
- Date of birth: 10 July 1966 (age 60)
- Place of birth: Giussano, Italy
- Height: 1.78 m (5 ft 10 in)
- Position: Defender

Youth career
- Seregno

Senior career*
Years	Team	Apps	(Gls)
1982–1983	Seregno	27	(0)
1983–1990	Como	97	(2)
1985–1987	→ Sambenedettese (loan)	60	(4)
1990–1994	Torino	103	(2)
1994–1997	Roma	59	(0)
1997–1999	Celtic	37	(0)
Total		383	(8)

International career
1987–1988	Italy U21	3	(0)
- * Club domestic league appearances and goals

Enrico Annoni (born 10 July 1966) is an Italian former professional footballer who played as a defender.

He played for several years in Serie A with Como, Torino and Roma. He then moved to Scotland to play for Celtic for two years, before returning home to Italy to care for his ill father. Annoni had a brief spell as assistant coach at Padova and then at Serie B side Catania in the same role.

== Club career ==
Annoni began his career in the early 1980s as a defender with Serie D side, Seregno. In season 1983-84 he moved to Serie B side, Como and played 2 games in their successful campaign for promotion that year to Serie A. Annoni was then loaned out to Sambenedettese for two seasons before returning to Como for season 1987–88. He became a regular in the team, making 95 league appearances in 3 seasons. Annoni was now an established defender, able to play at either centre-back or full-back positions.

In 1990 Annoni joined Torino. He quickly became popular with the fans who nicknamed him 'Tarzan'. He picked up his first silverware in June 1991 when Torino beat Pisa in the final of the Mitropa Cup. He was then part of the Torino side that reached the UEFA Cup Final in 1992, playing in all the games leading up to the final and scoring in the first round against Knattspyrnufélag Reykjavíkur and second round against Boavista. Annoni played in the first leg of the final against Ajax, a 2–2 draw at home, but missed the second leg through suspension. That match finished 0–0, with Ajax winning the UEFA Cup on the away goals rule.

In June 1993 Annoni picked up his first major silverware when Torino defeated Roma on away goals in the final of the Coppa Italia.

Annoni joined Roma in 1994. He was a regular in the team in his first two seasons there, but only made 12 league appearances in his third season, 1996–97.

In February 1997 Annoni moved abroad to join Scottish Premier Division side, Celtic. During his time in Scotland, he won the Scottish Premier Division title and the Scottish League Cup. He left Celtic in July 1999 to return to Italy to care for his ill father.

Annoni made a guest appearance for Celtic in May 2008 in the benefit game for former Celtic team-mate Phil O'Donnell, who died in December 2007 whilst playing for Motherwell.

Annoni is the subject of an anecdote whereby, in a match in the late 1990s where Celtic were performing poorly and Annoni had just been brought on as a substitute, a fan is reported to have exclaimed in his native Scots; "Aw naw, no Annoni oan an aw noo!" (Oh no, not Annoni on as well now!).

== Managerial career ==
In July 2013, Annoni joined Dario Marcolin's coaching staff, becoming assistant coach at Serie B side Padova. He lasted just two months in this role, and was sacked in September along with Marcolin himself and goalkeeping coach Gaetano Petrelli.

On 3 January 2015, he followed Marcolin at Catania, becoming an assistant coach at the club.

== Honours ==
Celtic

- Scottish Premier League: 1997–98
- Scottish League Cup: 1997–98

Torino

- Coppa Italia: 1992–93
- Mitropa Cup: 1991
- UEFA Cup runner-up: 1991–92

Individual

- Torino FC Hall of Fame: 2019
