= Diego Fuser =

Italian footballer (born 1968)

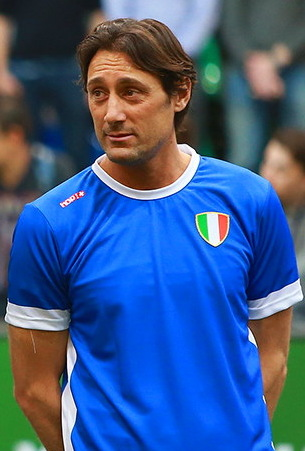
- Fuser in Italy colours, 2018

Personal information
- Full name: Diego Fuser
- Date of birth: 11 November 1968 (age 57)
- Place of birth: Venaria Reale, Italy
- Height: 1.83 m (6 ft 0 in)
- Position: Right winger

Youth career
- Torino

Senior career*
Years	Team	Apps	(Gls)
1986–1989	Torino	49	(4)
1989–1990	Milan	20	(2)
1990–1991	→ Fiorentina (loan)	32	(8)
1991–1992	Milan	15	(4)
1992–1998	Lazio	188	(35)
1998–2001	Parma	86	(10)
2001–2003	Roma	15	(2)
2003–2004	Torino	29	(2)
2004–2008	Canelli	92	(37)
2008–2009	Saviglianese	23	(6)
2009	Canelli	12	(1)
2010	Nicese	10	(4)
2012	Colline Alfieri	2	(0)
Total		573	(115)

International career
1987–1990	Italy U21	18	(2)
1989	Italy B	1	(0)
1993–2000	Italy	25	(3)

Managerial career
- 2010: Nicese
- * Club domestic league appearances and goals

Diego Fuser (Italian pronunciation: [ˈdjɛːɡo fuˈzɛr]; born 11 November 1968) is an Italian former professional footballer, who played as a midfielder, mainly on the right wing, although he was also capable of playing in the centre. Fuser was a quick, hard-working, and energetic player, with good technique, and crossing ability, who excelled at making offensive runs down the right flank and assisting strikers with accurate crosses. A tenacious and strong winger, he also possessed notable stamina, a powerful shot from distance, and was accurate from set-pieces.

== Club career ==
Born in Venaria Reale, Province of Turin, Fuser started his professional career with Torino in 1986. He played 49 games for them before moving to AC Milan (1989–92). During his two seasons at Milan he collected a UEFA Champions League (1989) medal and a Scudetto (1988), as well as the 1989 European Super Cup and Intercontinental Cup titles.

During his time at Milan, Fuser also spent time on loan at Fiorentina during the 1990–91 season, before completing a move to Lazio in 1992. This turned out to be arguably his most successful time in football becoming a fan favourite while playing 188 games in six years, scoring 35 goals and winning the Coppa Italia and reaching the UEFA Cup final in 1998, as the club's captain. After moving to Parma in 1998 he won the UEFA Cup, the Coppa Italia and the Italian Super Cup in 1999. He wore the number 14 shirt and captained the team in their 3–0 1999 UEFA Cup final victory over Olympique Marseille on 6 May.

Fuser blotted his Lazio copybook by joining AS Roma in the summer of 2001, where he only played 15 games in two seasons, winning the 2001 Supercoppa Italiana, and managing second-place finishes in Serie A in 2002, and in the Coppa Italia in 2003. During the 2003–04 season he played for his original club Torino, in Serie B.

=== In the lower leagues ===
In 2004, he signed for ASDC Canelli, whom he helped to win its Eccellenza round during the 2005–06 season, earning promotion to Serie D. In 2008, together with fellow player and personal friend Gianluigi Lentini, he moved to Saviglianese, a Promozione amateur club of Piedmont. He played also for the amateur clubs of Canelli and Nicese, which he simultaneously coached. In 2012, he played for another amateur club of Piedmont, Colline Alfieri Don Bosco in Promozione.

== International career ==
Fuser initially represented Italy at Under-21 level on 18 occasions between 1987 and 1990, scoring 2 goals; he was notably a member of the team that finished in third place at the 1990 UEFA European Under-21 Championship, under manager Cesare Maldini. He also played for the senior Italy national football team on 25 occasions between 1993 and 2000, scoring 3 goals, and he was a participant at the 1996 UEFA European Championship under manager Arrigo Sacchi, making 3 appearances as Italy were eliminated in the first found. He was also in Dino Zoff's provisional 26 man squad for UEFA Euro 2000 before missing the final cut.

== Personal life ==
Diego Fuser is married to Orietta. Their son Matteo died in 2011, at the age of 15, after struggling with illness.

== Honours ==
Milan

- Serie A: 1991–92
- European Cup: 1989–90
- European Super Cup: 1989
- Intercontinental Cup: 1989

Lazio

- Coppa Italia: 1997–98
- UEFA Cup runner-up: 1997–98

Parma

- Coppa Italia: 1998–99
- UEFA Cup: 1998–99
- Supercoppa Italiana: 1999

Roma

- Supercoppa Italiana: 2001
- Serie A runner-up: 2001–02
- Coppa Italia runner-up: 2002–03
