= ASDC Canelli =

Italian football club

Canelli
- Full name: Associazione Sportiva Dilettantistica Calcio Canelli 1922
- Founded: 1922; 104 years ago as, ASDC Canelli 1922; 2018; 8 years ago as, Canelli San Domenico Savio (merged); 2020; 6 years ago as, ASDC Canelli 1922
- Ground: Stadio Piero Sardi, Canelli, Italy
- Capacity: 500
- Chairman: Marco Gabusi
- Manager: Adamo Roberto
- League: Promozione Piedmont-Aosta Valley
- 2006–07: Serie D/A, 16th (relegated after playoffs)
Home colours	Away colours

Associazione Sportiva Dilettante Calcio Canelli 1922 is an Italian association football club located in Canelli, Piedmont. It currently plays in Promozione Piedmont-Aosta Valley.

== History ==
The team was founded in 1922.

The club gained national interest in 2004 after signing two former Italy internationals, Gianluigi Lentini and Diego Fuser, who remained at the club until 2008. Canelli were promoted from Regional Eccellenza league in 2005/2006, and played in Serie D for the first time in 38 years. However, the team was relegated back to Eccellenza after finishing 16th in Serie D and losing in relegation playoffs.

== Colors and badge ==
The colors of the club are blue and white.
