= Roberto Cravero =

Italian footballer

Personal information
- Date of birth: 3 January 1964 (age 62)
- Place of birth: Venaria Reale, Italy
- Height: 1.78 m (5 ft 10 in)
- Position: Defender

Youth career
- Torino

Senior career*
Years	Team	Apps	(Gls)
1981–1983	Torino	1	(0)
1983–1985	→ Cesena (loan)	67	(5)
1985–1992	Torino	182	(17)
1992–1995	Lazio	83	(10)
1995–1998	Torino	49	(0)
Total		383	(32)

International career
1984–1990	Italy U21	12	(1)
1987–1988	Italy U23	12	(0)
- * Club domestic league appearances and goals

Roberto Cravero (born 3 January 1964) is an Italian former professional footballer who played as a defender. He was usually deployed in the role of sweeper/libero.

== Club career ==
During his club career he played mostly for Torino (1981–1992 and 1995–1998), also playing for Serie B Cesena on loan for two seasons (1983–1985), and later for Lazio (1992–1995), where he managed to help the club to a second-place finish during the 1994–95 season. Throughout his career, he became Torino's captain, and he helped the Turin side to win the 1989–90 Serie B title, gaining promotion to Serie A the following season, as well as the 1991 Mitropa Cup. He also helped his team to a Coppa Italia final in 1982, and to reach the 1992 UEFA Cup final. He retired with Torino in Serie B in 1998.

== International career ==
Cravero played for Italy at youth level, reaching the final of the 1986 UEFA European Under-21 Championship, under manager Cesare Maldini; in total, he managed 12 appearances and 1 goal between 1984 and 1990 with the under-21 side. He never represented Italy at the senior level, however, despite being named in the Italian team that took part in the 1988 UEFA European Football Championship under Azeglio Vicini, reaching the semi-finals. He also participated in the 1988 Summer Olympics, where the Under-23 Olympic side also reached the semi-finals, finishing the tournament in fourth place; in total, he made 12 appearances with the under-23 side between 1987 and 1988.

== Honours ==
Torino

- Serie B: 1989–90
- Mitropa Cup: 1991
