= Torino FC in European football =

Italian club in European football

Torino F.C. in European football
- Club: Torino F.C.
- Seasons played: 18
- First entry: 1964–65 European Cup Winners' Cup
- Latest entry: 2019–20 UEFA Europa League

These are the matches that Torino has played in European football competitions. In UEFA European football, Torino was a finalist in the UEFA Cup in 1991–92.

== Results ==
Torino's score listed first.

=== European Cup ===
Season	Round	Club	Home	Away	Aggregate	Reference
1976–77	First Round	(Sweden) Malmö FF	2–1	1–1	3–2	
1976–77	Second Round	(Germany) Borussia Mönchengladbach	1–2	0–0	1–2	

=== European Cup Winners' Cup ===
Season	Round	Club	Home	Away	Aggregate	Reference
1964–65	First Round	(Netherlands) Fortuna Sittard	3–1	2–2	5–3	
1964–65	Second Round	(Finland) Haka	5–0	1–0	6–0	
1964–65	Quarter-Final	(Socialist Federal Republic of Yugoslavia) Dinamo Zagreb	1–1	2–1	3–2	
1964–65	Semi-Final	(West Germany) 1860 Munich	2–0	1–3	3–5, (PO 0–2)	
1968–69	First Round	(Albania) Partizani Tirana	3–1	0–1	3–2	
1968–69	Second Round	Given Bye				
1968–69	Quarter-Final	(Czechoslovakia) Slovan Bratislava	0–1	1–2	1–3	
1971–72	First Round	(Republic of Ireland) Limerick	4–0	1–0	5–0	
1971–72	Second Round	Austria Wien	1–0	0–0	1–0	
1971–72	Quarter-Final	(Scotland) Rangers	1–1	0–1	1–2	
1993–94	First Round	(Norway) Lillestrøm	1–2	2–0	3–2	
1993–94	Second Round	(Scotland) Aberdeen	3–2	2–1	5–3	
1993–94	Quarter-Final	(England) Arsenal	0–0	0–1	0–1	

=== UEFA Cup and Europa League ===
Season	Round	Club	Home	Away	Aggregate	Reference
1972–73	First Round	(Spain) Las Palmas	2–0	0–4	2–4	
1973–74	First Round	(East Germany) Lokomotive Leipzig	1–2	1–2	2–4	
1974–75	First Round	(West Germany) Fortuna Düsseldorf	1–1	1–3	2–4	
1977–78	First Round	(Cyprus) APOEL	3–0	1–1	4–1	
1977–78	Second Round	(Socialist Federal Republic of Yugoslavia) Dinamo Zagreb	3–1	0–1	3–2	
1977–78	Third Round	(France) Bastia	2–3	1–2	3–5	
1978–79	First Round	(Spain) Sporting Gijón	1–0	0–3	1–3	
1979–80	First Round	(West Germany) VfB Stuttgart	2–1	0–1	2–2 (a)	
1980–81 (Note: Extraordinary participation in substitution of disqualified AC Milan.)	First Round	(Belgium) Molenbeek	2–2 (a.e.t.)	2–1	4–3	
1980–81	Second Round	(East Germany) Magdeburg	3–1	0–1	3–2	
1980–81	Third Round	(Switzerland) Grasshopper	2–1	1–2	3–3 (3–4 pen.)	
1985–86	First Round	(Greece) Panathinaikos	2–1	1–1	3–2	
1985–86	Second Round	(Socialist Federal Republic of Yugoslavia) Hajduk Split	1–1	1–3	2–4	
1986–87	First Round	(France) Nantes	1–1	4–0	5–1	
1986–87	Second Round	(Hungary) Győr	4–0	1–1	5–1	
1986–87	Third Round	(Belgium) Beveren	2–1	1–0	3–1	
1986–87	Quarter-Final	(Austria) Wacker Innsbruck	0–0	1–2	1–2	
1991–92	First Round	(Iceland) KR	6–1	2–0	8–1	
1991–92	Second Round	(Portugal) Boavista	2–0	0–0	2–0	
1991–92	Third Round	(Greece) AEK Athens	1–0	2–2	3–2	
1991–92	Quarter-Final	(Denmark) Copenhagen	1–0	2–0	3–0	
1991–92	Semi-Final	(Spain) Real Madrid	2–0	1–2	3–2	
1991–92	Final	(Netherlands) Ajax	2–2	0–0	2–2 (a)	
1992–93	First Round	(Sweden) Norrköping	3–0	0–1	3–1	
1992–93	Second Round	(Russia) Dynamo Moscow	1–2	0–0	1–2	
2014–15 (Note: Extraordinary participation in substitution of disqualified Parma FC.)	Third Qualifying Round	(Sweden) Brommapojkarna	4–0	3–0	7–0	
2014–15	Play-off Round	(Croatia) RNK Split	1–0	0–0	1–0	
2014–15	Group B	(Belgium) Club Brugge	0–0	0–0	2nd	
2014–15	Group B	(Denmark) Copenhagen	1–0	5–1	2nd	
2014–15	Group B	(Finland) HJK Helsinki	2–0	1–2	2nd	
2014–15	Round of 32	(Spain) Athletic Bilbao	2–2	3–2	5–4	
2014–15	Round of 16	(Russia) Zenit Saint Petersburg	1–0	0–2	1–2	
2019–20 (Note: Extraordinary participation in substitution of disqualified AC Milan.)	Second Qualifying Round	(Hungary) Debrecen	3–0	4–1	7–1	
2019–20	Third Qualifying Round	(Belarus) Shakhtyor Soligorsk	5–0	1–1	6–1	
2019–20	Play-off Round	(England) Wolverhampton Wanderers	2–3	1–2	3–5	

=== UEFA Intertoto Cup ===
Season	Round	Club	Home	Away	Aggregate	Reference
2002	Second Round	(Austria) Bregenz	1–0	1–1	2–1	
2002	Third Round	(Spain) Villarreal	2–0	0–2	2–2 (3–4 pen.)	

== FIFA-only recognized seasonal competitions ==
=== Inter-Cities Fairs Cup ===
Season	Round	Club	Home	Away	Aggregate
1965–66	First Round	(England) Leeds United	0–0	1–2	1–2

== Overall record ==
=== By competition ===
As of 29 August 2019

Competition	Played	Won	Drew	Lost	GF	GA	GD	Win%
European Champions' Cup/UEFA Champions League	4	1	2	1	4	4	+0	25.00
Cup Winners' Cup	25	12	5	8	36	23	+13	48.00
UEFA Cup/Europa League	70	32	18	20	112	70	+42	45.71
UEFA Intertoto Cup	4	2	1	1	4	3	+1	50.00
Total	103	47	26	30	156	100	+56	45.63

Source: UEFA.com
Pld = Matches played; W = Matches won; D = Matches drawn; L = Matches lost; GF = Goals for; GA = Goals against; GD = Goal Difference.

=== By Club ===
Key

Positive balance (more wins than losses)
Neutral balance (as many wins as losses)
Negative balance (more losses than wins)

Club	Played	Won	Drew	Lost	GF	GA	GD	Win%
(Scotland) Aberdeen	2	2	0	0	5	3	+2	100.00
(Greece) AEK Athens	2	1	1	0	3	2	+1	50.00
(Netherlands) Ajax	2	0	2	0	2	2	+0	0.00
(Cyprus) APOEL	2	1	1	0	4	1	+3	50.00
(England) Arsenal	2	0	1	1	0	1	−1	0.00
(Spain) Athletic Bilbao	2	1	1	0	5	4	+1	50.00
Austria Wien	2	1	1	0	1	0	+1	50.00
(France) Bastia	2	0	0	2	3	5	−2	0.00
(Belgium) Beveren	2	2	0	0	3	1	+2	100.00
(Portugal) Boavista	2	1	1	0	2	0	+2	50.00
(Germany) Borussia Mönchengladbach	2	0	1	1	1	2	−1	0.00
(Austria) Bregenz	2	1	1	0	2	1	+1	50.00
(Sweden) BP	2	2	0	0	7	0	+7	100.00
(Belgium) Club Brugge	2	0	2	0	0	0	+0	0.00
(Denmark) Copenhagen	4	4	0	0	9	1	+8	100.00
(Hungary) Debrecen	2	2	0	0	7	1	+6	100.00
(Croatia) Dinamo Zagreb	4	2	1	1	6	4	+2	50.00
(Russia) Dynamo Moscow	2	0	1	1	1	2	−1	0.00
(Germany) Fortuna Düsseldorf	2	0	1	1	2	4	−2	0.00
(Netherlands) Fortuna Sittard	2	1	1	0	5	3	+2	50.00
(Switzerland) Grasshopper	2	1	0	1	3	3	+0	50.00
(Hungary) Győr	2	1	1	0	5	1	+4	50.00
(Croatia) Hajduk Split	2	0	1	1	2	4	−2	0.00
(Finland) Haka	2	2	0	0	6	0	+6	100.00
(Finland) HJK	2	1	0	1	3	2	+1	50.00
(Iceland) KR	2	2	0	0	8	1	+7	100.00
(Spain) Las Palmas	2	1	0	1	2	4	−2	50.00
(England) Leeds	2	0	1	1	1	2	−1	0.00
(Norway) Lillestrøm	2	1	0	1	3	2	+1	50.00
(Republic of Ireland) Limerick	2	2	0	0	5	0	+5	100.00
(Germany) Lokomotive Leipzig	2	0	0	2	2	4	−2	0.00
(Germany) Magdeburg	2	1	0	1	3	2	+1	50.00
(Sweden) Malmö	2	1	1	0	3	2	+1	50.00
(Belgium) Molenbeek	2	1	1	0	4	3	+1	50.00
(Germany) 1860 Munich	3	1	0	2	3	5	−2	33.33
(France) Nantes	2	1	1	0	5	1	+4	50.00
(Sweden) Norrköping	2	1	0	1	3	1	+2	50.00
(Greece) Panathinaikos	2	1	1	0	3	2	+1	50.00
(Albania) Partizani Tirana	2	1	0	1	3	2	+1	50.00
(Scotland) Rangers	2	0	1	1	1	2	−1	0.00
(Spain) Real Madrid	2	1	0	1	3	2	+1	50.00
(Croatia) RNK Split	2	1	1	0	1	0	+1	50.00
(Belarus) Shakhtyor Soligorsk	2	1	1	0	6	1	+5	50.00
(Slovakia) Slovan Bratislava	2	0	0	2	1	3	−2	0.00
(Spain) Sporting Gijon	2	1	0	1	1	3	−2	50.00
(Germany) Stuttgart	2	1	0	1	1	3	−2	50.00
(Spain) Villarreal	2	1	0	1	2	2	+0	50.00
(Austria) Wacker Innsbruck	2	0	1	1	1	2	−1	0.00
(England) Wolverhampton Wanderers	2	0	0	2	3	5	−2	0.00
(Russia) Zenit	2	1	0	1	1	2	−1	50.00

=== By country ===
As of 29 August 2019

Country	Played	Won	Drew	Lost	GF	GA	GD	Win%
Albania	2	1	0	1	3	2	+1	50.00
Austria	6	2	3	1	4	3	+1	33.33
Belarus	2	1	1	0	6	1	+5	50.00
Belgium	6	3	2	1	6	5	+1	50.00
Croatia	8	3	3	2	9	8	+1	37.50
Cyprus	2	1	1	0	4	1	+3	50.00
Denmark	4	4	0	0	9	1	+8	100.00
England	6	0	2	4	4	8	−4	0.00
Finland	4	3	0	1	9	2	+7	75.00
France	4	1	1	2	8	6	+2	25.00
Germany	13	3	2	8	13	19	−6	23.08
Greece	4	2	2	0	6	4	+2	50.00
Hungary	4	3	1	0	12	2	+10	75.00
Iceland	2	2	0	0	8	1	+7	100.00
Ireland	2	2	0	0	5	0	+5	100.00
Netherlands	4	1	3	0	7	5	+2	25.00
Norway	2	1	0	1	3	2	+1	50.00
Portugal	2	1	1	0	2	0	+2	50.00
Russia	4	1	1	2	2	4	−2	25.00
Scotland	4	2	1	1	6	5	+1	50.00
Slovakia	2	0	0	2	1	3	−2	0.00
Spain	10	5	1	4	13	15	−2	50.00
Sweden	6	4	1	1	13	3	+10	66.67
Switzerland	2	1	0	1	3	3	+0	50.00
