= Gianluigi Lentini =

Italian footballer (born 1969)

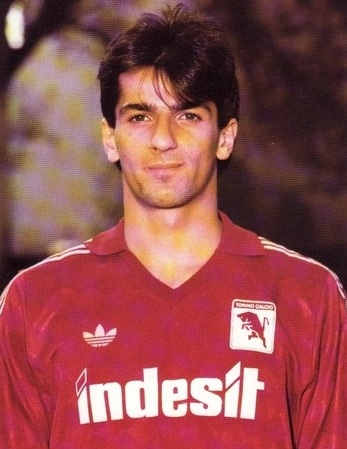
- Lentini in 1989

Personal information
- Date of birth: 27 March 1969 (age 57)
- Place of birth: Carmagnola, Italy
- Height: 1.80 m (5 ft 11 in)
- Position: Winger

Youth career
- Torino

Senior career*
Years	Team	Apps	(Gls)
1986–1992	Torino	111	(16)
1988–1989	→ Ancona (loan)	37	(4)
1992–1996	Milan	60	(13)
1996–1997	Atalanta	31	(4)
1997–2001	Torino	93	(6)
2001–2004	Cosenza	84	(9)
2004–2008	Canelli	74	(37)
2008–2009	Saviglianese	30	(5)
2009–2011	Nicese	9	(2)
2011–2012	Carmagnola		
Total		529	(96)

International career
1987–1990	Italy U21	2	(0)
1991–1996	Italy	13	(0)
- * Club domestic league appearances and goals

Gianluigi Lentini (Italian pronunciation: [dʒanluˈiːdʒi lenˈtiːni]; born 27 March 1969) is an Italian former professional footballer who played as a winger.

Once dubbed the "new Gigi Meroni", Lentini began his senior career with hometown club Torino in 1986, with whom he won a Serie B title and the Mitropa Cup; in 1992, Lentini became the then-most expensive player when he joined Milan in a transfer worth a reported 18.5 billion Italian lire (€14 million), where he won three Serie A titles, three Supercoppas Italiana, and the UEFA Champions League. He suffered a serious car crash in 1993, which derailed his career.

== Club career ==
=== Torino ===
==== 1986–1992: Hometown hero and team success ====
Born in Carmagnola, Piedmont, to Sicilian parents, Lentini grew up playing in the Torino youth system. After occasional appearances for the senior side, he spent the 1988–89 season on loan with Serie B club Ancona. He returned to Torino the following year and scored six goals as they won the Serie B title and were promoted to Serie A. Under new coach Emiliano Mondonico and the transfer outlay by owner Gian Mauro Borsano to acquire Rafael Martín Vázquez to complement a team containing Lentini and other academy products Luca Marchegiani and Giorgio Bresciani, Torino won the Mitropa Cup in 1991 and finished in fifth place.

In the following year, following the arrivals of Enzo Scifo and Walter Casagrande, Torino reached the 1992 UEFA Cup final (with Lentini integral in the semi-final second leg victory over Real Madrid) and finish in third-place in Serie A; he also extended his contract until June 1995. However, Torino's financial difficulties (and protest regarding a proposed transfer to city rivals Juventus) led to Lentini signing for Milan on a reported four-year contract for a then-world record transfer fee of 18.5 billion Italian lire (an estimated €14 million by fixed exchange rate) in 1992; Borsano reportedly pocketed an estimated 7.5 billion lire (€3.7 million) from the transfer.

=== Milan ===
==== 1992–1994: Initial success and car crash ====
Lentini became a key component for Milan during the 1992–93 season under manager Fabio Capello, scoring seven league goals as he won his first league title and the 1992 Supercoppa Italiana, although he suffered from a poor performance as Milan lost the UEFA Champions League final to Marseille. Following a pre-season tournament in Genoa that August, Lentini, aged 24, was traveling at a reported 125 mph in a canary-yellow Porsche 911 that crashed along the A21 highway; he was driving from Genoa to Turin to see his then-girlfriend, Rita Bonaccorso, the then-wife of Juventus striker Salvatore Schillaci.

Lentini (whose car tire suffered a puncture and was replaced by a service station attendant with a skinnier wheel not meant to exceed 50 mph) was dragged from the wreckage seconds before it caught fire and was placed in an induced coma for two days; he fractured his skull and damaged an eye socket. He returned to the pitch at the end of the 1993–94 season, playing sporadically as Milan retained their league title, won the Champions League, and finished runners-up in the Intercontinental Cup.

==== 1994–1996: Poor form and departure ====
Lentini suffered long-term effects to his memory and vision from the crash, and had a notable decline in form and playing time; former teammate Marcel Desailly said, "You could see the skills, how he was before the crash and after the crash. Everything was completely different". His career in Milan then fizzled out, playing irregularly for three seasons and scoring only six league goals as the club won another league title. He departed in 1996 after his contract expired.

=== Later career ===
In 1996, he moved from Milan to Atalanta for a season, helping the club to a mid-table finish alongside Filippo Inzaghi. He returned to Torino in 1997, spending three seasons with the club; during the 1998–99 Serie B season, he helped his side to earn to promotion to Serie A the following season, where they once again would face relegation. He left in 2001 and subsequently played several seasons in the lower divisions with various other clubs, including Cosenza, the phoenix club Cosenza, Canelli, Saviglianese, Nicese and Carmagnola, before retiring in 2012, aged 43.

== International career ==
Lentini initially made two appearances with the Italy national under-21 football team between 1987 and 1990, making his debut on 29 November 1989; he was a member of the squad that reached the semi-finals of the 1990 UEFA European Under-21 Championship, under manager Cesare Maldini, eventually finishing the tournament in third place. Whilst at Torino, he gained his first senior cap for the Italy national football team, in an international friendly in Terni against Belgium on 13 February 1991, which ended in a 0–0 draw. He later became a regular member of Arrigo Sacchi's Italy side during the 1994 FIFA World Cup qualifying campaign, although he would miss out on the final tournament due to his inconsistent performances following his serious car crash in August 1993. He was capped on 13 occasions in total, making his last appearance on 6 November 1996.

== Style of play ==
"He was a really big talent… Fast, strong, physical. Really good."

— Former AC Milan manager Fabio Capello on Lentini's ability prior to his crash in 1993.

During his prime, Lentini was considered a highly talented prospect, known for his pace, mobility, work-rate, physical strength, intelligence and leadership. Although he was usually deployed as a left winger, he was capable of playing on either flank. He was highly regarded for his creativity, his excellent technical ability, agility, speed, balance, and his dribbling skills, as well as his crossing ability, which made him an extremely effective attacking threat on the wing, and allowed him to beat opponents in one on one situations and subsequently provide assists for his teammates.

== Personal life ==
Lentini was married to Alexandra Carlsson, a model from Sweden; their son, Nicholas, was born in 1996. Nicholas plays as a goalkeeper.

== Honours ==
Torino

- Serie B: 1989–90, 2000–01
- Mitropa Cup: 1991

Milan

- Serie A: 1992–93, 1993–94, 1995–96
- Supercoppa Italiana: 1992, 1993, 1994
- UEFA Champions League: 1993–94; runner-up: 1992–93

Italy

- Scania 100 Tournament: 1991
