= Gianluca Sordo =

Italian footballer (born 1969)

Personal information
- Date of birth: 2 December 1969 (age 56)
- Place of birth: Carrara, Italy
- Height: 1.78 m (5 ft 10 in)
- Position: Midfielder

Senior career*
Years	Team	Apps	(Gls)
1987–1994	Torino	117	(7)
1988–1989	→ Trento (loan)	25	(1)
1994–1996	Milan	12	(0)
1996–1997	Reggiana	7	(0)
1997–1999	Bari	12	(0)
1998–1999	→ Palermo (loan)	23	(2)
1999	Cannes	7	(0)
1999–2000	Montevarchi	7	(0)
2000–2001	Pisa	27	(3)
2001–2003	Arezzo	23	(1)
2003–2004	Aglianese	27	(2)
Total		287	(16)

International career
1989–1992	Italy U21	18	(2)
- * Club domestic league appearances and goals

Gianluca Sordo (born 2 December 1969) is an Italian former professional footballer who played as a defensive midfielder.

== Club career ==
Sordo was born in Carrara, Tuscany. He made his professional debuts at not yet 18 with Torino FC, remaining seven seasons with the club. In the final of the 1991–92 UEFA Cup, in the dying minutes of the second leg against AFC Ajax, after a 2–2 draw in Italy, he hit the post in an eventual 0–0 draw (and aggregate loss). In 1993, he appeared in both legs of Toro's conquest of the Coppa Italia, a 5–5 aggregate win over A.S. Roma.

Sordo moved to Serie A giants A.C. Milan for 1994–95, being rarely used by Fabio Capello over the course of two seasons. Subsequently, he did not settle with a team, playing with A.C. Reggiana 1919, A.S. Bari and U.S. Città di Palermo, and also briefly represented AS Cannes in the French Ligue 2.

Sordo retired from football at the age of 34, most of his last years being spent in the lower leagues.

== International career ==
Sordo represented Italy under-21s during three years, helping it win the 1992 UEFA European Championship.

Later that year, he played Olympic football in Barcelona with Italy, appearing in three games in an eventual round-of-16 exit at the hands of eventual champions and hosts Spain.

== Personal life ==
In early April 2005, he fell into a coma after being attacked by two men in a bar in Marina di Massa, in his native region.

== Honours ==
=== Club ===
Torino

- Coppa Italia: 1992–93; Runner-up 1987–88
- UEFA Cup: Runner-up 1991–92

Milan

- Serie A: 1995–96
- Supercoppa Italiana: 1994
- UEFA Super Cup: 1994

=== International ===
Italy U-21

- UEFA European Under-21 Football Championship: 1992
