= Giorgio Venturin =

Italian footballer (born 1968)

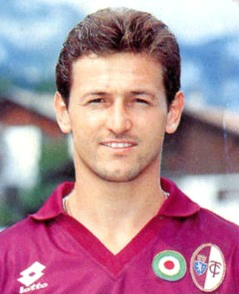
- Venturin with Torino

Personal information
- Full name: Giorgio Venturin
- Date of birth: 9 July 1968 (age 58)
- Place of birth: Bollate, Italy
- Height: 1.72 m (5 ft 8 in)
- Position: Midfielder

Youth career
- Torino

Senior career*
Years	Team	Apps	(Gls)
1987–1994	Torino	124	(4)
1988–1989	→ Cosenza (loan)	30	(5)
1990–1991	→ Napoli (loan)	31	(0)
1994–1999	Lazio	80	(2)
1995–1996	→ Cagliari (loan)	31	(0)
1999–2000	Atlético Madrid	17	(0)
2000–2002	Torino	15	(1)
2002–2003	Taranto	18	(0)
2004	Lodigiani	14	(0)
2004–2005	Cisco Lodigiani	24	(0)

International career
1992	Italy	1	(0)
- * Club domestic league appearances and goals

Giorgio Venturin (Italian pronunciation: [ˈdʒordʒo ventuˈrin]; born 9 July 1968) is an Italian former professional footballer who played as a central or defensive midfielder.

== Career ==
Venturin started his playing career in the Torino youth system, and was subsequently loaned to Serie B side Cosenza for a season in 1988. He returned to Torino in 1989, making 28 appearances and scoring a single goal. After a single season at Napoli, he returned once again to Turin and played three seasons with the Granata. During his stay with Torino, he received his only cap with the Italian team in 1992; he appeared as a second half substitute for Luca Fusi in Italy's 2–0 friendly win over Republic of Ireland at the Foxboro Stadium in the 1992 U.S. Cup, on 4 June. In 1994 he moved to Lazio, where he played until January 1999, except for a loan spell at Cagliari in 1995. He left Lazio to join La Liga side Atlético Madrid during the 1998–99 winter transfer market. He returned to Italy in 2000 to play for his boyhood club Torino. He finally left Torino in 2002 to sign for Taranto, and retired in 2005 after 1 1/2 seasons with Lodigiani and its successor Cisco Lodigiani of Serie C2. After retiring, he became involved with the Cisco Roma (ex-Cisco Lodigiani) youth system.
