= 1989–90 Serie B =

Italian football league season

Serie B
- Season: 1989–90
- Champions: Torino; 2nd title
- Promoted: Pisa; Cagliari; Parma
- Relegated: Monza; Licata; Como; Catanzaro
- Matches: 380
- Goals: 674 (1.77 per match)
- Top goalscorer: Andrea Silenzi (23 goals)

Serie B 1989-90 team distribution

The Serie B 1989–90 was the fifty-eighth tournament of this competition played in Italy since its creation.

== Teams ==
Triestina, Reggiana, Cagliari and Foggia had been promoted from Serie C, while Torino, Pescara, Pisa and Como had been relegated from Serie A.

== Final classification ==
Pos	Team	Pld	W	D	L	GF	GA	GD	Pts	Promotion or relegation
1	Torino (P, C)	38	19	15	4	63	24	+39	53	Promotion to Serie A
2	Pisa (P)	38	16	19	3	51	23	+28	51	Promotion to Serie A
3	Cagliari (P)	38	17	13	8	39	22	+17	47	Promotion to Serie A
4	Parma (P)	38	16	14	8	49	30	+19	46	Promotion to Serie A
5	Ancona	38	13	17	8	46	34	+12	43	
6	Reggina	38	13	16	9	32	27	+5	42	
7	Reggiana	38	11	18	9	33	31	+2	40	
8	Foggia	38	15	9	14	45	38	+7	39	
8	Pescara	38	14	11	13	34	39	−5	39	
10	Brescia	38	10	17	11	31	34	−3	37	
10	Padova	38	12	13	13	26	33	−7	37	
12	Avellino	38	12	11	15	33	35	−2	35	
12	Triestina	38	9	17	12	33	41	−8	35	
14	Cosenza	38	9	16	13	27	40	−13	34	
15	Barletta	38	9	16	13	24	37	−13	34	
16	Messina	38	11	12	15	28	44	−16	34	Relegation tie-breaker (Note: Qualified to the relegation tie-breaker for worst head-to-head points against Cosenza and Barletta.)
17	Monza (R)	38	11	12	15	26	37	−11	34	Serie C1 after tie-breaker
18	Licata (R)	38	6	16	16	22	38	−16	28	Relegation to Serie C1
19	Como (R)	38	7	13	18	16	32	−16	27	Relegation to Serie C1
20	Catanzaro (R)	38	3	19	16	16	35	−19	25	Relegation to Serie C1

Source: Head-to-head points used for three or more clubs finishing at the same result.
(C) Champions; (P) Promoted; (R) Relegated

== Results ==
Home \ Away	ANC	AVE	BRL	BRE	CAG	CTZ	COM	COS	FOG	LIC	MES	MON	PAD	PAR	PES	PIS	REA	REG	TOR	TRI
Ancona		1–0	3–1	0–0	1–1	0–0	4–0	1–1	1–3	1–0	5–0	0–1	1–1	1–0	1–1	1–1	1–1	0–0	0–1	0–0
Avellino	0–0		0–1	1–2	2–0	1–0	1–0	4–0	0–1	1–0	1–0	2–0	1–0	0–1	1–1	0–3	0–0	2–0	1–1	1–1
Barletta	1–1	0–2		1–1	0–0	0–0	1–0	1–1	1–0	0–0	3–0	1–0	1–0	1–0	1–0	1–1	0–1	1–1	1–0	0–0
Brescia	2–3	1–1	4–0		1–2	0–0	0–0	2–1	2–1	1–0	1–1	0–0	2–1	0–1	0–0	1–4	0–0	1–1	1–1	1–0
Cagliari	0–0	2–0	2–1	0–0		4–1	1–0	0–0	0–0	3–0	3–0	3–0	1–0	2–2	2–0	1–0	1–1	1–0	0–0	1–1
Catanzaro	2–3	0–0	0–0	1–2	0–1		0–0	0–0	0–1	1–1	0–1	1–1	0–1	1–4	0–1	1–0	1–1	0–0	0–1	1–1
Como	0–2	1–2	2–0	0–0	0–1	0–0		1–0	2–0	2–0	0–0	0–1	2–0	0–0	0–1	0–0	0–0	1–1	0–0	1–2
Cosenza	2–0	1–0	1–0	2–0	0–2	0–0	2–0		2–0	1–1	2–0	0–0	0–0	1–0	2–0	1–4	1–2	0–0	1–1	1–1
Foggia	1–1	1–2	1–1	3–1	0–1	1–0	1–0	2–0		0–0	3–1	1–0	4–0	1–2	3–0	0–0	0–0	0–0	0–1	3–2
Licata	1–0	0–0	4–0	0–0	1–0	0–0	0–0	0–0	3–0		1–1	0–2	0–1	0–3	0–0	0–0	1–0	2–3	1–1	1–0
Messina	3–1	2–0	0–0	0–2	1–0	1–0	1–0	1–0	0–2	1–1		1–0	1–2	1–1	1–1	0–0	1–2	0–1	2–0	1–0
Monza	1–3	1–1	2–1	0–0	0–1	1–1	0–1	1–1	1–1	2–0	0–0		1–0	1–1	2–0	2–2	1–0	1–0	2–0	1–0
Padova	1–2	0–0	1–0	2–0	2–0	0–0	0–0	3–1	0–2	0–0	1–0	2–0		1–0	1–1	0–0	0–0	1–1	1–1	1–1
Parma	1–1	2–1	1–0	0–0	1–1	2–0	0–0	5–1	5–3	4–1	2–2	1–0	0–1		1–0	0–2	2–0	0–2	1–1	0–0
Pescara	0–0	2–1	2–1	1–0	0–0	0–1	1–0	3–0	2–1	1–0	2–0	0–0	0–0	2–0		1–4	4–0	1–1	2–0	2–0
Pisa	1–0	2–1	0–0	2–1	2–2	1–1	1–0	0–0	2–0	3–1	2–1	3–0	1–0	2–2	3–0		2–1	0–0	0–0	0–0
Reggiana	1–1	1–0	1–1	0–0	2–0	0–1	2–0	2–1	2–2	0–0	2–2	2–0	4–0	0–2	1–0	0–0		1–1	0–0	3–0
Reggina	0–2	4–1	0–0	0–1	1–0	3–1	2–1	0–0	2–0	2–1	0–1	1–0	0–1	0–0	2–1	0–0	1–0		0–0	2–1
Torino	4–1	2–2	3–0	2–1	1–0	2–1	5–0	3–0	1–0	2–0	3–0	4–0	3–1	0–0	7–0	2–1	4–0	2–0		1–1
Triestina	1–3	1–0	2–2	2–0	1–0	0–0	0–2	0–0	0–3	2–1	0–0	2–1	2–0	0–2	2–1	2–2	0–0	2–0	3–3	

Source: Almanacco Illustrato del Calcio - La Storia 1898-2004, Panini Edizioni, Modena, September 2005
Legend: Blue = home team win; Yellow = draw; Red = away team win.

== Relegation tie-breaker ==
7 June 1990

Messina	1–0	Monza
Doni 8'

Stadio Adriatico, Pescara
Attendance: 13,000
Referee: Gianni Beschin

Monza relegated to Serie C1.

== Season tickets ==
The season ticket sales as they were before the beginning of the season:

Source: Attendance Statistics of Serie B (2nd Div) 1989-1990

Rank	Club	Tickets
1	Torino	18.083
2	Avellino	8.189
3	Foggia	6.632
4	Pescara	4.067
5	Triestina	4.052
6	Cagliari	3.636
7	Barletta	2.798
8	Brescia	2.582
9	Parma	2.570
10	Pisa	2.014
11	Cosenza	1.973
12	Padova	1.854
13	Como	1.296
14	Ancona	1.203
15	Catanzaro	722
	Messina	n/a
	Monza	n/a
	Reggina	n/a
	Reggiana	n/a
	Licata	n/a

== Attendances ==
#	Club	Average
1	Torino	30,198
2	Cagliari	18,056
3	Foggia	13,633
4	Pescara	12,574
5	Reggina	11,712
6	Avellino	11,226
7	Brescia	10,167
8	Parma	10,039
9	Reggiana	9,552
10	Cosenza	9,137
11	Pisa	9,116
12	Padova	8,668
13	Ancona	8,417
14	Messina	7,534
15	Triestina	7,494
16	Monza	6,353
17	Barletta	5,909
18	Catanzaro	5,266
19	Como	4,702
20	Licata	3,072

== References and sources ==
- Almanacco Illustrato del Calcio - La Storia 1898-2004, Panini Edizioni, Modena, September 2005
