= Giorgio Bresciani =

Italian footballer

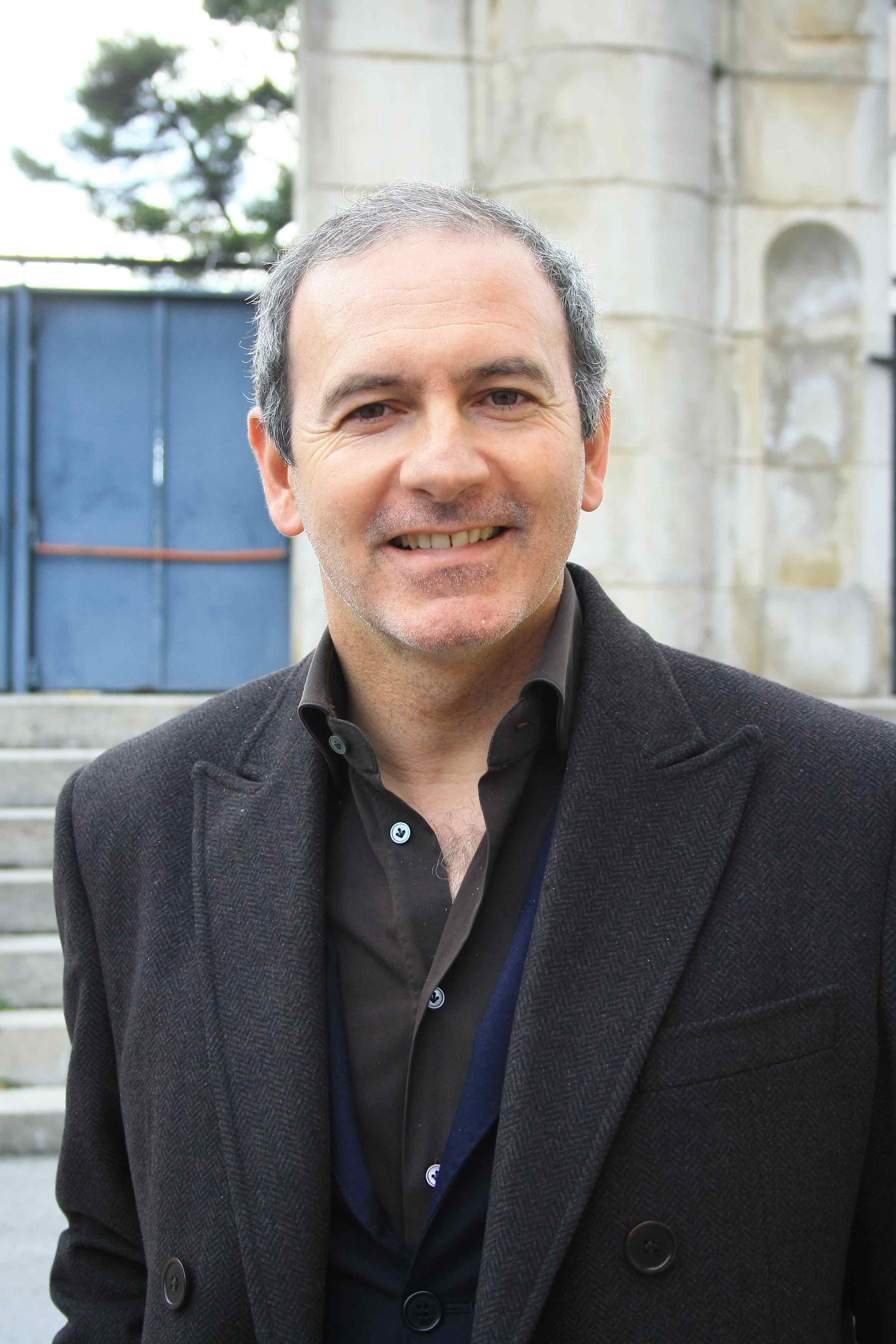

Personal information
- Date of birth: 23 April 1969 (age 57)
- Place of birth: Lucca, Italy
- Height: 1.73 m (5 ft 8 in)
- Position: Striker

Youth career
- Torino

Senior career*
Years	Team	Apps	(Gls)
1986–1992	Torino	95	(22)
1989–1990	→ Atalanta (loan)	18	(4)
1992	Cagliari	4	(0)
1993–1994	Napoli	22	(1)
1994	Reggiana	5	(1)
1995–1996	Bologna	55	(8)
1996–1997	Cremonese	19	(4)
1997	Ancona	10	(1)
1998	Siena	16	(3)
1998–1999	Trento	10	(2)
2000	Sangiovannese	3	(1)
2001	Juve Stabia	3	(0)
2005–2006	Colligiana	1	(0)
Total		261	(47)
- * Club domestic league appearances and goals

Giorgio Bresciani (born 23 April 1969 in Lucca) is an Italian former professional footballer who played as a forward.
