= 1986–87 Hellas Verona season =

Hellas Verona
1986–87 season
- Manager: Osvaldo Bagnoli
- Serie A: 4th
- Coppa Italia: Last 16
- Top goalscorer: Preben Elkjær (8)

Hellas Verona F.C. came back strongly following its disappointing defense of the 1985 Serie A crown, with a fourth place and European qualification. A notable signing prior to the season was former World Cup hero Paolo Rossi, who spent his final footballing season at Hellas, scoring four goals.

== Squad ==
=== Goalkeepers ===
- (Italy) Giuliano Giuliani
- (Italy) Stefano Vavoli

=== Defenders ===
- (Italy) Luigi De Agostini
- (Italy) Mauro Ferroni
- (Italy) Silvano Fontolan
- (Italy) Fabio Marangon
- (Italy) Roberto Tricella

=== Midfielders ===
- (Italy) Luciano Bruni
- (Italy) Antonio Di Gennaro
- (Italy) Roberto Galia
- (Italy) Mauro Roberto
- (Italy) Luigi Sacchetti
- (Italy) Walter Ugolini
- (Italy) Vinicio Verza
- (Italy) Domenico Volpati
- (Italy) Vittorino Zinelli

=== Attackers ===
- (Denmark) Preben Elkjær
- (Italy) Ferdinando Gasparini
- (Italy) Marco Pacione
- (Italy) Paolo Rossi

== Competitions ==
=== Serie A ===
==== League table ====
Pos	Team	Pld	W	D	L	GF	GA	GD	Pts	Qualification or relegation
2	Juventus	30	14	11	5	42	27	+15	39	Qualification to UEFA Cup
3	Inter Milan	30	15	8	7	32	17	+15	38	Qualification to UEFA Cup
4	Hellas Verona	30	12	12	6	36	25	+11	36	Qualification to UEFA Cup
5	Milan (Note: Milan won the UEFA Cup qualification match against Sampdoria 1–0, thus qualifying for the 1987–88 UEFA Cup.)	30	13	9	8	31	21	+10	35	Qualification to UEFA Cup
6	Sampdoria	30	13	9	8	37	21	+16	35	

Source: 1986–87 Serie A, RSSSF.com
Rules for classification: 1) Points; 2) Head-to-head points; 3) Head-to-head goal difference; 4) Goal difference; 5) Goals scored; 6) Draw. (Note: Head-to-head record is used only after all the matches between the teams in question have been played).

==== Matches ====
14 September 1986 1	Torino	2–1	Hellas Verona	Turin
	Kieft 9'; Comi 72'	Report	Galia 86'	Stadium: Stadio Comunale; Referee: Longhi

21 September 1986 2	Hellas Verona	1–0	AC Milan	Verona
	Galia 45'	Report		Stadium: Marcantonio Bentegodi; Referee: Paparesta

28 September 1986 3	Roma	0–0	Hellas Verona	Rome
		Report		Stadium: Olimpico; Referee: Pairetto

5 October 1986 4	Hellas Verona	1–1	Sampdoria	Verona
	Galia 31'	Report	Vialli 19' (pen.)	Stadium: Marcantonio Bentegodi; Referee: D'Elia

12 October 1986 5	Udinese	2–2	Hellas Verona	Udine
	Graziani 9' 26'	Report	Verza 7' 43'	Stadium: Friuli; Referee: Lombardo

19 October 1986 6	Hellas Verona	2–2	Avellino	Verona
	Rossi 23' (pen.); Pacione 29'	Report	Dirceu 28'; Alessio 64'	Stadium: Marcantonio Bentegodi; Referee: Baldas

26 October 1986 7	Fiorentina	0–1	Hellas Verona	Florence
		Report	Pacione 65'	Stadium: Comunale; Referee: Lo Bello

2 November 1986 8	Hellas Verona	2–1	Atalanta	Verona
	Di Gennaro 44'; Galia 54'	Report	Magrin 42'	Stadium: Marcantonio Bentegodi; Referee: Baldi

9 November 1986 9	Empoli	1–0	Hellas Verona	Empoli
	Vertova 51'	Report		Stadium: Carlo Castellani; Referee: Lombardo

23 November 1986 10	Hellas Verona	2–1	Ascoli	Verona
	Verza 41'; De Agostini 83'	Report	Iachini 87'	Stadium: Marcantonio Bentegodi; Referee: Baldas

30 November 1986 11	Napoli	0–0	Hellas Verona	Naples
		Report		Stadium: San Paolo; Referee: Magni

14 December 1986 12	Hellas Verona	1–0	Como	Verona
	Rossi 33' (pen.)	Report		Stadium: Marcantonio Bentegodi; Referee: Lo Bello (Siracusa)

21 December 1986 13	Brescia	1–1	Hellas Verona	Brescia
	Branco 70'	Report	Elkjaer 41'	Stadium: Mario Rigamonti; Referee: Redini

4 January 1987 14	Juventus	2–1	Hellas Verona	Turin
	Manfredonia 67'; Cabrini 88'	Report	Elkjaer 28'	Stadium: Comunale; Referee: Longhi

11 January 1987 15	Hellas Verona	2–1	Inter Milan	Verona
	Elkjaer 40' 88'	Report	Altobelli 32'	Stadium: Marcantonio Bentegodi; Referee: Lanese

18 January 1987 16	Hellas Verona	2–1	Torino	Verona
	Elkjaer 53'; Rossi 87'	Report	Pileggi 76'	Stadium: Marcantonio Bentegodi; Referee: Bergamo (Livorno)

1 February 1987 17	AC Milan	1–0	Hellas Verona	Milan
	Virdis 75'	Report		Stadium: Giuseppe Meazza; Referee: Mattei

8 February 1987 18	Hellas Verona	0–1	Roma	Verona
		Report	Nela 15'	Stadium: Marcantonio Bentegodi; Referee: Casarin

22 February 1987 19	Sampdoria	0–0	Hellas Verona	Genova
		Report		Stadium: Luigi Ferraris; Referee: Baldas

1 March 1987 20	Hellas Verona	3–1	Udinese	Verona
	Di Gennaro 3'; Fontolan 74'; Rossi 79' (pen.)	Report	Edinho 21' (pen.)	Stadium: Marcantonio Bentegodi; Referee: Baldi

8 March 1987 21	Avellino	1–1	Hellas Verona	Avellino
	Benedetti 66'	Report	Pacione 64'	Stadium: Partenio; Referee: Paparesta

15 March 1987 22	Hellas Verona	2–2	Fiorentina	Verona
	Elkjaer 28'; Galia 47'	Report	Diaz 73'; Antognoni 80'	Stadium: Marcantonio Bentegodi; Referee: Pezzella (Frattamaggiore)

22 March 1987 23	Atalanta	1–0	Hellas Verona	Bergamo
	Magrin 67' (pen.)	Report		Stadium: Stadio Atleti Azzurri d'Italia; Referee: Pieri (Genova)

29 March 1987 24	Hellas Verona	1–0	Empoli	Verona
	De Agostini 51'	Report		Stadium: Marcantonio Bentegodi; Referee: Boschi (Parma)

5 April 1987 25	Ascoli	0–1	Hellas Verona	Ascoli Piceno
		Report	Fontolan 72'	Stadium: Stadio Cino e Lillo Del Duca; Referee: Redini (Pisa)

12 April 1987 26	Hellas Verona	3–0	Napoli	Verona
	Pacione 21'; Renica 32' (o.g.); Elkjaer 39' (pen.)	Report		Stadium: Marcantonio Bentegodi; Referee: Longhi (Rome)

26 April 1987 27	Como	1–1	Hellas Verona	Como
	Albiero 31' (pen.)	Report	Bruno 7' (o.g.)	Stadium: Stadio Giuseppe Sinigaglia; Referee: Fabricatore (Rome)

3 May 1987 28	Hellas Verona	4–1	Brescia	Verona
	Verza 6' 64'; De Agostini 55'; Di Gennaro 79'	Report	Sacchetti 80'	Stadium: Marcantonio Bentegodi; Referee: Redini (Pisa)

10 May 1987 29	Hellas Verona	1–1	Juventus	Verona
	Elkjaer 68' (pen.)	Report	Manfredonia 74'	Stadium: Marcantonio Bentegodi; Referee: Mattei (Macerata)

17 May 1987 30	Inter Milan	0–0	Hellas Verona	Milan
		Report		Stadium: Giuseppe Meazza; Referee: Paparesta

==== Topscorers ====
- (Denmark) Preben Elkjær 8
- (Italy) Roberto Galia 5
- (Italy) Vinicio Verza 5
- (Italy) Paolo Rossi 4

=== Coppa Italia ===
Pos	Team	Pld	W	D	L	GF	GA	GD	Pts
1	Hellas Verona	5	4	1	0	8	2	+6	9
2	Roma	5	3	1	1	8	3	+5	7
3	Piacenza	5	1	3	1	6	7	−1	5
4	Bari	5	1	2	2	3	4	−1	4
5	Campobasso	5	0	3	2	0	5	−5	3
6	Perugia	5	0	2	3	2	6	−4	2

1	Hellas Verona	1–0	Perugia	Verona
				Stadium: Marcantonio Bentegodi

2	Campobasso	0–2	Hellas Verona

3	Bari	1–3	Hellas Verona	Bari
				Stadium: della Vittoria

4	Hellas Verona	1–1	Piacenza

5	Hellas Verona	1–0	Roma	Verona
				Stadium: Marcantonio Bentegodi

Eightfinals

Hellas Verona	0–0	Cremonese	Verona
			Stadium: Marcantonio Bentegodi

Cremonese	0–0 (4–3 p)	Hellas Verona	Cremona
