= 1984–85 Hellas Verona season =

Hellas Verona F.C.
1984–85 season
- Chairman: Celestino Guidotti
- Manager: Osvaldo Bagnoli
- Serie A: 1st
- Coppa Italia: Quarter-finals
- Top goalscorer: League: Galderisi (11); All: Elkjær, Galderisi (11)
- Highest home attendance: 45,860 vs. Avellino (19 May 1985)
- Lowest home attendance: 32,703 vs. Atalanta (6 January 1985)
- Average home league attendance: 40,111
Home colours	Away colours

In the 1984–85 season, manager Osvaldo Bagnoli guided Hellas Verona F.C. to its only Serie A championship, shocking the Italian football public.

== Season ==
Hellas Verona added to its lineup Briegel (fullback), Preben Elkjær (centre forward), Fanna (winger), Di Gennaro (midfielder) and Galderisi (striker). Bagnoli's side had a good first half of league, losing only a game: it was on Avellino's pitch, where - in the last few minutes - Hellas gave up a 2–1 knockout.

In retour matches, the team achieved its best results in key games. This path - unexpected by most part of its supporters - came to climax on 12 May 1985, the Sunday on which, by drawing at Atalanta's home, Verona clinched its first domestic title.

== Squad ==
=== Goalkeepers ===
- (Italy) Claudio Garella
- (Italy) Sergio Spuri

=== Defenders ===
- (Germany) Hans-Peter Briegel
- (Italy) Mauro Ferroni
- (Italy) Silvano Fontolan
- (Italy) Fabio Marangon
- (Italy) Luciano Marangon
- (Italy) Roberto Tricella

=== Midfielders ===
- (Italy) Luciano Bruni
- (Italy) Antonio Di Gennaro
- (Italy) Dario Donà
- (Italy) Pietro Fanna
- (Italy) Luigi Sacchetti
- (Italy) Domenico Volpati

=== Attackers ===
- (Denmark) Preben Elkjær
- (Italy) Giuseppe Galderisi
- (Italy) Franco Turchetta

=== Transfers ===
In
P.	Name	from
D	Hans-Peter Briegel	FC Kaiserslautern
D	Fabio Marangon (II)	Alessandria
C	Dario Donà	Bologna F.C.
A	Preben Elkjær	Lokeren
A	Franco Turchetta	Varese

Out
P.	Name	to
D	Władysław Żmuda	Cremonese
D	Mario Guidetti	Ancona Calcio
D	Massimo Storgato	S.S. Lazio
C	Francesco Guidolin	Venezia
A	Joe Jordan	Southampton F.C.
A	Maurizio Iorio	A.S. Roma

== Competitions ==
=== Serie A ===
==== League table ====
Pos	Team	Pld	W	D	L	GF	GA	GD	Pts	Qualification or relegation
1	Hellas Verona (C)	30	15	13	2	42	19	+23	43	Qualification to European Cup
2	Torino	30	14	11	5	36	22	+14	39	Qualification to UEFA Cup
3	Internazionale	30	13	12	5	42	28	+14	38	Qualification to UEFA Cup
4	Sampdoria	30	12	13	5	36	21	+15	37	Qualification to Cup Winners' Cup
5	Milan	30	12	12	6	31	25	+6	36 (Note: Position defined by head-to-head points: Milan: 3 pts; Juventus: 1 pt.)	Qualification to UEFA Cup

Source: RSSSF.com
Rules for classification: 1) Points; 2) Head-to-head points; 3) Head-to-head goal difference; 4) Goal difference; 5) Goals scored; 6) Draw. (Note: Head-to-head record is used only after all the matches between the teams in question have been played).
(C) Champions

==== Results by round ====
Round	1	2	3	4	5	6	7	8	9	10	11	12	13	14	15	16	17	18	19	20	21	22	23	24	25	26	27	28	29	30
Ground	H	A	H	A	H	A	H	A	H	A	H	A	A	H	A	A	H	A	H	A	H	A	H	A	H	A	H	H	A	H
Result	W	W	W	D	W	D	W	W	D	W	D	W	D	D	L	D	W	W	D	D	W	W	W	D	L	D	W	D	D	W
Position	1	1	1	1	1	1	1	1	1	1	1	1	1	1	1	1	1	1	1	1	1	1	1	1	1	1	1	1	1	1

Source: http://calcio-seriea.net/allenatori_squadra/1984/903/
A = Away; H = Home; W = Win; D = Draw; L = Loss; = 1985–86 European Cup; = 1985–86 UEFA Cup Following UEFA ranking changes and the English ban, Italy gained a third berth.

==== Matches ====
16 September 1984 1	Hellas Verona	3–1	Napoli	Verona
	Briegel 26'; Galderisi 33'; Di Gennaro 75'	Report	Daniel Bertoni 58'	Stadium: Marcantonio Bentegodi; Referee: Maurizio Mattei

23 September 1984 2	Ascoli	1–3	Hellas Verona	Ascoli Piceno
	Hernandez 75'		Di Gennaro 50'; Briegel 60'; Elkjær 70'	Stadium: Cino e Lillo Del Duca; Referee: Pierluigi Magni

30 September 1984 3	Hellas Verona	1–0	Udinese	Verona
	Giuseppe Galderisi (59 pen)	Report		Stadium: Marcantonio Bentegodi; Referee: Luigi Agnolin

7 October 1984 4	Inter	0–0	Hellas Verona	Milan
		Report		Stadium: Giuseppe Meazza; Referee: Carlo Longhi (Rome)

14 October 1984 5	Hellas Verona	2–0	Juventus	Verona
	Galderisi 62'; Elkjær 81'	Report		Stadium: Marcantonio Bentegodi; Referee: Paolo Bergamo (Livorno)

21 October 1984 6	Roma	0–0	Hellas Verona	Rome
		Report		Stadium: Olimpico; Referee: Maurizio Mattei (Macerata)

28 October 1984 7	Hellas Verona	2–1	Fiorentina	Verona
	Moz 25'og Galderisi 40'	Report	Pecci 58'	Stadium: Marcantonio Bentegodi; Referee: Massimo Ciulli (Rome)

11 November 1984 8	Cremonese	0–2	Hellas Verona	Cremona
		Report	Galderisi 74' (pen.); Briegel 84'	Stadium: Giovanni Zini; Referee: Giancarlo Redini(Pisa)

18 November 1984 9	Hellas Verona	0–0	Sampdoria	Verona
		Report		Stadium: Marcantonio Bentegodi; Referee: Pietro D'Elia (Salerno)

25 November 1984 10	Torino	1–2	Hellas Verona	Turin
	Briegel 20'	Report	Dossena 24'; Marangon 60'	Stadium: Comunale; Referee: Pietro D'Elia (Salerno)

2 December 1984 11	Verona	0–0	Milan	Verona
		Report		Stadium: Marcantonio Bentegodi; Referee: Maurizio Mattei (Macerata)

16 December 1984 12	Lazio	0–1	Verona	Rome
		Report	Podavini 60' (o.g.)	Stadium: Olimpico; Referee: Claudio Pieri (Genoa)

23 December 1984 13	Como	0–0	Verona	Como
		Report		Stadium: Giuseppe Sinigaglia; Referee: Egidio Ballerini (La Spezia)

6 January 1985 14	Verona	1–1	Atalanta	Verona
	Luciano Bruni (35)	Report	Marco Pacione (85)	Stadium: Marcantonio Bentegodi; Referee: Romeo Paparesta (Bari)

13 January 1985 15	Avellino	2–1	Verona	Avellino
	Domenico Volpati (32 og)Angelo Colombo (84)	Report	Luciano Marangon (38)	Stadium: Partenio; Referee: Giancarlo Redini (Pisa)

20 January 1985 16	Napoli	0–0	Verona	Naples
		Report		Stadium: San Paolo; Referee: Pierluigi Pairetto (Turin)

27 January 1985 17	Verona	2–0	Ascoli	Verona
	Galderisi 28'; Sacchetti 33'	Report		Stadium: Marcantonio Bentegodi; Referee: Pietro D'Elia (Salerno)

10 February 1985 18	Udinese	3–5	Hellas Verona	Udine
	Edinho 45'; Carnevale 53'; Mauro 59'	Report	Briegel 3'; Galderisi 20'; Preben Elkjær 45'; Preben Elkjær 61'; Briegel 63'	Stadium: Friuli; Referee: Paolo Casarin (Milan)

17 February 1985 19	Hellas Verona	1–1	Inter	Verona
	Briegel 48'	Report	Altobelli 39'	Stadium: Marcantonio Bentegodi

24 February 1985 20	Juventus	1–1	Hellas Verona	Turin
	Briaschi 74'	Report	Di Gennaro 76'	Stadium: Comunale

3 March 1985 21	Verona	1–0	Roma	Verona
	Elkjær 66'	Report		Stadium: Marcantonio Bentegodi

17 March 1985 22	Fiorentina	1–3	Hellas Verona	Florence
	Monelli 11'	Report	Fontolan 57'; Galderisi 70' (pen.); Galderisi 83'	Stadium: Comunale

24 March 1985 23	Hellas Verona	3–0	Cremonese	Verona
	Di Gennaro 39'; Elkjær 61'; Briegel 90'	Report		Stadium: Marcantonio Bentegodi

31 March 1985 24	Sampdoria	1–1	Verona	Genoa
	Renica 11'	Report	Galderisi 5'	Stadium: Luigi Ferraris; Referee: Paolo Casarin (Milan)

14 April 1985 25	Verona	1–2	Torino	Verona
	Briegel 77'	Report	Serena 53'; Schachner 65'	Stadium: Marcantonio Bentegodi; Referee: Salvatore Lombardo (Marsala)

21 April 1985 26	Milan	0–0	Verona	Milan
		Report		Stadium: San Siro; Referee: Carlo Longhi (Rome)

28 April 1985 27	Verona	1–0	Lazio	Verona
	Fanna 78'	Report		Stadium: Marcantonio Bentegodi

5 May 1985 28	Verona	0–0	Como	Verona
		Report		Stadium: Marcantonio Bentegodi

12 May 1985 29	Atalanta	1–1	Hellas Verona	Bergamo
	Perico 43'	Report	Preben Elkjær 51'	Stadium: Atleti Azzurri d'Italia

19 May 1985 30	Verona	4–2	Avellino	Verona
	Fanna 8'; Garuti 40' (o.g.); Galderisi 61' (pen.); Preben Elkjær 90'	Report	Faccini 42'; Diaz 46'	Stadium: Marcantonio Bentegodi; Referee: Gennaro Testa (Prato)

=== Coppa Italia ===
First round

22 August 1984 1	Hellas Verona	4–2	Benevento	Verona
	Elkjær 7', 13', 35'; Di Gennaro 10' (pen.)		36' Lunerti; 74' Orati	Stadium: Marcantonio Bentegodi; Referee: Testa

26 August 1984 2	Campobasso	0–0	Hellas Verona	Campobasso
				Stadium: Stadio Giovanni Romagnoli; Referee: Ballerini

30 August 1984 3	Hellas Verona	5–0	Casarano	Verona
	Briegel 16', 19'; Di Gennaro 42'; Secchi 45' (o.g.); Donà 72'			Stadium: Marcantonio Bentegodi; Referee: Leni

2 September 1984 4	Catania	2–3	Hellas Verona	Siracusa
	Ermini 29'; Luvanor 87'		28' Galderisi; 41' Di Gennaro; 77' Tricella	Stadium: Stadio Nicola De Simone; Referee: Bianciardi

4 September 1984 5	Verona	1–0	Ascoli	Verona
	Bruni 34'			Stadium: Stadio Marcantonio Bentegodi; Referee: Ciulli

Eightfinals

13 February 1985	Genoa	0–1	Hellas Verona	Genoa
			46' Elkjær	Stadium: Luigi Ferraris; Referee: Bianciardi

27 February 1985	Hellas Verona	2–1	Genoa	Verona
	Di Gennaro 70', 76'		79' Policano	Stadium: Marcantonio Bentegodi; Referee: Pirandola

Quarterfinals

12 June 1985	Verona	3–0	Internazionale	Verona
	Sacchetti 32'; Galderisi 71' (pen.); Bruni 87'			Stadium: Marcantonio Bentegodi; Referee: Agnolin

19 June 1985	Internazionale	5–1 (a.e.t.) (5–4 agg.)	Hellas Verona	Milan
	Rummenigge 18', 25'; Altobelli 50'; Causio 96'; Brady 117'		107' Elkjær	Stadium: Giuseppe Meazza; Referee: Mattei

== Statistics ==
=== Players statistics ===
No.	Pos	Nat	Player	Total		Serie A		Coppa	
No.	Pos	Nat	Player	Apps	Goals	Apps	Goals	Apps	Goals
	GK	(Italy) ITA	Claudio Garella	35	-22	30	-19	5	-3
	DF	(Italy) ITA	Mauro Ferroni	28	0	15+5	0	8	0
	DF	(Italy) ITA	Roberto Tricella	37	1	30	0	7	1
	DF	(Italy) ITA	Silvano Fontolan	33	1	28	1	5	0
	DF	(Italy) ITA	Luciano Marangon	36	2	29	2	7	0
	MF	(West Germany) FRG	Hans-Peter Briegel	36	11	27	9	9	2
	MF	(Italy) ITA	Antonio Di Gennaro	38	9	29	4	9	5
	MF	(Italy) ITA	Domenico Volpati	38	0	29+1	0	8	0
	MF	(Italy) ITA	Pietro Fanna	36	2	29	2	7	0
	FW	(Denmark) DEN	Preben Elkjær Larsen	32	13	22+1	8	9	5
	FW	(Italy) ITA	Giuseppe Galderisi	36	13	29	11	7	2
	GK	(Italy) ITA	Sergio Spuri	6	-7	0+1	0	5	-7
	MF	(Italy) ITA	Luciano Bruni	35	3	15+12	1	8	2
	MF	(Italy) ITA	Luigi Sacchetti	18	2	11+4	1	3	1
	FW	(Italy) ITA	Franco Turchetta	23	0	4+12	0	7	0
	MF	(Italy) ITA	Dario Donà	18	1	2+10	0	6	1
	DF	(Italy) ITA	Fabio Marangon	10	0	1+2	0	7	0
	MF	(Italy) ITA	Antonio Terracciano	1	0	0	0	1	0
	DF	(Italy) ITA	Residori	0	0	0	0		
	MF	(Italy) ITA	Matteoni	0	0	0	0		

- Source: http://calcio-seriea.net/allenatori_squadra/1984/912/

== Sources ==
- RSSSF - Italy 1984/85
- HellaStory.net

== See also ==
- Hellas Verona F.C.
