= 1985–86 Hellas Verona season =

Hellas Verona F.C.
1985–1986 season
- Chairman: Celestino Guidotti
- Manager: Osvaldo Bagnoli
- Serie A: 10th
- European Cup: Last 16
- Coppa Italia: Quarter-finals
- Top goalscorer: League: Preben Elkjær (9); All: Preben Elkjær (14)

== Season ==
In 1985-86, Hellas Verona came into a disappointing season: it failed the attempt to retain his domestic title, coming just at tenth place.

Due to historical win of Scudetto, attained in previous season, Hellas also took part in European Cup. However, the hopes of a respectable result were lost in the second round: Hellas met Juventus, reigning champion. The first leg resulted in a goalless draw: the second, played in Turin, ended in Juventus' win (2-0) who reached quarter-finals.

== Squad ==
=== Goalkeepers ===
- (Italy) Giuliano Giuliani
- (Italy) Sergio Spuri

=== Defenders ===
- (Germany) Hans-Peter Briegel
- (Italy) Mauro Ferroni
- (Italy) Silvano Fontolan
- (Italy) Gianluigi Galbagini
- (Italy) Federico Giolo
- (Italy) Fabio Marangon
- (Italy) Roberto Tricella

=== Midfielders ===
- (Italy) Luciano Bruni
- (Italy) Antonio Di Gennaro
- (Italy) Mauro Roberto
- (Italy) Luigi Sacchetti
- (Italy) Antonio Terraciano
- (Italy) Vinicio Verza
- (Italy) Beniamino Vignola
- (Italy) Domenico Volpati

=== Attackers ===
- (Italy) Giuseppe Galderisi
- (Denmark) Preben Elkjær
- (Italy) Franco Turchetta
- (Italy) Rudy Baratto

== Competitions ==
=== Serie A ===
==== League table ====
Pos	Team	Pld	W	D	L	GF	GA	GD	Pts
8	Atalanta	30	7	15	8	27	26	+1	29
9	Como	30	7	15	8	32	32	0	29
10	Hellas Verona	30	9	10	11	31	40	−9	28
11	Avellino	30	9	9	12	28	38	−10	27
12	Sampdoria	30	8	11	11	27	25	+2	27

Source: RSSSF.com
Rules for classification: 1) Points; 2) Head-to-head points; 3) Head-to-head goal difference; 4) Goal difference; 5) Goals scored; 6) Draw. (Note: Head-to-head record is used only after all the matches between the teams in question have been played).

==== Matches ====
8 September 1985 1	Verona	2–2	Lecce	Verona
	Elkjær 25'; Di Gennaro 63'	Report	54' Nobile; 72' Paciocco	Stadium: Stadio Marcantonio Bentegodi; Referee: Lo Bello

15 September 1985 2	Avellino	3–1	Verona	Avellino
	Benedetti 57'; Díaz 71'; Agostinelli 89'	Report	4' Vignola	Stadium: Stadio Partenio; Referee: Longhi

22 September 1985 3	Verona	3–0	Como	Verona
	Verza 60', 79'; Elkjær 43'	Report		Stadium: Marcantonio Bentegodi; Referee: Coppetelli

29 September 1985 4	Hellas Verona	0–1	Juventus	Verona
		Report	18' Laudrup I	Stadium: Marcantonio Bentegodi; Referee: Lanese

6 October 1985 5	Inter	0–0	Hellas Verona	Milan
		Report		Stadium: Giuseppe Meazza; Referee: Redini

13 October 1985 6	Hellas Verona	2–1	Sampdoria	Verona
	Bruni 14'; Turchetta 36' (pen.)	Report	54' Salsano	Stadium: Marcantonio Bentegodi; Referee: Paparesta

20 October 1985 7	Napoli	5–0	Hellas Verona	Naples
	Giordano 21'; Bagni 48'; Maradona 58'; Bertoni 83'; Pecci 85'	Report		Stadium: San Paolo; Referee: Lo Bello

27 October 1985 8	Hellas Verona	1–0	Milan	Verona
	Elkjær 3'	Report		Stadium: Marcantonio Bentegodi; Referee: Lanese

3 November 1985 9	Roma	2–1	Hellas Verona	Rome
	Ferroni I 42' (o.g.); Nela 52'	Report	31' Elkjær	Stadium: Olimpico; Referee: Magni

10 November 1985 10	Hellas Verona	2–2	Fiorentina	Verona
	Elkjær 2'; Briegel 56'	Report	12' Berti; 83' (pen.) Passarella	Stadium: Marcantonio Bentegodi; Referee: Casarin

24 November 1985 11	Atalanta	0–0	Verona	Bergamo
		Report		Stadium: Comunale; Referee: Leni

1 December 1985 12	Udinese	5–1	Hellas Verona	Udine
	Fontolan I 41' (o.g.); Pasa 49'; Carnevale I 65'; Barbadillo 74'; Miano 86'	Report	16' Volpati	Stadium: Friuli; Referee: Longhi

8 December 1985 13	Hellas Verona	2–0	Bari	Verona
	Elkjær 40', 82'	Report		Stadium: Marcantonio Bentegodi; Referee: Magni

15 December 1985 14	Pisa	0–1	Hellas Verona	Pisa
		Report	9' Briegel	Stadium: Arena Garibaldi; Referee: Baldi

22 December 1985 15	Hellas Verona	1–0	Torino	Verona
	Galderisi 37'	Report		Stadium: Marcantonio Bentegodi; Referee: D'Elia

5 January 1986 16	Lecce	1–0	Hellas Verona	Lecce
	Pasculli 28'	Report		Stadium: Via del Mare; Referee: Mattei

12 January 1986 17	Hellas Verona	2–0	Avellino	Verona
	Galderisi 54', 68'	Report		Stadium: Marcantonio Bentegodi; Referee: Casarin

19 January 1986 18	Como	1–0	Hellas Verona	Como
	Corneliusson 43'	Report		Stadium: Giuseppe Sinigaglia; Referee: Pairetto

26 January 1986 19	Juventus	3–0	Hellas Verona	Turin
	Platini 49'; Serena 69'; Laudrup I 71'	Report		Stadium: Comunale; Referee: Pieri

9 February 1986 20	Hellas Verona	0–0	Inter	Verona
		Report		Stadium: Marcantonio Bentegodi; Referee: Paparesta

16 February 1986 21	Sampdoria	0–0	Hellas Verona	Genoa
		Report		Stadium: Luigi Ferraris; Referee: Boschi

23 February 1986 22	Hellas Verona	2–2	Napoli	Verona
	Sacchetti 28'; Galderisi 53' (pen.)	Report	55' (pen.), 80' Maradona	Stadium: Marcantonio Bentegodi; Referee: Bianciardi

2 March 1986 23	Milan	1–1	Hellas Verona	Milan
	Fontolan I 70' (o.g.)	Report	83' (pen.) Galderisi	Stadium: San Siro; Referee: Pezzella

9 March 1986 24	Hellas Verona	3–2	Roma	Verona
	Di Gennaro 24'; Galderisi 51' (pen.); Briegel 89'	Report	21', 29' Pruzzo	Stadium: Marcantonio Bentegodi; Referee: D'Elia

16 March 1986 25	Fiorentina	0–0	Hellas Verona	Florence
		Report		Stadium: Comunale; Referee: Boschi

23 March 1986 26	Hellas Verona	0–3	Atalanta	Verona
		Report	12' Cantarutti; Cantarutti 54'; Cantarutti 80'	Stadium: Marcantonio Bentegodi; Referee: Mattei

6 April 1986 27	Hellas Verona	1–1	Udinese	Verona
	Elkjær 4'	Report	36' Colombo	Stadium: Marcantonio Bentegodi; Referee: Lo Bello

13 April 1986 28	Bari	3–1	Hellas Verona	Bari
	Di Gennaro 21' (o.g.); De Trizio 49'; Sclosa 63'	Report	77' Verza	Stadium: Stadio della Vittoria; Referee: Baldas

20 April 1986 29	Hellas Verona	3–0	Pisa	Verona
	Turchetta 24'; Di Gennaro 55'; Elkjær 86'	Report		Stadium: Marcantonio Bentegodi; Referee: Longhi

27 April 1986 30	Torino	2–1	Hellas Verona	Turin
	Francini 36', 61'	Report	25' Vignola	Stadium: Comunale; Referee: Fabricatore

==== Topscorers ====
- (Denmark) Preben Elkjær 9
- (Italy) Giuseppe Galderisi 6
- (Italy) Vinicio Verza 3

=== European Cup ===
First round

18 September 1985	Hellas Verona	3–1	(Greece) PAOK Salonica	Verona
	Elkjær 14', 85'; Volpati 87'	Report	70' Skartados	Stadium: Stadio Marcantonio Bentegodi; Attendance: 27 008; Referee: (Austria) Brunmeier

2 October 1985	(Greece) PAOK Salonica	1–2	Hellas Verona	Salonica
	Vasilakos 3'	Report	29', 72' Elkjær	Stadium: Stadio Toumba; Referee: (Spain) Lama Castillo

Eightfinals

23 October 1985	Hellas Verona	0–0	Juventus	Verona
		Report		Stadium: Stadio Marcantonio Bentegodi; Attendance: 38.866; Referee: (Scotland) Valentine

6 November 1985	Juventus	2–0	Hellas Verona	Turin
	Platini 19' (pen.); Serena 50'	Report		Stadium: Stadio Comunale; Referee: (France) Wurtz

=== Coppa Italia ===
First round

21 August 1985 1	Cremonese	0–2	Hellas Verona	Cremona
			76' Galderisi; 80' Turchetta	Stadium: Giovanni Zini; Referee: Mattei

25 August 1985 2	Verona	2–0	Parma	Verona
	Galderisi 24' (pen.), 65'			Stadium: Stadio Marcantonio Bentegodi; Referee: Pirandola

28 August 1985 3	Bologna F.C.	1–0	Hellas Verona	Bologna
	Marocchi 49'			Stadium: Renato Dall'Ara; Referee: Casarin

1 September 1985 4	Piacenza	1–1	Hellas Verona	Piacenza
	Simonetta 57'		1' Elkjær	Stadium: Stadio Galleana; Referee: Da Pozzo

4 September 1985 5	Hellas Verona	1–1	Pisa	Verona
	Di Gennaro 50'		76' Baldieri	Stadium: Stadio Marcantonio Bentegodi; Referee: Longhi

Eightfinals

29 January 1986	Hellas Verona	3–0	Pisa	Verona
	Galderisi 12', 75'; Sacchetti 16'			Stadium: Stadio Marcantonio Bentegodi; Referee: Boschi

12 February 1986	Pisa	2–0	Hellas Verona	Pisa
	Volpecina 19'; Baldieri 54'			Stadium: Stadio Arena Garibaldi; Referee: Frigerio

Quarterfinals

7 May 1986	Hellas Verona	2–1	Como	Verona
	Vignola 57', 65'		90' Notaristefano	Stadium: Marcantonio Bentegodi

21 May 1986	Como	3–1 (3–4 agg.)	Hellas Verona	Como
	Casagrande 13'; Borgonovo 41', 51'		18' Verza	Stadium: Giuseppe Sinigaglia; Referee: Mattei

== Sources ==
- RSSSF - Italy 1985/86
