= Pietro Fanna =

Italian footballer (born 1958)

Pierino Fanna
Personal information
- Date of birth: 23 June 1958 (age 68)
- Place of birth: Grimacco, Italy
- Height: 1.78 m (5 ft 10 in)
- Position: Attacking midfielder

Senior career*
Years	Team	Apps	(Gls)
1975–1977	Atalanta	55	(6)
1977–1982	Juventus	101	(13)
1982–1985	Verona	85	(14)
1985–1989	Inter Milan	97	(4)
1989–1993	Verona	103	(6)

International career
1976–1980	Italy U21	13	(3)
1979–1984	Italy Olympic	6	(3)
1983–1985	Italy	14	(0)

Managerial career
- 1998–2000: Verona (assistant)
- 2000–2002: Venezia (assistant)
- * Club domestic league appearances and goals

Pierino Fanna (Italian pronunciation: [ˈpjeˈriːno ˈfanna]; born 23 June 1958) is an Italian professional football coach and a former player, who played in midfield, either as an attacking midfielder or as a winger.

== Club career ==
Born in Grimacco, Province of Udine, Fanna spent his youth career with Udinese. He moved to Atalanta (1975–77) at the age of 17, making 20 appearances and scoring a goal in his debut season in Serie B. During the 1976–77 season, the young winger played an important role in achieving Serie A promotion for the Bergamo side.

In 1977, he moved to Serie A giants Juventus (1977–1982), making his Serie A debut with the Turin club. Despite achieving notable domestic success, he failed to live up to his potential during his time at the club, and he was often played out of position. During his last few seasons with Juventus, he managed to earn a place in the starting line-up, and he was still able to contribute to his team's three Serie A titles, which he won during the 1977–78, 1980–81, and 1981–82 seasons, also winning a Coppa Italia with the club during the 1978–79 season.

In 1982, he transferred to Hellas Verona F.C. (1982–85), where he helped the team to win an historic Serie A title during the 1984–85 season under manager Osvaldo Bagnoli, playing alongside other key players such as Roberto Tricella and Antonio Di Gennaro. In 1985, Fanna moved to Inter (1985–89). Under manager Giovanni Trapattoni, he contributed to the victory of Inter's record-breaking 1988–89 Serie A title, although he only made 13 appearances.

During the 1989–90 season, he returned to Verona (1989–93) under Bagnoli, as he was unable to prevent the club's relegation to Serie B that year. The following season, he helped his club to return to Serie A, however, during the 1991–92 season, the club was relegated once again. He retired in 1993, after a mid-table finish in Serie B with Verona that season.

Throughout his career, he won five Serie A titles and a Coppa Italia. Fanna is one of six footballers to win Serie A with three clubs, a feat he managed with Juventus, Verona, and Inter; the other five players to have managed the same feat are Giovanni Ferrari, Filippo Cavalli, Sergio Gori, Aldo Serena and Attilio Lombardo.

== International career ==
Fanna represented Italy at Under-21 level on 13 occasions between 1976 and 1980, scoring 3 goals; he also took part in the 1978 and 1980 UEFA European Under-21 Championships with the Under-21 side. He made his debut in 1977. He also represented the Italian Under-23 Olympic side on 6 occasions between 1979 and 1984, scoring 3 goals. He also took part with Italy at the 1984 Summer Olympics, where the team finished in fourth place after reaching the semi-finals, losing 2–1 to Yugoslavia; during the tournament, he scored the only goal of the match in a victory over hosts United States in the group stage, and also another in the 2–1 semi-final defeat to Brazil. He also represented the Italian senior side on 14 occasions between 1983 and 1985.

== Style of play ==
Fanna was a tactically versatile midfielder, who was primarily deployed as a right winger, although he was capable of playing on either flank, or also in the centre as an attacking midfielder; he was also played out of position as a second striker on occasion, which was not his preferred role, however. He was a quick and creative player with good technique and dribbling skills, who was known for his ability to get past opponents in one on one situations on the flank due to his speed on the ball and his use of feints. Although he possessed an accurate shot and was capable of scoring goals, he was known in particular for being an excellent assist provider and crosser of the ball. Regarded as one of Italy's most promising prospects in his youth, despite his talent, he never truly lived up to his potential, and he mainly excelled in smaller teams, where the play would be centred around him. Due to his problematic and introversive character, he was somewhat inconsistent during his stints with larger clubs, where he often drifted in and out of games, as he struggled to handle the pressure placed on him; as a result, he frequently suffered from a lack of confidence with bigger teams, and was more prone to errors. During his time at Verona, however, he played an important role in the team's success by utilising his skills and intelligent movement to hold up the ball in order to create space for teammates and full-backs making overlapping attacking runs. Furthermore, his pace, positional sense, and ability to make attacking runs allowed him to excel in their newly developed counter-attacking style of play.

== Honours ==
Juventus

- Serie A: 1977–78, 1980–81, 1981–82
- Coppa Italia: 1978–79

Hellas Verona

- Serie A: 1984–85

Inter Milan

- Serie A: 1988–89
