= Coppa Campioni d'Italia =

Italian association football trophy

The Coppa Campioni d'Italia is the trophy that in Italian football represents the victory of the Serie A championship.

The trophy was created in 1960 by sculptor and medalist Ettore Calvelli; has a height of 45 cm around and weighs about 5 kg, rests on a stone base hard blue sodalite and has at its center a ring of gold depicting an allegory of athletes; between 2015 and 2016, these dimensions increased (specifically, about 20 cm in height) for television requirements. The Cup has bears engraved on golden base, the names of all the teams that have won the top division since the season 1960–61.

The first team to be awarded the Coppa Campioni d'Italia was Juventus in 1961, the same club as in 2005 received the trophy for the first time on the field (which they were later stripped of).

The original trophy remains property of the Lega Serie A and is only held in custody by the winning club; when returned the club receives a reduced scale model to be exhibited in their trophy room.

== List of winners ==
Season	Winners	Manager	Captain
1960–61	Juventus	(Italy) (Argentina) Renato Cesarini	(Italy) (Argentina) Omar Sívori
1961–62	Milan	(Italy) Nereo Rocco	(Italy) Cesare Maldini
1962–63	Internazionale	(Argentina) Helenio Herrera	(Italy) Giacinto Facchetti
1963–64	Bologna	(Italy) Fulvio Bernardini	(Italy) Giacomo Bulgarelli
1964–65	Internazionale	(Argentina) Helenio Herrera	(Italy) Armando Picchi
1965–66	Internazionale	(Argentina) Helenio Herrera	(Italy) Armando Picchi
1966–67	Juventus	(Paraguay) Heriberto Herrera	(Italy) Ernesto Castano
1967–68	Milan	(Italy) Nereo Rocco	(Italy) Gianni Rivera
1968–69	Fiorentina	(Italy) Bruno Pesaola	(Italy) Giancarlo De Sisti
1969–70	Cagliari	(Italy) Manlio Scopigno	(Italy) Pierluigi Cera
1970–71	Internazionale	(Italy) Giovanni Invernizzi	(Italy) Giacinto Facchetti
1971–72	Juventus	(Czechoslovakia) Čestmír Vycpálek	(Italy) Sandro Salvadore
1972–73	Juventus	(Czechoslovakia) Čestmír Vycpálek	(Italy) Sandro Salvadore
1973–74	Lazio	(Italy) Tommaso Maestrelli	(Italy) (England) Giuseppe Wilson
1974–75	Juventus	(Italy) Carlo Parola	(Italy) Giuseppe Furino
1975–76	Torino	(Italy) Luigi Radice	(Italy) Claudio Sala
1976–77	Juventus	(Italy) Giovanni Trapattoni	(Italy) Giuseppe Furino
1977–78	Juventus	(Italy) Giovanni Trapattoni	(Italy) Giuseppe Furino
1978–79	Milan	(Sweden) Nils Liedholm	(Italy) Gianni Rivera
1979–80	Internazionale	(Italy) Eugenio Bersellini	(Italy) Graziano Bini
1980–81	Juventus	(Italy) Giovanni Trapattoni	(Italy) Giuseppe Furino
1981–82	Juventus	(Italy) Giovanni Trapattoni	(Italy) Giuseppe Furino
1982–83	Roma	(Sweden) Nils Liedholm	(Italy) Agostino Di Bartolomei
1983–84	Juventus	(Italy) Giovanni Trapattoni	(Italy) Gaetano Scirea
1984–85	Hellas Verona	(Italy) Osvaldo Bagnoli	(Italy) Roberto Tricella
1985–86	Juventus	(Italy) Giovanni Trapattoni	(Italy) Gaetano Scirea
1986–87	Napoli	(Italy) Ottavio Bianchi	(Argentina) Diego Maradona
1987–88	Milan	(Italy) Arrigo Sacchi	(Italy) Franco Baresi
1988–89	Internazionale	(Italy) Giovanni Trapattoni	(Italy) Giuseppe Baresi
1989–90	Napoli	(Italy) Alberto Bigon	(Argentina) Diego Maradona
1990–91	Sampdoria	(Socialist Federal Republic of Yugoslavia) Vujadin Boškov	(Italy) Luca Pellegrini
1991–92	Milan	(Italy) Fabio Capello	(Italy) Franco Baresi
1992–93	Milan	(Italy) Fabio Capello	(Italy) Franco Baresi
1993–94	Milan	(Italy) Fabio Capello	(Italy) Franco Baresi
1994–95	Juventus	(Italy) Marcello Lippi	(Italy) Roberto Baggio
1995–96	Milan	(Italy) Fabio Capello	(Italy) Franco Baresi
1996–97	Juventus	(Italy) Marcello Lippi	(Italy) Antonio Conte
1997–98	Juventus	(Italy) Marcello Lippi	(Italy) Antonio Conte
1998–99	Milan	(Italy) Alberto Zaccheroni	(Italy) Paolo Maldini
1999–2000	Lazio	(Sweden) Sven-Göran Eriksson	(Italy) Alessandro Nesta
2000–01	Roma	(Italy) Fabio Capello	(Italy) Francesco Totti
2001–02	Juventus	(Italy) Marcello Lippi	(Italy) Alessandro Del Piero
2002–03	Juventus	(Italy) Marcello Lippi	(Italy) Alessandro Del Piero
2003–04	Milan	(Italy) Carlo Ancelotti	(Italy) Paolo Maldini
2004–05	None: title stripped from Juventus		
2005–06	Internazionale	(Italy) Roberto Mancini	(Argentina) Javier Zanetti
2006–07	Internazionale	(Italy) Roberto Mancini	(Argentina) Javier Zanetti
2007–08	Internazionale	(Italy) Roberto Mancini	(Argentina) Javier Zanetti
2008–09	Internazionale	(Portugal) José Mourinho	(Argentina) Javier Zanetti
2009–10	Internazionale	(Portugal) José Mourinho	(Argentina) Javier Zanetti
2010–11	Milan	(Italy) Massimiliano Allegri	(Italy) Massimo Ambrosini
2011–12	Juventus	(Italy) Antonio Conte	(Italy) Alessandro Del Piero
2012–13	Juventus	(Italy) Antonio Conte	(Italy) Gianluigi Buffon
2013–14	Juventus	(Italy) Antonio Conte	(Italy) Gianluigi Buffon
2014–15	Juventus	(Italy) Massimiliano Allegri	(Italy) Gianluigi Buffon
2015–16	Juventus	(Italy) Massimiliano Allegri	(Italy) Gianluigi Buffon
2016–17	Juventus	(Italy) Massimiliano Allegri	(Italy) Gianluigi Buffon
2017–18	Juventus	(Italy) Massimiliano Allegri	(Italy) Gianluigi Buffon
2018–19	Juventus	(Italy) Massimiliano Allegri	(Italy) Giorgio Chiellini
2019–20	Juventus	(Italy) Maurizio Sarri	(Italy) Giorgio Chiellini
2020–21	Internazionale	(Italy) Antonio Conte	(Slovenia) Samir Handanović
2021–22	Milan	(Italy) Stefano Pioli	(Italy) Alessio Romagnoli
2022–23	Napoli	(Italy) Luciano Spalletti	(Italy) Giovanni Di Lorenzo
2023–24	Internazionale	(Italy) Simone Inzaghi	(Argentina) Lautaro Martínez
2024–25	Napoli	(Italy) Antonio Conte	(Italy) Giovanni Di Lorenzo
2025–26	Internazionale	(Romania) Christian Chivu	(Argentina) Lautaro Martínez

== Number of cups by club ==
Club	Cup wins	Seasons won
**Juventus**	25	1960–61, 1966–67, 1971–72, 1972–73, 1974–75, 1976–77, 1977–78, 1980–81, 1981–82, 1983–84, 1985–86, 1994–95, 1996–97, 1997–98, 2001–02, 2002–03, 2011–12, 2012–13, 2013–14, 2014–15, 2015–16, 2016–17, 2017–18, 2018–19, 2019–20
**Internazionale**	13	1962–63, 1964–65, 1965–66, 1970–71, 1979–80, 1988–89, 2005–06, 2006–07, 2007–08, 2008–09, 2009–10, 2020–21, 2023–24
**Milan**	12	1961–62, 1967–68, 1978–79, 1987–88, 1991–92, 1992–93, 1993–94, 1995–96, 1998–99, 2003–04, 2010–11, 2021–22
**Napoli**	4	1986–87, 1989–90, 2022–23, 2024–25
**Roma**	2	1982–83, 2000–01
**Lazio**	2	1973–74, 1999–2000
**Torino**	1	1975–76
**Bologna**	1	1963–64
**Fiorentina**	1	1968–69
**Cagliari**	1	1969–70
**Hellas Verona**	1	1984–85
Sampdoria	1	1990–91

Bold indicates clubs currently playing in the top division.

== See also ==
- Scudetto
