= Marangon =

Marangon is an Italian surname. Notable people with the surname include:

- Doniéber Alexander Marangon (born 1979), Brazilian football goalkeeper
- Edu Marangon (born 1963), retired Brazilian football player and manager
- Fabio Marangon (born 1962), retired Italian football player; brother of Luciano Marangon
- João Paulo Fernando Marangon (born 1989), Brazilian footballer
- Lisa Marangon (born 1980), Australian professional triathlete
- Luciano Marangon (born 1956), retired Italian football player
- Renzo Marangon (born 1955), Italian politician
