= Fontolan =

Fontolan is an Italian surname. Notable people with the surname include:

- Davide Fontolan (born 1966), Italian footballer
- Silvano Fontolan (born 1955), Italian footballer
