= Stadio Luigi Ferraris =

Football stadium in Genoa, Italy

Coordinates: 44°24′59″N 8°57′9″E

Luigi Ferraris
- Marassi
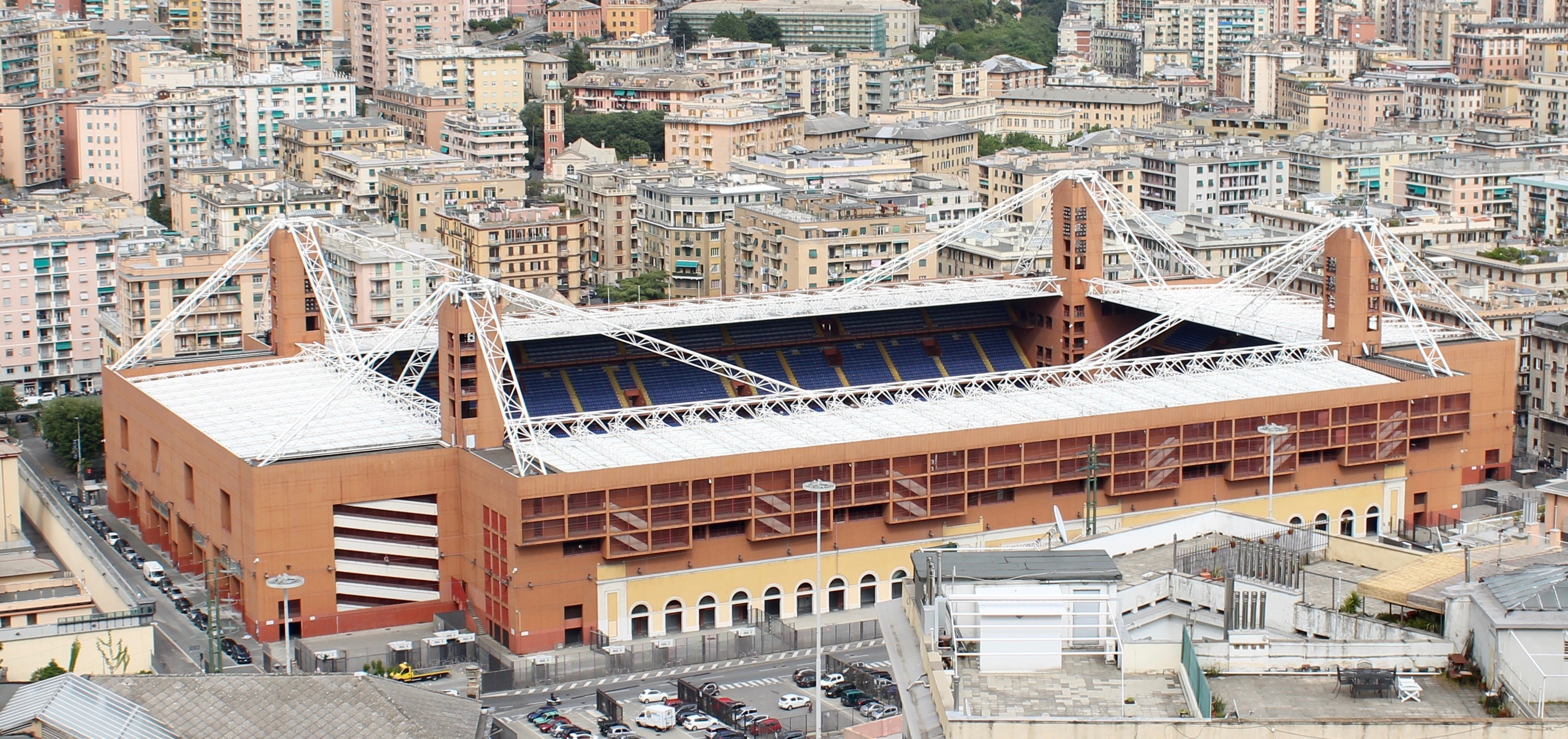
- Interactive map of Luigi Ferraris
- Location: Via Giovanni De Prà 1, Genoa, Italy
- Owner: Municipality of Genoa
- Capacity: 33,205
- Surface: Grass; 105 × 68 meters

Construction
- Opened: 22 January 1911
- Renovated: 1987–1989, 2015, 2018
- Architect: Vittorio Gregotti (1987–1989)

Tenants
- Genoa CFC (1911–present); UC Sampdoria (1946–present); Italy national football team (selected matches) Italy national rugby team (selected matches)

The Stadio Luigi Ferraris, also known as the Marassi from the name of the neighbourhood where it is located, is a multi-use stadium in Genoa, Italy. The home of Genoa CFC and UC Sampdoria football clubs, it opened in 1911 and is the oldest stadium still in use for football and other sports in Italy. Although they were completely rebuilt, their atmosphere continues to be compared to that of English stands, including Anfield's Kop. Aside from football, the stadium has hosted meetings of rugby in the Italian national rugby team and, more rarely, some concerts.

The stadium is named after Luigi Ferraris (1887–1915), an Italian footballer, engineer and soldier who died during WWI.

== Notable matches ==
The stadium was inaugurated on 22 January 1911 with a football match between Genoa and Internazionale, and had a capacity of 20,000. On 22 December 1912, it hosted its first international, in which Italy lost 3–1 to Austria in a friendly.

It also hosted the 1934 World Cup round-of-16 match between Spain and Brazil, and by then its capacity had been expanded to 30,000.

The stadium was dismantled and rebuilt before the 1990 FIFA World Cup, for which it hosted three Group C matches (between Costa Rica, Scotland and Sweden) and a round-of-16 match between the Republic of Ireland and Romania. The Italian architect Vittorio Gregotti was assigned the task, and it shows: "... Luigi Ferraris is bound by right angles. The structure appears as rectangles as the sum of squares, and the motif is repeated throughout: four square gaps in the external wall behind each goal-end terrace; six protruding square-shaped stairwells above the stadium’s main entrance; large square apertures in the sidewalls revealing ramped walkways behind; fifteen smaller quadratic openings in the walls diagonally opposite; rectilinear lines etched into the concrete itself. Holding this diffuse geometry together are four rectangular towers, which support the roof by way of white steel trusses and allow the building to prevail upon the skyline. The roofs themselves are formed of an indistinguishable metal framework, but are countersunk and not visible from street level."

The highest attendance at the Luigi Ferraris was 60,000 on 27 February 1949, for a match between Italy and Portugal.

On 12 October 2010, a Euro 2012 qualifier between Italy and Serbia was abandoned after Serbia fans continued to throw flares onto the pitch and light fireworks. When the game finally began, more flares and fireworks were thrown onto the field and the referee stopped the match after only six minutes of play.

On 29 February 2012, the United States defeated Italy 1–0 in a friendly played at the stadium. It was the first time in almost 100 years that Italy had been defeated in Genoa after 22 December 1912 defeat against Austria, and the first time that the US had ever defeated Italy.

On 14 November 2014, it hosted Italy's end-of-year rugby union international against Argentina who won 20–18.

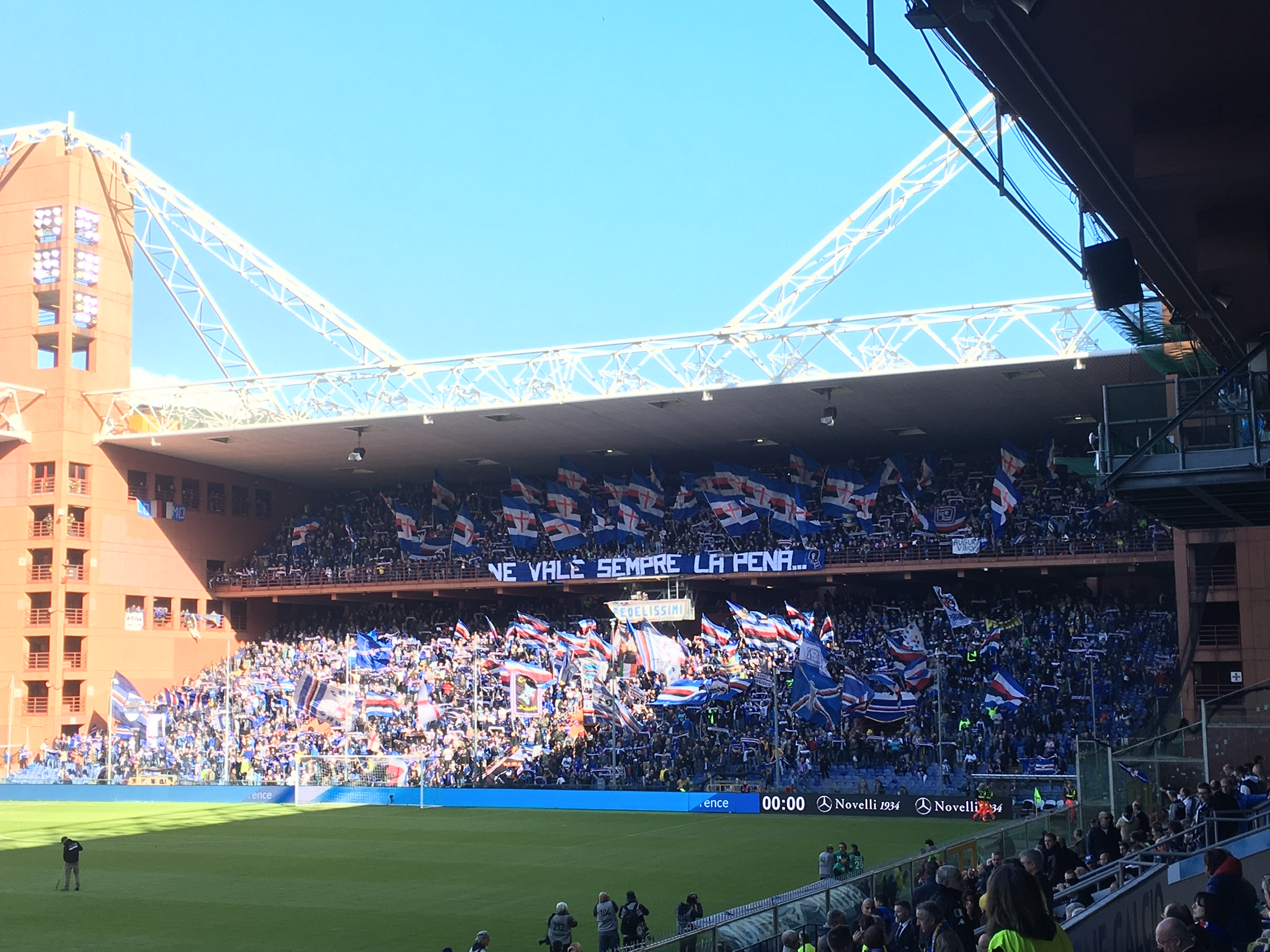
Sampdoria's "Gradinata Sud"

== Average attendances ==
Season	Genoa		Sampdoria	
Season	Average	Tier	Average	Tier
1970–71	?	C1	23,177	A
1971–72	15,357	B	22,527	A
1972–73	30,166	B	21,344	A
1973–74	29,510	A	23,837	A
1974–75	18,840	B	18,724	A
1975–76	24,357	B	22,457	A
1976–77	34,327	A	23,300	A
1977–78	34,300	A	15,133	B
1978–79	19,709	B	13,348	B
1979–80	24,304	B	18,060	B
1980–81	18,894	B	15,802	B
1981–82	34,767	B	21,254	B
1982–83	34,290	A	34,504	A
1983–84	26,706	A	30,162	A
1984–85	11,405	B	32,544	A
1985–86	14,878	B	26,296	A
1986–87	20,002	B	26,655	A
1987–88	9,856	B	17,586	A
1988–89	17,292	B	17,959	A
1989–90	26,789	A	26,120	A
1990–91	31,063	A	31,372	A
1991–92	31,063	A	31,372	A
1992–93	27,803	A	30,856	A

Season	Genoa		Sampdoria	
Season	Average	Tier	Average	Tier
1993–94	26,391	A	30,616	A
1994–95	21,717	A	27,550	A
1995–96	11,229	B	26,070	A
1996–97	13,084	B	26,187	A
1997–98	12,848	B	24,482	A
1998–99	12,961	B	20,463	A
1999–2000	12,928	B	16,709	B
2000–01	15,512	B	16,476	B
2001–02	16,159	B	13,069	B
2002–03	12,371	B	21,802	B
2003–04	17,347	B	26,224	A
2004–05	21,449	B	23,669	A
2005–06	17,577	C1	22,688	A
2006–07	19,934	B	19,036	A
2007–08	24,745	A	21,888	A
2008–09	26,583	A	23,323	A
2009–10	27,007	A	25,240	A
2010–11	23,446	A	23,330	A
2011–12	20,898	A	20,854	B
2012–13	19,740	A	23,123	A
2013–14	20,055	A	22,158	A
2014–15	19,074	A	20,746	A
2015–16	21,025	A	21,350	A

== 1990 FIFA World Cup ==
The stadium was one of the venues of the 1990 FIFA World Cup, and held the following matches:

Date	Team No. 1	Res.	Team No. 2	Round
1990-06-11	Costa Rica	1–0	Scotland	Group C
1990-06-16	Sweden	1–2	Scotland	Group C
1990-06-20	Sweden	1–2	Costa Rica	Group C
1990-06-25	Republic of Ireland	0–0 (5–4 on penalties)	Romania	Round of 16
