= CUS Genova Hockey =

- Full name: CUS Genova Hockey
- League: Serie B
- Founded: 1947 (previously name GIL)
- Home ground: Campo G. Arnaldi; Genoa; Italy (Capacity 99)

Personnel
- Chairman: (Italy) Mauro Nasciuti
- Manager: (Italy) Francesco Ferrero
Home	Away

CUS Genova Hockey is an Italian field hockey club based in Genoa, Italy. The club was formed in 1947 changing name from GIL ("Gioventù Italiana del Littorio", which means "Italian Youth of Littorio") and it won three Italian scudettos in 1949, 1951 and 1954.
