= Marco Pacione =

Italian footballer

Personal information
- Date of birth: 27 July 1963 (age 63)
- Place of birth: Pescara, Italy
- Height: 1.84 m (6 ft 1/2 in)
- Position: Striker

Senior career*
Years	Team	Apps	(Gls)
1982–1985	Atalanta	85	(26)
1985–1986	Juventus	12	(0)
1986–1989	Verona	87	(15)
1989–1990	Torino	30	(6)
1990–1992	Genoa	22	(1)
1992–1993	Reggiana	33	(7)
1994	Mantova	15	(2)
- * Club domestic league appearances and goals

Marco Pacione (born 27 July 1963, in Pescara) is an Italian former professional football player who played as a forward.

== Career ==
Throughout his career, Pacione played for several Italian clubs. He began his career in Serie B with Atalanta in 1982, where he also later made his breakthrough, helping the club to Serie A promotion and the Serie B title in 1984, due to his prolific performances, which saw him score 15 goals, and finish the season as the top scorer in the league; as a result he earned the nickname "Paciogol", for his ability to score decisive goals for his team. He made his Serie A debut the following season, scoring 5 goals.

The promising youngster's consistent performances for Atalanta led to a transfer to Italian giants and defending European Champions Juventus in 1985, where manager Giovanni Trapattoni primarily used him as a substitute or alongside Aldo Serena; his only season with the Turin club was not a positive one, however, as he was often criticised for missing several goalscoring opportunities. He made 12 league appearances that season, 4 in the European Cup, and 23 in total, failing to score once, although he still claimed a league winners-medal as Juventus won the 1985–86 Serie A title (the club's 22nd in total), as well as the 1985 Intercontinental Cup. Pacione drew particular criticism for missing several important chances against Barcelona in the quarter-finals of the 1985–86 European Cup, mistakes which proved to be costly for the club, as due to the resulting defeat, Juventus were ultimately eliminated from the tournament. Due to his inconsistent performances and lack of composure in front of goal, he was soon sold to Verona the following season.

After a disappointing season with Juventus, he refound his form with Verona, where he was able to play more frequently, and earned the appreciation of the fans due to his combative style of play, scoring 4 goals in 28 appearances during his first season with the club. During the next two seasons, he scored 6 goals in 29 appearances during the 1987–88 Serie A season, and 5 goals in 30 appearances during the 1988–89 Serie A season, during which he also scored two goals in a home win over his former club, Juventus, elevating him to hero status with the local fans. During his time with Verona, he also managed two appearances and a goal with the Italian national B Team, making his debut on 18 November 1987.

In 1989, Pacione moved to Torino in Serie B, winning another Serie B title, and scoring 6 goals in 30 appearances. The following season was less successful; he played for Genoa in Serie A, scoring only 1 goal in 18 appearances. The next season, his performances declined further, and he only made 4 appearances, failing to score a single goal.

In the summer of 1992, Pacione transferred to Serie B side Reggiana, where he once again broke into the starting line-up, helping the club to the Serie B title and Serie A promotion, scoring 7 goals in 32 appearances. He made his last Serie A appearance during the 1993–94 season, later moving to Serie C1 side Mantova in January 1994, where he scored 2 goals in 15 appearances; he retired at the end of the season, at the age of 31. In total, he scored over 70 goals throughout his career; he scored 21 goals in 151 Serie A appearances, and 35 goals in 118 Serie B appearances.

== Retirement ==
Following his retirement, Pacione worked as a team manager for Chievo Verona.

== Style of play ==
A talented striker in his youth, Pacione was mainly known for his physical attributes and combative, tenacious style of play, as well as his ability in the air.

== Honours ==
=== Club ===
Atalanta

- Serie B champion: 1983–84.

Juventus

- Serie A champion: 1985–86.
- Intercontinental Cup winner: 1985 (on the roster, but did not play in the game).

Torino

- Serie B champion: 1989–90.

Reggiana

- Serie B champion: 1992–93.

=== Individual ===
- Serie B Top-scorer: 1983–84 (15 goals)
