= Luciano Marangon =

Italian footballer

Personal information
- Date of birth: 21 October 1956 (age 70)
- Place of birth: Quinto di Treviso, Italy
- Height: 1.74 m (5 ft 8 1/2 in)
- Position: Defender

Senior career*
Years	Team	Apps	(Gls)
1974–1975	Juventus	0	(0)
1975–1980	L.R. Vicenza	128	(5)
1980–1981	Napoli	26	(0)
1981–1982	Roma	26	(0)
1982–1985	Verona	82	(2)
1985–1987	Internazionale	22	(0)

International career
1982	Italy	1	(0)
- * Club domestic league appearances and goals

Luciano Marangon (Italian pronunciation: [luˈtʃaːno maraŋˈɡon], Venetian: [maɾaŋˈɡoŋ]; born 21 October 1956) is a retired Italian professional footballer who played as a defender.

His younger brother Fabio Marangon also played football professionally. To distinguish them, Luciano was referred to as Marangon I and Fabio as Marangon II.

== Honours ==
Verona

- Serie A champion: 1984–85
