= Stefano Vavoli =

Italian footballer (1960–2025)

Personal information
- Date of birth: 30 December 1960
- Place of birth: Terracina, Italy
- Date of death: 21 December 2025 (aged 64)
- Place of death: Quartu Sant'Elena, Italy
- Height: 1.86 m (6 ft 1 in)
- Position: Goalkeeper

Youth career
- –1979: Genoa

Senior career*
Years	Team	Apps	(Gls)
1979–1980	Genoa	3	(0)
1980–1981	Pergocrema	12	(0)
1981–1982	Civitavecchia	0	(0)
1982–1983	Entella Bacezza	19	(0)
1983–1984	Sant'Elena	16	(0)
1984–1986	Sorso	32	(0)
1986–1987	Hellas Verona	2	(0)
1987–1988	Massese	10	(0)
1988–1989	Jesi	32	(0)
1989–1990	Afragolese		
1990–1991	Turris	32	(0)
1991–1992	Campania Puteolana	27	(0)
1993–1995	Monteponi Iglesias	21	(0)
1997–1999	Muravera		
- * Club domestic league appearances and goals

Stefano Vavoli (30 December 1960 – 21 December 2025) was an Italian footballer who played as a goalkeeper. He played for Genoa youth teams and he made his debut in Serie B during 1979–80 season. He continued his career in lower series with Pergocrema, Civitavecchia, Entella, Sant'Elena Quartu and Sorso until 1986. During that year he was bought by Verona with whom he played one season in Serie A as the reserve of Giuliano Giuliani. He made his Serie A debut on 12 October 1986 against Udinese and played also another match against Avellino the subsequent week. He then returned to play in Serie C with Massese and some other teams.

Vavoli is one of four footballers born in Terracina to play in Serie A. He died in Quartu Sant'Elena, Italy on 21 December 2025 at the age of 64.
