= Italy national rugby team =

Italy national rugby team may refer to national teams in the different varieties of rugby:

- Italy national rugby union team, often nicknamed the Azzurri, administered by the Federazione Italiana Rugby.
  - Italy national rugby sevens team compete in the World Sevens Series
- Italy national rugby league team, administered by Italian Rugby League XIII.
