= 2004–05 Serie A =

103rd season of top-tier Italian football

Serie A
- Season: 2004–05
- Dates: 11 September 2004 – 29 May 2005
- Champions: None (Juventus were stripped of their title due to Calciopoli scandal)
- Relegated: Bologna; Brescia; Atalanta
- Champions League: Juventus; Milan; Internazionale; Udinese
- UEFA Cup: Sampdoria; Palermo; Roma
- Intertoto Cup: Lazio
- Matches: 380
- Goals: 960 (2.53 per match)
- Top goalscorer: Cristiano Lucarelli (24 goals)
- Highest scoring: Parma 6–4 Livorno
- Average attendance: 26,098

The 2004–05 Serie A (known as the Serie A TIM for sponsorship reasons) was the 103rd season of top-tier Italian football, the 73rd in a round-robin tournament. It was expanded to contain 20 clubs, which played 38 matches against each other, rather than the 34 matches in previous seasons, while relegations were reduced to three. The Coppa Campioni d'Italia was presented to the winners on the pitch for the first time.

The first two teams qualified directly to UEFA Champions League, teams ending in the third and fourth places had to play Champions League qualifications, teams ending in the fifth and sixth places qualified to UEFA Cup (another spot was given to the winner of Coppa Italia), while only the last three teams were to be relegated in Serie B, the Italian second division, following a regulations change.

Juventus finished in first place but were later stripped of the title as a result of the Calciopoli scandal. As a result, there was no winner or runner-up in the 2004-05 competition, but the European competition places for higher positions in the table remained. Milan ended the campaign in second place, however they are not considered runners-up due to the scandal. Udinese qualified for the UEFA Champions League for the first time in its history. Palermo, in its first Serie A campaign in over 30 years, finished in sixth place, qualifying for the UEFA Cup for the first time in its history. Roma qualified for the UEFA Cup as the runners-up in the Coppa Italia because the cup winner, Internazionale, had already qualified for the Champions League.

Two teams, Brescia and Atalanta, were directly relegated to Serie B, while the third relegation place was to be decided among three teams (Fiorentina, Bologna and Parma), counting only the so-called classifica avulsa; that is, the table composed solely by the six matches among the three teams. Bologna and Parma had fewer points, and played the relegation tiebreaker. The tiebreaker was won by Parma, who were defeated 0–1 at home but won 0–2 away in the return match. This method of classifying teams on equal points totals was abolished for the 2005–06 season but returned for the 2022–23 season.

== Personnel and sponsoring ==
Locations of the 2004–05 Serie A teams

Team	Head coach	Kit manufacturer	Shirt sponsor
Atalanta*	(Italy) Delio Rossi	Asics	Promatech
Bologna	(Italy) Carlo Mazzone	Macron	Amica Chips
Brescia	(Italy) Alberto Cavasin	Kappa	Banca Lombarda e Piemontese
Cagliari*	(Italy) Daniele Arrigoni	A-Line	Terra Sarda
Chievo	(Italy) Maurizio D'Angelo	Lotto	Paluani/Columbia TriStar Film Distributors International (Note: As part of the agreement, the logos of the following films distributed by Columbia TriStar Film Distributors International were shown: Anacondas: The Hunt for the Blood Orchid, Resident Evil: Apocalypse, The Forgotten, Bad Santa and Hitch.)
Fiorentina*	(Italy) Dino Zoff	Adidas	Toyota
Internazionale	(Italy) Roberto Mancini	Nike	Pirelli
Juventus	(Italy) Fabio Capello	Nike	Sky Sport/Tamoil (in UEFA matches)
Lazio	(Italy) Giuseppe Papadopulo	Puma	Parmacotto
Lecce	(Czech Republic) Zdeněk Zeman	Asics	Salento
Livorno*	(Italy) Roberto Donadoni	Asics	Banca Carige
Messina*	(Italy) Bortolo Mutti	Legea	Caffè Miscela d'Oro, Regione Siciliana/Air Malta
Milan	(Italy) Carlo Ancelotti	Adidas	Opel
Parma	(Italy) Pietro Carmignani	Champion	Champion
Palermo*	(Italy) Francesco Guidolin	Lotto	+39 Challenge, Provincia di Palermo
Reggina	(Italy) Walter Mazzarri	Asics	Gicos, Stocco&Stocco
Roma	(Italy) Bruno Conti	Diadora	Mazda
Sampdoria	(Italy) Walter Novellino	Kappa	Erg
Siena	(Italy) Luigi De Canio	Lotto	Banca Monte dei Paschi di Siena
Udinese	(Italy) Luciano Spalletti	Le Coq Sportif	Kia Motors

(*) Promoted from Serie B.

== League table ==
Pos	Team	Pld	W	D	L	GF	GA	GD	Pts	Qualification or relegation
1	Juventus (Note: Juventus were stripped of the title during the 2005–06 Serie A season, because of the 2006 Italian football scandal.)	38	26	8	4	67	27	+40	86	Champions League group stage
2	Milan	38	23	10	5	63	28	+35	79	Champions League group stage
3	Internazionale	38	18	18	2	65	37	+28	72	Champions League third qualifying round
4	Udinese	38	17	11	10	56	40	+16	62	Champions League third qualifying round
5	Sampdoria	38	17	10	11	42	29	+13	61	UEFA Cup first round
6	Palermo	38	12	17	9	48	44	+4	53	UEFA Cup first round
7	Messina	38	12	12	14	44	52	−8	48	
8	Roma (Note: Roma gained entry to the 2005–06 UEFA Cup as 2004–05 Coppa Italia runners-up: champions Internazionale qualified to the 2005–06 UEFA Champions League.)	38	11	12	15	55	58	−3	45	UEFA Cup first round
9	Livorno	38	11	12	15	49	60	−11	45	
10	Reggina	38	10	14	14	36	45	−9	44	
11	Lecce	38	10	14	14	66	73	−7	44	
12	Cagliari	38	10	14	14	51	60	−9	44	
13	Lazio (Note: Lazio gained entry to the 2005 UEFA Intertoto Cup after Messina and Livorno renounced.)	38	11	11	16	48	53	−5	44	Intertoto Cup third round
14	Siena	38	9	16	13	44	55	−11	43	
15	Chievo	38	11	10	17	32	49	−17	43	
16	Fiorentina	38	9	15	14	42	50	−8	42	
17	Parma	38	10	12	16	48	65	−17	42	Relegation tie-breaker
18	Bologna (R)	38	9	15	14	33	36	−3	42	Serie B after tie-breaker
19	Brescia (R)	38	11	8	19	37	54	−17	41	Relegation to Serie B
20	Atalanta (R)	38	8	11	19	34	45	−11	35	Relegation to Serie B

Source: 2004–05 Serie A, RSSSF.com, Soccerway
Rules for classification: 1) Points; 2) Head-to-head points; 3) Head-to-head goal difference; 4) Goal difference; 5) Goals scored; 6) Draw. (Note: Fiorentina remained in Serie A as head-to-head record was used to create a sole two-legged tiebreaker).
(R) Relegated

== Results ==
Home \ Away	ATA	BOL	BRE	CAG	CHV	FIO	INT	JUV	LAZ	LCE	LIV	MES	MIL	PAL	PAR	REG	ROM	SAM	SIE	UDI
Atalanta		2–0	0–0	2–2	3–0	1–0	2–3	1–2	1–1	2–2	1–0	2–1	1–2	1–0	1–0	0–1	0–1	0–0	1–1	0–1
Bologna	2–1		1–2	1–0	3–1	0–0	0–1	0–1	1–2	0–0	0–0	2–2	0–2	1–1	3–1	2–0	3–1	0–0	1–1	0–1
Brescia	1–0	1–1		2–0	1–0	1–1	0–3	0–3	0–2	0–1	2–3	2–1	0–0	0–2	3–1	2–0	0–1	0–1	0–1	0–1
Cagliari	3–3	1–0	2–1		4–2	1–0	3–3	1–1	1–1	3–1	0–0	2–1	0–1	0–0	2–1	1–1	3–0	0–0	2–0	1–1
Chievo	1–0	1–0	3–1	1–1		1–2	2–2	0–1	0–1	2–1	1–0	1–0	0–1	2–1	2–0	0–0	2–2	0–2	1–3	0–0
Fiorentina	0–0	1–0	3–0	2–1	2–0		1–1	3–3	2–3	4–0	1–1	1–1	1–2	1–2	2–1	2–1	1–2	0–2	0–0	2–2
Internazionale	1–0	2–2	1–0	2–0	1–1	3–2		2–2	1–1	2–1	1–0	5–0	0–1	1–1	2–2	0–0	2–0	3–2	2–0	3–1
Juventus	2–0	2–1	2–0	4–2	3–0	1–0	0–1		2–1	5–2	4–2	2–1	0–0	1–1	2–0	1–0	2–0	0–1	3–0	2–1
Lazio	2–1	2–1	0–0	2–3	0–1	1–1	1–1	0–1		3–3	3–1	2–0	1–2	1–3	2–0	1–1	3–1	1–2	1–1	0–1
Lecce	1–0	1–1	4–1	3–1	3–0	2–2	2–2	0–1	5–3		3–2	1–0	2–2	2–0	3–3	1–1	1–1	1–4	2–2	3–4
Livorno	1–1	1–0	2–1	3–3	1–2	2–0	0–2	2–2	1–0	1–0		3–1	1–0	2–2	2–0	1–1	0–2	1–0	3–6	1–2
Messina	1–0	0–0	2–0	2–1	0–0	1–1	2–1	0–0	1–0	1–4	1–1		1–4	0–0	1–0	2–1	4–3	2–2	4–1	1–0
Milan	3–0	0–1	1–1	1–0	1–0	6–0	0–0	0–1	2–1	5–2	2–2	1–2		3–3	3–0	3–1	1–1	1–0	2–1	3–1
Palermo	1–0	1–0	3–3	3–0	2–2	0–0	0–2	1–0	3–3	3–2	1–2	2–1	0–0		1–1	1–1	2–0	2–0	1–0	1–5
Parma	2–2	1–2	2–1	3–2	2–2	0–0	2–2	1–1	3–1	2–1	6–4	0–0	1–2	3–3		1–0	2–1	1–1	0–0	1–0
Reggina	0–0	1–1	1–3	3–2	1–0	1–2	0–0	2–1	2–1	2–2	2–1	0–2	0–1	1–0	1–3		1–0	0–1	3–3	0–0
Roma	2–1	1–1	2–2	5–1	0–0	1–0	3–3	1–2	0–0	2–2	3–0	3–2	0–2	1–1	5–1	1–2		1–1	0–2	0–3
Sampdoria	1–2	0–0	0–1	0–0	1–0	3–0	0–1	0–3	0–1	3–0	2–0	1–0	0–1	1–0	1–0	3–2	2–1		1–1	2–0
Siena	2–1	1–1	2–3	2–2	0–1	1–0	2–2	0–3	1–0	1–1	1–1	2–2	2–1	0–0	0–1	0–0	0–4	2–1		2–3
Udinese	2–1	0–1	1–2	2–0	3–0	2–2	1–1	0–1	3–0	2–1	1–1	1–1	1–1	1–0	4–0	0–2	3–3	1–1	1–0	

Source: lega-calcio.it (in Italian)
Legend: Blue = home team win; Yellow = draw; Red = away team win.

== Relegation tie-breaker ==
14 June 2005
20:30 CEST

Parma	0–1	Bologna
		Tare 18'

Stadio Ennio Tardini, Parma
Attendance: 27,333
Referee: Stefano Farina (Novi Ligure)

18 June 2005
20:30 CEST

Bologna	0–2	Parma
		Cardone 17'; Gilardino 45+2'

Stadio Renato Dall'Ara, Bologna
Attendance: 31,882
Referee: Pierluigi Collina (Viareggio)

Bologna relegated to Serie B.

== Top goalscorers ==
Rank	Player	Club	Goals
1	(Italy) Cristiano Lucarelli	Livorno	24
2	(Italy) Alberto Gilardino	Parma	23
3	(Italy) Vincenzo Montella	Roma	21
4	(Italy) Luca Toni	Palermo	20
5	(Serbia and Montenegro) Mirko Vučinić	Lecce	19
6	(Ukraine) Andriy Shevchenko	Milan	17
7	(Brazil) Adriano	Internazionale	16
7	(Italy) Mauro Esposito	Cagliari	16
7	(Sweden) Zlatan Ibrahimović	Juventus	16
10	(Italy) David Di Michele	Udinese	15
11	(Italy) Alessandro Del Piero	Juventus	14
11	(Italy) Francesco Flachi	Sampdoria	14
13	(Bulgaria) Valeri Bojinov	Lecce, Fiorentina	13
13	(Italy) Tommaso Rocchi	Lazio	13
13	(Italy) Vincenzo Iaquinta	Udinese	13
13	(Italy) Christian Vieri	Internazionale	13

== Attendances ==
#	Club	Avg. attendance	Highest
1	AC Milan	63,595	79,775
2	Internazionale	57,295	78,471
3	Roma	49,631	69,488
4	Lazio	37,516	64,734
5	Fiorentina	34,202	45,909
6	Palermo	33,230	34,271
7	Messina	29,737	37,582
8	Juventus	26,429	54,181
9	Sampdoria	23,669	32,102
10	Bologna	19,004	30,796
11	Reggina	16,261	21,445
12	Lecce	16,114	30,482
13	Udinese	15,810	24,504
14	Livorno	15,334	19,726
15	Atalanta	14,689	21,962
16	Parma	14,044	23,010
17	Cagliari	13,579	22,500
18	Chievo	12,103	29,450
19	Siena	9,461	14,604
20	Brescia	7,749	16,504

== References and sources ==
- Almanacco Illustrato del Calcio 2006, Panini Edizioni, Modena, November 2006
