= Preben Elkjær =

Danish footballer (born 1957)

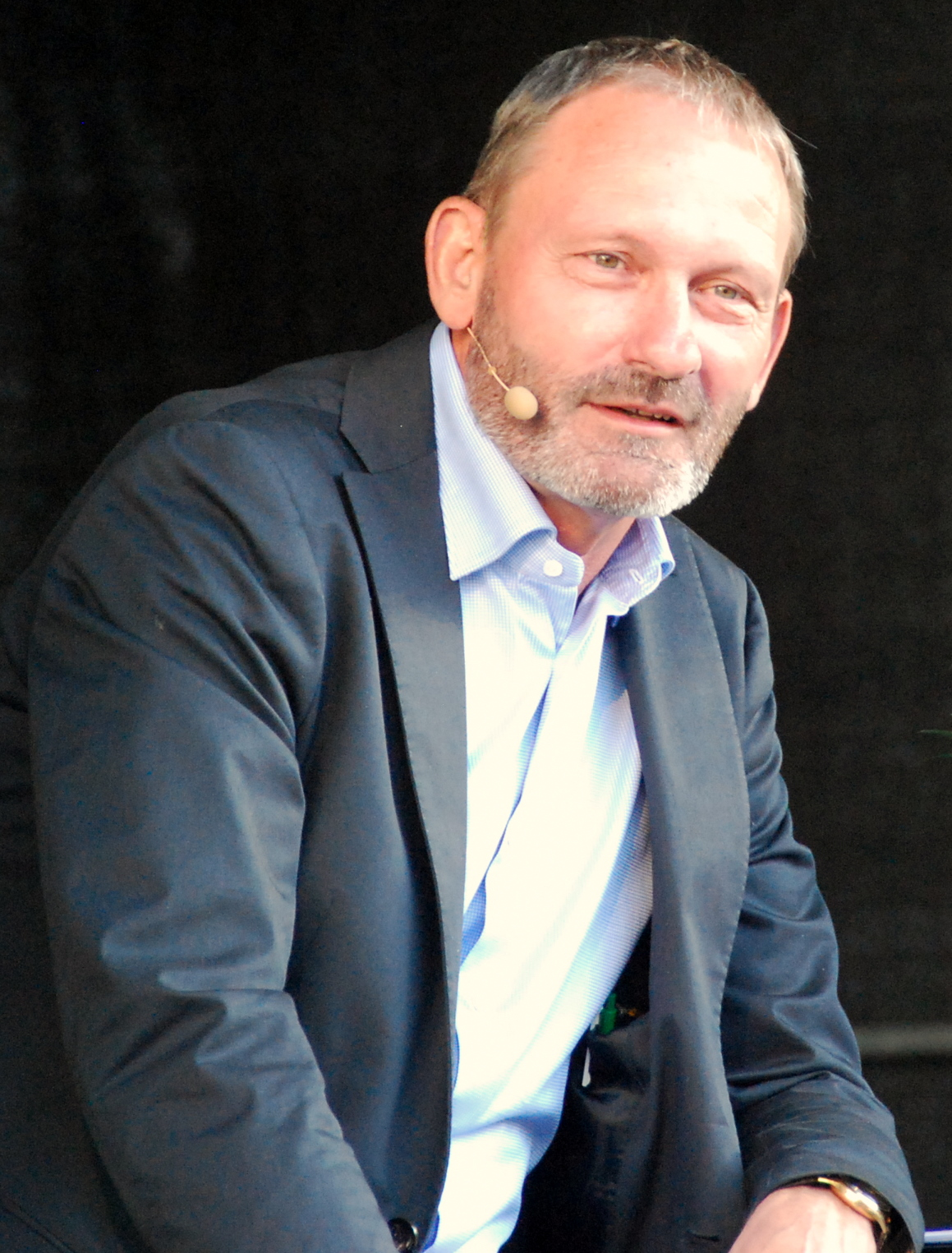
- Elkjær in 2011 in Viborg

Personal information
- Full name: Preben Elkjær Larsen
- Date of birth: 11 September 1957 (age 69)
- Place of birth: Copenhagen, Denmark
- Height: 1.82 m (6 ft 0 in)
- Position: Striker

Youth career
- 1963–1973: Frederiksberg BK
- 1973–1974: KB
- 1974–1975: Frederiksberg BK

Senior career*
Years	Team	Apps	(Gls)
1976	Vanløse	15	(7)
1976–1978	1. FC Köln	9	(1)
1978–1984	Lokeren	190	(98)
1984–1988	Hellas Verona	91	(32)
1988–1990	Vejle	39	(12)
Total		333	(143)

International career
1975–1976	Denmark U19	11	(6)
1976–1979	Denmark U21	9	(9)
1977–1988	Denmark	69	(38)

Managerial career
- 1995–1996: Silkeborg
- * Club domestic league appearances and goals

Preben Elkjær Larsen (Danish pronunciation: [ˈelˌkʰeˀɐ̯]; born 11 September 1957) is a Danish former professional footballer who played as a striker.

Amongst others, he played with Hellas Verona in Italy, helping the club to the only major title of its history, the 1985 Serie A. Additionally, Elkjær scored 38 goals for the Denmark national team in 11 years, being a leading figure for the Danish side under coach Sepp Piontek that played at the Euro 1984 and the 1986 World Cup (a first-ever appearance), often hailed as the golden generation of Danish football by their countrymen. Elkjær won the Bronze Ball award at the latter competition.

Widely regarded as one of the best forwards of the 1980s, Elkjær finished second in the Ballon d'Or awards in 1985, having been placed third the previous year, and going on to finish fourth in 1986. In Verona he is still remembered fondly, having earned the persisting nickname "Il sindaco" (the mayor) during his stint for the club. To this day, at least a few hundred voters in the city continue to write his name on their ballots at the mayoral elections. Renowned for his goal-scoring abilities and persona, he also remains one of the most popular sports personalities in his native Denmark. A well-known story in Copenhagen states that during the celebrations of the Danish qualification for the 1986 World Cup, religious graffiti emerged on a wall in Copenhagen, asking "What would we do if Jesus returned tomorrow?". Overnight, an answer had been sprayed on the wall replying "Then we'll move Elkjær out wide".

== Club career ==
=== Germany and Belgium ===
Born 11 September 1957, in Copenhagen, Elkjær's career started with Vanløse IF in 1976, where he stayed for just one season, playing 15 games and scoring seven goals. He then joined 1. FC Köln in Germany, at the time one of Europe's leading clubs. With the team, he won the 1978 domestic Cup (his entire campaign consisted of nine minutes in the final, against Hertha BSC), but never got on with the manager or the harsh, disciplined atmosphere of a German dressing room, and eventually left. One falling out with the coach Hennes Weisweiler earned a legendary status in Denmark: Weisweiler approached Elkjær and said that he had been informed that the player had spent the early-morning hours at a nightclub in the company of a bottle of whiskey and a lady, and wanted to know if that was true. Elkjær replied that it was a lie; in fact it was a bottle of vodka and two ladies.

In February 1978, Elkjær moved to K.S.C. Lokeren Oost-Vlaanderen in Belgium where he stayed for six years, the longest spell at any club during his entire career. There, he earned two nicknames: Chefen fra Lokeren (Lit: The Boss from Lokeren) and Den Gale Mand fra Lokeren (Lit: The Crazy Man from Lokeren), surpassing the 100-goal mark in official matches (98 in the Belgian First Division alone).

=== Verona ===
Twenty-seven-year-old Elkjær signed for Hellas Verona F.C. in Italy in the summer of 1984 and, in his first season with the team, he played an instrumental role as it won the Serie A title, the scudetto, for the first time in its history; he aided that conquest with a solo left-flank run against Juventus (a 2–0 home win), where he lost his right boot, kept on running with the ball and ended up shooting home with his bootless right foot. That season, Elkjær was Hellas Verona's most costly player purchase.

In 1984, Elkjær finished third and in 1985 second in the European Footballer of the Year awards, both times surpassed by Michel Platini, who played for Juventus. During his four-year spell at Verona, he never scored ten league goals in a season, but never netted fewer than seven goals, for a total of 48 official goals.

=== Return to Denmark and retirement ===
In 1988, Elkjær made a comeback in Danish football with Vejle BK. He came to the club as the biggest star in the country, and attracted great crowds to the club's matches. Aged 31, he suffered a number of injuries while at Vejle, and had a hard time living up to the high expectations of the crowds, eventually retiring two years later, having only appeared in a total of 26 matches combined.

== International career ==
While playing youth football for Frederiksberg Boldklub, Elkjær made his debut for the Danish under-19 national team, in October 1975. He played a total 11 games and scored six goals for the under-19 national team, including three in three games at the 1975 UEFA European Under-19 Football Championship.

Elkjær made his debut for the under-21s in June 1976, scoring nine times in as many games; this included three goals in the quarter-finals of the 1978 European Under-21 Championship against Bulgaria, though Denmark were eliminated on the away goals rule.

On 22 June 1977, aged 19 years and 284 days, Elkjær made his debut for the senior national team, scoring both goals in a 2–1 win against Finland. He played a prominent role in UEFA Euro 1984, scoring two goals in four games, which helped pave the way for his move to Italian football. During the tournament, Denmark played attractive attacking football, but went out at the semi-final stage, losing to Spain on penalties. Elkjær missed Denmark's last penalty kick attempt, sending the ball high over the goal.

Elkjær also represented Denmark at the 1986 FIFA World Cup as Denmark had qualified for that competition for the first time, eventually progressing from the group stage as winners, only to be once again knocked out by Spain. During the tournament, he scored four goals, including a hat-trick against Uruguay, being named the most dynamic and powerful striker of the tournament, and winning the Bronze Ball award as the third best player.

Euro 1988 was Elkjær's last tournament participation for him. On 14 June 1988, he played the last game for his country, aged 30 years and 277 days, as Denmark lost 2–0 to West Germany, finishing with three group stage defeats. In total, he played 69 international games, and scored 38 goals.

== Style of play ==
Elkjær is regarded as one of Denmark's all-time greatest forwards. A notorious smoker, his playing style was, however, not short of breath, being dominated by a rock-like determination. He never seemed to give up on a lost ball – from time to time resulting in a goal.

His style was an unorthodox combination of physical confrontations and great dribbling abilities. Described as "powerful and dynamic", Elkjær could hardly be stopped when going on his own, one of his trademarks. His aggression was matched by few, and whenever he would receive the ball with his back to the goal he would immediately turn with the ball and attempt to head for goal.

Elkjær's aggressive style of play paired well with the calmness and vision of the younger Michael Laudrup when they played side by side on the national team, and they were named the "most effective" attacking duo of the 1986 World Cup.

At Hellas Verona, Preben Elkjær was one of the few players in the Serie A that didn't have a specific role. Other than being expected to score goals, he was mostly given a carte blanche by coach Osvaldo Bagnoli.

== After football ==
After his retirement from playing, Elkjær took on the job as head coach of Silkeborg IF in the Danish Superliga in 1995.

In December 1996, he left the club to head TV sports channel TVS, a newly formed corporation between national TV stations DR and TV2, the Danish Football Association and telecompany Tele Danmark. The station was not a success, and was closed within a year of its opening.

Additionally, he works as a UEFA Champions League pundit for Danish TV3+, alongside Michael Laudrup and host Peter Grønborg. In October 2019 he had an operation to remove a gallstone in Belgium.

== Personal life ==
Elkjær authored an autobiography, Guldkjær. He was nicknamed both "Guldkjær" and "Målkjær", Danish for, respectively, "Goldkjær" and "Goalkjær". In the book, he mostly recalls his stay in Italy with Hellas Verona.

Elkjær had several cars. One of them was a Porsche. He received the car as a token of gratefulness from the waiter at a restaurant after he helped Hellas Verona capture the Scudetto. To this day, Verona's 1985 Scudetto is their only one.

After the 1984 Euros, where Denmark made it to the semi-finals, the Danish ministre of culture, Mimi Stilling Jacobsen, asked Elkjær to dance at a reception. He agreed.

== Career statistics ==
=== International ===
List of international goals scored by Preben Elkjær (Note: Scores and results list Denmark's goal tally first, score column indicates score after each Elkjær goal.)
No.	Date	Venue	Opponent	Score	Result	Competition	Ref.
1	22 June 1977	Olympic Stadium, Helsinki, Finland	Finland	1–0	2–1	1972–77 Nordic Football Championship	
2	22 June 1977	Olympic Stadium, Helsinki, Finland	Finland	2–0	2–1	1972–77 Nordic Football Championship	
3	31 May 1978	Ullevaal Stadion, Oslo, Norway	Norway	2–1	2–1	1978–80 Nordic Football Championship	
4	6 June 1979	Idrætspark, Copenhagen, Denmark	Northern Ireland	1–0	4–0	UEFA Euro 1980 qualification	
5	6 June 1979	Idrætspark, Copenhagen, Denmark	Northern Ireland	2–0	4–0	UEFA Euro 1980 qualification	
6	6 June 1979	Idrætspark, Copenhagen, Denmark	Northern Ireland	4–0	4–0	UEFA Euro 1980 qualification	
7	26 September 1979	Idrætspark, Copenhagen, Denmark	Finland	1–0	1–0	1978–80 Nordic Football Championship	
8	14 November 1979	Estadio Ramón de Carranza, Cádiz, Spain	Spain	1–0	3–1	Friendly	
9	14 November 1979	Estadio Ramón de Carranza, Cádiz, Spain	Spain	3–1	3–1	Friendly	
10	4 June 1980	Idrætspark, Copenhagen, Denmark	Norway	3–1	3–1	1978–80 Nordic Football Championship	
11	19 November 1980	Idrætspark, Copenhagen, Denmark	Luxembourg	3–0	4–0	1982 FIFA World Cup qualification	
12	1 May 1981	Municipal Stadium, Luxembourg City, Luxembourg	Luxembourg	1–1	2–1	1982 FIFA World Cup qualification	
13	14 May 1981	Malmö Stadion, Malmö, Sweden	Sweden	2–0	2–1	1981–85 Nordic Football Championship	
14	9 September 1981	Idrætspark, Copenhagen, Denmark	Yugoslavia	1–1	1–2	1982 FIFA World Cup qualification	
15	23 September 1981	Idrætspark, Copenhagen, Denmark	Norway	1–0	2–1	Friendly	
16	14 October 1981	Charilaou Ground, Thessaloniki, Greece	Greece	3–1	3–2	1982 FIFA World Cup qualification	
17	27 May 1982	Idrætspark, Copenhagen, Denmark	Belgium	1–0	1–0	Friendly	
18	1 June 1983	Idrætspark, Copenhagen, Denmark	Hungary	1–0	3–1	UEFA Euro 1984 qualification	
19	12 October 1983	Idrætspark, Copenhagen, Denmark	Luxembourg	3–0	6–0	UEFA Euro 1984 qualification	
20	12 October 1983	Idrætspark, Copenhagen, Denmark	Luxembourg	4–0	6–0	UEFA Euro 1984 qualification	
21	16 November 1983	Olympic Stadium, Athens, Greece	Greece	1–0	2–0	UEFA Euro 1984 qualification	
22	6 June 1984	Ullevi, Gothenburg, Sweden	Sweden	1–0	1–0	Friendly	
23	16 June 1984	Stade de Gerland, Lyon, France	Yugoslavia	4–0	5–0	UEFA Euro 1984	
24	19 June 1984	Stade de la Meinau, Strasbourg, France	Belgium	3–2	3–2	UEFA Euro 1984	
25	26 September 1984	Idrætspark, Copenhagen, Denmark	Norway	1–0	1–0	1986 FIFA World Cup qualification	
26	14 November 1984	Idrætspark, Copenhagen, Denmark	Republic of Ireland	1–0	3–0	1986 FIFA World Cup qualification	
27	14 November 1984	Idrætspark, Copenhagen, Denmark	Republic of Ireland	2–0	3–0	1986 FIFA World Cup qualification	
28	5 June 1985	Idrætspark, Copenhagen, Denmark	Soviet Union	1–0	4–2	1986 FIFA World Cup qualification	
29	5 June 1985	Idrætspark, Copenhagen, Denmark	Soviet Union	2–0	4–2	1986 FIFA World Cup qualification	
30	16 October 1985	Ullevaal Stadion, Oslo, Norway	Norway	3–1	5–1	1986 FIFA World Cup qualification	
31	13 November 1985	Lansdowne Road, Dublin, Republic of Ireland	Republic of Ireland	1–1	4–1	1986 FIFA World Cup qualification	
32	13 November 1985	Lansdowne Road, Dublin, Republic of Ireland	Republic of Ireland	4–1	4–1	1986 FIFA World Cup qualification	
33	16 May 1986	Idrætspark, Copenhagen, Denmark	Poland	1–0	1–0	Friendly	
34	4 June 1986	Estadio Neza 86, Nezahualcóyotl, Mexico	Scotland	1–0	1–0	1986 FIFA World Cup	
35	8 June 1986	Estadio Neza 86, Nezahualcóyotl, Mexico	Uruguay	1–0	6–1	1986 FIFA World Cup	
36	8 June 1986	Estadio Neza 86, Nezahualcóyotl, Mexico	Uruguay	4–1	6–1	1986 FIFA World Cup	
37	8 June 1986	Estadio Neza 86, Nezahualcóyotl, Mexico	Uruguay	5–1	6–1	1986 FIFA World Cup	
38	14 October 1987	Idrætspark, Copenhagen, Denmark	Wales	1–0	1–0	UEFA Euro 1988 qualification	

== Honours ==
=== Player ===
1. FC Köln

- Bundesliga: 1977–78
- DFB-Pokal: 1976–77, 1977–78

Verona F.C.

- Serie A: 1984–85

=== Manager ===
Silkeborg

- UEFA Intertoto Cup: 1996

=== Individual ===
- Danish Player of the Year: 1984
- Ballon d'Or: runner-up 1985, third place 1984
- Onze de Bronze: 1984
- Onze d'Argent: 1985
- FIFA World Cup Bronze Ball: 1986
- FIFA World Cup All-Star Team: 1986
- Danish Football Hall of Fame
- World Soccer The Greatest Players of the 20th century: The 100 Greatest Footballers of All Time
