= Antonio Di Gennaro =

Italian footballer (born 1958)

Antonio di Gennaro
Personal information
- Full name: Antonio di Gennaro
- Date of birth: 5 October 1958 (age 68)
- Place of birth: Florence, Italy
- Height: 1.77 m (5 ft 9 1/2 in)
- Position: Midfielder

Senior career*
Years	Team	Apps	(Gls)
1976–1980	Fiorentina	44	(5)
1980–1981	Perugia	24	(3)
1981–1988	Verona	182	(18)
1988–1991	Bari	64	(4)
1991–1992	Barletta	28	(3)
Total		342	(33)

International career
1984–1986	Italy	15	(4)
- * Club domestic league appearances and goals

Antonio di Gennaro (Italian pronunciation: [anˈtɔːnjo di dʒenˈnaːro]; born 5 October 1958) is an Italian former footballer who played as a midfielder.

== Club career ==
During his club career, Di Gennaro played for Fiorentina (1976–80), Perugia (1980–81), Hellas Verona (1981–88) and Bari (1988–91). He made his professional debut with his hometown club Fiorentina at the age of 18, although, despite his talent, he struggled to find space in the club due to the presence of the team's star playmaker Giancarlo Antognoni, with whom Di Gennaro faced competition for a starting spot as the two did not play well alongside each other. As a result, he moved to Perugia during the 1980–81 season, in order to gain more playing time, although it proved to be a negative season, as Perugia were ultimately relegated to Serie B at the end of the campaign. Di Gennaro switched clubs once again the following season, joining Verona; whilst at the club, he became a key player, serving as the team's main playmaker in midfield. He helped lead the club from Serie B to Serie A in his first season, and was also a member of the side that won the club's first ever Serie A title during the 1984–85 season, under manager Osvaldo Bagnoli; in total, Di Gennaro made 182 appearances for Verona, scoring 18 goals. He later joined Bari in 1988, where he served as the team's captain, helping the team to obtain promotion to Serie A and winning the Mitropa Cup in 1990, before retiring in 1991, after helping the club avoid relegation.

== International career ==
At international level, Di Gennaro earned 15 caps and scored 4 goals for the Italy national football team between 1984 and 1986, including playing in all four Italian matches at the 1986 FIFA World Cup, where Italy were eliminated by France in the round of 16. He made his international debut on 3 November 1984, in a 1–1 draw against Switzerland, and all 15 of his caps were won whilst he was playing his club football with Verona.

== Style of play ==
Described as a "modern" footballer, Di Gennaro was a quick, agile, versatile and well-rounded player, with good dribbling skills, who was known for his ability to adapt to different playing situations on the pitch, and was therefore capable of playing in several midfield positions. He stood out throughout his career for his pace work-rate, stamina, defensive skills, and ball winning abilities, as well as his creativity and offensive capabilities in midfield; due to his wide range of skills, he was capable of playing both as a defensive midfielder, or in the centre as a deep-lying playmaker, courtesy of his vision, technique, range of passing and strong mentality, which enabled him to start attacking plays or distribute the ball quickly to his teammates after winning back possession. Although he was mainly a team-player, he also had an ability to get forward, and was a powerful and accurate striker of the ball, and could also function as an advanced playmaker. In addition to his footballing ability, he was known for his leadership and humorous personality.

== After retirement ==
Following his retirement, Di Gennaro worked for a time as one of the directors of his former club, Fiorentina.

== Honours ==
Verona

- Serie B: 1981–82
- Serie A: 1984–85

Bari

- Mitropa Cup: 1990
