= Osvaldo Bagnoli =

Italian footballer (1935–2026)

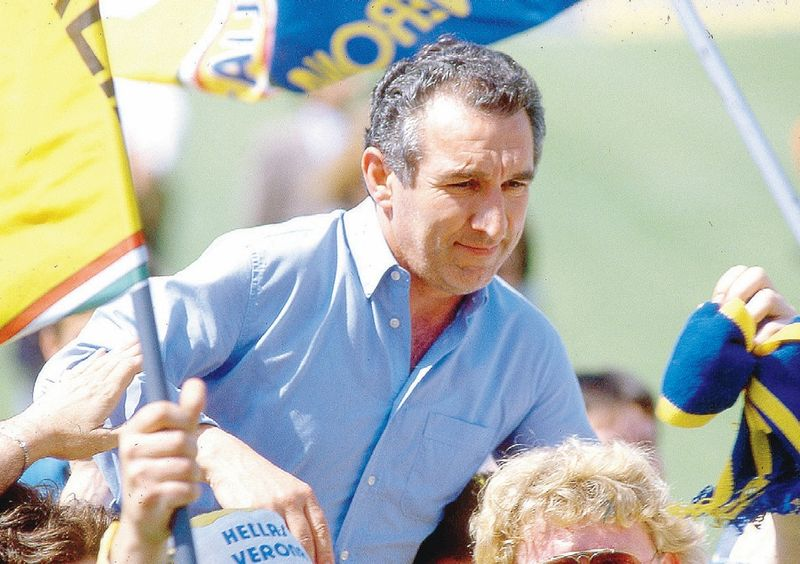
- Bagnoli in 1985

Personal information
- Date of birth: 3 July 1935
- Place of birth: Milan, Italy
- Date of death: 17 July 2026 (aged 91)
- Place of death: Verona, Italy
- Height: 1.70 m (5 ft 7 in)
- Position: Midfielder

Youth career
- –1954: Ausonia 1931
- 1954–1955: AC Milan

Senior career*
Years	Team	Apps	(Gls)
1955–1957	AC Milan	18	(2)
1957–1960	Hellas Verona	97	(27)
1960–1961	Udinese	11	(1)
1961–1964	Catanzaro	102	(22)
1964–1967	SPAL	92	(12)
1967–1968	Udinese	22	(4)
1968–1973	Verbania	135	(23)
Total		477	(91)

Managerial career
- 1973–1974: Solbiatese
- 1975–1977: Como
- 1977–1978: Rimini
- 1978–1979: Fano
- 1979–1981: Cesena
- 1981–1990: Hellas Verona
- 1990–1992: Genoa
- 1992–1994: Inter Milan
- * Club domestic league appearances and goals

Osvaldo Bagnoli (3 July 1935 – 17 July 2026) was an Italian football coach and player who played as a midfielder.

Although he had played for AC Milan and coached Inter Milan, he is best known for his time with Hellas Verona, both as a player and, in particular, as a manager, having been in charge of the team for nine consecutive seasons, including the victorious 1984–85 Serie A campaign, which became the first ever Scudetto in the club's history. For his achievements, he was nicknamed Il Mago della Bovisa ("the wizard of Bovisa," in English, the district in which he was born in his hometown Milan).

He was also the first coach to have led Genoa into European competitions, reaching the UEFA Cup semi-finals during the club's debut campaign.

== Playing career ==
Born in the working-class Bovisa district of Milan, Bagnoli began his professional career as a midfielder with his hometown club AC Milan in 1955. Although he struggled to break into the starting line-up, due to the presence of several talented players in the first team, he was able to make his top flight debut with the club in his first season and subsequently won both the Serie A title and the Latin Cup during the 1956–57 season. He later joined Verona in 1957, where he became an important figure with the club. In his first season he scored 3 goals in 23 appearances, although he was unable to prevent the club's relegation to Serie B. In the following three seasons however, he excelled, scoring 25 goals in 74 appearances in Serie B. He later had two separate season long spells with Udinese, which were separated by two three seasons stints at Catanzaro and SPAL respectively. He ended his career in 1973, with Serie C side Verbania.

== Managerial career ==
During his coaching career, Bagnoli is best known for being the manager which led an underdog Verona side to its first (and so far the only) Serie A title during the 1984–85 season; Bagnoli was in charge of a team which featured several promising players who had been unable to fulfil their potential until then, such as Pietro Fanna, Roberto Tricella, and Antonio Di Gennaro, but who later played a key role in the club's league title success as they matured. Bagnoli was the club's head coach from 1981 until 1990; in addition to winning the league title in 1985, during his time with the club, he helped Verona obtain promotion to Serie A in his first season, winning the 1981–82 Serie B title, and the following season, he led Verona to a fourth-place finish in the league and the Coppa Italia final, qualifying for the UEFA Cup. He left the club after they were relegated to Serie B once again at the end of the 1989–90 season.

Prior to coaching Verona, Bagnoli also managed Solbiatese, Como, Rimini, and Fano, helping the latter side to obtain promotion to Serie C1 during the 1978–79 season after capturing the Serie C2 title.

Bagnoli later also coached a number of other Serie A teams throughout his career, including Genoa and Inter Milan: in the 1990–91 season, Bagnoli took Genoa to fourth place in the final league standings in his first year in charge; it was the team's best finishing position in the top Italian division for more than 50 years. The following season, he helped Genoa to the UEFA Cup semi-finals, only to lose out to the eventual champions Ajax. He later helped Inter to a second-place finish in the league during the 1992–93 season; Bagnoli's second season at the club was less successful, however, and Inter's poor results in the league eventually led to his dismissal, after which he retired.

== After retirement ==
On 20 January 2018, Bagnoli was named Hellas Verona's honorary president.

== Personal life ==
Bagnoli was a socialist; Silvio Berlusconi, the president of AC Milan, reportedly considered Bagnoli for the position of the team's head coach following Arrigo Sacchi's departure, but later decided not to hire him, considering him to be too left-leaning in his political views. He was married to Rosanna, with whom he had a daughter, Monica.

Bagnoli died in Verona on 17 July 2026, at the age of 91, due to a neurodegenerative disease.

== Style of play ==
Bagnoli was a quick and versatile midfielder who was capable of playing in several roles, and throughout his career he was deployed as a central midfielder (in the mezzala role), as an attacking midfielder, as a right winger, and even as a defensive midfielder, or as an inside forward. In his final seasons with Verbania, he was also deployed as a sweeper. His main traits were his solid technique, tactical intelligence, ball-winning abilities, and eye for goal from midfield, courtesy of his powerful striking ability from distance.

== Style of management ==
A meticulous and tactically intelligent coach, Bagnoli usually applied the catenaccio system with his teams – in particular during his time at Verona – although he also employed zona mista tactics when defending, a cross between the man-marking and zonal marking systems; his defenders were usually required to contain their opponents in positions further away from the goal. His midfielders were often asked to press their opponents aggressively off the ball, while when in possession, he either asked his players to slow down the play and keep the ball by circulating possession, or hit his opponents quickly and suddenly on the counter-attack, making use of long balls out to his wingers and full-backs in order to stretch his opponents and create space for the forwards. He usually employed a sweeper in his teams, who was also required either to play or carry the ball out from the back after winning back possession and function as a deep-lying playmaker until his teammates were back in position; he also used an advanced playmaker behind the team's two forwards, who was in charge of implementing the side's set plays with his quick passing, as well as playing balls out to the wingers or attacking full-backs, or creating chances for the strikers. At Verona, Pietro Fanna was also required to play an important role on the wing under Bagnoli, who utilised the winger's technical skills, speed, and intelligent movement to help the team push forward quickly on the break; in this role, Fanna was also known for his ability to hold up the ball in order to create space for teammates and full-backs making overlapping attacking runs, functioning as a playmaker himself on the flank at times. Bagnoli usually attempted to field his players in a system which best suited their technical and tactical characteristics, and often felt that they should be given the freedom to express their individual skills in their most appropriate position. Furthermore, he preferred to work with a small group of players for his starting eleven, avoiding turnovers as much as possible. In spite of his friendly and reserved character, and reputation as a man of few words, he was known to be an excellent motivator and communicated well with his players, often looking to collaborate with them in implementing his ideas. Usually his teams were known for starting off slowly and then finishing seasons strongly, after Bagnoli was able to perfect his systems throughout the season through gradual modifications. Regarding Bagnoli, Italy's 1982 World Cup-winning manager Enzo Bearzot commented that he saw his own system in Verona's formation. Bagnoli's success with Verona later earned him the nickname "il mago della Bovisa" (the wizard from Bovisa).

== Honours ==
=== Player ===
Milan

- Serie A: 1956–57
- Latin Cup: 1956

=== Manager ===
Fano

- Serie C2: 1978–79

Hellas Verona

- Serie A: 1984–85
- Serie B: 1981–82

=== Individual ===
- Seminatore d'oro: 1984
- Italian Football Hall of Fame: 2017
