= 1992–93 Serie B =

Italian football league season

Serie B
- Season: 1992–93
- Champions: Reggiana; 1st title
- Promoted: Cremonese; Piacenza; Lecce
- Relegated: SPAL; Bologna; Taranto (bankruptcy); Ternana (bankruptcy)
- Matches: 380
- Goals: 749 (1.97 per match)
- Top goalscorer: (Germany) Oliver Bierhoff (20 goals)

Serie B 1992-93 team distribution

The Serie B 1992–93 was the sixty-first tournament of this competition played in Italy since its creation.

== Teams ==
SPAL, Monza, Ternana and Fidelis Andria had been promoted from Serie C, while Bari, Verona, Cremonese and Ascoli had been relegated from Serie A.

== Final classification ==
Pos	Team	Pld	W	D	L	GF	GA	GD	Pts	Promotion or relegation
1	Reggiana (P, C)	38	18	17	3	41	16	+25	53	Promotion to Serie A
2	Cremonese (P)	38	19	13	6	63	35	+28	51	Promotion to Serie A
3	Piacenza (P)	38	17	14	7	42	26	+16	48	Promotion to Serie A
3	Lecce (P)	38	15	18	5	45	38	+7	48	Promotion to Serie A
5	Padova	38	17	13	8	45	35	+10	47	
6	Ascoli	38	16	14	8	57	35	+22	46	
7	Cosenza	38	14	15	9	37	27	+10	43	
8	Pisa	38	13	14	11	25	26	−1	40	
9	Cesena	38	12	14	12	37	35	+2	38	
9	Bari	38	14	10	14	43	44	−1	38	
11	Venezia	38	11	14	13	41	41	0	36	
12	Verona	38	10	15	13	30	34	−4	35	
13	Lucchese	38	6	21	11	35	38	−3	33	
13	Monza	38	6	21	11	24	31	−7	33	
13	Modena	38	10	13	15	34	43	−9	33	
16	Fidelis Andria	38	6	20	12	27	34	−7	32	
17	S.P.A.L. (R)	38	8	15	15	30	42	−12	31	Relegation to Serie C1
18	Bologna (R)	38	9	12	17	38	55	−17	30	Relegation to Serie C1
19	Taranto (R, E, R, R)	38	6	15	17	30	51	−21	27	Relegation to Campionato Nazionale Dilettanti (Note: Taranto and Ternana went bankrupt and lost their professional status.)
20	Ternana (R, E, R)	38	4	10	24	25	63	−38	18	Relegation to Campionato Nazionale Dilettanti

Source: Head-to-head points used for three or more clubs finishing at the same result.
(C) Champions; (E) Eliminated; (P) Promoted; (R) Relegated

== Results ==
Home \ Away	ASC	BAR	BOL	CES	COS	CRE	FAN	LCE	LUC	MOD	MON	PAD	PIA	PIS	REA	SPA	TAR	TER	VEN	HEL
Ascoli		1–0	5–0	3–0	1–1	3–0	0–2	3–3	1–1	3–0	1–1	3–1	3–0	1–2	0–0	0–0	2–1	4–1	1–0	0–0
Bari	1–1		2–0	0–0	1–2	1–2	3–0	0–1	3–2	2–1	1–0	1–1	2–0	1–0	0–0	0–0	3–1	3–1	0–0	1–0
Bologna	0–2	2–3		1–0	1–0	2–2	1–1	2–3	1–3	2–1	1–1	0–1	0–1	1–1	0–0	1–2	3–0	1–0	0–0	1–1
Cesena	1–2	1–0	1–0		1–0	4–1	1–0	1–1	3–1	1–0	1–0	2–0	0–1	0–1	1–1	1–1	0–2	3–2	2–2	1–0
Cosenza	1–1	2–0	2–2	1–1		0–1	3–1	0–0	1–1	1–0	2–1	0–1	0–1	2–0	0–0	3–1	2–1	1–1	2–0	2–0
Cremonese	3–1	4–0	2–2	1–0	1–1		2–1	2–0	1–1	2–0	1–1	3–0	2–0	2–0	0–0	1–0	4–2	4–0	2–2	3–0
Fidelis Andria	1–1	0–0	1–1	1–1	0–0	0–0		2–3	1–1	0–1	1–1	0–0	0–0	0–1	1–0	1–0	2–0	0–0	4–0	0–0
Lecce	1–1	2–1	3–0	1–0	0–0	2–1	0–1		2–1	0–0	1–1	1–0	1–0	2–1	0–2	1–1	1–1	2–1	1–0	2–1
Lucchese	0–0	2–3	0–0	0–0	0–0	0–0	1–1	1–1		0–1	1–1	1–1	0–0	1–1	2–1	3–1	1–0	2–0	1–2	1–0
Modena	4–1	1–2	1–0	2–1	0–0	1–2	2–2	1–1	2–2		1–1	2–0	1–2	0–0	1–1	1–0	1–0	0–0	2–0	1–1
Monza	2–1	1–0	1–2	0–0	2–0	1–3	1–1	1–1	0–0	2–0		0–0	0–0	0–0	0–0	0–1	0–0	1–0	2–1	0–0
Padova	3–2	2–1	2–4	1–1	0–0	1–1	1–0	2–1	2–1	5–2	2–1		0–0	1–0	0–0	3–2	2–0	5–0	1–0	3–2
Piacenza	2–0	2–2	3–1	1–1	1–1	3–2	0–0	4–0	0–0	3–1	1–1	0–0		3–1	1–1	1–0	2–0	2–1	3–1	1–0
Pisa	0–1	1–0	0–1	1–0	0–1	0–0	0–0	0–0	1–0	0–0	0–0	1–0	1–0		0–1	0–0	1–1	2–0	3–2	1–1
Reggiana	0–0	2–1	4–0	1–0	2–0	2–1	2–0	0–0	2–1	1–0	2–0	1–1	1–0	1–1		3–0	1–0	2–1	2–0	0–0
SPAL	1–1	0–1	1–1	0–0	2–1	0–3	1–0	1–1	1–1	2–1	0–0	0–1	0–0	0–1	1–1		1–2	3–0	2–2	2–1
Taranto	1–4	0–0	3–2	0–3	0–2	1–1	2–2	1–1	1–1	0–0	1–0	1–0	0–1	0–0	2–2	2–0		1–1	1–1	0–0
Ternana	0–2	3–1	0–2	2–2	0–1	1–2	0–0	0–1	1–0	2–0	0–0	0–1	0–2	3–0	0–1	1–1	2–2		0–3	1–1
Venezia	0–1	5–2	1–0	3–1	2–0	1–1	1–0	1–1	1–1	1–1	2–0	1–1	0–0	0–1	0–1	1–0	1–0	3–0		0–0
Hellas Verona	1–0	1–1	1–0	1–1	0–2	1–0	3–0	3–3	1–0	0–1	2–0	0–0	2–1	0–2	1–0	1–2	1–0	2–0	1–1	

Source: Almanacco Illustrato del Calcio - La Storia 1898-2004, Panini Edizioni, Modena, September 2005
Legend: Blue = home team win; Yellow = draw; Red = away team win.

== Season tickets ==
The season ticket sales as they were before the beginning of the season:

Rank	Club	Tickets
1	Hellas Verona	8.562
2	SPAL	7.329
3	Bari	4.863
4	Bologna	4.170
5	Pisa	3.501
6	Lucchese	3.062
7	Reggiana	2.719
8	Fidelis Andria	2.596
9	Piacenza	2.403
10	Lecce	2.079
11	Venezia	1.998
12	Taranto	1.765
13	Ascoli	1.617
14	Ternana	1.559
15	Cesena	1.584
16	Padova	1.483
17	Monza	1.461
18	Cremonese	1.223
19	Modena	1.148
20	Cosenza	1.015

== Attendances ==
#	Club	Average
1	Hellas	12,160
2	Lecce	11,872
3	Bologna	11,511
4	SPAL	11,397
5	Bari	11,312
6	Reggiana	9,480
7	Padova	9,346
8	Cosenza	9,326
9	Cremonese	6,901
10	Venezia	6,010
11	Pisa	5,987
12	Cesena	5,759
13	Fidelis Andria	5,675
14	Piacenza	5,594
15	Ascoli	5,429
16	Lucchese	5,427
17	Taranto	4,910
18	Ternana	4,837
19	Modena	4,712
20	Monza	3,464

== References and sources ==
- Almanacco Illustrato del Calcio - La Storia 1898-2004, Panini Edizioni, Modena, September 2005

Specific
