= Giorgio Baldi =

Historic restaurant in Pacific Palisades (Los Angeles)

- Interactive map of Giorgio Baldi

Restaurant information
- Established: 1990; 36 years ago
- Owner: Baldi Family
- Previous owner: Giorgio Baldi
- Food type: Italian
- Location: 114 W Channel Rd., Pacific Palisades, California, 90402
- Coordinates: 34°01′42″N 118°31′07″W
- Website: giorgio-baldi.com

Giorgio Baldi is a Tuscan Italian restaurant in Pacific Palisades, California. The restaurant is famous for its celebrity clientele.

== Description ==
The establishment serves Italian cuisine, including pasta, seafood, veal, lamb and steak. It is noted for its expensiveness and celebrity clientele. The restaurant has simple decor, with a small green neon sign bearing the initials "gb" on its exterior. Its location has been described as somewhat hidden, which contributed to its popularity with celebrities.

The restaurant consists of a simply designed small dining room that fits about a dozen tables and a small terrace with additional tables. The menu offers a collection of Tuscan style homemade pastas and fresh Mediterranean seafood influenced by Giorgio's upbringing in Forte dei Marmi.

Baldi's is especially notable for its availability of shaved white truffles, which it offers in for many of its dishes.

== History ==
Giorgio Baldi was born in Forte dei Marmi, a seaside town in Tuscany, Italy. He immigrated to Los Angeles in 1985 and began working as a chef at various Italian restaurants in the city, including serving as the first chef at Il Giardino, a Tuscan spot in Beverly Hills. In 1990, Baldi opened Il Ristorante di Giorgio Baldi on Channel Rd. in the Pacific Palisades. The original name for the restaurant was Giorgio but when Bruno Vietina, one of the original partners left, the name was changed.

The restaurant quickly became popular with former patrons of Baldi's previous restaurants, including Rupert Murdoch and Eli Broad.

By the late 1990s and early 2000s, various celebrities were patrons of the restaurant, including Pierce Brosnan, Beyoncé, Jay-Z, Taylor Swift, Lady Gaga, Jeff Bezos, Justin Bieber, Cardi B, and Rihanna who reportedly bought a house in the Palisades to be closer to the restaurant.

In April 2011, Giorgio Baldi died at age 81 while vacationing in Ensenada, Mexico. After his death, his daughter Elena Baldi took over management of the restaurant.

The restaurant closed for several months in January 2025 due to the Pacific Palisades Fire but was able to reopen in March 2025. In the July 2025 issue of Vogue, the magazine featured a photo history of celebrities at the restaurant, featuring seventy photos going back to 2009, coinciding with the restaurant's 35th anniversary.
