= Roberto Tricella =

Italian footballer

Personal information
- Date of birth: 18 March 1959 (age 67)
- Place of birth: Cernusco sul Naviglio, Italy
- Height: 1.83 m (6 ft 0 in)
- Position: Defender

Senior career*
| Years | Team | Apps | (Gls) |
| 1977–1979 | Internazionale | 5 | (0) |
| 1979–1987 | Verona | 255 | (3) |
| 1987–1990 | Juventus | 80 | (2) |
| 1990–1991 | Bologna | 23 | (0) |
| Total | | 363 | (5) |

International career
| 1984–1987 | Italy | 11 | (0) |
- * Club domestic league appearances and goals

Roberto Tricella (Italian pronunciation: [roˈbɛrto triˈtʃɛlla]; born 18 March 1959) is an Italian former footballer who played as a defender. He was most frequently deployed as a sweeper throughout his career. Tricella played for Italian clubs Internazionale, Verona, Juventus, and Bologna, winning a Coppa Italia with Inter, a Serie A title with Verona, and a Coppa Italia-UEFA Cup double with Juventus. At international level, he represented the Italy national football team at the 1984 Summer Olympics, and at the 1986 FIFA World Cup.

== Club career ==
Tricella was born at Cernusco sul Naviglio, near Milan. During his club career he played for Inter (1977–79), Hellas Verona (1979–87), Juventus (1987–90), and Bologna (1990–92). With Inter, he made his Serie A debut, also winning the 1977–78 Coppa Italia. He later moved to Serie B club Hellas Verona, and during the 1984–85 Serie A season, he notably captained Osvaldo Bagnoli's Verona to an historic Serie A victory, the only league victory in the club's history. He later transferred to Juventus in 1987, as an intended replacement for Gaetano Scirea, and during his final season with the club, he briefly served as the club's captain in 1989, and was able to capture a Coppa Italia and UEFA Cup double, under manager Dino Zoff.

== International career ==
Tricella earned 11 caps for the Italy national team from 1984 to 1987, and he was included in Italy's 1986 FIFA World Cup squad under Enzo Bearzot, although he did not play in the tournament, serving as Gaetano Scirea's backup in the libero role. Under Bearzot's successor, manager Azeglio Vicini, he also received little space due to the presence of Franco Baresi on the team. He also competed for Italy at the 1984 Summer Olympics, where the team finished in fourth place after a semi-final defeat.

== Style of play ==
A tenacious but fair defender, Tricella was known for his ability to time his challenges, as well as his ability to defend opponents in one on one situations, due to his mobility. He was also capable of starting quick attacking plays after winning back possession courtesy of his tactical intelligence, range of passing, and elegance on the ball. Although he was also capable of playing as a centre-back, he was most frequently deployed as a sweeper throughout his career, and stood out for his more modern interpretation of the role, which saw him often advance with the ball and launch counter-attacks with long passes, rather than simply clearing the ball away in the mold of a more traditional sweeper.

== Honours ==
Verona

- Serie A: 1984–85
- Serie B: 1981–82

Inter Milan

- Coppa Italia: 1977–78

Juventus

- Coppa Italia: 1989–90
- UEFA Cup: 1989–90
