= Scudetto =

Decoration worn by Italian sports club

The scudetto

The scudetto (Italian: [skuˈdetto]; Italian for 'little shield') is a decoration having the colors of the flag of Italy which is sewn onto the jersey of the Italian sports clubs that won the highest level championship of their respective sport in the previous season. The scudetto was created in the 1920s to honour the winner of the national association football league (in 1929 rebranded as Serie A) and the first team to wear it was Genoa in 1924. Later, it was adopted by the teams of other sports.

The word scudetto is also used to indicate the Serie A trophy; "winning the scudetto" is a synonym of "winning Serie A".

== Origin ==
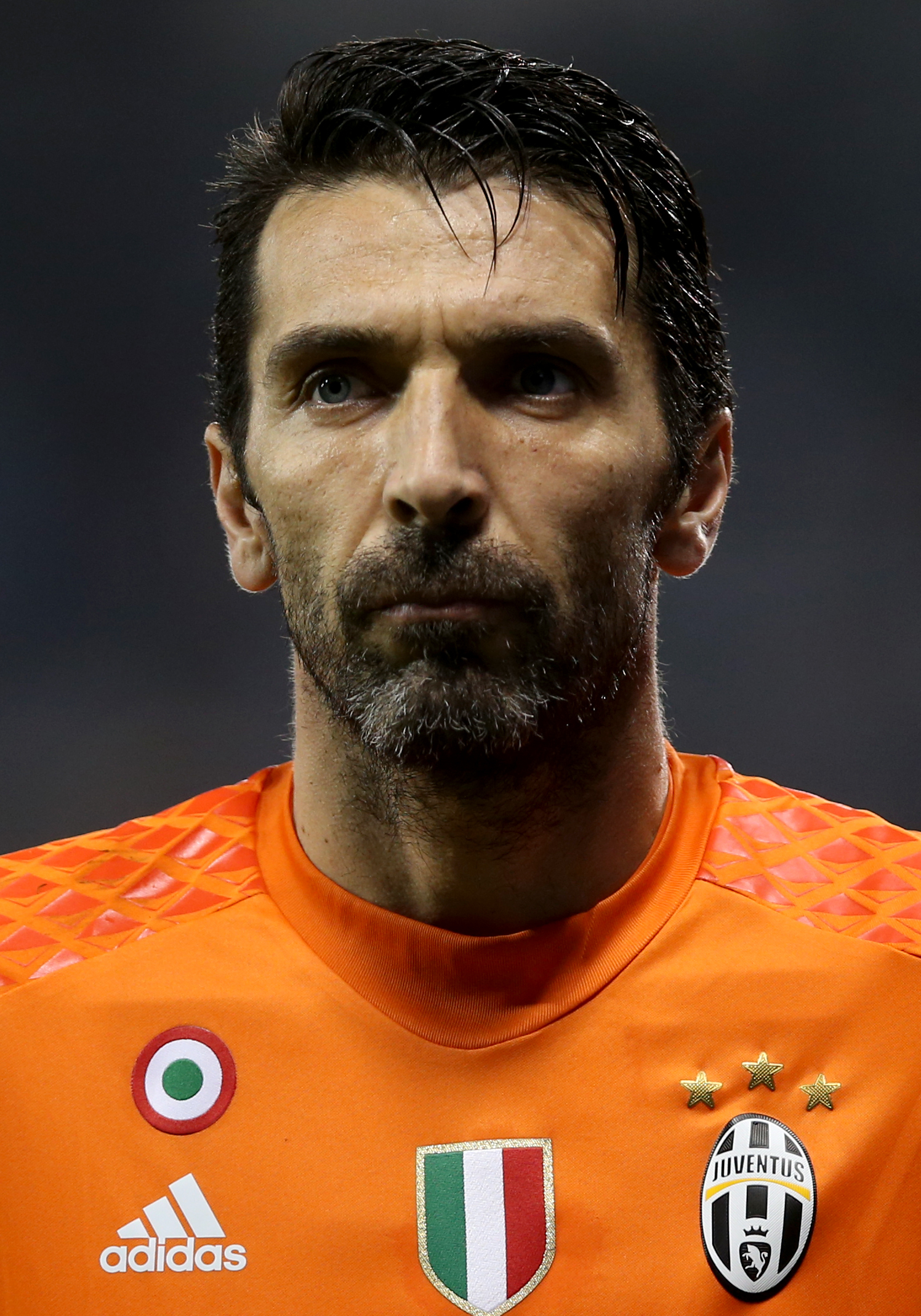
Gianluigi Buffon in 2016, wearing the scudetto won with Juventus the season prior. Also present in the image on the left is the coccarda tricolore, worn by the current holders of the Coppa Italia.

Sources generally agree that Italian poet and playwright Gabriele D'Annunzio was the inventor of the scudetto. In his youth, D'Annunzio was an avid football enthusiast. In 1887, he bought a leather football in London from the same manufacturer that supplied the Football League, and he would play often with his friends on the beaches of his hometown, Pescara.

In 1920, the former Austro-Hungarian city of Fiume (now the Croatian Rijeka) was annexed to Italy. Following this event, D'Annunzio proposed that the local football team acknowledge supporting the Italian sovereignty over the city with a tricolored shield of green, white and red on their jerseys.

In 1924, the Italian Football Federation approved the decision to honour the defending champions allowing them to wear the scudetto on their jerseys. The Italian rugby union championship which started in 1928 became the second league to adopt the scudetto on a team's jersey to indicate a title-holding team. Since then, the scudetto has become the symbol of the defending champions of every sports league in Italy.

Between 1936 and 1943, the tricolour scudetto was awarded to the Coppa Italia winner; the Serie A champion was awarded a Savoyard scudetto.

Other countries including Portugal and Turkey also have their reigning champions wear a national symbol on their chests.

== See also ==
- Crest (sports)
- Star (football badge)
- Coppa Campioni d'Italia
- FIFA Champions Badge
