= Fabio Marangon =

Italian footballer

Personal information
- Date of birth: 4 January 1962 (age 64)
- Place of birth: Quinto di Treviso, Italy
- Height: 1.74 m (5 ft 8 1/2 in)
- Position: Defender

Senior career*
Years	Team	Apps	(Gls)
1979–1980	Juventus	1	(0)
1980–1981	Prato	18	(2)
1981–1982	L.R. Vicenza	25	(0)
1982–1983	Sanremese	26	(2)
1983–1984	Alessandria	26	(1)
1984–1989	Verona	47	(0)
1987–1988	→ Sambenedettese (loan)	35	(2)
1989–1990	Triestina	2	(0)
- * Club domestic league appearances and goals

Fabio Marangon (born 4 January 1962, in Quinto di Treviso) is an Italian former professional footballer who played as a defender. He made 180 appearances in the Italian professional leagues, including 48 in Serie A while playing for Juventus and Verona.

His older brother Luciano Marangon played for the Italy national football team. To distinguish them, Luciano was referred to as Marangon I and Fabio as Marangon II.

== Honours ==
Verona

- Serie A champion: 1984–85.
