= Silvano Fontolan =

Italian footballer

Personal information
- Date of birth: 24 February 1955 (age 71)
- Place of birth: Garbagnate Milanese, Italy
- Height: 1.85 m (6 ft 1 in)
- Position: Defender

Senior career*
Years	Team	Apps	(Gls)
1974–1978	Como	115	(3)
1978–1979	Internazionale	13	(0)
1979–1983	Como	133	(4)
1982–1988	Verona	143	(4)
1988–1989	Ascoli	32	(0)

Managerial career
- Caratese
- * Club domestic league appearances and goals

Silvano Fontolan (born 24 February 1955 in Garbagnate Milanese) is an Italian former professional footballer who played as a defender. He made 277 appearances in Serie A.

== Honours ==
Verona

- Serie A champion: 1984–85
