= 1981–82 Serie B =

Italian football league season

Serie B
- Season: 1981–82
- Champions: Verona; 2nd title

Serie B 1981-82 team distribution

The Serie B 1981–82 was the fiftieth tournament of this competition played in Italy since its creation.

== Teams ==
Reggiana, Cremonese, Cavese and Sambenedettese had been promoted from Serie C, while Brescia, Perugia and Pistoiese had been relegated from Serie A.

== Final classification ==
Pos	Team	Pld	W	D	L	GF	GA	GD	Pts	Promotion or relegation
1	Verona (P, C)	38	17	14	7	49	31	+18	48	Promotion to Serie A
2	Sampdoria (P)	38	17	13	8	41	25	+16	47	Promotion to Serie A
3	Pisa (P)	38	12	23	3	47	26	+21	47	Promotion to Serie A
4	Varese	38	15	15	8	42	30	+12	45	
5	Bari	38	15	15	8	47	33	+14	45	
6	Perugia	38	16	10	12	37	26	+11	42	
7	Palermo	38	15	12	11	52	42	+10	42	
8	Sambenedettese	38	11	16	11	38	33	+5	38	
9	Catania	38	11	16	11	38	41	−3	38	
10	Cremonese	38	11	15	12	36	39	−3	37	
11	Lazio	38	11	15	12	38	35	+3	37	
12	Reggiana	38	8	21	9	31	36	−5	37	
13	Lecce	38	10	17	11	30	35	−5	37	
14	Foggia	38	11	14	13	30	37	−7	36	
15	Pistoiese	38	9	18	11	31	38	−7	36	
16	Cavese	38	11	14	13	28	35	−7	36	
17	Rimini (R)	38	11	14	13	39	45	−6	36	Relegation to Serie C1 (Note: Rimini relegated for worst head-to-head results against Foggia, Cavese and Pistoiese.)
18	Brescia (R)	38	8	15	15	27	40	−13	31	Relegation to Serie C1
19	S.P.A.L. (R)	38	6	16	16	26	43	−17	28	Relegation to Serie C1
20	Pescara (R)	38	4	9	25	20	57	−37	17	Relegation to Serie C1

Source: head-to-head points officially used in event of equal points.
(C) Champions; (P) Promoted; (R) Relegated

== Results ==
Home \ Away	BAR	BRE	CAT	CAV	CRE	FOG	LAZ	LEC	PAL	PER	PES	PSA	PST	REG	RIM	SMB	SMP	SPA	VAR	VER
Bari	—	1–0	2–1	5–0	1–1	3–0	1–0	1–0	2–0	1–0	3–1	1–1	0–1	0–1	1–0	0–0	1–2	1–0	0–0	1–1
Brescia	2–2	—	1–0	0–0	2–3	1–1	0–1	0–2	2–3	1–0	0–1	0–0	1–0	0–0	1–0	1–1	2–1	2–0	0–0	0–0
Catania	2–1	2–1	—	4–1	1–1	2–1	1–1	0–0	3–1	2–1	1–1	1–1	0–0	0–0	1–1	1–1	1–0	1–1	0–2	2–1
Cavese	0–0	0–1	0–0	—	2–1	1–1	0–0	0–0	0–0	1–0	1–0	0–0	1–1	5–1	2–0	2–1	1–1	3–1	0–0	2–1
Cremonese	1–1	0–0	1–0	1–0	—	0–1	0–0	2–1	1–1	0–0	3–1	0–0	1–1	3–0	3–1	2–0	1–2	2–0	0–0	1–5
Foggia	1–2	2–1	0–1	0–0	1–0	—	0–1	1–0	0–0	0–0	2–0	1–1	2–1	2–1	0–0	0–3	2–1	1–0	0–0	0–0
Lazio	0–1	1–1	0–1	1–0	0–1	4–1	—	4–0	0–3	1–0	1–0	2–2	0–0	0–0	1–2	1–1	0–0	1–2	3–2	2–0
Lecce	1–0	2–0	2–1	0–1	1–1	1–0	1–0	—	2–1	1–1	1–0	0–0	3–0	0–0	2–2	0–0	1–0	1–1	1–1	0–1
Palermo	3–3	2–0	0–2	2–0	2–0	2–1	3–2	1–1	—	0–2	2–0	2–2	1–1	1–1	4–1	1–0	0–0	2–1	2–0	1–0
Perugia	1–1	0–1	3–1	2–0	0–0	1–0	1–0	2–1	1–0	—	1–0	0–2	2–0	1–0	1–0	3–0	2–0	1–0	2–1	0–0
Pescara	2–0	1–0	1–1	1–1	0–2	1–1	1–2	0–0	0–5	0–2	—	1–2	1–1	0–1	2–4	0–1	0–1	2–0	1–2	0–0
Pisa	0–0	2–1	5–1	1–0	3–0	1–1	1–1	3–0	3–1	2–2	3–0	—	3–1	0–0	1–1	2–2	1–2	1–0	0–0	0–0
Pistoiese	1–1	1–0	1–1	2–1	0–0	0–0	0–1	1–1	3–1	0–0	1–0	0–0	—	2–0	2–1	1–0	0–2	1–1	1–1	4–2
Reggiana	1–0	1–1	0–0	0–2	1–1	1–1	1–1	0–0	1–1	2–1	0–0	0–1	4–0	—	1–0	1–0	1–1	1–1	2–2	0–0
Rimini	0–2	1–0	2–0	0–0	3–1	1–2	1–0	3–1	0–2	2–1	2–0	2–2	1–1	1–1	—	1–1	0–0	2–2	1–0	1–0
Samb.	1–2	1–1	0–0	1–0	3–0	2–2	0–0	1–1	0–0	1–1	4–0	0–0	1–0	3–2	3–0	—	2–2	1–0	1–0	1–2
Sampdoria	1–1	5–0	1–0	2–0	2–1	1–0	1–1	0–0	2–0	1–0	1–0	1–1	1–0	0–1	0–0	0–1	—	2–1	1–0	0–0
Spal	1–1	1–1	1–0	1–0	1–0	0–1	2–2	2–2	1–1	1–0	0–0	0–0	0–0	3–3	0–0	1–0	0–3	—	0–1	0–0
Varese	3–1	1–1	1–1	0–1	1–0	1–0	1–1	2–0	3–1	3–2	3–1	1–0	1–1	1–1	1–1	1–0	2–0	2–0	—	1–0
Verona	3–3	1–1	4–2	3–0	1–1	2–1	3–2	2–0	1–0	0–0	2–1	1–0	2–1	1–0	3–1	2–0	1–1	1–0	3–1	—

Legend: Blue = home team win; Yellow = draw; Red = away team win.

== Attendances ==
#	Club	Average
1	Bari	22,534
2	Lazio	21,634
3	Sampdoria	21,254
4	Hellas	19,273
5	Palermo	17,313
6	Pisa	15,016
7	Brescia	12,622
8	Reggiana	12,138
9	Catania	12,084
10	Perugia	11,226
11	Foggia	10,677
12	SPAL	10,518
13	Lecce	8,931
14	Pistoiese	8,672
15	Cremonese	8,233
16	Varese	8,171
17	Cavese	7,198
18	Sambenedettese	6,965
19	Rimini	6,808
20	Pescara	4,887

== References and sources ==
- Almanacco Illustrato del Calcio - La Storia 1898-2004, Panini Edizioni, Modena, September 2005
