= 1984–85 Serie A =

83rd season of top-tier Italian football

Serie A
- Season: 1984–85
- Dates: 16 September 1984 – 19 May 1985
- Champions: Hellas Verona; 1st title
- Relegated: Ascoli; Cremonese; Lazio
- European Cup: Hellas Verona; Juventus
- Cup Winners' Cup: Sampdoria
- UEFA Cup: Torino; Internazionale; Milan
- Matches: 240
- Goals: 504 (2.1 per match)
- Top goalscorer: Michel Platini (18 goals)
- Longest winning run: 4 matches Internazionale and Torino
- Longest unbeaten run: 14 matches Hellas Verona
- Longest winless run: 19 matches Cremonese
- Longest losing run: 7 matches Lazio
- All statistics correct as of 19 May 1985.

The 1984–85 Serie A season heralded Hellas Verona's first and so far only Scudetto. Unusually, none of the big three of Juventus, Milan or Internazionale managed to finish in the top two. Ascoli, Lazio and Cremonese all were relegated to Serie B. Italy had one more place from the UEFA ranking.

It was the only season when referees were assigned to matches by way of a random draw instead of being assigned to a specific match by a special commission of referees (designatori arbitrali). After the betting scandal of the early 1980s (the calcioscommesse scandal) it had been decided to clean up the image of Italian football by assigning referees randomly instead of picking them, in order to clear up all the suspicions and accusations.

== Teams ==
Atalanta, Como and Cremonese, all from Lombardy, had been promoted from Serie B.

Serie A 1984-85 team distribution

== Final classification ==
Pos	Team	Pld	W	D	L	GF	GA	GD	Pts	Qualification or relegation
1	Hellas Verona (C)	30	15	13	2	42	19	+23	43	Qualification to European Cup
2	Torino	30	14	11	5	36	22	+14	39	Qualification to UEFA Cup
3	Internazionale	30	13	12	5	42	28	+14	38	Qualification to UEFA Cup
4	Sampdoria	30	12	13	5	36	21	+15	37	Qualification to Cup Winners' Cup
5	Milan	30	12	12	6	31	25	+6	36 (Note: Position defined by head-to-head points: Milan: 3 pts; Juventus: 1 pt.)	Qualification to UEFA Cup
6	Juventus (Note: Juventus gained entry to the 1985–86 European Cup as defending champions.)	30	11	14	5	48	33	+15	36	Qualification to European Cup
7	Roma	30	10	14	6	33	25	+8	34	
8	Napoli	30	10	13	7	34	29	+5	33	
9	Fiorentina	30	8	13	9	33	31	+2	29	
10	Atalanta	30	5	18	7	20	32	−12	28	
11	Como	30	6	13	11	17	27	−10	25	
12	Udinese	30	10	5	15	43	46	−3	25	
13	Avellino	30	7	11	12	27	33	−6	25	
14	Ascoli (R)	30	4	14	12	24	40	−16	22	Relegation to Serie B
15	Lazio (R)	30	2	11	17	16	45	−29	15	Relegation to Serie B
16	Cremonese (R)	30	4	7	19	22	48	−26	15	Relegation to Serie B

Source: RSSSF.com
Rules for classification: 1) Points; 2) Head-to-head points; 3) Head-to-head goal difference; 4) Goal difference; 5) Goals scored; 6) Draw. (Note: Head-to-head record is used only after all the matches between the teams in question have been played).
(C) Champions; (R) Relegated

== Results ==
Home \ Away	ASC	ATA	AVE	COM	CRE	FIO	INT	JUV	LAZ	MIL	NAP	ROM	SAM	TOR	UDI	VER
Ascoli	—	0–0	2–2	1–0	3–2	2–1	1–1	1–1	0–0	0–1	1–1	0–0	2–0	2–2	0–1	1–3
Atalanta	0–0	—	3–3	1–0	1–0	2–2	1–1	1–1	1–0	1–0	1–0	0–0	0–0	0–0	0–1	1–1
Avellino	2–0	1–1	—	1–1	2–0	0–0	0–0	0–0	1–0	0–0	0–1	0–0	2–1	1–3	4–1	2–1
Como	1–0	0–0	2–1	—	1–0	0–0	0–0	0–0	1–0	0–0	1–1	0–0	0–0	0–0	2–0	0–0
Cremonese	2–0	0–0	0–0	2–0	—	1–1	1–2	1–3	1–1	0–1	1–1	0–5	1–1	2–1	2–0	0–2
Fiorentina	1–1	5–0	1–0	2–1	1–1	—	1–1	0–0	3–0	0–0	0–1	1–0	0–3	0–0	3–1	1–3
Internazionale	5–1	1–0	2–1	1–0	2–0	1–0	—	4–0	1–0	2–2	2–1	0–0	2–0	1–1	1–0	0–0
Juventus	2–2	5–1	2–1	2–0	5–1	1–2	3–1	—	1–0	1–1	2–0	1–1	1–1	1–2	3–2	1–1
Lazio	0–0	1–1	0–1	3–2	2–1	0–1	1–1	3–3	—	0–1	1–1	1–1	0–3	0–0	1–4	0–1
Milan	2–1	2–2	2–0	0–2	2–1	1–1	2–1	3–2	2–0	—	2–1	2–1	0–1	0–1	2–2	0–0
Napoli	1–1	1–0	0–0	3–0	1–0	1–0	3–1	0–0	4–0	0–0	—	1–2	1–1	2–1	4–3	0–0
Roma	3–1	1–1	1–0	1–1	3–2	2–1	4–3	1–1	0–0	0–1	1–1	—	1–1	1–0	2–1	0–0
Sampdoria	2–0	3–0	1–0	1–0	1–0	2–0	1–2	1–1	2–2	2–1	0–0	3–0	—	2–2	1–0	1–1
Torino	1–0	0–0	2–0	3–1	1–0	2–2	1–1	0–2	1–0	2–0	3–0	1–0	1–1	—	1–0	1–2
Udinese	1–1	2–0	2–0	4–1	2–0	2–2	2–1	0–3	5–0	1–1	2–2	0–2	1–0	0–1	—	3–5
Hellas Verona	2–0	1–1	4–2	0–0	3–0	2–1	1–1	2–0	1–0	0–0	3–1	1–0	0–0	1–2	1–0	—

Legend: Blue = home team win; Yellow = draw; Red = away team win.

== Top goalscorers ==
Rank	Player	Club	Goals
1	(France) Michel Platini	Juventus	18
2	(Italy) Alessandro Altobelli	Internazionale	17
3	(Argentina) Diego Maradona	Napoli	14
4	(Italy) Massimo Briaschi	Juventus	12
5	(Argentina) Daniel Bertoni	Napoli	11
5	(Italy) Giuseppe Galderisi	Hellas Verona	11
7	(Germany) Hans-Peter Briegel	Hellas Verona	9
7	(Italy) Aldo Serena	Torino	9
7	(Italy) Pietro Paolo Virdis	Milan	9
10	(Germany) Karl-Heinz Rummenigge	Internazionale	8
10	(Denmark) Preben Elkjær	Hellas Verona	8
10	(Italy) Roberto Pruzzo	Roma	8

== Attendances ==
#	Football club	Average attendance
1	SSC Napoli	77,597
2	AC Milan	60,941
3	Internazionale	52,572
4	AS Roma	51,421
5	Fiorentina	42,360
6	Juventus	41,271
7	Hellas Verona	40,111
8	SS Lazio	38,544
9	Torino FC	37,328
10	Udinese	35,485
11	Atalanta BC	33,647
12	Sampdoria	32,544
13	US Avellino 1912	26,407
14	Ascoli Calcio	20,165
15	Como Calcio	16,329
16	US Cremonese	15,222

== References and sources ==
- Almanacco Illustrato del Calcio - La Storia 1898-2004, Panini Edizioni, Modena, September 2005
