= 1993 Coppa Italia final =

45th Coppa Italia final
- Event: 1992–93 Coppa Italia
Torino	Roma
5	5
- Torino won on the away goals rule

First leg
Torino	Roma
3	0
- Date: 12 June 1993
- Venue: Stadio delle Alpi, Turin
- Referee: Angelo Amendolia
- Attendance: 43,732

Second leg
Roma	Torino
5	2
- Date: 19 June 1993
- Venue: Stadio Olimpico, Rome
- Referee: Carlo Sguizzato
- Attendance: 63,646

The 1993 Coppa Italia final decided the winner of the 1992–93 Coppa Italia. It was held on 19 and 19 June 1993 between Torino and Roma.
Played over two legs, it ended 5–5 on aggregate, Torino won on the away goals rule. It was Torino's fifth victory.

== First leg ==
12 June 1993
20:30

Torino	3–0	Roma
S. Benedetti 17' (o.g.); Cois 53'; D. Fortunato 78'

Stadio delle Alpi, Turin
Attendance: 43,732
Referee: Angelo Amendolia

Torino	Roma

GK	1	(Italy) Luca Marchegiani	(yellow card) 72'
RB	2	(Italy) Pasquale Bruno
CB	5	(Italy) Daniele Fortunato
CB	6	(Italy) Enrico Annoni	(yellow card) 34'	(substituted off) 46'
LB	3	(Italy) Roberto Mussi
RM	8	(Italy) Giorgio Venturin
DM	4	(Italy) Luca Fusi (c)	(yellow card) 54'
AM	10	(Belgium) Enzo Scifo
LM	7	(Italy) Gianluca Sordo		(substituted off) 77'
CF	11	(Uruguay) Carlos Aguilera
CF	9	(Italy) Andrea Silenzi
Substitutes:
MF		(Italy) Sandro Cois		(substituted on) 46'
DF		(Italy) Raffaele Sergio	(yellow card) 80'	(substituted on) 77'
Manager:
(Italy) Emiliano Mondonico

GK	1	(Italy) Patrizio Fimiani
RB	2	(Italy) Luigi Garzya
CB	5	(Brazil) Aldair		(substituted off) 64'
CB	3	(Italy) Silvano Benedetti
DM	9	(Italy) Valter Bonacina
RM	7	(Germany) Thomas Häßler
CM	4	(Italy) Fabio Petruzzi	(yellow card) 33'	(substituted off) 46'
LM	6	(Federal Republic of Yugoslavia) Siniša Mihajlović
AM	10	(Italy) Giuseppe Giannini (c)
CF	8	(Italy) Giovanni Piacentini
CF	11	(Italy) Ruggiero Rizzitelli
Substitutes:
FW		(Italy) Roberto Muzzi		(substituted on) 46'
DF		(Italy) Antonio Comi		(substituted on) 64'
Manager:
(Federal Republic of Yugoslavia) Vujadin Boškov

== Second leg ==
19 June 1993
20:30

Roma	5–2	Torino
Giannini 22', 49', 55' (pen.); Rizzitelli 47'; Mihajlović 65'		Silenzi 45', 53'

Stadio Olimpico, Rome
Attendance: 63,646
Referee: Carlo Sguizzato

Roma	Torino

GK	1	(Italy) Patrizio Fimiani
RB	2	(Italy) Luigi Garzya
CB	4	(Italy) Antonio Comi
CB	3	(Italy) Silvano Benedetti
LB	8	(Italy) Giovanni Piacentini	(yellow card) 45'	(substituted off) 90'
DM	5	(Italy) Valter Bonacina		(substituted off) 89'
RM	7	(Germany) Thomas Häßler
AM	10	(Italy) Giuseppe Giannini (c)	(yellow card) 33'
LM	6	(Federal Republic of Yugoslavia) Siniša Mihajlović
CF	9	(Italy) Andrea Carnevale
CF	11	(Italy) Ruggiero Rizzitelli
Substitutes:
FW		(Italy) Roberto Muzzi		(substituted on) 89'
MF		(Italy) Fausto Salsano		(substituted on) 90'
Manager:
(Federal Republic of Yugoslavia) Vujadin Boškov

GK	1	(Italy) Luca Marchegiani
RB	2	(Italy) Pasquale Bruno
CB	5	(Italy) Daniele Fortunato
CB	4	(Italy) Sandro Cois
LB	3	(Italy) Roberto Mussi
RM	8	(Italy) Giorgio Venturin
DM	6	(Italy) Luca Fusi (c)		(substituted off) 89'
AM	10	(Belgium) Enzo Scifo
LM	7	(Italy) Gianluca Sordo	(yellow card) 44'
CF	11	(Uruguay) Carlos Aguilera		(substituted off) 77'
CF	9	(Italy) Andrea Silenzi	(yellow card) 53'
Substitutes:
FW		(Brazil) Walter Casagrande		(substituted on) 77'
DF		(Italy) Giulio Falcone		(substituted on) 89'
Manager:
(Italy) Emiliano Mondonico

== See also ==
- 1992–93 AS Roma season
