= 1992–93 AS Roma season =

Roma
1992–93 season
- President: Giuseppe Ciarrapico (until May); Ciro Di Martino
- Manager: Vujadin Boškov
- Stadium: Stadio Olimpico
- Serie A: 10th
- Coppa Italia: Runners-up
- UEFA Cup: Quarter-finals
- Top goalscorer: League: Giuseppe Giannini (9); All: Giuseppe Giannini (16)
Home colours	Away colours

Associazione Sportiva Roma lost its position as the dominant team in Rome, due to a mediocre season. New manager Vujadin Boškov had led Sampdoria to a domestic league title and European Cup final, but his only season in the capital was hampered by too many draws and struggles to be able to outplay the opposition. The result was a tenth place, just three points clear of the drop zone, and Boškov left his job following the end of the season, when Roma also lost the Coppa Italia final to Torino. This season is also notable in the clubs history as it was the debut of academy player Francesco Totti, at age 16. Appearing on 28 March 1993 in a match against Brescia which Roma won 2-0. Totti would go on to set multiple records with the club while spending his entire twenty-five year career with Roma.

== Players ==
Note: Flags indicate national team as defined under FIFA eligibility rules; some limited exceptions apply. Players may hold more than one non-FIFA nationality.

Pos.	Nation	Player
GK	ITA	Giovanni Cervone
GK	ITA	Patrizio Fimiani
GK	ITA	Giuseppe Zinetti
DF	BRA	Aldair
DF	ITA	Silvano Benedetti
DF	ITA	Antonio Comi
DF	ITA	Luigi Garzya
DF	ITA	Fabio Petruzzi
DF	ITA	Dario Rossi
MF	ITA	Walter Bonacina
MF	ITA	Amedeo Carboni
MF	ITA	Giuseppe Giannini

Pos.	Nation	Player
MF	GER	Thomas Häßler
MF	YUG	Siniša Mihajlović
MF	ITA	Giovanni Piacentini
MF	ITA	Fausto Salsano
MF	ITA	Antonio Tempestilli
MF	ITA	Marco Caputi
FW	ITA	Claudio Caniggia
FW	ITA	Andrea Carnevale
FW	ITA	Roberto Muzzi
FW	ITA	Ruggiero Rizzitelli
FW	ITA	Francesco Totti

=== Transfers ===
In
Pos.	Name	from	Type
FW	Claudio Caniggia	Atalanta BC	(£13 million)
MF	Sinisa Mihajlovic	Crvena Zvezda	(£8.5 million )
DF	Silvano Benedetti	Torino	
DF	Fabio Petruzzi	Casertana	
MF	Francesco Statuto	Casertana	loan ended

Out
Pos.	Name	To	Type
FW	Rudi Völler	Olympique Marseille	
FW	Andrea Carnevale	Udinese	
MF	Fabrizio Di Mauro	Fiorentina	(£7 million )
DF	Marco De Marchi	Juventus	loan ended
GK	Ferro Tontini	Catania	
DF	Andrea Borsa	Carrarese	
DF	Gabriele Grossi	Lecce	
MF	Stefano Pellegrini	Udinese	
MF	Daniele Berretta	Vicenza	loan
MF	Alessio Scarchilli	Lecce	
MF	Francesco Statuto	Cosenza	loan

==== Winter ====
In
Pos.	Name	from	Type

Out
Pos.	Name	To	Type
MF	Sebastiano Nela	SSC Napoli	
MF	Dario Rossi	Ternana	loan

== Competitions ==
=== Overall ===
Competition	Started round	Final position	First match	Last match
Serie A	Matchday 1	10th	6 September 1992	6 June 1993
Coppa Italia	Second round	Runners-up	26 August 1992	19 June 1993
UEFA Cup	First round	Quarter-finals	16 September 1992	18 March 1993

Last updated: 19 June 1993

=== Serie A ===
==== League table ====
Pos	Team	Pld	W	D	L	GF	GA	GD	Pts	Qualification or relegation
8	Atalanta	34	14	8	12	42	44	−2	36	
9	Torino	34	9	17	8	38	38	0	35	Qualification to Cup Winners' Cup
10	Roma	34	8	17	9	42	39	+3	33	
11	Napoli	34	10	12	12	49	50	−1	32	
12	Foggia	34	10	12	12	39	55	−16	32	

Source: 1992–93 Serie A, RSSSF.com
Rules for classification: 1) Points; 2) Head-to-head points; 3) Head-to-head goal difference; 4) Goal difference; 5) Goals scored; 6) Draw.(Note:

==== Results summary ====
Overall								Home						Away					
Pld	W	D	L	GF	GA	GD	Pts	W	D	L	GF	GA	GD	W	D	L	GF	GA	GD
34	8	17	9	42	39	+3	41	6	7	4	27	20	+7	2	10	5	15	19	−4

Last updated: 6 June 1993.
Source: Competitive matches

==== Results by round ====
Round	1	2	3	4	5	6	7	8	9	10	11	12	13	14	15	16	17	18	19	20	21	22	23	24	25	26	27	28	29	30	31	32	33	34
Ground	H	A	H	A	A	H	A	H	A	H	A	H	A	H	A	H	A	A	H	A	H	H	A	H	A	H	A	H	A	H	A	H	A	H
Result	L	D	W	D	L	W	L	L	L	W	D	W	D	L	L	D	W	D	W	D	W	D	D	D	W	D	D	D	L	L	D	D	D	D
Position	14	15	8	7	10	8	10	13	14	13	13	11	12	14	15	16	12	12	9	9	9	10	10	10	9	9	9	10	10	11	10	10	10	10

Source: Competitive matches
A = Away; H = Home; W = Win; D = Draw; L = Loss; = Leader, 1993–94 UEFA Champions League; = 1993–94 UEFA Cup; = 1993–94 Serie B

==== Matches ====
6 September 1992 1	Roma	0–1	Pescara	Rome
		Report	Nobile 71'	Stadium: Stadio Olimpico; Referee: Maurizio Mughetti

13 September 1992 2	Genoa	0–0	Roma	Genoa
		Report		Stadium: Stadio Luigi Ferraris; Referee: Pierluigi Pairetto

20 September 1992 3	Roma	3–1	Foggia	Rome
	Caniggia 16'; Giannini 20', 58'	Report	De Vincenzo 73'	Stadium: Stadio Olimpico; Referee: Robert Anthony Boggi

27 September 1992 4	Juventus	1–1	Roma	Turin
	Möller 16'	Report	Aldair 20'	Stadium: Stadio delle Alpi; Referee: Arcangelo Pezzella

4 October 1992 5	Cagliari	1–0	Roma	Cagliari
	Pusceddu 48'	Report		Stadium: Stadio Sant'Elia; Referee: Loris Stafoggia

18 October 1992 6	Roma	4–1	Internazionale	Rome
	Benedetti 40'; Häßler 46'; Giannini 51'; Rizzitelli 65'	Report	Sammer 43'	Stadium: Stadio Olimpico; Referee: Fabio Baldas

25 October 1992 7	Napoli	2–1	Roma	Naples
	Fonseca 45'; Careca 47'	Report	Benedetti 58'	Stadium: Stadio San Paolo; Referee: Graziano Cesari

1 November 1992 8	Roma	2–3	Brescia	Rome
	Carnevale 45'; Benedetti 58'	Report	Benedetti 10' (o.g.); Saurini 14', 33'	Stadium: Stadio Olimpico; Referee: Gianni Beschin

8 November 1992 9	Fiorentina	2–1	Roma	Florence
	Iachini 30'; Orlando 33'	Report	Caniggia 70'	Stadium: Stadio Artemio Franchi; Referee: Angelo Amendolia

22 November 1992 10	Roma	2–1	Ancona	Rome
	Comi 68'; Carnevale 90'	Report	Lupo 10'	Stadium: Stadio Olimpico; Referee: Livio Bazzoli

29 November 1992 11	Lazio	1–1	Roma	Rome
	Gascoigne 86'	Report	Giannini 48'	Stadium: Stadio Olimpico; Referee: Luciano Luci

6 December 1992 12	Roma	1–0	Parma	Rome
	Rizzitelli 89'	Report		Stadium: Stadio Olimpico; Referee: Alfredo Trentalange

13 December 1992 13	Torino	0–0	Roma	Turin
		Report		Stadium: Stadio delle Alpi; Referee: Marcello Nicchi

3 January 1993 14	Roma	0–1	Milan	Rome
		Report	Gullit 29'	Stadium: Stadio Olimpico; Referee: Pierluigi Collina

10 January 1993 15	Atalanta	3–1	Roma	Bergamo
	Mihajlović 29' (o.g.); Porrini 69'; Bordin 89'	Report	Giannini 54' (pen.)	Stadium: Stadio Atleti Azzurri d'Italia; Referee: Pasquale Rodomonti

17 January 1993 16	Roma	0–0	Sampdoria	Rome
		Report		Stadium: Stadio Olimpico; Referee: Angelo Amendolia

24 January 1993 17	Udinese	1–2	Roma	Udine
	Rizzitelli 24' (o.g.)	Report	Rizzitelli 19', 31'	Stadium: Stadio Friuli; Referee: Alfredo Trentalange

31 January 1993 18	Pescara	1–1	Roma	Pescara
	Allegri 85' (pen.)	Report	Carnevale 48'	Stadium: Stadio Adriatico; Referee: Carlo Sguizzato

7 February 1993 19	Roma	3–0	Genoa	Rome
	Carnevale 28', 78'; Häßler 62'	Report		Stadium: Stadio Olimpico; Referee: Arcangelo Pezzella

14 February 1993 20	Foggia	0–0	Roma	Foggia
		Report		Stadium: Stadio Pino Zaccheria; Referee: Gianni Beschin

28 February 1993 21	Roma	2–1	Juventus	Rome
	Giannini 56'; Häßler 71'	Report	R. Baggio 28'	Stadium: Stadio Olimpico; Referee: Graziano Cesari

7 March 1993 22	Roma	1–1	Cagliari	Rome
	Giannini 27'	Report	Cappioli 57'	Stadium: Stadio Olimpico; Referee: Virginio Quartuccio

14 March 1993 23	Internazionale	1–1	Roma	Milan
	Battistini 45'	Report	Caniggia 66'	Stadium: San Siro; Referee: Piero Ceccarini

21 March 1993 24	Roma	1–1	Napoli	Rome
	Häßler 58'	Report	Fonseca 72' (pen.)	Stadium: Stadio Olimpico; Referee: Marcello Nicchi

28 March 1993 25	Brescia	0–2	Roma	Brescia
		Report	Caniggia 22'; Mihajlović 26'	Stadium: Stadio Mario Rigamonti; Referee: Robert Anthony Boggi

4 April 1993 26	Roma	1–1	Fiorentina	Rome
	Rizzitelli 6'	Report	B. Laudrup 12'	Stadium: Stadio Olimpico; Referee: Livio Bazzoli

10 April 1993 27	Ancona	1–1	Roma	Ancona
	Lupo 64'	Report	Giannini 61' (pen.)	Stadium: Stadio del Conero; Referee: Pasquale Rodomonti

18 April 1993 28	Roma	0–0	Lazio	Rome
		Report		Stadium: Stadio Olimpico; Referee: Carlo Sguizzato

25 April 1993 29	Parma	3–1	Roma	Parma
	Osio 4', 77'; Pizzi 14' (pen.)	Report	Aldair 74'	Stadium: Stadio Ennio Tardini; Referee: Fabio Baldas

9 May 1993 30	Roma	4–5	Torino	Rome
	Carnevale 23'; Muzzi 29'; Häßler 63' (pen.); Comi 83'	Report	Aguilera 16', 45', 58'; Silenzi 51'; Scifo 87' (pen.)	Stadium: Stadio Olimpico; Referee: Luciano Luci

16 May 1993 31	Milan	0–0	Roma	Milan
		Report		Stadium: San Siro; Referee: Piero Ceccarini

23 May 1993 32	Roma	2–2	Atalanta	Rome
	Giannini 19'; Rizzitelli 90'	Report	Alemão 34'; Perrone 45'	Stadium: Stadio Olimpico; Referee: Mauro Felicani

30 May 1993 33	Sampdoria	2–2	Roma	Genoa
	Invernizzi 43'; Mancini 89' (pen.)	Report	Carnevale 75'; Rizzitelli 77'	Stadium: Stadio Luigi Ferraris; Referee: Massimo Chiesa

6 June 1993 34	Roma	1–1	Udinese	Rome
	Häßler 48' (pen.)	Report	Desideri 80'	Stadium: Stadio Olimpico; Referee: Pierluigi Collina

=== Coppa Italia ===
==== Second round ====
26 August 1992 First leg	Roma	4–1	Taranto	Rome
	Mihajlović 3'; Giannini 15'; Benedetti 61'; Carnevale 88'		Lorenzo 21'	Stadium: Stadio Olimpico; Referee: Alfredo Trentalange

2 September 1992 Second leg	Taranto	1–3 (2–7 agg.)	Roma	Taranto
	Soncin 45'		Caniggia 36'; Mihajlović 53'; Salsano 90'	Stadium: Stadio Erasmo Iacovone

==== Round of 16 ====
7 October 1992 First leg	Roma	4–2	Fiorentina	Rome
	Carnevale 14', 52'; Mihajlović 46', 50'		Effenberg 79', 82' (pen.)	Stadium: Stadio Olimpico; Referee: Alfredo Trentalange

28 October 1992 Second leg	Fiorentina	1–1 (3–5 agg.)	Roma	Florence
	Batistuta 84'		Rizzitelli 69'	Stadium: Stadio Artemio Franchi; Referee: Pierluigi Pairetto

==== Quarter-finals ====
27 January 1993 First leg	Napoli	0–0	Roma	Naples
				Stadium: Stadio San Paolo; Referee: Luciano Luci

9 February 1993 Second leg	Roma	2–0 (2–0 agg.)	Napoli	Rome
	Carnevale 10'; Häßler 71' (pen.)			Stadium: Stadio Olimpico; Referee: Pierluigi Collina

==== Semi-finals ====
10 March 1993 First leg	Roma	2–0	Milan	Rome
	Muzzi 12'; Caniggia 89'			Stadium: Stadio Olimpico; Referee: Pierluigi Pairetto

30 March 1993 Second leg	Milan	1–0 (1–2 agg.)	Roma	Milan
	Eranio 37'			Stadium: San Siro; Referee: Arcangelo Pezzella

==== Final ====
12 June 1993 First leg	Torino	3–0	Roma	Turin
	Benedetti 17' (o.g.); Cois 53'; Fortunato 78'			Stadium: Stadio delle Alpi; Referee: Angelo Amendolia

19 June 1993 Second leg	Roma	5–2 (5–5a agg.)	Torino	Rome
	Giannini 22' (pen.), 49' (pen.), 55' (pen.); Rizzitelli 47'; Mihajlović 65'		Silenzi 45', 53'	Stadium: Stadio Olimpico; Referee: Carlo Sguizzato

=== UEFA Cup ===
==== First round ====
16 September 1992 First leg	Wacker Innsbruck (Austria)	1–4	(Italy) Roma	Innsbruck, Austria
20:30	Streiter (yellow card) 4'; Baur 36'	Report	Carboni (yellow card) 12'; Giannini 16', 41'; Caniggia 20'; Muzzi 71'	Stadium: Tivoli; Referee: Manuel Díaz Vega (Spain)

30 September 1992 Second leg	Roma (Italy)	1–0 (5–1 agg.)	(Austria) Wacker Innsbruck	Rome, Italy
19:00	Häßler 50'	Report	Streiter (yellow card) 50'	Stadium: Stadio Olimpico; Referee: Leif Sundell (Sweden)

==== Second round ====
21 October 1992 First leg	Roma (Italy)	3–0	(Switzerland) Grasshopper	Rome, Italy
19:00	Carnevale 18', (red card) 36'; Rizzitelli 26'; Giannini 41'; Cervone (yellow card) 87'	Report	Meier (yellow card) 37'	Stadium: Stadio Olimpico; Referee: Heinz Holzmann (Austria)

4 November 1992 Second leg	Grasshopper (Switzerland)	4–3 (4–6 agg.)	(Italy) Roma	Zürich, Switzerland
19:15	De Vicente 36' (pen.), 68'; Sutter 49'; Gämperle 57'; Zuberbühler (red card) 60'	Report	Rizzitelli 7', 90'; Caniggia 30'; Nela (yellow card) 68'; Tempestilli (yellow card) 78'; Bonacina (yellow card) 90+1'	Stadium: Hardturm; Referee: Frans van den Wijngaert (Belgium)

==== Third round ====
25 November 1992 First leg	Roma (Italy)	3–1	(Turkey) Galatasaray	Rome, Italy
18:45	Häßler (yellow card) 33'; Mihajlović (yellow card) 35'; Aldair 59', 90'; Giannini (yellow card) 67'; Carboni (red card) 76'; Muzzi 81'	Report	Bolić (yellow card) 12'; Keser (yellow card) 17'; Uğur (red card) 38'; Bülent (yellow card) 66'; Şükür 86'	Stadium: Stadio Olimpico; Referee: Bernd Heynemann (Germany)

9 December 1992 Second leg	Galatasaray (Turkey)	3–2 (4–5 agg.)	(Italy) Roma	Istanbul, Turkey
11:55	Mustafa 22', 58'; Götz (yellow card) 64'; Arif 75'	Report	Caniggia 8'; Häßler 47'	Stadium: Ali Sami Yen Stadium; Attendance: 22,868; Referee: Peter Mikkelsen (Denmark)

==== Quarter-finals ====
2 March 1993 First leg	Roma (Italy)	1–0	(Germany) Borussia Dortmund	Rome, Italy
20:30	Rizzitelli (yellow card) 8'; Piacentini (yellow card) 63'; Mihajlović 67'; Bonacina (red card) 78'	Report	Reuter (yellow card) 68'	Stadium: Stadio Olimpico; Referee: Mario van der Ende (Netherlands)

18 March 1993 Second leg	Borussia Dortmund (Germany)	2–0 (2–1 agg.)	(Italy) Roma	Dortmund, Germany
20:15	Reuter 40'; Sippel 46'; Schulz (yellow card) 55'	Report	Mihajlović (yellow card) 43'; Piacentini (yellow card) 53'; Giannini (yellow card) 81'	Stadium: Westfalenstadion; Referee: Václav Krondl (Czech Republic)

== Statistics ==
=== Players statistics ===
No.	Pos	Nat	Player	Total		Serie A		Coppa		UEFA	
No.	Pos	Nat	Player	Apps	Goals	Apps	Goals	Apps	Goals	Apps	Goals
	GK	(Italy) ITA	Giovanni Cervone	37	-42	27	-29	4	-6	6	-7
	DF	(Italy) ITA	Antonio Comi	37	2	18+6	2	8	0	5	0
	DF	(Brazil) BRA	Aldair	42	4	28	2	7	0	7	2
	DF	(Italy) ITA	Silvano Benedetti	46	4	29+1	3	10	1	6	0
	DF	(Italy) ITA	Luigi Garzya	45	0	28+1	0	9	0	7	0
	DF	(Federal Republic of Yugoslavia) YUG	Siniša Mihajlović	41	7	29	1	7	5	5	1
	MF	(Italy) ITA	Walter Bonacina	49	0	29+3	0	10	0	7	0
	MF	(Italy) ITA	Giuseppe Giannini	46	16	29	9	9	4	8	3
	MF	(Germany) GER	Thomas Häßler	42	9	26	6	9	1	7	2
	MF	(Italy) ITA	Giovanni Piacentini	45	0	29	0	8	0	8	0
	FW	(Italy) ITA	Ruggiero Rizzitelli	42	12	25+1	7	8	2	8	3
	GK	(Italy) ITA	Giuseppe Zinetti	9	-11	5+1	-7	1	-0	2	-4
	FW	(Argentina) ARG	Claudio Caniggia	25	9	15	4	6	2	4	3
	FW	(Italy) ITA	Andrea Carnevale	37	11	15+10	6	6	4	6	1
	FW	(Italy) ITA	Roberto Muzzi	35	4	12+12	1	7	1	4	2
	MF	(Italy) ITA	Fausto Salsano	37	1	9+16	0	6	1	6	0
	DF	(Italy) ITA	Amedeo Carboni	15	0	9	0	3	0	3	0
	DF	(Italy) ITA	Fabio Petruzzi	7	0	4+2	0	1	0	0	0
	MF	(Italy) ITA	Antonio Tempestilli	14	0	3+6	0	3	0	2	0
	DF	(Italy) ITA	Dario Rossi	6	0	3+2	0	1	0		
	GK	(Italy) ITA	Patrizio Fimiani	5	-8	2+1	-3	2	-5	0	-0
	FW	(Italy) ITA	Francesco Totti	2	0	0+2	0				
	MF	(Italy) ITA	Marco Caputi	0	0	0	0	0	0	0	0
	GK	(Italy) ITA	Giampaolo Di Magno	0	0	0	-0	0	-0		
	DF	(Italy) ITA	Sebastiano Nela	3	0	0	0	1	0	2	0
	MF	(Italy) ITA	Emilio Pellegrino	0	0	0	0	0	0		
	MF	(Italy) ITA	Antonino Bernardini	0	0	0	0	0	0		
	MF	(Italy) ITA	Steven Torbidoni	0	0	0	0	0	0		

- Source: http://calcio-seriea.net/presenze/1992/1044/
