= 1993–94 AS Roma season =

Roma
1993–94 season
- President: Ciro Di Martino (until November); Franco Sensi
- Manager: Carlo Mazzone
- Stadium: Stadio Olimpico
- Serie A: 7th
- Coppa Italia: Round of 16
- Top goalscorer: League: Abel Balbo (12); All: Abel Balbo (12)
Home colours	Away colours

Associazione Sportiva Roma continued to trundle in the bigger clubs' wake, being unable to challenge for any trophies, and missing out on European qualification. New president Franco Sensi had won the battle to get the vacancy against Luciano Gaucci, who departed the club in a customary fit of rage. Sensi appointed Carlo Mazzone as coach, but the defensive-minded Mazzone did not have an easy baptism at Roma, the squad drawing 15 out of 34 matches in the league, which rendered missing out on Napoli's sixth place that guaranteed the UEFA Cup by a solitary point.

== Players ==
Note: Flags indicate national team as defined under FIFA eligibility rules; some limited exceptions apply. Players may hold more than one non-FIFA nationality.

Pos.	Nation	Player
GK	ITA	Fabrizio Lorieri
GK	ITA	Giovanni Cervone
GK	ITA	Andrea Pazzagli
DF	BRA	Aldair
DF	ITA	Silvano Benedetti
DF	ITA	Andrea Borsa
DF	ITA	Antonio Comi
DF	ITA	Gianluca Festa
DF	ITA	Luigi Garzya
DF	ITA	Gabriele Grossi
DF	ITA	Marco Lanna
DF	ITA	Amedeo Carboni
MF	ITA	Daniele Berretta
MF	ITA	Walter Bonacina

Pos.	Nation	Player
MF	GER	Thomas Häßler
MF	YUG	Siniša Mihajlović
MF	ITA	Giuseppe Giannini
MF	ITA	Giovanni Piacentini
MF	ITA	Alessio Scarchilli
MF	ITA	Marco Caputi
MF	ITA	Massimiliano Cappioli
FW	ARG	Abel Balbo
FW	ARG	Claudio Caniggia
FW	ITA	Roberto Muzzi
FW	ITA	Ruggiero Rizzitelli
FW	ITA	Francesco Totti
FW	ITA	Walter Lapini

=== Transfers ===
In
Pos.	Name	from	Type
FW	Abel Balbo	Udinese Calcio	
DF	Marco Lanna	Sampdoria	
GK	Fabrizio Lorieri	Ascoli	
GK	Andrea Pazzagli	Bologna F.C.	
DF	Gabriele Grossi	Lecce	
MF	Alessio Scarchilli	Lecce	
DF	Dario Rossi	Ternana	loan ended
MF	Daniele Berretta	Vicenza Calcio	loan ended
MF	Giampiero Maini	Lecce	loan ended
MF	Francesco Statuto	Cosenza	loan ended
FW	Walter Lapini	Siena	

Out
Pos.	Name	To	Type
FW	Andrea Carnevale	Udinese Calcio	
DF	Fabio Petruzzi	Udinese Calcio	
MF	Fausto Salsano	Sampdoria	
GK	Patrizio Fimiani	Avezzano	
GK	Giuseppe Zinetti	Ascoli	
DF	Dario Rossi	Modena	
MF	Steven Torbidoni	Cagliari Calcio	
DF	Antonio Tempestilli	-	retired
MF	Giampiero Maini	Ascoli	loan
MF	Francesco Statuto	Udinese Calcio	co-ownership

==== Winter ====
In
Pos.	Name	from	Type
DF	Gianluca Festa	Internazionale	loan
MF	Massimiliano Cappioli	Cagliari Calcio	

Out
Pos.	Name	To	Type
DF	Gabriele Grossi	A.S. Bari	loan
FW	Roberto Muzzi	Pisa Calcio	loan

== Competitions ==
=== Overall ===
Competition	Started round	Final position	First match	Last match
Serie A	Matchday 1	7th	29 August 1993	1 May 1994
Coppa Italia	Second round	Round of 16	7 October 1993	16 December 1993

Last updated: 1 May 1994

=== Serie A ===
==== League table ====
Pos	Team	Pld	W	D	L	GF	GA	GD	Pts	Qualification or relegation
5	Parma	34	17	7	10	50	35	+15	41	Qualification to UEFA Cup
6	Napoli	34	12	12	10	41	35	+6	36	Qualification to UEFA Cup
7	Roma	34	10	15	9	35	30	+5	35	
8	Torino	34	11	12	11	39	37	+2	34	
9	Foggia	34	10	13	11	46	46	0	33	

Source: 1993–94 Serie A, RSSSF.com, Soccerway
Rules for classification: 1) Points; 2) Head-to-head points; 3) Head-to-head goal difference; 4) Goal difference; 5) Goals scored; 6) Draw. (Note: Head-to-head record is used only after all the matches between the teams in question have been played).

==== Results summary ====
Overall								Home						Away					
Pld	W	D	L	GF	GA	GD	Pts	W	D	L	GF	GA	GD	W	D	L	GF	GA	GD
34	10	15	9	35	30	+5	45	7	5	5	22	16	+6	3	10	4	13	14	−1

Last updated: 1 May 1994.
Source: Competitive matches

==== Results by round ====
Round	1	2	3	4	5	6	7	8	9	10	11	12	13	14	15	16	17	18	19	20	21	22	23	24	25	26	27	28	29	30	31	32	33	34
Ground	A	H	A	H	A	H	H	A	H	A	H	A	A	H	A	H	A	H	A	H	A	H	A	A	H	A	H	A	H	H	A	H	A	H
Result	L	W	D	L	L	W	L	W	D	D	D	W	D	W	L	D	D	D	D	L	D	L	D	D	L	L	D	D	W	W	W	W	D	W
Position	11	6	10	11	15	10	12	11	10	11	11	10	10	8	10	10	9	9	9	10	9	11	11	11	11	12	13	14	14	9	8	7	8	7

Source: Competitive matches
A = Away; H = Home; W = Win; D = Draw; L = Loss; = 1994–95 UEFA Champions League; = 1994–95 UEFA Cup; = 1994–95 Serie B

==== Matches ====
29 August 1993 1	Genoa	2–0	Roma	Genoa
	Lorenzini 42'; Nappi 83'	Report		Stadium: Stadio Luigi Ferraris; Referee: Fabio Baldas

5 September 1993 2	Roma	2–1	Juventus	Rome
	Balbo 34'; Muzzi 81'	Report	Möller 78'	Stadium: Stadio Olimpico; Referee: Gianni Beschin

8 September 1993 3	Udinese	0–0	Roma	Udine
		Report		Stadium: Stadio Friuli; Referee: Marcello Nicchi

12 September 1993 4	Roma	2–3	Napoli	Rome
	Rizzitelli 45'; Bonacina 54'	Report	Buso 25'; Di Canio 51'; Ferrara 67'	Stadium: Stadio Olimpico; Referee: Marcello Cardona

19 September 1993 5	Milan	2–0	Roma	Milan
	Papin 45'; Nava 70'	Report		Stadium: San Siro; Referee: Piero Ceccarini

26 September 1993 6	Roma	2–1	Atalanta	Rome
	Balbo 53'; Häßler 65'	Report	Ganz 45'	Stadium: Stadio Olimpico; Referee: Loris Stafoggia

3 October 1993 7	Roma	1–2	Cremonese	Rome
	Benedetti 49'	Report	Dezotti 30' (pen.); Tentoni 74'	Stadium: Stadio Olimpico; Referee: Virginio Quartuccio

17 October 1993 8	Sampdoria	0–1	Roma	Genoa
		Report	Balbo 44'	Stadium: Stadio Luigi Ferraris; Referee: Pierluigi Collina

24 October 1993 9	Roma	1–1	Lazio	Rome
	Piacentini 60'	Report	Di Mauro 78'	Stadium: Stadio Olimpico; Referee: Pierluigi Pairetto

31 October 1993 10	Reggiana	0–0	Roma	Reggio Emilia
		Report		Stadium: Stadio Giglio; Referee: Salvatore Racalbuto

7 November 1993 11	Roma	0–0	Foggia	Rome
		Report		Stadium: Stadio Olimpico; Referee: Luciano Luci

21 November 1993 12	Lecce	0–2	Roma	Lecce
		Report	Lanna 80'; Balbo 88'	Stadium: Stadio Via del Mare; Referee: Angelo Amendolia

28 November 1993 13	Cagliari	1–1	Roma	Cagliari
	Oliveira 37'	Report	Häßler 73'	Stadium: Stadio Sant'Elia; Referee: Robert Anthony Boggi

5 December 1993 14	Roma	2–0	Parma	Rome
	Comi 18'; Cappioli 74'	Report		Stadium: Stadio Olimpico; Referee: Fabio Baldas

12 December 1993 15	Piacenza	1–0	Roma	Piacenza
	Piovani 59'	Report		Stadium: Stadio Galleana; Referee: Marcello Nicchi

19 December 1993 16	Roma	1–1	Internazionale	Rome
	Balbo 15'	Report	Sosa 70'	Stadium: Stadio Olimpico; Referee: Pierluigi Collina

2 January 1994 17	Torino	1–1	Roma	Turin
	Carbone 64'	Report	Giannini 55' (pen.)	Stadium: Stadio delle Alpi; Referee: Graziano Cesari

9 January 1994 18	Roma	1–1	Genoa	Rome
	Cappioli 62'	Report	Skuhravý 39'	Stadium: Stadio Olimpico; Referee: Piero Ceccarini

16 January 1994 19	Juventus	0–0	Roma	Turin
		Report		Stadium: Stadio delle Alpi; Referee: Marcello Cardona

23 January 1994 20	Roma	0–2	Udinese	Rome
		Report	Pizzi 25'; Branca 38'	Stadium: Stadio Olimpico; Referee: Emilio Pellegrino

30 January 1994 21	Napoli	1–1	Roma	Naples
	Fonseca 90' (pen.)	Report	Balbo 58' (pen.)	Stadium: Stadio San Paolo; Referee: Graziano Cesari

6 February 1994 22	Roma	0–2	Milan	Rome
		Report	Massaro 11'; Maldini 77'	Stadium: Stadio Olimpico; Referee: Angelo Amendolia

13 February 1994 23	Atalanta	1–1	Roma	Bergamo
	Saurini 79'	Report	Balbo 23'	Stadium: Stadio Atleti Azzurri d'Italia; Referee: Pierluigi Pairetto

20 February 1994 24	Cremonese	1–1	Roma	Cremona
	Maspero 33' (pen.)	Report	Balbo 9'	Stadium: Stadio Giovanni Zini; Referee: Livio Bazzoli

27 February 1994 25	Roma	0–1	Sampdoria	Rome
		Report	Mancini 25'	Stadium: Stadio Olimpico; Referee: Robert Anthony Boggi

6 March 1994 26	Lazio	1–0	Roma	Rome
	Signori 6'	Report		Stadium: Stadio Olimpico; Referee: Luciano Luci

13 March 1994 27	Roma	0–0	Reggiana	Rome
		Report		Stadium: Stadio Olimpico; Referee: Pasquale Rodomonti

20 March 1994 28	Foggia	1–1	Roma	Foggia
	De Vincenzo 16'	Report	Giannini 74'	Stadium: Stadio Pino Zaccheria; Referee: Alfredo Trentalange

27 March 1994 29	Roma	3–0	Lecce	Rome
	Rizzitelli 21'; Balbo 45'; Cappioli 56'	Report		Stadium: Stadio Olimpico; Referee: Virginio Quartuccio

2 April 1994 30	Roma	2–0	Cagliari	Rome
	Rizzitelli 5'; Balbo 63'	Report		Stadium: Stadio Olimpico; Referee: Gianni Beschin

9 April 1994 31	Parma	0–2	Roma	Parma
		Report	Balbo 18'; Festa 89'	Stadium: Stadio Ennio Tardini; Referee: Fabio Baldas

17 April 1994 32	Roma	3–1	Piacenza	Rome
	Rizzitelli 22'; Carannante 26' (o.g.); Carboni 39'	Report	Iacobelli 45'	Stadium: Stadio Olimpico; Referee: Pierluigi Pairetto

23 April 1994 33	Internazionale	2–2	Roma	Milan
	Fontolan 22'; Berti 70'	Report	Giannini 14'; Cappioli 80'	Stadium: San Siro; Referee: Piero Ceccarini

1 May 1994 34	Roma	2–0	Torino	Rome
	Balbo 32'; Cappioli 64'	Report		Stadium: Stadio Olimpico; Referee: Luciano Luci

=== Coppa Italia ===
==== Second round ====
7 October 1993 First leg	Padova	1–1	Roma	Padua
	Simonetta 68'		Balbo 27'	Stadium: Stadio Euganeo; Referee: Angelo Amendolia

27 October 1993 Second leg	Roma	1–0 (2–1 agg.)	Padova	Rome
	Piacentini 28'			Stadium: Stadio Olimpico; Referee: Robert Anthony Boggi

==== Round of 16 ====
1 December 1993 First leg	Sampdoria	2–1	Roma	Genoa
	Lombardo 45'; Salsano 75'		Benedetti 2'	Stadium: Stadio Luigi Ferraris; Referee: Luciano Luci

16 December 1993 Second leg	Roma	2–1 (a.e.t.) (3–3 agg.) (6–7 p)	Sampdoria	Rome
	Cappioli 6', 51'		Platt 39' (pen.)	Stadium: Stadio Olimpico; Referee: Loris Stafoggia
	Penalties
	Comi (penalty missed); Cappioli (penalty scored); Carboni (penalty scored); Festa (penalty scored); Giannini (penalty scored); Bonacina (penalty scored); Benedetti (penalty scored); Garzya (penalty missed)		(penalty scored) Platt; (penalty missed) Gullit; (penalty scored) Evani; (penalty scored) Vierchowod; (penalty scored) Mancini; (penalty scored) Lombardo; (penalty scored) Amoruso; (penalty scored) Mannini

== Other tournaments ==
=== Carlos Menem Trophy ===
9 May 1994 Semifinals	River Plate (Argentina)	1–3	(Italy) Roma	Buenos Aires, Argentina
	Festa 62' (o.g.); Altamirano (red card) 68'; Almeyda (red card) 80'; Amato (red card) 82'	Report	Cappioli 64'; Caniggia 70'; Bonacina (red card) 85'; Carboni (red card) 88'; Scarchilli 90'	Stadium: José Amalfitani Stadium; Referee: Javier Castrilli (Argentina)

12 May 1994 Final	Independiente (Argentina)	2–1	(Italy) Roma	Mar del Plata, Argentina
	López 35', 51'	Report	Rizzitelli 28'; Giannini (red card) 40'	Stadium: Estadio José María Minella; Referee: Luis Olivetto (Argentina)

== Statistics ==
=== Players statistics ===
No.	Pos	Nat	Player	Total		Serie A		Coppa	
No.	Pos	Nat	Player	Apps	Goals	Apps	Goals	Apps	Goals
	GK	(Italy) ITA	Fabrizio Lorieri	23	-26	20	-22	3	-4
	DF	(Italy) ITA	Marco Lanna	27	1	26	1	1	0
	DF	(Italy) ITA	Luigi Garzya	28	0	20+5	0	3	0
	DF	(Federal Republic of Yugoslavia) YUG	Siniša Mihajlović	28	0	24+1	0	3	0
	DF	(Italy) ITA	Amedeo Carboni	35	1	32	1	3	0
	MF	(Italy) ITA	Giuseppe Giannini	29	3	26	3	3	0
	MF	(Germany) GER	Thomas Häßler	32	2	30	2	2	0
	MF	(Italy) ITA	Giovanni Piacentini	27	2	23+2	1	2	1
	MF	(Italy) ITA	Massimiliano Cappioli	26	7	24	5	2	2
	FW	(Argentina) ARG	Abel Balbo	32	13	29+1	12	2	1
	FW	(Italy) ITA	Ruggiero Rizzitelli	27	4	21+3	4	3	0
	GK	(Italy) ITA	Giovanni Cervone	15	-8	14	-8	1	0
	DF	(Italy) ITA	Gianluca Festa	23	1	20+1	1	2	0
	MF	(Italy) ITA	Walter Bonacina	27	1	18+6	1	3	0
	DF	(Italy) ITA	Antonio Comi	16	1	12+1	1	3	0
	DF	(Brazil) BRA	Aldair	12	0	12	0		
	MF	(Italy) ITA	Daniele Berretta	21	0	8+9	0	4	0
	MF	(Italy) ITA	Alessio Scarchilli	22	0	6+13	0	3	0
	DF	(Italy) ITA	Silvano Benedetti	18	2	5+4	1	9	1
	FW	(Italy) ITA	Francesco Totti	10	0	2+6	0	2	0
	DF	(Italy) ITA	Gabriele Grossi	5	0	2+2	0	1	0
	FW	(Italy) ITA	Roberto Muzzi	6	1	0+5	1	1	0
	DF	(Italy) ITA	Antonino Bernardini	0	0	0	0		
	DF	(Italy) ITA	Pellegrino	0	0	0	0		
	FW	(Italy) ITA	Walter Lapini	1	0	0	0	1	0
	GK	(Italy) ITA	Andrea Pazzagli	0	0	0	0		
	FW	(Argentina) ARG	Claudio Caniggia						

- Source: http://calcio-seriea.net/presenze/1993/1055/

=== Goalscorers ===
- (Argentina) Abel Balbo 12 (1)
- (Italy) Ruggiero Rizzitelli 4
- (Italy) Massimiliano Cappioli 4
