= Enzo Scifo =

Belgian footballer (born 1966)

- Scifo with Inter Milan in 1987

Personal information
- Full name: Vincenzo Daniele Scifo
- Date of birth: 19 February 1966 (age 60)
- Place of birth: La Louvière, Belgium
- Height: 1.78 m (5 ft 10 in)
- Position: Attacking midfielder

Senior career*
Years	Team	Apps	(Gls)
1983–1987	Anderlecht	119	(32)
1987–1988	Internazionale	28	(4)
1988–1989	Bordeaux	24	(7)
1989–1991	Auxerre	67	(25)
1991–1993	Torino	62	(16)
1993–1997	AS Monaco	91	(20)
1997–2000	Anderlecht	75	(14)
2000–2004	Charleroi	12	(3)
Total		478	(121)

International career
1984–1998	Belgium	84	(18)

Managerial career
- 2001–2002: Charleroi
- 2004–2006: Tubize
- 2007–2009: Mouscron
- 2012–2013: Mons
- 2015–2016: Belgium U21
- 2021: Royal Excel Mouscron
- * Club domestic league appearances and goals

Vincenzo "Enzo" Daniele Scifo (Italian pronunciation: [ˈɛntso ʃˈʃiːfo]; born 19 February 1966) is a Belgian former professional footballer who played as an attacking midfielder. He has also managed the Belgium national under-21 football team and several Belgian club sides. He played for clubs in Belgium, France and Italy, where he won several domestic titles. At international level, he was a member of the Belgium national team, for which he played in four FIFA World Cups, being one of four Belgian players ever to do so.

== Early life ==
Scifo was born in La Louvière, Wallonia, to Italian parents from Sicily. He proved himself a highly promising talent in youth football and was nicknamed "Little Pelé" at his local team, where he scored 432 goals in only four seasons as a junior. Scifo joined his local club R.A.A. Louviéroise as a seven-year-old in 1973. He transferred to Belgium's most successful club, R.S.C. Anderlecht, in 1982.

== Club career ==
Scifo made his first team debut with R.S.C. Anderlecht in 1983, at the age of 17. After winning three Belgian First Division championships with the club, and helping the team to the 1984 UEFA Cup Final, only to lose out to Tottenham on penalties, Scifo earned a reputation as one of the most promising young stars of his generation, and moved to his ancestral country for Internazionale in 1987 for a fee of 7.5 billion Lire. At the time, this was the record amount for a football transfer. After an unsuccessful spell in Inter Milan, which saw him manage only four league goals in 28 appearances, he moved to French club Bordeaux in 1988 where he again disappointed, and faced injuries and conflict with senior squad members. His career was revived by a successful move to Auxerre in 1989, at the age of 23, under manager Guy Roux, which led to a return to Italy with Torino in 1991; his second spell in Serie A was more successful, as he reached the 1992 UEFA Cup Final in his first season with Torino, and won the Coppa Italia the following season. Scifo then moved to AS Monaco in 1993, where he enjoyed a similar level of success and won the French championship in 1997. He returned to Anderlecht later that year and won his fourth Belgian league title in the 1999–2000 season. He joined Charleroi in 2000, but retired later in the same season, at the age of 36, after being diagnosed with chronic arthritis. In total, Scifo scored 121 league goals in 478 official matches.

== International career ==
Scifo with Belgium in 1984

Scifo made his senior international debut on 6 June 1984 for Belgium, in a 2–2 friendly draw against Hungary. In Belgium's opening group match of UEFA Euro 1984, on 13 June, he attracted much publicity when he helped his team to a 2–0 victory over Yugoslavia; at the age of 18 years and 115 days, he was the youngest player ever to appear in the finals at the time.

Scifo featured in all three of Belgium's group matches in the tournament, as they placed third in their group and suffered a first round elimination.

"“He’s the only European footballer who can genuinely be considered my successor."

— Michel Platini on 18-year old Scifo in 1984

He appeared for Belgium in the 1986, 1990, 1994, and 1998 World Cups, playing sixteen games in total; he is one of only 14 players to have participated in four World Cups, and one of only three Belgian players ever to do so. Scifo helped his nation to the semi-finals of the 1986 edition of the tournament in Mexico, playing in all seven of his team's matches and scoring two goals as Belgium finished the tournament in fourth place; he was named the best young player of the tournament for his performances throughout the competition. In the 1990 edition of the tournament, held in Italy, Scifo scored a notable goal from long range in Belgium's 3-1 first round victory over Uruguay, on 17 June, held in Verona; the goal was later elected as the tenth greatest FIFA World Cup goal of the Century in a 2002 poll, with 2,935 votes. Belgium were eventually eliminated in the second round against England; four years later, at U.S.A. '94, the Belgian side were once again eliminated in the second round. Scifo retired from international football after Belgium's first round elimination in the 1998 World Cup held in France; in total he gained eighty-four international caps and scored eighteen goals.

== Style of play ==
A highly creative midfielder with an eye for goal, Scifo was a classic number 10 playmaker who usually played as an attacking midfielder behind the strikers; he was also capable of playing as a central midfielder, where he functioned as a deep-lying playmaker, or as a wide midfielder along the right flank. Considered one of Belgium's greatest ever players, his primary traits as a footballer were his excellent vision, tactical intelligence, and technical skills, which allowed him to orchestrate his team's attacking moves from midfield; he was also highly regarded for his balance on the ball, and his ability to dribble with his head up, as well as his accurate shooting and passing ability with his right foot, which enabled him both to score goals or create chances for his teammates. However, despite his talent, he was also criticised by his managers at times for his poor defensive work-rate off the ball, his introverted character, and for being selfish and inefficient at times, in particular in his youth, as he attempted too many individual dribbling runs, rather than looking to provide a simpler pass to an open teammate. Throughout his career, his unique playing style drew comparisons with Gianni Rivera, Giancarlo Antognoni, and his idol Michel Platini.

== After retirement ==
Scifo tried his hand at coaching with R. Charleroi S.C., joining them for the 2000–01 season. Indifferent results led to his resignation in June 2002. He later coached Tubize between 2004 and 2006, and later became head trainer of R.E. Mouscron, another Belgian League team, in 2007. On 6 June 2009, Scifo quit Mouscron due to the club's difficult financial situation.

Scifo returned to club football with Mons between 2012 and 2013. Between 2015 and 2016, he served as the manager of the Belgium U21 national team. Scifo was appointed manager of Mouscron in 2021, but was dismissed from his position after a poor start to the season. In 2024, Enzo Scifo was appointed talent manager of RAAL La Louvière, the successor club to Louviéroise where he started as a youth player.

== Career statistics ==
=== Club ===
Appearances and goals by club, season and competition
Club	Season	League			National cup (Note: Includes Belgian Cup, Coppa Italia, Coupe de France)		League Cup (Note: Includes Belgian League Cup, Coupe de la Ligue)		Europe		Total	
Club	Season	Division	Apps	Goals	Apps	Goals	Apps	Goals	Apps	Goals	Apps	Goals
Anderlecht	1983–84	Belgian League	25	5	2	0	–		8 (Note: Appearances in UEFA Cup)	1	35	6
Anderlecht	1984–85	Belgian League	30	14	6	2	–		4	1	40	17
Anderlecht	1985–86	Belgian League	31	5	2	0	–		5 (Note: Appearances in UEFA Cup Winners' Cup)	2	38	7
Anderlecht	1986–87	Belgian League	33	8	6	0	–		5	1	44	9
Anderlecht	Total		119	32	16	2	–		22	5	157	39
Inter Milan	1987–88	Serie A	28	4	10	0	–		6	1	44	5
Girondins Bordeaux	1988–89	Division 1	24	7	0	0	–		6	1	30	8
Auxerre	1989–90	Division 1	33	11	2	0	–		11	5	46	16
Auxerre	1990–91	Division 1	34	14	3	0	0	0	–		37	14
Auxerre	Total		67	25	5	0	0	0	11	5	83	30
Torino	1991–92	Serie A	30	9	5	0	–		11	2	46	11
Torino	1992–93	Serie A	32	7	6	2	–		4	0	42	9
Torino	Total		62	16	11	2	–		15	2	88	20
Monaco	1993–94	Division 1	31	6	2	0	0	0	11 (Note: Appearances in European Champion Clubs' Cup)	2	44	8
Monaco	1994–95	Division 1	11	2	0	0	2	1	–		13	3
Monaco	1995–96	Division 1	34	7	3	3	3	0	2	0	42	10
Monaco	1996–97	Division 1	15	5	1	0	2	0	2	0	20	5
Monaco	Total		91	20	6	3	7	1	15	2	119	26
Anderlecht	1997–98	Belgian League	30	4	2	1	–		7	2	39	7
Anderlecht	1998–99	Belgian League	27	8	1	1	2	0	4	0	34	9
Anderlecht	1999–2000	Belgian League	17	2	1	0	2	1	1	0	21	3
Anderlecht	Total		74	14	4	2	4	1	12	2	94	19
Charleroi	2000–01	Belgian League	12	3	1	0	–		–		13	3
Career total			477	121	53	9	11	2	87	18	628	150

=== International ===
Appearances and goals by national team and year
National team	Year	Apps	Goals
Belgium	1984	8	1
Belgium	1985	3	1
Belgium	1986	12	3
Belgium	1987	4	0
Belgium	1988	4	0
Belgium	1989	5	0
Belgium	1990	9	2
Belgium	1991	6	3
Belgium	1992	6	1
Belgium	1993	5	4
Belgium	1994	6	0
Belgium	1995	3	2
Belgium	1996	4	0
Belgium	1997	4	0
Belgium	1998	5	1
Total		84	18

Scores and results list Belgium's goal tally first, score column indicates score after each Scifo goal.

List of international goals scored by Enzo Scifo
No.	Date	Venue	Opponent	Score	Result	Competition
1	17 October 1984	Heysel Stadium, Brussels	Albania	2–1	3–1	1986 World Cup qualifier
2	27 March 1985	Heysel Stadium, Brussels	Greece	2–0	2–0	1986 World Cup qualifier
3	8 June 1986	Nemesio Diez Stadium, Toluca	Iraq	1–0	2–1	1986 World Cup
4	15 June 1986	Estadio Nou Camp, León	Soviet Union	1–1	4–3	1986 World Cup
5	10 September 1986	Heysel Stadium, Brussels	Republic of Ireland	2–1	2–2	Euro 1988 qualifier
6	26 May 1990	Heysel Stadium, Brussels	Romania	1–0	2–2	Friendly
7	17 June 1990	Stadio Marc'Antonio Bentegodi, Verona	Uruguay	2–0	3–1	1990 World Cup
8	27 February 1991	Constant Vanden Stock Stadium, Brussels	Luxembourg	3–0	3–0	Euro 1992 qualifier
9	11 September 1991	Stade Josy Barthel, Luxembourg	Luxembourg	1–0	2–0	Euro 1992 qualifier
10	9 October 1991	Sóstói Stadion, Székesfehérvár	Hungary	2–0	2–0	Friendly
11	25 March 1992	Parc des Princes, Paris	France	2–1	3–3	Friendly
12.	13 February 1993	Makario Stadium, Nicosia	Cyprus	1–0	3–0	1994 World Cup qualifier
13	13 February 1993	Makario Stadium, Nicosia	Cyprus	2–0	3–0	1994 World Cup qualifier
14	22 May 1993	Constant Vanden Stock Stadium, Brussels	Faroe Islands	2–0	3–0	1994 World Cup qualifier
15	13 October 1993	Stadionul Steaua, Bucharest	Romania	1–2	1–2	1994 World Cup qualifier
16.	7 June 1995	Philip II Arena, Skopje	North Macedonia	2–0	5–0	Euro 1996 qualifier
17	7 June 1995	Philip II Arena, Skopje	North Macedonia	5–0	5–0	Euro 1996 qualifier
18	6 June 1998	King Baudouin Stadium, Brussels	Paraguay	1–0	1–0	Friendly

== Honours ==
Anderlecht

- Belgian First Division: 1984–85, 1985–86, 1986–87, 1999–2000
- Belgian Supercup: 1985
- Belgian League Cup: 2000
- Jules Pappaert Cup: 1983, 1985, 2000
- Bruges Matins: 1985
- Belgian Sports Team of the Year: 2000
- UEFA Cup runner-up: 1983–84

Monaco

- Division 1: 1996–97

Torino

- Coppa Italia: 1992–93
- UEFA Cup runner-up: 1991–92

Belgium

- FIFA World Cup fourth place: 1986

Individual

- Belgian Golden Shoe: 1984
- Ballon d'Or nominations: 1984, 1990, 1992, 1993
- 4 FIFA World Cup participations: 1986, 1990, 1994, 1998
- FIFA World Cup Best Young Player: 1986
- FIFA World Cup All-Star Team: 1990
- La Gazzetta dello Sport + Associated Press + Match World Cup All-Star Team: 1990
- Division 1 Foreign Player of the Year: 1990
- Belgian Professional Footballer of the Year: 1990–91
- Onze Mondial: 1993
- Platina 11 (Best Team in 50 Years Golden Shoe Winners): 2003
- The Best Golden Shoe Team Ever: 2011
- RBFA 125 Years Icons Team: 2020
- IFFHS All Time Belgium Dream Team: 2021
- Pro League Hall of Fame: 2026
