= Cervone =

Cervone is an Italian surname. Notable people with the surname include:

- Giovanni Cervone (born 1962), Italian footballer
- Anthony Cervone, part of Spike Brandt and Tony Cervone, American television animators, producers, directors and screenwriters, active 1991–present
