= Walter Casagrande =

Brazilian footballer

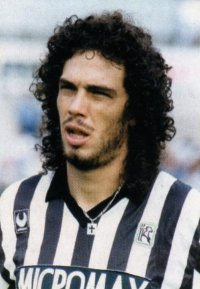
- Casagrande with Ascoli in the 1980s

Personal information
- Full name: Wálter Casagrande Jr.
- Date of birth: 15 April 1963 (age 63)
- Place of birth: São Paulo, Brazil
- Height: 1.91 m (6 ft 3 in)
- Position: Forward

Youth career
- Corinthians

Senior career*
Years	Team	Apps	(Gls)
1980–1986	Corinthians	86	(31)
1981	→ Caldense (loan)	8+	(11)
1984	→ São Paulo (loan)	–	(–)
1986–1987	FC Porto	6	(1)
1987–1991	Ascoli	96	(38)
1991–1993	Torino	47	(10)
1993	Flamengo	13	(5)
1994–1995	Corinthians	15	(3)
1995	Lousano Paulista	2	(2)
1996	São Francisco	1	(1)

International career
1985–1986	Brazil	19	(8)
- * Club domestic league appearances and goals

Wálter Casagrande Júnior (born 15 April 1963), sometimes known as just Casagrande, is a Brazilian football pundit and retired footballer, who played as a forward.

== Club career ==
During his career, which spanned from 1980 to 1996, Casagrande played for a number of clubs. He represented Corinthians, Caldense, São Paulo, Flamengo, and Paulista F.C. in Brazil, Portuguese club FC Porto, and Italian clubs Ascoli and Torino F.C. He won two São Paulo State Championships with Corinthians in 1982 and 1983, while playing alongside Sócrates, forming one of the greatest strike partnerships in the history of Brazilian football. He moved to Europe from his home country in 1986 to join Porto, winning a European Cup title in 1987 during his only season with the team. He subsequently joined Serie A side Ascoli later that year, where he remained for four seasons – three of which were in Serie A and one in Serie B – scoring 38 goals in 96 appearances, and becoming an idol with the club's fans. After the club was relegated to Serie B during the 1989–90 season, he remained with Ascoli and helped the team win promotion back to Serie A the following season, after which he left to join Torino. In his first season in Turin, he helped Torino to the 1992 UEFA Cup Final, scoring a goal in the first leg of the semi-finals against Real Madrid at the Santiago Bernabéu Stadium, as well as two more in the final; however, he was ultimately unable to prevent his side from losing to Ajax on away goals. Casagrande is also remembered by the club's fans for scoring a brace in a Turin Derby victory over rivals Juventus. In 1993, he helped the club win the Coppa Italia. In total he obtained 69 appearances during his time at the club under manager Emiliano Mondonico, scoring 19 goals. He later returned to Brazil in 1993, to play for Flamengo; that year, he was runner-up in the Supercopa Sudamericana with the club, losing in a penalty shootout to another Brazilian team, São Paulo. He subsequently went on to have a second spell with Corinthians between 1994 and 1995; in total, he played 256 games and scored 102 goals for the latter club. Finally, he played for Lousano Paulista, and later São Francisco, before ending his career in 1996.

== International career ==
With the Brazil national football team, Casagrande played in 19 matches between April 1985 and June 1986, scoring nine goals. He was left out of the team that took part at the 1982 FIFA World Cup, but he played in three games during the 1986 FIFA World Cup.

== Style of play ==
Tall and physically powerful, Casagrande usually played as a forward. Although he was capable of scoring goals, and had a consistent goalscoring rate throughout his career, he was not the most prolific forward during his time in Italy; however, he was a hard-working team player, who usually acted in more of a second striker, that is known as the "centravanti di manovra" (which literally translates to "manoeuvring centre-forward") in Italian football jargon, a precursor to the modern false-nine role, and was capable of operating across the entire front line. Although he lacked pace, he was known for his excellent technical ability, despite his large physique, as well as his ability to carry the ball. His height, strength, elevation, and heading accuracy enabled him to excel in the air, and saw him score several decisive goals from headers; he also possessed good link-up play, and was known for his ability to play the ball first time, lay it off to other players, or provide assists to teammates through knockdowns with his head or first–time passes. Moreover, his physique enabled him to hold up the ball for other players when playing with his back to goal, while his movement allowed him either to provide depth for his team or create space for teammates with his runs off the ball. As such, he was also deployed as a second striker or as a central attacking midfielder on occasion. He was also an accurate free kick taker. Furthermore, his stature, combined with his long hair and beard, made him a highly recognisable figure on the pitch. (Note: See)

== Later life ==
Following his retirement from professional football, Casagrande has worked as an analyst for Globo.

In September 2007, Casagrande was involved in a weekend traffic accident, and was briefly in a coma after his car rolled and hit parked cars. He was subsequently able to leave the intensive care unit and was breathing on his own.

After the crash he described how he had become addicted to drugs since retiring, and that he had been undergoing drug treatment for the past seven months (since September 2007). In an interview with Radio Jovem Pan, Casagrande said he has been in a private drug-treatment clinic in São Paulo since then. "When I retired, I felt a sensation of emptiness. I missed the adrenaline of the matches and practices and that led me to the compulsive use of drugs," Casagrande said, adding that he became "addicted to heroin."

Casagrande, who played for Brazil at the 1986 World Cup in Mexico, said he overdosed four times from 2005 to 2007 and once almost went into a coma after using drugs. He finished his treatment in April 2008. On 22 April 2013, Casagrande confessed on Programa do Jô that he was ashamed for doping four times while playing for Portuguese club FC Porto, during the 1986–87 season. Casagrande, suffered a heart attack on the morning of Friday on 29 May 2015. He has been sent to the ICU of TotalCor hospital in São Paulo. Casagrande underwent angioplasty, a surgical intervention to unblock arteries. The hospital did not say whether he had to have a stent put in place, a device that facilitates the flow of blood in the arteries.

Casagrande has been vocally critical of the numerous Brazilian men's footballers who endorsed Jair Bolsonaro's 2018 presidential campaign, claiming that while many footballers had endorsed Bolsonaro, no one had said why or how Bolsonaro would improve Brazil.

In 2022, Casagrande opposed the Russian invasion of Ukraine and criticized Jair Bolsonaro neutrality regarding the conflict.

== Honours ==
=== Club ===
Corinthians

- Campeonato Paulista: 1982, 1983

Porto

- European Cup: 1986–87

Torino

- UEFA Cup (runner-up): 1991–92
- Coppa Italia: 1992–93

Flamengo

- Supercopa Sudamericana (runner-up): 1993

=== Individual ===
- Campeonato Paulista top scorer: 1982 (28 goals)
- Serie B Top-Scorer: 1990–91(22 Goals)

== Publications ==
- Casagrande e Seus Demônios (Casagrande and His Demons). Globo. 2013. ISBN 9788525053800.
- Sócrates & Casagrande – Uma história de amor (Sócrates & Casagrande – A love story). Globo. 2016. ISBN 9788525061768.
