= Emiliano Mondonico =

Italian footballer (1947–2018)

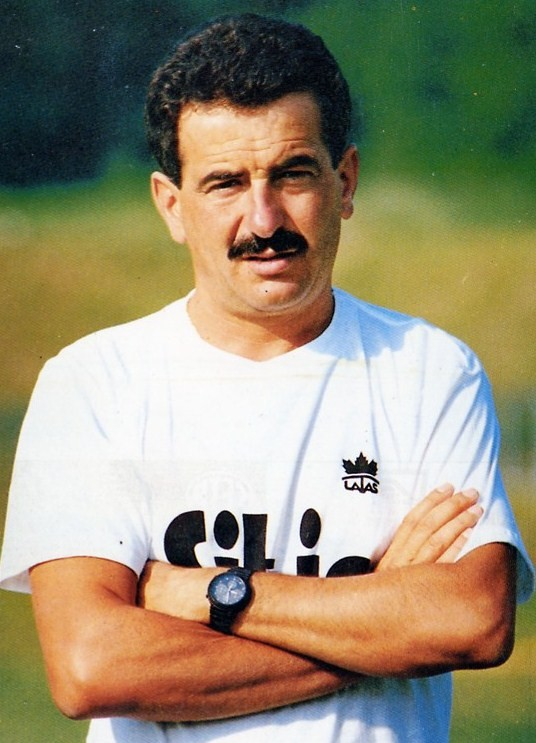
- Mondonico as manager of Atalanta in the 1990s

Personal information
- Date of birth: 9 March 1947
- Place of birth: Rivolta d'Adda, Italy
- Date of death: 29 March 2018 (aged 71)
- Place of death: Milan, Italy
- Position: Winger

Youth career
- Rivoltana

Senior career*
Years	Team	Apps	(Gls)
1966–1968	Cremonese	46	(19)
1968–1970	Torino	14	(2)
1970–1971	Monza	23	(7)
1971–1972	Atalanta	2	(0)
1972–1979	Cremonese	178	(69)
Total		263	(97)

Managerial career
- 1982–1986: Cremonese
- 1986–1987: Como
- 1987–1990: Atalanta
- 1990–1994: Torino
- 1994–1998: Atalanta
- 1998–2000: Torino
- 2000–2001: Napoli
- 2001–2003: Cosenza
- 2003–2004: Fiorentina
- 2006–2007: AlbinoLeffe
- 2007–2009: Cremonese
- 2009–2011: AlbinoLeffe
- 2012: Novara
- * Club domestic league appearances and goals

Emiliano Mondonico (9 March 1947 – 29 March 2018) was an Italian professional footballer and coach. He played as a winger.

His playing career was spent mostly with Cremonese, where it began and ended. Mondonico's 31-year-long managerial career included two spells each at Cremonese, Atalanta, Torino and AlbinoLeffe. With Torino, he reached the final of the 1991–92 UEFA Cup and won the 1992–93 Coppa Italia.

== Playing career ==
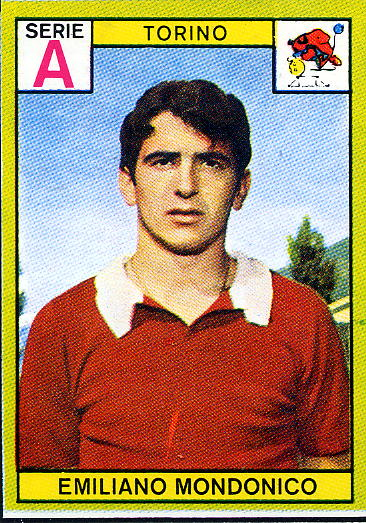
Mondonico with Torino in 1968

Mondonico grew up playing in the youth team of Rivoltana, an amateur team in his hometown of Rivolta d'Adda in the Province of Cremona. In 1966 he was signed by Cremonese, with whom he played one season in Serie D and one season in Serie C. In the 1968–69 season, he made his Serie A debut with Torino. After two seasons with the Granata, he moved to Monza in Serie B, before returning to Serie A with Atalanta in the 1971–72 season. He later returned to Cremonese where he ended his playing career after seven seasons disputed between Serie B and Serie C in 1979.

== Managerial career ==
Mondonico began his managerial career with the Cremonese youth team in 1979. In 1982, he became manager of the senior team, and in 1984, achieved a historic promotion to Serie A with Cremonese.

In 1987, he moved to Atalanta, and guided them to the semi-finals of the 1987–88 European Cup Winners' Cup.

In 1990, he joined Torino, where he won the Mitropa Cup over Pisa and finished in fifth-place in the league during the 1990–91 season. The following year, he led Torino to a historic UEFA Cup final during the 1991–92 season, lost on aggregate to AFC Ajax. After Torino were disallowed a penalty, Mondonico famously lifted up a chair into the air in a sign of protest against the referee. En route to the final, Torino also overcame Real Madrid in the semi-final. In the 1992–93 season, he won the 1993 Coppa Italia Final against Roma. The following season, Mondonico's Torino suffered a 1–0 defeat to the reigning Serie A champions Milan in the 1993 Supercoppa Italiana final.

In 1994, he returned to Atalanta for a second time, and later had a second spell with Torino as well between 1998 and 2000, before coaching Napoli during the 2000–01 season, although he was unable to help the club avoid relegation to Serie B.

After a two-year spell with Cosenza, he later joined Fiorentina in 2003, and the following year, he led the club back into Serie A for the first time since their demotion to Serie C2, following their bankruptcy in 2002; he subsequently had a stint with AlbinoLeffe in Serie B in 2006, before returning to Cremonese the following year for a third time.

In September 2009, Mondonico was appointed as head coach of AlbinoLeffe once again to replace Armando Madonna. He stepped down as head coach of AlbinoLeffe on 29 January 2011 due to "serious health issues", with his assistant Daniele Fortunato taking over on an interim basis. Two days later, his club confirmed he had undergone abdominal surgery, expecting him to recover in a few weeks time. On 15 February, after a full recovery, Mondonico officially returned to his coaching duties at AlbinoLeffe. He guided AlbinoLeffe to narrowly escape relegation after defeating Piacenza in the playoffs, but on 13 June he held an emotional press conference to announce that the illness had returned during the final period of the season and that he was seriously considering stepping down as a consequence. On 17 June 2011, Mondonico was confirmed to have resigned from AlbinoLeffe in order to focus solely on cancer treatment; he was replaced by his assistant Daniele Fortunato, who had already undertaken the first team coaching duties during his previous sick leave.

On 30 January 2012, Mondonico marked his Serie A comeback, replacing Attilio Tesser as head coach of Novara, who were last-placed in the Italian top flight and seven points shy of relegation safety after the first half of the season. On 6 March 2012 he was sacked.

== Style of management ==
Mondonico was a pragmatic coach, who used a counter-attacking style based on obtaining results rather than ball possession; he was a proponent of the gioco all'italiana or zona mista style, which was inspired by catenaccio, but which blended elements of man-to-man and zonal marking systems. He was known for his balanced approach in attack and defence, with his teams often defending deep behind the ball and attacking collectively. Moreover, his teams were known for their tenacity and work-rate. He also stood out for his ability to express his tactical ideas in a simple manner. His attacking play was based on the mobility of his teams' forwards. His favoured formations were the 4–4–2 and the 5–3–2 or 3–5–2, although he also used the 3–4–3; he even used the 4–2–3–1 and the 4–3–3 on occasion throughout his career. During his successful spell at Torino, he also used a 3–4–2–1 formation, with a sweeper, two man-marking centre-backs, and wing-backs in lieu of wide midfielders. On rare occasions, he also used a 4–2–3–1 formation in his later career. During his time as Torino's head coach, he also used Brazilian centre-forward Walter Casagrande in a role known as the "centravanti di manovra" (which literally translates to "manoeuvring centre-forward") in Italian football jargon, a precursor to the modern false-nine role, in which he was seemingly positioned as a lone striker, but dropped deep to help his team and be involved in the build-up, rather than looking to score goals. His style of coaching contrasted with that of the more offensive–minded Arrigo Sacchi and Zdeněk Zeman, who also coached in Italy during his career.

== Death ==
Mondonico died at the age of 71 on 29 March 2018, from stomach cancer.

== Honours ==
=== Manager ===
Torino

- Mitropa Cup: 1991
- Coppa Italia: 1992–93

=== Individual ===
- Torino FC Hall of Fame: 2018

== Bibliography ==
- Elio Corbani; Pietro Serina (2007). Sesaab (ed.). Cent'anni di Atalanta (in Italian). Bergamo. ISBN 978-88-903088-0-2.
