= Walter Lapini =

Italian footballer

Personal information
- Date of birth: 3 April 1974
- Place of birth: Italy
- Position(s): Forward

Senior career*
Years	Team	Apps	(Gls)
-1992/93	A.C.N. Siena 1904		
1993/1994	A.S. Roma	0	(0)
1994/1995	A.C.N. Siena 1904		
1995/1996	A.C. ChievoVerona	8	(0)
1996/1997	A.S.G. Nocerina		
1997/1998	S.S. Chieti Calcio		
1998/99-1999/00	U.S. Città di Pontedera		
- *Club domestic league appearances and goals

Walter Lapini (born 3 April 1974 in Italy) is an Italian retired footballer.

== Career ==
On the 16th of December 1993, in a 1-0 Coppa Italia win against Sampdoria, Lapini came on as a substitute for future A.S. Roma legend Francesco Totti, who was making his first start.

At the age of 26, he retired due to injury.
