= Patrizio Fimiani =

Italian footballer

Personal information
- Date of birth: 3 January 1973 (age 53)
- Place of birth: Viterbo, Italy
- Height: 1.81 m (5 ft 11 1/2 in)
- Position: Goalkeeper

Senior career*
Years	Team	Apps	(Gls)
1992–1993	Roma	3	(0)
1993–1994	Avezzano	30	(0)
1994–1995	Castel di Sangro	31	(0)
1995–1997	Catania	51	(0)
1997–2000	Viterbese	82	(0)
2000	Lodigiani	9	(0)
2000	Juve Stabia	1	(0)
2001	Benevento	2	(0)
2001–2004	Latina	90	(0)
2004–2009	Viterbese	122	(0)
- * Club domestic league appearances and goals

Patrizio Fimiani (born 3 January 1973 in Viterbo) is a retired Italian professional football player who played as a goalkeeper.

== Career ==
Fimiani made his professional debut during the 1992–93 season with A.S. Roma, where he was the team's third-choice goalkeeper, after Giovanni Cervone and Giuseppe Zinetti. After the semi-final game of the Italian Cup against A.C. Milan, Cervone and Zinetti fought in the locker room. Both were disqualified for the finals and Fimiani had to play in both legs of the finals matchup against Torino F.C. Roma lost on away-goals rule (0–3 in Turin and 5–2 in Rome). That was the highlight of his career as he never played on a level higher than third-tier Serie C1 after that season.
