= Thomas Häßler =

German footballer (born 1966)

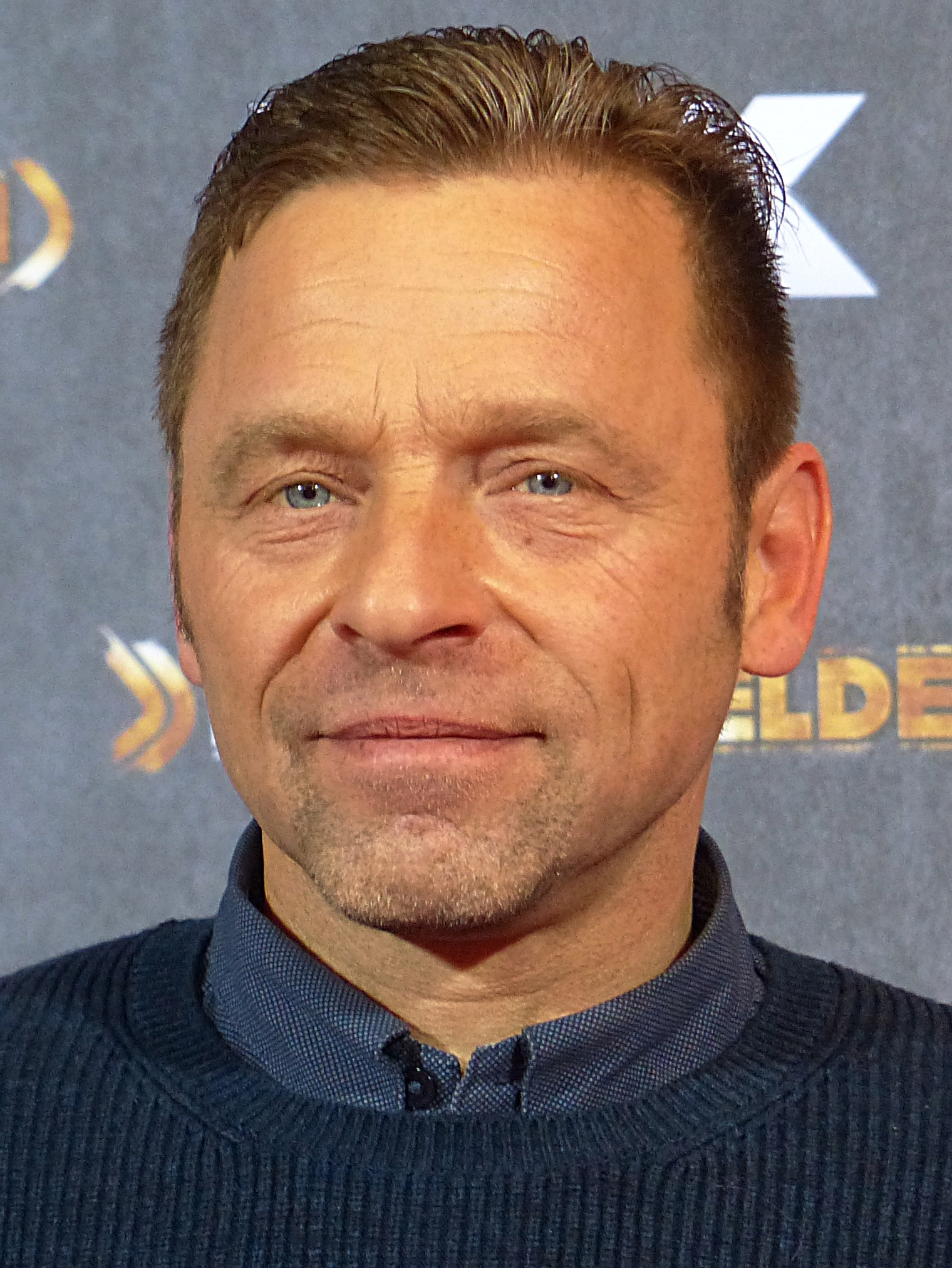
- Häßler in 2015

Personal information
- Full name: Thomas Jürgen Häßler
- Date of birth: 30 May 1966 (age 60)
- Place of birth: West Berlin, West Germany
- Height: 1.66 m (5 ft 5 in)
- Position: Attacking midfielder

Youth career
- 1976–1979: BFC Meteor 06
- 1979–1984: Reinickendorfer Füchse

Senior career*
| Years | Team | Apps | (Gls) |
| 1984–1990 | 1. FC Köln | 149 | (17) |
| 1990–1991 | Juventus | 32 | (1) |
| 1991–1994 | Roma | 88 | (11) |
| 1994–1998 | Karlsruher SC | 118 | (28) |
| 1998–1999 | Borussia Dortmund | 18 | (2) |
| 1999–2003 | 1860 Munich | 115 | (21) |
| 2003–2004 | SV Salzburg | 19 | (1) |
| Total | | 539 | (81) |

International career
| 1987–1988 | West Germany Olympic | 11 | (0) |
| 1988–2000 | West Germany/Germany | 101 | (11) |

Managerial career
- 2007–2008: Nigeria (assistant)
- 2008–2010: 1. FC Köln (assistant)
- 2014–2015: Padideh (assistant)
- 2016–2019: Berlin United
- 2019–: BFC Preussen
Medal record
Representing Germany
| Bronze medal – third place | Olympics | 1988 |
| Winner | FIFA World Cup | 1990 |
| Runner-up | European Championship | 1992 |
| Winner | European Championship | 1996 |
1. FC Köln
| Runner-up | UEFA Cup | 1986 |
Juventus
| Runner-up | Supercoppa Italiana | 1990 |
AS Roma
| Runner-up | Coppa Italia | 1993 |
Karlsruher SC
| Runner-up | DFB-Pokal | 1996 |
- * Club domestic league appearances and goals

Thomas Jürgen "Icke" Häßler (German pronunciation: [ˈtoːmas ˈhɛslɐ]; born 30 May 1966) is a German former professional footballer who played as an attacking midfielder. At club level, he made a century of appearances for four teams: 1. FC Köln, Karlsruher SC and 1860 Munich in Germany and Roma in Italy, and spent a season apiece with Juventus, Borussia Dortmund and SV Salzburg. Häßler also appeared over 100 times for the Germany national team.

He was a member of the teams which won the 1990 FIFA World Cup (as West Germany) and UEFA Euro 1996. He also appeared at the 1994 and 1998 FIFA World Cups, the 1992 and 2000 UEFA European Championships, and the 1988 Olympic Games.

== Club career ==
=== 1. FC Köln (1984–1990) ===
Born in West Berlin, Häßler spent his early playing days in youth teams of BFC Meteor 06 and Reinickendorfer Füchse, respectively. He began his professional career in 1984 with 1. FC Köln of the Bundesliga, for whom he played six successful years, helping the club to become Bundesliga runners-up in 1989 and 1990.

=== Juventus (1990–1991), Roma (1991–1994) ===
Soon after winning the 1990 World Cup with the Germany national team in Italy, Häßler transferred to Juventus for a sum of DM15 million. He spent only one year in Turin before he decided to join another Italian club, A.S. Roma, for a fee of DM14 million. This time he stayed for three years, making 88 appearances and scoring 11 goals.

=== Karlsruher SC (1994–1998) ===
In 1994, however, Häßler wanted to return to the Bundesliga. Despite offers from some of the biggest German clubs, he decided to sign with Karlsruher SC in a DM7 million deal, the highest transfer sum the club has ever spent. In the following three years, Karlsruhe and its new key player achieved positions in the upper third of the table which resulted in UEFA Cup participations in 1996–97 and 1997–98.

By winning the UEFA Intertoto Cup in 1996, Karlsruhe not only qualified for the UEFA Cup but also accomplished to throw out Häßler's former club AS Roma in the second round of the tournament. In the first leg of the third round, Häßler scored twice in his team's 3–1 win over Brøndby IF in Copenhagen. However, shortly after this win Häßler received the first big injury in his career when he broke his leg in a league match against Fortuna Düsseldorf. Without its captain, Karlsruhe played a catastrophic second leg and was eliminated from the tournament after a 0–5 home defeat. Following his recovery, Häßler returned for the last two games of the season and helped his team to finish in sixth place in the 1996–97 season, securing another year of international football competition. In the end, once again the club failed to survive the third round.

At the end of the 1997–98 season, the club's situation had worsened significantly. For the first time in his career, Häßler was confronted with a possible relegation. Feeling the pressure he once more showed his extraordinary skills and scored four goals in the last three games of the season. Despite Häßler's performances, Karlsruhe lost its last match in a dramatic season final and was relegated from the Bundesliga.

=== Borussia Dortmund (1998–1999) ===
Due to a contract clause, Häßler could leave Karlsruhe immediately on a free transfer. He decided to join Borussia Dortmund, which had won the UEFA Champions League in 1997. There he met the later assistant of the Germany national team, Michael Skibbe, then with 32 years the youngest head coach in the history of the Bundesliga. In the course of the season, there were some serious disputes between Häßler and Skibbe because the latter entrusted the midfield leadership to Andreas Möller. In the end, Häßler made only 18 appearances and never played over the full 90 minutes.

=== 1860 Munich (1999–2003) ===
Disappointed about his season in Dortmund, Häßler left the club towards Bavaria and signed a contract with TSV 1860 Munich. He spent four very successful years in Munich and became an important part of the team. Already in his first season the club reached a sensational fourth place in the Bundesliga. After they failed to win against Leeds United in the qualification for the UEFA Champions League, Häßler and his team participated in the UEFA Cup. But also with 1860 Munich he failed to overcome the competition's third round. In the following two years, the club took part in the UEFA Intertoto Cup but didn't manage to succeed. He made his 400th and final Bundesliga appearance in a 4–2 home defeat against Bochum on 24 May 2003. After the 2002–03 season, Häßler left Munich to finish his career in Austria.

=== SV Salzburg (2003–2004) ===
In 2003, Häßler signed a one-year contract with the Austrian club SV Salzburg. He made 19 appearances and reached a seventh place in the 2003–04 season before he announced his retirement.

Overall, Häßler chalked up an entertaining 539 games and a total of 81 goals throughout a football career in which he was voted Footballer of the Year (Germany) in 1989 and 1992. Although he is considered one of the best German footballers of all time, he did not win a single major club title, having lost the UEFA Cup final with 1. FC Köln in 1986, the Coppa Italia final with AS Roma in 1993 and the DFB-Pokal final with Karlsruhe in 1996.

== International career ==
For Germany, Häßler was capped 101 times between 1988 and 2000, scoring 11 goals. Other than the two major tournament wins at the 1990 FIFA World Cup and the 1996 UEFA European Championship, he also played for his country at the 1994 and 1998 FIFA World Cups, Euro 92, and Euro 2000.

In addition to his international titles at senior level, he also won a bronze medal for West Germany at the 1988 Summer Olympics in Seoul, making his senior debut later that year in 4–0 win over Finland in a World Cup qualifying match on 31 August; he scored his first international goal in a 2–1 win against Wales on 15 November 1989, once again in a World Cup qualifier, in West Germany's final group match, which sealed their place at the World Cup.

Häßler was one of the dominant figures of Euro 92, being voted the outstanding player of the tournament, and also being named to the UEFA European Championship Team of the Tournament for his performances. He displayed a specialty for scoring spectacular free kicks, tireless stamina and dazzling dribbling sprees, as Germany went on to reach the final of the tournament, losing out 2–0 to Denmark. He scored two goals throughout the tournament, both from direct free kicks, the first coming in a 1–1 draw in their opening group match against CIS on 12 June, and his second coming in a 3–2 win over hosts Sweden in the semi-finals on 21 June. He also set-up Jürgen Klinsmann's goal from a corner in a 3–1 defeat to the Netherlands, in the team's final group match on 18 June.

At the 1994 World Cup, he was the top assist provider of the tournament, with five assists, as Germany reached the quarter-finals, losing 2–1 to Bulgaria.

At the 1998 World Cup, he set-up Oliver Bierhoff's opening goal with a cross in a 2–0 win over Iran in Germany's final group match; Germany were once again eliminated in the quarter-finals, following a 3–0 loss to Croatia.

At the age of 34, he was a surprise inclusion in Germany's Euro 2000 squad, after a positive club season. He made his final international appearance in Germany's final group match of the tournament against Portugal on 20 June. Häßler came on as a substitute in the 3–0 defeat, which saw him equal the record for most appearances at the European Championships at the time (13); the result saw Germany eliminated in the first round of the tournament.

== Style of play ==
A world-class playmaker, who was considered to be one of the best midfielders and German players of the 1990s, Häßler was a talented, dynamic, and creative midfielder, with quick feet and a good right foot, who stood out for his speed, energy, and constant movement across the pitch. A diminutive player, despite not being particularly physically gifted, he was known for his technique and dribbling skills, as well as his ability to score goals or provide assists for teammates, courtesy of his crossing ability; he was also a free kick specialist, and stood out for his leadership throughout his career. He usually played as an offensive-minded central midfielder – known as the mezzala position, in Italy, although he was also capable of playing as a right winger, or even as a number 10, in either an attacking midfield role behind the forwards or as a second striker, a position in which he was tasked with playing between the lines and linking up the midfield with the attack; he was also used in a creative, holding midfield role on occasion. During his time in Italy, he was nicknamed "Tommasino" and "Pollicino" (Hop-o'-My-Thumb, in Italian), due to his short stature, while he was instead nicknamed "Icke" in Germany for his pronunciation of "Ich" (German for "I") in typical Berlin dialect.

== Coaching career ==
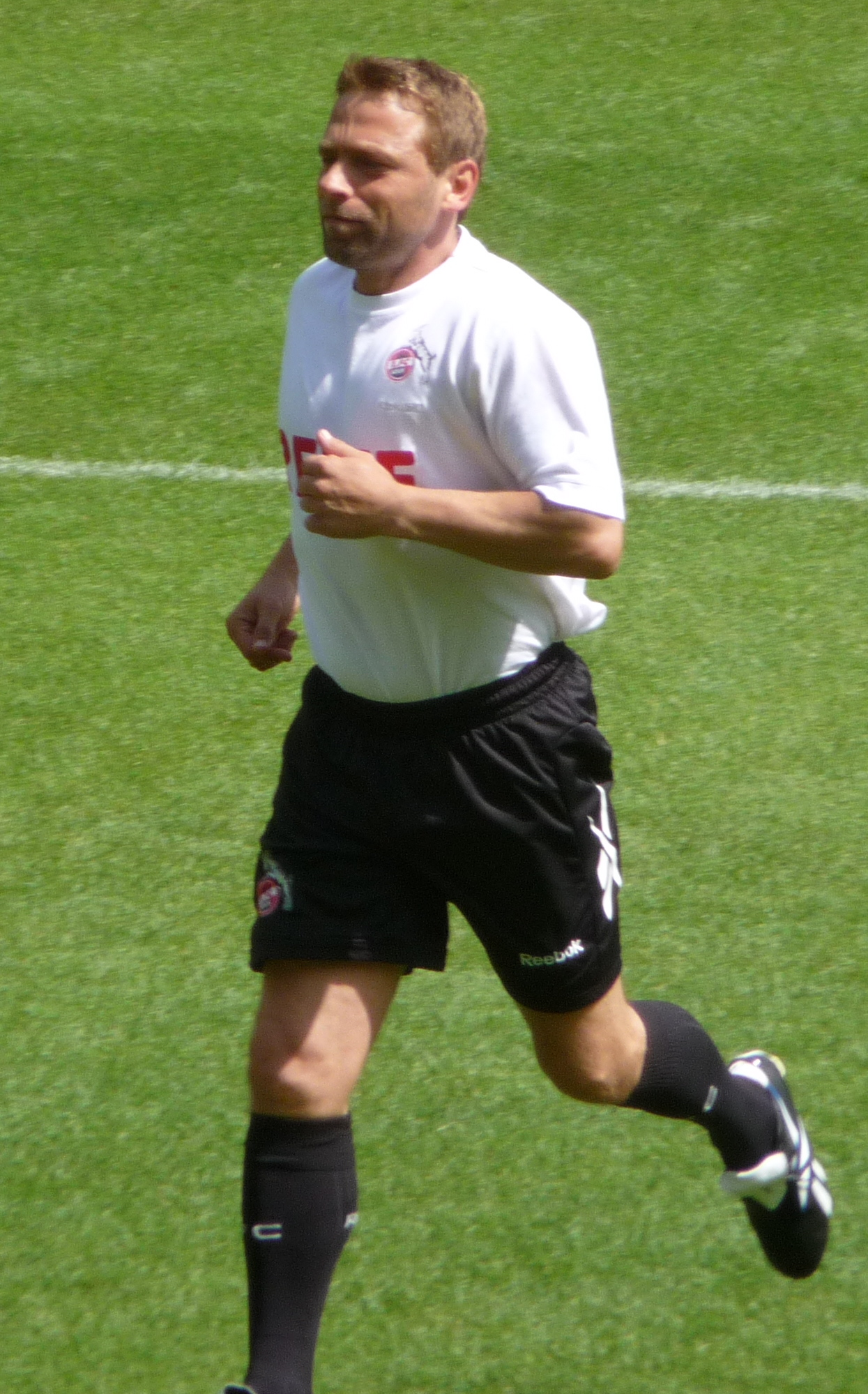
Häßler as an assistant coach for Köln, 2008

Häßler was an assistant coach at 1. FC Köln. He previously served as an assistant coach to Berti Vogts when he was head coach of Nigeria but both were later sacked by the Nigerian FA.

Häßler interviewed for the managerial position at Scottish Premier League club Kilmarnock in June 2010. On 24 May 2014, he was named as the assistant coach of newly Iran Pro League promoted club, Padideh. He will work with his long-time friend, Alireza Marzban.

In February 2016 Häßler joined eighth division Bezirksliga side Club Italia Berlin as their new coach with the self-declared aim of eventual promotion to the 3. Liga.

== Trivia ==
Häßler founded the music label MTM Music in March 1996. He participated in the 2016 season of German dance show Let's Dance. In 2017, Häßler participated in German television show Ich bin ein Star – Holt mich hier raus!.

== Career statistics ==
=== Club ===
Appearances and goals by club, season and competition
| Club | Season | League | | | Cup | | Continental (Note: Includes UEFA Intertoto Cup, UEFA Cup, UEFA Cup Winner's Cup, UEFA Champions League qualification.) | | Other | | Total | |
| Club | Season | Division | Apps | Goals | Apps | Goals | Apps | Goals | Apps | Goals | Apps | Goals |
|---|---|---|---|---|---|---|---|---|---|---|---|---|
| 1. FC Köln | 1984–85 | Bundesliga | 6 | 0 | 0 | 0 | 1 | 0 | – | | 7 | 0 |
| 1. FC Köln | 1985–86 | Bundesliga | 21 | 0 | 0 | 0 | 7 | 0 | – | | 28 | 0 |
| 1. FC Köln | 1986–87 | Bundesliga | 21 | 1 | 2 | 0 | – | | – | | 23 | 1 |
| 1. FC Köln | 1987–88 | Bundesliga | 34 | 5 | 2 | 0 | – | | – | | 36 | 5 |
| 1. FC Köln | 1988–89 | Bundesliga | 33 | 5 | 2 | 1 | 6 | 0 | – | | 41 | 6 |
| 1. FC Köln | 1989–90 | Bundesliga | 34 | 6 | 3 | 0 | 10 | 0 | – | | 47 | 6 |
| 1. FC Köln | Total | | 149 | 17 | 9 | 1 | 24 | 0 | 0 | 0 | 182 | 18 |
| Juventus | 1990–91 | Serie A | 32 | 1 | 4 | 1 | 8 | 1 | 1 | 0 | 45 | 3 |
| Roma | 1991–92 | Serie A | 32 | 3 | 5 | 0 | 6 | 0 | 1 | 0 | 44 | 3 |
| Roma | 1992–93 | Serie A | 26 | 6 | 9 | 1 | 7 | 2 | – | | 42 | 9 |
| Roma | 1993–94 | Serie A | 30 | 2 | 2 | 0 | – | | – | | 32 | 2 |
| Roma | Total | | 88 | 11 | 16 | 1 | 13 | 2 | 1 | 0 | 118 | 14 |
| Karlsruher SC | 1994–95 | Bundesliga | 33 | 3 | 4 | 1 | – | | – | | 37 | 4 |
| Karlsruher SC | 1995–96 | Bundesliga | 34 | 8 | 6 | 4 | 6 | 2 | – | | 46 | 14 |
| Karlsruher SC | 1996–97 | Bundesliga | 17 | 5 | 4 | 1 | 9 | 4 | – | | 30 | 10 |
| Karlsruher SC | 1997–98 | Bundesliga | 34 | 12 | 2 | 1 | 6 | 3 | 2 | 0 | 44 | 16 |
| Karlsruher SC | Total | | 118 | 28 | 16 | 8 | 21 | 9 | 2 | 0 | 157 | 44 |
| Borussia Dortmund | 1998–99 | Bundesliga | 18 | 2 | 1 | 1 | – | | – | | 19 | 3 |
| 1860 Munich | 1999–00 | Bundesliga | 33 | 8 | 2 | 0 | – | | – | | 35 | 8 |
| 1860 Munich | 2000–01 | Bundesliga | 32 | 7 | 3 | 0 | 8 | 1 | 1 | 0 | 44 | 8 |
| 1860 Munich | 2001–02 | Bundesliga | 29 | 6 | 3 | 1 | 6 | 2 | – | | 38 | 9 |
| 1860 Munich | 2002–03 | Bundesliga | 21 | 0 | 3 | 1 | 0 | 0 | – | | 24 | 1 |
| 1860 Munich | Total | | 115 | 21 | 11 | 2 | 14 | 3 | 1 | 0 | 141 | 26 |
| SV Salzburg | 2003–04 | Austrian Bundesliga | 19 | 1 | 0 | 0 | 2 | 1 | – | | 21 | 2 |
| Career total | | | 539 | 81 | 57 | 13 | 83 | 16 | 5 | 0 | 685 | 110 |

=== International ===
Appearances and goals by national team and year
| National team | Year | Apps | Goals |
|---|---|---|---|
| Germany | 1988 | 2 | 0 |
| Germany | 1989 | 6 | 1 |
| Germany | 1990 | 12 | 0 |
| Germany | 1991 | 5 | 1 |
| Germany | 1992 | 13 | 4 |
| Germany | 1993 | 7 | 0 |
| Germany | 1994 | 14 | 0 |
| Germany | 1995 | 10 | 2 |
| Germany | 1996 | 14 | 2 |
| Germany | 1997 | 5 | 1 |
| Germany | 1998 | 9 | 0 |
| Germany | 1999 | 0 | 0 |
| Germany | 2000 | 4 | 0 |
| Total | | 101 | 11 |

Scores and results list Germany's goal tally first, score column indicates score after each Häßler goal.

List of international goals scored by Thomas Häßler
| No. | Date | Venue | Opponent | Score | Result | Competition |
|---|---|---|---|---|---|---|
| 1 | 15 November 1989 | Müngersdorfer Stadion, Cologne, West Germany | Wales | 2–1 | 2–1 | FIFA World Cup 1990 qualifying |
| 2 | 18 December 1991 | Ulrich-Haberland-Stadion, Leverkusen, Germany | Luxembourg | 4–0 | 4–0 | UEFA Euro 1992 qualifying |
| 3 | 22 April 1992 | Stadion Eden, Prague, Czechoslovakia | Czechoslovakia | 1–0 | 1–1 | Friendly |
| 4 | 12 June 1992 | Idrottsparken, Norrköping, Sweden | CIS | 1–1 | 1–1 | UEFA Euro 1992 |
| 5 | 21 June 1992 | Råsunda Stadium, Stockholm, Sweden | Sweden | 1–0 | 3–2 | UEFA Euro 1992 |
| 6 | 20 December 1992 | Estadio Centenario, Montevideo, Uruguay | Uruguay | 3–0 | 4–1 | Friendly |
| 7 | 23 June 1995 | Wankdorf Stadium, Bern, Switzerland | Switzerland | 1–0 | 2–1 | Friendly |
| 8 | 15 November 1995 | Olympic Stadium, Berlin, Germany | Bulgaria | 2–1 | 3–1 | UEFA Euro 1996 qualifying |
| 9 | 9 October 1996 | Hrazdan Stadium, Yerevan, Armenia | Armenia | 1–0 | 5–1 | FIFA World Cup 1998 qualifying |
| 10 | 9 October 1996 | Hrazdan Stadium, Yerevan, Armenia | Armenia | 3–0 | 5–1 | FIFA World Cup 1998 qualifying |
| 11 | 10 September 1997 | Westfalenstadion, Dortmund, Germany | Armenia | 3–0 | 4–0 | FIFA World Cup 1998 qualifying |

== Honours ==
1. FC Köln

- Bundesliga runner-up: 1988–89, 1989–90
- UEFA Cup runner-up: 1985–86

Juventus

- Supercoppa Italiana runner-up: 1990

Roma

- Coppa Italia runner-up: 1992–93
- Supercoppa Italiana runner-up: 1991

Karlsruher SC

- UEFA Intertoto Cup: 1996
- DFB-Pokal runner-up: 1995–96

Germany

- FIFA World Cup: 1990
- UEFA European Championship: 1996; runner-up: 1992
- Summer Olympic Games bronze medal: 1988

Individual

- kicker Bundesliga Team of the Season: 1987–88, 1988–89, 1989–90, 1995–96
- Footballer of the Year in Germany: 1989, 1992
- Onze Mondial: 1990, 1992
- UEFA European Championship Team of the Tournament: 1992
- FIFA World Player of the Year bronze award: 1992
- FIFA World Cup top assist provider: 1994
- DFB-Pokal top scorer: 1996
- World XI: 1999

== See also ==
- List of men's footballers with 100 or more international caps
- List of people from Berlin
