= Daniele Fortunato =

Italian footballer (born 1963)

Personal information
- Date of birth: 8 January 1963 (age 63)
- Place of birth: Samarate, Italy
- Height: 1.81 m (5 ft 11 in)
- Position: Midfielder

Senior career*
Years	Team	Apps	(Gls)
1980–1985	Legnano	142	(8)
1985–1987	L.R. Vicenza	61	(5)
1987–1989	Atalanta	66	(9)
1989–1991	Juventus	43	(4)
1991–1992	Bari	23	(2)
1992–1994	Torino	59	(4)
1994–1997	Atalanta	88	(6)
Total		482	(38)

Managerial career
- 2004–2007: Cuneo
- 2007–2008: Ivrea
- 2008: Pergocrema
- 2011: AlbinoLeffe (interim)
- 2011–2012: AlbinoLeffe
- 2014: Beira-Mar
- * Club domestic league appearances and goals

Daniele Fortunato (born 8 January 1963) is an Italian professional football coach and a former player, who played as a midfielder.

== Playing career ==
Fortunato was born in Samarate. He played for several Italian clubs throughout his career, and had a rather successful career in the Italian top flight level. After beginning his career with Legnano, he later played for L.R. Vicenza and Atalanta before joining Serie A powerhouse Juventus, spending two seasons with the club from 1989 to 1991, scoring 5 goals in 62 appearances; during his time with the Bianconeri, Fortunato also won a UEFA Cup-Coppa Italia double during the 1989–90 season under manager Dino Zoff, despite struggling with injuries throughout the course of his first season with the club. After spending the next season at Bari, he later also played for Juventus's cross city rivals Torino from 1992 to 1994, where he won a second Coppa Italia title during 1992–93 season, before joining Atalanta again in 1994, where he remained until his retirement in 1997.

== Style of play ==
A hardworking, tactically versatile and intelligent player, Fortunato was capable of playing anywhere in midfield, or even as a defender, due to his timing and positional sense. He was capable of playing on the wing, although he usually played in the centre as a defensive midfielder rather than as a deep-lying playmaker, where he usually functioned as a ball winner who was also capable of starting attacking plays after winning back possession courtesy of his solid technique and distribution. He was also capable of contributing to his team's offensive play with occasional goals. Despite his ability as a footballer, Fortunato often drew criticism throughout his career for his lack of notable pace.

== Coaching career ==
After his retirement, Fortunato started a coaching career as Emiliano Mondonico's assistant at Napoli and Cosenza, and then starting a head coaching career of his own with minor league teams Cuneo, Ivrea and Pergocrema.

In July 2010 he returned to work alongside his mentor Mondonico at Serie B club AlbinoLeffe, then taking over head coaching duties on 29 January 2011 after he was forced to take a sick leave due to health issues. Fortunato served as head coach for a total of two games, ended in a win and a loss, and returned to his previous assistant duties on 15 February 2011, after Mondonico successfully recovered from his health issues.

On 17 June 2011, he was permanently appointed as head coach of AlbinoLeffe, after Mondonico was forced to resign due to illness. He was sacked on 28 January 2012 due to poor results.

In February 2014 Fortunato was appointed coach of Beira-Mar, Portuguese second division club from the city of Aveiro. In June 2014, he was sacked from the club.

== Honours ==
=== Player ===
Juventus

- Coppa Italia: 1989–90
- UEFA Cup: 1989–90

Torino

- Coppa Italia: 1992–93
