= Carlos Aguilera (Uruguayan footballer) =

Uruguayan footballer (born 1964)

Personal information
- Full name: Carlos Alberto Aguilera Novas
- Date of birth: 21 September 1964 (age 62)
- Place of birth: Montevideo, Uruguay
- Height: 1.66 m (5 ft 5 in)
- Position: Forward

Senior career*
Years	Team	Apps	(Gls)
1980–1982	River Plate Montevideo	45	(19)
1983–1984	Nacional	43	(16)
1985	Independiente Medellín	30	(19)
1986–1987	Racing Club	11	(1)
1987–1988	Tecos	34	(9)
1988–1989	Peñarol	24	(11)
1989–1992	Genoa	96	(33)
1992–1994	Torino	37	(12)
1994–1999	Peñarol	70	(15)
Total		390	(135)

International career
1982–1997	Uruguay	64	(22)
Medal record
Representing Uruguay
Copa America
Winner	1983
Runner-up	1989 Brazil
- * Club domestic league appearances and goals

Carlos Alberto Aguilera Nova (born 21 September 1964) is a Uruguayan former professional footballer who played as a forward.

He started his professional career in 1980 with River Plate Montevideo and then Nacional, where they won the league in 1983. He then had short spells in Colombia, Argentina, and Mexico, before returning to Uruguay with Peñarol. He then played in the Italian Serie A between 1989 and 1994 with Genoa and Torino, playing 133 league matches and scoring 45 goals, and winning the Coppa Italia once. He returned to Peñarol, where he won the league five consecutive times, before retiring from professional football in 1999.

He represented Uruguay at international level between 1982 and 1997, earning a total of 64 caps and scoring 22 goals. He was part of the Uruguay squads at the 1983 and 1989 Copa Américas, winning the 1983 tournament as well as being the joint top scorer. He also represented Uruguay at the 1986 and 1990 World Cups.

== Club career ==
Aguilera began his career playing for River Plate Montevideo, from 1980 to 1982. From 1983 to 1985 he played in Club Nacional de Football, then passed to Independiente Medellín (1985), returned to Nacional (1986), Racing Club of Argentina (1986), again in Nacional (1987), and Tecos of Mexico (1987–88). In 1988, he went to Europe to play for Italian clubs Genoa C.F.C. (1989–92), and then A.C. Torino (1992–94). He returned to C.A. Peñarol in 1994, where he played until 1999, finishing a brilliant career. Whilst at Genoa he memorably scored two goals at Anfield to knock Liverpool out of the 1991–92 UEFA Cup.

In his second phase with Peñarol, he was Uruguayan Champion in 1994, 1995, 1996, 1997, and 1999.

== International career ==
Aguilera also played for the Uruguay national team, which won the Copa América in 1983. He represented Uruguay at the FIFA World Cup level in 1986, in Mexico, and 1990, in Italy.

== Career statistics ==
=== International ===
Appearances and goals by national team and year
National team	Year	Apps	Goals
Uruguay	1982	3	0
Uruguay	1983	13	5
Uruguay	1984	7	2
Uruguay	1985	13	8
Uruguay	1986	3	2
Uruguay	1989	10	4
Uruguay	1990	6	1
Uruguay	1993	9	0
Uruguay	1997	1	1
Total		65	23

Scores and results list Uruguay's goal tally first, score column indicates score after each Aguilera goal.

List of international goals scored by Carlos Aguilera
No.	Date	Venue	Opponent	Score	Result	Competition	Ref.
1	18 September 1983	Brígido Iriarte Stadium, Caracas, Venezuela	Venezuela	2–1	2–1	1983 Copa América	
2	26 September 1983	Bloomfield Stadium, Tel Aviv, Israel	Israel	1–0	2–2	Friendly	
3	26 September 1983	Bloomfield Stadium, Tel Aviv, Israel	Israel	2–2	2–2	Friendly	
4	13 October 1983	National Stadium of Peru, Lima, Peru	Peru	1–0	1–0	1983 Copa América	
5	4 November 1983	Estádio Fonte Nova, Salvador, Brazil	Brazil	1–1	1–1	1983 Copa América	
6	19 September 1984	Estadio Centenario, Montevideo, Uruguay	Peru	1–0	2–0	Friendly	
7	3 October 1984	National Stadium of Peru, Lima, Peru	Peru	2–0	3–1	Friendly	
8	29 January 1985	Estadio Centenario, Montevideo, Uruguay	East Germany	1–0	3–0	Friendly	
9	14 February 1985	Estadio Centenario, Montevideo, Uruguay	Finland	1–0	2–1	Friendly	
10	24 February 1985	Estadio Centenario, Montevideo, Uruguay	Colombia	1–0	3–0	Friendly	
11	10 March 1985	Estadio Centenario, Montevideo, Uruguay	Ecuador	1–0	2–1	1986 FIFA World Cup qualification	
12	28 April 1985	Estadio El Campín, Bogotá, Colombia	Colombia	1–1	1–2	Friendly	
13	26 May 1985	National Stadium, Tokyo, Japan	Japan	1–1	4–1	Friendly	
14	26 May 1985	National Stadium, Tokyo, Japan	Japan	4–1	4–1	Friendly	
15	1 June 1985	Osaka, Japan	Malaysia	–	6–0	Friendly	
16	2 February 1986	Miami Orange Bowl, Miami, United States	Canada	1–0	3–1	Friendly	
17	7 February 1986	Miami Orange Bowl, Miami, United States	United States	–	1–1	Friendly	
18	22 April 1989	Stadio Marcantonio Bentegodi, Verona, Italy	Italy	1–1	1–1	Friendly	
19	3 May 1989	Estadio Centenario, Montevideo, Uruguay	Ecuador	2–0	3–1	Friendly	
20	3 May 1989	Estadio Centenario, Montevideo, Uruguay	Ecuador	3–1	3–1	Friendly	
21	14 June 1989	Estadio Centenario, Montevideo, Uruguay	Bolivia	1–0	1–0	Friendly	
22	25 April 1990	Neckarstadion, Stuttgart, Germany	Germany	1–0	3–3	Friendly	
23	16 November 1997	Estadio Domingo Burgueño, Maldonado, Uruguay	Ecuador	5–2	5–3	1998 FIFA World Cup qualification	
