= 1992–93 Coppa Italia =

Tournament details
- Country: Italy
- Dates: 23 Aug 1992 – 19 June 1993
- Teams: 48

Final positions
- Champions: Torino (5th title)
- Runners-up: Roma

Tournament statistics
- Matches played: 78
- Goals scored: 227 (2.91 per match)
- Top goal scorer: Giuseppe Signori (6 goals)

The 1992–93 Coppa Italia, the 46th Coppa Italia was an Italian Football Federation domestic cup competition won by Torino.

== First round ==
Home team	Result	Away team
Ternana (2)	1–1 (p: 5–3)	Piacenza (2)
Sambenedettese (3)	0–1	Cagliari (1)
Avellino (3)	0–0 (p: 2–4)	Reggiana (2)
SPAL (2)	0–1	Pisa (2)
Perugia (3)	2–0	Cremonese (2)
Taranto (2)	2–1	Lucchese (2)
Vicenza (3)	0–4	Hellas Verona (2)
Casertana (3)	0–1	Modena (2)
Monza (2)	1–0 (aet)	Bologna (2)
Empoli (3)	1–2	Bari (2)
Messina (3)	0–2	Cesena (2)
Como (3)	1–2	Ascoli (2)
Venezia (2)	2–0	Cosenza (2)
Palermo (3)	2–2 (p: 6–7)	Lecce (2)
Genoa (1)	2–0	Giarre (3)
Fidelis Andria (2)	3–0	Padova (2)

p=after penalty kicks.

== Second round ==
Team 1	Agg.	Team 2	1st leg	2nd leg
Milan (1)	10–2	Ternana (2)	4–0	6–2
Cagliari (1)	6–4	Udinese (1)	2–0	4–4
Reggiana (2)	5–8	Internazionale (1)	3–4	2–4
Foggia (1)	3–2	Pisa (2)	1–0	2–2
Fiorentina (1)	4–1	Perugia (2)	1–0	3–1
Roma (1)	7–2	Taranto (2)	4–1	3–1
Brescia (1)	3–4	Hellas Verona (2)	2–3	1–1
Napoli (1)	6–0	Modena (2)	3–0	3–0
Monza (2)	2–4	Torino (1)	2–3	0–1
Bari (2)	6–5	Pescara (1)	3–3	3–2
Sampdoria (1)	2–2 (a)	Cesena (2)	2–1	0–1
Ascoli (2)	0–5	Lazio (1)	0–4	0–1
Atalanta (1)	2–3	Venezia (2)	1–1	1–2 (aet)
Parma (1)	1–0	Lecce (2)	1–0	0–0
Ancona (1)	3–6	Genoa (1)	2–1	1–5 (aet)
Juventus (1)	5–1	Fidelis Andria (2)	4–0	1–1

== Round of 16 ==
Team 1	Agg.	Team 2	1st leg	2nd leg
Milan (1)	3–0	Cagliari (1)	3–0	0–0
Foggia (1)	0–2	Internazionale (1)	0–0	0–2
Roma (1)	5–3	Fiorentina (1)	4–2	1–1
Napoli (1)	7–1	Hellas Verona (2)	2–1	5–0
Bari (2)	1–2	Torino (1)	1–1	0–1
Cesena (2)	2–4	Lazio (1)	1–1	1–3
Parma (1)	2–1	Venezia (2)	1–0	1–1
Juventus (1)	5–3	Genoa (1)	1–0	4–3

== Quarter-finals ==
=== First leg ===
27 January 1993	Milan	0–0	Inter Milan	San Siro, Milan

27 January 1993	Napoli	0–0	Roma	Stadio San Paolo, Naples

27 January 1993	Juventus	2–1	Parma	Stadio delle Alpi, Turin
	Vialli 77', 84'		Brolin 79'

28 January 1993	Lazio	2–2	Torino	Stadio Olimpico, Rome
	Neri 5'; Signori 34' (pen.)		Fusi 45'; Scifo 88'

=== Second leg ===
9 February 1993	Roma	2–0 (2–0 agg.)	Napoli	Stadio Olimpico, Rome
	Carnevale 10'; Häßler 71' (pen.)

10 February 1993	Inter Milan	0–3 (0–3 agg.)	Milan	San Siro, Milan
			Papin 5', 12'; Gullit 35'

10 February 1993	Torino	3–2 (5–4 agg.)	Lazio	Stadio delle Alpi, Turin
	Luzardi 45' (o.g.); Casagrande 62'; Sordo 76'		Signori 85'; Winter 87'

10 February 1993	Parma	1–1 (2–3 agg.)	Juventus	Stadio Ennio Tardini, Parma
	Brolin 36' (pen.)		Möller 62'

== Semi-finals ==
=== First leg ===
9 March 1993

Torino	1–1	Juventus
Poggi 79'		Baggio 49'

Stadio delle Alpi, Turin

10 March 1993

Roma	2–0	Milan
Muzzi 12'; Caniggia 89'

Stadio Olimpico, Rome

=== Second leg ===
30 March 1993

Milan	1–0	Roma
Eranio 37'

San Siro, Milan

Roma won 2–1 on aggregate.

31 March 1993

Juventus	2–2	Torino
Marchegiani 4' (o.g.); Ravanelli 62'		Poggi 52'; Carlos Aguilera 63'

Stadio delle Alpi, Turin

3–3 on aggregate. Torino won on the away goals rule.

== Final ==
=== First leg ===
12 June 1993
20:30

Torino	3–0	Roma
S. Benedetti 17' (o.g.); Cois 53'; D. Fortunato 78'

Stadio delle Alpi, Turin
Attendance: 43,732
Referee: Angelo Amendolia

=== Second leg ===
19 June 1993
20:30

Roma	5–2	Torino
Giannini 22', 49', 55' (pen.); Rizzitelli 47'; Mihajlović 65'		Silenzi 45', 53'

Stadio Olimpico, Rome
Attendance: 63,646
Referee: Carlo Sguizzato

5–5 on aggregate. Torino won on the away goals rule.

== Top goalscorers ==
Rank	Player	Club	Goals
1	(Italy) Giuseppe Signori	Lazio	6
2	(Federal Republic of Yugoslavia) Siniša Mihajlović	Roma	5
2	(Italy) Igor Protti	Bari	5
2	(North Macedonia) Darko Pančev	Internazionale	5
5	(Italy) Giuseppe Giannini	Roma	4
5	(Italy) Andrea Carnevale	Roma	4
5	(France) Jean-Pierre Papin	Milan	4
5	(Netherlands) Ruud Gullit	Milan	4
5	(Germany) Andreas Möller	Juventus	4
