= Andrea Borsa =

Italian footballer (born 1972)

Personal information
- Date of birth: January 21, 1972 (age 54)
- Place of birth: Rome, Italy
- Height: 1.78 m (5 ft 10 in)
- Position: Defender

Senior career*
Years	Team	Apps	(Gls)
1991–1992	Roma	0	(0)
1992–1993	Carrarese	25	(0)
1993–1994	Pistoiese	15	(0)
1994–1995	Roma	1	(0)
1995–1997	SPAL	38	(0)
1997–1998	Casarano	30	(0)
1998–1999	Battipagliese	26	(0)
1999–2000	Viterbese	3	(0)
2000–2002	Sambenedettese	49	(0)
2002–2004	Imolese	63	(2)
2004–2005	Fortis Spoleto		
- * Club domestic league appearances and goals

Andrea Borsa (born January 21, 1972) is an Italian former footballer who played as a defender. He made more than 200 appearances in the Italian professional leagues, including an appearance in Serie A for Roma in the 1994–95 season.
