= Valter Bonacina =

Italian footballer and coach

Personal information
- Date of birth: 30 July 1964 (age 62)
- Place of birth: Bergamo, Italy
- Height: 1.70 m (5 ft 7 in)
- Position: Midfielder

Youth career
- Cenate Sotto
- Virescit Boccaleone

Senior career*
Years	Team	Apps	(Gls)
1981–1986	Virescit Boccaleone	103	(2)
1986–1991	Atalanta	140	(10)
1991–1994	Roma	84	(2)
1994–1999	Atalanta	141	(1)
1999–2001	Monza	55	(2)
2001–2002	Rodengo Saiano	27	(3)

Managerial career
- 2010: Atalanta (caretaker)
- 2011: Foggia
- 2012: Foggia
- 2012–2017: Atalanta U19
- 2018–2019: Lazio U19
- 2020–2021: Spezia U19
- 2021: Villa Valle
- * Club domestic league appearances and goals

Valter Bonacina (born 30 July 1964) is an Italian association football coach and former player who played as a midfielder.

== Career ==
=== Playing career ===
He spent the majority of his career playing for Atalanta (10 seasons, 7 of which in Serie A) and Roma (3 seasons), and retired in 2002.

=== Coaching career ===
From 2003 to 2007, he served as assistant manager of Atalanta. In July 2007, he was then moved in charge of the Allievi Regionali youth team, and was successively promoted at the helm of the Primavera under-19 team in July 2009.

On 8 January 2010, he was then appointed head coach of Atalanta in a caretaker role, following Antonio Conte's resignation from his managerial position at the club. He then guided Atalanta on a Serie A Week 19 game that ended in a 0–1 away loss to Palermo on 10 January 2009 and returned to his previous role after Bortolo Mutti was appointed as head coach the very next day.

On 10 June 2011, he was announced as the new head coach of Lega Pro Prima Divisione club Foggia.

He coached the Under-19 squads in several clubs from 2012 to 2021. On 21 June 2021, he was hired as a head coach by Serie D club Villa Valle. He resigned on 3 November 2021, following a poor start to the season.
