= Fabio Petruzzi =

Italian footballer

Personal information
- Date of birth: 24 October 1970 (age 56)
- Place of birth: Rome, Italy
- Height: 1.79 m (5 ft 10 in)
- Position: Defender

Senior career*
Years	Team	Apps	(Gls)
1989–2000	Roma	127	(0)
1990–1992	→ Casertana (loan)	50	(0)
1993–1994	→ Udinese (loan)	1	(0)
2000–2004	Brescia	108	(4)
2004–2005	Bologna	17	(2)

International career
1995	Italy	1	(0)
- * Club domestic league appearances and goals

Fabio Petruzzi (Italian pronunciation: [ˈfaːbjo peˈtruttsi]; born 24 October 1970) is an Italian retired professional footballer who played as a defender.

== Club career ==
After developing in the Roma Youth System, he played for 13 seasons (253 games, 6 goals) in the Serie A, for the A.S. Roma senior (1988–2000), and subsequently Udinese Calcio (1993–94), Brescia Calcio (2000–2004), and Bologna F.C. 1909 (2004–05).

He began his professional career with Roma in 1988, later moving on a two-season loan to Serie C side Casertana, to gain experience, in 1990 helping the team to gain Serie B promotion in 1992. He returned to Rome in 1992, the following season, but struggled to gain playing time, and was sent on loan to Udinese the next season, in 1993. He moved back to Roma in 1994, where he played as a starter under managers Carlo Mazzone, Zdeněk Zeman, and Fabio Capello. He later moved to Brescia in 2000, where he joined his former Roma manager Mazzone, spending four seasons with the club alongside Roberto Baggio, and later, his former Roma teammate Luigi Di Biagio. He followed Mazzone to Bologna in 2004, although he was unable to help the club avoid Serie B relegation; he retired at the end of the season.

== International career ==
Petruzzi played his only game for the Italy national football team on June 21, 1995, in an international friendly match against Germany, in Zurich, under manager Arrigo Sacchi, which Italy lost 2–0. He was called up for two more national team games in 1995 and 1997, but did not make an appearance on either of those occasions.

== Punditry and youth coaching ==
After retiring, Petruzzi was a pundit for Rete Sport in Rome, then a youth coach.
