= Luigi Garzya =

Italian footballer

Personal information
- Full name: Luigi Amleto Garzya
- Date of birth: 7 July 1969 (age 57)
- Place of birth: San Cesario, Italy
- Height: 1.74 m (5 ft 9 in)
- Position: Defender

Senior career*
Years	Team	Apps	(Gls)
1985–1991	Lecce		
1987–1988	→ Reggina (loan)		
1991–1994	Roma		
1994–1996	Cremonese		
1996–2000	Bari		
2001–2003	Torino		
2003–2004	Grosseto		
2005	Taranto		

International career
- Italy U20
- Italy U21

Managerial career
- 2007–2008: Virtus Lanciano (assistant)
- 2008–2009: Crotone (assistant)
- 2009–2010: Frosinone (juniors)
- 2013–2015: Crotone (assistant)
- 2013–2015: Trapani (juniors)
- 2016–2017: Italy (assistant)
- 2017–2018: Italy U20 (coach)
- 2018: Italy U21 (coach)
- * Club domestic league appearances and goals

Luigi Garzya (born 7 July 1969) is a retired Italian professional footballer. During his career, he has played as a defender for A.S. Roma, A.S. Bari and Torino F.C.
