= Antonio Comi =

Italian footballer (born 1964)

Personal information
- Date of birth: 26 July 1964 (age 62)
- Place of birth: Seveso, Italy
- Height: 1.84 m (6 ft 0 in)
- Position: Midfielder

Youth career
- 197?–1982: Torino

Senior career*
Years	Team	Apps	(Gls)
1982–1989	Torino	149	(14)
1989–1994	Roma	96	(4)
1994–1995	Como	20	(0)
Total		265	(18)

International career
1985–1986	Italy U21	5	(0)
- * Club domestic league appearances and goals

Antonio Comi (born 26 July 1964) is an Italian former professional footballer who played as a midfielder and the current general manager of Torino.

His son, Gianmario Comi, is also a footballer.

== Playing career ==
=== Torino ===
Comi grew up in the Torino youth sector and made his debut for the senior team on 20 Match 1983 against Fiorentina (2–0), replacing Carlo Borghi. On 18 May of that same year, Comi made his debut in Coppa Italia and scored his first goal for the Granata, doubling Torino's lead against Napoli. (2–0) in the quarter-finals.

He remained at Torino for six seasons, until the club was relegated to Serie B in 1989.

=== Roma ===
In 1989 Comi was sold to Roma, with whom he remained just little over five seasons. In November 1994, he transferred to Como in Serie B where he ended his career.

== Post-playing career ==
Comi returned Torino in 2001 as technical coordinator of the youth sector, and later became head of the youth sector in 2003, a post he continued to hold even after the club went bankrupt in 2005 at the behest of the new president Urbano Cairo. On 29 July 2011 he was appointed Director at Torino. On 5 July 2014, his contract was renewed to 30 June 2016.

In September 2012 he began the course for sporting director at Coverciano.

== Career statistics ==
As of 11 June 1995.

Season	Club	League			Domestic cups			Continental cups			Other cups			Total	
Season	Club	Comp	App	Goal	Comp	App	Goal	Comp	App	Goal	Comp	App	Goal	App	Goal
1982–83	Torino	A	5	0	CI	3	1	-	-	-	-	-	-	8	1
1983–84	Torino	A	11	1	CI	5	0	-	-	-	-	-	-	16	1
1984–85	Torino	A	17	0	CI	6	1	-	-	-	-	-	-	23	1
1985–86	Torino	A	30	7	CI	9	4	CU	4	2	TE	4	0	47	13
1986–87	Torino	A	29	3	CI	7	2	CU	8	4	-	-	-	44	9
1987–88	Torino	A	29+1	3	CI	13	2	-	-	-	-	-	-	43	5
1988–89	Torino	A	28	0	CI	8	3	-	-	-	-	-	-	36	3
Total Torino			149+1	14		51	13		12	6		4	0	217	33
1989–90	Roma	A	31	1	CI	6	-	-	-	-	-	-	-	37	1
1990–91	Roma	A	18	0	CI	3	-	CU	11	-	-	-	-	32	-
1991–92	Roma	A	10	0	CI	2	-	CdC	1	-	SI	0	0	13	-
1992–93	Roma	A	24	2	CI	8	-	CU	5	-	-	-	-	37	2
1993–94	Roma	A	13	1	CI	3	-	-	-	-	-	-	-	16	1
1994–95	Roma	A	0	0	CI	0	0	-	-	-	-	-	-	0	0
Total Roma			96	4		22	-		17	-		0	0	135	4
Nov. 1994–95	Como	B	20	0	CI	X	X	-	-	-	-	-	-	X	X
Total career			265+1	18		X	X		29	6		4	0	X	X

== Honours ==
Roma

- Coppa Italia: 1990–91
