= Giovanni Piacentini =

Italian footballer

Personal information
- Date of birth: 9 April 1968 (age 58)
- Place of birth: Modena, Italy
- Height: 1.77 m (5 ft 10 in)
- Position: Midfielder

Senior career*
Years	Team	Apps	(Gls)
1984–1987	Modena	67	(1)
1987–1989	Padova	76	(1)
1989–1995	Roma	144	(1)
1995–1997	Fiorentina	59	(0)
1998–1999	Atalanta	33	(0)
1999–2001	Bologna	37	(1)
Total		216	(4)

International career
1990	Italy U-21	3	(0)
- * Club domestic league appearances and goals

Giovanni Piacentini (born 9 April 1968 in Modena) is an Italian former professional footballer who played as a midfielder.

He played for 11 seasons (255 games, 2 goals) in the Serie A for A.S. Roma, ACF Fiorentina, Atalanta B.C. and Bologna F.C. 1909.

== Honours ==
Fiorentina

- Coppa Italia: 1995–96
- Supercoppa Italiana: 1996
