= 1992–93 Serie A =

91st season of top-tier Italian football

Serie A
- Season: 1992–93
- Dates: 6 September 1992 – 6 June 1993
- Champions: Milan; 13th title
- Relegated: Brescia; Fiorentina; Ancona; Pescara
- European Cup: Milan
- Cup Winners' Cup: Parma; Torino
- UEFA Cup: Internazionale; Juventus; Lazio; Cagliari
- Matches: 306
- Goals: 858 (2.8 per match)
- Top goalscorer: Giuseppe Signori (26 goals)

1992–93 Serie A team distribution

In 1992–93, the Serie A title was retained by Milan, who finished four points ahead of Internazionale. Third placed Parma enjoyed European glory in the European Cup Winners Cup, while unfancied Cagliari crept into the UEFA Cup qualification places at the expense of the 1991 champions and 1992 European Cup finalists Sampdoria. Roma and Napoli finished mid table after disappointing campaigns, while Brescia, Fiorentina, Ancona and Pescara were all relegated.

== Teams ==
Brescia, Pescara, Ancona and Udinese had been promoted from Serie B.

== Personnel and Sponsoring ==
Team	Head Coach	Kit manufacturer	Shirt sponsor
Ancona	(Italy) Vincenzo Guerini	Umbro	Latte Tre Valli
Atalanta	(Italy) Marcello Lippi	Lotto	Tamoil
Brescia	(Romania) Mircea Lucescu	Uhlsport	CAB
Cagliari	(Italy) Carlo Mazzone	Umbro	Pecorino Sardo
Fiorentina	(Italy) Luciano Chiarugi	Lotto	7 Up
Foggia	(Czech Republic) Zdeněk Zeman	Adidas	Banca Mediterranea
Genoa	(Italy) Claudio Maselli	Erreà	Saiwa
Internazionale	(Italy) Osvaldo Bagnoli	Umbro	Fiorucci
Juventus	(Italy) Giovanni Trapattoni	Kappa	Danone
Lazio	(Italy) Dino Zoff	Umbro	Banco di Roma
Milan	(Italy) Fabio Capello	Adidas	Motta
Napoli	(Italy) Ottavio Bianchi	Umbro	Voiello
Parma	(Italy) Nevio Scala	Umbro	Parmalat
Pescara	(Italy) Vincenzo Zucchini	Pienne	Gelati Gis
Roma	(Federal Republic of Yugoslavia) Vujadin Boškov	Adidas	Barilla
Sampdoria	(Sweden) Sven-Göran Eriksson	Asics	Erg
Torino	(Italy) Emiliano Mondonico	ABM	Fratelli Beretta
Udinese	(Italy) Adriano Fedele	Lotto	Gaudianello

== League table ==
Pos	Team	Pld	W	D	L	GF	GA	GD	Pts	Qualification or relegation
1	Milan (C)	34	18	14	2	65	32	+33	50	Qualification to European Cup
2	Internazionale	34	17	12	5	59	36	+23	46	Qualification to UEFA Cup
3	Parma (Note: Parma qualified to 1993–94 UEFA Cup Winners' Cup as defending champions.)	34	16	9	9	47	34	+13	41	Qualification to Cup Winners' Cup
4	Juventus	34	15	9	10	59	47	+12	39	Qualification to UEFA Cup
5	Lazio	34	13	12	9	65	51	+14	38	Qualification to UEFA Cup
6	Cagliari	34	14	9	11	45	33	+12	37	Qualification to UEFA Cup
7	Sampdoria	34	12	12	10	50	48	+2	36	
8	Atalanta	34	14	8	12	42	44	−2	36	
9	Torino	34	9	17	8	38	38	0	35	Qualification to Cup Winners' Cup
10	Roma	34	8	17	9	42	39	+3	33	
11	Napoli	34	10	12	12	49	50	−1	32	
12	Foggia	34	10	12	12	39	55	−16	32	
13	Genoa	34	7	17	10	41	55	−14	31	
14	Udinese	34	10	10	14	42	48	−6	30	Relegation tie-breaker
15	Brescia (Note: Brescia lost Relegation tie-breaker 1–3 vs.Udinese on 12 June 1993 then relegated to 1993-94 Serie B.) (R)	34	9	12	13	36	44	−8	30	Serie B after tie-breaker
16	Fiorentina (R)	34	8	14	12	53	56	−3	30 (Note: Fiorentina relegated for head-to-head points (Brescia 5; Udinese 4; Fiorentina 3).)	Relegation to Serie B
17	Ancona (R)	34	6	7	21	39	73	−34	19	Relegation to Serie B
18	Pescara (R)	34	6	5	23	47	75	−28	17	Relegation to Serie B

Source: 1992–93 Serie A, RSSSF.com
Rules for classification: 1) Points; 2) Head-to-head points; 3) Head-to-head goal difference; 4) Goal difference; 5) Goals scored; 6) Draw.(Note:
(C) Champions; (R) Relegated

== Results ==
Home \ Away	ANC	ATA	BRE	CAG	FIO	FOG	GEN	INT	JUV	LAZ	MIL	NAP	PAR	PES	ROM	SAM	TOR	UDI
Ancona	—	0–2	5–1	0–1	2–1	3–0	0–0	3–0	0–1	0–3	1–3	1–1	1–1	5–3	1–1	2–3	0–1	1–0
Atalanta	2–1	—	1–1	2–1	2–1	2–1	1–2	1–1	2–1	2–2	1–1	3–2	2–1	2–1	3–1	1–2	0–0	2–0
Brescia	1–1	2–0	—	0–2	1–1	4–1	2–2	1–3	2–0	2–0	0–1	2–1	0–1	1–0	0–2	3–1	0–0	2–1
Cagliari	3–0	2–1	3–1	—	2–1	1–1	3–0	0–0	0–0	1–1	1–1	1–0	0–1	4–0	1–0	0–2	0–0	1–1
Fiorentina	7–1	0–1	2–2	2–1 (Note: The match was played at Stadio Marc'Antonio Bentegodi.)	—	6–2	1–1	2–2	2–0	0–2	3–7	1–1	1–1	2–0	2–1	4–0	0–0	2–2
Foggia	1–0	1–0	0–0	1–1	1–0	—	2–2	1–3	2–1	2–1	2–2	2–4	1–0	1–0	0–0	1–0	0–0	1–0
Genoa	4–4	1–0	1–1	2–3	2–2	0–0	—	1–1	2–2	2–3	2–2	2–1	1–1	4–3	0–0	0–0	2–1	1–0
Internazionale	3–0	1–0	2–1	3–1	2–2	1–1	4–0	—	3–1	2–0	1–1	0–0	2–1	2–0	1–1	0–0	3–0	2–2
Juventus	5–1	4–1	0–0	2–1	3–0	4–2	1–0	0–2	—	4–1	0–1	4–3	2–2	2–1	1–1	1–1	2–1	5–1
Lazio	5–0	3–0	2–0	1–2	2–2	1–1	1–1	3–1	1–1	—	2–2	4–3	5–2	2–1	1–1	2–1	1–2	4–0
Milan	2–0	2–0	1–1	1–0	2–0	1–0	1–0	1–1	1–3	5–3	—	2–2	0–1	4–0	0–0	4–0	0–0	1–1
Napoli	0–0	1–0	0–0	1–0	4–1	2–0	2–2	1–2	2–3	3–1	1–5	—	1–1	2–0	2–1	1–1	1–1	3–0
Parma	3–0	0–0	2–0	3–1	1–1	4–0	1–0	2–0	2–1	2–1	0–2	1–1	—	1–0	3–1	1–0	2–2	3–1
Pescara	4–3	2–0	2–0	0–1	0–2	2–4	1–2	1–4	5–1	2–3	4–5	3–0	0–2	—	1–1	2–2	2–2	2–2
Roma	2–1	2–2	2–3	1–1	1–1	3–1	3–0	4–1	2–1	0–0	0–1	1–1	1–0	0–1	—	0–0	4–5	1–1
Sampdoria	3–1	2–3	1–0	2–0	2–0	3–3	4–1	1–3	1–1	3–3	1–2	3–1	2–1	1–1	2–2	—	0–1	2–0
Torino	4–1	1–1	1–0	0–5	1–1	1–1	1–1	1–2	1–2	1–1	1–1	0–1	3–0	3–1	0–0	2–2	—	1–0
Udinese	2–0	1–2	2–2	2–1	4–0	3–2	3–0	2–1	0–0	0–0	0–0	2–0	1–0	5–2	1–2	1–2	1–0	—

Legend: Blue = home team win; Yellow = draw; Red = away team win.

== Relegation tie-breaker ==
12 June 1993

Udinese	3–1	Brescia
Balbo 14'; Orlando 59'; Dell'Anno 88'		Domini 28'

Stadio Renato Dall'Ara, Bologna
Referee: Graziano Cesari (Genoa)

Brescia relegated to the 1993–94 Serie B.

== Top goalscorers ==
Rank	Player	Club	Goals
1	(Italy) Giuseppe Signori	Lazio	26
2	(Italy) Roberto Baggio	Juventus	21
2	(Argentina) Abel Balbo	Udinese	21
4	(Uruguay) Rubén Sosa	Internazionale	20
5	(Argentina) Gabriel Batistuta	Fiorentina	16
5	(Uruguay) Daniel Fonseca	Napoli	16
7	(Italy) Roberto Mancini	Sampdoria	15
8	(Italy) Maurizio Ganz	Atalanta	14
9	(France) Jean-Pierre Papin	Milan	13
9	(Romania) Florin Răducioiu	Brescia	13
9	(Netherlands) Marco van Basten	Milan	13

== Season tickets ==
The season ticket sales as they were before the beginning of the season:

Rank	Club	Tickets
1	Milan	73,034
2	Napoli	41,186
3	Juventus	37,406
4	Roma	33,659
5	Lazio	30,269
6	Inter	27,496
7	Fiorentina	25.006
8	Sampdoria	24,000
9	Genoa	19.768
10	Parma	19.651
11	Torino	16,798
12	Cagliari	13.174
13	Pescara	12.364
14	Udinese	11.814
15	Atalanta	9.426
16	Ancona	5.455
17	Brescia	4.888
	Foggia	n/a

== Attendances ==
No.	Club	Average
1	Milan	75,830
2	Napoli	58,599
3	Roma	50,306
4	Lazio	49,105
5	Juventus	45,868
6	Internazionale	45,126
7	Fiorentina	34,472
8	Sampdoria	30,856
9	Genoa	27,803
10	Torino	26,914
11	Parma	23,792
12	Cagliari	21,773
13	Udinese	20,228
14	Atalanta	19,976
15	Pescara	16,387
16	Foggia	14,207
17	Brescia	13,839
18	Ancona	11,845

== Sources ==
- Almanacco Illustrato del Calcio - La Storia 1898-2004, Panini Edizioni, Modena, September 2005
