= Silvano Benedetti =

Italian former footballer

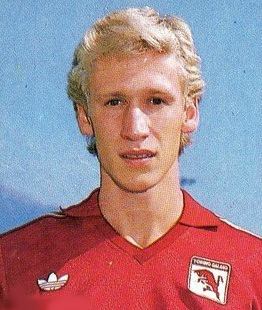
- Benedetti with Torino (1988)

Personal information
- Date of birth: 5 October 1965 (age 61)
- Place of birth: Lucca, Italy
- Height: 1.86 m (6 ft 1 in)
- Position: Defender

Youth career
- Torino

Senior career*
Years	Team	Apps	(Gls)
1983–1992	Torino	126	(6)
1984–1985	→ Parma (loan)	21	(0)
1985–1986	→ Palermo (loan)	35	(1)
1986–1987	→ Ascoli (loan)	26	(0)
1992–1995	Roma	51	(4)
1996	Alessandria	14	(0)
1996–2000	Chieri	91	(14)
Total		364	(25)

International career
1986–1990	Italy U21	17	(2)
- * Club domestic league appearances and goals

Silvano Benedetti (born 5 October 1965) is an Italian former professional footballer who played as a defender.

His son Simone is a footballer.

== Club career ==
Raised in Turin, after two years in Serie B with Parma and Palermo he was loaned to Ascoli, newly promoted to Serie A, debuting 14 September 1986 in Milan - Ascoli (0–1), after serving a month ban following a betting scandal in which he was involved. Returning to Torino, he remained there for four seasons, suffering relegation at the end of 1988–89, the immediate promotion (1989–90), success in the Mitropa Cup and the final of the UEFA Cup in 1991–92. At the end of that season was bought by Roma.

With the Giallorossi he played as a starter in the 1992–93 season, when the team lost Coppa Italia final, in which he scored an own goal against Torino in the final. With Roma he scored four goals in total. He closed his career after a brief stint at Alexandria in Serie C1.

He made a total of 166 appearances in Serie A with Ascoli, Torino and Roma, scoring 7 goals.

Since 2001 he has been part of the Torino staff, focusing specifically on the football school. On 5 July 2014 his contract was renewed to 30 June 2016, as the head of Torino youth system.

== Honours ==
=== Club ===
Torino

- UEFA Cup: 1991–92 Runner-up
- Serie B: 1989–90
- Mitropa Cup: 1991

Ascoli

- Mitropa Cup: 1987
