= Roberto Muzzi =

Italian football player and manager (born 1971)

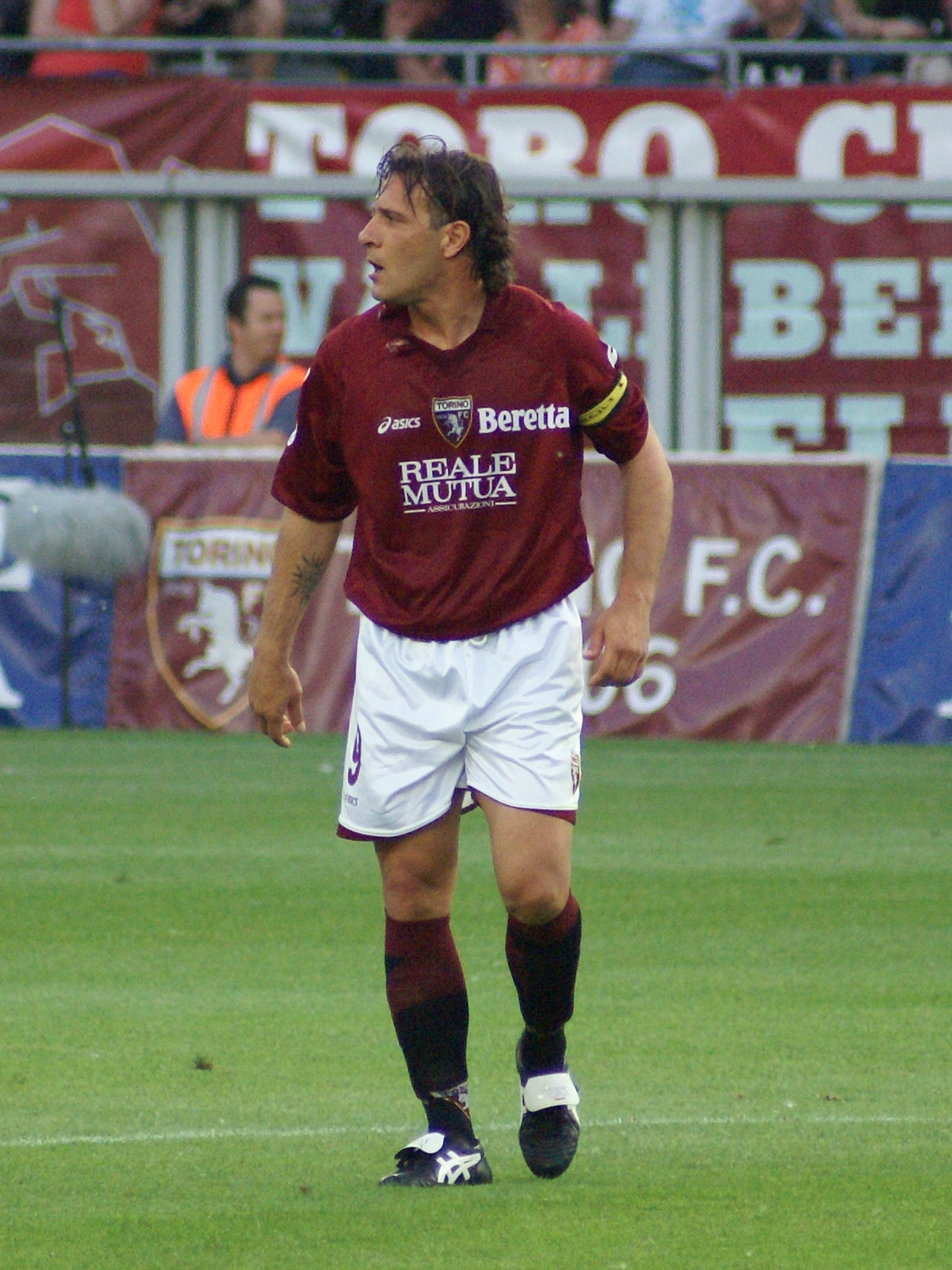
- Muzzi with Torino in 2007

Personal information
- Date of birth: 21 September 1971 (age 55)
- Place of birth: Rome, Italy
- Height: 1.78 m (5 ft 10 in)
- Position: Striker

Team information
- Current team: Cagliari (club manager)

Youth career
- Roma

Senior career*
Years	Team	Apps	(Gls)
1990–1994	Roma	57	(6)
1993–1994	→ Pisa (loan)	23	(8)
1994–1999	Cagliari	144	(58)
1999–2003	Udinese	103	(39)
2003–2005	Lazio	39	(4)
2005–2007	Torino	57	(10)
2007–2008	Padova	23	(4)
Total		446	(129)

International career
1989	Italy U18	5	(3)
1990–1994	Italy U21	19	(4)
1992	Olympic Italy	5	(0)

Managerial career
- 2019–2020: Empoli
- 2022: Cagliari (caretaker)
Medal record
Men's football
Representing Italy
UEFA European Under-21 Championship
Winner	1992 Europe
Winner	1994 France
- * Club domestic league appearances and goals

Roberto Muzzi (Italian pronunciation: [roˈbɛrto ˈmuttsi]; born 21 September 1971) is an Italian former professional footballer who played as a striker: He works as a "club manager" for Cagliari.

During his career, he played for several Italian clubs including Roma, Pisa, Cagliari, Udinese, and Lazio. He was also part of the Italy U-21 team from 1990 to 1994, playing 19 matches and scoring 4 goals under manager Cesare Maldini, and winning the UEFA European Under-21 Championship in 1992 and 1994; he also took part at the 1992 Summer Olympics, although he never received a call-up for the senior Italy side. He was known in particular for his electrifying speed as a forward.

== Playing career ==
Muzzi started his career with Roma, making his debut in Serie A on 11 February 1990, in a league match against Inter ended in a 1–1 tie, and scoring his first goal the following season. With Roma, he won the Coppa Italia in 1991, also helping his side to reach an all-Italian UEFA Cup Final that season, losing out to Inter, also missing out on the 1991 Supercoppa Italiana, which was won by Sampdoria.

Muzzi was loaned to Serie B club Pisa in November 1993, where he scored 8 goals in 23 games. He then returned to Roma only to be sold in November 1994 to Cagliari, where he then spent four seasons, playing a total 144 games with 31 Serie A goals and 17 in Serie B.

Muzzi joined Udinese during the 1999–2000 season, spending four more seasons with the zebrette; in total, he played 103 games for the club, scoring 39 goals, winning the 2000 UEFA Intertoto Cup, which enabled the Friuli side to qualify for the UEFA Cup the following season. He then returned to Rome to join Lazio for the 2003–04 season; although he was not a regular first-team member, his performances often proved to be decisive on the pitch, as shown by his goal which enabled Lazio to avoid relegation during the 2004–05 season; during his time with the club, he won the 2003–04 Coppa Italia, also reaching the semi-finals of the 2003–04 UEFA Cup, but missed out on the 2004 Supercoppa Italiana to Milan. In September 2005, he joined Serie B side Torino, and was one of the protagonists in the granata's return to the top flight. His second season with Torino, now in Serie A, saw Muzzi scoring only three goals.

In September 2006, at the age of 35, and after having turned down a youth coach role at Torino, he agreed a two-year contract with Serie C1's Padova. In October 2008 he announced his retirement from active football.

== Coaching and managerial career ==
After retirement, Muzzi became coach of the Roma youth side in 2009, serving on numerous different positions within the club until 2015. He subsequently joined Andrea Stramaccioni's coaching staff at Panathinaikos and Sparta Prague. In 2019, Muzzi was named assistant coach under Aurelio Andreazzoli of Empoli before moving to Genoa together.

On 14 November 2019, Muzzi was appointed coach of Serie B club Empoli, signing a deal with the Tuscan club till the end of the 2019–20 Serie B season. However, following a string of disappointing results during his short tenure at the club, he was sacked on 26 January 2020.

In July 2020, Muzzi was named technical director of Eccellenza amateurs Lupa Frascati. One month later, following the club's takeover by the Lupa Frascati owners, he was announced as new youth system chief of then-Serie C club Arezzo. On 5 February 2022, Muzzi was dismissed from his role.

In July 2022, Cagliari appointed Muzzi as director of football alongside Stefano Capozucca and dealing with organizational and management matters within the first team squad. On 20 December 2022, following the dismissal of Fabio Liverani, Muzzi was appointed interim head coach. Following the appointment of Claudio Ranieri as new head coach, Muzzi filled in for a single game, a 2–0 win against Cosenza, although he could not serve from the dugout and had to be replaced by Fabio Pisacane due to him being sick.

== Honours ==
Roma

- Coppa Italia: 1990–91

Udinese

- UEFA Intertoto Cup: 2000

Lazio

- Coppa Italia: 2003–04

Italy U21

- UEFA European Under-21 Championship: 1992, 1994
