= 1990–91 AS Roma season =

Italian football club season

AS Roma
1990–91 season
- President: Dino Viola (until January 19); Flora Viola (until May 24); Giuseppe Ciarrapico
- Manager: Ottavio Bianchi
- Stadium: Olimpico
- Serie A: 9th
- Coppa Italia: Winners (in 1991–92 European Cup Winners' Cup)
- UEFA Cup: Runners-up
- Top goalscorer: League: Rudi Völler (11); All: Rudi Völler (21)
Home colours	Away colours

The 1990–91 season saw AS Roma win Coppa Italia and reach the final of the UEFA Cup, which compensated for Ottavio Bianchi's problematic league season, where Roma finished a mere ninth place, their worst season since 1978–79.

In the UEFA Cup, the club reached the two-legged final, where Inter won at home 2–0, a result which a Ruggiero Rizzitelli goal in the return leg could not cancel out. Instead, a 3–1 win at home and a draw at the Stadio Luigi Ferraris against Sampdoria secured the 1990–91 Coppa Italia, the club's seventh Coppa Italia.

== Players ==
Note: Flags indicate national team as defined under FIFA eligibility rules; some limited exceptions apply. Players may hold more than one non-FIFA nationality.

Pos.	Nation	Player
GK	ITA	Giovanni Cervone
GK	ITA	Angelo Peruzzi
GK	ITA	Giuseppe Zinetti
DF	FRG	Thomas Berthold
DF	BRA	Aldair
DF	ITA	Antonio Comi
DF	ITA	Manuel Gerolin
DF	ITA	Sebastiano Nela
DF	ITA	Stefano Pellegrini
DF	ITA	Dario Rossi
DF	ITA	Antonio Tempestilli
DF	ITA	Amedeo Carboni

Pos.	Nation	Player
MF	ITA	Bruno Conti
MF	ITA	Fabrizio Di Mauro
MF	ITA	Giampiero Maini
MF	ITA	Giuseppe Giannini
MF	ITA	Stefano Desideri
MF	ITA	Fausto Salsano
MF	ITA	Giovanni Piacentini
MF	ITA	Daniele Berretta
FW	ITA	Ruggiero Rizzitelli
FW	FRG	Rudi Völler
FW	ITA	Andrea Carnevale
FW	ITA	Roberto Muzzi

=== Transfers ===
In
Pos.	Name	from	Type
FW	Andrea Carnevale	SSC Napoli	
DF	Aldair	Benfica	
DF	Amedeo Carboni	Sampdoria	
MF	Fausto Salsano	Sampdoria	
GK	Angelo Peruzzi	Hellas Verona	loan ended
GK	Giuseppe Zinetti	Delfino Pescara	

Out
Pos.	Name	To	Type
GK	Franco Tancredi	Torino	
GK	Ferro Tontini	Cosenza	
DF	Ugo Cipelli	Mantova	
DF	Lionello Manfredonia		retired
DF	Fabio Petruzzi	Casertana	loan
MF	Alessandro Cucciari	Hellas Verona	
MF	Stefano Impallomeni	Delfino Pescara	
MF	Francesco Statuto	Casertana	loan
FW	Leonardo Aiello	Casertana	
FW	Paolo Baldieri	Delfino Pescara	

== Competitions ==
=== Overall ===
Competition	Started round	Final position	First match	Last match
Serie A	Matchday 1	9th	9 September 1990	26 May 1991
Coppa Italia	Second round	Winners	5 September 1990	9 June 1991
UEFA Cup	First round	Runners-up	19 September 1990	22 May 1991

=== Serie A ===
==== League table ====
Pos	Team	Pld	W	D	L	GF	GA	GD	Pts	Qualification or relegation
7	Juventus	34	13	11	10	45	32	+13	37	
8	Napoli	34	11	15	8	37	37	0	37	
9	Roma	34	11	14	9	43	37	+6	36	Qualification to Cup Winners' Cup
10	Atalanta	34	11	13	10	38	37	+1	35	
11	Lazio	34	8	19	7	33	36	−3	35	

Source: 1990–91 Serie A, RSSSF.com
Rules for classification: 1) Points; 2) Head-to-head points; 3) Head-to-head goal difference; 4) Goal difference; 5) Goals scored; 6) Draw.

==== Results summary ====
Overall								Home						Away					
Pld	W	D	L	GF	GA	GD	Pts	W	D	L	GF	GA	GD	W	D	L	GF	GA	GD
34	11	14	9	43	37	+6	47	8	6	3	27	12	+15	3	8	6	16	25	−9

Last updated: 26 May 1991.
Source: Competitive matches

==== Results by round ====
Round	1	2	3	4	5	6	7	8	9	10	11	12	13	14	15	16	17	18	19	20	21	22	23	24	25	26	27	28	29	30	31	32	33	34	35
Ground	H	A	H	A	A	H	A	H	A	H	A	A	-	H	A	H	A	H	A	H	A	H	H	A	H	A	H	A	H	H	A	H	A	H	A
Result	W	L	W	L	L	W	L	W	L	W	D	L	-	D	D	D	D	L	D	W	W	D	W	D	D	D	L	W	D	L	D	W	D	D	W
Position	1	7	5	7	12	7	12	8	8	8	9	10	10	10	11	9	11	11	11	10	9	9	8	8	9	9	9	9	10	10	10	9	10	9	9

Updated to match(es) played on 26 May 1991. Source: Competitive matches
A = Away; H = Home; W = Win; D = Draw; L = Loss

==== Matches ====
9 September 1990 1	Roma	4–0	Fiorentina	Rome
	Völler 17'; Salsano 42'; Carnevale 62' (pen.), 65'	Report		Stadium: Stadio Olimpico; Referee: Rosario Lo Bello

16 September 1990 2	Genoa	3–0	Roma	Genoa
	Onorati 11'; Aguilera 43', 48' (pen.)	Report		Stadium: Stadio Luigi Ferraris; Referee: Gianni Beschin

23 September 1990 3	Roma	1–0	Bari	Rome
	Carnevale 48'	Report		Stadium: Stadio Olimpico; Referee: Arcangelo Pezzella

30 September 1990 4	Internazionale	2–1	Roma	Milan
	Klinsmann 76'; Pizzi 78'	Report	Carnevale 30'	Stadium: San Siro; Referee: Pietro D'Elia

7 October 1990 5	Torino	1–0	Roma	Turin
	Romano 60'	Report		Stadium: Stadio delle Alpi; Referee: Angelo Amendolia

21 October 1990 6	Roma	3–0	Lecce	Rome
	Salsano 54'; Rizzitelli 63'; Völler 73'	Report		Stadium: Stadio Olimpico; Referee: Fabio Baldas

28 October 1990 7	Parma	2–1	Roma	Parma
	Brolin 33'; Nela 45' (o.g.)	Report	Giannini 38'	Stadium: Stadio Ennio Tardini; Referee: Alfredo Trentalange

11 November 1990 8	Roma	4–1	Cesena	Rome
	Desideri 48'; Völler 51', 56'; Muzzi 83'	Report	Gerolin 82' (o.g.)	Stadium: Stadio Olimpico; Referee: Walter Cinciripini

18 November 1990 9	Juventus	5–0	Roma	Turin
	Schillaci 23', 29', 61'; Aldair 55' (o.g.); R. Baggio 90'	Report		Stadium: Stadio delle Alpi; Referee: Loris Stafoggia

25 November 1990 10	Roma	4–1	Bologna	Rome
	Berthold 27'; Aldair 60'; Desideri 88'; Völler 90'	Report	Poli 37'	Stadium: Stadio Olimpico; Referee: Pierluigi Pairetto

2 December 1990 11	Lazio	1–1	Roma	Rome
	Sosa 55'	Report	Völler 45' (pen.)	Stadium: Stadio Olimpico; Referee: Rosario Lo Bello

16 December 1990 13	Roma	0–0	Milan	Rome
		Report		Stadium: Stadio Olimpico; Referee: Angelo Amendolia

30 December 1990 14	Atalanta	2–2	Roma	Bergamo
	Bordin 3'; Caniggia 25'	Report	Bigliardi 52' (o.g.); Giannini 62'	Stadium: Stadio Atleti Azzurri d'Italia; Referee: Pierluigi Pairetto

6 January 1991 15	Roma	0–0	Cagliari	Rome
		Report		Stadium: Stadio Olimpico; Referee: Giovanni Merlino

13 January 1991 16	Napoli	1–1	Roma	Naples
	Zola 15'	Report	Salsano 65'	Stadium: Stadio San Paolo; Referee: Werter Cornieti

20 January 1991 17	Roma	0–2	Pisa	Rome
		Report	Larsen 59'; Lucarelli 68'	Stadium: Stadio Olimpico; Referee: Moreno Frigerio

23 January 1991 12	Sampdoria	2–1	Roma	Genoa
	Tempestilli 12' (o.g.); Vialli 55'	Report	Tempestilli 13'	Stadium: Stadio Luigi Ferraris; Referee: Arcangelo Pezzella

27 January 1991 18	Fiorentina	1–1	Roma	Florence
	Buso 36'	Report	Salsano 48'	Stadium: Stadio Artemio Franchi; Referee: Tullio Lanese

3 February 1991 19	Roma	3–1	Genoa	Rome
	Giannini 40'; Di Mauro 45'; Völler 80'	Report	Aguilera 58'	Stadium: Stadio Olimpico; Referee: Luciano Luci

10 February 1991 20	Bari	0–1	Roma	Bari
		Report	Nela 83'	Stadium: Stadio San Nicola; Referee: Robert Anthony Boggi

17 February 1991 21	Roma	1–1	Internazionale	Rome
	Rizzitelli 81'	Report	Berti 67'	Stadium: Stadio Olimpico; Referee: Piero Ceccarini

24 February 1991 22	Roma	2–0	Torino	Rome
	Aldair 18'; Völler 83' (pen.)	Report		Stadium: Stadio Olimpico; Referee: Pietro D'Elia

3 March 1991 23	Lecce	1–1	Roma	Lecce
	Pasculli 29' (pen.)	Report	Muzzi 14'	Stadium: Stadio Via del Mare; Referee: Rosario Lo Bello

10 March 1991 24	Roma	1–1	Parma	Rome
	Di Mauro 35'	Report	Brolin 30'	Stadium: Stadio Olimpico; Referee: Tullio Lanese

17 March 1991 25	Cesena	1–1	Roma	Cesena
	Ciocci 65' (pen.)	Report	Völler 59'	Stadium: Stadio Dino Manuzzi; Referee: Moreno Frigerio

24 March 1991 26	Roma	0–1	Juventus	Rome
		Report	Casiraghi 47'	Stadium: Stadio Olimpico; Referee: Werter Cornieti

30 March 1991 27	Bologna	2–3	Roma	Bologna
	Détári 27'; Türkyılmaz 31' (pen.)	Report	Rizzitelli 35'; Desideri 64'; Völler 83' (pen.)	Stadium: Stadio Renato Dall'Ara; Referee: Luciano Luci

6 April 1991 28	Roma	1–1	Lazio	Rome
	Völler 53' (pen.)	Report	Sosa 80'	Stadium: Stadio Olimpico; Referee: Pierluigi Pairetto

14 April 1991 29	Roma	0–1	Sampdoria	Rome
		Report	Vierchowod 49'	Stadium: Stadio Olimpico; Referee: Angelo Amendolia

20 April 1991 30	Milan	1–1	Roma	Milan
	Agostini 90'	Report	Rizzitelli 87'	Stadium: San Siro; Referee: Carlo Sguizzato

4 May 1991 31	Roma	2–1	Atalanta	Rome
	Bonacina 60' (o.g.); Rizzitelli 90'	Report	Catelli 42'	Stadium: Stadio Olimpico; Referee: Alfredo Trentalange

12 May 1991 32	Cagliari	0–0	Roma	Cagliari
		Report		Stadium: Stadio Sant'Elia; Referee: Pierluigi Magni

18 May 1991 33	Roma	1–1	Napoli	Rome
	Carboni 15'	Report	Rizzardi 80'	Stadium: Stadio Olimpico; Referee: Gianni Beschin

26 May 1991 34	Pisa	0–1	Roma	Pisa
		Report	Muzzi 72'	Stadium: Arena Garibaldi; Referee: Roberto Bettin

=== Coppa Italia ===
==== Second round ====
5 September 1990 1	Roma	1–0	Foggia	Rome
	Völler 9'			Stadium: Stadio Olimpico; Referee: Moreno Frigerio

12 September 1990 2	Foggia	1–3 (1–4 agg.)	Roma	Foggia
	Barone 32' (pen.)		Comi 15'; Rizzitelli 34', 72'	Stadium: Stadio Pino Zaccheria; Referee: Moreno Frigerio

==== Round of 16 ====
14 November 1990 1	Roma	2–0	Genoa	Rome
	Gerolin 41'; Rizzitelli 66'			Stadium: Stadio Olimpico; Referee: Piero Ceccarini

21 November 1990 2	Genoa	1–1 (1–3 agg.)	Roma	Genoa
	Pacione 81'		Völler 75'	Stadium: Stadio Luigi Ferraris; Referee: Fabio Baldas

==== Quarter-finals ====
7 February 1991 1	Roma	1–1	Juventus	Rome
	Bonetti 45' (o.g.)		Casiraghi 56'	Stadium: Stadio Olimpico; Referee: Gianni Beschin

20 February 1991 2	Juventus	0–2 (1–3 agg.)	Roma	Turin
			Berthold 35'; Rizzitelli 44'	Stadium: Stadio delle Alpi; Referee: Arcangelo Pezzella

==== Semi-finals ====
13 March 1991 1	Milan	0–0	Roma	Milan
				Stadium: San Siro; Referee: Fabio Baldas

2 April 1991 2	Roma	1–0 (1–0 agg.)	Milan	Rome
	Van Basten 24' (o.g.)			Stadium: Stadio Olimpico; Referee: Pietro D'Elia

==== Final ====
30 May 1991 1	Roma	3–1	Sampdoria	Rome
	Pellegrini 12' (o.g.); Berthold 35'; Völler 40' (pen.)		Katanec 29'	Stadium: Stadio Olimpico; Referee: Pierluigi Pairetto

9 June 1991 2	Sampdoria	1–1 (2–4 agg.)	Roma	Genoa
	Aldair 79' (o.g.)		Völler 56' (pen.)	Stadium: Stadio Luigi Ferraris; Referee: Arcangelo Pezzella

=== UEFA Cup ===
==== First round ====
19 September 1990 1	Roma (Italy)	1–0	(Portugal) Benfica	Rome, Italy
20:30	Carnevale 1'; Comi (yellow card) 26'; Desideri (yellow card) 42'	Report	Vítor Paneira (yellow card) 32'; Schwarz (yellow card) 71'	Stadium: Stadio Olimpico; Referee: Kurt Röthlisberger (Switzerland)

3 October 1990 2	Benfica (Portugal)	0–1 (0–2 agg.)	(Italy) Roma	Lisbon, Portugal
22:00	Veloso (yellow card) 78'	Report	Carnevale (yellow card) 28'; Giannini 28'; Nela (yellow card) 40'; Carboni (red card) 66'	Stadium: Estádio da Luz; Referee: Aron Schmidhuber (Germany)

==== Second round ====
24 October 1990 1	Valencia (Spain)	1–1	(Italy) Roma	Valencia, Spain
21:00	Penev 24'; Arroyo (yellow card) 39'	Report	Desideri (yellow card) 6'; Piacentini (yellow card) 20'; Rizzitelli 72'	Stadium: Luís Casanova; Attendance: 35,000; Referee: Siegfried Kirschen (East Germany)

7 November 1990 2	Roma (Italy)	2–1 (3–2 agg.)	(Spain) Valencia	Rome, Italy
20:30	Tempestilli (yellow card) 7'; Giannini 36'; Völler 63' (pen.); Salsano (yellow card) 74'	Report	Giner (yellow card) 36'; Voro (yellow card) 78'; Fernando 80' (pen.)	Stadium: Stadio Olimpico; Attendance: 47,825; Referee: Gérard Biguet (France)

==== Third round ====
28 November 1990 1	Roma (Italy)	5–0	(France) Bordeaux	Rome, Italy
20:30	Völler 10', 44' (pen.), 50'; Tempestilli (yellow card) 58'; Gerolin 61', 73'	Report	Sénac (yellow card) 43'	Stadium: Stadio Olimpico; Attendance: 48,699; Referee: John Blankenstein (Netherlands)

12 December 1990 2	Bordeaux (France)	0–2 (0–7 agg.)	(Italy) Roma	Bordeaux, France
20:45	Bell (red card) 29'	Report	Salsano (yellow card) 65'; Völler 73' (pen.); Piacentini (yellow card) 78'; Desideri 90'	Stadium: Stade du Parc Lescure; Referee: Bo Karlsson (Sweden)

==== Quarter-finals ====
6 March 1991 1	Roma (Italy)	3–0	(Belgium) Anderlecht	Rome, Italy
19:00	Desideri 44', (yellow card) 70'; Nela (yellow card) 45'; Völler 73'; Giannini 75'	Report		Stadium: Stadio Olimpico; Referee: George Courtney (England)

20 March 1991 2	Anderlecht (Belgium)	2–3 (2–6 agg.)	(Italy) Roma	Brussels, Belgium
20:00	Kooiman 73'; Lamptey 82'	Report	Völler 24', 57', 70'; Gerolin (yellow card) 72'	Stadium: Constant Vanden Stock Stadium; Referee: Peter Mikkelsen (Denmark)

==== Semi-finals ====
10 April 1991 1	Brøndby (Denmark)	0–0	(Italy) Roma	Brøndby, Denmark
19:00		Report		Stadium: Brøndby Stadium; Referee: Lajos Németh (Hungary)

24 April 1991 2	Roma (Italy)	2–1 (2–1 agg.)	(Denmark) Brøndby	Rome, Italy
19:00	Rizzitelli 33'; Desideri (yellow card) 69'; Völler 88'	Report	Jensen (yellow card) 55'; Olsen (yellow card) 63'; Nela 64' (o.g.); Rasmussen (yellow card) 72'	Stadium: Stadio Olimpico; Referee: Emilio Soriano Aladrén (Spain)

==== Final ====
8 May 1991 1	Internazionale (Italy)	2–0	(Italy) Roma	Milan, Italy
20:30	Matthäus 58' (pen.); Berti 67'; Serena (yellow card) 78'; Baresi (yellow card) 85'	Report	Comi (yellow card) 57'; Aldair (yellow card) 67'; Carboni (yellow card) 85'	Stadium: San Siro; Referee: Alexey Spirin (Soviet Union)

22 May 1991 2	Roma (Italy)	1–0 (1–2 agg.)	(Italy) Internazionale	Rome, Italy
20:30	Tempestilli (yellow card) 39'; Rizzitelli 81'	Report	Klinsmann (yellow card) 74'; Bianchi (yellow card) 83'	Stadium: Stadio Olimpico; Referee: Joël Quiniou (France)

== Statistics ==
=== Players statistics ===
No.	Pos	Nat	Player	Total		Serie A		Coppa		UEFA	
No.	Pos	Nat	Player	Apps	Goals	Apps	Goals	Apps	Goals	Apps	Goals
-	GK	(Italy) ITA	Giovanni Cervone	32	-27	21	-20	5	-2	6	-5
-	DF	(West Germany) FRG	Thomas Berthold	49	3	30	1	7	2	12	0
-	DF	(Italy) ITA	Sebastiano Nela	47	1	27+1	1	8	0	11	0
-	DF	(Brazil) BRA	Aldair	49	2	28+1	2	9	0	11	0
-	DF	(Italy) ITA	Amedeo Carboni	43	1	27+3	1	9	0	4	0
-	MF	(Italy) ITA	Fabrizio Di Mauro	44	2	24+3	2	7	0	10	0
-	MF	(Italy) ITA	Giuseppe Giannini	42	5	23+1	3	8	0	10	2
-	MF	(Italy) ITA	Stefano Desideri	47	5	25+3	3	10	0	9	2
-	MF	(Italy) ITA	Fausto Salsano	43	4	24+5	4	9	0	5	0
-	FW	(West Germany) FRG	Rudi Völler	52	25	30	11	10	4	12	10
-	FW	(Italy) ITA	Ruggiero Rizzitelli	40	13	17+7	5	8	4	8	4
-	GK	(Italy) ITA	Giuseppe Zinetti	19	-19	10	-14	5	-3	4	-2
-	DF	(Italy) ITA	Manuel Gerolin	42	3	18+8	0	7	1	9	2
-	DF	(Italy) ITA	Antonio Tempestilli	37	1	17+5	1	7	0	8	0
-	DF	(Italy) ITA	Antonio Comi	32	1	14+4	0	3	1	11	0
-	DF	(Italy) ITA	Stefano Pellegrini	27	0	14	0	8	0	5	0
-	MF	(Italy) ITA	Giovanni Piacentini	33	0	12+8	0	6	0	7	0
-	FW	(Italy) ITA	Roberto Muzzi	23	3	5+10	3	3	0	5	0
-	FW	(Italy) ITA	Andrea Carnevale	8	5	5	4	1	0	2	1
-	GK	(Italy) ITA	Angelo Peruzzi	5	-3	3	-3	0	0	2	-0
-	DF	(Italy) ITA	Dario Rossi	2	0	0+1	0	0	0	1	0
-	MF	(Italy) ITA	Giampiero Maini	1	0	0+1	0				
-	MF	(Italy) ITA	Bruno Conti	1	0	0	0	1	0		
-	MF	(Italy) ITA	Daniele Berretta								
-	GK	(Italy) ITA	L. Alidori	0	0	0	-0				

- Source: http://calcio-seriea.net/presenze/1990/1010/
