= 1991–92 AS Roma season =

Roma
1991–92 season
- President: Giuseppe Ciarrapico
- Manager: Ottavio Bianchi
- Stadium: Olimpico
- Serie A: 5th (In 1992–93 UEFA Cup)
- Supercoppa Italiana: Runners-up
- Coppa Italia: Quarter-finals
- European Cup Winners' Cup: Quarter-finals
- Top goalscorer: League: Rudi Völler (7); All: Ruggiero Rizzitelli (12)
Home colours	Away colours	Third colours

Associazione Sportiva Roma did not repeat its Coppa Italia victory from the previous season, but retained its status as the top team from the Capital with fifth in the league standings. Roma's main struggle was its inability to seal matches by a close margin, drawing on 14 occasions, and it neither had a watertight defence, nor a fearsome attack. Despite those shortcomings, Roma was only three points behind Torino for third.

== Players ==
Note: Flags indicate national team as defined under FIFA eligibility rules; some limited exceptions apply. Players may hold more than one non-FIFA nationality.

Pos.	Nation	Player
GK	ITA	Giovanni Cervone
GK	ITA	Giuseppe Zinetti
DF	BRA	Aldair
DF	ITA	Antonio Comi
DF	ITA	Marco De Marchi
DF	ITA	Luigi Garzya
DF	ITA	Gabriele Grossi
DF	ITA	Sebastiano Nela
DF	ITA	Stefano Pellegrini
DF	ITA	Dario Rossi
DF	ITA	Antonio Tempestilli

Pos.	Nation	Player
MF	ITA	Walter Bonacina
MF	ITA	Amedeo Carboni
MF	ITA	Fabrizio Di Mauro
MF	ITA	Giuseppe Giannini
MF	GER	Thomas Häßler
MF	ITA	Giovanni Piacentini
MF	ITA	Fausto Salsano
FW	ITA	Andrea Carnevale
FW	ITA	Roberto Muzzi
FW	ITA	Ruggiero Rizzitelli
FW	GER	Rudi Völler

=== Transfers ===
In
Pos.	Name	from	Type
MF	Thomas Hässler	Juventus	
FW	Andrea Carnevale	SSC Napoli	
GK	Ferro Tontini	Cosenza	
DF	Marco De Marchi	Juventus	loan
DF	Luigi Garzya	Lecce	
MF	Walter Bonacina	Atalanta BC	

Out
Pos.	Name	To	Type
DF	Thomas Berthold	Bayern München	
GK	Angelo Peruzzi	Juventus	
GK	Franco Tancredi	Torino	
MF	Stefano Desideri	Internazionale	
GK	Luca Alidori	Chieti	
DF	Manuel Gerolin	Bologna FC	
MF	Bruno Conti	-	retired
MF	Giampiero Maini	Lecce	loan

== Competitions ==
=== Overall ===
Competition	Started round	Final position	First match	Last match
Serie A	Matchday 1	5th	1 September 1991	24 May 1992
Supercoppa Italiana	Final	Runners-up	24 August 1991	
Coppa Italia	Second round	Quarter-finals	28 August 1991	26 February 1992
European Cup Winners' Cup	First round	Quarter-finals	18 September 1991	18 March 1992

Last updated: 24 May 1992

=== Supercoppa Italiana ===
24 August 1991	Sampdoria	1–0	Roma	Genoa
20:30	Mancini 75'			Stadium: Stadio Luigi Ferraris; Attendance: 21,120; Referee: Tullio Lanese

=== Serie A ===
==== League table ====
Pos	Team	Pld	W	D	L	GF	GA	GD	Pts	Qualification or relegation
3	Torino	34	14	15	5	42	20	+22	43	Qualification to UEFA Cup
4	Napoli	34	15	12	7	56	40	+16	42	Qualification to UEFA Cup
5	Roma	34	13	14	7	37	31	+6	40	Qualification to UEFA Cup
6	Sampdoria	34	11	16	7	38	31	+7	38	
7	Parma	34	11	16	7	32	28	+4	38	Qualification to Cup Winners' Cup

Source: 1991–92 Serie A, RSSSF.com
Rules for classification: 1) Points; 2) Head-to-head points; 3) Head-to-head goal difference; 4) Goal difference; 5) Goals scored; 6) Draw.

==== Results summary ====
Overall								Home						Away					
Pld	W	D	L	GF	GA	GD	Pts	W	D	L	GF	GA	GD	W	D	L	GF	GA	GD
34	13	14	7	37	31	+6	53	7	8	2	18	10	+8	6	6	5	19	21	−2

Last updated: 24 May 1992.
Source: Competitive matches

==== Results by round ====
Round	1	2	3	4	5	6	7	8	9	10	11	12	13	14	15	16	17	18	19	20	21	22	23	24	25	26	27	28	29	30	31	32	33	34
Ground	A	H	A	H	A	H	A	H	A	H	H	A	H	A	A	H	A	H	A	H	A	H	A	H	A	H	A	A	H	A	H	H	A	H
Result	W	L	W	D	W	D	D	D	L	D	W	L	D	L	D	W	L	W	D	D	D	L	D	W	W	D	L	D	D	W	W	W	W	W
Result	1	7	4	4	2	2	3	3	8	7	6	7	7	11	10	7	10	8	8	9	8	11	9	8	8	8	9	9	8	6	5	5	5	5

Source: http://calcio-seriea.net/allenatori_squadra/1991/1021/
A = Away; H = Home; W = Win; D = Draw; L = Loss; = 1992–93 European Cup; = 1992–93 UEFA Cup; = 1992–93 Serie B

==== Matches ====
1 September 1991 1	Hellas Verona	0–1	Roma	Verona
		Report	Muzzi 82'	Stadium: Stadio Marc'Antonio Bentegodi; Referee: Pietro D'Elia

8 September 1991 2	Roma	0–1	Internazionale	Rome
		Report	Matthäus 85' (pen.)	Stadium: Stadio Olimpico; Referee: Pierluigi Pairetto

15 September 1991 3	Cagliari	0–1	Roma	Cagliari
		Report	Herrera 80' (o.g.)	Stadium: Stadio Sant'Elia; Referee: Luciano Luci

22 September 1991 4	Roma	0–0	Genoa	Rome
		Report		Stadium: Stadio Olimpico; Referee: Werter Cornieti

29 September 1991 5	Fiorentina	0–1	Roma	Florence
		Report	Salsano 36'	Stadium: Stadio Artemio Franchi; Referee: Fabio Baldas

6 October 1991 6	Roma	1–1	Lazio	Rome
	Rizzitelli 81'	Report	Riedle 65'	Stadium: Stadio Olimpico; Referee: Gianni Beschin

20 October 1991 7	Torino	1–1	Roma	Turin
	Bresciani 23'	Report	Aldair 58'	Stadium: Stadio delle Alpi; Referee: Arcangelo Pezzella

27 October 1991 8	Roma	1–1	Foggia	Rome
	Petrescu 53' (o.g.)	Report	Shalimov 82'	Stadium: Stadio Olimpico; Referee: Mauro Felicani

3 November 1991 9	Milan	4–1	Roma	Milan
	Van Basten 30'; Massaro 36'; Rijkaard 57'; Costacurta 78'	Report	Carnevale 59'	Stadium: San Siro; Referee: Graziano Cesari

17 November 1991 10	Roma	1–1	Napoli	Rome
	Di Mauro 43'	Report	Zola 77'	Stadium: Stadio Olimpico; Referee: Loris Stafoggia

24 November 1991 11	Roma	2–0	Sampdoria	Rome
	Rizzitelli 47'; Giannini 77'	Report		Stadium: Stadio Olimpico; Referee: Arcangelo Pezzella

1 December 1991 12	Juventus	2–1	Roma	Turin
	Schillaci 37'; De Marchi 88' (o.g.)	Report	Giannini 71'	Stadium: Stadio delle Alpi; Referee: Marcello Nicchi

8 December 1991 13	Roma	1–1	Atalanta	Rome
	Bonacina 30'	Report	Piovanelli 52'	Stadium: Stadio Olimpico; Referee: Robert Anthony Boggi

15 December 1991 14	Parma	3–1	Roma	Parma
	Nela 15' (o.g.); Osio 55'; Melli 76'	Report	Di Mauro 12'	Stadium: Stadio Ennio Tardini; Referee: Gianni Beschin

5 January 1992 15	Ascoli	1–1	Roma	Ascoli Piceno
	Giordano 45'	Report	Rizzitelli 53'	Stadium: Stadio Cino e Lillo Del Duca; Referee: Robert Anthony Boggi

12 January 1992 16	Roma	3–0	Cremonese	Rome
	Völler 10', 66'; Aldair 73'	Report		Stadium: Stadio Olimpico; Referee: Giovanni Merlino

19 January 1992 17	Bari	2–1	Roma	Bari
	Platt 68', 86'	Report	Völler 16'	Stadium: Stadio San Nicola; Referee: Luciano Luci

26 January 1992 18	Roma	1–0	Hellas Verona	Rome
	Carnevale 35'	Report		Stadium: Stadio Olimpico; Referee: Fabio Baldas

2 February 1992 19	Internazionale	0–0	Roma	Milan
		Report		Stadium: San Siro; Referee: Mauro Felicani

9 February 1992 20	Roma	0–0	Cagliari	Rome
		Report		Stadium: Stadio Olimpico; Referee: Walter Cinciripini

16 February 1992 21	Genoa	1–1	Roma	Genoa
	Aguilera 45'	Report	Häßler 83'	Stadium: Stadio Luigi Ferraris; Referee: Tullio Lanese

23 February 1992 22	Roma	1–3	Fiorentina	Rome
	Völler 79'	Report	Batistuta 36', 70'; Dunga 90'	Stadium: Stadio Olimpico; Referee: Maurizio Mughetti

1 March 1992 23	Lazio	1–1	Roma	Rome
	Sosa 5'	Report	Häßler 70'	Stadium: Stadio Olimpico; Referee: Loris Stafoggia

8 March 1992 24	Roma	1–0	Torino	Rome
	Pellegrini 88'	Report		Stadium: Stadio Olimpico; Referee: Angelo Amendolia

15 March 1992 25	Foggia	1–2	Roma	Foggia
	Signori 90'	Report	Häßler 19'; Aldair 74'	Stadium: Stadio Pino Zaccheria; Referee: Rosario Lo Bello

29 March 1992 26	Roma	1–1	Milan	Rome
	Rizzitelli 69'	Report	Simone 4'	Stadium: Stadio Olimpico; Referee: Tullio Lanese

5 April 1992 27	Napoli	3–2	Roma	Naples
	Silenzi 47'; Careca 55'; Zola 66'	Report	Corradini 8' (o.g.); Giannini 18'	Stadium: Stadio San Paolo; Referee: Livio Bazzoli

12 April 1992 28	Sampdoria	1–1	Roma	Genoa
	Silas 90'	Report	Giannini 89'	Stadium: Stadio Luigi Ferraris; Referee: Piero Ceccarini

18 April 1992 29	Roma	1–1	Juventus	Rome
	Rizzitelli 57'	Report	R. Baggio 73'	Stadium: Stadio Olimpico; Referee: Luciano Luci

26 April 1992 30	Atalanta	0–1	Roma	Bergamo
		Report	Völler 73'	Stadium: Stadio Atleti Azzurri d'Italia; Referee: Pierluigi Collina

3 May 1992 31	Roma	1–0	Parma	Rome
	Rizzitelli 75'	Report		Stadium: Stadio Olimpico; Referee: Alfredo Trentalange

10 May 1992 32	Roma	1–0	Ascoli	Rome
	Carnevale 88'	Report		Stadium: Stadio Olimpico; Referee: Mauro Felicani

17 May 1992 33	Cremonese	1–2	Roma	Cremona
	Maspero 26'	Report	Völler 23' (pen.); Carnevale 31'	Stadium: Stadio Giovanni Zini; Referee: Carlo Sguizzato

24 May 1992 34	Roma	2–0	Bari	Rome
	Völler 19'; Di Mauro 59'	Report		Stadium: Stadio Olimpico; Referee: Angelo Amendolia

=== Coppa Italia ===
==== Second round ====
28 August 1991 First leg	Roma	1–0	Lucchese	Rome
	Giannini 80'			Stadium: Stadio Olimpico; Referee: Werter Cornieti

3 September 1991 Second leg	Lucchese	1–2 (1–3 agg.)	Roma	Lucca
	Pascucci 55'		Muzzi 32'; Rizzitelli 41'	Stadium: Stadio Porta Elisa; Referee: Fabio Baldas

==== Round of 16 ====
30 October 1991 First leg	Roma	1–0	Napoli	Rome
	Rizzitelli 85' (pen.)			Stadium: Stadio Olimpico; Referee: Tullio Lanese

4 December 1991 Second leg	Napoli	3–2 (3–3a agg.)	Roma	Naples
	Pusceddu 44'; Careca 50', 70'		Rizzitelli 18', 26'	Stadium: Stadio San Paolo; Referee: Rosario Lo Bello

==== Quarter-finals ====
12 February 1992 First leg	Sampdoria	1–0	Roma	Genoa
	Vialli 89'			Stadium: Stadio Luigi Ferraris; Referee: Carlo Sguizzato

26 February 1992 Second leg	Roma	1–1 (1–2 agg.)	Sampdoria	Rome
	Carnevale 23'		Vierchowod 74'	Stadium: Stadio Olimpico; Referee: Pierluigi Pairetto

=== European Cup Winners' Cup ===
==== First round ====
18 September 1991 First leg	CSKA Moscow (Soviet Union)	1–2	(Italy) Roma	Moscow, Soviet Union
	Sergeyev 52'		Fokin 46' (o.g.); Rizzitelli 73'	Stadium: Central Lenin Stadium; Attendance: 50,000; Referee: Bo Karlsson (Sweden)

2 October 1991 Second leg	Roma (Italy)	0–1 (2a–2 agg.)	(Soviet Union) CSKA Moscow	Rome, Italy
			Dmitriev 13'	Stadium: Stadio Olimpico; Attendance: 45,000; Referee: Hubert Forstinger (Austria)

==== Second round ====
23 October 1991 First leg	Ilves (Finland)	1–1	(Italy) Roma	Tampere, Finland
	Czakon 65'		Carnevale 20'	Stadium: Ratinan Stadium

6 November 1991 Second leg	Roma (Italy)	5–2 (6–3 agg.)	(Finland) Ilves	Rome, Italy
	Mattila 1' (o.g.); Rizzitelli 2'; Di Mauro 14'; Carnevale 47', 77'		Czakon 80', 88'	Stadium: Stadio Olimpico

==== Quarter-finals ====
4 March 1992 First leg	Roma (Italy)	0–0	(France) Monaco	Rome, Italy
				Stadium: Stadio Olimpico

18 March 1992 Second leg	Monaco (France)	1–0 (1–0 agg.)	(Italy) Roma	Monaco
	Barros 45'			Stadium: Stade Louis II

== Statistics ==
=== Players statistics ===
No.	Pos	Nat	Player	Total		1991–92 Serie A		1991–92 Coppa Italia		1991–92 UEFA Cup	
No.	Pos	Nat	Player	Apps	Goals	Apps	Goals	Apps	Goals	Apps	Goals
-	GK	(Italy) ITA	Giovanni Cervone	31	-26	21	-21	6	0	4	-5
-	DF	(Italy) ITA	Sebastiano Nela	39	0	26+1	0	6	0	6	0
-	DF	(Brazil) BRA	Aldair	42	3	33	3	3	0	6	0
-	DF	(Italy) ITA	Luigi Garzya	30	0	19+4	0	3	0	4	0
-	DF	(Italy) ITA	Amedeo Carboni	44	0	33	0	5	0	6	0
-	MF	(Italy) ITA	Walter Bonacina	37	1	28	1	5	0	4	0
-	MF	(Italy) ITA	Fabrizio Di Mauro	35	4	26	3	3	0	6	1
-	MF	(Germany) GER	Thomas Häßler	43	3	32	3	5	0	6	0
-	MF	(Italy) ITA	Giuseppe Giannini	31	5	22+2	4	3	1	4	0
-	FW	(Italy) ITA	Ruggiero Rizzitelli	35	12	24+2	6	4	4	5	2
-	FW	(Germany) GER	Rudi Völler	36	7	29+1	7	2	0	4	0
-	GK	(Italy) ITA	Giuseppe Zinetti	16	-11	13+1	-10	0	0	2	-1
-	MF	(Italy) ITA	Giovanni Piacentini	33	0	19+6	0	5	0	3	0
-	FW	(Italy) ITA	Andrea Carnevale	28	8	10+11	4	4	1	3	3
-	DF	(Italy) ITA	Antonio Comi	13	0	10	0	2	0	1	0
-	DF	(Italy) ITA	Marco De Marchi	18	0	10	0	4	0	4	0
-	MF	(Italy) ITA	Fausto Salsano	29	1	5+15	1	6	0	3	0
-	DF	(Italy) ITA	Stefano Pellegrini	19	1	5+7	1	5	0	2	0
-	DF	(Italy) ITA	Antonio Tempestilli	9	0	5+1	0	2	0	1	0
-	FW	(Italy) ITA	Roberto Muzzi	13	2	3+7	1	2	1	1	0
-	GK	(Italy) ITA	Ferro Tontini	0	0	0	-0	0	0	0	-0
-	DF	(Italy) ITA	Gabriele Grossi	0	0	0	0				
-	DF	(Italy) ITA	Dario Rossi	0	0	0	0				

- Source: http://calcio-seriea.net/presenze/1991/1033/
