= 1989–90 AS Roma season =

Roma
1989–90 season
- President: Dino Viola
- Manager: Luigi Radice
- Stadium: Stadio Olimpico
- Serie A: 6th
- Coppa Italia: Semi-finals
- Top goalscorer: League: Rudi Völler (14); All: Rudi Völler (16)
Home colours	Away colours

Associazione Sportiva Roma had a rather average season, but finished solidly inside the top half of Serie A with a sixth place. German striker Rudi Völler had his best season at Roma, scoring 14 league goals, whilst Stefano Desideri hit 10 goals. The greatest success of Roma's season was the Primavera team winning the national championship.

== Squad ==
Note: Flags indicate national team as defined under FIFA eligibility rules; some limited exceptions apply. Players may hold more than one non-FIFA nationality.

Pos.	Nation	Player
GK	ITA	Franco Tancredi
GK	ITA	Giovanni Cervone
GK	ITA	Ferro Tontini
DF	ITA	Antonio Comi
DF	ITA	Sebastiano Nela
DF	FRG	Thomas Berthold
DF	ITA	Lionello Manfredonia
DF	ITA	Manuel Gerolin
DF	ITA	Antonio Tempestilli
DF	ITA	Stefano Pellegrini
DF	ITA	Fabio Petruzzi
MF	ITA	Bruno Conti

Pos.	Nation	Player
MF	ITA	Fabrizio Di Mauro
MF	ITA	Stefano Desideri
MF	ITA	Giuseppe Giannini
MF	ITA	Alessandro Cucciari
MF	ITA	Stefano Impallomeni
MF	ITA	Giovanni Piacentini
MF	ITA	Giampiero Maini
FW	ITA	Francesco Statuto
FW	ITA	Ruggiero Rizzitelli
FW	FRG	Rudi Völler
FW	ITA	Paolo Baldieri
FW	ITA	Roberto Muzzi

== Competitions ==
=== Serie A ===
==== League table ====
Pos	Team	Pld	W	D	L	GF	GA	GD	Pts	Qualification or relegation
4	Juventus	34	15	14	5	56	36	+20	44	Qualification to Cup Winners' Cup
5	Sampdoria (Note: Sampdoria qualified for the 1990–91 European Cup Winners' Cup as defending champions.)	34	16	11	7	46	26	+20	43	Qualification to Cup Winners' Cup
6	Roma	34	14	13	7	45	40	+5	41	Qualification to UEFA Cup
7	Atalanta	34	12	11	11	36	43	−7	35	Qualification to UEFA Cup
8	Bologna	34	9	16	9	29	36	−7	34	Qualification to UEFA Cup

Source: 1989–90 Serie A, RSSSF.com
Rules for classification: 1) Points; 2) Head-to-head points; 3) Head-to-head goal difference; 4) Goal difference; 5) Goals scored; 6) Draw.

==== Results summary ====
Overall								Home						Away					
Pld	W	D	L	GF	GA	GD	Pts	W	D	L	GF	GA	GD	W	D	L	GF	GA	GD
34	14	13	7	45	40	+5	55	8	7	2	26	18	+8	6	6	5	19	22	−3

Last updated: 29 April 1990.
Source: Competitive matches

==== Results by round ====
Round	1	2	3	4	5	6	7	8	9	10	11	12	13	14	15	16	17	18	19	20	21	22	23	24	25	26	27	28	29	30	31	32	33	34
Ground	A	H	A	H	A	H	A	H	A	H	A	H	A	A	H	H	A	H	A	H	A	H	A	H	A	H	A	H	A	H	H	A	A	H
Result	D	D	W	W	W	W	L	D	L	W	L	D	D	W	W	W	D	W	D	L	L	W	D	D	L	L	W	D	W	W	D	W	D	D
Position	7	6	4	3	2	1	3	4	5	4	5	6	7	5	3	2	3	3	4	5	6	6	6	6	6	6	6	6	6	6	6	6	6	6

Source: Competitive matches
A = Away; H = Home; W = Win; D = Draw; L = Loss; = 1990–91 European Cup; = 1990–91 UEFA Cup; = Relegation to 1990–91 Serie B

==== Matches ====
27 August 1989 1	Udinese	1–1	Roma	Udine
	Simonini 45'	Report	Tempestilli 32'	Stadium: Stadio Friuli; Referee: Luciano Luci

3 September 1989 2	Roma	0–0	Ascoli	Rome
		Report		Stadium: Flaminio; Referee: Bruno Di Cola

6 September 1989 3	Genoa	0–2	Roma	Genoa
		Report	Völler 60' (pen.), 84'	Stadium: Stadio Luigi Ferraris; Referee: Werter Cornieti

10 September 1989 4	Roma	4–1	Atalanta	Rome
	Desideri 14'; Gerolin 17'; Berthold 28'; Völler 52'	Report	Caniggia 9'	Stadium: Flaminio; Referee: Pierluigi Pairetto

17 September 1989 5	Bari	1–2	Roma	Bari
	João Paulo 7'	Report	Brambati 54' (o.g.); Desideri 80'	Stadium: Stadio San Nicola; Referee: Luciano Luci

24 September 1989 6	Roma	1–0	Cesena	Rome
	Desideri 62'	Report		Stadium: Flaminio; Referee: Gianni Beschin

1 October 1989 7	Internazionale	3–0	Roma	Milan
	Matthäus 27', 58'; Brehme 38'	Report		Stadium: Giuseppe Meazza; Referee: Rosario Lo Bello

8 October 1989 8	Roma	1–1	Napoli	Rome
	Comi 10'	Report	Maradona 55' (pen.)	Stadium: Flaminio; Referee: Pierluigi Magni

22 October 1989 9	Milan	1–0	Roma	Milan
	Van Basten 81'	Report		Stadium: San Siro; Referee: Pietro D'Elia

29 October 1989 10	Roma	2–1	Lecce	Rome
	Giannini 27'; Rizzitelli 40'	Report	Levanto 83'	Stadium: Flaminio; Referee: Mauro Felicani

5 November 1989 11	Sampdoria	4–2	Roma	Genoa
	Salsano 24'; Mancini 43'; Vialli 55', 86'	Report	Desideri 48'; Rizzitelli 73'	Stadium: Stadio Luigi Ferraris; Referee: Pierluigi Pairetto

19 November 1989 12	Roma	1–1	Lazio	Rome
	Giannini 83'	Report	Bertoni 65'	Stadium: Flaminio; Referee: Pietro D'Elia

26 November 1989 13	Hellas Verona	2–2	Roma	Verona
	Pusceddu 53'; Pellegrini 62'	Report	Völler 65'; Desideri 67'	Stadium: Stadio Marc'Antonio Bentegodi; Referee: Fabio Baldas

3 December 1989 14	Fiorentina	1–2	Roma	Florence
	Battistini 55'	Report	Desideri 7'; Rizzitelli 44'	Stadium: Stadio Artemio Franchi; Referee: Gianni Beschin

10 December 1989 15	Roma	3–2	Cremonese	Rome
	Desideri 34'; Völler 44', 49' (pen.)	Report	Bonomi 35'; Piccioni 39'	Stadium: Flaminio; Referee: Werter Cornieti

17 December 1989 16	Roma	1–0	Juventus	Rome
	Desideri 68'	Report		Stadium: Flaminio; Referee: Luigi Agnolin

30 December 1989 17	Bologna	1–1	Roma	Bologna
	Nela 51' (o.g.)	Report	Rizzitelli 89'	Stadium: Stadio Renato Dall'Ara; Referee: Pietro D'Elia

7 January 1990 18	Roma	3–1	Udinese	Rome
	Berthold 16'; Völler 74'; Rizzitelli 90'	Report	Balbo 84'	Stadium: Flaminio; Referee: Luciano Luci

14 January 1990 19	Ascoli	1–1	Roma	Ascoli Piceno
	Casagrande 21'	Report	Tempestilli 46'	Stadium: Stadio Cino e Lillo Del Duca; Referee: Fabio Baldas

17 January 1990 20	Roma	0–1	Genoa	Rome
		Report	Aguilera 15'	Stadium: Flaminio; Referee: Marcello Nicchi

21 January 1990 21	Atalanta	3–0	Roma	Bergamo
	Bonacina 22'; Bortolazzi 79'; Caniggia 89'	Report		Stadium: Stadio Atleti Azzurri d'Italia; Referee: Gianni Beschin

28 January 1990 22	Roma	1–0	Bari	Rome
	Gerolin 76'	Report		Stadium: Flaminio; Referee: Luciano Luci

4 February 1990 23	Cesena	0–0	Roma	Cesena
		Report		Stadium: Stadio Dino Manuzzi; Referee: Fabio Baldas

11 February 1990 24	Roma	1–1	Internazionale	Rome
	Tempestilli 50'	Report	Klinsmann 10'	Stadium: Flaminio; Referee: Rosario Lo Bello

18 February 1990 25	Napoli	3–1	Roma	Naples
	Maradona 53' (pen.), 72' (pen.); Careca 62'	Report	Nela 4'	Stadium: Stadio San Paolo; Referee: Luciano Luci

25 February 1990 26	Roma	0–4	Milan	Rome
		Report	Tempestilli 34' (o.g.); Van Basten 39', 57'; Massaro 89'	Stadium: Flaminio; Referee: Pierluigi Pairetto

4 March 1990 27	Lecce	0–2	Roma	Lecce
		Report	Gerolin 7'; Völler 13'	Stadium: Stadio Via del Mare; Referee: Gianni Beschin

11 March 1990 28	Roma	1–1	Sampdoria	Rome
	Conti 34'	Report	Vierchowod 78'	Stadium: Flaminio; Referee: Loris Stafoggia

18 March 1990 29	Lazio	0–1	Roma	Rome
		Report	Völler 30'	Stadium: Flaminio; Referee: Fabio Baldas

25 March 1990 30	Roma	5–2	Hellas Verona	Rome
	Conti 16'; Völler 27', 58'; Desideri 73', 76'	Report	Gerolin 79' (o.g.); Pusceddu 87'	Stadium: Flaminio; Referee: Moreno Frigerio

8 April 1990 31	Roma	0–0	Fiorentina	Rome
		Report		Stadium: Flaminio; Referee: Rosario Lo Bello

14 April 1990 32	Cremonese	0–1	Roma	Cremona
		Report	Völler 81'	Stadium: Stadio Giovanni Zini; Referee: Luigi Agnolin

22 April 1990 33	Juventus	1–1	Roma	Turin
	Casiraghi 68'	Report	Völler 64'	Stadium: Stadio Olimpico di Torino; Referee: Gianni Beschin

29 April 1990 34	Roma	2–2	Bologna	Rome
	Völler 5'; Giannini 20'	Report	Galvani 3'; Waas 48'	Stadium: Flaminio; Referee: Loris Stafoggia

=== Coppa Italia ===
==== First round ====
24 August 1989	Roma	3–0	Modena	Terni
20:40	Desideri 34'; Rizzitelli 37'; Völler 50'	Report		Stadium: Stadio Libero Liberati; Attendance: 18,000; Referee: Pierluigi Pairetto

==== Second round ====
30 August 1989	Roma	4–0	Palermo	Terni
20:30	Völler 15'; Giannini 27'; Rizzitelli 55', 73'	Report		Stadium: Stadio Libero Liberati; Attendance: 10,305; Referee: Virginio Quartuccio

==== Group phase-Group A ====
3 January 1990 1	Roma	3–0	Ascoli	Rome
14:30	Di Mauro 14'; Desideri 24'; Giannini 37'	Report		Stadium: Flaminio; Attendance: 20,000; Referee: Virginio Quartuccio

24 January 1990 3	Internazionale	3–1	Roma	Milan
14:30	Serena 26', 68'; Matthäus 80' (pen.)	Report	Di Mauro 59'	Stadium: San Siro; Attendance: 13,567; Referee: Angelo Amendolia

==== Semi-finals ====
31 January 1990 First leg	Juventus	2–0	Roma	Turin
14:30	Casiraghi 5', 84'	Report		Stadium: Comunale; Attendance: 12,844; Referee: Carlo Sguizzato

14 February 1990 Second leg	Roma	3–2 (3–4 agg.)	Juventus	Rome
14:30	Di Mauro 9'; Bonetti 27' (o.g.); Tempestilli 73'	Report	Alessio 51'; Schillaci 64'	Stadium: Flaminio; Attendance: 22,461; Referee: Luigi Agnolin

== Statistics ==
=== Players statistics ===
No.	Pos	Nat	Player	Total		1989–90 Serie A		1989–90 Coppa Italia	
No.	Pos	Nat	Player	Apps	Goals	Apps	Goals	Apps	Goals
-	GK	(Italy) ITA	Giovanni Cervone	33	-43	27	-36	6	-7
-	DF	(West Germany) FRG	Thomas Berthold	38	2	32	2	6	0
-	DF	(Italy) ITA	Sebastiano Nela	36	1	30	1	6	0
-	DF	(Italy) ITA	Antonio Comi	37	1	31	1	6	0
-	DF	(Italy) ITA	Antonio Tempestilli	34	4	27+1	3	6	1
-	MF	(Italy) ITA	Fabrizio Di Mauro	34	3	27+1	0	6	3
-	MF	(Italy) ITA	Manuel Gerolin	29	3	23+1	3	5	0
-	MF	(Italy) ITA	Stefano Desideri	32	12	24+2	10	6	2
-	MF	(Italy) ITA	Giuseppe Giannini	36	5	31	3	5	2
-	FW	(Italy) ITA	Ruggiero Rizzitelli	40	8	33+1	5	6	3
-	FW	(West Germany) FRG	Rudi Völler	38	16	32	14	6	2
-	GK	(Italy) ITA	Franco Tancredi	7	-4	7	-4	0	-0
-	DF	(Italy) ITA	Lionello Manfredonia	17	0	15	0	2	0
-	MF	(Italy) ITA	Bruno Conti	22	2	13+8	2	1	0
-	DF	(Italy) ITA	Stefano Pellegrini	23	0	11+7	0	5	0
-	MF	(Italy) ITA	Giovanni Piacentini	17	0	8+8	0	1	0
-	FW	(Italy) ITA	Paolo Baldieri	12	0	2+9	0	1	0
-	MF	(Italy) ITA	Alessandro Cucciari	7	0	1+5	0	1	0
-	MF	(Italy) ITA	Stefano Impallomeni	6	0	0+5	0	1	0
-	GK	(Italy) ITA	Ferro Tontini	1	0	0+1	-0		
-	DF	(Italy) ITA	Fabio Petruzzi	1	0	0+1	0		
-	FW	(Italy) ITA	Roberto Muzzi	1	0	0+1	0		

- Source: http://calcio-seriea.net/presenze/1989/997/
