= 1988–89 AS Roma season =

Roma
1988–89 season
- President: Dino Viola
- Manager: Nils Liedholm; Luciano Spinosi
- Stadium: Stadio Olimpico
- Serie A: 7th
- Coppa Italia: Second round
- UEFA Cup: Third round
- Top goalscorer: League: Rudi Völler (10); All: Rudi Völler (15)
Home colours	Away colours

Associazione Sportiva Roma finished 7th in Serie A, dropping four places from the season before, even firing coach Nils Liedholm for just a few weeks. It also crashed out of the UEFA Cup against comparatively minnows Dynamo Dresden in the Last 16.

== Players ==
=== Goalkeepers ===
- (Italy) Franco Tancredi
- (Italy) Angelo Peruzzi

=== Defenders ===
- (Italy) Fulvio Collovati
- (Italy) Emidio Oddi
- (Italy) Sebastiano Nela
- (Italy) Moreno Ferrario
- (Italy) Lionello Manfredonia
- (Italy) Manuel Gerolin
- (Italy) Antonio Tempestilli

=== Midfielders ===
- (Brazil) Andrade
- (Italy) Bruno Conti
- (Italy) Fabrizio Di Mauro
- (Italy) Stefano Desideri
- (Italy) Giuseppe Giannini
- (Italy) Roberto Policano
- (Brazil) Renato

=== Forwards ===
- (Italy) Daniele Massaro
- (Italy) Ruggiero Rizzitelli
- (Germany) Rudi Völler

== Competitions ==
=== Serie A ===
==== League table ====
Pos	Team	Pld	W	D	L	GF	GA	GD	Pts	Qualification or relegation
6	Atalanta	34	11	14	9	37	32	+5	36	Qualification to UEFA Cup
7	Fiorentina (Note: AC Fiorentina won the UEFA Cup qualification match against AS Roma then qualified to 1989–90 UEFA Cup.)	34	12	10	12	44	43	+1	34	Qualification to UEFA Cup
8	Roma	34	11	12	11	33	40	−7	34	
9	Lecce	34	8	15	11	25	35	−10	31	
10	Lazio	34	5	19	10	23	32	−9	29	

Source: 1988–89 Serie A, RSSSF.com
Rules for classification: 1) Points; 2) Head-to-head points; 3) Head-to-head goal difference; 4) Goal difference; 5) Goals scored; 6) Draw.

==== Matches ====
9 October 1988 1	Pescara	0–0	Roma	Pescara
15:00		Report		Stadium: Adriatico; Referee: Baldas

16 October 1988 2	Bologna	0–1	Roma	Bologna
14:30		Report	Desideri 87'	Stadium: Renato Dall'Ara; Attendance: 22 000; Referee: Lo Bello

23 October 1988 3	Roma	1–1	Lecce	Rome
14:30	Rizzitelli 69'	Report	Pasculli 87'	Stadium: Olimpico; Attendance: 22 000; Referee: Cornieti

30 October 1988 4	Inter	2–0	Roma	Milan
14:30	Berti 19'; Serena 84'	Report		Stadium: Stadio Giuseppe Meazza; Attendance: 55.000; Referee: Pairetto

6 November 1988 5	Roma	2–1	Pisa	Rome
14:30	Rizzitelli 25'; Tempestilli 69'	Report	Faccenda 40'	Stadium: Olimpico; Attendance: 38 000; Referee: Sguizzato

20 November 1988 6	Cesena	1–1	Roma	Cesena
14:30	Agostini 87'	Report	Nela 64'	Stadium: Stadio Dino Manuzzi; Attendance: 20.000; Referee: Pezzella

27 November 1988 7	Roma	1–3	Torino	Rome
14:30	Policano 75'	Report	Edu 26'; Fuser 71, 83'	Stadium: Olimpico; Attendance: 32.000; Referee: Magni

4 December 1988 8	Sampdoria	0–2	Roma	Genoa
		Report	Völler 35'; Massaro 77'	Stadium: Stadio Luigi Ferraris; Attendance: 18.000; Referee: Amendolia

11 December 1988 9	Roma	1–0	Como	Rome
	Giannini 21'	Report		Stadium: Olimpico; Attendance: 27.000; Referee: Beschin

18 December 1988 10	Ascoli	0–3	Roma	Ascoli Piceno
		Report	Nela 52'; Massaro 80'; Policano 89'	Stadium: Stadio Cino e Lillo Del Duca; Attendance: 9.000; Referee: Pairetto

31 December 1988 11	Roma	1–0	Napoli	Rome
	Völler 87'	Report		Stadium: Olimpico; Attendance: 39.000; Referee: Agnolin

8 January 1989 12	Roma	1–3	Juventus	Rome
	Giannini 84' (pen.)	Report	Altobelli 12'; Rui Barros 78'; Cabrini 90' (pen.)	Stadium: Olimpico; Attendance: 49.000; Referee: Baldas

15 January 1989 13	Lazio	1–0	Roma	Rome
14:30	Di Canio 25'	Report		Stadium: Stadio Olimpico; Attendance: 45 000; Referee: D'Elia

22 January 1989 14	Roma	1–3	Milan	Rome
	Völler 11'	Report	Tassotti 7' van Basten 30'; Virdis 79'	Stadium: Olimpico; Attendance: 41.000; Referee: Lanese

29 January 1989 15	Fiorentina	2–2	Roma	Florence
14:30	Borgonovo 41, 72'	Report	Massaro 3'; Conti 30'	Stadium: Stadio Artemio Franchi; Attendance: 22.000; Referee: Lo Bello

5 February 1989 16	Roma	0–0	Verona	Rome
15:00		Report		Stadium: Olimpico; Attendance: 30.000; Referee: Amendolia

12 February 1989 17	Atalanta	2–2	Roma	Bergamo
15:00	Evair 45'; Madonna 88'	Report	Massaro 3'; Völler 19'	Stadium: Stadio Comunale; Attendance: 23 000; Referee: Sguizzato

18 February 1989 18	Roma	1–3	Pescara	Rome
	Giannini 62' (pen.)	Report	Tita 45'; Tita 55'; Tita 70'	Stadium: Olimpico; Attendance: 41.000; Referee: Luci

26 February 1989 19	Roma	1–1	Bologna	Rome
	Völler 9'	Report	De Marchi 67'	Stadium: Olimpico; Attendance: 29 000; Referee: Paparesta

5 March 1989 20	Lecce	0–0	Roma	Lecce
		Report		Stadium: Stadio Via del Mare; Attendance: 18.000; Referee: Pairetto

12 March 1989 21	Roma	0–3	Inter	Rome
		Report	Matthäus 12'; Serena 22'; Díaz 75'	Stadium: Stadio Olimpico; Attendance: 58.000; Referee: Lanese

19 March 1989 22	Pisa	1–0	Roma	Pisa
15:00	Boccafresca 3'	Report		Stadium: Arena Garibaldi; Attendance: 18.000; Referee: D'Elia

2 April 1989 23	Roma	1–0	Cesena	Rome
	Völler 54'	Report		Stadium: Stadio Olimpico; Attendance: 35.000; Referee: Pezzella

9 April 1989 24	Torino	3–1	Roma	Turin
15:30	Müller 31, 83'; Fuser 68'	Report	Völler 53'	Stadium: Comunale; Attendance: 27.000; Referee: Paparesta

16 April 1989 25	Roma	1–0	Sampdoria	Rome
15:30	Desideri 59'	Report		Stadium: Stadio Olimpico; Attendance: 35.000; Referee: Magni

30 April 1989 26	Como	0–1	Roma	Como
		Report	Manfredonia 2'	Stadium: Giuseppe Sinigaglia; Attendance: 8.000; Referee: Luci

7 May 1989 27	Roma	1–1	Ascoli	Rome
16:00	Policano 40'	Report	Giordano 57'	Stadium: Stadio Olimpico; Attendance: 35.000; Referee: Lanese

14 May 1989 28	Napoli	1–1	Roma	Naples
18:45	Careca 58'	Report	Völler 74'	Stadium: San Paolo; Referee: Lo Bello

21 May 1989 29	Juventus	2–1	Roma	Turin
16:00	Manfredonia 23' (o.g.); Magrin 84' (pen.)	Report	Giannini 28' (pen.)	Stadium: Comunale; Attendance: 23 000; Referee: Cornieti

28 May 1989 30	Roma	0–0	Lazio	Rome
16:30		Report		Stadium: Olimpico; Attendance: 60 000; Referee: D'Elia

4 June 1989 31	Milan	4–1	Roma	Milan
16:30	Tassotti 3'; Tempestilli o.g.' van Basten 56'; Baresi 83'	Report	Massaro 41'	Stadium: San Siro; Attendance: 60 000; Referee: Nicchi

11 June 1989 32	Roma	2–1	Fiorentina	Rome
16:30	Giannini 36'; Völler 87'	Report	Borgonovo 33'	Stadium: Flaminio; Attendance: 24 000; Referee: Frigerio

18 June 1989 33	Verona	0–0	Roma	Verona
17:00		Report		Stadium: Stadio Marcantonio Bentegodi; Attendance: 18 000; Referee: Magni

25 June 1989 34	Roma	2–1	Atalanta	Rome
17:00	Giannini 43'; Völler 66'	Report	Madonna 7' (pen.)	Stadium: Flaminio; Attendance: 27 000; Referee: Amendolia

=== Coppa Italia ===
First round - Group 5

21 August 1988 1	Prato	1–3	Roma	Prato
20:45	Labadini 41' (pen.)	Report	27' Völler; 38' Renato; 57' Conti	Stadium: Stadio Lungobisenzio; Attendance: 5,000; Referee: Frigeri

24 August 1988 2	Empoli	2–3	Roma	Empoli
20:45	Baiano 46'; Cristiani 83'		7' Völler; 53' Conti; 60' Renato	Stadium: Stadio Carlo Castellani; Referee: Lo Bello (Siracusa)

28 August 1988 3	Monza	2–1	Roma	Monza
17:30	Casiraghi 22'; Mancuso 60'	Report	40' Giannini	Stadium: Stadio Brianteo; Attendance: circa 15,000; Referee: Pezzella (Frattamaggiore)

31 August 1988 4	Roma	2–0	Como	Roma
18:15	Giannini 44' (pen.); Rizzitelli 62'	Report		Stadium: Stadio Flaminio; Attendance: 16,176; Referee: Pairetto (Turin)

3 September 1988 5	Roma	5–2	Piacenza	Roma
16:45	Conti 50'; Rizzitelli 54', 58', 68'; Renato 88'	Report	25' Madonna; 79' Scaglia	Stadium: Stadio Flaminio; Attendance: 15,592; Referee: Paparesta (Bari)

Second Round - Group 3

14 September 1988 1	Pisa	3–1	Roma	Pisa
20:30	Severeyns 50'; Piovanelli 57'; Been 85' (pen.)	Report	73' (pen.) Giannini	Stadium: Stadio Arena Garibaldi; Attendance: circa 10,000; Referee: D'Elia (Salerno)

21 September 1988 2	Ancona	1–0	Roma	Ancona
20:30	Spigarelli 78'	Report		Stadium: Stadio Dorico; Referee: Magni (Bergamo)

28 September 1988 3	Roma	4–1	Pescara	Roma
20:30	Policano 13'; Völler 27'; Giannini 55'; Tempestilli 66'	Report	29' Júnior	Stadium: Stadio Flaminio; Attendance: 11,423; Referee: Paparesta (Bari)

=== UEFA Cup ===
First round

7 September 1988 First leg	Roma (Italy)	1–2	(West Germany) Nürnberg	Rome
16:45 CET	Desideri 48'	Report	Sané 44'; Eckstein 59'	Stadium: Stadio Flaminio; Referee: José Rosa dos Santos (Portugal)

12 October 1988 Second leg	Nürnberg (West Germany)	1–3 (3–4 agg.)	(Italy) Roma	Nürnberg
20:00 CET	Eckstein 20'	Report	Völler 9'; Policano 34'; Renato 93'	Stadium: Frankenstadion; Referee: Valeri Butenko (Soviet Union)

Second round

26 October 1988 First leg	Partizan (Socialist Federal Republic of Yugoslavia)	4–2	(Italy) Roma	Belgrade
17:00 CET	Đukić 17', 77'; Vermezović 31'; Milojević 54'	Report	Conti 10', 68'	Stadium: Partizan Stadium; Referee: Lajos Hartmann (Hungary)

7 September 1988 Second leg	Roma (Italy)	2–0 (4a–4 agg.)	(Socialist Federal Republic of Yugoslavia) Partizan	Rome
16:45 CET	Völler 20'; Giannini 71'	Report		Stadium: Olimpico; Referee: Victoriano Sánchez Arminio (Spain)

Third round

23 November 1988 First leg	Dynamo Dresden (East Germany)	2–0	(Italy) Roma	Dresden
17:00 CET	Gütschow 15' (pen.); Minge 81'	Report		Stadium: Rudolf-Harbig-Stadion; Referee: Gérard Biguet (France)

7 December 1988 Second leg	Roma (Italy)	0–2 (0–4 agg.)	(East Germany) Dynamo Dresden	Rome
13:00 CET		Report	Gütschow 69'; Kirsten 80'	Stadium: Olimpico; Referee: Helmut Kohl (Austria)

== Statistics ==
=== Goalscorers ===
- (Germany) Rudi Völler 10
- (Italy) Giuseppe Giannini 6 (3)
- (Italy) Daniele Massaro 5
- (Italy) Roberto Policano 3
