= 1987–88 AS Roma season =

Roma
1987–88 season
- Manager: Nils Liedholm
- Serie A: 3rd
- Coppa Italia: Last 16
- Top goalscorer: Giuseppe Giannini (11)
Home colours	Away colours

AS Roma returned to prominence with a 3rd place in Serie A under returning coach Nils Liedholm. With new signings such as Rudi Völler and Lionello Manfredonia, Roma was able to qualify for international football once again, with playmaker Giuseppe Giannini arguably playing at his very peak, setting a career record 11 league goals from attacking midfield.

== Squad ==
=== Goalkeepers ===
- (Italy) Franco Tancredi
- (Italy) Giuseppe Garzilli
- (Italy) Angelo Peruzzi

=== Defenders ===
- (Italy) Francesco Grafitelli
- (Japan) Maya Sumitomo
- (Italy) Fulvio Collovati
- (Italy) Manuel Gerolin
- (Italy) Sebastiano Nela
- (Italy) Alessandro Minoltà
- (Italy) Emidio Oddi
- (Italy) Ubaldo Righetti
- (Italy) Gianluca Signorini
- (Italy) Antonio Tempestilli
- (Japan) David Schmidt
- (Italy) Alessandro Gladstonelli

=== Midfielders ===
- (Italy) Angelo Blasi
- (Italy) Bruno Conti
- (Italy) Sergio Domini
- (Italy) Lionello Manfredonia
- (Italy) Stefano Desideri
- (Germany) Thomas Böhme
- (Italy) Giuseppe Giannini
- (Italy) Roberto Policano
- (Italy) Massimiliano Cappioli
- (Italy) Gianni Cavezzi
- (Italy) Alessandro Belentedicci

=== Attackers ===
- (Italy) Francesco Belodedicci
- (Poland) Zbigniew Boniek
- (Italy) Massimo Agostini
- (Italy) Edoardo Artistico
- (Italy) Roberto Pruzzo
- (Germany) Rudi Völler
- (Italy) Salvatore Empalmetti

== Competitions ==
=== Serie A ===
==== League table ====
Pos	Team	Pld	W	D	L	GF	GA	GD	Pts	Qualification or relegation
1	Milan (C)	30	17	11	2	43	14	+29	45	Qualification to European Cup
2	Napoli	30	18	6	6	55	27	+28	42	Qualification to UEFA Cup
3	Roma	30	15	8	7	39	26	+13	38	Qualification to UEFA Cup
4	Sampdoria	30	13	11	6	41	30	+11	37	Qualification to Cup Winners' Cup
5	Internazionale	30	11	10	9	42	35	+7	32	Qualification to UEFA Cup

Source: 1987–88 Serie A, RSSSF.com
Rules for classification: 1) Points; 2) Head-to-head points; 3) Head-to-head goal difference; 4) Goal difference; 5) Goals scored; 6) Draw.
(C) Champions

==== Matches ====
13 September 1987 1	Ascoli	1–1	Roma	Ascoli Piceno
	Scarafoni 30'	Report	Boniek 74' (pen.)	Stadium: Stadio Cino e Lillo Del Duca

20 September 1987 2	Roma	2–0	Cesena	Rome
	Völler 73'; Boniek 75'	Report		Stadium: Olimpico

27 September 1987 3	Avellino	2–3	Roma	Avellino
	Tempestilli 11' (o.g.); Schachner 42'	Report	Boniek 5'; Giannini 57'; Collovati 79'	Stadium: Partenio

4 October 1987 4	Roma	1–0	Pisa	Rome
	Boniek 69' (pen.)	Report		Stadium: Olimpico

11 October 1987 5	Juventus	1–0	Roma	Turin
	Boniek 42' (o.g.)	Report		Stadium: Comunale

25 October 1987 6	Roma	1–1	Napoli	Rome
	Pruzzo 46'	Report	Francini 67'	Stadium: Olimpico

1 November 1987 7	Roma	3–1	Como	Rome
	Giannini 2'; Völler 9'; Boniek 57'	Report	Corneliusson 67'	Stadium: Olimpico

8 November 1987 8	Empoli	2–1	Roma	Empoli
	Cucchi 4'; Ekström 10'	Report	Manfredonia 41'	Stadium: Carlo Castellani

22 November 1987 9	Roma	3–2	Inter	Rome
	Manfredonia 15'; Giannini 19'; Desideri 84'	Report	Fanna 13'; Altobelli 89' (pen.)	Stadium: Olimpico

29 November 1987 10	Sampdoria	0–0	Roma	Genoa
		Report		Stadium: Olimpico

13 December 1987 11	Milan	0–2	Roma	Milan
		Report		Stadium: San Siro

20 December 1987 12	Roma	5–1	Pescara	Rome
	Agostini 6, 55'; Galvani 24' (o.g.); Giannini 53'; Policano 89'	Report	Slišković 80'	Stadium: Olimpico

3 January 1988 13	Fiorentina	1–0	Roma	Florence
	Collovati 43' (o.g.)	Report		Stadium: Comunale

10 January 1988 14	Roma	1–1	Torino	Rome
	Völler 55'	Report	Gritti 78'	Stadium: Olimpico

17 January 1988 15	Verona	0–1	Roma	Verona
		Report	Boniek 71'	Stadium: Marcantonio Bentegodi

24 January 1988 16	Roma	3–0	Ascoli	Rome
	Giannini 31', 58' (pen.); Desideri 89'	Report		Stadium: Olimpico

31 January 1988 17	Cesena	0–0	Roma	Cesena
		Report

7 February 1988 18	Roma	0–0	Avellino	Rome
		Report		Stadium: Olimpico

14 February 1988 19	Pisa	1–1	Roma	Pisa
	Piovanelli 84'	Report	Oddi 69'	Stadium: Arena Garibaldi

28 February 1988 20	Roma	2–0	Juventus	Rome
	Desideri 69, 84'	Report		Stadium: Olimpico

6 March 1988 21	Napoli	1–2	Roma	Naples
	Careca 80'	Report	Giannini 21'; Oddi 71'	Stadium: San Paolo

13 March 1988 22	Como	0–1	Roma	Como
		Report	Policano 49'	Stadium: Giuseppe Sinigaglia

20 March 1988 23	Roma	1–0	Empoli	Rome
	Giannini 50'	Report		Stadium: Olimpico

27 March 1988 24	Inter	4–2	Roma	Milan
	Altobelli 13' (pen.); Bergomi 17'; Ciocci 30, 68'	Report	Giannini 38' (pen.); Bergomi 45' (o.g.)	Stadium: Giuseppe Meazza

10 April 1988 25	Roma	0–2	Sampdoria	Rome
		Report	Vialli 67'; Bonomi 76' (pen.)	Stadium: Olimpico

17 April 1988 26	Roma	0–2	Milan	Rome
		Report	Virdis 25'; Massaro 85'	Stadium: Olimpico

24 April 1988 27	Pescara	0–0	Roma	Pescara
		Report		Stadium: Adriatico

1 May 1988 28	Roma	2–1	Fiorentina	Rome
	Giannini 32, 39'	Report	Rebonato 76'	Stadium: Olimpico

8 May 1988 29	Torino	2–0	Roma	Turin
	Gritti 54'; Crippa 88'	Report		Stadium: Comunale

15 May 1988 30	Roma	1–0	Sampdoria	Rome
	Manfredonia 8'	Report		Stadium: Olimpico

=== Top scorers ===
- (Italy) Giuseppe Giannini 11 (2)
- (Poland) Zbigniew Boniek 6 (2)
- (Italy) Stefano Desideri 4
- (Italy) Lionello Manfredonia 3
- (Germany) Rudi Völler 3

=== Coppa Italia ===
First Round - Group 6

23 August 1987 1	Roma	1–0	Monopoli	Rome
20:30	Agostini 62'	Report		Stadium: Flaminio; Attendance: 18,000; Referee: Amendolia

26 August 1987 2	Triestina	0–2	Roma	Trieste
20:30		Report	31' Manfredonia; 79' Völler	Stadium: Stadio Giuseppe Grezar; Referee: Lanese

30 August 1987 3	Pescara	0–0 (3–4 p)	Roma	Pescara
20:30		Report		Stadium: Adriatico; Attendance: 30,000; Referee: Lombardo
	Penalties
	Júnior (penalty missed); Slišković (penalty missed); Berlinghieri (penalty scored); Loseto (penalty scored); Pagano (penalty scored)		(penalty scored) Giannini; (penalty missed) Righetti; (penalty scored) Gerolin; (penalty scored) Agostini; (penalty scored) Völler

2 September 1987 4	Roma	2–1	Genoa	Rome
20:30	Gentilini 48' (o.g.); Giannini 63'	Report	30' (pen.) Briaschi	Stadium: Stadio Flaminio; Referee: Pairetto

6 September 1987 5	Cagliari	1–1 (1–4 p)	Roma	Cagliari
20:30	Pallanch 85'	Report	48' Boniek	Stadium: Stadio Sant'Elia; Attendance: 10,000; Referee: Pezzella
	Penalties
	Bernardini (penalty scored); Saurini (penalty missed); Congiu (penalty missed)		(penalty scored) Desideri; (penalty scored) Boniek; (penalty scored) Giannini; (penalty scored) Gerolin

Eightfinals

6 January 1988 First leg	Empoli	2–1	Roma	Empoli
14:45	Zanoncelli 11'; Brambati 24'	Report	90+1' Völler	Stadium: Carlo Castellani; Attendance: 4,134; Referee: Magni

20 January 1988 Second leg	Roma	0–0 (1–2 agg.)	Empoli	Rome
14:45		Report		Stadium: Olimpico; Attendance: 12,740; Referee: Pairetto

== Sources ==
- RSSSF - Italy 1987/88
