= 1992–93 Ternana Calcio season =

Ternana Calcio
1992–93 season
- Chairman: Rinaldo Gelfusa
- Manager: Roberto Clagluna (until 26 October); Francesco Liguori (from 26 October to 18 January); Roberto Clagluna (from 18 January)
- Stadium: Stadio Libero Liberati
- Serie B: 20th (relegated)
- Coppa Italia: Second round
- Top goalscorer: League: Francesco Fiori (8); All: Francesco Fiori (8)
- Biggest defeat: Padova 5–0 Ternana

The 1992–93 season was Ternana Calcio's 68th season in existence and first one back in the Serie B since 1980. They also competed in the Coppa Italia. The season started on 23 August 1992 and ended on 13 June 1993.

== Competitions ==
=== Overall record ===
Competition	First match	Last match	Starting round	Final position	Record							
Competition	First match	Last match	Starting round	Final position	Pld	W	D	L	GF	GA	GD	Win %
Serie B	6 September 1992	13 June 1993	Matchday 1	20th	38	4	10	24	25	63	−38	10.53
Coppa Italia	23 August 1992	2 September 1992	First round	Second round	3	0	1	2	3	11	−8	0.00
Total					41	4	11	26	28	74	−46	9.76

Source: Competitions

=== Serie B ===
==== League table ====
Pos	Team	Pld	W	D	L	GF	GA	GD	Pts	Promotion or relegation
16	Fidelis Andria	38	6	20	12	27	34	−7	32	
17	S.P.A.L. (R)	38	8	15	15	30	42	−12	31	Relegation to Serie C1
18	Bologna (R)	38	9	12	17	38	55	−17	30	Relegation to Serie C1
19	Taranto (R, E, R, R)	38	6	15	17	30	51	−21	27	Relegation to Campionato Nazionale Dilettanti (Note: Taranto and Ternana went bankrupt and lost their professional status.)
20	Ternana (R, E, R)	38	4	10	24	25	63	−38	18	Relegation to Campionato Nazionale Dilettanti

Source: Head-to-head points used for three or more clubs finishing at the same result.
(E) Eliminated; (R) Relegated

==== Results summary ====
Overall								Home						Away					
Pld	W	D	L	GF	GA	GD	Pts	W	D	L	GF	GA	GD	W	D	L	GF	GA	GD
38	4	10	24	0	0	0	22	4	6	9	0	0	0	0	4	15	0	0	0

==== Results by round ====
Round	1	2	3	4	5	6	7	8	9	10	11	12	13	14	15	16	17	18	19	20	21	22	23	24	25	26	27	28	29	30	31	32	33	34	35	36	37	38
Ground	H	A	H	A	H	A	H	A	H	A	H	A	H	A	H	A	H	A	H	A	H	A	H	A	H	A	H	A	H	A	H	A	H	A	H	A	H	A
Result	D	L	L	D	D	L	L	L	D	L	L	L	L	D	W	L	D	L	L	L	L	L	L	L	W	L	W	D	L	L	L	L	D	D	W	L	D	L
Position	8	16	20	17	17	18	19	20	20	20	20	20	20	20	20	20	20	20	20	20	20	20	20	20	20	20	20	20	20	20	20	20	20	20	20	20	20	20

A = Away; H = Home; W = Win; D = Draw; L = Loss

==== Matches ====
6 September 1992 1	Ternana	1–1	SPAL	Terni
				Stadium: Stadio Libero Liberati

13 September 1992 2	Lecce	2–1	Ternana	Lecce
				Stadium: Stadio Via del mare

20 September 1992 3	Ternana	0–2	Bologna	Terni
				Stadium: Stadio Libero Liberati

27 September 1992 4	Cosenza	1–1	Ternana	Cosenza
				Stadium: Stadio San Vito

4 October 1992 5	Ternana	0–0	Monza	Terni
				Stadium: Stadio Libero Liberati

11 October 1992 6	Bari	3–1	Ternana	Bari
				Stadium: Stadio San Nicola

18 October 1992 7	Ternana	0–3	Venezia	Terni
				Stadium: Stadio Libero Liberati

25 October 1992 8	Lucchese	2–0	Ternana	Lucca
				Stadium: Stadio Porta Elisa

1 November 1992 9	Ternana	2–2	Taranto	Terni
				Stadium: Stadio Libero Liberati

8 November 1992 10	Piacenza	2–1	Ternana	Piacenza
				Stadium: Stadio Leonardo Garilli

15 November 1992 11	Ternana	0–2	Ascoli	Terni
				Stadium: Stadio Libero Liberati

22 November 1992 12	Padova	5–0	Ternana	Padua
				Stadium: Stadio Silvio Appiani

29 November 1992 13	Ternana	0–1	Reggiana	Terni
				Stadium: Stadio Libero Liberati

6 December 1992 14	Fidelis Andria	0–0	Ternana	Andria
				Stadium: Stadio Degli Ulivi

13 December 1992 15	Ternana	2–0	Modena	Terni
				Stadium: Stadio Libero Liberati

20 December 1992 16	Pisa	2–0	Ternana	Pisa
				Stadium: Arena Garibaldi

3 January 1993 17	Ternana	2–2	Cesena	Terni
				Stadium: Stadio Libero Liberati

10 January 1993 18	Verona	2–0	Ternana	Verona
				Stadium: Stadio Marcantonio Bentegodi

17 January 1993 19	Ternana	1–2	Cremonese	Terni
				Stadium: Stadio Libero Liberati

24 January 1993 20	SPAL	3–0	Ternana	Ferrara
				Stadium: Stadio Paolo Mazza

31 January 1993 21	Ternana	0–1	Lecce	Terni
				Stadium: Stadio Libero Liberati

7 February 1993 22	Bologna	1–0	Ternana	Bologna
	Türkyilmaz 67'			Stadium: Stadio Renato Dall'Ara

21 February 1993 23	Ternana	0–1	Cosenza	Terni
				Stadium: Stadio Libero Liberati

28 February 1993 24	Monza	1–0	Ternana	Monza
				Stadium: Stadio Brianteo

7 March 1993 25	Ternana	3–1	Bari	Terni
				Stadium: Stadio Libero Liberati

14 March 1993 26	Venezia	3–0	Ternana	Venice
				Stadium: Stadio Pier Luigi Penzo

21 March 1993 27	Ternana	1–0	Lucchese	Terni
				Stadium: Stadio Libero Liberati

4 April 1993 28	Taranto	1–1	Ternana	Taranto
				Stadium: Stadio Erasmo Iacovone

10 April 1993 29	Ternana	0–2	Piacenza	Terni
				Stadium: Stadio Libero Liberati

18 April 1993 30	Ascoli	4–1	Ternana	Ascoli Piceno
				Stadium: Stadio Cino e Lillo Del Duca

25 April 1993 31	Ternana	0–1	Padova	Terni
				Stadium: Stadio Libero Liberati

2 May 1993 32	Reggiana	2–1	Ternana	Reggio Emilia
				Stadium: Stadio Mirabello; Referee: Giacinto Franceschini

9 May 1993 33	Ternana	1–1	Fidelis Andria	Terni
				Stadium: Stadio Libero Liberati

16 May 1993 34	Modena	0–0	Ternana	Modena
				Stadium: Stadio Alberto Braglia; Referee: Emilio Pellegrino

23 May 1993 35	Ternana	3–0	Pisa	Terni
				Stadium: Stadio Libero Liberati

30 May 1993 36	Cesena	3–2	Ternana	Cesena
				Stadium: Stadio Dino Manuzzi

6 June 1993 37	Ternana	1–1	Verona	Terni
				Stadium: Stadio Libero Liberati

13 June 1993 38	Cremonese	4–0	Ternana	Cremona
	Maspero 16'; Giandebiaggi 37'; Tentoni 49'; Dezotti 83'			Stadium: Stadio Giovanni Zini; Referee: Gennaro Borriello

=== Coppa Italia ===
23 August 1992 First round	Ternana	1–1 (a.e.t.) (5–3 p)	Piacenza	Terni
20:30 CEST (UTC+2)	Ghezzi 115' (pen.)		Rossi 113' (o.g.)	Stadium: Stadio Libero Liberati; Referee: Robert Boggi

26 August 1992 Second round First leg	Milan	4–0	Ternana	Milan
20:30 CEST (UTC+2)	Savićević 23' (pen.), 60'; Gullit 51'; Massaro 69'			Stadium: San Siro; Attendance: 6,200; Referee: Luciano Luci

2 September 1992 Second round Second leg	Ternana	2–6 (2–10 agg.)	Milan	Terni
20:30 CEST (UTC+2)	Negri 45'; Ghezzi 85' (pen.)		Massaro 20'; Cavezzi 22' (o.g.); Savićević 25'; Gullit 59', 77'; Evani 66'	Stadium: Stadio Libero Liberati; Attendance: 15,000; Referee: Pasquale Rodomonti
