= Cucciari =

Cucciari is an Italian surname. Notable people with the surname include:

- Alessandro Cucciari (born 1969), Italian footballer and manager
- Geppi Cucciari (born 1973), Italian stand-up comedian, actress, and television presenter
