= Tontini =

Tontini is an Italian surname. Notable people with the surname include:

- Felipe Tontini (born 1995), Brazilian footballer
- Ferro Tontini (born 1969), Italian footballer
