= Giuseppe Zinetti =

Italian footballer and manager

Personal information
- Date of birth: 22 June 1958 (age 68)
- Place of birth: Leno, Italy
- Height: 1.83 m (6 ft 0 in)
- Position: Goalkeeper

Senior career*
Years	Team	Apps	(Gls)
1976–1977	Imola	20	(0)
1977–1987	Bologna	225	(0)
1983–1984	→ Triestina (loan)	17	(0)
1987–1990	Pescara	60	(0)
1990–1993	Roma	30	(0)
1993–1994	Ascoli	2	(0)
Total		354	(0)
- * Club domestic league appearances and goals

Giuseppe Zinetti (born 22 June 1958) is an Italian former professional football manager and former player, who played as a goalkeeper.

== Career ==
Zinetti was born in Leno. Throughout his club career, he played for Italian sides Imola (1976–1977), Bologna (1977–1987), Triestina (on loan during the 1983–84 season), Pescara (1987–1990), and Roma (1990–1993), where he usually served as the club's second goalkeeper behind Giovanni Cervone; with Roma, he won the Coppa Italia in 1991, before ending his career with Ascoli in Serie B, where he was the club's second goalkeeper, retiring at the conclusion of the 1993–94 season.

== Style of play ==
Regarded as one of the best Italian goalkeepers of his generation, Zinetti was an athletic and reliable shot-stopper, who was known for his efficient rather than spectacular playing style, as well as his handling.

== Honours ==
Roma

- Coppa Italia: 1990–91
