= Aldair =

Brazilian footballer (born 1965)

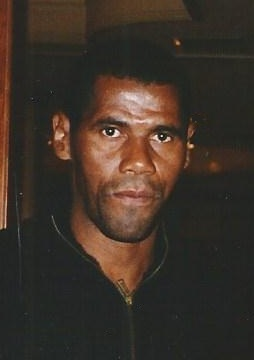
- Aldair in 2005

Personal information
- Full name: Aldair Nascimento dos Santos
- Date of birth: 30 November 1965 (age 60)
- Place of birth: Ilhéus, Brazil
- Height: 1.83 m (6 ft 0 in)
- Position: Centre back

Senior career*
Years	Team	Apps	(Gls)
1985–1989	Flamengo	54	(3)
1989–1990	Benfica	22	(5)
1990–2003	Roma	330	(14)
2003–2004	Genoa	17	(1)
2005	Rio Branco	2	(0)
2007–2009	Murata	10	(0)
Total		435	(23)

International career
1996	Brazil Olympic (O.P.)	6	(0)
1989–2000	Brazil	81	(3)
Medal record
Men's Football
Representing Brazil
FIFA World Cup
Winner	1994 USA
Runner-up	1998 France
FIFA Confederations Cup
Winner	1997 Saudi Arabia
Copa América
Winner	1989 Brazil
Winner	1997 Bolivia
Runner-up	1995 Uruguay
Olympic Games
Bronze medal – third place	1996 Atlanta	Team
- * Club domestic league appearances and goals

Aldair Nascimento dos Santos (Brazilian Portuguese: [awdaˈiʁ]; born 30 November 1965), known simply as Aldair, is a Brazilian retired footballer who played as a centre back, and who was part of the Brazil national team that won the 1994 FIFA World Cup.

Considered as one of Brazil's greatest defenders, he spent most of his professional career at Italian club AS Roma, where he later also served as captain, winning the Serie A title with the club in 2001. Nicknamed "Pluto" by Roma fans, he is one of the members to have been inducted into the club's Hall of Fame.

== Club career ==
Aldair started playing at Flamengo where he won the State Championship Campeonato Carioca in 1986. He moved to Europe in 1989, playing with Benfica, winning the Portuguese Supercup, and reaching the European Cup final during his only season with the team.

Aldair subsequently moved to AS Roma in 1990 and played with this club during 13 seasons, until 2003. He played a total of 436 matches with the Giallorossi, scoring 20 goals in total. During this period he won the Serie A in 2001, one Supercoppa Italiana, and one Coppa Italia in 1991 (also reaching the UEFA Cup final in the same year). In 2000, Aldair was selected in the FIFA XI. Though, he remained loyal to Roma in spite of the club not having won any major international honours during his time there.

Due to his long career with Roma, Aldair is currently the most-capped foreign player in the Italian club's history and the club decided to retire his number 6 jersey when he left the team in 2003. However, this retirement was not permanent, as in 2013 the shirt number 6 has been conceded to Kevin Strootman, with Aldair's approval. In 1998, he was chosen to be the captain of the Giallorossi but preferred to grant the armband to the then 22-years old Francesco Totti. For his contribution to the club, Aldair was included into the AS Roma Hall of Fame in 2012, and thus recognized as one of the best footballers in the club's history.

After Roma, Aldair then briefly joined Genoa. In July 2005, Aldair announced plans of playing for Rio Branco, and played two games for the club in the state championship, helping his team to win the title.

Former teammate and good friend Massimo Agostini convinced him to play in San Marino for SS Murata in order to boost their Champions League campaign. After Murata's dreadful 7–1 aggregate defeat to Cypriots APOEL in the first round of qualifying for the 2006–07 UEFA Cup, Agostini decided to call upon Aldair to join him on the Italian Peninsula. Aldair took part in the Champions League qualifying stage in July 2007.

== International career ==
Aldair was part of the Brazilian squad that took part at the 1990 FIFA World Cup. In 1994, he reached the pinnacle of his career when he played for the Brazilian squad that won the 1994 FIFA World Cup. Originally not included in the squad announced on 10 May 1994, he was called up as replacement when Carlos Mozer had to withdraw due to illness. He also played for Brazil in the 1998 World Cup, as Brazil went on to reach the final once again, only to be defeated by France. He took part in three Copa América's with Brazil, winning the title in 1989 and 1997, whilst earning a runners-up medal in 1995. Aldair won a bronze medal at the 1996 Summer Olympics, and was part of the Brazilian team that won the 1997 FIFA Confederations Cup. In addition to these tournaments, Aldair also took part in two friendly tournaments with Brazil, winning the 1995 Umbro Cup, and finishing in second place in the 1997 Tournoi de France. In total, he appeared 81 times for Brazil between 1989 and 2000, scoring three goals.

== Career statistics ==
=== Club ===
Appearances and goals by club, season and competition
Club	Season	League			National Cup		Continental		Other		Total	
Club	Season	Division	Apps	Goals	Apps	Goals	Apps	Goals	Apps	Goals	Apps	Goals
Flamengo	1985	Série A	–	–								
Flamengo	1986	Série A	23	1							23	1
Flamengo	1987	Série A	7	0							7	0
Flamengo	1988	Série A	24	2							24	2
Flamengo	1989	Série A	–	–								
Flamengo	Total		54	3							54	3
Benfica	1989–90	Primeira Divisão	22	5	2	0	8	1	1 (Note: Appearances in Supertaça Cândido de Oliveira)	0	33	6
Roma	1990–91	Serie A	29	2	9	0	11	0	—		49	2
Roma	1991–92	Serie A	33	3	3	0	6	0	1 (Note: Appearances in Supercoppa Italiana)	0	43	3
Roma	1992–93	Serie A	28	2	7	0	7	2	—		42	4
Roma	1993–94	Serie A	12	0	0	0	0	0	—		12	0
Roma	1994–95	Serie A	28	1	5	0	0	0	—		33	1
Roma	1995–96	Serie A	31	0	1	0	7	0	—		39	0
Roma	1996–97	Serie A	32	2	0	0	4	0	—		36	2
Roma	1997–98	Serie A	28	3	6	2	0	0	—		34	5
Roma	1998–99	Serie A	27	0	3	0	7	0	—		37	0
Roma	1999–2000	Serie A	34	1	4	0	8	1	—		46	2
Roma	2000–01	Serie A	15	0	1	0	3	1	—		19	1
Roma	2001–02	Serie A	16	0	1	0	6	0	0	0	23	0
Roma	2002–03	Serie A	17	0	1	0	5	0	—		23	0
Roma	Total		330	14	41	2	64	4	1	0	436	20
Genoa	2003–04	Serie B	17	1	0	0	—		—		17	1
Rio Branco	2005	Série C	–	–	—		—		2 (Note: Appearances in Campeonato Capixaba Série B)	0	2	0
Murata	2007–08	Campionato Sammarinese	10	0			1	0			11	0
Murata	2008–09	Campionato Sammarinese	–	–			1	0			1	0
Murata	Total		10	0			2	0			12	0
Total			433	23	43	2	74	5	4	0	554	30

=== International ===
Appearances and goals by national team and year
National team	Year	Apps	Goals
Brazil	1989	15	0
Brazil	1990	3	1
Brazil	1991	0	0
Brazil	1992	0	0
Brazil	1993	0	0
Brazil	1994	11	0
Brazil	1995	13	1
Brazil	1996	2	0
Brazil	1997	19	1
Brazil	1998	9	0
Brazil	1999	3	0
Brazil	2000	6	0
Total		81	3

Scores and results list Brazil's goal tally first, score column indicates score after each Aldair goal.

List of international goals scored by Aldair
No.	Date	Venue	Opponent	Score	Result	Competition	Ref.
1	5 May 1990	Estádio Brinco de Ouro, Campinas, Brazil	Bulgaria	2–1	2–1	Friendly	
2	20 July 1995	Estadio Domingo Burgueño, Maldonado, Uruguay	United States	1–0	1–0	1995 Copa América	
3	16 June 1997	Estadio Ramón Tahuichi Aguilera, Santa Cruz, Bolivia	Mexico	1–2	3–2	1997 Copa América	

== Honours ==
=== Club ===
Flamengo

- Campeonato Brasileiro Série A: 1987
- Campeonato Carioca: 1986

Benfica

- Portuguese Supercup: 1989
- European Cup runner-up: 1989–90

Roma

- Serie A: 2000–01
- Coppa Italia: 1990–91
- Supercoppa Italiana: 2001
- UEFA Cup runner-up: 1990–91

Rio Branco

- Campeonato Capixaba Série B: 2005

Murata

- Campionato Sammarinese: 2007–08

=== International ===
Brazil

- FIFA World Cup: 1994; runner-up 1998
- Copa América: 1989, 1997; runner-up 1995
- Summer Olympic Games bronze medal: 1996
- FIFA Confederations Cup: 1997

=== Individual ===
- World XI: 2000
- Golden Foot: 2008, as football legend
- AS Roma Hall of Fame: 2012

== See also ==
- List of athletes who came out of retirement
