= Stadio Libero Liberati =

Multi-use stadium in Terni, Italy

Coordinates: 42°33′44″N 12°38′7″E

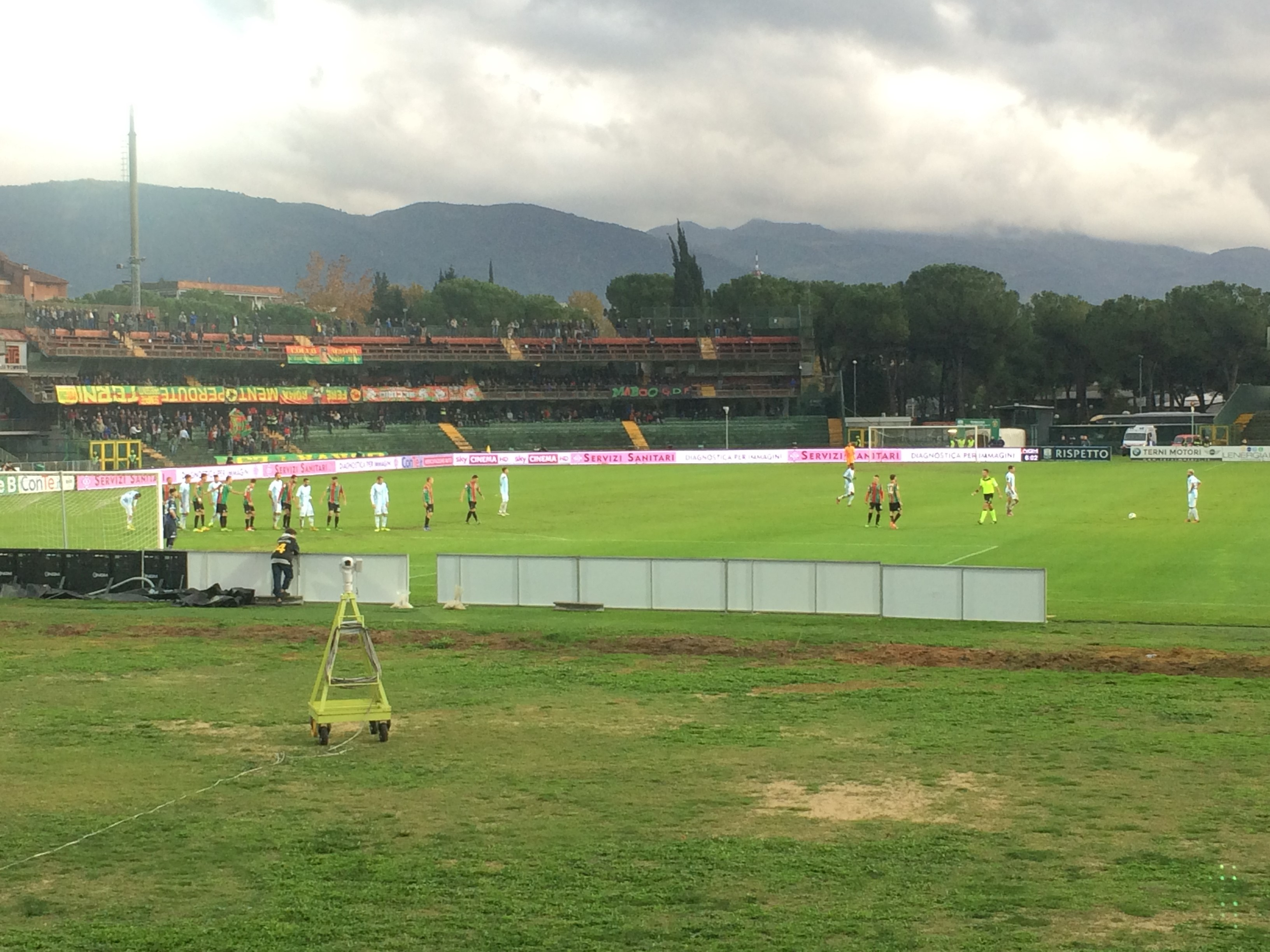
- Interactive map of Stadio Libero Liberati
- Location: Terni, Italy
- Owner: Municipality of Terni
- Capacity: 17,460
- Surface: Grass

Construction
- Groundbreaking: 1969
- Opened: 1969
- Renovated: 1974

Tenants
- Ternana Calcio; Italy national football team (selected matches)

The Stadio Libero Liberati is a multi-use stadium in Terni, Italy. It is currently used mostly for football matches and the home of Ternana Unicusano Calcio. The stadium was built in 1969 and holds 17,460.

The stadium was named after Libero Liberati, a motorcycle racer born in Terni who died in 1962.
