= Stefano Pellegrini (footballer, born 1967) =

Italian footballer

Personal information
- Date of birth: 6 July 1967 (age 59)
- Place of birth: Varese, Italy
- Height: 1.77 m (5 ft 10 in)
- Position: Defender

Senior career*
| Years | Team | Apps | (Gls) |
| 1984–1987 | Varese | 24 | (1) |
| 1987–1988 | Monza | 29 | (0) |
| 1988–1989 | Sampdoria | 13 | (1) |
| 1989–1992 | Roma | 45 | (1) |
| 1992–1996 | Udinese | 78 | (0) |
| 1996–1997 | Carpi | 15 | (0) |
| 1997–1998 | Modena | 19 | (0) |
| 1998–1999 | AC Bellinzona | | |
| 1999–2000 | Fasano | 8 | (0) |
- * Club domestic league appearances and goals

Stefano Pellegrini (born 6 July 1967) is an Italian former professional footballer who played as a defender.

== Career ==
Pellegrini was born in Varese. He played for 8 seasons (121 games, 2 goals) in the Serie A for U.C. Sampdoria, A.S. Roma and Udinese Calcio.

== Personal life ==
His older brothers Luca Pellegrini and Davide Pellegrini also played football professionally. To distinguish them, Luca was referred to as Pellegrini I, Davide as Pellegrini II and Stefano as Pellegrini III.

== Honours ==
Roma

- Coppa Italia: 1990–91
