= Marco De Marchi =

Italian footballer

Personal information
- Full name: Marco Antonio De Marchi
- Date of birth: 8 September 1966 (age 60)
- Place of birth: Milan, Italy
- Height: 1.82 m (6 ft 0 in)
- Position: Defender

Youth career
- 1984–1985: Como

Senior career*
Years	Team	Apps	(Gls)
1985–1987	Ospitaletto	45	(4)
1987–1990	Bologna	72	(4)
1990–1993	Juventus	35	(0)
1991–1992	→ A.S. Roma (loan)	36	(1)
1993–1997	Bologna	100	(4)
1997–2000	Vitesse Arnhem	43	(3)
2000–2002	Dundee	18	(0)
Total		349	(16)
- * Club domestic league appearances and goals

Marco Antonio De Marchi (born 8 September 1966) is an Italian association football agent and former defender, who played as a centre-back.

== Career ==
Born in Milan, De Marchi started his career with the Como youth system, and was successively sold to Serie C2 club Ospitaletto, where he made his professional debut. In 1987, he followed his head coach Luigi Maifredi at Serie B fallen giants Bologna, being the protagonist of the team's promotion to the top flight and the successive campaign that led the rossoblu back into European football.

In 1990, he followed Maifredi once again, joining Juventus. After an unimpressive debut season, he was successively loaned out to AS Roma for the 1991–92 season. After a season back at Juventus, where he played in the first leg of the victorious 1993 UEFA Cup Final, De Marchi successively agreed to a comeback to Bologna in May 1993, becoming also the team captain and playing there for four more seasons, his last ones as a footballer in Italy. In 1997, he agreed for a move abroad to Eredivisie side Vitesse Arnhem, and in 2000 he went to Dundee with little success before retiring from active football in 2002.

== Honours ==
Ospitaletto

- Serie C2: 1986-87

Bologna

- Serie B: 1987–88, 1995–96
- Serie C1: 1994–95

Juventus

- UEFA Cup: 1992–93
