= Giuseppe Ciarrapico =

Italian politician (1934–2019)

Giuseppe Giarrapico
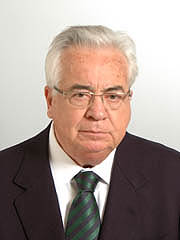

Member of the Senate of the Republic
- In office 29 April 2008 – 15 March 2013
- Constituency: Lazio

Personal details
- Born: 28 January 1934 Rome, Italy
- Died: 14 April 2019 (aged 85) Rome, Italy
- Party: PDL (2008–2013)
- Profession: Entrepreneur, politician

Giuseppe Ciarrapico (28 January 1934 – 14 April 2019) was an Italian entrepreneur, publisher and politician. He was president of the football club AS Roma from 1991 and 1993, and a senator of Italy for Silvio Berlusconi's The People of Freedom party in 2008–2012. Ciarrapico was convicted and imprisoned several times due to his involvement in financial scandals.

== Biography ==
Ciarrapico was born in Rome but grew up in Ciociaria. A supporter of Italian fascism in his youth, he was the printer for the manifestoes of the Italian neo-Fascist party, MSI, in his printing plant at Cassino. His publishing house also released revisionist books and pamphlets. Later in his life became nearer to Giulio Andreotti's right-wing current within Democrazia Cristiana (then Italy's major centre party).

Ciarrapico was also the owner of the large mineral water plants at Fiuggi, as well as of a series of private hospitals in Rome, of the aerotaxi company Air Capitol and of the Roman restaurant Casina Valadier. His holding Italfin '80, under which his properties were collected, went bankrupt in the early 1990s: after being prosecuted for bankruptcy in 1993, Ciarrapico was forced to abandon the presidency of Rome's football club AS Roma, which he had acquired in April 1991. Ciarrapico was tried and sentenced to 4 1/2 years imprisonment, later reduced to 3 years. He was also involved in the Samif-Italsanità healthcare scandal, after which he was imprisoned at Regina Coeli on 21 March 1993; in the same year he was again accused and imprisoned for illegal financing of political parties. He was also sentenced 5.5 years (later reduced to 4.5) in the trial for the Banco Ambrosiano bankrupt.

In 1997 he founded a newspaper, Oggi Sicilia, which was closed in 2000. Ciarrapico's chain of local newspapers also included Ciociaria Oggi, Latina Oggi and Nuovo Oggi Molise. In 2012 Ciarrapico's publishing company was sold because of financial difficulties.

In 2010, when he was a senator for Silvio Berlusconi's party, part of his properties were confiscated by the Guardia di Finanza due to Ciarrapico's illegal acquisition of state contributions for a total of 20 million euros between 2002 and 2007.
