= Stefano Impallomeni =

Italian footballer

Personal information
- Date of birth: 24 October 1967 (age 59)
- Place of birth: Rome, Italy
- Height: 1.76 m (5 ft 9 1/2 in)
- Position: Midfielder

Senior career*
Years	Team	Apps	(Gls)
1985–1990	Roma	10	(0)
1987	→ Cesena (loan)	0	(0)
1987–1989	→ Parma (loan)	13	(2)
1990–1994	Pescara	30	(0)
1992–1993	→ Casertana (loan)	4	(0)
- * Club domestic league appearances and goals

Stefano Impallomeni (born 24 October 1967 in Rome) is a retired Italian professional footballer who played as a midfielder.

He represented Italy at the 1987 FIFA World Youth Championship.
