= Gianni Cavezzi =

Italian footballer

Personal information
- Date of birth: 7 August 1969 (age 57)
- Place of birth: Rome, Italy
- Height: 1.74 m (5 ft 9 in)
- Position: Midfielder

Youth career
- 1987–1988: Roma

Senior career*
Years	Team	Apps	(Gls)
1987–1988	Roma	0	(0)
1988–1989	Latina	32	(3)
1989–1990	Lodigiani	35	(5)
1990–1992	Chieti	57	(2)
1992–1993	Ternana	19	(1)
1993–1995	Padova	27	(0)
1995–1996	Ancona	23	(0)
1996–1997	Lecce	11	(0)
1997–2001	Cagliari	55	(1)
2001	Como	2	(0)
2002	Lodigiani	8	(0)
Total		269	(12)

Managerial career
- 2008–2009: Lazio (youth)
- 2009: San Lorenzo
- 2010–2011: Atletico Flaminia
- 2011–2014: Montespaccato (youth)
- 2014–2016: Savio (youth)
- 2017–2020: Monterosi (youth)
- 2024–: Amatrice (assistant)
- * Club domestic league appearances and goals

Gianni Cavezzi (born 7 August 1969) is an Italian former professional footballer who played as a midfielder.

== Playing career ==
Revealed by the youth sectors at Roma, Cavezzi played the first part of his professional career for teams in Serie C1 and C2. In 1994–95, he was promoted with Padova to Serie A, where he played in eight matches. In 1997 he arrived at Cagliari, the team for which he stood out the most, and stayed for four seasons. Cavezzi ended his career in 2002 with Lodigiani in C2.

== Managerial career ==
As a coach, Cavezzi led the youth sectors at Lazio in 2008–09 season. He has also worked on modest teams and regional youth categories and is currently a technical assistant at Amatrice, which competes in the Seconda Categoria.
