= Alessandro Cucciari =

Italian footballer and coach (born 1969)

Personal information
- Date of birth: 11 September 1969 (age 57)
- Place of birth: Rome, Italy
- Height: 1.80 m (5 ft 11 in)
- Position: Defender

Senior career*
Years	Team	Apps	(Gls)
1988–1990	Roma	6	(0)
1990–1991	Verona	17	(0)
1991–1994	Modena	85	(2)
1994–1995	Casarano	15	(4)
1995–1997	Lecce	61	(4)
1997–1998	Perugia	34	(2)
1998–2000	Ternana	54	(3)
2001–2003	Sampdoria	27	(1)
2003–2004	Siena	18	(0)
2004–2005	Messina	10	(0)
2005–2006	Lucchese	15	(0)

Managerial career
- 2012–2013: Terracina
- 2013–2015: Lupa Roma
- 2015–2016: Lupa Roma
- * Club domestic league appearances and goals

Alessandro Cucciari (born 11 September 1969) is a retired Italian professional football player, and current coach. He was last in charge as head coach of Lega Pro club Lupa Roma.

== Playing career ==
Cucciari played 3 seasons as a defender in the Serie A for AS Roma, Siena and Messina. He won promotion to Serie A on 4 occasions (Verona 1990–91, Lecce 1996–97, Perugia 1997–98 and Sampdoria 2002–03). On all 4 occasions he left the team he won the promotion with in the following off-season, before playing for them in the top flight.

== Coaching career ==
In 2013, he took his first coaching role as boss of Eccellenza amateurs Terracina, guiding them to Serie D promotion through playoffs. He then took over at Serie D club Lupa Roma, immediately guiding them to a historical promotion to Lega Pro on his first season in charge. He resigned on 31 October 2015, after achieving only one point in the first nine Lega Pro games. On 29 December 2015, he was reappointed as Lupa Roma coach in place of Agenore Maurizi, but failed to reverse the club's fortunes and was eventually sacked on 17 April 2016.
