= Giuseppe Giannini =

Italian association football player and manager

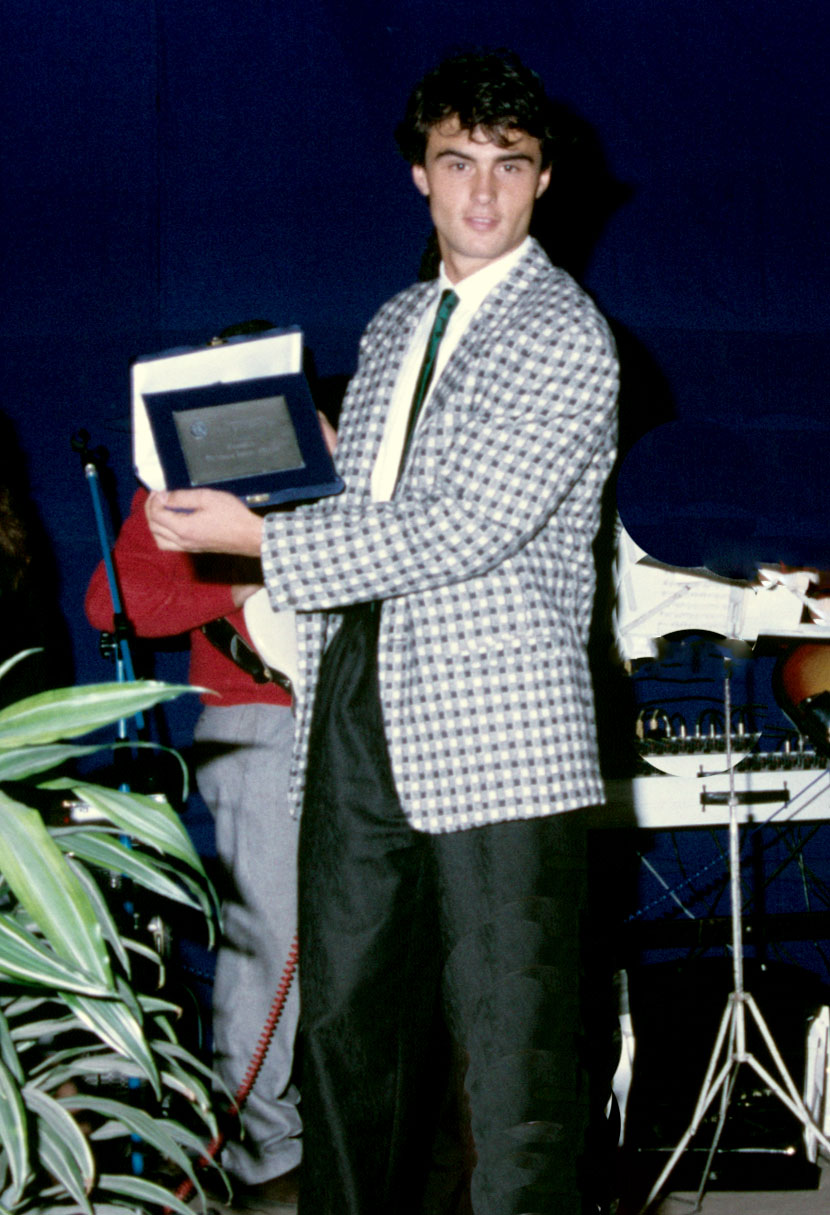
- Giannini in 1983

Personal information
- Full name: Giuseppe Giannini
- Date of birth: 20 August 1964 (age 62)
- Place of birth: Rome, Italy
- Height: 1.77 m (5 ft 10 in)
- Position: Midfielder

Youth career
- 1978–1980: Almas Roma
- 1980–1983: Roma

Senior career*
Years	Team	Apps	(Gls)
1981–1996	Roma	318	(49)
1996–1997	Sturm Graz	16	(2)
1997–1998	Napoli	4	(0)
1998–1999	Lecce	47	(4)
Total		385	(55)

International career
1984–1986	Italy U-21	16	(1)
1986–1991	Italy	47	(6)

Managerial career
- 2004–2005: Foggia
- 2006: Sambenedettese
- 2006–2007: Argeş Piteşti
- 2007–2008: Massese
- 2008–2010: Gallipoli
- 2010: Verona
- 2011: Grosseto
- 2013–2015: Lebanon
- 2017: Latina (head of youth)
- 2017: Racing Roma
- 2017: Unicusano Fondi
Medal record
Men's football
Representing Italy
FIFA World Cup
Third place	1990 Italy
- * Club domestic league appearances and goals

Giuseppe Giannini Cavaliere OMRI (Italian pronunciation: [dʒuˈzɛppe dʒanˈniːni]; born 20 August 1964) is an Italian former professional footballer who played as a midfielder.

He spent the majority of his 15-year playing career with A.S. Roma, and was regarded by supporters as a club symbol, before his successor in the number-10 shirt and offensive midfield playmaker role, Francesco Totti, who cited Giannini as influence. He played 47 times for Italy and starred in the teams that reached the semi-finals of the 1988 UEFA European Championship, and subsequently the 1990 FIFA World Cup on home soil.

He was often referred to as "Il Principe" (The Prince) by Italian sports journalists during his playing career, a reference to his grace on the pitch.

== Club career ==
Born in Rome, Giannini began his career as a youngster with local club Almas Roma. From a young age he attracted the attention of many of Italy's clubs, eventually signing with Roma ahead of rivals including S.S. Lazio and A.C. Milan. He made his Serie A debut on 31 January 1982 in a 1–0 defeat to A.C. Cesena and went on to make over 400 appearances for the club over the following fifteen years. During his time at Roma, whom he went on to captain, he won the Serie A title once, and the Coppa Italia three times; he also played in the UEFA Cup final during the 1990–91 season, although he did not take part in Roma's run to the 1984 European Cup final.

In 1996 Giannini left Roma to play in Austria for Sturm Graz, with whom he spent just half a season before returning to Italy due to homesickness. Before retiring in 1999 Giannini had brief spells with Napoli and Lecce.

== International career ==
Under manager Azeglio Vicini, Giannini reached the final of the 1986 UEFA European Under-21 Championship with the Italy under-21 side, scoring a goal in first leg of the final against Spain, although Italy would eventually be defeated 3–0 on penalties in the second leg, with Giannini missing one of the spot-kicks in the decisive shoot-out, along with Stefano Desideri and Marco Baroni.

Giannini was capped 47 times for the Italian senior national team between 1986 and 1991, scoring 6 goals. He made his international debut against Malta, at the age of 22, in a European Championship qualifier in December 1986. He went on to represent Italy at both the 1988 European Championships and the 1990 World Cup on home soil under Vicini, reaching the semi-final of both tournaments. He was named part of the Team of the Tournament at Euro 1988 for his performances.

He won a bronze medal after a third place finish in the 1990 World Cup, scoring a goal in Italy's second group match, which ended in a 1–0 victory over the United States at the Stadio Olimpico in Rome; he also provided three assists – a joint tournament best – throughout the competition, setting up Salvatore Schillaci's and Roberto Baggio's goals in Italy's final match of the group stage, a 2–0 win against Czechoslovakia, and Aldo Serena's goal in a 2–0 win against Uruguay in the round of 16. He also created the most chances at the 1990 World Cup (25).

Giannini's final appearance for his country came on 12 October 1991 against the Soviet Union.

== Style of play ==
Throughout his career, Giannini was often referred to as "Il Principe" (The Prince), and was described as a "fantasista," due to his creative ability, elegance, technique, vision, and passing range, which made him an effective playmaker. A central midfielder, he was often deployed as a regista or deep-lying playmaker in front of the defence throughout his career, due to his ability to dictate play in midfield and carry the ball with his head up, although he was also capable of playing in a more offensive role as a mezzala, attacking midfielder, or second striker, where his primary function was either to create chances for teammates or make late runs off the ball. Considered to be one of Italy's greatest midfielders of the 80s and 90s, in addition to his technical ability and creativity, he was also a mobile, versatile, and hard-working player, with notable stamina and tactial awareness, despite not being the quickest or most physically gifted player; he also possessed an accurate shot with either foot and an eye for goal from midfield. Moreover, he stood out for his leadership qualities, having served as Roma's captain.

== Managerial career ==
Giannini has worked as a match analyst for RAI following his retirement; he also served as the manager of Serie C1 club Foggia from July 2003 to January 2005, when he was sacked. He started the season 2005–06 at the helm of Serie C1 side Sambenedettese, but was fired in February 2006. Later that year, Giannini then served as coach of Romanian side Argeş Piteşti, but was axed in October after nine consecutive defeats, and replaced by Dorinel Munteanu. In September 2007 he was unveiled as new manager of Massese, another Serie C1 club, being however sacked in February 2008 following disagreements with the board.

In July 2008 he was unveiled as new head coach of Lega Pro Prima Divisione team Gallipoli. In his first season in Salento, Giannini guided Gallipoli to triumph in the league, thus winning a historical first promotion in Serie B for the club. A few days later, however, Giannini and Gallipoli announced to have parted company, also because of financial issues involving the club and some rumoured interest for Giannini from other clubs. Nevertheless, Giannini was then confirmed as coach by new Gallipoli owner D'Odorico.

Despite an impressive first half of season with Gallipoli, who was hailed as one of the main league surprises, Giannini resigned from his managerial post on 8 February 2010 following a 2–2 home draw to Grosseto characterized by the team players stopping for 40 seconds and turning faces towards the stadium stands as a form of protest for not having been paid any monthly salaries since October 2009. At the end of the first half, Giannini was sent off due to protests, and reached the stands in the second half, where he heatedly confronted with chairman D'Odorico and announced his resignation, together with all members of his coaching staff, immediately after the end of the game. However, Giannini withdrew his resignation only two days later following a conciliatory meeting with D'Odorico.

After a string of unimpressive results, Giannini stepped down again on 22 March together with his aides Roberto Corti, Fabrizio Carafa and Franco Mandarino, defining his resignations as "irrevocable".

In June 2010 he agreed a two-year contract as head coach of fallen giants Verona, with the aim to guide the scaligeri to promotion from the Lega Pro Prima Divisione league.

On 30 October 2011, he was appointed head coach of Serie B club Grosseto. He left his post later on 3 December, after a 2–1 win at Pescara (the third consecutive away win during his stint as Grosseto boss), citing his strained relationship with chairman Piero Camilli as the main reason behind his choice. On 6 July 2013, Giannini was officially appointed as the manager of the Lebanese National Team by the helps from Manchester City manager and his friend Roberto Mancini, where he will try to continue the historic success of Lebanon after they reached the final round of qualification for the 2014 World Cup in Brazil.

He started his career during the 2015 AFC Asian Cup qualification. Under his management, Lebanon draw twice against Kuwait. He made everyone suspected on his talents after his team lost 1–4 to Iran in Beirut, even he said that only 100 spectators cheer for Lebanon in Camille Chamoun Stadium. But he almost made the Lebanese dream come true after his team slaughtered Thailand a 5–2 win right in Bangkok, and if they had not been suffered a goal down from Adisak Kraisorn with China's penalty goal, Lebanon would have been in Australia.

His most memorable match was against Olympic Brazil which his talent was proven by two goals led by Mohammed Ghaddar and Hassan Maatouk after Ademilson took the lead for Brazil. His team drew 2–2 because of an offside goal from Vinícius Araújo.

He returned into management in June 2017, being appointed head coach of recently relegated Serie D club Racing Roma. A few days later, after Racing Roma owner acquired the ownership of Serie C club Fondi, he was however named new head coach for the third-tier club. Giannini's stint at Fondi was however short-lived, as he was removed from his position on 19 September 2017 due to poor results.

== Career statistics ==
Appearances and goals by club, season and competition
Club	Season	Domestic Leagues		Domestic Cups^{1}		European Competitions^{2}		Other Tournaments^{3}		Total	
Club	Season	Apps	Goals	Apps	Goals	Apps	Goals	Apps	Goals	Apps	Goals
Roma	1981–82	1	0	0	0	-	-	-	-	1	0
Roma	1982–83	0	0	2	0	-	-	-	-	2	0
Roma	1983–84	2	0	3	0	-	-	-	-	5	0
Roma	1984–85	26	4	6	1	5	0	-	-	37	5
Roma	1985–86	22	2	13	3	-	-	-	-	35	5
Roma	1986–87	25	3	7	2	2	0	-	-	34	5
Roma	1987–88	28	11	7	1	-	-	-	-	35	12
Roma	1988–89	32	6	6	4	6	1	-	-	44	11
Roma	1989–90	31	3	5	2	-	-	-	-	36	5
Roma	1990–91	24	3	8	0	10	2	-	-	42	5
Roma	1991–92	24	4	3	1	4	0	1	0	32	5
Roma	1992–93	29	9	9	4	8	3	-	-	46	16
Roma	1993–94	26	3	3	0	-	-	-	-	29	3
Roma	1994–95	28	1	6	1	-	-	-	-	34	2
Roma	1995–96	20	0	1	0	3	1	-	-	24	1
Sturm Graz	1996–97	16	2	2	1	2	0	1	0	21	3
Napoli	1997–98	4	0	1	1	-	-	-	-	5	1
Lecce	1997–98	14	0	-	-	-	-	-	-	14	0
Lecce	1998–99	33	4	3	0	-	-	-	-	36	4
Career total		385	55	85	21	40	7	2	0	512	83

^{1}Domestic cups include the Coppa Italia and Austrian Cup
^{2}European competitions include the European Cup, Cup Winners' Cup and UEFA Cup
^{3}Other tournaments include the Supercoppa Italiana and Austrian Supercup

== Honours ==
=== Player ===
Roma

- Serie A: 1982–83
- Coppa Italia: 1983–84, 1985–86, 1990–91

Sturm Graz

- Austrian Supercup: 1996
- Austrian Cup: 1996–97

Italy

- Scania 100 Tournament: 1991

=== Manager ===
Gallipoli

- Lega Pro Prima Divisione: 2008–09
- Supercoppa di Lega di Prima Divisione: 2009

=== Individual ===
- UEFA European Championship Team of the Tournament: 1988
- A.S. Roma Hall of Fame: 2013

=== Orders ===
- 5th Class / Knight: Cavaliere Ordine al Merito della Repubblica Italiana: 1991
