= Giovanni Cervone =

Italian international footballer

Personal information
- Date of birth: 16 November 1962 (age 63)
- Place of birth: Brusciano, Italy
- Height: 1.92 m (6 ft 4 in)
- Position: Goalkeeper

Senior career*
Years	Team	Apps	(Gls)
1979–1980	Juve Stabia	6	(0)
1980–1983	Avellino	6	(0)
1983–1984	Catanzaro	29	(0)
1984–1987	Genoa	104	(0)
1987–1988	Parma	23	(0)
1988–1989	Verona	34	(0)
1989–1997	Roma	191	(0)
1997–1999	Brescia	26	(0)
1999–2000	Ravenna	26	(0)
- * Club domestic league appearances and goals

Giovanni Cervone (born 16 November 1962 in Brusciano) is an Italian former professional footballer who played as a goalkeeper. He is now the goalkeeping coach for the Lebanon national team.

== Honours ==
Roma

- Coppa Italia winner: 1990–91.
