= Dario Rossi =

Italian footballer and coach (born 1972)

Personal information
- Date of birth: November 14, 1972 (age 53)
- Place of birth: Alatri, Italy
- Height: 1.78 m (5 ft 10 in)
- Position: Defender

Team information
- Current team: Cavese (asst manager)

Senior career*
Years	Team	Apps	(Gls)
1990–1992	Roma	1	(0)
1992	Ternana	6	(0)
1993	Roma	5	(0)
1993–1994	Modena	8	(0)
1994	Roma	3	(0)
1994–1995	Lecce	15	(0)
1995–1996	Ascoli	26	(0)
1996–1997	SPAL	23	(0)
1997–1999	Montevarchi	62	(0)
1999–2000	Pisa	33	(0)
2000–2001	Vis Pesaro	32	(0)
2001–2003	Pescara	63	(0)
2003–2005	Frosinone	66	(0)
2005–2006	Chieti	15	(0)
2006–2008	Cavese	28	(0)

Managerial career
- 2008–2009: Cavese (assistant)
- 2009–2010: Juve Stabia (assistant)
- 2010–2011: Brindisi (assistant)
- 2011–2012: Portogruaro (assistant)
- 2012–: Avellino (assistant)
- * Club domestic league appearances and goals

Dario Rossi (born November 14, 1972) is an Italian professional football coach and a former player. Currently, he is an assistant manager with U.S. Cremonese.

He was on the Serie A squad of A.S. Roma for parts of 5 seasons, in 3 of which he made appearances for the squad (9 games total).

== Honours ==
- Coppa Italia winner: 1990/91.
