= Ruggiero Rizzitelli =

Italian footballer (born 1967)

Personal information
- Date of birth: 2 September 1967 (age 59)
- Place of birth: Margherita di Savoia, Italy
- Height: 1.77 m (5 ft 10 in)
- Position: Striker

Senior career*
| Years | Team | Apps | (Gls) |
| 1984–1988 | Cesena | 62 | (7) |
| 1988–1994 | Roma | 154 | (29) |
| 1994–1996 | Torino | 60 | (30) |
| 1996–1998 | Bayern Munich | 45 | (11) |
| 1998–2000 | Piacenza | 33 | (1) |
| 2000–2001 | Cesena | 14 | (6) |
| Total | | 369 | (84) |

International career
| 1987–1989 | Italy U21 | 16 | (4) |
| 1988–1991 | Italy | 9 | (2) |
| 1989 | Italy B | 1 | (0) |
- * Club domestic league appearances and goals

Ruggiero Rizzitelli (Italian pronunciation: [rudˈdʒɛːro rittsiˈtɛlli]; born 2 September 1967) is an Italian former footballer who played as a striker.

Due to his goalscoring ability, he was given the nickname "Rizzi-gol" by the fans.

== Club career ==
Rizzitelli started his professional career for Serie B team Cesena during the 1984–85 season, making his Serie A debut in the 1987–88 season. He played four seasons with the small side from Emilia-Romagna before joining A.S. Roma in 1988, where he scored a total of 29 goals in six seasons with the giallorossi, winning a Coppa Italia in 1991. In the same year reached the UEFA Cup Final, but his goal was unable to prevent them from losing to Inter Milan. Roma were also subsequently defeated in the 1991 Supercoppa Italiana.

From 1994 to 1996, he then played for Torino, scoring a very impressive 30 goals in 60 appearances with the granata. Despite his good performances, Torino were relegated to Serie B in 1996, and Rizzitelli agreed to a move to German team FC Bayern Munich, then coached by fellow Italian Giovanni Trapattoni. In his second season with Bayern, he seldom appeared as a regular starter due to injury and the emergence of Carsten Jancker, but proved to be a more than useful player on the bench, thanks to his quickness that made him skillful and dangerous on the counter-attack. He scored a total of 11 goals in 45 appearances with the Bavarian team, winning a Bundesliga title in 1997 and a DFB-Pokal (German Cup) in 1998. He returned to Italy in 1998 to join Piacenza, where he, however, failed to impress. Rizzitelli retired in 2001 after a season with Cesena.

== International career ==
Rizzitelli received a total of nine caps with the Italian team between 1988 and 1991, making his debut on 20 February 1988 in a friendly match against USSR, played at Stadio San Nicola, Bari and won 4–1 by the azzurri. He scored a total of two goals with the Italian team and was selected for the Euro 88 squad, but played no part in the tournament, as Italy reached the semi-finals. He was also part of the Italian Olympic squad that finished fourth in the 1988 Olympics in Seoul.

== Style of play ==
Rizzitelli was a versatile forward, capable of playing in several offensive positions; he was deployed as a main striker as well as in a supporting role, in particular as a second striker off another centre forward, or even as a winger or outside forward, where he could deliver assists to teammates. His versatility was demonstrated during his time at Roma, where he formed an effective partnership with a more offensive centre forward, Rudi Völler. He was a quick, agile, and tenacious player, with good technique, who excelled in the air, despite his small stature.

== Honours ==
=== Club ===
Roma

- Coppa Italia: 1990–91

Bayern Munich

- Bundesliga: 1996–97
- DFB-Pokal: 1997–98
- DFB-Ligapokal: 1997

Italy

- Scania 100 Tournament: 1991
