= Manuel Gerolin =

Italian footballer

Personal information
- Date of birth: 9 February 1961 (age 65)
- Place of birth: Mestre, Italy
- Height: 1.78 m (5 ft 10 in)
- Position: Midfielder

Senior career*
Years	Team	Apps	(Gls)
1978–1980	Conegliano Calcio	35	(5)
1980–1985	Udinese	122	(13)
1985–1991	Roma	138	(5)
1991–1993	Bologna	24	(3)
Total		319	(26)
- * Club domestic league appearances and goals

Manuel Gerolin (born 9 February 1961 in Mestre) is an Italian former professional footballer who played as a midfielder. In 2017, Gerolin was a sporting director of Udinese.

== Honours ==
Roma

- Coppa Italia: 1985–86, 1990–91
