= Antonio Tempestilli =

Italian footballer (born 1959)

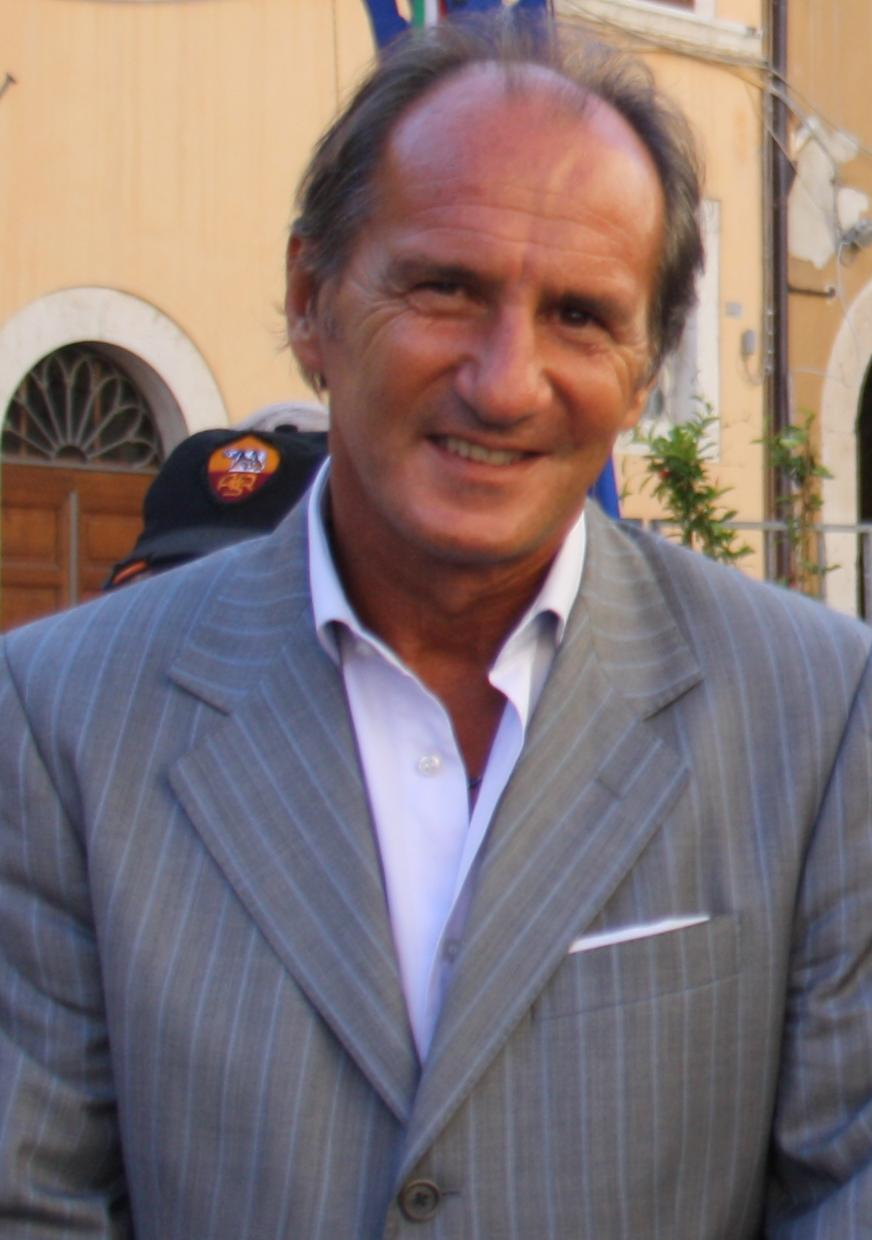
- Antonio Tempestilli in 2010.

Personal information
- Date of birth: 8 October 1959 (age 67)
- Place of birth: Campli, Italy
- Height: 1.75 m (5 ft 9 in)
- Position: Defender

Senior career*
Years	Team	Apps	(Gls)
1978–1980	Banco di Roma	49	(0)
1980–1981	Internazionale	5	(0)
1981–1987	Como	167	(5)
1987–1993	Roma	120	(5)
Total		341	(10)
- * Club domestic league appearances and goals

Antonio Tempestilli (born 8 October 1959) is an Italian former professional footballer who played as a defender.

== Honours ==
Roma

- Coppa Italia winner: 1990–91
