= Ferro Tontini =

Italian footballer

Personal information
- Date of birth: August 14, 1969 (age 57)
- Place of birth: Anzio, Italy
- Height: 1.90 m (6 ft 3 in)
- Position: Goalkeeper

Senior career*
Years	Team	Apps	(Gls)
1988–1990	Roma	1	(0)
1990–1991	Cosenza	5	(0)
1991–1992	Roma	0	(0)
1992–1993	Catania	30	(0)
1993–1994	Modena	32	(0)
1994–1995	Lucchese	10	(0)
- * Club domestic league appearances and goals

Ferro Tontini (born August 14, 1969, in Anzio) is a retired Italian professional footballer who played as a goalkeeper.

He played his only Serie A game in the 1989–90 season for AS Roma.
