= Fabio Baldas =

Italian football referee (born 1949)

- Born: 19 March 1949 (age 77); Trieste, Italy

Domestic
Years	League	Role
1985–1994	Serie A	Referee

International
Years	League	Role
1991–1994	FIFA–listed	Referee

Fabio Baldas (born 19 March 1949 in Trieste) is a former association football referee from Italy. He is mostly known for supervising one match in the 1994 FIFA World Cup in the United States, the first-round Group A contest between the United States and Colombia.

Baldas served as a referee in numerous international competitions, including the 1991 FIFA U-17 World Championship and the 1992 Olympic tournament. He also officiated in 1994 World Cup qualifiers.
