= Luciano Luci =

Italian football referee

Luciano Luci (born August 2, 1949 in Campiglia Marittima) is a retired football referee from Italy. He has refereed in the Serie A since 1985. His first match was played between AC Milan and SS Lazio on 12 May. Since then, he has refereed 105 matches in the Serie A (and 107 in Serie B). As an assistant referee he joined UEFA in the later 1980s in 25 international matches. He has also refereed one Coppa Italia final.
