= Stefano Desideri =

Italian footballer and manager

Personal information
- Date of birth: 3 July 1965 (age 61)
- Place of birth: Rome, Italy
- Height: 1.78 m (5 ft 10 in)
- Position: Midfielder

Senior career*
| Years | Team | Apps | (Gls) |
| 1984–1985 | Piacenza | 19 | (0) |
| 1985–1991 | Roma | 136 | (24) |
| 1991–1992 | Internazionale | 33 | (5) |
| 1992–1997 | Udinese | 128 | (7) |
| 1997–1998 | Livorno | 15 | (0) |
| 1998–2001 | Monterotondo | | |

International career
| 1986–1987 | Italy U21 | 3 | (0) |

Managerial career
- 1999–2000: Lugano (assistant coach)
- 2000: Marsala
- 2001: Astrea
- 2014–2017: FC Pune City (team manager)
- * Club domestic league appearances and goals

Stefano Desideri (born 3 July 1965) is an Italian football coach and a former professional player who played as a midfielder.

Desideri was born in Rome, and played for Italy at the 1988 Summer Olympics.

== Honours ==
Roma

- Coppa Italia: 1985–86, 1990–91
