= Pierluigi Pairetto =

Italian football referee

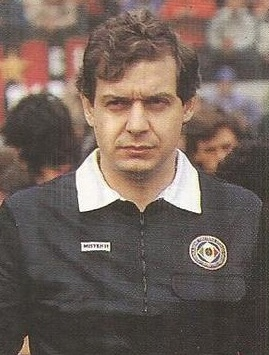
- Born: 15 July 1952 (age 74); Turin, Italy
- Other occupation: Veterinarian

Domestic
Years	League	Role
1981–1998	Serie A	Referee

International
Years	League	Role
1989–1997	FIFA-listed	Referee

Pierluigi Pairetto (born 15 July 1952 in Turin) is an Italian former football referee.

== Career ==
Among the many prestigious games he officiated were the 1996 UEFA Cup Winners' Cup final between Paris Saint-Germain and Rapid Wien (1–0), the Euro 96 final between Germany and the Czech Republic at Wembley (2–1 after a golden goal in extra-time), and the classic USA 94 second-round clash between Romania and Argentina (3–2) in Pasadena. He was also one of the officials at UEFA Euro 1992. In Italy, he officiated 219 matches in Serie A, as well as the second leg of the 1996 Coppa Italia final between Atalanta and Fiorentina (0–2, with Fiorentina winning 3–0 on aggregate), the 1992 Supercoppa Italiana between Milan and Parma (2–1), and the 1994 Supercoppa Italiana between Milan and Sampdoria (1–1, with Milan winning 4–3 on penalties).

From 1999 to 2005 Pairetto was the referee designator with Paolo Bergamo for Italian Football Federation (FIGC) for Serie A and from 2002 to 2006 he held also the position of Italian vice chairman of the UEFA Referees Committee until the summer of 2006, when it was discovered that he had been in regular telephone contact with Juventus FC chief executive Luciano Moggi regarding which referees would be selected for 2004–05 Serie A fixtures. As a result of his involvement in this scandal, he initially received a ban of two years and six months from football, although this was later increased to three and a half years.

== Major matches refereed ==
Date	Match	Tournament	Ref
8 May 1996	Paris Saint-Germain vs. Rapid Wien (1–0)	1996 UEFA Cup Winners' Cup final	
30 June 1996	Czech Republic vs. Germany (1–2 a.e.t.)	UEFA Euro 1996 Final	

== Honours ==
- Premio Giovanni Mauro: 1988–89

Preceded by 1992 (Switzerland) Bruno Galler	UEFA European Football Championship final referee 1996	Succeeded by 2000 (Sweden) Anders Frisk
Preceded by 1995 (Italy) Piero Ceccarini	UEFA Cup Winners' Cup final referee 1996	Succeeded by 1997 (Germany) Markus Merk
