= 1990–91 Coppa Italia =

Tournament details
- Country: Italy
- Dates: 26 Aug 1990 – 9 June 1991
- Teams: 48

Final positions
- Champions: Roma (7th title)
- Runners-up: Sampdoria

Tournament statistics
- Matches played: 94
- Goals scored: 195 (2.07 per match)
- Top goal scorer(s): Ruggiero Rizzitelli; Rudi Völler (4 goals)

The 1990–91 Coppa Italia, the 44th Coppa Italia was an Italian Football Federation domestic cup competition won by Roma.

== First round ==
Team 1	Agg.	Team 2	1st leg	2nd leg
Cosenza	3-1	Barletta	0-1	3-0 (aet)
Fiorentina	2-0	Venezia	1-0	1-0
Reggiana	2-2 (a)	Como	0-1	2-1 (aet)
Reggina	2-4	Modena	1-3	1-1
Cremonese	2-0	Mantova	2-0	0-0
Brescia	1-0	Salernitana	0-0	1-0
Hellas Verona	5-2	Palermo	2-1	3-1
Padova	3-3 (a)	Monza	3-1	0-2
Avellino	1-3	Taranto	1-1	0-2
Udinese	4-2	Casertana	4-1	0-1
Foggia	5-4	Lucchese	4-1	1-3
Ascoli	1–2	Giarre	1-0	0-2
Ancona	3-3 (a)	Messina	2-2	1-1
Pescara	3-0	Catanzaro	1-0	2-0
Lecce	0-0 (5-4 p)	Empoli	0-0	0-0
Triestina	2-0	Licata	1-0	1-0

== Second round ==
Team 1	Agg.	Team 2	1st leg	2nd leg
Napoli	5-0	Cosenza	3-0	2-0
Fiorentina	2-0	Parma	1-0	1-0
Bologna	4-2	Reggiana	4-1	0-1
Modena	3-1	Lazio	0-0	3-1
Cesena	4-5	Cremonese	4-3	0-2
Sampdoria	5-1	Brescia	1-1	4-0
Hellas Verona	1-4	Torino	0-4	1-0
Monza	1-3	Internazionale	0-1	1-2
Juventus	3-2	Taranto	2-0	1-2
Udinese	0-2	Pisa	0-1	0-1
Roma	4-1	Foggia	1-0	3-1
Giarre	0-3	Genoa	0-0	0-3
Bari	0-0 (5-3 p)	Messina	0-0	0-0
Atalanta	2-1	Pescara	2-0	0-1
Lecce	5-0	Cagliari	4-0	1-0
Milan	2-1	Triestina	1-0	1-1

== Knockout stage ==
Round of 16
Napoli	2	0	2
Fiorentina	1	0	1
Bologna	1	2	3
Modena	0	1	1
Sampdoria	1	3	4
Cremonese	1	2	3
Internazionale	2	0	2
Torino	1	1	2 (a)
Juventus	3	2	5
Pisa	2	1	3
Roma	2	1	3
Genoa	0	1	1
Atalanta	1	0	1
Bari	0	3	3
Milan	3	2	5
Lecce	0	2	2

Quarter-finals
Napoli	0	3	3
Bologna	1	1	2
Torino	1	0	1 (2)
Sampdoria (p)	0	1	1 (4)
Roma	1	2	3
Juventus	1	0	1
Bari	0	0	0
Milan	1	0	1

Semi-finals
Napoli	1	0	1
Sampdoria	0	2	2
Milan	0	0	0
Roma	0	1	1

Final
Roma	3	1	4
Sampdoria	1	1	2

== Final ==
=== First leg ===
30 May 1991
18:00

Roma	3–1	Sampdoria
Pellegrini 12' (o.g.); Berthold 35'; Völler 40' (pen.)		Katanec 29'

Stadio Olimpico, Rome
Attendance: 55,067
Referee: Pierluigi Pairetto

=== Second leg ===
9 June 1991
18:00

Sampdoria	1–1	Roma
Aldair 79' (o.g.)		Völler 56' (pen.)

Stadio Luigi Ferraris, Genoa
Attendance: 36,577
Referee: Arcangelo Pezzella

Roma won 4–2 on aggregate.

== Top goalscorers ==
Rank	Player	Club	Goals
1	(Italy) Ruggiero Rizzitelli	Roma	4
1	(Germany) Rudi Völler	Roma	4
3	(Italy) Gianluca Vialli	Sampdoria	3
3	(Italy) Giovanni Invernizzi	Sampdoria	3
3	(Italy) Roberto Baggio	Juventus	3
3	(Italy) Enio Bonaldi	Modena	3
3	(Italy) Giuseppe Incocciati	Napoli	3
3	(Italy) Lamberto Piovanelli	Pisa	3
