= 1996–97 AS Roma season =

Roma
1996–97 season
- President: Franco Sensi
- Manager: Carlos Bianchi (until 7 April 1997); Nils Liedholm
- Stadium: Stadio Olimpico
- Serie A: 12th
- Coppa Italia: Second round
- UEFA Cup: Second round
- Top goalscorer: League: Abel Balbo (17); All: Abel Balbo (19)
Home colours	Away colours	Third colours

Associazione Sportiva Roma did not have its best season, dropping into the lower half of the league, and only saving its Serie A status by a few points. New coach Carlos Bianchi failed to get the most out of a prolific squad, and was sacked in the middle of the season, with club advisor Nils Liedholm taking over at the helm for the rest of the championship.

== Players ==
Note: Flags indicate national team as defined under FIFA eligibility rules; some limited exceptions apply. Players may hold more than one non-FIFA nationality.

No.	Pos.	Nation	Player
1	GK	ITA	Giovanni Cervone
2	DF	ARG	Roberto Trotta
3	DF	ITA	Marco Lanna
4	DF	ITA	Enrico Annoni
5	MF	SWE	Jonas Thern
6	DF	BRA	Aldair
7	MF	ITA	Francesco Moriero
8	MF	ITA	Francesco Statuto
9	FW	ARG	Abel Balbo
10	FW	URU	Daniel Fonseca
11	DF	ITA	Amedeo Carboni
12	GK	ITA	Giorgio Sterchele
13	DF	ITA	Fabio Petruzzi
15	MF	ITA	Luigi Di Biagio
16	FW	SWE	Martin Dahlin

No.	Pos.	Nation	Player
17	FW	ITA	Francesco Totti
18	MF	ITA	Damiano Tommasi
19	MF	ITA	Massimiliano Cappioli
20	DF	ITA	Gabriele Grossi
21	MF	ITA	Antonio Bernardini
22	GK	ITA	Giampaolo Di Magno
22	FW	GRE	Lampros Choutos
24	FW	ITA	Marco Delvecchio
25	DF	ITA	Lorenzo Stovini
26	DF	ITA	Gianluca Berti
27	DF	ITA	Matteo Pivotto
29	MF	ITA	Daniele Conti
31	DF	RUS	Omari Tetradze
32	DF	FRA	Vincent Candela
14	MF	ITA	Daniele Beretta

=== Transfers ===
In
Pos.	Name	from	Type
MF	Damiano Tommasi	Hellas Verona	
DF	Roberto Trotta	Velez Sarsfield	
FW	Martin Dahlin	Borussia Mönchengladbach	
DF	Matteo Pivotto	Carpi	
MF	Antonino Bernardini	Torino	

Out
Pos.	Name	To	Type
MF	Giuseppe Giannini	Sturm Graz	
MF	Massimiliano Cappioli	Udinese Calcio	
MF	Daniele Berretta	Cagliari Calcio	
DF	Gianluca Cherubini	A.C. Reggiana	
DF	Gabriele Grossi	A.C. Reggiana	
DF	Andrea Cupi	Lodigiani	
MF	Alessio Scarchilli	Torino	

==== Winter ====
In
Pos.	Name	from	Type
DF	Vincent Candela	En Avant Guingamp	
GK	Gianluca Berti	Genoa C.F.C.	free
DF	Omari Tetradze	Alania	free

Out
Pos.	Name	To	Type
GK	Giorgio Sterchele	Cagliari Calcio	
DF	Roberto Trotta	CA River Plate	
FW	Martin Dahlin	Borussia Mönchengladbach	loan

== Competitions ==
=== Overall ===
Competition	Started round	Final position	First match	Last match
Serie A	Matchday 1	13th	7 September 1996	1 June 1997
Coppa Italia	Second round	Second round	28 August 1996	
UEFA Cup	First round	Second round	12 September 1996	29 October 1996

Last updated: 1 June 1997

=== Serie A ===
==== League table ====
Pos	Team	Pld	W	D	L	GF	GA	GD	Pts	Qualification or relegation
10	Atalanta	34	11	11	12	44	46	−2	44	
11	Milan	34	11	10	13	43	45	−2	43	
12	Roma	34	10	11	13	46	47	−1	41 (Note: Roma finished ahead of Napoli on Goal difference: Roma -1, Napoli -7.)	
13	Napoli	34	9	14	11	38	45	−7	41	
14	Piacenza	34	7	16	11	29	45	−16	37 (Note: CAG: 7 pts; PIA: 5 pts; PER: 4 pts.)	Relegation tie-breaker

Source: Serie A, RSSSF.com, Soccerway
Rules for classification: 1) Points; 2) Head-to-head points; 3) Head-to-head goal difference; 4) Goal difference; 5) Goals scored; 6) Draw. (Note: Head-to-head record is used only after all the matches between the teams in question have been played).

==== Results summary ====
Overall								Home						Away					
Pld	W	D	L	GF	GA	GD	Pts	W	D	L	GF	GA	GD	W	D	L	GF	GA	GD
34	10	11	13	46	47	−1	41	7	6	4	30	25	+5	3	5	9	16	22	−6

Last updated: 1 June 1997.
Source: Competitive matches

==== Results by round ====
Round	1	2	3	4	5	6	7	8	9	10	11	12	13	14	15	16	17	18	19	20	21	22	23	24	25	26	27	28	29	30	31	32	33	34
Ground	H	A	H	A	H	A	H	A	H	A	H	A	H	H	A	H	A	A	H	A	H	A	H	A	H	A	H	A	H	A	A	H	A	H
Result	W	W	L	D	W	L	D	L	W	D	D	D	W	L	L	W	L	D	W	W	D	D	W	L	D	L	L	L	D	L	W	D	L	L
Position	4	1	8	6	2	4	6	6	7	7	7	8	6	9	11	8	11	11	10	8	6	6	5	7	8	7	10	12	12	12	10	10	11	12

Updated to match(es) played on 1 June 1997. Source: Competitive matches
A = Away; H = Home; W = Win; D = Draw; L = Loss; = Leader, 1997–98 UEFA Champions League Group stage; = 1997–98 UEFA Champions League Second Qualifying round; = 1997–98 UEFA Cup First round

==== Matches ====
7 September 1996 1	Roma	3–1	Piacenza	Rome
	Aldair 13'; Balbo 38'; Fonseca 73'	Report	Luiso 50' (pen.)	Stadium: Stadio Olimpico; Referee: Roberto Bettin

15 September 1996 2	Vicenza	0–2	Roma	Vicenza
		Report	Fonseca 32'; Balbo 65'	Stadium: Stadio Romeo Menti; Referee: Pierluigi Collina

21 September 1996 3	Roma	1–4	Sampdoria	Rome
	Balbo 54'	Report	Aldair 64' (o.g.); Montella 73', 90'; Mancini 88'	Stadium: Stadio Olimpico; Referee: Domenico Messina

29 September 1996 4	Reggiana	1–1	Roma	Reggio Emilia
	Valencia 78'	Report	Tommasi 6'	Stadium: Stadio Giglio; Referee: Stefano Braschi

12 October 1996 5	Roma	3–0	Milan	Rome
	Totti 13'; Cappioli 19'; Balbo 90'	Report		Stadium: Stadio Olimpico; Referee: Pierluigi Pairetto

20 October 1996 6	Hellas Verona	2–1	Roma	Verona
	Giunta 31'; Orlandini 81'	Report	Delvecchio 51'	Stadium: Stadio Marc'Antonio Bentegodi; Referee: Stefano Farina

26 October 1996 7	Roma	1–1	Juventus	Rome
	Delvecchio 90'	Report	Padovano 60'	Stadium: Stadio Olimpico; Referee: Livio Bazzoli

3 November 1996 8	Bologna	3–2	Roma	Bologna
	Kolyvanov 41'; Marocchi 54'; Bresciani 78'	Report	Balbo 64' (pen.), 86' (pen.)	Stadium: Stadio Renato Dall'Ara; Referee: Gennaro Borriello

17 November 1996 9	Roma	3–1	Cagliari	Rome
	Di Biagio 32'; Balbo 58' (pen.), 80'	Report	Banchelli 71'	Stadium: Stadio Olimpico; Referee: Marcello Nicchi

24 November 1996 10	Parma	0–0	Roma	Parma
		Report		Stadium: Stadio Ennio Tardini; Referee: Emilio Pellegrino

1 December 1996 11	Roma	3–3	Fiorentina	Rome
	Balbo 15' (pen.); Delvecchio 72'; Totti 87'	Report	Rui Costa 22'; Batistuta 31', 75'	Stadium: Stadio Olimpico; Referee: Pierluigi Collina

8 December 1996 12	Lazio	0–0	Roma	Rome
		Report		Stadium: Stadio Olimpico; Referee: Pierluigi Pairetto

15 December 1996 13	Roma	1–0	Napoli	Rome
	Aldair 78'	Report		Stadium: Stadio Olimpico; Referee: Stefano Braschi

22 December 1996 14	Roma	0–2	Atalanta	Rome
		Report	Lanna 30' (o.g.); Inzaghi 36'	Stadium: Stadio Olimpico; Referee: Pasquale Rodomonti

5 January 1997 15	Internazionale	3–1	Roma	Milan
	Ganz 11'; Djorkaeff 39'; Fresi 69'	Report	Delvecchio 48'	Stadium: San Siro; Referee: Graziano Cesari

12 January 1997 16	Roma	4–1	Perugia	Rome
	Balbo 26' (pen.), 86'; Moriero 45'; Thern 68'	Report	Rapaić 36'	Stadium: Stadio Olimpico; Referee: Salvatore Racalbuto

19 January 1997 17	Udinese	1–0	Roma	Udine
	Poggi 90'	Report		Stadium: Stadio Friuli; Referee: Daniele Tombolini

26 January 1997 18	Piacenza	0–0	Roma	Piacenza
		Report		Stadium: Stadio Leonardo Garilli; Referee: Roberto Bettin

2 February 1997 19	Roma	2–0	Vicenza	Rome
	Balbo 7', 86'	Report		Stadium: Stadio Olimpico; Referee: Emilio Pellegrino

16 February 1997 20	Sampdoria	1–2	Roma	Genoa
	Montella 74'	Report	Moriero 45'; Balbo 58'	Stadium: Stadio Luigi Ferraris; Referee: Robert Anthony Boggi

23 February 1997 21	Roma	2–2	Reggiana	Rome
	Moriero 3'; Totti 9'	Report	Simutenkov 65'; Tetradze 90' (o.g.)	Stadium: Stadio Olimpico; Referee: Angelo Bonfrisco

2 March 1997 22	Milan	1–1	Roma	Milan
	Vierchowod 65'	Report	Fonseca 75'	Stadium: San Siro; Referee: Fiorenzo Treossi

9 March 1997 23	Roma	4–3	Hellas Verona	Rome
	Di Biagio 3'; Candela 44', 89'; Totti 45'	Report	Maniero 32'; Caverzan 36'; Orlandini 61'	Stadium: Stadio Olimpico; Referee: Giancarlo Lana

15 March 1997 24	Juventus	3–0	Roma	Turin
	Vieri 28', 44'; Amoruso 85'	Report		Stadium: Stadio delle Alpi; Referee: Graziano Cesari

23 March 1997 25	Roma	1–1	Bologna	Rome
	Fonseca 74'	Report	Schenardi 55'	Stadium: Stadio Olimpico; Referee: Roberto Bettin

6 April 1997 26	Cagliari	2–1	Roma	Cagliari
	Tovalieri 6'; Darío Silva 45'	Report	Carboni 24'	Stadium: Stadio Sant'Elia; Referee: Livio Bazzoli

13 April 1997 27	Roma	0–1	Parma	Rome
		Report	Crespo 44'	Stadium: Stadio Olimpico; Referee: Stefano Braschi

19 April 1997 28	Fiorentina	2–1	Roma	Florence
	Robbiati 7'; Petruzzi 36' (o.g.)	Report	Balbo 77'	Stadium: Stadio Artemio Franchi; Referee: Stefano Farina

4 May 1997 29	Roma	1–1	Lazio	Rome
	Balbo 35'	Report	Protti 90'	Stadium: Stadio Olimpico; Referee: Robert Anthony Boggi

11 May 1997 30	Napoli	1–0	Roma	Naples
	Caccia 32'	Report		Stadium: Stadio San Paolo; Referee: Emilio Pellegrino

15 May 1997 31	Atalanta	0–4	Roma	Bergamo
		Report	Di Biagio 17'; Balbo 22'; Totti 61'; Thern 78'	Stadium: Stadio Atleti Azzurri d'Italia; Referee: Pasquale Rodomonti

18 May 1997 32	Roma	1–1	Internazionale	Rome
	Statuto 55'	Report	Djorkaeff 83'	Stadium: Stadio Olimpico; Referee: Fiorenzo Treossi

25 May 1997 33	Perugia	2–0	Roma	Perugia
	Rapaić 25'; Negri 61'	Report		Stadium: Stadio Renato Curi; Referee: Domenico Messina

1 June 1997 34	Roma	0–3	Udinese	Rome
		Report	Poggi 42'; Bierhoff 45'; Bia 87'	Stadium: Stadio Olimpico; Referee: Pierluigi Pairetto

=== Coppa Italia ===
28 August 1996 Second round	Cesena	3–1	Roma	Cesena
20:30 CEST (UTC+02:00)	Hübner 3' (pen.), 87'; Agostini 74'		Fonseca 63' (pen.)	Stadium: Stadio Dino Manuzzi; Referee: Graziano Cesari

=== UEFA Cup ===
==== First round ====
10 September 1996 First leg	Roma (Italy)	3–0	(Russia) Dynamo Moscow	Rome, Italy
20:45	Tommasi 7', (yellow card) 71'; Fonseca 18', 41' (pen.); Di Biagio (yellow card) 52'	Report	Nekrasov (yellow card) 6'; Shtanyuk (red card) 53'	Stadium: Stadio Olimpico; Attendance: 60,000; Referee: Alain Sars (France)

24 September 1996 Second leg	Dynamo Moscow (Russia)	1–3 (1–6 agg.)	(Italy) Roma	Moscow, Russia
22:30	Kobelev 18' (pen.)	Report	Fonseca 45' (pen.); Tommasi 71'; Berretta 77'	Stadium: Central Dynamo Stadium; Attendance: 5,000; Referee: László Vágner (Hungary)

==== Second round ====
15 October 1996 First leg	Karlsruhe (Germany)	3–0	(Italy) Roma	Karlsruhe, Germany
19:00	Hengen (yellow card) 18'; Fink (yellow card) 30', (goal) 45', 74'; Dundee 57'	Report	Trotta (yellow card) 80'; Lanna (yellow card) 85'; Balbo (yellow card) 88'	Stadium: Wildparkstadion; Attendance: 25,000; Referee: Jorge Monteiro Coroado (Portugal)

29 October 1996 Second leg	Roma (Italy)	2–1 (2–4 agg.)	(Germany) Karlsruhe	Rome, Italy
20:45	Balbo 22', 27'; Di Biagio (yellow card) 57'; Totti (yellow card) 90'	Report	Reich (yellow card) 13'; Wittwer (yellow card) 65'; Keller 84'	Stadium: Stadio Olimpico; Attendance: 46,400; Referee: Urs Meier (Switzerland)

== Statistics ==
=== Players statistics ===
No.	Pos	Nat	Player	Total		Serie A		Coppa		UEFA	
No.	Pos	Nat	Player	Apps	Goals	Apps	Goals	Apps	Goals	Apps	Goals
1	GK	(Italy) ITA	Cervone	15	-19	15	-19	0	0	0	0
3	DF	(Italy) ITA	Lanna	29	0	22+2	0	1	0	4	0
6	DF	(Brazil) BRA	Aldair	36	2	32	2	0	0	4	0
13	DF	(Italy) ITA	Petruzzi	30	0	26+2	0	1	0	1	0
11	DF	(Italy) ITA	Carboni	24	1	23	1	0	0	1	0
18	MF	(Italy) ITA	Tommasi	34	3	26+4	1	0	0	4	2
15	MF	(Italy) ITA	Di Biagio	32	3	24+3	3	1	0	4	0
5	MF	(Sweden) SWE	Thern	28	2	25	2	1	0	2	0
8	MF	(Italy) ITA	Statuto	25	1	19+4	1	1	0	1	0
9	FW	(Argentina) ARG	Balbo	34	19	29+1	17	0	0	4	2
17	FW	(Italy) ITA	Totti	30	5	23+3	5	1	0	3	0
12	GK	(Italy) ITA	Sterchele	21	-30	16	-22	1	-3	4	-5
24	FW	(Italy) ITA	Delvecchio	30	4	15+12	4	1	0	2	0
32	DF	(France) FRA	Candela	15	2	15	2				
7	MF	(Italy) ITA	Moriero	22	3	12+9	3	1	0		
4	DF	(Italy) ITA	Annoni	16	0	11+1	0	1	0	3	0
27	DF	(Italy) ITA	Pivotto	13	0	9+4	0				
31	DF	(Russia) RUS	Tetradze	8	0	8	0				
10	FW	(Uruguay) URU	Fonseca	21	8	6+10	4	1	1	4	3
2	DF	(Argentina) ARG	Trotta	10	0	6	0	1	0	3	0
21	MF	(Italy) ITA	Bernardini	18	0	5+11	0	0	0	2	0
19	MF	(Italy) ITA	Cappioli	6	1	4	1	0	0	2	0
26	GK	(Italy) ITA	Berti	3	-3	3	-3				
16	FW	(Sweden) SWE	Dahlin	4	0	0+3	0	1	0		
14	MF	(Italy) ITA	Berretta	5	1	0+2	0	0	0	3	1
29	MF	(Italy) ITA	Conti	1	0	0+1	0				
22	GK	(Italy) ITA	Di Magno	1	0	0+1	0				
20	DF	(Italy) ITA	Grossi	2	0	0	0	0	0	2	0
22	FW	(Greece) GRE	Choutos	0	0	0	0				
25	DF	(Italy) ITA	Stovini	0	0	0	0				

- Source: http://calcio-seriea.net/presenze/1996/1120/

=== Goalscorers ===
- (Argentina) Abel Balbo 17 (5)
- (Italy) Francesco Totti 5
- (Italy) Marco Delvecchio 4
- (Uruguay) Daniel Fonseca 4
