= 1995–96 AS Roma season =

Roma
1995–96 season
- President: Franco Sensi
- Manager: Carlo Mazzone
- Stadium: Stadio Olimpico
- Serie A: 5th (In 1996–97 UEFA Cup)
- Coppa Italia: Second round
- UEFA Cup: Quarter-finals
- Top goalscorer: League: Abel Balbo (14); All: Abel Balbo (14)
Home colours	Away colours	Third colours

Associazione Sportiva Roma did not match city rivals Lazio for the fourth year running, but managed to finish in the top five of Serie A. Abel Balbo was once again the club's topscorer, but managed just 14 goals, eight less than his previous season.

== Players ==
Note: Flags indicate national team as defined under FIFA eligibility rules; some limited exceptions apply. Players may hold more than one non-FIFA nationality.

No.	Pos.	Nation	Player
1	GK	ITA	Giovanni Cervone
2	DF	ITA	Enrico Annoni
3	DF	ITA	Marco Lanna
4	DF	ITA	Fabio Petruzzi
5	DF	BRA	Aldair
6	DF	ITA	Amedeo Carboni
7	MF	ITA	Francesco Moriero
8	MF	ITA	Francesco Statuto
9	FW	ARG	Abel Balbo
10	MF	ITA	Giuseppe Giannini
11	FW	URU	Daniel Fonseca
12	GK	ITA	Giorgio Sterchele
13	MF	ITA	Luigi Di Biagio

No.	Pos.	Nation	Player
14	MF	SWE	Jonas Thern
15	MF	ITA	Alessio Scarchilli
16	MF	ITA	Gabriele Grossi
17	MF	ITA	Massimiliano Cappioli
18	MF	ITA	Daniele Berretta
19	MF	ITA	Franco Florio
20	FW	ITA	Francesco Totti
21	GK	ITA	Giampaolo Di Magno
22	FW	ITA	Marco Branca
23	DF	ITA	Gianluca Cherubini
24	FW	ITA	Marco Delvecchio
25	FW	GRE	Lampros Choutos

=== Transfers ===
In
Pos.	Name	from	Type
MF	Luigi Di Biagio	Foggia Calcio	free
FW	Marco Branca	Parma F.C.	
GK	Giorgio Sterchele	Vicenza Calcio	
DF	Gianluca Cherubini	Reggiana Calcio	
DF	Enrico Annoni	Torino	
MF	Alessio Scarchilli	Udinese Calcio	
MF	Daniele Berretta	Cagliari Calcio	loan ended

Out
Pos.	Name	To	Type
GK	Fabrizio Lorieri	Lecce	
DF	Francesco Colonnese	S.S.C. Napoli	
DF	Andrea Borsa	S.P.A.L.	
DF	Silvano Benedetti	Alessandria	
MF	Giovanni Piacentini	Fiorentina	
MF	Michele Scapicchi		
MF	Giampiero Maini	Vicenza Calcio	free
MF	Sandro Mazzoni	-	retired

==== Winter ====
In
Pos.	Name	from	Type
FW	Marco Delvecchio	Internazionale	
DF	Gabriele Grossi	Vicenza Calcio	

Out
Pos.	Name	To	Type
FW	Marco Branca	Internazionale	

== Competitions ==
=== Overall ===
Competition	Started round	Final position	First match	Last match
Serie A	Matchday 1	6th	27 August 1995	12 May 1996
Coppa Italia	Second round	Second round	30 August 1995	
UEFA Cup	First round	Quarter-finals	12 September 1995	19 March 1996

Last updated: 12 May 1996

=== Serie A ===
==== League table ====
Pos	Team	Pld	W	D	L	GF	GA	GD	Pts	Qualification or relegation
3	Lazio	34	17	8	9	66	38	+28	59	Qualification to UEFA Cup
4	Fiorentina	34	17	8	9	53	41	+12	59	Qualification to Cup Winners' Cup
5	Roma	34	16	10	8	51	34	+17	58 (Note: ROM 1-1 PAR; PAR 1-1 ROM Roma is ahead due to Goal difference.)	Qualification to UEFA Cup
6	Parma	34	16	10	8	44	31	+13	58	Qualification to UEFA Cup
7	Internazionale	34	15	9	10	51	30	+21	54	Qualification to UEFA Cup

Source: 1995–96 Serie A, RSSSF.com, Soccerway
Rules for classification: 1) Points; 2) Head-to-head points; 3) Head-to-head goal difference; 4) Goal difference; 5) Goals scored; 6) Draw. (Note: Head-to-head record is used only after all the matches between the teams in question have been played).

==== Results summary ====
Overall								Home						Away					
Pld	W	D	L	GF	GA	GD	Pts	W	D	L	GF	GA	GD	W	D	L	GF	GA	GD
34	16	10	8	51	34	+17	58	9	6	2	28	15	+13	7	4	6	23	19	+4

Last updated: 12 May 1996.
Source: Competitive matches

==== Results by round ====
Round	1	2	3	4	5	6	7	8	9	10	11	12	13	14	15	16	17	18	19	20	21	22	23	24	25	26	27	28	29	30	31	32	33	34
Ground	A	H	H	A	H	A	H	A	H	A	H	A	H	A	A	H	A	H	A	A	H	A	H	H	A	A	H	A	H	A	H	H	A	H
Result	D	L	L	W	D	D	D	W	W	L	W	D	D	W	W	D	L	W	L	L	W	L	W	D	D	W	W	W	W	L	W	D	W	W
Position	7	13	14	11	12	13	13	9	8	10	8	9	9	7	5	5	6	5	6	8	6	7	7	7	7	6	6	6	5	7	5	6	6	5

Source: Competitive matches
A = Away; H = Home; W = Win; D = Draw; L = Loss; = Leader, 1996–97 UEFA Champions League Group stage; = 1996–97 UEFA Cup First round; = 1996–97 Serie B

==== Matches ====
27 August 1995 1	Sampdoria	1–1	Roma	Genoa
20:30 CEST	Karembeu 22'	Report	Branca 24'	Stadium: Stadio Luigi Ferraris; Referee: Pierluigi Pairetto

10 September 1995 2	Roma	0–1	Atalanta	Rome
15:00 CEST		Report	Vieri 49' (pen.)	Stadium: Stadio Olimpico; Referee: Stefano Farina

17 September 1995 3	Roma	1–2	Milan	Rome
20:30 CEST	Balbo 15'	Report	Weah 45', 76'	Stadium: Stadio Olimpico; Referee: Pierluigi Collina

24 September 1995 4	Cremonese	0–1	Roma	Cremona
15:00 CET		Report	Tentoni 68' (o.g.)	Stadium: Stadio Giovanni Zini; Referee: Fiorenzo Treossi

1 October 1995 5	Roma	0–0	Lazio	Rome
20:30 CET		Report		Stadium: Stadio Olimpico; Referee: Graziano Cesari

15 October 1995 6	Torino	2–2	Roma	Turin
15:00 CET	Abedi Pele 16'; Cervone 26' (o.g.)	Report	Branca 35'; Cappioli 40'	Stadium: Stadio delle Alpi; Referee: Livio Bazzoli

22 October 1995 7	Roma	1–1	Parma	Rome
15:00 CET	Fonseca 46'	Report	D. Baggio 75'	Stadium: Stadio Olimpico; Referee: Marcello Nicchi

29 October 1995 8	Cagliari	0–2	Roma	Cagliari
14:30 CET		Report	Fonseca 14', 68'	Stadium: Stadio Sant'Elia; Referee: Robert Anthony Boggi

5 November 1995 9	Roma	2–0	Padova	Rome
	Balbo 26'; Fonseca 62'	Report		Stadium: Stadio Olimpico; Referee: Gennaro Borriello

19 November 1995 10	Piacenza	1–0	Roma	Piacenza
	Di Francesco 18'	Report		Stadium: Stadio Galleana; Referee: Roberto Bettin

26 November 1995 11	Roma	2–1	Bari	Rome
	Fonseca 69'; Totti 72'	Report	Pedone 88'	Stadium: Stadio Olimpico; Referee: Virginio Quartuccio

3 December 1995 12	Udinese	1–1	Roma	Udine
	Bierhoff 64'	Report	Balbo 90'	Stadium: Stadio Friuli; Referee: Gianni Beschin

10 December 1995 13	Roma	1–1	Vicenza	Rome
	Lopez 21' (o.g.)	Report	Viviani 41'	Stadium: Stadio Olimpico; Referee: Salvatore Racalbuto

17 December 1995 14	Napoli	0–2	Roma	Naples
		Report	Thern 13'; Delvecchio 70'	Stadium: Stadio San Paolo; Referee: Marcello Nicchi

23 December 1995 15	Juventus	0–2	Roma	Turin
		Report	Balbo 45'; Ferrara 66' (o.g.)	Stadium: Stadio delle Alpi; Referee: Pierluigi Collina

7 January 1996 16	Roma	2–2	Fiorentina	Rome
	Balbo 5', 49'	Report	Robbiati 60'; Batistuta 70'	Stadium: Stadio Olimpico; Referee: Robert Anthony Boggi

14 January 1996 17	Internazionale	2–0	Roma	Milan
	Branca 17', 66'	Report		Stadium: San Siro; Referee: Graziano Cesari

21 January 1996 18	Roma	3–1	Sampdoria	Rome
	Balbo 45' (pen.), 62', 90'	Report	Mannini 52'	Stadium: Stadio Olimpico; Referee: Stefano Braschi

28 January 1996 19	Atalanta	2–1	Roma	Bergamo
	Pisani 78'; Morfeo 83' (pen.)	Report	Delvecchio 21'	Stadium: Stadio Atleti Azzurri d'Italia; Referee: Pierluigi Pairetto

4 February 1996 20	Milan	3–1	Roma	Milan
	Weah 7'; Aldair 55' (o.g.); Panucci 86'	Report	Moriero 8'	Stadium: San Siro; Referee: Livio Bazzoli

11 February 1996 21	Roma	3–0	Cremonese	Rome
	Di Biagio 25'; Balbo 33'; Cappioli 89'	Report		Stadium: Stadio Olimpico; Referee: Pasquale Rodomonti

18 February 1996 22	Lazio	1–0	Roma	Rome
	Signori 84' (pen.)	Report		Stadium: Stadio Olimpico; Referee: Marcello Nicchi

25 February 1996 23	Roma	1–0	Torino	Rome
	Statuto 17'	Report		Stadium: Stadio Olimpico; Referee: Domenico Messina

2 March 1996 24	Parma	1–1	Roma	Parma
	Sensini 45'	Report	Fonseca 3'	Stadium: Stadio Ennio Tardini; Referee: Roberto Bettin

10 March 1996 25	Roma	1–1	Cagliari	Rome
	Balbo 18' (pen.)	Report	Oliveira 9' (pen.)	Stadium: Stadio Olimpico; Referee: Emilio Pellegrino

24 March 1996 27	Roma	2–1	Piacenza	Rome
	Delvecchio 16'; Cappioli 24'	Report	Cappelini 51'	Stadium: Stadio Olimpico; Referee: Cosimo Bolognino

31 March 1996 28	Bari	1–2	Roma	Bari
	Parente 2'	Report	Totti 51'; Statuto 64'	Stadium: Stadio San Nicola; Referee: Robert Anthony Boggi

6 April 1996 29	Roma	2–1	Udinese	Rome
	Delvecchio 18'; Moriero 55'	Report	Marino 90'	Stadium: Stadio Olimpico; Referee: Gennaro Borriello

10 April 1996 26	Padova	1–2	Roma	Padua
	Vlaović 83'	Report	Fonseca 45'; Cappioli 82'	Stadium: Stadio Euganeo; Referee: Virginio Quartuccio

14 April 1996 30	Vicenza	2–1	Roma	Vicenza
	Otero 28'; Murgita 81'	Report	Fonseca 44' (pen.)	Stadium: Stadio Romeo Menti; Referee: Alfredo Trentalange

20 April 1996 31	Roma	4–1	Napoli	Rome
	Delvecchio 41', 81', 85'; André Cruz 50' (o.g.)	Report	Pecchia 72'	Stadium: Stadio Olimpico; Referee: Fiorenzo Treossi

28 April 1996 32	Roma	2–2	Juventus	Rome
	Delvecchio 4'; Moriero 54'	Report	Cappioli 62' (o.g.); Padovano 72'	Stadium: Stadio Olimpico; Referee: Pierluigi Collina

5 May 1996 33	Fiorentina	1–4	Roma	Florence
	Batistuta 9'	Report	Balbo 19' (pen.), 34' (pen.); Delvecchio 27', 90'	Stadium: Stadio Artemio Franchi; Referee: Emilio Pellegrino

12 May 1996 34	Roma	1–0	Internazionale	Rome
	Di Biagio 44' (pen.)	Report		Stadium: Stadio Olimpico; Referee: Graziano Cesari

=== Coppa Italia ===
30 August 1995 Second round	Bologna	1–0	Roma	Bologna
	Morello 53'			Stadium: Stadio Renato Dall'Ara; Referee: Marcello Nicchi

=== UEFA Cup ===
==== First round ====
12 September 1995 First leg	Neuchâtel Xamax (Switzerland)	1–1	(Italy) Roma	Neuchâtel, Switzerland
20:30	Jeanneret 14'; Pană (yellow card) 58'	Report	Moriero 20'; Branca (yellow card) 69'	Stadium: Stade de la Maladière; Referee: David Elleray (England)

26 September 1995 Second leg	Roma (Italy)	4–0 (5–1 agg.)	(Switzerland) Neuchâtel Xamax	Rome, Italy
19:00	Statuto (yellow card) 15'; Balbo 26', 36'; Fonseca 32'; Rueda 55' (o.g.)	Report	Bonalair (yellow card) 10'	Stadium: Stadio Olimpico; Referee: Marnix Sandra (Belgium)

==== Second round ====
17 October 1995 First leg	Roma (Italy)	4–0	(Belgium) Eendracht Aalst	Rome, Italy
20:30	Moriero 5'; Cappioli 51'; Balbo 69'; Totti 77'	Report		Stadium: Stadio Olimpico; Referee: Sándor Varga (Hungary)

31 October 1995 Second leg	Eendracht Aalst (Belgium)	0–0 (0–4 agg.)	(Italy) Roma	Aalst, Belgium
	Van Riel (yellow card) 5'	Report	Cappioli (yellow card) 37'; Statuto (yellow card) 80'	Stadium: Pierre Cornelisstadion; Referee: Karl-Erik Nilsson (Sweden)

==== Third round ====
21 November 1995 First leg	Brøndby (Denmark)	2–1	(Italy) Roma	Brøndby, Denmark
20:30	Nielsen (yellow card) 10'; Risager (yellow card) 13', (goal) 45'; Bjur 89'	Report	Fonseca 16'; Aldair (yellow card) 26'; Annoni (yellow card) 44'; Moriero (yellow card) 45'; Petruzzi (yellow card) 58'	Stadium: Brøndby Stadium; Referee: Rémi Harrel (France)

5 December 1995 Second leg	Roma (Italy)	3–1 (4–3 agg.)	(Denmark) Brøndby	Rome, Italy
20:45	Totti 22'; Balbo 72'; Carboni 90'	Report	Bjur 84'	Stadium: Stadio Olimpico; Referee: Bernd Heynemann (Germany)

==== Quarter-finals ====
5 March 1996 First leg	Slavia Prague (Czech Republic)	2–0	(Italy) Roma	Prague, Czech Republic
20:30	Poborský 10'; Vágner 50'	Report	Totti (yellow card) 63'; Statuto (yellow card) 78'; Petruzzi (red card) 80'	Referee: Leslie Mottram (Scotland)

19 March 1996 Second leg	Roma (Italy)	3–1 (a.e.t.) (3–3a agg.)	(Czech Republic) Slavia Prague	Rome, Italy
20:30	Carboni (yellow card) 57'; Moriero 61', 100', (yellow card) 101'; Di Biagio (yellow card) 62'; Statuto (yellow card) 76'; Giannini 81', (yellow card) 82'	Report	Pěnička (yellow card) 12'; Suchopárek (yellow card) 31'; Stejskal (yellow card) 78'; Vágner (yellow card) 99'; Novotný (yellow card) 103'; Vávra 113'	Stadium: Stadio Olimpico; Referee: Atanas Ouzounov (Bulgaria)

== Statistics ==
=== Players statistics ===
No.	Pos	Nat	Player	Total		Serie A		Coppa Italia		UEFA Cup	
No.	Pos	Nat	Player	Apps	Goals	Apps	Goals	Apps	Goals	Apps	Goals
1	GK	(Italy) ITA	Cervone	41	-40	33	-33	0	-0	8	-7
3	DF	(Italy) ITA	Lanna	41	0	32	0	1	0	8	0
4	DF	(Italy) ITA	Petruzzi	35	0	28	0	1	0	6	0
5	DF	(Brazil) BRA	Aldair	39	0	31	0	1	0	7	0
6	DF	(Italy) ITA	Carboni	35	1	29	0	0	0	6	1
7	MF	(Italy) ITA	Moriero	34	7	19+8	3	0	0	7	4
8	MF	(Italy) ITA	Statuto	39	2	29+2	2	1	0	7	0
14	MF	(Sweden) SWE	Thern	25	1	20+2	1	1	0	2	0
17	MF	(Italy) ITA	Cappioli	40	5	23+8	4	1	0	8	1
9	FW	(Argentina) ARG	Balbo	34	17	23+3	13	1	0	7	4
20	FW	(Italy) ITA	Totti	36	4	20+8	2	1	0	7	2
12	GK	(Italy) ITA	Sterchele	2	-2	1	-1	1	-1	0	0
13	MF	(Italy) ITA	Di Biagio	37	2	19+11	2	1	0	6	0
24	FW	(Italy) ITA	Delvecchio	24	10	18+6	10				
11	FW	(Uruguay) URU	Fonseca	29	10	17+6	8	0	0	6	2
10	MF	(Italy) ITA	Giannini	24	1	13+7	0	1	0	3	1
2	DF	(Italy) ITA	Annoni	30	0	12+11	0	0	0	7	0
22	FW	(Italy) ITA	Branca	11	2	3+4	2	1	0	3	0
15	MF	(Italy) ITA	Scarchilli	10	0	2+5	0	0	0	3	0
23	DF	(Italy) ITA	Cherubini	9	0	1+4	0	1	0	3	0
18	MF	(Italy) ITA	Berretta	4	0	1+2	0	0	0	1	0
25	FW	(Greece) GRE	Choutos	1	0	0+1	0	0	0	0	0
21	GK	(Italy) ITA	Di Magno	0	0	0	0				
19	MF	(Italy) ITA	Florio	0	0	0	0				

- Source: http://calcio-seriea.net/presenze/1995/1103/
