= 1997–98 AS Roma season =

Roma
1997–98 season
- President: Franco Sensi
- Manager: Zdeněk Zeman
- Stadium: Stadio Olimpico
- Serie A: 4th
- Coppa Italia: Quarter-finals
- Top goalscorer: League: Abel Balbo (14); All: Abel Balbo, Paulo Sérgio (14)
Home colours	Away colours	Third colours

Associazione Sportiva Roma was reinvigorated under new coach Zdeněk Zeman, who recently had been coaching arch rivals Lazio. Zeman brought his attacking 4–3–3 with him, resulting in Roma scoring 67 goals, but also conceding 42, an extreme rarity in defensive-minded Italian football. Roma finished fourth, three places above Lazio in the table. That was the first time it had happened in five years, which delighted the Roma board, and Zeman stayed on for a further season. The season also saw the international breakthrough of former youth-team product Francesco Totti, who at 21 was ready for increased responsibility and captaincy, responding with 13 league goals from a position on the left wing of the attack. Also noticeable was new signing Cafu's offensive skills as a right-wing back, granting him a reputation among the world's top wing backs.

== Players ==
Note: Flags indicate national team as defined under FIFA eligibility rules; some limited exceptions apply. Players may hold more than one non-FIFA nationality.

No.	Pos.	Nation	Player
1	GK	AUT	Michael Konsel
2	DF	BRA	Cafu
3	DF	ITA	Filippo Dal Moro
4	MF	ITA	Luigi Di Biagio
5	DF	FRA	Vincent Candela
6	DF	BRA	Aldair
7	FW	BRA	Paulo Sérgio
8	MF	ITA	Christian Scapolo
9	FW	ARG	Abel Balbo
10	FW	ITA	Francesco Totti
11	MF	ITA	Eusebio Di Francesco
12	GK	ITA	Antonio Chimenti
13	MF	BRA	Vágner Rogério Nunes

No.	Pos.	Nation	Player
14	FW	GRE	Lampros Choutos
15	DF	ITA	Christian Servidei
16	DF	ITA	Matteo Pivotto
17	MF	ITA	Damiano Tommasi
18	DF	ESP	Iván Helguera
19	MF	ITA	Carmine Gautieri
21	DF	RUS	Omari Tetradze
22	DF	ESP	César Gómez
23	GK	ITA	Andrea Campagnolo
24	FW	ITA	Marco Delvecchio
25	DF	ITA	Fabio Petruzzi
30	DF	BRA	Antônio Carlos Zago

=== Transfers ===
In
Pos.	Name	from	Type
DF	Cafu	Palmeiras	€7.60 million
FW	Paulo Sérgio	Bayer Leverkusen	€3.50 million
MF	Eusebio Di Francesco	Piacenza Calcio	
GK	Antonio Chimenti	Salernitana	
GK	Michael Konsel	Rapid Wien	
GK	Andrea Campagnolo	Cittadella	
DF	César Gómez	CD Tenerife	
DF	Giorgio Lucenti	Palermo F.C.	
DF	Iván Helguera	Albacete Balompie	
DF	Cristian Servidei	Lecce	
DF	Filippo Dal Moro	Empoli F.C.	
MF	Vágner	Santos Futebol Clube	
MF	Cristiano Scapolo	Bologna F.C.	
FW	Carmine Gautieri	Perugia Calcio	

Out
Pos.	Name	To	Type
FW	Daniel Fonseca	Juventus	€4.70 million
DF	Amedeo Carboni	Valencia CF	€4.00 million
DF	Marco Lanna	UD Salamanca	end of contract
MF	Francesco Moriero	A.C. Milan	end of contract
MF	Jonas Thern	Glasgow Rangers	end of contract
GK	Giovanni Cervone	Brescia Calcio	
GK	Giorgio Sterchele	Bologna F.C.	
MF	Francesco Statuto	Udinese Calcio	
GK	Gianluca Berti	A.C. Reggiana	
GK	Giampaolo Di Magno	Carpi	
DF	Enrico Annoni	Celtic Glasgow	
DF	Lorenzo Stovini	Vicenza Calcio	
MF	Antonino Bernardini	Perugia Calcio	
FW	Martin Dahlin	Blackburn Rovers	€3.0 million

==== Winter ====
In
Pos.	Name	from	Type
DF	Antonio Carlos	SC Corinthians	

Out
Pos.	Name	To	Type
DF	Giorgio Lucenti	Empoli F.C.	loan
FW	Andrea Conti	Carpi	
DF	Francesco Colonnese	Internazionale	€1.50 million

== Competitions ==
=== Overall ===
Competition	Started round	Final position	First match	Last match
Serie A	Matchday 1	4th	31 August 1997	16 May 1998
Coppa Italia	Round of 32	Quarter-finals	3 September 1997	21 January 1998

Last updated: 16 May 1998

=== Serie A ===
==== League table ====
Pos	Team	Pld	W	D	L	GF	GA	GD	Pts	Qualification or relegation
2	Internazionale	34	21	6	7	62	27	+35	69	Qualification to Champions League second qualifying round
3	Udinese	34	19	7	8	62	40	+22	64	Qualification to UEFA Cup
4	Roma	34	16	11	7	67	42	+25	59	Qualification to UEFA Cup
5	Fiorentina	34	15	12	7	65	36	+29	57 (Note: Fiorentina finished ahead of Parma on head-to-head points: FIO 1–1 PAR; PAR 1–2 FIO.)	Qualification to UEFA Cup
6	Parma	34	15	12	7	55	39	+16	57	Qualification to UEFA Cup

Source: 1997–98 Serie A, RSSSF.com, Soccerway
Rules for classification: 1) Points; 2) Head-to-head points; 3) Head-to-head goal difference; 4) Goal difference; 5) Goals scored; 6) Draw. (Note: Head-to-head record is used only after all the matches between the teams in question have been played).

==== Results summary ====
Overall								Home						Away					
Pld	W	D	L	GF	GA	GD	Pts	W	D	L	GF	GA	GD	W	D	L	GF	GA	GD
34	16	11	7	67	42	+25	59	10	4	3	44	21	+23	6	7	4	23	21	+2

Last updated: 16 May 1998.
Source: Competitive matches

==== Results by round ====
Round	1	2	3	4	5	6	7	8	9	10	11	12	13	14	15	16	17	18	19	20	21	22	23	24	25	26	27	28	29	30	31	32	33	34
Ground	A	H	H	A	H	A	H	A	H	A	H	A	A	H	A	H	A	H	A	A	H	A	H	A	H	A	H	A	H	H	A	H	A	H
Result	W	D	W	D	W	D	L	W	D	W	W	L	D	L	D	D	D	W	L	W	W	W	W	L	W	D	D	W	L	W	L	W	D	W
Position	2	5	4	4	2	4	4	4	4	3	3	5	5	5	7	7	8	7	8	8	7	7	5	6	5	5	5	4	5	4	6	6	6	4

Source: Competitive matches
A = Away; H = Home; W = Win; D = Draw; L = Loss; P = Postponed; = Leader, 1998–99 UEFA Champions League Group stage; = 1998–99 UEFA Champions League Second Qualifying round; = 1998–99 UEFA Cup First round; = Qualification to Intertoto Cup; = 1998–99 Serie B

==== Matches ====
31 August 1997 1	Empoli	1–3	Roma	Empoli
	Cappellini 16' (pen.)	Report	Delvecchio 3'; Balbo 46', 61'	Stadium: Stadio Carlo Castellani; Referee: Stefano Farina

14 September 1997 2	Roma	0–0	Juventus	Rome
		Report		Stadium: Stadio Olimpico; Referee: Fiorenzo Treossi

21 September 1997 3	Roma	3–1	Lecce	Rome
	Totti 3'; Di Biagio 17'; Balbo 68'	Report	Palmieri 10'	Stadium: Stadio Olimpico; Referee: Daniele Tombolini

28 September 1997 4	Bologna	0–0	Roma	Bologna
		Report		Stadium: Stadio Renato Dall'Ara; Referee: Roberto Bettin

5 October 1997 5	Roma	6–2	Napoli	Rome
	Candela 16'; Gautieri 34'; Balbo 51', 60', 89'; Di Francesco 53'	Report	Altomare 71'; Bellucci 87' (pen.)	Stadium: Stadio Olimpico; Referee: Alfredo Trentalange

19 October 1997 6	Fiorentina	0–0	Roma	Florence
		Report		Stadium: Stadio Artemio Franchi; Referee: Robert Anthony Boggi

1 November 1997 7	Roma	1–3	Lazio	Rome
	Delvecchio 90+1'	Report	Mancini 47'; Casiraghi 57'; Nedvěd 85'	Stadium: Stadio Olimpico; Referee: Pierluigi Collina

9 November 1997 8	Bari	1–3	Roma	Bari
	Volpi 36'	Report	Totti 10', 58'; Balbo 34'	Stadium: Stadio San Nicola; Referee: Pierluigi Pairetto

23 November 1997 9	Roma	2–2	Vicenza	Rome
	Balbo 28'; Paulo Sérgio 44'	Report	Luiso 1'; Ambrosetti 45+2'	Stadium: Stadio Olimpico; Referee: Graziano Cesari

30 November 1997 10	Parma	0–2	Roma	Parma
		Report	Totti 9'; Paulo Sérgio 22'	Stadium: Stadio Ennio Tardini; Referee: Stefano Braschi

7 December 1997 11	Roma	3–0	Atalanta	Rome
	Carrera 23' (o.g.); Totti 27'; Paulo Sérgio 32'	Report		Stadium: Stadio Olimpico; Referee: Stefano Farina

14 December 1997 12	Internazionale	3–0	Roma	Milan
	Djorkaeff 40' (pen.); Branca 49'; Petruzzi 71' (o.g.)	Report		Stadium: San Siro; Referee: Domenico Messina

21 December 1997 13	Brescia	1–1	Roma	Brescia
	Hübner 15'	Report	Paulo Sérgio 90+5'	Stadium: Stadio Mario Rigamonti; Referee: Piero Ceccarini

4 January 1998 14	Roma	1–2	Udinese	Rome
	Balbo 59' (pen.)	Report	Bierhoff 49', 56'	Stadium: Stadio Olimpico; Referee: Pierluigi Collina

11 January 1998 15	Milan	0–0	Roma	Milan
		Report		Stadium: San Siro; Referee: Fiorenzo Treossi

18 January 1998 16	Roma	1–1	Piacenza	Rome
	Aldair 6'	Report	Rastelli 85'	Stadium: Stadio Olimpico; Referee: Emilio Pellegrino

25 January 1998 17	Sampdoria	1–1	Roma	Genoa
	Mihajlović 33'	Report	Mannini 26' (o.g.)	Stadium: Stadio Luigi Ferraris; Referee: Alfredo Trentalange

1 February 1998 18	Roma	4–3	Empoli	Rome
	Balbo 22', 74', 87' (pen.); Aldair 73'	Report	Bonomi 60'; Cappellini 85', 88'	Stadium: Stadio Olimpico; Referee: Roberto Bettin

8 February 1998 19	Juventus	3–1	Roma	Turin
	Zidane 45+2'; Del Piero 49'; Davids 65'	Report	Paulo Sérgio 57'	Stadium: Stadio delle Alpi; Referee: Domenico Messina

11 February 1998 20	Lecce	1–3	Roma	Lecce
	Atelkin 77'	Report	Balbo 42' (pen.); Di Biagio 45+3'; Gautieri 86'	Stadium: Stadio Via del Mare; Referee: Salvatore Racalbuto

15 February 1998 21	Roma	2–1	Bologna	Rome
	Di Francesco 5'; Delvecchio 87'	Report	Kolyvanov 9'	Stadium: Stadio Olimpico; Referee: Piero Ceccarini

22 February 1998 22	Napoli	0–2	Roma	Naples
		Report	Totti 54'; Di Biagio 62'	Stadium: Stadio San Paolo; Referee: Livio Bazzoli

1 March 1998 23	Roma	4–1	Fiorentina	Rome
	Paulo Sérgio 12'; Delvecchio 32', 41'; Totti 56'	Report	Batistuta 71'	Stadium: Stadio Olimpico; Referee: Fiorenzo Treossi

8 March 1998 24	Lazio	2–0	Roma	Rome
	Bokšić 50'; Nedvěd 62'	Report		Stadium: Stadio Olimpico; Referee: Robert Anthony Boggi

15 March 1998 25	Roma	2–1	Bari	Rome
	Paulo Sérgio 2'; Aldair 78'	Report	Zambrotta 51'	Stadium: Stadio Olimpico; Referee: Tarcisio Serena

22 March 1998 26	Vicenza	1–1	Roma	Vicenza
	Luiso 24'	Report	Balbo 12'	Stadium: Stadio Romeo Menti; Referee: Pierluigi Collina

29 March 1998 27	Roma	2–2	Parma	Rome
	Totti 10'; Paulo Sérgio 25'	Report	Chiesa 26', 53'	Stadium: Stadio Olimpico; Referee: Gennaro Borriello

5 April 1998 28	Atalanta	0–1	Roma	Bergamo
		Report	Di Francesco 3'	Stadium: Stadio Atleti Azzurri d'Italia; Referee: Piero Ceccarini

11 April 1998 29	Roma	1–2	Internazionale	Rome
	Cafu 63'	Report	Ronaldo 50', 75'	Stadium: Stadio Olimpico; Referee: Graziano Cesari

19 April 1998 30	Roma	5–0	Brescia	Rome
	Di Biagio 25' (pen.), 69'; Paulo Sérgio 33', 66'; Totti 55'	Report		Stadium: Stadio Olimpico; Referee: Alfredo Trentalange

26 April 1998 31	Udinese	4–2	Roma	Udine
	Bierhoff 23', 89'; Calori 59'; Poggi 74'	Report	Totti 45', 73'	Stadium: Stadio Friuli; Referee: Livio Bazzoli

3 May 1998 32	Roma	5–0	Milan	Rome
	Candela 16'; Di Biagio 20' (pen.), 28'; Paulo Sérgio 39'; Delvecchio 82'	Report		Stadium: Stadio Olimpico; Referee: Stefano Farina

10 May 1998 33	Piacenza	3–3	Roma	Piacenza
	Piovani 45' (pen.); Murgita 58'; Valtolina 90+4'	Report	Di Francesco 45+1'; Totti 52' (pen.); Paulo Sérgio 86'	Stadium: Stadio Leonardo Garilli; Referee: Stefano Braschi

16 May 1998 34	Roma	2–0	Sampdoria	Rome
	Totti 24'; Delvecchio 90+1'	Report		Stadium: Stadio Olimpico; Referee: Cosimo Bolognino

=== Coppa Italia ===
==== Second round ====
3 September 1997 First leg	Roma	5–3	Hellas Verona	Rome
20:30 CEST (UTC+02:00)	Balbo 24' (pen.); Aldair 40'; Di Biagio 52'; Di Francesco 64'; Gonnella 84' (o.g.)		Aglietti 25', 43'; Vanoli 62'	Stadium: Stadio Olimpico; Referee: Emilio Pellegrino

25 September 1997 Second leg	Hellas Verona	1–2 (4–7 agg.)	Roma	Verona
20:30 CEST (UTC+02:00)	Siviglia 76'		Aldair 8'; Di Biagio 59'	Stadium: Stadio Marc'Antonio Bentegodi; Referee: Piero Ceccarini

==== Round of 16 ====
15 October 1997 First leg	Udinese	2–2	Roma	Udine
20:30 CEST (UTC+02:00)	Locatelli 28'; Bierhoff 79'		Totti 65'; Gautieri 82'	Stadium: Stadio Friuli; Referee: Livio Bazzoli

20 November 1997 Second leg	Roma	2–1 (4–3 agg.)	Udinese	Rome
20:30 CET (UTC+01:00)	Paulo Sérgio 23'; Delvecchio 51'		Poggi 46'	Stadium: Stadio Olimpico; Referee: Stefano Farina

==== Quarter-finals ====
6 January 1998 First leg	Lazio	4–1	Roma	Rome
20:30 CET (UTC+01:00)	Bokšić 3'; Jugović 33' (pen.); Mancini 75'; Fuser 81'		Balbo 39' (pen.)	Stadium: Stadio Olimpico; Referee: Pasquale Rodomonti

21 January 1998 Second leg	Roma	1–2 (6–2 agg.)	Lazio	Rome
20:30 CET (UTC+01:00)	Paulo Sérgio 54'		Jugović 45' (pen.); Gottardi 90'	Stadium: Stadio Olimpico; Referee: Cosimo Bolognino

== Statistics ==
=== Players statistics ===
No.	Pos	Nat	Player	Total		Serie A		Coppa	
No.	Pos	Nat	Player	Apps	Goals	Apps	Goals	Apps	Goals
1	GK	(Austria) AUT	Konsel	34	-47	29	-37	5	-10
2	DF	(Brazil) BRA	Cafu	36	1	31	1	5	0
25	DF	(Italy) ITA	Petruzzi	30	0	22+3	0	5	0
6	DF	(Brazil) BRA	Aldair	34	5	28	3	6	2
5	DF	(France) FRA	Candela	38	2	32	2	6	0
17	MF	(Italy) ITA	Tommasi	39	0	28+5	0	6	0
4	MF	(Italy) ITA	Di Biagio	36	9	30	7	6	2
11	MF	(Italy) ITA	Di Francesco	38	5	32+1	4	5	1
10	FW	(Italy) ITA	Totti	36	14	30	13	6	1
7	FW	(Brazil) BRA	Paulo Sérgio	40	14	28+6	12	6	2
9	FW	(Argentina) ARG	Balbo	31	16	27+1	14	3	2
12	GK	(Italy) ITA	Chimenti	9	-8	5+3	-5	1	-3
30	DF	(Brazil) BRA	Zago	12	0	12	0		
24	FW	(Italy) ITA	Delvecchio	32	8	10+17	7	5	1
19	MF	(Italy) ITA	Gautieri	22	3	7+11	2	4	1
13	MF	(Brazil) BRA	Vágner	16	0	5+6	0	5	0
18	DF	(Spain) ESP	Helguera	10	0	5+4	0	1	0
3	DF	(Italy) ITA	Dal Moro	8	0	5+2	0	1	0
15	DF	(Italy) ITA	Servidei	9	0	4+2	0	3	0
16	DF	(Italy) ITA	Pivotto	7	0	2+5	0		
21	DF	(Russia) RUS	Tetradze	7	0	1+6	0		
22	DF	(Spain) ESP	Gomez	3	0	1+2	0		
8	MF	(Italy) ITA	Scapolo	8	0	0+7	0	1	0
23	GK	(Italy) ITA	Campagnolo	0	0	0	0		
14	FW	(Greece) GRE	Choutos	0	0	0	0		
	DF	(Italy) ITA	Lucenti	0	0	0	0		
	MF	(Italy) ITA	Conti	0	0	0	0		
	GK	(Italy) ITA	Ficarra	0	0	0	0		

- Source: http://calcio-seriea.net/presenze/1997/1129/
