= 1994–95 AS Roma season =

Roma
1994–95 season
- President: Franco Sensi
- Manager: Carlo Mazzone
- Stadium: Olimpico
- Serie A: 5th (In 1995–96 UEFA Cup)
- Coppa Italia: Quarter-finals
- Top goalscorer: League: Abel Balbo (22); All: Abel Balbo (22)
Home colours	Away colours

Associazione Sportiva Roma was rejuvenated in Carlo Mazzone's second season as coach, much due to Abel Balbo being the goalscorer it had lacked for the previous years. The summer signings of 1994 helped, with internationally recognized players Jonas Thern and Daniel Fonseca joining the club from rivals Napoli. Also Francesco Moriero became a household player since he proved his worth in the club, recently coming from Cagliari.

== Players ==
Note: Flags indicate national team as defined under FIFA eligibility rules; some limited exceptions apply. Players may hold more than one non-FIFA nationality.

Pos.	Nation	Player
GK	ITA	Giovanni Cervone
GK	ITA	Fabrizio Lorieri
DF	ITA	Enrico Annoni
DF	ITA	Fabio Petruzzi
DF	BRA	Aldair
DF	ITA	Silvano Benedetti
DF	ITA	Amedeo Carboni
DF	ITA	Francesco Colonnese
MF	ITA	Giovanni Piacentini

Pos.	Nation	Player
MF	ITA	Francesco Moriero
MF	ITA	Francesco Statuto
MF	ITA	Giuseppe Giannini
MF	SWE	Jonas Thern
MF	ITA	Massimiliano Cappioli
FW	ARG	Abel Balbo
FW	URU	Daniel Fonseca
FW	ITA	Roberto Muzzi
FW	ITA	Francesco Totti

=== Transfers ===
In
Pos.	Name	from	Type
FW	Daniel Fonseca	S.S.C. Napoli	
MF	Francesco Moriero	Cagliari Calcio	
FW	Marco Branca	Parma F.C.	
MF	Jonas Thern	S.S.C. Napoli	
DF	Francesco Colonnese	Cremonese	
MF	Francesco Statuto	Udinese Calcio	
MF	Giampiero Maini	Ascoli	
DF	Fabio Petruzzi	Udinese Calcio	loan ended
FW	Roberto Muzzi	Pisa	loan ended

Out
Pos.	Name	To	Type
FW	Claudio Caniggia	Benfica	
DF	Siniša Mihajlović	Sampdoria	
MF	Thomas Häßler	Karlsruhe	
FW	Ruggiero Rizzitelli	Torino	
MF	Alessio Scarchilli	Udinese Calcio	
MF	Valter Bonacina	Atalanta B.C.	
DF	Gianluca Festa	Internazionale	loan ended
MF	Daniele Berretta	Cagliari Calcio	loan ended
MF	Antonino Bernardini	Torino	loan

==== Winter ====
In
Pos.	Name	from	Type

Out
Pos.	Name	To	Type
FW	Roberto Muzzi	Cagliari Calcio	free

== Competitions ==
=== Overall ===
Competition	Started round	Final position	First match	Last match
Serie A	Matchday 1	5th	4 September 1994	4 June 1995
Coppa Italia	Second round	Quarter-finals	31 August 1994	14 December 1994

Last updated: 4 June 1995

=== Serie A ===
==== League table ====
Pos	Team	Pld	W	D	L	GF	GA	GD	Pts	Qualification or relegation
3	Lazio	34	19	6	9	69	34	+35	63	Qualification to UEFA Cup
4	Milan	34	17	9	8	53	32	+21	60	Qualification to UEFA Cup
5	Roma	34	16	11	7	46	25	+21	59	Qualification to UEFA Cup
6	Internazionale	34	14	10	10	39	34	+5	52	Qualification to UEFA Cup
7	Napoli	34	13	12	9	40	45	−5	51	

Source: Serie A, RSSSF.com, Soccerway
Rules for classification: 1) Points; 2) Head-to-head points; 3) Head-to-head goal difference; 4) Goal difference; 5) Goals scored; 6) Draw. (Note: Head-to-head record is used only after all the matches between the teams in question have been played).

==== Results summary ====
Overall								Home						Away					
Pld	W	D	L	GF	GA	GD	Pts	W	D	L	GF	GA	GD	W	D	L	GF	GA	GD
34	16	11	7	46	25	+21	59	10	6	1	27	8	+19	6	5	6	19	17	+2

Last updated: 4 June 1995.
Source: Competitive matches

==== Results by round ====
Round	1	2	3	4	5	6	7	8	9	10	11	12	13	14	15	16	17	18	19	20	21	22	23	24	25	26	27	28	29	30	31	32	33	34
Ground	H	A	H	A	H	A	H	A	H	A	A	H	A	H	H	A	H	A	H	A	H	A	H	A	H	A	H	H	A	H	A	A	H	A
Result	D	W	W	W	W	D	D	L	D	D	W	W	L	D	W	L	D	W	W	L	W	L	D	W	W	D	W	L	D	W	L	D	W	W
Position	8	8	3	1	2	1	2	4	5	5	5	4	4	5	3	5	4	4	3	4	3	4	4	4	3	3	3	4	4	4	5	5	5	5

Source: Competitive matches
A = Away; H = Home; W = Win; D = Draw; L = Loss; = Leader, 1995–96 UEFA Champions League Group stage; = 1995–96 UEFA Cup First round

==== Matches ====
4 September 1994 1	Roma	1–1	Foggia	Rome
	Totti 30'	Report	Kolyvanov 67'	Stadium: Stadio Olimpico; Referee: Alfredo Trentalange

11 September 1994 2	Internazionale	0–1	Roma	Milan
		Report	Festa 77' (o.g.)	Stadium: San Siro; Referee: Gianni Beschin

18 September 1994 3	Roma	3–0	Genoa	Rome
	Balbo 8', 56'; Fonseca 89'	Report		Stadium: Stadio Olimpico; Referee: Robert Anthony Boggi

25 September 1994 4	Reggiana	1–4	Roma	Reggio Emilia
	De Agostini 53'	Report	Balbo 17' (pen.), 22'; Fonseca 64'; Moriero 75'	Stadium: Stadio Giglio; Referee: Graziano Cesari

2 October 1994 5	Roma	1–0	Sampdoria	Rome
	Balbo 56'	Report		Stadium: Stadio Olimpico; Referee: Pierluigi Pairetto

16 October 1994 6	Torino	2–2	Roma	Turin
	Rizzitelli 41'; Cristallini 78'	Report	Balbo 8'; Fonseca 70' (pen.)	Stadium: Stadio delle Alpi; Referee: Stefano Braschi

23 October 1994 7	Roma	1–1	Cagliari	Rome
	Balbo 90'	Report	Bisoli 58'	Stadium: Stadio Olimpico; Referee: Piero Ceccarini

30 October 1994 8	Parma	1–0	Roma	Parma
	Zola 89'	Report		Stadium: Stadio Ennio Tardini; Referee: Loris Stafoggia

6 November 1994 9	Roma	1–1	Napoli	Rome
	Moriero 70'	Report	Boghossian 38'	Stadium: Stadio Olimpico; Referee: Livio Bazzoli

20 November 1994 10	Brescia	0–0	Roma	Brescia
		Report		Stadium: Stadio Mario Rigamonti; Referee: Roberto Bettin

27 November 1994 11	Lazio	0–3	Roma	Rome
		Report	Balbo 2'; Cappioli 25'; Fonseca 51'	Stadium: Stadio Olimpico; Referee: Robert Anthony Boggi

4 December 1994 12	Roma	2–0	Padova	Rome
	Aldair 66'; Cappioli 81'	Report		Stadium: Stadio Olimpico; Referee: Fiorenzo Treossi

11 December 1994 13	Fiorentina	1–0	Roma	Florence
	Carboni 73' (o.g.)	Report		Stadium: Stadio Artemio Franchi; Referee: Angelo Amendolia

18 December 1994 14	Roma	0–0	Milan	Rome
		Report		Stadium: Stadio Olimpico; Referee: Pierluigi Collina

8 January 1995 15	Roma	2–0	Bari	Rome
	Balbo 69'; Totti 86'	Report		Stadium: Stadio Olimpico; Referee: Graziano Cesari

15 January 1995 16	Juventus	3–0	Roma	Turin
	Ravanelli 32', 81' (pen.); Vialli 84'	Report		Stadium: Stadio delle Alpi; Referee: Loris Stafoggia

22 January 1995 17	Roma	1–1	Cremonese	Rome
	Lanna 63'	Report	Chiesa 39'	Stadium: Stadio Olimpico; Referee: Roberto Bettin

29 January 1995 18	Foggia	0–1	Roma	Foggia
		Report	Balbo 2'	Stadium: Stadio Pino Zaccheria; Referee: Pasquale Rodomonti

12 February 1995 19	Roma	3–1	Internazionale	Rome
	Balbo 4', 30', 71'	Report	Seno 14'	Stadium: Stadio Olimpico; Referee: Stefano Braschi

19 February 1995 20	Genoa	1–0	Roma	Genoa
	Skuhravý 15'	Report		Stadium: Stadio Luigi Ferraris; Referee: Pierluigi Pairetto

26 February 1995 21	Roma	2–0	Reggiana	Rome
	Giannini 48'; Balbo 70' (pen.)	Report		Stadium: Stadio Olimpico; Referee: Francesco Arena

5 March 1995 22	Sampdoria	3–0	Roma	Genoa
	Rossi 26'; Gullit 47', 77'	Report		Stadium: Stadio Luigi Ferraris; Referee: Alfredo Trentalange

12 March 1995 23	Roma	1–1	Torino	Rome
	Fonseca 40'	Report	Rizzitelli 8'	Stadium: Stadio Olimpico; Referee: Angelo Amendolia

19 March 1995 24	Cagliari	0–1	Roma	Cagliari
		Report	Balbo 18' (pen.)	Stadium: Stadio Sant'Elia; Referee: Robert Anthony Boggi

1 April 1995 25	Roma	1–0	Parma	Rome
	Balbo 23'	Report		Stadium: Stadio Olimpico; Referee: Pierluigi Collina

9 April 1995 26	Napoli	0–0	Roma	Naples
		Report		Stadium: Stadio San Paolo; Referee: Marcello Nicchi

15 April 1995 27	Roma	3–0	Brescia	Rome
	Totti 5'; Cappioli 18'; Balbo 79' (pen.)	Report		Stadium: Stadio Olimpico; Referee: Stefano Farina

23 April 1995 28	Roma	0–2	Lazio	Rome
		Report	Casiraghi 30'; Signori 71' (pen.)	Stadium: Stadio Olimpico; Referee: Angelo Amendolia

30 April 1995 29	Padova	0–0	Roma	Padua
		Report		Stadium: Stadio Euganeo; Referee: Livio Bazzoli

7 May 1995 30	Roma	2–0	Fiorentina	Rome
	Balbo 15'; Totti 81'	Report		Stadium: Stadio Olimpico; Referee: Pasquale Rodomonti

14 May 1995 31	Milan	1–0	Roma	Milan
	Lentini 34'	Report		Stadium: San Siro; Referee: Graziano Cesari

21 May 1995 32	Bari	2–2	Roma	Bari
	Tovalieri 54'; Protti 75'	Report	Fonseca 6', 70'	Stadium: Stadio San Nicola; Referee: Pierluigi Collina

28 May 1995 33	Roma	3–0	Juventus	Rome
	Tacchinardi 10' (o.g.); Fonseca 70' (pen.); Balbo 75'	Report		Stadium: Stadio Olimpico; Referee: Gianni Beschin

4 June 1995 34	Cremonese	2–5	Roma	Cremona
	Chiesa 25'; Sclosa 56'	Report	Balbo 12', 49', 79' (pen.); Cappioli 68', 90'	Stadium: Stadio Giovanni Zini; Referee: Daniele Tombolini

=== Coppa Italia ===
==== Second round ====
31 August 1994 First leg	Fiorenzuola	0–3	Roma	Fiorenzuola d'Arda
			Muzzi 22', 70'; Giannini 61'	Stadium: Stadio Comunale; Referee: Carlo Dinelli

22 September 1994 Second leg	Roma	2–1 (5–1 agg.)	Fiorenzuola	Rome
	Cappioli 28'; Totti 67'		Bellucci 80'	Stadium: Stadio Olimpico; Referee: Domenico Messina

==== Round of 16 ====
12 October 1994 First leg	Genoa	2–0	Roma	Genoa
	Castorina 57'; Nappi 76'			Stadium: Stadio Luigi Ferraris; Referee: Marcello Nicchi

26 October 1994 Second leg	Roma	3–0 (3–2 agg.)	Genoa	Rome
	Totti 21'; Fonseca 78', 86'			Stadium: Stadio Olimpico; Referee: Angelo Amendolia

==== Quarter-finals ====
30 November 1994 First leg	Juventus	3–0	Roma	Turin
	Vialli 22', 34'; Ravanelli 90'			Stadium: Stadio delle Alpi; Referee: Piero Ceccarini

14 December 1994 Second leg	Roma	3–1 (3–4 agg.)	Juventus	Rome
	Marocchi 21' (o.g.); Totti 36'; Cappioli 68'		Ravanelli 27' (pen.)	Stadium: Stadio Olimpico; Referee: Robert Anthony Boggi

== Statistics ==
=== Players statistics ===
No.	Pos	Nat	Player	Total		Serie A		Coppa	
No.	Pos	Nat	Player	Apps	Goals	Apps	Goals	Apps	Goals
	GK	(Italy) ITA	Giovanni Cervone	37	-27	33	-22	4	-5
	DF	(Italy) ITA	Marco Lanna	34	1	29+2	1	3	0
	DF	(Brazil) BRA	Aldair	33	1	28	1	5	0
	DF	(Italy) ITA	Fabio Petruzzi	30	0	26	0	4	0
	DF	(Italy) ITA	Amedeo Carboni	33	0	29+1	0	3	0
	MF	(Italy) ITA	Francesco Moriero	32	2	27+1	2	4	0
	MF	(Italy) ITA	Giuseppe Giannini	34	2	26+2	1	6	1
	MF	(Italy) ITA	Giovanni Piacentini	34	0	21+8	0	5	0
	MF	(Italy) ITA	Massimiliano Cappioli	37	7	26+5	5	6	2
	FW	(Argentina) ARG	Abel Balbo	36	22	32	22	4	0
	FW	(Uruguay) URU	Daniel Fonseca	29	10	25+1	8	3	2
	GK	(Italy) ITA	Fabrizio Lorieri	4	-5	1+1	-3	2	-2
	FW	(Italy) ITA	Francesco Statuto	21	3	20	3	1	0
	DF	(Italy) ITA	Enrico Annoni	27	0	16+8	0	3	0
	MF	(Sweden) SWE	Jonas Thern	16	0	12	0	4	0
	FW	(Italy) ITA	Francesco Totti	25	7	11+10	4	4	3
	DF	(Italy) ITA	Silvano Benedetti	15	0	8+4	0	3	0
	MF	(Italy) ITA	Giampiero Maini	10	0	2+5	0	3	0
	DF	(Italy) ITA	Francesco Colonnese	7	0	1+4	0	2	0
	DF	(Italy) ITA	Dario Rossi	3	0	1+2	0		
	FW	(Italy) ITA	Roberto Muzzi	4	2	0+2	0	2	2
	DF	(Italy) ITA	Andrea Borsa	2	0	0+1	0	1	0
	DF	(Italy) ITA	Daniele Rossi	2	0	0	0	2	0

- Source: http://calcio-seriea.net/presenze/1994/1082/
