= 2001–02 AS Roma season =

Roma
2001–02 season
- President: Franco Sensi
- Manager: Fabio Capello
- Stadium: Stadio Olimpico
- Serie A: 2nd
- Supercoppa Italiana: Winners
- Coppa Italia: Quarter-finals
- UEFA Champions League: Second group stage
- Top goalscorer: League: Vincenzo Montella (13); All: Vincenzo Montella (15)
- Average home league attendance: 59,402
Home colours	Away colours	Third colours

Associazione Sportiva Roma failed to defend their 2001 Serie A title, and had to settle for second best, whilst being beaten by Juventus. Its main target for the season was to win the UEFA Champions League, which it failed when it got knocked out in the second group stage, rendering better form in the league when it did not have to rest players in those matches anymore. The season highlight was a crushing 5–1 win over city rivals Lazio.

== Players ==
Note: Flags indicate national team as defined under FIFA eligibility rules; some limited exceptions apply. Players may hold more than one non-FIFA nationality.

No.	Pos.	Nation	Player
1	GK	ITA	Francesco Antonioli
2	DF	BRA	Cafu
3	DF	BRA	Antônio Carlos Zago
4	DF	ARG	Leandro Cufré
5	MF	BRA	Francisco Lima
6	DF	BRA	Aldair
7	MF	ITA	Diego Fuser
8	MF	BRA	Marcos Assunção
9	FW	ITA	Vincenzo Montella
10	FW	ITA	Francesco Totti
11	MF	BRA	Emerson
12	GK	ITA	Carlo Zotti
14	DF	ITA	Christian Panucci
15	DF	FRA	Jonathan Zebina

No.	Pos.	Nation	Player
16	FW	ARG	Abel Balbo
17	MF	ITA	Damiano Tommasi
18	FW	ITA	Antonio Cassano
19	DF	ARG	Walter Samuel
20	FW	ARG	Gabriel Batistuta
21	DF	CIV	Saliou Lassissi
22	GK	ARG	Sebastián Cejas
23	MF	YUG	Ivan Tomić
24	FW	ITA	Marco Delvecchio
25	MF	URU	Gianni Guigou
27	MF	ITA	Daniele De Rossi
28	MF	ITA	Alberto Aquilani
29	DF	ITA	Sebastiano Siviglia
30	DF	ITA	Cesare Bovo
32	DF	FRA	Vincent Candela
80	GK	ITA	Ivan Pelizzoli

=== Transfers ===
In
Pos.	Name	from	Type
FW	Antonio Cassano	Bari	(U$25,0 million)
GK	Ivan Pelizzoli	Atalanta	U$13,5 million
DF	Sebastiano Siviglia	Atalanta	-
DF	Jonathan Zebina	Cagliari	co-ownership (U$6,0 million)
DF	Christian Panucci	Monaco	loan (€3,0 million)
DF	Saliou Lassissi	Parma	
MF	Diego Fuser	Parma	free
MF	Raffaele Longo	Parma	
DF	Leandro Cufré	Gimnasia	
MF	Francisco Lima	Bologna	free
FW	Gustavo Vassallo	Nice	
MF	Manuele Blasi	Perugia	loan ended
DF	Maurizio Lanzaro	Hellas Verona	loan ended
DF	Marco Quadrini	Palermo	loan ended
FW	Gustavo Bartelt	Rayo Vallecano	loan ended

Out
R.	Name	To	Type
MF	Hidetoshi Nakata	Parma	€28,4 million
DF	Amedeo Mangone	Parma	
FW	Paolo Poggi	Parma	
DF	Sergei Gurenko	Parma	
MF	Cristiano Zanetti	Internazionale	€11,0 million
MF	Manuele Blasi	Perugia	€9,81 million
MF	Gaetano D'Agostino	Bari	co-ownership (U$5,0 million)
GK	Cristiano Lupatelli	Chievo	€1,45 million
GK	Marco Amelia	Livorno	end of contract
DF	Alessandro Zamperini	Portsmouth	
DF	Alessandro Rinaldi	Atalanta	
MF	Eusebio Di Francesco	Piacenza	
DF	Marco Quadrini	Napoli	co-ownership
FW	Alessandro Tulli	Vicenza	loan
DF	Maurizio Lanzaro	Palermo	loan
MF	Daniele De Vezze	Palermo	loan
MF	Raffaele Longo	Palermo	loan
FW	Gustavo Vassallo	Palermo	loan

==== Winter ====
In
Pos.	Name	from	Type

Out
Pos.	Name	To	Type
GK	Sebastián Cejas	Siena	
FW	Daniele Martinetti	Sora	-
FW	Simone Pepe	Lecco	loan

== Kits ==
Home	Home (Champions)	Away	Third	Fourth
Goalkeeper	Goalkeeper Alt.	Goalkeeper (Champions)

== Competitions ==
=== Overall ===
Competition	Started round	Final position	First match	Last match
Serie A	Matchday 1	Runners-up	26 August 2001	5 May 2002
Supercoppa Italiana	Final	Winners	19 August 2001	
Coppa Italia	Round of 16	Quarter-finals	18 November 2001	8 January 2002
Champions League	Group stage	Second group stage	11 September 2001	19 March 2002

Last updated: 5 May 2002

=== Supercoppa Italiana ===
19 August 2001	Roma	3–0	Fiorentina	Rome
20:45 CEST (UTC+02:00)	Candela 6'; Montella 53'; Totti 83'			Stadium: Stadio Olimpico; Attendance: 61,050; Referee: Graziano Cesari

=== Serie A ===
==== League table ====
Pos	Team	Pld	W	D	L	GF	GA	GD	Pts	Qualification or relegation
1	Juventus (C)	34	20	11	3	64	23	+41	71	Qualification to Champions League first group stage
2	Roma	34	19	13	2	58	24	+34	70	Qualification to Champions League first group stage
3	Internazionale	34	20	9	5	62	35	+27	69	Qualification to Champions League third qualifying round
4	Milan	34	14	13	7	47	33	+14	55	Qualification to Champions League third qualifying round
5	Chievo	34	14	12	8	57	52	+5	54	Qualification to UEFA Cup first round

Source: 2001–02 Serie A, Soccerway
Rules for classification: 1) Points; 2) Head-to-head points; 3) Head-to-head goal difference; 4) Goal difference; 5) Goals scored; 6) Draw. (Note: Head-to-head record is used only after all the matches between the teams in question have been played).
(C) Champions

==== Results summary ====
Overall								Home						Away					
Pld	W	D	L	GF	GA	GD	Pts	W	D	L	GF	GA	GD	W	D	L	GF	GA	GD
34	19	13	2	58	24	+34	70	13	4	0	33	8	+25	6	9	2	25	16	+9

Last updated: 5 May 2002.
Source: Competitive matches

==== Results by round ====
Round	1	2	3	4	5	6	7	8	9	10	11	12	13	14	15	16	17	18	19	20	21	22	23	24	25	26	27	28	29	30	31	32	33	34
Ground	A	H	A	H	A	H	A	H	H	A	H	A	H	A	H	A	H	H	A	H	A	H	A	H	A	A	H	A	H	A	H	A	H	A
Result	D	D	L	W	W	D	D	W	W	D	D	W	W	W	W	W	W	W	D	W	D	D	D	W	D	W	W	L	W	D	W	D	W	W
Position	5	9	12	7	6	6	5	2	4	3	3	2	2	1	2	2	1	1	2	1	1	1	2	1	3	1	1	2	2	2	2	3	3	2

Source: Competitive matches
A = Away; H = Home; W = Win; D = Draw; L = Loss; = Leader, 2002–03 UEFA Champions League Group stage; = 2002–03 UEFA Champions League Group stage; = 2002–03 UEFA Champions League Second qualifying round; = 2002–03 UEFA Cup First round; = 2002 UEFA Intertoto Cup; = 2002-03 Serie B

==== Matches ====
26 August 2001 1	Hellas Verona	1–1	Roma	Verona
20:30 CEST (UTC+02:00)	Oddo 75'	Report	Samuel 45+1'	Stadium: Stadio Marc'Antonio Bentegodi; Attendance: 22,110; Referee: Stefano Farina

1 September 2001 2	Roma	1–1	Udinese	Rome
20:30 CEST (UTC+02:00)	Tommasi 66'	Report	Muzzi 90+1'	Stadium: Stadio Olimpico; Attendance: 54,412; Referee: Salvatore Racalbuto

15 September 2001 3	Piacenza	2–0	Roma	Piacenza
15:00 CEST (UTC+02:00)	Hübner 39'; Di Francesco 50'	Report		Stadium: Stadio Leonardo Garilli; Attendance: 9,965; Referee: Pierluigi Collina

22 September 2001 4	Roma	2–1	Fiorentina	Rome
15:00 CEST (UTC+02:00)	Totti 12' (pen.); Panucci 87'	Report	Adani 7'	Stadium: Stadio Olimpico; Attendance: 52,409; Referee: Domenico Messina

29 September 2001 5	Juventus	0–2	Roma	Turin
20:30 CEST (UTC+02:00)		Report	Batistuta 37'; Assunção 90+3'	Stadium: Stadio delle Alpi; Attendance: 49,454; Referee: Graziano Cesari

7 October 2001 7	Perugia	0–0	Roma	Perugia
20:30 CEST (UTC+02:00)		Report		Stadium: Stadio Renato Curi; Attendance: 21,536; Referee: Salvatore Racalbuto

20 October 2001 8	Roma	5–1	Lecce	Rome
15:00 CEST (UTC+02:00)	Totti 8', 78' (pen.); Samuel 38'; Candela 70'; Batistuta 86'	Report	Chevantón 64'	Stadium: Stadio Olimpico; Attendance: 55,617; Referee: Cosimo Bolognino

27 October 2001 9	Roma	2–0	Lazio	Rome
20:30 CEST (UTC+02:00)	Delvecchio 49'; Totti 90+2'	Report		Stadium: Stadio Olimpico; Attendance: 76,528; Referee: Graziano Cesari

3 November 2001 10	Atalanta	1–1	Roma	Bergamo
15:00 CET (UTC+01:00)	Doni 75' (pen.)	Report	Assunção 54'	Stadium: Stadio Atleti Azzurri d'Italia; Attendance: 17,705; Referee: Gennaro Borriello

11 November 2001 11	Roma	0–0	Internazionale	Rome
20:30 CET (UTC+01:00)		Report		Stadium: Stadio Olimpico; Attendance: 69,403; Referee: Roberto Rosetti

24 November 2001 12	Bologna	1–3	Roma	Bologna
15:00 CET (UTC+01:00)	Womé 38'	Report	Samuel 3'; Batistuta 16'; Assunção 40'	Stadium: Stadio Renato Dall'Ara; Attendance: 24,577; Referee: Gianluca Paparesta

2 December 2001 13	Roma	1–0	Venezia	Rome
15:00 CET (UTC+01:00)	Fuser 90+1'	Report		Stadium: Stadio Olimpico; Attendance: 53,097; Referee: Cosimo Bolognino

8 December 2001 14	Parma	1–2	Roma	Parma
15:00 CET (UTC+01:00)	Di Vaio 31'	Report	Assunção 49'; Fuser 77'	Stadium: Stadio Ennio Tardini; Attendance: 21,667; Referee: Pierluigi Collina

16 December 2001 15	Roma	1–0	Milan	Rome
20:30 CET (UTC+01:00)	Totti 44'	Report		Stadium: Stadio Olimpico; Attendance: 62,621; Referee: Pierluigi Collina

19 December 2001 6	Roma	0–0	Brescia	Rome
15:00 CET (UTC+01:00)		Report		Stadium: Stadio Olimpico; Attendance: 51,228; Referee: Daniele Tombolini

22 December 2001 16	Chievo	0–3	Roma	Verona
20:30 CET (UTC+01:00)		Report	Emerson 26'; Samuel 76'; Tommasi 90+2'	Stadium: Stadio Marc'Antonio Bentegodi; Attendance: 16,747; Referee: Graziano Cesari

6 January 2002 17	Roma	1–0	Torino	Rome
15:00 CET (UTC+01:00)	Totti 24'	Report		Stadium: Stadio Olimpico; Attendance: 55,078; Referee: Stefano Farina

13 January 2002 18	Roma	3–2	Hellas Verona	Rome
15:00 CET (UTC+01:00)	Assunção 54'; Cassano 63'; Batistuta 90'	Report	Mutu 44', 53'	Stadium: Stadio Olimpico; Attendance: 52,459; Referee: Stefano Braschi

20 January 2002 19	Udinese	1–1	Roma	Udine
15:00 CET (UTC+01:00)	Di Michele 48'	Report	Batistuta 82'	Stadium: Stadio Friuli; Attendance: 16,479; Referee: Alfredo Trentalange

27 January 2002 20	Roma	2–0	Piacenza	Rome
15:00 CET (UTC+01:00)	Assunção 15'; Batistuta 77'	Report		Stadium: Stadio Olimpico; Attendance: 53,422; Referee: Stefano Braschi

3 February 2002 21	Fiorentina	2–2	Roma	Florence
15:00 CET (UTC+01:00)	Morfeo 16'; Adriano 18'	Report	Cassano 54'; Emerson 75'	Stadium: Stadio Artemio Franchi; Attendance: 32,234; Referee: Cosimo Bolognino

10 February 2002 22	Roma	0–0	Juventus	Rome
20:30 CET (UTC+01:00)		Report		Stadium: Stadio Olimpico; Attendance: 73,161; Referee: Graziano Cesari

17 February 2002 23	Brescia	0–0	Roma	Brescia
15:00 CET (UTC+01:00)		Report		Stadium: Stadio Mario Rigamonti; Attendance: 13,629; Referee: Paolo Bertini

23 February 2002 24	Roma	1–0	Perugia	Rome
20:30 CET (UTC+01:00)	Montella 59'	Report		Stadium: Stadio Olimpico; Attendance: 54,829; Referee: Cosimo Bolognino

3 March 2002 25	Lecce	1–1	Roma	Lecce
15:00 CET (UTC+01:00)	Vugrinec 74'	Report	Candela 34'	Stadium: Stadio Via del Mare; Attendance: 18,568; Referee: Fiorenzo Treossi

10 March 2002 26	Lazio	1–5	Roma	Rome
20:30 CET (UTC+01:00)	Stanković 53'	Report	Montella 13', 30', 37', 64'; Totti 72'	Stadium: Stadio Olimpico; Attendance: 72,454; Referee: Roberto Rosetti

16 March 2002 27	Roma	3–1	Atalanta	Rome
20:30 CET (UTC+01:00)	Montella 17', 68'; Carrera 29' (o.g.)	Report	Doni 84'	Stadium: Stadio Olimpico; Attendance: 55,620; Referee: Gianluca Paparesta

24 March 2002 28	Internazionale	3–1	Roma	Milan
20:30 CET (UTC+01:00)	Recoba 2', 71'; Vieri 43'	Report	Totti 57'	Stadium: San Siro; Attendance: 78,209; Referee: Graziano Cesari

30 March 2002 29	Roma	3–1	Bologna	Rome
15:00 CET (UTC+01:00)	Montella 33'; Emerson 42', 52'	Report	Cruz 82'	Stadium: Stadio Olimpico; Attendance: 59,408; Referee: Roberto Rosetti

7 April 2002 30	Venezia	2–2	Roma	Venice
15:00 CEST (UTC+02:00)	Maniero 61'; De Franceschi 80'	Report	Montella 87' (pen.), 90' (pen.)	Stadium: Stadio Pier Luigi Penzo; Attendance: 10,982; Referee: Pierluigi Collina

14 April 2002 31	Roma	3–1	Parma	Rome
15:00 CEST (UTC+02:00)	Delvecchio 7'; Cassano 41'; Samuel 46'	Report	Lamouchi 43'	Stadium: Stadio Olimpico; Attendance: 61,870; Referee: Gianluca Paparesta

21 April 2002 32	Milan	0–0	Roma	Milan
15:00 CEST (UTC+02:00)		Report		Stadium: San Siro; Attendance: 73,524; Referee: Gianluca Paparesta

28 April 2002 33	Roma	5–0	Chievo	Rome
15:00 CEST (UTC+02:00)	Montella 25', 34', 50' (pen.); Emerson 74'; Cassano 81'	Report		Stadium: Stadio Olimpico; Attendance: 68,678; Referee: Pierluigi Collina

5 May 2002 34	Torino	0–1	Roma	Turin
15:00 CEST (UTC+02:00)		Report	Cassano 68'	Stadium: Stadio delle Alpi; Attendance: 23,060; Referee: Fiorenzo Treossi

=== Coppa Italia ===
==== Round of 16 ====
18 November 2001 First leg	Piacenza	2–1	Roma	Piacenza
15:00 CET (UTC+01:00)	Caccia 7'; Di Francesco 26'		Panucci 41'	Stadium: Stadio Leonardo Garilli; Referee: Danilo Nucini

21 November 2001 Second leg	Roma	3–0 (4–2 agg.)	Piacenza	Rome
20:30 CET (UTC+01:00)	Panucci 3'; Cassano 35'; Tommasi 40'			Stadium: Stadio Olimpico; Referee: Massimiliano Saccani

==== Quarter-finals ====
5 December 2001 First leg	Roma	0–1	Brescia	Rome
20:45 CET (UTC+01:00)			Schopp 82'	Stadium: Stadio Olimpico; Referee: Daniele Tombolini

8 January 2002 Second leg	Brescia	3–0 (4–0 agg.)	Roma	Brescia
21:00 CET (UTC+01:00)	Filippini 6'; Schopp 27'; Toni 71'			Stadium: Stadio Mario Rigamonti; Referee: Emilio Pellegrino

=== UEFA Champions League ===
==== Group stage ====
Pos	Team	Pld	W	D	L	GF	GA	GD	Pts	Qualification
1	(Spain) Real Madrid	6	4	1	1	13	5	+8	13	Advance to second group stage
2	(Italy) Roma	6	2	3	1	6	5	+1	9	Advance to second group stage
3	(Russia) Lokomotiv Moscow	6	2	1	3	9	9	0	7	Transfer to UEFA Cup
4	(Belgium) Anderlecht	6	0	3	3	4	13	−9	3	

Source: RSSSF

11 September 2001 1	Roma (Italy)	1–2	(Spain) Real Madrid	Rome, Italy
20:45 CEST (UTC+02:00)	Emerson (yellow card) 69'; Totti 73' (pen.)	Report	Karanka (yellow card) 44'; Figo 50'; Guti 63', (yellow card) 69'	Stadium: Stadio Olimpico; Attendance: 71,376; Referee: Graham Poll (England)

26 September 2001 2	Anderlecht (Belgium)	0–0	(Italy) Roma	Anderlecht, Belgium
20:45 CEST (UTC+02:00)	Vanderhaeghe (yellow card) 7'; Mornar (yellow card) 39'; Van Hout (yellow card) 81'	Report	Zago (yellow card) 11'; Cafu (yellow card) 38'	Stadium: Constant Vanden Stock Stadium; Attendance: 22,000; Referee: Karl-Erik Nilsson (Sweden)

3 October 2001 3	Roma (Italy)	2–1	(Russia) Lokomotiv Moscow	Rome, Italy
20:45 CEST (UTC+02:00)	Chugainov 69' (o.g.); Totti 79'; Zago (yellow card) 80'	Report	Obradović 59'; Pimenov (yellow card) 73'	Stadium: Stadio Olimpico; Attendance: 38,472; Referee: Hartmut Strampe (Germany)

23 October 2001 4	Lokomotiv Moscow (Russia)	0–1	(Italy) Roma	Moscow, Russia
20:45 CEST (UTC+02:00)	Obradović (yellow card) 61'	Report	Cafu 78'	Stadium: Lokomotiv Moscow; Attendance: 16,000; Referee: Dick Jol (Netherlands)

31 October 2001 5	Real Madrid (Spain)	1–1	(Italy) Roma	Madrid, Spain
20:45 CEST (UTC+02:00)	Figo (yellow card) 56', (goal) 75' (pen.); Makélélé (yellow card) 82'	Report	Totti 35'; Samuel (yellow card) 57'; Cafu (yellow card) 62'; Zebina (yellow card) 67'	Stadium: Santiago Bernabéu; Attendance: 63,000; Referee: Hellmut Krug (Germany)

6 November 2001 6	Roma (Italy)	1–1	(Belgium) Anderlecht	Rome, Italy
20:45 CET (UTC+01:00)	Delvecchio 52'	Report	Mornar 11'	Stadium: Stadio Olimpico; Attendance: 28,157; Referee: Éric Poulat (France)

==== Second group stage ====
Pos	Team	Pld	W	D	L	GF	GA	GD	Pts	Qualification	BAR	LIV	ROM	GAL
1	(Spain) Barcelona	6	2	3	1	7	7	0	9	Advance to knockout stage	—	0–0	1–1	2–2
2	(England) Liverpool	6	1	4	1	4	4	0	7	Advance to knockout stage	1–3	—	2–0	0–0
3	(Italy) Roma	6	1	4	1	6	5	+1	7		3–0	0–0	—	1–1
4	(Turkey) Galatasaray	6	0	5	1	5	6	−1	5		0–1	1–1	1–1	—

Source: RSSSF

27 November 2001 1	Galatasaray (Turkey)	1–1	(Italy) Roma	Istanbul, Turkey
20:45 CET (UTC+01:00)	Pérez 22'; Emre Aşık (yellow card) 45'; Ümit Karan (yellow card) 72'; Capone (yellow card) 86'; Hasan Şaş (yellow card) 90+4'	Report	Emerson 90+2'; Batistuta (yellow card) 90+5'	Stadium: Ali Sami Yen Stadium; Attendance: 15,750; Referee: Claude Colombo (France)

12 December 2001 2	Roma (Italy)	0–0	(England) Liverpool	Rome, Italy
20:45 CET (UTC+01:00)	Tommasi (yellow card) 78'	Report		Stadium: Stadio Olimpico; Attendance: 58,721; Referee: Dick Jol (Netherlands)

20 February 2002 3	Barcelona (Spain)	1–1	(Italy) Roma	Barcelona, Spain
20:45 CET (UTC+01:00)	Rivaldo (yellow card) 42'; Kluivert 82'	Report	Samuel (yellow card) 32'; Panucci 57', (yellow card) 86'	Stadium: Camp Nou; Attendance: 90,527; Referee: Gilles Veissière (France)

26 February 2002 4	Roma (Italy)	3–0	(Spain) Barcelona	Rome, Italy
20:45 CET (UTC+01:00)	Delvecchio (yellow card) 36'; Lima (yellow card) 37'; Totti (yellow card) 52'; Emerson 61'; Montella 74'; Tommasi 90+2'	Report	Christanval (yellow card) 43'	Stadium: Stadio Olimpico; Attendance: 75,000; Referee: Kim Milton Nielsen (Denmark)

13 March 2002 5	Roma (Italy)	1–1	(Turkey) Galatasaray	Rome, Italy
20:45 CET (UTC+01:00)	Montella (yellow card) 23'; Cafu 52', (yellow card) 54'; Aldair (yellow card) 90+2'	Report	Hasan Şaş (yellow card) 28'; Ümit Karan 45'; Pérez (yellow card) 65'	Stadium: Stadio Olimpico; Attendance: 58,630; Referee: Anders Frisk (Sweden)

19 March 2002 6	Liverpool (England)	2–0	(Italy) Roma	Liverpool, England
20:45 CET (UTC+01:00)	Litmanen 7' (pen.); Heskey 64'; Xavier (yellow card) 66'	Report	Tommasi (yellow card) 63'; Samuel (yellow card) 88'	Stadium: Anfield; Attendance: 41,794; Referee: Rune Pedersen (Norway)

== Statistics ==
=== Players statistics ===
No.	Pos	Nat	Player	Total		Serie A		Coppa Italia		Champions League	
No.	Pos	Nat	Player	Apps	Goals	Apps	Goals	Apps	Goals	Apps	Goals
1	GK	(Italy) ITA	Antonioli	42	-29	30	-20	2	-2	10	-7
2	DF	(Brazil) BRA	Cafu	38	2	24+3	0	1	0	10	2
15	DF	(France) FRA	Zebina	36	0	23+1	0	2	0	10	0
14	DF	(Italy) ITA	Panucci	39	4	29+2	1	4	2	4	1
19	DF	(Argentina) ARG	Samuel	44	5	30	5	2	0	12	0
32	DF	(France) FRA	Candela	42	2	30+1	2	1	0	10	0
17	MF	(Italy) ITA	Tommasi	45	4	24+9	2	3	1	8+1	1
11	MF	(Brazil) BRA	Emerson	41	7	27+1	5	0+2	0	11	2
5	MF	(Brazil) BRA	Lima	42	0	19+9	0	2+1	0	10+1	0
10	FW	(Italy) ITA	Totti	35	11	23+1	8	0	0	11	3
24	FW	(Italy) ITA	Delvecchio	36	3	23+4	2	2	0	4+3	1
80	GK	(Italy) ITA	Pelizzoli	8	-10	4+1	-4	1	-3	2	-3
20	FW	(Argentina) ARG	Batistuta	34	6	20+3	6	0	0	9+2	0
8	MF	(Brazil) BRA	Assuncao	35	6	15+7	6	4	0	3+6	0
9	FW	(Italy) ITA	Montella	25	14	15+4	13	0	0	3+3	1
6	DF	(Brazil) BRA	Aldair	23	0	14+2	0	1	0	4+2	0
3	DF	(Brazil) BRA	Zago	19	0	11+1	0	2	0	5	0
7	MF	(Italy) ITA	Fuser	18	2	4+8	2	3	0	0+3	0
18	FW	(Italy) ITA	Cassano	30	6	3+19	5	3	1	1+4	0
25	MF	(Uruguay) URU	Guigou	13	0	3+4	0	1	0	3+2	0
29	DF	(Italy) ITA	Siviglia	7	0	3+2	0	1	0	1	0
23	MF	(Federal Republic of Yugoslavia) YUG	Tomic	6	0	0+2	0	2+1	0	1	0
16	FW	(Argentina) ARG	Balbo	7	0	0+1	0	4	0	0+2	0
12	GK	(Italy) ITA	Zotti	0	0	0	0	0	0	0	0
22	GK	(Argentina) ARG	Cejas	2	-2	0	0	1+1	-2	0	0
4	DF	(Argentina) ARG	Cufre	3	0	0	0	1+2	0	0	0
30	DF	(Italy) ITA	Bovo	1	0	0	0	0+1	0	0	0
27	MF	(Italy) ITA	De Rossi	4	0	0	0	1+2	0	0+1	0
28	MF	(Italy) ITA	Aquilani	0	0	0	0	0	0	0	0
21	DF	(Ivory Coast) CIV	Lassissi								

- Source: Competitions

=== Goalscorers ===
Rank	No.	Pos	Nat	Name	Serie A	Supercoppa	Coppa Italia	UEFA CL	Total
1	9	FW	(Italy)	Vincenzo Montella	13	1	0	1	15
2	10	FW	(Italy)	Francesco Totti	8	1	0	3	12
3	11	MF	(Brazil)	Emerson	5	0	0	2	7
4	5	MF	(Brazil)	Marcos Assunção	6	0	0	0	6
4	18	FW	(Italy)	Antonio Cassano	5	0	1	0	6
4	20	FW	(Argentina)	Gabriel Batistuta	6	0	0	0	6
7	19	DF	(Argentina)	Walter Samuel	5	0	0	0	5
8	14	DF	(Italy)	Christian Panucci	1	0	2	1	4
8	17	MF	(Italy)	Damiano Tommasi	2	0	1	1	4
10	24	FW	(Italy)	Marco Delvecchio	2	0	0	1	3
10	32	DF	(France)	Vincent Candela	2	1	0	0	3
12	2	DF	(Brazil)	Cafu	0	0	0	2	2
12	7	MF	(Italy)	Diego Fuser	2	0	0	0	2
Own goal					1	0	0	1	2
Totals					58	3	4	12	77

Last updated: 5 May 2002

=== Clean sheets ===
Rank	No.	Pos	Nat	Name	Serie A	Supercoppa	Coppa Italia	UEFA CL	Total
1	1	GK	(Italy)	Francesco Antonioli	15	0	1	4	20
2	80	GK	(Italy)	Ivan Pelizzoli	1	1	0	0	2
Totals					16	1	1	4	22

Last updated: 5 May 2002
