= Vincent Candela =

French footballer (born 1973)

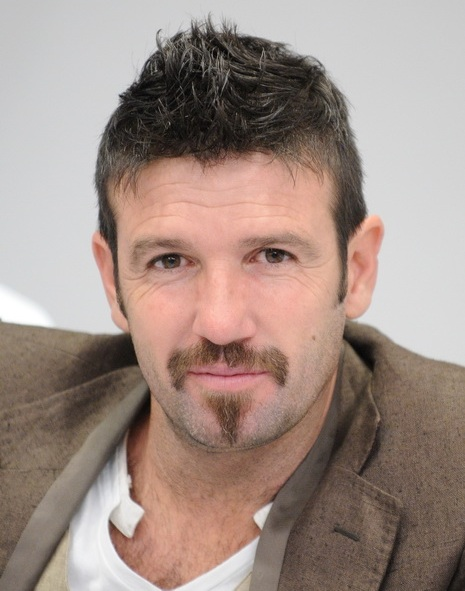
- Candela in 2011

Personal information
- Full name: Vincent Philippe Antoine Candela
- Date of birth: 24 October 1973 (age 53)
- Place of birth: Bédarieux, France
- Height: 1.80 m (5 ft 11 in)
- Positions: Left back; right back

Senior career*
Years	Team	Apps	(Gls)
1991–1995	Toulouse	57	(3)
1995–1997	Guingamp	48	(2)
1997–2005	Roma	210	(14)
2005	Bolton Wanderers	9	(0)
2005–2006	Udinese	26	(1)
2006–2007	Siena	14	(0)
2007	→ Messina (loan)	16	(0)
Total		380	(20)

International career
1996–2002	France	40	(2)
Medal record
Men's football
Representing France
FIFA World Cup
Winner	1998
UEFA European Championship
Winner	2000
- * Club domestic league appearances and goals

Vincent Philippe Antoine Candela (born 24 October 1973) is a French former professional footballer who played as a full-back He is best-known for his time playing for Italian club Roma. Candela earned 40 caps for the France national team and was part of the squads that won the 1998 FIFA World Cup and UEFA Euro 2000.

== Early life ==
Candela was born in Bédarieux, Hérault.

== Club career ==
At club level, Candela played football in France with Toulouse (1992–95) and Guingamp (1995–97), before moving to Italian side AS Roma (1997–2005). He won one scudetto with Roma, as well as the Supercoppa Italiana, in 2001, also helping the club to the 2003 Coppa Italia Final. He later joined English side Bolton Wanderers (2005), before returning to Italy to play for Udinese (2005–2006), and Siena (2006–2007), as well as spending a spell on loan with Messina (2007). On 28 January 2007 he played his last Serie A match for Messina against Ascoli.

== International career ==
For France, Candela was capped 40 times between 1996 and 2003, scoring two goals. His playing time was often limited by Bixente Lizarazu, but he did play in one match during France's 1998 FIFA World Cup triumph on home soil. During France's triumphant Euro 2000 campaign, Candela played two matches, both as a starter. He also played for France at the 1996 Summer Olympic Games, and at the 2002 FIFA World Cup.

== Style of play ==
Candela was a quick, offensive-minded, and technically skilled left wingback, who was effective at joining the attack as well as being capable in defence, due to his intelligence and tenacity. Although he preferred playing on the left flank, he was naturally right-footed, and was also capable of playing on the right, both as a full-back, and as a winger, and was an accurate crosser and set-piece taker.

== Career statistics ==
=== Club ===
Appearances and goals by club, season and competition
Club	Season	League			Cup (Note: Includes Coupe de France, Coupe de la Ligue, Coppa Italia, Supercoppa Italiana and FA Cup.)		Continental (Note: Includes UEFA Champions League, UEFA Cup and UEFA Intertoto Cup.)		Total	
Club	Season	Division	Apps	Goals	Apps	Goals	Apps	Goals	Apps	Goals
Toulouse	1992–93	Division 1	3	0	–		–		3	0
Toulouse	1993–94	Division 1	27	1	1	0	–		28	1
Toulouse	1994–95	Division 2	27	2	–		–		27	2
Toulouse	Total		57	3	1	0	0	0	58	3
Guingamp	1995–96	Division 1	27	1	4	0	–		31	1
Guingamp	1996–97	Division 1	21	1	2	0	3	0	26	1
Guingamp	Total		48	2	6	0	3	0	57	2
Roma	1996–97	Serie A	15	2	–		–		15	2
Roma	1997–98	Serie A	32	2	6	0	–		38	2
Roma	1998–99	Serie A	30	1	4	0	8	0	42	1
Roma	1999–2000	Serie A	26	3	4	1	8	0	38	4
Roma	2000–01	Serie A	33	3	2	0	5	0	40	3
Roma	2001–02	Serie A	31	2	2	1	10	0	43	3
Roma	2002–03	Serie A	23	1	8	0	10	0	41	1
Roma	2003–04	Serie A	12	0	4	0	4	0	20	0
Roma	2004–05	Serie A	8	0	1	0	3	0	12	0
Roma	Total		210	14	31	2	48	0	289	16
Bolton	2004–05	Premier League	9	0	2	0	–		11	0
Udinese	2005–06	Serie A	26	1	3	0	11	1	40	2
Siena	2006–07	Serie A	14	0	2	0	–		16	0
Messina (loan)	2006–07	Serie A	16	0	–		–		16	0
Career total			380	20	45	2	62	1	487	23

=== International goals ===
Scores and results list France's goal tally first, score column indicates score after each Candela goal.

List of international goals scored by Vincent Candela
No.	Date	Venue	Opponent	Score	Result	Competition
1	14 October 1998	Stade de France, Saint-Denis, France	Andorra	1–0	2–0	UEFA Euro 2000 qualifying
2	6 October 2001	Stade de France, Saint-Denis, France	Algeria	1–0	4–1	Friendly

== Honours ==
Guingamp

- UEFA Intertoto Cup: 1996

Roma

- Serie A: 2000–01
- Supercoppa Italiana: 2001

France

- FIFA World Cup: 1998
- UEFA European Championship: 2000

Individual

- AS Roma Hall of Fame: 2014

Orders

- Knight of the Legion of Honour: 1998
