= Abel Balbo =

Argentine footballer & manager (born 1966)

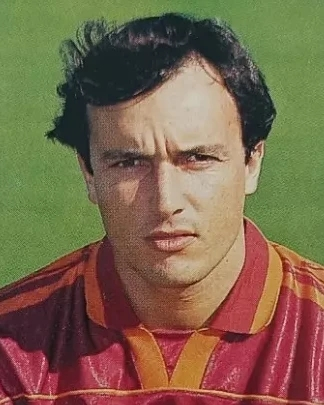
- Balbo with Roma in 1995

Personal information
- Full name: Abel Eduardo Balbo
- Date of birth: 1 June 1966 (age 60)
- Place of birth: Empalme, Argentina
- Height: 1.80 m (5 ft 11 in)
- Position: Striker

Youth career
- Newell's Old Boys

Senior career*
Years	Team	Apps	(Gls)
1987–1988	Newell's Old Boys	23	(9)
1988–1989	River Plate	38	(12)
1989–1993	Udinese	134	(66)
1993–1998	Roma	146	(78)
1998–1999	Parma	25	(4)
1999–2000	Fiorentina	19	(3)
2000–2002	Roma	3	(0)
2002	Boca Juniors	4	(0)
Total		392	(172)

International career
1989–1998	Argentina	37	(11)

Managerial career
- 2009: Treviso
- 2010–2011: Arezzo
- 2012: Arezzo
- 2022: Central Córdoba
- 2023: Estudiantes
- 2024: Central Córdoba
- * Club domestic league appearances and goals

Abel Eduardo Balbo (Spanish pronunciation: [aˈβel eˈðwaɾðo ˈβalβo]; born 1 June 1966) is an Argentine football manager and former player who played as a striker.

Balbo played for various clubs in Argentina and Italy during the course of his career. He was also an Argentine international.

== Club career ==
Balbo was born in Empalme Villa Constitución, Santa Fe.

At club level, Balbo played for Newell's Old Boys (1987–88), River Plate (1988–89), before moving to Italy and Udinese (1989–93), Roma (1993–98 and 2000–02), Parma (1998–99) and Fiorentina. He played four games for Boca Juniors before finally retiring. He scored a total of 138 goals in Serie A; his best seasons came in 1992–93 for Udinese and 1994–95 for Roma, with 22 goals in each of them.

In 2000, Roma paid Fiorentina 1.75 billion Italian lire to re-sign him and offered him a two-year contract with 1.7 billion annual salary before tax.

== International career ==
For Argentina, Balbo scored eleven goals in 37 caps, and played at the 1990, the 1994, the 1998 FIFA World Cups, the 1989 and 1995 Copa América. In the 1995 tournament in Uruguay, Balbo partnered Gabriel Batistuta in attack, and scored a goal against Brazil's Claudio Taffarel in an infamous quarter-final game that Argentina eventually lost in a penalty shootout after Brazilian striker Tulio Costa scored the Brazilian equalizer with ten minutes to go – after clearly controlling the ball with his arm.

== Post-retirement and coaching ==
After his retirement, Balbo eventually became a musician, performing songs in Italian and Spanish. He took his UEFA Pro coaching badges in 2007, and currently works as a football commentator for RAI Radio1.

In February 2009, he took his first head coaching job, succeeding to Luca Gotti as manager of bottom-table Serie B club Treviso. He resigned only a few rounds later, on 18 March, after having achieved only one point in four games, citing lack of professionalism and organizational issues as the main reasons for his choice to step down as Treviso manager.

In November 2010, he was appointed as new technical area coordinator and assistant coach of Serie D club Atletico Arezzo until the end of the season.

In the 2012–23 season, he coached the Serie D club Arezzo from the start of the season until 30 October 2012, when he left by mutual consent with the club. He subsequently worked as football commentator for Italian public broadcasting group RAI.

In June 2022, after almost ten years without a coaching job, Balbo moved back to Argentina to accept the managerial position at Argentine Primera División club Central Córdoba. On 20 October, after guiding his club to safety in the 2022 Argentine Primera División, Central Córdoba announced the departure of Balbo by the end of the season.

On 22 October 2022, Balbo took over fellow top-tier side Estudiantes. He left the following 4 March after only seven matches, and agreed to return to Central Córdoba on 22 December 2023.

== Style of play ==
Described as "an authentic centre-forward," by Il Corriere dello Sport in 2019, Balbo was a physically strong forward, with good feet and a powerful shot, who was renowned for his composure in front of goal and his efficient playing style. He was mainly known for his eye for goal and his movement, in particular inside the penalty area, which also made him a threat on counter–attacks; he also excelled in the air. In addition to his playing ability, he was also known to be a correct player.

== Personal life ==
Abel Balbo is married to fellow Argentine Lucila de Balbo. He is a practising Roman Catholic.

== Career statistics ==
=== Club ===
Appearances and goals by club, season and competition
Club	Season	League			National cup (Note: Includes Coppa Italia)		Continental		Other		Total	
Club	Season	Division	Apps	Goals	Apps	Goals	Apps	Goals	Apps	Goals	Apps	Goals
Newell's Old Boys	1986–87	Primera División	0	0	—		—		—		0	0
Newell's Old Boys	1987–88	Primera División	23	9	—		—		—		23	9
Newell's Old Boys	Total		23	9	—		—		—		23	9
River Plate	1988–89	Primera División	38	12	—		—		—		38	12
Udinese	1989–90	Serie A	28	11	1	0	—		—		29	11
Udinese	1990–91	Serie B	37	23	3	2	—		—		40	25
Udinese	1991–92	Serie B	37	11	4	1	—		—		41	12
Udinese	1992–93	Serie A	32	21	1	0	—		1 (Note: Appearance in Serie B Relegation tie-breaker)	1	34	22
Udinese	Total		134	66	9	3	—		1	1	144	70
Roma	1993–94	Serie A	30	12	2	1	—		—		32	13
Roma	1994–95	Serie A	32	22	4	0	—		—		36	22
Roma	1995–96	Serie A	26	13	1	0	7 (Note: Appearances in UEFA Cup)	4	—		34	17
Roma	1996–97	Serie A	30	17	—		4	2	—		34	19
Roma	1997–98	Serie A	28	14	3	2	—		—		31	16
Roma	Total		146	78	10	3	11	6	—		167	87
Parma	1998–99	Serie A	25	4	8	4	11	4	—		44	12
Fiorentina	1999–2000	Serie A	19	3	2	0	10 (Note: Appearances in UEFA Champions League)	4	—		31	7
Roma	2000–01	Serie A	2	0	2	0	3	0	—		7	0
Roma	2001–02	Serie A	1	0	4	0	2	0	1 (Note: Appearance in Supercoppa Italiana)	0	8	0
Roma	Total		3	0	6	0	5	0	1	0	15	0
Boca Juniors	2002–03	Primera División	4	0	—		—		—		4	0
Career total			392	172	35	10	37	14	2	1	466	197

=== International ===
Argentina
Year	Apps	Goals
1989	5	0
1990	5	1
1991	–	–
1992	–	–
1993	3	2
1994	9	3
1995	9	4
1996	4	1
1997	–	–
1998	2	0
Total	37	11

== Honours ==
=== Club ===
Newell's Old Boys

- Argentine Primera División: 1987–88

Parma

- Coppa Italia: 1998–99
- UEFA Cup: 1998–99

Roma

- Serie A: 2000–01
- Supercoppa Italiana: 2001

=== International ===
Argentina

- FIFA World Cup runner-up: 1990
- Copa América third place: 1989

=== Individual ===
- Serie B Top-Scorer: 1990–91 (22 goals, with Udinese)

Sporting positions
Preceded by Amedeo Carboni	Roma captain 1997–1998	Succeeded by Francesco Totti
