= Marco Delvecchio =

Italian footballer

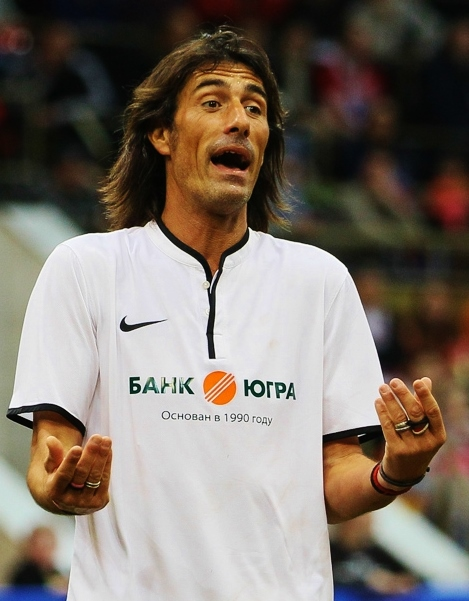
- Delvecchio in 2015

Personal information
- Full name: Marco Delvecchio
- Date of birth: 7 April 1973 (age 53)
- Place of birth: Milan, Italy
- Height: 1.86 m (6 ft 1 in)
- Position: Forward

Youth career
- Inter Milan

Senior career*
Years	Team	Apps	(Gls)
1991–1995	Inter Milan	37	(5)
1992–1993	→ Venezia (loan)	20	(3)
1993–1994	→ Udinese (loan)	7	(0)
1995–2005	Roma	231	(62)
2005	Brescia	5	(0)
2005–2006	Parma	8	(1)
2006–2007	Ascoli	10	(2)
2008–2009	Pescatori Ostia	35	(34)
Total		353	(107)

International career
1992–1996	Italy U21	26	(7)
1998–2004	Italy	22	(4)
Medal record
Men's football
Representing Italy
UEFA European Under-21 Championship
Winner	1994 France
Winner	1996 Spain
UEFA European Championship
Runner-up	2000 Belgium–Netherlands
- * Club domestic league appearances and goals

Marco Delvecchio Cavaliere OMRI (Italian pronunciation: [ˈmarko delˈvɛkkjo]; born 7 April 1973) is an Italian former professional footballer who played as a forward. Although he played for several Italian clubs throughout his career, he spent most of it at Roma, where he is still remembered by the club's fans for his ease in scoring against rivals Lazio in the Derby della Capitale, and for the contributions he made to the club's league title victory in 2001. At international level, he represented Italy on 22 occasions between 1998 and 2004, scoring 4 goals, taking part at UEFA Euro 2000, reaching the final of the tournament, in which he scored, and at the 2002 FIFA World Cup.

Delvecchio collaborates with a Rome-based private radio station as a football pundit.

== Club career ==
Delvecchio was born in Milan, Italy, where he started his professional career with Inter (1992 and 1994–95). He went on to represent Venezia (1992–93) and Udinese (1993–94) before joining Roma in 1995. His career reached a high when he transferred to Roma, becoming a key player at the club. He notably won the Scudetto with Roma in 2001, followed by the 2001 Supercoppa Italiana, under manager Fabio Capello, alongside forwards Francesco Totti, Gabriel Batistuta and Vincenzo Montella. He also reached the Coppa Italia Final with Roma during the 2002–03 season. He subsequently played one season for Brescia in 2004–05, and was then bought by Parma in 2005. In 2006, Parma released him and he went on to join Ascoli on a free transfer.

On 10 May 2007, Delvecchio and Ascoli mutually agreed to terminate his contract following a combination of a knee injury and Ascoli's relegation to Serie B, the latter following a 1–0 loss to Torino three days earlier. He scored twice in ten appearances for the club.

After one season of inactivity, Delvecchio decided to abandon professional football altogether and accept an offer from Eccellenza Lazio side Pescatori Ostia, where he scored 34 goals throughout the season.

== International career ==
Delvecchio was a member of the Italy under-21 teams that won the UEFA European Under-21 Championship in 1994 and 1996; in total, he scored 6 goals for the under-21 side in 24 appearances between 1992 and 1996. He also represented Italy at the 1996 Olympics in Atlanta, making three appearances and scoring once.

He made his international debut for the Italy senior side under manager Dino Zoff on 16 December 1998, in a friendly match in Rome against the FIFA World-Stars, commemorating the first century since the founding of the Italian Football Federation. He was subsequently called up by Zoff for the 22-man Italian squad that took part at Euro 2000, making three appearances throughout the tournament. His first international goal came against France in the Euro 2000 final, although Italy later conceded an equaliser in the final minute of stoppage time, and were defeated in extra-time from a golden goal. Delvecchio travelled to Korea with the 23-man Italian 2002 World Cup squad, but did not play during the tournament under manager Giovanni Trapattoni. After the World Cup, he scored a goal in a 2–0 friendly win over Northern Ireland, and on 18 February 2004, he made his final appearance for Italy against the Czech Republic, missing out on Trapattoni's Euro 2004 squad. He was not selected for the country's FIFA World Cup-winning squad in 2006. Delvecchio scored 3 goals in 14 starts for the Italy senior team, scoring 4 goals in 22 total appearances for Italy between 1998 and 2006.

== Style of play ==
Delvecchio was a versatile, powerful, determined, and hard-working forward, who was capable of playing anywhere along the front line, as well as in midfield, as either a winger or as an attacking midfielder, although he was primarily utilised as a central striker or as a supporting forward. Due to his height and strength, his main attributes were his aerial ability, as well as his finishing, and his positioning skills. Despite his large, slender frame, he was also a good passer and dribbler, which enabled him to link-up with other players, create chances, and provide teammates with assists.

== Personal life and media ==
Delvecchio was a contestant on the Italian version of Dancing with the Stars, Ballando con le Stelle 2012, where he placed second alongside professional dancer Sara Di Vaira, with whom he later began a relationship.

== Career statistics ==
=== Club ===
Appearances and goals by club, season and competition
Club	Season	League			Coppa Italia		Europe		Other		Total	
Club	Season	Division	Apps	Goals	Apps	Goals	Apps	Goals	Apps	Goals	Apps	Goals
Inter Milan	1991–92	Serie A	4	0	1	0	0	0	—		5	0
Inter Milan	1994–95	Serie A	29	4	4	0	1 (Note: Appearance(s) in UEFA Cup)	0	—		34	4
Inter Milan	1995–96	Serie A	4	1	0	0	1	0	—		5	1
Inter Milan	Total		37	5	5	0	2	0	—		44	5
Venezia (loan)	1992–93	Serie B	20	3	2	0	—		—		22	3
Udinese (loan)	1993–94	Serie A	7	0	2	0	—		—		9	0
Roma	1995–96	Serie A	24	10	0	0	0	0	—		24	10
Roma	1996–97	Serie A	27	4	1	0	2	0	—		30	4
Roma	1997–98	Serie A	27	7	5	1	—		—		32	8
Roma	1998–99	Serie A	31	18	3	1	8	4	—		42	23
Roma	1999–2000	Serie A	28	11	3	0	6	1	—		37	12
Roma	2000–01	Serie A	31	3	2	0	8	5	—		41	8
Roma	2001–02	Serie A	27	2	2	0	7 (Note: Appearances in UEFA Champions League)	1	1 (Note: Appearance in Supercoppa Italiana)	0	37	3
Roma	2002–03	Serie A	16	4	6	4	6	1	—		28	9
Roma	2003–04	Serie A	16	3	4	2	4	1	—		24	6
Roma	2004–05	Serie A	4	0	0	0	1	0	—		5	0
Roma	Total		231	62	26	8	42	13	1	0	300	83
Brescia	2004–05	Serie A	5	0	0	0	—		—		5	0
Parma	2005–06	Serie A	8	1	1	0	—		—		9	1
Ascoli	2006–07	Serie A	10	2	0	0	—		—		10	2
Career total			318	73	36	8	44	13	1	0	399	94

=== International ===
Appearances and goals by national team and year
National team	Year	Apps	Goals
Italy	1998	1	0
Italy	1999	1	0
Italy	2000	9	2
Italy	2001	3	1
Italy	2002	2	0
Italy	2003	5	1
Italy	2004	1	0
Total		22	4

Scores and results list Italy's goal tally first, score column indicates score after each Delvecchio goal.

List of international goals scored by Marco Delvecchio
No.	Date	Venue	Opponent	Score	Result	Competition
1	2 July 2000	De Kuip, Rotterdam, Netherlands	France	1–0	1–2	UEFA Euro 2000
2	7 October 2000	San Siro, Milan, Italy	Romania	2–0	3–0	2002 FIFA World Cup qualification
3	2 June 2001	Boris Paichadze National Stadium, Tbilisi, Georgia	Georgia	1–0	2–1	2002 FIFA World Cup qualification
4	3 June 2003	Stadio Nuovo Romagnoli, Campobasso, Italy	Northern Ireland	2–0	2–0	Friendly

== Honours ==
Roma

- Serie A: 2000–01
- Supercoppa Italiana: 2001

Italy U21

- UEFA European Under-21 Championship: 1994, 1996

Italy

- UEFA European Championship runner-up: 2000

Orders

5th Class / Knight: Cavaliere Ordine al Merito della Repubblica Italiana: 2000
