= Gabriele Grossi =

Italian footballer

Personal information
- Date of birth: February 11, 1972 (age 54)
- Place of birth: Rome, Italy
- Height: 1.77 m (5 ft 9 1/2 in)
- Position: Defender

Senior career*
Years	Team	Apps	(Gls)
1991–1992	Roma	0	(0)
1992–1993	Lecce	32	(1)
1993	Roma	4	(0)
1994	Bari	15	(0)
1994–1995	Napoli	9	(0)
1995–1996	Vicenza	16	(0)
1996	Roma	0	(0)
1996–1997	Reggiana	20	(1)
1997–1999	Perugia	20	(1)
1999–2000	Savoia	16	(0)
2000–2004	L'Aquila	50	(3)
2007–2008	Vigili Urbani Roma	0	(0)

International career
1993	Italy U-21	1	(0)
- * Club domestic league appearances and goals as of 15 July 2011

Gabriele Grossi (born February 11, 1972, in Rome) is a retired Italian professional football player.

He played 6 seasons (41 starts and 1 goal) in the Serie A. He has had 10 yellow cards and 1 red cards in his career. He has played for 5 clubs. In his career, he has had 3,415 minutes
