= Gianluca Cherubini =

Italian footballer (1974–2026)

Personal information
- Date of birth: 28 February 1974
- Place of birth: Rome, Italy
- Date of death: 1 April 2026 (aged 52)
- Height: 1.84 m (6 ft 0 in)
- Position: Defender

Senior career*
Years	Team	Apps	(Gls)
1992–1995	Reggiana	45	(0)
1995–1996	Roma	5	(0)
1996–2002	Reggiana	101	(4)
2000	→ Vicenza (loan)	1	(0)
2002–2004	Chieti	57	(2)
2004–2005	Torres	28	(1)
2005–2006	Giulianova	30	(0)
2008–2009	Chieti		

Managerial career
- 2007–2009: Stella Polare (assistant)
- * Club domestic league appearances and goals

Gianluca Cherubini (28 February 1974 – 1 April 2026) was an Italian professional footballer who played as a defender.

Cherubini played for four seasons in the Serie A for A.C. Reggiana 1919 and A.S. Roma.

In 2006, he suffered a cerebral aneurysm during a game for Giulianova against Novara, which caused fears for his life. He recovered and later played for another season.

Cherubini died on 1 April 2026, at the age of 52.
