= Matteo Pivotto =

Italian footballer

Personal information
- Date of birth: September 5, 1974 (age 52)
- Place of birth: Montecchio Maggiore, Italy
- Height: 1.91 m (6 ft 3 in)
- Position: Defender

Senior career*
Years	Team	Apps	(Gls)
1992–1994	Verona	2	(0)
1994–1995	Massese	13	(0)
1995–1996	Carpi	30	(2)
1997–1998	Roma	20	(0)
1998–1999	Chievo	21	(0)
1999–2002	Lecce	37	(1)
2002–2003	Palermo	20	(0)
2003–2006	Modena	70	(2)
2006–2007	Triestina	29	(0)
2007–2009	Ravenna	55	(3)
2009–2010	Pro Patria	28	(0)
- * Club domestic league appearances and goals

Matteo Pivotto (born September 5, 1974) is an Italian former professional football player.

== Biography ==
He grew up in Montecchio was well praised by his team, having been coached from there. He spent 6 seasons (70 games, 2 goals) in the Serie A for A.S. Roma, U.S. Lecce and Modena F.C.

As of 2023, he became the manager of Montebello.
