= Massimiliano Cappioli =

Italian footballer

Personal information
- Date of birth: 17 January 1968 (age 58)
- Place of birth: Rome, Italy
- Height: 1.83 m (6 ft 0 in)
- Position: Midfielder

Youth career
- Pescatori Ostia
- 1986–1988: Roma

Senior career*
Years	Team	Apps	(Gls)
1988–1993	Cagliari	144	(25)
1993–1996	Roma	90	(15)
1996–1998	Udinese	24	(3)
1998	Atalanta	11	(0)
1998–1999	Bologna	22	(1)
1999–2000	Perugia	13	(2)
2000–2002	Palermo	57	(16)
2003	Taranto	9	(2)
2008–2009	Pescatori Ostia		

International career
1994	Italy	1	(0)

Managerial career
- 2008–2009: Pescatori Ostia
- * Club domestic league appearances and goals

Massimiliano Cappioli (Italian pronunciation: [massimiˈljaːno kapˈpjɔːli]; born 17 January 1968) is a former Italian professional footballer who played as a midfielder.

== Career ==
After having spent his early years in the AS Roma youth system, he moved to Cagliari in 1988 and played five seasons with the Sardinian side. The Serie C1 club, managed by Claudio Ranieri, obtained two consecutive promotions in 1989 and 1990, and Cappioli played three Serie A seasons with the rossoblu before to return at AS Roma in 1993. In 1994, he made his one and only appearance for the Italy national team, a 0–1 home loss in Naples to France. He left Roma in December 1996 for Udinese and successively moved to several other Serie A clubs in the next years.

In 2000, he signed for Palermo of Serie C1, captaining the side to win the league and being its topscorer with 13 goals, also thanks to the fact he was the main penalty kicker. After another season with Palermo, he left the rosanero in 2002. After several months of inactivity, he signed in February 2003 for Taranto, but failed to impress, and retired at the end of the season.

In September 2008 he made a comeback into football, returning as a player/manager to his childhood team Pescatori Ostia in the Eccellenza league, together with former professional players Marco Delvecchio and Antonio Criniti.

== Honours ==
- UEFA Intertoto Cup: 1998
