= Giorgio Sterchele =

Italian footballer

Personal information
- Date of birth: 8 January 1970 (age 56)
- Place of birth: Schio, Italy
- Height: 1.86 m (6 ft 1 in)
- Position: Goalkeeper

Youth career
- 1988–1990: Vicenza

Senior career*
Years	Team	Apps	(Gls)
1990–1995	Vicenza	140	(0)
1995–2000	Roma	17	(0)
1997	→ Cagliari (loan)	17	(0)
1997–1998	→ Bologna (loan)	32	(0)
1999	→ Ternana (loan)	18	(0)
2000	→ Perugia (loan)	0	(0)
2000–2007	Vicenza	145	(0)
Total		369	(0)

Managerial career
- 2008–2009: Sarcedo (youth gk coach)
- 2009: Sarcedo
- 2009: Bellaria Igea Marina (gk coach)
- 2011–2012: Padova (gk coach)
- 2013–2015: Unione Venezia (gk coach)
- 2017–2018: Vicenza (gk coach)
- 2018: Vicenza (assistant coach)
- 2018–2019: Este (gk coach)
- 2020: Schio (assistant coach)
- * Club domestic league appearances and goals

Giorgio Sterchele (born 8 January 1970) is an Italian former professional footballer who played as a goalkeeper.

== Playing career ==
Sterchele was born in Schio. In his early years, he played with Vicenza Calcio, the team of his province. He played regularly for the club from 1991 and won Serie A promotion with the team in 1995. He achieved two promotions, and in 1995, he moved on to A.S. Roma. He also played for Cagliari (January 1997), Bologna, Ternana (January 1999) and Perugia Calcio (January 2000), before returning to Vicenza in 2000.

With 285 appearances for Vicenza, he has played more matches than any other goalkeeper in Vicenza's history. Only three players in the history of Vicenza have played in more games than Sterchele.

== Coaching career ==
In July 2008, Sterchele started collaborating with a newly established soccer school in the province of Vicenza (Zanè - Sarcedo) with the task of taking care of the technical aspects of the young goalkeepers. Halfway through the season he was promoted to first-team coach and confirmed for the following season, despite the team's relegation. However, in November 2009 he was forced to leave the position due to health problems with a leg.

Ahead of the 2009–10 season, while he was still coaching Sarcedo, Lamberto Zauli, his former teammate from Vicenza, hired Sterchele as his goalkeeper coach at Bellaria Igea Marina. He only stayed in this position for two months. On 18 June 2011, instead, he became the new goalkeeper coach of Alessandro Dal Canto's Padova. Dal Canto and his staff, including Sterchele, left Padova at the end of the season.

On 15 July 2013, he became the new goalkeeping coach of Unione Venezia. He was then unemployed until the 2017–18 season, where he functioned as goalkeeper coach of Vicenza's U19 team. On 10 May 2018, Sterchele was promoted to first team coach. He left at the end of the month.

Ahead of the 2018–19 season, he was hired as the goalkeeper coach of AC Este. He left at the end of the season. Ahead of the 2020–21 season, Sterchele was hired by Schio.
