= Daniel Fonseca =

Uruguayan footballer (born 1969)

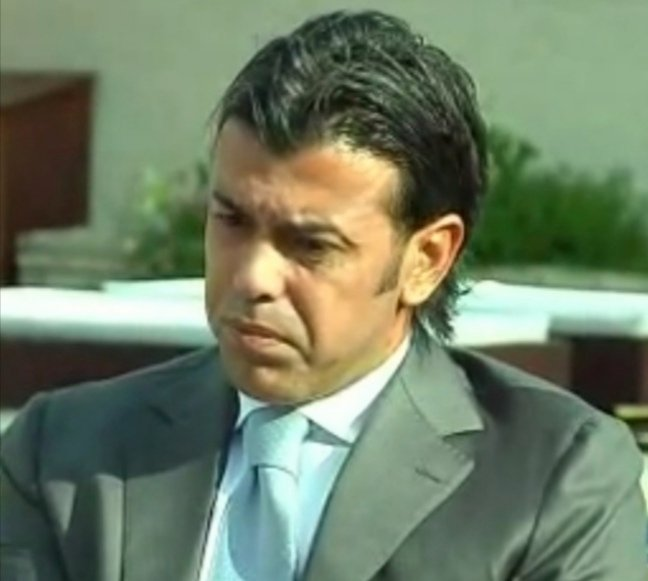
- Fonseca in 2013

Personal information
- Full name: Daniel Fonseca Garis
- Date of birth: 13 September 1969 (age 57)
- Place of birth: Montevideo, Uruguay
- Height: 1.83 m (6 ft 0 in)
- Position: Forward

Senior career*
| Years | Team | Apps | (Gls) |
| 1988–1990 | Nacional | 14 | (3) |
| 1990–1992 | Cagliari | 50 | (17) |
| 1992–1994 | Napoli | 58 | (31) |
| 1994–1997 | Roma | 65 | (20) |
| 1997–2001 | Juventus | 40 | (10) |
| 2001–2002 | River Plate | 0 | (0) |
| 2002 | Nacional | 5 | (2) |
| 2002–2003 | Como | 2 | (0) |
| Total | | 234 | (83) |

International career
| 1990–1997 | Uruguay | 31 | (10) |
Medal record
Representing Uruguay
Copa América
| Winner | 1995 Uruguay |
- * Club domestic league appearances and goals

Daniel Fonseca Garis (born 13 September 1969) is a Uruguayan former footballer and a FIFA-licensed football agent.

A former forward, throughout his playing career, he played for Uruguayan side Nacional, as well as Italian clubs Cagliari, Napoli, Roma, Juventus, and Como, and Argentine side River Plate, winning titles with both Nacional and Juventus. In 11 seasons in the Serie A, Fonseca played 213 matches and scored 78 goals.

At international level, he represented Uruguay on 30 occasions between 1990 and 1997, scoring 11 goals, and also took part at the 1990 FIFA World Cup and the 1995 Copa América, winning the latter tournament.

== Club career ==
Fonseca, nicknamed el castor ("the beaver"), started his football career at Nacional, his local team in Uruguay, in 1988. In his first two seasons (1988–1990) with Nacional, he made 14 appearances and scored three goals.

In 1990, he moved to Cagliari, scoring 17 goals in 50 appearances, playing mostly on the left rather than in his more habitual central position.

In 1992 Napoli signed him and Fonseca managed a more impressive strike rate, scoring 31 goals in two seasons in Naples, including 5 goals in a 5–1 win against Valencia in the first knock-out round of the UEFA Cup on 16 September 1992. His form and performances drew attention from Roma, who promptly signed him in 1994.

According to interviews, Fonseca sometimes wore lighter-coloured Uruguay national team socks during Napoli matches, citing them as a personal good-luck charm.

However, his three seasons (from 1994 to 1997) were far from successful. Fonseca usually played as a second striker, supporting the Argentine centre forward Abel Balbo, but, because of the many injuries he suffered, he played discontinuously.

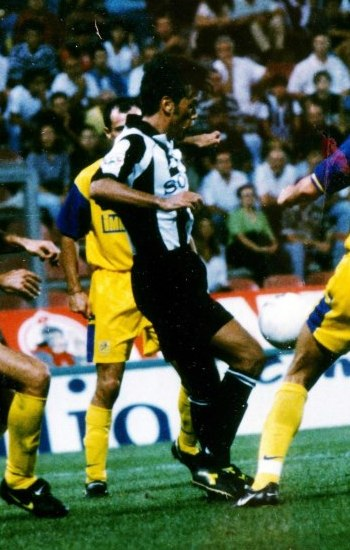
Fonseca playing for Juventus in 1997

Juventus signed Fonseca in 1997, but he was once again played out of position on the left wing, as he had been at Cagliari and Roma. His goalscoring record in Serie A was very good considering he was not always a first choice player with Roma and Juventus. Fonseca was always regarded as a "super sub", and scored several important goals coming off the bench. During his time with the Turin club, he won one Serie A title, a Champions League runner-up medal and the Supercoppa Italiana.

Injuries sidelined him for nearly the entire 1999–2000 season, with only two brief cup appearances, before his transfer to River Plate in 2000. There, he infamously played only during the club's 2000 pre-season. His only match was a pre-season encounter against archrivals Boca Juniors, and Fonseca helped his club to earn a win by scoring the final penalty in the shootout. A few days later, Fonseca would resign from his contract and join Como in 2001. He retired in 2003 after the coach told him that he was no longer a part of the first team's plans.

== International career ==
Fonseca represented the Uruguay national team on 30 occasions between 1990 and 1997, scoring 11 goals. He was a member of the team that took part at the 1990 FIFA World Cup, scoring in injury time in the final group game against South Korea, and was also in the squad that won the 1995 Copa América.

== Style of play ==
Fonseca combined pace and work-rate with dribbling ability, vision, and a powerful shot. Playing as a striker he both scored and created goal opportunities for teammates. A versatile and well-rounded attacker, Fonseca was also effective in the air, and was capable of playing in several offensive positions. His pace, technique, defensive work-rate, and passing ability meant he could play on the left wing, as well as in a central role, or even in a more creative role as a second striker alongside or behind another striker. He was also an accurate penalty kick and set-piece taker. Despite his ability, however, he was also injury prone.

== After football ==
Fonseca currently works as a football agent, and has represented several of his compatriots, including Martín Cáceres, Fernando Muslera, and Luis Suárez.

== Personal life ==
Daniel is the father of footballers Nicolás Fonseca and Matías Fonseca.

In April 2016, he was named in the Panama Papers.

== Career statistics ==
Appearances and goals by national team and year
| National team | Year | Apps | Goals |
|---|---|---|---|
| Uruguay | 1990 | 6 | 1 |
| Uruguay | 1993 | 9 | 4 |
| Uruguay | 1995 | 8 | 5 |
| Uruguay | 1996 | 3 | 0 |
| Uruguay | 1997 | 4 | 0 |
| Total | | 30 | 10 |

Scores and results list Uruguay's goal tally first, score column indicates score after each Fonseca goal.

List of international goals scored by Daniel Fonseca
| No. | Date | Venue | Opponent | Score | Result | Competition | Ref. |
|---|---|---|---|---|---|---|---|
| 1 | 21 June 1990 | Stadio Friuli, Udine, Italy | South Korea | 1–0 | 1–0 | 1990 FIFA World Cup | |
| 2 | 17 July 1993 | Estadio Centenario, Montevideo, Uruguay | Peru | 1–0 | 3–0 | Friendly | |
| 3 | 17 July 1993 | Estadio Centenario, Montevideo, Uruguay | Peru | 3–0 | 3–0 | Friendly | |
| 4 | 15 August 1993 | Estadio Centenario, Montevideo, Uruguay | Brazil | 1–1 | 1–1 | 1994 FIFA World Cup qualification | |
| 5 | 12 September 1993 | Estadio Centenario, Montevideo, Uruguay | Bolivia | 2–1 | 2–1 | 1994 FIFA World Cup qualification | |
| 6 | 18 January 1995 | Estadio Riazor, A Coruña, Spain | Spain | 1–1 | 2–2 | Friendly | |
| 7 | 25 June 1995 | Estadio Parque Artigas, Paysandú, Uruguay | New Zealand | 1–0 | 7–0 | Friendly | |
| 8 | 25 June 1995 | Estadio Parque Artigas, Paysandú, Uruguay | New Zealand | 2–0 | 7–0 | Friendly | |
| 9 | 5 July 1995 | Estadio Centenario, Montevideo, Uruguay | Venezuela | 1–0 | 4–1 | 1995 Copa América | |
| 10 | 16 July 1995 | Estadio Centenario, Montevideo, Uruguay | Bolivia | 2–0 | 2–1 | 1995 Copa América | |

== Honours ==
Nacional

- Recopa Sudamericana: 1989
- Copa Interamericana: 1989
- Primera División Uruguaya: 2002

Juventus

- Serie A: 1997–98
- Supercoppa Italiana: 1997 Runner-up: 1998
- UEFA Champions League Runner-up: 1997–98
- UEFA Intertoto Cup: 1999

International
Uruguay

- Copa América: 1995
