= Giampaolo Di Magno =

Italian footballer, coach, and manager

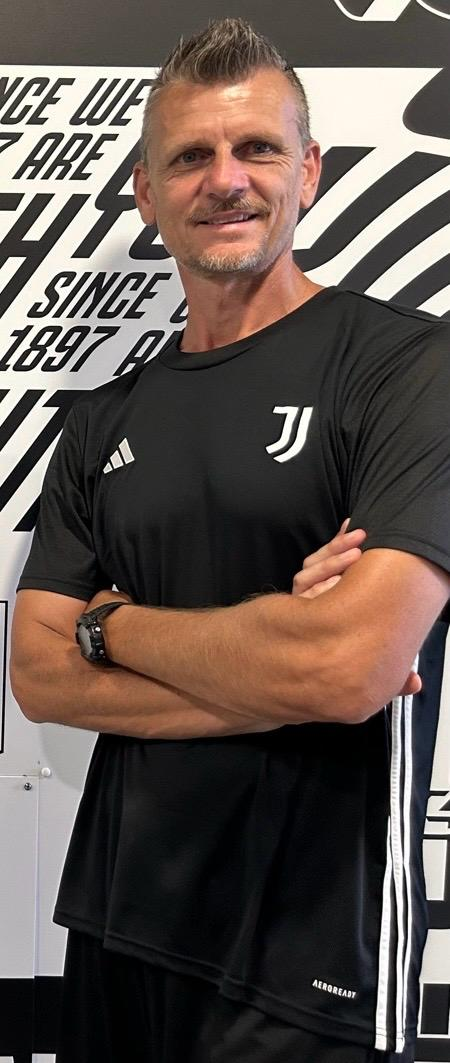
- Giampaolo Di Magno in 2025

Personal information
- Date of birth: April 1, 1974 (age 52)
- Place of birth: Nettuno, Italy
- Height: 1.94 m (6 ft 4 1/2 in)
- Position: Goalkeeper

Senior career*
Years	Team	Apps	(Gls)
1995–1997	Roma	1	(0)
1997–1998	→ Carpi (loan)	29	(0)
1998	Espanyol	1	(0)
1999	Foggia	1	(0)
1999–2000	Carpi	24	(0)
2000–2001	Maceratese	33	(0)
2001–2002	Castelnuovo Garfagnana	10	(0)
2002–2003	Poggese	4	(0)
2003–2004	Fondi	15	(0)
2005-2006	Latina	20	
2007	Duque de Caxias	4	(0)
2007–2008	Gaeta	22	(0)
2008	AS Ostia Mare Lido Calcio		
2008–2009	Latina		

International career
1993	Italy Under 19	1	(0)

Managerial career
- 2008–2011: Latina (goalkeepers)
- 2011–2012: Latina (assistant)
- 2013–2014: Fluminense (scout)
- 2014–2015: São José dos Pinhais (goalkeepers)
- 2015–2016: Racing Roma (goalkeepers)
- 2016–2018: Racing Fondi (goalkeepers)
- 2018: San Luis de Quillota (goalkeepers)
- 2018–2019: Unión La Calera (goalkeepers)
- 2019–2025: Juventus (youth goalkeepers)
- 2025–: Juventus FC Youth Sector Juventus International Academy
- * Club domestic league appearances and goals

Giampaolo Di Magno (born April 1, 1974 in Nettuno) is an Italian football coach and manager, and former professional player. He owns the title no. 49422 since 2011, and the Uefa B licence since 2001, as well as "Uefa Goalkeeper B" and "Goalkeeper Pro Coverciano (Italian FA)".

Di Magno made one Serie A appearance for AS Roma.

He is the current youth goalkeepers' technical director at Italian Serie A club Juventus, since July 1, 2019.

== Honours ==
- Coppa Italia Primavera winner: 1996-97
