= Francesco Statuto =

Italian footballer (born 1971)

Personal information
- Date of birth: 13 July 1971 (age 55)
- Place of birth: Rome, Italy
- Height: 1.74 m (5 ft 9 in)
- Position: Midfielder

Senior career*
Years	Team	Apps	(Gls)
1989–1990	Roma	0	(0)
1990–1992	Casertana	38	(0)
1992–1993	Cosenza	29	(2)
1993–1994	Udinese	31	(1)
1994–1997	Roma	74	(3)
1997–1998	Udinese	19	(1)
1998	Roma	0	(0)
1999–2002	Piacenza	73	(3)
2002–2003	Torino	0	(0)
2003–2004	Padova	1	(0)

International career
1995	Italy	3	(0)

Managerial career
- 2012: Grosseto
- 2022–2023: Roma City
- * Club domestic league appearances and goals

Francesco Statuto (Italian pronunciation: [franˈtʃesko staˈtuːto]; born 13 July 1971) is an Italian professional football coach and a former player, being among the top midfielders for Roma during the 1990s.

== Club career ==
Statuto played with Roma over three periods, beginning from the 1989-90 season, in which he did not play a single match for the giallorossi. He then went on to join lower-division club Casertana before moving on to Cosenza in 1992 and Serie A hopefuls Udinese in 1993. With Udinese relegated in the summer of 1994, Francesco joined Roma for the new season. The club ended in a good fifth place, thus qualifying for next year's UEFA Cup. After another fifth-place finish, the club disappointingly finished 12th in the 1996–97 season, and heads started to roll. Spending another half year in Rome, Statuto moved back to former club Udinese for the remainder of the 1997–98 season - finishing third with the Friuli-outfit - one spot ahead of Roma.

For the 1998–99 season, Statuto, who had played extraordinarily well for Udinese, was back with the giallorossi, leading the club to another fifth-place finish in the Serie A, playing alongside a young Francesco Totti. A memorable season for Statuto, including a short loan spell at Piacenza, the club he eventually joined fully in the summer of 1999.

He played three seasons for Piacenza, which saw out his career. The three years offered a relegation to the Serie B and a promotion back to the Serie A with the red and white outfit.

== International career ==
Statuto earned three caps for the Italy national team in 1995.

== Coaching career ==
In 2012 Statuto served briefly as the caretaker of Grosseto in Serie B for the two last games of the team.

In July 2022, Statuto returned to management as the new head coach of newly established Serie D club Roma City. He departed by the end of the season as he failed to save the team from relegation.
