= Francesco Moriero =

Italian footballer and manager

Personal information
- Date of birth: 31 March 1969 (age 57)
- Place of birth: Lecce, Italy
- Height: 1.73 m (5 ft 8 in)
- Position: Right winger

Senior career*
Years	Team	Apps	(Gls)
1986–1992	Lecce	156	(13)
1992–1994	Cagliari	54	(4)
1994–1997	Roma	76	(8)
1997–2000	Inter Milan	56	(6)
2000–2002	Napoli	24	(1)
Total		366	(32)

International career
1998–1999	Italy	8	(2)

Managerial career
- 2006–2007: Africa Sports
- 2007–2008: Lanciano
- 2008–2009: Crotone
- 2009–2010: Frosinone
- 2010–2011: Grosseto
- 2011–2012: Lugano
- 2012: Grosseto
- 2013: Grosseto
- 2013: Lecce
- 2014: Catanzaro
- 2016: Catania
- 2017: Sambenedettese
- 2018: Sambenedettese
- 2019: Cavese
- 2020–2021: Dinamo Tirana
- 2021–2023: Maldives
- 2024–2025: Laçi
- 2025–2026: Flamurtari
- * Club domestic league appearances and goals

Francesco "Checco" Moriero (Italian pronunciation: [franˈtʃesko ˈkekko moˈrjɛːro]; born 31 March 1969) is an Italian football former player and current manager, who played as a midfielder, usually as a winger on the right flank.

Throughout his career, he played for several Italian clubs: Lecce, Cagliari, Roma, Inter Milan, and Napoli, winning an UEFA Cup title with Inter in 1998. A former Italy international, he took part at the 1998 FIFA World Cup.

== Club career ==
Francesco Moriero played for several Italian clubs throughout his career, including Lecce (1986–1992), Cagliari (1992–94), Roma (1994–97), Inter Milan (1997–2000), and Napoli (2000–2002).

Originally from Lecce, he began his career with the local club's youth side, making his professional debut with the senior Lecce side during the 1986–87 Serie B season. The following season, he made 35 appearances, scoring 3 goals, helping the team to gain promotion to Serie A. He played two seasons in Serie A with Lecce, making 86 appearances and scoring 4 goals, before Lecce were relegated to Serie B once again. During the 1991–92 Serie B season, he set a personal best of 6 goals in 34 appearances, before moving to Cagliari in 1992, where he made his debut in European competitions, notably helping the team to reach the semi-final of the 1993–94 UEFA Cup.

In 1994, he moved to Roma for 8.5 billion Lit. He spent 3 seasons with the club, becoming an important figure, making 75 appearances in Serie A, and scoring 8 goals. In May 1997, he had initially made a deal to sign for Milan, but in July, he signed with Inter for 1 million Lit. in an exchange between the two Milan clubs involving André Cruz, who was initially about to sign a contract with Inter.

He made his debut with Inter on the first matchday of the 1997–98 Serie A season, on 31 August 1997, against Brescia, at the Giuseppe Meazza Stadium. His most notable and successful career spell came with the Milan club, and in his first season, he won the 1997–98 UEFA Cup under manager Luigi Simoni, notably scoring a goal from a bicycle kick against the Swiss team Neuchatel Xamax during the tournament. In the final he also set up Ronaldo's goal shortly after coming on as a substitute. Inter also narrowly missed out on the Serie A title to Juventus that season, as Moriero made 28 league appearances that season, scoring 3 goals. Although he made fewer appearances during the next two seasons due to injury (making 28 appearances in Serie A in total, scoring 3 goals), he also later reached the 2000 Coppa Italia final with the club, under Marcello Lippi, before moving to Napoli in 2000. During the 2000–01 Serie A season, he made 14 appearances with Napoli, scoring a goal, although he was unable to save the club from relegation. He ended his career with the club in 2002, in Serie B. In total, he made 287 appearances in Serie A, scoring 21 goals.

== International career ==
After making an appearance with the Italy national under-21 football team in a 1–0 win over Greece on 7 February 1990, under manager Cesare Maldini, Moriero also played for the senior Italy national team; in total, he scored two goals in eight matches for Italy between 1998 and 1999. He made his senior international debut on 28 January 1998, in a 3–0 home win over Slovakia, providing two assists during the match; in his next appearance, in an international friendly against Paraguay on 22 April 1998, he scored his only two goals for Italy, one from a bicycle kick, as they won the match 3–1 at home. Moriero was a participant for Italy at the 1998 FIFA World Cup, under Cesare Maldini once again, where Italy were eliminated in the quarterfinals to hosts and eventual champions France on penalties. Although he was often alternated with the more defensive-minded Angelo Di Livio on the right wing, he still appeared in all five of Italy's matches during the tournament, and he assisted Christian Vieri's first goal in Italy's 3–0 win against Cameroon in their second group stage match, also starting the play for his second goal of the match. He also combined with Filippo Inzaghi to initiate the play which led to Roberto Baggio's match winning goal against Austria in Italy's final group match, as Italy won 2–1 to top their group. He made his final appearance for Italy on 9 October the following year, in a European qualifier against Belarus, under manager Dino Zoff, which ended in a 0–0 away draw.

== Coaching career ==
In 2006, soon after having successfully ended his studies at the Coverciano football coaching school, Moriero was appointed head coach of Ivorian club Africa Sports. On 27 July 2007, Africa Sports announced that they had sacked Moriero, appointing his assistant Salvatore Nobile as his replacement.

On 7 August, Moriero signed for Serie C1's Lanciano, guiding the club under massive financial issues that successively led to bankrupt, an auction-regulated sale and point deductions throughout the season. He successively guided Crotone to win the Lega Pro Prima Divisione playoffs and achieve promotion to Serie B in the 2008–09 season.

He then served as head coach of Serie B club Frosinone from July 2009 to April 2010.

In September 2010, he was named new head coach of Grosseto in the Italian Serie B, replacing Luigi Apolloni, but was dismissed later in January 2011 due to poor results. In the 2012–13 season, he was again named as head coach of Grosseto; on 1 October 2012, he was sacked.

On 30 June 2013, Moriero signed with his former club, Lecce, although he was dismissed 24 September.

On 1 July 2014, he was hired by Catanzaro, although he was later sacked once again by the club on 9 November.

In May 2017, he was appointed as coach of Sambenedettese. He was fired in November, but was later called back in April 2018. He left the club again on 30 June 2018.

In June 2019, he joined Cavese, but was fired in September after four Serie C matches without any wins.

On 30 December 2020, he was announced as the new head coach of Albanian club Dinamo Tirana, with Fabrizio Miccoli as his assistant. On 2 March 2021, both Moriero and Miccoli resigned from their coaching roles at the club, after having been in charge of only two league games for the Albanian club.

On 21 October 2021, Moriero was unveiled as the new head coach of the Maldives national football team on a two-year deal; his appointment made Moriero the first ever coach from a World Cup winning country to coach the Maldives in the history.

== Style of play ==
Moriero was a right-footed, quick, diminutive, energetic, and highly technical midfielder, who was predominantly used as right winger; although he was primarily an offensive minded player, with a penchant for making attacking runs, and who was even used as an outside forward on occasion, he was also known for his work-rate, tactical intelligence, and defensive contribution off the ball, as well as his ability to track back, which enabled him to cover the flank effectively. Moriero's main attributes were his acceleration, pace, dribbling skills, agility, flair, and creativity; these characteristics enabled him to beat opponents in one on one situations, get up the wing, and provide width to his team by overloading the flanks, giving his team a numerical advantage when attacking. He was also known for his ability to create chances and provide assists for strikers with his crossing ability and long balls from the right flank. He also had good vision and distribution, as well as a penchant for scoring with spectacular strikes from distance, or acrobatic goals from volleys and bicycle kicks. Regarded as one of the best wingers of his generation, during his prime, his world class performances, characteristics, playing style, and position on the pitch earned him comparisons with esteemed former Italian wingers Franco Causio, Bruno Conti, and Roberto Donadoni, as well as Portuguese winger Luís Figo. However, despite his talent, Moriero also garnered a reputation for being inconsistent at times. In addition to his skills and playing ability, Moriero was also known for his trademark celebration, which involved him pretending to polish his team-mates' football boots whenever they scored a goal.

== Honours ==
=== Player ===
Inter

- UEFA Cup: 1997–98
