= Graziano Cesari =

Italian football referee

- Born: 23 December 1956 (age 69); Parma, Italy

Domestic
| Years | League | Role |
| 1990–2002 | Serie A | Referee |

International
| Years | League | Role |
| 1994–2002 | FIFA listed | Referee |

Graziano Cesari (born 23 December 1956 in Parma, Italy) is a former Italian professional football referee. He was a full international for FIFA from 1994 until 2002. He officiated 167 matches in the Italian Serie A, and the 2001 Supercoppa Italiana between Roma and Fiorentina.

Cesari originally was named to the Italian Football Hall of Fame in 2016, however his award was later revoked due to a disciplinary action from 2003.

== Honours ==
- Premio Dattilo: 1995–96
- Giovanni Mauro Award for Best Italian International Referee of the Season: 2000
- ~~Italian Football Hall of Fame: 2016~~ (Revoked)
