= 1999–2000 AS Roma season =

Roma
1999–2000 season
- President: Franco Sensi
- Manager: Fabio Capello
- Stadium: Stadio Olimpico
- Serie A: 6th
- Coppa Italia: Quarter-finals
- UEFA Cup: Fourth round
- Top goalscorer: League: Vincenzo Montella (18); All: Vincenzo Montella (21)
Home colours	Away colours	Third colours

The 1999–2000 season saw Associazione Sportiva Roma continue its long drought of titles, finishing a frustrating 6th place in Serie A.

New manager Fabio Capello did not make an immediate impact, and its position actually worsened with one spot, despite 18 goals from Sampdoria signing Vincenzo Montella. Reward for Capello's new 3–4–1–2 system would come in 2000–01, however, when summer signings Gabriel Batistuta, Walter Samuel and Emerson completed the thin squad of the 1999–2000 season, and Roma was able to claim the title. That seemed far away as city rivals Lazio celebrated the 2000 league title.

== Players ==
=== Squad information ===
No.	Name	Nat	Position(s)	Date of birth (age)
Goalkeepers
1	Francesco Antonioli	(Italy)	GK	14 September 1969 (aged 30)
12	Cristiano Lupatelli	(Italy)	GK	21 June 1978 (aged 21)
25	Andrea Campagnolo	(Italy)	GK	17 June 1978 (aged 21)
Defenders
2	Cafu	(Brazil)	RB	30 November 1965 (aged 29)
3	Zago	(Brazil)	CB	14 March 1969 (aged 31)
6	Aldair	(Brazil)	CB	30 November 1965 (aged 34)
19	Sergei Gurenko	(Belarus)	CB	30 September 1972 (aged 27)
20	Amedeo Mangone	(Italy)	CB	12 July 1968 (aged 31)
23	Alessandro Rinaldi	(Italy)	CB	23 November 1974 (aged 25)
30	Fabio Petruzzi	(Italy)	CB	24 October 1970 (aged 29)
32	Vincent Candela	(France)	LB	24 October 1973 (aged 26)
Midfielders
4	Cristiano Zanetti	(Italy)	DM	14 April 1977 (aged 23)
5	Marcos Assunção	(Brazil)	CM	25 July 1976 (aged 23)
8	Hidetoshi Nakata	(Japan)	CM	22 January 1977 (aged 23)
11	Eusebio Di Francesco	(Italy)	CM	8 September 1969 (aged 30)
13	Manuele Blasi	(Italy)	LM	17 August 1980 (aged 19)
17	Damiano Tommasi	(Italy)	DM	17 May 1974 (aged 26)
16	Ivan Tomić	(Federal Republic of Yugoslavia)	CM	5 January 1976 (aged 24)
Strikers
7	Gustavo Bartelt	(Argentina)	CF	2 September 1974 (aged 25)
9	Vincenzo Montella	(Italy)	CF	18 June 1974 (aged 25)
10	Francesco Totti (c)	(Italy)	FW	27 September 1976 (aged 23)
18	Paolo Poggi	(Italy)	CF	16 February 1971 (aged 29)
24	Marco Delvecchio	(Italy)	CF	7 April 1973 (aged 27)
27	Fábio Júnior	(Brazil)	CF	20 November 1977 (aged 22)

=== Transfers ===
In
Pos.	Name	from	Type
FW	Vincenzo Montella	Sampdoria	€25.82 million
MF	Hidetoshi Nakata	Perugia	€21.69 million
GK	Francesco Antonioli	Bologna	
MF	Marcos Assunção	Flamengo	
MF	Cristiano Zanetti	Cagliari	
FW	Paolo Poggi	Udinese	
GK	Cristiano Lupatelli	Fidelis Andria	
DF	Sergei Gurenko	Lokomotiv Moscow	
DF	Amedeo Mangone	Bologna	
DF	Joseph Dayo Oshadogan	Foggia	
DF	Filippo Dal Moro	Ternana	
MF	Neşat Gülünoğlu	Vfl Bochum	
MF	Giuseppe Colucci	Foggia	
MF	Manuele Blasi	Lecce	

Out
Pos.	Name	To	Type
FW	Paulo Sérgio	Bayern Munich	€6.60 million
GK	Michael Konsel	Venezia	free
MF	Luigi Di Biagio	Internazionale	
DF	Pierre Womé	Bologna	
GK	Antonio Chimenti	Lecce	
GK	Giorgio Sterchele	Perugia	
DF	Omari Tetradze	PAOK	
DF	Luca Ferri	Lecco	
DF	Filippo Dal Moro	Lecco	loan
DF	Marco Quadrini	Genoa	
DF	Joseph Dayo Oshadogan	Reggina	
MF	Daniele Conti	Cagliari	
MF	Neşat Gülünoğlu	Siegen	free
MF	Dmitri Alenichev	Perugia	loan
MF	Giuseppe Colucci	Bordeaux	loan
MF	Daniele De Vezze	Savoia	
MF	Alessandro Frau	Palermo	
FW	Lampros Choutos	Olympiacos	
FW	Carmine Gautieri	Piacenza	

== Competitions ==
=== Overall ===
Competition	Started round	Final position	First match	Last match
Serie A	Matchday 1	6th	29 August 1999	14 May 2000
Coppa Italia	Round of 16	Quarter-finals	1 December 1999	25 January 2000
UEFA Cup	First round	Fourth round	16 September 1999	9 March 2000

Last updated: 14 May 2000

=== Serie A ===
==== League table ====
Pos	Team	Pld	W	D	L	GF	GA	GD	Pts	Qualification or relegation
4	Internazionale (Note: Internazionale entered the 2000–01 UEFA Champions League after winning the UEFA Champions League qualification match against Parma.)	34	17	7	10	58	36	+22	58	Qualification to Champions League third qualifying round
5	Parma	34	16	10	8	52	37	+15	58	Qualification to UEFA Cup first round
6	Roma	34	14	12	8	57	34	+23	54	Qualification to UEFA Cup first round
7	Fiorentina (Note: Fiorentina gained entry to the 2000–01 UEFA Cup as both 1999–2000 Coppa Italia finalists had qualified for the 2000–01 UEFA Champions League.)	34	13	12	9	48	38	+10	51	Qualification to UEFA Cup first round
8	Udinese	34	13	11	10	55	45	+10	50	Qualification to Intertoto Cup third round

Source: Serie A, RSSSF.com, Soccerway
Rules for classification: 1) Points; 2) Head-to-head points; 3) Head-to-head goal difference; 4) Goal difference; 5) Goals scored; 6) Draw. (Note: Head-to-head record is used only after all the matches between the teams in question have been played).

==== Results summary ====
Overall								Home						Away					
Pld	W	D	L	GF	GA	GD	Pts	W	D	L	GF	GA	GD	W	D	L	GF	GA	GD
34	14	12	8	57	34	+23	54	10	5	2	34	14	+20	4	7	6	23	20	+3

Last updated: 14 May 2000.
Source: Competitive matches

==== Results by round ====
Round	1	2	3	4	5	6	7	8	9	10	11	12	13	14	15	16	17	18	19	20	21	22	23	24	25	26	27	28	29	30	31	32	33	34
Ground	A	H	A	H	A	H	A	H	A	H	A	H	A	A	H	A	H	H	A	H	A	H	A	H	A	H	A	H	A	H	H	A	H	A
Result	D	D	W	W	W	L	D	D	W	W	W	W	L	L	W	D	W	W	L	W	D	W	L	W	L	L	L	D	D	W	D	D	D	D
Position	4	9	5	3	2	4	5	5	4	3	1	1	3	4	4	4	3	3	3	3	4	4	5	4	5	5	6	6	6	5	6	6	6	6

Source: http://calcio-seriea.net/allenatori_squadra/1999/1171/
A = Away; H = Home; W = Win; D = Draw; L = Loss; P = Postponed; = Leader, 2000–01 UEFA Champions League Group stage; = 2000–01 UEFA Champions League Group stage; = 2000–01 UEFA Champions League Qualifying round; = 2000–01 UEFA Cup First round; = Qualification to Intertoto Cup; = 2000–01 Serie B

==== Matches ====
29 August 1999 1	Piacenza	1–1	Roma	Piacenza
15:00 CEST (UTC+02:00)	Stroppa 82'	Report	Totti 14' (pen.)	Stadium: Stadio Leonardo Garilli; Referee: Pierluigi Collina

12 September 1999 2	Roma	0–0	Internazionale	Rome
20:30 CEST (UTC+02:00)		Report		Stadium: Stadio Olimpico; Referee: Domenico Messina

19 September 1999 3	Venezia	1–3	Roma	Venice
15:00 CEST (UTC+02:00)	Petković 58'	Report	Delvecchio 38', 45+2'; Alenichev 71'	Stadium: Stadio Pier Luigi Penzo; Referee: Emilio Pellegrino

26 September 1999 4	Roma	3–1	Perugia	Rome
15:00 CEST (UTC+02:00)	Montella 37'; Assunção 47'; Totti 83' (pen.)	Report	Olive 82'	Stadium: Stadio Olimpico; Referee: Tarcisio Serena

3 October 1999 5	Fiorentina	1–3	Roma	Florence
15:00 CEST (UTC+02:00)	Batistuta 75'	Report	Cafu 17', 67'; Tommasi 59'	Stadium: Stadio Artemio Franchi; Referee: Domenico Messina

17 October 1999 6	Roma	0–1	Juventus	Rome
20:30 CEST (UTC+02:00)		Report	Zidane 50'	Stadium: Stadio Olimpico; Referee: Fiorenzo Treossi

24 October 1999 7	Torino	1–1	Roma	Turin
20:30 CEST (UTC+02:00)	Scarchilli 21'	Report	Di Francesco 55'	Stadium: Stadio delle Alpi; Referee: Salvatore Racalbuto

31 October 1999 8	Roma	2–2	Cagliari	Rome
15:00 CET (UTC+01:00)	Montella 2'; Zago 40'	Report	Oliveira 15'; Mboma 85' (pen.)	Stadium: Stadio Olimpico; Referee: Alfredo Trentalange

7 November 1999 9	Reggina	0–4	Roma	Reggio Calabria
15:00 CET (UTC+01:00)		Report	Oshadogan 4' (o.g.); Montella 28' (pen.); Fábio Júnior 39'; Totti 45+1' (pen.)	Stadium: Stadio Oreste Granillo; Referee: Stefano Braschi

21 November 1999 10	Roma	4–1	Lazio	Rome
15:00 CET (UTC+01:00)	Delvecchio 7', 26'; Montella 11', 31'	Report	Mihajlović 52' (pen.)	Stadium: Stadio Olimpico; Referee: Daniele Tombolini

28 November 1999 11	Udinese	0–2	Roma	Udine
15:00 CET (UTC+01:00)		Report	Montella 73', 87'	Stadium: Stadio Friuli; Referee: Salvatore Racalbuto

5 December 1999 12	Roma	3–2	Lecce	Rome
15:00 CET (UTC+01:00)	Totti 41'; Candela 63', 86'	Report	Sesa 50'; Pivotto 69'	Stadium: Stadio Olimpico; Referee: Diego Preschern

12 December 1999 13	Bologna	1–0	Roma	Bologna
15:00 CET (UTC+01:00)	Signori 25'	Report		Stadium: Stadio Renato Dall'Ara; Referee: Pierluigi Collina

19 December 1999 14	Parma	2–0	Roma	Parma
15:00 CET (UTC+01:00)	Crespo 2'; Torrisi 24'	Report		Stadium: Stadio Ennio Tardini; Referee: Fiorenzo Treossi

6 January 2000 15	Roma	3–1	Bari	Rome
15:00 CET (UTC+01:00)	Montella 2', 29', 58' (pen.)	Report	Cassano 4'	Stadium: Stadio Olimpico; Referee: Roberto Rosetti

9 January 2000 16	Milan	2–2	Roma	Milan
20:30 CET (UTC+01:00)	Bierhoff 38'; José Mari 67'	Report	Delvecchio 8'; Montella 57'	Stadium: San Siro; Referee: Livio Bazzoli

16 January 2000 17	Roma	3–1	Hellas Verona	Rome
15:00 CET (UTC+01:00)	Montella 1'; Apolloni 7' (o.g.); Totti 41'	Report	Salvetti 20'	Stadium: Stadio Olimpico; Referee: Danilo Nucini

22 January 2000 18	Roma	2–1	Piacenza	Rome
18:00 CET (UTC+01:00)	Di Francesco 47'; Totti 75'	Report	Piovani 45+3'	Stadium: Stadio Olimpico; Referee: Emilio Pellegrino

30 January 2000 19	Internazionale	2–1	Roma	Milan
20:30 CET (UTC+01:00)	Vieri 8'; R. Baggio 42'	Report	Aldair 32'	Stadium: San Siro; Referee: Salvatore Racalbuto

6 February 2000 20	Roma	5–0	Venezia	Rome
15:00 CET (UTC+01:00)	Candela 9'; Delvecchio 13', 61'; Montella 41'; Ngotty 78' (o.g.)	Report		Stadium: Stadio Olimpico; Referee: Danilo Nucini

13 February 2000 21	Perugia	2–2	Roma	Perugia
15:00 CET (UTC+01:00)	Olive 55', 80'	Report	Nakata 24'; Montella 42' (pen.)	Stadium: Stadio Renato Curi; Referee: Gennaro Borriello

19 February 2000 22	Roma	4–0	Fiorentina	Rome
20:30 CET (UTC+01:00)	Montella 6', 80', 90'; Nakata 27'	Report		Stadium: Stadio Olimpico; Referee: Salvatore Racalbuto

27 February 2000 23	Juventus	2–1	Roma	Turin
20:30 CET (UTC+01:00)	Davids 31'; Inzaghi 46'	Report	Delvecchio 38'	Stadium: Stadio delle Alpi; Referee: Stefano Braschi

5 March 2000 24	Roma	1–0	Torino	Rome
15:00 CET (UTC+01:00)	Delvecchio 65'	Report		Stadium: Stadio Olimpico; Referee: Daniele Tombolini

12 March 2000 25	Cagliari	1–0	Roma	Cagliari
15:00 CET (UTC+01:00)	Mboma 44'	Report		Stadium: Stadio Sant'Elia; Referee: Gianluca Paparesta

19 March 2000 26	Roma	0–2	Reggina	Rome
15:00 CET (UTC+01:00)		Report	Cozza 28'; Cirillo 86'	Stadium: Stadio Olimpico; Referee: Daniele Tombolini

25 March 2000 27	Lazio	2–1	Roma	Rome
15:00 CET (UTC+01:00)	Nedvěd 25'; Verón 28'	Report	Montella 3'	Stadium: Stadio Olimpico; Referee: Domenico Messina

2 April 2000 28	Roma	1–1	Udinese	Rome
15:00 CEST (UTC+02:00)	Nakata 39'	Report	Sosa 51'	Stadium: Stadio Olimpico; Referee: Paolo Bertini

9 April 2000 29	Lecce	0–0	Roma	Lecce
15:00 CEST (UTC+02:00)		Report		Stadium: Stadio Via del Mare; Referee: Diego Preschern

16 April 2000 30	Roma	2–0	Bologna	Rome
15:00 CEST (UTC+02:00)	Montella 27' (pen.); Totti 60' (pen.)	Report		Stadium: Stadio Olimpico; Referee: Angelo Bonfrisco

22 April 2000 31	Roma	0–0	Parma	Rome
15:00 CEST (UTC+02:00)		Report		Stadium: Stadio Olimpico; Referee: Roberto Rosetti

30 April 2000 32	Bari	0–0	Roma	Bari
15:00 CEST (UTC+02:00)		Report		Stadium: Stadio San Nicola; Referee: Daniele Tombolini

7 May 2000 33	Roma	1–1	Milan	Rome
15:00 CEST (UTC+02:00)	Zago 11'	Report	Shevchenko 82' (pen.)	Stadium: Stadio Olimpico; Referee: Alfredo Trentalange

14 May 2000 34	Hellas Verona	2–2	Roma	Verona
15:00 CEST (UTC+02:00)	Adaílton 13'; Cammarata 56'	Report	Tommasi 8'; Montella 44'	Stadium: Stadio Marc'Antonio Bentegodi; Referee: Stefano Braschi

=== Coppa Italia ===
==== Round of 16 ====
1 December 1999 First leg	Roma	0–1	Piacenza	Rome
20:30 CET (UTC+01:00)			Piovani 49'	Stadium: Stadio Olimpico; Attendance: 7,753; Referee: Gianluca Paparesta

15 December 1999 Second leg	Piacenza	0–3 (a.e.t.) (1–3 agg.)	Roma	Piacenza
20:30 CET (UTC+01:00)			Rinaldi 55'; Di Francesco 113'; Candela 118'	Stadium: Stadio Leonardo Garilli; Attendance: 2,500; Referee: Stefano Farina

==== Quarter-finals ====
12 January 2000 First leg	Roma	0–1	Cagliari	Rome
18:00 CET (UTC+01:00)			Oliveira 22'	Stadium: Stadio Olimpico; Attendance: 7,800; Referee: Diego Preschern

25 January 2000 Second leg	Cagliari	1–0 (2–0 agg.)	Roma	Cagliari
20:30 CET (UTC+01:00)	O'Neill 80'			Stadium: Stadio Sant'Elia; Attendance: 15,000; Referee: Domenico Messina

=== UEFA Cup ===
==== First round ====
16 September 1999 First leg	Roma (Italy)	7–0	(Portugal) Vitória de Setúbal	Rome, Italy
21:30 CEST (UTC+02:00)	Aldair 12'; Montella 14'; Alenichev 16', 55', 77'; Assunção 40'; Delvecchio 73'; Cafu (yellow card) 88'	Report	Frechaut (yellow card) 34'; Quim (yellow card) 38'	Stadium: Stadio Olimpico; Attendance: 23,013; Referee: Vasyl Melnychuk (Ukraine)

30 September 1999 Second leg	Vitória de Setúbal (Portugal)	1–0 (1–7 agg.)	(Italy) Roma	Setúbal, Portugal
22:30 CEST (UTC+02:00)	Makinwa 77'	Report	Rinaldi (yellow card) 16'; Alenichev (yellow card) 23'; Zanetti (yellow card) 68'	Stadium: Estádio do Bonfim; Attendance: 4,000; Referee: Dieter Schoch (Switzerland)

==== Second round ====
21 October 1999 First leg	IFK Göteborg (Sweden)	0–2	(Italy) Roma	Gothenburg, Sweden
19:00 CEST (UTC+02:00)	Svensson (yellow card) 68'	Report	Montella 36', 51'	Stadium: Ullevi; Attendance: 20,000; Referee: Dermot Gallagher (England)

4 November 1999 Second leg	Roma (Italy)	1–0 (3–0 agg.)	(Sweden) IFK Göteborg	Rome, Italy
18:00 CET (UTC+01:00)	Assunção (yellow card) 52'; Fábio Júnior 86'	Report	Mild (yellow card) 43'; Svensson (yellow card) 68'	Stadium: Stadio Olimpico; Attendance: 9,767; Referee: Víctor Esquinas Torres (Spain)

==== Third round ====
25 November 1999 First leg	Roma (Italy)	1–0	(England) Newcastle United	Rome, Italy
21:15 CET (UTC+01:00)	Zago (yellow card) 25'; Totti 50' (pen.), (yellow card) 89'; Aldair (yellow card) 65'	Report	Shearer (yellow card) 68'	Stadium: Stadio Olimpico; Attendance: 45,655; Referee: Claude Colombo (France)

9 December 1999 Second leg	Newcastle United (England)	0–0 (0–1 agg.)	(Italy) Roma	Newcastle upon Tyne, England
21:15 CET (UTC+01:00)	Lee (yellow card) 53'; Glass (yellow card) 89'	Report	Delvecchio (yellow card) 29'; Di Francesco (yellow card) 86'; Zago (yellow card) 89'	Stadium: St James' Park; Attendance: 35,739; Referee: Hartmut Strampe (Germany)

==== Round of 16 ====
2 March 2000 First leg	Roma (Italy)	0–0	(England) Leeds United	Rome, Italy
18:00 CET (UTC+01:00)		Report	Radebe (yellow card) 62'	Stadium: Stadio Olimpico; Attendance: 37,726; Referee: Gilles Veissière (France)

9 March 2000 Second leg	Leeds United (England)	1–0 (1–0 agg.)	(Italy) Roma	Leeds, England
21:00 CET (UTC+01:00)	Bridges (yellow card) 39'; Haaland (yellow card) 63'; Kewell 67'; Smith (yellow card) 89'	Report	Totti (yellow card) 23'; Candela (yellow card) 39' (red card) 89'; Delvecchio (yellow card) 59'; Zago (yellow card) 89' (yellow-red card)	Stadium: Elland Road; Attendance: 39,149; Referee: José María García-Aranda (Spain)

== Statistics ==
=== Players statistics ===
No.	Pos	Nat	Player	Total		Serie A		UEFA	
No.	Pos	Nat	Player	Apps	Goals	Apps	Goals	Apps	Goals
1	GK	(Italy) ITA	Antonioli	38	-33	30	-31	8	-2
2	DF	(Brazil) BRA	Cafu	33	2	28	2	5	0
6	DF	(Brazil) BRA	Aldair	42	2	34	1	8	1
3	DF	(Brazil) BRA	Zago	35	2	25+2	2	8	0
32	DF	(France) FRA	Candela	34	3	26	3	8	0
17	MF	(Italy) ITA	Tommasi	39	2	25+8	2	5+1	0
11	MF	(Italy) ITA	Di Francesco	37	2	24+6	2	4+3	0
5	MF	(Brazil) BRA	Assunção	27	2	20+1	1	6	1
10	FW	(Italy) ITA	Totti (c)	32	8	27	7	4+1	1
9	FW	(Italy) ITA	Montella	38	21	30+1	18	7	3
24	FW	(Italy) ITA	Delvecchio	34	12	27+1	11	6	1
12	GK	(Italy) ITA	Lupatelli	4	-3	4	-3	0	0
20	DF	(Italy) ITA	Mangone	28	0	19+6	0	3	0
23	DF	(Italy) ITA	Rinaldi	29	0	18+5	0	6	0
8	MF	(Japan) JPN	Nakata	17	3	15	3	2	0
4	MF	(Italy) ITA	Zanetti	13	0	6+5	0	1+1	0
18	FW	(Italy) ITA	Poggi	11	0	4+7	0		
8	MF	(Russia) RUS	Alenichev	10	4	3+4	1	2+1	3
27	FW	(Brazil) BRA	Fábio Júnior	13	2	1+8	1	3+1	1
19	DF	(Belarus) BLR	Gurenko	9	0	1+4	0	2+2	0
13	MF	(Italy) ITA	Blasi	5	0	1+4	0		
16	MF	(Federal Republic of Yugoslavia) YUG	Tomić	1	0	0+1	0		
7	FW	(Argentina) ARG	Bartelt	3	0	0+3	0		
25	FW	(Greece) GRE	Choutos	3	0	0+2	0	0+1	0
26	MF	(Guinea-Bissau) GNB	Ednilson	1	0	0+1	0		
14	MF	(Italy) ITA	Gautieri	1	0	0+1	0		
25	GK	(Italy) ITA	Campagnolo	0	0	0	0		
30	DF	(Italy) ITA	Petruzzi	0	0	0	0		
34	GK	(Italy) ITA	Amelia	0	0	0	0		
1	GK	(Austria) AUT	Konsel	0	0	0	0		
21	MF	(Italy) ITA	D'Agostino	0	0	0	0		
	MF	(Italy) ITA	Bonanni	0	0	0	0		
31	DF	(Italy) ITA	Ferri	0	0	0	0		
	DF	(Italy) ITA	Zamperini	0	0	0	0		
15	MF	(Italy) ITA	Colucci						

- Source: http://calcio-seriea.net/rose/1999/1175/

=== Goalscorers ===
- (Italy) Vincenzo Montella 18 (4)
- (Italy) Marco Delvecchio 11
- (Italy) Francesco Totti 7 (4)
- (France) Vincent Candela 3
