= 1998–99 AS Roma season =

Roma
1998–99 season
- President: Franco Sensi
- Manager: Zdeněk Zeman
- Stadium: Stadio Olimpico
- Serie A: 5th
- Coppa Italia: Round of 16
- UEFA Cup: Quarter-finals
- Top goalscorer: League: Marco Delvecchio (18); All: Marco Delvecchio (18)
Home colours	Away colours	Third colours

Associazione Sportiva Roma was left trailing in the wake of city rivals Lazio's resurgence to fight for domestic and international glory. In coach Zdeněk Zeman's second season at the reins, Roma finished fifth in the table, and just missed out on qualification for the final Champions League spot. Roma reached the quarter-finals of the UEFA Cup, but lost to Atlético Madrid.

Zeman employed an attacking 4–3–3 formation. Forwards Marco Delvecchio, Francesco Totti and Paulo Sérgio scored 42 league goals between them. As a team, Roma scored the most goals in Serie A, but poor defensive play led to them conceding 49 goals, the most of any of the top six teams.

== Players ==
Note: Flags indicate national team as defined under FIFA eligibility rules; some limited exceptions apply. Players may hold more than one non-FIFA nationality.

No.	Pos.	Nation	Player
1	GK	AUT	Michael Konsel
2	DF	BRA	Cafu
3	DF	BRA	Antonio Carlos
4	MF	ITA	Luigi Di Biagio
5	DF	FRA	Vincent Candela
6	DF	BRA	Aldair
7	FW	BRA	Paulo Sérgio
8	MF	RUS	Dmitri Alenichev
9	FW	ARG	Gustavo Bartelt
10	FW	ITA	Francesco Totti
11	MF	ITA	Eusebio Di Francesco
12	GK	ITA	Antonio Chimenti
13	MF	ITA	Fabio Petruzzi

No.	Pos.	Nation	Player
14	FW	ITA	Carmine Gautieri
15	DF	CMR	Pierre Womé
16	MF	YUG	Ivan Tomić
17	MF	ITA	Damiano Tommasi
18	FW	ITA	Alessandro Frau
19	DF	ITA	Marco Quadrini
21	DF	RUS	Omari Tetradze
22	GK	ITA	Andrea Campagnolo
23	MF	ITA	Daniele Conti
24	FW	ITA	Marco Delvecchio
27	FW	BRA	Fábio Júnior
—	FW	ITA	Filippo Dal Moro

=== Transfers ===
In
Pos.	Name	from	Type
FW	Fábio Júnior	Cruzeiro	€13.80 million
MF	Ivan Tomić	Partizan	
FW	Gustavo Bartelt	Lanus	
MF	Dmitri Alenichev	Spartak Moscow	€6.15 million
DF	Pierre Womé	Lucchese	
GK	Marvin Ficarra	-	
MF	Alessandro Frau	Torres	
GK	Giorgio Sterchele	Bologna	loan ended

Out
Pos.	Name	To	Type
FW	Abel Balbo	Parma	
DF	Cristian Servidei	Ternana	
DF	Matteo Pivotto	Chievo	
DF	Stefano Fanucci	Teramo	
MF	Vágner	Vasco da Gama	
MF	Daniele Bordacconi	Foggia	
MF	Cristiano Scapolo	Napoli	
DF	Filippo Dal Moro	Ternana	loan
MF	Manuele Blasi	Lecce	loan
GK	Giorgio Sterchele	Ternana	loan

== Competitions ==
=== Overall ===
Competition	Started round	Final position	First match	Last match
Serie A	Matchday 1	5th	12 September 1998	23 May 1999
Coppa Italia	Round of 32	Round of 16	9 September 1998	12 November 1998
UEFA Cup	First round	Quarter-finals	15 September 1998	16 March 1999

Last updated: 23 May 1999

=== Serie A ===
==== League table ====
Pos	Team	Pld	W	D	L	GF	GA	GD	Pts	Qualification or relegation
3	Fiorentina	34	16	8	10	55	41	+14	56	Qualification to Champions League third qualifying round
4	Parma	34	15	10	9	55	36	+19	55	Qualification to Champions League third qualifying round
5	Roma	34	15	9	10	69	49	+20	54 (Note: ROM 7pts. JUV 5pts. UDI 4pts.)	Qualification to UEFA Cup first round
6	Udinese (Note: Udinese gained entry to the 1999–2000 UEFA Cup winning the UEFA Cup qualification match against Juventus)	34	16	6	12	52	52	0	54	Qualification to UEFA Cup first round
7	Juventus (Note: Juventus qualified to the 1999 UEFA Intertoto Cup Third round.)	34	15	9	10	42	36	+6	54	Qualification to Intertoto Cup third round

Source: Serie A, RSSSF.com, Soccerway
Rules for classification: 1) Points; 2) Head-to-head points; 3) Head-to-head goal difference; 4) Goal difference; 5) Goals scored; 6) Draw. (Note: Head-to-head record is used only after all the matches between the teams in question have been played).

==== Results summary ====
Overall								Home						Away					
Pld	W	D	L	GF	GA	GD	Pts	W	D	L	GF	GA	GD	W	D	L	GF	GA	GD
34	15	9	10	69	49	+20	54	13	3	1	43	16	+27	2	6	9	26	33	−7

Last updated: 23 May 1999.
Source: Competitive matches

==== Results by round ====
Round	1	2	3	4	5	6	7	8	9	10	11	12	13	14	15	16	17	18	19	20	21	22	23	24	25	26	27	28	29	30	31	32	33	34
Ground	H	A	H	A	H	A	H	A	H	H	A	H	A	A	H	A	H	A	H	A	H	A	H	A	H	A	A	H	A	H	H	A	H	A
Result	W	D	W	L	W	L	W	D	W	D	D	W	D	L	D	L	W	L	D	L	W	D	W	L	W	D	W	W	L	W	L	L	W	W
Position	2	5	3	6	2	5	3	3	2	2	3	2	3	5	5	6	5	6	6	7	7	8	7	8	7	7	5	5	5	5	5	6	5	5

Source: Competitive matches
A = Away; H = Home; W = Win; D = Draw; L = Loss; = Leader, UEFA Champions League Groups stage; = UEFA Champions League Groups stage; = UEFA Champions League Qualifying round; = 1999–2000 UEFA Cup; = 1999 UEFA Intertoto Cup; = 1999–2000 Serie B

==== Matches ====
12 September 1998 1	Roma	3–1	Salernitana	Rome
	Paulo Sérgio 47', 83'; Totti 61'	Report	Song 41'	Stadium: Stadio Olimpico; Referee: Cosimo Bolognino

20 September 1998 2	Empoli	0–0	Roma	Empoli
		Report		Stadium: Stadio Carlo Castellani; Referee: Pierluigi Collina

26 September 1998 3	Roma	2–0	Venezia	Rome
	Delvecchio 1', 14'	Report		Stadium: Stadio Olimpico; Referee: Fiorenzo Treossi

4 October 1998 4	Sampdoria	2–1	Roma	Genoa
	Palmieri 61'; Iacopino 74'	Report	Delvecchio 26'	Stadium: Stadio Luigi Ferraris; Referee: Daniele Tombolini

17 October 1998 5	Roma	2–1	Fiorentina	Rome
	Alenichev 89'; Totti 90+4'	Report	Batistuta 32'	Stadium: Stadio Olimpico; Referee: Livio Bazzoli

25 October 1998 6	Milan	3–2	Roma	Milan
	Leonardo 45+3'; Ziege 59'; Weah 72'	Report	Delvecchio 9', 70'	Stadium: San Siro; Referee: Pierluigi Collina

31 October 1998 7	Roma	4–0	Udinese	Rome
	Di Francesco 44'; Totti 52', 71' (pen.); Paulo Sérgio 62'	Report		Stadium: Stadio Olimpico; Referee: Domenico Messina

8 November 1998 8	Bologna	1–1	Roma	Bologna
	Signori 18'	Report	Paulo Sérgio 15'	Stadium: Stadio Renato Dall'Ara; Referee: Alfredo Trentalange

15 November 1998 9	Roma	2–0	Juventus	Rome
	Paulo Sérgio 45'; Candela 87'	Report		Stadium: Stadio Olimpico; Referee: Stefano Braschi

21 November 1998 10	Roma	1–1	Bari	Rome
	Totti 83' (pen.)	Report	Masinga 77'	Stadium: Stadio Olimpico; Referee: Livio Bazzoli

29 November 1998 11	Lazio	3–3	Roma	Rome
	Mancini 28', 56'; Salas 69' (pen.)	Report	Delvecchio 25'; Di Francesco 78'; Totti 81'	Stadium: Stadio Olimpico; Referee: Stefano Farina

5 December 1998 12	Roma	5–1	Perugia	Rome
	Totti 61'; Conti 63'; Delvecchio 78', 80'; Gautieri 90+1'	Report	Rapaić 33'	Stadium: Stadio Olimpico; Referee: Roberto Bettin

13 December 1998 13	Parma	1–1	Roma	Parma
	Fuser 40'	Report	Gautieri 62'	Stadium: Stadio Ennio Tardini; Referee: Robert Anthony Boggi

20 December 1998 14	Internazionale	4–1	Roma	Milan
	Cauet 59'; Zamorano 77'; R. Baggio 87'; J. Zanetti 89'	Report	Paulo Sérgio 38'	Stadium: San Siro; Referee: Emilio Pellegrino

6 January 1999 15	Roma	2–2	Piacenza	Rome
	Di Francesco 27'; Tommasi 53'	Report	Stroppa 38'; Dal Moro 48' (o.g.)	Stadium: Stadio Olimpico; Referee: Cosimo Bolognino

10 January 1999 16	Cagliari	4–3	Roma	Cagliari
	Muzzi 3', 64'; O'Neill 45+2', 90'	Report	Delvecchio 27', 41'; Gautieri 80'	Stadium: Stadio Sant'Elia; Referee: Stefano Braschi

17 January 1999 17	Roma	3–0	Vicenza	Rome
	Di Francesco 6'; Delvecchio 44'; Gautieri 79'	Report		Stadium: Stadio Olimpico; Referee: Stefano Farina

24 January 1999 18	Salernitana	2–1	Roma	Salerno
	Bernardini 12' (pen.); Giampaolo 54'	Report	Di Biagio 77'	Stadium: Stadio Arechi; Referee: Emilio Pellegrino

31 January 1999 19	Roma	1–1	Empoli	Rome
	Paulo Sérgio 56'	Report	Cerbone 90+2'	Stadium: Stadio Olimpico; Referee: Pierluigi Collina

7 February 1999 20	Venezia	3–1	Roma	Venice
	Recoba 2'; Maniero 48'; Ballarin 66'	Report	Di Biagio 68'	Stadium: Stadio Pier Luigi Penzo; Referee: Fiorenzo Treossi

14 February 1999 21	Roma	3–1	Sampdoria	Rome
	Fábio Júnior 10'; Paulo Sérgio 84', 88'	Report	Lassissi 15'	Stadium: Stadio Olimpico; Referee: Stefano Farina

21 February 1999 22	Fiorentina	0–0	Roma	Florence
		Report		Stadium: Stadio Artemio Franchi; Referee: Gennaro Borriello

27 February 1999 23	Roma	1–0	Milan	Rome
	Paulo Sérgio 64'	Report		Stadium: Stadio Olimpico; Referee: Roberto Bettin

7 March 1999 24	Udinese	2–1	Roma	Udine
	Jørgensen 84'; Amoroso 88'	Report	Fábio Júnior 28'	Stadium: Stadio Friuli; Referee: Roberto Bettin

13 March 1999 25	Roma	3–1	Bologna	Rome
	Delvecchio 10', 39'; Gautieri 61'	Report	Andersson 68'	Stadium: Stadio Olimpico; Referee: Livio Bazzoli

21 March 1999 26	Juventus	1–1	Roma	Turin
	Iuliano 72'	Report	Delvecchio 52'	Stadium: Stadio delle Alpi; Referee: Gennaro Borriello

3 April 1999 27	Bari	1–4	Roma	Bari
	Masinga 60'	Report	Di Biagio 13', 55'; Cafu 79'; Di Francesco 84'	Stadium: Stadio San Nicola; Referee: Stefano Farina

11 April 1999 28	Roma	3–1	Lazio	Rome
	Delvecchio 13', 43'; Totti 90'	Report	Vieri 79'	Stadium: Stadio Olimpico; Referee: Gennaro Borriello

18 April 1999 29	Perugia	3–2	Roma	Perugia
	Tedesco 22'; Petrachi 45'; Rapaić 89'	Report	Matrecano 23' (o.g.); Di Francesco 40'	Stadium: Stadio Renato Curi; Referee: Pierluigi Collina

25 April 1999 30	Roma	1–0	Parma	Rome
	Totti 82'	Report		Stadium: Stadio Olimpico; Referee: Roberto Bettin

3 May 1999 31	Roma	4–5	Internazionale	Rome
	Totti 26' (pen.); Paulo Sérgio 47'; Delvecchio 49'; Di Francesco 79'	Report	Ronaldo 17', 56'; Zamorano 22', 35'; Simeone 87'	Stadium: Stadio Olimpico; Referee: Pierluigi Collina

9 May 1999 32	Piacenza	2–0	Roma	Piacenza
	Rastelli 32'; Statuto 81'	Report		Stadium: Stadio Leonardo Garilli; Referee: Cosimo Bolognino

16 May 1999 33	Roma	3–1	Cagliari	Rome
	Totti 16', 77'; Di Francesco 33'	Report	Mboma 46'	Stadium: Stadio Olimpico; Referee: Livio Bazzoli

23 May 1999 34	Vicenza	1–4	Roma	Vicenza
	Ambrosetti 79'	Report	Paulo Sérgio 46'; Delvecchio 62'; Gautieri 78'; Fábio Júnior 81'	Stadium: Stadio Romeo Menti; Referee: Alfredo Trentalange

=== Coppa Italia ===
==== Second round ====
9 September 1998 First leg	Chievo	2–2	Roma	Verona
20:30 CEST (UTC+02:00)	Cerbone 15'; Franceschini 45'		Bartelt 54'; Gautieri 56'	Stadium: Stadio Marc'Antonio Bentegodi; Attendance: 3,363; Referee: Stefano Farina

22 September 1998 Second leg	Roma	2–1 (4–3 agg.)	Chievo	Rome
20:30 CEST (UTC+02:00)	Alenichev 63'; Gautieri 80'		Veronese 20'	Stadium: Stadio Olimpico; Attendance: 8,491; Referee: Robert Anthony Boggi

==== Round of 16 ====
28 October 1998 First leg	Atalanta	1–1	Roma	Bergamo
20:30 CET (UTC+01:00)	Zanini 2'		Delvecchio 30'	Stadium: Stadio Atleti Azzurri d'Italia; Attendance: 10,000; Referee: Gennaro Borriello

12 November 1998 Second leg	Roma	1–1 (a.e.t.) (2–2 agg.) (4–5 p)	Atalanta	Rome
20:30 CET (UTC+01:00)	Totti 80'		Caccia 77'	Stadium: Stadio Olimpico; Attendance: 8,731; Referee: Livio Bazzoli
	Penalties
	Di Biagio (penalty scored); Di Francesco (penalty scored); Delvecchio (penalty missed); Totti (penalty scored); Frau (penalty scored)		(penalty scored) Banchelli; (penalty scored) Bonacina; (penalty scored) Regonesi; (penalty scored) Caccia; (penalty scored) Zenoni

=== UEFA Cup ===
==== First round ====
15 September 1998 First leg	Silkeborg (Denmark)	0–2	(Italy) Roma	Silkeborg, Denmark
16:00 CEST (UTC+02:00)	Zivkovic (yellow card) 45'	Report	Totti 63'; Alenichev 70'	Stadium: Silkeborg Stadion; Attendance: 4,500; Referee: Valentin Ivanov (Russia)

29 September 1998 Second leg	Roma (Italy)	1–0 (3–0 agg.)	(Denmark) Silkeborg	Rome, Italy
20:45 CEST (UTC+02:00)	Delvecchio 53'; Di Biagio (yellow card) 68'; Cafu (yellow card) 89'	Report	Knudsen (yellow card) 30'; Duus (yellow card) 44'; Sørensen (yellow card) 77'	Stadium: Stadio Olimpico; Attendance: 21,247; Referee: Roelof Luinge (Netherlands)

==== Second round ====
20 October 1998 First leg	Roma (Italy)	1–0	(England) Leeds United	Rome, Italy
20:45 CEST (UTC+02:00)	Delvecchio 18'; Di Biagio (yellow card) 33'; Di Francesco (yellow card) 39'; Aldair (yellow card) 85'	Report	Ribeiro (red card) 54'	Stadium: Stadio Olimpico; Attendance: 43,000; Referee: Antonio Jesús López Nieto (Spain)

3 November 1998 Second leg	Leeds United (England)	0–0 (0–1 agg.)	(Italy) Roma	Leeds, England
21:05 CET (UTC+01:00)	Hasselbaink (yellow card) 38'; Bowyer (yellow card) 88'	Report	Di Francesco (yellow card) 9'; Womé (red card) 45'; Petruzzi (yellow card) 79'	Stadium: Elland Road; Attendance: 39,161; Referee: Bernd Heynemann (Germany)

==== Third round ====
24 November 1998 First leg	Roma (Italy)	1–0	(Switzerland) Zürich	Rome, Italy
16:00 CET (UTC+01:00)	Zago (yellow card) 45'; Tomić (yellow card) 73'; Totti (yellow card) 76', (goal) 90+2' (pen.); Dal Moro (yellow card) 90'	Report	Chassot (yellow card) 19'; Castillo (yellow card) 27'; Del Signore (yellow card) 84'; Lima (yellow card) 88'	Stadium: Stadio Olimpico; Attendance: 19,375; Referee: William Young (Scotland)

8 December 1998 Second leg	Zürich (Switzerland)	2–2 (2–3 agg.)	(Italy) Roma	Zürich, Switzerland
20:45 CET (UTC+01:00)	Chassot (yellow card) 37'; Bartlett 60', 80'; Huber (yellow card) 64'; Fischer (yellow card) 89'	Report	Delvecchio 14'; Paulo Sérgio (yellow card) 58'; Petruzzi (yellow card) 65'; Di Biagio (yellow card) 85'; Totti 90'	Stadium: Letzigrund; Attendance: 15,200; Referee: Manuel Díaz Vega (Spain)

==== Quarter-finals ====
2 March 1999 First leg	Atlético Madrid (Spain)	2–1	(Italy) Roma	Madrid, Spain
21:30 CET (UTC+01:00)	José Mari 13'; Santi (yellow card) 42'; Roberto 46'	Report	Aldair (yellow card) 69'; Di Biagio 75'	Stadium: Vicente Calderón; Attendance: 40,000; Referee: Alain Sars (France)

16 March 1999 Second leg	Roma (Italy)	1–2 (2–4 agg.)	(Spain) Atlético Madrid	Rome, Italy
21:30 CET (UTC+01:00)	Womé (red card) 28'; Delvecchio 32', (yellow card) 62'; Aldair (yellow card) 35'; Totti (yellow card) 88' (yellow-red card); Zago (yellow card) 89'	Report	Baraja (yellow card) 15'; Jugović (yellow card) 48'; Aguilera 60'; Toni (yellow card) 65'; Roberto 88'	Stadium: Stadio Olimpico; Attendance: 64,485; Referee: Mario van der Ende (Netherlands)

== Statistics ==
=== Players statistics ===
No.	Pos	Nat	Player	Total		Serie A		Coppa		UEFA	
No.	Pos	Nat	Player	Apps	Goals	Apps	Goals	Apps	Goals	Apps	Goals
12	GK	(Italy) ITA	Chimenti	36	-43	23+1	-32	4	-5	8	-6
2	DF	(Brazil) BRA	Cafu	27	1	20	1	1	0	6	0
3	DF	(Brazil) BRA	Antonio Carlos	37	0	26+2	0	2	0	7	0
6	DF	(Brazil) BRA	Aldair	37	0	27	0	3	0	7	0
5	DF	(France) FRA	Candela	42	1	29+1	1	4	0	8	0
17	MF	(Italy) ITA	Tommasi	44	1	29+4	1	3	0	8	0
4	MF	(Italy) ITA	Di Biagio	35	5	24+3	4	1	0	7	1
11	MF	(Italy) ITA	Di Francesco	44	8	32+1	8	4	0	7	0
10	FW	(Italy) ITA	Totti	42	16	30+1	12	3	1	8	3
7	FW	(Brazil) BRA	Paulo Sérgio	38	12	27+3	12	2	0	6	0
24	FW	(Italy) ITA	Delvecchio	42	23	30+1	18	3	1	8	4
1	GK	(Austria) AUT	Konsel	11	-17	11	-17	0	-0	0	-0
13	DF	(Italy) ITA	Petruzzi	19	0	13	0	4	0	2	0
8	MF	(Russia) RUS	Alenichev	30	3	11+10	1	3	1	6	1
14	FW	(Italy) ITA	Gautieri	29	8	10+14	6	4	2	1	0
19	DF	(Italy) ITA	Quadrini	12	1	9+3	0	0	1	0	0
15	DF	(Cameroon) CMR	Wome	17	0	6+2	0	4	0	5	0
20	FW	(Italy) ITA	Dal Moro	7	0	5	0	1	0	1	0
16	MF	(Federal Republic of Yugoslavia) YUG	Tomic	17	0	4+5	0	3	0	5	0
27	FW	(Brazil) BRA	Fábio Júnior	9	3	4+3	3	0	0	2	0
23	MF	(Italy) ITA	Conti	4	1	2+2	1	0	0	0	0
9	FW	(Argentina) ARG	Bartelt	19	1	1+11	0	4	1	3	0
18	FW	(Italy) ITA	Frau	11	0	0+7	0	2	0	2	0
22	GK	(Italy) ITA	Campagnolo	0	0	0	0				
26	DF	(Italy) ITA	Ferri	0	0	0	0				
25	MF	(Italy) ITA	De Vezze	0	0	0	0				
28	DF	(Italy) ITA	Lanzaro	0	0	0	0				

- Source: http://calcio-seriea.net/presenze/1998/1156/

=== Goalscorers ===
- (Italy) Marco Delvecchio 18
- (Italy) Francesco Totti 12 (3)
- (Brazil) Paulo Sérgio 12
- (Italy) Eusebio Di Francesco 8
- (Italy) Carmine Gautieri 6
