= 2000–01 AS Roma season =

Roma
2000–01 season
- President: Franco Sensi
- Manager: Fabio Capello
- Stadium: Stadio Olimpico
- Serie A: 1st
- Coppa Italia: Round of 16
- UEFA Cup: Fourth round
- Top goalscorer: League: Gabriel Batistuta (20); All: Gabriel Batistuta (21)
- Highest home attendance: 77,120 vs Lazio (29 April 2001, Serie A)
- Lowest home attendance: 5,000 vs HIT Gorica (28 September 2000, UEFA Cup)
- Average home league attendance: 64,271
Home colours	Away colours	Third colours

During the 2000-01 season AS Roma competed in Serie A, Coppa Italia and UEFA Cup.

== Summary ==
In 2001, Associazione Sportiva Roma took its third league title (after 1942 and 1983), winning Serie A only a year after local rivals Lazio. Important signings for the season were Argentines Walter Samuel, a defender, and Gabriel Batistuta, a top striker. Manager Fabio Capello's line-up also included Cafu, Vincent Candela, Emerson, Vincenzo Montella and captain Francesco Totti.

Capello won Serie A once again when on the last matchday Roma defeated Parma 3–1 at home with Totti, Montella and Batistuta scoring.

== Players ==
=== Squad information ===
No.	Name	Nat	Position(s)	Date of birth (age)	Signed from
Goalkeepers
1	Francesco Antonioli	(Italy)	GK	14 September 1969 (aged 31)	(Italy) Bologna
12	Marco Amelia	(Italy)	GK	2 April 1982 (aged 19)	(Italy) Youth Sector
22	Cristiano Lupatelli	(Italy)	GK	21 June 1978 (aged 22)	(Italy) Fidelis Andria
Defenders
2	Cafu	(Brazil)	RB	7 June 1970 (aged 30)	(Brazil) Palmeiras
3	Zago	(Brazil)	CB	14 March 1969 (aged 32)	(Brazil) Corinthians
6	Aldair	(Brazil)	CB	30 November 1965 (aged 35)	(Portugal) Benfica
15	Jonathan Zebina	(France)	RB/CB	19 July 1978 (aged 22)	(Italy) Cagliari
19	Walter Samuel	(Argentina)	CB	23 March 1978 (aged 23)	(Argentina) Boca Juniors
23	Alessandro Rinaldi	(Italy)	CB	23 November 1974 (aged 26)	(Italy) Bologna
28	Amedeo Mangone	(Italy)	CB	12 July 1968 (aged 32)	(Italy) Bologna
32	Vincent Candela	(France)	LB	24 October 1973 (aged 27)	(France) Guingamp
Midfielders
4	Cristiano Zanetti	(Italy)	DM	14 April 1977 (aged 24)	(Italy) Cagliari
5	Marcos Assunção	(Brazil)	CM	25 July 1976 (aged 24)	(Brazil) Santos
7	Eusebio Di Francesco	(Italy)	CM	8 September 1969 (aged 31)	(Italy) Piacenza
8	Hidetoshi Nakata	(Japan)	CM	22 January 1977 (aged 24)	(Italy) Perugia
11	Emerson	(Brazil)	DM	4 October 1976 (aged 24)	(Germany) Bayer Leverkusen
16	Gaetano D'Agostino	(Italy)	CM	3 June 1982 (aged 18)	(Italy) Youth Sector
17	Damiano Tommasi	(Italy)	DM	17 May 1974 (aged 27)	(Italy) Hellas Verona
25	Gianni Guigou	(Uruguay)	LM	22 February 1975 (aged 26)	(Uruguay) Nacional
Forwards
9	Vincenzo Montella	(Italy)	CF	18 June 1974 (aged 27)	(Italy) Sampdoria
10	Francesco Totti (c)	(Italy)	FW	27 September 1976 (aged 24)	(Italy) Youth Sector
18	Gabriel Batistuta	(Argentina)	CF	1 February 1969 (aged 32)	(Italy) Fiorentina
21	Abel Balbo	(Argentina)	CF	1 June 1966 (aged 34)	(Italy) Fiorentina
24	Marco Delvecchio	(Italy)	CF	7 April 1973 (aged 28)	(Italy) Inter Milan

=== Reserve squad ===
No.	Name	Nat	Position(s)	Date of birth (age)
33	Carlo Zotti	(Italy)	GK	3 September 1982 (aged 18)
20	Damiano Ferronetti	(Italy)	LB	1 November 1984 (aged 16)
27	Alessandro Zamperini	(Italy)	CB	15 August 1982 (aged 18)
30	Cesare Bovo	(Italy)	CB	14 January 1983 (aged 18)
13	Massimo Bonanni	(Italy)	CM	10 June 1982 (aged 18)
26	Daniele De Rossi	(Italy)	DM	24 July 1983 (aged 17)
29	Alessandro Tulli	(Italy)	CF	10 June 1982 (aged 18)

== Transfers ==
=== In ===
Squad No.	Name	Age	Position	Transfer window	From	Type	Fee
18	(Argentina) Gabriel Batistuta	31	CF	Summer	Fiorentina	Transfer	€36.15m
19	(Argentina) Walter Samuel	22	CB	Summer	(Argentina) Boca Juniors	Transfer	€20.8m
15	(France) Jonathan Zebina	21	RB/CB	Summer	Cagliari	Transfer	€18.4m
11	(Brazil) Emerson	24	DM	Summer	(Germany) Bayer Leverkusen	Transfer	€18m
25	(Uruguay) Gianni Guigou	25	LM	Winter	(Uruguay) Nacional	Transfer	€4m
—	(Italy) Franco Brienza	21	AM	Summer	Foggia	Transfer	€52,000
33	(Italy) Giuseppe Di Masi	18	GK	Summer	Foggia	Transfer	—
21	(Argentina) Abel Balbo	34	CF	Summer	Fiorentina	Transfer	—
16	(Italy) Gaetano D'Agostino	18	CM	Summer	Youth Sector	Promotion	—
12	(Italy) Marco Amelia	18	GK	Summer	Youth Sector	Promotion	—
—	(Italy) Simone Farina	18	LB	Summer	Youth Sector	Promotion	—
8	(Russia) Dmitri Alenichev	27	CM	Summer	Perugia	Loan return	—
—	(Italy) Daniele De Vezze	20	CM	Winter	Palermo	Loan return	—
—	(Italy) Filippo Dal Moro	29	LB	Summer	(Greece) AEK Athens	Loan return	—
—	(Italy) Giuseppe Colucci	19	CM	Summer	(France) Bordeaux	Loan return	—
—	(Italy) Daniele De Vezze	20	CM	Summer	Palermo	Loan return	—
18	(Italy) Alessandro Frau	23	AM	Summer	Savoia	Loan return	—
27	(Brazil) Fábio Júnior	23	CF	Winter	(Brazil) Cruzeiro	Loan return	—

Total spending: ▼97,402,000€

=== Out ===
Squad No.	Name	Age	Position	Transfer window	To	Type	Fee
33	(Italy) Giuseppe Di Masi	18	GK	Winter	Palermo	Loan	—
28	(Italy) Maurizio Lanzaro	18	CB	Winter	Hellas Verona	Loan	—
19	(Belarus) Sergei Gurenko	28	CB	Winter	(Spain) Zaragoza	Loan	€360,000
26	(Guinea-Bissau) Ednilson	17	DM	Summer	(Portugal) Benfica	Transfer	—
25	(Italy) Andrea Campagnolo	21	GK	Summer	Genoa	Transfer	—
7	(Italy) Gustavo Bartelt	25	CF	Summer	(England) Aston Villa	Transfer	—
16	(Federal Republic of Yugoslavia) Ivan Tomić	25	CM	Summer	(Spain) Alavés	Transfer	—
13	(Italy) Manuele Blasi	19	LM	Summer	Perugia	Transfer	—
20	(Italy) Paolo Poggi	29	CF	Winter	Bari	Loan	—
13	(Italy) Manuele Blasi	19	LM	Summer	Perugia	Transfer	—
30	(Italy) Fabio Petruzzi	29	CB	Summer	Brescia	Transfer	—
27	(Brazil) Fábio Júnior	23	CF	Summer	(Brazil) Cruzeiro	Loan	—
8	(Russia) Dmitri Alenichev	27	CM	Summer	Porto	Transfer	€3m
—	(Italy) Filippo Dal Moro	29	LB	Summer	Ravenna	Loan	—
32	(Italy) Giuseppe Colucci	19	CM	Summer	Hellas Verona	Transfer	—
18	(Italy) Alessandro Frau	23	AM	Summer	Pisa	Loan	—
27	(Brazil) Fábio Júnior	23	CF	Winter	(Brazil) Palmeiras	Loan	—

Total income: ▲3,360,000€

== Competitions ==
=== Overall ===
Competition	Started round	Final position	First match	Last match
Serie A	Matchday 1	Winners	1 October 2000	17 June 2001
Coppa Italia	Round of 16	Round of 16	17 September 2000	22 September 2000
UEFA Cup	First round	Fourth round	14 September 2000	22 February 2001

Last updated: 17 June 2001

=== Serie A ===
==== League table ====
Pos	Team	Pld	W	D	L	GF	GA	GD	Pts	Qualification or relegation
1	Roma (C)	34	22	9	3	68	33	+35	75	Qualification to Champions League first group stage
2	Juventus	34	21	10	3	61	27	+34	73	Qualification to Champions League first group stage
3	Lazio	34	21	6	7	65	36	+29	69	Qualification to Champions League third qualifying round
4	Parma	34	16	8	10	51	31	+20	56	Qualification to Champions League third qualifying round
5	Internazionale	34	14	9	11	47	47	0	51	Qualification to UEFA Cup first round

Source: 2000–01 Serie A, Soccerway, RSSSF.com
Rules for classification: 1) Points; 2) Head-to-head points; 3) Head-to-head goal difference; 4) Goal difference; 5) Goals scored; 6) Draw. (Note: Head-to-head record is used only after all the matches between the teams in question have been played).
(C) Champions

==== Results summary ====
Overall								Home						Away					
Pld	W	D	L	GF	GA	GD	Pts	W	D	L	GF	GA	GD	W	D	L	GF	GA	GD
34	22	9	3	68	33	+35	75	12	5	0	33	14	+19	10	4	3	35	19	+16

Last updated: 17 June 2001.
Source: Competitive matches

==== Results by round ====
Round	1	2	3	4	5	6	7	8	9	10	11	12	13	14	15	16	17	18	19	20	21	22	23	24	25	26	27	28	29	30	31	32	33	34
Ground	H	A	H	A	A	H	A	H	A	H	A	H	A	H	A	H	A	A	H	A	H	H	A	H	A	H	A	H	A	H	A	H	A	H
Result	W	W	W	L	W	W	W	W	D	W	W	D	W	D	L	W	W	W	W	W	W	W	D	W	L	D	W	D	D	W	W	D	D	W
Position	1	1	1	3	2	1	1	1	1	1	1	1	1	1	1	1	1	1	1	1	1	1	1	1	1	1	1	1	1	1	1	1	1	1

Source: Competitive matches
A = Away; H = Home; W = Win; D = Draw; L = Loss; P = Postponed; = Leader, 2001–02 UEFA Champions League Group stage; = 2001–02 UEFA Champions League Group stage; = 2001–02 UEFA Champions League Qualifying round; = 2001–02 UEFA Cup First round; = Qualification to Intertoto Cup; = 2001–02 Serie B

==== Matches ====
1 October 2000 1	Roma	2–0	Bologna	Rome
15:00 CEST (UTC+02:00)	Totti 45+2'; Castellini 62' (o.g.)	Report		Stadium: Stadio Olimpico; Attendance: 59,769; Referee: Stefano Farina

15 October 2000 2	Lecce	0–4	Roma	Lecce
20:30 CEST (UTC+02:00)		Report	Batistuta 41', 80'; Tommasi 47'; Totti 90+1' (pen.)	Stadium: Stadio Via del Mare; Attendance: 18,332; Referee: Cosimo Bolognino

22 October 2000 3	Roma	3–1	Vicenza	Rome
15:00 CEST (UTC+02:00)	Totti 39'; Montella 79'; Batistuta 86'	Report	Kallon 85'	Stadium: Stadio Olimpico; Attendance: 57,610; Referee: Fiorenzo Treossi

1 November 2000 4	Internazionale	2–0	Roma	Milan
20:30 CET (UTC+01:00)	Şükür 19'; Recoba 68'	Report		Stadium: San Siro; Attendance: 70,121; Referee: Domenico Messina

5 November 2000 5	Brescia	2–4	Roma	Brescia
15:00 CET (UTC+01:00)	Bisoli 22'; Hübner 45' (pen.)	Report	Candela 13'; Batistuta 60', 78', 90+1'	Stadium: Stadio Mario Rigamonti; Attendance: 16,619; Referee: Salvatore Racalbuto

12 November 2000 6	Roma	2–1	Reggina	Rome
15:00 CET (UTC+01:00)	Totti 30' (pen.); Montella 71'	Report	Bogdani 55'	Stadium: Stadio Olimpico; Attendance: 60,740; Referee: Pierluigi Collina

19 November 2000 7	Hellas Verona	1–4	Roma	Verona
15:00 CET (UTC+01:00)	Oddo 4' (pen.)	Report	Candela 38'; Totti 45'; Batistuta 58', 90'	Stadium: Stadio Marc'Antonio Bentegodi; Attendance: 20,053; Referee: Fiorenzo Treossi

26 November 2000 8	Roma	1–0	Fiorentina	Rome
20:30 CET (UTC+01:00)	Batistuta 83'	Report		Stadium: Stadio Olimpico; Attendance: 65,787; Referee: Graziano Cesari

3 December 2000 9	Perugia	0–0	Roma	Perugia
15:00 CET (UTC+01:00)		Report		Stadium: Stadio Renato Curi; Attendance: 27,559; Referee: Gennaro Borriello

10 December 2000 10	Roma	2–1	Udinese	Rome
15:00 CET (UTC+01:00)	Batistuta 20'; Totti 34'	Report	Muzzi 44'	Stadium: Stadio Olimpico; Attendance: 59,223; Referee: Danilo Nucini

17 December 2000 11	Lazio	0–1	Roma	Rome
20:30 CET (UTC+01:00)		Report	Negro 70' (o.g.)	Stadium: Stadio Olimpico; Attendance: 73,988; Referee: Graziano Cesari

22 December 2000 12	Roma	0–0	Juventus	Rome
20:30 CET (UTC+01:00)		Report		Stadium: Stadio Olimpico; Attendance: 73,411; Referee: Gennaro Borriello

7 January 2001 13	Atalanta	0–2	Roma	Bergamo
15:00 CET (UTC+01:00)		Report	Delvecchio 1'; Tommasi 41'	Stadium: Stadio Atleti Azzurri d'Italia; Attendance: 20,716; Referee: Roberto Rosetti

14 January 2001 14	Roma	1–1	Bari	Rome
15:00 CET (UTC+01:00)	Totti 76' (pen.)	Report	Mazzarelli 69'	Stadium: Stadio Olimpico; Attendance: 59,175; Referee: Cosimo Bolognino

21 January 2001 15	Milan	3–2	Roma	Milan
20:30 CET (UTC+01:00)	Leonardo 3'; Shevchenko 22', 44'	Report	Totti 40', 86' (pen.)	Stadium: San Siro; Attendance: 61,786; Referee: Roberto Rosetti

28 January 2001 16	Roma	3–0	Napoli	Rome
15:00 CET (UTC+01:00)	Delvecchio 18'; Totti 40'; Batistuta 84'	Report		Stadium: Stadio Olimpico; Attendance: 61,141; Referee: Alfredo Trentalange

4 February 2001 17	Parma	1–2	Roma	Parma
15:00 CET (UTC+01:00)	Di Vaio 36'	Report	Batistuta 74', 83'	Stadium: Stadio Ennio Tardini; Attendance: 26,499; Referee: Stefano Farina

11 February 2001 18	Bologna	1–2	Roma	Bologna
15:00 CET (UTC+01:00)	Brioschi 51'	Report	Batistuta 11' (pen.); Emerson 35'	Stadium: Stadio Renato Dall'Ara; Attendance: 33,823; Referee: Salvatore Racalbuto

18 February 2001 19	Roma	1–0	Lecce	Rome
15:00 CET (UTC+01:00)	Samuel 68'	Report		Stadium: Stadio Olimpico; Attendance: 58,275; Referee: Domenico Messina

25 February 2001 20	Vicenza	0–2	Roma	Udine
15:00 CET (UTC+01:00)		Report	Montella 80'; Emerson 84'	Stadium: Stadio Friuli; Attendance: 12,000; Referee: Graziano Cesari

4 March 2001 21	Roma	3–2	Internazionale	Rome
20:30 CET (UTC+01:00)	Assunção 10'; Montella 28', 86'	Report	Vieri 9', 45+1'	Stadium: Stadio Olimpico; Attendance: 66,212; Referee: Pierluigi Collina

11 March 2001 22	Roma	3–1	Brescia	Rome
15:00 CET (UTC+01:00)	Assunção 21'; Montella 69', 89'	Report	Yllana 30'	Stadium: Stadio Olimpico; Attendance: 60,586; Referee: Cosimo Bolognino

18 March 2001 23	Reggina	0–0	Roma	Reggio Calabria
20:30 CET (UTC+01:00)		Report		Stadium: Stadio Oreste Granillo; Attendance: 25,072; Referee: Alfredo Trentalange

1 April 2001 24	Roma	3–1	Hellas Verona	Rome
15:00 CEST (UTC+02:00)	Apolloni 55' (o.g.); Batistuta 60'; Montella 71'	Report	Camoranesi 27'	Stadium: Stadio Olimpico; Attendance: 62,235; Referee: Stefano Braschi

9 April 2001 25	Fiorentina	3–1	Roma	Florence
15:00 CEST (UTC+02:00)	Chiesa 12', 82'; Candela 57' (o.g.)	Report	Emerson 30'	Stadium: Stadio Artemio Franchi; Attendance: 34,140; Referee: Stefano Farina

14 April 2001 26	Roma	2–2	Perugia	Rome
15:00 CEST (UTC+02:00)	Totti 53'; Tedesco 90' (o.g.)	Report	Baiocco 44'; Saudati 78'	Stadium: Stadio Olimpico; Attendance: 61,128; Referee: Cosimo Bolognino

22 April 2001 27	Udinese	1–3	Roma	Udine
15:00 CEST (UTC+02:00)	Sosa 78'	Report	39' Montella; 45+1' Tommasi; 67' Nakata; 88' Emerson	Stadium: Stadio Friuli; Attendance: 22,694; Referee: Stefano Farina

29 April 2001 28	Roma	2–2	Lazio	Rome
20:30 CEST (UTC+02:00)	Batistuta 48'; Delvecchio 54'	Report	Nedvěd 78'; Castromán 90+5'	Stadium: Stadio Olimpico; Attendance: 77,120; Referee: Stefano Braschi

6 May 2001 29	Juventus	2–2	Roma	Turin
20:30 CEST (UTC+02:00)	Del Piero 4'; Zidane 6'	Report	Nakata 79'; Montella 90+1'	Stadium: Stadio delle Alpi; Attendance: 63,548; Referee: Stefano Braschi

12 May 2001 30	Roma	1–0	Atalanta	Rome
15:00 CEST (UTC+02:00)	Aldair 46'; Montella 63'	Report		Stadium: Stadio Olimpico; Attendance: 64,013; Referee: Fiorenzo Treossi

20 May 2001 31	Bari	1–4	Roma	Bari
15:00 CEST (UTC+02:00)	Spinesi 90'	Report	Candela 29'; Batistuta 43', 88'; Cafu 70'	Stadium: Stadio San Nicola; Attendance: 33,906; Referee: Stefano Farina

27 May 2001 32	Roma	1–1	Milan	Rome
20:30 CEST (UTC+02:00)	Montella 64'	Report	Coco 45+1'	Stadium: Stadio Olimpico; Attendance: 71,407; Referee: Graziano Cesari

10 June 2001 33	Napoli	2–2	Roma	Naples
15:00 CEST (UTC+02:00)	Amoruso 37'; Pecchia 81'	Report	Batistuta 42'; Totti 52'	Stadium: Stadio San Paolo; Attendance: 52,734; Referee: Fiorenzo Treossi

17 June 2001 34	Roma	3–1	Parma	Rome
15:00 CEST (UTC+02:00)	Totti 19'; Montella 39'; Batistuta 78'	Report	Di Vaio 82'	Stadium: Stadio Olimpico; Attendance: 74,773; Referee: Stefano Braschi

=== Coppa Italia ===
==== Round of 16 ====
17 September 2000 First leg	Roma	1–1	Atalanta	Rome
20:30 CEST (UTC+02:00)	Montella 24'		Bellini 49'	Stadium: Stadio Olimpico; Attendance: 21,671; Referee: Emilio Pellegrino

22 September 2000 Second leg	Atalanta	4–2 (5–3 agg.)	Roma	Bergamo
20:30 CEST (UTC+02:00)	Ganz 9', 56'; Bellini 63'; Pinardi 90+3'		Montella 20'; Totti 90+1' (pen.)	Stadium: Stadio Atleti Azzurri d'Italia; Attendance: 10,891; Referee: Pierluigi Collina

=== UEFA Cup ===
==== First round ====
14 September 2000 First leg	HIT Gorica (Slovenia)	1–4	(Italy) Roma	Nova Gorica, Slovenia
15:45 CEST (UTC+02:00)	Žlogar 29'; Pitamič (yellow card) 34'; Srebrnič (yellow card) 44'	Report	Delvecchio 17', 19', 49'; Zebina (yellow card) 23'; Samuel 41'; Mangone (yellow card) 60'; Aldair (yellow card) 88'	Stadium: Nova Gorica Sports Park; Attendance: 2,200; Referee: Constantin Zotta (Romania)

28 September 2000 Second leg	Roma (Italy)	7–0 (11–1 agg.)	(Slovenia) HIT Gorica	Rome, Italy
18:30 CEST (UTC+02:00)	Samuel 8'; Montella 11', 19'; Delvecchio 23'; Totti 41', 47'; Batistuta 66'	Report	Šculac (yellow card) 19'	Stadium: Stadio Olimpico; Attendance: 5,000; Referee: Wolfgang Stark (Germany)

==== Second round ====
26 October 2000 First leg	Boavista (Portugal)	0–1	(Italy) Roma	Porto, Portugal
22:30 CEST (UTC+02:00)	Rogério (red card) 43'; Duda (yellow card) 68'	Report	Guigou (yellow card) 13'; Zago (yellow card) 65'; Montella 73'; Rinaldi (yellow card) 80'	Stadium: Estádio do Bessa; Attendance: 6,000; Referee: Frank De Bleeckere (Belgium)

9 November 2000 Second leg	Roma (Italy)	1–1 (2–1 agg.)	(Portugal) Boavista	Rome, Italy
18:15 CET (UTC+01:00)	Nakata 8'; Tommasi (yellow card) 43'; Batistuta (yellow card) 56'; Mangone (yellow card) 76'	Report	Duda 54'; Pedro Jorge (yellow card) 57'; Couto (yellow card) 87'; Martelinho (yellow card) 90'	Stadium: Stadio Olimpico; Attendance: 10,831; Referee: Éric Poulat (France)

==== Third round ====
23 November 2000 First leg	Roma (Italy)	1–0	(Germany) Hamburg	Rome, Italy
20:45 CET (UTC+01:00)	Guigou 32'; Zanetti (yellow card) 90'	Report	Präger (yellow card) 44'; Mahmut Yılmaz (yellow card) 82'	Stadium: Stadio Olimpico; Attendance: 42,705; Referee: Alain Hamer (Luxembourg)

7 December 2000 Second leg	Hamburg (Germany)	0–3 (0–4 agg.)	(Italy) Roma	Hamburg, Germany
20:00 CET (UTC+01:00)	Präger (yellow card) 45'	Report	Cafu (yellow card) 11'; Aldair 28'; Tommasi (yellow card) 37'; Delvecchio 58'; Samuel 60'	Stadium: HSH Nordbank Arena; Attendance: 48,500; Referee: Jan Wegereef (Netherlands)

==== Eightfinals ====
15 February 2001 First leg	Roma (Italy)	0–2	(England) Liverpool	Rome, Italy
21:00 CET (UTC+01:00)	Mangone (yellow card) 79'	Report	Owen 46', 72'	Stadium: Stadio Olimpico; Attendance: 59,718; Referee: Markus Merk (Germany)

22 February 2001 Second leg	Liverpool (England)	0–1 (2–1 agg.)	(Italy) Roma	Liverpool, England
21:05 CET (UTC+01:00)		Report	Montella (yellow card) 4'; Assunção (yellow card) 29'; Zebina (yellow card) 36'; Guigou 69', (yellow card) 90' (yellow-red card); Samuel (yellow card) 77'; Tommasi (yellow card) 84' (yellow-red card)	Stadium: Anfield; Attendance: 43,688; Referee: José María García-Aranda (Spain)

== Statistics ==
=== Appearances and goals ===
No.	Pos	Nat	Player	Total		Serie A		UEFA Cup	
No.	Pos	Nat	Player	Apps	Goals	Apps	Goals	Apps	Goals
1	GK	(Italy) ITA	Antonioli	32	-32	26	-28	6	-4
2	DF	(Brazil) BRA	Cafu	38	1	31	1	7	0
15	DF	(France) FRA	Zebina	26	0	21+1	0	4	0
3	DF	(Brazil) BRA	Zago	31	0	28	0	3	0
19	DF	(Argentina) ARG	Samuel	39	4	31	1	8	3
32	DF	(France) FRA	Candela	38	3	33	3	5	0
17	MF	(Italy) ITA	Tommasi	42	3	31+3	3	7+1	0
4	MF	(Italy) ITA	Zanetti	30	0	20+7	0	0+3	0
10	MF	(Italy) ITA	Totti (c)	33	15	30	13	2+1	2
18	FW	(Argentina) ARG	Batistuta	32	21	28	20	1+3	1
24	FW	(Italy) ITA	Delvecchio	39	8	28+3	3	7+1	5
22	GK	(Italy) ITA	Lupatelli	10	-5	8	-5	2	0
6	DF	(Brazil) BRA	Aldair	18	1	14+1	0	2+1	1
9	FW	(Italy) ITA	Montella	36	16	12+16	13	8	3
11	MF	(Brazil) BRA	Emerson	14	3	10+3	3	1	0
5	MF	(Brazil) BRA	Assunção	17	2	6+6	2	4+1	0
8	MF	(Japan) JPN	Nakata	22	3	5+10	2	5+2	1
28	DF	(Italy) ITA	Mangone	16	0	5+6	0	5	0
25	MF	(Uruguay) URU	Guigou	22	2	3+12	0	5+2	2
23	DF	(Italy) ITA	Rinaldi	13	0	3+6	0	4	0
7	MF	(Italy) ITA	Di Francesco	6	0	1+4	0	1	0
21	FW	(Argentina) ARG	Balbo	5	0	0+2	0	0+3	0
16	FW	(Italy) ITA	D'Agostino	3	0	0+1	0	1+1	0
14	DF	(Belarus) BLR	Gurenko	1	0	0	0	0+1	0
13	DF	(Italy) ITA	Lanzaro	1	0	0	0	0+1	0
20	FW	(Italy) ITA	Poggi	0	0	0	0		
30	DF	(Italy) ITA	Bovo	0	0	0	0		
13	MF	(Italy) ITA	Bonanni	0	0	0	0		
26	MF	(Italy) ITA	De Rossi	0	0	0	0		
12	GK	(Italy) ITA	Amelia	0	0	0	0		

- Source: http://calcio-seriea.net/presenze/2000/1192/

=== Goalscorers ===
Rank	No.	Pos	Nat	Name	Serie A	Coppa Italia	UEFA Cup	Total
1	18	FW	(Argentina)	Gabriel Batistuta	20	0	1	21
2	9	FW	(Italy)	Vincenzo Montella	13	2	3	18
3	10	FW	(Italy)	Francesco Totti	13	1	2	16
4	24	FW	(Italy)	Marco Delvecchio	3	0	5	8
5	19	DF	(Argentina)	Walter Samuel	1	0	3	4
6	8	MF	(Japan)	Hidetoshi Nakata	2	0	1	3
6	11	MF	(Brazil)	Emerson	3	0	0	3
6	17	MF	(Italy)	Damiano Tommasi	3	0	0	3
6	32	DF	(France)	Vincent Candela	3	0	0	3
10	5	MF	(Brazil)	Marcos Assunção	2	0	0	2
10	25	MF	(Uruguay)	Gianni Guigou	0	0	2	2
12	2	DF	(Brazil)	Cafu	1	0	0	1
12	6	DF	(Brazil)	Aldair	0	0	1	1
Own goal					4	0	0	4
Totals					68	3	18	89

Last updated: 17 June 2001

=== Clean sheets ===
Rank	No.	Pos	Nat	Name	Serie A	Coppa Italia	UEFA Cup	Total
1	1	GK	(Italy)	Francesco Antonioli	7	0	3	10
2	22	GK	(Italy)	Cristiano Lupatelli	5	0	2	7
Totals					12	0	5	17

Last updated: 17 June 2001
