= Antônio Carlos Zago =

Brazilian footballer and manager (born 1969)

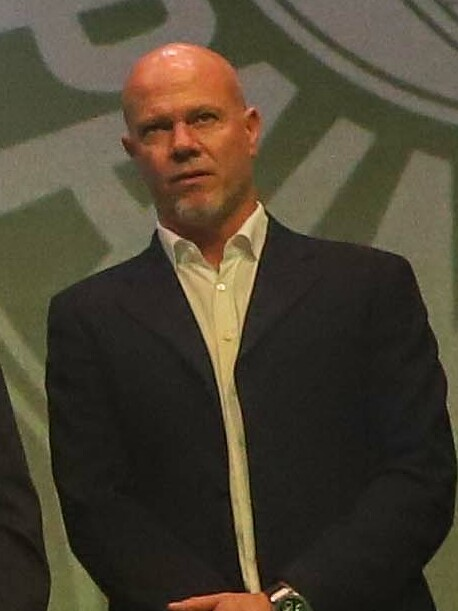
- Zago in 2018

Personal information
- Full name: Antônio Carlos Zago
- Date of birth: 18 May 1969 (age 57)
- Place of birth: Presidente Prudente, Brazil
- Height: 1.84 m (6 ft 0 in)
- Position: Centre back

Team information
- Current team: The Strongest (manager)

Youth career
- Corinthians-PP
- 1983–1986: Ubiratan
- 1988–1989: São Paulo

Senior career*
Years	Team	Apps	(Gls)
1986–1988	Ubiratan		
1990–1992	São Paulo	111	(8)
1992	Albacete	12	(1)
1993–1995	Palmeiras	145	(8)
1996–1997	Kashiwa Reysol	24	(0)
1997	Corinthians	21	(2)
1998–2002	Roma	107	(2)
2002–2004	Beşiktaş	56	(2)
2004–2005	Santos	8	(0)
2005–2007	Juventude	53	(3)
2007	Santos	15	(1)
Total		552	(27)

International career
1991–2001	Brazil	37	(3)

Managerial career
- 2009–2010: São Caetano
- 2010: Palmeiras
- 2010: Grêmio Prudente
- 2011: Mogi Mirim
- 2011: Vila Nova
- 2012: Audax São Paulo
- 2013: Roma (assistant)
- 2013–2015: Shakhtar Donetsk (assistant)
- 2015–2016: Juventude
- 2017: Internacional
- 2017: Fortaleza
- 2017–2018: Juventude
- 2018–2019: Red Bull Brasil
- 2019: Bragantino
- 2020–2021: Kashima Antlers
- 2021–2022: Bolívar
- 2023: Coritiba
- 2023–2024: Bolivia
- 2025: The Strongest
- 2025: Botafogo-PB
- 2026–: The Strongest
- * Club domestic league appearances and goals

Antônio Carlos Zago (born 18 May 1969), sometimes known as just Antônio Carlos or simply Zago, is a Brazilian professional football coach and former player who played as a centre back. He is the current manager of Bolivian club The Strongest.

== Club career ==
=== Early career ===
Born in Presidente Prudente, São Paulo, also having Italian origins, Zago moved to Dourados, Mato Grosso do Sul as a teenager, and began his senior career with local side Ubiratan, as a forward and being known as Tonhão. In 1988, after finishing the Campeonato Sul-Mato-Grossense as a starter as Ubiratan finished in the second position, he agreed to join São Paulo, with five players moving in the opposite direction.

=== São Paulo ===
Upon arriving at São Paulo, Zago was known as Antônio Carlos, and was pushed back to midfielder by manager Cilinho. He was later moved further back to a libero by the reserves manager Pupo Gimenez, and made his first team debut on 25 April 1990 by starting in a 2–0 Campeonato Paulista away win over Portuguesa.

After the arrival of Telê Santana as manager, Zago established himself as a regular starter, winning two Campeonato Paulistas (1991 and 1992), aside from lifting the 1991 Série A and the 1992 Copa Libertadores.

=== Albacete ===
In July 1992, Zago was transferred to La Liga side Albacete for a fee of US$ 1.650 million. However, after failing to adapt to a new country, he opted to leave in December.

=== Palmeiras ===
In December 1992, Zago was presented at Palmeiras, along with Roberto Carlos. A first-choice option, he won two consecutive Série A and two consecutive Campeonato Paulista titles with Verdão, both in 1993 and 1994.

=== Kashiwa Reysol ===
On 7 December 1995, Palmeiras agreed the transfer of Zago and teammate Edílson to Japanese club Kashiwa Reysol, for a combined fee of R$ 5 million. He was a regular starter during the 1996 season, but opted to leave for personal reasons.

=== Corinthians ===
In April 1997, Zago returned to his home country after signing for Corinthians, for a fee of US$3.3 million. In August, he assaulted an Atlético Paranaense doctor, being later suspended for 40 days in September.

=== Roma ===
In January 1998, Zago moved to the Italian capital to join Roma for a fee of US$4 million, at the request of the club's manager Zdenek Zeman, who was looking to reinforce the team's defensive line. In his Serie A debut with the club, on 11 February 1998 at Lecce, he was sent off after only a few minutes of play; his performances with the giallorossi soon improved, however, and he was able to demonstrate his quality and skill, leading to him being recalled to the Brazilian national side in 1999. Zago played for five seasons with Roma, and was also part of the 2001 Scudetto-winning team; Zago partnered with compatriot Aldair and Argentine Walter Samuel to form a sold back-line, which aided Roma in claiming the Serie A title. Due to his success and performances with Roma, Zago still remains a popular figure with the romanista fans, who nicknamed him Terminator during his time at the club.

In November 1999, Zago was the protagonist of a shocking episode, when he spat on Lazio player Diego Simeone's face during a derby match. The outcome was a positive attitude towards him by the fans, who paid tribute to his action in the song "Brusco", the phrases "Zago: spits fire as a dragon" and "people can only keep their mouth shut, otherwise AC Zago will spit at them". Zago is also one of the few Brazilian players who is known with his name and surname. During the years he spent to Rome he had chosen his name on the shirt to be written in different ways, the first "ANTÔNIO CARLOS", then "AC ZAGO" then simply "ZAGO."

=== Beşiktaş ===
In 2002, after nearly joining Bolton Wanderers, Zago left Roma. In May, he went to Turkey and signed with Beşiktaş for two years.

=== Santos ===
On 6 August 2004, Zago returned to Brazil and signed a contract with Santos. He only featured sparingly for the club, and left in March 2005 after playing just nine matches.

=== Juventude ===
On 6 April 2005, Zago joined Juventude on a deal until the end of the year. In March 2006, he was suspended for 60 days after being accused of racism in a Campeonato Gaúcho match against Grêmio.

=== Return to Santos ===
On 29 December 2006, Zago returned to Santos, reuniting with manager Vanderlei Luxemburgo. He retired in November 2007, aged 38.

== International career ==
Zago debuted with the Brazil national team on 30 October 1991, in a 3–1 win against Yugoslavia, and remained within the national squad until 1993. After a period of mixed success at club level, however, he has no longer called up to the national side; only after moving to Roma, did he manage return to the national team with his stand-out performances for the club. Between 1998 and 2001, he collected 26 caps for Brazil and scored two goals; he was also part of the squad that won the 1999 Copa América. In total, he made 37 appearances for Brazil between 1991 and 2001, scoring three goals.

== Managerial career ==
Shortly after retiring, Zago returned to Corinthians as a technical director. He resigned from the role in March 2009, after controversies regarding the signing of Ronaldo.

=== São Caetano ===
On 2 June 2009, Zago was appointed manager of São Caetano in the Série B, replacing Sérgio Soares. He missed eight matches between September and October after serving a 45-day suspension, and renewed his contract for the following season on 8 November, as his side subsequently finished seventh.

Zago's side started the 2010 Campeonato Paulista with two wins in three matches, and defeated his former side Palmeiras 4–1 at the Parque Antártica on 17 February. Two days later, he left the club after accepting an offer from Palmeiras.

=== Palmeiras ===
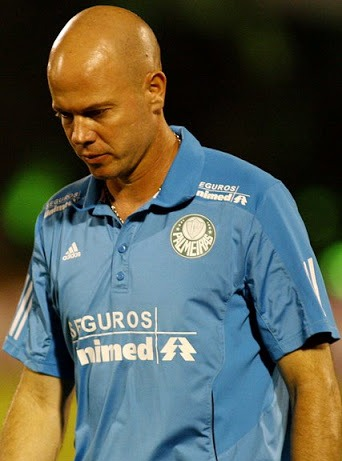
Zago as head coach of Palmeiras in 2010

On 19 February 2010, Palmeiras announced Zago as their new manager. He made his debut at the club two days later, in a 2–0 home win over another side he represented as a player, São Paulo.

However, Palmeiras ended the 2010 Paulista with five winless matches under Zago, and after an alleged fight with player Robert, he was dismissed on 18 May.

=== Local teams and assistant periods ===
After leaving Palmeiras, Zago took over fellow top tier side Grêmio Prudente on 17 August 2010. On 10 September, after only one win in six matches and with the club in the relegation zone, he was sacked.

On 3 January 2011, Zago was named manager of Mogi Mirim, but left on 9 February to manage Vila Nova. He was dismissed by the latter on 25 March, after just seven matches, and was announced as manager of Audax São Paulo on 23 November.

On 27 December 2012, Zago left Audax to return to Roma, now as an assistant coach of Zdeněk Zeman. On 16 October 2013, he was appointed by Shakhtar Donetsk as their new assistant manager, joining his former Beşiktaş coach Mircea Lucescu.

=== Juventude ===
In August 2015, Zago returned to Brazil after being named at the helm of Juventude. He finished second in the 2016 Campeonato Gaúcho with the club, knocking out Grêmio in the semi-finals, and also achieved promotion in the 2016 Série C.

On 11 December 2016, Zago announced his departure from Ju.

=== Internacional ===
On 12 December 2016, Zago was appointed as the new head coach of Internacional, replacing Lisca, who was sacked on 11 December, only hours after the team were relegated for the first time in Brazilian history. On 28 May 2017, he was dismissed.

=== Fortaleza ===
On 20 August 2017, Zago was announced the new coach of Fortaleza. He helped the side return to Série B after an eight-year absence, but announced his departure on 26 October.

=== Juventude return ===
On 26 October 2017, shortly after achieving promotion with Fortaleza, Juventude announced the return of Zago as their manager. He was sacked on 22 February, after being eliminated in the Copa do Brasil.

=== Red Bull Brasil / Bragantino ===
On 5 September 2018, Zago was appointed manager of Red Bull Brasil for the 2019 Campeonato Paulista. Ahead of the 2019 Série B, as Bragantino was bought by Red Bull, he became their manager, and led the side to promotion as champions.

=== Kashima Antlers ===
On 2 January 2020, Zago was announced as manager of Kashima Antlers. He was sacked on 14 April 2021, after a poor run of form.

=== Bolívar ===
On 14 July 2021, Zago was announced as manager of Bolívar, months after the club was announced as partner of the City Football Group. On 12 November 2022, after winning the 2022 Apertura with the club, he left.

=== Coritiba ===
On 22 April 2023, Zago returned to Brazil and its top tier, after being named in charge of Coritiba. He was sacked on 27 June, after no wins in eleven matches.

=== Bolivia national team ===
On 31 October 2023, Zago was officially announced as Bolivia national football team new head coach, replacing the sacked Gustavo Costas. The following 18 July, after a poor performance in the 2024 Copa América, he was sacked.

=== The Strongest ===
On 12 January 2025, Zago returned to Bolivia after being named manager of The Strongest.

=== Botafogo-PB ===
On 7 April 2025, Zago was announced as head coach of Botafogo-PB back in his home country. On 12 May, after just six matches, he was sacked.

=== The Strongest return ===
On 3 August 2026, after more than one year without a club, Zago returned to Bolivia and The Strongest.

== Career statistics ==
=== Club ===
Club	Season	League			State League		Cup		Continental		Other		Total	
Club	Season	Division	Apps	Goals	Apps	Goals	Apps	Goals	Apps	Goals	Apps	Goals	Apps	Goals
São Paulo	1990	Série A	21	1	13	0	6	0	—		—		40	1
São Paulo	1991	Série A	21	1	30	4	—		—		—		51	5
São Paulo	1992	Série A	23	2	3	0	—		13 (Note: Appearance(s) in Copa Libertadores)	2	—		39	4
São Paulo	Total		65	4	46	4	6	0	13	2	—		130	10
Albacete	1992–93	La Liga	12	1	—		2	0	—		—		14	1
Palmeiras	1993	Série A	18	1	34	2	3	0	—		2 (Note: Appearance(s) in Torneio Rio – São Paulo)	0	57	3
Palmeiras	1994	Série A	22	2	21	1	1	0	7	0	—		51	3
Palmeiras	1995	Série A	20	1	30	1	4	0	10	0	—		64	2
Palmeiras	Total		60	4	85	4	8	0	17	0	2	0	172	8
Kashiwa Reysol	1996	J1 League	24	0	—		2	0	—		5 (Note: Appearance(s) in J.League Cup)	0	31	0
Kashiwa Reysol	1997	J1 League	0	0	—		0	0	—		6	0	6	0
Kashiwa Reysol	Total		24	0	—		2	0	—		11	0	37	0
Corinthians	1997	Série A	12	2	9	0	0	0	—		—		21	2
Roma	1997–98	Serie A	12	0	—		—		—		—		12	0
Roma	1998–99	Serie A	28	0	—		2	0	7 (Note: Appearance(s) in UEFA Cup)	0	—		37	0
Roma	1999–2000	Serie A	27	2	—		2	0	8	0	—		37	2
Roma	2000–01	Serie A	28	0	—		1	0	3	0	—		32	0
Roma	2001–02	Serie A	12	0	—		2	0	5 (Note: Appearance(s) in UEFA Champions League)	0	1 (Note: Appearance(s) in Supercoppa Italiana)	0	20	0
Roma	Total		107	2	—		7	0	23	0	1	0	138	2
Beşiktaş	2002–03	Süper Lig	31	2	—		2	0	7	0	—		40	2
Beşiktaş	2003–04	Süper Lig	25	0	—		0	0	7 (Note: Six appearances in UEFA Champions League, one appearance in UEFA Cup)	0	—		32	0
Beşiktaş	Total		56	2	—		2	0	14	0	—		72	2
Santos	2004	Série A	7	0	—		—		1 (Note: Appearance(s) in Copa Sudamericana)	0	—		8	0
Santos	2005	Série A	0	0	1	0	—		0	0	—		1	0
Santos	Total		7	0	1	0	—		1	0	—		9	0
Juventude	2005	Série A	30	2	—		—		2	0	—		32	2
Juventude	2006	Série A	22	1	1	0	—		—		—		23	1
Juventude	Total		52	3	1	0	—		2	0	—		55	3
Santos	2007	Série A	1	0	14	1	—		7	0	—		22	1
Career total			396	18	156	9	27	0	77	2	14	0	670	29

=== International ===
Brazil national team
Year	Apps	Goals
1991	2	0
1992	3	1
1993	6	0
1994	0	0
1995	0	0
1996	0	0
1997	0	0
1998	3	0
1999	12	0
2000	10	2
2001	1	0
Total	37	3

=== Managerial statistics ===
As of 11 May 2025

Managerial record by team and tenure
Team	Nat	From	To	Record								Ref
Team	Nat	From	To	G	W	D	L	GF	GA	GD	Win %	Ref
São Caetano	(Brazil)	2 June 2009	19 February 2010	35	16	8	11	62	39	+23	45.71	
Palmeiras	(Brazil)	19 February 2010	18 May 2010	19	9	5	5	25	20	+5	47.37	
Grêmio Prudente	(Brazil)	17 August 2010	10 September 2010	6	1	2	3	5	8	−3	16.67	
Mogi Mirim	(Brazil)	3 January 2011	9 February 2011	6	2	1	3	7	9	−2	33.33	
Vila Nova	(Brazil)	9 February 2011	25 March 2011	7	4	0	3	17	12	+5	57.14	
Audax	(Brazil)	23 November 2011	27 December 2012	51	25	9	17	81	63	+18	49.02	
Juventude	(Brazil)	17 August 2015	11 December 2016	54	24	16	14	80	54	+26	44.44	
Internacional	(Brazil)	12 December 2016	28 May 2017	30	14	10	6	47	27	+20	46.67	
Fortaleza	(Brazil)	20 August 2017	26 October 2017	9	3	3	3	8	8	+0	33.33	
Juventude	(Brazil)	28 October 2017	22 February 2018	15	2	5	8	12	23	−11	13.33	
Red Bull Brasil	(Brazil)	5 September 2018	23 April 2019	31	16	11	4	45	26	+19	51.61	
Bragantino	(Brazil)	23 April 2019	24 December 2019	38	22	9	7	64	27	+37	57.89	
Kashima Antlers	(Japan)	2 January 2020	13 April 2021	48	23	7	18	78	64	+14	47.92	
Bolívar	(Bolivia)	14 July 2021	12 November 2022	77	42	12	23	162	68	+94	54.55	
Coritiba	(Brazil)	22 April 2023	27 June 2023	11	0	4	7	9	22	−13	0.00	
Bolivia	(Bolivia)	31 October 2023	18 July 2024	10	2	0	8	7	23	−16	20.00	
The Strongest	(Bolivia)	12 January 2025	7 April 2025	4	1	1	2	4	7	−3	25.00	
Botafogo-PB	(Brazil)	7 April 2025	12 May 2025	6	1	2	3	6	6	+0	16.67	
Total				457	207	106	144	719	506	+213	45.30	

== Honours ==
=== Player ===
==== Club ====
São Paulo

- Copa Libertadores: 1992
- Campeonato Brasileiro Série A: 1991
- Campeonato Paulista: 1991, 1992
- Ramón de Carranza Trophy: 1992
- Teresa Herrera Trophy: 1992

Palmeiras

- Campeonato Brasileiro Série A: 1993, 1994
- Campeonato Paulista: 1993, 1994
- Torneio Rio – São Paulo: 1993

Corinthians

- Campeonato Paulista: 1997

Roma

- Serie A: 2000–01
- Supercoppa Italiana: 2001

Beşiktaş

- Süper Lig: 2002–03

Santos

- Campeonato Brasileiro Série A: 2004
- Campeonato Paulista: 2007

==== International ====
Brazil

- Copa América: 1999

=== Manager ===
Internacional

- Recopa Gaúcha: 2017

Bragantino

- Campeonato Brasileiro Série B: 2019

Bolívar

- Bolivian Primera División: 2022 Apertura

=== Individual ===
- Campeonato Paulista Team of the Year: 2019
