= Hidetoshi Nakata =

Japanese footballer (born 1977)

Hidetoshi Nakata OSSI
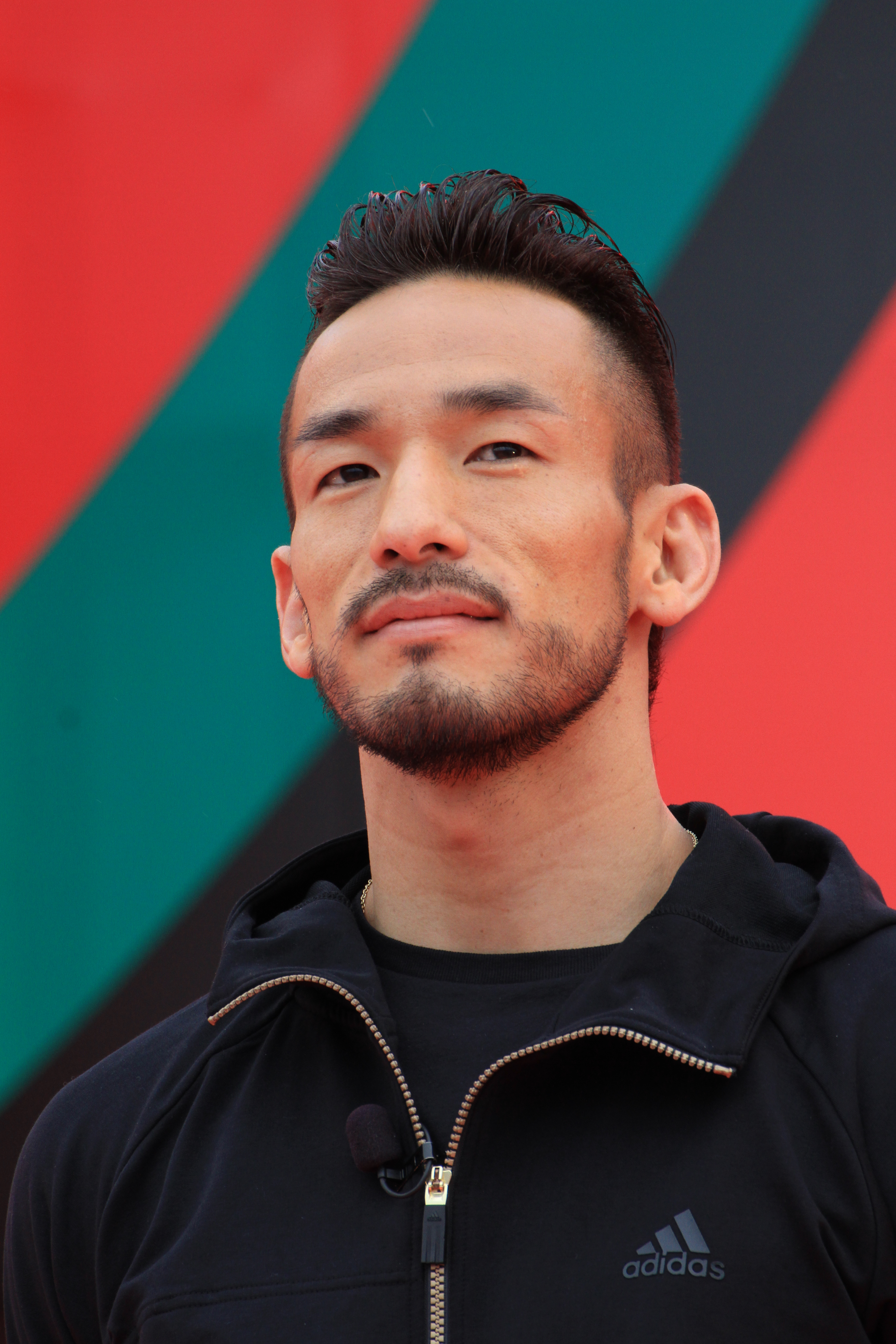
- Nakata in 2012

Personal information
- Full name: Hidetoshi Nakata
- Date of birth: 22 January 1977 (age 49)
- Place of birth: Kōfu, Yamanashi, Japan
- Height: 1.75 m (5 ft 9 in)
- Position: Midfielder

Youth career
- 1992–1994: Nirasaki High School

Senior career*
Years	Team	Apps	(Gls)
1995–1998	Bellmare Hiratsuka	85	(16)
1998–2000	Perugia	48	(12)
2000–2001	Roma	30	(5)
2001–2004	Parma	67	(5)
2004	→ Bologna (loan)	17	(2)
2004–2006	Fiorentina	20	(0)
2005–2006	→ Bolton Wanderers (loan)	21	(1)
Total		288	(41)

International career
1991–1993	Japan U17	6	(2)
1994–1995	Japan U20	12	(6)
1995–2000	Japan U23	12	(3)
1997–2006	Japan	77	(11)
- * Club domestic league appearances and goals

Hidetoshi Nakata, OSSI (中田 英寿, Nakata Hidetoshi; born 22 January 1977) is a Japanese former professional footballer who played as a midfielder. Considered as one of the greatest Asian football players of all time and coming from an Asian Football Confederation (AFC) country in the late 1990s and early 2000s, Nakata became the first ever AFC player to be nominated for the Ballon d'Or.

Nakata began his professional career in 1995 and won the Asian Football Confederation Player of the Year award in 1997 and 1998, the Scudetto with Roma in 2001, played for Japan in three World Cup tournaments (1998, 2002 and 2006) and competed in the Olympics twice (1996 and 2000). In 2005, he was made the Knight of the Order of the Star of Italian Solidarity, one of Italy's highest honors, for improving the country's image overseas. Nakata has also been involved in fashion, regularly attending runway shows and wearing designer clothing.

Nakata announced his retirement at the age of 29 on 3 July 2006, after a ten-year career that included seven seasons in the Italian Serie A and a season in the English Premier League. In March 2004, Pelé named Nakata in his FIFA 100, a list of the top living footballers at the time. Nakata was one of only two Asian footballers on the list.

== Club career ==
=== Bellmare ===
Nakata began his professional career at the age of 18 in 1995, with J1 League side Bellmare Hiratsuka (now Shonan Bellmare). He played many matches as an attacking midfielder in his first season and the club won the 1995 Asian Cup Winners' Cup, the first Asian title in the club's history. In the final against Al-Talaba, he scored the winning goal in the 81st minute. From 1996, he was a regular player and he was selected for the J.League Best XI in 1997.

=== Perugia ===
After the 1998 World Cup in France, Nakata was signed by Perugia in Italy's Serie A for 4 million U.S. dollars, becoming the second Japanese player ever to appear in the Italian top league after Kazuyoshi Miura had done it for Genoa four years earlier. Scepticism initially surrounded his arrival, but Nakata quickly established himself as a sensation in Italian football, scoring a brace on his debut against Juventus in a 3–4 defeat.

Operating primarily as an attacking midfielder, Nakata was known for his vision, passing range, and ability to contribute offensively with late runs and shots from distance. His technical skill was demonstrated early in his spell at the club by a notable acrobatic volley in a 2–0 win over Piacenza. Beyond his performances on the pitch, his transfer generated widespread attention, leading thousands of Japanese fans and specialized tour operators to travel to Umbria to watch matches at the Stadio Renato Curi, while also resulting in significant merchandise sales in Japan.

In his first season with the *Grifoni*, he played 32 matches and scored 10 goals—his single-season highest total—helping the club secure safety in Serie A. He continued to feature prominently into the following campaign, making 15 league appearances and scoring 2 goals before transferring midway through the season.

=== Roma ===
In January 2000, Nakata moved to Roma for 42 billion lire, helping the team win the scudetto. The highlight of Nakata's career at Roma came on 6 May 2001 in a Serie A match against Juventus at Stadio Delle Alpi. After replacing Francesco Totti in the second half with Roma trailing 0–2, Nakata netted with a 30-yard goal beyond Juventus goalkeeper Edwin van der Sar's reach, with 11 minutes left in the match. He then helped Roma score the equalizer when his fierce drive from outside the box was parried by Van der Sar into the path of Vincenzo Montella, who scored for Roma in the last minute. The match ended with a 2–2 draw and Roma maintained a six-point margin at the top of the league table.

=== Parma ===
In the summer of 2001, Nakata penned a four-year deal with Parma for a transfer fee of 55 billion lire, a world record payment for an Asian player which would not be broken for 14 years. He made his club debut on 8 August 2001 in their 0–2 defeat at Stadio Ennio Tardini against Lille in the first leg of the third round of the Champions League. More than one month later, on 23 September, Nakata scored his first goal for Parma in Serie A at home over Brescia, which also proved to be the winning goal of the match. Nakata played there for two and a half seasons, where he scored a crucial goal after coming on as a substitute in the first leg of the 2002 Coppa Italia final against Juventus, which Parma eventually won.

=== Later years ===
In January 2004, Nakata played for Bologna where he played the remainder of the 2003–04 season before moving to Fiorentina, where he played the following season. In August 2005, Nakata moved to Premiership side Bolton Wanderers on loan. During his season at Bolton, which would be the last of his professional career, he scored once in the league, in a 2–0 win over West Bromwich Albion.

== International career ==
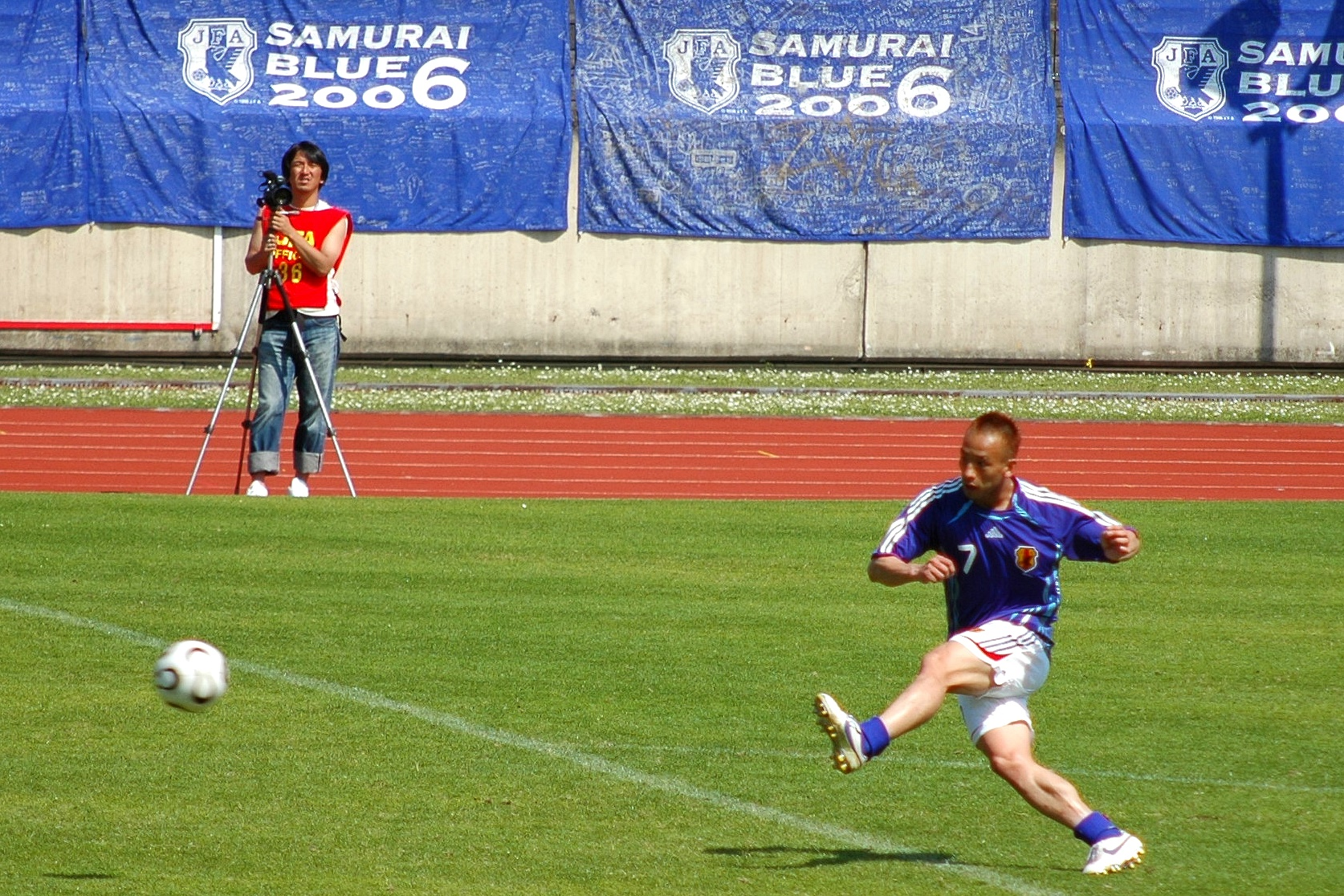
Nakata training with Japan at the 2006 World Cup

After having represented U-17 Japan at the 1993 U-17 World Championship (where he scored a goal) and U-20 Japan at the 1995 U-20 World Championship (where he scored twice), Nakata was part of the U-23 Japan squads at the 1996 Olympics, where Japan upset Brazil, and at the 2000 Olympics. His senior national team debut came in May 1997 against South Korea.

He was a key member of the Japanese side that qualified for the 1998 World Cup, scoring five goals in qualification matches and setting up all three Japanese goals in the qualification play-off against Iran. He helped Japan reach the final of the 2001 Confederations Cup but left the national team before the final to join Roma for their final league matches. Nakata played in all four of Japan's matches at the 2002 World Cup, co-hosted by South Korea and Japan, scoring the second goal of a 2–0 first round win against Tunisia.

At the 2006 World Cup, Nakata played in all three matches for Japan, losing to Australia and Brazil, and drawing with Croatia. His performance against Croatia earned him a Man of the Match award. After the 2006 FIFA World Cup, on 3 July 2006, Nakata announced his retirement from professional football and the Japanese national team on his personal website "I decided half a year ago that I would retire from the world of professional football ... after the World Cup in Germany." Nakata wrote, "I will never again stand on the pitch as a professional player. But I will never give up football." In a 2014 interview in TMW Magazine, Nakata confirmed that he had retired at such a young age because he was no longer enjoying football, and wanted instead to see what was going on in the world.

Despite Nakata playing every match in Japan's first three World Cup appearances, he was not selected for the country's Asian Cup-winning squads in 2000 and 2004. In total, he was capped 77 times for Japan, scoring 11 goals, 9 of which came in official FIFA competitions.

== Style of play ==
A quick, creative, and hard-working attacking or central midfielder, with an eye for goal, Nakata was known for his technical ability, agility, vision, passing, and his ability to make attacking runs into the penalty area and score goals; he also possessed a powerful shot from outside the box.

== Outside football ==
Outside football, Nakata has shown interest in fashion, attending runway shows, wearing designer clothing and sporting colorful haircuts. He dyed his hair blond for the 1998 World Cup, hoping to attract the attention of European scouts. Japanese hairstylist Aki Watanabe credits him as a trendsetter. Andrea Tenerani, photographer for GQ in Italy said of Nakata, "He's perfect; he's like a model. And he's totally obsessed with fashion." Calvin Klein designer Italo Zucchelli said, "(Nakata) plays with fashion like all of them now, but in a cooler, more sophisticated way than many others." He is one of the models featuring the Calvin Klein underwear campaign 2010. He was featured in the July 2007 US version of GQ with a 12-page spread on fall fashion. He was featured in GQ in his home country in December 2011.

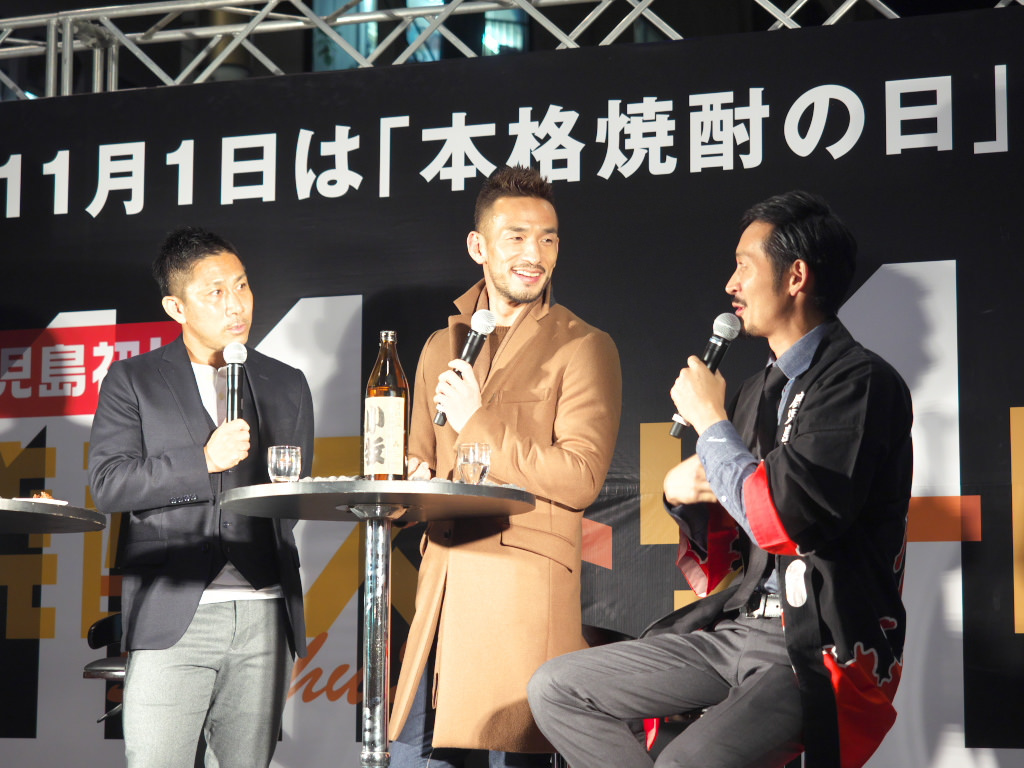
Nakata (middle) at a fashion event in Tokyo, November 2016

Often regarded as a Japanese David Beckham, Nakata is an editor-at-large at Monocle magazine at the invitation of his friend Tyler Brûlé, who serves as the magazine's editor-in-chief. Nakata has cited the popular manga and anime series, Captain Tsubasa, as his primary inspiration in choosing football as a career. In recent years, he has also been an active supporter of Special Olympics football and participated in the 2010 Special Olympics Unity Cup in South Africa during the World Cup. Nakata was named a Global Ambassador for Special Olympics in 2014.

Towards the end of 2015, Nakata entered into a partnership with Kee Club in Hong Kong to open Koko, a Hong Kong-based restaurant that serves sakes created by Nakata himself. He has developed his own line of sake as well as creating his own mobile educational app, "Sakenomy". Expressing interest in educating the public about sake, Nakata stated, "People recognise brands of wine but not usually brands of sake. There is a lack of information and branding when it comes to sake. That’s why I thought I needed to create a brand that people can recognise and understand. My purpose is to expand the market for all sake not just my own. You can pair any type of cuisine with sake. It can go with French, Italian, even Chinese food, not just Japanese cuisine."

=== Media ===
Having been signed to sportswear company Nike, Nakata featured in Nike's "Secret Tournament" advertisement (branded "Scorpion KO") directed by Terry Gilliam, in the buildup to the 2002 World Cup in Korea and Japan. He appeared alongside other star football players from around the world, including Ronaldo, Ronaldinho, Luís Figo, Thierry Henry, Roberto Carlos and Francesco Totti, with former player Eric Cantona the tournament "referee". Nakata featured on the front cover of various Japanese editions of EA Sports’ FIFA video game series, including FIFA Football 2002. In 2018, Nakata was added as an icon to the Ultimate Team in FIFA 19. In the 2012 video game Inazuma Eleven 2: Firestorm / Blizzard Nakata was added as a hidden playable player. He then served an important story role in Inazuma Eleven 3 and its respective anime series, where Nakata would serve as the captain of the Italian team Orpheus.

== Career statistics ==
=== Club ===
Appearances and goals by club, season and competition
Club	Season	League			National Cup		League Cup		Continental (Note: Appearances in Asian Cup Winners' Cup, UEFA Intertoto Cup, UEFA Cup and UEFA Champions League)		Other (Note: Appearances in Japanese Super Cup and Supercoppa Italiana)		Total	
Club	Season	Division	Apps	Goals	Apps	Goals	Apps	Goals	Apps	Goals	Apps	Goals	Apps	Goals
Bellmare Hiratsuka	1995	J1 League	26	8	2	1	—		6	1	1	0	35	10
Bellmare Hiratsuka	1996	J1 League	26	2	3	0	12	2	3	0	—		44	4
Bellmare Hiratsuka	1997	J1 League	21	3	3	0	6	1	—		—		30	4
Bellmare Hiratsuka	1998	J1 League	12	3	—		—		—		—		12	3
Bellmare Hiratsuka	Total		85	16	8	1	18	3	9	1	1	0	121	21
Perugia	1998–99	Serie A	33	10	—		0	0	—		—		33	10
Perugia	1999–2000	Serie A	15	2	—		4	1	3	1	—		22	4
Perugia	Total		48	12	—		4	1	3	1	—		55	14
Roma	1999–2000	Serie A	15	3	—		1	0	2	0	—		18	3
Roma	2000–01	Serie A	15	2	—		0	0	7	1	—		22	3
Roma	Total		30	5	—		1	0	9	1	—		40	6
Parma	2001–02	Serie A	24	1	—		6	2	8	1	—		38	4
Parma	2002–03	Serie A	31	4	—		1	0	4	0	1	0	37	4
Parma	2003–04	Serie A	12	0	—		2	0	3	1	—		17	1
Parma	Total		67	5	—		9	2	15	2	1	0	92	9
Bologna (loan)	2003–04	Serie A	17	2	—		0	0	—		—		17	2
Fiorentina	2004–05	Serie A	20	0	—		4	0	—		—		24	0
Bolton Wanderers (loan)	2005–06	Premier League	21	1	3	0	2	0	6	0	—		32	1
Career total			288	41	11	1	38	6	42	5	2	0	381	53

=== International ===
Appearances and goals by national team and year
National team	Year	Apps	Goals
Japan	1997	16	5
Japan	1998	10	1
Japan	1999	3	0
Japan	2000	4	0
Japan	2001	7	1
Japan	2002	8	2
Japan	2003	11	1
Japan	2004	2	0
Japan	2005	10	0
Japan	2006	6	1
Total		77	11

Scores and results list Japan's goal tally first, score column indicates score after each Nakata goal.

List of international goals scored by Hidetoshi Nakata
No.	Date	Venue	Opponent	Score	Result	Competition
1	22 June 1997	Tokyo, Japan	Macau	1–0	10–0	1998 FIFA World Cup Qualification first round
2	22 June 1997	Tokyo, Japan	Macau	8–0	10–0	1998 FIFA World Cup Qualification first round
3	28 June 1997	Tokyo, Japan	Oman	1–0	1–1	1998 FIFA World Cup Qualification First round
4	7 September 1997	Tokyo, Japan	Uzbekistan	3–0	6–3	1998 FIFA World Cup Qualification Final round
5	8 November 1997	Tokyo, Japan	Kazakhstan	2–0	5–1	1998 FIFA World Cup Qualification Final round
6	15 February 1998	Adelaide, Australia	Australia	1–0	3–0	Friendly
7	7 June 2001	Yokohama, Japan	Australia	1–0	1–0	2001 FIFA Confederations Cup Semi-finals
8	27 March 2002	Łódź, Poland	Poland	1–0	2–0	Friendly
9	14 June 2002	Osaka, Japan	Tunisia	2–0	2–0	2002 FIFA World Cup Group Stage
10	18 June 2003	Saint-Denis, France	New Zealand	2–0	3–0	2003 FIFA Confederations Cup Group Stage
11	28 February 2006	Dortmund, Germany	Bosnia and Herzegovina	2–2	2–2	Friendly

== Honours ==
Bellmare Hiratsuka

- Asian Cup Winners Cup: 1995

Roma

- Serie A: 2000–01

Parma

- Coppa Italia: 2001–02

Japan

- Kirin Cup: 1997
- Dynasty Cup: 1998

Individual

- J. League All-Star Soccer: 1997
- J. League Best XI: 1997
- Japanese Footballer of the Year: 1997
- Japan Professional Sports Grand Prize: 1997
- AFC Player of the Year: 1997, 1998
- AFC Player of the Month: May 1997, March 1998
- Dynasty Cup MVP: 1998
- AFC All Star Team: 1997, 1998, 1999
- FIFA Confederations Cup Bronze Ball: 2001
- FIFA Confederations Cup Best XI: 2001
- FIFA World Cup All-Star Team: 2002 (Reserve)
- FIFA World Cup Fans' All-Star Team: 2002
- J.League 20th Anniversary Team
- FIFA 100
- Golden Foot Legends Award: 2014
- IFFHS Legends
- AFC Opta All-time XI at the FIFA World Cup: 2020
- AFC Fans' All-time XI at the FIFA World Cup: 2020
- Globe Soccer Awards Player Career Award: 2025 (shared)

== Achievements ==
- Nominated for Ballon d'Or: 1998, 1999, 2001
- Nominated for FIFA World Player of the Year: 1998, 1999, 2001, 2002
