= Stefano Fanucci =

Italian footballer

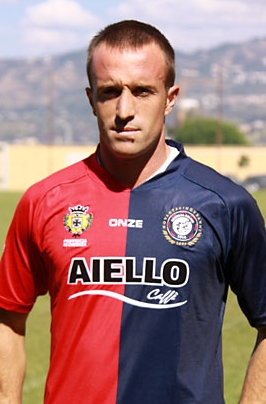
- Fanucci in 2009

Personal information
- Date of birth: 21 January 1979 (age 47)
- Place of birth: Rome, Italy
- Height: 1.80 m (5 ft 11 in)
- Position: Defender

Youth career
- Roma

Senior career*
Years	Team	Apps	(Gls)
1997–1998	Roma	0	(0)
1998–1999	→ Teramo (loan)	22	(0)
1999–2000	→ Savoia (loan)	10	(1)
2000–2007	Livorno	96	(3)
2004–2005	→ Pescara (loan)	30	(0)
2007–2008	Ancona	28	(0)
2008–2009	Arezzo	28	(1)
2009–2011	Cosenza	32	(1)
2011	→ Ternana (loan)	8	(0)
- * Club domestic league appearances and goals as of 29 July 2011

Stefano Fanucci (born 21 January 1979) is a former Italian footballer who played as a defender.

== Biography ==
Fanucci was loaned to Teramo and Savoia in 1998-99 and 1999–2000 season and awarded the two clubs 100 million Italian lire and 300 million lire respectively for development bonus for the player in 2000. In summer 2000, he was sold to Livorno for 150 million lire. and in next season Livorno bought the remain rights for another 200 million lire (about €100 thousand).
