= Paulo Sérgio (footballer, born June 1969) =

Brazilian footballer

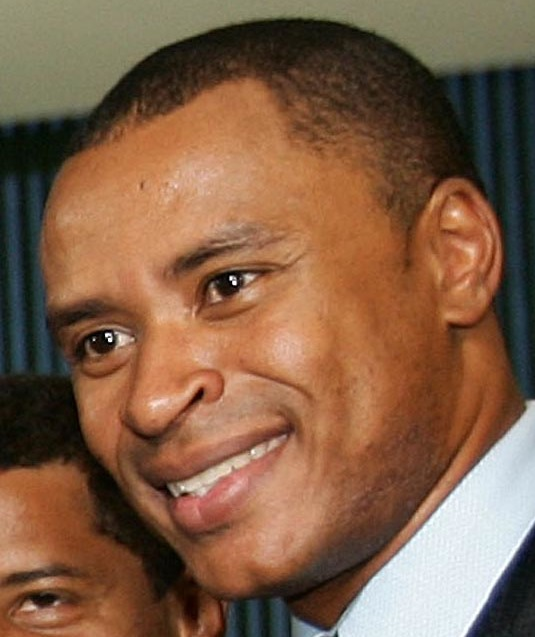
- Paulo Sérgio in 2005

Personal information
- Full name: Paulo Sérgio Silvestre do Nascimento
- Date of birth: 3 June 1969 (age 57)
- Place of birth: São Paulo, Brazil
- Height: 1.80 m (5 ft 11 in)
- Position: Forward

Senior career*
Years	Team	Apps	(Gls)
1988–1993	Corinthians	64	(5)
1989–1990	→ Novorizontino (loan)		
1993–1997	Bayer Leverkusen	121	(64)
1997–1999	Roma	64	(24)
1999–2002	Bayern Munich	77	(21)
2002	Al Wahda		
2003	Bahia	8	(0)
Total		334+	(97+)

International career
1991–1994	Brazil	12	(2)

Managerial career
- 2008: Red Bull Brasil
Medal record
Men's football
Representing Brazil
FIFA World Cup
Winner	1994 USA
- * Club domestic league appearances and goals

Paulo Sérgio Silvestre do Nascimento (born 2 June 1969), commonly known as Paulo Sérgio, is a Brazilian former footballer who played as a forward. Whilst at German club Bayern Munich, he won the Champions League in 2001.

== Club career ==
Paulo Sérgio rose to prominence at Corinthians, where he was a key player in the early 1990s. In 1993, he was signed by Bayer Leverkusen, where he played for four seasons. His form was good enough for him to be included in the Brazil national team, although he was not among the top scorers of Bundesliga. He was rated as a top class second striker.

In 1997, Paulo Sérgio was bought by Italian club Roma, where he played for two seasons. He formed an effective striking partnership with the emerging Francesco Totti and Marco Delvecchio, scoring 22 goals in 57 league appearances. When Roma signed Vincenzo Montella from relegated Sampdoria in 1999, he moved on. FC Bayern Munich became his new employer, and in his three years at Bayern, he won both Champions League and Bundesliga, his finest club honours.

In 2002, Bayern signed several new players, and Paulo Sérgio was no longer in the first team plans, prompting him to move to Al Wahda in Abu Dhabi, before finishing his career back in Bahia in his native Brazil.

=== Post-retirement ===
He started his coaching career at Red Bull Brasil in 2008. On the team, he worked with another former idol of the Corinthians: Gilmar Fubá. He was the presenter and judge of the Menino de Ouro (en:Golden Boy) reality show, shown by the SBT between 2013 and 2014. He was also Sports Secretary of the Municipality of Barueri between January 2013 and June 2015. Sergio currently owns the Business Management company PS7TE Participações and is a Bundesliga ambassador. Between 2018 and 2021, he was hired by RedeTV!, where he joined the sports department as a commentator. In September 2021, he was hired to comment on the programs Mesa Redonda e Gazeta Esportiva, shown by TV Gazeta. In 2025 he started leading the Bayer 04 Football Academy in São Paulo.

== International career ==
Paulo Sérgio was capped for Brazil 13 times between 1991 and 1994, scoring twice, and was a member of the Brazilian squad that won the 1994 FIFA World Cup.

== Career statistics ==
=== Club ===
Appearances and goals by club, season and competition
Club	Season	League			National Cup		League Cup		Continental		Other		Total	
Club	Season	Division	Apps	Goals	Apps	Goals	Apps	Goals	Apps	Goals	Apps	Goals	Apps	Goals
Corinthians	1988	Série A	7	0			—		—				7	0
Corinthians	1989	Série A	0	0			—		—				0	0
Corinthians	1990	Série A	19	2			—		—				19	2
Corinthians	1991	Série A	15	1			—		7	4			22	5
Corinthians	1992	Série A	23	2			—		—				23	2
Corinthians	1993	Série A	0	0			—		—				0	0
Corinthians	Total		64	5			—		7	4			71	9
Novorizontino (loan)	1989	Paulista					—		—		—			
Novorizontino (loan)	1990	Paulista					—		—		—			
Novorizontino (loan)	Total						—		—					
Bayer Leverkusen	1993–94	Bundesliga	32	17	4	3	—		5	1	1 (Note: Appearances in DFB-Supercup)	0	42	21
Bayer Leverkusen	1994–95	Bundesliga	28	9	2	5	—		8	4	—		38	18
Bayer Leverkusen	1995–96	Bundesliga	28	4	5	1	—		—		—		33	5
Bayer Leverkusen	1996–97	Bundesliga	33	17	1	0	—		—		—		34	17
Bayer Leverkusen	Total		121	47	12	9	—		13	5	1	0	147	61
Roma	1997–98	Serie A	34	12	5	2	—		—		—		39	14
Roma	1998–99	Serie A	30	12	2	0	—		6	0	—		38	12
Roma	Total		64	24	7	2	—		6	0	—		77	26
Bayern Munich	1999–2000	Bundesliga	28	13	5	1	2	1	13	7	—		48	22
Bayern Munich	2000–01	Bundesliga	26	5	1	0	0	0	11	3	—		38	8
Bayern Munich	2001–02	Bundesliga	23	3	2	0	1	0	12	2	1 (Note: Appearances in Intercontinental Cup)	0	39	5
Bayern Munich	Total		77	21	8	1	3	1	36	12	1	0	125	35
Al Wahda	2002–03	UAE Football League							—					
Bahia	2003	Série A	8	0					—				8	0
Career total														

== Honours ==
=== Club ===
Corinthians

- Campeonato Brasileiro Série A: 1990
- Supercopa do Brasil: 1991

Bayern Munich

- UEFA Champions League: 2000–01
- Intercontinental Cup: 2001
- Bundesliga: 1999–2000, 2000–01
- DFB-Pokal: 1999–2000
- DFB-Ligapokal: 1999, 2000

=== International ===
Brazil

- FIFA World Cup: 1994

=== Individual ===
- Bundesliga Goal of the Month (2):
  - November 1996 (with Bayer Leverkusen vs. FC Köln)
  - September 1999(with Bayern Munich vs. PSV Eindhoven)
- Official Bundesliga International Ambassador (Appointed by the DFL)
- Bayer Leverkusen Hall of Fame (Inducted into the Official Club Legends List)
- FC Bayern Munich Legends Member (Permanent Lifetime Member)
- (Brazil) Brazilian Order of Sports Merit: 1994
