= 2003–04 Beşiktaş J.K. season =

Beşiktaş J.K.
2003–04 season
- President: Serdar Bilgili
- Manager: Mircea Lucescu
- Stadium: BJK İnönü Stadium
- Turkish Super League: 3rd
- Turkish Cup: Second Round
- UEFA Champions League: Group Stages (3rd)
- UEFA Cup: Third Round
- Top goalscorer: Ahmed Hassan (14)

The 2003–04 season was the club's 46th season in the Turkish Super League and their 101st year in existence. Beşiktaş finished the Super League 3rd, behind Fenerbahçe and Trabzonspor. By finishing 1st last year the club qualified for the 2003–04 UEFA Champions League. They, along with Galatasaray represented Turkey in the competition. They finished third, thereby proceeded the UEFA Cup where they lost in the Second Round to FC Valencia 5–2 on aggregate.

== Süper Lig ==
=== Standings ===
Pos	Team	Pld	W	D	L	GF	GA	GD	Pts	Qualification or relegation
1	Fenerbahçe (C)	34	23	7	4	82	41	+41	76	Qualification to Champions League group stage (Note: FC Porto, winner of 2003–04 UEFA Champions League, qualified for the UEFA Champions League group stage by their league position, so the title holder spot couldn't be used and this spot goes to best excluded champions, champions of Turkey, originally qualified for the third qualifying round.)
2	Trabzonspor	34	22	6	6	60	38	+22	72	Qualification to Champions League second qualifying round
3	Beşiktaş	34	18	8	8	65	45	+20	62	Qualification to UEFA Cup first round
4	Gaziantepspor	34	18	3	13	52	51	+1	57	
5	Denizlispor	34	17	4	13	52	43	+9	55	

Rules for classification: 1) points; 2) goal difference; 3) number of goals scored.
(C) Champions
