= Marco Quadrini =

Italian footballer

Personal information
- Date of birth: January 30, 1979 (age 47)
- Place of birth: Rome, Italy
- Height: 1.83 m (6 ft 0 in)
- Position: Defender

Senior career*
Years	Team	Apps	(Gls)
1997–1999	Roma	12	(0)
2000	→ Genoa (loan)	1	(0)
2000–2001	→ Palermo (loan)	4	(0)
2001–2004	Napoli	14	(0)
2004–2006	Fermana	43	(1)

International career
1998	Italy U-20	2	(0)
1999	Italy U-21	1	(0)
- * Club domestic league appearances and goals

Marco Quadrini (born January 30, 1979, in Rome) is an Italian former footballer who played as a defender. He played in the Serie A in one season only, collecting 12 appearances for A.S. Roma in the 1998/99 campaign. He also played for Roma in the UEFA Cup that season.

He was swapped club with Luigi Malafronte of Napoli in 2001–02 season.
