= Andrea Campagnolo =

Italian football goalkeeper (born 1978)

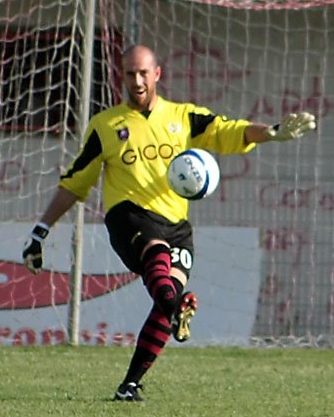

Personal information
- Full name: Andrea Campagnolo
- Date of birth: 17 June 1978 (age 48)
- Place of birth: Bassano del Grappa, Italy
- Height: 1.84 m (6 ft 0 in)
- Position: Goalkeeper

Youth career
- Cittadella

Senior career*
Years	Team	Apps	(Gls)
1995–1997	Cittadella	0	(0)
1997–2000	AS Roma	0	(0)
2000–2002	Genoa	4	(0)
2002–2003	Vicenza	5	(0)
2003–2005	Triestina	48	(0)
2005–2006	Cagliari	11	(0)
2006–2009	Reggina	92	(0)
2009–2012	Catania	8	(0)
2012–2013	Siena	0	(0)
2013–2014	Cesena	31	(0)
- * Club domestic league appearances and goals as of 22 March 2013 ‡ National team caps and goals as of 5 July 2012

Andrea Campagnolo (born 17 June 1978) is an Italian football goalkeeper.

== Club career ==
=== A.S. Cittadella ===
Campagnolo started his career off in the early 1990s playing for the A.S. Cittadella youth squad, before moving to the senior squad in 1995. He remained with Cittadella until 1997, when he transferred to A.S. Roma in the Italian Serie A. He moved to the capital club without ever making a first team appearance for the club.

=== A.S. Roma ===
Roma quickly pounced on the player in the summer of 1997 as the club directors considered the young Campagnolo to be a very promising young goalkeeper and held on to their man until 2000. After not making even a single appearance for the capital club he transferred to Genoa CFC, who were at the time playing in the Serie B.

=== Genoa C.F.C. ===
After his official transfer to the Ligurian club, Campagnolo spent his first season with the club as a reserve goal keeper, but remained at the club the following season. Campagnolo again served as a second-choice keeper during the 2001–02 Serie B season, and only made 4 league appearances. Hence, after only managing to make 4 appearances with the Ligurian side after 2 seasons, he was sold to fellow Serie B club, Vicenza Calcio.

=== Vicenza Calcio ===
Campagnolo officially transferred to Vicenza Calcio during the 2002 summer transfer window, and again, the young Italian goalkeeper found it hard to break into the starting eleven and in his lone season, he made just 5 appearances, and was again sold. This time the shot-stopper transferred to yet another Serie B club, in the form of U.S. Triestina Calcio.

=== U.S. Triestina ===
After a disappointing start to his career, Campagnolo moved from Vicenza Calcio to U.S. Triestina Calcio in 2003. In his first season with his new club, Campagnolo managed to appear in 18 Serie B matches, and during the 2004–2005 Serie B season, he broke into the starting eleven and made over 30 appearances for his club. He remained in Trieste until the conclusion of the 2004–05 season. In those two seasons with Triestina, Campagnolo made 48 total league appearances. After several impressive performances with the club he was sold to Serie A side Cagliari Calcio.

=== Cagliari Calcio ===
Despite undergoing two impressive seasons with Triestina, and having plenty of potential, he again failed to obtain a consistent starting spot for the Sardinian club, and made just 11 appearances during the 2005–2006 Serie A season. After just one season in Sardinia, he was sold to Reggina Calcio, ahead of the 2006–2007 Serie A campaign.

=== Reggina Calcio ===
After small stints with 6 different clubs in his career, Campagnolo moved to another Serie A side, Reggina Calcio in July 2006. The net-minder moved to Calabria as a second choice goalkeeper, but following the sales of Ivan Pelizzoli to Lokomotiv Moscow and Nicola Pavarini to US Lecce in January 2007, he became the first choice goalkeeper. Campagnolo held on to his starting position and made 15 appearances in the second half of the Serie A season. He made 35 appearances in his second season with the southern Italian club, and managed to help Reggina narrowly avoid relegation for the second consecutive season. His third season with the club, was cut slightly short, as the keeper made just 23 appearances due to injury, and Reggina were relegated to the Serie B at the conclusion of the 2008–09 Serie A season, following a seven-year stint in the top flight of Italian football. Campagnolo made 92 appearances for the Calabrian club, in the league alone. Because of the club's relegation, the player was sold to Sicilian giants Calcio Catania.

=== Calcio Catania ===
On 6 June 2009, it was confirmed that Campagnolo had signed for Sicilian giants, Calcio Catania, another Serie A club. The club signed the goalkeeper from Reggina Calcio until 30 June 2012, as a reserve to Argentine international keeper Mariano Andujar. Campagnolo was eventually fined by Lega Calcio due to disrespect to the contract with Reggina Calcio for the transfer statement. In his first season with Catania, Campagnolo was plagued by injury, and despite being listed as a back-up failed to be present on the bench for much of the season. Campagnolo did manage to make 3 league appearances for the club, including a final matchday win over former employers, Genoa C.F.C. The veteran made just one appearance for the club during the 2010–11 Serie A season, which came on the final matchday.

During the 2011–12 Serie A season, Campagnolo again remained second choice, behind Andújar for the third season in the running, however, following a mid-season fallout with the club, Andújar was released on loan to former club Estudiantes, and following his departure, Campagnolo made 4 consecutive Serie A starts before succumbing to injury in late January and has since lost his place to Tomáš Košický and new arrival Juan Pablo Carrizo. His contract with Catania expired on 30 June 2012.

=== Siena ===
On 22 July 2012 Campagnolo signed a contract to play with Serie A club A.C. Siena.

=== Cesena ===
On 9 January 2013 he was signed by Serie B club A.C. Cesena on free transfer. On 21 May 2013 he signed a new 1-year contract with the club.
