= Fábio Júnior (footballer, born 1977) =

Brazilian footballer

Personal information
- Full name: Fábio Júnior Pereira
- Date of birth: 20 November 1977 (age 48)
- Place of birth: Manhuaçu, Brazil
- Height: 1.86 m (6 ft 1 in)
- Position: Striker

Youth career
- 1993–1997: Democrata-GV
- 1997: Cruzeiro

Senior career*
Years	Team	Apps	(Gls)
1997–1998	Cruzeiro	40	(18)
1998–2000	Roma	16	(4)
2000	Cruzeiro	22	(9)
2001	Palmeiras	20	(3)
2002	Cruzeiro	25	(12)
2003	Vitória Guimarães	4	(0)
2003	Atlético Mineiro	34	(14)
2004	Kashima Antlers	13	(1)
2005	Atlético Mineiro	15	(3)
2005	Al Wahda	52	(15)
2006–2007	VfL Bochum	31	(3)
2007–2008	Hapoel Tel Aviv	15	(5)
2008	Bahia	17	(7)
2009	Santo André	14	(6)
2009	Brasiliense	23	(10)
2010–2013	América-MG	122	(36)
2014	Minas Boca	11	(3)
2014	Boa Esporte	6	(1)
2015–2016	Guarani de Divinópolis	11	(0)
2016–2017	Villa Nova	9	(4)

International career
1999–2000	Brazil U-23	12	(8)
1998–1999	Brazil	3	(1)
- * Club domestic league appearances and goals

Fábio Júnior Pereira (born 20 November 1977), commonly known as just Fábio Júnior, is a Brazilian football pundit and retired footballer who played as a forward.

== Career ==
Born in the São Pedro do Avaí district of Manhuaçu, Fábio Júnior began playing professional football in his home state, Minas Gerais. He has played for each of the three large professional clubs based in the capital of Belo Horizonte, Cruzeiro, Atlético Mineiro and América-MG.

He was found using a fake passport to play as an EU-player in Italy, he was then fined and banned in Italy football for a season, although he never played again in Italy.

== Career statistics ==
=== Club ===
Appearances and goals by club, season and competition
Club	Season	League			National Cup		League Cup		Total	
Club	Season	Division	Apps	Goals	Apps	Goals	Apps	Goals	Apps	Goals
Cruzeiro	1997	Série A	8	0			—			
Cruzeiro	1998	Série A	32	18			—			
Cruzeiro	Total		40	18			0	0		
Roma	1998–99	Serie A	7	3			—			
Roma	1999–00	Serie A	9	1			—			
Roma	Total		16	4			0	0		
Cruzeiro	2000	Série A	18	7			—			
Palmeiras	2001	Série A	20	3			—			
Cruzeiro	2002	Série A	25	12			—			
Vitória Guimarães	2002–03	Primeira Liga	4	0						
Atlético Mineiro	2003	Série A	34	14			—			
Kashima Antlers	2004	J1 League	13	1	2	1	2	0	17	2
Atlético Mineiro	2005	Série A	15	3			—			
Al Wahda	2005–06	UAE League	0	0			—			
VfL Bochum	2005–06	2. Bundesliga	15	1	0	0	—		15	1
VfL Bochum	2006–07	Bundesliga	16	2	2	0	—		18	2
VfL Bochum	Total		31	3	2	0	0	0	33	3
Hapoel Tel Aviv	2007–08	Premier League	33	7					33	7
Bahia	2008	Série B	0	0			—			
Brasiliense	2009	Série B	23	10			—			
América Mineiro	2010	Série B	34	19			—			
América Mineiro	2011	Série A					—			
América Mineiro	Total						0	0		
Career total			272	82						

=== International ===
Appearances and goals by national team and year
National team	Year	Apps	Goals
Brazil	1998	1	0
Brazil	1999	2	1
Total		3	1

== Honours ==
Cruzeiro

- Copa Sul-Minas: 2002
- Campeonato Mineiro: 1997, 1998, 2002
- Copa do Brasil: 2000

Brasiliense

- Campeonato Brasiliense: 2008

Al-Wahda

- UAE League: 2005
