= Filippo Dal Moro =

Italian footballer

Personal information
- Date of birth: 11 August 1970 (age 56)
- Place of birth: Treviso, Italy
- Height: 1.71 m (5 ft 7 1/2 in)
- Position: Defender

Senior career*
Years	Team	Apps	(Gls)
1988–1989	Sampdoria	0	(0)
1989–1990	Teramo	32	(3)
1990–1991	Udinese	0	(0)
1991–1992	Pistoiese	36	(4)
1992–1994	Giarre	37	(2)
1993–1994	→ Venezia (loan)	24	(1)
1994–1997	Empoli	90	(6)
1997–2000	Roma	12	(0)
1998–1999	→ Ternana (loan)	9	(1)
1999–2000	→ AEK Athens (loan)	0	(0)
2000–2001	Ravenna	16	(0)
2001–2004	Novara	65	(4)
Total		321	(21)
- * Club domestic league appearances and goals

Filippo Dal Moro (born 11 August 1970) is an Italian former professional footballer.

== Club career ==
Dal Moro started in 1988 at Sampdoria. In 1989 he moved to Teramo in order to get more playing time. In the following season he signed for Udinese, but he failed to establish himself and moved for to Pistoiese for a season. Afterwards he joined Giarre and in 1993 he was loaned to Venezia. In 1994, he joined Empoli where he was established in the squad. In 1997 he made the big step of his career and moved to Roma. In his first season in Rome he played in 12 championship matches and also played for Roma in the 1998–99 UEFA Cup, while in the following season he was loaned to Ternana. Afterwards he returned to Roma, where he didn't take any chances. On 31 January 2000 he was loaned to the Greek side, AEK Athens for a fee of 30 million drachmas and a buy-out option. After his unsuccessful spell in Greece, he moved to Ravenna for a season before ending his career at Novara in 2004.
