= Alessandro Frau =

Italian footballer (born 1977)

Personal information
- Date of birth: 2 April 1977 (age 49)
- Place of birth: Porto Torres, Italy
- Height: 1.74 m (5 ft 9 in)
- Position: Forward

Team information
- Current team: Alghero

Youth career
- 1992–1993: Turris Porto Torres

Senior career*
Years	Team	Apps	(Gls)
1993–1998	S.E.F. Torres 1903	111	(17)
1995–1996	→ Avellino (loan)	0	(0)
1998–2001	Roma	7	(0)
1999–2000	→ Palermo (loan)	24	(5)
2000–2001	→ Pisa (loan)	24	(3)
2001	Internazionale	0	(0)
2001–2002	Viterbese	29	(11)
2002–2003	Sassari Torres	32	(5)
2003–2004	Viterbese	24	(6)
2004–2005	Pistoiese	25	(0)
2005–2008	Sassari Torres	88	(30)
2008–2009	Alghero	26	(5)
2009–	Porto Torres		

International career
1998	Italy U21	1	(0)
- * Club domestic league appearances and goals as of July 2009

Alessandro Frau (born 2 April 1977) is an Italian former footballer who played for Alghero.

Frau made his Serie A debut for A.S. Roma against Salernitana on 13 September 1998.

Frau was exchanged for Gianmarco Frezza from Internazionale in July 2001, but he never played for Internazionale.

After the bankrupt of S.E.F. Torres 1903, he joined Alghero.
