= Gustavo Bartelt =

Argentine footballer

Personal information
- Full name: Gustavo Javier Bartelt
- Date of birth: 2 September 1974 (age 52)
- Place of birth: Buenos Aires, Argentina
- Height: 1.83 m (6 ft 0 in)
- Position: Forward

Senior career*
Years	Team	Apps	(Gls)
1993–1997	All Boys	92	(25)
1997–1998	Lanús	18	(13)
1998–2003	Roma	15	(0)
2000	→ Aston Villa (loan)	0	(0)
2000–2001	→ Rayo Vallecano (loan)	12	(1)
2003–2004	Gimnasia La Plata	35	(1)
2004–2005	Talleres	?	(?)
2005–2006	Gimnasia de Jujuy	16	(0)
2008–2009	All Boys	35	(2)
2011	All Boys	1	(0)

Managerial career
- 2019: All Boys
- * Club domestic league appearances and goals

Gustavo Javier Bartelt (born 2 September 1974) is an Argentine former footballer who played as a forward.

== Career ==
Bartelt started playing for All Boys in 1993. He then played for Lanús, Roma, Aston Villa (on loan from Roma), Rayo, Gimnasia La Plata, Talleres and Gimnasia de Jujuy.

While at Roma, both Bartelt and Cafu were accused of using false documents to gain Italian passports. Bartelt was banned for one year and Cafu was acquitted. He never played for Roma again until released in 2003 and until 2006 was acquitted by the court for the fake documents charge.

The forward retired playing for All Boys in 2009. However, in 2011 he came out of retirement to play again for that club, but this time in the Primera División.

== Coaching career ==
In February 2019, Bartelt was appointed joint-manager alongside Pablo Solchaga for All Boys. The duo was fired on 15 September 2019.
