= 1999–2000 RC Lens season =

Lens
1999–2000 season
- President: Gervais Martel
- Manager: François Brisson
- Stadium: Stade Félix-Bollaert
- Division 1: 5th
- Coupe de France: Round of 64
- Coupe de la Ligue: Round of 32
- UEFA Cup: Semi-finals
- Top goalscorer: League: Pascal Nouma; Lamine Sakho (8); All: Pascal Nouma (14)
- Average home league attendance: 38,805

The 1999–2000 season was the 93rd season in the existence of RC Lens and the club's 11th consecutive season in the top flight of French football. In addition to the domestic league, Lens participated in this season's editions of the Coupe de France, the Coupe de la Ligue and the UEFA Cup. The season covered the period from 1 July 1999 to 30 June 2000.

== Season summary ==
Lens reached the UEFA Cup semi-final before being eliminated by Arsenal.

== First team squad ==
Squad at end of season

Note: Flags indicate national team as defined under FIFA eligibility rules; some limited exceptions apply. Players may hold more than one non-FIFA nationality.

No.	Pos.	Nation	Player
1	GK	FRA	Guillaume Warmuz
2	DF	FRA	Éric Sikora
3	DF	FRA	Yoann Lachor
4	MF	FRA	Olivier Dacourt
5	MF	FRA	Jocelyn Blanchard
6	MF	FRA	Cyril Rool
7	FW	FRA	Bruno Rodriguez
8	MF	FRA	Stéphane Collet
9	MF	GHA	Alex Nyarko
10	FW	FRA	Daniel Moreira
11	FW	CMR	Joseph-Désiré Job (Note: Job was born in Lyon, France, but also qualified to represent Cameroon internationally, and made his international debut for Cameroon in 1997.)
12	MF	MAR	Redouanne El Ouardi
13	DF	FRA	Youl Mawéné
14	DF	SEN	Ferdinand Coly

No.	Pos.	Nation	Player
16	GK	FRA	Sébastien Chabbert
18	MF	FRA	Philippe Brunel
19	DF	FRA	Patrick Barul
20	FW	SEN	Lamine Sakho
21	MF	FRA	Pascal Nouma
22	DF	FRA	Xavier Méride
23	DF	MLI	Adama Coulibaly
24	DF	FRA	José-Karl Pierre-Fanfan
25	DF	FRA	Valérien Ismaël
26	MF	MTQ	Charles-Édouard Coridon
27	FW	FRA	Olivier Bogaczyk
28	DF	FRA	Franck Queudrue
29	MF	FRA	Ludovic Delporte
30	GK	FRA	Cédric Berthelin

== Transfers ==
=== In ===
- Olivier Dacourt - Everton
- Bruno Rodriguez - Paris Saint-Germain

== Competitions ==
=== French Division 1 ===
==== League table ====
Pos	Team	Pld	W	D	L	GF	GA	GD	Pts	Qualification or relegation
3	Lyon	34	16	8	10	45	42	+3	56	Qualification to Champions League third qualifying round
4	Bordeaux	34	15	9	10	52	40	+12	54	Qualification to UEFA Cup first round
5	Lens	34	14	7	13	42	41	+1	49	Qualification to Intertoto Cup third round
6	Saint-Étienne	34	13	9	12	46	47	−1	48	
7	Sedan	34	13	9	12	43	44	−1	48	Qualification to Intertoto Cup second round

Source: Ligue 1
Rules for classification: 1) points; 2) goal difference; 3) number of goals scored.

==== Results summary ====
Overall								Home						Away					
Pld	W	D	L	GF	GA	GD	Pts	W	D	L	GF	GA	GD	W	D	L	GF	GA	GD
34	14	7	13	42	41	+1	49	9	3	5	28	19	+9	5	4	8	14	22	−8

Last updated: 4 May 2002.
Source: Ligue 1

==== Results by round ====
Round	1	2	3	4	5	6	7	8	9	10	11	12	13	14	15	16	17	18	19	20	21	22	23	24	25	26	27	28	29	30	31	32	33	34
Ground	A	H	A	H	A	H	A	H	A	A	H	A	H	A	H	A	H	A	H	A	H	A	H	A	H	H	A	H	A	H	A	H	A	H
Result	L	W	W	D	L	L	D	L	L	L	W	W	D	D	W	L	D	L	L	W	L	D	W	W	W	W	D	L	L	W	L	W	W	W
Position	15	9	4	5	9	14	12	16	17	18	17	13	13	13	12	14	13	15	16	16	16	16	14	12	10	6	8	9	12	11	11	9	7	5

Source: Ligue 1
A = Away; H = Home; W = Win; D = Draw; L = Loss

=== UEFA Cup ===
==== First round ====
16 September 1999 First leg	Maccabi Tel Aviv (Israel)	2–2	(France) Lens	Ramat Gan, Israel
17:00	Kubica 43'; Dayan 75'	Report	Sakho 38'; Job 55'	Stadium: Ramat Gan Stadium; Attendance: 4,500; Referee: Ivan Dobrinov (Bulgaria)

30 September 1999 Second leg	Lens (France)	4–1 (4–3 agg.)	(Israel) Maccabi Tel Aviv	Lens, France
18:00	Nouma 77'; Delporte 80'	Report	Basis 24'	Stadium: Stade Félix-Bollaert; Attendance: 35,663; Referee: Manuel Mejuto González (Spain)

==== Second round ====
28 October 1999 First leg	Lens (France)	4–1	(Netherlands) Vitesse	Lens, France
20:45	Brunel 3'; Nouma 17'; Nyarko 76'; Blanchard 87'	Report	van Hooijdonk 73'	Stadium: Stade Félix-Bollaert; Attendance: 36,326; Referee: Siarhei Shmolik (Belarus)

4 November 1999 Second leg	Vitesse (Netherlands)	1–1 (2–5 agg.)	(France) Lens	Arnhem, Netherlands
20:00	Kreek 64'	Report	Blanchard 90'	Stadium: GelreDome; Attendance: 13,000; Referee: Bernhard Brugger (Austria)

==== Third round ====
25 November 1999 First leg	Lens (France)	1–2	(Germany) Kaiserslautern	Lens, France
18:00	Schjønberg 85' (o.g.)	Report	Sikora 32' (o.g.); Wagner 38'	Stadium: Stade Félix-Bollaert; Attendance: 36,243; Referee: Alfredo Trentalange (Italy)

9 December 1999 Second leg	Kaiserslautern (Germany)	1–4 (3–5 agg.)	(France) Lens	Kaiserslautern, Germany
18:00	Hristov 21'	Report	Job 20', 39'; Strasser 55' (o.g.); Nyarko 90'	Stadium: Fritz-Walter-Stadion; Attendance: 25,000; Referee: Sándor Puhl (Hungary)

==== Fourth round ====
2 March 2000 First leg	Atlético Madrid (Spain)	2–2	(France) Lens	Madrid, Spain
20:15	Hasselbaink 23', 78'	Report	Dacourt 15', 77'	Stadium: Vicente Calderón Stadium; Attendance: 15,000; Referee: Kyros Vassaras (Greece)

9 March 2000 Second leg	Lens (France)	4–2 (6–4 agg.)	(Spain) Atlético Madrid	Lens, France
21:00	Nouma 29', 53'; Sakho 37'; Brunel 71'	Report	Hasselbaink 45'; Kiko 65'	Stadium: Stade Félix-Bollaert; Attendance: 37,229; Referee: Nikolai Levnikov (Russia)

==== Quarter-finals ====
16 March 2000 First leg	Celta Vigo (Spain)	0–0	(France) Lens	Vigo, Spain
21:30		Report		Stadium: Balaídos; Attendance: 27,000; Referee: Karl-Erik Nilsson (Sweden)

23 March 2000 Second leg	Lens (France)	2–1 (2–1 agg.)	(Spain) Celta Vigo	Lens, France
20:45	Ismaël 62' (pen.); Nouma 72'	Report	Revivo 56'	Stadium: Stade Félix-Bollaert; Attendance: 41,000; Referee: Paul Durkin (England)

==== Semi-finals ====
6 April 2000 First leg	Arsenal (England)	1–0	(France) Lens	London, England
20:00	Bergkamp 2'	Report		Stadium: Arsenal Stadium; Attendance: 38,102; Referee: Günter Benkö (Austria)

20 April 2000 Second leg	Lens (France)	1–2 (1–3 agg.)	(England) Arsenal	Lens, France
20:45	Nouma 73'	Report	Henry 41'; Kanu 87'	Stadium: Stade Félix-Bollaert; Attendance: 41,043; Referee: José María García-Aranda (Spain)
