= Viking FK in European football =

- Club: Viking FK
- First entry: 1972–73 UEFA Cup
- Latest entry: 2026–27 UEFA Champions League

Viking Fotballklubb is a Norwegian football club from the city of Stavanger. It has participated in the UEFA Cup and UEFA Europa League 12 seasons, the European Cup and UEFA Champions League 8 seasons and the European Cup Winners' Cup 1 season.

== Overall record ==
As of 21 October 2026

| Competition | Played | Won | Drew | Lost | GF | GA | GD | Win% |
|---|---|---|---|---|---|---|---|---|
| European Cup / UEFA Champions League | 19 | 2 | 4 | 13 | 21 | 41 | −20 | 10.53 |
| UEFA Cup / UEFA Europa League | 51 | 20 | 12 | 19 | 69 | 63 | +6 | 39.22 |
| UEFA Conference League | 10 | 5 | 2 | 3 | 24 | 14 | +10 | 50.00 |
| European Cup Winners' Cup | 2 | 0 | 0 | 2 | 0 | 5 | −5 | 0.00 |
| Total | 82 | 27 | 18 | 37 | 114 | 123 | −9 | 32.93 |

== Results ==
Notes

- PR: Preliminary round
- 1Q: First qualifying round
- 2Q: Second qualifying round
- 1R: First round
- 2R: Second round
- GS: Group stage
- LP: League phase

| Season | Competition | Round | Opponent | Home | Away | Aggregate |
|---|---|---|---|---|---|---|
| 1972–73 | UEFA Cup | 1R | (Iceland) ÍBV | 1–0 | 0–0 | 1–0 |
| 1972–73 | UEFA Cup | 2R | (West Germany) 1. FC Köln | 1–0 | 1–9 | 2–9 |
| 1973–74 | European Cup | 1R | (Czechoslovakia) Spartak Trnava | 1–2 | 0–1 | 1–3 |
| 1974–75 | European Cup | 1R | (Soviet Union) Ararat Yerevan | 0–2 | 2–4 | 2–6 |
| 1975–76 | European Cup | 1R | (Belgium) Molenbeek | 0–1 | 2–3 | 2–4 |
| 1976–77 | European Cup | 1R | (Czechoslovakia) Baník Ostrava | 2–1 | 0–2 | 2–3 |
| 1979–80 | UEFA Cup | 1R | (West Germany) Borussia Mönchengladbach | 1–1 | 0–3 | 1–4 |
| 1980–81 | European Cup | 1R | (Socialist Federal Republic of Yugoslavia) Red Star Belgrade | 2–3 | 1–4 | 3–7 |
| 1982–83 | UEFA Cup | 1R | (East Germany) Lokomotive Leipzig | 1–0 | 2–3 | 3–3 (a) |
| 1982–83 | UEFA Cup | 2R | (Scotland) Dundee United | 1–3 | 0–0 | 1–3 |
| 1983–84 | European Cup | 1R | (Socialist Federal Republic of Yugoslavia) Partizan | 0–0 | 1–5 | 1–5 |
| 1985–86 | UEFA Cup | 1R | (Poland) Legia Warsaw | 1–1 | 0–3 | 1–4 |
| 1990–91 | European Cup Winners' Cup | 1R | (Belgium) Liège | 0–2 | 0–3 | 0–5 |
| 1992–93 | UEFA Champions League | 1R | (Spain) Barcelona | 0–0 | 0–1 | 0–1 |
| 1995–96 | UEFA Cup | PR | (Finland) TPV Tampere | 3–1 | 4–0 | 7–1 |
| 1995–96 | UEFA Cup | 1R | (France) Auxerre | 1–1 | 0–1 | 1–2 |
| 1997–98 | UEFA Cup | 1Q | (Federal Republic of Yugoslavia) Vojvodina | 0–2 | 2–0 | 2–2 (5–4 p) |
| 1997–98 | UEFA Cup | 2Q | (Switzerland) Neuchâtel Xamax | 2–1 | 0–3 | 2–4 |
| 1999–2000 | UEFA Cup | 1Q | (Andorra) Principat | 7–0 | 11–0 | 18–0 |
| 1999–2000 | UEFA Cup | 1R | (Portugal) Sporting CP | 3–0 | 0–1 | 3–1 |
| 1999–2000 | UEFA Cup | 2R | (Germany) Werder Bremen | 2–2 | 0–0 | 2–2 (a) |
| 2001–02 | UEFA Cup | 1Q | (Bosnia and Herzegovina) Brotnjo | 1–0 | 1–1 | 2–1 |
| 2001–02 | UEFA Cup | 1R | (Scotland) Kilmarnock | 2–0 | 1–1 | 3–1 |
| 2001–02 | UEFA Cup | 2R | (Germany) Hertha BSC | 0–1 | 0–2 | 0–3 |
| 2002–03 | UEFA Cup | 1R | (England) Chelsea | 4–2 | 1–2 | 5–4 |
| 2002–03 | UEFA Cup | 2R | (Spain) Celta Vigo | 1–1 | 0–3 | 1–4 |
| 2005–06 | UEFA Cup | 1Q | (Northern Ireland) Portadown | 1–0 | 2–1 | 3–1 |
| 2005–06 | UEFA Cup | 2Q | (Wales) Rhyl | 2–1 | 1–0 | 3–1 |
| 2005–06 | UEFA Cup | 1R | Austria Wien | 1–0 | 1–2 | 2–2 (a) |
| 2005–06 | UEFA Cup | GS | (France) Monaco | 1–0 | —N/a | 4th |
| 2005–06 | UEFA Cup | GS | (Germany) Hamburg | —N/a | 0–2 | 4th |
| 2005–06 | UEFA Cup | GS | (Czech Republic) Slavia Prague | 2–2 | —N/a | 4th |
| 2005–06 | UEFA Cup | GS | (Bulgaria) CSKA Sofia | —N/a | 0–2 | 4th |
| 2008–09 | UEFA Cup | 1Q | (Lithuania) Vėtra | 2–0 | 0–1 | 2–1 |
| 2008–09 | UEFA Cup | 2Q | (Finland) Honka | 1–2 | 0–0 | 1–2 |
| 2020–21 | UEFA Europa League | 2Q | (Scotland) Aberdeen | 0–2 | —N/a | —N/a |
| 2022–23 | UEFA Europa Conference League | 2Q | (Czech Republic) Sparta Prague | 2–1 | 0–0 | 2–1 |
| 2022–23 | UEFA Europa Conference League | 3Q | (Republic of Ireland) Sligo Rovers | 5–1 | 0–1 | 5–2 |
| 2022–23 | UEFA Europa Conference League | PO | (Romania) FCSB | 1–3 | 2–1 | 3–4 |
| 2025–26 | UEFA Conference League | 2Q | (Slovenia) Koper | 7–0 | 5–3 | 12–3 |
| 2025–26 | UEFA Conference League | 3Q | (Turkey) İstanbul Başakşehir | 1–3 | 1–1 | 2–4 |
| 2026–27 | UEFA Champions League | PO | (Croatia) Dinamo Zagreb | 3–1 | 2–2 | 5–3 |
| 2026–27 | UEFA Champions League | LP | (Germany) VfB Stuttgart | —N/a | 1–3 | |
| 2026–27 | UEFA Champions League | LP | (Germany) Bayern Munich | 3–3 | —N/a | |
| 2026–27 | UEFA Champions League | LP | (England) Aston Villa | —N/a | 1–3 | |
| 2026–27 | UEFA Champions League | LP | (Azerbaijan) Sabah | | —N/a | |
| 2026–27 | UEFA Champions League | LP | (Spain) Atlético Madrid | —N/a | | |
| 2026–27 | UEFA Champions League | LP | (Netherlands) Feyenoord | | —N/a | |
| 2026–27 | UEFA Champions League | LP | (Netherlands) PSV Eindhoven | | —N/a | |
| 2026–27 | UEFA Champions League | LP | (Italy) Napoli | —N/a | | |
