= 1999–2000 UEFA Cup qualifying round =

The qualifying round matches of the 1999–2000 UEFA Cup were played on 12 and 26 August 2000. The round consisted of 38 matches.

== Teams ==
The following 76 teams participated in the qualifying round.

Key to colours
Winners of qualifying round advanced to first round

Qualifying round participants

Team	Coeff.
(Russia) Lokomotiv Moscow	43.912
(Belgium) Club Brugge	40.800
(Romania) Steaua București	31.100
(Switzerland) Grasshopper	30.000
(Sweden) IFK Göteborg	29.662
(Belgium) Anderlecht	26.800
(Hungary) Ferencváros	23.833
(Poland) Legia Warsaw	20.625
(Croatia) Hajduk Split	20.187
(Scotland) Celtic	19.312
(Austria) GAK	19.187
(Switzerland) Zürich	18.000
(Sweden) Helsingborgs IF	15.662
(Ukraine) Shakhtar Donetsk	14.145
(Czech Republic) Sigma Olomouc	12.812
(Norway) Bodø/Glimt	11.866
(Denmark) Lyngby	11.525
(Norway) Viking	10.866
(Finland) HJK	10.520

Team	Coeff.
(Slovenia) Olimpija Ljubljana	10.415
(Turkey) Ankaragücü	10.175
(Ukraine) Kryvbas Kryvyi Rih	10.145
(Federal Republic of Yugoslavia) Red Star Belgrade	10.124
(Scotland) Kilmarnock	9.312
(Slovakia) Spartak Trnava	9.166
(Romania) Dinamo București	9.100
(Hungary) Újpest	8.833
(Poland) Lech Poznań	8.625
(Cyprus) APOEL	8.332
(Scotland) St Johnstone	8.312
(Israel) Maccabi Tel Aviv	7.770
(Slovakia) Inter Slovnaft Bratislava	7.166
(Cyprus) Omonia	6.332
(Georgia (country)) Torpedo Kutaisi	6.083
(Georgia (country)) Locomotive Tbilisi	6.083
(Bulgaria) CSKA Sofia	5.791
(Israel) Hapoel Tel Aviv	5.770
(Slovenia) HIT Gorica	5.415

Team	Coeff.
(Belarus) Belshina Bobruisk	4.541
(Belarus) BATE Borisov	4.541
(Finland) VPS	4.520
(Latvia) Liepājas Metalurgs	4.291
(Iceland) KR	4.166
(Federal Republic of Yugoslavia) Vojvodina	4.124
(Bulgaria) Levski Sofia	3.791
(North Macedonia) Vardar	3.457
(Latvia) Rīga	3.291
(Iceland) Leiftur	3.166
(North Macedonia) Sileks	2.457
(Lithuania) Kareda	2.416
(Lithuania) Kaunas	2.416
(Moldova) Sheriff Tiraspol	2.166
(Moldova) Constructorul Chișinău	2.166
(Northern Ireland) Linfield	1.999
(Estonia) Viljandi Tulevik	1.291
(Estonia) Levadia Maardu	1.291
(Estonia) Lantana	1.291

Team	Coeff.
(Armenia) Yerevan	1.208
(Armenia) Shirak	1.208
(Northern Ireland) Portadown	0.999
(Wales) Inter Cardiff	0.916
(Wales) Cwmbrân Town	0.916
(Republic of Ireland) Bray Wanderers	0.916
(Republic of Ireland) Cork City	0.916
(Malta) Birkirkara	0.749
(Malta) Sliema Wanderers	0.749
(Faroe Islands) KÍ	0.624
(Faroe Islands) B36	0.624
(Albania) Vllaznia	0.583
(Albania) Bylis	0.583
(Luxembourg) Mondercange	0.583
(Luxembourg) F91 Dudelange	0.583
(Liechtenstein) Vaduz	0.500
(Azerbaijan) Neftçi	0.458
(Azerbaijan) Shamkir	0.458
(Andorra) Principat	0.000

Notes

1. ^{FP} Qualified via the Fair Play ranking

== Seeding ==
The seeding groups were as follows:

Group 1		Group 2		Group 3		Group 4	
Seeded	Unseeded	Seeded	Unseeded	Seeded	Unseeded	Seeded	Unseeded
(Belgium) Anderlecht; (Austria) GAK; (Denmark) Lyngby; (Slovenia) HIT Gorica	(Iceland) Leiftur; (Wales) Inter Cardiff; (Malta) Birkirkara; (Faroe Islands) KÍ	(Belgium) Club Brugge; (Norway) Viking; (Cyprus) Omonia; (Israel) Hapoel Tel Aviv	(Belarus) Belshina Bobruisk; (Estonia) Viljandi Tulevik; (Armenia) Yerevan; (Andorra) Principat	(Romania) Steaua București; (Ukraine) Kryvbas Kryvyi Rih; (Scotland) St Johnstone; (Bulgaria) CSKA Sofia	(Finland) VPS; (Estonia) Levadia Maardu; (Northern Ireland) Portadown; (Azerbaijan) Shamkir	(Switzerland) Grasshopper; (Federal Republic of Yugoslavia) Red Star Belgrade; (Poland) Lech Poznań; (Georgia (country)) Torpedo Kutaisi	(Latvia) Liepājas Metalurgs; (Estonia) Lantana; (Republic of Ireland) Bray Wanderers; (Azerbaijan) Neftçi
Group 5		Group 6		Group 7		Group 8	
Seeded	Unseeded	Seeded	Unseeded	Seeded	Unseeded	Seeded	Unseeded
(Sweden) IFK Göteborg; (Norway) Bodø/Glimt; (Scotland) Kilmarnock; (Georgia (country)) Locomotive Tbilisi	(Iceland) KR; (Northern Ireland) Linfield; (Republic of Ireland) Cork City; (Liechtenstein) Vaduz	(Scotland) Celtic; (Czech Republic) Sigma Olomouc; (Slovakia) Spartak Trnava; (Hungary) Újpest	(Federal Republic of Yugoslavia) Vojvodina; (Moldova) Sheriff Tiraspol; (Wales) Cwmbrân Town; (Albania) Vllaznia	(Hungary) Ferencváros; (Ukraine) Shakhtar Donetsk; (Romania) Dinamo București; (Cyprus) APOEL	(Bulgaria) Levski Sofia; (North Macedonia) Sileks; (Moldova) Constructorul Chișinău; (Luxembourg) Mondercange	(Poland) Legia Warsaw; (Sweden) Helsingborgs IF; (Turkey) Ankaragücü; (Slovakia) Inter Slovnaft Bratislava	(North Macedonia) Vardar; (Latvia) Rīga; (Faroe Islands) B36; (Albania) Bylis
Group 9		Group 10					
Seeded	Unseeded	Seeded	Unseeded				
(Croatia) Hajduk Split; (Switzerland) Zürich; (Israel) Maccabi Tel Aviv	(Lithuania) Kaunas; (Malta) Sliema Wanderers; (Luxembourg) F91 Dudelange	(Russia) Lokomotiv Moscow; (Finland) HJK; (Slovenia) Olimpija Ljubljana	(Belarus) BATE Borisov; (Lithuania) Kareda; (Armenia) Shirak				

== Summary ==
Team 1	Agg.	Team 2	1st leg	2nd leg
Shakhtar Donetsk (Ukraine)	4–3	(North Macedonia) Sileks	3–1	1–2
HJK (Finland)	2–1 (Note: Order of legs reversed)	(Armenia) Shirak	2–0	0–1
Locomotive Tbilisi (Georgia (country))	2–1	(Northern Ireland) Linfield	1–0	1–1
Sheriff Tiraspol (Moldova)	1–1 (a)	(Czech Republic) Sigma Olomouc	1–1	0–0
Yerevan (Armenia)	1–4	(Israel) Hapoel Tel Aviv	0–2	1–2
Neftçi (Azerbaijan)	2–4	(Federal Republic of Yugoslavia) Red Star Belgrade	2–3	0–1
Vllaznia (Albania)	1–3	(Slovakia) Spartak Trnava	1–1	0–2
BATE Borisov (Belarus)	1–12	(Russia) Lokomotiv Moscow	1–7	0–5
Lantana (Estonia)	2–9	(Georgia (country)) Torpedo Kutaisi	0–5	2–4
Liepājas Metalurgs (Latvia)	4–5	(Poland) Lech Poznań	3–2	1–3
HIT Gorica (Slovenia)	2–1	(Wales) Inter Cardiff	2–0	0–1
Vojvodina (Federal Republic of Yugoslavia)	5–1	(Hungary) Újpest	4–0	1–1
Viljandi Tulevik (Estonia)	0–5	(Belgium) Club Brugge	0–3	0–2
Belshina Bobruisk (Belarus)	1–8	(Cyprus) Omonia	1–5	0–3
Kryvbas Kryvyi Rih (Ukraine)	5–0	(Azerbaijan) Shamkir	3–0	2–0
KÍ (Faroe Islands)	0–9	(Austria) GAK	0–5	0–4
Rīga (Latvia)	0–5	(Sweden) Helsingborgs IF	0–0	0–5
VPS (Finland)	1–3	(Scotland) St Johnstone	1–1	0–2
Inter Slovnaft Bratislava (Slovakia)	5–1	(Albania) Bylis	3–1	2–0
Bodø/Glimt (Norway)	3–1	(Liechtenstein) Vaduz	1–0	2–1
Viking (Norway)	18–0	(Andorra) Principat	7–0	11–0
Maccabi Tel Aviv (Israel)	4–3	(Lithuania) Kaunas	3–1	1–2
Steaua București (Romania)	7–1	(Estonia) Levadia Maardu	3–0	4–1
Lyngby (Denmark)	7–0	(Malta) Birkirkara	7–0	0–0
Ankaragücü (Turkey)	2–0	(Faroe Islands) B36	1–0	1–0
Sliema Wanderers (Malta)	0–4	(Switzerland) Zürich	0–3	0–1
Grasshopper (Switzerland)	8–0	(Republic of Ireland) Bray Wanderers	4–0	4–0
IFK Göteborg (Sweden)	3–1	(Republic of Ireland) Cork City	3–0	0–1
Mondercange (Luxembourg)	2–13	(Romania) Dinamo București	2–6	0–7
Vardar (North Macedonia)	0–9	(Poland) Legia Warsaw	0–5	0–4
APOEL (Cyprus)	0–2	(Bulgaria) Levski Sofia	0–0	0–2
Anderlecht (Belgium)	9–1	(Iceland) Leiftur	6–1	3–0
Olimpija Ljubljana (Slovenia)	3–3 (a)	(Lithuania) Kareda	1–1	2–2
Hajduk Split (Croatia)	6–1	(Luxembourg) F91 Dudelange	5–0	1–1
Cwmbrân Town (Wales)	0–10	(Scotland) Celtic	0–6	0–4
Portadown (Northern Ireland)	0–8	(Bulgaria) CSKA Sofia	0–3	0–5
Ferencváros (Hungary)	4–2	(Moldova) Constructorul Chișinău	3–1	1–1
KR (Iceland)	1–2	(Scotland) Kilmarnock	1–0	0–2 (a.e.t.)

== Matches ==
10 August 1999
18:00

Shakhtar Donetsk (Ukraine)	3–1	(North Macedonia) Sileks
Seleznyov 60'; Štolcers 80', 89'	Report	Gjokić 90'

Shakhtar Stadium, Donetsk
Attendance: 7,881
Referee: Jørn West Larsen (Denmark)
26 August 1999
16:30

Sileks (North Macedonia)	2–1	(Ukraine) Shakhtar Donetsk
Ignatov 20' (pen.); Simovski 66'	Report	Seleznyov 60'

Stadion Sileks, Kratovo
Attendance: 1,500
Referee: Costas Kapitanis (Cyprus)

Shakhtar Donetsk won 4–3 on aggregate.

11 August 1999
18:00

HJK (Finland)	2–0	(Armenia) Shirak
Rafael 21'; Ilola 70'	Report

Olympic Stadium, Helsinki
Attendance: 4,102
Referee: Oleg Timofejev (Estonia)
26 August 1999
15:00

Shirak (Armenia)	1–0	(Finland) HJK
Bernetsyan 28'	Report

Hrazdan Stadium, Yerevan
Attendance: 2,600
Referee: John Rowbotham (Scotland)

HJK won 2–1 on aggregate.

12 August 1999
16:00

Locomotive Tbilisi (Georgia (country))	1–0	(Northern Ireland) Linfield
Kebadze 22'	Report

Mikheil Meskhi Stadium, Tbilisi
Attendance: 5,000
Referee: Eduardo Iturralde González (Spain)
26 August 1999
20:30

Linfield (Northern Ireland)	1–1	(Georgia (country)) Locomotive Tbilisi
Larmour 57'	Report	Kebadze 80'

Windsor Park, Belfast
Attendance: 3,600
Referee: Domenico Messina (Italy)

Locomotive Tbilisi won 2–1 on aggregate.

12 August 1999
16:00

Sheriff Tiraspol (Moldova)	1–1	(Czech Republic) Sigma Olomouc
Mujiri 10'	Report	Kováč 20'

Stadionul Municipal, Tiraspol
Attendance: 4,000
Referee: Valeriy Onufer (Ukraine)
26 August 1999
20:00

Sigma Olomouc (Czech Republic)	0–0	(Moldova) Sheriff Tiraspol
	Report

Andrův stadion, Olomouc
Attendance: 6,371
Referee: Metin Tokat (Turkey)

1–1 on aggregate; Sigma Olomouc won on away goals.

12 August 1999
16:00

Yerevan (Armenia)	0–2	(Israel) Hapoel Tel Aviv
	Report	Harazi 55', 58'

Hrazdan Stadium, Yerevan
Attendance: 800
Referee: Wolfgang Sowa (Austria)
26 August 1999
19:15

Hapoel Tel Aviv (Israel)	2–1	(Armenia) Yerevan
Pisont 78'; Antebi 90'	Report	Gogoladze 50'

Bloomfield Stadium, Tel Aviv
Attendance: 15,000
Referee: Bruno Coué (France)

Hapoel Tel Aviv won 4–1 on aggregate.

12 August 1999
16:00

Neftçi (Azerbaijan)	2–3	(Federal Republic of Yugoslavia) Red Star Belgrade
Vasilyev 27', 65'	Report	Bošković 68'; Pjanović 69'; Pantelić 70'

Tofiq Bahramov Republican Stadium, Baku
Attendance: 3,500
Referee: Jonny Ditlefsen (Norway)
26 August 1999
18:00

Red Star Belgrade (Federal Republic of Yugoslavia)	1–0	(Azerbaijan) Neftçi
Pantelić 76'	Report

Red Star Stadium, Belgrade
Attendance: 8,000
Referee: Dominique Tavel (Switzerland)

Red Star Belgrade won 4–2 on aggregate.

12 August 1999
17:00

Vllaznia (Albania)	1–1	(Slovakia) Spartak Trnava
Sinani 43'	Report	Leitner 28'

Qemal Stafa Stadium, Tirana
Attendance: 2,500
Referee: Peter Jones (England)
26 August 1999
19:00

Spartak Trnava (Slovakia)	2–0	(Albania) Vllaznia
Ujlaky 48', 89'	Report

Štadión Antona Malatinského, Trnava
Attendance: 5,435
Referee: Marcel Lica (Romania)

Spartak Trnava won 3–1 on aggregate.

12 August 1999
17:00

BATE Borisov (Belarus)	1–7	(Russia) Lokomotiv Moscow
Lisovskiy 72'	Report	Z. Janashia 6', 34', 60'; Loskov 24'; Sarkisyan 55'; Bulykin 73', 86'

City Stadium, Borisov
Attendance: 5,500
Referee: Eric Poulat (France)
25 August 1999
17:00

Lokomotiv Moscow (Russia)	5–0	(Belarus) BATE Borisov
Chugainov 17'; Loskov 23'; Smertin 36'; Kharlachev 66', 75'	Report

Lokomotiv Stadium, Moscow
Attendance: 3,000
Referee: Sándor Puhl (Hungary)

Lokomotiv Moscow won 12–1 on aggregate.

12 August 1999
17:00

Lantana (Estonia)	0–5	(Georgia (country)) Torpedo Kutaisi
	Report	Khvadagiani 2'; D. Janashia 33'; Ionanidze 38'; Shkhetiani 55'; Megreladze 66'

Kadriorg Stadium, Tallinn
Attendance: 390
Referee: Zdravko Savić (FR Yugoslavia)
26 August 1999
14:30

Torpedo Kutaisi (Georgia (country))	4–2	(Estonia) Lantana
Ionanidze 11'; Megreladze 27', 31', 73'	Report	Leitan 37'; Dolinin 56'

Central Stadium, Kutaisi
Attendance: 1,020
Referee: Petteri Kari (Finland)

Torpedo Kutaisi won 9–2 on aggregate.

12 August 1999
15:30

Liepājas Metalurgs (Latvia)	3–2	(Poland) Lech Poznań
Bulders 36'; Verpakovskis 53'; Draguns 62'	Report	Żurawski 24'; Najewski 59'

Skonto Stadium, Riga
Attendance: 4,300
Referee: Oleg Chykun (Belarus)
26 August 1999
17:00

Lech Poznań (Poland)	3–1	(Latvia) Liepājas Metalurgs
Goliński 55'; Kubicki 71'; Maćkiewicz 79'	Report	Bulders 87'

Stadion Poznań, Poznań
Attendance: 5,466
Referee: Muhittin Bosat (Turkey)

Lech Poznań won 5–4 on aggregate.

12 August 1999
17:00

HIT Gorica (Slovenia)	2–0	(Wales) Inter Cardiff
Mitrakovič 75'; Žlogar 83'	Report

Nova Gorica Sports Park, Nova Gorica
Attendance: 1,100
Referee: Ivan Dobrinov (Bulgaria)
26 August 1999
20:30

Inter Cardiff (Wales)	1–0	(Slovenia) HIT Gorica
Mainwaring 57'	Report

Cardiff Athletics Stadium, Cardiff
Attendance: 441
Referee: Alfred Micallef (Malta)

HIT Gorica won 2–1 on aggregate.

12 August 1999
18:00

Vojvodina (Federal Republic of Yugoslavia)	4–0	(Hungary) Újpest
Šuškavčević 5'; Janković 18' (pen.), 47' (pen.); Jović 62'	Report

Karađorđe Stadium, Novi Sad
Attendance: 3,500
Referee: Roy Helge Olsen (Norway)
26 August 1999
20:00

Újpest (Hungary)	1–1	(Federal Republic of Yugoslavia) Vojvodina
Z. Kovács 56'	Report	Bratić 87'

Ferenc Szusza Stadium, Budapest
Attendance: 950
Referee: Konrad Plautz (Austria)

Vojvodina won 5–1 on aggregate.

12 August 1999
18:00

Viljandi Tulevik (Estonia)	0–3	(Belgium) Club Brugge
	Report	Deflandre 50'; Jankauskas 58', 70'

Keskstaadion, Valga
Attendance: 364
Referee: Lassin Isaksen (Faroe Islands)
26 August 1999
20:30

Club Brugge (Belgium)	2–0	(Estonia) Viljandi Tulevik
Jankauskas 47'; De Brul 59'	Report

Olympiastadion, Brugge
Attendance: 1,607
Referee: Georgios Kasnaferis (Greece)

Club Brugge won 5–0 on aggregate.

12 August 1999
18:00

Belshina Bobruisk (Belarus)	1–5	(Cyprus) Omonia
Khripach 21'	Report	Kalotheou 8'; Mihajlović 26'; Rauffmann 34'; Kaiafas 55'; Constantinides 89'

Dinamo Stadium, Minsk
Attendance: 3,300
Referee: Krzysztof Slupik (Poland)
26 August 1999
19:15

Omonia (Cyprus)	3–0	(Belarus) Belshina Bobruisk
Rauffmann 64', 68', 74'	Report

Makario Stadium, Nicosia
Attendance: 6,056
Referee: Brian Lawlor (Wales)

Omonia won 8–1 on aggregate.

12 August 1999
18:00

Kryvbas Kryvyi Rih (Ukraine)	3–0	(Azerbaijan) Shamkir
Ponomarenko 9'; Palyanytsya 65'; Moroz 76'	Report

Metalurh Stadium, Kryvyi Rih
Attendance: 14,700
Referee: Srečko Kandare (Slovenia)
24 August 1999
16:00

Shamkir (Azerbaijan)	0–2	(Ukraine) Kryvbas Kryvyi Rih
	Report	Simakov 24', 70'

Tofiq Bahramov Republican Stadium, Baku (Note: Shamkir played their home match at Tofiq Bahramov Republican Stadium, Baku, instead of their regular stadium Shamkir City Stadium, Şəmkir, as it did not meet UEFA requirements.)
Attendance: 4,000
Referee: Hermann Albrecht (Germany)

Kryvbas Kryvyi Rih won 5–0 on aggregate.

12 August 1999
18:00

KÍ (Faroe Islands)	0–5	(Austria) GAK
	Report	Radovic 7', 37'; Standfest 9', 86', 90'

Svangaskarð, Toftir
Attendance: 763
Referee: Jouni Hyytiä (Finland)
26 August 1999
18:00

GAK (Austria)	4–0	(Faroe Islands) KÍ
Ramusch 47'; Akwuegbu 73'; Dmitrović 81'; Adu 88'	Report

Arnold Schwarzenegger Stadium, Graz
Attendance: 9,800
Referee: Asim Khudiev (Azerbaijan)

GAK won 9–0 on aggregate.

12 August 1999
18:00

Rīga (Latvia)	0–0	(Sweden) Helsingborgs IF
	Report

Daugava Stadium, Liepāja
Attendance: 340
Referee: Otar Guntadze (Georgia)
26 August 1999
19:00

Helsingborgs IF (Sweden)	5–0	(Latvia) Rīga
C. Andersson 4'; Jonson 15'; Powell 42'; Prica 65'; Bakkerud 83'	Report

Olympia, Helsingborg
Attendance: 2,600
Referee: Steve Dunn (England)

Helsingborgs IF won 5–0 on aggregate.

12 August 1999
18:30

VPS (Finland)	1–1	(Scotland) St Johnstone
Pohja 41'	Report	Lowndes 76'

Hietalahti, Vaasa
Attendance: 1,512
Referee: Iouri Baskakov (Russia)
26 August 1999
20:45

St Johnstone (Scotland)	2–0	(Finland) VPS
Simão 87', 90'	Report

McDiarmid Park, Perth
Attendance: 4,762
Referee: Juan Manuel Brito Arceo (Spain)

St Johnstone won 3–1 on aggregate.

12 August 1999
19:00

Inter Slovnaft Bratislava (Slovakia)	3–1	(Albania) Bylis
Gerich 16'; Kratochvíl 28' (pen.); Perniš 75'	Report	Jakupi 62'

Štadión Pasienky, Bratislava
Attendance: 2,552
Referee: Slavik Kazaryan (Armenia)
26 August 1999
19:30

Bylis (Albania)	0–2	(Slovakia) Inter Slovnaft Bratislava
	Report	Németh 34', 62'

Qemal Stafa Stadium, Tirana
Attendance: 3,000
Referee: Goran Marić (Croatia)

Inter Slovnaft Bratislava won 5–1 on aggregate.

12 August 1999
18:00

Bodø/Glimt (Norway)	1–0	(Liechtenstein) Vaduz
Staurvik 28'	Report

Aspmyra Stadion, Bodø
Attendance: 1,600
Referee: Darius Miezelis (Lithuania)
26 August 1999
19:00

Vaduz (Liechtenstein)	1–2	(Norway) Bodø/Glimt
Wegmann 38'	Report	Sæternes 29', 83'

Rheinpark Stadion, Vaduz
Attendance: 850
Referee: Kevin Parry (Wales)

Bodø/Glimt won 3–1 on aggregate.

12 August 1999
19:00

Viking (Norway)	7–0	(Andorra) Principat
Aarsheim 5'; Svensson 17', 48'; Dadason 40', 72', 82'; Nygaard 64'	Report

Stavanger Stadion, Stavanger
Attendance: 2,090
Referee: Egill Már Markússon (Iceland)
26 August 1999
21:00

Principat (Andorra)	0–11	(Norway) Viking
	Report	Dadason 37', 42'; Berre 43', 61', 75'; Berland 44', 45'; Sanne 62', 65', 67'; Mathiassen 82'

Estadi Comunal, Andorra la Vella
Attendance: 150
Referee: António Manuel Almeida Costa (Portugal)

Viking won 18–0 on aggregate.

12 August 1999
17:30

Maccabi Tel Aviv (Israel)	3–1	(Lithuania) Kaunas
Kubica 13', 34'; Basis 68'	Report	Papečkys 19'

Ramat Gan Stadium, Ramat Gan
Attendance: 5,100
Referee: Jaroslav Jára (Czech Republic)
26 August 1999
17:00

Kaunas (Lithuania)	2–1	(Israel) Maccabi Tel Aviv
Pacevičius 29', 48'	Report	Basis 86'

Darius and Girėnas Stadium, Kaunas
Attendance: 2,200
Referee: Juha Hirviniemi (Finland)

Maccabi Tel Aviv won 4–3 on aggregate.

12 August 1999
19:30

Steaua București (Romania)	3–0	(Estonia) Levadia Maardu
Ilie 40', 90'; Ciocoiu 79'	Report

Stadionul Steaua, Bucharest
Attendance: 5,000
Referee: Eric Blareau (Belgium)
26 August 1999
17:00

Levadia Maardu (Estonia)	1–4	(Romania) Steaua București
Krõlov 29'	Report	Reghecampf 52'; Roşu 69', 80'; Ilie 84'

Kadriorg Stadium, Tallinn
Attendance: 1,200
Referee: Zsolt Szabó (Hungary)

Steaua București won 7–1 on aggregate.

12 August 1999
19:00

Lyngby (Denmark)	7–0	(Malta) Birkirkara
Hermansen 29', 90'; Jensen 33'; Larsen 47'; Magleby 68'; Lüthje 82'; Havlykke 87'	Report

Lyngby Stadion, Lyngby
Attendance: 1,350
Referee: Zbigniew Marczyk (Poland)
26 August 1999
19:30

Birkirkara (Malta)	0–0	(Denmark) Lyngby
	Report

Ta' Qali National Stadium, Ta' Qali
Attendance: 155
Referee: Haim Jakov (Israel)

Lyngby won 7–0 on aggregate.

12 August 1999
19:30

Ankaragücü (Turkey)	1–0	(Faroe Islands) B36
Karaman 16'	Report

19 Mayıs Stadium, Ankara
Attendance: 5,700
Referee: Andreas Schluchter (Switzerland)
26 August 1999
19:30

B36 (Faroe Islands)	0–1	(Turkey) Ankaragücü
	Report	Keles 84'

Gundadalur, Tórshavn
Attendance: 1,100
Referee: Sergejs Braga (Latvia)

Ankaragücü won 2–0 on aggregate.

12 August 1999
19:30

Sliema Wanderers (Malta)	0–3	(Switzerland) Zürich
	Report	Kavelashvili 35'; Bartlett 79'; Keke 90'

Ta' Qali National Stadium, Ta' Qali
Attendance: 365
Referee: Kyros Vassaras (Greece)
26 August 1999
19:30

Zürich (Switzerland)	1–0	(Malta) Sliema Wanderers
Douglas 69'	Report

Letzigrund, Zürich
Attendance: 2,300
Referee: Luan Zylfo (Albania)

Zürich won 4–0 on aggregate.

12 August 1999
19:30

Grasshopper (Switzerland)	4–0	(Republic of Ireland) Bray Wanderers
Chapuisat 30', 62'; Isabella 77', 84'	Report

Hardturm, Zürich
Attendance: 5,600
Referee: Marian Salomir (Romania)
26 August 1999
20:00

Bray Wanderers (Republic of Ireland)	0–4	(Switzerland) Grasshopper
	Report	Tikva 6', 38'; de Napoli 53'; Muff 65'

Tolka Park, Dublin
Attendance: 2,500
Referee: Anton Stredák (Slovakia)

Grasshopper won 8–0 on aggregate.

12 August 1999
19:00

IFK Göteborg (Sweden)	3–0	(Republic of Ireland) Cork City
P. Andersson 36'; Karlsson 74', 87'	Report

Ullevi, Gothenburg
Attendance: 3,278
Referee: Anton Genov (Bulgaria)
26 August 1999
19:00

Cork City (Republic of Ireland)	1–0	(Sweden) IFK Göteborg
Morley 30'	Report

Turners Cross, Cork
Attendance: 3,260
Referee: Philippe Kalt (France)

IFK Göteborg won 3–1 on aggregate.

12 August 1999
19:30

Mondercange (Luxembourg)	2–6	(Romania) Dinamo București
Christophe 38'; Neves 90'	Report	Lupescu 21' (pen.); Petre 28'; Mihalcea 49'; Mutu 51', 78'; Niculae 80'

Stade de la Frontière, Esch-sur-Alzette
Attendance: 850
Referee: Algirdas Dubinskas (Lithuania)
26 August 1999
20:00

Dinamo București (Romania)	7–0	(Luxembourg) Mondercange
Mutu 9', 20'; Niculae 22', 29', 74'; Fogel 71' (o.g.); Petre 89'	Report

Stadionul Dinamo, Bucharest
Attendance: 4,500
Referee: Charles Agius (Malta)

Dinamo București won 13–2 on aggregate.

12 August 1999
18:30

Vardar (North Macedonia)	0–5	(Poland) Legia Warsaw
	Report	Mięciel 9'; Czereszewski 19'; Srutwa 57', 72'; Wroblewski 65'

Gradski stadion, Skopje
Attendance: 4,900
Referee: Karel Vidlak (Czech Republic)
26 August 1999
20:00

Legia Warsaw (Poland)	4–0	(North Macedonia) Vardar
Czereszewski 5'; Karwan 17'; Sokołowski 53'; Mięciel 80'	Report

Polish Army Stadium, Warsaw
Attendance: 2,000
Referee: Hartmut Strampe (Germany)

Legia Warsaw won 9–0 on aggregate.

12 August 1999
19:00

APOEL (Cyprus)	0–0	(Bulgaria) Levski Sofia
	Report

Makario Stadium, Nicosia
Attendance: 4,200
Referee: Michal Beneš (Czech Republic)
26 August 1999
16:30

Levski Sofia (Bulgaria)	2–0	(Cyprus) APOEL
Sirakov 67'; Pažin 75'	Report

Georgi Asparuhov Stadium, Sofia
Attendance: 16,300
Referee: Alan Freeland (Scotland)

Levski Sofia won 2–0 on aggregate.

12 August 1999
20:00

Anderlecht (Belgium)	6–1	(Iceland) Leiftur
Goor 18', 40'; Gunnarsson 39' (o.g.); Zetterberg 52'; Baseggio 55'; Radzinski 66'	Report	De Boeck 25' (o.g.)

Constant Vanden Stock Stadium, Brussels
Attendance: 20,514
Referee: Roland Beck (Liechtenstein)
26 August 1999
19:30

Leiftur (Iceland)	0–3	(Belgium) Anderlecht
	Report	van Diemen 2'; Zetterberg 41', 61'

Akureyrarvöllur, Akureyri
Attendance: 1,300
Referee: Martin Ingvarsson (Sweden)

Anderlecht won 9–1 on aggregate.

12 August 1999
20:00

Olimpija Ljubljana (Slovenia)	1–1	(Lithuania) Kareda
Moro 28'	Report	Fomenka 67'

Bežigrad Stadium, Ljubljana
Attendance: 911
Referee: Ladislav Gádoši (Slovakia)
26 August 1999
15:30

Kareda (Lithuania)	2–2	(Slovenia) Olimpija Ljubljana
Fomenka 67', 70'	Report	Moro 16'; Kmetec 87'

Savivaldybė Stadium, Šiauliai
Attendance: 3,000
Referee: Victor José Esquinas Torres (Spain)

3–3 on aggregate; Olimpija Ljubljana won on away goals.

12 August 1999
20:15

Hajduk Split (Croatia)	5–0	(Luxembourg) F91 Dudelange
Bulat 4'; Baturina 24'; Grdić 57'; Leko 68'; Deranja 90'	Report

Stadion Varteks, Varaždin
Attendance: 4,000
Referee: Kamen Alexiev (Bulgaria)
26 August 1999
18:30

F91 Dudelange (Luxembourg)	1–1	(Croatia) Hajduk Split
Kabongo 49'	Report	Jazić 51'

Stade Jos Nosbaum, Dudelange
Attendance: 1,015
Referee: Khagani Mammadov (Azerbaijan)

Hajduk Split won 6–1 on aggregate.

12 August 1999
20:25

Cwmbrân Town (Wales)	0–6	(Scotland) Celtic
	Report	Berkovic 2'; Tebily 20'; Larsson 32', 61'; Viduka 52'; Brattbakk 84'

Ninian Park, Cardiff
Attendance: 8,920
Referee: Michael Thomas Ross (Northern Ireland)
26 August 1999
20:45

Celtic (Scotland)	4–0	(Wales) Cwmbrân Town
Brattbakk 9'; Smith 60'; Mjällby 66'; Johnson 90'	Report

Celtic Park, Glasgow
Attendance: 46,757
Referee: Paul Mckeon (Republic of Ireland)

Celtic won 10–0 on aggregate.

12 August 1999
20:30

Portadown (Northern Ireland)	0–3	(Bulgaria) CSKA Sofia
	Report	Manchev 1'; Kovačević 78'; Bukarev 85'

Shamrock Park, Portadown
Attendance: 786
Referee: Nicolai Vollquartz (Denmark)
24 August 1999
19:00

CSKA Sofia (Bulgaria)	5–0	(Northern Ireland) Portadown
M. Petkov 14'; Litera 28', 49'; Hristov 61'; Simeonov 78'	Report

Balgarska Armia Stadium, Sofia
Attendance: 7,200
Referee: Yiannakis Kyprianides (Cyprus)

CSKA Sofia won 8–0 on aggregate.

12 August 1999
19:00

Ferencváros (Hungary)	3–1	(Moldova) Constructorul Chișinău
Horváth 35'; Füzi 41'; Kovács 73'	Report	Comleonoc 78'

Üllői úti stadion, Budapest
Attendance: 5,641
Referee: Dejan Delević (FR Yugoslavia)
26 August 1999
16:00

Constructorul Chișinău (Moldova)	1–1	(Hungary) Ferencváros
Zabolotnii 41'	Report	Horváth 39'

Stadionul Republican, Chișinău
Attendance: 2,600
Referee: Mike Riley (England)

Ferencváros won 4–2 on aggregate.

12 August 1999
21:00

KR (Iceland)	1–0	(Scotland) Kilmarnock
Hinriksson 87'	Report

Laugardalsvöllur, Reykjavík
Attendance: 3,000
Referee: Wolfgang Stark (Germany)
26 August 1999
20:45

Kilmarnock (Scotland)	2–0 (a.e.t.)	(Iceland) KR
Wright 90' (pen.); Bagan 92'	Report

Rugby Park, Kilmarnock
Attendance: 11,700
Referee: Livio Bazzoli (Italy)

Kilmarnock won 2–1 on aggregate.
