= Issah =

Issah is a given name. Notable people with the name include:

- Issah Abass (born 1998), Ghanaian professional footballer
- Issah Gabriel Ahmed (born 1982), Ghanaian former professional footballer
- Fuseini Issah (born 1975), Ghanaian politician and member of parliament
- Kamal Issah (born 1992), Ghanaian professional footballer
- Mohammed-Awal Issah (born 1986), Ghanaian former professional footballer
- Issah Mmari (1981–2003), better known by his stage name E-Sir, Kenyan hip hop artist
- Issah Moro (born 1974), Ghanaian retired football forward
- Issah Samir (born 1989), Ghanaian boxer who qualified for the 2008 Summer Olympics
- Issah Yakubu (born 1992), Ghanaian professional footballer
- Zinabu Issah (born 1980), Ghanaian para-athlete
