= 1999–2000 UEFA Cup final phase =

Football tournament knockout stage

The final phase of the 1999–2000 UEFA Cup began on 23 November 1999 with the third round and concluded on 17 May 2000 with the final at the Parken Stadium in Copenhagen, Denmark. A total of 32 teams competed in this phase of the competition.

== Qualified teams ==
The following 32 teams qualified for the final phase of the competition.

Qualified teams

Team	Notes	Coeff.
(Italy) Parma		87.606
(Italy) Juventus		121.606
(Netherlands) Ajax		91.908
(Germany) Borussia Dortmund		84.749
(Spain) Atlético Madrid		67.814
(France) Monaco		63.721
(Russia) Spartak Moscow		62.912
(Italy) Roma		56.606

Team	Notes	Coeff.
(Germany) Bayer Leverkusen		54.749
(France) Lyon		49.721
(Portugal) Benfica		49.358
(France) Nantes		47.721
(Italy) Bologna		44.606
(Spain) Deportivo La Coruña		43.814
(Germany) 1. FC Kaiserslautern		43.749
(Czech Republic) Slavia Prague		42.812

Team	Notes	Coeff.
(Greece) Panathinaikos		41.475
(England) Arsenal		40.144
(England) Newcastle United		39.144
(Spain) Mallorca		38.814
(Greece) AEK Athens		38.475
(Spain) Celta Vigo		36.814
(France) Lens		36.721
(Greece) Olympiacos		36.475

Team	Notes	Coeff.
(Germany) Werder Bremen		35.749
(Italy) Udinese		33.606
(Turkey) Galatasaray		31.175
(Romania) Steaua București		31.100
(Germany) VfL Wolfsburg		22.749
(Scotland) Rangers		22.312
(England) Leeds United		22.144
(Austria) Sturm Graz		21.187

Notes

1. ^{TH} UEFA Cup title holders
2. ^{R2} Winners from the second round
3. ^{CL} Third-placed teams from the Champions League first group stage

== Bracket ==
Third round
(Netherlands) Ajax	0	0	0
(Spain) Mallorca	1	2	3
(Greece) AEK Athens	2	0	2
(France) Monaco	2	1	3
(Scotland) Rangers	2	0	2 (1)
(Germany) Borussia Dortmund (p)	0	2	2 (3)
(Italy) Bologna	1	1	2
(Turkey) Galatasaray	1	2	3
(Italy) Roma	1	0	1
(England) Newcastle United	0	0	0
(Russia) Spartak Moscow	2	0	2
(England) Leeds United (a)	1	1	2
(Czech Republic) Slavia Prague	4	1	5
(Romania) Steaua București	1	1	2
(Italy) Udinese (a)	0	2	2
(Germany) Bayer Leverkusen	1	1	2
(England) Arsenal	3	3	6
(France) Nantes	0	3	3
(Spain) Deportivo La Coruña	4	1	5
(Greece) Panathinaikos	2	1	3
(Italy) Parma (a.e.t.)	2	3	5
(Austria) Sturm Graz	1	3	4
(France) Lyon	3	0	3
(Germany) Werder Bremen	0	4	4
(Greece) Olympiacos	1	2	3
(Italy) Juventus	3	1	4
(Spain) Celta Vigo	7	1	8
(Portugal) Benfica	0	1	1
(Germany) VfL Wolfsburg	2	1	3
(Spain) Atlético Madrid	3	2	5
(France) Lens	1	4	5
(Germany) 1. FC Kaiserslautern	2	1	3

Fourth round
(Spain) Mallorca	4	0	4
(France) Monaco	1	1	2
(Germany) Borussia Dortmund	0	0	0
(Turkey) Galatasaray	2	0	2
(Italy) Roma	0	0	0
(England) Leeds United	0	1	1
(Czech Republic) Slavia Prague (a)	1	1	2
(Italy) Udinese	0	2	2
(England) Arsenal	5	1	6
(Spain) Deportivo La Coruña	1	2	3
(Italy) Parma	1	1	2
(Germany) Werder Bremen	0	3	3
(Italy) Juventus	1	0	1
(Spain) Celta Vigo	0	4	4
(Spain) Atlético Madrid	2	2	4
(France) Lens	2	4	6

Quarter-finals
(Spain) Mallorca	1	1	2
(Turkey) Galatasaray	4	2	6
(England) Leeds United	3	1	4
(Czech Republic) Slavia Prague	0	2	2
(England) Arsenal	2	4	6
(Germany) Werder Bremen	0	2	2
(Spain) Celta Vigo	0	1	1
(France) Lens	0	2	2

Semi-finals
(Turkey) Galatasaray	2	2	4
(England) Leeds United	0	2	2
(England) Arsenal	1	2	3
(France) Lens	0	1	1

Final
17 May – Copenhagen
(Turkey) Galatasaray (p)	0 (4)
(England) Arsenal	0 (1)

== Third round ==
The third round included 24 winners from the second round and eight third-placed teams from the Champions League first group stage.

=== Seeding ===
UEFA allocated the teams into four groups, each with four seeded and four unseeded teams.

Group 1		Group 2		Group 3		Group 4	
Seeded	Unseeded	Seeded	Unseeded	Seeded	Unseeded	Seeded	Unseeded
(Italy) Parma; (France) Lyon; (Italy) Bologna; (Spain) Deportivo La Coruña	(Greece) Panathinaikos; (Germany) Werder Bremen; (Turkey) Galatasaray; (Austria) Sturm Graz	(Netherlands) Ajax; (Russia) Spartak Moscow; (Germany) Bayer Leverkusen; (Germany) 1. FC Kaiserslautern	(Spain) Mallorca; (France) Lens; (Italy) Udinese; (England) Leeds United	(Germany) Borussia Dortmund; (France) Monaco; (Italy) Roma; (Portugal) Benfica	(England) Newcastle United; (Greece) AEK Athens; (Spain) Celta Vigo; (Scotland) Rangers	(Italy) Juventus; (Spain) Atlético Madrid; (France) Nantes; (Czech Republic) Slavia Prague	(England) Arsenal; (Greece) Olympiacos; (Romania) Steaua București; (Germany) VfL Wolfsburg

=== Summary ===
Team 1	Agg.	Team 2	1st leg	2nd leg
Ajax (Netherlands)	0–3	(Spain) Mallorca	0–1	0–2
AEK Athens (Greece)	2–3	(France) Monaco	2–2	0–1
Rangers (Scotland)	2–2 (1–3 p)	(Germany) Borussia Dortmund	2–0	0–2 (a.e.t.)
Bologna (Italy)	2–3	(Turkey) Galatasaray	1–1	1–2
Roma (Italy)	1–0	(England) Newcastle United	1–0	0–0
Spartak Moscow (Russia)	2–2 (a)	(England) Leeds United	2–1	0–1
Slavia Prague (Czech Republic)	5–2	(Romania) Steaua București	4–1	1–1
Udinese (Italy)	2–2 (a)	(Germany) Bayer Leverkusen	0–1	2–1
Arsenal (England)	6–3	(France) Nantes	3–0	3–3
Deportivo La Coruña (Spain)	5–3	(Greece) Panathinaikos	4–2	1–1
Parma (Italy)	5–4	(Austria) Sturm Graz	2–1	3–3 (a.e.t.)
Lyon (France)	3–4	(Germany) Werder Bremen	3–0	0–4
Olympiacos (Greece)	3–4	(Italy) Juventus	1–3	2–1
Celta Vigo (Spain)	8–1	(Portugal) Benfica	7–0	1–1
VfL Wolfsburg (Germany)	3–5	(Spain) Atlético Madrid	2–3	1–2
Lens (France)	5–3	(Germany) 1. FC Kaiserslautern	1–2	4–1

=== Matches ===
25 November 1999
20:30

Ajax (Netherlands)	0–1	(Spain) Mallorca
	Report	Tristán 35'

Amsterdam Arena, Amsterdam
Attendance: 40,123
Referee: Ľuboš Micheľ (Slovakia)
9 December 1999
21:45

Mallorca (Spain)	2–0	(Netherlands) Ajax
Soler 2'; Biagini 70'	Report

Son Moix, Palma
Attendance: 17,567
Referee: Fritz Stuchlik (Austria)

Mallorca won 3–0 on aggregate.

23 November 1999
17:00

AEK Athens (Greece)	2–2	(France) Monaco
Nikolaidis 45', 89'	Report	Giuly 26'; Simone 78'

Nikos Goumas Stadium, Nea Filadelfeia
Attendance: 7,299
Referee: Claus Bo Larsen (Denmark)
9 December 1999
19:30

Monaco (France)	1–0	(Greece) AEK Athens
Simone 32'	Report

Stade Louis II, Monaco
Attendance: 6,600
Referee: Dieter Schoch (Switzerland)

Monaco won 3–2 on aggregate.

25 November 1999
21:30

Rangers (Scotland)	2–0	(Germany) Borussia Dortmund
Kohler 18' (o.g.); Wallace 45'	Report

Ibrox Stadium, Glasgow
Attendance: 49,268
Referee: Urs Meier (Switzerland)
7 December 1999
16:00

Borussia Dortmund (Germany)	2–0 (a.e.t.)	(Scotland) Rangers
Ikpeba 28'; Bobic 90'	Report
Penalties
Bobic (penalty scored); Nijhuis (penalty scored); Nerlinger (penalty missed); Barbarez (penalty scored)	3–1	(penalty scored) Amoruso; (penalty missed) Van Bronckhorst; (penalty missed) Numan; (penalty missed) Reyna

Westfalenstadion, Dortmund
Attendance: 37,000
Referee: Oğuz Sarvan (Turkey)

2–2 on aggregate; Borussia Dortmund won 3–1 on penalties.

23 November 1999
18:00

Bologna (Italy)	1–1	(Turkey) Galatasaray
Signori 66'	Report	Şükür 81'

Stadio Renato Dall'Ara, Bologna
Attendance: 23,792
Referee: Graham Poll (England)
9 December 1999
18:00

Galatasaray (Turkey)	2–1	(Italy) Bologna
Hasan Ş. 5'; Ümit D. 30'	Report	Ventola 8'

Ali Sami Yen Stadium, Istanbul
Attendance: 14,590
Referee: Günter Benkö (Austria)

Galatasaray won 3–2 on aggregate.

25 November 1999
21:15

Roma (Italy)	1–0	(England) Newcastle United
Totti 50' (pen.)	Report

Stadio Olimpico, Rome
Attendance: 45,655
Referee: Claude Colombo (France)
9 December 1999
21:15

Newcastle United (England)	0–0	(Italy) Roma
	Report

St James' Park, Newcastle
Attendance: 35,739
Referee: Hartmut Strampe (Germany)

Roma won 1–0 on aggregate.

2 December 1999 (Note: The Spartak Moscow v Leeds United match, originally scheduled to be played on 25 November 1999 at Central Dynamo Stadium, Moscow, was postponed due to unplayable pitch conditions caused by freezing weather. The match was rescheduled to 2 December 1999 and relocated to Georgi Asparuhov Stadium, Sofia, Bulgaria.)
19:15

Spartak Moscow (Russia)	2–1	(England) Leeds United
Shirko 38'; Róbson 65'	Report	Kewell 14'

Georgi Asparuhov Stadium, Sofia, Bulgaria
Attendance: 5,485
Referee: Anders Frisk (Sweden)
9 December 1999
21:00

Leeds United (England)	1–0	(Russia) Spartak Moscow
Radebe 84'	Report

Elland Road, Leeds
Attendance: 39,732
Referee: Antonio López Nieto (Spain)

2–2 on aggregate; Leeds United won on away goals.

25 November 1999
17:00

Slavia Prague (Czech Republic)	4–1	(Romania) Steaua București
Dostálek 1', 47'; Horváth 35'; Došek 56'	Report	Luţu 82'

Stadion Evžena Rošického, Prague
Attendance: 4,266
Referee: Giorgos Bikas (Greece)
9 December 1999
19:00

Steaua București (Romania)	1–1	(Czech Republic) Slavia Prague
Ciocoiu 45'	Report	Dostálek 50'

Stadionul Steaua, Bucharest
Attendance: 8,300
Referee: Graziano Cesari (Italy)

Slavia Prague won 5–2 on aggregate.

23 November 1999
16:00

Udinese (Italy)	0–1	(Germany) Bayer Leverkusen
	Report	Ballack 76'

Stadio Friuli, Udine
Attendance: 10,656
Referee: Alain Hamer (Luxembourg)
9 December 1999
20:15

Bayer Leverkusen (Germany)	1–2	(Italy) Udinese
Ballack 22'	Report	Margiotta 9', 18'

BayArena, Leverkusen
Attendance: 20,500
Referee: Lucílio Batista (Portugal)

2–2 on aggregate; Udinese won on away goals.

25 November 1999
21:00

Arsenal (England)	3–0	(France) Nantes
Overmars 13' (pen.); Winterburn 81'; Bergkamp 90'	Report

Arsenal Stadium, London
Attendance: 36,618
Referee: Dani Koren (Israel)
9 December 1999
20:15

Nantes (France)	3–3	(England) Arsenal
Sibierski 12', 57'; Vahirua 77'	Report	Grimandi 25'; Henry 31'; Overmars 42'

Stade de la Beaujoire, Nantes
Attendance: 28,433
Referee: Jan Wegereef (Netherlands)

Arsenal won 6–3 on aggregate.

25 November 1999
21:00

Deportivo La Coruña (Spain)	4–2	(Greece) Panathinaikos
Olivares 7' (o.g.); Pauleta 11'; Djalminha 13'; Donato 30'	Report	Warzycha 29'; Galetto 66'

Estadio Riazor, A Coruña
Attendance: 19,094
Referee: Terje Hauge (Norway)
9 December 1999
19:30

Panathinaikos (Greece)	1–1	(Spain) Deportivo La Coruña
Asanović 78' (pen.)	Report	Makaay 90'

Olympic Stadium, Athens
Attendance: 32,399
Referee: Alain Sars (France)

Deportivo La Coruña won 5–3 on aggregate.

25 November 1999
17:00

Parma (Italy)	2–1	(Austria) Sturm Graz
Di Vaio 16'; Stanić 62'	Report	Schopp 22'

Stadio Ennio Tardini, Parma
Attendance: 6,848
Referee: Dermot Gallagher (England)
9 December 1999
18:00

Sturm Graz (Austria)	3–3 (a.e.t.)	(Italy) Parma
Reinmayr 67', 94'; Vastić 86'	Report	Stanić 5', 109'; Crespo 116'

Arnold Schwarzenegger-Stadium, Graz
Attendance: 13,433
Referee: Miroslav Radoman (FR Yugoslavia)

Parma won 5–4 on aggregate.

25 November 1999
19:45

Lyon (France)	3–0	(Germany) Werder Bremen
Anderson 13', 45'; Vairelles 77'	Report

Stade de Gerland, Lyon
Attendance: 20,899
Referee: Domenico Messina (Italy)
7 December 1999
18:00

Werder Bremen (Germany)	4–0	(France) Lyon
Bode 15'; Herzog 38' (pen.); Baumann 56'; Pizarro 77'	Report

Weserstadion, Bremen
Attendance: 9,559
Referee: Atanas Uzunov (Bulgaria)

Werder Bremen won 4–3 on aggregate.

25 November 1999
18:45

Olympiacos (Greece)	1–3	(Italy) Juventus
Giannakopoulos 15'	Report	Tudor 27'; Kovačević 67'; Inzaghi 88'

Olympic Stadium, Athens
Attendance: 32,334
Referee: Rune Pedersen (Norway)
7 December 1999
18:00

Juventus (Italy)	1–2	(Greece) Olympiacos
Kovačević 1'	Report	Đorđević 38', 82' (pen.)

Stadio La Favorita, Palermo
Attendance: 16,331
Referee: Juan Fernández Marin (Spain)

Juventus won 4–3 on aggregate.

25 November 1999
21:30

Celta Vigo (Spain)	7–0	(Portugal) Benfica
Karpin 16' (pen.), 54'; Makélélé 30'; Turdó 39', 50'; Juanfran 42'; Mostovoi 61'	Report

Balaídos, Vigo
Attendance: 30,000
Referee: Paul Durkin (England)
9 December 1999
21:30

Benfica (Portugal)	1–1	(Spain) Celta Vigo
Cáceres 79' (o.g.)	Report	McCarthy 19'

Estádio da Luz, Lisbon
Attendance: 6,000
Referee: Markus Merk (Germany)

Celta Vigo won 8–1 on aggregate.

23 November 1999
18:00

VfL Wolfsburg (Germany)	2–3	(Spain) Atlético Madrid
Juskowiak 21'; Akonnor 83' (pen.)	Report	Aguilera 6', 58'; Hasselbaink 37'

VfL-Stadium, Wolfsburg
Attendance: 10,700
Referee: Luc Huyghe (Belgium)
9 December 1999
21:45

Atlético Madrid (Spain)	2–1	(Germany) VfL Wolfsburg
Hasselbaink 4'; Correa 86'	Report	Akonnor 56' (pen.)

Vicente Calderón Stadium, Madrid
Attendance: 3,000
Referee: Leslie Irvine (Northern Ireland)

Atlético Madrid won 5–3 on aggregate.

25 November 1999
18:00

Lens (France)	1–2	(Germany) 1. FC Kaiserslautern
Schjønberg 85' (o.g.)	Report	Sikora 32' (o.g.); Wagner 38'

Stade Félix-Bollaert, Lens
Attendance: 36,243
Referee: Alfredo Trentalange (Italy)
9 December 1999
18:00

1. FC Kaiserslautern (Germany)	1–4	(France) Lens
Hristov 21'	Report	Job 20', 39'; Strasser 55' (o.g.); Nyarko 90'

Fritz-Walter-Stadion, Kaiserslautern
Attendance: 26,000
Referee: Sándor Puhl (Hungary)

Lens won 5–3 on aggregate.

== Fourth round ==
=== Seeding ===
UEFA allocated the teams into two groups, each with four seeded and four unseeded teams.

Group 1		Group 2	
Seeded	Unseeded	Seeded	Unseeded
(Italy) Parma; (Italy) Juventus; (France) Monaco; (Italy) Roma	(Spain) Mallorca; (Spain) Celta Vigo; (Germany) Werder Bremen; (England) Leeds United	(Germany) Borussia Dortmund; (Spain) Atlético Madrid; (Spain) Deportivo La Coruña; (Czech Republic) Slavia Prague	(England) Arsenal; (France) Lens; (Italy) Udinese; (Turkey) Galatasaray

=== Summary ===
Team 1	Agg.	Team 2	1st leg	2nd leg
Mallorca (Spain)	4–2	(France) Monaco	4–1	0–1
Borussia Dortmund (Germany)	0–2	(Turkey) Galatasaray	0–2	0–0
Roma (Italy)	0–1	(England) Leeds United	0–0	0–1
Slavia Prague (Czech Republic)	2–2 (a)	(Italy) Udinese	1–0	1–2
Arsenal (England)	6–3	(Spain) Deportivo La Coruña	5–1	1–2
Parma (Italy)	2–3	(Germany) Werder Bremen	1–0	1–3
Juventus (Italy)	1–4	(Spain) Celta Vigo	1–0	0–4
Atlético Madrid (Spain)	4–6	(France) Lens	2–2	2–4

=== Matches ===
2 March 2000
21:30

Mallorca (Spain)	4–1	(France) Monaco
Stanković 42', 53' (pen.), 62' (pen.); Tristán 90+2'	Report	Simone 2'

Son Moix, Palma
Attendance: 17,755
Referee: Pierluigi Collina (Italy)
9 March 2000
19:15

Monaco (France)	1–0	(Spain) Mallorca
Simone 33'	Report

Stade Louis II, Monaco
Attendance: 10,239
Referee: Graham Poll (England)

Mallorca won 4–2 on aggregate.

2 March 2000
19:30

Borussia Dortmund (Germany)	0–2	(Turkey) Galatasaray
	Report	Şükür 32'; Hagi 45'

Westfalenstadion, Dortmund
Attendance: 53,000
Referee: Vítor Melo Pereira (Portugal)
9 March 2000
18:30

Galatasaray (Turkey)	0–0	(Germany) Borussia Dortmund
	Report

Ali Sami Yen Stadium, Istanbul
Attendance: 22,000
Referee: Graziano Cesari (Italy)

Galatasaray won 2–0 on aggregate.

2 March 2000
18:00

Roma (Italy)	0–0	(England) Leeds United
	Report

Stadio Olimpico, Rome
Attendance: 37,726
Referee: Gilles Veissière (France)
9 March 2000
21:00

Leeds United (England)	1–0	(Italy) Roma
Kewell 67'	Report

Elland Road, Leeds
Attendance: 39,149
Referee: José María García-Aranda (Spain)

Leeds United won 1–0 on aggregate.

29 February 2000
16:00

Slavia Prague (Czech Republic)	1–0	(Italy) Udinese
Zanchi 79' (o.g.)	Report

Stadion Evžena Rošického, Prague
Attendance: 13,149
Referee: Karl-Erik Nilsson (Sweden)
7 March 2000
18:00

Udinese (Italy)	2–1	(Czech Republic) Slavia Prague
Fiore 23'; Sosa 52'	Report	Koller 42'

Stadio Friuli, Udine
Attendance: 19,289
Referee: Terje Hauge (Norway)

2–2 on aggregate; Slavia Prague won on away goals.

2 March 2000
21:00

Arsenal (England)	5–1	(Spain) Deportivo La Coruña
Dixon 5'; Henry 30', 67'; Kanu 78'; Bergkamp 83'	Report	Djalminha 55'

Arsenal Stadium, London
Attendance: 37,837
Referee: Atanas Uzunov (Bulgaria)
9 March 2000
21:00

Deportivo La Coruña (Spain)	2–1	(England) Arsenal
Víctor 68'; Pérez 90'	Report	Henry 63'

Estadio Riazor, A Coruña
Attendance: 17,156
Referee: Oğuz Sarvan (Turkey)

Arsenal won 6–3 on aggregate.

29 February 2000
18:00

Parma (Italy)	1–0	(Germany) Werder Bremen
Crespo 5'	Report

Stadio Ennio Tardini, Parma
Attendance: 8,938
Referee: Michel Piraux (Belgium)
9 March 2000
20:45

Werder Bremen (Germany)	3–1	(Italy) Parma
Dabrowski 30'; Bode 45'; F. Cannavaro 66' (o.g.)	Report	Stanić 32'

Weserstadion, Bremen
Attendance: 30,050
Referee: Ryszard Wójcik (Poland)

Werder Bremen won 3–2 on aggregate.

2 March 2000
20:45

Juventus (Italy)	1–0	(Spain) Celta Vigo
Kovačević 50'	Report

Stadio delle Alpi, Turin
Attendance: 9,548
Referee: Hellmut Krug (Germany)
9 March 2000
21:00

Celta Vigo (Spain)	4–0	(Italy) Juventus
Makélélé 1'; Birindelli 32' (o.g.); McCarthy 47', 69'	Report

Estadio Balaídos, Vigo
Attendance: 21,860
Referee: Hugh Dallas (Scotland)

Celta Vigo won 4–1 on aggregate.

2 March 2000
20:15

Atlético Madrid (Spain)	2–2	(France) Lens
Hasselbaink 23', 78'	Report	Dacourt 15', 77'

Vicente Calderón Stadium, Madrid
Attendance: 17,557
Referee: Kyros Vassaras (Greece)
9 March 2000
21:00

Lens (France)	4–2	(Spain) Atlético Madrid
Nouma 29', 53'; Sakho 37'; Brunel 71'	Report	Hasselbaink 45'; Kiko 65'

Stade Félix-Bollaert, Lens
Attendance: 37,229
Referee: Nikolai Levnikov (Russia)

Lens won 6–4 on aggregate.

== Quarter-finals ==
=== Summary ===
Team 1	Agg.	Team 2	1st leg	2nd leg
Leeds United (England)	4–2	(Czech Republic) Slavia Prague	3–0	1–2
Arsenal (England)	6–2	(Germany) Werder Bremen	2–0	4–2
Mallorca (Spain)	2–6	(Turkey) Galatasaray	1–4	1–2
Celta Vigo (Spain)	1–2	(France) Lens	0–0	1–2

=== Matches ===
16 March 2000
21:00

Leeds United (England)	3–0	(Czech Republic) Slavia Prague
Wilcox 39'; Kewell 54'; Bowyer 59'	Report

Elland Road, Leeds
Attendance: 39,519
Referee: Markus Merk (Germany)
23 March 2000
20:00

Slavia Prague (Czech Republic)	2–1	(England) Leeds United
Ulich 52', 79' (pen.)	Report	Kewell 47'

Stadion Evžena Rošického, Prague
Attendance: 13,460
Referee: Oğuz Sarvan (Turkey)

Leeds United won 4–2 on aggregate.

16 March 2000
21:00

Arsenal (England)	2–0	(Germany) Werder Bremen
Henry 21'; Ljungberg 77'	Report

Arsenal Stadium, London
Attendance: 38,009
Referee: Claude Colombo (France)
23 March 2000
20:30

Werder Bremen (Germany)	2–4	(England) Arsenal
Bode 41'; Bogdanović 60'	Report	Parlour 8', 25', 70'; Henry 59'

Weserstadion, Bremen
Attendance: 31,400
Referee: Kim Milton Nielsen (Denmark)

Arsenal won 6–2 on aggregate.

16 March 2000
21:30

Mallorca (Spain)	1–4	(Turkey) Galatasaray
Lauren 78'	Report	Arif 44'; Emre B. 48'; Şükür 59'; Okan 65'

Son Moix, Palma
Attendance: 16,000
Referee: Dick Jol (Netherlands)
23 March 2000
20:00

Galatasaray (Turkey)	2–1	(Spain) Mallorca
Capone 33'; Şükür 45+1'	Report	Carlitos 62'

Ali Sami Yen Stadium, Istanbul
Attendance: 11,986
Referee: Stefano Braschi (Italy)

Galatasaray won 6–2 on aggregate.

16 March 2000
21:30

Celta Vigo (Spain)	0–0	(France) Lens
	Report

Balaídos, Vigo
Attendance: 16,240
Referee: Karl-Erik Nilsson (Sweden)
23 March 2000
20:45

Lens (France)	2–1	(Spain) Celta Vigo
Ismaël 62' (pen.); Nouma 72'	Report	Revivo 56'

Stade Félix-Bollaert, Lens
Attendance: 40,224
Referee: Paul Durkin (England)

Lens won 2–1 on aggregate.

== Semi-finals ==
=== Summary ===
Team 1	Agg.	Team 2	1st leg	2nd leg
Galatasaray (Turkey)	4–2	(England) Leeds United	2–0	2–2
Arsenal (England)	3–1	(France) Lens	1–0	2–1

=== Matches ===
6 April 2000
20:30

Galatasaray (Turkey)	2–0	(England) Leeds United
Şükür 13'; Capone 44'	Report

Ali Sami Yen Stadium, Istanbul
Attendance: 17,819
Referee: Hellmut Krug (Germany)
20 April 2000
21:00

Leeds United (England)	2–2	(Turkey) Galatasaray
Bakke 16', 68'	Report	Hagi 5' (pen.); Şükür 42'

Elland Road, Leeds
Attendance: 38,306
Referee: Ľuboš Micheľ (Slovakia)

Galatasaray won 4–2 on aggregate.

6 April 2000
21:00

Arsenal (England)	1–0	(France) Lens
Bergkamp 2'	Report

Arsenal Stadium, London
Attendance: 38,102
Referee: Günter Benkö (Austria)
20 April 2000
20:45

Lens (France)	1–2	(England) Arsenal
Nouma 73'	Report	Henry 41'; Kanu 87'

Stade Félix-Bollaert, Lens
Attendance: 41,043
Referee: José María García-Aranda (Spain)

Arsenal won 3–1 on aggregate.

== Final ==
The final was played on 17 May 2000 at the Parken Stadium in Copenhagen, Denmark.

17 May 2000
20:45 UTC+2

Galatasaray (Turkey)	0–0 (a.e.t.)	(England) Arsenal
	Report
Penalties
Ergün (penalty scored); Hakan Şükür (penalty scored); Ümit Davala (penalty scored); Popescu (penalty scored)	4–1	(penalty missed) Šuker; (penalty scored) Parlour; (penalty missed) Vieira

Parken Stadium, Copenhagen
Attendance: 38,919
Referee: Antonio López Nieto (Spain)
