= 1999–2000 UEFA Cup second round =

International football competition

The second round of the 1999–2000 UEFA Cup was played from 19 October to 4 November 1999. The round included 48 winners from the first round.

== Summary ==
Team 1	Agg.	Team 2	1st leg	2nd leg
Aris (Greece)	2–4	(Spain) Celta Vigo	2–2	0–2
Udinese (Italy)	2–1	(Poland) Legia Warsaw	1–0	1–1
Deportivo La Coruña (Spain)	5–1	(France) Montpellier	3–1	2–0
Widzew Łódź (Poland)	1–3	(France) Monaco	1–1	0–2
MTK Hungária (Hungary)	2–2 (a)	(Greece) AEK Athens	2–1	0–1
Roda JC (Netherlands)	0–1	(Germany) VfL Wolfsburg	0–0	0–1
Anderlecht (Belgium)	2–4	(Italy) Bologna	2–1	0–3
PAOK (Greece)	3–3 (1–4 p)	(Portugal) Benfica	1–2	2–1 (a.e.t.)
Inter Slovnaft Bratislava (Slovakia)	0–7	(France) Nantes	0–3	0–4
Atlético Madrid (Spain)	5–1	(Poland) Amica Wronki	1–0	4–1
Parma (Italy)	4–1	(Sweden) Helsingborgs IF	1–0	3–1
GAK (Austria)	2–2 (a)	(Greece) Panathinaikos	2–1	0–1
Steaua București (Romania)	2–0	(England) West Ham United	2–0	0–0
Levski Sofia (Bulgaria)	2–4	(Italy) Juventus	1–3	1–1
Leeds United (England)	7–1	(Russia) Lokomotiv Moscow	4–1	3–0
Hapoel Haifa (Israel)	1–3	(Netherlands) Ajax	0–3	1–0
Slavia Prague (Czech Republic)	3–2	(Switzerland) Grasshopper	3–1	0–1
Zürich (Switzerland)	2–5	(England) Newcastle United	1–2	1–3
Werder Bremen (Germany)	2–2 (a)	(Norway) Viking	0–0	2–2
Teplice (Czech Republic)	1–5	(Spain) Mallorca	1–2	0–3
IFK Göteborg (Sweden)	0–3	(Italy) Roma	0–2	0–1
Lyon (France)	2–0	(Scotland) Celtic	1–0	1–0
Lens (France)	5–2	(Netherlands) Vitesse	4–1	1–1
Tottenham Hotspur (England)	1–2	(Germany) 1. FC Kaiserslautern	1–0	0–2

== Matches ==
19 October 1999
18:00

Aris (Greece)	2–2	(Spain) Celta Vigo
Paulo Andrioli 44'; Kyzeridis 68'	Report	Karpin 41', 42'

Kleanthis Vikelidis Stadium, Thessaloniki
Attendance: 14,233
Referee: Stuart Dougal (Scotland)
4 November 1999
21:30

Celta Vigo (Spain)	2–0	(Greece) Aris
Đorović 67'; Turdó 90'	Report

Balaídos, Vigo
Attendance: 12,630
Referee: Livio Bazzoli (Italy)

Celta Vigo won 4–2 on aggregate.

19 October 1999
18:00

Udinese (Italy)	1–0	(Poland) Legia Warsaw
Sosa 29'	Report

Stadio Friuli, Udine
Attendance: 13,000
Referee: Fritz Stuchlik (Austria)
4 November 1999
18:00

Legia Warsaw (Poland)	1–1	(Italy) Udinese
Czereszewski 11'	Report	Sosa 41'

Polish Army Stadium, Warsaw
Attendance: 10,200
Referee: Kenny Clark (Scotland)

Udinese won 2–1 on aggregate.

19 October 1999
18:00

Deportivo La Coruña (Spain)	3–1	(France) Montpellier
Pauleta 17'; Djalminha 51' (pen.); Makaay 53'	Report	Delaye 6'

Estadio Riazor, A Coruña
Attendance: 12,987
Referee: Kyros Vassaras (Greece)
4 November 1999
18:00

Montpellier (France)	0–2	(Spain) Deportivo La Coruña
	Report	Makaay 45'; Pauleta 82'

Stade de la Mosson, Montpellier
Attendance: 16,845
Referee: Herbert Fandel (Germany)

Deportivo La Coruña won 5–1 on aggregate.

21 October 1999
18:00

Widzew Łódź (Poland)	1–1	(France) Monaco
Wichniarek 5' (pen.)	Report	Giuly 40'

Stadion Widzewa, Łódź
Attendance: 2,915
Referee: Fiorenzo Treossi (Italy)
2 November 1999
18:00

Monaco (France)	2–0	(Poland) Widzew Łódź
Lamouchi 50'; Trezeguet 84'	Report

Stade Louis II, Monaco
Attendance: 5,130
Referee: Ivan Dobrinov (Bulgaria)

Monaco won 3–1 on aggregate.

21 October 1999
20:00

MTK Hungária (Hungary)	2–1	(Greece) AEK Athens
Egressy 20'; Erős 34'	Report	Ćirić 66'

Hidegkuti Nándor Stadium, Budapest
Attendance: 2,850
Referee: Dani Koren (Israel)
2 November 1999
17:00

AEK Athens (Greece)	1–0	(Hungary) MTK Hungária
Ćirić 75' (pen.)	Report

Nea Smyrni Stadium, Athens
Attendance: 7,288
Referee: Pascal Garibian (France)

2–2 on aggregate; AEK Athens won on away goals.

21 October 1999
20:35

Roda JC (Netherlands)	0–0	(Germany) VfL Wolfsburg
	Report

Sportpark Kaalheide, Kerkrade
Attendance: 7,700
Referee: Valentin Ivanov (Russia)
2 November 1999
18:00

VfL Wolfsburg (Germany)	1–0	(Netherlands) Roda JC
Akonnor 87'	Report

VfL-Stadium, Wolfsburg
Attendance: 7,677
Referee: Georgios Bikas (Greece)

VfL Wolfsburg won 1–0 on aggregate.

21 October 1999
20:00

Anderlecht (Belgium)	2–1	(Italy) Bologna
Koller 17', 35'	Report	Signori 90'

Constant Vanden Stock Stadium, Brussels
Attendance: 16,995
Referee: Leif Sundell (Sweden)
2 November 1999
18:00

Bologna (Italy)	3–0	(Belgium) Anderlecht
Eriberto 45'; Zé Elias 51'; Nervo 90'	Report

Stadio Renato Dall'Ara, Bologna
Attendance: 21,548
Referee: Stéphane Bré (France)

Bologna won 4–2 on aggregate.

21 October 1999
20:00

PAOK (Greece)	1–2	(Portugal) Benfica
Frantzeskos 90'	Report	Nuno Gomes 68'; Ronaldo Guiaro 90'

Toumba Stadium, Thessaloniki
Attendance: 28,008
Referee: Dieter Schoch (Switzerland)
4 November 1999
20:30

Benfica (Portugal)	1–2 (a.e.t.)	(Greece) PAOK
Kandaurov 50'	Report	Marangos 28'; Sabry 44'
Penalties
Ronaldo Guiaro (penalty scored); Maniche (penalty scored); Chano (penalty scored); Paulo Madeira (penalty scored)	4–1	(penalty missed) Frousos; (penalty missed) Machairidis; (penalty scored) Bandović

Estádio da Luz, Lisbon
Attendance: 28,000
Referee: Roelof Luinge (Netherlands)

3–3 on aggregate; Benfica won 4–1 on penalties.

21 October 1999
18:00

Inter Slovnaft Bratislava (Slovakia)	0–3	(France) Nantes
	Report	Sibierski 26' (pen.); Da Rocha 35'; Carrière 86'

Štadión Pasienky, Bratislava
Attendance: 4,486
Referee: Roy Helge Olsen (Norway)
4 November 1999
20:00

Nantes (France)	4–0	(Slovakia) Inter Slovnaft Bratislava
Sibierski 49'; Monterrubio 61'; Devineau 74'; Da Rocha 82'	Report

Stade de la Beaujoire, Nantes
Attendance: 13,700
Referee: Marcel Lica (Romania)

Nantes won 7–0 on aggregate.

21 October 1999
21:30

Atlético Madrid (Spain)	1–0	(Poland) Amica Wronki
Baraja 79'	Report

Vicente Calderón Stadium, Madrid
Attendance: 7,391
Referee: Konrad Plautz (Austria)
4 November 1999
19:55

Amica Wronki (Poland)	1–4	(Spain) Atlético Madrid
Jackiewicz 34'	Report	Hasselbaink 31'; Capdevila 45'; Baraja 52'; Correa 84'

Stadion Amica, Wronki
Attendance: 3,357
Referee: Sándor Puhl (Hungary)

Atlético Madrid won 5–1 on aggregate.

21 October 1999
21:00

Parma (Italy)	1–0	(Sweden) Helsingborgs IF
F. Cannavaro 44'	Report

Stadio Ennio Tardini, Parma
Attendance: 3,530
Referee: Costas Kapitanis (Cyprus)
4 November 1999
19:00

Helsingborgs IF (Sweden)	1–3	(Italy) Parma
Stavrum 86'	Report	Di Vaio 11', 42', 43'

Olympia, Helsingborg
Attendance: 11,973
Referee: Vasyl Melnychuk (Ukraine)

Parma won 4–1 on aggregate.

21 October 1999
20:30

GAK (Austria)	2–1	(Greece) Panathinaikos
Lipa 57'; Pamić 80'	Report	Sypniewski 64'

Arnold Schwarzenegger Stadium, Graz
Attendance: 5,214
Referee: Alan Snoddy (Northern Ireland)
4 November 1999
20:00

Panathinaikos (Greece)	1–0	(Austria) GAK
Pflipsen 90'	Report

Olympic Stadium, Athens
Attendance: 12,621
Referee: Vladimír Hriňák (Slovakia)

2–2 on aggregate; Panathinaikos won on away goals.

21 October 1999
19:45

Steaua București (Romania)	2–0	(England) West Ham United
Rosu 39'; Ilie 56'	Report

Stadionul Steaua, Bucharest
Attendance: 12,550
Referee: Claus Bo Larsen (Denmark)
4 November 1999
21:00

West Ham United (England)	0–0	(Romania) Steaua București
	Report

Boleyn Ground, London
Attendance: 24,514
Referee: Lubomír Puček (Czech Republic)

Steaua București won 2–0 on aggregate.

21 October 1999
18:00

Levski Sofia (Bulgaria)	1–3	(Italy) Juventus
Yoffou 55'	Report	Oliseh 23'; Kovačević 52', 89'

Georgi Asparuhov Stadium, Sofia
Attendance: 27,000
Referee: Jorge Monteiro Coroado (Portugal)
4 November 1999
20:45

Juventus (Italy)	1–1	(Bulgaria) Levski Sofia
Kovačević 79'	Report	Atanasov 15'

Stadio delle Alpi, Turin
Attendance: 2,681
Referee: Frank De Bleeckere (Belgium)

Juventus won 4–2 on aggregate.

21 October 1999
21:00

Leeds United (England)	4–1	(Russia) Lokomotiv Moscow
Bowyer 27', 45'; Smith 56'; Kewell 83'	Report	Loskov 80'

Elland Road, Leeds
Attendance: 37,814
Referee: Wolfgang Stark (Germany)
4 November 1999
19:00

Lokomotiv Moscow (Russia)	0–3	(England) Leeds United
	Report	Harte 15'; Bridges 28', 45'

Lokomotiv Stadium, Moscow
Attendance: 10,102
Referee: Alain Sars (France)

Leeds United won 7–1 on aggregate.

21 October 1999
20:30

Hapoel Haifa (Israel)	0–3	(Netherlands) Ajax
	Report	Machlas 3'; Knopper 12'; Laudrup 55'

Kiryat Eliezer Stadium, Haifa
Attendance: 14,000
Referee: Tomasz Mikulski (Poland)
4 November 1999
20:30

Ajax (Netherlands)	0–1	(Israel) Hapoel Haifa
	Report	Roso 60'

Amsterdam Arena, Amsterdam
Attendance: 37,400
Referee: Knud Erik Fisker (Denmark)

Ajax won 3–1 on aggregate.

21 October 1999
17:00

Slavia Prague (Czech Republic)	3–1	(Switzerland) Grasshopper
Ulich 19', 50'; Kuchař 40'	Report	Yakin 23'

Stadion Evžena Rošického, Prague
Attendance: 4,555
Referee: Éric Poulat (France)
4 November 1999
19:00

Grasshopper (Switzerland)	1–0	(Czech Republic) Slavia Prague
Yakin 76'	Report

Hardturm, Zürich
Attendance: 3,300
Referee: Luc Huyghe (Belgium)

Slavia Prague won 3–2 on aggregate.

21 October 1999
20:15

Zürich (Switzerland)	1–2	(England) Newcastle United
Castillo 68'	Report	Marić 51'; Shearer 60'

Letzigrund, Zürich
Attendance: 9,600
Referee: Jacek Granat (Poland)
4 November 1999
21:00

Newcastle United (England)	3–1	(Switzerland) Zürich
Marić 33'; Ferguson 58'; Speed 61'	Report	Jamarauli 17'

St James' Park, Newcastle
Attendance: 34,502
Referee: Domenico Messina (Italy)

Newcastle United won 5–2 on aggregate.

21 October 1999
18:15

Werder Bremen (Germany)	0–0	(Norway) Viking
	Report

Weserstadion, Bremen
Attendance: 5,984
Referee: Eric Romain (Belgium)
4 November 1999
18:00

Viking (Norway)	2–2	(Germany) Werder Bremen
Berland 3'; Daðason 77'	Report	Wiedener 43'; Herzog 62'

Stavanger Stadion, Stavanger
Attendance: 6,120
Referee: Arturo Daudén Ibáñez (Spain)

2–2 on aggregate; Werder Bremen won on away goals.

21 October 1999
19:30

Teplice (Czech Republic)	1–2	(Spain) Mallorca
Verbíř 67'	Report	Tristán 26', 31'

Na Stínadlech, Teplice
Attendance: 5,850
Referee: Mikko Vuorela (Finland)
4 November 1999
21:30

Mallorca (Spain)	3–0	(Czech Republic) Teplice
Nadal 31'; Stanković 58'; Niño 68'	Report

San Moix, Palma de Mallorca
Attendance: 12,372
Referee: Edgar Steinborn (Germany)

Mallorca won 5–1 on aggregate.

21 October 1999
19:00

IFK Göteborg (Sweden)	0–2	(Italy) Roma
	Report	Montella 37', 52'

Ullevi, Gothenburg
Attendance: 18,319
Referee: Dermot Gallagher (England)
4 November 1999
18:00

Roma (Italy)	1–0	(Sweden) IFK Göteborg
Fábio Júnior 88'	Report

Stadio Olimpico, Rome
Attendance: 9,767
Referee: Victor Esquinas Torres (Spain)

Roma won 3–0 on aggregate.

21 October 1999
20:45

Lyon (France)	1–0	(Scotland) Celtic
Blanc 63'	Report

Stade de Gerland, Lyon
Attendance: 28,539
Referee: René Temmink (Netherlands)
4 November 1999
20:45

Celtic (Scotland)	0–1	(France) Lyon
	Report	Vairelles 17'

Celtic Park, Glasgow
Attendance: 54,291
Referee: Georg Dardenne (Germany)

Lyon won 2–0 on aggregate.

28 October 1999
20:45

Lens (France)	4–1	(Netherlands) Vitesse
Brunel 3'; Nouma 17'; Nyarko 76'; Blanchard 87'	Report	van Hooijdonk 73'

Stade Félix-Bollaert, Lens
Attendance: 36,326
Referee: Siarhei Shmolik (Belarus)
4 November 1999
20:00

Vitesse (Netherlands)	1–1	(France) Lens
Kreek 64'	Report	Blanchard 90'

GelreDome, Arnhem
Attendance: 13,000
Referee: Bernhard Brugger (Austria)

Lens won 5–2 on aggregate.

28 October 1999
21:00

Tottenham Hotspur (England)	1–0	(Germany) 1. FC Kaiserslautern
Iversen 33'	Report

White Hart Lane, London
Attendance: 35,177
Referee: Orhan Erdemir (Turkey)
4 November 1999
20:30

1. FC Kaiserslautern (Germany)	2–0	(England) Tottenham Hotspur
Buck 89'; Carr 90' (o.g.)	Report

Fritz-Walter-Stadion, Kaiserslautern
Attendance: 29,044
Referee: Juan Ansuátegui Roca (Spain)

1. FC Kaiserslautern won 2–1 on aggregate.
