= Liron Basis =

Israeli footballer

Liron Basis לירון בסיס
Personal information
- Full name: Liron Basis
- Date of birth: March 26, 1974 (age 52)
- Place of birth: Haifa, Israel
- Position: Midfielder

Youth career
- Maccabi Haifa

Senior career*
| Years | Team | Apps | (Gls) |
| 1992–1993 | Maccabi Haifa | 3 | (0) |
| 1993–1997 | Hapoel Be'er Sheva | | |
| 1997–1999 | Hapoel Haifa | | |
| 1999–2001 | Maccabi Tel Aviv | 31 | (5) |
| 2001 | Beitar Jerusalem | 3 | (0) |
| 2001–2003 | Maccabi Petah Tikva | 26 | (1) |
| 2004–2005 | Maccabi Netanya | 24 | (3) |
| 2005–2008 | Maccabi Amishav Petah Tikva | 31 | (10) |

International career
| 1994–1995 | Israel U21 | 6 | (2) |
- * Club domestic league appearances and goals

Liron Basis (Hebrew: לירון בסיס) is a former Israeli footballer.

== Personal life ==
In May 2024, Basis was arrested in Moscow. He had been on the international wanted list by UK's Interpol on suspicion of fraud.

== Honours ==
- Israel State Cup:
  - 1996–97
- Israeli Premier League:
  - 1998–99
- Toto Cup (Leumit):
  - 2004–05
