= 1999–2000 UEFA Cup =

29th season of Europe's secondary club football tournament organised by UEFA

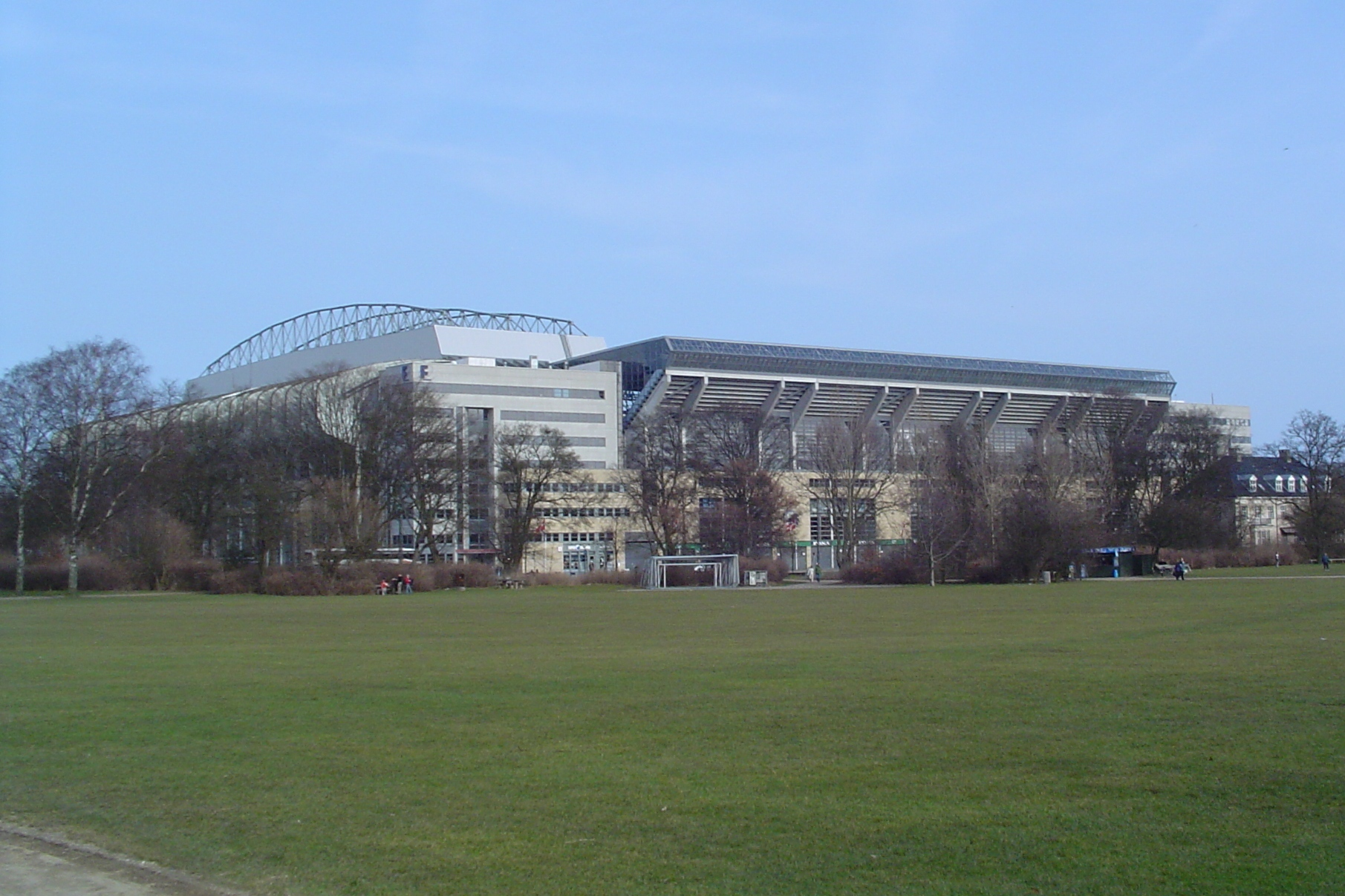
- Parken Stadium, in Østerbro, hosted the final.
- Dates: 10 August 1999 – 17 May 2000

Final positions
- Champions: (Turkey) Galatasaray (1st title)
- Runners-up: (England) Arsenal

Tournament statistics
- Matches played: 205
- Goals scored: 565 (2.76 per match)
- Attendance: 3,235,368 (15,782 per match)
- Top scorer(s): Darko Kovačević (Juventus); 10 goals

The 1999–2000 UEFA Cup season was the 29th edition of the UEFA Cup competition. The final took place at Parken Stadium in Copenhagen and was won by Galatasaray, who defeated Arsenal in the final. The game was scoreless through the first ninety minutes and stayed that way through thirty minutes of extra time. The match went on to penalty kicks in which Gheorghe Popescu scored the winning goal to win the cup. Galatasaray won the cup without losing a single game. The competition was marred by violence involving Turkish and English hooligans in the semi-finals and the final, in particular the fatal stabbings of Leeds United fans Kevin Speight and Christopher Loftus by Galatasaray fans in Istanbul.

Parma were the defending champions, but were eliminated by Werder Bremen in the fourth round. They entered in the first round due to elimination in the third qualifying round of the UEFA Champions League.

It was the first season of the new format UEFA Cup; it had absorbed the now defunct Cup Winners' Cup to include domestic cup winners, and now featured an additional knockout round. This was the first year when the UEFA Cup winners qualified for the UEFA Super Cup. This season's champions also qualified for the 2001 FIFA Club World Championship, which was never held. So far, Galatasaray are the only UEFA Cup winners to qualify for a Club World Cup.

== Association team allocation ==
A total of 142 teams from 49 UEFA associations participated in the 1999–2000 UEFA Cup. Associations are allocated places according to their 1999–2000 UEFA league coefficient.

Below is the qualification scheme for the 1999–00 UEFA Cup:

- Associations 1–6 each enter three teams
- Associations 7–8 each enter four teams
- Associations 9–15 each enter two teams
- Associations 16–21 each enter three teams
- Associations 22–50 each enter two teams, with the exception of Bosnia who didn't have a domestic league winner, as well as Liechtenstein and Andorra who enter with only one team each
- 3 winners of the Intertoto Cup
- 16 teams eliminated from the 1999–2000 UEFA Champions League third qualifying round are transferred to the UEFA Cup
- 8 teams eliminated from the 1999–2000 UEFA Champions League first group stage are transferred to the UEFA Cup

=== Association ranking ===
Rank	Association	Coeff.	Teams	Notes
1	Italy	59.640	3	+1 (UCL) +1 (IT)
2	Germany	49.932	3	+2 (UCL)
3	Spain	48.580	3	+1 (UCL)
4	France	41.433	3	+1 (UCL) +1 (IT)
5	Netherlands	35.916	3	
6	England	35.566	3	+1 (UCL) +1 (IT)
7	Portugal	31.266	4	
8	Greece	28.750	4	+2 (UCL)
9	Czech Republic	28.166	2	+1 (UCL)
10	Norway	27.449	2	+1 (FP)
11	Austria	27.250	2	+2 (UCL)
12	Russia	26.866	2	+1 (UCL)
13	Croatia	26.166	2	
14	Turkey	25.650	2	+1 (UCL)
15	Denmark	24.200	2	+2 (UCL)
16	Switzerland	22.250	3	+1 (UCL)
17	Ukraine	22.082	3	
18	Poland	22.000	3	+1 (UCL)

Rank	Association	Coeff.	Teams	Notes
19	Hungary	21.083	3	+1 (UCL)
20	Belgium	21.000	3	
21	Slovakia	20.999	3	
22	Romania	20.750	2	
23	Sweden	20.600	2	
24	Georgia	20.333	2	
25	Cyprus	20.332	2	+1 (UCL)
26	Scotland	19.500	2	+1 (UCL) +1 (FP)
27	Israel	16.749	2	+1 (UCL)
28	Slovenia	15.998	2	
29	Belarus	14.833	2	
30	Iceland	13.666	2	
31	Finland	13.415	2	
32	Latvia	11.498	2	+1 (UCL)
33	Bulgaria	10.499	2	
34	Macedonia	8.666	2	
35	Lithuania	7.333	2	
36	FR Yugoslavia	7.083	2	+1 (UCL)
37	Moldova	6.333	2	+1 (UCL)

Rank	Association	Coeff.	Teams	Notes
38	Liechtenstein	5.000	1	
39	Estonia	4.999	2	+1 (FP)
40	Armenia	4.832	2	
41	Northern Ireland	4.665	2	
42	Malta	4.664	2	
43	Wales	3.999	2	
44	Republic of Ireland	3.998	2	
45	Faroe Islands	2.833	2	
46	Albania	2.666	2	
47	Luxembourg	2.333	2	
48	Azerbaijan	1.833	2	
49	Bosnia and Herzegovina	0.000	0	
50	Andorra	0.000	1	
51	San Marino	0.000	0	

Notes

- (UCL): Additional teams transferred from the UEFA Champions League
- (IT): Additional teams from Intertoto Cup

=== Distribution ===
	Teams entering in this round	Teams advancing from previous round	Teams transferred from Champions League
Qualifying round (76 teams)	76 teams from associations 9–50		
First round (96 teams)	39 teams from associations 1–21; 3 teams from the Intertoto Cup	38 winners from the qualifying round	16 losing teams from Champions League qualifying
Second round (48 teams)		48 winners from the first round	
Third round (32 teams)		24 winners from the second round	8 third placed teams from the Champions League first group stage
Fourth round (16 teams)		16 winners from the third round	
Play-offs (8 teams)		8 winners from the fourth round play the quarter-finals, semi-finals and final	

=== Redistribution rules ===
A UEFA Cup place is vacated when a team qualify for both the Champions League and the UEFA Cup, or qualify for the UEFA Cup by more than one method. When a place is vacated, it is redistributed within the national association by the following rules:

- When the domestic cup winners (considered as the "highest-placed" qualifier within the national association) also qualify for the Champions League, their UEFA Cup place is vacated, and the remaining UEFA Cup qualifiers are moved up one place, with the final place (with the earliest starting round) taken by the domestic cup runners-up, provided they do not already qualify for the Champions League or the UEFA Cup. Otherwise, UEFA forgot to establish a rule, so each association decided how to assign this place.
- When the domestic cup winners also qualify for the UEFA Cup through league position, their place through the league position is vacated, and the UEFA Cup qualifiers which finish lower in the league are moved up one place, with the final place taken by the highest-placed league finisher which do not qualify for the UEFA Cup yet.
- A place vacated by the League Cup winners is taken by the highest-placed league finisher which do not qualify for the UEFA Cup yet.
- A Fair Play place is taken by the highest-ranked team in the domestic Fair Play table which do not qualify for the Champions League or UEFA Cup yet.

=== Teams ===
The labels in the parentheses show how each team qualified for the place of its starting round:

- TH: Title holders
- CW: Cup winners
- CR: Cup runners-up
- LC: League Cup winners
- Nth: League position
- PO: End-of-season European competition play-off winners
- FP: Fair play
- IT: Intertoto Cup winners
- CL: Relegated from the Champions League
  - GS: Third-placed teams from the group stage
  - Q3: Losers from the third qualifying round

Third round
(Germany) Bayer Leverkusen (CL GS)	(England) Arsenal (CL GS)	(Austria) Sturm Graz (CL GS)	(Turkey) Galatasaray (CL GS)
(Germany) Borussia Dortmund (CL GS)	(Greece) Olympiacos (CL GS)	(Russia) Spartak Moscow (CL GS)	(Scotland) Rangers (CL GS)
First round
(Italy) Roma (5th)	(England) Leeds United (4th)	(Croatia) Osijek (CW)	(Austria) Rapid Wien (CL Q3)
(Italy) Udinese (6th)	(England) Tottenham Hotspur (LC)	(Turkey) Fenerbahçe (3rd)	(Denmark) AaB (CL Q3)
(Italy) Bologna (PO)	(England) Newcastle United (CR)	(Denmark) AB (CW)	(Denmark) Brøndby (CL Q3)
(Germany) Werder Bremen (CW)	(Portugal) Beira-Mar (CW)	(Switzerland) Lausanne-Sports (CW)	(Switzerland) Servette (CL Q3)
(Germany) 1. FC Kaiserslautern (5th)	(Portugal) Benfica (3rd)	(Ukraine) Karpaty Lviv (CR)	(Poland) Widzew Łódź (CL Q3)
(Germany) VfL Wolfsburg (6th)	(Portugal) Sporting CP (4th)	(Poland) Amica Wronki (CW)	(Hungary) MTK Hungária (CL Q3)
(Spain) Celta Vigo (5th)	(Portugal) Vitória de Setúbal (5th)	(Hungary) Debrecen (CW)	(Cyprus) Anorthosis Famagusta (CL Q3)
(Spain) Deportivo La Coruña (6th)	(Greece) Panathinaikos (3rd)	(Belgium) Lierse (CW)	(Israel) Hapoel Haifa (CL Q3)
(Spain) Atlético Madrid (CR)	(Greece) PAOK (4th)	(Slovakia) Dukla Banská Bystrica (CR)	(Latvia) Skonto (CL Q3)
(France) Nantes (CW)	(Greece) Ionikos (5th)	(Italy) Parma^{TH} (CL Q3)	(Federal Republic of Yugoslavia) Partizan (CL Q3)
(France) Monaco (4th)	(Greece) Aris (6th)	(Spain) Mallorca (CL Q3)	(Moldova) Zimbru Chișinău (CL Q3)
(France) Lens (LC)	(Czech Republic) Slavia Prague (CW)	(France) Lyon (CL Q3)	(Italy) Juventus (IC)
(Netherlands) Ajax (CW)	(Norway) Stabæk (CW)	(Greece) AEK Athens (CL Q3)	(France) Montpellier (IC)
(Netherlands) Vitesse (4th)	(Austria) LASK (CR)	(Czech Republic) Teplice (CL Q3)	(England) West Ham United (IC)
(Netherlands) Roda JC (5th)	(Russia) Zenit Saint Petersburg (CW)		
Qualifying round
(Czech Republic) Sigma Olomouc (4th)	(Romania) Steaua București (CW)	(Finland) VPS (2nd)	(Northern Ireland) Linfield (2nd)
(Norway) Viking (4th)	(Romania) Dinamo București (2nd)	(Latvia) Rīga (CW)	(Malta) Birkirkara (2nd)
(Austria) GAK (3rd)	(Sweden) Helsingborgs IF (2nd)	(Latvia) Liepājas Metalurgs (2nd)	(Malta) Sliema Wanderers (3rd)
(Russia) Lokomotiv Moscow (3rd)	(Sweden) IFK Göteborg (CR)	(Bulgaria) CSKA Sofia (CW)	(Wales) Inter Cardiff (CW)
(Croatia) Hajduk Split (3rd)	(Georgia (country)) Torpedo Kutaisi (CW)	(Bulgaria) Levski Sofia (2nd)	(Wales) Cwmbrân Town (2nd)
(Turkey) Ankaragücü (PO)	(Georgia (country)) Locomotive Tbilisi (3rd)	(North Macedonia) Vardar (CW)	(Republic of Ireland) Bray Wanderers (CW)
(Denmark) Lyngby (4th)	(Cyprus) APOEL (CW)	(North Macedonia) Sileks (2nd)	(Republic of Ireland) Cork City (2nd)
(Switzerland) Grasshopper (2nd)	(Cyprus) Omonia (2nd)	(Lithuania) Kareda (2nd)	(Faroe Islands) KÍ (CW)
(Switzerland) Zürich (4th)	(Scotland) Celtic (2nd)	(Lithuania) Kaunas (CR)	(Faroe Islands) B36 (3rd)
(Ukraine) Shakhtar Donetsk (2nd)	(Scotland) St Johnstone (3rd)	(Federal Republic of Yugoslavia) Red Star Belgrade (CW)	(Albania) Vllaznia (2nd)
(Ukraine) Kryvbas Kryvyi Rih (3rd)	(Israel) Hapoel Tel Aviv (CW)	(Federal Republic of Yugoslavia) Vojvodina (4th)	(Albania) Bylis (3rd)
(Poland) Legia Warsaw (3rd)	(Israel) Maccabi Tel Aviv (2nd)	(Moldova) Sheriff Tiraspol (CW)	(Luxembourg) F91 Dudelange (2nd)
(Poland) Lech Poznań (4th)	(Slovenia) HIT Gorica (2nd)	(Moldova) Constructorul Chișinău (2nd)	(Luxembourg) Mondercange (CR)
(Hungary) Ferencváros (2nd)	(Slovenia) Olimpija Ljubljana (CR)	(Liechtenstein) Vaduz (CW)	(Azerbaijan) Neftçi (CW)
(Hungary) Újpest (3rd)	(Belarus) Belshina Bobruisk (CW)	(Estonia) Levadia Maardu (CW)	(Azerbaijan) Shamkir (2nd)
(Belgium) Club Brugge (2nd)	(Belarus) BATE Borisov (2nd)	(Estonia) Lantana (3rd)	(Andorra) Principat (1st)
(Belgium) Anderlecht (3rd)	(Iceland) KR (2nd)	(Armenia) Shirak (2nd)	(Norway) Bodø/Glimt (FP)
(Slovakia) Inter Slovnaft Bratislava (2nd)	(Iceland) Leiftur (CR)	(Armenia) Yerevan (3rd)	(Scotland) Kilmarnock (FP)
(Slovakia) Spartak Trnava (3rd)	(Finland) HJK (CW)	(Northern Ireland) Portadown (CW)	(Estonia) Viljandi Tulevik (FP)

Notes

1. Poland (POL): Polish club Wisła Kraków was banned from European competitions by UEFA. As a result, league runners-up Widzew Łódź were promoted to Champions League, while fourth-placed Lech Poznań were awarded UEFA Cup spot.
2. FR Yugoslavia (YUG): League runners-up Obilić were excluded from the UEFA competitions because the club owner Arkan was charged with war crimes. Their place was given to fourth-placed Vojvodina.
3. Estonia (EST): 1998 Meistriliiga runners-up Tallinna Sadam merged into Levadia Maardu (who also won the Cup) after the season. Sadam's UEFA Cup spot was given to third-placed Lantana.

== Round and draw dates ==
The schedule of the competition was as follows. Matches were scheduled for Thursdays apart from the final, which took place on a Wednesday, though exceptionally could take place on Tuesdays or Wednesdays due to scheduling conflicts.

Schedule for 1999–2000 UEFA Cup
Round	Draw date	First leg	Second leg
Qualifying round	30 June 1999	12 August 1999	26 August 1999
First round	27 August 1999	16 September 1999	30 September 1999
Second round	1 October 1999	21 October 1999	4 November 1999
Third round	5 November 1999	25 November 1999	9 December 1999
Fourth round	15 December 1999	2 March 2000	9 March 2000
Quarter-finals	15 December 1999	16 March 2000	23 March 2000
Semi-finals	24 March 2000	6 April 2000	20 April 2000
Final	24 March 2000	17 May 2000 at Parken Stadium, Copenhagen	

== Qualifying round ==
Team 1	Agg.	Team 2	1st leg	2nd leg
Shakhtar Donetsk (Ukraine)	4–3	(North Macedonia) Sileks	3–1	1–2
HJK (Finland)	2–1 (Note: Order of legs reversed)	(Armenia) Shirak	2–0	0–1
Locomotive Tbilisi (Georgia (country))	2–1	(Northern Ireland) Linfield	1–0	1–1
Sheriff Tiraspol (Moldova)	1–1 (a)	(Czech Republic) Sigma Olomouc	1–1	0–0
Yerevan (Armenia)	1–4	(Israel) Hapoel Tel Aviv	0–2	1–2
Neftçi (Azerbaijan)	2–4	(Federal Republic of Yugoslavia) Red Star Belgrade	2–3	0–1
Vllaznia (Albania)	1–3	(Slovakia) Spartak Trnava	1–1	0–2
BATE Borisov (Belarus)	1–12	(Russia) Lokomotiv Moscow	1–7	0–5
Lantana (Estonia)	2–9	(Georgia (country)) Torpedo Kutaisi	0–5	2–4
Liepājas Metalurgs (Latvia)	4–5	(Poland) Lech Poznań	3–2	1–3
HIT Gorica (Slovenia)	2–1	(Wales) Inter Cardiff	2–0	0–1
Vojvodina (Federal Republic of Yugoslavia)	5–1	(Hungary) Újpest	4–0	1–1
Viljandi Tulevik (Estonia)	0–5	(Belgium) Club Brugge	0–3	0–2
Belshina Bobruisk (Belarus)	1–8	(Cyprus) Omonia	1–5	0–3
Kryvbas Kryvyi Rih (Ukraine)	5–0	(Azerbaijan) Shamkir	3–0	2–0
KÍ (Faroe Islands)	0–9	(Austria) GAK	0–5	0–4
Rīga (Latvia)	0–5	(Sweden) Helsingborgs IF	0–0	0–5
VPS (Finland)	1–3	(Scotland) St Johnstone	1–1	0–2
Inter Slovnaft Bratislava (Slovakia)	5–1	(Albania) Bylis	3–1	2–0
Bodø/Glimt (Norway)	3–1	(Liechtenstein) Vaduz	1–0	2–1
Viking (Norway)	18–0	(Andorra) Principat	7–0	11–0
Maccabi Tel Aviv (Israel)	4–3	(Lithuania) Kaunas	3–1	1–2
Steaua București (Romania)	7–1	(Estonia) Levadia Maardu	3–0	4–1
Lyngby (Denmark)	7–0	(Malta) Birkirkara	7–0	0–0
Ankaragücü (Turkey)	2–0	(Faroe Islands) B36	1–0	1–0
Sliema Wanderers (Malta)	0–4	(Switzerland) Zürich	0–3	0–1
Grasshopper (Switzerland)	8–0	(Republic of Ireland) Bray Wanderers	4–0	4–0
IFK Göteborg (Sweden)	3–1	(Republic of Ireland) Cork City	3–0	0–1
Mondercange (Luxembourg)	2–13	(Romania) Dinamo București	2–6	0–7
Vardar (North Macedonia)	0–9	(Poland) Legia Warsaw	0–5	0–4
APOEL (Cyprus)	0–2	(Bulgaria) Levski Sofia	0–0	0–2
Anderlecht (Belgium)	9–1	(Iceland) Leiftur	6–1	3–0
Olimpija Ljubljana (Slovenia)	3–3 (a)	(Lithuania) Kareda	1–1	2–2
Hajduk Split (Croatia)	6–1	(Luxembourg) F91 Dudelange	5–0	1–1
Cwmbrân Town (Wales)	0–10	(Scotland) Celtic	0–6	0–4
Portadown (Northern Ireland)	0–8	(Bulgaria) CSKA Sofia	0–3	0–5
Ferencváros (Hungary)	4–2	(Moldova) Constructorul Chișinău	3–1	1–1
KR (Iceland)	1–2	(Scotland) Kilmarnock	1–0	0–2 (a.e.t.)

== First round ==
Team 1	Agg.	Team 2	1st leg	2nd leg
Steaua București (Romania)	5–2	(Austria) LASK	2–0	3–2
VfL Wolfsburg (Germany)	3–2	(Hungary) Debrecen	2–0	1–2
Red Star Belgrade (Federal Republic of Yugoslavia)	2–3	(France) Montpellier	0–1	2–2
Udinese (Italy)	3–1	(Denmark) AaB	1–0	2–1
Stabæk (Norway)	1–2	(Spain) Deportivo La Coruña	1–0	0–2
Partizan (Federal Republic of Yugoslavia)	1–4	(England) Leeds United	1–3	0–1
HJK (Finland)	1–6	(France) Lyon	0–1	1–5
Atlético Madrid (Spain)	3–1	(Turkey) Ankaragücü	3–0	0–1
MTK Hungária (Hungary)	2–0	(Turkey) Fenerbahçe	0–0	2–0
Anderlecht (Belgium)	6–1	(Slovenia) Olimpija Ljubljana	3–1	3–0
Roda JC (Netherlands)	5–1	(Ukraine) Shakhtar Donetsk	2–0	3–1
Bodø/Glimt (Norway)	1–6	(Germany) Werder Bremen	0–5	1–1
Viking (Norway)	3–1	(Portugal) Sporting CP	3–0	0–1
Maccabi Tel Aviv (Israel)	3–4	(France) Lens	2–2	1–2
1. FC Kaiserslautern (Germany)	5–0	(Scotland) Kilmarnock	3–0	2–0
Helsingborgs IF (Sweden)	2–2 (4–2 p)	(Ukraine) Karpaty Lviv	1–1	1–1 (a.e.t.)
Lech Poznań (Poland)	1–2	(Sweden) IFK Göteborg	1–2	0–0
Teplice (Czech Republic)	4–2	(Hungary) Ferencváros	3–1	1–1
CSKA Sofia (Bulgaria)	2–4	(England) Newcastle United	0–2	2–2
HIT Gorica (Slovenia)	0–3	(Greece) Panathinaikos	0–1	0–2
Amica Wronki (Poland)	5–4	(Denmark) Brøndby	2–0	3–4
Beira-Mar (Portugal)	1–2	(Netherlands) Vitesse	1–2	0–0
GAK (Austria)	4–2	(Slovakia) Spartak Trnava	3–0	1–2
Hajduk Split (Croatia)	0–3	(Bulgaria) Levski Sofia	0–0	0–3
Celtic (Scotland)	3–0	(Israel) Hapoel Tel Aviv	2–0	1–0
Lausanne-Sports (Switzerland)	3–6	(Spain) Celta Vigo	3–2	0–4
Ionikos (Greece)	1–4	(France) Nantes	1–3	0–1
Aris (Greece)	3–2	(Switzerland) Servette	1–1	2–1 (a.e.t.)
Monaco (France)	6–3	(Scotland) St Johnstone	3–0	3–3
Inter Slovnaft Bratislava (Slovakia)	3–1	(Austria) Rapid Wien	1–0	2–1
Lyngby (Denmark)	1–5	(Russia) Lokomotiv Moscow	1–2	0–3
Skonto (Latvia)	1–2	(Poland) Widzew Łódź	1–0	0–2
Roma (Italy)	7–1	(Portugal) Vitória de Setúbal	7–0	0–1
Parma (Italy)	6–2	(Ukraine) Kryvbas Kryvyi Rih	3–2	3–0
Hapoel Haifa (Israel)	5–5 (a)	(Belgium) Club Brugge	3–1	2–4
Torpedo Kutaisi (Georgia (country))	1–7	(Greece) AEK Athens	0–1	1–6
Omonia (Cyprus)	2–10	(Italy) Juventus	2–5	0–5
West Ham United (England)	6–1	(Croatia) Osijek	3–0	3–1
Vojvodina (Federal Republic of Yugoslavia)	2–3	(Czech Republic) Slavia Prague	0–0	2–3
Sigma Olomouc (Czech Republic)	1–3	(Spain) Mallorca	1–3	0–0
Benfica (Portugal)	2–1	(Romania) Dinamo București	0–1	2–0
Ajax (Netherlands)	9–2	(Slovakia) Dukla Banská Bystrica	6–1	3–1
Tottenham Hotspur (England)	3–0	(Moldova) Zimbru Chișinău	3–0	0–0
Zenit Saint Petersburg (Russia)	2–5	(Italy) Bologna	0–3	2–2
Anorthosis Famagusta (Cyprus)	1–2	(Poland) Legia Warsaw	1–0	0–2
Locomotive Tbilisi (Georgia (country))	0–9	(Greece) PAOK	0–7	0–2
AB (Denmark)	1–3	(Switzerland) Grasshopper	0–2	1–1
Zürich (Switzerland)	5–3	(Belgium) Lierse	1–0	4–3

== Second round ==
Team 1	Agg.	Team 2	1st leg	2nd leg
Aris (Greece)	2–4	(Spain) Celta Vigo	2–2	0–2
Udinese (Italy)	2–1	(Poland) Legia Warsaw	1–0	1–1
Deportivo La Coruña (Spain)	5–1	(France) Montpellier	3–1	2–0
Widzew Łódź (Poland)	1–3	(France) Monaco	1–1	0–2
MTK Hungária (Hungary)	2–2 (a)	(Greece) AEK Athens	2–1	0–1
Roda JC (Netherlands)	0–1	(Germany) VfL Wolfsburg	0–0	0–1
Anderlecht (Belgium)	2–4	(Italy) Bologna	2–1	0–3
PAOK (Greece)	3–3 (1–4 p)	(Portugal) Benfica	1–2	2–1 (a.e.t.)
Inter Slovnaft Bratislava (Slovakia)	0–7	(France) Nantes	0–3	0–4
Atlético Madrid (Spain)	5–1	(Poland) Amica Wronki	1–0	4–1
Parma (Italy)	4–1	(Sweden) Helsingborgs IF	1–0	3–1
GAK (Austria)	2–2 (a)	(Greece) Panathinaikos	2–1	0–1
Steaua București (Romania)	2–0	(England) West Ham United	2–0	0–0
Levski Sofia (Bulgaria)	2–4	(Italy) Juventus	1–3	1–1
Leeds United (England)	7–1	(Russia) Lokomotiv Moscow	4–1	3–0
Hapoel Haifa (Israel)	1–3	(Netherlands) Ajax	0–3	1–0
Slavia Prague (Czech Republic)	3–2	(Switzerland) Grasshopper	3–1	0–1
Zürich (Switzerland)	2–5	(England) Newcastle United	1–2	1–3
Werder Bremen (Germany)	2–2 (a)	(Norway) Viking	0–0	2–2
Teplice (Czech Republic)	1–5	(Spain) Mallorca	1–2	0–3
IFK Göteborg (Sweden)	0–3	(Italy) Roma	0–2	0–1
Lyon (France)	2–0	(Scotland) Celtic	1–0	1–0
Lens (France)	5–2	(Netherlands) Vitesse	4–1	1–1
Tottenham Hotspur (England)	1–2	(Germany) 1. FC Kaiserslautern	1–0	0–2

== Final phase ==
In the final phase, teams played against each other over two legs on a home-and-away basis, except for the one-match final. The mechanism of the draws for each round was as follows:

- In the draws for the third and fourth rounds, teams were seeded and divided into groups containing an equal number of seeded and unseeded teams. In each group, the seeded teams were drawn against the unseeded teams, with the first team drawn hosting the first leg. Teams from the same association could not be drawn against each other.
- In the draws for the quarter-finals onwards, there were no seedings and teams from the same association could be drawn against each other.

=== Bracket ===
Third round
(Netherlands) Ajax	0	0	0
(Spain) Mallorca	1	2	3
(Greece) AEK Athens	2	0	2
(France) Monaco	2	1	3
(Scotland) Rangers	2	0	2 (1)
(Germany) Borussia Dortmund (p)	0	2	2 (3)
(Italy) Bologna	1	1	2
(Turkey) Galatasaray	1	2	3
(Italy) Roma	1	0	1
(England) Newcastle United	0	0	0
(Russia) Spartak Moscow	2	0	2
(England) Leeds United (a)	1	1	2
(Czech Republic) Slavia Prague	4	1	5
(Romania) Steaua București	1	1	2
(Italy) Udinese (a)	0	2	2
(Germany) Bayer Leverkusen	1	1	2
(England) Arsenal	3	3	6
(France) Nantes	0	3	3
(Spain) Deportivo La Coruña	4	1	5
(Greece) Panathinaikos	2	1	3
(Italy) Parma (a.e.t.)	2	3	5
(Austria) Sturm Graz	1	3	4
(France) Lyon	3	0	3
(Germany) Werder Bremen	0	4	4
(Greece) Olympiacos	1	2	3
(Italy) Juventus	3	1	4
(Spain) Celta Vigo	7	1	8
(Portugal) Benfica	0	1	1
(Germany) VfL Wolfsburg	2	1	3
(Spain) Atlético Madrid	3	2	5
(France) Lens	1	4	5
(Germany) 1. FC Kaiserslautern	2	1	3

Fourth round
(Spain) Mallorca	4	0	4
(France) Monaco	1	1	2
(Germany) Borussia Dortmund	0	0	0
(Turkey) Galatasaray	2	0	2
(Italy) Roma	0	0	0
(England) Leeds United	0	1	1
(Czech Republic) Slavia Prague (a)	1	1	2
(Italy) Udinese	0	2	2
(England) Arsenal	5	1	6
(Spain) Deportivo La Coruña	1	2	3
(Italy) Parma	1	1	2
(Germany) Werder Bremen	0	3	3
(Italy) Juventus	1	0	1
(Spain) Celta Vigo	0	4	4
(Spain) Atlético Madrid	2	2	4
(France) Lens	2	4	6

Quarter-finals
(Spain) Mallorca	1	1	2
(Turkey) Galatasaray	4	2	6
(England) Leeds United	3	1	4
(Czech Republic) Slavia Prague	0	2	2
(England) Arsenal	2	4	6
(Germany) Werder Bremen	0	2	2
(Spain) Celta Vigo	0	1	1
(France) Lens	0	2	2

Semi-finals
(Turkey) Galatasaray	2	2	4
(England) Leeds United	0	2	2
(England) Arsenal	1	2	3
(France) Lens	0	1	1

Final
17 May – Copenhagen
(Turkey) Galatasaray (p)	0 (4)
(England) Arsenal	0 (1)

=== Third round ===
Team 1	Agg.	Team 2	1st leg	2nd leg
Ajax (Netherlands)	0–3	(Spain) Mallorca	0–1	0–2
AEK Athens (Greece)	2–3	(France) Monaco	2–2	0–1
Rangers (Scotland)	2–2 (1–3 p)	(Germany) Borussia Dortmund	2–0	0–2 (a.e.t.)
Bologna (Italy)	2–3	(Turkey) Galatasaray	1–1	1–2
Roma (Italy)	1–0	(England) Newcastle United	1–0	0–0
Spartak Moscow (Russia)	2–2 (a)	(England) Leeds United	2–1	0–1
Slavia Prague (Czech Republic)	5–2	(Romania) Steaua București	4–1	1–1
Udinese (Italy)	2–2 (a)	(Germany) Bayer Leverkusen	0–1	2–1
Arsenal (England)	6–3	(France) Nantes	3–0	3–3
Deportivo La Coruña (Spain)	5–3	(Greece) Panathinaikos	4–2	1–1
Parma (Italy)	5–4	(Austria) Sturm Graz	2–1	3–3 (a.e.t.)
Lyon (France)	3–4	(Germany) Werder Bremen	3–0	0–4
Olympiacos (Greece)	3–4	(Italy) Juventus	1–3	2–1
Celta Vigo (Spain)	8–1	(Portugal) Benfica	7–0	1–1
VfL Wolfsburg (Germany)	3–5	(Spain) Atlético Madrid	2–3	1–2
Lens (France)	5–3	(Germany) 1. FC Kaiserslautern	1–2	4–1

=== Fourth round ===
Team 1	Agg.	Team 2	1st leg	2nd leg
Mallorca (Spain)	4–2	(France) Monaco	4–1	0–1
Borussia Dortmund (Germany)	0–2	(Turkey) Galatasaray	0–2	0–0
Roma (Italy)	0–1	(England) Leeds United	0–0	0–1
Slavia Prague (Czech Republic)	2–2 (a)	(Italy) Udinese	1–0	1–2
Arsenal (England)	6–3	(Spain) Deportivo La Coruña	5–1	1–2
Parma (Italy)	2–3	(Germany) Werder Bremen	1–0	1–3
Juventus (Italy)	1–4	(Spain) Celta Vigo	1–0	0–4
Atlético Madrid (Spain)	4–6	(France) Lens	2–2	2–4

=== Quarter-finals ===
Team 1	Agg.	Team 2	1st leg	2nd leg
Leeds United (England)	4–2	(Czech Republic) Slavia Prague	3–0	1–2
Arsenal (England)	6–2	(Germany) Werder Bremen	2–0	4–2
Mallorca (Spain)	2–6	(Turkey) Galatasaray	1–4	1–2
Celta Vigo (Spain)	1–2	(France) Lens	0–0	1–2

=== Semi-finals ===
Team 1	Agg.	Team 2	1st leg	2nd leg
Galatasaray (Turkey)	4–2	(England) Leeds United	2–0	2–2
Arsenal (England)	3–1	(France) Lens	1–0	2–1

=== Final ===
The final was played on 17 May 2000 at the Parken Stadium in Copenhagen, Denmark.

17 May 2000
20:45 UTC+2

Galatasaray (Turkey)	0–0 (a.e.t.)	(England) Arsenal
	Report
Penalties
Ergün (penalty scored); Şükür (penalty scored); Davala (penalty scored); Popescu (penalty scored)	4–1	(penalty missed) Šuker; (penalty scored) Parlour; (penalty missed) Vieira

Parken Stadium, Copenhagen
Attendance: 38,919
Referee: Antonio López Nieto (Spain)

== Top goalscorers ==
Rank	Name	Team	Goals	Minutes played
1	(Federal Republic of Yugoslavia) Darko Kovačević	(Italy) Juventus	10	720'
2	(Italy) Marco Di Vaio	(Italy) Parma	7	460'
2	(Netherlands) Jimmy Floyd Hasselbaink	(Spain) Atlético Madrid	7	574'
2	(France) Thierry Henry	(England) Arsenal	7	592'
2	(France) Pascal Nouma	(France) Lens	7	875'
6	(South Africa) Benni McCarthy	(Spain) Celta Vigo	6	796'
6	(Turkey) Hakan Şükür	(Turkey) Galatasaray	6	833'

== See also ==
- 1999–2000 UEFA Champions League
- 1999 UEFA Intertoto Cup
- 2000 UEFA Cup semi-final violence
