= Sylwester Czereszewski =

Polish footballer

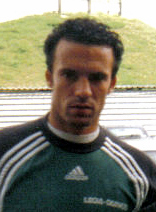

Personal information
- Date of birth: 4 October 1971 (age 55)
- Place of birth: Gołdap, Poland
- Height: 1.83 m (6 ft 0 in)
- Position: Forward

Senior career*
Years	Team	Apps	(Gls)
1988	Korona Klewki		
1989–1992	Stomil Olsztyn		
1992	Gwardia Szczytno		
1993–1996	Stomil Olsztyn	84	(17)
1997–2000	Legia Warsaw	105	(39)
2001	Jiangsu Shuntian	19	(2)
2001–2002	Legia Warsaw	11	(6)
2002–2003	Lech Poznań	18	(5)
2003–2004	Górnik Łęczna	20	(5)
2005–2006	Odra Wodzisław Śląski	7	(0)
2011–2012	Czereś Sport Olsztyn		
2012	Fortuna Dorotowo Gągławki		
2013	Start Nidzica		
2014–2025	Fortuna Gągławki		

International career
1994–1999	Poland	23	(4)

Managerial career
- 2011–2012: Czereś Sport Olsztyn (player-manager)
- 2012: Fortuna Gągławki (player-manager)
- 2013: Start Nidzica (player-manager)
- * Club domestic league appearances and goals

Sylwester Czereszewski (born 4 October 1971) is a Polish former professional footballer who played as a forward or an attacking midfielder. From 1994 to 1999, Czereszewski made 23 appearances and scored four goals for the Poland national team.

== Career statistics ==
=== International ===
Appearances and goals by national team and year
National team	Year	Apps	Goals
Poland
Poland	1994	3	0
Poland	1995	6	1
Poland	1996	2	0
Poland	1997	1	0
Poland	1998	7	3
Poland	1999	4	0
Total		23	4

Scores and results list Poland's goal tally first, score column indicates score after each Czereszewski goal.

List of international goals scored by Sylwester Czereszewski
No.	Date	Venue	Opponent	Score	Result	Competition
1	15 March 1995	Stadion KSZO, Ostrowiec Św., Poland	Lithuania	1–0	4–1	Friendly
2	15 July 1998	Olympic Stadium, Kyiv, Ukraine	Ukraine	2–0	2–1	Friendly
3	6 September 1998	Stadion Lazur, Burgas, Bulgaria	Bulgaria	1–0	3–0	UEFA Euro 2000 qualifying
4	6 September 1998	Stadion Lazur, Burgas, Bulgaria	Bulgaria	2–0	3–0	UEFA Euro 2000 qualifying

== Honours ==
Legia Warsaw

- Ekstraklasa: 2001–02
- Polish Cup: 1996–97
- Polish League Cup: 2001–02
- Polish Super Cup: 1997

Individual

- Polish Newcomer of the Year: 1994
- Ekstraklasa top scorer: 1997–98
