= Issah Moro =

Ghanaian footballer

Issah Umoro
Personal information
- Date of birth: December 24, 1974 (age 51)
- Place of birth: Mampong, Ghana
- Height: 1.82 m (5 ft 11 1/2 in)
- Position: Forward

Senior career*
Years	Team	Apps	(Gls)
- Great Olympics
1996–1997	Dwarfs		
1997–1999	Beltinci	35	(22)
1999–2000	Olimpija	12	(8)
2002–2003	First Vienna		
2003–2005	Livar		
2005–2006	KF Trepça'89		
- * Club domestic league appearances and goals

Issah Umoro (born December 24, 1974) is a Ghanaian retired football forward.

During his career he played with Ghanaian clubs Great Olympics and Dwarfs, before moving to Slovenia where he played for Beltinci and Olimpija. He then moved to Austria, where he played for First Vienna FC, before returning to Slovenia, playing for Livar. He also played for KF Trepça'89 in the Kosovar Superleague.
