= Jocelyn Blanchard =

French footballer (born 1972)

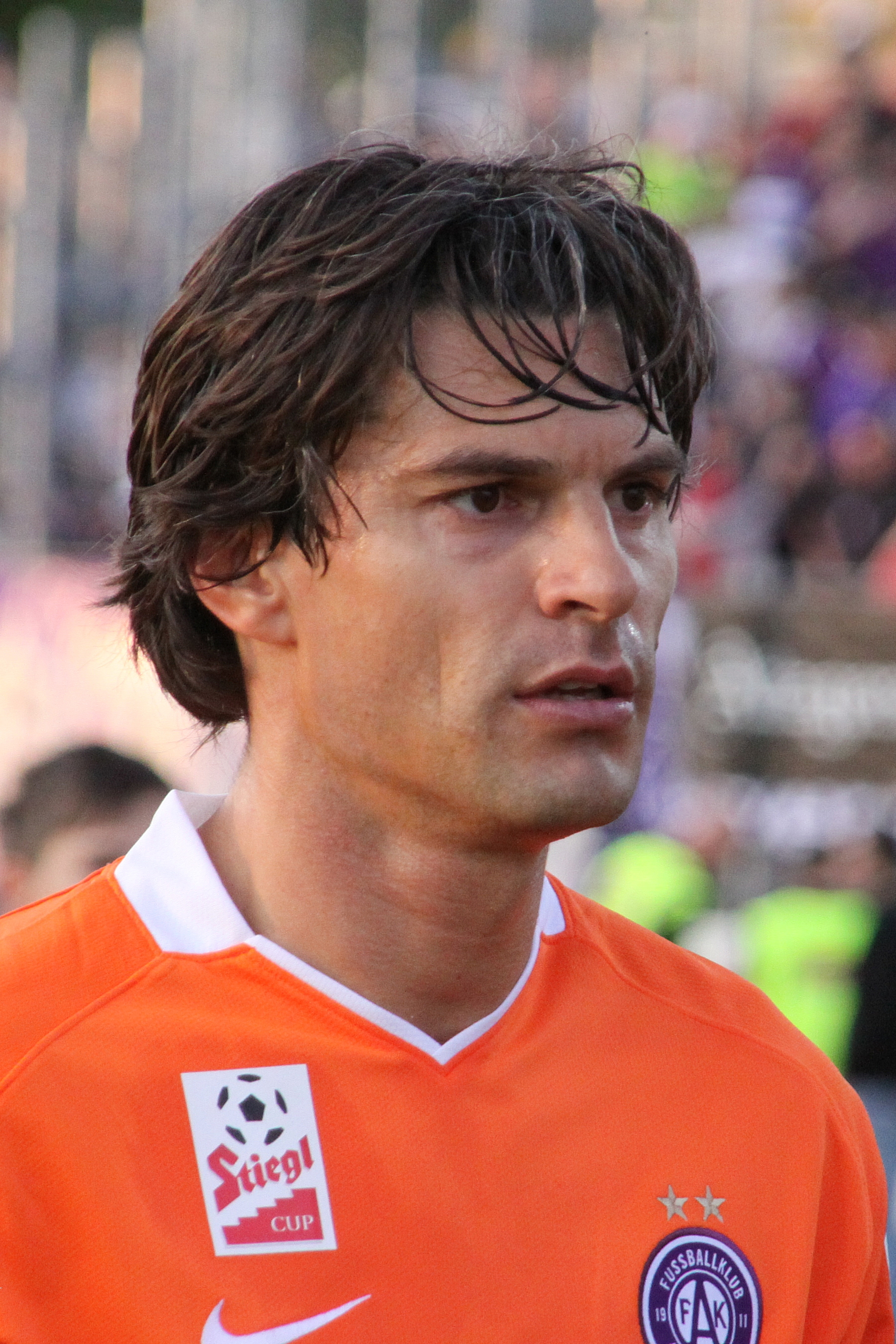
- Blanchard with Austria Wien in 2009

Personal information
- Date of birth: 28 May 1972 (age 54)
- Place of birth: Béthune, France
- Height: 1.82 m (6 ft 0 in)
- Position: Defensive midfielder

Senior career*
Years	Team	Apps	(Gls)
1992–1995	Dunkerque	106	(10)
1995–1998	Metz	108	(9)
1998–1999	Juventus	12	(0)
1999–2003	Lens	127	(3)
2003–2009	Austria Wien	197	(8)
2009–2010	Austria Kärnten	21	(1)
Total		571	(31)
- * Club domestic league appearances and goals

Jocelyn Blanchard (born 28 May 1972) is a French former professional footballer who played as a midfielder.

== Career ==
Blanchard was born in Béthune, Pas-de-Calais.

He started out at Dunkerque in 1992 before joining Metz in 1995. While at Metz he played in the final as they won the 1995–96 Coupe de la Ligue in his first season with the club.

He joined Italian club Juventus in 1998, where he fell out of form and struggled to obtain playing time, collecting only 12 Serie A appearances and 21 across all competitions (six in the Coppa Italia and three in the Champions League) failing to score a goal. He moved back to France in the summer of 1999, joining Lens.

On 5 June 2009, Austria Kärnten signed Blanchard from Austria Wien until June 2010. He was released by Austria Kärnten after the club went into liquidation in 2010.

== Style of play ==
Blanchard was capable of playing in any midfield role due to his ability to contribute both in attack and defence. He primarily played as a defensive midfielder, and his playing style likened to that of compatriot Didier Deschamps earlier in his career. He was an accurate passer of the ball and possessed good technique. He earned a reputation as a key player for his teams, and his main attributes were his tough tackling and stamina.
