= Super Formation Soccer II =

1993 video game

- Cover art
- Developer(s): Human Entertainment
- Publisher(s): Human Entertainment
- Composer(s): Masamichi Yamazaki; Hironori Tanaka; Hideto Maeda
- Series: Super Formation Soccer
- Platform(s): Super Famicom
- Release: JP: June 11, 1993
- Genre(s): Sports (soccer)
- Mode(s): Single-player, multiplayer

Super Formation Soccer II (スーパーフォーメーションサッカー2) is the sequel to the original Super Formation Soccer video game (known as Super Soccer in Europe and North America), which was released exclusively in Japan in 1993. The most significant innovation over its predecessor was the introduction of a four-player mode, and a battery backup to replace the password system used in the original game.

== Reception ==
In Japan, the game topped the Famitsu sales charts in June 1993 and July 1993.

== See also ==
- SNES Multitap
- Super Formation Soccer 94
- Super Formation Soccer 95: della Serie A
- Super Formation Soccer 96: World Club Edition
