= Francesco Totti =

Italian footballer (born 1976)

Francesco Totti OMRI
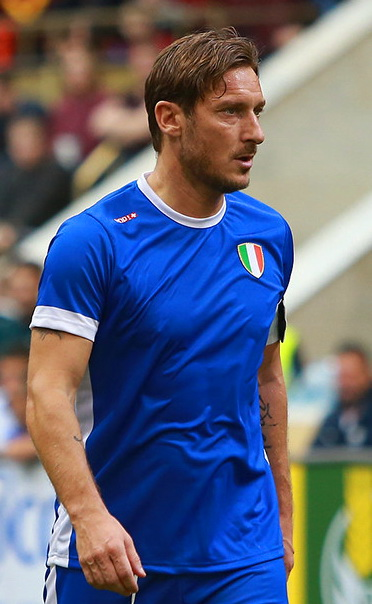
- Totti in a charity match in 2018

Personal information
- Date of birth: 27 September 1976 (age 50)
- Place of birth: Rome, Italy
- Height: 1.80 m (5 ft 11 in)
- Positions: Attacking midfielder; forward

Youth career
- 1983–1985: Fortitudo
- 1985–1986: Trastevere
- 1986–1989: Lodigiani
- 1989–1993: Roma

Senior career*
Years	Team	Apps	(Gls)
1993–2017	Roma	619	(250)

International career
1992	Italy U15	6	(3)
1991–1992	Italy U16	13	(2)
1993–1995	Italy U18	14	(7)
1995–1997	Italy U21	8	(4)
1997	Italy U23	4	(2)
1998–2006	Italy	58	(9)
Medal record
Men's football
Representing Italy
FIFA World Cup
Winner	2006 Germany
UEFA European Championship
Runner-up	2000 Belgium–Netherlands
Mediterranean Games
Winner	1997 Italy
UEFA European Under-21 Championship
Winner	1996 Spain
UEFA European Under-18 Championship
Runner-up	1995 Greece
UEFA European Under-16 Championship
Runner-up	1993 Turkey
- * Club domestic league appearances and goals

Francesco Totti (Note: Italian pronunciation: [franˈtʃesko ˈtɔtti]) (born 27 September 1976) is an Italian former professional footballer who played for Roma and the Italy national team. He was a technically gifted and creative number 10, regarded as one of the greatest in the role, who played as an offensive playmaker (trequartista) and as a forward.

Totti spent his entire club career at Roma, winning a Serie A title, two Coppa Italia titles, and two Supercoppa Italiana titles. With Roma, he scored 307 goals and provided 205 assists across club competitions; in Serie A history, he is the second-highest scorer of all time (250 goals) and the top assist-provider of all time. Totti is the top goalscorer and the most capped player in Roma's history, holds the record for the most goals scored in Serie A while playing for a single club, and also holds the record for the youngest club captain in the history of Serie A. During his career at Roma, Totti has been referred to as Er Bimbo de Oro (The Golden Boy), Er Pupone (The Big Baby), L'Ottavo Re di Roma (The Eighth King of Rome), L'Imperatore (The Emperor) and Er Capitano (The Captain) by the Italian sports media. In 2013, the New York Times described him as a "Roman god in his game."

Totti experienced global success on the world stage winning the 2006 FIFA World Cup and appearing in the finals of UEFA Euro 2000 with Italy; he was selected in the All-Star team for both tournaments. Totti also represented his country at the 2002 World Cup and Euro 2004. Previously, he played with Italy youth teams, scoring 18 goals and winning the 1996 UEFA European Under-21 Championship and the 1997 Mediterranean Games. With the senior Italy national team, he scored 9 goals and provided 25 assists in 58 appearances. He is the top Italian assist-provider in FIFA World Cup history (6 assists). In 2007 due to recurring physical problems, Totti announced his international retirement to focus solely on club play with Roma.

Totti won the 2007 European Golden Shoe and a record eleven awards from the Italian Footballers' Association: five Serie A Italian Footballer of the Year awards, two Serie A Footballer of the Year awards, two Serie A Goal of the Year awards, one Serie A Goalscorer of the Year award, and one Serie A Young Footballer of the Year award. He was also awarded the 2010 Golden Foot and was selected in the European Sports Media team of the season three times. In 2004, he was named in the FIFA 100, a list of the world's greatest living players as selected by Pelé, as part of FIFA's centenary celebrations. In 2011, Totti was recognised by IFFHS as the most popular footballer in Europe. In 2015, France Football rated him as one of the ten-best footballers in the world who are over age 36. Following his retirement in 2017, Totti was awarded the Player's Career Award and the UEFA President's Award.

== Early life ==
Totti was born in Rome to parents Lorenzo and Fiorella Totti. He was raised in the Porta Metronia neighbourhood. As a youngster he idolised ex-Roma captain Giuseppe Giannini, and regularly played football with older boys. Totti began to play youth team football in 1984, with Fortitudo, later joining Trastevere and Lodigiani. After he came to the attention of scouts, his mother refused a lucrative offer from Milan in order to keep him in his home town. Although his youth club initially had come to an agreement to sell Totti to the Lazio youth side, one of Roma's youth coaches, Gildo Giannini, persuaded his parents to let him join the Roma youth squad in 1989.

== Club career ==
=== Roma ===
==== 1992–1997: Early seasons ====
After three years in the youth team, Totti made his first appearance for Roma's senior side in Serie A at the age of 16, when coach Vujadin Boškov called him up in the 2–0 away victory against Brescia on 28 March 1993. In the following season under Carlo Mazzone, Totti began to play more regularly as a second striker, and scored his first goal on 4 September 1994 in a 1–1 draw against Foggia. By 1995, Totti had become a regular in Roma's starting line-up and scored 16 goals during the next three seasons, while creating several more, as his talent was praised by his manager Mazzone.

Following Mazzone's sacking in the summer of 1996 and the departure of Giannini, Totti was expected to play a more prominent role, after several promising seasons; however, the team underperformed during the 1996–97 season, while Totti struggled to gain playing time under new manager Carlos Bianchi, and was even set to leave for Sampdoria on loan in January 1997. Roma's chairman at the time however, Franco Sensi, impeded the transfer, leading to further tensions with the manager, who eventually parted ways with the club.

==== 1997–1999: Roma's number 10 and captain ====
Totti's years under Zdeněk Zeman represented a period of both physical and mental maturation as a player. From a technical and tactical standpoint, he proved to be compatible on the left wing in the rigid formations of the Bohemian coach, as his new role gave him more space to take on defenders in one on one situations, and cut into the centre to shoot on goal with his stronger foot; he also became physically more powerful, fit, hard-working, and complete. He displayed a greater responsibility for the team, and was presented with the number 10 jersey. His first season under Zeman started well, with Totti taking advantage of a 4–3–3 formation and making his breakthrough with the club. He finished the league season reaching double figures in goals scored for the first time in his career; including a goal in the club's 2–0 away win against Napoli on 22 February 1998, Totti scored 13 goals in Serie A in total, and contributed to Roma's fourth place league finish that year. Although he was not called up for the 1998 FIFA World Cup by Italy manager Cesare Maldini, his consistent performances, creativity and goalscoring throughout the course of the previous Serie A season saw him being awarded the Guerin d'Oro for the 1997–98 season, given to him for having achieved the highest average rating of any Serie A player. The following season, he began to gain recognition as a club symbol and as a leader, and on 31 October 1998, Totti became the team captain. This made him the youngest Serie A club captain ever at 22, inheriting the armband from Aldair. On 29 November 1998, Totti scored the equalising goal in a 3–3 draw against cross-city rivals Lazio; this was his first ever goal in the Rome Derby. Overall, he scored 30 goals and provided 26 assists during Zeman's two-year managerial stint. For his performances, he was named the Serie A Young Footballer of the Year for the 1998–99 season.

==== 1999–2004: The Scudetto as a playmaker ====
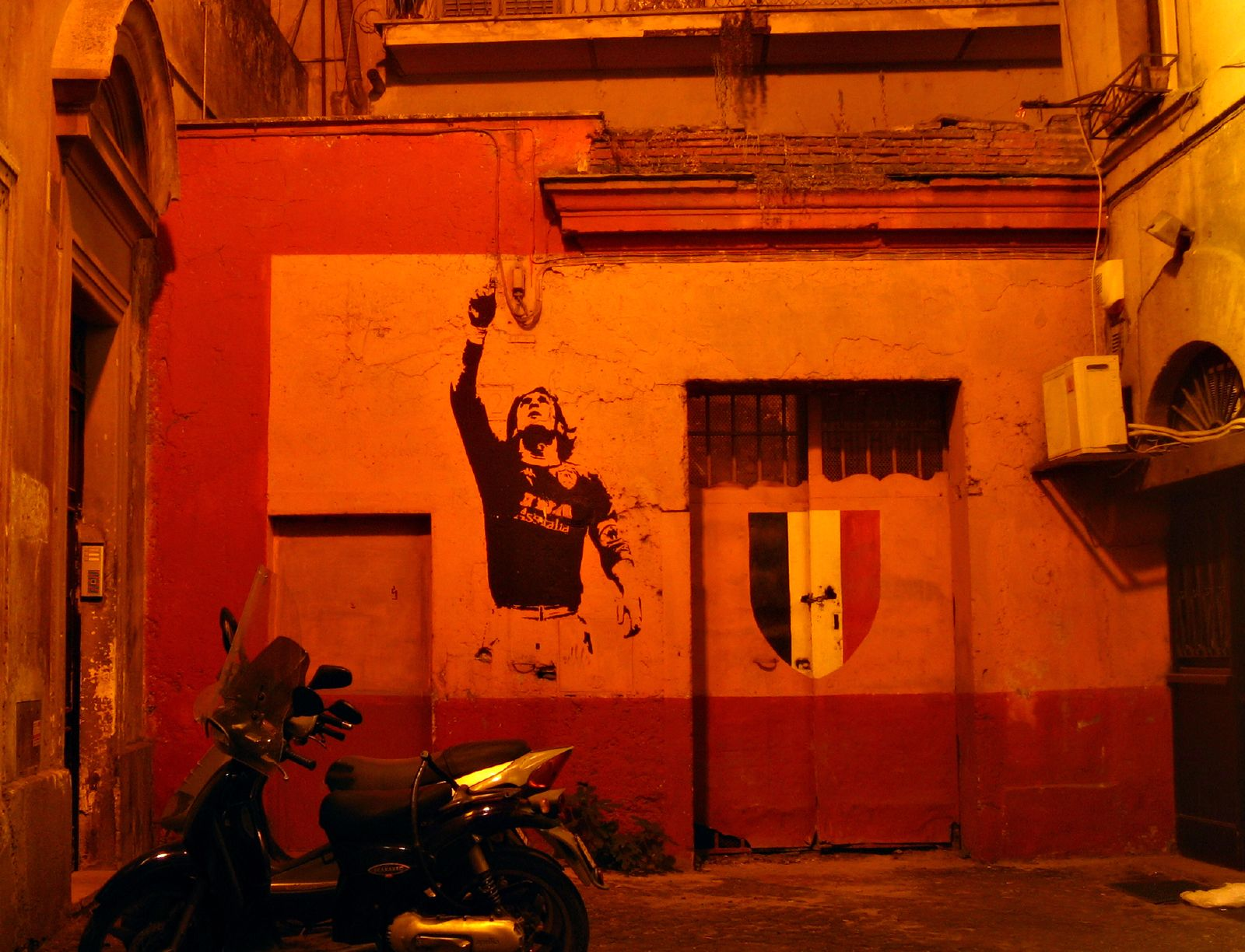
Decal of Totti alongside the Scudetto shield, displayed on a house in Rome

In June 1999, Roma's then-president Franco Sensi sacked Zeman and signed Fabio Capello as a replacement, with the aim of winning the league title. By the 2000–01 campaign under the new coach, Roma were building a competitive team around Totti, who was by now being utilised as a creative attacking midfielder by Capello in a 3–4–1–2 formation, due to his passing skills and playmaking abilities. Totti scored in a 2–0 home win over Bologna on his season debut on 1 October 2000. On 10 December, Totti scored the match-winning goal in a 2–1 home win against Udinese, with a powerful left-footed volley to help Roma to their fifth home win of the season. He continued his goalscoring form by scoring against Napoli at home in a 3–0 victory on 28 January 2001, as Roma finished the first half of the league season in first place. Totti continued to play an important role in keeping the club at the top of the table throughout the remainder of the season, gaining a comfortable lead over rivals Juventus. On 17 June 2001, at the Stadio Olimpico, Roma beat Parma 3–1, with their three main attackers, Totti, Vincenzo Montella and Gabriel Batistuta scoring one goal each, as Roma were crowned champions of Italy for the third time in their history. Totti finished the league season with 13 goals, equalling what was at the time his personal goalscoring record in a single Serie A season.

On 19 August 2001, Totti won his first Supercoppa Italiana, scoring and assisting in the 3–0 win against Fiorentina. Totti was named the Serie A Italian Footballer of the Year for both 2000 and 2001, and won the Serie A Footballer of the Year Award for the first time in his career in 2000. He received his first Ballon d'Or nomination in 2000, finishing 14th in voting, and fifth the following year. Due to his performances and leadership, Totti had established himself as a hero to the Roma fans, who were also able to identify with his background as a Rome native and lifelong supporter.

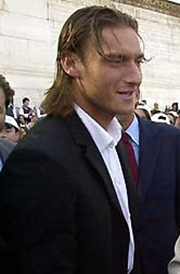
Totti in 2002

Over the following seasons, Totti played in a free role as either a forward or second striker in a 3–5–2 formation, often alongside either Batistuta or the newly acquired youngster Antonio Cassano. He scored his first hat-trick in Serie A, in a 3–2 away win over Brescia on 30 September 2002. Totti also scored the only goal in Roma's decisive 1–0 victory at the Santiago Bernabéu against Real Madrid on 30 October 2002; this was the first time in 35 years that an Italian team had won a match in Madrid. He continued his goalscoring exploits against Valencia, scoring two goals in a 3–0 win. Despite this, Roma only finished third in their Champions League group, and in eighth position in Serie A, although they managed to reach the 2003 Coppa Italia final. In the final against Milan, Totti scored three times from free kicks over both legs (one goal at home and two at the San Siro), but Roma lost out to Milan 6–3 on aggregate. In 2003, Totti won his second Serie A Footballer of the Year Award.

In the 2003–04 season, Totti played a key role, as Roma finished runner-up to Milan in the Scudetto race. Throughout the league season, he scored 20 goals, his best haul in Serie A up to that point, which allowed him to win his second Guerin d'Oro, as the player with the best average rating in Serie A throughout the season. Moreover, the Roma captain notably scored trademark chipped goals on two occasions throughout the season, against Brescia and Empoli.

==== 2004–2009: Transition to striker ====
Despite Roma's disappointing 2004–05 season, which saw the departure of a number of players and several managerial changes, Totti maintained consistent form by scoring twelve goals in Serie A, and 15 in all competitions, among which was his 100th Serie A goal from a free kick in a 3–3 draw against Inter Milan, on 3 October 2004. Two months later, on 19 December, he became Roma's all-time leading scorer in Serie A after netting his 107th career league goal against Parma, breaking the record previously held by Roberto Pruzzo. Although Roma finished the league season in eighth place, Totti helped the team reach the 2005 Coppa Italia final; however Roma lost to Inter.

Roma's new coach for the 2005–06 season, Luciano Spalletti, went with a 4–2–3–1 formation, deploying Totti in a newer, more offensive role as a lone striker. Despite his new attacking role, Totti usually dropped deep to pick up the ball in midfield rather than operating in the penalty area, thus creating space for the attacking midfielders and wingers to making offensive runs; the resulting system was later described as a 4–6–0, while Totti's particular attacking role was dubbed the "false 9". In this new position, Totti continued to score frequently, managing 15 goals in 24 league matches. In the spring of 2005, he renewed his contract until 2010, with an annual salary of €5.4 million. On 19 February 2006, he suffered a fracture of his left fibula and ligament damage during a match against Empoli, after being fouled by Richard Vanigli. Totti was at risk of missing the 2006 World Cup, but returned to the side on 11 May 2006 as a substitute in Roma's 3–1 Coppa Italia final defeat to Inter. A metal plate had been attached to his ankle during surgery, but doctors decided not to operate again and remove it following Totti's return, concurring that the plate would not affect his game. He was given off-label treatments of teriparatide to speed-up his fracture recovery.

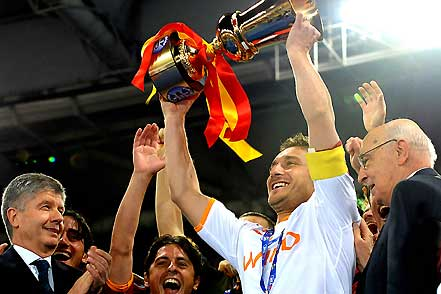
Totti lifts the 2007–08 Coppa Italia trophy presented to him by President of Italy Giorgio Napolitano (right).

The 2006–07 season was a personal high for Totti, as he scored 26 goals in Serie A, as well as another six between the Champions League (scoring three times in the group stage and once in the round of 16 tie against Lyon) and the Coppa Italia, in addition to 15 assists in 50 games across all competitions. Despite their elimination from the Champions League by Manchester United in the quarter-finals, and a second-place finish in the league, Roma won the Coppa Italia final against league champions Inter with a 6–2 victory at home (Totti scored the opening goal after 50 seconds) and a 2–1 defeat at the San Siro in Milan. Totti finished the season as Serie A top scorer with 26 goals, and on 17 June, he also received the ESM European Golden Shoe award as the top European goalscorer of the season. Despite being the highest active goalscorer in Serie A, he was not among the finalists for the 2007 FIFA World Player of the Year due to his absence from the national team, although he was nominated for the 2007 Ballon d'Or, finishing tenth in the voting.

On 19 August 2007, Totti contributed to Roma's 1–0 victory over Inter in the 2007 Supercoppa Italiana, winning a penalty which was subsequently converted by Daniele De Rossi. Totti scored his 200th goal for Roma in a 4–0 victory against Torino in the Coppa Italia, on 16 January 2008. He was named the Serie A Italian Footballer of the Year for the fifth time in his career on 28 January. The following month, on 24 February, he reached 386 appearances in Serie A with Roma in a match against Fiorentina, equalling the club appearance record previously held by Giacomo Losi, Roma's captain in the 1960s. He broke the record on 27 February, in the club's following league match against Inter. On 9 March, he reached his 500th overall appearance for Roma, scoring the second goal of the match from a penalty kick in a 2–0 away win over Napoli. Totti suffered a season-ending injury to his right knee during a 1–1 draw with Livorno on 19 April. Tests revealed a tear of his anterior cruciate ligament (ACL) that required surgery, ruling him out for four months. Roma won their ninth Coppa Italia with a 2–1 victory over Inter on 24 May; although Totti did not play the match, he was still allowed to lift the cup as the team's captain. With this win, Totti became the most successful captain in the club's history, with five titles and ten runners-up medals.

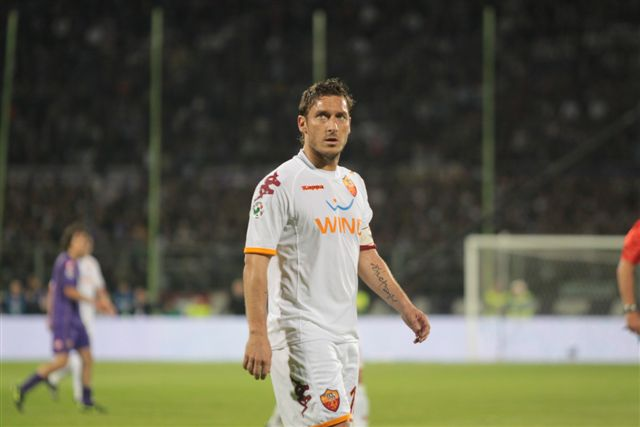
Totti playing against Fiorentina in 2009 during the final year of Spalletti's first spell with Roma

In the 2008–09 season, Totti recovered from the previous injury, and took part in the 2008 Supercoppa Italiana final on 24 August 2008; following a 2–2 draw with Inter after extra-time, Totti missed his penalty in the resulting shootout, which allowed Javier Zanetti to win the match for Inter with the following spot-kick. On 8 November 2008, he made his 400th appearance in Serie A, in a 1–1 away draw against Bologna, scoring the opening goal of the match. Later that month, he went on to help his team beat Lazio in the Rome derby, assisting Júlio Baptista's match-winning goal. Totti's run of good form continued as he provided assists for Mirko Vučinić, and scored a lobbed goal in a 3–0 win in a league game against Lecce on 23 November, while he netted a free kick in a 3–1 away win against CFR Cluj in the Champions League later that week, on 27 November. He also scored the second goal in a 2–0 win against Bordeaux on 10 December, which ensured Roma's passage to the round of 16 of the competition as group winners. On 19 April 2009, Totti scored his 175th Serie A goal in a 3–2 home win over Lecce, overtaking Amedeo Amadei as Roma's all-time highest goalscorer; with the goal, Totti also became one of the top-ten goalscorers in Serie A history.

==== 2009–2011: Struggles and return to form ====
Roma's difficult start to the 2008–09 season and continued struggles at the start of the 2009–10 season saw Spalletti resign after a four-year reign, and he was replaced by Claudio Ranieri. Totti performed well in the inaugural UEFA Europa League; he scored two hat-tricks in the competition that season, first in a 7–1 away win against Gent in the third qualifying round and then another in the same scoreline against MFK Košice at the Stadio Olimpico in the play-off round. In Serie A, he also scored three goals against Bari on 22 November 2009, seven years on from his last hat-trick in Serie A. Eight days later, Totti confirmed he had signed a new five-year playing contract, which would see him stay at the club until 2014, after which he stated he would become a club director for a further five years. Roma offered him an annual salary of €8.9 million for 2009–10 and €8.6 million a year for the next four seasons.

With a 24-match unbeaten run in Serie A, Roma became the only challengers to Inter in the last three rounds for the league title that season, ultimately finishing as runner-up following the final game. Despite suffering several injury problems, Totti surpassed former prolific strikers such as Gabriel Batistuta, Giuseppe Signori, and Kurt Hamrin, putting him in sixth place in the all-time Serie A scoring records. Totti played in the Coppa Italia final against Inter on 5 May 2010, but received a red card in the closing minutes of the second half for kicking Mario Balotelli; Roma lost the match 0–1, failing to bring home a record tenth Coppa Italia title.

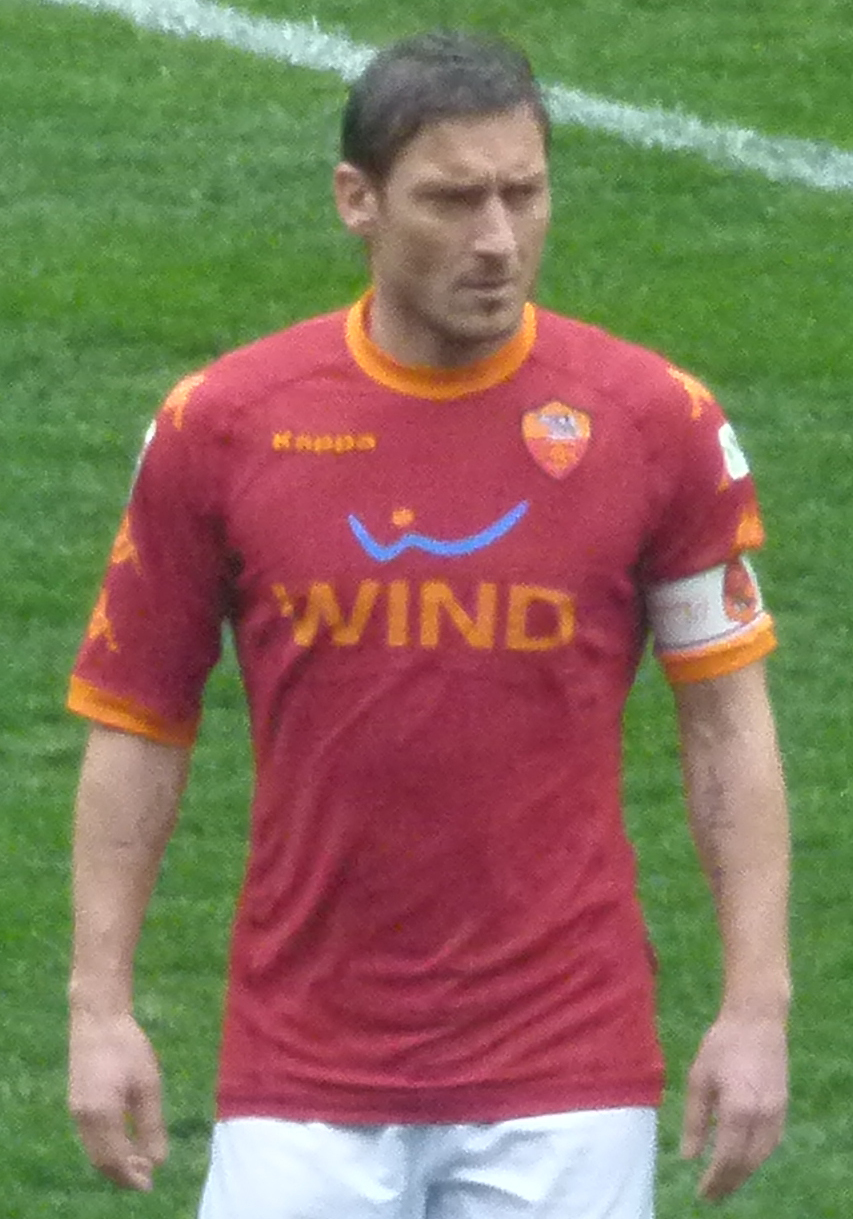
Totti playing for Roma in 2011

In the 2010–11 season, Roma suffered yet another defeat to Inter in the 2010 Supercoppa Italiana, continuing their "traditional" early struggles, which Totti partly blamed on Ranieri's defensive mindset and failure to develop a consistent set of tactics. On a personal level, Totti won the Golden Foot award, but Ranieri's lack of faith in him due to his age meant that the captain would spend a lot of time on the substitute's bench in favour of younger forwards, such as Marco Borriello, Mirko Vučinić and Jérémy Ménez. His limited playing time, which included a controversial 91st minute substitution in a 2–1 away loss against Sampdoria, resulted in several clashes with Ranieri, and saw him fall out of form, scoring only three league goals in 21 appearances; as a result of his limited appearances, despondence and strenuous relationship with the manager, rumours even circulated in the media that Totti was considering leaving Roma. Following Roma's 4–3 loss against Genoa on 20 February 2011, Ranieri resigned as manager, with Totti's former teammate Vincenzo Montella appointed as caretaker coach.

Montella reverted to Spalletti's 4–2–3–1 system and Totti appeared to recapture his best form, finding the net more frequently towards the end of the season. On 3 March, Totti was voted the best active Italian player in a poll conducted by La Gazzetta dello Sport; 100 Italian personalities including footballers, politicians and celebrities took part in the vote. On 13 March 2011, he scored two goals against Lazio which gave Roma their fifth consecutive victory in the Rome derby. The following match, on 20 March, Totti became the sixth player in Serie A history to score 200 goals, finding the target twice in a 2–2 draw against Fiorentina to total 201 league goals. On 1 May, Totti scored a brace against Bari to equal and subsequently overtake Roberto Baggio as the fifth-highest goalscorer in Serie A with his 205th and 206th career league goals, putting him behind only Silvio Piola, Gunnar Nordahl, Giuseppe Meazza and José Altafini. Totti ended the 2010–11 Serie A campaign with 15 goals – with twelve of his goals coming in Roma's last 13 league fixtures.

At the end of the season, Roma underwent a change of ownership, with the former club owner Rosella Sensi being replaced by an American consortium led by Thomas DiBenedetto. Under the new management, the club did not offer a permanent contract to Montella, which led to him leaving to coach another Serie A side, Catania. The new management appointed Luis Enrique, who had previous coached the Barcelona B side, in a bid to emulate Barcelona's football style.

==== 2011–2012: Back to playmaker ====
The 2011–12 season saw Totti initially receive few starts under Roma's new manager Luis Enrique, as the club's early struggles continued. Totti sustained an injury on 1 October 2011 in the second half of a match against Atalanta, which kept him out of action until 20 November; he returned to the pitch against Lecce, when he came off the bench in the 66th minute, as Roma won the match 2–1.

In mid-December, as Totti began regaining form post-injury, he started playing more regularly, often in a creative role as an attacking midfielder. On 12 December, he set up Daniele De Rossi's opening goal in a 1–1 home draw against eventual league champions Juventus, although Totti missed a second-half penalty during the match. He provided several more assists that season, notably for Dani Osvaldo's goal in Roma's 3–1 win over Napoli at the Stadio San Paolo on 18 December 2011, and also set up De Rossi's goal against Catania at the Massimino stadium. Playing in a deeper position on the pitch, the Roma talisman did not seek to score goals as often, opting rather to play more of a supporting role by bridging the gap between attack and midfield, using his presence, leadership and experience in games to offer some much needed depth to the team.

On 8 January 2012, Totti scored his first goals of the season in a 2–0 win against Chievo, converting one penalty in the first half and another in the second. He went on to score two goals in a 5–1 win against Cesena which allowed Totti to set a new record, as his second goal of the match brought his tally to 211 league goals – the most any player has ever scored for a single club in Serie A. Despite his inability to find the back of the net as the second half of the season began, he continued to perform well, as he notably assisted Juan's goal from a corner in Roma's 4–0 win over Inter on 5 February. On 12 April, Totti scored his fifth goal of the season in a 3–1 victory over Udinese. He scored again in a 2–1 loss against Fiorentina on 25 April, and two weeks later, on his 500th match in Serie A, he scored two goals in a 2–2 draw against Catania at the Stadio Olimpico.

==== 2012–2013: Breaking records ====
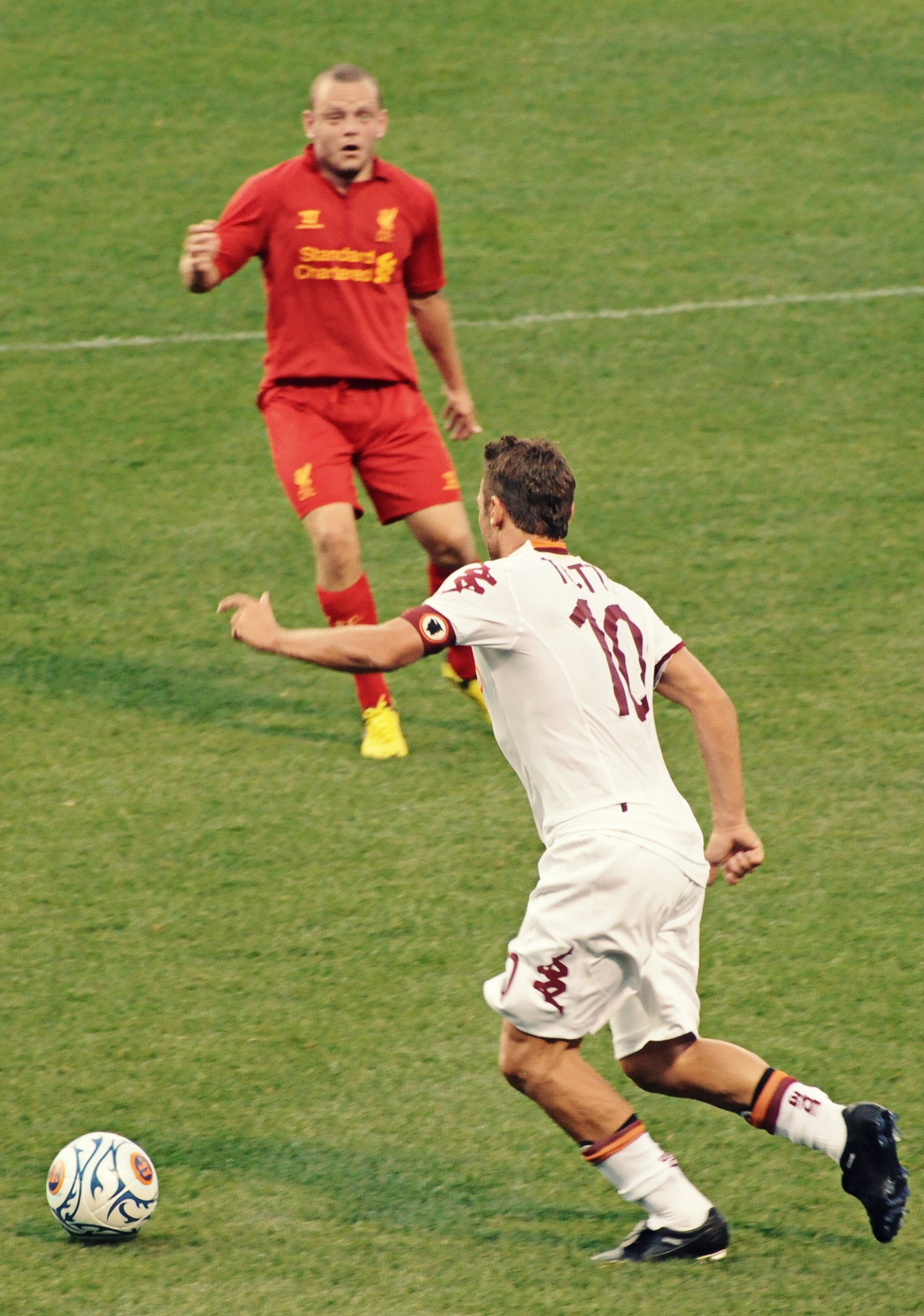
Totti in action during a 2012 friendly match against Liverpool in Boston, Massachusetts

After Luis Enrique decided to resign due to an unsuccessful season in which Roma failed to qualify for European football for the first time in 15 years, the club decided to appoint their former manager Zdeněk Zeman, with whom Totti would once again be reunited. Zeman tried to play Totti in a free role as a left forward or winger in his preferred 4–3–3 tactical line-up. Although this was a similar role to that which he had played during Zeman's previous spell 13 years before, Totti's freedom also enabled him to drop deep into the midfield to press opponents and pick up the ball, as well as attacking on the left wing. On 2 September, Totti provided two assists for Alessandro Florenzi and Dani Osvaldo in Roma's 3–1 win over Inter at the San Siro. After the match, he received praise from the media due to his performance, even as he approached his 36th birthday. On 21 October, Totti surpassed both Giuseppe Meazza and José Altafini's joint-record after scoring the first of Roma's goals in a 4–2 away win at Genoa, becoming the third-highest scorer in Serie A history with 217 goals. On 8 December, Totti scored two goals, his fifth and sixth of the season, in a 4–2 home victory against Fiorentina.

Following the club's negative performances, Zeman was sacked and replaced by the club's technique coach Aurelio Andreazzoli in early February 2013. Under his new manager, Totti scored a goal against Juventus on 16 February, with a powerful strike, as Roma shocked the league leaders in a 1–0 win. On 3 March, he scored his 225th goal against Genoa to become Serie A's joint second-top scorer – alongside Gunnar Nordahl – as Roma cruised to a 3–1 victory. Totti finally broke Nordahl's record by scoring against Parma on 18 March, increasing his Serie A tally to 226 goals. On 8 April, with a goal from a penalty kick in the 1–1 draw against Lazio, he became the joint top scorer of all time in Serie A in the Rome Derby with nine goals, putting him on par with Dino da Costa and Marco Delvecchio. Totti finished the 2012–13 Serie A season with 12 goals and 12 assists from 34 appearances. Totti also reached the 2013 Coppa Italia final with Roma, but lost the match 0–1 on 26 May to cross-city rivals Lazio.

==== 2013–2015: Free forward ====
With the arrival of Roma's new coach Rudi Garcia in the summer of 2013, Totti was once again deployed as a false 9, while also functioning as a supporting forward, or as winger on the left on occasion. On 20 September 2013, Roma announced that Totti had signed a new contract, keeping him at the club until 2016, past his 39th birthday. He scored his first goal of the 2013–14 season on 16 September, against Parma in a 3–1 victory. He followed up the goal with two strikes in Roma's 3–0 away victory over Inter, helping the team maintain a 100% record after seven games. On 20 November, he received the "Captain of Captains" award by the association Editutto and Baker Tilly Revisa.

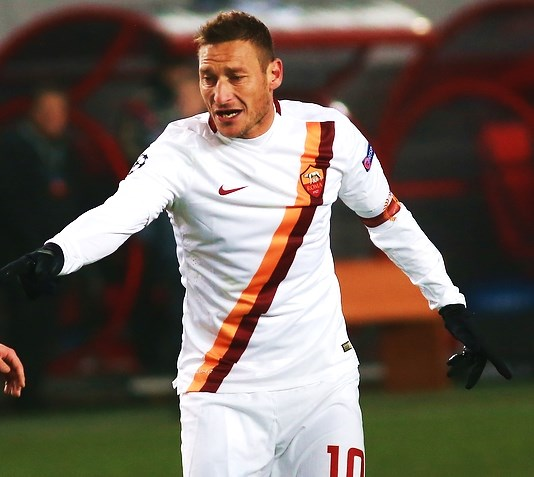
Totti in 2014 playing for Roma against CSKA Moscow in the UEFA Champions League

On 14 February, Totti was sidelined for about a month after sustaining a bruised right buttock. He returned to the pitch on 17 March against Udinese, scoring the first goal of the match as he helped his team to a 3–2 win. Eight days later, Totti celebrated 700 overall appearances with Roma against Torino. On 2 April, he scored his 20th career goal against Parma (a personal record against any side) in a 4–2 victory. He finished the season with eight goals and ten assists, ending the year as the top assist provider of the 2013–14 Serie A season.

Prior to the start of the 2014–15 season, Totti had been one of the star players of Roma's pre-season friendlies. On 30 September 2014, three days after his 38th birthday, Totti scored Roma's equaliser in a Champions League group stage draw at Manchester City, thus becoming the oldest scorer in the UEFA Champions League era; before Pepe broke his record in 2023. It was also Totti's 300th professional career goal. On 25 October, Totti scored the opening goal from a free kick in a 1–1 draw against CSKA Moscow, extending his record of being the oldest goalscorer in the history of the competition to 38 years and 59 days.

On 11 January 2015, Totti scored two goals against local rivals Lazio, making him the joint all-time top scorer in the Rome derby in official club competitions, alongside Dino Da Costa, with eleven goals, as well as the Serie A top scorer in the Rome derby. On 9 May, Totti scored from a penalty in a 2–1 away defeat to Milan, equalling Roberto Baggio for the record of the most goals scored in Serie A from penalties (68). On 31 May, in the final match-day of the 2014–15 season, he scored his 299th goal for Roma in a 2–1 home defeat to Palermo. Totti finished the season as Roma's leading scorer with ten goals in all competitions, the seventh time in which he had been the team's top scorer.

==== 2015–2017: Final years as a super sub ====
On his second league appearance of the 2015–16 Serie A season, Totti scored his 300th career club goal in all competitions with Roma in a 2–2 home draw with Sassuolo, on 20 September 2015. On 26 September 2015, the day before his 39th birthday, he sustained an injury, straining his right hip flexor in a 5–1 win over Carpi, ruling him out for three months. He returned to the pitch as a substitute in a 1–1 home draw against Milan, on 9 January 2016, equalling Gianluca Pagliuca as the third all-time highest appearance holder in Serie A history, with 592 appearances.

On 21 February 2016, Totti publicly criticised returning manager – and Rudi Garcia's replacement – Luciano Spalletti in the media for his lack of playing time since his return from injury. He was subsequently dropped for Roma's 5–0 win over Palermo, with the decision causing an uproar among the fans and in the media, while rumours once again began to circulate that Totti would be leaving the club once his contract had expired at the end of the season, as a result of his limited appearances and clashes with Spalletti. On 8 March, Totti came on as a substitute for Stephan El Shaarawy in the return leg of the round of 16 of the UEFA Champions League against Real Madrid, and was given a standing ovation by the fans at the Santiago Bernabéu in Madrid; Roma lost the match 2–0, however, and were eliminated from the competition following a 4–0 aggregate loss. On 20 April, he came off the bench in the 86th minute, one goal down to Torino at home to rescue the team with a brace; one in the 87th minute and a penalty in the 89th minute to win the match 3–2. With his 69th goal in Serie A from the penalty spot, he overtook Roberto Baggio as the outright top scorer of penalties in Serie A history. Totti's double also made him the oldest player in Serie A history to score two goals in a single league match, at the age of 39 years, 6 months and 23 days, breaking Silvio Piola's previous record of 39 years, 4 months and 2 days, which he had managed with Novara on 1 February 1953, after scoring a brace against his former team Lazio.

On 2 May, Totti came off the bench and scored from a free kick to help Roma to come from behind and achieve a 3–2 away win over Genoa; this was his 21st goal from a free kick in Serie A, which put him alongside Baggio as the joint all-time fourth-highest scorer of free kicks in Serie A history, behind only Alessandro Del Piero, Andrea Pirlo, and Siniša Mihajlović. Totti came off the bench in each of the past five Serie A games and contributed four goals and an assist. On 8 May, Totti came off the bench to set up Roma's final goal in a 3–0 home win over Chievo in his 600th Serie A appearance, becoming the third player ever to reach this milestone. Overall, Totti only made 13 league appearances throughout the season but scored four goals in the final six matches as a substitute. On 7 June, he renewed his contract for another year, stating that he would be retiring at the end of the 2016–17 season; he also revealed he had signed a six-year contract to become Roma's technical director once the season ended.

On his first appearance of the 2016–17 season against Sampdoria on 11 September, Totti equalled Paolo Maldini's record of playing in 25 Serie A seasons. With Roma trailing 2–1 at half time, Totti came off the bench and assisted Edin Džeko's temporary equaliser, later also scoring the match-winning goal from a penalty in injury time to secure a 3–2 home win in Serie A; Totti's goal meant that he had managed to score at least once in each of the past 23 consecutive seasons of his career. On 25 September, he scored his 250th Serie A goal from the penalty spot in a 3–1 away defeat to Torino, just two days before his 40th birthday. On his first start two days after his 40th birthday, on 29 September, Totti was praised for his performance and longevity in a 4–0 home win over Astra Giurgiu in the Europa League; he played all 90 minutes of the match, providing two assists, while also being involved in a third goal. On 20 October, Totti made his 100th appearance in UEFA club competitions, setting up two goals in a 3–3 home draw against Austria Wien in the Europa League. In late October, he sustained a muscle injury to the flexor of his left thigh during a training session, which ruled him out indefinitely. He returned to action as a substitute in a 3–2 home win over Pescara on 27 November.

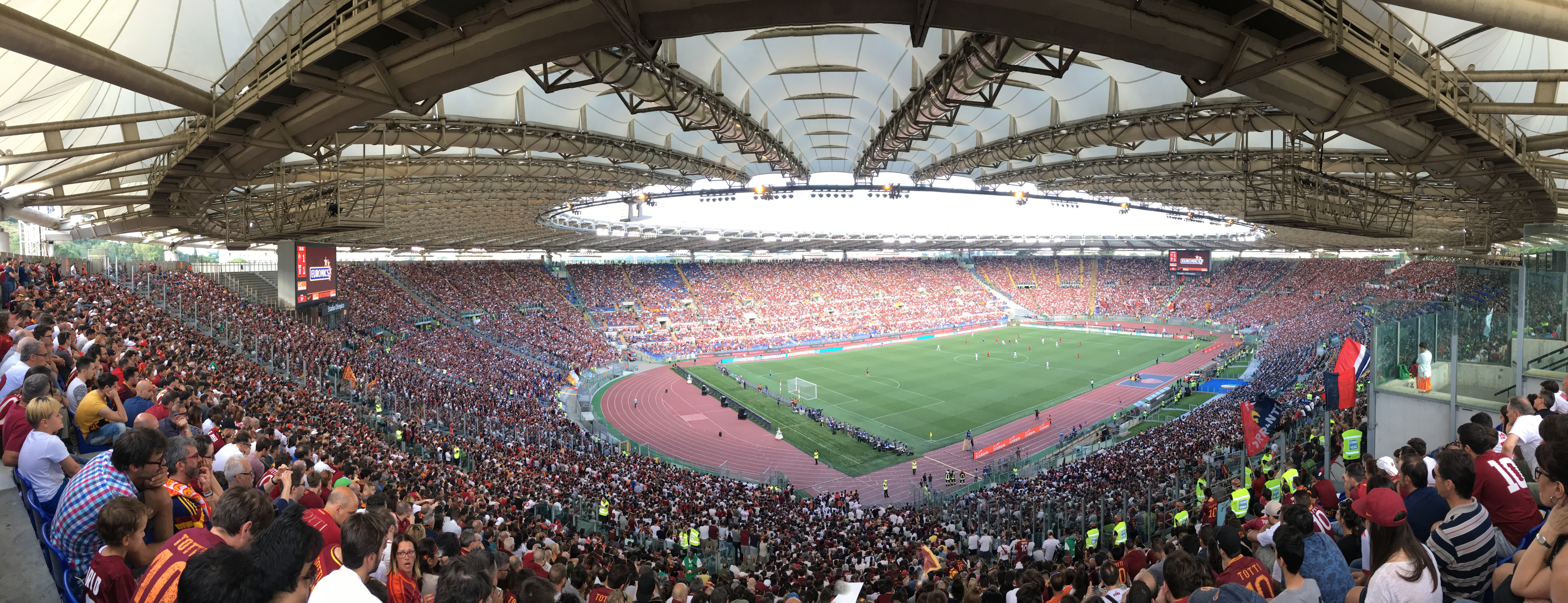
The Stadio Olimpico, on the day of Totti's last official match

On 1 February 2017, Totti scored a decisive injury-time penalty in the 97th minute of a 2–1 home victory against Cesena in the Coppa Italia quarter-finals; the win enabled Roma to advance to the semi-finals of the tournament. On 15 April, he came on as a substitute in a 1–1 home draw against Atalanta to make his 615th appearance in Serie A, equalling Javier Zanetti as the joint third highest appearance holder of all time in Serie A.

On 28 May, Totti made his final appearance for Roma in a 3–2 home win against Genoa, coming on as a substitute for Mohamed Salah in the 54th minute, and received a standing ovation from the fans.

== International career ==
=== Youth career and early senior career ===
Totti first came into international prominence while playing in FIFA and UEFA youth tournaments. With the Italy under-16 side, under manager Sergio Vatta, Totti reached the final of the 1993 UEFA European Under-16 Championship in Turkey; Italy were defeated 1–0 by Poland, as Totti missed the final due to suspension. Four months later, Totti played in 1993 FIFA U-17 World Championship in Japan and scored Italy's goal in the tournament as the Azzurrini were eliminated in group stage. Totti also scored in Italy's 4–1 defeat to Spain in the final of the UEFA Under-18 Championship, in July 1995. He subsequently won the UEFA European Under-21 Championship with Italy in 1996, under manager Cesare Maldini; in the final, he opened the scoring as the match ended in a 1–1 draw against Spain, although Italy were able to win the final on penalties. The following year, he also played a key role in helping Italy to win a gold medal at the 1997 Mediterranean Games, on home soil, scoring twice throughout the tournament. Due to his contribution in these tournaments, Totti was later included in the all-time Under-21 Euro dream team in 2015.

After starring with the Azzurrini in Italy's under-16, under-19 and under-21 sides, Totti earned his first senior cap for Italy under the recently appointed international manager Dino Zoff during a 2–0 Euro 2000 qualifying victory against Switzerland on 10 October 1998. Totti scored his first goal for Italy on 26 April 2000 in a 2–0 friendly win over Portugal in Reggio Calabria. He scored his first brace for Italy in a 2006 FIFA World Cup qualification match in a 4–3 home win over Belarus, on 13 October 2004. In total, Totti made 58 appearances for Italy between 1998 and 2006, scoring nine goals and providing 25 assists.

=== Euro 2000 ===
Totti (right) celebrates alongside teammate Alessandro Del Piero at Euro 2000. Totti's performances through the tournament earned him the number 10 shirt of Italy.

Italy went to Euro 2000 with Totti in excellent form. He scored two goals during the tournament. His first goal of the tournament came against co-host nation Belgium in the first round, as Totti headed in Demetrio Albertini's cross from a set-piece; he was named man of the match for his performance. His second goal of the tournament came against Romania in the quarter-finals, with an accurate strike following Stefano Fiore's assist. In Italy's semi-final shootout victory over co-hosts the Netherlands, Totti's confidently chipped penalty was named as one of the "magic moments" of the tournament. A few moments before taking the penalty, Totti whispered the famous sentence "Mo je faccio er Cucchiaio" (Roman dialect for "Now I'm scoring with a Panenka") to his teammate and friend Luigi Di Biagio.

Though Italy lost to reigning World Cup Champions France 2–1 in extra time in the final, he started the play which led to Marco Delvecchio's opening goal; Totti sent an unmarked Gianluca Pessotto down the right wing with a back-heel pass, allowing him space to cross the ball into the area, where it was put into the net by Delvecchio. Later, during the second half of the match, Totti provided two scoring opportunities for Alessandro Del Piero, which the Juventus forward was unable to convert. Some UEFA sources credit Totti as the man of the match for the Euro 2000 final, due to his performance, while UEFA's Technical Study Group indicates French forward Thierry Henry as the award winner. Totti was selected for the 22-man Team of the Tournament due to his performances throughout the European Championship.

=== 2002 World Cup ===
After being handed the number 10 shirt and Italy's playmaking duties, much was expected of Totti in his debut World Cup under manager Giovanni Trapattoni. Despite a promising start at the 2002 World Cup held in Japan and Korea, as he set-up Christian Vieri's first goal in Italy's 2–0 opening win over Ecuador, disappointment followed, with Totti failing to score or make a significant impact throughout the tournament. Despite helping to set up Vieri's goal in a disappointing and controversial 2–1 defeat to Croatia in Italy's second group match, his lacklustre performances throughout the tournament were later criticised by the Italian media, in particular his failure to capitalise on several scoring chances in Italy's 1–1 draw against Mexico in their final group match, as Italy only narrowly qualified for the knockout stage.

Despite setting up Vieri's goal in Italy's second round defeat to co-hosts South Korea from a corner, his performance was once again criticised, in particular as he was sent off in extra time after being handed a controversial second yellow card by referee Byron Moreno for simulation.

=== Euro 2004 ===
Although he was once again expected to be Italy's star player in the number 10 role, Totti acquired a measure of infamy at Euro 2004 after he spat at Danish midfielder Christian Poulsen in a goalless draw in Italy's opening group match of the tournament on 14 June 2004. He was subsequently banned until the semi-finals, but never made it back to action and finished the competition scoreless due to Italy's elimination in the first round on direct encounters, following a three-way five point tie with Sweden and Denmark.

=== 2006 World Cup ===
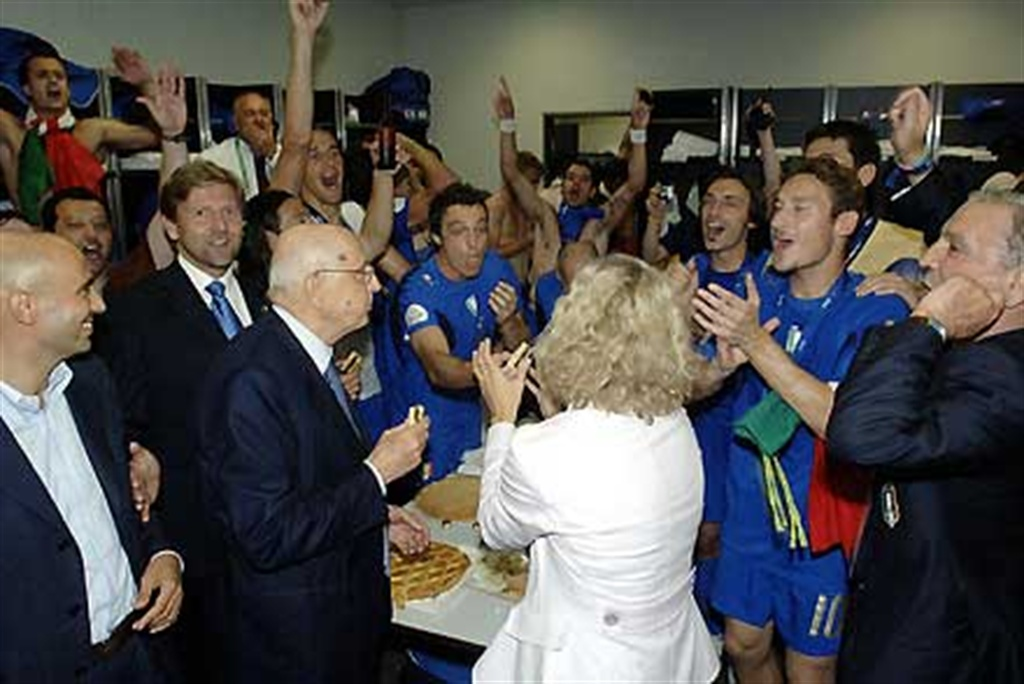
Totti (right), President of Italy Giorgio Napolitano and the team celebrate victory in the 2006 World Cup

Despite injury troubles, Totti recovered in time to join the national team for their victorious 2006 World Cup campaign, despite a lack of match practice during his three months on the sidelines. Italy manager Marcello Lippi showed enormous faith in Totti, assuring him during his rehabilitation that his spot in Italy's World Cup squad was secure and to focus on recuperating. This encouragement and show of faith fueled Totti's desire to work even harder to overcome what could have been a career-ending injury and make it to the World Cup against all odds (and much of the Italian media's opinion).

Totti did recuperate in time and was eventually named to Lippi's final 23-man squad for the 2006 World Cup. Despite initial concerns over his match fitness, Totti was an important player in Marcello Lippi's team, and played in all seven games for Italy, including the victorious final against France, which Italy won on penalties, although he was substituted off in the 61st minute. He played the entire time in Germany with metal plates and screws in his ankle that had yet to be removed following the surgery. Throughout the tournament, he usually played as an attacking midfielder, in front of deep-lying playmaker Andrea Pirlo, and behind strikers Luca Toni, Alberto Gilardino, Vincenzo Iaquinta, or Filippo Inzaghi; these players were supported defensively by Gennaro Gattuso, Simone Perrotta and Daniele De Rossi in midfield. Totti finished the tournament with the joint-highest number of assists, along with Juan Román Riquelme (4). Totti set up Pirlo's goal from a short corner in Italy's opening 2–0 win against Ghana, Marco Materazzi's goal from a corner in Italy's final group match, a 2–0 win against the Czech Republic, and two goals in a 3–0 win against Ukraine in the quarter-finals: the opener by Gianluca Zambrotta, and one of Luca Toni's goals. Totti also scored a goal via an injury-time penalty in Italy's 1–0 round of 16 win over Australia on 26 June. In the semifinal against Germany, following a defensive clearance by Fabio Cannavaro, Totti started the final counterattack by passing the ball to Alberto Gilardino, who provided the assist to Alessandro Del Piero for the last-minute goal which sealed a 2–0 victory. Throughout the competition, Totti completed 185 passes and took 19 shots; in recognition of a successful tournament, he was selected for the 23-man All-Star Team.

=== Retirement ===
Totti intended to retire from international football after the 2006 World Cup, but reneged on his decision and remained undecided on his future for over a year, not being called up in the meantime. He made his retirement official on 20 July 2007, at the beginning of the 2007–08 Serie A season, due to recurring physical problems and in order to focus solely on club play with Roma. Italy's coach at the time, Roberto Donadoni, attempted to get Totti to change his mind for the remaining Euro 2008 qualifiers but was not successful.

After Marcello Lippi's reappointment as the national team's manager following Euro 2008, Totti announced that he would play in the 2010 World Cup finals in South Africa if he were to receive a call-up; however, there was no official statement release from Totti or Lippi about a possible comeback. For the final tournament, Totti was not named in the 23-man squad, and Italy was subsequently eliminated, failing to win a match and finishing last in their group, their worst-ever World Cup performance. Diego Maradona and former national teammates Fabio Cannavaro and Gianluigi Buffon said one of the reasons for Italy's early exit was due to the lack of creative players like Totti in the team.

In March 2013, Lippi's successor as Italy's coach, Cesare Prandelli, stated that he would consider Totti for the 2014 World Cup squad. In October 2013, Prandelli said, "Totti is in fantastic form. His condition right now does make you reflect. If the World Cup was around the corner, I would have no doubts and would absolutely call him up. But we will evaluate the player's condition one month prior to the World Cup." However, at the time of the choice of the final 23-man Italian squad for the World Cup, the Italy coach excluded the Roma striker, preferring to focus the team around younger players. Some in the media criticised the decision, such as former Brazilian international footballer Cafu, who had been Totti's teammate at Roma, who revealed that he would have liked to see Totti competing for Italy at the World Cup in Brazil, and that he preferred the Roma captain over Cristiano Ronaldo and Lionel Messi. Without Totti, Italy was eliminated in the first round for the second consecutive time, finishing third in their group.

In May 2016, several injuries in the Italian squad, as well as a lack of attacking options and Totti's run of good form as a substitute for Roma, led some in the media to call for manager Antonio Conte to include Totti as a reserve in Italy's Euro 2016 squad; however, he was later left out of Conte's 30-man preliminary Italy squad for the final tournament.

== Player profile ==
A great player! What a phenomenon!.

— Lionel Messi

Totti is an artist of football, a true Number 10.

— Michel Platini

Totti is immortal and he is a symbol of our sport. I only regret not having worked with him.

— Carlo Ancelotti

=== Style of play ===
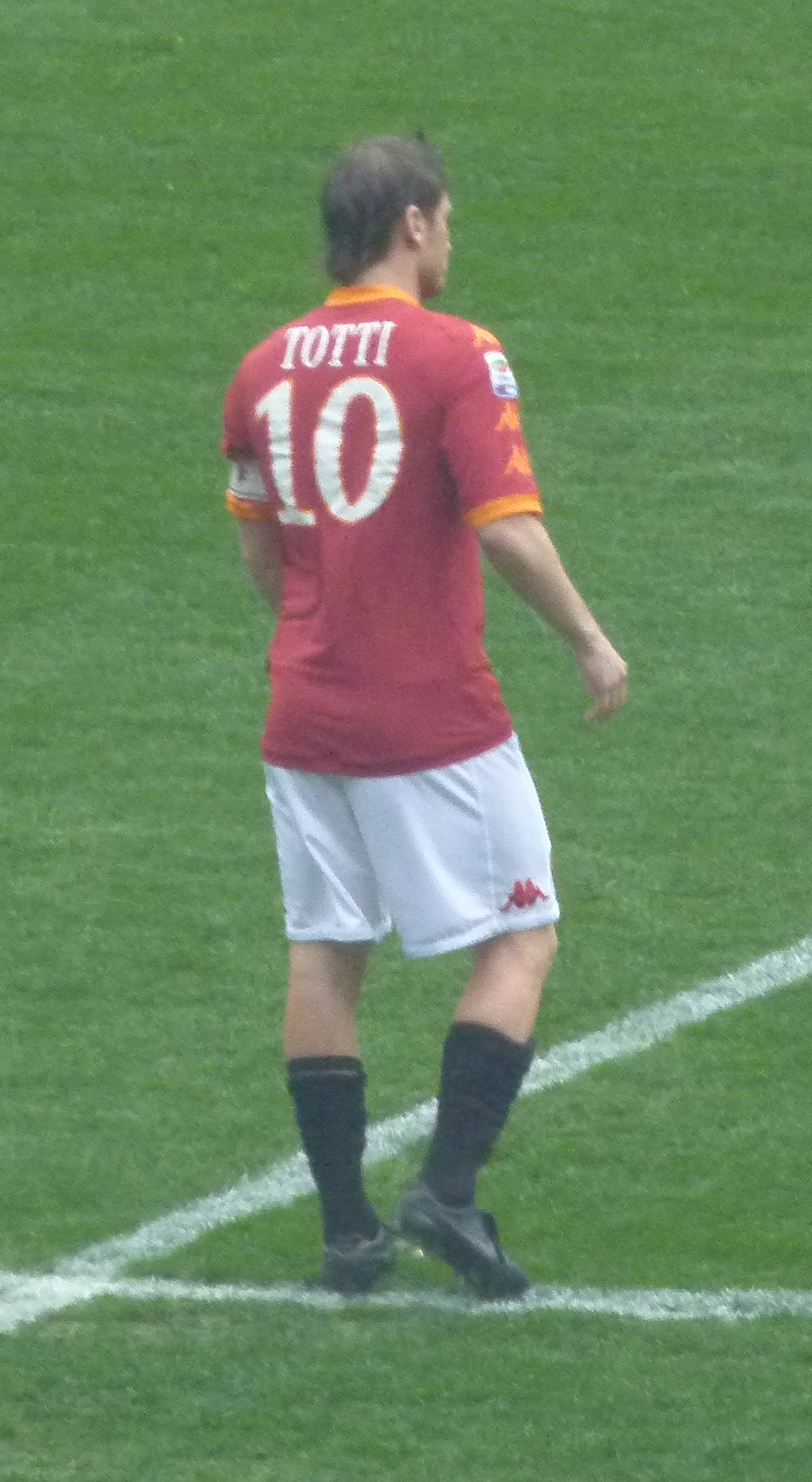
Totti wore number 10 for most of his club career.

Often referred to as Er Bimbo de Oro (The Golden Boy), L'Ottavo Re di Roma (The Eighth King of Rome), Er Pupone (The Big Baby), Il Capitano (The Captain), and Il Gladiatore (The Gladiator) by the Italian sports media, Totti is considered to be one of the greatest Italian players of all time, one of the best players of his generation, and Roma's greatest ever player. Totti is also regarded by some as Italy's greatest player ever. Throughout his career, he played predominantly as a classic number 10, functioning either as an offensive-midfield playmaker or as a supporting or deep-lying forward behind the main striker; only in the later years of his Roma career was he mainly employed as a lone striker. An elegant, world-class, and technically gifted attacking midfielder with a good knowledge of the game, Totti was a tactically versatile player, capable of playing anywhere along the front line, and was also occasionally deployed as a winger or as a central midfielder under Zdeněk Zeman, and most notably as a false 9 under Luciano Spalletti and Rudi Garcia. Under Luis Enrique, he was also occasionally fielded in a more withdrawn creative role in midfield, functioning as a deep-lying playmaker.

While Totti was a prolific goalscorer, he was also renowned for his ball control, vision, creativity, and range of passing, as well as his ability to set the pace in midfield and provide through-balls and assists for his teammates, often through his trademark use of the no-look pass or backheel, in particular when holding up the ball or playing with his back to goal. Throughout his career, Totti drew particular praise from pundits for his excellent vision, technique, and precise long passing ability, which allowed him to play the ball first-time. Due to his movement and range of skills, his role has at times been described as that of a hardworking, unselfish and dynamic centre-forward, known as a centravanti di manovra in Italian (which literally translates to "manoeuvring centre-forward"). Known for his work rate, longevity, and willingness to contribute defensively, Totti underwent an athletic development during his time under Zeman: he undertook a muscle-strengthening programme to adapt to the rhythms of 21st-century football, gaining physical strength, stamina, fitness and shooting power to the detriment of some of his speed and agility, which also enabled him to maintain a consistent level of performance in his later career.

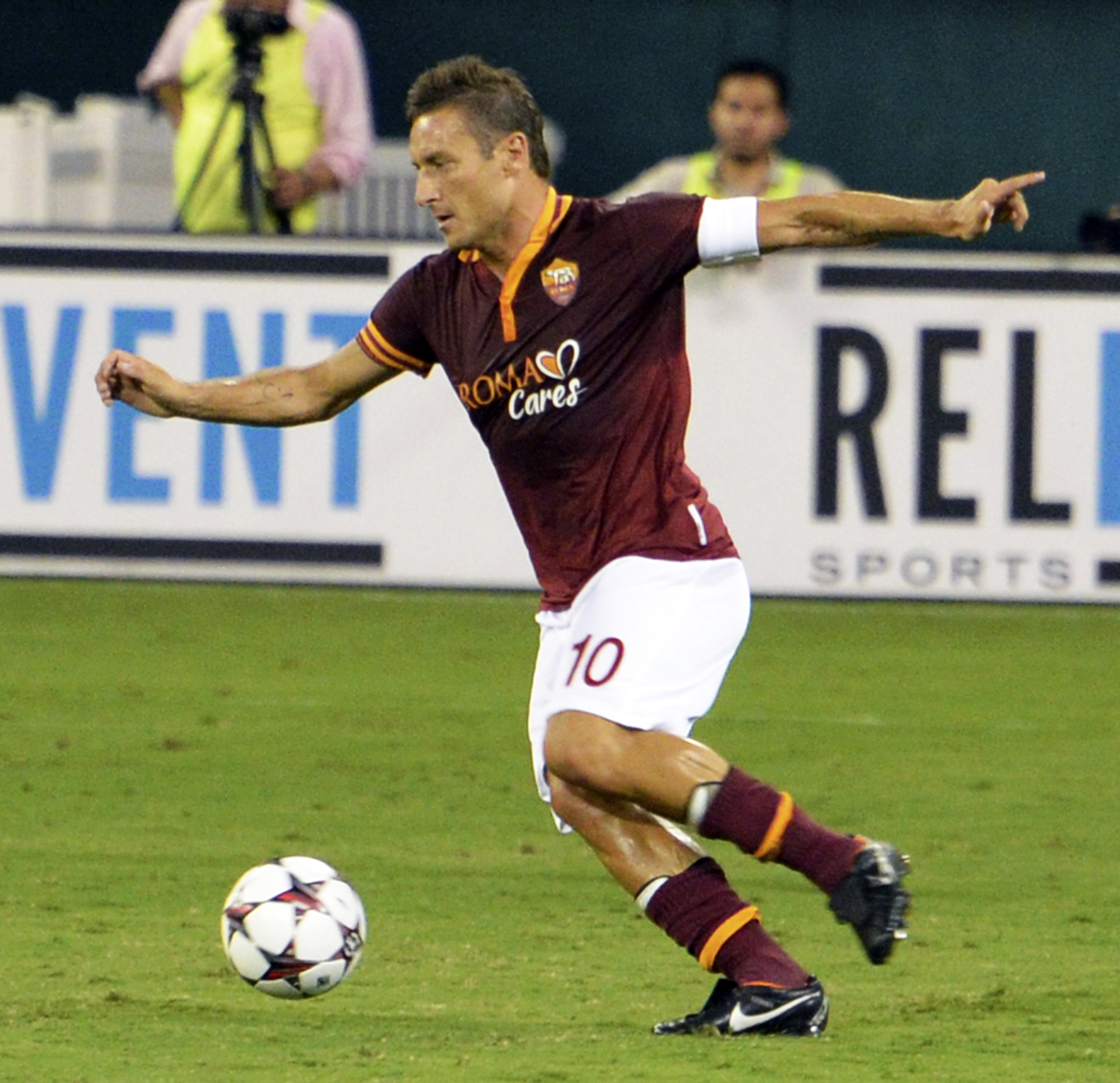
Totti during a pre-season friendly in 2013

Throughout his career, Totti utilised his balance, dribbling skills, and acceleration in order to get past opponents; despite being naturally right-footed, he possessed a powerful and accurate shot from both inside and outside the area with either foot, and was also an accurate penalty kick and free kick taker, who was capable of striking the ball either with power or swerve from set pieces. Totti also scored several goals from chipped shots throughout his career, and often used the technique on penalties, which was also known as the cucchiaio technique (or "spoon" in Italian); one of the most famous instances in which Totti performed this type of penalty was in the victorious shootout of Italy's Euro 2000 semi-final match against the Netherlands. One of his most famous lobbed goals, in which he dribbled past Inter's Marco Materazzi before chipping the ball over goalkeeper Júlio César, was later named the best goal in Serie A of the 2005–06 season. He scored another notable goal using this technique against Lazio in the 2002 Derby della Capitale, which ended in a 5–1 win for Roma. The title of Totti's 2006 autobiography Tutto Totti: Mo je faccio er cucchiaio (English: All about Totti: I'm gonna chip him now) referenced this technique, as well as the statement made to his Italy teammates before his memorable Euro 2000 semi-final shootout penalty against the Netherlands. Having served as Roma's captain for several years, Totti was praised for his leadership. Italian former footballer Roberto Mancini likened Totti's playing style to his own in 2016, due to his movement, quality, and intuition.

Despite his talent and ability, however, Totti drew criticism at times for his character and lack of discipline on the pitch, which occasionally caused him to commit bad fouls and receive unnecessary bookings; with eleven red cards and 109 yellow cards, he has the joint-sixth highest number of sending offs in Serie A history, and the seventh most bookings in the league's history.

=== Goal celebrations ===
Totti was known for his exuberant and humorous goal celebrations. One of his famous celebrations took place on 11 April 1999 in the second Derby della Capitale of the 1998–99 season, in which he scored during the final minutes of the game and celebrated by flashing a T-shirt under his jersey, which read "Vi ho purgato ancora" ("I've purged you guys again"), in reference to events at the previous derby against Lazio on 29 November 1998 when Totti helped Roma come back from 3–1 down with an assist to Eusebio Di Francesco for 3–2 and finally a goal of his own for 3–3. Another derby goal against Lazio saw him take over a sideline camera and aim it at the Roma fans.

Totti has displayed numerous T-shirts with messages on them from under his jersey over the years, including two for his wife; "6 Unica" ("You're One of a kind") and "6 Sempre Unica" ("You're Still the One"), and a political one "Liberate Giuliana" ("Free Giuliana") in honor of Giuliana Sgrena, an Italian journalist kidnapped in 2005 by insurgents in Iraq who was later freed. The most recent message was "Scusate il Ritardo" ("Sorry for the delay") which he flashed on 8 January 2012 as an apology to fans for his goalscoring drought after scoring his first goal of the season versus Chievo.

As a tribute to his then-pregnant wife, Ilary Blasi, Totti imitated a childbirth scene by stuffing the ball under his shirt and lying on his back while his teammates extracted the ball. His current ritual of sucking his thumb after a goal began after his son was born and continued after the birth of his daughter. Blasi has revealed that Totti also sucks his thumb in dedication to her and not just for their children. On 11 January 2015, Totti scored twice against Lazio in the Derby della Capitale as Roma came back from 2–0 down; he then took a selfie with Roma fans.

== After retirement ==
On 17 July 2017, Totti confirmed his retirement from professional football and announced that he had accepted an offer from his former team to become a club director. On 18 September, Totti began studying for a course in order to obtain his UEFA B coaching licence. However, he withdrew from the course two weeks later, as he was unable to attend the course regularly due to his commitments as a director of Roma; his former teammate Simone Perrotta took his place.

On 17 June 2019, he announced his resignation from his role at Roma, in an hour-long press conference held at the Italian Olympic Committee headquarters, where he publicly accused chairman James Pallotta and the management for not involving him enough in the club's decision making, stating he would reconsider a comeback only under a different ownership. This marked the end of his 30-year association with the club.

== Outside of professional football ==
=== Personal life ===
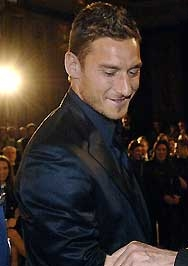
Totti in 2007

Totti married Ilary Blasi, a former showgirl and a co-host of Italia 1's Le Iene, on 19 June 2005 at the Basilica of Santa Maria in Aracoeli. Their wedding was aired on television, with the proceeds being donated to charity. They had their first child on 6 November 2005. Their second child, a daughter, was born on 13 May 2007. The couple had often been referred to as the "Italian Beckhams", and their private lives are often speculated upon in Italian magazines and tabloids. On 10 March 2016, the couple had their third child.

On 12 October 2020, Totti's father, Enzo, died at 76 years old due to COVID-19, amid the pandemic in Italy. In the aftermath, Totti struggled with his mental health and discovered evidence of Blasi's infidelity. On 11 July 2022, it was announced that Totti and Blasi had separated. Totti then started a relationship with Noemi Bocchi. In October 2024, Totti ended his relationship with Bocchi, and began a new relationship with sports journalist Marialuisa Jacobelli. Totti is a Roman Catholic.

Totti's brother Riccardo serves as his agent, and manages many of his brand and business interests, under the name Number Ten, including the Francesco Totti Academy, a football training school, and the Totti Soccer School, a football camp for children with disabilities. Totti also owns a motorcycle racing team called Totti Top Sport.

=== Philanthropy ===
Totti became a goodwill ambassador for UNICEF in 2003, and an ambassador for the FIFA/SOS Children's Villages in January 2006. As a fundraiser for a children's charity, he published two best-selling, self-effacing joke books, containing jokes the locals often told about him and his teammates. Some of the jokes were filmed in short sketches, featuring himself with good friends and national teammates Alessandro Del Piero, Gianluigi Buffon, Christian Vieri, Antonio Cassano, Marco Delvecchio, Alessandro Nesta and former national team coach Giovanni Trapattoni in a short show called La sai l'ultima di Totti. On 16 January 2008, he appeared as "PaperTotti" in the Disney comic series Topolino. The proceeds of the subscriptions were given to charity. The Roma captain's official testimonial was a fundraising match between singers and celebrities played on 12 May 2008 to help raise money for the construction of the Campus Produttivo della Legalità e della Solidarietà (Productive Campus of Legality and Solidarity).

In 2009, Totti helped launch a new campaign promoting Football Adopting Abandoned Children, which came about in collaboration with the Friends of Children and the Association of Italian Players. In the project, he adopted a team of around eleven young Kenyans to play football in Nairobi, and then to coach them along the way. In 2015, Totti and several of his teammates took to the pitch for "Tennis with Stars" in the Foro Italico in Rome, an event to help disadvantaged children. Tennis players such as Novak Djokovic and Flavia Pennetta participated at the event. On 27 September 2016, Totti celebrated his 40th birthday live on his new Facebook page, at the Tor Crescenza castle in Rome.

Totti recorded a video message for a comatose hospital patient who awoke from her coma when his voice was played; Totti visited the patient in the hospital in September 2020.

=== Television, cinema and publicity ===
In 2002, Fiat principal executive Gianni Agnelli, a lifelong fan and ex-president of Juventus, chose Totti to publicize the launch of the new Stilo instead of a Juventus player. Having been signed to sportswear company Nike, Totti featured in Nike's "Secret Tournament" advertisement, directed by Terry Gilliam, in the buildup to the 2002 World Cup in Korea and Japan. He appeared alongside Ronaldo, Ronaldinho, Luís Figo, Roberto Carlos and Hidetoshi Nakata, with former player Eric Cantona the tournament "referee".

Totti has featured in EA Sports' FIFA video game series; he appeared on the cover of the Italian edition of FIFA 2002. He also featured on the cover of Pro Evolution Soccer 4, along with Thierry Henry and Italian referee Pierluigi Collina. Between 2005 and 2008, his sponsors changed to sportswear company Diadora and soft drink Pepsi Twist, with a commercial filmed in the camps of Trigoria by director Gabriele Muccino. Since May 2006, he has appeared in advertisements for telephone company Vodafone. In December 2006, Totti and his wife Ilary Blasi lent their voices to an Italian dubbing of an episode of the television series The Simpsons entitled "Marge and Homer Turn a Couple Play", in which Totti voiced Buck Mitchell. In 2007, he appeared in the movie L'allenatore nel Pallone 2, in the role of a defense attorney. Since 2008, he has participated several times in the television program C'è posta per te, in the second series of the Italian drama Cesaroni, in the reality show Grande Fratello 8 and in an episode of Paperissima. In September 2008, a collection of figurines dedicated to him appeared in newsstands in the Lazio region entitled "Francesco Totti, the captain". In 2009, Totti sent a message of support to Iranian youths during the 2009 Iranian presidential election protests. In February 2010, Totti was named an ambassador for online poker company Party Poker.

In May 2010, Totti appeared alongside actor Russell Crowe in Rome to promote the special edition of the film Gladiator, celebrating the tenth anniversary of the film's release. In December 2014, two murals of Totti, sponsored by Nike, were created in Rome. In 2014, the Swiss artist David Diehl painted Totti as one of 16 football icons most beloved by their fans. In 2015, France Football rated him one of the ten best footballers in the world over the age of 36. In 2015, Totti's famous selfie goal celebration was included amongst the goal celebrations available for FIFA 16 and Pro Evolution Soccer 2016. On 1 August 2017, a rocket carrying Totti's number 10 shirt from his final game with Roma against Genoa was launched into space from French Guiana.

In 2020 he was the subject of My Name Is Francesco Totti (Mi chiamo Francesco Totti), a documentary film by Alex Infascelli.

In March 2024, Betsson launched its Betsson.Sport infotainment platform in Italy with Totti as ambassador. Totti, along with Bebe Vio, were ambassadors for the 2026 Winter Olympics hosted in Milan and Cortina d'Ampezzo.

== Career statistics ==
=== Club ===
Appearances and goals by club, season and competition
Club	Season	League			Coppa Italia		Europe		Supercoppa		Total	
Club	Season	Division	Apps	Goals	Apps	Goals	Apps	Goals	Apps	Goals	Apps	Goals
Roma	1992–93	Serie A	2	0	0	0	—		—		2	0
Roma	1993–94	Serie A	8	0	2	0	—		—		10	0
Roma	1994–95	Serie A	21	4	4	3	—		—		25	7
Roma	1995–96	Serie A	28	2	1	0	7 (Note: Appearances in UEFA Cup)	2	—		36	4
Roma	1996–97	Serie A	26	5	1	0	3	0	—		30	5
Roma	1997–98	Serie A	30	13	6	1	—		—		36	14
Roma	1998–99	Serie A	31	12	3	1	8	3	—		42	16
Roma	1999–2000	Serie A	27	7	2	0	5	1	—		34	8
Roma	2000–01	Serie A	30	13	2	1	3	2	—		35	16
Roma	2001–02	Serie A	24	8	0	0	11 (Note: Appearances in UEFA Champions League)	3	1	1	36	12
Roma	2002–03	Serie A	24	14	5	3	6	3	—		35	20
Roma	2003–04	Serie A	31	20	0	0	1	0	—		32	20
Roma	2004–05	Serie A	29	12	7	3	4	0	—		40	15
Roma	2005–06	Serie A	24	15	2	0	3	2	—		29	17
Roma	2006–07	Serie A	35	26	5	2	9	4	1	0	50	32
Roma	2007–08	Serie A	25	14	3	3	6	1	1	0	35	18
Roma	2008–09	Serie A	24	13	0	0	7	2	1	0	32	15
Roma	2009–10	Serie A	23	14	2	0	6 (Note: Appearances in UEFA Europa League)	11	—		31	25
Roma	2010–11	Serie A	32	15	0	0	7	2	1	0	40	17
Roma	2011–12	Serie A	27	8	2	0	2	0	—		31	8
Roma	2012–13	Serie A	34	12	3	0	—		—		37	12
Roma	2013–14	Serie A	26	8	3	0	—		—		29	8
Roma	2014–15	Serie A	27	8	2	0	7 (Note: Five appearances and two goals in UEFA Champions League, two appearances in UEFA Europa League)	2	—		36	10
Roma	2015–16	Serie A	13	5	0	0	2	0	—		15	5
Roma	2016–17	Serie A	18	2	4	1	6	0	—		28	3
Career total			619	250	59	18	103	38	5	1	786	307

=== International ===
Appearances and goals by national team and year
National team	Year	Apps	Goals
Italy	1998	3	0
Italy	1999	6	0
Italy	2000	12	4
Italy	2001	6	1
Italy	2002	6	0
Italy	2003	5	1
Italy	2004	6	2
Italy	2005	5	0
Italy	2006	9	1
Total		58	9

Scores and results list Italy's goal tally first, score column indicates score after each Totti goal.

List of international goals scored by Francesco Totti
No.	Date	Venue	Opponent	Score	Result	Competition
1	26 April 2000	Stadio Oreste Granillo, Reggio Calabria, Italy	Portugal	2–0	2–0	Friendly
2	14 June 2000	Koning Boudewijnstadion, Brussels, Belgium	Belgium	1–0	2–0	UEFA Euro 2000
3	24 June 2000	Koning Boudewijnstadion, Brussels, Belgium	Romania	1–0	2–0	UEFA Euro 2000
4	7 October 2000	Stadio Giuseppe Meazza, Milan, Italy	Romania	3–0	3–0	2002 FIFA World Cup Qualification
5	2 June 2001	Boris Paichadze Stadium, Tbilisi, Georgia	Georgia	2–0	2–1	2002 FIFA World Cup Qualification
6	11 June 2003	Helsingin olympiastadion, Helsinki, Finland	Finland	1–0	2–0	UEFA Euro 2004 qualification
7	13 October 2004	Stadio Ennio Tardini, Parma, Italy	Belarus	1–0	4–3	2006 FIFA World Cup Qualification
8	13 October 2004	Stadio Ennio Tardini, Parma, Italy	Belarus	3–1	4–3	2006 FIFA World Cup Qualification
9	26 June 2006	Fritz Walter Stadion, Kaiserslautern, Germany	Australia	1–0	1–0	2006 FIFA World Cup

== Honours ==
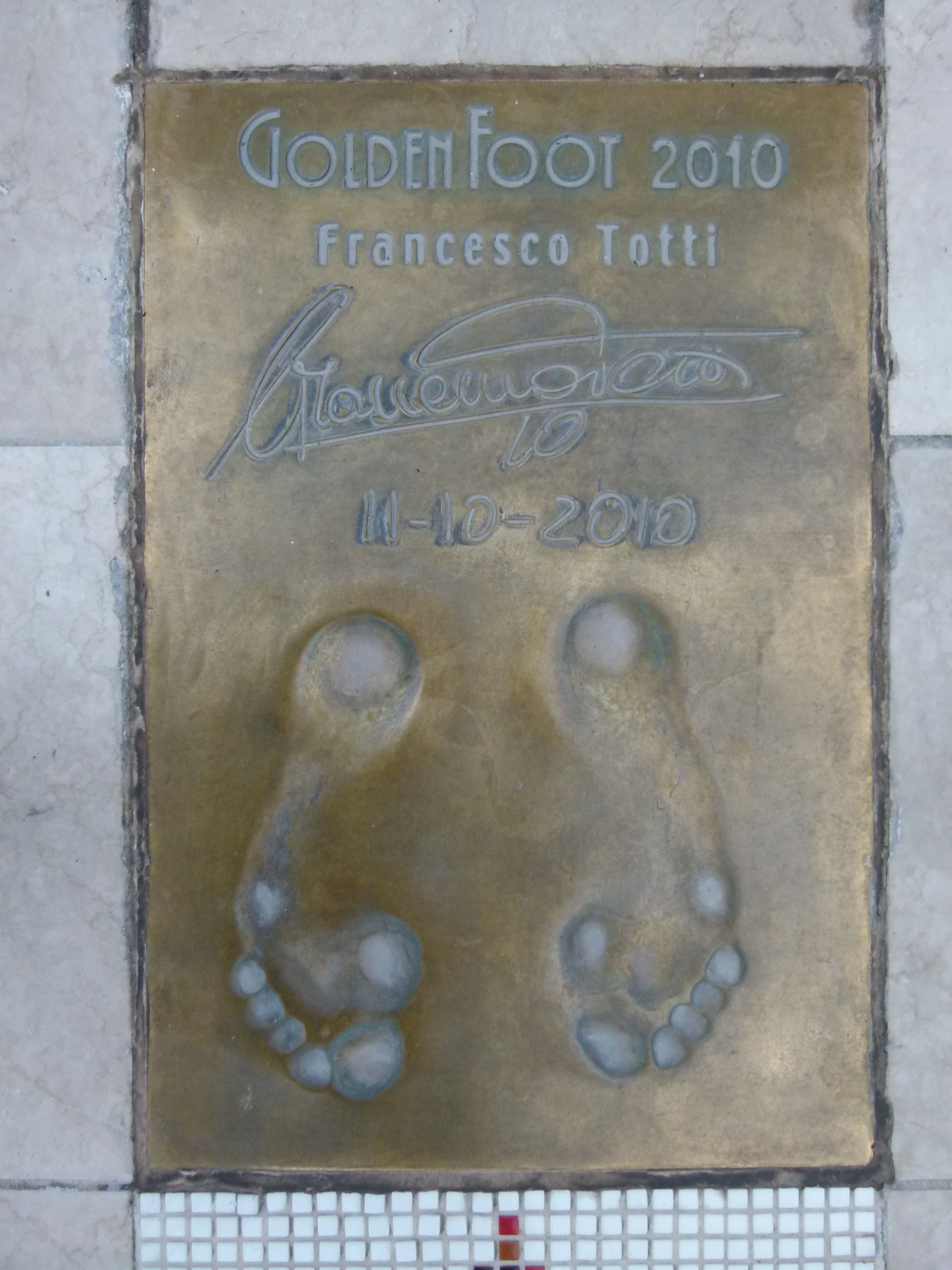
Totti's footprint on The Champions Promenade in Monaco

Roma

- Serie A: 2000–01
- Coppa Italia: 2006–07, 2007–08
- Supercoppa Italiana: 2001, 2007

Italy U21

- UEFA European Under-21 Championship: 1996

Italy U23

- Mediterranean Games: 1997

Italy

- FIFA World Cup: 2006
- UEFA European Championship runner-up: 2000

Individual

- Guerin d'Oro: 1998, 2004
- Serie A Young Footballer of the Year: 1999
- UEFA European Championship Team of the Tournament: 2000
- Serie A Footballer of the Year: 2000, 2003
- Serie A Italian Footballer of the Year: 2000, 2001, 2003, 2004, 2007
- ESM Team of the Year: 2000–01, 2003–04, 2006–07
- FIFA 100
- Serie A Goal of the Year: 2005, 2006
- FIFA World Cup All-Star Team: 2006
- FIFA World Cup top assists provider: 2006
- Serie A top assists provider: 1998–99, 2013–14
- Capocannoniere: 2006–07
- European Golden Shoe: 2006–07
- Serie A Goalscorer of the Year: 2007
- Pallone d'Argento: 2007–08
- Golden Foot: 2010
- Premio Nazionale Carriera Esemplare "Gaetano Scirea": 2014
- Premio internazionale Giacinto Facchetti: 2014
- UEFA European Under-21 Championship All-time XI: 2015
- AS Roma Hall of Fame: 2017
- UEFA President's Award: 2017
- Gazzetta Sports Awards Legend: 2017
- Globe Soccer Player Career Award: 2017
- Laureus Academy World Sports Exceptional Achievement Award: 2018
- AIC Lifetime Achievement Award: 2018
- Italian Football Hall of Fame: 2018
- IFFHS Legends

Records

- Roma all-time leading goalscorer: 307 goals
- Roma all-time leading goalscorer in Serie A: 250 goals
- Roma all-time leading goalscorer in UEFA Champions League: 17 goals
- Roma all-time leading goalscorer in UEFA Europa League: 21 goals
- Roma all-time leading goalscorer in UEFA competitions: 38 goals
- Roma all-time appearance maker: 786 matches
- Roma all-time appearance maker in Serie A: 619 matches
- Roma all-time appearance maker in UEFA Champions League: 57 matches
- Roma all-time appearance maker in UEFA Europa League: 46 matches
- Roma all-time appearance maker in UEFA competitions: 103 matches
- Most assists for Italy national team: 25
- Serie A youngest club's captain: aged 22 years 34 days
- Most goals for a single club in Serie A: 250 goals
- Second-most goals scored in Serie A: 250 goals
- All-time most assists in Serie A: 162
- Derby della Capitale all-time leading goalscorer in Serie A: 11 goals
- Most penalties scored in Serie A: 71 goals
- Most different teams scored against in Serie A (alongside Roberto Baggio and Alberto Gilardino): 38

Orders

- Commander of the Order of Merit of the Italian Republic (2 June 2022 ; Officer in 2006 ; Knight in 2000)
- Golden Collar of Sports Merit (Italy, 2006)

== Bibliography ==
- Tutte le barzellette su Totti. (Raccolte da me), Milan, Mondadori, 2003. ISBN 88-04-52337-9 (All the jokes about Totti. Collected by me) (in Italian)
- Le nuove barzellette su Totti. (Raccolte ancora da me), Milan, Mondadori, 2004. ISBN 88-04-52482-0 (The new jokes about Totti. Collected by me again) (in Italian)
- «Mo je faccio er cucchiaio». Il mio calcio, Milan, Mondadori, 2006. ISBN 88-04-55733-8 (I'm gonna chip him now. My football) (in Italian)
- Tutto Totti, Milan, Mondadori, 2006. ISBN 978-88-04-56753-0 (All about Totti) (in Italian)
- La mia vita, i miei gol (book + DVD), Milan, Mondadori, 2007. ISBN 88-04-57241-8 (My life, my goals) (in Italian)
- Quando i bambini fanno "ahó" (book + DVD), Milan, Mondadori, 2009. ISBN 88-04-59004-1 (When the children shout "Ahó") (in Italian)
- E mo' te spiego Roma. La mia guida all'antica Roma, Milan, Mondadori, 2012. ISBN 88-04-62401-9 (And Now I Explain Rome to You. My Guide to Ancient Rome) (in Italian)
- "Totteide", Franco Constantini Imprimatur 2013. ISBN 978-88-68-3003-40
- Roma 10. In giro per Roma col Capitano, Milan, Mondadori, 2014. ISBN 978-88-04-64042-4 (Roma 10. Around Rome with the Captain) (in Italian)
- Francesco Totti, Alessandro Al costo, Oltre. Uno si ritira e gli succede di tutto. Che poi tocca pure raccontarlo, Cairo editore, 2026. ISBN 978-88-309-0647-1.

== See also ==
- List of one-club men in football
- Football records in Italy

== Bibliography ==
- Fernando Acitelli, Francesco Totti. Il tribuno di Porta Latina, Arezzo, Limina, 2002. ISBN 88-86713-79-7 (Francesco Totti. The tribune of Porta Latina) (in Italian)
- Mario Sconcerti, La differenza di Totti, Arezzo, Limina, 2004. ISBN 88-88551-45-X (The difference of Totti) (in Italian)
- Francesco Bovaio, con Cristiano Ditta, Francesco Totti. Semplicemente numero dieci, Milan, Giunti Editore, 2006. ISBN 88-09-04780-X (Francesco Totti. Simply number ten) (in Italian)
- Massimo Cecchini, Francesco Totti. Vita, parole e impresse dell'ultimo gladiatore, Roma, Aliberti, 2009. ISBN 88-7424-493-2 (Totti. Life, words and feats of the last gladiator) (in Italian)
- Tonino Cagnucci, Francesco Totti. dai politici al cuore, Roma, Limina, 2010. ISBN 88-6041-056-8 (Francesco Totti. From politicians to heart) (in Italian)
- Gianluca Tino, L'invasione degli UltraTotti, Roma, Eraclea, 2010. ISBN 88-88771-22-0 (The invasion of UltraTotti) (in Italian)
- Francesca Spaziani Testa, Francesco Totti minuto per minuto, Firenze-San Casciano V.P, Castelvecchi, 2012. ISBN 88-7615-685-2 (Francesco Totti minute by minute) (in Italian)
- Francesco Costantini, Totteide. (Poema epico), Roma, Imprimatur, 2013. ISBN 88-6830-034-6 (Totteide. Epic poem) (in Italian)
