= Super Formation Soccer 94 =

1994 association football video game

Super Formation Soccer 94: World Cup Edition
- Box art image of Super Formation Soccer 94: World Cup Edition
- Developer(s): Human Entertainment
- Publisher(s): Human Entertainment
- Composer(s): Masamichi Yamazaki; Hironori Tanaka; Yukie Sugawara; Yayoi Okumura; Takamitsu Kajikawa
- Series: Super Formation Soccer
- Platform(s): Super Famicom
- Release: JP: June 17, 1994
- Genre(s): Traditional soccer simulation
- Mode(s): Single-player, multiplayer

Super Formation Soccer 94: World Cup Edition (スーパーフォーメーションサッカー94 ワールドカップ・エディション, World Cup Edition 94 Supafomeshonsakka) is the third release of the original Super Formation Soccer video game, which was made specially for the 1994 FIFA World Cup.

== Summary ==
Japan vs Iraq (attempt at simulating the Agony of Doha).

There are various playable modes like Exhibition, World Cup, League (sponsored by Adidas) and Tournament (sponsored by Snickers). There were many improvements over the previous two versions, one of the most important being the availability of choosing more teams. All the 24 national teams that partook that year's World Cup are represented (except the inclusion of Japan (that didn't qualify) instead of South Korea), however the latter one was included in the special/hidden teams. Using two special codes, the player will have access to the special/hidden teams which didn't take part in the 1994 World Cup: England, Wales, Uruguay, Denmark, France and South Korea (this one was the one who qualified to the World Cup). The other two hidden teams are "Masters" and "Human". In the World Cup mode there is a sub-mode where the players can face the Asian qualification using only the Japan national team.

== Special version ==
On September 22 of the same year, a new version of the game was released: Super Formation Soccer 94: World Cup Final Data (スーパーフォーメーションサッカー94 ワールドカップファイナルデータ, Supafomeshonsakka 94 World Cup Final Data).

== Sequels ==
- Super Formation Soccer 95: della Serie A
- Super Formation Soccer 96: World Club Edition
