= Super Soccer =

1991 video game

Super Soccer Super Formation Soccer
- North American box art
- Developer: Human Entertainment
- Publishers: JP: Human Entertainment; WW: Nintendo
- Programmer: Ryoji Amano
- Artists: Akihiro Hata; Yuka Miyamoto
- Composers: Hiroya Niwayama; Hironori Tanaka; Masamichi Yamazaki; Tetsuji Ohtani
- Platform: Super NES
- Release: JP: December 13, 1991; NA: May 1992; EU: April 11, 1992
- Genres: Sports, football (soccer)
- Modes: Single-player, multiplayer

Super Soccer, known in Japanese as Super Formation Soccer (スーパーフォーメーションサッカー), is a football (soccer) video game developed by Human Entertainment for the Super Nintendo Entertainment System (SNES) and published by Human Entertainment in Japan and Nintendo internationally. It was released in Japan in 1991 and in North America and Europe in 1992, being a launch title in Europe. It was included on the Nintendo Classic Mini: Super Famicom released in Japan in October 2017 and was initially re-released worldwide on the Nintendo Classics service in September 2019, but was removed worldwide on March 28, 2025.

== Gameplay ==
The referee showing a red card (Japanese version).

The game consists of exhibition games and tournament games. In exhibition, one can choose to play either a match or a shootout (which is not available in the Japanese version). In tournament mode, one plays until one beats all other teams. After beating all the national teams, the player must play one final team, Nintendo (Human in the Japanese version). When the tournament has been won, the player receives a code to play the game in a more advanced mode.

=== Shooting ===
The Gameplay provides a wide range of shooting options. It is possible to do a low shot by pressing the passing button. The shoot can be straight or bent in either way to make the shoot wider or closer. The same thing is possible by shooting higher. A shot that would normally be too wide, central or narrow can be bent.

=== Passing ===
These are the options:

- Passing the ball to a selected team member. The ball will move automatically to him.
- Straight, sharp, low passes. They can be bent to make them more precise if needed.
- Passing via pressing the shooting bottom. This is useful for wide vertical or horizontal passes or closer passes to a team member with good ball control. By means of bending, high accuracy can be achieved which can accelerate the attack and create space.

=== Crossing ===
Crosses can be made while the player stands horizontally or diagonally towards the goal line.

- Standing horizontally, the ball can be bent inwardly to make a dangerous cross.
- Standing diagonally, the cross can be bent both ways: inwardly (the ball bends towards the goal line, which makes the cross shorter) or outwardly (making the cross longer). Outward Crosses are an effective way to score goals by a header.

== Series ==
Originally, Formation Soccer was a PC Engine-native game that was released before the 1990 FIFA World Cup. The series was then carried over to Super Nintendo, with the addition of the prefix "Super". Meanwhile, two sequels of Formation Soccer for the PC Engine were spawned. In 1995, Hyper Formation Soccer was released for the PlayStation; two more Formation Soccer games were later released for that console. In 2002, Formation Soccer 2002 was released by Spike, for the Game Boy Advance.

Super Formation Soccer spawned four sequels, all of them developed and published by Human in Japan only.

- Super Formation Soccer II (1993)
  - Kept largely the same structure of the original game, only with some teams changed: Ireland, Yugoslavia and Uruguay are replaced with Spain, Denmark and Sweden.
- Super Formation Soccer 94 (1994)
  - Was made specially for the then-upcoming 1994 FIFA World Cup, including the 24 teams that partook it, plus Japan.
- Super Formation Soccer 95: della Serie A (1995)
  - Instead of national teams, this game featured all clubs from the Italian Serie A (SEASON 1994-95 Serie A).
- Super Formation Soccer 96: World Club Edition (1996)
  - It was the last game to date in the series. It featured 18 fictitious club teams (13 European, four Latin American and one Japanese) from around the world, based on well-known teams by the time.

== Reception ==
Reception

Review scores
Publication	Score
Computer and Video Games	87/100
Famitsu	8/10, 9/10, 6/10, 8/10
Games-X	4.5/5
Super Play	83%
Total!	80%
Control	61%
Game Zone	91/100
Hippon Super!	7/10
Mean Machines	73%
N-Force	81%
SNES Force	84%
Super Action	80%
The Super Famicom	A
Super Gamer	63%
Super Pro	80/100

According to Famitsu, Super Soccer sold 56,367 copies in its first week on the market and 600,000 copies during its lifetime in Japan. The Japanese publication Micom BASIC Magazine ranked the game fifth in popularity in its March 1992 issue.

Super Soccer received generally favorable reviews from critics. Julian Rignall and Edward Lawrence of Mean Machines praised the game's unusual viewpoint and graphics, describing its presentation as visually appealing. However, they criticised the gameplay, particularly the lack of a radar, which made passing more difficult because many forward players were not visible when playing downfield. They also criticised the game's lack of realism, noting that the ball appeared to remain airborne for much of a match. They concluded that Super Soccer was a potentially excellent game that was held back by minor design flaws and insufficient playtesting. Super Gamer wrote: "Once one of the best footie sims, competition from more recent releases has made this seem painfully slow and unsophisticated".

== See also ==
- Super Goal! 2
