= Rodolfo Volk =

Italian footballer (1906–1983)

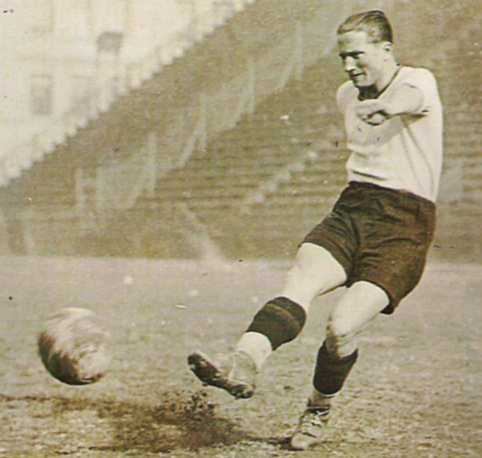

Personal information
- Date of birth: 14 January 1906
- Place of birth: Fiume, Austria-Hungary
- Date of death: 2 October 1983 (aged 77)
- Place of death: Nemi, Italy
- Position: Forward

Senior career*
Years	Team	Apps	(Gls)
1925–1926	Gloria Fiume	15	(10)
1926–1927	Fiorentina	14	(11)
1927–1928	Fiumana	16	(16)
1928–1933	Roma	157	(103)
1933–1934	Pisa	30	(16)
1934–1935	Triestina	6	(1)
1935–1942	Fiumana	145	(74)
1945–1946	R.O.M.S.A. Fiume	2	(0)
1946–1948	Proleter Fiume		
1948–1949	Montevarchi	14	(5)

International career
1929–1930	Italy B	5	(5)
- * Club domestic league appearances and goals

Rodolfo Volk (Sometimes italianized in Rodolfo Folchi) (14 January 1906 – 2 October 1983) was an Italian footballer who played as a forward.

Volk is regarded as one of the most prolific goalscorers in the history of Roma and is remembered as the club's first goalscorer in an official match. As of May 2020 he is the fourth best goalscorer in Roma's history, having scored 103 goals in 157 league appearances. In 2018, he was inducted into the club's Hall of Fame.

== Career ==
Volk was born in Fiume in 1906 and began to play football for U.S. Fiumana, the team of his city; he was known to be a powerful striker.

He played a non-official match with Fiorentina under the fake surname of Bolteni, this was because he was serving in the military, and was not permitted to do any other activity.

In 1928 he was signed up by the newly formed Italian club A.S. Roma and became one of its most important players during the 1920s and the 1930s. He was the first official goalscorer in Campo Testaccio, the club's first-ever stadium.

Playing a total of 150 games with the Giallorossi, he scored 103 goals for the club, and scored the first goal in the first ever Derby della Capitale, a 1–0 victory against cross-city rivals S.S. Lazio in 1929.

During the 1930–31 season, he was the Serie A top scorer with 29 goals in 33 games, helping Roma to finish as runners-up in the league.

He left Roma in 1933, due to personal problems with Enrique Guaita and Elvio Banchero, and was signed up by Pisa.

== Personal life ==
Rodolfo Volk was born in 1906 in the Adriatic port city of Fiume, Austria-Hungary (today Rijeka, Croatia), to an ethnic Slovene family. The meaning of his family name Volk in Slovene is wolf, a symbol of the club Roma where he spent his most prolific playing days and is considered a club legend. During the interwar period and the fascist state policy of forced Italianization he was known under the Italianized name of Rodolfo Foschi (or Folchi). In 1934 his first wife Giovanna died prematurely. After World War II he and his second wife Maria, together with his two sons, were forced to leave Rijeka and were eventually settled in a refugee camp in Laterina. Later in life he moved to Rome and made a living with the help of a number of low-paying jobs. Volk died, on the night between 2 and 3 October 1983, impoverished and forgotten in a nursery home in a small town of Nemi.

== Honours ==
Fiumana

- Serie C: 1940–41

Individual

- Serie A top scorer: 1930–31 (29 goals)
- A.S. Roma Hall of Fame: 2018
