= List of AS Roma records and statistics =

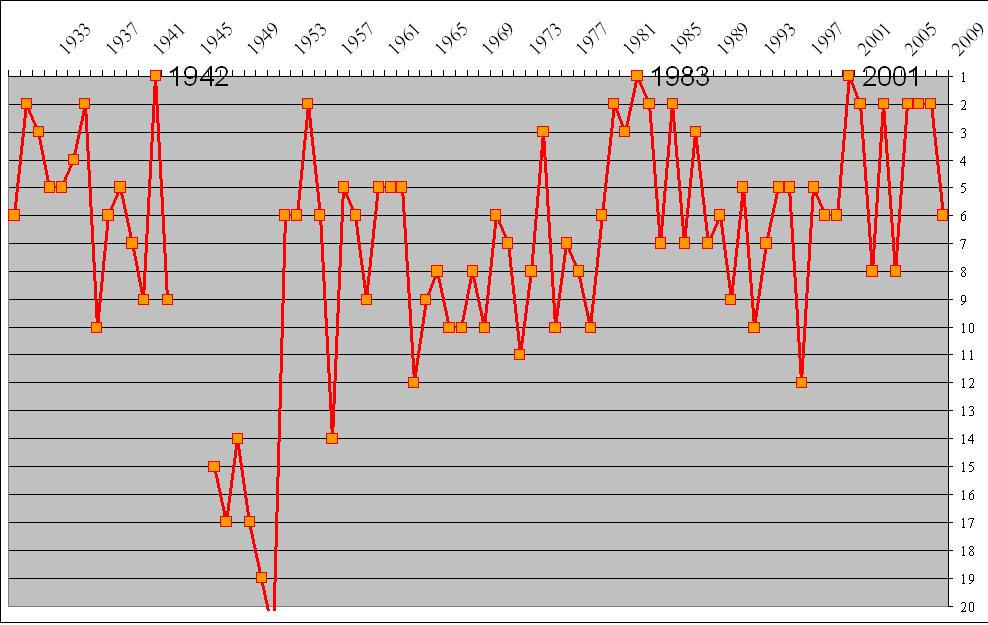
Historical AS Roma positions in Serie A

Records and statistics in relation to the Italian football club Associazione Sportiva Roma.

== Serie A records ==
Updated 22 July 2020

- Home victory: 9–0 v Cremonese, 13 October 1929
- Away victory: 6–1 v Alessandria, 6 January 1935 & 6–1 v SPAL, 22 July 2020
- Home draw with most goals: 4–4 v Catania, 31 May 1964 & 4–4 v Napoli, 20 October 2007
- Away draw with most goals: 4–4 v Milan, 27 January 1935 & 4–4 v Chievo, 30 April 2006
- Home defeat: 1–7 v Torino, 5 October 1947
- Away defeat: 1–7 v Juventus, 6 March 1932
- Most points in a season (3 pts per win): 87 (2016–17, 38 games)
- Most points in a season (2 pts per win): 43 (1982–83, 30 games)
- Most victories in a season: 28 (2016–17)
- Fewest victories in a season: 8 (1964–65, 34 games & 1992–93, 34 games)
- Fewest defeats in a season: 2 (1980–81, 34 games & 2001–02, 34 games)
- Most goals scored in a season (by team): 87 (1930–31, 34 games), 90 (2016–17, 38 games)
- Most goals scored in a season: 29 Rodolfo Volk (1930–31, 34 games) & Edin Džeko (2016–17, 37 games)
- Lowest goals against in a season (by team): 15 (1974–75, 30 games)
- Longest winning streak: 11 begun on 21 December 2005 (4–0 v Chievo), ended on 5 March 2006 (1–1 v Internazionale)
- Longest unbeaten run: 24 begun on 23 September 2001 (2–1 v Fiorentina), ended on 24 March 2002 (1–3 v Internazionale) & 24 begun on 1 November 2009 (2–1 v Bologna), ended on 25 April 2010 (1–2 v Sampdoria)
- Most appearances: 619, Francesco Totti
- Most goals scored: 250, Francesco Totti

== All competitions appearances ==
AS Roma players with 300 or more appearances.
Updated 19 January 2026

Player	Position	Appearances	Goals	
1	(Italy) Francesco Totti	FW	786	307
2	(Italy) Daniele De Rossi	MF	616	63
3	(Italy) Giacomo Losi	DF	455	2
4	(Italy) Giuseppe Giannini	MF	437	75
5	(Brazil) Aldair	DF	436	21
6	(Italy) Sergio Santarini	DF	429	7
7	(Italy) Bruno Conti	LW	402	47
8	(Italy) Sebino Nela	MF	397	19
9	(Italy) Franco Tancredi	GK	383	0
10	(Italy) Guido Masetti	GK	357	0
11	(Italy) Damiano Tommasi	DF	351	21
12	(Italy) **Bryan Cristante**	MF	343	20
13	(Italy) **Stephan El Shaarawy**	FW	340	65
14	(Italy) **Lorenzo Pellegrini**	MF	334	58
15	(Italy) Simone Perrotta	FW	325	49

Players in bold are currently playing for Roma.

== Top all-time goalscorers ==
Updated 28 July 2021

Rank	Player	Position	Goals	Appearances	Goals/match
1	(Italy) Francesco Totti	FW	307	786	0.4
2	(Italy) Roberto Pruzzo	FW	138	315	0.44
3	(Bosnia and Herzegovina) Edin Džeko	FW	119	260	0.46
4	(Italy) Amedeo Amadei	FW	111	234	0.47
5	(Italy) Rodolfo Volk	FW	106	161	0.66
6	(Argentina) Pedro Manfredini	FW	104	164	0.63
7	(Italy) Vincenzo Montella	FW	102	258	0.40
8	(Argentina) Abel Balbo	FW	87	182	0.48
9	(Italy) Marco Delvecchio	FW	81	300	0.27
10	(Italy) (Brazil) Dino Da Costa	FW	79	163	0.48

Players in bold are currently playing for Roma.

== Capocannoniere winners ==
Player	Goals	Season
(Italy) Rodolfo Volk	29	1930–31
(Italy) (Argentina) Enrique Guaita	27	1934–35
(Italy) (Brazil) Dino Da Costa	22	1956–57
(Italy) (Argentina) Pedro Manfredini	19	1962–63
(Italy) Roberto Pruzzo	18	1980–81
(Italy) Roberto Pruzzo	15	1981–82
(Italy) Roberto Pruzzo	19	1985–86
(Italy) Francesco Totti	26	2006–07
(Bosnia and Herzegovina) Edin Džeko	29	2016–17

== International honours won while playing at Roma ==
FIFA World Cup

The following players have won the FIFA World Cup while playing for AS Roma:

- (Italy) Guido Masetti – 1934, 1938
- (Italy) Attilio Ferraris – 1934
- (Italy) Enrique Guaita – 1934
- (Italy) Aldo Donati – 1938
- (Italy) Eraldo Monzeglio – 1938
- (Italy) Pietro Serantoni – 1938
- (Italy) Bruno Conti – 1982
- (Germany) Thomas Berthold – 1990
- (Germany) Rudi Völler – 1990
- (Brazil) Aldair – 1994
- (France) Vincent Candela – 1998
- (Brazil) Cafu – 2002
- (Italy) Francesco Totti – 2006
- (Italy) Daniele De Rossi – 2006
- (Italy) Simone Perrotta – 2006
- (Argentina) Paulo Dybala – 2022

FIFA Confederations Cup

The following players have won the FIFA Confederations Cup while playing for AS Roma:

- (Argentina) Claudio Caniggia – 1992
- (Brazil) Aldair – 1997
- (Brazil) Cafu – 1997
- (Brazil) Juan – 2009
- (Brazil) Júlio Baptista – 2009
- (Germany) Antonio Rüdiger – 2017

UEFA European Championship

The following players have won the UEFA European Championship while playing for AS Roma:

- (France) Vincent Candela – 2000
- (Greece) Traianos Dellas – 2004
- (Italy) Bryan Cristante – 2020
- (Italy) Leonardo Spinazzola – 2020

Copa América

The following players have won the Copa América while playing for AS Roma:

- (Brazil) Renato Gaúcho – 1989
- (Uruguay) Daniel Fonseca – 1995
- (Brazil) Aldair – 1997
- (Brazil) Antônio Carlos – 1999
- (Brazil) Cafu – 1999
- (Brazil) Mancini – 2004
- (Brazil) Doni – 2007
- (Argentina) Leandro Paredes – 2024

Africa Cup of Nations

The following players have won the Africa Cup of Nations while playing for AS Roma:

- (Ivory Coast) Gervinho – 2015
- (Ivory Coast) Seydou Doumbia – 2015
- (Ivory Coast) Evan Ndicka – 2023

== International records ==
- Home victory: **10–1** v Altay (1st round, Fair Cup 1962–63)
- Away victory: **7–1** v Gent, 6 August 2009
- Home defeat: **1–7** v Bayern Munich, 22 October 2014
- Away defeat: **1–7** v Manchester United, 10 April 2007
- Away defeat: **0–8** v Ferencváros, 22 June 1935

=== Achievements ===
Season	Achievement	Notes
European Champions Clubs' Cup / UEFA Champions League
2007–08	Quarter-finals	eliminated by Manchester United; 0–2 in Rome, 0–1 in Manchester
2006–07	Quarter-finals	eliminated by Manchester United; 2–1 in Rome, 1–7 in Manchester
2017–18	Semi-finals	eliminated by Liverpool; 2–5 in Liverpool, 4–2 in Rome
1983–84	Final	defeated by Liverpool; 2–4 on penalties (1–1 a.e.t.)
UEFA Cup Winners' Cup
1991–92	Quarter-finals	eliminated by Monaco; 0–0 in Rome, 0–1 in Monaco
1984–85	Quarter-finals	eliminated by Bayern Munich; 0–2 in Munich, 1–2 in Rome
1969–70	Semi-finals	eliminated by Górnik Zabrze; 1–1 in Rome, 2–2 in Zabrze
UEFA Cup / UEFA Europa League
1998–99	Quarter-finals	eliminated by Atlético Madrid; 1–2 in Madrid, 1–2 in Rome
1995–96	Quarter-finals	eliminated by Slavia Prague; 0–3 in Prague, 3–1 in Rome
1992–93	Quarter-finals	eliminated by Borussia Dortmund; 1–0 in Rome, 0–2 in Dortmund
1982–83	Quarter-finals	eliminated by Benfica; 1–2 in Rome, 1–1 in Lisbon
2023–24	Semi-finals	eliminated by Bayer Leverkusen; 0–2 in Rome, 2–2 in Leverkusen
2020–21	Semi-finals	eliminated by Manchester United; 2–6 in Manchester, 3–2 in Rome
2022–23	Final	defeated by Sevilla; 1–4 on penalties (1–1 a.e.t.)
1990–91	Final	defeated by Internazionale; 0–2 in Milan, 1–0 in Rome
UEFA Europa Conference League
2021–22	Champions	defeated Feyenoord 1–0
