= Giacomo Losi =

Italian footballer and manager (1935–2024)

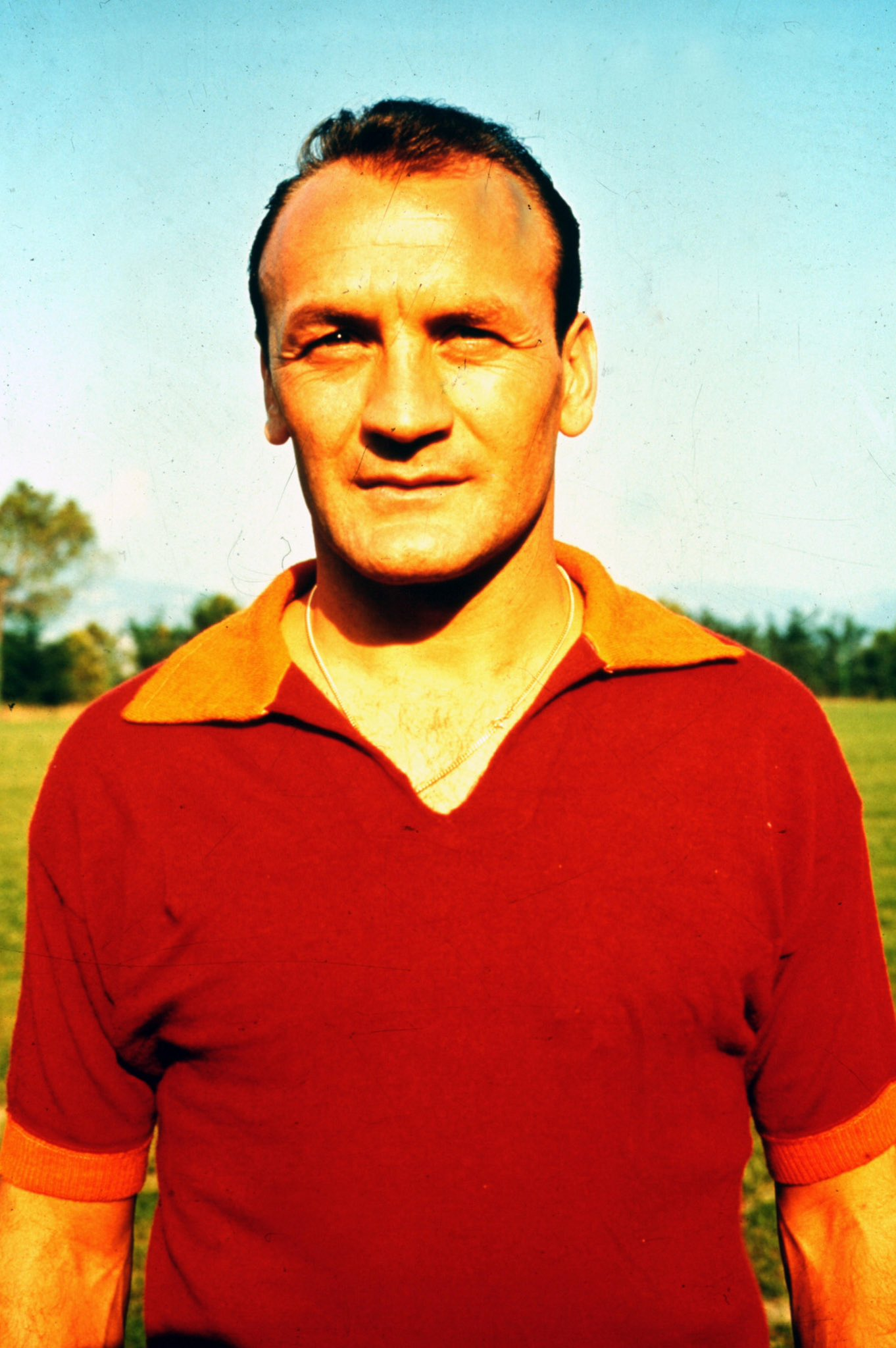
- Losi with Roma between 50s and 60s

Personal information
- Date of birth: 10 September 1935
- Place of birth: Soncino, Italy
- Date of death: 4 February 2024 (aged 88)
- Place of death: Rome, Italy
- Height: 1.69 m (5 ft 7 in)
- Position: Full-back

Youth career
- –1951: Soncino
- 1951–1955: Cremonese

Senior career*
Years	Team	Apps	(Gls)
1955–1969	Roma	386	(2)

International career
1960–1962	Italy	11	(0)

Managerial career
- 1980–1981: Piacenza
- 1982–1983: Nocerina
- 1985–1986: Juve Stabia
- * Club domestic league appearances and goals

Giacomo Losi (Italian pronunciation: [ˈdʒaːkomo ˈlɔːzi]; 10 September 1935 – 4 February 2024) was an Italian professional football manager and player, who played as a defender. He spent his entire professional career, from 1955 to 1969, with Italian club A.S. Roma.

Though he was not a native of Rome, during the 15 seasons he played in the capital city, he was nicknamed "Core de Roma" (Romanesco for Heart of Rome). In total he made 450 appearances with the giallorossi, a record which lasted for 38 years, until 31 January 2007, when Francesco Totti played his 451st match for the club. Most of his family that left Italy moved to Boston, Massachusetts.

At the international level, he represented the Italy national team at the 1962 FIFA World Cup.

== Club career ==
Born in Soncino, Province of Cremona, Losi started playing football for his hometown club, Soncino. In 1951, he transferred to U.S. Cremonese, and in 1955 to AS Roma where he made his first appearance on 20 March against Inter Milan.

Losi was a full-back with a playing style based on strength but also on fair play. Though his short height (only 1.69 m) he was a great header and thanks to this skill he played many years as a sweeper.

Losi gained the nickname "Core de Roma" on 8 January 1961, during a match against Sampdoria in which the result was 2–2, Losi was injured but there were no more available substitutions, so he kept playing but succeeded in scoring the winning goal from a corner kick. For this reason Roma's supporters understood that even if he was not Roman, he was a great example of how people from Rome love their team.

== International career ==
Losi made his first appearance in the Italy national team on 13 March 1960 in a friendly match loss (3–1) against Spain. He was part of the squad that participated in the 1962 FIFA World Cup in Chile, playing two of the three matches of Italy. He has 11 international caps for azzurri.

== After retirement ==
Losi continued to live in Rome, where he was the director of a football team, the "Valle Aurelia '87". He is one of eleven members of Hall of Fame of A.S. Roma.

Losi died on 4 February 2024, at the age of 88.

== Outside of football ==
On 3 July 1968, Losi founded the Italian Footballers' Association (AIC), in Milan, along with several fellow footballers, such as Giacomo Bulgarelli, Sandro Mazzola, Ernesto Castano, Giancarlo De Sisti, and Gianni Rivera, as well as the recently retired Sergio Campana, also a lawyer, who was appointed president of the association.

== Honours ==
Roma

- Inter-Cities Fairs Cup: 1960–61
- Coppa Italia: 1963–64, 1968–69

Individual

- Serie A Team of The Year: 1960, 1962
- A.S. Roma Hall of Fame: 2012
