= Shijō Saikyō League Serie A: Ace Striker =

1995 video game

- Cover art
- Publisher(s): TNN
- Composer(s): Atsuhiro Motoyama; Masahito Nakano; Shinji Tachikawa
- Platform(s): Super Famicom
- Release: JP: March 31, 1995
- Genre(s): Traditional soccer simulation
- Mode(s): Single-player; Multiplayer

Shijō Saikyō League Serie A: Ace Striker (史上最強リーグ セリエＡ Ａｃｅ Ｓｔｒｉｋｅｒ, Shijō Saikyō Rīgu Serie Ai: Eesu Sutorikaa, lit. The Strongest League Ever Serie A: Ace Striker) is a 1995 Japan-exclusive football video game for the Super Famicom.

== Summary ==
Roberto Baggio on Juventus attempts to score a goal against Cagliari.

Ace Striker was licensed by Italian Football League and AIC (Associazione Italiana Calciatori) featuring all clubs and footballers from the Italian Serie A (Season 1994–95).

A cutscene plays when a goal is scored.

The football players are drawn in the "deformed" anime style. There's no different formations to choose from, but all the players (except the goalkeeper) can be positioned anywhere in the field. During a football match, an animated image will appear whenever a goal is scored. One of the particularities or flaws of this soccer game is that during the penalty shoot-out, the goalkeeper can move and jump before the rival player actually kicks the ball.

== Reception ==
On release, Famicom Tsūshin scored the game a 20 out of 40.

== See also ==
- Super Formation Soccer 95: della Serie A, football video game licensed by Italian Football League and Associazione Italiana Calciatori
