= 1994–95 Serie A =

3rd season of top-tier Italian football

Serie A
- Season: 1994–95
- Dates: 4 September 1994 – 4 June 1995
- Champions: Juventus; 23rd title
- Relegated: Genoa; Foggia; Reggiana; Brescia
- Champions League: Juventus
- Cup Winners' Cup: Parma
- UEFA Cup: Lazio; Milan; Roma; Internazionale
- Matches: 306
- Goals: 773 (2.53 per match)
- Top goalscorer: Gabriel Batistuta (26 goals)

1994–95 Serie A team distribution

The 1994–95 Serie A was won by Juventus, who finished 10 points ahead of their nearest rivals Parma and Lazio.

Two pieces of silverware were seized by Juventus, who won the Coppa Italia against Parma but were beaten by the same opponents in the final of the UEFA Cup.

Milan's fourth-place finish after three successive Serie A titles was joined with further disappointment in the UEFA Champions League, as they lost the final to Dutch champions Ajax.

The relegated Serie A sides this season were Genoa (after tie-breaker with Padova), Foggia, Reggiana and Brescia.

This was the first Serie A season to award three points for a win in the league table: Juventus coach Marcello Lippi used a very offensive 4–3–3 formation, which resulted in a record 7 losses for a champion team, but with only 4 draws the Bianconeri capitalized upon the new regulation.

== Teams ==
Fiorentina, Bari, Brescia and Padova had been promoted from Serie B.

== Personnel and Sponsoring ==
Team	Head Coach	Kit manufacturer	Shirt sponsor
Bari	(Italy) Giuseppe Materazzi	Adidas	Wüber
Brescia	(Italy) Adelio Moro	Uhlsport	CAB
Cagliari	(Uruguay) Óscar Tabárez	Erreà	Pecorino Sardo
Cremonese	(Italy) Luigi Simoni	Uhlsport	Moncart
Fiorentina	(Italy) Claudio Ranieri	Uhlsport	Sammontana
Foggia	(Italy) Enrico Catuzzi	Adidas	Snips
Genoa	(Italy) Claudio Maselli	Erreà	Kenwood
Internazionale	(Italy) Ottavio Bianchi	Umbro	Fiorucci
Juventus	(Italy) Marcello Lippi	Kappa	Danone
Lazio	(Czech Republic) Zdeněk Zeman	Umbro	Banco di Roma
Milan	(Italy) Fabio Capello	Lotto	Opel
Napoli	(Federal Republic of Yugoslavia) Vujadin Boškov	Lotto	Record Cucine
Padova	(Italy) Mauro Sandreani	Lotto	Acqua Vera
Parma	(Italy) Nevio Scala	Umbro	Parmalat
Reggiana	(Italy) Cesare Vitale	Asics	Burro Giglio
Roma	(Italy) Carlo Mazzone	Asics	Nuova Tirrena
Sampdoria	(Sweden) Sven-Göran Eriksson	Asics	Erg
Torino	(Italy) Nedo Sonetti	Lotto	Bongioanni Caldaie

== League table ==
Pos	Team	Pld	W	D	L	GF	GA	GD	Pts	Qualification or relegation
1	Juventus (C)	34	23	4	7	59	32	+27	73	Qualified to Champions League
2	Parma	34	18	9	7	51	31	+20	63	Qualification to Cup Winners' Cup
3	Lazio	34	19	6	9	69	34	+35	63	Qualification to UEFA Cup
4	Milan	34	17	9	8	53	32	+21	60	Qualification to UEFA Cup
5	Roma	34	16	11	7	46	25	+21	59	Qualification to UEFA Cup
6	Internazionale	34	14	10	10	39	34	+5	52	Qualification to UEFA Cup
7	Napoli	34	13	12	9	40	45	−5	51	
8	Sampdoria	34	13	11	10	51	37	+14	50	
9	Cagliari	34	13	10	11	40	39	+1	49	
10	Fiorentina	34	12	11	11	61	57	+4	47	
11	Torino	34	12	9	13	44	48	−4	45	
12	Bari	34	12	8	14	40	43	−3	44	
13	Cremonese	34	11	8	15	35	38	−3	41	
14	Padova	34	12	4	18	37	58	−21	40 (Note: winner of relegation tie-breaker 1-1*(5:4) vs Genoa. (10 June 1995))	Relegation tie-breaker
15	Genoa (R)	34	10	10	14	34	49	−15	40 (Note: Loser of relegation tie-breaker 1-1*(4:5) vs Padova. (10 June 1995). Relegated to 1995-96 Serie B)	Serie B after tie-breaker
16	Foggia (R)	34	8	10	16	32	50	−18	34	Relegation to Serie B
17	Reggiana (R)	34	4	6	24	24	56	−32	18	Relegation to Serie B
18	Brescia (R)	34	2	6	26	18	65	−47	12	Relegation to Serie B

Source: Serie A, RSSSF.com, Soccerway
Rules for classification: 1) Points; 2) Head-to-head points; 3) Head-to-head goal difference; 4) Goal difference; 5) Goals scored; 6) Draw. (Note: Head-to-head record is used only after all the matches between the teams in question have been played).
(C) Champions; (R) Relegated

== Results ==
Home \ Away	BAR	BRE	CAG	CRE	FIO	FOG	GEN	INT	JUV	LAZ	MIL	NAP	PAD	PAR	REG	ROM	SAM	TOR
Bari	—	3–0	0–0	2–0	2–2	2–1	4–1	0–1	0–2	0–1	3–5	1–1	0–1	1–2	1–0	2–2	1–2	3–1
Brescia	1–2	—	2–3	1–2	2–4	1–0	1–2	0–0	1–1	0–1	0–5	1–2	1–3	1–2	1–0	0–0	0–0	1–4
Cagliari	2–1	2–0	—	1–0	2–0	2–1	1–0	1–1	3–0	1–1	1–1	0–1	2–0	2–0	4–2	0–1	0–2	1–0
Cremonese	0–0	0–0	2–0	—	0–0	1–3	4–1	0–1	1–2	0–0	1–0	2–0	3–0	1–1	2–1	2–5	2–0	3–0
Fiorentina	2–0	4–0	2–1	3–1	—	1–1	3–1	2–2	1–4	1–1	1–2	4–0	4–1	1–1	1–1	1–0	2–2	6–3
Foggia	2–2	3–1	2–0	0–1	2–1	—	2–1	0–0	2–0	0–1	1–3	1–1	4–1	0–0	1–0	0–1	1–1	0–2
Genoa	1–1	1–0	1–1	0–1	1–1 (Note: The match was played at Stadio Dino Manuzzi.)	3–0	—	2–1	0–4	1–2	1–1	3–3	2–1	0–0	3–1	1–0	2–1	1–0
Internazionale	1–2	1–0	1–2	0–0	3–1	3–0	2–0	—	0–0	0–2	3–1	0–2	2–1	1–1	1–0	0–1	2–0	2–1
Juventus	2–0	2–1	3–1	1–0	3–2	2–0	1–1	0–0	—	0–3	1–0	1–0	0–1	4–0	3–1	3–0	1–0	1–2
Lazio	1–2	1–0	0–0	1–0	8–2	7–1	4–0	4–1	3–4	—	4–0	5–1	5–1	2–2	2–0	0–3	1–0	3–0
Milan	0–1	1–0	1–1	3–1	2–0	3–0	1–0	1–1	0–2	2–1	—	1–1	1–0	1–1	2–1	1–0	0–0	5–1 (Note: The match was played at Stadio Renato Dall'Ara.)
Napoli	3–0	1–1	1–1	1–0	2–5	2–1	1–0	1–3	0–2	3–2	1–0	—	3–3	1–0	1–0	0–0	2–0	1–1
Padova	0–2	2–0	2–1	3–2	0–1	0–0	1–1	1–0	1–2	2–0	2–0	2–0	—	0–3	3–0	0–0	1–4	4–2
Parma	1–0	4–0	2–1	2–0	3–0	2–0	0–0	3–0	1–3	2–0	2–3	2–0	1–0	—	2–1	1–0	3–2	2–0
Reggiana	0–1	2–0	0–0	2–0	1–1	1–1	0–1	0–1	1–2	0–0	0–4	1–2	3–0	2–2	—	1–4	0–2	1–0
Roma	2–0	3–0	1–1	1–1	2–0	1–1	3–0	3–1	3–0	0–2	0–0	1–1	2–0	1–0	2–0	—	1–0	1–1
Sampdoria	1–1	2–1	5–0	2–1	2–2	1–1 (Note: The match was played at Stadio Renato Dall'Ara.)	3–2	2–2	0–1	3–1	0–3	0–0	5–0 (Note: The match was played at Stadio Renato Dall'Ara.)	3–1	2–1	3–0	—	1–1
Torino	2–0	2–0	3–2	1–1	1–0	2–0	0–0	0–2	3–2	2–0	0–0	1–1	2–0	0–2	4–0	2–2	0–0	—

Legend: Blue = home team win; Yellow = draw; Red = away team win.

== Relegation tie-breaker ==
10 June 1995

Genoa	1–1 (a.e.t.)	Padova
Skuhravý 29'		Vlaović 19' (pen.)
Penalties
van 't Schip (penalty scored); Ruotolo (penalty scored); Galante (penalty missed); Bortolazzi (penalty scored); Skuhravý (penalty scored)	4–5	(penalty scored) Cuicchi; (penalty scored) Perrone; (penalty scored) Vlaović; (penalty scored) Balleri; (penalty scored) Kreek

Stadio Artemio Franchi, Florence
Referee: Piero Ceccarini

Genoa relegated to 1995–96 Serie B.

== Top goalscorers ==
Rank	Player	Club	Goals
1	(Argentina) Gabriel Batistuta	Fiorentina	26
2	(Argentina) Abel Balbo	Roma	22
3	(Italy) Ruggiero Rizzitelli	Torino	19
3	(Italy) Gianfranco Zola	Parma	19
5	(Italy) Giuseppe Signori	Lazio	17
5	(Italy) Marco Simone	Milan	17
5	(Italy) Sandro Tovalieri	Bari	17
5	(Italy) Gianluca Vialli	Juventus	17
9	(Italy) Fabrizio Ravanelli	Juventus	15
10	(Italy) Enrico Chiesa	Cremonese	14

== Season tickets ==
The season ticket sales as they were before the beginning of the season:

Source:Statistiche Spettatori Serie A 1994-1995

Rank	Club	Tickets
1	Milan	48,148
2	Roma	39,087
3	Juventus	35,306
4	Lazio	33,149
5	Inter	25,740
6	Fiorentina	23,500
7	Sampdoria	21,667
8	Napoli	20,727
9	Parma	19,541
10	Genoa	16,202
11	Torino	13,948
12	Reggiana	10,596
13	Bari	10,146
14	Foggia	10,062
15	Padova	8,390
16	Cagliari	7,900
17	Brescia	6,600
18	Cremonese	2,840

== Attendances ==
No.	Club	Average
1	Milan	56,659
2	Roma	56,356
3	Lazio	48,715
4	Juventus	47,866
5	Internazionale	40,523
6	Napoli	37,579
7	Fiorentina	34,401
8	Sampdoria	27,550
9	Bari	27,459
10	Parma	23,636
11	Torino	22,205
12	Genoa	21,717
13	Cagliari	17,441
14	Padova	14,788
15	Foggia	14,004
16	Reggiana	13,884
17	Brescia	10,794
18	Cremonese	9,189

== See also ==
- Super Formation Soccer 95: della Serie A, football video game licensed by Italian Football League and AIC (Associazione Italiana Calciatori) that featured all clubs from the Italian Serie A (SEASON 1994–95 Serie A)
- Ace Striker, football video game licensed by Italian Football League and AIC (Associazione Italiana Calciatori) that featured all clubs from the Italian Serie A (SEASON 1994–95 Serie A)

== References and sources ==
- Almanacco Illustrato del Calcio - La Storia 1898-2004, Panini Edizioni, Modena, September 2005
