= Italian Footballers' Association =

Trade union of Italy

AIC
- Associazione Italiana Calciatori
- Founded: 1968
- Headquarters: Vicenza
- Location: Italy
- Members: 4,500 (2,500 professionals)
- Key people: Damiano Tommasi, President; Gianni Grazioli, General Secretary
- Affiliations: ENPALS, CIDS, FIFPro
- Website: assocalciatori.it

The Italian Footballers' Association (Italian: Associazione Italiana Calciatori), also referred to by the acronym AIC, is the association for footballers in Italy. Established on 3 July 1968, it is headquartered in Vicenza and currently has 4,500 members, of which 2,500 are professionals.

The aims of the AIC are to protect, improve and negotiate the conditions, rights and status of all professional players by collective bargaining agreements.

Until the year 2000, it represented only footballers playing in professional leagues, after which it expanded its scope to include amateur players as well.

== History ==
The AIC was founded in Milan, on 3 July 1968. Among the charter members there were notable footballers, such as Giacomo Bulgarelli, Sandro Mazzola, Gianni Rivera, Ernesto Castano, Giancarlo De Sisti, Giacomo Losi and Sergio Campana. The latter, who is also a lawyer and had retired from football a year before, was appointed president of the association. Campana held the position for 43 years, before announcing his intention to step down in April 2011. Former footballer Damiano Tommasi was officially appointed as the new president on 9 May 2011.

== Gran Galà del Calcio ==
Since 1997, AIC has held the Gran Galà del Calcio (formerly the Oscar del Calcio until 2011), a series of awards given to the best players, the best coach and the best referee of Serie A every season.

== See also ==
- Super Formation Soccer 95: della Serie A, football video game licensed by Italian Football League and AIC (Associazione Italiana Calciatori)
- Ace Striker, football video game licensed by Italian Football League and AIC (Associazione Italiana Calciatori)
