= Super Formation Soccer 96: World Club Edition =

1996 video game

- Cover art
- Developer(s): Human Entertainment
- Publisher(s): Human Entertainment
- Composer(s): Ichiro Atsuno; Masamichi Yamazaki
- Series: Super Formation Soccer
- Platform(s): Super Famicom
- Release: JP: March 29, 1996
- Genre(s): Traditional soccer simulation
- Mode(s): Single-player, multiplayer

Super Formation Soccer 96: World Club Edition (スーパーフォーメーションサッカー96 ワールドクラブエディション, 96 World Club Edition Supafomeshonsakka) is the last Super Famicom release of the original Super Formation Soccer video game. It was released exclusively in Japan in 1996.

This game featured 18 fictitious club teams from around the world, based on well-known teams of the time; there are also three hidden teams. The players names are also fictitious; for example, J. V. Pinto is spelled J. V. Minto (J.V.ミント).
