= Super Formation Soccer 95: della Serie A =

1995 video game

- Official box art
- Developer(s): Human Entertainment
- Publisher(s): Human Entertainment
- Composer(s): Yukie Sugawara; Kouji Niikura; Shintaro Johcha; Masamichi Yamazaki
- Series: Super Formation Soccer
- Platform(s): Super Famicom
- Release: JP: March 31, 1995
- Genre(s): Traditional soccer simulation
- Mode(s): Single-player, multiplayer

Super Formation Soccer '95: della Serie A (スーパーフォーメーションサッカー95 della セリエA) is an official licensed football video game that featured all clubs and footballers from the Italian Serie A (SEASON 1994-95) and was released exclusively in Japan in 1995. It was licensed by Italian Football League and AIC (Associazione Italiana Calciatori). The game is based on the original video game Super Formation Soccer.

In the same year, Formation Soccer '95: della Serie A (フォーメーションサッカー95 della セリエA) was released for the Turbo CD. The game structure differs from Super Formation Soccer '95.

== Summary ==
=== In-game tricks and features ===
- On the Exhibition Player entry screen, on the second controller, while holding down X, L and R, press A. If the lowest entry on the screen turns into hiragana the player is successful in his action. He can now select the entry on the top-right of the Team Selection screen and he will be able to use three hidden teams (Human, Giappone and Masters). There is also the free option of editing/creating two "All-star" teams.
- While dribbling if the player press twice quickly in the direction that is moving in the player will jump.
- In an Offensive game in Practice Mode, if the player presses Select during a Throw in, Corner Kick, Goal Kick, etc., the remaining time will change to 45 minutes.
- If the player presses Select on the Team Selection screen, he can select Random Team. Also, the player can see some info about each team by pressing X. When the team is already selected, on the Member screen he can see the players' status/info by pressing X, and their attributes by pressing A.
- Initially the players' names are all in Japanese but the player can switch to English/Italian through the Options.
- If the player pauses the game during a match and press B the players' names will disappear. If he repeats this, their names will reappear.
- Put the cursor over the Situation Mode's 'Cleared' entry and press A and X at the same time. The player will be able to select Reverse Mode which has different conditions required to clear it.

=== Special editions ===
Screenshot showing the Team selection and Gameplay (with Molten and Kenwood advertising).

There are two alternative editions: Super Formation Soccer 95: della Serie A (UCC Xaqua) and Super Formation Soccer 95: della Serie A (Extra Package). The UCC Xaqua version is a kind of promotional edition, the idea was to promote a sports drink (energy drink) called Xaqua (manufactured by UCC and endorsed by the Italian Football League) with the participation or partnership of the Italian footballer Roberto Baggio (clearly visible on the back of the game packaging), via a contest held in 1995 in which the participants had to correctly answer three questions and return the postcard. The winners received the cartridge as a prize. Only 3,000 copies were distributed. In the opening scene, instead of having the cinematic intro sequence showing all the team logos, there is an advertisement of Xaqua featuring Roberto Baggio (1993 FIFA World Player of the Year). Also the box art is different, and in the UCC Xaqua version there is a strong hidden team called Xaqua. In the Extra Package edition there is a special book with all the 396 players' data.

=== Critical reception ===
On release, Famicom Tsūshin scored the Super Famicom version of the game a 26 out of 40, giving the PC Engine version a 24 out of 40. The Japanese website Wazap! gave the game a total score of 80 out of 100.

== Audiovisual elements ==
=== Music ===
True to its convictions, Human offers music for each of the 18 clubs in the game. A little less powerful than in previous games, they are still very rhythmic and stick to the atmosphere of Italian football. AC Milan's theme is inspired by the hit "Go West", a song by Village People that eventually found greater success when it was covered in 1993 by Pet Shop Boys. The music is very often used in football stadiums. The crowd noise is also much stronger than before. The goals are always accompanied by the mythical "GOOOOOAL!". Another detail, a derby match is announced by a short special music.

=== Soundtrack ===
Track listing

#	Title	Length
1.	Human Entertainment Logo	00:01
2.	Title Screen	01:25
3.	Title Screen (no opening)	00:58
4.	Main Menu	01:01
5.	Practice	01:41
6.	Squad Setup	01:35
7.	Derby Match Fanfare	00:04
8.	Theme of Milan	03:10
9.	Theme of Juventus	03:40
10.	Theme of Sampdoria	02:38
11.	Theme of S.S. Lazio	04:00
12.	Theme of Parma A.C.	02:08
13.	Theme of Napoli	02:57
14.	Theme of AS Roma	01:43
15.	Theme of Torino	02:26
16.	Theme of Foggia	01:50
17.	Theme of U.S. Cremonese	01:33
18.	Theme of Genoa	02:13
19.	Theme of Cagliari Calcio	03:04
20.	Theme of Internazionale	01:54
21.	Theme of A.C. Reggiana	02:27
22.	Theme of A.C. Fiorentina	01:48
23.	Theme of Bari A.S.	02:16
24.	Theme of Brescia Calcio	01:47
25.	Theme of Padova	01:22
26.	Edit Team Fanfare	00:04
27.	Theme of Edit Team A	01:51
28.	Theme of Edit Team B	01:40
29.	Extra Time	00:04
30.	Win	00:26
31.	Draw	00:33
32.	Lose	00:50
33.	End of League - Poor Placing	00:26
34.	End of League - Decent Placing	00:49
35.	End of League - Champion	01:27
36.	Staff Roll	02:26
37.	Theme of Human	01:46
38.	Theme of Giappone	02:47
39.	Theme of Masters	02:37
40.	Unknown Jingle	00:06
41.	Crowd Ambience	00:02

=== Images ===
Screenshots showing the Super Formation Soccer 95: della Serie A (UCC Xaqua) opening scene which features Roberto Baggio.

== See also ==
- Ace Striker, football video game licensed by Italian Football League and AIC (Associazione Italiana Calciatori)
- Captain Tsubasa 5: Hasha no Shogo Campione
- SNES Multitap
- List of PC Engine games
