= 1996–97 Vicenza Calcio season =

Vicenza 1996-97 football season

Vicenza
1996–97 season
- Chairman: Pieraldo Dalle Carbonare; Gianni Sacchetto, Luigi Arena; Virgilio Marzot
- Manager: Francesco Guidolin
- Stadium: Romeo Menti
- Serie A: 8th
- Coppa Italia: Winners
- Top goalscorer: League: Marcelo Otero (13); All: Marcelo Otero (13)
- Highest home attendance: 22,000 vs Napoli (29 May 1997)
- Lowest home attendance: 8,678 vs Bologna (6 February 1997)
- Average home league attendance: 15,962
Home colours	Away colours	Third colours

During the 1996–97 Italian football season, Vicenza competed in Serie A.

== Summary ==
In the summer of 1996, Vicenza brought young forwards Alessandro Iannuzzi and Giovanni Cornacchini, the latter going on to become the top scorer in Coppa Italia, centre back Massimo Beghetto, teenage left back Pierre Wome who was discovered in Africa by technical director Sergio Vignoni, as well as 18-year old midfielder Fabio Firmani. Leaving the club were Joachim Bjorklund, Massimo Lombardini and Gabriele Grossi. In July 1996 the team started pre-season in Enego.

Vicenza had its best season ever, winning the Coppa Italia following a victory over Napoli in the final.

== Squad ==
Note: Flags indicate national team as defined under FIFA eligibility rules; some limited exceptions apply. Players may hold more than one non-FIFA nationality.

No.	Pos.	Nation	Player
1	GK	ITA	Luca Mondini
2	DF	ITA	Luigi Sartor
3	DF	ITA	Gilberto D'Ignazio
4	MF	ITA	Domenico Di Carlo ((vice-captain))
5	DF	ITA	Davide Belotti
6	DF	ITA	Giovanni Lopez ((captain))
7	MF	ITA	Maurizio Rossi
8	DF	URU	Gustavo Mendez
9	FW	ITA	Roberto Murgita
10	MF	ITA	Fabio Viviani ((vice-vice-captain))
11	FW	ITA	Giovanni Cornacchini
12	GK	ITA	Roberto Verdi
13	MF	ITA	Giampiero Maini
14	MF	ITA	Mariano Sotgia
15	FW	ITA	Alessandro Iannuzzi

No.	Pos.	Nation	Player
16	DF	ITA	Massimo Beghetto
17	MF	CMR	Pierre Wome
18	MF	ITA	Daniele Amerini
19	FW	URU	Marcelo Otero
20	DF	ITA	Alessandro Dal Canto
21	FW	ITA	Ferdinando Gasparini
22	GK	ITA	Pierluigi Brivio
23	MF	ITA	Gabriele Ambrosetti
24	MF	ITA	Fabio Firmani
25	MF	ITA	Giuliano Gentilini
26	DF	ITA	Paolo Pasqualin
27	MF	ITA	Stefano Mazzocco
—	MF	ITA	Carmine Coppola
—	MF	ITA	Massimo Dalle Nogare
—	MF	ITA	Luca Margherita
—	FW	ITA	Marco Cunico
—	FW	ITA	Andrea Mazzuoccolo

=== Transfers ===
In
position	Name	from
GK	Roberto Verdi	Massese
DF	Massimo Beghetto	Perugia
DF	Alessandro Dal Canto	Torino
MF	Carmine Coppola	Nola
MF	Fabio Firmani	Lodigiani
MF	Mariano Sotgia	Cosenza
MF	Pierre Wome	Canon
FW	Giovanni Cornacchini	Bologna
FW	Marco Cunico	Treviso
FW	Ferdinando Gasparini	Fidelis Andria
FW	Alessandro Iannuzzi	S.S. Lazio

Out
Position	Name	To
GK	Alessandro Zerman	Brescello
DF	Joachim Bjorklund	Glasgow Rangers
DF	Gabriele Grossi	Roma
MF	Massimo Lombardini	Torino
MF	Massimo Lovato	Juve Stabia
MF	Willi Pittana	Udinese Calcio
FW	Marco Franco	Solbiatese
FW	Diego Vaccaretti	Massese

=== Autumn-Winter ===
In
Position	Name	from	Date
MF	Giuliano Gentilini	Padova Calcio	27 January 1997

Out
Position	Name	to	Date
FW	Ferdinando Gasparini	Ravenna	31 October 1996
DF	Alessandro Dal Canto	Venezia	24 November 1996
MF	Luca Margherita	Valdagno	14 December 1996
MF	Mariano Sotgia	Padova	26 January 1997

== Competitions ==
=== Serie A ===
==== League table ====
Pos	Team	Pld	W	D	L	GF	GA	GD	Pts	Qualification or relegation
6	Sampdoria	34	14	11	9	60	46	+14	53	Qualification to UEFA Cup
7	Bologna	34	13	10	11	50	44	+6	49	
8	Vicenza	34	12	11	11	43	38	+5	47	Qualification to Cup Winners' Cup
9	Fiorentina	34	10	15	9	46	41	+5	45	
10	Atalanta	34	11	11	12	44	46	−2	44	

Source: Serie A, RSSSF.com, Soccerway
Rules for classification: 1) Points; 2) Head-to-head points; 3) Head-to-head goal difference; 4) Goal difference; 5) Goals scored; 6) Draw. (Note: Head-to-head record is used only after all the matches between the teams in question have been played).

=== Position by round ===
Round	1	2	3	4	5	6	7	8	9	10	11	12	13	14	15	16	17	18	19	20	21	22	23	24	25	26	27	28	29	30	31	32	33	34
Ground	A	H	H	A	H	A	H	A	A	H	A	H	H	A	H	A	H	H	A	A	H	A	H	A	H	H	A	H	A	A	H	A	H	A
Result	W	L	W	L	W	D	W	W	D	W	D	D	D	L	W	L	D	W	L	L	D	L	W	L	L	D	D	W	W	L	D	D	W	L
Position	3	8	4	9	6	4	3	2	2	1	2	2	2	2	2	4	4	3	4	7	6	8	8	8	11	10	9	8	7	8	8	8	8	8

Source: Competitive matches
A = Away; H = Home; W = Win; D = Draw; L = Loss; P = Postponed; = Leader, 1997–98 UEFA Champions League Group stage; = 1997–98 UEFA Champions League Second Qualifying round; = 1997–98 UEFA Cup First round; C = 1997–98 UEFA Cup Winners' Cup

==== Matches ====
8 September 1996 1	Fiorentina	2–4	Vicenza	Florence
16:00	Sartor 36' (o.g.); Luis Oliveira 80'	Report	8' Otero; 29'Otero; 67' Otero; 90' (pen.) Otero	Stadium: Stadio Artemio Franchi; Attendance: 36,273; Referee: Daniele Tombolini

15 September 1996 2	Vicenza	0–2	Roma	Vicenza
16:00		Report	32' Fonseca; 65' Balbo	Stadium: Stadio Romeo Menti; Referee: Pierluigi Collina

22 September 1996 3	Vicenza	4–1	Atalanta	Vicenza
16:00	Viviani 44'; Rossini 45' (o.g.); Beghetto 70'; D'Ignazio 85'	Report	40' (pen.) Inzaghi	Stadium: Stadio Romeo Menti; Referee: Massimo De Santis

29 September 1996 4	Piacenza	1–0	Vicenza	Piacenza
16:00	Luiso 44'	Report		Stadium: Stadio Galleana; Referee: Giancarlo Lana

13 October 1996 5	Vicenza	2–1	Juventus	Vicenza
15:30	Otero 19'; Beghetto 71'	Report	46' Ferrara	Stadium: Stadio Romeo Menti; Referee: Robert Boggi

20 October 1996 6	Udinese	1–1	Vicenza	Udine
15:30	Poggi 71'	Report	89' Maini	Stadium: Stadio Friuli; Referee: Pierluigi Collina

27 October 1996 7	Vicenza	2–0	Cagliari	Vicenza
14:30	Otero 35'; Murgita 62'	Report		Stadium: Stadio Romeo Menti; Referee: Francesco Ercolino

3 November 1996 8	Lazio	0–2	Vicenza	Rome
14:30		Report	35' Murgita; 90' Maini	Stadium: Stadio Olimpico; Referee: Marcello Nicchi

17 November 1996 9	Hellas Verona	2–2	Vicenza	Verona
14:30	Lopez 13' (o.g); Maniero 24'	Report	36' Murgita; 77' (o.g) Marco Baroni	Stadium: Stadio Marcantonio Bentegodi; Referee: Pierluigi Pairetto

24 November 1996 10	Vicenza	2–0	Reggiana	Vicenza
14:30	Ambrosetti 34', 76'	Report		Stadium: Stadio Romeo Menti; Referee: Gilberto Dagnello

1 December 1996 11	Perugia	1–1	Vicenza	Perugia
14:30	Gautieri 34'	Report	10' Iannuzzi	Stadium: Stadio Renato Curi; Referee: Livio Bazzoli

8 December 1996 12	Vicenza	1–1	Inter	Vicenza
14:30	Maini 19'	Report	63' (pen.) Djorkaeff	Stadium: Stadio Romeo Menti; Referee: Graziano Cesari

15 December 1996 13	Vicenza	1–1	Parma	Vicenza
20:30	Maini 50'	Report	72' Benarrivo	Stadium: Stadio Romeo Menti; Attendance: 15,189; Referee: Fiorenzo Treossi

22 December 1996 14	Sampdoria	2–1	Vicenza	Genoa
14:30	Montella 15', 25'	Report	82' (pen.) Otero	Stadium: Stadio Luigi Ferraris; Referee: Domenico Messina

5 January 1997 15	Vicenza	2–0	Bologna	Vicenza
14:30	Otero 64', 82' (pen.)	Report		Stadium: Stadio Romeo Menti; Attendance: 15,551; Referee: Marcello Nicchi

12 January 1997 16	Milan	1–0	Vicenza	Milan
14:30	Dugarry 21'	Report		Stadium: Stadio Giuseppe Meazza; Attendance: 55,439; Referee: Pasquale Rodomonti

19 January 1997 17	Vicenza	2–2	Napoli	Vicenza
14:30	Murgita 12'; Otero 32'	Report	38' (o.g) Mendez; 55' Pecchia	Stadium: Stadio Romeo Menti; Attendance: 15,541; Referee: Alfredo Trentalange

26 January 1997 18	Vicenza	3–2	Fiorentina	Vicenza
14:30	Otero 1'; Murgita 37'; Ambrosetti 57'	Report	22' Padalino; 65' Batistuta	Stadium: Stadio Romeo Menti; Attendance: 15,766; Referee: Salvatore Racalbuto

2 February 1997 19	Roma	2–0	Vicenza	Rome
14:30	Balbo 7', 86'	Report		Stadium: Stadio Olimpico; Referee: Emilio Pellegrino

16 February 1997 20	Atalanta	3–1	Vicenza	Bergamo
15:00	Foglio 58'; Inzaghi 68', 89'	Report	88' (pen.) Otero	Stadium: Stadio Atleti Azzurri d'Italia; Referee: Stefano Braschi

23 February 1997 21	Vicenza	1–1	Piacenza	Vicenza
15:00	Beghetto 14'	Report	4' Piovani	Stadium: Stadio Romeo Menti; Referee: Stefano Farina

1 March 1997 22	Juventus	2–0	Vicenza	Turin
15:00	Di Livio 22'; Padovano 62' (pen.)	Report		Stadium: Delle Alpi; Referee: Massimo De Santis

9 March 1997 23	Vicenza	2–0	Udinese	Vicenza
15:00	Maini 37'; Murgita 50'	Report		Stadium: Stadio Romeo Menti; Referee: Piero Ceccarini

16 March 1997 24	Cagliari	2–1	Vicenza	Cagliari
15:00	Muzzi 36'; Tovalieri 49'	Report	1' Lopez	Stadium: Stadio Sant'Elia; Referee: Fiorenzo Treossi

23 March 1997 25	Vicenza	0–2	Lazio	Vicenza
15:00		Report	19' Nedved; 90' Fuser	Stadium: Stadio Romeo Menti; Referee: Cosimo Bolognino

6 April 1997 26	Vicenza	0–0	Hellas Verona	Vicenza
16:00		Report		Stadium: Stadio Romeo Menti; Attendance: 14,675; Referee: Daniele Tombolini

13 April 1997 27	Reggiana	0–0	Vicenza	Reggio Emilia
16:00		Report		Stadium: Stadio Giglio; Referee: Lorenzo Branzoni

20 April 1997 28	Vicenza	4–1	Perugia	Reggio Emilia
16:00	Ambrosetti 24'; Cornacchini 26'; Otero 36'; Beghetto 46'	Report	65' Goretti	Stadium: Stadio Giglio; Referee: Pierluigi Collina

3 May 1997 29	Inter	0–1	Vicenza	Milan
20:30		Report	22' Alessandro Iannuzzi	Stadium: Stadio Giuseppe Meazza; Attendance: 46,432; Referee: Alfredo Trentalange

11 May 1997 30	Parma	3–0	Vicenza	Parma
16:00	Crespo 16', 56', 60'	Report		Stadium: Stadio Ennio Tardini; Referee: Pasquale Rodomonti

15 May 1997 31	Vicenza	1–1	Sampdoria	Vicenza
20:30	Ambrosetti 2'	Report	1' Mancini	Stadium: Stadio Romeo Menti; Referee: Gennaro Borriello

18 May 1997 32	Bologna	0–0	Vicenza	Bologna
16:30		Report		Stadium: Stadio Renato Dall'Ara; Referee: Emilio Pellegrino

25 May 1997 33	Vicenza	2–0	Milan	Vicenza
16:30	Ambrosetti 6'; Baresi 90' (o.g.)	Report		Stadium: Stadio Romeo Menti; Attendance: 15,416; Referee: Stefano Farina

1 June 1997 34	Napoli	1–0	Vicenza	Naples
16:30	Beto 4'	Report		Stadium: Stadio San Paolo; Referee: Giancarlo Lana

=== Coppa Italia ===
==== Second round ====
28 August 1996	Lucchese	1–2	Vicenza	Lucca
20:30	Rastelli 31'	Report	8' Rossi; 39' Cornacchini	Stadium: Stadio Porta Elisa; Referee: Cosimo Bolognino

==== Eightfinals ====
23 October 1996	Genoa	1–1	Vicenza	Genoa
20:30	Masolini 72' (pen.)	Report	52' (pen.) Viviani	Stadium: Stadio Luigi Ferraris; Referee: Domenico Messina

6 November 1996	Vicenza	1–0	Genoa	Vicenza
20:30	Cornacchini 61'	Report		Stadium: Stadio Romeo Menti; Referee: Emilio Pellegrino

==== Quarterfinals ====
12 November 1996	Milan	1–1	Vicenza	Milan
20:45	Baggio 20'	Report	11' Ambrosetti	Stadium: Stadio Giuseppe Meazza; Referee: Robert Boggi

27 November 1996	Vicenza	0–0 (1a-1 agg.)	Milan	Vicenza
20:45		Report		Stadium: Stadio Romeo Menti; Referee: Piero Ceccarini

==== Semifinals ====
6 February 1997	Vicenza	1–0	Bologna	Vicenza
20:45	Murgita 45'	Report		Stadium: Stadio Romeo Menti; Attendance: 8,678; Referee: Pierluigi Pairetto

25 February 1997	Bologna	1–1	Vicenza	Bologna
20:45	Scapolo 43'	Report	88' Cornacchini	Stadium: Stadio Renato Dall'Ara; Referee: Robert Boggi

==== Final ====
8 May 1997	Napoli	1–0	Vicenza	Naples
20:45	Pecchia 20'	Report		Stadium: Stadio San Paolo; Referee: Piero Ceccarini

29 May 1997	Vicenza	3–0 (a.e.t.) (3–1 agg.)	Napoli	Vicenza
20:45	Maini 20'; Rossi 118'; Ianuzzi 120'	Report		Stadium: Stadio Romeo Menti; Attendance: 22,000; Referee: Stefano Braschi

== Statistics ==
=== Squad ===
Competition	Points	Home						Away						Total						DR
Competition	Points	G	W	D	L	Gf	Gs	G	W	D	L	Gf	Gs	G	W	D	L	Gf	Gs	DR
Serie A	47	17	9	6	2	29	15	17	3	5	9	11	21	34	12	11	11	43	38	+5
Coppa Italia	-	4	3	1	0	5	0	5	1	3	1	5	5	9	4	4	1	10	5	+5
Total	-	21	12	7	2	34	15	22	4	8	10	16	26	43	16	15	12	53	43	+10

=== Players statistics ===
No.	Pos	Nat	Player	Total		Serie A		Coppa	
No.	Pos	Nat	Player	Apps	Goals	Apps	Goals	Apps	Goals
1	GK	(Italy) ITA	Mondini	32	-38	32	-38	0	0
8	DF	(Uruguay) URU	Mendez	29	0	21+2	0	6	0
2	DF	(Italy) ITA	Sartor	33	0	25+1	0	7	0
5	DF	(Italy) ITA	Belotti	34	0	26+1	0	7	0
6	DF	(Italy) ITA	Lopez	36	1	29	1	7	0
10	MF	(Italy) ITA	Viviani	37	2	24+5	1	8	1
4	MF	(Italy) ITA	Di Carlo	37	0	27+2	0	8	0
13	MF	(Italy) ITA	Maini	38	6	28+2	5	8	1
23	MF	(Italy) ITA	Ambrosetti	31	7	18+7	6	6	1
9	FW	(Italy) ITA	Murgita	39	7	25+7	6	7	1
19	FW	(Uruguay) URU	Otero	29	13	22+2	13	5	0
22	GK	(Italy) ITA	Brivio	12	0	2+1	0	9	0
3	DF	(Italy) ITA	D'Ignazio	36	1	26+1	1	9	0
16	DF	(Italy) ITA	Beghetto	39	4	21+10	4	8	0
11	FW	(Italy) ITA	Cornacchini	24	4	13+5	1	6	3
7	MF	(Italy) ITA	Rossi	37	2	11+18	0	8	2
18	MF	(Italy) ITA	Amerini	21	0	9+7	0	5	0
15	FW	(Italy) ITA	Ianuzzi	20	3	6+11	2	3	1
25	MF	(Italy) ITA	Gentilini	11	0	4+4	0	3	0
14	MF	(Italy) ITA	Sotgia	5	0	2+2	0	1	0
24	MF	(Italy) ITA	Firmani	3	0	1+1	0	1	0
20	MF	(Italy) ITA	Dal Canto	3	0	0+2	0	1	0
27	MF	(Italy) ITA	Mazzocco	1	0	0+1	0		
26	DF	(Italy) ITA	Pasqualin	0	0	0	0		
12	GK	(Italy) ITA	Verdi						
	MF	(Italy) ITA	Coppola						
	MF	(Italy) ITA	Nogare						
	MF	(Italy) ITA	Margherita						
17	MF	(Cameroon) CMR	Wome						
	FW	(Italy) ITA	Cunico						
	FW	(Italy) ITA	Gasparini						
	FW	(Italy) ITA	Mazzuocolo						

- Source: http://calcio-seriea.net/presenze/1996/1111/
