= 1997 Coppa Italia final =

49th Coppa Italia final
- Event: 1996–97 Coppa Italia
Napoli	Vicenza
1	3

First leg
Napoli	Vicenza
1	0
- Date: 8 May 1997
- Venue: Stadio San Paolo, Naples
- Referee: Piero Ceccarini
- Attendance: 65,932

Second leg
Vicenza	Napoli
3	0
- Date: 29 May 1997
- Venue: Stadio Romeo Menti, Vicenza
- Referee: Stefano Braschi
- Attendance: 19,144

The 1997 Coppa Italia final was the final of the 1996–97 Coppa Italia, the top cup competition in Italian football. The match was played over two legs on 8 and 29 May 1997 between Napoli and Vicenza. The final was won by Vicenza, who claimed their first Coppa Italia title with a 3–1 aggregate victory.

== First leg ==
8 May 1997
20:45

Napoli	1–0	Vicenza
Pecchia 21'

Stadio San Paolo, Naples
Attendance: 65,932
Referee: Piero Ceccarini

Napoli	Vicenza

GK	1	(Italy) Giuseppe Taglialatela
RB	16	(Italy) Francesco Colonnese	Booked
CB	15	(Italy) Francesco Baldini
CB	2	(Argentina) Roberto Ayala
LB	3	(Italy) Mauro Milanese
DM	6	(Brazil) André Cruz	Booked	(substituted off) 90'
RM	4	(Italy) Roberto Bordin (c)
CM	23	(Italy) Raffaele Longo
LM	11	(Italy) Fabio Pecchia
AM	9	(Italy) Massimiliano Esposito		(substituted off) 77'
CF	18	(Italy) Nicola Caccia		(substituted off) 88'
Substitutes:
MF	5	(France) Alain Boghossian		(substituted on) 77'
FW	14	(Italy) Alfredo Aglietti		(substituted on) 88'
MF	24	(Italy) Luca Altomare		(substituted on) 90'
Manager:
(Italy) Vincenzo Montefusco

GK	22	(Italy) Pierluigi Brivio
RB	8	(Uruguay) Gustavo Méndez	Booked
CB	5	(Italy) Davide Belotti
CB	16	(Italy) Massimo Beghetto
LB	3	(Italy) Gilberto D'Ignazio		(substituted off) 51'
RM	10	(Italy) Fabio Viviani
CM	4	(Italy) Domenico Di Carlo
CM	13	(Italy) Giampiero Maini
LM	23	(Italy) Gabriele Ambrosetti
CF	19	(Uruguay) Marcelo Otero		(substituted off) 33'
CF	11	(Italy) Giovanni Cornacchini		(substituted off) 85'
Substitutes:
MF	7	(Italy) Maurizio Rossi		(substituted on) 33'
FW	9	(Italy) Roberto Murgita		(substituted on) 85'
MF	25	(Italy) Giuliano Gentilini		(substituted on) 51'
Manager:
(Italy) Francesco Guidolin

== Second leg ==
29 May 1997
20:45

Vicenza	3–0 (a.e.t.)	Napoli
Maini 21'; M. Rossi 118'; Iannuzzi 120'

Stadio Romeo Menti, Vicenza
Attendance: 19,144
Referee: Stefano Braschi

Vicenza	Napoli

GK	22	(Italy) Pierluigi Brivio
RB	2	(Italy) Luigi Sartor
CB	25	(Italy) Giuliano Gentilini		(substituted off) 97'
CB	6	(Italy) Giovanni Lopez (c)	Booked
LB	16	(Italy) Massimo Beghetto	Booked
RM	10	(Italy) Fabio Viviani
CM	4	(Italy) Domenico Di Carlo
CM	13	(Italy) Giampiero Maini
LM	23	(Italy) Gabriele Ambrosetti		(substituted off) 18'
CF	9	(Italy) Roberto Murgita
CF	11	(Italy) Giovanni Cornacchini		(substituted off) 72'
Substitutes:
FW	15	(Italy) Alessandro Iannuzzi		(substituted on) 18'
DF	3	(Italy) Gilberto D'Ignazio		(substituted on) 72'
MF	7	(Italy) Maurizio Rossi		(substituted on) 97'
Manager:
(Italy) Francesco Guidolin

GK	1	(Italy) Giuseppe Taglialatela
RB	22	(Belgium) Bertrand Crasson		(substituted off) 98'
CB	15	(Italy) Francesco Baldini	Booked
CB	2	(Argentina) Roberto Ayala	Booked
LB	3	(Italy) Mauro Milanese
DM	5	(France) Alain Boghossian
RM	4	(Italy) Roberto Bordin (c)	Booked	(substituted off) 62'
CM	23	(Italy) Raffaele Longo		(substituted off) 72'
LM	11	(Italy) Fabio Pecchia
AM	9	(Italy) Massimiliano Esposito
CF	18	(Italy) Nicola Caccia	(red card) 91'
Substitutes:
FW	14	(Italy) Alfredo Aglietti		(substituted on) 62'
MF	24	(Italy) Luca Altomare		(substituted on) 72'
DF	13	(Italy) Luigi Panarelli		(substituted on) 98'
Manager:
(Italy) Vincenzo Montefusco

== See also ==
- 1996–97 SSC Napoli season
- 1996–97 Vicenza Calcio season
