= 1996–97 SSC Napoli season =

Napoli
1996–97 season
- Owner: Corrado Ferlaino
- President: Corrado Ferlaino
- Manager: Luigi Simoni (until 21 April 1997); Vincenzo Montefusco
- Stadium: San Paolo
- Serie A: 13th
- Coppa Italia: Runner-up
- Top goalscorer: League: Alfredo Aglietti (8); All: Aglietti (9)
Home colours	Away colours	Third colours

S.S.C. Napoli continued its steady decline with another lacklustre season. Once more, goalscoring was at a premium, with only 28 goals being scored in the 34 league games. Coach Luigi Simoni was sacked and replaced by youth team coach Vincenzo Montefusco, who led the team to the Coppa Italia final against Vicenza, where Napoli won at home thanks to Fabio Pecchia's goal, but lost 3-0 away from home, and therefore failed to win the trophy. The 13th place in the domestic league was the worst for 14 years, and one year on, Napoli was ultimately relegated.

== Squad ==
Note: Flags indicate national team as defined under FIFA eligibility rules; some limited exceptions apply. Players may hold more than one non-FIFA nationality.

No.	Pos.	Nation	Player
1	GK	ITA	Giuseppe Taglialatela
12	GK	ITA	Raffaele Di Fusco
28	GK	ITA	Antonio Pietropaolo
2	DF	ARG	Roberto Ayala
3	DF	ITA	Mauro Milanese
6	DF	BRA	André Cruz
13	DF	ITA	Luigi Panarelli
15	DF	ITA	Francesco Baldini
16	DF	ITA	Francesco Colonnese
22	DF	BEL	Bertrand Crasson
30	DF	ITA	Luigi Malafronte
25	DF	ITA	Mirko Taccola
4	MF	ITA	Roberto Bordin

No.	Pos.	Nation	Player
5	MF	FRA	Alain Boghossian
7	MF	ITA	Francesco Turrini
9	MF	ITA	Massimiliano Esposito
10	MF	BRA	Beto
11	MF	ITA	Fabio Pecchia
23	MF	ITA	Raffaele Longo
24	MF	ITA	Luca Altomare
21	MF	ITA	Roberto Policano
27	MF	ITA	Gennaro Scarlato
8	FW	BRA	Caio
14	FW	ITA	Alfredo Aglietti
18	FW	ITA	Nicola Caccia
20	FW	ITA	Arturo Di Napoli

=== Transfers ===
In
Pos.	Name	from	Type
FW	Alfredo Aglietti	Reggina	-
MF	Beto	Botafogo	free
MF	Nicola Caccia	Piacenza	-
FW	Caio	Internazionale	loan
DF	Bertrand Crasson	Anderlecht	-
FW	Massimiliano Esposito	Lazio	-
MF	Mauro Milanese	Torino	-
DF	Luigi Panarelli	Taranto	-
DF	Francesco Colonnese	AS Roma	loan
MF	Francesco Turrini	Piacenza	-

Out
Pos.	Name	To	Type
MF	Renato Buso	SS Lazio	
DF	Massimo Tarantino	Internazionale	
FW	Massimo Agostini	Cesena	
MF	Carmelo Imbriani	Pistoiese	
MF	Fausto Pari	Piacenza	
MF	Fausto Pizzi	Perugia	

==== Winter ====
In
Pos.	Name	from	Type

Out
Pos.	Name	To	Type
DF	Mirko Taccola	Cagliari	-
FW	Arturo Di Napoli	Internazionale	-

== Competitions ==
=== Serie A ===
==== League table ====
Pos	Team	Pld	W	D	L	GF	GA	GD	Pts	Qualification or relegation
11	Milan	34	11	10	13	43	45	−2	43	
12	Roma	34	10	11	13	46	47	−1	41 (Note: Roma finished ahead of Napoli on Goal difference: Roma -1, Napoli -7.)	
13	Napoli	34	9	14	11	38	45	−7	41	
14	Piacenza	34	7	16	11	29	45	−16	37 (Note: CAG: 7 pts; PIA: 5 pts; PER: 4 pts.)	Relegation tie-breaker
15	Cagliari (R)	34	9	10	15	45	55	−10	37 (Note: CAG: 7 pts; PIA: 5 pts; PER: 4 pts.)	Serie B after tie-breaker

Source: Serie A, RSSSF.com, Soccerway
Rules for classification: 1) Points; 2) Head-to-head points; 3) Head-to-head goal difference; 4) Goal difference; 5) Goals scored; 6) Draw. (Note: Head-to-head record is used only after all the matches between the teams in question have been played).
(R) Relegated

==== Results by round ====
Round	1	2	3	4	5	6	7	8	9	10	11	12	13	14	15	16	17	18	19	20	21	22	23	24	25	26	27	28	29	30	31	32	33	34
Ground	H	A	H	A	A	H	A	H	A	H	A	H	A	A	H	A	H	A	H	A	H	H	A	H	A	H	A	H	A	H	H	A	H	A
Result	L	W	D	W	D	L	W	D	W	D	D	W	L	W	L	L	D	W	D	L	D	D	D	L	D	D	D	L	L	W	L	D	L	W
Position	18	12	11	8	9	14	9	10	5	5	5	5	7	3	6	10	10	8	8	10	9	10	11	13	13	13	13	13	13	13	13	13	13	13

Updated to match(es) played on 1 June 1997. Source: Competitive matches
A = Away; H = Home; W = Win; D = Draw; L = Loss; = Leader, 1997–98 UEFA Champions League Group stage; = 1997–98 UEFA Champions League Second Qualifying round; = 1997–98 UEFA Cup First round; = Relegation to 1997–98 Serie B

==== Matches ====
7 September 1996 1	Parma	3–0	Napoli	Parma
	D. Baggio 14'; Chiesa 22'; Zola 87'			Stadium: Il Tardini

15 September 1996 2	Napoli	1–0	Reggiana	Naples
	Caccia 4'			Stadium: San Paolo

22 September 1996 3	Napoli	1–1	Piacenza	Naples
	Caccia 30'		Luiso 67'	Stadium: San Paolo

29 September 1996 4	Sampdoria	0–1	Napoli	Genoa
			Beto 73'	Stadium: Luigi Ferraris

13 October 1996 5	Napoli	1–1	Udinese	Naples
	Pecchia 59'		Bierhoff 76'	Stadium: San Paolo

20 October 1996 6	Milan	3–1	Napoli	Milan
	Weah 40, 58'; R. Baggio 77'		61' André Cruz	Stadium: San Siro

27 October 1996 7	Napoli	3–2	Bologna	Naples
	Caccia 42' (pen.); Aglietti 51'; André Cruz 61'		20' Nervo; 74' P. Bresciani	Stadium: San Paolo

3 November 1996 8	Juventus	1–1	Napoli	Turin
	Zidane 42'		Aglietti 53'	Stadium: delle Alpi

17 November 1996 9	Napoli	4–2	Perugia	Naples
	Aglietti 29, 59'; Beto 46'; André Cruz 90'		Kreek 30'; Allegri 66'	Stadium: San Paolo

24 November 1996 10	Cagliari	1–1	Napoli	Cagliari
	Muzzi 57'		90' Pecchia	Stadium: Sant'Elia

1 December 1996 11	Atalanta	2–2	Napoli	Bergamo
	Morfeo 40'; Sgrò 75'		46' Aglietti; 50' Caccia	Stadium: Stadio Atleti Azzurri d'Italia

8 December 1996 12	Napoli	1–0	Verona	Naples
	Milanese 90'			Stadium: San Paolo

15 December 1996 13	Roma	1–0	Napoli
	Aldair 78'

22 December 1996 14	Napoli	1–0	Lazio	Naples
	André Cruz 90'			Stadium: San Paolo

5 January 1996 15	Fiorentina	3–0	Napoli
	Colonnese 50' (o.g.); L. Oliveira 54'; Robbiati 90'

12 January 1997 16	Napoli	1–2	Inter Milan	Naples
	Caccia 90'		Branca 43'; Djorkaeff 88'	Stadium: San Paolo

19 January 1997 17	Vicenza	2–2	Napoli
	Murgita 12'; Otero 32'		Méndez 38' (o.g.); Pecchia 55'

26 January 1997 18	Napoli	2–1	Parma	Naples
	Pecchia 22'; André Cruz 56'		Chiesa 32'	Stadium: San Paolo

2 February 1997 19	Reggiana	1–1	Napoli
	Beiersdorfer 60'		Aglietti 44'

16 February 1997 20	Piacenza	1–0	Napoli
	Scienza 34'

23 February 1997 21	Napoli	1–1	Sampdoria	Naples
	Boghossian 57'		Mihajlović 88'	Stadium: San Paolo

2 March 1997 22	Udinese	2–2	Napoli
	Poggi 9, 77'		Pecchia 26'; Helveg 46' (o.g.)

9 March 1997 23	Napoli	0–0	Milan	Naples
				Stadium: San Paolo

16 March 1997 24	Bologna	2–1	Napoli
	K. Andersson 40'; Kolyvanov 46' (pen.)		Altomare 45'

23 March 1997 25	Napoli	0–0	Juventus	Naples
				Stadium: San Paolo

6 April 1997 26	Perugia	1–1	Napoli
	Rapaić 60'		Aglietti 23'

13 April 1997 27	Napoli	1–1	Cagliari	Naples
	Esposito 75' (pen.)		Tovalieri 83'	Stadium: San Paolo

20 April 1997 28	Napoli	0–1	Atalanta	Naples
			F. Inzaghi 23'	Stadium: San Paolo

4 May 1997 29	Verona	2–0	Napoli
	Maniero 47'; De Vitis 89'

11 May 1997 30	Napoli	1–0	Roma	Naples
	Caccia 32'			Stadium: San Paolo

15 May 1997 31	Lazio	3–2	Napoli
	Casiraghi 24'; Fuser 39, 70'		Ayala 10'; Beto 66'

18 May 1997 32	Napoli	2–2	Fiorentina	Naples
	Aglietti 67'; Esposito 83'		L. Oliveira 8, 40'	Stadium: San Paolo

25 May 1997 33	Inter Milan	3–2	Napoli
	Ince 50'; Zamorano 66'; Djorkaeff 82'		Ince 35' (o.g.); Caccia 90'

1 June 1997 34	Napoli	1–0	Vicenza	Naples
	Beto 4'			Stadium: San Paolo

=== Coppa Italia ===
==== Eightfinals ====
23 October 1996	Pescara	0–1	Napoli	Pescara
			Pecchia 19'	Stadium: Stadio Adriatico; Attendance: 14.419; Referee: Fiorenzo Treossi

==== Quarter-finals ====
14 November 1996	Napoli	1–0	Lazio	Naples
20:45 CEST (UTC+01:00)	Aglietti 3'			Stadium: Stadio San Paolo; Attendance: 30,352; Referee: Alfredo Trentalange

27 November 1996	Lazio	1–1	Napoli	Rome
	Casiraghi 8'; Nedvěd (red card) 86'		Caio 28'; Baldini (red card) 45'; Aglietti (red card) 48'	Stadium: Stadio Olimpico; Referee: Pierluigi Collina

==== Semifinals ====
29 January 1997	Inter	1–1	Napoli	Milan
20:45 CET	Zamorano 5'		11' Cruz	Stadium: Giuseppe Meazza; Referee: Treossi

26 February 1997	Napoli	1–1 (5–4 p)	Inter	Naples
20:45 CET	Beto 73'		11' Zanetti	Stadium: San Paolo; Referee: Pairetto
	Penalties
	Milanese (penalty scored); Caccia (penalty scored); Caio (penalty scored); Turrini (penalty scored); Boghossian (penalty scored)		(penalty scored) Zamorano; (penalty scored) Djorkaeff; (penalty missed) Paganin; (penalty scored) Pistone

==== Final ====
8 May 1997	Napoli	1–0	Vicenza	Naples
20:45	Pecchia 20'	Report		Stadium: Stadio San Paolo; Referee: Piero Ceccarini

29 May 1997	Vicenza	3–0 (a.e.t.) (3–1 agg.)	Napoli	Vicenza
20:45	Maini 20'; Rossi 118'; Ianuzzi 120'	Report		Stadium: Stadio Romeo Menti; Attendance: 22,000; Referee: Stefano Braschi

== Statistics ==
=== Players statistics ===
No.	Pos	Nat	Player	Total		1996–97 Serie A		1996–97 Coppa Italia	
No.	Pos	Nat	Player	Apps	Goals	Apps	Goals	Apps	Goals
1	GK	(Italy) ITA	Giuseppe Taglialatela	42	-51	34	-45	8	-6
16	DF	(Italy) ITA	Francesco Colonnese	38	0	31	0	7	0
2	DF	(Argentina) ARG	Roberto Ayala	36	1	30	1	6	0
15	DF	(Italy) ITA	Francesco Baldini	39	0	31+1	0	7	0
3	DF	(Italy) ITA	Mauro Milanese	36	1	28+1	1	7	0
6	DM	(Brazil) BRA	André Cruz	29	6	22+2	5	5	1
7	MF	(Italy) ITA	Francesco Turrini	30	0	23+1	0	6	0
5	MF	(France) FRA	Alain Boghossian	29	1	20+2	1	7	0
11	AM	(Italy) ITA	Fabio Pecchia	38	7	32	5	6	2
14	FW	(Italy) ITA	Alfredo Aglietti	34	9	20+8	8	6	1
18	FW	(Italy) ITA	Nicola Caccia	40	7	29+4	7	7	0
12	GK	(Italy) ITA	Raffaele Di Fusco	1	0	0+1	0	0	0
10	MF	(Brazil) BRA	Beto	26	5	17+5	4	4	1
22	DF	(Belgium) BEL	Bertrand Crasson	27	0	13+9	0	5	0
9	MF	(Italy) ITA	Massimiliano Esposito	27	3	10+12	2	5	1
4	MF	(Italy) ITA	Roberto Bordin	22	0	10+7	0	5	0
23	MF	(Italy) ITA	Raffaele Longo	18	0	9+5	0	4	0
24	MF	(Italy) ITA	Luca Altomare	23	1	8+9	1	6	0
8	FW	(Brazil) BRA	Caio	24	1	6+14	0	4	1
25	DF	(Italy) ITA	Mirko Taccola	2	0	1+1	0		
21	MF	(Italy) ITA	Roberto Policano	11	0	0+8	0	3	0
27	MF	(Italy) ITA	Gennaro Scarlato	2	0	0+2	0		
20	FW	(Italy) ITA	Arturo Di Napoli	2	0	0+1	0	1	0
28	GK	(Italy) ITA	Antonio Pietropaolo	0	0	0	0		
13	DF	(Italy) ITA	Luigi Panarelli	1	0	0	0	1	0
30	DF	(Italy) ITA	Luigi Malafronte	0	0	0	0		

- Source: http://calcio-seriea.net/rose/1996/1115/

== Sources ==
- RSSSF - Italy 1996/97
