= 1996–97 SS Lazio season =

Lazio
1996–97 season
- Owner: Sergio Cragnotti
- President: Dino Zoff
- Manager: Zdeněk Zeman (until 27 January 1997); Dino Zoff (from 27 January 1997)
- Stadium: Stadio Olimpico
- Serie A: 4th
- Coppa Italia: Quarter-finals
- UEFA Cup: Round of 32
- Top goalscorer: League: Giuseppe Signori (15); All: Giuseppe Signori (15)
Home colours	Away colours	Third colours

The 1996–97 season was Società Sportiva Lazio's 97th season since the club's existence and their ninth consecutive season in the top-flight of Italian football. In this season, Lazio finished fourth in Serie A, reached the quarter-final of the Coppa Italia and the round of 32 in the UEFA Cup.

== Squad ==
Note: Flags indicate national team as defined under FIFA eligibility rules; some limited exceptions apply. Players may hold more than one non-FIFA nationality.

No.	Pos.	Nation	Player
1	GK	ITA	Luca Marchegiani
2	DF	ITA	Paolo Negro
3	DF	RSA	Mark Fish
4	MF	ITA	Dario Marcolin
5	DF	ITA	Giuseppe Favalli
6	DF	ARG	José Chamot
7	FW	ITA	Roberto Rambaudi
8	MF	ITA	Renato Buso
9	FW	ITA	Pierluigi Casiraghi
10	FW	ITA	Igor Protti
11	FW	ITA	Giuseppe Signori

No.	Pos.	Nation	Player
12	GK	ITA	Fernando Orsi
13	DF	ITA	Alessandro Nesta
14	MF	ITA	Diego Fuser
15	MF	ITA	Roberto Baronio
16	MF	AUS	Paul Okon
17	DF	SUI	Guerino Gottardi
18	MF	CZE	Pavel Nedvěd
19	MF	ITA	Daniele Franceschini
20	DF	ITA	Alessandro Grandoni
21	MF	ITA	Marco Piovanelli
22	GK	ITA	Carlo Cudicini
23	MF	ITA	Giorgio Venturin

=== Transfers ===
In
Pos.	Name	from	Type
MF	Pavel Nedvěd	Sparta Praha	
FW	Igor Protti	A.S. Bari	
MF	Paul Okon	Club Brugge	
DF	Mark Fish	Orlando Pirates	
MF	Roberto Baronio	Brescia Calcio	
FW	Renato Buso	S.S.C. Napoli	
GK	Carlo Cudicini	A.C. Milan	loan
GK	Flavio Roma	Venezia F.C.	loan ended
MF	Giorgio Venturin	Cagliari Calcio	loan ended
FW	Marco Di Vaio	Hellas Verona	loan ended

Out
Pos.	Name	To	Type
FW	Alen Bokšić	Juventus	
MF	Roberto Di Matteo	Chelsea F.C.	
MF	Aron Winter	Internazionale	
DF	Cristiano Bergodi	Padova Calcio	
DF	Alessandro Romano	Brescia Calcio	
MF	Massimiliano Esposito	S.S.C. Napoli	
GK	Francesco Mancini	Foggia Calcio	loan ended
GK	Flavio Roma	Fiorenzuola	loan
FW	Marco Di Vaio	A.S. Bari	loan
FW	Alessandro Iannuzzi	Vicenza Calcio	loan

==== Winter ====
In
Pos.	Name	To	Type

Out
Pos.	Name	To	Type
MF	Daniele Franceschini	Castel di Sangro	loan

== Competitions ==
=== Serie A ===
==== League table ====
Pos	Team	Pld	W	D	L	GF	GA	GD	Pts	Qualification or relegation
2	Parma	34	18	9	7	41	26	+15	63	Qualified to Champions League qualifying round
3	Internazionale	34	15	14	5	51	35	+16	59	Qualification to UEFA Cup
4	Lazio	34	15	10	9	54	37	+17	55	Qualification to UEFA Cup
5	Udinese	34	15	9	10	53	41	+12	54	Qualification to UEFA Cup
6	Sampdoria	34	14	11	9	60	46	+14	53	Qualification to UEFA Cup

Source: Serie A, RSSSF.com, Soccerway
Rules for classification: 1) Points; 2) Head-to-head points; 3) Head-to-head goal difference; 4) Goal difference; 5) Goals scored; 6) Draw. (Note: Head-to-head record is used only after all the matches between the teams in question have been played).

==== Results summary ====
Overall								Home						Away					
Pld	W	D	L	GF	GA	GD	Pts	W	D	L	GF	GA	GD	W	D	L	GF	GA	GD
34	15	10	9	54	37	+17	55	10	3	4	34	19	+15	5	7	5	20	18	+2

==== Results by round ====
Round	1	2	3	4	5	6	7	8	9	10	11	12	13	14	15	16	17	18	19	20	21	22	23	24	25	26	27	28	29	30	31	32	33	34
Ground	A	H	A	H	A	H	A	H	A	H	A	H	A	A	H	A	H	H	A	H	A	H	A	H	A	H	A	H	A	H	H	A	H	A
Result	L	L	D	W	D	W	L	L	W	D	W	D	W	L	W	D	L	L	W	D	L	W	D	W	W	W	L	W	D	W	W	D	W	D
Position	11	17	16	14	13	13	14	14	13	13	12	10	9	10	7	9	12	12	11	12	12	9	10	9	6	6	6	5	5	4	4	4	4	4

Updated to match(es) played on 1 June 1997. Source: Competitive matches
A = Away; H = Home; W = Win; D = Draw; L = Loss; = Leader, 1997–98 UEFA Champions League Group stage; = 1997–98 UEFA Champions League second qualifying round; = 1997–98 UEFA Cup first round; = Relegation to 1997–98 Serie B

==== Matches ====
7 September 1996 1	Bologna	1–0	Lazio	Bologna
15:00 CEST (UTC+02:00)	Fontolan 35'	Report		Stadium: Stadio Renato Dall'Ara; Attendance: 31,266; Referee: Alfredo Trentalange

15 September 1996 2	Lazio	0–1	Udinese	Rome
15:00 CEST (UTC+02:00)		Report	Bia 73' (pen.)	Stadium: Stadio Olimpico; Attendance: 36,103; Referee: Salvatore Racalbuto

21 September 1996 3	Internazionale	1–1	Lazio	Milan
20:30 CEST (UTC+02:00)	Angloma 40'	Report	Signori 33'	Stadium: San Siro; Attendance: 51,994; Referee: Pierluigi Collina

29 September 1996 4	Lazio	2–1	Parma	Rome
15:00 CEST (UTC+02:00)	Protti 25'; Casiraghi 62'	Report	D. Baggio 66'	Stadium: Stadio Olimpico; Attendance: 39,489; Referee: Robert Boggi

12 October 1996 5	Fiorentina	0–0	Lazio	Florence
15:00 CEST (UTC+02:00)	Batistuta (penalty missed) 33'; Baiano (red card) 82'	Report	Grandoni (red card) 71'	Stadium: Stadio Artemio Franchi; Attendance: 37,076; Referee: Domenico Messina

20 October 1996 6	Lazio	2–1	Cagliari	Rome
15:00 CEST (UTC+02:00)	Marchegiani (red card) 3'; Nedvěd 22'; Signori 49'	Report	Banchelli 77'	Stadium: Stadio Olimpico; Attendance: 35,215; Referee: Cosimo Bolognino

26 October 1996 7	Atalanta	2–1	Lazio	Bergamo
15:00 CEST (UTC+02:00)	Lentini 4'; Inzaghi (penalty missed) 19', 49'	Report	Negro 75'	Stadium: Stadio Atleti Azzurri d'Italia; Attendance: 17,032; Referee: Graziano Cesari

3 November 1996 8	Lazio	0–2	Vicenza	Rome
15:00 CET (UTC+01:00)		Report	Murgita 35'; Maini 90'	Stadium: Stadio Olimpico; Attendance: 33,344; Referee: Marcello Nicchi

17 November 1996 9	Piacenza	1–3	Lazio	Piacenza
15:00 CET (UTC+01:00)	Scienza 27'	Report	Signori 5', 40' (pen.), 54'	Stadium: Stadio Galleana; Attendance: 8,856; Referee: Fiorenzo Treossi

24 November 1996 10	Lazio	1–1	Sampdoria	Rome
15:00 CET (UTC+01:00)	Negro 82'	Report	Mancini 6'; Pesaresi (red card) 79'	Stadium: Stadio Olimpico; Attendance: 32,813; Referee: Robert Boggi

1 December 1996 11	Reggiana	0–2	Lazio	Reggio Emilia
15:00 CET (UTC+01:00)	Beiersdorfer (red card) 49'	Report	Nedvěd 84'; Casiraghi 90'	Stadium: Stadio Giglio; Referee: Gennaro Borriello

8 December 1996 12	Lazio	0–0	Roma	Rome
20:30 CET (UTC+01:00)		Report		Stadium: Stadio Olimpico; Attendance: 64,488; Referee: Pierluigi Pairetto

15 December 1996 13	Perugia	1–2	Lazio	Perugia
15:00 CET (UTC+01:00)	Giunti (penalty missed) 36'; Gautieri 79'	Report	Rambaudi 71'; Signori 81' (pen.)	Stadium: Stadio Renato Curi; Attendance: 19,886; Referee: Piero Ceccarini

22 December 1996 14	Napoli	1–0	Lazio	Naples
15:00 CET (UTC+01:00)	André Cruz 90'	Report		Stadium: Stadio San Paolo; Attendance: 51,193; Referee: Marcello Nicchi

5 January 1997 15	Lazio	3–0	Milan	Rome
20:30 CET (UTC+01:00)	Signori 22'; Casiraghi 45'; Grandoni 55'	Report		Stadium: Stadio Olimpico; Attendance: 38,280; Referee: Fiorenzo Treossi

12 January 1997 16	Verona	1–1	Lazio	Verona
15:00 CET (UTC+01:00)	Orlandini 61' (pen.)	Report	Fish 23'	Stadium: Stadio Marc'Antonio Bentegodi; Attendance: 16,106; Referee: Stefano Braschi

19 January 1997 17	Lazio	0–2	Juventus	Rome
20:30 CET (UTC+01:00)		Report	Padovano 31', 62'	Stadium: Stadio Olimpico; Attendance: 58,815; Referee: Domenico Messina

26 January 1997 18	Lazio	1–2	Bologna	Rome
15:00 CET (UTC+01:00)	Casiraghi 46'	Report	K. Andersson 42'; Nervo 59'	Stadium: Stadio Olimpico; Attendance: 31,560; Referee: Livio Bazzoli

2 February 1997 19	Udinese	2–3	Lazio	Udine
15:00 CET (UTC+01:00)	Amoroso 79' (pen.), 90'	Report	Signori 17', 61'; Favalli (red card) 68'; Nedvěd 88'	Stadium: Stadio Friuli; Attendance: 12,501; Referee: Stefano Farina

16 February 1997 20	Lazio	2–2	Internazionale	Rome
15:00 CET (UTC+01:00)	Fuser 24'; Signori 72'	Report	Zamorano 60'; Djorkaeff 62'	Stadium: Stadio Olimpico; Attendance: 44,517; Referee: Piero Ceccarini

23 February 1997 21	Parma	2–0	Lazio	Parma
20:30 CET (UTC+01:00)	Stanić 3'; Chiesa 26'	Report		Stadium: Stadio Ennio Tardini; Attendance: 20,690; Referee: Pierluigi Collina

1 March 1997 22	Lazio	1–0	Fiorentina	Rome
15:00 CET (UTC+01:00)	Negro 90'	Report	Amoruso (red card) 72'	Stadium: Stadio Olimpico; Attendance: 34,883; Referee: Gennaro Borriello

9 March 1997 23	Cagliari	0–0	Lazio	Cagliari
15:00 CET (UTC+01:00)		Report		Stadium: Stadio Sant'Elia; Attendance: 14,698; Referee: Stefano Farina

16 March 1997 24	Lazio	3–2	Atalanta	Rome
15:00 CET (UTC+01:00)	Mirković 36' (o.g.); Sottil 38' (o.g.); Buso 84'	Report	Lentini 53'; Morfeo 83'	Stadium: Stadio Olimpico; Attendance: 33,111; Referee: Alfredo Trentalange

23 March 1997 25	Vicenza	0–2	Lazio	Vicenza
15:00 CET (UTC+01:00)	Lopez (red card) 81'; Di Carlo (red card) 90+9'	Report	Nedvěd 19'; Fuser 90'; Buso (red card) 90+9'	Stadium: Stadio Romeo Menti; Attendance: 15,963; Referee: Cosimo Bolognino

6 April 1997 26	Lazio	2–0	Piacenza	Rome
15:00 CEST (UTC+02:00)	Signori 31' (pen.); Rambaudi 73'	Report		Stadium: Stadio Olimpico; Attendance: 33,535; Referee: Emilio Pellegrino

13 April 1997 27	Sampdoria	1–0	Lazio	Genoa
15:00 CEST (UTC+02:00)	Montella 67' (pen.); R. Mancini (penalty missed) 90'	Report		Stadium: Stadio Luigi Ferraris; Attendance: 24,383; Referee: Fiorenzo Treossi

20 April 1997 28	Lazio	6–1	Reggiana	Rome
15:00 CEST (UTC+02:00)	Signori 12' (pen.); Nedvěd 16', 86'; Protti 22', 32', 37'; Chamot (red card) 69'	Report	Simutenkov 42', (penalty missed) 69'	Stadium: Stadio Olimpico; Attendance: 32,633; Referee: Salvatore Racalbuto

4 May 1997 29	Roma	1–1	Lazio	Rome
15:00 CEST (UTC+02:00)	Balbo 35'	Report	Favalli (red card) 76'; Protti 90'	Stadium: Stadio Olimpico; Attendance: 73,409; Referee: Robert Boggi

11 May 1997 30	Lazio	4–1	Perugia	Rome
15:00 CEST (UTC+02:00)	Signori 7'; Rambaudi 45'; Casiraghi 48', 51'	Report	Gautieri (red card) 72'; Pizzi 86'	Stadium: Stadio Olimpico; Attendance: 34,089; Referee: Roberto Bettin

15 May 1997 31	Lazio	3–2	Napoli	Rome
20:30 CEST (UTC+02:00)	Casiraghi 24'; Nedvěd (yellow card) 31'; Fuser 39', 70'; Buso (yellow card) 90+2'	Report	Ayala 10', (yellow card) 42'; Pecchia (yellow card) 24'; Longo (yellow card) 28'; Beto 66'	Stadium: Stadio Olimpico; Attendance: 40,288; Referee: Stefano Farina

18 May 1997 32	Milan	2–2	Lazio	Milan
15:00 CEST (UTC+02:00)	Weah 41', 64'	Report	Boban 56' (o.g.); Fuser (red card) 73'; Nedvěd 86'	Stadium: San Siro; Attendance: 48,604; Referee: Pierluigi Pairetto

25 May 1997 33	Lazio	4–1	Verona	Rome
15:00 CEST (UTC+02:00)	Signori 4', 35'; Protti 23'; Rambaudi 74'	Report	Ametrano (yellow card) 30'; Maniero 33' (pen.)	Stadium: Stadio Olimpico; Attendance: 35,492; Referee: Marcello Nicchi

1 June 1997 34	Juventus	2–2	Lazio	Turin
15:00 CEST (UTC+02:00)	Vieri 31'; Amoruso 52'	Report	Casiraghi 73'; Protti 85'	Stadium: Stadio delle Alpi; Attendance: 38,617; Referee: Salvatore Racalbuto

=== Coppa Italia ===
==== Second round ====
28 August 1996	Avellino	0–1	Lazio	Avellino
			Casiraghi 26'	Stadium: Stadio Partenio-Adriano Lombardi; Referee: Piero Ceccarini

==== Round of 16 ====
23 October 1996	Verona	1–2	Lazio	Verona
	Orlandini 45'		Rambaudi 8'; Nedvěd 23'	Stadium: Stadio Marc'Antonio Bentegodi; Attendance: 9,136; Referee: Pierluigi Collina

==== Quarter-finals ====
14 November 1996 First leg	Napoli	1–0	Lazio	Naples
20:45 CET (UTC+01:00)	Aglietti 3'			Stadium: Stadio San Paolo; Attendance: 30,352; Referee: Alfredo Trentalange

27 November 1996 Second leg	Lazio	1–1 (1–2 agg.)	Napoli	Rome
	Casiraghi 8'; Nedvěd (red card) 86'		Caio 28'; Baldini (red card) 45'; Aglietti (red card) 48'	Stadium: Stadio Olimpico; Referee: Pierluigi Collina

=== UEFA Cup ===
==== First round ====
10 September 1996 First leg	Lens (France)	0–1	(Italy) Lazio	Lens, France
20:45 CEST (UTC+02:00)	Sikora (yellow card) 44'	Report	Favalli (yellow card) 27' (yellow-red card) 32'; Signori (yellow card) 32'; Nesta (yellow card) 80'; Chamot 85'	Stadium: Stade Bollaert-Delelis; Attendance: 18,174; Referee: John Rowbotham (Scotland)

24 September 1996 Second leg	Lazio (Italy)	1–1 (2–1 agg.)	(France) Lens	Rome, Italy
20:45 CEST (UTC+02:00)	Fuser 44'; Signori (yellow card) 74'; Chamot (yellow card) 89'	Report	Regis (yellow card) 44'; Sikora (yellow card) 63'; Šmicer 68'	Stadium: Stadio Olimpico; Attendance: 30,000; Referee: Gerd Grabher (Austria)

==== Second round ====
15 October 1996 First leg	Lazio (Italy)	1–0	(Spain) Tenerife	Rome, Italy
20:45 CEST (UTC+02:00)	Favalli (yellow card) 63'; Nedvěd 66'	Report		Stadium: Stadio Olimpico; Attendance: 18,000; Referee: Sándor Puhl (Hungary)

29 October 1996 Second leg	Tenerife (Spain)	5–3 (5–4 agg.)	(Italy) Lazio	Santa Cruz de Tenerife, Spain
21:30 CET (UTC+01:00)	Nesta 16' (o.g.); Paz (yellow card) 25'; Kodro 27'; Castaño 39', 62'; Jokanović 48'; Alexis (yellow card) 57'; Llorente (yellow card) 74'; Felipe Miñambres (yellow card) 83'	Report	Negro (yellow card) 14'; Nedvěd 14', (yellow card) 82'; Fuser 31'; Casiraghi 47', (yellow card) 61'; Signori (yellow card) 52'; Marcolin (yellow card) 89'	Stadium: Estadio Heliodoro Rodríguez López; Attendance: 21,000; Referee: Ilkka Koho (Finland)

== Statistics ==
=== Players statistics ===
No.	Pos	Nat	Player	Total		Serie A		Coppa		UEFA	
No.	Pos	Nat	Player	Apps	Goals	Apps	Goals	Apps	Goals	Apps	Goals
1	GK	(Italy) ITA	Marchegiani	40	-41	32	-32	4	-3	4	-6
2	DF	(Italy) ITA	Negro	34	3	25+2	3	3	0	4	0
6	DF	(Argentina) ARG	Chamot	34	1	28+1	0	2	0	3	1
13	DF	(Italy) ITA	Nesta	33	0	25	0	4	0	4	0
5	DF	(Italy) ITA	Favalli	31	0	26	0	3	0	2	0
14	MF	(Italy) ITA	Fuser	38	6	31	4	3	0	4	2
23	MF	(Italy) ITA	Venturin	16	0	13+3	0				
18	MF	(Czech Republic) CZE	Nedved	38	10	32	7	3	1	3	2
9	FW	(Italy) ITA	Casiraghi	31	11	22+2	8	4	2	3	1
11	FW	(Italy) ITA	Signori	39	15	30+2	15	4	0	3	0
7	FW	(Italy) ITA	Rambaudi	36	5	21+7	4	4	1	4	0
12	GK	(Italy) ITA	Orsi	3	-4	2+1	-4				
10	FW	(Italy) ITA	Protti	34	7	16+11	7	3	0	4	0
20	DF	(Italy) ITA	Grandoni	24	1	15+4	1	3	0	2	0
16	MF	(Australia) AUS	Okon	18	0	13+1	0	2	0	2	0
3	DF	(South Africa) RSA	Fish	17	1	11+4	1	2	0		
17	DF	(Switzerland) SUI	Gottardi	24	0	10+8	0	3	0	3	0
4	MF	(Italy) ITA	Marcolin	19	0	9+4	0	3	0	3	0
8	MF	(Italy) ITA	Buso	16	12	5+11	12	0			
15	MF	(Italy) ITA	Baronio	18	0	5+10	0	2	0	1	0
21	MF	(Italy) ITA	Piovanelli	16	0	3+8	0	2	0	3	0
22	GK	(Italy) ITA	Cudicini	1	-1	0+1	-1				
19	MF	(Italy) ITA	Franceschini	1	0	0+1	0				
28	FW	(Italy) ITA	Federici	0	0	0	0				
26	DF	(Italy) ITA	Di Lello	0	0	0	0				
27	MF	(Italy) ITA	Paniccia	0	0	0	0				
25	GK	(Italy) ITA	Cano	0	0	0	0				
24	MF	(Italy) ITA	Belle	0	0	0	0				

- Source: http://calcio-seriea.net/rose/1996/1107/
