= Francesco Guidolin =

Italian football player and manager (born 1955)

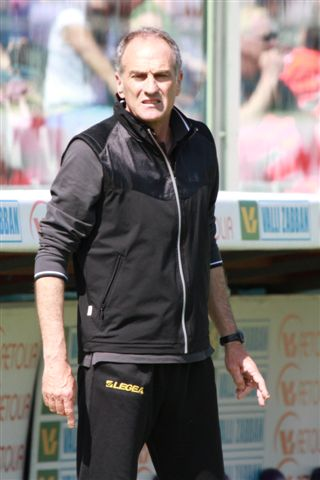
- Guidolin as Udinese manager in 2011

Personal information
- Full name: Francesco Guidolin
- Date of birth: 3 October 1955 (age 71)
- Place of birth: Castelfranco Veneto, Italy
- Position: Midfielder

Senior career*
Years	Team	Apps	(Gls)
1975–1984	Hellas Verona	102	(14)
1977–1978	→ Sambenedettese (loan)	35	(3)
1979–1980	→ Pistoiese (loan)	35	(5)
1982–1983	→ Bologna (loan)	24	(1)
1984–1986	Venezia	41	(1)
Total		237	(24)

International career
1976–1977	Italy U21	5	(0)

Managerial career
- 1986–1988: Giorgione (youth team)
- 1988–1989: Giorgione
- 1989–1990: Treviso
- 1990–1991: Fano
- 1991–1992: Empoli
- 1992–1993: Ravenna
- 1993: Atalanta
- 1994–1998: Vicenza
- 1998–1999: Udinese
- 1999–2003: Bologna
- 2004–2005: Palermo
- 2005: Genoa
- 2005–2006: Monaco
- 2006–2007: Palermo
- 2007: Palermo
- 2007–2008: Palermo
- 2008–2010: Parma
- 2010–2014: Udinese
- 2016: Swansea City
- * Club domestic league appearances and goals

Francesco Guidolin (Italian pronunciation: [franˈtʃesko ɡwidoˈlin]; born 3 October 1955) is an Italian football manager and former player. He has coached various Italian club sides in Serie A, winning the 1996–97 Coppa Italia with Vicenza, while also competing in European competitions with Vicenza, Udinese, Bologna and Palermo, as well as managing Ligue 1 club Monaco.

== Playing career ==
Guidolin made his professional debut in 1975 with the Serie A club Hellas Verona, with whom he spent the majority of his career, save for loan moves to clubs Sambenedettese, Pistoiese and Bologna. After spending two seasons with Serie C2 club Venezia, he retired in 1986.

Internationally, Guidolin played for the Italy national under-21 team between 1976 and 1977.

== Coaching career ==
=== Lower Italian leagues ===
Guidolin's managerial debut came in 1988 as head coach of Serie C2 team Giorgione, the main club of his native city, Castelfranco Veneto. Between 1989 and 1993, he then coached Treviso (Serie C2), Fano, Empoli and Ravenna, all in Serie C1.

=== Atalanta ===
Leading Ravenna to promotion to Serie B earned Guidolin a move to become head coach of Serie A club Atalanta on 1 July 1993, although he was sacked after just ten matches.

=== Vicenza ===
The next season, Guidolin joined Serie B side Vicenza and restored them following a period of decline. After gaining promotion to Serie A at the end of the 1994–95 Serie B, his club finished mid-table the following Serie A season. During the 1996–97 season, Vicenza led the league for a period, eventually achieving an eighth-place finish in Serie A, and won the 1997 Coppa Italia, defeating Napoli 3–1 on aggregate in the two-legged final. It was the club's first domestic trophy.

As a result, the following season Guidolin had his first European campaign (and Vicenza's second ever), reaching the 1997–98 UEFA Cup Winners' Cup semi-final before losing to eventual winners Chelsea. However, in the league season, Vicenza finished just one place above the relegation zone. The club was also defeated by Juventus in the 1997 Supercoppa Italiana.

=== Udinese ===
After managing Vicenza, Guidolin accepted the head coach position at Serie A side Udinese for the 1998–99 season. Their previous third-place finish had qualified them the first round of the 1998–99 UEFA Cup, but they did not progress beyond this stage, losing to Bayer Leverkusen. In the remaining league campaign, Guidolin was only able to guide them to a mid-table finish and was fired only days before the start of the following season.

=== Bologna ===
In the middle of the 1999–2000 season, Guidolin joined Serie A side Bologna, a former club as a player. Despite finishing ninth in the previous season, Bologna had qualified for the 1999–2000 UEFA Cup after winning a tie-breaker against Internazionale. Guidolin took them to the third round of the UEFA Cup, where they were eliminated by Galatasaray. In the Serie A season, they finished in 11th place. The following league campaign ended with another ninth-place finish, followed by another small improvement to seventh place and entry into in a summer tournament, the 2002 UEFA Intertoto Cup, where they were defeated in the three-game final stage by Fulham.

The 2002–03 season began with good results but ended in a disappointing 11th-place finish and resulted in heavy criticism of Guidolin, which became more intense after Guidolin was heard insulting the city of Bologna during a match.

=== Palermo ===
Guidolin returned to management with Palermo in January 2004, midway through the Serie B season. Playing Luca Toni as a lone striker among experienced players and those cast off from larger teams, he won the division, taking the Sicilians back to the top flight for the first time since 1973. In the subsequent Serie A campaign, he guided Palermo to a sixth-place finish, earning their first ever UEFA Cup qualification. However, he opted to leave the club at the end of the season.

=== Aborted move to Genoa ===
For the start of the next season, Guidolin had agreed to join Genoa, who had gained promotion to Serie A from the 2004–05 Serie B. However, after a match fixing scandal over their final league match was discovered, the Italian Football Federation instead placed Genoa last in Serie B, thereby relegating them to Serie C1. As a result, Guidolin rescinded his contract.

=== Monaco ===
In October 2005, Guidolin succeeded Didier Deschamps at Ligue 1 club Monaco. He signed a two-year contract in his first managerial post outside Italy. The club finished 10th in his only season.

=== Return to Palermo ===
On 30 May 2006, in a surprise move, Guidolin was re-hired by his former club Palermo. In his absence, they had reached the round of 16 in their inaugural UEFA Cup run, and had also qualified for the 2006–07 UEFA Cup despite finishing eighth in the league, due to Italian match fixing scandals costing other clubs their places. Guidolin's Serie A campaign started well, but after losing star player Amauri to injury in December, the team went over two months without a win. In the UEFA Cup, they progressed to the group stage but failed to qualify for the knockout stages, ending their campaign in December.

The season was also disrupted when the club was one of the two teams involved in the Sicilian derby of 2 February 2007 which led to riots and a police fatality, resulting in various safety restrictions being imposed on the league. Having dropped out of the UEFA Champions League qualification places, Guidolin was sacked on 23 April following a 4–3 home defeat to relegation-threatened Parma. After his assistant Renzo Gobbo failed to halt the club's slide, the sacking was revoked on 14 May after two further defeats. After finally finishing fifth and therefore qualifying for the 2007–08 UEFA Cup, Guidolin was sacked again, being replaced by Atalanta coach Stefano Colantuono.

In October 2007, Guidolin declined to take up an offer to coach struggling English Championship side Queens Park Rangers after failing to agree personal terms.

On 26 November 2007, with Palermo having been eliminated from the UEFA Cup in the first round and slipping to ninth place in Serie A, Guidolin was unexpectedly re-appointed by Palermo for a record fourth time, replacing Colantuono. After only gaining 18 points in 17 matches, he was sacked again on 24 March 2008 at the end of a run of three defeats, the latter followed by controversial criticism from him of the fans.

=== Parma ===
On 30 September 2008, Guidolin signed a contract with Serie B side Parma, guiding them to second place in the 2008–09 campaign, earning promotion back into the top flight. A good start to the following Serie A season saw the team constantly in the top ten for the first half, before finally ending mid-table. Despite the manner of his departure from Palermo, he is still today hailed as one of the club legends and was warmly welcomed during his return as Parma manager, albeit suffering a late defeat to his old side.

=== Return to Udinese ===
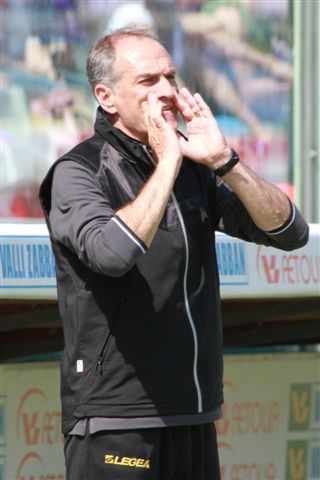
Guidolin managing Udinese in April 2011

After two seasons at Parma, Guidolin resigned in order to take up the head coach position at Serie A side Udinese for a second time, who despite having recent history of European football, had recently finished in 15th place, nine points and three places clear of the relegation zone.

After a poor start to the 2010–11 Serie A season, the team went on to record their highest points total in history and finished in fourth place, earning themselves a spot in the 2011–12 UEFA Champions League qualifying round on the final Serie A matchday. Guidolin kept his promise of "dancing like Boateng" if they qualified, and did a little jig in the middle of the pitch. Later that year, he was awarded the Panchina d'Oro as the best coach of the league.

In the next season, the club were unable to qualify for the Champions League proper after losing to Arsenal, but progressed as far as the round of 16 in the 2011–12 UEFA Europa League, being eliminated by Dutch side AZ. They finished the 2011–12 Serie A in third place, the best result in the club's history, equalling Alberto Zaccheroni's 1996–97 season, again achieving a place in the qualifying round for the 2012–13 UEFA Champions League. In his third season at Udinese, Guidolin again failed to reach the Champions League proper, losing on penalties to Braga, but this time also finished bottom of their group in the 2012–13 UEFA Europa League. In the Serie A table, the club finished fifth, reaching the Europa League qualifying round for a third time.

During the 2013–14 season, Guidolin's Udinese reached the semi-finals of the Coppa Italia, but were eliminated by Fiorentina.

==== Pozzo family consultant ====
On 20 May 2014, Guidolin took the decision to leave coaching, but maintained a link with Udinese by becoming the technical supervisor for the club's chairman Giampaolo Pozzo, thereby also overseeing his two other clubs, Spanish side Granada and English team Watford.

=== Swansea City ===
On 18 January 2016, Guidolin was named head coach of Swansea City, at that point struggling in the 2015–16 Premier League, only two points above the relegation zone, to work alongside interim manager Alan Curtis, who took the post of first team coach. While the decision baffled some pundits, the Swansea chairman argued that Guidolin's achievements at Udinese on a relatively small budget were similar to what the club was trying to achieve. At the time of his appointment, Guidolin was virtually unknown to the English game and club captain Ashley Williams later admitted that he had to "Google" his new manager.

Guidolin took charge of his first game on 24 January 2016, an away fixture at Goodison Park which Swansea City won 2–1, recording the club's first-ever league win over Everton. On 1 May, Guidolin mathematically secured Swansea's place in the Premier League for the following season, as the club defeated Liverpool 3–1 at Liberty Stadium. On 11 May 2016, and despite intense speculation and betting that former manager Brendan Rodgers would replace him, Guidolin was invited to sign a new two-year-contract with Swansea after impressing the club's board of directors with his achievements in the late winter and spring of the 2015–16 season.

After a poor start in the Premier League the following season, Guidolin was sacked on 3 October 2016, his 61st birthday, and replaced with immediate effect by former United States national team manager Bob Bradley.

== Later years ==
After his short-lived experience at Swansea, Guidolin moved out of management for good. Since 2018, he is working with DAZN as a football pundit and color commentator.

== Style of management ==
Having won the Panchina d'oro award in 2011, Guidolin was considered one of the best Italian and Serie A coaches of his generation. He was initially known for using a Sacchi-inspired 4–4–2 formation (or its variant, the 4–4–1–1) towards the beginning of his coaching career. Later, he became known for his versatility and tactical prowess, as well as his ability to adopt systems which were most suitable to his players. He has also made use of 4–3–2–1, 3–4–1–2, 4–3–3, 4–5–1, 3–4–3 (or 3–4–2–1), 3–1–4–1–1, or 3–5–2 (or 3–5–1–1) formations throughout his career. Giovanni Cornacchini, who played under Guidolin at Vicenza, described him as the best coach he ever had, and as the manager who was the most prepared on the pitch.

At Vicenza, Guidolin used several systems, but predominantly fielded a fluid 4–4–2 formation with overlapping full-backs, and switches of play to utilise the width of the pitch. His wingers were not only required to beat opponents in one on one situations and cross from the touchline, but also cut inside and shoot on goal. He favoured a more defensive approach at the club, and a gameplay in which his players often played the ball first-time, taking few touches when attacking. His team would occasionally bypass the midfield, with the defenders, or the defensive midfielder Domenico Di Carlo, who would often drop deep, playing long balls to look for centre-forward Pasquale Luiso. Second striker Lamberto Zauli would often play in a more withdrawn central role, dropping deeper into midfield to help give his team an extra player in the middle of the pitch; in this role, he could create chances for Luiso, create space with his movement, or make runs from deep with or without the ball. As such, the team's set-up appeared to be a 4–4–1–1 at times, or even a 4–5–1 when defending. Balance was also an important part of his system; as such he complemented the attacking play of winger Gabriele Ambrosetti with the use of a defensive full-back Lorenzo Stovini, who would cover for the former. Guidolin also utilised his players' versatility (such as Gustavo Méndez, Zauli, Davide Belotti, and Massimo Beghetto), deploying them in different positions throughout the course of the season, depending on their opponent. When playing off the ball, Guidolin employed the use of heavy, aggressive pressing, like his main influence Sacchi; however, he did not imitate Sacchi's use of the offside trap, preferring a deeper zona mista or gioco all'Italiana system defensively, which was a cross between man-to-man marking strategies – such as Italian catenaccio – and zonal marking systems – such as the Dutch total football.

During his time as head coach of Udinese, Guidolin was instead known for playing an aggressive, and attractive attacking style of football, primarily based on possession; however, his team were also capable of creating chances and scoring from counter-attacks with few touches. Despite being fast–paced, physical, and attacking-minded in their approach, his team were also known for their defensive solidity and flexibility (adopting several different formations, including the 3–4–1–2, 3–4–3, 3–4–2–1, 3–5–2, and 3–5–1–1), as well as their effective use of wing-backs Mauricio Isla and Pablo Armero, the attacking play of Antonio Di Natale and Alexis Sánchez, and Gökhan Inler as a deep-lying playmaker, dictating play in midfield. Udinese's performances and gameplay under his tenure drew praise in the media, and earned his side comparisons with Pep Guardiola's Barcelona.

At Swansea, Guidolin also maintained an energetic, free–flowing approach based on ball possession and passing, in a similar manner to that used by several of his predecessors at the club, Roberto Martínez, Brendan Rodgers, and Michael Laudrup.

== Managerial statistics ==
As of 3 October 2016

Managerial record by team and tenure
Team	From	To	Record					Ref
Team	From	To	G	W	D	L	Win %	Ref
Giorgione	1 November 1988	7 June 1989	28	5	10	13	17.86	
Treviso	7 June 1989	10 June 1990	40	14	11	15	35.00	
Fano	10 June 1990	1 July 1991	40	13	16	11	32.50	
Empoli	1 July 1991	1 July 1992	40	12	21	7	30.00	
Ravenna	1 July 1992	1 July 1993	44	24	15	5	54.55	
Atalanta	1 July 1993	2 November 1993	12	4	2	6	33.33	
Vicenza	1 July 1994	1 July 1998	165	65	52	48	39.39	
Udinese	1 July 1998	1 July 1999	44	19	11	14	43.18	
Bologna	30 October 1999	22 June 2003	148	49	44	55	33.11	
Palermo	26 January 2004	1 July 2005	64	24	25	15	37.50	
Genoa	1 July 2005	31 July 2005	0	0	0	0	—	
Monaco	4 October 2005	29 May 2006	40	16	12	12	40.00	
Palermo	29 May 2006	23 April 2007	41	16	11	14	39.02	
Palermo	15 May 2007	7 June 2007	2	2	0	0	100.00	
Palermo	26 November 2007	24 March 2008	19	5	4	10	26.32	
Parma	30 September 2008	24 May 2010	75	32	26	17	42.67	
Udinese	24 May 2010	20 May 2014	185	80	45	60	43.24	
Swansea City	18 January 2016	3 October 2016	25	9	5	11	36.00	
Total			1,012	389	310	313	38.44	

== Honours ==
=== Manager ===
Ravenna

- Serie C1: 1992–93

Vicenza

- Coppa Italia: 1996–97

Palermo

- Serie B: 2003–04

=== Individual ===
- Panchina d'Oro: 2011

== See also ==
- List of football managers with the most matches
