= Beghetto =

Beghetto is an Italian surname. Notable people with the surname include:

- Andrea Beghetto (born 1994), Italian footballer
- Giuseppe Beghetto (born 1939), Italian cyclist
- Luigi Beghetto (born 1973), Italian footballer
- Massimo Beghetto (born 1968), Italian footballer and manager
