= Raul Otero =

Uruguayan footballer (born 1970)

Personal information
- Full name: Raul Omar Otero Larzábal
- Date of birth: 15 January 1970 (age 56)
- Place of birth: Montevideo, Uruguay
- Height: 1.78 m (5 ft 10 in)
- Position: Midfielder

Senior career*
| Years | Team | Apps | (Gls) |
| 1992–1995 | River Plate Montevideo | | |
| 1996 | Consadole Sapporo | | |
| 1997 | C.A. Cerro | 17 | (12) |
| 1998 | River Plate Montevideo | 5 | (1) |
| 1998–2000 | Danubio F.C. | 53 | (3) |
| 2000–2001 | Olimpia Asunción | 20 | (1) |
| 2001–2003 | C.A. Cerro | 51 | (0) |
| 2004 | C.A. Bella Vista | 19 | (0) |
| 2005 | Uruguay Montevideo | | |

International career
| 1994–1995 | Uruguay | 9 | (0) |
- * Club domestic league appearances and goals

Raul Omar Otero Larzábal (born 15 January 1970 in Montevideo, Uruguay) is a Uruguayan retired footballer who played as a midfielder. He is the older brother of the former striker Marcelo Otero.

== International career ==
Otero made his senior debut for the Uruguay national football team on 19 October 1994 in a friendly match against Peru (0–1 win) in the Estadio Nacional José Díaz in Lima, Peru. His brother Marcelo also earned his first international cap in the same game.
