= Fabio Viviani (footballer) =

Italian footballer and manager

Personal information
- Date of birth: 29 September 1966 (age 60)
- Place of birth: Lucca, Italy
- Height: 1.79 m (5 ft 10 in)
- Position: Midfielder

Senior career*
Years	Team	Apps	(Gls)
1984–1988	Como	22	(1)
1985–1987	→ Ospitaletto (loan)	35	(2)
1988–1989	Milan	6	(0)
1989–1992	Monza	51	(2)
1992–2000	Vicenza	243	(13)
2001	Treviso	9	(0)

Managerial career
- 2001–2002: Vicenza
- 2009–2010: Sambonifacese
- 2010: Portosummaga
- 2011–2012: Grosseto
- 2016: Palermo (caretaker)
- 2016: Kalba
- 2018–2019: Kalba
- 2020: Fujairah
- 2023–2024: Hatta
- * Club domestic league appearances and goals

Fabio Viviani (born 29 September 1966) is an Italian professional football coach and former player, who played as a midfielder.

== Playing career ==
Viviani was born in Lucca. He played for seven seasons (145 games, 3 goals) in the Serie A for Calcio Como, A.C. Milan and, most notably, Vicenza Calcio.

After winning the 1996–97 Coppa Italia, he reached the semi-final of the 1997–98 UEFA Cup Winners' Cup with Vicenza Calcio.

== Style of play ==
Viviani was a versatile and technically gifted midfielder, who possessed good vision. Although primarily a central midfielder, he was also capable of playing in several other roles; during his time at Vicenza, he was used as an attacking midfielder or second striker, as a central defender, and as a left-back under manager Francesco Guidolin.

== Coaching career ==
After retiring from his career as a footballer, Viviani stayed at Vicenza as part of the coaching staff, serving as caretaker during the 2001–02 season alongside Adelio Moro, and then as youth coach until 2005. He successively left Vicenza in order to follow his mentor Edoardo Reja at Napoli, working alongside him as assistant coach. During the 2009–10 season he then served as head coach of Lega Pro Seconda Divisione club Sambonifacese. In July 2010 he was called to replace Eugenio Corini at Serie B club Portosummaga, being however removed from his managerial duties on 29 November 2010 due to poor results.

On 5 December 2011, he was unveiled as new head coach of Grosseto, until 1 February 2012 when he was sacked.

On 9 October 2014, he was hired by Serie A club Palermo as Giuseppe Iachini's new technical collaborator.

On 10 February 2020, he was appointed as the new coach of Fujairah. He left when his contract expired in summer of the same year.

== Honours ==
Milan

- European Cup: 1988–89

Vicenza

- Coppa Italia: 1996–97
