= Gabriele Ambrosetti =

Italian footballer and manager

Personal information
- Full name: Gabriele Ambrosetti
- Date of birth: 7 August 1973 (age 53)
- Place of birth: Varese, Italy
- Height: 1.78 m (5 ft 10 in)
- Position: Midfielder

Senior career*
Years	Team	Apps	(Gls)
1990–1993	Varese	50	(11)
1993–1994	Brescia	34	(10)
1994–1995	→ Venezia (loan)	18	(3)
1995–1996	→ Vicenza (loan)	24	(3)
1996	Brescia	9	(2)
1996–1999	Vicenza	79	(15)
1999–2003	Chelsea	16	(0)
2000–2001	→ Piacenza (loan)	14	(1)
2001	→ Vicenza (loan)	11	(1)
2001–2002	→ Piacenza (loan)	14	(0)
2003–2004	Piacenza	28	(1)
2004–2006	Pro Patria	41	(1)
Total		338	(48)

Managerial career
- 2016: Swansea City (Assistant)
- * Club domestic league appearances and goals

Gabriele Ambrosetti (born 7 August 1973) is an Italian football manager and former player, who played as a winger.

== Playing career ==
Born in Varese, Ambrosetti made his professional debut with his hometown club, and later played for several Italian sides, including Brescia, Venezia, and Vicenza. He won the 1996–97 Coppa Italia at Vicenza, defeating Napoli 3–1 on aggregate in the final, and in April 1998 played in a Cup Winners Cup semi-final against Chelsea, where his performances inspired the English Premier League club to sign him for £3.5 million in August 1999. He arrived as, according to his manager, Gianluca Vialli, the 'Italian Ryan Giggs', but struggled to live up to the tag and in four years made only a handful of appearances. He made his Chelsea debut as a substitute on 21 August in a 1–0 home win against Aston Villa, replacing compatriot Gianfranco Zola for the last three minutes. The only goal he scored for Chelsea was in a 5–0 win against Galatasaray in Istanbul, on 20 October 1999 during the UEFA Champions League Group Stage. Ambrosetti also contributed one appearance to Chelsea's victorious 1999–2000 FA Cup campaign. He spent his final seasons with Piacenza and Pro Patria, before retiring.

== Style of play ==
Capable of playing both as a forward and as a midfielder, Ambrosetti was noted for his pace, ability to get past players, and his powerful and accurate shot from distance.

== Coaching career ==
In January 2016 Ambrosetti joined the coaching staff of Swansea City under their newly appointed manager Francesco Guidolin, who had previously coached Ambrosetti at Vicenza. When Guidolin was sacked, Ambrosetti also left the club.

== Honours ==
Brescia

- Anglo-Italian Cup: 1993–94

Vicenza

- Coppa Italia: 1996–97

Chelsea

- FA Cup: 1999–2000
- FA Community Shield: 2000
