= Carlo Cudicini =

Italian footballer (born 1973)

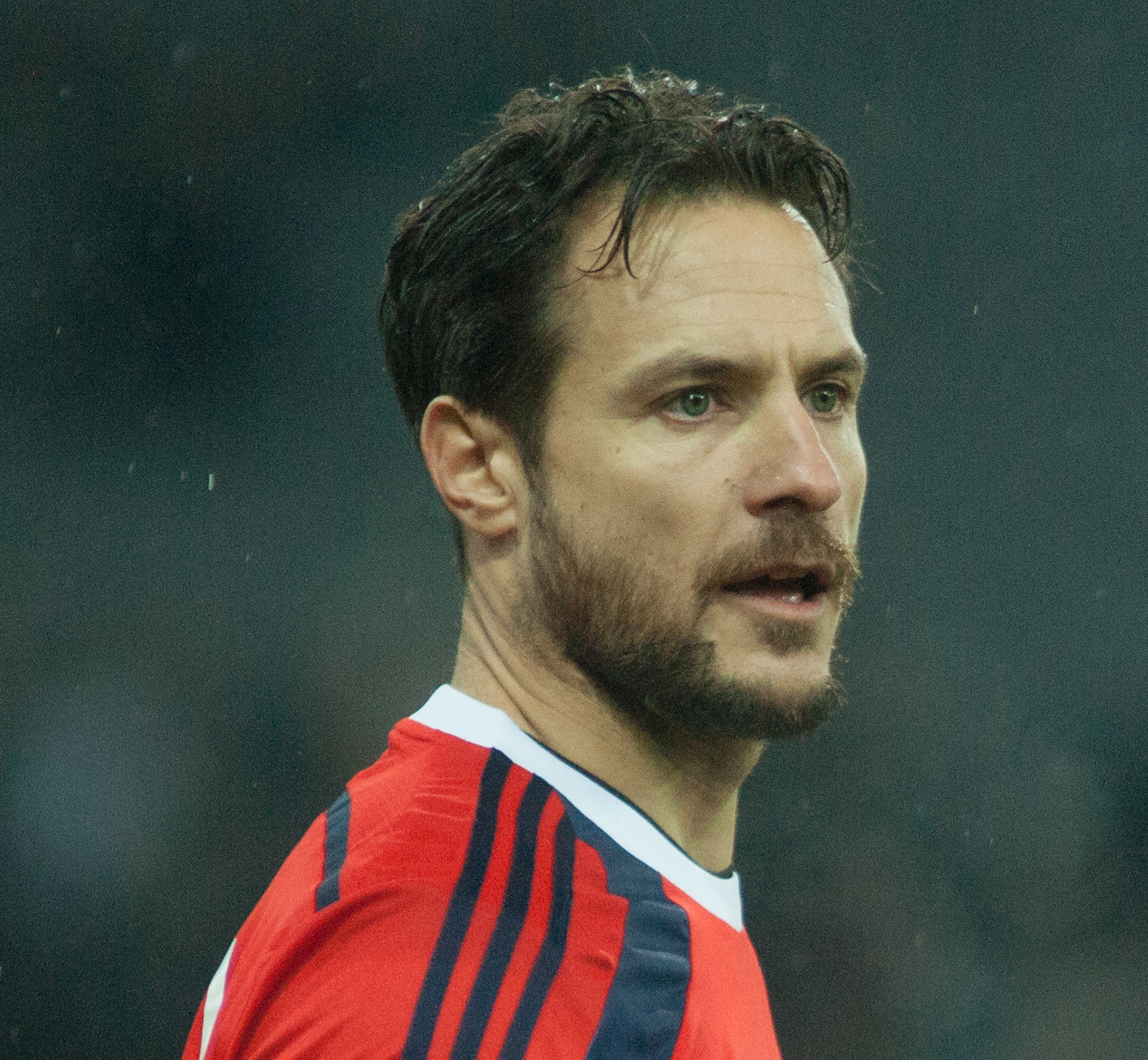
- Cudicini in 2014

Personal information
- Full name: Carlo Cudicini
- Date of birth: 6 September 1973 (age 53)
- Place of birth: Milan, Italy
- Height: 1.85 m (6 ft 1 in)
- Position: Goalkeeper

Team information
- Current team: Chelsea (loan player technical coach)

Senior career*
Years	Team	Apps	(Gls)
1992–1995	AC Milan	0	(0)
1993–1994	→ Como (loan)	6	(0)
1995–1996	Prato	30	(0)
1996–1997	Lazio	1	(0)
1997–2000	Castel di Sangro	46	(0)
1999–2000	→ Chelsea (loan)	1	(0)
2000–2009	Chelsea	141	(0)
2009–2012	Tottenham Hotspur	19	(0)
2013	LA Galaxy	21	(0)
Total		265	(0)

International career
1990–1992	Italy U18	20	(0)
1992–1993	Italy U21	1	(0)
- * Club domestic league appearances and goals

Carlo Cudicini (born 6 September 1973) is an Italian professional football coach and former player who played as a goalkeeper. He is currently loan player technical coach at Premier League club Chelsea, where he also serves as a club ambassador.

He is the son of AC Milan goalkeeper Fabio Cudicini, and the grandson of Ponziana defender Guglielmo Cudicini. Cudicini started his professional career at Serie A side AC Milan in 1992, but struggled to break into the first team and was loaned to Como before moving to Prato and then Lazio in 1996. Having only made a single league appearance for Lazio, he moved a year later to Castel di Sangro and then to Premier League side Chelsea in 1999, initially on loan.

At Chelsea, he dislodged Ed de Goey from the number one spot and was voted Chelsea's Player of the Year for the 2001–02 season, remaining first choice until the signing of Petr Čech in 2004. Cudicini left Chelsea in January 2009, having made 141 league appearances for the club, and joined local rivals Tottenham Hotspur. At Tottenham, he was not first choice, and only made 19 league appearances for the club. In 2013, he signed for Los Angeles Galaxy of Major League Soccer, where he played the final season of his career.

Cudicini played 20 times for the Italy under-18 team between 1990 and 1992, and made a single appearance for the under-21 team, but never played for the senior team. In 2003, during his successful period at Chelsea, The Football Association attempted to select him for the England national team, but he was ineligible.

== Club career ==
=== Early career ===
Cudicini made only two appearances for AC Milan (1992–95) in the Champions League, one in the Coppa Italia and none in Serie A during that period in the club's history. He featured on the bench in the 1993 Champions League final against Marseille. He was loaned to Como for a season in 1993–94, and was subsequently transferred to Prato in 1995, and then to Lazio in 1996 where he suffered a serious wrist injury, and consequently only made one senior appearance. He then moved to Castel di Sangro in 1997, where his injury problems persisted.

=== Chelsea ===
==== 1999–2004 ====
Cudicini joined Chelsea on loan in 1999, with the deal being made permanent for £160,000 a year later. He made his Chelsea debut on 25 August 1999 in a goalless draw away to Skonto Riga of Latvia in the UEFA Champions League, with the London-based club winning 3–0 on aggregate and advancing into the group stage of the competition for the first time; he came on as a substitute for Ed de Goey with 12 minutes remaining. On 13 October he played for the first time at Stamford Bridge in the third round of the League Cup, a 1–0 loss to second-tier Huddersfield Town. De Goey was rested after 58 consecutive games and Cudicini made his Premier League debut for the final game of the season, a 4–0 home win over Derby County on 14 May 2000; Six days later in the 2000 FA Cup final, he was on the bench as the Dutchman returned for the 1–0 win over Aston Villa.

Cudicini played three games in all competitions in his first season at Chelsea. The following season, he started to appear more regularly and shared the starting spot with De Goey (Cudicini started 23 league games, De Goey 15). He was voted Chelsea's Player of the Year for the 2001–02 season by fans. In December 2001, he saved two penalties in a span of seven days from Sunderland's Kevin Phillips and Liverpool's Gary McAllister.

Cudicini was recognised as the best goalkeeper in the Premier League in the 2002–03 season, when he won the ITV Premiership Goalkeeper of the Season award. Cudicini also saved a penalty from Arsenal's Thierry Henry to help earn his side a replay in the FA Cup.

On 8 May 2004, Cudicini saved a penalty from Manchester United's Ruud van Nistelrooy, before making a mistake and allowing the same player to equalise. The game ended 1–1, enough for automatic UEFA Champions League qualification.

==== 2004–06 ====
The 2004–05 season saw the arrival of new manager José Mourinho and new goalkeeper Petr Čech. Cudicini missed out on a Premier League winners' medal as he managed only three league appearances all season, all of which came after Chelsea had secured the trophy. He did, however, feature in most of Chelsea's FA Cup and League Cup games that season. Chelsea reached the 2005 Football League Cup final, however Cudicini was suspended as he had been sent off in an FA Cup tie the week before against Newcastle United. This meant that Čech started and Lenny Pidgeley was on the bench.

Cudicini again was second choice to Čech, and managed only four league appearances as Chelsea won the Premier League for a consecutive season. In January 2006, having played 16 out of 90 fixtures since the signing of Čech, and only five times that season, he signed a new contract lasting until 2009. At the time of signing the contract, he had saved half of the 12 penalties he had faced.

==== 2006–07 ====
On 14 October 2006, in a league game against Reading, he was knocked unconscious and had to be stretchered off the pitch while wearing an oxygen mask after coming on as a substitute for first-choice goalkeeper Čech. Čech was believed to be sidelined for up to a year, leaving Cudicini as the most senior goalkeeper available at Chelsea. However, even though he had fully recovered and returned to training, Cudicini faced a battle to dislodge third-choice goalkeeper Henrique Hilário, who had been playing well in Čech's and Cudicini's absence. After Hilário conceded four goals in two matches, Chelsea manager José Mourinho decided to put Cudicini in goal against Aston Villa in their fourth-round match of the League Cup. Chelsea won that match 4–0 and Cudicini took over goalkeeping duties from Hilário.

However, after returning to action in Chelsea's 2–0 defeat to Liverpool at Anfield in late January 2007, Čech kept both Cudicini and Hilário out of the first team. Cudicini's lack of action for Chelsea since 2004 and his reluctance to move to a new club saw him described as "the world's most unambitious footballer" by The Daily Telegraph in 2008. Cudicini was on the bench as Chelsea won the 2007 FA Cup final, but Hilario was preferred as the substitute goalkeeper as they won the 2007 Football League Cup final.

==== 2007–09 ====
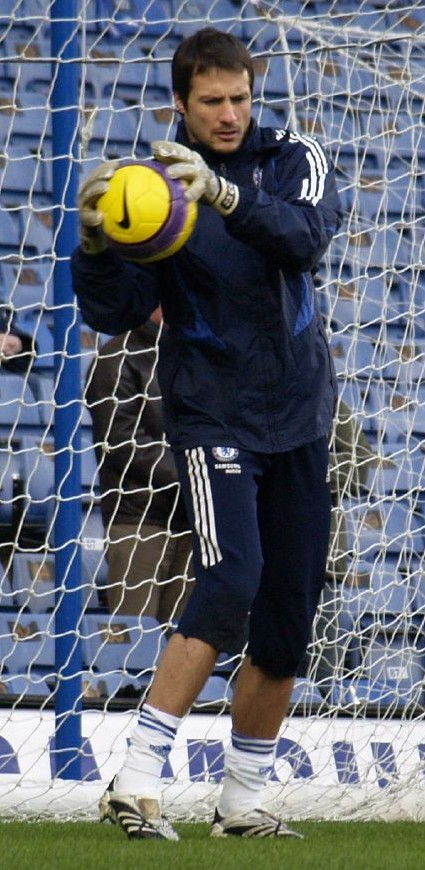
Cudicini warming up with Chelsea in 2008

Cudicini began the new campaign once again as second-choice to Čech, but a string of injuries to the latter saw Cudicini feature 19 times in all competitions. His first appearance of the season was in a League Cup game against Hull City in which he kept a clean sheet in a 4–0 win. He played against Leicester City in a 4–3 win at Stamford Bridge in the next round before making his first appearance of the season in the Champions League, coming on as a substitute against Schalke 04. Cudicini then featured in the next five games due to Čech's injury, conceding just one goal in the process, against Everton at Stamford Bridge in a 1–1 draw. However, Cudicini suffered an injury and would not be seen between the posts until February in a FA Cup game against Huddersfield Town.

Cudicini also featured in the next round of the cup, but Chelsea lost 1–0 to Barnsley and were knocked out of the competition. Cudicini retained his place due to another injury suffered by Čech and featured in Chelsea's 6–1 win over Derby County. He kept clean sheets in 1–0 wins against Sunderland and Middlesbrough, as well as a 2–0 away win at Manchester City and played in Chelsea's 2–1 win over local rivals Arsenal in March. He featured in both legs against Turkish club Fenerbahçe as Chelsea progressed 3–2 on aggregate; he was taken off with an injury that effectively ended his season. Cudicini made his 200th appearance for the club in all competitions against West Ham United on 1 December 2007. He was an unused substitute as Chelsea lost both the 2008 Football League Cup final and the 2008 UEFA Champions League final.

Cudicini made his first Premier League appearance of the following season in Chelsea's 5–0 win at Middlesbrough and this marked his 100th clean sheet in a Chelsea shirt. He played his last game for Chelsea at home in the FA Cup third round tie with Southend United which ended in a 1–1 draw.

=== Tottenham Hotspur ===
On 26 January 2009, it was confirmed that Cudicini signed for Tottenham Hotspur on a free transfer. He was allowed to move on a free due to his services given to Chelsea. He made his debut the next day in the Premier League fixture against Stoke City, a 3–1 win. Following Tottenham's loss in the 2009 League Cup final against Manchester United (for which Cudicini was cup-tied), Cudicini's appearances were limited. His last game for Spurs in the 2008–09 season was the 1–2 victory over Hull City at the KC Stadium the week prior.

Cudicini made his first competitive appearance in nearly six months for Tottenham when he came on as a substitute for the injured Heurelho Gomes in a 5–1 victory over Hull City on 19 August 2009. He played a number of matches, including a 3–0 defeat at his former club Chelsea on 20 September which saw him return to Stamford Bridge for the first time since leaving the club. He was then benched in favour of the returning Gomes for the match against Portsmouth at Fratton Park.

On 12 November, Cudicini was involved in a serious motorcycle accident in Walthamstow, east London, on his way to Tottenham's training ground. It was reported that he had fractured both his wrists and injured his pelvis. He was taken to an east London hospital, then later was transferred to a private hospital. In late February, the Tottenham Hotspur website reported that Cudicini had started some ball work.

On 12 May, Cudicini signed a new one-year contract with Spurs. On 10 July, Cudicini played 45 minutes in a pre-season friendly against Bournemouth, his first action since his accident.

On 25 August 2010, Cudicini saw his first official action for the club in nearly a year as a half-time replacement for the injured Gomes in the second leg of Tottenham's UEFA Champions League play-off round tie against Young Boys of Switzerland. He was an eighth-minute replacement for Luka Modrić after Gomes' sending-off against Inter Milan on 20 October, in a 4–3 loss to the reigning European champions at the San Siro. He went on to play in the return match on 2 November at White Hart Lane as Spurs earned a 3–1 victory.

Following the signing of Brad Friedel from Aston Villa on a free transfer, Cudicini again continued to act as back-up goalkeeper with previous first-choice goalkeeper Heurelho Gomes relegated to third-choice. Cudicini was, however, used as first choice goalkeeper during Tottenham's Europa League matches, making his first start of the season against PAOK in a 0–0 draw. During the match, Cudicini let in an Alves Lino penalty, but Lino was asked to retake the penalty and subsequently missed. Cudicini also played in the 2012 FA Cup semi-final against former club Chelsea.

Cudicini started the season second choice to Friedel, but after the addition of Hugo Lloris to the squad, Cudicini was limited to the role as the back-up goalkeeper in Tottenham's Europa League campaign. His final appearance for the club was in a 0–3 win against Carlisle United at Brunton Park in a third round League Cup tie on 26 September 2012.

=== LA Galaxy ===
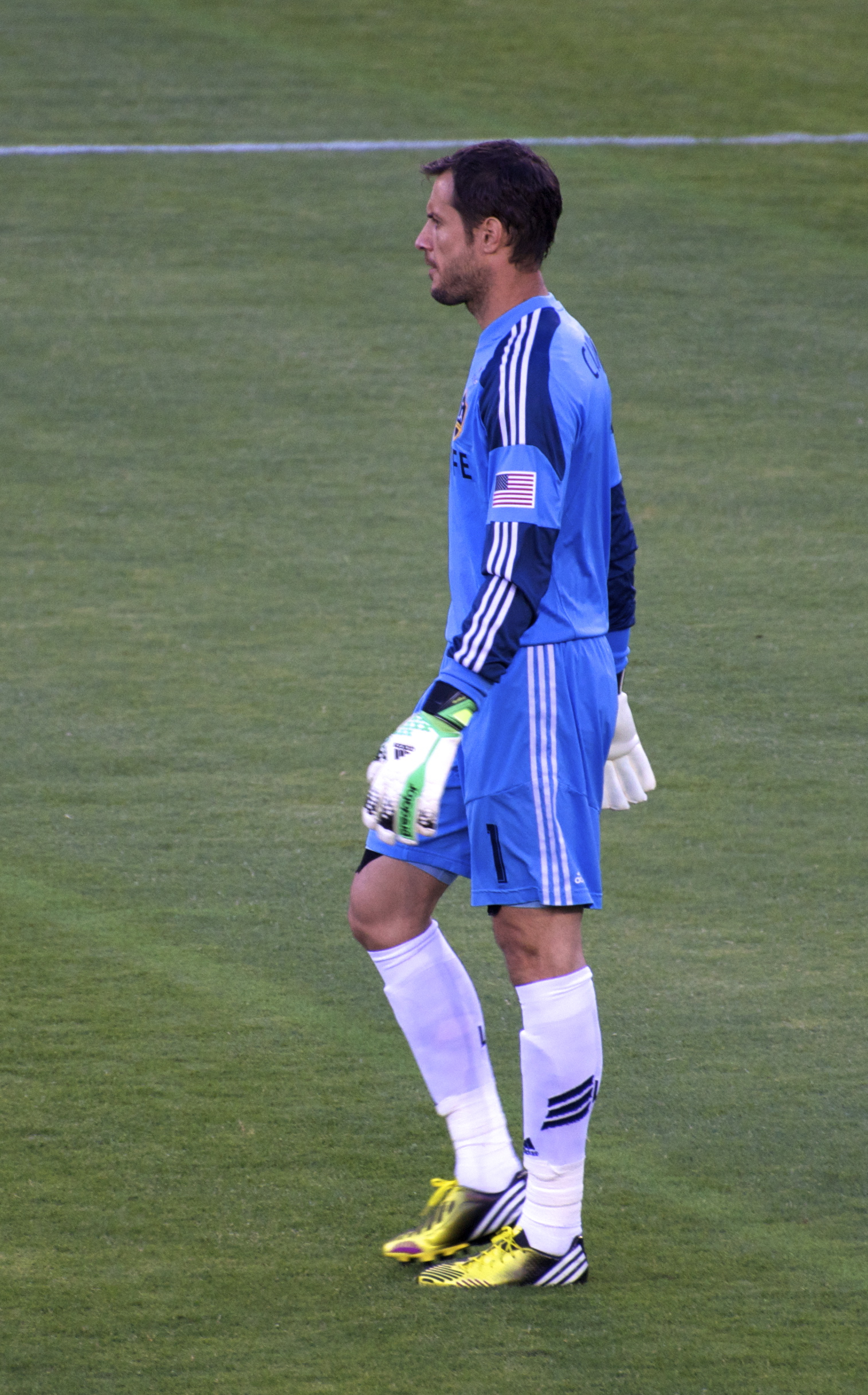
Playing for the LA Galaxy in 2013

Cudicini was transferred to the LA Galaxy of Major League Soccer (MLS) on 31 December 2012 on a free transfer. He made his debut in a 4–0 win over Chicago Fire.

Cudicini was released by the Galaxy on 26 January 2014.

== International career ==
Cudicini was capped at under-18 and under-21 level, but never represented his country of birth at senior level. He was called into the squad for the 2002 friendly against Turkey, but was not named in the matchday squad by Giovanni Trapattoni, behind Gianluigi Buffon and Francesco Toldo.

The FA have previously claimed he could be eligible to represent England, however, similar to the case of Mikel Arteta, he was not. He was not eligible for England because FIFA Statutes stipulate that the player needs to have held a British passport at the time when he represented Italy at the U16 European Championship, and would have required five years of education in Britain before turning 18.

== Style of play ==
Cudicini was large, quick, agile and athletic keeper, Cudicini was regarded as a notable goalkeeper in the Premier League, for Chelsea and for Italy. He came to prominence in his late 20s.

== Coaching career ==
In March 2015, Cudicini joined the Republic of Ireland national under-21 football team coaching staff as goalkeeping coach.

In July 2016, Cudicini returned to Chelsea to become a club ambassador and assistant to the new first-team head coach Antonio Conte. He was present amongst the rest of the coaching staff during Chelsea's 2–1 home win over West Ham in their first match of the 2016–17 season. He continued the job under Maurizio Sarri in 2018–19 season.

In August 2019, Cudicini had been appointed technical coach for the players on loan from other clubs, following Eddie Newton's move to Frank Lampard's backroom staff.

In December 2022, Cudicini received his UEFA Pro License in Dublin after attending the FAI Coach Education Department course.

== Career statistics ==
=== Club ===
Appearances and goals by club, season and competition
Club	Season	League			National Cup (Note: Includes Coppa Italia and FA Cup)		League Cup (Note: Includes Football League Cup)		Continental		Other		Total	
Club	Season	Division	Apps	Goals	Apps	Goals	Apps	Goals	Apps	Goals	Apps	Goals	Apps	Goals
AC Milan	1991–92	Serie A	0	0	—		—		—		—		0	0
AC Milan	1992–93	Serie A	0	0	1	0	—		2 (Note: Appearance(s) in UEFA Champions League)	0	—		3	0
AC Milan	Total		0	0	1	0	—		2	0	—		3	0
Como (loan)	1993–94	Serie C1	6	0	1	0	—		—		—		7	0
Prato	1995–96	Serie C1	30	0	0	0	—		—		—		30	0
Lazio	1996–97	Serie A	1	0	0	0	—		—		—		1	0
Castel di Sangro	1997–98	Serie B	14	0	2	0	—		—		—		16	0
Castel di Sangro	1998–99	Serie C1	32	0	6	0	—		—		—		38	0
Castel di Sangro	Total		46	0	8	0	—		—		—		54	0
Chelsea (loan)	1999–2000	Premier League	1	0	0	0	1	0	1	0	—		3	0
Chelsea	2000–01	Premier League	24	0	3	0	0	0	2 (Note: Appearance(s) in UEFA Cup)	0	0	0	29	0
Chelsea	2001–02	Premier League	28	0	8	0	5	0	0	0	—		41	0
Chelsea	2002–03	Premier League	36	0	5	0	3	0	2	0	—		46	0
Chelsea	2003–04	Premier League	26	0	3	0	0	0	11	0	—		40	0
Chelsea	2004–05	Premier League	3	0	3	0	4	0	1	0	—		11	0
Chelsea	2005–06	Premier League	4	0	6	0	1	0	1	0	—		12	0
Chelsea	2006–07	Premier League	8	0	0	0	1	0	1	0	1 (Note: Appearance in FA Community Shield)	0	11	0
Chelsea	2007–08	Premier League	10	0	2	0	2	0	5	0	0	0	19	0
Chelsea	2008–09	Premier League	2	0	1	0	1	0	0	0	—		4	0
Chelsea	Total		142	0	31	0	18	0	24	0	1	0	216	0
Tottenham Hotspur	2008–09	Premier League	4	0	0	0	0	0	—		—		4	0
Tottenham Hotspur	2009–10	Premier League	7	0	0	0	1	0	—		—		8	0
Tottenham Hotspur	2010–11	Premier League	8	0	0	0	1	0	4	0	—		13	0
Tottenham Hotspur	2011–12	Premier League	0	0	6	0	0	0	5 (Note: Appearance(s) in UEFA Europa League)	0	—		11	0
Tottenham Hotspur	2012–13	Premier League	0	0	0	0	1	0	0	0	—		1	0
Tottenham Hotspur	Total		19	0	6	0	3	0	9	0	—		37	0
LA Galaxy	2013	Major League Soccer	21	0	0	0	—		4 (Note: Appearance(s) in CONCACAF Champions League)	0	—		25	0
Career total			265	0	47	0	21	0	39	0	1	0	373	0

== Honours ==
AC Milan

- Serie A: 1992–93
- UEFA Champions League runner-up: 1992–93

Chelsea

- FA Cup: 1999–2000, 2006–07; runner-up: 2001–02
- Football League Cup: 2004–05, 2006–07; runner-up: 2007–08
- FA Charity Shield/FA Community Shield: 2000, 2005

Individual

- Chelsea Player of the Year: 2001–02
