= Roberto Murgita =

Italian footballer (born 1968)

Personal information
- Date of birth: 11 November 1968 (age 57)
- Place of birth: Genoa, Italy
- Height: 1.84 m (6 ft 0 in)
- Position: Forward

Team information
- Current team: Genoa (technical collaborator)

Youth career
- 1978–1983: Cosmos
- 1983–1985: Sampdoria
- 1985–1987: Genoa

Senior career*
Years	Team	Apps	(Gls)
1987–1994	Genoa	8	(0)
1988–1989	→ Legnano (loan)	20	(3)
1989–1990	→ Pro Vercelli (loan)	34	(9)
1990–1993	→ Massese (loan)	87	(23)
1994–1997	Vicenza	101	(35)
1997–1998	Piacenza	27	(5)
1998–1999	Napoli	19	(1)
1999–2000	Ravenna	34	(6)
2000–2001	Treviso	16	(4)
2001–2002	Alessandria	19	(4)
2002–2003	Savona	28	(6)
2003–2004	Derthona	27	(8)
2004–2005	Rapallo Ruentes	18	(8)

Managerial career
- 2004–2006: Rapallo Ruentes
- 2025: Genoa (interim)
- * Club domestic league appearances and goals

Roberto Murgita (born 11 November 1968) is an Italian former professional footballer who played as a forward, currently in charge as a technical collaborator of Genoa.

== Club career ==
Murgita made his professional debut as a player in 1987 with hometown club Genoa. He then went on loan to several minor league teams, eventually returning to Genoa in 1993 as an understudy to Tomáš Skuhravý.

In 1994, Murgita left Genoa to join Serie B club Vicenza, becoming one of the most renowned faces of the club's rise to Serie A and nationwide football, winning the 1996–97 Coppa Italia with the Biancorossi and forming a successful striking partnership with Uruguayan Marcelo Otero.

After a lacklustre Serie A season with Piacenza, Murgita joined then-Serie B club Napoli in 1998, but failed to break through the first team also due to recurring injuries. He then played in Serie B with Ravenna and Treviso, before moving down the leagues and eventually retiring in 2005.

== Coaching career ==
In 2004, he worked with amateur club Rapallo Ruentes as a player-coach, then became a full-time coach for the club in 2005. Successively, he joined former Vicenza teammate Domenico Di Carlo as his assistant from 2006 to 2012.

In 2011, Murgita obtained the UEFA Pro licence from the Centro Tecnico Federale di Coverciano, his thesis covering the role of strikers and goalkeepers in football.

In 2013, Murgita returned to Genoa as a member of the coaching staff, serving in various capacities as an assistant, technical collaborator, and youth coach within the club.

On 1 November 2025, Murgita was appointed in charge of Genoa on an interim basis, with Domenico Criscito as his assistant, following the departure of previous head coach Patrick Vieira. In his first game in charge, he led Genoa to a 2–1 away win against Sassuolo, the first one of the season for the Rossoblu. He left his role on 6 November 2025, following the appointment of Daniele De Rossi as the new head coach.

== Honours ==
Vicenza

- Coppa Italia: 1996–97
