= Bertrand Crasson =

Belgian footballer (born 1971)

Personal information
- Date of birth: 5 October 1971 (age 55)
- Place of birth: Brussels, Belgium
- Height: 1.78 m (5 ft 10 in)
- Position: Defender

Team information
- Current team: Wiltz 71 (manager)

Senior career*
Years	Team	Apps	(Gls)
1989–1996	Anderlecht	151	(13)
1996–1998	Napoli	44	(0)
1998–2003	Anderlecht	140	(6)
2003–2004	Lierse	28	(0)
2004–2005	Brussels	11	(0)
Total		374	(19)

International career
1991–2001	Belgium	26	(1)

Managerial career
- 2012–2018: Police Tero F.C. (youth)
- 2019: Dudelange (assistant)
- 2019: Dudelange (caretaker)
- 2019–2020: Dudelange
- 2023–: PSS Sleman (assistant)
- 2023: PSS Sleman (caretaker) and (U-18)
- 2026–: Wiltz 71
- * Club domestic league appearances and goals

Bertrand Crasson (born 5 October 1971) is a Belgian football manager and former player who played as a defender. He is currently the manager of Luxembourgish side Wiltz 71.

== Club career ==
Crasson was born in Brussels. He started his career at Anderlecht in 1989. He moved abroad to Serie A club Napoli in 1996, where he remained until 1998, before rejoining his previous side for five more seasons. Crasson then played with Lierse during the 2003–04 season, and Brussels the following season, retiring afterwards.

== International career ==
Internationally, Crasson was a member of the Belgium national team squad that took part at the 1998 FIFA World Cup, where he played 22 minutes (as a starter) in the team's 0–0 draw against the Netherlands. In total, he obtained 26 caps between 1991 and 2001, scoring once.

== Managerial career ==
From 2012 to 2018, Crasson worked in a role as Head of Academy Coaching for Police Tero in Thailand.

On 10 September 2019, Crasson was appointed assistant manager of F91 Dudelange under head manager Emilio Ferrera. Just one week after his arrival, Ferrera was fired and Crasson took charge on interim basis.

On 27 April 2023, Crasson joined the Indonesian Liga 1 club PSS Sleman under head coach Marian Mihail. After Mihail's departure, Crasson was appointed as the interim head coach on 10 October 2023. He was in charge for approximately six weeks, with a record of two defeats and two draws. On 16 November 2023, Crasson was replaced by the Serbian manager Risto Vidaković.

On 18 October 2026, Crasson joined Luxembourg National Division side Wiltz 71.

== Honours ==
Anderlecht

- Belgian First Division A: 1990–91, 1992–93, 1993–94, 1994–95, 1999–2000, 2000–01
- Belgian Cup: 1993–94
- Belgian Super Cup: 1993, 1995, 2000, 2001

Individual

- Belgian Young Professional Footballer of the Year: 1990–91
