= Maurizio Rossi (footballer, born 1970) =

Italian footballer

Personal information
- Date of birth: 16 February 1970 (age 56)
- Place of birth: Parma, Italy
- Height: 1.83 m (6 ft 0 in)
- Position: Forward

Senior career*
Years	Team	Apps	(Gls)
1988–1993	Rondinella	117	(20)
1993–1994	Aosta	30	(3)
1994–1997	Vicenza	95	(10)
1997–1998	Lecce	25	(7)
1998–1999	Treviso	33	(8)
1999–2000	Pescara	29	(9)
2000–2001	Vicenza	15	(0)
2001–2002	Siena	27	(3)
2002–2004	Venezia	55	(9)
2004–2005	Padova	6	(1)
2005–2006	Viterbese	18	(3)
2006–2007	Città di Jesolo	15	(1)
2008–2009	Union Virtus Romano Borso	?	(1)
Total		465	(75)

Managerial career
- 2008–2009: Union Virtus Romano Borso
- 2009–2010: Sandoná 1922
- 2010–2014: Miranese
- 2014: Venezia (caretaker)
- 2015: Clodiense
- 2016–2019: Venezia (youth)
- 2019–: Cittadella (youth)
- * Club domestic league appearances and goals

Maurizio Rossi (born 16 February 1970) is an Italian former professional footballer and manager, who played as a forward.

== Playing career ==
Having started his career with Rondinella, Rossi stood out especially for Vicenza, the team for which he gained access to Serie A in 1994–95. Rossi made history by scoring one of the extra time goals in the 1996–97 Coppa Italia finals for LR Vicenza against Napoli, which secured the team's surprising title. He also played for Lecce in Serie A, as well as several other clubs. He ended his career playing in the provincial leagues in Terza Categoria for Union Virtus Romano Borso.

== Managerial career ==
As a coach, Rossi had his first experience while still playing for Union Virtus Romano Borso. He also managed teams in Eccellenza and Serie D, in addition to serving as caretaker at Venezia in 2014. He coached in the youth sectors at Cittadella.

== Honours ==
Vicenza

- Coppa Italia: 1996–97

Union Virtus Romano Borso

- Terza Categoria: 2008–09
