= Giampiero Maini =

Italian footballer

Personal information
- Date of birth: 29 September 1971 (age 55)
- Place of birth: Rome, Italy
- Height: 1.79 m (5 ft 10 1/2 in)
- Position: Midfielder

Senior career*
Years	Team	Apps	(Gls)
1989–1995	Roma	8	(0)
1991–1993	→ Lecce (loan)	35	(3)
1993–1994	→ Ascoli (loan)	29	(6)
1995–1997	Vicenza	62	(7)
1997–1998	Milan	26	(0)
1998–1999	Bologna	19	(0)
1999–2002	Parma	7	(0)
2000–2001	→ Venezia (loan)	29	(4)
2002–2004	Ancona	39	(8)
2004–2005	Arezzo	7	(0)
2008–2009	Fabriano		
Total		261	(28)

International career
1997	Italy	1	(0)
- * Club domestic league appearances and goals

Giampiero "Jimmy" Maini (Italian pronunciation: [dʒamˈpjɛːro maˈiːni]; born 29 September 1971) is a retired Italian professional footballer who played as a midfielder.

== Club career ==
Maini began his career with Italian club Roma, where he won the Coppa Italia in 1991, later being loaned out to Lecce and Ascoli. He later also played for Vicenza, Milan, Bologna, Parma, Ancona, and Arezzo, before ending his career with Fabriano.

Whilst at Vicenza he won his second Coppa Italia title in 1997, scoring a goal in the 2nd leg of the final against Napoli.

In 1997, he joined Milan. He spent a year at the club and scored once; his goal coming in a Coppa Italia tie against Sampdoria, as Milan went on to reach the final, only to be defeated by Lazio.

He won his third and final Coppa Italia title with Parma in 2002 and the Supercoppa Italiana in 1999.

== International career ==
Maini was named in Italy's squad for the 1997 Tournoi de France under manager Cesare Maldini. At the tournament he made his first and only appearance for the national team in a 2–0 loss to England.

== Honours ==
Roma

- Coppa Italia winner: 1990–91.

Vicenza

- Coppa Italia winner: 1996–97.

Parma

- Supercoppa Italiana winner: 1999.
- Coppa Italia winner: 2001–02.
