= Piero Ceccarini =

Italian football referee (born 1953)

- Born: 20 October 1953 (age 73); Livorno, Italy
- Other occupation: Financial adviser

Domestic
Years	League	Role
1989–1999	Serie A	Referee

International
Years	League	Role
1992–1999	FIFA-listed	Referee

Piero Ceccarini (born 20 October 1953) is an Italian former football referee. He is mostly known for officiating the final of the 1994–95 UEFA Cup Winners' Cup, the second leg of the 1997 UEFA Super Cup, and for a controversial decision he made during a Serie A match in Turin between Juventus and Inter on 26 April 1998.

Ceccarini is known to have worked as a FIFA referee during the period from 1993 to 1998. He officiated in qualifiers for Euro 1996 (as well as one match at the final tournament), Euro 2000, and the 1998 World Cup.

== Career ==
Ceccarini was born in Livorno. He worked as a FIFA referee from 1993 to 1998.

He officiated the 1995 UEFA Cup Winners' Cup final between Arsenal and Zaragoza (1–2 a.e.t.).

In January 1996, he officiated the 1995 Supercoppa Italiana between Juventus and Parma. Later that year, he refereed one match in the 1996 UEFA European Football Championship in England, a 1–1 draw between Bulgaria and Spain in Group B, at Elland Road in Leeds, on 8 June; he had previously officiated the qualifiers for the tournament. The following season, he officiated the first leg of the 1997 Coppa Italia final between Napoli and Vicenza. The following season, Ceccarini also officiated the second leg of the UEFA Super Cup final between Borussia Dortmund and Barcelona (1–1, with Barcelona winning 3–1 on aggregate). Ceccarini also officiated qualifiers for the 1998 World Cup and Euro 2000.

=== 1997–98 Derby d'Italia ===
During the 1997–98 Serie A season, Ceccarini was at the centre of a controversial decision in Juventus's Derby d'Italia match in Turin against Inter on 26 April 1998, with both teams competing for the league title: a collision that occurred between Inter striker Ronaldo and Juventus defender Mark Iuliano in the Juventus penalty area, which saw both players go to ground, led the Inter players to claim what they felt to be a clear penalty for a tackle of obstruction, but Ceccarini let the play continue as the players continued to protest; to add to the controversy, Juventus were awarded a contested penalty only thirty seconds later, following a challenge from Taribo West on Alessandro Del Piero inside the Inter penalty area. Although Juventus did not convert the penalty successfully, they still ended up winning the match 1–0, and went on to win the league title mathematically two days later, following a 3–2 home win against Bologna, with Inter finishing in second place. Following the match Ceccarini came out publicly and stated that he had made a mistake, and that he should have called the foul and assigned a penalty to Inter for the challenge, although that, at the time, he did not witness the entire play that led to the incident, only the collision between the two players, which drew further criticism from the press. Up to this day, the incident has therefore acquired a degree of infamy, and is still widely debated in the Italian media, and often cited in newspapers. When asked about the episode in a 2009 interview, however, Ceccarini changed his view and said that in hindsight he would have not awarded a penalty, but instead an indirect free kick to Inter inside the penalty area for obstruction. In an even more recent interview with the newspaper Il Tirreno in 2016, however, Ceccarini later further clarified, "From the images it is clear that Ronaldo runs into Iuliano, not vice versa: as a matter of fact, the Juventus player falls backwards, resulting from the impact of Ronaldo running into him. I was on the pitch, a few meters away. The intention of the defender was to stop the attacker's progression, but the attacker moved the ball and the defender did not follow it. Iuliano was stationary at the moment of contact, there are no doubts about this. I told Pagliuca [Inter's goalkeeper] that in basketball this would be an offensive foul. Perhaps I ought to have blown a foul in favour of Juventus". He reaffirmed this opinion in 2018, 20 years after the incident.

== Major matches refereed ==
Date	Match	Tournament	Venue	Ref
10 May 1995	Arsenal vs. Zaragoza (1–2 a.e.t.)	1995 UEFA Cup Winners' Cup final	Parc des Princes, Paris	
11 March 1998	Borussia Dortmund vs. Barcelona (1–1; Barcelona won 3–1 on aggregate)	1997 UEFA Super Cup final (second leg)	Westfalenstadion, Dortmund	

== Honours ==
- Premio Giovanni Mauro: 1994–95

Preceded by UEFA Cup Winners' Cup Final 1994 (Czech Republic) Václav Krondl	UEFA Cup Winners' Cup Final Referees; Final 1995 (Italy) Piero Ceccarini	Succeeded by UEFA Cup Winners' Cup Final 1996 (Italy) Pierluigi Pairetto
