= Marcelo Otero =

Uruguayan footballer (born 1971)

Personal information
- Full name: Marcelo Alejandro Otero Larzábal
- Date of birth: 14 April 1971 (age 55)
- Place of birth: Montevideo, Uruguay
- Height: 1.76 m (5 ft 9 in)
- Position: Striker

Senior career*
Years	Team	Apps	(Gls)
1990–1992	Rampla Juniors	40	(16)
1992–1995	Peñarol	57	(29)
1995–1999	Vicenza	96	(37)
1999–2001	Sevilla	40	(2)
2001–2002	Colón de Santa Fe	14	(0)
2003	Fénix	12	(3)
2013–	Huracán del Paso de la Arena		

International career
1994–2000	Uruguay	24	(10)
- * Club domestic league appearances and goals

Marcelo Alejandro Otero Larzábal (born 14 April 1971) is an Uruguayan former professional footballer who played as a striker. He was nicknamed "Marujo" during his career, and is the younger brother of former midfielder Raul Otero.

Otero played in Uruguay for Rampla Juniors and Peñarol, in Italy for Vicenza, and in Spain for Sevilla. Whilst at Vicenza he won the 1996–97 Coppa Italia.

== International career ==
Otero made his senior debut for the Uruguay national team on 19 October 1994 in a friendly match against Peru (1–0 win) in the Estadio Nacional José Díaz in Lima, Peru. His older brother Raúl, a defender, also earned his first international cap in the same game. He was also part of the Urugua national side that won the Copa América 1995.

== Career statistics ==
Appearances and goals by national team and year
National team	Year	Apps	Goals
Uruguay	1994	1	0
Uruguay	1995	12	5
Uruguay	1996	4	1
Uruguay	1997	3	2
Uruguay	1998	0	0
Uruguay	1999	3	2
Uruguay	2000	1	0
Total		24	10

Scores and results list Uruguay's goal tally first, score column indicates score after each Otero goal.

List of international goals scored by Marcelo Otero
No.	Date	Venue	Opponent	Score	Result	Competition	Ref.
1	25 March 1995	Cotton Bowl, Dallas, United States	United States	1–2	2–2	Friendly	
2	5 July 1995	Estadio Centenario, Montevideo, Uruguay	Venezuela	2–0	4–1	1995 Copa América	
3	16 July 1995	Estadio Centenario, Montevideo, Uruguay	Bolivia	1–0	2–1	1995 Copa América	
4	19 July 1995	Estadio Centenario, Montevideo, Uruguay	Colombia	2–0	2–0	1995 Copa América	
5	20 September 1995	Teddy Stadium, Jerusalem, Israel	Israel	1–2	1–3	Friendly	
6	24 April 1996	Brígido Iriarte Stadium, Caracas, Venezuela	Venezuela	1–0	2–0	1998 FIFA World Cup qualification	
7	2 April 1997	Estadio Centenario, Montevideo, Uruguay	Venezuela	3–1	3–1	1998 FIFA World Cup qualification	
8	20 August 1997	Estadio Centenario, Montevideo, Uruguay	Chile	1–0	1–0	1998 FIFA World Cup qualification	
9	18 August 1999	Estadio Centenario, Montevideo, Uruguay	Costa Rica	1–1	5–4	Friendly	
10	18 August 1999	Estadio Centenario, Montevideo, Uruguay	Costa Rica	5–3	5–4	Friendly	

== Honours ==
Vicenza

- Coppa Italia : 1996–97

Uruguay

- Copa América: 1995
