= Massimiliano Esposito =

Italian footballer (born 1972)

Personal information
- Date of birth: 27 May 1972 (age 54)
- Place of birth: Naples, Italy
- Height: 1.75 m (5 ft 9 in)
- Position: Midfielder

Senior career*
Years	Team	Apps	(Gls)
1990–1993	Catanzaro	61	(8)
1993–1995	Reggiana	59	(9)
1995–1996	Lazio	17	(3)
1996–1997	Napoli	26	(2)
1997–1998	Verona	27	(0)
1998–1999	Napoli	20	(3)
1999–2000	Perugia	27	(1)
2000–2002	Brescia	34	(1)
2002	Chievo	9	(0)
2002–2005	Ternana	39	(4)
2005	Venezia	17	(3)
2005–2007	Triestina	17	(1)
2007–2009	Abano	?	(?)
2009–	Saccolongo	?	(?)
Total		353	(35)
- * Club domestic league appearances and goals

Massimiliano Esposito (born 27 May 1972), is an Italian beach soccer player and coach, and also a former professional footballer, who played as a playmaking midfielder or as a creative forward.

== Career ==
Born in Naples, Esposito started his professional career in Catanzaro in Serie C2, where he was a promising midfielder in the early 1990s. When Reggiana was promoted to Serie A in 1993, they signed Esposito as the team's playmaker, who went on to make his Serie A debut with the club. During his two years in Reggio Emilia, Esposito was one of the clubs' key players, helping to save the club from relegation to Serie B in 1994, although he was unable to prevent the club from being relegated the following season.

In the summer of 1995, one of the Italian giants of the time, Lazio, signed Esposito. He spent one season at the Roman club, but could not earn himself a regular spot in the starting XI, due to heavy competition from players such as Aron Winter and Roberto Di Matteo, for the first time in his career. He was subsequently sold to his hometown club Napoli, where he performed decently during the 1996–97 season, before unexpectedly being sold to Hellas Verona in the midst of the league campaign. Following his time in Serie B with Verona, he returned to Napoli the following season, although the club had been relegated in 1998. Esposito's second foray at Napoli in Serie B did not result in a promotion, and he left for Serie A club Perugia at the end of the season. In the three years following his time with Perugia, Esposito spent his last years in Serie A as a player, with Brescia, playing alongside Roberto Baggio, and Chievo; in total, he played about 172 matches in the top domestic division, scoring 16 goals. Before rounding off his career with several amateur clubs between 2007 and 2012, he also played for three Serie B sides between 2002 and 2007: Ternana, Venezia, and Triestina.

Following Esposito's retirement from professional football, he worked as a coach and also became a stalwart in the Italian beach soccer national team; in 2010 he took on a role as a player-manager with the Italian national beach soccer team.

== Sources ==
- Italian Wikipedia

Tuttocalciatori.net (Italian)
