= Massimo Beghetto =

Italian footballer (born 1968)

Personal information
- Date of birth: 19 November 1968 (age 57)
- Place of birth: Tombolo, Italy
- Height: 1.78 m (5 ft 10 in)
- Position: Defender

Senior career*
Years	Team	Apps	(Gls)
1985–1987	Montebelluna	41	(2)
1987	Venezia	3	(0)
1988	Bologna	2	(0)
1988–1990	Chievo	47	(3)
1990–1996	Perugia	172	(5)
1996–2001	Vicenza	122	(5)
2001–2002	Dundee	21	(0)
2002	Sliema Wanderers	3	(0)
2002–2006	Bassano	76	(5)

Managerial career
- 2009–2010: Bassano
- 2010–2011: Vicenza (assistant coach)
- 2011–2012: Vicenza (youth coach)
- 2012: Vicenza
- * Club domestic league appearances and goals

Massimo Beghetto (born 19 November 1968) is an Italian former professional footballer who played as a defender. He briefly coached of Vicenza Calcio and Bassano.

== Playing career ==
Beghetto was born in Tombolo. A defender, he played for Venezia, Bologna, Chievo, Perugia, Vicenza Calcio, Dundee, Sliema Wanderers, Bassano. Whilst at Vicenza he won the 1996–97 Coppa Italia.

== Coaching career ==
In the season 2010–11 he has been assistant coach to Rolando Maran at Serie B club Vicenza Calcio, after having served as head coach of Bassano Virtus 55 S.T. during the club's 2009–10 campaign.

Since 4 March to 29 April 2012, when he was sacked, has been the coach of Vicenza Calcio, in place of the sacked Luigi Cagni, after that in the same season has coached the youth team.

== Personal life ==
His father, Giuseppe is a former Olympic champion, and both his brother Luigi and his son Andrea are professional footballers.

== Honours ==
=== Player ===
Vicenza

- Coppa Italia: 1996–97
