= Gustavo Méndez =

Uruguayan footballer (born 1971)

Personal information
- Full name: Gustavo Emilio Méndez Techera
- Date of birth: 3 February 1971 (age 55)
- Place of birth: Montevideo, Uruguay
- Height: 1.75 m (5 ft 9 in)
- Position: Right back

Senior career*
Years	Team	Apps	(Gls)
1990–1995	Nacional	68	(5)
1995–1999	Vicenza	98	(2)
1999–2001	Torino	30	(1)
2002–2005	Nacional	62	(5)
Total		258	(13)

International career
1993–2002	Uruguay	45	(0)
Medal record
Representing Uruguay
Copa América
Winner	1995 Uruguay
- * Club domestic league appearances and goals

Gustavo Emilio Méndez Techera (born 3 February 1971) is a Uruguayan former footballer who played as a defender. He played for several clubs, including Nacional (Uruguay), Vicenza Calcio (Italy) and Torino FC (Italy). Whilst at Vicenza he won the 1996–97 Coppa Italia. For the Uruguay national football team Méndez was a participant at the 2002 FIFA World Cup.

== Honours ==
Vicenza

- Coppa Italia: 1996–97
