= Fabio Pecchia =

Italian football manager (born 1973)

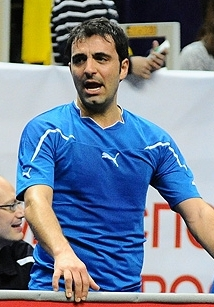
- Pecchia in 2011

Personal information
- Full name: Fabio Pecchia
- Date of birth: 24 August 1973 (age 53)
- Place of birth: Formia, Italy
- Height: 1.71 m (5 ft 7 in)
- Position: Midfielder

Senior career*
Years	Team	Apps	(Gls)
1991–1993	Avellino	4	(0)
1993–1997	Napoli	125	(15)
1997–1998	Juventus	21	(1)
1998–1999	Sampdoria	26	(1)
1999–2001	Torino	22	(1)
2000–2001	→ Napoli (loan)	27	(6)
2001–2006	Bologna	33	(5)
2002–2003	→ Como (loan)	27	(6)
2004–2005	→ Siena (loan)	59	(7)
2006–2007	Ascoli	23	(2)
2007	Foggia	6	(0)
2007–2008	Frosinone	14	(4)
2008–2009	Foggia	26	(1)
Total		466	(51)

International career
1993–1996	Italy U21	11	(0)
1996	Italy Olympic	3	(0)

Managerial career
- 2011: Gubbio
- 2012–2013: Latina
- 2016–2018: Hellas Verona
- 2018–2019: Avispa Fukuoka
- 2019–2020: Juventus U23
- 2021–2022: Cremonese
- 2022–2025: Parma
- 2026-: Cremonese
Medal record
Men's football
Representing Italy
UEFA European Under-21 Championship
Winner	1996 Spain
- * Club domestic league appearances and goals

Fabio Pecchia (Italian pronunciation: [ˈfaːbjo ˈpekkja]; born 24 August 1973) is an Italian professional football manager and former player. Throughout his playing career as a midfielder, he was also known as l'avvocato ("The Lawyer" in Italian), as he obtained a law degree through the University of Naples.

== Club career ==
A journeyman with eleven different clubs in his career, Pecchia amassed over 300 Serie A (the first division of the Italian football league system) appearances. He began his Italian football career with Avellino in 1991, and remained at the club for two seasons. Despite strong interest from Parma, he moved to Napoli in 1993, where he played for four seasons, becoming a key figure for the club, although he later struggled to establish himself in other teams. He made his Serie A debut with the Neapolitan club on 29 August 1993, at the age of 20, becoming a vital member of Marcello Lippi's midfield; Pecchia's tactical versatility, speed, technique, vision, and passing range allowed him to excel in Lippi's offensive tactical system, which made frequent use of long balls and fast-paced football. With Napoli, Pecchia soon established himself as one of the most promising and talented young Italian stars of the 1990s due to his leadership and work-rate; during his first season with Napoli, he helped the club qualify for the 1994–95 UEFA Cup.

Pecchia remained at the club for three more seasons despite the club's financial difficulties and lack of success during this time. During the 1996–97 season, he was named Napoli's captain, and he helped the club to reach the 1997 Coppa Italia final under head coach Luigi Simoni, in which Napoli was defeated by Vicenza in extra time; during the first leg of the final, Pecchia scored Napoli's winning goal. Despite his attachment to the club, he was sold to Juventus in 1997 for 10 billion Lit., in an attempt to manage the club's debts; he would later return on loan to Napoli for a single season in 2001. In total, he made 152 appearances for Napoli, scoring 21 goals.

Pecchia spent a single season with Juventus during the 1997–98 season under Lippi, his former Napoli head coach, winning the 1997 Supercoppa Italiana and the Serie A title with the club that season, also reaching the 1998 UEFA Champions League final. He made 21 league appearances that season, and scored a decisive goal against Empoli to claim the league title. He struggled to break into the first team, and was usually used as a reserve due to the presence of Zinedine Zidane and Edgar Davids in Juventus's midfield. Pecchia was subsequently loaned out to Sampdoria for the 1998–99 season, and he was sold to cross-city rivals Torino for 5.9 billion Italian lire (€3,047,096) in 1999, playing the 1999–2000 season with the Turin club, and suffering relegation to the 2000–01 Serie B. In June 2001, Juventus gave up the remain 50% registration rights to Torino.

In the 2000–01 season, Pecchia moved back to Napoli on loan, although he was unable to save the club from relegation. He spent the 2001–02 season with Bologna, and remained with the club until the 2005–06 season, although he spent the 2002–03 season with Como, and was loaned out to Siena during the 2004–05 season. He spent the first half of the 2006–07 Serie A season with Ascoli; on 31 January 2007, he was signed by Serie C1 side Foggia. On 10 July 2007 he signed a 1-year contract with Serie B club Frosinone, making 26 appearances for the club, and scoring a goal in a home fixture against ChievoVerona. On 10 June 2008, he returned to Foggia, signing a two-year contract that would keep him at the club until 2010, although he retired during the summer of 2009. In total, he made 446 appearances throughout his career, scoring 50 goals. He made 337 appearances in Serie A, scoring 41 goals; 62 in Serie B, scoring four goals; and 47 appearances in Serie C, scoring five goals.

== International career ==
Although he never represented Italy at senior level, Pecchia played for the Italy national under-21 football team on eleven occasions between 1993 and 1996, under manager Cesare Maldini, and was a member of the team that won the 1996 UEFA European Under-21 Championship; he also competed for Italy at the 1996 Summer Olympics, making three appearances.

== Managerial career ==
Pecchia retired from playing football in 2009, and subsequently became Foggia's assistant coach. He left his coaching post by mutual consent, together with head coach Antonio Porta, on 19 January 2010. On 18 June 2011, he was appointed head coach of Serie B club Gubbio. He was removed from his managerial post on 16 October 2011 due to poor results. In the 2012–13 season, Pecchia became the new head coach of Latina, helping the team earn Serie B promotion. From 21 June 2013, he served as assistant coach for Rafael Benítez at his former club Napoli.

From 3 June 2015 to 4 January 2016, Pecchia was assistant coach at Real Madrid under Benítez. When the Spaniard was announced as Newcastle United on 11 March, Pecchia was also announced as part of the coaching set up. In July 2016, Pecchia took over as new head coach of Serie B club Hellas Verona, with the clear goal to bring the club back to the top flight. He completed the 2016–17 Serie B season in second place, thus winning automatic promotion to Serie A in his first attempt, and was confirmed in charge of the club for the 2017–18 Serie A. He could not help them avoid relegation in the 2018–19 Serie A, and left the team at the end of the campaign. In December 2018, Pecchia was announced as coach of Avispa Fukuoka, a Japanese club active in the J2 League. He left the team on 3 June 2019, resigning for personal reasons. The following summer, he returned to Italy, becoming the coach of Juventus U23 in Serie C.

On 27 June 2020, he led Juventus U23 to winning the Coppa Italia Serie C with a 2–1 victory over Ternana. On 7 January 2021, Pecchia returned into management after being appointed head coach of Serie B club Cremonese. After guiding them to promotion to Serie A by the end of the 2021–22 Serie B season, he unexpectedly resigned from his post on 21 May 2022. On 2 June 2022, just a few days after leaving Cremonese, Pecchia was announced as the new head coach of Serie B club Parma. Later on, he led Parma back to Serie A, by finishing top in the 2023–24 season.

== Style of play ==
Pecchia was capable of playing on both midfield wings, despite being naturally right-footed. A versatile player, he was able to adapt to any midfield position, and also deployed as an attacking midfielder, or in the centre as a defensive midfielder on occasion. Throughout his career, he was known in particular for his vision, and excellent long-passing ability, although he was also a quick, dynamic, hard-working, and creative player, with good technical ability, who was known for his speed on the ball. He was also known for his offensive movement off the ball, as well as his ability to lose his markers and find open spaces by making attacking runs into positions from which he could receive and subsequently distribute the ball to teammates. These attributes enabled him to be extremely adept at starting attacking plays, in particular during counter-attacks, and made him a serious offensive threat. In addition to his playing ability, he was also known for his leadership qualities.

== Managerial statistics ==
As of match played 16 February 2025

Managerial record by team and tenure
Team	Nat	From	To	Record							
Team	Nat	From	To	G	W	D	L	GF	GA	GD	Win %
Gubbio	(Italy)	18 June 2011	16 October 2011	12	2	5	5	16	26	−10	16.67
Latina	(Italy)	17 June 2012	8 April 2013	35	18	9	8	46	32	+14	51.43
Hellas Verona	(Italy)	2 June 2016	13 June 2018	86	30	19	37	102	129	−27	34.88
Avispa Fukuoka	(Japan)	14 December 2018	3 June 2019	16	4	4	8	13	21	−8	25.00
Juventus U23	(Italy)	29 June 2019	17 July 2020	37	15	14	8	50	43	+7	40.54
Cremonese	(Italy)	7 January 2021	21 May 2022	60	29	16	15	88	60	+28	48.33
Parma	(Italy)	2 June 2022	17 February 2025	110	46	33	31	159	129	+30	41.82
Total				356	144	100	112	474	440	+34	40.45

== Honours ==
=== Player ===
Juventus

- Serie A: 1997–98
- Supercoppa Italiana: 1997

Italy U21

- UEFA European Under-21 Championship: 1996

=== Manager ===
Juventus U23

- Coppa Italia Serie C: 2019–20

Parma

- Serie B: 2023–24
