= Alessandro Iannuzzi =

Italian footballer (born 1975)

Personal information
- Date of birth: 9 October 1975 (age 51)
- Place of birth: Rome, Italy
- Position: Forward

Senior career*
Years	Team	Apps	(Gls)
1995–1999	Lazio	6	(1)
1996–1997	→ Vicenza (loan)	17	(2)
1997–1998	→ Lecce (loan)	8	(1)
1999–2001	Milan	0	(0)
1999–2000	→ Reggina (loan)	3	(0)
2000–2001	→ Monza (loan)		
2001–2004	Messina	44	(4)
2003–2004	Perugia		
2004	Pescara	7	(0)
2004–2005	Teramo	5	(0)
2005–2006	Gualdo Casacastalda	26	(2)
2006–2007	Monterotondo		
2007–2008	Guidonia Montecelio		
2009	Fidene		
2009–2010	Vis Artena		
2010	Pro Calcio Sabina		
2010–2011	Pianoscarano		
- * Club domestic league appearances and goals

Alessandro Iannuzzi (born 9 October 1975) is an Italian football manager and former player who manages the youth academy of Lazio.

== Early life ==
Iannuzzi was born in 1975 in Rome, Italy.

== Club career ==
Iannuzzi started his career with Italian Serie A side Lazio. In 1996, he was sent on loan to Italian side Vicenza, helping them win the 1997 Coppa Italia. In 1999, he signed for Italian Serie A side Milan.

== Style of play ==
Iannuzzi mainly operated as a forward.

== International career ==
Iannuzzi represented Italy internationally at youth level.
