= Domenico Di Carlo =

Italian football coach (born 1964)

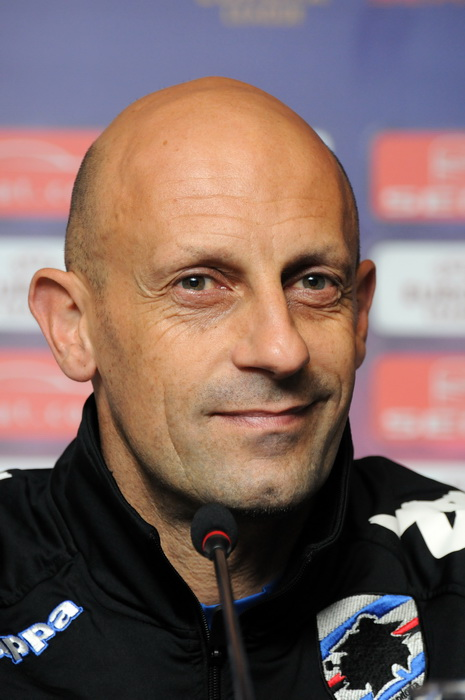
- Di Carlo as the manager of Sampdoria

Personal information
- Full name: Domenico Di Carlo
- Date of birth: 23 March 1964 (age 62)
- Place of birth: Cassino, Italy
- Position: Defensive midfielder

Senior career*
Years	Team	Apps	(Gls)
1979–1981	Real Cassino	37	(1)
1981–1982	Treviso	26	(1)
1982–1984	Como	0	(0)
1984–1986	Treviso	55	(3)
1986–1987	Ternana	30	(3)
1987–1990	Palermo	97	(6)
1990–1999	Vicenza	266	(9)
1999–2000	Lecce	4	(0)
2000–2001	Livorno	27	(0)
2001	Südtirol	0	(0)

Managerial career
- 2001–2003: Vicenza (youth coach)
- 2003–2007: Mantova
- 2007–2008: Parma
- 2008–2010: Chievo
- 2010–2011: Sampdoria
- 2011–2012: Chievo
- 2014: Livorno
- 2014–2015: Cesena
- 2015–2017: Spezia
- 2018: Novara
- 2018–2019: Chievo
- 2019–2021: Vicenza
- 2022–2023: Pordenone
- 2023: Pordenone
- 2023: SPAL
- 2024: SPAL
- 2024–2025: Ascoli
- 2025–2026: Gubbio
- * Club domestic league appearances and goals

Domenico "Mimmo" Di Carlo (born 23 March 1964) is an Italian football coach and a former player.

== Career ==
=== Player ===
Di Carlo started his career in his native city, playing as a midfielder for the local Serie C2 team Real Cassino.

After playing several seasons for Treviso, Ternana, Como (where he never appeared in the first-team lineup), and Palermo, where he helped the team obtain promotion to Serie C1, Di Carlo signed for Serie C1 team Vicenza in 1990. He quickly became one of the key players for the team, with whom he played nine seasons, obtaining two promotions (from Serie C1 to Serie A), one Coppa Italia and reaching the Cup Winners' Cup semi-finals the following year. He left Vicenza in 1999 when he joined Lecce, again in Serie A. His last playing season was in 2000-01 for Livorno of Serie C1, even though in November, he joined Südtirol of Serie C2 for a very short time.

=== Coach ===
After a period in Vicenza, where he coached the Primavera youth team, Di Carlo was signed as coach of the Serie C2 team Mantova in 2003. He led the team to back-to-back promotions up to Serie B; his first Serie B campaign as head coach turned out to be even more successful, as his team surprisingly obtained a place in the promotion play-off finals, being defeated by Torino after extra time. He coached Mantova in their 2006–07 Serie B campaign, finishing eighth and being the first side to defeat Juventus in its first appearance in the division. In June 2007, he left Mantova.

On 12 June 2007, he was confirmed as the head coach of Serie A team Parma. In his time there, he struggled to keep the crociati out of the relegation zone, only to be ultimately sacked on 10 March 2008 following a 1–2 home loss to Sampdoria.

On 4 November 2008, he was appointed as the new Chievo boss following the dismissal of previous coach Giuseppe Iachini. He guided Chievo to two consecutive mid-table placements in the Serie A, which were hailed as impressive results considering the difficulty of competing against more renowned teams with one of the lowest budgets in the league. On 26 May 2010, Di Carlo was confirmed to have resigned from his coaching post at Chievo.

On the same day, he was announced as new head coach of Sampdoria, with whom he made his managerial debut on the European stage in the third qualifying round of the 2010–11 UEFA Champions League and then the 2010–11 UEFA Europa League. Sampdoria's form in Serie A so far had been middling, with the Blucerchiati keeping a tight defence, but struggling to score, especially after the departures of Antonio Cassano and Giampaolo Pazzini. He was sacked on 7 March 2011 after a home loss of 3–2 against Cesena, the last match of a run of ten games that included seven losses and just one win. He was replaced by Alberto Cavasin on the same day.

On 9 June 2011, Di Carlo agreed to return to serve as head coach of Chievo for the 2011–12 season. He saved his team from relegation in his first season in charge, but was removed from his duties on 2 October 2012 and replaced by Eugenio Corini following a dismal start to the 2012–13 season.

He then briefly served as head coach of Livorno at the end of the 2013–14 season in a desperate but ultimately unsuccessful attempt by the club to escape relegation.

On 8 December 2014, he was named new head coach of Serie A relegation strugglers Cesena in place of Pierpaolo Bisoli.

On 5 February 2018, he signed with Serie B club Novara. The club was relegated at the end of the season and Di Carlo was replaced.

On 13 November 2018, Di Carlo was appointed manager of Chievo after the resignation of Gian Piero Ventura.

On 1 June 2019, Di Carlo was appointed manager of Vicenza. He guided Vicenza to promotion to Serie B on his first full season in charge and was successively confirmed for the team's return to the second division. He was sacked on 22 September 2021, following a dismal start in the 2021–22 Serie B season.

On 1 June 2022, Pordenone announced the hiring of Di Carlo as their new head coach, effective from 1 July, on a two-year deal. He was dismissed on 6 March 2023, following a home draw to Pergolettese that left Pordenone in third place in the league table. On 11 April 2023, the club re-appointed him as the head coach.

On 11 July 2023, Di Carlo was announced as the new head coach of Serie C club SPAL, signing a contract until the end of the season. His stint with the Emilia-Romagna club was, however, short-lived, as he was dismissed on 2 October 2023 following a negative start to the season. He was re-hired as SPAL coach on 4 February 2024, taking over from Leonardo Colucci. He departed from SPAL for good by the end of the season.

On 3 October 2024, Di Carlo took over as the new head coach of Serie C club Ascoli. He was sacked on 25 January 2025 after a 1–2 loss to Lucchese; the announcement was made by the club chairman, Massimo Pulcinelli, through an Instagram story just minutes after the end of the game.

On 24 June 2025, Di Carlo was hired as the new head coach of Serie C club Gubbio. He was dismissed on 4 October 2026.

== Managerial statistics ==
As of 24 January 2024

Managerial record by team and tenure
Team	From	To	Record							
Team	From	To	G	W	D	L	GF	GA	GD	Win %
Mantova	1 July 2003	11 June 2007	177	79	63	35	219	148	+71	44.63
Parma	12 June 2007	10 March 2008	28	5	10	13	33	46	−13	17.86
Chievo	4 November 2008	26 May 2010	69	21	19	29	73	78	−5	30.43
Sampdoria	26 May 2010	7 March 2011	38	9	13	16	36	48	−12	23.68
Chievo	9 June 2011	2 October 2012	49	17	13	19	49	60	−11	34.69
Livorno	21 January 2014	21 April 2014	14	3	3	8	20	31	−11	21.43
Cesena	8 December 2014	6 June 2015	24	3	7	14	25	48	−23	12.50
Spezia	23 November 2015	30 June 2017	81	32	27	22	82	70	+12	39.51
Novara	5 February 2018	10 June 2018	18	3	8	7	16	22	−6	16.67
Chievo	13 November 2018	31 May 2019	27	2	11	14	16	47	−31	7.41
Vicenza	1 June 2019	22 September 2021	77	32	22	23	108	91	+17	41.56
Pordenone	1 June 2022	6 March 2023	31	13	12	6	47	28	+19	41.94
Pordenone	11 April 2023	10 July 2023	4	2	0	2	4	5	−1	50.00
SPAL	11 July 2023	2 October 2023	5	2	0	3	4	6	−2	40.00
Total			642	223	208	211	732	728	+4	34.74

== Honours ==
=== Player ===
Vicenza

- Coppa Italia: 1997

=== Managerial ===
Mantova

- Serie C2 (1): 2003–04

Vicenza

- Serie C (1): 2019–20 (Girone B)
