= 1996–97 Coppa Italia =

Tournament details
- Country: Italy
- Dates: 24 Aug 1996 – 29 May 1997
- Teams: 48

Final positions
- Champions: Vicenza (1st title)
- Runners-up: Napoli

Tournament statistics
- Matches played: 54
- Goals scored: 147 (2.72 per match)
- Top goal scorer(s): Riccardo Maspero; Ivan Zamorano (5 goals)

The 1996–97 Coppa Italia, the 50th Coppa Italia was an Italian Football Federation domestic cup competition won by Vicenza.

== Preliminary round ==
Home team	Away team	Result
Empoli (2)	Reggina (2)	0–2
Spal (3)	Atalanta (1)	2–1
Lecce (2)	Genoa (2)	0–2
Brescia (2)	Lucchese (2)	0–2
Como (3)	Cremonese (2)	2-2 (p:4-5)
Castel di Sangro (2)	Cesena (2)	0–2
Gualdo (3)	Torino (2)	0–2
Pistoiese (3)	Cosenza (2)	0–3
Avellino (3)	Venezia (2)	2–1 (aet)
Ascoli (3)	Bari (2)	1–2
Ancona (3)	Pescara (2)	1–2
Monza (3)	Padova (2)	1–0
Chievo (2)	Salernitana (2)	1–0
Ravenna (2)	Palermo (2)	3–1
Nocerina (3)	Piacenza (1)	0-0 (p: 4-3)
Fidelis Andria (3)	Foggia (2)	3–0

p=after penalty shoot-out

== Final phase ==
Home team	Away team	Result
Empoli (2)	Milan (1)	1–3
Spal (3)	Reggiana (1)	2–4
Genoa (2)	Sampdoria (1)	4–2
Lucchese (2)	Vicenza (1)	1–2
Cremonese (2)	Udinese (1)	2–1
Cesena (2)	Roma (1)	3–1
Bologna (1)	Torino (2)	2–1
Fiorentina (1)	Cosenza (2)	3–1
Avellino (3)	Lazio (1)	0–1
Hellas Verona (1)	Bari (2)	4–1
Parma (1)	Pescara (2)	1–3
Monza (3)	Napoli (1)	0–1
Chievo (2)	Cagliari (1)	2–3
Ravenna (2)	Internazionale (1)	0–1
Nocerina (3)	Perugia (1)	2–1
Fidelis Andria (3)	Juventus (1)	0–2

== Knockout stage ==
Round of 16
Reggiana	0
Milan	2
Genoa	1
Vicenza	2
Cesena	1
Cremonese	2
Bologna	3
Fiorentina	1
Hellas Verona	1
Lazio	2
Pescara	0
Napoli	1
Cagliari	3
Internazionale	4
Nocerina	1
Juventus	2

Quarter-finals
Milan	1 (0)
Vicenza	1 (0)
Cremonese	1 (1)
Bologna	2 (3)
Napoli	1 (1)
Lazio	1 (0)
Juventus	1 (0)
Internazionale	1 (3)

Semi-finals
Vicenza	1 (1)
Bologna	1 (0)
Internazionale	1 (1) p:3
Napoli	1 (1) p:5

Final
Vicenza	3 (0)
Napoli	0 (1)

== Final ==
=== First leg ===
8 May 1997
20:45

Napoli	1–0	Vicenza
Pecchia 21'

Stadio San Paolo, Naples
Attendance: 65,932
Referee: Paolo Ceccarini

=== Second leg ===
29 May 1997
20:45

Vicenza	3–0 (a.e.t.)	Napoli
Maini 21'; M. Rossi 118'; Iannuzzi 120'

Stadio Romeo Menti, Vicenza
Attendance: 19,144
Referee: Stefano Braschi

Vicenza won 3–1 on aggregate.

== Top goalscorers ==
Rank	Player	Club	Goals
1	(Italy) Riccardo Maspero	Cremonese	5
1	(Chile) Iván Zamorano	Internazionale	5
3	(Sweden) Kennet Andersson	Bologna	3
3	(Italy) Giovanni Cornacchini	Vicenza	3
3	(Italy) Luigi Marulla	Cosenza	3
3	(Italy) Roberto Baggio	Milan	3
3	(Italy) Sandro Tovalieri	Reggiana	3
3	(Italy) Dario Hübner	Cesena	3
