= 1997–98 SSC Napoli season =

Napoli
1997–98 season
- Owner: Corrado Ferlaino
- President: Gian Marco Innocenti
- Manager: Bortolo Mutti (until 6 October 1997); Carlo Mazzone (until 24 November 1997); Giovanni Galeone (until 9 February 1998); Vincenzo Montefusco
- Stadium: San Paolo
- Serie A: 18th (in 1998-99 Serie B)
- Coppa Italia: Last 16
- Top goalscorer: Claudio Bellucci (10)
Home colours	Away colours	Third colours

S.S.C. Napoli crashed out of Serie A following a disastrous season. It only clinched 14 points out of 34 matches, despite having the services of several experienced Serie A players. Napoli went through four coaches over the course of the season, and hardly took a point in the second half of the season. Given the disastrous form of the team, Claudio Bellucci's ten goals were impressive, while thought top scorer Igor Protti was one of the largest disappointments of the entire series. The lack of defensive skills cost Napoli many points, and more than two goals were conceded on average. This was despite Roberto Ayala's brilliance, which earned him a transfer to Milan.

Only eight years following Napoli's second title, the club seemed to be in terminal decline, with hard work being needed to return to the top domestic league. Given that the club had not been relegated since a bankruptcy in 1964, the relegation was a shock, by the extremely poor season.

== Squad ==
Note: Flags indicate national team as defined under FIFA eligibility rules; some limited exceptions apply. Players may hold more than one non-FIFA nationality.

No.	Pos.	Nation	Player
1	GK	ITA	Giuseppe Taglialatela
2	DF	FRA	William Prunier
3	DF	ITA	Raffaele Sergio
4	MF	ITA	Fabio Rossitto
5	DF	ITA	Mauro Facci
6	DF	ARG	Roberto Ayala
7	MF	ITA	Francesco Turrini
8	MF	ITA	Raffaele Longo
9	FW	ITA	Claudio Bellucci
10	FW	ITA	Igor Protti
11	FW	ARG	José Luis Calderón
12	GK	ITA	Raffaele Di Fusco
13	DF	ITA	Luigi Panarelli
14	MF	ITA	Luca Altomare
15	DF	ITA	Francesco Baldini
16	DF	ITA	Luigi Malafronte

No.	Pos.	Nation	Player
17	MF	ITA	Angelo Cimadomo
18	MF	ITA	Roberto Goretti
19	MF	ITA	Gennaro Scarlato
20	MF	ITA	Massimiliano Esposito
21	DF	ITA	Alessandro Sbrizzo
22	DF	BEL	Bertrand Crasson
23	GK	ITA	Ferdinando Coppola
24	DF	ITA	Mirko Conte
25	MF	FRA	Reynald Pedros
26	MF	ITA	Marco Zamboni
27	MF	ITA	Giuseppe Giannini
28	MF	ITA	Massimiliano Allegri
29	FW	ITA	Salvatore Bruno
30	MF	CRO	Aljoša Asanović
31	FW	YUG	Damir Stojak
32	DF	ITA	Emanuele Troise
33	DF	ITA	Guglielmo Stendardo

=== Transfers ===
In
Pos.	Name	from	Type
FW	Igor Protti	Lazio	loan
MF	Fabio Rossitto	Udinese	
DF	Raffaele Sergio	Udinese	
FW	Claudio Bellucci	Venezia	
FW	José Luis Calderón	Independiente	
DF	Mirko Conte	Piacenza	
MF	Giuseppe Giannini	Sturm Graz	
DF	William Prunier	Manchester United	
DF	Mauro Facci	Salernitana	

Out
Pos.	Name	To	Type
MF	Fabio Pecchia	Juventus	
MF	Alain Boghossian	Sampdoria	
DF	André Cruz	A.C. Milan	
DF	Francesco Colonnese	AS Roma	loan ended
DF	Mauro Milanese	Parma	
MF	Beto	Flamengo	
FW	Caio	Inter	loan ended
FW	Nicola Caccia	Atalanta	
FW	Alfredo Aglietti	Verona	
FW	Dino Fava Passaro	Acireale	

==== Winter ====
In
Pos.	Name	from	Type
FW	Damir Stojak	Vojvodina	
MF	Reynald Pedros	Parma	
MF	Massimiliano Allegri	Padova	
FW	Aljoša Asanović	Derby County	

Out
Pos.	Name	To	Type
FW	José Luis Calderón	Independiente	
DF	Mirko Conte	Vicenza	
DF	Mirko Taccola	Lucchese	
DF	Alessandro Sbrizzo	Padova	
DF	William Prunier	Hearts	
MF	Massimiliano Esposito	Hellas Verona	
DF	Marco Zamboni	Chievo	
MF	Giuseppe Giannini	Lecce	

== Competitions ==
=== Serie A ===
==== League table ====
Pos	Team	Pld	W	D	L	GF	GA	GD	Pts	Qualification or relegation
14	Vicenza	34	9	9	16	36	61	−25	36	
15	Brescia (R)	34	9	8	17	45	63	−18	35	Relegation to Serie B
16	Atalanta (R)	34	7	11	16	25	48	−23	32	Relegation to Serie B
17	Lecce (R)	34	6	8	20	32	72	−40	26	Relegation to Serie B
18	Napoli (R)	34	2	8	24	25	76	−51	14	Relegation to Serie B

Source: 1997–98 Serie A, RSSSF.com, Soccerway
Rules for classification: 1) Points; 2) Head-to-head points; 3) Head-to-head goal difference; 4) Goal difference; 5) Goals scored; 6) Draw. (Note: Head-to-head record is used only after all the matches between the teams in question have been played).
(R) Relegated

==== Results by round ====
Round	1	2	3	4	5	6	7	8	9	10	11	12	13	14	15	16	17	18	19	20	21	22	23	24	25	26	27	28	29	30	31	32	33	34
Ground	H	A	H	A	H	A	H	A	H	A	A	H	A	H	A	H	A	A	H	A	H	A	H	A	H	A	H	H	A	H	A	H	A	H
Result	L	W	D	L	L	L	L	L	L	D	L	L	L	L	D	L	L	D	L	W	L	L	L	D	D	L	L	L	L	L	D	L	L	D
Position	11	9	8	12	14	14	17	17	17	18	18	18	18	18	18	18	18	18	18	18	18	18	18	18	18	18	18	18	18	18	18	18	18	18

Source: Competitive matches
A = Away; H = Home; W = Win; D = Draw; L = Loss; P = Postponed; = Leader, 1998–99 UEFA Champions League Group stage; = 1998–99 UEFA Champions League Second Qualifying round; = 1998–99 UEFA Cup First round; = Qualification to Intertoto Cup second round; = Qualification to Intertoto Cup third round; = 1998–99 Serie B

==== Matches ====
31 August 1997 1	Lazio	2–0	Napoli	Rome
	Mancini 68'; Pancaro 76'			Stadium: Olimpico

14 September 1997 2	Napoli	2–1	Empoli	Naples
	Bellucci 33'; Protti 48'		C. Esposito 77'	Stadium: San Paolo

21 September 1997 3	Vicenza	1–1	Napoli	Vicenza
	Di Napoli 17'		Turrini 18'

28 September 1997 4	Napoli	0–1	Atalanta	Naples
			Caccia 50'	Stadium: San Paolo

05 October 1997 5	Roma	6–2	Napoli	Rome
	Candela 16'; Gautieri 34'; Balbo 51, 60, 89'; Di Francesco 53'		Altomare 71'; Bellucci 87' (pen.)	Stadium: Olimpico

18 October 1997 6	Napoli	0–2	Inter Milan	Naples
			Galante 10'; Turrini 69' (o.g.)	Stadium: San Paolo

02 November 1997 7	Bologna	5–1	Napoli	Bologna
	R. Baggio 48' (pen.) 90' 90 + 5' (pen.); K. Andersson 55, 90 + 3'		Goretti 14'	Stadium: Renato Dall'Ara

09 November 1997 8	Napoli	1–2	Juventus	Naples
	Bellucci 55'		Zidane 38'; Fonseca 88'	Stadium: San Paolo

23 November 1997 9	Lecce	2–0	Napoli	Lecco
	M. Rossi 50'; Palmieri 61'

30 November 1997 10	Napoli	1–1	Fiorentina	Naples
	Turrini 34'		28' Firicano	Stadium: San Paolo

07 December 1997 11	Piacenza	1–0	Napoli	Piacenza
	Rastelli 87'

14 December 1997 12	Napoli	0–4	Parma	Naples
			Blomqvist 18'; D. Baggio 53'; Crespo 65, 73'	Stadium: San Paolo

21 December 1997 13	Sampdoria	6–3	Napoli	Genoa
	Boghossian 35'; Montella 42' (pen.) 61' 90' (pen.); Klinsmann 73'; Laigle 76'		Bellucci 15'; Protti 70'; Rossitto 78'	Stadium: Luigi Ferraris

04 January 1998 14	Napoli	1–2	Milan	Naples
	Bellucci 75'		Ganz 52'; Leonardo 71'	Stadium: San Paolo

11 January 1998 15	Udinese	1–1	Napoli	Udine
	Crasson 90 + 2' (o.g.)		Bellucci 27'

18 January 1998 16	Napoli	0–3	Brescia	Naples
			Pirlo 13'; Koźmiński 53'; Diana 90 + 3'	Stadium: San Paolo

25 January 1998 17	Bari	2–0	Napoli	Bari
	Marcolini 74'; Sala 90 + 3'

01 February 1998 18	Napoli	0–0	Lazio	Naples
				Stadium: San Paolo

08 February 1998 19	Empoli	5–0	Napoli	Empoli
	C. Esposito 24'; Cappellini 37'; Pane 50'; Florijančič 70, 75'

11 February 1998 20	Napoli	2–0	Vicenza	Naples
	Turrini 43' (pen.); Stojak 47'			Stadium: San Paolo

15 February 1998 21	Atalanta	1–0	Napoli	Atalanta
	Lucarelli 16'

22 February 1998 22	Napoli	0–2	Roma	Naples
			Totti 54'; Di Biagio 62'	Stadium: San Paolo

28 February 1998 23	Inter Milan	2–0	Napoli	Milan
	Zamorano 63'; Ronaldo 73' (pen.)			Stadium: Giuseppe Meazza

08 March 1998 24	Napoli	0–0	Bologna	Naples
				Stadium: San Paolo

14 March 1998 25	Juventus	2–2	Napoli	Turin
	Del Piero 46'; Zalayeta 75'		Turrini 69'; Protti 90 + 2'	Stadium: delle Alpi

22 March 1998 26	Napoli	2–4	Lecce	Naples
	Protti 35' (pen.); Altomare 73'		Casale 2'; Palmieri 29'; Ayala 75' (o.g.); Atelkin 90 + 3'	Stadium: San Paolo

29 March 1998 27	Fiorentina	4–0	Napoli	Florence
	Batistuta 40, 67'; Robbiati 80'; Edmundo 86'			Stadium: Artemio Franchi

05 April 1998 28	Napoli	1–2	Piacenza	Naples
	Bellucci 51'		Scienza 34'; Dionigi 84' (pen.)	Stadium: San Paolo

11 April 1998 29	Parma	3–1	Napoli	Parma
	Crespo 3, 86'; Apolloni 76'		Bellucci 69'	Stadium: Il Tardini

19 April 1998 30	Napoli	0–2	Sampdoria	Naples
			Crasson 33' (o.g.); Laigle 87'	Stadium: San Paolo

26 April 1998 31	Milan	0–0	Napoli	Milan
				Stadium: San Siro

03 May 1998 32	Napoli	1–3	Udinese	Naples
	Turrini 12' (pen.)		Poggi 4'; Bierhoff 45, 87'	Stadium: San Paolo

10 May 1998 33	Brescia	2–1	Napoli	Brescia
	Adani 57'; Neri 81'		Bellucci 56'

16 May 1998 34	Napoli	2–2	Bari	Naples
	Bellucci 13'; Stojak 48'		Guerrero 6'; Volpi 37'	Stadium: San Paolo

== Statistics ==
=== Players statistics ===
No.	Pos	Nat	Player	Total		Serie A		Coppa	
No.	Pos	Nat	Player	Apps	Goals	Apps	Goals	Apps	Goals
1	GK	(Italy) ITA	Giuseppe Taglialatela	31	-63	27+1	-55	3	-8
6	DF	(Argentina) ARG	Roberto Ayala	30	0	28	0	2	0
15	DF	(Italy) ITA	Francesco Baldini	33	0	30	0	3	0
22	DF	(Belgium) BEL	Bertrand Crasson	24	0	19+3	0	2	0
14	MF	(Italy) ITA	Luca Altomare	26	2	16+8	2	2	0
8	MF	(Italy) ITA	Raffaele Longo	33	0	24+5	0	4	0
7	MF	(Italy) ITA	Francesco Turrini	30	5	26+1	5	3	0
18	MF	(Italy) ITA	Roberto Goretti	30	1	25+1	1	4	0
4	MF	(Italy) ITA	Fabio Rossitto	32	2	28	1	4	1
9	FW	(Italy) ITA	Claudio Bellucci	31	13	27	10	4	3
10	FW	(Italy) ITA	Igor Protti	31	6	24+3	4	4	2
12	GK	(Italy) ITA	Raffaele Di Fusco	8	-19	5+2	-19	1	0
5	DF	(Italy) ITA	Mauro Facci	20	0	17	0	3	0
3	DF	(Italy) ITA	Raffaele Sergio	15	0	11+1	0	3	0
16	DF	(Italy) ITA	Luigi Malafronte	10	0	9+1	0		
30	MF	(Croatia) CRO	Aljoša Asanović	15	0	8+7	0		
31	FW	(Federal Republic of Yugoslavia) YUG	Damir Stojak	13	2	8+5	2		
13	DF	(Italy) ITA	Luigi Panarelli	18	0	6+11	0	1	0
19	MF	(Italy) ITA	Gennaro Scarlato	21	0	6+13	0	2	0
28	MF	(Italy) ITA	Massimiliano Allegri	7	0	6+1	0		
25	MF	(France) FRA	Reynald Pedros	4	0	1+2	0	1	0
23	GK	(Italy) ITA	Ferdinando Coppola	1	-2	1	-2		
29	FW	(Italy) ITA	Salvatore Bruno	3	0	1+2	0		
17	MF	(Italy) ITA	Angelo Cimadomo	2	0	0+2	0		
33	DF	(Italy) ITA	Guglielmo Stendardo	1	0	0+1	0		
32	DF	(Italy) ITA	Emanuele Troise	0	0	0	0		
Players transferred out during the season
24	DF	(Italy) ITA	Mirko Conte	10	0	8+1	0	1	0
27	MF	(Italy) ITA	Giuseppe Giannini	5	1	4	0	1	1
26	MF	(Italy) ITA	Marco Zamboni	5	0	3+1	0	1	0
11	FW	(Argentina) ARG	José Luis Calderón	7	0	2+4	0	1	0
2	DF	(France) FRA	William Prunier	4	0	2+1	0	1	0
20	MF	(Italy) ITA	Massimiliano Esposito	6	0	1+3	0	2	0
21	DF	(Italy) ITA	Alessandro Sbrizzo	5	0	0+2	0	3	0

- Source: http://calcio-seriea.net/allenatori_squadra/1997/1135/

== Sources ==
- RSSSF - Italy 1997/98
