= 1995–96 AS Bari season =

Associazione Sportiva Bari
1995-96 season
- Chairman: Vincenzo Matarrese
- Manager: Giuseppe Materazzi (until 4 December 1995); Eugenio Fascetti
- Stadium: San Nicola
- Serie A: 15th (relegated to 1996-97 Serie B)
- Coppa Italia: Second round
- Top goalscorer: Igor Protti (24)
- Average home league attendance: 26,322
Home colours	Away colours	Third colours

During the 1995–96 season 'Associazione Sportiva Bari competed in Serie A and Coppa Italia.

== Summary ==
During the summer before 1995-96 Serie A, the head office “biancorossa” sold two young stars, Emiliano Bigica and Lorenzo Amoruso, to Fiorentina for almost 8 million dollars. Regarding these operations club managing director Carlo Regalia states that was for balancing the budget. Also transferred out Sandro Tovalieri, to Serie A newcomers Atalanta B.C.

Arrivals to the “pugliese” club were Swedish forward Kennet Andersson, known as striker with 5 goals scored in 1994 FIFA World Cup (Sweden reached the third place in that competition), and Abel Xavier, right back from Benfica and Portugal international.

In 1995-96 Coppa Italia the “galletti” are defeated in second round by newcomer trainer Carlo Ancelotti and his squad Reggiana, due to a 2–0 in Emilia-Romagna.

In League, after obtained only eight points during the first seven rounds, included a 1–0 victory over Milan of Fabio Capello, the biancorossi were defeated five times row causing the firing between 12ª and 13ª round of manager Giuseppe Materazzi; arriving to the bench was Eugenio Fascetti. The debut of the new head coach was a shocking loss of 7–1 in Cremona, with Portuguese Abel Xavier playing as sweeper, delivered a bad performance. Then, a month of irregular results, with 8 points won in 4 matches included a 4–1 victory against Internazionale and a draw 1–1 in Torino against incumbent champions Juventus on round 17 closing the first part of the campaign in 16th place, 1 point behind Torino and in danger to compete in 1996-97 Serie B.

During Autumn the club bought Swedish midfielder Klas Ingesson from Sheffield Wednesday and young defender Roberto Ripa from Udinese Calcio.

In the next 8 matches, the team drew 4 of them included Torino and Piacenza, direct rivals for salvation, and lost the other games. In the 26th and 27th round, Bari won in Bergamo against Atalanta and won at home against Padova Calcio. After this, also in stadio San Nicola, the "pugliesi" are defeated 1–2 by A.S. Roma between controversial decisions by referee Robert Boggi against Bari. The irregular results continued; the team was relegated to 1996-97 Serie B after a defeat 3–0 in Stadio Giuseppe Meazza against Inter. The squad of Fascetti drew 2–2 with Juventus in the last game of the season closing in 16th place in the League table.

The campaign is the first in Serie A in which a team was relegated to Serie B and the same time the “capocannoniere” topscorer of the tournament played in that squad, center forward Igor Protti scored 24 goals for Bari sharing the individual trophy with SS Lazio striker Giuseppe Signori, who scored more goals by penalties. The other forward of Bari, Kennet Andersson, scored 12 goals and was crucial giving a lot of assists to Protti.

However, in a bizarre season with a powerful offensive duo, the defense was crucial to relegation with 71 goals allowed in 34 matches, only surpassed by last placed Padova (79).

== Squad ==
Note: Flags indicate national team as defined under FIFA eligibility rules; some limited exceptions apply. Players may hold more than one non-FIFA nationality.

No.	Pos.	Nation	Player
1	GK	ITA	Alberto Fontana
2	DF	ITA	Marcello Montanari
3	DF	ITA	Paolo Annoni
4	MF	ITA	Michele Andrisani
5	MF	ITA	Gian Paolo Manighetti
6	MF	POR	Abel Xavier
7	MF	ITA	Carmine Gautieri
8	MF	ITA	Francesco Pedone
9	MF	ITA	Roberto Cau
10	FW	ITA	Igor Protti (Captain)
11	FW	ITA	Pietro Parente
12	GK	ITA	Luca Gentili
13	FW	ITA	Nicola Ventola
14	DF	ITA	Emanuele Brioschi
15	MF	BRA	Gérson

No.	Pos.	Nation	Player
16	MF	ITA	Fabrizio Ficini
17	FW	COL	Miguel Ángel Guerrero
18	DF	ITA	Amedeo Mangone
19	FW	SWE	Kennet Andersson
20	DF	ITA	Gianluca Ricci
21	MF	ITA	Ovidio Gorlani
22	GK	ITA	Giuseppe Alberga
23	DF	ITA	Luigi Sala
24	DF	ITA	Roberto Ripa
25	MF	SWE	Klas Ingesson
26	GK	ITA	Claudio Bigica
27	GK	ITA	Manuel Pierangeli
—	DF	ITA	Nicola Legrottaglie
—	DF	ITA	Carlo Tafuni
—	MF	ITA	Antonio Bellavista

=== Transfers ===
In
Pos.	Name	from	Type
FW	Kennet Andersson	Caen	
DF	Abel Xavier	Benfica	loan (U$0,350 million)
GK	Luca Gentili	Barletta	loan ended
DF	Luigi Sala	Como Calcio	
GK	Michele Andrisani	Palazzolo	loan ended
MF	Fabrizio Ficini	Empoli Calcio	
MF	Pietro Parente	Como Calcio	loan ended

Out
Pos.	Name	To	Type
DF	Lorenzo Amoruso	Fiorentina	
DF	Luciano Civero	Nola	
DF	Carlo Sassarini	Massese	loan
MF	Angelo Alessio	Cosenza	
MF	Onofrio Barone	Hellas Verona	
MF	Emiliano Bigica	Fiorentina	
FW	Sandro Tovalieri	Atalanta B.C.	

==== Autumn ====
In
Pos.	Name	from	Type
DF	Roberto Ripa	Udinese Calcio	
MF	Klas Ingesson	Sheffield Wednesday	

Out
Pos.	Name	To	Type
FW	Roberto Cau	Novara	loan
FW	Miguel Ángel Guerrero	Mérida	loan

== Competitions ==
=== Serie A ===
==== League table ====
Pos	Team	Pld	W	D	L	GF	GA	GD	Pts	Qualification or relegation
13	Atalanta	34	11	6	17	38	50	−12	39	
14	Piacenza	34	9	10	15	31	48	−17	37	
15	Bari (R)	34	8	8	18	49	71	−22	32	Relegation to Serie B
16	Torino (R)	34	6	11	17	28	46	−18	29	Relegation to Serie B
17	Cremonese (R)	34	5	12	17	37	57	−20	27	Relegation to Serie B

Source: 1995–96 Serie A, RSSSF.com, Soccerway
Rules for classification: 1) Points; 2) Head-to-head points; 3) Head-to-head goal difference; 4) Goal difference; 5) Goals scored; 6) Draw. (Note: Head-to-head record is used only after all the matches between the teams in question have been played).
(R) Relegated

==== Results by round ====
Round	1	2	3	4	5	6	7	8	9	10	11	12	13	14	15	16	17	18	19	20	21	22	23	24	25	26	27	28	29	30	31	32	33	34
Ground	A	H	A	H	A	H	A	A	H	A	H	A	H	H	A	H	A	H	A	H	A	H	A	H	H	H	A	H	A	A	A	H	A	H
Result	D	L	D	L	W	L	W	L	L	L	L	L	L	D	W	W	D	L	D	L	D	L	L	L	D	W	L	L	W	W	L	W	L	D
Position	7	13	13	15	12	16	12	14	14	16	16	16	17	16	16	16	15	16	17	17	17	17	17	17	17	16	17	17	15	15	15	15	15	15

Source: Competitive matches
A = Away; H = Home; W = Win; D = Draw; L = Loss; = 1996–97 UEFA Champions League; = 1996–97 UEFA Cup; = 1996–97 Serie B

==== Matches ====
27 August 1995 1	Bari	1–1	Napoli	Bari
	Protti 3'	Report	86' (pen.)André Cruz	Stadium: San Nicola; Referee: Gianni Beschin

10 September 1995 2	Torino	3–1	Bari	Turin
	Ricci 23' (o.g.); Sukur 67'; Rizzitelli 86' (pen.)	Report	43' Protti	Stadium: Delle Alpi; Referee: Daniele TOMBOLINI

17 September 1995 3	Bari	3–3	Lazio	Bari
	Protti 8'; Protti 14'; Protti 49'	Report	43' Winter; 57' Casiraghi; 59' (pen.) Signori	Stadium: San Nicola; Referee: Stefano Braschi

24 September 1995 4	Piacenza	3–2	Bari	Piacenza
	Caccia 43'; Caccia 48'; Piovani 51'	Report	84' Protti; 90' Pedone; Manighetti (red card) 73'	Stadium: Stadio Galleana; Referee: Stefano Farina

1 October 1995 5	Bari	1–0	Milan	Bari
	Gautieri 46'	Report		Stadium: San Nicola; Referee: Loris Stafoggia

15 October 1995 6	Vicenza	2–0	Bari	Vicenza
	Otero 24'; Otero 43'	Report		Stadium: Stadio Romeo Menti; Referee: Gennaro Borriello

22 October 1995 7	Bari	3–0	Cagliari	Bari
	Andersson 55'; Protti 62'; Guerrero 83'	Report		Stadium: San Nicola; Referee: Virginio Quartuccio

29 October 1995 8	Fiorentina	3–2	Bari	Florence
	Anselmo ROBBIATI 43'; Rui Costa 71'; Batistuta 86'	Report	79' Annoni; 90' Protti	Stadium: Artemio Franchi; Referee: Marcello CARDONA

5 November 1995 9	Bari	1–3	Atalanta	Bari
	40' Andersson	Report	Pisani 9'; Tovalieri 13'; Tovalieri 23'	Stadium: San Nicola; Referee: Giancarlo Lana

19 November 1995 10	Padova	3–0	Bari	Padua
	Amoruso 4'; Ciocci 53'; Amoruso 86'	Report	(red card) 78' Protti	Stadium: Stadio Euganeo; Referee: Emilio Pellegrino

26 November 1995 11	Roma	2–1	Bari	Rome
	Fonseca 69'; Totti 72'	Report	88' Pedone	Stadium: Stadio Olimpico

3 December 1995 12	Bari	1–3	Sampdoria	Bari
	Protti 48' (pen.)	Report	28' Chiesa; 37' Chiesa; 77' Chiesa	Stadium: della Vittoria

10 December 1995 13	U.S. Cremonese	7–1	Bari	Cremona
	9' (o.g.) Brioschi E. 26' Gualco; 39' Florijancic; 42' Perovic; 45' Aloisi J. 60' Perovic; 73' Tentoni A.	Report	22' Andersson

17 December 1995 14	Bari	1–1	Parma	Bari
	Protti 45' (pen.)	Report	87' Melli	Stadium: Stadio della Vittoria

23 December 1995 15	Udinese	1–2	Bari	Udine
	Bia 18' (pen.)	Report	57' Andersson; 70' Andersson

7 January 1996 16	Bari	4–1	Inter	Bari
	Sala 31'; Protti 73'; Ingesson 79'; Protti 90'	Report	15' Roberto Carlos	Stadium: San Nicola

14 January 1996 17	Juventus	1–1	Bari	Turin
	Ravanelli 40' (pen.)	Report	9' Protti	Stadium: Delle Alpi

21 January 1996 18	Napoli	1–0	Bari	Naples
	Di Napoli 7'	Report		Stadium: San Paolo

28 January 1996 19	Bari	2–2	Torino	Bari
	9' Andersson; 26' Protti	Report	Rizzitelli 8'; Karic 71'	Stadium: San Nicola

4 February 1996 20	Lazio	4–3	Bari	Rome
	Signori 20' (pen.); Signori 24' (pen.); Signori 30'; Boksic 79'	Report	9' (pen.) Protti; 63' Andersson; 81' (pen.) Protti	Stadium: Stadio Olimpico

11 February 1996 21	Bari	0–0	Piacenza	Bari
		Report		Stadium: Stadio San Nicola

18 February 1996 22	Milan	3–2	Bari	Milan
	Simone 7'; Simone 28' (pen.); Weah 88'	Report	21' Pedone; 49' Sala	Stadium: Stadio San Siro

25 February 1996 23	Bari	0–2	Vicenza	Bari
		Report	65' Otero; 90' Lopez	Stadium: San Nicola

3 March 1996 24	Cagliari	4–2	Bari	Cagliari
	Oliveira 17'; Lantignotti 30'; Oliveira 88' (pen.); Oliveira 90'	Report	7' Andersson; 21' (pen.) Protti	Stadium: Stadio Sant'Elia

10 March 1996 25	Bari	1–1	Fiorentina	Bari
	Andersson 41'	Report	86' (pen.) Baiano	Stadium: San Nicola

24 March 1996 27	Bari	2–1	Padova	Bari
	Ripa 31'; Protti 37'	Report	53' Gabrieli	Stadium: San Nicola

31 March 1996 28	Bari	1–2	Roma	Bari
	Parente 2'	Report	51' Totti; Statuto 64'	Stadium: San Nicola

6 April 1996 29	Sampdoria	2–0	Bari	Genoa
	Maniero 71'	Report	84' Mancini R.	Stadium: Luigi Ferraris

10 April 1996 26	Atalanta	1–2	Bari	Bergamo
	Vieri 21' (pen.) (B)	Report	70' Protti; 77' Protti	Stadium: Stadio Atleti Azzurri d'Italia

14 April 1996 30	Bari	2–1	Cremonese	Bari
	Protti 56'; Protti 73'	Report	39' Perovic	Stadium: Stadio San Nicola

21 April 1996 31	Parma	3–1	Bari	Parma
	Dino Baggio 8'; Inzaghi 26'; Piro 90'	Report	12' Andersson	Stadium: Il Tardini

28 April 1996 32	Bari	4–2	Udinese	Bari
	Andersson 3'; Parente 14'; Parente 44'; Andersson 63'	Report	7' Marino F. 84' Bierhoff	Stadium: San Nicola

5 May 1996 33	Inter	3–0	Bari	Milan
	Ince 34'; Branca 38'; Ganz 52'; Ganz	Report		Stadium: Giuseppe Meazza

12 May 1996 34	Bari	2–2	Juventus	Bari
	Protti 45'; Protti 85'	Report	20' (o.g.) Montanari; 69' Vialli	Stadium: Stadio San Nicola

== Statistics ==
=== Players Statistics ===
No.	Pos	Nat	Player	Total		1995-96 Serie A		1995-96 Coppa Italia	
No.	Pos	Nat	Player	Apps	Goals	Apps	Goals	Apps	Goals
1	GK	(Italy) ITA	Fontana	32	-63	32	-63	0	0
2	DF	(Italy) ITA	Montanari	28	0	23+4	0	1	0
18	DF	(Italy) ITA	Mangone	31	0	25+5	0	1	0
23	DF	(Italy) ITA	Sala	27	2	25+1	2	1	0
5	MF	(Italy) ITA	Manighetti	27	0	23+3	0	1	0
7	MF	(Italy) ITA	Gautieri	30	1	26+3	1	1	0
25	MF	(Sweden) SWE	Ingesson	24	1	23+1	1		
8	MF	(Italy) ITA	Pedone	33	3	31+1	3	1	0
15	MF	(Brazil) BRA	Gérson	26	0	22+3	0	0+1	0
10	FW	(Italy) ITA	Protti	34	24	33	24	1	0
19	FW	(Sweden) SWE	Andersson	34	12	31+2	12	1	0
22	GK	(Italy) ITA	Alberga	3	-9	2	-7	1	-2
20	DF	(Italy) ITA	Ricci	23	0	19+3	0	1	0
11	FW	(Italy) ITA	Parente	27	3	17+9	3	0+1	0
24	DF	(Italy) ITA	Ripa	15	1	12+3	1		
3	DF	(Italy) ITA	Annoni	23	1	9+14	1	0	0
16	MF	(Italy) ITA	Ficini	22	0	8+13	0	1	0
6	MF	(Portugal) POR	Abel Xavier	8	0	8	0		
14	DF	(Italy) ITA	Brioschi	11	0	3+8	0		
17	FW	(Colombia) COL	Guerrero	9	1	1+7	1	0+1	0
13	FW	(Italy) ITA	Ventola	7	0	1+6	0		
4	MF	(Italy) ITA	Andrisani	1	0	0+1	0		
12	GK	(Italy) ITA	Gentili	1	-1	0+1	-1		
21	MF	(Italy) ITA	Gorlani	0	0	0	0		
26	GK	(Italy) ITA	Bigica	0	0	0	0		
27	GK	(Italy) ITA	Pierangeli	0	0	0	0		
	DF	(Italy) ITA	Legrottaglie	0	0	0	0		
	DF	(Italy) ITA	Tafuni	0	0	0	0		
	MF	(Italy) ITA	Bellavista	0	0	0	0		
9	MF	(Italy) ITA	Cau	0	0	0	0		

- Source: http://calcio-seriea.net/presenze/1995/1090/

== Bibliography ==
- Gianni Antonucci. 1908-1998 90 Bari (in Italian). Uniongrafica Corcelli, Bari,1998.
- Gianni Antonucci. Bari e il Bari (in Italian). Mario Adda Editore, 2008.
