= 2003–04 Ancona Calcio season =

Ancona
2003–04 season
- Chairman: Ermanno Pieroni
- Manager: Leonardo Menichini (until 29 September); Nedo Sonetti (from 29 September, until 28 January); Giovanni Galeone (from 28 January)
- Stadium: Stadio del Conero
- Serie A: 18th (Relegated)
- Coppa Italia: First round
- Top goalscorer: League: Cristian Bucchi (5); All: Cristian Bucchi (5)
- Highest home attendance: 23,306 vs. Juventus (18 October 2003)
- Lowest home attendance: 9,348 vs. Chievo (25 April 2004)
- Average home league attendance: 13,235

During the 2003–04 Italian football season, Ancona Calcio competed in the Serie A.

== Season summary ==
Ancona never won a match between September and April, recording 21 losses and seven draws: losing with Sampdoria in early spring, the side collected the certain relegation. In the whole league, it obtained just 13 points finishing last in table.

== Kit ==
Ancona's kit was manufactured by French sports retailer Le Coq Sportif and sponsored by Banca Marche.

== Players ==
Squad at the end of the season Note: Flags indicate national team as defined under FIFA eligibility rules; some limited exceptions apply. Players may hold more than one non-FIFA nationality.

No.	Pos.	Nation	Player
1	GK	SWE	Magnus Hedman (on loan from Celtic)
2	DF	SCG	Dražen Bolić
4	MF	SWE	Daniel Andersson (on loan from Venezia)
5	DF	ITA	Stefano Lombardi
6	DF	ITA	Mauro Milanese
7	MF	ITA	Daniele Berretta
8	MF	ITA	Dino Baggio (on loan from Lazio)
9	FW	BRA	Mário Jardel (on loan from Bolton Wanderers)
11	MF	ESP	Luis Helguera (on loan Udinese)
12	GK	ITA	Marco Cerioni
13	MF	ITA	Giampiero Maini
14	DF	ITA	Marco Esposito
15	FW	CRO	Milan Rapaić
16	MF	ITA	Matteo Rossi
17	FW	ARG	Fabricio Lenci
18	MF	ITA	Roberto Goretti
19	FW	MKD	Goran Pandev (on loan from Inter Milan)
21	FW	ITA	Corrado Grabbi

No.	Pos.	Nation	Player
23	FW	ITA	Maurizio Ganz
24	MF	ITA	Luigi Sartor (on loan from Roma)
25	FW	ITA	Elia Donzelli
26	MF	FRA	Bruce Dombolo
27	FW	ITA	Cristian Bucchi
28	DF	ARG	Luciano Zavagno
29	MF	ITA	Vincenzo Sommese
30	GK	ITA	Gabriele Sollitto
31	GK	ITA	Sergio Marcon
32	DF	ITA	Massimiliano Giacobbo
34	MF	ITA	Giovanni Goracci
35	MF	ITA	Daniele Fortunato
37	MF	ITA	Andrea De Falco
38	FW	ITA	Andrea Cennini
39	DF	ITA	Marco Di Porzio
40	MF	ITA	Andrea Di Tora
42	DF	ITA	Sean Sogliano
79	DF	ITA	Daniele Daino

=== Left club during season ===
Note: Flags indicate national team as defined under FIFA eligibility rules; some limited exceptions apply. Players may hold more than one non-FIFA nationality.

No.	Pos.	Nation	Player
1	GK	ITA	Alessio Scarpi (to Genoa)
3	DF	BRA	Fábio Bilica (to Goiás)
8	DF	ITA	Salvatore Russo (to Salernitana)
9	FW	ITA	Paolo Poggi (to Venezia)
10	MF	DEN	Mads Jørgensen (to Stabæk)
11	DF	ITA	Dario Baccin (on loan to Ascoli)
12	GK	ITA	Marco Roccati (to Fiorentina)
15	MF	ITA	Damiano Moscardi (on loan to Vicenza)
16	MF	ITA	Davide Carrus (to Fiorentina)
17	MF	ITA	Daniele Degano (to Parma)

No.	Pos.	Nation	Player
18	MF	ITA	Eusebio Di Francesco (to Perugia)
20	DF	ITA	Andrea Sussi (to Bologna)
21	DF	ITA	William Viali (loan return to Palermo)
22	DF	ITA	Pasquale Luiso (to Catanzaro)
24	MF	SCG	Marko Perović (to Napoli)
25	DF	ITA	Roberto Maltagliati (to Cagliari)
26	FW	ITA	Salvatore Bruno (loan return to Chievo Verona)
27	FW	ITA	Dario Hübner (to Perugia Calcio)
33	MF	ITA	Pietro Parente (to Venezia)
84	DF	ITA	Alessandro Potenza (loan return to Inter Milan)

== Serie A ==
Pos	Team	Pld	W	D	L	GF	GA	GD	Pts	Qualification or relegation
14	Siena	34	8	10	16	41	54	−13	34 (Note: Reggina finished ahead of Siena on head-to-head points: Reggina 2–1 Siena, Siena 0–0 Reggina.)	
15	Perugia (R)	34	6	14	14	44	56	−12	32	Relegation play-off
16	Modena (R)	34	6	12	16	27	46	−19	30 (Note: Modena finished ahead of Empoli on head-to-head points: Empoli 0–3 Modena, Modena 1–1 Empoli.)	Relegation to Serie B
17	Empoli (R)	34	7	9	18	26	54	−28	30	Relegation to Serie B
18	Ancona (Note: Ancona was denied entry to the 2004–05 Serie B season, having entered administration. It was later admitted to the Lega Professionisti Serie C after bankruptcy.) (R, E, R)	34	2	7	25	21	70	−49	13	Phoenix in Serie C2

Source: Almanacco Illustrato del Calcio – La Storia 1898-2004, Panini Edizioni, Modena, September 2005
Rules for classification: 1) points; 2) tiebreaker for relevant positions 3) head-to-head points and goal difference; 4) head-to-head goals scored; 5) goal difference; 6) number of goals scored.
(E) Eliminated; (R) Relegated
