= 2002–03 Bologna FC 1909 season =

Bologna
2002–03 season
- Chairman: Renato Cipollini
- Manager: Francesco Guidolin
- Stadium: Stadio Renato Dall'Ara
- Serie A: 11th
- Coppa Italia: Quarter-finals
- Top goalscorer: League: Giuseppe Signori (12); All: Giuseppe Signori (16)
Home colours	Away colours	Third colours

During the 2002–03 Italian football season, Bologna F.C. 1909 competed in the Serie A.

== Season summary ==
Bologna F.C. 1909 finished the season in 11th position in the Serie A table. In other competitions, Bologna reached the quarter-finals of the Coppa Italia.

Giuseppe Signori was the top scorer for Bologna with 12 goals in all competitions.

== Squad ==
Note: Flags indicate national team as defined under FIFA eligibility rules; some limited exceptions apply. Players may hold more than one non-FIFA nationality.

No.	Pos.	Nation	Player
1	GK	ITA	Gianluca Pagliuca
2	DF	ITA	Cristian Zaccardo
3	DF	ITA	Paolo Vanoli
4	MF	ITA	Renato Olive
5	DF	ITA	Marcello Castellini
6	DF	ITA	Alessandro Gamberini
6	DF	ITA	Marco Zanchi
7	MF	ITA	Carlo Nervo
8	MF	ITA	Leonardo Colucci
9	FW	ARG	Julio Cruz
10	FW	ITA	Giuseppe Signori (Captain)
11	FW	ITA	Claudio Bellucci
12	GK	ITA	Ferdinando Coppola
13	DF	ITA	Fabio Macellari
14	MF	ITA	Andrea Ardito

No.	Pos.	Nation	Player
15	DF	SCG	Vlado Šmit
16	MF	ITA	Emiliano Salvetti
17	DF	ITA	Claudio Terzi
18	FW	ITA	Giacomo Cipriani
19	DF	ITA	Giulio Falcone
20	MF	ITA	Tomas Locatelli
21	DF	ITA	Emanuele Brioschi
22	GK	ITA	Andrea Pansera
23	MF	ITA	Roberto Goretti
23	DF	CIV	Steve Gohouri
24	MF	ITA	Christian Amoroso
30	MF	ITA	Alessandro Frara
31	MF	FRA	Mourad Meghni
32	FW	ITA	Luigi Della Rocca
33	DF	ITA	Michele Paramatti

=== Transfers ===
In
Pos.	Name	from	Type
GK	Andrea Pansera	AlbinoLeffe	
DF	Fabio Macellari	Inter	co-ownership
DF	Michele Paramatti	Juventus	definitivo (€0 )
DF	Marco Zanchi	Juventus	
MF	Christian Amoroso	Fiorentina	free
MF	Andrea Ardito	Como Calcio	
MF	Leonardo Colucci	Hellas Verona	
MF	Alessandro Frara	Juventus	loan
MF	Emiliano Salvetti	Juventus	loan

Out
Pos.	Name	To	Type
DF	Salvatore Fresi	Juventus	
MF	Matteo Brighi	Juventus	loan ended
MF	Lamberto Zauli	Palermo F.C.	
MF	Fabio Pecchia	Como Calcio	loan
DF	Massimo Tarantino	Como Calcio	
DF	Pierre Womé	Fulham F.C.	loan
MF	Andrea Ardito	A.C. Siena	loan
DF	Alessandro Gamberini	Chievo Verona	loan
MF	Fabio Firmani	Chievo Verona	loan ended
FW	Björn Runström	Chievo Verona	0,5 million €

==== Winter ====
In
Pos.	Name	from	Type
DF	Steve Gohouri	Yverdon	loan
DF	Paolo Vanoli		free

Out
Pos.	Name	To	Type
DF	Emanuele Brioschi	Cosenza	
MF	Roberto Goretti	A.C. Reggiana	
DF	Fabio Macellari		released

== Competitions ==
=== Serie A ===
==== League table ====
Pos	Team	Pld	W	D	L	GF	GA	GD	Pts	Qualification or relegation
9	Brescia	34	9	15	10	36	38	−2	42 (Note: Brescia finished ahead of Perugia on head-to-head points: Brescia 3–1 Perugia, Perugia 0–0 Brescia.)	Qualification to Intertoto Cup second round
10	Perugia (Note: Perugia gained entry to the 2003 UEFA Intertoto Cup after Chievo renounced; then they qualified to the 2003–04 UEFA Cup First round.)	34	10	12	12	40	48	−8	42	Qualification to Intertoto Cup third round
11	Bologna	34	10	11	13	39	47	−8	41	
12	Modena	34	9	11	14	30	48	−18	38 (Note: Modena finished ahead of Empoli, Atalanta and Reggina on head-to-head points: Modena: 10 pts, Empoli: 9 pts, Atalanta: 7 pts, Reggina: 5 pts.)	
13	Empoli	34	9	11	14	36	46	−10	38	

Source: 2002–03 Serie A, Soccerway
Rules for classification: 1) Points; 2) Head-to-head points; 3) Head-to-head goal difference; 4) Goal difference; 5) Goals scored; 6) Draw. (Note: Head-to-head record is used only after all the matches between the teams in question have been played).

==== Results by round ====
Round	1	2	3	4	5	6	7	8	9	10	11	12	13	14	15	16	17	18	19	20	21	22	23	24	25	26	27	28	29	30	31	32	33	34
Ground	A	H	A	H	A	H	A	A	H	H	A	H	A	H	A	H	A	H	A	H	A	H	A	H	H	A	A	H	A	H	A	H	A	H
Result	W	D	W	D	W	L	D	L	W	W	D	W	D	W	D	L	L	D	L	L	L	W	D	L	W	L	D	D	L	D	W	L	L	L
Position	1	5	2	3	3	4	5	7	6	5	6	5	5	4	6	6	6	7	8	8	9	8	8	8	8	8	8	9	10	10	9	9	9	11

Source: Competitive matches
A = Away; H = Home; W = Win; D = Draw; L = Loss; = Leader, 2003-04 UEFA Champions League group stage; = 2003-04 UEFA Champions League group stage; = 2003-04 UEFA Champions League qualifying round; = 2003-04 UEFA Cup; = 2003 UEFA Intertoto Cup; = 2003-04 Serie B

==== Matches ====
6 November 2002 1	Torino	2–1	Bologna	Turin
	Conticchio 4'; Castellini 88'	Report	34' (pen.) Vanoli	Stadium: Stadio delle Alpi; Attendance: 12,409; Referee: Massimiliano Saccani

14 September 2002 2	Bologna	2–1	Roma	Bologna
	Cruz 59', 91'	Report	44' (pen.) Batistuta	Stadium: Stadio Renato Dall'Ara; Attendance: 27,349; Referee: Roberto Rosetti

22 September 2002 3	Atalanta	2–2	Bologna	Bergamo
	Doni 18', 51' (pen.)	Report	13' Locatelli; 77' (pen.) Bellucci	Stadium: Stadio Atleti Azzurri d'Italia; Attendance: 13,720; Referee: Alfredo Trentalange

29 September 2002 4	Bologna	1–0	Piacenza	Bologna
	Della Rocca 65'	Report		Stadium: Stadio Renato Dall'Ara; Attendance: 20,548; Referee: Massimo De Santis

6 October 2002 5	Empoli	0–0	Bologna	Empoli
		Report		Stadium: Stadio Carlo Castellani; Attendance: 6,559; Referee: Emidio Morganti

20 October 2002 6	Bologna	3–0	Brescia	Bologna
	Locatelli 19'; Cruz 76' (pen.), 90'	Report		Stadium: Stadio Renato Dall'Ara; Attendance: 23,173; Referee: Alfredo Trentalange

27 October 2002 7	Internazionale	2–0	Bologna	Milan
	Materazzi 67'; Vieri 92'	Report		Stadium: Stadio Giuseppe Meazza; Attendance: 65,408; Referee: Fiorenzo Treossi

2 November 2002 8	Udinese	0–0	Bologna	Udine
		Report		Stadium: Stadio Friuli; Attendance: 15,850; Referee: Pasquale Rodomonti

10 November 2002 9	Bologna	1–0	Como	Bologna
	Signori 74' (pen.)	Report		Stadium: Stadio Renato Dall'Ara; Attendance: 20,193; Referee: Alfredo Trentalange

17 November 2002 10	Bologna	2–1	Perugia	Bologna
	Cruz 30'; Signori 37'	Report	45' Caracciolo	Stadium: Stadio Renato Dall'Ara; Attendance: 20,112; Referee: Alberto Castellani

23 November 2002 11	Juventus	1–1	Bologna	Turin
	Iuliano 86'	Report	66' (pen.) Signori	Stadium: Stadio delle Alpi; Attendance: 36,544; Referee: Stefano Farina

1 December 2002 12	Bologna	3–0	Modena	Bologna
	Locatelli 56'; Cruz 80'; Amoroso 81'	Report		Stadium: Stadio Renato Dall'Ara; Attendance: 30,731; Referee: Roberto Rosetti

8 December 2002 13	Chievo	0–0	Bologna	Verona
		Report		Stadium: Stadio Marcantonio Bentegodi; Attendance: 13,680; Referee: Gianluca Paparesta

14 December 2002 14	Bologna	2–1	Parma	Bologna
	Cruz 42', 44'	Report	28' Adriano	Stadium: Stadio Renato Dall'Ara; Attendance: 21,717; Referee: Alfredo Trentalange

22 December 2002 15	Lazio	1–1	Bologna	Rome
	López 45+2'	Report	66' Zaccardo	Stadium: Stadio Olimpico; Attendance: 42,685; Referee: Roberto Rosetti

12 January 2003 16	Bologna	0–2	Milan	Bologna
		Report	51' Shevchenko; 78' Serginho	Stadium: Stadio Renato Dall'Ara; Attendance: 34,915; Referee: Alfredo Trentalange

18 January 2003 17	Reggina	1–0	Bologna	Reggio Calabria
	Savoldi 15'	Report		Stadium: Stadio Oreste Granillo; Attendance: 23,316; Referee: Roberto Rosetti

26 January 2003 18	Bologna	2–2	Torino	Bologna
	Signori 39' (pen.); Della Rocca 79'	Report	8' Vergassola; 65' Franco	Stadium: Stadio Renato Dall'Ara; Attendance: 20,543; Referee: Pierluigi Collina

1 February 2003 19	Roma	3–1	Bologna	Rome
	Montella 35'; Delvecchio 52'; Cassano 72'	Report	42' Signori	Stadium: Stadio Olimpico; Attendance: 52,795; Referee: Daniele Tombolini

9 February 2003 20	Bologna	2–3	Atalanta	Bologna
	Signori 69' (pen.), 72' (pen.)	Report	28', 49' Pinardi; 90+4' Rossini	Stadium: Stadio Renato Dall'Ara; Attendance: 19,802; Referee: Gianluca Paparesta

16 February 2003 21	Piacenza	3–1	Bologna	Piacenza
	Hübner 19' (pen.); Maresca 40'; De Cesare 62'	Report	84' Bellucci	Stadium: Stadio Leonardo Garilli; Attendance: 6,434; Referee: Stefano Farina

23 February 2003 22	Bologna	2–0	Empoli	Bologna
	Bellucci 14'; Vanoli 68'	Report		Stadium: Stadio Renato Dall'Ara; Attendance: 20,272; Referee: Domenico Messina

1 March 2003 23	Brescia	0–0	Bologna	Brescia
		Report		Stadium: Stadio Mario Rigamonti; Attendance: 14,007; Referee: Nicola Ayroldi

8 March 2003 24	Bologna	1–2	Internazionale	Bologna
	Cruz 23'	Report	9', 85' Recoba	Stadium: Stadio Renato Dall'Ara; Attendance: 31,433; Referee: Emilio Pellegrino

16 March 2003 25	Bologna	1–0	Udinese	Bologna
	Signori 9'	Report		Stadium: Stadio Renato Dall'Ara; Attendance: 21,822; Referee: Pasquale Rodomonti

23 March 2003 26	Como	5–1	Bologna	Como
	Caccia 18'; Amoruso 50', 90'; Pecchia 57'; Musić 86'	Report	53' Meghni	Stadium: Stadio Giuseppe Sinigaglia; Attendance: 6,355; Referee: Diego Preschern

6 April 2003 27	Perugia	1–1	Bologna	Perugia
	Vryzas 33'	Report	68' Signori	Stadium: Stadio Renato Curi; Attendance: 6,570; Referee: Stefano Cassarà

13 April 2003 28	Bologna	2–2	Juventus	Bologna
	Cruz 15'; Locatelli 74'	Report	87' Zambrotta; 90+5' Camoranesi	Stadium: Stadio Renato Dall'Ara; Attendance: 36,178; Referee: Gianluca Paparesta

19 April 2003 29	Modena	3–2	Bologna	Modena
	Kamara 13'; Sculli 73', 86'	Report	20', 46' Signori	Stadium: Stadio Alberto Braglia; Attendance: 15,518; Referee: Pierluigi Collina

27 April 2003 30	Bologna	1–1	Chievo	Bologna
	Signori 2'	Report	90+4' Della Morte	Stadium: Stadio Renato Dall'Ara; Attendance: 21,888; Referee: Roberto Rosetti

3 May 2003 31	Parma	1–2	Bologna	Parma
	Mutu 65'	Report	60' Paramatti; 67' Locatelli	Stadium: Stadio Ennio Tardini; Attendance: 15,485; Referee: Emilio Pellegrino

10 May 2003 32	Bologna	0–2	Lazio	Bologna
		Report	45' (pen.) Inzaghi; 59' Favalli	Stadium: Stadio Renato Dall'Ara; Attendance: 21,069; Referee: Gianluca Paparesta

17 May 2003 33	Milan	3–1	Bologna	Milan
	Pirlo 23' (pen.); Seedorf 51'; Inzaghi 66'	Report	68' Meghni	Stadium: Stadio Giuseppe Meazza; Attendance: 57,766; Referee: Matteo Trefoloni

25 May 2003 34	Bologna	0–2	Reggina	Bologna
		Report	13' Bonazzoli; 68' Di Michele	Stadium: Stadio Renato Dall'Ara; Attendance: 24,565; Referee: Salvatore Racalbuto

=== Coppa Italia ===
==== Eightfinals ====
5 December 2002	Vicenza	1–1	Bologna	Vicenza
	Schwoch 69'		57' Bellucci	Stadium: Stadio Romeo Menti; Referee: Stefano Cassarà

18 December 2002	Bologna	0–2	Vicenza	Bologna
			88' Sgrigna; 90' (pen.) Schwoch	Stadium: Renato Dall'Ara; Referee: Luca Palanca

=== UEFA Intertoto Cup ===
==== Quarterfinals ====
20 July 2002 1	Bologna (Italy)	2–0	(Belarus) BATE Borisov	Bologna
	Cruz 28'; Bellucci 79'			Stadium: Renato Dall'Ara; Attendance: 13 500; Referee: (Greece) Briakos

27 July 2002	BATE Borisov (Belarus)	0–0	(Italy) Bologna	Barysaŭ
				Stadium: Haradzki; Attendance: 5 200; Referee: (Spain) Medina Cantalejo

==== Semifinals ====
31 July 2002	Bologna (Italy)	5–1	(Czech Republic) Teplice	Bologna
	Nervo 2'; Signori 32', 35' (pen.); Zaccardo 68'; Olive 77'		65' Zelenka	Stadium: Stadio Renato Dall'Ara; Attendance: 15 174; Referee: (Israel) Koren

7 August 2002	Teplice (Czech Republic)	1–3	(Italy) Bologna	Teplice
	Grlic 89'		14' Nervo; 19', 38' Colucci	Stadium: Na Stínadlech; Attendance: 2 700; Referee: (Norway) Øvrebø

==== Finals ====
13 August 2002 1	Bologna (Italy)	2–2	(England) Fulham F.C.	Bologna
	Signori 53' (rig), 76' (rig)		64' Inamoto; 88' Legwinski	Stadium: Renato Dall'Ara; Attendance: 23 620; Referee: (Spain) Iturralde González

27 August 2002 2	Fulham F.C. (England)	3–1	(Italy) Bologna	London
	Inamoto 12', 46', 50'		33' Locatelli	Stadium: Loftus Road; Attendance: 15 000; Referee: (Czech Republic) Busacca

== Statistics ==
=== Players statistics ===
No.	Pos	Nat	Player	Total		Serie A		Coppa Italia		Intertoto Cup	
No.	Pos	Nat	Player	Apps	Goals	Apps	Goals	Apps	Goals	Apps	Goals
1	GK	(Italy) ITA	Pagliuca	40	-54	34	-47	0	0	6	-7
33	DF	(Italy) ITA	Paramatti	32	1	29+1	1	1	0	1	0
2	DF	(Italy) ITA	Zaccardo	40	2	24+8	1	2	0	6	1
8	DF	(Italy) ITA	Colucci	38	2	28+2	0	2	0	6	2
5	DF	(Italy) ITA	Castellini	38	0	31	0	1	0	6	0
4	MF	(Italy) ITA	Olive	35	1	27	0	2	0	6	1
7	MF	(Italy) ITA	Nervo	38	2	29+2	0	1	0	6	2
24	MF	(Italy) ITA	Amoroso	32	1	20+10	1	2	0		
20	MF	(Italy) ITA	Locatelli	32	6	19+7	5	2	0	4	1
9	FW	(Argentina) ARG	Cruz	35	11	28	10	1	0	6	1
10	FW	(Italy) ITA	Signori	28	16	19+5	12	0	0	4	4
12	GK	(Italy) ITA	Coppola	2	-3	0	0	2	-3		
11	FW	(Italy) ITA	Bellucci	36	5	19+9	3	2	1	6	1
6	MF	(Italy) ITA	Zanchi	20	0	18	0	2	0		
3	DF	(Italy) ITA	Vanoli	22	2	16+5	2	1	0		
19	DF	(Italy) ITA	Falcone	21	0	14+1	0	0	0	6	0
30	DF	(Italy) ITA	Frara	23	0	4+15	0	2	0	2	0
31	MF	(France) FRA	Meghni	12	2	3+5	2	1	0	3	0
15	DF	(Serbia and Montenegro) SCG	Smit	14	0	3+5	0	0	0	6	0
16		(Italy) ITA	Salvetti	9	0	2+5	0	2	0		
18		(Italy) ITA	Cipriani	2	0	2	0				
32		(Italy) ITA	Della Rocca	12	2	1+10	2	1	0		
23		(Italy) ITA	Goretti	5	0	0+1	0	0	0	4	0
17		(Italy) ITA	Terzi	4	0	0+3	0	1	0		
6		(Italy) ITA	Gamberini	4	0	0	0	0	0	4	0
14		(Italy) ITA	Ardito	1	0	0	0	0	0	1	0
21		(Italy) ITA	Brioschi	1	0	0	0	0	0	1	0
23	DF	(Ivory Coast) CIV	Gohouri	0	0	0	0				

- Source: http://calcio-seriea.net/allenatori_squadra/2002/1231/
