= 2000–01 SSC Napoli season =

Napoli
2000–01 season
- Chairman: Corrado Ferlaino
- Manager: Zdeněk Zeman; Emiliano Mondonico
- Serie A: 17th (relegated to Serie B)
- Coppa Italia: Second Round
- Top goalscorer: Nicola Amoruso (10)
Home colours	Away colours	Third colours

SSC Napoli returned to Serie A, following a couple of years in Serie B, where the club had rebuilt itself following the disastrous 1997–98 season, when it scored merely 14 points from 34 games.

Napoli was relegated once more, when a win against Fiorentina in the final round proved redundant due to all the other teams involved in the battle (to avoid relegation) also winning their matches; including a shocking win for Lecce against title-chasers Lazio. The investment in several new players came back to haunt Napoli when those players did not perform, causing bankruptcy three years later.

== Squad ==
=== Goalkeepers ===
- (Italy) Alberto Fontana
- (Italy) Francesco Mancini
- (Italy) Luca Mondini

=== Defenders ===
- (Nigeria) Rabiu Afolabi
- (Italy) Dario Baccin
- (Italy) Francesco Baldini
- (Italy) Antonio Bocchetti
- (Italy) Salvatore Fresi
- (Norway) Steinar Nilsen
- (Argentina) Facundo Quiroga
- (Morocco) Abdelilah Saber
- (Italy) Emanuele Troise

=== Midfielders ===
- (Argentina) Claudio Husaín
- (Czech Republic) Marek Jankulovski
- (Italy) Oscar Magoni
- (Brazil) Matuzalém
- (Italy) Francesco Moriero
- (Italy) Fabio Pecchia
- (Argentina) Mauricio Pineda
- (Italy) Giacomo Tedesco
- (Portugal) José Luís Vidigal

=== Attackers ===
- (Brazil) Amauri
- (Italy) Nicola Amoruso
- (Italy) Claudio Bellucci
- (Brazil) Edmundo
- (Italy) Antonio Floro Flores
- (Switzerland) (Italy) David Sesa
- (Italy) Roberto Stellone

== Serie A ==
Pos	Team	Pld	W	D	L	GF	GA	GD	Pts	Qualification or relegation
14	Hellas Verona (Note: Hellas Verona winner of 2000–01 Relegation tie-breaker against Reggina.)	34	10	7	17	40	59	−19	37 (Note: Lecce finished ahead of Reggina and Hellas Verona on head-to-head points: Lecce: 10 pts, Reggina: 4 pts, Hellas Verona: 2 pts.)	Relegation tie-breaker
15	Reggina (R)	34	10	7	17	32	49	−17	37	Serie B after tie-breaker
16	Vicenza (R)	34	9	9	16	37	51	−14	36 (Note: Vicenza finished ahead of Napoli on head-to-head points: Vicenza 2–0 Napoli, Napoli 1–2 Vicenza.)	Relegation to Serie B
17	Napoli (R)	34	8	12	14	35	51	−16	36	Relegation to Serie B
18	Bari (R)	34	5	5	24	31	68	−37	20	Relegation to Serie B

Source: 2000–01 Serie A, Soccerway, RSSSF.com
Rules for classification: 1) Points; 2) Head-to-head points; 3) Head-to-head goal difference; 4) Goal difference; 5) Goals scored; 6) Draw. (Note: Head-to-head record is used only after all the matches between the teams in question have been played).
(R) Relegated

=== Matches ===
1	Napoli	1–2	Juventus
	Stellone 41'		Kovačević 67'; Del Piero 75'

2	Inter	3–1	Napoli
	Di Biagio 10'; Zamorano 38'; Blanc 45'		Seedorf 60' (o.g.)

3	Napoli	1–5	Bologna
	Moriero 61'		Womé 4'; Baldini 24' (o.g.); Signori 50, 75'; J. Cruz 90'

4	Lecce	1–1	Napoli
	Vučinić 74'		Fresi 67'

5	Napoli	1–2	Vicenza
	Jankulovski 24'		Sommense 18, 51'

6	Perugia	1–1	Napoli
	Materazzi 71' (pen.)		Amoruso 18'

7	Napoli	0–0	Atalanta

8	Milan	1–0	Napoli
	Ambrosini 43'

9	Napoli	1–0	Bari
	Amoruso 45'

10	Brescia	1–1	Napoli
	Diana 31'		Pecchia 58'

11	Napoli	6–2	Reggina
	Baccin 5'; Magoni 20'; Amoruso 34' (pen.); Bellucci 56'; Troise 73'; Jankulovski 83'		Cozza 67' (pen.); Mozart 87'

12	Napoli	2–2	Parma
	Pecchia 47'; Amoruso 84'		Micoud 42'; Milošević 77'

13	Lazio	1–2	Napoli
	Mihajlović 84' (pen.)		Amoruso 4'; Pancaro 36' (o.g.)

14	Verona	2–1	Napoli
	Mutu 84'; Adaílton 89'		Bellucci 78'

15	Napoli	0–1	Udinese
			Sosa 68'

16	Roma	3–0	Napoli
	Delvecchio 21'; Totti 39'; Batistuta 85'

17	Napoli	1–0	Fiorentina
	Pecchia 90'

18	Juventus	3–0	Napoli
	Kovačević 12'; F. Inzaghi 52'; Del Piero 84'

19	Napoli	1–0	Inter
	Matuzalém 54'

20	Bologna	2–1	Napoli
	Signori 25' (pen.) 87'		Edmundo 35'

21	Napoli	1–1	Lecce
	Edmundo 51'		Vugrinec 76'

22	Vicenza	2–0	Napoli
	Toni 55'; Firmani 90'

23	Napoli	0–0	Perugia

24	Atalanta	1–1	Napoli
	Doni 69' (pen.)		Pecchia 38'

25	Napoli	0–0	Milan

26	Bari	0–1	Napoli
			Jankulovski 87'

27	Napoli	1–1	Brescia
	Amoruso 49' (pen.)		R. Baggio 90'

28	Reggina	3–1	Napoli
	Dionigi 5'; Marazzina 41'; Zanchetta 49'		Edmundo 59'

29	Parma	4–0	Napoli
	Micoud 32'; Milošević 50'; Di Vaio 65, 75'

30	Napoli	2–4	Lazio
	Amoruso 24, 46'		Crespo 32, 51'; Nedvěd 65'; Ravanelli 89'

31	Napoli	2–0	Verona
	Pecchia 41'; Amauri 82'

32	Udinese	0–0	Napoli

33	Napoli	2–2	Roma
	Amoruso 37'; Pecchia 82'		Batistuta 42'; Totti 52'

34	Fiorentina	1–2	Napoli
	Nuno Gomes 83'		Amoruso 48'; Edmundo 90'

=== Top scorers ===
- (Italy) Nicola Amoruso 10
- (Italy) Fabio Pecchia 6
- (Brazil) Edmundo 4
- (Czech Republic) Marek Jankulovski 3
