= 2001–02 Bologna FC 1909 season =

Bologna
2001–02 season
- Chairman: Renato Cipollini
- Manager: Francesco Guidolin
- Stadium: Stadio Renato Dall'Ara
- Serie A: 7th
- Coppa Italia: Round of 16
- Top goalscorer: League: Julio Cruz (10); All: Julio Cruz (12)
- Average home league attendance: 22,843
Home colours	Away colours	Third colours

During the 2001–02 season Bologna Football Club 1909 competed in Serie A and Coppa Italia.

== Summary ==
Bologna Football Club 1909 came as close as ever to qualifying for the UEFA Champions League, but some mishaps at the end of the season prevented their qualification. The midfield, led by Fabio Pecchia, Matteo Brighi and Lamberto Zauli, performed well throughout the season, but Bologna's salaries were not high enough to keep those players at the club, and Pecchia signed for newcomers Como, while Zauli went to Serie B club Palermo. That Bologna could not retain players, who could get better pay at smaller but more ambitious clubs, was a worrying sign in spite of the successful season. The club also had to sell defender Salvatore Fresi to champions Juventus, and looked set for a tougher season in 2002–03. During Fresi's 2001–02 season he scored a remarkable eight league goals, despite being a centre-half.

== Squad ==
Note: Flags indicate national team as defined under FIFA eligibility rules; some limited exceptions apply. Players may hold more than one non-FIFA nationality.

No.	Pos.	Nation	Player
1	GK	ITA	Gianluca Pagliuca
2	DF	ITA	Cristian Zaccardo
3	DF	CMR	Pierre Womé
4	MF	ITA	Renato Olive
5	DF	ITA	Marcello Castellini
6	DF	ITA	Emanuele Brioschi
7	DF	ITA	Carlo Nervo
8	DF	ITA	Salvatore Fresi
9	FW	ARG	Julio Cruz
10	FW	ITA	Giuseppe Signori
11	FW	ITA	Claudio Bellucci
12	GK	ITA	Ferdinando Coppola
13	DF	ITA	Fabio Macellari
14	MF	ITA	Roberto Goretti
15	MF	ITA	Fabio Firmani
16	DF	ITA	Alessandro Gamberini

No.	Pos.	Nation	Player
17	MF	ALG	Mourad Meghni
18	FW	ITA	Giacomo Cipriani
19	DF	ITA	Giulio Falcone
20	MF	ITA	Tomas Locatelli
21	FW	SWE	Björn Runström
23	DF	ITA	Massimo Tarantino
24	DF	ITA	Fabio Pecchia
25	MF	ITA	Matteo Brighi
28	MF	SLE	Momoh Bangura
30	MF	ITA	Lamberto Zauli
32	FW	ITA	Luigi Della Rocca
34	DF	YUG	Vlado Šmit
38	FW	ITA	Marco Negri
—	GK	ALG	Michael Fabre
—	DF	MLI	Mahamet Diagouraga

=== Transfers ===
In
Pos.	Name	from	Type
DF	Salvatore Fresi	Inter Milan	
MF	Matteo Brighi	Juventus	loan
MF	Fabio Pecchia	S.S.C. Napoli	
MF	Lamberto Zauli	Vicenza Calcio	(11.62 million lira)
FW	Claudio Bellucci		free
FW	Marco Negri	Glasgow Rangers	free
GK	Ferdinando Coppola	S.S.C. Napoli	re-purchased
DF	Fabio Macellari	Inter Milan	co-ownership
DF	Cristian Zaccardo	Spezia	loan ended
MF	Roberto Goretti	Perugia Calcio	loan ended

Out
Pos.	Name	To	Type
DF	Giovanni Bia	Saint-Étienne	
DF	Pasquale Padalino	Inter Milan	
MF	Jonathan Binotto	Inter Milan	co-ownership
MF	Eriberto	Chievo Verona	co-ownership (2.5 million lira)
MF	Francisco Lima	A.S. Roma	end of contract
MF	Enzo Maresca	Juventus	loan ended
MF	Giovanni Piacentini		retired
FW	Igor Kolyvanov		retired
FW	Luís Oliveira	Como	end of contract

==== Winter ====
In
Pos.	Name	from	Type
DF	Vlado Smit	Zeleznik F.C.	loan (0,15 million €)
MF	Fabio Firmani	Chievo Verona	loan

Out
Pos.	Name	To	Type
DF	Claiton	A.C. Milan	
FW	Marco Negri	Cagliari Calcio	

== Competitions ==
=== Serie A ===
==== League table ====
Pos	Team	Pld	W	D	L	GF	GA	GD	Pts	Qualification or relegation
5	Chievo	34	14	12	8	57	52	+5	54	Qualification to UEFA Cup first round
6	Lazio	34	14	11	9	50	37	+13	53	Qualification to UEFA Cup first round
7	Bologna	34	15	7	12	40	40	0	52	Qualification to Intertoto Cup third round
8	Perugia	34	13	7	14	38	46	−8	46	Qualification to Intertoto Cup third round
9	Atalanta	34	12	9	13	41	50	−9	45	

Source: 2001–02 Serie A, Soccerway
Rules for classification: 1) Points; 2) Head-to-head points; 3) Head-to-head goal difference; 4) Goal difference; 5) Goals scored; 6) Draw. (Note: Head-to-head record is used only after all the matches between the teams in question have been played).

==== Results by round ====
Round	1	2	3	4	5	6	7	8	9	10	11	12	13	14	15	16	17	18	19	20	21	22	23	24	25	26	27	28	29	30	31	32	33	34
Ground	H	A	H	A	A	A	H	A	H	A	H	H	A	H	H	A	H	A	H	A	H	H	A	H	A	H	A	H	A	A	H	A	H	A
Result	W	L	W	W	L	W	D	D	W	L	L	W	L	W	L	D	W	D	W	L	D	W	W	W	L	W	D	W	L	D	L	L	W	L
Position	1	8	4	4	5	3	4	5	3	3	5	5	7	5	6	6	6	6	6	6	6	5	4	4	4	4	4	4	4	4	5	7	5	7

Source: Competitive matches
A = Away; H = Home; W = Win; D = Draw; L = Loss; P = Postponed; = Leader, 2002–03 UEFA Champions League Group stage; = 2002–03 UEFA Champions League Group stage; = 2002–03 UEFA Champions League Qualifying round; = 2002–03 UEFA Cup First round; = Qualification to Intertoto Cup; = 2002–03 Serie B

==== Matches ====
25 August 2001 1	Bologna	1–0	Atalanta	Bologna
20:30 CEST	Signori 19'	Report		Stadium: Stadio Renato Dall'Ara; Attendance: 22 070; Referee: Roberto Rosetti

9 September 2001 2	Chievo Verona	2–0	Bologna	Verona
15:00 CEST	Corradi 13'; Cossato 85'	Report		Stadium: Stadio Marcantonio Bentegodi; Attendance: 9 852; Referee: Alfredo Trentalange

16 September 2001 3	Bologna	1–0	Parma	Bologna
15:00 CEST	Cruz 58'	Report		Stadium: Stadio Renato Dall'Ara; Attendance: 17 945; Referee: Daniele Tombolini

23 September 2001 4	Venezia	0–1	Bologna	Venice
15:00 CEST		Report	90' Zauli	Stadium: Stadio Pier Luigi Penzo; Attendance: 6 513; Referee: Matteo Trefoloni

30 September 2001 5	Inter Milan	1–0	Bologna	Milan
15:00 CEST	Georgatos 24'	Report		Stadium: Stadio Giuseppe Meazza; Attendance: 70 000; Referee: Stefano Farina

14 October 2001 7	Hellas Verona	0–1	Bologna	Verona
15:00 CEST		Report	33' Fresi	Stadium: Stadio Marcantonio Bentegodi; Attendance: 16 278; Referee: Tiziano Pieri

20 October 2001 8	Bologna	0–0	Juventus	Bologna
20:30 CEST		Report		Stadium: Stadio Renato Dall'Ara; Attendance: 38.000; Referee: Gianluca Paparesta

28 October 2001 9	Milan	0–0	Bologna	Milan
15:00 CET		Report		Stadium: Stadio Giuseppe Meazza; Attendance: 55 000; Referee: Massimo De Santis

4 November 2001 10	Bologna	3–2	Fiorentina	Bologna
15:00 CET	Fresi 12', 17'; Zauli 32'	Report	15' Ganz; 26' Vanoli	Stadium: Stadio Renato Dall'Ara; Attendance: 25.000; Referee: Emilio Pellegrino

18 November 2001 11	Lecce	1–0	Bologna	Lecce
15:00 CET	Cirillo 37'	Report		Stadium: Stadio Via del Mare; Attendance: 12.000; Referee: Paolo Bertini

25 November 2001 12	Bologna	1–3	Roma	Bologna
15:00 CET	Womé 38'	Report	3' Samuel; 16' Batistuta; 40' Assunção	Stadium: Stadio Renato Dall'Ara; Attendance: 30 000; Referee: Gianluca Paparesta

2 December 2001 13	Bologna	1–0	Torino	Bologna
20:30 CET	Olive 5'	Report		Stadium: Stadio Renato Dall'Ara; Attendance: 18 200; Referee: Matteo Trefoloni

8 December 2001 14	Piacenza	2–0	Bologna	Piacenza
20:30 CET	Hübner 51', 63'	Report		Stadium: Stadio Leonardo Garilli; Attendance: 6 000; Referee: Alfredo Trentalange

16 December 2001 15	Bologna	2–1	Perugia	Bologna
15:00 CET	Pecchia 28'; Fresi 45'	Report	22' Tedesco II	Stadium: Stadio Renato Dall'Ara; Attendance: 15.000; Referee: Stefano Braschi

19 December 2001 6	Bologna	0–1	Udinese	Bologna
15:00 CET	Fresi 65'	Report	56' Jørgensen	Stadium: Stadio Renato Dall'Ara; Attendance: 16 844; Referee: Emilio Pellegrino

22 December 2001 16	Lazio	2–2	Bologna	Rome
20:30 CET	López 19', 35'	Report	41' Cruz; 76' Zaccardo	Stadium: Stadio Olimpico; Attendance: 35 000; Referee: Gianluca Paparesta

6 January 2002 17	Bologna	2–1	Brescia	Bologna
15:00 CET	Petruzzi 10' (o.g.); Nervo 30'	Report	43' Toni	Stadium: Stadio Renato Dall'Ara; Attendance: 16 000; Referee: Robert Boggi

13 January 2002 18	Atalanta	2–2	Bologna	Bergamo
15:00 CET	Doni 10' (pen.); Berretta 22'	Report	41' Olive; 90' Brioschi	Stadium: Stadio Atleti Azzurri d'Italia; Attendance: 15 000; Referee: Cosimo Bolognino

20 January 2002 19	Bologna	3–1	Chievo Verona	Bologna
15:00 CET	Zauli 40', 90'; Cruz 70'	Report	73' Beghetto	Stadium: Stadio Renato Dall'Ara; Attendance: 23.000; Referee: Pierluigi Collina

26 January 2002 20	Parma	2–1	Bologna	Parma
20:30 CET	Cannavaro 7'; Şükür 16'	Report	53' Pecchia	Stadium: Stadio Ennio Tardini; Attendance: 17 286; Referee: Gennaro Borriello

3 February 2002 21	Bologna	1–1	Venezia	Bologna
15:00 CET	Bellucci 60'	Report	24' Maniero	Stadium: Stadio Renato Dall'Ara; Attendance: 17 500; Referee: Nicola Ayroldi

10 February 2002 22	Bologna	2–1	Inter Milan	Bologna
15:00 CET	Pecchia 56'; Zauli 74'	Report	89' Seedorf	Stadium: Stadio Renato Dall'Ara; Attendance: 37 000; Referee: Pierluigi Collina

17 February 2002 23	Udinese	0–1	Bologna	Udine
15:00 CET		Report	12' Cruz	Stadium: Stadio Friuli; Attendance: 13 369; Referee: Gianluca Paparesta

24 February 2002 24	Bologna	2–1	Hellas Verona	Bologna
15:00 CET	Fresi 78'; Cruz 90'	Report	75' Gilardino	Stadium: Stadio Renato Dall'Ara; Attendance: 20.790; Referee: Matteo Trefoloni

3 March 2002 25	Juventus	2–1	Bologna	Turin
15:00 CET	Trezeguet 37'; Tarantino 89' (o.g.)	Report	36' Zauli	Stadium: Stadio delle Alpi; Attendance: 35 703; Referee: Stefano Braschi

10 March 2002 26	Bologna	2–0	Milan	Bologna
15:00 CET	Fresi 3'; Cruz 24'	Report		Stadium: Stadio Renato Dall'Ara; Attendance: 31 754; Referee: Pierluigi Collina

17 March 2002 27	Fiorentina	1–1	Bologna	Florence
15:00 CET	González 45'	Report	60' Cruz	Stadium: Stadio Comunale; Attendance: 15 000; Referee: Cosimo Bolognino

24 March 2002 28	Bologna	4–3	Lecce	Bologna
15:00 CET	Pecchia 13'; Cruz 65'; Signori 72'; Fresi 82'	Report	19', 37' Popescu; 68' Chevantón	Stadium: Stadio Renato Dall'Ara; Attendance: 22 146; Referee: Pasquale Rodomonti

30 March 2002 29	Roma	3–1	Bologna	Rome
15:00 CET	Montella 33'; Emerson 42', 52'	Report	82' Cruz	Stadium: Stadio Olimpico; Attendance: 59 408; Referee: Roberto Rosetti

6 April 2002 30	Torino	1–1	Bologna	Turin
20:30 CEST	Scarchilli 20'	Report	51' Cruz	Stadium: Stadio delle Alpi; Attendance: 18 626; Referee: Daniele Tombolini

14 April 2002 31	Bologna	1–2	Piacenza	Bologna
15:00 CEST	Fresi 62'	Report	3' Tosto; 50' Di Francesco	Stadium: Stadio Renato Dall'Ara; Attendance: 21 871; Referee: Paolo Bertini

21 April 2002 32	Perugia	1–0	Bologna	Perugia
15:00 CEST	Zé Maria 51' (pen.)	Report		Stadium: Stadio Renato Curi; Attendance: 7 113; Referee: Pierluigi Collina

28 April 2002 33	Bologna	2–0	Lazio	Bologna
15:00 CEST	Signori 51'; Pecchia 88'	Report		Stadium: Stadio Renato Dall'Ara; Attendance: 28 869; Referee: Fiorenzo Treossi

5 May 2002 34	Brescia	3–0	Bologna	Brescia
15:00 CEST	Bachini 48'; Baggio I 74'; Toni 88'	Report		Stadium: Stadio Mario Rigamonti; Attendance: 20 144; Referee: Pierluigi Collina

=== Coppa Italia ===
==== Second round ====
19 September 2001 First leg	Empoli	1–4	Bologna	Empoli
	Tavano 32'		25', 66' Cruz; 61' Gamberini; 90' Pecchia	Stadium: Stadio Carlo Castellani; Referee: Gennaro Borriello

24 October 2001 Second leg	Bologna	1–3 (5–4 agg.)	Empoli	Bologna
	Nervo 26'		3' Bonetto; 70', 88' Maccarone	Stadium: Stadio Renato Dall'Ara; Referee: Mario Palmieri

==== Eightfinals ====
10 November 2001 1	Bologna	2–2	Atalanta	Bologna
	Olive 18'; Bellucci 88'		17' Comandini; 39' Rossini	Stadium: Stadio Renato Dall'Ara; Attendance: 5.000; Referee: Cosimo Bolognino

29 November 2001 2	Atalanta	0–0 (2a-2 agg.)	Bologna	Bergamo
				Stadium: Stadio Atleti Azzurri d'Italia; Referee: Marco Gabriele

== Statistics ==
=== Players statistics ===
No.	Pos	Nat	Player	Total		Serie A		Coppa	
No.	Pos	Nat	Player	Apps	Goals	Apps	Goals	Apps	Goals
1	GK	(Italy) ITA	Pagliuca	34	-40	34	-40	0	0
19	DF	(Italy) ITA	Falcone	35	0	32	0	3	0
5	DF	(Italy) ITA	Castellini	33	0	30	0	3	0
8	DF	(Italy) ITA	Fresi	27	8	24+1	8	2	0
23	DF	(Italy) ITA	Tarantino	25	0	22	0	3	0
7	MF	(Italy) ITA	Nervo	33	2	25+4	1	4	1
4	MF	(Italy) ITA	Olive	30	3	28	2	2	1
25	MF	(Italy) ITA	Brighi	34	0	29+3	0	2	0
24	MF	(Italy) ITA	Pecchia	37	6	30+3	5	4	1
30	MF	(Italy) ITA	Zauli	30	6	23+4	6	3	0
9	FW	(Argentina) ARG	Julio Cruz	36	12	32+1	10	3	2
12	GK	(Italy) ITA	Coppola	4	-6	0	0	4	-6
6	DF	(Italy) ITA	Brioschi	26	1	12+12	1	2	0
10	FW	(Italy) ITA	Signori	15	3	11+3	3	1	0
13	DF	(Italy) ITA	Macellari	12	0	10	0	2	0
2	DF	(Italy) ITA	Zaccardo	21	1	8+11	1	2	0
16	DF	(Italy) ITA	Gamberini	18	1	7+8	0	3	1
3	DF	(Cameroon) CMR	Wome	16	1	7+6	1	3	0
11	FW	(Italy) ITA	Bellucci	28	2	5+19	1	4	1
15	MF	(Italy) ITA	Firmani	5	0	2+3	0		
20	MF	(Italy) ITA	Locatelli	2	0	2	0		
14	MF	(Italy) ITA	Goretti	4	0	2	0	2	0
38	FW	(Italy) ITA	Negri	2	0	2	0		
32	FW	(Italy) ITA	Della Rocca	9	0	1+5	0	3	0
17	MF	(Algeria) ALG	Meghni	1	0	0	0	1	0
15	DF	(Brazil) BRA	Claiton	0	0	0	0		
26	DF	(Italy) ITA	Terzi	0	0	0	0		
34	DF	(Federal Republic of Yugoslavia) YUG	Šmit	0	0	0	0		
28	MF	(Sierra Leone) SLE	Bangura	0	0	0	0		
18	FW	(Italy) ITA	Cipriani	0	0	0	0		
21	FW	(Sweden) SWE	Runström	0	0	0	0		

- Source: http://calcio-seriea.net/presenze/2001/1196/

== Sources ==
RSSSF – Italy 2001/02
