= 1995–96 US Cremonese season =

Cremonese
1995–96 season
- Chairman: Domenico Luzzara
- Manager: Luigi Simoni
- Stadium: Stadio Giovanni Zini
- Serie A: 17th (relegated)
- Coppa Italia: Second round
- Top goalscorer: League: Andrea Tentoni (9); All: Riccardo Maspero; Andrea Tentoni (9 each)
- Biggest win: Cremonese 7–1 Bari
- Biggest defeat: Milan 7–1 Cremonese
Home colours	Away colours

The 1995–96 season was the 93rd season in existence of Cremonese and the club's third consecutive season in the top flight of Italian football. In addition to the domestic league, Cremonese participated in this season's edition of the Coppa Italia. The season covered the period from 1 July 1995 to 30 June 1996.

== Pre-season and friendlies ==
Win Draw Loss

=== Overview ===
Competition	First match	Last match	Starting round	Final position	Record							
Competition	First match	Last match	Starting round	Final position	Pld	W	D	L	GF	GA	GD	Win %
Serie A	27 August 1995	12 May 1996	Matchday 1	17th	0	0	0	0	0	0	+0	—
Coppa Italia	19 August 1995	30 August 1995	First round	Second round	2	1	1	0	3	2	+1	50.00
Total					2	1	1	0	3	2	+1	50.00

Source: Competitions

=== Serie A ===
==== League table ====
Pos	Team	Pld	W	D	L	GF	GA	GD	Pts	Qualification or relegation
14	Piacenza	34	9	10	15	31	48	−17	37	
15	Bari (R)	34	8	8	18	49	71	−22	32	Relegation to Serie B
16	Torino (R)	34	6	11	17	28	46	−18	29	Relegation to Serie B
17	Cremonese (R)	34	5	12	17	37	57	−20	27	Relegation to Serie B
18	Padova (R)	34	7	3	24	41	79	−38	24	Relegation to Serie B

Source: 1995–96 Serie A, RSSSF.com, Soccerway
Rules for classification: 1) Points; 2) Head-to-head points; 3) Head-to-head goal difference; 4) Goal difference; 5) Goals scored; 6) Draw. (Note: Head-to-head record is used only after all the matches between the teams in question have been played).
(R) Relegated

==== Results summary ====
Overall								Home						Away					
Pld	W	D	L	GF	GA	GD	Pts	W	D	L	GF	GA	GD	W	D	L	GF	GA	GD
0	0	0	0	0	0	0	0	0	0	0	0	0	0	0	0	0	0	0	0

Source: Serie A

==== Results by round ====
Round	1	2	3	4	5	6	7	8	9	10	11	12	13	14	15	16	17	18	19	20	21	22	23	24	25	26	27	28	29	30	31	32	33	34
Ground	A	H	A	H	A	A	H	A	H	A	H	A	H	A	H	A	H	H	A	H	A	H	H	A	H	A	H	A	H	A	H	A	H	A
Result	L	D	L	L	L	L	D	D	L	L	W	L	W	L	D	L	D	D	L	D	L	D	W	D	D	L	W	W	L	L	D	L	D	L
Position																																		

Source: Serie A
A = Away; H = Home; W = Win; D = Draw; L = Loss

==== Matches ====
27 August 1995 1	Juventus	4–1	Cremonese	Turin
CEST (UTC+2)

10 September 1995 2	Cremonese	0–0	Sampdoria	Cremona
CEST (UTC+2)				Stadium: Stadio Giovanni Zini

17 September 1995 3	Udinese	3–2	Cremonese	Udine
CEST (UTC+2)

24 September 1995 4	Cremonese	0–1	Roma	Cremona
CEST (UTC+2)				Stadium: Stadio Giovanni Zini

1 October 1995 5	Fiorentina	3–2	Cremonese	Florence
CEST (UTC+2)

15 October 1995 6	Cagliari	1–0	Cremonese	Cagliari
CEST (UTC+2)

22 October 1995 7	Cremonese	1–1	Atalanta	Cremona
CEST (UTC+2)				Stadium: Stadio Giovanni Zini

29 October 1995 8	Napoli	0–0	Cremonese	Naples
CEST (UTC+2)

5 November 1995 9	Cremonese	0–2	Parma	Cremona
CET (UTC+1)				Stadium: Stadio Giovanni Zini

19 November 1995 10	Lazio	2–1	Cremonese	Rome
CEST (UTC+2)

26 November 1995 11	Cremonese	2–1	Padova	Cremona
CET (UTC+1)				Stadium: Stadio Giovanni Zini

3 December 1995 12	Internazionale	2–0	Cremonese	Milan
CEST (UTC+2)

10 December 1995 13	Cremonese	7–1	Bari	Cremona
CET (UTC+1)	Brioschi 8' (o.g.); Gualco 26'; Florjančič 39'; Perović 42', 69'; Aloisi 45'; Tentoni 74'		Andersson 22'	Stadium: Stadio Giovanni Zini; Attendance: 5,600; Referee: Piero Ceccarini

17 December 1995 14	Piacenza	2–1	Cremonese	Piacenza
CEST (UTC+2)

23 December 1995 15	Cremonese	1–1	Torino	Cremona
CET (UTC+1)				Stadium: Stadio Giovanni Zini

7 January 1996 16	Vicenza	1–0	Cremonese	Vicenza
CEST (UTC+2)

14 January 1996 17	Cremonese	0–0	Milan	Cremona
CET (UTC+1)				Stadium: Stadio Giovanni Zini

21 January 1996 18	Cremonese	3–3	Juventus	Cremona
CET (UTC+1)				Stadium: Stadio Giovanni Zini

28 January 1996 19	Sampdoria	2–0	Cremonese	Genoa
CEST (UTC+2)

4 February 1996 20	Cremonese	2–2	Udinese	Cremona
CET (UTC+1)				Stadium: Stadio Giovanni Zini

11 February 1996 21	Roma	3–0	Cremonese	Rome
CEST (UTC+2)

18 February 1996 22	Cremonese	0–0	Fiorentina	Cremona
CET (UTC+1)				Stadium: Stadio Giovanni Zini

25 February 1996 23	Cremonese	3–1	Cagliari	Cremona
CET (UTC+1)				Stadium: Stadio Giovanni Zini

3 March 1996 24	Atalanta	1–1	Cremonese	Atalanta
CEST (UTC+2)

10 March 1996 25	Cremonese	1–1	Napoli	Cremona
CET (UTC+1)				Stadium: Stadio Giovanni Zini

24 March 1996 27	Cremonese	2–1	Lazio	Cremona
CET (UTC+1)				Stadium: Stadio Giovanni Zini

31 March 1996 28	Padova	1–2	Cremonese	Padua
CEST (UTC+2)

6 April 1996 29	Cremonese	2–4	Internazionale	Cremona
CET (UTC+1)				Stadium: Stadio Giovanni Zini

10 April 1996 26	Parma	2–0	Cremonese	Parma
CEST (UTC+2)

14 April 1996 30	Bari	2–1	Cremonese	Bari
CEST (UTC+2)

21 April 1996 31	Cremonese	0–0	Piacenza	Cremona
CET (UTC+1)				Stadium: Stadio Giovanni Zini

28 April 1996 32	Torino	1–0	Cremonese	Turin
CEST (UTC+2)

5 May 1996 33	Cremonese	1–1	Vicenza	Cremona
CET (UTC+1)				Stadium: Stadio Giovanni Zini

12 May 1996 34	Milan	7–1	Cremonese	Milan
CEST (UTC+2)

=== Coppa Italia ===
19 August 1995 Second round	Varese	0–1	Cremonese	Varese
20:30 CEST (UTC+2)			Maspero 69'	Stadium: Stadio Franco Ossola; Referee: Lorenzo Branzoni

30 August 1995 Second round	Atalanta	2–2 (a.e.t.) (4–2 p)	Cremonese	Bergamo
20:30 CEST (UTC+2)				Stadium: Stadio Atleti Azzurri d'Italia; Referee: Livio Bazzoli
