= Caçapa =

Caçapa may refer to:

- Cláudio Caçapa, Brazilian football defender and manager Cláudio Roberto da Silva (born 1976)
- Gérson Caçapa, Brazilian football midfielder Gérson Cândido de Paula (born 1967)
