= Malafronte =

Malafronte is a surname. Notable people with the surname include:

- Judith Malafronte, American opera singer
- Luigi Malafronte (born 1978), Italian footballer
