= Ficini =

Ficini is a surname. Notable people with the surname include:

- Fabrizio Ficini (born 1973), Italian former football (soccer) midfielder
- Jacqueline Ficini (1923-1988), French researcher and professor of chemistry
