= 1995–96 Serie A =

94th season of top-tier Italian football

Serie A
- Season: 1995–96
- Dates: 27 August 1995 – 12 May 1996
- Champions: Milan; 15th title
- Relegated: Bari; Torino; Cremonese; Padova
- Champions League: Milan; Juventus
- Cup Winners' Cup: Fiorentina
- UEFA Cup: Lazio; Roma; Parma; Internazionale
- Matches: 306
- Goals: 805 (2.63 per match)
- Top goalscorer: Igor Protti; Giuseppe Signori (24 goals each)

Serie A 1995-96 team distribution

The 1995–96 Serie A title was won by Milan (15th title for the Milan-based club), with Juventus finishing as runners-up. Fourth placed Fiorentina tasted glory in the Coppa Italia, while seventh-placed Internazionale only narrowly managed to qualify for the UEFA Cup under the management of their new English head coach Roy Hodgson. In fact Internazionale needed both Fiorentina beating Atalanta in the 1995–96 Coppa Italia Final and their (Internazionale's) arch-rivals AC Milan and Juventus win the Serie A (Milan) and the 1995–96 UEFA Champions League Final (Juventus). Had one of these three things not occurred Internazionale would have missed out on european football for the second time in four years (having failed to qualify for any of the 1992–93 UEFA club competitions). Bari, Torino, Cremonese and Padova were all relegated.

== Teams ==
Piacenza, Udinese, Vicenza and Atalanta had been promoted from Serie B.

== Personnel and Sponsoring ==
Team	Head Coach	Kit manufacturer	Shirt sponsor
Atalanta	(Italy) Emiliano Mondonico	Asics	Somet
Bari	(Italy) Eugenio Fascetti	Adidas	CEPU
Cagliari	(Italy) Bruno Giorgi	Erreà	Pecorino Sardo
Cremonese	(Italy) Luigi Simoni	Uhlsport	Negroni
Fiorentina	(Italy) Claudio Ranieri	Reebok	Sammontana
Internazionale	(England) Roy Hodgson	Umbro	Pirelli
Juventus	(Italy) Marcello Lippi	Kappa	Sony
Lazio	(Czech Republic) Zdeněk Zeman	Umbro	Banco di Roma
Milan	(Italy) Fabio Capello	Lotto	Opel
Napoli	(Federal Republic of Yugoslavia) Vujadin Boškov	Lotto	Record Cucine
Padova	(Italy) Mauro Sandreani	Diadora	Acqua Vera
Parma	(Italy) Nevio Scala	Puma	Parmalat
Piacenza	(Italy) Bortolo Mutti	ABM	Caripiacenza
Roma	(Italy) Carlo Mazzone	Asics	INA Assitalia
Sampdoria	(Sweden) Sven-Göran Eriksson	Asics	Nuova Tirrena
Torino	(Italy) Lido Vieri	Lotto	SDA Express Courier
Udinese	(Italy) Alberto Zaccheroni	Hummel	Albatros Idromassaggio
Vicenza	(Italy) Francesco Guidolin	Biemme	Pal Zileri

== League table ==
Pos	Team	Pld	W	D	L	GF	GA	GD	Pts	Qualification or relegation
1	Milan (C)	34	21	10	3	60	24	+36	73	Qualified to Champions League
2	Juventus	34	19	8	7	58	35	+23	65 (Note: Juventus qualified to 1996–97 UEFA Champions League as title holders.)	Qualified to Champions League
3	Lazio	34	17	8	9	66	38	+28	59	Qualification to UEFA Cup
4	Fiorentina	34	17	8	9	53	41	+12	59	Qualification to Cup Winners' Cup
5	Roma	34	16	10	8	51	34	+17	58 (Note: ROM 1-1 PAR; PAR 1-1 ROM Roma is ahead due to Goal difference.)	Qualification to UEFA Cup
6	Parma	34	16	10	8	44	31	+13	58	Qualification to UEFA Cup
7	Internazionale	34	15	9	10	51	30	+21	54	Qualification to UEFA Cup
8	Sampdoria	34	14	10	10	59	47	+12	52	
9	Vicenza	34	13	10	11	36	37	−1	49	
10	Cagliari	34	11	8	15	34	47	−13	41 (Note: CAG 7pts. UDI 6pts. NAP 4pts.)	
11	Udinese	34	11	8	15	41	49	−8	41	
12	Napoli	34	10	11	13	28	41	−13	41	
13	Atalanta	34	11	6	17	38	50	−12	39	
14	Piacenza	34	9	10	15	31	48	−17	37	
15	Bari (R)	34	8	8	18	49	71	−22	32	Relegation to Serie B
16	Torino (R)	34	6	11	17	28	46	−18	29	Relegation to Serie B
17	Cremonese (R)	34	5	12	17	37	57	−20	27	Relegation to Serie B
18	Padova (R)	34	7	3	24	41	79	−38	24	Relegation to Serie B

Source: 1995–96 Serie A, RSSSF.com, Soccerway
Rules for classification: 1) Points; 2) Head-to-head points; 3) Head-to-head goal difference; 4) Goal difference; 5) Goals scored; 6) Draw. (Note: Head-to-head record is used only after all the matches between the teams in question have been played).
(C) Champions; (R) Relegated

== Results ==
Home \ Away	ATA	BAR	CAG	CRE	FIO	INT	JUV	LAZ	MIL	NAP	PAD	PAR	PIA	ROM	SAM	TOR	UDI	VIC
Atalanta	—	1–2	3–0	1–1	1–3	1–1	0–1	1–3	0–1	1–3	3–0	1–1	2–0	2–1	3–2	1–0	0–0	3–1
Bari	1–3	—	3–0	2–1	1–1	4–1	2–2	3–3	1–0	1–1	2–1	1–1	0–0	1–2	1–3	2–2	4–2	0–2
Cagliari	2–0	4–2	—	1–0	0–0	0–0	0–0	0–1	1–2	2–0	0–1	2–0	0–0	0–2	3–0	1–0	4–1	2–0
Cremonese	1–1	7–1	3–1	—	0–0	2–4	3–3	2–1	0–0	1–1	2–1	0–2	0–0	0–1	0–0	1–1	2–2	1–1
Fiorentina	1–0	3–2	3–1	3–2	—	1–1	0–1	2–0	2–2	3–0	6–4	1–0	2–1	1–4	2–2	2–0	3–0	1–1
Internazionale	1–0	3–0	4–0	2–0	1–2	—	1–2	0–0	1–1	4–0	8–2	1–1	0–0	2–0	0–2	4–0	2–1	1–0
Juventus	1–0	1–1	4–1	4–1	1–0	1–0	—	4–2	1–1	1–1	3–1	1–0	2–0	0–2	0–3	5–0	2–1	1–0
Lazio	5–1	4–3	4–0	2–1	4–0	0–1	4–0	—	0–1	1–0	2–0	2–1	4–1	1–0	6–3	1–1	2–2	3–0
Milan	3–0	3–2	3–2	7–1	3–1	0–1	2–1	0–0	—	0–0	1–0	3–0	3–0	3–1	3–0	1–1	2–1	4–0
Napoli	2–0	1–0	0–0	0–0	0–2	2–1	0–1	1–0	0–1	—	2–0	1–1	0–0	0–2	1–0	1–0	2–1	1–1
Padova	3–2	3–0	2–1	1–2	0–1	2–1	0–5	1–3	1–2	4–2	—	1–3	1–1	1–2	1–1	1–1	2–3	3–2
Parma	2–0	3–1	4–0	2–0	3–0	2–1	1–1	2–1	0–0	1–0	2–1	—	3–2	1–1	1–0	1–0	1–0	0–1
Piacenza	2–2	3–2	1–1	2–1	0–1	1–0	0–4	2–1	0–2	0–1	4–0	2–1	—	1–0	3–2	1–0	0–2	0–1
Roma	0–1	2–1	1–1	3–0	2–2	1–0	2–2	0–0	1–2	4–1	2–0	1–1	2–1	—	3–1	1–0	2–1	1–1
Sampdoria	2–3	2–0	1–2	2–0	2–1	0–0	2–0	3–3	3–0	2–2	3–1	3–0	3–0	1–1	—	1–0	1–0	2–2
Torino	0–1	3–1	1–1	1–0	0–3	0–1	1–2	0–2	1–1	0–0	2–0	2–2	4–2	2–2	1–1	—	2–0	1–0
Udinese	3–0	1–2	1–0	3–2	1–0	1–2	1–0	1–1	0–2	3–2	3–1	0–0	0–0	1–1	2–4	1–0	—	1–1
Vicenza	1–0	2–0	0–1	1–0	1–0	1–1	2–1	1–0	1–1	3–0	2–1	0–1	1–1	2–1	2–2	2–1	0–1	—

Legend: Blue = home team win; Yellow = draw; Red = away team win.

== Top goalscorers ==
Rank	Player	Club	Goals
1	(Italy) Igor Protti	Bari	24
1	(Italy) Giuseppe Signori	Lazio	24
3	(Italy) Enrico Chiesa	Sampdoria	22
4	(Argentina) Gabriel Batistuta	Fiorentina	19
4	(Italy) Marco Branca	Roma, Internazionale	19
6	(Germany) Oliver Bierhoff	Udinese	17
7	(Belgium) Luis Oliveira	Cagliari	16
8	(Italy) Nicola Amoruso	Padova	14
8	(Italy) Nicola Caccia	Piacenza	14
8	(Italy) Pierluigi Casiraghi	Lazio	14

== Season tickets ==
The season ticket sales as they were before the beginning of the season:

Source: Statistiche Spettatori Serie A 1995-1996

Rank	Club	Tickets
1	Milan	48,234
2	Roma	40,200
3	Juventus	35,839
4	Lazio	33,033
5	Inter	29,802
6	Fiorentina	29,712
7	Sampdoria	20,327
8	Parma	21,047
9	Napoli	19,005
10	Cagliari	15,000
11	Torino	13,650
12	Bari	13,025
13	Atalanta	12,213
14	Vicenza	12,000
15	Padova	9,818
16	Udinese	8,138
17	Piacenza	7,814
18	Cremonese	2,961

== Attendances ==
No.	Club	Average
1	Milan	60,973
2	Roma	53,146
3	Internazionale	46,873
4	Lazio	46,326
5	Juventus	41,946
6	Napoli	40,450
7	Fiorentina	37,983
8	Bari	26,322
9	Sampdoria	26,070
10	Parma	23,731
11	Torino	20,284
12	Atalanta	19,295
13	Cagliari	18,247
14	Vicenza	16,696
15	Udinese	15,742
16	Padova	14,696
17	Piacenza	12,642
18	Cremonese	8,615

== References and sources ==
- Almanacco Illustrato del Calcio - La Storia 1898-2004, Panini Edizioni, Modena, September 2005
