= Salvatore Russo (footballer) =

Italian footballer

Personal information
- Date of birth: 12 July 1971 (age 55)
- Place of birth: Margherita di Savoia, Italy
- Height: 1.70 m (5 ft 7 in)
- Positions: Midfielder; defender

Senior career*
Years	Team	Apps	(Gls)
1989–1990	Andria	1	(0)
1990–1991	Ischia	26	(0)
1991–1992	Napoli	0	(0)
1992–1995	Ischia	52	(0)
1995–1996	Boys Caivanese	18	(0)
1996	Ischia	1	(0)
1996–1998	Battipagliese	55	(4)
1998–2000	Nocerina	49	(1)
2000–2004	Ancona	122	(5)
2004	Salernitana	15	(0)
2004–2006	Ternana	65	(1)
2007–2011	Salernitana	49	(0)
2011–2012	Paganese	13	(0)
Total		466	(11)
- * Club domestic league appearances and goals

Salvatore Russo (born 12 July 1971) is a retired Italian footballer. Russo played over 180 matches in Serie B and 200 matches in Serie C1.

== Career ==
Russo started his professional career at Serie C1 and Serie C2 clubs. In January 2000, he was signed by Ancona at Serie C1 and followed the team promoted to Serie A in 2003. He played his first Serie A match on 31 August 2003, a 0–2 loss to A.C. Milan. He played 8 more Serie A matches before leaving for Salernitana of Serie B in January 2004. In August 2004, he was signed by league rival Ternana. He followed the club relegated to Serie C1 in mid-2006, but in January 2007 Russo was re-signed by Salernitana, now in Serie C1. He won Serie C1 Champion in 2008 and, with the team, avoided relegation by finishing mid-table but 1 point away from the relegation zone.

== Honours ==
- Serie C1 Champion: 2008
