= Bruce Dombolo =

French footballer (1985–2025)

Personal information
- Full name: Bruce Pungu Dombolo
- Date of birth: 27 May 1985
- Place of birth: Marseille, France
- Date of death: 15 March 2025 (aged 39)
- Height: 1.83 m (6 ft 0 in)
- Position: Midfielder

Youth career
- –2003: Auxerre

Senior career*
Years	Team	Apps	(Gls)
2003–2004	Ancona	2	(0)
2004–2005	Pro Vasto	10	(1)
2008–2009	Marignane	9	(0)
- * Club domestic league appearances and goals

Bruce Pungu Dombolo (27 May 1985 – 15 March 2025) was a French footballer and actor.

After a brief sports career, he fell into banditry and was convicted twice for robberies, spending several years in prison.

== Background ==
Of Congolese origin, Dombolo born on May 27, 1985, in Marseille and spent his childhood in Vitrolles in the Pins district, then in Liourat.

Dombolo died in his sleep on the night of 15 March 2025, at the age of 39.

== Football career ==
Dombolo played for the youth side of Auxerre. He transferred to Italian Serie A club Ancona and made two league appearances during the 2003–04 season. He joined Serie C2 side Pro Vasto for the following season, but subsequently played for amateur sides.

== Banditry and post-prison life ==
After a brief sports career, Dombolo fell into banditry and was arrested for a first time for robbery.

After his release from prison, he set up his own gang and committed several robberies in the region. He and his team were arrested and convicted in 2012 of the robbery of a jewelry store in a shopping mall in Puget-sur-Argens in the Var region two years earlier.

Dombolo was a candidate in the television show Le Grand Oral on France 2 in February 2020.

In 2021, director Akim Isker directed him in the France 2 TV film L'enfant de personne, starring Isabelle Carré and Nawell Madani, which sheds light on some of the realities of children's lives in child welfare homes. Akim Isker then cast him in the role of a police lieutenant in the TF1 series, "Visions".

Dombolo died on March 16, 2025, at the age of 39, in his sleep.

== Filmography ==
=== Television ===
- 2021: L'Enfant de personne: Djibril
- 2022: Visions: Ruben Sadri
- 2022: Sage-Homme: Prince
