= Luca Gentili (footballer, born 1972) =

Italian footballer

Personal information
- Date of birth: 31 March 1972 (age 54)
- Place of birth: San Severino Marche, Italy
- Height: 1.87 m (6 ft 1 1/2 in)
- Position: Goalkeeper

Youth career
- Bari

Senior career*
Years	Team	Apps	(Gls)
1992–1998	Bari	3	(0)
1993–1994	→ Fasano (loan)	33	(0)
1994–1995	→ Barletta (loan)	6	(0)
1996–1997	→ Pistoiese (loan)	19	(0)
1998–1999	Acireale	25	(0)
1999–2000	Fasano	34	(0)
2000–2005	Catanzaro	100	(0)
2005	Palazzolo	9	(0)
2005–2006	Taranto	21	(0)
2006–2009	Maceratese	?	(?)
Total		250	(0)
- * Club domestic league appearances and goals

Luca Gentili (born 31 March 1972) is a former Italian footballer.

== Biography ==
Gentili was a youth product of Bari, which he made his league debut on 6 June 1993, that match Bari losing to Cremonese 1–2. After several loan spells, he left for Serie C1 club Acireale and then for Serie C2 club Fasano. In summer 2000 he was signed by Catanzaro and won promotion to Serie C1 in 2003 and Serie B in 2004, which the latter as the backup of Silvio Lafuenti. In January 2005, he was signed by Serie C2 side Palazzolo and then Taranto.

In summer 2006 he left for Serie D (non-professional) side Maceratese. He followed the hometown club relegated to Eccellenza Marche in 2009.

in June 2010, he became a goalkeeping coach (Italian: Preparatore portieri) of Nocerina.
