= Davide Carrus =

Italian footballer (born 1979)

Personal information
- Full name: Davide Carrus
- Date of birth: 19 March 1979 (age 47)
- Place of birth: Cagliari, Italy
- Height: 1.70 m (5 ft 7 in)
- Position: Midfielder

Youth career
- Sinnai
- Cagliari

Senior career*
| Years | Team | Apps | (Gls) |
| 1996–1998 | Cagliari | 1 | (0) |
| 1998–1999 | → Modena (loan) | 31 | (2) |
| 1999–2001 | Cagliari | 14 | (0) |
| 2001–2002 | → SPAL 1907 (loan) | 31 | (0) |
| 2002–2003 | Cagliari | 34 | (1) |
| 2003–2004 | Ancona | 16 | (0) |
| 2004 | Fiorentina | 5 | (1) |
| 2004–2007 | Bari | 84 | (18) |
| 2007–2009 | Bologna | 43 | (1) |
| 2009 | → Empoli (loan) | 12 | (0) |
| 2009–2010 | Mantova | 31 | (5) |
| 2010–2011 | Salernitana | 24 | (5) |
| 2011–2014 | Frosinone | 62 | (13) |
| 2014–2015 | Casertana | 23 | (0) |
| 2015–2016 | Pro Piacenza | 34 | (1) |
| 2016–2019 | Castiadas | | |
- * Club domestic league appearances and goals as of 25 September 2016

Davide Carrus (born 19 March 1979) is an Italian retired footballer who played as a midfielder.
