= Andrea Ardito =

Italian footballer (born 1977)

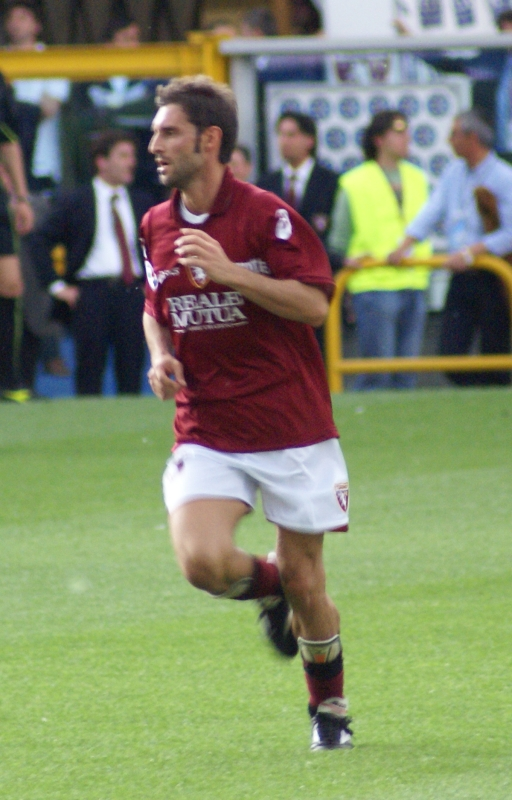

Personal information
- Date of birth: 8 January 1977 (age 49)
- Place of birth: Viareggio, Italy
- Height: 1.76 m (5 ft 9 1/2 in)
- Position: Midfielder

Youth career
- Pontedera

Senior career*
Years	Team	Apps	(Gls)
1994–1999	Pontedera	78	(1)
1995–1996	→ Camaiore (loan)	17	(1)
1999–2002	Como	68	(1)
2002	→ Bologna (loan)	0	(0)
2002–2005	Siena	47	(1)
2005–2007	Torino	61	(0)
2007–2009	Lecce	48	(0)
2009–2015	Como	133	(0)

Managerial career
- 2018–2019: Seregno
- 2019–2020: Milano City
- 2020: Giana Erminio (assistant)
- 2021: Castellanzese
- * Club domestic league appearances and goals

Andrea Ardito (born 8 January 1977) is an Italian football coach and a former player who played as a midfielder.

== Club career ==
Born in Viareggio, Tuscany, Ardito started his professional career at Tuscan club Pontedera. In 1999, he was signed by Como. The club won promotion to Serie A in 2002. However, he was signed by Bologna on 11 July 2002 in temporary deal. On 12 September 2002 he was signed by Siena in temporary deal. On 11 July 2003 the Tuscan side signed Ardito outright for €200,000.

Ardito made his Serie A debut for Siena on 31 August 2003, against Perugia. On 20 August 2005 Ardito was signed by Torino F.C. He won promotion to Serie A again with the Turin-based club in 2006.

In 2007, he was signed by Serie B club Lecce. In 2009, he returned to Como, for their Lega Pro Prima Divisione campaign.

== Coaching career ==
On 3 July 2021, he was hired as head coach of Serie D club Castellanzese. He was fired on 17 October 2021 after the club started the season with 5 losses in the first 6 games.
