= Emanuele Troise =

Italian footballer (born 1979)

Personal information
- Date of birth: 10 February 1979 (age 47)
- Place of birth: Volla, Italy
- Height: 1.82 m (6 ft 0 in)
- Position: Defender

Senior career*
Years	Team	Apps	(Gls)
1999–2003	Napoli	78	(1)
2003–2004	Bologna	10	(0)
2004–2007	Ternana	69	(1)
2007–2008	Salernitana	20	(0)
2008–2010	Panthrakikos	14	(0)
2010	Foggia	0	(0)
2010–2011	Cavese		
2011–2012	Città di Marino		

Managerial career
- 2020–2021: Mantova
- 2021–2023: Cavese
- 2023–2024: Rimini
- 2024–2025: Arezzo
- * Club domestic league appearances and goals

Emanuele Troise (born 10 February 1979) is an Italian football coach and a former player.

== Playing career ==
A defender, Troise started his professional career with Napoli, making his first team debut during the club's successful 1999–2000 Serie B campaign, and then making his Serie A debut the following season.

He successively played at the Serie A level with Bologna for a single season before moving down the leagues, also playing a stint at Super League Greece club Panthrakikos between 2008 and 2010.

== Coaching career ==
In 2012, Troise joined his former teammate Fabio Pecchia as his assistant at Latina. In 2014, he moved back to his former team Bologna as a technical collaborator, a role he left a year later to join Casertana as a youth coach.

In 2016, Troise returned to Bologna, this time as a youth coach, first in charge of the Under-17 team, then for the Under-19 Primavera team. On 7 August 2020, he was appointed head coach of newly-promoted Serie C club Mantova on what was his first role as a first-team manager in his career.

On 23 November 2021, he was hired by Serie D club Cavese. He left the club by the end of the 2022–23 season, after missing out on Serie C promotion to Brindisi.

On 11 October 2023, Troise returned to Serie C-level management, accepting the coaching job at Rimini. After completing the season with Rimini, he departed for fellow Serie C club Arezzo. He was dismissed on 2 February 2025.
