= Kennet Andersson =

Swedish footballer

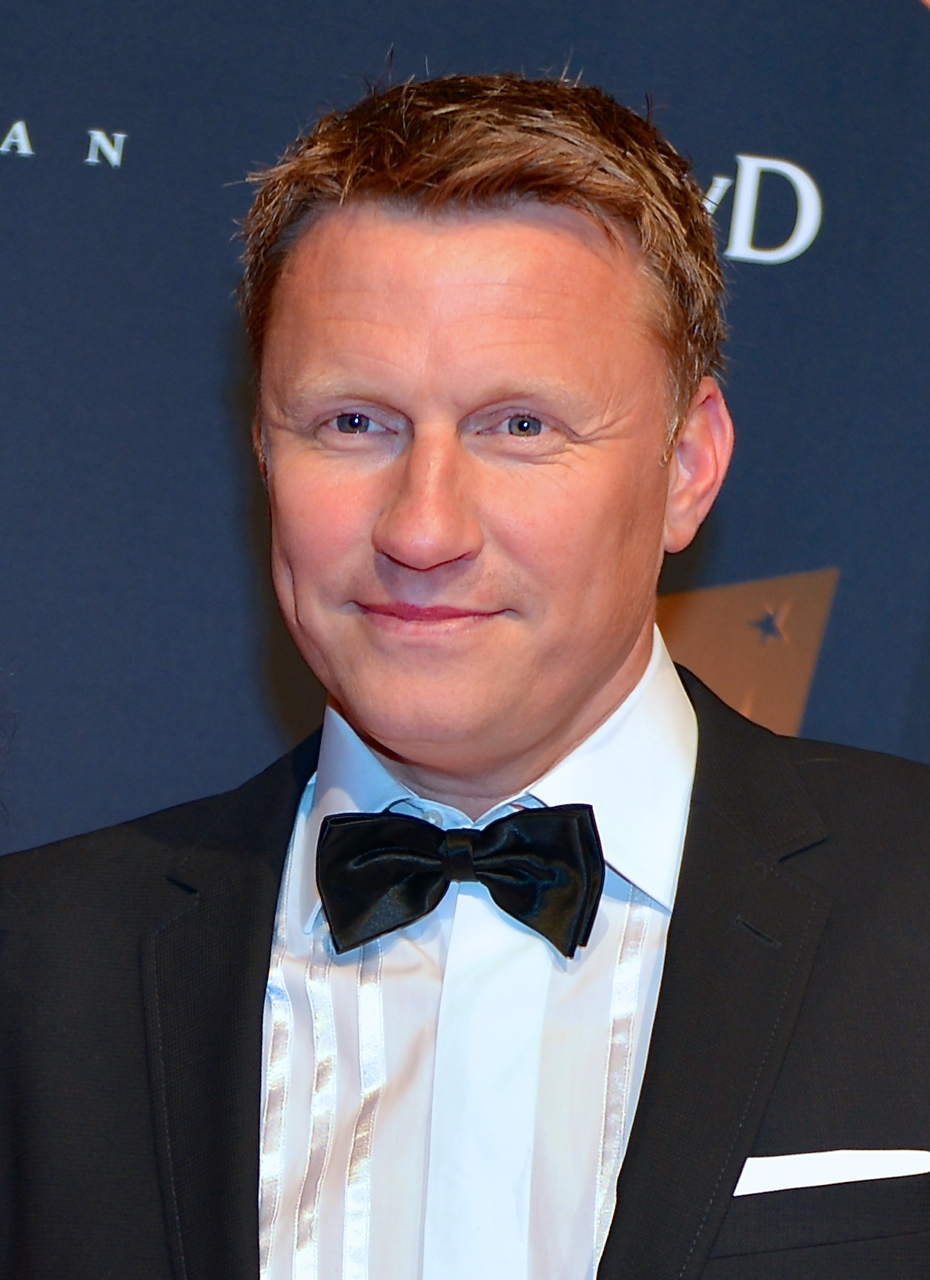
- Andersson at the 2014 Svenska idrottsgalan

Personal information
- Full name: Bernt Kennet Andersson
- Date of birth: 6 October 1967 (age 59)
- Place of birth: Eskilstuna, Sweden
- Height: 1.93 m (6 ft 4 in)
- Position: Forward

Youth career
- 1976–1981: Tunafors SK
- 1982–1984: IFK Eskilstuna

Senior career*
Years	Team	Apps	(Gls)
1985–1988	IFK Eskilstuna	76	(20)
1989–1991	IFK Göteborg	63	(29)
1991–1994	Mechelen	32	(7)
1993	→ IFK Norrköping (loan)	13	(8)
1993–1994	→ Lille (loan)	32	(11)
1994–1995	Caen	31	(9)
1995–1996	Bari	33	(12)
1996–1999	Bologna	86	(26)
1999	Lazio	2	(0)
1999–2000	Bologna	28	(7)
2000–2002	Fenerbahçe	56	(15)
2005	Gårda BK	18	(14)
Total		470	(158)

International career
1983	Sweden U16	4	(1)
1985–1986	Sweden U18	11	(1)
1988–1990	Sweden U21	14	(2)
1990–2000	Sweden	83	(31)
Medal record
Sweden
FIFA World Cup
Bronze medal – third place	1994
- * Club domestic league appearances and goals

Bernt Kennet Andersson (born 6 October 1967) is a Swedish former professional footballer who played as a forward. Starting off his career with IFK Eskilstuna in the mid-1980s, he went on to play professionally in Sweden, Belgium, France, Italy, and Turkey before retiring in 2002. A full international between 1990 and 2000, he won 83 caps and scored 31 goals for Sweden national team and was a key member of the Sweden team that finished third at the 1994 FIFA World Cup. He also represented Sweden at UEFA Euro 1992 and 2000.

== Club career ==
Andersson was born in Eskilstuna. At club level, he played for Tunafors SK (1976−1981), Eskilstuna (1982–88), Göteborg (1988–91), Mechelen (1991–92), Norrköping (1993), Lille (1993–94), Caen (1994–95), Bari (1995–96), Bologna (1996–99 and 1999–2000), Lazio (1999), Fenerbahçe (2000–02) and Gårda BK (2005).

== International career ==
For Sweden, Andersson made 83 appearances and scored 31 goals, both near the top in national history. He played in the 1992 and 2000 European Championships. He led the Swedish team in scoring with five goals in the 1994 World Cup, a feat which tied him for third place as the tournament's leading goalscorer. His physical size gave him an advantage in the air, and in this tournament he became known for towering over defenders to score goals with his head; in Sweden's quarter-final win over Romania, he headed in a vital goal by outjumping even the Romanian goalkeeper, Florin Prunea.

== Style of play ==
Andersson was considered one of the top-class strikers of his generation. A tall, athletic, and physically strong forward, who was also a prolific goalscorer, in spite of his lack of pace or notable technical skills, he was renowned for his work-rate, hold-up play with his back to goal, and in particular his excellent abilities in the air, which enabled him both to score goals with his head and get on the end of long balls to provide assists for his teammates from knock-downs; due to his playing style, he was frequently dubbed an "old-fashioned" centre-forward or "target-man" in the media throughout his career. BBC has described Andersson as "one of the world's greatest forwards in the air", adding that "his aerial ability is complemented by decent passing and unselfish support play that has allowed other strikers to flourish alongside him." Regarding his aerial prowess, Carlo Ancelotti described him as being "practically impossible" to mark in the air.

== Career statistics ==
=== International ===
Appearances and goals by national team and year
National team	Year	Apps	Goals
Sweden	1990	4	1
Sweden	1991	8	5
Sweden	1992	6	4
Sweden	1993	0	0
Sweden	1994	17	7
Sweden	1995	10	5
Sweden	1996	8	3
Sweden	1997	9	4
Sweden	1998	3	1
Sweden	1999	8	1
Sweden	2000	10	0
Total		83	31

Scores and results list Sweden's goal tally first, score column indicates score after each Andersson goal.

List of international goals scored by Kennet Andersson
No.	Date	Venue	Opponent	Score	Result	Competition
1	26 September 1990	Råsunda Stadium, Solna, Sweden	Bulgaria	2–0	2–0	Friendly
2	1 May 1991	Råsunda Stadium, Solna, Sweden	Austria	1–0	6–0	Friendly
3	1 May 1991	Råsunda Stadium, Solna, Sweden	Austria	2–0	6–0	Friendly
4	1 May 1991	Råsunda Stadium, Solna, Sweden	Austria	6–0	6–0	Friendly
5	5 June 1991	Råsunda Stadium, Solna, Sweden	Colombia	2–2	2–2	Friendly
6	15 June 1991	Idrottsparken, Norrköping, Sweden	Denmark	3–0	4–0	Scania 100 Tournament
7	22 April 1992	Stade El Menzah, Tunis, Tunisia	Tunisia	1–0	1–0	Friendly
8	7 May 1992	Råsunda Stadium, Solna, Sweden	Poland	1–0	5–0	Friendly
9	7 May 1992	Råsunda Stadium, Solna, Sweden	Poland	2–0	5–0	Friendly
10	21 June 1992	Råsunda Stadium, Solna, Sweden	Germany	2–3	2–3	UEFA Euro 1992
11	20 February 1994	Joe Robbie Stadium, Miami, Florida, United States	United States	2–1	3–1	Joe Robbie Cup
12	28 June 1994	Pontiac Silverdome, Pontiac, Michigan, United States	Brazil	1–0	1–1	1994 FIFA World Cup
13	3 July 1994	Cotton Bowl, Dallas, Texas, United States	Saudi Arabia	2–0	3–1	1994 FIFA World Cup
14	3 July 1994	Cotton Bowl, Dallas, Texas, United States	Saudi Arabia	3–1	3–1	1994 FIFA World Cup
15	10 July 1994	Stanford Stadium, Stanford, California, United States	Romania	2–2	2–2 (5–4 p)	1994 FIFA World Cup
16	16 July 1994	Rose Bowl, Pasadena, California, United States	Bulgaria	4–0	4–0	1994 FIFA World Cup
17	12 October 1994	Wankdorf Stadium, Bern, Switzerland	Switzerland	1–0	2–4	UEFA Euro 1996 qualifier
18	8 March 1995	Tsirion Stadium, Limassol, Cyprus	Cyprus	2–2	3–3	Friendly
19	29 March 1995	İnönü Stadium, Istanbul, Turkey	Turkey	1–0	1–2	UEFA Euro 1996 qualifier
20	8 June 1995	Elland Road, Leeds, England	England	3–1	3–3	Umbro Cup
21	10 June 1995	City Ground, Nottingham, England	Japan	1–1	2–2	Umbro Cup
22	10 June 1995	City Ground, Nottingham, England	Japan	2–1	2–2	Umbro Cup
23	1 June 1996	Råsunda Stadium, Solna, Sweden	Belarus	1–0	5–1	1998 FIFA World Cup qualifier
24	1 June 1996	Råsunda Stadium, Solna, Sweden	Belarus	3–0	5–1	1998 FIFA World Cup qualifier
25	1 September 1996	Daugava Stadium, Riga, Latvia	Latvia	2–0	2–1	1998 FIFA World Cup qualifier
26	30 April 1997	Ullevi, Gothenburg, Sweden	Scotland	1–0	2–1	1998 FIFA World Cup qualifier
27	30 April 1997	Ullevi, Gothenburg, Sweden	Scotland	2–0	2–1	1998 FIFA World Cup qualifier
28	8 June 1997	Kadriorg Stadium, Tallinn, Estonia	Estonia	3–0	3–2	1998 FIFA World Cup qualifier
29	20 August 1997	Dinamo Stadium, Minsk, Belarus	Belarus	1–1	2–1	1998 FIFA World Cup qualifier
30	2 June 1998	Ullevi, Gothenburg, Sweden	Italy	1–0	1–0	Friendly
31	9 October 1999	Råsunda Stadium, Solna, Sweden	Poland	1–0	2–0	UEFA Euro 2000 qualifier

== Honours ==
IFK Göteborg

- Allsvenskan: 1990, 1991
- Svenska Cupen: 1990–91

Bologna

- UEFA Intertoto Cup: 1998

Lazio

- UEFA Super Cup: 1999

Fenerbahçe

- 1. Lig: 2000–01

Sweden

- FIFA World Cup third place: 1994

Individual

- Allsvenskan top scorer: 1991
- FIFA World Cup Bronze Boot: 1994

== See also ==
- List of FIFA World Cup top goalscorers
