= Gérson Caçapa =

Brazilian footballer (born 1967)

Personal information
- Full name: Gérson Cândido de Paula
- Date of birth: 1 June 1967 (age 59)
- Place of birth: São Paulo, Brazil
- Height: 1.73 m (5 ft 8 in)
- Position: Midfielder

Senior career*
Years	Team	Apps	(Gls)
1985–1989	Palmeiras	62	(3)
1989–1991	Bari	64	(1)
1991–1993	→ Fenerbahçe (loan)	73	(26)
1993–1994	→ Lecce (loan)	31	(3)
1994–1996	Bari	59	(2)
1996–1997	İstanbulspor	31	(7)
1997–1998	Atlético Paranaense	19	(0)
- * Club domestic league appearances and goals

Gérson Cândido de Paula (born 1 June 1967), known as Gérson Caçapa, is a Brazilian former professional footballer, who played as a midfielder, usually as an attacking midfielder. Gérson Caçapa played for Sociedade Esportiva Palmeiras and Clube Atlético Paranaense in the Campeonato Brasileiro. and played for A.S. Bari in Italy for Serie A and U.S. Lecce for Serie B. He also had a spell with Fenerbahçe S.K. and Istanbulspor in the Turkish Süper Lig.

== Honours ==
Palmeiras

- Taça dos Invictos: 1989

Bari

- Mitropa Cup: 1990

Fenerbahçe

- Chancellor Cup: 1992–93

Atlético Paranaense

- Campeonato Paranaense: 1998
- Parana Cup: 1998
