= Luigi Malafronte =

Italian footballer

Personal information
- Date of birth: 2 December 1978 (age 47)
- Place of birth: Pompei, Italy
- Height: 1.72 m (5 ft 8 in)
- Position: Defender

Youth career
- Napoli

Senior career*
Years	Team	Apps	(Gls)
1997–2001	Napoli	16	(0)
2000–2001	→ Benevento (loan)	45	(0)
2001–2005	Roma	0	(0)
2001–2002	→ Palermo (loan)	5	(0)
2002–2003	→ Paternò (loan)	21	(0)
2003–2004	→ Taranto (loan)	8	(1)
2004–2005	→ Olbia (loan)	9	(1)
2005–2006	Ancona	19	(0)
2006–2008	Potenza	20	(0)
2009–	Pisticci	?	(?)
Total		143	(2)
- * Club domestic league appearances and goals

Luigi Malafronte (born 2 December 1978) is an Italian former footballer who last played for Pisticci.

== Biography ==
Born in Pompei, the Province of Naples, Malafronte started his career at S.S.C. Napoli where he made his Serie A debut in 1997–98 season.

In summer 2001, he joined A.S. Roma, signed a contract until June 2005, swapped club with Marco Quadrini directly without cash, but immediately loan to sister club Palermo. He made his club debut on 1 February 2002, against Pistoiese. He replaced Marco Aurélio in the 75th minutes, and the match the Sicily side won 2–0. Malafronte originally joined Palermo in co-ownership in July 2002. But after Franco Sensi sold the club that month, the deal was canceled. He then 3 seasons on loan at Serie C1 and C2 clubs. In summer 2005, he joined Serie C2 side Ancona. In the next season he moved to Potenza, also at Serie C2.

In 2009–10 season he was signed by Serie D side Pisticci.
