= Dario Baccin =

Italian footballer (born 1976)

Personal information
- Full name: Dario Baccin
- Date of birth: 27 August 1976 (age 50)
- Place of birth: Novara, Italy
- Height: 1.83 m (6 ft 0 in)
- Position: Defender

Team information
- Current team: Palermo (technical coordinator)

Senior career*
Years	Team	Apps	(Gls)
1994–1998	Juventus	0	(0)
1996–1997	→ Cesena (loan)	28	(0)
1997–1998	→ Chievo (loan)	15	(1)
1998–2000	Ternana	55	(1)
2000–2002	Napoli	39	(2)
2002	Al-Ittihad Tripoli		
2003–2004	Ancona	5	(0)
2003	→ Taranto (loan)	0	(0)
2004	→ Ascoli (loan)	7	(0)
2004–2007	Rimini	99	(3)
2007–2009	Treviso	45	(1)
2009–2010	Rimini	18	(0)
- * Club domestic league appearances and goals as of June 2009

Dario Baccin (born 27 August 1976) is a former Italian footballer.

== Club career ==
Baccin made his Serie A debut on 30 September against Juventus. In mid-1998 Baccin was sold to Ternana in co-ownership deal along with Corrado Grabbi for a total fee of 2.35 (short) billion lire (€1.21 million). In mid-2000 S.S.C. Napoli acquired Baccin from Ternana for 2.5 billion lire. (€1,291,142) In June 2002 Baccin was bought back by Juve. However, he was immediately sold to Libya for Al-Ittihad for €1.523 million. Just after 6 months Baccin returned to Italy for Ancona. However, he failed to play any game. In January 2004 Baccin left for Ascoli in another temporary deal. In mid-2004 Baccin left for Rimini.

After Treviso were declared bankrupt and relegated, he rejoined Rimini in July 2009.

== Post-playing career ==
After retirement, he opted to stay into football and graduated as "director of football" at the Coverciano school in December 2010. In February 2011, he was hired by Siena as a scout under experienced director of football Giorgio Perinetti, filling this role until June 2012. On 26 June 2012, he was announced to have re-united with Perinetti at Palermo, where he will serve as technical coordinator for the club's youth system.
