= Vlado Šmit =

Serbian footballer and manager

Personal information
- Date of birth: 6 April 1980 (age 46)
- Place of birth: Sremska Mitrovica, SR Serbia, SFR Yugoslavia
- Height: 1.80 m (5 ft 11 in)
- Position: Left-back

Youth career
- –1997: Vojvodina

Senior career*
Years	Team	Apps	(Gls)
1997–1998	Vrbas	19	(1)
1998–1999	Vojvodina	0	(0)
1999–2000	Vrbas	17	(1)
2000–2001	Milicionar	23	(2)
2001–2002	Železnik	16	(1)
2002	→ Bologna (loan)	0	(0)
2002–2007	Bologna	55	(2)
2003–2004	→ Atalanta (loan)	24	(0)
2005	→ Pescara (loan)	10	(0)
2007–2009	Treviso	50	(2)
2009–2010	Gallipoli	4	(0)
2010–2012	SPAL	33	(8)
2012	Cagliari	0	(0)
2012–2018	Triglav Kranj	111	(13)
Total		362	(30)

International career
1997–1998	FR Yugoslavia U18 (Note: Only official UEFA matches included)	8	(0)
2000–2001	FR Yugoslavia U21	3	(0)

Managerial career
- 2018–2019: Triglav Kranj (assistant)
- 2019–2020: Triglav Kranj
- 2020–2021: Çaykur Rizespor (assistant)
- 2022: Sava Kranj
- 2022: Göztepe (assistant)
- 2022: Sheriff Tiraspol (assistant)
- 2023: Osijek (assistant)
- 2026: Oțelul Galați (assistant)
- * Club domestic league appearances and goals

Vlado Šmit (Serbian Cyrillic: Владо Шмит; born 6 April 1980) is a Serbian professional football manager and former player.

== Club career ==
Born in Sremska Mitrovica, Šmit made his senior debut with Vrbas in the 1997–98 season, helping the club win promotion to the Second League of FR Yugoslavia. He then spent one year at Vojvodina, failing to make any appearance for their first squad. Afterwards, Šmit moved back to his former club Vrbas, scoring once in 17 league appearances during the 1999–2000 season.

In summer 2000, Šmit switched to Milicionar, making his First League of FR Yugoslavia debut in the 2000–01 season. He then spent six months with Železnik, before moving on loan to Italian club Bologna in January 2002. After a six-month period, Šmit signed a four-year contract with Bologna in the summer of 2002. He subsequently played at Serie A and Serie B level with Atalanta, Pescara and Treviso. In August 2009, after spending two months without a team following Treviso's exclusion from professional football, Šmit accepted an offer to join newly promoted Serie B side Gallipoli. He eventually switched to SPAL in January 2010.

In summer 2012, Šmit moved to Slovenia and signed with Triglav Kranj. He spent the following six seasons with the club, collecting 111 league appearances and scoring 13 goals in the process.

== International career ==
Šmit has represented FR Yugoslavia at both the under-18 and under-21 levels in UEFA competitions.

== Honours ==
=== Player ===
Triglav Kranj

- 2. SNL: 2016–17
