= Francesco Baldini =

Italian footballer (born 1974)

Personal information
- Date of birth: 14 March 1974 (age 52)
- Place of birth: Massa, Italy
- Height: 1.84 m (6 ft 0 in)
- Position: Centre-back

Senior career*
Years	Team	Apps	(Gls)
1991–1993	Massese	19	(0)
1993–1994	Juventus	3	(0)
1994–1995	Massese	32	(0)
1995–2003	Napoli	168	(1)
2001–2002	→ Roma (loan)	9	(0)
2003–2006	Genoa	73	(4)
2006–2007	Perugia	23	(2)
2007–2008	Lugano	16	(0)
2008–2010	San Marino	42	(3)

International career
1993	Italy Olympic	0	(0)

Managerial career
- 2014–2015: Sestri Levante
- 2015: Lucchese
- 2016: Lucchese
- 2019: Trapani
- 2021–2022: Catania
- 2022: Vicenza
- 2023: Perugia
- 2024: Trento
- 2024: Lecco
- 2025: SPAL
- * Club domestic league appearances and goals

Francesco Baldini (born 14 March 1974) is an Italian football coach and a former player who played as a defender.

== Club career ==
Throughout his club career, Baldini played for Italian clubs Massese, Juventus, Napoli, Roma, Genoa, Perugia, as well as San Marino.

== International career ==
At the international level, Baldini was called up to the Italian Under-21 Olympic squad for the 1993 Mediterranean Games but did not make any appearances for the side.

== Coaching career ==
In 2011, Baldini obtained a UEFA A License, making him eligible to coach Lega Pro teams.

He successfully started a youth coach career with Bologna, where he worked from 2011 to 2014. He then took his first head coaching role at the helm of Serie D amateurs Sestri Levante for the 2014–15 season, obtaining second place in the league and later winning the national playoff tournament.

In June 2015, he was named the new head coach of Lucchese. However, he was fired in October 2015 due to poor results; he was rehired in February 2016 and then dismissed once again on 6 March.

After his Lucchese experience, Baldini returned to youth coaching, first as head coach of the Under-17 team at Roma and then as the Primavera Under-19 coach at Juventus.

On 11 July 2019, he was announced as the new head coach of Serie B club Trapani. Trapani dismissed him on 17 December 2019.

On 19 March 2021, he was announced as the new head coach of Serie C club Catania for the remainder of the season. He guided the Rossazzurri during a financially troubled season, which was cut short in April 2022 as Catania were excluded from the league after having been declared insolvent. Just a few days later, he was hired by relegation-battling Serie B club Vicenza as their new head coach with immediate effect.

Baldini failed to save Vicenza from relegation after losing to Cosenza in the playoffs but was confirmed in charge of the Biancorossi for the 2022–23 Serie C campaign. However, following a negative start to the club's season, he was eventually dismissed on 7 November 2022.

On 17 July 2023, Perugia announced the appointment of Baldini as their new head coach. He was dismissed on 19 December 2023 due to poor results.

On 12 February 2024, Baldini was hired as the new head coach of relegation-battling Serie C club Trento until the end of the season. After guiding Trento to a promotion playoff spot, Baldini parted ways with the club by the end of the season.

On 27 June 2024, Baldini was announced as the new head coach of Lecco following the club's relegation to Serie C and a subsequent takeover by new ownership. He was dismissed with his entire coaching staff on 28 October 2024, following a disappointing start to the season below the club's expectations.

On 4 February 2025, Baldini took over at Serie C club SPAL, replacing Andrea Dossena. Despite saving the club from relegation, he found himself unemployed following SPAL's exclusion from the league due to financial struggles.
