= Igor Protti =

Italian footballer (1967–2026)

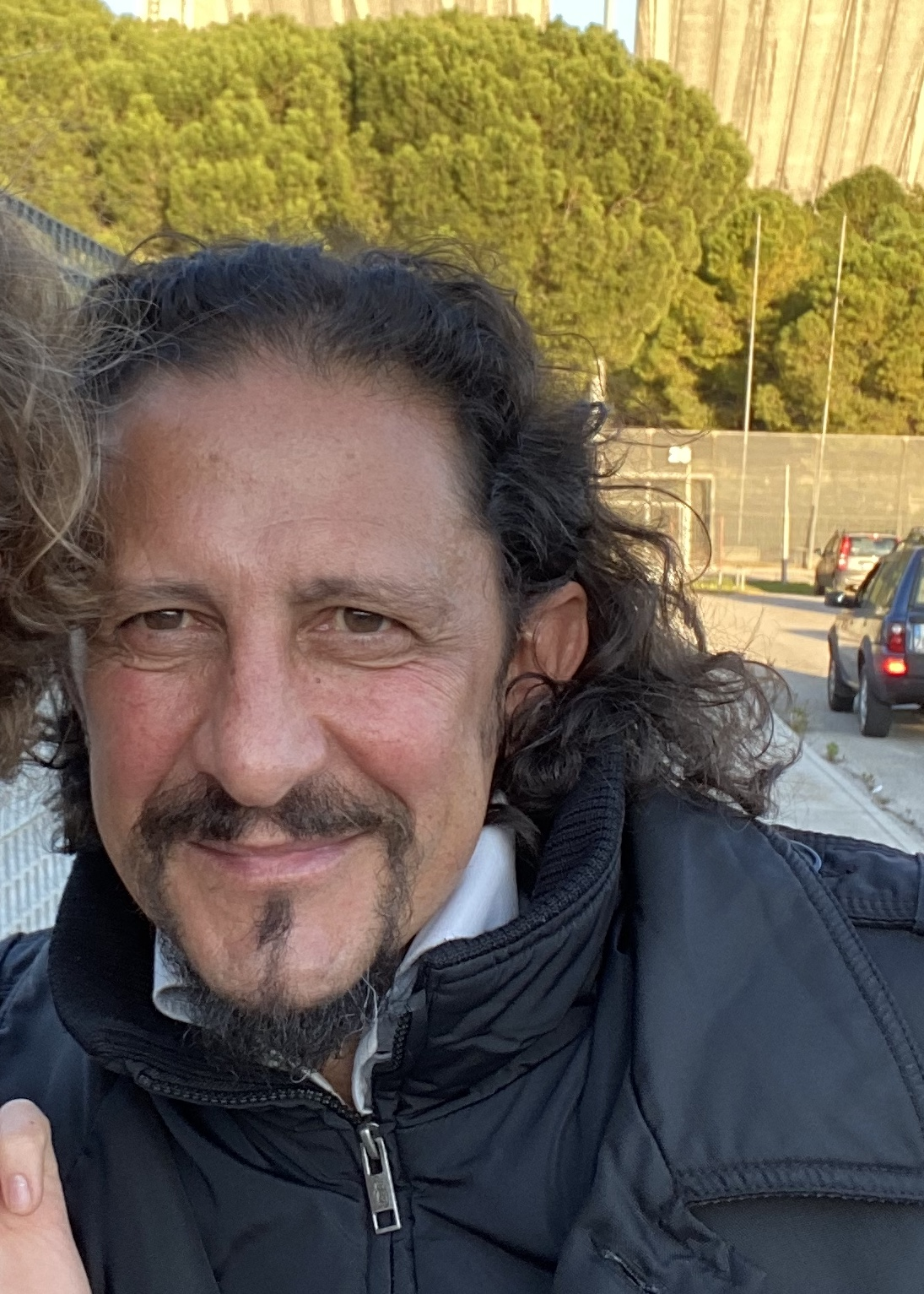
- Protti in 2020

Personal information
- Date of birth: 24 September 1967
- Place of birth: Rimini, Italy
- Date of death: 19 June 2026 (aged 58)
- Place of death: Livorno, Italy
- Height: 1.71 m (5 ft 7 in)
- Position: Striker

Senior career*
Years	Team	Apps	(Gls)
1983–1985	Rimini	7	(0)
1985–1988	Livorno	75	(12)
1988–1989	Virescit Bergamo	31	(10)
1989–1992	Messina	105	(31)
1992–1996	Bari	112	(46)
1996–1998	Lazio	29	(7)
1997–1998	→ Napoli (loan)	27	(4)
1998–1999	Reggiana	24	(8)
1999–2005	Livorno	192	(108)
Total		602	(226)
- * Club domestic league appearances and goals

Igor Protti (24 September 1967 – 19 June 2026) was an Italian professional footballer. Along with Dario Hübner, he is the only player to have won the top scoring titles in Serie A, Serie B, and Serie C1.

Throughout his playing career, he made a name for himself as a prolific and opportunistic striker, who mainly operated in the penalty area. Protti started his career with his hometown club Rimini in 1983; although he played for several Italian club sides throughout his career, including Lazio and Napoli, he is mostly remembered for his time with Livorno, where he established himself as a legendary figure in the club's history during his second spell with the side, and eventually remained with the team until his retirement. Protti is the only Serie A top-scorer to have suffered relegation with his club (Bari, at the time).

After his retirement from playing he worked as the general manager for Livorno.

== Playing career ==
Protti spent the majority of his early career playing for teams in lower divisions; he made his career debut in Serie C1 at the age of 16, with his home-town club Rimini, on 27 May 1984. After two seasons with the club, he later moved on to Livorno in 1985, for three seasons. After a season period with Virescit Bergamo, he was acquired by Messina in 1989, and he became an important figure with the club, making his Serie B debut with Messina, and scoring 31 goals over three seasons.

In 1992, he moved to Bari, and after two seasons in Serie B, he helped his team to achieve Serie A promotion. During the 1994–95 season, he scored his first goal in Serie A against Napoli, as well as his first ever hat-trick, against Lazio. He came to more widespread notice during the 1995–96 Serie A season, in which he shared the top-scoring title with Giuseppe Signori, scoring 24 goals (including a brace against Inter), despite his team, Bari, being relegated. This achievement led to a move to Lazio in 1996, but Protti's stay with the Rome club was not successful, and after two seasons with the club, including a loan to Napoli during the 1997–98 season, he was eventually released from his contract in 1998.

After a spell in Serie B at Reggiana (1998–99), helping the club to Serie A promotion, Protti returned to Livorno in Serie C1 in 1999, where he rapidly became one of the most popular players in that club's history, scoring 11 goals during his first season with the club. He later captained Livorno, leading the club to Serie B promotion during the 2001–02 Serie C1 season, winning the title, and finishing the campaign as the top-scorer, and the following season he was the top-scorer in Serie B. He subsequently led Livorno to Serie A promotion during the 2003–04 season, before retiring in 2005 after the team had finished a surprising 9th in their first top division campaign in many years, leaving the captain's armband to Cristiano Lucarelli. Protti's number 10 was then retired by the club. He was also given the freedom of the city of Livorno in 2007. During the awarding ceremony, he asked the #10 jersey not to be retired any longer in order to "give anybody back the dream to dress it one day". The number was to be reassigned starting from the 2007–08 season, with Francesco Tavano wearing the number 10 shirt.

== Post-playing career ==
In June 2015, Protti was hired as the new director of football of Tuttocuoio, with former Livorno teammate Cristiano Lucarelli as head coach. They were both relieved of their roles in April 2016.

In June 2016, Protti returned to Livorno as a "club manager". He left Livorno by the end of the 2018–19 season. He returned to work with Livorno as a "club manager" in August 2021, following the club's exclusion from Serie D and successive admission to Eccellenza under a new property. In July 2022, Protti was promoted as general manager.

== Death ==
Protti died on 19 June 2026, after battling colon cancer that spread to his spine. He was 58.

Thousands of supporters filled the stadium in Livorno and Bari to mark his death. His ashes were transported to the stadium and commemorated by Livorno fans.

== Honours ==
Lazio

- Supercoppa Italiana: 1998

Livorno

- Serie C1: 2001–02

Individual

- Serie A top scorer: 1995–96 (24 goals, along with Giuseppe Signori)
- Serie B top scorer: 2002–03 (23 goals)
- Serie C1 top scorer: 2000–01 (20 goals), 2001–02 (27 goals)
