= Fabrizio Ficini =

Italian football midfielder

Personal information
- Date of birth: 11 October 1973 (age 53)
- Place of birth: Empoli, Italy
- Height: 1.79 m (5 ft 10 in)
- Position: Midfielder

Youth career
- Empoli

Senior career*
Years	Team	Apps	(Gls)
1990–1995	Empoli	40	(0)
1995–1996	Bari	21	(0)
1996–1998	Empoli	65	(0)
1998	Sampdoria	9	(0)
1999	Fiorentina	13	(0)
1999–2000	Sampdoria	37	(0)
2001–2007	Empoli	146	(0)
- * Club domestic league appearances and goals as of 29 December 2008

Fabrizio Ficini (born 11 October 1973 in Empoli) is an Italian former football (soccer) midfielder. He played for Montemurlo Calcio.
