= Claudio Bellucci =

Italian footballer (born 1975)

Personal information
- Date of birth: 31 May 1975 (age 51)
- Place of birth: Rome, Italy
- Height: 1.72 m (5 ft 8 in)
- Position: Striker

Team information
- Current team: Cagliari (youth coach)

Youth career
- Lodigiani
- Sampdoria

Senior career*
Years	Team	Apps	(Gls)
1993–1996	Sampdoria	39	(3)
1994–1995	→ Fiorenzuola (loan)	7	(0)
1996–1997	Venezia	33	(20)
1997–2001	Napoli	91	(24)
2001–2007	Bologna	184	(65)
2007–2010	Sampdoria	59	(18)
2010	→ Livorno (loan)	14	(1)
2010–2011	Modena	16	(3)
Total		443	(134)

International career
1997	Italy U21	6	(1)

Managerial career
- 2014–2015: Sampdoria Primavera (assistant)
- 2017: Arezzo
- 2018–2019: Albissola
- * Club domestic league appearances and goals

Claudio Bellucci (born 31 May 1975) is an Italian former professional footballer who played as a striker and current manager.

== Playing career ==
Bellucci started his career with Sampdoria, making his Serie A debut against A.C. Milan on 13 March 1994, at the age of 18. He made one more appearance for the Genoa-based side, before being loaned to Fiorenzuola of Serie C1. In his first game after his return to Sampdoria, on 20 April 1995, he scored two goals in the 83rd and 86th minute of the 1994–95 UEFA Cup Winners' Cup return leg semifinal against Arsenal. Arsenal, who won the first leg 3–2, reached to score two minutes before the end of the match, and eventually won the subsequent penalty shootout. He then left for Venezia of Serie B.

=== Napoli ===
Bellucci stayed at Venice for only one season, before signing for Napoli. He followed the club's relegation to Serie B in summer 1998, and after two seasons, they regained promotion to the top flight. When Napoli were once again relegated, he transferred to Bologna.

=== Bologna ===
Bellucci signed a contract extension in September 2004. He followed Bologna to Serie B in summer 2005, in which he scored 25 and 19 goals, became the second highest goal scorers of the two successive seasons.

=== Return to Sampdoria ===
Bellucci returned to Sampdoria on 15 June 2007 on a free transfer. He signed a two-year contract with an option for a further year.

He scored 12 goals in 32 Serie A games in 2007–08 Serie A but ruptured his right Achilles tendon on 21 May 2008, in the 2–0 win over Palermo. Bellucci returned to action in October but found limited opportunities due to the rise in importance of Antonio Cassano and the mid-season signing of Giampaolo Pazzini. In the 2009–10 season, he made 8 league appearances, three of them coming as a starter.

=== Livorno ===
On 19 January 2010, Livorno signed Bellucci from Sampdoria on loan.

=== Modena ===
On 10 September 2010, Bellucci signed a contract from Modena on a free transfer.

== Coaching career ==
After retirement at the end of the 2010–11 season, Bellucci retired and became a youth coach at his former club A.S. Lodigiani. He worked there until July 2013, where he was named as the new youth coach of the Giovanissimi Regionali team of Sampdoria in 2013, and then becoming a co-coach of the Primavera team (together with Enrico Chiesa) the following year. In 2015, he became a part of Walter Zenga's staff for the first team of Sampdoria, a job he left with the appointment of Vincenzo Montella as new head coach and his demotion as youth coach. He left Sampdoria in 2017 to become the new head coach of Serie C club Arezzo, a position he kept only for the first four weeks of the season.

In October 2018, he was named new head coach of Serie C minnows Albissola, at the bottom place of the league table in their first season as a professional club. Belucci was fired on 4 March 2019.

On 15 September 2021, Bellucci was appointed Walter Mazzarri's new assistant coach at Serie A club Cagliari. He was dismissed from his role on 3 May 2022, one day after Mazzarri's sacking.

In September 2023, Bellucci returned to Cagliari, this time as head of the Under-18 youth team.
