= Roberto Goretti =

Italian footballer (born 1976)

Personal information
- Date of birth: 28 May 1976 (age 50)
- Place of birth: Perugia, Italy
- Height: 1.84 m (6 ft 0 in)
- Position: Midfielder

Senior career*
Years	Team	Apps	(Gls)
1995–1997	Perugia	61	(4)
1997–2000	Napoli	34	(1)
2000–2003	Bologna	11	(0)
2000–2001	→ Perugia (loan)	6	(0)
2003–2004	Reggiana	31	(3)
2004	Ancona	13	(0)
2004–2006	Bari	52	(4)
2006–2008	Arezzo	49	(0)
2008–2009	Como	26	(1)
2009–2010	Foggia	16	(1)
2010	Como	11	(0)
2010–2011	Perugia	14	(4)
- * Club domestic league appearances and goals

Roberto Goretti (born 28 May 1976) is an Italian professional football technical director and former player, who is the technical director of Reggiana. He played as a midfielder.

Goretti spent most of his career at Serie B, and also played 85 Serie A matches.

== Club career ==
Goretti started his career at hometown club Perugia, where he won promotion to Serie A in 1996. After Perugia were relegated in 1997, he was signed by Napoli, who in next season faced another relegation. In the next one-and-a-half Serie B seasons, Goretti only played eight league matches, before joining Bologna of Serie A in mid-season. He only played 11 league matches in two Serie A seasons, before joined Serie C1 side Reggiana in January 2003.

After having played two-and-a-half seasons, he left for Serie A side Ancona. In 2004, he signed for Serie B side Bari. In 2006, he was signed by Arezzo of Serie B, where he played 10 games as a starter in 22 league appearances. Arezzo were then relegated to Serie C1, where Goretti played one more season. He terminated his contract with the club in May 2008.

In 2008, he was signed by Como of Lega Pro Seconda Divisione, where he won the promotion play-offs. In 2009, Goretti signed a one-year contract with Foggia. In mid-season, he returned to Como. In the 2010–11 season, Goretti returned to Perugia again, winning promotion back to the professional league.

== Managing career ==
In 2012, Goretti became technical director of Perugia's youth sector. In 2022, he was made technical director of Reggiana.
