= Emanuele Brioschi =

Italian football defender (born 1975)

Personal information
- Date of birth: 23 June 1975 (age 51)
- Place of birth: Milan, Italy
- Height: 1.84 m (6 ft 0 in)
- Position: Defender

Senior career*
Years	Team	Apps	(Gls)
1992–1993	Solbiatese	12	(0)
1993–1996	Bari	16	(0)
1996–2000	Venezia	93	(5)
2000–2002	Bologna	48	(3)
2002–2003	Cosenza	14	(0)
2003–2006	Bari	81	(2)
2006–2007	Bologna	28	(2)
2007–2008	Cremonese	25	(6)
2008–2010	Como	35	(1)
- * Club domestic league appearances and goals

Emanuele Brioschi (born 23 June 1975) is an Italian former football defender.

His professional career began in Serie A with Bari in the 1993–94 season, and he later played with Venezia (1998–2000) and Bologna (2000–2002) for a total of 107 matches. He scored three goals, all with Bologna.
