= 1997–98 SS Lazio season =

Lazio
1997–98 season
- Owner: Sergio Cragnotti
- President: Dino Zoff
- Manager: Sven-Göran Eriksson
- Stadium: Stadio Olimpico
- Serie A: 7th
- Coppa Italia: Winners
- UEFA Cup: Runners-up
- Top goalscorer: League: Pavel Nedvěd (11); All: Alen Bokšić, Pavel Nedvěd (15)
Home colours	Away colours	Third colours

The 1997–98 season was Società Sportiva Lazio's 98th season in their existence and their tenth consecutive season in the top-flight of Italian football.

== Season review ==
Lazio appointed a new coach in Sven-Göran Eriksson, snatching the Swede from an almost readied contract with Blackburn Rovers. Ex-Sampdoria man Eriksson brought playmaking secondary striker Roberto Mancini with him. In addition, he signed Vladimir Jugović and Alen Bokšić from Juventus, with Bokšić embarking on a second tenure at Lazio. Matias Almeyda also arrived at the club from Spanish side Sevilla, while wing-back Giuseppe Pancaro, signed from Cagliari, also proved to be a key player.

The new players managed to form an effective unit that was involved in the battle for the title until the 28th round, when they lost 1–0 at home to Juventus in a game that turned the tide for Lazio.

The loss to Juventus led to a poor run of one point in six matches, dropping the team down to seventh. It was the club's worst league position for more than five years, but Eriksson was saved by the fact that the team had been seriously in the hunt for the scudetto (title) and reached the finals of both the Coppa Italia and the UEFA Cup. Lazio won the Coppa Italia but lost to Inter in the UEFA Cup final 3–0.

The 1997–98 season also saw the departure of club legend Giuseppe Signori, who failed to get on with Eriksson and was sold to Sampdoria as a long-overdue replacement for Mancini. Given the team's strong form at the time, his departure did not cause the same riots as happened when he was on the verge of being sold to Parma in 1995.

1997-98 was a successful season for Pavel Nedvěd, the Czech winger scoring eleven goals and gaining confidence from Eriksson.

== Players ==
=== Squad information ===
Squad at end of season

Note: Flags indicate national team as defined under FIFA eligibility rules; some limited exceptions apply. Players may hold more than one non-FIFA nationality.

No.	Pos.	Nation	Player
1	GK	ITA	Luca Marchegiani
2	DF	ITA	Paolo Negro
3	DF	ITA	Giovanni Lopez
4	MF	ITA	Dario Marcolin
5	DF	ITA	Giuseppe Favalli
6	DF	ARG	José Chamot
7	MF	ITA	Roberto Rambaudi
9	FW	ITA	Pierluigi Casiraghi
10	FW	ITA	Roberto Mancini
12	GK	ITA	Fernando Orsi
13	DF	ITA	Alessandro Nesta
14	MF	ITA	Diego Fuser
15	DF	ITA	Giuseppe Pancaro

No.	Pos.	Nation	Player
16	MF	AUS	Paul Okon
17	DF	SUI	Guerino Gottardi
18	MF	CZE	Pavel Nedvěd
19	FW	CRO	Alen Bokšić
20	DF	ITA	Alessandro Grandoni
21	MF	YUG	Vladimir Jugović
22	GK	ITA	Marco Ballotta
23	MF	ITA	Giorgio Venturin
25	MF	ARG	Matías Almeyda
26	DF	ITA	Mauro Di Lello
27	MF	ITA	Mirko Laurentini
28	DF	ITA	Maurizio Domizzi

=== Transfers ===
In
Pos.	Name	from	Type
FW	Roberto Mancini	Sampdoria	
MF	Vladimir Jugović	Juventus	
FW	Alen Bokšić	Juventus	
MF	Matías Almeyda	Sevilla FC	
DF	Giovanni Lopez	Vicenza Calcio	
DF	Giuseppe Pancaro	Cagliari Calcio	
GK	Marco Ballotta	A.C. Reggiana	
GK	Flavio Roma	Fiorenzuola	loan ended
MF	Daniele Franceschini	Castel di Sangro	loan ended
FW	Marco Di Vaio	A.S. Bari	loan ended
FW	Alessandro Iannuzzi	Vicenza Calcio	loan ended

Out
Pos.	Name	To	Type
DF	Mark Fish	Bolton Wanderers	
FW	Marco Di Vaio	Salernitana	
GK	Carlo Cudicini	Castel di Sangro	end of contract
MF	Marco Piovanelli	Piacenza Calcio	co-ownership
FW	Igor Protti	S.S.C. Napoli	loan
GK	Flavio Roma	Foggia Calcio	loan
MF	Roberto Baronio	Vicenza Calcio	loan
MF	Daniele Franceschini	Foggia Calcio	loan
FW	Alessandro Iannuzzi	Lecce	loan

==== Autumn ====
In
Pos.	Name	from	Type

Out
Pos.	Name	To	Type
FW	Renato Buso	Piacenza Calcio	
FW	Giuseppe Signori	Sampdoria	co-ownership

== Competitions ==
=== Serie A ===
==== League table ====
Pos	Team	Pld	W	D	L	GF	GA	GD	Pts	Qualification or relegation
5	Fiorentina	34	15	12	7	65	36	+29	57 (Note: Fiorentina finished ahead of Parma on head-to-head points: FIO 1–1 PAR; PAR 1–2 FIO.)	Qualification to UEFA Cup
6	Parma	34	15	12	7	55	39	+16	57	Qualification to UEFA Cup
7	Lazio	34	16	8	10	53	30	+23	56	Qualification to Cup Winners' Cup
8	Bologna	34	12	12	10	55	46	+9	48 (Note: Bologna finished ahead of Sampdoria on head-to-head points: BOL 2–2 SAM; SAM 2–3 BOL.)	Qualification to Intertoto Cup third round
9	Sampdoria	34	13	9	12	52	55	−3	48	Qualification to Intertoto Cup second round

Source: 1997–98 Serie A, RSSSF.com, Soccerway
Rules for classification: 1) Points; 2) Head-to-head points; 3) Head-to-head goal difference; 4) Goal difference; 5) Goals scored; 6) Draw. (Note: Head-to-head record is used only after all the matches between the teams in question have been played).

==== Results summary ====
Overall								Home						Away					
Pld	W	D	L	GF	GA	GD	Pts	W	D	L	GF	GA	GD	W	D	L	GF	GA	GD
34	16	8	10	53	30	+23	56	11	1	5	32	16	+16	5	7	5	21	14	+7

==== Results by round ====
Round	1	2	3	4	5	6	7	8	9	10	11	12	13	14	15	16	17	18	19	20	21	22	23	24	25	26	27	28	29	30	31	32	33	34
Ground	H	A	A	H	A	H	A	H	A	H	A	H	H	A	H	A	H	A	H	H	A	H	A	H	A	H	A	H	A	A	H	A	H	A
Result	W	D	L	W	D	L	W	W	D	L	L	W	W	D	W	W	W	D	W	W	W	W	D	W	W	D	W	L	D	L	L	L	L	L
Position	1	3	8	6	6	9	5	5	6	6	9	7	6	7	5	5	4	4	4	3	3	2	3	2	2	3	3	3	3	3	3	4	5	7

Source: Competitive matches
A = Away; H = Home; W = Win; D = Draw; L = Loss; P = Postponed; = Leader, 1998–99 UEFA Champions League Group stage; = 1998–99 UEFA Champions League Qualifying round; = 1998–99 UEFA Cup; = 1998 UEFA Intertoto Cup; = 1998–99 Serie B; R = 1998–99 UEFA Cup Winners' Cup

==== Matches ====
31 August 1997 1	Lazio	2–0	Napoli	Rome
15:00 CEST (UTC+02:00)	Casiraghi (penalty missed) 45'; R. Mancini 68'; Pancaro 76'	Report		Stadium: Stadio Olimpico; Attendance: 55,739; Referee: Stefano Braschi

13 September 1997 2	Milan	1–1	Lazio	Milan
15:00 CEST (UTC+02:00)	Ba 37'	Report	Signori 90+4' (pen.)	Stadium: San Siro; Attendance: 67,151; Referee: Piero Ceccarini

21 September 1997 3	Empoli	1–0	Lazio	Empoli
15:00 CEST (UTC+02:00)	Martusciello 11'	Report	Jugović (red card) 49'; Signori (penalty missed) 79'	Stadium: Stadio Carlo Castellani; Attendance: 12,799; Referee: Cosimo Bolognino

27 September 1997 4	Lazio	3–2	Bari	Rome
20:30 CEST (UTC+02:00)	Nedvěd 5', 90+4'; Signori 90+1'	Report	Venturin 45+3' (o.g.); Ripa 61'; Masinga (red card) 69'	Stadium: Stadio Olimpico; Attendance: 41,528; Referee: Angelo Bonfrisco

5 October 1997 5	Internazionale	1–1	Lazio	Milan
20:30 CEST (UTC+02:00)	Ronaldo 41' (pen.)	Report	Nedvěd 35'	Stadium: San Siro; Attendance: 65,656; Referee: Fiorenzo Treossi

18 October 1997 6	Lazio	0–2	Atalanta	Rome
15:00 CEST (UTC+02:00)		Report	Sottil 34'; Dunđerski 50'; Foglio (red card) 59'	Stadium: Stadio Olimpico; Attendance: 40,006; Referee: Stefano Farina

1 November 1997 7	Roma	1–3	Lazio	Rome
20:30 CET (UTC+01:00)	Di Biagio (red card) 90'; Delvecchio 90+1'	Report	Favalli (red card) 7'; R. Mancini 47'; Casiraghi 57'; Nedvěd 84'	Stadium: Stadio Olimpico; Attendance: 73,121; Referee: Pierluigi Collina

9 November 1997 8	Lazio	3–0	Sampdoria	Rome
15:00 CET (UTC+01:00)	Marcolin 25' (pen.); Nedvěd 65'; Bokšić 87'	Report		Stadium: Stadio Olimpico; Attendance: 40,514; Referee: Emilio Pellegrino

22 November 1997 9	Piacenza	0–0	Lazio	Piacenza
15:00 CET (UTC+01:00)	Tramezzani (penalty missed) 17'	Report		Stadium: Stadio Galleana; Attendance: 10,265; Referee: Domenico Messina

30 November 1997 10	Lazio	2–3	Udinese	Rome
15:00 CET (UTC+01:00)	Fuser 31'; Negro 41'	Report	Poggi 32'; Cappioli 73'; Amoroso 84'	Stadium: Stadio Olimpico; Attendance: 38,249; Referee: Piero Ceccarini

6 December 1997 11	Juventus	2–1	Lazio	Turin
15:00 CET (UTC+01:00)	Del Piero 15', 34' (pen.)	Report	Marcolin 26' (pen.); Chamot (red card) 61'	Stadium: Stadio delle Alpi; Attendance: 42,692; Referee: Robert Boggi

14 December 1997 12	Lazio	1–0	Brescia	Rome
15:00 CET (UTC+01:00)	Bokšić 27'	Report		Stadium: Stadio Olimpico; Attendance: 35,064; Referee: Salvatore Racalbuto

21 December 1997 13	Lazio	4–0	Vicenza	Rome
15:00 CET (UTC+01:00)	Casiraghi 7'; Fuser 63'; Venturin 70'; Bokšić 90+1'	Report	Stovini (red card) 45+1'	Stadium: Stadio Olimpico; Attendance: 37,201; Referee: Cosimo Bolognino

4 January 1998 14	Parma	1–1	Lazio	Parma
15:00 CET (UTC+01:00)	Chiesa 55' (pen.)	Report	Bokšić 19'; Favalli (red card) 46'	Stadium: Stadio Ennio Tardini; Attendance: 21,783; Referee: Roberto Bettin

11 January 1998 15	Lazio	4–0	Lecce	Rome
15:00 CET (UTC+01:00)	Rambaudi 55'; Fuser 74'; Bokšić 83', 90+3'	Report		Stadium: Stadio Olimpico; Attendance: 38,424; Referee: Tarcisio Serena

18 January 1998 16	Fiorentina	1–3	Lazio	Florence
15:00 CET (UTC+01:00)	Cois 19'; Schwarz (red card) 48'	Report	Bokšić 31'; Rambaudi 78'; Nedvěd 84'	Stadium: Stadio Artemio Franchi; Attendance: 36,601; Referee: Graziano Cesari

25 January 1998 17	Lazio	1–0	Bologna	Rome
15:00 CET (UTC+01:00)	Nedvěd 43'	Report		Stadium: Stadio Olimpico; Attendance: 40,698; Referee: Pierluigi Pairetto

1 February 1998 18	Napoli	0–0	Lazio	Naples
20:30 CET (UTC+01:00)		Report		Stadium: Stadio San Paolo; Attendance: 41,543; Referee: Alfredo Trentalange

8 February 1998 19	Lazio	2–1	Milan	Rome
15:00 CET (UTC+01:00)	R. Mancini 6'; Bokšić 90+3'	Report	Leonardo (penalty missed) 29'; Kluivert 90+4'	Stadium: Stadio Olimpico; Attendance: 52,215; Referee: Livio Bazzoli

11 February 1998 20	Lazio	3–1	Empoli	Rome
20:30 CET (UTC+01:00)	Nedvěd 17'; Negro 55'; Gottardi 90+3'	Report	Cappellini 35'	Stadium: Stadio Olimpico; Attendance: 38,751; Referee: Gennaro Borriello

15 February 1998 21	Bari	0–2	Lazio	Bari
15:00 CET (UTC+01:00)		Report	Jugović 10' (pen.); Rambaudi 90+1'	Stadium: Stadio San Nicola; Attendance: 22,694; Referee: Stefano Braschi

22 February 1998 22	Lazio	3–0	Internazionale	Rome
15:00 CET (UTC+01:00)	Fuser 25'; Bokšić 29'; Casiraghi 81'	Report	Milanese (red card) 90+2'	Stadium: Stadio Olimpico; Attendance: 66,025; Referee: Pierluigi Collina

28 February 1998 23	Atalanta	0–0	Lazio	Bergamo
15:00 CET (UTC+01:00)		Report	Lopez (red card) 59'	Stadium: Stadio Atleti Azzurri d'Italia; Attendance: 19,379; Referee: Graziano Cesari

8 March 1998 24	Lazio	2–0	Roma	Rome
20:30 CET (UTC+01:00)	Bokšić 50'; Nedvěd 62'	Report		Stadium: Stadio Olimpico; Attendance: 69,450; Referee: Robert Boggi

14 March 1998 25	Sampdoria	0–4	Lazio	Genoa
15:00 CET (UTC+01:00)	Balleri (red card) 24'; Montella (penalty missed) 73'	Report	Jugović 1'; Nedvěd 54'; Fuser 66', 81'	Stadium: Stadio Luigi Ferraris; Attendance: 26,311; Referee: Domenico Messina

22 March 1998 26	Lazio	0–0	Piacenza	Rome
15:00 CET (UTC+01:00)		Report		Stadium: Stadio Olimpico; Attendance: 44,181; Referee: Daniele Tombolini

28 March 1998 27	Udinese	0–2	Lazio	Udine
15:00 CET (UTC+01:00)		Report	Jugović (penalty missed) 18'; R. Mancini 33'; Fuser 57'	Stadium: Stadio Friuli; Attendance: 14,635; Referee: Fiorenzo Treossi

5 April 1998 28	Lazio	0–1	Juventus	Rome
20:30 CEST (UTC+02:00)	Nedvěd (red card) 76'	Report	Inzaghi 60'	Stadium: Stadio Olimpico; Attendance: 70,136; Referee: Pierluigi Collina

11 April 1998 29	Brescia	1–1	Lazio	Brescia
15:00 CEST (UTC+02:00)	Diana 70'	Report	Rambaudi 10'	Stadium: Stadio Mario Rigamonti; Attendance: 10,831; Referee: Robert Boggi

19 April 1998 30	Vicenza	2–1	Lazio	Vicenza
15:00 CEST (UTC+02:00)	Zauli 27'; Luiso 54'	Report	R. Mancini 48'	Stadium: Stadio Romeo Menti; Attendance: 17,754; Referee: Stefano Braschi

26 April 1998 31	Lazio	1–2	Parma	Rome
15:00 CEST (UTC+02:00)	Nedvěd 57'	Report	Sensini 71'; Stanić 74'	Stadium: Stadio Olimpico; Referee: Pierluigi Pairetto

2 May 1998 32	Lecce	1–0	Lazio	Lecce
15:00 CEST (UTC+02:00)	Annoni (red card) 86'; Palmieri 88'; Cyprien (red card) 90+2'	Report	Marcolin (penalty missed) 90+3'	Stadium: Stadio Via del Mare; Attendance: 8,498; Referee: Daniele Tombolini

10 May 1998 33	Lazio	1–4	Fiorentina	Rome
15:00 CEST (UTC+02:00)	M. Serena 42' (o.g.); Casiraghi (red card) 68'	Report	Oliveira 14'; Edmundo 24'; Batistuta 41'; Rui Costa 84'	Stadium: Stadio Olimpico; Attendance: 39,929; Referee: Stefano Farina

16 May 1998 34	Bologna	2–1	Lazio	Bologna
15:00 CEST (UTC+02:00)	R. Baggio 40' (pen.), 70'	Report	Fuser 50'	Stadium: Stadio Renato Dall'Ara; Attendance: 31,241; Referee: Tarcisio Serena

=== Coppa Italia ===
==== Second round ====
3 September 1997 First leg	Fidelis Andria	0–3	Lazio	Andria
			Recchi 20' (o.g.); Signori 48', 77' (pen.)	Stadium: Stadio Degli Ulivi; Attendance: 10,500; Referee: Graziano Cesari

24 September 1997 Second leg	Lazio	3–2 (6–2 agg.)	Fidelis Andria	Rome
	Signori 18', 73'; Bokšić 23'		Biagioni 34'; Cappellacci 65'	Stadium: Stadio Olimpico; Attendance: 3,000; Referee: Gilberto Dagnello

==== Round of 16 ====
14 October 1997 First leg	Lazio	4–0	Napoli	Rome
	Bokšić 3', 30'; Signori 16' (pen.), 20'			Stadium: Stadio Olimpico; Attendance: 10,799; Referee: Graziano Cesari

19 November 1997 Second leg	Napoli	3–0 (3–4 agg.)	Lazio	Naples
	Protti 30'; Giannini 78'; Rossitto 87'			Stadium: Stadio San Paolo; Attendance: 6,257; Referee: Salvatore Racalbuto

==== Quarter-finals ====
6 January 1998 First leg	Lazio	4–1	Roma	Rome
	Bokšić 2'; Jugović 31' (pen.); R. Mancini 75'; Fuser 80'		Balbo 38' (pen.), (red card) 83'	Stadium: Stadio Olimpico; Attendance: 49,260; Referee: Pasquale Rodomonti

21 January 1998 Second leg	Roma	1–2 (2–6 agg.)	Lazio	Rome
	Paulo Sérgio 54'; Di Biagio (red card) 72'		Jugović 45' (pen.); Gottardi 90+4'	Stadium: Stadio Olimpico; Attendance: 46,583; Referee: Cosimo Bolognino

==== Semi-finals ====
19 February 1998 First leg	Juventus	0–1	Lazio	Turin
			Bokšić 22'	Stadium: Stadio delle Alpi; Attendance: 5,247; Referee: Fiorenzo Treossi

11 March 1998 Second leg	Lazio	2–2 (3–2 agg.)	Juventus	Rome
	Nedvěd 62', 65'		Fonseca 34'; Favalli 90+3' (o.g.)	Stadium: Stadio Olimpico; Attendance: 50,000; Referee: Emilio Pellegrino

==== Final ====
8 April 1998 First leg	Milan	1–0	Lazio	Milan
21:00 CEST (UTC+02:00)	Weah 89'			Stadium: San Siro; Attendance: 63,564; Referee: Livio Bazzoli

29 April 1998 Second leg	Lazio	3–1 (3–2 agg.)	Milan	Rome
21:00 CEST (UTC+02:00)	Gottardi 55'; Jugović 58' (pen.); Nesta 65'; Fuser (red card) 80'		Albertini 46'; Desailly (red card) 80'	Stadium: Stadio Olimpico; Attendance: 64,189; Referee: Fiorenzo Treossi

=== UEFA Cup ===
==== First round ====
16 September 1997 First leg	Vitória Guimarães (Portugal)	0–4	(Italy) Lazio	Guimarães, Portugal
22:00 CEST (UTC+02:00)		Report	Chamot (yellow card) 38'; Nesta (yellow card) 38', (goal) 80'; Marchegiani (yellow card) 44'; Casiraghi 48'; Fuser 64'; Nedvěd 70'	Stadium: Estádio D. Afonso Henriques; Attendance: 12,000; Referee: Roelof Luinge (Netherlands)

30 September 1997 Second leg	Lazio (Italy)	2–1 (6–1 agg.)	(Portugal) Vitória Guimarães	Rome, Italy
20:45 CEST (UTC+02:00)	Signori 40', (penalty missed) 57'; Nedvěd 74'	Report	Paas 1'; Alexandre (yellow card) 39'; Fangueiro (yellow card) 56' (yellow-red card) 83'	Stadium: Stadio Olimpico; Attendance: 5,000; Referee: Markus Merk (Germany)

==== Second round ====
21 October 1997 First leg	Rotor Volgograd (Russia)	0–0	(Italy) Lazio	Volgograd, Russia
18:00 CEST (UTC+02:00)	Berketov (yellow card) 78'	Report		Stadium: Central Stadium; Attendance: 24,000; Referee: Juan Antonio Fernández Martín (Spain)

4 November 1997 Second leg	Lazio (Italy)	3–0 (3–0 agg.)	(Russia) Rotor Volgograd	Rome, Italy
20:00 CET (UTC+01:00)	Casiraghi 5'; R. Mancini 34'; Signori 89'	Report	Zakharchuk (yellow card) 26'; Krivov (yellow card) 51'	Stadium: Stadio Olimpico; Attendance: 35,000; Referee: Ľuboš Micheľ (Slovakia)

==== Third round ====
25 November 1997 First leg	Rapid Wien (Austria)	0–2	(Italy) Lazio	Vienna, Austria
20:45 CET (UTC+01:00)	Freund (yellow card) 41' (yellow-red card) 56'; Schöttel (yellow card) 65'; Ipoua (yellow card) 68'	Report	R. Mancini (yellow card) 36' (yellow-red card) 63', (goal) 61'; Casiraghi 38'	Stadium: Ernst-Happel-Stadion; Attendance: 30,000; Referee: Vitor Melo Pereira (Portugal)

9 December 1997 Second leg	Lazio (Italy)	1–0 (3–0 agg.)	(Austria) Rapid Wien	Rome, Italy
20:15 CET (UTC+01:00)	Negro (yellow card) 62'; Venturin 85'	Report	Hiden (yellow card) 77'	Stadium: Stadio Olimpico; Attendance: 10,000; Referee: Ryszard Wójcik (Poland)

==== Quarter-finals ====
3 March 1998 First leg	Lazio (Italy)	1–0	(France) Auxerre	Rome, Italy
20:00 CET (UTC+01:00)	Jugović (yellow card) 56' (yellow-red card) 66'; Casiraghi 63'; Bokšić (yellow card) 71'	Report	Diomède (yellow card) 41'	Stadium: Stadio Olimpico; Attendance: 29,444; Referee: Michel Piraux (Belgium)

17 March 1998 Second leg	Auxerre (France)	2–2 (2–3 agg.)	(Italy) Lazio	Auxerre, France
20:15 CET (UTC+01:00)	Guivarc’h 39', 85'	Report	R. Mancini 7' (pen.); Gottardi 13'; Nesta (yellow card) 15'; Nedvěd (yellow card) 43'; Marcolin (yellow card) 74'	Stadium: Stade de l'Abbé-Deschamps; Attendance: 20,000; Referee: Antonio Jesús López Nieto (Spain)

==== Semi-finals ====
31 March 1998 First leg	Atlético Madrid (Spain)	0–1	(Italy) Lazio	Madrid, Spain
21:30 CEST (UTC+02:00)	Caminero (yellow card) 30'; Frascarelli (yellow card) 74'; Santi (yellow card) 81'	Report	Jugović (yellow card) 9', (goal) 33'; Grandoni (yellow card) 73'; Favalli (yellow card) 83'	Stadium: Vicente Calderón Stadium; Attendance: 55,000; Referee: Paul Durkin (England)

14 April 1998 Second leg	Lazio (Italy)	0–0 (1–0 agg.)	(Spain) Atlético Madrid	Rome, Italy
20:45 CEST (UTC+02:00)		Report	Aguilera (yellow card) 62'	Stadium: Stadio Olimpico; Attendance: 37,000; Referee: László Vágner (Hungary)

==== Final ====
6 May 1998	Lazio (Italy)	0–3	(Italy) Internazionale	Paris, France
20:45 CEST (UTC+02:00)	Jugović (yellow card) 59'; Almeyda (yellow card) 63' (yellow-red card) 88'; Negro (yellow card) 70'	Report	Zamorano 5'; Fresi (yellow card) 18'; J. Zanetti 60', (yellow card) 63'; Ronaldo 70', (yellow card) 74'; West (red card) 82'	Stadium: Parc des Princes; Attendance: 44,412; Referee: Antonio Jesús López Nieto (Spain)

== Statistics ==
=== Players statistics ===
No.	Pos	Nat	Player	Total		Serie A		Coppa Italia		UEFA Cup	
No.	Pos	Nat	Player	Apps	Goals	Apps	Goals	Apps	Goals	Apps	Goals
1	GK	(Italy) ITA	Marchegiani	51	-40	33	-29	8	-6	10	-5
15	DF	(Italy) ITA	Pancaro	34	1	23+1	1	3	0	7	0
2	DF	(Italy) ITA	Negro	47	2	26+2	2	10	0	9	0
13	DF	(Italy) ITA	Nesta	49	2	30	0	9	1	10	1
5	DF	(Italy) ITA	Favalli	41	0	23+1	0	8	0	9	0
14	MF	(Italy) ITA	Fuser	51	10	32	8	9	1	10	1
23	MF	(Italy) ITA	Venturin	44	2	17+9	1	9	0	9	1
18	MF	(Czech Republic) CZE	Nedved	43	15	21+5	11	6	2	11	2
21	MF	(Federal Republic of Yugoslavia) YUG	Jugovic	42	6	27	2	9	3	6	1
10	FW	(Italy) ITA	Mancini	52	9	31+3	5	8	1	10	3
9	FW	(Italy) ITA	Casiraghi	44	7	19+9	3	6	0	10	4
22	GK	(Italy) ITA	Ballotta	5	-7	1	-1	3	-5	1	-1
3	DF	(Italy) ITA	Lopez	34	0	18+5	0	5	0	6	0
19	FW	(Croatia) CRO	Boksic	38	15	17+9	10	6	5	6	0
25	MF	(Argentina) ARG	Almeyda	28	0	16+3	0	2	0	7	0
17	DF	(Switzerland) SUI	Gottardi	32	4	10+9	1	8	2	5	1
6	DF	(Argentina) ARG	Chamot	17	0	10+1	0	3	0	3	0
7	MF	(Italy) ITA	Rambaudi	26	4	6+15	4	4	0	1	0
4	MF	(Italy) ITA	Marcolin	31	2	6+12	2	7	0	6	0
20	DF	(Italy) ITA	Grandoni	22	0	5+5	0	8	0	4	0
11	FW	(Italy) ITA	Signori	13	10	3+3	2	4	6	3	2
26	DF	(Italy) ITA	Di Lello	0	0	0	0				
27	MF	(Italy) ITA	Laurentini	1	0	0+1	0				
28	DF	(Italy) ITA	Domizzi	0	0	0	0				
12	GK	(Italy) ITA	Orsi								
16	MF	(Australia) AUS	Okon								
8	MF	(Italy) ITA	Buso	2	0	0	0	2	0	0	0

- Source: http://calcio-seriea.net/allenatori_squadra/1997/1134/
