= 1998 Coppa Italia final =

50th Coppa Italia final
- Event: 1997–98 Coppa Italia
Milan	Lazio
2	3

First leg
Milan	Lazio
1	0
- Date: 8 April 1998
- Venue: San Siro, Milan
- Referee: Livio Bazzoli
- Attendance: 63,564

Second leg
Lazio	Milan
3	1
- Date: 29 April 1998
- Venue: Stadio Olimpico, Rome
- Referee: Florenzo Treossi
- Attendance: 64,189

The 1998 Coppa Italia final was the final of the 1997–98 Coppa Italia, the top cup competition in Italian football. The match was played over two legs on 8 and 29 April 1998 between Milan and Lazio. The final was won by Lazio, who claimed their second Coppa Italia title with a 3–2 aggregate victory.

== First leg ==
8 April 1998
21:00

Milan	1–0	Lazio
Weah 90'

San Siro, Milan
Attendance: 63,564
Referee: Livio Bazzoli

Milan	Lazio

GK	1	(Italy) Sebastiano Rossi
RB	35	(Norway) Steinar Nilsen
CB	24	(Croatia) Dario Smoje
CB	5	(Italy) Alessandro Costacurta
LB	3	(Italy) Paolo Maldini (c)
RM	32	(Italy) Roberto Donadoni	(substituted off) 90'
CM	8	(France) Marcel Desailly
CM	4	(Italy) Demetrio Albertini
LM	10	(Federal Republic of Yugoslavia) Dejan Savićević	(substituted off) 60'
CF	36	(Italy) Maurizio Ganz	(substituted off) 60'
CF	14	(Liberia) George Weah
Substitutes:
FW	38	(Italy) Filippo Maniero	(substituted in) 60'
MF	13	(France) Ibrahim Ba	(substituted in) 60'	(substituted off) 75'
MF	30	(Brazil) Leonardo	(substituted in) 75'
Manager:
(Italy) Fabio Capello

GK	1	(Italy) Luca Marchegiani
RB	2	(Italy) Paolo Negro
CB	13	(Italy) Alessandro Nesta	Booked
CB	6	(Argentina) José Chamot		(substituted off) 74'
LB	5	(Italy) Giuseppe Favalli	Booked
RM	14	(Italy) Diego Fuser (c)
CM	23	(Italy) Giorgio Venturin
CM	21	(Federal Republic of Yugoslavia) Vladimir Jugović
LM	18	(Czech Republic) Pavel Nedvěd
CF	9	(Italy) Pierluigi Casiraghi
CF	10	(Italy) Roberto Mancini		(substituted off) 85'
Substitutes:
DF	20	(Italy) Alessandro Grandoni		(substituted in) 74'
DF	17	(Switzerland) Guerino Gottardi		(substituted in) 85'
Manager:
(Sweden) Sven-Göran Eriksson

== Second leg ==
29 April 1998
21:00

Lazio	3–1	Milan
Gottardi 56'; Jugović 59' (pen.); Nesta 66'		Albertini 47'

Stadio Olimpico, Rome
Attendance: 64,189
Referee: Florenzo Treossi

Lazio	Milan

GK	1	(Italy) Luca Marchegiani
RB	2	(Italy) Paolo Negro
CB	13	(Italy) Alessandro Nesta
CB	20	(Italy) Alessandro Grandoni		(substituted off) 50'
LB	5	(Italy) Giuseppe Favalli
RM	14	(Italy) Diego Fuser (c)	(red card) 80'
CM	23	(Italy) Giorgio Venturin
CM	21	(Federal Republic of Yugoslavia) Vladimir Jugović
LM	18	(Czech Republic) Pavel Nedvěd		(substituted off) 90+2'
CF	9	(Italy) Pierluigi Casiraghi
CF	10	(Italy) Roberto Mancini		(substituted off) 88'
Substitutes:
DF	17	(Switzerland) Guerino Gottardi		(substituted in) 50'
DF	3	(Italy) Giovanni Lopez		(substituted in) 88'
MF	4	(Italy) Dario Marcolin		(substituted in) 90+2'
Manager:
(Sweden) Sven-Göran Eriksson

GK	1	(Italy) Sebastiano Rossi	Booked
RB	22	(Italy) Daniele Daino	Booked
CB	5	(Italy) Alessandro Costacurta
CB	3	(Italy) Paolo Maldini (c)
LB	17	(Germany) Christian Ziege
RW	13	(France) Ibrahim Ba		(substituted off) 67'
CM	8	(France) Marcel Desailly (red card) 80'
CM	4	(Italy) Demetrio Albertini
CM	32	(Italy) Roberto Donadoni
LW	10	(Federal Republic of Yugoslavia) Dejan Savićević		(substituted off) 31'
CF	14	(Liberia) George Weah	Booked
Substitutes:
FW	9	(Netherlands) Patrick Kluivert	Booked	(substituted in) 31'	(substituted off) 50'
MF	19	(Italy) Giampiero Maini		(substituted in) 50'
MF	36	(Italy) Maurizio Ganz	Booked	(substituted in) 67'
Manager:
(Italy) Fabio Capello

== See also ==
- 1997–98 AC Milan season
- 1997–98 SS Lazio season
