= 2002–03 SS Lazio season =

Lazio
2002–03 season
- President: Sergio Cragnotti (until 3 January 2003); Ugo Longo
- Manager: Roberto Mancini
- Stadium: Olimpico
- Serie A: 4th (in UEFA Champions League)
- Coppa Italia: Semi-finals
- UEFA Cup: Semi-finals
- Top goalscorer: League: Claudio López (15); All: Claudio López (17)
Home colours	Away colours	Third colours

The 2002–03 season was the 103rd season in Società Sportiva Lazio's history and their 15th consecutive season in the top-flight of Italian football. Under new manager Roberto Mancini, Lazio finished 4th in Serie A and reached the semi-finals of both the Coppa Italia and the UEFA Cup.

== Summary ==
Owing to financial worries, club president Sergio Cragnotti sold several players, including club legend defender Alessandro Nesta to AC Milan, forward Hernan Crespo to Inter and Gaizka Mendieta was loaned out to Barcelona. Among the new arrivals were young coach Roberto Mancini, along with low-profile players such as Bernardo Corradi from Chievo and Enrico Chiesa. On 3 January 2003, a majority of club shareholders appointed Ugo Longo as its new president, putting an end to Cragnotti's ten-year term.

== Squad ==
Note: Flags indicate national team as defined under FIFA eligibility rules; some limited exceptions apply. Players may hold more than one non-FIFA nationality.

No.	Pos.	Nation	Player
1	GK	ITA	Luca Marchegiani
2	DF	ITA	Francesco Colonnese
3	MF	BRA	César
4	MF	ITA	Dino Baggio
5	MF	SCG	Dejan Stanković
6	DF	ARG	Juan Pablo Sorín
7	FW	ARG	Claudio López
8	FW	ITA	Bernardo Corradi
9	MF	ITA	Stefano Fiore
11	DF	SCG	Siniša Mihajlović
14	MF	ARG	Diego Simeone
15	DF	ITA	Giuseppe Pancaro
16	MF	ITA	Giuliano Giannichedda

No.	Pos.	Nation	Player
17	DF	SUI	Guerino Gottardi
18	MF	SCG	Nikola Lazetić
19	DF	ITA	Giuseppe Favalli
20	MF	ITA	Fabio Liverani
21	FW	ITA	Simone Inzaghi
22	DF	ITA	Massimo Oddo
23	DF	ITA	Paolo Negro
24	DF	POR	Fernando Couto
25	FW	ITA	Enrico Chiesa
26	MF	ARG	Lucas Castromán
31	DF	NED	Jaap Stam
34	MF	CIV	Christian Manfredini
70	GK	ITA	Angelo Peruzzi
99	GK	ITA	Emanuele Concetti

=== Transfers ===
In
Pos.	Name	from	Type
FW	Bernardo Corradi	Internazionale	€10.00 million
DF	Massimo Oddo	Hellas Verona	€1.50 million
FW	Enrico Chiesa	Fiorentina	free
DF	Juan Pablo Sorín	Cruzeiro	loan
MF	Christian Manfredini	Chievo	co-ownership
MF	Roberto Baronio	Fiorentina	loan ended
DF	Daniel Ola	L'Aquila	loan ended
DF	Emanuele Pesaresi	Benfica	loan ended

Out
Pos.	Name	To	Type
FW	Hernán Crespo	Internazionale	(€40 million)
DF	Alessandro Nesta	A.C. Milan	(€31 million)
DF	Alberto Comazzi	Hellas Verona	
DF	Daniel Ola	Teramo	
MF	Iván de la Peña	Espanyol	
MF	Karel Poborský	Sparta Prague	
DF	Emanuele Pesaresi	Chievo	co-ownership
MF	Roberto Baronio	Perugia	loan
MF	Gaizka Mendieta	Barcelona	loan
FW	Felice Evacuo	Fiorentina	loan

==== Winter ====
In
Pos.	Name	from	Type
MF	Nikola Lazetic	Chievo	

Out
Pos.	Name	To	Type
DF	Juan Pablo Sorín	Barcelona	loan
MF	Christian Manfredini	Osasuna	loan

== Competitions ==
=== Serie A ===
==== League table ====
Pos	Team	Pld	W	D	L	GF	GA	GD	Pts	Qualification or relegation
2	Internazionale	34	19	8	7	64	38	+26	65	Qualification to Champions League group stage
3	Milan (Note: Milan qualified for the Champions League group stage as defending champions.)	34	18	7	9	55	30	+25	61	Qualification to Champions League group stage
4	Lazio	34	15	15	4	57	32	+25	60	Qualification to Champions League third qualifying round
5	Parma	34	15	11	8	55	36	+19	56 (Note: Parma finished ahead of Udinese on head-to-head points: Udinese 1–1 Parma, Parma 3–2 Udinese.)	Qualification to UEFA Cup first round
6	Udinese	34	16	8	10	38	35	+3	56	Qualification to UEFA Cup first round

Source: 2002–03 Serie A, Soccerway
Rules for classification: 1) Points; 2) Head-to-head points; 3) Head-to-head goal difference; 4) Goal difference; 5) Goals scored; 6) Draw. (Note: Head-to-head record is used only after all the matches between the teams in question have been played).

==== Results summary ====
Overall								Home						Away					
Pld	W	D	L	GF	GA	GD	Pts	W	D	L	GF	GA	GD	W	D	L	GF	GA	GD
34	15	15	4	57	32	+25	60	7	8	2	31	16	+15	8	7	2	26	16	+10

==== Results by round ====
Round	1	2	3	4	5	6	7	8	9	10	11	12	13	14	15	16	17	18	19	20	21	22	23	24	25	26	27	28	29	30	31	32	33	34
Ground	H	A	H	A	H	H	A	A	H	A	H	A	H	A	H	A	H	H	A	H	A	H	A	A	H	A	H	A	H	A	H	A	H	A
Result	L	W	D	W	W	D	W	W	D	W	W	W	D	W	D	D	W	L	D	D	D	D	D	D	W	L	W	D	W	D	D	W	W	L
Position	11	7	9	5	4	4	4	4	4	4	3	1	2	2	3	3	2	4	4	4	4	4	4	4	4	4	4	4	4	4	4	4	4	4

Source: Competitive matches
A = Away; H = Home; W = Win; D = Draw; L = Loss; = Leader, 2003–04 UEFA Champions League group stage; = 2003–04 UEFA Champions League group stage; = 2003–04 UEFA Champions League qualifying round; = 2003–04 UEFA Cup; = 2003–04 Serie B

==== Matches ====
15 September 2002 2	Lazio	2–3	Chievo	Rome
15:00 CEST (UTC+02:00)	Simeone 5'; Corradi 64'	Report	D'Anna 14'; Bierhoff 49'; Della Morte 70'	Stadium: Stadio Olimpico; Attendance: 37,299; Referee: Domenico Messina

22 September 2002 3	Torino	0–1	Lazio	Turin
15:00 CEST (UTC+02:00)			Simeone 86'	Stadium: Stadio delle Alpi; Attendance: 13,464; Referee: Cosimo Bolognino

28 September 2002 4	Lazio	1–1	Milan	Rome
20:30 CEST (UTC+02:00)	C. López 51'		Maldini 7'	Stadium: Stadio Olimpico; Attendance: 59,226; Referee: Roberto Rosetti

6 October 2002 5	Atalanta	0–1	Lazio	Bergamo
20:30 CEST (UTC+02:00)			César 24'	Stadium: Stadio Atleti Azzurri d'Italia; Attendance: 14,158; Referee: Fiorenzo Treossi

20 October 2002 6	Lazio	3–0	Perugia	Rome
15:00 CEST (UTC+02:00)	S. Inzaghi 11'; Chiesa 84', 90+1'			Stadium: Stadio Olimpico; Attendance: 35,278; Referee: Stefano Farina

27 October 2002 7	Lazio	2–2	Roma	Rome
20:30 CET (UTC+01:00)	Fiore 51'; Stanković 75'		Delvecchio 56'; Batistuta 66'	Stadium: Stadio Olimpico; Attendance: 69,877; Referee: Gianluca Paparesta

3 November 2002 8	Empoli	1–2	Lazio	Empoli
15:00 CET (UTC+01:00)	Atzori 45+1'		Corradi 45'; Stanković 81'	Stadium: Stadio Carlo Castellani; Attendance: 7,861; Referee: Stefano Cassarà

6 November 2002 1	Reggina	0–3	Lazio	Reggio Calabria
20:30 CET (UTC+01:00)		Report	Fiore 16'; Stanković 33'; Corradi 53'	Stadium: Stadio Oreste Granillo; Attendance: 23,144; Referee: Nicola Ayroldi
Note: Match programmed for 1 September 2002 and rescheduled due to contract financial disagreements between several teams and the TV satellite company owner of broadcasting rights.

10 November 2022 9	Lazio	0–0	Parma	Rome
15:00 CET (UTC+01:00)		Report		Stadium: Stadio Olimpico; Attendance: 37,155; Referee: Domenico Messina

17 November 2002 10	Como	1–3	Lazio	Como
15:00 CET (UTC+01:00)	Corrent 37'	Report	Simeone 18'; C. López 56', 63'	Stadium: Stadio Giuseppe Sinigaglia; Attendance: 7,008; Referee: Daniele Tombolini

24 November 2002 11	Lazio	4–0	Modena	Rome
20:30 CET (UTC+01:00)	Corradi 25', 89'; C. López 31'; César 71'	Report		Stadium: Stadio Olimpico; Attendance: 42,100; Referee: Alfredo Trentalange

1 December 2002 12	Piacenza	2–3	Lazio	Piacenza
15:00 CET (UTC+01:00)	Maresca 17'; Caccia 26'	Report	Simeone 42'; C. López 45+1'; Corradi 90+1'	Stadium: Stadio Leonardo Garilli; Attendance: 32,280; Referee: Stefano Farina

7 December 2002 13	Lazio	3–3	Internazionale	Rome
20:30 CET (UTC+01:00)	C. López 10' (pen.), 36', 53'	Report	Couto 37' (o.g.); Emre 66', 75'	Stadium: Stadio Olimpico; Attendance: 60,789; Referee: Roberto Rosetti

15 December 2002 14	Juventus	1–2	Lazio	Turin
20:30 CET (UTC+01:00)	Nedvěd 34'	Report	Fiore 35', 51'	Stadium: Stadio delle Alpi; Attendance: 38,014; Referee: Emilio Pellegrino

22 December 2002 15	Lazio	1–1	Bologna	Rome
15:00 CET (UTC+01:00)	C. López 45+1'	Report	Zaccardo 65'	Stadium: Stadio Olimpico; Attendance: 42,685; Referee: Roberto Rosetti

11 January 2003 16	Brescia	0–0	Lazio	Brescia
20:30 CET (UTC+01:00)		Report		Stadium: Stadio Mario Rigamonti; Attendance: 15,975; Referee: Stefano Farina

19 January 2003 17	Lazio	2–1	Udinese	Rome
15:00 CET (UTC+01:00)	C. López 27'; Fiore 45+1'		Muzzi 40'	Stadium: Stadio Olimpico; Attendance: 34,990; Referee: Emilio Pellegrino

26 January 2003 18	Lazio	0–1	Reggina	Rome
15:00 CET (UTC+01:00)		Report	Bonazzoli 46'	Stadium: Stadio Olimpico; Attendance: 36,777; Referee: Emidio Morganti

2 February 2003 19	Chievo	1–1	Lazio	Verona
15:00 CET (UTC+01:00)	Corini 45' (pen.)	Report	Simeone 89'	Stadium: Stadio Marc'Antonio Bentegodi; Attendance: 14,921; Referee: Stefano Farina

9 February 2003 20	Lazio	1–1	Torino	Rome
15:00 CET (UTC+01:00)	Simeone 35'	Report	Ferrante 71'	Stadium: Stadio Olimpico; Attendance: 33,535; Referee: Domenico Messina

16 February 2003 21	Milan	2–2	Lazio	Milan
20:30 CET (UTC+01:00)	F. Inzaghi 62'; Rivaldo 70'	Report	Stanković 21'; C. López 30' (pen.)	Stadium: San Siro; Attendance: 61,605; Referee: Pierluigi Collina

23 February 2003 22	Lazio	0–0	Atalanta	Rome
15:00 CET (UTC+01:00)		Report		Stadium: Stadio Olimpico; Attendance: 33,611; Referee: Daniele Tombolini

2 March 2003 23	Perugia	2–2	Lazio	Perugia
15:00 CET (UTC+01:00)	Zé Maria 13'; Grosso 43'	Report	Corradi 16'; Negro 85'	Stadium: Stadio Renato Curi; Attendance: 9,522; Referee: Matteo Trefoloni

8 March 2003 24	Roma	1–1	Lazio	Rome
20:30 CET (UTC+01:00)	Cassano 89'	Report	Stanković 9'	Stadium: Stadio Olimpico; Attendance: 72,668; Referee: Domenico Messina

16 March 2003 25	Lazio	4–1	Empoli	Rome
15:00 CET (UTC+01:00)	C. López 8'; Corradi 41'; Simeone 71'; Castromán 85'	Report	Buscè 5'	Stadium: Stadio Olimpico; Attendance: 32,727; Referee: Gianluca Paparesta

23 March 2003 26	Parma	2–1	Lazio	Parma
15:00 CET (UTC+01:00)	Cardone 4'; Adriano 90+2'	Report	Stanković 50'	Stadium: Stadio Ennio Tardini; Attendance: 15,732; Referee: Domenico Messina

6 April 2003 27	Lazio	3–0	Como	Rome
15:00 CEST (UTC+02:00)	Fiore 6'; Corradi 17'; C. López 66' (pen.)	Report		Stadium: Stadio Olimpico; Attendance: 33,618; Referee: Daniele Tombolini

13 April 2003 28	Modena	0–0	Lazio	Modena
15:00 CEST (UTC+02:00)		Report		Stadium: Stadio Alberto Braglia; Attendance: 13,821; Referee: Domenico Messina

19 April 2003 29	Lazio	2–1	Piacenza	Rome
15:00 CEST (UTC+02:00)	S. Inzaghi 60'; Corradi 74'	Report	De Cesare 45'	Stadium: Stadio Olimpico; Attendance: 32,280; Referee: Paolo Dondarini

27 April 2003 30	Internazionale	1–1	Lazio	Milan
20:30 CEST (UTC+02:00)	Crespo 43'	Report	S. Inzaghi 77'	Stadium: San Siro; Attendance: 58,430; Referee: Pierluigi Collina

3 May 2003 31	Lazio	0–0	Juventus	Rome
15:00 CEST (UTC+02:00)		Report		Stadium: Stadio Olimpico; Attendance: 60,146; Referee: Pierluigi Collina

10 May 2003 32	Bologna	0–2	Lazio	Bologna
15:00 CEST (UTC+02:00)		Report	S. Inzaghi 45' (pen.); Favalli 59'	Stadium: Stadio Renato Dall'Ara; Attendance: 21,069; Referee: Gianluca Paparesta

17 May 2003 33	Lazio	3–1	Brescia	Rome
15:00 CEST (UTC+02:00)	Mihajlović 39' (pen.); César 45'; C. López 81'	Report	R. Baggio 20'	Stadium: Stadio Olimpico; Attendance: 68,095; Referee: Massimiliano Saccani

24 May 2003 34	Udinese	2–1	Lazio	Udine
15:00 CEST (UTC+02:00)	Pizarro 67' (pen.); Jankulovski 83'	Report	C. López 87' (pen.)	Stadium: Stadio Friuli; Attendance: 17,972; Referee: Matteo Trefoloni

=== Coppa Italia ===
==== Round of 16 ====
4 December 2002 1	Lazio	2–0	Empoli	Rome
15:00 CET	Pancaro 10'; S. Inzaghi 52' (pen.)			Stadium: Stadio Olimpico; Attendance: 5,000; Referee: Paolo Dondarini

19 December 2002 2	Empoli	1–2 (1–4 agg.)	Lazio	Empoli
17:30 CET	Grieco 70'		Chiesa 45'; Pancaro 64'	Stadium: Stadio Carlo Castellani; Attendance: 2,000; Referee: Alberto Castellani

==== Quarter-finals ====
15 January 2003 1	Lazio	2–1	Bari	Rome
18:00 CET	Castromán 41'; D'Agostino 90' (aut)		D'Agostino 66'	Stadium: Stadio Olimpico; Attendance: 8,000; Referee: Emidio Morganti

21 January 2003 2	Bari	0–0 (1–2 agg.)	Lazio	Bari
21:00 CET				Stadium: Stadio San Nicola; Attendance: 2,347; Referee: Stefano Farina

==== Semi-finals ====
5 February 2003 1	Lazio	1–2	Roma	Rome
20:45 CET	Fiore 76'		Cassano 12'; Emerson 49'	Stadium: Stadio Olimpico; Attendance: 53,577; Referee: Matteo Trefoloni

16 April 2003 2	Roma	1–0 (3–1 agg.)	Lazio	Rome
20:45 CEST	Montella 56'			Stadium: Stadio Olimpico; Attendance: 52,087; Referee: Pierluigi Collina

=== UEFA Cup ===
==== First round ====
19 September 2002 First leg	Lazio (Italy)	4–0	(Greece) Skoda Xanthi	Rome, Italy
20:45	Manfredini 45'; López 52'; Inzaghi 68'; César 69'	Report		Stadium: Stadio Olimpico; Attendance: 13,343; Referee: Željko Širić (Croatia)

3 October 2002 Second leg	Skoda Xanthi (Greece)	0–0 (0–4 agg.)	(Italy) Lazio	Xanthi, Greece
19:30		Report		Stadium: Skoda Xanthi Stadium; Attendance: 2,790; Referee: Vladimír Hriňák (Slovakia)

==== Second round ====
31 October 2002 First leg	Lazio (Italy)	1–0	(Federal Republic of Yugoslavia) Red Star Belgrade	Rome, Italy
20:30	Fiore 10'	Report		Stadium: Stadio Olimpico; Attendance: 16,511; Referee: Metin Tokat (Turkey)

14 November 2002 Second leg	Red Star Belgrade (Federal Republic of Yugoslavia)	1–1 (1–2 agg.)	(Italy) Lazio	Belgrade, FR Yugoslavia
19:00	Bošković 69'	Report	Chiesa 77'	Stadium: Red Star Stadium; Attendance: 52,000; Referee: Julián Rodríguez Santiago (Spain)

==== Third round ====
28 November 2002 First leg	Sturm Graz (Austria)	1–3	(Italy) Lazio	Graz, Austria
20:30	Amoah 44'	Report	Chiesa 46'; Inzaghi 56', 87'	Stadium: Stadion Graz-Liebenau; Attendance: 15,375; Referee: Jacek Granat (Poland)

12 December 2002 Second leg	Lazio (Italy)	0–1 (3–2 agg.)	(Austria) Sturm Graz	Rome, Italy
20:30		Report	Szabics 87'	Stadium: Stadio Olimpico; Attendance: 3,958; Referee: Paul Allaerts (Belgium)

==== Fourth round ====
20 February 2003 First leg	Lazio (Italy)	3–3	(Poland) Wisła Kraków	Rome, Italy
21:00	Lazetić 22'; Jop 44' (o.g.); Chiesa 71'	Report	Uche 39'; Żurawski 50' (pen.), 63' (pen.)	Stadium: Stadio Olimpico; Attendance: 16,004; Referee: Konrad Plautz (Austria)

5 March 2003 Second leg	Wisła Kraków (Poland)	1–2 (4–5 agg.)	(Italy) Lazio	Kraków, Poland
18:00	Kuźba 5'	Report	Couto 20'; Chiesa 53'	Stadium: Stadion Miejski; Attendance: 9,100; Referee: Stuart Dougal (Scotland)

==== Quarter-finals ====
13 March 2003 First leg	Lazio (Italy)	1–0	(Turkey) Beşiktaş	Rome, Italy
21:00	Inzaghi 55'	Report		Stadium: Stadio Olimpico; Attendance: 17,133; Referee: Manuel Mejuto González (Spain)

20 March 2003 Second leg	Beşiktaş (Turkey)	1–2 (1–3 agg.)	(Italy) Lazio	Istanbul, Turkey
20:00	Sergen 82'	Report	Fiore 5'; Castromán 9'	Stadium: BJK İnönü Stadium; Attendance: 21,800; Referee: Graham Poll (England)

==== Semi-finals ====
10 April 2003 First leg	Porto (Portugal)	4–1	(Italy) Lazio	Porto, Portugal
22:00	Maniche 10'; Derlei 28', 50'; Postiga 56'	Report	López 6'	Stadium: Estádio das Antas; Attendance: 45,518; Referee: Kyros Vassaras (Greece)

24 April 2003 Second leg	Lazio (Italy)	0–0 (1–4 agg.)	(Portugal) Porto	Rome, Italy
21:00		Report		Stadium: Stadio Olimpico; Attendance: 69,873; Referee: Gilles Veissiere (France)

== Statistics ==
=== Players statistics ===
No.	Pos	Nat	Player	Total		Serie A		Coppa		UEFA Cup	
No.	Pos	Nat	Player	Apps	Goals	Apps	Goals	Apps	Goals	Apps	Goals
70	GK	(Italy) ITA	Peruzzi	36	-34	30	-28	0	0	6	-6
3	DF	(Brazil) BRA	César	36	4	25+1	3	1	0	9	1
31	DF	(Netherlands) NED	Stam	34	0	28	0	2	0	4	0
11	DF	(Serbia and Montenegro) SCG	Mihajlović	28	1	21	1	1	0	6	0
19	DF	(Italy) ITA	Favalli	35	1	25+1	1	3	0	6	0
9	MF	(Italy) ITA	Fiore	46	9	28+5	6	5	1	8	2
16	MF	(Italy) ITA	Giannichedda	34	0	18+7	0	3	0	6	0
14	MF	(Argentina) ARG	Simeone	35	7	18+6	7	4	0	7	0
5	MF	(Serbia and Montenegro) SCG	Stanković	38	6	29	6	2	0	7	0
8	FW	(Italy) ITA	Corradi	36	10	29+3	10	4	0	-	-
7	FW	(Argentina) ARG	López	47	17	30+4	15	4	0	9	2
1	GK	(Italy) ITA	Marchegiani	14	-10	4+2	-3	3	-3	5	-4
23	DF	(Italy) ITA	Negro	28	1	18+1	1	3	0	6	0
22	DF	(Italy) ITA	Oddo	31	0	16+3	0	5	0	7	0
24	DF	(Portugal) POR	Couto	31	1	15	0	4	0	12	1
15	DF	(Italy) ITA	Pancaro	25	2	10+6	0	4	2	5	0
20	MF	(Italy) ITA	Liverani	34	0	9+12	0	5	0	8	0
21	FW	(Italy) ITA	Inzaghi	29	9	5+13	4	3	1	8	4
26	MF	(Argentina) ARG	Castromán	29	3	4+12	1	5	1	8	1
25	FW	(Italy) ITA	Chiesa	29	7	4+8	2	6	1	11	4
6	DF	(Argentina) ARG	Sorín	11	0	4+2	0	1	0	4	0
18	MF	(Serbia and Montenegro) SCG	Lazetić	10	1	3+2	0	1	0	4	1
34	FW	(Ivory Coast) CIV	Manfredini	12	1	1+2	0	3	0	6	1
4	MF	(Italy) ITA	Baggio	15	0	0+4	0	3	0	8	0
99	GK	(Italy) ITA	Concetti	7	-5	0+2	-1	3	-2	2	-2
17	DF	(Switzerland) SUI	Gottardi	6	0	0+1	0	3	0	2	0
2	DF	(Italy) ITA	Colonnese	6	0	0	0	3	0	3	0

- Source: http://calcio-seriea.net/rose/2002/1223/

== Sources ==
- RSSSF - Italy 2002/03
