= Fabio Capello =

Italian footballer and manager (born 1946)

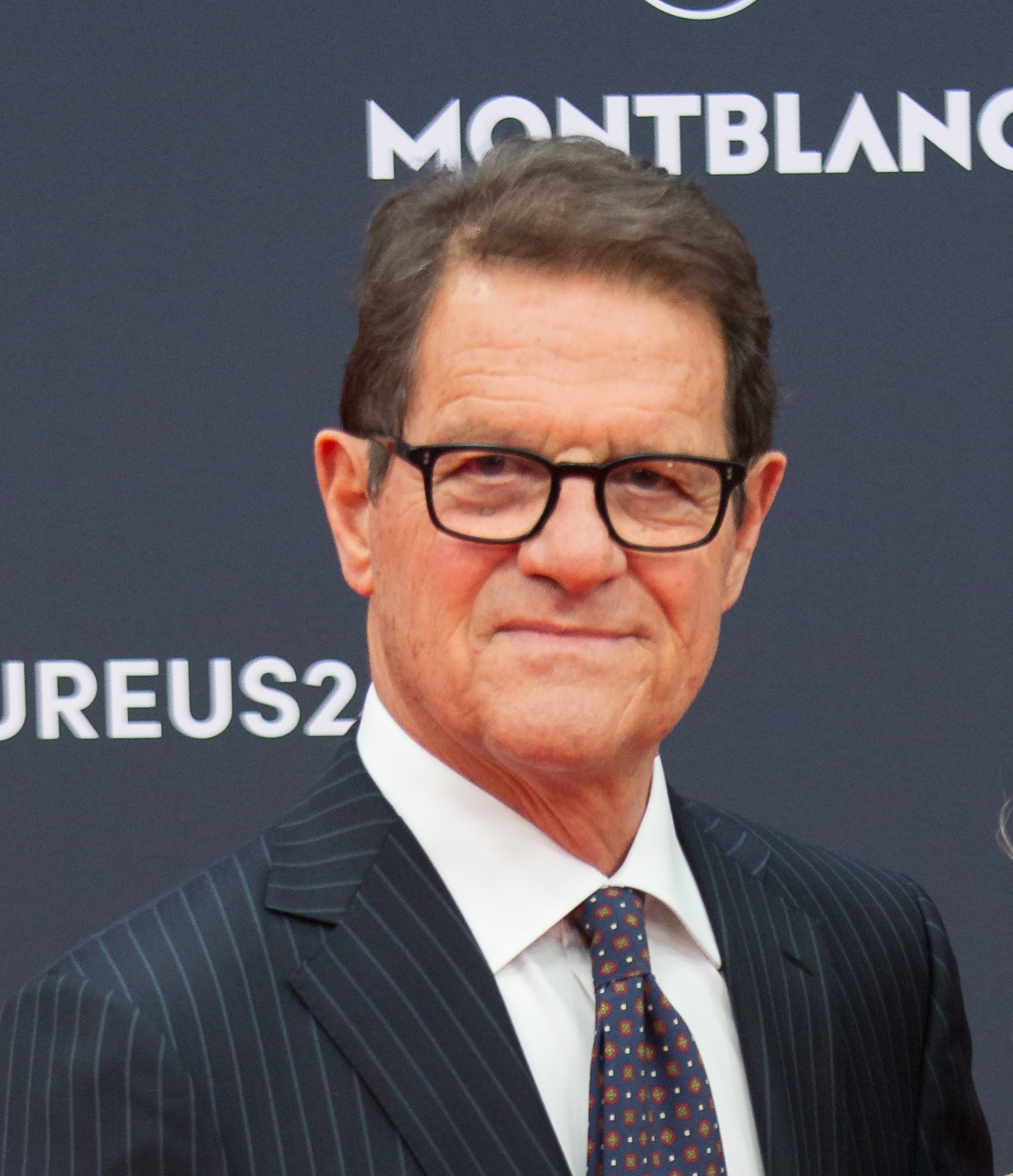
- Capello in 2024

Personal information
- Full name: Fabio Capello
- Date of birth: 18 June 1946 (age 80)
- Place of birth: San Canzian d'Isonzo, Italy
- Height: 1.77 m (5 ft 10 in)
- Position: Midfielder

Youth career
- 1962–1964: SPAL

Senior career*
Years	Team	Apps	(Gls)
1964–1967	SPAL	49	(3)
1967–1970	Roma	62	(11)
1970–1976	Juventus	165	(27)
1976–1980	AC Milan	65	(4)
Total		341	(45)

International career
1972–1978	Italy	32	(8)

Managerial career
- 1982–1986: AC Milan Primavera
- 1987: AC Milan (caretaker)
- 1991–1996: AC Milan
- 1996–1997: Real Madrid
- 1997–1998: AC Milan
- 1999–2004: Roma
- 2004–2006: Juventus
- 2006–2007: Real Madrid
- 2007–2012: England
- 2012–2015: Russia
- 2017–2018: Jiangsu Suning
- * Club domestic league appearances and goals

Fabio Capello ([ˈfaːbjo kaˈpɛllo, -ˈpel-]; born 18 June 1946) is an Italian former professional football manager and player. He is regarded as one of the greatest managers of all time.

As a player, Capello represented SPAL, Roma, AC Milan and Juventus. He played as a midfielder and won several trophies during his career which lasted over 15 years. He won the Coppa Italia with Roma in 1969, though he was most successful with Juventus, winning three Serie A titles in 1972, 1973 and 1975. With Milan, he won the Coppa Italia again in 1977 and also won another Serie A in 1979. Capello also played internationally for Italy during his career, amassing 32 caps and scoring 8 goals.

In his first five seasons as a manager, Capello won four Serie A titles with Milan, where he also won the 1993–94 UEFA Champions League, defeating Barcelona 4–0 in a memorable final. He then spent a year at Real Madrid, where he won the La Liga title at his first attempt, and in 2001 led Roma to their first league title in 18 years. Capello also won two titles at Juventus (which were later stripped after the Calciopoli scandal), and in 2006 returned to Real Madrid, where he won another La Liga title. Overall, he has won a major league championship in seven (or nine, counting the two revoked titles with Juventus) of his 16 seasons as a coach.

Capello was appointed as manager of the England national team in December 2007. During his time as manager, he was successful in tournament qualification, guiding the team to the 2010 FIFA World Cup, where they were knocked out in the second round, and UEFA Euro 2012, where they were knocked out in the quarter-finals under new manager Roy Hodgson. In February 2012, he resigned as manager due to a dispute with The Football Association, before being appointed coach of the Russian national team in July 2012. On 14 July 2015, he was sacked by the Russian Football Union and replaced with Leonid Slutsky. In 2017, he was appointed as the coach of Chinese club Jiangsu Suning, but was sacked the following year, after which he retired from coaching.

== Club career ==
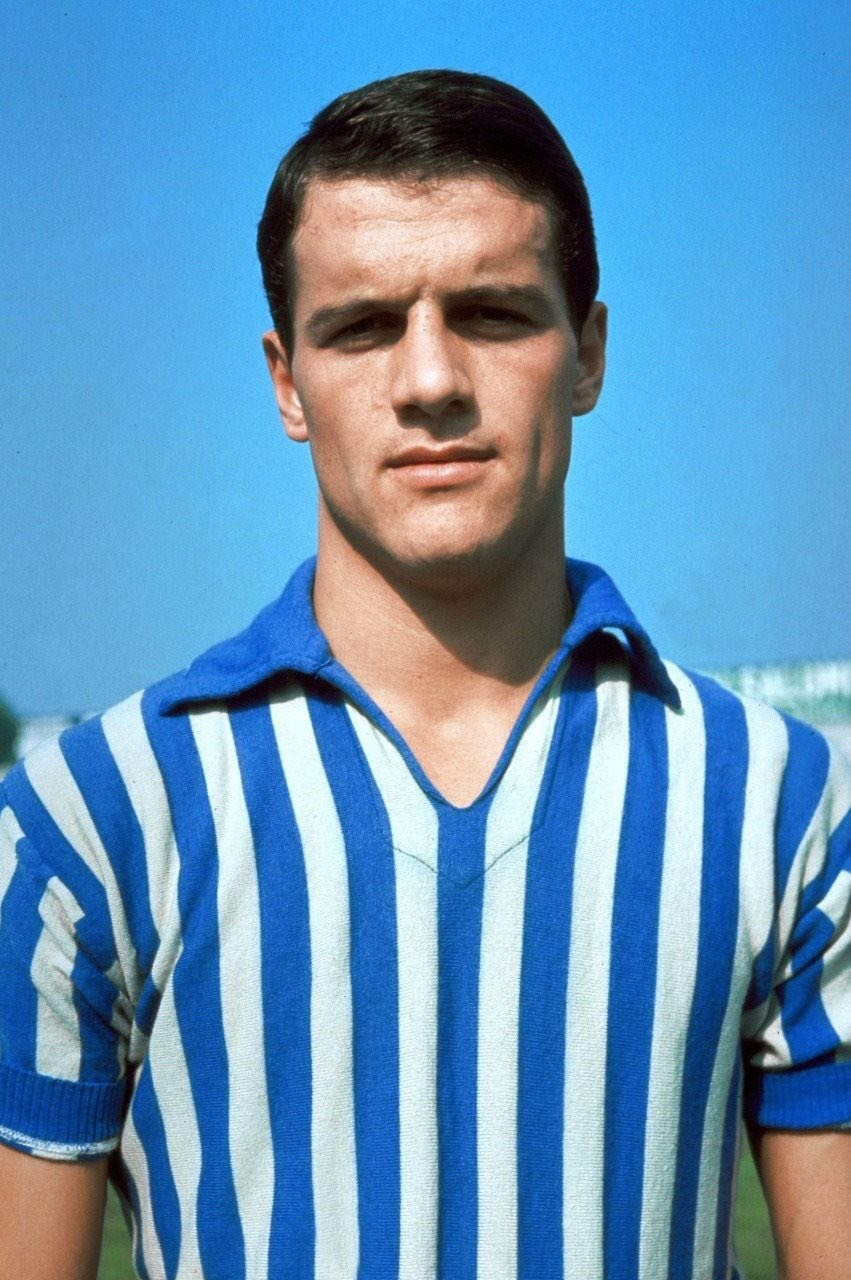
Capello with SPAL in 1966

Capello was signed by Paolo Mazza, the President of SPAL, for the fee of two million lire despite interest from Milan. In his second season in the youth team, he helped the club win the Italian Youth Championship and made his first-team debut in a 3–1 away defeat against Sampdoria in Serie A on 29 March 1964. A talented and tactically intelligent holding midfielder, with a good positional sense, he could read the play well and was strong both in the air and in the tackle, in spite of his lack of notable height and unorthodox physique. He usually operated as a deep-lying playmaker in midfield, however, due to his outstanding technique and vision, which enabled him to orchestrate his team's attacking moves or create chances for teammates, and furthermore was an excellent passer of the ball with both feet. Going forward he was also equally effective, and possessed an eye for goal from midfield, due to his powerful and accurate shot, as well as his ability at penalty kicks, but he lacked pace, and was notorious for not being particularly hard-working. With SPAL, he made four appearances for a struggling side that was relegated from Serie A. After returning to the top division at the first attempt, Capello became a key player in the 1965–66 season, taking penalties and helping them avoid a swift return to Serie B. He was also called up to the Italian under-23 side alongside teammate Edoardo Reja despite still being a teenager. However, injury to his left knee restricted him to just 16 appearances the following season.

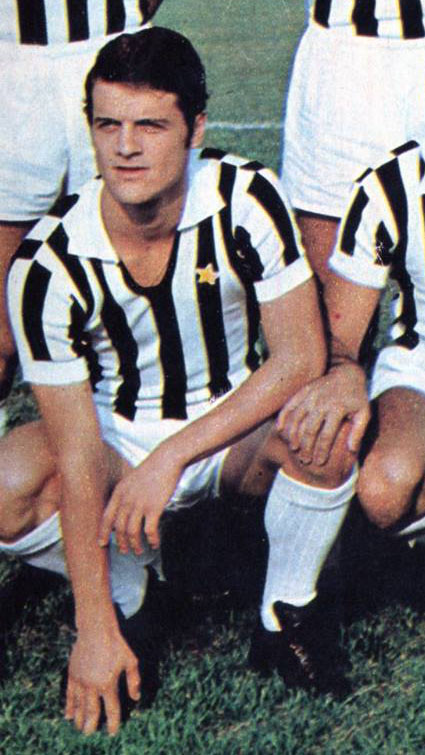
Capello with Juventus in 1970

In 1967, Capello moved to Roma where he became a key player for the club. In his first season, he helped them to first place after eight matches, including scoring the winner in a 1–0 victory over Juventus. A recurrence of the injury to his left knee, however, kept him out for the rest of the season and Roma eventually finished in tenth place, just five points away from relegation. The following season, under new manager Helenio Herrera, a fit Capello scored six goals as Roma finished eighth and won his first major trophy, the Coppa Italia. This qualified Roma to play the Anglo-Italian League Cup, where they played Swindon Town. Capello played in both legs against Swindon, Roma winning 2–1 at home in the first leg but losing 4–0 in the second leg at the County Ground. They also reached the semi-finals of the European Cup Winners' Cup, but were knocked out by Polish side Górnik Zabrze after losing the deciding coin toss following three draws.

He was then sold to Juventus in 1970. He had a poor start to his time there, as he publicly criticised manager Armando Picchi on the same day it was revealed that Picchi had been diagnosed with cancer. Capello escaped with a fine from the club after Picchi insisted that he not receive a suspension. Capello became an influential figure under new manager Čestmír Vycpálek, despite being only 24, and was assigned the number 10 shirt; he largely decided the team's tactics for the 1971 Inter-Cities Fairs Cup final against Leeds United. Capello scored at the Stadio Olimpico di Torino, but Juventus lost the tie on away goals. Juventus went on to win the league title in the 1971–72, 1972–73 and 1974–75 seasons. They also reached the 1973 European Cup final, where they were beaten 1–0 by the dominant "Total Football" approach of Ajax. They missed out on the chance of winning the double after losing to Milan on penalties in the 1973 Coppa Italia final. Reaching the semi-finals of the 1974–75 UEFA Cup, Juventus were surprisingly beaten by Dutch side Twente.

Juventus were concerned with Capello's knee injuries, and so traded him to Milan in exchange for Romeo Benetti and 100 million lire in 1976. He missed just two league starts in the 1976–77 season playing under influential manager Nils Liedholm. However, he was limited to just eight appearances in the 1978–79 title-winning season. He played just three games in the 1979–80 season, before finally accepting that he was unable to continue as a professional footballer.

== International career ==
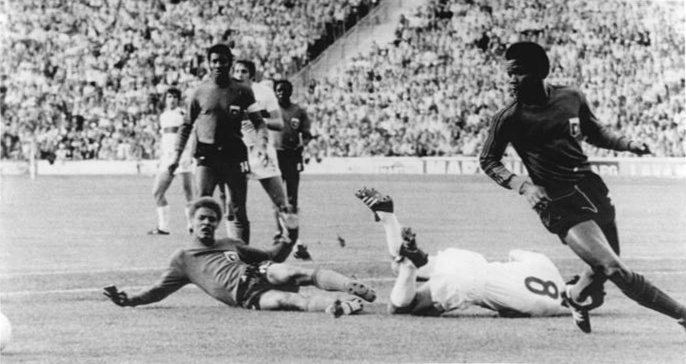
Capello (number 8) at the 1974 World Cup

Capello played 32 times for Italy between 1972 and 1978, scoring 8 goals; he made his international debut on 13 May 1972, in a 2–1 defeat to Belgium. He is particularly remembered for a goal with which Italy beat England 1–0 at Wembley Stadium for the first time in its history (14 November 1973), which he himself regarded as the highlight of his playing career. Capello scored the lone goal for Italy against Poland during the 1974 World Cup, though Italy lost the match 2–1 and failed to qualify for the second round of the competition. He was overlooked for the 1978 World Cup even after having good club form with Milan: the manager at that time, Enzo Bearzot, preferred other defensive-minded midfielders such as Marco Tardelli over the more attacking minded Capello.

== Style of play ==
Regarded as one of the most influential Italian players of his generation, Capello was a tactically intelligent holding midfielder, with a positional sense and intuition.He usually played in the centre of the pitch, however, where he operated as a deep-lying playmaker in midfield, due to his technique and vision, which enabled him to orchestrate his team's attacking moves or create chances for teammates, and was a passer of the ball with both feet. In spite of his playing role, he was an offensive-minded midfielder. Indeed, going forward he was also equally effective as he was creatively and defensively, and possessed an eye for goal from midfield, due to his powerful and accurate shot, as well as his ability at penalty kicks. His offensive movement and ability to make late runs into the area from behind also made him an offensive threat, but at the same time he lacked pace, and was notorious for not being particularly hard-working.

== After retirement ==
After several years as a football pundit for Italian TV SPW and a brief spell as caretaker manager of Milan in 1987, Capello became a leading candidate to succeed Arrigo Sacchi as coach of the team, and he was formally appointed as manager of Milan in 1991.

== Managerial career ==
=== Early years ===
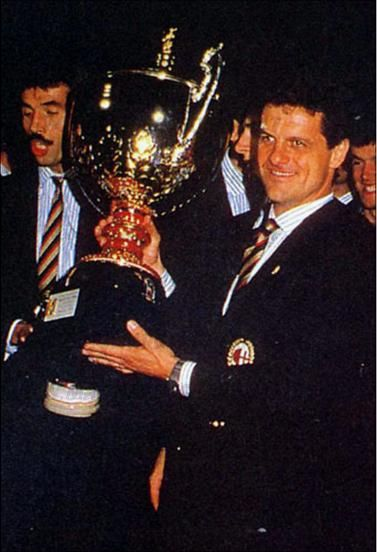
Capello holding the 1987 Mundialito de Clubs trophy alongside Pietro Paolo Virdis (left)

As a guest of the SFA, Capello began coaching on a three-week visit to Scotland. He worked with Craig Brown and Andy Roxburgh in the early 1980s. Capello coached training sessions with Clyde at Shawfield in Glasgow and took charge of the Scotland youth team training in Paisley.

Before going into management, Capello spent the early 1980s coaching the Milan youth teams. Bringing through talent such as Paolo Maldini and Alessandro Costacurta, he led the under-19s to numerous youth tournament successes. He completed the last of his coaching badges in 1986. He was promoted to first team coach in 1987, and worked as Nils Liedholm's assistant. His first experience as a head coach was leading Milan in the last six games of the 1986–87 season, replacing Liedholm and achieving UEFA Cup qualifications in a play-off with Sampdoria. The following season, however, Silvio Berlusconi hired Arrigo Sacchi as the new Rossoneri manager and Capello stepped aside, but still worked for the club.

A student at Coverciano, in 1984 he penned a research article entitled "The Zonal Marking System". While at Coverciano, Capello acted as general manager for a variety of sports, including baseball, ice hockey, volleyball and rugby union. After standing aside as manager, he was sent by Berlusconi on high-level business courses.

=== First spell at Milan ===
Capello replaced Sacchi as Milan manager in June 1991, and was a controversial appointment as he was seen as a Berlusconi "yes-man" compared to the demanding (both on the club's finances and on his players) but highly successful Sacchi. Capello largely retained the players and tactical systems put in place by Sacchi, though he replaced ageing central midfielder Carlo Ancelotti with a young Demetrio Albertini and signed goalkeeper Sebastiano Rossi. Allowing for more creative freedom from his attackers, Milan won the Serie A title undefeated in 1991–92.

He spent around £15 million on winger Gianluigi Lentini, breaking the world football transfer record. He also signed Fernando De Napoli, Stefano Eranio, Jean-Pierre Papin, Dejan Savićević and Zvonimir Boban. Already boasting talent such as Marco van Basten, Ruud Gullit, Paolo Maldini and Frank Rijkaard, Capello was one of the first managers to introduce a squad rotation approach. He played Rijkaard and Albertini as deep-lying central midfielders, allowing his wingers more license to attack. Milan dominated the league in the 1992–93 season, defending the Serie A title, and reached the 1993 UEFA Champions League final, losing 1—0 to Marseille. Milan remained unbeaten for 58 league games, between 19 May 1991 and 21 March 1993, which included an entire season in the league, a record in Italian football. They were finally defeated 1–0 by Parma after a goal from Faustino Asprilla.

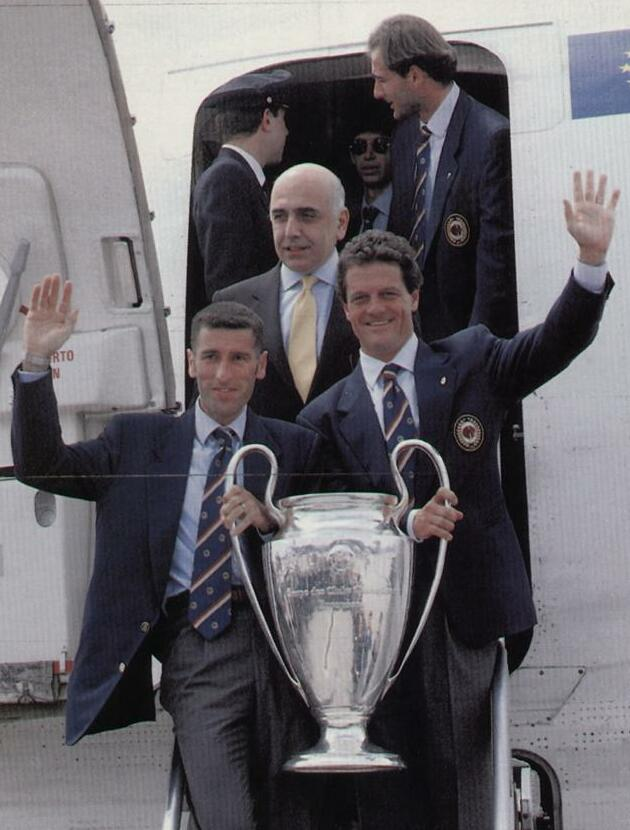
Capello and Mauro Tassotti with the 1994 UEFA Champions League final trophy

Building for the 1993–94 season, Capello signed Christian Panucci, Brian Laudrup, Florin Răducioiu and Marcel Desailly. Playing the former defender Desailly as a holding midfielder allowed the rest of the midfield to push on and attack. His side lost 3–2 to São Paulo in the 1993 Intercontinental Cup and 2-1 overall to Parma in the 1993 European Super Cup, but defended the Serie A title, the club's third consecutive Scudetto, and won the 1994 Champions League final with a 4–0 victory over Johan Cruyff's Barcelona "Dream Team". Due to injuries endured by several of the club's attacking stars, in particular Van Basten, Milan only scored 36 goals in 34 games in the league that season, but finished with the best defence in Italy, conceding just 15 goals. The club's back four at the time, primarily made up by Mauro Tassotti, Franco Baresi, Alessandro Costacurta and Maldini, is regarded as one of the greatest defences of all time; (Note: See) the club's defensive strength under Capello helped Milan's goalkeeper Rossi achieve the longest streak without conceding a goal in Serie A history during the 1993–94 season: in an 11-match span, from 12 December 1993 to 27 February 1994, Milan's defence went unbeaten for 929 consecutive minutes. The record was broken by Juventus' Gianluigi Buffon during the 2015–16 season.

With Van Basten and Papin gone, Capello recalled Gullit from Sampdoria and signed winger Paolo Di Canio; Milan struggled at the start of the 1994–95 season, losing in the 1994 Intercontinental Cup to Vélez Sársfield. However, they beat Sampdoria on penalties in the 1994 Supercoppa Italiana (securing the third Supercoppa title in a row), and Arsenal in the 1994 European Super Cup, and reached their third consecutive Champions League final in 1995, where they were defeated by Ajax. They finished in fourth place in the league, however, failing to qualify for the Champions League the following season.

Building for the 1995–96 season, Milan signed strikers George Weah and Roberto Baggio, as well as winger Paulo Futre; this created a selection problem as Capello already had several forwards and wingers in his squad, including Di Canio, Lentini, Savićević, Eranio, Roberto Donadoni and Marco Simone. Capello, however, was once again able to implement a squad rotation policy successfully, and even modified Milan's 4–4–2 formation at times, introducing an attacking trident in which the lone striker Weah was supported by Baggio and Savićević, thus allowing the two playmakers to play alongside each other. That season, Milan won the league title, the fourth in five years, by an eight-point margin.

=== First spell at Real Madrid ===
Capello was unveiled as the new Real Madrid coach in 1996. A major task was combining the attacking talents of Davor Šuker, Predrag Mijatović and Raúl in a single team, which Capello did by playing a three-man attack, in spite of his reputation for cautious and defensive football. A simple but effective tactic would be the long ball from defender Fernando Hierro to a sprinting Roberto Carlos, who would be supported on the left by Mijatović and Raúl; Roberto Carlos would then have the option of either going to goal or passing to Šuker, Mijatović or Raúl. He had a single season in charge of Real guiding the club to the Spanish league title in 1997. Real managed to edge out their bitter rivals Barcelona by just two points. Despite his tenure with Los Merengues lasting only a year, he was credited with bringing in a number of players such as Šuker, Mijatović, Roberto Carlos and Clarence Seedorf who helped the club establish their Champions League dominance over the next few years. Despite his success, he fell out with chairman Lorenzo Sanz and was not popular with fans or the Spanish press for "demoting" Raúl to the left-wing.

=== Second spell at Milan ===
Despite a belief by the Lazio owner Sergio Cragnotti that Capello had made a verbal agreement to coach his club, Capello instead returned to Milan for a brief and less successful spell. Some of the previous squad had departed, and others such as Franco Baresi were coming to the end of their careers. The squad had to be extensively rebuilt, and high quality signings such as Patrick Kluivert, Leonardo, Winston Bogarde, Christian Ziege, André Cruz and Ibrahim Ba did not gel. The team managed to win just 11 games all season, with a particular low occurring in March 1998 when they lost 4–1 to Juventus and Capello was sent off for protesting a decision by the referee. This was followed by a 5–0 defeat to Roma in May. Milan finished the 1997–98 Serie A season in tenth place, 30 points behind the champions Juventus, by which time Capello had already departed the club. Some of the players suggested that Capello had instituted a more lax training regime than he had in his previous spell. A run in the Coppa Italia ended when Milan were beaten in the final by Lazio 3–2 on aggregate, despite taking a 1–0 lead in the first leg. Capello took credit for Milan's title win the following season claiming, as he had rebuilt the side, that it was "my team".

=== Roma ===
Following his dismissal at Milan, Capello took a short break from coaching. He told a reporter that he "sat on a beach and thought about football". He also enjoyed a spell as a colour commentator for Italian television, participating in coverage of the 1999 Copa América. In May 1999, he moved to Roma, the club he had first joined as a player 30 years prior. His arrival was hailed by Roma president Franco Sensi, who said, "Capello is a winner and I believe in him." Capello was joined by Franco Baldini, who became the club's sporting director. Capello built his side around Marco Delvecchio, sometimes leaving Vincenzo Montella on the bench. Believing his squad lacked a world-class striker, Capello made a move to sign Ruud van Nistelrooy, but the deal was wrecked following a serious injury. His first season saw Roma finish sixth, made particularly disappointing as cross-city rivals Lazio won the title, and they were knocked out of the UEFA Cup by Leeds United.

Capello's breakthrough at the club occurred when he won the 2000–01 Serie A title, having signed Walter Samuel to strengthen his defence, and Gabriel Batistuta as a main goalscorer. Although the large fee for Batistuta was initially questioned, the Argentine striker scored a number of vital goals. With Roma, Capello switched from his trademark 4–4–2 to an aggressive 3–4–1–2 formation, which allowed the club's star playmaker and captain Francesco Totti to function in his preferred role as an attacking midfielder, while Cafu and Vincent Candela served as attack-minded wing-backs on the flanks. The season began in difficult fashion with Roma struggling for form and an angry fans protest at the club's Trigoria training complex which turned violent when players cars were attacked. Capello resisted calls for his resignation, and the team's results dramatically improved helped by the performances of the Brazilian midfielder Emerson. The title was sealed with a 3–1 victory over Parma at the Stadio Olimpico on 17 June, prompting a major pitch invasion by the Roma supporters. Capello was praised for fielding Montella, a player he had had a bust-up with just days before due to the fact that he often substituted him for tactical reasons in the second half, in the final match of the season; Montella, along with Totti and Batisuta went on to score in the title-deciding victory.

That was Roma's first major honour in a decade and only the third time ever that they had been crowned champions of Italy. Following the title win there was also a widespread belief that he had done a secret deal to succeed Sir Alex Ferguson at Manchester United. Ferguson had announced his decision to retire, with Capello a leading candidate to replace him allegedly going so far as to meet with the Manchester United chairman Martin Edwards. Capello did little to dispel the rumours when he remarked, "I like the spirit of English football and I would like to work in English football", adding that it was an honour to be pursued by the club.

Capello's link with United eventually came to nothing after Ferguson abandoned his decision to retire and signed a new contract, with Martin Edwards saying that United had been three or four days away from appointing a new manager, believed to be Capello, when Ferguson changed his mind. The 2001–02 season developed into a battle between Roma and Juventus. After a heated encounter between the teams, Capello used an interview to criticise Luciano Moggi from Juventus, particularly their dealings with players agents.

Capello signed a new contract in April 2002, worth £2.37 million a season. One of the highlights of the season was a 5–1 win over rivals Lazio which saw Montella score four goals. The defence of the title, however, was dealt a major blow when the club drew with bottom-placed Venezia, as Roma finished second in the table behind Juventus by a single point. The following season Roma failed to maintain a serious challenge, and finished in eighth.

Their Champions League ambitions were also ended following a defeat and a draw against Arsenal which saw them finish bottom of their group. Once again, it had been English opposition that had thwarted Roma in Europe. Roma lost the Coppa Italia final to Milan, with Capello particularly angered by supporters who waved banners calling on him to go. Capello's final year at Roma began well with the team playing much better football. They went on a seven-game winning streak before Christmas, including comfortable victories over Juventus and Inter Milan. This led to speculation linking him with Juventus, despite his past differences with Luciano Moggi. Capello believed he had taken Roma as far as he could, and began to seriously consider a move. In the run-in, the club's form dipped and they ended up finishing 11 points behind champions Milan.

=== Juventus ===
In 2004, Capello left debt-ridden Roma to sign with Juventus. His move came as a surprise because he had kept it such a secret, and because he had been engaged in a war of words with Luciano Moggi. One of Capello's first moves was to sign Emerson from Roma, further angering many of his critics who believed he had betrayed Roma. Capello's Juventus reached the quarter-finals of the 2004–05 and 2005–06 Champions Leagues before being eliminated by Liverpool and Arsenal respectively. Juventus also won the 2004–05 and 2005–06 Scudetti under Capello's leadership, but were later stripped of their trophies due to the team's involvement in the Calciopoli scandal.

In July 2006, with Juventus in the midst of the aforementioned scandal, Capello resigned as Juventus manager. Press reports strongly linked him with a move back to Real Madrid; new club president Ramón Calderón had publicly stated his hope that Capello would return for a second stint at the club and on 5 July 2006, the official Real Madrid website announced Capello's appointment.

=== Second spell at Real Madrid ===
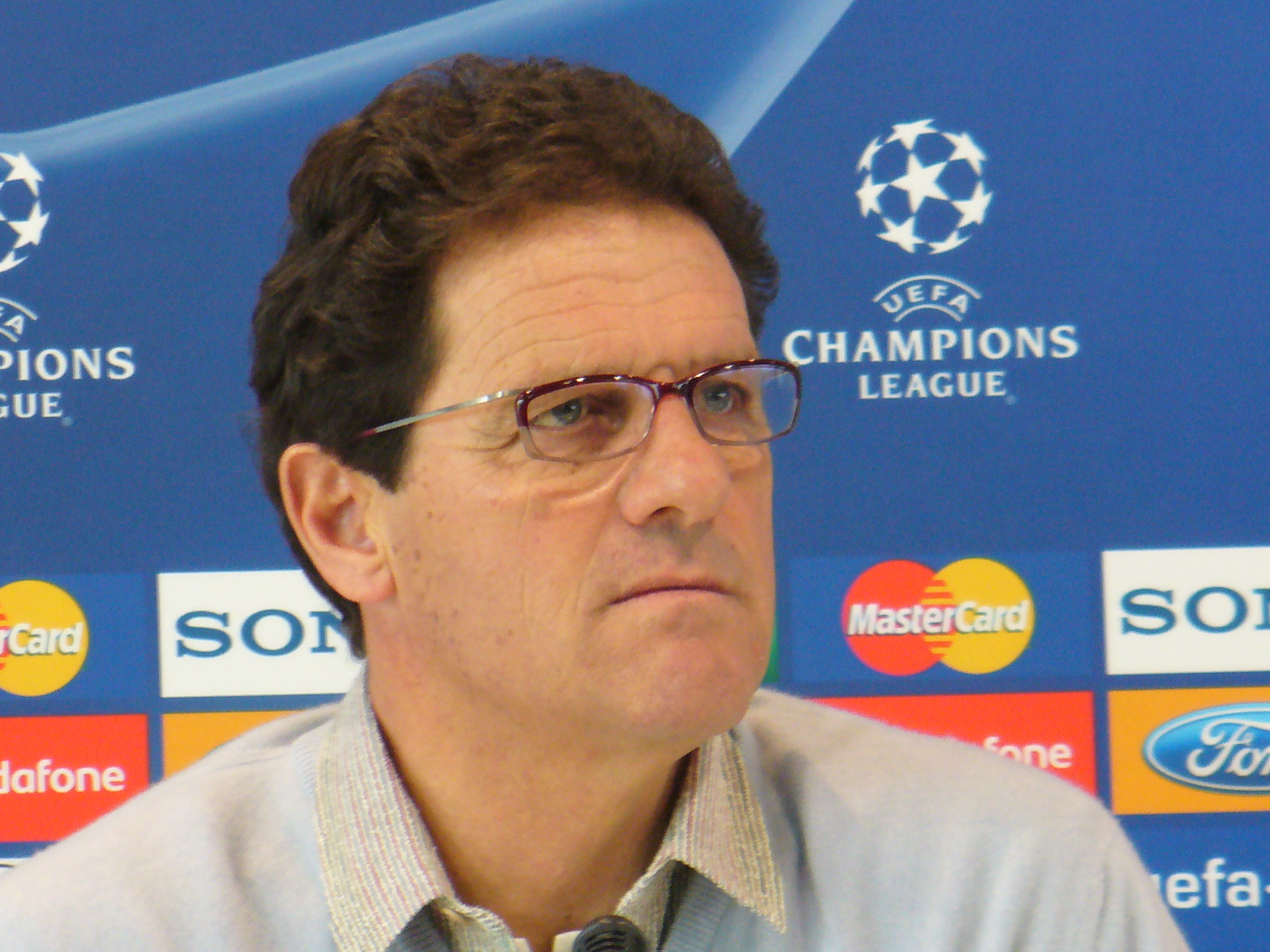
Capello during his second spell at Spanish side Real Madrid in 2007

In 2006, Capello took charge of a Real Madrid side suffering one of the longest spells without a trophy in their history. He quickly drew the disdain of Madrid's ardent supporters because of his defensive playing style. In interviews, Capello responded to those critics by saying that the beauty of attacking plays was old. He said that results were much more important than playing beautifully. He also added that "those days are over". His remit was to bring the title back to Madrid, a task that had been too much for five other coaches since 2003.

In Spain, he was commonly referred to as "Don Fabio". At Real Madrid, Capello had several high-profile falling outs. He was criticised for not playing David Beckham because of his contract wranglings and Ronaldo, who struggled for fitness and form. Capello also feuded with his compatriot Antonio Cassano; the two had previously had disputes at Roma.

On 20 February 2007, Real Madrid were forced to deny rumours that Capello would be leaving after that day's match. The next month, Madrid were again eliminated early from the Champions League by Bayern Munich, and were mired in fourth place in the league, six points behind Barcelona. Despite the unrest, Capello recalled Beckham, whose return was pivotal for the team's recovery. A string of successful results in the latter half of the season took Madrid to the top of the table, while Barça's results became inconsistent.

Real Madrid won their 30th league title on the final day of the season by beating Mallorca 3–1 at home. The victory was achieved after Capello substituted an injured Beckham and brought on José Antonio Reyes. Madrid had been 1–0 down prior to the substitution and Reyes turned the match scoring two goals. Despite winning La Liga, Capello was sacked on 28 June due to his pragmatic style of play at a club with recent memories of the individualistic and free-flowing, but ultimately unsuccessful, Galácticos era.

=== England ===
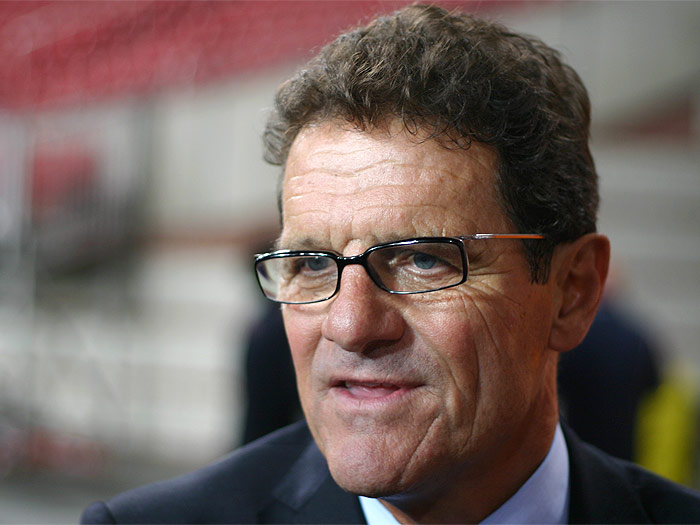
Capello as manager of the England national team in 2009

Capello was formally appointed as manager of the England national team on 14 December 2007. He began his day-to-day role on 7 January 2008 on a four-and-a-half-year deal. His annual pay was claimed to be £6 million. After being confirmed for the job, he announced it would be his last in football. Capello announced on the day of his unveiling that it was a dream come true to manage the England national team and that he hoped to learn the English language in the following month prior to his first official meeting with the players.

Capello was welcomed by many English fans and the press who hailed his appointment as a triumph, citing in particular his impressive trophy haul and his reputation as a disciplinarian in contrast to the excessive leniency perceived to have existed under his two predecessors, Sven-Göran Eriksson and Steve McClaren. His arrival generated some criticism, notably from then FIFA President Sepp Blatter, who said, "I would say it is a little surprising that the motherland of football has ignored a sacrosanct law or belief that the national team manager should be from the same country as the players."

England's first match with Capello as manager was at Wembley Stadium against Switzerland on 6 February 2008. On 31 January 2008, it was confirmed that a number of senior players including Sol Campbell and David Beckham had not been selected for Capello's debut squad. Goalkeeper Paul Robinson was also dropped after recent erratic form. Debut call-ups were handed to two players: Curtis Davies and Gabriel Agbonlahor, both of Aston Villa. Jermaine Jenas and Shaun Wright-Phillips scored in England's 2–1 win at Wembley. England lost their second match under Capello, an international friendly against France. England lost the game 1–0 after a Franck Ribéry penalty.

Capello's third game in charge was against the United States on 28 May 2008. England won the game 2–0 thanks to goals from John Terry and Steven Gerrard. On 1 June 2008, England beat Trinidad and Tobago 3–0. Capello had been rotating the captaincy around several senior players during his first few matches in charge. On 19 August 2008, he announced that Terry would be named the permanent captain. On 20 August 2008, England drew 2–2 with the Czech Republic after goals from Wes Brown and Joe Cole.

==== World Cup qualification ====
England opened Capello's first competitive campaign with a 2–0 victory over Andorra in Barcelona on 6 September 2008. Four days later, on 10 September, England played Croatia, the team that had already secured a spot at UEFA Euro 2008 in the final qualification matchday but won 3–2 which prevented England from qualifying as well. England won 4–1 with Theo Walcott scoring a hat-trick. The next qualification game was at Wembley just over a month later, on 11 October, against Kazakhstan. The game remained goalless at half-time, but England went on to win 5–1. A fourth-straight win on 15 October made this England's best ever start to a World Cup qualifying campaign as they beat Belarus 3–1. England rounded off 2008 by beating Germany 2–1 on 19 November. Goals from Terry and Matthew Upson secured the victory.

In the spring of 2009, England fell to a 2–0 defeat against reigning European champions Spain and beating Slovakia 4–0. In the summer of 2009, England played another friendly against the Netherlands, coming back from 2–0 down to secure a 2–2 draw away from home. Slovenia were beaten 2–1 in Wembley in the same year. England resumed their qualification campaign by beating Ukraine 2–1, on 1 April 2009, at Wembley. On 6 June, they travelled to Almaty and beat Kazakhstan 4–0, and four days later, they returned to Wembley and to beat Andorra again 6–0, making it seven wins out of seven in the qualification campaign. A notable feature of the campaign was the goalscoring form of Wayne Rooney: eight in seven games. With two in the friendly against Slovakia in March 2009, Rooney had scored ten goals in eight England games.

On 9 September 2009, Capello successfully guided England to qualification to the 2010 World Cup following a 5–1 win at home to Croatia. England's hopes of a 100% record in their 2010 qualifying campaign were ended with a 0–1 defeat in Ukraine in the final away match. However, a 3–0 victory over Belarus confirmed England as the top scorers in the UEFA zone with 34 goals, 6 ahead of second top scorers Spain. In November 2009, England were beaten 1–0 by Brazil in Qatar, Capello's third defeat as England manager.

==== 2010 World Cup ====
In March 2010, England played a friendly against Egypt and beat the African champions 3–1. Two months later, in the last home match before the World Cup, they beat Mexico by the same scoreline. In May 2010, England played a friendly against Japan at UPC-Arena, Graz, and won 2–1. The two goals conceded by Japan were both own goals by Marcus Tanaka and Yuji Nakazawa. After constant speculation linking him with the vacant managerial post at Inter Milan, on 2 June 2010, Capello committed himself to the England job until at least after Euro 2012. England's build-up to the World Cup started badly, with John Terry being stripped of the captaincy by Capello after his involvement in a tabloid scandal in February 2010.

Terry's successor as captain, Rio Ferdinand, was injured in a training session prior to England's opening match, resulting in his withdrawal from the squad. England drew the first game 1–1 with the United States due to an error by goalkeeper Robert Green, after which Capello declared the tournament Adidas Jabulani ball was "impossible to control". This was followed by a poor display against Algeria, leading to a 0–0 draw and widespread criticism of both Capello and the England team. Two days after the Algeria match in a media interview, John Terry hinted at dissatisfaction with Capello's team selection and stated that the players were bored with little to do in the evenings at their training base; he also said that a clear-the-air team meeting would take place that evening. The next day, Capello responded by saying that Terry had made "a very big mistake" in challenging his authority to the media. On 23 June, Capello led England into the round of 16 of the World Cup after they beat Slovenia 1–0. However, they were beaten in their first knockout match 4–1 by Germany.

With Germany leading 2–1, Frank Lampard scored a 20-yard strike. However, even though the ball clearly bounced a full yard over the German goal-line, all the match officials failed to see it and did not award a goal. As England pressed forward in the second half, they conceded two counter-attack goals. Nevertheless, England's performance led to much criticism from fans, the media, and pundits alike. After England's elimination, Capello was criticized for imposing a strict military regime at England's Bloemfontein training camp, and not allowing his senior players to have tactical input. His 4–4–2 formation was derided as "outdated" with Steven Gerrard's positioning on the left of midfield also criticized.

Capello's squad selection was questioned, with the selection of an unfit Ledley King and out of form Emile Heskey, as well as the surprising omission of Theo Walcott also coming under fire. Capello's indecision over his starting goalkeeper was cited as a reason for Green's error in England's opening match with the United States. On 2 July 2010, The Football Association (FA) announced that Capello would remain as the manager of the England national team following speculation over his future following the World Cup.

==== Euro 2012 qualification ====
England kicked off their Euro 2012 qualifying campaign with two wins, 4–0 against Bulgaria and 3–1 away against Switzerland, yet could only draw 0–0 against group leaders Montenegro at Wembley. Capello made some changes afterwards, with Ferdinand and Gerrard out of the picture. John Terry was reinstated as captain to much criticism. The traditional 4–4–2 was transformed to 4–3–3, with Darren Bent as centre forward and Rooney as a left-sided forward. The result was successful, as England beat Wales 2–0 at the Millennium Stadium on 26 March 2011. England's next game was at Wembley against Switzerland on 4 June 2011, which they recovered from a 0–2 deficit to draw 2–2 with goals from Frank Lampard and Ashley Young.

After a narrow 1–0 win against Wales at Wembley, Capello claimed that several England players were "mentally fragile" and suggested he intended to reinvent his squad once Euro 2012 qualification had been sealed. On 7 October 2011, England qualified for the European Championships with a 2–2 draw in Montenegro.

England completed their campaign with a record of five wins, three draws and no defeats. England completed an unbeaten 2011 with 1–0 friendly victories over Spain and Sweden in November 2011. Capello resigned on 8 February 2012 following the FA's removal of the captaincy from John Terry.

=== Russia ===
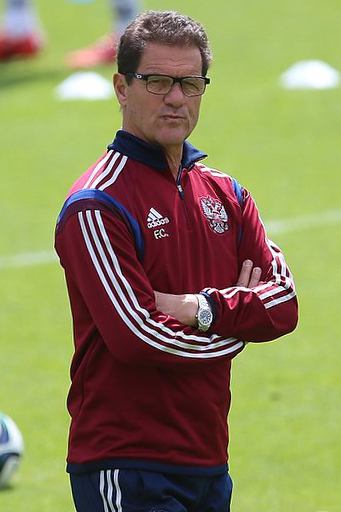
Capello as manager of Russia in 2015

On 26 July 2012, Capello became manager of the Russia national team, following the resignation of Dick Advocaat. His first game in charge was a 1–1 draw with Ivory Coast. Capello's first competitive game in charge of Russia was the opening match of the 2014 World Cup qualification campaign, a 2–0 victory at home to Northern Ireland. He led Russia into the 2014 FIFA World Cup qualification finals, finishing first in Group F. In January 2014, Capello committed his future to the Russia national team until the end of the 2018 World Cup in Russia.

At the 2014 World Cup, Russia were knocked out at the group stage, finishing third after a 1–1 draw against Algeria in their final match. During qualifying for UEFA Euro 2016, Capello had six games as the head coach of Russia with results: two wins, two draws and two losses. On 14 June 2015, Russia lost 1–0 to Austria. Thereafter, on 14 July, Capello was sacked as Russian manager.

=== Jiangsu Suning and retirement ===
On 11 June 2017, Capello signed a contract with Chinese club Jiangsu Suning. The club finished as the 12th (out of 16 teams) in 2017 Chinese Super League. On 28 March 2018, Capello was sacked after only three games into the new season. In April, later that year, he officially announced that he had retired from coaching.

== Style of management ==
When Capello gets angry, hardly anyone dares to look him in the eye, and if he gives you an opportunity and you don't take it, you might as well be selling hot dogs outside the stadium, basically. You don't go to Capello with your problems. Capello isn't your mate. He doesn't chat with the players, not like that. He's the sergente di ferro, the iron sergeant, and it's not a good sign when he calls for you. Then again, you never know. He breaks people down and builds them up. [...] After the very first training session, all the others in the team had gone in to shower, and I was completely exhausted. I would have gladly called it a day as well. But a goalie from the youth team came over from the touchline, and I twigged what was going on. Italo was going to feed me balls – bam, bam! They came at me from all angles. There were crosses, passes, he chucked the ball, he gave me wall passes, and I shot at goal, one shot after another, and I was never allowed to leave the box, the penalty area. That was my area, he said. That's where I was supposed to be and shoot, shoot, and there was no chance of taking a break or taking it easy. The pace was relentless. [...] "I'm gonna knock Ajax out of your body", he [Capello] said. "I don't need that Dutch style. One, two, one, two, play the wall, play nice and technical. Dribble through the whole team. I can get by without that. I need goals. You understand? I need to get that Italian mindset into you. You've got to get that killer instinct." [...] Under Capello, I was transformed. His toughness was infectious, and I became less of an artiste and more of a bruiser who wanted to win at any price. — Zlatan Ibrahimović, on how Capello trained his strikers at Juventus.

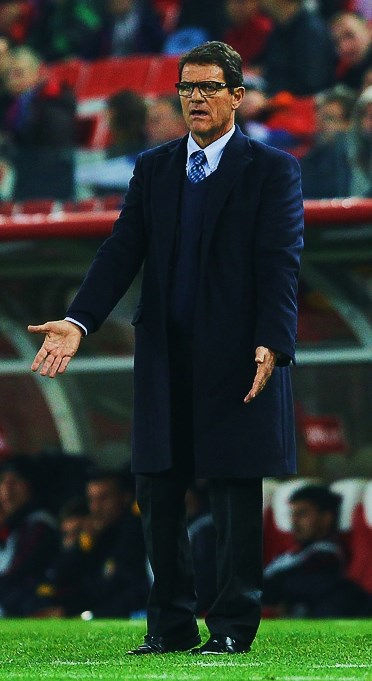
Capello managing Russia in 2014

Considered to be one of the greatest and most successful football managers of all time, Capello has been described as being a "pragmatic" coach, and is known for his tactical versatility and ability to adapt his formations to tactical systems which best suit his players. He was nicknamed Don Fabio by the Spanish media during his time with Real Madrid. While he has drawn praise for his success, tactical awareness, leadership, and effectiveness as a manager, as well as for often developing several promising young players, he has also drawn criticism at times from both players and pundits for being overly strict and defensive minded as a coach, which has led to many well-publicised disagreements with several of his players, as well as other managers, including Dejan Savićević, Roberto Baggio, Antonio Cassano, Alessandro Del Piero, Ronaldo, Carlo Ancelotti and Arrigo Sacchi. However, he did like to have players with strong leadership qualities and dressing room personalities in his teams. Capello has described his own coaching philosophy as one of copying and developing. He has also occasionally been criticised by pundits for his perceived arrogance and stubbornness as a manager. In 2008, when writing for The Guardian, David Lacey likened Capello to Alf Ramsey for their shared belief in the importance of a solid defensive base, while also praising him for his ability to identify a problem and deal with it in a quick and successful manner, his ability to command respect in the dressing room and maintain a professional attitude with his players, and his ability to manage press conferences effectively. Capello was known for his defensive style, as well as his use of high pressing and quick counter-attacks to score goals. Due to his strong character and tough personality, Ibrahimović nicknamed Capello "sergente di ferro" in his autobiography (the "iron sergeant" in Italian).

In his highly successful first spell with Milan, Capello retained many of the players and the 4–4–2 tactical system put in place by Sacchi, although his style of management was less demanding and rigorous than Sacchi's, which initially gave his forwards more creative freedom to attack; he also introduced several younger players into the first team. In subsequent seasons, following injuries to several attacking players, he adopted a more conservative 4–1–4–1 formation, in which the team's strong defensive line, further protected by Marcel Desailly, a former centre back who was converted to a holding midfielder by Capello, provided the foundation for much of the team's success, and also gave the wingers and more creative, offensive-minded midfielders licence to attack. In the final season of his first spell at the club, Capello often rotated several of the team's attacking players in order to get the best out of each them without offsetting the balance within the team; he also abandoned the club's trademark 4–4–2 formation for a 4–3–2–1 formation at times, featuring an attacking trident that allowed the team's two offensive playmakers, Baggio and Savićević, to play alongside each other, behind the club's main striker George Weah.

In his first spell with Real Madrid, Capello once again built a title-winning side based on a strong defence and an efficient playing style, but also fielded three strikers – Davor Šuker, Predrag Mijatović, and Raúl – while promoting several other promising young players to the first team. A key component of the team's success was the club's new left-back Roberto Carlos, who excelled at making overlapping attacking runs to beat the opposition's defensive line and get on the end of Fernando Hierro's long balls from the back; the role gave him the freedom to either run on goal or look to deliver the ball to one of the team's strikers. He was also criticised in the media, however, for using striker Raúl as a left winger at times.

When you talk about me and Capello, you talk about two personalities. If I have an opinion and I don't agree with you that's it, and he was the same. Capello used the guys with strong personalities – I remember he did it with [striker] Predrag Mijatovic as well – he motivated the team by creating a discussion with somebody, by looking for conflicts. And when he did, the team would go out and kick butt. — Clarence Seedorf in 2010 on Capello's first spell at Real Madrid

During the 2000–01 title-winning season with Roma, Capello adopted a 3–4–1–2 formation, which made use of a three-man back-line and attacking wing-backs (Cafu and Vincent Candela), while Francesco Totti operated as the team's advanced playmaker behind a main striker and a more mobile, creative forward; the offensive trio was supported by two hard-working and aggressive defensive minded midfielders, namely Emerson, and Damiano Tommasi. Following the purchase of talented youngster Cassano the next season, Capello switched to a 3–5–2 formation.

At Juventus, Capello rejected the club's board members' requests to field a three-man front line and once again reverted to his preferred 4–4–2 formation. Capello won consecutive league titles, and put together a balanced and efficient side which was built upon a strong and highly organised back-line, which was further supported by two dynamic, defensive-minded box-to-box midfielders in the centre, such as Manuele Blasi, Stephen Appiah, Alessio Tacchinardi, Emerson, and later Patrick Vieira, who both alternated defensive and playmaking duties in midfield; the team's attacking wingers, Pavel Nedvěd and Mauro Camoranesi, were required both to drop back defensively and also assist the strikers from an offensive standpoint. Capello usually partnered the team's main striker David Trezeguet alongside the emerging Zlatan Ibrahimović up-front, with the latter playing in a more creative role, while the team's captain, Alessandro Del Piero, was used mostly as a substitute. Capello also introduced several younger players into the squad, such as the Romanian striker Adrian Mutu, and left-back Giorgio Chiellini; the latter's performances later prompted Capello to bench Jonathan Zebina and shift left-back Gianluca Zambrotta to right-back, in order to accommodate the youngster into the first team.

In his second spell with Real Madrid, Capello implemented a 4–2–3–1 formation, which made use of two defensive-minded full-backs, two defensive midfielders, and two wingers who also often tracked back; however, as a result, the club's main striker, Ruud van Nistelrooy, was often isolated, while the team's efficient playing style was described as being boring in the media, and Capello was frequently derided for his overly defensive tactics. Despite the criticism he endured, Capello made several bold decisions which allowed several talented players to co-exist, benching Ronaldo, and reinstating David Beckham into the starting line-up, as well as Brazilian forward Robinho, Spanish midfielder Guti, and centre-back Iván Helguera, who were initially out of favour with the manager at the start of the season. He was also able to get the best out of new signings van Nistelrooy, Emerson, Mahamadou Diarra and Fabio Cannavaro, despite their poor form at the beginning of the season. He was consequently able to create an organised, determined, and unified team environment through his disciplined and pragmatic approach; he ultimately led the club to an eight match unbeaten streak to come back from behind and claim the Liga title, although he was sacked at the end of the season.

== Personal life ==
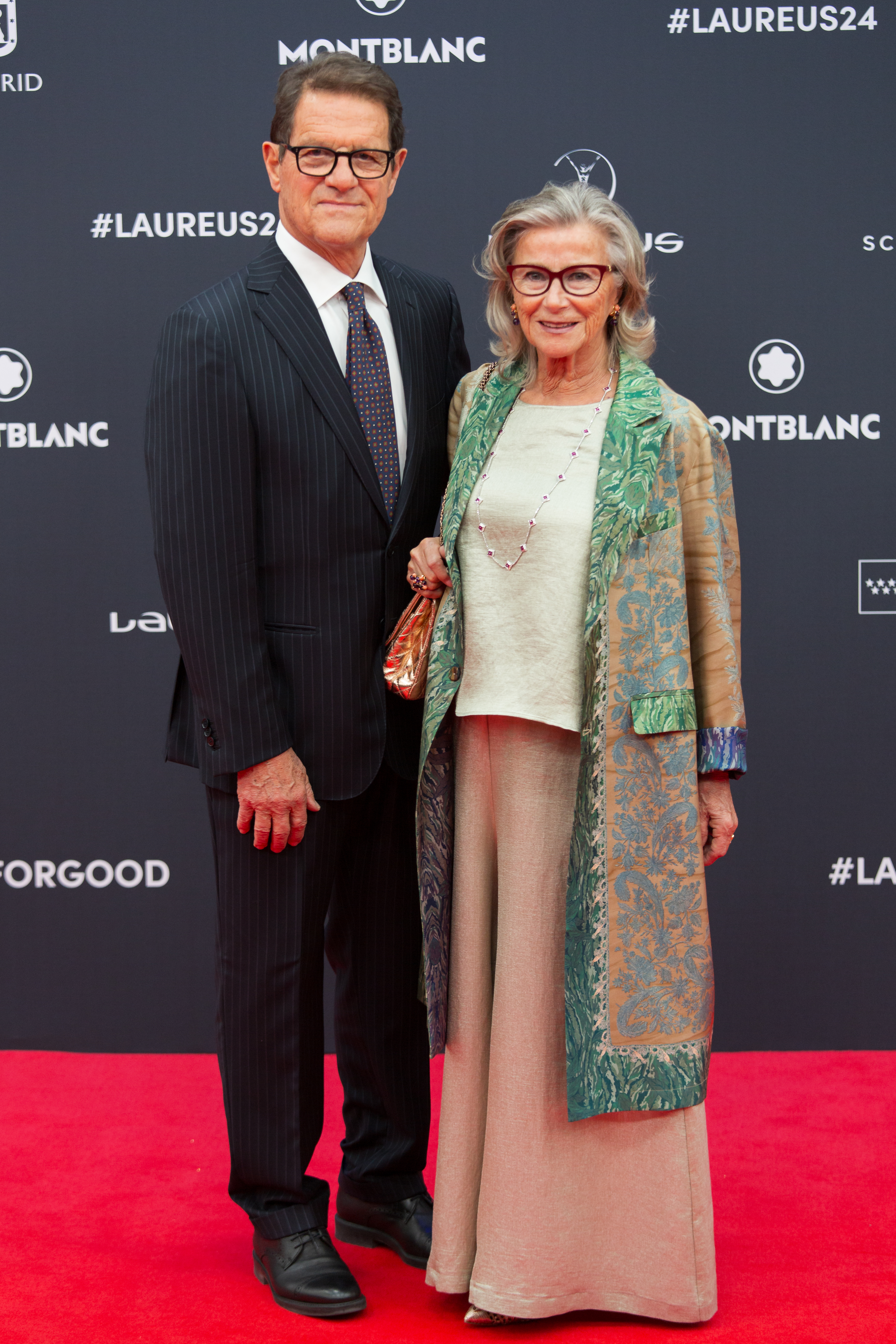
Capello with his wife, Laura Ghisi, in 2024

Capello was born in San Canzian d'Isonzo, near Gorizia, in north-eastern Italy, in what was then the Allied-occupied Zone A of the Julian March. His parents were Guerrino and Evelina Capello. Capello is a devout Catholic who prays twice a day, and he expressed admiration for Pope Benedict XVI. His father, a schoolteacher, played football, and his uncle Mario Tortul was also a football player; for Triestina, Padova, Sampdoria and the Italy national team during the 1960s. Capello spent his entire working life in football. He has been married to his wife Laura, whom he first met on a bus as a teenager, for over 40 years. He is represented by his son Pier Filippo, who acts as his agent. In January 2008, Italian police announced that they were launching an investigation into tax irregularities by Capello. The probe, however, was dismissed as routine by Capello's spokesmen, who said this was part of a wider investigation into a number of wealthy Italians. The FA revealed that they had known about the upcoming probe when they had appointed Capello, and expected no charges to be brought.

Capello is a fine art enthusiast. His art collection is estimated to be worth £10 million. His favourite artist is reportedly Wassily Kandinsky.

Capello holds right-wing political views, despite having previously been a self-described "socialist" in the 1960s, and subsequently a long-time supporter of the Christian Democrats; he was later a long-time supporter of Silvio Berlusconi and his centre-right party Forza Italia. He attracted controversy when he expressed admiration for Spanish dictator Francisco Franco in 2006 and the "legacy of order" he believed him to have left in Spain. He later distanced himself from these comments, however, stating that he did not intend to praise dictatorships. In 2002, he also admitted to having voted for the Northern Italian right-wing separatist political party Lega once in the past, as well as the Italian Socialist Party and the Republicans in his youth. He has rejected the label of a "conservative" however, noting that he supported the trade unions, stating: "I have great respect for all they have done to alleviate the exploitation of workers."

== Career statistics ==
=== Club ===
Appearances and goals by club, season and competition
Club	Season	League			Coppa Italia		Europe		Total	
Club	Season	Division	Apps	Goals	Apps	Goals	Apps	Goals	Apps	Goals
SPAL	1963–64	Serie A	4	0						
SPAL	1964–65	Serie B	9	0						
SPAL	1965–66	Serie A	20	1						
SPAL	1966–67	Serie A	16	2						
SPAL	Total		49	3						
Roma	1967–68	Serie A	11	1						
Roma	1968–69	Serie A	25	6						
Roma	1969–70	Serie A	26	4						
Roma	Total		62	11						
Juventus	1970–71	Serie A	27	5						
Juventus	1971–72	Serie A	29	9						
Juventus	1972–73	Serie A	27	3						
Juventus	1973–74	Serie A	27	4						
Juventus	1974–75	Serie A	28	3						
Juventus	1975–76	Serie A	27	3						
Juventus	Total		165	27						
AC Milan	1976–77	Serie A	26	1						
AC Milan	1977–78	Serie A	28	3						
AC Milan	1978–79	Serie A	8	0						
AC Milan	1979–80	Serie A	3	0						
AC Milan	Total		65	4						
Career total			341	45						

=== International ===
Appearances and goals by national team and year
National team	Year	Apps	Goals
Italy	1972	6	1
Italy	1973	8	3
Italy	1974	6	1
Italy	1975	4	1
Italy	1976	8	2
Total		32	8

== Managerial statistics ==
As of 14 March 2018

Managerial record by team and tenure
Team	Nat	From	To	Record							
Team	Nat	From	To	G	W	D	L	GF	GA	GD	Win %
Milan (caretaker)	(Italy)	5 April 1987	3 July 1987	7	3	3	1	7	3	+4	42.86
Milan	(Italy)	20 June 1991	31 May 1996	249	142	77	30	410	169	+241	57.03
Real Madrid	(Spain)	31 May 1996	23 June 1997	48	31	12	5	96	41	+55	64.58
Milan	(Italy)	24 June 1997	20 May 1998	44	16	14	14	53	52	+1	36.36
Roma	(Italy)	6 June 1999	28 May 2004	241	118	73	50	402	222	+180	48.96
Juventus	(Italy)	28 May 2004	4 July 2006	105	68	24	13	181	81	+100	64.76
Real Madrid	(Spain)	6 July 2006	28 June 2007	50	28	12	10	91	55	+36	56.00
England	(England)	14 December 2007	8 February 2012	42	28	8	6	89	35	+54	66.67
Russia	(Russia)	16 July 2012	13 July 2015	33	17	11	5	56	22	+34	51.52
Jiangsu Suning	(China)	11 June 2017	28 March 2018	24	8	7	9	36	34	+2	33.33
Total				843	459	241	143	1,421	714	+707	54.45

== Honours ==
=== Player ===
SPAL

- Serie B promotion: 1964–65

Roma

- Coppa Italia: 1968–69

Juventus

- Serie A: 1971–72, 1972–73, 1974–75

Milan

- Serie A: 1978–79
- Coppa Italia: 1976–77

=== Manager ===
Milan

- Serie A: 1991–92, 1992–93, 1993–94, 1995–96
- Coppa Italia runner-up: 1997–98
- Supercoppa Italiana: 1992, 1993, 1994
- UEFA Champions League: 1993–94; runner-up: 1992–93, 1994-95
- European Super Cup: 1994
- Intercontinental Cup runner-up: 1993, 1994

Real Madrid

- La Liga: 1996–97, 2006–07

Roma

- Serie A: 2000–01
- Supercoppa Italiana: 2001

Juventus

- Serie A: 2004–05 (Revoked), 2005–06 (Revoked)

=== Individual ===
- Panchina d'Oro: 1991–92, 1993–94, 1997, 2000–01
- Serie A Coach of the Year: 2005
- BBC Sports Personality of the Year Coach Award: 2009
- Marca Leyenda: 2011
- Gran Galà del Calcio Critics' Award: 2011
- Italian Football Hall of Fame: 2013
- ESPN 20th Greatest Manager of All Time: 2013
- France Football 21st Greatest Manager of All Time: 2019
- World Soccer 24th Greatest Manager of All Time: 2013
- AIAC Football Leader Career Award: 2016
- AC Milan Hall of Fame

== Bibliography ==
- Ryan, Mark (2008). Fabio Capello: The Man. The Dream. The Inside Story. JR Books. ISBN 978-1-906217-78-5.
- Marcotti, Gabriele (2008). Capello: The Man Behind England's World Cup Dream. Bantam Books. ISBN 978-0-553-82566-4.
