= Paolo Negro =

Italian footballer and coach

Personal information
- Full name: Paolo Negro
- Date of birth: 16 April 1972 (age 54)
- Place of birth: Arzignano, Italy
- Height: 1.82 m (6 ft 0 in)
- Position: Defender

Youth career
- 1988–1990: Brescia

Senior career*
Years	Team	Apps	(Gls)
1990–1992	Bologna	49	(0)
1992–1993	Brescia	26	(1)
1993–2005	Lazio	264	(19)
2005–2007	Siena	49	(4)
Total		388	(24)

International career
1991–1994	Italy U21	10	(2)
1994–2000	Italy	8	(0)

Managerial career
- 2010–2011: Cerveteri
- 2012–2014: Zagarolo
- 2016–2017: Voluntas Spoleto
- 2021: Siena
Medal record
Representing Italy
Association football
UEFA European Championship
Silver medal – second place	2000
UEFA European Under-21 Championship
Winner	1994 France
- * Club domestic league appearances and goals

Paolo Negro Cavaliere OMRI (Italian pronunciation: [ˈpaːolo ˈneːɡro]; born 16 April 1972) is an Italian former professional footballer and manager who played as a centre back or as a right back.

In an eighteen-year professional career, Negro amassed Serie A totals of 362 games and 24 goals, mainly for Lazio, winning eight major titles with the club, including one national championship and the 1999 Cup Winners' Cup. He also appeared with Italy at Euro 2000, where they finished in 2nd place.

== Club career ==
=== Early career: Brescia and Bologna ===
Negro was born in Arzignano, Province of Vicenza. He was a youth player at Brescia Calcio. He joined Bologna in 1990, and made his Serie A debut against Genoa, on 28th October 1990, amassing over 50 overall appearances in his first two professional seasons, the latter spent in Serie B.

=== Brescia and Lazio ===
After a quick return to Brescia, he then moved to Rome's Lazio in the summer of 1993.

Negro won the Coppa Italia during the 1997–98 season, also reaching the UEFA Cup final that year with Lazio, losing out to Inter. The following season, Lazio won the Supercoppa Italiana, and placed second in Serie A behind Milan, but won the 1998–99 UEFA Cup Winners' Cup, although he was an unused substitute in the club's 2–1 defeat of Mallorca in the final. These successes were immediately followed by the UEFA Super Cup in 1999, defeating UEFA Champions League winners Manchester United in the final. During the 1999–2000 season, he helped Lazio win the Serie A title, with two goals in 26, appearances, also helping Lazio to capture the Coppa Italia and the Supercoppa Italiana over Inter, winning the first edition of the Pallone d'Argento in 2000. The prize is awarded to a player who has stood out during the course of a season, both for their discipline as well as for their footballing performances. Lazio also reached the quarter-finals of the UEFA Champions League that season.

The following season, however, on 17 December 2000, Negro scored an own goal in a derby match against Roma, who eventually lifted the scudetto, while Lazio finished the season in third place. During the 2003–04 season, Negro was able to capture his third Coppa Italia title with Lazio, beating Juventus in the final.

=== Siena ===
Having joined Siena in 2005, Negro scored a dramatic 85th-minute goal to defeat former side Lazio 2–1 on the final day of the 2006–07 season. Without it, Siena would have been relegated to the second division, instead of Chievo. He appeared a further 50 times in the league in two campaigns, for a total of 363 official games.

In August 2008, almost one year after retiring, 36-year-old Negro underwent a trial at Serie B club Modena, but nothing came of it.

== International career ==
On 16 November 1994, Negro made his debut for Italy, in a 2–1 home loss against Croatia in a UEFA Euro 1996 qualifier. He received a total of eight caps with the Azzurri between 1994, and 2000, and he was selected by manager Dino Zoff to be a member of the Italian squad that took part at Euro 2000, tournament, where the national team reached the final, finishing the tournament in second place behind France.

Previously, Negro was an essential member of the Italy U21 side under Cesare Maldini, as they defeated Portugal in the 1994 European Championship final, in Montpellier.

== Coaching career ==
In June 2011, he passed the category 2 coaching exams, which made him eligible to coach Lega Pro teams.

On 30 December 2010, Negro took his first coaching job, becoming the boss of Promozione amateurs Cerveteri, a team from Lazio with former experiences in the professional tiers of Italian football. He left the club after only three months, resigning on 23 March 2011 due to poor results. On 26 January 2012, Negro accepted a job offer as head coach of Serie D amateurs Zagarolo.

On 5 January 2015, after Mark Iuliano's promotion as new head coach of Latina, Negro was appointed as a new youth coach for the club.

On 2017, he became a youth coach for Cragnotti FC, a youth-only club founded by Massimo Cragnotti, son of former Lazio owner Sergio Cragnotti.

On 15 December 2021 he took on his first role as head coach in a professional club, joining Siena, with Franco Paleari as his assistant. He left his role at Siena only two weeks later, on 29 December, following the appointment of Pasquale Padalino as new head coach.

== Honours ==
Lazio

- Serie A: 1999–2000
- Coppa Italia: 1997–98, 1999–2000, 2003–04
- Supercoppa Italiana: 1998, 2000
- UEFA Cup Winners' Cup: 1998–99
- UEFA Super Cup: 1999

Italy

- UEFA European Under-21 Championship: 1994
- UEFA European Championship runner-up: 2000

Individual

- Pallone d'Argento: 1999–2000

Orders

- 5th Class / Knight: Cavaliere Ordine al Merito della Repubblica Italiana: 2000
