= Pallone d'Argento =

Italian football player award (2000–2017)

Silver Ball
- Sport: Association football
- Awarded for: Serie A players for their talent, sporting fairness, and moral qualities
- Local name: Pallone d'Argento – Coppa Giaime Fiumanò (Italian)
- Country: Italy
- Presented by: Italian Sports Press Association

History
- First award: 2000
- Editions: 18
- Final award: 2017
- First winner: (Italy) Paolo Negro
- Most recent: (Italy) Andrea Belotti

The Pallone d'Argento – Coppa Giaime Fiumanò (Silver Ball) was an annual award instituted by the Unione Stampa Sportiva Italiana (Italian Sports Press Association) or USSI. It was presented to Serie A players for their talent as well as sporting fairness and moral qualities.

== Winners ==
Season	Player	Club	Ref.
1999–00	(Italy) Paolo Negro	Lazio	
2000–01	(Italy) Damiano Tommasi	Roma	
2001–02	(Argentina) Javier Zanetti	Internazionale	
2002–03	(Italy) Ciro Ferrara	Juventus	
2003–04	(Ukraine) Andriy Shevchenko	Milan	
2004–05	(Italy) Gianfranco Zola	Cagliari	
2005–06	(Italy) Luca Toni	Fiorentina	
2006–07	(Brazil) Kaká	Milan	
2007–08	(Italy) Francesco Totti	Roma	
2008–09	(Italy) Alessandro Del Piero	Juventus	
2009–10	(Italy) Morgan De Sanctis	Napoli	
2010–11	(Italy) Antonio Di Natale	Udinese	
2011–12	(Italy) Andrea Pirlo	Juventus	
2012–13	(Italy) Stephan El Shaarawy	Milan	
2013–14	(Italy) Giuseppe Rossi	Fiorentina	
2014–15	(Italy) Francesco Acerbi	Sassuolo	
2015–16	(Italy) Alessandro Florenzi	Roma	
2016–17	(Italy) Andrea Belotti	Torino	

== See also ==
- Oscar del Calcio
