= Giuseppe Favalli =

Italian footballer (born 1972)

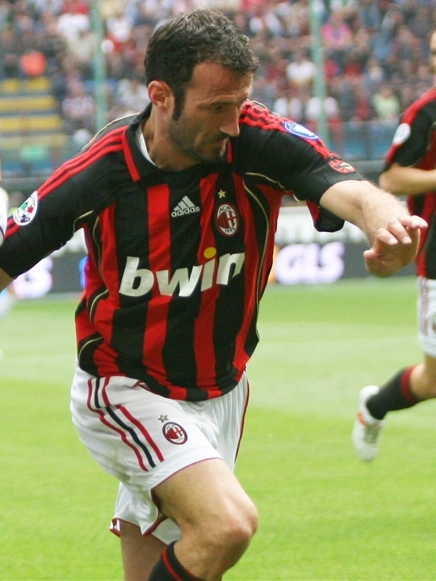
- Favalli playing for AC Milan in 2007

Personal information
- Date of birth: 8 January 1972 (age 54)
- Place of birth: Orzinuovi, Italy
- Height: 1.80 m (5 ft 11 in)
- Position: Defender

Youth career
- 1987–1988: Cremonese

Senior career*
Years	Team	Apps	(Gls)
1988–1992	Cremonese	94	(3)
1992–2004	Lazio	298	(4)
2004–2006	Inter Milan	49	(0)
2006–2010	AC Milan	80	(2)
Total		521	(9)

International career
1989–1990	Italy U18	9	(1)
1989–1994	Italy U21	24	(2)
1992	Italy U23	6	(0)
1994–2004	Italy	8	(0)
- * Club domestic league appearances and goals

Giuseppe Favalli (Italian pronunciation: [dʒuˈzɛppe faˈvalli]; born 8 January 1972) is an Italian former professional footballer. A versatile, consistent, tenacious and experienced defender, Favalli was capable of playing as a centre-back as well as on the left or right flank as a full-back.

After beginning his career with Cremonese in 1988, he played for Serie A clubs Lazio, Inter Milan and AC Milan. At international level, Favalli represented the Italy national team on eight occasions between 1994 and 2004, and was a member of his nation's UEFA Euro 2004 squad. He was also a member of the under-23 side that took part at the 1992 Summer Olympics.

== Club career ==
=== Cremonese ===
Favalli started his career with then-Serie B squad Cremonese in 1988. Following their promotion to Serie A in 1989 he made his top flight debut in a 2–1 defeat to Inter Milan on 27 August 1989.

=== Lazio ===
Favalli's strong performance resulted in him being signed by Lazio during the summer of 1992. Following the departure of Alessandro Nesta to AC Milan in 2002, he became team captain. During his time with Lazio, he won one Scudetto, three Coppa Italia, two Supercoppa Italiana, the Cup Winners Cup and the UEFA Super Cup, as well as establishing himself as a fan favourite. In 12 seasons with the Biancocelesti, he made 401 appearances in all competitions (becoming the player with second most appearances in Lazio's history behind Stefan Radu), scoring six goals.

=== Inter Milan ===
Favalli later moved to Inter Milan joining the club on 1 June 2004 on a free transfer. With Inter, he won the Coppa Italia twice, in 2005 and 2006 meaning he had won the trophy in three consecutive years (2004, 2005 and 2006). He also won his second Scudetto with Inter following the Calciopoli scandal which saw Juventus stripped of the 2006 title and it being awarded to Inter. However, he was not always chosen to start for the team and the arrival of Fabio Grosso after the 2006 FIFA World Cup meant he was deemed surplus to the squad and as a result, did not have his contract renewed at the end of the 2006 season.

=== AC Milan ===
Favalli was then subsequently signed by Milan on a free transfer, as a replacement for his former Lazio teammate Giuseppe Pancaro, but once again, with players such as Kakha Kaladze and Paolo Maldini ahead of him in the ranks playing left-back, he would spend the seasons mainly on the bench. In the 2007 UEFA Champions League Final, he appeared as a substitute late in the match which saw Milan win their seventh European Cup/UEFA Champions League in a 2–1 win over Liverpool. He was affectionately nicknamed Favallinho by Milan supporters after he scored his only two goals of the 2006–07 Serie A campaign in back-to-back wins over Empoli and Messina in April 2007. Towards the end of his career, he was used as a centre-back by the Rossoneri.

On 1 July 2010, Favalii was released by Milan at age 38, then subsequently retired.

== International career ==
Favalli has represented Italy at under-18 level, as well winning the 1992 UEFA European Under-21 Championship and playing at the 1992 Summer Olympics in Barcelona with the Italy under-21 side.

Favalli earned eight full caps for the Italian senior side between 1994 and 2004. He was part of the Italy squad that took part at UEFA Euro 2004; he made only one appearance throughout the tournament, replacing Gennaro Gattuso in the 76th minute of Italy's 1–1 draw with Sweden in the team's second group match. Italy performed below expectations and exited at the group stage on direct encounters, following a three-way five point tie with Sweden and Denmark; the later two sides qualified for the quarter-finals at their expense.

== Career statistics ==
Italy national team
Year	Apps	Goals
1994	1	0
1998	1	0
2004	6	0
Total	8	0

== Honours ==
Lazio

- Serie A: 1999–2000
- Coppa Italia: 1997–98, 1999–2000, 2003–04
- Supercoppa Italiana: 1998, 2000
- UEFA Cup Winners' Cup: 1998–99
- UEFA Super Cup: 1999

Inter Milan

- Serie A: 2005–06
- Coppa Italia: 2004–05, 2005–06
- Supercoppa Italiana: 2005

AC Milan

- UEFA Champions League: 2006–07
- UEFA Super Cup: 2007
- FIFA Club World Cup: 2007

Italy

- Under-21 European Championship: 1992
