= Giovanni Lopez =

Italian footballer and manager

Personal information
- Date of birth: 23 May 1967 (age 59)
- Place of birth: Rome, Italy
- Height: 1.81 m (5 ft 11 in)
- Position: Defender

Senior career*
Years	Team	Apps	(Gls)
1985–1989	Varese	104	(0)
1989–1991	Fidelis Andria	62	(0)
1991–1997	Vicenza	191	(11)
1997–1998	Lazio	27	(0)
1998–2000	Napoli	49	(0)
2000–2003	Torino	2	(0)
2003–2004	Lodigiani	24	(0)
Total		459	(11)

Managerial career
- 2005–2006: Cisco Roma (assistant)
- 2006: Cisco Roma (interim)
- 2006: Cisco Roma (youth)
- 2008–2009: Cisco Roma
- 2010–2012: Lazio (assistant)
- 2013–2014: Vicenza
- 2015–2016: Lucchese
- 2017–2018: Lucchese
- 2018: Viterbese
- 2019: Viterbese
- 2020–2021: Lucchese
- 2021–2022: Pistoiese
- 2023: Viterbese
- 2023–2026: AlbinoLeffe
- 2026: Guidonia Montecelio
- * Club domestic league appearances and goals

Giovanni Lopez (born 23 May 1967) is an Italian professional football coach and a former player, who played as a defender.

== Playing career ==
Whilst at Vicenza, Lopez won the 1996–97 Coppa Italia. He then played for Lazio, Napoli and Torino before retiring after a single season at Rome-based club Lodigiani.

== Coaching career ==
Lopez returned into Cisco Roma, a successor of Lodigiani, in 2006, this time as a head coach, and once again in 2008. On 15 July 2013, he was appointed as the head coach of Vicenza Calcio first team.

Lopez was appointed as the assistant manager of Lazio in 2010 which he worked at until 2012. He led Vicenza to promotion playoffs in Lega Pro Prima Divisione in his first season in charge, and was confirmed after the club was picked to fill a vacancy in the Serie B league. He was successively sacked on 29 October 2014 due to poor results.

On 28 October 2015, Lucchese appointed, that they had appointed Lopez as their new manager. He got fired on 22 February 2016. He was resigned on 28 March 2017.

He was fired by Serie C club Viterbese on 7 November 2018, with the club in 10th place in the table. On 20 August 2019, he was reappointed at the helm of Viterbese. He was fired again on 11 November 2019, following Coppa Italia elimination and a consequent league loss, despite the club being in 6th place in the table.

On 26 October 2020 he was hired once again by Lucchese. He was sacked on 13 April 2021, leaving Lucchese deep in relegation zone by the final part of the season.

On 14 December 2021, he was hired by Pistoiese in Serie C. He was dismissed only a month later, on 25 January 2022, following a club takeover.

On 18 January 2023, Lopez agreed to return to Viterbese for a personal third stint at the club.

After failing to save Viterbese from relegation, on 1 July 2023 Lopez was unveiled as the new head coach of fellow Serie C club AlbinoLeffe.

== Honours ==
=== Player ===
Vicenza

- Coppa Italia: 1996–97

Lazio

- Coppa Italia: 1997–98
- Supercoppa Italiana: 1998
