= 1998 Supercoppa Italiana =

- Event: Supercoppa Italiana
Juventus	Lazio
Serie A	Coppa Italia
1	2
- Date: 29 August 1998
- Venue: Stadio delle Alpi, Turin
- Referee: Roberto Bettin
- Attendance: 16,500

The 1998 Supercoppa Italiana was a match contested by Juventus, the 1997–98 Serie A winner, and Lazio, the 1997–98 Coppa Italia winner. It was the fourth appearance for Juventus (victories in 1995 and 1997), whereas it was Lazio's first appearance, and first victory.

== Match details ==
29 August 1998
20:30 CET

Juventus	1–2	Lazio
Del Piero 87' (pen.)	(Report)	Nedvěd 37'; Conceição 90+4'

Stadio delle Alpi, Turin
Attendance: 16,500
Referee: Roberto Bettin

Juventus	Lazio

JUVENTUS:
GK	1	(Italy) Angelo Peruzzi(c)
RB	15	(Italy) Alessandro Birindelli		(substituted off) 60'
CB	19	(Croatia) Igor Tudor
CB	13	(Italy) Mark Iuliano
LB	17	(Italy) Gianluca Pessotto
CM	20	(Italy) Alessio Tacchinardi	Booked
CM	14	(France) Didier Deschamps		(substituted off) 46'
CM	26	(Netherlands) Edgar Davids		(substituted off) 77'
AM	21	(France) Zinedine Zidane
CF	9	(Italy) Filippo Inzaghi	(yellow card) 64' (yellow-red card)
CF	10	(Italy) Alessandro Del Piero
Substitutes:
GK	12	(Italy) Michelangelo Rampulla
DF	6	(Portugal) Dimas Teixeira		(substituted in) 77'
MF	5	(Italy) Fabio Pecchia
MF	7	(Italy) Angelo Di Livio		(substituted in) 60'
MF	8	(Italy) Antonio Conte
MF	18	(France) Jocelyn Blanchard
FW	11	(Uruguay) Daniel Fonseca		(substituted in) 46'
Manager:
(Italy) Marcello Lippi

LAZIO:
GK	1	(Italy) Luca Marchegiani (c)	Booked
RB	24	(Portugal) Fernando Couto		(substituted off) 77'
CB	6	(Italy) Giovanni López	Booked
CB	11	(Federal Republic of Yugoslavia) Siniša Mihajlović		(substituted off) 84'
LB	3	(Italy) Stefano Lombardi
RM	14	(Portugal) Sérgio Conceição
CM	23	(Italy) Giorgio Venturin	Booked
CM	21	(Spain) Iván de la Peña
LM	18	(Czech Republic) Pavel Nedvěd		(substituted off) 55'
SS	10	(Italy) Roberto Mancini
CF	9	(Chile) Marcelo Salas
Substitutes:
GK	22	(Italy) Marco Ballotta
DF	17	(Italy) Guerino Gottardi		(substituted in) 77'
MF	4	(Italy) Dario Marcolin		(substituted in) 84'
MF	20	(Federal Republic of Yugoslavia) Dejan Stanković	Booked	(substituted in) 55'
MF	26	(Italy) Roberto Baronio
FW	7	(Italy) Roberto Rambaudi
FW	8	(Italy) Igor Protti
Manager:
(Sweden) Sven-Göran Eriksson

MATCH OFFICIALS

- Assistant referees:
- Fourth official:

MATCH RULES

- 90 minutes.
- 30 minutes of extra-time if necessary.
- Penalty shoot-out if scores still level.
- Seven named substitutes
- Maximum of 3 substitutions.

== See also ==
- 1998–99 Juventus FC season
- 1998–99 SS Lazio season

Played between same clubs:

- 2013 Supercoppa Italiana
- 2015 Supercoppa Italiana
- 2017 Supercoppa Italiana
- 2019 Supercoppa Italiana
