= Guerino Gottardi =

Swiss-Italian footballer (born 1970)

Personal information
- Date of birth: 18 December 1970 (age 55)
- Place of birth: Bern, Switzerland
- Height: 1.75 m (5 ft 9 in)
- Position: Defensive midfielder

Senior career*
Years	Team	Apps	(Gls)
1989–1991	Young Boys	38	(1)
1991–1995	Neuchâtel Xamax	119	(8)
1995–2005	Lazio	84	(1)
Total		241	(10)
- * Club domestic league appearances and goals

Guerino Gottardi (born 18 December 1970) is a Swiss former professional footballer who played as a midfielder. He also holds Italian citizenship.

== Career ==
Born in Bern, Gottardi began his career in Switzerland with BSC Young Boys. After joining Italian club Lazio in 1995 from Swiss side Neuchâtel Xamax FCS, Gottardi was often used as a "supersub" and was instrumental in Lazio's 1997–98 Coppa Italia victory. With Lazio losing 2–0 on aggregate, Gottardi came off the bench to win a penalty, and then score before Alessandro Nesta's winner gave Lazio a 3–2 aggregate victory over AC Milan in the final. Gottardi is also remembered for an outstanding performance against cross-city rivals Roma when he scored in the final minute of their second leg Coppa Italia clash, giving Lazio their third consecutive win against their arch rivals in the 1998–99 season.

== Honours ==
Lazio

- Serie A: 1999–2000
- Coppa Italia: 1997–98, 1999–2000, 2003–04
- Supercoppa Italiana: 1998, 2000
- UEFA Cup Winners' Cup: 1998–99
- UEFA Super Cup: 1999
