= Alessandro Grandoni =

Italian footballer and manager (born 1977)

Personal information
- Date of birth: 27 July 1977 (age 49)
- Place of birth: Terni, Italy
- Height: 1.78 m (5 ft 10 in)
- Position: Defender

Team information
- Current team: Chieti (head coach)

Youth career
- Ternana

Senior career*
Years	Team	Apps	(Gls)
1994–1995	Ternana	22	(1)
1995–1998	Lazio	33	(1)
1995–1996	→ Ternana (loan)	30	(0)
1998–2000	Sampdoria	32	(0)
2000	→ Torino (loan)	17	(1)
2000–2004	Sampdoria	106	(0)
2003–2004	Modena	16	(0)
2004–2010	Livorno	145	(2)
2009–2010	→ Gallipoli (loan)	30	(0)
2010	Olympiacos Volos	0	(0)
Total		431	(5)

International career
1997–2000	Italy U-21	19	(0)
1997–2000	Italy U-23	7	(0)

Managerial career
- 2017–2018: Scandicci
- 2018–2019: Savona
- 2019–: Chieti
- * Club domestic league appearances and goals

Alessandro Grandoni (born 27 July 1977) is an Italian football coach and a former defender. He is the head coach of Serie D club Chieti.

== Club career ==
Born in Terni, Italy, Grandoni started his career with hometown club Ternana, then joining Lazio in 1995, and making his Serie A debut one year later. Since then he played at Serie A and Serie B level with a number of teams, including Sampdoria, Torino, Modena, Livorno and Gallipoli. In 2010, he agreed to join Super League Greece club Olympiacos Volos, but he successively left the club a few days later by mutual consent.

== International career ==
Grandoni was also part of the Italy Olympic team that won the gold medal at the 1997 Mediterranean Games football tournament; he also took part at the 2000 Summer Olympics.

== Coaching career ==
After retiring as a player, Grandoni started a career as a coach. He served as youth coach of ACF Fiorentina (Giovanissimi Nazionali) between 2014 and 2016, and successively as youth coach of the Primavera team of Pisa.

In November 2017 he accepted an offer as head coach of Tuscan Serie D club Scandicci, which he led to avoid relegation by the end of the season. He subsequently joined another Serie D club, Savona, in June 2018. He left Savona at the end of the 2018–19 season.

On 17 July 2019, he joined Serie D club Chieti.
