= Sergio Cragnotti =

Italian entrepreneur and author

- Born: 9 January 1940 (age 86); Rome, Kingdom of Italy
- Occupation: businessman
- Height: 1.77 m (5 ft 10 in)

Sergio Cragnotti (Italian pronunciation: [ˈsɛrdʒo kraɲˈɲɔtti]; born 9 January 1940) is an Italian entrepreneur and sports executive.

One of the most high-profile and wealthy business figures in Italy in recent times, Cragnotti is best known for having been president of Lazio. However, his most influential position was as head of food conglomerate Cirio. This company included all Cirio food brands, as well as those of the acquired Del Monte Foods International from the late 1990s. In 1992, Cragnotti bought football team Lazio from previous owner Calleri. In December 1993, the Ontario Securities Commission fined him for insider trading. The Cragnotti family owned 80% of the Cirio group, which in turn owned a 51% stake in the Roman club. In 2002, the Cirio company declared default on its bonds. The default cost about 1.125 million euros to a plethora of small investors, most of them Italian.

Cragnotti presided over perhaps the most successful period in Lazio's recent history, ploughing in record amounts of money which attracted notable athletes such as Pavel Nedvěd, Christian Vieri and Marcelo Salas. His successes included winning both Serie A, along with the final European Cup Winners' Cup, both under the guidance of close friend Sven-Göran Eriksson.

In November 2006, he published his autobiography, titled Un calcio al cuore, co-written with Fabrizio Pennacchia.
