= 1997–98 Coppa Italia =

Tournament details
- Country: Italy
- Dates: 17 Aug 1997 – 29 Apr 1998
- Teams: 48

Final positions
- Champions: Lazio (2nd title)
- Runners-up: Milan

Tournament statistics
- Matches played: 94
- Goals scored: 261 (2.78 per match)
- Top goal scorer(s): Giuseppe Signori; Alen Boksic; Enrico Chiesa (5 goals)

The 1997–98 Coppa Italia, the 51st Coppa Italia was an Italian Football Federation domestic cup competition won by Lazio.

== Preliminary round ==
Team 1	Agg.	Team 2	1st leg	2nd leg
Brescello (C)	5–2	Lucchese (B)	4–1	1–1
Cesena (C)	0–1	Lecce (A)	0–0	0–1
Ancona (B)	2–3	Pescara (B)	2–1	0–2
Chievo (B)	1–2	Castel di Sangro (B)	0–0	1–2
Catania (C)	0–4	Hellas Verona (B)	0–1	0–3
Palermo (C)	1–2	Reggina (B)	1–2	0–0
Savoia (C)	1–3	Perugia (B)	0–0	1–3
Fidelis Andria (B)	5–3	Padova (B)	2–1	3–2
Cosenza (C)	2–3	Foggia (B)	0–0	2–3
Nocerina (C)	3–3 (a)	Cagliari (B)	2–2	1–1
Como (C)	4–5	Torino (B)	4–2	0–3
Treviso (B)	1–4	Reggiana (B)	1–2	0–2
Monza (B)	1–2	Genoa (B)	1–1	0–1
Cremonese (C)	1–5	Ravenna (B)	0–1	1–4
Salernitana (B)	1–2	Bari (A)	1–1	0–1
Carpi (C)	0–1	Venezia (B)	0–1	0–0

== Round of 32 ==
Team 1	Agg.	Team 2	1st leg	2nd leg
Brescello (C)	1–5	Juventus (A)	1–1	0–4
Lecce (A)	3–2	Empoli (A)	2–1	1–1
Pescara (B)	(a) 3–3	Vicenza (A)	0–1	3–2
Castel di Sangro (B)	1–4	Fiorentina (A)	0–2	1–2
Roma (A)	7–4	Hellas Verona (B)	5–3	2–1
Reggina (B)	1–6	Udinese (A)	1–2	0–4
Perugia (B)	4–4 (a)	Napoli (A)	3–2	1–2
Fidelis Andria (B)	2–6	Lazio (A)	0–3	2–3
Foggia (B)	2–4	Internazionale (A)	0–1	2–3
Cagliari (B)	4–4 (a)	Piacenza (A)	3–2	1–2
Torino (B)	3–4	Sampdoria (A)	2–1	1–3
Milan (A)	2–0	Reggiana (B)	0–0	2–0
Genoa (B)	3–4	Atalanta (A)	3–0	0–4
Ravenna (B)	2–7	Bologna (A)	0–5	2–2
Bari (A)	2–1	Brescia (A)	1–0	1–1
Venezia (B)	4–5	Parma (A)	3–2	1–3

== Round of 16 ==
Team 1	Agg.	Team 2	1st leg	2nd leg
Juventus (A)	3–0	Lecce (A)	2–0	1–0
Fiorentina (A)	3–2	Pescara (B)	1–0	2–2
Udinese (A)	3–4	Roma (A)	2–2	1–2
Lazio (A)	4–3	Napoli (A)	4–0	0–3
Piacenza (A)	1–3	Internazionale (A)	0–3	1–0
Milan (A)	5–3	Sampdoria (A)	3–2	2–1
Atalanta (A)	4–4 (p:3-1)	Bologna (A)	3–1	1–3
Parma (A)	3–1	Bari (A)	2–1	1–0

p=after penalty shoot-out

== Quarter-finals ==
Team 1	Agg.	Team 2	1st leg	2nd leg
Fiorentina	2–2	Juventus	2–2	0–0
Lazio	6–2	Roma	4–1	2–1
Milan	5–1	Internazionale	5–0	0–1
Parma	2–1	Atalanta	1–0	1–1

== Semi-finals ==
Team 1	Agg.	Team 2	1st leg	2nd leg
Juventus	2–3	Lazio	0–1	2–2
Milan	(a) 2–2	Parma	0–0	2–2

== Final ==
=== First leg ===
8 April 1998
21:00

Milan	1–0	Lazio
Weah 90'

San Siro, Milan
Attendance: 63,564
Referee: Livio Bazzoli

=== Second leg ===
29 April 1998
21:00

Lazio	3–1	Milan
Gottardi 56'; Jugović 59' (pen.); Nesta 66'		Albertini 47'

Stadio Olimpico, Rome
Attendance: 64,189
Referee: Florenzo Treossi

Lazio win 3–2 on aggregate.

== Top goalscorers ==
Rank	Player	Club	Goals
1	(Italy) Giuseppe Signori	Lazio	5
1	(Croatia) Alen Bokšić	Lazio	5
1	(Italy) Enrico Chiesa	Parma	5
4	(Italy) Alfredo Aglietti	Hellas Verona	4
4	(Italy) Sandro Tovalieri	Sampdoria	4
4	(Italy) Marco Ferrante	Torino	4
