= 1999–2000 Piacenza Calcio season =

Piacenza
1999–2000 season
- Manager: büki tk Luigi Simoni; Maurizio Braghin; Daniele Bernazzani
- Serie A: 18th
- Coppa Italia: Round of 16
- Top goalscorer: Arturo Di Napoli (4)

Piacenza Calcio crashed out of Serie A, following a dismal season. With ex-Inter coach Luigi Simoni at the helm, the club was looking to climb into midtable in Serie A, but the absence of Simone Inzaghi and the ageing of several key players rendered disastrous form, and Simoni was soon sacked. In the end, Piacenza finished rock bottom of the table and their five-year stint in the top flight was ended.

== Squad ==
=== Goalkeepers ===
- (Italy) Michele Nicoletti
- (Italy) Flavio Roma
- (Italy) Matteo Giovagnoli
- (Italy) Davide Bagnacani

=== Defenders ===
- (Italy) Giordano Caini
- (Italy) Daniele Delli Carri
- (Italy) Gianluca Lamacchi
- (Italy) Alessandro Lucarelli
- (Italy) Andrea Maccagni
- (Italy) Gian Paolo Manighetti
- (Italy) Cleto Polonia
- (Italy) Stefano Sacchetti
- (Italy) Matteo Savioni
- (Italy) Pietro Vierchowod

=== Midfielders ===
- (Italy) Renato Buso
- (Italy) Paolo Cristallini
- (Italy) Carmine Gautieri
- (Italy) Alessandro Mazzola
- (Italy) Stefano Morrone
- (Italy) Gianpietro Piovani
- (Italy) Francesco Statuto
- (Italy) Giovanni Stroppa
- (Italy) Andrea Tagliaferri
- (Italy) Francesco Zitolo

=== Attackers ===
- (Italy) Arturo Di Napoli
- (Italy) Davide Dionigi
- (Italy) Luigi Forlini
- (Italy) Alberto Gilardino
- (Italy) Massimo Rastelli
- (Italy) Ruggiero Rizzitelli
- (Italy) Francesco Zerbini

== Serie A ==
Pos	Team	Pld	W	D	L	GF	GA	GD	Pts	Qualification or relegation
14	Bari	34	10	9	15	34	48	−14	39	
15	Torino (R)	34	8	12	14	35	47	−12	36	Relegation to Serie B
16	Venezia (R)	34	6	8	20	30	60	−30	26	Relegation to Serie B
17	Cagliari (R)	34	3	13	18	29	54	−25	22	Relegation to Serie B
18	Piacenza (R)	34	4	9	21	19	45	−26	21	Relegation to Serie B

Source: Serie A, RSSSF.com, Soccerway
Rules for classification: 1) Points; 2) Head-to-head points; 3) Head-to-head goal difference; 4) Goal difference; 5) Goals scored; 6) Draw. (Note: Head-to-head record is used only after all the matches between the teams in question have been played).
(R) Relegated

=== Matches ===
1	Piacenza	1–1	Roma
	Stroppa 82'		Totti 14' (pen.)

2	Udinese	3–0	Piacenza
	Poggi 9' (pen.); Locatelli 74'; Muzzi 81'

3	Piacenza	1–1	Lecce
	Dionigi 4'		C. Lucarelli 41'

4	Reggina	1–0	Piacenza
	Cirillo 86'

5	Inter	2–1	Piacenza
	Panucci 14'; Ronaldo 69'		Dionigi 81' (pen.)

6	Piacenza	0–0	Bologna

7	Piacenza	2–0	Fiorentina
	Cristallini 83'; Di Napoli 89' (pen.)

8	Juventus	1–0	Piacenza
	Del Piero 76' (pen.)

9	Piacenza	1–2	Parma
	Di Napoli 45' (pen.)		Crespo 21'; Boghossian 31'

10	Venezia	0–0	Piacenza

11	Piacenza	1–0	Verona
	Di Napoli 42' (pen.)

12	Bari	3–2	Piacenza
	Marcolini 40'; Neqrouz 53, 72'		Rizzitelli 32'; Dionigi 64'

13	Piacenza	0–0	Perugia

14	Lazio	2–0	Piacenza
	Salas 9'; Mihajlović 88'

15	Piacenza	0–1	Milan
			Bierhoff 33'

16	Cagliari	3–0	Piacenza
	Luís Oliveira 49'; Mboma 89, 90'

17	Piacenza	0–2	Torino
			Ferrante 83'; Pecchia 89'

18	Roma	2–1	Piacenza
	Di Francesco 47'; Totti 75'		Piovani 45'

19	Piacenza	0–1	Udinese
			Muzzi 56'

20	Lecce	0–1	Piacenza
			Rastelli 49'

21	Piacenza	0–0	Reggina

22	Piacenza	1–3	Inter
	Delli Carri 69'		Blanc 20, 78'; Vieri 88'

23	Bologna	0–0	Piacenza

24	Fiorentina	2–1	Piacenza
	Balbo 58'; Rui Costa 81'		Di Napoli 89'

25	Piacenza	0–2	Juventus
			F. Inzaghi 70, 76'

26	Parma	1–0	Piacenza
	Crespo 63' (pen.)

27	Piacenza	2–2	Venezia
	Gilardino 2'; Piovani 82'		Valtolina 5'; Berg 12'

28	Verona	1–0	Piacenza
	Brocchi 68'

29	Piacenza	2–1	Bari
	Gilardino 27'; Gautieri 60'		D. Andersson 66'

30	Perugia	2–0	Piacenza
	Materazzi 15'; Rapaić 74'

31	Piacenza	0–2	Lazio
			Simeone 57'; Verón 65'

32	Milan	1–0	Piacenza
	Ambrosini 15'

33	Piacenza	1–1	Cagliari
	Rastelli 13'		Suazo 8'

34	Torino	2–1	Piacenza
	Ferrante 17', 29' (pen.)		Gilardino 15'

=== Top scorers ===
- (Italy) Arturo Di Napoli 4 (3)
- (Italy) Alberto Gilardino 3
- (Italy) Davide Dionigi 3 (1)
- (Italy) Gianpietro Piovani 2
- (Italy) Massimo Rastelli 2

== Sources ==
- RSSSF - Italy 1999/2000
