= 1998–99 Piacenza Calcio season =

Piacenza
1998–99 season
- Manager: Giuseppe Materazzi
- Serie A: 12th
- Coppa Italia: Round of 32
- Top goalscorer: Simone Inzaghi (15)

Piacenza Calcio had their most successful season ever, with 41 points in 34 games, albeit just three points above the relegation zone. Much thanks to 15 times goal scorer Simone Inzaghi, Piacenza was able to secure a fifth consecutive season in the top flight. The remarkable finish with seven wins out of the last eleven, was key in determining the survival.

== Squad ==
=== Goalkeepers ===
- (Italy) Valerio Fiori
- (Italy) Sergio Marcon
- (Italy) Michele Nicoletti

=== Defenders ===
- (Italy) Mauro Barberini
- (Italy) Giordano Caini
- (Italy) Daniele Cozzi
- (Italy) Daniele Delli Carri
- (Italy) Gianluca Lamacchi
- (Italy) Alessandro Lucarelli
- (Italy) Gian Paolo Manighetti
- (Italy) Stefano Sacchetti
- (Italy) Pietro Vierchowod

=== Midfielders ===
- (Italy) Renato Buso
- (Italy) Paolo Cristallini
- (Italy) Alessandro Mazzola
- (Italy) Daniele Moretti
- (Italy) Gianpietro Piovani
- (Italy) Adolfo Speranza
- (Italy) Francesco Statuto
- (Italy) Giovanni Stroppa
- (Italy) Stefano Turi
- (Italy) Francesco Varrenti

=== Attackers ===
- (Italy) Davide Dionigi
- (Italy) Simone Inzaghi
- (Italy) Massimo Rastelli
- (Italy) Ruggiero Rizzitelli
- (Italy) Alberto Gilardino

== Serie A ==
Pos	Team	Pld	W	D	L	GF	GA	GD	Pts	Qualification or relegation
10	Bari	34	9	15	10	39	44	−5	42 (Note: BAR 1–0 VEN, VEN 2–1 BAR)	
11	Venezia	34	11	9	14	38	45	−7	42	
12	Piacenza	34	11	8	15	48	49	−1	41 (Note: CAG 3–2 PIA, PIA 2–0 CAG)	
13	Cagliari	34	11	8	15	49	50	−1	41	
14	Perugia (Note: Perugia gained entry to the 1999 UEFA Intertoto Cup Second round after the renounce of several teams.)	34	11	6	17	43	61	−18	39	Qualification to Intertoto Cup second round

Source: Serie A, RSSSF.com, Soccerway
Rules for classification: 1) Points; 2) Head-to-head points; 3) Head-to-head goal difference; 4) Goal difference; 5) Goals scored; 6) Draw. (Note: Head-to-head record is used only after all the matches between the teams in question have been played).

=== Matches ===
13 September 1998 1	Piacenza	1–1	Lazio	Piacenza
	S. Inzaghi 87'	Report	Stanković 29'	Stadium: Stadio Leonardo Garilli; Referee: Stefano Farina

20 September 1998 2	Internazionale	1–0	Piacenza	Milan
	Ronaldo 66' (pen.)	Report		Stadium: San Siro; Referee: Emilio Pellegrino

27 September 1998 3	Piacenza	2–0	Vicenza	Piacenza
	Polonia 45+1'; Dionigi 78' (pen.)	Report		Stadium: Stadio Leonardo Garilli; Referee: Roberto Bettin

4 October 1998 4	Juventus	1–0	Piacenza	Turin
	Inzaghi 8'	Report		Stadium: Stadio delle Alpi; Referee: Emilio Pellegrino

18 October 1998 5	Piacenza	4–1	Sampdoria	Piacenza
	Vierchowod 3'; S. Inzaghi 42' (pen.); Manighetti 72'; Rastelli 86'	Report	Ortega 28' (pen.)	Stadium: Stadio Leonardo Garilli; Referee: Pierluigi Collina

25 October 1998 6	Bologna	3–1	Piacenza	Bologna
	Nervo 51'; K. Andersson 55', 78'	Report	Mangone 58' (o.g.)	Stadium: Stadio Renato Dall'Ara; Referee: Pasquale Rodomonti P.

1 November 1998 7	Piacenza	1–1	Milan	Piacenza
	S. Inzaghi 44'	Report	Ganz 90+2'	Stadium: Stadio Leonardo Garilli; Referee: Emilio Pellegrino

8 November 1998 8	Cagliari	3–2	Piacenza	Cagliari
	Muzzi 21', 61'; Kallon 54'	Report	Buso 37'; S. Inzaghi 57'	Stadium: Stadio Sant'Elia; Referee: Livio Bazzoli

15 November 1998 9	Piacenza	4–2	Fiorentina	Piacenza
	Rastelli 12'; S. Inzaghi 29' (pen.); Cristallini 59'; Piovani 90+4'	Report	Rui Costa 23' (pen.); Edmundo 40' (pen.)	Stadium: Stadio Leonardo Garilli; Referee: Salvatore Racalbuto

22 November 1998 10	Udinese	1–0	Piacenza	Udine
	Poggi 40'	Report		Stadium: Stadio Friuli; Referee: Roberto Bettin

29 November 1998 11	Perugia	2–0	Piacenza	Perugia
	Nakata 20', 50'	Report		Stadium: Stadio Renato Curi; Referee: Daniele Tombolini

6 December 1998 12	Piacenza	0–0	Empoli	Piacenza
		Report		Stadium: Stadio Leonardo Garilli; Referee: Graziano Cesari

13 December 1998 13	Venezia	0–0	Piacenza	Venice
		Report		Stadium: Stadio Pier Luigi Penzo; Referee: Fiorenzo Treossi

20 December 1998 14	Piacenza	3–2	Bari	Piacenza
	Piovani 20'; Stroppa 42'; Rastelli 89'	Report	Masinga 37'; Innocenti 90+3'	Stadium: Stadio Leonardo Garilli; Referee: Pasquale Rodomonti P.

6 January 1999 15	Roma	2–2	Piacenza	Rome
	Di Francesco 27'; Tommasi 53'	Report	Stroppa 38'; Dal Moro 48' (o.g.)	Stadium: Stadio Olimpico; Referee: Cosimo Bolognino

10 January 1999 16	Piacenza	3–6	Parma	Piacenza
	S. Inzaghi 17', 75' (pen.); Cristallini 58'	Report	Cristallini 13' (o.g.); Balbo 52', 63', 65'; Fuser 67'; Crespo 83'	Stadium: Stadio Leonardo Garilli; Referee: Fiorenzo Treossi

17 January 1999 17	Salernitana	1–1	Piacenza	Salerno
	Fresi 20'	Report	Dionigi 58'	Stadium: Stadio Arechi; Referee: Graziano Cesari

24 January 1999 18	Lazio	4–1	Piacenza	Rome
	Mihajlović 10'; Salas 59'; Stanković 78'; Mancini 81'	Report	Buso 57'	Stadium: Stadio Olimpico; Referee: Pierluigi Collina

31 January 1999 19	Piacenza	0–0	Internazionale	Piacenza
		Report		Stadium: Stadio Leonardo Garilli; Referee: Domenico Messina

7 February 1999 20	Vicenza	1–0	Piacenza	Vicenza
	Ambrosetti 10'	Report		Stadium: Stadio Romeo Menti; Referee: Roberto Bettin

14 February 1999 21	Piacenza	0–2	Juventus	Piacenza
		Report	Manighetti 45+1' (o.g.); Birindelli 90+5'	Stadium: Stadio Leonardo Garilli; Referee: Domenico Messina

21 February 1999 22	Sampdoria	3–2	Piacenza	Genoa
	Montella 23' (pen.); Laigle 34'; Ortega 57'	Report	Piovani 70'; Dionigi 82' (pen.)	Stadium: Stadio Luigi Ferraris; Referee: Massimo De Santis

27 February 1999 23	Piacenza	5–0	Bologna	Piacenza
	S. Inzaghi 20' (pen.), 38' (pen.), 86'; Rastelli 44'; Piovani 84' (pen.)	Report		Stadium: Stadio Leonardo Garilli; Referee: Massimo De Santis

7 March 1999 24	Milan	1–0	Piacenza	Milan
	Bierhoff 43'	Report		Stadium: San Siro; Referee: Graziano Cesari

14 March 1999 25	Piacenza	2–0	Cagliari	Piacenza
	S. Inzaghi 9' (pen.); Vierchowod 81'	Report		Stadium: Stadio Leonardo Garilli; Referee: Graziano Cesari

21 March 1999 26	Fiorentina	2–1	Piacenza	Florence
	Batistuta 6'; C. Esposito 90+1'	Report	S. Inzaghi 71' (pen.)	Stadium: Stadio Artemio Franchi; Referee: Pierluigi Collina

3 April 1999 27	Piacenza	4–3	Udinese	Piacenza
	Piovani 13'; S. Inzaghi 44' (pen.); Vierchowod 62'; Cristallini 71'	Report	Jørgensen 5'; Bachini 9'; Pierini 36'	Stadium: Stadio Leonardo Garilli; Referee: Roberto Bettin

11 April 1999 28	Piacenza	2–0	Perugia	Piacenza
	Lamacchi 90'; S. Inzaghi 90+6'	Report		Stadium: Stadio Leonardo Garilli; Referee: Stefano Farina

18 April 1999 29	Empoli	1–2	Piacenza	Empoli
	Fusco 68'	Report	Mazzola 69'; Dionigi 88'	Stadium: Stadio Carlo Castellani; Referee: Salvatore Racalbuto

25 April 1999 30	Piacenza	0–1	Venezia	Piacenza
		Report	Maniero 5'	Stadium: Stadio Leonardo Garilli; Referee: Massimo De Santis

2 May 1999 31	Bari	3–1	Piacenza	Bari
	De Ascentis 5'; Masinga 84'; Giorgetti 90' (pen.)	Report	Dionigi 10'	Stadium: Stadio San Nicola; Referee: Domenico Messina

9 May 1999 32	Piacenza	2–0	Roma	Piacenza
	Rastelli 32'; Statuto 81'	Report		Stadium: Stadio Leonardo Garilli; Referee: Cosimo Bolognino

16 May 1999 33	Parma	0–1	Piacenza	Parma
		Report	S. Inzaghi 31'	Stadium: Stadio Ennio Tardini; Referee: Piero Ceccarini

23 May 1999 34	Piacenza	1–1	Salernitana	Piacenza
	Vierchowod 53'	Report	Fresi 64' (pen.)	Stadium: Stadio Leonardo Garilli; Referee: Roberto Bettin

=== Top Scorers ===
- (Italy) Simone Inzaghi 15 (8)
- (Italy) Davide Dionigi 5 (1)
- (Italy) Gianpietro Piovani 5 (1)
- (Italy) Massimo Rastelli 4
- (Italy) Pietro Vierchowod 3

== Sources ==
- RSSSF - Italy Championship 1998/99
