= 1997–98 Piacenza Calcio season =

Piacenza
1997–98 season
- Manager: Vincenzo Guerini
- Serie A: 12th
- Coppa Italia: Round of 16
- Top goalscorer: Davide Dionigi, Roberto Murgita, Gianpietro Piovani (5)
Home colours	Away colours	Third colours

Piacenza Calcio recorded their best ever finish in the top echelon of Italian football, finishing 12th in Serie A, but just two points above the relegation zone. This was in spite of key players Pasquale Luiso (Vicenza) and Eusebio Di Francesco (Roma) leaving the club before the season began.

== Squad ==
=== Goalkeepers ===
- (Italy) Matteo Sereni
- (Italy) Sergio Marcon

=== Defenders ===
- (Italy) Mirko Conte
- (Italy) Daniele Delli Carri
- (Italy) Marco Rossi
- (Italy) Cleto Polonia
- (Italy) Stefano Sacchetti
- (Italy) Pietro Vierchowod
- (Italy) Roberto Bordin
- (Italy) Daniele Cozzi
- (Italy) Andrea Tagliaferri

=== Midfielders ===
- (Italy) Renato Buso
- (Italy) Marco Piovanelli
- (Italy) Alessandro Mazzola
- (Italy) Giuseppe Scienza
- (Italy) Giovanni Stroppa
- (Italy) Aladino Valoti
- (Italy) Fabian Valtolina
- (Italy) Luca Matteassi
- (Italy) Paolo Tramezzani
- (Italy) Gianpietro Piovani

=== Attackers ===
- (Italy) Simone Inzaghi
- (Italy) Davide Dionigi
- (Italy) Roberto Murgita
- (Italy) Massimo Rastelli
- (Italy) Francesco Zerbini
- (Italy) Gabriele Ballotta

== Serie A ==
Pos	Team	Pld	W	D	L	GF	GA	GD	Pts
10	Milan	34	11	11	12	37	43	−6	44
11	Bari	34	10	8	16	30	45	−15	38
12	Piacenza	34	7	16	11	29	38	−9	37
13	Empoli	34	10	7	17	50	58	−8	37
14	Vicenza	34	9	9	16	36	61	−25	36

Source: 1997–98 Serie A, RSSSF.com, Soccerway
Rules for classification: 1) Points; 2) Head-to-head points; 3) Head-to-head goal difference; 4) Goal difference; 5) Goals scored; 6) Draw. (Note: Head-to-head record is used only after all the matches between the teams in question have been played).

=== Matches ===
1	Piacenza	1–1	Milan
	Delli Carri 64'		Delli Carri 29' (o.g.)

2	Vicenza	3–2	Piacenza
	Di Carlo 32' (pen.); Luiso 51'; Di Napoli 60'		Tramezzani 29'; Valtolina 69'

3	Piacenza	1–3	Parma
	Scienza 45'		Crespo 1, 63'; Sensini 29'

4	Brescia	2–0	Piacenza
	Sabău 40'; Hübner 48'

5	Piacenza	0–0	Bologna

6	Sampdoria	3–1	Piacenza
	Tovalieri 44, 74'; Montella 52' (pen.)		Dionigi 47' (pen.)

7	Piacenza	0–0	Fiorentina

8	Udinese	2–0	Piacenza
	Poggi 45'; Bierhoff 86' (pen.)

9	Piacenza	0–0	Lazio

10	Empoli	2–3	Piacenza
	C. Esposito 14'; Bettella 43'		Dionigi 7, 38'; Buso 88'

11	Piacenza	1–0	Napoli
	Rastelli 87'

12	Piacenza	1–1	Juventus
	Piovani 80'		Fonseca 78'

13	Bari	0–0	Piacenza

14	Atalanta	2–2	Piacenza
	Sgrò 68'; Carrera 90 + 1'		Englaro 88' (o.g.); Vierchowod 90 + 5'

15	Piacenza	0–1	Inter
			Moriero 70'

16	Roma	1–1	Piacenza
	Aldair 6'		Rastelli 85'

17	Piacenza	1–0	Lecce
	Scienza 78'

18	Milan	1–0	Piacenza
	Maniero 90'

19	Piacenza	1–1	Vicenza
	Murgita 57'		Zauli 47'

20	Parma	1–1	Piacenza
	Crespo 13' (pen.)		Buso 28'

21	Piacenza	0–0	Brescia

22	Bologna	3–0	Piacenza
	K. Andersson 34, 51'; R. Baggio 87'

23	Piacenza	1–0	Sampdoria
	Murgita 47'

24	Fiorentina	1–1	Piacenza
	Morfeo 71' (pen.)		Dionigi 28' (pen.)

25	Piacenza	0–2	Udinese
			Bierhoff 18' (pen.); Poggi 27'

26	Lazio	0–0	Piacenza

27	Piacenza	0–0	Empoli

28	Napoli	1–2	Piacenza
	Bellucci 51'		Scienza 33'; Dionigi 84' (pen.)

29	Juventus	2–0	Piacenza
	Zidane 53'; Del Piero 81'

30	Piacenza	0–1	Bari
			Masinga 25'

31	Piacenza	3–0	Atalanta
	Piovani 2', 54' (pen.); Murgita 64'

32	Inter	0–0	Piacenza

33	Piacenza	3–3	Roma
	Piovani 46' (pen.); Murgita 57'; Valtolina 90 + 4'		Di Francesco 47'; Totti 52' (pen.); Paulo Sérgio 86'

34	Lecce	1–3	Piacenza
	Palmieri 90 + 2' (pen.)		Murgita 40'; Vierchowod 50'; Piovani 71' (pen.)

=== Top scorers ===
- (Italy) Davide Dionigi 5 (2)
- (Italy) Roberto Murgita 5
- (Italy) Gianpietro Piovani 5 (2)
- (Italy) Giuseppe Scienza 3

== Sources ==
- RSSSF - Italy Championship 1997/98
