= 1997–98 Vicenza Calcio season =

Vicenza Calcio
1997–98 season
- Owner: ENIC Group
- President: Virgilio Marzot (until 23 October 1997); Paolo Scaroni
- Manager: Francesco Guidolin
- Stadium: Romeo Menti
- Serie A: 14th
- Coppa Italia: Round of 32
- Supercoppa Italiana: Runners-up
- Cup Winners' Cup: Semi-finals
Home colours	Away colours	Third colours

During the 1997–98 season Vicenza competed in Serie A, Coppa Italia and UEFA Cup Winners' Cup.

== Season summary ==
Vicenza reached the semi-finals of the Cup Winners' Cup. They only avoided relegation by one point.

== Kit ==
Vicenza's kit was manufactured by Lotto and sponsored by Pal Zileri.

== Squad ==
Squad at end of season

Note: Flags indicate national team as defined under FIFA eligibility rules; some limited exceptions apply. Players may hold more than one non-FIFA nationality.

No.	Pos.	Nation	Player
2	DF	ITA	Paolo Pasqualin
3	DF	ITA	Francesco Coco
4	MF	ITA	Domenico Di Carlo
5	DF	ITA	Davide Belotti
6	MF	ITA	Roberto Baronio
7	MF	ITA	Marco Schenardi
8	DF	URU	Gustavo Méndez
9	FW	ITA	Pasquale Luiso
10	MF	ITA	Fabio Viviani
12	GK	ITA	Roberto Verdi
13	MF	ITA	Fabio Firmani
14	MF	ITA	Lamberto Zauli
15	MF	ITA	Massimo Ambrosini

No.	Pos.	Nation	Player
16	DF	ITA	Massimo Beghetto
17	DF	ITA	Sebastiano Sapienza
18	DF	ITA	Giacomo Dicara
19	FW	URU	Marcelo Otero
20	FW	ITA	Arturo Di Napoli
21	DF	ITA	Lorenzo Stovini
22	GK	ITA	Pierluigi Brivio
23	MF	ITA	Gabriele Ambrosetti
24	DF	URU	Ricardo Canals
26	GK	ITA	Davide Falcioni
27	MF	ITA	Riccardo Maspero
28	DF	ITA	Mirko Conte

=== Transfers ===
In
Pos.	Name	from	Type
FW	Pasquale Luiso	Piacenza	
DF	Ricardo Canals	CD Logroñés	
DF	Francesco Coco	AC Milan	loan
MF	Massimo Ambrosini	AC Milan	loan
DF	Giacomo Dicara	Perugia	
DF	Lorenzo Stovini	AS Roma	
MF	Roberto Baronio	SS Lazio	loan
MF	Marco Schenardi	Bologna FC	
MF	Lamberto Zauli	Ravenna	
FW	Arturo Di Napoli	Internazionale	

Out
Pos.	Name	To	Type
MF	Giampiero Maini	AC Milan	
DF	Luigi Sartor	Internazionale	
DF	Giovanni Lopez	SS Lazio	
DF	Gilberto D'Ignazio	Udinese	
MF	Daniele Amerini	Hellas Verona	
MF	Maurizio Rossi	US Lecce	
MF	Pierre Wome	Lucchese	loan
FW	Roberto Murgita	Piacenza	
MF	Massimo Dalle Nogare	Giorgione	
FW	Giovanni Cornacchini	Padova	
MF	Giuliano Gentilini	Padova	
FW	Marco Cunico	Sandonà	

==== Winter ====
In
Pos.	Name	from	Type
FW	Goran Tomic	Sebenico	
GK	Davide Falcioni	Treviso	
MF	Riccardo Maspero	US Lecce	
DF	Mirko Conte	SSC Napoli	

Out
Pos.	Name	To	Type
FW	Alessandro Iannuzzi	Lecce	
GK	Luca Mondini	Treviso	
FW	Goran Tomic	AEK Athens	

== Competitions ==
=== Serie A ===
==== League table ====
Pos	Team	Pld	W	D	L	GF	GA	GD	Pts	Qualification or relegation
12	Piacenza	34	7	16	11	29	38	−9	37	
13	Empoli	34	10	7	17	50	58	−8	37	
14	Vicenza	34	9	9	16	36	61	−25	36	
15	Brescia (R)	34	9	8	17	45	63	−18	35	Relegation to Serie B
16	Atalanta (R)	34	7	11	16	25	48	−23	32	Relegation to Serie B

Source: 1997–98 Serie A, RSSSF.com, Soccerway
Rules for classification: 1) Points; 2) Head-to-head points; 3) Head-to-head goal difference; 4) Goal difference; 5) Goals scored; 6) Draw. (Note: Head-to-head record is used only after all the matches between the teams in question have been played).
(R) Relegated

==== Results by round ====
Round	1	2	3	4	5	6	7	8	9	10	11	12	13	14	15	16	17	18	19	20	21	22	23	24	25	26	27	28	29	30	31	32	33	34
Ground	A	H	A	H	A	H	A	H	A	H	H	A	H	A	H	A	H	H	A	H	A	H	A	H	A	H	A	A	H	A	H	A	H	A
Result	L	W	D	W	D	L	W	W	D	L	W	L	L	L	L	W	L	D	D	D	L	L	W	W	L	D	L	L	D	W	D	D	L	L
Position	11	9	8	6	6	9	5	5	6	6	6	7	10	10	10	10	11	10	10	10	10	11	10	10	11	11	11	11	11	11	11	11	13	14

Source: Competitive matches
A = Away; H = Home; W = Win; D = Draw; L = Loss; P = Postponed; = Leader, 1998–99 UEFA Champions League Group stage; = 1998–99 UEFA Champions League Second Qualifying round; = 1998–99 UEFA Cup First round; = Qualification to Intertoto Cup; = 1998–99 Serie B

==== Matches ====
31 August 1997 1	Sampdoria	2–1	Vicenza	Genoa
	Boghossian 10'; Tovalieri 85'		Di Napoli 53'	Stadium: Luigi Ferraris; Referee: Fiorenzo Treossi

14 September 1997 2	Vicenza	3–2	Piacenza	Vicenza
	Di Carlo 32'pen Luiso 51'; Di Napoli 60'		Tramezzani 29'pen Valtolina 69'	Stadium: Romeo Menti

21 September 1997 3	Vicenza	1–1	Napoli	Vicenza
	Di Napoli 17'		Turrini 18'	Stadium: Romeo Menti

28 September 1997 4	Milan	0–1	Vicenza	Milan
		Report	45' Di Napoli	Stadium: Stadio Giuseppe Meazza; Attendance: 53.672; Referee: Pierluigi Collina

5 October 1997 5	Vicenza	0–0	Parma	Vicenza
15:30		Report		Stadium: Romeo Menti; Attendance: 16.806; Referee: Pasquale Rodomonti

19 October 1997 6	Brescia	4–0	Vicenza	Brescia
15:30	Neri 45+2' (pen.), 69'; Hübner 65'; Pirlo 79'	Report		Stadium: Stadio Mario Rigamonti; Attendance: 13 550; Referee: Emilio Pellegrino

2 November 1997 7	Atalanta	1–3	Vicenza	Bergamo
14:30	Sgro 27'	Report	43', 65' Ambrosetti; 68' (o.g.) Englaro	Stadium: Stadio Atleti Azzurri d'Italia; Attendance: 16 741; Referee: Daniele Tombolini

9 November 1997 8	Vicenza	3–2	Bologna	Vicenza
14:30	Di Carlo 9' (pen.); Otero 64'; Schenardi 85'	Report	35' Marocchi; 56' Baggio	Stadium: Romeo Menti; Attendance: 15.213; Referee: Pier Paolo Rossi

23 November 1997 9	Roma	2–2	Vicenza	Rome
	Balbo 28'; Paulo Sérgio 44'	Report	1' Luiso; 45+2' Ambrosetti	Stadium: Stadio Olimpico; Attendance: 48 552; Referee: Graziano Cesari

30 November 1997 10	Vicenza	1–3	Internazionale	Vicenza
14:30	Ambrosini 59'	Report	33', 39' Simeone; 68' Ronaldo	Stadium: Romeo Menti; Attendance: 19 612; Referee: Alfredo Trentalange

7 December 1997 11	Lecce	0–1	Vicenza	Lecce
14:30		Report	81' Luiso	Stadium: Stadio Via del Mare; Attendance: 13.966; Referee: Massimo De Santis

14 December 1997 12	Vicenza	1–5	Fiorentina	Vicenza
20:30	Di Napoli 81'	Report	7', 54' Luis Oliveira; 43' Batistuta; 59' Serena; 65'Schwarz	Stadium: Romeo Menti; Attendance: 15 944; Referee: Gennaro Borriello

21 December 1997 13	Lazio	4–0	Vicenza	Rome
14:30	Casiraghi 7'; Fuser 63'; Venturin 70'; Boksic 91'	Report		Stadium: Stadio Olimpico; Attendance: 37 201; Referee: Cosimo Bolognino

4 January 1998 14	Vicenza	1–2	Bari	Vicenza
14:30	Luiso 28'	Report	40' Masinga; 65' Zambrotta	Stadium: Romeo Menti; Attendance: 15.729; Referee: Emilio Pellegrino

11 January 1998 15	Juventus	2–0	Vicenza	Turin
14:30	Del Piero 27' (pen.); Ferrara 76'	Report		Stadium: Stadio Delle Alpi; Attendance: 42 036; Referee: Daniele Tombolini

18 January 1998 16	Vicenza	1–0	Empoli	Vicenza
14:30	Luiso 89'}	Report		Stadium: Romeo Menti; Attendance: 18 955; Referee: Salvatore Racalbuto

25 January 1998 17	Udinese	3–0	Vicenza	Udine
14:30	Bierhoff 20', 37'; Locatelli 44'	Report		Stadium: Stadio Friuli; Attendance: 23 096; Referee: Massimo De Santis

1 February 1998 18	Vicenza	1–1	Sampdoria	Vicenza
	Zauli 27'	Report	18' Veron	Stadium: Romeo Menti; Attendance: 15 518; Referee: Robert Boggi

8 February 1998 19	Piacenza	1–1	Vicenza	Piacenza
14:30	Murgita 57'	Report	Zauli 47'	Stadium: Stadio Leonardo Garilli; Attendance: 15 518; Referee: Pasquale Rodomonti

11 February 1998 20	Napoli	2–0	Vicenza	Naples
20:30	Turrini 43' (pen.); Stojak 47'	Report		Stadium: Stadio San Paolo; Attendance: 31 085; Referee: Stefano Braschi

15 February 1998 21	Vicenza	1–4	Milan	Vicenza
15:00	Otero 54'	Report	3', 82' Kluivert; 8' Ganz; 73' Maniero	Stadium: Romeo Menti; Attendance: 16 141; Referee: Pierluigi Pairetto

22 February 1998 22	Parma	2–1	Vicenza	Parma
	Stanic 63'; Chiesa 72'pen	Report	Ambrosetti 59'	Stadium: Ennio Tardini; Attendance: 19.537; Referee: Emilio Pellegrino

1 March 1998 23	Vicenza	2–1	Brescia	Vicenza
15:00	Dicara 12'; Dicara 85'	Report	71' A. Filippini	Stadium: Romeo Menti; Attendance: 16 139; Referee: Piero Ceccarini

8 March 1998 24	Vicenza	1–0	Atalanta	Vicenza
15:00	Di Napoli 83'	Report		Stadium: Romeo Menti; Attendance: 17 548; Referee: Livio Bazzoli

14 March 1998 25	Bologna	3–1	Vicenza	Bologna
15:00	Andersson 18', 45+1'; Kolyvanov 39'	Report	Zauli 33'	Stadium: Stadio Renato Dall'Ara; Attendance: 32 076; Referee: Stefano Farina

22 March 1998 26	Vicenza	1–1	Roma	Vicenza
15:00	Luiso 24'	Report	12' Balbo	Stadium: Romeo Menti; Attendance: 16.904; Referee: Pierluigi Collina

28 March 1998 27	Internazionale	2–1	Vicenza	Milan
15:00	Simeone 67'; Ronaldo 95'pen	Report	Zauli 82'	Stadium: Stadio Giuseppe Meazza; Attendance: 64 674; Referee: Domenico Messina

5 April 1998 28	Vicenza	1–3	Lecce	Vicenza
16:00	Luiso 88'	Report	29' Palmieri; 55'Palmieri; 95' Piangerelli	Stadium: Romeo Menti; Attendance: 17 857; Referee: Emilio Pellegrino

11 April 1998 29	Fiorentina	1–1	Vicenza	Florence
	Luis Oliveira 33'	Report	Mendez 11'	Stadium: Stadio Artemio Franchi; Attendance: 33.342; Referee: Livio Bazzoli

19 April 1998 30	Vicenza	2–1	Lazio	Vicenza
16:00	Zauli 27'; Luiso 54'	Report	48' Mancini	Stadium: Romeo Menti; Attendance: 17 622; Referee: Stefano Braschi

26 April 1998 31	Bari	0–0	Vicenza	Bari
16:00		Report		Stadium: Stadio San Nicola; Attendance: 17.942; Referee: Robert Boggi

3 May 1998 32	Vicenza	0–0	Juventus	Vicenza
16:00		Report		Stadium: Romeo Menti; Attendance: 19 852; Referee: Graziano Cesari

10 May 1998 33	Empoli	3–2	Vicenza	Empoli
16:00	Esposito 60'pen Bonomi 76'; Baldini 93'	Report	Ambrosetti 31'; Schenardi 87'pen	Stadium: Stadio Carlo Castellani; Attendance: 19 063; Referee: Fiorenzo Treossi

16 May 1998 34	Vicenza	1–3	Udinese	Vicenza
16:30	Dicara 15'	Report	1' Amoroso; 31' Bierhoff; Bierhoff 38'	Stadium: Romeo Menti; Attendance: 18 517; Referee: Gianluca Paparesta

=== UEFA Cup Winners' Cup ===
==== Round of 32 ====
18 September 1997	Vicenza (Italy)	2–0	(Poland) Legia Warsaw	Vicenza
20:45	Luiso 10'; Ambrosetti 24'	Report		Stadium: Romeo Menti; Attendance: 10,081; Referee: (Germany) Hermann Albrecht

2 October 1997	Legia Warsaw (Poland)	1–1	(Italy) Vicenza	Warsaw
20:45	Jacek Kacprzak 57'	Report	86' Lamberto Zauli	Stadium: Stadion Wojska Polskiego; Attendance: 8 000; Referee: (Slovenia) Milan Mitrović

==== Eightfinals ====
23 October 1997	Shakhtar Donetsk (Ukraine)	1–3	(Italy) Vicenza	Donetsk
20:00	Hennadiy Zubov 56'	Report	1', 89' Pasquale Luiso; 49' Massimo Beghetto	Stadium: Stadio Shakhtar; Attendance: 30.000; Referee: (France) Pascal Garibian

6 November 1997	Vicenza (Italy)	2–1	(Ukraine) Shakhtar Donetsk	Vicenza
20:45	Pasquale Luiso 24'; Fabio Viviani 70'	Report	59' Serhiy Atelkin	Stadium: Romeo Menti; Attendance: 9 544; Referee: Roy Helge OlsenNOR

==== Quarterfinals ====
5 March 1998	Roda JC (Netherlands)	1–4	(Italy) Vicenza	Kerkrade
20:45	Bob Peeters 73'	Report	17', 40' Pasquale Luiso; 29' Davide Belotti; 67' Marcelo Otero	Stadium: Stadio Sportpark Kaalheide; Attendance: 14 000; Referee: (Czech Republic) Vaclav Krondl

19 March 1998	Vicenza (Italy)	5–0	(Netherlands) Roda JC	Vicenza
20:45	Pasquale Luiso 4'; Fabio Firmani 24'; Gustavo Mendez 38'; Gabriele Ambrosetti 42'; Lamberto Zauli 47'	Report		Stadium: Stadio Romeo Menti; Attendance: 14 362; Referee: (Scotland) Hugh Dallas

==== Semifinals ====
2 April 1997	Vicenza (Italy)	1–0	(England) Chelsea	Vicenza
20:45	Zauli 16'	Report		Stadium: Stadio Romeo Menti; Attendance: 19 319; Referee: (Spain) Manuel Diaz Vega

16 April 1998	Chelsea (England)	3–1 (3–2 agg.)	(Italy) Vicenza	London
20:45	Gustavo Poyet 34'; Gianfranco Zola 50'; Mark Hughes 76'	Report	32' Pasquale Luiso	Stadium: Stadio Stamford Bridge; Attendance: 33 810

== Statistics ==
=== Players statistics ===
No.	Pos	Nat	Player	Total		Serie A		Coppa		UEFA CWC	
No.	Pos	Nat	Player	Apps	Goals	Apps	Goals	Apps	Goals	Apps	Goals
22	GK	(Italy) ITA	Pierluigi Brivio	42	-65	32	-55	2	-3	8	-7
8	DF	(Uruguay) URU	Gustavo Méndez	35	2	22+4	1	2	0	7	1
5	DF	(Italy) ITA	Davide Belotti	35	1	26+1	0	1	0	7	1
18	DF	(Italy) ITA	Giacomo Dicara	37	3	29	3	1	0	7	0
14	MF	(Italy) ITA	Lamberto Zauli	32	8	18+6	5	2	0	6	3
4	MF	(Italy) ITA	Domenico Di Carlo	40	2	30+1	2	2	0	7	0
7	MF	(Italy) ITA	Marco Schenardi	39	2	28+3	2	2	0	6	0
10	MF	(Italy) ITA	Fabio Viviani	39	1	29+1	0	1	0	8	1
15	MF	(Italy) ITA	Massimo Ambrosini	35	1	25+2	1	1	0	7	0
23	MF	(Italy) ITA	Gabriele Ambrosetti	38	7	21+9	5	1	0	7	2
9	FW	(Italy) ITA	Pasquale Luiso	39	18	27+2	8	2	2	8	8
26	GK	(Italy) ITA	Davide Falcioni	3	-6	2+1	-6				
3	DF	(Italy) ITA	Francesco Coco	26	0	17+3	0	2	0	4	0
20	FW	(Italy) ITA	Arturo Di Napoli	30	7	14+10	6	2	1	4	0
21	DF	(Italy) ITA	Lorenzo Stovini	22	0	12+5	0	1	0	4	0
16	DF	(Italy) ITA	Massimo Beghetto	28	1	11+10	0	2	0	5	1
19	FW	(Uruguay) URU	Marcelo Otero	17	3	10+5	2	0	0	2	1
24	DF	(Uruguay) URU	Ricardo Canals	14	0	9	0	1	0	4	0
28	DF	(Italy) ITA	Mirko Conte	10	0	6+4	0				
6	MF	(Italy) ITA	Roberto Baronio	16	0	3+10	0	1	0	2	0
13	MF	(Italy) ITA	Fabio Firmani	24	1	2+14	0	1	0	7	1
27	MF	(Italy) ITA	Riccardo Maspero	7	0	1+6	0				
11	FW	(Italy) ITA	Alessandro Iannuzzi	1	0	0	0	1	0		
2	DF	(Italy) ITA	Paolo Pasqualin								
12	GK	(Italy) ITA	Roberto Verdi								
17	DF	(Italy) ITA	Sebastiano Sapienza								

- Source: http://calcio-seriea.net/formazioni/1997/1139/
