= 1996–97 Piacenza Calcio season =

Piacenza
1996–97 season
- Manager: Bortolo Mutti
- Serie A: 14th
- Coppa Italia: First round
- Top goalscorer: Pasquale Luiso (14)
Home colours	Away colours	Third colours

Piacenza Calcio once again survived in Serie A, this time being on the brink of relegation, and having to beat Cagliari in Naples in a so-called spareggio to decide which team would stay up. Thanks to a 3–1 victory, Piacenza was able to hang onto their Serie A status, which was all that could be expected from new coach Bortolo Mutti. Despite losing Nicola Caccia to Napoli, Piacenza was able to count on a reliable goal scorer in Pasquale Luiso, who grabbed 14 goals in his debut season in Serie A.

Astonishingly, Piacenza lost just one match at home all season, but instead won no matches on away turf, having won just once in 51 Serie A matches outside the home ground.

== Squad ==
=== Goalkeepers ===
- (Italy) Massimo Taibi
- (Italy) Sergio Marcon

=== Defenders ===
- (Italy) Massimo Brioschi
- (Italy) Mirko Conte
- (Italy) Daniele Cozzi
- (Italy) Daniele Delli Carri
- (Italy) Settimio Lucci
- (Italy) Stefano Maccoppi
- (Italy) Fausto Pari
- (Italy) Cleto Polonia
- (Italy) Simone Corradi
- (Italy) Alessandro Lucarelli
- (Italy) Andrea Tagliaferri

=== Midfielders ===
- (Italy) Eusebio Di Francesco
- (Italy) Luca Matteassi
- (Italy) Daniele Moretti
- (Italy) Gabriele Pin
- (Italy) Giuseppe Scienza
- (Italy) Aladino Valoti
- (Italy) Paolo Tramezzani
- (Italy) Gianpietro Piovani
- (Italy) Fabian Valtolina
- (Italy) Carlo Ballotta

=== Attackers ===
- (Italy) Pasquale Luiso
- (Italy) Andrea Tentoni
- (Italy) Francesco Zerbini
- (Italy) Gabriele Ballotta

== Serie A ==
=== League table ===
Pos	Team	Pld	W	D	L	GF	GA	GD	Pts	Qualification or relegation
12	Roma	34	10	11	13	46	47	−1	41 (Note: Roma finished ahead of Napoli on Goal difference: Roma -1, Napoli -7.)	
13	Napoli	34	9	14	11	38	45	−7	41	
14	Piacenza	34	7	16	11	29	45	−16	37 (Note: CAG: 7 pts; PIA: 5 pts; PER: 4 pts.)	Relegation tie-breaker
15	Cagliari (R)	34	9	10	15	45	55	−10	37 (Note: CAG: 7 pts; PIA: 5 pts; PER: 4 pts.)	Serie B after tie-breaker
16	Perugia (R)	34	10	7	17	48	62	−14	37 (Note: Relegated to 1997-98 Serie B for direct matches.)	Relegation to Serie B

Source: Serie A, RSSSF.com, Soccerway
Rules for classification: 1) Points; 2) Head-to-head points; 3) Head-to-head goal difference; 4) Goal difference; 5) Goals scored; 6) Draw. (Note: Head-to-head record is used only after all the matches between the teams in question have been played).
(R) Relegated

=== Position by round ===
Round	1	2	3	4	5	6	7	8	9	10	11	12	13	14	15	16	17	18	19	20	21	22	23	24	25	26	27	28	29	30	31	32	33	34
Piacenza	15	16	14	11	14	12	8	13	14	14	13	11	13	15	15	14	14	14	14	14	14	14	14	14	14	14	14	14	15	14	15	15	16	14

Source: Serie A
= Relegation to 1997–98 Serie B

=== Matches ===
1	Roma	3–1	Piacenza
	Aldair 13'; Balbo 38'; Fonseca 73'		Luiso 50' (pen.)

2	Piacenza	0–0	Parma

3	Napoli	1–1	Piacenza
	Caccia 30'		Luiso 67'

4	Piacenza	1–0	Vicenza
	Luiso 44'

5	Inter	2–0	Piacenza
	Branca 45'; Branca 48'

6	Piacenza	3–0	Reggiana
	Luiso 23, 76'; Di Francesco 88'

7	Piacenza	2–0	Verona
	Luiso 41' (pen.); Scienza 57'

8	Sampdoria	3–0	Piacenza
	Mancini 16, 79'; Carparelli 53'

9	Piacenza	1–3	Lazio
	Scienza 27'		Signori 5', 40' (pen.), 54'

10	Fiorentina	1–1	Piacenza
	Robbiati 26'		Luiso 64' (pen.)

11	Piacenza	3–2	Milan
	Valoti 9'; Di Francesco 44'; Luiso 71'		Dugarry 47, 68'

12	Bologna	1–1	Piacenza
	Paramatti 52'		Tentoni 89'

13	Atalanta	4–0	Piacenza
	F. Inzaghi 14, 32'; Rotella 54'; Sgrò 62'

14	Piacenza	1–1	Juventus
	Delli Carri 86'		Padovano 59'

15	Cagliari	1–0	Piacenza
	Lønstrup 79'

16	Piacenza	0–0	Udinese

17	Perugia	1–1	Piacenza
	Negri 16'		Scienza 74'

18	Piacenza	0–0	Roma

19	Parma	1–0	Piacenza
	Chiesa 58'

20	Piacenza	1–0	Napoli
	Scienza 34'

21	Vicenza	1–1	Piacenza
	Beghetto 14'		Piovani 4'

22	Piacenza	0–3	Inter
			Ince 39, 45'; Ganz 54'

23	Reggiana	0–0	Piacenza

24	Verona	0–0	Piacenza

25	Piacenza	2–2	Sampdoria
	Tramezzani 14'; Piovani 30'		Montella 39'; Pesaresi 48'

26	Lazio	2–0	Piacenza
	Signori 31' (pen.); Rambaudi 73'

27	Piacenza	1–1	Fiorentina
	Luiso 66'		Amoruso 56'

28	Milan	0–0	Piacenza

29	Piacenza	1–1	Bologna
	Di Francesco 17'		K. Andersson 86'

30	Piacenza	3–1	Atalanta
	Luiso 15, 65'; M. Conte 30'		F. Inzaghi 31'

31	Juventus	4–1	Piacenza
	Zidane 51'; Vieri 54, 88'; Jugović 76'		Luiso 56'

32	Piacenza	1–1	Cagliari
	Luiso 7'		Tovalieri 44'

33	Udinese	4–0	Piacenza
	Sergio 13'; Scienza 18' (o.g.); Poggi 45'; Cappioli 85'

34	Piacenza	2–1	Perugia
	Luiso 30'; Lucci 48' (pen.)		Dicara 90'

==== Relegation tie-breaker ====
15 June 1997	Cagliari	1–3	Piacenza	Naples
	Tovalieri 65'	Report	Luiso 5'; Berretta 38' (o.g.); Luiso 91'	Stadium: Stadio San Paolo; Attendance: 25,000; Referee: Stefano Braschi (Prato)

Cagliari relegated to 1997–98 Serie B.

=== Top scorers ===
- (Italy) Pasquale Luiso 14 (3)
- (Italy) Giuseppe Scienza 4
- (Italy) Eusebio Di Francesco 3
- (Italy) Gianpietro Piovani 2

== Sources ==
- RSSSF - Italy Championship 1996/97
