= 2002–03 Torino Calcio season =

Torino Calcio
2002–03 season
- Chairman: Attilio Romero
- Manager: Giancarlo Camolese; Renzo Ulivieri; Renato Zaccarelli; Giacomo Ferri
- Stadium: Stadio Delle Alpi; Stadio Giglio (vs Reggina, Perugia, Udinese, Empoli); Stadio Ennio Tardini (vs Piacenza)
- Serie A: 18th (relegated)
- Coppa Italia: Second round
- Top goalscorer: League: Marco Ferrante (6); All: Marco Ferrante (8)
Home colours	Away colours

During the 2002–03 Italian football season, Torino Calcio competed in the Serie A.

== Season summary ==
Torino finished the season in 18th position in the Serie A table, meaning that they were relegated back to the Serie B after two seasons. In other competitions, Torino reached the second round of the Coppa Italia.

Marco Ferrante was the top scorer for Torino with 8 goals in all competitions.

== Kit ==
Torino's kit was manufactured by Japanese sports retailer Asics and sponsored by Ixfin.

== Squad ==
Note: Flags indicate national team as defined under FIFA eligibility rules; some limited exceptions apply. Players may hold more than one non-FIFA nationality.

No.	Pos.	Nation	Player
1	GK	ITA	Luca Bucci
2	DF	ITA	Luigi Garzya
3	MF	ITA	Gianmarco Frezza
4	DF	ITA	Federico Balzaretti
5	DF	ITA	Daniele Delli Carri
6	DF	ITA	Gianluca Comotto
7	FW	URU	José Franco
8	MF	ITA	Alessio Scarchilli
9	FW	ITA	Cristiano Lucarelli
10	FW	ITA	Marco Ferrante
11	FW	SWE	Yksel Osmanovski
15	MF	ITA	Simone Vergassola
16	GK	ITA	Stefano Sorrentino
17	MF	ITA	Vincenzo Sommese
18	DF	ITA	Giovanni Lopez
19	MF	ARG	Carlos Marinelli

No.	Pos.	Nation	Player
21	FW	URU	Federico Magallanes
22	GK	AUT	Alex Manninger
23	DF	ITA	Andrea Mantovani
24	FW	ITA	Gaetano Masucci
25	DF	BRA	Ronaldo Vanin
26	FW	NGA	Akeem Omolade
28	MF	ITA	Alessandro Conticchio
29	MF	ITA	Massimo Donati
30	DF	ITA	Luca Mezzano
31	DF	ITA	Paolo Castellini
32	MF	ITA	Francesco Statuto
33	GK	ITA	Alberto Maria Fontana
34	MF	ITA	Alessandro Campo
35	DF	ITA	Stefano Fattori
36	DF	ITA	Giovanni Marchese
51	MF	ITA	Diego De Ascentis

== Competitions ==
=== Serie A ===
Pos	Team	Pld	W	D	L	GF	GA	GD	Pts	Qualification or relegation
14	Reggina	34	10	8	16	38	53	−15	38 (Note: Modena finished ahead of Empoli, Atalanta and Reggina on head-to-head points: Modena: 10 pts, Empoli: 9 pts, Atalanta: 7 pts, Reggina: 5 pts.)	Relegation tie-breaker
15	Atalanta (R)	34	8	14	12	35	47	−12	38	Serie B after tie-breaker (Note: Atalanta to 2003–04 Serie B after tie-breaker.)
16	Piacenza (R)	34	8	6	20	44	62	−18	30	Relegation to Serie B
17	Como (R)	34	4	12	18	29	57	−28	24	Relegation to Serie B
18	Torino (R)	34	4	9	21	23	58	−35	21	Relegation to Serie B

Source: 2002–03 Serie A, Soccerway
Rules for classification: 1) Points; 2) Head-to-head points; 3) Head-to-head goal difference; 4) Goal difference; 5) Goals scored; 6) Draw. (Note: Head-to-head record is used only after all the matches between the teams in question have been played).
(R) Relegated
