= 2001–02 Torino Calcio season =

Torino Calcio
2001–02 season
- Chairman: Attilio Romero
- Head Coach: Giancarlo Camolese
- Serie A: 11th
- Coppa Italia: Second round
- Top goalscorer: League: Marco Ferrante (10); All: Marco Ferrante (11)
- Highest home attendance: 38,640 (vs. Juventus)
- Lowest home attendance: 4,766 (vs. Sampdoria)
- Average home league attendance: 19,002
Home colours	Away colours	Third colours

Torino Calcio had a solid season, in which it earned a new contract as a newcomer. The most appreciated player in the squad was right-winger Antonino Asta, who got a late breakthrough at the age of 31, and proved to be the key player as the club stayed above the drop zone by just four points. Marco Ferrante returned from Inter, and scored ten goals, a career best for the experienced striker. The squad also featured the highly rated Swedish striker Yksel Osmanovski, a very young future Italian national team striker in Fabio Quagliarella, and the Turin legend, defender Stefano Fattori.

== Squad ==
=== Goalkeepers ===
- (Italy) Luca Bucci
- (Italy) Stefano Sorrentino
- (Italy) Gabriele Paoletti

=== Defenders ===
- (Italy) Luigi Garzya
- (Italy) Gianluca Comotto
- (Italy) Daniele Delli Carri
- (Italy) Giovanni Lopez
- (Italy) Luca Mezzano
- (Italy) Riccardo Fissore
- (Italy) Fabio Galante
- (Italy) Mirko Cudini
- (Brazil) Ronaldo Vanin
- (Italy) Alessandro Cibocchi
- (Italy) Daniele Martinelli
- (Italy) Paolo Castellini
- (Italy) Stefano Fattori

=== Midfielders ===
- (Italy) Giorgio Venturin
- (Italy) Alessio Scarchilli
- (Italy) Massimo Brambilla
- (Italy) Antonino Asta
- (Italy) Franco Semioli
- (France) Benoît Cauet
- (Italy) Riccardo Maspero
- (Italy) Diego De Ascentis

=== Attackers ===
- (Brazil) Pinga
- (Uruguay) José María Franco
- (Italy) Cristiano Lucarelli
- (Sweden) Yksel Osmanovski
- (Italy) Fabio Quagliarella
- (Italy) Paolo Rossi
- (Italy) Simone Tiribocchi
- (Nigeria) Akeem Omoulade
- (Italy) Emanuele Calaiò
- (Italy) Marco Ferrante

== Serie A ==
Pos	Team	Pld	W	D	L	GF	GA	GD	Pts	Qualification or relegation
9	Atalanta	34	12	9	13	41	50	−9	45	
10	Parma (Note: Parma gained entry to the 2002–03 UEFA Cup as the 2001–02 Coppa Italia champions.)	34	12	8	14	43	47	−4	44	Qualification to UEFA Cup first round
11	Torino (Note: Torino gained entry to the 2002 UEFA Intertoto Cup after Atalanta declined to take part.)	34	10	13	11	37	39	−2	43	Qualification to Intertoto Cup second round
12	Piacenza	34	11	9	14	49	43	+6	42	
13	Brescia	34	9	13	12	43	52	−9	40 (Note: Brescia finished ahead of Udinese on head-to-head goal difference: Brescia 2–0 Udinese, Udinese 3–2 Brescia.)	

Source: 2001–02 Serie A, Soccerway
Rules for classification: 1) Points; 2) Head-to-head points; 3) Head-to-head goal difference; 4) Goal difference; 5) Goals scored; 6) Draw. (Note: Head-to-head record is used only after all the matches between the teams in question have been played).

=== Matches ===
1	Udinese	2–2	Torino
	Muzzi 63'; Pavón 65'		Galante 11'; Osmanovski 43'

2	Torino	1–3	Brescia
	Lucarelli 30'		Tare 9', 68'; Baggio 89' (pen.)

3	Lazio	0–0	Torino

4	Torino	0–1	Inter
			Kallon 73' (pen.)

5	Piacenza	3–1	Torino
	Hübner 9', 87' (pen.) [[Carmine Gautieri]|Gautieri]] 65'		Lucarelli 59'

6	Juventus	3–3	Torino
	Del Piero 9', 26'; Tudor 12'		Lucarelli 57'; Ferrante 70' (pen.); Maspero 83'

7	Torino	1–0	Perugia
	Ferrante 26'

8	Chievo	3–0	Torino
	Marazzina 31'; Manfredini 50'; Eriberto 81'

9	Torino	1–0	Milan
	Lucarelli 27'

10	Fiorentina	0–0	Torino

11	Torino	5–1	Verona
	Ferrante 71', 89'; Vergassola 75'; Galante 77'; Lucarelli 86'		Mutu 11'

12	Bologna	1–0	Torino
	Olive 5'

13	Torino	1–2	Atalanta
	Galante 13'		Doni 45'; Colombo 69'

14	Lecce	1–1	Torino
	Cimirotič 48'		Lucarelli 75'

15	Torino	1–0	Parma
	Ferrante 45+1'

16	Torino	1–2	Venezia
	Comotto 64'		Maniero 15', 90'

17	Roma	1–0	Torino
	Totti 69'

18	Torino	3–1	Udinese
	Lucarelli 26' (pen.), 83'; Maspero 69'		Iaquinta 45'

19	Brescia	1–2	Torino
	Yllana 52'		Ferrante 82'; Vergassola 87'

20	Torino	1–0	Lazio
	Lucarelli 62'

21	Inter	0–0	Torino

22	Torino	1–1	Piacenza
	Ferrante 82'		Hübner 73'

23	Parma	0–1	Torino
			Comotto 88'

24	Torino	2–2	Juventus
	Ferrante 64'; Cauet 80'		David Trezeguet 10'; Maresca 89'

25	Perugia	2–0	Torino
	O'Neill 26'; Vryzas 72'

26	Torino	2–2	Chievo
	Ferrante 35'; Maspero 59'		Corradi 20', 53'

27	Milan	2–1	Torino
	Kaladze 51'; Ambrosini 79'		Ferrante 64' (pen.)

28	Torino	1–0	Fiorentina
	Scarchilli 24'

29	Verona	0–1	Torino
			Franco 26'

30	Torino	1–1	Bologna
	Scarchilli 19'		Julio Cruz 50'

31	Atalanta	1–1	Torino
	Beretta 15'		Franco 50'

32	Torino	1–1	Lecce
	Franco 76'		Popescu 35'

33	Venezia	1–1	Torino
	Maniero 7' (pen.)		Galante 90'

34	Torino	0–1	Roma
			Cassano 68'

=== Topscorers ===
- (Italy) Marco Ferrante 10
- (Italy) Cristiano Lucarelli 9
- (Italy) Fabio Galante 4
- (Italy) Riccardo Maspero 3
- (Uruguay) José María Franco 3

== Sources ==
- RSSSF - Italy 2001/02
