= 2001–02 Piacenza Calcio season =

Piacenza
2001–02 season
- Manager: Walter Novellino
- Serie A: 12th
- Coppa Italia: Round of 16
- Top goalscorer: Dario Hübner (24)
- Average home league attendance: 9,533

Piacenza Calcio had the highest-scoring season in the club's history, but in spite of this, a defeat to Verona in the final round would have rendered relegation. Two goals from Dario Hübner helped sealing a 3–0 victory, which propelled Hübner to become top scorer of the entire Serie A, tying for 24 goals with David Trezeguet. The ex-Brescia hitman Hübner came following the promotion, and aged 34, he reached the very top of his level.

The season also saw the first three foreign players arrive at Piacenza. Brazilians Matuzalém and Amauri were the most prominent of those.

== Squad ==
=== Goalkeepers ===
- (Italy) Matteo Guardalben
- (Italy) Paolo Orlandoni
- (Italy) Cristiano Scalabrelli

=== Defenders ===
- (Italy) Nicola Boselli
- (Italy) Giuseppe Cardone
- (Italy) Filippo Cristante
- (Italy) Gianluca Lamacchi
- (Italy) Alessandro Lucarelli
- (Italy) Roberto Maltagliati
- (Italy) Nicola Mora
- (Italy) Stefano Sacchetti
- (Italy) Vittorio Tosto

=== Midfielders ===
- (Italy) Gabriele Ambrosetti
- (Italy) Eusebio Di Francesco
- (Brazil) Matuzalém
- (Italy) Salvatore Miceli
- (Romania) Bogdan Pătraşcu
- (Italy) Vincenzo Sommense
- (Italy) Francesco Statuto
- (Italy) Sergio Volpi
- (Italy) Paolo Tramezzani

=== Attackers ===
- (Italy) Dario Hübner
- (Italy) Nicola Caccia
- (Brazil) Amauri
- (Italy) Paolo Poggi
- (Italy) Massimo Rastelli
- (Italy) Daniele Cacia
- (Italy) Francesco Palmieri
- (Italy) Francesco Zerbini

== Serie A ==
| Pos | Team | Pld | W | D | L | GF | GA | GD | Pts | Qualification or relegation |
|---|---|---|---|---|---|---|---|---|---|---|
| 10 | Parma (Note: Parma gained entry to the 2002–03 UEFA Cup as the 2001–02 Coppa Italia champions.) | 34 | 12 | 8 | 14 | 43 | 47 | −4 | 44 | Qualification to UEFA Cup first round |
| 11 | Torino (Note: Torino gained entry to the 2002 UEFA Intertoto Cup after Atalanta declined to take part.) | 34 | 10 | 13 | 11 | 37 | 39 | −2 | 43 | Qualification to Intertoto Cup second round |
| 12 | Piacenza | 34 | 11 | 9 | 14 | 49 | 43 | +6 | 42 | |
| 13 | Brescia | 34 | 9 | 13 | 12 | 43 | 52 | −9 | 40 (Note: Brescia finished ahead of Udinese on head-to-head goal difference: Brescia 2–0 Udinese, Udinese 3–2 Brescia.) | |
| 14 | Udinese | 34 | 11 | 7 | 16 | 41 | 52 | −11 | 40 | |

Source: 2001–02 Serie A, Soccerway
Rules for classification: 1) Points; 2) Head-to-head points; 3) Head-to-head goal difference; 4) Goal difference; 5) Goals scored; 6) Draw. (Note: Head-to-head record is used only after all the matches between the teams in question have been played).

=== Matches ===
| 1 | Lazio | 1–1 | Piacenza |
| | C. López 49' | | Matuzalém 61' |

| 2 | Piacenza | 1–2 | Lecce |
| | Gautieri 45' | | Giacomazzi 67, 86' |

| 3 | Piacenza | 2–0 | Roma |
| | Hübner 38'; Di Francesco 51' |

| 4 | Chievo | 4–2 | Piacenza |
| | Corini 13' (pen.), 67'; Manfredini 37'; Perrotta 47' | | Hübner 8, 87' |

| 5 | Piacenza | 3–1 | Torino |
| | Hübner 9', 87' (pen.); Gautieri 65' | | C. Lucarelli 59' |

| 6 | Parma | 2–2 | Piacenza |
| | Di Vaio 40'; Appiah 79' | | Hübner 50, 73' |

| 7 | Piacenza | 0–1 | Brescia |
| | | | R. Baggio 17' |

| 8 | Perugia | 1–0 | Piacenza |
| | Tedesco 70' |

| 9 | Piacenza | 1–2 | Udinese |
| | Hübner 55' (pen.) | | Di Michele 23'; Muzzi 59' (pen.) |

| 10 | Milan | 0–0 | Piacenza |

| 11 | Piacenza | 1–2 | Atalanta |
| | Hübner 7' (pen.) | | Doni 59, 81' |

| 12 | Fiorentina | 1–3 | Piacenza |
| | Benin 77' | | Poggi 1'; Hübner 84'; Statuto 88' |

| 13 | Piacenza | 2–0 | Bologna |
| | Hübner 50, 64' |

| 14 | Juventus | 2–0 | Piacenza |
| | Ferrara 31'; Trezeguet 90' |

| 15 | Venezia | 2–3 | Piacenza |
| | Maniero 32'; Magallanes 56' | | Gautieri 51'; Poggi 80, 81' |

| 16 | Piacenza | 2–3 | Inter |
| | Gautieri 55, 74' | | Vieri 45' (pen.), 83'; Kallon 69' |

| 17 | Verona | 1–0 | Piacenza |
| | Zanchi 74' |

| 18 | Piacenza | 1–0 | Lazio |
| | Hübner 69' |

| 19 | Lecce | 0–0 | Piacenza |

| 20 | Roma | 2–0 | Piacenza |
| | Assunção 14'; Batistuta 77' |

| 21 | Piacenza | 2–2 | Chievo |
| | Hübner 45' (pen.); Di Francesco 62' | | Marazzina 31'; Cossato 83' |

| 22 | Torino | 1–1 | Piacenza |
| | Ferrante 82' | | Hübner 73' |

| 23 | Piacenza | 5–0 | Venezia |
| | Gautieri 6'; Hübner 32, 37'; Di Francesco 46, 68' |

| 24 | Piacenza | 2–3 | Parma |
| | Hübner 35', 90' (pen.) | | Di Vaio 30'; Micoud 42'; Boghossian 73' |

| 25 | Brescia | 2–2 | Piacenza |
| | Caracciolo 59, 71' | | Sommense 62'; Hübner 68' |

| 26 | Piacenza | 2–0 | Perugia |
| | Di Francesco 31'; Hübner 85' |

| 27 | Udinese | 1–1 | Piacenza |
| | Muzzi 88' | | Gautieri 37' |

| 28 | Piacenza | 0–1 | Milan |
| | | | Serginho 66' (pen.) |

| 29 | Atalanta | 1–1 | Piacenza |
| | Comandini 45' | | Cardone 71' |

| 30 | Piacenza | 3–0 | Fiorentina |
| | Matuzalém 24'; Volpi 40'; Hübner 45' |

| 31 | Bologna | 1–2 | Piacenza |
| | Fresi 61' | | Tosto 48'; Di Francesco 50' |

| 32 | Piacenza | 0–1 | Juventus |
| | | | Nedvěd 43' |

| 33 | Inter | 3–1 | Piacenza |
| | Córdoba 7'; Recoba 70'; Ronaldo 80' | | Matuzalém 36' |

| 34 | Piacenza | 3–0 | Verona |
| | Volpi 25'; Hübner 47' (pen.), 84' |

=== Top Scorers ===
- (Italy) Dario Hübner 24 (6)
- (Italy) Carmine Gautieri 7
- (Italy) Eusebio Di Francesco 6
- (Brazil) Matuzalém 3
- (Italy) Paolo Poggi 3

== Sources ==
- RSSSF - Italy 2001/02
