= 1997 Supercoppa Italiana =

- Event: Supercoppa Italiana
Juventus	Vicenza
Serie A	Coppa Italia
3	0
- Date: 23 August 1997
- Venue: Stadio delle Alpi, Turin
- Referee: Livio Bazzoli
- Attendance: 16,157

The 1997 Supercoppa Italia was the tenth edition of the Supercoppa Italiana. It was played between Juventus, the 1996–97 Serie A winner, and Vicenza, the 1996–97 Coppa Italia winner.

Juventus won the match 3–0 and claiming their second Supercoppa Italiana title.

== Background ==
This was the tenth edition of the Supercoppa Italiana with the first edition being held back in 1987. For Juventus this was the third time that they had competed at the Supercoppa Italiana with two previous appearances at the 1990 edition where they lost to SSC Napoli and the 1995 edition in which they defeated Parma. For Vicenza, they were making their Supercoppa Italiana debut.

== Match details ==
23 August 1997
20:30 CET

Juventus	3–0	Vicenza
Inzaghi 4', 10'; Conte 80'	Report

Stadio delle Alpi, Turin
Attendance: 16,157
Referee: Livio Bazzoli

Juventus	Vicenza

GK	1	(Italy) Angelo Peruzzi
RB	15	(Italy) Alessandro Birindelli
CB	2	(Italy) Ciro Ferrara
CB	4	(Uruguay) Paolo Montero
LB	22	(Italy) Gianluca Pessotto
CM	7	(Italy) Angelo Di Livio
CM	14	(France) Didier Deschamps		(substituted off) 81'
CM	8	(Italy) Antonio Conte (c)
AM	21	(France) Zinedine Zidane		(substituted off) 66'
CF	9	(Italy) Filippo Inzaghi	Booked
CF	10	(Italy) Alessandro Del Piero		(substituted off) 66'
Substitutes:
GK	12	(Italy) Michelangelo Rampulla
DF	6	(Portugal) Dimas Teixeira
DF	23	(Italy) Marco Zamboni
MF	5	(Italy) Fabio Pecchia		(substituted in) 66'
MF	20	(Italy) Alessio Tacchinardi		(substituted in) 81'
FW	11	(Italy) Michele Padovano	Booked	(substituted in) 66'
FW	16	(Italy) Nicola Amoruso
Manager:
(Italy) Marcello Lippi

GK	22	(Italy) Pierluigi Brivio
RB	10	(Italy) Fabio Viviani
CB	21	(Italy) Lorenzo Stovini	Booked
CB	24	(Uruguay) Ricardo Canals
LB	3	(Italy) Francesco Coco
RM	7	(Italy) Marco Schenardi
CM	4	(Italy) Domenico Di Carlo (c)
CM	6	(Italy) Roberto Baronio		(substituted off) 69'
LM	15	(Italy) Massimo Ambrosini
AM	23	(Italy) Gabriele Ambrosetti		(substituted off) 61'
CF	9	(Italy) Pasquale Luiso		(substituted off) 75'
Substitutes:
GK	1	(Italy) Luca Mondini
MF	13	(Italy) Luca Firmani
MF	14	(Italy) Lamberto Zauli		(substituted in) 69'
MF	16	(Italy) Massimo Beghetto		(substituted in) 61'
FW	11	(Italy) Alessandro Iannuzzi
FW	19	(Uruguay) Marcelo Otero		(substituted in) 75'
FW	20	(Italy) Arturo Di Napoli
Manager:
(Italy) Francesco Guidolin

MATCH OFFICIALS

- Assistant referees:
- Fourth official:

MATCH RULES

- 90 minutes.
- 30 minutes of extra-time if necessary.
- Penalty shoot-out if scores still level.
- Seven named substitutes
- Maximum of 3 substitutions.

== See also ==
- 1997–98 Juventus FC season
- 1997–98 Vicenza Calcio season
