= Maltagliati (surname) =

Maltagliati is a surname. Notable people with the surname include:

- Evi Maltagliati (1908–1986), Italian stage, television and film actress
- Roberto Maltagliati (born 1969), Italian footballer
- Sergio Maltagliati (born 1960), Italian Internet-based artist, composer, and visual-digital artist
