= Falcioni =

Falcioni is an Italian surname. Notable people with the surname include:

- Davide Falcioni (born 1975), Italian footballer
- Julio César Falcioni (born 1956), Argentine footballer and manager
- Mónica Falcioni (born 1968), Uruguayan long and triple jumper
