= Fattori =

Fattori is an Italian surname. Notable people with the surname include:

- Alessandro Fattori (born 1973), Italian alpine skier
- Bruno Fattori (1891–1985), Italian poet
- Domenico Fattori, Sammarinese politician
- Federico Fattori (born 1992), Argentine footballer
- Giovanni Fattori (1825–1908), Italian artist
- Osvaldo Fattori (1922–2017), Italian footballer
- Stefano Fattori (born 1972), Italian footballer
