= Delli Carri =

Delli Carri is an Italian surname. Notable people with the surname include:

- Daniele Delli Carri (born 1971), Italian footballer
- Filippo Delli Carri (born 1999), Italian footballer
