= Rodolfo Giorgetti =

Italian footballer

Personal information
- Date of birth: 19 August 1971 (age 55)
- Place of birth: Seregno, Italy
- Height: 1.72 m (5 ft 8 in)
- Position: Midfielder

Senior career*
Years	Team	Apps	(Gls)
1990–1991	Ancona	0	(0)
1991–1993	Ravenna	47	(1)
1993–1994	Fano	25	(1)
1994–1996	Ravenna	63	(7)
1996–2000	Bari	72	(4)
2000–2003	Lecce	57	(2)
2003	Salernitana	13	(0)
2004–2005	Fano	39	(0)
2005–2006	Vigor Senigallia		
Total		316	(15)

Managerial career
- 2010–2011: Ravenna (youth)
- 2011–2013: Ravenna
- 2014: Real Vicenza (assistant)
- 2014: Pordenone (assistant)
- 2015–2016: Santarcangelo (assistant)
- 2016: Teramo (assistant)
- 2016–2017: Teramo (assistant)
- * Club domestic league appearances and goals

Rodolfo Giorgetti (born 19 August 1971) is an Italian former professional footballer who played as a midfielder.

== Career ==
Having started his career at Ancona, Giorgetti stood out during his career, especially playing for the teams of Ravenna, where he was champion of C2 and C1 consecutively, and Bari, where he played for five seasons in Serie A.

After retiring as a player, Giorgetti was Ravenna FC youth and first-team coach, and after the spell at the club became the main assistant of Lamberto Zauli.

== Honours ==
=== Player ===
Ravenna

- Serie C1: 1992–93 (group A)
- Serie C2: 1991–92 (group A)

=== Manager ===
Ravenna

- Promozione: 2012–13 (Emilia-Romagna)
