= Francesco Zitolo =

Italian footballer

Personal information
- Date of birth: 20 November 1981 (age 44)
- Place of birth: Cerignola, Italy
- Height: 1.76 m (5 ft 9 in)
- Position: Midfielder

Senior career*
Years	Team	Apps	(Gls)
1998–1999	Pro Vercelli	0	(0)
1999–2001	Piacenza	4	(0)
2001–2004	Pisa	38	(0)
2003	→ Torres (loan)	10	(1)
2004–2005	Torres	17	(1)
2005–2006	Pisa	15	(1)
2006–2009	Polisportiva Alghero	67	(17)
Total		151	(20)
- * Club domestic league appearances and goals

Francesco Zitolo (born 20 November 1981) is an Italian former professional footballer who played as a midfielder.

== Career ==
Having started his career at Pro Vercelli in 1998, Zitolo participated in Piacenza campaign in the 1999-2000 Serie A. He later accumulated spells at Pisa SC and SEF Torres, ending his career at Polisportiva Alghero in 2009.
