= Nuova Verolese Calcio ASD =

Italian football club

Nuova Verolese
- Full name: Nuova Verolese Calcio Associazione Sportiva Dilettantistica
- Founded: 1911; 1976 (refounded)
- Ground: Stadio Enrico Bragadina, Verolanuova, Italy
- Capacity: 1,100
- 2011–12: Eccellenza/C, 14th (relegated)
Home colours	Away colours

Nuova Verolese Calcio Associazione Sportiva Dilettantistica was a football team based on Verolanuova, Lombardy.

== History ==
=== Foundation ===
The club was founded in 1911 and refounded in 1976.

=== Dissolution ===
In the season 2009–10, the club from Eccellenza Lombardy was promoted to Serie D, but the following season was immediately again relegated to Eccellenza Lombardy. In the season 2011–12 it was relegated to Promozione.

Following the launch of a collaborative project with A.S.D. S.S. Dellese, to merge the two companies in the next season, the team does not join 2012–13 championship. although officially it is still called Dellese. Its biggest rivality was with Orceana Calcio.
