= Alessio Scarchilli =

Italian footballer (born 1972)

Personal information
- Date of birth: September 10, 1972 (age 54)
- Place of birth: Rome, Italy
- Height: 1.80 m (5 ft 11 in)
- Position: Midfielder

Senior career*
| Years | Team | Apps | (Gls) |
| 1991–1996 | Roma | 26 | (5) |
| 1992–1993 | → Lecce (loan) | 32 | (3) |
| 1994–1995 | → Udinese (loan) | 33 | (5) |
| 1996–2003 | Torino | 120 | (17) |
| 1997–1998 | → Sampdoria (loan) | 21 | (1) |
| 2003–2004 | Mons | 7 | (0) |
| 2004–2005 | Teramo | 9 | (0) |
| 2005–2006 | Viterbese | 18 | (3) |

International career
| 1993–1994 | Italy U-21 | 9 | (0) |
- * Club domestic league appearances and goals

Alessio Scarchilli (born September 10, 1972) is a retired Italian professional football player. He played for 6 seasons (93 games, 10 goals) in the Serie A for A.S. Roma, U.C. Sampdoria and most notably for Torino F.C. He played in the UEFA Cup for Roma and Sampdoria.

Scarchilli began playing football in A.S. Roma's youth system. After graduating to the club's senior side, Scarchilli made his Serie B debut with U.S. Lecce while out on loan from Roma. After he helped Lecce earn promotion to Serie A during the 1992–93 season, Scarchilli returned to Roma.

He represented Italy in the 1994 UEFA European Under-21 Football Championship.

Currently, he works as a TV commentator on a channel dedicated to A.S. Roma.
