= Giuseppe Scienza =

Italian footballer

Personal information
- Date of birth: 14 October 1966 (age 60)
- Place of birth: Domodossola, Italy
- Height: 1.72 m (5 ft 8 in)
- Position: Midfielder

Senior career*
Years	Team	Apps	(Gls)
1983–1984	Omegna		
1984–1985	Torino		
1985–1987	Calcio Campania		
1987–1988	Foggia		
1988–1990	Catania		
1990–1991	Reggina		
1991–1994	Reggiana		
1994–1995	Torino		
1995–1996	Venezia		
1996–1998	Piacenza		
1998–1999	Torino		
1999–2001	Cesena		
2001	Castel di Sangro		
2001–2002	Pro Patria		

Managerial career
- 2002–2005: Pro Patria (youth)
- 2005–2007: Novara (youth)
- 2007–2009: Torino (juniors)
- 2009–2010: Legnano
- 2010–2011: Viareggio
- 2011: Brescia
- 2012–2013: Cremonese
- 2013–2015: FeralpiSalò
- 2015: Alessandria
- 2016–2017: FC Chiasso
- 2017–2019: Monopoli
- 2019–2021: Monopoli
- 2021: Pro Vercelli
- * Club domestic league appearances and goals

Giuseppe Scienza (born 14 October 1966) is an Italian football manager and former player who played as a midfielder.

== Playing career ==
Scienza played Serie A level for Reggiana, Torino and Piacenza. He retired in 2002 to pursue a career as a coach.

== Coaching career ==
In 2011, following two stints at minor clubs Legnano and Viareggio, Scienza was named new head coach of Serie B club Brescia, guiding them until December of that year. He successively worked regularly at Serie C clubs, being in charge of teams such as Cremonese, FeralpiSalò and Alessandria. He then moved to Switzerland to guide Challenge League club FC Chiasso during the 2016–17 season.

In 2017 he took over at Serie C club Monopoli, which he coached for four seasons, apart from a short break in 2019. During his tenure at Monopoli, he achieved a third place by the end of the 2019–20 Serie C season, and consistently guiding the small Apulian club to the promotion playoffs.

On 23 June 2021, he joined Serie C club Pro Vercelli on a two-year contract. He was dismissed on 5 December 2021 following a string of negative results.
