= Roberto Maltagliati =

Italian footballer

Personal information
- Date of birth: 7 April 1969 (age 57)
- Place of birth: Cuggiono, Italy
- Height: 1.87 m (6 ft 1 1/2 in)
- Position: Defender

Senior career*
Years	Team	Apps	(Gls)
1989–1992	Corsico	64	(2)
1992–1993	Solbiatese	34	(0)
1993–1994	Parma	10	(0)
1994–2000	Torino	173	(1)
2000–2002	Piacenza	32	(1)
2002–2004	Ancona	56	(0)
2004–2005	Cagliari	46	(0)
2005–2007	Spezia	41	(0)
2007–2008	Canavese	12	(0)
Total		468	(4)
- * Club domestic league appearances and goals

Roberto Maltagliati (born 7 April 1969 in Cuggiono, Milan) is a former Italian footballer who played as a defender.

During his career of more than eighteen years, including seven in Serie A, he has played for Parma, Torino (from 1994–1995 to 1999–2000), Piacenza, Ancona and Cagliari. He then moved to Spezia, being one of their best players during the 2005–06 Serie C1/A campaign which ended in a surprise promotion ahead of Genoa C.F.C.

In 2007, he signed for newly promoted Serie C2 side Canavese.
