= Paolo Cristallini =

Italian footballer

Personal information
- Date of birth: 20 September 1971 (age 55)
- Place of birth: Milan, Italy
- Height: 1.79 m (5 ft 10 in)
- Position: Midfielder

Youth career
- –1988: Pisa

Senior career*
Years	Team	Apps	(Gls)
1988–1994	Pisa	97	(5)
1994–1997	Torino	80	(7)
1997–1998	Bologna	19	(1)
1998–2001	Piacenza	76	(5)
2001–2006	Vicenza	79	(6)
Total		351	(24)

Managerial career
- 2006–2016: Vicenza (director of football)
- 2017–2018: Brescia (director of football)
- 2018–2020: Sassuolo (scout)
- 2020–: Verona (scout)
- * Club domestic league appearances and goals

Paolo Cristallini (born 20 September 1971), is an Italian former professional footballer who played as a midfielder.

== Playing career ==
Paolo Cristallini began his career with Pisa SC in the 1988–89 season, but without participating in the team's relegation campaign to Serie B. In the following season, he made 3 appearances, in what was the club's return to Serie A. He played for the club until the bankrupt in 1994, moving to Torino. For the 1997–98 season, Cristallini was acquired by Bologna for a fee of six and a half million lira. Later he still defended Piacenza and Vicenza, always in the first two divisions of Italian football.

== Style of play ==
Cristallini stood out for his commitment to individual marking and sometimes for violence, being one of the record holders of sent offs in the 1995–96 season. He also had a strong leadership spirit.

== Post-playing career ==
After retiring as a player, Cristallini worked for more than 10 years at LR Vicenza, holding the positions of sporting director and general director. In 2017 he was hired by Brescia to perform the same role, remaining until March 2018. He later became scout director, working at US Sassuolo and currently at Hellas Verona.
