= Vincenzo Sommese =

Italian footballer

Personal information
- Full name: Vincenzo Sommese
- Date of birth: June 22, 1976 (age 50)
- Place of birth: Nola, Italy
- Height: 1.74 m (5 ft 9 in)
- Position: Midfielder

Senior career*
Years	Team	Apps	(Gls)
1993–1994	Nola	14	(1)
1995–2003	Torino	128	(9)
2000–2001	→ Vicenza (loan)	44	(7)
2002	→ Piacenza (loan)	10	(1)
2003–2004	Ancona	26	(1)
2004–2005	Modena	22	(4)
2005–2007	Mantova	61	(5)
2008–2011	Ascoli	99	(8)
- * Club domestic league appearances and goals as of 1 August 2011

Vincenzo Sommese (born 22 June 1976 in Nola) is an Italian former footballer.

== Career ==
Sommese started his career at Nola of Serie C2. He was signed by Torino in November 1994, and made his Serie A debut on 6 April 1996, against Juventus FC, but Torino fall to Serie B in that summer.

After a short return to Serie A in 1999/00 season, Sommese played in Serie B again in summer 2000.

But in October 2000, he was sold to Vicenza of Serie A in joint ownership bid, but the Serie A career end again after the club fall to Serie B in summer 2001.

He played half of the Serie B season for Vicenza, before returned to Serie A again for Piacenza on loan in January 2002.

He returned to Torino in summer 2002, but Sommese once again faced relegation to Serie B as the Turin club finished the last.

Sommese then joined Serie A newcomer Ancona, but faced his fifth relegation to Serie B.

Sommese received an offer from Modena, a first "currently" Serie B club at the time he was signed.

One season later, he joined Mantova of Serie B and played for two seasons, before he was banned from football due to betting.

In January 2008, after his ban has expired, he was signed by Ascoli of Serie B, and scored a goal in the debut.

== Honours and awards ==
- Serie B runner-up: 1999
