= Lorenzo Stovini =

Italian footballer

Personal information
- Date of birth: 24 November 1976 (age 49)
- Place of birth: Florence, Italy
- Height: 1.86 m (6 ft 1 in)
- Position: Defender

Youth career
- 1993–1997: Roma

Senior career*
Years	Team	Apps	(Gls)
1997–1999	Vicenza	48	(0)
1999–2001	Reggina	66	(1)
2001–2006	Lecce	160	(2)
2006–2009	Catania	102	(3)
2009–2012	Empoli	107	(5)
2012–2013	Brescia	13	(0)
- * Club domestic league appearances and goals

Lorenzo Stovini (born 24 November 1976) is a former Italian footballer who played as a defender.

== Career ==
He made his Serie A debut on 31 August 1997 playing for Vicenza against Sampdoria in Stadio Luigi Ferraris (3–1). In the past, he was also Lecce captain.

=== Calcio Catania ===
Since he joined Calcio Catania, he is currently competing in the Italian Serie A. Since joining the Sicilian side from US Lecce, Stovini has been a big part of the club's first team. He was an influential part of there Serie A survival in the center of defence, along with Christian Terlizzi, during the 2006–07 Serie A campaign as well as the 2007–08 Serie A season.

=== Empoli ===
On 4 November 2009, he signed with Serie B team Empoli.
