= Marco Schenardi =

Italian footballer

Personal information
- Date of birth: 3 March 1968 (age 58)
- Place of birth: San Giorgio Piacentino, Italy
- Height: 1.71 m (5 ft 7 in)
- Position: Midfielder

Youth career
- Cremonese

Senior career*
Years	Team	Apps	(Gls)
1986–1987	Cremonese	0	(0)
1987–1990	Sassuolo	92	(7)
1990	Ospitaletto	7	(1)
1990–1991	Bologna	18	(0)
1991–1995	Brescia	122	(8)
1995–1997	Reggiana	52	(4)
1997	Bologna	27	(1)
1997–2000	Vicenza	21	(2)
2000–2002	Ternana	31	(1)
2002–2003	Ancona	16	(0)
2003–2006	Narnese	13	(0)
Total		574	(27)

Managerial career
- 2003–2006: Narnese
- 2006–2007: Sansepolcro
- 2007–2009: Deruta
- 2009: Rieti
- 2010: Deruta
- 2011: Deruta
- 2011–2013: Sporting Terni
- 2013–2014: Spoleto
- 2015–2016: Civitanovese
- 2016–2017: Sansepolcro
- 2018: Sansepolcro
- 2018–2019: Flaminia
- 2019: Ternana (youth)
- 2020–2021: Ternana (women)
- 2022–2023: Ternana (youth)
- * Club domestic league appearances and goals

Marco Schenardi (born 3 March 1968), is an Italian former professional footballer and manager, who played as a midfielder.

== Playing career ==
Schenardi started his career with Cremonese. Even without playing professionally for the club, he was part of the 1986–87 Coppa Italia Primavera champion squad. He had his first professional appearances at Sassuolo, in the 1987–88 Serie C2, where he remained until 1990 when he transferred to Ospitaletto. In November of the same year, he was bought by Bologna, making his debut in Serie A.

In 1991 he arrived at Brescia, the team that made the most appearances in his career with 122 matches, where he remained until 1995. He played in the 1995–96 season for Reggiana, and in January 1997 he returned to Bologna. In the 1997–98 season, he arrived as a reinforcement for Vicenza, who had competed in the 1997–98 UEFA Cup Winners' Cup.

Schenardi played in the last part of his career for Ternana, Ancona and Narnese, where he held the positions of player and manager.

== Managerial career ==
Schenardi became a coach while still playing for Narnese, and won the Eccellenza title with the club in 2004–05, a feat he repeated with another team from the region of Umbria, Deruta in 2007–08.

He also coached the teams of Sansepolcro, Rieti, Sporting Terni, Spoleto, Civitanovese and Flaminia, teams that were in Serie D or Eccellenza at that time. In 2019 he returned to Ternana, where he was coach of the club's U15, U17 and women's teams.

== Personal life ==
On 2 June 2023, Schenardi became sports advisor for the comune of Terni, under the management of Stefano Bandecchi.

== Honours ==
=== Player ===
Cremonese (youth)

- Coppa Italia Primavera: 1986–87

Brescia

- Serie B: 1991–92
- Anglo-Italian Cup: 1993–94

Vicenza

- Serie B: 1999–00

=== Manager ===
Narnese

- Eccellenza: 2004–05 (Umbria)
- Coppa Italia Dilettanti Umbria: 2004–05

Deruta

- Eccellenza: 2007–08 (Umbria)

Civitanovese

- Eccellenza: 2015–16 (Marche)
