= Ricardo Canals =

Uruguayan footballer (born 1970)

Personal information
- Full name: Ricardo Vicente Canals Vila
- Date of birth: 26 September 1970 (age 56)
- Place of birth: Montevideo, Uruguay
- Height: 1.82 m (6 ft 0 in)
- Position: Centre-back

Senior career*
Years	Team	Apps	(Gls)
1989–1992	Bella Vista	5	(1)
1992–1995	Nacional	12	(1)
1996–1997	CD Logroñés	28	(3)
1997–1998	Vicenza Calcio	14	(0)
1998–2002	Rosario Central	7	(1)
2003	Fénix	2	(0)

International career
1993–1995	Uruguay	4	(0)
- * Club domestic league appearances and goals

Ricardo Vicente Canals Vila (born 26 September 1970), is a Uruguayan former professional footballer who played as a centre-back.

== Career ==
Canals started his career in Bella Vista. He also played for Nacional, Huracan, Logrones, Vicenzo Calcio, Rosario Central, Fenix and the Uruguay national team.
