= Giacomo Dicara =

Italian footballer

Personal information
- Date of birth: 27 April 1970 (age 56)
- Place of birth: Spoltore, Italy
- Height: 1.83 m (6 ft 0 in)
- Position: Defender

Youth career
- 1984–1986: Pescara

Senior career*
Years	Team	Apps	(Gls)
1986–1994	Pescara	165	(6)
1990–1991	→ Bari (loan)	8	(1)
1994–1997	Perugia	91	(5)
1997–2001	Vicenza	108	(7)
2001–2002	Ternana	22	(1)
2002–2003	Ancona	23	(0)
2003–2005	Pescara	43	(0)
Total		460	(20)

International career
1989–1991	Italy U21	8	(1)

Managerial career
- 2009–2010: Benevento (assistant)
- 2010–2011: Virtus Lanciano (assistant)
- 2012–2013: Perugia (assistant)
- 2013–2015: Perugia (assistant)
- 2015–2016: Bari (assistant)
- 2016–2017: Cesena (assistant)
- 2019: Catania (assistant)
- * Club domestic league appearances and goals

Giacomo Dicara (born 27 April 1970) is an Italian former professional footballer who played as a defender.

== Career ==
Revealed by Pescara youth sectors, Dicara played for the Italy under-21 team from 1989 to 1991. He played for Pescara in 165 appearances from 1986 to 1994, and was Serie B champion in 1986–87. Dicara also had relevant spells at Perugia, Vicenza, Ternana and Ancona, always playing in the top divisions of Italian football.

After retiring as a player, Dicara worked as an assistant for some coaches, such as Andrea Camplone and Massimo Drago.

== Honours ==
Pescara

- Serie B: 1986–87

Vicenza

- Serie B: 1999–2000
