= José María Franco =

Uruguayan footballer (born 1978)

Personal information
- Full name: José María Franco Ramallo
- Date of birth: 28 September 1978 (age 48)
- Place of birth: Montevideo, Uruguay
- Height: 1.90 m (6 ft 3 in)
- Position: Striker

Senior career*
Years	Team	Apps	(Gls)
1996–1997	Central Español	34	(16)
1998–2001	Peñarol	56	(20)
2001–2004	Torino	40	(4)
2005–2006	Santiago Wanderers	19	(2)
2007–2009	Peñarol	42	(20)
2009–2011	River Plate Montevideo	15	(5)
2011	Emelec	13	(3)
2013	Fénix	13	(23)
2013–2014	Juventud Las Piedras	15	(2)

International career
2000	Uruguay U23		
2000	Uruguay	1	(0)
- * Club domestic league appearances and goals

José María Franco Ramallo (born 28 September 1978) is a Uruguayan former professional footballer who played as a striker.

== Teams ==
- (Uruguay) Central Español 1996–1997
- (Uruguay) Peñarol 1998–2001
- (Italy) Torino 2001–2004
- (Chile) Santiago Wanderers 2005–2006
- (Uruguay) Peñarol 2007–2009
- (Uruguay) River Plate de Montevideo 2009–2011
- (Ecuador) Emelec 2011
- (Uruguay) Fénix 2013
- (Uruguay) Juventud de Las Piedras 2013–2014

== Honours ==
Peñarol

- Uruguayan League: 1999
