= Gian Paolo Manighetti =

Italian footballer

Personal information
- Full name: Gian Paolo Manighetti
- Date of birth: 24 January 1969 (age 57)
- Place of birth: Filago, Italy
- Height: 1.76 m (5 ft 9 in)
- Position: Full-back

Senior career*
Years	Team	Apps	(Gls)
1986–1991	Piacenza	115	(4)
1991–1998	Bari	112	(0)
1991–1992	→ Piacenza (loan)	16	(0)
1992–1994	→ Monza (loan)	62	(1)
1998–2000	Piacenza	58	(1)
2000–2002	Sampdoria	40	(1)
2002	Cagliari	11	(0)
2003	Treviso	5	(0)
Total		419	(6)
- * Club domestic league appearances and goals

Gian Paolo Manighetti (born 24 January 1969) is an Italian former professional footballer who played as a full-back.

== Career ==
Revealed by Piacenza, Manighetti stood out for his versatility in playing in different positions in the defensive sector. He played for the club that promoted him for most of his career, being champion of the 1986 Memorial Gigi Peronace Cup, in addition to winning Serie C1 twice. He also had notable spells at Bari, who acquired him at the time for 1 million lire, Monza and Sampdoria.

After retiring as a player, Manighetti worked mainly as a talent observer in youth categories, a position he has held at Atalanta BC since July 2024.

== Honours ==
Piacenza

- Serie C1: 1986–87 (group A), 1990–91 (group A)
- Coppa Memorial Gigi Peronace: 1986
