= Davide Falcioni =

Italian footballer (born 1975)

Personal information
- Date of birth: May 19, 1975 (age 51)
- Place of birth: Fano, Italy
- Height: 1.88 m (6 ft 2 in)
- Position: Goalkeeper

Senior career*
| Years | Team | Apps | (Gls) |
| 1992–1993 | Fano | 1 | (0) |
| 1993–1994 | Parma | 0 | (0) |
| 1994–1995 | Fano | 0 | (0) |
| 1995–1996 | Olbia | 33 | (0) |
| 1996–2001 | Juventus | 1 | (0) |
| 1997 | → Treviso (loan) | 8 | (0) |
| 1998 | → Vicenza (loan) | 3 | (0) |
| 1998–1999 | → Livorno (loan) | 27 | (0) |
| 1999–2000 | → Cosenza (loan) | 0 | (0) |
| 2001–2002 | Cosenza | 3 | (0) |
| 2002–2003 | Catania | 1 | (0) |
| 2003–2004 | Real Montecchio | 4 | (0) |
| 2005–2006 | Fano | 9 | (0) |
| 2006–2007 | Pergolese | 33 | (0) |
| 2007–2008 | Vis Pesaro | 21 | (0) |
- * Club domestic league appearances and goals

Davide Falcioni (born May 19, 1975 in Fano) is an Italian former professional footballer who played as a goalkeeper.

== Honours ==
Juventus

- Serie A champion: 1996–97
