= Ronaldo Vanin =

Brazilian footballer

Personal information
- Date of birth: 31 January 1983 (age 43)
- Place of birth: São Paulo, Brazil
- Height: 1.79 m (5 ft 10 in)
- Position: Defender

Team information
- Current team: Alpignano Calcio

Youth career
- Torino

Senior career*
Years	Team	Apps	(Gls)
2002–2005	Torino	3	(0)
2003–2004	→ Benevento (loan)	17	(4)
2004–2005	→ Avellino (loan)	24	(0)
2006	Catanzaro	18	(1)
2006–2007	Perugia	10	(0)
2007	→ Manfredonia (loan)	13	(0)
2007–2012	Sorrento	89	(0)
2012–2013	Lecce	10	(1)
2013–2015	Parma	0	(0)
2013–2015	→ Gorica (loan)	37	(0)
2015	Arezzo	0	(0)
2015–2016	Sorrento		(0)
2016–2017	Casale	24	(0)
2017–	Alpignano Calcio		
- * Club domestic league appearances and goals

Ronaldo Vanin (born 31 January 1983) is a Brazilian professional footballer who plays as a defender for Alpignano Calcio.

== Career ==
Vanin started his playing career in Italy with Torino, as part of the team's youth system. He made his professional debut in the 2002–03 season, playing three Serie A games with his club before being sent out on loan to minor league teams Benevento and Avellino. Since then, he spent almost his whole career in the lower ranks of Italian football, including a season at recently relegated Serie B club US Lecce in 2012. In 2013, he left Italy to join Slovenian club ND Gorica, on loan from Parma (due to the two clubs being in a sort of partnership by the time being).

On 9 January 2015, he returned to Italy and signed a short-term contract with Lega Pro club Arezzo.
