= Davide Dionigi =

Italian footballer and manager (born 1974)

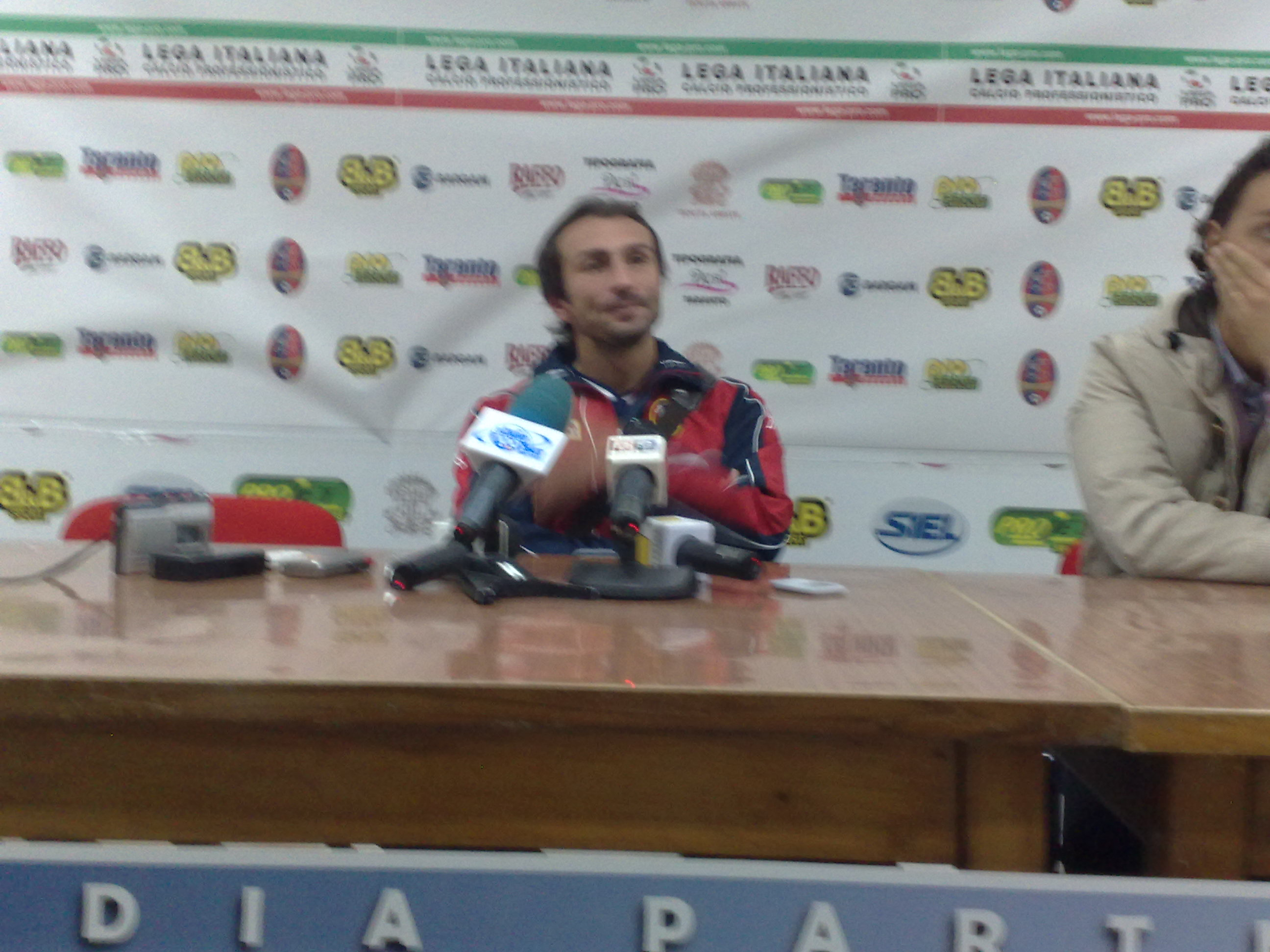

Personal information
- Date of birth: 10 January 1974 (age 52)
- Place of birth: Reggio Emilia, Italy
- Height: 1.80 m (5 ft 11 in)
- Position: Forward

Youth career
- 1990–1991: Modena

Senior career*
| Years | Team | Apps | (Gls) |
| 1991–1992 | Modena | 20 | (1) |
| 1992–1993 | Milan | 0 | (0) |
| 1993 | Vicenza | 1 | (0) |
| 1993–1994 | Como | 28 | (14) |
| 1994 | Reggiana | 7 | (0) |
| 1994–1995 | Como | 23 | (3) |
| 1995–1996 | Torino | 22 | (1) |
| 1996–1997 | Reggina | 37 | (24) |
| 1997 | Fiorentina | 2 | (0) |
| 1998–1999 | Piacenza | 59 | (13) |
| 2000 | Sampdoria | 35 | (12) |
| 2001–2002 | Reggina | 51 | (17) |
| 2002–2004 | Napoli | 63 | (27) |
| 2004–2005 | Reggina | 10 | (0) |
| 2005 | → Bari (loan) | 21 | (4) |
| 2005–2006 | → Ternana (loan) | 24 | (3) |
| 2006–2007 | → Spezia (loan) | 15 | (1) |
| 2007 | → Crotone (loan) | 11 | (0) |
| 2007–2009 | Taranto | 31 | (11) |
| 2009 | Andria BAT | 15 | (1) |

International career
| 1991–1992 | Italy U-18 | 13 | (5) |
| 1994–1995 | Italy U-21 | 7 | (5) |

Managerial career
- 2010–2012: Taranto
- 2012–2013: Reggina
- 2014: Cremonese
- 2015: Varese
- 2015: Matera
- 2017–2018: Catanzaro
- 2020: Ascoli
- 2020–2021: Brescia
- 2022: Cosenza
- 2025–2026: Reggiana
- * Club domestic league appearances and goals

Davide Dionigi (born 10 January 1974) is an Italian football coach and a former player.

== Playing career ==
Dionigi started his career at Modena and played 20 games in Serie B. He then signed for AC Milan and played on their youth team. He then transferred to Vicenza (Serie B) and left for Como in November 1993. He won promotion with Como, partially due to his 14 goals. In summer 1994, he left for Reggiana of Serie A, but in November 1994, he went on loan back to Como, this time at Serie B. In summer 1995, he signed for his third Serie A team, A.C. Torino, due to Como's relegation. In the summer of 1996, he had to search for a club again due to Torino's relegation. This time, joined Reggina of Serie B. He won the top scorer that season, and he was signed by another Serie A team Fiorentina. He played his worst Serie A start, and moved to Piacenza in October 1998, where he played two seasons. In January 2000, Piacenza sent him to Sampdoria of Serie B, but they met again six months later, due to the relegation of Piacenza, and Sampdoria missed the chance to promote. In January 2001, he re-joined Reggina, this time in Serie A to avoid relegation. But Reggina was relegated at last, but Dionigi was one of the players to help the club back to Serie A just a year later. He was dropped from the club Serie A plan, and he joined former coach Franco Colomba at Napoli of Serie B on 31 August 2002. He played in Naples until the club went bankrupt two years later. Dionigi started his third spell at Reggio Calabria since 9 July 2004. After playing another 10 Serie A games, he left on loan to Bari, Ternana, Spezia, and lastly Crotone, all of which were Serie B clubs.

In summer 2007, he joined Taranto of Serie C1, where he last played since at Como 1993–94 season.

== Managerial career ==
From 9 November 2010 until 26 June 2012, he has been the head coach of Taranto.

On 2 July 2012, he was named the new head coach of Reggina.

On 24 June 2020, he was appointed at the helm of Serie B club Ascoli. He left the club by the end of the season after guiding them to safety.

On 10 December 2020, he joined Serie B club Brescia, as the third head coach of the season for the Rondinelle. He was removed from his coaching position less than two months later, on 3 February 2021.

On 17 June 2022, Dionigi was hired by Serie B club Cosenza on a one-year contract. He was dismissed on 31 October 2022, with Cosenza on sixteenth place in the league table.

On 31 March 2025, Dionigi was appointed as the new head coach of his hometown club Reggiana. Under his tenure, he successfully managed to turn the team's fortunes and bring Reggiana out of the relegation zone, being successively confirmed in charge of the club as a consequence. On 8 February 2026, he was dismissed by Reggiana, following a streak of 8 games with only 1 point gained.

== Managerial statistics ==
As of 30 January 2021

Managerial record by team and tenure
| Team | From | To | Record | | | | | | | |
| Team | From | To | G | W | D | L | GF | GA | GD | Win % |
|---|---|---|---|---|---|---|---|---|---|---|
| Taranto | 9 November 2010 | 26 June 2012 | 63 | 30 | 24 | 9 | 71 | 42 | +29 | 47.62 |
| Reggina | 2 July 2012 | 17 March 2013 | 35 | 10 | 13 | 12 | 38 | 44 | −6 | 28.57 |
| Cremonese | 12 March 2014 | 27 May 2014 | 9 | 3 | 2 | 4 | 10 | 10 | +0 | 33.33 |
| Varese | 1 March 2015 | 9 March 2015 | 2 | 0 | 0 | 2 | 1 | 6 | −5 | 0.00 |
| Matera | 3 July 2015 | 6 October 2015 | 6 | 1 | 2 | 3 | 2 | 6 | −4 | 16.67 |
| Catanzaro | 8 October 2017 | 6 March 2018 | 20 | 6 | 4 | 10 | 18 | 26 | −8 | 30.00 |
| Ascoli | 24 June 2020 | 24 August 2020 | 9 | 4 | 2 | 3 | 13 | 13 | +0 | 44.44 |
| Brescia | 10 December 2020 | 3 February 2021 | 10 | 3 | 2 | 5 | 13 | 16 | −3 | 30.00 |
| Cosenza | 17 June 2022 | 31 October 2022 | 12 | 3 | 2 | 7 | 10 | 19 | −9 | 25.00 |
| Reggiana | 31 March 2025 | Present | 18 | 8 | 3 | 7 | 27 | 29 | −2 | 44.44 |
| Total | | | 184 | 68 | 54 | 62 | 203 | 211 | −8 | 36.96 |

== Honours an awards ==
Reggina

- Serie B third-place; promotion: 2002

Como

- Serie C1 play-offs; promotion: 1994

Individual

- Serie B top scorer: 1997
