= Fabian Valtolina =

Italian footballer

Personal information
- Full name: Fabian Natale Valtolina
- Date of birth: 10 June 1971 (age 55)
- Place of birth: Limbiate, Italy
- Height: 1.71 m (5 ft 7 in)
- Position: Midfielder

Youth career
- –1991: AC Milan

Senior career*
Years	Team	Apps	(Gls)
1991–1993	Pro Sesto	55	(10)
1993–1994	Monza	29	(7)
1994–1996	Bologna	28	(2)
1994–1995	→ Chievo (loan)	16	(2)
1996–1998	Piacenza	46	(2)
1998–2002	Venezia	112	(12)
2002–2004	Sampdoria	29	(3)
2004–2006	Pro Patria	64	(9)
2007	Legnano	13	(0)
2007	Arona		
2008	Pietrasanta		
Total		392	(47)

Managerial career
- 2009–2010: Legnano (youth)
- 2011–2012: Castiglione-Valfino
- 2013–2014: Ardor Lazzate
- 2014: Padania
- 2015–2018: Gerenzanese
- * Club domestic league appearances and goals as of 30 October 2024

Fabian Natale Valtolina (born 10 June 1971), is an Italian former professional footballer who played as a midfielder.

== Career ==
Valtolina played in AC Milan youth sectors until 1991, when he moved to Pro Sesto where he became a professional. After standing out playing in the Serie C1, he was hired by AC Monza. He later played for Bologna and Chievo in the lower divisions, until playing his first Serie A season with Piacenza in 1996–97. Valtolina also scored an important goal against AS Roma on 10 May 1998, essential for the club's stay in the top tier for the next season.

For the 1998–99 season, he was hired by Venezia, the team he played most during his career with 112 appearances in total, being promoted in 2000–01 Serie B, a feat he had already achieved with Bologna as a substitute and would later achieve for the third time. time with UC Sampdoria. Vatolina later played for Pro Patria and Legnano, in addition to Arona and Pietrasanta in Eccellenza.

== Managerial career ==
In February 2009 Valtolina had his first experience as a coach, in the youth sectors of AC Legnano. He later coached Castiglione-Valfino in Promozione and Ardor Lazzate in Eccellenza.

On 16 May 2014 he was announced by Padania as coach for the CONIFA World Cup. His last job as manager was at Gerenzanese in the Seconda Categoria.

== Personal life ==
During the COVID-19 pandemic, Valtolina started working as a property guard.

== Honours ==
Bologna

- Serie B: 1995–96

Legnano

- Serie C2: 2006–07 (group A)
