= Gianluca Lamacchi =

Italian footballer

Personal information
- Date of birth: 28 January 1972 (age 54)
- Place of birth: Bolzano, Italy
- Height: 1.78 m (5 ft 10 in)
- Position: Right-back

Youth career
- –1986: Inter Club Bolzano
- 1986–1988: Siena

Senior career*
Years	Team	Apps	(Gls)
1988–1989	Siena	2	(0)
1989–1991	Verona	5	(0)
1991	Siena	2	(0)
1991–1992	Licata	25	(0)
1993–1995	Verona	62	(2)
1995–1996	Fidelis Andria	24	(0)
1996–1998	Pescara	53	(0)
1998–2003	Piacenza	119	(1)
2003–2006	Genoa	43	(0)
2003–2004	→ Como (loan)	34	(0)
Total		369	(3)
- * Club domestic league appearances and goals

Gianluca Lamacchi (born 28 January 1972), is an Italian former professional footballer who played as a right-back. Having starting with Siena, he played most of his career for Pescara, Piacenza and Genoa, the latter from 2003 until his 2006 retirement.
