= Gianpiero Piovani =

Italian footballer and manager

Personal information
- Date of birth: 12 June 1968 (age 58)
- Place of birth: Orzinuovi, Lombardy, Italy
- Height: 1.72 m (5 ft 8 in)
- Position: Striker

Team information
- Current team: AS Roma Women (manager)

Senior career*
Years	Team	Apps	(Gls)
1985–1986	Brescia Calcio	13	(1)
1986–1987	Parma F.C.	30	(4)
1987–1988	Brescia Calcio	22	(0)
1988–1989	Cagliari Calcio	30	(3)
1989–1990	Brescia Calcio	31	(1)
1990–2001	Piacenza Calcio	341	(57)
2001–2003	Livorno Calcio	45	(5)
2003–2004	S.S.D. Sporting Lucchese	26	(2)
2004	A.C. Lumezzane	10	(1)
2004–2005	A.C. Chiari	24	(7)
2005–2006	U.S. Ivrea Calci	41	(1)
2006–2008	A.C. Rodengo Saiano	44	(9)
2008–2009	Nuova Verolese Calcio	19	(5)

International career
2009	Padania national football team	2	(1)

Managerial career
- 2009–2010: Nuova Verolese Calcio
- 2010–2011: A.C. Rodengo Saiano
- 2011–2012: U.S. Darfo Boario S.S.D.
- 2013: Casteisangiorgio
- 2013–2014: Feralpisalò Allievi Naz.
- 2015–2017: Feralpisalò Berretti
- 2017–2018: Brescia Women
- 2018–2024: Sassuolo Women
- 2024–2026: Inter Milan Women
- 2026–: AS Roma Women
- * Club domestic league appearances and goals

Gianpiero Piovani (born 12 January June 1968) is an Italian professional football manager and former player who is the current head coach of Serie A club AS Roma Women. He played as a forward.

== Club career ==
Piovani was born in Orzinuovi. His long football career began in the 1985–86 season, when, although he was still very young, he joined Brescia Calcio and played 13 matches. He then moved to Parma F.C., which had just returned to B under Arrigo Sacchi. He was trained by the famous coach one year long and had 30 appearances and shot 4 goals. When the coach went A.C. Milan Piovani returned to Brescia. He was then fetched by coach Claudio Ranieri to Cagliari Calcio, where he helped to promote to Serie B.

Piovani played for Piacenza Calcio between 1990 and 2001. In this period Piacenza achieved its best so far: 12th in the 1997–98 Serie A season.

== International career ==
In 2009 Piovani was capped for the first time for the Padania national football team, which hosted the VIVA World Cup. On 22 June 2009, he achieved the winning goal in his first international match.

== Coaching career ==
After his retirement, in the 2009–10 season he became the manager of Nuova Verolese Calcio.

In the 2010–11 season, he became the head coach of A.C. Rodengo Saiano, in place of resigning Paolo Rodolfi, in the Lega Pro Seconda Divisione Group A.

In the 2011–12 season, he became the head coach of Darfo Boario until the end of the season.

In July 2024, Piovani became manager of Inter Milan Women. On 23 June 2026, he left the club.

On 4 July 2026, Piovani was announced as manager of AS Roma Women, signing a two year contract with the club.
