= Alessandro Mazzola (footballer, born 1969) =

Italian footballer and manager

Personal information
- Date of birth: 15 June 1969 (age 57)
- Place of birth: Varese, Italy
- Height: 1.82 m (6 ft 0 in)
- Position: Midfielder

Team information
- Current team: Hellas Verona (team manager)

Youth career
- –1982: US Malnatese
- 1982–1986: Pro Patria
- 1986–1987: Torino

Senior career*
Years	Team	Apps	(Gls)
1985–1986	Pro Patria	1	(0)
1986–1987	Torino	0	(0)
1987–1992	Varese	133	(4)
1992–1994	Catanzaro	62	(3)
1995–1997	Reggiana	74	(1)
1997–2000	Piacenza	82	(1)
2000–2007	Hellas Verona	203	(3)
2007–2009	Lugano	23	(0)
2009–2010	Domegliara	27	(0)
Total		605	(12)

Managerial career
- 2010–: Hellas Verona (team manager)
- * Club domestic league appearances and goals

Alessandro Mazzola (born 15 June 1969) is a retired Italian football player who played as a midfielder; he currently works as a team manager for one of his former clubs, Hellas Verona.

== Career ==
Mazzola grew up in the Unione Sportiva Malnatese Youth sector, and in 1982, he was acquired by Pro Patria, making his professional debut with the club during the 1985–86 season; he later moved to the Torino F.C. Youth sector. During the 1987–88 season, he moved to Varese, playing five seasons with the club in Serie C1 and Serie C2. In 1992, he moved to Catanzaro in Serie C2, remaining with the club for two seasons. At the beginning of the third season, after four appearances with the club, he was acquired by Serie A club Reggiana. He made his Serie A debut with the club during the 1994–95 Serie A season, on 27 November 1994, in a 0–0 draw against Cagliari. Although the club suffered relegation, they immediately gained Serie A promotion again, and Mazzola became a permanent member of the starting line-up. The following season, Reggiana were relegated once again, and in 1997, Mazzola moved to Piacenza. He stayed with the club for three seasons, all of which were in Serie A, helping the club to avoid relegation; he was named the club's captain during the 1998–99 season. He subsequently moved to Hellas Verona in 2000, becoming an important part of the club's midfield; he remained with the club until 2007, when he signed with Swiss Challenge League side Lugano, playing with the club for two seasons. In 2009, he returned to Italy, ending his career with Serie D side Domegliara.

== Style of play ==
Throughout his career, Mazzola played as a cautious defensive midfielder, whose primary task it was to impede and break down opposition plays, and protect the defence. He also occasionally functioned as a deep-lying playmaker for his team, but he rarely participated in attacks, in order to minimise the possibility of the defence being left uncovered.

== Honours ==
Varese

- Serie C2: 1989–90
