= Sergio Marcon =

Italian footballer

Personal information
- Date of birth: 9 November 1970 (age 55)
- Place of birth: Cormons, Italy
- Height: 1.85 m (6 ft 1 in)
- Position: Goalkeeper

Team information
- Current team: Portogruaro

Youth career
- 1987–1989: Sampdoria

Senior career*
Years	Team	Apps	(Gls)
1989–1990	Teramo	6	(0)
1991–1993	Fidelis Andria	20	(0)
1993–1994	Siracusa	9	(0)
1994	Udinese	4	(0)
1995–1996	Fidelis Andria	32	(0)
1996–1999	Piacenza	10	(0)
1999–2001	Chievo	67	(0)
2001–2003	Ternana	62	(0)
2003–2004	Ancona	18	(0)
2004–2005	Chievo	2	(0)
2005–2006	Vicenza	9	(0)
2006–?	Portogruaro	33	(0)
- * Club domestic league appearances and goals as of 1 July 2007

Sergio Marcon (born 9 November 1970) is an Italian former footballer who played as a goalkeeper. He played for several Italian clubs during his career, which lasted from the 1980s to the 2000s.

== Football career ==
Born in Cormons, Marcon started his career at Sampdoria. He then played some minor clubs. He followed Fidelis Andria promoted to Serie B in summer 1992.

In summer 1994, he joined Udinese of Serie B until November 1994.

Marcon played his second spells for Fidelis Andria in Serie B until summer 1996 the club relegation.

He played for Piacenza of Serie A between 1996 until 1999, as backup of Massimo Taibi and then Matteo Sereni and Valerio Fiori. He began playing for Chievo as regular starter in Serie B in summer 1999, and won promotion in summer 2001. He played for Ternana in another two Serie B seasons, with Gianmatteo Mareggini as backup.

In summer 2003, he signed for Serie A team Ancona, where he competed with Alessio Scarpi and Magnus Hedman. After the club's relegation, he re-joined Chievo of Serie A, as backup of Luca Marchegiani.

In summer 2005, he joined Vicenza of Serie B, as backup of Giorgio Sterchele.
