= Stefano Fattori =

Italian footballer

Personal information
- Date of birth: 26 February 1972 (age 54)
- Place of birth: Verona, Italy
- Height: 1.81 m (5 ft 11 in)
- Position: Defender

Youth career
- 1990–1991: Verona

Senior career*
Years	Team	Apps	(Gls)
1991–1997	Verona	125	(0)
1991–1992	→ Virescit Bergamo (loan)	34	(0)
1992–1993	→ Salernitana (loan)	23	(2)
1997	Reggiana	3	(0)
1997–1999	Torino	63	(3)
1999–2000	Vicenza	35	(2)
2000–2003	Torino	81	(1)
2003–2004	Piacenza	42	(1)
2004–2006	Ternana	67	(2)
2006–2009	Sambonifacese	78	(7)
Total		551	(18)

Managerial career
- 2009–2010: Verona (general manager)
- 2013–2015: Sassuolo (youth)
- 2016–2017: Udinese (scout)
- 2019–2021: Cremonese (scout)
- * Club domestic league appearances and goals

Stefano Fattori (born 26 February 1972) is an Italian former professional footballer who played as a defender.

== Career ==
Revealed by Hellas Verona, Fattori stood out playing for the club, where he played for the first time in Serie A in the 1996–97 season. He also had notable spells in Torino, Vicenza and Piacenza.

After retiring as a player, Fattori became general manager at Hellas Verona. He also worked in the youth sectors at Sassuolo, in addition to the scout sectors at Udinese and Cremonese.

== Honours ==
Vicenza

- Serie B: 1999–00

Torino

- Serie B: 2000–01
