= Cleto Polonia =

Italian footballer (born 1968)

Personal information
- Date of birth: 4 September 1968 (age 58)
- Place of birth: Tolmezzo, Italy
- Height: 1.76 m (5 ft 9 in)
- Position: Defender

Youth career
- 1984–1986: Triestina

Senior career*
Years	Team	Apps	(Gls)
1986–1990	Triestina	92	(0)
1990–1993	Verona	93	(0)
1993–2000	Piacenza	187	(1)
2000–2002	Sampdoria	8	(0)
Total		380	(1)

Managerial career
- 2003–2004: Gemonese
- 2005–2006: Udinense (youth)
- 2008–2012: Arteniese
- 2017–2022: Venzone
- 2022–2024: Bujese
- * Club domestic league appearances and goals

Cleto Polonia (born 4 September 1968) is an Italian former professional footballer who played as a defender.

== Playing career ==
Polonia began his career with Triestina in the 1986–87 season. After playing for Verona for three seasons, he arrived at Piacenza, where he made 187 appearances, scored the only goal of his career, and was part of the 1994–95 Serie B champion squad. He also played for Sampdoria, after being exchanged for Vittorio Tosto, before retiring professionally.

== Managerial career ==
As a coach, Polonia took over teams that compete in the Prima and Seconda Categoria, in addition to the youth sectors of Udinese.

== Honours ==
Piacenza

- Serie B: 1994–95
