= Massimo Rastelli =

Italian football manager (born 1968)

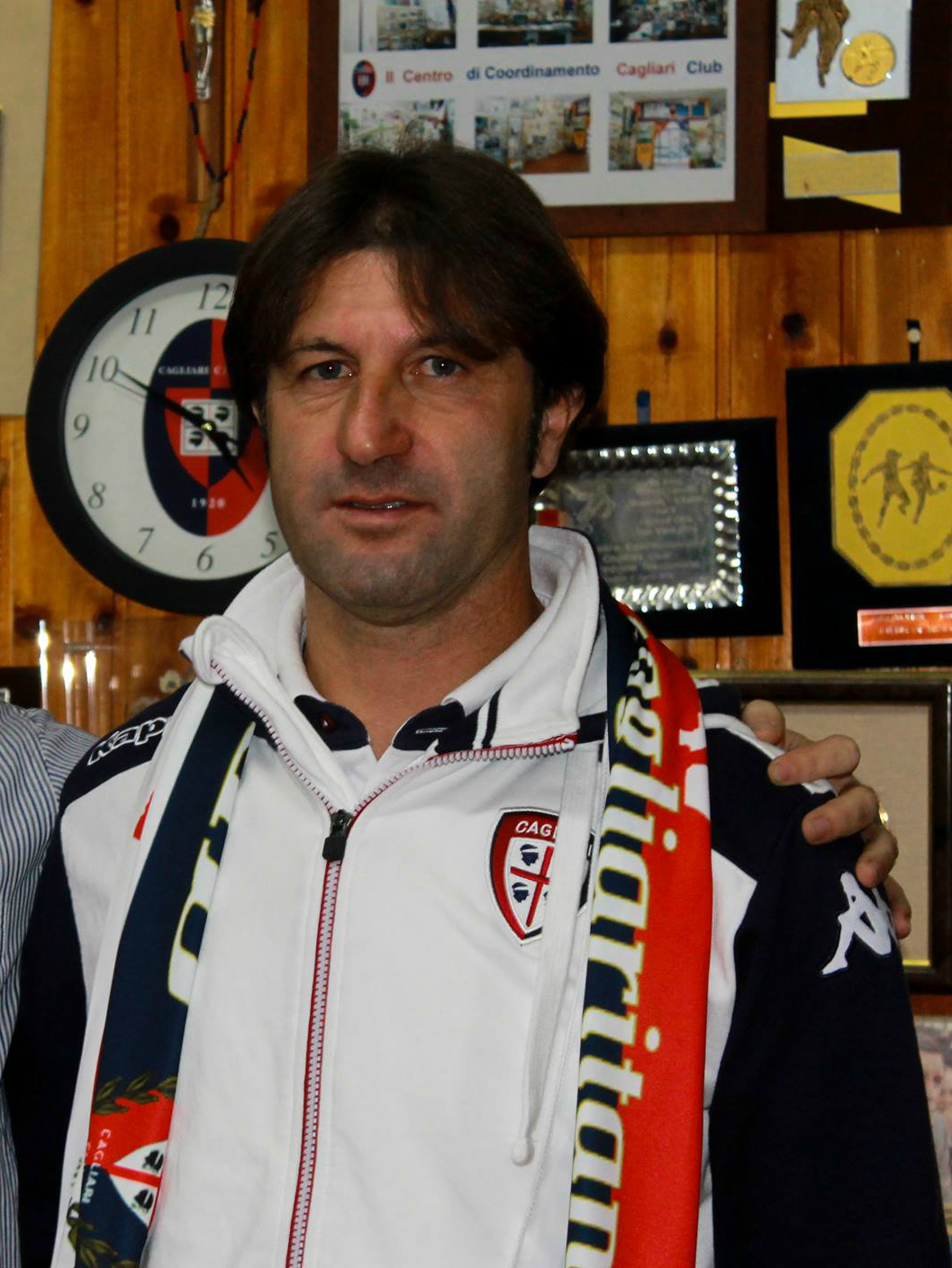

Personal information
- Full name: Massimo Rastelli
- Date of birth: 27 December 1968 (age 57)
- Place of birth: Torre del Greco, Italy
- Height: 1.74 m (5 ft 9 in)
- Position: Striker

Team information
- Current team: Bari (manager)

Senior career*
Years	Team	Apps	(Gls)
1987–1988	Solofra	27	(4)
1988–1989	Catanzaro	24	(1)
1989–1990	Mantova	31	(5)
1990–1997	Lucchese	222	(50)
1997–2001	Piacenza	116	(12)
2001–2002	Napoli	32	(6)
2002–2003	Reggina	17	(0)
2003–2004	Como	40	(3)
2004–2006	Avellino	68	(8)
2006–2008	Sorrento	58	(7)
2008–2009	Juve Stabia	13	(0)
Total		648	(96)

Managerial career
- 2009–2010: Juve Stabia
- 2010–2011: Brindisi
- 2011–2012: Portogruaro
- 2012–2015: Avellino
- 2015–2017: Cagliari
- 2018–2019: Cremonese
- 2020: Cremonese
- 2021: SPAL
- 2021: Pordenone
- 2022–2023: Avellino
- 2026–: Bari
- * Club domestic league appearances and goals

Massimo Rastelli (born 27 December 1968) is an Italian football manager and former player who played as a striker. He is the manager of Serie C Group C club Bari.

== Career ==
=== Playing ===
A second striker/winger, Rastelli started his career with Serie D club Solofra and played professionally for the first time in 1988 with Catanzaro. After a long stint with Lucchese (seven consecutive Serie B seasons), he made his Serie A debut in 1997 with Piacenza, playing four years for the Emilians. In 2001, he joined then-Serie B club Napoli, failing to win promotion to the top flight with the fallen giants. He then signed for Reggina in 2002, his final Serie A season as a player. He retired in 2009 after a season with Juve Stabia.

=== Coaching ===
He was coach of Juve Stabia in the 2009–10 season, winning promotion to the Lega Pro Prima Divisione on his first attempt. For the following season, he signed for Brindisi.

In the 2011–12 season he was the head coach of Portogruaro in Lega Pro Prima Divisione.

In the 2012–13 season he was the head coach of Avellino in Lega Pro Prima Divisione. The club won promotion to Serie B.

On 12 June 2015 Rastelli was hired by newly relegated club Cagliari for their 2015–16 Serie B season. He led Cagliari to win the Serie B title, and was consequently confirmed also for the 2016–17 Serie A campaign. He was sacked on 17 October 2017.

On 5 November 2018, Rastelli returned into management as the new head coach of Serie B club Cremonese. On 8 October 2019, Cremonese fired him with the team in 12th position in the table. On 8 January 2020, he was reinstated as head coach of Cremonese. He was dismissed as Cremonese boss for a second time on 4 March 2020, with the club languishing in the relegation zone.

On 16 March 2021, he was hired by Serie B club SPAL until the end of the 2020–21 season, with an option to extend the contract for another season. He left the club at the end of the season.

On 31 August 2021 he was named new head coach of Serie B club Pordenone. He was however dismissed himself on 16 October 2021, with Pordenone lying at the bottom of the league table, as he failed to turn the club's fortunes.

On 20 October 2022, Rastelli returned to Avellino, signing a two-year contract with the Serie C club, with a further two-year extension in case of promotion to Serie B. He was dismissed on 12 September 2023, after suffering two defeats in the first two games of the 2023–24 Serie C season.

== Managerial statistics ==
As of match played 12 February 2023

Managerial record by team and tenure
Team	Nat	From	To	Record								Ref
Team	Nat	From	To	G	W	D	L	GF	GA	GD	Win %	Ref
Juve Stabia	(Italy)	22 June 2009	29 May 2010	40	25	8	7	71	31	+40	62.50	
Brindisi	(Italy)	13 October 2010	1 July 2011	23	3	7	13	13	35	−22	13.04	
Portogruaro	(Italy)	18 July 2011	17 May 2012	36	10	12	14	41	50	−9	27.78	
Avellino	(Italy)	21 May 2012	12 June 2015	130	57	36	37	161	132	+29	43.85	
Cagliari	(Italy)	12 June 2015	17 October 2017	95	44	15	36	152	140	+12	46.32	
Cremonese	(Italy)	5 November 2018	8 October 2019	35	15	8	12	39	35	+4	42.86	
Cremonese	(Italy)	8 January 2020	4 March 2020	9	1	3	5	13	16	−3	11.11	
SPAL	(Italy)	16 March 2021	28 June 2021	9	4	2	3	10	10	+0	44.44	
Pordenone	(Italy)	31 August 2021	16 October 2021	6	0	1	5	5	16	−11	0.00	
Avellino	(Italy)	20 October 2022	12 September 2023	20	8	8	4	29	21	+8	40.00	
Total				403	167	100	136	534	486	+48	41.44	—

== Honours ==
=== Player ===
Sorrento

- Serie C2: 2006–07
- Supercoppa di Lega Serie C2: 2007

=== Manager ===
Avellino

- Lega Pro Prima Divisione: 2012–13
- Supercoppa di Lega di Prima Divisione: 2013

Cagliari

- Serie B: 2015–16

Juve Stabia

- Lega Pro Seconda Divisione: 2009–10
