= Marco Ferrante =

Italian footballer

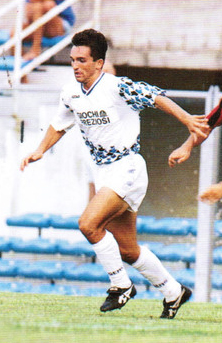
- Ferrante in 1991 with Pisa

Personal information
- Date of birth: 4 February 1971 (age 55)
- Place of birth: Velletri, Italy
- Height: 1.76 m (5 ft 9 in)
- Position: Striker

Team information
- Current team: Messina (general manager)

Senior career*
Years	Team	Apps	(Gls)
1988–1992	Napoli	1	(0)
1990–1991	→ Reggiana (loan)	25	(5)
1991–1992	→ Pisa (loan)	37	(13)
1992–1993	Parma	11	(0)
1993–1994	Piacenza	27	(4)
1994–1995	Perugia	33	(3)
1995–1996	Salernitana	30	(6)
1996–2004	Torino	232	(114)
2001	→ Inter Milan (loan)	11	(1)
2004	Catania	19	(5)
2005	Bologna	6	(0)
2005–2006	Ascoli	26	(8)
2006–2007	Pescara	15	(1)
2007	Hellas Verona	18	(3)

International career
1992	Italy U21	1	(0)
- * Club domestic league appearances and goals

Marco Ferrante (born 4 February 1971) is an Italian former professional footballer who played as a forward. With 125 total goals scored for Torino, he is the fifth-highest scorer in the history of the Torinese club behind Guglielmo Gabetto (127) and ahead of Valentino Mazzola (123).

== Club career ==
After spending his youth career with Napoli, Ferrante made his Serie A debut with the club's senior side against Como on 25 June 1989, winning the 1989–90 Serie A title with the team the following season. He subsequently spend two seasons in Serie B with Reggiana and Pisa, scoring 13 goals during the 1991–92 Serie B season. After returning to Napoli in 1992, he moved to Parma in November on a co-ownership deal. The following season, Napoli sold him to newly promoted Serie A side Piacenza. He spent the next two seasons at Perugia, and Serie B side Salernitana, respectively.

Ferrante is most famous for the eight years he spent with Torino, after moving to the club in 1996. During his time in Turin, he became one of the club's all-time top goal-scorers, especially thanks to his goal-scoring tally in Serie B. He scored 27 goals during the 1998–99 season, which earned him the title of Serie B top-scorer, and also helped the club to gain Serie A promotion, although they were immediately relegated back to Serie B the following season. His Serie A record tally was ten goals with Torino during the 2001–02 season, when he came back to the club following a brief stint on loan at Inter Milan in 2001 where he played 11 games and scored once against Udinese, helping Torino qualify for the 2002 UEFA Intertoto Cup. During that season, he notably scored a goal in the Derby della Mole return leg, against local rivals and eventual champions Juventus, celebrating the goal by mimicking "Bull-horns" with his hands (the bull is the symbol of the Torino side, as it is the city's coat of arms; the club is also known in its contracted form as "Toro", which means bull in Italian). Juventus midfielder Enzo Maresca attracted controversy later in the match when he imitated Ferrante's celebration following his late equaliser, as the match ended 2–2. He remained with the club in 2004, after scoring 114 goals for the club over 235 league matches in Serie A and Serie B.

He moved to Catania in 2004, spending half a season with the club before being sold to Bologna, under manager Carlo Mazzone, although he was unable to save the club from relegation to Serie B. He spent his final season in Serie A with Ascoli, scoring eight goals. He retired at the conclusion of the 2006–07 Serie B season, spending half the season with Pescara, and the rest with Verona, who were relegated to Serie C1 at the end of the season. As of the conclusion of the 2005–06 Serie A season, Ferrante played 172 Serie A games and scored 48 goals. He also played 290 Serie B games and scored 111 goals.

== International career ==
Ferrante made one appearance with the Italy national under-21 football team in 1992, in a friendly match against Egypt on 10 July. He was included in the Italian squad that took part at the 1992 Summer Olympic games in Barcelona, but he failed to make appearance throughout the tournament. He was never capped for Italy at senior level.

== Post-playing career ==
After retirement, he became a football agent. In June 2019, he was appointed general manager of Serie D club Messina.

== Honours ==
Napoli

- UEFA Cup: 1988–89
- Serie A: 1989–90

Parma

- European Cup Winners' Cup: 1992–93

Individual

- Serie B top scorer: 1998–99
