= Pasquale Luiso =

Italian footballer and coach

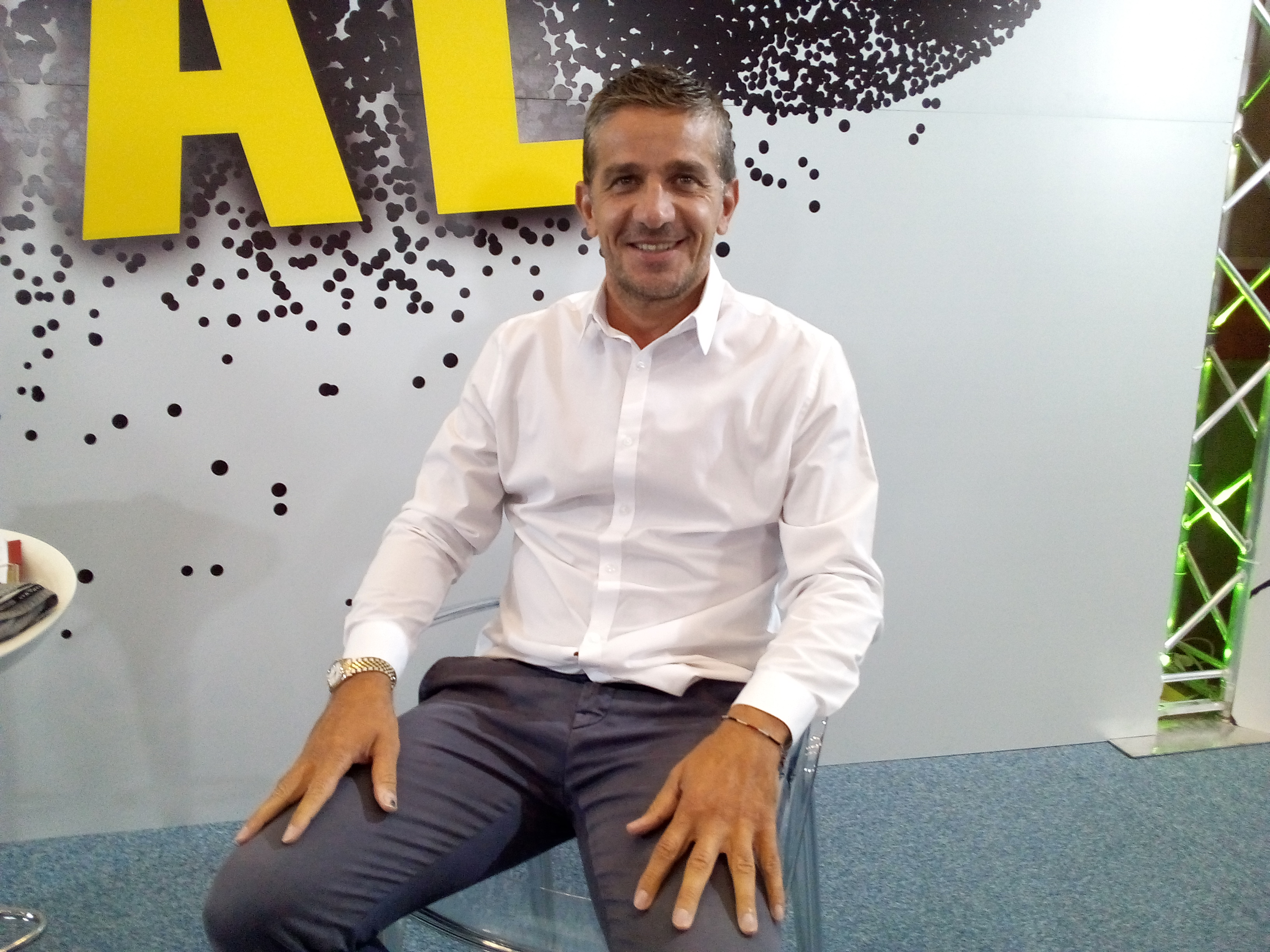

Personal information
- Date of birth: 30 October 1969 (age 56)
- Place of birth: Naples, Italy
- Height: 1.77 m (5 ft 10 in)
- Position: Forward

Team information
- Current team: Chieti (head coach)

Senior career*
Years	Team	Apps	(Gls)
1986–1990	Afragolese	78	(8)
1990–1994	Sora	121	(58)
1994–1995	Torino	1	(0)
1994–1995	→ Pescara (loan)	21	(7)
1995–1996	Chievo	0	(0)
1995–1996	→ Avellino (loan)	36	(19)
1996–1997	Piacenza	31	(14)
1997–2001	Vicenza	86	(24)
1999	→ Pescara (loan)	15	(2)
2001–2002	Sampdoria	47	(13)
2002–2004	Ancona	13	(2)
2003	→ Salernitana (loan)	10	(2)
2004–2005	Catanzaro	11	(0)
2005	Sora	12	(2)
2005–2007	Teramo	32	(6)
2007	Celano Olimpia	10	(6)
2007	Priverno	2	(0)
2007–2008	Sora	15	(12)
Total		541	(175)

Managerial career
- 2010–2011: Sora
- 2013–2014: Sulmona
- 2014: Triestina
- 2014–2015: Celano
- 2018: Racing Fondi
- 2024–: Chieti
- * Club domestic league appearances and goals

Pasquale Luiso (born 30 October 1969) is an Italian football coach and former player who works as head coach of Serie D club Chieti. A forward, he notably reached the semi-finals of the UEFA Cup Winners' Cup with Vicenza.

== Playing career ==
Luiso was born in Naples, Italy. He spent several years in amateur leagues before being picked up by Torino in 1994. Playing just one game for the club, he was loaned out to Pescara before being sold to Chievo, who in turn loaned him out to Avellino, where a successful 1995–96 season saw him being picked up by Serie A minnows Piacenza.

During Luiso's only season at Piacenza, he was a revelation in the top flight, netting 14 goals, among them a winning goal against reigning champions Milan. Piacenza beat Cagliari in a relegation playoff, which was a successful end for Luiso at the club since he was bought by Coppa Italia winners Vicenza. During a four-year stint with the club, save for a short stint at Pescara. Luiso struck 24 league goals for Vicenza but was relegated twice with the club. He did, however, help the team to the semi-finals of the UEFA Cup Winners' Cup during his first season with the club, finishing the competition as the top scorer, also later helping Vicenza to re-obtain Serie A promotion by winning the 1999–2000 Serie B title.

Following the second relegation, Sampdoria signed Luiso, who scored 13 goals in 47 Serie B fixtures for the club. Before Sampdoria's promotion season, Luiso was sold to Ancona, where he contributed to their promotion instead, even though he spent the spring on loan at Salernitana. Following a mere three Serie A fixtures in Ancona's disastrous season, before a short spell at Catanzaro in 2004, Luiso's professional career ended.

Following Catanzaro, Luiso spent some time playing for former club Sora, among other amateur clubs, before retiring at the age of 39 in 2008.

== Managerial career ==
Luiso served as the head coach of Sora in the Italian Eccellenza division from 2010 to December 2011. He then briefly served in 2018 as head coach of Serie C club Racing Fondi.

In June 2022, Luiso took a role as youth coach of Juve Stabia.

On 27 February 2024, Luiso was hired as the new head coach of Serie D club Chieti.

== Honours ==
Vicenza

- Serie B: 1999–2000

Individual

- UEFA Cup Winners' Cup Top Scorer: 1997–98
