= Arturo Di Napoli =

Italian footballer and coach (born 1974)

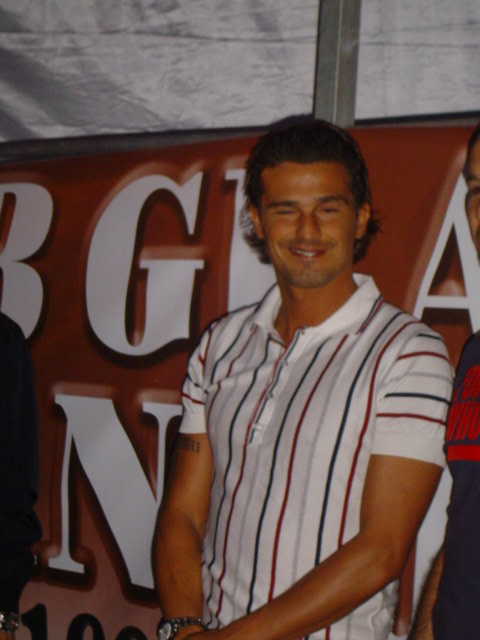

Personal information
- Date of birth: 18 April 1974 (age 52)
- Place of birth: Milan, Italy
- Height: 1.77 m (5 ft 9 1/2 in)
- Position: Forward

Team information
- Current team: Cologno (head coach)

Youth career
- Acireale

Senior career*
Years	Team	Apps	(Gls)
1993–1994	Acireale	21	(0)
1994–1995	Gualdo	31	(28)
1995–1997	Napoli	28	(5)
1997	Inter	6	(0)
1997–1999	Vicenza	25	(6)
1998–1999	→ Empoli (loan)	25	(11)
1999–2000	Piacenza	18	(4)
2000–2002	Venezia	60	(50)
2002–2003	Palermo	30	(8)
2003–2007	Messina	126	(43)
2007–2008	Siena	0	(2)
2007–2008	→ Salernitana (loan)	32	(21)
2008–2009	Salernitana	37	(13)
2009–2010	Messina	32	(30)
2010	Venezia	11	(2)
2010–2012	Caronnese	44	(27)

Managerial career
- 2012: Rieti
- 2013: Riccione
- 2014: Savona
- 2015: Vittoriosa Stars
- 2015–2016: Messina
- 2018–: Cologno
- * Club domestic league appearances and goals

Arturo Di Napoli (born 18 April 1974) is an Italian football coach and former player, who played as a striker. He is currently head coach of Italian amateurs Cologno.

== Playing career ==
=== From Empoli to Messina ===
Di Napoli started his career in minor Italian clubs, before being picked up by Napoli when Freddy Rincón's loan deal expired. Di Napoli scored five times for the Neapolitans, before being sold to Internazionale, where he was unable to make an impact.

In 1998, he was signed by Empoli on loan. In June 1999, he was signed by Piacenza for 7 billion Italian lire.

In January 2005, his contract with Messina was extended to summer 2008.

=== From Salernitana to Messina ===
After Messina went bankrupt, Siena signed him on free transfer and loaned him to Salernitana. He guided the Campanian side to promotion in the Italian Serie B, and was acquired half of the registration rights in July 2008. In his Serie B season with Salernitana, he provided 13 goals, being instrumental into guiding his side into their relegation escape.

In September 2009, he left Salernitana by mutual consent in order to return to Messina, joining the giallorossi, now in Serie D, on a free transfer with the aim to guide them back into professionalism.

=== From Venezia to Caronnese ===
The forward joined in summer 2010 from Italian Serie D football team Messina to Venezia. He played in the first half of the season 11 games and scored two goals for Venezia before joined on 2 December 2010 to Caronnese.

== Coaching career ==
After his retirement, Di Napoli took his first full coaching role in July 2012 at amateurs Rieti of Eccellenza Lazio, then resigning later in November 2012 for personal reasons. In August 2013 he took the reins of Serie D club Riccione, resigning in December 2013 due to financial issues.

On 26 July 2014 he was named new head coach of Lega Pro club Savona.

Di Napoli undertook his first move abroad in late 2014, when on 31 January 2014, he signed for Maltese club Vittoriosa Stars, in view of the 2015 remaining season.

He was successively named head coach of Serie D club Messina in August 2015, but was forced to quit in February 2016 after being disqualified for four years due to his involvement in the 2015 Italian football scandal. His sentence was then reduced to 3 years and 6 months on appeal. In December 2017, he was acquitted from all charges on the related criminal trial (unrelated to the sports trial). His disqualification ended officially on 12 July 2019, on which day he announced he was in talks to become head coach of amateur club Cologno. He was formally announced as new Cologno coach, in the Prima Categoria league, on 8 September 2018.
