= Daniele Delli Carri =

Italian footballer (born 1971)

Personal information
- Date of birth: 18 September 1971 (age 55)
- Place of birth: Foggia, Italy
- Height: 1.83 m (6 ft 0 in)
- Position: Defender

Senior career*
Years	Team	Apps	(Gls)
1988–1990	Bisceglie	17	(1)
1990–1994	Torino	6	(0)
1991–1992	→ Lucchese (loan)	18	(0)
1992–1993	→ Lucchese (loan)	31	(0)
1994–1996	Genoa	42	(2)
1996–2000	Piacenza	93	(3)
2000–2003	Torino	87	(2)
2003–2004	Siena	15	(0)
2004–2005	Fiorentina	36	(1)
2005–2007	Pescara	56	(1)
2007–2008	Foggia	6	(0)
2008	Lanciano	5	(0)

International career
1993–1994	Italy U-21	8	(0)
1993	Italy U-23	2	(0)
Medal record
Association football
Representing Italy
UEFA European Under-21 Championship
Winner	1994 France
- * Club domestic league appearances and goals

Daniele Delli Carri (born 18 September 1971) is a retired Italian footballer who played as a defender.

== Personal life ==
His son Filippo Delli Carri is now a professional footballer.

== Honours ==
=== Club ===
Genoa

- Anglo-Italian Cup winner: 1995–96

Torino

- Serie B champion: 2000–01

=== International ===
Italy U21

- UEFA European Under-21 Championship winner: 1994
