= 1991–92 SS Lazio season =

Lazio
1991–92 season
- Owner: Gianmarco Calleri (until 12 March 1992); Sergio Cragnotti
- President: Gianmarco Calleri (until 12 March 1992); Sergio Cragnotti
- Manager: Dino Zoff
- Stadium: Stadio Olimpico
- Serie A: 10th
- Coppa Italia: Round of 16
- Top goalscorer: League: Rubén Sosa; Karl-Heinz Riedle (13); All: Rubén Sosa (16)
| Home colours | Away colours |

The 1991–92 season was Società Sportiva Lazio's 92nd season since the club's existence and their fourth consecutive season in the top-flight of Italian football. In this season, Lazio finished in 10th in Serie A and reached the round of 16 in the Coppa Italia. The most significant event was that Sergio Cragnotti, took charge of the club on 20 February 1992, which reignited the club as a force on the transfer market.

== Squad ==
Note: Flags indicate national team as defined under FIFA eligibility rules; some limited exceptions apply. Players may hold more than one non-FIFA nationality.

| Pos. | Nation | Player |
|---|---|---|
| GK | ITA | Valerio Fiori |
| GK | ITA | Fernando Orsi |
| GK | ITA | Flavio Roma |
| DF | ITA | Cristiano Bergodi |
| DF | ITA | Luigi Corino |
| DF | ITA | Angelo Gregucci |
| DF | ITA | Davide Lampugnani |
| DF | ITA | Raffaele Sergio |
| DF | ITA | Roberto Soldà |
| DF | ITA | Rufo Emiliano Verga |
| DF | ITA | Claudio Vertova |
| MF | ITA | Roberto Bacci |

| Pos. | Nation | Player |
|---|---|---|
| MF | GER | Thomas Doll |
| MF | ITA | Armando Madonna |
| MF | ITA | Alessandro Manetti |
| MF | ITA | Franco Marchegiani |
| MF | ITA | Stefano Melchiori |
| MF | ITA | Gabriele Pin |
| MF | ITA | Claudio Sclosa |
| MF | ITA | Giovanni Stroppa |
| FW | GER | Karl-Heinz Riedle |
| FW | URU | Rubén Sosa |
| FW | ITA | Maurizio Neri |
| FW | ITA | Berardino Capocchiano |

=== Transfers ===
In
| Pos. | Name | from | Type |
|---|---|---|---|
| MF | Thomas Doll | Hamburger SV | |
| MF | Giovanni Stroppa | AC Milan | |
| DF | Luigi Corino | US Triestina | |
| DF | Rufo Emiliano Verga | Bologna | |
| MF | Alessandro Manetti | Mantova | loan ended |
| MF | Stefano Melchiori | AC Reggiana | |
| FW | Berardino Capocchiano | TSV Havelse | |
| FW | Maurizio Neri | Pisa SC | |

Out
| Pos. | Name | To | Type |
|---|---|---|---|
| MF | Pedro Troglio | Ascoli FC | |
| MF | Sergio Domini | Brescia Calcio | |
| FW | Alessandro Bertoni | AC Reggiana | |
| FW | Giampaolo Saurini | Brescia Calcio | |

==== Winter ====
In
| Pos. | Name | from | Type |

Out
| Pos. | Name | To | Type |
|---|---|---|---|
| DF | Davide Lampugnani | Messina | |
| MF | Franco Marchegiani | Pisa | |
| FW | Armando Madonna | Piacenza Calcio | loan |

== Competitions ==
=== Serie A ===
==== League table ====
| Pos | Team | Pld | W | D | L | GF | GA | GD | Pts |
|---|---|---|---|---|---|---|---|---|---|
| 8 | Internazionale | 34 | 10 | 17 | 7 | 28 | 28 | 0 | 37 |
| 9 | Foggia | 34 | 12 | 11 | 11 | 58 | 58 | 0 | 35 |
| 10 | Lazio | 34 | 11 | 12 | 11 | 43 | 40 | +3 | 34 |
| 11 | Atalanta | 34 | 10 | 14 | 10 | 31 | 33 | −2 | 34 |
| 12 | Fiorentina | 34 | 10 | 12 | 12 | 44 | 41 | +3 | 32 |

Source: 1991–92 Serie A, RSSSF.com
Rules for classification: 1) Points; 2) Head-to-head points; 3) Head-to-head goal difference; 4) Goal difference; 5) Goals scored; 6) Draw.

==== Results by round ====
| Round | 1 | 2 | 3 | 4 | 5 | 6 | 7 | 8 | 9 | 10 | 11 | 12 | 13 | 14 | 15 | 16 | 17 | 18 | 19 | 20 | 21 | 22 | 23 | 24 | 25 | 26 | 27 | 28 | 29 | 30 | 31 | 32 | 33 | 34 |
|---|---|---|---|---|---|---|---|---|---|---|---|---|---|---|---|---|---|---|---|---|---|---|---|---|---|---|---|---|---|---|---|---|---|---|
| Ground | H | A | H | A | H | A | H | A | H | A | A | H | A | H | H | A | H | A | H | A | H | A | H | A | H | A | H | H | A | H | A | A | H | A |
| Result | D | W | D | W | L | D | D | W | D | W | D | D | L | D | W | L | W | L | W | L | D | L | D | L | W | D | W | D | L | W | L | L | L | W |
| Position | 10 | 5 | 6 | 1 | 7 | 10 | 8 | 3 | 4 | 4 | 4 | 4 | 4 | 4 | 4 | 5 | 4 | 7 | 4 | 6 | 6 | 8 | 8 | 10 | 9 | 9 | 7 | 7 | 8 | 6 | 9 | 11 | 11 | 10 |

Source: Competitive matches
A = Away; H = Home; W = Win; D = Draw; L = Loss; = Leader, 1993–94 UEFA Champions League; = 1992–93 UEFA Cup; = 1992–93 Serie B

==== Matches ====
| 1 September 1991 1 | Lazio | 1–1 | Parma | Rome |
| | Nava 63' (o.g.) | Report | Osio 89' | Stadium: Stadio Olimpico; Attendance: 37,384; Referee: Carlo Sguizzato |

| 8 September 1991 2 | Torino | 0–1 | Lazio | Turin |
| | | Report | Sosa 76' | Stadium: Stadio delle Alpi; Attendance: 33,520; Referee: Fabio Baldas |

| 15 September 1991 3 | Lazio | 1–1 | Atalanta | Rome |
| | Sosa 14' | Report | Caniggia 55' | Stadium: Stadio Olimpico; Attendance: 35,189; Referee: Maurizio Mughetti |

| 22 September 1991 4 | Ascoli | 1–4 | Lazio | Ascoli Piceno |
| | Giordano 54' | Report | Doll 13'; Sosa 56', 59'; Bergodi 85' | Stadium: Stadio Cino e Lillo Del Duca; Attendance: 13,050; Referee: Marcello Nicchi |

| 29 September 1991 5 | Lazio | 0–1 | Internazionale | Rome |
| | | Report | R. Ferri 1' | Stadium: Stadio Olimpico; Attendance: 51,646; Referee: Tullio Lanese |

| 6 October 1991 6 | Roma | 1–1 | Lazio | Rome |
| | Rizzitelli 81' | Report | Riedle 65' | Stadium: Stadio Olimpico; Attendance: 63,281; Referee: Gianni Beschin |

| 20 October 1991 7 | Lazio | 1–1 | Genoa | Rome |
| | Pin 35' | Report | Aguilera 82' | Stadium: Stadio Olimpico; Attendance: 32,462; Referee: Pierluigi Pairetto |

| 27 October 1991 8 | Hellas Verona | 0–2 | Lazio | Verona |
| | | Report | Riedle 44'; Riedle 67' | Stadium: Stadio Marcantonio Bentegodi; Attendance: 21,243; Referee: Walter Cinciripini |

| 3 November 1991 9 | Lazio | 1–1 | Juventus | Rome |
| | Riedle 72' | Report | Alessio 45' | Stadium: Stadio Olimpico; Attendance: 61,942; Referee: Arcangelo Pezzella |

| 17 November 1991 10 | Bari | 1–2 | Lazio | Bari |
| | Platt 43' | Report | Doll 39'; Riedle 74' | Stadium: Stadio San Nicola; Attendance: 37,226; Referee: Pietro D'Elia |

| 24 November 1991 11 | Fiorentina | 1–1 | Lazio | Florence |
| | Orlando 27' | Report | Sosa 71' (pen.) | Stadium: Stadio Comunale; Attendance: 29,023; Referee: Carlo Sguizzato |

| 1 December 1991 12 | Lazio | 3–3 | Napoli | Rome |
| | Riedle 25', 57'; Sosa 68' (pen.) | Report | Ferrara 43'; Blanc 79'; Zola 90' | Stadium: Stadio Olimpico; Attendance: 40,562; Referee: Werther Cornieti |

| 8 December 1991 13 | Cremonese | 2–0 | Lazio | Cremona |
| | Dezotti 51'; Florijančič 79' | Report | | Stadium: Stadio Giovanni Zini; Attendance: 6,291; Referee: Tullio Lanese |

| 15 December 1991 14 | Lazio | 1–1 | Milan | Rome |
| | Riedle 51' | Report | van Basten 54' | Stadium: Stadio Olimpico; Attendance: 51,630; Referee: Piero Ceccarini |

| 5 January 1992 15 | Lazio | 5–2 | Foggia | Rome |
| | Doll 12'; Riedle 16', 38'; Stroppa 81'; Sergio 83' | Report | Shalimov 12', 21' | Stadium: Stadio Olimpico; Attendance: 41,502; Referee: Carlo Sguizzato |

| 12 January 1992 16 | Sampdoria | 1–0 | Lazio | Genoa |
| | Vialli 6' | Report | | Stadium: Stadio Luigi Ferraris; Attendance: 29,826; Referee: Fabio Baldas |

| 19 January 1992 17 | Lazio | 2–1 | Cagliari | Rome |
| | Doll 4'; Sosa 49' | Report | Napoli 59' | Stadium: Stadio Olimpico; Attendance: 34,892; Referee: Angelo Amendolia |

| 26 January 1992 18 | Parma | 1–0 | Lazio | Parma |
| | Brolin 42' | Report | | Stadium: Stadio Ennio Tardini; Attendance: 21,866; Referee: Loris Stafoggia |

| 2 February 1992 19 | Lazio | 2–1 | Torino | Rome |
| | Sosa 28' (pen.); Sclosa 41' | Report | Annoni 39' | Stadium: Stadio Olimpico; Attendance: 37,172; Referee: Robert Boggi |

| 9 February 1992 20 | Atalanta | 1–0 | Lazio | Bergamo |
| | Strömberg 66' | Report | | Stadium: Stadio Comunale; Attendance: 18,214; Referee: Arcangelo Pezzella |

| 16 February 1992 21 | Lazio | 1–1 | Ascoli | Rome |
| | Stroppa 60' | Report | Benetti 89' | Stadium: Stadio Olimpico; Attendance: 29,012; Referee: Marcello Cardona |

| 23 February 1992 22 | Internazionale | 1–0 | Lazio | Milan |
| | Matthäus 24' (pen.) | Report | | Stadium: San Siro; Attendance: 41,394; Referee: Rosario Lo Bello |

| 1 March 1992 23 | Lazio | 1–1 | Roma | Rome |
| | Sosa 5' | Report | Häßler 70' | Stadium: Stadio Olimpico; Attendance: 59,458; Referee: Loris Stafoggia |

| 8 March 1992 24 | Genoa | 1–0 | Lazio | Genoa |
| | Skuhravý 18' | Report | | Stadium: Stadio Luigi Ferraris; Attendance: 26,920; Referee: Livio Bazzoli |

| 15 March 1992 25 | Lazio | 2–0 | Hellas Verona | Rome |
| | Pellegrini 57' (o.g.); Stroppa 89' | Report | | Stadium: Stadio Olimpico; Attendance: 28,993; Referee: Angelo Amendolia |

| 29 March 1992 26 | Juventus | 1–1 | Lazio | Turin |
| | Schillaci 90' | Report | Riedle 83' | Stadium: Stadio delle Alpi; Attendance: 47,460; Referee: Pierluigi Collina |

| 5 April 1992 27 | Lazio | 3–1 | Bari | Rome |
| | Riedle 19'; Sosa 21', 50' | Report | Cucchi 31' | Stadium: Stadio Olimpico; Attendance: 32,926; Referee: Pierluigi Pairetto |

| 12 April 1992 28 | Lazio | 1–1 | Fiorentina | Rome |
| | Stroppa 55' | Report | Branca 90' | Stadium: Stadio Olimpico; Attendance: 40,789; Referee: Walter Cinciripini |

| 18 April 1992 29 | Napoli | 3–0 | Lazio | Naples |
| | Blanc 25'; Careca 57', 81' | Report | | Stadium: Stadio San Paolo; Attendance: 44,362; Referee: Rosario Lo Bello |

| 26 April 1992 30 | Lazio | 3–2 | Cremonese | Rome |
| | Doll 9'; Sosa 32' (pen.); Riedle 49' | Report | Dezotti 34' (pen.); Marcolin 64' | Stadium: Stadio Olimpico; Attendance: 27,374; Referee: Pasquale Rodomonti |

| 3 May 1992 31 | Milan | 2–0 | Lazio | Milan |
| | Massaro 25'; Fuser 84' | Report | | Stadium: San Siro; Attendance: 75,581; Referee: Marcello Nicchi |

| 10 May 1992 32 | Foggia | 2–1 | Lazio | Foggia |
| | Rambaudi 49'; Baiano 52' | Report | Sosa 90' | Stadium: Stadio Pino Zaccheria; Attendance: 19,401; Referee: Loris Stafoggia |

| 17 May 1992 33 | Lazio | 1–2 | Sampdoria | Rome |
| | Doll 13' | Report | Buso 32', 76' | Stadium: Stadio Olimpico; Attendance: 26,151; Referee: Luciano Luci |

| 24 May 1992 34 | Cagliari | 0–1 | Lazio | Cagliari |
| | | Report | Doll 73' | Stadium: Stadio Sant'Elia; Attendance: 20,758; Referee: Graziano Cesari |

=== Coppa Italia ===
==== Second round ====
| 28 August 1991 First leg | Fidelis Andria | 0–2 | Lazio | Andria |
| | | | Doll 6'; Stroppa 29' | Stadium: Stadio Degli Ulivi; Attendance: 12,000; Referee: Graziano Cesari |

| 3 September 1991 Second leg | Lazio | 3–2 (5–2 agg.) | Fidelis Andria | Rome |
| | Sosa 52', 59'; Melchiori 81' | | Mastini 45' (pen.); Ercoli 73' | Stadium: Stadio Olimpico; Attendance: 9,110; Referee: Pasquale Rodomonti |

==== Round of 16 ====
| 29 October 1991 First leg | Torino | 2–0 | Lazio | Turin |
| | Annoni 34'; Vieri 43' | | | Stadium: Stadio delle Alpi; Attendance: 5,000; Referee: Rosario Lo Bello |

| 11 December 1991 Second leg | Lazio | 0–0 (0–2 agg.) | Torino | Rome |
| | | | | Stadium: Stadio Olimpico; Attendance: 35,000; Referee: Angelo Amendolia |

== Statistics ==
=== Squad statistics ===
| Overall | | | | | | | | Home | | | | | | Away | | | | | |
| Pld | W | D | L | GF | GA | GD | Pts | W | D | L | GF | GA | GD | W | D | L | GF | GA | GD |
|---|---|---|---|---|---|---|---|---|---|---|---|---|---|---|---|---|---|---|---|
| 34 | 11 | 12 | 11 | 43 | 40 | +3 | 45 | 6 | 9 | 2 | 29 | 21 | +8 | 5 | 3 | 9 | 14 | 19 | −5 |

=== Player statistics ===
| No. | Pos | Nat | Player | Total | | 1991–92 Serie A | | 1991–92 Coppa Italia | |
| No. | Pos | Nat | Player | Apps | Goals | Apps | Goals | Apps | Goals |
|---|---|---|---|---|---|---|---|---|---|
| | GK | (Italy) ITA | Valerio Fiori | 35 | -41 | 32 | -37 | 3 | -4 |
| | DF | (Italy) ITA | Cristiano Bergodi | 29 | 1 | 25+1 | 1 | 3 | 0 |
| | DF | (Italy) ITA | Angelo Gregucci | 30 | 0 | 26 | 0 | 4 | 0 |
| | DF | (Italy) ITA | Raffaele Sergio | 27 | 1 | 21+4 | 1 | 2 | 0 |
| | DF | (Italy) ITA | Roberto Soldà | 27 | 0 | 26 | 0 | 1 | 0 |
| | MF | (Italy) ITA | Roberto Bacci | 37 | 0 | 33 | 0 | 4 | 0 |
| | MF | (Germany) GER | Thomas Doll | 35 | 8 | 31 | 7 | 4 | 1 |
| | MF | (Italy) ITA | Gabriele Pin | 36 | 1 | 32 | 1 | 4 | 0 |
| | MF | (Italy) ITA | Claudio Sclosa | 33 | 1 | 30 | 1 | 3 | 0 |
| | FW | (Germany) GER | Karl-Heinz Riedle | 33 | 13 | 28+1 | 13 | 4 | 0 |
| | FW | (Uruguay) URU | Rubén Sosa | 35 | 15 | 30+1 | 13 | 4 | 2 |
| | GK | (Italy) ITA | Fernando Orsi | 4 | -3 | 2+1 | -3 | 1 | 0 |
| | DF | (Italy) ITA | Luigi Corino | 21 | 0 | 17+3 | 0 | 1 | 0 |
| | MF | (Italy) ITA | Giovanni Stroppa | 33 | 5 | 14+16 | 4 | 3 | 1 |
| | FW | (Italy) ITA | Maurizio Neri | 19 | 0 | 8+8 | 0 | 3 | 0 |
| | MF | (Italy) ITA | Stefano Melchiori | 22 | 1 | 7+13 | 0 | 2 | 1 |
| | DF | (Italy) ITA | Rufo Emiliano Verga | 8 | 0 | 6 | 0 | 2 | 0 |
| | MF | (Italy) ITA | Franco Marchegiani | 6 | 0 | 3+2 | 0 | 1 | 0 |
| FW | ITA | Berardino Capocchiano | | | | | | | |
| | DF | (Italy) ITA | Claudio Vertova | 2 | 0 | 1+1 | 0 | | |
| | GK | (Italy) ITA | Flavio Roma | | | | | | |
| | DF | (Italy) ITA | Davide Lampugnani | | | | | | |
| | MF | (Italy) ITA | Armando Madonna | | | | | | |
| | MF | (Italy) ITA | Alessandro Manetti | | | | | | |

- Source: http://calcio-seriea.net/presenze/1991/1028/
