= 1990–91 SS Lazio season =

Lazio
1990–91 season
- Chairman: Gianmarco Calleri
- Head coach: Dino Zoff
- Stadium: Stadio Olimpico
- Serie A: 11th
- Coppa Italia: Second round
- Top goalscorer: League: Rubén Sosa (11); All: Rubén Sosa (12)
Home colours	Away colours

The 1990–91 season was the 91st season in the existence of SS Lazio and the club's third consecutive season in the top flight of Italian football. In addition to the domestic league, Lazio participated in this season's edition of the Coppa Italia.

== Players ==
=== First-team squad ===
Note: Flags indicate national team as defined under FIFA eligibility rules; some limited exceptions apply. Players may hold more than one non-FIFA nationality.

Pos.	Nation	Player
GK	ITA	Valerio Fiori
GK	ITA	Fernando Orsi
DF	ITA	Roberto Bacci
DF	ITA	Cristiano Bergodi
DF	ITA	Angelo Gregucci
DF	ITA	Davide Lampugnani
DF	ITA	Massimiliano Nardecchia
DF	ITA	Raffaele Sergio
DF	ITA	Roberto Soldà
DF	ITA	Claudio Vertova
MF	ITA	Sergio Domini

Pos.	Nation	Player
MF	ITA	Andrea Icardi
MF	ITA	Franco Marchegiani
MF	ITA	Davide Olivares
MF	ITA	Gabriele Pin
MF	ITA	Claudio Sclosa
MF	ARG	Pedro Troglio
FW	ITA	Alessandro Bertoni
FW	ITA	Armando Madonna
FW	FRG	Karl-Heinz Riedle
FW	ITA	Giampaolo Saurini
FW	URU	Rubén Sosa

=== Transfers ===
In
Pos.	Name	From	Type
FW	Karl-Heinz Riedle	Werder Bremen	
DF	Roberto Bacci	Mantova	
DF	Davide Lampugnani	Mantova	
MF	Oberdan Biagioni	Monopoli	loan ended
MF	Sergio Domini	Cesena	
FW	Armando Madonna	Atalanta B.C.	
FW	Giampaolo Saurini	Lodigiani	loan ended

Out
Pos.	Name	To	Modalità
FW	Paolo Di Canio	Juventus	
DF	Paolo Beruatto	Mantova	
DF	Marco Monti	Atalanta B.C.	
DF	Massimo Piscedda	Avellino	
MF	Oberdan Biagioni	Cosenza	
MF	Alessandro Manetti	Mantova	loan
FW	Amarildo	Cesena	

==== Autumn ====
In
Pos.	Name	from	Type
DF	Claudio Vertova	Atalanta B.C.	

Out
Pos.	Name	To	Type
DF	Massimiliano Nardecchia	Mantova	
MF	Andrea Icardi	Hellas Verona	
MF	Davide Olivares	Virescit Bergamo	

== Competitions ==
=== Overall record ===
Competition	First match	Last match	Starting round	Final position	Record							
Competition	First match	Last match	Starting round	Final position	Pld	W	D	L	GF	GA	GD	Win %
Serie A	9 September 1990	26 May 1991	Matchday 1	11th	34	8	19	7	33	36	−3	23.53
Coppa Italia	5 September 1990	13 September 1990	Second round	Second round	2	0	1	1	1	3	−2	0.00
Total					36	8	20	8	34	39	−5	22.22

Source: Competitions

=== Serie A ===
==== League table ====
Pos	Team	Pld	W	D	L	GF	GA	GD	Pts	Qualification or relegation
9	Roma	34	11	14	9	43	37	+6	36	Qualification to Cup Winners' Cup
10	Atalanta	34	11	13	10	38	37	+1	35	
11	Lazio	34	8	19	7	33	36	−3	35	
12	Fiorentina	34	8	15	11	40	34	+6	31	
13	Bari	34	9	11	14	41	47	−6	29	

Source: 1990–91 Serie A, RSSSF.com
Rules for classification: 1) Points; 2) Head-to-head points; 3) Head-to-head goal difference; 4) Goal difference; 5) Goals scored; 6) Draw.

==== Results summary ====
Overall								Home						Away					
Pld	W	D	L	GF	GA	GD	Pts	W	D	L	GF	GA	GD	W	D	L	GF	GA	GD
34	8	19	7	33	36	−3	43	5	11	1	21	16	+5	3	8	6	12	20	−8

Source: Serie A

==== Results by round ====
Round	1	2	3	4	5	6	7	8	9	10	11	12	13	14	15	16	17	18	19	20	21	22	23	24	25	26	27	28	29	30	31	32	33	34
Ground	A	H	A	H	H	A	H	A	H	A	H	H	A	H	A	H	A	H	A	H	A	A	H	A	H	A	H	A	A	H	A	H	A	H
Result	D	D	L	D	W	D	D	W	D	D	D	D	L	D	D	D	D	W	D	W	L	W	W	D	D	L	D	D	L	L	W	W	L	D
Position	8	7	12	11	6	7	7	6	7	7	6	6	7	7	7	8	8	7	7	6	8	6	6	7	7	8	6	7	8	10	9	8	9	11

Source: http://calcio-seriea.net/allenatori_squadra/1990/1015/
A = Away; H = Home; W = Win; D = Draw; L = Loss; = 1991–92 European Cup; = 1991–92 UEFA Cup; = 1991–92 Serie B

==== Matches ====
9 September 1990 1	Torino	0–0	Lazio	Turin
				Stadium: Stadio delle Alpi; Attendance: 36,250; Referee: Pierluigi Magni

16 September 1990 2	Lazio	0–0	Parma	Rome
				Stadium: Stadio Olimpico; Attendance: 34,031; Referee: Piero Ceccarini

23 September 1990 3	Lecce	1–0	Lazio	Lecce
	Pasculli 25'			Stadium: Stadio Via del Mare; Attendance: 12,789; Referee: Robert Boggi

30 September 1990 4	Lazio	1–1	Milan	Rome
	Riedle 54'		Evani 89'	Stadium: Stadio Olimpico; Attendance: 50,447; Referee: Pierluigi Pairetto

7 October 1990 5	Lazio	3–1	Bologna	Rome
	Madonna 8'; Riedle 50'; Sosa 88'		Iliev 86' (pen.)	Stadium: Stadio Olimpico; Attendance: 29,551; Referee: Alfredo Trentalange

21 October 1990 6	Juventus	0–0	Lazio	Turin
				Stadium: Stadio delle Alpi; Attendance: 40,284; Referee: Pietro D'Elia

28 October 1990 7	Lazio	1–1	Bari	Rome
	Sosa 45'		Răducioiu 26'	Stadium: Stadio Olimpico; Attendance: 32,782; Referee: Mario Bruni

11 November 1990 8	Cagliari	0–1	Lazio	Cagliari
			Festa 61' (o.g.)	Stadium: Stadio Sant'Elia; Attendance: 19,370; Referee: Luciano Luci

18 November 1990 9	Lazio	2–2	Atalanta	Rome
	Riedle 1'; Saurini 82'		Pasciullo 14'; Nicolini 41'	Stadium: Stadio Olimpico; Attendance: 32,219; Referee: Virginio Quartuccio

25 November 1990 10	Cesena	1–1	Lazio	Cesena
	Ciocci 34'		Gregucci 63'	Stadium: Stadio Dino Manuzzi; Attendance: 15,032; Referee: Piero Ceccarini

2 December 1990 11	Lazio	1–1	Roma	Rome
	Sosa 55'		Völler 45' (pen.)	Stadium: Stadio Olimpico; Attendance: 58,927; Referee: Rosario Lo Bello

9 December 1990 12	Lazio	1–1	Genoa	Rome
	Riedle 44' (pen.)		Ruotolo 50'	Stadium: Stadio Olimpico; Attendance: 24,790; Referee: Maurizio Mughetti

16 December 1990 13	Napoli	2–1	Lazio	Naples
	Careca 6'; Incocciati 22'		Sosa 17'	Stadium: Stadio San Paolo; Attendance: 47,919; Referee: Carlo Sguizzato

30 December 1990 14	Lazio	0–0	Pisa	Rome
				Stadium: Stadio Olimpico; Attendance: 30,459; Referee: Werther Cornieti

6 January 1991 15	Fiorentina	1–1	Lazio	Florence
	Bergodi 45' (o.g.)		Sosa 17'	Stadium: Stadio Comunale; Attendance: 25,375; Referee: Pierluigi Pairetto

13 January 1991 16	Lazio	0–0	Internazionale	Rome
				Stadium: Stadio Olimpico; Attendance: 52,997; Referee: Tullio Lanese

20 January 1991 17	Sampdoria	1–1	Lazio	Genoa
	Vialli 51'		Sosa 85'	Stadium: Stadio Luigi Ferraris; Attendance: 25,191; Referee: Gianni Beschin

27 January 1991 18	Lazio	2–1	Torino	Rome
	Pin 45', 69'		Lentini 89'	Stadium: Stadio Olimpico; Attendance: 28,873; Referee: Angelo Amendolia

3 February 1991 19	Parma	0–0	Lazio	Parma
				Stadium: Stadio Ennio Tardini; Attendance: 17,819; Referee: Walter Cinciripini

10 February 1991 20	Lazio	2–0	Lecce	Rome
	Morello 35' (o.g.); Gregucci 37'			Stadium: Stadio Olimpico; Attendance: 24,707; Referee: Giancarlo Dal Forno

17 February 1991 21	Milan	3–1	Lazio	Milan
	van Basten 44'; Gullit 46'; Massaro 51'		Troglio 62'	Stadium: San Siro; Attendance: 75,395; Referee: Loris Stafoggia

24 February 1991 22	Bologna	1–2	Lazio	Bologna
	Türkyilmaz 85'		Riedle 22'; Sosa 78'	Stadium: Stadio Renato Dall'Ara; Attendance: 19,774; Referee: Fabio Baldas

3 March 1991 23	Lazio	1–0	Juventus	Rome
	Riedle 35'			Stadium: Stadio Olimpico; Attendance: 62,480; Referee: Carlo Sguizzato

10 March 1991 24	Bari	0–0	Lazio	Bari
				Stadium: Stadio San Nicola; Attendance: 25,906; Referee: Pierluigi Magni

17 March 1991 25	Lazio	1–1	Cagliari	Rome
	Sosa 48' (pen.)		Herrera 89'	Stadium: Stadio Olimpico; Attendance: 34,866; Referee: Piero Ceccarini

24 March 1991 26	Atalanta	4–1	Lazio	Bologna
	Bonacina 27'; Evair 32' (pen.); Perrone 81'; Caniggia 86' (pen.)		Riedle 44'	Stadium: Stadio Renato Dall'Ara; Attendance: 10,884; Referee: Loris Stafoggia

30 March 1991 27	Lazio	1–1	Cesena	Rome
	Nobile 40' (o.g.)		Leoni 80'	Stadium: Stadio Olimpico; Attendance: 21,039; Referee: Giancarlo Dal Forno

6 April 1991 28	Roma	1–1	Lazio	Rome
	Völler 53' (pen.)		Sosa 80'	Stadium: Stadio Olimpico; Attendance: 68,081; Referee: Pierluigi Pairetto

14 April 1991 29	Genoa	3–1	Lazio	Genoa
	Skuhravý 40', 83'; Bortolazzi 69'		Madonna 79'	Stadium: Stadio Luigi Ferraris; Attendance: 28,026; Referee: Dario Boemo

21 April 1991 30	Lazio	0–2	Napoli	Rome
			Alemão 54'; Zola 86'	Stadium: Stadio Olimpico; Attendance: 31,462; Referee: Rosario Lo Bello

5 May 1991 31	Pisa	0–1	Lazio	Pisa
			Sosa 70'	Stadium: Arena Garibaldi; Attendance: 14,516; Referee: Tullio Lanese

12 May 1991 32	Lazio	2–1	Fiorentina	Rome
	Riedle 29'; Sosa 85'		Orlando 6'	Stadium: Stadio Olimpico; Attendance: 26,904; Referee: Vincenzo Fucci

18 May 1991 33	Internazionale	2–0	Lazio	Milan
	Battistini 58'; Klinsmann 82'			Stadium: San Siro; Attendance: 39,700; Referee: Walter Cornieti

26 May 1991 34	Lazio	3–3	Sampdoria	Rome
	Marchegiani 1', 75'; Riedle 9'		Vierchowod 22'; Mancini 38' (pen.), 49'	Stadium: Stadio Olimpico; Attendance: 34,426; Referee: Massimo Chiesa

=== Coppa Italia ===
==== Second round ====
5 September 1990 First leg	Modena	0–0	Lazio	Modena
				Stadium: Stadio Alberto Braglia; Attendance: 8,000; Referee: Marcello Nicchi

13 September 1990 Second leg	Lazio	1–3 (1–3 agg.)	Modena	Rome
	Sosa 40'		Bonaldi 2'; Brogi 59'; Sergio 65' (o.g.)	Stadium: Stadio Olimpico; Attendance: 20,000; Referee: Luciano Luci

== Statistics ==
=== Players statistics ===
No.	Pos	Nat	Player	Total		Serie A	
No.	Pos	Nat	Player	Apps	Goals	Apps	Goals
	GK	(Italy) ITA	Fiori	34	-36	34	-36
	DF	(Italy) ITA	Bergodi	33	0	32+1	0
	DF	(Italy) ITA	Gregucci	31	2	31	2
	DF	(Italy) ITA	Sergio	34	0	34	0
	DF	(Italy) ITA	Solda	29	0	29	0
	MF	(Italy) ITA	Pin	32	2	32	2
	MF	(Italy) ITA	Sclosa	30	0	29+1	0
	MF	(Italy) ITA	Domini	21	0	20+1	0
	MF	(Italy) ITA	Madonna	25	2	24+1	2
	FW	(West Germany) FRG	Riedle	33	9	33	9
	FW	(Uruguay) URU	Sosa	33	11	33	11
	GK	(Italy) ITA	Orsi	0	0	0	0
	DF	(Italy) ITA	Bacci	20	0	18+2	0
	MF	(Argentina) ARG	Troglio	16	1	11+5	1
	MF	(Italy) ITA	Marchegiani	14	2	5+9	2
	DF	(Italy) ITA	Lampugnani	6	0	3+3	0
	DF	(Italy) ITA	Vertova	4	0	3+1	0
	FW	(Italy) ITA	Saurini	11	1	2+9	1
	FW	(Italy) ITA	Bertoni	8	0	1+7	0
	DF	(Italy) ITA	Nardecchia	0	0	0	0
	MF	(Italy) ITA	Icardi				
	MF	(Italy) ITA	Olivares				

- Source: http://calcio-seriea.net/allenatori_squadra/1990/1015/
