= 1989–90 SS Lazio season =

Lazio
1989–90 season
- Owner: Gianmarco Calleri
- Chairman: Gianmarco Calleri
- Manager: Giuseppe Materazzi
- Stadium: Stadio Flaminio (Note: Temporary home stadium during the 1989–90 season whilst Stadio Olimpico was renovated)
- Serie A: 9th
- Coppa Italia: 2nd Round
- Top goalscorer: League: Rubén Sosa; Amarildo (8); All: Amarildo (9)
Home colours	Away colours

The 1989–90 season was the 90th season in the existence of SS Lazio and the club's second consecutive season in the top flight of Italian football. In addition to the domestic league, Lazio participated in this season's edition of the Coppa Italia.

== Squad ==
Note: Flags indicate national team as defined under FIFA eligibility rules; some limited exceptions apply. Players may hold more than one non-FIFA nationality.

Pos.	Nation	Player
GK	ITA	Valerio Fiori
GK	ITA	Fernando Orsi
DF	ITA	Cristiano Bergodi
DF	ITA	Paolo Beruatto
DF	ITA	Angelo Gregucci
DF	ITA	Marco Monti
DF	ITA	Massimo Piscedda
DF	ITA	Massimiliano Nardecchia
DF	ITA	Raffaele Sergio
DF	ITA	Roberto Soldà
MF	ITA	Oberdan Biagioni

Pos.	Nation	Player
MF	ITA	Andrea Icardi
MF	ITA	Alessandro Manetti
MF	ITA	Franco Marchegiani
MF	ITA	Davide Olivares
MF	ITA	Gabriele Pin
MF	ITA	Claudio Sclosa
MF	ARG	Pedro Troglio
FW	BRA	Amarildo
FW	URU	Rubén Sosa
FW	ITA	Paolo Di Canio
FW	ITA	Alessandro Bertoni

== Competitions ==
=== Serie A ===
==== League table ====
Pos	Team	Pld	W	D	L	GF	GA	GD	Pts	Qualification or relegation
7	Atalanta	34	12	11	11	36	43	−7	35	Qualification to UEFA Cup
8	Bologna	34	9	16	9	29	36	−7	34	Qualification to UEFA Cup
9	Lazio	34	8	15	11	34	33	+1	31	
10	Bari	34	6	19	9	34	37	−3	31	
11	Genoa	34	6	17	11	27	31	−4	29	

Source: 1989–90 Serie A, RSSSF.com
Rules for classification: 1) Points; 2) Head-to-head points; 3) Head-to-head goal difference; 4) Goal difference; 5) Goals scored; 6) Draw.

==== Results summary ====
Overall								Home						Away					
Pld	W	D	L	GF	GA	GD	Pts	W	D	L	GF	GA	GD	W	D	L	GF	GA	GD
34	8	15	11	34	33	+1	39	6	7	4	25	14	+11	2	8	7	9	19	−10

==== Results by round ====
Round	1	2	3	4	5	6	7	8	9	10	11	12	13	14	15	16	17	18	19	20	21	22	23	24	25	26	27	28	29	30	31	32	33	34
Ground	H	A	H	A	H	A	H	A	H	A	H	A	H	H	A	A	H	A	H	A	H	A	H	A	H	A	H	A	H	A	A	H	H	A
Result	L	W	D	L	W	D	D	D	W	L	L	D	D	D	D	W	W	L	L	L	D	D	D	L	W	D	W	L	L	D	D	W	D	L
Position	13	6	7	12	9	8	8	8	6	8	9	10	10	10	10	10	8	9	9	10	10	9	9	10	9	9	9	9	10	10	10	9	9	9

Source: Competitive matches
A = Away; H = Home; W = Win; D = Draw; L = Loss; = 1990–91 European Cup; = 1990–91 UEFA Cup; = 1990–91 Serie B

==== Matches ====
27 August 1989 1	Lazio	0–2	Sampdoria	Rome
		Report	Pellegrini 29'; Vialli 34'	Stadium: Stadio Flaminio; Attendance: 19,818; Referee: Luigi Agnolin

3 September 1989 2	Milan	0–1	Lazio	Milan
		Report	Maldini 41' (o.g.)	Stadium: San Siro; Attendance: 52,737; Referee: Carlo Sguizzato

6 September 1989 3	Lazio	1–1	Cremonese	Rome
	Sosa 62'	Report	Dezotti 19'	Stadium: Stadio Flaminio; Attendance: 20,825; Referee: Luciano Luci

10 September 1989 4	Fiorentina	1–0	Lazio	Florence
	Baggio 71' (pen.)	Report		Stadium: Stadio Comunale; Attendance: 9,578; Referee: Pierluigi Magni

17 September 1989 5	Lazio	3–0	Lecce	Rome
	Amarildo 4', 21'; Gregucci 26'	Report		Stadium: Stadio Flaminio; Attendance: 18,155; Referee: Werther Cornieti

24 September 1989 6	Hellas Verona	1–1	Lazio	Verona
	Iorio 37' (pen.)	Report	Sotomayor 55' (o.g.)	Stadium: Stadio Marcantonio Bentegodi; Attendance: 15,116; Referee: Fabio Baldas

1 October 1989 7	Lazio	1–1	Juventus	Rome
	Di Canio 38'	Report	De Agostini 53' (pen.)	Stadium: Stadio Flaminio; Attendance: 23,660; Referee: Luigi Agnolin

8 October 1989 8	Cesena	0–0	Lazio	Cesena
		Report		Stadium: Stadio Dino Manuzzi; Attendance: 12,994; Referee: Angelo Amendiola

22 October 1989 9	Lazio	3–0	Bologna	Rome
	Di Canio 53'; Sosa 79', 85'	Report		Stadium: Stadio Flaminio; Attendance: 21,262; Referee: Pierluigi Pairetto

29 October 1989 10	Internazionale	3–0	Lazio	Milan
	Morello 39'; Brehme 52' (pen.); Serena 67'	Report		Stadium: San Siro; Attendance: 42,823; Referee: Arcangelo Pezzella

5 November 1989 11	Lazio	1–2	Atalanta	Rome
	Amarildo 13'	Report	Evair 36', 38'	Stadium: Stadio Flaminio; Attendance: 18,582; Referee: Bruno Di Cola

19 November 1989 12	Roma	1–1	Lazio	Rome
	Giannini 83'	Report	Bertoni 65'	Stadium: Stadio Flaminio; Attendance: 22,140; Referee: Pietro D'Elia

26 November 1989 13	Lazio	0–0	Genoa	Rome
		Report		Stadium: Stadio Flaminio; Attendance: 17,901; Referee: Carlo Sguizzato

3 December 1989 14	Lazio	2–2	Bari	Rome
	Di Canio 18'; Sosa 78'	Report	João Paulo 79'	Stadium: Stadio Flaminio; Attendance: 20,166; Referee: Moreno Frigerio

10 December 1989 15	Ascoli	0–0	Lazio	Ascoli Piceno
		Report		Stadium: Stadio Cino e Lillo Del Duca; Attendance: 9,009; Referee: Tullio Lanese

17 December 1989 16	Udinese	0–2	Lazio	Udine
		Report	Vanoli 76' (o.g.); Pin 86'	Stadium: Stadio Friuli; Attendance: 16,033; Referee: Gianni Beschin

30 December 1989 17	Lazio	3–0	Napoli	Rome
	Amarildo 36', 81'; Pin 77'	Report		Stadium: Stadio Flaminio; Attendance: 19,534; Referee: Luigi Agnolin

7 January 1990 18	Sampdoria	2–0	Lazio	Genoa
	Mancini 82', 86' (pen.)	Report		Stadium: Stadio Luigi Ferraris; Attendance: 23,803; Referee: Rosario Lo Bello

14 January 1990 19	Lazio	1–3	Milan	Rome
	Amarildo 66'	Report	Massaro 5'; Fuser 10'; Colombo 71'	Stadium: Stadio Flaminio; Attendance: 22,249; Referee: Pietro D'Elia

17 January 1990 20	Cremonese	2–1	Lazio	Cremona
	Dezotti 55'; Limpar 79'	Report	Bergodi 82'	Stadium: Stadio Giovanni Zini; Attendance: 7,921; Referee: Carlo Sguizzato

21 January 1990 21	Lazio	1–1	Fiorentina	Rome
	Sosa 33'	Report	Kubík 70'	Stadium: Stadio Flaminio; Attendance: 18,496; Referee: Werther Cornieti

28 January 1990 22	Lecce	0–0	Lazio	Lecce
		Report		Stadium: Stadio Via del Mare; Attendance: 14,258; Referee: Pierluigi Magni

4 February 1990 23	Lazio	0–0	Hellas Verona	Rome
		Report		Stadium: Stadio Flaminio; Attendance: 19,500; Referee: Giancarlo Dal Forno

11 February 1990 24	Juventus	1–0	Lazio	Turin
	Casiraghi 72'	Report		Stadium: Stadio Comunale; Attendance: 22,151; Referee: Angelo Amendiola

18 February 1990 25	Lazio	4–0	Cesena	Rome
	Pin 36', 46'; Amarildo 49'; Sosa 53'	Report		Stadium: Stadio Flaminio; Attendance: 17,500; Referee: Gianni Beschin

25 February 1990 26	Bologna	1–1	Lazio	Bologna
	Giordano 26' (pen.)	Report	Pin 40'	Stadium: Stadio Renato Dall'Ara; Attendance: 23,918; Referee: Marcello Nicchi

4 March 1990 27	Lazio	2–1	Internazionale	Rome
	Sosa 11' (pen.); Pin 50'	Report	Mandorlini 43'	Stadium: Stadio Flaminio; Attendance: 23,142; Referee: Tullio Lanese

11 March 1990 28	Atalanta	4–0	Lazio	Bergamo
	Caniggia 34', 37'; Bresciani 49'; Madonna 58' (pen.)	Report		Stadium: Stadio Comunale; Attendance: 19,568; Referee: Alfredo Trentalange

18 March 1990 29	Lazio	0–1	Roma	Rome
		Report	Völler 30'	Stadium: Stadio Flaminio; Attendance: 23,034; Referee: Fabio Baldas

25 March 1990 30	Genoa	2–2	Lazio	Genoa
	Fontolan 48', 80'	Report	Collovati 38' (o.g.); Bertoni 74'	Stadium: Stadio Luigi Ferraris; Attendance: 24,935; Referee: Mario Bruni

8 April 1990 31	Bari	0–0	Lazio	Bari
		Report		Stadium: Stadio della Vittoria; Attendance: 22,000; Referee: Robert Boggi

15 April 1990 32	Lazio	3–0	Ascoli	Rome
	Sosa 6'; Amarildo 37'; Marchegiani 38'	Report		Stadium: Stadio Flaminio; Attendance: 16,715; Referee: Mauro Felicani

22 April 1990 33	Lazio	0–0	Udinese	Rome
		Report		Stadium: Stadio Flaminio; Attendance: 19,000; Referee: Pierluigi Magni

29 April 1990 34	Napoli	1–0	Lazio	Naples
	Baroni 7'	Report		Stadium: Stadio San Paolo; Attendance: 62,499; Referee: Carlo Sguizzato

==== Topscorers ====
- (Brazil) Amarildo 8
- (Uruguay) Rubén Sosa 8
- (Italy) Gabriele Pin 6
- (Italy) Paolo Di Canio 3

=== Coppa Italia ===
==== First round ====
23 August 1989	Lazio	2–0	Ancona	Rome
	Chiodini 12' (o.g.); Di Canio 41'			Stadium: Stadio Flaminio; Attendance: 19,000; Referee: Alessandro Guidi

==== Second round ====
30 August 1989	Lazio	1–2 (a.e.t.)	Bologna	Rome
	Amarildo 107'		B. Giordano 91'; Marronaro 97'	Stadium: Stadio Flaminio; Attendance: 19,240; Referee: Pietro D'Elia
