= 1992–93 SS Lazio season =

Lazio
1992–93 season
- Owner: Sergio Cragnotti
- President: Sergio Cragnotti
- Manager: Dino Zoff
- Stadium: Stadio Olimpico
- Serie A: 5th
- Coppa Italia: Quarter-finals
- Top goalscorer: League: Giuseppe Signori (26); All: Giuseppe Signori (32)
Home colours	Away colours

The 1992–93 season was Società Sportiva Lazio's 93rd season since the club's existence and their fifth consecutive season in the top-flight of Italian football. In this season, Lazio finished in fifth in Serie A and reached the quarter-final in the Coppa Italia. Prior to the season had Lazio with new Chairman Sergio Cragnotti made three important signings, with Paul Gascoigne, Giuseppe Signori and Aron Winter all joining the club.

== Squad ==
Note: Flags indicate national team as defined under FIFA eligibility rules; some limited exceptions apply. Players may hold more than one non-FIFA nationality.

Pos.	Nation	Player
GK	ITA	Fernando Orsi
GK	ITA	Valerio Fiori
GK	ITA	Flavio Roma
DF	ITA	Cristiano Bergodi
DF	ITA	Mauro Bonomi
DF	ITA	Roberto Cravero
DF	BRA	Djair
DF	ITA	Giuseppe Favalli
DF	ITA	Angelo Gregucci
DF	ITA	Luca Luzardi
MF	ITA	Armando Madonna

Pos.	Nation	Player
MF	GER	Thomas Doll
MF	ITA	Diego Fuser
MF	NED	Aron Winter
MF	ENG	Paul Gascoigne
MF	ITA	Dario Marcolin
MF	ITA	Claudio Sclosa
MF	ITA	Giovanni Stroppa
FW	ITA	Giuseppe Signori
FW	ITA	Marco Nappi
FW	ITA	Maurizio Neri
FW	GER	Karl-Heinz Riedle

=== Transfers ===
In
Pos.	Name	from	Type
MF	Paul Gascoigne	Tottenham Hotspur	
MF	Aron Winter	AFC Ajax	
FW	Giuseppe Signori	Foggia Calcio	
MF	Diego Fuser	A.C. Milan	
DF	Roberto Cravero	Torino	
DF	Mauro Bonomi	U.S. Cremonese	
DF	Giuseppe Favalli	U.S. Cremonese	
MF	Dario Marcolin	U.S. Cremonese	
MF	Djair	Saint-Gallen	
GK	Paolo Di Sarno	Ternana	
DF	Luca Luzardi	Brescia Calcio	
FW	Armando Madonna	Piacenza Calcio	loan ended

Out
Pos.	Name	To	Type
FW	Rubén Sosa	Internazionale	
MF	Gabriele Pin	Parma F.C.	
DF	Raffaele Sergio	Torino	
DF	Rufo Emiliano Verga	Fiorentina	
DF	Claudio Vertova	Lecco	
MF	Alessandro Manetti	Acireale	
MF	Stefano Melchiori	Lecce	
FW	Berardino Capocchiano	A.S. Bari	

==== Winter ====
In
Pos.	Name	from	Type

Out
Pos.	Name	To	Type
GK	Paolo Di Sarno	Udinese Calcio	
DF	Roberto Solda	A.C. Monza	
MF	Djair	SC Internacional	
FW	Armando Madonna	S.P.A.L.	

== Competitions ==
=== Serie A ===
==== League table ====
Pos	Team	Pld	W	D	L	GF	GA	GD	Pts	Qualification or relegation
3	Parma (Note: Parma qualified to 1993–94 UEFA Cup Winners' Cup as defending champions.)	34	16	9	9	47	34	+13	41	Qualification to Cup Winners' Cup
4	Juventus	34	15	9	10	59	47	+12	39	Qualification to UEFA Cup
5	Lazio	34	13	12	9	65	51	+14	38	Qualification to UEFA Cup
6	Cagliari	34	14	9	11	45	33	+12	37	Qualification to UEFA Cup
7	Sampdoria	34	12	12	10	50	48	+2	36	

Source: 1992–93 Serie A, RSSSF.com
Rules for classification: 1) Points; 2) Head-to-head points; 3) Head-to-head goal difference; 4) Goal difference; 5) Goals scored; 6) Draw.(Note:

==== Results summary ====
Overall								Home						Away					
Pld	W	D	L	GF	GA	GD	Pts	W	D	L	GF	GA	GD	W	D	L	GF	GA	GD
34	13	12	9	65	51	+14	51	9	6	2	40	20	+20	4	6	7	25	31	−6

==== Results by round ====
Round	1	2	3	4	5	6	7	8	9	10	11	12	13	14	15	16	17	18	19	20	21	22	23	24	25	26	27	28	29	30	31	32	33	34
Ground	A	H	A	H	H	A	H	A	H	A	H	A	H	A	H	A	H	H	A	H	A	A	H	A	H	A	H	A	H	A	H	A	H	A
Result	D	D	D	D	W	L	W	D	L	L	D	W	W	W	W	L	D	W	W	L	W	L	D	D	W	D	D	D	W	L	W	L	W	L
Position	6	6	8	7	5	8	5	6	8	10	10	9	5	3	3	3	4	3	3	4	3	4	4	3	3	3	4	3	3	5	4	5	4	5

Source: Competitive matches
A = Away; H = Home; W = Win; D = Draw; L = Loss; = Leader, 1993–94 UEFA Champions League; = 1993–94 UEFA Cup; = 1993–94 Serie B

==== Matches ====
6 September 1992 1	Sampdoria	3–3	Lazio	Genoa
	Fuser 6' (o.g.); Jugović 33'; Mancini 53'	Report	Signori 18', 21'; Buso 74' (o.g.)	Stadium: Stadio Luigi Ferraris; Attendance: 30,746; Referee: Arcangelo Pezzella

13 September 1992 2	Lazio	2–2	Fiorentina	Rome
	Signori 24' (pen.); Doll 33'	Report	Batistuta 9', 72'	Stadium: Stadio Olimpico; Attendance: 51,967; Referee: Fabio Baldas

20 September 1992 3	Cagliari	1–1	Lazio	Cagliari
	Cappioli 75'	Report	Signori 84'	Stadium: Stadio Sant'Elia; Attendance: 18,758; Referee: Marcello Nicchi

27 September 1992 4	Lazio	1–1	Genoa	Rome
	Gregucci 58'	Report	Padovano 78'	Stadium: Stadio Olimpico; Attendance: 46,126; Referee: Alfredo Trentalange

4 October 1992 5	Lazio	5–2	Parma	Rome
	Signori 12' (pen.), 34', 71' (pen.); Fuser 24', 38'	Report	Osio 30', 43'	Stadium: Stadio Olimpico; Attendance: 41,571; Referee: Carlo Sguizzato

18 October 1992 6	Milan	5–3	Lazio	Milan
	Gullit 13'; Papin 14' van Basten 36' (pen.), 60' (pen.); Simone 80'	Report	Winter 21'; Fuser 52'; Signori 65'	Stadium: San Siro; Attendance: 77,291; Referee: Loris Stafoggia

25 October 1992 7	Lazio	3–0	Atalanta	Rome
	Signori 1'; Winter 51'; Fuser 80'	Report		Stadium: Stadio Olimpico; Attendance: 40,105; Referee: Piero Ceccarini

1 November 1992 8	Udinese	0–0	Lazio	Udine
		Report		Stadium: Stadio Friuli; Attendance: 16,603; Referee: Robert Boggi

8 November 1992 9	Lazio	1–2	Torino	Rome
	Signori 46'	Report	Carlos Aguilera 57'; Gregucci 88' (o.g.)	Stadium: Stadio Olimpico; Attendance: 55,892; Referee: Maurizio Mughetti

22 November 1992 10	Foggia	2–1	Lazio	Foggia
	Biagioni 18' (pen.); Roy 34'	Report	Signori 51'	Stadium: Stadio Pino Zaccheria; Attendance: 17,531; Referee: Walter Cinciripini

29 November 1992 11	Lazio	1–1	Roma	Rome
	Gascoigne 86'	Report	Giannini 47'	Stadium: Stadio Olimpico; Attendance: 73,504; Referee: Luciano Luci

6 December 1992 12	Pescara	2–3	Lazio	Pescara
	Borgonovo 48'; Allegri 73'	Report	Gascoigne 23'; Signori 72'; Luzardi 90'	Stadium: Stadio Adriatico; Attendance: 15,630; Referee: Angelo Amendolia

13 December 1992 13	Lazio	3–1	Internazionale	Rome
	Fuser 60'; Winter 73'; Signori 84'	Report	Fontolan 76'	Stadium: Stadio Olimpico; Attendance: 50,967; Referee: Graziano Cesari

3 January 1993 14	Ancona	0–3	Lazio	Ancona
		Report	Fuser 69'; Signori 85'; Winter 87'	Stadium: Stadio del Conero; Attendance: 11,779; Referee: Massimo Chiesa

10 January 1993 15	Lazio	2–0	Brescia	Rome
	Signori 32', 84'	Report		Stadium: Stadio Olimpico; Attendance: 42,260; Referee: Loris Stafoggia

17 January 1993 16	Napoli	3–1	Lazio	Naples
	Crippa 29'; Fonseca 59'; Careca 70'	Report	Signori 78'	Stadium: Stadio San Paolo; Attendance: 67,054; Referee: Fabio Baldas

24 January 1993 17	Lazio	1–1	Juventus	Rome
	Cravero 42'	Report	R. Baggio 14'	Stadium: Stadio Olimpico; Attendance: 65,748; Referee: Marcello Nicchi

31 January 1993 18	Lazio	2–1	Sampdoria	Rome
	Riedle 6'; Stroppa 87'	Report	Mancini 89'	Stadium: Stadio Olimpico; Attendance: 43,510; Referee: Roberto Bettin

7 February 1993 19	Fiorentina	0–2	Lazio	Florence
		Report	Signori 59'; Fuser 90'	Stadium: Stadio Artemio Franchi; Attendance: 34,576; Referee: Graziano Cesari

14 February 1993 20	Lazio	1–2	Cagliari	Rome
	Fuser 37'	Report	Cappioli 47'; Firicano 61'	Stadium: Stadio Olimpico; Attendance: 43,225; Referee: Pierluigi Pairetto

28 February 1993 21	Genoa	2–3	Lazio	Genoa
	Padovano 23'; Skuhravý 24'	Report	Riedle 26', 87'; Signori 69' (pen.)	Stadium: Stadio Luigi Ferraris; Attendance: 23,389; Referee: Luciano Luci

7 March 1993 22	Parma	2–1	Lazio	Parma
	Melli 15', 76'	Report	Cravero 88'	Stadium: Stadio Ennio Tardini; Attendance: 23,610; Referee: Walter Cinciripini

14 March 1993 23	Lazio	2–2	Milan	Rome
	Gascoigne 38'; Bergodi 86' (o.g.)	Report	Papin 9'; Winter 36' (o.g.)	Stadium: Stadio Olimpico; Attendance: 64,721; Referee: Robert Boggi

21 March 1993 24	Atalanta	2–2	Lazio	Bergamo
	Rambaudi 10'; Ganz 60'	Report	Gascoigne 29'; Signori 74' (pen.)	Stadium: Stadio Atleti Azzurri d'Italia; Attendance: 20,995; Referee: Pasquale Rodomonti

28 March 1993 25	Lazio	4–0	Udinese	Rome
	Signori 30', 86'; Doll 58'; Riedle 87'	Report		Stadium: Stadio Olimpico; Attendance: 41,471; Referee: Marcello Cardona

4 April 1993 26	Torino	1–1	Lazio	Turin
	Scifo 86'	Report	Winter 54'	Stadium: Stadio delle Alpi; Attendance: 22,527; Referee: Piero Ceccarini

10 April 1993 27	Lazio	1–1	Foggia	Rome
	Riedle 28'	Report	De Vincenzo 56'	Stadium: Stadio Olimpico; Attendance: 46,765; Referee: Pierluigi Collina

18 April 1993 28	Roma	0–0	Lazio	Rome
		Report		Stadium: Stadio Olimpico; Attendance: 75,009; Referee: Carlo Sguizzato

25 April 1993 29	Lazio	2–1	Pescara	Rome
	Favalli 24'; Signori 90' (pen.)	Report	Allegri 42' (pen.)	Stadium: Stadio Olimpico; Attendance: 37,384; Referee: Salvatore Racalbuto

9 May 1993 30	Internazionale	2–0	Lazio	Milan
	Bacci 2' (o.g.); Schillaci 84'	Report		Stadium: San Siro; Attendance: 50,135; Referee: Graziano Cesari

16 May 1993 31	Lazio	5–0	Ancona	Rome
	Cravero 26'; Fuser 49'; Riedle 71'; Signori 88', 89'	Report		Stadium: Stadio Olimpico; Attendance: 38,742; Referee: Carlo Dinelli

23 May 1993 32	Brescia	2–0	Lazio	Brescia
	Sabău 49'; Hagi 73'	Report		Stadium: Stadio Mario Rigamonti; Attendance: 10,189; Referee: Pierluigi Collina

30 May 1993 33	Lazio	4–3	Napoli	Rome
	Riedle 1', 4'; Signori 42' (pen.); Winter 50'	Report	Zola 10', 61' (pen.); Francini 47'	Stadium: Stadio Olimpico; Attendance: 49,381; Referee: Marcello Cardona

6 June 1993 34	Juventus	4–1	Lazio	Turin
	R. Baggio 10' (pen.), 31' (pen.); Vialli 18'; Di Canio 73'	Report	Fuser 2'	Stadium: Stadio delle Alpi; Attendance: 42,816; Referee: Carlo Sguizzato

=== Coppa Italia ===
==== Second round ====
26 August 1992 First leg	Ascoli	0–4	Lazio	Ascoli Piceno
			Bacci 21'; Riedle 51'; Signori 66' (pen.); Fuser 88'	Stadium: Stadio Cino e Lillo Del Duca; Attendance: 7,000; Referee: Angelo Amendolia

2 September 1992 Second leg	Lazio	1–0 (5–0 agg.)	Ascoli	Rome
	Signori 66'			Stadium: Stadio Olimpico; Attendance: 20,000; Referee: Carlo Dinelli

==== Round of 16 ====
7 October 1992 First leg	Cesena	1–1	Lazio	Cesena
	Lantignotti 45'		Signori 27'	Stadium: Stadio Dino Manuzzi; Attendance: 7,403; Referee: Massimo Chiesa

28 October 1992 Second leg	Lazio	3–1 (4–2 agg.)	Cesena	Rome
	Riedle 36'; Winter 69'; Signori 90+1'		Hubner 90+3' (pen.)	Stadium: Stadio Olimpico; Attendance: 25,000; Referee: Livio Bazzoli

==== Quarter-finals ====
28 January 1993 First leg	Lazio	2–2	Torino	Rome
	Neri 5'; Signori 34' (pen.)		Fusi 45'; Scifo 88'	Stadium: Stadio Olimpico; Attendance: 23,720; Referee: Carlo Sguizzato

10 February 1993 Second leg	Torino	3–2 (5–4 agg.)	Lazio	Turin
	Luzardi 45' (o.g.); Casagrande 62'; Sordo 76'		Signori 85'; Winter 87'	Stadium: Stadio delle Alpi; Attendance: 13,655; Referee: Angelo Amendolia

== Statistics ==
=== Players statistics ===
No.	Pos	Nat	Player	Total		Serie A		Coppa	
No.	Pos	Nat	Player	Apps	Goals	Apps	Goals	Apps	Goals
	GK	(Italy) ITA	Orsi	25	-36	23	-32	2	-4
	DF	(Italy) ITA	Bacci	35	1	28+3	0	4	1
	DF	(Italy) ITA	Cravero	34	3	30	3	4	0
	DF	(Italy) ITA	Luzardi	28	1	25	1	3	0
	DF	(Italy) ITA	Favalli	36	1	32	1	4	0
	MF	(Italy) ITA	Fuser	38	11	33	10	5	1
	MF	(Netherlands) NED	Winter	36	8	30	6	6	2
	MF	(Germany) GER	Doll	22	2	20	2	2	0
	MF	(England) ENG	Gascoigne	26	4	22	4	4	0
	FW	(Germany) GER	Riedle	26	10	22	8	4	2
	FW	(Italy) ITA	Signori	38	32	32	26	6	6
	GK	(Italy) ITA	Fiori	15	-22	11	-19	4	-3
	DF	(Italy) ITA	Corino	23	0	13+6	0	4	0
	DF	(Italy) ITA	Bergodi	17	1	13+3	1	1	0
	MF	(Italy) ITA	Sclosa	25	0	10+11	0	4	0
	DF	(Italy) ITA	Gregucci	14	1	10+2	1	2	0
	DF	(Italy) ITA	Bonomi	13	0	9+1	0	3	0
	MF	(Italy) ITA	Marcolin	19	0	6+9	0	4	0
	MF	(Italy) ITA	Stroppa	25	1	5+15	1	5	0
	FW	(Italy) ITA	Neri	5	1	2	0	3	1
	GK	(Italy) ITA	Di Sarno	0	0	0	0	-	-
	MF	(Italy) ITA	Madonna	0	0	0	0	-	-
	GK	(Italy) ITA	Roma	0	0	0	0	-	-
	FW	(Brazil) BRA	Djair	0	0	-	-	-	-
		(Italy) ITA	Solda	0	0	-	-	-	-

- Source: http://calcio-seriea.net/presenze/1992/1047/

== See also ==
- 1992–93 Serie A
- 1992–93 Coppa Italia
