= 1993–94 SS Lazio season =

Lazio
1993–94 season
- Owner: Sergio Cragnotti
- President: Sergio Cragnotti
- Manager: Dino Zoff
- Stadium: Stadio Olimpico
- Serie A: 4th
- Coppa Italia: Second round
- UEFA Cup: Second round
- Top goalscorer: League: Giuseppe Signori (23); All: Giuseppe Signori (23)
Home colours	Away colours

The 1993–94 season was Società Sportiva Lazio's 94th season since the club's existence and their sixth consecutive season in the top-flight of Italian football. In this season, Lazio finished in fourth in Serie A.

== Squad ==
Note: Flags indicate national team as defined under FIFA eligibility rules; some limited exceptions apply. Players may hold more than one non-FIFA nationality.

Pos.	Nation	Player
GK	ITA	Luca Marchegiani
GK	ITA	Fernando Orsi
GK	ITA	Giorgio Frezzolini
DF	ITA	Paolo Negro
DF	ITA	Cristiano Bergodi
DF	ITA	Mauro Bonomi
DF	ITA	Roberto Cravero
DF	ITA	Alessandro Nesta
DF	ITA	Luca Luzardi
DF	ITA	Giuseppe Favalli
MF	ITA	Luciano De Paola

Pos.	Nation	Player
MF	ITA	Diego Fuser
MF	SUI	Roberto Di Matteo
MF	ITA	Fabrizio Di Mauro
MF	GER	Thomas Doll
MF	ENG	Paul Gascoigne
MF	ITA	Dario Marcolin
MF	ITA	Claudio Sclosa
MF	NED	Aron Winter
FW	CRO	Alen Bokšić
FW	ITA	Pierluigi Casiraghi
FW	ITA	Giuseppe Signori

=== Transfers ===
In
Pos.	Name	from	Type
FW	Pierluigi Casiraghi	Juventus	
GK	Luca Marchegiani	Torino	
MF	Roberto Di Matteo	FC Aarau	
DF	Paolo Negro	Brescia Calcio	
MF	Luciano De Paola	Brescia Calcio	
MF	Fabrizio Di Mauro	Fiorentina	loan
FW	Giampaolo Saurini	Brescia Calcio	

Out
Pos.	Name	To	Type
GK	Valerio Fiori	Cagliari Calcio	
GK	Flavio Roma	Mantova	loan
DF	Angelo Gregucci	Torino	
MF	Giovanni Stroppa	Foggia Calcio	
FW	Maurizio Neri	Brescia Calcio	
FW	Karl-Heinz Riedle	Borussia Dortmund	

==== Winter ====
In
Pos.	Name	from	Type
FW	Alen Bokšić	Olympique Marseille	

Out
Pos.	Name	To	Type
GK	Giorgio Frezzolini	Cerveteri	loan
MF	Luciano De Paola	Atalanta B.C.	
MF	Thomas Doll	Eintracht Frankfurt	loan
MF	Dario Marcolin	Cagliari Calcio	loan
FW	Giampaolo Saurini	Atalanta B.C.	

== Competitions ==
=== Serie A ===
==== League table ====
Pos	Team	Pld	W	D	L	GF	GA	GD	Pts	Qualification or relegation
1	Milan (C)	34	19	12	3	36	15	+21	50	Qualified to Champions League
2	Juventus	34	17	13	4	58	25	+33	47	Qualification to UEFA Cup
3	Lazio	34	17	10	7	55	40	+15	44	Qualification to UEFA Cup
4	Sampdoria	34	18	8	8	64	39	+25	44	Qualification to Cup Winners' Cup
5	Parma	34	17	7	10	50	35	+15	41	Qualification to UEFA Cup

Source: 1993–94 Serie A, RSSSF.com, Soccerway
Rules for classification: 1) Points; 2) Head-to-head points; 3) Head-to-head goal difference; 4) Goal difference; 5) Goals scored; 6) Draw. (Note: Head-to-head record is used only after all the matches between the teams in question have been played).
(C) Champions

==== Results summary ====
Overall								Home						Away					
Pld	W	D	L	GF	GA	GD	Pts	W	D	L	GF	GA	GD	W	D	L	GF	GA	GD
34	17	10	7	55	40	+15	61	12	3	2	34	10	+24	5	7	5	21	30	−9

==== Results by round ====
Round	1	2	3	4	5	6	7	8	9	10	11	12	13	14	15	16	17	18	19	20	21	22	23	24	25	26	27	28	29	30	31	32	33	34
Ground	A	H	A	H	H	A	H	A	H	A	H	A	H	A	H	A	H	H	A	H	A	A	H	A	H	A	H	A	H	A	H	A	H	A
Result	D	D	W	L	D	L	D	W	D	W	W	L	W	D	W	W	D	L	W	L	W	W	W	L	W	W	D	W	D	D	W	L	W	W
Position	9	6	4	8	7	10	10	8	9	7	6	7	6	6	6	5	5	5	4	6	5	5	5	5	5	4	5	4	4	4	4	4	4	4

Source: Competitive matches
A = Away; H = Home; W = Win; D = Draw; L = Loss; = Leader, 1994–95 UEFA Champions League; = 1994–95 UEFA Cup; = 1994–95 Serie B

==== Matches ====
29 August 1993 1	Lazio	0–0	Foggia	Rome
		Report		Stadium: Stadio Olimpico; Attendance: 51,529; Referee: Livio Bazzoli

5 September 1993 2	Reggiana	0–0	Lazio	Reggio Emilia
		Report		Stadium: Stadio Mirabello; Attendance: 13,045; Referee: Piero Ceccarini

8 September 1993 3	Lazio	2–1	Parma	Rome
	Fuser 28'; Cravero 48' (pen.)	Report	Zola 40'	Stadium: Stadio Olimpico; Attendance: 49,585; Referee: Pierluigi Pairetto

12 September 1993 4	Cremonese	1–0	Lazio	Cremona
	Nicolini 19'	Report		Stadium: Stadio Giovanni Zini; Attendance: 11,195; Referee: Pierluigi Collina

19 September 1993 5	Lazio	0–0	Internazionale	Rome
		Report		Stadium: Stadio Olimpico; Attendance: 57,392; Referee: Fabio Baldas

26 September 1993 6	Cagliari	4–1	Lazio	Cagliari
	Matteoli 32'; Cappioli 43'; Dely Valdés 67'; Luís Oliveira 89'	Report	Cravero 36' (pen.)	Stadium: Stadio Sant'Elia; Attendance: 17,301; Referee: Marcello Cardona

3 October 1993 7	Milan	0–0	Lazio	Milan
		Report		Stadium: San Siro; Attendance: 63,279; Referee: Marcello Nicchi

17 October 1993 8	Lazio	1–0	Piacenza	Rome
	Signori 90' (pen.)	Report		Stadium: Stadio Olimpico; Attendance: 41,713; Referee: Salvatore Racalbuto

24 October 1993 9	Roma	1–1	Lazio	Rome
	Piacentini 60'	Report	Di Mauro 78'	Stadium: Stadio Olimpico; Attendance: 70,593; Referee: Pierluigi Pairetto

31 October 1993 10	Lazio	2–1	Udinese	Rome
	Winter 17'; Signori 40'	Report	Branca 60'	Stadium: Stadio Olimpico; Attendance: 40,742; Referee: Francesco Arena

7 November 1993 11	Napoli	1–2	Lazio	Naples
	Fonseca 70'	Report	Favalli 68'; Signori 82' (pen.)	Stadium: Stadio San Paolo; Attendance: 52,234; Referee: Loris Stafoggia

21 November 1993 12	Lazio	1–2	Torino	Rome
	Bokšić 9'	Report	Silenzi 67' (pen.); Gregucci 80'	Stadium: Stadio Olimpico; Attendance: 44,124; Referee: Pierluigi Collina

28 November 1993 13	Lazio	4–0	Genoa	Rome
	Fuser 3'; Signori 51', 76', 82' (pen.)	Report		Stadium: Stadio Olimpico; Attendance: 40,874; Referee: Alfredo Trentalange

5 December 1993 14	Atalanta	1–1	Lazio	Bergamo
	Orlandini 47'	Report	Di Matteo 17'	Stadium: Stadio Atleti Azzurri d'Italia; Attendance: 19,084; Referee: Angelo Amendolia

12 December 1993 15	Lazio	3–1	Juventus	Rome
	Kohler 49' (o.g.); Bokšić 59'; Gascoigne 90'	Report	Fortunato 54'	Stadium: Stadio Olimpico; Attendance: 66,042; Referee: Piero Ceccarini

19 December 1993 16	Lecce	1–2	Lazio	Lecce
	Gazzani 22'	Report	Winter 31'; Casiraghi 90'	Stadium: Stadio Via del Mare; Attendance: 8,433; Referee: Graziano Cesari

2 January 1994 17	Lazio	1–1	Sampdoria	Rome
	Signori 37' (pen.)	Report	Gullit 6'	Stadium: Stadio Olimpico; Attendance: 55,058; Referee: Marcello Nicchi

9 January 1994 18	Foggia	4–1	Lazio	Foggia
	Di Biagio 18'; Cappellini 38', 90'; Mandelli 84'	Report	Bokšić 51'	Stadium: Stadio Pino Zaccheria; Attendance: 19,060; Referee: Alfredo Trentalange

16 January 1994 19	Lazio	2–0	Reggiana	Rome
	Di Matteo 45'; Cravero 50' (pen.)	Report		Stadium: Stadio Olimpico; Attendance: 40,597; Referee: Libero Brignoccoli

23 January 1994 20	Parma	2–0	Lazio	Parma
	Di Chiara 3'; Asprilla 89'	Report		Stadium: Stadio Ennio Tardini; Attendance: 26,309; Referee: Angelo Amendolia

30 January 1994 21	Lazio	4–2	Cremonese	Rome
	Cravero 16'; Casiraghi 35'; Signori 66', 75'	Report	Cristiani 26'; Bergodi 90' (o.g.)	Stadium: Stadio Olimpico; Attendance: 41,551; Referee: Roberto Bettin

6 February 1994 22	Internazionale	1–2	Lazio	Milan
	Sosa 26'	Report	Signori 87' (pen.); Di Matteo 90'	Stadium: San Siro; Attendance: 44,287; Referee: Luciano Luci

13 February 1994 23	Lazio	4–0	Cagliari	Rome
	Signori 24' (pen.), 51', 64'; Gascoigne 88'	Report		Stadium: Stadio Olimpico; Attendance: 44,962; Referee: Fabio Baldas

20 February 1994 24	Lazio	0–1	Milan	Rome
		Report	Massaro 45'	Stadium: Stadio Olimpico; Attendance: 70,854; Referee: Gianni Beschin

27 February 1994 25	Piacenza	1–2	Lazio	Piacenza
	Piovani 59'	Report	Negro 60'; Di Matteo 72'	Stadium: Stadio Galleana; Attendance: 13,629; Referee: Francesco Arena

6 March 1994 26	Lazio	1–0	Roma	Rome
	Signori 6'	Report		Stadium: Stadio Olimpico; Attendance: 69,893; Referee: Luciano Luci

13 March 1994 27	Udinese	2–2	Lazio	Udine
	Borgonovo 23'; Pizzi 29' (pen.)	Report	Winter 24'; Signori 38'	Stadium: Stadio Friuli; Attendance: 16,423; Referee: Stefano Braschi

20 March 1994 28	Lazio	3–0	Napoli	Rome
	Di Mauro 29'; Signori 53'; Bia 54' (o.g.)	Report		Stadium: Stadio Olimpico; Attendance: 48,580; Referee: Graziano Cesari

25 March 1994 29	Torino	1–1	Lazio	Turin
	Francescoli 87'	Report	Casiraghi 73'	Stadium: Stadio Delle Alpi; Attendance: 21,548; Referee: Roberto Bettin

2 April 1994 30	Genoa	1–1	Lazio	Genoa
	Onorati 59'	Report	Signori 62'	Stadium: Stadio Luigi Ferraris; Attendance: 24,567; Referee: Stefano Braschi

9 April 1994 31	Lazio	3–1	Atalanta	Rome
	Signori 66', 76', 90'	Report	Valentini 50'	Stadium: Stadio Olimpico; Attendance: 42,044; Referee: Giacinto Franceschini

17 April 1994 32	Juventus	6–1	Lazio	Turin
	Vialli 7', 73', 83'; Bacci 10' (o.g.); Kohler 14'; R. Baggio 89'	Report	Signori 57'	Stadium: Stadio delle Alpi; Attendance: 39,053; Referee: Salvatore Racalbuto

24 April 1994 33	Lazio	3–0	Lecce	Rome
	Winter 27'; Cravero 45'; Bokšić 77'	Report		Stadium: Stadio Olimpico; Attendance: 44,798; Referee: Gennaro Borriello

29 April 1994 34	Sampdoria	3–4	Lazio	Genoa
	Corino 23' (o.g.); Lombardo 54'; Bertarelli 68'	Report	Casiraghi 21'; Dall'Igna 59' (o.g.); Signori 64', 70'	Stadium: Stadio Luigi Ferraris; Attendance: 26,146; Referee: Fiorenzo Treossi

==== Top scorers ====
- (Italy) Giuseppe Signori 23 (6)
- (Italy) Roberto Cravero 6 (3)
- (Croatia) Alen Bokšić 5
- (Italy) Pierluigi Casiraghi 4
- (Italy) Roberto Di Matteo 4
- (Netherlands) Aron Winter 4

=== Coppa Italia ===
==== Second round ====
6 October 1993 First leg	Lazio	0–2	Avellino	Rome
			Bertuccelli 25', 63'	Stadium: Stadio Olimpico; Attendance: 9,062; Referee: Giancarlo Lana

27 October 1993 Second leg	Avellino	0–0 (2–0 agg.)	Lazio	Avellino
				Stadium: Stadio Partenio; Attendance: 15,383; Referee: Graziano Cesari

=== UEFA Cup ===
==== First round ====
15 September 1993 First leg	Lazio (Italy)	2–0	(Bulgaria) Lokomotiv Plovdiv	Rome, Italy
20:30 CEST (UTC+02:00)	Casiraghi 22'; Cravero 55'	Report		Stadium: Stadio Olimpico; Attendance: 48,012; Referee: Michał Listkiewicz (Poland)

29 September 1993 Second leg	Lokomotiv Plovdiv (Bulgaria)	0–2 (0–4 agg.)	(Italy) Lazio	Plovdiv, Bulgaria
13:30 CEST (UTC+02:00)		Report	Luzardi 22'; Cravero 66'	Stadium: Stadion Lokomotiv; Attendance: 27,136; Referee: Éric Blareau (Belgium)

==== Second round ====
20 October 1993 First leg	Lazio (Italy)	1–0	(Portugal) Boavista	Rome, Italy
20:30 CEST (UTC+02:00)	Winter 15'	Report		Stadium: Stadio Olimpico; Attendance: 34,250; Referee: Arie Frost (Israel)

4 November 1993 Second leg	Boavista (Portugal)	2–0 (2–1 agg.)	(Italy) Lazio	Porto, Portugal
21:30 CET (UTC+01:00)	Ricky 21', 56'	Report		Stadium: Estádio do Bessa; Attendance: 7,000; Referee: Erman Toroğlu (Turkey)

== Statistics ==
=== Players statistics ===
No.	Pos	Nat	Player	Total		Serie A		Coppa		UEFA	
No.	Pos	Nat	Player	Apps	Goals	Apps	Goals	Apps	Goals	Apps	Goals
	GK	(Italy) ITA	Marchegiani	40	-44	34	-40	2	-2	4	-2
	DF	(Italy) ITA	Negro	26	1	22+1	1	1	0	2	0
	DF	(Italy) ITA	Bonomi	24	0	21+1	0	1	0	1	0
	DF	(Italy) ITA	Cravero	32	7	29	5	1	0	2	2
	DF	(Italy) ITA	Bacci	33	0	27+2	0	0	0	4	0
	DF	(Italy) ITA	Favalli	25	1	21+2	1	0	0	2	0
	MF	(Italy) ITA	Fuser	31	2	26+2	2	1	0	2	0
	MF	(Netherlands) NED	Winter	40	5	34	4	2	0	4	1
	MF	(Switzerland) SUI	Di Matteo	35	4	27+2	4	2	0	4	0
	FW	(Italy) ITA	Signori	28	23	24	23	1	0	3	0
	FW	(Croatia) CRO	Boksic	21	4	21	4				
	GK	(Italy) ITA	Orsi	0	0	0	0	0	0	0	0
	FW	(Italy) ITA	Casiraghi	31	5	20+6	4	2	0	3	1
	MF	(England) ENG	Gascoigne	17	2	17	2				
		(Italy) ITA	Di Mauro	25	2	12+9	2	0	0	4	0
	DF	(Italy) ITA	Luzardi	20	1	12+2	0	2	0	4	1
	MF	(Germany) GER	Doll	14	0	12+1	0	0	0	1	0
	DF	(Italy) ITA	Bergodi	18	0	9+5	0	1	0	3	0
		(Italy) ITA	De Paola	11	0	2+4	0	2	0	3	0
		(Italy) ITA	Corino	2	0	1+1	0				
		(Italy) ITA	Cristiano	1	0	0+1	0				
	FW	(Italy) ITA	Di Vaio	2	0	0	0	1	0	1	0
	GK	(Italy) ITA	Frezzolini								
	FW	(Italy) ITA	Ianuzzi	1	0	0	0	1	0		
	MF	(Italy) ITA	Marcolin	8	0	1+3	0	2	0	2	0
	DF	(Italy) ITA	Nesta	2	0	0+2	0				
	MF	(Italy) ITA	Saurini	4	0	0+1	0	2	0	1	0
		(Italy) ITA	Sclosa	9	0	2+5	0	2	0		

- Source: http://calcio-seriea.net/presenze/1993/1060/
