= 1988–89 SS Lazio season =

Lazio
1988–89 season
- Owner: Gianmarco Calleri
- Chairman: Gianmarco Calleri
- Manager: Giuseppe Materazzi
- Stadium: Stadio Olimpico
- Serie A: 10th
- Coppa Italia: Quarter-finals
- Top goalscorer: League: Rubén Sosa (8); All: Rubén Sosa (12)
Home colours

The 1988–89 season was the 89th season in the existence of SS Lazio and the club's first season in the top flight of Italian football after they returned after three years. In addition to the domestic league, Lazio participated in this season's edition of the Coppa Italia.

== Squad ==
Note: Flags indicate national team as defined under FIFA eligibility rules; some limited exceptions apply. Players may hold more than one non-FIFA nationality.

Pos.	Nation	Player
GK	ITA	Valerio Fiori
GK	ITA	Silvano Martina
DF	ITA	Paolo Beruatto
DF	ITA	Luca Brunetti
DF	ITA	Antonio Delucca
DF	ITA	Angelo Gregucci
DF	URU	Nelson Gutiérrez
DF	ITA	Raimondo Marino
DF	ITA	Marco Monti
DF	ITA	Massimo Piscedda
MF	ITA	Antonio Elia Acerbis
MF	ITA	Giancarlo Camolese

Pos.	Nation	Player
MF	ITA	Luigi Di Biagio
MF	ITA	Cristiano Di Loreto
MF	ITA	Alfonso Greco
MF	ITA	Andrea Icardi
MF	ITA	Ciro Muro
MF	ITA	Gabriele Pin
MF	ITA	Gabriele Savino
MF	ITA	Claudio Sclosa
FW	ARG	Gustavo Dezotti
FW	ITA	Paolo Di Canio
FW	ITA	Antonio Rizzolo
FW	URU	Rubén Sosa

== Competitions ==
=== Serie A ===
==== League table ====
Pos	Team	Pld	W	D	L	GF	GA	GD	Pts
8	Roma	34	11	12	11	33	40	−7	34
9	Lecce	34	8	15	11	25	35	−10	31
10	Lazio	34	5	19	10	23	32	−9	29
11	Hellas Verona	34	5	19	10	18	27	−9	29
12	Ascoli	34	9	11	14	30	41	−11	29

Source: 1988–89 Serie A, RSSSF.com
Rules for classification: 1) Points; 2) Head-to-head points; 3) Head-to-head goal difference; 4) Goal difference; 5) Goals scored; 6) Draw.

==== Results summary ====
Overall								Home						Away					
Pld	W	D	L	GF	GA	GD	Pts	W	D	L	GF	GA	GD	W	D	L	GF	GA	GD
34	5	19	10	23	32	−9	34	5	10	2	14	11	+3	0	9	8	9	21	−12

==== Results by round ====
Round	1	2	3	4	5	6	7	8	9	10	11	12	13	14	15	16	17	18	19	20	21	22	23	24	25	26	27	28	29	30	31	32	33	34
Ground	A	H	A	H	A	H	A	H	A	H	A	A	H	A	H	A	H	H	A	H	A	H	A	H	A	H	A	H	H	A	H	A	H	A
Result	D	D	D	D	D	W	D	L	L	D	D	L	W	L	D	L	D	D	L	D	L	D	D	D	L	D	D	W	W	D	L	L	W	D
Position	8	7	9	9	8	6	5	8	9	9	8	9	9	9	9	9	10	11	12	12	12	12	12	13	14	14	13	12	10	10	11	14	13	10

Source: Competitive matches
A = Away; H = Home; W = Win; D = Draw; L = Loss; = 1988–89 European Cup; = 1988–89 UEFA Cup; = 1988–89 Serie B

==== Matches ====
9 October 1988 1	Cesena	0–0	Lazio	Cesena
		Report		Stadium: Stadio Dino Manuzzi; Attendance: 16,164; Referee: Angelo Amendolia

16 October 1988 2	Lazio	1–1	Torino	Rome
	Gregucci 45'	Report	Pin 45' (o.g.)	Stadium: Stadio Olimpico; Attendance: 26,796; Referee: Mauro Felicani

23 October 1988 3	Milan	0–0	Lazio	Milan
		Report		Stadium: San Siro; Attendance: 41,612; Referee: Carlo Sguizzato

30 October 1988 4	Lazio	1–1	Como	Rome
	Dezotti 42' (pen.)	Report	Giunta 68'	Stadium: Stadio Olimpico; Attendance: 34,022; Referee: Werter Cornieti

6 November 1988 5	Napoli	1–1	Lazio	Naples
	Carnevale 28'	Report	Rizzolo 66'	Stadium: Stadio San Paolo; Attendance: 60,523; Referee: Moreno Frigerio

20 November 1988 6	Lazio	3–1	Hellas Verona	Rome
	Rizzolo 1', 52'; Pin 79'	Report	Caniggia 31'	Stadium: Stadio Olimpico; Attendance: 25,500; Referee: Bruno Di Cola

27 November 1988 7	Bologna	0–0	Lazio	Bologna
		Report		Stadium: Stadio Renato Dall'Ara; Attendance: 19,710; Referee: Fabio Baldas

4 December 1988 8	Lazio	0–1	Atalanta	Rome
		Report	Stromberg 60'	Stadium: Stadio Olimpico; Attendance: 27,603; Referee: Romeo Paparesta

11 December 1988 9	Lecce	1–0	Lazio	Lecce
	Baroni 60'	Report		Stadium: Stadio Via del Mare; Attendance: 15,822; Referee: Moreno Frigerio

18 December 1988 10	Lazio	2–2	Pescara	Rome
	Gregucci 5' (yellow card) (yellow-red card) 73'; Sosa 25'	Report	Tita 53', 65'	Stadium: Stadio Olimpico; Attendance: 22,053; Referee: Carlo Sguizzato

31 December 1988 11	Pisa	1–1	Lazio	Pisa
	Incociatti 36'	Report	Sosa 86'	Stadium: Arena Garibaldi; Attendance: 11,121; Referee: Bruno Di Cola

8 January 1989 12	Fiorentina	3–0	Lazio	Florence
	Borgonovo 18'; Salvatori 57'; Baggio 87'	Report		Stadium: Stadio Comunale; Attendance: 20,376; Referee: Pierluigi Magni

15 January 1989 13	Lazio	1–0	Roma	Rome
	Di Canio 25'	Report		Stadium: Stadio Olimpico; Attendance: 44,056; Referee: Pietro D'Elia

22 January 1989 14	Internazionale	1–0	Lazio	Milan
	Mandorlini 40'	Report		Stadium: San Siro; Attendance: 40,385; Referee: Mauro Felicani

29 January 1989 15	Lazio	0–0	Juventus	Rome
		Report		Stadium: Stadio Olimpico; Attendance: 45,532; Referee: Pierluigi Magni

5 February 1989 16	Sampdoria	1–0	Lazio	Genoa
	Mancini 44'	Report		Stadium: Stadio Luigi Ferraris; Attendance: 17,301; Referee: Luciano Luci

12 February 1989 17	Lazio	0–0	Ascoli	Rome
		Report		Stadium: Stadio Olimpico; Attendance: 22,560; Referee: Arcangello Pezzella

19 February 1989 18	Lazio	0–0	Cesena	Rome
		Report		Stadium: Stadio Olimpico; Attendance: 26,302; Referee: Pietro D'Elia

26 February 1989 19	Torino	4–3	Lazio	Turin
	Rossi 19'; Cravero 25' (pen.); Škoro 46'; Müller 75'	Report	Pin 13'; Sosa 50'; Škoro 54' (o.g.)	Stadium: Stadio Comunale; Attendance: 22,043; Referee: Bruno Di Cola

5 March 1989 20	Lazio	1–1	Milan	Rome
	Sosa 35' (pen.)	Report	van Basten 24'	Stadium: Stadio Olimpico; Attendance: 41,612; Referee: Luigi Agnolin

12 March 1989 21	Como	2–1	Lazio	Como
	Giunta 5'; Maccoppi 90'	Report	Gutierrez 57'	Stadium: Stadio Giuseppe Sinigaglia; Attendance: 8,320; Referee: Pierluigi Pairetto

19 March 1989 22	Lazio	1–1	Napoli	Rome
	Sosa 31'	Report	Neri 19'	Stadium: Stadio Olimpico; Attendance: 37,348; Referee: Tullio Lanese

2 April 1989 23	Hellas Verona	0–0	Lazio	Verona
		Report		Stadium: Stadio Marcantonio Bentegodi; Attendance: 21,488; Referee: Moreno Frigerio

9 April 1989 24	Lazio	0–0	Bologna	Rome
		Report		Stadium: Stadio Olimpico; Attendance: 31,490; Referee: Angelo Amendolia

16 April 1989 25	Atalanta	3–1	Lazio	Bergamo
	Piscedda 28'; Barcella 40'; Pasciullo 68'	Report	Sosa 61'	Stadium: Stadio Comunale; Attendance: 19,313; Referee: Luciano Luci

30 April 1989 26	Lazio	0–0	Lecce	Rome
		Report		Stadium: Stadio Olimpico; Attendance: 28,620; Referee: Pietro D'Elia

7 May 1989 27	Pescara	0–0	Lazio	Pescara
		Report		Stadium: Stadio Adriatico; Attendance: 20,437; Referee: Luigi Agnolin

14 May 1989 28	Lazio	1–0	Pisa	Rome
	Gregucci 72'	Report		Stadium: Stadio Olimpico; Attendance: 27,605; Referee: Arcangello Pezzella

21 May 1989 29	Lazio	1–0	Fiorentina	Rome
	Sosa 57' (pen.)	Report		Stadium: Stadio Olimpico; Attendance: 22,359; Referee: Moreno Frigerio

28 May 1989 30	Roma	0–0	Lazio	Rome
		Report		Stadium: Stadio Olimpico; Attendance: 60,288; Referee: Pietro D'Elia

4 June 1989 31	Lazio	1–3	Internazionale	Rome
	Dezotti 53'	Report	Bergomi 68'; Díaz 79', 84'	Stadium: Stadio Olimpico; Attendance: 49,046; Referee: Angelo Amendolia

11 June 1989 32	Juventus	4–2	Lazio	Turin
	Buso 21', 79'; Piscedda 58' (o.g.); De Agostini 66'	Report	Gregucci 17'; Sosa 42'	Stadium: Stadio Comunale; Attendance: 21,514; Referee: Pierluigi Magni

18 June 1989 33	Lazio	1–0	Sampdoria	Rome
	Dezotti 37'	Report		Stadium: Stadio Flaminio; Attendance: 23,942; Referee: Arcangello Pezzella

25 June 1989 34	Ascoli	0–0	Lazio	Ascoli Piceno
		Report		Stadium: Stadio Cino e Lillo Del Duca; Attendance: 13,341; Referee: Pietro D'Elia

=== Coppa Italia ===
==== First round (Group 3) ====
Pos	Team	Pld	W	D	L	GF	GA	GD	Pts
1	Milan	5	4	1	0	10	4	+6	9
2	Pescara	5	4	0	1	11	7	+4	8
3	Lazio	5	3	0	2	11	7	+4	6
4	Messina	5	1	1	3	12	13	−1	3
5	Campobasso	5	1	0	4	5	10	−5	2
6	Licata	5	1	0	4	5	13	−8	2

21 August 1988 1	Pescara	2–1	Lazio	Pescara
	Bruno 31'; Marchegiani 69'		Dezotti 6'	Stadium: Stadio Adriatico; Referee: Werther Cornieti

24 August 1988 2	Lazio	3–0	Licata	Rome
	Sosa 67' (pen.), 81'; Rizzolo 79'			Stadium: Stadio Flaminio; Attendance: 10,000; Referee: Marcello Nicchi

28 August 1988 3	Lazio	2–0	Campobasso	Rome
	Di Canio 69'; Dezotti 78'			Stadium: Stadio Flaminio; Attendance: 12,000; Referee: Giuseppe Bailo

30 August 1988 4	Messina	3–4	Lazio	Messina
	Modica 38'; S. Schillaci 51' (pen.); Cambiaghi 63'		Marino 21'; Dezotti 58', 78'; Sosa 67'	Stadium: Stadio Giovanni Celeste; Attendance: 12,000; Referee: Arcangelo Pezzella

3 September 1988 5	Milan	2–1	Lazio	Monza
	Mannari 11'; Cappellini 28'		Rizzolo 42'	Stadium: Stadio Brianteo; Attendance: 15,000; Referee: Pietro D'Elia

==== Second round (Group 5) ====
Pos	Team	Pld	W	D	L	GF	GA	GD	Pts
1	Lazio	3	2	1	0	3	1	+2	5
2	Fiorentina	3	2	0	1	7	4	+3	4
3	Internazionale	3	0	2	1	5	6	−1	2
4	Udinese	3	0	1	2	1	5	−4	1

14 September 1988 1	Lazio	1–0	Fiorentina	Rome
	Dezotti 26'			Stadium: Stadio Flaminio; Attendance: 21,390; Referee: Pierluigi Pairetto

21 September 1988 2	Lazio	1–1	Internazionale	Rome
	Dezotti 1'		Bianchi 6'	Stadium: Stadio Flaminio; Attendance: 27,108; Referee: Luigi Agnolin

28 September 1988 3	Udinese	0–1	Lazio	Udine
			Sosa 57'	Stadium: Stadio Friuli; Attendance: 2,000; Referee: Pierluigi Magni

==== Quarter-finals ====
4 January 1989 First leg	Atalanta	2–0	Lazio	Bergamo
	Serioli 59'; Evair 76' (pen.)			Stadium: Stadio Comunale; Attendance: 11,312; Referee: Arcangelo Pezzella

25 January 1989 Second leg	Lazio	3–2 (3–4 agg.)	Atalanta	Rome
	Marino 16'; Gregucci 49'; G. Pin 82'		Madonna 41', 56'	Stadium: Stadio Olimpico; Attendance: 16,401; Referee: Carlo Sguizzato
