= Cristiano Bergodi =

Italian footballer (born 1964)

Personal information
- Date of birth: 14 October 1964 (age 62)
- Place of birth: Bracciano, Italy
- Height: 1.88 m (6 ft 2 in)
- Position: Centre-back

Team information
- Current team: Universitatea Cluj (head coach)

Youth career
- 1975–1978: Lazio
- 1979–1980: Casalotti
- 1980–1984: Pescara

Senior career*
Years	Team	Apps	(Gls)
1984–1989	Pescara	97	(0)
1989–1996	Lazio	160	(4)
1996–1999	Padova	43	(1)
1999–2000	Sliema Wanderers	18	(1)
Total		318	(6)

Managerial career
- 2002–2003: Imolese
- 2003–2004: Sassuolo
- 2004: Lazio (assistant)
- 2005: Lecce (assistant)
- 2005–2006: Naţional București
- 2006–2007: CFR Cluj
- 2007: Rapid București
- 2009: Politehnica Iași
- 2009: Steaua București
- 2010–2011: Modena
- 2012: Modena
- 2012–2013: Pescara
- 2013–2014: Brescia
- 2015: Rapid București
- 2015: ASA Târgu Mureș
- 2016: Modena
- 2018–2020: Voluntari
- 2020: Universitatea Craiova
- 2021–2023: Sepsi OSK
- 2023–2024: Rapid București
- 2025–: Universitatea Cluj
- * Club domestic league appearances and goals

Cristiano Bergodi (born 14 October 1964) is an Italian professional football manager and former player, currently in charge of Liga I club Universitatea Cluj.

== Club career ==
Born in Bracciano, Lazio, Bergodi started to play at Pescara Calcio in the country's first division (Serie A) in 1987, for Pescara Calcio, playing with a total of eight seasons.

He most notably played for Lazio, where he spent seven seasons in the top flight, and retired in 2000 after a brief stint at Maltese club Sliema Wanderers.

== Managerial career ==
After he retired, Bergodi started working as a coach. After a couple of minor league experiences in Italy, he moved into Romanian football, initially with National București, before achieving his first major successes as Rapid București manager, winning the Romanian Supercup on 27 July 2007. He also coached Liga I team CFR Cluj during the 2006–07 season, achieving a place in UEFA Cup.

On 6 October 2007, shortly after Rapid was eliminated from the UEFA Cup in first round, Bergodi resigned, declaring Rapid was "a club of amateurs".

In January 2009, after a break, he signed a half year contract with an extension for another two years with Liga I club Politehnica Iași.

In June 2009, after his short stint with Politehnica Iași he was appointed Steaua Bucharest's new manager. He replaced Marius Lăcătuș. On 18 September 2009, Bergodi was sacked by Gigi Becali for not allowing him to join the team in the locker at the half-time of the match between Steaua and Sheriff Tiraspol (0–0). Becali's decision attracted extremely negative critics from Steaua fans.

In July 2010 he was presented as new head coach of Italian Serie B club Modena. On 14 November 2011, he was sacked. On 26 February 2012, he was recalled by the same team as head coach.

On 20 November 2012 he, already former player of Pescara for a total of eight seasons, was named new coach of same club, now in Serie A en place of the resigned Giovanni Stroppa.

He returned to Rapid București in April 2015. He tried to help them avoid relegation, but he was unable to do it. Between September and December 2015, he coached Târgu Mureș.

He successively served as head coach of Modena in the Serie B league from March to June 2016, failing to save the club from relegation.

On 8 November 2018, he returned to Romania and took control of Voluntari. He was sacked in January 2020. On 8 May 2020, he signed a one-year contract with Universitatea Craiova.

On 8 October 2021, he took charge of Liga I club Sepsi OSK. He won the Cupa României in 2022, defeating defending champions, and former employers, CFR Cluj, in the final. Sepsi OSK also beat the same opposition to win the Supecupa României in 2022.

== Career statistics ==
=== Club ===
Appearances and goals by club, season and competition
Club	Season	League			Coppa Italia		Europe		Other		Total	
Club	Season	Division	Apps	Goals	Apps	Goals	Apps	Goals	Apps	Goals	Apps	Goals
Pescara	1984–85	Serie B	2	0	0	0	–		–		2	0
Pescara	1985–86	Serie B	1	0	1	0	–		–		2	0
Pescara	1986–87	Serie B	34	0	5	0	–		–		39	0
Pescara	1987–88	Serie A	29	0	6	0	–		–		35	0
Pescara	1988–89	Serie A	31	0	5	0	–		–		36	0
Pescara	Total		97	0	17	0	–		–		114	0
Lazio	1989–90	Serie A	32	1	2	0	–		–		34	1
Lazio	1990–91	Serie A	33	0	1	0	–		–		34	0
Lazio	1991–92	Serie A	26	1	3	0	–		–		29	1
Lazio	1992–93	Serie A	16	1	1	0	–		–		17	1
Lazio	1993–94	Serie A	14	0	1	0	3 (Note: Appearances in UEFA Cup)	0	–		18	0
Lazio	1994–95	Serie A	24	1	5	0	4	0	–		33	1
Lazio	1995–96	Serie A	15	0	3	0	3	0	–		21	0
Lazio	Total		160	4	16	0	10	0	–		186	4
Padova	1996–97	Serie B	30	0	0	0	–		–		30	0
Padova	1997–98	Serie B	13	1	1	0	–		–		14	1
Padova	1998–99	Serie C1	0	0	0	0	–		0	0	0	0
Padova	Total		43	1	1	0	–		0	0	44	1
Sliema Wanderers	1999–00	Maltese Premier League	18	1	?	?	2	0	–		20	1
Career total			318	6	33	0	10	0	0	0	361	6

== Managerial statistics ==
As of 7 November 2026

Managerial record by club and tenure
Team	Country	From	To	Record				
Team	Country	From	To	M	W	D	L	Win %
Imolese	(Italy)	27 December 2002	30 June 2003	19	8	5	6	42.11
Sassuolo	(Italy)	25 November 2003	30 June 2004	24	6	7	11	25.00
Național București	(Romania)	18 November 2005	30 June 2006	22	8	6	8	36.36
CFR Cluj	(Romania)	5 October 2006	25 May 2007	26	16	4	6	61.54
Rapid București	(Romania)	1 July 2007	8 October 2007	14	7	7	0	50.00
Politehnica Iași	(Romania)	19 January 2009	15 June 2009	17	6	3	8	35.29
Steaua București	(Romania)	1 July 2009	18 September 2009	14	10	1	3	71.43
Modena	(Italy)	12 July 2010	14 November 2011	61	18	24	19	29.51
Modena	(Italy)	26 February 2012	30 June 2012	15	7	5	3	46.67
Pescara	(Italy)	20 November 2012	3 March 2013	15	3	1	11	20.00
Brescia	(Italy)	30 September 2013	3 March 2014	20	7	9	4	35.00
Rapid București	(Romania)	15 April 2015	1 June 2015	8	3	2	3	37.50
ASA Târgu Mureș	(Romania)	22 September 2015	17 December 2015	15	5	7	3	33.33
Modena	(Italy)	28 March 2016	30 June 2016	9	1	4	4	11.11
Voluntari	(Romania)	8 November 2018	6 January 2020	49	10	14	25	20.41
Universitatea Craiova	(Romania)	7 May 2020	9 November 2020	18	14	0	4	77.78
Sepsi OSK	(Romania)	10 October 2021	8 June 2023	84	40	19	25	47.62
Rapid București	(Romania)	10 July 2023	16 April 2024	37	16	12	9	43.24
Universitatea Cluj	(Romania)	23 October 2025	present	55	32	11	12	58.18
Total				522	217	141	164	41.57

== Honours ==
=== Player ===
Pescara

- Serie B: 1986–87

Sliema Wanderers

- Maltese Cup: 1999–2000

=== Coach ===
Național București

- Cupa României runner-up: 2005–06

Rapid București

- Supercupa României: 2007

Sepsi OSK

- Cupa României: 2021–22, 2022–23
- Supercupa României: 2022

Universitatea Cluj

- Cupa României runner-up: 2025–26
- Supercupa României runner-up: 2026

Individual

- Gazeta Sporturilor Romania Coach of the Month: May 2022, July 2022
