= Berardino Capocchiano =

Italian association footballer (born 1965)

Personal information
- Date of birth: 16 August 1965 (age 60)
- Place of birth: Zapponeta, Italy
- Height: 1.85 m (6 ft 1 in)
- Position: Forward

Senior career*
Years	Team	Apps	(Gls)
–1987	Carugatese		
1987–1989	TSV Havelse		
1989–1990	Arminia Bielefeld		
1990–1991	TSV Havelse	35	(14)
1991	1860 Munich	0	(0)
1991–1992	Lazio	2	(0)
1992–1996	Bari	27	(4)
1994	→ Avellino (loan)	0	(0)
1994–1996	→ Chieti (loan)	59	(13)
1996–1997	Latina	7	(2)
1997–1998	Rondinella	9	(2)
- * Club domestic league appearances and goals

Berardino Capocchiano (born 16 August 1965) is an Italian former footballer who played as a forward.

Capocchiano grew up in Italy, but moved to West Germany for personal reasons in 1987. He played for TSV Havelse and Arminia Bielefeld in Germany before transferring to Serie A club Lazio in 1991, where he appeared in 2 league matches. He subsequently played for Bari, Avellino, Chieti, Latina and Rondinella.

== Playing career ==
Born and raised in Zapponeta, Capacchiano began his career in Italy, playing for amateur side Carugatese. He moved to West Germany in 1987 for family reasons, and signed for third-tier TSV Havelse shortly after. He joined Arminia Bielefeld in 1989 before returning to Havelse a year later, now in the 2. Bundesliga. After 14 goals in 35 league games for Havelse during the 1990–91 season, Capocchiano transferred to TSV 1860 Munich for a reported fee of 140,000 Deutsche Marks in July 1991. However, Capocchiano never played for 1860 Munich - he terminated his contract shortly after signing for the club in order to sign for Serie A club Lazio, whilst having reportedly told 1860 Munich that he had to go to Italy to look after his mother and sister. The transfer was subject to a complaint by 1860 Munich president Helmut Schmitz to the DFB and FIFA, with Lazio paying 70,000 marks as a result in addition to the 140,000 they initially paid according to 1860 Munich. The protracted nature of the transfer also left Capocchiano unavailable for Lazio until November. He made his debut for the club on 4 December 1991 as a substitute against Torino in the Coppa Italia, and in total made just 2 league appearances for the club.

In the summer of 1992, Capocchiano signed for Serie B club Bari on a five-year contract. Across the 1992–93 season, Capocchiano scored 4 goals in 21 games, whilst he failed to score in 6 appearances during the 1993–94 season, leading to criticism of his performances for the club and the nickname "Pibe de piombo" ("lead pipe") being coined for him by comedy duo Toti e Tata. He subsequently had spells on loan at Avellino, where he made no appearances, and Chieti, where he scored 13 goals in 59 league games. After leaving Bari in 1996, played for amateur sides Latina, scoring twice in 7 matches and Rondinella, scoring twice in 9 games.

== After football ==
Since his football career, Capocchiano has become an entrepreneur - he is the owner of the Coesi Group. He attempted to purchase Piacenza Calcio 1919 in 2011, but later decided against the purchase given the clubs financial condition.

Capocchiano also unsuccessfully ran for office as a councillor for the newly formed Province of Monza and Brianza in 2009.
