= Davide Olivares =

Italian footballer (born 1971)

Personal information
- Date of birth: 21 June 1971 (age 55)
- Place of birth: Vigevano, Italy
- Height: 1.78 m (5 ft 10 in)
- Position: Midfielder

Youth career
- Inter Milan
- Abbiategrasso

Senior career*
Years	Team	Apps	(Gls)
1988–1989	Virescit Bergamo	9	(1)
1989–1990	Lazio	2	(0)
1990–1992	Virescit Bergamo	61	(6)
1992–1994	SPAL	45	(3)
1994–1996	Bologna	60	(6)
1996–2000	Bari	70	(4)
2000–2001	Lecce	2	(0)
2001–2002	Como	17	(5)
2002–2003	Lucchese	26	(2)
2003–2004	Giulianova	19	(0)
2004–2005	Calangianus	28	(6)
2005–2006	Aprilla	29	(6)
2006–2007	Anziolavinio	7	(0)
2007	Aprilla	19	(3)
2007–2009	Guamo		
2009–2011	Valfreddana 2000		
2011–2012	Massa Macinaia		
2012–2013	Atletico Lucca 1970		
2013	Valfreddana 2000		
2013–2015	Atletico Lucca 1970		
2016	Virtus Abbiatense		
Total		394	(42)

Managerial career
- 2016–2019: Virtus Abbiatense
- * Club domestic league appearances and goals

Davide Olivares (born 21 June 1971) is an Italian former professional footballer who played as a midfielder.

== Career ==
Having spent time in the youth sectors of Inter Milan, Olivares began his career with Virescit Bergamo in Serie C1. After being scouted in Interregionale matches, he was taken to Lazio, where he made just two appearances, returning to Virescit Bergamo. He later played for SPAL and Bologna, where he won two consecutive titles, reaching Serie A again. Olivares also had a notable spell at Bari, where he played for four seasons in Serie A.

In 2001, while playing for Como, Olivares was caught in anti-doping for cocaine use, being suspended for eight months, and returning to play only for Serie C1 and Serie D clubs. He ended his career at Virtus Abbiatense, a team where he also held various other roles as coach of the main and youth squads.

== Honours ==
Bologna

- Serie B: 1995–96
- Serie C1: 1994–95 (group A)

Como

- Serie B: 2001–02
