= Amarildo (footballer, born 1964) =

Brazilian footballer (born 1964)

Personal information
- Full name: Amarildo Souza do Amaral
- Date of birth: 2 October 1964 (age 62)
- Place of birth: Curitiba, Brazil
- Height: 1.85 m (6 ft 1 in)
- Position: Striker

Senior career*
Years	Team	Apps	(Gls)
1982–1983	Toledo Work	?	(12)
1984	Botafogo	8	(1)
1984	Operário-MS	?	(3)
1985	Botafogo	4	(0)
1985	Inter Limeira	?	(3)
1986	XV Piracicaba	?	(4)
1986–1988	Internacional	26	(8)
1988–1989	Celta	34	(16)
1989–1990	Lazio	29	(8)
1990–1992	Cesena	65	(13)
1992	Famalicão	2	(0)
1992–1993	Logroñés	22	(1)
1993–1998	Famalicão	68	(7)
1995	→ União São João (loan)	?	(5)
1995	→ São Paulo (loan)	11	(1)
1996	→ Bahia (loan)	0	(0)
- * Club domestic league appearances and goals

Amarildo Souza do Amaral (born 2 October 1964), known simply as Amarildo, is a Brazilian former footballer who played as a striker.

== Football career ==
Born in Curitiba, Amarildo appeared in his country's Série A for four different teams: Operário Futebol Clube, Botafogo de Futebol e Regatas, Sport Club Internacional and São Paulo FC, the first three early into his career. Botafogo de Futebol e Regatas and Sport Club Internacional. He started playing football with Paraná-based Toledo Colônia Work, in 1982.

In the 1988–89 season Amarildo moved abroad, playing in Spain for Celta de Vigo and scoring 16 goals – fourth-best in La Liga, which included a brace in a 2–0 home win against Real Madrid – as the Galicians finished in tenth position. He spent the following three years in Italy, appearing for S.S. Lazio and A.C. Cesena and suffering Serie A relegation in his second year with the latter side.

After another spell in Spain's top flight with CD Logroñés (only one goal), Amarildo mainly represented F.C. Famalicão in Portugal. His best campaign with the club came in 1993–94 when he netted six times in 19 games in an eventual Primeira Liga relegation; he also represented the team in the second and third levels, interspersed with stints back in his homeland with São Paulo, União São João Esporte Clube and Esporte Clube Bahia, playing one match in the domestic cup with the latter in 1996.
