= Sergio Domini =

Italian footballer (born 1961)

Personal information
- Date of birth: 11 March 1961 (age 65)
- Place of birth: Udine, Italy
- Height: 1.77 m (5 ft 9 1/2 in)
- Position: Midfielder

Senior career*
Years	Team	Apps	(Gls)
1977–1978	SPAL	0	(0)
1978–1979	Argentana		
1979–1981	SPAL	3	(0)
1981–1984	Rondinella	96	(4)
1984–1986	Modena	62	(6)
1986–1987	Genoa	34	(2)
1987–1988	Roma	20	(0)
1988–1990	Cesena	63	(4)
1990–1991	Lazio	21	(0)
1991–1994	Brescia	85	(7)
1994–1995	Lucchese	32	(0)
1995–1996	Baracca Lugo	30	(1)
- * Club domestic league appearances and goals

Sergio Domini (born 11 March 1961 in Udine) is an Italian former professional footballer who played as a midfielder.

He played 5 seasons (130 games, 5 goals) in Serie A for A.S. Roma, A.C. Cesena, S.S. Lazio and Brescia Calcio. He did not make his Serie A debut until the age of 26 after spending his first 8 seasons in the lower leagues.
