= Alessandro Manetti (footballer) =

Italian footballer (born 1972)

Personal information
- Date of birth: 14 June 1972 (age 54)
- Place of birth: Rome, Italy
- Height: 1.67 m (5 ft 6 in)
- Position: Midfielder

Youth career
- –1989: Lazio

Senior career*
Years	Team	Apps	(Gls)
1989–1992	Lazio	0	(0)
1990–1991	→ Mantova (loan)	28	(1)
1992–1993	Acireale	26	(1)
1993–1999	Hellas Verona	171	(8)
1999–2002	Genoa	94	(5)
2002–2004	Venezia	63	(0)
2004–2005	Padova	18	(0)
2005–2007	Alessandria	27	(1)
2007–2008	Derthona	12	(1)
Total		439	(17)

International career
1989	Italy U18	4	(0)

Managerial career
- 2010–2011: Borgorosso Arenzano
- 2015: Rappr.Giovanissimi Liguria
- 2018–2020: Borgorosso Arenzano
- * Club domestic league appearances and goals

Alessandro Manetti (born 14 June 1972), is an Italian former professional footballer who played as a midfielder.

== Career ==
Revealed by Lazio in the same generation as Luigi Di Biagio, Manetti stood out playing most of his career for Hellas Verona, a team where he made 171 appearances and was part of the 1995–96 Serie B promoted and 1998–99 Serie B champion squads. On 16 February 1997, in the 1996–97 Serie A, Manetti scored an important goal against Fiorentina. He also had notable spells with Genoa and Venezia in Serie B.

Manetti had experience as a coach directing Borgorosso Arenzano in 2010–11 Serie D.

== Honours ==
Verona

- Serie B: 1998–99
