= Gianni Beschin =

Italian football referee (1953–2021)

- Born: 15 February 1953; Cologna Veneta, Italy
- Died: 12 February 2021 (aged 67); Corigliano-Rossano, Italy
- Other occupation: Jeweler

Domestic
- Years: League
- 1987–1997: Serie A
- 1987–1997: Serie B

Gianni Beschin (15 February 1953 – 12 February 2021) was an Italian football referee.

== Biography ==
Beschin became a member of the Associazione Italiana Arbitri (AIA) in 1973. With his primary occupation being a jeweler, he joined the Commissione Arbitri Nazionale in 1987 and refereed his first Serie A match in November 1988, Atalanta B.C. vs. Delfino Pescara 1936. In 1989, he won the Giorgio Bernardi Award, given to a promising young official in Serie A. In 1992, he was awarded the Giovanni Mauro Prize, the highest award he would receive in his career.

Beschin rose to fame in 1993 thanks to an appearance on a promotional video for TELE+. However, his career slowly declined after 1995, with two one-month-long suspensions during the 1996–97 season, both for violating strict AIA policy on bringing a significant other to a match. He resigned in May 1997. He was a manager for Cosenza Calcio from 1998 to 2001 and for S.P.A.L. in 2002.

Gianni Beschin died following a sudden illness in Corigliano-Rossano on 12 February 2021, at the age of 67, three days short from his 68th birthday.
