= Gianmarco Calleri =

Italian footballer, entrepreneur and sports functionary (1942–2023)

Gianmarco Calleri (10 January 1942 – 8 March 2023) was an Italian footballer, entrepreneur and sports functionary.

Calleri was born in Busalla on 10 January 1942. A professional football player, he was a pupil of the Piedmontese team G.S. Bacigalupo. He played for the Novara Calcio and S.S. Monza 1912. The whole season was considered a player S.S. Lazio, but never made his debut in the first team.

Calleri was President of U.S. Alessandria Calcio 1912 (1983–1985), S.S. Lazio (1986–1992), Torino F.C. (1994–1997), and AC Bellinzona (1998–2001).

Calleri died on 8 March 2023, at the age of 81.
