= Fernando Orsi =

Italian footballer and manager

Personal information
- Date of birth: 12 September 1959 (age 67)
- Place of birth: Rome, Italy
- Height: 1.80 m (5 ft 11 in)
- Position: Goalkeeper

Senior career*
Years	Team	Apps	(Gls)
1978–1979	A.S. Roma	0	(0)
1979–1980	Siena	34	(0)
1980–1982	Parma	51	(0)
1982–1985	Lazio	82	(0)
1985–1989	Arezzo	125	(0)
1989–1998	Lazio	43	(0)

Managerial career
- 1999–2001: Lazio (goalkeeper coach)
- 2002–2004: Lazio (assistant coach)
- 2004–2006: Inter (assistant coach)
- 2007: Livorno
- 2008: Livorno
- 2010–2011: Ternana
- * Club domestic league appearances and goals

Fernando "Nando" Orsi (born 12 September 1959 in Rome) is an Italian football manager and former player, who played as a goalkeeper.

== Playing career ==
After starting out at Roma, Orsi, a former goalkeeper, made his professional debut in 1979 for Serie C2 club Siena. The following season he moved to Parma, where he remained for two seasons. He subsequently joined Lazio, where he made his Serie A debut in 1982, a team for which he played from 1982 to 1985, and again, as backup keeper to Valerio Fiori and later Luca Marchegiani, from 1989 until his retirement in 1998. Between his two spells at Lazio, he also spent four seasons (1985 to 1989) in the lower divisions of Italian football with Arezzo.

== Coaching career ==
Orsi became assistant coach of Roberto Mancini at Lazio in 2002. He followed Mancini at Inter Milan two years later. He left Inter in 2006 in order to pursue a career as head coach. Initially rumoured as possible Arezzo coach in 2006–07, he was surprisingly appointed to a Serie A job on 21 March 2007 by Livorno chairman Aldo Spinelli in order to replace Daniele Arrigoni. He made his debut with a 4–1 home win to Catania on 1 April, leading his side to a mid-table finish in the 2006–07 Serie A season. However, a disappointing start to the 2007–08 league campaign resulted in only two points after the first seven matchdays, convincing Spinelli to sack Orsi on 9 October, making him the first coach to be fired in the season. He was called back at the helm of the amaranto on 28 April 2008, after Spinelli decided to dismiss Giancarlo Camolese from the team's head coaching post, but did not manage to save his club from relegation to Serie B.

He then served as head coach of Lega Pro Prima Divisione club Ternana from October 2010 to February 2011.
