= Roberto Soldà =

Italian footballer and coach

Personal information
- Date of birth: 28 May 1959 (age 67)
- Place of birth: Valdagno, Italy
- Height: 1.79 m (5 ft 10 1/2 in)
- Position: Defender

Senior career*
Years	Team	Apps	(Gls)
1978–1980	Ravenna	46	(0)
1980–1981	Forlì	29	(3)
1981–1983	Como	48	(0)
1983–1986	Atalanta	81	(4)
1986–1987	Juventus	16	(0)
1987–1989	Verona	56	(0)
1989–1992	Lazio	88	(0)
1992–1993	Monza	27	(2)

Managerial career
- 1993–1994: Chiasso
- 1997–1998: Montichiari
- * Club domestic league appearances and goals

Roberto Soldà (born 28 May 1959) is an Italian professional football coach and former player from Valdagno.
