= Giovanni Stroppa =

Italian football manager (born 1968)

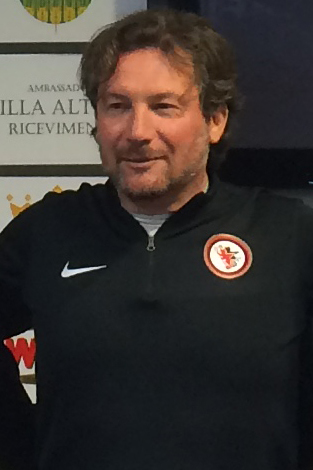
- Stroppa as head coach of Foggia in 2017

Personal information
- Full name: Giovanni Stroppa
- Date of birth: 24 January 1968 (age 58)
- Place of birth: Mulazzano, Italy
- Height: 1.78 m (5 ft 10 in)
- Position: Attacking midfielder

Youth career
- AC Milan

Senior career*
Years	Team	Apps	(Gls)
1986–1991	AC Milan	35	(2)
1987–1989	→ Monza (loan)	71	(5)
1991–1993	Lazio	50	(5)
1993–1994	Foggia	30	(8)
1994–1995	AC Milan	19	(3)
1995–1997	Udinese	45	(3)
1997–2000	Piacenza	63	(3)
2000	Brescia	17	(4)
2000–2002	Genoa	59	(5)
2002–2003	Alzano Virescit	25	(5)
2003–2004	Avellino	33	(1)
2004–2005	Foggia	9	(1)
2005	Chiari	7	(2)
Total		463	(47)

International career
1989–1990	Italy U21	7	(3)
1989	Italy B	1	(1)
1993–1994	Italy	4	(0)

Managerial career
- 2011–2012: Südtirol
- 2012: Pescara
- 2013: Spezia
- 2015–2016: Südtirol
- 2016–2018: Foggia
- 2018: Crotone
- 2018–2021: Crotone
- 2021–2022: Monza
- 2023–2024: Cremonese
- 2024–2025: Cremonese
- 2025–2026: Venezia
- * Club domestic league appearances and goals

Giovanni Stroppa (Italian pronunciation: [dʒoˈvanni ˈstrɔppa]; born 24 January 1968) is an Italian professional football manager and former player who played as an attacking midfielder. He was recently the manager of Serie A club Venezia.

== Club career ==
=== AC Milan and loan to Monza ===
Stroppa started his playing career in AC Milan's youth system, and was loaned for two seasons at Monza, a de facto Milan feeder club at the time. He returned to Milan in 1989, making his professional senior debut for the club in the Coppa Italia on 23 August, in a 0–0 away draw against Parma; Milan later reached the Coppa Italia final, only to be defeated by Juventus. He made his Serie A debut on 27 August 1989, in a 3–0 away win over Cesena, marking the occasion by scoring a long-range goal. Stroppa finished his first season with the team by winning a European Cup, a European Super Cup, and an Intercontinental Cup in 1990, under coach Arrigo Sacchi.

=== Lazio and Foggia ===
In 1991, he signed for Lazio, and in 1993 he moved to Foggia, then an outsider Serie A team known for their spectacular, offensive style of play under the coach Zdeněk Zeman.

=== Return to AC Milan ===
After an impressive season with Foggia, he returned to the Stadio San Siro to play with Milan for a single season, winning his third UEFA Super Cup with the club, as well as the Supercoppa Italiana. In total, Stroppa made 85 appearances for Milan, scoring nine goals; he made his final appearance for the club in a 1–0 away defeat to Napoli, in Serie A, on 18 May 1995.

=== Final years ===
After leaving Milan, Stroppa then played two seasons with Udinese and two seasons and a half with Piacenza before joining Brescia in the 2001 winter transfer market. After a few other experiences with Genoa in Serie B, Alzano Virescit of Serie C1 and Avellino of Serie B, he returned to Foggia, in Serie C1, in 2004.

He retired in late 2005, after a short spell with Chiari of Serie D, where he was joined by his former Brescia teammate and striker Dario Hübner.

== International career ==
Stroppa's notable performances for the club even allowed him to make his debut for the Italy national football team on 13 October 1993, in a 3–1 home win over Scotland; in total, he made four appearances for Italy between 1993 and 1994, under his former Milan manager Sacchi.

== Managerial career ==
=== AC Milan U21 ===
Stroppa was coach of Milan's under-21 team for the 2010–11 season, but was relieved of his duties on 11 June 2011, with a year still to run on his contract, and just one week after losing 1–0 to Roma in the quarter-finals of the Campionato Primavera.

=== Südtirol ===
On 13 July 2011, he was unveiled as new head coach of Südtirol.

=== Pescara ===
On 8 June 2012, he was named head coach of Serie A newcomers Pescara, replacing Zdeněk Zeman, his former boss during his first spell as a player at Foggia, who was signed by Roma a few days before his appointment. He was assisted by Andrea Guerra, Francesco Sità, Andrea Tonelli and Massimo Marini. He resigned as coach of Pescara on 18 November 2012, after a series of bad results and the team has fallen in the middle of the relegation zone. He left the club along with Guerra (vice-coach) and two assistants Sità and Tonelli.

=== Spezia ===
In June 2013, he was named new head coach of Serie B club Spezia.

=== Return to Südtirol ===
On 20 April 2015, Stroppa returned as head coach of Südtirol, ending the 2014–15 season in tenth place. The following season, Stroppa helped the side finish in tenth place once again. On 12 May 2016, Südtirol communicated that Stroppa's contract would not be renewed following its expiration on 30 June.

=== Foggia ===
On 14 August 2016, he was appointed by Foggia. He reached a promotion to Serie B with the Pugliese team.

=== Crotone ===
In June 2018, Stroppa was appointed as coach of Crotone, replacing Walter Zenga. Crotone announced the dismissal of Stroppa on 29 October 2018. He was reinstated as head coach on 28 December 2018, following the resignation of Massimo Oddo, who had previously replaced him in charge of the Calabrian club.

Since his return at Crotone, Stroppa led the Calabrian club to twelfth place in his first season, and was awarded a new contract. On his second season, he led Crotone to automatic promotion to Serie A, leading the Rossoblu back to the top flight after a two-year absence. His debut season as a Serie A manager however did not prove to be successful, as Crotone struggled to stay out of the relegation zone, leading to Stroppa being sacked on 1 March 2021.

=== Monza ===
On 28 May 2021, it was announced that Stroppa would be appointed head coach of Monza on 1 July. He returned to the club 32 years after his experience as a player. Stroppa's first win as a Monza coach came on 29 August, helping his side win 1–0 at home against Cremonese.

He guided Monza to fourth place in the regular season, missing out on automatic promotion following a 0–1 loss to Perugia in the final game, which allowed Cremonese and Pisa to overtake the Biancorossi, who were placed in second place with one game to go. In the promotion playoff tournament, Monza entered in the semifinals, where they eliminated Brescia, and then defeated Pisa in a two-legged final on a 6–4 aggregate result (after extra time), thus ensuring themselves a historical first promotion to Serie A in the 110-year club history.

Confirmed in charge of the Brianzoli for the club's debut Serie A season, Stroppa was dismissed on 13 September 2022 after achieving only one point in the first six games.

=== Cremonese ===
On 19 September 2023, Stroppa was named the new head coach of Serie B promotion hopefuls Cremonese, replacing Davide Ballardini.

Stroppa led Cremonese to the promotion playoff finals in his first season in charge, then losing to Venezia 0–1 on aggregate. After being confirmed for the 2024–25 season, Stroppa was relieved of managerial duties on 8 October 2024 due to a negative start in the new campaign. He was, however, reinstated just a month later, on 11 November, after Cremonese decided to dismiss Eugenio Corini, who had previously replaced him in charge of the Grigiorossi. He ended the season in fourth place in the regular season, and eventually led Cremonese to win the playoffs after defeating Spezia in a two-legged final, on what was his personal third promotion to Serie A in his career. Despite that, on 13 June 2025, Cremonese announced they would not confirm Stroppa in charge of the club for their comeback campaign in the top flight.

=== Venezia ===
On 26 June 2025, freshly-relegated Serie B club Venezia announced the appointment of Stroppa as their new head coach. On 1 May 2026, Stroppa led Venezia to a Serie A promotion after a 2-2 draw against La Spezia. On 14 May 2026, Stroppa confirm he will be Venezia's coach for the following Serie A season.

== Style of play ==
A quick, energetic, and talented, yet injury-prone player, Stroppa was mainly known for his technical skills, and his ability to create chances for teammates, which enabled him to play in several creative midfield and attacking roles: he was initially deployed as an attacking midfielder, or as a supporting striker, but he was also used as a winger, and even as a central midfielder on occasion; he later played as a deep-lying playmaker during the final seasons of his career.

== Career statistics ==
=== Managerial ===
As of match played 12 October 2026

Managerial record by team and tenure
Team	Nat	From	To	Record							
Team	Nat	From	To	G	W	D	L	GF	GA	GD	Win %
Südtirol	(Italy)	13 July 2011	20 May 2012	38	12	15	11	43	38	+5	31.58
Pescara	(Italy)	8 June 2012	18 November 2012	14	4	2	8	10	24	−14	28.57
Spezia	(Italy)	20 June 2013	14 December 2013	21	8	7	6	25	26	−1	38.10
Südtirol	(Italy)	20 April 2015	12 May 2016	40	12	14	14	43	51	−8	30.00
Foggia	(Italy)	14 August 2016	20 June 2018	87	45	21	21	151	107	+44	51.72
Crotone	(Italy)	20 June 2018	29 October 2018	11	5	2	4	17	13	+4	45.45
Crotone	(Italy)	28 December 2018	1 March 2021	84	32	18	34	117	121	−4	38.10
Monza	(Italy)	1 July 2021	13 September 2022	50	24	11	15	77	62	+15	48.00
Cremonese	(Italy)	19 September 2023	8 October 2024	49	23	12	14	68	47	+21	46.94
Cremonese	(Italy)	11 November 2024	13 June 2025	29	13	11	5	51	31	+20	44.83
Venezia	(Italy)	26 June 2025	13 October 2026	49	26	11	12	91	56	+35	53.06
Total				472	204	124	144	693	576	+117	43.22

== Honours ==
=== Player ===
AC Milan

- European Cup: 1989–90
- UEFA Super Cup: 1989, 1990, 1994
- Intercontinental Cup: 1989, 1990
- Supercoppa Italiana: 1994
