= Raffaele Sergio =

Italian footballer

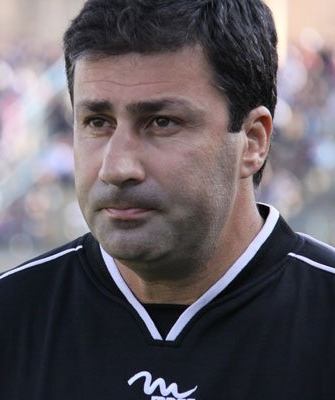

Personal information
- Date of birth: 27 August 1966 (age 60)
- Place of birth: Cava dei Tirreni
- Position: Defender

Senior career*
| Years | Team | Apps | (Gls) |
| 1984–1985 | Cavese | | |
| 1985–1987 | Benevento | | |
| 1987–1989 | Mantova | | |
| 1989–1992 | Lazio | | |
| 1992–1994 | Torino | | |
| 1994–1995 | Ancona | | |
| 1995–1997 | Udinese | | |
| 1997–1999 | Napoli | | |
| 1999–2000 | Benevento | | |
| 2000–2001 | Cavese | | |
- * Club domestic league appearances and goals

Raffaele Sergio (born 27 August 1966) is a retired Italian football defender.
