= Gabriele Pin =

Italian footballer and coach

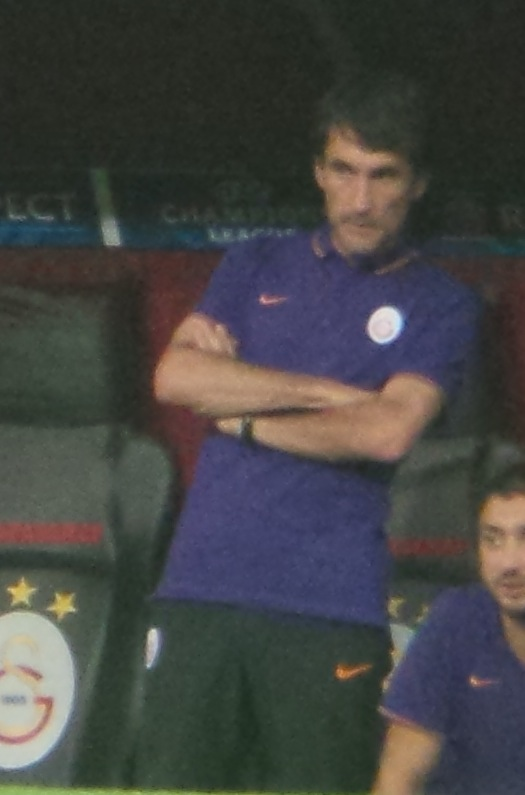
- Pin with Galatasaray S.K. at UEFA Champions League 2014-15

Personal information
- Date of birth: 21 January 1962 (age 64)
- Place of birth: Vittorio Veneto, Italy
- Height: 1.74 m (5 ft 9 in)
- Position: Midfielder

Team information
- Current team: Al-Ittihad Kalba (assistant manager)

Youth career
- 1975–1979: Juventus

Senior career*
Years	Team	Apps	(Gls)
1979–1981	Juventus	1	(0)
1981–1982	Sanremese	22	(1)
1982–1983	Forlì	22	(5)
1983–1985	Parma	67	(7)
1985–1986	Juventus	21	(1)
1986–1992	Lazio	196	(15)
1992–1996	Parma	97	(2)
1996–1997	Piacenza	21	(0)
Total		447	(31)

Managerial career
- 1999–2001: Parma (reserves)
- 2001–2004: Parma (assistant)
- 2005–2010: Fiorentina (assistant)
- 2010–2014: Italy (assistant)
- 2014: Galatasaray (assistant)
- 2016: Valencia (assistant)
- 2017–2018: Al-Nasr (assistant)
- 2018–2019: Genoa (assistant)
- 2020–2021: Fiorentina (assistant)
- 2021–2022: Esteghlal (assistant)
- 2022–2025: Al-Ittihad Kalba (assistant)
- 2025–: Sepahan (assistant)
- * Club domestic league appearances and goals

Gabriele Pin (born 21 January 1962) is an Italian football coach, and a former player. He is currently an assistant coach at Sepahan.

Pin became a coach after a long professional career as a midfielder. As a player, he won the Scudetto and Intercontinental Cup with Juventus and the UEFA Cup Winners' Cup, the UEFA Cup and the UEFA Super Cup with Parma.

As a coach he has served as assistant to Cesare Prandelli in the latter's stints as manager, earning a runners-up medal with the Italy national team at UEFA Euro 2012. On 6 September 2021, he joined Esteghlal coaching staff.
