= Claudio Sclosa =

Italian footballer (born 1961)

Personal information
- Date of birth: 28 February 1961 (age 65)
- Place of birth: Latisana, Italy
- Height: 1.80 m (5 ft 11 in)
- Position: Midfielder

Senior career*
Years	Team	Apps	(Gls)
1979–1982	Torino	47	(0)
1982–1983	Bologna	27	(2)
1983–1984	Como	33	(3)
1984–1985	Torino	25	(1)
1985–1986	Bari	29	(1)
1986–1988	Pisa	60	(8)
1988–1994	Lazio	133	(1)
1994–1995	Cremonese	11	(1)
1995–1996	Pistoiese	28	(0)
Total		393	(17)
- * Club domestic league appearances and goals

Claudio Sclosa (born 28 February 1961), is a retired Italian footballer, who played as a holding midfielder in clubs such as Torino and Lazio.

== Career ==
Coming through the youth ranks of then top club Torino, Sclosa initially had difficulties getting regular match practice at the club. He therefore spent two years at smaller clubs Bologna and Como, before returning to Torino in 1984. Despite being a regular fixture in the clubs' second-place finishing season in 1984–85, Sclosa was sold to Bari a year later.

Sclosa played one season at Bari, before moving to Pisa, where he scored almost half of his 17 professional football league goals. His strong form at Pisa impressed newcomers Lazio, who bought him to the club in the summer of 1988. Sclosa had his longest stay at a club in Lazio, playing for the club through six seasons. When the team was a midfield club, Sclosa was good enough to be a regular fixture in the starting line-up, but when the club bought stars such as Paul Gascoigne, Thomas Doll and Roberto Di Matteo, getting playtime was a tough task.

Aged 33, Sclosa left Lazio in 1994, embarking on a switch to Cremonese, where he spent an injury-plagued season, with the club almost being relegated. Sclosa then moved on to Pistoiese in Serie B, where he played a final season before hanging up his boots aged 35.

A few years after his retirement Sclosa became a licensed football agent.

== Sources ==
- Claudio Sclosa at TuttoCalciatori.net (in Italian)
