= Angelo Gregucci =

Italian footballer and coach (born 1964)

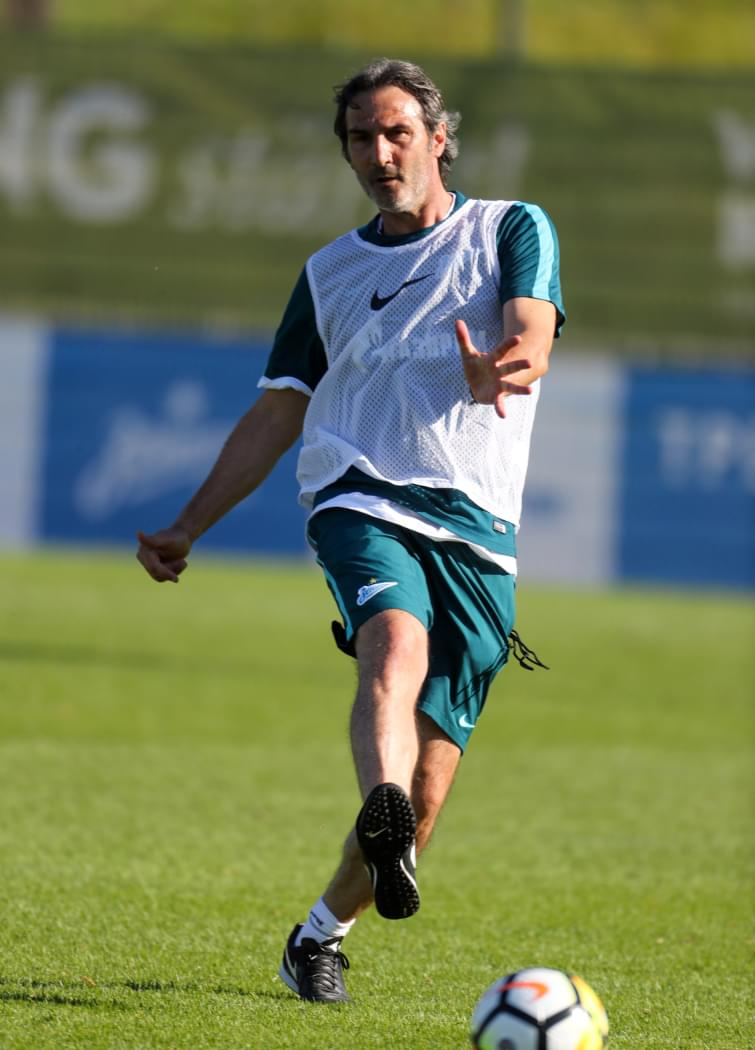
- Gregucci in 2017

Personal information
- Full name: Angelo Adamo Gregucci
- Date of birth: 10 June 1964 (age 62)
- Place of birth: San Giorgio Ionico, Italy
- Height: 1.87 m (6 ft 2 in)
- Position: Defender

Youth career
- 1976–1981: Taranto

Senior career*
Years	Team	Apps	(Gls)
1981–1982	Taranto	3	(0)
1982–1986	Alessandria	105	(8)
1986–1993	Lazio	187	(12)
1993–1994	Torino	24	(1)
1994–1998	Reggiana	64	(2)
Total		383	(23)

Managerial career
- 1999: Reggiana
- 2002: Fiorentina (caretaker)
- 2002-2003: Legnano
- 2003–2004: Venezia
- 2004–2005: Salernitana
- 2005: Lecce
- 2006–2009: Vicenza
- 2009: Atalanta
- 2010–2011: Sassuolo
- 2012: Reggina
- 2014: Salernitana
- 2014: Casertana
- 2015–2016: Alessandria
- 2018–2019: Salernitana
- 2020–2021: Alessandria
- 2025–2026: Sampdoria
- * Club domestic league appearances and goals

Angelo Adamo Gregucci (born 10 June 1964) is an Italian football manager and former player.

== Playing career ==
Born in San Giorgio Ionico, Province of Taranto, Gregucci started his playing career in 1981 with Taranto, before moving to Alessandria the following season, spending four seasons with the Piedmontese side. From 1986 to 1993, he played for Lazio, collecting a total of 187 Serie A appearances with the biancazzurri, being a mainstay for the Roman side. After a single season with Torino in 1993–94, he moved to Reggiana where he spent four seasons before retiring in 1998.

== Coaching career ==
Gregucci started his coaching career in 2000 as Roberto Mancini's assistant at Fiorentina, and then briefly served as joint coach of Serie C1 side Viterbese during the 2001–02 season. He then joined Legnano of Serie C2 as head coach for the following season, ending it in eighth place. He was then appointed by Serie B team Venezia for the following season, but he failed to keep the lagunari away from the relegation zone as they ended in 20th place. He moved to Salernitana, another Serie B team, in the next season, leading them to a 14th place in the final table.

Gregucci started his 2005–06 season as Lecce coach in the Serie A, but was sacked after only five weeks due to poor results. He was appointed as head coach of Serie B team Vicenza in October 2006, when he was appointed to replace Giancarlo Camolese. Gregucci was confirmed as the new Atalanta head coach on 5 June, but was later sacked after losing all four games into the season.

On 3 October 2010, he was announced as new head coach of Serie B promotion hopefuls Sassuolo, taking over from Daniele Arrigoni. He is the head coach of the team, He was sacked, but after two weeks he was called back.

On 8 January 2012, he was announced as new head coach of Serie B promotion hopefuls Reggina, taking over from Roberto Breda. He was removed only three months later, on 15 April, following a 1–1 home draw with Crotone, with Breda being reinstantiated at his place.

From 8 August 2012, he worked at Manchester City to fill the role of technical assistant.

On 18 July 2016, Inter Milan announced that Gregucci had been appointed assistant coach until 30 June 2017.

He rejoined Mancini in 2018 as assistant for the Italy national team, a position he held until December 2018, when, for the third time in his career, he returned to Salernitana (now in Serie B), this time as the club's head coach. On 6 May 2019, Gregucci was relieved by the club due to bad results.

On 24 January 2020, he was hired by Alessandria for a second time. After completing the 2019–20 Serie C season in fifth place and then being eliminated in the round of 16 of the promotion playoffs, he was confirmed for the new season, but was removed from his managerial duties on 21 January 2021, with the club in fourth place and eleven points behind first-placed Renate.

On 19 October 2025, Gregucci was announced as the new head coach of Sampdoria, with Salvatore Foti as assistant and Nicola Pozzi as technical collaborator. On 9 March 2026, following a 0–3 loss to Frosinone, Gregucci and his assistant Foti were both dismissed from their respective roles with immediate effect.

== Honours ==
=== Player ===
Torino

- Supercoppa Italiana runner-up: 1993

=== Coach ===
Salernitana

- Coppa Italia Lega Pro: 2013–14
