= Rubén Sosa =

Uruguayan footballer (born 1966)

Ruben Sosa
Personal information
- Full name: Ruben Sosa Ardaiz
- Date of birth: 25 April 1966 (age 60)
- Place of birth: Montevideo, Uruguay
- Height: 1.75 m (5 ft 9 in)
- Position: Forward

Senior career*
| Years | Team | Apps | (Gls) |
| 1982–1985 | Danubio | 72 | (27) |
| 1985–1988 | Zaragoza | 106 | (33) |
| 1988–1992 | Lazio | 124 | (40) |
| 1992–1995 | Inter Milan | 76 | (44) |
| 1995–1996 | Borussia Dortmund | 17 | (3) |
| 1996–1997 | Logroñés | 5 | (0) |
| 1997–2001 | Nacional | 105 | (33) |
| 2002 | Shanghai Shenhua | 13 | (1) |
| 2003–2004 | Nacional | 15 | (1) |
| 2006 | Racing MVD | 2 | (0) |
| Total | | 535 | (182) |

International career
| 1984–1995 | Uruguay | 46 | (15) |
Medal record
Men's football
Representing Uruguay
Copa América
| Winner | 1987 Argentina |
| Winner | 1995 Uruguay |
| Runner-up | 1989 Brazil |
- * Club domestic league appearances and goals

Ruben Sosa Ardaiz (born 25 April 1966) is a Uruguayan former professional football forward.

He began his professional career with Danubio in Uruguay in 1982. He then joined Zaragoza in Spain, spending three seasons there and winning the Copa del Rey. He then spent the next seven seasons in Italy, playing for Lazio and Inter Milan, winning the UEFA Cup with Inter, and scoring 84 Serie A goals in 200 matches. This was followed by short spells with Borussia Dortmund in Germany, where he won the Bundesliga, and Logroñés in Spain, before returning to Uruguay with Nacional, where he won the league twice. He then had a short spell in China and another spell with Nacional.

He made his debut for the Uruguay national team in 1984, playing 45 matches and scoring 16 goals in 11 years with his country. He represented Uruguay at four Copa Américas, winning the 1987 and 1995 tournaments, and being awarded best player at the 1989 tournament. He also represented Uruguay at the 1990 World Cup.

== Club career ==
Born in Montevideo, Sosa started his career in Danubio at the age of 15, being one of the youngest footballers to play in the Uruguayan First Division. He played for Danubio from 1982 to 1985, when he was transferred to Spain's Real Zaragoza. With this club, Ruben Sosa won the Copa del Rey in 1986, scoring in the final against FC Barcelona.

After playing for Zaragoza, Ruben Sosa was transferred to Italy's S.S. Lazio, staying for four years before being sold to Internazionale, where he displayed his greatest form as a football player. He was Inter's leading goal scorer in the 1992–93 and 1993–94 seasons, winning the UEFA Cup in 1994. However, the arrival of Dennis Bergkamp in the summer of 1993 led to splits within the Inter camp, and as a result Sosa left Serie A in the summer of 1995.

After years of success in Uruguay, Spain and Italy, Ruben Sosa played for Germany's Borussia Dortmund, winning the Bundesliga title in 1995–96.

When he left Borussia Dortmund, he returned to Spain to play for CD Logroñés. After a couple of months playing for the team, Ruben Sosa decided to leave in order to make his dream come true: he wanted to play for his favourite team in Uruguay, the famous Nacional. At Nacional, Sosa won the Uruguayan League in 1998, 2000 and 2001, becoming one of the fans' heroes.

In 2002, he left Nacional to play in China's Shanghai Shenhua. In 2003, Shanghai won the Chinese Jia-A League title, but the club was stripped of the title in 2013 for match fixing.

In 2004, he returned to Nacional, this time as assistant coach, winning the 2005 league title.

== International career ==
With the Uruguay national team, Sosa won the Copa América in 1987 and 1995, and he played in the 1990 FIFA World Cup in Italy; he also managed a runners-up medal at the 1989 Copa América, where he was named the tournament's best player, and later took part in the 1993 Copa América.

== Style of play ==
Nicknamed El Principito (The Little Prince) by Uruguayan fans, Sosa was a quick, creative, talented, agile, and powerful left-footed forward, with good skills, control, and explosive acceleration. A diminutive footballer with a stocky physique, he was usually deployed as a second striker, although he was also capable of playing as a main striker or even as a winger, as he was capable of both scoring and creating goals. He was known in particular for his free kicks. A complete forward, who could shoot, volley, dribble, pass with precision, and hold up the ball to create chances for teammates, his attributes made him one of the best forwards in Europe during his career. He is considered to be one of the best Uruguayan forwards of the last thirty years, alongside Luis Suárez, Edinson Cavani, Diego Forlán, Enzo Francescoli, Carlos Aguilera, Álvaro Recoba, Daniel Fonseca and Rubén Paz.

== Post-retirement ==
Nowadays, Ruben Sosa works for Nacional as assistant coach, but he also played for a Second Division team in Uruguay, Racing Club de Montevideo in 2006.

== Career statistics ==
Appearances and goals by national team and year
| National team | Year | Apps | Goals |
|---|---|---|---|
| Uruguay | 1984 | 6 | 0 |
| Uruguay | 1987 | 4 | 0 |
| Uruguay | 1988 | 1 | 1 |
| Uruguay | 1989 | 13 | 9 |
| Uruguay | 1990 | 7 | 0 |
| Uruguay | 1993 | 9 | 4 |
| Uruguay | 1995 | 6 | 1 |
| Total | | 46 | 15 |

Scores and results list Uruguay's goal tally first, score column indicates score after each Sosa goal.

List of international goals scored by Rubén Sosa
| No. | Date | Venue | Opponent | Score | Result | Competition | Ref. |
|---|---|---|---|---|---|---|---|
| 1 | 14 December 1988 | Estadio Centenario, Montevideo, Uruguay | Peru | 3–0 | 3–0 | Friendly | |
| 2 | 4 July 1989 | Estádio Serra Dourada, Goiânia, Brazil | Bolivia | 2–0 | 3–0 | 1989 Copa América | |
| 3 | 6 July 1989 | Estádio Serra Dourada, Goiânia, Brazil | Chile | 1–0 | 3–0 | 1989 Copa América | |
| 4 | 14 July 1989 | Maracanã Stadium, Rio de Janeiro, Brazil | Argentina | 1–0 | 2–0 | 1989 Copa América | |
| 5 | 14 July 1989 | Maracanã Stadium, Rio de Janeiro, Brazil | Argentina | 2–0 | 2–0 | 1989 Copa América | |
| 6 | 27 August 1989 | National Stadium of Peru, Lima, Peru | Peru | 1–0 | 2–0 | 1990 FIFA World Cup qualification | |
| 7 | 3 September 1989 | Estadio Hernando Siles, La Paz, Bolivia | Bolivia | 1–2 | 1–2 | 1990 FIFA World Cup qualification | |
| 8 | 17 September 1989 | Estadio Centenario, Montevideo, Uruguay | Bolivia | 1–0 | 2–0 | 1990 FIFA World Cup qualification | |
| 9 | 24 September 1989 | Estadio Centenario, Montevideo, Uruguay | Peru | 1–0 | 2–0 | 1990 FIFA World Cup qualification | |
| 10 | 24 September 1989 | Estadio Centenario, Montevideo, Uruguay | Peru | 2–0 | 2–0 | 1990 FIFA World Cup qualification | |
| 11 | 13 July 1993 | National Stadium of Peru, Lima, Peru | Peru | 1–0 | 2–1 | Friendly | |
| 12 | 13 July 1993 | National Stadium of Peru, Lima, Peru | Peru | 2–0 | 2–1 | Friendly | |
| 13 | 29 August 1993 | Estadio Centenario, Montevideo, Uruguay | Venezuela | 4–0 | 4–0 | 1994 FIFA World Cup qualification | |
| 14 | 5 September 1993 | Estadio Monumental Isidro Romero Carbo, Guayaquil, Ecuador | Ecuador | 1–0 | 1–0 | 1994 FIFA World Cup qualification | |
| 15 | 25 June 1995 | Estadio Parque Artigas, Paysandú, Uruguay | New Zealand | 3–0 | 7–0 | Friendly | |

== Honours ==
Danubio

- Liguilla Pre-Libertadores de América: 1983

Real Zaragoza

- Copa del Rey: 1985–86

Inter

- UEFA Cup: 1993–94

Borussia Dortmund

- Bundesliga: 1995–96

Nacional

- Uruguayan Primera División: 1998, 2000, 2001

Uruguay

- Copa América: 1987, 1995

Individual

- CONMEBOL Copa América Most Valuable Player of the Tournament: 1989
- Pirata d'Oro (Internazionale Player Of The Year): 1993
- Uruguayan Primera División Top scorer: 1998
- Copa Libertadores Top scorer: 1999
