= Valerio Fiori =

Italian footballer and coach

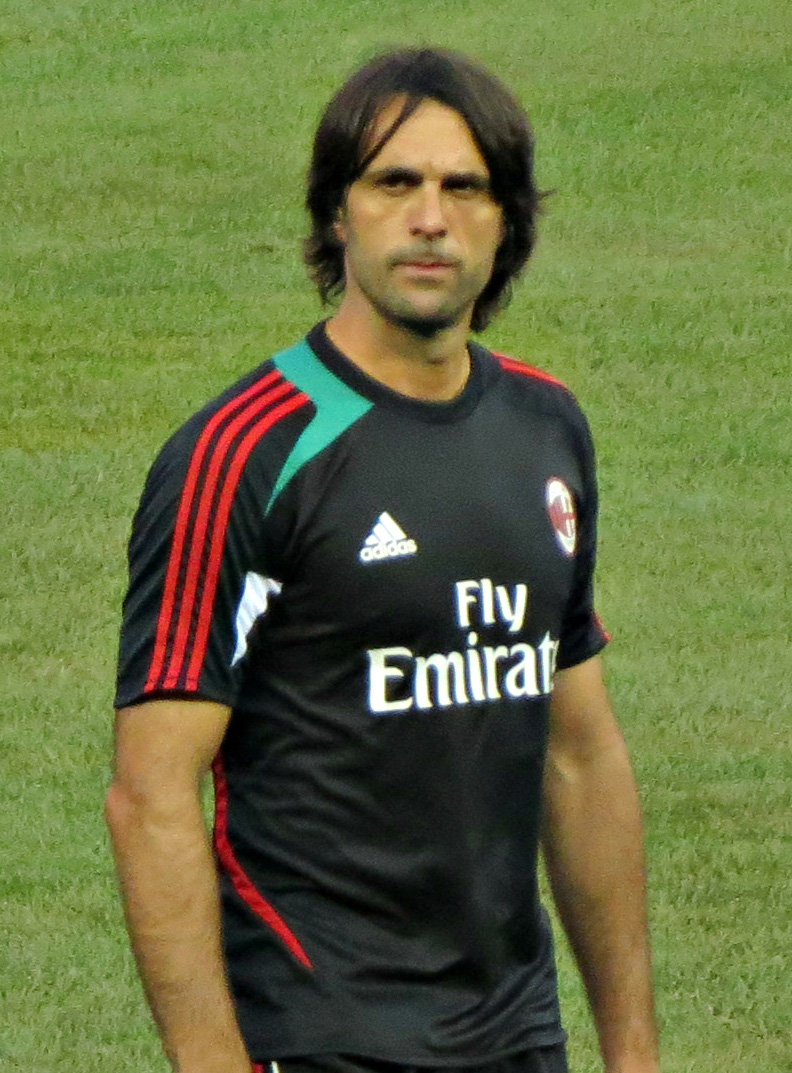
- Fiori with Milan in 2012

Personal information
- Date of birth: 27 April 1969 (age 57)
- Place of birth: Rome, Italy
- Height: 1.82 m (6 ft 0 in)
- Position: Goalkeeper

Team information
- Current team: Genoa (goalkeeping coach)

Senior career*
Years	Team	Apps	(Gls)
1985–1986	Lodigiani	1	(0)
1986–1993	Lazio	117	(0)
1993–1996	Cagliari	82	(0)
1996–1997	Cesena	18	(0)
1997–1998	Fiorentina	1	(0)
1998–1999	Piacenza	28	(0)
1999–2008	Milan	1	(0)
Total		248	(0)

International career
1989–1990	Italy U-21	4	(0)

Managerial career
- 2008–2014: Milan (goalkeeping coach)
- 2014–2016: Milan (youth) (goalkeeping coach)
- 2016: Shenzhen (goalkeeping coach)
- 2018–2019: Milan (goalkeeping coach)
- 2020–2021: Napoli (goalkeeping coach)
- 2021–: Genoa (goalkeeping coach)
- * Club domestic league appearances and goals

Valerio Fiori (born 27 April 1969) is an Italian former professional footballer who played as a goalkeeper and current goalkeeping coach. He is currently a goalkeeping coach for Serie A club Genoa.

== Career ==
Before being the third goalkeeper at A.C. Milan, he played for Lodigiani (one season), Lazio (six seasons), Cagliari (three seasons), Cesena, Fiorentina and Piacenza (1 season each). Though he made four appearances for Italy's Under-21 squad, Fiori was never called up for the senior side.

He has made only two official appearances in eight seasons with the club: a 4–2 loss in Serie A to Piacenza on 24 May 2003, and a 1–0 Coppa Italia win over Sampdoria as a first-half injury replacement for Christian Abbiati on 18 December 2003.

After his retirement in 2008, Fiori became a goalkeeping coach at A.C. Milan until 2016. After a brief interlude with the Chinese side Shenzhen, and then Spanish side Deportivo La Coruña, a club coached by former teammate Clarence Seedorf, Milan announced the return of Fiori as goalkeeper coach on 5 July 2018. In August 2020, he was appointed as Napoli goalkeeper coach.

== Personal life ==
Fiori graduated with a bachelor's degree in law from University of Rome La Sapienza on 12 July 2007.
