= 1997–98 AC Fiorentina season =

ACF Fiorentina
1997–98 season
- President: Vittorio Cecchi Gori
- Manager: Alberto Malesani
- Stadium: Stadio Artemio Franchi
- Serie A: 5th
- Coppa Italia: Quarter-finals
- Top goalscorer: League: Gabriel Batistuta (21); All: Gabriel Batistuta (24)
Home colours	Away colours	Third colours

Associazione Calcio Fiorentina came off second best in a competitive battle for fourth in Serie A. Under Alberto Malesani's leadership, Fiorentina played an attacking 3–5–2 formation, where goal scoring duo Gabriel Batistuta and Luís Oliveira scored an accumulated 36 goals between them. Following the end of the season, Malesani accepted an offer from Parma, thus departing the club after only one season in charge. Sensationally, Giovanni Trapattoni became his successor, remarking that Fiorentina was serious about winning the league.

== Players ==
Note: Flags indicate national team as defined under FIFA eligibility rules; some limited exceptions apply. Players may hold more than one non-FIFA nationality.

No.	Pos.	Nation	Player
1	GK	ITA	Francesco Toldo
2	DF	ITA	Giulio Falcone
3	DF	ITA	Michele Serena
4	MF	ITA	Giovanni Piacentini
5	DF	ITA	Pasquale Padalino
6	DF	ITA	Aldo Firicano
7	MF	SWE	Stefan Schwarz
8	MF	ITA	Emiliano Bigica
9	FW	ARG	Gabriel Batistuta
10	MF	POR	Rui Costa
11	DF	ITA	Stefano Bettarini
14	MF	ITA	Sandro Cois
15	DF	ITA	Roberto Mirri
16	DF	ITA	Simone Bartaloni

No.	Pos.	Nation	Player
17	MF	RUS	Andrei Kanchelskis
18	FW	ITA	Francesco Flachi
19	FW	ITA	Davide Dionigi
20	MF	ITA	Domenico Morfeo
21	MF	ITA	Mirko Benin
22	GK	ITA	Valerio Fiori
23	FW	ITA	Anselmo Robbiati
24	MF	ITA	Christian Amoroso
25	FW	BRA	Luís Oliveira
27	DF	ITA	Andrea Tarozzi
28	FW	ITA	Alessandro Atzeni
29	FW	BRA	Edmundo
32	MF	ITA	Carlo Carta
26	MF	ITA	Danilo Stefani
34	FW	ITA	Francesco Tavano

=== Transfers ===
In
Pos.	Name	from	Type
MF	Domenico Morfeo	Atalanta B.C.	€7.70 million
MF	Christian Amoroso	Empoli F.C.	loan ended
GK	Valerio Fiori	A.C. Cesena	
FW	Francesco Flachi	A.S. Bari	loan ended
DF	Stefano Bettarini	Cagliari Calcio	
FW	Davide Dionigi	Reggina Calcio	
FW	Francesco Tavano	Nola	

Out
Pos.	Name	To	Type
DF	Lorenzo Amoruso	Glasgow Rangers	€6.00 million
FW	Francesco Baiano	Derby County	
MF	Massimo Orlando	Atalanta B.C.	
DF	Vittorio Pusceddu	Empoli F.C.	
DF	Daniele Carnasciali	Bologna F.C.	
GK	Gianmatteo Mareggini	A.C. Siena	

==== Winter ====
In
Pos.	Name	from	Type
FW	Edmundo	CR Vasco da Gama	

Out
Pos.	Name	To	Type
DF	Vittorio Pusceddu	Torino	
FW	Francesco Flachi	Ancona	loan
FW	Davide Dionigi	Piacenza Calcio	

== Competitions ==
=== Serie A ===
==== League table ====
Pos	Team	Pld	W	D	L	GF	GA	GD	Pts	Qualification or relegation
3	Udinese	34	19	7	8	62	40	+22	64	Qualification to UEFA Cup
4	Roma	34	16	11	7	67	42	+25	59	Qualification to UEFA Cup
5	Fiorentina	34	15	12	7	65	36	+29	57 (Note: Fiorentina finished ahead of Parma on head-to-head points: FIO 1–1 PAR; PAR 1–2 FIO.)	Qualification to UEFA Cup
6	Parma	34	15	12	7	55	39	+16	57	Qualification to UEFA Cup
7	Lazio	34	16	8	10	53	30	+23	56	Qualification to Cup Winners' Cup

Source: 1997–98 Serie A, RSSSF.com, Soccerway
Rules for classification: 1) Points; 2) Head-to-head points; 3) Head-to-head goal difference; 4) Goal difference; 5) Goals scored; 6) Draw. (Note: Head-to-head record is used only after all the matches between the teams in question have been played).

==== Results summary ====
Overall								Home						Away					
Pld	W	D	L	GF	GA	GD	Pts	W	D	L	GF	GA	GD	W	D	L	GF	GA	GD
34	15	12	7	65	36	+29	57	8	7	2	36	13	+23	7	5	5	29	23	+6

Last updated: 24 July 2015.
Source: Competitive matches

==== Results by round ====
Round	1	2	3	4	5	6	7	8	9	10	11	12	13	14	15	16	17	18	19	20	21	22	23	24	25	26	27	28	29	30	31	32	33	34
Ground	A	H	A	H	A	H	A	H	A	A	H	A	H	H	A	H	A	H	A	H	A	H	A	H	A	H	H	A	H	A	A	H	A	H
Result	W	W	L	L	L	D	D	W	D	D	D	W	W	D	W	L	W	W	W	D	D	W	L	D	D	D	W	W	D	L	L	W	W	W
Position	1	1	6	9	11	11	11	8	9	9	10	9	7	8	6	8	6	6	5	5	5	5	7	7	7	7	7	6	7	7	7	7	7	5

Source: Competitive matches
A = Away; H = Home; W = Win; D = Draw; L = Loss; P = Postponed; = Leader, 1998–99 UEFA Champions League Group stage; = 1998–99 UEFA Champions League Second Qualifying round; = 1998–99 UEFA Cup First round; = Qualification to Intertoto Cup; = 1998–99 Serie B

==== Matches ====
31 August 1997 1	Udinese	2–3	Fiorentina	Udine
	Amoroso 29'; Poggi 73'	Report	Batistuta 59', 89', 90+3'	Stadium: Stadio Friuli; Referee: Domenico Messina

14 September 1997 2	Fiorentina	3–1	Bari	Florence
	Batistuta 1', 11'; Kanchelskis 39'	Report	Ventola 2'	Stadium: Stadio Artemio Franchi; Referee: Pierpaolo Rossi

21 September 1997 3	Internazionale	3–2	Fiorentina	Milan
	Ronaldo 45'; Moriero 72'; Djorkaeff 81'	Report	Serena 45+1'; Batistuta 47'	Stadium: San Siro; Referee: Graziano Cesari

28 September 1997 4	Fiorentina	1–2	Empoli	Florence
	Batistuta 24'	Report	Tonetto 60'; Martusciello 90+4'	Stadium: Stadio Artemio Franchi; Referee: Pasquale Rodomonti

5 October 1997 5	Juventus	2–1	Fiorentina	Turin
	Inzaghi 33'; Del Piero 36'	Report	Pessotto 24' (o.g.)	Stadium: Stadio delle Alpi; Referee: Livio Bazzoli

19 October 1997 6	Fiorentina	0–0	Roma	Florence
		Report		Stadium: Stadio Artemio Franchi; Referee: Robert Anthony Boggi

2 November 1997 7	Piacenza	0–0	Fiorentina	Piacenza
		Report		Stadium: Stadio Leonardo Garilli; Referee: Massimo De Santis

9 November 1997 8	Fiorentina	5–0	Lecce	Florence
	Batistuta 18', 90+2'; Oliveira 45', 63'; Rossi 51' (o.g.)	Report		Stadium: Stadio Artemio Franchi; Referee: Lorenzo Branzoni

23 November 1997 9	Bologna	2–2	Fiorentina	Bologna
	Andersson 35'; Paramatti 73'	Report	Oliveira 30'; Batistuta 83'	Stadium: Stadio Renato Dall'Ara; Referee: Emilio Pellegrino

30 November 1997 10	Napoli	1–1	Fiorentina	Naples
	Turrini 34'	Report	Firicano 28'	Stadium: Stadio San Paolo; Referee: Fiorenzo Treossi

7 December 1997 11	Fiorentina	1–1	Parma	Florence
	Morfeo 58'	Report	Apolloni 54'	Stadium: Stadio Artemio Franchi; Referee: Pierluigi Pairetto

14 December 1997 12	Vicenza	1–5	Fiorentina	Vicenza
	Di Napoli 81'	Report	Oliveira 7', 54'; Batistuta 43'; Serena 59'; Schwarz 65'	Stadium: Stadio Romeo Menti; Referee: Gennaro Borriello

21 December 1997 13	Fiorentina	5–0	Atalanta	Florence
	Padalino 27'; Serena 48'; Oliveira 77'; Batistuta 83'; Robbiati 90+1'	Report		Stadium: Stadio Artemio Franchi; Referee: Alfredo Trentalange

4 January 1998 14	Fiorentina	1–1	Sampdoria	Florence
	Batistuta 7'	Report	Montella 78'	Stadium: Stadio Artemio Franchi; Referee: Domenico Messina

11 January 1998 15	Brescia	1–3	Fiorentina	Brescia
	Hübner 53' (pen.)	Report	Morfeo 48'; Batistuta 61'; Rui Costa 81'	Stadium: Stadio Mario Rigamonti; Referee: Livio Bazzoli

18 January 1998 16	Fiorentina	1–3	Lazio	Florence
	Cois 29'	Report	Bokšić 31'; Rambaudi 78'; Nedvěd 84'	Stadium: Stadio Artemio Franchi; Referee: Graziano Cesari

25 January 1998 17	Milan	0–2	Fiorentina	Milan
		Report	Oliveira 3'; Morfeo 52'	Stadium: San Siro; Referee: Gennaro Borriello

1 February 1998 18	Fiorentina	1–0	Udinese	Florence
	Oliveira 75'	Report		Stadium: Stadio Artemio Franchi; Referee: Fiorenzo Treossi

8 February 1998 19	Bari	0–1	Fiorentina	Bari
		Report	Morfeo 71'	Stadium: Stadio San Nicola; Referee: Cosimo Bolognino

11 February 1998 20	Fiorentina	1–1	Internazionale	Florence
	Batistuta 42'	Report	Ronaldo 26'	Stadium: Stadio Artemio Franchi; Referee: Robert Anthony Boggi

15 February 1998 21	Empoli	1–1	Fiorentina	Empoli
	Esposito 74'	Report	Oliveira 52'	Stadium: Stadio Carlo Castellani; Referee: Massimo De Santis

22 February 1998 22	Fiorentina	3–0	Juventus	Florence
	Firicano 31'; Oliveira 34'; Robbiati 79'	Report		Stadium: Stadio Artemio Franchi; Referee: Piero Ceccarini

1 March 1998 23	Roma	4–1	Fiorentina	Rome
	Paulo Sérgio 12'; Delvecchio 32', 41'; Totti 56'	Report	Batistuta 71'	Stadium: Stadio Olimpico; Referee: Fiorenzo Treossi

8 March 1998 24	Fiorentina	1–1	Piacenza	Florence
	Morfeo 71' (pen.)	Report	Dionigi 28' (pen.)	Stadium: Stadio Artemio Franchi; Referee: Salvatore Racalbuto

15 March 1998 25	Lecce	1–1	Fiorentina	Lecce
	Rossi 69'	Report	Oliveira 87'	Stadium: Stadio Via del Mare; Referee: Pierpaolo Rossi

22 March 1998 26	Fiorentina	1–1	Bologna	Florence
	Oliveira 36' (pen.)	Report	R. Baggio 40' (pen.)	Stadium: Stadio Artemio Franchi; Referee: Pasquale Rodomonti

29 March 1998 27	Fiorentina	4–0	Napoli	Florence
	Batistuta 40', 67'; Robbiati 80'; Edmundo 86'	Report		Stadium: Stadio Artemio Franchi; Referee: Stefano Farina

5 April 1998 28	Parma	1–2	Fiorentina	Parma
	Crespo 58'	Report	Edmundo 54'; Rui Costa 77'	Stadium: Stadio Ennio Tardini; Referee: Cosimo Bolognino

11 April 1998 29	Fiorentina	1–1	Vicenza	Florence
	Oliveira 33'	Report	Méndez 11'	Stadium: Stadio Artemio Franchi; Referee: Livio Bazzoli

19 April 1998 30	Atalanta	1–0	Fiorentina	Bergamo
	Boselli 59'	Report		Stadium: Stadio Atleti Azzurri d'Italia; Referee: Pierluigi Pairetto

26 April 1998 31	Sampdoria	2–0	Fiorentina	Genoa
	Montella 38', 77'	Report		Stadium: Stadio Luigi Ferraris; Referee: Roberto Bettin

3 May 1998 32	Fiorentina	5–1	Brescia	Florence
	Batistuta 1', 40'; Oliveira 35'; Edmundo 38'; Schwarz 48'	Report	Hübner 53'	Stadium: Stadio Artemio Franchi; Referee: Tarcisio Serena

10 May 1998 33	Lazio	1–4	Fiorentina	Rome
	Serena 42' (o.g.)	Report	Oliveira 13'; Edmundo 24'; Batistuta 41'; Rui Costa 84'	Stadium: Stadio Olimpico; Referee: Stefano Farina

16 May 1998 34	Fiorentina	2–0	Milan	Florence
	Rui Costa 50'; Kanchelskis 55'	Report		Stadium: Stadio Artemio Franchi; Referee: Massimo De Santis

=== Coppa Italia ===
==== Quarter-finals ====
7 January 1998 First leg	Fiorentina	2–2	Juventus	Florence
	Rui Costa 5'; Montero 42' (o.g.)		Inzaghi 64'; Zidane 73'	Stadium: Stadio Artemio Franchi; Referee: Fiorenzo Treossi

20 January 1998 Second leg	Juventus	0–0 (2–2 agg.)	Fiorentina	Turin
				Stadium: Stadio delle Alpi; Referee: Pasquale Rodomonti

== Statistics ==
=== Appearances and goals ===
No.	Pos	Nat	Player	Total		Serie A		Coppa	
No.	Pos	Nat	Player	Apps	Goals	Apps	Goals	Apps	Goals
1	GK	(Italy) ITA	Toldo	37	-40	34	-36	3	-4
2	DF	(Italy) ITA	Falcone	30	0	25+1	0	4	0
5	DF	(Italy) ITA	Padalino	30	1	28	1	2	0
6	DF	(Italy) ITA	Firicano	37	2	31	2	6	0
3	DF	(Italy) ITA	Serena	35	3	31	3	4	0
7	MF	(Sweden) SWE	Schwarz	26	2	22	2	4	0
14	MF	(Italy) ITA	Cois	31	1	28	1	3	0
20	MF	(Italy) ITA	Morfeo	29	6	19+5	5	5	1
10	MF	(Portugal) POR	Rui Costa	37	5	32	3	5	2
9	FW	(Argentina) ARG	Batistuta	36	24	31	21	5	3
25	FW	(Brazil) BRA	Oliveira	36	15	33	15	3	0
22	GK	(Italy) ITA	Fiori	4	-1	0+1	0	3	-1
27	DF	(Italy) ITA	Tarozzi	33	0	18+10	0	5	0
17	MF	(Russia) RUS	Kanchelskis	19	2	14+3	2	2	0
23	FW	(Italy) ITA	Robbiati	28	4	7+18	4	3	0
11	DF	(Italy) ITA	Bettarini	22	0	7+9	0	6	0
29	FW	(Brazil) BRA	Edmundo	10	4	7+2	4	1	0
24	MF	(Italy) ITA	Amoroso	17	0	3+12	0	2	0
8	MF	(Italy) ITA	Bigica	12	0	2+7	0	3	0
4	MF	(Italy) ITA	Piacentini	11	0	1+6	0	4	0
15	DF	(Italy) ITA	Mirri	9	0	1+4	0	4	0
18	FW	(Italy) ITA	Flachi	7	1	0+3	0	4	1
19	FW	(Italy) ITA	Dionigi	4	1	0+2	0	2	1
28	FW	(Italy) ITA	Atzeni	2	0	0+2	0		
32	MF	(Italy) ITA	Carta	1	0	0+1	0		
21	MF	(Italy) ITA	Benin	0	0	0	0		
26	MF	(Italy) ITA	Stefani	0	0	0	0		
34	FW	(Italy) ITA	Tavano	0	0	0	0		
30	DF	(Italy) ITA	Agostini	0	0	0	0		
33	MF	(Italy) ITA	Musso	0	0	0	0		
31	FW	(Italy) ITA	Spigoli	0	0	0	0		
16	DF	(Italy) ITA	Bartoloni						

- Source: http://calcio-seriea.net/rose/1997/1141/

=== Goalscorers ===
- (Argentina) Gabriel Batistuta 21
- (Belgium) Luís Oliveira 14 (1)
- (Italy) Domenico Morfeo 5 (1)
- (Brazil) Edmundo 4
- (Italy) Anselmo Robbiati 4
- (Portugal) Rui Costa 4
