= 1996–97 AC Fiorentina season =

Fiorentina
1996–97 season
- President: Vittorio Cecchi Gori
- Manager: Claudio Ranieri
- Stadium: Stadio Artemio Franchi
- Serie A: 9th
- Supercoppa Italiana: Winners
- Coppa Italia: Round of 16
- UEFA Cup Winners' Cup: Semi-finals
- Top goalscorer: League: Gabriel Batistuta (13); All: Gabriel Batistuta (19)
Home colours	Away colours	Third colours

Associazione Calcio Fiorentina did not manage to repeat its spectacular 1995–96 season, and did not win any trophies the following year. A relatively meagre goalscoring season from superstar Gabriel Batistuta was one of the reasons for the declining performance, for which head coach Claudio Ranieri was sacked at the end of the season. The highlight of Fiorentina's season was reaching the semi-finals of the Cup Winners' Cup, where it lost to Barcelona 2–0 at the Camp Nou, following a 1–1 draw in Florence.

== Players ==
Note: Flags indicate national team as defined under FIFA eligibility rules; some limited exceptions apply. Players may hold more than one non-FIFA nationality.

No.	Pos.	Nation	Player
—	GK	ITA	Francesco Toldo
—	GK	ITA	Alessandro Zandonà
—	GK	ITA	Gianmatteo Mareggini
—	GK	ITA	Mattia Passarini
—	DF	ITA	Daniele Carnasciali
—	DF	ITA	Michele Serena
—	DF	ITA	Lorenzo Amoruso
—	DF	ITA	Aldo Firicano
—	DF	ITA	Giulio Falcone
—	DF	ITA	Vittorio Pusceddu
—	DF	ITA	Pasquale Padalino
—	DF	ITA	Daniele Chiarini
—	MF	ITA	Giovanni Piacentini
—	MF	SWE	Stefan Schwarz

No.	Pos.	Nation	Player
—	MF	POR	Rui Costa
—	MF	ITA	Danilo Stefani
—	MF	ITA	Sandro Cois
—	MF	ITA	Roberto Mirri
—	MF	ITA	Massimo Orlando
—	MF	ITA	Emiliano Bigica
—	MF	RUS	Andrei Kanchelskis
—	MF	ITA	Mirko Benin
—	FW	ITA	Francesco Baiano
—	FW	ARG	Gabriel Batistuta
—	FW	BEL	Luís Oliveira
—	FW	ITA	Marco Vendrame
—	FW	ITA	Anselmo Robbiati
—	FW	ITA	Andrea Mussi

=== Transfers ===
In
Pos.	Name	from	Type
FW	Luis Oliveira	Cagliari Calcio	
DF	Aldo Firicano	Cagliari Calcio	
DF	Vittorio Pusceddu	Cagliari Calcio	
DF	Giulio Falcone	Torino	
MF	Danilo Stefani	Maceratese	

Out
Pos.	Name	To	Type
FW	Giacomo Banchelli	Cagliari Calcio	
DF	Andrea Sottil	Atalanta B.C.	
DF	Alberto Malusci	Olympique Marseille	
DF	Alessandro Orlando	Udinese Calcio	
MF	Christian Amoroso	Empoli F.C.	loan
MF	Cristiano Zanetti	Venezia F.C.	

==== Winter ====
In
Pos.	Name	from	Type
MF	Andrei Kanchelskis	Everton F.C.	

Out
Pos.	Name	To	Type
FW	Francesco Flachi	A.S. Bari	

== Competitions ==
=== Supercoppa Italiana ===
25 August 1996	Milan	1–2	Fiorentina	Milan
20:30 CEST (UTC+02:00)	Savićević 22'		Batistuta 12', 38'	Stadium: San Siro; Attendance: 29,582; Referee: Fiorenzo Treossi

=== Serie A ===
==== League table ====
Pos	Team	Pld	W	D	L	GF	GA	GD	Pts	Qualification or relegation
7	Bologna	34	13	10	11	50	44	+6	49	
8	Vicenza	34	12	11	11	43	38	+5	47	Qualification to Cup Winners' Cup
9	Fiorentina	34	10	15	9	46	41	+5	45	
10	Atalanta	34	11	11	12	44	46	−2	44	
11	Milan	34	11	10	13	43	45	−2	43	

Source: Serie A, RSSSF.com, Soccerway
Rules for classification: 1) Points; 2) Head-to-head points; 3) Head-to-head goal difference; 4) Goal difference; 5) Goals scored; 6) Draw. (Note: Head-to-head record is used only after all the matches between the teams in question have been played).

==== Results summary ====
Overall								Home						Away					
Pld	W	D	L	GF	GA	GD	Pts	W	D	L	GF	GA	GD	W	D	L	GF	GA	GD
34	10	15	9	46	41	+5	45	9	6	2	28	14	+14	1	9	7	18	27	−9

Last updated: 25 July 2015.
Source: Competitive matches

==== Position by round ====
Round	1	2	3	4	5	6	7	8	9	10	11	12	13	14	15	16	17	18	19	20	21	22	23	24	25	26	27	28	29	30	31	32	33	34
Ground	H	A	H	A	H	A	H	A	A	H	A	H	A	H	H	A	H	A	H	A	H	A	H	A	H	H	A	H	A	H	A	A	H	A
Result	L	D	W	L	D	W	W	D	D	D	D	W	L	W	W	D	D	L	D	L	D	L	W	L	W	D	D	W	D	L	L	D	W	D
Position	11	13	10	12	12	11	6	7	9	10	9	6	10	7	5	5	6	9	9	11	10	12	9	11	10	9	8	8	9	10	10	10	9	9

Source: Competitive matches
A = Away; H = Home; W = Win; D = Draw; L = Loss; P = Postponed; = Leader, 1997–98 UEFA Champions League Group stage; = 1997–98 UEFA Champions League Second Qualifying round; = 1997–98 UEFA Cup First round; = 1997–98 Serie B

==== Matches ====
8 September 1996 1	Fiorentina	2–4	Vicenza	Florence
	Sartor 36' (o.g.); Oliveira 80'	Report	Otero 8', 29', 67', 90' (pen.)	Stadium: Stadio Artemio Franchi; Referee: Daniele Tombolini

15 September 1996 2	Atalanta	2–2	Fiorentina	Bergamo
	Inzaghi 56' (pen.), 62'	Report	Oliveira 15'; Batistuta 81'	Stadium: Stadio Atleti Azzurri d'Italia; Referee: Robert Anthony Boggi

22 September 1996 3	Fiorentina	2–0	Hellas Verona	Florence
	Robbiati 6'; Batistuta 49' (pen.)	Report		Stadium: Stadio Artemio Franchi; Referee: Salvatore Racalbuto

29 September 1996 4	Juventus	1–0	Fiorentina	Turin
	Padovano 9'	Report		Stadium: Stadio delle Alpi; Referee: Fiorenzo Treossi

12 October 1996 5	Fiorentina	0–0	Lazio	Florence
		Report		Stadium: Stadio Artemio Franchi; Referee: Domenico Messina

20 October 1996 6	Bologna	0–2	Fiorentina	Bologna
		Report	Batistuta 44'; De Marchi 80' (o.g.)	Stadium: Stadio Renato Dall'Ara; Referee: Graziano Cesari

27 October 1996 7	Fiorentina	1–0	Milan	Florence
	Robbiati 84'	Report		Stadium: Stadio Artemio Franchi; Referee: Alfredo Trentalange

3 November 1996 8	Parma	0–0	Fiorentina	Parma
		Report		Stadium: Stadio Ennio Tardini; Referee: Stefano Farina

16 November 1996 9	Internazionale	2–2	Fiorentina	Milan
	Ganz 50'; Ince 83'	Report	Oliveira 44', 64'	Stadium: San Siro; Referee: Livio Bazzoli

24 November 1996 10	Fiorentina	1–1	Piacenza	Florence
	Robbiati 26'	Report	Luiso 64' (pen.)	Stadium: Stadio Artemio Franchi; Referee: Angelo Bonfrisco

1 December 1996 11	Roma	3–3	Fiorentina	Rome
	Balbo 15' (pen.); Delvecchio 72'; Totti 87'	Report	Rui Costa 22'; Batistuta 31', 75'	Stadium: Stadio Olimpico; Referee: Pierluigi Collina

8 December 1996 12	Fiorentina	4–1	Perugia	Florence
	Batistuta 48'; Rui Costa 62'; Oliveira 86'; Rocco 90' (o.g.)	Report	Gautieri 56'	Stadium: Stadio Artemio Franchi; Referee: Robert Anthony Boggi

15 December 1996 13	Udinese	2–0	Fiorentina	Udine
	Amoroso 19', 29'	Report		Stadium: Stadio Friuli; Referee: Roberto Bettin

22 December 1996 14	Fiorentina	2–0	Cagliari	Florence
	Batistuta 65'; Robbiati 82'	Report		Stadium: Stadio Artemio Franchi; Referee: Giancarlo Lana

5 January 1997 15	Fiorentina	3–0	Napoli	Florence
	Colonnese 50' (o.g.); Oliveira 54'; Robbiati 90'	Report		Stadium: Stadio Artemio Franchi; Referee: Pierluigi Pairetto

12 January 1997 16	Reggiana	0–0	Fiorentina	Reggio Emilia
		Report		Stadium: Stadio Giglio; Referee: Alfredo Trentalange

19 January 1997 17	Fiorentina	1–1	Sampdoria	Florence
	Batistuta 31' (pen.)	Report	Franceschetti 89'	Stadium: Stadio Artemio Franchi; Referee: Pierluigi Collina

26 January 1997 18	Vicenza	3–2	Fiorentina	Vicenza
	Otero 1'; Murgita 37'; Ambrosetti 57'	Report	Padalino 22'; Batistuta 65'	Stadium: Stadio Romeo Menti; Referee: Salvatore Racalbuto

2 February 1997 19	Fiorentina	0–0	Atalanta	Florence
		Report		Stadium: Stadio Artemio Franchi; Referee: Gianni Beschin

16 February 1997 20	Hellas Verona	2–1	Fiorentina	Verona
	Falcone 1' (o.g.); Manetti 90'	Report	Batistuta 7'	Stadium: Stadio Marc'Antonio Bentegodi; Referee: Cosimo Bolognino

23 February 1997 21	Fiorentina	1–1	Juventus	Florence
	Robbiati 90'	Report	Del Piero 15'	Stadium: Stadio Artemio Franchi; Referee: Livio Bazzoli

1 March 1997 22	Lazio	1–0	Fiorentina	Rome
	Negro 90'	Report		Stadium: Stadio Olimpico; Referee: Gennaro Borriello

9 March 1997 23	Fiorentina	3–2	Bologna	Florence
	Baiano 19' (pen.); Batistuta 61'; Robbiati 79'	Report	Andersson 2'; Firicano 25' (o.g.)	Stadium: Stadio Artemio Franchi; Referee: Pasquale Rodomonti

15 March 1997 24	Milan	2–0	Fiorentina	Milan
	Desailly 62'; Albertini 90' (pen.)	Report		Stadium: San Siro; Referee: Robert Anthony Boggi

23 March 1997 25	Fiorentina	1–0	Parma	Florence
	Thuram 34' (o.g.)	Report		Stadium: Stadio Artemio Franchi; Referee: Domenico Messina

5 April 1997 26	Fiorentina	0–0	Internazionale	Florence
		Report		Stadium: Stadio Artemio Franchi; Referee: Graziano Cesari

13 April 1997 27	Piacenza	1–1	Fiorentina	Piacenza
	Luiso 66'	Report	Amoruso 56'	Stadium: Stadio Leonardo Garilli; Referee: Gianni Beschin

19 April 1997 28	Fiorentina	2–1	Roma	Florence
	Robbiati 7'; Petruzzi 36' (o.g.)	Report	Balbo 77'	Stadium: Stadio Artemio Franchi; Referee: Stefano Farina

4 May 1997 29	Perugia	1–1	Fiorentina	Perugia
	Pizzi 89' (pen.)	Report	Robbiati 90'	Stadium: Stadio Renato Curi; Referee: Pierluigi Pairetto

11 May 1997 30	Fiorentina	2–3	Udinese	Florence
	Padalino 5'; Baiano 21'	Report	Amoroso 2', 60' (pen.); Pierini 82'	Stadium: Stadio Artemio Franchi; Referee: Gennaro Borriello

15 May 1997 31	Cagliari	4–1	Fiorentina	Cagliari
	Muzzi 14'; Darío Silva 35'; Lønstrup 37', 45'	Report	Oliveira 34'	Stadium: Stadio Sant'Elia; Referee: Domenico Messina

18 May 1997 32	Napoli	2–2	Fiorentina	Naples
	Aglietti 67'; Esposito 83'	Report	Oliveira 8', 40'	Stadium: Stadio San Paolo; Referee: Roberto Bettin

25 May 1997 33	Fiorentina	3–0	Reggiana	Florence
	Batistuta 7', 62'; Robbiati 18'	Report		Stadium: Stadio Artemio Franchi; Referee: Pierangelo Pin

1 June 1997 34	Sampdoria	1–1	Fiorentina	Genoa
	Montella 37'	Report	Robbiati 23'	Stadium: Stadio Luigi Ferraris; Referee: Lorenzo Branzoni

=== Coppa Italia ===
==== Final phase ====
23 October 1996	Bologna	3–1	Fiorentina	Bologna
	Magoni 16'; Paramatti 61'; Scapolo 71'		Orlando 35'	Stadium: Stadio Renato Dall'Ara; Referee: Pierluigi Pairetto

=== UEFA Cup Winners' Cup ===
==== First round ====
12 September 1996 First leg	Gloria Bistriţa (Romania)	1–1	(Italy) Fiorentina	Bistrița, Romania
	Lazăr 3'		Batistuta 47'	Stadium: Stadionul Gloria; Attendance: 10,000; Referee: Christer Fällström (Sweden)

26 September 1996 Second leg	Fiorentina (Italy)	1–0 (2–1 agg.)	(Romania) Gloria Bistriţa	Florence, Italy
	Orlando 22'			Stadium: Stadio Artemio Franchi; Attendance: 18,607; Referee: Ladislav Gádoši (Slovakia)

==== Second round ====
17 October 1996 First leg	Fiorentina (Italy)	2–1	(Czech Republic) Sparta Prague	Florence, Italy
	Batistuta 5'; Schwarz 56'		Siegl 80'	Stadium: Stadio Artemio Franchi; Attendance: 22,400; Referee: Serge Muhmenthaler (Switzerland)

31 October 1996 Second leg	Sparta Prague (Czech Republic)	1–1 (2–3 agg.)	(Italy) Fiorentina	Prague, Czech Republic
	Lokvenc 4'		Robbiati 63'	Stadium: Stadion Letná; Attendance: 16,021; Referee: David Elleray (England)

==== Quarter-finals ====
6 March 1997 First leg	Benfica (Portugal)	0–2	(Italy) Fiorentina	Lisbon, Portugal
			Baiano 45'; Batistuta 90'	Stadium: Estádio da Luz; Attendance: 20,000; Referee: Hellmut Krug (Germany)

20 March 1997 Second leg	Fiorentina (Italy)	0–1 (2–1 agg.)	(Portugal) Benfica	Florence, Italy
			Edgar 22'	Stadium: Stadio Artemio Franchi; Attendance: 35,071; Referee: Mario van der Ende (Netherlands)

==== Semi-finals ====
10 April 1997 First leg	Barcelona (Spain)	1–1	(Italy) Fiorentina	Barcelona, Spain
	Nadal 42'		Batistuta 62'	Stadium: Camp Nou; Attendance: 105,000; Referee: Bernd Heynemann (Germany)

24 April 1997 Second leg	Fiorentina (Italy)	0–2 (1–3 agg.)	(Spain) Barcelona	Florence, Italy
			Couto 30'; Guardiola 35'	Stadium: Stadio Artemio Franchi; Attendance: 45,000; Referee: Anders Frisk (Sweden)

== Statistics ==
=== Players statistics ===
No.	Pos	Nat	Player	Total		Serie A		Coppa		UEFA	
No.	Pos	Nat	Player	Apps	Goals	Apps	Goals	Apps	Goals	Apps	Goals
1	GK	(Italy) ITA	Toldo	32	-40	32	-40				
2	DF	(Italy) ITA	Carnasciali	20	0	20	0				
5	DF	(Italy) ITA	Amoruso	23	1	21+2	1				
17	DF	(Italy) ITA	Pusceddu	28	0	21+7	0				
19	DF	(Italy) ITA	Padalino	21	2	20+1	2				
16	DF	(Italy) ITA	Falcone	31	0	27+4	0				
7	MF	(Sweden) SWE	Schwarz	24	0	24	0				
14	MF	(Italy) ITA	Cois	25	0	20+5	0				
10	MF	(Portugal) POR	Rui Costa	28	2	28	2				
9	FW	(Argentina) ARG	Batistuta	32	12	32	12				
11	FW	(Belgium) BEL	Oliveira	31	9	28+3	9				
22	GK	(Italy) ITA	Mareggini	2	-1	2	-1				
23	FW	(Italy) ITA	Robbiati	30	11	18+12	11				
6	DF	(Italy) ITA	Firicano	18	0	17+1	0				
4	MF	(Italy) ITA	Piacentini	23	0	15+8	0				
3	DF	(Italy) ITA	Serena	14	0	14	0				
20	MF	(Italy) ITA	Bigica	17	0	12+5	0				
8	FW	(Italy) ITA	Baiano	21	2	9+12	2				
32	MF	(Russia) RUS	Kanchelskis	9	0	9	0				
18	MF	(Italy) ITA	Orlando	16	0	3+13	0				
21	MF	(Italy) ITA	Vendrame	2	0	1+1	0				
29	MF	(Italy) ITA	Benin	1	0	1	0				
13	MF	(Italy) ITA	Stefani	2	0	0+2	0				
31	DF	(Italy) ITA	Chiarini	1	0	0+1	0				
12	GK	(Italy) ITA	Zandona	0	0	0	0				
	GK	(Italy) ITA	Passarini								
	MF	(Italy) ITA	Mirri	0	0	0	0				
	FW	(Italy) ITA	Mussi								

- Source: http://calcio-seriea.net/allenatori_squadra/1996/1110/

=== Goalscorers ===
- (Argentina) Gabriel Batistuta 13 (2)
- (Italy) Anselmo Robbiati 12
- (Belgium) Luís Oliveira 9
