= 1994–95 Cagliari Calcio season =

Cagliari F.C.
1994–95 season
- Chairman: Massimo Cellino
- Manager: Óscar Tabárez
- Stadium: Sant'Elia
- Serie A: 9th
- Coppa Italia: Eightfinals
- Top goalscorer: League: Muzzi (12); All: Muzzi (12)
Home colours	Away colours

In the 1994–95 season Cagliari Calcio is competing in Serie A and Coppa Italia.

== Squad ==
Note: Flags indicate national team as defined under FIFA eligibility rules; some limited exceptions apply. Players may hold more than one non-FIFA nationality.

Pos.	Nation	Player
GK	ITA	Valerio Fiori
GK	ITA	Nicola Dibitonto
GK	ITA	Alessio Scarpi
DF	ITA	Giuseppe Pancaro
DF	ITA	Vittorio Pusceddu
DF	ITA	Matteo Villa
DF	ITA	Nicolò Napoli
DF	ITA	Aldo Firicano (captain)
DF	ITA	Francesco Bellucci
DF	ITA	Andrea Benassi
DF	ITA	Simone Veronese
MF	ITA	Pierpaolo Bisoli

Pos.	Nation	Player
MF	ITA	Daniele Berretta
MF	ITA	Christian Lantignotti
MF	URU	José Herrera
MF	ITA	Marco Sanna
MF	ITA	Massimiliano Allegri
MF	ITA	Antonio Bitetti
MF	ITA	Vincenzo Bevo
MF	ITA	Massimo Belluomini
FW	PAN	Dely Valdés
FW	BRA	Luís Oliveira
FW	ITA	Roberto Muzzi

=== Transfers ===
In
Pos.	Name	from	Type
MF	Christian Lantignotti	Reggiana	-
MF	Daniele Berretta	AS Roma	-
DF	Andrea Benassi	Massese	-
DF	Antonio Bitetti	Matera	-
MF	Luigi Molino	Olbia	-

Out
Pos.	Name	To	Type
MF	Francesco Moriero	AS Roma	
DF	Dario Marcolin	Genoa	loan
MF	Antonio Aloisi	Cesena	
MF	Gianfranco Matteoli	Perugia	
FW	Antonio Criniti	Palermo	

==== Winter ====
In
Pos.	Name	from	Type
FW	Roberto Muzzi	AS Roma	-

Out
Pos.	Name	To	Type

== Competitions ==
=== Serie A ===
==== League table ====
Pos	Team	Pld	W	D	L	GF	GA	GD	Pts
7	Napoli	34	13	12	9	40	45	−5	51
8	Sampdoria	34	13	11	10	51	37	+14	50
9	Cagliari	34	13	10	11	40	39	+1	49
10	Fiorentina	34	12	11	11	61	57	+4	47
11	Torino	34	12	9	13	44	48	−4	45

Source: Serie A, RSSSF.com, Soccerway
Rules for classification: 1) Points; 2) Head-to-head points; 3) Head-to-head goal difference; 4) Goal difference; 5) Goals scored; 6) Draw. (Note: Head-to-head record is used only after all the matches between the teams in question have been played).

==== Results by round ====
Round	1	2	3	4	5	6	7	8	9	10	11	12	13	14	15	16	17	18	19	20	21	22	23	24	25	26	27	28	29	30	31	32	33	34
Ground	A	H	A	H	A	H	A	H	A	H	A	H	A	A	H	A	H	H	A	H	A	H	A	H	A	H	A	H	A	H	H	A	H	A
Result	L	D	L	W	D	W	D	W	L	W	D	D	L	L	D	D	W	W	D	W	W	W	L	L	L	W	D	W	D	W	L	W	L	L
Position	12	12	15	13	13	11	12	10	10	8	8	10	10	11	12	12	10	9	8	8	8	7	7	9	10	10	10	8	8	7	8	6	7	9

Source: Competitive matches
A = Away; H = Home; W = Win; D = Draw; L = Loss; = Leader, 1995–96 UEFA Champions League Group stage; = 1995–96 UEFA Cup First round; = 1995–96 Serie B

==== Matches ====
4 September 1994 1	Fiorentina	2–1	Cagliari	Florence
	Napoli 11'; Batistuta 80'	Report	Herrera 75'	Stadium: Artemio Franchi

11 September 1994 2	Cagliari	1–1	Milan	Cagliari
	34' Dely Valdés	Report	12' Gullit	Stadium: Sant'Elia

18 September 1994 3	Parma	2–1	Cagliari	Parma
	Dino Baggio 30'; Couto 45'	Report	56' Oliveira; (red card) 57' Pancaro	Stadium: Il Tardini

25 September 1994 4	Cagliari	2–0	Brescia	Cagliari
	5' Firicano; 40' Dely Valdés	Report		Stadium: Sant'Elia

2 October 1994 5	Bari	0–0	Cagliari	Bari
		Report

15 October 1994 6	Cagliari	1–0	Cremonese	Cagliari
	39' Oliveira	Report	(red card) 16' Dall'Igna	Stadium: Sant'Elia

23 October 1994 7	Roma	1–1	Cagliari	Rome
	90' Balbo	Report	58'Bisoli; (red card) 89' Sanna	Stadium: Olimpico

30 October 1994 8	Cagliari	1–0	Torino	Cagliari
	3' Dely Valdés	Report		Stadium: Sant'Elia

6 November 1994 9	Foggia	2–0	Cagliari	Foggia
	47'Bressan; 90'Bresciani P.	Report

20 November 1994 10	Cagliari	1–0	Genoa	Cagliari
	83'Pusceddu	Report		Stadium: Sant'Elia

27 November 1994 11	Reggiana	0–0	Cagliari	Reggio Emilia
		Report		Stadium: Stadio Giglio

4 December 1994 12	Cagliari	1–1	Lazio	Cagliari
	60' (pen.) Herrera	Report	72' Fuser; (red card) 59' Chamot	Stadium: Sant'Elia

11 December 1994 13	Padova	2–1	Cagliari	Padua
	56' Filippo Maniero; 89' Vlaovic	Report	77' Muzzi	Stadium: Stadio Euganeo

18 December 1994 14	Sampdoria	5–0	Cagliari	Genoa
	8' Lombardo; 14' Gullit; 19' Gullit; 45' Mancini; 67'Bellucci C.	Report		Stadium: Stadio Luigi Ferraris

8 January 1995 15	Cagliari	1–1	Inter	Cagliari
	46' Muzzi; (red card) 18' Oliveira	Report	5' (pen.) Sosa; (red card) 18' Bia; (red card) 84' Bergomi	Stadium: Sant'Elia

15 January 1995 16	Napoli	1–1	Cagliari	Naples
	23' André Cruz	Report	32' Muzzi	Stadium: Stadio San Paolo

22 January 1995 17	Cagliari	3–0	Juventus	Cagliari
	6' Oliveira; 52' Dely Valdés; 65' (pen.) Muzzi	Report		Stadium: Sant'Elia

29 January 1995 18	Cagliari	2–0	Fiorentina	Cagliari
	Muzzi 32'; Herrera 90' (pen.)	Report		Stadium: Sant'Elia

12 February 1995 19	Milan	1–1	Cagliari	Milan
	Panucci 53'	Report	14' Muzzi	Stadium: San Siro

19 February 1995 20	Cagliari	2–0	Parma	Cagliari
	Berretta 6'; Oliveira 15'	Report		Stadium: Sant'Elia

26 February 1995 21	Brescia	2–3	Cagliari	Brescia
	Cadete 12'; Battistini S. 62'	Report	55' Oliveira; 83' Muzzi; 85' Herrera	Stadium: Stadio Mario Rigamonti

5 March 1995 22	Cagliari	2–1	Bari	Cagliari
	Dely Valdés 16'; Muzzi 41'	Report	4' Amoruso	Stadium: Sant'Elia

12 March 1995 23	Cremonese	2–0	Cagliari	Cremona
	Milanese 50'; Chiesa 78'	Report	(red card) 77' Firicano

19 March 1995 24	Cagliari	0–1	Roma	Cagliari
		Report	18' (pen.) Balbo	Stadium: Sant'Elia

2 April 1995 25	Torino	3–2	Cagliari	Turin
	Rizzitelli 42'; Pelé 77'; Pelé 79'	Report	3' Muzzi; 64' Muzzi	Stadium: Stadio Delle Alpi

9 April 1995 26	Cagliari	2–1	Foggia	Cagliari
	Pusceddu 10'; Dely Valdés 67'	Report	63' Cappellini	Stadium: Sant'Elia

14 April 1995 27	Genoa	1–1	Cagliari	Genoa
	Dely Valdés 63'	Report	75' Skuhravy	Stadium: Stadio Luigi Ferraris

23 April 1995 28	Cagliari	4–2	Reggiana	Cagliari
	Oliveira 18'; Muzzi 23'; Muzzi 68'; Oliveira 84'	Report	37' Padovano; 77' Futre	Stadium: Sant'Elia

30 April 1995 29	Lazio	0–0	Cagliari	Rome
		Report		Stadium: Stadio Olimpico

7 May 1995 30	Cagliari	2–0	Padova	Cagliari
	Firicano 57'; Gabrieli 88' (o.g.)	Report	(red card) 70' Bonaiuti	Stadium: Sant'Elia

14 May 1995 31	Cagliari	0–2	Sampdoria	Cagliari
	Herrera (red card) 70'; Oliveira (red card) 90'	Report	62' Mancini; 73' Mancini	Stadium: Sant'Elia

21 May 1995 32	Inter	1–2	Cagliari	Milan
	Sosa 17', (red card) 90'	Report	45' Dely Valdés; 56' (o.g.) Paganin	Stadium: Stadio Giuseppe Meazza

28 May 1995 33	Cagliari	0–1	Napoli	Cagliari
	(red card) 83' Oliveira	Report	16' Pecchia; (red card) 83' Cannavaro; (penalty missed) 86' Andre Cruz	Stadium: Sant'Elia

4 June 1995 34	Juventus	3–1	Cagliari	Turin
	Del Piero 20'; Vialli 66'; Ravanelli 88'	Report	60' Allegri	Stadium: Stadio Delle Alpi

=== Eightfinals ===
12 October 1994	Parma	2–0	Cagliari	Parma
20:30 CEST (UTC+01:00)	D. Baggio 10'; Couto 42'	Report		Stadium: Stadio Ennio Tardini; Referee: Livio Bazzoli

27 October 1994	Cagliari	1–1 (1–3 agg.)	Parma	Cagliari
20:30 CEST (UTC+01:00)	Herrera (yellow card) 27'; Bisoli (yellow card) 76'; Valdés 90'	Report	Couto (yellow card) 29'; Sensini 90'	Stadium: Stadio Sant'Elia; Referee: Robert Anthony Boggi

== Statistics ==
=== Squad statistics ===
No.	Pos	Nat	Player	Total		Serie A	
No.	Pos	Nat	Player	Apps	Goals	Apps	Goals
	GK	(Italy) ITA	Valerio Fiori	29	-32	29	-32
	DF	(Italy) ITA	Giuseppe Pancaro	24	0	20+4	0
	DF	(Italy) ITA	Nicolò Napoli	30	0	29+1	0
	DF	(Italy) ITA	Vittorio Pusceddu	32	2	32	2
	DF	(Italy) ITA	Aldo Firicano	30	2	30	2
	MF	(Italy) ITA	Pierpaolo Bisoli	33	1	33	1
	MF	(Italy) ITA	Matteo Villa	23	0	20+3	0
	MF	(Uruguay) URU	José Herrera	31	4	27+4	4
	FW	(Panama) PAN	Dely Valdés	32	8	31+1	8
	FW	(Brazil) BRA	Luís Oliveira	30	7	30	7
	FW	(Italy) ITA	Roberto Muzzi	22	12	19+3	12
	GK	(Italy) ITA	Nicola Dibitonto	5	-7	5	-7
	MF	(Italy) ITA	Daniele Berretta	29	1	16+13	1
	MF	(Italy) ITA	Marco Sanna	21	0	16+5	0
	DF	(Italy) ITA	Francesco Bellucci	15	0	13+2	0
	MF	(Italy) ITA	Massimiliano Allegri	24	1	13+11	1
	MF	(Italy) ITA	Christian Lantignotti	12	0	11+1	0
	GK	(Italy) ITA	Alessio Scarpi	0	0	0	0
	DF	(Italy) ITA	Andrea Benassi	0	0	0	0
	DF	(Italy) ITA	Simone Veronese	0	0	0	0
	MF	(Italy) ITA	Antonio Bitetti	0	0	0	0
	FW	(Italy) ITA	Luigi Molino	0	0	0	0
	FW	(Italy) ITA	Francesco Tribuna	0	0	0	0

- Source: http://calcio-seriea.net/presenze/1994/1075/
