= Andrei Kanchelskis =

Russian association football player and manager

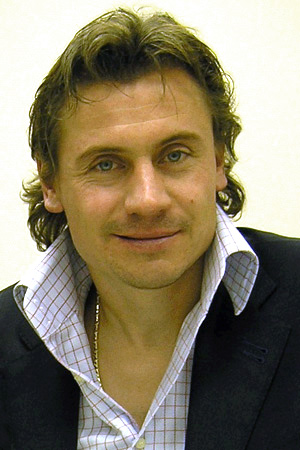
- Kanchelskis in 2001

Personal information
- Full name: Andrei Antanasovich Kanchelskis
- Date of birth: 23 January 1969 (age 57)
- Place of birth: Kirovohrad, Ukrainian SSR, Soviet Union (now Kropyvnytskyi, Ukraine)
- Height: 5 ft 10 in (1.78 m)
- Position: Winger

Senior career*
Years	Team	Apps	(Gls)
1986–1987	Zirka Kirovohrad	68	(5)
1988–1990	Dynamo Kyiv	22	(1)
1990–1991	Shakhtar Donetsk	21	(3)
1991–1995	Manchester United	123	(28)
1995–1997	Everton	52	(19)
1997–1998	Fiorentina	26	(2)
1998–2002	Rangers	76	(13)
2001	→ Manchester City (loan)	10	(0)
2002–2003	Southampton	1	(0)
2003	Al Hilal	7	(0)
2004	Dynamo Moscow	0	(0)
2004–2005	Saturn Ramenskoye	32	(3)
2006	Krylia Sovetov	22	(1)
Total		460	(76)

International career
1989–1990	Soviet Union U21	8	(1)
1989–1991	Soviet Union	17	(3)
1992	CIS	6	(0)
1992–1998	Russia	36	(4)

Managerial career
- 2010: Torpedo-ZIL Moscow
- 2011–2012: Ufa
- 2014: Jūrmala
- 2016: Solyaris Moscow
- 2018–2019: Navbahor Namangan
- 2019–2020: Navbahor Namangan
- 2023–2024: Muras United
- 2024–2026: Dynamo Bryansk
Medal record
Men's football
Representing Soviet Union
UEFA European Under-21 Championship
Winner	1990	U21 Team
- * Club domestic league appearances and goals

Andrei Antanasovich Kanchelskis (Russian: Андрей Антанасович Канчельскис; Ukrainian: Андрій Антанасович Канчельскіс; born 23 January 1969) is a Russian professional football coach and former player. He was the most recently the manager of Dynamo Bryansk. During his playing career, he won two Premier League titles, the FA Cup, the Football League Cup, two FA Charity Shields and the European Super Cup with Manchester United, before going on to win the Scottish Premier League, Scottish Cup and Scottish League Cup twice each with Rangers.

Kanchelskis began his career with his hometown team Zirka Kirovohrad in 1986, before transferring to Dynamo Kyiv in the Soviet Top League, and later to rivals Shakhtar Donetsk. He then moved abroad, signing for English club Manchester United, where he helped the team win their first league championship in 26 years. He moved to Everton in 1995 where he spent 18 months, before transferring to Italian club Fiorentina for a record fee for a Soviet-born player. Following an injury-marred spell in Italy, Kanchelskis moved to Scottish club Rangers, where he won a domestic treble in his first season. After falling out of favour, his career became nomadic, playing for Manchester City and Southampton in England, and Saudi club Al Hilal, before playing in Russia for the first time for Saturn Ramenskoye and Krylia Sovetov, where he played his last games before retiring in 2007. Kanchelskis is the only player to have scored in each of the Manchester, Merseyside, and Old Firm derbies.

After his playing career had finished, Kanchelskis became the general director of Nosta Novotroitsk in 2008, before moving into club management in 2010, managing Torpedo-ZIL Moscow and Ufa in Russia, and then Latvian team Jūrmala in 2014 for three months. In 2016, Kanchelskis returned to management with Solyaris Moscow, and between 2018 and 2020, he had two spells in charge of Navbahor Namangan in Uzbekistan.

Internationally, Kanchelskis represented three different teams. He first played for the Soviet Union in 1989, and scored the nations' last ever goal before the dissolution of the Soviet Union in 1991. During 1992, he played for the CIS, a brief association of former Soviet republics, who he represented at UEFA Euro 1992. Following the tournament, he elected to represent Russia rather than Ukraine, the country of his birth. After boycotting the team for the 1994 FIFA World Cup, he returned and played for Russia during Euro 1996, and won his last cap in 1998. Overall, Kanchelskis was capped 59 times, scoring seven goals. In his youth career for the Soviet Union U21 team, he won the European U21 Championship in 1990.

== Club career ==
=== Early life and career in the Soviet Union ===
External videos
- Two YouTube video
- debut goal in Federation Cup
- first league goal against Dynamo Moscow

Kanchelskis was born in Kirovohrad in the Soviet Union's Ukrainian Soviet Socialist Republic to a Lithuanian father, Antanas, and a Ukrainian mother. Kanchelskis started his career with hometown team Zirka Kropyvnytskyi, known at the time as Zirka Kirovograd. In 1988, he was called up to the army, and had the choice of two teams to transfer to - Dynamo Kyiv and Dnipro. Choosing Dynamo, he received a salary of 250 rubles per month, and described his time in the army as a "good school of life". At Dynamo, Kanchelskis was coached by the legendary Valeriy Lobanovskyi, who he believes is the best manager he played for. Lobanovskyi favoured a 4–4–2 formation, a system which focussed on getting the ball to the flanks and crossing into the penalty box, which Kanchelskis describes as an "English style of play". Kanchelskis had decided to become a winger having seen Brazilian Jairzinho playing in his youth.

His first goal for Dynamo came on 4 November 1988 at the Republican Stadium, scoring the equalising goal against Dynamo Moscow in a 2–1 victory. Kanchelskis eventually decided to leave Dynamo due to lack of game time, causing upset to his mentor Lobanovskyi, who he admired and respected greatly. He then transferred to Shakhtar Donetsk in 1990, where his salary was increased to 700 rubles per week.

=== Moving to England with Manchester United ===
Every player was a brilliant player, it was a great team, an excellent team. We played more relaxed, because everyone was scared of Manchester United. We play away or at home, it doesn't matter, we knew if we concentrated we could win every game, it's no problem for us. That's why we won trophies.

— Kanchelskis recalling the 1993–94 Double winning team

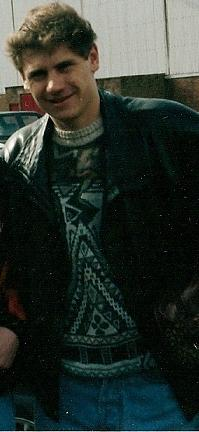
Kanchelskis in 1992 during his time at Manchester United

Kanchelskis signed for Manchester United in a £650,000 deal on 26 March 1991, with United manager Alex Ferguson describing it as a "justifiable risk". Ferguson had discovered Kanchelskis through a VHS tape sent to him by Norwegian agent Rune Hauge, and had been able to personally scout him during a Soviet Union match against Scotland.

He made his United debut in the penultimate league game of the 1990–91 season, a match which United lost 3–0 to Crystal Palace at Selhurst Park, with Ferguson resting several first team players due to their participation in the European Cup Winners' Cup Final. During his time with United, he received help settling in from George Scanlan, employed by the club as an interpreter, who he became close friends with and who later helped write his first autobiography. Kanchelskis came into a United squad who finished the season in 6th position, with Ferguson under increasing pressure to win the league championship.

Kanchelskis won the 1991 European Super Cup with United, defeating European Cup winners Red Star Belgrade 1–0. He established himself as a regular member of the United team, playing in 34 out of 42 league games in the 1991–92 season, as United finished second to Leeds United in a title race that they had led for most of the season, before being overhauled during the final few weeks. However, compensation for Kanchelskis and his teammates had come at Wembley Stadium on 12 April 1992 when a 1–0 win over Nottingham Forest gave them their first ever Football League Cup triumph. Kanchelskis scored five league goals that season, finding the net eight times in all competitions. His first United goal was against Sheffield United in a 2–0 league win at Old Trafford on 2 November 1991.

On the opening day of the new Premiership season, Kanchelskis was one of just 11 foreign (excluding Irish) players starting in the league. (Note: As well as Kanchelskis, the following players started; Craig Forrest (Ipswich Town), Gunnar Halle (Oldham Athletic), John Jensen (Arsenal), Anders Limpar (Arsenal), Roland Nilsson (Sheffield Wednesday), Peter Schmeichel (Manchester United), Hans Segers (Wimbledon), Jan Stejskal (Queens Park Rangers), and Michel Vonk (Manchester City)) Though he primarily played on the right wing, such was the fluidity of United's attacking play that Kanchelskis could switch wings and be as effective, as against defending champions Leeds early in the season, with opposite winger Ryan Giggs delivering a ball from the right to Kanchelskis, drifting from the left wing to the back post, heading into the goal to score United's first in a 2–0 win. Kanchelskis was a regular in the first half of the season before being replaced for the second half of the season by Lee Sharpe, who returned from a bout of viral meningitis, with Giggs now the favoured choice in Sharpe's previous position on the left flank. Nevertheless, Kanchelskis was a key part of the team who won the first ever Premier League title, scoring three goals in 27 league games appearances, as United's 26-year league title wait came to an end.

The 1993–94 season brought more success as United won the Premier League title and the FA Cup, and Kanchelskis was now United's first choice right-winger. 1993–94 was also the first season of squad numbers in the Premier League, and Kanchelskis was issued with the number 14 shirt. Kanchelskis was sent off in the last minute of the League Cup final for deliberate handball; Dean Saunders scored from the resulting penalty, ensuring a 3–1 loss to Aston Villa, a defeat which eventually cost United a domestic treble.

Kanchelskis was United's leading goalscorer in the 1994–95 season with 15 goals in 32 games, but missed the final few weeks of the season due to a hernia, and during that time United surrendered the league title to Blackburn and the FA Cup to Everton. United were also without the suspended Eric Cantona (who was banned for eight months after he assaulted a spectator against Crystal Palace in late January), while Andy Cole was cup-tied for the FA Cup games. His highlight of the 1994–95 season came on 10 November 1994, when he scored a hat-trick for United in their 5–0 home win over neighbours City in the Manchester derby. He had also found the net twice against Blackburn Rovers in a crucial match at Ewood Park on 24 October which United won 4–2. Kanchelskis had played 145 times for United and scored 48 goals in the space of four years, but he had fallen out with manager Alex Ferguson earlier in the season and failed to patch up his differences with the manager. He was placed on the transfer list in July 1995 and on his departure, he was eventually replaced on the right-hand side of United's midfield by David Beckham.

=== Leaving United and signing for Everton ===
Bryan Robson made an approach to sign Kanchelskis for Middlesbrough when it was announced that United would be selling him, bidding £4.5m in July 1995, while there was also interest from Arsenal. Robson believed his friendship with Kanchelskis could secure the transfer in Middlesbrough's favour. Kanchelskis confirmed that he would be leaving United, blaming Ferguson for his imminent departure, and eventually agreed to join Everton in August, but the transfer was cancelled due to a claim by Shakhtar Donetsk for money. Kanchelskis was subsequently registered with United for European competition, with the belief he could yet remain with the club, but a compromise between United, Everton and Shakhtar was reached, and he signed for Everton after the beginning of the 1995–96 season, in time for a fixture against Southampton. Everton paid a club record £5m fee for Kanchelskis, signing a four-year contract worth £13,000 per week.

United manager Ferguson later claimed in his autobiography that he was offered a bung of £40,000 to force through a transfer by Grigory Essaoulenko, the agent of Kanchelskis, who denied the allegations. In 1997, an inquiry into potential transfer irregularities in English football was unable to obtain information regarding Kanchelskis' transfers as the owner of Shakhtar, Akhat Bragin, had been murdered with an explosive device. The Independent later uncovered that Bragin had stolen over £500k in 1991 when Kanchelskis had transferred to United, money which had been deposited into a Swiss bank account by Manchester United, a fact which was only realised by other Shakhtar officials, including Ravil Safiullin, when Kanchelskis transferred to Everton. Kanchelskis, who was contracted to Scottish team Rangers by the time of Ferguson's allegations, denied any involvement, and said Essaoulenko hadn't been his agent since 1991.

I remember the good times here and in that first season I scored 16 goals and was top scorer at the club. In the second season there were financial problems and we couldn't buy the players that we wanted... The directors told me that they needed the funds to buy new players. It was a good investment for the club to buy me for £5 million and sell me for £8 million. I'd have liked to stay here because this is where my family was, living in Manchester, and my kids were born here. But this is football, this is life.

— Kanchelskis on his time with Everton and his sudden departure

Having missed the Charity Shield curtain raiser against Blackburn due to the delay of the transfer, he made his debut in the match against Southampton, with Everton winning 2–0, their first win of the season. During his first game against Manchester United, since he joined Everton, in early September, Kanchelskis suffered a shoulder injury early into the game following a late tackle by Sharpe, and was substituted off after 14 minutes in an eventual 3–2 defeat. He returned to action against Bolton Wanderers a month later, missing two chances to score in a 1–1 draw. He rapidly gained cult status with Everton supporters especially after his two goals against Merseyside rivals Liverpool at Anfield, his first for the club, ensured a 2–1 win, Everton's first triumph at the stadium since 1986. A week later, he put in a Man of the Match performance in a 2–2 draw with Sheffield Wednesday, scoring Everton's first three minutes into injury time in the first half, before assisting the equaliser for Daniel Amokachi.

His first season with the club saw him score 16 goals, including 10 goals in the last 10 matches, to cap a season of excellent performances which made him arguably the best right-winger in the country; his 16 goals was the Everton goalscoring joint-record in the Premier League, shared with Tony Cottee, for 20 years until Romelu Lukaku broke the record in 2016. On 24 February 1996, Kanchelskis scored the opening goal in a 3–0 win against Nottingham Forest, which moved them into 7th place for the first time since August, increasing their chances of UEFA Cup qualification. On 16 April, he again scored against Liverpool, this time in a 1–1 draw, a result which hampered Everton's prospects of qualifying for Europe. He scored his second hat-trick in English football during a 5–2 win at Sheffield Wednesday on 27 April, the first Everton player to score hat-trick in any competition for over two years. Everton ultimately missed out on a UEFA Cup, results not going their way on the final weekend of the season.

In late January 1997, Kanchelskis was subject to a bid of £6m from Italian club Fiorentina, and Fiorentina director Luciano Luna claimed personal terms had been agreed for a four-year contract.

=== Injury marred spell with Fiorentina ===
Kanchelskis signed a three-year deal with Fiorentina for a fee of 16 billion lira, signing a four-year contract. The transfer fee was the most expensive for a Russian player, and at the time was one of the most expensive transfers in world football. 1,500 Fiorentina fans turned up to watch Kanchelskis' first training session, and though he passed his medical, Kanchelskis' first match was delayed by an ankle injury, Manager Claudio Ranieri declared Kanchelskis "the best in the world", and club owner Vittorio Cecchi Gori said Fiorentina had beat out A.C. Milan, Spanish club Real Madrid, and Dutch club Ajax to sign Kanchelskis. New teammates Luís Airton Oliveira, Stefan Schwarz, Pasquale Padalino, and Anselmo Robbiati all expressed their joy at the arrival of Kanchelskis, predicting the arrival to be a success for both the team and the player.

Wearing the number 32 shirt, he made his debut against Hellas Verona on 16 February in a 2–1 defeat. Cecchi Gori claimed Kanchelskis had been deliberately targeted by opposition player due to the cost of the transfer. Kanchelskis' early performances were criticised by Italian newspaper la Repubblica, scoring no goals and managing only one shot on goal in his first five appearances. A hard tackle by Roma defender Vincent Candela ended his 1996–97 season prematurely, at which point he had played nine games without scoring. He changed his shirt number to 17 for the 1997–98 season, and his form improved in the opening two matchdays of the Serie A campaign, including scoring his first goal against Bari. During the summer, Ranieri had been replaced by Alberto Malesani, who had faith in the ability of Kanchelskis. However, he suffered an ankle injury after a hard tackle from Internazionale defender Taribo West, punished only with a yellow card. Returning to action after 40 days in a 1998 FIFA World Cup qualifier against Italy in Moscow, he collided with Gianluca Pagliuca and suffered a fracture in his knee, being sidelined until the end of January in a Coppa Italia match.

By the end of the season, he had played 19 appearances in all competitions, scoring two goals, the second of which came on the final day of the season in a 2–0 win against Milan. At the conclusion of the season, Malesani was replaced by Giovanni Trapattoni, who didn't see Kanchelskis as being part of his plans. Speaking in 2019, Cecchi Gori, who at the time had described the purchase of Kanchelskis as the "cherry" of the team, said that it was "inevitable" that Kanchelskis would not have success in Italy due to being targeted by opposition players.

=== Return to Britain ===
After struggling to make an impact in Italy, he was allowed to leave, and signed for Scottish Premier League team Rangers for a national record of £5.5 million, part of the club's total summer spending by manager Dick Advocaat of £25m. His first goal for Rangers came in the first-leg of their UEFA Cup qualification second-round match against Greek side PAOK. On 25 April 1999, Kanchelskis scored the second Rangers goal in a 3–1 win against Aberdeen, moving them within three points of the championship. Rangers went on to win a domestic treble of the league, Scottish Cup, and Scottish League Cup, with Kanchelskis coming on as a substitute as they clinched the third trophy against Old Firm rivals Celtic; in the first fixture of the season against Celtic, Kanchelskis had suffered a broken arm. In his second season with the club, he was dropped from the team, but regained his place in the new year and eventually won the 2000 Scottish Cup Final, amidst reports he could be sold.

During the summer, he was a transfer target for Spanish club Barcelona, who wanted a replacement for Luís Figo, while Joe Royle, manager of Manchester City, declared his interest in reuniting with Kanchelskis, though he eventually opted to stay with Rangers, saying he was having a "great time" with the club. His relationship with Advocaat eventually broke down, and after a training ground bust-up with teammate Fernando Ricksen, followed by him then refusing to play in a match for the Rangers under-21 team, he emerged as a target for Bradford City and Manchester City in January 2001. He chose to return to Manchester, and made his debut on 31 January, coming on as a half-time substitute for Andy Morrison in a 1–1 draw with Liverpool in the league. He played 11 games for City, scoring once in a 4–2 defeat to Liverpool in the FA Cup. Despite his successful time with United, Kanchelskis says the clubs' supporters regularly remind him he played 11 matches for their arch-rivals.

Upon his return to Rangers, he said he was happy to be back and vowed to give his all for the team, but having received little game time and falling behind Russell Latapy in the pecking order, began to consider his future. After his release from Rangers upon the expiration of his contract, he went on trial with Southampton; manager Gordon Strachan said that Kanchelskis had personally phoned him to ask for permission to train with the club. After a successful trial, Kanchelskis signed with Southampton on 30 August, with a contract lasting until the end of the season. Strachan described Kanchelskis as "just too good a player not to have a club", and said Saints players were "learning a lot from him". He made his debut against former club Everton, coming on as a second-half substitution in an eventual 1–0 win. After making only one more appearance, Southampton released him early from his contract in February 2003, and he joined Saudi Arabian team Al Hilal, signing a four-month contract, after rejecting the possibility to move to Sheffield Wednesday on loan. During his time with Southampton, Kanchelskis wore the number 7 shirt previously worn by club legend Matt Le Tissier, and said during a 2021 interview with The Athletic that while he didn't have a problem wearing the number on his shirt, that it was a "bad decision" due to his lack of success at the club.

=== Later career, and retirement ===
His time with Al-Hilal was blighted by a hamstring injury, and he said that though his teammates were skilled, they lacked enthusiasm and passion in matches and training. Kanchelskis played his final game for the club in May 2003, and in July he began training back in England with Brighton & Hove Albion, a club close to his home in Sussex. He would later reveal he decided to leave Saudi Arabia due to the Riyadh compound bombings. With offers from teams in Japan and the possibility of a return to Al-Hilal, Brighton manager Steve Coppell began talks with Kanchelskis to sign for the club, and after a month of training, he was offered a three-month contract by Brighton, but the move was cancelled when he failed to agree personal terms. Coppell had been excited at the prospect of Kanchelskis training with the club, saying: "when he is on the ball you can just see he is a good player. He's been there, done it played on the highest stage... he's just a top quality player and he seems a good lad".

In December 2003, Kanchelskis spoke to Russian media outlet Sport Express of a contract offer from Russian Premier League team Dynamo Moscow. In January 2004, he signed a one-year contract with Dynamo after a trial period with the club. In an interview with Komsomolskaya Pravda, Kanchelskis said he had turned down big-money offers from Qatar and Saudi Arabia in favour of signing for Dynamo. His stay at Dynamo was short-lived when he was sacked for a "disciplinary offence" on the eve of the 2004 season, with manager Jaroslav Hřebík citing a "lack of professionalism". Kanchleskis denied allegations he had turned up to training drunk, and filed an unlawful termination suit with the dispute resolution chamber. In December, the court ruled in favour of Kanchelskis; though he said he had fought against the dismissal "not for money, but for prestige", he was awarded damages equating to his salary from 8 February to 15 December.

Soon after his release from Dynamo, he was training with former international teammate Viktor Onopko at Saturn. At the end of May, Saturn manager Boris Ignatyev confirmed the possibility that Kanchelskis could sign for the club, and in June, Kanchelskis signed a six-month contract with Saturn, with the possibility of a further year. Before making his official debut, he took part in a friendly match against Rubin Kazan. His debut for Saturn wouldn't come for another month, playing in the 14th round of the championship in a 1–1 draw against Amkar Perm. His first two goals for the club came in a 5–1 win against Alania Vladikavkaz. After another year with Saturn and a short spell with Krylia Sovetov, he retired in February 2007, saying "you need to leave at the right time". He scored one goal for Krylia Sovetov, scoring the opening goal in a 2–1 win against Tom Tomsk on 6 May 2006. He played his last competitive game on 25 November.

== International career ==
=== Soviet Union and CIS ===
Kanchelskis was part of the Soviet Union U21 team which won the 1990 UEFA European Under-21 Championship, scoring a goal in the second leg of the final against Yugoslavia U21. Kanchelskis recalls having "no fear" before the first leg, saying the squad was relaxed and had played with "pleasure". He made his senior debut for the Soviet Union in 1989, coming on as a substitute for Gela Ketashvili in the final minute of a 1–1 draw with Poland. He was capped 23 times for the Soviet Union (including its brief successor, the CIS), scoring three goals. He scored, in November 1991 in Cyprus, the last goal in Soviet national team history.

=== Russia ===
After the dissolution of the Soviet Union Kanchelskis chose to represent Russia, considered the USSR's official successor team by FIFA. Though eligible, he immediately dismissed the chance to play for Lithuania, while he rejected Ukraine due to them not being able to qualify for a tournament until Euro 1996. Speaking in 2005 about his choice of representing Russia rather than Ukraine, Kanchelskis described the idea of waiting several years to play international football as an "impermissible luxury", and said he did not regret his choice.

Having struggled in the qualification for the 1994 FIFA World Cup, Russia lost to Greece, and following the match, though he had not played in Athens, Kanchelskis was one of fourteen players to sign a letter sent to Shamil Tarpishchev, calling for the dismissal of manager Pavel Sadyrin and the appointment of Anatoliy Byshovets as the replacement. Kanchelskis was one of five players who refused to be called up to Russia squad for the World Cup, as part of the ongoing player dispute with Sadyrin.

== Style of play ==
Kanchelskis usually played as a right-winger throughout his career, where he was known for his work-rate, pace, explosive acceleration, powerful shot from range, and eye for goal; however, he was not particularly strong in the air. Moreover, he had the ability to run at defenders, put opponents under pressure, and create space for teammates when dribbling with the ball. In addition to his footballing skills, he also stood out for his professionalism, despite his aggressive playing style.

Under his manager Lobanovsky at Dynamo Kyiv, Kanchelskis operated as a traditional "English style" winger in a 4–4–2 formation, looking to receive the ball out wide and cross into the box from the touch-line.

== Post-playing career ==
Shortly after his retirement as a player in February 2007, Kanchelskis became the sporting director of First Division team FC Nosta Novotroitsk, with the intended goal of improving the infrastructure of the club. In August 2009, he was in discussion to become a manager for the first time, with Second Division team Torpedo-ZIL Moscow, but in September it was announced he would remain with Nosta. In November, Kanchelskis resigned from his role with Nosta and re-entered negotiations with Torpedo-ZIL. Having failed to gain promotion in the 2010 season, Kanchelskis blamed the club for failing to spend on players, describing the 300,000 ruble expenditure as "frivolous", and announced his intent to resign from his role.

On 23 December 2010, he was appointed the first manager of the newly founded football club, FC Ufa, and stated that promotion to the Football National League was the goal of the club. The club's first ever match occurred on 20 April 2011, with Ufa playing against Syzran-2003 in the Russian Cup, and although the match ended in a 0–0 draw, Ufa lost 1–0 in the subsequent penalty shootout. Competing in the Second Division, the club began their first league season on 24 April, with Kanchelskis guiding his team to their first ever win, a 3–1 victory against Tyumen, with striker Konstantin Ionov scoring all three goals. In May 2012, it was announced that Kanchelskis had left Ufa, with the club five points behind league leaders Neftekhimik Nizhnekamsk and three matches of the season remaining.

In June 2012, Kanchelskis joined the coaching staff at Volga Nizhny Novgorod, where he spent a year before departing in June 2013. Upon his departure, he said he had had a "good experience" with Volga, and he left satisfied with the year spent with the club. On 31 August 2014, Kanchelskis became the manager of the Latvian Higher League club FC Jūrmala. He was the replacement for Bulgarian manager Gosho Petkov, who had gained 8 points from 28 games, and had left them in last place in the league table, but Kanchelskis failed to avoid relegation. During his spell at Jūrmala, members of the playing squad were regularly unpaid due to the poor on-pitch results. Kanchelskis confirmed his departure in January 2015. In January 2016, Kanchelskis was appointed the new manager of third-tier team Solyaris Moscow following the death of the previous coach Sergey Shustikov. He was sacked on 26 April with the team in second place in the league.

On 9 October 2018, Kanchelskis was appointed manager of the Uzbekistan Super League team Navbahor Namangan, replacing Ilkhom Muminjonov in the role. He signed a contract until the end of the 2018 season, and hired the experienced Russian coach Aleksei Belenkov as his assistant. He won his first game in charge, with midfielder Azizbek Turgunboev scoring the only goal in a 1–0 win against Buxoro. Navbahor finished third in the league as a result of a 1–0 win against rivals Bunyodkor on 21 November. In June 2019, Kanchelskis resigned from his role, citing the unsatisfactory results which had left the team situated in 4th place in the league, having earned 18 points from 12 games. However, in August, he was re-appointed manager of Navbahor, replacing Dejan Đurđević and signing a three-year contract. In August 2020, Kanchelskis confirmed he had tested positive for COVID-19; Navbahor and Kanchelskis requested for the football authorities to postpone the league due to members of the squad also contracting the virus, but were refused. He was released from hospital on 21 September, and the following week, he said he was still recovering slowly. In October 2020, with the team in 7th place in the league after 18 matches, Kanchelskis left Navbahor for a second time, on this occasion due to being unpaid for four months, and submitted an application to FIFA. In August 2021, FIFA ruled in favour of Kanchelskis, ordering Navbahor to pay $1.6 million plus interest. In November, four masked man approached Kanchelskis in a café and threatened to cripple him if he did not take a payment of $80,000. Navbahor released a statement saying that the charges levelled against them were "fictitious, provocative and offensive".

In July 2023, Kanchelskis was appointed as general director of the Kazakh club Tobol. In November 2023, he left his position due to a conflict with the club owner.

On 25 December 2023, Kanchelskis was appointed as Head Coach of Kyrgyz Premier League club Muras United on a one-year contract.

== Personal life ==
Kanchelskis has a son, also named Andrei, as well as a daughter, Eva. Andrei Jr is a supporter of Everton, due to the fondness with which Everton fans remembered his father's short spell with the club. In 1993, Kanchelskis' wife Inna suffered a miscarriage during their first pregnancy.

== Career statistics ==
=== Club ===
Appearances and goals by club, season and competition
Club	Season	League			National cup (Note: Includes Soviet Cup, FA Cup, Coppa Italia, Scottish Cup, Saudi Crown Prince Cup, Russian Cup)		League cup (Note: Includes USSR Federation Cup, Football League Cup, Scottish League Cup)		Continental		Other		Total	
Club	Season	Division	Apps	Goals	Apps	Goals	Apps	Goals	Apps	Goals	Apps	Goals	Apps	Goals
Zirka Kirovohrad	1986	Soviet Second League	17	1	—		—		—		—		17	1
Zirka Kirovohrad	1987	Soviet Second League	51	4	—		—		—		—		51	4
Zirka Kirovohrad	Total		68	5	0	0	0	0	0	0	0	0	68	5
Dynamo Kyiv	1988	Soviet Top League	7	1	1	0	5	2	—		—		13	3
Dynamo Kyiv	1989	Soviet Top League	15	0	3	0	1	0	1 (Note: Appearance(s) in UEFA Cup)	0	—		20	0
Dynamo Kyiv	Total		22	1	4	0	6	2	1	0	0	0	33	3
Shakhtar Donetsk	1990	Soviet Top League	16	2	4	0	2	1	—		—		22	3
Shakhtar Donetsk	1991	Soviet Top League	5	1	0	0	—		—		—		5	1
Shakhtar Donetsk	Total		21	3	4	0	2	1	0	0	0	0	27	4
Manchester United	1990–91	First Division	1	0	—		—		—		—		1	0
Manchester United	1991–92	First Division	34	5	2	1	4	2	1 (Note: Appearance in European Cup Winners' Cup)	0	1 (Note: Appearance in European Super Cup)	0	42	8
Manchester United	1992–93	Premier League	27	3	1	0	3	0	1	0	—		32	3
Manchester United	1993–94	Premier League	31	6	6	3	9	1	0	0	1 (Note: Appearance in FA Charity Shield)	0	47	10
Manchester United	1994–95	Premier League	30	14	3	0	0	0	5 (Note: Appearance(s) in UEFA Champions League)	1	1	0	39	15
Manchester United	Total		123	28	12	4	16	3	7	1	3	0	161	36
Everton	1995–96	Premier League	32	15	4	0	0	0	0	0	—		36	15
Everton	1996–97	Premier League	20	4	2	1	2	1	—		—		24	6
Everton	Total		52	19	6	1	2	1	0	0	0	0	60	21
Fiorentina	1996–97	Serie A	9	0	—		—		0	0	—		9	0
Fiorentina	1997–98	Serie A	17	2	2	0	—		—		—		19	2
Fiorentina	Total		26	2	2	0	—		0	0	—		28	2
Rangers	1998–99	Scottish Premier League	31	7	5	1	2	0	7	1	—		45	9
Rangers	1999–2000	Scottish Premier League	28	4	5	1	2	0	5 (Note: Three appearances in UEFA Champions League, two appearances in UEFA Cup)	0	—		40	5
Rangers	2000–01	Scottish Premier League	7	1	0	0	0	0	7	2	—		14	3
Rangers	2001–02	Scottish Premier League	10	1	3	1	0	0	1	0	—		14	2
Rangers	Total		76	13	13	3	4	0	20	3	—		113	19
Manchester City (loan)	2000–01	Premier League	10	0	1	1	—		—		—		11	1
Southampton	2002–03	Premier League	1	0	0	0	1	0	—		—		2	0
Al Hilal	2002–03	Saudi Premier League	7	0	3	1	—		3 (Note: Appearances in AFC Champions League)	0	—		13	1
Dynamo Moscow	2004	Russian Premier League	—		—		—		—		—		—	
Saturn Ramenskoye	2004	Russian Premier League	12	2	2	1	—		—		—		14	3
Saturn Ramenskoye	2005	Russian Premier League	20	1	5	0	—		—		—		25	1
Saturn Ramenskoye	Total		32	3	7	1	—		—		—		39	4
Krylia Sovetov	2006	Russian Premier League	22	1	2	0	—		—		—		24	1
Career total			460	75	54	11	31	7	31	4	3	0	579	97

=== International ===
Appearances and goals by national team, year and competition
Team	Year	Competitive		Friendly		Total	
Team	Year	Apps	Goals	Apps	Goals	Apps	Goals
Soviet Union	1989	0	0	1	0	1	0
Soviet Union	1990	2 (Note: Appearances and goal in Euro 1992 qualifying)	1	2	0	4	0
Soviet Union	1991	6	2	6	0	12	2
Soviet Union	Total	8	3	9	0	17	3
CIS	1992	3 (Note: Appearances at Euro 1992)	0	3	0	6	0
CIS	Total	3	0	3	0	6	0
Russia	1993	5 (Note: Appearances and goal in 1994 World Cup qualification)	1	1	0	6	1
Russia	1994	2 (Note: Appearances in Euro 1996 qualifying)	0	1	0	3	0
Russia	1995	4	0	1	0	5	0
Russia	1996	5 (Note: Two appearances at UEFA Euro 1996, three appearances and one goal in 1998 World Cup qualification)	1	8	2	13	3
Russia	1997	3 (Note: Appearances in 1998 World Cup qualification)	0	2	0	5	0
Russia	1998	1 (Note: Appearance in Euro 2000 qualifying)	0	3	0	4	0
Russia	Total	20	2	16	2	36	4
Career total		31	5	28	2	59	7

Scores and results list the Soviet Union's and Russia's goal tally first, score column indicates score after each Kanchelskis goal.

List of international goals scored by Andrei Kanchelskis
No.	Date	Venue	Opponent	Score	Result	Competition
Soviet Union goals
1	12 September 1990	Central Lenin Stadium, Moscow, Soviet Union	Norway	1–0	2–0	UEFA Euro 1992 qualifying
2	25 September 1991	Central Lenin Stadium, Moscow, Soviet Union	Hungary	1–0	2–2	UEFA Euro 1992 qualifying
3	13 November 1991	Tsirio Stadium, Larnaca, Cyprus	Cyprus	3–0	3–0	UEFA Euro 1992 qualifying
Russia goals
4	28 April 1993	Luzhniki Stadium, Moscow, Russia	Hungary	1–0	3–0	1994 FIFA World Cup qualification
5	9 February 1996	National Stadium, Ta' Qali, Malta	Iceland	1–0	3–0	1996 Malta International Football Tournament
6	25 May 1996	Khalifa International Stadium, Doha, Qatar	Qatar	2–0	5–2	Friendly
7	10 November 1996	Stade Josy Barthel, Luxembourg City, Luxembourg	Luxembourg	2–0	4–0	1998 FIFA World Cup qualification

== Honours ==
Manchester United

- Premier League: 1992–93, 1993–94
- FA Cup: 1993–94
- Football League Cup: 1991–92; runner-up: 1993–94
- FA Charity Shield: 1993, 1994
- European Super Cup: 1991

Rangers

- Scottish Premier League: 1998–99, 1999–2000
- Scottish Cup: 1998–99, 1999–2000
- Scottish League Cup: 1998–99, 2001–02

Soviet Union U21

- UEFA European Under-21 Championship: 1990

Individual

- Sir Matt Busby Player of the Year: 1994–95
- Premier League Player of the Month: April 1996
