= Gabriel Batistuta =

Argentine footballer (born 1969)

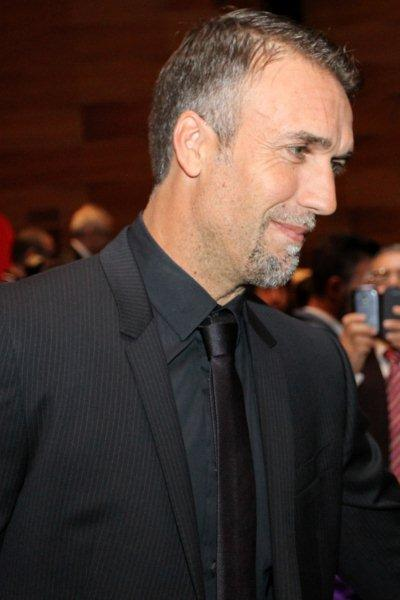
- Batistuta in 2018

Personal information
- Full name: Gabriel Omar Batistuta
- Date of birth: 1 February 1969 (age 57)
- Place of birth: Reconquista, Santa Fe, Argentina
- Height: 1.85 m (6 ft 1 in)
- Position: Striker

Youth career
- 1987–1989: Newell's Old Boys
- 1989: → Sportivo Italiano (loan)

Senior career*
Years	Team	Apps	(Gls)
1988–1989	Newell's Old Boys	24	(7)
1989–1990	River Plate	21	(4)
1990–1991	Boca Juniors	34	(13)
1991–2000	Fiorentina	269	(168)
2000–2003	Roma	63	(30)
2003	→ Inter Milan (loan)	12	(2)
2003–2005	Al-Arabi	21	(25)
Total		444	(249)

International career
1991–2002	Argentina	78	(56)
Medal record
Men's football
Representing Argentina
Copa América
Winner	1991 Chile
Winner	1993 Ecuador
CONMEBOL–UEFA Cup of Champions
Winner	1993 Argentina
FIFA Confederations Cup
Winner	1992 Saudi Arabia
Runner-up	1995 Saudi Arabia
- * Club domestic league appearances and goals

Gabriel Omar Batistuta (Spanish pronunciation: [ɡaˈβɾjel oˈmaɾ βatisˈtuta]; (Note: In isolation, Batistuta is pronounced [batisˈtuta].) born 1 February 1969) is an Argentine former professional footballer. During his playing career, Batistuta was nicknamed Batigol ([batiˈɣol]) as well as El Ángel Gabriel ([el ˌaŋxel ɣaˈβɾjel]; Spanish for Angel Gabriel). Regarded as one of the best strikers of all time, he was named by Pelé in the FIFA 100 list of the world's greatest living players in 2004.

After beginning his career in Argentina in 1988 with Newell's Old Boys, followed by River Plate and Boca Juniors where he won titles, Batistuta played most of his club football with Serie A club Fiorentina in Italy; he is their all-time top scorer in Serie A with 151 goals. When Fiorentina was relegated to Serie B in 1993, Batistuta stayed with the club and helped them return to the top-flight league a year later. He became an icon in Florence; the Fiorentina fans erected a life-size bronze statue of him in 1996, in recognition of his performances for the club. Despite winning the Coppa Italia and the Supercoppa Italiana with the club in 1996, he never won the Serie A title with Fiorentina, but when he moved to Roma in 2000 for €36 million – the highest fee ever paid for a player over the age of 30 until Cristiano Ronaldo moved from Real Madrid to Juventus in 2018 – he won the 2000–01 Serie A title. After a brief loan spell with Inter Milan in 2003, he played his last two seasons in Qatar with Al-Arabi before he retired in 2005.

At international level, Batistuta was Argentina's all-time leading goalscorer with 56 goals in 78 official matches, (Note: 54 goals in 77 appearances at one time because the Argentine Football Association didn't recognize 2 goals, even though FIFA did, two goals Batistuta scored in a 6–0 home win against the Slovakia national youth side on 22 June 1995, in Mendoza, a match which had originally been considered a full international by the Argentine FA but later was removed from the list of official matches. In the most recent update (last updated: 12 May 2022), this match appears to have been re-recognized as official.) a record he held until 21 June 2016, when he was surpassed by Lionel Messi. He participated in three FIFA World Cups, scoring 10 goals, making him Argentina's second top scorer in the competition after Messi, and the joint tenth-highest World Cup goalscorer of all time. Batistuta is the only player in football history to score two hat-tricks in different World Cups. With the Argentina national team he won two consecutive Copa América titles (1991 and 1993), the 1993 CONMEBOL–UEFA Cup of Champions, and the 1992 FIFA Confederations Cup.

== Personal life ==
Batistuta was born on 1 February 1969 to slaughterhouse worker Omar Batistuta and school secretary Gloria Zilli, in the town of Avellaneda, province of Santa Fe, Argentina, but grew up in the nearby city of Reconquista. He has three older sisters, Elisa, Alejandra, and Gabriela. Batistuta is a Roman Catholic. At the age of 16, he met Irina Fernández, his future wife, at her quinceañera, a rite of passage on her 15th birthday. On 28 December 1990, they were married at Saint Roque Church. The couple moved to Florence, Italy, in 1991, and a year later their first son, Thiago, was born.

Due to his performances in the Italian championship and with the Argentina national team, Batistuta gained fame and respect. He filmed several commercials and was invited onto numerous TV shows, but in spite of this, Batistuta always remained a low-profile family man. In 1997, Batistuta's second son, Lucas, was born, his third son, Joaquín, in 1999, his fourth son, Shamel, in 2004 or 2005, and his fifth son, Uzi Isman, in 2006. In 2000, Batistuta and his family moved to Rome, where he played for Roma. Two years after Shamel was born, Batistuta was loaned to Inter. In 2003, after 12 years in Italy, the family moved to Qatar where Batistuta had accepted a lucrative celebrity playing contract with a local team, Al-Arabi, ending his career there in 2005. He moved back to Argentina in 2007.

Despite having completed his coaching badges in Argentina, he currently has no involvement with football, instead (primarily as he has difficulty walking) he prefers to play polo and golf, he was quoted saying: 'I don't like football, it's only my job'. In later interviews with FIFA he expanded: "I lived and breathed football", adding, "when I was playing football I never enjoyed it that much, I was never happy ... if I scored two goals, I wanted a third, I always wanted more. Now it's all over I can look back with satisfaction, but I never felt that way when I was playing." In 2006 he expressed an interest in coaching Australia's and Argentina's national team. During the 2006 FIFA World Cup, he worked as a commentator for Televisa Deportes. Batistuta currently runs his own construction company in Argentina. He also worked as technical secretary in the professional football club Colón, joining the club's staff in January 2012, and leaving at the end of the 2012–13 season.

Speaking in a television interview in Argentina in 2014, Batistuta said the pain suffered in his ankles after retiring in 2005 became so intense that he "urinated in bed with the toilet only a few steps away. I couldn't move." He visited a doctor he knew asking his legs be amputated, but the doctor turned down his request. Although he later underwent surgery to relieve the pressure on his cartilage and tendons and his condition improved slightly, in a 2017 interview, he stated that he still had difficulty walking and faced mobility issues as a result of the stresses and injuries he faced throughout his football career due to overexerting himself. He has, however, still been able to take part in charity football games, and in 2014, he scored twice – one a trademark finish with a powerful 35 yard strike into the roof of the net – in a game in Italy.

Batistuta lived in Perth, Western Australia but due to personal reasons, he moved back to Argentina.

== Club career ==
=== Early career ===
As a child, Batistuta preferred other sports to football. Because of his height he played basketball, but after Argentina's victory in the 1978 FIFA World Cup, in which he was particularly impressed by the skills of Mario Kempes, he devoted himself to football. After playing with friends on the streets and in the small Grupo Alegria club, Batistuta joined the local Platense junior team. While with Platense he was selected for the Reconquista team that won the provincial championship following victory over Newell's Old Boys. Batistuta's two goals drew the attention of the opposition team's coach Marcelo Bielsa, and he signed a professional contract with Newell's in 1988.

=== Newell's Old Boys ===
At Newell's Old Boys under Bielsa, who would later become Batistuta's national coach with the Argentina national team, things did not come easily for him during his first year with the club. He was away from home, his family, and his girlfriend Irina, sleeping in a room at the stadium, and had a weight problem that slowed his progress. At the end of that year, Batistuta was loaned to a smaller team, Deportivo Italiano, with whom he participated in the Carnevale Cup in Italy, ending as top scorer with three goals. Under the guidance of Bielsa, whom Batistuta described in his autobiography as the most important coach he has ever had, and "the one who taught me how to train on rainy days, he taught me everything", he was physically transformed, fed encouragement, and was set on the path into the player he was to become.

=== River Plate ===
In mid-1989, Batistuta made the leap to one of Argentina's biggest clubs, River Plate, where he scored 4 goals and River Plate won the Argentine Primera División in 1990. However, he was drawn out of the team by the new manager Daniel Passarella in the mid-season, apparently with no specific reason. According to Batistuta, they never had a dispute. Passarella declared at that time "when Batistuta finds a team that be able to play to him he will be lethal" and highlighted his professionalism.

=== Boca Juniors ===
In 1990, Batistuta joined River Plate's arch rivals, Boca Juniors. He initially found it hard to find his best form, in part not playing in his position. However, at the beginning of 1991, Óscar Tabárez became Boca Juniors' new manager and he gave Batistuta the support and put him into his best place in the field, the centre of attack, rather than as an outside forward. Batistuta finished the season as the league's top scorer as Boca Juniors won the championship.

=== Fiorentina ===
While playing for Argentina in the 1991 Copa América, the vice-president of Fiorentina was impressed by Batistuta's skills and signed him. He had a fine start in Serie A, scoring 13 goals in his debut season. However, the following season, in 1992–93, Fiorentina lost in the relegation battle and were demoted to Serie B, despite Batistuta's 16 league goals. The club returned to Serie A after one season in Serie B, with the contribution of 16 goals from Batistuta and the management of Claudio Ranieri, as Fiorentina captured the 1993–94 Serie B title.

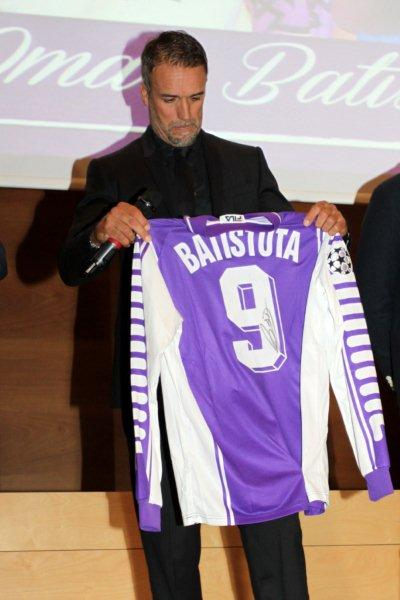
Batistuta holding his old number 9 Fiorentina jersey at a 2014 ceremony inducting him into the club's hall of fame

At Fiorentina, Batistuta found his best form. He was the top scorer of the 1994–95 Serie A season with 26 goals, and he broke Ezio Pascutti's 32-year-old record by scoring in all of the first 11 matches of the season. In the 1995–96 season, Batistuta, alongside Rui Costa and Francesco Baiano, helped the club to go on a 15-match unbeaten run, as they eventually ended the season with a fourth-place league finish. Fiorentina also won the Coppa Italia and Supercoppa Italiana over AC Milan; in the two-legged Coppa Italia final against Atalanta, Batistuta scored a goal in each fixture as Fiorentina won 3–0 on aggregate. The next season was less successful, as Fiorentina finished in a disappointing ninth place in the league, although the team managed to reach the semi-finals of the 1996–97 UEFA Cup Winners' Cup, losing out to eventual champions Barcelona, despite scoring a goal in a 1–1 away draw in the first leg. Scoring over 20 league goals in each of the next three seasons – made all the more impressive given Serie A was the strongest league in the world and the hardest to score in with the best defences – as well as spectacular powerful strikes against Arsenal and Manchester United in the UEFA Champions League, Batistuta came third for FIFA World Player of the Year in 1999. Batistuta and Ronaldo were the two best strikers in Serie A, with their duels the most anticipated in Italy.

After his failure to win the Italian championship with Fiorentina, Batistuta started considering a transfer to a bigger team. In an effort to keep Batistuta, Fiorentina hired Giovanni Trapattoni as coach and promised to do everything to win the Scudetto. After an excellent start to the season, Batistuta suffered an injury that kept him out of action for more than a month. Losing momentum, Fiorentina lost the lead and finished the season in third place, although the result enabled them to participate in the Champions League the following season.

In addition to the fans erecting a life-size bronze statue of him in Florence, Batistuta was inducted into the club's hall of fame in 2014. An emotional Batistuta told the audience at the ceremony: "From the moment I arrived at Fiorentina I wanted a place in the history of the club – and now I can say I have succeeded."

=== Roma ===
"I played the whole match with these conflicting thoughts in my head - I am sorry for Fiorentina. It was important, though, because I want to win for Roma so I was trying hard but I can not forget my past. Certainly I cannot say that I am happy to have scored against my former team-mates, but Roma wanted the win."

— Batistuta on his conflicting emotions playing for Roma against Fiorentina in November 2000.

Batistuta stayed at Fiorentina for the 1999–2000 season, tempted by the chance of winning both the Scudetto and the Champions League. After a promising start in both competitions, the team only reached seventh in the league and were eliminated in the second round group phase of the European tournament. The following season, he was transferred to Roma in a deal worth 70 billion lire (€36.2 million) and signed a three-year contract, which earned 14.8 billion Italian lire (€7.6 million) per year before tax. The fee paid for Batistuta became the highest fee ever paid for a player over the age of 30. The record was broken in 2017 when Leonardo Bonucci was signed by AC Milan on a five-year contract for a €42 million fee.

During the 2000–01 season, Batistuta finally garnered a Serie A winners' medal, scoring 20 league goals, as Roma clinched the Scudetto for the first time since 1983, including a goal in the 3–1 title-deciding victory over Parma on 17 June 2001 at the Stadio Olimpico in Rome. On 26 November 2000 Batistuta scored an 83rd-minute winner with a right-foot volley from 30 yards in a league game against Fiorentina in Rome – visibly upset having done so he refused to celebrate with his Roma teammates. Before the match he ran over to the 3,000 Fiorentina fans and saluted them, and did the same at full time, receiving adoration in return, before he left the stadium in tears. Sean Ingle, match reporter for The Guardian, wrote, "Batistuta breaks Florentine hearts, and his own." The following season with Roma, he changed his shirt number from 18 to 20 in reference to the number of goals he had scored during the Scudetto winning campaign. He also wore his age on the back of his Roma shirt in 2002, number 33.

==== Loan to Inter Milan ====
Now aged 34, Batistuta failed to find form with Roma and was loaned out to Inter Milan, scoring two goals in twelve matches, although he did provide assists for Christian Vieri. Batistuta sought a move to England to play with Fulham, but the deal never transpired.

=== Al-Arabi ===
He departed Italy for Qatar in 2003, joining Al-Arabi on a free transfer in a deal worth $8 million. Batistuta ended the season by netting 25 goals, thus surpassing the record for most goals scored, which was previously held by Qatari striker Mansour Muftah. Batistuta announced his retirement in 2005.

== International career ==
In 1991, Batistuta was selected to play for Argentina in the Copa América held in Chile, where he finished the tournament as top scorer with six goals as Argentina romped to victory. The following year, he won the FIFA Confederations Cup with Argentina, finishing as the tournament's top scorer. In 1993, Batistuta played in his second Copa América, this time held in Ecuador, which Argentina won with Batistuta scoring both goals in a 2–1 win over Mexico in the final.

The 1994 World Cup, held in the United States, was a disappointment. After a promising start Argentina were beaten by Romania in the last 16. The morale of the team was seriously affected by Diego Maradona's doping suspension. Despite the disappointing Argentine exit, Batistuta scored four goals in as many games, including a hat-trick in their opening game against Greece.

During the qualification matches for the 1998 World Cup (with former River Plate manager Daniel Passarella) Batistuta was left out of the majority of the games after falling out with the coach over team rules. The two eventually put the dispute aside and Batistuta was recalled for the tournament. In the game against Jamaica, he recorded the second hat-trick of his World Cup career, becoming the fourth player to achieve this (the others were Sándor Kocsis, Just Fontaine, and Gerd Müller) and the first to score a hat-trick in two World Cups. Argentina were knocked out of the World Cup by the Netherlands courtesy of a last-minute Dennis Bergkamp winner after the two sides had been locked at 1–1 for more than 70 minutes.

After a good series of performances by Argentina in the qualification matches for the 2002 World Cup, hopes were high that the South Americans – now managed by Marcelo Bielsa – could win the trophy, and Batistuta announced that he planned to quit the national team at the end of the tournament, which Argentina aimed to win. But Argentina's "group of death" saw the team fall at the first hurdle, only managing a victory against Nigeria (Batistuta scored the match's only goal). They later lost to England 1–0 and drew 1–1 against Sweden. This meant that the team was knocked out in the opening round for the first time since 1962 in what would be Batistuta's final international appearance. With 56 goals from 78 games, Batistuta was the record goalscorer for Argentina, a record he held until it was surpassed by Lionel Messi in 2016. Batistuta admitted he was a little annoyed at losing the record, stating, "You go around the world and people say, 'he's the top scorer for the Argentina national team', before he then added, "But the advantage I have is that I'm second to an extraterrestrial."

== Style of play ==
Batistuta, dubbed "Batigol" by his fans, is the most successful striker of his generation, having achieved mythic status at Italian club Fiorentina in the 1990s before moving to AS Roma. With his shoulder-length blond hair and soulful eyes, he looks a likely lead in Jesus Christ Superstar, but he has the instincts of a cold-blooded killer.

— Bobby Ghosh, Time (2002)

One of the most feared strikers of his generation, at his explosive peak Gabriel Batistuta was an almost unstoppable force.

The Argentinian was an exceptional finisher, capable of shooting with deadly power and accuracy off both feet. His physicality, acceleration and sharp movement made him a nightmare to defend against.

— FIFA (October 2024)

Batistuta struck shots with such controlled violence you'd think he had a vendetta against balls. And nets.

— Talksport on Gabriel Batistuta (May 2018)

Batistuta also possessed an excellent positional sense, as well as an ability to anticipate defenders in the area, score acrobatic goals from volleys or bicycle kicks, and strike the ball first time from tight angles while on the run. He was also highly regarded due to his accurate heading and powerful free-kick taking abilities; although he was a competent penalty taker, his conversion rate from the spot throughout his career was less reliable. In addition to his skill and goalscoring abilities, Batistuta frequently stood out on the pitch throughout his career due to his leadership and fair-play.

Diego Maradona stated that Batistuta is the best striker he had ever seen play the game. Batistuta's goal celebration – both arms upturned with his fists clenched – features in his statue placed next to those of Maradona and Messi in an emblematic square in the Recoleta district of Buenos Aires. Batistuta also often celebrated a goal by pretending he was firing a machine gun. Batistuta suffered several injuries throughout his career, which often limited his playing time and fitness, in particular in his later career, which would eventually force him to retire.

== Filmography ==
Year	Title	Role	Notes
1999	Muñeca brava	Himself	Episode 99; features a scene in which Batistuta is interviewed by Natalia Oreiro

== Career statistics ==
=== Club ===
Appearances and goals by club, season and competition
Club	Season	Division	League		National cup (Note: Includes Coppa Italia, Emir of Qatar Cup)		Continental		Other		Total	
Club	Season	Division	Apps	Goals	Apps	Goals	Apps	Goals	Apps	Goals	Apps	Goals
Newell's Old Boys	1988–89	Primera División	24	7	—		4	1	—		28	8
River Plate	1989–90	Primera División	21	4	—		2	0	—		23	4
Boca Juniors	1990–91	Primera División	34	13	—		12	6	—		46	19
Fiorentina	1991–92	Serie A	27	13	3	1	—		—		30	14
Fiorentina	1992–93	Serie A	32	16	3	3	—		—		35	19
Fiorentina	1993–94	Serie B	26	16	3	3	—		—		29	19
Fiorentina	1994–95	Serie A	32	26	5	2	—		—		37	28
Fiorentina	1995–96	Serie A	31	19	8	8	—		—		39	27
Fiorentina	1996–97	Serie A	32	13	1	0	7 (Note: Appearances in UEFA Cup Winners' Cup)	4	1 (Note: Appearance in Supercoppa Italiana)	2	41	19
Fiorentina	1997–98	Serie A	31	21	5	3	—		—		36	24
Fiorentina	1998–99	Serie A	28	21	9	4	4 (Note: Appearances in UEFA Cup)	1	—		41	26
Fiorentina	1999–2000	Serie A	30	23	2	0	11 (Note: Appearances in UEFA Champions League)	6	—		43	29
Fiorentina	Total		269	168	39	24	22	10	1	2	331	204
Roma	2000–01	Serie A	28	20	0	0	4	1	—		32	21
Roma	2001–02	Serie A	23	6	0	0	11	0	1	0	35	6
Roma	2002–03	Serie A	12	4	2	1	6	1	—		20	6
Roma	Total		63	30	2	1	21	2	1	0	87	33
Inter Milan (loan)	2002–03	Serie A	12	2	—		—		—		12	2
Al-Arabi	2003–04	Qatar Stars League	18	25	2	1	—		—		20	26
Al-Arabi	2004–05	Qatar Stars League	3	0	1	1	—		—		4	1
Al-Arabi	Total		21	25	3	2	—		—		24	29
Career total			444	248	44	27	61	20	2	2	551	299

=== International ===
Appearances and goals by national team and year
National team	Year	Apps	Goals
Argentina	1991	7	6
Argentina	1992	5	6
Argentina	1993	15	6
Argentina	1994	10	6
Argentina	1995	11	9
Argentina	1996	5	3
Argentina	1997	2	0
Argentina	1998	12	12
Argentina	1999	2	2
Argentina	2000	5	4
Argentina	2001	1	1
Argentina	2002	3	1
Total		78	56

== Honours ==
Newell's Old Boys

- Copa Libertadores runner-up: 1988

River Plate

- Argentine Primera División: 1989–90

Fiorentina

- Coppa Italia: 1995–96
- Supercoppa Italiana: 1996
- Serie B: 1993–94

Roma

- Serie A: 2000–01
- Supercoppa Italiana: 2001

Argentina

- Copa América: 1991, 1993
- FIFA Confederations Cup: 1992
- CONMEBOL–UEFA Cup of Champions: 1993

Individual

- Copa América Golden Boot: 1991, 1995
- FIFA Confederations Cup top scorer: 1992
- Serie A top scorer: 1994–95
- Coppa Italia top scorer: 1995–96
- FIFA World Cup Silver Shoe: 1998
- Argentine Player of the Year: 1998
- ESM Team of the Year: 1998–1999
- Serie A Foreign Footballer of the Year: 1999
- FIFA World Player of the Year bronze award: 1999
- Ballon d'Or: 1998 (6th place), 1999 (4th place), 2000 (7th place)
- FIFA 100
- Qatari League top scorer: 2003–04
- Italian Football Hall of Fame: 2013
- ACF Fiorentina Hall of Fame: 2014
- AS Roma Hall of Fame: 2015
- AFA Team of All Time (published 2015)
- Fiorentina All-time XI
- Fiorentina All-time top scorer in Serie A
- GCC Golden Boot: 2003–04
- IFFHS Argentina All Times Dream Team: 2021

== See also ==
- List of men's footballers with 50 or more international goals
