= 1996 Supercoppa Italiana =

- Event: Supercoppa Italiana
AC Milan	Fiorentina
Serie A	Coppa Italia
1	2
- Date: 25 August 1996
- Venue: San Siro, Milan
- Referee: Fiorenzo Treossi
- Attendance: 29,582

The 1996 Supercoppa Italiana was a match played by the 1995–96 Serie A winners AC Milan and 1995–96 Coppa Italia winners Fiorentina. It took place on 25 August 1996 at the San Siro in Milan, Italy. Fiorentina won the match 2–1 to earn their first and to date only Supercoppa.

== Match details ==
25 August 1996
20:30 CET

AC Milan	1–2	Fiorentina
Savićević 22'	Report	12', 83' Batistuta

San Siro, Milan
Attendance: 29,582
Referee: Fiorenzo Treossi

AC Milan	Fiorentina

MILAN:
GK	1	(Italy) Sebastiano Rossi
RB	14	(Netherlands) Michael Reiziger
CB	6	(Italy) Franco Baresi (c)
CB	11	(Italy) Alessandro Costacurta
LB	3	(Italy) Paolo Maldini
RM	10	(Federal Republic of Yugoslavia) Dejan Savićević	(substituted off) 67'
CM	4	(Italy) Demetrio Albertini	(substituted off) 76'
CM	8	(Ghana) Marcel Desailly
LM	20	(Croatia) Zvonimir Boban
RF	9	(Liberia) George Weah
LF	23	(Italy) Marco Simone
Substitutes:
CB	5	(Italy) Filippo Galli
CM	15	(Italy) Massimo Ambrosini
RM	16	(Italy) Tomas Locatelli
RB	21	(Italy) Mauro Tassotti
LM	22	(Netherlands) Edgar Davids	(substituted on) 67'
RM	24	(Italy) Stefano Eranio	(substituted on) 76'
GK	25	(Italy) Angelo Pagotto
Manager:
(Uruguay) Oscar Washington Tabárez

FIORENTINA:
GK	1	(Italy) Francesco Toldo
RB	2	(Italy) Daniele Carnasciali
CB	6	(Italy) Aldo Firicano
CB	5	(Italy) Lorenzo Amoruso
LB	16	(Italy) Giulio Falcone
DM	7	(Sweden) Stefan Schwarz
CM	4	(Italy) Giovanni Piacentini
CM	14	(Italy) Sandro Cois	(substituted off) 90'
AM	10	(Portugal) Rui Costa	(substituted off) 81'
RF	9	(Argentina) Gabriel Batistuta (c)
LF	11	(Brazil) Luís Oliveira	(substituted off) 87'
Substitutes:
GK	22	(Italy) Gianmatteo Mareggini
DF	17	(Italy) Vittorio Pusceddu	(substituted on) 90'
DF	21	(Italy) Marco Vendrame
MF	13	(Italy) Danilo Stefani
MF	15	(Italy) Roberto Mirri
MF	20	(Italy) Emiliano Bigica	(substituted on) 87'
FW	23	(Italy) Anselmo Robbiati	(substituted on) 81'
Manager:
(Italy) Claudio Ranieri

MATCH OFFICIALS

- Assistant referees:
- Fourth official:

MATCH RULES

- 90 minutes.
- 30 minutes of extra-time if necessary.
- Penalty shoot-out if scores still level.
- Seven named substitutes
- Maximum of 3 substitutions.

== See also ==
- 1996–97 AC Milan season
- 1996–97 AC Fiorentina season
