= Alessandro Atzeni =

Italian footballer (born 1980)

Alessandro Atzeni (born 1 January 1980 in Florence) is a retired Italian footballer. He played as a striker. After playing in Fiorentina youth teams, he made his debut in Serie A in 1998. After that, he played in Serie B with Genoa and in lower series with Montevarchi, Pisa and Castel di Sangro.

== Career ==
1997–1998 Fiorentina 2 (0)
1998–1999 Southampton 0 (0)
1999–2001 Genoa 6 (1)
2001 Montevarchi 12 (6)
2001–2002 Pisa 5 (0)
2002–2003 Castel di Sangro 8 (1)
2003–2004 Nuova Chiusi 3 (0)
2004–2005 Poggibonsi 9 (3)
