= Rui Costa =

Portuguese footballer (born 1972)

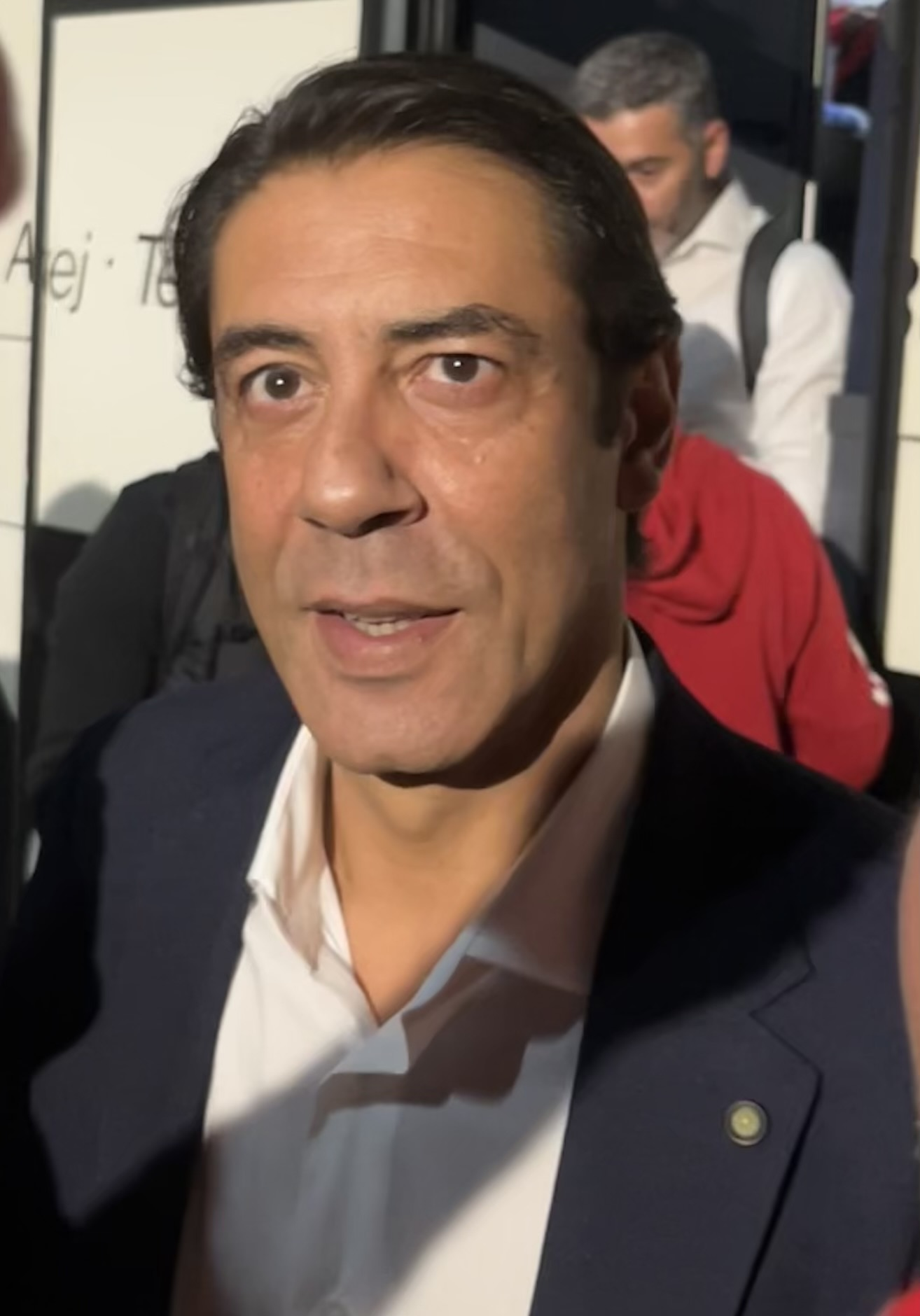
- Costa in 2026

34th President of Benfica
- Incumbent
- Assumed office 10 October 2021
- Preceded by: Luís Filipe Vieira

Personal details
- Born: Rui Manuel César Costa; 29 March 1972 (age 54) Amadora, Portugal
- Height: 1.80 m (5 ft 11 in)
- Occupation: Footballer
Association football career
- Position: Attacking midfielder
Youth career
- 1977–1990: Benfica
Senior career*
Years	Team	Apps	(Gls)
1990–1994	Benfica	78	(13)
1990–1991	→ Fafe (loan)	38	(6)
1994–2001	Fiorentina	215	(38)
2001–2006	AC Milan	124	(4)
2006–2008	Benfica	43	(5)
Total		498	(66)
International career
1990	Portugal U18	4	(1)
1991	Portugal U20	11	(1)
1992–1994	Portugal U21	19	(7)
1993–2004	Portugal	94	(26)
Medal record
Men's football
Representing Portugal
UEFA European Championship
Runner-up	2004 Portugal
Bronze medal – third place	2000 Belgium-Netherlands
FIFA U-20 World Cup
Winner	1991 Portugal
UEFA European Under-21 Championship
Runner-up	1994 France
UEFA European Under-18 Championship
Runner-up	1990 Hungary
- * Club domestic league appearances and goals

Rui Manuel César Costa OIH (Portuguese pronunciation: [ʁuj ˈkɔʃtɐ]; born 29 March 1972) is a Portuguese former professional footballer who is the 34th president of sports club Benfica.

Costa spent the majority of his football career with Benfica in Portugal and Fiorentina and AC Milan in Italy. In a top-flight career spanning 17 years, he won several trophies, including one Primeira Liga title, one Taça de Portugal, one Serie A title, three Coppa Italia, one UEFA Champions League and one UEFA Super Cup. A Portuguese international, he amassed 94 caps and scored 26 goals for A Seleção and represented the country in three UEFA European Championships and one FIFA World Cup.

Costa usually played as an attacking midfielder and was particularly known for his excellent technique, playmaking ability, and eye for goal from midfield. He was regarded as one of the best midfielders in world football in his prime and one of Portugal's best players of all time. In 2004, he was named by Pelé in the FIFA 100 as one of the 125 greatest living football players.

== Club career ==
=== Benfica ===
At age five, Costa joined the infant indoor football team of Damaia Ginásio Clube. Costa tried his luck at Benfica. Within ten minutes of training, Portugal legend Eusébio, who was supervising the youngsters, was impressed with Costa's skills. Up until 1990, Costa played for Benfica's youth squads. In his first full season, he was loaned to Fafe on a season-long deal.

In 1991, after the Under-21 World Cup, which Portugal won after a penalty kick scored by Costa, he returned to Benfica. In his first full season with Benfica, he was featured regularly in Benfica's team. In his next two seasons, his role in the team would prove to be pivotal as Benfica captured two trophies. He formed a formidable midfield partnership with João Vieira Pinto. During his last two seasons with Benfica in his first spell with the club, he won the Taça de Portugal in 1993 and the Portuguese First Division title in 1993–94. This would be Benfica's last league title for the next ten seasons.

=== Fiorentina ===
At the end of his third season in Benfica's senior squad, Fiorentina offered 1,200 million escudos (approximately €6 million) for the 21-year-old midfielder.

His departure from Fiorentina was discussed every season, since many clubs constantly showed interest in signing him. However, he only left Fiorentina one season before their bankruptcy in the 2001–02 season. With the Florentine club, Costa won the Coppa Italia twice, also winning a Supercoppa Italiana. In June 2001, Fiorentina agreed to sell both Costa and Francesco Toldo to Parma for 140 billion lire. Despite both players' refusal to join, Costa and Toldo were sold to AC Milan and Inter Milan, respectively, for the same total transfer fee.

=== AC Milan ===
Fatih Terim was the coach of Fiorentina in the 2000–01 season. When he was leaving Fiorentina for AC Milan, he took Costa with him, paying 85 billion lire (€43,898,836) for the player. In so doing, Costa became Milan's most expensive transfer of all time.

On 27 September 2001, Costa scored his first goal for Milan to open a 4–0 home win (6–0 aggregate) in the first round of the UEFA Cup against BATE Borisov. He added further goals in wins over CSKA Sofia (second round) and Hapoel Tel Aviv (quarter-finals) in a run to the last four. He was hampered by injuries throughout the whole season, including a wrist injury on his debut, while his form was inconsistent. Playing away at Fiorentina, he greeted his former club's fans in tears, which led to an angry reaction when he returned to Milan.

Ahead of his second season at Milan, Costa faced competition from Brazilian new signing Rivaldo, but secured a starting place against him. On 24 September 2002, he assisted three goals in a 4–0 Champions League group win at Deportivo de La Coruña, leading a television commentator to call him three times better than Zinedine Zidane. He scored his first domestic goal on 18 December, equalising in a 5–1 win (6–2 aggregate) against Ancona at the San Siro in the second leg of the last 16 of the Coppa Italia. In the 6–3 aggregate final win over Roma in May, he played only 30 minutes as a substitute as Brazilians Rivaldo and Serginho were preferred in attacking midfield. This was to rest him for the 2003 UEFA Champions League final against Juventus, in which he was substituted injured for Massimo Ambrosini near the end of regulation time in a goalless draw that the Rossoneri won on penalties at Old Trafford. On 29 August, he played in the 1–0 victory over Porto in the 2003 UEFA Super Cup, in which he crossed for the only goal by Andriy Shevchenko.

From 2003–04, Costa's playing time was limited by the emergent Brazilian youngster Kaká. He contributed his first three league goals to Milan's title-winning campaign, starting with one in a 5–0 home win over Ancona on 25 January.

=== Return to Benfica ===
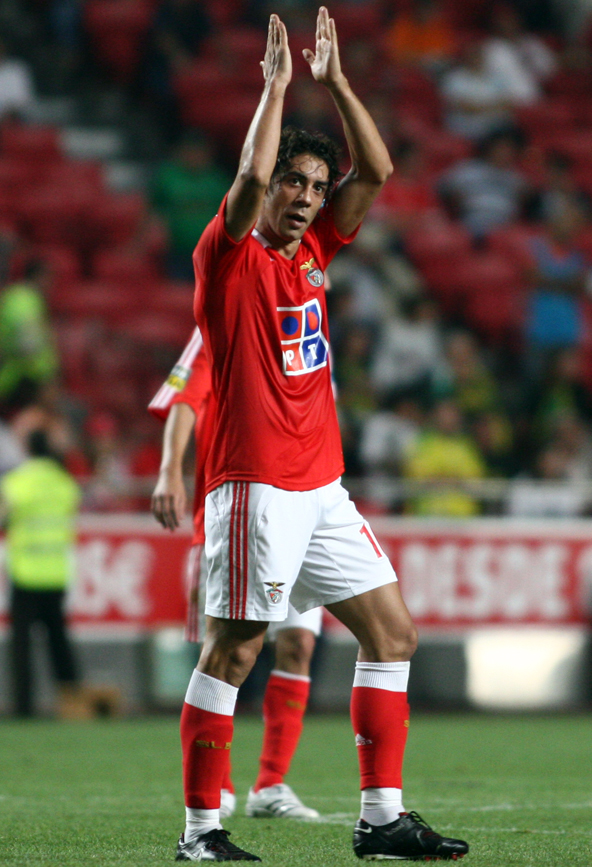
Costa with Benfica in 2007

On 25 May 2006, Costa's return to Benfica in the upcoming season was announced in a press conference. He had been released from Milan, after both the player and the club reached an agreement to end his €4.6 million per year contract, in order to fulfill his long-held dream of returning to Benfica. Costa started on his return in a 2006–07 UEFA Champions League qualifier against Austria Wien in August 2006, and the second leg saw Costa score in his home return. Despite Costa being used as a regular under manager Fernando Santos when available, the season was impaired with injuries: he suffered a muscle tear in October, which kept him out of action for three months, and another muscular injury in February.

Prior to the end of the season, Costa announced the following one would be his last as a professional. After assuring the qualification to the Champions League group stage, which included a brace from Costa against Copenhagen, Benfica was drawn against Costa's former club Milan.; he returned to play one last time at the San Siro on 18 September 2007. Costa remained a first-team choice under José Antonio Camacho and Fernando Chalana, and his displays would earn him the SJPF Player of the Month award for September 2007 and Benfica's Player of the Year award for 2007. Costa played his final match on 11 May 2008 at the Estádio da Luz against Vitória de Setúbal. He was substituted in the 86th minute to a standing ovation from the spectators. The season, as well as the previous one, ended trophyless.

== International career ==
=== Youth and Euro 96 ===
Costa was part of the Portugal national under-20 team under manager Carlos Queiroz, who won the 1991 FIFA World Youth Championship on home soil. After a goalless draw with Brazil in the final at his club ground of the Estádio da Luz, he scored the winning penalty in the final.

On 31 March 1993, Costa made his debut for the senior national team in a 1–1 draw away to Switzerland, in 1994 FIFA World Cup qualification. In his third game on 19 June in another qualifier at home to Malta, he scored his first goal in a 4–0 win. He was part of the squad at UEFA Euro 1996 in England, where they were eliminated in the quarter-finals by runners-up the Czech Republic.

=== Euro 2000 ===
Costa was sent off for the only time in his entire career on 6 September 1997, in a 1998 FIFA World Cup qualifier away to Germany. While being substituted, he was shown a red card by referee Marc Batta for leaving the pitch too slowly, meaning that Portugal could not bring Sérgio Conceição on as a replacement. Minutes after the dismissal, the Germans equalised through Ulf Kirsten, meaning that they and not the Portuguese would go to the final tournament in France. Costa said on the 20th anniversary of the controversy that he would only forgive Batta if he apologised to the Portuguese nation.

In UEFA Euro 2000 qualification, Costa scored six times in home and away victories over Liechtenstein (two each) and Hungary. At the finals in Belgium and the Netherlands, he assisted the last two goals by João Pinto and Nuno Gomes in a 3–2 comeback win over England in a run to the semi-finals.

=== 2002 World Cup and Euro 2004 ===
Portugal was eliminated at the group stage in the 2002 FIFA World Cup in Japan and South Korea. Costa was dropped for Pinto after a shock 3–2 opening loss to the United States, but came on as a substitute in the next game and finished Capucho's cross to conclude a 4–0 win over Poland.

Before UEFA Euro 2004 on home soil, Costa and Luís Figo criticised the decision of manager Luiz Felipe Scolari to select his Brazilian compatriot Deco – a player in Costa's same position. After being substituted at half time in another shock opening loss, this time to Greece, Costa was dropped for Deco in the next match against Russia. He came off the bench in that game and finished a Cristiano Ronaldo cross to secure a 2–0 victory. In the quarter-finals against England, again as a substitute, he scored a long-range goal in extra time as the game finished 2–2 and went to penalties; he missed in the shootout but his team prevailed.

Costa retired from international football after the unexpected defeat to the Greeks again in the Euro 2004 final. He scored 26 goals in 94 appearances, making him the eleventh-most capped player and the eighth-highest goalscorer.

== Style of play ==
Costa is considered by pundits to have been one of the greatest midfielders of his generation, as well as one of Portugal's best players ever, and was regarded as one of the best playmakers in the world in his prime. A classic number 10, he usually played in a creative role as an attacking midfielder behind the strikers, but was also capable of playing in midfield as a deep-lying playmaker, as a second striker, or as a winger. A quick, technically gifted and elegant player, throughout his career, he was renowned for his excellent dribbling skills, vision, and precise passing, which made him an effective assist provider, and enabled him to create space for his teammates, or orchestrate his teams' attacking moves. Although he was mainly known to be a creative team player, he also possessed an eye for goal from midfield, and was an accurate striker of the ball with either foot, in particular from outside the area. He was also an accurate free kick and penalty taker. Despite his technical abilities, he faced occasional criticism from pundits for inconsistent performances throughout his career.

== Media ==
Costa was sponsored by American sportswear company Nike and appeared in Nike commercials. In 1996, he starred in a Nike commercial titled "Good vs Evil" in a gladiatorial game set in a Roman amphitheatre. Appearing alongside football players from around the world, including Ronaldo, Paolo Maldini, Eric Cantona, Luís Figo and Patrick Kluivert, they defend "The Beautiful Game" against a team of demonic warriors, before it culminates with Cantona striking the ball and destroying evil. Rui Costa features in EA Sports' FIFA football video game series; he was included in the Ultimate Team Legends in FIFA 16.

== Post-playing career ==
=== Sporting director ===
The day after his last professional match, Costa was presented as director of football at Benfica. During the summer 2008 transfer window, Costa brought head coach Quique Sánchez Flores, playmaker Pablo Aimar, winger José Antonio Reyes, and striker David Suazo, the latter two on loan. The following Summer, Costa tried to strengthen the team after a disappointing league campaign the previous season; he signed striker Javier Saviola, attacking midfielder Ramires, and defensive midfielder Javi García, led by manager Jorge Jesus. Benfica would win the 2009–10 Primeira Liga, the first league title since 2004–05, and the Taça da Liga that season, defeating Porto in the final.

=== Administration ===
On 14 May 2008, Costa was appointed an administrator of Benfica SAD. For the 2020–24 quadrennial, he became a vice-president of the club's board of directors, as part of Luís Filipe Vieira's list for a sixth consecutive mandate. After acting as interim president of the club and its SAD from 9 July 2021, in the aftermath of Vieira suspending his presidency due to arrest in operation Cartão Vermelho (Red Card), Costa was elected the 34th president of Benfica on 9 October, assuming office the following day. With 84.48% of the votes, he defeated candidate Francisco Benitez, who received 12.24%.

During election campaign, Costa had pledged, among other promises, a forensic audit of the club's SAD (released in June 2024), a revision of the club's statutes (the board's first proposal, criticised by the Commission for Revision of the Statutes, was made available on 14 July 2023, and a final one was voted and approved on 8 March 2025), transparency regarding football transfers, retention of players "made in Seixal", a reduction of the number of players, a maximum wage for players, and improvements to Estádio da Luz.

Including his interim role, the men's football team was trophyless under his first year of presidency. Back in January 2022, Costa had said that his signature on player contracts under investigation by authorities in Cartão Vermelho did not imply he was in collusion with anyone. During the 2022–23 winter transfer window, Costa promised not to release central midfielder Enzo Fernández unless a club paid the player's buyout clause, but Fernández left Benfica via negotiation on 31 January 2023, with Benfica paying to "intermediary services" for the transfer. After signing with Roger Schmidt, Benfica's first non-Portuguese manager since Flores, the club won the 2022–23 Primeira Liga, ending a four-year trophy wait. Benfica started the next season by winning the Portuguese Super Cup, but failed to win any other trophy, despite an investment of €100 million.

== Personal life ==
Costa was married to Rute from 1994 to 2013 and fathered two sons. The elder, Filipe, is CEO of Footlab, a football agency, while the younger, Hugo, is a footballer.

== Career statistics ==
=== Club ===
Appearances and goals by club, season and competition
Club	Season	League			National cup (Note: Includes Taça de Portugal, Coppa Italia)		Europe		Other		Total	
Club	Season	Division	Apps	Goals	Apps	Goals	Apps	Goals	Apps	Goals	Apps	Goals
Fafe (loan)	1990–91	Segunda Divisão	38	6	0	0	—		—		38	6
Benfica	1991–92	Primeira Liga	21	4	3	0	7 (Note: Appearances in European Cup)	0	1 (Note: Appearance(s) in Supertaça Cândido de Oliveira)	0	32	4
Benfica	1992–93	Primeira Liga	23	4	4	1	4 (Note: Appearance(s) in UEFA Cup)	0	1	0	32	5
Benfica	1993–94	Primeira Liga	34	5	3	1	8 (Note: Appearances in UEFA Cup Winners' Cup)	4	2	0	47	10
Benfica	Total		78	13	10	2	19	4	4	0	111	19
Fiorentina	1994–95	Serie A	31	9	4	0	—		—		35	9
Fiorentina	1995–96	Serie A	34	4	7	2	—		—		41	6
Fiorentina	1996–97	Serie A	28	2	1	0	8	0	1 (Note: Appearance in Supercoppa Italiana)	0	38	2
Fiorentina	1997–98	Serie A	32	3	5	2	—		—		37	5
Fiorentina	1998–99	Serie A	31	10	7	4	1	0	—		39	14
Fiorentina	1999–2000	Serie A	30	4	4	0	14 (Note: Appearances in UEFA Champions League)	2	—		48	6
Fiorentina	2000–01	Serie A	29	6	7	2	2	0	—		38	8
Fiorentina	Total		215	38	35	10	25	2	1	0	276	50
AC Milan	2001–02	Serie A	22	0	1	0	10	3	—		33	3
AC Milan	2002–03	Serie A	25	0	5	1	18	0	—		48	1
AC Milan	2003–04	Serie A	28	3	4	0	6	0	3 (Note: One appearance in Supercoppa Italiana, one appearance in UEFA Super Cup, one appearance in Intercontinental Cup)	0	41	3
AC Milan	2004–05	Serie A	24	1	4	0	9	0	1	0	38	1
AC Milan	2005–06	Serie A	25	0	3	3	4	0	—		32	3
AC Milan	Total		124	4	17	4	47	3	4	0	192	11
Benfica	2006–07	Primeira Liga	14	0	3	0	5 (Note: Two appearances and one goal in UEFA Champions League, three appearances in UEFA Cup)	1	—		22	1
Benfica	2007–08	Primeira Liga	29	5	4	3	12	2	0	0	45	10
Benfica	Total		43	5	7	3	17	3	0	0	67	11
Career total			498	66	69	19	108	12	9	0	684	97

=== International ===
Appearances and goals by national team and year
National team	Year	Apps	Goals
Portugal	1993	7	2
Portugal	1994	5	1
Portugal	1995	7	3
Portugal	1996	11	2
Portugal	1997	4	0
Portugal	1998	5	3
Portugal	1999	9	6
Portugal	2000	13	3
Portugal	2001	6	0
Portugal	2002	7	2
Portugal	2003	11	1
Portugal	2004	9	3
Total		94	26

Scores and results list Portugal's goal tally first, score column indicates score after each Costa goal.

List of international goals scored by Rui Costa
No.	Date	Venue	Opponent	Score	Result	Competition
1	19 June 1993	Estádio do Bessa, Porto, Portugal	Malta	2–0	4–0	1994 FIFA World Cup qualification
2	5 September 1993	Kadriorg Stadium, Tallinn, Estonia	Estonia	1–0	2–0	1994 FIFA World Cup qualification
3	7 September 1994	Windsor Park, Belfast, Northern Ireland	Northern Ireland	1–0	2–1	UEFA Euro 1996 qualifying
4	15 August 1995	Sportpark Eschen-Mauren, Eschen, Liechtenstein	Liechtenstein	3–0	7–0	UEFA Euro 1996 qualifying
5	15 August 1995	Sportpark Eschen-Mauren, Eschen, Liechtenstein	Liechtenstein	6–0	7–0	UEFA Euro 1996 qualifying
6	15 September 1995	Estádio da Luz, Lisbon, Portugal	Republic of Ireland	1–0	3–0	UEFA Euro 1996 qualifying
7	24 January 1996	Parc des Princes, Paris, France	France	2–1	2–3	Friendly
8	9 October 1996	Qemal Stafa Stadium, Tirana, Albania	Albania	3–0	3–0	1998 FIFA World Cup qualification
9	19 August 1998	Estádio de São Miguel, Ponta Delgada, Portugal	Mozambique	1–0	2–1	Friendly
10	19 August 1998	Estádio de São Miguel, Ponta Delgada, Portugal	Mozambique	2–0	2–1	Friendly
11	6 September 1998	Ferenc Puskás Stadium, Budapest, Hungary	Hungary	3–1	3–1	UEFA Euro 2000 qualifying
12	31 March 1999	Sportpark Eschen-Mauren, Eschen, Liechtenstein	Liechtenstein	1–0	5–0	UEFA Euro 2000 qualifying
13	31 March 1999	Sportpark Eschen-Mauren, Eschen, Liechtenstein	Liechtenstein	5–0	5–0	UEFA Euro 2000 qualifying
14	9 June 1999	Estádio Cidade de Coimbra, Coimbra, Portugal	Liechtenstein	7–0	8–0	UEFA Euro 2000 qualifying
15	9 June 1999	Estádio Cidade de Coimbra, Coimbra, Portugal	Liechtenstein	8–0	8–0	UEFA Euro 2000 qualifying
16	18 August 1999	Estádio Nacional, Lisbon, Portugal	Andorra	1–0	4–0	Friendly
17	9 October 1999	Estádio da Luz, Lisbon, Portugal	Hungary	1–0	3–0	UEFA Euro 2000 qualifying
18	29 March 2000	Estádio Dr. Magalhães Pessoa, Leiria, Portugal	Denmark	1–1	2–1	Friendly
19	16 August 2000	Estádio do Fontelo, Viseu, Portugal	Lithuania	3–1	5–1	Friendly
20	3 September 2000	Kadrioru Stadium, Tallinn, Estonia	Estonia	1–0	3–1	2002 FIFA World Cup qualification
21	10 June 2002	Jeonju World Cup Stadium, Jeonju, South Korea	Poland	4–0	4–0	2002 FIFA World Cup
22	16 October 2002	Ullevi, Gothenburg, Sweden	Sweden	3–2	3–2	Friendly
23	11 October 2003	Estádio do Restelo, Lisbon, Portugal	Albania	3–2	5–3	Friendly
24	29 May 2004	Estádio Municipal de Águeda, Águeda, Portugal	Luxembourg	3–0	3–0	Friendly
25	16 June 2004	Estádio da Luz, Lisbon, Portugal	Russia	2–0	2–0	UEFA Euro 2004
26	24 June 2004	Estádio da Luz, Lisbon, Portugal	England	2–1	2–2 (a.e.t.) (6–5 p)	UEFA Euro 2004

== Honours ==
Benfica

- Primeira Liga: 1993–94
- Taça de Portugal: 1992–93
- Supertaça Cândido de Oliveira runner-up: 1991, 1993

Fiorentina

- Coppa Italia: 1995–96, 2000–01
- Supercoppa Italiana: 1996

AC Milan

- Serie A: 2003–04
- Coppa Italia: 2002–03
- Supercoppa Italiana: 2004
- UEFA Champions League: 2002–03; runner-up: 2004–05
- UEFA Super Cup: 2003
- Intercontinental Cup runner-up: 2003

Portugal U20

- FIFA World Youth Championship: 1991
- Toulon Tournament: 1992

Portugal

- UEFA European Championship runner-up: 2004

Individual

- Toulon Tournament Best Player: 1992
- Toulon Tournament top goalscorer: 1992
- UEFA European Championship Team of the Tournament: 1996, 2000
- World XI: 1998
- UEFA Champions League top assist provider: 2002–03
- FIFA 100
- FIFA World Player of the Year: 2001 (12th place)
- Ballon d'Or: 1996 (26th place), 2000 (24th place), 2001 (25th place)
- SJPF Player of the Month: September 2007
- Cosme Damião Awards – Footballer of the Year: 2007
- Eurochampion Prize Serie A Foreign Footballer of the Year - 2000-01
- AC Milan Hall of Fame
- Fiorentina All-time XI
- IFFHS Portugal All-time XI
- Globe Soccer Awards Portugal Best Ever XI
- AFS Top-100 Players of All Time #85: 2007
- The Guardian Serie A Best Team of the 90s
- Serie A Team of the Season 1994–95, 1998-99, 2000-01
- Golden Foot Award: 2024, as football legend

Orders

- Officer of the Order of Prince Henry

Preceded by Luís Filipe Vieira	President of Benfica; 2021–present	Succeeded by Incumbent
