= Emiliano Bigica =

Italian footballer (born 1973)

Personal information
- Full name: Emiliano Francesco Bigica
- Date of birth: 4 September 1973 (age 53)
- Place of birth: Bari, Italy
- Height: 1.77 m (5 ft 10 in)
- Position: Midfielder

Team information
- Current team: Sassuolo U19 (head coach)

Youth career
- –1981: Bari

Senior career*
Years	Team	Apps	(Gls)
1991–1992	Empoli	7	(0)
1992–1993	Potenza	27	(0)
1993–1995	Bari	60	(2)
1995–2001	Fiorentina	60	(0)
2001	Napoli	2	(0)
2001–2002	Salernitana	11	(0)
2002–2003	Napoli	11	(0)
2003	Nocerina	14	(0)
2003–2004	Mantova	10	(0)
2004–2005	Potenza	16	(0)
2005–2007	Novara	22	(0)

International career
1994	Italy U21	1	(0)

Managerial career
- 2007–2009: Novara U17
- 2009–2010: Vigevano
- 2011–2012: Verbania
- 2012–2013: Sporting Bellinzago
- 2014–2016: Empoli U17
- 2016–2017: Italy U17
- 2017–2020: Fiorentina U19
- 2020–: Sassuolo U19
- 2024: Sassuolo (caretaker)
- * Club domestic league appearances and goals

Emiliano Bigica (born 4 September 1973) is an Italian former professional footballer who played as a midfielder.

== Playing career ==
After playing at youth level for Bari, Bigica started his professional career in 1991 for Empoli. He successively went on to have a career in the major leagues of Italian football, making his Serie A debut in 1994 with Bari and then joining Fiorentina in 1995, with whom he spent four seasons and won a Coppa Italia and an Italian Supercup. He retired in 2007.

== Coaching career ==
After retiring, Bigica went on to a coaching career which started in 2007 as part of the youth system of Novara. After a few seasons at the amateur level of Piedmont, in 2014 he returned to work at the youth level with Empoli, successively working in charge of the Italy U17 and then Fiorentina U19 and Sassuolo U19.

On 25 February 2024, Bigica was temporarily promoted as head coach in charge of the first team of Sassuolo, following the dismissal of Alessio Dionisi.

== Honours ==
Fiorentina

- Coppa Italia: 1995–96
- Supercoppa Italiana: 1996
