= Danilo Stefani =

Italian footballer (born 1979)

Personal information
- Date of birth: 19 January 1979 (age 47)
- Place of birth: Macerata, Italy
- Height: 1.78 m (5 ft 10 in)
- Position: Midfielder

Senior career*
Years	Team	Apps	(Gls)
1995–1996	Maceratese	31	(3)
1996–1999	Fiorentina	2	(0)
1999–2000	Turris	27	(1)
2000–2003	Acireale	51	(2)
2003–2005	Fano	86	(1)
2005–2006	Chieti	28	(0)
2006–2007	Poggibonsi	21	(0)
2007–2008	Casale	22	(1)
2008–2009	Tolentino	25	(0)
2009–2010	Maceratese	15	(2)
2010–2011	Flaminia Civita Castellana	16	(2)
2011	Montegranaro	5	(0)
2011–2012	Voluntas Spoleto	14	(0)
2012–2014	Vis Macerata		
2014–2015	Helvia Recina		
- * Club domestic league appearances and goals

Danilo Stefani (born 19 January 1979) is an Italian former footballer who played as a midfielder. After playing two matches with A.C. Fiorentina in Serie A he continued his career with various teams in Serie C2 and from 2007 played in Serie D, Eccellenza and Promozione, the divisions of amateur (and semi-pro) Lega Nazionale Dilettanti of Italy.

== Honours ==
Fiorentina

- Supercoppa Italiana: 1996
