= Roberto Mirri =

Italian footballer

Personal information
- Full name: Roberto Mirri
- Date of birth: 21 August 1978 (age 48)
- Place of birth: Imola, Italy
- Height: 1.86 m (6 ft 1 in)
- Position: Central defender

Youth career
- 1995–1997: Fiorentina

Senior career*
| Years | Team | Apps | (Gls) |
| 1997–1999 | Fiorentina | 5 | (0) |
| 1999–2003 | Empoli | 29 | (1) |
| 2003 | → Catania (loan) | 2 | (0) |
| 2004–2009 | Mons | 129 | (2) |
| 2009–2011 | Südtirol | 23 | (0) |
| 2011–2012 | Venezia | 25 | (0) |
| 2012–2013 | Matera | 5 | (1) |

International career
| 1998–1999 | Italy U-21 | 2 | (0) |
- * Club domestic league appearances and goals as of January 2013

Roberto Mirri (born 21 August 1978 in Imola) is an Italian former footballer who played as a defender.

== Football career ==
Mirri started his professional career at AC Fiorentina, and was later sold to Empoli, at both clubs playing in Serie A. He also had a stint on loan at Catania in 2003. In the summer of 2004, Mirri was sold to Mons in Belgium.

== Honours ==
Fiorentina

- Supercoppa Italiana: 1996
