= Luís Oliveira =

Belgian footballer and manager (born 1969)

- Oliveira with Fiorentina in 1997

Personal information
- Full name: Luís Airton Barroso de Oliveira
- Date of birth: 24 March 1969 (age 57)
- Place of birth: São Luís, Maranhão, Brazil
- Height: 1.76 m (5 ft 9 in)
- Position: Striker

Team information
- Current team: Venezia Women (head coach)

Youth career
- 1984: Tupan
- 1985–1988: Anderlecht

Senior career*
Years	Team	Apps	(Gls)
1988–1992	Anderlecht	95	(36)
1992–1996	Cagliari	121	(42)
1996–1999	Fiorentina	95	(27)
1999–2000	Cagliari	24	(4)
2000–2001	Bologna	17	(1)
2001–2002	Como	38	(23)
2002–2004	Catania	74	(28)
2004–2005	Foggia	14	(0)
2005	Venezia	17	(5)
2005–2006	Lucchese	19	(3)
2006–2008	Nuorese	63	(25)
2008–2009	Derthona	32	(16)
2009–2011	Muravera	12	(14)
Total		621	(224)

International career
1992–1999	Belgium	31	(7)

Managerial career
- 2010: Muravera (player/manager)
- 2012–2013: Muravera
- 2014–2014: Pro Patria
- 2015–2016: Floriana
- 2017–2018: Muravera
- 2018: Floriana
- 2025: Riccione Women
- 2025–: Venezia Women
- * Club domestic league appearances and goals

Luís Airton Barroso "Lulù" de Oliveira (born 24 March 1969) is a football manager, currently in charge of Venezia Women, and former player. A striker, he spent most of his playing career in Italy. Born in Brazil, Oliveira was an international footballer for Belgium.

== Playing career ==
=== Club ===
Born in 1969 in a favela in São Luís, Maranhão, Brazil, he was signed by Belgian club Anderlecht, where he started his career and played until 1992.

He moved to Italy in 1992, where he played for Cagliari, Fiorentina, Bologna, Como, Catania, Foggia, Venezia and Lucchese, becoming known in his early years at Cagliari and Fiorentina as a Serie A striker.

In 2006, he accepted to play Nuorese of Serie C2/A, also in order to get closer to his family (his wife in Sardinia). In 2008, following the disbandment of his club, he agreed for a move to Serie D team Derthona.

In July 2009, Oliveira moved back to Sardinia, joining Eccellenza club Muravera, a club from his wife's hometown. He retired in 2010 at the age of 41.

=== International ===
A naturalized Belgian citizen, he earned 31 caps for Belgium and played for his adoptive country at the 1998 FIFA World Cup.

== Coaching career ==
During his final season as a footballer, Oliveira also served as player/manager for the last few months of the 2009–10 season, and then stated his interest in a coaching career in the next future.

He successfully passed the category 2 (UEFA A) coaching exam in June 2011 in Italy. In March 2012 he returned to Muravera, this time as head coach for the remaining four games of the season. He was confirmed as Muravera coach also for the 2012–13 season, in which he led his small club to triumph in the Coppa Italia Eccellenza.

On 1 August 2014, it was announced Oliveira would become the new head coach of Lega Pro club Pro Patria with immediate effect, but he was dismissed on 4 November 2014 after managing just one win in 11 matches.

On 13 June 2015, Oliveira was appointed as new head coach of Maltese Premier club Floriana, however his tenure lasted less than two months and was replaced by Guido Ugolotti.

In 2025, he took on his first coaching job in women's football, taking over at Riccione Women in the Serie C. In November 2025, he was hired by Serie B club Venezia.

== Career statistics ==
=== Club ===
Appearances and goals by club, season and competition
Club	Season	League			Cup		Total	
Club	Season	Division	Apps	Goals	Apps	Goals	Apps	Goals
Anderlecht	1988–89	Belgian First Division	5	0				
Anderlecht	1989–90	Belgian First Division	26	8				
Anderlecht	1990–91	Belgian First Division	33	18				
Anderlecht	1991–92	Belgian First Division	31	10				
Anderlecht	Total		95	36				
Cagliari	1992–93	Serie A	29	7				
Cagliari	1993–94	Serie A	29	12				
Cagliari	1994–95	Serie A	30	7				
Cagliari	1995–96	Serie A	33	15				
Cagliari	Total		121	41				
Fiorentina	1996–97	Serie A	31	9				
Fiorentina	1997–98	Serie A	33	15				
Fiorentina	1998–99	Serie A	30	2				
Fiorentina	1999–2000	Serie A	1	0				
Fiorentina	Total		95	26				
Cagliari	1999–2000	Serie A	24	4				
Bologna	2000–01	Serie A	17	1				
Como	2001–02	Serie B	38	23				
Catania	2002–03	Serie B	37	13				
Catania	2003–04	Serie B	37	15				
Catania	Total		74	28				
Foggia	2004–05	Serie C1	14	0				
Venezia	2004–05	Serie B	17	5				
Lucchese	2005–06	Serie C1	20	3				
Nuorese	2006–07	Serie C2	32	10				
Nuorese	2007–08	Serie C2	31	15				
Nuorese	Total		63	25				
Derthona	2008–09	Serie D	32	16				
Muravera	2009–10	Eccellenza Sardinia	12	14				
Muravera	2010–11	Eccellenza Sardinia	?	?				
Muravera	Total		12	14				
Career total			622	222				

=== International ===
Scores and results list Belgium's goal tally first, score column indicates score after each Oliveira goal.

List of international goals scored by Luís Oliveira
No.	Date	Venue	Opponent	Score	Result	Competition
1	26 February 1992	Stade El Menzah, Tunis, Tunisia	Tunisia	1–1	1–2	Friendly
2	31 August 1996	King Baudouin Stadium, Brussels, Belgium	Turkey	2–0	2–1	1998 FIFA World Cup qualification
3	30 April 1997	Ali Sami Yen Stadium, Istanbul, Turkey	Turkey	1–0	3–1	1998 FIFA World Cup qualification
4	30 April 1997	Ali Sami Yen Stadium, Istanbul, Turkey	Turkey	2–0	3–1	1998 FIFA World Cup qualification
5	30 April 1997	Ali Sami Yen Stadium, Istanbul, Turkey	Turkey	3–1	3–1	1998 FIFA World Cup qualification
6	7 June 1997	King Baudouin Stadium, Brussels, Belgium	San Marino	4–0	6–0	1998 FIFA World Cup qualification
7	15 November 1997	King Baudouin Stadium, Brussels, Belgium	Republic of Ireland	1–0	2–1	1998 FIFA World Cup qualification

== Honours ==
Anderlecht

- Belgian First Division: 1990–91
- Belgian Cup: 1988–89, 1989–90
- European Cup Winners' Cup runner-up: 1989–90
- Bruges Matins: 1988

Fiorentina

- Supercoppa Italiana: 1996

Como

- Serie B: 2001–02

Individual

- Man of the Season (Belgian First Division): 1990–91
- Serie B topscorer (23 goals): 2001–02
