= Giulio Falcone =

Italian footballer

Personal information
- Full name: Giulio Falcone
- Date of birth: 31 May 1974 (age 52)
- Place of birth: Atri, Italy
- Height: 1.84 m (6 ft 1/2 in)
- Position: Defender

Youth career
- 1992–1993: Torino

Senior career*
Years	Team	Apps	(Gls)
1993–1996	Torino	63	(0)
1996–1999	Fiorentina	82	(1)
1999–2003	Bologna	101	(0)
2003–2007	Sampdoria	102	(0)
2007–2009	Parma	39	(1)

International career^{‡}
1993–1996	Italy U-21	7	(0)
2006	Italy	1	(0)
- * Club domestic league appearances and goals as of May 2008 ‡ National team caps and goals as of August 16, 2006

Giulio Falcone (Italian pronunciation: [ˈdʒuːljo falˈkoːne]; born 31 May 1974) is an Italian former footballer who played as a defender.

== Club career ==
Falcone played for Italian sides Torino, Fiorentina, Bologna, Sampdoria, and Parma throughout his career. He signed for Sampdoria from Bologna on a free transfer in 2003.

== International career ==
Falcone made his Italy national team debut and only appearance for Italy, along with Sampdoria teammates Christian Terlizzi, Gennaro Delvecchio, and Angelo Palombo, in a 2–0 loss to Croatia in Livorno, on 16 August 2006.

== Honours ==
Torino

- Coppa Italia (1) : 1992–93

Fiorentina

- Supercoppa Italiana (1) : 1996
