= Aldo Firicano =

Italian footballer and manager (born 1967)

Personal information
- Date of birth: 12 March 1967 (age 59)
- Place of birth: Trapani, Italy
- Height: 1.84 m (6 ft 1/2 in)
- Position: Defender

Team information
- Current team: Tuttocuoio (head coach)

Senior career*
Years	Team	Apps	(Gls)
1982–1983	Trapani		
1983–1985	Cavese		
1985–1989	Udinese		
1986–1987	Nocerina		
1989–1996	Cagliari	191	(9)
1996–2001	Fiorentina	83	(3)
2001	Salernitana	16	(0)
2001–2002	Arezzo		
2002–2003	ISM Gradisca		
2003–2004	Sestese		

Managerial career
- 2004–2005: Sestese
- 2005–2006: Biellese
- 2006–2008: Südtirol
- 2008–2009: Carrarese
- 2009–2011: Poggibonsi
- 2011–2012: Borgo a Buggiano
- 2012–2013: Pro Patria
- 2014: Pergolettese
- 2015: Forlì
- 2017: Carrarese
- 2021: Prato
- 2022–2023: Sangiovannese
- 2024–: Tuttocuoio
- * Club domestic league appearances and goals

Aldo Firicano (born 12 May 1967) is a former Italian football manager, currently working for Tuttocuoio, and former footballer, who played as a defender.

== Playing career ==
After early years in the minor leagues, Firicano joined Cagliari in 1989, with whom he won promotion to Serie A under Claudio Ranieri and made his top-flight debut in 1990. In 1993, he also played in the UEFA Cup with them.

In 1996 he re-joined Ranieri at Fiorentina. He retired from professional football in 2004.

== Coaching career ==
In 2004, Firicano took over his first coaching role as head coach of Sestese. He successively had a long career in Italy's minor professional and amateur leagues with different teams.

In 2017 he served as head coach of Carrarese. After four years of inactivity, he was named new head coach of Serie D club Prato in February 2021. He left the club by the end of the 2020–21 season, and was successively appointed in charge of Sangiovannese, another Tuscan Serie D club, on 8 March 2022. He departed from Sangiovannese by the end of the 2022–23 season.

In March 2024, Firicano was signed by Tuttocuoio, and successfully guided the Tuscan club to win promotion to Serie D from Eccellenza, being subsequently confirmed in charge of the club.

== Honours ==
Fiorentina

- Supercoppa Italiana: 1996
