= Vittorio Pusceddu =

Italian footballer

Personal information
- Date of birth: 12 February 1964 (age 62)
- Place of birth: Buggerru, Italy
- Position: Defender

Senior career*
Years	Team	Apps	(Gls)
1983–1985	Cagliari	30	(2)
1985–1986	Torino	5	(2)
1986–1987	Ascoli	25	(2)
1987–1988	Udinese	30	(0)
1988	Torino	0	(0)
1988–1989	Genoa	2	(0)
1989–1991	Hellas Verona	61	(7)
1991–1992	Napoli	21	(0)
1992–1996	Cagliari	125	(10)
1996–1997	Fiorentina	28	(0)
1997	Empoli	2	(0)
1997–1998	Torino	21	(0)
Total		350	(23)

Managerial career
- 2003–2004: Cagliari (assistant)
- 2007–2009: Tavolara
- 2012–2015: Cagliari (primavera)
- 2020-: Sardinia
- * Club domestic league appearances and goals

Vittorio Pusceddu (born 12 February 1964) is a retired Italian football defender.

== Honours ==
Fiorentina

- Supercoppa Italiana: 1996
