= 1991–92 US Foggia season =

U.S. Foggia
1991–92 season
- Manager: Zdeněk Zeman
- Stadium: Stadio Pino Zaccheria
- Serie A: 9th
- Top goalscorer: Francesco Baiano (16)
Home colours	Away colours

During the 1991–92 English football season, U.S. Foggia competed in Serie A.

== Season summary ==
Their attacking 4–3–3 formation saw the club score 58 goals, more than any other club but champions A.C. Milan, and challenge for a place in the UEFA Cup. However, their faulty defense – the team also conceded 58 goals, exceeded only by bottom club Ascoli – scuppered their European charge.

== Squad ==
Note: Flags indicate national team as defined under FIFA eligibility rules; some limited exceptions apply. Players may hold more than one non-FIFA nationality.

Pos.	Nation	Player
GK	ITA	Mauro Biolghini
GK	ITA	Francesco Mancini
GK	ITA	Mauro Rosin
DF	ROU	Dan Petrescu
DF	ITA	Maurizio Codispoti
DF	ITA	Angelo Consagra
DF	ITA	Salvatore Fresi
DF	ITA	Gualtiero Grandini
DF	ITA	Salvatore Matrecano
DF	ITA	Tommaso Napoli
DF	ITA	Pasquale Padalino
MF	ITA	Onofrio Barone

Pos.	Nation	Player
MF	ITA	Roberto Genco
MF	ITA	Giuseppe Lo Polito
MF	ITA	Gianluca Musumeci
MF	ITA	Mauro Picasso
MF	ITA	Alessandro Porro
MF	ITA	Carlo Richetti
MF	URS	Igor Shalimov
FW	ITA	Roberto Rambaudi
FW	ITA	Francesco Baiano
FW	ITA	Giuseppe Signori
FW	ITA	Fabio Troccoli
FW	URS	Igor Kolyvanov

== Competitions ==
=== Serie A ===
==== League table ====
Pos	Team	Pld	W	D	L	GF	GA	GD	Pts	Qualification or relegation
7	Parma	34	11	16	7	32	28	+4	38	Qualification to Cup Winners' Cup
8	Internazionale	34	10	17	7	28	28	0	37	
9	Foggia	34	12	11	11	58	58	0	35	
10	Lazio	34	11	12	11	43	40	+3	34	
11	Atalanta	34	10	14	10	31	33	−2	34	

Source: 1991–92 Serie A, RSSSF.com
Rules for classification: 1) Points; 2) Head-to-head points; 3) Head-to-head goal difference; 4) Goal difference; 5) Goals scored; 6) Draw.

==== Matches ====
1 September 1991 1	Inter Milan	1–1	Foggia	Milan
	Ciocci 61'	Report	Baiano 52'	Stadium: Giuseppe Meazza

8 September 1991 2	Foggia	0–1	Juventus	Foggia
		Report	Schillaci 47'	Stadium: Pino Zaccharia

15 September 1991 3	Fiorentina	1–2	Foggia	Florence
	Faccenda 27'	Report	62' Petrescu; 65' Codispoti	Stadium: Stadio Comunale; Attendance: 34 500; Referee: Beschin

22 September 1991 4	Foggia	3–1	Cagliari	Foggia
	Rambaudi 37'; Codispoti 49'; Baiano 82'	Report	84' Criniti	Stadium: Stadio Pino Zaccheria; Attendance: 19 147; Referee: Fabricatore

29 September 1991 5	Foggia	1–1	Parma	Foggia
	Signori 70'	Report	Melli 87'	Stadium: Stadio Pino Zaccheria

6 October 1991 6	Torino	3–1	Foggia	Turin
	Policano 17'; Scifo 28' (pen.); Lentini 54'	Report	81' Baiano	Stadium: Stadio delle Alpi; Attendance: 36 995; Referee: Luci

20 October 1991 7	Foggia	1–0	Ascoli	Foggia
	Signori 79'	Report		Stadium: Stadio Pino Zaccheria; Attendance: 16 913; Referee: Bettin

27 October 1991 8	Roma	1–1	Foggia	Rome
	Petrescu 53' (o.g.)	Report	Shalimov 82'	Stadium: Olimpico

3 November 1991 9	Foggia	4–1	Bari	Foggia
	Baiano 18', 44' (pen.), 80'; Signori 76'	Report	45' Giampaolo II	Stadium: Stadio Pino Zaccheria; Attendance: 20.907; Referee: Trentalange

17 November 1991 10	Cremonese	0–2	Foggia	Cremona
		Report	36' Signori; 40' Baiano	Stadium: Stadio Giovanni Zini; Attendance: 13 580; Referee: Nicchi

24 November 1991 11	Foggia	2–3	Atalanta	Foggia
	Signori 18'; Picasso 46'	Report	11' (o.g.) Consagra; 13', 64' Perrone	Stadium: Stadio Pino Zaccheria; Attendance: 19 940; Referee: Merlino

1 December 1991 12	Hellas Verona	1–0	Foggia	Verona
	Pellegrini II 76'	Report		Stadium: Stadio Marcantonio Bentegodi; Attendance: 25.000; Referee: Stafoggia

8 December 1991 13	Foggia	0–0	Sampdoria	Foggia
		Report		Stadium: Stadio Pino Zaccheria; Attendance: 20 300; Referee: Cinciripini

15 December 1992 14	Napoli	3–3	Foggia	Naples
	Padovano 12'; Careca 21', 53'	Report	Signori 22', 88'; Shalimov 77'	Stadium: San Paolo

5 January 1992 15	Lazio	5–2	Foggia	Rome
	Doll 12'; Riedle 16', 38'; Stroppa 81'; Sergio 83'	Report	Shalimov 12', 21'	Stadium: Olimpico

12 January 1992 16	Foggia	1–0	Genoa	Foggia
	Petrescu 42'	Report		Stadium: Stadio Pino Zaccheria; Attendance: 19.000; Referee: Fucci

19 January 1992 17	Milan	3–1	Foggia	Milan
	van Basten 10' (pen.), 47', 85' (pen.)	Report	Shalimov 64'	Stadium: San Siro

26 January 1992 18	Foggia	2–2	Inter Milan	Foggia
	Baiano 83' (pen.); Petrescu 87'	Report	Matthäus 31' (pen.); Klinsmann 53'	Stadium: Pino Zaccheria

2 February 1992 19	Juventus	4–1	Foggia	Turin
	Baggio 2' (pen.), 51' (pen.), 53'; Casiraghi 90'	Report	Petrescu 63'	Stadium: Delle Alpi

9 February 1992 20	Foggia	3–3	Fiorentina	Foggia
	Rambaudi 29'; Baiano 31'; Šalimov 37'	Report	Batistuta 24'; Batistuta 52'; Batistuta 76'	Stadium: Stadio Pino Zaccheria; Attendance: 21 126; Referee: Bazzoli

16 February 1992 21	Cagliari	2–2	Foggia	Cagliari
	Fonseca 37'; Fonseca 52'	Report	36' Šalimov; 62' Rambaudi	Stadium: Stadio Sant'Elia; Attendance: 22 300; Referee: Pairetto

23 February 1992 22	Parma	2–0	Foggia	Parma
	Agostini 30', 55'	Report		Stadium: Ennio Tardini

1 March 1992 23	Foggia	1–1	Torino	Foggia
	Kolyvanov 78'	Report	43' Scifo	Stadium: Stadio Pino Zaccheria; Attendance: 14 702; Referee: Mughetti

8 March 1992 24	Ascoli	2–1	Foggia	Ascoli Piceno
	D'Ainzara 39'; Bierhoff 71'	Report	80' Porro I	Stadium: Stadio Cino e Lillo Del Duca; Attendance: 9.000; Referee: Quartuccio

22 March 1992 25	Foggia	1–2	Roma	Foggia
	Signori 90'	Report	Häßler 14'; Aldair 74'	Stadium: Stadio Pino Zaccheria

29 March 1992 26	Bari	1–3	Foggia	Bari
	Platt 57' (pen.)	Report	5' Baiano; 32' Šalimov; 85' Kolyvanov	Stadium: Stadio San Nicola; Attendance: 48 500; Referee: Luci

5 April 1992 27	Foggia	2–0	Cremonese	Foggia
	Signori 25'; Kolyvanov 48'	Report		Stadium: Stadio Pino Zaccheria; Attendance: 20 221; Referee: Boggi

12 April 1992 28	Atalanta	4–4	Foggia	Bergamo
	Consagra 38' (o.g.); Cornacchia 74', 84', 87'	Report	40' Baiano; 53' (o.g.) Minaudo; 59' Šalimov; 71' Rambaudi	Stadium: Stadio Comunale; Attendance: 19 000; Referee: Brignoccoli

18 April 1992 29	Foggia	5–0	Hellas Verona	Foggia
	Rambaudi 25', 44'; Baiano 65', 88' (pen.), 90'	Report		Stadium: Stadio Pino Zaccheria; Attendance: 30 000; Referee: Lanese

26 April 1992 30	Sampdoria	1–1	Foggia	Genoa
	Vialli 65'	Report	23' Rambaudi	Stadium: Stadio Luigi Ferraris; Attendance: 28 130; Referee: Bazzoli

3 May 1992 31	Foggia	1–0	Napoli	Foggia
	Padalino 84'	Report		Stadium: Stadio Pino Zaccheria

10 May 1992 32	Foggia	2–1	Lazio	Foggia
	Rambaudi 49'; Baiano 52'	Report	Sosa 90'	Stadium: Stadio Pino Zaccheria

17 May 1992 33	Genoa	0–2	Foggia	Genoa
		Report	39' Rambaudi; 46' Signori	Stadium: Stadio Luigi Ferraris; Attendance: 25 300; Referee: Scaramuzza

24 May 1992 34	Foggia	2–8	Milan	Foggia
	Signori 39'; Baiano 41'	Report	Maldini 22'; Gullit 47' van Basten 52', 82'; Matrecano 59' (o.g.); Simone 72', 74'; Fuser 87'	Stadium: Stadio Pino Zaccheria

=== Coppa Italia ===
Round of 16

28 August 1991	Pisa	2–1	Foggia	Pisa
	Cristallini 26'; Scarafoni 80' (pen.)		31' Ricchetti	Stadium: Stadio Arena Garibaldi; Referee: Beschin

3 September 1991	Foggia	1–1	Pisa	Campobasso
	Rambaudi 14'		55' Ferrante	Stadium: Stadio Nuovo Romagnoli; Referee: Amendolia

== Statistics ==
=== Player statistics ===
No.	Pos	Nat	Player	Total		Serie A		Coppa Italia		1992 Mitropa Cup	
No.	Pos	Nat	Player	Apps	Goals	Apps	Goals	Apps	Goals	Apps	Goals
	GK	(Italy) ITA	Mancini	31	-50	30	-48	1	-2		
	DF	(Romania) ROU	Petrescu	28	4	24+1	4	2	0	1	0
	DF	(Italy) ITA	Codispoti	37	2	33+1	2	2	0	1	0
	DF	(Italy) ITA	Consagra	30	0	28+1	0	1	0		
	DF	(Italy) ITA	Matrecano	30	0	27+1	0	2	0		
	MF	(Italy) ITA	Barone	37	0	34	0	2	0	1	0
	MF	(Italy) ITA	Picasso	23	1	19+1	1	2	0	1	0
	MF	(Soviet Union) URS	Shalimov	34	9	33	9	1	0		
	FW	(Italy) ITA	Baiano	35	18	33	16	1	0	1	2
	FW	(Italy) ITA	Signori	34	11	31+1	11	2	0		
	FW	(Italy) ITA	Rambaudi	36	10	32+1	9	2	1	1	0
	GK	(Italy) ITA	Rosin	8	-13	4+2	-10	1	-1	1	-2
	DF	(Italy) ITA	Grandini	18	0	16+1	0	0	0	1	0
	DF	(Italy) ITA	Padalino	16	1	12+3	1	0	0	1	0
	MF	(Italy) ITA	Porro	24	1	8+13	1	2	0	1	0
	FW	(Soviet Union) URS	Kolyvanov	15	3	5+10	3				
	DF	(Italy) ITA	Napoli	10	0	4+5	0	1	0		
	MF	(Italy) ITA	Lo Polito	2	0	1+1	0				
	MF	(Italy) ITA	Musumeci	4	1	0+3	0				
	MF	(Italy) ITA	Richetti	1	1	0	0	1	1		
	DF	(Italy) ITA	Fresi	1	0	0	0	0	0	1	0
	GK	(Italy) ITA	Biolghini								
	MF	(Italy) ITA	Genco								
	FW	(Italy) ITA	Troccoli								

- Source: http://calcio-seriea.net/presenze/1991/1025/
