= 1995–96 SS Lazio season =

Lazio
1995–96 season
- Owner: Sergio Cragnotti
- President: Dino Zoff
- Manager: Zdeněk Zeman
- Serie A: 3rd
- Coppa Italia: Quarter-finals
- UEFA Cup: Round of 32
- Top goalscorer: League: Giuseppe Signori (24); All: Giuseppe Signori (26)
Home colours	Away colours	Third colours

The 1995–96 season was Società Sportiva Lazio's 96th season since the club's existence and their eighth consecutive season in the top-flight of Italian football. In this season, Lazio finished third in Serie A this season and reached the quarter-final of the Coppa Italia and the round of 32 of the UEFA Cup.

== Squad ==
Note: Flags indicate national team as defined under FIFA eligibility rules; some limited exceptions apply. Players may hold more than one non-FIFA nationality.

No.	Pos.	Nation	Player
1	GK	ITA	Luca Marchegiani
2	DF	ITA	Paolo Negro
3	DF	ITA	Alessandro Romano
4	MF	ITA	Dario Marcolin
5	DF	ITA	Giuseppe Favalli
6	DF	ARG	José Chamot
7	FW	ITA	Roberto Rambaudi
8	FW	CRO	Alen Bokšić
9	FW	ITA	Pierluigi Casiraghi
10	MF	NED	Aron Winter
11	FW	ITA	Giuseppe Signori
12	GK	ITA	Fernando Orsi
13	DF	ITA	Alessandro Nesta
14	MF	ITA	Diego Fuser

No.	Pos.	Nation	Player
15	MF	ITA	Massimiliano Esposito
16	MF	ITA	Roberto Di Matteo
17	DF	SUI	Guerino Gottardi
19	FW	ITA	Marco Di Vaio
20	DF	ITA	Cristiano Bergodi
21	MF	ITA	Marco Piovanelli
23	FW	ITA	Alessandro Ianuzzi
24	DF	ITA	Alessandro Grandoni
26	MF	ITA	Daniele Franceschini
29	GK	ITA	Francesco Mancini
—	DF	ITA	Roberto Cravero
—	MF	ITA	Ivano Della Morte

=== Transfers ===
In
Pos.	Name	from	Type
DF	Guerino Gottardi	Neuchatel Xamax	
MF	Massimiliano Esposito	A.C. Reggiana	
DF	Alessandro Grandoni	Ternana	
DF	Alessandro Romano	Cesena	
MF	Marco Piovanelli	Brescia Calcio	
MF	Ivano Della Morte	Lecce	loan ended
GK	Giorgio Frezzolini	Carpi	loan ended
MF	Dario Marcolin	Genoa C.F.C.	loan ended
MF	Claudio Sclosa	U.S. Cremonese	loan ended

Out
Pos.	Name	To	Type
MF	Paul Gascoigne	Glasgow Rangers	
MF	Giorgio Venturin	Cagliari Calcio	loan
GK	Giorgio Frezzolini	Internazionale	
GK	Flavio Roma	Venezia F.C.	loan
DF	Roberto Bacci	Torino	
DF	Mauro Bonomi	Cagliari Calcio	
DF	Roberto Cravero	Torino	
MF	Leonardo Colucci	A.C. Reggiana	
MF	Domenico Cristiano	Venezia F.C.	
MF	Claudio Sclosa	Pistoiese	

==== Winter ====
In
Pos.	Name	from	Type
GK	Francesco Mancini	Foggia Calcio	loan

Out
Pos.	Name	To	Type
MF	Ivano Della Morte	Avellino	
FW	Marco Di Vaio	Hellas Verona	loan

== Competitions ==
=== Serie A ===
==== League table ====
Pos	Team	Pld	W	D	L	GF	GA	GD	Pts	Qualification or relegation
1	Milan (C)	34	21	10	3	60	24	+36	73	Qualified to Champions League
2	Juventus	34	19	8	7	58	35	+23	65 (Note: Juventus qualified to 1996–97 UEFA Champions League as title holders.)	Qualified to Champions League
3	Lazio	34	17	8	9	66	38	+28	59	Qualification to UEFA Cup
4	Fiorentina	34	17	8	9	53	41	+12	59	Qualification to Cup Winners' Cup
5	Roma	34	16	10	8	51	34	+17	58 (Note: ROM 1-1 PAR; PAR 1-1 ROM Roma is ahead due to Goal difference.)	Qualification to UEFA Cup

Source: 1995–96 Serie A, RSSSF.com, Soccerway
Rules for classification: 1) Points; 2) Head-to-head points; 3) Head-to-head goal difference; 4) Goal difference; 5) Goals scored; 6) Draw. (Note: Head-to-head record is used only after all the matches between the teams in question have been played).
(C) Champions

==== Results summary ====
Overall								Home						Away					
Pld	W	D	L	GF	GA	GD	Pts	W	D	L	GF	GA	GD	W	D	L	GF	GA	GD
34	17	8	9	66	38	+28	59	13	2	2	45	15	+30	4	6	7	21	23	−2

==== Results by round ====
Round	1	2	3	4	5	6	7	8	9	10	11	12	13	14	15	16	17	18	19	20	21	22	23	24	25	26	27	28	29	30	31	32	33	34
Ground	H	A	A	H	A	H	A	H	A	H	A	H	A	H	H	A	H	A	H	H	A	H	A	H	A	A	H	A	H	H	A	A	H	A
Result	W	W	D	D	D	W	D	W	L	W	L	L	L	W	W	L	D	L	W	W	D	W	W	L	L	L	W	D	W	W	D	W	W	W
Position	1	1	3	4	5	3	5	3	4	3	3	6	7	5	4	5	5	6	5	4	5	5	4	5	6	6	6	7	7	5	6	5	4	3

Source: Competitive matches
A = Away; H = Home; W = Win; D = Draw; L = Loss; = Leader, 1996–97 UEFA Champions League Group stage; = 1996–97 UEFA Cup First round

==== Matches ====
27 August 1995 1	Lazio	4–1	Piacenza	Rome
15:00 CEST (UTC+02:00)	Signori 32'; Esposito 48', 73'; Casiraghi 78' (pen.)	Report	Caccia 81' (pen.)	Stadium: Stadio Olimpico; Attendance: 43,705; Referee: Gennaro Borriello

10 September 1995 2	Cagliari	0–1	Lazio	Cagliari
15:00 CEST (UTC+02:00)			Signori 22'	Stadium: Stadio Sant'Elia; Attendance: 21,160; Referee: Marcello Nicchi

17 September 1995 3	Bari	3–3	Lazio	Bari
15:00 CEST (UTC+02:00)	Protti 8', 14', 49'		Winter 43'; Casiraghi 57'; Signori 59' (pen.)	Stadium: Stadio San Nicola; Attendance: 30,786; Referee: Stefano Braschi

24 September 1995 4	Lazio	2–2	Udinese	Rome
15:00 CEST (UTC+02:00)	Signori 13' (pen.); Fuser 42'	Report	Helveg 72'; Bierhoff 87'	Stadium: Stadio Olimpico; Attendance: 43,232; Referee: Cosimo Bolognino

1 October 1995 5	Roma	0–0	Lazio	Rome
20:30 CEST (UTC+02:00)		Report		Stadium: Stadio Olimpico; Attendance: 74,205; Referee: Graziano Cesari

15 October 1995 6	Lazio	2–0	Padova	Rome
15:00 CEST (UTC+02:00)	Rosa 74' (o.g.); Fuser 80'	Report		Stadium: Stadio Olimpico; Attendance: 39,342; Referee: Domenico Messina

22 October 1995 7	Internazionale	0–0	Lazio	Milan
15:00 CEST (UTC+02:00)		Report		Stadium: San Siro; Attendance: 47,688; Referee: Piero Ceccarini

29 October 1995 8	Lazio	4–0	Juventus	Rome
15:00 CET (UTC+01:00)	Signori 40'; Casiraghi 45', 77'; Rambaudi 71'	Report		Stadium: Stadio Olimpico; Attendance: 70,576; Referee: Pierluigi Collina

5 November 1995 9	Fiorentina	2–0	Lazio	Florence
15:00 CET (UTC+01:00)	Batistuta 46', 80'	Report		Stadium: Stadio Artemio Franchi; Attendance: 39,630; Referee: Pierluigi Pairetto

19 November 1995 10	Lazio	2–1	Cremonese	Rome
15:00 CET (UTC+01:00)	Winter 28'; Casiraghi 65'		Maspero 72' (pen.)	Stadium: Stadio Olimpico; Attendance: 39,429; Referee: Gianni Beschin

26 November 1995 11	Vicenza	1–0	Lazio	Vicenza
15:00 CET (UTC+01:00)	Maini 42'	Report		Stadium: Stadio Romeo Menti; Attendance: 16,523; Referee: Stefano Farina

3 December 1995 12	Lazio	0–1	Milan	Rome
15:00 CET (UTC+01:00)		Report	Weah 87'	Stadium: Stadio Olimpico; Attendance: 61,800; Referee: Fiorenzo Treossi

10 December 1995 13	Parma	2–1	Lazio	Parma
15:00 CET (UTC+01:00)	Asprilla 36'; Zola 47'	Report	Di Matteo 90'	Stadium: Stadio Ennio Tardini; Attendance: 24,478; Referee: Alfredo Trentalange

17 December 1995 14	Lazio	6–3	Sampdoria	Rome
15:00 CET (UTC+01:00)	Signori 18', 40' (pen.); Mihajlović 45' (o.g.); Winter 57'; Casiraghi 67'; Fuser 70'	Report	Mihajlović 37'; Chiesa 65', 76' (pen.)	Stadium: Stadio Olimpico; Attendance: 36,888; Referee: Livio Bazzoli

23 December 1995 15	Lazio	5–1	Atalanta	Rome
15:00 CET (UTC+01:00)	Winter 14', 88'; Signori 43' (pen.), 54' (pen.); Bokšić 50'	Report	Tovalieri 49'	Stadium: Stadio Olimpico; Attendance: 46,102; Referee: Loris Stafoggia

7 January 1996 16	Napoli	1–0	Lazio	Naples
15:00 CET (UTC+01:00)	Di Napoli 26'	Report		Stadium: Stadio San Paolo; Attendance: 38,786; Referee: Piero Ceccarini

14 January 1996 17	Lazio	1–1	Torino	Rome
15:00 CET (UTC+01:00)	Iannuzzi 90'	Report	Rizzitelli 81'	Stadium: Stadio Olimpico; Attendance: 38,330; Referee: Roberto Bettin

21 January 1996 18	Piacenza	2–1	Lazio	Piacenza
15:00 CET (UTC+01:00)	Piovani 67'; Caccia 79'	Report	Bokšić 49'	Stadium: Stadio Galleana; Attendance: 12,449; Referee: Robert Boggi

28 January 1996 19	Lazio	4–0	Cagliari	Rome
15:00 CET (UTC+01:00)	Signori 27' (pen.); Casiraghi 28', 34', 45'	Report		Stadium: Stadio Olimpico; Attendance: 38,704; Referee: Salvatore Racalbuto

4 February 1996 20	Lazio	4–3	Bari	Rome
15:00 CET (UTC+01:00)	Signori 20' (pen.), 24' (pen.), 30'; Bokšić 79'	Report	Protti 9' (pen.), 81' (pen.); K. Andersson 63'	Stadium: Stadio Olimpico; Attendance: 38,538; Referee: Daniele Tombolini

11 February 1996 21	Udinese	1–1	Lazio	Udine
15:00 CET (UTC+01:00)	Negro 10' (o.g.)	Report	Fuser 90'	Stadium: Stadio Friuli; Attendance: 11,620; Referee: Fiorenzo Treossi

18 February 1996 22	Lazio	1–0	Roma	Rome
20:30 CET (UTC+01:00)	Signori 84' (pen.)	Report		Stadium: Stadio Olimpico; Attendance: 69,603; Referee: Marcello Nicchi

25 February 1996 23	Padova	1–3	Lazio	Padua
15:00 CET (UTC+01:00)	Amoruso 90' (pen.)	Report	Signori 35'; Casiraghi 67'; Fuser 85'	Stadium: Stadio Euganeo; Attendance: 13,506; Referee: Graziano Cesari

3 March 1996 24	Lazio	0–1	Internazionale	Rome
15:00 CET (UTC+01:00)		Report	Nesta 64' (o.g.)	Stadium: Stadio Olimpico; Attendance: 48,355; Referee: Piero Ceccarini

10 March 1996 25	Juventus	4–2	Lazio	Turin
15:00 CET (UTC+01:00)	Deschamps 35'; Chamot 70' (o.g.); Conte 72'; Padovano 83'	Report	Favalli 3'; Casiraghi 18'	Stadium: Stadio delle Alpi; Attendance: 39,689; Referee: Domenico Messina

24 March 1996 27	Cremonese	2–1	Lazio	Cremona
15:00 CET (UTC+01:00)	Tentoni 53', 81'	Report	Negro 46'	Stadium: Stadio Giovanni Zini; Attendance: 13,170; Referee: Gennaro Borriello

31 March 1996 28	Lazio	3–0	Vicenza	Rome
15:00 CEST (UTC+02:00)	Signori 45' (pen.), 54', 57' (pen.)	Report		Stadium: Stadio Olimpico; Attendance: 39,102; Referee: Stefano Farina

6 April 1996 29	Milan	0–0	Lazio	Milan
15:00 CEST (UTC+02:00)		Report		Stadium: San Siro; Attendance: 60,528; Referee: Pasquale Rodomonti

10 April 1996 26	Lazio	4–0	Fiorentina	Rome
20:30 CEST (UTC+02:00)	Winter 14'; Signori 32', 51'; Casiraghi 83'	Report		Stadium: Stadio Olimpico; Attendance: 46,596; Referee: Emilio Pellegrino

14 April 1996 30	Lazio	2–1	Parma	Rome
15:00 CEST (UTC+02:00)	Fuser 14'; Casiraghi 39'	Report	Zola 80'	Stadium: Stadio Olimpico; Attendance: 41,301; Referee: Pierluigi Pairetto

20 April 1996 31	Sampdoria	3–3	Lazio	Genoa
15:00 CEST (UTC+02:00)	Balleri 25'; Mancini 53'; Chiesa 87'	Report	Casiraghi 21'; Signori 37', 64'	Stadium: Stadio Luigi Ferraris; Attendance: 27,921; Referee: Loris Stafoggia

28 April 1996 32	Atalanta	1–3	Lazio	Bergamo
15:00 CEST (UTC+02:00)	Morfeo 34'	Report	Valentini 13' (o.g.); Signori 58' (pen.); Esposito 85'	Stadium: Stadio Atleti Azzurri d'Italia; Attendance: 17,070; Referee: Salvatore Racalbuto

5 May 1996 33	Lazio	1–0	Napoli	Rome
15:00 CEST (UTC+02:00)	Di Matteo 19'	Report		Stadium: Stadio Olimpico; Attendance: 45,911; Referee: Cosimo Bolognino

12 May 1996 34	Torino	0–2	Lazio	Turin
15:00 CEST (UTC+02:00)		Report	Bokšić 1'; Signori 9'	Stadium: Stadio delle Alpi; Attendance: 15,202; Referee: Marcello Nicchi

=== Coppa Italia ===
==== Second round ====
30 August 1995	Chievo	1–1 (a.e.t.) (3–4 p)	Lazio	Verona
	Giordano 81'		Di Vaio 42'	Stadium: Stadio Marcantonio Bentegodi; Referee: Cosimo Bolognino
	Penalties
	Zattarin (penalty missed); Cossato (penalty scored); Antonioli (penalty scored); Gentilini (penalty scored); D'Anna (penalty missed)		(penalty scored) Cravero; (penalty scored) Marcolin; (penalty scored) Signori; (penalty scored) Winter; (penalty missed) Favalli

==== Round of 16 ====
25 October 1995	Udinese	0–1	Lazio	Udine
			Signori 66'	Stadium: Stadio Friuli; Attendance: 9,000; Referee: Livio Bazzoli

==== Quarter-finals ====
29 November 1995 First leg	Internazionale	1–1	Lazio	Milan
	Ganz 75'		Rambaudi 83'	Stadium: San Siro; Attendance: 25,957; Referee: Livio Bazzoli

12 December 1995 Second leg	Lazio	0–1 (1–2 agg.)	Internazionale	Rome
			Berti 77'	Stadium: Stadio Olimpico; Attendance: 25,000; Referee: Pierluigi Collina

=== UEFA Cup ===
==== First round ====
12 September 1995 First leg	Lazio (Italy)	5–0	(Cyprus) Omonia	Rome, Italy
20:30 CEST (UTC+02:00)	Casiraghi 11', 16', 87'; Rambaudi 52'; Signori 55' (pen.)	Report		Stadium: Stadio Olimpico; Attendance: 30,660; Referee: Werner Müller (Switzerland)

26 September 1995 Second leg	Omonia (Cyprus)	1–2 (1–7 agg.)	(Italy) Lazio	Nicosia, Cyprus
19:30 CEST (UTC+02:00)	Xiourouppas 68'	Report	Casiraghi 15'; Di Vaio 75'	Stadium: Makario Stadium; Attendance: 4,400; Referee: Hermann Albrecht (Germany)

==== Second round ====
17 October 1995 First leg	Lyon (France)	2–1	(Italy) Lazio	Lyon, France
20:30 CEST (UTC+02:00)	Devaux 15'; Deplace 64'	Report	Winter 24'	Stadium: Stade de Gerland; Attendance: 29,800; Referee: Markus Merk (Germany)

31 October 1995 Second leg	Lazio (Italy)	0–2 (1–4 agg.)	(France) Lyon	Rome, Italy
20:30 CET (UTC+01:00)		Report	Maurice 21'; Assadourian 59'	Stadium: Stadio Olimpico; Attendance: 40,340; Referee: Juan Ansuátegui Roca (Spain)

== Statistics ==
=== Players statistics ===
No.	Pos	Nat	Player	Total		Serie A		Coppa		UEFA	
No.	Pos	Nat	Player	Apps	Goals	Apps	Goals	Apps	Goals	Apps	Goals
1	GK	(Italy) ITA	Marchegiani	31	-30	26	-26	2	-1	3	-3
2	DF	(Italy) ITA	Negro	39	1	31	1	4	0	4	0
6	DF	(Argentina) ARG	Chamot	37	0	32	0	4	0	1	0
13	DF	(Italy) ITA	Nesta	28	0	20+3	0	2	0	3	0
5	DF	(Italy) ITA	Favalli	32	1	26	1	3	0	3	0
14	MF	(Italy) ITA	Fuser	39	6	32	6	4	0	3	0
10	MF	(Netherlands) NED	Winter	37	7	29+1	6	3	0	4	1
16	MF	(Switzerland) SUI	Di Matteo	38	2	30+1	2	3	0	4	0
9	FW	(Italy) ITA	Casiraghi	35	18	25+3	14	3	0	4	4
11	FW	(Italy) ITA	Signori	38	26	31	24	4	1	3	1
8	FW	(Croatia) CRO	Boksic	26	4	20+3	4	1	0	2	0
29	GK	(Italy) ITA	Mancini	8	-9	6	-7	2	-2		
7	FW	(Italy) ITA	Rambaudi	35	3	18+10	1	4	1	3	1
17	DF	(Switzerland) SUI	Gottardi	23	0	12+8	0	2	0	1	0
4	MF	(Italy) ITA	Marcolin	25	0	8+12	0	3	0	2	0
15	MF	(Italy) ITA	Esposito	20	3	8+9	3	2	0	1	0
20	DF	(Italy) ITA	Bergodi	21	0	8+7	0	3	0	3	0
3	MF	(Italy) ITA	Romano	12	0	5+2	0	2	0	3	0
24	DF	(Italy) ITA	Grandoni	4	0	3+1	0				
12	GK	(Italy) ITA	Orsi	7	-7	2+3	-5	0	0	2	-2
21		(Italy) ITA	Piovanelli	21	0	1+15	0	1	0	4	0
26	DF	(Italy) ITA	Franceschini	2	0	1+1	0				
23	FW	(Italy) ITA	Ianuzzi	4	1	0+4	1				
	DF	(Italy) ITA	Cravero	1	0	0	0	1	0		
		(Italy) ITA	Della Morte	0	0	-	-	-	-	-	-
19	FW	(Italy) ITA	Di Vaio	3	2	0	0	1	1	2	1
	GK	(Italy) ITA	Rocco	0	0	0	0				

- Source: http://calcio-seriea.net/presenze/1995/1098/
