= Giuseppe Pavone (footballer) =

Italian footballer

Personal information
- Date of birth: February 15, 1950 (age 76)
- Place of birth: Barletta, Italy
- Height: 1.74 m (5 ft 8 1/2 in)
- Position: Midfielder

Senior career*
Years	Team	Apps	(Gls)
1967–1975	Foggia	159	(20)
1969–1970	→ Torino (loan)	0	(0)
1975–1978	Internazionale	57	(7)
1978–1979	Pescara	23	(1)
1979–1981	Taranto	75	(2)
1981–1986	Cavese	160	(9)
- * Club domestic league appearances and goals

Giuseppe Pavone (born February 15, 1950, in Barletta) is a retired Italian professional football player, most recently in charge as director of football of Foggia.

He is best famous for having served as Foggia's director of football during the club's most successful period, when the Satanelli played in the Serie A in the 1990s under the guidance of head coach Zdeněk Zeman and chairman Pasquale Casillo. He is known for having discovered many of the players of that team, including Giuseppe Signori, Igor Kolyvanov, Roberto Rambaudi, Francesco Baiano and Dan Petrescu.

== Career ==
Born in Barletta, Pavone began playing football with Foggia. He made his Serie A debut against Lazio on 13 December 1970.

He returned at his old job at Foggia in July 2010, after Pasquale Casillo re-bought the Apulian club.

Starting from July 2018, Giuseppe Pavone is Cavese 1919 Football Executive again.

In July 2021, following a club takeover at Foggia, the new ownership hired both Pavone and Zeman as their respective director of football and head coach, marking a third comeback with the Satanelli for the duo. On 23 January 2022, Pavone was sacked from his role following a home Serie C league defeat against Latina; however, the move was reversed just two days later, with both Zeman and Pavone being extended their contracts until 30 June 2023. On 25 May 2022, Foggia confirmed the departure of both Zeman and Pavone.
