= 1994–95 SS Lazio season =

Lazio
1994–95 season
- Owner: Sergio Cragnotti
- President: Dino Zoff
- Manager: Zdeněk Zeman
- Stadium: Stadio Olimpico
- Serie A: 2nd
- Coppa Italia: Semi-finals
- UEFA Cup: Quarter-finals
- Top goalscorer: League: Giuseppe Signori (17); All: Giuseppe Signori (21)
Home colours	Away colours	Third colours

The 1994–95 season was Società Sportiva Lazio's 95th season since the club's existence and their seventh consecutive season in the top-flight of Italian football. In this season, Lazio finished in second place in Serie A this season and reached the quarter-final of the UEFA Cup.

== Squad ==
Note: Flags indicate national team as defined under FIFA eligibility rules; some limited exceptions apply. Players may hold more than one non-FIFA nationality.

Pos.	Nation	Player
GK	ITA	Luca Marchegiani
GK	ITA	Fernando Orsi
GK	ITA	Flavio Roma
DF	ITA	Daniele Adani
DF	ITA	Cristiano Bergodi
DF	ITA	Mauro Bonomi
DF	ARG	José Chamot
DF	ITA	Roberto Cravero
DF	ITA	Giuseppe Favalli
DF	ITA	Alessandro Nesta
DF	ITA	Paolo Negro
DF	ITA	Roberto Bacci
MF	ITA	Leonardo Colucci

Pos.	Nation	Player
MF	ITA	Vincenzo De Sio
MF	ITA	Ivano Della Morte
MF	ITA	Roberto Di Matteo
MF	GER	Thomas Doll
MF	ITA	Diego Fuser
MF	ENG	Paul Gascoigne
MF	ITA	Giorgio Venturin
MF	NED	Aron Winter
FW	ITA	Roberto Rambaudi
FW	ITA	Pierluigi Casiraghi
FW	ITA	Giuseppe Signori
FW	CRO	Alen Bokšić
FW	ITA	Marco Di Vaio

=== Transfers ===
In
Pos.	Name	from	Type
DF	José Chamot	Foggia Calcio	
MF	Giorgio Venturin	Torino	
FW	Roberto Rambaudi	Atalanta B.C.	
DF	Daniele Adani	Modena F.C.	
MF	Vincenzo De Sio	Trapani	
MF	Ivano Della Morte	A.C. Monza	
GK	Giorgio Frezzolini	Cerveteri	loan ended
GK	Flavio Roma	Mantova	loan ended
MF	Thomas Doll	Eintracht Frankfurt	loan ended
MF	Dario Marcolin	Cagliari Calcio	loan ended

Out
Pos.	Name	To	Type
MF	Thomas Doll	Eintracht Frankfurt	
DF	Luigi Corino	Brescia Calcio	
DF	Luca Luzardi	S.S.C. Napoli	
GK	Giorgio Frezzolini	Carpi	loan
MF	Dario Marcolin	Genoa C.F.C.	loan
MF	Claudio Sclosa	U.S. Cremonese	loan

==== Winter ====
In
Pos.	Name	from	Type
MF	Leonardo Colucci	Siracusa	

Out
Pos.	Name	To	Type
DF	Daniele Adani	Brescia Calcio	
MF	Ivano Della Morte	Lecce	loan

== Competitions ==
=== Serie A ===
==== League table ====
Pos	Team	Pld	W	D	L	GF	GA	GD	Pts	Qualification or relegation
1	Juventus (C)	34	23	4	7	59	32	+27	73	Qualified to Champions League
2	Parma	34	18	9	7	51	31	+20	63	Qualification to Cup Winners' Cup
3	Lazio	34	19	6	9	69	34	+35	63	Qualification to UEFA Cup
4	Milan	34	17	9	8	53	32	+21	60	Qualification to UEFA Cup
5	Roma	34	16	11	7	46	25	+21	59	Qualification to UEFA Cup

Source: Serie A, RSSSF.com, Soccerway
Rules for classification: 1) Points; 2) Head-to-head points; 3) Head-to-head goal difference; 4) Goal difference; 5) Goals scored; 6) Draw. (Note: Head-to-head record is used only after all the matches between the teams in question have been played).
(C) Champions

==== Results summary ====
Overall								Home						Away					
Pld	W	D	L	GF	GA	GD	Pts	W	D	L	GF	GA	GD	W	D	L	GF	GA	GD
34	19	6	9	69	34	+35	63	12	2	3	51	17	+34	7	4	6	18	17	+1

==== Results by round ====
Round	1	2	3	4	5	6	7	8	9	10	11	12	13	14	15	16	17	18	19	20	21	22	23	24	25	26	27	28	29	30	31	32	33	34
Ground	A	H	A	H	A	H	A	H	A	H	H	A	H	A	H	A	H	H	A	H	A	H	A	H	A	H	A	A	H	A	H	A	H	A
Result	W	W	L	D	D	W	W	W	D	W	L	D	L	W	L	W	W	D	L	W	L	W	L	W	D	W	L	W	D	W	W	W	W	W
Position	1	1	3	2	4	3	3	2	2	2	4	4	5	4	5	3	3	3	4	3	4	3	5	5	5	4	5	4	4	5	4	3	3	2

Source: Competitive matches
A = Away; H = Home; W = Win; D = Draw; L = Loss; = Leader, 1995–96 UEFA Champions League Group stage; = 1995–96 UEFA Cup First round

==== Matches ====
4 September 1994 1	Bari	0–1	Lazio	Bari
		Report	Signori 22'	Stadium: Stadio San Nicola; Attendance: 35,903; Referee: Pierluigi Collina

11 September 1994 2	Lazio	3–0	Torino	Rome
	Signori 25', 40'; Bokšić 36'	Report		Stadium: Stadio Olimpico; Attendance: 47,019; Referee: Angelo Amendolia

18 September 1994 3	Milan	2–1	Lazio	Milan
	Gullit 77', 90'	Report	Bokšić 88'	Stadium: San Siro; Attendance: 63,725; Referee: Pierluigi Pairetto

25 September 1994 4	Lazio	2–2	Parma	Rome
	Signori 26', 74'	Report	Branca 66', 70'	Stadium: Stadio Olimpico; Attendance: 50,740; Referee: Alfredo Trentalange

2 October 1994 5	Fiorentina	1–1	Lazio	Florence
	Batistuta 60'	Report	Bergodi 90'	Stadium: Stadio Artemio Franchi; Attendance: 36,480; Referee: Gianni Beschin

16 October 1994 6	Lazio	5–1	Napoli	Rome
	Bokšić 3'; Winter 20', 42'; Casiraghi 36'; Negro 38'	Report	Pecchia 33'	Stadium: Stadio Olimpico; Attendance: 47,983; Referee: Piero Ceccarini

23 October 1994 7	Genoa	1–2	Lazio	Genoa
	Marcolin 66'	Report	Negro 78'; Signori 88'	Stadium: Stadio Luigi Ferraris; Attendance: 23,596; Referee: Stefano Braschi

30 October 1994 8	Lazio	1–0	Cremonese	Rome
	Signori 73'	Report		Stadium: Stadio Olimpico; Attendance: 44,175; Referee: Luca Dinelli

6 November 1994 9	Reggiana	0–0	Lazio	Reggio Emilia
		Report		Stadium: Stadio Mirabello; Attendance: 14,205; Referee: Walter Cinciripini

20 November 1994 10	Lazio	5–1	Padova	Rome
	Rambaudi 45'; Lalas 50' (o.g.); Signori 51'; Di Vaio 77'; Winter 90'	Report	Maniero 9'	Stadium: Stadio Olimpico; Attendance: 40,164; Referee: Cosimo Bolognino

27 November 1994 11	Lazio	0–3	Roma	Rome
		Report	Balbo 2'; Cappioli 25'; Fonseca 51'	Stadium: Stadio Olimpico; Attendance: 75,361; Referee: Robert Boggi

4 December 1994 12	Cagliari	1–1	Lazio	Cagliari
	Herrera 60' (pen.)	Report	Fuser 72'	Stadium: Stadio Sant'Elia; Attendance: 16,054; Referee: Graziano Cesari

11 December 1994 13	Lazio	3–4	Juventus	Rome
	Rambaudi 20'; Casiraghi 83'; Fuser 90'	Report	Del Piero 37', 77'; Marocchi 57'; Grabbi 81'	Stadium: Stadio Olimpico; Attendance: 60,694; Referee: Livio Bazzoli

18 December 1994 14	Internazionale	0–2	Lazio	Milan
		Report	Cravero 11'; Fuser 43'	Stadium: San Siro; Attendance: 32,792; Referee: Piero Ceccarini

8 January 1995 15	Sampdoria	3–1	Lazio	Genoa
	Mihajlović 8'; Platt 35' (pen.), 50'	Report	Signori 12'	Stadium: Stadio Luigi Ferraris; Attendance: 20,000; Referee: Angelo Amendolia

15 January 1995 16	Lazio	7–1	Foggia	Rome
	Bokšić 48', 52', 88'; Signori 64', 85'; Casiraghi 83'; Fuser 90'	Report	Mandelli 61'	Stadium: Stadio Olimpico; Attendance: 42,606; Referee: Gianni Beschin

22 January 1995 17	Brescia	0–1	Lazio	Brescia
		Report	Bokšić 27'	Stadium: Stadio Mario Rigamonti; Attendance: 9,934; Referee: Robert Boggi

29 January 1995 18	Lazio	1–2	Bari	Rome
	Signori 90'	Report	Tovalieri 58', 78'	Stadium: Stadio Olimpico; Attendance: 46,699; Referee: Gennaro Borriello

12 February 1995 19	Torino	2–0	Lazio	Turin
	Pelé 52'; Angloma 74'	Report		Stadium: Stadio delle Alpi; Attendance: 17,780; Referee: Roberto Bettin

19 February 1995 20	Lazio	4–0	Milan	Rome
	Casiraghi 10'; Signori 52', 64' (pen.); F. Baresi 79' (o.g.)	Report		Stadium: Stadio Olimpico; Attendance: 49,723; Referee: Graziano Cesari

26 February 1995 21	Parma	2–0	Lazio	Parma
	Asprilla 11', 52'	Report		Stadium: Stadio Ennio Tardini; Attendance: 23,177; Referee: Pierluigi Collina

5 March 1995 22	Lazio	8–2	Fiorentina	Rome
	Casiraghi 4', 49', 82', 89' (pen.); Negro 30'; Cravero 36' (pen.); Bokšić 57'; Di Vaio 86'	Report	Rui Costa 60'; Batistuta 74' (pen.)	Stadium: Stadio Olimpico; Attendance: 43,488; Referee: Fiorenzo Treossi

12 March 1995 23	Napoli	3–2	Lazio	Naples
	Rincón 49', 56'; Buso 87'	Report	Casiraghi 4', 49'	Stadium: Stadio San Paolo; Attendance: 32,320; Referee: Loris Stafoggia

19 March 1995 24	Lazio	4–0	Genoa	Rome
	Bacci 10'; Chamot 19'; Fuser 44'; Di Vaio 56'	Report		Stadium: Stadio Olimpico; Attendance: 38,477; Referee: Piero Ceccarini

2 April 1995 25	Cremonese	0–0	Lazio	Cremona
		Report		Stadium: Stadio Giovanni Zini; Attendance: 8,563; Referee: Roberto Bettin

9 April 1995 26	Lazio	2–0	Reggiana	Rome
	Rambaudi 53'; Signori 76'	Report		Stadium: Stadio Olimpico; Attendance: 46,372; Referee: Domenico Messina

15 April 1995 27	Padova	2–0	Lazio	Padua
	Cravero 43' (o.g.); Kreek 89'	Report		Stadium: Stadio Euganeo; Attendance: 13,654; Referee: Pasquale Rodomonti

23 April 1995 28	Roma	0–2	Lazio	Rome
		Report	Casiraghi 30'; Signori 71' (pen.)	Stadium: Stadio Olimpico; Attendance: 73,893; Referee: Angelo Amendolia

30 April 1995 29	Lazio	0–0	Cagliari	Rome
		Report		Stadium: Stadio Olimpico; Attendance: 43,013; Referee: Graziano Cesari

7 May 1995 30	Juventus	0–3	Lazio	Turin
		Report	Di Matteo 72'; Bokšić 89'; Venturin 90'	Stadium: Stadio delle Alpi; Attendance: 45,189; Referee: Marcello Nicchi

14 May 1995 31	Lazio	4–1	Internazionale	Rome
	Signori 35' (pen.); Negro 38'; Rambaudi 72'; Winter 90'	Report		Stadium: Stadio Olimpico; Attendance: 49,823; Referee: Fiorenzo Treossi

21 May 1995 32	Lazio	1–0	Sampdoria	Rome
	Winter 81'	Report		Stadium: Stadio Olimpico; Attendance: 43,991; Referee: Salvatore Racalbuto

28 May 1995 33	Foggia	0–1	Lazio	Foggia
		Report	Signori 36'	Stadium: Stadio Pino Zaccheria; Attendance: 11,608; Referee: Virginio Quartuccio

4 June 1995 34	Lazio	1–0	Brescia	Rome
	Colucci 90'	Report		Stadium: Stadio Olimpico; Attendance: 55,788; Referee: Carlo Dinelli

=== Coppa Italia ===
==== Second round ====
30 August 1994 First leg	Lazio	5–0	Modena	Rome
	Negro 21'; Bandieri 40' (o.g.); Signori 47', 70'; Casiraghi 84'			Stadium: Stadio Olimpico; Attendance: 25,000; Referee: Giacinto Franceschini

21 September 1994 Second leg	Modena	1–4 (1–9 agg.)	Lazio	Modena
	Landini 35'		Fuser 18'; Doll 59', 63'; Ballanti 84' (o.g.)	Stadium: Stadio Alberto Braglia; Attendance: 1,000; Referee: Alberto Gronda

==== Round of 16 ====
12 October 1994 First leg	Lazio	3–2	Piacenza	Rome
	Casiraghi 23', 71'; Cravero 88'		F. Inzaghi 18'; Piovani 45'	Stadium: Stadio Olimpico; Attendance: 15,000; Referee: Pasquale Rodomonti

26 October 1994 Second leg	Piacenza	2–3 (4–6 agg.)	Lazio	Piacenza
	Turrini 10'; Winter 25' (o.g.)		Cravero 62'; Negro 65'; Signori 73'	Stadium: Stadio Galleana; Attendance: 15,000; Referee: Graziano Cesari

==== Quarter-finals ====
29 November 1994 First leg	Lazio	1–0	Napoli	Rome
	Winter 29'			Stadium: Stadio Olimpico; Attendance: 8,000; Referee: Marcello Nicchi

14 December 1994 Second leg	Napoli	1–2 (1–3 agg.)	Lazio	Naples
	Lerda 42'		Negro 49'; Signori 89'	Stadium: Stadio San Paolo; Attendance: 19,814; Referee: Loris Stafoggia

==== Semi-finals ====
8 March 1995 First leg	Lazio	0–1	Juventus	Rome
			Ravanelli 84'	Stadium: Stadio Olimpico; Attendance: 68,156; Referee: Marcello Nicchi

11 April 1995 Second leg	Juventus	2–1 (3–1 agg.)	Lazio	Turin
	Marocchi 47'; R. Baggio 90+1' (pen.)		Sousa 14' (o.g.)	Stadium: Stadio Delle Alpi; Attendance: 10,900; Referee: Stefano Braschi

=== UEFA Cup ===
==== First round ====
13 September 1994 First leg	Dinamo Minsk (Belarus)	0–0	(Italy) Lazio	Minsk, Belarus
18:30 CEST (UTC+02:00)		Report		Stadium: Dinamo Stadium; Attendance: 15,000; Referee: Marnix Sandra (Belgium)

27 September 1994 Second leg	Lazio (Italy)	4–1 (4–1 agg.)	(Belarus) Dinamo Minsk	Rome, Italy
20:30 CEST (UTC+02:00)	Astrowski 45' (o.g.); Favalli 61'; Bokšić 74'; Fuser 84'	Report	Kachura 9'	Stadium: Stadio Olimpico; Attendance: 33,850; Referee: José María García-Aranda (Spain)

==== Second round ====
18 October 1994 First leg	Trelleborg (Sweden)	0–0	(Italy) Lazio	Trelleborg, Sweden
20:00 CEST (UTC+02:00)		Report		Stadium: Vångavallen; Attendance: 7,303; Referee: Zbigniew Przesmycki (Poland)

1 November 1994 Second leg	Lazio (Italy)	1–0 (1–0 agg.)	(Sweden) Trelleborg	Rome, Italy
19:30 CET (UTC+01:00)	Bokšić 90'	Report		Stadium: Stadio Olimpico; Attendance: 36,784; Referee: Karol Ihring (Slovakia)

==== Third round ====
22 November 1994 First leg	Trabzonspor (Turkey)	1–2	(Italy) Lazio	Trabzon, Turkey
18:30 CET (UTC+01:00)	Ünal 68'	Report	Rambaudi 60'; Negro 62'	Stadium: Hüseyin Avni Aker Stadium; Attendance: 22,500; Referee: Antonio López Nieto (Spain)

6 December 1994 Second leg	Lazio (Italy)	2–1 (4–2 agg.)	(Turkey) Trabzonspor	Rome, Italy
20:30 CET (UTC+01:00)	Cravero 25'; Di Vaio 75'	Report	Mandıralı 74'	Stadium: Stadio Olimpico; Attendance: 24,887; Referee: Bernd Heynemann (Germany)

==== Quarter-finals ====
28 February 1995 First leg	Lazio (Italy)	1–0	(Germany) Borussia Dortmund	Rome, Italy
21:00 CET (UTC+01:00)	Freund 69' (o.g.)	Report		Stadium: Stadio Olimpico; Attendance: 54,000; Referee: Jaap Uilenberg (Netherlands)

14 March 1995 Second leg	Borussia Dortmund (Germany)	2–0 (2–1 agg.)	(Italy) Lazio	Dortmund, Germany
19:45 CET (UTC+01:00)	Chapuisat 11' (pen.); Riedle 90'	Report		Stadium: Westfalenstadion; Attendance: 35,400; Referee: László Vágner (Hungary)

== Statistics ==
=== Players statistics ===
No.	Pos	Nat	Player	Total		Serie A		Coppa		UEFA	
No.	Pos	Nat	Player	Apps	Goals	Apps	Goals	Apps	Goals	Apps	Goals
	GK	(Italy) ITA	Marchegiani	48	-47	33	-34	7	-8	8	-5
	DF	(Italy) ITA	Negro	48	8	32	4	8	3	8	1
	DF	(Argentina) ARG	Chamot	43	1	28	1	7	0	8	0
	DF	(Italy) ITA	Cravero	37	5	22+1	2	7	2	7	1
	DF	(Italy) ITA	Favalli	32	1	22	0	5	0	5	1
	MF	(Italy) ITA	Fuser	45	7	30+2	5	6	1	7	1
	MF	(Netherlands) NED	Winter	43	6	29	5	6	1	8	0
	MF	(Switzerland) SUI	Di Matteo	42	1	28	1	8	0	6	0
	FW	(Croatia) CRO	Boksic	33	11	23	9	4	0	6	2
	FW	(Italy) ITA	Signori	39	21	26+1	17	5	4	7	0
	FW	(Italy) ITA	Rambaudi	46	5	31+1	4	7	0	7	1
	GK	(Italy) ITA	Orsi	2	-1	1	0	1	-1		
	FW	(Italy) ITA	Casiraghi	47	15	19+15	12	6	3	7	0
	DF	(Italy) ITA	Bergodi	32	1	19+5	1	5	0	3	0
	MF	(Italy) ITA	Venturin	33	1	14+8	1	6	0	5	0
	DF	(Italy) ITA	Nesta	12	0	7+4	0	1	0		
	DF	(Italy) ITA	Bacci	16	1	5+6	1	2	0	3	0
	MF	(England) ENG	Gascoigne	4	0	2+2	0				
	FW	(Italy) ITA	Di Vaio	13	4	1+7	3	4	0	1	1
	DF	(Italy) ITA	Bonomi	7	0	1+5	0	1	0		
	MF	(Italy) ITA	Colucci	3	1	1+1	1	1	0		
	MF	(Italy) ITA	Della Morte	2	0	0	0	2	0		
	MF	(Italy) ITA	De Sio	1	0	0+1	0				
	MF	(Germany) GER	Doll	2	2	0	0	2	2		
	DF	(Italy) ITA	Adani	1	0	0	0	1	0	-	-
	GK	(Italy) ITA	Roma								

- Source: http://calcio-seriea.net/presenze/1994/1071/

=== Top scorers ===
- (Italy) Giuseppe Signori 17 (3)
- (Italy) Pierluigi Casiraghi 11 (1)
- (Croatia) Alen Bokšić 9
- (Italy) Diego Fuser 5
- (Netherlands) Aron Winter 5
