= Onofrio Barone =

Italian football coach and former player

Personal information
- Date of birth: 4 July 1964 (age 62)
- Place of birth: Palermo, Italy
- Height: 1.68 m (5 ft 6 in)
- Position: Midfielder

Youth career
- Palermo

Senior career*
Years	Team	Apps	(Gls)
1981–1986	Palermo	91	(4)
1986–1987	Messina	0	(0)
1987–1992	Foggia	164	(17)
1992–1995	Bari	90	(5)
1995–1996	Verona	34	(2)
1996–1997	Lucchese	28	(3)
1997–1998	Palermo	20	(3)
1998–2000	Trapani	55	(2)
2000–2001	Puteolana	28	(0)
2001–2002	Campobasso	27	(1)
2002–2003	Nocerina	33	(2)
2003–2005	Casertana	47	(4)
2005–2006	Carini	?	(?)

Managerial career
- 2009–2010: Ibiza-Eivissa
- * Club domestic league appearances and goals as of 21:41, 6 September 2011 (UTC)

Onofrio Barone (born 4 July 1964) is an Italian football coach and former player.

== Playing career ==
Barone started his career at hometown club Palermo, a club he left in 1986 after it went bankrupt. He then joined Foggia in 1987 after a single negative season at Messina, and played 164 games in five seasons at the club, with whom he made his Serie A debut under the tenure of Zdeněk Zeman. In 1992, he joined Bari, with whom he enjoyed a promotion to Serie A in his first season and another taste of top-flight in 1993–94. He then won a personal third promotion to Serie A with Verona in 1996, but only played at the Serie B level and lower since then. This was then followed by a number of footballing seasons with several other teams, mostly from Southern Italy, including a comeback stint at Palermo under head coach Ignazio Arcoleo. Barone retired in 2006 after playing a single season at Eccellenza Sicily club Carini, then coached by his friend and former Palermo teammate Rosario Compagno.

== Coaching career ==
In 2007, Barone returned to Bari as assistant to head coach Giuseppe Materazzi. In July 2009, he was appointed head coach of Tercera División club Ibiza-Eivissa after recommendation of Materazzi himself, who was serving as managing director at the time; he however left by the end of the season after the club went bankrupt.

In July 2011 he was announced as new member of the Palermo youth coaching staff, working initially as assistant to Under-20 youth coach Devis Mangia. On 31 August 2011, following Mangia's appointment as new Palermo caretaker, Barone was assigned first team duties too.

He successively followed Mangia after the latter's appointment as the new head coach of the Italy national under-21 football team between 2012 and 2013. He successively made a brief comeback at Palermo as part of the youth team during the 2018–19 season.
