= Francesco Mancini (footballer, born 1968) =

Italian footballer (1968–2012)

Personal information
- Date of birth: 10 October 1968
- Place of birth: Matera, Italy
- Date of death: 30 March 2012 (aged 43)
- Place of death: Pescara, Italy
- Height: 1.78 m (5 ft 10 in)
- Position: Goalkeeper

Youth career
- 1984–1985: Matera

Senior career*
Years	Team	Apps	(Gls)
1985–1987	Matera	57	(0)
1987	Bisceglie	0	(0)
1987–1997	Foggia	235	(0)
1995–1996	→ Lazio (loan)	6	(0)
1997–2000	Bari	95	(0)
2000–2003	Napoli	82	(0)
2003–2004	Pisa	38	(0)
2005	Sambenedettese	14	(0)
2005–2006	Teramo	32	(0)
2006–2007	Salernitana	18	(0)
2007–2008	Martina Franca	14	(0)

Managerial career
- 2009–2010: Manfredonia (goalkeeping coach)
- 2010–2011: Foggia (goalkeeping coach)
- 2011–2012: Pescara (goalkeeping coach)
- * Club domestic league appearances and goals

Francesco Mancini (10 October 1968 – 30 March 2012) was an Italian football player and coach. A goalkeeper, he spent most of his career with Foggia during the 1990s.

== Career ==
=== Early career ===
Mancini started his career at hometown club Matera in 1985. He later played for Bisceglie in 1987.

=== Foggia ===
Mancini joined Foggia in 1987 and remained with the club for a decade. He helped the club achieve Serie A promotion under manager Zdeněk Zeman, winning the 1990–91 Serie B title.

He played two Serie B games for Foggia in the 1995–96 season, before leaving on loan for Lazio in November 1995.

He returned to Foggia in the summer of 1996 and played another Serie B season with the club.

=== Bari ===
In summer 1997, he joined A.S. Bari of Serie A, where he played 95 games in three Serie A seasons.

=== Napoli ===
In October 2000, he transferred to Napoli of Serie A, to replace young keeper Ferdinando Coppola who had been sold to Bologna. His first-choice place was lost to new signing Alberto Fontana in January 2001, however. He regained his first-choice spot following Napoli's relegation to Serie B. In the 2002–03 season, despite the presence of backup goalkeeper Marco Storari and subsequently Emanuele Manitta, he still made 27 appearances at the age of 35.

=== Late career ===
In summer 2003, he joined Pisa of Serie C1 as Napoli chose to sign Manitta permanently.

In January 2005, he transferred to Sambenedettese of Serie C1, in exchange for Domenico Di Dio.

He then played for Teramo, Salernitana and A.C. Martina, all in Serie C1.

== Post-playing career ==
During the 2009–10 season, he worked as the goalkeeping coach and the assistant coach of Manfredonia, who were playing in the Lega Pro Seconda Divisione league.

In July 2010, he was appointed the new goalkeeping coach of his former club Foggia, where he worked as part of the backroom staff of his mentor Zdeněk Zeman. Later on, in July 2011, he followed Zeman to Serie B club Pescara.

== Death ==
On 30 March 2012, 43-year-old Mancini was found dead at his Pescara home by his wife after suffering a sudden heart attack.

== Honours ==
Foggia

- Serie B: 1990–91
