= Antonio Criniti =

Italian footballer (born 1970)

Personal information
- Date of birth: 29 October 1970 (age 56)
- Place of birth: Pinerolo
- Position: Midfielder

Senior career*
Years	Team	Apps	(Gls)
1987–1991	Catanzaro		
1991–1994	Cagliari		
1994–1995	Palermo		
1995–1996	Avellino		
1996	Brescia		
1997	Reggina		
1997	Brescia		
1998	Avellino		
1998–2000	Triestina		
2000	Vis Pesaro		
2000–2001	Catania		
2002	Sambenedettese		
2002	Perugia		
2003	Sambenedettese		
2004	Cisco Lodigiani		
2005	Varese		
- * Club domestic league appearances and goals

Antonio Criniti (born 29 October 1970) is a retired Italian football striker.
