= 1991–92 Serie C1 =

Italian football league season

The 1991–92 Serie C1 was the 14th season of Serie C1, the third tier of Italian football, which is now known as Serie C.

== Rules ==
Following the reduction of the Serie C2, relegations were reduced from four to three clubs per group.

== Group A (North) ==
	Classifica	Pt
1.	SPAL (P)	47
2.	MONZA (P)	45
3.	Como	43
4.	Vicenza	40
5.	Empoli	39
6.	Triestina	37
7.	Chievo	34
8.	Spezia	33
9.	Carpi	32
9.	Palazzolo	32
11.	Arezzo	31
11.	Alessandria	31
11.	Siena	31
14.	Massese	30
15.	Pro Sesto	29
16.	Casale (R)	29
17.	Pavia (R)	25
18.	Baracca Lugo (R)	24

== Group B (South) ==
	Classifica	Pt
1.	TERNANA	44
2.	FIDELIS ANDRIA	41
3.	Perugia	40
4.	Giarre	37
5.	Ischia Isolaverde	34
5.	Catania	34
5.	Salernitana	34
8.	Casarano	33
8.	Nola	33
8.	Reggina	33
8.	Sambenedettese	33
12.	Chieti	32
12.	Acireale	32
12.	Barletta	32
15.	Siracusa	31
16.	Fano	30
17.	Monopoli	25
18.	Licata	34

== References and sources ==
- Almanacco Illustrato del Calcio - La Storia 1898-2004, Panini Edizioni, Modena, September 2005

Specific
