= Alessandro Romano (footballer, born 1969) =

Italian footballer (born 1969)

Personal information
- Date of birth: 30 September 1969 (age 57)
- Place of birth: Rome, Italy
- Height: 1.78 m (5 ft 10 in)
- Position: Defender

Senior career*
Years	Team	Apps	(Gls)
1984–1985	Lodigiani	0	(0)
1985–1988	Napoli	0	(0)
1988–1990	Trento	29	(0)
1990–1994	Monza	124	(4)
1994–1995	Cesena	33	(2)
1995–1996	Lazio	7	(0)
1996–1997	Brescia	30	(0)
1997–1998	Genoa	20	(0)
1998	Brescia	1	(0)
1998–1999	Cesena	40	(0)
2000	Verona	1	(0)
2000–2002	Dundee	37	(0)
- * Club domestic league appearances and goals

Alessandro Romano (born 30 September 1969) is a retired Italian professional footballer who played as a defender.
