= Carlos Richetti =

Italian baseball player (born 1983)

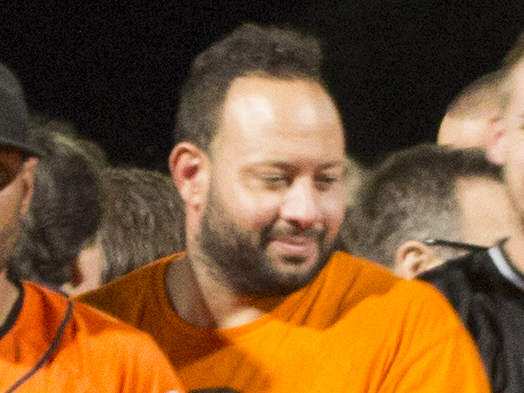
- Richetti in 2015
- Pitcher
- Born: 23 August 1983 (age 43)
- Bats: Right Throws: Right
Medals
Men's baseball
Representing Italy
European Baseball Championship
Gold medal – first place	2010 Germany	National team

Carlos Manuel Richetti (born 23 August 1983) is an Italian baseball player who competed in the 2004 Summer Olympics.

As a member of Italy national baseball team he won two European Baseball Championships, in 2010 and in 2012.
