= Roberto Rambaudi =

Italian football manager (born 1966)

Personal information
- Date of birth: 12 January 1966 (age 60)
- Place of birth: Moncalieri, Italy
- Height: 1.79 m (5 ft 10 in)
- Position: Midfielder

Senior career*
Years	Team	Apps	(Gls)
1984–1985	Torino	0	(0)
1985–1986	Omegna	29	(4)
1986–1988	Pavia	61	(18)
1988–1989	Perugia	28	(8)
1989–1992	Foggia	107	(31)
1992–1994	Atalanta	57	(8)
1994–1998	Lazio	109	(13)
1998–1999	Genoa	7	(0)
1999–2000	Treviso	13	(0)
Total		411	(82)

International career
1994	Italy	2	(0)

Managerial career
- 2004: Latina
- 2007–2008: Viterbese
- 2013–2015: Astrea
- 2016–2019: Luiss
- 2020: Atletico Lodigiani
- 2021: Flaminia
- 2023: Legnano
- * Club domestic league appearances and goals

Roberto Rambaudi (Italian pronunciation: [roˈbɛrto ramˈbaudi]; born 12 January 1966) is an Italian professional football coach and a former player, who played as a forward or midfielder in the position of right winger.

== Club career ==
Rambaudi gained Serie A promotion with Foggia after winning the 1990–91 Serie B title, forming a notable attacking trio with Giuseppe Signori and Francesco Baiano, helping the team to a ninth-place finish in Serie A during the 1991–92 season under manager Zdeněk Zeman. He later moved to Atalanta during summer 1992, where he remained for two seasons. After the club were relegated in 1994, he moved to Lazio, alongside his former manager Zeman, where he put on notable performances, and was called up to the Italy national team. He later moved to Serie B sides Genoa, and later Treviso, before ending his career in 2000 in Serie B. Overall throughout his 16-year club career, he made 411 appearances, scoring 82 goals, between 1984 and 2000.

== International career ==
Rambaudi also earned two caps for Italy in 1994 under manager Arrigo Sacchi, making his international debut in a 2–0 away victory over Estonia, in an UEFA Euro 1996 qualification match.

== After retirement ==
After retiring, Rambaudi worked as a coach, firstly with the Lazio Youth squad in 2003, and later moving to coach Latina the following season. However, he was sacked after only a few matches by Sciaretta. He signed a contract with Viterbese for the 2007–08 season, although he could not help the club avoid relegation.

He later worked as a football pundit for Dahlia TV, and subsequently Mediaset Premium.

On 3 March 2021, he was hired as head coach of Serie D club Flaminia. He left the club in October 2021 after a poor start to the season.

On 10 October 2023, Rambaudi was announced as the new head coach of Serie D club Legnano, only to leave them by mutual consent after just a single game in charge.

== Honours ==
Foggia

- Serie B: 1990–91.

Lazio

- Coppa Italia: 1997–98.
- Supercoppa Italiana: 1998.
