= Francesco Baiano =

Italian footballer (born 1968)

Personal information
- Date of birth: 24 February 1968 (age 58)
- Place of birth: Naples, Italy
- Height: 1.70 m (5 ft 7 in)
- Position: Striker

Team information
- Current team: Poggibonsi (head coach)

Youth career
- Napoli

Senior career*
Years	Team	Apps	(Gls)
1984–1990	Napoli	5	(0)
1986–1987	→ Empoli	26	(2)
1987–1988	→ Parma	25	(4)
1988–1989	→ Empoli	38	(14)
1989–1990	→ Avellino	32	(6)
1990–1992	Foggia	69	(38)
1992–1997	Fiorentina	118	(29)
1997–1999	Derby County	64	(16)
2000	Ternana	15	(1)
2000–2002	Pistoiese	58	(22)
2002–2008	Sangiovannese	96	(33)
2008–2009	Sansovino	0	(0)
Total		546	(165)

International career
1991	Italy	2	(0)

Managerial career
- 2007–2008: Sangiovannese (technique coach)
- 2008–2009: Sansovino (player-manager)
- 2010–2011: Varese (assistant)
- 2011–2012: Siena (assistant)
- 2012: Palermo (assistant)
- 2013: Palermo (assistant)
- 2013: ChievoVerona (assistant)
- 2014–2015: Scandicci
- 2016–2017: Varese
- 2022–2023: Aglianese
- 2023–2024: Aglianese
- 2025–: Poggibonsi
- * Club domestic league appearances and goals

Francesco Baiano (Italian pronunciation: [franˈtʃesko baˈjaːno]; born 24 February 1968) is an Italian football coach and former player, currently in charge of Serie D club Poggibonsi. He played as a striker for several Italian clubs throughout his playing career, and he also played for Derby County in the Premier League, between 1997 and 1999.

== Club career ==
Baiano was born in Naples. During his career, he played for several clubs. He first made his name with Foggia under Zdeněk Zeman, earning promotion to Serie A after winning the 1990–91 Serie B title, also winning the top-scorer award, with 22 goals, and forming a notable attacking trio alongside Giuseppe Signori and Roberto Rambaudi. He also played for Fiorentina, where he was a part of the so-called Ba-Ba strikers duo together with Gabriel Batistuta (he scored 29 goals in 118 games for Fiorentina), winning the 1995–96 Coppa Italia and the 1996 Supercoppa Italiana. During the 1992–93 Serie A season, he was the joint top assist provider in the league, with 12 assists, alongside Gianfranco Zola.

Baiano later joined Derby County in 1997, along with compatriot Stefano Eranio; together, they were among the first group of Italian footballers to play in the Premier League. He hit 16 goals in 64 games in a resurgent Derby team and was named as one of their best ever imports by the fans.

Baiano went on to play for Sangiovannese of Serie C1, a team he joined in 2002 to leave only in 2008 after a string of successful seasons with the small Tuscan side.

== International career ==
Baiano won two international caps for Italy, both in late 1991, under Arrigo Sacchi, although he failed to score a goal at international level. He made his debut on 13 November 1991 in Genoa, in a 1–1 draw against Norway.

== Style of play ==
A well-known, diminutive forward famous for his shooting technique and eye for goal, Baiano was also a quick, energetic, and dynamic player, with good technical ability and close control in tight spaces. Due to his pace, mobility, and agility, he was also often used as an outside forward; during his later career, he often played in a more creative role, as a supporting striker, or as an attacking midfielder, due to his creativity, as well as his ability to play off of teammates and provide them with assists.

== Coaching career ==
In 2008, Baiano was appointed player/manager of Serie D club Sansovino with little success, leaving the club at the end of the season. In 2010, he re-joined his former boss Giuseppe Sannino, becoming his main assistant at Serie B club Varese. In 2011, he followed Sannino at Serie A club Siena, and then at Palermo in 2012. He was removed as Palermo assistant together with head coach Sannino on 16 September 2012.

== Honours ==
Fiorentina

- Serie B: 1993–94
- Coppa Italia: 1995–96
- Supercoppa Italiana: 1996

Foggia

- Serie B: 1990–91

Individual

- Serie B top scorer: 1990–91 (22 goals)
- Serie A top assist provider: 1992–93
- Derby County F.C. Player of the Year: 1998
