= 1991–92 Serie A =

90th season of top-tier Italian football

Serie A
- Season: 1991–92
- Dates: 1 September 1991 – 24 May 1992
- Champions: Milan; 12th title
- Relegated: Bari; Hellas Verona; Cremonese; Ascoli
- European Cup: Milan
- Cup Winners' Cup: Parma
- UEFA Cup: Juventus; Torino; Napoli; Roma
- Matches: 306
- Goals: 695 (2.27 per match)
- Top goalscorer: Marco van Basten (25 goals)

1991–92 Serie A team distribution

During the 1991–92 Serie A, under the guidance of Fabio Capello, Milan completed a remarkable unbeaten season, a run that eventually totalled 58 games. They finished eight points ahead of Serie A runners-up Juventus. However, it was a disappointing season for Internazionale, who could only manage an eighth-place finish, meaning that 1992–93 would bring no European action for them — something which had been a rare occurrence over the last three decades. Defending champions Sampdoria finished sixth and their last chance of European action for the following season was lost when they were beaten by the Spanish champions Barcelona in the final of the European Cup. Bari, Hellas Verona (the 1985 champions), Cremonese and Ascoli were all relegated.

== Teams ==
Foggia, Hellas Verona, Cremonese and Ascoli had been promoted from Serie B.

== Personnel and Sponsoring ==
| Team | Head Coach | Kit manufacturer | Shirt sponsor |
|---|---|---|---|
| Ascoli | (Italy) Massimo Cacciatori | Ennerre | IMESA |
| Atalanta | (Italy) Bruno Giorgi | Lotto | Tamoil |
| Bari | (Poland) Zbigniew Boniek | Adidas | Sud Factoring |
| Cagliari | (Italy) Carlo Mazzone | Umbro | Formaggi Ovini Sardi |
| Cremonese | (Italy) Gustavo Giagnoni | Patrick | Andreotti Costruzioni |
| Fiorentina | (Italy) Luigi Radice | Lotto | Giocheria |
| Foggia | (Czech Republic) Zdeněk Zeman | Admiral | Banca Pescopagano |
| Genoa | (Italy) Osvaldo Bagnoli | Erreà | Mita |
| Internazionale | (Spain) Luis Suárez | Umbro | FitGar |
| Juventus | (Italy) Giovanni Trapattoni | Kappa | UPIM |
| Lazio | (Italy) Dino Zoff | Umbro | Banco di Santo Spirito |
| Milan | (Italy) Fabio Capello | Adidas | Mediolanum |
| Napoli | (Italy) Claudio Ranieri | Umbro | Voiello |
| Parma | (Italy) Nevio Scala | Umbro | Parmalat |
| Roma | (Italy) Ottavio Bianchi | Adidas | Barilla |
| Sampdoria | (Socialist Federal Republic of Yugoslavia) Vujadin Boškov | Asics | Erg |
| Torino | (Italy) Emiliano Mondonico | ABM | Fratelli Beretta |
| Hellas Verona | (Italy) Mario Corso | Uhlsport | Pastificio Rana |

== League table ==
| Pos | Team | Pld | W | D | L | GF | GA | GD | Pts | Qualification or relegation |
|---|---|---|---|---|---|---|---|---|---|---|
| 1 | Milan (C) | 34 | 22 | 12 | 0 | 74 | 21 | +53 | 56 | Qualification to European Cup |
| 2 | Juventus | 34 | 18 | 12 | 4 | 45 | 22 | +23 | 48 | Qualification to UEFA Cup |
| 3 | Torino | 34 | 14 | 15 | 5 | 42 | 20 | +22 | 43 | Qualification to UEFA Cup |
| 4 | Napoli | 34 | 15 | 12 | 7 | 56 | 40 | +16 | 42 | Qualification to UEFA Cup |
| 5 | Roma | 34 | 13 | 14 | 7 | 37 | 31 | +6 | 40 | Qualification to UEFA Cup |
| 6 | Sampdoria | 34 | 11 | 16 | 7 | 38 | 31 | +7 | 38 | |
| 7 | Parma | 34 | 11 | 16 | 7 | 32 | 28 | +4 | 38 | Qualification to Cup Winners' Cup |
| 8 | Internazionale | 34 | 10 | 17 | 7 | 28 | 28 | 0 | 37 | |
| 9 | Foggia | 34 | 12 | 11 | 11 | 58 | 58 | 0 | 35 | |
| 10 | Lazio | 34 | 11 | 12 | 11 | 43 | 40 | +3 | 34 | |
| 11 | Atalanta | 34 | 10 | 14 | 10 | 31 | 33 | −2 | 34 | |
| 12 | Fiorentina | 34 | 10 | 12 | 12 | 44 | 41 | +3 | 32 | |
| 13 | Cagliari | 34 | 7 | 15 | 12 | 30 | 34 | −4 | 29 | |
| 14 | Genoa | 34 | 9 | 11 | 14 | 35 | 47 | −12 | 29 | |
| 15 | Bari (R) | 34 | 6 | 10 | 18 | 26 | 47 | −21 | 22 | Relegation to Serie B |
| 16 | Hellas Verona (R) | 34 | 7 | 7 | 20 | 24 | 57 | −33 | 21 | Relegation to Serie B |
| 17 | Cremonese (R) | 34 | 5 | 10 | 19 | 27 | 49 | −22 | 20 | Relegation to Serie B |
| 18 | Ascoli (R) | 34 | 4 | 6 | 24 | 25 | 68 | −43 | 14 | Relegation to Serie B |

Source: 1991–92 Serie A, RSSSF.com
Rules for classification: 1) Points; 2) Head-to-head points; 3) Head-to-head goal difference; 4) Goal difference; 5) Goals scored; 6) Draw.
(C) Champions; (R) Relegated

== Results ==
| Home \ Away | ASC | ATA | BAR | CAG | CRE | FIO | FOG | GEN | INT | JUV | LAZ | MIL | NAP | PAR | ROM | SAM | TOR | VER |
|---|---|---|---|---|---|---|---|---|---|---|---|---|---|---|---|---|---|---|
| Ascoli | — | 1–0 | 2–2 | 1–3 | 1–0 | 0–0 | 2–1 | 0–2 | 1–2 | 0–2 | 1–4 | 0–1 | 1–4 | 2–3 | 1–1 | 0–1 | 0–4 | 1–1 |
| Atalanta | 1–1 (Note: The match was played at Stadio Brianteo.) | — | 2–1 | 0–1 | 1–1 | 1–0 | 4–4 | 1–0 | 1–0 | 0–0 | 1–0 | 0–2 | 1–1 | 0–1 | 0–1 | 0–0 | 1–3 | 0–0 |
| Bari | 2–1 | 0–0 | — | 1–0 | 0–0 | 1–0 | 1–3 | 1–2 | 0–2 | 0–0 | 1–2 | 0–1 | 1–3 | 1–1 | 2–1 | 1–1 | 1–1 | 2–1 |
| Cagliari | 2–0 | 0–0 | 0–0 | — | 0–0 | 4–0 | 2–2 | 1–1 | 1–1 | 1–1 | 0–1 | 1–4 | 0–0 | 0–0 | 0–1 | 3–2 | 0–1 | 4–0 |
| Cremonese | 3–1 | 1–2 | 1–1 | 0–1 | — | 1–3 | 0–2 | 2–1 | 0–1 | 0–2 | 2–0 | 1–1 | 0–0 | 0–1 | 1–2 | 0–1 | 0–2 | 3–0 |
| Fiorentina | 1–2 | 3–0 | 2–0 | 1–0 | 1–1 | — | 1–2 | 3–1 | 1–1 | 2–0 | 1–1 | 0–0 | 4–2 | 1–1 | 0–1 | 1–2 | 0–0 | 4–1 |
| Foggia | 1–0 | 2–3 | 4–1 | 3–1 | 2–0 | 3–3 | — | 1–0 | 2–2 | 0–1 (Note: The match was played at Stadio San Nicola.) | 2–1 | 2–8 | 1–0 | 1–1 | 1–2 | 0–0 | 1–1 | 5–0 |
| Genoa | 1–0 | 0–2 | 1–3 | 2–2 | 2–0 | 3–2 | 0–2 | — | 1–2 | 2–1 | 1–0 | 0–0 | 3–4 | 2–0 | 1–1 | 0–0 | 1–1 | 1–0 |
| Internazionale | 2–1 | 0–0 | 1–0 | 0–0 | 0–2 | 1–1 | 1–1 | 2–2 | — | 1–3 | 1–0 | 1–1 | 0–0 | 0–0 | 0–0 | 0–0 | 0–0 | 2–0 |
| Juventus | 1–0 | 2–1 | 2–0 | 0–0 | 2–0 | 1–0 | 4–1 | 3–0 | 2–1 | — | 1–1 | 1–1 | 3–1 | 1–0 | 2–1 | 0–0 | 1–0 | 2–0 |
| Lazio | 1–1 | 1–1 | 3–1 | 2–1 | 3–2 | 1–1 | 5–2 | 1–1 | 0–1 | 1–1 | — | 1–1 | 3–3 | 1–1 | 1–1 | 1–2 | 2–1 | 2–0 |
| Milan | 4–1 | 3–1 | 2–0 | 1–0 | 3–1 | 1–1 | 3–1 | 1–1 | 1–0 | 1–1 | 2–0 | — | 5–0 | 2–0 | 4–1 | 5–1 | 2–0 | 4–0 |
| Napoli | 5–1 | 1–0 | 1–0 | 4–0 | 3–0 | 1–0 | 3–3 | 1–0 | 1–1 | 0–1 | 3–0 | 1–1 | — | 2–2 | 3–2 | 2–1 | 0–1 | 3–1 |
| Parma | 2–0 | 0–0 | 1–0 | 1–1 | 1–1 | 1–1 | 2–0 | 2–0 | 1–1 | 0–0 | 1–0 | 1–3 | 2–1 | — | 3–1 | 2–1 | 0–0 | 1–1 |
| Roma | 1–0 | 1–1 | 2–0 | 0–0 | 3–0 | 1–3 | 1–1 | 0–0 | 0–1 | 1–1 | 1–1 | 1–1 | 1–1 | 1–0 | — | 2–0 | 1–0 | 1–0 |
| Sampdoria | 4–0 | 0–2 | 1–1 | 1–1 | 2–2 | 2–0 | 1–1 | 2–2 | 4–0 | 1–0 | 1–0 | 0–2 | 1–1 | 2–0 | 1–1 | — | 0–0 | 2–0 |
| Torino | 5–2 | 1–1 | 1–0 | 1–0 | 2–0 | 2–0 | 3–1 | 4–0 | 0–0 | 2–0 | 0–1 | 2–2 | 0–0 | 0–0 | 1–1 | 1–1 | — | 0–0 |
| Hellas Verona | 1–0 | 1–3 | 2–1 | 2–0 | 2–2 | 2–3 | 1–0 | 2–1 | 1–0 | 3–3 | 0–2 | 0–1 | 0–1 (Note: The match was played at Stadio Giovanni Zini.) | 1–0 | 0–1 | 0–0 | 1–2 | — |

Legend: Blue = home team win; Yellow = draw; Red = away team win.

== Top goalscorers ==
| Rank | Player | Club | Goals |
|---|---|---|---|
| 1 | (Netherlands) Marco van Basten | Milan | 25 |
| 2 | (Italy) Roberto Baggio | Juventus | 18 |
| 3 | (Italy) Francesco Baiano | Foggia | 16 |
| 4 | (Brazil) Careca | Napoli | 15 |
| 5 | (Argentina) Gabriel Batistuta | Fiorentina | 13 |
| 5 | (Germany) Karl-Heinz Riedle | Lazio | 13 |
| 5 | (Uruguay) Rubén Sosa | Lazio | 13 |
| 8 | (Italy) Gianfranco Zola | Napoli | 12 |
| 9 | (England) David Platt | Bari | 11 |
| 9 | (Italy) Giuseppe Signori | Foggia | 11 |
| 9 | (Czechoslovakia) Tomáš Skuhravý | Genoa | 11 |
| 9 | (Italy) Gianluca Vialli | Sampdoria | 11 |

== Season tickets ==
The season ticket sales as they were before the beginning of the season:

Source: Statistiche Spettatori Serie A 1991-1992

| Rank | Club | Tickets |
|---|---|---|
| 1 | Milan | 60,048 |
| 2 | Juventus | 36,384 |
| 3 | Roma | 33,277 |
| 4 | Torino | 26,060 |
| 5 | Inter | 33.588 |
| 6 | Torino | 26.060 |
| 7 | Napoli | 25,215 |
| 8 | Sampdoria | 25,186 |
| 9 | Genoa | 23,125 |
| 10 | Lazio | 20,556 |
| 11 | Fiorentina | 20,203 |
| 12 | Parma | 17.180 |
| 13 | Cagliari | 13.773 |
| 14 | Verona | 13.176 |
| 15 | Foggia | 11.870 |
| 16 | Atalanta | 9.199 |
| 17 | Ascona | 4.554 |
| 18 | Cremonese | 3.063 |

== Attendances ==
| No. | Club | Average |
|---|---|---|
| 1 | AC Milan | 77,868 |
| 2 | Juventus | 51,832 |
| 3 | Roma | 51,609 |
| 4 | Internazionale | 48,783 |
| 5 | Napoli | 48,192 |
| 6 | Lazio | 39,499 |
| 7 | Bari | 35,796 |
| 8 | Torino | 35,364 |
| 9 | Sampdoria | 31,372 |
| 10 | Genoa | 31,063 |
| 11 | Fiorentina | 30,488 |
| 12 | Cagliari | 24,454 |
| 13 | Hellas Verona | 23,009 |
| 14 | Foggia | 22,470 |
| 15 | Parma | 21,553 |
| 16 | Atalanta | 20,240 |
| 17 | Ascoli | 11,190 |
| 18 | Cremonese | 10,896 |

== References and sources ==
- Almanacco Illustrato del Calcio - La Storia 1898-2004, Panini Edizioni, Modena, September 2005
