= Giuseppe Signori =

Italian footballer (born 1968)

Personal information
- Date of birth: 17 February 1968 (age 58)
- Place of birth: Alzano Lombardo, Italy
- Height: 1.70 m (5 ft 7 in)
- Positions: Striker; left winger

Youth career
- 1981–1984: Inter Milan

Senior career*
Years	Team	Apps	(Gls)
1984–1986	Leffe	38	(8)
1986–1989	Piacenza	46	(6)
1987–1988	→ Trento (loan)	31	(3)
1989–1992	Foggia	100	(37)
1992–1997	Lazio	152	(107)
1998	Sampdoria	17	(3)
1998–2004	Bologna	142	(66)
2004–2005	Iraklis	5	(0)
2005–2006	Sopron	10	(3)
Total		541	(230)

International career
1992–1995	Italy	28	(7)
Medal record
Representing Italy
FIFA World Cup
Runner-up	1994
- * Club domestic league appearances and goals

Giuseppe "Beppe" Signori (Italian pronunciation: [dʒuˈzɛppe siɲˈɲoːri]; born 17 February 1968) is an Italian former professional footballer who played as a forward.

He played for several clubs in Italy throughout his career, and also had spells in Greece and Hungary with Iraklis and MFC Sopron respectively. Signori won the Serie A top-scorer award three times and is one of the top ten scorers in Serie A history. At international level, Signori represented Italy 28 times between 1992 and 1995, scoring 7 goals, and took part at the 1994 World Cup, where they reached the final.

== Club career ==
Signori was born in Alzano Lombardo, Bergamo. As a youngster he played in the youth system of Inter Milan, but was eventually released after being told by the club that he was too short to succeed as a professional. He went on to make his pro debut for Leffe (1984–86), followed by Piacenza (1986–87 and 1988–89), Trento (1987–88), Foggia (1989–92), Lazio (1992–97), Sampdoria (January–June 1998) and Bologna (1998–2004). He then spent two short periods abroad: first in Greece in 2004 with Iraklis; and then in October 2005 he signed a one-year contract with Hungarian team MFC Sopron to end his professional career.

The pinnacle of Signori's career came at Lazio, where he was the top goalscorer in Serie A three times, in 1993, 1994, and 1996 (the last title shared with Igor Protti). In 1998, he was sold for an undisclosed figure to Sampdoria after being used more sparingly by the Lazio coach Sven-Göran Eriksson. At Bologna, he helped the club to qualify for the 1998–99 UEFA Cup by winning the 1998 UEFA Intertoto Cup that season. Bologna went on to reach the semi-finals of both the UEFA Cup and the Coppa Italia that season. Overall, he scored 188 goals in Italy's top division, the ninth highest in the history of the league, alongside Alessandro Del Piero and Alberto Gilardino.

Between 17 May 1992 and 28 February 1993, Signori scored in a record 10 consecutive away games in Serie A (1 in 1991–92 with Foggia, and 9 in 1992–93 with Lazio). Alongside Cristiano Ronaldo, he holds the records for most consecutive away games with at least one goal in a single season (9), which he set during the 1992–93 season with Lazio.

== International career ==
Signori was not able fully to translate his success to the national level, partly due to differences between him and national coach Arrigo Sacchi, who preferred to play him in the midfield, as a left winger, only using him as a forward on occasion, both as a striker and as a supporting forward. He played for the national side 28 times between 1992 and 1995, scoring seven goals. The only major tournament Signori played in was the 1994 FIFA World Cup, where he appeared six times as Italy finished in second place, but he did not play in the final against Brazil, as Italy were defeated on penalties after a 0–0 draw following extra time. Despite going scoreless during the tournament, he assisted Dino Baggio's match-winning goal against Norway in Italy's second group match, and Roberto Baggio's match-winning goal in the 87th minute of the quarter-final match against Spain.

== Style of play ==
Signori was a fast, hard-working, and diminutive left footed striker, who was a prolific goalscorer, due to his powerful and accurate shot, which drew frequent comparisons with Luigi Riva in the Italian media. A versatile forward, during the early part of his career he was used as a left winger or as a second striker, where his pace, excellent technique, and accurate crossing and passing ability were put to good use; in this position, he was known for his ability to cut in from the left flank and subsequently score by placing the ball at the far post with his left foot. He was also an extremely accurate set piece and penalty-kick taker, and was noted for his tendency to take set pieces and penalties without taking a run-up. When taking penalties, he often observed the keepers' movements, and attempted to send them the wrong first by waiting for them to dive before striking the ball. He scored 44 penalties from 52 attempts, making him one of the most accurate penalty takers in Serie A history, and the fifth most prolific spot kick taker of all time in the Italian league. Alongside Siniša Mihajlović, he is one of two players to have scored a hat-trick from free kicks in Serie A, a feat which he managed with Lazio in a 3–1 home win over Atalanta, on 10 April 1994. In training, in order to refine his accuracy from free kicks, he used to practise by attempting to curl the ball over artificial walls that were up to two metres in height, and that were placed closer to the ball than regulation distance. In addition to his goalscoring and ability as a footballer, he was also known for his leadership and mentality; however, despite his talent, he was also known to be injury prone. Signori was sponsored by Diadora and used to squeeze his feet into boots that were too small for him, claiming that this improved his touch and accuracy on the ball.

== After retirement ==
After working as a Serie A football pundit for RAI Radio1, he served as director of football of Ternana Calcio in 2008 and 2009.

On 1 June 2011, Signori was arrested in connection with a football betting scandal, together with other former players such as Stefano Bettarini and Mauro Bressan. He was initially placed under house arrest, until it was revoked two weeks later. On 9 August 2011, it was announced that he had been banned from any football-related activity for five years. On 23 February 2021, Signori was acquitted due to a "lack of evidence". On 1 June 2021, FIGC's President Gabriele Gravina pardoned Signori to be able to return to football.

== Career statistics ==
=== Club ===
Appearances and goals by club, season and competition
Club	Season	League			Coppa Italia		Europe		Other		Total	
Club	Season	Division	Apps	Goals	Apps	Goals	Apps	Goals	Apps	Goals	Apps	Goals
Leffe Calcio	1984–85	Serie D	8	5	—		—		—		8	5
Leffe Calcio	1985–86	Serie D	30	3	—		—		—		30	3
Leffe Calcio	Total		38	8	0	0	0	0	0	0	38	8
Piacenza	1986–87	Serie C	14	1	3	0	—		—		17	1
Trento	1987–88	Serie C	31	3	—		—		—		31	3
Piacenza	1988–89	Serie B	32	5	5	0	—		—		37	5
Foggia	1989–90	Serie B	34	15	—		—		—		34	15
Foggia	1990–91	Serie B	34	11	3	1	—		—		37	12
Foggia	1991–92	Serie A	32	11	2	0	—		—		34	11
Foggia	Total		100	37	5	1	—		—		105	38
Lazio	1992–93	Serie A	32	26	6	6	—		—		38	32
Lazio	1993–94	Serie A	24	23	1	0	3 (Note: Appearances in UEFA Cup)	0	—		28	23
Lazio	1994–95	Serie A	27	17	5	4	7	0	—		39	21
Lazio	1995–96	Serie A	31	24	4	1	3	1	—		38	26
Lazio	1996–97	Serie A	32	15	4	0	3	0	—		39	15
Lazio	1997–98	Serie A	6	2	4	5	3	2	—		13	9
Lazio	Total		152	107	24	16	19	3	—		195	126
Sampdoria	1997–98	Serie A	17	3	—		—		—		17	3
Bologna	1998–99	Serie A	28	15	5	1	12 (Note: Two appearances and one goal in UEFA Intertoto Cup, ten appearances and five goals in UEFA Cup)	6	2 (Note: Appearances in Serie A UEFA Cup qualification play-offs)	1	47	23
Bologna	1999–2000	Serie A	31	15	1	0	6	4	—		38	19
Bologna	2000–01	Serie A	23	15	2	1	—		—		25	16
Bologna	2001–02	Serie A	14	3	1	0	—		—		15	3
Bologna	2002–03	Serie A	24	12	—		3 (Note: Appearances in UEFA Intertoto Cup)	2	—		27	14
Bologna	2003–04	Serie A	22	6	1	0	—		—		23	6
Bologna	Total		142	66	10	2	21	12	—		175	81
Career total			526	230	47	19	40	15	2	1	615	265

=== International ===
Appearances and goals by national team and year
National team	Year	Apps	Goals
Italy	1992	6	2
Italy	1993	6	2
Italy	1994	13	3
Italy	1995	3	0
Total		28	7

== Honours ==
Leffe

- Campionato Interregionale: 1984–85 (Group B)

Piacenza

- Serie C1: 1986–87

Foggia

- Serie B: 1990–91

Lazio

- Coppa Italia 1997–98

Bologna

- UEFA Intertoto Cup: 1998

Italy

- FIFA World Cup runner-up: 1994

Individual

- Serie A top scorer: 1992–93, 1993–94, 1995–96 (shared with Igor Protti)
- Coppa Italia top scorer: 1992–93, 1997–98
- Guerin d'Oro: 1993
- Premio Nazionale Carriera Esemplare "Gaetano Scirea": 2004
