= 1990–91 Serie B =

Italian football league season

Serie B
- Season: 1990–91
- Champions: Foggia; 1st title
- Promoted: Verona; Cremonese; Ascoli
- Relegated: Salernitana; Reggina; Triestina; Barletta
- Matches: 380
- Goals: 745 (1.96 per match)
- Top goalscorer: Francesco Baiano; Abel Balbo; Walter Casagrande (22 goals each)

Serie B 1990-91 team distribution

The Serie B 1990–91 was the fifty-ninth tournament of this competition played in Italy since its creation.

== Teams ==
Modena, Lucchese, Taranto and Salernitana had been promoted from Serie C, while Udinese, Verona, Cremonese and Ascoli had been relegated from Serie A.

== Final classification ==
Pos	Team	Pld	W	D	L	GF	GA	GD	Pts	Promotion or relegation
1	Foggia (C, P)	38	21	9	8	67	36	+31	51	Promotion to Serie A
2	Verona (P)	38	15	15	8	42	29	+13	45	Promotion to Serie A
3	Cremonese (P)	38	12	19	7	28	21	+7	43	Promotion to Serie A
4	Ascoli (P)	38	13	16	9	48	34	+14	42	Promotion to Serie A
5	Padova	38	13	15	10	41	36	+5	41	
6	Lucchese	38	10	20	8	29	30	−1	40	
7	Reggiana	38	12	15	11	52	45	+7	39	
8	Udinese (Note: 5 points deducted for bribery.)	38	13	17	8	53	43	+10	38	
9	Brescia	38	9	19	10	29	32	−3	37	
10	Ancona	38	11	15	12	38	43	−5	37	
11	Taranto	38	10	17	11	28	33	−5	37	
12	Messina	38	9	19	10	34	45	−11	37	
13	Modena	38	10	16	12	35	35	0	36	
14	Pescara	38	9	18	11	36	32	+4	36	
15	Avellino	38	11	14	13	27	36	−9	36	
16	Cosenza	38	11	14	13	38	50	−12	36	Relegation tie-breaker (Note: Qualified to the relegation tie-breaker for worst head-to-head points against Modena, Pescara and Avellino.)
17	Salernitana (R)	38	7	22	9	29	38	−9	36	Serie C1 after tie-breaker
18	Reggina (R)	38	7	16	15	29	37	−8	30	Relegation to Serie C1
19	Triestina (R)	38	7	16	15	33	43	−10	30	Relegation to Serie C1
20	Barletta (R)	38	8	12	18	29	47	−18	28	Relegation to Serie C1

Source: Head-to-head points used for three or more clubs finishing at the same result.
(C) Champions; (P) Promoted; (R) Relegated

== Results ==
Home \ Away	ANC	ASC	AVE	BRL	BRE	COS	CRE	FOG	LUC	MES	MOD	PAD	PES	REA	REG	SAL	TAR	TRI	UDI	HEL
Ancona		2–0	0–1	1–0	1–1	3–3	0–2	1–0	2–2	1–1	3–1	1–1	3–2	1–1	0–0	3–0	1–0	2–0	0–2	1–1
Ascoli	1–1		2–0	2–0	4–1	2–0	0–0	5–2	2–0	5–1	3–0	1–2	0–0	2–0	0–0	0–0	2–1	1–0	2–1	1–1
Avellino	1–0	1–1		3–1	1–0	0–0	1–0	1–2	1–1	2–0	1–0	2–1	0–0	1–2	1–1	0–0	1–3	0–0	2–0	1–0
Barletta	1–0	0–0	3–0		1–1	0–2	0–1	1–0	2–0	4–0	0–1	1–1	0–0	0–0	2–1	0–0	1–0	1–0	0–1	1–5
Brescia	2–0	2–1	1–0	2–0		1–1	0–0	0–0	2–1	1–0	0–0	0–0	1–1	1–2	0–0	1–2	0–0	1–0	3–0	1–1
Cosenza	2–1	1–1	0–0	1–1	0–0		1–0	1–1	1–0	1–0	2–0	2–0	1–1	2–1	0–0	1–0	2–0	1–2	3–1	0–0
Cremonese	1–0	1–0	0–0	2–2	1–0	2–1		2–0	1–0	0–0	2–0	1–1	1–1	1–1	3–2	2–1	0–0	0–0	0–1	1–1
Foggia	2–0	2–1	5–0	2–0	1–0	5–0	1–0		3–0	2–3	1–0	1–1	3–3	2–1	1–1	4–0	1–0	5–1	2–2	1–0
Lucchese	1–1	0–0	1–2	0–0	0–0	1–0	1–1	2–0		0–0	1–1	2–1	0–0	1–1	2–2	1–0	1–1	2–1	1–0	1–0
Messina	1–1	1–1	1–1	3–0	0–0	2–2	0–0	0–2	0–0		0–0	2–0	1–0	1–0	2–0	1–1	0–0	1–0	2–2	3–1
Modena	0–0	1–2	3–1	1–0	1–1	2–0	0–0	1–3	0–1	1–1		2–0	0–0	0–2	0–0	3–0	2–0	3–0	1–1	2–2
Padova	1–2	1–0	1–0	4–3	0–1	3–0	0–1	0–0	0–0	5–1	1–1		1–0	3–1	3–1	1–1	0–0	1–0	2–1	0–0
Pescara	1–2	0–0	0–0	3–0	2–0	2–0	1–0	2–0	0–0	0–1	0–2	2–2		2–0	1–0	1–1	1–3	2–0	2–2	0–1
Reggiana	1–2	3–3	0–0	2–1	1–1	7–4	0–0	1–2	2–2	4–1	1–0	2–0	1–1		2–0	0–0	1–1	1–0	1–1	4–0
Reggina	1–1	0–0	2–0	2–0	3–0	0–0	1–1	2–4	1–1	1–0	0–1	0–1	2–0	1–0		1–1	0–0	1–2	2–1	0–1
Salernitana	1–0	2–1	1–1	2–2	2–0	2–0	0–0	1–1	0–0	0–0	1–1	0–0	0–3	1–1	2–0		0–0	2–1	1–1	2–2
Taranto	1–1	2–2	1–0	1–1	1–0	2–1	1–0	0–2	0–1	0–0	2–2	0–1	0–0	1–0	1–0	1–1		1–0	1–1	1–0
Triestina	5–0	0–0	2–1	2–0	1–1	2–2	0–0	0–2	0–0	1–1	1–1	2–0	1–1	2–3	0–0	2–1	1–1		1–1	1–1
Udinese	0–0	1–0	0–0	1–0	2–2	4–0	1–1	1–1	2–1	3–3	1–1	2–2	2–1	3–1	2–1	2–0	4–0	1–1		2–0
Hellas Verona	2–0	4–0	1–0	0–0	1–1	1–0	2–0	2–1	0–1	3–0	1–0	0–0	1–0	1–1	1–0	0–0	2–1	1–1	2–0	

Source: Almanacco Illustrato del Calcio - La Storia 1898-2004, Panini Edizioni, Modena, September 2005
Legend: Blue = home team win; Yellow = draw; Red = away team win.

== Relegation tie-breaker ==
26 June 1991

Cosenza	1–0 (a.e.t.)	Salernitana
Marulla 98'

Stadio Adriatico, Pescara
Attendance: 15,000
Referee: Tullio Lanese

Salernitana relegated to Serie C1.

== Season tickets ==
The season ticket sales as they were before the beginning of the season:

Rank	Club	Tickets
1	Salernitana	13.143
2	Foggia	7.442
3	Udinese	6.758
4	Avellino	6.001
5	Hellas Verona	5.284
6	Pescara	4.152
7	Lucchese	3.031
8	Triestina	2.782
9	Taranto	2.780
10	Reggiana	2.310
11	Ascoli	2.118
12	Cremonese	1.776
13	Reggina	1.586
14	Cosenza	1.614
15	Padova	1.609
16	Messina	1.499
17	Modena	1.265
18	Barletta	1.101
19	Ancona	1.020
20	Brescia	896

== Attendances ==
#	Club	Average
1	Salernitana	18,413
2	Hellas	15,242
3	Foggia	15,195
4	Udinese	12,216
5	Pescara	10,847
6	Avellino	9,559
7	Padova	9,316
8	Cosenza	7,663
9	Reggiana	7,610
10	Taranto	7,538
11	Messina	7,524
12	Reggina	7,470
13	Ascoli	7,354
14	Lucchese	7,321
15	Cremonese	7,164
16	Ancona	5,923
17	Brescia	5,723
18	Triestina	5,721
19	Modena	5,665
20	Barletta	4,630

== References and sources ==
- Almanacco Illustrato del Calcio - La Storia 1898-2004, Panini Edizioni, Modena, September 2005
