= Zdeněk Zeman =

Czech-Italian football coach (born 1947)

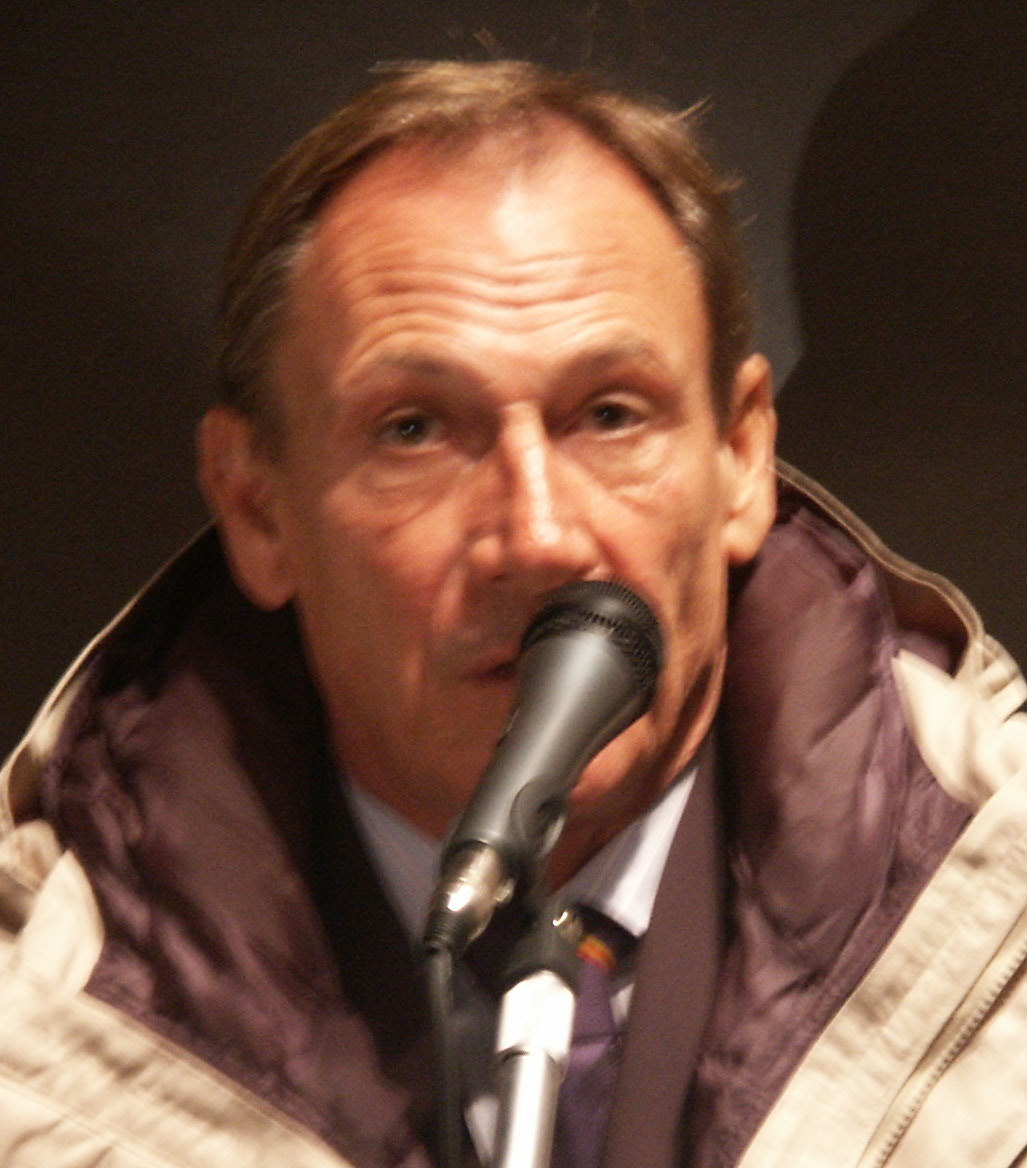
- Zeman in 2006

Personal information
- Date of birth: 12 May 1947 (age 79)
- Place of birth: Prague, Czechoslovakia (now Czech Republic)

Managerial career
- Years: Team
- 1983–1986: Licata
- 1986–1987: Foggia
- 1987: Parma
- 1988–1989: Messina
- 1989–1994: Foggia
- 1994–1997: Lazio
- 1997–1999: Roma
- 1999–2000: Fenerbahçe
- 2000: Napoli
- 2001–2002: Salernitana
- 2003–2004: Avellino
- 2004–2005: Lecce
- 2006: Brescia
- 2006: Lecce
- 2008: Red Star Belgrade
- 2010–2011: Foggia
- 2011–2012: Pescara
- 2012–2013: Roma
- 2014: Cagliari
- 2015: Cagliari
- 2015–2016: Lugano
- 2017–2018: Pescara
- 2021–2022: Foggia
- 2023–2024: Pescara

Zdeněk Zeman (Czech pronunciation: [ˈzdɛɲɛk ˈzɛman]; born 12 May 1947) is a Czech-Italian former professional football manager who is known for his exciting, offensive footballing tactics and use of the 4–3–3 formation.

Zeman has managed numerous teams over the years, mostly in Italian football. He has won the Serie B title twice, with Foggia and with Pescara.

== Career ==
=== Early years ===
Zeman's football coaching career started in Sicily, where he resided since the late 1960s. His first coaching experiences were for amateur football teams from the outskirts of Palermo (Cinisi, Bacigalupo, Carini, Esacalza, Misilmeri). In 1974, thanks to his uncle Čestmír Vycpálek's aid, he had his first notable experience as part of the Palermo youth coaching staff, which ended in 1983.

In 1975, he graduated with honours at the ISEF of Palermo (a sports school) with a dissertation in sports medicine. In 1979, he finally obtained the patentino (a license for coaching football at the professional level) at Coverciano's school for football coaches.

His first opportunity as a professional head coach came from Licata, a small-medium city in the province of Agrigento, where he won Serie C2 with a team mainly composed of youngsters. In 1986, he then left Licata to join Foggia of Serie C1, but he was sacked before the end of the championship. In 1987, he became coach for Parma of Serie B but was fired after seven matches. In 1988, he returned to Sicily as coach of Messina, finishing in eighth place at the end of the season, thanks to the goals of Salvatore Schillaci.

=== Zemanlandia: from third division to Serie A with Foggia ===
In 1989, the Foggia chairman Pasquale Casillo, having repented of firing him a few years before, re-appointed Zeman once again. It was to be the beginning of the miracle Foggia, also known as Zemanlandia (after Zeman himself), a team of, in those days, unknown players; amongst them, Giuseppe Signori and Francesco Baiano, who regularly punched above their weight in the league. In two years, the team got promoted to Serie A.

The first appearances of Foggia in Serie A are still quite unimaginable, with a team considered extremely weak verging on UEFA Cup qualification for three consecutive years. This was achieved by playing an impressive, attacking style of play, with the 4–3–3 module a clear trademark of Zdeněk Zeman's footballing views. During those years at Foggia, players like Roberto Rambaudi, Luigi Di Biagio, Igor Shalimov, José Antonio Chamot, Dan Petrescu and Igor Kolyvanov came through. It is said that Zeman's tactics were inspired by his time playing, not football, but handball as a student.

=== Lazio and Roma ===
In 1994, Zeman left Foggia for the greater challenge of Lazio, leading the Biancocelesti to second and third-place finishes, before being fired in January 1997. He is credited with launching the career of Alessandro Nesta whilst managing Lazio, giving the young defender many first-team opportunities. In the next season, Zeman decided to stay in Rome, becoming the head coach of Roma and the burgeoning talent of Francesco Totti.

After a good fourth place with some sparkling play, Zeman launched allegations about the abuse of pharmaceutical products in Italian football, citing former Juventus players Gianluca Vialli (at the time at Chelsea) and Alessandro Del Piero of unnatural muscle growth in July 1998. As a consequence, courts began a round of trials over Juventus executive Antonio Giraudo and sports doctor Riccardo Agricola, the latter were found guilty of administering drugs to players (including the use of EPO) between 1994 and 1998, and condemned to a one-year and ten months jail term in 2004, even though he was absolved the next year by a Court of Appeal. The following appeal presented by the Public Prosecutor to the Italian Supreme Court against the second degree sentence, despite the fact that the illegitimate administration of drugs to footballers aimed at altering sports results was proven, the statute of limitations for the crime then came in 2006 due to exceeding the terms. In the following 1998–99 season Zeman reached a fifth-place finish with AS Roma but was replaced by Fabio Capello during the summer of 1999.

=== 2000s ===
His next coaching adventures, for Fenerbahçe and Napoli, were not lucky; Zeman's coaching reputation quickly lost stock, leaving him unable to find a team willing to hire him. After three Serie B years at Salernitana (two years, a sixth-place finish, and a dismissal), and Avellino (second-last placed, with a young Vitali Kutuzov on team), in 2004 Serie A team Lecce gambled on him. Zeman, who had one of the youngest Serie A rosters at his disposal, answered with a good season, leading the team to a mid-table position and giving talented youngsters like Valeri Bojinov and Mirko Vučinić an opportunity. At the end of the season, Zeman resigned. After nine months without a team, Zeman was appointed on 5 March 2006 as the new head coach of Brescia, taking in his first time a team in the half-season. However, Brescia, who were in third place in Serie B when Zeman was hired, suffered a heavy fall in terms of results, and the team could not maintain a place in the promotion playoffs, with eight points in eleven matches. After the end of the season, Zeman resigned from Brescia, criticizing his players for not having accepted his tactics.

On 21 June 2006, Zeman returned to Lecce, signing a one-year contract with the giallorossi, who were relegated to Serie B in 2005–2006. Because of poor results, he was fired on 24 December and replaced by Giuseppe Papadopulo.

On 17 June 2008, Red Star Belgrade unveiled Zeman as their new head coach. However, after only five competitive games as Red Star's head coach, on 6 September 2008 Zeman was sacked because of catastrophic results in Serbian League and UEFA Cup. During Zeman's management, Red Star hadn't managed to score in three domestic league matches, and the club found themselves at the bottom of the table for the first time in 24 years. Red Star were also eliminated in the qualifying round of the UEFA Cup by APOEL from Cyprus.

=== 2010s: back to Foggia, and Pescara ===
On 20 July 2010, it was confirmed that Zeman would take over as the new head coach of his former club Foggia, rejoining chairman Pasquale Casillo and director of football Giuseppe Pavone as part of the trio who led the Satanelli into Serie A back in the 1990s. He left the club at the end of May, after ending the regular season in sixth place, and failing to qualify for the promotion playoffs despite his Foggia team being the team with the highest goalscoring ratio among all Italian professional leagues.

On 21 June 2011, Zeman was announced as new head coach/technical director of Serie B club Pescara, signing a one-year contract with the Adriatici. At Pescara, Zeman coached a team composed of promising youngsters, many of them re-joining him from his previous season at the helm of Foggia (among them, Simone Romagnoli, Ciro Immobile and Lorenzo Insigne, and also Marco Verratti); under his tenure, the Biancoazzurri from Abruzzo entered straight into the race for automatic promotion and provided a record goalscoring ratio for Italian standard (90 goals in 42 games, Serie B record). On 21 May 2012, Pescara won automatic promotion to Serie A following a 3–1 away win at Sampdoria, thus ensuring Zeman a top-flight return at his first season as head coach. He went on to win the Serie B title in the season's final game.

On 17 February 2013, Zeman was awarded the Panchina d'Argento to recognize his past season's successes as head coach of Pescara.

=== 2012–13: Return to Roma ===
On 4 June 2012, it was confirmed that Zeman would be the new head coach of his former club Roma, signing a two-year contract, effective from 1 July 2012 to 30 June 2014; his staff will be composed by assistant manager Vincenzo Cangelosi, technical collaborator Giacomo Modica and fitness coach Roberto Ferola. The agreement marked Zeman's return at the Giallorossi after thirteen years. His appointment also led The Wall Street Journal to unusually dedicate him an article, labelling him "Soccer's Jedi."

His second stint as Roma head coach became controversial after he decided to sideline several key players, such as Maarten Stekelenburg, Pablo Osvaldo and, most significantly, vice-captain and one-club player Daniele De Rossi. A successive decline in results then led to rumours involving the future of Zeman, with director of football Walter Sabatini explicitly confirming about a potential dismissal at the end of January.

On 2 February 2013, Zeman was relieved from his coaching post after a 2–4 home loss to Cagliari that left Roma in eighth position after 23 matches, and was replaced by the club's technique coach Aurelio Andreazzoli. After being sacked, player Miralem Pjanić commented that hiring Zeman had been a good decision, believing that the club's athletic all-attacking style of play the team's main strength, albeit also being one of its most significant weaknesses. Zeman initially stated that he was not bitter about being sacked by Roma and played down the rumours of his retirement, although he later said in an interview with Italian sports newspaper La Gazzetta dello Sport that he was still critical towards the team over his sacking.

=== 2014–15: Two spells with Cagliari ===
In June 2014, Zeman returned to football management, being appointed the new head coach of Serie A club Cagliari after a successful takeover led by entrepreneur Tommaso Giulini. In the fifth game of the season, Zeman got a surprising but deserved victory of 1–4 playing away against Internazionale, briefly staving off rumours of dismissal after a mediocre start of the season. However, he was sacked on 23 December 2014, following a poor run. Cagliari achieved only two wins in their sixteen league fixtures, leaving them eighteenth in the relegation zone.

On 9 March 2015, just a few months after initially being sacked, Cagliari reappointed Zeman as head coach, the club having sacked Gianfranco Zola. Zeman resigned from the post after just five games, in which Cagliari picked up just one point from the available 15.

=== 2015–16: Lugano ===
In June 2015, Zeman signed a contract with newly promoted Swiss Super League club Lugano. On 26 May 2016, Zeman helped the club avoid relegation with a 3–0 win over St. Gallen. On 29 May, however, Lugano were defeated 1–0 by last placed Zürich in the 2016 Swiss Cup Final. He left the club at the end of the season.

=== 2017: Return to Pescara ===
On 17 February 2017, Zeman was confirmed as the new head coach of last-placed Serie A team Pescara in place of Massimo Oddo, thus returning to coach the club he guided to the top flight back in 2012. On 19 February, his debut return on the Pescara bench, Pescara won a 5–0 against Genoa, their first home victory since June 2016. Zeman was fired from Pescara on 4 March 2018 after a 2–0 loss to Serie B side Cittadella and were left in 13th place in the table.

=== 2021–2022: Foggia ===
On 27 June 2021, after days of speculation, Foggia announced to have re-hired 74-year old Zeman, after three years of inactivity, on a one-year deal for the 2021–22 Serie C campaign. He teamed up again with Giuseppe Pavone in his new stint with the Satanelli.

On 25 January 2022, Zeman and Pavone extended their contracts for one more year. He eventually guided Foggia to a spot in the promotion playoffs, in which they eliminated Turris and Avellino before being eliminated by Virtus Entella in the third round. On 26 May 2022, Foggia announced that they had parted ways with Zeman after only one season.

=== 2023–2024: third spell at Pescara and health issues ===
On 27 February 2023, the 75-year-old Zeman agreed to return to Pescara for a third time, taking charge of the Serie C club until the end of the season. After guiding Pescara to the promotion playoffs, where they were eliminated by Foggia on penalties in the semi-finals, he was confirmed in charge of the Delfino for the 2023–24 campaign as well.

On 12 December 2023, Zeman was admitted to a private clinic in Pescara after having suffered a transient ischemic attack before a scheduled training session. He was released from the clinic three days later, being however forced to temporarily hand over coaching duties to his assistant Giovanni Bucaro. On 19 December, Zeman regularly returned to his coaching duties. On 17 February 2024, Zeman was again forced to hand over coaching duties to his assistant after being admitted to a hospital to undergo a surgery. On 19 February 2024, it was confirmed Zeman had successfully undergone heart surgery. Three days later, Zeman tended his resignations to the Pescara board, with his assistant Bucaro being appointed as the new permanent head coach until the end of the season.

== Personal life ==
Son of a physician and a housewife, Zeman is also related to Čestmír Vycpálek, former Juventus player and coach, who was his uncle from his mother's side. In 1968, Zeman went to Palermo to visit him; however, at that same time, his country was invaded by Warsaw Pact troops, so he decided to stay indefinitely in Italy.

He successively obtained Italian citizenship in 1975 and later married a woman from Palermo, Chiara Perricone, with whom he had two children named Karel and Andrea; Karel successively went on into following his father's footsteps by becoming a football manager, starting at amateur level with teams such as Bojano and Manfredonia before taking over his first professional role at Lega Pro Seconda Divisione outfit Fano in March 2012. He then served as head coach of Qormi in Malta before becoming boss of Sardinian Serie D amateurs Selargius in the summer of 2014, contemporaneously with his father's appointment at Cagliari.

His appeal has stretched outside the football world, with singer/songwriter (and well-known AS Roma fan) Antonello Venditti, dedicating a song called La coscienza di Zeman (Zeman's conscience, a play-on-words on the famous Italian novel La coscienza di Zeno) to him. Zeman was also the "guru" who inspired the character Frengo by Italian comedian Antonio Albanese. He was also the subject of several biopics, mostly covering his early Foggia years, such as Zemanlandia. Zeman is also known for being a heavy smoker and an iconic man of very few words with a cult following throughout Italy that goes across all football rivalries.

In 2022, Zeman published his autobiography, titled La bellezza non ha prezzo (English: Beauty has no price), written together with La Gazzetta dello Sport journalist Andrea Di Caro.

On 18 October 2024, it was reported Zeman was admitted to a private health clinic in Pescara after having suffered a brain ischemia in his residency in Rome, just a few months after having suffered a transient ischemic attack that had forced him to quit his football activities.

== Tactics and style of management ==
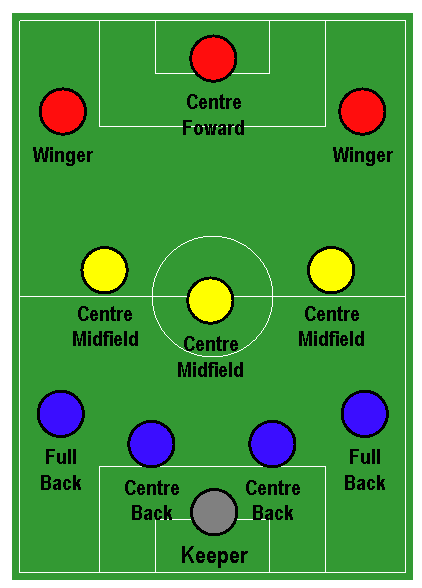
The 4–3–3 football scheme

Based on Dutch Totaal Voetbal, Zdeněk Zeman has described the concept of his 4–3–3 system as "geometry", and his teams also known for approaching a football philosophy clearly based on lively, quick, attacking play, the offside trap, and zonal marking. His teams are well known for their fast, spectacular, aggressive, and offensive style of play, as well as their ability to score many goals, but also for the corresponding tendency to concede them. His tactics were also influenced by his time playing handball in his youth.

Zeman has been praised for his coaching techniques, especially in athletic preparation, fitness, and training. His tactical systems rely on a high pressing and defensive line, with a deep-lying playmaker providing long passes and switching the play. Wingers move inside the channels as a creative roles. However, his outspokenness and lack of major trophies have been criticized by some within the sport.

Having the right players for his tactical system is essential; usually the characteristics needed by his players are:

- Sweeper Keeper: In addition to being a good shot-stopper, the goalkeeper must be capable of reading the game and quick to come off his goal-line to anticipate opponents outside the area who have beaten the offside trap; he must also have good ball control, dribbling ability and distribution with his hands and feet.
- Wing Backs: They must be offensive wingbacks, not merely defensive-minded fullbacks. The use of quick, hard-working attacking wing backs is one of the most critical aspects of Zeman's tactics and formation, as they often overlap with the wingers to provide crosses into the box, while also returning to defend.
- Centre Backs: Complete and strong, with good heading ability, marking, tackling, jumping, pace, positioning and acceleration, as well as good technique and ball playing ability. One of the two central defenders must also be able to drop further back from the defensive line whenever the offside trap is not possible, in the similar manner of a libero or sweeper.
- Central Midfielders: The central midfield pivot in Zeman's three-man midfield system is a complete and versatile player who is a hybrid of a defensive midfielder, a box-to-box midfielder, and a deep-lying playmaker. The centre-midfielder, therefore, must be effective defensively. Still, he must be equally capable of creating attacking plays after winning back possession and making offensive runs into the area off the ball. He must be a quick, hard-working, physically fit, strong player, creative on the ball, and an excellent long passer and tackler. This role has also been likened to that of a metodista ("centre-half," in Italian football jargon) due to the necessity for the player to dictate play in midfield, launch quick attacks, or assist their team defensively, as well as to maintain their position and thus allowing Zeman's teams to maintain a high defensive line with little space between the attack and the defence. The left and right centre midfielders must also be hard-working and well-rounded box-to-box players with good technique, offensive capabilities, and passing ability.
- Outside Forwards/Wingers: Zeman's formation makes fundamental use of hard-working wingers with pace, stamina, creative abilities, and good technique and dribbling skills. Instead of hugging the touchline like traditional wingers, in his system, they are set to move into channels often functioning as inverted wingers or outside forwards. Although they are given more tactical freedom than most players in his formation, they must also be capable of scoring and making the right attacking movements. Off the ball, the wingers are tasked with defensive duties such as pressing opposing defenders and committing tactical fouls to anticipate and take time away from them on the ball; offensively, they are also required to switch positions with their runs off the ball to create gaps for teammates to exploit in the opposing defence.
- Central Forward: The leading striker must be a complete, hard-working, mobile, and intelligent team player, who is quick, strong, and an accurate finisher with both feet and head. The centre-forward must also have solid technique and an excellent positional sense, as well as good movement and the ability to hold up the ball for teammates when playing with his back to goal to lay off the ball to other players making attacking runs.

== Managerial statistics ==
As of 22 February 2024

Managerial record by team and tenure
Team	From	To	Record				
Team	From	To	G	W	D	L	Win %
Licata	7 June 1983	2 June 1986	128	51	41	36	39.84
Foggia	3 June 1986	6 April 1987	33	12	11	10	36.36
Parma	23 June 1987	26 October 1987	12	4	4	4	33.33
Messina	22 June 1988	19 June 1989	43	14	13	16	32.56
Foggia	19 June 1989	3 May 1994	196	72	59	65	36.73
Lazio	4 May 1994	27 January 1997	118	60	25	33	50.85
Roma	18 June 1997	6 June 1999	86	39	26	21	45.35
Fenerbahçe	12 October 1999	12 January 2000	11	3	5	3	27.27
Napoli	13 June 2000	15 November 2000	8	0	3	5	0.00
Salernitana	20 June 2001	29 December 2002	60	18	16	26	30.00
Avellino	30 June 2003	15 June 2004	49	8	13	28	16.33
Lecce	15 June 2004	3 June 2005	42	12	14	16	28.57
Brescia	5 March 2006	22 June 2006	11	2	2	7	18.18
Lecce	22 June 2006	4 January 2007	19	6	2	11	31.58
Red Star Belgrade	17 June 2008	7 September 2008	5	0	3	2	0.00
Foggia	21 July 2010	10 June 2011	42	20	6	16	47.62
Pescara	22 June 2011	4 June 2012	43	26	6	11	60.47
Roma	4 June 2012	2 February 2013	26	13	4	9	50.00
Cagliari	2 July 2014	23 December 2014	18	3	7	8	16.67
Cagliari	9 March 2015	21 April 2015	5	0	1	4	0.00
Lugano	1 July 2015	4 June 2016	42	14	8	20	33.33
Pescara	17 February 2017	4 March 2018	45	13	12	20	28.89
Foggia	1 July 2021	26 May 2022	43	18	15	10	41.86
Pescara	27 February 2023	22 February 2024	47	23	10	14	48.94
Total			1,132	431	306	395	38.07

== Honours ==
=== Manager ===
Licata

- Serie C2 (1): 1984–85

Foggia

- Serie B (1): 1990–91

Pescara

- Serie B (1): 2011–12

=== Individual ===
Manager

- Silver Bench (1): 2011–12

== See also ==
List of football managers with the most matches
