= Maestrelli =

Maestrelli is an Italian surname. Notable people with the surname include:

- Alessio Maestrelli (born 2003), Italian footballer
- Andrea Maestrelli (born 1998), Italian football player
- Emma Maestrelli (born 2000), known professionally as Emma Nolde, Italian singer-songwriter and multi-instrumentalist
- Francesco Maestrelli (born 2002), Italian tennis player
- Tommaso Maestrelli (1922–1976), Italian footballer and manager
