= Marco Materazzi =

Italian footballer (born 1973)

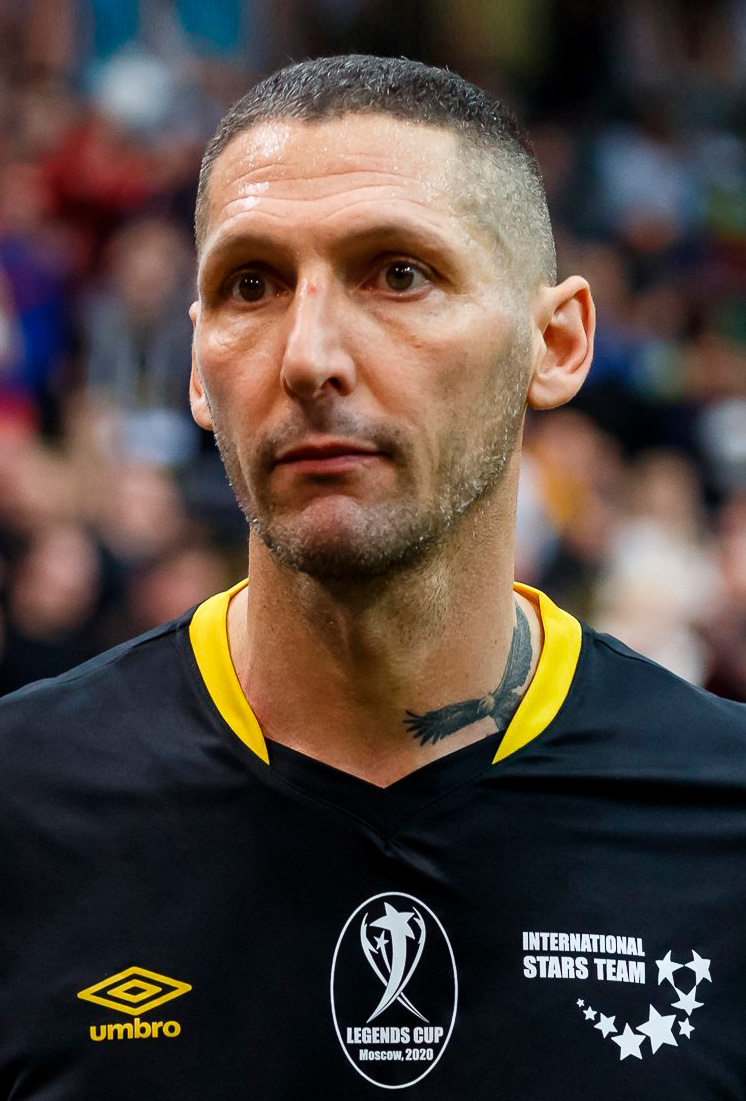
- Materazzi before a Legends Cup match in 2020

Personal information
- Full name: Marco Materazzi
- Date of birth: 19 August 1973 (age 53)
- Place of birth: Lecce, Italy
- Height: 1.93 m (6 ft 4 in)
- Position: Centre back

Youth career
- 1988–1990: Lazio

Senior career*
Years	Team	Apps	(Gls)
1990–1991	Messina	1	(0)
1991–1993	Tor di Quinto	12	(0)
1993–1994	Marsala	25	(4)
1994–1995	Trapani	13	(2)
1995–1998	Perugia	47	(7)
1996–1997	→ Carpi (loan)	18	(7)
1998–1999	Everton	25	(1)
1999–2001	Perugia	51	(15)
2001–2011	Inter Milan	184	(18)
2014–2015	Chennaiyin	7	(0)
Total		383	(55)

International career
2001–2008	Italy	41	(2)

Managerial career
- 2014–2016: Chennaiyin (player-manager)
Medal record
Men's football
Representing Italy
FIFA World Cup
Winner	2006 Germany
- * Club domestic league appearances and goals

Marco Materazzi Ufficiale OMRI (Italian pronunciation: [ˈmarko mateˈrattsi]; born 19 August 1973) is an Italian former professional football player and manager. A controversial and provocative figure in football, he was known for his very physical and aggressive style of defending, which saw him collect numerous cards throughout his career.

Early in his career, Materazzi played with various Italian teams in Serie D, Serie C, and Serie B, and with Everton in the Premier League. He spent two periods with Perugia and signed for Inter Milan in 2001 for €10 million. At club level, he won a number of major honors with Inter, including five Serie A league titles in a row from 2006 to 2010, one UEFA Champions League, one FIFA Club World Cup, four Coppa Italia titles, and the Supercoppa Italiana four times. Having played around 270 games for Inter, he announced his retirement from playing shortly after leaving the club in 2011. Materazzi came out of retirement in 2014 when he was appointed player-manager of Chennaiyin in the Indian Super League.

Materazzi earned 41 caps for Italy from his debut in 2001 until 2008, playing in two FIFA World Cups and two UEFA European Championships. He was one of the key players in the 2006 FIFA World Cup Final against France; he gave away an early penalty that led to France's first goal, scored Italy's equalising goal twelve minutes later and, in extra time, received a headbutt from Zinedine Zidane who was punished with a red card. Italy then went on to win the World Cup in a penalty shoot-out, during which Materazzi scored again.

== Club career ==
=== Early career ===
Materazzi began his footballing career with the Lazio and then the Messina Peloro youth teams from 1990 to 1991. He spent his early career in the lower divisions of Italian football, with amateur side Tor di Quinto, Serie C2 team Marsala, and Serie C1 Trapani, where he narrowly missed a historic promotion to Serie B after losing a promotion playoff to Gualdo. Serie B squad Perugia signed Materazzi for the first time in 1995, but he spent a part of the 1996–97 season in Serie C with Carpi.

He then spent the 1998–99 season with Everton, where he was sent off three times in just 27 games, and scored twice, against Middlesbrough in the league and Huddersfield Town in the League Cup.

He then returned to Perugia in 1999 and scored 12 goals, including seven from penalties in the 2000–01 season, breaking Daniel Passarella's Serie A record of most goals by a defender in one season.

=== Inter Milan ===
==== 2001–2004: Debut and controversies ====
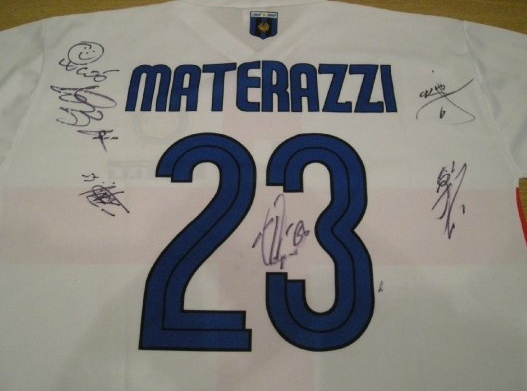
Materazzi's number 23 shirt

Materazzi was signed by Inter Milan in July 2001 for €10 million. He took squad number 23 and made his competitive debut for the club on 26 August in the opening championship match against Perugia. Materazzi's first goal for Inter came only in his second appearance, netting inside 10 minutes in a 2–2 draw at Parma. He also played eight times in the season's UEFA Cup, with his competition debut coming on 20 September in the 3–0 win versus Romania's Brașov.

Materazzi played 23 matches in league, including the final decisive match versus Lazio which lost Inter the championship title; he was a protagonist in a controversial episode following the final whistle, as he was involved in a heated discussion with the opposition players which turned into a physical confrontation. He was caught by the cameras shouting at Lazio captain Alessandro Nesta, saying: "I won you the title", in reference to Perugia's win over Juventus in 2000 which lead Lazio to the title.

In the following season, Materazzi made 33 appearances across all competitions, including 13 in UEFA Champions League, where he played his first match on 14 August 2002 in a goalless draw against Sporting CP.

Materazzi's 2003–04 season was blighted by injuries, including one he suffered on 25 November during the 5–1 home loss to Arsenal in UEFA Champions League group stage which kept him out of action for two months. He was at the center of a controversy again at the beginning of 2004 for aggression towards Siena player Bruno Cirillo. This happened on 1 February in a match which was won 4–0 by Inter. Materazzi (who did not play in the match) confronted Cirillo in the dressing rooms and begun spewing insults towards him. He also punched him in the face, fracturing his lip. After the incident, the sports judge Maurizio Laudi suspended Materazzi until 29 March, meaning that he missed eight club matches and one international match. In addition to his domestic suspension, Materazzi was also suspended by UEFA for two UEFA Cup games. Inter was also fined with €5,000. Materazzi later apologized for the incident, saying that he "behaved badly" and "reacted in a bad way", also adding that he would not appeal the suspension.

==== 2004–2008: Domestic success under Mancini ====
In July 2004, at the start of 2004–05 season, the Inter bench was entrusted to manager Roberto Mancini, with whom – in the first season – Materazzi lost his place in the starting lineup. In the next season he played more, and was the only Italian to score a goal for the club that season. On 5 March 2006, Materazzi scored an 89th-minute header at Roma to rescue his side a point and to break the hosts' record of 11 consecutive victories. He finished the 2005–06 season by totaling 39 appearances across all competitions.

Materazzi signed a new contract in August 2006 which kept him at San Siro until June 2010. At the end of the year he was a nominee for UEFA Team of the Year along with teammate Fabio Grosso. The 2006–07 season saw him scoring 10 goals, thus being the top scoring defender of Serie A. He notably scored in the 4–3 win in Derby della Madonnina against Milan, an overhead kick versus Messina and a brace away to Siena on 23 April which won the club's 15th league title with five games remaining. For his performances, Materazzi was voted the Serie A Defender of the Year.

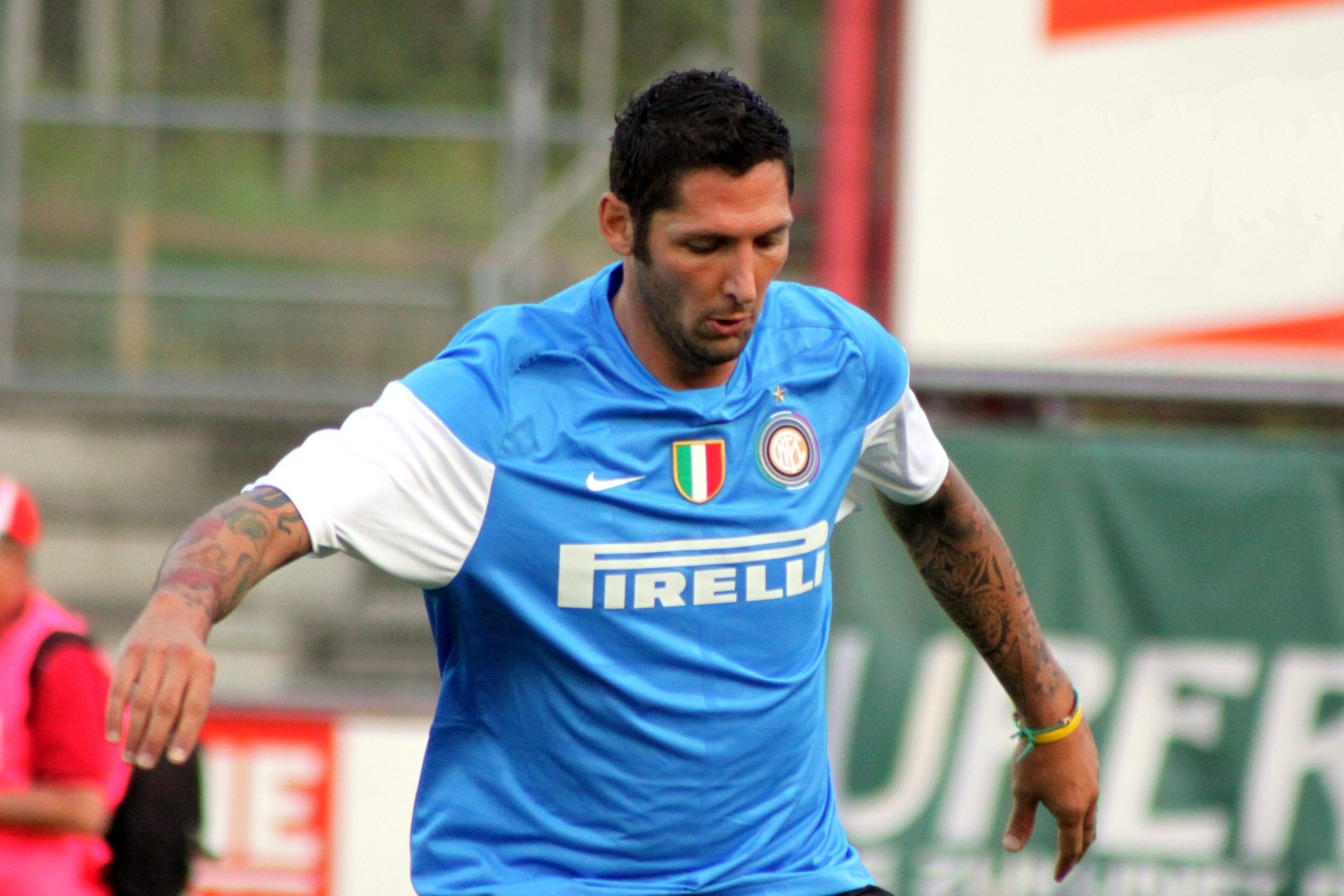
Materazzi during a training session

Materazzi missed the first part of 2007–08 season due to an injury suffered whilst on international duty which forced him to be sidelined until November 2007. Later, in February of the following year, Materazzi gave a poor display in the first leg of 2007–08 UEFA Champions League first knockout round against Liverpool, receiving a red card in the 30th minute, as Inter lost 2–0 at Anfield. His performance was criticised by his teammates after the end of the match. Later on throughout the season, during a 2–2 draw against Siena, Materazzi argued with striker Julio Ricardo Cruz on whom to take a penalty kick. Eventually, it was Materazzi who took it but his attempt was easily saved by Alex Manninger. It was his first miss since 2001. The draw spoiled Inter's chances of winning the title with one game to spare. After the match, the choice to take the penalty was criticized by manager Roberto Mancini while Materazzi himself apologized, stating that it should have been Cruz the one to take it. Inter eventually won the championship for the third consecutive time after defeating Parma 2–0 in the last matchday with Materazzi playing full-90 minutes. He concluded the season with 23 Serie A appearances, 4 Coppa Italia appearances, 1 Supercoppa Italiana appearance and 3 UEFA Champions League appearances for a total of 33 appearances.

==== 2008–2011: Final years and more glory ====
The summer of 2008 saw the arrival of Portuguese manager José Mourinho, who did not see Materazzi as the first choice in defence, relegating him to the bench. Apart from that, his season was also marred by injuries, which reduced his league tally to only 8 appearances. He scored his first UEFA Champions League goal on 4 November in a 3–3 draw at Anorthosis in the Group B matchday 4. Materazzi won his fourth championship on 17 May 2009 following Inter's 3–0 defeat of Siena. Despite playing rarely, he was still praised by president Massimo Moratti, who said that Materazzi "always played well whenever he was called upon last season", while manager Mourinho stated that he wanted to have Materazzi in his team.

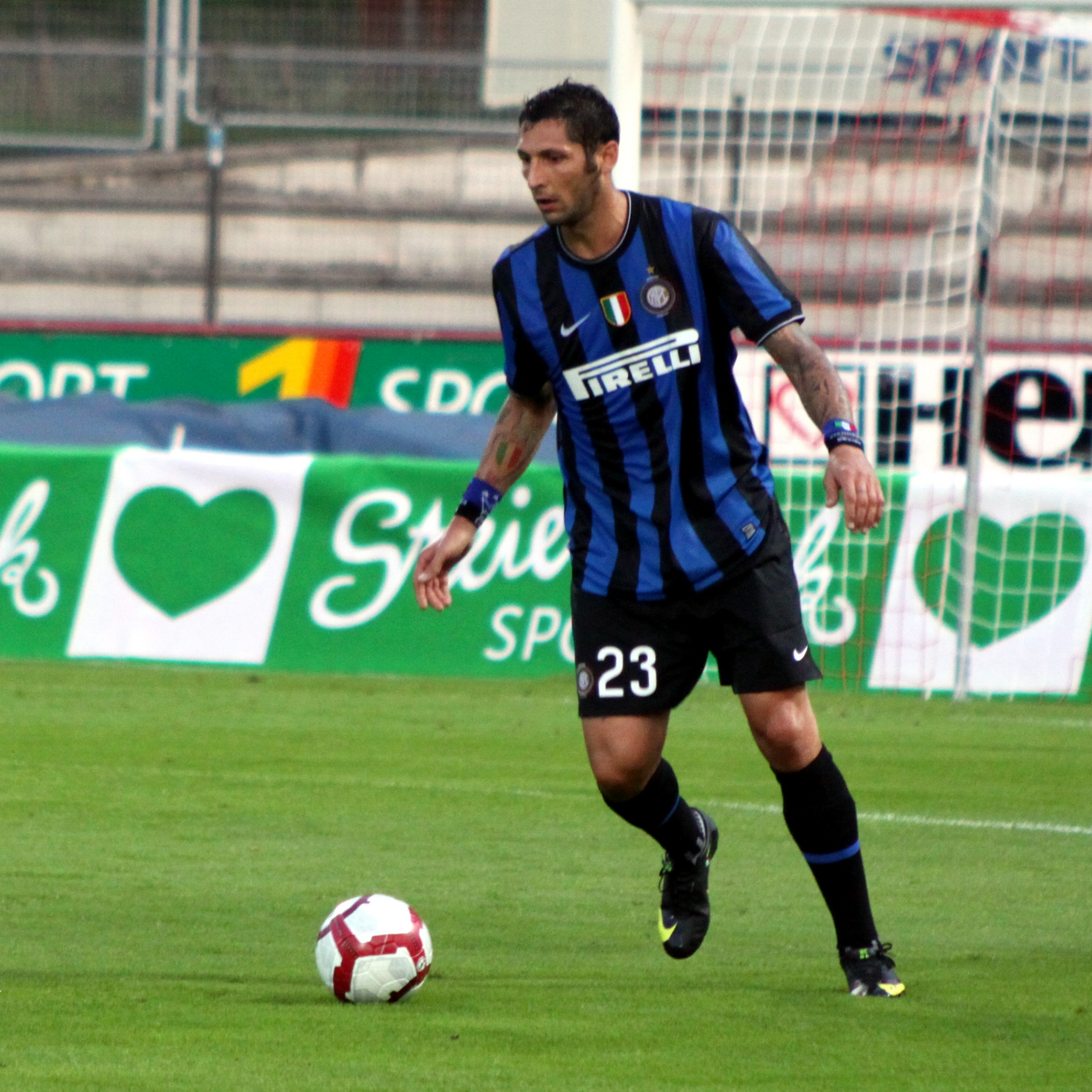
Materazzi in action for Inter

In June 2009, Materazzi was handed a new deal by Inter until June 2012. He was used sparingly during the 2009–10 season, making 20 appearances in all competitions. In January 2010, he underwent arthroscopic surgery to repair damage to the medial meniscus in his right knee which kept him sidelined for one month. Materazzi was an injury-time substitute for Inter in the 2010 UEFA Champions League Final against Bayern Munich, replacing Diego Milito who scored both of their goals in the 2–0 victory in Madrid. In addition to that, Inter also clinched the Scudetto, for the fifth season in a row, and Coppa Italia, to complete the Treble.

He began the 2010–11 season by coming on in the last minutes of a 3–1 home win over Roma in the Supercoppa Italiana match. Materazzi's first league match of the season came later in November where he started in the derby against Milan due to the absence of Walter Samuel; he conceded a penalty in 4th minute for fouling Zlatan Ibrahimović and was later sent to hospital after a receiving a kung-fu kick in the stomach by the Swede. Inter lost the match 1–0. Following the end of the match, manager Rafael Benítez calmed the situation by stating that Materazzi's injury "doesn't seem serious". He returned in action two weeks later by playing full-90 minutes in a 5–2 home win over Parma. In December, Materazzi was included in Inter's squad for 2010 FIFA Club World Cup, remaining on the bench as Inter won their 5th title of the year.

Materazzi left the club in July 2011 after not being offered a new contract, having played around 270 games for the club and winning 15 trophies, and shortly after, announced his retirement from the sport. He was later appointed in the role of ambassador to Inter. Later, Materazzi accused manager Leonardo of "stabbing him in the back" and being the reason for his departure from Inter, and also threw accusations to president Massimo Moratti of not having defended him against Leonardo.

=== Chennaiyin ===
On 22 September 2014, Materazzi was signed as the player-manager of Chennaiyin in the inaugural season of the Indian Super League. Materazzi signed a two-season contract with Chennaiyin for $1 million (USD) every season. Materazzi did not choose himself to play in their opening match, a 2–1 victory at FC Goa on 15 October courtesy of a free kick from marquee player and former Brazil international Elano. Six days later in his first home game, Chennaiyin defeated the Kerala Blasters 2–1, but four days after that he lost for the first time, 1–4 to the Delhi Dynamos. In the club's fourth match of the season, he selected himself to play for the first time, starting in a 5–1 win over Mumbai City. On 28 November, he brought his former international defensive partner Alessandro Nesta out of retirement to play for Chennaiyin until the end of the season. Chennaiyin finished the 14-game regular season in first place in the league, with Materazzi having made 6 appearances. In the end-of-season play-offs, the team were eliminated in extra time in the semi-finals by the Kerala Blasters.

At the end of the 2015 season, in which Materazzi led Chennaiyin to the Indian Super League championship, his contract ended. After the conclusion of the 2016 season, it was announced that Materazzi would not return to the club for 2017.

== International career ==
=== Debut and 2002 World Cup ===
On 25 April 2001, Materazzi made his debut for the Italy national team in a 1–0 friendly match victory against South Africa. He made two appearances in the qualifying campaign against Georgia and Hungary. In the final tournament of the 2002 FIFA World Cup, Materazzi was used as a reserve player to back up Alessandro Nesta and Fabio Cannavaro. He made only one appearance by coming on as a substitute for Nesta in the 2–1 loss to Croatia in the group stage. In the 90th minute, Materazzi played a floating ball over the top from just over halfway to Filippo Inzaghi but there was no touch on the ball, leading it to rolling all the way in the back of the net, but the goal was disallowed after referee Graham Poll claimed that Inzaghi had grabbed an opponent's shirt. Materazzi was later criticised for his defending on both of Croatia's goals during the match.

=== UEFA Euro 2004 ===
Despite a long suspension with Inter, Materazzi was still called up by manager Giovanni Trapattoni for the UEFA Euro 2004, where he was on the bench for Italy's first two games but started in the final group game against Bulgaria in place of the suspended Fabio Cannavaro, as Italy came from behind to win 2–1; in the first half, Materazzi was judged to have allegedly fouled Dimitar Berbatov in the area, conceding a penalty, which Martin Petrov subsequently converted. Despite the win, Italy were eliminated in the first round on direct encounters, following a three-way five-point tie with Denmark and Sweden.

Materazzi played his first match as captain for Italy on 17 November 2004 in a 1–0 friendly win over Finland in which he also received a yellow card. His second and final match as captain came in another friendly against Iceland on 30 March 2005 where he played in the first half.

=== 2006 World Cup ===
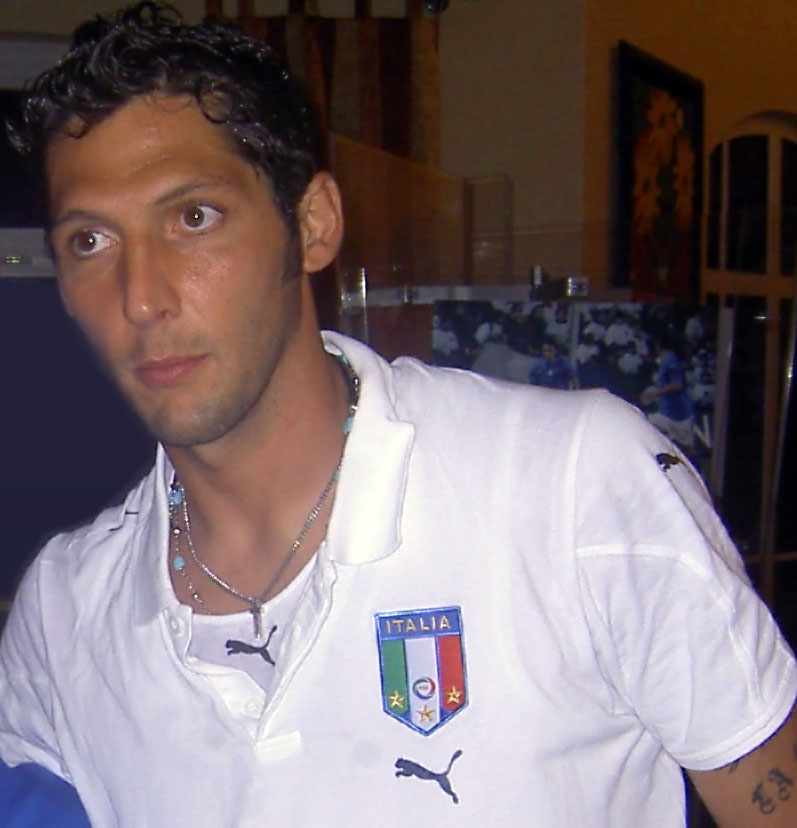
Materazzi in 2006, during the FIFA World Cup in Germany

Materazzi was included in the 23-man squad by manager Marcello Lippi for the 2006 FIFA World Cup which was his third major tournament. He began the tournament as a reserve player, but after Alessandro Nesta suffered an injury in the group match against the Czech Republic, Materazzi came on as his replacement and made an impact by scoring a goal, and was named Man of the Match. He received a red card in the round of 16 match against Australia for a foul on Mark Bresciano, which ended in a 1–0 win for the Italians, and was suspended for the quarter-final against Ukraine, which Italy won 3–0.

In the final against France, Materazzi fouled Florent Malouda to concede a penalty, which Zinedine Zidane subsequently scored. He made another impact by scoring a goal to tie the game, a header from a right sided corner by Andrea Pirlo. After the match went to extra-time, Materazzi and Zidane were involved in a confrontation in the 108th minute, where Materazzi verbally insulted Zidane while tugging his shirt as the latter attempted to walk away, which ended with Zidane headbutting Materazzi and receiving a red card. The game then continued to penalties. Materazzi scored Italy's second penalty as they defeated France 5–3 to claim their fourth FIFA World Cup.

After the final, the confrontation resulted in a major controversy as Zidane accused Materazzi of insulting his sister and mother. Additionally, Materazzi claimed that after he had grabbed Zidane's jersey, Zidane sarcastically said to him "If you want my shirt, I will give to you afterwards". Materazzi then revealed that he replied, "Preferisco la puttana di tua sorella" (I would prefer your whore of a sister), which resulted in the headbutt. Three British tabloid newspapers, the Daily Star, the Daily Mail and The Sun, alleged that Materazzi had called Zidane "the son of a terrorist whore." Materazzi took legal action against all three newspapers and the allegations were later withdrawn. FIFA later issued a CHF 5,000 fine and a two-match ban against Materazzi. Alongside striker Luca Toni, Materazzi was Italy's top scorer throughout the tournament with two goals; he also won 14 challenges throughout the competition. In 2010, Zidane had said that he would "rather die than apologise" to Materazzi for the headbutt in the final, but also admitted that he "could never have lived with himself" had he been allowed to remain on the pitch and help France win the match.

=== UEFA Euro 2008 ===
Under Roberto Donadoni, Materazzi appeared consistently during the Euro 2008 qualifying campaign and became a starter after Alessandro Nesta's retirement. In the UEFA Euro 2008 tournament, he started in the 3–0 loss to the Netherlands but was substituted in the 54th minute in what would later prove to be his final appearance for Italy, as he was replaced later in the tournament by Giorgio Chiellini. Later, after Lippi's return, Materazzi was not called in the national team again. He totaled 41 appearances and two goals for Italy.

== Style of play ==
An aggressive, physical, and hard-tackling centre-back, who was also known for his tight marking of opponents, Materazzi was considered to be one of the best defenders of his generation, and was highly regarded by two of the world's most respected coaches, Marcello Lippi and José Mourinho, later becoming close friends with both managers. Materazzi was lauded by his managers in particular for being a goal threat as a defender, due to his outstanding aerial ability, which made him dangerous during set pieces. His prolific goalscoring allowed him to capture the record for most goals in a Serie A season by a defender, which was broken during the 2000–01 season. He was also an accurate set piece and penalty kick taker, with a powerful shot from distance. In addition to these attributes, he had solid technical skills and reliable distribution, and was known for frequently playing long balls to the strikers. During his time with Inter Milan, he developed the nickname Matrix.

A controversial and provocative figure in football, he was also known for his very physical and aggressive style of play as a defender, as well as his tight marking and strong, harsh tackling, which led him to receive more than 60 yellow cards and 7 red cards throughout his playing career. Due to his temper and his heavy challenges, he has been involved in several altercations with other players during matches, throughout his career which drew him comparisons in the media with retired defender Pasquale Bruno. The Times placed Materazzi at number 45 in their list of the 50 hardest footballers in history.

== Personal life ==
Materazzi was born in Lecce, where his father, Giuseppe, a professional footballer, was playing for US Lecce. Giuseppe was also a former football coach and manager of teams such as Pisa, Lazio, Sporting CP and Tianjin TEDA. Materazzi's mother died when he was 15 years old. As stated by his father, Materazzi grew up a supporter of Lazio. His brother, Matteo, is a sports agent.

On June 23, 1997, Materazzi married Daniela and they have three children: Davide, Gianmarco and Anna. His sister Monia married Maurizio Maestrelli, the son of former manager Tommaso Maestrelli; Maurizio died on 28 November 2011. Monia's and Maurizio's son Alessio Maestrelli also became a footballer and made his professional debut in 2022.

In September 2007, Materazzi released his autobiography called Una vita da guerriero (The Life of a Warrior), published by journalists Andrea Elefante (from Gazzetta dello Sport) and Roberto De Ponti (from Corriere della Sera).

== Career statistics ==
=== Club ===
Club statistics
Club	Season	League			Cup		Continental		Other		Total	
Club	Season	Division	Apps	Goals	Apps	Goals	Apps	Goals	Apps	Goals	Apps	Goals
Messina	1990–91	Serie B	1	0	0	0	—		—		1	0
Tor di Quinto	1991–92	Serie D	0	0	0	0	—		—		0	0
Tor di Quinto	1992–93	Serie D	12	0	0	0	—		—		12	0
Tor di Quinto	Total		12	0	0	0	—		—		12	0
Marsala	1993–94	Serie D	25	4	0	0	—		—		25	4
Trapani	1994–95	Serie C	13	2	0	0	—		—		13	2
Perugia	1995–96	Serie B	1	0	0	0	—		—		1	0
Perugia	1996–97	Serie A	14	2	0	0	—		—		14	2
Perugia	1997–98	Serie B	33	5	2	0	—		—		35	5
Perugia	Total		47	7	2	0	—		—		49	7
Carpi (loan)	1996–97	Serie C	18	7	0	0	—		—		18	7
Everton	1998–99	Premier League	27	1	6 (Note: Two appearances in FA Cup, four appearances and one goal in EFL Cup)	1	—		—		33	2
Perugia	1999–2000	Serie A	21	3	2	0	1 (Note: All appearance(s) in UEFA Intertoto Cup)	0	—		24	3
Perugia	2000–01	Serie A	30	12	2	0	1	0	—		33	12
Perugia	Total		51	15	4	0	2	0	—		57	15
Inter Milan	2001–02	Serie A	23	1	1	0	8 (Note: All appearance(s) in UEFA Cup)	1	—		32	2
Inter Milan	2002–03	Serie A	20	1	0	0	13 (Note: All appearance(s) in UEFA Champions League)	0	—		33	1
Inter Milan	2003–04	Serie A	14	3	0	0	4	0	—		18	3
Inter Milan	2004–05	Serie A	26	0	5	0	9	0	—		40	0
Inter Milan	2005–06	Serie A	22	2	6	0	10	0	1 (Note: Appearance in Supercoppa Italiana)	0	39	2
Inter Milan	2006–07	Serie A	28	10	2	0	6	0	1	0	39	10
Inter Milan	2007–08	Serie A	23	1	4	0	3	0	1	0	33	1
Inter Milan	2008–09	Serie A	8	0	2	0	5	1	0	0	15	1
Inter Milan	2009–10	Serie A	12	0	4	0	4	0	0	0	20	0
Inter Milan	2010–11	Serie A	8	0	1	0	1	0	1	0	11	0
Inter Milan	Total		184	18	25	0	63	2	4	0	276	20
Chennaiyin	2014	Indian Super League	7	0	0	0	—		—		7	0
Career total			385	55	37	1	65	2	4	0	491	58

=== International ===
Appearances and goals by national team and year
National team	Year	Apps	Goals
Italy	2001	4	0
Italy	2002	5	0
Italy	2003	1	0
Italy	2004	8	0
Italy	2005	7	0
Italy	2006	10	2
Italy	2007	4	0
Italy	2008	2	0
Total		41	2

Italy score listed first, score column indicates score after each Materazzi goal.

International goals by date, venue, cap, opponent, score, result and competition
No.	Date	Venue	Cap	Opponent	Score	Result	Competition
1	22 June 2006	Volksparkstadion, Hamburg, Germany	29	Czech Republic	1–0	2–0	2006 FIFA World Cup
2	9 July 2006	Olympiastadion, Berlin, Germany	32	France	1–1	1–1 (5–3 p)	2006 FIFA World Cup

=== Managerial ===
All competitive league games (league and domestic cup) and international matches (including friendlies) are included.

As of 2 December 2016

Team	Nat	Year	Record				
Team	Nat	Year	G	W	D	L	Win %
Chennaiyin	(India)	2014–2016	47	19	12	16	40.43
Career Total			47	19	12	16	40.43

== Honours ==
=== Player ===
Inter Milan

- Serie A: 2005–06, 2006–07, 2007–08, 2008–09, 2009–10
- Coppa Italia: 2004–05, 2005–06, 2009–10, 2010–11
- Supercoppa Italiana: 2005, 2006, 2010
- UEFA Champions League: 2009–10
- FIFA Club World Cup: 2010

Italy

- FIFA World Cup: 2006

==== Individual ====
- Serie A Defender of the Year: 2007
- ESM Team of the Year: 2006–07
- FIFPro World XI Nominee: 2006, 2007
- Inter Milan Hall of Fame: 2021

=== Manager ===
Chennaiyin

- Indian Super League: 2015

=== Orders ===
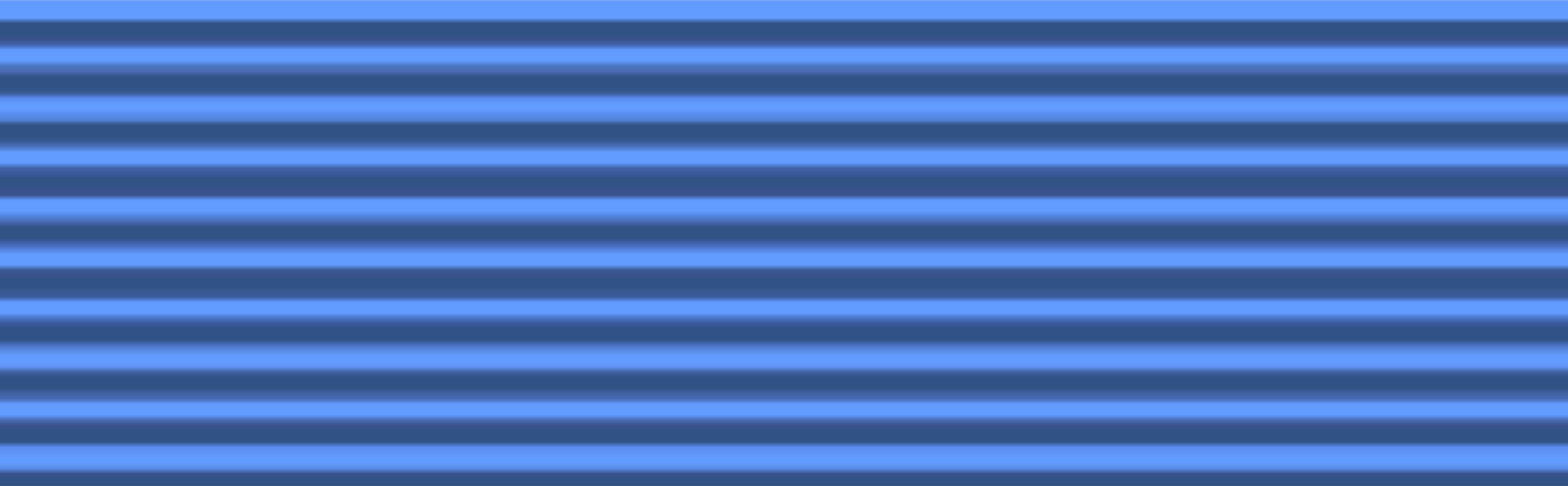
- CONI: Golden Collar of Sports Merit: 2006

- 4th Class / Officer: Ufficiale Ordine al Merito della Repubblica Italiana: 2006
