= Alessandro Nesta =

Italian footballer and coach (born 1976)

Alessandro Nesta OMRI
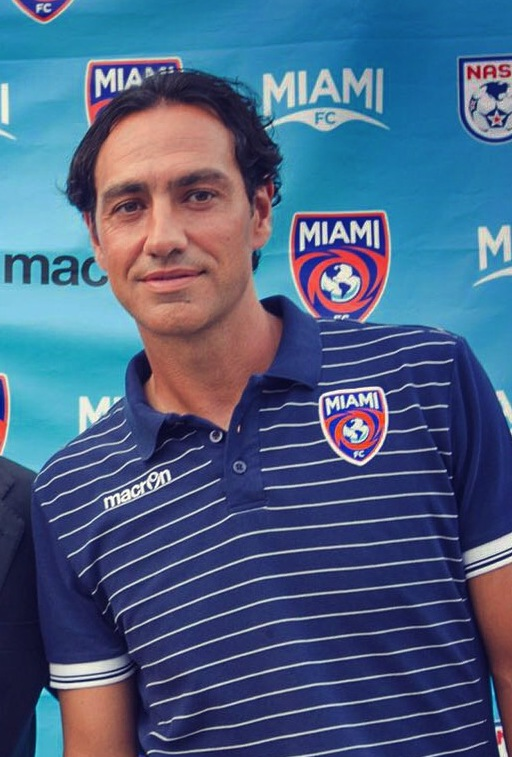
- Nesta with Miami FC in 2016

Personal information
- Full name: Alessandro Nesta
- Date of birth: 19 March 1976 (age 50)
- Place of birth: Rome, Italy
- Height: 1.87 m (6 ft 2 in)
- Position: Centre back

Team information
- Current team: Avellino (head coach)

Youth career
- 1985–1993: Lazio

Senior career*
Years	Team	Apps	(Gls)
1993–2002	Lazio	193	(1)
2002–2012	AC Milan	224	(7)
2012–2014	Montreal Impact	31	(0)
2014	Chennaiyin	3	(0)
Total		451	(8)

International career
1995–1996	Italy U21	9	(1)
1996–2006	Italy	78	(0)

Managerial career
- 2015–2017: Miami FC
- 2018–2019: Perugia
- 2019–2021: Frosinone
- 2023–2024: Reggiana
- 2024: Monza
- 2025: Monza
- 2026–: Avellino
Medal record
Men's football
Representing Italy
FIFA World Cup
Winner	2006
UEFA European Championship
Runner-up	2000
UEFA European Under-21 Championship
Winner	1996
- * Club domestic league appearances and goals

Alessandro Nesta (Italian pronunciation: [alesˈsandro ˈnɛsta]; born 19 March 1976) is an Italian professional football manager and former player who played as a centre-back. He is currently the head coach of Serie B club Avellino. Widely considered as one of the greatest defenders of all time, Nesta was known for his pace, artistic tackles, elegance on the ball, distribution and tight marking of opponents.

Nesta made over 400 Serie A appearances in a 20-year career spread between Lazio and AC Milan, winning domestic and European honours with both clubs. Later in his career, he played in Major League Soccer (MLS) for the Montreal Impact, and for Chennaiyin of the Indian Super League. Nesta is a four-time Serie A Defender of the Year and a four-time member of the annual UEFA Team of the Year. In 2004, he was named as one of the Top 100 greatest living footballers as part of FIFA's 100th anniversary celebration. In 2021, he was inducted into the Italian Football Hall of Fame.

Nesta was a member of the Italy national team for a decade from his debut in 1996, earning 78 caps in total. At international level, he competed at the 1996 Olympics, three UEFA European Championships, and three FIFA World Cups. Nesta was a member of the Italian team that won the 2006 World Cup, and he also represented the Italian side that reached the final of Euro 2000.

== Club career ==
=== Lazio ===
Nesta was first discovered by Francesco Rocca, a scout for Roma, but his father, a Lazio fan, turned down the offer. He began his youth career with Lazio in 1985, playing in various roles, including as a striker and midfielder, before being placed in the role of a defender. In the 1993–94 season he was called up to the first team, and on 13 March 1994 he made his debut in a 2–2 away draw against Udinese; Nesta came on for Pierluigi Casiraghi during the 78th minute.

He assumed the team captaincy in 1997 under Sven-Göran Eriksson, and helped Lazio win the 1998 Coppa Italia against AC Milan in the final 3–2 on aggregate, in which he scored the decisive goal in the second leg. He would also make the UEFA Cup Final that season, losing out 3–0 to Inter Milan. Nesta was awarded the Serie A Young Footballer of the Year Award at the 1998 Italian footballing awards for his performance throughout the season.

The following year he was forced to stay out for nearly half the season due to ligament injuries suffered during the 1998 FIFA World Cup. He returned to the field in December, and, as captain, led Lazio in the title race, lost by a single point on the final day of the season. He did, however, win the first two trophies at the international level of his team: the UEFA Cup Winners' Cup, won against Mallorca, and, in August, the European Super Cup over Manchester United.

In the 1999–2000 season he led Lazio to the Scudetto and Coppa Italia, winning the double. During the 2000–01 season, under Dino Zoff, Lazio won the Supercoppa Italiana and finished third in Serie A. Nesta's performances and success for Lazio during this period earned him three consecutive Serie A Defender of the Year awards between 2000 and 2002. Financial problems for Lazio and its then-president Sergio Cragnotti led to the sale of Nesta to Milan in 2002. Nesta left the club with a backlog salary of €2 million, half of which were converted into shares of the Biancocelesti club. He is considered to be one of the best Lazio defenders.

=== AC Milan ===
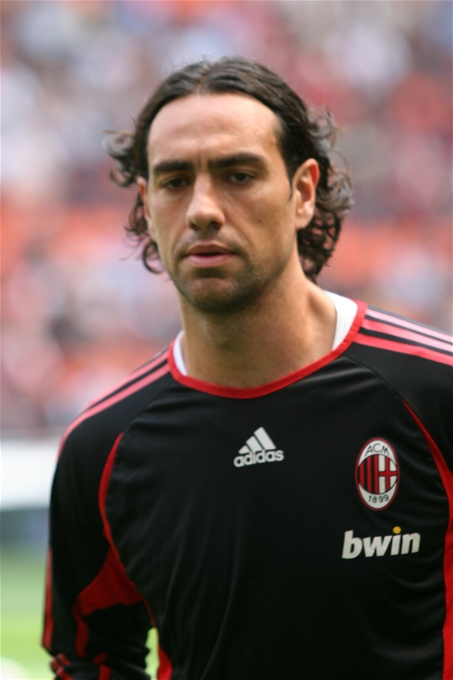
Nesta with AC Milan in 2007

Just before the 2002–03 Serie A campaign, financial woes forced Lazio to sell many of their best players, including Nesta, who transferred to Milan for €30,987,000 (60 billion lire). During this time, he would form a formidable defensive line alongside Paolo Maldini, Cafu, Alessandro Costacurta and Jaap Stam, among others. Nesta's first two seasons with the Rossoneri were very successful. During the 2002–03 season, he won the Champions League for the first time in his career as Milan defeated rivals Juventus at Old Trafford in the first all-Italian Champions League final in history. Nesta helped Milan keep a clean sheet during the match, which went to a penalty shootout following a 0–0 deadlock after extra time. Nesta was able to score his penalty kick as Milan won the shootout 3–2. Nesta also won the Coppa Italia over Roma during his first season at the club, while Milan finished third in Serie A that season. Nesta was once again awarded the Serie A Defender of the Year award for his performances, and was elected to be part of the UEFA Team of the Year.

The following season, Milan lost both the 2003 Supercoppa Italiana to Juventus and the Intercontinental Cup final to Boca Juniors, on penalties. Nesta managed to win the European Super Cup with Milan against Porto, however, and captured his second Scudetto that season, during which Milan set an Italian record for points won in a 34–match Serie A season (82). Milan were eliminated in the quarter-finals of the Champions League by Deportivo La Coruña, and in the semi-finals of the Coppa Italia, to eventual winners Lazio, although Nesta managed to score a goal in the quarter-final match against Roma. Nesta was once again elected to be part of the UEFA Team of the Year, for the third consecutive season.

Nesta began the next season by defeating his former team Lazio to capture the 2004 Supercoppa Italiana. Milan also reached the Champion's League final in 2005, losing to Liverpool on penalties, while in Serie A, they finished behind champions Juventus. Despite finishing second in both Serie A and the Champions League, Nesta was elected to the 2005 FIFPro World XI for the first time in his career, for his performances.

During the 2005–06 AC Milan season, Milan once again finished behind Juventus in Serie A, although both Juventus and Milan were later deducted points for being involved in the 2006 matchfixing scandal, and the title was awarded to Internazionale; Juventus were relegated while Milan finishing in third place after the point deduction. Milan also reached the semi-finals of the Champions League in 2006, losing out to eventual champions Barcelona, while they were eliminated in the quarter-finals of the Coppa Italia.

Despite missing most of the 2006–07 season due to a shoulder injury, Nesta played a vital part in Milan's return to the 2007 Champions League final, where Milan avenged their 2005 final loss, defeating Liverpool 2–1 in Athens. Despite Milan's point deduction during the season, Nesta was also able to return from injury in time to help Milan manage a fourth-place finish in Serie A, clinching the final Champions League spot. Nesta was elected to be part of both the UEFA Team of the Year and the FIFPro World XI for his performances that season.

Nesta won his third European Super Cup in August 2007 when Milan defeated Sevilla 3–1. Nesta signed a contract extension that would keep him at Milan until 2011. Nesta went on to score his first goal for Milan since April 2006 in a 1–1 draw with Siena on 15 September 2007. He followed this up with an important goal for Milan in the 4–2 victory over Boca Juniors in the final of the 2007 FIFA Club World Cup. Milan would disappoint throughout the rest of the season, however, finishing fifth in Serie A, and being eliminated in the round of 16 of the UEFA Champions League and the Coppa Italia.

Serious back injuries forced Nesta out of action for the whole 2008–09 season, which raised concerns about his chances to make a comeback into active football. He fully recovered from his injuries and came on as 77th-minute substitute in Milan's final Serie A away match to Fiorentina on 31 May 2009 for his first competitive appearance of the season. Milan finished the domestic season in third place, qualifying for the Champions League.

The following season Nesta scored his first brace for Milan in a 2–1 victory over Chievo in the Serie A on 25 October 2009. He began to re-emerge as a starter for the club and was one of Milan's most consistent players throughout the entire 2009–10 season under Leonardo, as the team finished third in Serie A. Nesta continued his excellent partnership with fellow centre-back Thiago Silva throughout the 2010–11 season under Massimiliano Allegri, forming a formidable defensive pairing, conceding just 24 goals in 38 games during Milan's victorious Serie A campaign. Milan also managed to reach the semi-finals of the Coppa Italia, but were once again disappointingly eliminated in the round of 16 of the Champions League. Throughout the 2010–11 season, speculation indicated that Nesta would retire at the end of the season. However, he later confirmed that he wanted to play one more season at Milan before retiring and signed a contract extension on 18 May 2011, which kept him on Milan's squad until summer 2012. Nesta was elected to be part of the Serie A Team of the Year for his performances during Milan's successful title run that season.

Nesta began his final season with Milan by winning the 2011 Supercoppa Italiana on 6 August 2011, defeating city rivals Inter Milan 2–1 in Beijing. Milan finished second to Juventus in Serie A that season, and were eliminated in the semi-finals of the Coppa Italia and the quarter-finals of the Champions League. On 10 May, during a press conference, Nesta announced his retirement from Serie A at the end of the season. Three days later, on 13 May 2012, Nesta played his farewell game for Milan, in a 2–1 home win against Novara on the last matchday of the season; having come on as a second half substitute for Alberto Aquilani, Nesta assumed his regista role and played as a defensive midfielder instead of his usual position in central defense. During his ten seasons at the Milanese club, Nesta collected 325 caps, scoring 10 goals. With Milan, he won two Serie A titles, a Coppa Italia, two Supercoppa Italiana, two Champions Leagues, two UEFA Super Cups and a FIFA Club World Cup.

=== Montreal Impact ===
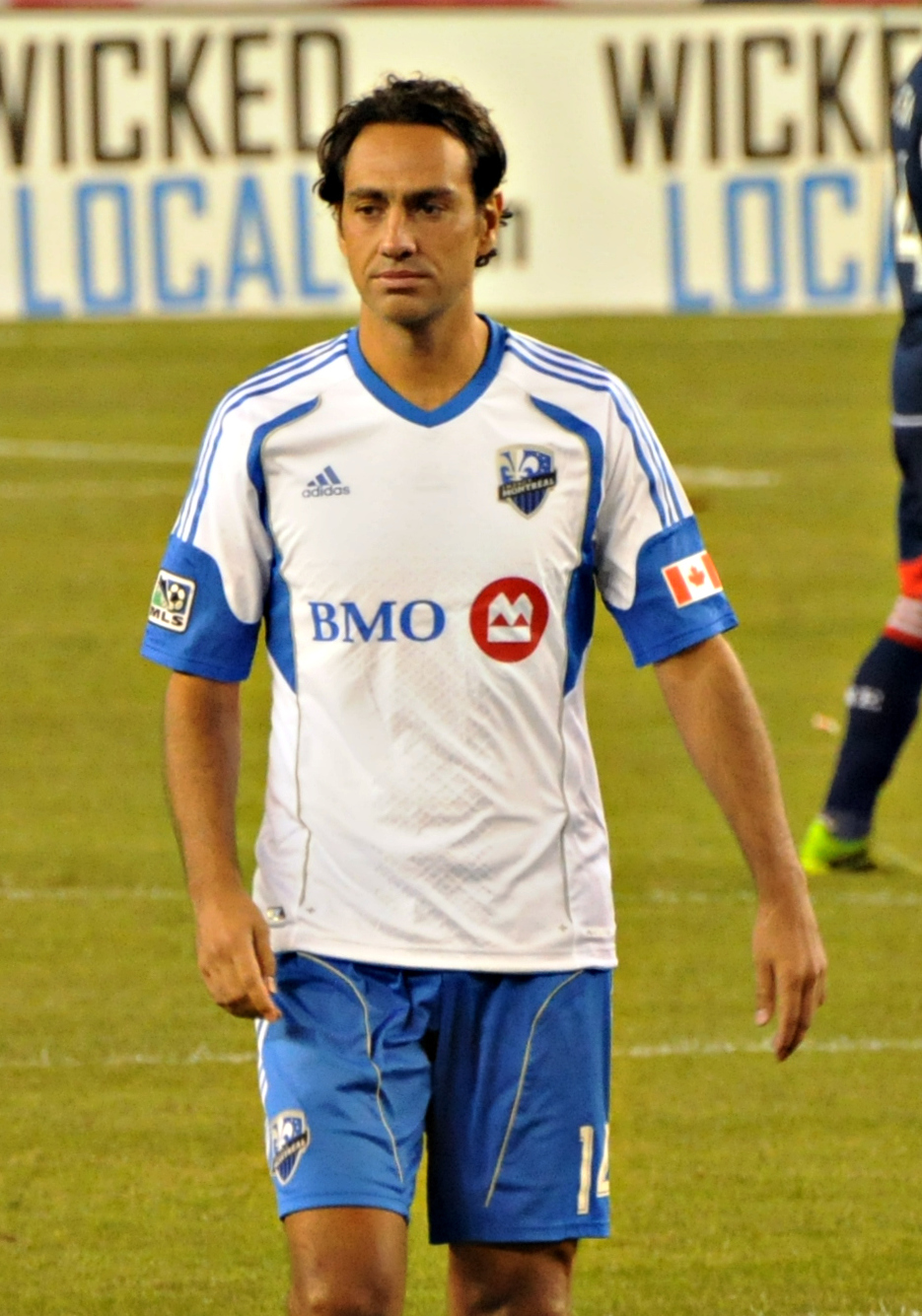
Nesta with Montreal Impact in 2013

On 5 July 2012, Nesta signed a contract with the Montreal Impact of Major League Soccer (MLS). He signed an 18-month contract on a free transfer. The club also stated he would not be signed as a designated player. Nesta made his Impact debut against Lyon in a friendly match on 24 July. He made his competitive debut three days later, in a 3–1 home win over the New York Red Bulls. In 2013, Nesta won his first and only title with Montreal Impact: the Canadian Championship.

On 20 October 2013, Nesta announced that he would be retiring at the conclusion of the 2013 MLS Cup Playoffs after playing parts of two seasons with the Impact.

=== Chennaiyin ===
On 28 November 2014, it was announced that Nesta had signed for Chennaiyin FC of the Indian Super League for the remainder of the 2014 season. He was signed by Marco Materazzi, his former international defensive partner. He made his debut on 9 December in a 2–2 draw against Delhi Dynamos, partnering Mikaël Silvestre in central defence in Chennaiyin's last match of the regular season in which they topped the league.

== International career ==
=== Youth ===
Nesta began his career for Italy and was a member of the under-21 squad that won the 1996 UEFA European Under-21 Football Championship; in the final against Spain, following a 1–1 draw, he took Italy's fourth penalty in an eventual 4–2 shoot-out victory. A few months later, he was named to Italy's UEFA Euro 1996 squad in England by Arrigo Sacchi, but did not come off the bench as Italy were eliminated in the group stage by eventual finalists Germany and the Czech Republic. Later that year, he took part at the Summer Olympics in Atlanta with the under-21 side, where Italy were eliminated in the first round.

=== Senior ===
==== Early senior career ====
On 5 October 1996, Nesta debuted for the Italy national football team under Cesare Maldini during a 1998 FIFA World Cup qualification, in a 3–1 away victory against Moldova. At the final tournament, Nesta played in all three group games, playing alongside Paolo Maldini, Fabio Cannavaro, Alessandro Costacurta and Giuseppe Bergomi, helping Italy keep a clean sheet against Cameroon. However, he did not make further appearances due to injury as Italy was eliminated by the hosts and eventual champions France on penalties in the quarter-finals.

==== UEFA Euro 2000 ====
After featuring in defence for Italy during the Euro 2000 qualifying campaign under Dino Zoff, Nesta featured in the Italian starting lineup at Euro 2000, partnering with Paolo Maldini and Fabio Cannavaro in defence throughout most of the tournament. Italy only conceded two goals en route to the final, and kept three clean sheets throughout the tournament; the first coming against co-hosts Belgium in the group stage, and the second against Romania in the quarter-finals, in which he was named man of the match.

In the semi-final, a ten-man Italy overcame co-hosts the Netherlands in a penalty shootout, after a 0–0 deadlock following extra time. Italy advanced to the final where they faced defending World Cup Champions France. Following a goal by Marco Delvecchio in the 55th minute, Italy led the match 1–0 until the final minute of stoppage time, when Sylvain Wiltord scored the equaliser. David Trezeguet then scored the golden goal in extra time for France to defeat the Italians in the second consecutive tournament, as the Italians finished the Euro as runners-up. Nesta, along with his defensive partners Maldini and Cannavaro, was elected to be part of the team of the tournament for his performances.

==== 2002 FIFA World Cup ====
After Euro 2000, Nesta remained a first-choice centre-back for Italy under new manager Giovanni Trapattoni, featuring extensively during the 2002 World Cup qualifying campaign. During the 2002 World Cup, he partnered Fabio Cannavaro in central defence, keeping a clean sheet in the opening win against Ecuador, but once again, injury kept him from playing in the second round, and Nesta did not feature in the controversial second-round defeat to co-hosts South Korea. Nesta featured prominently as Italy topped their Euro 2004 qualifying group. However, Italy's disappointment at major tournaments continued at Euro 2004, where they were eliminated in the first round following a three-way five-point tie with Denmark and Sweden, only to be eliminated on direct encounters. Nesta managed to stay injury free and played for a full 90 minutes in all three group games, helping Italy to keep a clean sheet in the opening draw against Denmark.

==== 2006 FIFA World Cup victory and retirement ====
Following two successive disappointments, newly-appointed coach Marcello Lippi kept Nesta in the starting lineup as Italy was on top of their qualification group to the 2006 World Cup. Despite starting the final tournament strongly, helping Italy to keep a clean sheet in their opening win over Ghana, the World Cup turned out to be a personal disappointment for Nesta, as an injury in the final group game against the Czech Republic, which Italy won 2–0, put him on the sidelines while Italy went on to win the trophy. After the World Cup, Nesta made one appearance in the Euro 2008 qualifiers, in a 3–1 away win against Georgia on 11 October 2006, but continuous injuries forced him to retire from the international team. Prior to the final tournament, Nesta rejected Roberto Donadoni's invitation to return to the national team. Two years later, he similarly turned down an invitation from Marcello Lippi prior to the 2010 World Cup. He made 78 appearances for Italy in total.

== Managerial career ==
=== Miami ===
On 31 August 2015, Nesta was introduced as the first head coach of the newly formed Miami FC, which began play in the North American Soccer League (NASL) in April 2016. After finishing a combined 7th place in his first season, Miami FC finished in first place in his second, as Spring and Fall champions of the 2017 NASL season. However, the team were defeated in the season playoffs semifinal round to the New York Cosmos following a 6–5 loss in the penalty shootout after a goalless draw. He resigned as coach following the completion of the 2017 season, on 17 November.

=== Perugia ===
On 14 May 2018, Nesta was appointed manager of Perugia. After a 4–1 loss to Verona in the 2018–19 Serie B promotion playoffs, Nesta parted with Perugia on 21 May 2019.

=== Frosinone ===
On 17 June 2019, Nesta was appointed manager of Frosinone on a two-year contract. The team finished the 2019–20 Serie B season in 8th, just making it into the playoffs. They lost the playoff final to Spezia after a 1–1 aggregate draw, as the opponents had performed better in the regular season. On 22 March 2021, Nesta was sacked.

=== Reggiana ===
On 13 June 2023, Nesta was appointed manager of Reggiana on a one-year contract. His team finished 11th in Serie B in his only season.

=== Monza ===
On 12 June 2024, Serie A side Monza announced the appointment of Nesta as head coach, starting from 1 July. He replaced Raffaele Palladino, who had left for Fiorentina after helping the team to 12th place in their second season in the top flight. He missed the first game of the season against Empoli due to suspension, debuting on 24 August with a 1–0 home loss to a Genoa team led by fellow 2006 World Cup winner Alberto Gilardino.

On 23 December 2024, Nesta was removed from his coaching post with immediate effect following a 1–2 loss to Juventus, the club's third consecutive loss, which left Monza at the bottom of the league table with just 10 points after 17 games.

However, on 10 February 2025, Nesta was again reappointed as AC Monza's head coach just 7 weeks after being sacked.

=== Avellino ===
On 11 June 2026, Nesta was announced as the new head coach of Serie B club Avellino, signing a two-year contract.

== Style of play ==
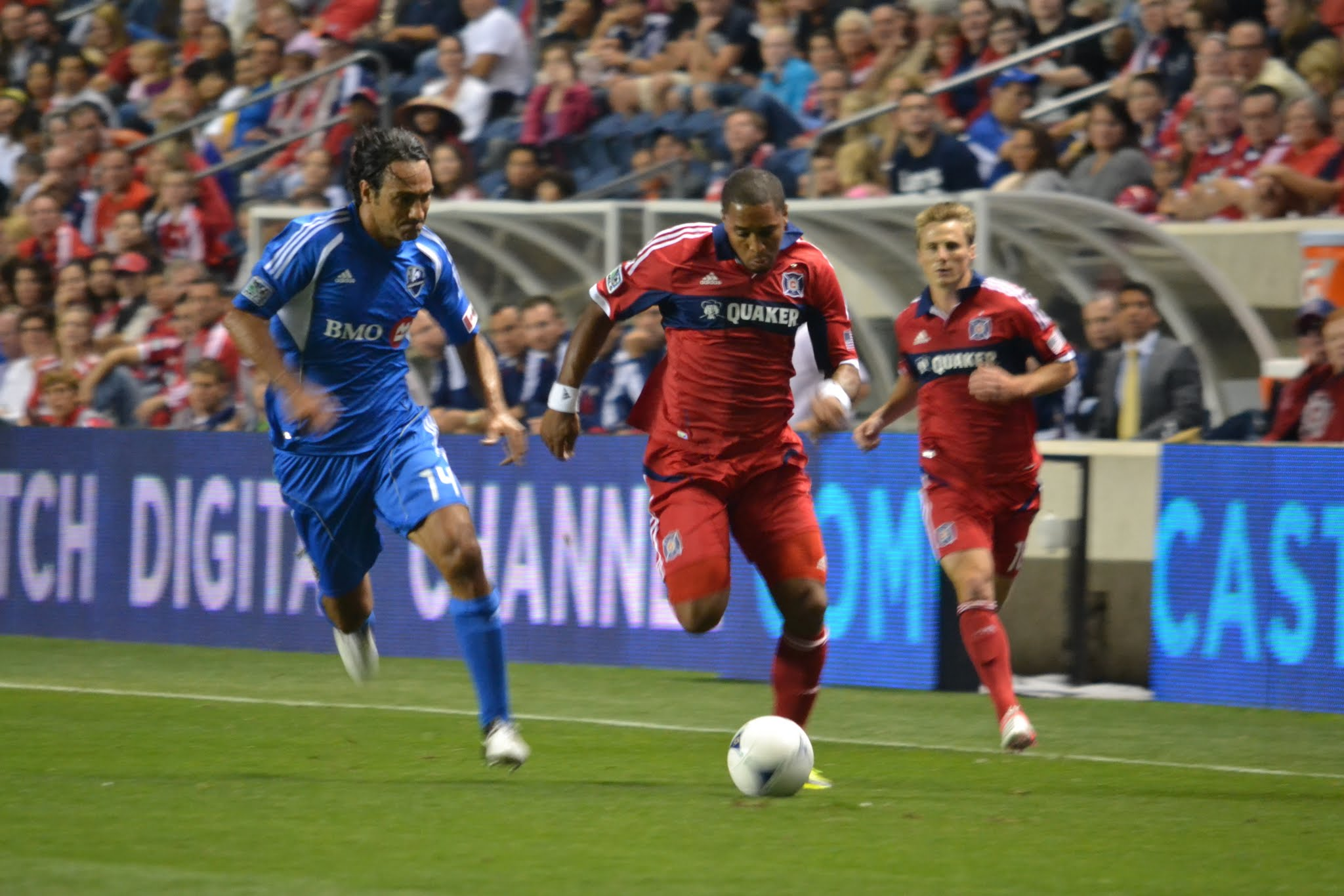
Nesta pursuing Sherjill MacDonald of the Chicago Fire in September 2012

Nesta was a defender, who was influential both at club and international level, and who is regarded as being one of the greatest and most talented defenders of his generation. While possessing a strong and imposing defensive, athletic and physical presence, he was noted for his agility, ball skills, vision, and passing ability., which allowed him to bring the ball out of the defence and start plays from the back after winning back possession; these abilities led him to be compared to former Milan captain Franco Baresi.

Although Nesta was usually deployed as a centre-back during his career, he initially started out as a right-sided full-back; his technical skills, athleticism and defensive ability made him a versatile player from a tactical standpoint, who was capable of playing anywhere along the backline, and also allowed him to be deployed on the left, or even as a sweeper on occasion. Nesta was also excellent in the air, and was unusually quick for a centreback; he often stood out throughout his career for his pace, acceleration, and stamina.

In addition to his class, as well as his technical and physical abilities, Nesta also possessed an excellent positional and tactical sense, as well as an acute capacity to read the game, which enabled him to anticipate and close down opponents in one on one situations, and prevent attacking plays; his defensive intelligence enabled him to maintain a consistently high level of performance even towards the end of his career, as he lost his pace and stamina. Due to his ability to lead from the back and organise his teammates, he excelled in a zonal marking system, but was also known for his tight marking of opposing players. An accurate and tenacious ball-winner, he was known for his artistic sliding tackles, acrobatic clearances, and ability to time his challenges well. Despite his talent, Nesta's career suffered from the many injuries he encountered, which hindered him from playing in the knockout stages at each of the three World Cups at which he participated.

== Personal life ==
On 7 May 2007, Nesta married his fiancée, Gabriela Pagnozzi, in a civil ceremony in Milan; the religious ceremony followed on 30 May 2007. Gabriela was working for Casa Italia, the Italy national team headquarters, during the 1998 World Cup. Their relationship was born when she tended to him following his injury against Austria. "I can say, I got the injury and her in France then. And the injury has gone, [but] she has stayed with me." The couple has three children, Sofia, Tommaso and Angelica. His nephew Gian Marco Nesta is also a professional footballer.

== Media ==
Nesta appeared in the 1998 Italian film Paparazzi, directed by Neri Parenti. He was also on the cover of the Italian edition of SCEE's This is Football 2002. Nesta features in EA Sports' FIFA football video game series; he has been included as an Ultimate Team Legend/Icon since FIFA 16.

== Career statistics ==
=== Club ===
Appearances and goals by club, season and competition
Club	Season	League			National cup (Note: Includes Coppa Italia, Canadian Championship)		Continental		Other		Total	
Club	Season	Division	Apps	Goals	Apps	Goals	Apps	Goals	Apps	Goals	Apps	Goals
Lazio	1993–94	Serie A	2	0	0	0	0	0	–		2	0
Lazio	1994–95	Serie A	11	0	1	0	0	0	–		12	0
Lazio	1995–96	Serie A	23	0	2	0	3 (Note: Appearances in UEFA Cup)	0	–		28	0
Lazio	1996–97	Serie A	25	0	4	0	4	0	–		33	0
Lazio	1997–98	Serie A	30	0	9	1	10	1	–		49	2
Lazio	1998–99	Serie A	20	1	2	0	4 (Note: Appearances in UEFA Cup Winners' Cup)	0	–		26	1
Lazio	1999–2000	Serie A	28	0	2	0	9 (Note: Appearances in UEFA Champions League)	0	1 (Note: Appearance in UEFA Super Cup)	0	40	0
Lazio	2000–01	Serie A	29	0	1	0	8	0	1 (Note: Appearance in Supercoppa Italiana)	0	39	0
Lazio	2001–02	Serie A	25	0	1	0	6	0	–		32	0
Lazio	Total		193	1	22	1	44	1	2	0	261	3
AC Milan	2002–03	Serie A	29	1	5	1	14	0	–		48	2
AC Milan	2003–04	Serie A	26	0	4	1	6	0	2 (Note: One appearance in Supercoppa Italiana, one appearance in UEFA Super Cup)	0	38	1
AC Milan	2004–05	Serie A	29	0	3	0	12	0	1	0	45	0
AC Milan	2005–06	Serie A	30	1	2	0	10	0	–		42	1
AC Milan	2006–07	Serie A	14	0	0	0	8	0	–		22	0
AC Milan	2007–08	Serie A	29	1	0	0	7	0	3 (Note: One appearance in UEFA Super Cup, two appearances and one goal in FIFA Club World Cup)	1	39	2
AC Milan	2008–09	Serie A	1	0	0	0	0	0	–		1	0
AC Milan	2009–10	Serie A	23	3	0	0	7	0	–		30	3
AC Milan	2010–11	Serie A	26	0	2	0	7	0	–		35	0
AC Milan	2011–12	Serie A	17	1	1	0	7	0	1	0	26	1
AC Milan	Total		224	7	17	2	78	0	7	1	326	10
Montreal Impact	2012	MLS	8	0	–		–		–		8	0
Montreal Impact	2013	MLS	23	0	2	0	1 (Note: Appearance in CONCACAF Champions League)	0	–		26	0
Montreal Impact	Total		31	0	2	0	1	0	0	0	34	0
Chennaiyin	2014	Indian Super League	3	0	—		—		—		3	0
Career total			451	8	41	3	123	1	9	1	624	13

=== International ===
Appearances and goals by national team and year
National team	Year	Apps	Goals
Italy	1996	2	0
Italy	1997	7	0
Italy	1998	7	0
Italy	1999	6	0
Italy	2000	13	0
Italy	2001	5	0
Italy	2002	10	0
Italy	2003	7	0
Italy	2004	10	0
Italy	2005	5	0
Italy	2006	6	0
Total		78	0

== Managerial statistics ==
As of match played 22 November 2026

Managerial record by team and tenure
Team	Nat	From	To	Record							
Team	Nat	From	To	G	W	D	L	GF	GA	GD	Win %
Miami FC	(United States)	31 August 2015	17 November 2017	71	35	17	19	111	78	+33	49.30
Perugia	(Italy)	14 May 2018	21 May 2019	40	14	8	18	52	61	−9	35.00
Frosinone	(Italy)	17 June 2019	22 March 2021	77	28	23	26	86	84	+2	36.36
Reggiana	(Italy)	13 June 2023	12 June 2024	39	10	17	12	39	47	−8	25.64
Monza	(Italy)	12 June 2024	23 December 2024	20	2	8	10	18	28	−10	10.00
Monza	(Italy)	12 February 2025	30 June 2025	14	1	2	11	7	30	−23	7.14
Avellino	(Italy)	1 July 2026	present	13	5	4	4	20	15	+5	38.46
Total				273	95	79	99	332	341	−9	34.80

== Honours ==
=== Player ===
Lazio

- Serie A: 1999–2000
- Coppa Italia: 1997–98, 1999–2000
- Supercoppa Italiana: 2000
- UEFA Cup Winners' Cup: 1998–99
- UEFA Super Cup: 1999

AC Milan

- Serie A: 2003–04, 2010–11
- Coppa Italia: 2002–03
- Supercoppa Italiana: 2004, 2011
- UEFA Champions League: 2002–03, 2006–07
- UEFA Super Cup: 2003, 2007
- FIFA Club World Cup: 2007

Montreal Impact

- Canadian Championship: 2013

Italy U-21

- UEFA Under-21 European Championship: 1996

Italy

- FIFA World Cup: 2006
- UEFA European Championship runner-up: 2000

Individual

- Serie A Young Footballer of the Year: 1998
- Serie A Defender of the Year: 2000, 2001, 2002, 2003
- Serie A Team of the Year: 2010–11
- UEFA European Championship Team of the Tournament: 2000
- UEFA Team of the Year: 2002, 2003, 2004, 2007
- ESM Team of the Year: 2000–01
- Onze de Onze: 2001, 2002, 2003, 2004
- FIFPro World XI: 2005, 2007
- FIFA 100
- UEFA Golden Jubilee Poll: No. 47
- AC Milan Hall of Fame
- All-time UEFA European Under-21 Championship dream team: 2015
- UEFA Ultimate Team of the Year (published 2015)
- Italian Football Hall of Fame: 2021

=== Manager ===
Miami

- North American Soccer League: 2017 Spring/Fall champions

=== Orders ===

5th Class / Knight: Cavaliere Ordine al Merito della Repubblica Italiana: 2000

4th Class / Officer: Ufficiale Ordine al Merito della Repubblica Italiana: 2006

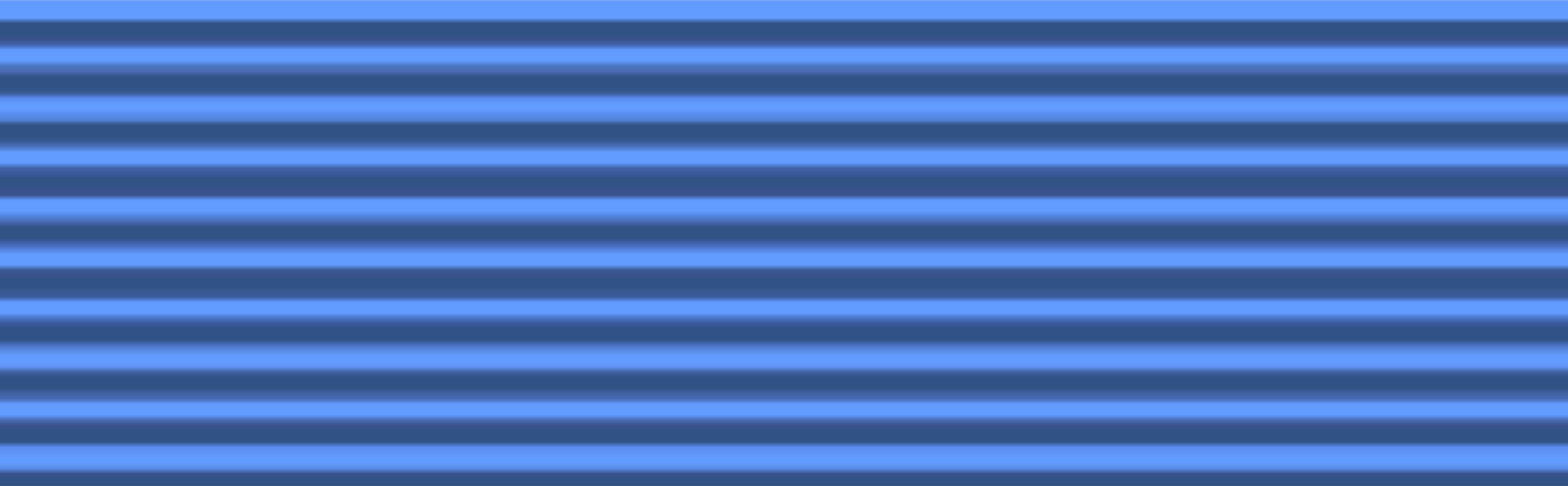

CONI: Golden Collar of Sports Merit: 2006
