= Serie A Defender of the Year =

Former Italian Footballers' Association award

AIC Serie A Defender of the Year
- Sport: Association football
- Competition: Serie A
- Awarded for: Defender considered to have performed the best in each given Serie A season
- Local name: Migliore difensore AIC (Italian)
- Country: Italy
- Presented by: Italian Footballers' Association (AIC)

History
- First award: 2000
- Editions: 11
- Final award: 2010
- First winner: (Italy) Alessandro Nesta (2000)
- Most wins: (Italy) Alessandro Nesta (4 times)
- Most recent: (Italy) Giorgio Chiellini; (Argentina) Walter Samuel; (2010)
- Website: Official website

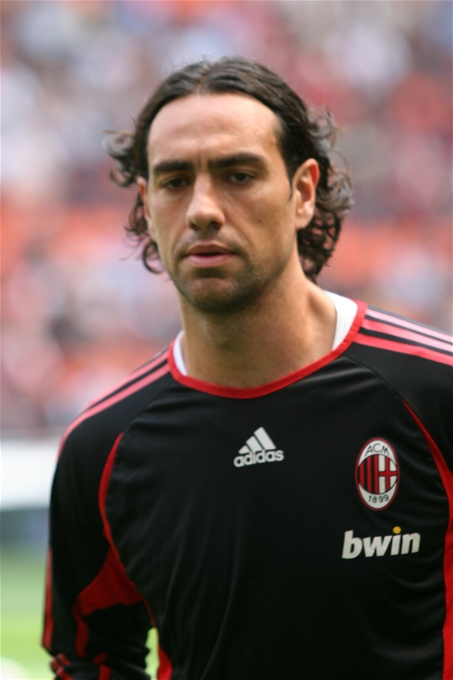
Alessandro Nesta, who has won the award a record four times

The AIC Serie A Defender of the Year (Italian: Migliore difensore AIC) was a yearly award organized by the Italian Footballers' Association (AIC) from 2000 to 2010 as part of the Oscar del Calcio awards event, given to the defender who was considered to have performed the best over the previous Serie A season.

Since 2011, the best defenders are chosen as part of the Serie A Team of the Year award within the Gran Galà del Calcio awards event.

== Winners ==
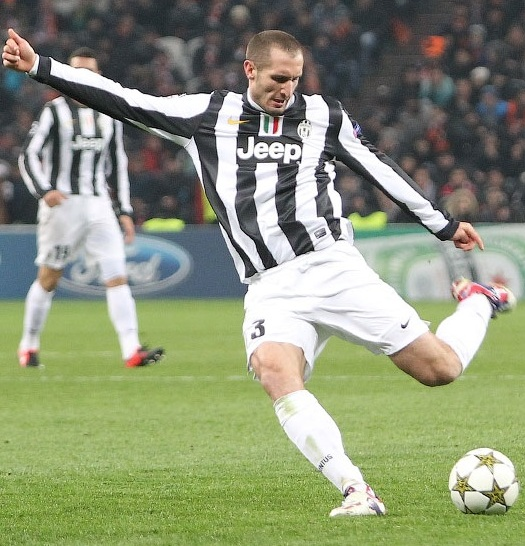
Giorgio Chiellini, who has won the award three times

Year	Player	Club	Ref(s)
2000	(Italy) Alessandro Nesta	Lazio	
2001	(Italy) Alessandro Nesta	Lazio	
2002	(Italy) Alessandro Nesta	Lazio	
2003	(Italy) Alessandro Nesta	Milan	
2004	(Italy) Paolo Maldini	Milan	
2005	(Italy) Fabio Cannavaro	Juventus	
2006	(Italy) Fabio Cannavaro	Juventus	
2007	(Italy) Marco Materazzi	Internazionale	
2008	(Italy) Giorgio Chiellini	Juventus	
2009	(Italy) Giorgio Chiellini	Juventus	
2010	(Italy) Giorgio Chiellini	Juventus	
2010	(Argentina) Walter Samuel	Internazionale	

=== By club ===
Club	Players	Total
Juventus	2	5
Milan	2	2
Lazio	1	3
Internazionale	2	2
