= Giuseppe Materazzi =

Italian football manager (born 1946)

Personal information
- Date of birth: 5 January 1946 (age 80)
- Place of birth: Arborea, Italy
- Position: Midfielder

Senior career*
Years	Team	Apps	(Gls)
1967–1968	Tempio	34	(6)
1968–1975	Lecce	228	(17)
1975–1976	Reggina	22	(1)
1976–1978	Bari	54	(2)

Managerial career
- 1979–1981: Cerretese
- 1981–1983: Bari (youth team)
- 1983–1984: Rimini
- 1984–1985: Benevento
- 1985–1987: Casertana
- 1987–1988: Pisa
- 1988–1990: Lazio
- 1990–1991: Messina
- 1991–1992: Casertana
- 1992–1996: Bari
- 1996–1997: Padova
- 1997–1998: Brescia
- 1998–1999: Piacenza
- 1999: Sporting CP
- 1999: Venezia
- 2001: Cagliari
- 2003: Tianjin Teda
- 2007: Bari
- 2008–2009: Olympiacos Volos
- 2010: Braşov
- 2016: Lazio (women)
- 2018: Bisceglie (technical director)
- * Club domestic league appearances and goals

Giuseppe Materazzi (born 5 January 1946) is an Italian football manager and former player, who played as a midfielder.

== Playing career ==
Materazzi was born in Arborea, Province of Oristano. He is best remember as one of the most representative players for U.S. Lecce, where he spent seven years and played 228 Serie C matches. He also played for Tempio, Reggina and Bari.

== Managerial career ==
Materazzi started his coaching career in 1979, for Tuscan Serie C2 team Cerretese. He first coached Serie A team, Pisa SC, in 1987–88, leading the side to a 13th-place finish. He then coached Lazio for two seasons, before to move to Serie B side Messina in 1990. His longest period as football coach started in 1992 in Bari, where he already played in his past career and coached, but at the youth level. He stayed four years in Bari, two of them in Serie A. He then coached a number of minor Serie A and Serie B teams, such as Padova, Brescia, Piacenza, before being signed by Sporting Clube de Portugal in July 1999. However his experience lasted just a few months, as Materazzi was fired in September 1999 after a UEFA Cup loss to Viking F.K. On early November he was called by Venezia chairman Maurizio Zamparini to replace Luciano Spalletti at the helm of that Serie A team, but was fired just 27 days later, and notably replaced by Spalletti. His last club experience came in January 2001, as Materazzi was appointed to coach Cagliari of Serie A.

In 2003, Materazzi signed a three-year deal with Chinese club Tianjin Teda, but left after just one year. His name was recently mentioned regarding the head coaching position for the Costa Rica national team.

On 26 February 2007, Materazzi was appointed head coach of Serie B club Bari, replacing Rolando Maran. He led his club to a quiet escape from relegation, and was confirmed for the 2007–08 season. He resigned from his post on 27 December 2007, shortly after being defeated 4–0 at home by Lecce in the Apulian derby.

On 30 December 2008, Materazzi signed a contract to become the head coach of Olympiacos Volos, after just two months, Materazzi has decided to quit Volos on 6 March 2009. The Italian trainer has decided to resign because he has not reached the targets that he had fixed.

In July 2009 he was unveiled as new general manager of Spanish Tercera División side SE Eivissa-Ibiza, where he worked alongside new head coach Onofrio Barone, former Serie A player who also served as Materazzi's assistant in a number of clubs.

In 2010, he signed with Romanian club Braşov, but resigned after just three days.

In 2016 he briefly served as head coach of women's football team S.S. Lazio Women 2015.

Materazzi returned into football in 2018 with Serie C club Bisceglie, accepting an offer as the club's new technical area director, a role he left only a few days later due to economical disagreements with the board.

== Personal life ==
Giuseppe is the father of former Inter Milan defender and Italian World Cup winner Marco Materazzi. His grandson Alessio Maestrelli made his professional debut in 2022.
