= Gian Marco Nesta =

Italian footballer

Personal information
- Date of birth: 1 March 2000 (age 26)
- Place of birth: Narni, Italy
- Height: 1.79 m (5 ft 10 in)
- Position: Right-back

Team information
- Current team: FAVL Cimini

Youth career
- –2012: Lazio
- 2012–2016: Roma
- 2016–2019: Ternana

Senior career*
Years	Team	Apps	(Gls)
2018–2022	Ternana	6	(0)
2020–2021	→ Lecco (loan)	24	(0)
2022–2023	Lecco	13	(1)
2022–2023	→ Viterbese (loan)	22	(1)
2023–	FAVL Cimini		
- * Club domestic league appearances and goals as of 14 July 2023

Gian Marco Nesta (born 1 March 2000) is an Italian footballer who plays as a right-back for an amateur side FAVL Cimini. He is the nephew of former Italian international Alessandro Nesta.

== Club career ==
Born in Narni, Umbria, Nesta was on the books of Rome-based rivals Lazio and Roma as a youth before joining Ternana of Serie C in 2016. He made his senior debut on 29 July 2018 in the first round of the Coppa Italia, starting in a 1–1 home draw (penalty shootout victory) against Pontedera; he was substituted after 78 minutes for Andrea Repossi. On 24 August 2019, he made his league debut on the first day of the new season, a 3–1 win at Rieti.

On 8 September 2020, he joined fellow Serie C club Lecco on loan.

On 21 January 2022, he returned to Lecco on a permanent basis, signing a contract until June 2023 with an option to extend. On 25 August 2022, Nesta was loaned by Viterbese.

On 17 October 2023, Nesta joined FAVL Cimini.

== Club statistics ==
=== Club ===
As of 7 July 2020.

Club	Season	League			National Cup		League Cup		Other		Total	
Club	Season	Division	Apps	Goals	Apps	Goals	Apps	Goals	Apps	Goals	Apps	Goals
Ternana	2018–19	Serie C	0	0	2 (Note: Appearance(s) in Coppa Italia)	0	0	0	0	0	2	0
Ternana	2019–20	Serie C	6	0	0	0	6 (Note: Appearance(s) in Coppa Italia Serie C)	1	1 (Note: Appearance(s) in Promotion play-offs)	0	13	1
Career total			6	0	2	0	6	1	1	0	15	1
