= Andrea Maestrelli =

Italian footballer (born 1998)

Personal information
- Date of birth: 23 February 1998 (age 28)
- Place of birth: Rome, Italy
- Height: 1.88 m (6 ft 2 in)
- Position: Defender

Youth career
- ?–2015: Tor di Quinto
- 2015–2016: Perugia
- 2016–2017: Ternana

Senior career*
Years	Team	Apps	(Gls)
2015	Perugia	0	(0)
2017–2018	Ternana	0	(0)
2017–2018	→ Arzachena (loan)	5	(0)
2018–2019	Bisceglie	26	(0)
2019–2021	Arezzo	0	(0)
2019–2020	→ Monopoli (loan)	11	(0)
2021	Lucchese	12	(0)
2021–2022	Potenza	9	(0)
- * Club domestic league appearances and goals as of 24 April 2022

Andrea Maestrelli (born 23 February 1998) is an Italian football player.

== Club career ==
He made his Serie C debut for Arzachena on 7 October 2017 in a game against Gavorrano.

On 8 July 2019, he signed with Arezzo. On 2 September 2019, he was loaned to Monopoli.

On 3 February 2021, he moved to Lucchese.
