= Alessio Maestrelli =

Italian football player (born 2003)

Personal information
- Date of birth: 28 April 2003 (age 23)
- Place of birth: Rome, Italy
- Height: 1.85 m (6 ft 1 in)
- Position: Defender

Team information
- Current team: Treviso

Youth career
- –2018: Tor di Quinto
- 2018–2023: Frosinone

Senior career*
Years	Team	Apps	(Gls)
2022–2023	Frosinone	1	(0)
2023–2024	Turris	28	(2)
2024–2026	Ternana	44	(2)
2026–	Treviso	0	(0)
- * Club domestic league appearances and goals as of 30 April 2026

Alessio Maestrelli (born 28 April 2003) is an Italian professional footballer who plays as a defender for Serie C club Treviso.

== Club career ==
He made his Serie B debut for Frosinone on 2 April 2022 in a game against Lecce.

On 15 July 2023, Maestrelli signed a two-year contract with Serie C club Turris.

On 30 August 2024, Maestrelli moved to Ternana on a three-year deal.

== Personal life ==
His grandfathers Tommaso Maestrelli and Giuseppe Materazzi both were football players and later Lazio managers, and his uncle Marco Materazzi is a World Cup and Champions League winning player.
