= Giorgio Chiellini =

Italian footballer (born 1984)

Giorgio Chiellini Ufficiale OMRI
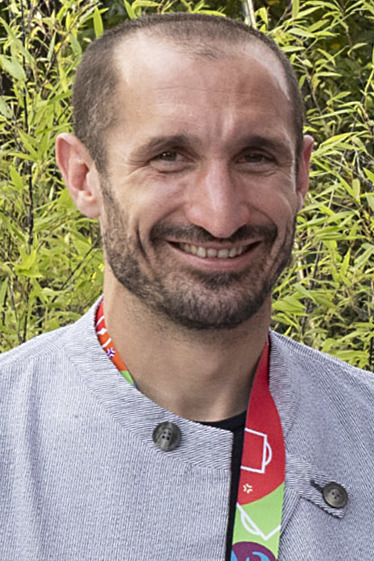
- Chiellini in 2021

Personal information
- Full name: Giorgio Chiellini
- Date of birth: 14 August 1984 (age 42)
- Place of birth: Pisa, Italy
- Height: 1.87 m (6 ft 2 in)
- Position: Centre-back

Youth career
- 1990–2000: Livorno

Senior career*
Years	Team	Apps	(Gls)
2000–2002	Livorno	8	(0)
2002–2004	Roma	0	(0)
2002–2004	→ Livorno (loan)	47	(4)
2004–2022	Juventus	425	(27)
2004–2005	→ Fiorentina (loan)	37	(3)
2022–2023	Los Angeles FC	31	(1)
Total		548	(35)

International career
2000	Italy U15	8	(0)
2000–2001	Italy U16	12	(2)
2001	Italy U17	1	(0)
2002	Italy U18	6	(1)
2001–2003	Italy U19	18	(1)
2004–2007	Italy U21	26	(6)
2004	Italy Olympic	2	(0)
2004–2022	Italy	117	(8)

Managerial career
- 2024: Juventus (Executive)
Medal record
Men's Football
Representing Italy
UEFA European Championship
Winner	2020 Europe
Runner-up	2012 Poland–Ukraine
FIFA Confederations Cup
Third place	2013 Brazil
Summer Olympics
Bronze medal – third place	2004 Athens
UEFA European Under-19 Championship
Winner	2003 Liechtenstein
CONMEBOL–UEFA Cup of Champions
Runner-up	2022 England
UEFA Nations League
Third place	2021 Italy
- * Club domestic league appearances and goals

Giorgio Chiellini Ufficiale OMRI (Italian pronunciation: [ˈdʒordʒo kjelˈliːni, ˈdʒɔr-]; born 14 August 1984) is an Italian former professional footballer who played as a centre-back or left-back. Considered one of the best defenders of all time, Chiellini was known for his strength, aggressiveness, man-marking, and ability to play in either a three or four-man defence.

At the club level, Chiellini began his career with Livorno in 2000, later playing for Fiorentina on loan as well. After moving to Juventus in 2005, he won a record nine consecutive Serie A titles with the club from 2012 to 2020, as well as five Coppa Italia and five Supercoppa Italiana trophies, having also played two UEFA Champions League finals in 2015 and 2017. Chiellini was named in the Serie A Team of the Year five times, and was elected the league's Defender of the Year on three consecutive occasions between 2008 and 2010. He departed to the United States to join Los Angeles FC in 2022, winning the Supporters' Shield and MLS Cup in his first season, before announcing his retirement the following year at the age of 39.

Having made his international debut for Italy in 2004, Chiellini was selected in the nation's squads for the 2004 Summer Olympics, winning a bronze medal. He also represented Italy in four UEFA European Championships, two FIFA World Cups and two FIFA Confederations Cups. He captained the Azzurri to the UEFA Euro 2020 title, and was also part of the sides that reached the final of Euro 2012 and achieved a third-place finish at the 2013 Confederations Cup. Chiellini retired from international football in 2022 with 117 caps, making him Italy's joint fifth-highest appearance holder.

== Early life and education ==
Chiellini was born in Pisa on 14 August 1984. He was raised in Livorno and is one of twin boys. He completed a laurea (bachelor's degree) in economics and commerce at the University of Turin in July 2010, and earned a laurea magistrale (master's degree) in business administration in April 2017 from the same institution, graduating cum laude (with honours).

== Club career ==
=== Livorno ===
Chiellini joined the youth teams at Livorno at age six and started out as a central midfielder. As he matured, he switched to playing as a winger and finally he found his position as a left back. He played in the club's youth academy between 1990 and 2000. In 2000, he took part in Torneo di Arco as a squad player for AC Milan's U-17 team during his tryout; while the youth coach Davide Ballardini rated his performance highly, the club could not satisfy Livorno's financial demands for a fifteen-year-old. In the 2000–01 Serie C1 season, Chiellini started to receive his first call-ups to the senior team and eventually made three appearances and followed that up with five more appearances the following season.

In June 2002, Chiellini was signed by Roma in a co-ownership deal, for €3.1 million (which also saw Marco Amelia move in the opposite direction, for €2.8 million); however, he was loaned back to Livorno for the 2002–03 Serie B season, after they had earned promotion. In his first Serie B season, Chiellini made six seasonal appearances, also making his Coppa Italia debut. In his second Serie B season, Chiellini broke into the starting line-up for the club and would go on to make 42 official appearances, also scoring four goals from his left-back position.

In June 2004, Livorno officially bought back Chiellini for €3 million. During his four-season spell with the club's first team, Chiellini made a total of 57 appearances, scoring four goals, before his transfer to Juventus.

=== Fiorentina ===
Chiellini was signed by Juventus in the summer of 2004 for €6.5 million from Livorno, but was immediately sold in a co-ownership deal to Fiorentina for €3.5 million, and played on the Florentine team during the 2004–05 Serie A season. The complex deal actually meant Juventus bought Roma's half for €3 million and Fiorentina bought Livorno's half for €3.5 million. In his loan season with the club, Chiellini was a regular in the club's starting XI, making 42 official appearances, also scoring three goals.

=== Juventus ===
==== 2005–2011: Early years, Calciopoli and struggles ====
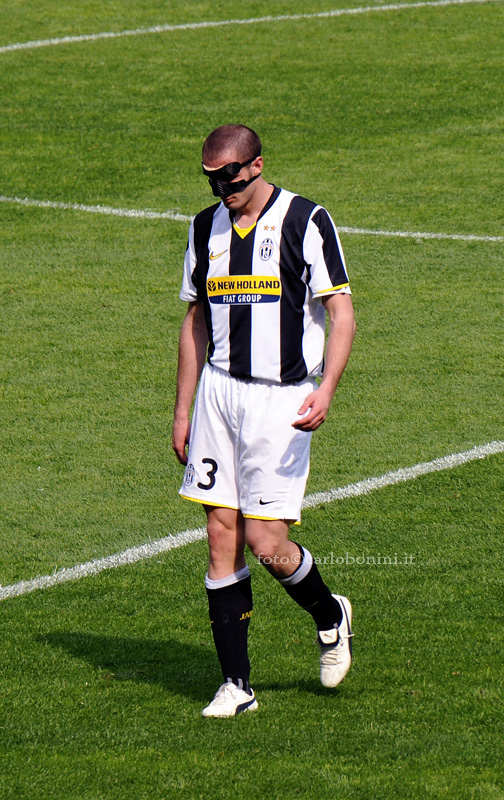
Chiellini with Juventus in 2009

After an excellent first season in Serie A, Chiellini was recalled for the 2005–06 season, and Juventus paid €4.3 million for the rest of his contract. He became a regular under Fabio Capello and made 23 appearances in his first season with the club, also helping the Old Lady to their 29th scudetto (which was later assigned to Inter following the 2006 "Calciopoli" scandal).

While in the Serie B, he started playing at centre back, partnering Nicola Legrottaglie, Jean-Alain Boumsong and Robert Kovač at various stages of the season. Juventus won the 2006–07 Serie B title, gaining Serie A promotion with the best goal difference, conceding only 30 goals and scoring over 80 in 42 matches. He scored a double in a 5–1 thrashing at Arezzo in May, a result that mathematically sealed promotion for Juventus.

With Juventus back in Serie A for the 2007–08 season, Chiellini again was a starter for the club at left back, but following injuries to Jorge Andrade and Domenico Criscito, he was shifted to centre back again. Chiellini had a tremendous season and eventually made the position his own. Alongside fellow centre-half Nicola Legrottaglie, the duo were instrumental as Juventus finished the season with the joint second-best defensive record. The surprising aspect of this is that neither was considered remotely close to pinning down a centre-back position in the summer before the season, with Domenico Criscito and Jorge Andrade preferred as the starting duo. He has been a regular fixture in the Juventus backline since their return to Serie A and was notably named Man of the Match in a game against Juventus rivals, Internazionale when he won a physical and heated duel with former teammate Zlatan Ibrahimović, keeping the Swedish striker at bay. Chiellini extended his original contract from 2009 to 2011 on 12 October 2006. On 27 April 2008, Chiellini scored twice for Juventus in 5–2 win over Lazio that confirmed Juventus's place in the Serie A top four. on 26 June 2008, Chiellini extended his contract with Juventus until 2013.

During the 2008–09 season, Chiellini remained as the first choice in central defence alongside Nicola Legrottaglie. Chiellini scored his first goal in Europe on 13 August 2008 as Juve beat Artmedia Petržalka 4–0 in the first leg of the UEFA Champions League third qualifying round tie. Four days later, he injured his left knee again during the Trofeo Luigi Berlusconi against AC Milan and missed the start of the Serie A season, returning to duty in September starting in each of Juve's first three Champions League group games. At the end of the year, he was named Serie A Defender of the Year for 2008 at the annual Oscar del Calcio awards ceremony. On 10 March 2009, Chiellini was sent off for a second bookable offense during the Champions League first knockout round second leg tie at home in a tightly contested match against Chelsea, but Juventus were eliminated 3–2 on aggregate after holding the former English champions to a 2–2 draw.

An injury sustained in the win over Fiorentina on 6 March 2010 sidelined him for several important games and, in his absence, Juventus embarked on a miserable run of form, conceding nine goals in the four games he missed. He marked his return by scoring the opening goal away at Napoli but was unable to prevent Juventus from succumbing to a 3–1 defeat. On 23 November 2010, Chiellini extended his contract with Juventus again until 30 June 2015 and was given a pay raise.

During the beginning of the 2010–11 season, Chiellini was mostly partnered with newly signed youngster Leonardo Bonucci. With the arrival of fellow Italy international Andrea Barzagli in the winter transfer window, Chiellini occasionally played at left back to accommodate the Bonucci–Barzagli partnership and sometimes partnered Barzagli.

==== 2011–2014: First Scudetto and domestic dominance ====
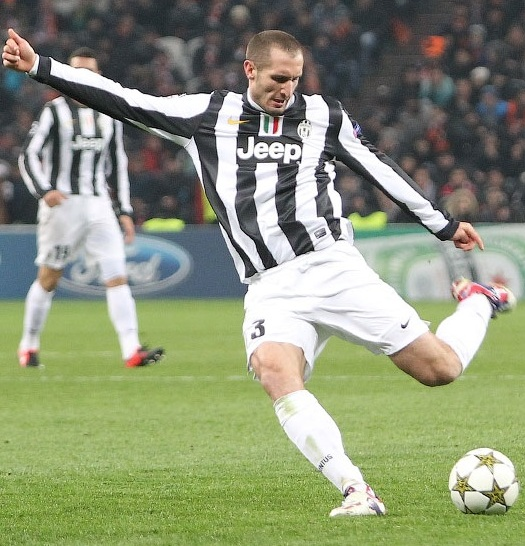
Chiellini playing for the Bianconeri in 2012

Under manager Antonio Conte, Chiellini returned to his original position at left back due to Barzagli and Bonucci's good run of form. After struggling to re-adapt back to his former position, he grew into his role and managed to keep Paolo De Ceglie, the only other natural left back in the squad, on the bench for much of the first half of the 2011–12 season. In the second half of the 2011–12 season, Conte switched to a three-man defence, where Chiellini partnered Bonucci and Barzagli in a very successful defensive system for Juve, who ended the season as Serie A champions, with the best defensive record, as well as being unbeaten in the league. Due to their performances together, the three-man defence earned the nickname BBC, a reference to the players' initials, and soon the trio established themselves as one of the best defences in world football during the following seasons. Juventus lost the 2012 Coppa Italia Final against Napoli, but would later defeat them in the 2012 Supercoppa Italiana, although Chiellini would miss the match.

Chiellini made his 250th appearance with Juventus on 22 September 2012, on his first appearance of the 2012–13 season after coming back from injury, in a 2–0 home win over Chievo. On 1 March 2013, after coming back from another injury suffered in mid-December, he scored a header in a 1–1 draw over Napoli at the San Paolo stadium, which allowed Juventus to keep their 6-point lead over Napoli, who were in second place. Juventus retained the Serie A title and the Supercoppa Italiana that season, once again finishing the year with the best defensive record in Italy. Chiellini was the only Italian player to be nominated for the 2013 UEFA Team of the Year.

On 6 October 2013, Chiellini scored in Juventus's 3–2 win over Milan, scoring the match-winning goal; the next day, he announced the renewal of his contract with Juventus, which would keep him at the club until 2017. He made his 300th appearance with Juventus in a 3–0 Serie A victory against Roma on 5 January 2014, as he went on to win his third consecutive league title with Juventus that season.

==== 2014–2018: Continued domestic success and two Champions League finals ====
In the 2014 Supercoppa Italiana on 22 December 2014, Juventus were defeated by Napoli on penalties after a 2–2 draw following extra-time; Chiellini missed one of Juventus's spot-kicks in the resulting shoot-out. On 20 May, Chiellini captained Juventus in the club's 2–1 win over Lazio in the 2015 Coppa Italia Final, also scoring Juventus's first goal of the night.

On 4 June 2015, it was confirmed that Chiellini would not participate in the 2015 UEFA Champions League Final against Barcelona as a scan on his left leg revealed he had a first-degree calf muscle tear. In the absence of Chiellini, Juventus were defeated 3–1 by Barcelona at Berlin's Olympiastadion.

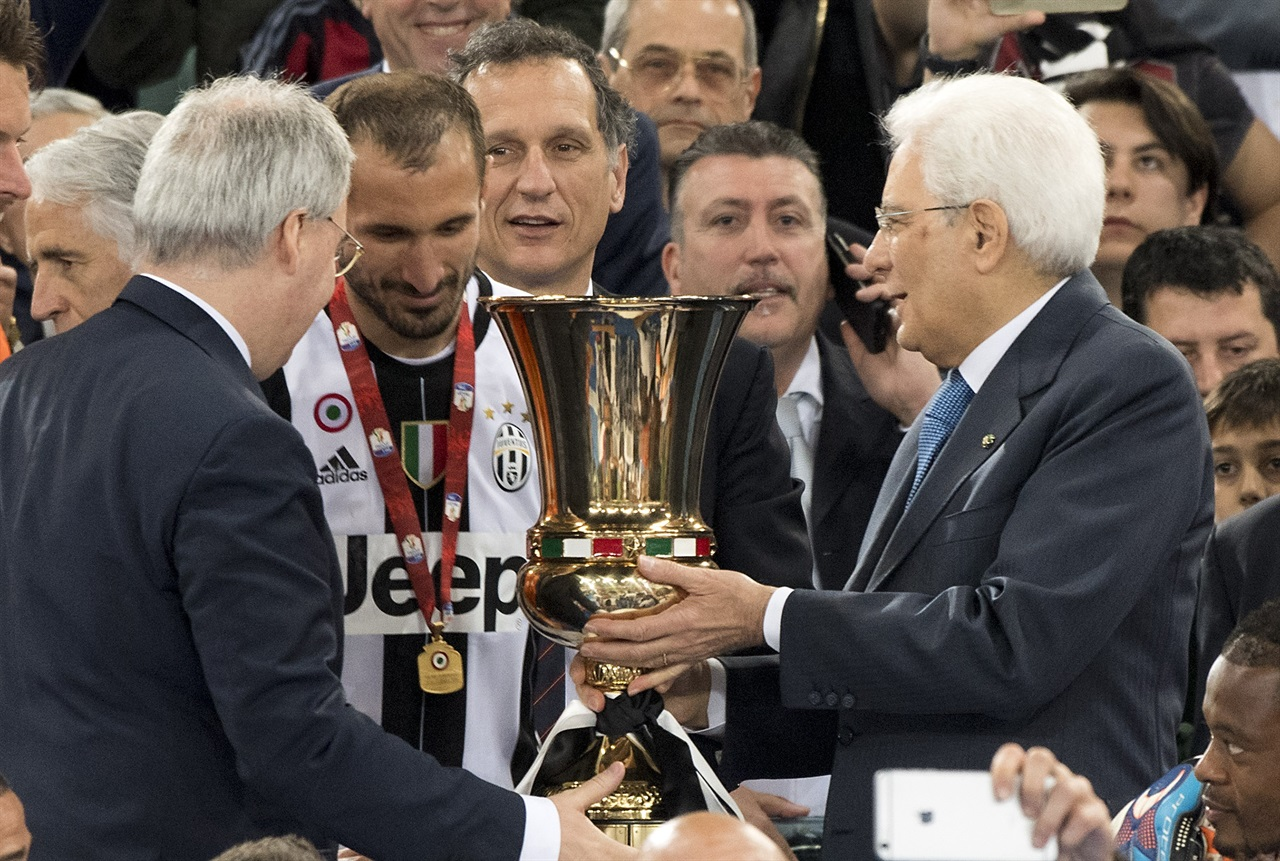
Chiellini (centre), Juventus' captain during the 2016 Coppa Italia Final, receives the trophy by the President of the Italian Republic, Sergio Mattarella (right).

Chiellini was ruled out of the 2015 Supercoppa Italiana after sustaining an injury in a 2–1 away friendly victory over Lechia Gdańsk on 29 July, which kept him sidelined for three weeks. On 24 November, Chiellini was nominated for the 2015 UEFA Team of the Year.

On 9 February 2016, it was confirmed that Chiellini would miss the Serie A match on 13 February against Napoli, as well as the first round of 16 leg of the Champions League on 23 February against Bayern Munich due to an injury. Chiellini returned to action on 28 February to take on rivals Internazionale, yet again sustaining an injury to his thigh which caused him to limp off the pitch and substituted off in the 35th minute. After already having missed the first round of 16 leg against Bayern, there was further doubt as to if he would miss the second leg as well on 16 March. However, after medical testing it was estimated he would only be out for ten days, initially thought to only miss the second leg of the Coppa Italia semi-finals against Internazionale on 2 March and a Serie A match against Atalanta on 6 March; he wouldn't be fit for the second round of 16 leg of the Champions League, and missed the match. He returned from injury on 2 April, starting in a 1–0 home win over Empoli, but sustained yet another injury to his adductor longus muscle in his right thigh before being substituted off in the 54th minute of that match; further tests in the following days revealed he would be out for 20 days. He returned to action once again in a 2–1 away defeat to Verona, on 8 May. After constant injury spells throughout the season, Chiellini scored in the last match of the season on 14 May in the 77th minute of a 5–0 home win over Sampdoria, as Juventus celebrated winning the league title for a fifth consecutive time since the 2011–12 season; this was Chiellini's 400th appearance for Juventus. On 21 May, Chiellini captained Juventus in the 2016 Coppa Italia Final in Rome; he played a key role in a 1–0 extra-time victory over Milan (the club's eleventh Coppa Italia title in total), helping his team to defend the title and keep a clean sheet. He later lifted the trophy as Juventus became the first Italian club ever to win consecutive domestic doubles.

"It's actually better to have Chiellini."

— In an interview with Tuttosport, Federico Bernardeschi underlined that despite the arrival of Cristiano Ronaldo, everyone wanted Chiellini on their team in training games.

On 26 October 2016, Chiellini scored two goals in a 4–1 home win over Sampdoria after three weeks out due to injury. On 23 December, Chiellini scored the opening goal in the Supercoppa Italiana against Milan, but it ended in defeat as Milan won 4–3 in penalty shoot-out following a 1–1 draw after extra time.

On 28 April, he made his 300th appearance in Serie A with Juventus in a 2–2 away draw against Atalanta. On 3 June, after Chiellini missed out on the 2015 Champions League Final, he started in the 2017 final, Juventus' second final appearance in three years, but were defeated 4–1 by defending champions Real Madrid.

On 12 September 2017, Chiellini missed the opening 2017–18 Champions League group stage match of the season against Barcelona, due to a calf injury.

On 11 January 2018, Chiellini was named to the 2017 UEFA Team of the Year. He made his 350th appearance in Serie A in a 0–0 away draw against S.P.A.L., on 17 March.

==== 2018–2022: Juventus captain and ninth consecutive Serie A title ====
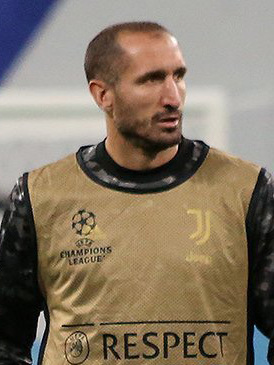
Chiellini with Juventus in 2021

On 29 June 2018, Chiellini was given a two-year contract extension until 2020 and also named the club's new captain after the departure of Buffon.

On 16 January 2019, Chiellini lifted his first title as Juventus's new official captain – the Supercoppa Italiana – following a 1–0 victory over Milan. On 12 March, Chiellini marked his 500th appearance in a Juventus jersey with a 3–0 win home to Atlético Madrid in the Champions League round of 16 second leg to overturn a 2–0 deficit to reach the quarter-finals. Juventus ended the season as league champions, with Chiellini capturing his record eighth Serie A title with the club.

On 24 August, in Juventus's opening match of the 2019–20 season against Parma, Chiellini scored the only goal of the match in a 1–0 away win in Serie A. On 30 August, Chiellini tore his anterior cruciate ligament during training. He returned on 16 February 2020, in a match against Brescia, replacing Leonardo Bonucci in the 78th minute. On 29 June, Chiellini signed a new contract with Juventus, extending until June 2021.

On 20 October 2020, Chiellini made his 71st Champions League appearance with Juventus in the team's opening European game of the season, a 2–0 away win over Dynamo Kyiv, overtaking Alessio Tacchinardi as the club's third–most capped player of all time in the competition; however, he suffered an injury during the first half and was replaced by Merih Demiral.

On 2 August 2021, Chiellini renewed his contract with Juventus, signing a two-year contract extension until June 2023. However, after losing the 2022 Coppa Italia Final, Chiellini announced that he would leave Juventus at the end of the 2021–22 season. He started in his final game for Juventus, a 2–0 loss to Fiorentina.

=== Los Angeles FC ===
On 13 June 2022, Chiellini agreed to join Major League Soccer club Los Angeles FC on a contract through 2023 using Targeted Allocation Money. On 17 July 2022, Chiellini made his debut during a 2–1 win against Nashville SC and was substituted at the 60th minute. On November 5, Chiellini lifted the MLS Cup following LAFC's penalty shoot-out win over Philadelphia Union. On 4 March 2023, Chiellini scored his first Major League Soccer goal during the 3–2 win over the Portland Timbers. As a result, he was named to the league's Team of the Matchday.

On 12 December 2023, three days after LAFC were defeated in the MLS Cup final by Columbus Crew, Chiellini announced his retirement from professional football at the age of 39.

== International career ==
=== Youth level ===
Chiellini represented Italy at all youth levels, and he won the European Under-19 Championship with Italy in 2003, and was also a member of the Italy team that won the bronze medal at the football tournament of the 2004 Summer Olympics. He participated in the 2006 and 2007 U-21 Championships as Italy's captain, scoring 2 goals over both tournaments, although Italy were eliminated in the group stage on both occasions. He was named in the 'UEFA Team of the tournament' of the 2007 U-21 Championships held in the Netherlands, where Italy also obtained qualification for the 2008 Summer Olympics. In total, he made 26 appearances for the Under-21 side, scoring 6 goals.

=== 2004–2008: Early senior career and Euro 2008 ===
Chiellini made his debut for the Italy national team on 17 November 2004 against Finland under Marcello Lippi, at the age of 20. Chiellini was not a part of the Italian squad that won the 2006 World Cup, partially because he had transferred to Juventus in 2005 and was still working his way into consistent playing time with one of the giants of Serie A. He became a regular squad member in 2007, and he scored his first goal for Italy on 21 November 2007, against the Faroe Islands, in Modena, in a UEFA Euro 2008 qualifying match.

Chiellini was called up to Italy's squad for UEFA Euro 2008 under manager Roberto Donadoni, and injured captain Fabio Cannavaro in a collision during a training session, which resulted in Cannavaro missing out on the tournament. He was sidelined in the opening game against the Netherlands, which Italy went on to lose 3–0. He subsequently received the nod to partner Christian Panucci at centre-back from the second game onwards, cementing his place in the Azzurri defence; in the second group match of the tournament, he assisted Panucci's equaliser in a 1–1 draw against Romania. While he also featured in the final group game, keeping a clean-sheet in a 2–0 win against France, his most impressive display was arguably against Spain in the quarter-finals, where he famously neutralised the threat of the Spanish attacking duo of David Villa and Fernando Torres. The game ended 0–0, with Italy eventually losing 4–2 on penalties.

=== 2008–2014: Euro 2012 runners-up ===
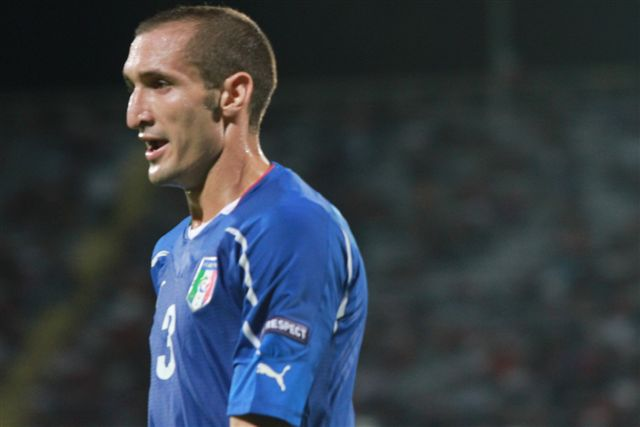
Chiellini in the Italy national team in 2011

During 2010 World Cup qualifying, Chiellini cemented his place as an undisputed first-choice in Marcello Lippi's squad. He played the full 90 minutes in all three group matches at the 2009 FIFA Confederations Cup but Italy were eliminated at the group stages on goal difference. He was also the starting Italy centre back, along with Cannavaro, in the 2010 World Cup, although Italy disappointed and exited in the first round, finishing in last place in their group with two points, and failing to win a match having trailed in all three group games without leading at any point.

Under Cesare Prandelli, Chiellini was once again the starting centre back during Italy's UEFA Euro 2012 qualifying campaign. Along with Juventus teammates Andrea Barzagli and Leonardo Bonucci, and also Daniele De Rossi, he started in defence for Italy in the UEFA Euro 2012 tournament, after recovering from an injury he had encountered during the final Serie A game of the season. He suffered another injury in Italy's final group match against Ireland, which ended in a 2–0 win, ruling him out of the quarter-final fixture against England; he returned to the starting line-up for Italy's 2–1 semi-final victory over Germany. Italy reached the final, but were defeated once again by Spain, suffering a 4–0 loss. Despite suffering a minor injury in the semi-final, Chiellini started as left back in the final, but was substituted after sustaining yet another injury; Spain's first goal of the match arose from his mistake, due to his precarious physical condition.

On 14 November 2012, in a 2–1 friendly defeat to France, Chiellini wore the captain's armband with Italy for the first time in his career.

On 22 June 2013, Chiellini scored his third goal for Italy against Brazil in the 2013 Confederations Cup in a 2–4 defeat, a low shot to the net after the referee Ravshan Irmatov had initially signalled for a penalty kick to Italy. Italy managed to finish the tournament in third place, following a 3–2 penalty shootout win over Uruguay in the bronze medal match.

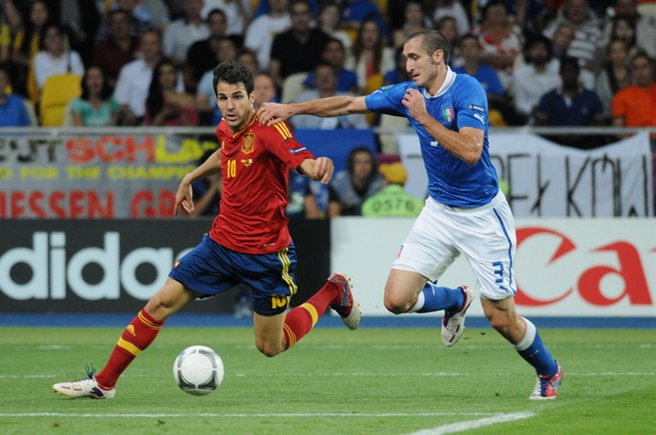
Chiellini (right) challenges Cesc Fàbregas of Spain during the UEFA Euro 2012 Final.

In the 2014 FIFA World Cup Qualifying fixture against the Czech Republic, at the Juventus Stadium in Turin, on 10 September 2013, Chiellini scored Italy's first goal in a 2–1 home win, which allowed the nation to clinch the top spot in their group and qualify for the 2014 FIFA World Cup in Brazil with two games at hand; this was the first time that the Italian squad had done so.

During the 2014 World Cup, in Italy's final group stage game against Uruguay, Chiellini, while defending Luis Suárez in the penalty area, was bitten in the left shoulder by Suárez from behind. It was Suárez's third career biting incident. As the Italian players protested to the Mexican referee Marco Antonio Rodríguez for not penalizing Suárez, Uruguay won a corner and scored, winning 1–0 to qualify for the last 16 and eliminating Italy. As a result, the FIFA Disciplinary Committee launched an investigation into the incident. On 26 June, the committee announced that Suárez would be suspended for nine matches and banned from any football activity (including entering any stadium) for four months. Suárez was also fined CHF100,000 (approx. £65,700/€82,000/US$119,000). Even so, Chiellini expressed his view that the four-month ban on Suárez for all football-related activities including was "excessive". "There only remains the anger and the disappointment about the match. At the moment, my only thought is for Luis and his family, because they will face a very difficult period." Chiellini said after the game, noting that he hoped Suárez would be allowed to remain with his teammates during World Cup games, "because such a ban is really alienating for a player." Chiellini wrote in his autobiography that he could sympathsize with Suárez's competitive determination.

[Luis] Suárez and I are similar and I like facing strikers like him. I called him a couple of days after the game, but he had no need to apologize to me. I too am a son of a b*tch on the field and proud of it.

=== 2014–2016: Euro 2016 campaign ===
On 10 October 2014, in a UEFA Euro 2016 qualifying match against Azerbaijan in Palermo, Chiellini put Italy ahead with a first-half header. He then scored a late own goal, but headed a winner three minutes from time to give Italy a 2–1 victory. Italy qualified for Euro 2016 on 10 October of the following year after a 3–1 win over Azerbaijan. On 17 November 2015, Chiellini made his 82nd appearance for Italy in a 2–2 friendly home draw against Romania, overtaking Franco Baresi, Giuseppe Bergomi, and Marco Tardelli as Italy's tenth most capped player of all time. On 31 May 2016, Chiellini was named to Conte's 23-man Italy squad for Euro 2016. Playing alongside Bonucci and Barzagli, Chiellini drew praise for his defensive performances, as he helped Italy keep clean-sheets in both of their opening two victories over Belgium and Sweden, which enabled the nation to top their group and advance to the second round. Having been booked for a tactical foul in Italy's opening match on 13 June, Chiellini was rested for Italy's final group match against Ireland on 22 June, which ended in a 1–0 defeat. In the round of 16 at Stade de France in Paris on 27 June, he scored the opening goal in a 2–0 win over reigning European champions Spain and helped Italy record their third clean-sheet of the tournament. Italy were eliminated from the competition in a 6–5 penalty shoot-out defeat to reigning World Cup champions Germany in the quarter-finals, on 2 July.

=== 2016–2017: 2018 World Cup qualifying campaign ===
In Italy's opening 2018 FIFA World Cup qualification match against Israel on 5 September 2016, Chiellini earned his 90th international cap, but was later given his first ever national team red card after a second bookable offense in the 55th minute of an eventual 3–1 away win; causing him to miss the next group match against Spain on 6 October, an eventual 1–1 draw.

Chiellini also missed the return match against Spain on 2 September 2017, an eventual 3–0 away loss, as well as the return match against Israel on 5 September, an eventual 1–0 home win, with a calf injury. On 9 October, Chiellini made his 94th appearance for Italy in a 1–0 away victory over Albania in a World Cup qualifier, equalling Giacinto Facchetti as the nation's joint-eighth highest appearance holder of all time. Italy finished in Group G in second place behind Spain, and advanced to the play-off against Sweden. Italy failed to qualify for the 2018 FIFA World Cup after a 1–0 aggregate loss to Sweden. The second leg, a 0–0 home draw on 13 November, was initially thought to be his final international appearance, as Chiellini announced his retirement from the national team immediately after the match.

=== 2018–2022: Captaincy and Euro 2020 triumph ===
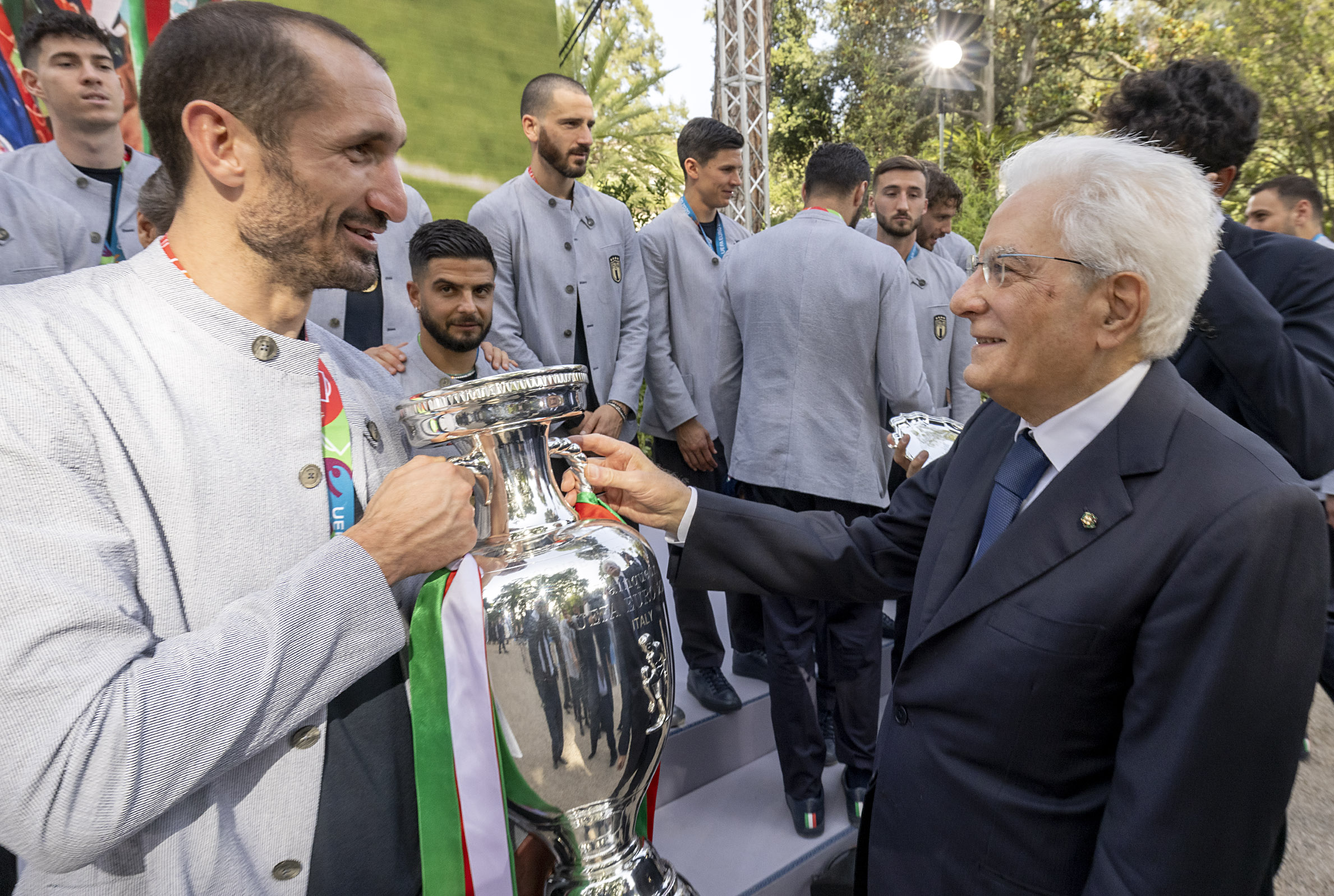
President of Italy Sergio Mattarella (right) congratulates Chiellini (carrying the trophy) in Rome, the day after Italy's UEFA Euro 2020 triumph.

On 17 March 2018, despite Chiellini's initial decision to retire, he was called up for the March 2018 friendlies against Argentina and England by interim manager Luigi Di Biagio. After sustaining an injury, however, he was dropped from the squad, and Angelo Ogbonna was called up in his place.

He was once again called up to the national team in September 2018, by manager Roberto Mancini, for Italy's opening UEFA Nations League matches against Poland and Portugal later that month. Chiellini was also named the new captain of the Italy national team following Gianluigi Buffon's international retirement. He subsequently wore the captain's armband in Italy's 1–1 home draw against Poland on 7 September, in their UEFA Nations League opener. On 11 October, he made his 98th appearance for Italy in a 1–1 friendly draw against Ukraine in Genoa, equalling Gianluca Zambrotta as his nation's joint-seventh highest appearance holder of all time. On 17 November, he made his 100th appearance for Italy in a 0–0 draw against Portugal at the San Siro stadium in Milan, in his team's final UEFA Nations League match.

In June 2021, Chiellini was included in Italy's squad for UEFA Euro 2020. In the opening match on 11 June, a 3–0 win over Turkey, he became the oldest player to appear for Italy at the European Championships, at the age of 36 years, 301 days. In their second group match against Switzerland in Rome on 16 June, he had a goal disallowed for an apparent handball and was later forced off in the first half due to injury, being replaced by Francesco Acerbi; Italy won the match 3–0, allowing them to advance to the round of 16 of the tournament. Chiellini would however recover from his injury, starting in Italy's 2–1 victory over Belgium in the quarter-finals on 2 July. He subsequently went on to captain Italy to its second ever European Championship victory on 11 July, following a 3–2 penalty shoot-out victory over England in the final at Wembley Stadium after a 1–1 draw in extra time.

On 25 April 2022, Chiellini announced that he would retire from international football after the 2022 Finalissima against reigning Copa América champions Argentina on 1 June. During the match, he made his final and 117th international appearance, equalling Daniele De Rossi as the team's fourth–most capped player of all time; Italy were defeated 3–0 at Wembley Stadium, with Chiellini coming off at half time.

== Style of play ==
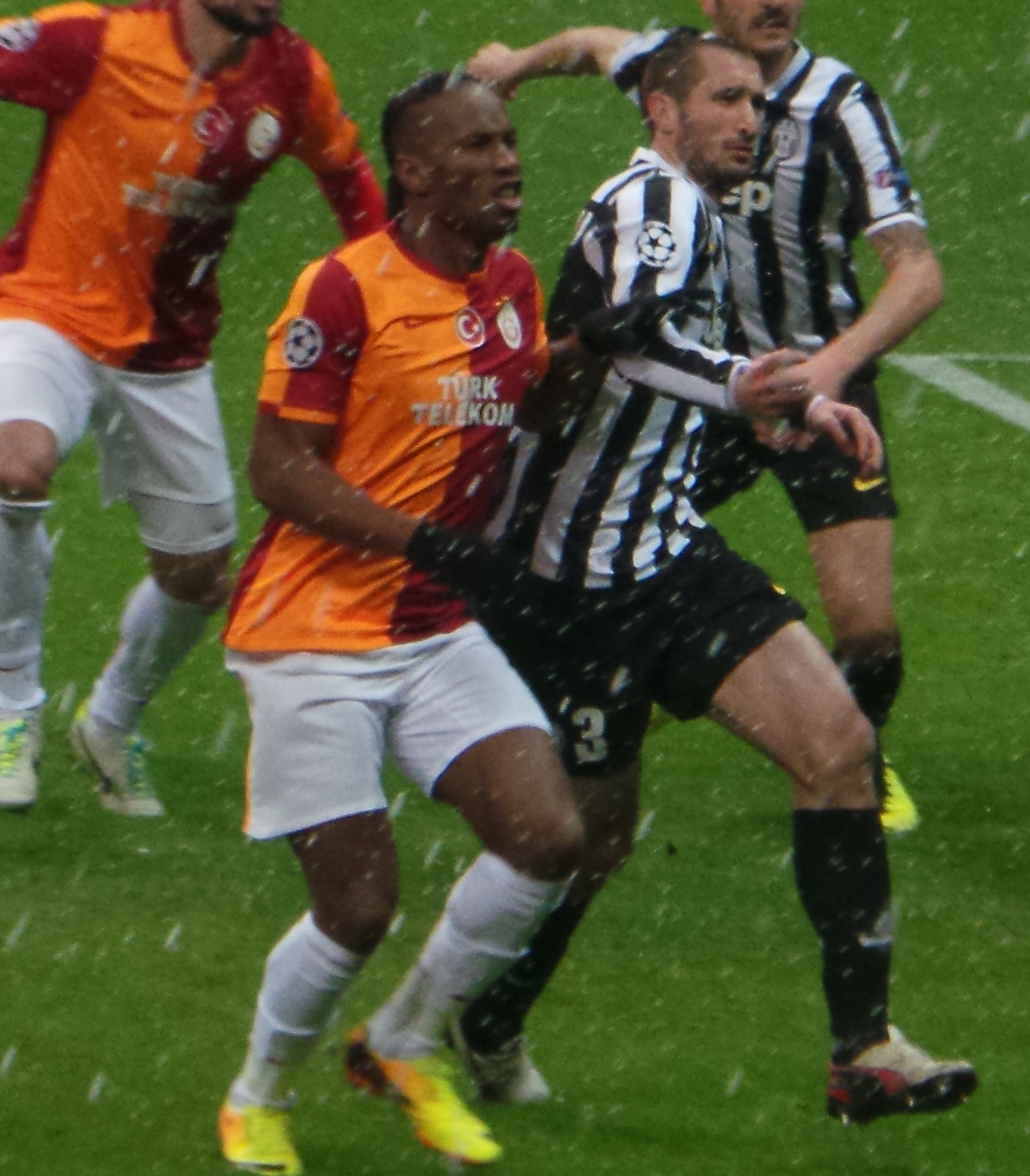
Chiellini (right) defending Didier Drogba in 2013

Chiellini began his professional career as a defensive-minded left-back, but later made his name as a centre-back, with a penchant for scoring headers from set-pieces, due to his height and strength. A left-footed defender, with awareness, positional sense, and an ability to read the game, he was capable of playing both in a three to four-man defence. He was also known for his ability to cover ground and put pressure on or anticipate opponents in positions higher up on the pitch.

Regarded as a promising defender in his youth, Chiellini came to be considered one of the best defenders in world football, one of the greatest defenders of his generation, and one of Juventus's and Italy's greatest defenders ever. In 2018, his Juventus manager at the time – Massimiliano Allegri – described him as "the best defender in the world." Regarding Chiellini's strength and man-marking ability, his former Livorno manager Walter Mazzarri once labeled him as "a force of nature", also adding "he's a universal player that any coach would love to have on his team. He is from another planet; he can mark three players by himself."

Due to his tenacious, no-nonsense playing style, Chiellini has been described as an "old-fashioned" man-marking centre-back, or stopper, who primarily served as a ball-winner; as such, he was often partnered with a ball-playing centre-back, such as Bonucci, throughout his career. Chiellini's physicality and aggression as a defender, as well as his trademark goal celebration, which involved him beating his chest, earned him the nickname "King Kong". Although he was not known for his pace over short distances, he was also a mobile defender. While Chiellini was not particularly skilful or elegant from a technical standpoint, he possessed good vision and reliable distribution, which allowed him to play the ball out or launch attacks from the back after winning back possession. Over the course of his career, Chiellini worked on improving the mental aspect of his game and also refined his technique, both on the ball and when tackling, which allowed him to adapt effectively to the physical effects of ageing, and to tactical changes in his teams' playing style, which favoured passing and cleaner challenges over more physical defending. His change in style saw him make fewer tackles and more passes per game, and also allowed him to commit fewer fouls. He described his new style as being "more reflective, less impulsive."

A popular figure with fans, Chiellini was also known for his dedication and vocal leadership on the pitch, and was Juventus's long-time vice captain, behind Gianluigi Buffon; following Buffon's departure in 2018, Chiellini was appointed the team's new captain. Throughout his career with Italy and Juventus, the defensive trio of Barzagli, Bonucci, and Chiellini, which was dubbed the BBC in the media, was considered to be one of the greatest in history, with pundits likening it to Italy's and Juventus's successful defensive trio of the 1930s, made up of full-backs Virginio Rosetta and Umberto Caligaris, as well as centre-half Luis Monti, who also won five consecutive league titles. With Andrea Barzagli's retirement, the subsequent Bonucci–Chiellini axis was considered, in terms of longevity and performance at high levels, one of the most solid and complementary in international football, as well as being compared to duets from the past such as Beckenbauer–Schwarzenbeck, Scirea–Gentile or Baresi–Costacurta. Chiellini also proved to be a popular captain with the Italy national team, stating that a captain's role was to ease the tension for the rest of the team during important moments. Moreover, he possessed a strong mentality, good temperament under pressure, determination, and excellent concentration, as well as an ability to organise his back-line. Despite his ability as a defender however, Cheillini often struggled with injuries in later seasons. In 2021, Polish striker Robert Lewandowski named Chiellini and Sergio Ramos as the toughest defenders he has ever faced.

== Post-playing career ==
Shortly after his retirement, in January 2024, Chiellini was appointed by his former team Los Angeles FC as a Player Development Coach in the staff of manager Steve Cherundolo. He later departed from this role on 16 July 2024.

In May of that year, Chiellini joined the Fox Sports broadcast team as a studio analyst for UEFA Euro 2024.

In September 2024, Chiellini announced that he is now an investor with Mercury/13, a women's multi-club network that owns FC Como Women in Serie A. His time playing in Los Angeles, which coincided with Angel City FC's debut season, inspired him to invest in the women's game. In a statement, Chiellini said:

"After spending time in the U.S., I saw the incredible strides women's football is making there and how much potential it still has to unlock in Europe. That experience inspired me, and I'm proud to be part of a project that's all about creating new opportunities for female athletes and taking the sport to the next level internationally."

In October 2025, he became the director of football strategy for Juventus.

== Outside of football ==
In March 2022, Chiellini wrote an article entitled "We must no longer pretend that racism doesn’t exist in our society" for FIFPRO's series that highlights the personal impact of racism and discrimination in the game from the players’ perspectives.

== Personal life ==
In July 2014, Chiellini married his long-time girlfriend Carolina Bonistalli at a private Catholic ceremony at the Sanctuary of Montenero in Livorno. The couple have two daughters. That same year, he published a book, C'è un angelo bianconero. Il mio maestro si chiama Scirea.

Chiellini features in EA Sports' FIFA video game series; he was on the covers of the Italian editions of FIFA 10, alongside global cover star Ronaldinho, and FIFA 11, alongside global cover star Kaká.

Throughout the 2017–18 season, Chiellini appeared in the Netflix docu-series First Team: Juventus.

In 2020, Chiellini released his autobiography Io, Giorgio, with the profits going to the insuperabili charity during the COVID-19 pandemic in Italy. However, Chiellini attracted controversy due to his strong criticism of his former club and international teammates Felipe Melo and Mario Balotelli in his book.

== Career statistics ==
=== Club ===
Appearances and goals by club, season and competition
Club	Season	League			Coppa Italia		Continental		Other		Total	
Club	Season	Division	Apps	Goals	Apps	Goals	Apps	Goals	Apps	Goals	Apps	Goals
Livorno	2000–01	Serie C1	3	0	1	0	—		—		4	0
Livorno	2001–02	Serie C1	5	0	8	0	—		2	0	15	0
Livorno	Total		8	0	9	0	0	0	2	0	19	0
Livorno (loan)	2002–03	Serie B	6	0	1	0	—		—		7	0
Livorno (loan)	2003–04	Serie B	41	4	1	0	—		—		42	4
Livorno (loan)	Total		47	4	2	0	0	0	0	0	49	4
Fiorentina (loan)	2004–05	Serie A	37	3	5	0	—		—		42	3
Juventus	2005–06	Serie A	17	0	0	0	6 (Note: Appearances in UEFA Champions League)	0	0	0	23	0
Juventus	2006–07	Serie B	32	3	3	1	—		—		35	4
Juventus	2007–08	Serie A	30	3	2	0	—		—		32	3
Juventus	2008–09	Serie A	27	4	1	0	8	1	—		36	5
Juventus	2009–10	Serie A	32	4	2	0	6 (Note: Four appearances and one goal in UEFA Champions League, two appearances in UEFA Europa League)	1	—		40	5
Juventus	2010–11	Serie A	32	2	2	0	9 (Note: Appearances in UEFA Europa League)	2	—		43	4
Juventus	2011–12	Serie A	34	2	3	0	—		—		37	2
Juventus	2012–13	Serie A	24	1	0	0	8	0	0	0	32	1
Juventus	2013–14	Serie A	31	3	1	0	11 (Note: Five appearances in UEFA Champions League, six appearances in UEFA Europa League)	0	1 (Note: Appearance in Supercoppa Italiana)	1	44	4
Juventus	2014–15	Serie A	28	0	4	1	12	0	1	0	45	1
Juventus	2015–16	Serie A	24	1	4	0	6	0	0	0	34	1
Juventus	2016–17	Serie A	21	2	2	0	9	1	1	1	33	4
Juventus	2017–18	Serie A	26	0	4	0	7	0	1	0	38	0
Juventus	2018–19	Serie A	25	1	2	0	6	0	1	0	34	1
Juventus	2019–20	Serie A	4	1	0	0	0	0	0	0	4	1
Juventus	2020–21	Serie A	17	0	4	0	3	0	1	0	25	0
Juventus	2021–22	Serie A	21	0	3	0	1	0	1	0	26	0
Juventus	Total		425	27	37	2	92	5	7	2	561	36
Los Angeles FC	2022	Major League Soccer	11	0	—		—		2 (Note: Appearances in MLS Cup playoffs)	0	13	0
Los Angeles FC	2023	Major League Soccer	20	1	—		3 (Note: Appearances in CONCACAF Champions League)	0	9 (Note: Three appearances in Leagues Cup, one appearance in Campeones Cup, five appearances in MLS Cup playoffs)	0	32	1
Los Angeles FC	Total		31	1	0	0	3	0	11	0	45	1
Career total			548	35	53	2	95	5	20	2	716	44

=== International ===
Appearances and goals by national team and year
National team	Year	Apps	Goals
Italy	2004	1	0
Italy	2005	4	0
Italy	2006	1	0
Italy	2007	3	1
Italy	2008	7	0
Italy	2009	11	1
Italy	2010	10	0
Italy	2011	12	0
Italy	2012	8	0
Italy	2013	10	2
Italy	2014	7	2
Italy	2015	8	0
Italy	2016	8	1
Italy	2017	6	1
Italy	2018	4	0
Italy	2019	3	0
Italy	2020	2	0
Italy	2021	9	0
Italy	2022	3	0
Total		117	8

Italy score listed first, score column indicates score after each Chiellini goal.

List of international goals scored by Giorgio Chiellini
No.	Date	Venue	Opponent	Score	Result	Competition
1	21 November 2007	Stadio Alberto Braglia, Modena, Italy	Faroe Islands	3–0	3–1	UEFA Euro 2008 qualification
2	18 November 2009	Stadio Dino Manuzzi, Cesena, Italy	Sweden	1–0	1–0	Friendly
3	22 June 2013	Itaipava Arena Fonte Nova, Salvador, Brazil	Brazil	2–3	2–4	2013 FIFA Confederations Cup
4	10 September 2013	Juventus Stadium, Turin, Italy	Czech Republic	1–1	2–1	2014 FIFA World Cup qualification
5	10 October 2014	Stadio Renzo Barbera, Palermo, Italy	Azerbaijan	1–0	2–1	UEFA Euro 2016 qualification
6	10 October 2014	Stadio Renzo Barbera, Palermo, Italy	Azerbaijan	2–1	2–1	UEFA Euro 2016 qualification
7	27 June 2016	Stade de France, Saint-Denis, France	Spain	1–0	2–0	UEFA Euro 2016
8	6 October 2017	Stadio Olimpico Grande Torino, Turin, Italy	North Macedonia	1–0	1–1	2018 FIFA World Cup qualification

== Honours ==
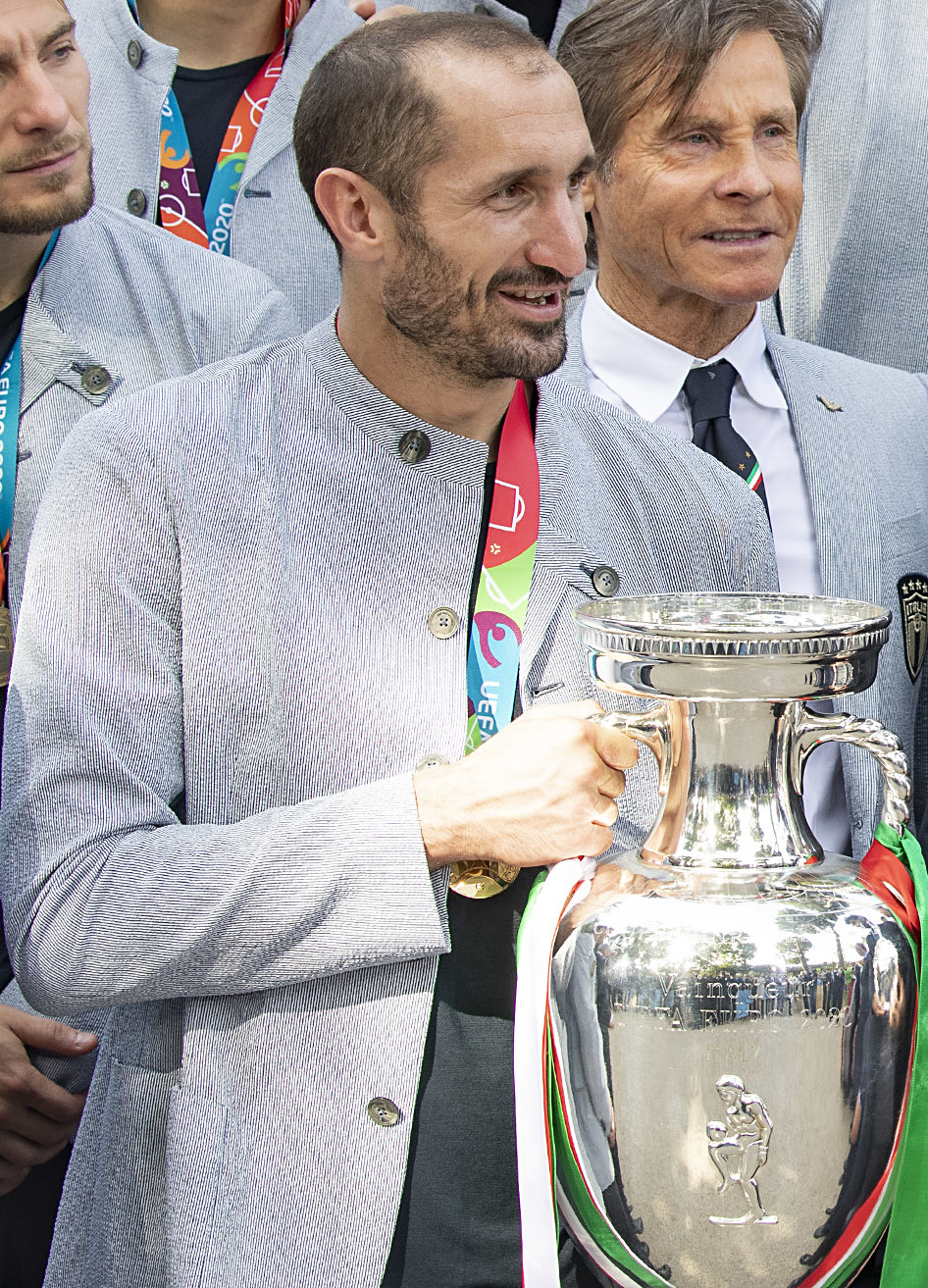
Chiellini holding the UEFA European Championship trophy, his only international trophy for Italy

Livorno

- Serie C1: 2001–02

Juventus

- Serie A: 2011–12, 2012–13, 2013–14, 2014–15, 2015–16, 2016–17, 2017–18, 2018–19, 2019–20
- Serie B: 2006–07
- Coppa Italia: 2014–15, 2015–16, 2016–17, 2017–18, 2020–21; runner-up: 2011–12
- Supercoppa Italiana: 2012, 2013, 2015, 2018, 2020
- UEFA Champions League runner-up: 2014–15, 2016–17

Los Angeles FC

- MLS Cup: 2022; runner-up: 2023
- Supporters' Shield: 2022
- CONCACAF Champions League runner-up: 2023

Italy U19

- UEFA European Under-19 Championship: 2003

Italy Olympic Team

- Summer Olympic Games bronze medal: 2004

Italy

- UEFA European Championship: 2020; runner-up: 2012
- FIFA Confederations Cup bronze medal: 2013
- UEFA Nations League bronze medal: 2020–21

Individual

- Serie A Team of the Year: 2012–13, 2014–15, 2015–16, 2017–18, 2018–19
- Serie A Defender of the Year: 2008, 2009, 2010
- UEFA Team of the Year: 2017
- UEFA Champions League Squad of the Season: 2014–15, 2017–18
- ESM Team of the Year: 2012–13, 2014–15, 2017–18
- France Football World XI: 2015
- Juventus Player of the Year: 2021–22
- Juventus Greatest XI of All Time: 2017
- UEFA European Under-21 Championship Team of the Tournament: 2007
- All-time UEFA European Under-21 Championship Dream Team: 2015
- Premio Nazionale Carriera Esemplare "Gaetano Scirea": 2019
- IFFHS Men's UEFA Team of the Year: 2021
- Juventus FC Hall of Fame: 2025

Orders

- 4th Class / Officer: Ufficiale Ordine al Merito della Repubblica Italiana: 2021

- 5th Class / Knight: Cavaliere Ordine al Merito della Repubblica Italiana: 2004

== See also ==
- List of footballers with 100 or more international caps
