= 1993–94 AC Fiorentina season =

Associazione Calcio Fiorentina
1993–94 season
- President: Vittorio Cecchi Gori
- Manager: Claudio Ranieri
- Stadium: Artemio Franchi
- Serie B: Champions (promoted to 1994–95 Serie A)
- Coppa Italia: Round of 16
- Top goalscorer: League: Gabriel Batistuta (16); All: Gabriel Batistuta (19)
| Home colours | Away colours |

The 1993–94 campaign was Fiorentina's 67th season in existence and its first in Serie B since 1938. Also, the club played in Coppa Italia.

== Summary ==
The team finished the Serie B season in first place and were thus promoted back up to Serie A.

Following the enforced relegation, President Cecci Gori appointed Claudio Ranieri as the new club head coach, the squad lost Brian Laudrup to AC Milan. However, international stars Argentine Forward Gabriel Batistuta and German Midfielder Stefan Effenberg stayed at the club. Young Goalkeeper Francesco Toldo had his breakthrough season as starter, meanwhile Defender Alberto Malusci, midfielders Massimo Orlando and Stefano Pioli and Forward Anselmo Robbiati were crutial to clinch the first spot.

== Players ==
Note: Flags indicate national team as defined under FIFA eligibility rules; some limited exceptions apply. Players may hold more than one non-FIFA nationality.

| Pos. | Nation | Player |
|---|---|---|
| GK | ITA | Francesco Toldo |
| GK | ITA | Cristiano Scalabrelli |
| DF | ITA | Daniele Carnasciali |
| DF | ITA | Gianluca Luppi |
| DF | ITA | Alberto Malusci |
| DF | ITA | Stefano Pioli |
| DF | ITA | Pasquale Bruno |
| DF | ITA | Mario Faccenda |
| DF | ITA | Lorenzo D'Anna |
| DF | ITA | Fabio Di Sole |
| DF | ITA | Giuseppe Antonaccio |
| MF | ITA | Daniele Amerini |
| MF | ITA | Giovanni Tedesco |
| MF | ITA | Daniele Amerini |
| MF | ITA | Sergio Campolo |

| Pos. | Nation | Player |
|---|---|---|
| MF | ITA | Massimo Orlando |
| MF | ITA | Edoardo Sacchini |
| MF | ITA | Daniele Girardi |
| MF | ITA | Mauro Zironelli |
| MF | GER | Stefan Effenberg |
| MF | ITA | Giuseppe Iachini |
| MF | ITA | Mario Faccenda |
| FW | ITA | Francesco Baiano |
| FW | ARG | Gabriel Batistuta |
| FW | ITA | Francesco Flachi |
| FW | ITA | Anselmo Robbiati |
| FW | ITA | Giacomo Banchelli |
| FW | ITA | Daniele Beltrammi |
| FW | ITA | Eddy Baggio |

=== Transfers ===
In
| Pos. | Name | from | Type |
|---|---|---|---|
| GK | Francesco Toldo | AC Milan | |
| DF | Pasquale Bruno | Torino | |
| MF | Giovanni Tedesco | Reggina | |
| MF | Mauro Zironelli | Pescara | |
| FW | Anselmo Robbiati | AC Monza | |
| FW | Giacomo Banchelli | Alessandria | loan |

Out
| Pos. | Name | To | Type |
|---|---|---|---|
| FW | Brian Laudrup | AC Milan | loan |
| MF | Diego Latorre | CD Tenerife | |
| MF | Rufo Emiliano Verga | AC Milan | |
| MF | Stefano Carobbi | US Lecce | |
| MF | Andrea Vascotto | Reggina | |
| MF | Fabrizio Di Mauro | SS Lazio | loan |
| GK | Gianmatteo Mareggini | Palermo | loan |

==== Winter ====
In
| Pos. | Name | from | Type |

Out
| Pos. | Name | To | Type |
|---|---|---|---|
| DF | Vittorio Tosto | Salernitana | |
| MF | Antonio Dell'Oglio | AC Monza | |

== Competitions ==
=== Serie B ===
==== League table ====
| Pos | Team | Pld | W | D | L | GF | GA | GD | Pts | Promotion or relegation |
|---|---|---|---|---|---|---|---|---|---|---|
| 1 | Fiorentina (P, C) | 38 | 17 | 16 | 5 | 53 | 19 | +34 | 50 | Promotion to Serie A |
| 2 | Bari (P) | 38 | 14 | 17 | 7 | 49 | 27 | +22 | 45 | Promotion to Serie A |
| 3 | Brescia (P) | 38 | 15 | 14 | 9 | 68 | 53 | +15 | 44 | Promotion to Serie A |
| 4 | Padova (P) | 38 | 11 | 21 | 6 | 37 | 29 | +8 | 43 | Serie A after tie-breaker |
| 5 | Cesena | 38 | 17 | 9 | 12 | 49 | 48 | +1 | 43 | Promotion tie-breaker |

Source: Head-to-head points used for three or more clubs finishing at the same result.
(C) Champions; (P) Promoted

==== Results by round ====
| Round | 1 | 2 | 3 | 4 | 5 | 6 | 7 | 8 | 9 | 10 | 11 | 12 | 13 | 14 | 15 | 16 | 17 | 18 | 19 | 20 | 21 | 22 | 23 | 24 | 25 | 26 | 27 | 28 | 29 | 30 | 31 | 32 | 33 | 34 | 35 | 36 | 37 | 38 |
|---|---|---|---|---|---|---|---|---|---|---|---|---|---|---|---|---|---|---|---|---|---|---|---|---|---|---|---|---|---|---|---|---|---|---|---|---|---|---|
| Ground | A | H | A | H | H | A | H | A | A | H | A | H | A | H | A | H | A | H | A | H | A | H | A | A | H | A | H | H | A | H | A | H | A | H | A | H | A | H |
| Result | W | W | D | D | W | D | W | D | W | D | W | W | D | W | L | W | D | W | L | W | W | W | D | L | W | D | W | D | L | D | D | W | D | W | D | D | D | L |
| Position | 1 | 1 | 1 | 1 | 1 | 1 | 1 | 1 | 1 | 1 | 1 | 1 | 1 | 1 | 1 | 1 | 1 | 1 | 1 | 1 | 1 | 1 | 1 | 1 | 1 | 1 | 1 | 1 | 1 | 1 | 1 | 1 | 1 | 1 | 1 | 1 | 1 | 1 |

Source: http://calcio-seriea.net/allenatori_squadra/1993/2758/
A = Away; H = Home; W = Win; D = Draw; L = Loss; = Leader, Promoted to 1994–95 Serie A; = Promoted to 1994–95 Serie A; = Qualified to 1994–95 Serie A Promotion tie-breaker.; = Qualified to 1994–95 Serie C1 Relegation tie-breaker; = Relegated to 1994–95 Serie C1

==== Matches ====
- .- Source:http://calcio-seriea.net/partite/1993/2758/

| 29 August 1993 1 | Palermo | 0–3 | Fiorentina | Palermo |
| | | Report | 12' Banchelli; 48', 84' Robbiati | Stadium: La Favorita; Referee: Rosica |

| 5 September 1993 2 | Fiorentina | 4–0 | Venezia | Florence |
| | Effenberg 33', 52'; Banchelli 49'; Robbiati 89' | Report | | Stadium: Artemio Franchi; Referee: Cinciripini |

| 12 September 1993 3 | Cosenza | 1–1 | Fiorentina | Cosenza |
| | Maiellaro 54' | Report | 59' Luppi | Stadium: San Vito; Referee: Fucci |

| 19 September 1993 4 | Fiorentina | 1–1 | Vicenza | Florence |
| | Orlando 7' | Report | 58' Viviani | Stadium: Artemio Franchi; Referee: Pacifici |

| 25 September 1993 5 | Fiorentina | 2–1 | Brescia | Florence |
| | Batistuta 9' (pen.); M. Orlando 53' | Report | 60' (o.g.) Bruno | Stadium: Artemio Franchi; Referee: Amendolia |

| 3 October 1993 6 | Padova | 0–0 | Fiorentina | Padua |
| | | Report | | Stadium: Appiani; Referee: Baldas |

| 10 October 1993 7 | Fiorentina | 4–1 | Pisa | Florence |
| | Batistuta 20', 57', 74'; Effenberg 49' | Report | 28' Rocco | Stadium: Artemio Franchi; Referee: Cesari |

| 17 October 1993 8 | Fidelis Andria | 0–0 | Fiorentina | Andria |
| | | Report | | Stadium: Degli Ulivi; Referee: Stafoggia |

| 23 October 1993 9 | SSC Bari | 0–1 | Fiorentina | Bari |
| | | Report | 90' Banchelli | Stadium: San Nicola; Referee: Trentalange |

| 31 October 1993 10 | Fiorentina | 0–0 | Pescara | Florence |
| | | Report | | Stadium: Artemio Franchi; Referee: Bettin |

| 14 November 1993 11 | Modena | 0–1 | Fiorentina | Modena |
| | | Report | 55' Banchelli | Stadium: Braglia; Referee: Pellegrino |

| 21 November 1993 12 | Fiorentina | 2–0 | Ravenna | Florence |
| | Mengucci 65' (o.g.); Malusci 90' | Report | | Stadium: Stadio Artemio Franchi; Referee: Brignoccoli |

| 28 November 1993 13 | Acireale | 0–0 | Fiorentina | Acireale |
| | | Report | | Stadium: Stadio Aci e Galatea; Referee: Cardona |

| 5 December 1993 14 | Fiorentina | 3–0 | Ancona | Florence |
| | Batistuta 42', 90'; Effenberg 63' | Report | | Stadium: Stadio Artemio Franchi; Referee: Arena |

| 11 December 1993 15 | Ascoli | 1–0 | Fiorentina | Ascoli Piceno |
| | Zanoncelli 15' | Report | | Stadium: Stadio Cino e Lillo Del Duca; Referee: Treossi |

| 19 December 1993 16 | Fiorentina | 2–0 | Hellas Verona | Florence |
| | Zironelli 61'; Banchelli 90' (pen.) | Report | | Stadium: Stadio Artemio Franchi; Referee: Fucci |

| 2 January 1994 17 | Lucchese 1905 | 1–1 | Fiorentina | Lucca |
| | Paci 89' | Report | 9' Batistuta | Stadium: Stadio Porta Elisa; Referee: Pairetto (Nichelino) |

| 9 January 1994 18 | Fiorentina | 3–0 | AC Monza | Florence |
| | Luppi 33'; Batistuta 42', 90' | Report | | Stadium: Stadio Artemio Franchi; Referee: Tombolini |

| 16 January 1994 19 | Cesena | 1–0 | Fiorentina | Cesena |
| | Scarafoni 48' (o.g.) | Report | | Stadium: Stadio Dino Manuzzi; Referee: Boggi |

| 23 January 1994 20 | Fiorentina | 4–1 | Palermo | Florence |
| | Battaglia 51' (o.g.); Effenberg 53'; Batistuta 59'; Malusci 63' (o.g.) | Report | 80' Biffi | Stadium: Stadio Artemio Franchi; Referee: Borriello (Mantova) |

| 30 January 1994 21 | Venezia | 0–2 | Fiorentina | Venice |
| | | Report | 15' Effenberg; 16' Batistuta | Stadium: Stadio Pierluigi Penzo; Referee: Cardona |

| 6 February 1994 22 | Fiorentina | 3–0 | Cosenza | Florence |
| | Effenberg 35'; Flachi 54'; Batistuta 87' | Report | | Stadium: Stadio Artemio Franchi; Referee: Pellegrino (Barcellona Pozzo di Gotto) |

| 13 February 1994 23 | Vicenza | 0–0 | Fiorentina | Vicenza |
| | | Report | | Stadium: Romeo Menti; Referee: Bolognino |

| 20 February 1994 24 | Brescia | 3–1 | Fiorentina | Brescia |
| | Bonometti 43' (o.g.), 47' (o.g.); Piovanelli 64' (o.g.) | Report | 40' (pen.) Batistuta | Stadium: Mario Rigamonti; Referee: Arena |

| 27 February 1994 25 | Fiorentina | 2–0 | Padova | Florence |
| | Faccenda 73'; Flachi 85'} | Report | | Stadium: Artemio Franchi; Referee: Pairetto |

| 6 March 1994 26 | Pisa | 0–0 | Fiorentina | Pisa |
| | | Report | | Stadium: Arena Garibaldi; Referee: Beschin |

| 13 March 1994 27 | Fiorentina | 3–1 | Fidelis Andria | Florence |
| | Orlando 8'; Batistuta 29'; Robbiati 47' | Report | 62' A. Bianchi | Stadium: Artemio Franchi; Referee: Boggi |

| 27 March 1994 28 | Fiorentina | 0–0 | SSC Bari | Florence |
| | | Report | | Stadium: Stadio Artemio Franchi; Referee: Bazzoli |

| 2 April 1994 29 | Pescara | 1–0 | Fiorentina | Pescara |
| | Massara 60' | Report | | Stadium: Adriatico; Referee: Quartuccio |

| 9 April 1994 30 | Fiorentina | 0–0 | Modena FC | Florence |
| | | Report | | Stadium: Stadio Artemio Franchi; Referee: Tombolini |

| 17 April 1994 31 | Ravenna | 0–0 | Fiorentina | Ravenna |
| | | Report | | Stadium: Bruno Benelli; Referee: Cesari |

| 24 April 1994 32 | Fiorentina | 1–0 | Acireale | Florence |
| | Tedesco 68' | Report | | Stadium: Artemio Franchi; Referee: Trentalange |

| 1 May 1994 33 | Ancona Calcio | 1–1 | Fiorentina | Ancona |
| | Caccia 90' | Report | 45' Luppi | Stadium: Del Conero; Referee: Rosica |

| 8 May 1994 34 | Fiorentina | 5–1 | Ascoli | Florence |
| | Batistuta 36', 54'; Robbiati 44', 74'; Baiano 90' (o.g.) | Report | 83' Bierhoff | Stadium: Artemio Franchi; Referee: Racalbuto |

| 15 May 1994 35 | Hellas Verona | 0–0 | Fiorentina | Verona |
| | | Report | | Stadium: Marcantonio Bentegodi; Referee: Pacifici |

| 22 May 1994 36 | Fiorentina | 1–1 | Lucchese 1905 | Florence |
| | Baiano 61' (pen.) | Report | 13' Altomare | Stadium: Artemio Franchi; Referee: Bolognino |

| 29 May 1994 37 | AC Monza | 0–0 | Fiorentina | Monza |
| | | Report | | Stadium: Brianteo; Referee: Borriello |

| 5 June 1994 38 | Fiorentina | 2–3 | Cesena | Florence |
| | Baiano 25' (pen.), 78' (pen.) | Report | 3' Calcaterra; 11' (pen.), 45' Scarafoni | Referee: Boggi |

=== Coppa Italia ===
==== Round 1 ====
| 22 August 1993 1 | Fiorentina | 2–0 | Empoli | Florence |
| 20:30 | Robbiati 57'; Banchelli 68' | | | Stadium: Artemio Franchi; Referee: Stafoggia |

==== Round 2 ====
| 6 October 1993 1 | Fiorentina | 3–0 | Reggiana | Florence |
| 20:30 | Batistuta 12', 67'; Zanutta 17' (o.g.) | | | Stadium: Artemio Franchi; Attendance: 18,000; Referee: Bazzoli |

| 27 October 1993 2 | A.C. Reggiana | 0–0 | Fiorentina | Reggio Emilia |
| 20:30 | | | | Stadium: Mirabello; Referee: Franceschini |

==== Eightfinals ====
| 2 December 1993 1 | Fiorentina | 1–2 | Venezia FC | Florence |
| 20:30 | Batistuta 61' | | 57', 65' Cerbone | Stadium: Artemio Franchi; Referee: Rodomonti |

| 15 December 1993 3 | Venezia FC | 0–0 (2–1 agg.) | Fiorentina | Venice |
| 20:30 | | | | Stadium: Pierluigi Penzo; Referee: Baldas |

== Statistics ==
=== Players statistics ===
| No. | Pos | Nat | Player | Total | | Serie A | | Coppa | |
| No. | Pos | Nat | Player | Apps | Goals | Apps | Goals | Apps | Goals |
|---|---|---|---|---|---|---|---|---|---|
| | GK | (Italy) ITA | Francesco Toldo | 38 | -16 | 33 | -14 | 5 | -2 |
| | DF | (Italy) ITA | Daniele Carnasciali | 39 | 0 | 35 | 0 | 4 | 0 |
| | DF | (Italy) ITA | Gianluca Luppi | 37 | 3 | 33 | 3 | 4 | 0 |
| | DF | (Italy) ITA | Alberto Malusci | 38 | 2 | 30+3 | 2 | 5 | 0 |
| | DF | (Italy) ITA | Stefano Pioli | 35 | 0 | 28+2 | 0 | 5 | 0 |
| | MF | (Germany) GER | Stefan Effenberg | 30 | 7 | 26 | 7 | 4 | 0 |
| | MF | (Italy) ITA | Giuseppe Iachini | 38 | 0 | 34 | 0 | 4 | 0 |
| | MF | (Italy) ITA | Giovanni Tedesco | 28 | 1 | 26 | 1 | 2 | 0 |
| | MF | (Italy) ITA | Massimo Orlando | 24 | 2 | 19 | 2 | 5 | 0 |
| | FW | (Argentina) ARG | Gabriel Batistuta | 29 | 19 | 26 | 16 | 3 | 3 |
| | FW | (Italy) ITA | Anselmo Robbiati | 35 | 7 | 28+3 | 6 | 4 | 1 |
| | GK | (Italy) ITA | Cristiano Scalabrelli | 5 | -5 | 5 | -5 | 0 | 0 |
| | DF | (Italy) ITA | Pasquale Bruno | 22 | 0 | 18 | 0 | 4 | 0 |
| | FW | (Italy) ITA | Giacomo Banchelli | 23 | 6 | 13+6 | 5 | 4 | 1 |
| | MF | (Italy) ITA | Mauro Zironelli | 24 | 1 | 12+9 | 1 | 3 | 0 |
| | DF | (Italy) ITA | Mario Faccenda | 15 | 1 | 9+6 | 1 | | |
| | FW | (Italy) ITA | Francesco Baiano | 11 | 4 | 8+3 | 4 | | |
| | MF | (Italy) ITA | Sergio Campolo | 17 | 0 | 7+7 | 0 | 3 | 0 |
| | MF | (Italy) ITA | Daniele Amerini | 16 | 0 | 6+8 | 0 | 2 | 0 |
| | FW | (Italy) ITA | Francesco Flachi | 10 | 2 | 6+4 | 2 | | |
| | DF | (Italy) ITA | Giuseppe Antonaccio | 9 | 0 | 4+4 | 0 | 1 | 0 |
| | FW | (Italy) ITA | Daniele Beltrammi | 10 | 0 | 3+7 | 0 | | |
| | DF | (Italy) ITA | Lorenzo D'Anna | 7 | 0 | 3+2 | 0 | 2 | 0 |
| | MF | (Italy) ITA | Antonio Dell'Oglio | 4 | 0 | 3+1 | 0 | | |
| | DF | (Italy) ITA | Fabio Di Sole | 3 | 0 | 2+1 | 0 | | |
| | DF | (Italy) ITA | Vittorio Tosto | 7 | 0 | 1+6 | 0 | | |
| | MF | (Italy) ITA | E. Sacchini | 1 | 0 | 0+1 | 0 | | |
| | FW | (Italy) ITA | Eddy Baggio | 0 | 0 | 0 | 0 | | |
| | GK | (Italy) ITA | Davide Dei | 0 | 0 | 0 | 0 | | |
| | FW | (Italy) ITA | Daniele Giraldi | 0 | 0 | 0 | 0 | | |
| | GK | (Italy) ITA | Gianmatteo Mareggini | 0 | 0 | 0 | 0 | | |
| | MF | (Italy) ITA | Cristiano Zanetti | 0 | 0 | 0 | 0 | | |

- Source: http://calcio-seriea.net/presenze/1993/2758/
