= 1994–95 AC Fiorentina season =

Fiorentina
1994–95 season
- President: Vittorio Cecchi Gori
- Manager: Claudio Ranieri
- Stadium: Artemio Franchi
- Serie A: 10th
- Coppa Italia: Quarter-finals
- Top goalscorer: League: Gabriel Batistuta (26); All: Gabriel Batistuta (28)
Home colours	Away colours

Associazione Calcio Fiorentina returned to Serie A, following the 1993 relegation, and immediately established itself as a mid-table side once again. Portuguese playmaker Rui Costa and Brazilian World Champion defender Márcio Santos were the two main signings in the summer, and both of them were key players for the team. Rui Costa also established the special partnership with star striker Gabriel Batistuta that was going to be the key ingredient for the coming five years in Fiorentina's ascent towards the top of Italian football. Batistuta became league topscorer with 26 goals, many of them provided by Rui Costa's passes.

== Players ==
Note: Flags indicate national team as defined under FIFA eligibility rules; some limited exceptions apply. Players may hold more than one non-FIFA nationality.

Pos.	Nation	Player
GK	ITA	Francesco Toldo
DF	ITA	Daniele Carnasciali
DF	ITA	Gianluca Luppi
DF	ITA	Alberto Malusci
DF	BRA	Márcio Santos
DF	ITA	Stefano Pioli
MF	ITA	Andrea Sottil
MF	ITA	Daniele Amerini
MF	ITA	Angelo Carbone

Pos.	Nation	Player
MF	ITA	Sandro Cois
MF	ITA	Fabrizio Di Mauro
MF	POR	Rui Costa
MF	ITA	Giovanni Tedesco
MF	ITA	Cristiano Zanetti
FW	ITA	Francesco Baiano
FW	ARG	Gabriel Batistuta
FW	ITA	Francesco Flachi
FW	ITA	Anselmo Robbiati

=== Transfers ===
In
Pos.	Name	from	Type
MF	Rui Costa	Benfica	
DF	Marcio Santos	Bordeaux	
MF	Angelo Carbone	Milan	loan
MF	Sandro Cois	Torino	
MF	Fabrizio Di Mauro	Lazio	loan ended
DF	Stefano Carobbi	Lecce	loan ended
MF	Andrea Sottil	Torino	

Out
Pos.	Name	To	Type
MF	Stefan Effenberg	Borussia Mönchengladbach	loan
MF	Mauro Zironelli	ChievoVerona	
MF	Giuseppe Iachini	Palermo	
MF	Massimo Orlando	Milan	
DF	Lorenzo D'Anna	ChievoVerona	
DF	Stefano Carobbi	Pongiobonsi	
DF	Mario Faccenda	Carrarese	

==== Winter ====
In
Pos.	Name	from	Type
DF	Enzo Gambaro	AC Reggiana	loan

Out
Pos.	Name	To	Type
DF	Pasquale Bruno	Lecce	

== Competitions ==
=== Serie A ===
==== League table ====
Pos	Team	Pld	W	D	L	GF	GA	GD	Pts
8	Sampdoria	34	13	11	10	51	37	+14	50
9	Cagliari	34	13	10	11	40	39	+1	49
10	Fiorentina	34	12	11	11	61	57	+4	47
11	Torino	34	12	9	13	44	48	−4	45
12	Bari	34	12	8	14	40	43	−3	44

Source: Serie A, RSSSF.com, Soccerway
Rules for classification: 1) Points; 2) Head-to-head points; 3) Head-to-head goal difference; 4) Goal difference; 5) Goals scored; 6) Draw. (Note: Head-to-head record is used only after all the matches between the teams in question have been played).

==== Results summary ====
Overall								Home						Away					
Pld	W	D	L	GF	GA	GD	Pts	W	D	L	GF	GA	GD	W	D	L	GF	GA	GD
34	12	11	11	61	57	+4	47	9	6	2	39	21	+18	3	5	9	22	36	−14

Last updated: 25 July 2015.
Source: Competitive matches

==== Results by round ====
Round	1	2	3	4	5	6	7	8	9	10	11	12	13	14	15	16	17	18	19	20	21	22	23	24	25	26	27	28	29	30	31	32	33	34
Ground	H	A	H	A	H	A	H	A	H	A	H	A	H	H	A	H	A	A	H	A	H	A	H	A	H	A	H	A	H	A	A	H	A	H
Result	W	D	W	L	D	D	W	W	W	W	D	L	W	D	L	D	L	L	W	D	D	L	D	W	W	D	W	D	L	L	L	W	L	L
Position	1	4	2	4	5	9	5	4	2	2	3	4	3	3	4	4	6	7	6	6	6	8	8	6	6	7	7	6	7	8	9	8	9	10

Source: Competitive matches
A = Away; H = Home; W = Win; D = Draw; L = Loss; = Leader, 1995–96 UEFA Champions League Group stage; = 1995–96 UEFA Cup First round

==== Matches ====
4 September 1994 1	Fiorentina	2–1	Cagliari	Florence
	Napoli 11' (o.g.); Batistuta 80'	Report	Herrera 75' (pen.)	Stadium: Stadio Artemio Franchi; Referee: Robert Anthony Boggi

11 September 1994 2	Genoa	1–1	Fiorentina	Genoa
	Malusci 78' (o.g.)	Report	Batistuta 70'	Stadium: Stadio Luigi Ferraris; Referee: Roberto Bettin

18 September 1994 3	Fiorentina	3–1	Cremonese	Florence
	Carnasciali 14'; Batistuta 20', 59'	Report	Tentoni 17'	Stadium: Stadio Artemio Franchi; Referee: Graziano Cesari

25 September 1994 4	Internazionale	3–1	Fiorentina	Milan
	Pančev 2'; Sosa 27' (pen.), 83'	Report	Batistuta 11'	Stadium: San Siro; Referee: Loris Stafoggia

2 October 1994 5	Fiorentina	1–1	Lazio	Florence
	Batistuta 60'	Report	Bergodi 90'	Stadium: Stadio Artemio Franchi; Referee: Gianni Beschin

16 October 1994 6	Reggiana	1–1	Fiorentina	Reggio Emilia
	Bresciani 39'	Report	Batistuta 61' (pen.)	Stadium: Stadio Giglio; Referee: Angelo Amendolia

23 October 1994 7	Fiorentina	4–1	Padova	Florence
	Di Mauro 31'; Rui Costa 52'; Carbone 55'; Batistuta 57' (pen.)	Report	Balleri 27'	Stadium: Stadio Artemio Franchi; Referee: Marcello Cardona

30 October 1994 8	Brescia	2–4	Fiorentina	Brescia
	Gallo 70'; Ambrosetti 77'	Report	Batistuta 31'; Di Mauro 41'; Flachi 62'; Rui Costa 76'	Stadium: Stadio Mario Rigamonti; Referee: Graziano Cesari

6 November 1994 9	Fiorentina	2–0	Bari	Florence
	Cois 7'; Batistuta 75' (pen.)	Report		Stadium: Stadio Artemio Franchi; Referee: Pasquale Rodomonti

20 November 1994 10	Napoli	2–5	Fiorentina	Naples
	Agostini 56', 59'	Report	André Cruz 15' (o.g.); Cannavaro 73' (o.g.); Cois 81'; Batistuta 84', 90' (pen.)	Stadium: Stadio San Paolo; Referee: Pierluigi Pairetto

27 November 1994 11	Fiorentina	2–2	Sampdoria	Florence
	Batistuta 60' (pen.); Vierchowod 73' (o.g.)	Report	Platt 39' (pen.); Gullit 88'	Stadium: Stadio Artemio Franchi; Referee: Roberto Bettin

4 December 1994 12	Juventus	3–2	Fiorentina	Turin
	Vialli 73', 76'; Del Piero 87'	Report	Baiano 24'; Carbone 35'	Stadium: Stadio delle Alpi; Referee: Loris Stafoggia

11 December 1994 13	Fiorentina	1–0	Roma	Florence
	Carboni 73' (o.g.)	Report		Stadium: Stadio Artemio Franchi; Referee: Angelo Amendolia

18 December 1994 14	Fiorentina	1–1	Foggia	Florence
	Batistuta 54' (pen.)	Report	Cappellini 25'	Stadium: Stadio Artemio Franchi; Referee: Fiorenzo Treossi

8 January 1995 15	Torino	1–0	Fiorentina	Turin
	Pessotto 36'	Report		Stadium: Stadio delle Alpi; Referee: Robert Anthony Boggi

15 January 1995 16	Fiorentina	1–1	Parma	Florence
	Batistuta 9'	Report	Pin 47'	Stadium: Stadio Artemio Franchi; Referee: Livio Bazzoli

22 January 1995 17	Milan	2–0	Fiorentina	Milan
	Desailly 78'; Di Canio 84'	Report		Stadium: San Siro; Referee: Walter Cinciripini

29 January 1995 18	Cagliari	2–0	Fiorentina	Cagliari
	Muzzi 32'; Herrera 90' (pen.)	Report		Stadium: Stadio Sant'Elia; Referee: Pierluigi Pairetto

12 February 1995 19	Fiorentina	3–1	Genoa	Florence
	Batistuta 23', 57'; Rui Costa 26'	Report	Skuhravý 37' (pen.)	Stadium: Stadio Artemio Franchi; Referee: Alfredo Trentalange

19 February 1995 20	Cremonese	0–0	Fiorentina	Cremona
		Report		Stadium: Stadio Giovanni Zini; Referee: Livio Bazzoli

26 February 1995 21	Fiorentina	2–2	Internazionale	Florence
	Rui Costa 43'; Batistuta 75'	Report	Berti 34'; Orlandini 67'	Stadium: Stadio Artemio Franchi; Referee: Giuseppe Rosica

5 March 1995 22	Lazio	8–2	Fiorentina	Rome
	Casiraghi 4', 49', 82', 89' (pen.); Negro 30'; Cravero 35' (pen.); Bokšić 57'; Di Vaio 86'	Report	Rui Costa 60'; Batistuta 74' (pen.)	Stadium: Stadio Olimpico; Referee: Fiorenzo Treossi

12 March 1995 23	Fiorentina	1–1	Reggiana	Florence
	Carbone 87'	Report	Esposito 28'	Stadium: Stadio Artemio Franchi; Referee: Pasquale Rodomonti

19 March 1995 24	Padova	0–1	Fiorentina	Padua
		Report	Rui Costa 62'	Stadium: Stadio Euganeo; Referee: Alfredo Trentalange

2 April 1995 25	Fiorentina	4–0	Brescia	Florence
	Di Mauro 4'; Batistuta 11'; Rui Costa 58'; Flachi 88'	Report		Stadium: Stadio Artemio Franchi; Referee: Giancarlo Lana

9 April 1995 26	Bari	2–2	Fiorentina	Bari
	Márcio Santos 21' (o.g.); Protti 31'	Report	Carnasciali 40'; Carbone 76'	Stadium: Stadio San Nicola; Referee: Salvatore Racalbuto

15 April 1995 27	Fiorentina	4–0	Napoli	Florence
	Sottil 17'; Márcio Santos 47'; Batistuta 55'; Flachi 72'	Report		Stadium: Stadio Artemio Franchi; Referee: Gianni Beschin

23 April 1995 28	Sampdoria	2–2	Fiorentina	Genoa
	Gullit 9', 72'	Report	Batistuta 75'; Baiano 79'	Stadium: Stadio Luigi Ferraris; Referee: Cosimo Bolognino

29 April 1995 29	Fiorentina	1–4	Juventus	Florence
	Batistuta 70'	Report	Vialli 7'; R. Baggio 68'; Ravanelli 85'; Marocchi 86'	Stadium: Stadio Artemio Franchi; Referee: Loris Stafoggia

7 May 1995 30	Roma	2–0	Fiorentina	Rome
	Balbo 15'; Totti 81'	Report		Stadium: Stadio Olimpico; Referee: Pasquale Rodomonti

14 May 1995 31	Foggia	2–1	Fiorentina	Foggia
	Kolyvanov 46'; Cappellini 83'	Report	Rui Costa 10'	Stadium: Stadio Pino Zaccheria; Referee: Alfredo Trentalange

21 May 1995 32	Fiorentina	6–3	Torino	Florence
	Pellegrini 25' (o.g.); Batistuta 35', 90' (pen.); Tedesco 49'; Márcio Santos 56'; Rui Costa 80'	Report	Márcio Santos 27' (o.g.); Rizzitelli 75' (pen.), 88'	Stadium: Stadio Artemio Franchi; Referee: Walter Cinciripini

28 May 1995 33	Parma	3–0	Fiorentina	Parma
	Branca 75', 84'; Zola 80' (pen.)	Report		Stadium: Stadio Ennio Tardini; Referee: Salvatore Racalbuto

4 June 1995 34	Fiorentina	1–2	Milan	Florence
	Batistuta 42'	Report	Melli 5'; Simone 79' (pen.)	Stadium: Stadio Artemio Franchi; Referee: Virginio Quartuccio

=== Coppa Italia ===
==== Second round ====
8 September 1994 First leg	Udinese	2–2	Fiorentina	Ferrara
	Carnevale 10'; Marino 19'		40' (pen.) Baiano; 43' Malusci	Stadium: Paolo Mazza; Referee: Angelo Amendolia

21 September 1994 Second leg	Fiorentina	2–0 (4–2 agg.)	Udinese	Florence
	Campolo 52'; Robbiati 72'			Stadium: Artemio Franchi; Referee: Livio Bazzoli

==== Round of 16 ====
12 October 1994 First leg	Fiorentina	2–1	Sampdoria	Florence
	Robbiati 72'; Batistuta 87'		4' Melli; (red card) 89' Invernizzi	Stadium: Stadio Artemio Franchi; Referee: Giuseppe Rosica

26 October 1994 Second leg	Sampdoria	1–1 (2–3 agg.)	Fiorentina	Genoa
	Melli 77' (pen.)		54' Batistuta	Stadium: Stadio Luigi Ferraris; Referee: Alfredo Trentalange

==== Quarter-finals ====
30 November 1994 1	Parma	2–0	Fiorentina	Parma
20:00 CEST (UTC+01:00)	Couto (yellow card) 5'; Zola 45'; Branca 52'	Report	(red card) 5' Baiano; (yellow card) 17' Amerini; (yellow card) 66' Luppi	Stadium: Il Tardini; Attendance: 13,492; Referee: Alfredo Trentalange

15 December 1994 2	Fiorentina	1–2 (1–4 agg.)	Parma	Florence
20:40 CEST (UTC+01:00)	Sensini 58' (o.g.); Malusci (yellow card); Luppi (yellow card)	Report	Zola 49'; Branca 70'; Crippa (yellow card)	Stadium: Stadio Artemio Franchi; Attendance: 20,000; Referee: Walter Cinciripini

== Statistics ==
=== Players statistics ===
No.	Pos	Nat	Player	Total		Serie A		Coppa	
No.	Pos	Nat	Player	Apps	Goals	Apps	Goals	Apps	Goals
	GK	(Italy) ITA	Toldo	39	-62	34	-56	5	-6
	DF	(Italy) ITA	Carnasciali	27	2	24	2	3	0
	DF	(Italy) ITA	Malusci	36	1	30	0	6	1
	DF	(Brazil) BRA	Márcio Santos	38	2	32	2	6	0
	DF	(Italy) ITA	Pioli	30	0	24	0	6	0
	MF	(Italy) ITA	Carbone	31	4	23+4	4	4	0
	MF	(Italy) ITA	Cois	30	3	27	3	3	0
	MF	(Italy) ITA	Di Mauro	31	3	28	3	3	0
	MF	(Portugal) POR	Rui Costa	35	9	30+1	9	4	0
	FW	(Italy) ITA	Baiano	32	3	26+1	2	5	1
	FW	(Argentina) ARG	Batistuta	37	28	32	26	5	2
	GK	(Italy) ITA	Scalabrelli	3	-3	0+2	-1	1	-2
	DF	(Italy) ITA	Luppi	28	0	19+4	0	5	0
	FW	(Italy) ITA	Robbiati	19	2	12+3	0	4	2
	MF	(Italy) ITA	Sottil	17	1	11+6	1		
	FW	(Italy) ITA	Flachi	24	2	9+12	2	3	0
	MF	(Italy) ITA	Tedesco	24	1	8+13	1	3	0
	MF	(Italy) ITA	Amerini	15	0	2+11	0	2	0
	DF	(Italy) ITA	Gambaro	3	0	1+1	0	1	0
	MF	(Italy) ITA	Zanetti	2	0	1+1	0		
	MF	(Italy) ITA	Vigiani	1	0	1	0		
	MF	(Italy) ITA	Campolo	9	1	0+6	0	3	1
	MF	(Italy) ITA	Cimarelli	2	0	0+2	0		
	MF	(Italy) ITA	Binchi	1	0	0	0	1	0
	DF	(Italy) ITA	Gola	0	0	0	0		
	DF	(Italy) ITA	Innocenti	0	0	0	0		
	GK	(Italy) ITA	Zandona	0	0	0	0		
	DF	(Italy) ITA	Carobbi						

- Source: http://calcio-seriea.net/presenze/1994/1074/
