= 1992–93 AC Fiorentina season =

Fiorentina
1992–93 season
- President: Mario Cecchi Gori
- Manager: Luigi Radice (until 4 January 1993); Aldo Agroppi (until 26 April 1993); Luciano Chiarugi; Giancarlo Antognoni
- Stadium: Stadio Artemio Franchi
- Serie A: 16th (relegated)
- Coppa Italia: Round of 16
- Top goalscorer: League: Gabriel Batistuta (16); All: Gabriel Batistuta (19)
Home colours	Away colours

Associazione Calcio Fiorentina had a poor season, finishing 16th in Serie A and being relegated to Serie B as a result. The highlight of the season was a crushing 7–3 defeat suffered at home to eventual champions Milan. The season would also see four different managers at the helm.

== Players ==
Note: Flags indicate national team as defined under FIFA eligibility rules; some limited exceptions apply. Players may hold more than one non-FIFA nationality.

Pos.	Nation	Player
GK	ITA	Gianmatteo Mareggini
GK	ITA	Alessandro Mannini
GK	ITA	Emiliano Betti
GK	ITA	Alessio Luci
DF	ITA	Stefano Carobbi
DF	ITA	Stefano Pioli
DF	ITA	Daniele Carnasciali
DF	ITA	Gianluca Luppi
DF	ITA	Mario Faccenda
DF	ITA	Antonio Dell'Oglio
DF	ITA	Lorenzo D'Anna
DF	ITA	Alberto Malusci
MF	ITA	Fabrizio Di Mauro
MF	ITA	Giuseppe Iachini
MF	ITA	Rufo Emiliano Verga

Pos.	Nation	Player
MF	GER	Stefan Effenberg
MF	ITA	Massimo Orlando
MF	ITA	Andrea Vascotto
MF	ARG	Diego Latorre
MF	BRA	Mazinho
MF	ITA	Mario Bartolelli
MF	ITA	Stefano Salvatori
MF	ITA	Stefano Lacchi
MF	ITA	Massimiliano Fiondella
MF	ITA	Stefano Salvatori
FW	DEN	Brian Laudrup
FW	ARG	Gabriel Batistuta
FW	ITA	Francesco Baiano
FW	ITA	Daniele Beltrammi
FW	ITA	Daniele Gilardi

=== Transfers ===
In
Pos.	Name	from	Type
FW	Brian Laudrup	Bayern München	
MF	Stefan Effenberg	Bayern München	
FW	Francesco Baiano	Foggia	
MF	Diego Latorre	Boca Juniors	
MF	Fabrizio Di Mauro	AS Roma	
DF	Gianluca Luppi	Juventus	
DF	Daniele Carnasciali	Brescia	

Out
Pos.	Name	To	Type
MF	Mazinho	Palmeiras	
FW	Stefano Borgonovo	Pescara	
MF	Dunga	Pescara	
MF	Stefano Salvatori	SPAL	
FW	Giacomo Banchelli	Alessandria	loan
FW	Marco Branca	Udinese	
DF	Vincenzo Matrone	Barletta	

==== Winter ====
In
Pos.	Name	from	Type

Out
Pos.	Name	To	Type
MF	Diego Latorre	CD Tenerife	loan
MF	Pietro Maiellaro	Venezia FC	loan
DF	Rufo Emiliano Verga	Venezia FC	loan

== Competitions ==
=== Serie A ===
==== League table ====
Pos	Team	Pld	W	D	L	GF	GA	GD	Pts	Qualification or relegation
14	Udinese	34	10	10	14	42	48	−6	30	Relegation tie-breaker
15	Brescia (Note: Brescia lost Relegation tie-breaker 1–3 vs.Udinese on 12 June 1993 then relegated to 1993-94 Serie B.) (R)	34	9	12	13	36	44	−8	30	Serie B after tie-breaker
16	Fiorentina (R)	34	8	14	12	53	56	−3	30 (Note: Fiorentina relegated for head-to-head points (Brescia 5; Udinese 4; Fiorentina 3).)	Relegation to Serie B
17	Ancona (R)	34	6	7	21	39	73	−34	19	Relegation to Serie B
18	Pescara (R)	34	6	5	23	47	75	−28	17	Relegation to Serie B

Source: 1992–93 Serie A, RSSSF.com
Rules for classification: 1) Points; 2) Head-to-head points; 3) Head-to-head goal difference; 4) Goal difference; 5) Goals scored; 6) Draw.(Note:
(R) Relegated

==== Results by round ====
Round	1	2	3	4	5	6	7	8	9	10	11	12	13	14	15	16	17	18	19	20	21	22	23	24	25	26	27	28	29	30	31	32	33	34
Ground	A	H	A	H	H	A	H	A	H	A	H	A	A	H	A	H	A	H	A	H	A	A	H	A	H	A	H	A	H	H	A	H	A	H
Result	D	D	W	D	L	W	W	L	W	D	L	W	D	L	L	D	L	D	L	L	D	L	W	L	W	D	D	D	L	D	L	D	D	W
Position	6	6	4	3	8	5	3	6	5	6	6	3	2	6	9	8	10	10	11	13	13	14	12	14	12	13	13	13	13	13	14	14	15	16

Source: Competitive matches
A = Away; H = Home; W = Win; D = Draw; L = Loss; = Leader, 1993–94 UEFA Champions League; = 1993–94 UEFA Cup; = 1993–94 Serie B

==== Matches ====
6 September 1992 1	Fiorentina	1–1	Genoa	Florence
	Effenberg 52'	Report	Van't Schip 66'	Stadium: Stadio Artemio Franchi; Referee: Walter Cinciripini

13 September 1992 2	Lazio	2–2	Fiorentina	Rome
	Signori 21' (pen.); Doll 34'	Report	Batistuta 9', 67'	Stadium: Stadio Olimpico; Referee: Fabio Baldas

20 September 1992 3	Fiorentina	7–1	Ancona	Florence
	Scanio 20' (o.g.); Di Mauro 34', 65'; Laudrup 39', 71'; Baiano 50'; Luppi 75'	Report	Détári 15'	Stadium: Stadio Artemio Franchi; Referee: Pasquale Rodomonti

27 September 1992 4	Internazionale	2–2	Fiorentina	Milan
	Shalimov 80'; Battistini 87'	Report	Batistuta 51', 84'	Stadium: San Siro; Referee: Pierluigi Pairetto

4 October 1992 5	Fiorentina	3–7	Milan	Florence
	Baiano 14'; Effenberg 48'; Di Mauro 89'	Report	Massaro 25', 45'; Lentini 34'; Gullit 42', 87'; Van Basten 79', 90'	Stadium: Stadio Artemio Franchi; Referee: Gianni Beschin

18 October 1992 6	Pescara	0–2	Fiorentina	Pescara
		Report	Beltrammi 13'; Baiano 83' (pen.)	Stadium: Stadio Adriatico; Referee: Arcangelo Pezzella

25 October 1992 7	Fiorentina	4–0	Sampdoria	Florence
	Baiano 1', 78' (pen.); Batistuta 63', 83'	Report		Stadium: Stadio Artemio Franchi; Referee: Maurizio Mughetti

1 November 1992 8	Cagliari	2–1	Fiorentina	Cagliari
	Francescoli 39'; Oliveira 90'	Report	Batistuta 57'	Stadium: Stadio Sant'Elia; Referee: Roberto Bettin

8 November 1992 9	Fiorentina	2–1	Roma	Florence
	Iachini 30'; Orlando 33'	Report	Caniggia 70'	Stadium: Stadio Artemio Franchi; Referee: Angelo Amendolia

22 November 1992 10	Brescia	1–1	Fiorentina	Brescia
	Hagi 47'	Report	Orlando 62'	Stadium: Stadio Mario Rigamonti; Referee: Liberto Brignoccoli

29 November 1992 11	Napoli	4–1	Fiorentina	Naples
	Policano 18'; Zola 42', 85'; Careca 90'	Report	Di Mauro 34'	Stadium: Stadio San Paolo; Referee: Mauro Felicani

6 December 1992 12	Fiorentina	2–0	Juventus	Florence
	Laudrup 8'; Sartor 53' (o.g.)	Report		Stadium: Stadio Artemio Franchi; Referee: Gianni Beschin

13 December 1992 13	Parma	1–1	Fiorentina	Parma
	Grün 59'	Report	Baiano 54'	Stadium: Stadio Ennio Tardini; Referee: Carlo Sguizzato

3 January 1993 14	Fiorentina	0–1	Atalanta	Florence
		Report	Perrone 53'	Stadium: Stadio Artemio Franchi; Referee: Loris Stafoggia

10 January 1993 15	Udinese	4–0	Fiorentina	Udine
	Branca 1', 45', 60'; Balbo 88'	Report		Stadium: Stadio Friuli; Referee: Arcangelo Pezzella

17 January 1993 16	Fiorentina	0–0	Torino	Florence
		Report		Stadium: Stadio Artemio Franchi; Referee: Virginio Quartuccio

24 January 1993 17	Foggia	1–0	Fiorentina	Foggia
	Kolyvanov 54'	Report		Stadium: Stadio Pino Zaccheria; Referee: Marcello Cardona

31 January 1993 18	Genoa	2–2	Fiorentina	Genoa
	Skuhravý 53', 77' (pen.)	Report	Baiano 26'; Batistuta 41'	Stadium: Stadio Luigi Ferraris; Referee: Angelo Amendolia

7 February 1993 19	Fiorentina	0–2	Lazio	Florence
		Report	Signori 59'; Fuser 90'	Stadium: Stadio Artemio Franchi; Referee: Graziano Cesari

14 February 1993 20	Ancona	2–1	Fiorentina	Ancona
	Agostini 45', 67' (pen.)	Report	Baiano 65'	Stadium: Stadio del Conero; Referee: Maurizio Mughetti

28 February 1993 21	Fiorentina	2–2	Internazionale	Florence
	Batistuta 7'; Paganin 90' (o.g.)	Report	Sosa 13', 70'	Stadium: Stadio Artemio Franchi; Referee: Fabio Baldas

7 March 1993 22	Milan	2–0	Fiorentina	Milan
	Savićević 66', 88'	Report		Stadium: San Siro; Referee: Alfredo Trentalange

14 March 1993 23	Fiorentina	2–0	Pescara	Florence
	Effenberg 47'; Batistuta 54'	Report		Stadium: Stadio Artemio Franchi; Referee: Liberto Brignoccoli

21 March 1993 24	Sampdoria	2–0	Fiorentina	Genoa
	Baiano 44' (o.g.); Pioli 90' (o.g.)	Report		Stadium: Stadio Luigi Ferraris; Referee: Pierluigi Pairetto

28 March 1993 25	Fiorentina	2–1	Cagliari	Florence
	Batistuta 65'; Di Mauro 67'	Report	Cappioli 11'	Stadium: Stadio Artemio Franchi; Referee: Loris Stafoggia

4 April 1993 26	Roma	1–1	Fiorentina	Rome
	Rizzitelli 6'	Report	Laudrup 12'	Stadium: Stadio Olimpico; Referee: Livio Bazzoli

10 April 1993 27	Fiorentina	2–2	Brescia	Florence
	Laudrup 37'; Batistuta 53'	Report	Di Mauro 69' (o.g.); Răducioiu 71'	Stadium: Stadio Artemio Franchi; Referee: Carlo Sguizzato

18 April 1993 28	Fiorentina	1–1	Napoli	Florence
	Batistuta 86'	Report	Fonseca 25'	Stadium: Stadio Artemio Franchi; Referee: Alfredo Trentalange

25 April 1993 29	Juventus	3–0	Fiorentina	Turin
	Marocchi 60'; Ravanelli 80'; R. Baggio 90' (pen.)	Report		Stadium: Stadio delle Alpi; Referee: Robert Anthony Boggi

8 May 1993 30	Fiorentina	1–1	Parma	Florence
	Di Mauro 89'	Report	Melli 43'	Stadium: Stadio Artemio Franchi; Referee: Pierluigi Pairetto

16 May 1993 31	Atalanta	2–1	Fiorentina	Bergamo
	Pisani 30'; Batistuta 87' (o.g.)	Report	Faccenda 85'	Stadium: Stadio Atleti Azzurri d'Italia; Referee: Angelo Amendolia

23 May 1993 32	Fiorentina	2–2	Udinese	Florence
	Effenberg 40' (pen.), 60'	Report	Dell'Anno 16'; Branca 28'	Stadium: Stadio Artemio Franchi; Referee: Alfredo Trentalange

30 May 1993 33	Torino	1–1	Fiorentina	Turin
	Carlos Aguilera 18'	Report	Batistuta 90'	Stadium: Stadio delle Alpi; Referee: Fabio Baldas

6 June 1993 34	Fiorentina	6–2	Foggia	Florence
	Batistuta 8', 30'; Baiano 26', 43'; Orlando 70'; Vascotto 79'	Report	Di Biagio 80'; Petrescu 85'	Stadium: Stadio Artemio Franchi; Referee: Robert Anthony Boggi

=== Coppa Italia ===
Second round

26 August 1992	Fiorentina	1–0	Perugia	Florence
				Stadium: Stadio Artemio Franchi

2 September 1992	Perugia	1–3	Fiorentina	Perugia
				Stadium: Renato Curi

Round of 16

7 October 1992	Roma	4–2	Fiorentina	Rome
	Carnevale 14', 52'; Mihajlović 46', 50'		Effenberg 79', 82' (pen.)	Stadium: Stadio Olimpico; Referee: Alfredo Trentalange

28 October 1992	Fiorentina	1–1 (3–5 agg.)	Roma	Florence
	Batistuta 84'		Rizzitelli 69'	Stadium: Stadio Artemio Franchi; Referee: Pierluigi Pairetto

== Statistics ==
=== Players statistics ===
No.	Pos	Nat	Player	Total		1992–93 Serie A		1992–93 Coppa Italia	
No.	Pos	Nat	Player	Apps	Goals	Apps	Goals	Apps	Goals
	GK	(Italy) ITA	Gianmatteo Mareggini	22	-29	21	-28	1	-1
	DF	(Italy) ITA	Stefano Carobbi	27	0	23+1	0	3	0
	DF	(Italy) ITA	Stefano Pioli	34	0	31	0	3	0
	DF	(Italy) ITA	Daniele Carnasciali	35	0	31	0	4	0
	DF	(Italy) ITA	Gianluca Luppi	32	1	28	1	4	0
	MF	(Germany) GER	Stefan Effenberg	34	7	30	5	4	2
	MF	(Italy) ITA	Fabrizio Di Mauro	33	6	29	6	4	0
	MF	(Italy) ITA	Massimo Orlando	32	3	28+1	3	3	0
	FW	(Denmark) DEN	Brian Laudrup	34	6	31	5	3	1
	FW	(Argentina) ARG	Gabriel Batistuta	35	19	32	16	3	3
	FW	(Italy) ITA	Francesco Baiano	36	11	32	10	4	1
	GK	(Italy) ITA	Alessandro Mannini	18	-33	13+2	-28	3	-5
	DF	(Italy) ITA	Mario Faccenda	26	1	21+2	1	3	0
	MF	(Italy) ITA	Giuseppe Iachini	24	1	14+7	1	3	0
	DF	(Italy) ITA	Antonio Dell'Oglio	12	0	5+7	0		
	FW	(Italy) ITA	Daniele Beltrammi	9	1	2+5	1	2	0
	DF	(Italy) ITA	Lorenzo D'Anna	5	0	2+3	0		
	MF	(Italy) ITA	Rufo Emiliano Verga	4	0	1+3	0		
	MF	(Italy) ITA	Andrea Vascotto	5	1	0+5	1		
	MF	(Argentina) ARG	Diego Latorre	2	0	0+2	0		
	GK	(Italy) ITA	Emiliano Betti	1	0	0+1	0		
	FW	(Italy) ITA	Daniele Gilardi	1	0	0+1	0		
	MF	(Brazil) BRA	Mazinho	1	0	0	0	1	0
	MF	(Italy) ITA	Mario Bartolelli	1	0	0	0	1	0
	MF	(Italy) ITA	Stefano Salvatori	1	0	0	0	1	0
	MF	(Italy) ITA	Stefano Lacchi	0	0	0	0		
	MF	(Italy) ITA	Massimiliano Fiondella	0	0	0	0		
	GK	(Italy) ITA	Alessio Luci	0	0	0	0		
	DF	(Italy) ITA	Alberto Malusci	0	0	0	0		
	MF	(Italy) ITA	Stefano Salvatori	0	0	0	0		

- Source: http://calcio-seriea.net/presenze/1992/1038/
