= 1995–96 AC Fiorentina season =

Fiorentina
1995–96 season
- President: Vittorio Cecchi Gori
- Manager: Claudio Ranieri
- Stadium: Stadio Artemio Franchi
- Serie A: 4th
- Coppa Italia: Winners
- Top goalscorer: League: Gabriel Batistuta (19); All: Gabriel Batistuta (27)
Home colours	Away colours	Third colours

Associazione Calcio Fiorentina had its best season for a long time, finishing tied for third in Serie A, plus winning the Coppa Italia following a clear double victory over Atalanta in the final. Strengthened by Stefan Schwarz and Michele Serena, Fiorentina were able to concede fewer goals than previously, but even though Rui Costa and Gabriel Batistuta continued their special partnership, the goals did not come with such ease as the year before.

== Players ==
Note: Flags indicate national team as defined under FIFA eligibility rules; some limited exceptions apply. Players may hold more than one non-FIFA nationality.

No.	Pos.	Nation	Player
1	GK	ITA	Francesco Toldo
2	DF	ITA	Daniele Carnasciali
3	DF	ITA	Michele Serena
4	MF	ITA	Giovanni Piacentini
5	DF	ITA	Lorenzo Amoruso
6	DF	ITA	Alberto Malusci
7	MF	SWE	Stefan Schwarz
8	FW	ITA	Francesco Baiano
9	FW	ARG	Gabriel Batistuta
10	MF	POR	Rui Costa
11	MF	ITA	Massimo Orlando
12	GK	ITA	Alessandro Zandonà
14	MF	ITA	Sandro Cois

No.	Pos.	Nation	Player
15	MF	ITA	Federico Bettoni
16	MF	ITA	Nicola Binchi
17	MF	ITA	Emiliano Bigica
18	FW	ITA	Giacomo Banchelli
19	DF	ITA	Pasquale Padalino
20	DF	ITA	Andrea Sottil
21	FW	ITA	Francesco Flachi
22	GK	ITA	Gianmatteo Mareggini
23	FW	ITA	Anselmo Robbiati
25	MF	ITA	Cristiano Zanetti
26	DF	ITA	Alessandro Orlando
—	MF	ITA	Christian Amoroso

=== Transfers ===
In
Pos.	Name	from	Type
MF	Stefan Schwarz	Arsenal F.C.	
DF	Michele Serena	Sampdoria	
DF	Lorenzo Amoruso	A.S. Bari	
DF	Alessandro Orlando	Juventus	
DF	Pasquale Padalino	Foggia Calcio	
MF	Mirko Benin	Varese	
MF	Federico Bettoni	Lodigiani	
MF	Emiliano Bigica	A.S. Bari	
MF	Giovanni Piacentini	A.S. Roma	
GK	Gianmatteo Mareggini	Palermo F.C.	loan ended
MF	Stefan Effenberg	Borussia Mönchengladbach	loan ended
MF	Massimo Orlando	A.C. Milan	loan ended
FW	Giacomo Banchelli	Udinese Calcio	loan ended
FW	Daniele Beltrammi	Lodigiani	loan ended

Out
Pos.	Name	To	Type
DF	Márcio Santos	AFC Ajax	
MF	Stefan Effenberg	Borussia Mönchengladbach	
FW	Angelo Carbone	A.C. Milan	loan ended
DF	Gianluca Luppi	Atalanta B.C.	
DF	Stefano Pioli	Padova Calcio	
MF	Daniele Amerini	Vicenza Calcio	
MF	Christian Cimarelli	Prato	
MF	Fabrizio Di Mauro	A.C. Reggiana	
MF	Giovanni Tedesco	Foggia Calcio	
GK	Cristiano Scalabrelli	Lucchese	loan
DF	Duccio Innocenti	Pontedera	loan
FW	Sergio Campolo	Pistoiese	loan
FW	Daniele Beltrammi	Montevarchi	loan

== Competitions ==
=== Serie A ===
==== League table ====
Pos	Team	Pld	W	D	L	GF	GA	GD	Pts	Qualification or relegation
2	Juventus	34	19	8	7	58	35	+23	65 (Note: Juventus qualified to 1996–97 UEFA Champions League as title holders.)	Qualified to Champions League
3	Lazio	34	17	8	9	66	38	+28	59	Qualification to UEFA Cup
4	Fiorentina	34	17	8	9	53	41	+12	59	Qualification to Cup Winners' Cup
5	Roma	34	16	10	8	51	34	+17	58 (Note: ROM 1-1 PAR; PAR 1-1 ROM Roma is ahead due to Goal difference.)	Qualification to UEFA Cup
6	Parma	34	16	10	8	44	31	+13	58	Qualification to UEFA Cup

Source: 1995–96 Serie A, RSSSF.com, Soccerway
Rules for classification: 1) Points; 2) Head-to-head points; 3) Head-to-head goal difference; 4) Goal difference; 5) Goals scored; 6) Draw. (Note: Head-to-head record is used only after all the matches between the teams in question have been played).

==== Results summary ====
Overall								Home						Away					
Pld	W	D	L	GF	GA	GD	Pts	W	D	L	GF	GA	GD	W	D	L	GF	GA	GD
34	17	8	9	53	41	+12	59	11	4	2	36	21	+15	6	4	7	17	20	−3

Last updated: 25 July 2015.
Source: Competitive matches

==== Results by round ====
Round	1	2	3	4	5	6	7	8	9	10	11	12	13	14	15	16	17	18	19	20	21	22	23	24	25	26	27	28	29	30	31	32	33	34
Ground	H	A	H	A	H	A	A	H	H	A	H	A	H	A	H	A	H	A	H	A	H	A	H	H	A	A	H	A	H	A	H	A	H	A
Result	W	L	W	L	W	W	L	W	W	L	D	W	W	W	D	D	W	W	D	D	W	D	W	D	D	L	L	W	W	L	W	L	L	W
Position	1	7	5	7	5	3	6	4	3	4	3	3	3	2	2	2	2	2	2	2	2	2	2	2	2	3	3	3	3	3	3	3	4	4

Source: Competitive matches
A = Away; H = Home; W = Win; D = Draw; L = Loss; = Leader, 1996–97 UEFA Champions League Group stage; = 1996–97 UEFA Cup First round

==== Matches ====
27 August 1995 1	Fiorentina	2–0	Torino	Florence
	Banchelli 56', 60'	Report		Stadium: Stadio Artemio Franchi; Referee: Robert Anthony Boggi

10 September 1995 2	Vicenza	1–0	Fiorentina	Vicenza
	Rossi 67'	Report		Stadium: Stadio Romeo Menti; Referee: Fiorenzo Treossi

17 September 1995 3	Fiorentina	3–1	Cagliari	Florence
	Baiano 2', 15'; Amoruso 20'	Report	Amoruso 17' (o.g.)	Stadium: Stadio Artemio Franchi; Referee: Gianni Beschin

24 September 1995 4	Parma	3–0	Fiorentina	Parma
	Stoichkov 35'; Crippa 41'; Benarrivo 64'	Report		Stadium: Stadio Ennio Tardini; Referee: Salvatore Racalbuto

1 October 1995 5	Fiorentina	3–2	Cremonese	Florence
	Padalino 40'; Baiano 44'; Batistuta 60'	Report	Maspero 41'; Fantini 89'	Stadium: Stadio Artemio Franchi; Referee: Emilio Pellegrino

15 October 1995 6	Napoli	0–2	Fiorentina	Naples
		Report	Tarantino 78' (o.g.); Orlando 86'	Stadium: Stadio San Paolo; Referee: Roberto Bettin

22 October 1995 7	Sampdoria	2–1	Fiorentina	Genoa
	Maniero 21'; Salsano 71'	Report	Rui Costa 57' (pen.)	Stadium: Stadio Luigi Ferraris; Referee: Cosimo Bolognino

29 October 1995 8	Fiorentina	3–2	Bari	Florence
	Robbiati 43'; Rui Costa 71'; Batistuta 86'	Report	Annoni 79'; Protti 90'	Stadium: Stadio Artemio Franchi; Referee: Marcello Cardona

5 November 1995 9	Fiorentina	2–0	Lazio	Florence
	Batistuta 46', 80'	Report		Stadium: Stadio Artemio Franchi; Referee: Pierluigi Pairetto

19 November 1995 10	Juventus	1–0	Fiorentina	Turin
	Del Piero 11'	Report		Stadium: Stadio delle Alpi; Referee: Livio Bazzoli

26 November 1995 11	Fiorentina	1–1	Internazionale	Florence
	Batistuta 66'	Report	Ganz 17'	Stadium: Stadio Artemio Franchi; Referee: Alfredo Trentalange

3 December 1995 12	Padova	0–1	Fiorentina	Padua
		Report	Batistuta 90'	Stadium: Stadio Euganeo; Referee: Domenico Messina

10 December 1995 13	Fiorentina	3–0	Udinese	Florence
	Baiano 17'; Batistuta 61' (pen.), 90'	Report		Stadium: Stadio Artemio Franchi; Referee: Angelo Bonfrisco

17 December 1995 14	Atalanta	1–3	Fiorentina	Bergamo
	Morfeo 71'	Report	Baiano 39'; Batistuta 60', 73'	Stadium: Stadio Atleti Azzurri d'Italia; Referee: Stefano Farina

23 December 1995 15	Fiorentina	2–2	Milan	Florence
	Robbiati 13'; Baiano 74'	Report	Weah 12'; R. Baggio 54' (pen.)	Stadium: Stadio Artemio Franchi; Referee: Pierluigi Pairetto

7 January 1996 16	Roma	2–2	Fiorentina	Rome
	Balbo 5', 49'	Report	Robbiati 60'; Batistuta 70'	Stadium: Stadio Olimpico; Referee: Robert Anthony Boggi

14 January 1996 17	Fiorentina	2–1	Piacenza	Florence
	Robbiati 28'; Baiano 38'	Report	Turrini 35'	Stadium: Stadio Artemio Franchi; Referee: Massimo De Santis

21 January 1996 18	Torino	0–3	Fiorentina	Turin
		Report	Batistuta 58', 90'; Baiano 69'	Stadium: Stadio delle Alpi; Referee: Pasquale Rodomonti

28 January 1996 19	Fiorentina	1–1	Vicenza	Florence
	Batistuta 7'	Report	Di Carlo 46'	Stadium: Stadio Artemio Franchi; Referee: Gennaro Borriello

4 February 1996 20	Cagliari	0–0	Fiorentina	Cagliari
		Report		Stadium: Stadio Sant'Elia; Referee: Graziano Cesari

11 February 1996 21	Fiorentina	1–0	Parma	Florence
	Amoruso 25'	Report		Stadium: Stadio Artemio Franchi; Referee: Domenico Messina

18 February 1996 22	Cremonese	0–0	Fiorentina	Cremona
		Report		Stadium: Stadio Giovanni Zini; Referee: Pierluigi Collina

25 February 1996 23	Fiorentina	3–0	Napoli	Florence
	Batistuta 36', 76'; Robbiati 79'	Report		Stadium: Stadio Artemio Franchi; Referee: Livio Bazzoli

3 March 1996 24	Fiorentina	2–2	Sampdoria	Florence
	Rui Costa 48'; Robbiati 76'	Report	Mancini 22'; Karembeu 45'	Stadium: Stadio Artemio Franchi; Referee: Fiorenzo Treossi

10 March 1996 25	Bari	1–1	Fiorentina	Bari
	Andersson 41'	Report	Baiano 86' (pen.)	Stadium: Stadio San Nicola; Referee: Pasquale Rodomonti

10 April 1996 26	Lazio	4–0	Fiorentina	Rome
	Winter 14'; Signori 32', 51'; Casiraghi 83'	Report		Stadium: Stadio Olimpico; Referee: Emilio Pellegrino

24 March 1996 27	Fiorentina	0–1	Juventus	Florence
		Report	Amoruso 28' (o.g.)	Stadium: Stadio Artemio Franchi; Referee: Graziano Cesari

31 March 1996 28	Internazionale	1–2	Fiorentina	Milan
	Centofanti 10'	Report	Cois 26'; Padalino 32'	Stadium: San Siro; Referee: Alfredo Trentalange

6 April 1996 29	Fiorentina	6–4	Padova	Florence
	Baiano 4'; Robbiati 40'; Batistuta 49', 80' (pen.); Banchelli 59'; Rosa 64' (o.g.)	Report	Amoruso 56', 85'; Vlaović 61', 62'	Stadium: Stadio Artemio Franchi; Referee: Daniele Tombolini

14 April 1996 30	Udinese	1–0	Fiorentina	Udine
	Poggi 8'	Report		Stadium: Stadio Friuli; Referee: Graziano Cesari

20 April 1996 31	Fiorentina	1–0	Atalanta	Florence
	Banchelli 17'	Report		Stadium: Stadio Artemio Franchi; Referee: Pasquale Rodomonti

28 April 1996 32	Milan	3–1	Fiorentina	Milan
	Savićević 14'; R. Baggio 45' (pen.); Simone 76'	Report	Rui Costa 13'	Stadium: San Siro; Referee: Walter Cinciripini

5 May 1996 33	Fiorentina	1–4	Roma	Florence
	Batistuta 9'	Report	Balbo 19' (pen.), 34' (pen.); Delvecchio 27', 90'	Stadium: Stadio Artemio Franchi; Referee: Emilio Pellegrino

12 May 1996 34	Piacenza	0–1	Fiorentina	Piacenza
		Report	Corini 21' (o.g.)	Stadium: Stadio Galleana; Referee: Livio Bazzoli

=== Coppa Italia ===
==== Second round ====
30 August 1995	Ascoli	1–2	Fiorentina	Ascoli Piceno
	Minuti 55'		Serena 59'; Savio 70' (o.g.)	Stadium: Stadio Cino e Lillo Del Duca; Referee: Roberto Bettin

==== Eightfinals ====
25 October 1995	Lecce	0–5	Fiorentina	Lecce
			Rui Costa 3'; Batistuta 39'; Baiano 54', 72'; Robbiati 88'	Stadium: Stadio Via del Mare; Referee: Robert Boggi

==== Quarterfinals ====
30 November 1995	Fiorentina	1–0	Palermo F.C.	Florence
	Batistuta 64' (pen.)			Stadium: Stadio Artemio Franchi; Attendance: 24 000; Referee: Loris Stafoggia

13 December 1995	Palermo F.C.	1–2	Fiorentina	Palermo
	Scarafoni 72' (pen.)		Baiano 33'; Rui Costa 57'	Stadium: Stadio La Favorita; Attendance: 33 000; Referee: Gianni Beschin

==== Semifinals ====
15 February 1996	Fiorentina	3–1	Internazionale	Florence
	Batistuta 14' (pen.); Batistuta 48'; Batistuta 86'		32' Ganz	Stadium: Stadio Artemio Franchi; Attendance: 27,645; Referee: Gianni Beschin

28 February 1996	Internazionale	0–1	Fiorentina	Milan
			Batistuta 78'	Stadium: San Siro; Attendance: 53,737; Referee: Graziano Cesari

==== Final ====
2 May 1996	Fiorentina	1–0	Atalanta	Florence
21:00	Batistuta 52'			Stadium: Stadio Artemio Franchi; Referee: Robert Boggi

18 May 1996	Atalanta	0–2	Fiorentina	Bergamo
21:00			L. Amoruso 48'; Batistuta 61'	Stadium: Stadio Atleti Azzurri d'Italia; Referee: Pierluigi Pairetto

== Statistics ==
=== Players statistics ===
No.	Pos	Nat	Player	Total		Serie A		Coppa	
No.	Pos	Nat	Player	Apps	Goals	Apps	Goals	Apps	Goals
1	GK	(Italy) ITA	Toldo	42	-44	34	-41	8	-3
2	DF	(Italy) ITA	Carnasciali	37	0	31	0	6	0
19	DF	(Italy) ITA	Padalino	37	2	30	2	7	0
5	DF	(Italy) ITA	Amoruso	39	3	31	2	8	1
3	DF	(Italy) ITA	Serena	30	1	24	0	6	1
7	MF	(Sweden) SWE	Schwarz	38	0	32	0	6	0
4	MF	(Italy) ITA	Piacentini	34	0	27+2	0	5	0
17	MF	(Italy) ITA	Bigica	33	0	22+5	0	6	0
10	MF	(Portugal) POR	Rui Costa	41	6	33+1	4	7	2
8	FW	(Italy) ITA	Baiano	33	14	27+1	11	5	3
9	FW	(Argentina) ARG	Batistuta	39	27	31	19	8	8
22	GK	(Italy) ITA	Mareggini	1	0	0	0	1	-0
14	MF	(Italy) ITA	Cois	27	1	16+8	1	3	0
23	FW	(Italy) ITA	Robbiati	39	7	11+21	6	7	1
20	DF	(Italy) ITA	Sottil	21	0	7+9	0	5	0
18	FW	(Italy) ITA	Banchelli	19	4	5+11	4	3	0
6	DF	(Italy) ITA	Malusci	13	0	5+5	0	3	0
26	DF	(Italy) ITA	Orlando	8	0	4+3	0	1	0
11	MF	(Italy) ITA	Orlando M	13	1	2+7	1	4	0
15	MF	(Italy) ITA	Bettoni	15	0	1+10	0	4	0
21	FW	(Italy) ITA	Flachi	5	0	1+2	0	2	0
25	MF	(Italy) ITA	Zanetti	4	0	0+2	0	2	0
16	MF	(Italy) ITA	Binchi	0	0	0	0		
12	GK	(Italy) ITA	Zandona						
	MF	(Italy) ITA	Amoroso						

- Source: http://calcio-seriea.net/presenze/1995/1092/
