= 1991–92 AC Fiorentina season =

Fiorentina
1991–92 season
- President: Mario Cecchi Gori
- Manager: Sebastião Lazaroni (until 30 September 1991); Luigi Radice
- Stadium: Artemio Franchi
- Serie A: 12th
- Coppa Italia: Round of 16
- Top goalscorer: League: Gabriel Batistuta (13); All: Gabriel Batistuta (14)
Home colours	Away colours	Third colours

Associazione Calcio Fiorentina failed to take off under former Brazil national team coach Sebastião Lazaroni, and ended the season in 12th place. The result prompted president Cecchi Gori to sign German star Stefan Effenberg among others for the coming season, also replacing Lazaroni with Luigi Radice. The most significant event in Fiorentina's season was the arrival of Argentine striker Gabriel Batistuta, who was to become Fiorentina's all-time top scorer during his nine years at the club.

== Squad ==
Note: Flags indicate national team as defined under FIFA eligibility rules; some limited exceptions apply. Players may hold more than one non-FIFA nationality.

Pos.	Nation	Player
GK	ITA	Gianmatteo Mareggini
GK	ITA	Alessandro Mannini
DF	ITA	Mario Faccenda
DF	ITA	Alberto Malusci
DF	ITA	Vittorio Tosto
DF	ITA	Stefano Pioli
DF	ITA	Vincenzo Matrone
DF	ITA	Stefano Carobbi
MF	ITA	Antonio Dell'Oglio
MF	ITA	Daniele Amerini
MF	ITA	Giuseppe Iachini
MF	ITA	Damiano Moscardi

Pos.	Nation	Player
MF	BRA	Mazinho
MF	ITA	Massimo Orlando
MF	ITA	Stefano Salvatori
MF	ITA	Massimiliano Fiondella
MF	BRA	Dunga
FW	ARG	Gabriel Batistuta
FW	ITA	Stefano Borgonovo
FW	ITA	Giacomo Banchelli
FW	ITA	Marco Branca
FW	ITA	Fabio Graccaneli
FW	ITA	Daniele Gilardi
FW	ITA	Pietro Maiellaro
FW	ITA	Massimiliano Memmo

=== Transfers ===
In
Pos.	Name	from	Type
FW	Gabriel Batistuta	Boca Juniors	
MF	Mazinho	US Lecce	
FW	Marco Branca	UC Sampdoria	
FW	Pietro Maiellaro	AS Bari	
DF	Stefano Carobbi	AC Milan	
MF	Daniele Amerini	Sestese	
DF	Vittorio Tosto	Caratese	
GK	Alessandro Mannini	Delfino Pescara	

Out
Pos.	Name	To	Type
MF	Renato Buso	UC Sampdoria	
DF	Alberto Di Chiara	Parma	
MF	Diego Fuser	AC Milan	
MF	Luboš Kubík	FC Metz	
FW	Marius Lacatus	Real Oviedo	
GK	Marco Landucci	Lucchese	
FW	Marco Nappi	Genoa CFC	loan ended
DF	Celeste Pin	Hellas Verona	
DF	Giuseppe Volpecina	Casertana	
MF	Alessandro Antinori		released

== Competitions ==
=== Serie A ===
==== League table ====
Pos	Team	Pld	W	D	L	GF	GA	GD	Pts
10	Lazio	34	11	12	11	43	40	+3	34
11	Atalanta	34	10	14	10	31	33	−2	34
12	Fiorentina	34	10	12	12	44	41	+3	32
13	Cagliari	34	7	15	12	30	34	−4	29
14	Genoa	34	9	11	14	35	47	−12	29

Source: 1991–92 Serie A, RSSSF.com
Rules for classification: 1) Points; 2) Head-to-head points; 3) Head-to-head goal difference; 4) Goal difference; 5) Goals scored; 6) Draw.

==== Results by round ====
Round	1	2	3	4	5	6	7	8	9	10	11	12	13	14	15	16	17	18	19	20	21	22	23	24	25	26	27	28	29	30	31	32	33	34
Ground	A	H	A	H	H	A	H	A	A	H	A	H	A	H	A	H	A	H	A	H	A	A	H	A	H	H	A	H	A	H	A	H	A	H
Result	L	W	L	D	L	D	W	D	W	L	D	W	W	L	L	L	D	W	L	D	D	W	D	L	L	L	W	D	D	W	D	L	W	D
Position	13	7	12	12	13	13	13	12	10	11	12	12	7	11	12	13	13	12	13	13	13	12	12	12	12	13	13	13	13	13	12	12	12	12

Source: http://calcio-seriea.net/allenatori_squadra/1991/1021/
A = Away; H = Home; W = Win; D = Draw; L = Loss; = 1992–93 European Cup; = 1992–93 UEFA Cup

==== Matches ====
1 September 1991 1	Juventus	1–0	Fiorentina	Turin
	Casiraghi 42'	Report		Stadium: Stadio delle Alpi; Referee: Angelo Amendolia

8 September 1991 2	Fiorentina	3–1	Genoa	Florence
	Faccenda 10'; Batistuta 45'; Maiellaro 90'	Report	Carlos Aguilera 54' (pen.)	Stadium: Stadio Artemio Franchi; Referee: Paolo Fabricatore

15 September 1991 3	Fiorentina	1–2	Foggia	Florence
	Faccenda 27'	Report	Petrescu 62'; Codispoti 65'	Stadium: Stadio Artemio Franchi; Referee: Gianni Beschin

22 September 1991 4	Milan	1–1	Fiorentina	Milan
	Van Basten 86' (pen.)	Report	Maiellaro 62'	Stadium: San Siro; Referee: Pierluigi Pairetto

29 September 1991 5	Fiorentina	0–1	Roma	Florence
		Report	Salsano 36'	Stadium: Stadio Artemio Franchi; Referee: Fabio Baldas

6 October 1991 6	Internazionale	1–1	Fiorentina	Milan
	Desideri 48'	Report	Fiondella 70'	Stadium: San Siro; Referee: Graziano Cesari

20 October 1991 7	Fiorentina	2–0	Bari	Florence
	Dunga 16'; Orlando 90'	Report		Stadium: Stadio Artemio Franchi; Referee: Rosario Lo Bello

27 October 1991 8	Ascoli	0–0	Fiorentina	Ascoli Piceno
		Report		Stadium: Stadio Cino e Lillo Del Duca; Referee: Paolo Fabricatore

3 November 1991 9	Fiorentina	1–0	Cagliari	Florence
	Dell'Oglio 63'	Report		Stadium: Stadio Artemio Franchi; Referee: Dario Boemo

17 November 1991 10	Atalanta	1–0	Fiorentina	Bergamo
	Caniggia 42'	Report		Stadium: Stadio Atleti Azzurri d'Italia; Referee: Werter Cornieti

24 November 1991 11	Fiorentina	1–1	Lazio	Florence
	Orlando 27'	Report	Sosa 71' (pen.)	Stadium: Stadio Artemio Franchi; Referee: Carlo Sguizzato

1 December 1991 12	Cremonese	1–3	Fiorentina	Cremona
	Verdelli 69'	Report	Malusci 46'; Batistuta 59'; Giandebiaggi 90' (o.g.)	Stadium: Stadio Giovanni Zini; Referee: Maurizio Mughetti

8 December 1991 13	Fiorentina	4–1	Hellas Verona	Florence
	Carobbi 13'; Batistuta 15'; Dunga 80'; Matrone 88'	Report	Lunini 90'	Stadium: Stadio Artemio Franchi; Referee: Vincenzo Fucci

15 December 1991 14	Torino	2–0	Fiorentina	Turin
	Lentini 30'; Scifo 58'	Report		Stadium: Stadio delle Alpi; Referee: Rosario Lo Bello

5 January 1992 15	Fiorentina	1–2	Sampdoria	Florence
	Pari 77' (o.g.)	Report	Vierchowod 39'; Vialli 71'	Stadium: Stadio Artemio Franchi; Referee: Mauro Felicani

12 January 1992 16	Napoli	1–0	Fiorentina	Naples
	Crippa 51'	Report		Stadium: Stadio San Paolo; Referee: Loris Stafoggia

19 January 1992 17	Fiorentina	1–1	Parma	Florence
	Apolloni 1' (o.g.)	Report	Grün 49'	Stadium: Stadio Artemio Franchi; Referee: Tullio Lanese

26 January 1992 18	Fiorentina	2–0	Juventus	Florence
	Batistuta 7'; Branca 90'	Report		Stadium: Stadio Artemio Franchi; Referee: Arcangelo Pezzella

2 February 1992 19	Genoa	3–2	Fiorentina	Genoa
	Skuhravý 8', 18'; Caricola 59'	Report	Batistuta 1', 80'	Stadium: Stadio Luigi Ferraris; Referee: Alfredo Trentalange

9 February 1992 20	Foggia	3–3	Fiorentina	Foggia
	Rambaudi 29'; Baiano 31'; Shalimov 37'	Report	Batistuta 24', 52', 76'	Stadium: Stadio Pino Zaccheria; Referee: Livio Bazzoli

16 February 1992 21	Fiorentina	0–0	Milan	Florence
		Report		Stadium: Stadio Artemio Franchi; Referee: Graziano Cesari

23 February 1992 22	Roma	1–3	Fiorentina	Rome
	Völler 79'	Report	Batistuta 36', 70'; Dunga 90'	Stadium: Stadio Olimpico; Referee: Maurizio Mughetti

1 March 1992 23	Fiorentina	1–1	Internazionale	Florence
	Iachini 57'	Report	Fontolan 29'	Stadium: Stadio Artemio Franchi; Referee: Vincenzo Fucci

8 March 1992 24	Bari	1–0	Fiorentina	Bari
	Fortunato 15'	Report		Stadium: Stadio San Nicola; Referee: Arcangelo Pezzella

15 March 1992 25	Fiorentina	1–2	Ascoli	Florence
	Maiellaro 62'	Report	Troglio 21'; D'Ainzara 35'	Stadium: Stadio Artemio Franchi; Referee: Robert Anthony Boggi

29 March 1992 26	Cagliari	4–0	Fiorentina	Cagliari
	Napoli 55'; Francescoli 67'; Fonseca 74', 90'	Report		Stadium: Stadio Sant'Elia; Referee: Graziano Cesari

5 April 1992 27	Fiorentina	3–0	Atalanta	Florence
	Orlando 34'; Batistuta 44', 89'	Report		Stadium: Stadio Artemio Franchi; Referee: Gianni Beschin

12 April 1992 28	Lazio	1–1	Fiorentina	Rome
	Stroppa 55'	Report	Branca 90'	Stadium: Stadio Olimpico; Referee: Walter Cinciripini

18 April 1992 29	Fiorentina	1–1	Cremonese	Florence
	Malusci 79'	Report	Iacobelli 39'	Stadium: Stadio Artemio Franchi; Referee: Roberto Bettin

26 April 1992 30	Hellas Verona	2–3	Fiorentina	Verona
	Lunini 49'; Fanna 82' (pen.)	Report	Branca 16', 56', 74'	Stadium: Stadio Marc'Antonio Bentegodi; Referee: Robert Anthony Boggi

3 May 1992 31	Fiorentina	0–0	Torino	Florence
		Report		Stadium: Stadio Artemio Franchi; Referee: Liberto Brignoccoli

10 May 1992 32	Sampdoria	2–0	Fiorentina	Genoa
	Buso 41'; Pari 58'	Report		Stadium: Stadio Luigi Ferraris; Referee: Carlo Sguizzato

17 May 1992 33	Fiorentina	4–2	Napoli	Florence
	Borgonovo 29', 39', 77'; Dunga 58'	Report	Blanc 37'; De Napoli 50'	Stadium: Stadio Artemio Franchi; Referee: Maurizio Mughetti

24 May 1992 34	Parma	1–1	Fiorentina	Parma
	Brolin 89' (pen.)	Report	Maiellaro 43'	Stadium: Stadio Ennio Tardini; Referee: Massimo Chiesa

=== Coppa Italia ===
Second round

28 August 1991 1st leg	Fiorentina	2–1	Cesena	Fiorentina
20:30 CEST (UTC+01:00)	Borgonovo 12'; Dunga 25'		Amarildo 53'	Stadium: Artemio Franchi

4 September 1991 2nd leg	Cesena	1–3 (2–5 agg.)	Fiorentina	Florence
16:00 CEST (UTC+01:00)	Amarildo 53'		7' Orlando 49' (o.g.)Piraccini; 84'Batistuta	Stadium: Stadio Comunale; Referee: Tullio Lanese

Round of 16

29 October 1991 1st leg	Parma	0–0	Fiorentina	Parma
20:30 CEST (UTC+01:00)				Stadium: Stadio Ennio Tardini; Attendance: 9,000; Referee: Carlo Sguizzato

4 December 1991 2nd leg	Fiorentina	1–1 (1–1a agg.)	Parma	Florence
16:00 CEST (UTC+01:00)	Borgonovo 33'		Brolin 63'	Stadium: Stadio Comunale; Referee: Tullio Lanese

== Statistics ==
=== Players statistics ===
No.	Pos	Nat	Player	Total		1991–92 Serie A		1991–92 Coppa Italia	
No.	Pos	Nat	Player	Apps	Goals	Apps	Goals	Apps	Goals
	GK	(Italy) ITA	Gianmatteo Mareggini	28	-33	28	-33		
	DF	(Italy) ITA	Stefano Carobbi	33	1	33	1		
	DF	(Italy) ITA	Mario Faccenda	34	2	34	2		
	DF	(Italy) ITA	Alberto Malusci	26	2	23+3	2		
	DF	(Italy) ITA	Stefano Pioli	30	0	30	0		
	MF	(Italy) ITA	Stefano Salvatori	27	0	27	0		
	MF	(Italy) ITA	Giuseppe Iachini	26	1	19+7	1		
	MF	(Brazil) BRA	Dunga	33	4	33	4		
	MF	(Italy) ITA	Massimo Orlando	28	3	27+1	3		
	FW	(Argentina) ARG	Gabriel Batistuta	27	13	26+1	13		
	FW	(Italy) ITA	Pietro Maiellaro	25	4	19+6	4		
	GK	(Italy) ITA	Alessandro Mannini	7	-8	6+1	-8		
	MF	(Brazil) BRA	Mazinho	21	0	18+3	0		
	MF	(Italy) ITA	Antonio Dell'Oglio	22	1	16+6	1		
	FW	(Italy) ITA	Marco Branca	23	5	13+10	5		
	DF	(Italy) ITA	Massimiliano Fiondella	17	1	13+4	1		
	FW	(Italy) ITA	Stefano Borgonovo	14	3	8+6	3		
	DF	(Italy) ITA	Vincenzo Matrone	3	1	1+2	1		
	FW	(Italy) ITA	Beltrammi	2	0	0+2	0		
	FW	(Italy) ITA	Daniele Gilardi	1	0	0+1	0		
	FW	(Italy) ITA	Giacomo Banchelli	1	0	0+1	0		
	FW	(Italy) ITA	Bartolelli	1	0	0+1	0		
	MF	(Italy) ITA	Aiana	1	0	0+1	0		
	GK	(Italy) ITA	Betti	0	0	0	0		
	DF	(Italy) ITA	Bucaro	0	0	0	0		
	MF	(Italy) ITA	Antonaccio	0	0	0	0		
