= Francesco Toldo =

Italian footballer (born 1971)

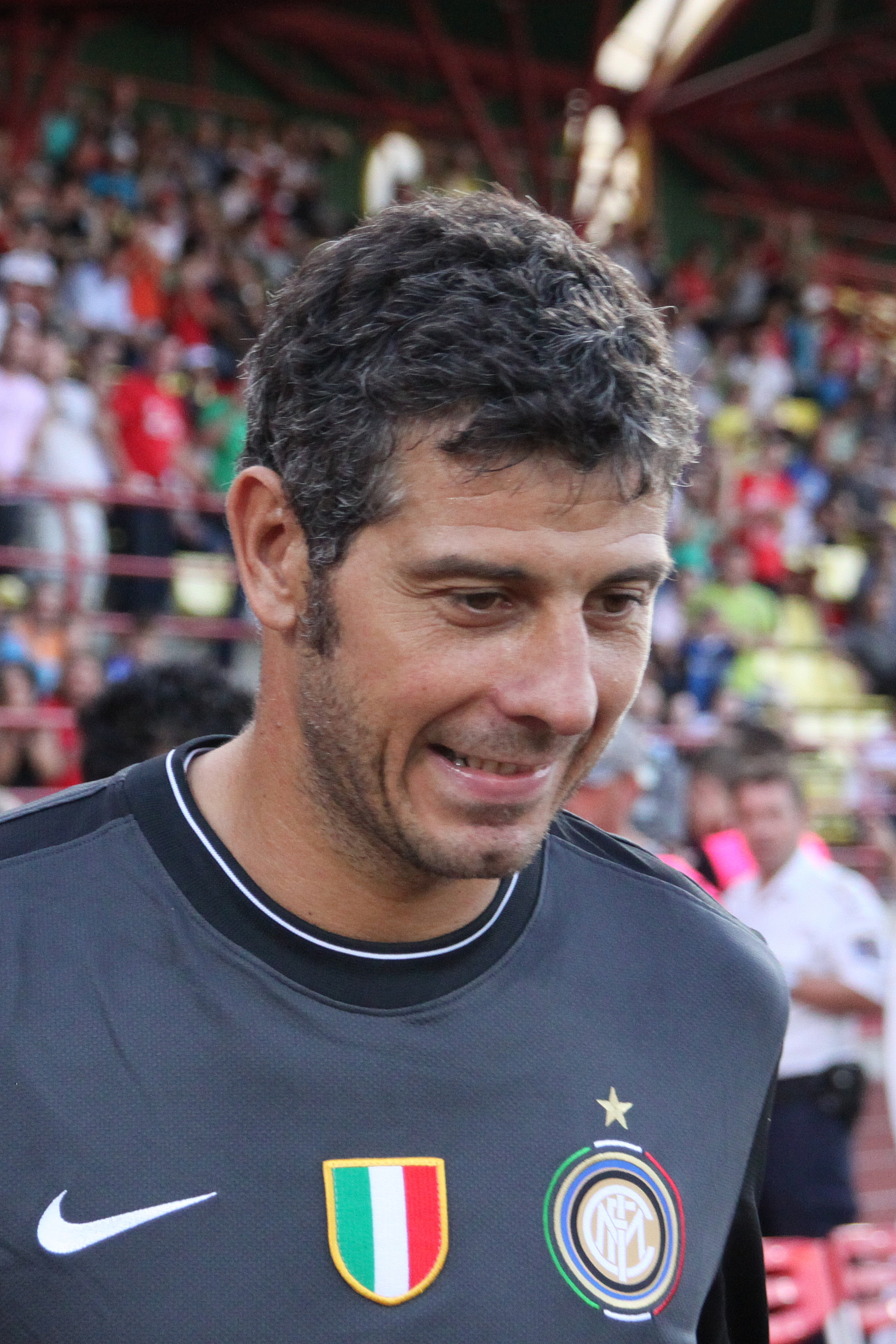
- Toldo with Inter Milan in 2009

Personal information
- Full name: Francesco Toldo
- Date of birth: 2 December 1971 (age 54)
- Place of birth: Padua, Italy
- Height: 1.96 m (6 ft 5 in)
- Position: Goalkeeper

Youth career
- 1983–1985: USMA Caselle
- 1985–1987: Montebelluna
- 1987–1990: Milan

Senior career*
| Years | Team | Apps | (Gls) |
| 1990–1993 | Milan | 0 | (0) |
| 1990–1991 | → Hellas Verona (loan) | 0 | (0) |
| 1991–1992 | → Trento (loan) | 38 | (0) |
| 1992–1993 | → Ravenna (loan) | 31 | (0) |
| 1993–2001 | Fiorentina | 266 | (0) |
| 2001–2010 | Inter Milan | 148 | (0) |
| Total | | 483 | (0) |

International career
| 1993–1994 | Italy U21 | 8 | (0) |
| 1995–2004 | Italy | 28 | (0) |
Medal record
Men's football
Representing Italy
UEFA European Under-21 Championship
| Winner | 1994 France |
UEFA European Championship
| Runner-up | 2000 Belgium–Netherlands |
- * Club domestic league appearances and goals

Francesco Toldo Cavaliere OMRI (Italian pronunciation: [franˈtʃesko ˈtɔldo]; born 2 December 1971) is an Italian former footballer who played as a goalkeeper. He is regarded by some pundits as one of the greatest goalkeepers of his generation.

In a professional career which spanned two full decades, he mainly represented Fiorentina and Inter Milan (eight and nine seasons respectively), winning a total of 15 trophies combined.

For the Italy national team, Toldo took part in five international competitions, being a starter in UEFA Euro 2000, where he helped Italy reach the final.

== Club career ==
=== Early career and Fiorentina ===
Born in Padua, Veneto, Toldo began his career with Milan in 1990. He never played a game for Milan, however, being loaned during his stint with the club, successively to Hellas Verona (1990–91), Trento (1991–92), and Ravenna (1992–93).

Toldo then joined Fiorentina in 1993, and became the Viola club's starter for eight seasons, helping the club win the Serie B title in his first season, and earn promotion to Serie A, later also winning the Coppa Italia twice, the Supercoppa Italiana, and playing in one edition of the UEFA Champions League, as well as reaching the semi-finals of the 1996–97 UEFA Cup Winners' Cup. In 2000, Toldo was named the Serie A Goalkeeper of the Year for his performances.

One year before Fiorentina faced bankruptcy, Toldo and Rui Costa were sold to Parma for a combined 140 billion lire in June 2001 (55 billion lire for Toldo; about €28.4 million in fixed exchange rate). It made the club a net profit in 2000–01 financial year, instead of a net loss. However, both players refused to join. Toldo himself he would be the replacement of departing goalkeeper Gianluigi Buffon, whom Toldo refused to live under the expectation of. Eventually, Toldo joined Inter Milan instead of Parma for the same fee; Parma signed Sébastien Frey from Inter instead of Toldo; Buffon joined Juventus from Parma; and Edwin van der Sar went to Fulham from Juventus.

=== Inter Milan ===
During his first season with the Inter under manager Héctor Cúper, Toldo performed at a high level, reaching the semi-final of the UEFA Cup, and narrowly missing out on the Serie A title on the final match-day as Inter threw away their lead by losing to Lazio, eventually finishing the 2001–02 Serie A season in third place behind Juventus and Roma. Due to his consistency with Inter, Toldo soon became a fan favourite and was noted for his passionate and high-quality performances. The following season, he was praised particularly for his saves against Valencia in the Champions League quarter-final, leading football pundits to nickname the Mestalla "La Plaza de Toldo". During the match, Toldo was seen getting choked by teammate Luigi Di Biagio after an argument on the pitch. With his performances, Toldo helped Inter reach the semi-finals of the Champions League that season, losing out to the eventual champions and inter-city rivals Milan on away goals. Another great memory for Inter fans was his contribution to the equalising goal, scored by Christian Vieri, in the last minute of an eventual 1–1 draw against title rivals Juventus in the 2002–03 season; at first it appeared that Toldo might have been the scorer instead of Vieri, and even today the goal is still often referred to as "Toldo's goal".

During the 2004–05 season, Toldo helped Inter win the Coppa Italia, and he also reached the quarter-finals of the Champions League, losing out to Milan once again, who went on to reach the final. He followed up this victory with another Supercoppa Italiana title in 2005. Toldo was the number one keeper for Inter until the summer of 2005, when the Brazilian Júlio César relegated him to the bench after he had elected to sit out Inter's summer friendly match tour of England.

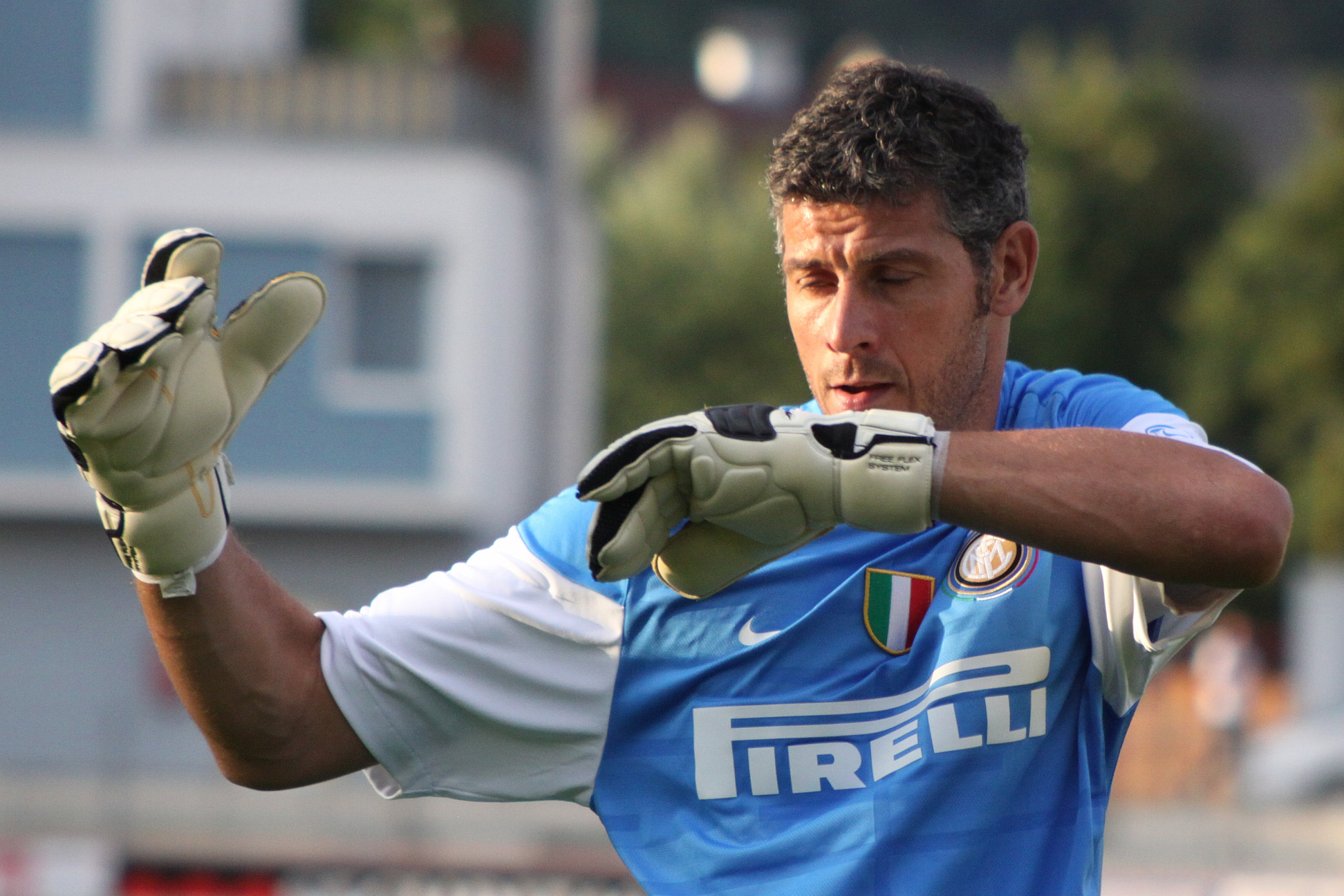
Toldo practicing with Inter Milan

Toldo briefly regained first-choice status in February 2006, following his signing of a contract extension (until June 2009) and a slip in form by Júlio César, not before rumours linked him both to Palermo, Milan and Fiorentina. Toldo still contributed nine appearances for Inter in Serie A during the 2005–06 season, where Inter were awarded the title following Juventus's and Milan's involvement in the 2006 Calciopoli scandal, also helping Inter to win another Coppa Italia, as well as the 2006 Supercoppa Italiana. He also made six Serie A appearances for Inter during the 2006–07 title-winning season. Toldo made eight appearances across all competitions during the 2007–08 season, three of which were in Serie A, and the other five coming in the Coppa Italia, where Inter reached the final. Inter won the Scudetto that season for the third successive time.

In April 2009, the 37-year-old Toldo, still backing up Júlio César, signed a further two-year extension to his link, taking it to the summer of 2011. Toldo made seven appearances across all competitions during the 2008–09 season, making three appearances in Serie A, three in the Coppa Italia, and one in the Champions League as Inter won their fourth consecutive Serie A title that year.

In June 2010, it was reported that Toldo would retire from football after winning a Serie A, Coppa Italia and Champions League treble during the 2009–10 season, since the club had also signed a new backup goalkeeper, Luca Castellazzi. It was formally announced on 7 July via Inter Channel, the official club channel.

== International career ==
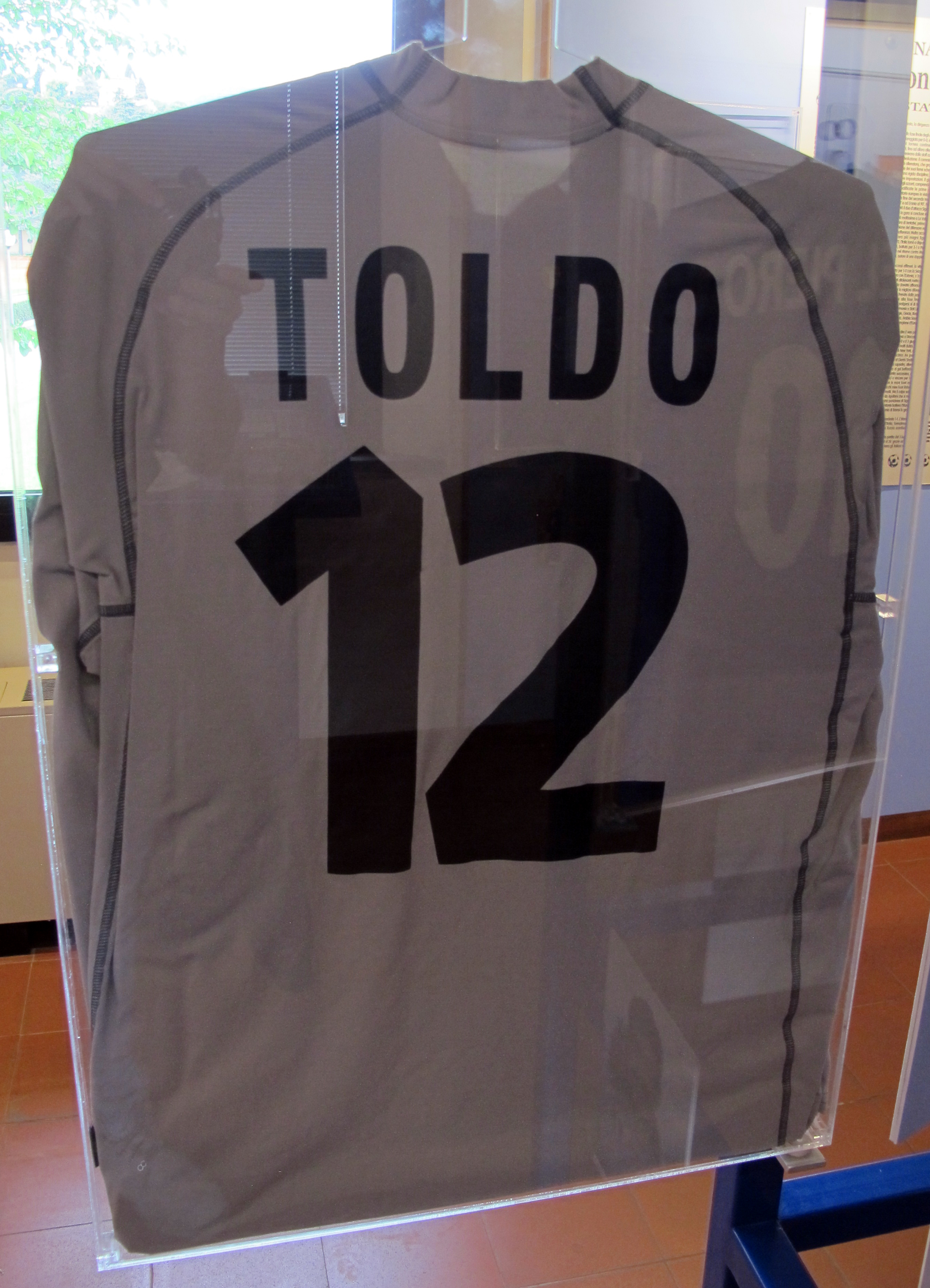
Toldo's Euro 2000 Italy jersey located in the Football Museum in Florence

At under-21 level, Toldo made eight appearances for Italy between 1993 and 1994; he was notably a member of the side that won the 1994 UEFA European Under-21 Championship, making a crucial save in the semi-final shoot-out against hosts France.

Toldo was capped 28 times for Italy. His debut came on 8 October 1995, replacing Gianfranco Zola after the ejection of Luca Bucci in a 1–1 draw in Croatia for the UEFA Euro 1996 qualifiers. He was picked up for the finals in England as a reserve behind Angelo Peruzzi.

Despite facing competition from high-profile goalkeepers such as Gianluca Pagliuca, Angelo Peruzzi, Christian Abbiati, Luca Marchegiani, Francesco Antonioli and in particular Gianluigi Buffon, Toldo was chosen by manager Dino Zoff to start in Euro 2000 as Buffon broke his hand in a friendly match against Norway just eight days before the tournament started.

He helped his country to a runner-up finish at Euro 2000, keeping three clean sheets, contributing to the elimination of both host nations (Belgium and the Netherlands) in the process. During the semi-final against hosts Netherlands, he saved one penalty in regulation time, and stopped two more in the successful shootout; he was named man of the match for his performance. In the final, Italy lost 2–1 to the reigning world champions France after a David Trezeguet golden goal in the 103rd minute; Italy had been leading 1–0, but Sylvain Wiltord equalised in the final minute of stoppage time to send the match into extra time. Toldo was named to the Team of the Tournament for his performances, also earning the third place in the IFFHS World's Best Goalkeeper Award. Following his successful European Championship campaign, Toldo played as a starter at the beginning of the 2002 FIFA World Cup qualifying campaign; however, after recovering from the aforementioned injury, Buffon was eventually confirmed by Giovanni Trapattoni as Italy's first-choice goalkeeper.

Additionally, Toldo was an unused reserve in Italy's 1998 World Cup, 2002 World Cup, and Euro 2004 squads; in 1998, he was initially left off of Italy's World Cup team by manager Cesare Maldini, with Peruzzi, Pagliuca, and Buffon being called up, but an injury to Peruzzi saw him called up as a last-minute replacement. After Euro 2004, Toldo announced his retirement from international football. His final appearance for Italy came on 18 February 2004, in a 2–2 friendly draw against Czech Republic at the Stadio Renzo Barbera in Palermo.

== Style of play ==
After playing in several outfield positions during his youth career, Toldo was inspired to become a goalkeeper by his role model Dino Zoff. He also cited Giovanni Galli as an influence. A consistent and agile goalkeeper, with strong reactions, he was also competent with the ball at his feet. Although in his youth he did not particularly enjoy facing penalties, he later made a name for himself as a penalty-saving specialist throughout his career; he also stood out for his composure, personality and mentality in goal. In spite of his large stature, and his strong and imposing physique, he was an excellent shot-stopper, who was known for his ability to get to ground quickly and easily to parry low shots; however, unusually for a goalkeeper of his height, he was less effective at coming off his line to handle crosses and high balls.

== Career statistics ==
=== Club ===
Appearances and goals by club, season and competition
| Club | Season | League | | | Coppa Italia | | Europe | | Other | | Total | |
| Club | Season | Division | Apps | Goals | Apps | Goals | Apps | Goals | Apps | Goals | Apps | Goals |
|---|---|---|---|---|---|---|---|---|---|---|---|---|
| Hellas Verona | 1990–91 | Serie B | 0 | 0 | 0 | 0 | — | | — | | 0 | 0 |
| Trento | 1991–92 | Serie C2 | 38 | 0 | 0 | 0 | — | | — | | 38 | 0 |
| Ravenna | 1992–93 | Serie C1 | 31 | 0 | 0 | 0 | — | | — | | 31 | 0 |
| Fiorentina | 1993–94 | Serie B | 33 | 0 | 5 | 0 | — | | — | | 38 | 0 |
| Fiorentina | 1994–95 | Serie A | 34 | 0 | 5 | 0 | — | | — | | 39 | 0 |
| Fiorentina | 1995–96 | Serie A | 34 | 0 | 8 | 0 | — | | — | | 42 | 0 |
| Fiorentina | 1996–97 | Serie A | 32 | 0 | 3 | 0 | 8 (Note: Appearances in UEFA Cup Winners' Cup) | 0 | 1 (Note: Appearance in Supercoppa Italiana) | 0 | 44 | 0 |
| Fiorentina | 1997–98 | Serie A | 34 | 0 | 3 | 0 | — | | — | | 37 | 0 |
| Fiorentina | 1998–99 | Serie A | 33 | 0 | 10 | 0 | 3 (Note: Appearances in UEFA Cup) | 0 | — | | 46 | 0 |
| Fiorentina | 1999–2000 | Serie A | 34 | 0 | 3 | 0 | 13 (Note: Appearances in UEFA Champions League) | 0 | — | | 50 | 0 |
| Fiorentina | 2000–01 | Serie A | 32 | 0 | 6 | 0 | 2 | 0 | — | | 40 | 0 |
| Fiorentina | Total | | 266 | 0 | 43 | 0 | 26 | 0 | 1 | 0 | 336 | 0 |
| Inter Milan | 2001–02 | Serie A | 33 | 0 | 1 | 0 | 9 | 0 | — | | 43 | 0 |
| Inter Milan | 2002–03 | Serie A | 32 | 0 (Note: Although the equalising goal against Juventus in the 2002–03 season is sometimes referred to as "Toldo's goal", it was Christian Vieri who scored it.) | 1 | 0 | 18 | 0 | — | | 51 | 0 |
| Inter Milan | 2003–04 | Serie A | 32 | 0 | 2 | 0 | 11 | 0 | — | | 45 | 0 |
| Inter Milan | 2004–05 | Serie A | 30 | 0 | 2 | 0 | 7 | 0 | — | | 39 | 0 |
| Inter Milan | 2005–06 | Serie A | 9 | 0 | 5 | 0 | 5 | 0 | 1 | 0 | 20 | 0 |
| Inter Milan | 2006–07 | Serie A | 6 | 0 | 9 | 0 | 2 | 0 | 1 | 0 | 18 | 0 |
| Inter Milan | 2007–08 | Serie A | 3 | 0 | 5 | 0 | 0 | 0 | 0 | 0 | 8 | 0 |
| Inter Milan | 2008–09 | Serie A | 3 | 0 | 3 | 0 | 1 | 0 | 0 | 0 | 7 | 0 |
| Inter Milan | 2009–10 | Serie A | 0 | 0 | 3 | 0 | 0 | 0 | 0 | 0 | 3 | 0 |
| Inter Milan | Total | | 148 | 0 | 31 | 0 | 53 | 0 | 2 | 0 | 234 | 0 |
| Career total | | | 483 | 0 | 74 | 0 | 79 | 0 | 3 | 0 | 639 | 0 |

=== International ===
Appearances and goals by national team and year
| National team | Year | Apps | Goals |
|---|---|---|---|
| Italy | 1995 | 1 | 0 |
| Italy | 1996 | 5 | 0 |
| Italy | 1997 | 0 | 0 |
| Italy | 1998 | 0 | 0 |
| Italy | 1999 | 0 | 0 |
| Italy | 2000 | 11 | 0 |
| Italy | 2001 | 2 | 0 |
| Italy | 2002 | 4 | 0 |
| Italy | 2003 | 4 | 0 |
| Italy | 2004 | 1 | 0 |
| Total | | 28 | 0 |

== Honours ==
Fiorentina

- Coppa Italia: 1995–96, 2000–01
- Supercoppa Italiana: 1996
- Serie B: 1993–94

Inter Milan

- Serie A: 2005–06, 2006–07, 2007–08, 2008–09, 2009–10
- Coppa Italia: 2004–05, 2005–06, 2009–10
- Supercoppa Italiana: 2005, 2006, 2008
- UEFA Champions League: 2009–10

Italy U21

- UEFA European Under-21 Championship: 1994

Italy

- UEFA European Championship runner-up: 2000

Individual

- Serie A Goalkeeper of the Year: 2000
- UEFA European Championship Team of the Tournament: 2000
- ESM Team of the Year: 2001–02
- ACF Fiorentina Hall of Fame: 2015
- Fiorentina All-time XI
- Inter Milan Hall of Fame: 2019

Orders

5th Class / Knight: Cavaliere Ordine al Merito della Repubblica Italiana: 2000
