= Sergio Campolo =

Italian footballer

Personal information
- Full name: Sergio Quinto Campolo
- Date of birth: 4 March 1972 (age 54)
- Place of birth: Reggio Calabria, Italy
- Height: 1.72 m (5 ft 8 in)
- Position: Midfielder

Youth career
- 1988–1992: Reggina

Senior career*
| Years | Team | Apps | (Gls) |
| 1991–1993 | Reggina | 27 | (0) |
| 1993–1995 | Fiorentina | 20 | (0) |
| 1995–1997 | Pistoiese | 48 | (2) |
| 1997 | Giulianova | 16 | (0) |
| 1998 | Ancona | 12 | (0) |
| 1998–2000 | Perugia | 23 | (0) |
| 2000–2001 | Catania | 7 | (0) |
| 2001–2004 | Messina | 79 | (4) |
| 2004–2005 | Catanzaro | 5 | (0) |
| Total | | 237 | (6) |

Managerial career
- 2008–2009: Omega Bagaladi
- 2010: Igea Virtus
- 2011: Messina
- 2015: Bocale
- 2020–2021: Viterbese (youth)
- * Club domestic league appearances and goals

Sergio Quinto Campolo (born 4 March 1972), is an Italian former professional footballer and manager, who played as a midfielder.

== Playing career ==
Revealed by Reggina in 1991, Campolo was part of the Serie B champion squad with Fiorentinain 1993–94. In the 1998–99 season, when he played for Perugia, he was suspended for two months for doping due to the use of cannabis. He played in the final part of his career for teams in southern Italy, such as Catania, Messina and Catanzaro.

== Managerial career ==
As a coach, Campolo managed the teams of Omega Bagaladi in the Seconda Categoria, Igea Virtus in the then Lega Pro Seconda Divisione, and Messina in Serie D. His last job was at Viterbese in the Dante Berretti championship.

== Honours ==
Fiorentina

- Serie B: 1993–94
