= Giuseppe Iachini =

Italian football manager (born 1964)

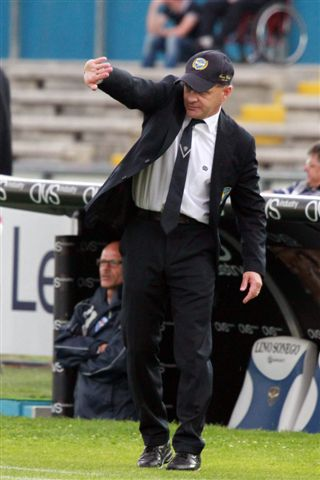
- Iachini in 2011

Personal information
- Full name: Giuseppe Iachini
- Date of birth: 7 May 1964 (age 62)
- Place of birth: Ascoli Piceno, Italy
- Height: 1.74 m (5 ft 9 in)
- Position: Midfielder

Youth career
- Ascoli

Senior career*
Years	Team	Apps	(Gls)
1981–1987	Ascoli	81	(9)
1987–1989	Verona	47	(1)
1989–1994	Fiorentina	126	(2)
1994–1996	Palermo	62	(1)
1996–1997	Ravenna	31	(1)
1997–2000	Venezia	65	(0)
2000–2001	Alessandria	14	(0)
Total		426	(14)

Managerial career
- 2001–2002: Venezia (Director of football)
- 2002–2003: Cesena
- 2003–2004: Vicenza
- 2004–2007: Piacenza
- 2007–2008: Chievo
- 2009–2010: Brescia
- 2011: Brescia
- 2011–2012: Sampdoria
- 2012–2013: Siena
- 2013–2015: Palermo
- 2016: Palermo
- 2016: Udinese
- 2017–2018: Sassuolo
- 2018–2019: Empoli
- 2019–2020: Fiorentina
- 2021: Fiorentina
- 2021–2022: Parma
- 2024: Bari
- * Club domestic league appearances and goals

Giuseppe 'Beppe' Iachini (Italian pronunciation: [dʒuˈzɛppe jaˈkiːni]; born 7 May 1964) is an Italian professional football manager and former player in the role of midfielder.

== Club career ==
Iachini was born in Ascoli Piceno. He started his playing career at Ascoli and made his Serie A and professional debut at the age of 17 during the 1981–82 season. He played for Ascoli until 1987, when he signed for Verona.

In 1989, Iachini left Verona, moved to Fiorentina, and played five seasons with the viola, four in Serie A. From 1994 to 1996, he played for Palermo of Serie B. After a single Serie B season with Ravenna, in 1997, Iachini transferred to Venezia, where he played for three years, two of them in Serie A. He retired in 2001, after a Serie C1 season with Alessandria.

As a player, he represented the Italy Olympic side at the 1988 Summer Olympics at international level, where they finished in fourth place.

== Managerial career ==
=== Venezia ===
Iachini started his coaching career in October 2001, when he was called to coach Venezia of Serie A, despite not having a coaching license yet. Assisted by "official" head coach Alfredo Magni, Iachini left his position as assistant coach at Piacenza to join Venezia, despite the Italian football regulation laws and was successively disqualified for six months because of that. Ultimately, Venezia were relegated to Serie B.

=== Cesena ===
In the 2002–03 season, Iachini coached Cesena of Serie C1, leading his team to a spot in the promotion playoffs.

=== Vicenza ===
In the 2003–04 season, Iachini moved to Vicenza, in Serie B, where he managed a team composed mostly of youngsters and led them to a mid-table place.

=== Piacenza ===
He coached Piacenza, another Serie B club, from 2004–05 to 2006–07 with good results, including a notable fourth place, only behind Juventus, Napoli and Genoa, in his latest season with the biancorossi.

=== Chievo Verona: promotion to Serie A ===
He was announced in June 2007 as the new Chievo Verona boss for their 2007–08 Serie B campaign and successfully led the Gialloblu to become league champions and promptly mark their return in the top flight.

On 4 November 2008, following an unimpressive start in the 2008–09 Serie A campaign, and two days after a 3–0 loss to Palermo, Iachini was dismissed from his coaching post by the club management.

=== Brescia: promotion to Serie A ===
On 4 October 2009, he was appointed new head coach of Serie B outfit Brescia, replacing Alberto Cavasin. Under his tenure, Brescia ended the regular season in third place, missing automatic promotion in the final game of the season. The team, however, went back to win the promotion playoffs and claim a place in the 2010–11 Serie A after defeating Torino in the finals.

After a wave of bad results, resulting in the team's dropdown to the relegation zone near the winter, on 6 December 2010, he was sacked; However, he was called back at the helm of Brescia boss less than two months later, following the dismissal of his successor Mario Beretta on 30 January 2011.

=== Sampdoria: promotion to Serie A ===
On 14 November 2011, Iachini was named as the new head coach of Sampdoria, after a disastrous start to the season in Serie B, in place of the sacked Gianluca Atzori. He charged the team, strongly depressed under the psychological profile and in winter market with radically revised to players motivated and adapted to the category. On 9 June 2012, the team, ranked only 6th in the league with an incredible recovery, was promoted after playoffs to Serie A, defeating Varese in the finals.

=== Siena ===
On 17 December 2012, Iachini was appointed the new coach of Siena in Serie A in place of the sacked Serse Cosmi. He left the club by the end of the season.

=== Palermo ===
On 25 September 2013, he was announced as the new head coach of Palermo, a former team of his as a player, signing a two-year contract and taking over from dismissed Gennaro Gattuso. During his tenure, he succeeded in turning the Sicilians' fortunes, eventually winning his fourth top-flight promotion, guiding Palermo to be crowned Serie B champions on May 3, five matches before the end of the season. He was successively confirmed as Palermo's head coach for the upcoming 2014–15 Serie A season. He was sacked on 10 November 2015.

Following a confusing period where Palermo owner Maurizio Zamparini appointed four different managers in a month after the sacking of Davide Ballardini, Iachini returned as manager of the club on 15 February 2016, but was sacked once again on 10 March.

=== Udinese ===
He was appointed manager of Udinese on 19 May 2016. He was sacked on 2 October 2016.

=== Sassuolo ===
On 27 November 2017, Iachini was named manager of Sassuolo following the sacking of Christian Bucchi. He left the club on 5 June 2018 by mutual consent.

=== Empoli ===
On 6 November 2018, he was appointed manager of Empoli, replacing Aurelio Andreazzoli, who was sacked the day before. He was sacked on 13 March 2019.

=== Fiorentina ===
On 23 December 2019, Iachini was unveiled as the new manager of Fiorentina, his former club as a player. He succeeded Vincenzo Montella. On 9 November 2020, Iachini was sacked.

On 24 March 2021, Iachini was rehired as Fiorentina manager after Cesare Prandelli resigned.

=== Parma ===
On 23 November 2021, Iachini returned into management as the new head coach of Serie B club Parma, replacing Enzo Maresca.

On 17 May 2022, after failing to ensure qualification to the promotion playoffs, despite being touted as title favourites before the start of the season, Parma announced their decision not to continue with Iachini as their manager.

=== Bari ===
On 6 February 2024, Iachini was hired by Serie B club Bari, signing a contract until 30 June 2025. He was however dismissed only two months later, on 15 April 2024, leaving Bari in the relegation zone.

== Managerial statistics ==
As of match played 13 April 2024

Managerial record by team and tenure
Team	Nat	From	To	Record							
Team	Nat	From	To	G	W	D	L	GF	GA	GD	Win %
Cesena	(Italy)	1 July 2002	3 June 2003	42	19	14	9	59	34	+25	45.24
Vicenza	(Italy)	1 July 2003	1 July 2004	47	12	21	14	49	52	−3	25.53
Piacenza	(Italy)	1 July 2004	15 June 2007	134	54	32	48	170	156	+14	40.30
Chievo	(Italy)	15 June 2007	3 November 2008	54	25	16	13	84	62	+22	46.30
Brescia	(Italy)	4 October 2009	6 December 2010	55	23	12	20	67	64	+3	41.82
Brescia	(Italy)	30 January 2011	29 June 2011	16	2	8	6	17	22	−5	12.50
Sampdoria	(Italy)	14 November 2011	2 July 2012	31	15	10	6	37	24	+13	48.39
Siena	(Italy)	17 December 2012	14 July 2013	22	5	5	12	21	34	−13	22.73
Palermo	(Italy)	25 September 2013	10 November 2015	88	40	25	23	121	96	+25	45.45
Palermo	(Italy)	15 February 2016	9 March 2016	3	0	1	2	1	8	−7	0.00
Udinese	(Italy)	19 May 2016	2 October 2016	8	2	1	5	8	15	−7	25.00
Sassuolo	(Italy)	27 November 2017	5 June 2018	26	9	8	9	24	38	−14	34.62
Empoli	(Italy)	6 November 2018	13 March 2019	16	4	4	8	24	33	−9	25.00
Fiorentina	(Italy)	23 December 2019	9 November 2020	31	12	10	9	45	36	+9	38.71
Fiorentina	(Italy)	24 March 2021	23 May 2021	10	2	5	3	12	14	−2	20.00
Parma	(Italy)	23 November 2021	17 May 2022	25	7	11	7	31	25	+6	28.00
Bari	(Italy)	6 February 2024	Present	10	2	2	6	9	14	−5	20.00
Total				618	233	185	200	779	727	+52	37.70

== Honours ==
=== Playing ===
Ascoli

- Serie B: 1985–86
- Mitropa Cup: 1986–87

Fiorentina

- Serie B: 1993–94

=== Managerial ===
ChievoVerona

- Serie B: 2007–08

Palermo

- Serie B: 2013–14

Individual

- Panchina d'Argento: 2007–08
