= Antonio Dell'Oglio =

Italian footballer (born 1963)

Personal information
- Date of birth: 19 June 1963 (age 63)
- Place of birth: Milan, Italy
- Height: 1.77 m (5 ft 10 in)
- Position: Midfielder

Senior career*
Years	Team	Apps	(Gls)
1981–1982	Pavia	35	(2)
1982–1983	Trento	15	(0)
1983–1989	Ascoli	137	(4)
1989–1993	Fiorentina	81	(3)
1993–1994	Monza	16	(0)
1994–1996	Juve Stabia	53	(3)
1996–1997	Turris	26	(2)
1997–1998	Ascoli	29	(0)
1998–1999	Turris	28	(1)
1999–2000	Taranto	30	(3)
2000–2001	Martina	31	(4)
2001–2002	Ostuni	32	(1)
2002–2003	Melfi	32	(3)
2003–2004	Bitonto	29	(2)
Total		574	(28)
- * Club domestic league appearances and goals

Antonio Dell'Oglio (born 19 June 1963) is an Italian former professional footballer who played as a midfielder.
