= Marco Branca =

Italian former footballer

Personal information
- Date of birth: 6 January 1965 (age 61)
- Place of birth: Grosseto, Italy
- Height: 1.84 m (6 ft 0 in)
- Position: Striker

Youth career
- 1981–1982: Grosseto
- 1982–1984: Cagliari

Senior career*
Years	Team	Apps	(Gls)
1984–1986	Cagliari	52	(4)
1986–1987	Udinese	18	(2)
1987–1988	Sampdoria	9	(1)
1988–1990	Udinese	55	(13)
1990–1991	Sampdoria	20	(5)
1991–1992	Fiorentina	23	(5)
1992–1994	Udinese	58	(22)
1994–1995	Parma	25	(7)
1995–1996	Roma	7	(2)
1996–1998	Inter Milan	52	(23)
1998–1999	Middlesbrough	12	(9)
1999–2000	Luzern	10	(2)
2000–2001	Monza	17	(7)
Total		348	(102)

International career
1996	Italy Olympic (O.P.)	3	(4)
- * Club domestic league appearances and goals

Marco Branca (born 6 January 1965) is an Italian former professional footballer who played as a striker and was, until February 2014, sporting director of Serie A club Inter Milan.

== Club career ==
=== Early career ===
Born in Grosseto, Branca started his playing career with Grosseto, the then-amateur local team of his native city, but was soon signed by Cagliari, where he made his professional debut. He then moved to Udinese, Sampdoria and then again to Udinese. Following another season with Sampdoria, he signed first for Fiorentina and then for Parma. In 1995, he transferred to Roma, who sold him in the 1996 winter transfer window to Inter Milan in exchange for Marco Delvecchio.

=== Inter Milan and Middlesbrough ===
In his first season with the Nerazzuri, Branca scored an impressive 17 goals in 24 matches, but did not repeat in his next campaign and was sold to English second-tier side Middlesbrough. Branca scored nine goals in 12 league games for Middlesbrough, including two on his league debut in a 3–1 victory against Sunderland, a hat-trick versus Bury and another two in the 6–0 win over Swindon Town. In addition, he played two League Cup games, scoring the second goal against Liverpool in the semi-final second leg on his debut. His nine goals aided in Boro's promotion to the Premiership, he was then injured and Middlesbrough claimed insurance on his value and he was released from his contract. He chased Middlesbrough through the courts, before signing for Swiss club FC Luzern. Branca made just one further appearance for Middlesbrough after the end of the 1997–98 season in a Premier League match against Tottenham Hotspur.

=== Later career ===
Branca saw out his playing days with FC Luzern and Italian lower-league club Monza before retiring in 2001.

== International career ==
Branca took part in the 1996 Summer Olympics as overage player.

== Managerial career ==
From 2002 until February 2014, Branca was part of Inter Milan's management, working in their transfer network. He helped organise the transfers of Lúcio, Diego Milito, Thiago Motta, Wesley Sneijder and Samuel Eto'o.

== Honours ==
Sampdoria

- Serie A: 1990–91

Parma

- UEFA Cup: 1994–95

Middlesbrough

- Football League Cup runner-up: 1997–98
