= Cristiano Zanetti =

Italian footballer (born 1977)

Personal information
- Date of birth: 10 April 1977 (age 49)
- Place of birth: Carrara, Italy
- Height: 1.80 m (5 ft 11 in)
- Position: Midfielder

Senior career*
Years	Team	Apps	(Gls)
1993–1996	Fiorentina	4	(0)
1996–1997	Venezia	21	(0)
1997–1998	Reggiana	31	(0)
1998–1999	Inter Milan	0	(0)
1998–1999	→ Cagliari (loan)	18	(0)
1999–2001	Roma	38	(0)
2001–2006	Inter Milan	99	(2)
2006–2009	Juventus	63	(4)
2009–2011	Fiorentina	29	(0)
2011–2012	Brescia	8	(0)
Total		311	(6)

International career
1995	Italy U-18	1	(0)
1998–2000	Italy U21	19	(1)
2001–2004	Italy	17	(1)

Managerial career
- 2013–2014: AC Pisa (youth)
- 2014–2015: Prato (youth)
- 2015–2016: Pietrasanta Calcio
- 2016–2017: Carrarese (youth)
- 2017–2018: Massese
- * Club domestic league appearances and goals

Cristiano Zanetti (Italian pronunciation: [kriˈstjaːno ddzaˈnetti]; born 10 April 1977) is an Italian former footballer who played as a midfielder and current football coach. He was most recently in charge of Massese.

Zanetti played for several Italian clubs throughout his career, winning titles with Fiorentina, Roma, Inter, and Juventus. At international level, he represented the Italy national football team at the 2000 Summer Olympics, at the 2002 FIFA World Cup and at UEFA Euro 2004.

== Club career ==
=== Early career ===
He played for Fiorentina (1993–96), Venezia (1996–97), and Reggiana (1997–98), before he joined the defending UEFA Cup Champions Inter Milan aged 21, in 1998, where he played alongside his unrelated namesake, Argentine fullback Javier Zanetti. Zanetti made his club debut for Internazionale on 26 August 1998 against Skonto before joining Cagliari along with Mohamed Kallon. During his time with Fiorentina, he won a Coppa Italia in 1996.

=== Roma ===
In the summer of 1999, he was signed by Roma in a joint-ownership bid for 7 billion Italian lire. Under manager Fabio Capello, he soon became a member of the starting line-up and he won a Scudetto with Roma during the 2000–01 season.

=== Inter Milan ===
In June 2001, Zanetti re-joined Inter Milan under manager Héctor Cúper; Inter paid 10 billion Italian lire to buy back Zanetti. He was a regular starter under Cuper, and with the club he managed to the reach of the semi-finals of the 2001–02 UEFA Cup and the 2002–03 UEFA Champions League, also narrowly missing out on the Serie A title both of those seasons. The 2003–04 season was more disappointing, however, and upon the arrival of new manager Roberto Mancini, he was deployed with less frequency due to injuries, as well as the arrivals of Edgar Davids and Esteban Cambiasso in midfield, although he was finally able to capture some silverware during his final two seasons at the club. During his second stint with Inter, he won two Coppa Italia trophies in 2005 and 2006, a Supercoppa Italiana in 2005, and he was also awarded a Serie A title after the Calciopoli scandal in 2006.

=== Juventus ===
Zanetti moved to Juventus in 2006 on a free transfer, despite the match-fixing controversy surrounding the Turin giants and their subsequent relegation. Zanetti was Luciano Moggi's final signing as the Juventus transfer director before his five-year ban due to his role in the Calciopoli scandal. Zanetti won the Serie B title with Le Zebre in 2007, earning Juventus Serie A promotion. The following season, he helped Juventus to a third place in Serie A, which allowed them to qualify for the UEFA Champions League in 2008. Juventus were eliminated in the round of 16 losing 3–2 on aggregate, and they reached the semi-finals of the Coppa Italia losing 4–2 on aggregate, also finishing second in Serie A with 74 points.

=== Fiorentina ===
Zanetti signed with his first professional club Fiorentina on 10 August 2009, as the club was preparing to play in 2009–10 UEFA Champions League play-off round. He signed a 2+1 contract. He is the second player to join La Viola from Juventus in 2009–10 season after Marco Marchionni. Zanetti was tagged for €2 million and deducted from Felipe Melo transfer fee. He made his debut for Fiorentina on 29 September 2009 against Liverpool in the group stage of the UEFA Champions League. His assist led to Fiorentina's first goal, scored by young Montenegrin Stevan Jovetić. Fiorentina eventually won the match 2–0.

=== Brescia ===
On 31 January 2011, Zanetti signed for Brescia on a two-year contract. He retired before the conclusion of the 2011–12 Serie B season, however, after cancelling his contract with the club.

== International career ==
Zanetti represented Italy at Under-21 level on 19 occasions, winning the 2000 UEFA European Under-21 Championship under manager Marco Tardelli; he also took part in the 2000 Summer Olympics in Sydney with Italy, where the team was eliminated in the quarter-finals. He subsequently played for the Italian senior national team at the 2002 FIFA World Cup and at UEFA Euro 2004. In total, he won 17 caps for the national side between 2001 and 2004, under Giovanni Trapattoni, and he scored one goal in a 2–1 friendly away win over Switzerland, on 30 April 2003.

== Style of play ==
Zanetti has been described as a hardworking and tough tackling defensive midfielder, with good vision, technique, passing ability, and a controlling influence on the midfield, and was known in particular for his ability to break down possession and subsequently start attacking plays, which also enabled him to be deployed as a central midfielder, or even as a deep-lying playmaker in front of the defence; he was also deployed as a left-sided offensive-minded central midfielder on occasion, known as the mezzala role in Italian football jargon. Despite his talents, he was often injury-prone throughout his career.

== Managerial career ==
In 2013, Zanetti accepted an offer to become a youth coach at Pisa, heading the Giovanissimi Nazionali (Under-16). In 2014, he became a coaching graduate and obtained a UEFA Pro Licence. In 2014 become youth coach at Prato.

== Career statistics ==
=== Club ===
Appearances and goals by club, season and competition
Club	Season	League			Cup		Europe		Total	
Club	Season	Division	Apps	Goals	Apps	Goals	Apps	Goals	Apps	Goals
Fiorentina	1994–95	Serie A	2	0	0	0	—		2	0
Fiorentina	1995–96	Serie A	2	0	1	0	—		3	0
Fiorentina	Total		4	0	1	0	—		5	0
Venezia (loan)	1996–97	Serie B	27	0	0	0	—		27	0
Reggiana (loan)	1997–98	Serie B	31	0	2	0	—		33	0
Inter Milan	1998–99	Serie A	0	0	1	0	1 (Note: Appearance(s) in UEFA Champions League)	0	2	0
Cagliari (loan)	1998–99	Serie A	18	0	0	0	—		18	0
Roma	1999–2000	Serie A	12	0	1	0	2 (Note: Appearance(s) in UEFA Cup)	0	15	0
Roma	2000–01	Serie A	27	0	0	0	3	0	30	0
Roma	Total		39	0	1	0	5	0	45	0
Inter Milan	2001–02	Serie A	26	1	1	0	6	1	33	2
Inter Milan	2002–03	Serie A	17	0	1	0	6	0	24	0
Inter Milan	2003–04	Serie A	19	1	0	0	10 (Note: Five appearances in UEFA Champions League, five appearances in UEFA Cup)	0	29	1
Inter Milan	2004–05	Serie A	23	0	5	0	7	0	35	0
Inter Milan	2005–06	Serie A	14	0	5	0	4	0	23	0
Inter Milan	Total		99	2	13	0	34	1	146	3
Juventus	2006–07	Serie B	25	2	3	0	—		28	2
Juventus	2007–08	Serie A	26	0	3	0	—		29	0
Juventus	2008–09	Serie A	12	2	1	0	1	0	14	2
Juventus	Total		63	4	7	0	1	0	71	4
Fiorentina	2009–10	Serie A	23	0	1	0	7	0	31	0
Fiorentina	2010–11	Serie A	6	0	1	0	—		7	0
Fiorentina	Total		29	0	2	0	7	0	38	0
Brescia	2010–11	Serie A	8	0	0	0	—		8	0
Brescia	2011–12	Serie B	0	0	0	0	—		0	0
Brescia	Total		8	0	0	0	—		8	0
Career total			308	6	25	0	47	1	380	7

=== International ===
Appearances and goals by national team and year
National team	Year	Apps	Goals
Italy
Italy	2001	1	0
Italy	2002	7	0
Italy	2003	7	1
Italy	2004	2	0
Total		17	1

Scores and results list Italy's goal tally first, score column indicates score after each Zanetti goal.

List of international goals scored by Cristiano Zanetti
No.	Date	Venue	Cap	Opponent	Score	Result	Competition
1	30 April 2003	Stade de Genève, Genève, Switzerland	11	Switzerland	2–1	2–1	Friendly

== Managerial statistics ==
Updated 10 April 2021

Team	Nat	From	To	Record				
Team	Nat	From	To	G	W	D	L	Win %
Massese	(Italy)	1 July 2017	22 January 2018	22	9	6	7	40.91
Total				22	9	6	7	40.91

== Honours ==
Fiorentina

- Coppa Italia: 1995–96

Roma

- Serie A: 2000–01

Inter Milan

- Serie A: 2005–06
- Coppa Italia: 2004–05, 2005–06
- Supercoppa Italiana: 2005

Juventus

- Serie B: 2006–07

Italy U21

- UEFA European Under-21 Championship: 2000
