= Alberto Malusci =

Italian footballer (born 1972)

Personal information
- Date of birth: 23 June 1972 (age 54)
- Place of birth: Pistoia, Italy
- Height: 1.85 m (6 ft 1 in)
- Position: Defender

Senior career*
Years	Team	Apps	(Gls)
1988–1996	Fiorentina	131	(4)
1996–1998	Marseille	27	(0)
1998	→ Foggia (loan)		
1998–2000	Cosenza		
2000–2002	Lecce		
2002–2003	Catania		
2004	Mons		
2004–2006	FC Brussels		
2006	→ Mons (loan)		
2006–2007	Sangiovannese		
2007–2008	Quarrata		

International career
1989	Italy U-19	7	(2)
1989–1994	Italy U-21	14	(1)
- * Club domestic league appearances and goals

Alberto Malusci (born 23 June 1972) is an Italian former football defender. While at Fiorentina he played in the 1990 UEFA Cup Final and won Serie B in the 1993–94 season.

== Honours ==
Fiorentina

- Coppa Italia: 1995–96
