= Gianmatteo Mareggini =

Italian footballer

Personal information
- Date of birth: 8 January 1967 (age 59)
- Place of birth: Modena, Italy
- Height: 1.83 m (6 ft 0 in)
- Position: Goalkeeper

Team information
- Current team: Figline (goalkeeping coach)

Youth career
- Fiorentina

Senior career*
Years	Team	Apps	(Gls)
1985–2000	Fiorentina	53	(0)
1986–1988	→ Rondinella (loan)	31	(0)
1988–1989	→ Lucchese (loan)	21	(0)
1989–1990	→ Carrarese (loan)	31	(0)
1993–1995	→ Palermo (loan)	61	(0)
1997–1998	→ Siena (loan)	21	(0)
2000–2003	Ternana	26	(0)
2003–2005	Livorno	18	(0)
2005–2009	Pistoiese	70	(0)
- * Club domestic league appearances and goals

Gianmatteo Mareggini (born 8 January 1967, in Modena) is an Italian former footballer, who played as a goalkeeper. He is currently a goalkeeping coach for Figline.

== Career ==
Mareggini spent most of his footballing career playing in Tuscany, most notably with Fiorentina, where he mainly played as a second-choice keeper from 1985 to 2000, representing the Florence club in the Italian top flight as well as in Serie B; during his time with Fiorentina, he had loan spells with several other clubs, mainly based in Tuscany. He played his last Serie A match at the age of 38 years, 134 days, on 22 May 2005 against Juventus, as a Livorno player. Mareggini retired in June 2009 after four seasons with Pistoiese in the lower Italian divisions.

== Honours ==
Fiorentina

- Coppa Italia: 1995–96
- Supercoppa Italiana: 1996
