= Massimo Orlando =

Italian footballer (born 1971)

Personal information
- Date of birth: 26 May 1971 (age 55)
- Place of birth: San Donà di Piave, Italy
- Height: 1.72 m (5 ft 8 in)
- Position: Midfielder

Team information
- Current team: Fiorentina (youth manager)

Senior career*
Years	Team	Apps	(Gls)
1986–1988	Conegliano Calcio		
1988–1990	Reggina	57	(3)
1990	Juventus	0	(0)
1990–1994	Fiorentina	101	(17)
1994–1995	Milan	2	(0)
1995–1997	Fiorentina	25	(1)
1997–1999	Atalanta	12	(1)
2000–2001	Pistoiese	1	(0)
Total		198	(22)

International career
1989–1992	Italy U-21	14	(1)
1993	Olympic Italy	3	(1)

Managerial career
- 2007–: Fiorentina (youth)
- * Club domestic league appearances and goals

Massimo Orlando (born 26 May 1971) is an Italian professional football coach and a former player, who played as a midfielder. He manages the youth team of ACF Fiorentina.

== Club career ==
Orlando was born in San Donà di Piave. After beginning his club career with Conegliano Calcio (1986–1988), he played for seven seasons (122 games, 16 goals) in the Serie A, for ACF Fiorentina (1990–97) winning the Serie B in the 1993–94 season, A.C. Milan (1994–95) and Atalanta B.C. (1997–99); he played for Juventus in 1990 without making an appearance in Serie A for the club during the 1990–91 season. He also played for Reggina (1988–90), and retired in 2001, after a spell with Pistoiese.

== International career ==
At international level, Orlando was a member of the Italy U21 national team that won the UEFA European Under-21 Football Championship under manager Cesare Maldini in 1992.

== Style of play ==
Regarded as a promising player in his youth, Orlando was a creative and technically gifted attacking midfielder, with an excellent left foot and good dribbling skills. Although he was usually deployed in the centre, he was also capable of playing on the left. A team-player, although he was not a prolific goalscorer, he was known for his unselfish playing style in midfield. Despite his talent, he struggled to live up to his potential and his career was also affected by several injuries.

== Honours ==
Fiorentina

- Coppa Italia: 1995–96
- Supercoppa Italiana: 1996 (on the roster, but not played in the game)

Milan

- Supercoppa Italiana: 1994 (both times on the roster, but not played in the game)
- UEFA Super Cup: 1994 (on the roster, but not played in the game)

Italy U21

- UEFA European Under-21 Football Championship: 1992
