= Fabrizio Di Mauro =

Italian footballer

Personal information
- Date of birth: 18 June 1965 (age 61)
- Place of birth: Rome, Italy
- Height: 1.75 m (5 ft 9 in)
- Position: Midfielder

Senior career*
Years	Team	Apps	(Gls)
1983–1992	Roma	95	(5)
1984–1987	→ Arezzo (loan)	72	(6)
1987–1988	→ Avellino (loan)	18	(2)
1992–1995	Fiorentina	57	(9)
1993–1994	→ Lazio (loan)	21	(2)
1995–1996	Reggiana	16	(0)
Total		279	(24)

International career
1993	Italy	3	(0)
- * Club domestic league appearances and goals

Fabrizio Di Mauro (Italian pronunciation: [faˈbrittsjo di ˈmauro]; born 18 June 1965) is an Italian former professional footballer who played as a midfielder. He is among the few players to play for both Roma and Lazio at senior level, winning his only honour with Roma in 1991, when the side won the Coppa Italia, also reaching the UEFA Cup final, only to lose out to Inter. He also spent a few seasons at Fiorentina, while he won three international caps with the Italy national football team, although he was not able to scorer any international goals. He was included in the Italy national squad during the team's qualification campaign for the 1994 FIFA World Cup, but was not picked for the final squad, following a lack of regular match-practice with Lazio the same season.

== Honours ==
Roma

- Coppa Italia: 1990–91
