= Daniele Carnasciali =

Italian footballer (born 1966)

Personal information
- Date of birth: 6 September 1966 (age 60)
- Place of birth: San Giovanni Valdarno, Italy
- Height: 1.82 m (5 ft 11 1/2 in)
- Position: Right back

Senior career*
| Years | Team | Apps | (Gls) |
| 1985–1986 | Mantova | 19 | (0) |
| 1986–1987 | Spezia | 25 | (0) |
| 1987–1990 | Opsitaletto | 88 | (2) |
| 1990–1992 | Brescia | 69 | (4) |
| 1992–1997 | Fiorentina | 141 | (2) |
| 1997–1998 | Bologna | 16 | (0) |
| 1998–1999 | Venezia | 28 | (0) |

International career
| 1994–1996 | Italy | 2 | (0) |
- * Club domestic league appearances and goals

Daniele Carnasciali (Italian pronunciation: [daˈnjɛːle karnaʃˈʃaːli]; born 6 September 1966) is a retired Italian professional footballer who played as a right back.

== Club career ==
Carnasciali played for 7 seasons (150 games, 2 goals) in the Italian Serie A for ACF Fiorentina, Bologna F.C. 1909 and A.C. Venezia.

In July 1997, he was sold to Bologna for 1.75 billion Italian lire, as part of Andrea Tarozzi's deal.

== International career ==
Carnasciali made his debut for the Italy national football team on 21 December 1994 in a match against Turkey.

== Honours ==
=== Club ===
Fiorentina

- Coppa Italia winner: 1995–96.
- Supercoppa Italiana winner: 1996.
