= Daniele Amerini =

Italian footballer (born 1974)

Personal information
- Date of birth: 3 August 1974 (age 52)
- Place of birth: Florence, Italy
- Height: 1.80 m (5 ft 11 in)
- Position: Midfielder

Youth career
- Fiorentina

Senior career*
Years	Team	Apps	(Gls)
1990–1991	Sestese	1	(0)
1991–1995	Fiorentina	27	(0)
1995–1997	Vicenza	40	(0)
1997	Hellas Verona	2	(0)
1997–1998	Lucchese	17	(0)
1998–1999	Hellas Verona	6	(0)
1999–2001	Pistoiese	63	(2)
2001–2002	Palermo	34	(0)
2002–2003	Venezia	45	(3)
Jan 2004	Pescara	10	(1)
2004	Arezzo	10	(0)
2005–2006	Modena	47	(1)
2006–2007	Reggina	36	(1)
2007–2008	Frosinone	31	(4)
2008–2009	Modena	18	(0)
- * Club domestic league appearances and goals

Daniele Amerini (born 3 August 1974 in Florence) is a former Italian footballer who played as a midfielder.

== Career ==
In October 1998, Amerini originally exchanged to Reggiana as part of Stefano Guidoni and Antonio Marasco deal, but the deal later collapsed after the contract failed to submit to Lega Calcio, as lack of Amerini's signature.

After Maurizio Zamparini purchased Palermo in July 2002, Zamparini signed most of the squad of Venezia he previous own, and sent Amerini and Andrea Guerra to Venezia.

In November 2008, Amerini returned to Serie B club Modena on free transfer.
