= Gianluca Luppi =

Italian footballer and coach

Personal information
- Date of birth: 23 August 1966 (age 60)
- Place of birth: Crevalcore, Italy
- Height: 1.81 m (5 ft 11 1/2 in)
- Position: Defender

Senior career*
Years	Team	Apps	(Gls)
1984–1990	Bologna	180	(5)
1990–1992	Juventus	38	(0)
1992–1995	Fiorentina	84	(4)
1995–1996	Atalanta	19	(0)
1996–1997	Ravenna	24	(2)
1997–2001	Venezia	105	(4)
2001–2002	Napoli	28	(4)
2002–2003	Cesena	19	(2)
2003–2004	Ravenna	16	(0)
2004–2006	Crevalcore	42	(2)

Managerial career
- 2007–2008: Bologna (asst)
- 2010–2011: Venezia
- 2012–2015: Mezzolara
- * Club domestic league appearances and goals

Gianluca Luppi (born 23 August 1966) is an Italian professional football coach and former player, who played as a defender.
