= 1993–94 Serie B =

Italian football league season

Serie B
- Season: 1993–94
- Promoted: Fiorentina (3rd title); Bari; Brescia; Padova
- Relegated: Pisa (bankruptcy); Ravenna; Modena; Monza
- Matches: 380
- Goals: 783 (2.06 per match)
- Top goalscorer: (Italy) Massimo Agostini (18 goals)

Serie B 1993-94 team distribution

The Serie B 1993–94 was the sixty-second tournament of this competition played in Italy since its creation.

== Teams ==
Ravenna, Vicenza, Palermo and Acireale had been promoted from Serie C, while Brescia, Fiorentina, Ancona and Pescara had been relegated from Serie A.

== Final classification ==
Pos	Team	Pld	W	D	L	GF	GA	GD	Pts	Promotion or relegation
1	Fiorentina (P, C)	38	17	16	5	53	19	+34	50	Promotion to Serie A
2	Bari (P)	38	14	17	7	49	27	+22	45	Promotion to Serie A
3	Brescia (P)	38	15	14	9	68	53	+15	44	Promotion to Serie A
4	Padova (P)	38	11	21	6	37	29	+8	43	Serie A after tie-breaker
5	Cesena	38	17	9	12	49	48	+1	43	Promotion tie-breaker
6	Venezia	38	13	14	11	43	40	+3	40	
6	Ascoli	38	13	14	11	38	38	0	40	
8	Ancona	38	11	17	10	46	43	+3	39	
8	Fidelis Andria	38	8	23	7	28	28	0	39	
10	Lucchese	38	8	21	9	34	35	−1	37	
10	Vicenza	38	9	19	10	30	33	−3	37	
10	Verona	38	11	15	12	36	42	−6	37	
10	Cosenza	38	10	17	11	30	38	−8	37	
14	Palermo	38	12	12	14	32	38	−6	36	
15	Pescara (Note: 3 points deducted)	38	12	14	12	50	54	−4	35	
16	Acireale	38	8	19	11	32	39	−7	35	Relegation tie-breaker (Note: Qualified to the relegation tie-breaker for worst head-to-head points against Pescara.)
17	Pisa (R, E, R, R)	38	10	15	13	36	40	−4	35	Phoenix in Eccellenza (Note: Pisa went bankrupt and lost their professional status.)
18	Ravenna (R)	38	8	15	15	36	47	−11	31	Relegation to Serie C1
18	Modena (R)	38	8	15	15	29	45	−16	31	Relegation to Serie C1
20	Monza (R)	38	5	13	20	27	47	−20	23	Relegation to Serie C1

Source: Head-to-head points used for three or more clubs finishing at the same result.
(C) Champions; (E) Eliminated; (P) Promoted; (R) Relegated

== Results ==
Home \ Away	ACR	ANC	ASC	BAR	BRE	CES	COS	FAN	FIO	LUC	MOD	MON	PAD	PAL	PES	PIS	RAV	VEN	HEL	VIC
Acireale		1–1	1–1	1–0	2–2	1–2	0–0	2–1	0–0	2–1	0–0	2–1	0–0	1–0	1–1	1–2	3–3	1–1	1–0	1–0
Ancona	1–1		2–0	3–1	3–2	4–1	1–0	0–0	1–1	3–1	2–0	1–1	1–1	3–0	2–0	1–1	1–1	2–3	2–2	0–0
Ascoli	1–0	1–0		1–1	4–4	1–0	1–1	0–0	1–0	0–0	3–0	2–0	3–1	1–0	1–0	1–1	1–0	3–2	3–1	1–1
Bari	0–0	3–2	3–1		4–0	0–1	0–0	1–1	0–1	3–0	4–0	0–0	1–1	0–1	3–3	1–0	1–0	0–0	2–0	1–0
Brescia	2–1	3–1	1–1	1–1		1–1	1–1	2–0	3–1	2–1	1–2	5–0	1–0	1–0	3–1	4–1	2–1	4–2	1–1	1–0
Cesena	4–1	0–0	2–1	1–0	2–5		0–1	3–2	1–0	2–2	2–1	2–2	0–0	1–1	1–1	1–0	0–2	1–0	1–2	2–0
Cosenza	0–0	1–1	0–1	1–1	2–1	1–0		0–0	1–1	1–1	1–0	1–1	1–1	1–0	0–2	2–0	2–0	1–1	1–0	1–0
Fidelis Andria	1–1	0–0	2–1	0–0	0–0	1–2	1–0		0–0	1–1	1–0	1–0	0–0	0–0	0–1	0–0	1–1	0–0	2–2	1–0
Fiorentina	1–0	3–0	5–1	0–0	2–1	2–3	3–0	3–1		1–1	0–0	3–0	2–0	4–1	0–0	4–1	2–0	4–0	2–0	1–1
Lucchese	1–0	2–0	0–0	1–1	1–1	0–1	2–0	2–2	1–1		0–0	2–0	2–2	0–0	2–0	1–0	1–0	0–0	1–1	0–0
Modena	1–1	1–1	0–0	0–1	2–1	1–0	2–0	0–1	0–1	1–0		1–1	1–1	0–0	0–0	1–0	3–3	1–2	1–0	1–2
Monza	0–0	2–1	1–1	0–1	0–2	0–1	0–0	2–0	0–0	0–0	1–3		0–1	3–1	1–1	3–1	4–0	0–0	0–1	0–0
Padova	2–0	0–0	1–0	1–2	2–1	3–1	2–1	1–1	0–0	1–1	0–0	1–0		0–0	2–0	2–0	2–2	0–0	2–0	0–0
Palermo	1–0	0–1	3–0	1–0	2–2	3–2	3–1	0–0	0–3	1–0	1–1	1–0	2–2		3–2	1–0	0–1	0–0	2–0	0–1
Pescara	3–1	2–1	1–0	1–1	1–1	2–1	2–2	0–3	1–0	1–2	4–2	2–1	1–3	2–2		1–0	4–1	3–1	0–2	2–2
Pisa	1–1	1–1	1–0	2–2	4–2	1–1	3–0	0–0	0–0	0–0	3–0	2–1	0–0	2–0	1–1		0–0	1–0	1–0	1–0
Ravenna	1–1	0–1	0–0	0–0	2–2	1–2	2–2	0–1	0–0	1–0	2–2	2–1	0–0	0–1	2–0	2–1		1–1	3–2	2–0
Venezia	0–2	4–0	2–1	1–1	2–0	0–1	2–0	2–2	0–2	5–3	3–0	2–1	2–0	1–0	0–0	3–2	1–0		0–1	0–0
Hellas Verona	3–1	1–1	1–0	0–4	0–0	2–2	2–2	0–0	0–0	1–1	0–0	2–0	2–1	1–1	3–1	0–0	1–0	2–0		0–0
Vicenza	0–0	2–1	0–0	1–5	2–2	3–1	0–1	1–1	0–0	0–0	2–1	1–0	1–1	1–0	3–3	2–2	1–0	0–0	3–0	

Source: Almanacco Illustrato del Calcio - La Storia 1898-2004, Panini Edizioni, Modena, September 2005
Legend: Blue = home team win; Yellow = draw; Red = away team win.

== Tie-breakers ==
=== Promotion tie-breaker ===
15 June 1994
17:00 CEST

Padova	2–1	Cesena
Cuicchi 18'; Coppola 69'		Hübner 7'

Stadio Giovanni Zini, Cremona
Attendance: 15,516
Referee: Piero Ceccarini

Padova promoted to Serie A.

=== Relegation tie-breaker ===
Played in Salerno on June 14

Team 1	Score	Team 2
Acireale (Italy)	0-0; 4-3(pen)	(Italy) Pisa

Pisa relegated and later went bankrupt.

== Attendances ==
#	Club	Average
1	Fiorentina	26,998
2	Bari	16,393
3	Palermo	15,164
4	Hellas	10,922
5	Vicenza	10,366
6	Padova	9,367
7	Brescia	9,286
8	Pescara	8,626
9	Cesena	7,342
10	Ancona	7,041
11	Cosenza	6,610
12	Pisa	5,848
13	Ravenna	5,556
14	Fidelis Andria	5,276
15	Ascoli	5,041
16	Modena	5,039
17	Lucchese	4,805
18	Venezia	4,425
19	Acireale	4,030
20	Monza	2,542
