= 1984–85 Lanerossi Vicenza season =

Società Sportiva Lanerossi Vicenza
1984–1985 season
- President: Dario Maraschin
- Manager: Bruno Giorgi
- Stadium: Romeo Menti
- Serie C1: 2nd (in Serie B)
- Coppa Italia: Group stage
- Coppa Italia Serie C: Eightfinals
- Top goalscorer: Rondon (16)
Home colours	Away colours

During 1984–85 season Lanerossi Vicenza played its fourth consecutive season in Serie C1 after relegation from 1980–81 Serie B.

== Summary ==
The squad reaches the second spot with 45 points, clinching the promotion to Serie B after won a tie-breaker match against Piacenza Calcio a result that was object of Judicial investigation, included in the Totonero 1986 scandal.

18-yr-old playmaker Roberto Baggio scored 12 goals in 25 matches played and was transferred out after Fiorentina bought him in 2 800 million of Italian lire (€1.39 million) on 3 May 1985 in spite of being injured only two days later while playing against Arrigo Sacchi's Rimini.

== Squad ==
Note: Flags indicate national team as defined under FIFA eligibility rules; some limited exceptions apply. Players may hold more than one non-FIFA nationality.

Pos.	Nation	Player
GK	ITA	Claudio Maiani
GK	ITA	Massimo Mattiazzo
DF	ITA	Paolo Mazzeni
DF	ITA	Luigino Pasciullo
DF	ITA	Alfonso Bertozzi
DF	ITA	Giuseppe Mascheroni
DF	ITA	Danio Montani
DF	ITA	Giuseppe Pallavicini
MF	ITA	Eligio Nicolini
MF	ITA	Roberto Filippi

Pos.	Nation	Player
MF	ITA	Maurizio Schincaglia
MF	ITA	Franco Cerilli
MF	ITA	Andrea Messersi
MF	ITA	Piergiorgio Zanandrea
FW	ITA	Roberto Baggio
FW	ITA	Alberto Briaschi
FW	ITA	Paolo Mariani
FW	ITA	Antonio Rondon
FW	ITA	Maurizio Lucchetti

== Competitions ==
=== Serie C1 ===
==== League table ====
Pos	Team	Pts	Promotion or relegation
1	Brescia (P)	48	Promoted to 1985–86 Serie B
2	Lanerossi Vicenza (P)	45	Promoted to 1985–86 Serie B
3	Piacenza	45	
4	Rimini	40	
5	Reggiana	36	

Source: rsssf.com
(P) Promoted

==== Matches ====
23 September 1984 1	Lanerossi	1–1	Piacenza Calcio	Vicenza
	Cusciello 9'		67' Filosofi	Stadium: Romeo Menti; Referee: Catania

30 September 1984 2	Rondinella Calcio	1–2	Lanerossi
			41' Baggio; 73' (pen.) Baggio

7 October 1984 3	Lanerossi	1–0	Treviso F.B.C. 1993	Vicenza
	Mazzeni			Stadium: Romeo Menti

14 October 1984 4	SPAL	2–2	Lanerossi	Ferrara
	Pregnolato 19'; De Gradi 32'		63' Rondon; 89' Rondon	Stadium: Paolo Mazza; Referee: Bailo

21 October 1984 5	Lanerossi	2–2	Modena	Vicenza
	Baggio 45'			Stadium: Romeo Menti

28 October 1984 6	A.C. Ancona	1–1	Lanerossi

1 November 1984 7	A.C. Reggiana	2–2	Lanerossi
	D'Agostino 32' (pen.); Cei 87'		14' Messersi; 71'Lucchetti

11 November 1984 8	Lanerossi	0–0	Jesina Calcio	Vicenza
				Stadium: Romeo Menti

18 November 1984 9	A.C. Pistoiese	0–2	Lanerossi
			Baggio

25 November 1984 10	Lanerossi	0–0	U.S. Sanremese Calcio	Vicenza
				Stadium: Romeo Menti

2 December 1984 11	Livorno	0–0	Lanerossi	Livorno
				Stadium: Ardenza

16 December 1984 13	Asti TSC	0–0	Lanerossi

19 December 1984 12	Lanerossi	3–0	Rimini	Vicenza
	Baggio 48'; Baggio 56'			Stadium: Romeo Menti
Note: Suspended on 9 December at 61' due to fog with a 2-1 score.

23 December 1984 14	Lanerossi	1–1	A.C. Legnano	Vicenza
	Baggio 70' (pen.)			Stadium: Romeo Menti

6 January 1985 15	Brescia Calcio	3–0	Lanerossi	Brescia
	Gritti 9'; Maragliulio 46'; Zoratto 67'			Stadium: Mario Rigamonti; Referee: Pucci

13 January 1985 16	Lanerossi	2–1	A.C. Pavia	Vicenza
	Baggio 3' (pen.)			Stadium: Romeo Menti

20 January 1985 17	Carrarese Calcio	4–4	Lanerossi
			30' (pen.) Baggio

3 February 1985 18	Piacenza Calcio	1–1	Lanerossi	Piacenza
	Crialesi 61'		38' Rondon	Stadium: Galleana; Referee: Bailo

10 February 1985 19	Lanerossi	1–0	Rondinella Calcio	Vicenza
	Baggio 56' (pen.)			Stadium: Romeo Menti

17 February 1985 20	Treviso	0–2	Lanerossi	Treviso

24 February 1985 21	Lanerossi	0–1	SPAL	Vicenza
			16' Bresciani	Stadium: Romeo Menti

3 March 1985 22	Modena	0–0	Lanerossi

10 March 1985 23	Lanerossi	1–0	A.C. Ancona	Vicenza
				Stadium: Romeo Menti

17 March 1985 24	Lanerossi	3–0	A.C. Reggiana	Vicenza
	Pasciullo 30'; Rondon 41'; Baggio 81' (pen.)			Stadium: Romeo Menti

24 March 1985 25	Jesina Calcio	0–0	Lanerossi

6 April 1985 26	Lanerossi	3–0	A.C. Pistoiese	Romeo Menti
		location =Vicenza

14 April 1985 27	Sanremese	0–0	Lanerossi

21 April 1985 28	Lanerossi	3–0	Livorno	Vicenza
	Montani 15'; Rondon 53'; Nicolini 83'			Stadium: Romeo Menti

5 May 1985 29	Rimini	2–1	Lanerossi
			4'Baggio; 8' Baggio

12 May 1985 30	Lanerossi	3–0	Asti	Vicenza
				Stadium: Romeo Menti

19 May 1985 31	Legnano	0–1	Lanerossi

26 May 1985 32	Lanerossi	1–1	Brescia Calcio	Vicenza
	Messersì 63'		38' Ascagni	Stadium: Romeo Menti; Referee: Baldas

2 June 1985 33	Pavia	0–0	Lanerossi

9 June 1985 34	Lanerossi	3–0	Carrarese	Vicenza
				Stadium: Romeo Menti

=== Tie-breaker match ===
16 June 1985	Lanerossi Vicenza	3–1 (a.e.t.)	Piacenza Calcio	Florence
	Cerilli 63'; Rondon 94'; Mascheroni 96'		77' Carlo	Stadium: Artemio Franchi; Attendance: 16 000; Referee: Angelo Amendolia

=== Coppa Italia ===
==== Group stage ====
Pos	Team	Pld	W	D	L	GF	GA	GD	Pts
1	Empoli	5	3	1	1	8	5	+3	7
2	Torino	5	2	3	0	4	1	+3	7
3	Cesena	5	1	2	2	5	5	0	4
4	Vicenza	5	1	2	2	6	7	−1	4
5	Monza	5	1	2	2	4	6	−2	4
6	Cremonese	5	1	2	2	6	9	−3	4

Coppa Italia group stage results
Date	Opponent	Venue	Result	Scorers
22 August 1984	Cremonese	Home	2–0	Messersì 14', Lucchetti 87'
26 August 1984	Empoli	Away	2–4	Lucchetti 21', Baggio 81' pen.
29 August 1984	Torino	Home	0–0	
2 September 1984	Cesena	Home	1–1	Baggio 90' pen.
9 September 1984	Monza	Away	1–2	Eligio 57'

=== Coppa Italia Serie C ===
==== Round of 32 ====
Team 1	Agg.	Team 2	1st leg	2nd leg
Mestre	2–5	Lanerossi Vicenza	1–3	1–2

==== Eightfinals ====
Team 1	Agg.	Team 2	1st leg	2nd leg
Lanerossi Vicenza	2–6	Ospitaletto	0–2	2–4

== Statistics ==
=== Squad statistics ===
Competition	Points	Home						Away						Total						GD
Competition	Points	G	W	D	L	Gs	Ga	G	W	D	L	Gs	Ga	G	W	D	L	Gs	Ga	GD
Serie C1	45	17	10	6	1	28	7	17	4	11	2	19	16	34	14	17	3	47	23	+24
Coppa Italia	Group stage	3	1	2	0	3	1	2	0	0	2	3	6	5	1	2	2	6	7	−1
Coppa Italia Serie C	Eightfinals	2	1	0	1	2	3	2	1	0	1	5	5	4	2	0	2	7	8	−1
Total	45	22	12	8	2	33	11	21	5	11	5	27	27	43	17	19	7	60	38	+22

=== Players statistics ===
No.	Pos	Nat	Player	Total		1984-85 Serie C1	
No.	Pos	Nat	Player	Apps	Goals	Apps	Goals
	GK	(Italy) ITA	Claudio Maiani	20	0	20	0
	GK	(Italy) ITA	Massimo Mattiazzo	14	0	14	0
	DF	(Italy) ITA	Paolo Mazzeni	34	3	34	3
	DF	(Italy) ITA	Luigino Pasciullo	33	2	33	2
	DF	(Italy) ITA	Alfonso Bertozzi	11	0	11	0
	DF	(Italy) ITA	Giuseppe Mascheroni	33	0	33	0
	DF	(Italy) ITA	Danio Montani	27	1	27	1
	DF	(Italy) ITA	Giuseppe Pallavicini	12	1	12	1
	MF	(Italy) ITA	Eligio Nicolini	33	5	33	5
	MF	(Italy) ITA	Roberto Filippi	28	1	28	1
	MF	(Italy) ITA	Maurizio Schincaglia	17	1	17	1
	MF	(Italy) ITA	Franco Cerilli	28	0	28	0
	MF	(Italy) ITA	Andrea Messersi	33	2	33	2
	MF	(Italy) ITA	Piergiorgio Zanandrea	3	0	3	0
	FW	(Italy) ITA	Roberto Baggio	29	12	28+1	12
	FW	(Italy) ITA	Alberto Briaschi	1	0	1	0
	FW	(Italy) ITA	Paolo Mariani	28	0	28	0
	FW	(Italy) ITA	Antonio Rondon	22	16	22	16
	FW	(Italy) ITA	Maurizio Lucchetti	22	1	22	1

- Source: https://www.carrierecalciatori.it/it/statistiche/Vicenza-1984
