= Roberto Baggio =

Italian former footballer (born 1967)

Roberto Baggio OMRI
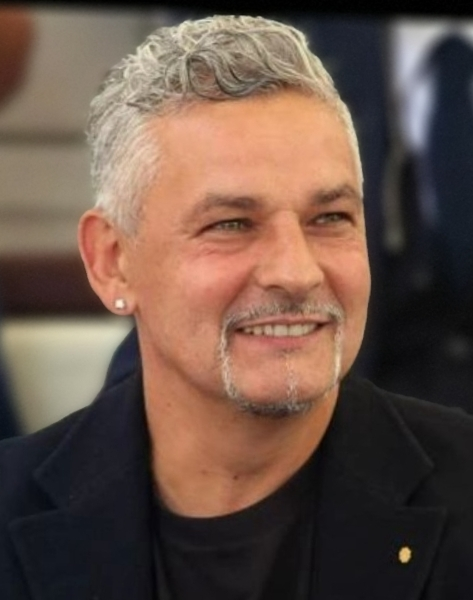
- Baggio in 2023

Personal information
- Full name: Roberto Baggio
- Date of birth: 18 February 1967 (age 59)
- Place of birth: Caldogno, Italy
- Height: 1.74 m (5 ft 9 in)
- Positions: Second striker; attacking midfielder

Youth career
- 1974–1980: Caldogno
- 1980–1983: Vicenza

Senior career*
Years	Team	Apps	(Gls)
1982–1985	Vicenza	36	(13)
1985–1990	Fiorentina	94	(39)
1990–1995	Juventus	141	(78)
1995–1997	AC Milan	51	(12)
1997–1998	Bologna	30	(22)
1998–2000	Inter Milan	41	(9)
2000–2004	Brescia	95	(45)
Total		488	(218)

International career
1984	Italy U16	4	(3)
1988–2004	Italy	56	(27)
Medal record
Men's Football
Representing Italy
FIFA World Cup
Runner-up	1994
Third place	1990
- * Club domestic league appearances and goals

Roberto Baggio (Italian pronunciation: [roˈbɛrto ˈbaddʒo]; born 18 February 1967) is an Italian former professional footballer who mainly played as a second striker, or as an attacking midfielder. He is also the former president of the technical sector of the Italian Football Federation. A creative playmaker and set piece specialist known for his curling free-kicks, dribbling, and goalscoring, Baggio is regarded as one of the greatest players of all time.

In 1999, Baggio came fourth in the FIFA Player of the Century internet poll, and was chosen on the FIFA World Cup Dream Team in 2002. In 1993, he was named FIFA World Player of the Year and won the Ballon d'Or. In 2004, he was named by Pelé in the FIFA 100, a list of the world's greatest living players.

Baggio played for Italy in 56 matches and is the joint fourth-highest goalscorer for his national team. He starred in the Italian team that finished third in the 1990 FIFA World Cup. At the 1994 World Cup, he led Italy to the final, received the World Cup Silver Ball and was named in the World Cup All-Star Team. Although he was the star performer for Italy at the tournament, he missed the decisive penalty in the shootout of the final against Brazil. Baggio is the only Italian to score in three World Cups, and with nine goals holds the record for most goals scored in World Cup tournaments for Italy, along with Paolo Rossi and Christian Vieri.

In 2002, Baggio became the first Italian player in over 50 years to score more than 300 career goals; he is the fifth-highest scoring Italian in all competitions with 318 goals. In 2004, during the final season of his career, Baggio became the first player in over 30 years to score 200 goals in Serie A, and is the seventh-highest goalscorer of all time in Serie A, with 205 goals. In 1990, he moved from Fiorentina to Juventus for a world record transfer fee. Baggio won two Serie A titles, a Coppa Italia, and a UEFA Cup, playing for seven different Italian clubs during his career (Vicenza, Fiorentina, Juventus, AC Milan, Bologna, Inter Milan, and Brescia).

Baggio is known as Il Divin Codino ("The Divine Ponytail"), for the hairstyle he wore for most of his career, for his talent, and for his Buddhist beliefs. In 2002, Baggio was nominated Goodwill Ambassador of the Food and Agriculture Organization of the United Nations. In 2003, he was the inaugural winner of the Golden Foot award. In recognition of his human rights activism, he received the Man of Peace award from the Nobel Peace Prize Laureates in 2010. In 2011, he was the first footballer to be inducted into the Italian Football Hall of Fame.

== Early life ==
Roberto Baggio was born in Caldogno, Veneto, the son of Matilde and Florindo Baggio, the sixth of eight siblings. His younger brother, Eddy Baggio, was also a footballer.

== Club career ==
=== 1976–1985: Early career and Vicenza ===
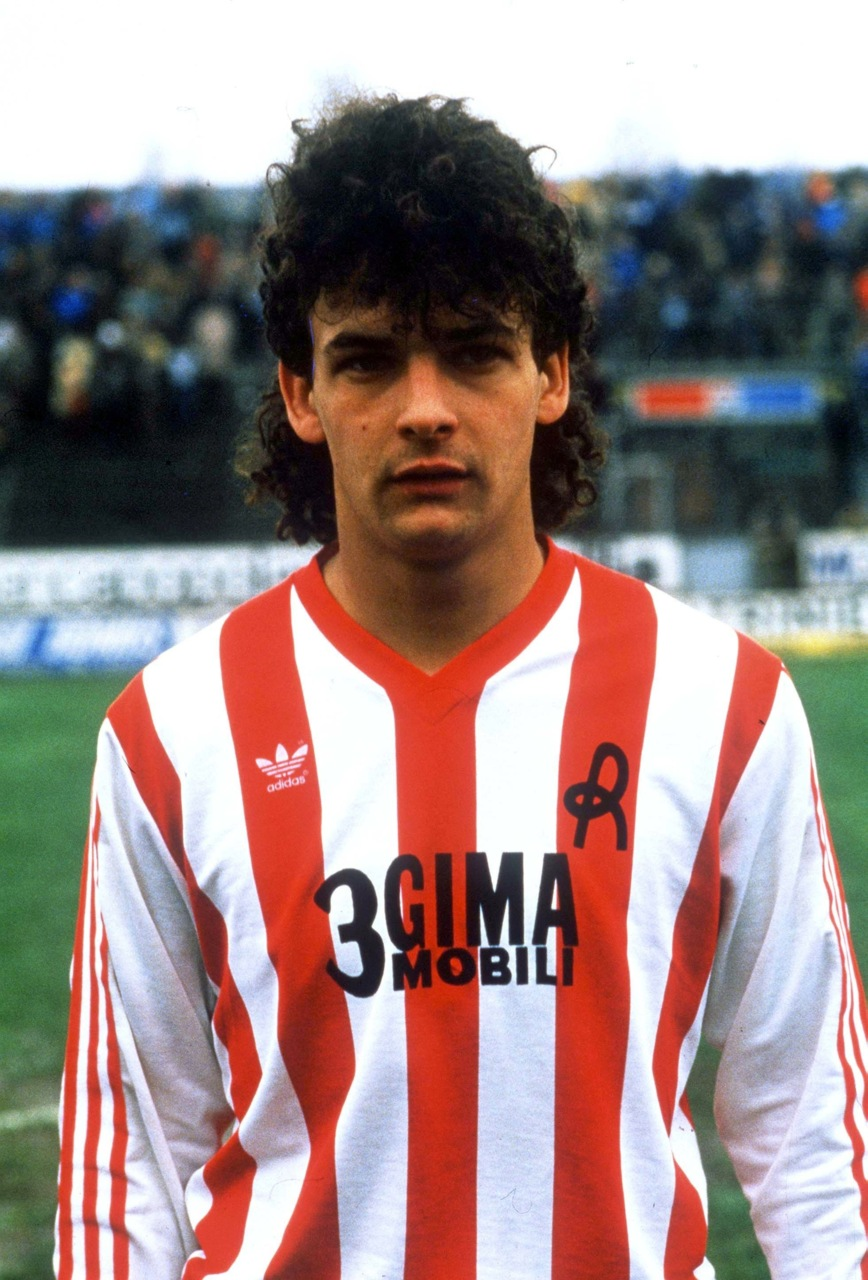
Baggio on his debut with Vicenza

Baggio began his youth career after being noticed by his hometown youth team, Caldogno, at age nine. By the time he turned 11, he had scored 45 goals and provided 20 assists in 26 matches, also scoring six goals in one match. His talent was recognised by scout Antonio Mora, and he was acquired by the Vicenza youth team at age 13 for £300 (500,000 Lit). After scoring 110 goals in 120 matches, Baggio began his professional career with the Vicenza senior side in 1983, at age 15.

At the age of 16, Baggio made his Serie C1 debut with Vicenza on 5 June 1983, a 1–0 home loss against Piacenza, in the final league match of the season, coming on as a second-half substitute. He scored his first goal in Serie C1 during the following season, on 3 June 1984, from a penalty in a 3–0 win against Brescia, the club with which he retired in 2004. Baggio scored the first professional goal of his career in the Coppa Italia Serie C in a 4–1 away win over Legnano on 30 November 1983. He also made his Coppa Italia debut with the club on 31 August 1983, against Palermo, and he scored his first Coppa Italia goal in a 4–2 away loss to Empoli, on 26 August 1984. During the 1984–85 Serie C1 season under manager Bruno Giorgi, he scored 12 goals in 29 appearances, helping the club to gain promotion to Serie B. Baggio began to draw the attention of larger Italian clubs, in particular Serie A side Fiorentina, and his playing style was compared to that of his idol Zico. Baggio was also awarded the Guerin d'Oro in 1985 as the Best Player in Serie C1.

During the end of his final season at Vicenza, Baggio shattered both the anterior cruciate ligament (ACL) and the meniscus of his right knee while playing against Rimini on 5 May 1985, while attempting a slide tackle. The injury occurred two days before his official transfer deal to Fiorentina had been finalised, and it seriously threatened his career, at age 18. Although several team doctors feared he would not play again, Fiorentina retained their faith in him, agreeing to commit to the transfer as well as fund the required surgery, one of many reasons for Baggio's attachment to the club.

=== 1985–1990: Fiorentina ===
Fiorentina purchased Baggio in 1985 for £1.5 million. During his time at the club, despite initial injuries, he became extremely popular, and is regarded as one of the club's best ever players. In his first season with the club, Baggio did not appear in Serie A as he was sidelined by injury; Fiorentina finished in fifth place in the league and reached the semi-finals of the Coppa Italia, with Baggio making his club debut in the latter competition on 29 January 1986, coming on as a second-half substitute for Davide Pellegrini in a 3–1 home win over Udinese in the round of 16. He finally made his Serie A debut the following season on 21 September 1986, in a 2–0 home win against Sampdoria, and he also made his European debut that season on 17 September 1986, in a 1–0 home win in a UEFA Cup match against Boavista. Baggio suffered another knee injury on 28 September, and he was operated again, requiring 220 stitches to have it rebuilt, losing 12 kg as a result and missing most of the season. Baggio returned, and scored his first league goal from a free-kick on 10 May 1987 in a 1–1 draw against Diego Maradona's Napoli, the eventual Serie A champions; Baggio's equaliser saved Fiorentina from relegation.

"The angels sing in his legs."

— Former Fiorentina manager Aldo Agroppi on Baggio.

Baggio led Fiorentina to a Coppa Italia quarter-final during the 1988–89 season under manager Sven-Göran Eriksson, scoring nine goals, as Fiorentina were eliminated by eventual champions Sampdoria. This season would be Baggio's breakthrough, as he scored 15 goals in Serie A, finishing third in the capocannoniere (top goalscorer) title. He also helped Fiorentina finish in seventh place in Serie A and win an UEFA Cup spot, assisting the only goal by Roberto Pruzzo in the tiebreak qualifier against Roma. He formed a notable attacking partnership with Stefano Borgonovo, and the pair scored 29 of Fiorentina's 44 Serie A goals, earning the nickname "B2". Baggio's performances elevated him to hero status among the fans, and he drew praise from several pundits. His characteristics led former Fiorentina playmaker Miguel Montuori to say Baggio was "more productive than Maradona; he is without doubt the best number 10 in the league", also stating that Baggio had "ice in his veins" due to his composure in front of goal.

Although Fiorentina were struggling against relegation during the 1989–90 season, Baggio led the club to the 1990 UEFA Cup final, only to be defeated by his future club, Juventus. Baggio scored 1 goal in 12 appearances in the competition, in a round of 16 1–0 home win against Dynamo Kyiv, from a penalty, on 22 November 1989; this was his first goal in European competitions. He also scored the decisive penalty in the first round shootout against Atlético Madrid. With 17 goals, Baggio was the second-highest goalscorer in the 1989–90 Serie A season after Marco van Basten, and was awarded the Bravo Award as the best under-23 player in European competitions. He also placed eighth in the 1990 Ballon d'Or. With Fiorentina, Baggio scored 55 goals in 136 appearances, 39 of which were in Serie A, from 94 appearances.

=== 1990–1995: Juventus ===
"One game stands out in particular, one against Ancona [actually Udinese] which we won 5–1 [actually 5–0]. Baggio scored four goals in the first 20 minutes and killed the game off. I don't think I've seen a better performance from any player in any game I've ever played in. For half an hour, he was on fire. As footballers go, he's a genius."

— Former Juventus teammate David Platt on Baggio, 1995.

In 1990, Baggio was sold to one of Fiorentina's rivals, Juventus, for £8 million, the world record transfer for a footballer at the time. He inherited the number 10 shirt, formerly worn by Michel Platini. Following the transfer, there were riots on the streets of Florence, where 50 people were injured. Baggio replied to his fans, saying: "I was compelled to accept the transfer."

When Juventus played Fiorentina on 7 April 1991, Baggio refused to take a penalty, stating Fiorentina goalkeeper Gianmatteo Mareggini knew him too well. However, Luigi De Agostini, Baggio's replacement, missed the penalty and Juventus eventually lost the match. When Baggio was substituted, he picked up a Fiorentina scarf thrown onto the field, a gesture which, although appreciated by his former club's fans, caused outrage among the Juventus supporters, who were initially reluctant to accept Baggio. He claimed to be "always purple" in his heart, with purple being the colour of Fiorentina.

In this first season at Juventus, Baggio scored 14 goals and provided 12 assists in Serie A, often playing behind the forwards under Luigi Maifredi, although Juventus finished in seventh place in Serie A, outside the European qualification spots. However, Juventus did reach the semi-finals of the European Cup Winners' Cup that year, a tournament in which Baggio was top scorer with nine goals, bringing his seasonal total to 27 goals. Juventus would ultimately be eliminated by Johan Cruyff's Barcelona "Dream Team". Juventus were also eliminated in the quarter-finals of the Coppa Italia to eventual winners Roma, with Baggio scoring three goals. Juventus also lost the Supercoppa Italiana against Napoli at the beginning of the season; Baggio scored Juventus's only goal from a free-kick. Baggio made his 100th Serie A appearance in a 0–0 draw against Lazio on 21 October 1990.

In his second season, under new manager Giovanni Trapattoni, Baggio finished runner-up to Marco van Basten for the Serie A top scorer title, scoring 18 goals and providing 8 assists, as Juventus finished runners-up to Fabio Capello's AC Milan in Serie A, and to Parma in the Coppa Italia final, in which Baggio scored in his club's 1–0 victory in the first leg from a penalty. It was during his second season with the club that Baggio came to be accepted by the Juventus fans, as he was seen as a leader around whom the club's play revolved. However, Trapattoni often deployed Baggio in a more advanced role, which led to minor disagreements between the player, his coach and Juventus management.

Baggio was appointed team captain for the 1992–93 season. He had a dominant season, winning the only European club trophy of his career after helping Juventus to the UEFA Cup final, in which he scored twice and assisted another goal over both legs, defeating Borussia Dortmund 6–1 on aggregate. En route to the final, Baggio scored two goals in the 2–1 home victory against Paris Saint-Germain, in the first leg of the semi-final, and he went on to score the only goal in the return leg. Juventus also reached the semi-finals of the Coppa Italia, losing on away goals to local rivals and winners Torino. Juventus finished fourth in Serie A that season, although they managed a 3–1 away win against the Serie A champions Milan, with Baggio scoring a memorable individual goal while also setting-up Andreas Möller's first goal of the match. One of the highlights of the season involved Baggio scoring four goals in open play against Udinese in a 5–0 Juventus home win. Baggio was once again runner-up for the Serie A capocannoniere title with 21 goals and 6 assists. He scored a personal best of 30 goals in all club competitions that season, in addition to five goals with the Italy national team. During the 1993 calendar year, Baggio managed a personal record 39 goals across all competitions, scoring 23 goals in Serie A, 3 in the Coppa Italia, 8 goals in European competitions and 5 goals for Italy, helping his national side qualify for the World Cup. Baggio's performances throughout the year earned him both the European Footballer of the Year, with 142 points from a possible 150, and the FIFA World Player of the Year awards. He was also awarded the Onze d'Or, and the World Soccer Player of the Year Award.

In the 1993–94 season, Baggio often played as a second striker alongside Gianluca Vialli or Fabrizio Ravanelli, and occasionally the young Alessandro Del Piero; Juventus once again finished runners up to Milan in Serie A, and Baggio finished third in the capocannoniere title with 17 goals and 8 assists, while the club suffered a quarter-final elimination in the UEFA Cup against Cagliari. On 31 October 1993, Baggio scored a hat-trick in a 4–0 win over Genoa, which included his 100th Serie A goal; he also set up a goal for Möller during the match. Baggio made his 200th Serie A appearance on 5 December 1993 in a 1–0 win over Napoli. After sustaining an injury earlier that season, Baggio was operated on his meniscus in March 1994. Baggio placed second in the 1994 Ballon d'Or, third in the 1994 FIFA World Player of the Year, and was awarded the 1994 Onze de Bronze.

In the 1994–95 season, Trapattoni's replacement, Marcello Lippi, wanted to create a more cohesive team, less dependent on Baggio, who was deployed as an outside forward in a 4–3–3 formation. Baggio was injured for most of the season, being ruled out for over three months after sustaining a knee injury against Padova on 27 November 1994. After scoring from a free-kick, he was substituted by Alessandro Del Piero, who temporarily took his place in the team. Baggio returned to the starting line-up in the first leg of the Coppa Italia semi-final against Lazio in Rome on 8 March 1995, setting up Fabrizio Ravanelli's winner. On his first Serie A match back from injury, on 12 March 1995, Baggio scored Juventus' second goal in a 2–0 win over Foggia, and set up Ravanelli's goal. Due to his injury, Baggio only managed 17 Serie A appearances, but still contributed to his first scudetto with Juventus by contributing eight goals and eight assists. He provided assists for three of the goals in the title-deciding match against Parma, which Juventus won 4–0 in Turin on 21 May 1995. He helped Juventus win the Coppa Italia that year, notching two goals and two assists, scoring the winning goal in the second leg of the semi-final. He helped lead Juventus to another UEFA Cup final by scoring four goals, including two goals and an assist over both legs of the semi-finals against Borussia Dortmund. Despite Baggio's strong performance, Juventus were defeated in the UEFA Cup final by Parma.

Baggio scored 115 goals in 200 appearances during his five seasons at Juventus; 78 were scored in Serie A in 141 appearances. In 1995, Baggio was nominated for the Ballon d'Or and placed fifth in the 1995 FIFA World Player of the Year Award. He was also awarded the 1995 Onze d'Argent Award, behind George Weah. Baggio is currently Juventus' ninth-highest goalscorer in all competitions, and is the joint tenth-highest goalscorer for Juventus in Serie A, alongside Pietro Anastasi. He is the sixth-highest Juventus goalscorer in the Coppa Italia with 14 goals, and is also the joint fourth all-time Juventus goalscorer in European competitions, as well as the joint fifth all-time Juventus goalscorer in international competitions, with 22 goals, alongside Anastasi once again. In 2010, he was named one of the club's 50 greatest legends.

=== 1995–1997: AC Milan ===
"Baggio on the bench? It's something that I will never understand in my lifetime."

— Zinedine Zidane on Baggio starting on the bench.

In 1995, Marcello Lippi, Roberto Bettega and Umberto Agnelli announced that Baggio no longer featured in their plans at Juventus and decided to focus on the emerging star Alessandro Del Piero, who would inherit Baggio's number 10 shirt. Baggio faced difficulties with Agnelli, Luciano Moggi, and Juventus management during his final season, as they stated they would only renew his contract if he reduced his salary by 50%. After strong pressure from AC Milan chairman Silvio Berlusconi and manager Fabio Capello, Baggio was sold to the Milanese club for £6.8 million, amidst several protests from Juventus fans. At the time, Baggio had been linked with Inter Milan, Real Madrid, and English Premier League clubs Manchester United and Blackburn Rovers.

Although Baggio initially struggled with injuries at the beginning of his first season with Milan, he came back into the starting line-up and was appointed the main penalty taker. He helped Milan win the Serie A title, notably scoring a goal against his former team Fiorentina from a penalty in the title-deciding match. Baggio finished the season with 10 goals in all competitions, in 34 appearances; seven of his goals were scored in Serie A, in 28 appearances, and he also provided 12 assists in Serie A, making him the top assist provider of the season. He became one of only six players to win the scudetto in consecutive years with different teams, and was voted the club's best player of the season by the fans, despite playing a more creative role. Towards the end of the season, Baggio had disagreements with Capello due to limited playing time, as Capello believed he was no longer fit enough to play for 90 minutes; although Baggio frequently started matches, he was often substituted during the second half; during the course of the season, he only played nine matches in their entirety, being substituted on 17 occasions, and coming off the bench twice.

During the opening of the 1996–97 Serie A under new Milan manager Óscar Tabárez, Baggio was initially left out of the first team, with the former commenting "[t]here is no place for poets in modern football." Baggio was later able to convince the Uruguayan manager of his abilities and earn himself a spot in the starting line-up; he became the focal point of the team's offensive play, and was initially started in his preferred role behind George Weah, and on occasion as a left-winger or as a central-midfielder playmaker. After a series of disappointing results, Baggio was relegated to the bench, and Milan's former coach Arrigo Sacchi, also the former Italy manager with whom Baggio had argued following the 1994 World Cup, was called in as a replacement. Although their relationship initially improved, Sacchi gave Baggio limited playing time, and he soon fell out of form, along with the rest of the squad, which caused their relationship to deteriorate again. Milan failed to retain their league title, finishing the season in a disappointing 11th place, and they were knocked out once again in the quarter-finals of the Coppa Italia. Baggio made his UEFA Champions League debut in the 1996–97 season, scoring his first goal in the competition, although Milan were eliminated in the group stage. Milan also lost the 1996 Supercoppa Italiana to Fiorentina, as Baggio was left on the bench. During his time at Milan, Baggio scored 19 goals in 67 appearances in all competitions; 12 of his goals were scored in Serie A, in 51 appearances, 3 were scored in the Coppa Italia in 6 appearances, and 4 were scored in European competitions, in 10 appearances.

=== 1997–1998: Bologna ===
"I said, 'No, you have to play striker.' Baggio went to another club. That year Baggio scored 25 [actually 22] goals – for Bologna! I lost 25 goals! Big mistake."

— Carlo Ancelotti talking to Simon Kuper of the Financial Times in 2014, reminiscing his greatest regret in football, choosing a system over a generational talent.

In 1997, Capello returned to Milan, subsequently stating Baggio was not a part of his plans with the club. Baggio chose to move to Parma, but the manager at the time, Carlo Ancelotti, impeded the transfer, as he also did not feel Baggio would fit into his tactical plans. Ancelotti would later state he regretted this decision, stating that in his naïveté, he believed that the 4–4–2 formation was the ideal formation for success, and he felt that at the time, creative players such as Gianfranco Zola and Baggio were not compatible with this system.

Baggio subsequently transferred to Bologna, aiming to save the squad from relegation, and earn a place at the 1998 FIFA World Cup. Baggio refound his form with the club and had a dominant season, scoring a personal best of 22 goals in Serie A, as well as providing 9 assists, leading Bologna to an eighth-place finish, allowing them to qualify for the UEFA Intertoto Cup. Baggio was the highest scoring Italian in Serie A that season, and the third-highest goalscorer in Serie A. His performances earned him a place in Italy's 1998 World Cup squad. Baggio also led Bologna to the round of 16 in the Coppa Italia, where he scored one goal in three appearances. Although he rose to hero status amongst the fans, he had difficulties with his manager Renzo Ulivieri, in particular when he was left out of the starting 11 against Juventus. Ulivieri later denied ever having any difficulties with Baggio. At the beginning of the season, Baggio cut off his iconic ponytail, signifying his rebirth. Baggio was named as Bologna's captain for part of the season, before handing the armband to Giancarlo Marocchi. Baggio made his 300th Serie A appearance while at Bologna, in a 0–0 draw against Empoli on 11 January 1998. Baggio received nominations for both the Ballon d'Or and the FIFA World Player of the Year due to his performances for Bologna and Italy that season. He was also nominated for the 1998 Serie A Italian Footballer of the Year and Serie A Footballer of the Year awards, losing out to Alessandro Del Piero and Ronaldo, respectively.

=== 1998–2000: Inter Milan ===
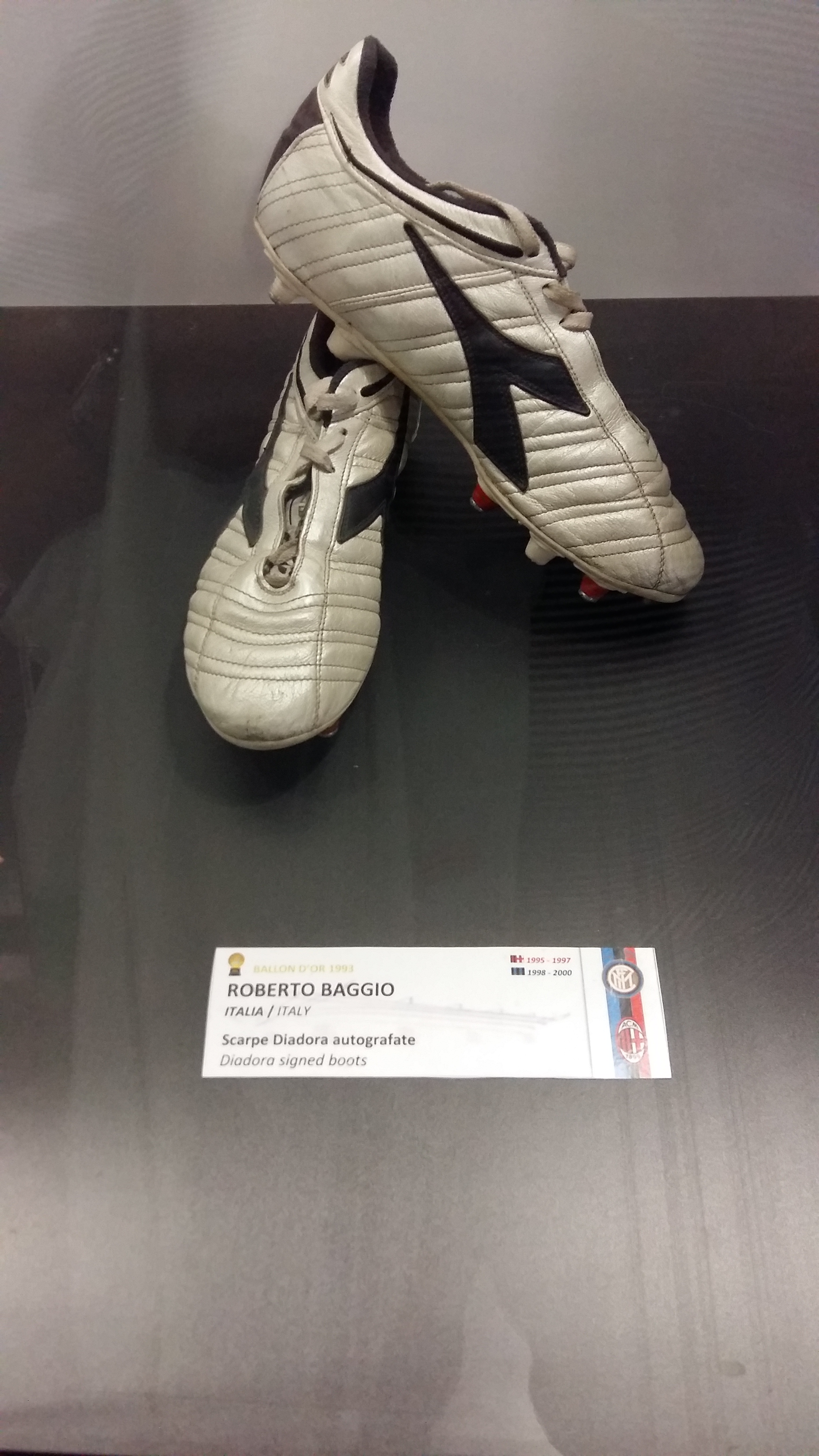
Baggio's Diadora boots in the San Siro museum, home of Inter and AC Milan

After the 1998 World Cup, Baggio signed with his favourite childhood club Inter Milan in order to compete in the UEFA Champions League. He made his club debut on 12 August 1998, in the first leg of the second round of the qualifying stages of the latter competition, scoring a goal and providing three assists in a 4–0 win over Skonto FC in Pisa. After injuries, disappointing results, and several managerial changes throughout the season, including Luigi Simoni, Mircea Lucescu, and Roy Hodgson, Baggio struggled to gain playing time, and was used out of position as a winger, often as a substitute. Baggio scored five league goals and provided 10 assists in 23 appearances during the 1998–99 season, as Inter finished in eighth place, missing out on a European spot. He helped Inter to a Coppa Italia semi-final, losing out to eventual winners Parma. Baggio scored a goal against his former club Bologna in a European play-off match, but Inter lost both matches, failing to qualify for the UEFA Cup. Baggio also scored four goals in the Champions League, helping lead Inter through the qualifying rounds to the quarter-finals, where they were eliminated by eventual winners Manchester United, also scoring a memorable brace against defending champions Real Madrid in the group stage.

In the 1999–2000 season, Marcello Lippi, Baggio's former manager at Juventus, was appointed as Inter's new coach. Lippi did not favour Baggio and left him out of the squad for most of the season, stating Baggio was out of shape. In his autobiography, Baggio stated Lippi had dumped him after Baggio refused to point out which of Inter's players had expressed negative opinions about the coach, also highlighting an incident during a training session where he called out Christian Vieri and Christian Panucci for applauding Baggio for a notable assist.

Baggio was used scarcely and often as a substitute, scoring 4 goals in 18 appearances during the regular Serie A season. He made five appearances in the Coppa Italia, with his only goal coming against local rivals AC Milan in the second leg of the quarter-finals, as he helped Inter reach the final, only to be defeated by Lazio. Despite his limited playing time, Baggio still managed several important goals to help Inter to a fourth-place finish, alongside Parma, such as his match winning goal against Hellas Verona, which he scored after coming off the bench, after being excluded from the team since 18 December 1999. Baggio had also previously helped to set up Inter's equaliser during the match. This was the first time Baggio had scored for Inter since his goal on 27 May of the previous season, and in the post-match the interview, he denied accusations made by Lippi in regard to his personal form.

Baggio's last important contribution to Inter was scoring two memorable goals against Parma in the play-off match for the last remaining Champions League place, which Inter won 3–1; Lippi had been forced to field Baggio due to several injuries. Baggio was given a perfect 10 rating from the Italian sports newspaper La Gazzetta dello Sport, which described his performance as "absolutely perfect all game". This match is considered an example of professionalism shown by Baggio, as Inter president Massimo Moratti had stated Lippi would only stay on if the team qualified for the Champions League.

=== 2000–2004: Brescia ===
"Roberto Baggio was the best Italian fantasista; he was better than Meazza and Boniperti, and he was amongst the greatest of all time, right behind Maradona, Pelé, and maybe Cruyff. Without the injury problems and the difficulties with his knees, he would have been the very best player in history."

— Carlo Mazzone, Baggio's coach at Brescia.

After two years with Inter, Baggio decided not to renew his expiring contract due to his conflicts with Marcello Lippi, making him a free agent at age 33. He was linked with several Serie A clubs, such as Napoli and Reggina, and also various Premier League and La Liga clubs, including Barcelona. Baggio ultimately transferred to Serie A newcomers Brescia under head coach Carlo Mazzone, aiming to save them from relegation; he remained in Italy in order to have a greater opportunity of being called up for the 2002 World Cup. He was made captain and was given the number 10 shirt, playing as an attacking midfielder.

Despite injury problems during the first half of the season, Baggio re-found his form and managed ten goals and ten assists in the 2000–01 season. Brescia finished in a joint seventh place, their best Serie A finish since the league's re-establishment in 1946, and qualified for the UEFA Intertoto Cup, also reaching the quarter-finals of the Coppa Italia, losing to eventual winners Fiorentina. Baggio helped Brescia to the final of the 2001 UEFA Intertoto Cup, where they were defeated by Paris Saint-Germain on away goals. Baggio scored one goal in the tournament, in the final from a penalty. His performances earned him a nomination for the 2001 Ballon d'Or, and he finished 25th overall in the rankings. Baggio was one of the best offensive playmakers in the league, winning the Guerin d'oro Award in 2001, awarded by the Italian sports magazine Guerin Sportivo, to the player with the highest average rating throughout the season with at least 19 appearances.

At the start of 2001–02 season, Baggio scored eight goals in the first nine matches, leading him to the top of the Serie A goalscoring table. In his eighth league appearance of the season, against Piacenza, Baggio scored a goal but later suffered an injury. A week later, against Venezia, he scored from a penalty, but he endured a more serious injury following a hard challenge which caused him to tear the ACL of his left knee, keeping him out of action for four months. He suffered a second serious injury that season, tearing the meniscus in his left knee, after returning to the team, and coming off the bench, in the Coppa Italia semi-final against Parma on 31 January 2002. He was operated on 4 February 2002 and he returned for three matches before the end of the season, making a recovery in 76 days. On 21 April 2002, in the first game after his comeback, Baggio came on as a substitute to score two goals against Fiorentina, helping Brescia win the match. He scored again against Bologna, saving Brescia from relegation on the final matchday, and bringing his seasonal tally to 11 goals in 12 Serie A matches. Despite Baggio's performances and public demand, Italy national team head coach Giovanni Trapattoni did not deem him fully fit, prompting the coach to leave Baggio out of the final squad for the 2002 World Cup. Trapattoni also expressed concern about bringing Baggio to the World Cup due to the presence of Francesco Totti and Alessandro Del Piero in his role, believing that this could create a rivalry between the players. After missing out on the tournament, Baggio reversed his initial decision to retire after the World Cup, expressing his intention to surpass the 200 Serie A goal mark.

Baggio maintained a high level of performance under new coach Gianni De Biasi. Baggio managed 12 goals and 9 assists during the 2002–03 season, helping Brescia to an eighth-place finish and another UEFA Intertoto Cup spot. He scored his 300th career goal from a penalty on 15 December 2002, in Brescia's 3–1 home victory over Perugia, also setting-up one of Igli Tare's goals.

In the 2003–04 season, the final season of his career, Baggio recorded 12 goals and 11 assists. He scored his 200th goal in Serie A in a 2–2 draw against Parma on 14 March 2004, saving Brescia from relegation, as they finished the season in 11th place. Baggio was the first player in almost 30 years to surpass the 200-goal milestone, and is currently only one of seven players to have accomplished the feat. Baggio scored his final and 205th Serie A career goal on the second last matchday, in a 2–1 home win over Coppa Italia winners Lazio on 9 May 2004; he also set up Brescia's first goal in that match. Baggio played his last career match on 16 May 2004 on the final matchday of the season at the San Siro against Milan, which ended in a 4–2 loss to the Serie A champions; during the game, he set-up Matuzalém's second goal. In the 88th minute, De Biasi substituted Baggio, prompting the 80,000 present at the San Siro to give him a standing ovation; Milan's captain, defender Paolo Maldini, who was Baggio's former teammate both with the Italy national team and Milan, also embraced him before he left the pitch.

With Brescia, Baggio scored 46 goals in 101 appearances in all competitions, scoring 45 goals in 95 Serie A appearances, and one goal in two European matches. Baggio also made four Coppa Italia appearances with Brescia. Baggio retired as Brescia's all-time leading goalscorer in Serie A. He ended his career with 205 goals in Serie A, making him the seventh-highest scorer of all time, behind Silvio Piola, Francesco Totti (who overtook him in 2011), Gunnar Nordahl, Giuseppe Meazza, José Altafini, and Antonio Di Natale (who overtook him in 2015). Baggio's number 10 shirt was retired by Brescia in his honour, and he is considered the club's greatest ever player. Before Baggio had joined Brescia, they had never been able to avoid relegation after being newly promoted to Serie A, in over 40 years. During the four years under Baggio, Brescia recorded their best ever Serie A run and were never relegated.

== International career ==
=== Youth career and senior debut ===
Baggio totalled 27 goals in 56 caps for his national team at senior level, making him Italy's fourth-highest all-time goalscorer, tied with Del Piero, who managed the tally in 91 appearances. At youth level, he was capped for the Italy U16 on four occasions in 1984, scoring three goals. Under Cesare Maldini, he was called up for one Italy under-21 match against Switzerland on 16 October 1987, although he was an unused substitute, and strangely failed to make an appearance for the azzurrini.

His first senior International call-up was given to him by manager Azeglio Vicini, and he made his first appearance for Italy on 16 November 1988 at age 21 in a 1–0 friendly victory over the Netherlands, assisting Gianluca Vialli's match-winning goal. He scored his first goal for Italy on 22 April 1989, from a free-kick in a 1–1 draw against Uruguay in an international friendly in Verona. Later that year, in his following international appearance in Italy's friendly against Bulgaria, held in Cesena on 20 September, he scored his first brace for Italy in a 4–0 victory, (Note: Baggio's first goal of the match, which came from the penalty spot, was Italy's 500th goal in home matches.) also later assisting Andrea Carnevale's goal with a cross from a free kick, and contributing to Nikolay Iliev's own goal by setting-up Vialli, whose shot was subsequently deflected by the Bulgarian defender.

=== 1990 FIFA World Cup ===
"Baggio. Oh yes, oh yes…oh yes! What a goal by Baggio! That's the goal they've all been waiting for!"

— ITV Commentator Alan Parry's reaction to Baggio's goal in Italy's group stage match against Czechoslovakia, during the 1990 World Cup.

Baggio was called up for his first World Cup tournament in 1990, on home soil. Baggio appeared in five matches, starting in four of them, as Italy manager Azeglio Vicini preferred the more experienced Gianluca Vialli to start against Argentina. Baggio was still able to display his ability throughout the tournament, and Vicini's decision not to use him more frequently was later criticised, as Baggio's creative combinations with Salvatore Schillaci were praised. Baggio scored twice during the tournament, including the "goal of the tournament" in a 2–0 win in his first competitive international fixture, in Italy's final group match against Czechoslovakia. The goal, which drew him comparisons with Giuseppe Meazza, involved an exchange with Giuseppe Giannini on the left wing, followed by a dribbling run from midfield, in which Baggio beat several players, wrong-footing the last defender with a feint, before putting the ball past the goalkeeper. This goal was later recognised as the seventh-best goal in World Cup history in a FIFA poll.

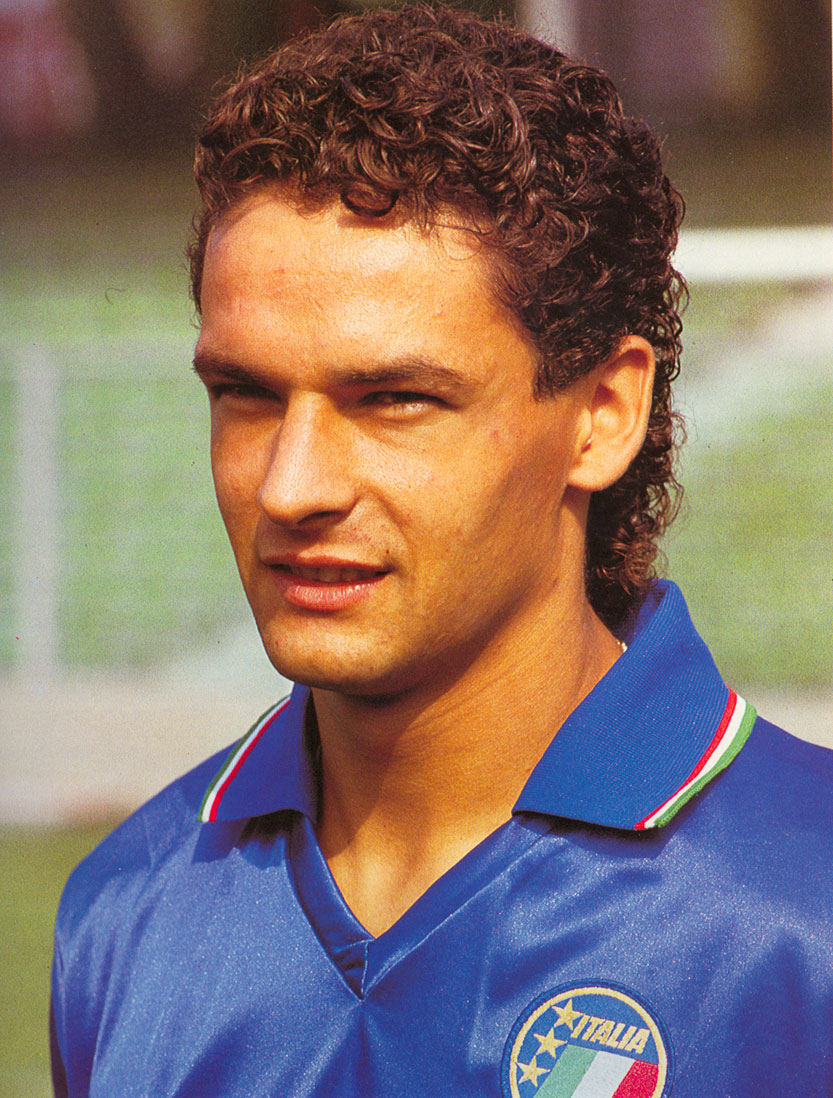
Baggio with Italy in 1990

In the round of 16 match against Uruguay, which Italy won 2–0, Baggio started the play which led to Italy's first goal, scored by Schillaci. Baggio also scored a goal from a direct free-kick, but it was disallowed as the referee had awarded an indirect free-kick. Baggio also had a goal incorrectly ruled offside in the quarter-final against the Republic of Ireland, which Italy won 1–0; Baggio was once again involved in the build-up which led to Schillaci's match winning goal. Italy were eliminated on penalties against defending champions Argentina in the semi-finals after a 1–1 draw, although Baggio was able to score his penalty in the shootout. Baggio had come off the bench in the second half for Giannini, and came close to winning the match with a free-kick, but it was saved by Sergio Goycochea.

In the bronze medal match against England, Baggio returned to the starting line-up, playing behind Schillaci. He scored Italy's first goal of the match after stealing the ball from Peter Shilton. David Platt momentarily equalised, but with five minutes left on the clock, Baggio set up Schillaci, who was fouled inside the area by Paul Parker. Although Baggio was the regularly designated penalty taker for his national team, he stepped aside to allow Schillaci to score and capture the Golden Shoe, a gesture which was praised by the Italian media. Baggio assisted a goal by Nicola Berti in the dying minutes of the match, but it was incorrectly ruled offside. Italy won the match 2–1, capturing the third place medal.

Following the World Cup, Baggio was not called up often by Vicini for the Euro 1992 Qualification matches, only making three appearances and scoring two goals as Italy failed to qualify for the tournament, finishing second in their qualifying group behind the Soviet Union.

=== 1994 FIFA World Cup ===
Under Italy's new manager, Arrigo Sacchi, Baggio was his team's top scorer during their qualifying campaign for the 1994 World Cup, scoring five goals of the team's 14 goals in the eight games in also providing seven assists. He helped Italy top their group and qualify for the 1994 World Cup, notably contributing to Dino Baggio's winner in the decisive final group match against Portugal, which secured Italy's place in the final competition. One of his best performances during the qualifying campaign occurred on 14 October 1992 against Switzerland; Italy were trailing 2–0 at home and Baggio led his team to a 2–2 draw comeback, scoring a goal. Under Sacchi, Baggio made his first and only starting appearance as Italy's captain in the 1994 World Cup qualifying match in Glasgow against Scotland on 18 November 1992. However, he was substituted off in the final minutes of the 0–0 draw after injuring his rib.

Despite a series of injuries prior to the tournament, Baggio was expected to be one of the stars of the 1994 World Cup, entering the competition as the reigning Ballon d'Or winner and FIFA World Player of the Year, and at the peak of his career; after a lacklustre start, he led his team to the final with three match winning performances in the knockout rounds, wearing the number 10 shirt, and scoring five goals in the process. In a disappointing first match against Republic of Ireland at Giants Stadium, New Jersey, Italy were defeated 1–0. In the second match against Norway, he appeared more inspired; however, Italy goalkeeper Gianluca Pagliuca was sent off for handling the ball outside the area. Luca Marchegiani was brought in to replace him, and Arrigo Sacchi decided to sacrifice Baggio in what produced an outcry amidst the fans. Baggio later stated that Sacchi was "crazy". Italy won the match 1–0. Italy continued to disappoint, as their final group match ended in a 1–1 draw against Mexico, and he again failed to influence the result. The Italians finished third in their group, drawing much criticism from the press, and only advancing from the first round as the fourth-best third-placed team; Juventus president Gianni Agnelli famously called Baggio un coniglio bagnato ("a wet rabbit"), referring to his despondent demeanour, hoping the jab would spur him on to score.

After under-performing during the group stage, Baggio refound his form in the knockout stages, where he scored five memorable goals. He scored two in the round of 16, helping a ten-man Italy defeat Nigeria 2–1 at Foxboro Stadium in Boston, after trailing for most of the match. He scored his first goal of the match with two minutes left on the clock, after receiving ball at the edge of the area from Roberto Mussi. He then went on to score the winning goal from a penalty in extra time after setting up Antonio Benarrivo with a lobbed pass, who was then fouled in the penalty area.

Baggio scored another match-winning goal in the quarter-finals to defeat Spain 2–1 with three minutes remaining. After receiving the ball from Giuseppe Signori, he dribbled past the Spanish goalkeeper Andoni Zubizarreta, scoring off-balance from a tight angle. He was also involved in the build-up which led to Italy's first goal by his unrelated namesake Dino Baggio. Baggio gave a man of the match performance in the semi-finals; he scored two more goals to beat Bulgaria 2–1 at Giants Stadium, leading Italy to the World Cup final for the first time in 12 years. He scored his first goal after beating two players and curling the ball from outside the area into the bottom-right corner. His second was scored with a half volley from a tight angle, assisted by Demetrio Albertini with a lobbed ball.

"I knew what I had to do and my concentration was perfect. But I was so tired that I tried to hit the ball too hard."

— Baggio on his physical and mental state before taking the penalty in the final.

Baggio was not fully fit for the final against Brazil at the Rose Bowl in Pasadena, California, after pulling his hamstring during the semi-final and playing with the aid of a painkiller injection. Despite being far less dominant than in previous matches, he still tested Brazilian goalkeeper Cláudio Taffarel and was able to set up a few chances for his teammates. The match ended 0–0 after extra time; he took Italy's last penalty in the resulting shootout, but he put the decisive spot-kick over the crossbar, which meant the Brazilians won the title, resulting in one of the most upsetting moments in World Cup history, and a miss with which his career would frequently become associated.

Immediately after the match, Baggio stated that he was "very disappointed," also noting that "a shock of pain" went through his leg as he kicked. Reportedly, Baggio stood near the goal alone for 8 minutes with his head down after missing the penalty, which has given him the moniker "The Man who Died Standing" Baggio has since described the miss as the worst moment of his career, stating that it affected him for years, and that he still "dreams" about it to this day. In his autobiography, when recounting the miss, he later reflected: "Penalties are only missed by those who have the courage to take them." Before him, two other Italians, Franco Baresi and Daniele Massaro, had already missed penalties. Having led Italy to the final with his memorable performances, Baggio received the Silver Ball as the second-best player of the tournament, behind Romário, and also finished tied for second in goals scored throughout the tournament, although he missed out on the Bronze Boot, which went to Kennet Andersson and Romário. He was also named in the World Cup All-Star Team. Baggio finished runner-up for the Ballon d'Or, with 136 points from a possible 245, and third place for the FIFA World Player of the Year in 1994.

Despite Baggio's association with missing the decisive penalty in the 1994 World Cup final shoot-out, former Telelatino broadcaster Alf De Blasis stated in 2010 that he believed that Baggio's performance throughout the entire tournament cemented his legacy as a footballer. Reflecting on Baggio's performance at the 1994 World Cup in 2001, Stefano Bozzi of BBC Sport stated: "At the USA 94 World Cup, [Baggio] single-handedly hauled Italy to the final." In 2006, the BBC described him as "Italy's best player throughout the [1994] tournament." In 2017, Emmet Gates instead described Baggio's run-up to the 1994 World Cup final with Italy as "the greatest show of individual excellence since another equally majestic number ten [Maradona] dominated the 1986 tournament." When summarising Baggio's 1994 World Cup in 2018, Ed Dove of ESPN FC stated that "'[t]he Divine Ponytail' had arguably been the outstanding player of the tournament, bailing Italy out on numerous occasions, but his inspirational touch deserted him when it mattered most." His colleague Nick Miller instead stated that "Roberto Baggio was the best player at the 1994 World Cup, dragging Italy to the final virtually on his own."

=== Post-World Cup ===
After the 1994 World Cup, Italy head coach Arrigo Sacchi and Baggio fell out. Their relationship deteriorated in September 1994 following a 1–1 draw against Slovenia in a Euro 1996 qualifying match, where Baggio was benched. After a 2–1 defeat to Croatia in a Euro 1996 qualifying match in November, their relationship hit the breaking point, and Baggio, supported by his teammates, asked for the manager's dismissal. Due to his disagreements with Sacchi, Baggio was called up to the national team less frequently, only making one more substitute appearance in a 1–0 home win against Slovenia in a Euro 1996 qualifier in September 1995. He eventually lost his spot in the squad, missing out on Italy's Euro 1996 squad, despite winning the scudetto that year with Milan. Sacchi justified his decision by stating Baggio was not fully fit, and that Enrico Chiesa helped the team more when possession was lost. Italy were eliminated in the group stage of the competition. Baggio was also excluded from Cesare Maldini's Italian Olympic squad in 1996.

=== 1998 FIFA World Cup ===
After a lengthy absence from the national team, Baggio was called up by Cesare Maldini for a World Cup qualifying match against Poland on 30 April 1997, in Naples; Baggio came off the bench and scored a goal in a 3–0 win. He was subsequently selected as one of Italy's 22 players for the 1998 World Cup following his performances with Bologna.

"I had the image of my miss from four years ago stuck in my mind. I was stepping up to the penalty spot and I thought to myself: 'Just hit it hard, hit it hard...'

— Baggio on his penalty against Chile in the 1998 World Cup.

In Italy's opening match of the 1998 World Cup in France, against Chile, Baggio started alongside Christian Vieri, playing all 90 minutes, as Alessandro Del Piero was still recovering from an injury. Vieri opened the scoring from a Baggio assist, but Chile managed to equalise and take the lead through Marcelo Salas. Baggio created several chances, but Italy were unable to equalise. Towards the end of the match, Baggio played a low cross into the box which unintentionally touched Chilean defender Ronald Fuentes's hand at the edge of the penalty area, resulting in a fortunate penalty for Italy. Despite missing the decisive penalty in the 1994 World Cup final shootout, Baggio stepped up to take the penalty, and he scored Italy's equalising goal, becoming the first Italian player to score in three World Cups. This was the first penalty he had taken for Italy since the 1994 World Cup final miss; Baggio described the goal as "liberating".

In Italy's 3–0 second group match win over Cameroon, Baggio assisted Luigi Di Biagio's opening goal with a cross following a corner; however, he was replaced by Del Piero during the second half after sustaining a minor injury. Baggio scored his second goal of the tournament in Italy's final group match against Austria, which ended in a 2–1 win to Italy. Baggio came on during the second half, replacing Del Piero, after the crowd had begun to chant his name. He scored the winning goal of the match, after combining with Francesco Moriero and Filippo Inzaghi, as Italy topped their group. With this goal, he tied Paolo Rossi's record for most goals by an Italian player in the World Cup finals, with nine; this was also his 27th and final goal for Italy. He was left on the bench for the round of 16 win over Norway as Italy advanced to the quarter-finals.

In the quarter-final match against eventual champions France, Baggio came on as a substitute for Del Piero in the second half, and managed to create some scoring opportunities. The score remained 0–0, and the match went to extra time, although Baggio came the closest to scoring the golden goal, with a volley from a lobbed pass by Albertini, but his shot was put just wide of Fabien Barthez's far post. The match eventually went to a penalty shootout. Although Baggio converted his penalty Italy's first, the shootout was won by the host nation and Italy was eliminated from a World Cup on penalties for the third consecutive time. Italy's coach was criticised for starting the recovering Del Piero ahead of Baggio, and for not allowing the two players to play alongside each other. Despite rumours that the substitutions had created a rivalry between the players, Baggio and Del Piero remain friends. In 2008, Baggio stated that he has great respect for Del Piero, and that there had never been disagreements between them. In turn, Del Piero expressed his admiration for Baggio in 2011.

=== Later career ===
Baggio was initially a regular squad member under Dino Zoff, appearing as a substitute in two UEFA Euro 2000 qualifying matches, and in a 2–0 win against Wales in 1998, setting up a goal for Vieri; and in a 1–1 draw against Belarus in 1999. Baggio made a starting appearance in a 0–0 friendly draw against Norway in 1999, creating several chances, helping to set-up a goal which was ruled offside, and hitting the post from a free-kick. However, he was later dropped from the squad after Inter's poor 1998–99 season, and he was not called up for UEFA Euro 2000 due to his limited playing time during the 1999–2000 season, and accusations made against his fitness. Zoff centred his squad around younger offensive players, such as Francesco Totti, Alessandro Del Piero, Stefano Fiore, Marco Delvecchio, Filippo Inzaghi and Vincenzo Montella. Baggio was voted Italy's Player of the Century in 2000.

Baggio was controversially excluded from Italy's 2002 World Cup squad by coach Giovanni Trapattoni, who believed him to not have fully recovered from the serious injury he had sustained during the season. Although he was initially keen to include Baggio in the final 23-man list, he ultimately excluded him from the squad; Baggio had made a direct appeal to him prior to the tournament by writing him a letter. Fans and pundits criticised the omission, as Italy were eliminated by co-hosts South Korea in the round of 16.

Many fans hoped to see him play for Italy at Euro 2004, or with the 2004 Olympic squad that eventually managed a bronze medal, but this was not to be the case. However, he was given an international send-off by Trapattoni at age 37 in a friendly match against Spain on 28 April 2004, in which he wore the number 10 shirt for the final time, as well as the captain's armband for part of the match. Although Baggio entertained the crowd with his creativity and skill, he was unable to score, despite winning a free-kick from which Vieri's equalising goal arose. The match finished 1–1 and Baggio was given a standing ovation after being substituted off for Fabrizio Miccoli. This was Baggio's 56th and final match for Italy, and it was the first time an Italian footballer's career had been celebrated this way since Silvio Piola retired.

Baggio is the only Italian player ever to score in three World Cups with nine career World Cup goals, putting him equal with Christian Vieri and Paolo Rossi as Italy's top World Cup goalscorers. Despite his performances for Italy in the 1990, 1994, and 1998 World Cups, he never played for Italy in the UEFA European Championships, and is currently the Italian player with the most caps without playing in a European Championship.

== Player profile ==
=== Style of play ===
"He's without doubt the most skilful number ten in the modern game, the archetypal playmaker, if you like, who can create chances and score goals."

— Brian Laudrup on Baggio, 1995.

Described as a fantasista, trequartista, mezzapunta, or rifinitore throughout his career in the Italian media, due to his role on the pitch and creative playing style, Baggio was a world class playmaker with an eye for goal, who was renowned for his vision, creativity, ability to read the game, crossing accuracy, and passing ability, which made him an excellent assist provider; (Note: See) however, he usually played as a second striker throughout his career, as he was known for scoring goals as well as creating them. (Note: See) This led Michel Platini to describe him as a "9 and a half", namely a player whose role lay half-way between that of a forward and a midfielder, as he was not a true number 9 (the shirt number usually associated with a striker), due to his creative ability, but he scored more than a number 10 (the shirt number commonly associated with an advanced playmaker), a description which often saw him identified with the role of an inside forward. He also stated that Baggio's playing style coincided with the re-emergence of the attacking midfielder in Italy during the early 2000s; indeed, he served as an inspiration to many future players.

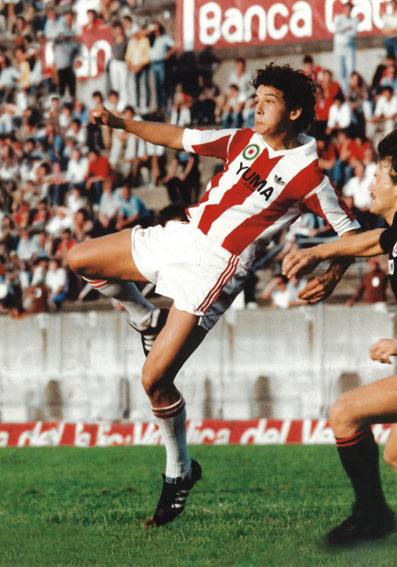
A young Baggio with Vicenza

Baggio was a tactically versatile player, with a good understanding of the game, and was comfortable attacking on either flank or through the centre of the pitch; this allowed him to operate anywhere along the front-line. His preferred position was in a free playmaking role behind the forwards, as a creative attacking midfielder, although he was rarely deployed in this position throughout his career due to the prevalence of the 4–4–2 formation, in which he usually functioned either as a main striker, or more frequently in a supporting role as a deep-lying forward. It was only in later years that he was able to play in this free role more frequently. He was also occasionally deployed out of position as a left winger in an attacking trident, as a wide midfielder, or even in central midfield as a mezzala or deep-lying playmaker on rarer instances. During the lead-up to the 1994 World Cup, he was also initially employed by Italy's manager Arrigo Sacchi as a centre-forward, in a role known in Italian football jargon as centravanti di manovra (which literally translates to "manoeuvring centre-forward"), which was a precursor to the modern false-nine role; in this position, Baggio was expected to link-up with other players and create chances for them, in addition to creating space with his movement by dropping deep into midfield, and allowing the team's wingers to cut inside and make attacking runs into the centre.

A prolific goalscorer, Baggio was an accurate finisher from both inside and outside the area, and was known for his accurate bending shots and composure in front of goal, rather than his power. Due to his excellent technique, he was a precise volleyer, and he had a penchant for scoring from chip shots. Moreover, he was also a set piece specialist, who was highly regarded for his ball delivery from dead-ball situations, as well as his precision from direct free-kicks and his ability to curl the ball, which earned him a reputation as one of the best free kick takers of his generation. (Note: See) His free-kick technique influenced several other players who came to be renowned for their prowess from dead-ball situations, such as Alessandro Del Piero and Andrea Pirlo. During his time with Juventus, his free kick technique was described as a cross between that of Maradona's, Zico's, and Platini's, as at the time, his ball-striking technique was thought to resemble Platini's, although, like Zico and Maradona, he preferred to take free kicks from close range, usually from a distance of around 20 to 16 metres from the goal, or even just outside the area, and to have the ball touched by a teammate first before striking it. Despite his decisive miss in the 1994 World Cup final shootout, Baggio was also a penalty kick specialist.

Although naturally right-footed, Baggio was comfortable using either foot, and often began dribbling with his left foot. Not particularly imposing physically, or in the air, due to his diminutive stature and slender physique, he was known however for his pace and acceleration over short distances, which, along with his movement, positioning, anticipation, technical ability, quick feet, low centre of gravity, and resulting agility, allowed him to lose his markers when making offensive runs into the area, both on and off the ball. Regarded as one of the greatest dribblers ever, and as one of the most technically accomplished players of all time, (Note: See) Baggio possessed an excellent first touch, and was renowned for his skilful dribbling, ball control and balance, as well as his spatial awareness, speed of thought and execution, reactions, close control at speed, and ability to beat opponents with flair, tricks, body feints, or sudden changes of pace or direction, both in one-on-one situations, or during individual dribbling runs. (Note: See) Zico once described Baggio as "technically flawless," while Gianluigi Buffon, in his 2008 autobiography Numero 1, described Baggio as the "most technical player" with whom he had ever shared a pitch, adding that his touch and ball control were "unique". In 2004, Sacchi stated: "Baggio is creativity, flair, unpredictability, intuition, harmony." In 2016, Rob Smyth of The Guardian praised Baggio for his "instinctive intelligence", when commenting on his playing style, also describing him as a "conductor" on the pitch "who knew when and how to change the tempo of an attack".

=== Reception ===
Considered by pundits to be a highly promising prospect in his youth, Baggio later established himself as one of the best players of his generation, and as one of Italy's greatest players ever; Baggio is regarded by many in the sport, including his former Milan manager Fabio Capello, as the best Italian footballer of all time, (Note: See) and by many in the sport, as one of the greatest players in the history of the game. Italian journalist Gianni Brera, who had observed both Giuseppe Meazza and Gianni Rivera, stated that Baggio was the best Italian player he had ever seen. During his time at Juventus, the club's former chairman, Gianni Agnelli, referred to Baggio as an "artist", comparing his elegance to the painter Raffaello, while he described the emerging talent Alessandro Del Piero as Pinturicchio. In a 2011 interview with La Gazzetta dello Sport, Del Piero stated that Baggio, along with Zinedine Zidane, was the best player with whom he had ever played, a view shared by Baggio's fellow former Juventus teammate Angelo Peruzzi and his former Brescia teammate Pep Guardiola in 2010, as well as his former Inter teammate Javier Zanetti in 2020, while Matthew Le Tissier named Baggio as his best ever opponent in 2012. In 2017, Baggio's former teammate Ravanelli instead labelled Baggio as the greatest player of all time. In 1993, Giampiero Boniperti stated that he believed that Baggio was "already one of the greatest number tens ever." In 2018, Cathal Kelly of The Globe and Mail described Baggio playing in the 1994 World Cup as "the best player in the world" at the time, while The Guardian described him as "[t]he definitive player of the decade", also adding that "the 1990s belonged to Il Divin Codino", and labelled him as "probably the finest player in the world between 1992 and 1995." In 2015, Les Carpenter of The Guardian described Baggio as "perhaps the greatest player of his time," while his colleague Emmet Gates dubbed him "the best player of his generation." In 2010, Marco Gori of TuttoMercatoWeb labelled Baggio as "one of the best footballers in history." Throughout his career, pundit Gianni Brera compared his playing style to that of Italian former footballer Giuseppe Meazza, while manager Trapattoni instead compared Baggio's technical characteristics to other former number 10s such as Zico, Platini, and Juan Alberto Schiaffino.

In 2017, Baggio received praise from numerous sporting figures and pundits ahead of his 50th birthday, with Stefano Edel of La Gazzetta di Mantova describing Baggio as "the Italian Maradona", and echoing Sacchi's words prior to the 1994 World Cup, when he compared Baggio's importance to Italy with that of Maradona to Argentina. Zico described him as "one of the best players in the history of Italian football", while Tommaso Pellizzari of Il Corriere della Sera called him "the greatest pure talent of Italian football." James McHie of Calciomercato.com instead named him as Italy's greatest player, calling him "the greatest player [...] to pull on the Azzurri shirt", a view shared by Stefano Discreti of Mediaset, who called Baggio "the best Italian footballer of all time" in 2019. Also in 2017, Giuseppe Bergomi described Baggio as "extraordinary" and as a "pure talent", who was "devastating when he played because he was capable of deciding games on his own." In 2004, Gianni Rivera described him as "one of the greatest Italian footballers ever." In 2019, Marco Gentile of Il Giornale described Baggio as "one of the best Italian [...] players in the history of football", and also as "one of the best players in the history of world football." In 2020, Luca Stamerra of Eurosport described him as one of the "best number 10s in the history of this sport." In 2019, his former Italy manager Dino Zoff listed Baggio as one of the best players he ever coached, while his former Fiorentina manager Sven-Göran Eriksson named him as the most talented player he had ever coached alongside Wayne Rooney in 2021, commenting: "He had everything: incredible technique, vision, pace." In 2019, author Paolo Condò ranked Baggio among the greatest players of all time, a view shared by Emmanuel Amunike in 2020 as well as Roberto Mancini and John Keilman of the Chicago Tribune, who both described Baggio as one of the "all-time greats" in 2018 and 2019, respectively. Former RAI commentator Bruno Pizzul, who served as a pundit for the Italy national team's World Cup matches between 1986 and 2002, named Baggio as his favourite player, and as one of the best footballers he ever saw, among both Italian and non-Italian players. In 2020, Matteo Marani of La Stampa dubbed Baggio as "one of the purest expressions of talent that world football has produced".

Known for his dislike of the defensive, physical and tactical nature of Italian football in the 1990s, Baggio drew criticism from certain pundits and some of his managers for his limited defensive work-rate when possession was lost, as well as the fact that the athletic part of his game was not his main focus during training sessions in his youth, while in his later career, his physical ailments often forced him to train independently with a personal fitness coach and physiotherapist, rather than with his team; as such, Baggio's Milan manager Capello believed that he was not capable of playing for 90 minutes, due to the precarious physical condition of his knees. Luigi Simoni, one of his Inter managers, lauded Baggio for his work-rate in training, stating in 2009 that he would do up to six or seven hours of gym work a day under his tenure, a view which was also shared by Baggio's former Bologna teammate Daniele Carnasciali in 2013. Carlo Mazzone and Gianni De Biasi, his managers at Brescia, as well as his former teammates Luca Toni and Emanuele Filippini, also praised Baggio for his discipline, professionalism, and dedication in training during his time with the club, with De Biasi calling him "an example." Known to be an introvert in the media, due to his quiet private life and reluctance to give interviews, some in the sport, including Gianni Rivera, argued that Baggio lacked leadership qualities on the pitch. His personality is thought to have limited him from being more successful, in particular with larger clubs, with some pundits instead arguing that he excelled more with smaller teams; others instead believed that he had a difficult character due to his disagreements with several of his managers throughout his career, (Note: See) although he was generally regarded as a "correct" and co-operative player by officials, and as a classy and well-behaved footballer in the media. Mazzone also said of him: "Baggio was one of the greatest Italian football players of all time. But I can tell you this, he was an even greater man. He was quiet, polite, respectful, humble. He never let his great talent weigh on anyone else. He was a friend who helped me win games on a Sunday." In 1995, Fabio Capello described Baggio as a player who was "decisive." His former teammate Andrea Pirlo instead commented that "[Baggio] was a silent leader, and above all, he was a leader on the pitch. When he played for the team, he made you win the games", also later describing him as a player who "carried his teammates."

Despite his talent, success, popularity with the fans, and reputation as one of the greatest players of all time, critical reception of Baggio was occasionally divided throughout his career; this was in part due to his recurring injury struggles, as well as the fact that tactically certain managers struggled to find a suitable playing position for him. His role as a playmaker between the midfield and forward lines, as well as his skilful and creative playing style, were often regarded as being obsolete in modern football, in which managers often favoured the use of the 4–4–2 formation and a more athletic approach to the game; moreover, while Baggio was not an outright forward, he was also thought to lack the stamina to play in midfield, which made him less suited to this particular system, and occasionally led him to be excluded by his managers, although he was ultimately able to adapt to playing as a forward effectively. Baggio's unique playing position, style, and approach to the game, combined with his talent, limited work-rate, and injury struggles, led him to have both many admirers and several detractors. (Note: See) Maradona once described Baggio as "a genius" but also as "a great player who was never able to fulfil his entire potential", something with which Michel Platini concurred, while Pelé instead called him a "legend." A 1994 article on Baggio by The Independent stated: "Among professionals, [Baggio] is regarded as the best", quoting Ryan Giggs, who said: "You look to Roberto Baggio, and you realise what a good player looks like." However, the newspaper also went on to say that "Baggio's is a brittle influence. There are no half measures in his play. He is either brilliant, or he disappears, looking confused and unhappy. Since Juventus's whole pattern of play depends on him, his disappearances can be tricky. The press has interpreted his inconsistency as a lack of commitment."

In 2015, The Daily Telegraph accused him of going "missing in big games." In 2020, Daniel Story of Planet Football stated he believed that Baggio was one of the most underrated players of the past 30 years. In 2016, Luke Chandley of The Huffington Post described Baggio as "Italian football's great oxymoron", noting: "For all the skill he possessed going forward, he was the opposite of the reputation given to Italian football spanning across his whole career. Italian football was defensive know-how and structured play." His former manager Arrigo Sacchi believed that Baggio was often misused by his coaches, and that he would have been an even greater player had he been born abroad, a view which was also held by journalist Mattia Losi, who felt that Baggio would have been more appreciated had he been born in Brazil or Argentina, rather than in a country with a football legacy like Italy's, which often failed to recognise young local talent, and Emmet Gates, who said in 2013 that "Baggio unfortunately was born in the wrong country, or rather, he was born in Italy at the wrong time." Regarding this contrast and Baggio's overall career, Tim Collings of The Guardian described him as "Italy's greatest player of fantasia" in 2004 but also wrote:

Baggio's record, as a player for club and country, fails to match his reputation. He is less known for his acts of great success than for his injuries, his misfortunes and his courage; he is an artist in sport whose work is appreciated but no longer used in modern currency. Baggio's career is filled by cameos of sublime skill, particular games when his imagination and ability enabled his team to transcend all normal expectations. Yet the lasting memory will be of his missed penalty in the shootout at the end of the 1994 World Cup final in Pasadena.

In 2017, Antonio Martelli of La Presse described Baggio as "one of the greatest Italian players of all time maybe the best of the last thirty years", and as "an "authentic champion who could have been even greater without a series of extremely severe knee injuries that undermined his career since its dawning", a view shared by Raffaele Di Fusco, who said "who knows what he could have become without all of those injuries", and also Renzo Ulivieri, who stated that "if he had had fewer injuries, he would have won more." In 2018, Greg Murray of Football Italia described Baggio as "one of the greatest football players of all time" but also lamented that "we never saw him at full fitness and are fortunate we got to enjoy him at all." He summarised Baggio's career with the following: "It is perhaps one of football's great injustices that Il Divin Codino is best known globally for his penalty miss in the Final of the 1994 World Cup against Brazil. For fans of Serie A, Baggio is recognised as the best of his generation, despite a career that was blighted by injury and clashes with his Coaches." He also added:

Retiring in 2004, it has been suggested that Baggio was a victim of the era in which he lived. As player with transcendent creativity, but physically fragile, he struggled to fit into his Coaches’ plans during a time when tactics and hard work were everything. Had he been born in the current era, where players are far more protected, he would perhaps have achieved even more. It's heart-breaking to think what we missed out on, but we’re also grateful to have experienced the Divine Ponytail at all.

Baggio's career was affected by many serious injuries, which led to a gradual loss of pace and mobility as his career progressed, as well as increasing weight-gain in the final years of his career, which eventually forced him to undergo a training regime in order to build muscle mass in his legs and prolong his career during his time at Brescia; his continual physical struggles ultimately led him to retire in 2004, which he later described as a "liberation." Since suffering his first series of career-threatening injuries with Vicenza and Fiorentina in 1985 and 1986, respectively, he was prone to persistent knee problems in particular, which often limited his playing time; (Note: See) injuries led certain pundits, such as Benedetto Ferrara of La Repubblica in 2010, to label Baggio as a "superfine talent" but who was also "inconsistent." In 1995, Maurizio Crosetti, Ferrara's colleague, had previously described Baggio as "fragile." Regarding the injuries that threatened his career as a youngster, and which haggled him until he retired, Baggio wrote in his 2001 autobiography that "all of my professional career, I played it with a leg and a half. Thousands of hours of work to keep alive a leg which, if it were up to her, would diminish each day. I played it without being fully all right, ever, because if I were to play matches only when I felt one-hundred percent I would play three matches a year." Despite the numerous physical impairments he faced throughout his career, Baggio also stood out for his longevity, and was able to maintain a consistently high level of performance even in the final years of his career with Brescia into his late 30s. In 2004, Sacchi praised Baggio for his strength of character, which he believed even surpassed his talent, as it allowed him to overcome his injuries and physical struggles, and ultimately "win [his] personal battles against bad luck." In 2017, Capello noted that Baggio had the extraordinary willpower to carry on playing despite his physical struggles. Baggio attributes his inner strength to Buddhism.

=== Legacy ===
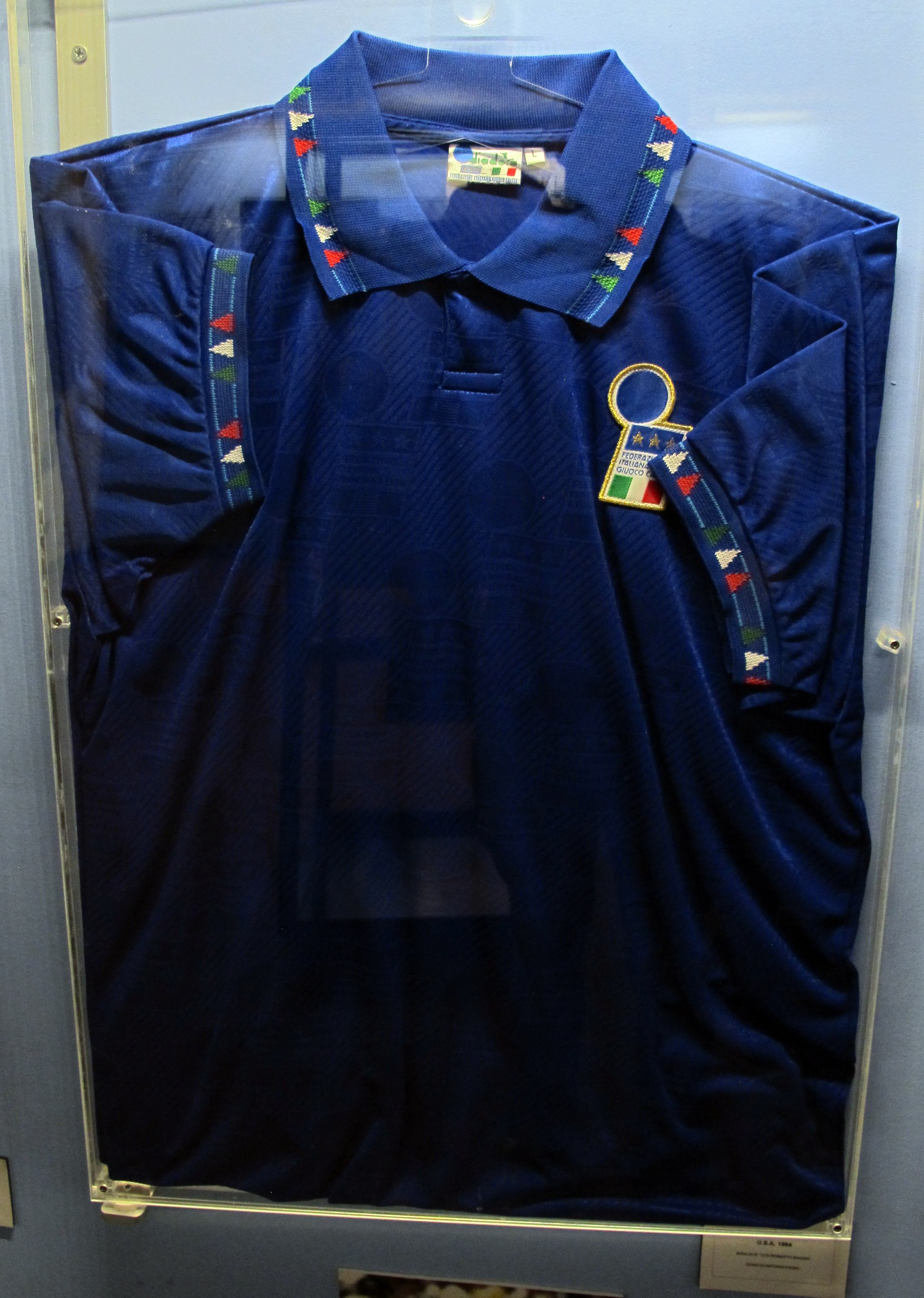
Baggio's Italy jersey is preserved in the Football Museum in Florence.

Widely considered to be one of the greatest footballers of all time, Baggio came fourth in the 1999 FIFA Player of the Century internet poll, and was ranked 16th in World Soccer's list of the 100 greatest footballers of the 20th century, the highest ranked Italian player; in IFFHS's election for the best player of the 20th century in the same year, he was elected the ninth-best Italian player and the 53rd-best European player of the Century. He was voted Italy's player of the century in 2000. In 2002, Baggio was elected to the FIFA World Cup Dream Team, and in 2003, he was the inaugural winner of the Golden Foot award, awarded for ability and personality. In 2004, he was named by Pelé in the FIFA 100 list of the world's greatest living players, and was voted 24th in the online UEFA Golden Jubilee Poll, celebrating the best European footballers of the past 50 years. In 2010, Baggio was named one of the 50 greatest Juventus legends. In 2011, he was the first footballer to be inducted into the Italian Football Hall of Fame. In a 2014 FIFA poll, Baggio was voted the ninth-greatest number 10 of all time, and later that year he was ranked 24th in The Guardian's list of the 100 greatest World Cup players of all time, ahead of the 2014 World Cup in Brazil.

In 2015, journalists of La Gazzetta dello Sport elected the greatest Italian player of all time, with Baggio finishing in second place behind only Gianni Rivera; in a fan poll that was subsequently organised by the newspaper, Baggio was instead voted as the greatest Italian footballer of all time, while Majid Mohamed of UEFA ranked him as the twentieth-best player ever not to have won the UEFA Champions League. That same year, The Daily Telegraph also included Baggio at number 12 in their list of "The top 20 overrated football players of all time." FourFourTwo placed Baggio at number 52 in their 2017 list of the "100 Greatest Footballers Ever" and also named him in 2019 as the sixth best player never to win the UEFA Champions League. In July 2019, the same magazine ranked Baggio at number ten in their list of the "101 greatest football players of the last 25 years" since their first edition in the summer of 1994, while in September 2023, he was ranked 27th in their list of the "100 best football players of all time." In December 2023, Tom Hancock, of the same magazine, placed Baggio at number three, behind only Zidane and Ronaldo, in his list of the greatest footballers of the 1990s. In 2020, Jack Gallagher of 90min.com placed Baggio at number nine in his list of "The 50 Greatest Footballers of All Time", while Sky Sports ranked him as the fifth-best player ever never to have won the Champions League or European Cup.

== Records and selected statistics ==
Baggio played in 16 World Cup matches for Italy; the Republic of Ireland is the only nation against which he played more than once. He is the joint-highest Italian goalscorer of all time in the World Cup, with nine goals, alongside Paolo Rossi and Christian Vieri. Baggio is the only Italian to have scored in three World Cups (two goals in 1990, five in 1994 and two in 1998). Three of his World Cup goals were scored in the group stage and six were scored during knockout matches. Baggio is the joint fourth-highest scorer for Italy with 27 goals in 56 appearances, with a 0.48 goal per match average. With Baggio, Italy was always eliminated from the World Cup in penalty shootouts: in 1990, in the semi-finals against Argentina; in 1994, in the final against Brazil; and in 1998, in the quarter-finals against France.

Despite his decisive penalty miss in the 1994 World Cup final shoot-out, Baggio is statistically one of the greatest penalty kick specialists in Italian football history, as he scored 85% of his career penalties with only 19 misses, scoring 108 out of 127 penalties in official matches, the most in Italian football history. Baggio scored 10 with Vicenza, 25 with Fiorentina, 38 with Juventus, 5 with Milan, 11 with Bologna, 1 with Inter Milan, 11 with Brescia and 7 with Italy (from 7 attempts, the most goals scored from the spot by a member of the national team). 68 of his penalties were scored in Serie A, from 83 attempts, with an 82% conversion rate, one of the best records in Serie A history. In Serie A, Baggio scored 17 penalties for Fiorentina (from 19 attempts), 25 for Juventus (from 28 attempts), 3 for Milan (from 5 attempts), 11 for Bologna (from 11 attempts), 1 for Inter Milan (from 2 attempts), and 11 for Brescia (from 18 attempts). Baggio has scored penalties for six different Serie A clubs. Four of his fifteen misses in Serie A were then scored on rebounds. Behind Totti, Baggio has scored the most penalties in Serie A history. Of his other penalties, 8 were scored in Serie C (from 8 attempts), 8 in European competitions (from 9 attempts), and 17 in the Coppa Italia (from 20 attempts). In shoot-outs, Baggio converted three of four career penalties: one in the UEFA Cup with Fiorentina, and the other two with Italy at the World Cup; in World Cup shootouts, Baggio scored twice (1990 and 1998), with his only miss in 1994.

Although he never won the Serie A top goalscorer title, Baggio is currently the seventh all-time highest scorer in Serie A, with 205 goals in 452 appearances. Of these goals, 96 were decisive (either equalisers or match winners). Alongside Totti, Baggio has also scored the fourth-highest number of free-kicks in Serie A with 21 goals; ahead of him are only Alessando Del Piero, Andrea Pirlo, and Siniša Mihajlović. Of his open play goals in Serie A, 84 were with his right foot, 26 with his left, and 6 were headers. He also assisted 123 goals in Serie A, making him the second–highest assist provider of all time in Serie A, behind only Totti. He is the fourth-highest scoring Italian in all competitions, behind Del Piero, Giueseppe Meazza and Silvio Piola, with 318 professional career goals in 699 appearances. (Note: 321 goals in 703 appearances if his three goals and four caps for the Italy U-16 team are also included.) Alongside Totti and Alberto Gilardino, he has scored against the most different clubs (38) in Serie A. With eight hat-tricks in Serie A, he has also scored the joint-tenth most hat-tricks in the history of the Italian league, alongside Amedeo Amadei, Giampiero Boniperti, Hernán Crespo, and Marco van Basten. Throughout his career, including friendlies, Baggio scored 425 goals.

== After retirement ==
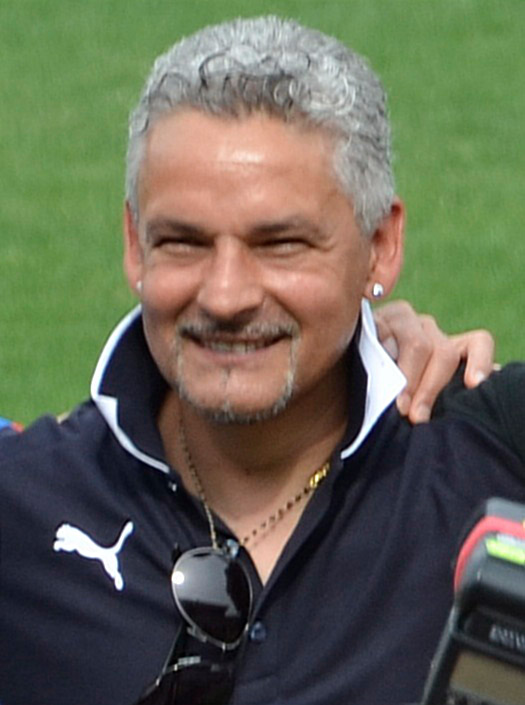
Baggio in 2013

Following Italy’s failure to move on from the 2010 World Cup group stage, in August 2010 Baggio was appointed president of the technical sector of the Italian Football Federation, replacing his former Italy national team manager Azeglio Vicini. In December 2011, he presented a 900-page report titled "Renewing the future", which proposed an overhaul of the federation’s talent development paths. On 23 January 2013, Baggio stepped down from the position, stating the federation had ignored his ideas about improving the system and focusing on youth talent, which prompted him to resign. In 2026, following Italy’s third consecutive failure to reach the World Cup from the play-off round, Baggio’s report and his attempts to reform the Italian football system were recirculated in the media.

In July 2011, Baggio obtained his UEFA A License, which made him eligible to coach Lega Pro teams, or work as vice-coach in Serie A and Serie B. On 5 July 2012, Baggio obtained his Category 1 UEFA Pro Coaching Licence at Coverciano, which officially allows him to coach a professional Serie A club.

== Outside of professional football ==
=== Personal life ===
After his career threatening injury in 1985, Baggio, formerly a Roman Catholic, converted to Buddhism, practicing Nichiren Buddhism, and is a member of the Soka Gakkai International Buddhist organisation. The captain's armband that he wore throughout his career bore the colours of this religious school (blue, yellow, and red) and the Japanese motto "We win. We must win" in ideograms of the language. Despite his conversion, he married his long-time girlfriend Andreina Fabbi in 1989 in a traditional Roman Catholic ceremony. They have a daughter, Valentina (1990), and two sons, Mattia (1994) and Leonardo (2005).

Between 1991 and 2012, Baggio was the owner of a sporting goods store in Thiene, Vicenza, called Baggio Sport, which he was eventually forced to close due to losses from the Great Recession.

In 2001, Baggio wrote an autobiography entitled Una porta nel cielo (literally "A Door in the Sky", also known as "A Goal in the Sky"), including details about his career, childhood, religion, personal life and rifts with managers. It won the award for best football book at the 2002 Serie A Awards.

Baggio has close ties with Argentina; he speaks Spanish and owns a ranch property in Rivera, where he enjoys hunting wild game. In March 2008, he gave a lengthy interview with La Gazzetta Dello Sport, in which he revealed that he came to support Argentine club Boca Juniors due to their passionate fanbase.

In June 2024, Baggio sustained minor injuries during a robbery at his villa near Vicenza.

=== Philanthropy ===
On 16 October 2002, Baggio was named a Goodwill Ambassador of the Food and Agriculture Organization of the United Nations, Through the organisation, Baggio helped to fund hospitals, raise money for the victims of the Haiti earthquake, contribute to tackling bird flu, and was involved in the Burmese pro-democracy movement, which supported the opposition leader Aung San Suu Kyi and her release from prison. Baggio was awarded the 2010 Man of Peace title in Hiroshima, presented by the World Summit of Nobel Peace Laureates in recognition of his charitable work and contribution to social justice and peace.

On 8 October 2008, Baggio appeared in a charity match between Milan and Fiorentina, which had been organised in honour of his former Fiorentina teammate Stefano Borgonovo to raise money for his foundation, his treatment and for ALS research. In 2014, Baggio was one of the many celebrities to take part in the "ALS Ice Bucket Challenge" to raise awareness about the disease and funds for ALS research.

On 1 September 2014, Baggio took part in the "Match for Peace", which was played at the Stadio Olimpico in Rome, with the proceeds being donated to charity. Baggio set up Juan Iturbe's goal and scored from a Diego Maradona assist. On 25 October 2014, Baggio participated in the opening of the SGI Ikeda Cultural Center in Corsico, on the outskirts of Milan. It is the largest Buddhist center in Europe.

=== Media and popular culture ===
In 1994, Italian satirist Corrado Guzzanti parodied Baggio's advertisement for Italian Petrol Company IP prior to the 1994 World Cup. Italian poet Giovanni Raboni composed the sonnet "Lode a Baggio" in a tribute to him. He has been referenced in several songs, such as "Baggio, Baggio" by Lucio Dalla, "Marmellata n. 25" by Cesare Cremonini and "Baggio" by Miles Kane.

Baggio has featured in two Italian commercials which reference his penalty miss in the 1994 World Cup final. The first was made for Wind in 2000, and shows Baggio scoring the final penalty to win the tournament. The second, made for Johnnie Walker in 2001, showed how he managed to conquer his grief from the miss by believing in himself and scoring the equalising penalty against Chile in the 1998 World Cup. He has featured in several Diadora commercials, as he endorsed their products. In July 2017, Diadora teamed up with Baggio once again to launch the new Signature Match Winner RB Capsule Collection.

Baggio is popular in Japan, and has held close ties with the country since his conversion to Buddhism. He has endorsed several Japanese football video games, such as Human Entertainment's Super Formation Soccer 95: della Serie A, and Sega's Virtua Pro Football and Let's Make a Soccer Team!. An animated version of himself appeared in the Japanese football cartoon Captain Tsubasa, best known in Italy as Che Campioni: Holly & Benji.

In the Channel 4 sitcom Father Ted, Baggio (and Alessandro Costacurta) is mentioned during the 1995 episode "Grant Unto Him Eternal Rest" by Father Dougal McGuire (portrayed by Ardal O'Hanlon), who, when prompted to say the last rites in Latin, ends up saying the footballers' names. (This stems from Graham Linehan and O'Hanlon being fans of Football Italia). In the music video for the 2010 World Cup song "Waka Waka (This Time for Africa)" by Shakira, footage of Baggio's goal against Spain and his penalty miss from the 1994 World Cup are shown.

Throughout his career, Baggio has been nicknamed the Divin' Codino ("Divine Ponytail" in Italian, a reference to the iconic hairstyle he wore for a large part of his career as well as his playing ability and Buddhist beliefs) and Robi, or Roby, by his fans. An alter-ego of his is referenced in the Italian children's comics of "Mickey Mouse" and "Duck Tales" (Topolino) in the volume Topolino e il Giallo alla World Cup in which he is known as Roberto Paggio. In 2011, Italian sports newspaper La Gazzetta dello Sport issued a collection of DVDs entitled Io Che Sarò Roberto Baggio recounting his career. Baggio's impact on football has been celebrated with the release of an online game called Baggio's Magical Kicks, in which players try to replicate his accuracy on free-kicks and penalties. In 2015, the arcade game company Konami announced Baggio would feature in their football video game Pro Evolution Soccer 2016 as one of the new myClub Legends. On 3 August 2018, EA Sports announced on their official Twitter account that Baggio would feature in EA Sports' football video game FIFA 19 as one of the new Ultimate Team Icons.

In 2019, Netflix announced the development of a documentary on Roberto Baggio in partnership with Mediaset. In March 2021, Netflix released the trailer of a docudrama film on Baggio's career, entitled Baggio: The Divine Ponytail, which was released on 26 May 2021; Andrea Arcangeli portrayed Baggio.

== Career statistics ==
=== Club ===
Appearances and goals by club, season and competition:
Club	Season	League			Coppa Italia		Europe		Other		Total	
Club	Season	Division	Apps	Goals	Apps	Goals	Apps	Goals	Apps	Goals	Apps	Goals
Vicenza	1982–83	Serie C1	1	0	0	0	–		–		1	0
Vicenza	1983–84	Serie C1	6	1	4	0	–		2 (Note: Two appearances in the 1983–84 Coppa Italia Serie C)	1	12	2
Vicenza	1984–85	Serie C1	29	12	5	2	–		–		34	14
Vicenza	Total		36	13	9	2	–		2	1	47	16
Fiorentina	1985–86	Serie A	0	0	5	0	–		–		5	0
Fiorentina	1986–87	Serie A	5	1	4	2	1 (Note: Appearances in the UEFA Cup)	0	–		10	3
Fiorentina	1987–88	Serie A	27	6	7	3	–		–		34	9
Fiorentina	1988–89	Serie A	30	15	10	9	–		1 (Note: Appearance in the 1988–89 Serie A seventh-place tiebreaker match against Roma to qualify for the 1989–90 UEFA Cup)	0	41	24
Fiorentina	1989–90	Serie A	32	17	2	1	12	1	–		46	19
Fiorentina	Total		94	39	28	15	13	1	1	0	136	55
Juventus	1990–91	Serie A	33	14	5	3	8 (Note: Appearances in the UEFA Cup Winners' Cup)	9	1 (Note: Appearance in Supercoppa Italiana)	1	47	27
Juventus	1991–92	Serie A	32	18	8	4	–		–		40	22
Juventus	1992–93	Serie A	27	21	7	3	9	6	–		43	30
Juventus	1993–94	Serie A	32	17	2	2	7	3	–		41	22
Juventus	1994–95	Serie A	17	8	4	2	8	4	–		29	14
Juventus	Total		141	78	26	14	32	22	1	1	200	115
AC Milan	1995–96	Serie A	28	7	1	0	5	3	–		34	10
AC Milan	1996–97	Serie A	23	5	5	3	5 (Note: Appearances in the UEFA Champions League)	1	0	0	33	9
AC Milan	Total		51	12	6	3	10	4	0	0	67	19
Bologna	1997–98	Serie A	30	22	3	1	–		–		33	23
Inter Milan	1998–99	Serie A	23	5	4	0	6 (Note: Appearances in the UEFA Champions League; includes two appearances, one goal in the second qualifying round)	4	2 (Note: Two appearances in the two-legged 1998–99 Coppa Italia third-place tiebreaker round against Bologna to qualify for the 1999–2000 UEFA Cup)	1	35	10
Inter Milan	1999–00	Serie A	18	4	5	1	–		1 (Note: Appearance in the 1999–2000 Serie A fourth-place tiebreaker match against Parma to qualify for the 2000–01 UEFA Champions League)	2	24	7
Inter Milan	Total		41	9	9	1	6	4	3	3	59	17
Brescia	2000–01	Serie A	25	10	3	0	–		–		28	10
Brescia	2001–02	Serie A	12	11	1	0	2 (Note: Appearances in the UEFA Intertoto Cup)	1	–		15	12
Brescia	2002–03	Serie A	32	12	0	0	–		–		32	12
Brescia	2003–04	Serie A	26	12	0	0	0	0	–		26	12
Brescia	Total		95	45	4	0	2	1	–		101	46
Career total			488	218	85	36	63	32	7	5	643	291

=== International ===
Appearances and goals by national team and year
National team	Year	Apps	Goals
Italy	1988	1	0
Italy	1989	6	3
Italy	1990	9	4
Italy	1991	2	1
Italy	1992	7	6
Italy	1993	7	5
Italy	1994	12	5
Italy	1995	1	0
Italy	1996	0	0
Italy	1997	2	1
Italy	1998	6	2
Italy	1999	2	0
Italy	2000	0	0
Italy	2001	0	0
Italy	2002	0	0
Italy	2003	0	0
Italy	2004	1	0
Total		56	27

Scores and results list Italy's goal tally first, score column indicates score after each Baggio goal.

List of international goals scored by Roberto Baggio
No.	Date	Venue	Opponent	Score	Result	Competition
1	22 April 1989	Stadio Marc'Antonio Bentegodi, Verona, Italy	Uruguay	1–0	1–1	Friendly
2	20 September 1989	Stadio Dino Manuzzi, Cesena, Italy	Bulgaria	1–0	4–0	Friendly
3	20 September 1989	Stadio Dino Manuzzi, Cesena, Italy	Bulgaria	2–0	4–0	Friendly
4	19 June 1990	Stadio Olimpico, Rome, Italy	Czechoslovakia	2–0	2–0	1990 FIFA World Cup
5	7 July 1990	Stadio San Nicola, Bari, Italy	England	1–0	2–1	1990 FIFA World Cup
6	26 September 1990	Stadio La Favorita, Palermo, Italy	Netherlands	1–0	1–0	Friendly
7	17 October 1990	Népstadion, Budapest, Hungary	Hungary	1–1	1–1	UEFA Euro 1992 qualifying
8	21 December 1991	Stadio Pino Zaccheria, Foggia, Italy	Cyprus	2–0	2–0	UEFA Euro 1992 qualifying
9	19 February 1992	Stadio Dino Manuzzi, Cesena, Italy	San Marino	1–0	4–0	Friendly
10	19 February 1992	Stadio Dino Manuzzi, Cesena, Italy	San Marino	2–0	4–0	Friendly
11	25 March 1992	Stadio delle Alpi, Turin, Italy	Germany	1–0	1–0	Friendly
12	6 June 1992	Soldier Field, Chicago, United States	United States	1–0	1–1	1992 U.S. Cup
13	9 September 1992	Philips Stadion, Eindhoven, Netherlands	Netherlands	2–2	3–2	Friendly
14	14 October 1992	Stadio Sant'Elia, Cagliari, Italy	Switzerland	1–2	2–2	1994 FIFA World Cup qualification
15	20 January 1993	Stadio Artemio Franchi, Florence, Italy	Mexico	1–0	2–0	Friendly
16	24 February 1993	Estádio das Antas, Porto, Portugal	Portugal	1–0	3–1	1994 FIFA World Cup qualification
17	14 April 1993	Stadio Nereo Rocco, Trieste, Italy	Estonia	1–0	3–1	1994 FIFA World Cup qualification
18	22 September 1993	Kadriorg Stadium, Tallinn, Estonia	Estonia	1–0	3–0	1994 FIFA World Cup qualification
19	22 September 1993	Kadriorg Stadium, Tallinn, Estonia	Estonia	3–0	3–0	1994 FIFA World Cup qualification
20	5 July 1994	Foxboro Stadium, Foxborough, United States	Nigeria	1–1	2–1	1994 FIFA World Cup
21	5 July 1994	Foxboro Stadium, Foxborough, United States	Nigeria	2–1	2–1	1994 FIFA World Cup
22	9 July 1994	Foxboro Stadium, Foxborough, United States	Spain	2–1	2–1	1994 FIFA World Cup
23	13 July 1994	Giants Stadium, East Rutherford, United States	Bulgaria	1–0	2–1	1994 FIFA World Cup
24	13 July 1994	Giants Stadium, East Rutherford, United States	Bulgaria	2–0	2–1	1994 FIFA World Cup
25	30 April 1997	Stadio San Paolo, Naples, Italy	Poland	3–0	3–0	1998 FIFA World Cup qualification
26	11 June 1998	Stade du Parc Lescure, Bordeaux, France	Chile	2–2	2–2	1998 FIFA World Cup
27	23 June 1998	Stade de France, Saint-Denis, France	Austria	2–0	2–1	1998 FIFA World Cup

== Honours ==
Juventus

- Serie A: 1994–95
- Coppa Italia: 1994–95
- UEFA Cup: 1992–93

AC Milan

- Serie A: 1995–96

Italy

- FIFA World Cup Runner-Up: 1994; Third Place 1990

Individual

- Guerin d'Oro (Serie C Best Player): 1985
- Bravo Award: 1990
- UEFA Cup Winners' Cup Top Scorer: 1990–91 (9 Goals)
- World Soccer's World Player of the Year: 1993
- Ballon d'Or: 1993
  - 2nd Place: 1994
  - 8th Place: 1990
- FIFA World Player of the Year: 1993
  - 3rd Place: 1994
  - 5th Place: 1995
- Onze d'Or: 1993
  - Onze de Bronze: 1994
  - Onze d'Argent: 1995
- Onze de Onze: 1993, 1994, 1995
- FIFA World Cup Silver Ball: 1994
- FIFA World Cup All-Star Team: 1994
- Don Balón Award: 1994
- Super Onze d'Or (4th Place): 1995
- Serie A Top Assist-Provider: 1995–96 (12 Assists)
- Planète Foot's Best 50 Players of All Time: 1996
- Il Venerdì's Best 100 Players of All Time: 1997 (32nd Place)
- World Soccer's Greatest Players of the 20th Century: 1999 (16th Place)
- Guerin Sportivo's Greatest Players of the 20th Century: 1999 (27th Place)
- IFFHS Italian Player of the 20th Century: 1999 (9th Place)
- IFFHS European Player of the 20th Century: 1999 (53rd Place)
- France Football's Football Player of the Century: 1999 (18th Place)
- Placar's Best 100 Players of All Time: 1999 (91st Place)
- FIFA XI: 2000, 2002
- Guerin d'Oro: 2001
- Premio Nazionale Carriera Esemplare "Gaetano Scirea": 2001
- Gran Galà del Calcio 'Best Football Book' Award: 2001
- FIFA World Cup Dream Team: 2002
- Gran Galà del Calcio 'Serie A Most Loved Player' Award: 2002
- Golden Foot: 2003
- FIFA 100: 2004
- UEFA Golden Jubilee Poll: 2004 (24th Place)
- Giuseppe Prisco Award: 2004
- San Siro Gentleman Nazionale Award: 2004
- Placar's Best 100 World Cup Players: 2005 (24th Place)
- Association of Football Statisticians's Best 100 Players of All Time: 2007 (79th Place)
- AC Milan Hall of Fame
- Man of Peace: 2010
- Italian Football Hall of Fame: 2011
- Juventus FC 50 Club Legends: 2011
- Gentleman di Platino: 2015
- Walk of Fame of Italian Sport: 2015
- IFFHS' 48 Football Men's Legend Players
- Juventus FC Hall of Fame: 2025

Orders

- 5th Class / Knight: Cavaliere Ordine al Merito della Repubblica Italiana: 1991

== Bibliography ==
- Baggio, Roberto (2001). Una porta nel cielo [A goal in the sky] (in Italian). Arezzo: Limina Edizioni. pp. 49–59. ISBN 88-88551-92-1.
- Nappi, Raffaele (2018). Roberto Baggio. Divin codino [Roberto Baggio. Divine ponytail] (in Italian). Rome: Giulio Perrone Editore. ISBN 978-88-6004-465-5.
