= 1984–85 Serie C1 =

Italian football league season

The 1984–85 Serie C1 was the seventh edition of Serie C1, the third highest league in the Italian football league system.

== Overview ==
=== Serie C1/A ===
It was contested by 18 teams, and Brescia won the championship. It was decided that Brescia, Lanerossi Vicenza was promoted to Serie B, and Jesina, Asti T.S.C., Pistoiese, Treviso was demoted in Serie C2.

=== Serie C1/B ===
It was contested by 18 teams, and Catanzaro won the championship. It was decided that Catanzaro, Palermo was promoted to Serie B, and Reggina, Francavilla, Akragas, Nocerina was demoted in Serie C2.

== League standings ==
=== Serie C1/A ===
Pos	Team	Pts	Promotion or relegation
1	Brescia (P)	48	Promoted to 1985–86 Serie B
2	Lanerossi Vicenza (P)	45	Promoted to 1985–86 Serie B
3	Piacenza	45	
4	Rimini	40	
5	Reggiana	36	
6	Ancona	35	
7	Livorno	35	
8	Modena	33	
9	Legnano	32	
10	Pavia	32	
11	Rondinella Marzocco	32	
12	Sanremese	32	
13	Carrarese	31	
14	Spal	30	
15	Jesina	30	
16	Asti T.S.C.	27	
17	Pistoiese	27	
18	Treviso	22	

Source: rsssf.com
(P) Promoted

Tiebreaker: Vicenza-Piacenza 3-1

=== Serie C1/B ===
Pos	Team	Pts	Promotion or relegation
1	Catanzaro (P)	45	Promoted to 1985–86 Serie B
2	Palermo (P)	45	Promoted to 1985–86 Serie B
3	Messina	42	
4	Salernitana	38	
5	Monopoli	37	
6	Casertana	37	
7	Cosenza	37	
8	Campania	32	
9	Casarano	32	
10	Ternana	32	
11	Benevento	32	
12	Barletta	32	
13	Foggia	32	
14	Cavese	31	
15	Reggina	31	
16	Francavilla	30	
17	Akragas	24	
18	Nocerina	23	

Source: rsssf.com
(P) Promoted
