= 2003–04 Brescia Calcio season =

Brescia Calcio
2003–04 season
- Chairman: Luigi Corioni
- Manager: Gianni De Biasi
- Stadium: Stadio Mario Rigamonti
- Serie A: 11th
- Coppa Italia: Second Round
- UEFA Intertoto Cup: Third Round
- Top goalscorer: Roberto Baggio (12); Andrea Caracciolo (12)

During the 2003–04 Italian football season, Brescia Calcio competed in the Serie A.

== Kit ==
Brescia's kit was manufactured by Italian sports retailer Kappa and sponsored by Banca Lombarda.

== Squad ==
Note: Flags indicate national team as defined under FIFA eligibility rules; some limited exceptions apply. Players may hold more than one non-FIFA nationality.

No.	Pos.	Nation	Player
22	GK	ITA	Federico Agliardi
1	GK	ITA	Luca Castellazzi
22	DF	ITA	Tiziano Ramon
3	DF	ITA	Dario Dainelli
16	DF	PAR	Victor Hugo Mareco
5	DF	CRC	Gilberto Martinez
4	DF	ITA	Fabio Petruzzi
30	DF	ITA	Marco Pisano
20	DF	ITA	Paolo Castellini
2	DF	LTU	Marius Stankevičius
32	MF	ITA	Luigi Di Biagio
6	MF	ITA	Stefano Mauri

No.	Pos.	Nation	Player
26	MF	ITA	Jonathan Bachini
14	MF	URU	Alejandro Correa
17	MF	ITA	Roberto Guana
8	MF	BRA	Matuzalem
19	MF	AUT	Markus Schopp
7	MF	ITA	Matteo Brighi
21	MF	ITA	Giuseppe Colucci
25	MF	NGA	Cyril Gona
11	MF	ITA	Simone Del Nero
13	MF	MAR	Abderrazzak Jadid
35	FW	ITA	Andrea Alberti
10	FW	ITA	Roberto Baggio
29	FW	ITA	Andrea Caracciolo
9	FW	ITA	Filippo Maniero

=== Transfers ===
In
R.	Name	from	Type
DF	Paolo Castellini	Torino	loan
MF	Luigi Di Biagio	Inter	free
MF	Matteo Brighi	Parma	loan
MF	Stefano Mauri	Modena	loan
FW	Andrea Caracciolo	Perugia	loan ended
FW	Filippo Maniero	Palermo	loan

Out
R.	Name	to	Type
MF	Stephen Appiah	Juventus	loan ended
FW	Luca Toni	Palermo	
MF	Josep Guardiola	Al Ahli	
DF	Anthony Seric	Parma	loan
MF	Antonio Filippini	Palermo	
FW	Igli Tare	Bologna FC	
GK	Diego Sebastián Saja	Rayo Vallecano	
FW	Raúl Alberto González	Martina Franca	
FW	Mario Salgado	Red Bull Salzburg	loan

== Competitions ==
=== Serie A ===
==== League table ====
Pos	Team	Pld	W	D	L	GF	GA	GD	Pts
9	Chievo	34	11	11	12	36	37	−1	44
10	Lecce	34	11	8	15	43	56	−13	41
11	Brescia	34	9	13	12	52	57	−5	40
12	Bologna	34	10	9	15	45	53	−8	39
13	Reggina	34	6	16	12	29	45	−16	34 (Note: Reggina finished ahead of Siena on head-to-head points: Reggina 2–1 Siena, Siena 0–0 Reggina.)

Source: Almanacco Illustrato del Calcio – La Storia 1898-2004, Panini Edizioni, Modena, September 2005
Rules for classification: 1) points; 2) tiebreaker for relevant positions 3) head-to-head points and goal difference; 4) head-to-head goals scored; 5) goal difference; 6) number of goals scored.

==== Results by round ====
Round	1	2	3	4	5	6	7	8	9	10	11	12	13	14	15	16	17	18	19	20	21	22	23	24	25	26	27	28	29	30	31	32	33	34
Ground	H	A	H	A	A	H	A	H	H	A	H	A	H	A	H	A	H	A	H	A	H	H	A	H	A	A	H	A	H	A	H	A	H	A
Result	D	L	D	L	W	D	L	L	D	D	L	D	W	D	W	W	L	L	W	D	D	L	W	L	D	L	W	L	D	D	D	W	W	L
Position	6	10	13	15	11	11	12	13	13	13	13	14	12	13	11	10	11	12	10	11	11	11	10	10	10	10	11	11	11	11	11	11	10	11

Source: Competitive matches
A = Away; H = Home; W = Win; D = Draw; L = Loss; = Leader, UEFA Champions League Groups stage; = UEFA Champions League Groups stage; = UEFA Champions League Qualifying round; = 2004–05 UEFA Cup; = 2004–05 Serie B

==== Matches ====
31 August 2003 1	Brescia	1–1	Chievo Verona	Brescia
	Filippini A. 58' (pen.)	Report	12' Lanna	Stadium: Stadio Mario Rigamonti; Referee: Marco Gabriele

14 September 2003 2	Roma	5–0	Brescia	Roma
	Montella 11'; Chivu 16'; Totti 23', 58'; Carew 44' (pen.)	Report		Stadium: Stadio Olimpico; Referee: Pieri

21 September 2003 3	Brescia	4–4	Reggina	Brescia
	Di Biagio 10'; Caracciolo 52'; Filippini A. 53'; Petruzzi 87'	Report	24' (pen.), 73' Nakamura; 39' Bonazzoli; 62' Sottil	Stadium: Stadio Mario Rigamonti; Referee: Bertini

28 September 2003 4	Sampdoria	2–1	Brescia	Genova
	Bazzani 88'; Flachi 90' (pen.)	Report	69' Mauri	Stadium: Stadio Luigi Ferraris; Referee: Saccani

5 October 2003 5	Lecce	1–4	Brescia	Lecce
	Cassetti 33'	Report	7', 69', 84' Caracciolo; 86' Baggio	Stadium: Stadio Via del Mare; Referee: Pellegrino

18 October 2003 6	Brescia	2–2	Inter	Brescia
	Baggio 22'; Caracciolo 49'	Report	62' Cruz; 87' (pen.) Vieri	Stadium: Stadio Mario Rigamonti; Referee: Pieri

26 October 2003 7	Juventus	2–0	Brescia	Juventus
	Nedved 6'; Trezeguet 45'	Report		Stadium: Stadio delle Alpi; Referee: Paparesta

2 November 2003 8	Brescia	2–3	Parma	Brescia
	Matuzalem 4'; Di Biagio 38'	Report	12' Morfeo; 43' Marchionni; 71' Gilardino	Stadium: Stadio Mario Rigamonti; Referee: Bertini

8 November 2003 9	Brescia	0–0	Bologna	Brescia
		Report		Stadium: Stadio Mario Rigamonti; Referee: De Santis

23 November 2003 10	Ancona	1–1	Brescia	Ancona
	Berretta 60'	Report	5' Baggio	Stadium: Stadio del Conero; Referee: Saccani

30 November 2003 11	Brescia	1–2	Udinese	Brescia
	Caracciolo 65'	Report	47' Jørgensen; 56' Fava	Stadium: Stadio Mario Rigamonti; Referee: Cruciani

7 December 2003 12	Modena	1–1	Brescia	Modena
	Taldo 83'	Report	86' Bachini	Stadium: Stadio Alberto Braglia; Referee: Paparesta

14 December 2003 13	Brescia	2–0	Empoli	Brescia
	Mauri 15'; Di Biagio 20'	Report		Stadium: Stadio Mario Rigamonti; Referee: Palanca

21 December 2003 14	Perugia	2–2	Brescia	Perugia
	Margiotta 5'; Dainelli 72' (o.g.)	Report	10' Di Biagio; 77' Filippini A.	Stadium: Stadio Renato Curi; Referee: Rizzoli

6 January 2004 15	Brescia	4–2	Siena	Brescia
	Mauri 16', 87'; Baggio 21', 52'	Report	45' Argilli; 47' Flo	Stadium: Stadio Mario Rigamonti; Referee: Palanca

11 January 2004 16	Lazio	0–1	Brescia	Roma
		Report	5' Di Biagio	Stadium: Stadio Olimpico; Referee: Rizzoli

18 January 2004 17	Brescia	0–1	Milan	Brescia
		Report	81' Giuseppe Pancaro	Stadium: Stadio Mario Rigamonti; Referee: Bertini

25 January 2004 18	Chievo	3–1	Brescia	Verona
	Barzagli 52'; Santana 73'; Sculli 84'	Report	10' Caracciolo	Stadium: Stadio Marcantonio Bentegodi; Referee: Farina

31 January 2004 19	Brescia	1–0	Roma	Brescia
	Bachini 43' (pen.)	Report		Stadium: Stadio Mario Rigamonti; Referee: Bolognino

8 February 2004 20	Reggina	0–0	Brescia	Reggio Calabria
		Report		Stadium: Stadio Oreste Granillo; Referee: Pieri

15 February 2004 21	Brescia	1–1	Sampdoria	Brescia
	Caracciolo 5'	Report	56' Doni	Stadium: Stadio Mario Rigamonti; Referee: Gabriele

22 February 2004 22	Brescia	1–2	Lecce	Brescia
	Baggio 92'	Report	12' Chevanton; 88' Cassetti	Stadium: Stadio Mario Rigamonti; Referee: Dattilo

29 February 2004 23	Inter	1–3	Brescia	Milan
	Stankovic 48'	Report	67', 81' Caracciolo; 73' Del Nero	Stadium: Stadio Giuseppe Meazza; Referee: Ayroldi

6 March 2004 24	Brescia	2–3	Juventus	Brescia
	Mauri 3'; Caracciolo 39'	Report	53' (pen.) Miccoli; 55' Di Vaio; 75' Nedved	Stadium: Stadio Mario Rigamonti; Referee: Bertini

14 March 2004 25	Parma	2–2	Brescia	Parma
	Carbone 5'; Marchionni 60'	Report	32' Di Biagio; 74' Baggio	Stadium: Stadio Ennio Tardini; Referee: Dondarini

21 March 2004 26	Bologna	3–0	Brescia	Bologna
	Tare 40'; Nervo 70'; Signori 80'	Report		Stadium: Stadio Renato Dall'Ara; Referee: Saccani

28 March 2004 27	Brescia	5–2	Ancona	Brescia
	Baggio 22', 83'; Mauri 29'; Colucci 45'; Caracciolo 74'	Report	31' Rapaic; 37' (pen.) Maini	Stadium: Stadio Mario Rigamonti; Referee: Rosetti

4 April 2004 28	Udinese	4–3	Brescia	Udine
	Iaquinta 5', 30'; Fava 15', 82'	Report	45' Baggio; 47' Di Biagio; 61' Maniero	Stadium: Stadio Friuli; Referee: Bolognino

10 April 2004 29	Brescia	0–0	Modena	Brescia
		Report		Stadium: Stadio Mario Rigamonti; Referee: Racalbuto

18 April 2004 30	Empoli	1–1	Brescia	Empoli
	Gasparetto 68'	Report	17' (o.g.) Ficini	Stadium: Stadio Carlo Castellani; Referee: Rodomonti

25 April 2004 31	Brescia	1–1	Perugia	Brescia
	Baggio 45'	Report	37' Ravanelli	Stadium: Stadio Mario Rigamonti; Referee: Rodomonti

2 May 2004 32	Siena	0–1	Brescia	Siena
		Report	60' Brighi	Stadium: Stadio Artemio Franchi (Siena); Referee: Farina

9 May 2004 33	Brescia	2–1	S.S. Lazio	Brescia
	Mauri 81'; Baggio 89'	Report	93' César	Stadium: Stadio Mario Rigamonti; Referee: Salvatore Racalbuto

16 May 2004 34	A.C. Milan	4–2	Brescia	Milan
	Tomasson 36', 59'; Ševčenko 38'; Rui Costa 66'	Report	53', 69' Matuzalem	Stadium: San Siro; Referee: Antonio Giannoccaro

== Statistics ==
=== Players statistics ===
No.	Pos	Nat	Player	Total		2003-04 Serie A	
No.	Pos	Nat	Player	Apps	Goals	Apps	Goals
22	GK	(Italy) ITA	Federico Agliardi	17	-20	16+1	-20
5	DF	(Costa Rica) CRC	Gilberto Martinez	30	0	28+2	0
3	DF	(Italy) ITA	Dario Dainelli	31	0	31	0
4	DF	(Italy) ITA	Fabio Petruzzi	20	1	18+2	1
20	DF	(Italy) ITA	Paolo Castellini	16	0	16	0
6	MF	(Italy) ITA	Stefano Mauri	30	7	29+1	7
32	MF	(Italy) ITA	Luigi Di Biagio	31	7	31	7
7	MF	(Italy) ITA	Matteo Brighi	29	1	25+4	1
8	MF	(Brazil) BRA	Matuzalem	30	3	30	3
10	FW	(Italy) ITA	Roberto Baggio	26	12	25+1	12
29	FW	(Italy) ITA	Andrea Caracciolo	31	12	29+2	12
1	GK	(Italy) ITA	Luca Castellazzi	14	-29	14	-29
26	MF	(Italy) ITA	Jonathan Bachini	25	2	16+9	2
18	MF	(Italy) ITA	Antonio Filippini	16	3	15+1	3
30	DF	(Italy) ITA	Marco Pisano	9	0	9	0
21	MF	(Italy) ITA	Giuseppe Colucci	17	0	8+9	0
16	DF	(Paraguay) PAR	Victor Hugo Mareco	10	0	8+2	0
19	MF	(Austria) AUT	Markus Schopp	20	0	6+14	0
9	FW	(Italy) ITA	Filippo Maniero	18	1	6+12	1
11	MF	(Italy) ITA	Simone Del Nero	21	1	5+16	1
2	DF	(Lithuania) LTU	Marius Stankevičius	15	0	4+11	0
12	GK	(Argentina) ARG	Sebastián Saja	4	-8	4	-8
17	MF	(Italy) ITA	Roberto Guana	5	0	1+4	0
14	MF	(Uruguay) URU	Alejandro Correa	5	0	0+5	0
34	FW	(Argentina) ARG	Raul Gonzalez	2	0	0+2	0
22	DF	(Italy) ITA	Tiziano Ramon				
25	MF	(Nigeria) NGA	Cyril Gona				
13	MF	(Morocco) MAR	Abderrazzak Jadid				
35	FW	(Italy) ITA	Andrea Alberti				

- Source: http://calcio-seriea.net/presenze/2003/1236/
