= Cerilli =

Cerilli is an Italian surname. Notable people with the surname include:

- Franco Cerilli (born 1953), Italian footballer
- Marianne Cerilli (born 1961), Canadian politician
