= Stefano Argilli =

Italian former footballer

Personal information
- Full name: Stefano Argilli
- Date of birth: 5 January 1973 (age 53)
- Place of birth: Rimini, Italy
- Height: 1.78 m (5 ft 10 in)
- Positions: Midfielder; central defender

Youth career
- Rimini

Senior career*
| Years | Team | Apps | (Gls) |
| 1991–1996 | Rimini | 94 | (2) |
| 1996–2005 | Siena | 211 | (12) |
| 2005–2006 | Modena | 19 | (1) |
| 2006 | Livorno | 11 | (0) |
| 2007 | Frosinone | 13 | (0) |
| 2007–2009 | Cremonese | 36 | (0) |

Managerial career
- 2021: Siena
- * Club domestic league appearances and goals

Stefano Argilli (born 5 January 1973) is an Italian former footballer who played as a midfielder and as a central defender.

== Football career ==
Argilli started his career at hometown club Rimini. In 1996, he left for Siena, where he played for the team from Serie C1 to Serie A. In summer 2005, he left for Modena of Serie B to seek more first team chance., signed a two-year contract

In January 2006, he joined Livorno of Serie A. In January 2007, he was transferred to Frosinone (Serie B). In August 2007, to Cremonese of Serie C1.

== Honours ==
Siena

- Serie C1: 1999–2000
- Serie B: 2002–03
