= Bruno Giorgi (footballer) =

Italian footballer and manager (1940-2010)

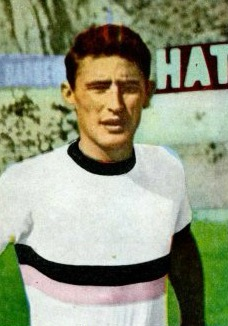

Personal information
- Date of birth: 20 November 1940
- Place of birth: Pavia, Italy
- Date of death: 22 September 2010 (aged 69)
- Place of death: Reggio Emilia, Italy
- Height: 1.76 m (5 ft 9 1/2 in)
- Position: Full back

Senior career*
Years	Team	Apps	(Gls)
1962–1966	Palermo	111	(1)
1966–1972	Reggiana	203	(0)

Managerial career
- 1975–1976: Reggiana
- 1976–1977: Empoli
- 1977–1979: Nocerina
- 1980–1981: Campobasso
- 1981–1982: Modena
- 1982–1983: Padova
- 1983–1986: Vicenza
- 1986–1988: Brescia
- 1988–1989: Cosenza
- 1989–1990: Fiorentina
- 1990–1992: Atalanta
- 1992–1993: Genoa
- 1993–1994: Cagliari
- 1996: Cagliari
- * Club domestic league appearances and goals

Bruno Giorgi (20 November 1940 – 22 September 2010) was an Italian football player and manager who played as a defender.

== Career ==
After an unremarkable career with teams such as Palermo and Reggiana, Giorgi became a football coach. In 1989, after several experiences in minor league football (including a stint at Vicenza during which he had the opportunity to launch a young Roberto Baggio into his early footsteps into first team football), and immediately after narrowly missing top flight promotion with Serie B outsiders Cosenza, he took the head coaching job at Fiorentina (also, his first Serie A job) where he performed badly at domestic league level but also leading the club to the 1989–90 UEFA Cup final, being however removed from his position before the two-legged final itself was actually played.

In 1993, he was appointed head coach of Cagliari, an experience that ended after only one season with a remarkable 1993–94 UEFA Cup semi-final. He returned briefly at Cagliari in 1996 to replace Giovanni Trapattoni, and successively retired from football altogether.

== Death ==
On 29 September 2010, it was revealed that Bruno Giorgi had died exactly a week earlier in a Reggio Emilia clinic.
