= 1982–83 Serie C1 =

Italian football league season

The 1982–83 Serie C1 was the fifth edition of Serie C1, the third highest league in the Italian football league system.

== Overview ==
=== Serie C1/A ===
It was contested by 18 teams, and Triestina won the championship. It was decided that Triestina, Padova was promoted to Serie B, and Piacenza, Mestre, Pro Patria, Forlì was demoted in Serie C2.

=== Serie C1/B ===
It was contested by 18 teams, and Empoli won the championship. It was decided that Empoli, Pescara was promoted to Serie B, and Livorno, Reggina, Paganese, Latina was demoted in Serie C2.

== League standings ==
=== Serie C1/A ===
Pos	Team	Pts
1	Triestina (P)	47
2	Padova (P)	43
3	Carrarese	40
4	Lanerossi Vicenza	37
5	Rimini	37
6	Parma	34
7	Fano	33
7	Trento	33
7	Spal	33
10	Treviso	33
11	Brescia	32
12	Sanremese	32
13	Modena	32
14	Rondinella Marzocco	32
15	Piacenza (R)	32
16	Mestre (R)	30
16	Pro Patria (R)	30
18	Forlì (R)	22

Source: rsssf.com
(P) Promoted; (R) Relegated

=== Serie C1/B ===
Pos	Team	Pts
1	Empoli (P)	46
2	Pescara (P)	46
3	Campania	45
4	Taranto	45
5	Casertana	36
6	Cosenza	36
7	Salernitana	35
8	Barletta	34
9	Virtus Casarano	31
10	Rende	31
11	Benevento	31
12	Ancona	31
13	Siena	30
14	Ternana	30
15	Livorno (R)	30
13	Reggina (R)	30
17	Paganese (R)	23
18	Latina (R)	22

Source: rsssf.com
(P) Promoted; (R) Relegated
