= SSD Jesina Calcio =

Jesina
- Full name: Società Sportiva Dilettantistica Jesina Calcio
- Nicknames: I Leoncelli (The Little Lions); I Rossi (The Reds)
- Founded: 1927
- Ground: Stadio Pacifico Carotti, Jesi, Italy
- Capacity: 5,000
- Chairman: Gianfilippo Mosconi
- Manager: Omar Manuelli
- League: Serie D/F
- 2018–19: 15th
| Home colours | Away colours |

Società Sportiva Dilettantistica Jesina Calcio is an Italian association football club located in Jesi, Marche. It currently plays in Serie D.

== History ==
=== Foundation ===
Unione Sportiva Jesina was born on 15 March 1927 by the merger of Juventus Aesina and SS Mazzini Jesi. The first official match was played against Fano, resulting in a 6–6 draw. In December 1930 the club changed its name and became Associazione Sportiva Jesi. In 1933 the club was promoted to the third tier Serie C, a division where the Leoncelli played until World War II, giving the town of Jesi matches against major city teams such as Taranto, Pescara, Venezia, Vicenza, Udinese and Padova.

=== From 1945 to 1978 ===
After the war the club changed its name to Società Sportiva Jesina. Except for the 1953–1954 season, Jesina established as a Fourth Tier team with sporadic appearances to Serie C. It was not until the end of the 1975–1976 season that the team was relegated to the regional championship.

=== The Golden Era (1978–1991) ===
Then Leopoldo Latini, a local businessman, took over the club. In few years promotion to Serie D was achieved and 1981 the team regained professional status winning a promotion playoff in Arezzo against Riccione. Serie C was recently split into two divisions and Jesina performed well in Serie C2 until 1983–1984 when they were crowned champions and were promoted to Serie C1. Jesina were one of the best 72 teams in the country. The fairytale ended after only 1 year, the team were relegated after losing their head-to-head matches against SPAL. The swan song of the Latini era comes the next year, when Jesina loses the final of Coppa Italia di Serie C against Virescit Boccaleone. In those days, Luca Marchegiani wore the biancorossi shirt and a young Roberto Baggio was an opponent. At the end of the 1990–1991 season, the team lose after penalty kicks a relegation playout and financial crisis sends Jesina another division down returning to the regional championship.

=== From 1991 to Our Days ===
It takes 3 years before Jesina wins the new Eccellenza championship and gets promoted back to Serie D. In 1996–1997 the club had a feud with Astrea for promotion to Serie C2 but at the end came in second place. At the end of the 2001–2002 season the club fall back into Eccellenza. Than a decade of frustration came with many promotion playoffs failures, many times against smaller or rival teams such Cingolana, Centobuchi, Elpidiense Cascinare or Vigor Senigallia. 2009–2010 proved to be the year of redemption with the team winning the regional playoffs with a memorable 3–2 victory against the soon to be Piano San Lazzaro, and getting a reprieve to Serie D after losing in the national playoffs finals.

The first season back in Serie D was great with the club leading the table for many days in the first part of the championship.

The derby against their fierce rivals returns in the 2011–2012 season for the first time since the glorious Serie C1 year. Jesina established in Serie D in the last years, and since Serie C2 got disbanded, the club plays in the fourth tier without promotions targets but staying away from the relegation danger with a politics of giving much game time as possible to local young guys. In 2017 the club celebrates his 90th birthday with renovated hopes for a future promotion to third tier Serie C.

== Colors and badge ==
Jesina's traditional kit consists of a Red shirt paired with White shorts and Red socks. It's not uncommon for the shorts to be Red during some seasons.

== Honours ==
- Serie C2 – 1983–1984
- Promozione – 1948–1949
- Serie D – 1964–1965
- Regional Marche First Tier Championship – 1932–1933, 1953–1954, 1978–1979, 1993–1994
- Regional Coppa Italia Marche – 2008–2009
