= 1983–84 Serie C1 =

Italian football league season

The 1983–84 Serie C1 was the sixth edition of Serie C1, the third highest league in the Italian football league system.

== Overview ==
=== Serie C1/A ===
It was contested by 18 teams, and Parma won the championship. It was decided that Parma, Bologna was promoted to Serie B, and Prato, Fano, Fanfulla, Trento was demoted in Serie C2.

=== Serie C1/B ===
It was contested by 18 teams, and Bari won the championship. It was decided that Bari, Taranto was promoted to Serie B, and Civitanovese, Siena, Foligno, Rende was demoted in Serie C2.

== League standings ==
=== Serie C1/A ===
Pos	Team	Pts
1	Parma	48
2	Bologna	48
3	Lanerossi Vicenza	47
4	Carrarese	39
5	Brescia	39
6	Spal	39
7	Rondinella Marzocco	39
8	Ancona	37
9	Reggiana	34
10	Modena	32
11	Treviso	32
12	Rimini	30
13	Legnano	29
14	Sanremese	29
15	Prato	27
16	Fano	26
17	Fanfulla	25
18	Trento	12

Source: rsssf.com

=== Serie C1/B ===
Pos	Team	Pts
1	Bari	45
2	Taranto	42
3	Francavilla	41
4	Virtus Casarano	41
5	Casertana	37
6	Benevento	36
7	Cosenza	36
8	Salernitana	35
9	Barletta	35
10	Foggia	33
11	Messina	33
12	Akragas	33
13	Campania	32
14	Ternana	32
15	Civitanovese	31
16	Siena	28
17	Foligno	21
18	Rende	21

Source: rsssf.com
