= Franco Cerilli =

Italian footballer

Personal information
- Date of birth: October 26, 1953 (age 73)
- Place of birth: Chioggia, Italy
- Height: 1.74 m (5 ft 8 1/2 in)
- Position: Midfielder

Senior career*
Years	Team	Apps	(Gls)
1969–1972	Sottomarina	35	(4)
1972–1974	Massese	49	(2)
1974–1976	Internazionale	19	(1)
1976–1979	L.R. Vicenza	87	(7)
1977	→ Monza (loan)	4	(0)
1979–1981	Pescara	37	(0)
1981–1984	Padova	97	(3)
1984–1986	L.R. Vicenza	39	(1)
- * Club domestic league appearances and goals

Franco Cerilli (born October 26, 1953) is an Italian former professional footballer who played as a midfielder. He made 90 appearances in Serie A, for Internazionale and Vicenza, and a further 253 in the lower divisions of Italian professional football.

His playing career ended with a five-year ban from football in the Totonero 1986 match-fixing scandal.
