= 1985–86 Serie B =

Italian football league season

Serie B
- Season: 1985–86
- Champions: Ascoli; 2nd title

Serie B 1985-86 team distribution

The Serie B 1985–86 was the fifty-fourth tournament of this competition played in Italy since its creation.

== Teams ==
Brescia, Vicenza, Catanzaro and Palermo had been promoted from Serie C, while Ascoli, Lazio and Cremonese had been relegated from Serie A.

== Classification ==
Results were hugely affected by the 1986 Totonero.

Pos	Team	Pld	W	D	L	GF	GA	GD	Pts	Promotion or relegation
1	Ascoli (P, C)	38	17	16	5	56	33	+23	50	Promotion to Serie A (Note: Empoli promoted after Vicenza’s conviction.)
2	Brescia (P)	38	17	13	8	41	28	+13	47	Promotion to Serie A
3	Lanerossi Vicenza (D)	38	16	14	8	48	33	+15	46	Banned from promotion for match fixing (Note: Totonero 1986: Lanerossi Vicenza originally promoted to Serie A, then sent back to Serie B by the federation for alleged match fixing.)
4	Empoli (P)	38	13	19	6	32	28	+4	45	Promotion to Serie A
5	Triestina	38	15	15	8	40	30	+10	44 (Note: Totonero 1986: 1 point deducted to Triestina)	
6	Bologna	38	15	11	12	37	29	+8	41	
7	Genoa	38	14	12	12	35	31	+4	40	
8	Cesena	38	12	15	11	42	38	+4	39	
9	Cremonese	38	10	17	11	35	31	+4	37	
9	Campobasso	38	9	19	10	30	36	−6	37	
11	Arezzo	38	9	18	11	37	40	−3	36	
11	Lazio	38	11	14	13	38	42	−4	36	
11	Catania	38	12	12	14	30	37	−7	36	
14	Sambenedettese	38	10	15	13	26	26	0	35	
14	Cagliari	38	13	9	16	27	38	−11	35	
16	Palermo (E, R, R)	38	7	20	11	27	35	−8	34	Bankruptcy (Note: Excluded by the FIGC for financial reasons. Palermo was later re-founded in 1987.)
17	Pescara (T)	38	10	13	15	33	37	−4	33	Re-admitted (Note: Originally relegated to Serie C1, then readmitted to Serie B to fill Palermo's vacancy.)
18	Perugia (R, D, R)	38	8	16	14	29	39	−10	32	Relegation to Serie C2 (Note: Totonero 1986: Perugia relegated directly to Serie C2 by the federation for alleged match fixing.)
19	Catanzaro (R)	38	9	12	17	33	45	−12	30	Relegation to Serie C1
20	Monza (R)	38	6	14	18	25	45	−20	26	Relegation to Serie C1

Source: Panini
(C) Champions; (D) Disqualified; (E) Eliminated; (P) Promoted; (R) Relegated; (T) Qualified, but not yet for the particular phase indicated

== Results ==
Home \ Away	ARE	ASC	BOL	BRE	CAG	CAM	CAL	CAT	CES	CRE	EMP	GEN	LRV	LAZ	MON	PAL	PER	PES	SAM	TRI
Arezzo	—	1–1	1–0	1–1	0–0	1–1	1–1	3–0	2–2	1–1	0–2	1–2	1–2	2–1	1–0	0–0	1–0	0–0	2–1	0–0
Ascoli	3–3	—	1–0	3–1	3–0	4–0	2–0	3–2	1–0	1–0	0–0	2–1	1–1	3–2	4–0	3–2	1–1	2–0	0–0	1–1
Bologna	1–1	4–0	—	1–1	0–1	2–1	2–0	2–0	2–1	1–0	1–1	0–0	1–1	1–0	1–0	1–0	4–2	0–0	2–1	1–0
Brescia	3–1	1–0	1–0	—	3–1	1–1	2–0	0–1	2–1	0–0	3–0	1–0	1–0	2–0	2–0	0–0	1–1	1–0	0–1	2–1
Cagliari	0–0	0–2	1–0	2–0	—	3–0	1–0	0–1	2–0	1–0	2–0	1–0	1–0	2–0	1–1	1–0	0–1	0–1	0–1	0–0
Campobasso	1–1	2–2	1–1	0–0	1–0	—	0–0	1–0	0–0	2–1	1–1	1–0	1–0	1–1	2–0	4–1	2–1	1–1	1–0	0–1
Calcio Catania	1–0	0–0	1–0	2–1	2–0	2–0	—	1–0	2–4	1–1	0–1	3–2	1–1	2–1	1–0	1–0	2–1	1–1	1–0	0–2
Catanzaro	2–1	0–0	1–0	0–2	4–0	1–1	2–1	—	2–1	0–2	0–0	1–1	0–2	2–3	0–0	1–1	1–2	3–1	1–0	2–2
Cesena	1–1	1–0	1–1	2–2	0–0	1–1	2–0	2–0	—	0–1	0–1	0–0	1–0	3–1	2–1	1–0	2–0	2–1	1–0	1–1
Cremonese	0–0	1–2	1–2	0–1	0–0	0–0	0–0	0–0	3–2	—	4–0	2–0	2–2	2–1	1–0	1–1	2–1	2–0	1–1	2–2
Empoli	3–2	1–1	1–0	0–0	2–0	0–0	0–0	1–0	2–2	0–0	—	1–0	0–0	2–0	0–1	0–0	1–1	1–0	1–0	3–2
Genoa	1–0	1–0	0–1	1–1	4–1	2–0	1–0	2–0	1–0	2–0	2–2	—	1–0	1–1	1–0	2–0	1–0	0–0	1–2	1–0
L.R. Vicenza	3–1	3–1	3–2	0–0	2–0	1–0	2–0	1–0	0–1	1–1	1–0	1–1	—	2–0	5–3	1–1	1–0	1–1	2–1	0–0
Lazio	2–0	0–0	0–0	4–2	3–1	2–0	1–0	1–0	1–1	0–0	0–0	1–1	3–4	—	0–1	2–1	0–0	2–1	1–0	2–1
Monza	0–0	2–2	0–0	0–0	2–1	0–0	2–1	2–2	3–2	1–1	0–1	0–0	0–1	0–0	—	1–1	1–0	0–0	0–1	0–0
Palermo	0–1	0–0	2–0	2–0	1–1	0–0	0–0	1–0	1–1	2–1	1–1	0–0	1–1	1–1	2–1	—	1–1	2–1	0–0	0–0
Perugia	0–2	0–4	2–0	0–1	1–1	2–1	0–0	2–2	0–0	1–0	1–1	1–1	1–1	0–0	2–1	0–0	—	1–0	0–0	2–0
Pescara	2–2	0–1	2–1	1–2	2–0	2–1	1–1	0–0	1–1	1–0	1–1	3–0	0–0	2–0	3–1	0–1	2–1	—	1–0	1–2
Samb.	0–1	1–1	0–2	0–0	0–0	0–0	2–1	0–0	0–0	1–1	1–1	2–0	1–0	1–1	3–1	4–1	0–0	1–0	—	0–0
Triestina	2–1	1–1	0–0	1–0	1–2	1–1	1–1	3–2	2–0	0–1	1–0	2–1	3–2	0–0	1–0	2–0	1–0	2–0	1–0	—

Legend: Blue = home team win; Yellow = draw; Red = away team win.

== Attendances ==
#	Club	Average
1	Lazio	25,872
2	Cagliari	17,053
3	Bologna	16,747
4	Vicenza	16,501
5	Brescia	15,016
6	Genoa	14,878
7	Palermo	13,194
8	Ascoli	11,537
9	Triestina	11,352
10	Perugia	10,432
11	Cremonese	8,979
12	Cesena	8,546
13	Sambenedettese	7,760
14	Catania	7,406
15	Pescara	7,397
16	Catanzaro	6,595
17	Arezzo	6,300
18	Campobasso	6,046
19	Empoli	4,692
20	Monza	3,542

== References and sources ==
- Almanacco Illustrato del Calcio - La Storia 1898-2004, Panini Edizioni, Modena, September 2005

Specific
