= Serie C1 =

- Founded: 1978 as Serie C1; Lega Pro Prima Divisione from 2008
- Folded: 2014
- Country: Italy
- Other club from: San Marino
- Confederation: Lega Pro (FIGC)
- Number of clubs: 36 (in two groups)
- Level on pyramid: 3
- Promotion to: Serie B
- Relegation to: Serie C2
- Domestic cup(s): Coppa Italia Serie C Supercoppa di Lega Serie C
- Most championships: Catanzaro and Ravenna (3 each)
- Website: www.lega-pro.com

Serie C1 was the third highest football league and second lowest professional league in Italy. It consisted of 36 teams, divided geographically into two divisions.

== History ==
Before the 1978–79 season, there were only three professional football leagues in Italy, the third being Serie C. The league managing the C was also organizing the semi-professional Serie D. In 1978, it was decided to split the Serie C into Serie C1 (the third highest league) and Serie C2, that included the worst C and the best D clubs. Upon its inception in 1978–79, Serie C1 consisted of two groups of 18 teams, with two promotions and four relegations. During the season, teams only played the other teams in their division, according to the round robin method. The remnants of the Serie D were later, in 1981, moved to the amatorial sector as Campionato Interregionale.

Play-offs were introduced in 1992, together with the 3-victory-points rule. In each division, two teams were promoted to Serie B, and three teams were relegated to Serie C2. In total, the league promoted 4 teams to Serie B and relegated 6 teams to C2. The team finishing first in the regular season was directly promoted to Serie B, while teams placing 2nd to 5th were entered into a play-off semi-final for the chance of gaining the second promotional spot for that particular division. From 2000, the overall champions were decided through the Supercoppa di Serie C. From 2008 the competition was known as Lega Pro Prima Divisione.

The reform decided by the FIGC led to the reunification with the Serie C2 starting from 2014-2015 and with the subsequent rebirth of the third division championship with 60 teams divided into three groups of 20 as Serie C.

== Past champions ==
Source for league winners:

Group A

Season	Winner	Runner up
1978–79	Como	Parma
1979–80	Varese	Rimini
1980–81	Reggiana	Cremonese
1981–82	Atalanta	Monza
1982–83	Triestina	Padova
1983–84	Parma	Bologna
1984–85	Brescia	Lanerossi Vicenza
1985–86	Parma	Modena
1986–87	Piacenza	Padova
1987–88	Ancona	Monza
1988–89	Reggiana	Triestina
1989–90	Modena	Lucchese
1990–91	Piacenza	Venezia
1991–92	SPAL	Monza
1992–93	Ravenna	Vicenza

Group B

Season	Winner	Runner up
1978–79	Matera	Pisa
1979–80	Catania	Foggia
1980–81	Cavese	Sambenedettese
1981–82	Arezzo	Campobasso
1982–83	Empoli	Pescara
1983–84	Bari	Taranto
1984–85	Catanzaro	Palermo
1985–86	Messina	Taranto
1986–87	Catanzaro	Barletta
1987–88	Licata	Cosenza
1988–89	Cagliari	Foggia
1989–90	Taranto	Salernitana
1990–91	Casertana	Palermo
1991–92	Ternana	Fidelis Andria
1992–93	Palermo	Acireale

Season	Winner	Playoff Winner
1993–94	Chievo	Como
1994–95	Bologna	Pistoiese
1995–96	Ravenna	Empoli
1996–97	Treviso	Monza
1997–98	Cesena	Cremonese
1998–99	Alzano Virescit	Pistoiese
1999–00	Siena	Cittadella
2000–01	Modena	Como
2001–02	Livorno	Triestina
2002–03	Treviso	AlbinoLeffe
2003–04	Arezzo	Cesena
2004–05	Cremonese	Mantova
2005–06	Spezia	Genoa
2006–07	Grosseto	Pisa
2007–08	Sassuolo	Cittadella

Season	Winner	Playoff Winner
1993–94	Perugia	Salernitana
1994–95	Reggina	Avellino
1995–96	Lecce	Castel di Sangro
1996–97	Fidelis Andria	Ancona
1997–98	Cosenza	Ternana
1998–99	Fermana	Savoia
1999–00	Crotone	Ancona
2000–01	Palermo	Messina
2001–02	Ascoli	Catania
2002–03	Avellino	Pescara
2003–04	Catanzaro	Crotone
2004–05	Rimini	Avellino
2005–06	Napoli	Frosinone
2006–07	Ravenna	Avellino
2007–08	Salernitana	Ancona

=== Lega Pro Prima Divisione ===
Group A

Season	Winner	Playoff Winner
2008–09	Cesena	Padova
2009–10	Novara	Varese
2010–11	Gubbio	Verona
2011–12	Ternana	Pro Vercelli
2012–13	Trapani	Carpi
2013–14	Virtus Entella	Pro Vercelli

Group B

Season	Winner	Playoff Winner
2008–09	Gallipoli	Crotone
2009–10	Portogruaro	Pescara
2010–11	Nocerina	Juve Stabia
2011–12	Spezia	Virtus Lanciano
2012–13	Avellino	Latina
2013–14	Perugia	Frosinone
