= 1996 Coppa Italia final =

48th Coppa Italia final
- Event: 1995–96 Coppa Italia
Fiorentina	Atalanta
3	0

First leg
Fiorentina	Atalanta
1	0
- Date: 2 May 1996
- Venue: Stadio Artemio Franchi, Florence
- Referee: Robert Boggi
- Attendance: 39,992

Second leg
Atalanta	Fiorentina
0	2
- Date: 18 May 1996
- Venue: Stadio Atleti Azzurri d'Italia, Bergamo
- Referee: Pierluigi Pairetto
- Attendance: 25,977

The 1996 Coppa Italia final was the final of the 1995–96 Coppa Italia, the top cup competition in Italian football. The match was played over two legs on 2 and 18 May 1996 between Fiorentina and Atalanta. The final was won by Fiorentina, who claimed their fifth Coppa Italia title with a 3–0 aggregate victory.

== First leg ==
2 May 1996
21:00

Fiorentina	1–0	Atalanta
Batistuta 52'

Artemio Franchi, Florence
Attendance: 39,992
Referee: Robert Boggi

Fiorentina	Atalanta

GK	1	(Italy) Francesco Toldo
RB	2	(Italy) Daniele Carnasciali
CB	5	(Italy) Lorenzo Amoruso
CB	19	(Italy) Pasquale Padalino
LB	20	(Italy) Andrea Sottil		(substituted off) 85'
RM	7	(Sweden) Stefan Schwarz
CM	4	(Italy) Giovanni Piacentini
CM	11	(Italy) Massimo Orlando	Booked	(substituted off) 46'
LM	10	(Portugal) Rui Costa
RF	23	(Italy) Anselmo Robbiati
LF	9	(Argentina) Gabriel Batistuta (c)
Substitutes:
MF	17	(Italy) Emiliano Bigica		(substituted on) 85'
FW	18	(Italy) Giacomo Banchelli		(substituted on) 46'
Manager:
(Italy) Claudio Ranieri

GK	1	(Italy) Fabrizio Ferron
RB	2	(Uruguay) José Herrera
CB	9	(Uruguay) Paolo Montero
CB	11	(Italy) Antonio Paganin	Booked
LB	13	(Italy) Cristiano Pavone		(substituted off) 79'
CM	19	(Italy) Mauro Valentini
CM	10	(Italy) Domenico Morfeo
RM	3	(Italy) Walter Bonacina
AM	5	(Italy) Daniele Fortunato (c)
LM	6	(Italy) Fabio Gallo	Booked	(substituted off) 79'
CF	18	(Italy) Sandro Tovalieri		(substituted off) 84'
Substitutes:
MF	16	(Italy) Stefano Salvatori		(substituted on) 79'
MF	17	(Italy) Marco Sgrò		(substituted on) 79'
FW		(Italy) Federico Pisani		(substituted on) 84'
Manager:
(Italy) Emiliano Mondonico

== Second leg ==
18 May 1996
21:00

Atalanta	0–2	Fiorentina
		L. Amoruso 48'; Batistuta 61'

Stadio Atleti Azzurri d'Italia, Bergamo
Attendance: 25,977
Referee: Pierluigi Pairetto

Atalanta	Fiorentina

GK	1	(Italy) Fabrizio Ferron
RB	2	(Uruguay) José Herrera
CB	19	(Italy) Mauro Valentini
CB	11	(Italy) Antonio Paganin	Booked	(substituted off) 49'
LB	9	(Uruguay) Paolo Montero
MF	13	(Italy) Cristiano Pavone		(substituted off) 59'
MF	6	(Italy) Fabio Gallo
MF	3	(Italy) Walter Bonacina
MF	5	(Italy) Daniele Fortunato (c)
FW	18	(Italy) Sandro Tovalieri
FW	10	(Italy) Domenico Morfeo
Substitutes:
MF	22	(Italy) Filippo Zani
MF	16	(Italy) Stefano Salvatori		(substituted on) 67'
MF	17	(Italy) Marco Sgrò
MF	15	(Italy) Franco Rotella		(substituted on) 49'
MF	30	(Italy) Gianluca Temelin		(substituted on) 59'
Manager:
(Italy) Emiliano Mondonico

GK	1	(Italy) Francesco Toldo		(substituted off) 89'
RB	2	(Italy) Daniele Carnasciali
CB	6	(Italy) Alberto Malusci	Booked
CB	4	(Italy) Giovanni Piacentini
LB	5	(Italy) Lorenzo Amoruso
MF	19	(Italy) Pasquale Padalino	Booked
MF	14	(Italy) Sandro Cois
MF	17	(Italy) Emiliano Bigica
MF	10	(Portugal) Rui Costa
FW	9	(Argentina) Gabriel Batistuta (c)
FW	21	(Italy) Francesco Flachi	Booked	(substituted off) 63'
Substitutes:
GK	22	(Italy) Gianmatteo Mareggini		(substituted on) 89'
MF	20	(Italy) Andrea Sottil
FW	11	(Italy) Massimo Orlando		(substituted on) 88'
MF	23	(Italy) Anselmo Robbiati		(substituted on) 63'	(substituted off) 88'
FW	18	(Italy) Giacomo Banchelli
Manager:
(Italy) Claudio Ranieri

== See also ==
- 1995–96 Atalanta BC season
- 1995–96 AC Fiorentina season
