= 1995–96 Atalanta BC season =

Atalanta
1995–96 season
- President: Ivan Ruggeri
- Manager: Emiliano Mondonico
- Stadium: Stadio Atleti Azzurri d'Italia
- Serie A: 13th
- Coppa Italia: Runners-up
- Top goalscorer: League: Domenico Morfeo (11); All: Domenico Morfeo (12)
Home colours	Away colours

During the 1995–96 season Atalanta Bergamasca Calcio competed in Serie A and Coppa Italia.

== Summary ==
The club sold Argentine midfielder Leo Rodriguez to Universidad de Chile and young star striker Maurizio Ganz to Inter Milan, meanwhile bought Sandro Tovalieri from Bari and Christian Vieri from Torino to balance the offensive line. Additionally, central back José Herrera arrived from Cagliari Calcio and young midfielder Tomas Locatelli moved to AC Milan.

The club reached as high as third in the table in December with four consecutive wins. After that though, the club lost six matches, sending the club down the table to the relegation zone. The club secured safety from relegation during the final rounds. Striker Christian Vieri and attacking midfielder Domenico Morfeo both scored 22 goals during the season.

In the Coppa Italia, the squad reached the final for the first time in nine years. Along the way, Atalanta defeated Cremonese, Juventus by a goal from Fabio Gallo, Cagliari in the quarter-finals and Bologna in the semi-finals. They lost the two-legged final against Fiorentina by an aggregate score of 3–0.

== Squad ==
Note: Flags indicate national team as defined under FIFA eligibility rules; some limited exceptions apply. Players may hold more than one non-FIFA nationality.

No.	Pos.	Nation	Player
1	GK	ITA	Fabrizio Ferron
2	MF	URU	José Herrera
3	MF	ITA	Valter Bonacina (vice-Captain)
4	DF	ITA	Nicola Boselli
5	MF	ITA	Daniele Fortunato (Captain)
6	MF	ITA	Fabio Gallo
7	DF	ITA	Gianluca Luppi
8	MF	ITA	Giuseppe Minaudo
9	DF	URU	Paolo Montero
10	MF	ITA	Domenico Morfeo
11	DF	ITA	Antonio Paganin
12	GK	ITA	Davide Pinato
13	DF	ITA	Cristiano Pavone

No.	Pos.	Nation	Player
14	FW	ITA	Federico Pisani
15	MF	ITA	Franco Rotella
16	MF	ITA	Stefano Salvatori
17	MF	ITA	Marco Sgrò
18	FW	ITA	Sandro Tovalieri
19	DF	ITA	Mauro Valentini
20	FW	ITA	Christian Vieri
21	DF	ITA	Marco Zanchi
22	GK	ITA	Filippo Zani
27	DF	SLE	Kewullay Conteh
28	MF	ITA	Massimo Mutarelli
30	FW	ITA	Gianluca Temelin
31	DF	ITA	Stefano Lorenzi
—	DF	ITA	Denis Zanardo

=== Transfers ===
In
Pos.	Name	from	Type
FW	Sandro Tovalieri	Bari	
DF	José Herrera	Cagliari	
DF	Antonio Paganin	Inter Milan	loan ended
DF	Gianluca Luppi	Fiorentina	
FW	Christian Vieri	Venezia	
GK	Marco Ambrosio	Prato	loan ended
DF	Kewullay Conteh	Café Opera	
MF	Fabio Gallo	Brescia	
MF	Giuseppe Minaudo	Piacenza	loan ended
MF	Marco Sgrò	Ancona	loan ended

Out
Pos.	Name	To	Type
FW	Maurizio Ganz	Inter Milan	
MF	Tomas Locatelli	AC Milan	loan
DF	Tebaldo Bigliardi	Leffe	
DF	Simone Pavan	Venezia	
DF	Emanuele Tresoldi	Pistoiese	loan
MF	Oscar Magoni	Genoa	
MF	Leonardo Rodríguez	Universidad de Chile	
MF	Cristiano Scapolo	Bologna	
MF	Sebastiano Vecchiola	Venezia	
FW	Vincenzo Chianese	Casarano	loan
FW	Giampaolo Saurini	Brescia	

=== Autumn ===
Out
Pos.	Name	To	Type
GK	Marco Ambrosio	Ravenna	
MF	Giuseppe Minaudo	Torino	

== Competitions ==
=== Serie A ===
==== League table ====
Pos	Team	Pld	W	D	L	GF	GA	GD	Pts	Qualification or relegation
11	Udinese	34	11	8	15	41	49	−8	41	
12	Napoli	34	10	11	13	28	41	−13	41	
13	Atalanta	34	11	6	17	38	50	−12	39	
14	Piacenza	34	9	10	15	31	48	−17	37	
15	Bari (R)	34	8	8	18	49	71	−22	32	Relegation to Serie B

Source: 1995–96 Serie A, RSSSF.com, Soccerway
Rules for classification: 1) Points; 2) Head-to-head points; 3) Head-to-head goal difference; 4) Goal difference; 5) Goals scored; 6) Draw. (Note: Head-to-head record is used only after all the matches between the teams in question have been played).
(R) Relegated

==== Results by round ====
Round	1	2	3	4	5	6	7	8	9	10	11	12	13	14	15	16	17	18	19	20	21	22	23	24	25	26	27	28	29	30	31	32	33	34
Ground	H	A	H	A	H	H	A	H	A	H	A	H	A	H	A	H	A	A	H	A	H	A	A	H	A	H	A	H	A	H	A	H	A	H
Result	D	W	L	L	W	D	D	D	W	W	W	W	L	L	L	L	L	L	W	L	L	D	L	D	L	L	W	W	L	W	L	L	L	W
Position	7	4	8	11	8	8	9	9	8	7	3	3	4	5	7	9	11	12	10	11	12	13	13	13	14	13	11	12	13	11	12	13	14	13

Source: Competitive matches
A = Away; H = Home; W = Win; D = Draw; L = Loss; = Leader, 1996–97 UEFA Champions League Group stage; = 1996–97 UEFA Cup First round

==== Matches ====
27 August 1995 1	Atalanta	1–1	Parma	Bergamo
		Report		Stadium: Stadio Atleti Azzurri d'Italia

10 September 1995 2	Roma	0–1	Atalanta	Rome
		Report		Stadium: Stadio Olimpico

17 September 1995 3	Atalanta	1–3	Napoli	Bergamo
		Report		Stadium: Stadio Atleti Azzurri d'Italia

24 September 1995 4	AC Milan	3–0	Atalanta	Milan
		Report		Stadium: Stadio San Siro

1 October 1995 5	Atalanta	2–0	Piacenza	Bergamo
		Report		Stadium: Stadio Atleti Azzurri d'Italia

15 October 1995 6	Atalanta	1–1	Inter	Bergamo
		Report		Stadium: Stadio Atleti Azzurri d'Italia

22 October 1995 7	Cremonese	1–1	Atalanta	Cremona
		Report		Stadium: Stadio Pino Zaccheria

29 October 1995 8	Atalanta	0–0	Udinese	Bergamo
		Report		Stadium: Stadio Atleti Azzurri d'Italia

5 November 1995 9	Bari	1–3	Atalanta	Bari
		Report		Stadium: Stadio San Nicola

19 November 1995 10	Atalanta	3–2	Sampdoria	Bergamo
		Report		Stadium: Stadio Atleti Azzurri d'Italia

26 November 1995 11	Torino	0–1	Atalanta	Turin
		Report		Stadium: Stadio delle Alpi

3 December 1995 12	Atalanta	3–1	Vicenza	Bergamo
		Report		Stadium: Stadio Atleti Azzurri d'Italia

10 December 1995 13	Cagliari	2–0	Atalanta	Cagliari
		Report		Stadium: Stadio Sant'Elia

17 December 1995 14	Atalanta	1–3	Fiorentina	Bergamo
		Report		Stadium: Stadio Atleti Azzurri d'Italia

23 December 1995 15	Lazio	5–1	Atalanta	Rome
		Report		Stadium: Stadio Olimpico

7 January 1996 16	Atalanta	0–1	Juventus	Bergamo
		Report		Stadium: Stadio Atleti Azzurri d'Italia

14 January 1996 17	Padova	3–2	Atalanta	Padua
		Report

21 January 1996 18	Parma	2–0	Atalanta	Parma
		Report		Stadium: Stadio Ennio Tardini

28 January 1996 19	Atalanta	2–1	Roma	Bergamo
		Report		Stadium: Stadio Atleti Azzurri d'Italia

4 February 1996 20	Napoli	2–0	Atalanta	Naples
		Report		Stadium: Stadio San Paolo

11 February 1996 21	Atalanta	0–1	AC Milan	Bergamo
		Report		Stadium: Stadio Atleti Azzurri d'Italia

18 February 1996 22	Piacenza	2–2	Atalanta	Piacenza
		Report

25 February 1996 23	Inter Milan	1–0	Atalanta	Milan
		Report		Stadium: Stadio San Siro

3 March 1996 24	Atalanta	1–1	Cremonese	Bergamo
		Report		Stadium: Stadio Atleti Azzurri d'Italia

10 March 1996 25	Udinese	3–0	Atalanta	Udine
		Report		Stadium: Stadio Friuli

10 April 1996 26	Atalanta	1–2	Bari	Bergamo
		Report		Stadium: Stadio Atleti Azzurri d'Italia

24 March 1996 27	Sampdoria	2–3	Atalanta	Genoa
		Report		Stadium: Stadio Luigi Ferraris

31 March 1996 28	Atalanta	1–0	Torino	Bergamo
		Report		Stadium: Stadio Atleti Azzurri d'Italia

6 April 1996 29	Vicenza	1–0	Atalanta	Vicenza
		Report

14 April 1996 30	Atalanta	3–0	Cagliari	Bergamo
		Report		Stadium: Stadio Atleti Azzurri d'Italia

21 April 1996 31	Fiorentina	1–0	Atalanta	Florence
		Report		Stadium: Stadio Artemio Franchi

28 April 1996 32	Atalanta	1–3	Lazio	Bergamo
		Report		Stadium: Stadio Atleti Azzurri d'Italia

5 May 1996 33	Juventus	1–0	Atalanta	Turin
		Report		Stadium: Stadio delle Alpi

12 May 1996 34	Atalanta	3–0	Padova	Bergamo
		Report		Stadium: Stadio Atleti Azzurri d'Italia

-

=== Coppa Italia ===
==== Eightfinals ====
25 October 1995	Atalanta	1–0 (a.e.t.)	Juventus	Bergamo
20:30	Gallo 118'			Stadium: Stadio Atleti Azzurri d'Italia; Referee: Roberto Bettin

==== Quarter-finals ====
29 November 1995 First leg	Cagliari Calcio	1–0	Atalanta	Cagliari
	O'Neill 35'			Stadium: Stadio Sant'Elia; Attendance: 10 000; Referee: Marcello Nicchi

14 December 1995 Second leg	Atalanta	4–2 (4–3 agg.)	Cagliari Calcio	Bergamo
	Tovalieri 18', 83'; Morfeo 24'; F.Pisani 79'		Bressan 47'; D.Silva 76'	Stadium: Stadio Atleti Azzurri d'Italia; Attendance: 13.000; Referee: Fiorenzo Treossi

==== Semi-finals ====
14 February 1996 First leg	Bologna	1–1	Atalanta	Bologna
	Antonio Paganin 50' (o.g.)		Valentini 84'	Stadium: Stadio Renato Dall'Ara; Referee: Marcello Nicchi

27 February 1996 Second leg	Atalanta	2–0 (3–1 agg.)	Bologna	Bergamo
	Vieri 31' 90'			Stadium: Stadio Atleti Azzurri d'Italia; Attendance: 12,428; Referee: Loris Stafoggia

==== Final ====
2 May 1996 First leg	Fiorentina	1–0	Atalanta	Florence
21:00	Batistuta 52'			Stadium: Stadio Artemio Franchi; Attendance: 39,992; Referee: Robert Boggi

18 May 1996 Second leg	Atalanta	0–2 (0–3 agg.)	Fiorentina	Bergamo
21:00			L. Amoruso 48'; Batistuta 61'	Stadium: Stadio Atleti Azzurri d'Italia; Attendance: 25,977; Referee: Pierluigi Pairetto

== Statistics ==
=== Squad statistics ===
Competition	Points	Home						Away						Total						GD
Competition	Points	G	W	D	L	Gs	Ga	G	W	D	L	Gs	Ga	G	W	D	L	Gs	Ga	GD
Serie A	39	17	7	4	6	24	20	17	4	2	11	14	30	34	11	6	17	38	50	-12
Coppa Italia		5	3	1	1	9	6	3	0	1	2	1	3	8	3	2	3	10	9	+1

=== Player statistics ===
No.	Pos	Nat	Player	Total		Serie A		Coppa Italia	
No.	Pos	Nat	Player	Apps	Goals	Apps	Goals	Apps	Goals
1	GK	(Italy) ITA	Ferron	36	-41	29	-41	7	0
2	DF	(Uruguay) URU	Herrera	36	2	28+1	2	7	0
19	DF	(Italy) ITA	Valentini	33	1	26+1	0	6	1
11	DF	(Italy) ITA	Paganin	35	0	25+2	0	8	0
9	DF	(Uruguay) URU	Montero	29	0	23	0	6	0
3	MF	(Italy) ITA	Bonacina	35	1	28+1	0	6	1
5	MF	(Italy) ITA	Fortunato	40	2	32	2	8	0
6	MF	(Italy) ITA	Gallo	37	1	25+6	0	6	1
18	FW	(Italy) ITA	Tovalieri	38	8	21+9	6	8	2
20	FW	(Italy) ITA	Vieri	21	10	18+1	8	2	2
10	FW	(Italy) ITA	Morfeo	37	12	23+7	11	7	1
12	GK	(Italy) ITA	Pinato	8	-9	5+2	-9	1	0
17	MF	(Italy) ITA	Sgro	36	2	21+9	1	6	1
7	DF	(Italy) ITA	Luppi	20	0	14+3	0	3	0
14	FW	(Italy) ITA	Pisani	32	5	11+15	4	6	1
15	MF	(Italy) ITA	Rotella	22	0	10+7	0	5	0
13	DF	(Italy) ITA	Pavone	18	0	10+4	0	4	0
16	MF	(Italy) ITA	Salvatori	28	0	9+13	0	6	0
4	DF	(Italy) ITA	Boselli	17	0	8+7	0	2	0
21	DF	(Italy) ITA	Zanchi	12	0	6+4	0	2	0
8	MF	(Italy) ITA	Minaudo	3	0	1+1	0	1	0
27	DF	(Sierra Leone) SLE	Conteh	2	0	1+1	0	0	0
22	GK	(Italy) ITA	Zani	1	0	0+1	0	0	0
28	MF	(Italy) ITA	Mutarelli	1	0	0+1	0	0	0
30	FW	(Italy) ITA	Temelin	2	0	0+1	0	1	0
		(Italy) ITA	Zanardo	1	0	0	0	1	0
31	DF	(Italy) ITA	Lorenzi	0	0	0	0	0	0

- Source: http://calcio-seriea.net/

== Bibliography ==
- Elio Corbani; Pietro Serina. Cent'anni di Atalanta, 2007 (in Italian). SESAAB from Bergamo. ISBN 978-88-903088-0-2.
