= 1996–97 Atalanta BC season =

Atalanta
1996–97 season
- President: Ivan Ruggeri
- Manager: Emiliano Mondonico
- Stadium: Stadio Atleti Azzurri d'Italia
- Serie A: 10th
- Coppa Italia: First round
- Top goalscorer: League: Filippo Inzaghi (24); All: Filippo Inzaghi (25)
Home colours	Away colours

During the 1996–97 season Atalanta Bergamasca Calcio competed in Serie A and the Coppa Italia.

== Summary ==
The squad finished in 10th place in Serie A. Striker Filippo Inzaghi became capocannoniere with 24 goals in 33 league matches for Atalanta, defeating Sampdoria striker Vincenzo Montella. Inzaghi tied Michel Platini's 1983-84 Serie A record, scoring against 15 different teams in the competition. Also, goalkeeper Davide Pinato attained a new club record: 757 minutes without conceding a goal.

On 12 February 1997, forward Federico Pisani died in a car accident with his BMW 320 convertible in the company of his girlfriend Alessandra Midali (who also died in the accident) and two friends (who were uninjured). In his honor, the club's number 14 was retired, and the Curva Nord (North stand) of the Stadio Atleti Azzurri d'Italia was named the Curva Pisani.

== Squad ==
Note: Flags indicate national team as defined under FIFA eligibility rules; some limited exceptions apply. Players may hold more than one non-FIFA nationality.

No.	Pos.	Nation	Player
1	GK	ITA	Davide Micillo
2	MF	URU	José Herrera
3	MF	ITA	Valter Bonacina
4	DF	ITA	Massimo Carrera
5	MF	ITA	Fortunato
6	DF	YUG	Zoran Mirković
7	FW	URU	Federico Magallanes
8	MF	SWE	Joakim Persson
9	FW	ITA	Filippo Inzaghi
10	MF	ITA	Domenico Morfeo
11	MF	ITA	Fabio Gallo
12	GK	ITA	Davide Pinato
13	DF	ITA	Andrea Sottil
14	FW	ITA	Federico Pisani
15	MF	ITA	Marco Sgrò
17	DF	ITA	Emanuele Tresoldi

No.	Pos.	Nation	Player
18	DF	ITA	Paolo Foglio
19	DF	ITA	Stefano Rossini
20	MF	ITA	Franco Rotella
21	MF	ITA	Gianluca Luppi
22	GK	ITA	Andrea Natali
23	DF	ITA	Fabio Rustico
24	FW	ITA	Fausto Rossini
25	FW	ITA	Gianluigi Lentini
26	MF	ITA	Mario Morfeo
27	MF	ITA	Massimo Mutarelli
28	FW	ITA	Alessandro Marcandalli
29	MF	ITA	Angelo Carbone
30	DF	ITA	Arnaldo Bonfanti
31	DF	ITA	Pierre Giorgio Regonesi
32	MF	ITA	Luciano Zauri
—	DF	ITA	Cesare Natali

=== Transfers ===
In
Pos.	Name	from	Type
FW	Filippo Inzaghi	A.C. Parma	
MF	Gianluigi Lentini	A.C. Milan	
DF	Massimo Carrera	Juventus	
DF	Zoran Mirkovic	FK Partizan	
DF	Stefano Rossini	Piacenza Calcio	
GK	Davide Micillo	A.C. Cesena	
FW	Federico Magallanes	Peñarol	
MF	Joakim Persson	Malmö FF	
DF	Andrea Sottil	Fiorentina	

Out
Pos.	Name	To	Type
FW	Christian Vieri	Juventus	
FW	Sandro Tovalieri	A.C. Reggiana	
DF	Paolo Montero	Juventus	
GK	Fabrizio Ferron	Sampdoria	
DF	Antonio Paganin	Hellas Verona	
MF	Marco Zanchi	A.S. Bari	
MF	Stefano Salvatori	Heart of Midlothian	
DF	Mauro Valentini	Lucchese	

==== Winter ====
In
Pos.	Name	from	Type
MF	Angelo Carbone	A.C. Reggiana	

Out
Pos.	Name	To	Type
DF	José Herrera	Cruz Azul	loan

== Competitions ==
=== Serie A ===
==== League table ====
Pos	Team	Pld	W	D	L	GF	GA	GD	Pts	Qualification or relegation
8	Vicenza	34	12	11	11	43	38	+5	47	Qualification to Cup Winners' Cup
9	Fiorentina	34	10	15	9	46	41	+5	45	
10	Atalanta	34	11	11	12	44	46	−2	44	
11	Milan	34	11	10	13	43	45	−2	43	
12	Roma	34	10	11	13	46	47	−1	41 (Note: Roma finished ahead of Napoli on Goal difference: Roma -1, Napoli -7.)	

Source: Serie A, RSSSF.com, Soccerway
Rules for classification: 1) Points; 2) Head-to-head points; 3) Head-to-head goal difference; 4) Goal difference; 5) Goals scored; 6) Draw. (Note: Head-to-head record is used only after all the matches between the teams in question have been played).

==== Position by round ====
Round	1	2	3	4	5	6	7	8	9	10	11	12	13	14	15	16	17	18	19	20	21	22	23	24	25	26	27	28	29	30	31	32	33	34
Ground	A	H	A	H	A	A	H	A	H	A	H	A	H	A	H	A	H	H	A	H	A	H	H	A	H	A	H	A	H	A	H	A	H	A
Result	L	D	L	D	L	L	W	D	W	L	D	D	W	W	W	D	W	W	D	W	L	D	W	L	L	L	D	W	L	L	L	D	D	W
Position	11	13	15	16	17	18	15	16	15	15	15	15	15	13	11	12	9	6	7	5	6	6	5	6	9	9	8	8	10	11	12	12	11	10

Source: Competitive matches
A = Away; H = Home; W = Win; D = Draw; L = Loss; P = Postponed; = Leader, 1997–98 UEFA Champions League Group stage; = 1997–98 UEFA Champions League Second Qualifying round; = 1997–98 UEFA Cup First round; = 1997–98 Serie B

==== Matches ====
8 September 1996 1	Cagliari	2–0	Atalanta	Cagliari
	Pancaro 3'; Muzzi 86'	Report		Stadium: Stadio Sant'Elia; Referee: Giancarlo Lana

15 September 1996 2	Atalanta	2–2	Fiorentina	Bergamo
	Inzaghi 56' (pen.), 62'	Report	15' Oliveira; 81' Batistuta	Stadium: Stadio Atleti Azzurri d'Italia; Referee: Robert Boggi

22 September 1996 3	Vicenza	4–1	Atalanta	Vicenza
	Viviani 44'; Rossini 45' (o.g.); Beghetto 70'; D'Ignazio Pulpito 85'	Report	40' (pen.) Inzaghi	Stadium: Stadio Romeo Menti; Referee: Massimo De Santis

29 September 1996 4	Atalanta	1–1	Inter	Bergamo
	Inzaghi 86'	Report	44' Djorkaeff	Stadium: Stadio Atleti Azzurri d'Italia; Referee: Pierluigi Pairetto

13 October 1996 5	Perugia	3–1	Atalanta	Perugia
	Dicara 23'; Giunti 68'; Allegri 80' (pen.)	Report	36' Inzaghi	Stadium: Stadio Renato Curi; Referee: Livio Bazzoli

20 October 1996 6	Sampdoria	2–0	Atalanta	Genoa
	Iacopino 11'; Verón 28'	Report		Stadium: Stadio Luigi Ferraris; Referee: Beschin

26 October 1996 7	Atalanta	2–1	Lazio	Bergamo
	Lentini 4'; Inzaghi I 49'	Report	75' Negro	Stadium: Stadio Atleti Azzurri d'Italia; Referee: Graziano Cesari

3 November 1996 8	Milan	1–1	Atalanta	Milan
	Albertini 53' (pen.)	Report	21' Inzaghi I	Stadium: Stadio Giuseppe Meazza; Referee: Roberto Bettin

17 November 1996 9	Atalanta	1–0	Udinese	Bergamo
	Bertotto 29' (o.g.)	Report		Stadium: Stadio Atleti Azzurri d'Italia; Referee: Pasquale Rodomonti

24 November 1996 10	Bologna	3–1	Atalanta	Bologna
	Fortunato 24' (o.g.); Kolyvanov 55'; Bresciani 58'	Report	73' Inzaghi I	Stadium: Stadio Renato Dall'Ara; Referee: Stafoggia

1 December 1996 11	Atalanta	2–2	Napoli	Bergamo
	Morfeo I 40'; Sgrò 75'	Report	46' Aglietti; 50' Caccia	Stadium: Stadio Atleti Azzurri d'Italia; Referee: Stefano Farina

8 December 1996 12	Parma	0–0	Atalanta	Parma
		Report		Stadium: Stadio Ennio Tardini; Referee: Massimo De Santis

15 December 1996 13	Atalanta	4–0	Piacenza	Bergamo
	Inzaghi 15', 31'; Rotella 54'; Sgrò 62'	Report		Stadium: Stadio Atleti Azzurri d'Italia; Referee: Tarcisio Serena

22 December 1996 14	Roma	0–2	Atalanta	Rome
		Report	30' (o.g.) Lanna; 36' Inzaghi	Stadium: Stadio Olimpico; Referee: Cosimo Bolognino

5 January 1997 15	Atalanta	1–0	Hellas Verona	Bergamo
	Magallanes 89'	Report		Stadium: Stadio Atleti Azzurri d'Italia; Referee: Pierluigi Collina

12 January 1997 16	Juventus	0–0	Atalanta	Turin
		Report		Stadium: Stadio delle Alpi; Referee: Pier Paolo Rossi

19 January 1997 17	Atalanta	1–0	Reggiana	Bergamo
	Inzaghi 41'	Report		Stadium: Stadio Atleti Azzurri d'Italia; Referee: Emilio Pellegrino

26 January 1997 18	Atalanta	4–1	Cagliari	Bergamo
	Morfeo I 30', 75' (pen.); Foglio 52'; Inzaghi I 82'	Report	72' Minotti	Stadium: Stadio Atleti Azzurri d'Italia; Referee: Graziano Cesari

2 February 1997 19	Fiorentina	0–0	Atalanta	Florence
		Report		Stadium: Stadio Artemio Franchi; Referee: Gianni Beschin

16 February 1997 20	Atalanta	3–1	Vicenza	Bergamo
	Foglio 58'; Inzaghi 68', 89'	Report	88' (pen.) Otero	Stadium: Stadio Atleti Azzurri d'Italia; Referee: Stefano Braschi

23 February 1997 21	Inter	2–0	Atalanta	Milan
	Djorkaeff 68'; Zamorano 90'	Report		Stadium: Stadio Giuseppe Meazza; Referee: Gennaro Borriello

2 March 1997 22	Atalanta	2–2	Perugia	Bergamo
	Sgrò 76'; Lentini 88'	Report	84' (pen.) Giunti; 87' Negri	Stadium: Stadio Atleti Azzurri d'Italia; Referee: Daniele Tombolini

9 March 1997 23	Atalanta	4–0	Sampdoria	Bergamo
	Inzaghi 20', 29' (pen.), 90'; Morfeo 67' (pen.)	Report		Stadium: Stadio Atleti Azzurri d'Italia; Referee: Salvatore Racalbuto

16 March 1997 24	Lazio	3–2	Atalanta	Rome
	Mirković 36' (o.g.); Sottil 38' (o.g.); Buso 84'	Report	53' Lentini; 83' Morfeo	Stadium: Stadio Olimpico; Referee: Alfredo Trentalange

23 March 1997 25	Atalanta	0–2	Milan	Bergamo
		Report	11' Weah; 66' Eranio	Stadium: Stadio Atleti Azzurri d'Italia; Referee: Piero Ceccarini

6 April 1997 26	Udinese	2–0	Atalanta	Udine
	Bierhoff 81'; Amoroso 84'	Report		Stadium: Stadio Friuli; Referee: Diego Preschern

13 April 1997 27	Atalanta	1–1	Bologna	Bergamo
	Torrisi 50' (o.g.)	Report	72' Scapolo	Stadium: Stadio Atleti Azzurri d'Italia; Referee: Alfredo Trentalange

20 April 1997 28	Napoli	0–1	Atalanta	Naples
		Report	21' Inzaghi	Stadium: Stadio San Paolo; Referee: Daniele Tombolini

4 May 1997 29	Atalanta	1–2	Parma	Bergamo
	Lentini 37'	Report	45' Crespo; 62' Chiesa	Stadium: Stadio Atleti Azzurri d'Italia; Referee: Livio Bazzoli

11 May 1997 30	Piacenza	3–1	Atalanta	Piacenza
	Luiso 15', 61'; Conte 50'	Report	31' Inzaghi	Stadium: Stadio Leonardo Garilli; Referee: Stefano Farina

15 May 1997 31	Atalanta	0–4	Roma	Bergamo
		Report	17' Di Biagio; 22' Balbo; 61' Totti; 78' Thern	Stadium: Stadio Atleti Azzurri d'Italia; Referee: Pasquale Rodomonti

18 May 1997 32	Hellas Verona	1–1	Atalanta	Verona
	Colucci 29'	Report	58' (pen.) Inzaghi	Stadium: Stadio Marcantonio Bentegodi; Referee: Giancarlo Lana

23 May 1997 33	Atalanta	1–1	Juventus	Bergamo
	Inzaghi 19'	Report	54' Iuliano	Stadium: Stadio Atleti Azzurri d'Italia; Referee: Roberto Bettin

1 June 1997 34	Reggiana	0–3	Atalanta	Reggio Emilia
		Report	11' (pen.), 88' (pen.) Inzaghi; 90' Fortunato	Stadium: Stadio Giglio; Referee: Tarcisio Serena

=== Coppa Italia ===
==== First round ====
23 August 1996	SPAL	2–1	Atalanta	Ferrara
	Sorce 15'; Sussi 71'		55' Inzaghi	Stadium: Stadio Paolo Mazza; Referee: Gennaro Borriello

== Statistics ==
=== Squad statistics ===
Competition.	Points	Home						Away						Total						GD
Competition.	Points	G	W	D	L	Gs	Ga	G	W	D	L	Gs	Ga	G	W	D	L	Gs	Ga	GD
Serie A	44	17	8	6	3	30	20	17	3	5	9	14	26	34	11	11	12	44	46	−2
Coppa Italia		–	–	–	–	–	–	1	0	0	1	1	2	1	0	0	1	1	2	−1
Total		17	8	6	3	30	20	18	3	5	10	15	28	35	11	11	13	45	48	−3

=== Players statistics ===
No.	Pos	Nat	Player	Total		Serie A		Coppa Italia	
No.	Pos	Nat	Player	Apps	Goals	Apps	Goals	Apps	Goals
12	GK	(Italy) ITA	Pinato	23	-25	23	-25	0	0
6	DF	(Federal Republic of Yugoslavia) YUG	Mirkovic	22	0	22	0	0	0
4	DF	(Italy) ITA	Carrera	30	0	29	0	1	0
19	DF	(Italy) ITA	Rossini	25	0	20+4	0	1	0
13	DF	(Italy) ITA	Sottil	33	0	32	0	1	0
25	MF	(Italy) ITA	Lentini	31	4	31	4	0	0
3	MF	(Italy) ITA	Bonacina	27	0	25+1	0	1	0
15	MF	(Italy) ITA	Sgro	32	3	30+1	3	1	0
11	MF	(Italy) ITA	Gallo	31	0	26+4	0	1	0
10	MF	(Italy) ITA	Morfeo	27	5	23+3	5	1	0
9	FW	(Italy) ITA	Inzaghi	34	25	32+1	24	1	1
1	GK	(Italy) ITA	Micillo	12	-23	11	-21	1	-2
29	MF	(Italy) ITA	Carbone	19	0	10+9	0	0	0
18	DF	(Italy) ITA	Foglio	24	2	18+6	2	0	0
23	DF	(Italy) ITA	Rustico	24	0	11+13	0	0	0
2	MF	(Uruguay) URU	Herrera	13	0	11+1	0	1	0
5	MF	(Italy) ITA	Fortunato	21	1	9+11	1	1	0
8	MF	(Sweden) SWE	Persson	13	0	4+9	0	0	0
20	MF	(Italy) ITA	Rotella	12	1	3+8	1	1	0
7	FW	(Uruguay) URU	Magallanes	11	1	2+9	1	0	0
21	DF	(Italy) ITA	Luppi	2	0	2	0	0	0
14	FW	(Italy) ITA	Pisani	2	0	0+2	0	0	0
32	MF	(Italy) ITA	Zauri	2	0	0+2	0	0	0
30	DF	(Italy) ITA	Bonfanti	1	0	0+1	0	0	0
26	MF	(Italy) ITA	Morfeo	1	0	0+1	0	0	0
31	DF	(Italy) ITA	Regonesi	1	0	0+1	0	0	0
24	FW	(Italy) ITA	Rossini	2	0	0+1	0	1	0
17	DF	(Italy) ITA	Tresoldi	1	0	0+1	0	0	0

- Source: http://calcio-seriea.net/presenze/1996/1109/

== Bibliography ==
- Elio Corbani; Pietro Serina. Cent'anni di Atalanta, 2007 (in Italian). Sesaab, Bergamo. ISBN 978-88-903088-0-2.
