= Chianese =

Chianese is an Italian surname. Notable people with the surname include:

- Biaggio Chianese (born 1961), Italian boxer
- Dominic Chianese (born 1931), American actor, singer and musician
- Joel Chianese (born 1990), Australian soccer player
- Mario Chianese (died 2020), Italian painter
- Vincenzo Chianese (born 1976), Italian footballer
