= Mauro Valentini =

Mauro Valentini may refer to:

- Mauro Valentini (footballer, born 1964), Italian footballer
- Mauro Valentini (footballer, born 1973), Sammarinese footballer
