= Domenico Morfeo =

Italian footballer (born 1976)

Personal information
- Date of birth: 16 January 1976 (age 50)
- Place of birth: Pescina, Italy
- Height: 1.70 m (5 ft 7 in)
- Position: Attacking midfielder

Senior career*
Years	Team	Apps	(Gls)
1993–1996	Atalanta	83	(22)
1997–2002	Fiorentina	46	(7)
1998–1999	→ AC Milan (loan)	11	(1)
1999–2000	→ Cagliari (loan)	5	(1)
2000	→ Verona (loan)	10	(5)
2001	→ Atalanta (loan)	17	(5)
2002–2003	Inter Milan	17	(1)
2003–2008	Parma	101	(16)
2008–2009	Brescia	0	(0)
2009	Cremonese	4	(0)
2010–2011	San Benedetto dei Marsi		

International career
1995–1997	Italy U21	5	(1)
1996	Italy Olympic	2	(0)
Medal record
Men's football
Representing Italy
UEFA European Under-21 Championship
Winner	1996 Spain
- * Club domestic league appearances and goals

Domenico Morfeo (born 16 January 1976) is an Italian former professional footballer who played as midfielder, usually as an attacking midfielder.

Throughout his career, he played for several clubs in Italy, and also spent short spells at many top Italian clubs. At the international level, he played for the Italy national under-21 team. A highly skilful and creative playmaker, with an eye for goal, he was regarded as one of Italy's most promising players in his youth, but he failed to live up to his potential in his later career.

== Club career ==
=== Early years and emergence with Atalanta ===
Born in Pescina, Abruzzo, after joining the Atalanta BC youth academy in 1988, at the age of 14, Morfeo enjoyed a highly successful youth career with the Bergamo primavera squad, under manager Cesare Prandelli, winning the Campionato Allievi in 1992, and later the Trofeo Dossena, the Campionato Nazionale Primavera, and the Torneo di Viareggio in 1993, establishing himself as one of Italy's most promising under-21 players.

Morfeo subsequently began his professional career when he was promoted to the Atalanta BC senior side, making his Serie A debut with the club later that year, at the age of 17, on 19 December, in a 2–1 home win over Genoa. he scored his first two goals for the club after coming on as a substitute against Lecce, helping Atalanta to come back from behind to earn a 3–3 draw; he finished the 1993–94 season with 9 appearances and 3 goals.

After helping Atalanta to gain Serie A promotion during the 1994–95 Serie B season under manager Emiliano Mondonico, Morfeo soon came to prominence with the club during the 1995–96 season alongside Christian Vieri, scoring 11 goals in 30 league appearances, at the age of 19, and also reaching the Coppa Italia final, losing out to Fiorentina. The following season, he scored less frequently, managing only five goals, but provided several assists for his new attacking partner Filippo Inzaghi; together, they formed a formidable offensive partnership, and Inzaghi finished the season as the league's top-scorer.

=== Fiorentina and loan struggles ===
Morfeo's precocious performances led to a move to Fiorentina in 1997, for an undisclosed fee. During his time in Florence, despite the presence of the attacking trio of Manuel Rui Costa, Gabriel Batistuta and Luís Oliveira on the team, he initially managed to find space in the starting eleven under manager Alberto Malesani, although following the arrival of Edmundo, he later struggled to find playing time; in spite of the competition for a starting spot, he still managed 5 goals in 26 appearances for the club, and also provided several assists for his teammates throughout the season.

After failing to appear in Fiorentina's opening five league matches under new manager Giovanni Trapattoni the following season, Morfeo was sent on loan to Italian giants AC Milan in 1998, who had been impressed by the youngster's performances the previous season; however, his time at the Milanese club was largely unsuccessful, as several injuries and disagreements with manager Alberto Zaccheroni limited his playing time, and he only managed to obtain eleven appearances, mostly as a substitute, scoring one goal. Furthermore, Milan's rigorous use of the 4–4–2 system and subsequent switch to a 3–4–3 formation, neither of which featured an attacking midfielder, meant that Morfeo was often forced to play out of position as a winger, where he was not as effective or influential to the team's attacking play; as a result, he was often benched. Despite his mixed success throughout the season, he still managed to win his only professional trophy with the club that year, as Milan finished the 1998–99 season by claiming the Serie A title.

Due to his subsidiary role in Milan's title victory, his loan was not renewed the following season, and Fiorentina instead loaned him out to Cagliari. Morfeo's first half of the season was largely unsuccessful, as he managed only one goal in five appearances due to injury; in January 2000, he moved on loan to Verona, where he was reunited with his former Atalanta youth coach, Prandelli. In the second half of the 1999–2000 season, despite another injury, his performances improved drastically, and he scored five goals in ten appearances playing as a second striker, as well as providing several decisive assists, which ultimately helped Verona avoid relegation.

After being sidelined through injury for the first half of the 2000–01 season with Fiorentina, Morfeo briefly returned to Atalanta on loan the following January; during this time, however, he struggled with injuries and due to his character, and ultimately failed to consistently replicate the quality performances he had managed during his first spell with Atalanta, despite some promising performances, and a respectable tally of five goals in 17 appearances. After Fiorentina's financial difficulties had forced the club to sell several key players, Morfeo returned to the side for the 2001–02 season, and was now expected to be a central figure for the club; however, Fiorentina endured a difficult season, which ultimately ended with relegation to Serie B and bankruptcy, while Morfeo was limited to just two goals in 18 appearances, once again due to injury troubles.

=== Inter, Parma, and later career ===
The following season, Morfeo was signed by Inter Milan on a free transfer; however, he once again struggled at the club, due to several clashes with teammates, and manager Héctor Cúper, who frequently deployed Morfeo on the wing, and was eventually benched. Inter narrowly missed out on the 2002–03 Serie A title, and also reached the Champions League semi-finals, while Morfeo only scored one goal in 17 appearances. Morfeo later spent five seasons with Parma, from 2003 to 2008, where he was initially once again re-united with Prandelli, whose decision to field the playmaker in his favoured number 10 role was met with notable success and a great improvement in form. In later seasons, however, Morfeo once again clashed with his managers, and was often left out of the starting eleven; in total, Morfeo managed 16 goals in 101 Serie A appearances for the Emilian side.

At the age of 32, he then agreed to start the 2008–09 season with Serie B club Brescia Calcio, but in October 2008 he ultimately decided to retire from football citing lack of motivation, and did not appear for the club in league, making his only appearance for Brescia in the Coppa Italia.

In January 2009 he stepped back on his decision and returned to play football for the second half of the season with Cremonese, in the lower divisions, where he was re-united with coach Mondonico once again. Following a lengthy ban, he fully retired from football in February 2011, after a season with San Benedetto dei Marsi in the Seconda Categoria division. In total he scored 56 goals in 300 professional appearances throughout his career, scoring 54 goals in Serie A; 14 of these were scored from outside the area, with 8 of them coming from free-kicks, while only three were scored with his head, and ten with his right foot.

== International career ==
Morfeo was never capped by the Italy national football team at senior level, although in February 1996, he was called up by Arrigo Sacchi along with several other young, promising Italian players to an Italy training camp. Between 1991 and 1992, Morfeo represented the Italy Under-15 and Under-16 side, collecting 7 appearances and scoring two goals for the team. In 1993, he was called up to the Italy Under-18 side, with which he scored six goals in as many appearances. At Under-21 level, he was first called up under Cesare Maldini in 1995, and he was later one of the key players in Italy's victorious 1996 UEFA European Under-21 Championship campaign, scoring the decisive penalty in the final shoot-out victory against Spain following a 1–1 draw, after coming on as a substitute for goalscorer Francesco Totti in the second half; that same year, he represented the youth side at the 1996 Olympics. In total, he managed 7 appearances with the under-21 side between 1995 and 1997, scoring 1 goal for the Azzurrini.

== Style of play ==
Although Morfeo usually played as an attacking midfielder, he was often not deployed in his normal position at the beginning of his career, due to the prevalence of the 4–4–2 formation; he was therefore capable of playing in several midfield and attacking positions, and could also play as a left winger, as a second striker, or even as a deep-lying playmaker. A talented, diminutive, and creative player, with good feet, a slender physique, and an eye for goal, he was capable of both setting-up goals and scoring them himself with his excellent left foot, which initially earned him comparisons with his idol Roberto Baggio, as well as Gianni Rivera, and in particular Diego Maradona, leading him to be nicknamed Maradonino. Although he was not a particularly prolific player, he possessed an accurate and powerful shot from outside the area, and was also an accurate free-kick taker. Gifted with an intuitive capacity to interpret the game, Morfeo was known above all for his creativity, technical skills, vision, passing, and playmaking ability, as well as his adeptness at making attacking runs into the area, which made both him a dangerous attacking threat and an excellent assist provider. A quick and skilful dribbler, he was also known for his excellent technique, close control, and ability to dribble with his head up when in possession of the ball. In addition to his footballing skills, he was known for his confident and extroverted personality; however, he also had a difficult character, which led him to be involved in several conflicts with his managers. He was also notorious for his lack of notable pace or tactical discipline, and his arrogance and poor work-rate on the pitch, as well as his inconsistency and proneness to injury; as a result, he struggled to stand out in larger teams, in which he faced more competition for a starting spot, and which did not allow him to be deployed in his favoured role as a classic number 10. In his youth, he was considered by several pundits to be one of the most promising and precociously talented players ever to come out of Italy in recent years; however, despite his ability, he never realised his full potential.

== After retirement ==
Morfeo currently runs a restaurant in Parma, where he resides with his family.

== Personal life ==
Domenico's brother, Mario, was also a footballer.

== Honours ==
=== Club ===
Milan

- Serie A: 1998–99

=== International ===
Italy U21

- UEFA European Under-21 Championship: 1996
