= 1993 Torneo di Viareggio =

1993 Torneo Mondiale di Calcio Coppa Carnevale
45° Torneo di Viareggio

Tournament details
- Host country: Italy
- City: Viareggio
- Teams: 24

Final positions
- Champions: (Italy) Atalanta
- Runners-up: (Italy) Milan
- Third place: (Italy) Inter Milan
- Fourth place: (Italy) Padova

Tournament statistics
- Matches played: 50
- Goals scored: 104 (2.08 per match)

The 1993 winners of the Torneo di Viareggio (in English, the Viareggio Tournament, officially the Viareggio Cup World Football Tournament Coppa Carnevale), an annual youth football tournament held in Viareggio, Tuscany, are listed below.

== Format ==
The 24 teams are seeded in 6 groups. Each team from a group meets the others in a single tie. The winning club and runners-up from each group progress to the second round. In the second-round teams are split up in two groups and meet in a single tie (with penalties after regular time). Winners progress to the final knockout stage, along with the best losing team from each group. The final round matches include 30 minutes extra time and penalties to be played if the draw between teams still holds. The semifinals losing sides play consolation final. The winning teams play the final with extra time and repeat the match if the draw holds.

== Participating teams ==
Italian teams

- (Italy) Atalanta
- (Italy) Cosenza
- (Italy) Empoli
- (Italy) Fiorentina
- (Italy) Genoa
- (Italy) Inter Milan
- (Italy) Juventus
- (Italy) Milan
- (Italy) Modena
- (Italy) Napoli
- (Italy) Padova
- (Italy) Parma
- (Italy) Perugia
- (Italy) Reggiana
- (Italy) Torino
- (Italy) Taranto
- (Italy) Udinese
- (Italy) Venezia

European teams

- (Germany) Bayer 04 Leverkusen
- (England) Leeds United
- (France) Metz

American teams

- (Mexico) Pumas
- (Brazil) Palmeiras

Asian teams

- (Japan) Yomiuri

== Group stage ==
=== Group 1 ===
Team	Pts	Pld	W	D	L	GF	GA	GD
(Italy) Atalanta	7	3	2	1	0	4	2	+2
(Italy) Napoli	5	3	1	2	0	1	0	+1
(Italy) Empoli	4	3	1	1	1	1	2	-1
(Mexico) Pumas	1	3	0	1	2	2	4	-2

=== Group 2 ===
Team	Pts	Pld	W	D	L	GF	GA	GD
(Italy) Genoa	5	3	1	2	0	3	1	+2
(Italy) Juventus	4	3	1	1	1	2	1	+1
(Brazil) Palmeiras	4	3	1	1	1	1	8	-7
(Italy) Reggiana	3	3	1	0	2	9	4	+4

=== Group 3 ===
Team	Pts	Pld	W	D	L	GF	GA	GD
(Italy) Padova	5	3	1	2	0	3	2	+1
(Italy) Cosenza	5	3	1	2	0	2	1	+1
(Japan) Yomiuri	2	3	0	2	1	3	4	-1
(Italy) Torino	2	3	0	2	1	2	3	-1

=== Group 4 ===
Team	Pts	Pld	W	D	L	GF	GA	GD
(Italy) Modena	9	3	3	0	0	5	0	+5
(Italy) Milan	6	3	2	0	1	8	2	+6
(France) Metz	1	3	0	1	2	1	5	-4
(Italy) Taranto	1	3	0	1	2	0	7	-7

=== Group 5 ===
Team	Pts	Pld	W	D	L	GF	GA	GD
(Italy) Inter Milan	9	3	3	0	0	4	1	+3
(Italy) Udinese	6	3	2	0	1	3	1	+2
(Italy) Perugia	3	3	1	0	2	2	3	-1
(England) Leeds United	0	3	0	0	3	2	6	-4

=== Group 6 ===
Team	Pts	Pld	W	D	L	GF	GA	GD
(Italy) Fiorentina	9	3	3	0	0	10	1	+9
(Italy) Venezia	3	3	1	0	2	3	4	-1
(Germany) Bayer 04 Leverkusen	3	3	1	0	2	5	9	-9
(Italy) Parma	3	3	1	0	2	2	6	-4

== Second round ==
(Italy) Fiorentina	1 - 1 (4-2 pen)	(Italy) Udinese

(Italy) Padova	0 - 0 (4-3 pen)	(Italy) Milan

(Italy) Atalanta	0 - 0 (9-8 pen)	(Italy) Juventus

(Italy) Genoa	0 - 0 (5-4 pen)	(Italy) Napoli

(Italy) Modena	1 - 0	(Italy) Cosenza

(Italy) Inter Milan	3 - 0	(Italy) Venezia

== Knockout stage ==
Quarter-finals
(Italy) Atalanta	1
(Italy) Modena	0
(Italy) Inter Milan	1
(Italy) Genoa	0
(Italy) Milan	2
(Italy) Udinese	1
(Italy) Padova	4
(Italy) Fiorentina	2

Semi-finals
(Italy) Atalanta	2
(Italy) Inter Milan	0
(Italy) Milan (a.e.t.)	2
(Italy) Padova	1

Final
(Italy) Atalanta	3
(Italy) Milan	2
Third place
(Italy) Inter Milan	2
(Italy) Padova	0

== Champions ==
Torneo di Viareggio 1993 Champions

Atalanta
2nd time
