= Mario Chianese =

Italian painter (died 2020)

- Died: August 5, 2020
- Occupation: Painter

Mario Chianese (died August 5, 2020) was an Italian painter.
