= Filippo Inzaghi =

Italian football manager (born 1973)

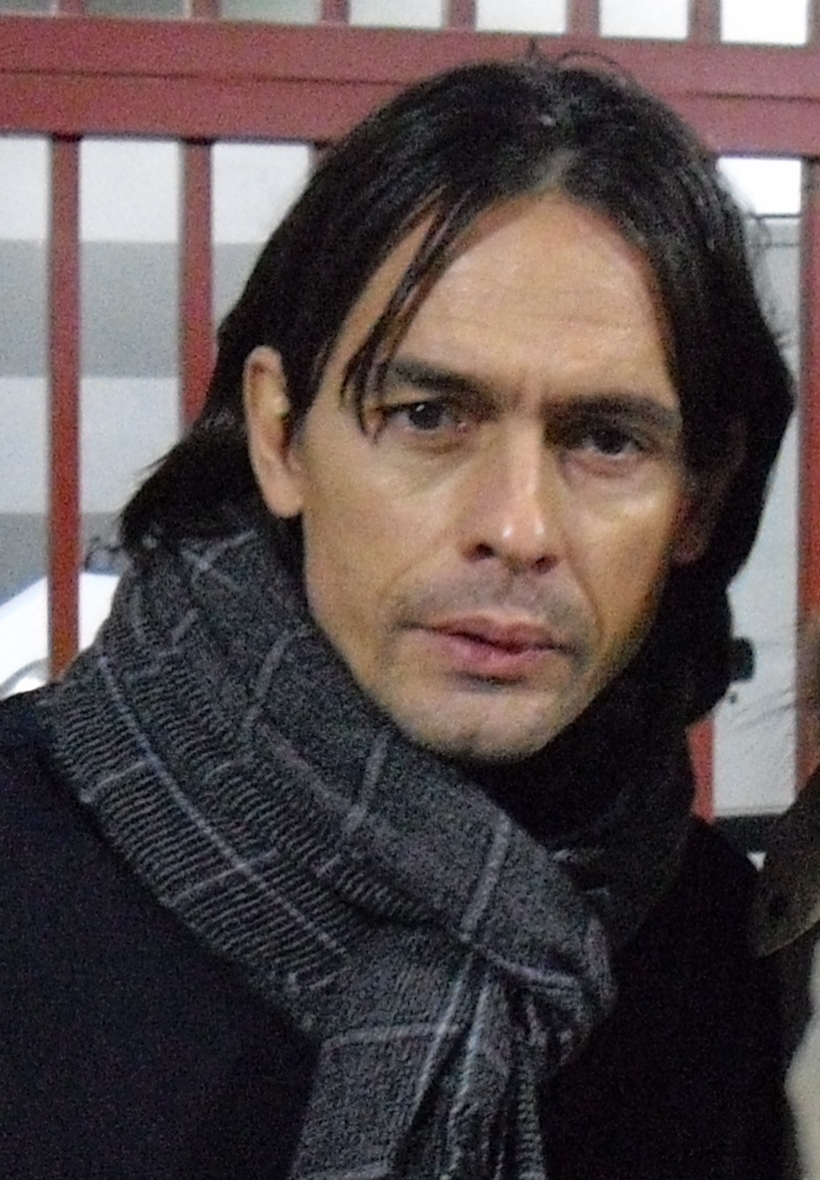
- Filippo Inzaghi in 2011

Personal information
- Full name: Filippo Inzaghi
- Date of birth: 9 August 1973 (age 53)
- Place of birth: Piacenza, Italy
- Height: 1.81 m (5 ft 11 in)
- Position: Striker

Team information
- Current team: Palermo (head coach)

Youth career
- 1982–1985: San Nicolò
- 1985–1991: Piacenza

Senior career*
Years	Team	Apps	(Gls)
1991–1995	Piacenza	39	(15)
1992–1993	→ AlbinoLeffe (loan)	21	(14)
1993–1994	→ Verona (loan)	36	(14)
1995–1996	Parma	15	(2)
1996–1997	Atalanta	33	(24)
1997–2001	Juventus	120	(57)
2001–2012	Milan	202	(73)
Total		466	(197)

International career
1993–1996	Italy U21	14	(3)
1997–2007	Italy	57	(25)

Managerial career
- 2014–2015: Milan
- 2016–2018: Venezia
- 2018–2019: Bologna
- 2019–2021: Benevento
- 2021–2022: Brescia
- 2022–2023: Reggina
- 2023–2024: Salernitana
- 2024–2025: Pisa
- 2025–: Palermo
Medal record
Men's football
Representing Italy
FIFA World Cup
Winner	2006 Germany
UEFA European Championship
Runner-up	2000 Belgium–Netherlands
UEFA European Under-21 Championship
Winner	1994 France
- * Club domestic league appearances and goals

Filippo "Pippo" Inzaghi Ufficiale OMRI (Italian pronunciation: [fiˈlippo ˈpippo inˈdzaːɡi]; born 9 August 1973) is an Italian professional football manager and former player who played as a striker. He is the head coach of Serie B club Palermo. Nicknamed "Superpippo" ("Super Goof") or "Alta tensione" ("High Tension") by fans and commentators during his playing career, Inzaghi is regarded as one of the greatest strikers of his generation. In the UEFA Champions League, he is the all-time Italian top goalscorer, scoring 46 goals.

Inzaghi played for several Italian clubs and spent the most notable spells of his club career with Juventus and AC Milan, winning two Champions League titles (2003, 2007), and three Serie A titles (1998, 2004, 2011). He is the seventh highest scorer in Italy, with 313 goals scored in official matches. He is currently the seventh-highest goalscorer in European club competitions with 70 goals, behind only Cristiano Ronaldo, Lionel Messi, Robert Lewandowski, Raúl, Karim Benzema, and Harry Kane. He is also Milan's top international goalscorer in the club's history with 43 goals. He also holds the record for most hat-tricks in Serie A with 10.

At international level, Inzaghi earned 57 caps for the Italy national team between 1997 and 2007, scoring 25 goals. He represented his country at three FIFA World Cups, winning the 2006 edition, and he also took part in UEFA Euro 2000, where he won a runners-up medal.

His younger brother, Simone Inzaghi, is also a football manager and former Italian international player.

== Club career ==
=== Early career ===
Inzaghi's favourite footballers as a child were Paolo Rossi and Marco van Basten. The elder brother of fellow footballer Simone Inzaghi, he got his start playing for hometown club Piacenza as a teenager in 1991, but made only two league appearances before being loaned to Serie C1 side Leffe, with whom he scored an impressive 13 goals in 21 matches. In 1993, Inzaghi moved to Serie B club Hellas Verona and scored 13 goals in 36 league appearances. Upon his return to Piacenza, he scored 15 times in 37 games helping his team win Serie B and proving himself to be an exciting young prospect.

Inzaghi made his Serie A debut when he transferred to Parma in 1995, but scored only twice in 15 league matches. One of these two goals came against one of his former clubs, Piacenza, literally "making him cry". He added another two goals in European competitions that season. In the following season, he moved on to Atalanta, finishing as the Capocannoniere (Serie A's top scorer) with 24 goals after scoring against every team in the league. He was crowned Serie A Young Footballer of the Year and served as team captain in the last game of the season.

=== Juventus ===
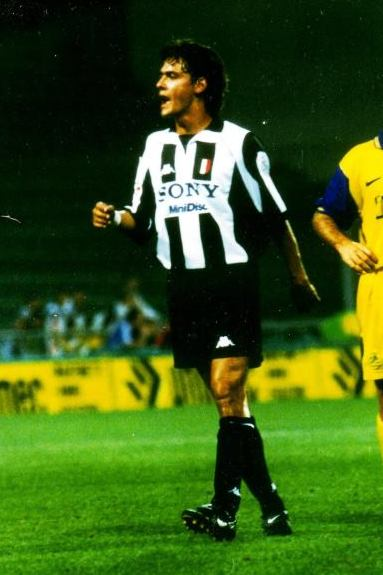
Inzaghi playing for Juventus in a 1997–98 Coppa Italia match

Inzaghi, however, was soon on the move once again to his sixth team in seven seasons, this time to Juventus for a reported 23 billion lire. He formed a formidable attacking partnership along with Alessandro Del Piero and Zinedine Zidane, a tandem which would last for four seasons, under managers Marcello Lippi, and subsequently Carlo Ancelotti, marking Inzaghi's longest stint with one team at the time. During his time with the Bianconeri, he scored two Champions League hat-tricks – against Dynamo Kyiv and Hamburger SV – becoming the first player to do so.

During his first season with the club, Inzaghi scored two goals as Juventus beat Vicenza 3–0 in the 1997 Supercoppa Italiana. Juventus won the Scudetto during the 1997–98 season, in which Inzaghi scored 18 goals, including a decisive, Scudetto-winning hat-trick against Bologna. He also scored six goals to help Juventus reach the Champions League final, although they were defeated 1–0 by Real Madrid.

The 1998–99 season was less successful for Juventus, as they were defeated in the 1998 Supercoppa Italiana by Lazio and finished the season seventh place in Serie A. Inzaghi still managed 20 goals in all competitions, finishing the season as the club's top-scorer; Six of his goals came in the Champions League, as Juventus were eliminated in the semi-finals by eventual champions Manchester United. During the second leg of the semi-finals in Turin, Inzaghi scored two goals in the first ten minutes, but Manchester United eventually managed to come back and win the match 3–2.

Inzaghi helped Juventus win the 1999 UEFA Intertoto Cup, scoring five goals in the semi-finals against Rostov, and two in the finals against Rennes, qualifying Juventus for the UEFA Cup that season. Inzaghi scored 15 goals in Serie A as Juventus narrowly missed out on the title to Lazio, defeated on the final matchday. The following season, Inzaghi managed 11 goals in Serie A as Juventus finished second in the league for the second consecutive season; he also scored five goals in the UEFA Champions League, including a hat-trick in a 4–4 draw against Hamburger SV, although Juventus were eliminated in the first round. With 16 goals in all competitions, he was Juventus's top goalscorer for the third consecutive season. However, his once-effective partnership with Del Piero had become less effective in recent seasons, due to their lack of understanding, individualism, and their strained relationship both on and off the pitch.

=== AC Milan ===
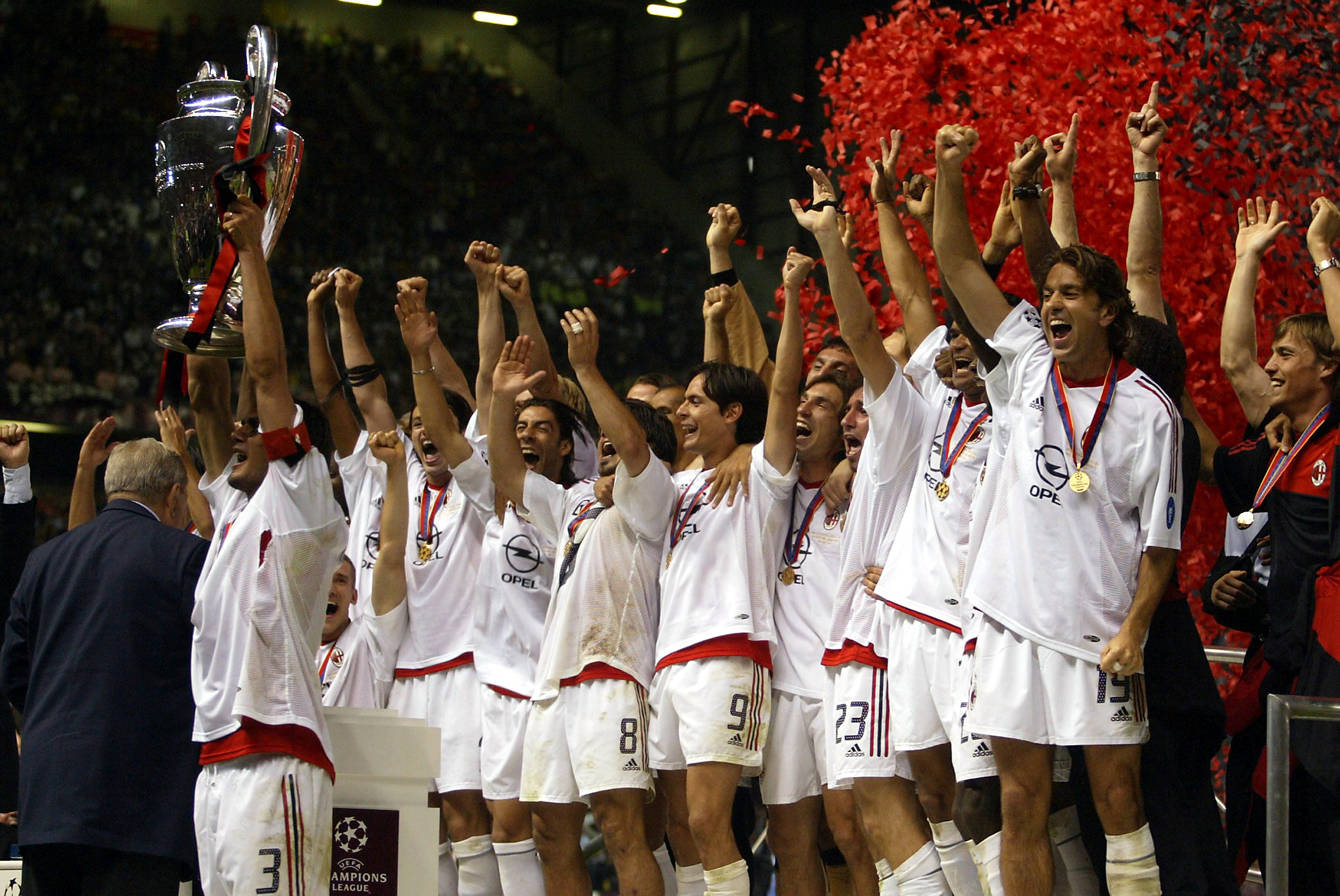
Inzaghi (center, no. 9) celebrating with his Milan teammates the triumph in the 2003 UEFA Champions League final

Despite scoring a high 89 goals in 165 games for the Bianconeri, Inzaghi was soon benched in favour of David Trezeguet and on 2 July 2001 signed for AC Milan for a reported 70 billion lire, or 45 billion lire cash plus Cristian Zenoni (Sky Sports reported a smaller total figure, £17 million) for the 2001–02 campaign by coach Fatih Terim. Juventus announced that the sale of Inzaghi produced a capital gain of €31.1 million to the club, making the actual transfer fee far exceed that figure. Inzaghi, however, suffered a knee injury and missed the first half of the season. Upon his return, he was able to forge a strong goalscoring partnership with Andriy Shevchenko, and he soon earned many trophies with the Rossoneri under new manager Carlo Ancelotti, among them the 2002–03 Champions League (in which Milan defeated his previous team, Juventus, in the final on penalties), along with the 2002–03 Coppa Italia (scoring in a 2–2 draw in the second leg), the 2003 UEFA Super Cup, the 2004 Supercoppa Italiana, and the 2003–04 Scudetto. In the 2002–03 Champions League campaign, he scored his record third Champions League hat-trick against Deportivo de La Coruña in the Group Stage and a decisive goal in quarter-finals against Ajax, totalling 12 European goals in that season. In November 2004, he signed a contract extension with the club.

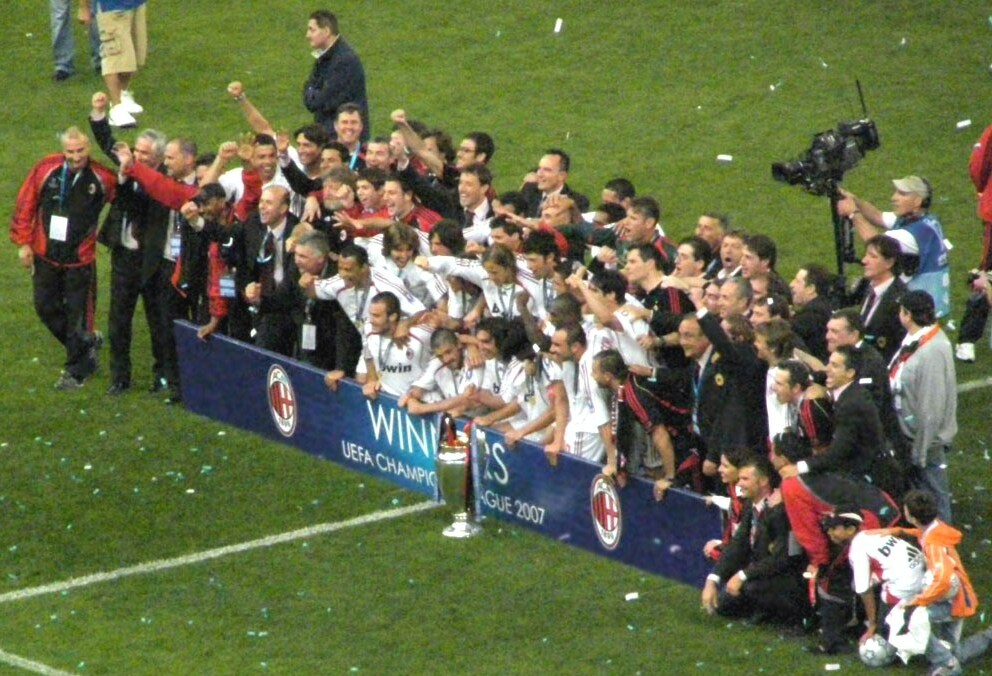
Inzaghi celebrating the 2007 UEFA Champions League triumph with his Milan teammates

Inzaghi fully recovered from the persistent knee injuries that had dogged him for two years and regained his predatory goalscoring form by scoring 12 goals in 22 Serie A matches in 2005–06, along with four goals in five Champions' League appearances; two against Lyon in the quarter-finals and another two against Bayern Munich in the first knockout stage. He scored the decisive goal against the Bavarians in the 2007 quarter-finals, helping Milan to reach the semi-finals of the competition. On 23 May 2007, in the 2007 Champions League final in Athens, he scored both of Milan's goals in their 2–1 victory over Liverpool in a rematch of the 2005 final. He declared after the match:

It's a dream since I was a child to score twice in the final, and the ones I scored yesterday evening were the most important in my life. It was an unforgettable game. It's something that will stay with me all my life and two goals in the final speaks for itself.

— Filippo Inzaghi

At the start of the 2007–08 season, he picked up where he left off in Athens, scoring the equalizer in the Super Cup in Milan's 3–1 victory over Sevilla. Inzaghi capped off the year by scoring two goals in the 2007 FIFA Club World Cup final, helping Milan win 4–2 against Boca Juniors to take revenge for the defeat on penalties in 2003.

On 24 February 2008, Inzaghi scored the match-winning goal in Milan's 2–1 win over Palermo with a diving header after coming into the game from the bench; it marked his first Serie A goal in over a year. This was followed by ten more goals in the league, the last against Udinese. This strike against Udinese was his 100th goal for the club in official games. But despite incredible form, Italy national team manager Roberto Donadoni declined to call him for Euro 2008. In November 2008, Inzaghi agreed to a contract extension with Milan until June 2010.

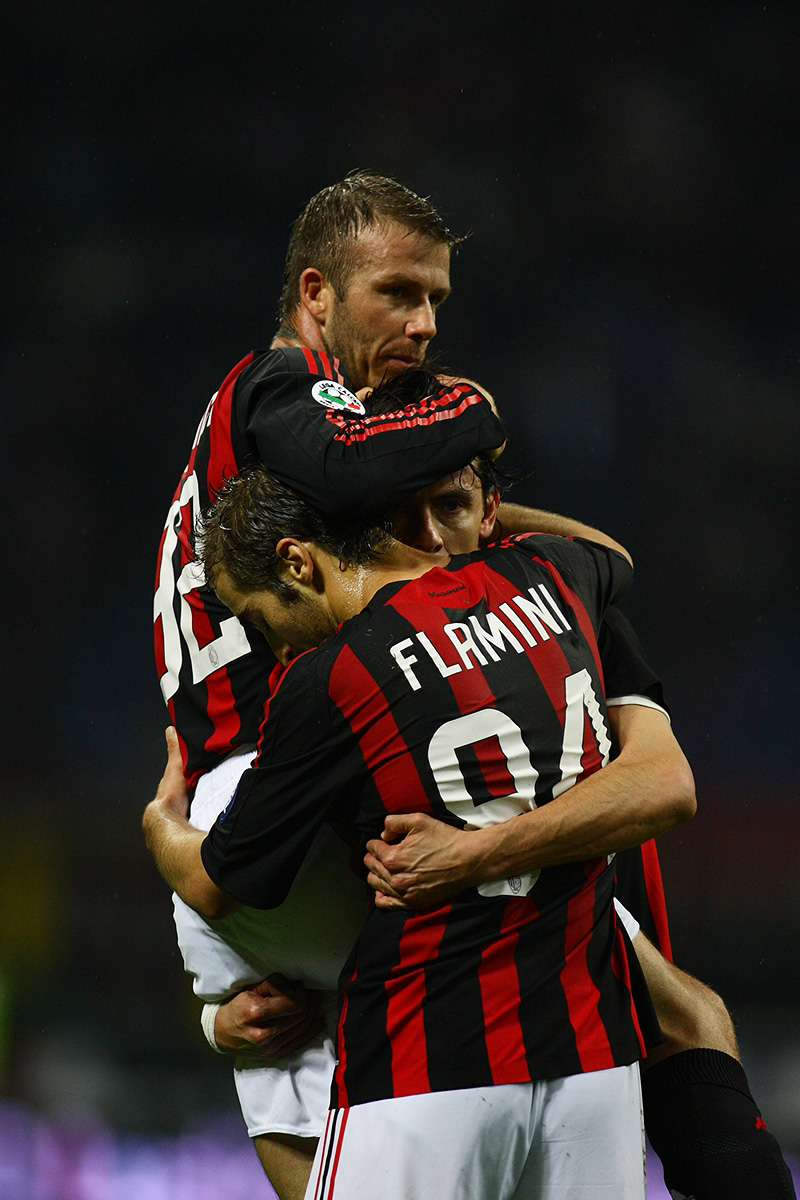
Inzaghi celebrating a goal against Torino with David Beckham and Mathieu Flamini in 2009

On 8 March 2009, Inzaghi scored his first hat-trick of the season for Milan against Atalanta, leading his team to a 3–0 victory at the San Siro. His 300th career goal came in the 5–1 thrashing of Siena away from home. He then went on to score three goals against Torino, his second professional hat-trick in that season. Scoring this hat-trick enabled him to set a record for the player with the most hat-tricks in Serie A over the last 25 years. With ten hat-tricks in Serie A, Inzaghi is ahead of Giuseppe Signori (9), Hernán Crespo (8), Roberto Baggio, Marco van Basten, Gabriel Batistuta, Abel Balbo, Vincenzo Montella (7), Antonio Di Natale and David Trezeguet (6). Inzaghi scored one hat-trick for Atalanta, four for Juventus, and five for Milan.

In the 2009–10 season, under manager Leonardo, Inzaghi was relegated to the role of backup player with his contract set to expire in June 2010. On 21 May 2010, he was offered a new one-year contract which would last until 30 June 2011.

On 3 November 2010, in the UEFA Champions League 2010–11 Group Stage campaign, with Milan trailing by 1–0 to Real Madrid, Inzaghi came off the bench in the second half and scored a brace to give Milan a 2–1 lead. Pedro León, however, equalized in the 94th minute, with the final score ending 2–2. On that occasion, he became the new all-time top scorer of all European club competitions with 70 goals. He also became the second-oldest player to score in the Champions League, aged 37 years and 85 days, behind only Manchester United's Ryan Giggs, now surpassed by Inzaghi's compatriot Francesco Totti. With these two goals, Inzaghi went ahead of his idol Marco van Basten on the club list of the all-time top goalscorers with 125 goals.

On 10 November 2010, Inzaghi suffered a serious injury while playing for Milan against Palermo. A statement on the official Milan club website confirmed that Inzaghi had suffered a lesion of the anterior cruciate ligament (ACL) and an associated lesion to the external meniscus of the left knee. It was thought he would be out for the rest of the season. Due to his age, this injury could have ended his career; nonetheless, Inzaghi was optimistic. On 7 May 2011, with Inzaghi still out recovering from his injury, Milan won the 2010–11 Serie A title. After being sidelined by injury for six months, he came off the bench for the first time since his injury on 14 May, with Milan defeating Cagliari 4–1. He extended his contract till June 2012 during the 2011–12 pre-season.

Just like with Andrea Pirlo in 2011, Milan decided not to renew the contracts of several veteran players at the end of the season and Inzaghi was one of those, along with Gennaro Gattuso, Clarence Seedorf, Alessandro Nesta and Gianluca Zambrotta. He played his final game for Milan against Novara on 13 May 2012 and marked his performance by scoring the winning goal. On 24 July 2012, Inzaghi announced his retirement from professional football to start a coaching career.

=== European competition records ===
With 70 goals, Inzaghi is the sixth-highest scorer in European club competitions, behind only Cristiano Ronaldo, Lionel Messi, Robert Lewandowski, Raúl and Karim Benzema. He became the first player to score two Champions League hat-tricks – both with Juventus – when he netted a treble during a 4–4 group stage draw with Hamburger SV on 13 September 2000; his first was in a 4–1 victory over Dynamo Kyiv during the 1997–98 quarter-finals. Inzaghi scored a record third Champions League hat-trick in a 4–0 win against Deportivo de La Coruña in the 2002–03 season, while playing for Milan. This record would later be tied by Michael Owen, who scored two hat-tricks for Liverpool and a third for Manchester United.

== International career ==
Between 1993 and 1996, Inzaghi made 14 appearances for the Italy under-21 team, scoring three goals; he was also a member of the Italy under-21 squad that won the 1994 UEFA European Under-21 Championship. Inzaghi earned his first senior cap for Italy in the Tournoi de France, against Brazil on 8 June 1997, under his former under-21 manager Cesare Maldini, and provided an assist to goalscorer Alessandro Del Piero. Italy went on to draw 3–3. He scored his first goal for Italy on 18 November 1998, in a 2–2 friendly draw against Spain; he has since scored 25 goals in 57 appearances. He was called up for the 1998 FIFA World Cup, Euro 2000, the 2002 World Cup and the 2006 World Cup.

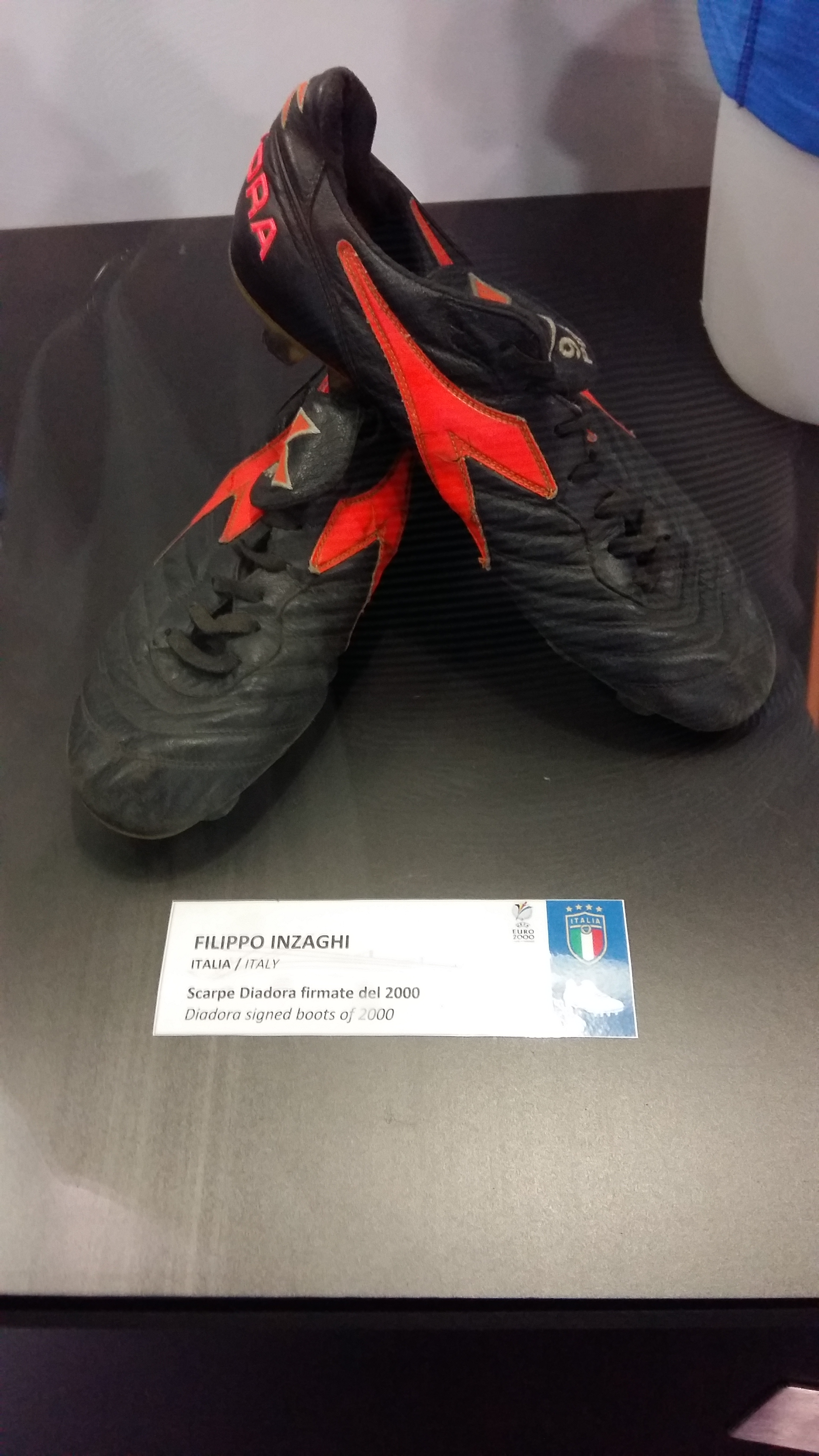
Inzaghi's boots from UEFA Euro 2000, on display at the San Siro Museum

Although Inzaghi went scoreless throughout the 1998 World Cup, as he was mainly deployed as a substitute, he came off the bench to set up a goal for Roberto Baggio in Italy's final group match against Austria, which ended in a 2–1 win, and allowed Italy to top their group; Italy were knocked out in the quarter-finals on penalties to hosts and eventual champions France. At Euro 2000, he was one of Italy's starting strikers under the new Italy manager Dino Zoff. He scored two goals throughout the tournament; his first came from a penalty, in Italy's 2–1 opening group win over Turkey, in which he was named man of the match, while his second came in a 2–0 win over Romania in the quarter-finals of the competition; he also set up Stefano Fiore's goal in a 2–0 win over co-hosts Belgium in his nation's second group match of the tournament. His performances helped Italy reach the final, where they were defeated by France once again, on a golden goal. Along with Francesco Totti, he was Italy's top-scorer throughout the tournament.

Under Zoff's replacement, Giovanni Trapattoni, Inzaghi was Italy's top goalscorer during the qualifying rounds of the 2002 World Cup and Euro 2004, scoring his first and only international hat-trick in a 4–0 home win over Wales on 6 September 2003, although he missed the latter tournament due to injury. He went scoreless throughout the 2002 World Cup, making two appearances, as Italy were controversially eliminated in the round of 16 to co-hosts South Korea; in Italy's 2–1 loss to Croatia in their second group match, Materazzi played a floating ball over the top from just over halfway to Inzaghi in the 90th minute, but everyone missed the ball and it rolled into the back of the net, although the goal was disallowed after referee Graham Poll claimed that Inzaghi had grabbed an opponent's shirt. Inzaghi also had a goal wrongly disallowed in Italy's final group match against Mexico, which ended in a 1–1 draw.

Inzaghi's persistent knee and ankle injuries put a halt to his international play for almost two years before his resurgence at club level, which resulted in being called up by Italy coach Marcello Lippi for the 2006 World Cup final tournament. Due to the abundance of other top strikers such as Alessandro Del Piero, Francesco Totti and Luca Toni, Inzaghi made his only appearance – subbing on for Alberto Gilardino – in Italy's final group stage match against the Czech Republic on 22 June 2006, scoring his only goal in the tournament, rounding Petr Čech in a one-on-one encounter to net Italy's second goal, which made him the oldest player to have scored for Italy in a World Cup, after Daniele Massaro. Italy went on to win the tournament, defeating France on penalties in the final.

Following Italy's fourth World Cup victory, Inzaghi made six appearances under new manager Roberto Donadoni in Italy's UEFA Euro 2008 qualification campaign, scoring three goals, two of which came in a 2–1 away win against the Faroe Islands on 2 June 2007. He was not called up for the final tournament, however, where Italy were eliminated by eventual champions Spain in the quarter-finals on penalties, and he made his last appearance for Italy on 8 September 2007, in a 0–0 draw against France in Milan.

Inzaghi is currently the sixth-highest goalscorer in the Italian national team's history, with 25 goals, alongside Adolfo Baloncieri and Alessandro Altobelli.

== Style of play ==
"It's not Inzaghi who is in love with goals; it's the goals that are in love with him."

— Emiliano Mondonico.

Inzaghi was an intelligent, extremely fast, agile, and opportunistic player, with excellent reactions and a lanky, slender physique; although not very technically gifted, he was known for his great skill in taking advantage of the carelessness of his opponents, his excellent positional sense in the area, and his eye for goal, making a name for himself as a "goal poacher", due to his style of play and tendency to operate mainly in the penalty box, as well as his timing and ability to find spaces and anticipate opponents to get on the end of passes. These qualities, along with his finishing ability with both his head and feet, made him one of the most prolific strikers of the past decades. Inzaghi was described as a player who lived on the offside line.

When he was first called up to the national team, the other Italian players were surprised at his lack of technical accomplishment, but came to accept him because he scored so frequently. Johan Cruyff described this contrast—"Look, actually he can't play football at all. He's just always in the right position." Fans nicknamed him Superpippo, the Italian name for Super Goof, the superhero alter ego of cartoon character Goofy (Pippo being a common hypocorism of his first name Filippo). Tactically, Inzaghi was noted for his vision and ability to read the game, as well as his outstanding offensive movement off the ball, ability to play off the shoulders of the last defender, and to time his attacking runs to beat the offside trap, which allowed him to get on the end of passes, but also to provide depth to his team, leading long-time Manchester United manager Sir Alex Ferguson to quip: "That lad must have been born offside."

Although in the past, due to his poor defensive work-rate and lack of notable technical skills, strength in the air or long range striking ability, he was initially accused, by some in the sport, of being a limited striker or a "lucky" player, and also drew criticism at times for being selfish, for not participating in the build-up of plays, and for going to ground too easily, he has been praised by several of his former managers and teammates for his prolific goalscoring. Despite his lack of significant talent, Inzaghi and others attribute his success, aside from technical prowess, to personal drive, intelligence, and determination. Due to his opportunistic playing style, Inzaghi was frequently compared to Paolo Rossi throughout his career. Despite his prolific goalscoring, Inzaghi was often considered injury-prone throughout his career.

== Managerial career ==
=== AC Milan ===
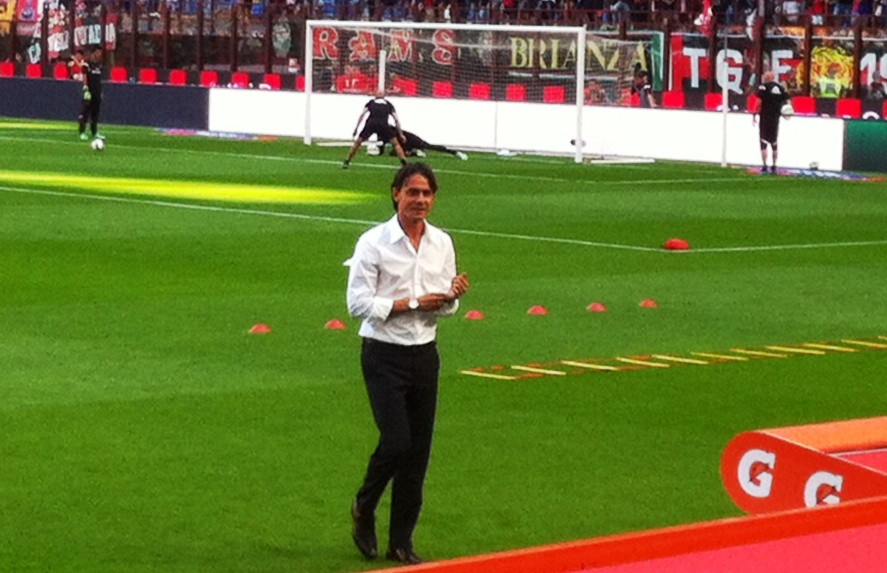
Inzaghi managing Milan in 2014

Inzaghi started his coaching career at the beginning of the 2012–13 season, signing a two-year deal as the manager of AC Milan's Allievi (under-17) team.

On 9 June 2014, Inzaghi was named manager of Milan's first team after the dismissal of his former Rossoneri teammate Clarence Seedorf. In Inzaghi's first match as a manager in Serie A on 31 August, Milan defeated Lazio 3–1 at the San Siro. Inzaghi then led Milan to a second consecutive win in a match that ended with a 5–4 Milan win against Parma.

On 4 June 2015 Adriano Galliani, the CEO of Milan, announced that Inzaghi would not be the coach for next season. He was officially dismissed on 16 June 2015.

=== Venezia ===
On 7 June 2016, Inzaghi was appointed as the new coach of ambitious Lega Pro club Venezia. On 19 April 2017, after beating Parma to top spot, he won promotion to Serie B as champions. He also won the Coppa Italia Lega Pro in the same season.

During the 2017–18 season, Inzaghi guided the Venetians to a fifth-place finish in Serie B, finishing in the playoff positions to earn promotion to Serie A. After eliminating Perugia (coached by his former teammate Alessandro Nesta) in the preliminary round, his team was defeated by Palermo in the semi-finals.

=== Bologna ===
On 13 June 2018, Inzaghi was announced as the new head coach of top-flight Bologna, taking over from Roberto Donadoni. He faced a Lazio side coached by his younger brother Simone in an eventual 0–2 defeat on 26 December. Following a record of two wins in 21 games, he was dismissed on 28 January 2019 and replaced by Siniša Mihajlović.

=== Benevento ===
On 22 June 2019, Inzaghi was appointed manager of Benevento in Serie B. On 30 June the following year, his club achieved promotion as champions with seven games remaining, reaching Serie A for the second time in their history. On his Serie A debut for the team, they won 3–2 at Sampdoria on 26 September, having been losing 2–0. Benevento ended the 2020–21 Serie A season in eighteenth place, being relegated back to Serie B after only one season; as a consequence of the events, Inzaghi was not offered a new contract and left Benevento afterwards.

=== Brescia ===
On 9 June 2021, Inzaghi was appointed manager of Brescia in Serie B. On 16 August, Inzaghi made his debut for Brescia in the first round Coppa Italia match losing 4–2 in the penalty shoot-out after a 2–2 draw in the extra-time.

On 23 March 2022, Inzaghi was dismissed by club chairman Massimo Cellino, leaving the club in fifth place in the league table. After his successor Eugenio Corini was eliminated in the promotion playoff semifinals by Monza, on 25 May 2022 Cellino formally reappointed Inzaghi as head coach, due to a clause that was legally forbidding his sacking if Brescia were placed in one of the top eight league places.

=== Reggina ===
On 12 July 2022, Inzaghi was appointed manager of Reggina in Serie B, signing a three-year deal with the Calabrians. After guiding Reggina to a spot in the promotion playoffs, he was released together with all players and staff as Reggina were excluded due to financial issues, thus finding himself without a job at the beginning of the 2023–24 season.

=== Salernitana ===
On 10 October 2023, relegation-struggling Serie A club Salernitana announced the appointment of Inzaghi in place of outgoing Paulo Sousa. He was sacked on 11 February 2024 and replaced by Fabio Liverani.

=== Pisa ===
On 3 July 2024, Inzaghi signed for Serie B club Pisa. In his debut season with the club, Inzaghi led Pisa to promotion to Serie A, marking their return to the top flight after a 34-year absence. He left Pisa on 13 June 2025.

=== Palermo ===
On 17 June 2025, Inzaghi was confirmed as the new head coach for Palermo.

== Media ==
Inzaghi features in EA Sports' FIFA video game series; he was on the cover for the Italian edition of FIFA 2001, and was named in the Ultimate Team Legends in FIFA 14.

In 2015, the arcade game company Konami announced that Inzaghi would feature in their football video game Pro Evolution Soccer 2016 as one of the new myClub Legends.

== Career statistics ==
=== Club ===
Appearances and goals by club, season and competition
Club	Season	League			Coppa Italia		Europe		Other		Total	
Club	Season	Division	Apps	Goals	Apps	Goals	Apps	Goals	Apps	Goals	Apps	Goals
Piacenza	1991–92	Serie B	2	0	1	0	—		—		3	0
Piacenza	1994–95	Serie B	37	15	4	2	—		—		41	17
Piacenza	Total		39	15	5	2	—		—		44	17
Leffe (loan)	1992–93	Serie C1	21	13	0	0	—		—		21	13
Verona (loan)	1993–94	Serie B	36	13	1	1	—		—		37	14
Parma	1995–96	Serie A	15	2	1	0	6 (Note: Appearances in UEFA Cup Winners' Cup)	2	—		22	4
Atalanta	1996–97	Serie A	33	24	1	1	—		—		34	25
Juventus	1997–98	Serie A	31	18	4	1	10 (Note: Appearances in UEFA Champions League)	6	1 (Note: Appearance in Supercoppa Italiana)	2	46	27
Juventus	1998–99	Serie A	28	13	1	0	10	6	3 (Note: Two appearances and one goal in UEFA Cup qualification, one appearance in Supercoppa Italiana)	1	42	20
Juventus	1999–2000	Serie A	33	15	2	1	8 (Note: Four appearances and seven goals in UEFA Intertoto Cup, four appearances and three goals in UEFA Cup)	10	—		43	26
Juventus	2000–01	Serie A	28	11	0	0	6	5	—		34	16
Juventus	Total		120	57	7	2	34	27	4	3	165	89
AC Milan	2001–02	Serie A	20	10	1	2	7 (Note: Appearances in UEFA Cup)	4	—		28	16
AC Milan	2002–03	Serie A	30	17	3	1	16	12	—		49	30
AC Milan	2003–04	Serie A	14	3	3	2	8	2	3 (Note: One appearance in Supercoppa Italiana, one appearance in UEFA Super Cup, one appearance in Intercontinental Cup)	0	28	7
AC Milan	2004–05	Serie A	11	0	2	0	2	1	—		15	1
AC Milan	2005–06	Serie A	23	12	2	1	6	4	—		31	17
AC Milan	2006–07	Serie A	20	2	5	3	12	6	—		37	11
AC Milan	2007–08	Serie A	21	11	0	0	5	4	3 (Note: Two appearances and two goals in FIFA Club World Cup, one appearance and one goal in UEFA Super Cup)	3	29	18
AC Milan	2008–09	Serie A	26	13	0	0	6	3	—		32	16
AC Milan	2009–10	Serie A	24	2	2	1	7	2	—		33	5
AC Milan	2010–11	Serie A	6	2	0	0	3	2	—		9	4
AC Milan	2011–12	Serie A	7	1	2	0	0	0	—		9	1
AC Milan	Total		202	73	20	10	72	40	6	3	300	126
Career total			466	197	35	16	112	69	10	6	623	288

=== International ===
Appearances and goals by national team and year
National team	Year	Apps	Goals
Italy	1997	3	0
Italy	1998	6	3
Italy	1999	8	3
Italy	2000	11	5
Italy	2001	8	4
Italy	2002	8	0
Italy	2003	4	6
Italy	2004	0	0
Italy	2005	0	0
Italy	2006	5	2
Italy	2007	4	2
Total		57	25

Scores and results list Italy's goal tally first, score column indicates score after each Inzaghi goal.

List of international goals scored by Filippo Inzaghi
No.	Date	Venue	Opponent	Score	Result	Competition
1	18 October 1998	Salerno, Italy	Spain	1–0	2–2	Friendly
2	18 October 1998	Salerno, Italy	Spain	2–1	2–2	Friendly
3	16 December 1998	Rome, Italy	(United Nations) World Stars	1–0	6–2	Friendly
4	27 March 1999	Copenhagen, Denmark	Denmark	1–0	2–1	UEFA Euro 2000 qualifying
5	31 March 1999	Ancona, Italy	Belarus	1–1	1–1	UEFA Euro 2000 qualifying
6	5 June 1999	Bologna, Italy	Wales	2–0	4–0	UEFA Euro 2000 qualifying
7	11 June 2000	Arnhem, Netherlands	Turkey	2–1	2–1	UEFA Euro 2000
8	24 June 2000	Brussels, Belgium	Romania	2–0	2–0	UEFA Euro 2000
9	3 September 2000	Budapest, Hungary	Hungary	1–0	2–2	2002 FIFA World Cup qualification
10	3 September 2000	Budapest, Hungary	Hungary	2–1	2–2	2002 FIFA World Cup qualification
11	7 October 2000	Milan, Italy	Romania	1–0	3–0	2002 FIFA World Cup qualification
12	24 March 2001	Bucharest, Romania	Romania	1–0	2–0	2002 FIFA World Cup qualification
13	24 March 2001	Bucharest, Romania	Romania	2–0	2–0	2002 FIFA World Cup qualification
14	28 March 2001	Trieste, Italy	Lithuania	1–0	4–0	2002 FIFA World Cup qualification
15	28 March 2001	Trieste, Italy	Lithuania	3–0	4–0	2002 FIFA World Cup qualification
16	6 September 2003	Milan, Italy	Wales	1–0	4–0	UEFA Euro 2004 qualifying
17	6 September 2003	Milan, Italy	Wales	2–0	4–0	UEFA Euro 2004 qualifying
18	6 September 2003	Milan, Italy	Wales	3–0	4–0	UEFA Euro 2004 qualifying
19	10 September 2003	Belgrade, Serbia	Serbia and Montenegro	1–0	1–1	UEFA Euro 2004 qualifying
20	11 October 2003	Reggio Calabria, Italy	Azerbaijan	2–0	4–0	UEFA Euro 2004 qualifying
21	11 October 2003	Reggio Calabria, Italy	Azerbaijan	4–0	4–0	UEFA Euro 2004 qualifying
22	22 June 2006	Hamburg, Germany	Czech Republic	2–0	2–0	2006 FIFA World Cup
23	2 September 2006	Naples, Italy	Lithuania	1–1	1–1	UEFA Euro 2008 qualifying
24	2 June 2007	Tórshavn, Faroe Islands	Faroe Islands	1–0	2–1	UEFA Euro 2008 qualifying
25	2 June 2007	Tórshavn, Faroe Islands	Faroe Islands	2–0	2–1	UEFA Euro 2008 qualifying

=== Managerial ===
As of match played 21 November 2026

Managerial record by team and tenure
Team	From	To	Record							
Team	From	To	G	W	D	L	GF	GA	GD	Win %
AC Milan	9 June 2014	16 June 2015	40	14	13	13	58	52	+6	35.00
Venezia	7 June 2016	11 June 2018	95	47	31	17	138	88	+50	49.47
Bologna	13 June 2018	28 January 2019	24	4	8	12	21	36	−15	16.67
Benevento	22 June 2019	24 May 2021	78	33	20	25	112	110	+2	42.31
Brescia	9 June 2021	23 March 2022	32	14	13	5	50	34	+16	43.75
Reggina	12 July 2022	31 August 2023	40	17	4	19	49	47	+2	42.50
Salernitana	10 October 2023	11 February 2024	18	3	4	11	21	36	−15	16.67
Pisa	31 July 2024	13 June 2025	40	24	7	9	67	37	+30	60.00
Palermo	17 June 2025	present	56	31	16	9	97	54	+43	55.36
Total			423	187	116	120	613	496	+117	44.21

== Honours ==
=== Player ===
Piacenza

- Serie B: 1994–95

Juventus

- Serie A: 1997–98
- Supercoppa Italiana: 1997
- UEFA Intertoto Cup: 1999

AC Milan

- Serie A: 2003–04, 2010–11
- Coppa Italia: 2002–03
- UEFA Champions League: 2002–03, 2006–07
- UEFA Super Cup: 2003, 2007
- FIFA Club World Cup: 2007

Italy U21

- UEFA European Under-21 Championship: 1994

Italy

- FIFA World Cup: 2006

Individual

- Serie A Young Footballer of the Year: 1997
- Capocannoniere: 1996–97
- 2007 UEFA Champions League final: Man of the Match
- Italy's top goal scorer under UEFA club competition records
- AC Milan's top goal scorer in Europe
- Premio Nazionale Carriera Esemplare "Gaetano Scirea": 2007
- AC Milan top goalscorer (2002–03 Season)
- AC Milan AC Milan Hall of Fame
- Niccolo Galli Memorial Award
- Grand Prix Sport And Communication Award
- Gran Galà del Calcio AIC Lifetime Achievement Award: 2012
- Player Career Award in the Globe Soccer Awards: 2014

=== Manager ===
Venezia

- Lega Pro: 2016–17
- Coppa Italia Lega Pro: 2016–17

Benevento

- Serie B: 2019–20

Pisa

- Serie B runner-up: 2024–25

Individual

- Panchina d'Argento: 2020

=== Orders ===

5th Class / Knight: Cavaliere Ordine al Merito della Repubblica Italiana: 2000

4th Class / Officer: Ufficiale Ordine al Merito della Repubblica Italiana: 2006

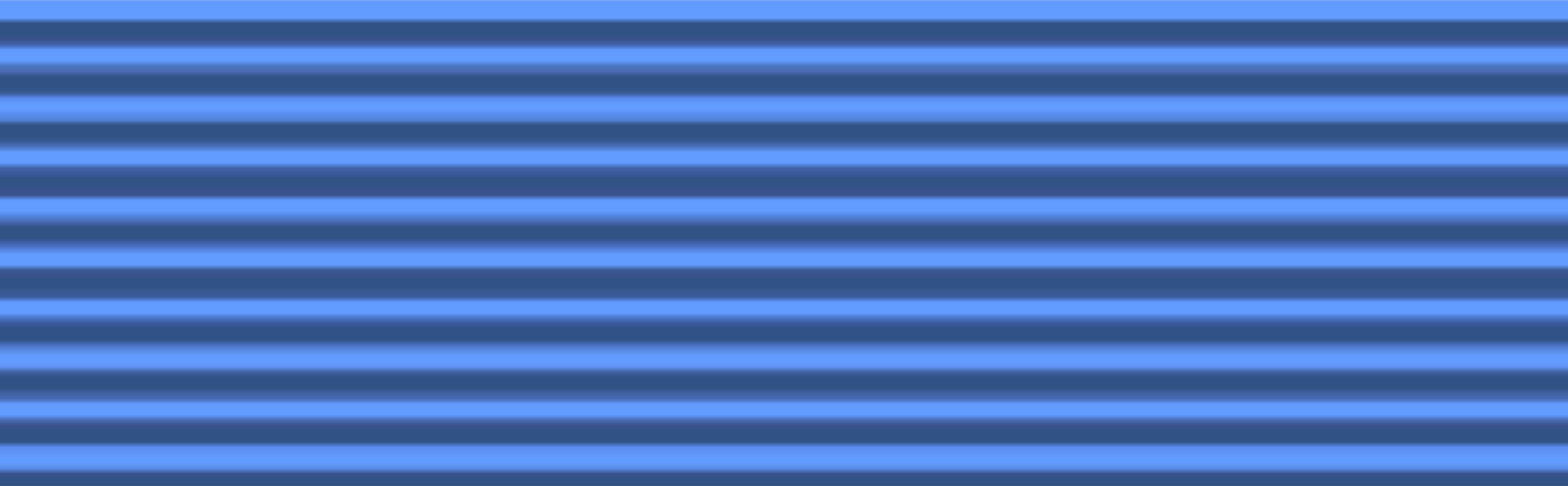

CONI: Golden Collar of Sports Merit: Collare d'Oro al Merito Sportivo: 2006

== See also ==
- List of European association football families
