= Gianluca Temelin =

Italian footballer

Personal information
- Full name: Gianluca Temelin
- Date of birth: 5 August 1976 (age 50)
- Place of birth: Pescara, Italia
- Height: 1.82 m (6 ft 0 in)
- Position: Striker

Team information
- Current team: Reggiana

Senior career*
| Years | Team | Apps | (Gls) |
| 1994–1996 | Atalanta | 2 | (0) |
| 1996–1997 | Solbiatese Arno | 28 | (7) |
| 1997–1998 | Albinese | 19 | (1) |
| 1998–1999 | Pro Sesto | 33 | (16) |
| 1999–2000 | Treviso | 13 | (1) |
| 2000–2004 | Spal | 77 | (19) |
| 2004 | → Messina (loan) | 1 | (0) |
| 2004–2007 | Pro Patria | 91 | (40) |
| 2007–2009 | Cremonese | 55 | (23) |
| 2009– | Reggiana | 9 | (3) |
- * Club domestic league appearances and goals as of 07:38, 4 January 2010 (UTC)

Gianluca Temelin (Pescara, 5 August 1976), is an Italian former footballer who played as a striker.

== Playing career ==
Temelin played in Italy's professional leagues for 19 years, scoring more than 100 goals in just over 400 competitive matches. He began his career with Serie A's Atalanta B.C. where he had a brief spell with the senior side.

Cresciuto calcisticamente nell'Atalanta dove esordi' in Serie B il 23 dicembre 1994 contro il Piacenza (0:0), a termine della stagione l'Atalanta torna in serie A. Nella stagione successiva esordisce in serie A il 25 febbraio 1996 in Inter-Atalanta 1:0, mentre il 18 maggio 1996 subentra nella finale di ritorno di Coppa Italia contro la Fiorentina allenata da Claudio Ranieri.

Terminata la carriera da calciatore nel Maggio 2014, a Settembre dello stesso anno inizia la sua nuova carriera da Allenatore nel Settore Giovanile della Pro Patria( Under 15), dal 1 Agosto 2015 al 30 Giugno 2017 allena nel Settore Giovanile del Pescara Calcio (Under 15,16). Dal 1 Agosto 2017 diventa Vice Allenatore in Serie D al Francavilla al Mare fino al 30 Giugno 2018, dal 1 Luglio 2018 entra a far parte del Settore Giovanile della Cremonese dove tutt'ora allena l'Under 17

== Honours ==
Atalanta

- Serie A Promotion: 1994–95

Albinese

- Serie C2 Play-off semi-final: 1997–98

Messina

- Serie A Promotion: 2003–04

Cremonese

- Serie C1 Play-off semi-final: 2007–08

Reggiana

- Lega Pro Prima Divisione Play-off semi-final: 2009–10
