= Stefano Salvatori =

Italian footballer

Personal information
- Date of birth: 29 December 1967
- Place of birth: Rome, Italy
- Date of death: 31 October 2017 (aged 49)
- Place of death: Australia
- Height: 1.80 m (5 ft 11 in)
- Positions: Midfielder; defender

Youth career
- 1984–1985: Lodigiani
- 1985–1987: Milan

Senior career*
Years	Team	Apps	(Gls)
1986–1987	Milan	0	(0)
1987–1988	Virescit Boccaleone	22	(0)
1988	Parma	7	(0)
1988–1989	Fiorentina	23	(1)
1989–1990	Milan	10	(0)
1990–1992	Fiorentina	45	(1)
1992–1994	SPAL	30	(0)
1994–1996	Atalanta	25	(0)
1996–1999	Heart of Midlothian	58	(1)
1999–2000	Alzano Virescit	41	(2)
2001	AlbinoLeffe	12	(0)
2001–2002	Legnano	25	(0)
Total		298	(5)

International career
1989–1990	Italy U-21	13	(0)
1989	Italy B		

Managerial career
- 2002–2005: Legnano
- 2005–2007: Voghera
- * Club domestic league appearances and goals

Stefano Salvatori (29 December 1967 – 31 October 2017) was an Italian professional footballer. A tenacious, physically strong, and hard-working player, known for his energetic and tough-tackling style of play, he usually played as a central midfielder, but was also capable of playing as a defensive midfielder, as a full-back or centre-back. He played for several clubs in his homeland, including Parma, Fiorentina, Milan and Atalanta, and the Scottish club Heart of Midlothian. Salvatori also represented Italy in under-21 and B international matches.

== Playing career ==
=== Club ===
After starting his youth career with local side Lodigiani, Salvatori joined the Milan youth system in 1985; after struggling to find space in the first team, he was initially sent on loan to lower division teams Virescit Boccaleone and Parma in order to gain experience and playing time; with Virescit, he managed a third-place finish in the 1987–88 Serie C1/A, but the club lost out to Reggina in the Serie B play-offs.

He later joined Fiorentina in 1988, where he made his Serie A debut, helping the club to qualify for the UEFA Cup in 1989.

He returned to Milan for a second spell with the club, during which he won the 1989 European Super Cup over Barcelona under manager Arrigo Sacchi, appearing as a defender in the first leg, a 1–1 away draw. Milan also reached the 1990 European Cup Final that season, and subsequently won the competition following a 1–0 victory over Benfica, but Salvatori did not feature in the squad for the final; he made one appearance in the competition, in the first leg of the quarter-finals, against Belgian side KV Mechelen, coming on as a substitute for Angelo Colombo, and was an unused substitute in first leg of the semi-finals against Bayern Munich. He also appeared as a substitute in the second leg of the Coppa Italia Final that year, which ended in a 1–0 home defeat to Juventus, who ultimately won the tournament on aggregate.

After still struggling to find space in the Milan first team, Salvatori returned to Fiorentina midway through the 1990–91 season, and remained with the club until 1992, making a total of 45 appearances in Serie A across his three seasons with the team, and scoring one goal. He then transferred to SPAL, and later joined Atalanta, helping the latter club to win promotion to Serie A in 1995, and subsequently reach the Coppa Italia final in 1996.

In 1996, Salvatori moved abroad to play for Hearts in Scotland. He was a member of the side that won the 1998 Scottish Cup Final in a 2–1 victory over Rangers on 16 May, the first time the Edinburgh-based side had won the title in 42 years; as a result, he still remains a popular figure with the club's fans. He scored one league goal during his spell at Hearts, in a 3–1 win at Dunfermline Athletic.

After three seasons in Scotland, collecting a total of 84 appearances and 3 goals across all competitions, Salvatori returned to Italy in 1999, where he ended his career in the lower divisions with Alzano Virescit, AlbinoLeffe, and Legnano, retiring in 2002.

=== International ===
At international level, Salvatori was capped 13 times for the Italy Under-21 side between 1989 and 1990.

== After retirement ==
After retiring from professional football, Salvatori worked as a coach in Italy with Legnano and Voghera; he later returned to Scotland in 2011 to work as a football agent, before moving to Australia in 2013, where he managed a series of football academies, focussing on the development of young local talent in the areas of Brisbane and Sydney.

== Death ==
Salvatori died on 31 October 2017, aged 49, from cancer.

== Honours ==
Milan

- UEFA Super Cup winner: 1989.
- UEFA Champions League winner: 1989–90.

Hearts

- Scottish Cup winner: 1998.
