= 1995–96 Coppa Italia =

Tournament details
- Country: Italy
- Dates: 20 Aug 1995 – 18 May 1996
- Teams: 48

Final positions
- Champions: Fiorentina (5th title)
- Runners-up: Atalanta

Tournament statistics
- Matches played: 54
- Goals scored: 130 (2.41 per match)
- Top goal scorer: Gabriel Batistuta (8 goals)

The 1995–96 Coppa Italia, the 49th staging of the major domestic tournament in Italian football, won by Fiorentina, took place from 20 August 1995 to 18 March 1996.

== First round ==
Home team	Score	Away team
Avellino (2)	1-0	Fidelis Andria (2)
Varese (4)	0-1	Cremonese (1)
Pistoiese (3)	0-1	Perugia (2)
Lucchese (2)	4-0	Ancona (2)
Trapani (3)	1-1 (5-6p)	Reggiana (2)
Bologna (2)	2-0	Hellas Verona (2)
Forlì (3)	1-0	Foggia (2)
Como (3)	0-1	Pescara (2)
Reggina (2)	1-2 (aet)	Chievo (2)
Gualdo Casacastalda (3)	0-4	Genoa (2)
Cosenza (2)	0-0 (5-6p)	Venezia (2)
Fiorenzuola (3)	2-1	Brescia (2)
Ascoli (3)	0-0 (3-1p)	Salernitana (2)
Lecce (3)	2-1	Cesena (2)
Monza (3)	0-2	Padova (1)
Acireale (3)	0-2	Palermo (2)

p=after penalty shoot-out

== Second round ==
Home team	Score	Away team
Avellino (2)	1-4	Juventus (1)
Atalanta (1)	2-2 (4-2p)	Cremonese (1)
Perugia (2)	0-1	Sampdoria (1)
Lucchese (2)	3-4 (aet)	Cagliari (1)
Reggiana (2)	2-0	Bari (1)
Bologna (2)	1-0	Roma (1)
Forlì (3)	1-1 (4-3p)	Piacenza (1)
Pescara (2)	1-4	Milan (1)
Chievo (2)	1-1 (3-4p)	Lazio (1)
Udinese (1)	3-0	Genoa (2)
Venezia (2)	0-0 (5-6p)	Internazionale (1)
Fiorenzuola (3)	2-1	Torino (1)
Ascoli (3)	1-2	Fiorentina (1)
Lecce (3)	1-0	Napoli (1)
Vicenza (1)	4-2	Padova (1)
Palermo (2)	3-0	Parma (1)

p=after penalty shoot-out

== Third round ==
Home team	Score	Away team
Atalanta (1)	1-0 (aet)	Juventus (1)
Cagliari (1)	2-1	Sampdoria (1)
Bologna (2)	3-0	Reggiana (2)
Forlì (3)	0-2	Milan (1)
Udinese (1)	0-1	Lazio (1)
Fiorenzuola (3)	1-2	Internazionale (1)
Lecce (3)	0-5	Fiorentina (1)
Palermo (2)	1-0	Vicenza (1)

== Knockout stage ==
Quarter-Finals
Cagliari	1	2	3
Atalanta	0	4	4
Bologna (p)	1	1	2
Milan	1	1	2
Internazionale	1	1	2
Lazio	1	0	1
Fiorentina	1	2	3
Palermo	1	0	1

Semi-Finals
Atalanta	1	2	3
Bologna	1	0	1
Internazionale	1	0	1
Fiorentina	3	1	4

Final
Atalanta	0	0	0
Fiorentina	1	2	3

=== Quarter-finals ===
Team 1	Agg.	Team 2	1st leg	2nd leg
Cagliari	3-4	Atalanta	1–0	2-4
Bologna	2-2 (7-6p)	Milan	1–1	1-1
Internazionale	2-1	Lazio	1–1	1-0
Fiorentina	3-1	Palermo	1–0	2-1

p=after penalty shoot-out

=== Semi-finals ===
Team 1	Agg.	Team 2	1st leg	2nd leg
Bologna	1-3	Atalanta	1–1	0-2
Fiorentina	4-1	Internazionale	3-1	1-0

Bologna vs. Atalanta

Bologna	1–1	Atalanta
Antonio Paganin 50' (o.g.)	Report	Valentini 84'

Stadio Renato Dall'Ara, Bologna
Referee: Marcello Nicchi (Italy)

Atalanta	2–0	Bologna
Vieri 31' 90'	Report

Stadio Atleti Azzurri d'Italia, Bergamo
Attendance: 12,428
Referee: Loris Stafoggia (Italy)

Fiorentina vs. Internazionale

Fiorentina	3–1	Internazionale
Batistuta 14' (pen.) 48' 86'	Report	Ganz 32'

Stadio Artemio Franchi, Florence
Attendance: 27,645
Referee: Gianni Beschin (Italy)

Internazionale	0–1	Fiorentina
	Report	Batistuta 78'

San Siro, Milan
Attendance: 53,737
Referee: Graziano Cesari (Italy)

== Final ==
=== First leg ===
2 May 1996
21:00

Fiorentina	1–0	Atalanta
Batistuta 52'

Artemio Franchi, Florence
Attendance: 39,992
Referee: Robert Boggi

=== Second leg ===
18 May 1996
21:00

Atalanta	0–2	Fiorentina
		L. Amoruso 48'; Batistuta 61'

Stadio Atleti Azzurri d'Italia, Bergamo
Attendance: 25,977
Referee: Pierluigi Pairetto

Fiorentina won 3–0 on aggregate.

== Top goalscorers ==
Rank	Player	Club	Goals
1	(Argentina) Gabriel Batistuta	Fiorentina	8
2	(Italy) Francesco Baiano	Fiorentina	3
2	(Italy) Andrea Pistella	Lucchese	3
2	(Italy) Dario Morello	Bologna	3
