= Vincenzo Chianese =

Italian footballer

Personal information
- Date of birth: 14 January 1976 (age 50)
- Place of birth: Melito di Napoli, Italy
- Height: 1.73 m (5 ft 8 in)
- Position: Forward

Youth career
- ?–1995: Atalanta

Senior career*
Years	Team	Apps	(Gls)
1994–1998	Atalanta	2	(0)
1995–1996	→ Casarano (loan)	32	(10)
1996–1998	→ Foggia (loan)	59	(22)
1998–2001	Salernitana	35	(1)
2000	→ Fermana (loan)	17	(7)
2001	Pescara	17	(1)
2001–2002	Vicenza	18	(1)
2002–2004	Como	30	(1)
2002–2003	→ Treviso (loan)	29	(11)
2004–2005	Teramo	31	(5)
2005–2006	Pavia	30	(14)
2006–2008	Ravenna	50	(22)
2008–2010	Arezzo	68	(34)
2010–2011	Ravenna	16	(3)
2011–2012	Brindisi	13	(6)
2012–2013	Verbano	6	(0)
2013	Larcianese	?	(?)
2014	Cairese	?	(?)

International career
1993–1994	Italy U18	7	(3)
- * Club domestic league appearances and goals

Vincenzo Chianese (born 14 January 1976) is an Italian former footballer who spent most of his career in Serie B and Lega Pro Prima Divisione (previously known as Serie C1). Chianese had a scoring ratio of 0.4 goals per game in Lega Pro Prima Divisione where he scored more than 90 goals, but just a handful in Serie B.

== Biography ==
Born in Melito di Napoli, Chianese started his career at Atalanta Bergamo. In 1995–96 season he went on loan to Serie C1 side Casarano. In 1995, he left for Serie B side Foggia in co-ownership deal. He was bought back a year later and loaned back to Foggia. In August 1998, he left for Salernitana of Serie A. He failed to score for the team and followed the team relegated to Serie B. He just played 5 league matches in Serie B 1999–2000 before leaving on loan to league rival Fermana. In Serie B 2000–01 he scored once in 12 league matches before leaving for another league rival Pescara in January 2001. After the relegation of Pescara he joined Vicenza of Serie B, which was newly relegated from Serie A. In 2002, he was signed by Como of Serie A but left on loan to Serie C1 side Treviso before the start of the season. He returned to Como, which had been meanwhile relegated to Serie B, where he played 30 league matches and scored 1 goal. In 2004–05 season, he left for Teramo and next season for Pavia, both of them in Serie C1.

In 2006, he signed a 2-year contract with Serie C1 side Ravenna where he won the championship. In the next season he just scored 3 goals in 18 appearances, and left for Serie C1 side Arezzo in January 2008. In Lega Pro Prima Divisione 2008–09 season he scored 15 goals and helped the team reach the promotion playoffs. Where the team lost to Crotone (which later became the winner) in semifinal.

=== International career ===
He played with Italy U-18 at 1994 UEFA European Under-18 Football Championship qualification losing to Russia U-18 in the qualification playoffs.

== Honours ==
- Serie C1 (2): 2002–2003; 2006–2007
