= Fabrizio Ferron =

Italian footballer

Personal information
- Full name: Fabrizio Ferron
- Date of birth: 5 September 1965 (age 61)
- Place of birth: Bollate, Italy
- Height: 1.82 m (6 ft 0 in)
- Position: Goalkeeper

Youth career
- 1985–1986: AC Milan

Senior career*
Years	Team	Apps	(Gls)
1986–1988	Sambenedettese	56	(0)
1988–1996	Atalanta	253	(0)
1996–1999	Sampdoria	95	(0)
1999–2000	Internazionale	4	(0)
2000–2002	Verona	64	(0)
2002–2004	Como	45	(0)
2004–2005	Bologna	0	(0)
- * Club domestic league appearances and goals

Fabrizio Ferron (born 5 September 1965) is an Italian former footballer who played as a goalkeeper. He played over 300 games in Serie A.

== Football career ==
Ferron started his career with the AC Milan youth team. He then played for Sambenedettese, before spending 8 seasons at Atalanta.

On 23 February 1992, Ferron suffered the infamy of conceding a late equaliser to Michelangelo Rampulla, the opposing goalkeeper for Cremonese, who became the first goalkeeper to score from open play in Serie A history.

In a 0–3 loss away to Reggiana on 23 January 1994, Ferron's heart stopped beating for some 15 seconds after a collision with an opposing striker. Luckily, he was revived shortly afterwards.

He then played for Sampdoria, and subsequently for Internazionale, as a backup to Angelo Peruzzi.

He joined Verona in summer 2000. In summer 2002, he joined Serie A newcomer Como, where he competed with Alex Brunner for a starting spot. He played his last Serie A match against Modena FC on 27 April 2003, at the age of 37 years, 234 days. Due to Brunner's departure and the club's relegation, he became the regular starter for Como, ahead of Stefano Layeni. In the summer of 2004, he joined Bologna as a backup to Gianluca Pagliuca, who was one year younger than Ferron.

== Style of play ==
An experienced and well-rounded goalkeeper, Ferron was known for his composed and efficient style of goalkeeping. He possessed good intuition and a strong positional sense, and was also known for his athleticism, agility, shot-stopping, punching ability, and reflexes, which enabled him to produce spectacular dives and acrobatic saves when necessary, without having to resort to histrionics; moreover, he stood out for his consistency throughout his career, and was considered one of the most reliable goalkeepers in Serie A during the 1990s.

== Honours ==
Atalanta

- Serie A promotion: 1994–95
- Coppa Italia runner-up: 1995–96

Inter

- Coppa Italia runner-up: 1999–2000
