= José Herrera (Uruguayan footballer) =

Uruguayan footballer (born 1965)

Personal information
- Full name: José Oscar Herrera Corominas
- Date of birth: 17 June 1965 (age 61)
- Place of birth: Tala, Uruguay
- Height: 1.82 m (6 ft 0 in)
- Position: Defender

Senior career*
| Years | Team | Apps | (Gls) |
| 1984–1989 | Peñarol | 137 | (18) |
| 1989–1990 | Figueres | 23 | (5) |
| 1990–1995 | Cagliari | 147 | (13) |
| 1995–1996 | Atalanta | 41 | (2) |
| 1997 | Cruz Azul | 12 | (1) |
| 1997–1998 | Newell's Old Boys | 11 | (0) |
| 1998 | Peñarol | 11 | (1) |
| 1999 | Racing Montevideo | 26 | (7) |
| 2000 | Montevideo Wanderers | 31 | (2) |
| 2001 | Peñarol | 5 | (1) |
| 2001 | Shandong Luneng | ? | (?) |
| 2001 | Persib | 8 | (0) |
| 2002 | Montevideo Wanderers | | |
| 2003 | Peñarol | | |

International career
| 1988–1997 | Uruguay | 57 | (4) |
Medal record
Representing Uruguay
Copa América
| Winner | 1995 Uruguay |
| Runner-up | 1989 Brazil |
- * Club domestic league appearances and goals

José Oscar Herrera Corominas (born 17 June 1965) is a Uruguayan former international footballer who played as a defender for various clubs.

== Club career ==
Herrera started his playing career with Peñarol where he was part of two championship winning squads in (1985 & 1986) and a winner of the Copa Libertadores in 1987.

In 1989, he joined Figueres of Spain, and in 1990 he joined Cagliari in Italy where he played over 100 games for the club.

In 1995, he joined Atalanta and in 1996 he moved to Mexico to play for Cruz Azul. In 1997, he played for Newell's Old Boys of Argentina.

Herrera returned to Uruguay later in his career where he played for Peñarol, Racing Club de Montevideo and Montevideo Wanderers.

== International career ==
At international level, Herrera played for the Uruguay national team on 57 occasions between 1988 and 1997, scoring four goals. He was part of the squad that won the Copa América in 1995.

== Personal life ==
Herrera's daughter, Sofia, married Uruguayan international Diego Godín.

== Honours ==
=== Club ===
Peñarol

- Uruguayan Primera: 1985, 1986
- Copa Libertadores: 1987

=== International ===
Uruguay

- Copa América: 1995
