= Franco Rotella =

Italian footballer

Personal information
- Date of birth: 16 November 1966
- Place of birth: Genoa, Italy
- Date of death: 20 April 2009 (aged 42)
- Place of death: Genoa, Italy
- Position: Midfielder

Youth career
- –1983: Genoa

Senior career*
Years	Team	Apps	(Gls)
1983–1991	Genoa	83	(4)
1985–1986	→ SPAL (loan)	27	(3)
1990	→ Triestina (loan)	25	(2)
1991–1994	Pisa	105	(7)
1994–1997	Atalanta	46	(2)
1997–1998	Imperia	24	(7)
Total		310	(25)
- * Club domestic league appearances and goals

Franco Rotella (16 November 1966 – 20 April 2009) was an Italian professional footballer who played as a midfielder. He made over 300 league appearances in Italian football for Genoa, SPAL, Triestina, Pisa, Atalanta, and Imperia.
