= Federico Pisani =

Italian footballer (1974–1997)

Personal information
- Date of birth: 25 July 1974
- Place of birth: Castelnuovo di Garfagnana, Italy
- Date of death: 12 February 1997 (aged 22)
- Place of death: Milan, Italy
- Position: Forward

Youth career
- Atalanta

Senior career*
Years	Team	Apps	(Gls)
1992–1997	Atalanta	64	(6)
1993	→ Monza (loan)	21	(2)
Total		85	(8)
- * Club domestic league appearances and goals

Federico Pisani (25 July 1974 – 12 February 1997) was an Italian professional footballer who played as a forward for Atalanta and Monza. Pisani died in a car crash on 12 February 1997, and his squad number (#14) was retired as a mark of respect.

== Career ==
Pisani began playing for Atalanta's youth team and after a few years joined the Margine Coperta, a satellite club of Atalanta. Returning to Bergamo, he made his debut in Serie A at the age of 17. In the Primavera team, he was coached by Cesare Prandelli and often used as a substitute.

Pisani died in a car accident with his BMW 320 convertible in the company of his girlfriend Alessandra Midali (who also died) and two friends (who were uninjured) on 12 February 1997. Pisani was returning home after an evening at the Campione d'Italia casino.

Following the death of Pisani, Atalanta retired the number 14 jersey. In his short Serie A career, he made 44 appearances and scored five goals.

The main stadium of the Atalanta training centre and the Curva Nord of the Stadio Atleti Azzurri d'Italia are both named after him.
