= Fabio Gallo =

Italian footballer (born 1970)

Personal information
- Date of birth: 11 September 1970 (age 56)
- Place of birth: Bollate, Italy
- Height: 1.76 m (5 ft 9 in)
- Position: Midfielder

Team information
- Current team: Vicenza (head coach)

Youth career
- Inter

Senior career*
Years	Team	Apps	(Gls)
1988–1989	Inter	0	(0)
1989–1991	Oltrepò	56	(3)
1991–1992	Spezia	26	(2)
1992–1993	Alessandria	14	(0)
1992–1995	Brescia	77	(6)
1995–2001	Atalanta	156	(1)
2001–2002	Ternana	9	(0)
2001–2002	Como	18	(0)
2002–2005	Treviso	96	(17)
2005–2006	Torino	21	(0)
2005–2006	Treviso	15	(0)
2006–2007	Torino	31	(5)
2007–2009	Novara	38	(5)
Total		557	(39)

Managerial career
- 2009–2012: Atalanta (youth)
- 2012: Giacomense
- 2013: Brescia (assistant)
- 2014–2016: Spezia Primavera
- 2016–2017: Como
- 2017–2018: Spezia
- 2019–2020: Ternana
- 2021: Potenza
- 2022–2023: Foggia
- 2023–2025: Virtus Entella
- 2025–: Vicenza
- * Club domestic league appearances and goals

Fabio Gallo (born 11 September 1970) is an Italian football coach and former player who played as a midfielder. He is the head coach of Serie B club Vicenza.

== Playing career ==
Between 1988 and 2007, Gallo played for Inter, Oltrepò, Spezia, Alessandria, Brescia, Atalanta, Ternana, Como, Treviso, Torino and Novara.

== Coaching career ==
Gallo started his coaching career as Atalanta's youth team coach.

In the 2012–13 season, he was appointed head coach of Giacomense in Lega Pro Seconda Divisione until 4 December 2012, when he was sacked after a heavy 7–0 defeat against Renate.

On 14 February 2019, Gallo was appointed as the manager of Ternana. His contract expired at the end of the 2019–20 season and was not extended.

On 5 February 2021, he was appointed new head coach of Serie C club Potenza, replacing Ezio Capuano. After escaping relegation by the end of the season, he was confirmed for the following 2021–22 Serie C campaign, but was dismissed on 21 October 2021 following a dismal start in the new season.

In June 2022, Gallo joined Gianni De Biasi's Azerbaijan national football team coaching staff as an assistant. On 4 October 2022, he was hired by Serie C club Foggia as their new manager, signing a contract until the end of the season. He resigned on 22 February 2023, due to disagreements with the board.

On 20 September 2023, Gallo was hired as the new head coach of Serie C club Virtus Entella. After guiding Virtus Entella to promotion to Serie B as 2024–25 Serie C Group B champions, he departed to become the new head coach of Vicenza.

== Managerial statistics ==
As of match played 21 November 2026

Managerial record by team and tenure
Team	From	To	Record							
Team	From	To	G	W	D	L	GF	GA	GD	Win %
Giacomense	19 June 2012	4 December 2012	17	3	5	9	20	29	−9	17.65
Como	22 June 2016	26 May 2017	44	18	14	12	62	56	+6	40.91
Spezia	14 June 2017	20 June 2018	44	14	14	16	49	47	+2	31.82
Ternana	14 February 2019	14 July 2020	56	22	22	12	62	50	+12	39.29
Potenza	5 February 2021	21 October 2021	26	7	9	10	30	37	−7	26.92
Foggia	4 October 2022	21 February 2023	27	14	7	6	46	24	+22	51.85
Virtus Entella	20 September 2023	24 June 2025	78	37	25	16	100	58	+42	47.44
Vicenza	26 June 2025	Present	56	31	13	12	94	63	+31	55.36
Total			348	146	109	93	462	364	+98	41.95

== Honours ==
=== Player ===
Brescia

- Anglo-Italian Cup: 1993–94

Treviso

- Supercoppa di Lega Serie C1: 2002–03

=== Manager ===
Virtus Entella

- Serie C: 2024–25
- Supercoppa di Serie C: 2025
