= Stadio di Bergamo =

Stadium in Bergamo, Italy

New Balance Arena
- Stadio di Bergamo
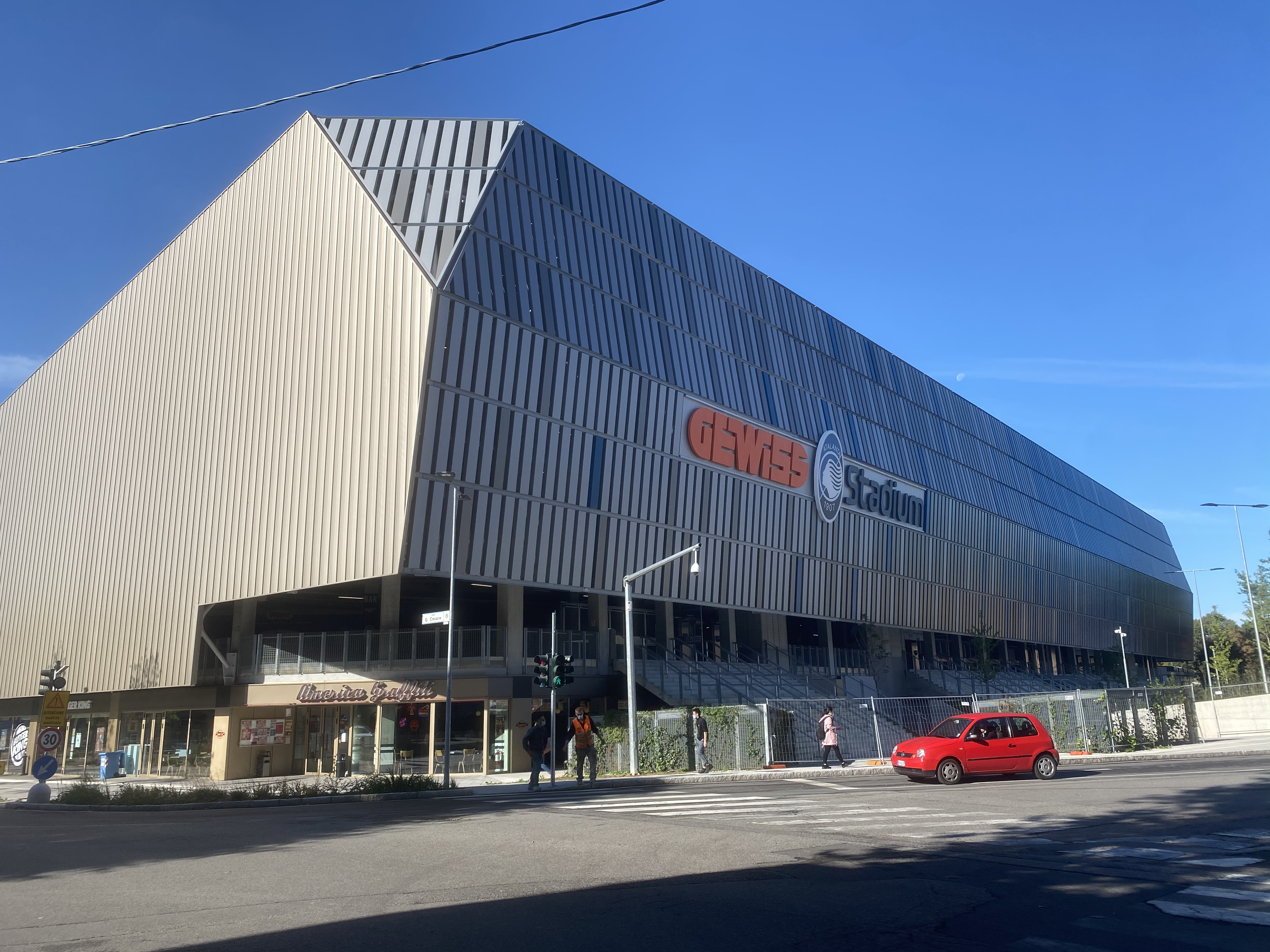
- UEFA
- Interactive map of New Balance Arena
- Former names: Stadio Mario Brumana (1928–1945); Stadio Comunale; Stadio Atleti Azzurri d'Italia; Gewiss Stadium (2019–2025); New Balance Arena (2025–present)
- Location: Bergamo, Italy
- Coordinates: 45°42′32″N 9°40′51″E
- Owner: Stadio Atalanta S.r.l.
- Capacity: 23,439
- Surface: FLexGrass Vertix hybrid grass
- Field size: 105 m × 68 m (344 ft × 223 ft)

Construction
- Groundbreaking: 1927
- Opened: 23 December 1928
- Renovated: 1949, 1984, 2015, 2019–2024

Tenants
- Atalanta (1928–present); AlbinoLeffe (2003–2019); Italy national football team (selected matches)

The New Balance Arena, known as the Stadio di Bergamo (English: Stadio of Bergamo), in UEFA competitions, is a stadium in Bergamo, Italy. It is the home of Serie A club Atalanta and has a capacity of 23,439 seats. The field is 120 m (130 yd) long and 70 m (77 yd) wide. Atalanta has owned the stadium since 2017, having purchased it from the comune.

Atalanta's under-23 team and youth team sometimes play competitive matches at the stadium. The stadium in Bergamo has also been used as a home ground by local club AlbinoLeffe from 2003 to 2019 (when it moved to Gorgonzola)—a period during which AlbinoLeffe spent nine years in Serie B and met Atalanta on several occasions—and for various matches of the Italy national team.

== History ==
=== Early years ===
With the growth of football in the 1920s, Atalanta needed a new stadium with considerably larger capacity than its previous grounds. The new stadium was constructed on Viale Margherita (now Viale Giulio Cesare), replacing a hippodrome that once occupied the site. Construction of the new stadium took one year; it opened in 1928 and cost 3.5 million lire. The stadium was named after fascist Mario Brumana; this was common naming practice in fascist Italy. The Brumana stadium was much larger than the Clementina field, having a seated capacity of 12,000 spectators in two tribune (side stands) and a larger field measuring 110 by 70 metres (360 by 230 ft); it also featured a running track, as it was planned to form part of a larger complex. On 1 November 1928, Atalanta played its first unofficial match at the stadium (a 4–2 victory against Triestina); the stadium was then officially inaugurated on 23 December 1928, when Atalanta defeated La Dominante Genova 2–0 in front of over 14,000 spectators.

After World War II, the stadium was renamed the Stadio Comunale ("Municipal Stadium"), as fascism no longer existed in Italy. Expansion of the stadium began in the years following the war: the construction of a south stand (the Curva Sud) began in 1949, and a second stand at the north end (the Curva Nord) followed during the 1960s, opening in 1971. Later, in 1984, the running track was removed in order to expand the stadium's capacity upon Atalanta's return to Serie A after five years. The club's first match in the 1984–85 Serie A, a 1–1 draw against Inter, had an attendance of over 43,000 spectators, a record attendance for the Stadio Comunale. (Note: The club's home attendance record was later broken in 2020, though that match was not played in Bergamo.)

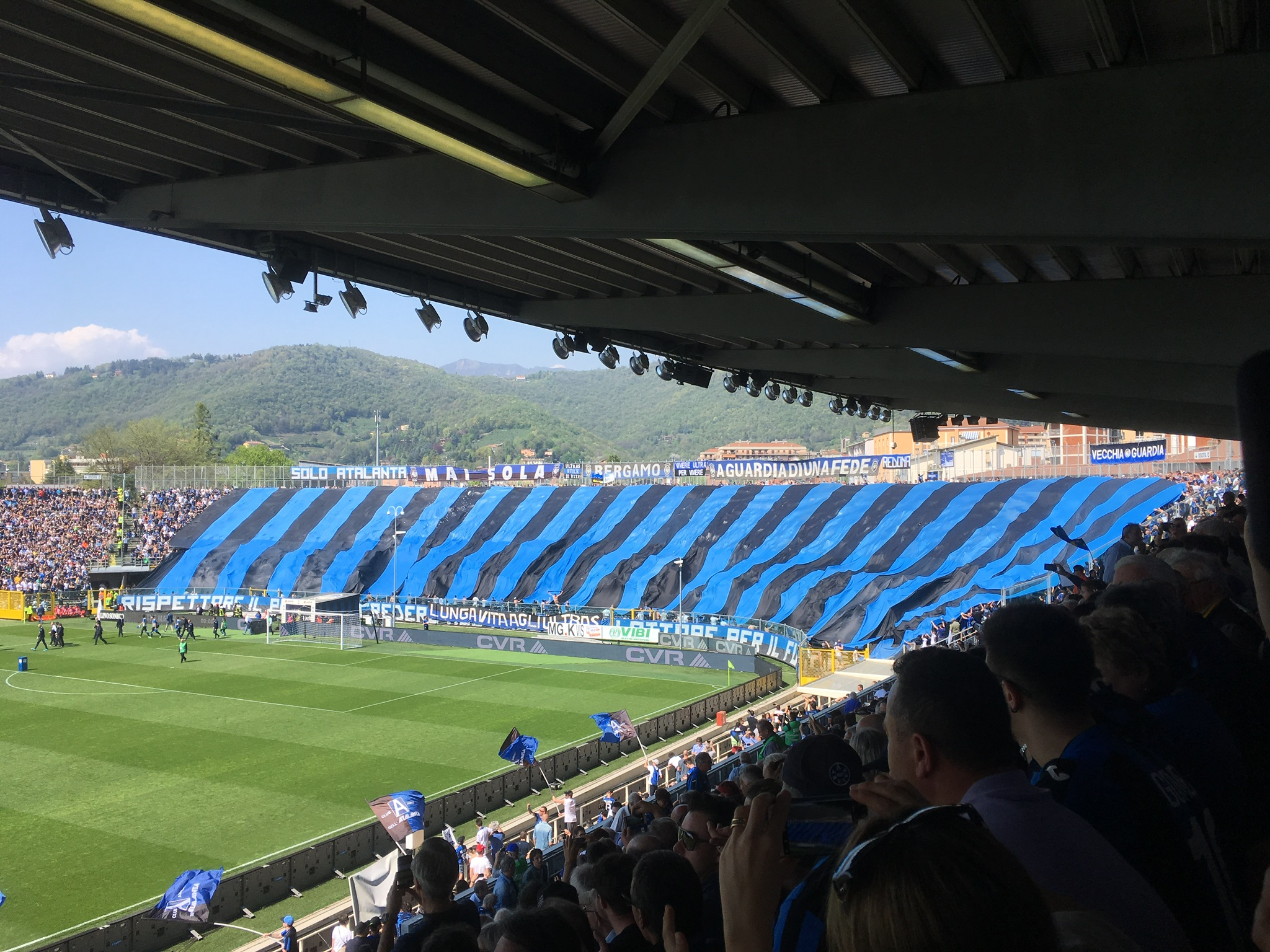
The old Curva Nord in 2018

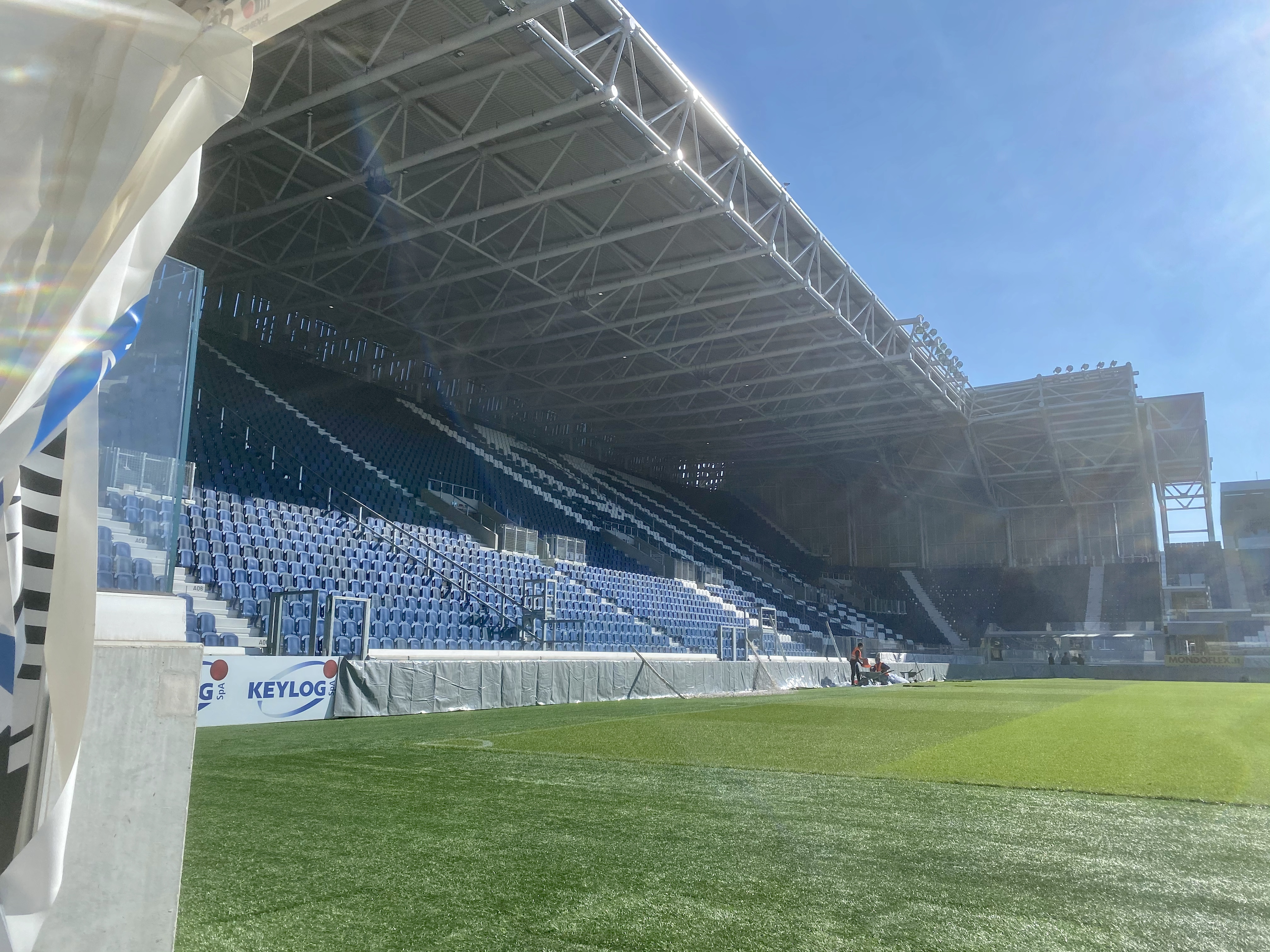
The new Curva Nord in 2020

=== Modernization projects ===
The Tribuna Giulio Cesare underwent modernization during the early 1990s, and the stadium was renamed the Stadio Atleti Azzurri d'Italia ("Blue Athletes of Italy") in 1994. In 1997, following the death of 22-year-old forward Federico Pisani in a car accident, the Curva Nord was nicknamed the Curva Pisani in his honor. Similarly, the Curva Sud was nicknamed the Curva Morosini in 2012 to posthumously honor 25-year-old youth academy player Piermario Morosini, who died following collapse on the field during a Serie B match between Pescara and Livorno. In 2015, the stadium also expanded its side stands to offer pitchside views only several meters (feet) from the benches, a revolutionary feature of Italian stadiums at the time. This phase of improvements also included improved bench facilities for players and the introduction of luxury boxes atop the grandstand. New seating areas for disabled spectators were also added. At the same time, the press box has been lowered and moved towards the pitch. These improvements came with a reduction in overall capacity by around 3,000 seats. The club paid €2.6 million for the first phase of redevelopment.

On 10 May 2017, Atalanta announced the acquisition of the stadium from the comune for 8.6 million euros, becoming one of only four Serie A clubs to own its home stadium. (Note: The other three are Juventus, Sassuolo, and Udinese. All the remaining Serie A clubs play in municipally-owned stadiums.) This acquisition allowed the club to authorize a renovation project for the stadium, for like many Italian stadiums, much of its structure and facilities were considered outdated. This renovation project was also necessary to upgrade the stadium to meet UEFA standards for hosting matches in UEFA competitions. Because the stadium was not ready at the time, Atalanta had to play its Europa League home matches at the Mapei Stadium in Reggio Emilia and its Champions League home matches in its debut season at San Siro in Milan. Despite not playing in Bergamo, though thanks to the additional capacity of San Siro, Atalanta recorded its record home attendance of 44,236 during a Champions League knockout stage match against Valencia on 19 February 2020.

Following a sponsorship agreement with electronics company Gewiss, the stadium was renamed the Gewiss Stadium on 1 July 2019. On 30 April 2019, a new phase of renovations began with the demolition of the Curva Nord "Federico Pisani" (North Stand). On 6 October 2019, the renovated Curva Nord was inaugurated for Atalanta's home match against Lecce; it has covered seating for over 9,000 spectators. A year later, both side stands underwent modernization and the Curva Sud had temporary seats installed on the concrete. These upgrades allowed Atalanta to play its Champions League matches in Bergamo starting in the 2020–21 season. The final phase called for a new Curva Sud (mirroring the rebuilt Curva Nord), increasing the stadium's capacity to about 25,000, as well as construction of a new underground parking garage and other improvements to the stadium's surroundings. It was originally expected to be completed in 2021, though was delayed several times. Construction began in spring 2024, temporarily reducing the stadium's capacity but otherwise not obliging the club's home matches to be played at another stadium, and the renovated Curva Sud opened on 8 September 2024, for the club's first home match of the 2024–25 season.

In 2025, following the expiration of the club's sponsorship agreement with Gewiss, the stadium was no longer known officially as the Gewiss Stadium and a new sponsorship deal was signed with sportswear company New Balance.

== International matches ==
Various international matches have also been played in Bergamo, though the stadium was not selected as a venue in any of the international tournaments hosted by Italy. The Italy national team's most recent match in Bergamo was a 1–1 draw with the Netherlands in the UEFA Nations League on 14 October 2020. Prior to this, Italy had not played an international match in Bergamo since 2006; renovations to the stadium in 2019–2020 brought it up to UEFA standards. This match was played in Bergamo as a homage to the city, as it was an early epicenter during the COVID-19 pandemic in Italy.

=== List of international matches ===
Football at the 1964 Summer Olympics – Men's qualification
11 March 1964

Italy	7–1	Turkey

Stadio Comunale, Bergamo
UEFA Euro 1988 qualifying
24 January 1987
14:30 CET

Italy	5–0	Malta
Bagni 4'; Bergomi 9'; Altobelli 24', 35'; Vialli 45'	Report

Stadio Comunale, Bergamo
Referee: Hadjistefanou (Cyprus)
Friendly
15 November 2006
20:50 CET

Italy	1–1	Turkey
Di Natale 39'	Report	Materazzi 43' (o.g.)

Stadio Atleti Azzurri d'Italia, Bergamo
Attendance: 21,334
Referee: Massimo Busacca (Switzerland)
Friendly
3 June 2016
20:30 CEST

Ukraine	3–1	Albania
Stepanenko 8'; Yarmolenko 49'; Konoplyanka 87'	Report	Sadiku 12'

Stadio Atleti Azzurri d'Italia, Bergamo
Attendance: 10,496
Referee: Paolo Mazzoleni (Italy)
Friendly
1 June 2018
21:15 CEST

Egypt	0–0	Colombia
	Report

Stadio Atleti Azzurri d'Italia, Bergamo
Attendance: 3,883
Referee: Paolo Mazzoleni (Italy)
2020–21 UEFA Nations League A
14 October 2020
20:45

Italy	1–1	Netherlands
Pellegrini 16'	Report	Van de Beek 25'

Stadio Atleti Azzurri d'Italia, Bergamo
Attendance: 623
Referee: Anthony Taylor (England)
2026 FIFA World Cup qualification
5 September 2025
20:45

Italy	5–0	Estonia
Kean 58'; Retegui 69', 89'; Raspadori 71'; Bastoni 90+2'	Report

Stadio Atleti Azzurri d'Italia, Bergamo
Attendance: 22,559
Referee: João Pinheiro (Portugal)
2026 FIFA World Cup qualification
26 March 2026
20:45

Italy	2–0	Northern Ireland
Tonali 56'; Kean 80'	Report

Stadio Atleti Azzurri d'Italia, Bergamo
Attendance: 23,439
Referee: Danny Makkelie (Netherlands)

== Awards ==
The Stadio di Bergamo received the Most Valuable Field award during the Serie A Awards in 2023.
