= Mauro Valentini (footballer, born 1964) =

Italian footballer

Personal information
- Date of birth: 4 January 1964 (age 62)
- Place of birth: Viterbo
- Position: Defender

Senior career*
Years	Team	Apps	(Gls)
1983–1991	Cagliari		
1991–1996	Atalanta		
1996–1998	Lucchese		
1998–2001	Viterbese		
2002–2003	SP La Fiorita		
- * Club domestic league appearances and goals

Mauro Valentini (born 4 January 1964) is a retired Italian football defender.
