= 1989–90 AC Fiorentina season =

Associazione Calcio Fiorentina
1989-90 season
- President: Lorenzo Righetti
- Manager: Bruno Giorgi (until 26 March 1990); Francesco Graziani
- Stadium: Comunale
- Serie A: 12th
- Coppa Italia: First round
- UEFA Cup: Final
- Top goalscorer: League: Roberto Baggio (17); All: Baggio (19)
Home colours	Away colours

During the 1989-90 season A.C. Fiorentina competed in Serie A, Coppa Italia and UEFA Cup.

== Summary ==
During summer Swedish manager Sven-Göran Eriksson left the club to manage Benfica. Then, the club appointed Bruno Giorgi who has fired on 1 May 1990. New coach Francesco Graziani, manage the team avoiding relegation to 1990-91 Serie B with a 4-1 against Atalanta B.C. in the last round of the League tournament.

The club transferred out forward Stefano Borgonovo to A.C. Milan, replaced by Argentine striker Oscar Dertycia who was injured during half of campaign. Swedish central back Glenn Hysén signed with an English club. Other arrivals were Renato Buso, Giuseppe Volpecina, Stefano Pioli, Czech midfielder Luboš Kubík, Giuseppe Iachini, Marco Nappi, Mario Faccenda and young players such as Alberto Malusci and Giacomo Banchelli.

Owing to rebuilding actions in its Comunale for the upcoming 1990 FIFA World Cup the squad played several matches in Pistoia, Perugia and Arezzo.

In Coppa Italia the team won over Licata, in second round eliminated Como 1907, reaching the semifinals stage, being eliminated by Maradona S.S.C. Napoli's.

In UEFA Cup the squad eliminated Atletico Madrid, Sochaux, Dinamo Kyiv, AJ Auxerre and Werder Bremen, reaching the Final against Juventus, being the first Italian final in the history of UEFA tournaments. The team was defeated after two legs, included a fans riot in Avellino a location appointed by UEFA after a previous riot in semifinals against Werder Bremen.

The club disputed three finals in three UEFA tournaments in its history: European Cup (on 31 May 1957 lost against Real Madrid), UEFA Cup Winners' Cup (on 17 and 27 May 1961 defeated Glasgow Rangers and lost against Atletico Madrid on 5 September 1962) and UEFA Cup (on 2 and 16 May 1990 lost against Juventus).

One day after the 1990 UEFA Cup Final match lost, the Pontello announced the transfer out of Roberto Baggio to Juventus. Then, a roit of the viola fans erupted in Florence with attacks to the club owners home. The riot was out of control several days including Viola fans arrests.

During summer of 1990, the viola fans continued their riots, this time against the Italy national football team and the upcoming 1990 FIFA World Cup in Coverciano nearby Florence until the Italian Football Federation relocated the squad to Marino, nearby Rome due to safety concerns.

== Squad ==
Note: Flags indicate national team as defined under FIFA eligibility rules; some limited exceptions apply. Players may hold more than one non-FIFA nationality.

Pos.	Nation	Player
GK	ITA	Giuseppe Pellicanò
GK	ITA	Marco Landucci
DF	ITA	Giuseppe Antonaccio
DF	ITA	Sergio Battistini (Captain)
DF	ITA	Roberto Bosco
DF	ITA	Stefano Daniel
DF	ITA	Alberto Di Chiara
DF	ITA	Mario Faccenda
DF	ITA	Alberto Malusci
DF	ITA	Stefano Pioli
DF	ITA	Celeste Pin
DF	ITA	Giuseppe Volpecina
MF	ITA	Giacomo Callegari
MF	ITA	Alessandro Antinori Petrini

Pos.	Nation	Player
MF	ITA	Renato Buso
MF	ITA	Antonio Dell'Oglio
MF	BRA	Dunga
MF	ITA	Giuseppe Iachini
MF	TCH	Luboš Kubík
MF	ITA	Roberto Onorati
MF	ITA	Luigi Sacchi
MF	ITA	Riccardo Secci
MF	ITA	Simone Sereni
MF	ITA	Mauro Zironelli
FW	ITA	Roberto Baggio
FW	ITA	Giacomo Banchelli
FW	ARG	Oscar Dertycia
FW	ITA	Marco Nappi

=== Transfers ===
In
Pos.	Name	from	Type
FW	Oscar Dertycia	Argentinos Juniors	-
MF	Luboš Kubík	SK Slavia Prague	-
MF	Renato Buso	Juventus FC	
FW	Marco Nappi	Genoa CFC	loan
MF	Giuseppe Volpecina	Hellas Verona	
DF	Stefano Pioli	Hellas Verona	
MF	Antonio Dell'Oglio	Ascoli	
MF	Giuseppe Iachini	Hellas Verona	

Out
Pos.	Name	To	Type
FW	Stefano Borgonovo	A.C. Milan	loan ended
DF	Glenn Hysén	Liverpool F.C.	
DF	Stefano Carobbi	AC Milan	

== Competitions ==
=== Serie A ===
==== League table ====
Pos	Team	Pld	W	D	L	GF	GA	GD	Pts
10	Bari	34	6	19	9	34	37	−3	31
11	Genoa	34	6	17	11	27	31	−4	29
12	Fiorentina	34	7	14	13	41	42	−1	28
13	Cesena	34	6	16	12	26	36	−10	28
14	Lecce	34	10	8	16	29	46	−17	28

Source: 1989–90 Serie A, RSSSF.com
Rules for classification: 1) Points; 2) Head-to-head points; 3) Head-to-head goal difference; 4) Goal difference; 5) Goals scored; 6) Draw.

==== Result by round ====
Round	1	2	3	4	5	6	7	8	9	10	11	12	13	14	15	16	17	18	19	20	21	22	23	24	25	26	27	28	29	30	31	32	33	34
Ground	A	H	A	H	A	A	H	A	H	A	H	H	A	H	A	H	A	H	A	H	A	H	H	A	H	A	H	A	A	H	A	H	A	H
Result	D	D	L	W	L	D	L	L	W	W	L	W	D	L	L	D	D	D	D	D	D	L	L	D	W	L	D	L	L	D	D	W	L	W
Position	7	6	13	9	10	11	12	14	12	11	13	10	10	12	12	12	11	12	11	11	11	11	12	13	11	13	11	13	13	13	12	11	12	12

Source: Competitive matches
A = Away; H = Home; W = Win; D = Draw; L = Loss; P = Postponed; = Leader, 1990–91 European Cup; = 1990–91 UEFA Cup

==== Matches ====
27 August 1989 1	Bari	1–1	Fiorentina	Bari
	Maiellaro 40'	Report	78' Baggio	Stadium: della Vittoria; Referee: Cornieti

3 September 1989 2	Fiorentina	0–0	Genoa	Pistoia
		Report		Stadium: Stadio Comunale; Referee: Frigerio

6 September 1989 3	Juventus	3–1	Fiorentina	Turin
	Casiraghi 25'; Schillaci 67'; Alessio 90'	Report	37' Kubík	Stadium: Stadio Comunale; Referee: Longhi

10 September 1989 4	Fiorentina	1–0	Lazio	Pistoia
	Baggio 71' (pen.)	Report		Stadium: Stadio Comunale; Referee: Magni

17 September 1989 5	Napoli	3–2	Fiorentina	Naples
	Pioli 61' (o.g.); Careca 76'; Corradini 87'	Report	22', 31' (pen.) Baggio	Stadium: Stadio San Paolo; Referee: F. Baldas

24 September 1989 6	AC Milan	1–1	Fiorentina	Milan
	Tassotti 2'	Report	66' Dell'Oglio	Stadium: San Siro; Referee: Agnolin

1 October 1989 7	Fiorentina	1–2	Udinese	Pistoia
	Buso 41'	Report	6' Balbo; 67' Battistini	Stadium: Stadio Comunale; Referee: Amendolia

8 October 1989 8	Lecce	1–0	Fiorentina	Lecce
	Virdis 15'	Report		Stadium: Stadio Via del Mare; Referee: Coppetelli

22 October 1989 9	Fiorentina	3–1	Sampdoria	Florence
	Volpecina 23'; Battistini 34'; Baggio 53'	Report	36' R. Mancini	Stadium: Stadio Comunale; Referee: Lo Bello

29 October 1989 10	Cremonese	1–2	Fiorentina	Cremona
	Chiorri 77'	Report	73' Nappi; 79' Pioli	Stadium: Stadio Giovanni Zini; Referee: Di Cola

5 November 1989 11	Fiorentina	0–1	Bologna	Florence
		Report	78' Geovani	Stadium: Stadio Comunale; Referee: F. Baldas

19 November 1989 12	Fiorentina	5–1	Ascoli	Florence
	Baggio 10', 38', 88'; Dertycia 64', 69'	Report	72' Carillo	Stadium: Stadio Comunale; Referee: Amendolia

26 November 1989 13	Cesena	1–1	Fiorentina	Cesena
	Pierleoni 11'	Report	58' Dertycia	Stadium: Stadio Dino Manuzzi; Referee: Pezzella

3 December 1989 14	Fiorentina	1–2	AS Roma	Florence
	Battistini 55'	Report	7' Desideri; 44' Rizzitelli	Stadium: Stadio Comunale; Referee: Beschin

10 December 1989 15	Hellas Verona	1–0	Fiorentina	Verona
	Magrin 89'	Report		Stadium: Stadio Marcantonio Bentegodi; Referee: Longhi

17 December 1989 16	Fiorentina	2–2	Inter Milan	Florence
	Baggio 45' (pen.); Dell'Oglio 62'	Report	50', 60' (pen.) A. Serena	Stadium: Stadio Comunale; Referee: Lanese

30 December 1989 17	Atalanta	0–0	Fiorentina	Bergamo
		Report		Stadium: Stadio Comunale; Referee: F. Baldas

7 January 1990 18	Fiorentina	2–2	Bari	Florence
	Buso 51'; Baggio 76' (pen.)	Report	67' (pen.) Perrone; 90' Fioretti	Stadium: Stadio Comunale; Referee: Sguizzato

14 January 1990 19	Genoa	1–1	Fiorentina	Genoa
	Aguilera 39'	Report	84' Dertycia	Stadium: Stadio Luigi Ferraris; Referee: Felicani

17 January 1990 20	Fiorentina	2–2	Juventus	Florence
	Baggio 63' (pen.); Battistini 72'	Report	2' Napoli; 17' Zavarov	Stadium: Stadio Comunale; Referee: Longhi

21 January 1990 21	Lazio	1–1	Fiorentina	Rome
	Roben Sosa 33'	Report	70' Kubík	Stadium: Stadio Flaminio; Referee: Cornieti

28 January 1990 22	Fiorentina	0–1	Napoli	Florence
		Report	19' Fusi	Stadium: Comunale; Referee: Rosario Lo Bello

4 February 1990 23	Fiorentina	2–3	AC Milan	Perugia
	Baggio 23' (pen.); Kubík 47'	Report	55' Evani; 60', 66' Van Basten	Stadium: Renato Curi; Referee: Carlo Longhi

11 February 1990 24	Udinese	1–1	Fiorentina	Udine
	Mattei 44'	Report	45' Buso	Stadium: Friuli; Referee: Pierluigi Magni

18 February 1990 25	Fiorentina	3–0	Lecce	Perugia
	Nappi 17'; Baggio 80' (pen.); G. Ferri 85' (o.g.)	Report		Stadium: Renato Curi; Referee: Fabio Baldas

25 February 1990 26	Sampdoria	3–0	Fiorentina	Genoa
	Vierchowod 41'; A. Lombardo 68'; Vialli 78'	Report		Stadium: Luigi Ferraris; Referee: Paolo Fabricatore

4 March 1990 27	Fiorentina	0–0	Cremonese	Arezzo
		Report		Stadium: Comunale; Referee: Angelo Amendolia

11 March 1990 28	Bologna	1–0	Fiorentina	Bologna
	Giordano 55'	Report		Stadium: Renato Dall'Ara; Referee: Coppetelli

18 March 1990 29	Ascoli	2–1	Fiorentina	Ascoli Piceno
	Cvetkovic 8'; P. Giovannelli 83'	Report	13' (pen.) Baggio	Stadium: Stadio Cino e Lillo Del Duca; Referee: Werter Cornieti

25 March 1990 30	Fiorentina	0–0	Cesena	Perugia
		Report		Stadium: Renato Curi; Referee: Paolo Fabricatore

8 April 1990 31	AS Roma	0–0	Fiorentina	Rome
		Report		Stadium: Flaminio; Referee: Lo Bello

14 April 1990 32	Fiorentina	3–1	Hellas Verona	Florence
	A. Di Chiara 36'; Baggio 49' (pen.), 89'	Report	29' D. Pellegrini	Stadium: Comunale; Referee: Fabio Baldas

22 April 1990 33	Inter Milan	2–0	Fiorentina	Milan
	Berti 23'; Bergomi 65'	Report		Stadium: Giuseppe Meazza; Referee: Sergio Coppetelli

29 April 1990 34	Fiorentina	4–1	Atalanta	Florence
	Buso 5'; A. Di Chiara 35'; Prandelli 38' (o.g.); Baggio 57'	Report	7' (pen.) Evair	Stadium: Comunale; Referee: Pierluigi Pairetto

=== Coppa Italia ===
==== Qualifying round ====
23 August 1989 1	Licata	1–3	Fiorentina	Licata
	La Rosa 73' (pen.)		16' Battistini; 39' A. Di Chiara; 64' Baggio	Stadium: Dino Liotta; Referee: Bruno Di Cola

30 August 1989 2	Fiorentina	1–1 (a.e.t.) (10-9 p)	Como 1907	Florence
	Bosco 39'		85' Turrini	Stadium: Comunale; Referee: Fabio Baldas
	Penalties
	Battistini (penalty scored); Onorati (penalty scored); Pioli (penalty scored); Volpecina (penalty scored); Baggio (penalty scored); Buso (penalty scored); Bosco (penalty scored); Iachini (penalty scored); Dertycia (penalty scored)		(penalty scored) Turrini; (penalty scored) Mazzucato; (penalty scored) Milton; (penalty scored) Mannari; (penalty scored) G. Ferazzoli; (penalty scored) Lorenzini; (penalty scored) Gattuso; (penalty scored) Biondo; (penalty missed) Annoni

==== Groups stage ====
===== Group 2 =====
Pos	Team	Pld	W	D	L	GF	GA	GD	Pts
1	Napoli	2	1	1	0	3	1	+2	3
2	Bologna	2	1	0	1	3	4	−1	2
3	Fiorentina	2	0	1	1	3	4	−1	1

3 January 1990 1	Bologna F.C.	3–2	Fiorentina	Bologna
	Geovani 30' (pen.); Waas 53'; Stringara 58'		14' Battistini; 62' Dertycia	Stadium: Dall'Ara; Referee: Pierluigi Magni

24 January 1990 3	Fiorentina	1–1	S.S.C. Napoli	Perugia
	Dunga 22'		49' Maradona	Stadium: Renato Curi; Referee: Sergio Coppetelli

=== UEFA Cup ===
==== Round of 64 ====
13 September 1989 1	Atletico Madrid (Spain)	1–0	(Italy) Fiorentina	Madrid
	Baltazar 78'			Stadium: Vicente Calderon; Referee: (West Germany) Aron Schmidhuber

27 September 1989 2	Fiorentina (Italy)	1–0 (a.e.t.) (3–1 p)	(Spain) Atletico Madrid	Perugia
	Bustingorri 25' (o.g.)			Stadium: Renato Curi; Referee: (France) Michel Vautrot
	Penalties
	Battistini (penalty scored); Pioli (penalty scored); Sereni (penalty missed); Volpecina (penalty missed); Baggio (penalty scored)		(penalty missed) Futre; (penalty missed) Marina; (penalty scored) Bustingorri; (penalty missed) Manolo

==== Round of 32 ====
18 October 1989 1	Fiorentina (Italy)	0–0	(France) FC Sochaux	Perugia
				Stadium: Renato Curi; Referee: (Hungary) Nemeth

1 November 1989 2	FC Sochaux (France)	1–1	(Italy) Fiorentina	Montbéliard
	Laurey 36'		33' Buso	Stadium: August Bonal; Referee: (Spain) Emilio Soriano Aladrén

==== Eightfinals ====
22 November 1989 1	Fiorentina (Italy)	1–0	(Soviet Union) Dinamo Kyiv	Perugia
	Baggio 78' (pen.)			Stadium: Renato Curi; Referee: (West Germany) Tritschler

6 December 1989 2	Dinamo Kyiv (Soviet Union)	0–0	(Italy) Fiorentina	Kyiv
				Stadium: Olympic; Referee: (England) Worral

==== Quarterfinals ====
7 March 1990 1	Fiorentina (Italy)	1–0	(France) AJ Auxerre	Perugia
	Volpecina 6'			Stadium: Renato Curi; Referee: (Sweden) Fredriksson

21 March 1990 2	AJ Auxerre (France)	0–1	(Italy) Fiorentina	Auxerre
			79' Nappi	Stadium: Abbé-Deschamps; Referee: (Scotland) Smith

==== Semifinals ====
3 April 1990 1	Werder Bremen (West Germany)	1–1	(Italy) Fiorentina	Bremen
	Landucci 90' (o.g.)		78' Nappi	Stadium: Weserstadion; Referee: (Denmark) Mikkelsen

17 April 1990 2	Fiorentina (Italy)	0–0	(West Germany) Werder Bremen	Perugia
				Stadium: Renato Curi; Referee: (France) Biguet

==== Finals ====
2 May 1990 1	Juventus (Italy)	3–1	(Italy) Fiorentina	Turin
	Galia 3'; Casiraghi 59'; De Agostini 73'		10' Buso	Stadium: Comunale; Attendance: 60 000; Referee: (Spain) Emilio Soriano Aladrén

16 May 1990 2	Fiorentina (Italy)	0–0	(Italy) Juventus	Avellino
				Stadium: Partenio; Attendance: 40 000; Referee: (West Germany) Aron Schmidhuber

== Statistics ==
=== Players statistics ===
No.	Pos	Nat	Player	Total		Serie A		Coppa Italia		UEFA Cup	
No.	Pos	Nat	Player	Apps	Goals	Apps	Goals	Apps	Goals	Apps	Goals
	GK	(Italy) ITA	Landucci	50	-54	34	-42	4	-6	12	-6
	DF	(Italy) ITA	Battistini	46	5	30	3	4	2	12	0
	DF	(Italy) ITA	Volpecina	42	2	30	1	2	0	10	1
	DF	(Italy) ITA	Pin	42	0	24+4	0	3	0	11	0
	DF	(Italy) ITA	Pioli	39	1	26	1	3	0	10	0
	MF	(Italy) ITA	Buso	41	7	22+7	4	3	0	9	3
	MF	(Brazil) BRA	Dunga	41	1	28	0	2	1	11	0
	MF	(Italy) ITA	Dell'Oglio	35	2	21+6	2	2	0	6	0
	MF	(Czechoslovakia) TCH	Kubík	40	3	20+6	3	4	0	10	0
	FW	(Italy) ITA	Baggio	46	19	32	17	2	1	12	1
	FW	(Italy) ITA	Nappi	27	4	18+2	2	1	0	6	2
	GK	(Italy) ITA	Pellicano	0	0	0	0	0	-0	0	-0
	MF	(Italy) ITA	Iachini	34	0	22+1	0	4	0	7	0
	DF	(Italy) ITA	Di Chiara	32	3	19+2	2	3	1	8	0
	DF	(Italy) ITA	Faccenda	26	0	17+3	0	2	0	4	0
	FW	(Argentina) ARG	Dertycia	28	5	17+2	4	3	1	6	0
	DF	(Italy) ITA	Malusci	16	0	7+4	0	1	0	4	0
	DF	(Italy) ITA	Antonaccio	0	0	0	0				
	DF	(Italy) ITA	Bosco	7	1	4	0	2	1	1	0
	DF	(Italy) ITA	Daniel	4	0	1+1	0	1	0	1	0
	MF	(Italy) ITA	Sacchi	3	0	1+1	0	1	0	0	0
	MF	(Italy) ITA	Antinori	2	0	1	0	0	0	1	0
	MF	(Italy) ITA	Zironelli	9	0	0+6	0	0	0	3	0
	FW	(Italy) ITA	Banchelli	6	0	0+6	0	0	0	0	0
	MF	(Italy) ITA	Sereni	4	0	0+2	0	1	0	1	0
	MF	(Italy) ITA	Callegari	5	0	0+3	0	0	0	2	0
	MF	(Italy) ITA	Onorati	2	0	0	0	2	0	0	0
	MF	(Italy) ITA	Secci	0	0	0	0				
	DF	(Italy) ITA	A. Basciu	1	0	0	0	1	0	0	0
	DF	(Italy) ITA	R. Del Lama	2	0	0	0	1	0	1	0
