= 1988–89 AC Fiorentina season =

Fiorentina
1988–89 season
- Chairman: Lorenzo Righetti
- Manager: Sven-Göran Eriksson
- Stadium: Comunale
- Serie A: 7th (In 1989-90 UEFA Cup)
- Coppa Italia: Quarter-finals
- Top goalscorer: League: Roberto Baggio (15); All: Roberto Baggio (24)
Home colours	Away colours

A.C. Fiorentina finished in the midfield of Serie A, beating Roma 1-0 in a playoff match due to a goal by ex-Roma player Roberto Pruzzo. The season also marked the international breakthrough of Roberto Baggio, the striker scoring 15 league goals, also setting up several of Stefano Borgonovo's 14.

== Squad ==
Note: Flags indicate national team as defined under FIFA eligibility rules; some limited exceptions apply. Players may hold more than one non-FIFA nationality.

Pos.	Nation	Player
GK	ITA	Giuseppe Pellicanò
GK	ITA	Marco Landucci
GK	ITA	Marco Bacchin
DF	ITA	Stefano Carobbi
DF	ITA	Giuseppe Antonaccio
DF	SWE	Glenn Hysén
DF	ITA	Ernesto Calisti
DF	ITA	Celeste Pin
DF	ITA	Massimo Paganin
MF	BRA	Dunga
MF	ITA	Sergio Battistini
MF	ITA	Massimiliano Dal Compare
MF	ITA	Luigi Galli

Pos.	Nation	Player
MF	ITA	Giuseppe Centrone
MF	ITA	Roberto Bosco
MF	ITA	Paolo Perugi
MF	ITA	Luca Mattei
MF	ITA	Roberto Gelsi
MF	ITA	Alberto Di Chiara
MF	ITA	Stefano Salvatori
MF	ITA	Paolo Ciucchi
FW	ITA	Roberto Baggio
FW	ITA	Stefano Borgonovo
FW	ITA	Fabio Graccaneli
FW	ITA	Davide Pellegrini
FW	ITA	Roberto Pruzzo
FW	ITA	Enrico Cucchi
FW	URU	Diego Aguirre

=== Transfers ===
In
Pos.	Name	from	Type
FW	Stefano Borgonovo	AC Milan	loan
MF	Luca Mattei	Como	-
MF	Dunga	Pisa	-
FW	Roberto Pruzzo	AS Roma	-
GK	Giuseppe Pellicanò	AS Bari	-
MF	Stefano Salvatori	Parma	-
FW	Diego Aguirre	Olympiakos	

Out
Pos.	Name	To	Type
FW	Ramón Díaz	Internazionale	
MF	Nicola Berti	Internazionale	
DF	Renzo Contratto	Atalanta BC	
MF	Simone Sereni	Trento	
MF	Roberto Onorati	Genoa CFC	
FW	Diego Aguirre	Central Español	

== Competitions ==
=== Serie A ===
==== League table ====
Pos	Team	Pld	W	D	L	GF	GA	GD	Pts	Qualification or relegation
5	Sampdoria	34	14	11	9	43	25	+18	39	Qualification to Cup Winners' Cup
6	Atalanta	34	11	14	9	37	32	+5	36	Qualification to UEFA Cup
7	Fiorentina (Note: AC Fiorentina won the UEFA Cup qualification match against AS Roma then qualified to 1989–90 UEFA Cup.)	34	12	10	12	44	43	+1	34	Qualification to UEFA Cup
8	Roma	34	11	12	11	33	40	−7	34	
9	Lecce	34	8	15	11	25	35	−10	31	

Source: 1988–89 Serie A, RSSSF.com
Rules for classification: 1) Points; 2) Head-to-head points; 3) Head-to-head goal difference; 4) Goal difference; 5) Goals scored; 6) Draw.

==== Result by round ====
Round	1	2	3	4	5	6	7	8	9	10	11	12	13	14	15	16	17	18	19	20	21	22	23	24	25	26	27	28	29	30	31	32	33	34
Ground	A	H	A	H	H	A	H	A	H	A	A	H	H	A	H	A	H	H	A	H	A	A	H	A	H	A	H	H	A	A	H	A	H	A
Result	L	W	W	W	D	D	L	L	W	L	L	W	W	D	D	L	W	L	D	W	L	W	W	W	L	D	W	D	L	D	D	L	D	L
Position	12	7	4	3	3	4	5	8	7	8	8	7	7	7	7	8	7	7	7	7	7	7	6	6	7	7	7	7	7	7	7	7	7	7

Source: Competitive matches
A = Away; H = Home; W = Win; D = Draw; L = Loss; P = Postponed; = Leader, 1989–90 European Cup; = 1989–90 UEFA Cup

==== Matches ====
9 October 1988 1	Milan	4–0	Fiorentina	Milan
	Donadoni 14'; Virdis 78', 85', 89' (pen.)	Report		Stadium: Stadio San Siro; Attendance: 72,414; Referee: Arcangelo Pezzella

16 October 1988 2	Fiorentina	2–1	Ascoli	Florence
	Borgonovo 6'; R. Baggio 18'	Report	Battistini 73' (o.g.)	Stadium: Stadio Comunale; Attendance: 14,994; Referee: Moreno Frigerio

23 October 1988 3	Cesena	0–3	Fiorentina	Cesena
		Report	Piraccini 20' (o.g.); R. Baggio 32'; Borgonovo 70'	Stadium: Stadio Dino Manuzzi; Attendance: 15,914; Referee: Pierluigi Magni

30 October 1988 4	Fiorentina	2–1	Torino	Florence
	D. Pellegrini 42'; R. Baggio 83' (pen.)	Report	Müller 68'; Comi (red card) 87'	Stadium: Stadio Comunale; Attendance: 15,692; Referee: Carlo Longhi

6 November 1988 5	Fiorentina	1–1	Atalanta	Florence
	Borgonovo 50'	Report	Bonacina 6'	Stadium: Stadio Comunale; Attendance: 17,611; Referee: Mauro Felicani

20 November 1988 6	Pisa	0–0	Fiorentina	Pisa
		Report		Stadium: Arena Garibaldi; Attendance: 15,706; Referee: Rosario Lo Bello

27 November 1988 7	Fiorentina	0–2	Sampdoria	Florence
		Report	Vialli (penalty missed) 40', 90'; Dossena 58'	Stadium: Stadio Comunale; Attendance: 37,504; Referee: Pietro D'Elia

4 December 1988 8	Napoli	2–0	Fiorentina	Naples
	Maradona 30' (pen.); Careca 76'; Carnevale (red card) 82'	Report	Pin (red card) 82'	Stadium: Stadio San Paolo; Attendance: 54,122; Referee: Pierluigi Pairetto

11 December 1988 9	Fiorentina	3–2	Pescara	Florence
	D. Pellegrini 36'; R. Baggio 43' (pen.), 87'	Report	Edmar 33'; Júnior 45'	Stadium: Stadio Comunale; Attendance: 22,739; Referee: Sergio Coppetelli

18 December 1988 10	Como	3–2	Fiorentina	Como
	Pin 40' (o.g.); Simone 46'; Invernizzi 80'	Report	Battistini 6'; Cucchi 86'	Stadium: Stadio Giuseppe Sinigaglia; Attendance: 7,900; Referee: Paolo Fabricatore

31 December 1988 11	Verona	2–1	Fiorentina	Verona
	Bortolazzi 60' (pen.), 78' (pen.); Soldà (red card) 84'	Report	R. Baggio 39' (pen.); Salvatori (red card) 81'	Stadium: Stadio Marc'Antonio Bentegodi; Attendance: 21,027; Referee: Mauro Felicani

8 January 1989 12	Fiorentina	3–0	Lazio	Florence
	Borgonovo 18'; Salvatori 57'; R. Baggio 87'	Report		Stadium: Stadio Comunale; Attendance: 20,400; Referee: Pierluigi Magni

15 January 1989 13	Fiorentina	2–1	Juventus	Florence
	R. Baggio 39' (pen.); Borgonovo 89'	Report	Rui Barros 33'	Stadium: Stadio Comunale; Attendance: 37,504; Referee: Arcangelo Pezzella

22 January 1989 14	Lecce	0–0	Fiorentina	Lecce
		Report	Carobbi (red card) 69'	Stadium: Stadio Via del Mare; Referee: Bruno Di Cola

29 January 1989 15	Fiorentina	2–2	Roma	Florence
	Borgonovo 41', 72'; Battistini (red card) 75'	Report	Massaro 3'; Conti 30'	Stadium: Stadio Comunale; Referee: Rosario Lo Bello

5 February 1989 16	Bologna	1–0	Fiorentina	Bologna
	Monza 42'; Marronaro (penalty missed) 90'	Report		Stadium: Stadio Renato Dall'Ara; Referee: Carlo Longhi

12 February 1989 17	Fiorentina	4–3	Internazionale	Florence
	R. Baggio 33'; Cucchi 52'; Borgonovo 72', 85'	Report	Matthäus 13' (pen.); Serena 55', 57'	Stadium: Stadio Comunale; Referee: Luigi Agnolin

19 February 1989 18	Fiorentina	0–2	Milan	Florence
		Report	Colombo 45'; Ancelotti 78' van Basten (red card) 81'	Stadium: Stadio Comunale; Referee: Arcangelo Pezzella

26 February 1989 19	Ascoli	1–1	Fiorentina	Ascoli Piceno
	Giordano 16'	Report	Borgonovo 20'	Stadium: Stadio Cino e Lillo Del Duca; Referee: Mauro Felicani

5 March 1989 20	Fiorentina	4–1	Cesena	Florence
	R. Baggio 54', 89' (pen.); Dunga 71'; Borgonovo 84'	Report	Limido 33'	Stadium: Stadio Comunale; Referee: Sergio Coppetelli

12 March 1989 21	Torino	1–0	Fiorentina	Turin
	Skoro 66'	Report		Stadium: Stadio Comunale; Referee: Arcangelo Pezzella

19 March 1989 22	Atalanta	0–1	Fiorentina	Bergamo
	Nicolini (penalty missed) 77'	Report	R. Baggio 29', (red card) 65'	Stadium: Stadio Comunale; Referee: Paolo Fabricatore

2 April 1989 23	Fiorentina	3–0	Pisa	Florence
	Cucchi (penalty missed) 7'; Di Chiara 24'; Borgonovo 31'; Dunga 45'	Report		Stadium: Stadio Comunale; Referee: Pierluigi Magni

9 April 1989 24	Sampdoria	1–2	Fiorentina	Genoa
	Vierchowod (red card) 80'; Dossena 85'	Report	D. Pellegrini 19'; Borgonovo 79'	Stadium: Stadio Luigi Ferraris; Referee: Mauro Felicani

16 April 1989 25	Fiorentina	1–3	Napoli	Florence
	D. Pellegrini 45'	Report	Careca 25'; Carnevale 53', 70'	Stadium: Stadio Comunale; Referee: Rosario Lo Bello

30 April 1989 26	Pescara	0–0	Fiorentina	Pescara
		Report		Stadium: Adriatico; Referee: Fabio Baldas

7 May 1989 27	Fiorentina	3–1	Como	Florence
	Baggio 5'; Baggio 78' (pen.); Dunga 86'	Report	Simone 89'	Stadium: Comunale; Referee: Arcangelo Pezzella

14 May 1989 28	Fiorentina	1–1	Hellas Verona	Florence
	Baggio 48'	Report	Berthold 8'	Stadium: Comunale; Referee: Paolo Fabricatore

21 May 1989 29	Lazio	1–0	Fiorentina	Rome
	Sosa 57' (pen.)	Report		Stadium: Olimpico; Referee: Moreno Frigerio

28 May 1989 30	Juventus	1–1	Fiorentina	Turin
	Buso 4'	Report	Cucchi 53'	Stadium: Comunale

4 June 1989 31	Fiorentina	1–1	Lecce	Florence
	Cucchi 36'	Report	Barbas 27'	Stadium: Comunale; Referee: Pierluigi Magni

11 June 1989 32	Roma	2–1	Fiorentina	Rome
	Giannini 36'; Völler 87'	Report	Borgonovo 33'	Stadium: Olimpico; Referee: Moreno Frigerio

18 June 1989 33	Fiorentina	0–0	Bologna	Florence
	Carobbi (red card) 65'	Report		Stadium: Comunale; Referee: Angelo Amendiola

25 June 1989 34	Internazionale	2–0	Fiorentina	Milan
	Diaz 61'; Bianchi 76'	Report		Stadium: Giuseppe Meazza; Referee: Werter Cornieti

==== UEFA Cup qualification ====
30 June 1989	Fiorentina	1–0	Roma	Perugia
	Pruzzo 11'			Stadium: Stadio Renato Curi; Referee: Arcangelo Pezzella (Frattamaggiore)

Fiorentina qualified for 1989–90 UEFA Cup.

=== Coppa Italia ===
==== First round ====
Group 6
Pos	Team	Pld	W	D	L	GF	GA	GD	Pts
1	Pisa	5	2	3	0	9	6	+3	7
2	Fiorentina	5	3	1	1	7	4	+3	7
3	Ancona	5	2	1	2	4	3	+1	5
4	Genoa	5	1	3	1	4	4	0	5
5	Virtus Bergamo	5	1	2	2	5	8	−3	4
6	Avellino	5	0	2	3	2	6	−4	2

==== Results ====
21 August 1988 1	Genoa	0–0	Fiorentina	Alessandria
				Stadium: Stadio Giuseppe Moccagatta; Referee: Fabio Baldas

24 August 1988 2	Fiorentina	1–0	Avellino	Pistoia
	R. Baggio 12'			Stadium: Stadio Marcello Melani; Referee: Angelo Amendolia

28 August 1988 3	Pisa	4–2	Fiorentina	Pisa
	Been 7'; Piovanelli 30'; Severeyns 37', 77'		R. Baggio 66'; Dunga 90'	Stadium: Arena Garibaldi; Referee: Werter Cornieti

30 August 1988 4	Fiorentina	3–0	Virescit Boccaleone	Pistoia
	R. Baggio 4' (pen.), 83'; Aguirre 54'			Stadium: Stadio Marcello Melani; Referee: Alessandro Guidi

3 September 1988 5	Ancona	0–1	Fiorentina	Ancona
			R. Baggio 51' (pen.)	Stadium: Stadio del Conero; Referee: Luigi Agnolin

==== Second round ====
Group E
Pos	Team	Pld	W	D	L	GF	GA	GD	Pts
1	Lazio	3	2	1	0	3	1	+2	5
2	Fiorentina	3	2	0	1	7	4	+3	4
3	Internazionale	3	0	2	1	5	6	−1	2
4	Udinese	3	0	1	2	1	5	−4	1

==== Results ====
14 September 1988 1	Lazio	1–0	Fiorentina	Rome
	Dezotti 20'			Stadium: Stadio Olimpico; Referee: Pierluigi Pairetto

21 September 1988 2	Fiorentina	3–0	Udinese	Pistoia
	R. Baggio 50', 89' (pen.); Borgonovo 84'			Stadium: Stadio Marcello Melani; Referee: Alessandro Guidi

28 September 1988 3	Internazionale	3–4	Fiorentina	Piacenza
	Mathäus 20' (pen.), 83'; Morello 68'		Borgonovo 28'; R. Baggio 29', 52' (pen.); Mattei 67'	Stadium: Stadio Galleana; Referee: Fabio Baldas

==== Quarter-finals ====
4 January 1989 First leg	Sampdoria	3–0	Fiorentina	Genoa
	R. Mancini 14'; Cerezo 25'; Vialli 80'			Stadium: Stadio Luigi Ferraris; Referee: Tullio Lanese

25 January 1989 Second leg	Fiorentina	1–1	Sampdoria	Florence
	L. Pellegrini 7' (o.g.)		L. Pellegrini 70'	Stadium: Stadio Comunale; Referee: Moreno Frigerio

== Statistics ==
=== Players statistics ===
No.	Pos	Nat	Player	Total		Serie A		Coppa Italia	
No.	Pos	Nat	Player	Apps	Goals	Apps	Goals	Apps	Goals
	GK	(Italy) ITA	Landucci	35	-47	24+1	-35	10	-12
	DF	(Italy) ITA	Carobbi	37	0	30	0	7	0
	DF	(Sweden) SWE	Hysen	40	0	31	0	9	0
	DF	(Italy) ITA	Battistini	34	1	28	1	6	0
	DF	(Italy) ITA	Di Chiara	41	1	24+7	1	10	0
	MF	(Italy) ITA	Bosco	30	0	25	0	5	0
	MF	(Brazil) BRA	Dunga	38	4	30	3	8	1
	MF	(Italy) ITA	Cucchi	42	4	32	4	10	0
	MF	(Italy) ITA	Mattei	36	1	22+6	0	8	1
	FW	(Italy) ITA	Baggio	40	24	30	15	10	9
	FW	(Italy) ITA	Borgonovo	35	16	30	14	5	2
	GK	(Italy) ITA	Pellicano	11	-8	10+1	-8	0	0
	MF	(Italy) ITA	Salvatori	25	1	22+1	1	2	0
	FW	(Italy) ITA	D. Pellegrini	36	4	17+12	4	7	0
	DF	(Italy) ITA	Pin	24	0	12+6	0	6	0
	DF	(Italy) ITA	Calisti	18	0	5+5	0	8	0
	FW	(Italy) ITA	Pruzzo	15	0	1+12	0	2	0
	MF	(Italy) ITA	Perugi	9	0	1+2	0	6	0
	MF	(Italy) ITA	Gelsi	4	0	0+1	0	3	0
	GK	(Italy) ITA	Bacchin	0	0	0	0		
	MF	(Italy) ITA	Dal Compare	0	0	0	0		
	MF	(Italy) ITA	Galli	0	0	0	0		
	MF	(Italy) ITA	Centrone	0	0	0	0		
	FW	(Uruguay) URU	Diego Aguirre	4	1	0	0	4	1

- Source: http://calcio-seriea.net/presenze/1988/969/
