= Ramón Benítez =

Argentine footballer

Personal information
- Full name: Ramón Arsenio Benítez
- Date of birth: June 15, 1960 (age 66)
- Place of birth: San Martín, Buenos Aires, Argentina
- Height: 1.72 m (5 ft 8 in)
- Position: Central midfielder

Senior career*
Years	Team	Apps	(Gls)
1981	Gimnasia y Tiro	13	(0)
1982	Central Norte	15	(0)
1982–1983	Racing de Córdoba	26	(4)
1983–1988	Instituto	201	(13)
1989–1992	Junior	96	(7)
1992	Racing de Córdoba	24	(5)
1992–1995	Blooming	100	(8)
1995–1997	Talleres	41	(2)
- Instituto
- * Club domestic league appearances and goals

Ramón Arsenio Benítez (born June 15, 1960, in San Martín, Buenos Aires) is a former Argentine football midfielder who played at club level in Argentina and Bolivia during the 1980s and 90's.

Benítez made his professional debut in 1981 for Gimnasia y Tiro de Salta. The following year he joined Central Norte, but shortly after he moved to Racing de Córdoba. His good form bought him a transfer to Instituto de Córdoba in 1983. During the mid 80's Benítez formed an impressive offensive partnership with Oscar Dertycia, Osvaldo Márquez and Enrique Nieto. He played at Instituto until 1988 making over 200 flight top appearances for the club. In 1988, he was transferred to Junior de Barranquilla, en Colombia. In 1989, he returned to Racing de Córdoba, and in 1990 the club suffered its relegation to the Argentine second division. Benítez played for Racing until 1992. Subsequently, he had a brief spell in the Liga de Fútbol Profesional Boliviano with Club Blooming. Later that year, he was signed by Talleres de Córdoba. Between 1992 and 1995 he played in 66 games and scored 5 goals in the Argentine Primera. The team was relegated but, gained promotion to the Primera with Talleres in the 1993–94 season. In 1995 Benítez transferred to Instituto, where he once played the best football of his career. In 1997 after 41 appearances and 2 goals scored for Instituto, he decided to retire from the sport at age 37.
