= 1990 UEFA Cup final =

- Event: 1989–90 UEFA Cup
Juventus	Fiorentina
(Italy)	(Italy)
3	1
- on aggregate

First leg
Juventus	Fiorentina
3	1
- Date: 2 May 1990
- Venue: Stadio Comunale Vittorio Pozzo, Turin
- Referee: Emilio Soriano Aladrén (Spain)
- Attendance: 45,000

Second leg
Fiorentina	Juventus
0	0
- Date: 16 May 1990
- Venue: Stadio Partenio, Avellino
- Referee: Aron Schmidhuber (West Germany)
- Attendance: 32,000

The 1990 UEFA Cup Final was an association football tie played on 2 May 1990 and 16 May 1990 between Juventus and Fiorentina of Italy. Juventus won 3–1 on aggregate. This was the first final between two Italian sides in the UEFA competitions' history and the third between two clubs of the same country.

The first game was the last official football game played at the Stadio Comunale until 2006, when Stadio delle Alpi was closed.

The second game was played in Avellino because Fiorentina's substitute stadium in Perugia was closed after the incidents in the semifinal game against SV Werder Bremen.

With this defeat, Fiorentina became the second club – after Hamburger SV – to have been runner-up in all three major European competitions (European Champion Clubs' Cup/UEFA Champions League, UEFA Cup/UEFA Europa League, and the now-defunct Cup Winners' Cup).

== Route to the final ==
Juventus				Round	Fiorentina			
Opponent	Agg.	1st leg	2nd leg		Opponent	Agg.	1st leg	2nd leg
(Poland) Górnik Zabrze	5–2	1–0 (A)	4–2 (H)	First round	(Spain) Atlético Madrid	1–1 (p)	0–1 (A)	1–0 (a.e.t.) (H)
(France) Paris Saint-Germain	3–1	1–0 (A)	2–1 (H)	Second round	(France) Sochaux	1–1 (a)	0–0 (H)	1–1 (A)
(East Germany) Karl-Marx-Stadt (Note: renamed to Chemnitzer FC later that year following German reunification.)	3–1	2–1 (H)	1–0 (A)	Third round	(Soviet Union) Dynamo Kyiv	1–0	1–0 (H)	0–0 (A)
(West Germany) Hamburger SV	3–2	2–0 (A)	1–2 (H)	Quarter-finals	(France) Auxerre	2–0	1–0 (H)	1–0 (A)
(West Germany) 1. FC Köln	3–2	3–2 (H)	0–0 (A)	Semi-finals	(West Germany) Werder Bremen	1–1 (a)	1–1 (A)	0–0 (H)

== Match details ==
=== First leg ===
2 May 1990

Juventus (Italy)	3–1	(Italy) Fiorentina
Galia 3'; Casiraghi 59'; De Agostini 73'	Report	Buso 10'

Stadio Comunale Vittorio Pozzo, Turin, Italy
Attendance: 45,000
Referee: Emilio Soriano Aladrén (Spain)

Juventus	Fiorentina

GK	1	(Italy) Stefano Tacconi	(yellow card) 87'
DF	2	(Italy) Nicolò Napoli
DF	3	(Italy) Luigi De Agostini
DF	6	(Italy) Dario Bonetti	(yellow card) 85'
DF	5	(Italy) Sergio Brio (c)		(substituted off) 46'
MF	4	(Italy) Roberto Galia
MF	7	(Soviet Union) Sergei Aleinikov
MF	10	(Italy) Giancarlo Marocchi
MF	8	(Portugal) Rui Barros
FW	11	(Italy) Salvatore Schillaci
FW	9	(Italy) Pierluigi Casiraghi
Substitutes:
GK	12	(Italy) Adriano Bonaiuti
DF	13	(Italy) Massimiliano Rosa
MF	14	(Italy) Angelo Alessio		(substituted on) 46'
MF	15	(Italy) Salvatore Avallone
MF	16	(Soviet Union) Oleksandr Zavarov
Manager:
(Italy) Dino Zoff

GK	1	(Italy) Marco Landucci
DF	2	(Italy) Antonio Dell'Oglio
DF	6	(Italy) Sergio Battistini (c)
DF	4	(Italy) Giuseppe Volpecina
DF	3	(Italy) Alberto Di Chiara
MF	8	(Brazil) Dunga
MF	7	(Czechoslovakia) Luboš Kubík		(substituted off) 46'
MF	5	(Italy) Celeste Pin
MF	11	(Italy) Renato Buso
FW	10	(Italy) Roberto Baggio
FW	9	(Italy) Marco Nappi	(yellow card) 78'
Substitutes:
GK	12	(Italy) Giuseppe Pellicanò
DF	16	(Italy) Alberto Malusci		(substituted on) 46'
MF	14	(Italy) Giuseppe Iachini
MF	13	(Italy) Giacomo Callegari
FW	15	(Italy) Giacomo Banchelli
Manager:
(Italy) Francesco Graziani

=== Second leg ===
16 May 1990

Fiorentina (Italy)	0–0	(Italy) Juventus
	Report

Stadio Partenio, Avellino, Italy
Attendance: 32,000
Referee: Aron Schmidhuber (West Germany)

Fiorentina	Juventus

GK	1	(Italy) Marco Landucci
DF	11	(Italy) Antonio Dell'Oglio	(yellow card) 27'
DF	5	(Italy) Sergio Battistini (c)
DF	2	(Italy) Giuseppe Volpecina
DF	3	(Italy) Alberto Di Chiara	(yellow card) 84'
MF	6	(Brazil) Dunga
MF	7	(Czechoslovakia) Luboš Kubík
MF	4	(Italy) Celeste Pin
MF	8	(Italy) Renato Buso	(yellow card) 72'
FW	10	(Italy) Roberto Baggio
FW	9	(Italy) Marco Nappi	(yellow card) 52'	(substituted off) 72'
Substitutes:
GK	12	(Italy) Giuseppe Pellicanò
DF	16	(Italy) Alberto Malusci
MF	14	(Italy) Giuseppe Iachini
MF	13	(Italy) Giacomo Callegari
MF	15	(Italy) Mauro Zironelli		(substituted on) 72'
Manager:
(Italy) Francesco Graziani

GK	1	(Italy) Stefano Tacconi (c)
DF	2	(Italy) Nicolò Napoli
DF	3	(Italy) Luigi De Agostini
DF	4	(Italy) Roberto Galia
DF	5	(Italy) Pasquale Bruno	(yellow card) 41' (yellow-red card) 63'
MF	6	(Italy) Angelo Alessio
MF	7	(Soviet Union) Sergei Aleinikov	(yellow card) 55'
MF	8	(Portugal) Rui Barros		(substituted off) 72'
FW	9	(Italy) Pierluigi Casiraghi		(substituted off) 78'
MF	10	(Italy) Giancarlo Marocchi
FW	11	(Italy) Salvatore Schillaci
Substitutes:
GK	12	(Italy) Adriano Bonaiuti
DF	13	(Italy) Sergio Brio
DF	14	(Italy) Massimiliano Rosa		(substituted on) 78'
MF	15	(Italy) Salvatore Avallone		(substituted on) 72'
MF	16	(Soviet Union) Oleksandr Zavarov
Manager:
(Italy) Dino Zoff

== See also ==
- 1990 European Cup final
- 1990 European Cup Winners' Cup final
- ACF Fiorentina in European football
- Juventus F.C. in European football
- Italian football clubs in international competitions
- ACF Fiorentina–Juventus FC rivalry
- 1989–90 Juventus FC season
