= 2013 Guangzhou R&F F.C. season =

Guangzhou R&F 2013
- Manager: Sérgio Farias (to May 20); Li Bing (interim); Sven-Göran Eriksson (from June 4)
- Stadium: Yuexiushan Stadium
- Super League: 6th
- FA Cup: 4th Round
- Average home league attendance: 10,384

The 2013 Guangzhou R&F season is the 3rd year in Guangzhou R&F's existence and its 3rd season in the Chinese football league, also its 2nd season in the top flight.
