= Massimiliano Rosa =

Italian footballer

Personal information
- Date of birth: 12 October 1970 (age 56)
- Place of birth: Venice, Italy
- Height: 1.85 m (6 ft 1 in)
- Position: Defender

Senior career*
Years	Team	Apps	(Gls)
1987–1988	Venezia	1	(0)
1988–1989	Campobasso	31	(0)
1989	Venezia	5	(0)
1989–1990	Juventus	0	(0)
1990	Cagliari	0	(0)
1990–1996	Padova	149	(2)
1996–1997	Salernitana	29	(0)
1997–2000	Padova	53	(2)
2000–2002	SPAL	28	(1)
- * Club domestic league appearances and goals

Massimiliano Rosa (born 12 October 1970 in Venice) is a retired Italian professional footballer who played as a defender.

== Honours ==
Juventus

- Coppa Italia winner: 1989–90.
- UEFA Cup winner: 1989–90 (he played in the 1990 UEFA Cup Final even though he did not play any Serie A games until the 1994–95 season).
