= Marco Nappi =

Italian footballer (born 1966)

Personal information
- Date of birth: 13 May 1966 (age 60)
- Place of birth: Rome, Italy
- Height: 1.73 m (5 ft 8 in)
- Position: Striker

Senior career*
Years	Team	Apps	(Gls)
1983–1986	Cesena	0	(0)
1984–1986	→ Ravenna (loan)	58	(17)
1986–1987	Vis Pesaro	30	(14)
1987–1988	Arezzo	36	(8)
1988–1999	Genoa	189	(44)
1989	→ Brescia (loan)	8	(1)
1989–1991	→ Fiorentina (loan)	44	(6)
1991–1992	→ Udinese (loan)	35	(9)
1992–1993	→ SPAL (loan)	26	(10)
1995	→ Brescia (loan)	11	(0)
1999–2001	Atalanta	48	(4)
2001	Ternana	9	(2)
2002	Como	7	(1)
2002–2003	Savona	22	(3)
2003–2004	Carrarese	37	(9)
2005	Cuneo	13	(0)
2005–2006	Sestri Levante	27	(6)
Total		600	(134)

Managerial career
- 2007–2012: ASD Figenpa (youth)
- 2012–2014: Savona (youth)
- 2014–2015: Montalto Uffugo
- 2016–2017: Livorno (youth)
- 2017: Pomigliano
- 2018: Pomigliano
- 2021–2023: Arzachena
- 2023–2024: Nocerina
- 2024–2025: Cairese
- * Club domestic league appearances and goals

Marco Nappi (born 13 May 1966), also known as Nippo, is an Italian former professional footballer and current manager, who played as a striker.

== Playing career ==
Nappi was born in Rome. After signing with Urbe Tevere in 1982, he went on to play for several other Italian clubs, starting his professional footballing career with A.C. Cesena in 1983, remaining with the club until 1986, also spending two seasons on loan with Ravenna (1984–85, and 1985–86). He moved to Arezzo for a season in 1987, before moving to Genoa in 1988. During his time with Genoa (1988–99), he notably won the 1988–89 Serie B title, helping the club to obtain Serie A promotion, and also winning the 1995–96 Anglo-Italian Cup; he was also sent on loan to various clubs during his time with Genoa: Brescia (1989 and 1994–95), Fiorentina (1989–91), Udinese (1991–92), and SPAL (1992–93). He ended his career in 2006, after a season with U.S.D. Sestri Levante 1919. During his time with Fiorentina, he played alongside Roberto Baggio and also Stefano Borgonovo, helping the club to reach the 1990 UEFA Cup Final, where they were defeated by rivals Juventus. Following his retirement, he worked as a coach.

== Style of play ==
A quick, mobile, and creative forward, with an eye for goal, Nappi was known for his long blond hair, as well as his determination and work-rate on the pitch, and was capable of playing in several offensive positions. A skilful player, he was also known for his control, agility, flair and technical ability, as well as his notable use of tricks and feints to beat opponents when dribbling, such as the sombrero; one of his most famous gestures was his use of the seal dribble, which earned him the nickname foca (seal). His most famous use of the seal dribble came in the second leg of the semi-final of the 1989–90 UEFA Cup, against Werder Bremen; during the match, Nappi picked up the ball in his area and ran 20 metres with the ball bouncing along his forehead along the right flank.

== After retirement ==
Nappi served as a pundit for Telenord following his retirement. A good friend of former footballer and ex-Fiorentina team-mate Stefano Borgonovo, Nappi organized the Genoa–Sampdoria derby "United against ALS" in his honour on 27 March 2009, at the Luigi Ferraris stadium in Genoa, scoring from a penalty.

== Coaching career ==
In 2007, Nappi began a career as a youth coach for Figenpa, a Genoan amateur side. In the summer of 2012, he returned to his former club Savona (with whom he had played from 2002 to 2003) as a coach for the "Allievi Nazionali" youth side, reaching the "finali nazionali" with the youth side. In July 2014, he worked as a coach for Serie D side Comprensorio Montalto, although he resigned from this position at the beginning of 2015.

He successively served as the head coach of Serie D club Pomigliano.

In 2021, after a two-year stint as a youth coach for Chinese club Beijing Sport University F.C., he was appointed head coach of Serie D club Arzachena. After two seasons with the Sardinian club, Nappi returned to management in October 2023 as the new head coach of Serie D club Nocerina.

After leaving Nocerina by the end of the season, Nappi served as head coach of Ligurian Serie D club Cairese from October 2024 to March 2025.

== Honours ==
Genoa

- Serie B: 1988–89
- Anglo-Italian Cup: 1995–96

Como

- Serie B: 2001–02

Vis Pesaro

- Serie C2: 1986–87

Ravenna

- Serie D: 1984–85
