= Oscar Dertycia =

Argentine footballer

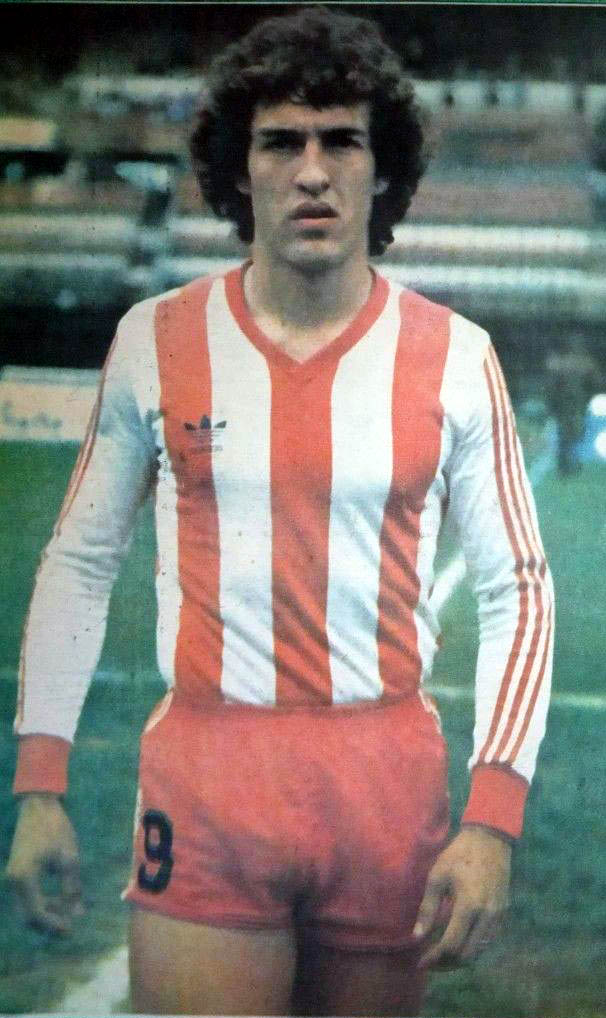
- Dertycia in 1987

Personal information
- Full name: Oscar Alberto Dertycia Álvarez
- Date of birth: 3 March 1965 (age 61)
- Place of birth: Córdoba, Argentina
- Height: 1.83 m (6 ft 0 in)
- Position: Striker

Youth career
- Instituto Córdoba

Senior career*
Years	Team	Apps	(Gls)
1982–1988	Instituto Córdoba	195	(89)
1988–1989	Argentinos Juniors	41	(20)
1989–1990	Fiorentina	19	(4)
1990–1991	Cádiz	21	(6)
1991–1994	Tenerife	90	(27)
1994–1995	Albacete	26	(6)
1995–1996	Belgrano	0	(0)
1996–1997	Talleres	40	(19)
1997–1998	Instituto Córdoba	27	(10)
2000–2001	Temuco	10	(1)
2001	General Paz	25	(6)
2001–2002	Sport Coopsol	44	(24)
Total		534	(212)

International career
1983	Argentina U20	1	(1)
1984–1988	Argentina	19	(2)
- * Club domestic league appearances and goals

Oscar Alberto Dertycia Álvarez (born 3 March 1965) is an Argentine former footballer who played as a striker and later worked as a coach.

== Club career ==
Born in Córdoba, Córdoba Province, Dertycia started playing at professional level with hometown club Instituto de Córdoba before moving in 1985 to Argentinos Juniors. During his four-year spell, he won the Copa Libertadores and finished runner-up in the Intercontinental Cup in his first season 1985. Dertycia was also crowned the Primera División's top scorer in 1988–89, finishing with 20 goals.

In the following summer, Dertycia joined Italian club ACF Fiorentina, playing with Roberto Baggio and Dunga. After finding some form following a difficult start, a serious knee injury sustained in a clash with compatriot Diego Maradona in January 1990 ended his season early, while in his absence the team reached the final of the 1989–90 UEFA Cup. Only three foreign players were allowed to play in each match, and the club filled Dertycia's vacant slot with Marius Lăcătuș (a year later La Viola signed another Argentine with similar attributes, Gabriel Batistuta, to lead the attack to great effect).

Without prospect of another opportunity at Fiorentina, Dertycia first transferred to Spanish club Cádiz CF where he garnered a firm fanbase, being nicknamed Mister Proper due to the distinctive bald head he has worn since retirement. (his body's reaction to the stress caused by the injury in Italy combined with the demands of a young family in a new country). He moved to CD Tenerife in 1991 as a replacement for Rommel Fernández, being a useful offensive footballer for said Canary Islands club under compatriots Jorge Valdano, Diego Latorre, and Fernando Redondo. Having never been an undisputed starter, Dertycia scored 16 La Liga goals in his first two seasons combined, being intimately connected to the second of Tenerife's final defeats of Real Madrid in consecutive seasons which handed the championship to rivals FC Barcelona on both occasions.

Dertycia had one final season in the country – still in the top flight, where he went on to amass totals of 137 games and 39 goals with Albacete Balompié. He returned to his native Córdoba to play in Primera B Nacional. After short spells, including in Chile and Peru, Dertycia retired in 2002 at the age of 37. He later worked as club coach and at a children's training academy in Córdoba.

== International career ==
After appearing with the Argentine under-20 team at the 1983 FIFA World Youth Championship, scoring once to help his country reach the final, In 1984, Dertycia received his first senior call-up under Carlos Bilardo, and debuted in a friendly match against Colombia the same year. He went on to score his first goal in the same tournament that year, this time against Switzerland.

Dertycia was a member of the 1987 Copa América squad that finished the tournament in fourth place. He was named in the Argentine preliminary squad for the 1990 FIFA World Cup in Italy, but an injury while playing there at club level resulted in his name getting cut from the final tournament.

== Style of play ==
To the audience, he was known as an aggressive and physically strong player. A powerful, quick and opportunistic centre-forward known for an eye for goal, positional sense and excelling in the air. He was also known hard-working, adept at making attacking runs, and could play off of his team-mates as well as provide them with assists. These capabilities also enabled him to be deployed as a second striker throughout his career.
