= Mauro Zironelli =

Italian footballer and coach

Personal information
- Date of birth: 21 January 1970 (age 56)
- Place of birth: Thiene, Italy
- Height: 1.84 m (6 ft 0 in)
- Position: Midfielder

Team information
- Current team: Cjarlins Muzane (head coach)

Senior career*
Years	Team	Apps	(Gls)
1987–1989	Vicenza	38	(2)
1989–1990	Fiorentina	8	(0)
1990–1991	Pescara	26	(0)
1991–1992	Vicenza	14	(3)
1992–1993	Pescara	10	(0)
1993–1994	Fiorentina	21	(1)
1994–1995	Chievo	27	(1)
1995–1998	Venezia	81	(8)
1999–2000	Chievo	28	(2)
2001–2002	Modena	23	(3)
2002–2003	Thiene	21	(1)
2003–2004	Montecchio Maggiore		

Managerial career
- 2012–2013: Abano
- 2013–2015: Sacilese
- 2015–2016: Altovicentino
- 2016–2018: Mestre
- 2018: Bari
- 2018–2019: Juventus U23
- 2019: Modena
- 2020–2021: Sambenedettese
- 2021: Lecco
- 2022: Luparense
- 2022–2023: Luparense
- 2023–2024: San Marzano
- 2024–: Cjarlins Muzane
- * Club domestic league appearances and goals

Mauro Zironelli (born 21 January 1970) is an Italian professional football coach and a former player who played as a midfielder. He is the head coach of Serie D club Cjarlins Muzane.

== Playing career ==
Zironelli started playing professionally with Vicenza in Serie C1. He then joined Fiorentina in 1989, with whom he also played in the 1990 UEFA Cup Final. This was followed by a number of seasons at Serie B and Serie C1 level with many other teams, including a comeback at Fiorentina in 1993. He also won a promotion to Serie A in 1998 with Venezia.

== Coaching career ==
He started his coaching career in 2006 as part of the youth system of Vicenza and then joining Bassano in the same role in 2009.

In November 2012, he replaced Filippo Maniero in charge of Eccellenza amateurs Abano. In 2013, Zironelli left to become the new head coach of Serie D club Sacilese, serving until February 2015.

In June 2015, he took over from Diego Zanin at another Serie D club, Altovicentino, guiding them to second place at the end of the season. He successively accepted an offer from Mestre for the 2016–17 season, managing to win promotion to Lega Pro with the club. After a good Serie C season, he was subsequently hired by Bari in what turned out to be a short-lived experience with the Apulians; after going to the pre-season camp with the squad, he was released together with all the players following the club's exclusion from professional football due to financial debts.

Later, in August 2018, he was unveiled as the inaugural head coach of Juventus U23 after it was admitted in the Serie C as the very first reserve team ever to take part to the professional leagues of Italy. He left the club on 24 May 2019 after completing the Serie C season with the club.

On 18 June 2019 he was unveiled as the new head coach of Modena. He was dismissed by Modena on 25 November 2019 following 3 losses in last 5 league games.

On 28 October 2020 he was hired by Serie C club Sambenedettese. He resigned on 8 February 2021.

On 21 June 2021, he joined Lecco in Serie C. On 25 November 2021, he left Lecco by mutual consent.

On 30 May 2022, Zironelli was unveiled as the new head coach of Serie D club Luparense for the 2022–23 season. He was however sacked on 19 December 2022, leaving Luparense in eighth place in the league table, and replaced by his assistant Nicolò Cherubin, only to be called back just eight days later. He left the club for good by the end of the season.

Zironelli successively served as head coach of Serie D club San Marzano from November 2023 to June 2024, then successively joining fellow Serie D club Cjarlins Muzane.
