= Sven-Göran Eriksson =

Swedish football manager (1948–2024)

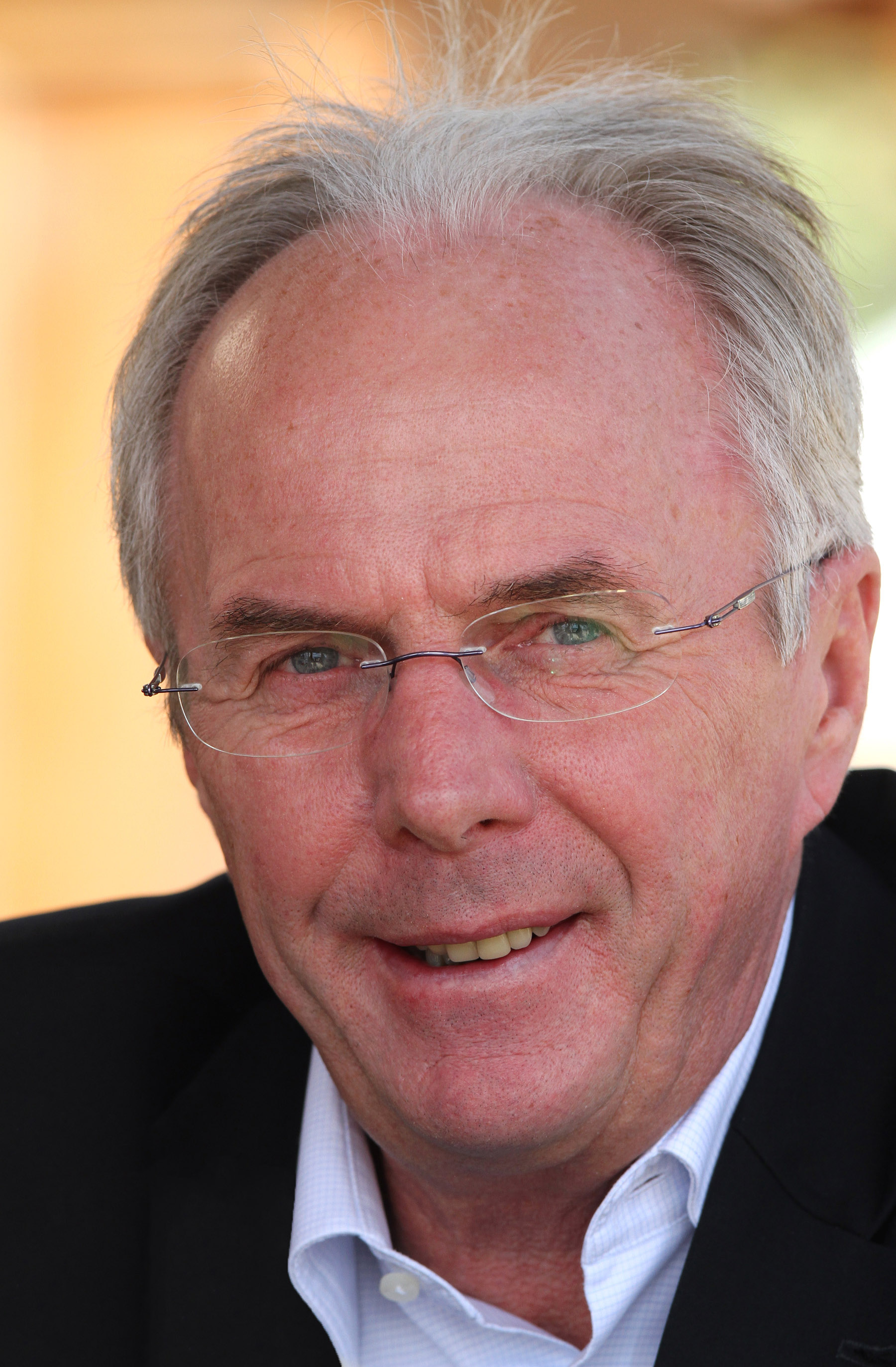
- Eriksson in 2012

Personal information
- Full name: Sven-Göran Eriksson
- Date of birth: 5 February 1948
- Place of birth: Sunne, Sweden
- Date of death: 26 August 2024 (aged 76)
- Place of death: Sunne, Sweden
- Height: 1.78 m (5 ft 10 in)
- Position: Right-back

Senior career*
Years	Team	Apps	(Gls)
1964–1971	Torsby IF	109	(23)
1971–1972	SK Sifhälla	22	(1)
1972–1973	KB Karlskoga	19	(4)
Total		150	(28)

Managerial career
- 1977–1978: Degerfors IF
- 1979–1982: IFK Göteborg
- 1982–1984: Benfica
- 1984–1987: Roma
- 1987–1989: Fiorentina
- 1989–1992: Benfica
- 1992–1997: Sampdoria
- 1997–2001: Lazio
- 2001–2006: England
- 2007–2008: Manchester City
- 2008–2009: Mexico
- 2009–2010: Notts County (Director of Football)
- 2010: Ivory Coast
- 2010–2011: Leicester City
- 2013–2014: Guangzhou R&F
- 2014–2016: Shanghai SIPG
- 2016–2017: Shenzhen FC
- 2018–2019: Philippines
- * Club domestic league appearances and goals

Sven-Göran Eriksson (Swedish pronunciation: [svɛnˈjœ̂ːran ˈêːrɪkˌsɔn]; 5 February 1948 – 26 August 2024) was a Swedish football player and manager. After a playing career as a right-back, Eriksson went on to experience major success in club management between 1977 and 2001, winning 18 trophies with a variety of league clubs in Sweden, Portugal, and Italy. In European competition, he won the UEFA Cup in 1982, the UEFA Cup Winners' Cup in 1999, the last edition of the tournament before its abolition, the UEFA Super Cup in 1999, and reached the European Cup final in 1990.

Eriksson later managed the national teams of England, Mexico, the Philippines and the Ivory Coast, as well as Manchester City and Leicester City in England. Eriksson coached in ten countries: Sweden, Portugal, Italy, England, Mexico, Ivory Coast, Thailand, the United Arab Emirates, China, and the Philippines.

== Early life ==
Sven-Göran Eriksson was born on 5 February 1948 in Sunne and raised in Torsby, both in Värmland, Sweden. His father, also named Sven (born 1929), was a bus conductor whilst his mother, Ulla (1926–2011), worked in a textile store. He was nicknamed "Svennis" after his younger brother Lars-Erik's attempt to pronounce his name; Eriksson went on to become known, and is generally referred to in Sweden mononymously, by this nickname.

== Playing career ==
Eriksson made his debut for Swedish football Division 4 team Torsby IF at the age of 16. He switched clubs to SK Sifhälla after moving to Säffle to study economics. In 1972, he joined Swedish football Division 2 team KB Karlskoga, where he also worked as a physical education teacher in Örebro.

Eriksson was heavily influenced by Karlskoga's player-manager, Tord Grip, who favoured the English style of play that Bob Houghton and Roy Hodgson had brought to the country. Eriksson retired from playing in 1975 at the age of 27, after giving up on his dream of playing professional football; he summed up his brief playing career by saying: "I was looked upon as a distinctly average defender, but someone who rarely made mistakes".

== Managerial career ==
=== Degerfors IF ===
Having retired as a player, Eriksson received an offer to become Tord Grip's assistant at Degerfors IF. A year later, Grip was appointed assistant manager of the Sweden national team, and Eriksson became Degerfors' manager. His stint as manager lasted from 1 January 1977 to 31 December 1978. He led the team to the playoffs in 1977 and 1978, winning the latter and promotion to Swedish Football Division 2.

=== IFK Göteborg ===
Eriksson's success with assistant manager Tom Chadney by his side attracted the attention of much larger clubs, and Eriksson was appointed manager of IFK Göteborg on 1 January 1979. The move was such a surprise that many of the players had never even heard of him.

IFK finished second in the Allsvenskan and won the Svenska Cupen for the first time in the club's history, defeating Åtvidabergs FF 6–1 in the final. Although results had improved, the team's style did not make him popular. He put results ahead of flair, emphasised tactical awareness and work rate, and he reined in the team's old cavalier style.

As a consequence, the average attendance fell by 3,000 to 13,320. Like Grip, he was influenced by Houghton and Hodgson and played a 4–4–2 with zonal marking and heavy pressing. IFK finished third in the 1980 season and second again in 1981. The following season, they won the treble. The team won the League and subsequent playoff, the Svenska Cupen, defeating Östers IF 3–2 in the final.

Eriksson's international breakthrough came during the spring of 1982, when he led IFK to the first ever UEFA Cup for a Swedish club, defeating Valencia in the quarter-finals and Kaiserslautern in the semi-finals. In the final they played Hamburger SV over two legs. In the first leg at home, IFK managed to score a late deciding goal, and took a 1–0 score with them to the away fixture. In Hamburg, they won 3–0 and thus won the 1981–82 UEFA Cup by an aggregate score of 4–0.

=== Benfica ===
Eriksson's European success led to him being recruited by Portuguese club Benfica, which he joined in end of June. Eriksson's influence was immediate, winning the Primeira Divisão, the Taça de Portugal and finishing runners-up in the 1982–83 UEFA Cup to Anderlecht. After winning a second consecutive league title, Eriksson then moved on to Italy, becoming manager of Roma.

=== Roma ===
Eriksson joined Roma on 1 July 1984. He was not as immediately successful at the Giallorossi as he had been before, but nonetheless still won a Coppa Italia with the club in 1986. Eriksson left the club on 6 May 1987.

=== Fiorentina and return to Benfica ===
Eriksson was manager of Fiorentina from 1 July 1987. Eriksson's stint with the club was trophyless, and he moved back to Benfica for a second stint in 1989. Eriksson led the Portuguese side to the final of the 1989–90 European Cup (losing to Milan 1–0) in 1990, and another Primeira Divisão title in 1991.

=== Sampdoria ===
In July 1992, Eriksson returned to Italy to lead Sampdoria, where he managed to win another Coppa Italia in 1994. In contrast to his predecessor, Vujadin Boškov, he introduced a defensive system which was based on zonal marking rather than man-marking. He left in June 1997.

=== Lazio ===
In December 1996, Eriksson agreed to leave Sampdoria at the end of the season to manage Blackburn Rovers. In February 1997, however, he went back on his word, and opted to stay in Italy and become the new manager at Lazio, beginning on 1 July 1997. Eriksson stated family reasons for wanting to stay in Italy, and Rovers would go on to appoint Roy Hodgson.

Eriksson employed fellow Swede Tord Grip as his assistant. Eriksson won the Coppa Italia and the Supercoppa Italiana in both 1998 and 2000, the UEFA Cup Winners' Cup (1999, its final edition), the 1999 UEFA Super Cup against recently treble-winning Manchester United, and the Serie A title (the Scudetto) in 2000 – only the second time that the Roman club had won the Italian championship in their history.

Eriksson had signed in October 2000 to be the new manager of the England national football team from June 2001, but was asked to resign by Lazio president Sergio Cragnotti in January 2001, with the club eleven points behind their capital city rivals Roma. His last game was an unexpected 2–1 home loss to Napoli, and he was succeeded by Dino Zoff.

=== England national football team ===
Following the resignation of England manager Kevin Keegan after a home loss to Germany in October 2000, The Football Association (FA) pursued Eriksson as his replacement. He was the first foreign manager of England. His debut on 28 February 2001 was a 3–0 friendly win over Spain at Villa Park, with the opening goal by Nick Barmby and the other two by substitutes Emile Heskey and Ugo Ehiogu; substitute goalkeeper Nigel Martyn also saved a penalty from Javi Moreno.

On 1 September 2001, Eriksson's team won 5–1 away to Germany in Munich; Germany had only ever lost one home game in World Cup qualification before, and had led the game after six minutes. On 6 October, a late free-kick equaliser by David Beckham ensured a 2–2 draw with Greece at Old Trafford, sending England directly to the 2002 FIFA World Cup.

==== 2002 World Cup ====
At the finals, England drew with Sweden, defeated Argentina 1–0, and drew with Nigeria to qualify in second place from the four-team group. They went on to defeat Denmark 3–0 in the Round of 16, before losing 2–1 to ten-man Brazil, who went on to win the tournament.

==== UEFA Euro 2004 ====
After winning their first qualifying match in Slovakia, England drew at home with Macedonia and were then booed off by their fans after losing a friendly to Australia. England, however, won their next five qualifiers and, needing a point from the last game to qualify, drew 0–0 in Turkey to top the group.

In their first match in the finals, England were winning 1–0 against France after 90 minutes, but lost after Zinedine Zidane scored twice in injury time. A 3–0 victory over Switzerland and a 4–2 victory over Croatia, however, meant England still qualified for a quarter-final against the hosts Portugal. There, Michael Owen gave England an early lead only for Hélder Postiga to equalize. England then had a Sol Campbell goal disallowed before ultimately losing on penalties.

==== 2006 World Cup ====
In March 2004, Eriksson's contract was extended by two years to cover UEFA Euro 2008. He said that he would have wanted to wait until after Euro 2004 to sign it, but it was necessary in order to counter rumours that he would leave for Chelsea. The FA did not confirm or deny rumours that the new contract included a clause allowing him to quit after the 2006 FIFA World Cup.

On 7 September 2005, Eriksson's England team lost a World Cup qualifying match against Northern Ireland 1–0. This was the first time that England had lost to these opponents since 1972, and the first time in Belfast since 1927. Although it was England's first-ever defeat in a World Cup or European Championship qualifying match under Eriksson, it brought his position under pressure and he was criticised, both by some fans and by commentators from the BBC, for his alleged lack of charisma and tactical awareness.

In January 2006, Eriksson was recorded saying he would be willing to leave England to manage Aston Villa if England won the World Cup, after being duped into believing that a wealthy Arab would buy the club, and wanted him as manager. The wealthy "Arab" was in fact the "Fake Sheikh" Mazher Mahmood, an undercover News of the World reporter. On 23 January, The FA announced that Eriksson would leave his job after the 2006 World Cup, and it was thought that the News of the World allegations played a part in this decision.

In March 2006, The Guardian reported that South Africa became the first potential employer publicly to register its interest in Eriksson.

England finished top of Group B at the finals, beating Paraguay and Trinidad and Tobago, before a 2–2 draw with Sweden, although the English press considered their performances far from satisfactory. After defeating Ecuador by a single Beckham free kick in the last 16, England were again eliminated on penalties by Portugal in the quarter-finals.

BBC Sport pundit Phil McNulty wrote a scathing review of Eriksson's period in charge, writing that he was unable to change games after England went behind, refused to drop Beckham and could not combine Frank Lampard and Steven Gerrard in midfield. McNulty added that Eriksson had chosen Theo Walcott for the 2006 World Cup without watching him play, and never fielded the Arsenal player, who had been chosen ahead of Jermain Defoe. Reflecting that Eriksson had taken over £20 million in salary, McNulty wrote "he will be remembered as a failure and a mighty pricey one at that".

Eriksson improved England's FIFA World Rankings place from seventeenth place in January 2001 to fifth in July 2006, reaching fourth during the 2006 World Cup, and was rated in 2007 by The FA as England's second most successful manager after Alf Ramsey. Under Eriksson, England achieved the highest point percentage in major tournament matches of all time for an England manager, losing only three competitive games (excluding extra time), and achieved top qualifying place in all three international tournaments.

In July 2006, after his final match with England, ESPN reported that he had turned down the chance to manage Jamaica, as well as an unknown participating club in the UEFA Champions League. In October 2006, it was rumoured he was in talks to manage Newcastle United, which his agent denied.

=== Manchester City ===
On 6 July 2007, virtually a year to the day that he left the England job, Eriksson was confirmed as the new manager of Manchester City after signing a three-year contract worth £2 million per year, plus bonuses. He was City's first manager from outside the United Kingdom and the first Swedish manager in the Premier League. Before the season started, he signed striker Rolando Bianchi, along with midfielders Gélson Fernandes, Geovanni, Martin Petrov and Elano; and defenders Vedran Ćorluka and Javier Garrido.

On 19 August, Manchester City beat reigning Premier League champions Manchester United to go top of the 2007–08 Premier League after three games without conceding a goal. Eriksson received the Premier League's Manager of the Month award for August. The club stayed in the top six throughout the rest of 2007, and were third throughout October and November, but fell to seventh on 12 January 2008 after winning only one of their previous five games.

In Spring 2008, owner Thaksin Shinawatra said that he would replace Eriksson after only one full season due to an "avalanche of very poor results which is unacceptable at this level". In the last game of the season, Manchester City suffered an 8–1 loss to Middlesbrough, the biggest defeat of Eriksson's career.

Manchester City ended in ninth place in the league, one place away from the UEFA Cup 2008–09 qualifying positions. Manchester City subsequently qualified through the extra place awarded to the Premier League for finishing as the highest placed team who had not already qualified for a European competition in the UEFA Fair Play League for 2007–08. Eriksson became the first Manchester City manager since 1969–70 to win both league derby games against Manchester United and also achieved the club's then joint highest Premier League point total, 55.

On 2 June 2008, Manchester City confirmed by club statement that they had parted company with Eriksson by "mutual consent", with Eriksson still having two years left on his contract.

=== Mexico national team ===
On 3 June 2008, Eriksson was officially signed to become manager of the Mexico national team. He formally started the role after Mexico's World Cup qualifier against Belize on 21 June. On 20 August 2008, he debuted as manager of Mexico in a CONCACAF World Cup qualifier versus Honduras. Mexico went on to win 2–1. During the next few matches, some results were poor, as Mexico drew with Canada and lost to Jamaica and Honduras.

On 11 February 2009, Eriksson was put under further pressure as his side lost 2–0 to the United States. Calls for him to quit or be sacked were heard from the fans while English club Portsmouth were rumoured to be interested in making him their new manager. This link was strengthened by reports of members from the Portsmouth board flying to Mexico City to discuss contract offers with Eriksson and a possible compensation settlement with the Mexican Football Federation.

On 3 March 2009, Eriksson continued to deny that he would leave Mexico and return to manage Portsmouth, insisting that he would remain and help Mexico qualify for the World Cup. After a 3–1 World Cup qualifying loss at Honduras, Eriksson was removed as national team coach. Eriksson had only won one of his last seven non-friendly games as manager.

=== Notts County ===
On 22 July 2009, Eriksson was appointed as director of football at English League Two team Notts County following that club's takeover by Middle East consortium Munto Finance with Eriksson getting a reported, but unconfirmed, £2 million per year deal.

Eriksson later said that he was attracted by the consortium's plans to take the world's oldest league club to the top of the Premier League, and believed that they had the finance and commitment to do that. Large-scale investment in new facilities were promised, and Sol Campbell and Kasper Schmeichel joined the club from Premier League teams. Campbell, however, played only one game before departing and Schmeichel was released at the end of the season.

County's large debts, including an unpaid tax bill, emerged in November 2009. On 11 February 2010, Eriksson resigned as director of football following the club's takeover by former Lincoln City chairman Ray Trew. Eriksson waived a multi-million payoff in order to assist the takeover, which chairman Trew described as the act of an "absolute gentleman". Notts County were promoted as League Two champions at the end of the season.

=== Ivory Coast ===
On 28 March 2010, Eriksson became the manager of the Ivory Coast national team. Disclosure of the amount of money Eriksson's contract was worth has never been confirmed, but it has been reported that he received £270,000 for accepting the job. On 15 June, Ivory Coast played an ill-tempered 0–0 draw against Portugal in their opening game in Group G of the 2010 World Cup finals, followed by a 3–1 loss against Brazil on 20 June.

Despite defeating the already-eliminated North Korea in the final group game 3–0, Ivory Coast failed to qualify for the knockout stage. Prior to the match against Brazil, Brazilian coach Dunga commented, "With Eriksson, Ivory Coast has great balance. We used to see them play and they didn't have this type of organisation that they have now."

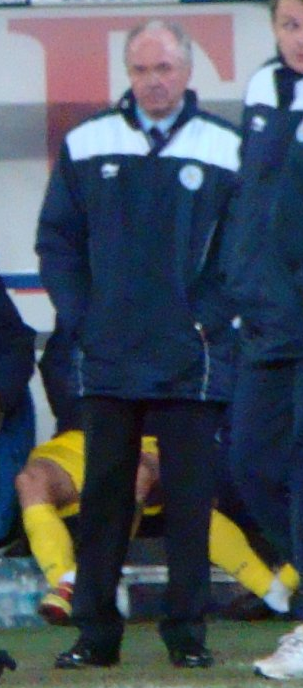
Eriksson while manager of Leicester City

As there were no reported negotiations of an extension to Eriksson's contract between his agent and the Ivorian Football Federation, his contract ended on 25 June.

=== Leicester City ===
Eriksson was appointed manager of Leicester City on 3 October 2010, as the Foxes sat in the relegation zone of the Championship. His first league game in charge resulted in a 1–1 draw against Hull City, managed by Nigel Pearson who had managed Leicester for the previous two seasons. This was quickly followed by Leicester's first victory under Eriksson, beating Leeds United 2–1 at Elland Road.

In December 2010, Eriksson denied that he had been in talks for becoming the new manager for Blackburn Rovers, following the exit of Sam Allardyce, stating he was happy managing Leicester.

Boosted by the loan signings of players such as Kyle Naughton and later Yakubu, results steadily improved under Eriksson as Leicester gradually began to climb the table, until a good run of form in the new year saw Leicester win seven of their first eight league games of 2011, and also take Premier League title challengers and eventual cup winners Manchester City to a replay in the FA Cup.

On 18 February 2011, after an injury time winner from Martyn Waghorn at home to Bristol City, Leicester had climbed to seventh in the table, and just one point off a play-off place. Leicester's form, however, began to stutter as they won just two out of their following eleven games. The Foxes ended up finishing the season in 10th position.

Eriksson spent big in a bid for promotion in the summer of 2011, including multimillion-pound transfer fees on Matt Mills and Jermaine Beckford. making them pre-season promotion favourites. After thirteen league matches, however, Eriksson left the club by mutual consent on 25 October 2011, with the Foxes 13th in the league, two points from a play-off position.

Three players who were signed by Eriksson – Kasper Schmeichel, David Nugent and Paul Konchesky – were part of the Leicester team that won the 2013–14 Championship and survived relegation from the 2014–15 Premier League under Nigel Pearson. Nugent credited Eriksson for his improved form at the club. Of the three, Schmeichel was a key member of the first team that won the 2015–16 Premier League.

=== 2012–2013 ===
In an interview with Yorkshire Radio on 8 February 2012, the chairman of Football League Championship club Leeds United, Ken Bates, revealed that Eriksson had applied for the vacant managerial position at the club after the dismissal of Simon Grayson. Bates went on to state that his application was unsuccessful. On 3 September 2012, Eriksson was unveiled as the technical director of BEC Tero Sasana, a team in the Thai League 1.

On 17 November 2012, Norwegian media reported that Eriksson was in talks with Vålerenga, about the possibility of taking over the soon to be available manager job for the Oslo-based club. A meeting between the two parties was held on 21 November in Oslo, but no deal was made. In December, negotiations between Eriksson and the Football Federation of Ukraine, who had offered him the position of head coach of the Ukraine national team, did not bear fruit.

On 15 January 2013, it was announced that Eriksson would be joining German 2. Bundesliga side 1860 Munich as assistant to Alexander Schmidt. On 18 January 2013, the club however reported, that Eriksson declined the offer to join 1860.

On 21 January 2013, Eriksson became technical director of Dubai-based club Al Nasr in the UAE Pro League.

=== China ===
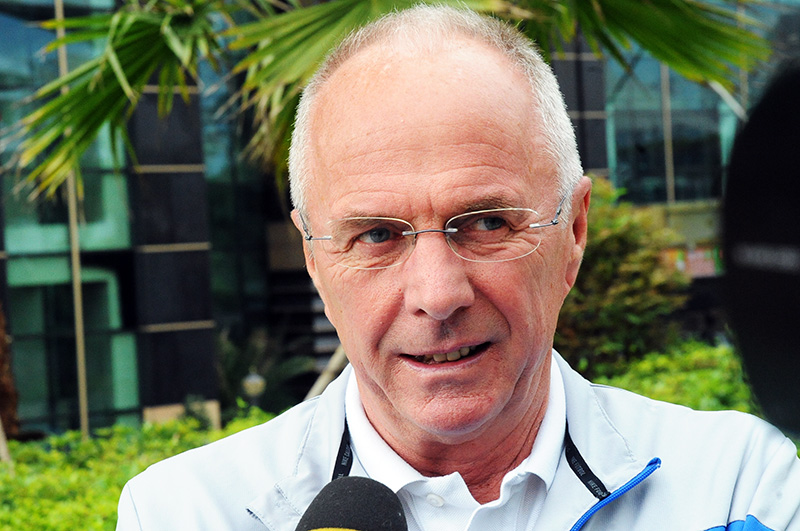
Eriksson in China, 2014

On 4 June 2013, Guangzhou R&F of the Chinese Super League announced Eriksson as their new head coach, on a nineteen-month contract lasting until December 2014. He was believed to be paid around £2 million a year for the job. He came up against former Italy manager Marcello Lippi in the city's derby matches, as the World Cup winner was manager of local rival Guangzhou Evergrande. Under Eriksson, Guangzhou R&F finished third in the league in 2014, and therefore qualified for the AFC Champions League for the first time. He left Guangzhou R&F on 10 November 2014, after a disagreement in negotiations for extending his contract.

Eriksson signed a two-year contract with fellow Chinese Super League side Shanghai SIPG on 18 November 2014. He led Shanghai SIPG to finish runners up in the season of 2015, and qualified for the AFC Champions League for the first time.

Under Eriksson, Shanghai SIPG advanced to the quarter-finals in their debut in the AFC Champions League, and secured a seat in the 2017 AFC Champions League by finishing third in the 2016 season. However, Eriksson was criticized for his tactical play and failure to give chances to young talents throughout his term at SIPG. He was replaced by André Villas-Boas on 4 November 2016.

On 5 December 2016, Eriksson became the manager of China League One side Shenzhen FC, replacing Clarence Seedorf. He won his first six matches of the season of 2017, including five league matches and a FA Cup match. However, Eriksson was sacked on 14 June 2017, following a nine-game run without a win.

=== Philippines national team ===
On 27 October 2018, Eriksson returned to international football after he was appointed head coach of the Philippines national team on a six-month contract. He was recommended to the position by interim coach Scott Cooper, who took over after Terry Butcher's resignation in August; Eriksson and Cooper previously worked together for English club Leicester City.

In October 2018, Eriksson met with the Filipino players during their training camp in Qatar. The 2018 AFF Championship was his first tournament leading the Philippines. With wins over Singapore and Timor-Leste, and draws with Thailand and Indonesia, the Philippines ended second place in Group B. However, the Philippines were defeated by eventual champions Vietnam on 4–2 aggregate in the two-legged semi-finals.

Eriksson was then tasked to lead the Philippines in the 2019 AFC Asian Cup—the team's first appearance in the tournament. They lost their first group match 1–0 to South Korea. This was followed by a 3–0 loss to China, which was coached by Eriksson's friend Marcello Lippi. Philippines ended their Asian Cup campaign in a 3–1 loss to Kyrgyzstan, where Stephan Schröck's consolation goal was the Philippines' only goal in the tournament.

After the Philippines' winless Asian Cup debut, Eriksson ended his tenure as head coach of the national team. However, he continued to serve as a consultant for quite some time.

== Style of management ==
Considered to be one of the greatest managers of all time, tactically, Eriksson was initially inspired by the style of his former teammate and manager Tord Grip early into his coaching career, who was in turn influenced by that of English managers Bob Houghton and Roy Hodgson, who introduced an innovative 4–4–2 formation into Swedish football, which made use of zonal marking and heavy pressing. While Eriksson's style was successful at IFK Göteborg, he also drew criticism from the fans for being overly pragmatic as a coach, with a focus on getting results over playing with flair, and placing a particular emphasis on the tactical awareness and work-rate of his teams.

During his time at Lazio, he also used a fluid 4–5–1 formation at times, in particular during the 1999–2000 season, which could become a 4–2–3–1, a 4–3–3, a 4–1–4–1, or a 4–4–2 throughout the course of a match. The team's gameplay was primarily based on creating a numerical advantage in the opposing half rather than controlling the ball, and through looking to attack and score as quickly as possible, while minimising risk. During the opening of matches, the team often played a vertical passing game, making use of long balls out from the back in an attempt to stretch their opponents, and create spaces for the team's more creative players to exploit. If this was done successfully, throughout the course of the match, the team would then play a series of many quick short passes in a more organised manner to build attacks. Eriksson also utilised the flanks offensively. He also placed significant importance on the physical and mental qualities of his players.

Defensively, his team still made use of pressing further up the pitch, and the team's formation would transform into an organised and compact 4–1–4–1 with little distance between the lines. At times, the team's defensive set-up made them vulnerable to counter-attacks or one-twos if their opponents broke through the first line, however, which allowed teams to play through them on occasion. In the first third of the pitch, Lazio would drop deeper to defend. While Eriksson used a zonal marking system in Sweden, at Lazio, he instead used a strategy which resembled the zona mista, which was a cross between zonal marking and man-to-man marking systems. Eriksson often rotated his players at Lazio. He alternated Giuseppe Pancaro or Giuseppe Favalli at left-back, who would overlap and join the attack, with Paolo Negro as the full-back on the right side of the team's four-man defence. He also successfully converted Siniša Mihajlović – formerly a left winger, second striker, or left-back – into a ball-playing centre-back or sweeper, alongside fellow ball-playing centre-back Alessandro Nesta.

During the 1999–2000 scudetto-winning season, he often deployed either Roberto Sensini or Matías Almeyda alongside Diego Simeone in midfield, to help cover for the team defensively. On the flanks, he often alternated Pavel Nedvěd, Roberto Mancini, or Alen Bokšić on the left, and one of Sérgio Conceição, Attilio Lombardo or Dejan Stanković on the right. All the team's midfielders were given the freedom to switch positions, to help give the team a numerical advantage in midfield when in possession, except for the deepest defensive midfielder, and the right winger; the latter was expected to push up the flank, take on opponents in one on one situations, and provide crosses into the box. The left winger, depending on the team selection, would often drift into the centre, either to support the midfield or the main striker, or make runs off the ball to get on the end of passes; he would also drop back into midfield to assist the team defensively off the ball, and cover for the full-backs. Eriksson was also praised for using Juan Sebastián Verón in a deeper playmaking role in midfield at Lazio behind the forwards, rather than in the more advanced role he had played at Parma, which had a positive impact on his performances. Verón later credited Eriksson with understanding his playing style better than any other manager and giving him considerable freedom on the pitch, which he felt allowed him to produce his best football. Verón also highlighted Eriksson's man-management as an important factor in Lazio's success, recalling that rather than placing excessive emphasis on tactical schemes, the manager encouraged the team's numerous talented players to put aside their individual egos for the benefit of the group. He also credited Eriksson with helping him develop both as a footballer and as a person. The team were also known for their effectiveness from set-pieces. Eriksson initially fielded two strikers – Marcelo Salas and Simone Inzaghi – before abandoning this system early into the 1999–2000 season, alternating one of them up-front as a lone centre-forward; Inzaghi would provide depth to the team with his runs, or get onto the end of passes and score, while Salas would look to get onto the end of crosses and long balls, or drop deep to link-up with the midfield and hold up the ball.

During his time as England's manager, however, Eriksson did come under criticism from pundits and the public for fielding Paul Scholes out of position, seemingly as a left midfielder, at Euro 2004, rather than in the centre, in order to accommodate Frank Lampard and Steven Gerrard in midfield; Eriksson defended this decision, however, stating that other players were not as adept in that role, and that he wanted to field his four strongest midfielders. He elaborated that Scholes was also given the freedom to move into the centre to help the midfield and receive the ball, something which Scholes himself confirmed, likening it to a role he had also played successfully under his Manchester United manager Alex Ferguson.

In addition to his success and tactical prowess, Eriksson was also known for his positive leadership style as a manager, which also influenced Carlo Ancelotti's coaching style during their time together at Roma in the 1980s. His coaching style at Lazio influenced his former Lazio players Simone Inzaghi, Diego Simeone, Roberto Mancini, and Matías Almeyda, who also went on to pursue coaching careers.

== Personal life ==
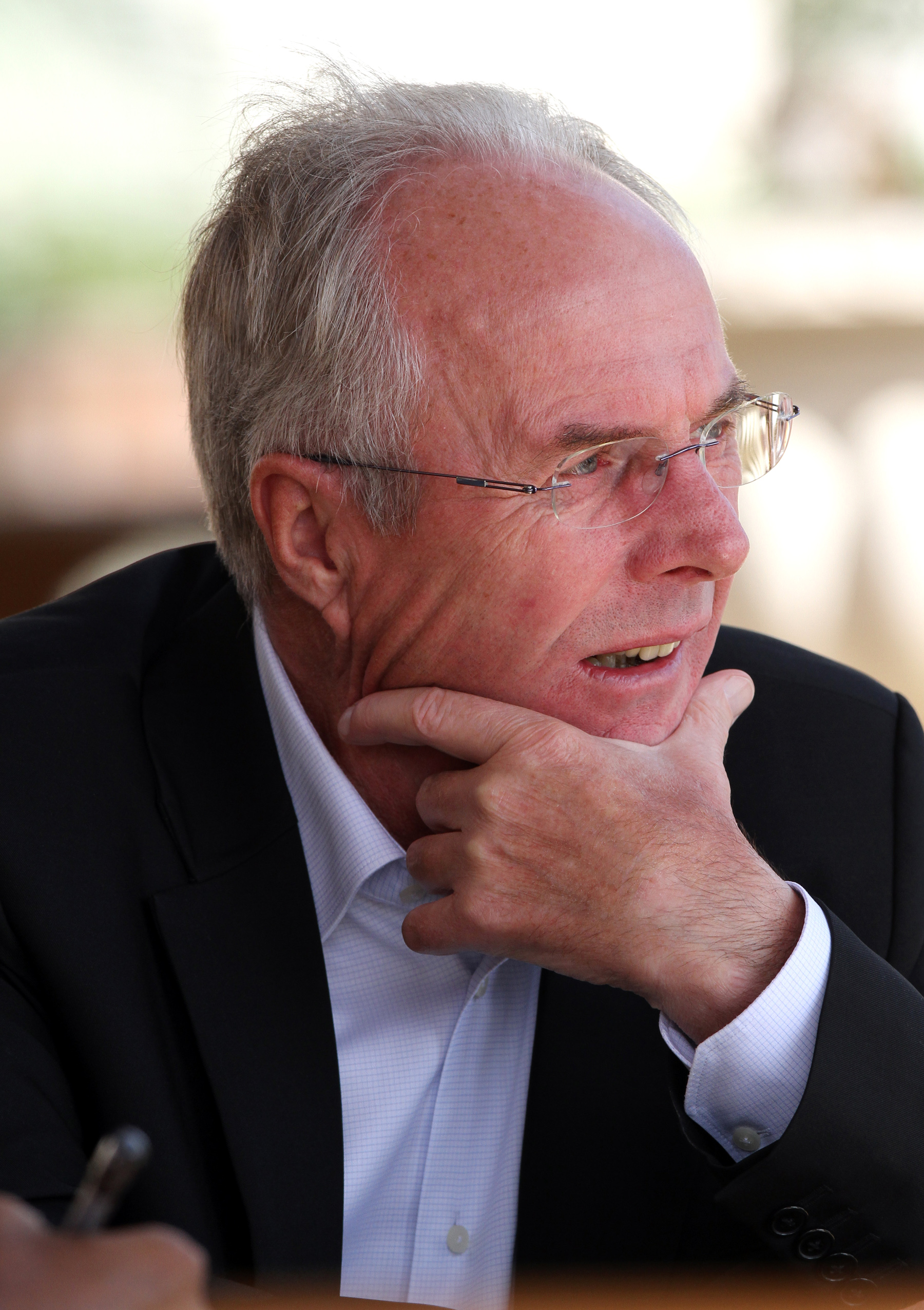
Eriksson in 2012

Eriksson was married to Ann-Christine Pettersson from July 1977 until their divorce in 1994. They had two children. In May 1998, Eriksson was introduced to Italian-American lawyer Nancy Dell'Olio, and they began a relationship six months later. In 2001, they relocated to London. In early 2002, Eriksson had an affair with British-Swedish television presenter Ulrika Jonsson, but he returned to Dell'Olio. In August 2004, he had an affair with British-Bangladeshi secretary Faria Alam.

In 2002, Eriksson endorsed the PlayStation games Sven-Göran Eriksson's World Cup Challenge and Sven-Göran Eriksson's World Cup Manager.

Eriksson's autobiography, My Story, was published in November 2013.

In October 2016, Eriksson announced he was to take legal action against Mazher Mahmood, on the basis that the January 2006 News of the World story had cost him the England coaching job.

== Illness and death ==
In January 2024, Eriksson announced that he had been diagnosed with terminal pancreatic cancer and had "at best about a year to live". In March 2024, he was invited to manage the Liverpool Legends for a charity match against Ajax; Eriksson was a lifelong fan of Liverpool and had always aspired to manage the club. Eriksson was, after that, honoured by his former clubs Benfica, IFK Göteborg, Sampdoria, Lazio, Degerfors IF, and Torsby IF at their respective stadiums.

Eriksson died at his home in Björkefors near Sunne, Sweden, on the morning of 26 August 2024, at the age of 76. The world of football paid many tributes to Eriksson. His former England captain David Beckham said "Sven, thank you for always being the person you have always been – passionate, caring, calm and a true gentleman. I will be forever grateful for you making me your captain but I will forever hold these last memories of this day with you and your family... Thank you Sven and in your last words to me 'It will be ok'." His funeral took place on 13 September 2024 at Fryksände church in Torsby, Sweden. Many football people attended, among them David Beckham, Tord Grip and Thomas Nordahl, son of the Swedish former footballer Gunnar Nordahl. Afterwards, his remains were cremated and placed in an urn, after his wish to have his ashes scattered across the Fryken was denied by local authorities.

== Managerial statistics ==
Nation	Team	From	To	Record				
Nation	Team	From	To	Pld	W	D	L	Win%
(Sweden)	Degerfors IF	January 1977	December 1978					
(Sweden)	IFK Göteborg	January 1979	June 1982	134	76	34	24	56.72
(Portugal)	Benfica	July 1982	June 1984	78	57	14	7	73.08
(Italy)	Roma	July 1984	May 1987	125	58	36	31	46.40
(Italy)	Fiorentina	July 1987	June 1989	64	21	20	23	32.81
(Portugal)	Benfica	July 1989	June 1992	144	94	32	18	65.28
(Italy)	Sampdoria	July 1992	June 1997	198	83	58	57	41.92
(Italy)	Lazio	July 1997	January 2001	136	78	32	26	57.35
(England)	England	12 January 2001	1 July 2006	67	40	17	10	59.70
(England)	Manchester City	6 July 2007	2 June 2008	45	19	11	15	42.22
(Mexico)	Mexico	June 2008	April 2009	13	6	1	6	46.15
(Ivory Coast)	Ivory Coast	March 2010	June 2010	5	2	2	1	40.00
(England)	Leicester City	October 2010	October 2011	49	22	12	15	44.90
(China)	Guangzhou R&F	June 2013	November 2014	48	25	10	13	52.08
(China)	Shanghai SIPG	November 2014	November 2016	76	42	20	14	55.26
(China)	Shenzhen FC	December 2016	June 2017	15	6	5	4	40.00
(Philippines)	Philippines	October 2018	January 2019	9	2	2	5	22.22
Total				1,207	631	307	269	52.28

=== List of seasons ===
- LC = League Cup
- SC = Super Cup
- UCL = UEFA Champions League (European Cup prior to 1992)
- CWC = UEFA Cup Winners' Cup (discontinued 1999)
- UC = UEFA Cup (Now UEFA Europa League)
- USC = UEFA Super Cup
- ACL = AFC Champions League

Champions	Runners-up	Third / SF	Unfinished

Season	Club	Nat.	Domestic				Continental					Trophies
Season	Club	Nat.	League	Cup	LC	SC	UCL	CWC	UC	USC	ACL	Trophies
1979	IFK Göteborg	(Sweden)	RU	W	n/a							1
1980	IFK Göteborg	(Sweden)	3rd	QF	n/a			QF				–
1981	IFK Göteborg	(Sweden)	RU	6R	n/a				1R			–
1982	IFK Göteborg	(Sweden)	W	W	n/a				W			3
1982–83	Benfica	(Portugal)	W	W	n/a				RU			2
1983–84	Benfica	(Portugal)	W	5R	n/a	RU	QF					1
1984–85	Roma	(Italy)	7th	R16	n/a							–
1985–86	Roma	(Italy)	RU	W	n/a							1
1986–87	Roma	(Italy)	7th	R16	n/a			1R				–
1987–88	Fiorentina	(Italy)	8th	R16	n/a							–
1988–89	Fiorentina	(Italy)	7th	QF	n/a							–
1989–90	Benfica	(Portugal)	RU	4R	n/a	W	RU					1
1990–91	Benfica	(Portugal)	W	QF	n/a				1R			1
1991–92	Benfica	(Portugal)	RU	SF	n/a	RU	GS					–
1992–93	Sampdoria	(Italy)	7th	2R	n/a							–
1993–94	Sampdoria	(Italy)	3rd	W	n/a							1
1994–95	Sampdoria	(Italy)	8th	R16	n/a	RU		SF				–
1995–96	Sampdoria	(Italy)	8th	R16	n/a							–
1996–97	Sampdoria	(Italy)	6th	R32	n/a							–
1997–98	Lazio	(Italy)	7th	W	n/a				RU			1
1998–99	Lazio	(Italy)	RU	QF	n/a	W		W				2
1999–2000	Lazio	(Italy)	W	W	n/a		QF	n/a		W		3
2000–01	Lazio	(Italy)	3rd	QF	n/a	W	2R	n/a				1
2007–08	Manchester City	(England)	9th	4R	QF							–
2010–11	Leicester City	(England)	10th	3R	4R							–
2011–12	Leicester City	(England)	9th	QF	3R							–
2013	Guangzhou R&F	(China)	6th	4R	n/a							–
2014	Guangzhou R&F	(China)	3rd	4R	n/a							–
2015	Shanghai SIPG	(China)	RU	QF	n/a							–
2016	Shanghai SIPG	(China)	3rd	4R	n/a						QF	–
2017	Shenzhen FC	(China)	6th	3R	n/a							–

== Honours ==
=== Manager ===
Degerfors

- Division 3 Västra Svealand: 1978

IFK Göteborg

- Allsvenskan 1982
- Svenska Cupen: 1978–79, 1981–82
- UEFA Cup: 1981–82

Benfica

- Primeira Divisão: 1982–83, 1983–84, 1990–91
- Taça de Portugal: 1982–83
- Supertaça Cândido de Oliveira: 1989
- European Cup runner-up: 1989–90
- UEFA Cup runner-up: 1982–83

Roma

- Coppa Italia: 1985–86

Sampdoria

- Coppa Italia: 1993–94

Lazio

- Serie A: 1999–2000
- Coppa Italia: 1997–98, 1999–2000
- Supercoppa Italiana: 1998, 2000
- UEFA Cup Winners' Cup: 1998–99
- UEFA Super Cup: 1999
- UEFA Cup runner-up: 1997–98

Individual

- Serie A Coach of the Year: 1999–2000
- BBC Sports Personality of the Year Coach Award: 2001
- Premier League Manager of the Month: August 2007

== See also ==
- List of football managers with the most matches
