= Stadio Marcello Melani =

Stadium in Pistoia, Italy

Coordinates: 43°56′27″N 10°54′53″E

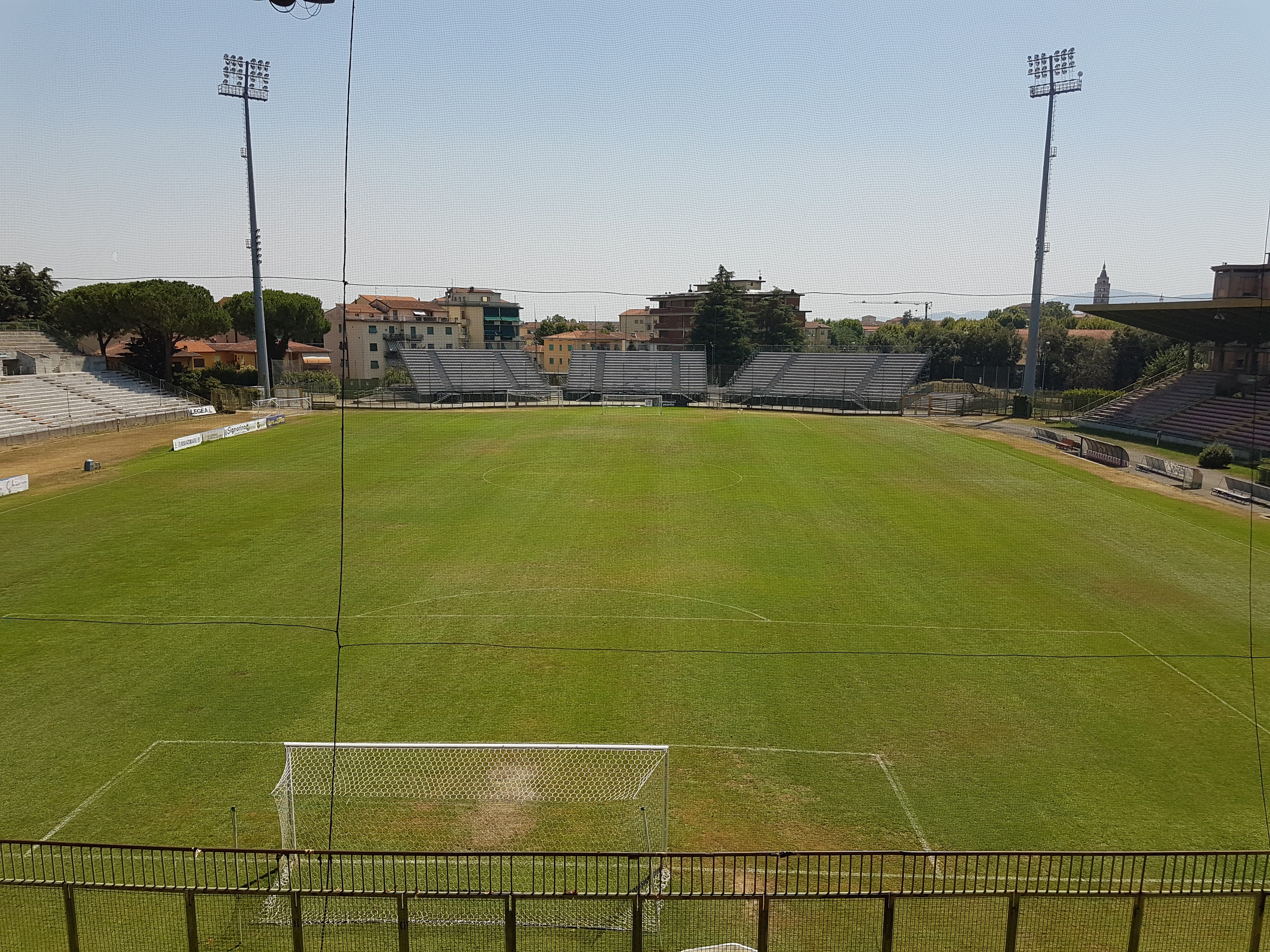
- Interactive map of Stadio Marcello Melani
- Former names: Stadio Comunale (1966-2006)
- Location: Pistoia, Italy
- Owner: Municipality of Pistoia
- Capacity: 13,195
- Surface: Grass

Construction
- Opened: 25 June 1966
- Renovated: 1980, 2000

Tenant
- Pistoiese FC

Stadio Marcello Melani is the main stadium in Pistoia, Italy. It is primarily used for football matches and serves as the home ground of U.S. Pistoiese 1921. The stadium has a capacity of 13,195.

== History ==
The Stadio Comunale di Pistoia opened on 25 June 1966 with a friendly match between Pistoiese and Vasco de Gama (1–2).

Before this, Pistoiese played at the smaller "Monteoliveto" stadium, where approximately 600 official matches were held.

On 6 December 2006, the Stadio Comunale was renamed in honor of Marcello Melani, who served as the president of Pistoiese from 1974 to 1984. Under his leadership, the club achieved its only promotion to Serie A in its history.

== Current status ==
As of the start of the 2021–22 season, two stands are operational: the Curva Sud for visiting supporters and the main (west) stand for home supporters. The Curva Nord and the east side terraced stand remain closed.

== Gallery ==
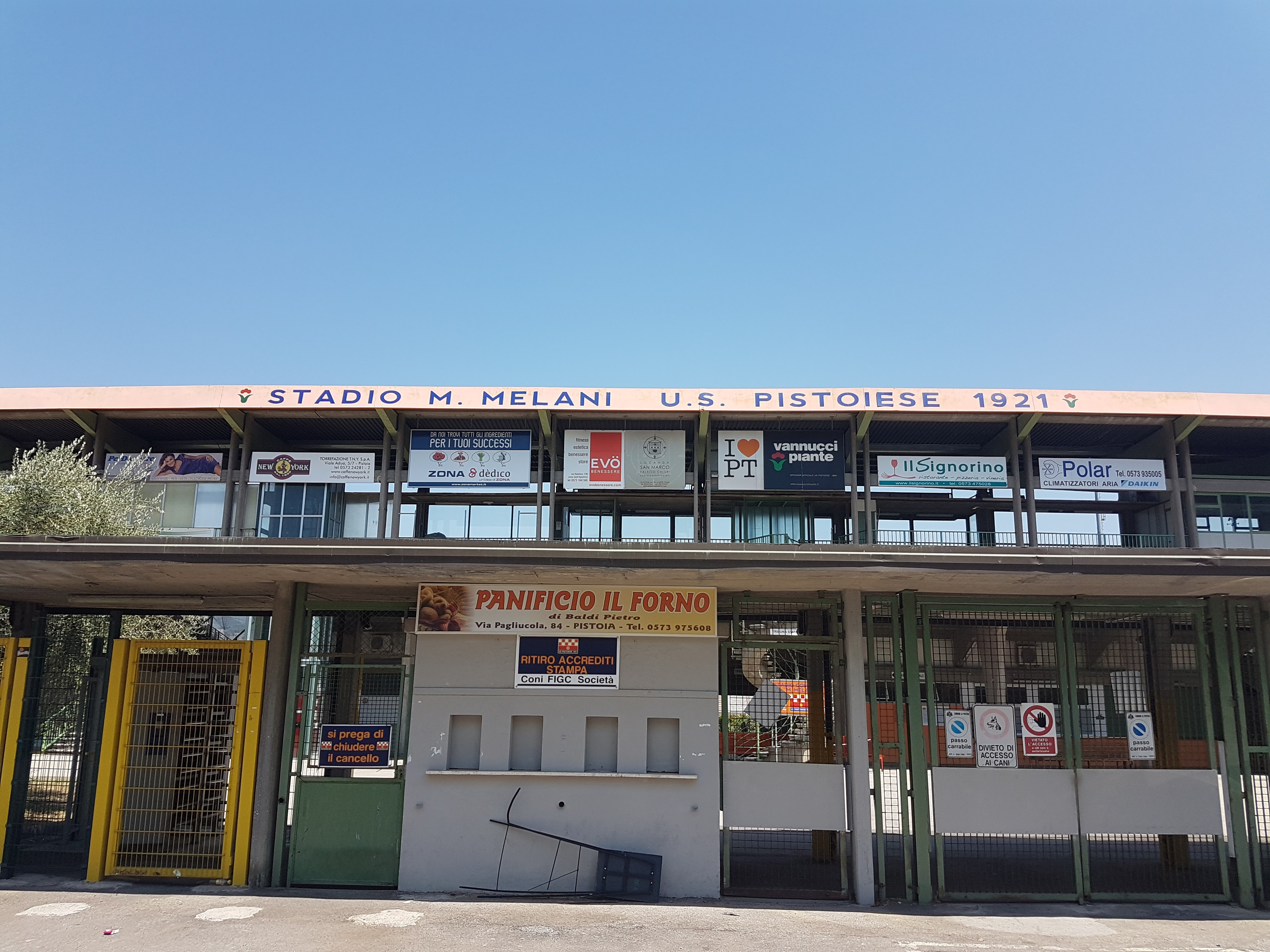

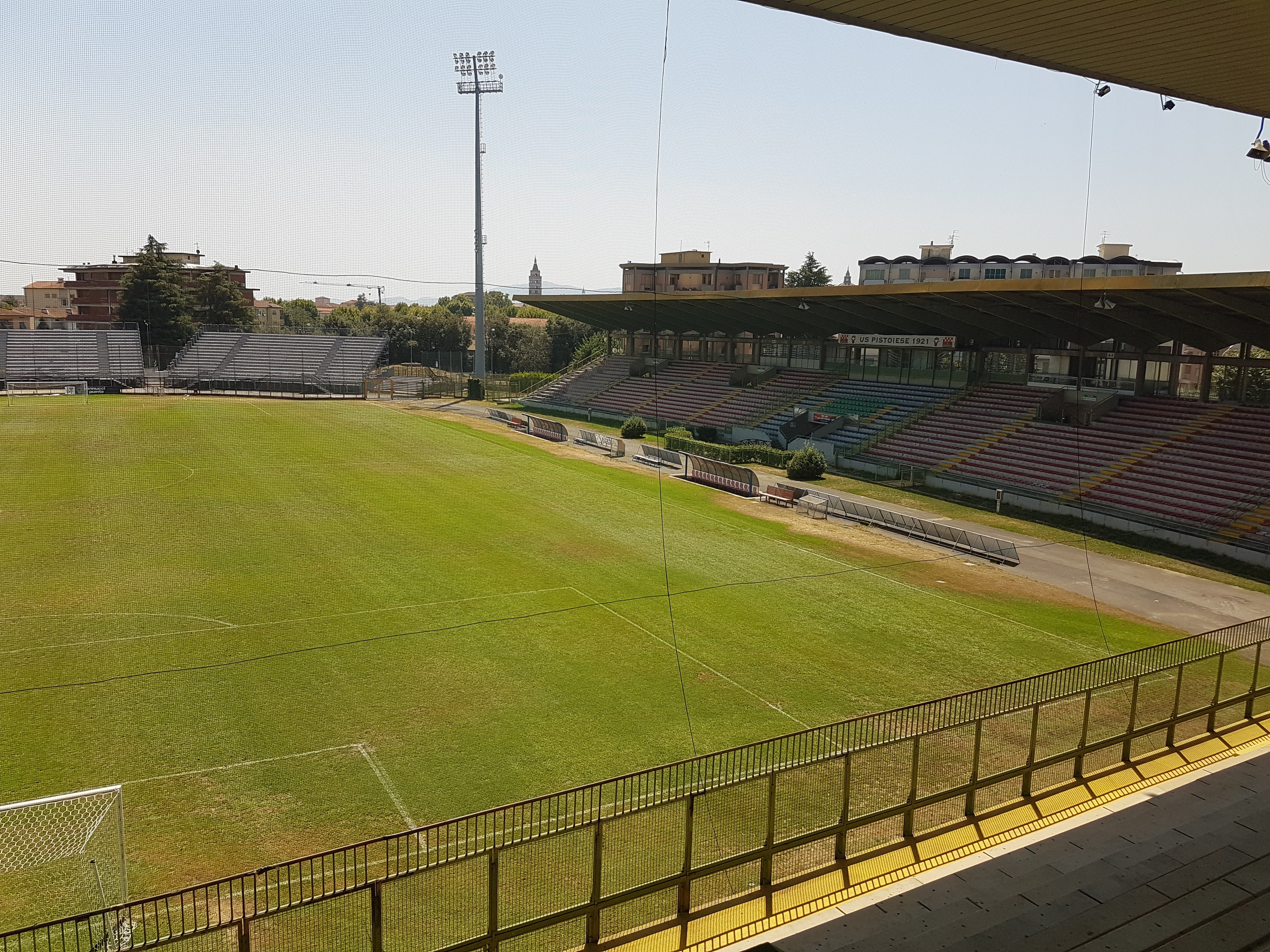

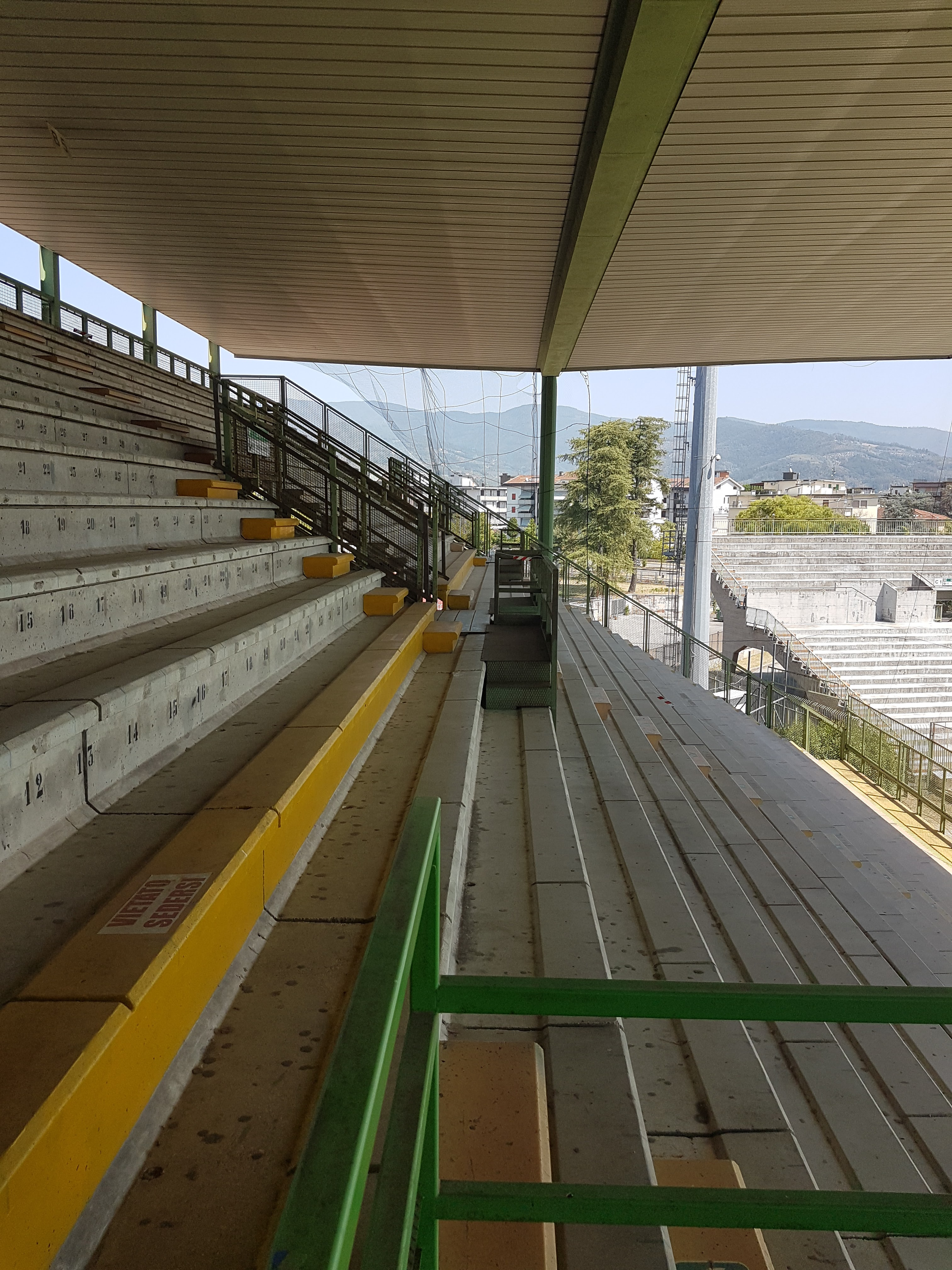

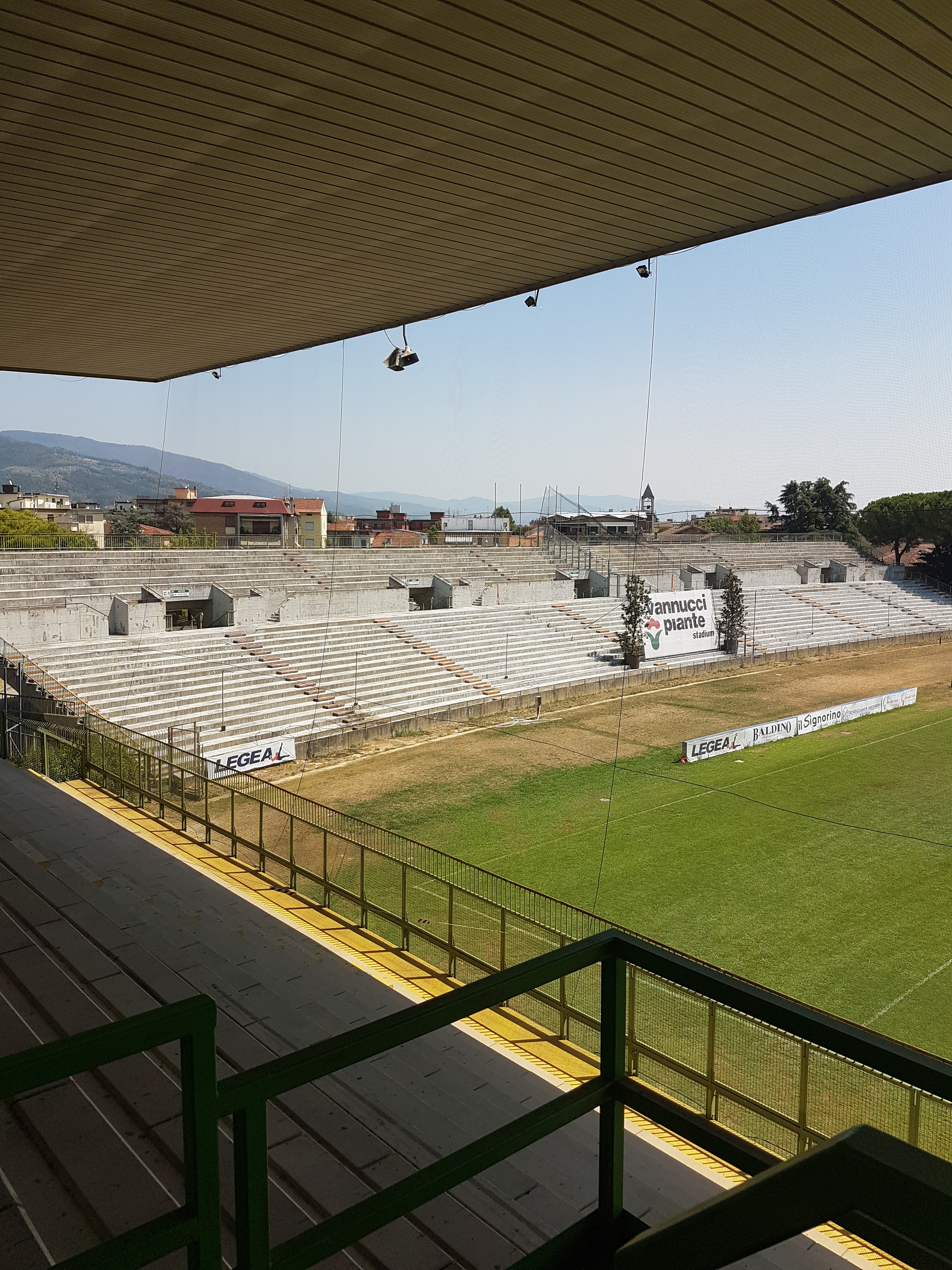

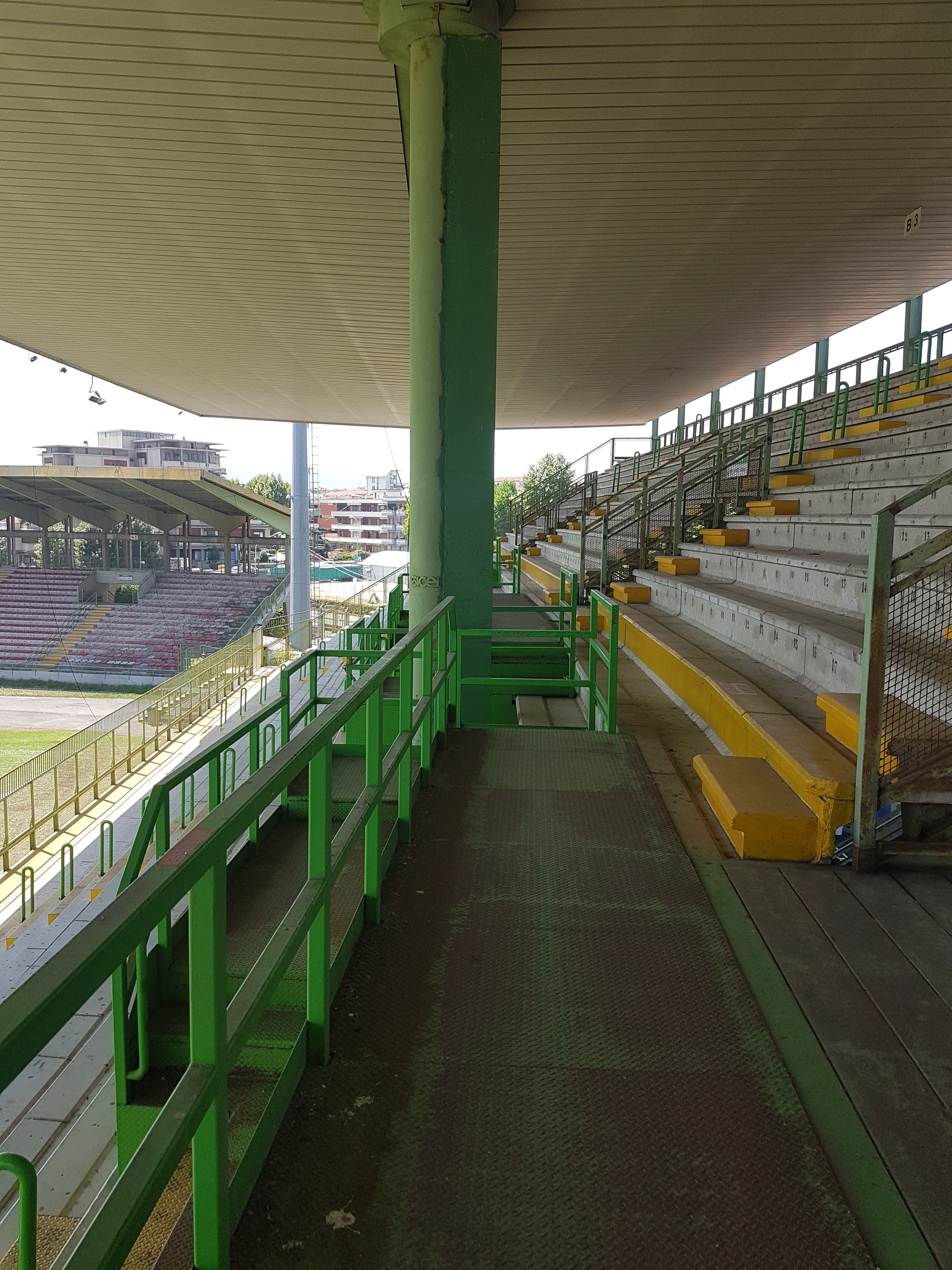
