= Giacomo Callegari =

Italian footballer

Personal information
- Date of birth: 21 May 1971 (age 55)
- Place of birth: Cascina
- Height: 1.77 m (5 ft 10 in)
- Position: Midfielder

Senior career*
Years	Team	Apps	(Gls)
1989–1990	Fiorentina		
1991–1993	Siena		
1993–1994	Matera		
1994–1995	Cecina		
1995–1997	Pontedera		
1997–1999	Trento		
1999–2002	Poggibonsi		
2002–2004	Grosseto		
- * Club domestic league appearances and goals

Giacomo Callegari (born 26 May 1971) is a retired Italian footballer who played as a midfielder.
