= Giacomo Banchelli =

Italian footballer (born 1973)

Personal information
- Date of birth: 14 June 1973 (age 53)
- Place of birth: Vinci, Italy
- Height: 1.78 m (5 ft 10 in)
- Position: Striker

Senior career*
Years	Team	Apps	(Gls)
1989–1996	Fiorentina	42	(9)
1992–1993	→ Alessandria (loan)	32	(12)
1994	→ Cosenza (loan)	0	(0)
1995	→ Udinese (loan)	11	(1)
1996–1997	Cagliari	10	(5)
1997–1998	Reggiana	28	(10)
1998–2000	Atalanta	17	(2)
1999–2000	→ Pistoiese (loan)	27	(9)
2000&–2001	Empoli	10	(1)
2001–2002	Pistoiese	26	(6)
2002–2003	Carrarese	32	(15)
2003	Taranto	13	(6)
2004	Lodigiani	32	(16)
2005	Carrarese	17	(6)
2005–2006	Cisco Roma	28	(8)
2006–2007	Cappiano Romaiano	26	(9)
2007–2008	Montichiari		
2008	Cynthia	9	(4)
2008–2009	Scandicci		
2009–2010	Pistoiese		
- * Club domestic league appearances and goals

Giacomo Banchelli (born 14 June 1973 in Vinci, Tuscany) is a former Italian football player who last played as a striker for A.C. Pistoiese. He started playing for Serie A in ACF Fiorentina when he was 16 years old. After that, he played for many teams including Cagliari e Atalanta and a few Serie B teams.

== Honours ==
Fiorentina

- Coppa Italia: 1995–96
