= Luca Mattei =

Italian footballer

Personal information
- Date of birth: 10 November 1964 (age 61)
- Place of birth: Livorno
- Position: Midfielder

Senior career*
Years	Team	Apps	(Gls)
1981–1982	Cerretese		
1982–1985	Varese		
1985–1988	Como		
1988–1989	Fiorentina		
1989–1993	Udinese		
1993–1994	Pisa		
1994–1995	Juve Stabia		
1995–1996	Torrelaghese		
- * Club domestic league appearances and goals

Luca Mattei (born 10 November 1964) is a retired Italian football midfielder.
