= Giuseppe Pellicanò =

Italian footballer

Personal information
- Date of birth: 24 March 1954 (age 72)
- Place of birth: Reggio Calabria, Italy
- Height: 1.80 m (5 ft 11 in)
- Position: Goalkeeper

Senior career*
Years	Team	Apps	(Gls)
1974–1975	Rondinella	33	(0)
1975–1976	Fiorentina	0	(0)
1976–1977	Montecatini	34	(0)
1977–1979	Empoli	63	(0)
1979–1981	Fiorentina	0	(0)
1981–1985	Arezzo	135	(0)
1985–1988	Bari	63	(0)
1988–1990	Fiorentina	11	(0)
- * Club domestic league appearances and goals

Giuseppe Pellicanò (born 24 March 1954 in Reggio Calabria) is an Italian former professional footballer who played as a goalkeeper.
