= 1986–87 AC Fiorentina season =

AC Fiorentina
1986-1987 season
- President: Pier Cesare Baretti
- Manager: Eugenio Bersellini
- Stadium: Comunale
- Serie A: 10th
- Coppa Italia: First round
- UEFA Cup: Round of 32
- Top goalscorer: League: Diaz (10); All: Díaz (10)
| Home colours | Away colours |

During the 1986–1987 season Associazione Calcio Fiorentina competed in Serie A, Coppa Italia and UEFA Cup.

== Summary ==
During July Pier Cesare Baretti arrived to the club as its new Chairman and appointed a new manager for the squad Eugenio Bersellini, former winner of 1979-80 Serie A title managing Inter. The team was reinforced with several players such as Roberto Galbiati, Marco Landucci replacing goalkeeper Giovanni Galli, transferred out to A.C. Milan. From Parma F.C. arrived midfielder Nicola Berti and from U.S. Avellino 1912 Argentine forward Ramon Diaz. After a year injured, Roberto Baggio, could play as starter.

The team was early eliminated in both Coppa Italia and UEFA Cup. The squad finishes in a disappointing 9th place in Serie A Argentine striker Ramon Diaz was the club's top scorer with 10 goals. With 19 matches and 4 goals, Giancarlo Antognoni played his last season for the club, (341 games played and 61 goals since 1972) transferring out to Lausanne Sports.

== Squad ==
Note: Flags indicate national team as defined under FIFA eligibility rules; some limited exceptions apply. Players may hold more than one non-FIFA nationality.

| Pos. | Nation | Player |
|---|---|---|
| GK | ITA | Marco Landucci |
| GK | ITA | Paolo Conti |
| DF | ITA | Stefano Carobbi |
| DF | ITA | Renzo Contratto |
| DF | ITA | Alberto Di Chiara |
| DF | ITA | Lorenzo Fabiani |
| DF | ITA | Roberto Galbiati |
| DF | ITA | Claudio Gentile |
| DF | ITA | Gabriele Oriali |
| DF | ITA | Carlo Pascucci |
| DF | ITA | Celeste Pin |
| DF | ITA | Andrea Rocchigiani |
| MF | ITA | Giancarlo Antognoni (Captain) |
| MF | ITA | Sergio Battistini |
| MF | ITA | Nicola Berti |
| MF | ITA | Michele Gelsi |

| Pos. | Nation | Player |
|---|---|---|
| MF | ITA | Michele Gelsi |
| MF | ITA | Aldo Maldera (III) |
| MF | ITA | Alberto Nardi |
| MF | ITA | Roberto Onorati |
| FW | ITA | Roberto Baggio |
| FW | ITA | Maurizio Iorio |
| FW | ARG | Ramón Díaz |
| MF | ITA | Simone Sereni |
| FW | ITA | Paolo Monelli |
| FW | ITA | Davide Pellegrini |
| MF | ITA | Antonio Strano |
| FW | ITA | Gianfranco Campioli |

=== Transfers ===
In
| Pos. | Name | from | Type |
|---|---|---|---|
| FW | Ramon Diaz | Avellino | - |
| GK | Marco Landucci | Parma F.C. | loan ended |
| DF | Roberto Galbiati | Pescara | |

Out
| Pos. | Name | To | Type |
|---|---|---|---|
| GK | Giovanni Galli | A.C. Milan | - |
| FW | Daniele Massaro | A.C. Milan | |
| DF | Daniel Passarella | Inter | |
| DF | Maurizio Iorio | Brescia | |

== Competitions ==
=== League table ===
| Pos | Team | Pld | W | D | L | GF | GA | GD | Pts |
|---|---|---|---|---|---|---|---|---|---|
| 8 | Avellino | 30 | 9 | 12 | 9 | 31 | 38 | −7 | 30 |
| 9 | Como | 30 | 5 | 16 | 9 | 16 | 20 | −4 | 26 |
| 10 | Fiorentina | 30 | 8 | 10 | 12 | 30 | 35 | −5 | 26 |
| 11 | Torino | 30 | 8 | 10 | 12 | 26 | 32 | −6 | 26 |
| 12 | Ascoli | 30 | 7 | 10 | 13 | 18 | 33 | −15 | 24 |

Source: 1986–87 Serie A, RSSSF.com
Rules for classification: 1) Points; 2) Head-to-head points; 3) Head-to-head goal difference; 4) Goal difference; 5) Goals scored; 6) Draw. (Note: Head-to-head record is used only after all the matches between the teams in question have been played).

==== Result by round ====
| Round | 1 | 2 | 3 | 4 | 5 | 6 | 7 | 8 | 9 | 10 | 11 | 12 | 13 | 14 | 15 | 16 | 17 | 18 | 19 | 20 | 21 | 22 | 23 | 24 | 25 | 26 | 27 | 28 | 29 | 30 |
|---|---|---|---|---|---|---|---|---|---|---|---|---|---|---|---|---|---|---|---|---|---|---|---|---|---|---|---|---|---|---|
| Ground | A | H | A | H | H | A | H | A | A | H | A | H | A | H | A | H | A | H | A | A | H | A | H | H | A | H | A | H | A | H |
| Result | L | W | D | L | D | D | L | L | W | W | L | L | L | W | L | W | L | W | D | L | L | D | D | W | D | D | L | D | D | W |
| Position | 10 | 6 | 7 | 10 | 10 | 9 | 11 | 12 | 10 | 9 | 11 | 11 | 11 | 11 | 12 | 10 | 12 | 10 | 10 | 12 | 12 | 12 | 11 | 11 | 11 | 10 | 11 | 11 | 11 | 10 |

Source: Competitive matches
A = Away; H = Home; W = Win; D = Draw; L = Loss; P = Postponed; = Leader, 1987–88 European Cup; = 1987–88 UEFA Cup

==== Matches ====
| 14 September 1986 1 | U.S. Avellino 1912 | 2–1 | Fiorentina | Avellino |
| | Dirceu 27', 85' | Report | 35' Diaz | Stadium: Partenio; Referee: Pierluigi Magni |

| 21 September 1986 2 | Fiorentina | 2–0 | Sampdoria | Florence |
| | Diaz 73', 85' | Report | | Stadium: Comunale; Referee: Paolo Casarin |

| 28 September 1986 3 | Brescia Calcio | 0–0 | Fiorentina | Brescia |
| | | Report | | Stadium: Mario Rigamonti; Referee: Arcangelo Pezzella |

| 5 October 1986 4 | Fiorentina | 0–1 | Udinese | Florence |
| | | Report | 8' Chierico | Stadium: Comunale; Referee: Alberto Boschi |

| 12 October 1986 5 | Fiorentina | 1–1 | Juventus | Florence |
| | Diaz 10' | Report | 58' Vignola | Stadium: Comunale; Referee: Pietro D'Elia |

| 19 October 1986 6 | Como 1907 | 0–0 | Fiorentina | Como |
| | | Report | | Stadium: Giuseppe Sinigaglia; Referee: Claudio Pieri |

| 26 October 1986 7 | Fiorentina | 0–1 | Hellas Verona | Florence |
| | | Report | 65' Pacione | Stadium: Comunale; Referee: Rosario Lo Bello |

| 2 November 1986 8 | A.C. Milan | 3–0 | Fiorentina | Milan |
| | F. Baresi 41' (pen.); Virdis 74', 77' | Report | | Stadium: San Siro; Referee: Carlo Longhi |

| 9 November 1986 9 | Ascoli | 0–1 | Fiorentina | Ascoli Piceno |
| | | Report | 62' Oriali | Stadium: Cino e Lillo Del Duca; Referee: Pierluigi Magni |

| 23 November 1986 10 | Fiorentina | 2–1 | Roma | Florence |
| | Diaz 21'; Berti 68' | Report | 26' Pruzzo | Stadium: Comunale; Referee: Paolo Casarin |

| 30 November 1986 11 | Empoli F.C. | 1–0 | Fiorentina | Empoli |
| | Ekström 43' | Report | | Stadium: Carlo Castellini; Referee: Agnolin |

| 14 December 1986 12 | Fiorentina | 0–1 | Inter | Florence |
| | | Report | 46' Passarella | Stadium: Comunale; Referee: Pieri |

| 21 December 1986 13 | Torino | 2–1 | Fiorentina | Torino |
| | Francini 5'; Cravero 63' | Report | 65' Antognoni | Stadium: Comunale; Referee: Longhi |

| 4 January 1987 14 | Fiorentina | 3–1 | S.S.C. Napoli | Florence |
| | Diaz 6'; Antognoni 25'; Monelli 89' | Report | 50' Maradona | Stadium: Comunale; Referee: Lanese |

| 11 January 1987 15 | Atalanta B.C. | 2–0 | Fiorentina | Bergamo |
| | Francis 6'; Magrin 72' (pen.) | Report | | Stadium: Stadio Comunale; Referee: Sguizzato |

| 18 January 1987 16 | Fiorentina | 2–0 | Avellino | Florence |
| | Diaz 48'; Battistini | Report | | Stadium: Comunale; Referee: Mattei |

| 1 February 1987 17 | Sampdoria | 3–1 | Fiorentina | Genoa |
| | R. Mancini 44'; Briegel 65'; Vialli 85' | Report | 38' Monelli | Stadium: Stadio Luigi Ferraris; Referee: Agnolin |

| 8 February 1987 18 | Fiorentina | 4–3 | Brescia Calcio | Florence |
| | Giorgi 2' (o.g.), 60' (o.g.); Berti 27'; Gritti 41' (o.g.) | Report | 28', 78' Bonometti | Stadium: Comunale; Referee: Lombardo |

| 22 February 1987 19 | Udinese Calcio | 1–1 | Fiorentina | Udine |
| | F. Graziani 18' | Report | 73' Berti | Stadium: Stadio Friuli; Referee: D'Elia |

| 1 March 1987 20 | Juventus | 1–0 | Fiorentina | Torino |
| | Cabrini 54' | Report | | Stadium: Stadio Comunale; Referee: Longhi |

| 8 March 1987 21 | Fiorentina | 1–2 | Como 1907 | Florence |
| | Diaz 53' | Report | 2' Maccoppi; 77' Todesco | Stadium: Comunale; Referee: Boschi |

| 15 March 1987 22 | Hellas Verona | 2–2 | Fiorentina | Verona |
| | Elkjær 28'; Galia 47' | Report | 73' Diaz; 80' Antognoni | Stadium: Stadio Marcantonio Bentegodi; Referee: Pezzella |

| 22 March 1987 23 | Fiorentina | 2–2 | A.C. Milan | Florence |
| | C. Pin 49'; A. Di Chiara 70' | Report | 3' Galderisi; 28' (pen.) Virdis | Stadium: Comunale; Referee: Agnolin |

| 29 March 1987 24 | Fiorentina | 2–1 | Ascoli | Florence |
| | Berti 25'; Destro 64' (o.g.) | Report | 90' Scarafoni | Stadium: Comunale; Referee: Lo Bello |

| 5 April 1987 25 | Roma | 1–1 | Fiorentina | Rome |
| | Boniek 76' (pen.) | Report | 7' Diaz | Stadium: Stadio Olimpico; Referee: Pieri |

| 12 April 1987 26 | Fiorentina | 1–1 | Empoli F.C. | Florence |
| | Antognoni 20' | Report | 73' (pen.) Casaroli | Stadium: Comunale; Referee: Pietro D'Elia |

| 26 April 1987 27 | Inter | 1–0 | Fiorentina | Milan |
| | Ciocci 72' | Report | | Stadium: Giuseppe Meazza; Referee: Tullio Lanese |

| 3 May 1987 28 | Fiorentina | 0–0 | Torino | Florence |
| | | Report | | Stadium: Comunale; Referee: Carlo Longhi |

| 10 May 1987 29 | S.S.C. Napoli | 1–1 | Fiorentina | Naples |
| | A. Carnevale 29' | Report | 39' Baggio | Stadium: San Paolo; Referee: Pierluigi Pairetto |

| 17 May 1987 30 | Fiorentina | 1–0 | Atalanta B.C. | Florence |
| | A. Di Chiara 89' | Report | | Stadium: Comunale; Referee: Tullio Lanese |

=== Coppa Italia ===
==== First round ====
| 24 August 1986 1 | Casertana | 1–0 | Fiorentina | Caserta |
| | Petriello 57' | | | Stadium: Alberto Pinto; Referee: Angelo Amendolia |

| 27 August 1986 2 | Pescara | 0–0 | Fiorentina | Pescara |
| | | | | Stadium: Adriatico; Referee: Alberto Boschi |

| 31 August 1986 3 | Fiorentina | 1–1 | Arezzo | Florence |
| | Monelli 67' | | 58' Mangoni | Stadium: Comunale; Referee: Paolo Casarin |

| 3 September 1986 4 | Fiorentina | 2–1 | Empoli F.C. | Florence |
| | Baggio 55', 63' | | 58' Casaroli | Stadium: Comunale; Referee: Carlo Longhi |

| 7 September 1986 5 | Como 1907 | 1–1 | Fiorentina | Bologna |
| | Notaristefano 33' | | 5' C. Pin | Stadium: Renato Dall'Ara; Referee: Agnolin |

=== UEFA Cup ===
==== Round of 32 ====
| 17 September 1986 1 | Fiorentina | 1–0 | Boavista | Florence |
| | C. Pin 32' | | | Stadium: Comunale; Referee: (Austria) Horst Brummeier |

| 2 October 1986 2 | Boavista | 1–0 (a.e.t.) (3–1 p) | Fiorentina | Porto |
| | Nelson 8' | | | Stadium: Stadio do Bessa Século XXI; Referee: (Netherlands) Jan Keizer |
| | Penalties |
| | Agatao (penalty scored); Caetano (penalty scored); Tonanha (penalty scored) | | (penalty scored) Monelli; (penalty missed) Diaz; (penalty missed) A. Maldera; (penalty missed) Onorati |

== Statistics ==
=== Players statistics ===
| No. | Pos | Nat | Player | Total | | Serie A | | Coppa Italia | | UEFA Cup | |
| No. | Pos | Nat | Player | Apps | Goals | Apps | Goals | Apps | Goals | Apps | Goals |
|---|---|---|---|---|---|---|---|---|---|---|---|
| | GK | (Italy) ITA | Landucci | 37 | -40 | 30 | -35 | 5 | -4 | 2 | -1 |
| | DF | (Italy) ITA | Oriali | 32 | 1 | 25 | 1 | 5 | 0 | 2 | 0 |
| | DF | (Italy) ITA | Contratto | 30 | 1 | 25 | 1 | 3 | 0 | 2 | 0 |
| | DF | (Italy) ITA | Galbiati | 30 | 0 | 24+1 | 0 | 3 | 0 | 2 | 0 |
| | DF | (Italy) ITA | Gentile | 29 | 0 | 21+1 | 0 | 5 | 0 | 2 | 0 |
| | MF | (Italy) ITA | Pin | 36 | 3 | 29 | 1 | 5 | 1 | 2 | 1 |
| | MF | (Italy) ITA | Onorati | 29 | 0 | 16+7 | 0 | 4 | 0 | 2 | 0 |
| | MF | (Italy) ITA | Battistini | 26 | 1 | 19+2 | 1 | 5 | 0 | 0 | 0 |
| | MF | (Italy) ITA | Antognoni | 19 | 4 | 17+2 | 4 | 0 | 0 | 0 | 0 |
| | MF | (Italy) ITA | Berti | 31 | 4 | 24+3 | 4 | 3 | 0 | 1 | 0 |
| | FW | (Argentina) ARG | Diaz | 35 | 10 | 29 | 10 | 4 | 0 | 2 | 0 |
| | GK | (Italy) ITA | Conti | 0 | 0 | 0 | 0 | 0 | -0 | 0 | -0 |
| | FW | (Italy) ITA | Monelli | 31 | 3 | 15+9 | 2 | 5 | 1 | 2 | 0 |
| | DF | (Italy) ITA | Di Chiara | 30 | 2 | 15+9 | 2 | 5 | 0 | 1 | 0 |
| | DF | (Italy) ITA | Carobbi | 17 | 0 | 12 | 0 | 3 | 0 | 2 | 0 |
| | MF | (Italy) ITA | Maldera | 20 | 0 | 10+5 | 0 | 4 | 0 | 1 | 0 |
| | DF | (Italy) ITA | Rocchigiani | 14 | 0 | 8+4 | 0 | 2 | 0 | 0 | 0 |
| | MF | (Italy) ITA | Gelsi | 9 | 0 | 8+1 | 0 | 0 | 0 | 0 | 0 |
| | FW | (Italy) ITA | Baggio | 10 | 3 | 4+1 | 1 | 4 | 2 | 1 | 0 |
| | DF | (Italy) ITA | Fabiani | 1 | 0 | 0+1 | 0 | 0 | 0 | 0 | 0 |
| | FW | (Italy) ITA | Campioli | 1 | 0 | 0+1 | 0 | 0 | 0 | 0 | 0 |
| | MF | (Italy) ITA | Iorio | 3 | 0 | 0 | 0 | 3 | 0 | 0 | 0 |
| | MF | (Italy) ITA | Sereni | 0 | 0 | 0 | 0 | 0 | 0 | 0 | 0 |
| | MF | (Italy) ITA | Nardi | 0 | 0 | 0 | 0 | 0 | 0 | 0 | 0 |
| | MF | (Italy) ITA | Strano | 0 | 0 | 0 | 0 | 0 | 0 | 0 | 0 |
| | FW | (Italy) ITA | D. Pellegrini | 0 | 0 | 0 | 0 | 0 | 0 | 0 | 0 |

- Source: http://calcio-seriea.net/presenze/1986/931/

== Bibliografia ==
- Arrigo Beltrami, ed. (1987). "Almanacco illustrato del calcio 1988". Modena: Arrigo Beltrami. Edizioni Panini. pp. 136–626.
