= 1987–88 AC Fiorentina season =

Fiorentina
1987–88 season
- President: Lorenzo Righetti
- Manager: Sven-Göran Eriksson
- Stadium: Comunale
- Serie A: 8th
- Coppa Italia: Round of 16
- Top goalscorer: Ramón Díaz (7)
Home colours	Away colours

A.C. Fiorentina had its first season under Swedish coach Sven-Göran Eriksson, posting a stable mid-table season. Eriksson's compatriot Glenn Hysén arrived from UEFA Cup champions IFK Göteborg, the centre half becoming a crucial player for La Viola. Starlet Roberto Baggio finally got his breakthrough, scoring six league goals.

== Squad ==
Note: Flags indicate national team as defined under FIFA eligibility rules; some limited exceptions apply. Players may hold more than one non-FIFA nationality.

Pos.	Nation	Player
GK	ITA	Paolo Conti
GK	ITA	Marco Landucci
GK	ITA	Alessandro Misefori
DF	ITA	Stefano Carobbi
DF	ITA	Renzo Contratto
DF	SWE	Glenn Hysén
DF	ITA	Ernesto Calisti
DF	ITA	Celeste Pin
DF	ITA	Andrea Rocchigiani
MF	ITA	Simone Sereni
MF	ITA	Sergio Battistini

Pos.	Nation	Player
MF	ITA	Roberto Bosco
MF	ITA	Nicola Berti
MF	ITA	Roberto Onorati
MF	ITA	Roberto Gelsi
MF	ITA	Alberto Di Chiara
FW	ITA	Paolo Ciucchi
FW	ITA	Roberto Baggio
FW	ITA	Fabio Graccaneli
FW	ARG	Ramón Díaz
FW	ITA	Davide Pellegrini
FW	ITA	Stefano Rebonato

=== Transfers ===
In
Pos.	Name	from	Type
DF	Glenn Hysén	IFK Göteborg	-
MF	Roberto Bosco	Pescara	-
FW	Davide Pellegrini	Pisa	loan ended
DF	Ernesto Calisti	SS Lazio	-

Out
Pos.	Name	To	Type
DF	Roberto Galbiati		retired
DF	Claudio Gentile	Piacenza	-
DF	Aldo Maldera		retired
MF	Giancarlo Antognoni		retired
MF	Gabriele Oriali		end of contract
FW	Paolo Monelli	SS Lazio	-

== Competitions ==
=== Serie A ===
==== League table ====
Pos	Team	Pld	W	D	L	GF	GA	GD	Pts	Qualification or relegation
6	Juventus (Note: Juventus won the UEFA Cup qualification match against Torino 0–0*(4:2) then qualified to 1988–89 UEFA Cup.)	30	11	9	10	35	30	+5	31	Qualification to UEFA Cup
7	Torino	30	8	15	7	33	30	+3	31	
8	Fiorentina	30	9	10	11	29	33	−4	28	
9	Cesena	30	7	12	11	23	32	−9	26	
10	Hellas Verona	30	7	11	12	23	30	−7	25	

Source: 1987–88 Serie A, RSSSF.com
Rules for classification: 1) Points; 2) Head-to-head points; 3) Head-to-head goal difference; 4) Goal difference; 5) Goals scored; 6) Draw.

==== Results by round ====
Round	1	2	3	4	5	6	7	8	9	10	11	12	13	14	15	16	17	18	19	20	21	22	23	24	25	26	27	28	29	30
Ground	H	A	H	A	H	A	H	A	H	A	H	A	H	A	H	A	H	A	H	A	H	A	H	A	H	A	H	A	H	A
Result	D	W	D	D	W	L	W	L	D	L	L	L	W	L	D	L	D	L	D	D	W	D	W	L	D	L	W	L	W	W
Position	7	3	3	5	2	6	4	6	5	6	9	9	9	10	10	11	10	11	11	11	9	10	9	9	10	10	9	9	8	8

Source: Competitive matches
A = Away; H = Home; W = Win; D = Draw; L = Loss; = 1988–89 European Cup; = 1988–89 UEFA Cup; = 1988–89 Serie B

==== Matches ====
13 September 1987 1	Fiorentina	0–0	Verona	Florence
		Report		Stadium: Stadio Comunale; Referee: Romeo Paparesta

20 September 1987 2	Milan	0–2	Fiorentina	Milan
	Tassotti (yellow card) 75'	Report	Díaz (yellow card) 22', (goal) 76'; R. Baggio 78'	Stadium: Stadio San Siro; Attendance: 74,880; Referee: Pietro D'Elia

27 September 1987 3	Fiorentina	1–1	Como	Florence
	Díaz 36'	Report	Annoni 76'	Stadium: Stadio Comunale; Referee: Carlo Sguizzato

4 October 1987 4	Empoli	0–0	Fiorentina	Empoli
		Report		Stadium: Stadio Carlo Castellani; Referee: Tullio Lanese

11 October 1987 5	Fiorentina	2–1	Avellino	Florence
	Amodio 9' (o.g.); D. Pellegrini 38'	Report	Schachner 82'	Stadium: Stadio Comunale; Referee: Pierluigi Pairetto

25 October 1987 6	Torino	2–1	Fiorentina	Turin
	Polster 22', 67'	Report	R. Baggio 72' (pen.)	Stadium: Stadio Comunale; Referee: Salvatore Lombardo

1 November 1987 7	Fiorentina	4–0	Pescara	Florence
	Hysén 20'; D. Pellegrini 23'; Díaz 45'; Carobbi 71'	Report		Stadium: Stadio Comunale; Referee: Carlo Longhi

8 November 1987 8	Cesena	1–0	Fiorentina	Cesena
	Di Bartolomei 60' (pen.)	Report		Stadium: Stadio Dino Manuzzi; Referee: Angelo Amendolia

22 November 1987 9	Fiorentina	1–1	Sampdoria	Florence
	A. Paganin 33' (o.g.)	Report	Cerezo 37'	Stadium: Stadio Comunale

29 November 1987 10	Pisa	2–1	Fiorentina	Pisa
	Paciocco 19'; Lucarelli 64'	Report	R. Baggio 42'; D. Pellegrini (red card) 89'	Stadium: Arena Garibaldi; Referee: Pierluigi Magni

13 December 1987 11	Fiorentina	1–2	Internazionale	Florence
	Berti 6'	Report	Passarella 36' (pen.); Ciocci 84'	Stadium: Stadio Comunale; Referee: Luigi Agnolin

20 December 1987 12	Ascoli	3–0	Fiorentina	Ascoli Piceno
	Giovannelli 43' (pen.), 64' (pen.); Casagrande 58'	Report		Stadium: Stadio Cino e Lillo Del Duca; Referee: Romeo Paparesta

3 January 1988 13	Fiorentina	1–0	Roma	Florence
	Collovati 43' (o.g.); Contratto (red card) 65'	Report		Stadium: Stadio Comunale; Referee: Tullio Lanese

10 January 1988 14	Napoli	4–0	Fiorentina	Naples
	Giordano 3', 74'; Careca 33'; Maradona 35'	Report		Stadium: Stadio San Paolo; Referee: Fabio Baldas

17 January 1988 15	Fiorentina	1–1	Juventus	Florence
	Rebonato 58'	Report	De Agostini 19'	Stadium: Stadio Comunale; Referee: Paolo Casarin

24 January 1988 16	Verona	1–0	Fiorentina	Verona
	Pacione 43'	Report		Stadium: Stadio Marc'Antonio Bentegodi; Referee: Pierluigi Magni

31 January 1988 17	Fiorentina	1–1	Milan	Florence
	Di Chiara 49', (yellow card) 81'; Bosco (yellow card) 53'; Battistini (yellow card) 72'	Report	Mussi (yellow card) 21'; Virdis (yellow card) 39' (yellow-red card) 72'; Baresi 74' (pen.)	Stadium: Stadio Comunale; Attendance: 52,068; Referee: Romeo Paparesta

7 February 1988 18	Como	1–0	Fiorentina	Como
	Corneliusson 70'	Report		Stadium: Stadio Giuseppe Sinigaglia; Referee: Salvatore Lombardo

14 February 1988 19	Fiorentina	0–0	Empoli	Florence
		Report		Stadium: Stadio Comunale; Referee: Arcangelo Pezzella

28 February 1988 20	Avellino	1–1	Fiorentina	Avellino
	Schachner 36' (pen.)	Report	D. Pellegrini 33'	Stadium: Stadio Partenio; Referee: Carlo Longhi

6 March 1988 21	Fiorentina	1–0	Torino	Florence
	Díaz 90' (pen.)	Report		Stadium: Stadio Comunale; Referee: Werter Cornieti

13 March 1988 22	Pescara	1–1	Fiorentina	Pescara
	Gasperini 4'; Slišković (penalty missed) 55'	Report	R. Baggio 88' (pen.)	Stadium: Stadio Adriatico; Referee: Arcangelo Pezzella

20 March 1988 23	Fiorentina	3–1	Cesena	Florence
	Battistini 13'; Díaz 16'; Leoni 33' (o.g.)	Report	Lorenzo 47'	Stadium: Stadio Comunale; Referee: Moreno Frigerio

27 March 1988 24	Sampdoria	1–0	Fiorentina	Genoa
	Bonomi 57' (pen.)	Report		Stadium: Stadio Luigi Ferraris; Referee: Carlo Sguizzato

10 April 1988 25	Fiorentina	0–0	Pisa	Florence
		Report		Stadium: Stadio Comunale; Referee: Arcangelo Pezzella

17 April 1988 26	Internazionale	3–0	Fiorentina	Milan
	Minaudo 47'; Piraccini 84'; Ciocci 87'	Report		Stadium: Stadio Giuseppe Meazza; Referee: Bruno Di Cola

24 April 1988 27	Fiorentina	1–0	Ascoli	Florence
	R. Baggio 19'	Report		Stadium: Stadio Comunale; Referee: Pierluigi Pairetto

1 May 1988 28	Roma	2–1	Fiorentina	Rome
	Giannini 32', 39'	Report	Rebonato 76'	Stadium: Stadio Olimpico; Referee: Mauro Felicani

8 May 1988 29	Fiorentina	3–2	Napoli	Florence
	Di Chiara 9'; Díaz 58', 72'; Berti (red card) 75'	Report	Ferrara 24'; Renica 90'	Stadium: Stadio Comunale; Referee: Carlo Longhi

15 May 1988 30	Juventus	1–2	Fiorentina	Turin
	De Agostini 78' (pen.)	Report	R. Baggio 32'; Di Chiara 75'	Stadium: Stadio Comunale; Referee: Paolo Casarin

=== Coppa Italia ===
==== First round ====
Pos	Team	Pld	W	PKW	PKL	L	GF	GA	GD	Pts
1	Napoli	5	5	0	0	0	11	1	+10	15
2	Fiorentina	5	4	0	0	1	8	3	+5	12
3	Livorno	5	2	0	1	2	5	6	−1	7
4	Udinese	5	1	1	0	3	4	6	−2	5
5	Padova	5	0	1	2	2	2	4	−2	4
6	Modena	5	0	1	0	4	1	11	−10	2

==== Results ====
23 August 1987 1	Padova	0–1	Fiorentina	Padua
			Diaz 74'	Stadium: Stadio Euganeo; Referee: Moreno Frigerio

26 August 1987 2	Fiorentina	2–0	Udinese	Florence
	R. Baggio 31' (pen.); Diaz 77'			Stadium: Stadio Comunale; Referee: Sergio Coppetelli

30 August 1987 3	Modena	0–2	Fiorentina	Modena
			Diaz 81'; D. Pellegrini 89'	Stadium: Stadio Alberto Braglia; Referee: Carlo Longhi

2 September 1987 4	Fiorentina	2–1	Livorno	Florence
	R. Baggio 21'; Diaz 23'		Protti 55'	Stadium: Stadio Comunale

6 September 1987 5	Napoli	2–1	Fiorentina	Naples
	Francini 5'; Maradona 51' (pen.)		R. Baggio 30' (pen.)	Stadium: Stadio San Paolo; Referee: Rosario Lo Bello

==== Round of 16 ====
6 January 1988 First leg	Napoli	2–3	Fiorentina	Naples
	Maradona 18' (pen.); Careca 57'		Carobbi 44'; Onorati 52'; Diaz 80'	Stadium: Stadio San Paolo; Referee: Werter Cornieti

20 January 1988 Second leg	Fiorentina	1–3 (4–5 agg.)	Napoli	Florence
	Di Chiara 33'		Carnevale 50', 81'; Renica 72'	Stadium: Stadio Comunale; Referee: Rosario Lo Bello

== Statistics ==
=== Players statistics ===
No.	Pos	Nat	Player	Total		1987–88 Serie A		1987–88 Coppa Italia	
No.	Pos	Nat	Player	Apps	Goals	Apps	Goals	Apps	Goals
	GK	(Italy) ITA	Marco Landucci	37	-41	30	-33	7	-8
	DF	(Italy) ITA	Stefano Carobbi	32	2	28	1	4	1
	DF	(Sweden) SWE	Glenn Hysén	36	1	30	1	6	0
	DF	(Italy) ITA	Renzo Contratto	30	0	23	0	7	0
	DF	(Italy) ITA	Alberto Di Chiara	35	4	28	3	7	1
	MF	(Italy) ITA	Roberto Onorati	33	1	25+1	0	7	1
	MF	(Italy) ITA	Sergio Battistini	27	1	20	1	7	0
	MF	(Italy) ITA	Roberto Bosco	33	0	22+4	0	7	0
	MF	(Italy) ITA	Nicola Berti	28	1	25	1	3	0
	FW	(Argentina) ARG	Ramón Díaz	31	12	24	7	7	5
	FW	(Italy) ITA	Roberto Baggio	34	9	26+1	6	7	3
	GK	(Italy) ITA	Paolo Conti	0	0	0	-0	0	-0
	FW	(Italy) ITA	Davide Pellegrini	31	4	18+7	3	6	1
	DF	(Italy) ITA	Celeste Pin	24	0	14+5	0	5	0
	DF	(Italy) ITA	Ernesto Calisti	14	0	8+5	0	1	0
	FW	(Italy) ITA	Stefano Rebonato	18	2	6+11	2	1	0
	MF	(Italy) ITA	Roberto Gelsi	10	0	3+2	0	5	0
	FW	(Italy) ITA	Paolo Ciucchi	5	0	0+5	0	0	0
	MF	(Italy) ITA	Simone Sereni	2	0	0+2	0	0	0
	GK	(Italy) ITA	Alessandro Misefori	0	0	0	-0	0	-0
	DF	(Italy) ITA	Andrea Rocchigiani	0	0	0	0	0	0
	FW	(Italy) ITA	Vignini	0	0	0	0		
	DF	(Italy) ITA	Massimo Paganin	0	0	0	0	0	0

- Source: http://calcio-seriea.net/presenze/1987/952/

=== Topscorers ===
- (Argentina) Ramón Díaz 12 (1)
- (Italy) Roberto Baggio 9 (4)
- (Italy) Davide Pellegrini 4
- (Italy) Alberto Di Chiara 4
