= 1985–86 AC Fiorentina season =

AC Fiorentina
1985-1986 season
- President: Ranieri Pontello
- Manager: Aldo Agroppi
- Stadium: Comunale
- Serie A: 4th (in UEFA Cup)
- Coppa Italia: Semi-finals
- Top goalscorer: League: Daniel Passarella (11); All: Daniel Passarella (15)
Home colours	Away colours

During the 1985–1986 season AC Fiorentina competed in Serie A and Coppa Italia.

== Summary ==
The club appointed Aldo Agroppi as its manager for the campaign, reaching the 5th spot in League; Most of the points were clinched at Comunale. The squad could defeat the Big Three: Milan, Inter Milan and Juventus during the season.

Owing to injuries new acquisition (€1.39 million paid to Vicenza) youngster playmaker Roberto Baggio could not play in Serie A being called for the bench for only three times and, during May played only five matches in Coppa Italia. Other new arrivals to the club were: midfielder Nicola Berti, Sergio Battistini, Maurizio Iorio, Aldo Maldera, Onorati, Gelsi and Labardi.

During April Dutch forward Marco van Basten from Ajax signed with the team a three-year-agreement (until 1989), however, the transfer in was not completed due to the arrival of a new chairman Piercesare Baretti who did not give the green light to the contract.

Meanwhile in Coppa Italia the squad reached the Semifinals stage being defeated by future Champion AS Roma after two legs. Argentine Defender Daniel Passarella was the season topscorer with 15 goals.

After six years, Chairman Ranieri Pontello left the club during June.

== Squad ==
Note: Flags indicate national team as defined under FIFA eligibility rules; some limited exceptions apply. Players may hold more than one non-FIFA nationality.

Pos.	Nation	PlayerSOCRATES
GK	ITA	Giovanni Galli
GK	ITA	Paolo Conti
DF	ITA	Stefano Carobbi
DF	ITA	Renzo Contratto
DF	ITA	Claudio Gentile
DF	ITA	Gabriele Oriali
DF	ARG	Daniel Passarella
DF	ITA	Carlo Pascucci
DF	ITA	Celeste Pin
MF	ITA	Giancarlo Antognoni (Captain)
MF	ITA	Sergio Battistini

Pos.	Nation	Player
MF	ITA	Nicola Berti
MF	ITA	Michele Gelsi
MF	ITA	Aldo Maldera (III)
MF	ITA	Alberto Nardi
MF	ITA	Roberto Onorati
FW	ITA	Roberto Baggio
FW	ITA	Maurizio Iorio
FW	ITA	Roberto Labardi
FW	ITA	Daniele Massaro
FW	ITA	Paolo Monelli
FW	ITA	Davide Pellegrini

=== Transfers ===
In
Pos.	Name	from	Type
FW	Roberto Baggio	Vicenza	-
MF	Nicola Berti	Parma	-
DF	Sergio Battistini	Milan	-
MF	Maurizio Iorio	AS Roma	-
MF	Aldo Maldera	AS Roma	-

Out
Pos.	Name	To	Type
MF	Sócrates	Flamengo	
MF	Mario Bortolazzi	AC Milan	
MF	Leonardo Occhipinti	Cagliari	
MF	Eraldo Pecci	SSC Napoli	
FW	Luca Cecconi	Empoli	
FW	Paolino Pulici		retired
DF	Luca Moz		
DF	Carlo Pascucci		
MF	Massimo Mariotto		

==== Winter ====
In
Pos.	Name	from	Type

Out
Pos.	Name	To	Type
FW	Claudio Pellegrini	Palermo	loan
MF	Pasquale Iachini		

== Competitions ==
=== Serie A ===
==== League table ====
Pos	Team	Pld	W	D	L	GF	GA	GD	Pts	Qualification or relegation
3	Napoli	30	14	11	5	35	21	+14	39	Qualification to UEFA Cup
4	Torino	30	11	11	8	31	26	+5	33	Qualification to UEFA Cup
5	Fiorentina	30	10	13	7	29	23	+6	33	Qualification to UEFA Cup
6	Internazionale	30	12	8	10	36	33	+3	32	Qualification to UEFA Cup
7	Milan	30	10	11	9	26	24	+2	31	

Source: RSSSF.com
Rules for classification: 1) Points; 2) Head-to-head points; 3) Head-to-head goal difference; 4) Goal difference; 5) Goals scored; 6) Draw. (Note: Head-to-head record is used only after all the matches between the teams in question have been played).

==== Results by round ====
Round	1	2	3	4	5	6	7	8	9	10	11	12	13	14	15	16	17	18	19	20	21	22	23	24	25	26	27	28	29	30
Ground	H	A	H	H	A	H	A	A	H	A	H	A	H	A	H	A	H	A	A	H	A	H	H	A	H	A	H	A	H	A
Result	W	L	W	W	D	D	L	D	W	D	D	L	W	D	D	D	D	L	L	W	D	D	D	L	D	W	W	L	W	W
Position	1	6	3	2	2	3	6	5	5	5	5	6	4	4	5	4	5	6	7	6	7	7	7	7	7	6	5	6	4	5

Source: Competitive matches
A = Away; H = Home; W = Win; D = Draw; L = Loss; P = Postponed; = Leader, 1986–87 European Cup; = 1986–87 UEFA Cup

==== Matches ====
8 September 1985 1	Fiorentina	1–0	Sampdoria	Florence
	Massaro 75'	Report		Stadium: Comunale; Referee: Paolo Casarin

19 September 1985 2	Torino	2–1	Fiorentina	Turin
	Júnior 45'; Corradini 60'	Report	86' D. Pellegrini	Stadium: Comunale; Referee: Romeo Paparesta

22 September 1985 3	Fiorentina	2–0	A.C. Milan	Florence
	Passarella 21'; Monelli 43'	Report		Stadium: Comunale; Referee: Maurizio Mattei

29 September 1985 4	Fiorentina	3–1	Lecce	Florence
	Monelli 36', 45'; Passarella 83' (pen.)	Report	50' Palese	Stadium: Stadio Comunale; Referee: Giorgio Baldi

6 October 1985 5	Como	0–0	Fiorentina	Como
		Report		Stadium: Stadio Giuseppe Sinigaglia; Referee: Longhi

13 October 1985 6	Fiorentina	0–0	SSC Napoli	Florence
		Report		Stadium: Comunale; Referee: Lanese

20 October 1985 7	AS Roma	2–1	Fiorentina	Rome
	Cerezo 23', 76'	Report	46' Massaro	Stadium: Stadio Olimpico; Referee: Mattei

27 October 1985 8	Atalanta BC	0–0	Fiorentina	Bergamo
		Report		Stadium: Stadio Comunale; Referee: Lombardo

3 November 1985 9	Fiorentina	3–0	Inter Milan	Florence
	Passarella 27' (rig), 47'; Berti 45'	Report		Stadium: Comunale; Referee: Pieri

10 November 1985 10	Hellas Verona	2–2	Fiorentina	Verona
	Elkjær 2'; Briegel 56'	Report	12' Berti; 83' (rig) Passarella	Stadium: Stadio Marcantonio Bentegodi; Referee: Casarin

24 November 1985 11	Fiorentina	0–0	Bari	Florence
		Report		Stadium: Comunale; Referee: Coppetelli

1 December 1985 12	Juventus FC	1–0	Fiorentina	Turin
	Brio 12'	Report		Stadium: Stadio Comunale; Referee: Lombardo

1 December 1985 13	Fiorentina	1–0	Avellino	Florence
	Passarella 18' (rig)	Report		Stadium: Comunale; Referee: Boschi

15 December 1985 14	Udinese Calcio	2–2	Fiorentina	Udine
	Carnevale 3'; Storgato 44'	Report	39' Passarella; 81' Monelli	Stadium: Stadio Friuli; Referee: Pairetto

22 December 1985 15	Fiorentina	1–1	Pisa	Florence
	D. Pellegrini 40'	Report	79' Muro	Stadium: Comunale; Referee: Agnolin

5 January 1986 16	UC Sampdoria	2–2	Fiorentina	Genoa
	Lorenzo 9'; Francis 85'	Report	8' (aut) Bordon; 49' Iorio	Stadium: Stadio Luigi Ferraris; Referee: Longhi

12 January 1986 17	Fiorentina	0–0	Torino	Florence
		Report		Stadium: Comunale; Referee: Pezzella

19 January 1986 18	AC Milan	1–0	Fiorentina	Milan
	Virdis 61' (rig)	Report		Stadium: Stadio Giuseppe Meazza; Referee: Pieri

26 January 1986 19	Lecce	2–1	Fiorentina	Lecce
	Pasculli 67'; Di Chiara 85'	Report	8' Battistini	Stadium: Stadio Via del Mare; Referee: Sguizzato

9 February 1986 20	Fiorentina	1–0	Como	Florence
	Passarella 52'	Report		Stadium: Comunale; Referee: Agnolin

16 February 1986 21	SSC Napoli	0–0	Fiorentina	Naples
		Report		Stadium: Stadio San Paolo; Referee: Lo Bello

23 February 1986 22	Fiorentina	1–1	AS Roma	Florence
	Boniek 57' (aut)	Report	22' Pruzzo	Stadium: Comunale; Referee: Mattei

2 March 1986 23	Fiorentina	0–0	Atalanta BC	Florence
		Report		Stadium: Comunale; Referee: Pairetto

9 March 1986 24	Inter	2–0	Fiorentina	Milan
	Altobelli 28'; Altobelli 73'	Report		Stadium: Stadio Giuseppe Meazza; Referee: Lanese

16 March 1986 25	Fiorentina	0–0	Hellas Verona	Florence
		Report		Stadium: Comunale; Referee: Boschi

23 March 1986 26	Bari	0–1	Fiorentina	Bari
		Report	7' (rig) Monelli	Stadium: Stadio della Vittoria; Referee: Agnolin

6 April 1986 27	Fiorentina	2–0	Juventus	Florence
	Passarella 57'; Berti 90'	Report		Stadium: Comunale; Referee: Casarin

13 April 1986 28	Avellino	3–1	Fiorentina	Avellino
	Díaz 25'; Benedetti 65'; Alessio 80'	Report	57' Carobbi	Stadium: Stadio Partenio; Referee: Lombardo

20 April 1986 29	Fiorentina	1–0	Udinese Calcio	Florence
	Antognoni 77'	Report		Stadium: Comunale; Referee: Agnolin

27 April 1986 30	Pisa	1–2	Fiorentina	Pisa
	Muro 63'	Report	66' (rig), 76' Passarella	Stadium: Stadio Arena Garibaldi; Referee: Pieri

=== Coppa Italia ===
==== Group stage ====
===== Group 1 =====
Pos	Team	Pld	W	D	L	GF	GA	GD	Pts
1	Fiorentina (1)	5	4	1	0	9	2	+7	9
2	Juventus (1)	5	2	2	1	10	5	+5	6
3	Monza(2)	5	2	2	1	6	5	+1	6
4	Perugia(2)	5	1	2	2	3	3	0	4
5	Palermo(2)	5	2	0	3	5	10	−5	4
6	Casertana (3)	5	0	1	4	4	12	−8	1

21 August 1985 1	Monza	0–3	Fiorentina	Viareggio
			27' Iachini; 43' Massaro; 53' Battistini	Stadium: dei Pini; Referee: Liberato Esposito

25 August 1985 2	Fiorentina	1–0	Perugia Calcio	Florence
	Massaro 9'			Stadium: Comunale; Referee: Giorgio Baldi

28 August 1985 3	Palermo	1–3	Fiorentina	Palermo
	De Vitis 24'		16' Battistini; 37', 43' Iorio	Stadium: La Favorita; Referee: Maurizio Mattei

1 September 1985 4	Casertana	1–1	Fiorentina	Caserta
	Forte 10'		52' Passarella	Stadium: Alberto Pinto; Referee: Paolo Tubertini

4 September 1985 5	Fiorentina	1–0	Juventus	Florence
	Passarella 75' (pen.)			Stadium: Comunale; Referee: Pierluigi Magni

==== Eightfinals ====
29 January 1986 1	Fiorentina	3–1	Udinese	Florence
	Pin 37'; Passarella 48', 83'		20' Criscimanni	Stadium: Comunale; Referee: Pierluigi Pairetto

12 February 1986 2	Udinese	1–0 (2–3 agg.)	Fiorentina	Udine
	Chierico 45'			Stadium: Friuli; Referee: Pierluigi Magni

==== Quarterfinals ====
7 May 1986	Empoli F.C.	3–2	Fiorentina	Empoli
	Zennaro 72'; Cecconi 73'; Della Monica 89'		13' Maldera; 76' Battistini	Stadium: Carlo Castellani; Referee: Romeo Paparesta

21 May 1986 2	Fiorentina	3–0	Empoli F.C.	Florence
	Monelli 1' (pen.), 11'; Oriali 50'			Stadium: Comunale; Referee: Pierluigi Pairetto

==== Semifinals ====
28 May 1986 1	AS Roma	2–0	Fiorentina	Rome
	Righetti 15'; Tovalieri 18'			Stadium: Olimpico; Referee: Claudio Pieri

4 June 1986 2	Fiorentina	1–1 (1–3 agg.)	AS Roma	Florence
	Monelli 50'		45' Giannini	Stadium: Comunale; Referee: Tullio Lanese

== Statistics ==
=== Squad statistics ===
Competition	Points	Home						Away						Total						GD
Competition	Points	G	W	D	L	Gs	Ga	G	W	D	L	Gs	Ga	G	W	D	L	Gs	Ga	GD
Serie A	33	15	8	7	0	16	3	15	2	6	7	13	20	30	10	13	7	29	23	+6
Coppa Italia		5	4	1	0	9	2	6	2	1	3	9	8	11	6	2	3	18	10	+8
Total	-	20	12	8	0	25	5	21	4	7	10	22	28	41	16	15	10	47	33	+14

=== Players statistics ===
No.	Pos	Nat	Player	Total		1985-86 Serie A		1985-86 Coppa Italia	
No.	Pos	Nat	Player	Apps	Goals	Apps	Goals	Apps	Goals
	GK	(Italy) ITA	Galli	35	-26	28	-22	7	-4
	DF	(Italy) ITA	Carobbi	35	1	20+4	1	11	0
	DF	(Italy) ITA	Contratto	41	0	30	0	11	0
	DF	(Argentina) ARG	Passarella	36	15	29	11	7	4
	DF	(Italy) ITA	Pin	36	1	26+1	0	9	1
	MF	(Italy) ITA	Battistini	37	4	28	1	9	3
	MF	(Italy) ITA	Oriali	32	1	24+1	0	7	1
	MF	(Italy) ITA	Berti	37	3	24+4	3	9	0
	FW	(Italy) ITA	Iorio	29	3	21+4	1	4	2
	FW	(Italy) ITA	Monelli	40	8	26+4	5	10	3
	FW	(Italy) ITA	Massaro	36	4	26	2	10	2
	GK	(Italy) ITA	Conti	6	-6	2	-1	4	-5
	MF	(Italy) ITA	Antognoni	22	1	18+1	1	3	0
	DF	(Italy) ITA	Gentile	27	0	16+3	0	8	0
	MF	(Italy) ITA	Onorati	29	0	6+13	0	10	0
	MF	(Italy) ITA	Iachini	5	1	5	1		
	FW	(Italy) ITA	D. Pellegrini	24	2	4+14	2	6	0
	MF	(Italy) ITA	Maldera	12	1	1+2	0	9	1
	DF	(Italy) ITA	Pascucci	3	0	1+1	0	1	0
	MF	(Italy) ITA	Gelsi	1	0	0+1	0	0	0
	FW	(Italy) ITA	Labardi	1	0	0+1	0	0	0
	FW	(Italy) ITA	C. Pellegrini	3	0	0	0	3	0
	FW	(Italy) ITA	Baggio	5	0	0	0	2+3	0
	MF	(Italy) ITA	Nardi	1	0	0	0	1	0

- Source: http://calcio-seriea.net/presenze/1985/918/
