= 1986–87 Torino Calcio season =

Torino Calcio
1986–87 season
- President: Sergio Rossi
- Head Coach: Luigi Radice
- Serie A: 11th place
- Coppa Italia: Round of 16
- UEFA Cup: Round of 16
- Top goalscorer: League: Wim Kieft (8); All: Kieft (16)
- Highest home attendance: 48,123 vs. Juventus (April 26, 1987)
- Lowest home attendance: 19,111 vs. Atalanta (March 15, 1987)
- All statistics correct as of May 17, 1987.

== Season summary ==
In order to resolve a lack of goals Torino bought Wim Kieft, who hit the net for several times in every competition. At least in autumn the side paid European efforts, winning only once in Sundays following cup games.

As 1987 begins, UEFA draw coupled Tirol Innsbruck to the side for quarter-finals. First leg ended up in a 0–0 after a match poor of goal opportunities. Torino came to retour challenge in a crisis trend, missing league win from 5 games and goals from 554'. A cold ground, in Austria, hosted the match. Torino stood up at opponent's attacks, finishing the first half without scoring or conceding. As second round started, Tirol went on 1–0 after a quarter: a corner kick originated the goal. With 10 minutes left, Austrian side came to double. Referee was about to blow the end when Francini scored for Torino. The same defender came close to equalizer, but a foul on him was not punished with a penalty (probably because he hit the ball before falling down). European failure could have result in a sacking for Radice who – instead – retained his job.

== Squad ==
=== Goalkeepers ===
- (Italy) Silvano Martina
- (Italy) Renato Copparoni
- (Italy) Fabrizio Lorieri

=== Defenders ===
- (Italy) Paolo Beruatto
- (Italy) Giancarlo Corradini
- (Italy) Roberto Cravero
- (Italy) Giacomo Ferri
- (Italy) Giovanni Francini
- (Italy) Ezio Rossi

=== Midfielders ===
- (Italy) Paolo Bellatorre
- (Italy) Antonio Comi
- (Italy) Giuseppe Dossena
- (Italy) Diego Fuser
- (Brazil) Júnior
- (Italy) Gianluigi Lentini
- (Italy) Danilo Pileggi
- (Italy) Antonio Sabato
- (Italy) Renato Zaccarelli

=== Attackers ===
- (Italy) Franco Lerda
- (Italy) Pietro Mariani
- (Netherlands) Wim Kieft

== Competitions ==
=== Serie A ===
==== League table ====
| Pos | Team | Pld | W | D | L | GF | GA | GD | Pts |
|---|---|---|---|---|---|---|---|---|---|
| 9 | Como | 30 | 5 | 16 | 9 | 16 | 20 | −4 | 26 |
| 10 | Fiorentina | 30 | 8 | 10 | 12 | 30 | 35 | −5 | 26 |
| 11 | Torino | 30 | 8 | 10 | 12 | 26 | 32 | −6 | 26 |
| 12 | Ascoli | 30 | 7 | 10 | 13 | 18 | 33 | −15 | 24 |
| 13 | Empoli | 30 | 8 | 7 | 15 | 13 | 33 | −20 | 23 |

Source: 1986–87 Serie A, RSSSF.com
Rules for classification: 1) Points; 2) Head-to-head points; 3) Head-to-head goal difference; 4) Goal difference; 5) Goals scored; 6) Draw. (Note: Head-to-head record is used only after all the matches between the teams in question have been played).

==== Matches ====
| 14 September 1986 1 | Torino | 2–1 | Hellas Verona | Turin |
| 15:00 UTC+2 | Kieft 9' (pen.); Comi 72' | Report | 86' Galia | Stadium: Comunale; Attendance: 43,621; Referee: Longhi |

| 21 September 1986 2 | Como | 1–1 | Torino | Como |
| 15:00 UTC+2 | Notaristefano 71' (pen.) | Report | 49' Francini | Stadium: Giuseppe Sinigaglia; Attendance: 20,675; Referee: D'Elia |

| 28 September 1986 3 | Torino | 0–2 | Ascoli | Turin |
| 15:00 UTC+1 | | Report | 28' Greco; 83' Barbuti | Stadium: Comunale; Attendance: 24,073; Referee: Magni |

| 5 October 1986 4 | Napoli | 3–1 | Torino | Naples |
| 15:00 UTC+1 | Bagni 15'; Ferrara 60'; Giordano 76' | Report | 10' Sabato | Stadium: Stadio San Paolo; Attendance: 65,450; Referee: Lanese |

| 12 October 1986 5 | Torino | 1–0 | Empoli | Turin |
| 15:00 UTC+1 | Lerda 46' | Report | | Stadium: Comunale; Attendance: 19,931; Referee: Pezzella |

| 19 October 1986 6 | Torino | 0–2 | Roma | Turin |
| 15:00 UTC+1 | | Report | Berggreen 75'; Agostini 84' | Stadium: Comunale; Attendance: 27,117; Referee: Agnolin |

| 26 October 1986 7 | Atalanta | 0–2 | Torino | Bergamo |
| 15:00 UTC+1 | | Report | Comi 52'; Kieft 55' | Stadium: Comunale; Attendance: 21,776; Referee: Mattei |

| 2 November 1986 8 | Torino | 4–1 | Avellino | Turin |
| 14:30 UTC+1 | Kieft 3', 5', 44'; Francini 84' | Report | 58' Colantuono | Stadium: Comunale; Attendance: 23,804; Referee: Paparesta |

| 9 November 1986 9 | Inter Milan | 2–1 | Torino | Milan |
| 14:30 UTC+1 | Altobelli 5', 47' | Report | 75' Dossena | Stadium: Giuseppe Meazza; Attendance: 54,775; Referee: Bergamo |

| 23 November 1986 10 | Brescia | 2–0 | Torino | Brescia |
| 14:30 UTC+1 | Turchetta 66'; Bonometti 71' | Report | | Stadium: Mario Rigamonti; Attendance: 15 755; Referee: Mattei |

| 30 November 1986 11 | Torino | 0–0 | AC Milan | Turin |
| 14:30 UTC+1 | | Report | | Stadium: Comunale; Attendance: 36,766; Referee: Lombardo |

| 14 December 1986 12 | Juventus | 1–0 | Torino | Turin |
| 14:30 UTC+1 | Manfredonia 78' | Report | | Stadium: Comunale; Attendance: 48,906; Referee: Casarin (Milan) |

| 21 December 1986 13 | Torino | 2–1 | Fiorentina | Turin |
| 14:30 UTC+1 | Francini 5'; Cravero 63' | Report | 65' Antognoni | Stadium: Comunale; Attendance: 22,294; Referee: Longhi (Rome) |

| 4 January 1987 14 | Udinese | 1–1 | Torino | Udine |
| 14:30 UTC+1 | Collovati 67' | Report | 84' Cravero | Stadium: Stadio Friuli; Attendance: 26,236; Referee: Coppetelli (Tivoli) |

| 11 January 1987 15 | Torino | 2–0 | Sampdoria | Turin |
| 14:30 UTC+1 | Comi 14' (pen.); Corradini 19' | Report | | Stadium: Comunale; Attendance: 22,037; Referee: Lombardo (Marsala) |

| 18 January 1987 16 | Hellas Verona | 2–1 | Torino | Verona |
| 14:30 UTC+1 | Elkjaer 53'; P. Rossi 87' | Report | 76' Pileggi | Stadium: Stadio Marcantonio Bentegodi; Attendance: 28,661; Referee: Bergamo (Livorno) |

| 1 February 1987 17 | Torino | 1–0 | Como | Turin |
| 15:00 UTC+1 | Dossena 43' | Report | | Stadium: Comunale; Attendance: 22,463; Referee: Pezzella (Frattamaggiore) |

| 8 February 1987 18 | Ascoli | 1–1 | Torino | Ascoli Piceno |
| 15:00 UTC+1 | Barbuti 6' | Report | 76' Jùnior | Stadium: Stadio Cino e Lillo Del Duca; Attendance: 12.532; Referee: Paparesta (Bari) |

| 22 February 1987 19 | Torino | 0–1 | Napoli | Turin |
| 15:00 UTC+1 | | Report | 84' Giordano | Stadium: Comunale; Attendance: 46,615; Referee: Magni (Bergamo) |

| 1 March 1987 20 | Empoli | 2–0 | Torino | Empoli |
| 15:00 UTC+1 | Baiano 5'; Urbano 15' | Report | | Stadium: Stadio Carlo Castellani; Attendance: 9,478; Referee: Pieri (Genoa) |

| 8 March 1987 21 | Roma | 1–0 | Torino | Rome |
| 15:00 UTC+1 | Agostini 54' | Report | | Stadium: Stadio Olimpico; Attendance: 50,317; Referee: Redini (Pisa) |

| 15 March 1987 22 | Torino | 0–0 | Atalanta | Turin |
| 15:00 UTC+1 | | Report | | Stadium: Comunale; Attendance: 19,111; Referee: Longhi (Rome) |

| 22 March 1987 23 | Avellino | 0–0 | Torino | Avellino |
| 15:00 UTC+1 | | Report | | Stadium: Stadio Partenio; Attendance: 21,571; Referee: Baldas (Trieste) |

| 29 March 1987 24 | Torino | 0–0 | Inter Milan | Turin |
| 15:00 UTC+2 | | Report | | Stadium: Comunale; Attendance: 34,823; Referee: Bergamo (Livorno) |

| 5 April 1987 25 | Torino | 2–2 | Brescia | Turin |
| 15:00 UTC+2 | Ceramicola 12' (o.g.); Mariani 55' | Report | 24' Occhipinti; 81' Ceramicola | Stadium: Comunale; Attendance: 21,168; Referee: Agnolin (Bassano del Grappa) |

| 12 April 1987 26 | AC Milan | 1–0 | Torino | Milan |
| 15:00 UTC+2 | Hateley 30' | Report | | Stadium: Stadio Giuseppe Meazza; Attendance: 58,812; Referee: Redini (Pisa) |

| 26 April 1987 27 | Torino | 1–1 | Juventus | Turin |
| 15:00 UTC+2 | Cravero 86' | Report | 56' Brio | Stadium: Comunale; Attendance: 48,123; Referee: Bergamo (Livorno) |

| 3 May 1987 28 | Fiorentina | 0–0 | Torino | Florence |
| 15:00 UTC+2 | | Report | | Stadium: Stadio Comunale; Attendance: 29,441; Referee: Longhi (Rome) |

| 10 May 1987 29 | Torino | 3–1 | Udinese | Turin |
| 15:00 UTC+2 | Kieft 51', 58', 86' | Report | 28' Pasa | Stadium: Comunale; Attendance: 19,117; Referee: Di Cola (Avezzano) |

| 17 May 1987 30 | Sampdoria | 3–0 | Torino | Genoa |
| 16:00 UTC+2 | Vialli 39'; Briegel 74'; Mannini 86' | Report | | Stadium: Stadio Luigi Ferraris; Attendance: 23,879; Referee: Luci (Florence) |

==== Topscorers ====
8 goals: (Netherlands) Wim Kieft

=== Coppa Italia ===
First round

| 24 August 1986 1 | Cagliari | 2–2 | Torino | Cagliari |
| 20:30 UTC+2 | Maritozzi 12'; Bergamaschi 17' | | 15' Comi; 83' Kieft | Stadium: Sant'Elia; Referee: Magni |

| 27 August 1986 2 | Torino | 1–0 | Siena | Turin |
| 20:30 UTC+2 | Kieft 45' (pen.) | | | Stadium: Comunale; Attendance: 15 000; Referee: Gava |

| 31 August 1986 3 | Modena | 0–0 | Torino | Modena |
| 20:45 UTC+2 | | | | Stadium: Alberto Braglia; Referee: Paparesta |

| 3 September 1986 4 | Pisa | 0–2 | Torino | Pisa |
| 20:30 UTC+2 | | | Comi 51' (pen.); Dossena 61' | Stadium: Arena Garibaldi; Referee: Coppetelli |

| 7 September 1986 5 | Torino | 1–1 | Avellino | Turin |
| 20:30 UTC+2 | Kieft 29' (pen.) | | Colomba 71' (pen.) | Stadium: Comunale; Referee: Baldi |

Eightfinals

| 25 February 1987 | Cagliari | 1–0 | Torino | Cagliari |
| 20:00 UTC+1 | Maritozzi 27' | | | Stadium: Sant'Elia; Referee: Fabricatore |

| 8 April 1987 | Torino | 0–0 | Cagliari | Turin |
| 20:30 UTC+2 | | | | Stadium: Comunale; Attendance: 7 202; Referee: Frigerio |

=== UEFA Cup ===
First round

| 17 September 1986 | (France) Nantes | 0–4 | Torino | Nantes |
| 19:45 UTC+2 | | | Comi 55'; Beruatto 62'; Kieft 82'; Kieft 89' | Stadium: La Beaujoire; Attendance: 23 799; Referee: (Scotland) Syme |

| 1O October 1986 | Torino | 1–1 | (France) Nantes | Turin |
| 20:30 UTC+1 | Kieft 48' (pen.) | | Anziani 66' | Stadium: Comunale; Attendance: 33 376; Referee: (England) Hackett |

Second round

| 22 October 1986 | Torino | 4–0 | (Hungary) Raba ETO | Turin |
| 19:00 UTC+1 | Kieft 26', 36'; Dossena 40'; Comi 75' | | | Stadium: Comunale; Attendance: 27 405; Referee: (Portugal) Dos Santos |

| 5 November 1986 | (Hungary) Raba ETO | 1–1 | Torino | Győr |
| 18:00 UTC+1 | Somogyi 15' | | 19' Comi | Stadium: Stadio ETO; Referee: (Netherlands) Keizer |

Eightfinals

| 26 November 1986 | Torino | 2–1 | (Belgium) K.S.K. Beveren | Turin |
| 20:30 UTC+1 | Comi 47' (pen.); E. Rossi 58' | | 84' Fairclough | Stadium: Comunale; Referee: (East Germany) Prokop |

| 10 December 1986 | (Belgium) K.S.K. Beveren | 0–1 | Torino | Beveren |
| 17:30 UTC+1 | | | Dossena 75' | Stadium: Freethiel Stadion; Referee: (Austria) Wöhrer |

Quarterfinals

| 4 March 1987 | Torino | 0–0 | (Austria) Tirol Innsbruck | Turin |
| 20:45 UTC+1 | | | | Stadium: Comunale; Attendance: 40 557; Referee: (Belgium) Ponnet |

| 18 March 1987 | (Austria) Tirol Innsbruck | 2–1 | Torino | Innsbruck |
| 19:00 UTC+1 | Müller 60'; Pacult 78' | | Francini 86' | Stadium: Tivoli; Attendance: 17 500; Referee: (Sweden) Fredriksson |
