= 1984–85 Torino Calcio season =

Torino Calcio
1984–85 season
- President: Sergio Rossi
- Head Coach: Luigi Radice
- Serie A: 2nd place
- Coppa Italia: Quarter finals
- Top goalscorer: League: Aldo Serena (9); All: Leo Junior (10)
- Highest home attendance: 58,602 vs. Juventus (18 November 1984)
- Lowest home attendance: 17,546 vs. Cremonese (27 January 1985)
Home colours	Away colours
- All statistics correct as of 19 June 1985.

In the 1984–85 season, Torino Calcio competed in Serie A.

== Season summary ==
In attempt to reborn, Torino bet on Brazilian playmaker Leo Junior. On 18 November, a goal by Aldo Serena – who scored during injury time – brought the win in citizen derby. A week later, "Toro" was knocked out by Hellas Verona that, due to this win, couldn't top the league.

Whilst Hellas would eventually win title, Radice's side managed to get a second place useful to participate in UEFA Cup for 1985–86 season.

== Squad ==
=== Goalkeepers ===
- (Italy) Silvano Martina
- (Italy) Renato Copparoni

=== Defenders ===
- (Italy) Paolo Beruatto
- (Italy) Giancarlo Corradini
- (Italy) Luigi Danova
- (Italy) Giovanni Francini
- (Italy) Roberto Galbiati

=== Midfielders ===
- (Italy) Domenico Caso
- (Italy) Antonio Comi
- (Italy) Giuseppe Dossena
- (Italy) Giacomo Ferri
- (Brazil) Júnior
- (Italy) Marco Osio
- (Italy) Silvio Picci
- (Italy) Danilo Pileggi
- (Italy) Claudio Sclosa
- (Italy) Renato Zaccarelli

=== Attackers ===
- (Italy) Pietro Mariani
- (Austria) Walter Schachner
- (Italy) Aldo Serena

== Competitions ==
=== Serie A ===
==== League table ====
Pos	Team	Pld	W	D	L	GF	GA	GD	Pts	Qualification or relegation
1	Hellas Verona (C)	30	15	13	2	42	19	+23	43	Qualification to European Cup
2	Torino	30	14	11	5	36	22	+14	39	Qualification to UEFA Cup
3	Internazionale	30	13	12	5	42	28	+14	38	Qualification to UEFA Cup
4	Sampdoria	30	12	13	5	36	21	+15	37	Qualification to Cup Winners' Cup
5	Milan	30	12	12	6	31	25	+6	36 (Note: Position defined by head-to-head points: Milan: 3 pts; Juventus: 1 pt.)	Qualification to UEFA Cup

Source: RSSSF.com
Rules for classification: 1) Points; 2) Head-to-head points; 3) Head-to-head goal difference; 4) Goal difference; 5) Goals scored; 6) Draw. (Note: Head-to-head record is used only after all the matches between the teams in question have been played).
(C) Champions

==== Matches ====
16 September 1984 1	Torino	1–0	Ascoli	Turin
16:00	Schachner 20'	Report		Stadium: Comunale; Attendance: 25 695; Referee: Leni

23 September 1984 2	Cremonese	2–1	Torino	Cremona
	Bonomi 3'; Nicoletti 24'	Report	Caso 41'	Stadium: Giovanni Zini; Attendance: 16,871; Referee: Mattei

30 September 1984 3	Torino	3–0	Napoli	Turin
15:00	Serena 1', 79'; Francini 57'	Report		Stadium: Comunale; Attendance: 51,743; Referee: Pieri

7 October 1984 4	Udinese	0–1	Torino	Udine
15:00		Report	Serena 31'	Stadium: Friuli; Attendance: 32,069; Referee: Redini (Pisa)

14 October 1984 5	Torino	1–1	Inter Milan	Turin
14:30 UTC+1	Serena 56'	Report	Bergomi 21'	Stadium: Comunale; Attendance: 50,487; Referee: Ballerini

21 October 1984 6	Torino	1–0	Lazio	Turin
14:30 UTC+1	Júnior 77' (pen.)	Report		Stadium: Comunale; Attendance: 26,706; Referee: Pieri

28 October 1984 7	Sampdoria	2–2	Torino	Genoa
14:30 UTC+1	Souness 20'; Francis 90'	Report	Galbiati 13'; Júnior 28'	Stadium: Luigi Ferraris; Attendance: 32,069; Referee: Paparesta

11 November 1984 8	Torino	2–0	AC Milan	Turin
14:30 UTC+1	Schachner 80'; Júnior 88'	Report		Stadium: Comunale; Attendance: 56,902; Referee: Pieri

18 November 1984 9	Juventus	1–2	Torino	Turin
14:30 UTC+1	Platini 14'	Report	Francini 48'; Serena 89'	Stadium: Comunale; Attendance: 64,770; Referee: Agnolin

25 November 1984 10	Torino	1–2	Verona	Turin
14:30 UTC+1	Dossena 24'	Report	Briegel 20'; Marangon 60'	Stadium: Comunale; Attendance: 49,725; Referee: Bergamo

2 December 1984 11	Avellino	1–3	Torino	Avellino
14:30 UTC+1	Amodio 61'	Report	Dossena 3', 72'; Júnior 33' (pen.)	Stadium: Partenio; Attendance: 27,585; Referee: Longhi

16 December 1984 12	Torino	3–1	Como	Turin
14:30 UTC+1	Serena 16'; Dossena 46'; Zaccarelli 57'	Report	Júnior 26' (o.g.)	Stadium: Comunale; Attendance: 25,913; Referee: Lombardo

23 December 1984 13	Atalanta	0–0	Torino	Bergamo
14:30 UTC+1		Report		Stadium: Comunale; Attendance: 34,552; Referee: Lanese

6 January 1985 14	Torino	2–2	Fiorentina	Turin
14:30	Dossena 17'; Júnior 61' (pen.)	Report	Pecci 52', 80'	Stadium: Comunale

13 January 1985 15	Roma	1–0	Torino	Rome
14:30 UTC+1	Pruzzo 38'	Report		Stadium: Olimpico; Attendance: 55,240; Referee: Bergamo

20 January 1985 16	Ascoli	2–2	Torino	Ascoli Piceno
	Cantarutti 35'; Dirceu 67'	Report	Schachner 62'; Sclosa 75'	Stadium: Cino e Lillo Del Duca; Attendance: 16,184; Referee: Lanese

27 January 1985 17	Torino	1–0	Cremonese	Turin
14:30 UTC+1	Corradini 6'	Report		Stadium: Comunale; Attendance: 25,730; Referee: Esposito

10 February 1985 18	Napoli	2–1	Torino	Naples
15:00 UTC+1	Maradona 23' (pen.); Caffarelli 49'	Report	Júnior 7'	Stadium: San Paolo; Attendance: 79,707; Referee: Redini

17 February 1985 19	Torino	1–0	Udinese	Turin
15:00 UTC+1	Schachner 79'	Report		Stadium: Comunale; Attendance: 24,534; Referee: Leni

24 February 1985 20	Inter Milan	1–1	Torino	Giuseppe Meazza
15:00 UTC+1	Collovati 28'	Report	Corradini 13'	Stadium: Milan; Attendance: 55,228; Referee: Lo Bello

3 March 1985 21	Lazio	0–0	Torino	Rome
15:00 UTC+1		Report		Stadium: Olimpico; Attendance: 27,446; Referee: D'Elia

10 March 1985 22	Torino	1–1	Sampdoria	Turin
	Júnior 21' (pen.)	Report	Corradini 62' (o.g.)	Stadium: Comunale; Attendance: 40,195; Referee: Longhi

24 March 1985 23	AC Milan	0–1	Torino	Milan
		Report	Schachner 61'	Stadium: San Siro; Attendance: 64,911; Referee: Lo Bello

31 March 1985 24	Torino	0–2	Juventus	Turin
		Report	Briaschi 11'; Platini 87' (pen.)	Stadium: Comunale; Attendance: 58,602; Referee: Bergamo

14 April 1985 25	Hellas Verona	1–2	Torino	Verona
15:30 UTC+2	Briegel 77'	Report	Serena 53'; Schachner 65'	Stadium: Marcantonio Bentegodi; Attendance: 42,794; Referee: Lombardo

21 April 1985 26	Torino	2–0	Avellino	Turin
	Serena 13'; Schachner 88'	Report		Stadium: Comunale; Attendance: 29,051; Referee: Ballerini

28 April 1985 27	Como	0–0	Torino	Como
15:30UTC+2		Report		Stadium: Giuseppe Sinigaglia; Attendance: 17,700; Referee: Bianciardi

5 May 2019 28	Torino	0–0	Atalanta	Turin
16:00 UTC+2		Report		Stadium: Comunale; Attendance: 27,169; Referee: Baldi

12 May 1985 29	Fiorentina	0–0	Torino	Florence
16:00 UTC+2		Report		Stadium: Comunale; Attendance: 40,676; Referee: Lombardo

19 May 1985 30	Torino	1–0	Roma	Turin
16:00 UTC+2	Serena 79'	Report		Stadium: Comunale; Attendance: 34,807; Referee: Sguizzato

==== Topscorers ====
- (Italy) Aldo Serena 9
- (Brazil) Júnior 7
- (Austria) Walter Schachner 7
- (Italy) Giovanni Francini 2

=== Coppa Italia ===
First round

22 August 1984 1	Cesena	0–0	Torino	Cesena
20:45 UTC+2				Stadium: Dino Manuzzi; Referee: Redini

26 August 1984 2	Torino	3–1	Cremonese	Turin
20:30 UTC+2	Schachner 29'; Zaccarelli 35'; Júnior 57'		2' Nicoletti	Stadium: Stadio Comunale; Attendance: 17 546; Referee: Leni, Perugia

29 August 1984 3	Lanerossi	0–0	Torino	Vicenza
20:45 UTC+2				Stadium: Stadio Romeo Menti; Referee: Pezzella

2 September 1984 4	Torino	0–0	Monza	Torino
20:30 UTC+2				Stadium: Stadio Comunale; Referee: Tubertini

9 September 1984 5	Empoli	0–1	Torino	Empoli
16:30 UTC+2			56' Júnior	Stadium: Carlo Castellani; Attendance: 7 370; Referee: Pieri, Genoa

Eightfinals

13 February 1985	Torino	1–0	Cagliari Calcio	Torino
20:30 UTC+1	Júnior 86' (pen.)			Stadium: Stadio Comunale; Referee: Magni

27 February 1985	Cagliari	0–0 (0–1 agg.)	Torino	Cagliari
20:30 UTC+1				Stadium: Sant'Elia; Referee: Bianciardi

Quarterfinals

12 June 1985	Torino	0–0	U.C. Sampdoria	Turin
20:30 UTC+2				Stadium: Comunale; Attendance: 17.847; Referee: Casarin

19 June 1985	U.C. Sampdoria	4–2 (4–2 agg.)	Torino	Genoa
20:30 UTC+2	Vierchowod 10'; Francis 54' (pen.), 64'; Mancini 89'		60' Francini; 62' Comi	Stadium: Stadio Luigi Ferraris; Referee: Lombardo

== Sources ==
- RSSSF – Italy 1984/85
