= 1985–86 Torino Calcio season =

Torino Calcio
1985–86 season
- President: Sergio Rossi
- Head Coach: Luigi Radice
- Serie A: 5th
- Coppa Italia: Quarter-finals
- UEFA Cup: Second round
- Top goalscorer: League: Antonio Comi (7); All: Comi (13)
- Highest home attendance: 58,630 vs. Juventus (13 October 1985)
- Lowest home attendance: 656 vs. Lecce (28 May 1986)
- All statistics correct as of 14 June 1986.

== Season summary ==
Unlike the previous year, Torino was unable to stay in the top 3. Torino managed to end their season in the top 5, collecting a new qualification for UEFA Cup.

== Squad ==
=== Goalkeepers ===
- (Italy) Silvano Martina
- (Italy) Renato Copparoni
- (Italy) Renato Biasi

=== Defenders ===
- (Italy) Paolo Beruatto
- (Italy) Massimo Brambati
- (Italy) Giancarlo Corradini
- (Italy) Roberto Cravero
- (Italy) Luigi Danova
- (Italy) Giovanni Francini
- (Italy) Vittorio Pusceddu
- (Italy) Ezio Rossi

=== Midfielders ===
- (Italy) Flavio Chiti
- (Italy) Antonio Comi
- (Italy) Giuseppe Dossena
- (Italy) Giacomo Ferri
- (Brazil) Júnior
- (Italy) Marco Osio
- (Italy) Danilo Pileggi
- (Italy) Antonio Sabato
- (Italy) Renato Zaccarelli

=== Attackers ===
- (Italy) Franco Lerda
- (Italy) Pietro Mariani
- (Austria) Walter Schachner
- (Italy) Lirio Torregrossa

== Competitions ==
=== Serie A ===
==== League table ====
Pos	Team	Pld	W	D	L	GF	GA	GD	Pts	Qualification or relegation
2	Roma	30	19	3	8	51	27	+24	41	Qualification to Cup Winners' Cup
3	Napoli	30	14	11	5	35	21	+14	39	Qualification to UEFA Cup
4	Torino	30	11	11	8	31	26	+5	33	Qualification to UEFA Cup
5	Fiorentina	30	10	13	7	29	23	+6	33	Qualification to UEFA Cup
6	Internazionale	30	12	8	10	36	33	+3	32	Qualification to UEFA Cup

Source: RSSSF.com
Rules for classification: 1) Points; 2) Head-to-head points; 3) Head-to-head goal difference; 4) Goal difference; 5) Goals scored; 6) Draw. (Note: Head-to-head record is used only after all the matches between the teams in question have been played).

==== Matches ====
8 September 1985 1	Udinese	0–0	Torino	Udine
16:00 UTC+2		Report		Stadium: Stadio Friuli; Attendance: 31 696; Referee: D'Elia

15 September 1985 2	Torino	2–1	Fiorentina	Turin
16:00 UTC+2	Junior 25'; Corradini 60'	Report	86' D. Pellegrini	Stadium: Stadio Comunale; Attendance: 29 485; Referee: Paparesta (Bari)

22 September 1985 3	Lecce	0–0	Torino	Lecce
16:00 UTC+2		Report		Stadium: Stadio Via del Mare; Attendance: 41.565; Referee: Redini (Pisa)

29 September 1985 4	Torino	1–0	Sampdoria	Turin
15:00 UTC+1	Junior 64' (pen.)	Report		Stadium: Stadio Comunale; Attendance: 32,459; Referee: Bergamo (Livorno)

6 October 1985 5	Roma	2–0	Torino	Rome
15:00 UTC+1	Conti 41'; Tovalieri 87'	Report		Stadium: Stadio Olimpico; Attendance: 60.111; Referee: Lo Bello (Siracusa)

13 October 1985 6	Torino	1–2	Juventus	Turin
15:00 UTC+1	Scirea 39' (o.g.)	Report	4' Serena; 28' Platini	Stadium: Stadio Comunale; Attendance: 58.630; Referee: Agnolin (Bassano del Grappa)

20 October 1985 7	AC Milan	1–0	Torino	Milan
14:30 UTC+1	Di Bartolomei 38'	Report		Stadium: Stadio Giuseppe Meazza; Attendance: 52.243; Referee: Redini

27 October 1985 8	Torino	2–1	Napoli	Turin
14:30 UTC+1	Sabato 45'; Comi 54'	Report	87' Maradona	Stadium: Stadio Comunale; Attendance: 39.899; Referee: Bergamo (Livorno)

3 November 1985 9	Torino	1–0	Bari	Turin
14:30 UTC+1	E. Rossi 62'	Report		Stadium: Stadio Comunale; Attendance: 26.798; Referee: Bianciardi (Siena)

10 November 1985 10	Avellino	0–0	Torino	Avellino
14:30 UTC+1		Report		Stadium: Stadio Partenio; Attendance: 26.176; Referee: Lanese

24 November 1985 11	Torino	4–1	Pisa	Turin
14:30 UTC+1	Sabato 35'; Corradini 57'; Schachner 69'; Francini 85'	Report	2' Berggreen	Stadium: Stadio Comunale; Attendance: 18.979; Referee: Sguizzato

1 December 1985 12	Como	1–1	Torino	Como
14:30 UTC+1	Borgonovo 31'	Report	81' Comi	Stadium: Stadio Giuseppe Sinigaglia; Attendance: 12.008; Referee: Redini

8 December 1985 13	Inter Milan	3–3	Torino	Milan
14:30 UTC+1	Brady 21' (pen.); Rummenigge 55'; Bergomi 75'	Report	34' Comi; 44' Pusceddu; 64' Schachner	Stadium: Stadio Giuseppe Meazza; Attendance: 41.538; Referee: Paparesta

15 December 1985 14	Torino	0–0	Atalanta	Turin
14:30 UTC+1		Report		Stadium: Stadio Comunale; Attendance: 24.817; Referee: Coppetelli

22 December 1985 15	Hellas Verona	1–0	Torino	Verona
14:30 UTC+1	Galderisi 37'	Report		Stadium: Stadio Marcantonio Bentegodi; Attendance: 24.692; Referee: D'Elia

5 January 1986 16	Torino	2–0	Udinese	Turin
14:30 UTC+1	Comi 15'; Junior 58'	Report		Stadium: Stadio Comunale; Attendance: 21 974; Referee: Bianciardi

12 January 1986 17	Fiorentina	0–0	Torino	Florence
14:30 UTC+1		Report		Stadium: Stadio Comunale; Attendance: 38.593; Referee: Pezzella (Frattamaggiore)

19 January 1986 18	Torino	3–1	Lecce	Turin
14:30 UTC+1	S. Di Chiara 46' (o.g.); Corradini 68'; Junior 75'	Report	27' Pasculli	Stadium: Stadio Comunale; Attendance: 24.338; Referee: Luci (Florence)

26 January 1986 19	Sampdoria	0–0	Torino	Genoa
14:30 UTC+1		Report		Stadium: Stadio Luigi Ferraris; Attendance: 31.281; Referee: Paparesta (Bari)

9 February 1986 20	Torino	0–1	Roma	Turin
15:00 UTC+1		Report	35' Pruzzo	Stadium: Stadio Comunale; Attendance: 29 251; Referee: Pieri (Genoa)

16 February 1986 21	Juventus	1–1	Torino	Turin
15:00 UTC+1	Laudrup 25'	Report	87' Zaccarelli	Stadium: Stadio Comunale; Attendance: 49.874; Referee: Casarin (Milan)

23 February 1986 22	Torino	2–0	AC Milan	Turin
15:00 UTC+1	Comi 16', 65'	Report		Stadium: Stadio Comunale; Attendance: 39.467; Referee: D'Elia (Salerno)

2 March 1986 23	Napoli	3–1	Torino	Naples
15:00 UTC+1	Ferri 15' (o.g.); Caffarelli 16'; Bagni 50'	Report	14' Mariani	Stadium: Stadio San Paolo; Attendance: 68.425; Referee: Magni (Bergamo)

9 March 1986 24	Bari	1–0	Torino	Bari
15:00 UTC+1	Bivi 57' (pen.)	Report		Stadium: Stadio Comunale; Attendance: 24.019; Referee: Longhi (Rome)

16 March 1986 25	Torino	1–0	Avellino	Turin
15:00 UTC+1	Pusceddu 87'	Report		Stadium: Stadio Comunale; Attendance: 21.935; Referee: Coppetelli (Tivoli)

23 March 1986 26	Pisa	0–0	Torino	Pisa
15:00 UTC+1		Report		Stadium: Stadio Arena Garibaldi; Attendance: 22 475; Referee: Lanese (Messina)

6 April 1986 27	Torino	1–3	Como	Turin
15:30 UTC+2	Sabato 53'	Report	4' Maccoppi; 40' Corneliusson; 81' Tempestilli	Stadium: Stadio Comunale; Attendance: 19 983; Referee: Lombardo (Marsala)

13 April 1986 28	Torino	1–0	Inter Milan	Turin
15:30 UTC+2	Comi 67'	Report		Stadium: Stadio Comunale; Attendance: 34 234; Referee: Lo Bello (Siracusa)

20 April 1986 29	Atalanta	2–2	Torino	Bergamo
15:30 UTC+2	Donadoni 49'; Magrin 86'	Report	72' Dossena; 89' Schachner	Stadium: Stadio Comunale; Attendance: 25 738; Referee: Boschi (Parma)

27 April 1986 30	Torino	2–1	Hellas Verona	Turin
15:30 UTC+2	Francini 36', 61'	Report	25' Vignola	Stadium: Stadio Comunale; Attendance: 25.496; Referee: Fabricatore (Rome)

=== Topscorers ===
- (Italy) Antonio Comi 7
- (Brazil) Júnior 4
- (Italy) Giancarlo Corradini 3
- (Italy) Giovanni Francini 3
- (Austria) Walter Schachner 3

=== Coppa Italia ===
First Round

21 August 1985 1	Sambenedettese	1–2	Torino	San Benedetto del Tronto
20:45 UTC+2	Fattori 13'		38' Comi; 44' Schachner	Stadium: Stadio Riviera delle Palme; Referee: Redini

25 August 1985 2	Rimini	1–4	Torino	Rimini
20:45 UTC+2	Pircher 49'		12' Corradini; 38', 80' Comi; 83' Dossena	Stadium: Stadio Romeo Neri; Referee: Sguizzato

28 August 1985 3	Triestina	1–1	Torino	Trieste
20:30 UTC+2	De Falco 18'		27' Pileggi	Stadium: Stadio Giuseppe Grezar; Referee: Longhi

1 September 1985 4	Torino	2–2	Varese	Turin
20:30 UTC+2	Schachner 15', 36'		58' (pen.) Lucchi; 75' Pescatori	Stadium: Stadio Comunale; Referee: Vecchiatini

4 September 1985 5	Torino	2–0	Como	Turin
20:30 UTC+2	Junior 32' (pen.); Comi 86'			Stadium: Stadio Comunale; Referee: Lanese

Eightfinals

12 February 1986	Messina	0–2	Torino	Messina
20:30 UTC+1			29' Corradini; 42' Junior	Stadium: Stadio Giovanni Celeste; Referee: Pirandola

26 February 1986	Torino	2–0	Messina	Turin
15:00 UTC+1	Sabato 65'; E. Rossi 68'			Stadium: Stadio Comunale; Referee: Tuveri

Quarterfinals

7 May 1986	Sampdoria	2–0	Torino	Genoa
20:30 UTC+2	E. Rossi 55' (o.g.); Mancini 90'			Stadium: Luigi Ferraris; Referee: Lanese

24 May 1986	Torino	3–4	Sampdoria	Turin
20:30 UTC+2	Francini 33'; Mariani 47'; Schachner 66'		38' Matteoli; 42', 90' (pen.) Mancini; 64' Lorenzo	Stadium: Stadio Comunale; Referee: D'Elia

=== UEFA Cup ===
First round

18 September 1985	Torino	2–1	(Greece) Panathinaikos	Turin
20:30 UTC+2	Comi 48'; Mavridis 87' (o.g.)		51' Saravakos	Stadium: Stadio Comunale; Referee: (Sweden) Fredriksson

2 October 1985	(Greece) Panathinaikos	1–1	Torino	Athens
20:00 UTC+1	Saravakos 70' (pen.)		1' Comi	Stadium: Olympic; Attendance: 79.679; Referee: (France) Vautrot

Second round

23 October 1985	Torino	1–1	(Croatia) Hajduk Split	Turin
20:30 UTC+1	Francini 74'		35' Slišković	Stadium: Stadio Comunale; Attendance: 40.993; Referee: (Belgium) Ponnet

6 November 1985	(Croatia) Hajduk Split	3–1	Torino	Split
17:00 UTC+1	Asanović 2'; Slišković 29'; Zl. Vujović 55' (pen.)		15' (pen.) Junior	Stadium: Stadio Poljud; Referee: (Germany) Tritschler

== Sources ==
- RSSSF – Italy 1985/86
