= Casaroli =

Casaroli is an Italian surname. Notable people with the surname include:

- Agostino Casaroli (1914–1998), Italian cardinal and diplomat
- Walter Casaroli (born 1957), Italian footballer

== See also ==
- La banda Casaroli
