= Biasi =

The following is a list of notable people with the surname Biasi:

- Dario Biasi (born 1979), Italian footballer
- Gianni De Biasi (born 1956), Italian football coach and former player
- Giuseppe Biasi (1885–1945), Italian painter
- Nikolai Biasi (1893–1973) Soviet general of Italian descent
- Renato Biasi (born 1966), Italian footballer
- Stefano Pietri Biasi (born 1985), Italian footballer
- Gino Biasi (1931–2016), Italian businessman
- Leonardo Biasi (born 1972), Brazilian businessman
