= Cuoiovaldarno RFC =

Italian football club

Cuoiovaldarno
- Full name: Cuoiovaldarno Romaiano Football Club
- Founded: 2003; 22 years ago (as Cuoiopelli Cappiano Romaiano)
- Dissolved: 2009; 16 years ago
- Ground: Stadio Libero Masini, Santa Croce sull'Arno, Italy
- Capacity: 3,350
- League: Eccellenza
Home colours	Away colours

Cuoiovaldarno Romaiano Football Club, colloquially known as Cuoiovaldarno, was an Italian football club based in Santa Croce sull'Arno, Tuscany.

== History ==
The club was founded in 2003 with the denomination of Cuoiopelli Cappiano Romaiano, as a merger between Cappiano Romaiano, a small team from Ponte a Cappiano, frazione of Fucecchio, who was just promoted to Serie C2 at the time, and Cuoiopelli, a regionally more renowned Serie D team from Santa Croce sull'Arno.

The club played in Lega Pro Seconda Divisione consecutively from 2003 to 2009, when they were defeated by Bellaria in the relegation playoffs. In June 2009, the club announced a switch to the denomination of Cuoiovaldarno. Only a month later the club's chairman renounced playing in Serie D for the 2009–10 season, causing the exit of the club from football panorama.

== Colors and badge ==
The team's colors were white, red and blue.

== Notable former players ==
- (Italy) David Balleri (for Cuoiopelli, before the merger)
- (Italy) Marco Landucci
- (Italy) Cristiano Lucarelli (for Cuoiopelli, before the merger)
- (Italy) Massimiliano Allegri (first team)
