= Walter Casaroli =

Italian former professional footballer

Personal information
- Date of birth: April 13, 1957 (age 69)
- Place of birth: Rome, Italy
- Height: 1.78 m (5 ft 10 in)
- Position: Midfielder

Senior career*
Years	Team	Apps	(Gls)
1974–1976	Roma	11	(3)
1976–1977	Como	26	(4)
1977–1979	Roma	31	(4)
1979–1980	Parma	29	(4)
1980–1981	Campobasso	29	(3)
1981–1982	Pescara	30	(0)
1982–1984	Casertana	59	(14)
1984–1987	Empoli	84	(5)
1987–1988	Casertana	20	(0)
1988–1989	Triestina	16	(0)
- * Club domestic league appearances and goals

Walter Casaroli (born April 13, 1957 in Rome) is an Italian former professional footballer who played as a midfielder.

He played 4 seasons (55 games, 8 goals) in Serie A for Roma and Empoli.
