= Simone Sereni =

Italian footballer

Personal information
- Date of birth: 9 August 1968 (age 58)
- Place of birth: Montevarchi
- Height: 1.72 m (5 ft 8 in)
- Position: Midfielder

Senior career*
Years	Team	Apps	(Gls)
1987–1988	Fiorentina		
1988–1989	Trento		
1989	Fiorentina		
1994–1995	Alessandria		
1995–1997	Firenze		
1999–2002	Arezzo		
- * Club domestic league appearances and goals

Simone Sereni (born 9 August 1968) is a retired Italian football midfielder.
