= Egidio Notaristefano =

Italian football manager (born 1966)

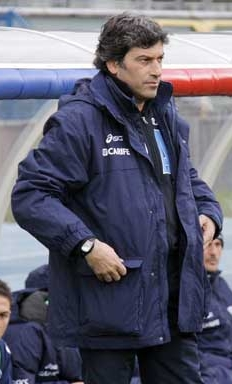

Personal information
- Date of birth: 4 February 1966 (age 60)
- Place of birth: Milan, Italy
- Height: 1.77 m (5 ft 10 in)
- Position: Midfielder

Senior career*
Years	Team	Apps	(Gls)
1983–1990	Como	107	(5)
1990–1991	Bologna	16	(2)
1991–1995	Lecce	134	(7)
1995–1996	Perugia	3	(0)
1996–1998	Alessandria	62	(3)
1998–2000	Meda	41	(4)
2000–2001	Pro Lissone	29	(2)
Total		392	(23)

International career
1986–1987	Italy U21	10	(1)

Managerial career
- 2007–2008: Legnano
- 2008–2009: Novara
- 2009–2011: SPAL
- 2011–2012: Carpi
- 2013: Alessandria
- * Club domestic league appearances and goals

Egidio Notaristefano (born 4 February 1966) is an Italian football manager and former player. A midfielder, he played for the Italy under-21 national team.

== Career ==
Notaristefano began his playing career at Como in the early 1980s, and he made his Serie A debut in 1984. He made his Italy under-21 debut against Austria on 12 November 1986, at Fontanafredda. He won 10 caps for the under-21s, and scored his only international goal against Switzerland at Neuchâtel on 16 October 1987.

Notaristefano left Como in 1990 to join Bologna, and he finished his career with spells at Lecce, Perugia, Alessandria, Meda and Pro Lissone.

Following his retirement, he managed the youth team of Legnano before being promoted to first-team manager in November 2007. He spent six months at Legnano before taking the manager's job at Novara in May 2008. He left the club in May 2009, and he joined SPAL in November 2009.

In March 2013 he replaced Giovanni Cusatis as manager of Alessandria.
