= Marco Landucci =

Italian footballer

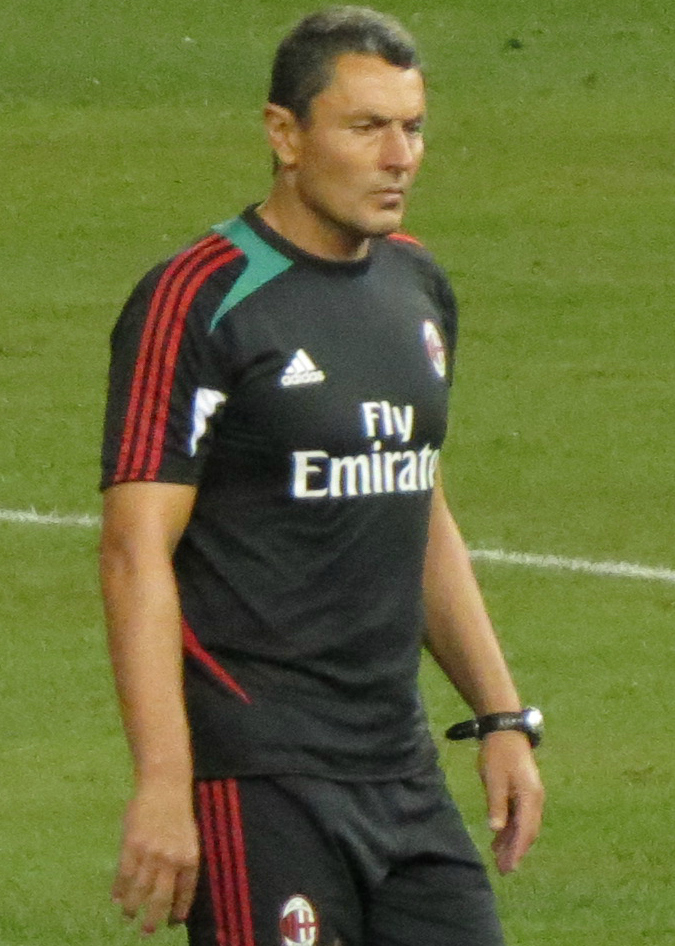
- Landucci in August 2012

Personal information
- Date of birth: 25 March 1964 (age 62)
- Place of birth: Lucca, Italy
- Height: 1.88 m (6 ft 2 in)
- Position: Goalkeeper

Team information
- Current team: Napoli (assistant)

Senior career*
Years	Team	Apps	(Gls)
1980–1991	Fiorentina	126	(0)
1981–1982	→ Viareggio (loan)	7	(0)
1984–1985	→ Rondinella (loan)	34	(0)
1985–1986	→ Parma (loan)	34	(0)
1991–1992	Lucchese	33	(0)
1992–1994	Brescia	44	(0)
1994–1995	Avellino	30	(0)
1995–1996	Inter Milan	0	(0)
1996	Venezia	2	(0)
1997	Verona	1	(0)
1997–2001	Lucchese	4	(0)
1998–1999	→ Cuoiopelli (loan)	12	(0)
Total		327	(0)

Managerial career
- 2001–2006: Fiorentina Primavera (goalkeeper coach)
- 2006–2008: Grosseto (goalkeeper coach)
- 2008–2010: Cagliari (assistant coach)
- 2010–2014: AC Milan (goalkeeper coach)
- 2014–2019: Juventus (assistant coach)
- 2021–2024: Juventus (assistant coach)
- 2025–2026: AC Milan (assistant coach)
- 2026–: Napoli (assistant coach)
- * Club domestic league appearances and goals

Marco Landucci (born 25 March 1964) is a football coach and former professional footballer who played as a goalkeeper and current assistant coach for Serie A club Napoli. Landucci has been assistant to Massimiliano Allegri since 2008.
