= Michele Gelsi =

Italian footballer

Personal information
- Date of birth: 7 September 1968
- Place of birth: Italy
- Position(s): Midfielder

Senior career*
Years	Team	Apps	(Gls)
-1989	ACF Fiorentina	16	(0)
1998-1989	Parma Calcio 1913→(loan)	16	(0)
1989-1992	Delfino Pescara 1936	103	(7)
1992-1993	A.C. Perugia Calcio	32	(4)
1993-1994	Udinese Calcio	12	(1)
1994	A.C. Perugia Calcio	9	(0)
1994-2000	Delfino Pescara 1936	202	(42)
2000-2001	Ravenna F.C.	9	(0)
2001	Al-Ittihad Club		
2001-2003	A.S. Livorno Calcio	40	(0)
2003	S.S.D. Lucchese 1905	12	(0)
2003-2004	S.S. Arezzo	32	(7)
2004-2005	Mantova 1911 S.S.D.	29	(1)
2005-2006	Renato Curi Angolana	22	(1)
- *Club domestic league appearances and goals

Michele Gelsi (born 7 September 1968) is an Italian retired footballer who played as a midfielder.
