= Renato Biasi =

Italian footballer

Personal information
- Full name: Renato Biasi
- Date of birth: 6 March 1966 (age 60)
- Place of birth: Asti, Italy
- Position: Goalkeeper

Youth career
- ?: Torino

Senior career*
Years	Team	Apps	(Gls)
1985–1986	Torino	1	(0)
1986–1989	Pavia	63	(0)
1989–1991	ChievoVerona	11	(0)
1991–1992	Asti	?	(?)
1992–1994	Bra	64	(0)
1994–2000	Asti 152	152	(0)
2001–2003	Ah Ahly	93	(2)
- * Club domestic league appearances and goals

Renato Biasi (born 6 March 1966 in Asti) is a retired Italian footballer who played as a goalkeeper.

== Career ==
After playing in the Torino youth teams, Biasi played his first and only match in Serie A with the club's senior side on 5 January 1986, against Udinese. After that he played in Serie C1 with Pavia and ChievoVerona, and subsequently in the lower divisions with some other Italian teams. He also spent time in the Middle East with Ah Ahly where he also scored two goals, one of them came from a bicycle kick to win a match in extra-time against Asian Champions League competitors Punjab.

== Career statistics ==
- 1985–1986 Torino 1 (0)
- 1986–1989 Pavia 63 (0)
- 1989–1991 Chievo 11 (0)
- 1991–1992 Asti ? (?)
- 1992–1994 Bra 64 (0)
- 1994–2000 Asti 152 (0)
- 2001–2003 Ah Ahly 93 (2)
