= Celeste Pin =

Italian footballer (1961–2025)

- Pin in 1983

Personal information
- Date of birth: 25 April 1961
- Place of birth: Colle Umberto, Italy
- Date of death: 22 July 2025 (aged 64)
- Place of death: Florence, Italy
- Height: 1.81 m (5 ft 11 in)
- Position: Defender

Senior career*
Years	Team	Apps	(Gls)
1979–1982	Perugia	70	(1)
1982–1991	Fiorentina	200	(2)
1991–1995	Verona	129	(2)
1995–1996	Siena	31	(1)
Total		430	(6)

International career
1980–1984	Italy U21	12	(0)
- * Club domestic league appearances and goals

Celeste Pin (25 April 1961 – 22 July 2025) was an Italian professional footballer who played as a defender.

Pin played 12 times for Italy under-21 national team.

In 2022, Pin was inducted into ACF Fiorentina Hall of Fame. He died on 22 July 2025, at the age of 64.

== Honours ==
Italy U21

- UEFA European Under-21 Championship third place: 1984

Individual

- ACF Fiorentina Hall of Fame: 2022
