= Roberto Onorati =

Italian footballer

Personal information
- Date of birth: 5 February 1966 (age 60)
- Place of birth: Rome, Italy
- Height: 1.83 m (6 ft 0 in)
- Position: Midfielder

Youth career
- Lazio
- Lodigiani

Senior career*
| Years | Team | Apps | (Gls) |
| 1983–1984 | Pistoiese | | |
| 1984–1990 | Fiorentina | | |
| 1988–1989 | → Genoa (loan) | | |
| 1989–1990 | → Avellino (loan) | | |
| 1990–1996 | Genoa | 131+ (Note: Statistics are missing for the 1995–96 season.) | (10+) |
| 1996–1998 | Nice | 29 | (2) |

International career
| 1986–1987 | Italy U21 | 8 | (0) |
- * Club domestic league appearances and goals

Roberto Onorati (born 5 February 1966) is an Italian former professional footballer who played as a midfielder.

== Post-playing career ==
From 1999 to 2000, Onorati was a board member at his former club Nice. For a short amount of time in September 2005, he was the sporting director of Pisa.

== Honours ==
Genoa

- Serie B: 1988–89
- Anglo-Italian Cup: 1995–96

Nice

- Coupe de France: 1996–97
