= Walter Schachner =

Austrian footballer and manager (born 1957)

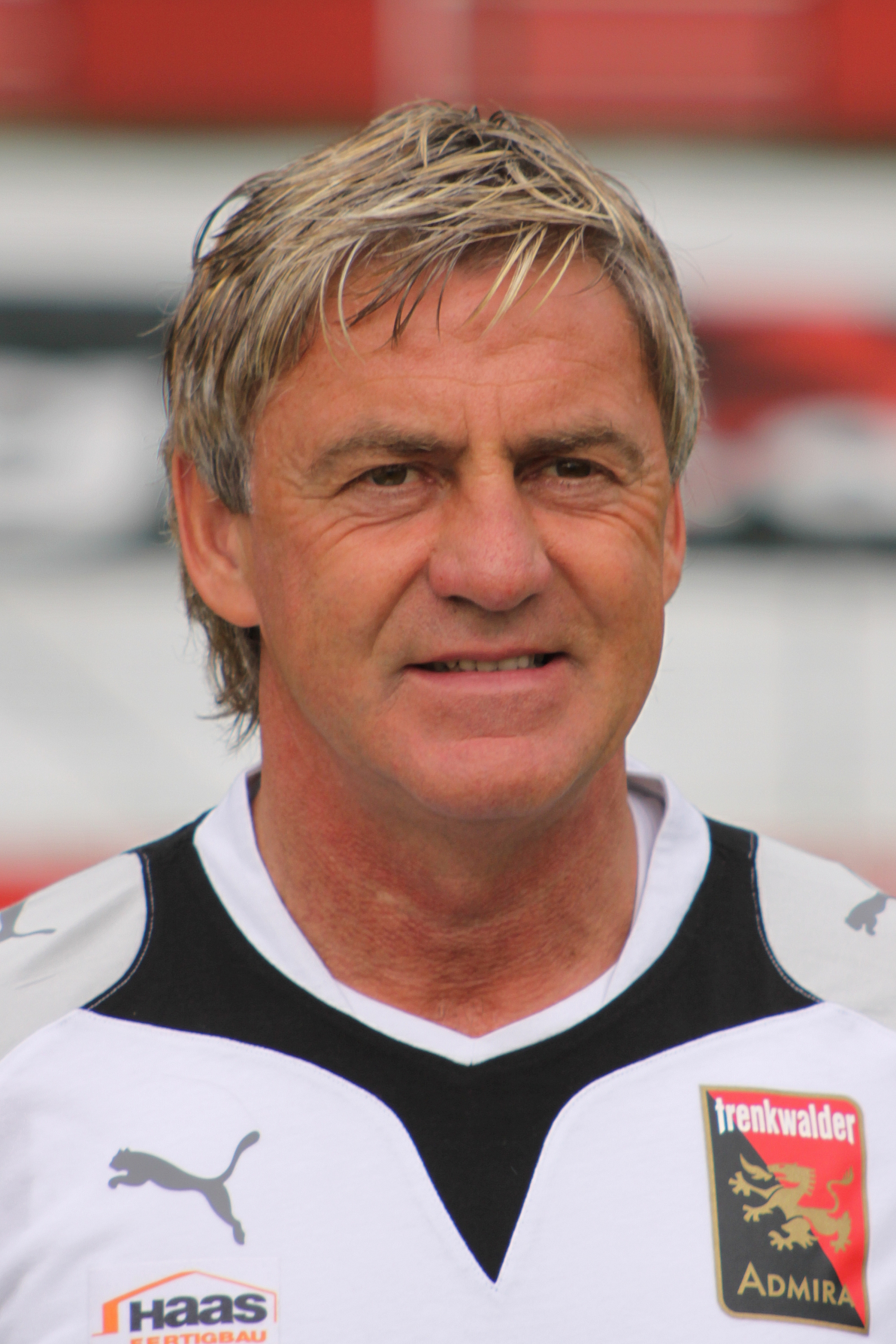
- Schachner in 2009

Personal information
- Date of birth: 1 February 1957 (age 69)
- Place of birth: Leoben, Austria
- Height: 1.80 m (5 ft 11 in)
- Position: Forward

Youth career
- 1967–1975: St. Michael

Senior career*
Years	Team	Apps	(Gls)
1975–1978	Alpine Donawitz	72	(65)
1978–1981	Austria Wien	101	(72)
1981–1983	Cesena	58	(17)
1983–1986	Torino	85	(18)
1986	Pisa		
1986–1988	Avellino	48	(13)
1988–1990	Sturm Graz	16	(3)
1990	FC Salzburg	20	(18)
1991	Grazer AK	8	(2)
1991	VSE St. Pölten	9	(1)
1991	SR Donaufeld	5	(0)
1992	Alpine Donawitz	6	(2)
1992–1993	DSV Leoben	20	(19)
1993–1994	Sturm Graz	11	(0)
1994–1996	DSV Leoben	50	(12)
1996–1997	FC Tirol Innsbruck	6	(0)
1997	ASK Kottingbrunn		
1998	Eintracht Wels	12	(4)

International career
1976–1994	Austria	64	(23)

Managerial career
- 1999–2000: FC Zeltweg
- 2000–2002: FC Kärnten
- 2002: Austria Wien
- 2002–2006: Grazer AK
- 2006–2007: 1860 Munich
- 2007: SK Kärnten
- 2008–2010: VfB Admira Wacker Mödling
- 2011–2012: LASK
- * Club domestic league appearances and goals

Walter "Schoko" Schachner (born 1 February 1957) is an Austrian football manager and former player, who played as a forward. He made 64 appearances scoring 23 goals for the Austria national team.

As he always brought chocolate to the games when he was a boy, he got the nickname schoko. He was one of the most successful Austrian players in Italian football, as he played for four clubs over seven years.

== Club career ==
Schachner was born in Leoben, Austria. Much-travelled, he started his professional career at local outfit Alpine Donawitz at 18 in the 1975–76 season, earning a place in the national team after only one and a half season. He was duly picked up by Vienna club Austria Wien but moved abroad to play in Italy for seven years, from 1981 to 1988, in A.C. Cesena (58 matches, 17 goals), Torino F.C. (85 matches, 18 goals) and Avellino (48 matches 13 goals).

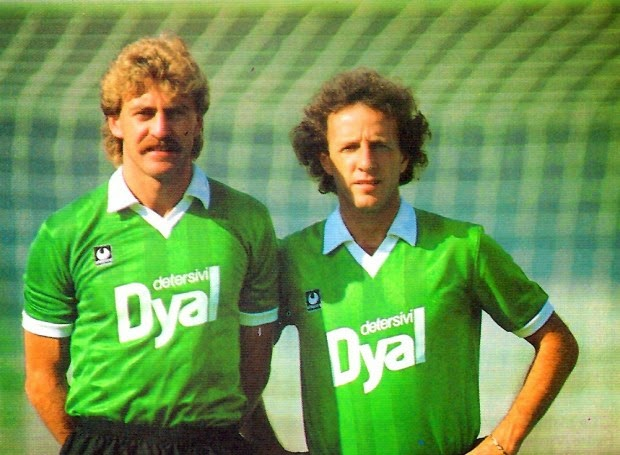
Schachner and Dirceu with Avellino in 1986–87 season

In 1981 when Cesena was promoted to Serie A, the ultras changed their title to Weisschwarz Brigaden (meaning "Black-and-white Brigades" in German language) to honor the Austrian forward. He returned to Austria in 1988, moving from one club to another and mostly in the second division before finally hanging up his boots at 41 years of age at Eintracht Wels.

== International career ==
Schachner made his debut for the Austria national team in a December 1976 World Cup qualification match against Malta and was a participant at the 1978 and 1982 FIFA World Cups. He earned 64 caps, scoring 23 goals. His final international game was an August 1994 friendly match against Russia which was his farewell match since he was replaced by Harald Cerny early in the game and he had played his previous international over four years earlier.

On 21 June 1978, at the World Cup held in Argentina he was among starting 11 of the Austrian team that beat the reigning champions, West Germany 3–2 and eliminated them from the competition, a historic match named "The Miracle of Cordoba". Conversely, he was also a member of the Austrian team that lost 1–0 to West Germany in 1982 in the "Disgrace of Gijón" but distinguished himself by making an effort to actually play a normal game.

== Managerial career ==
Schachner started his career as a coach in the 1999–2000 season with FC Zeltweg and led them to promotion from the fourth to the third division.

In the 2000–01 and 2001–02 seasons he coached FC Kärnten in the Austrian First League. Under his leadership the team was promoted to the Austrian Bundesliga and won the National Cup in the first year and the National Supercup in the second.

At the start of the 2002–03 season Schachner coached Austria Wien in the Austrian Bundesliga until he was replaced by Christoph Daum in early October 2002 despite an excellent start to the season. At the time of his dismissal the team led the championship with seven points ahead of the second-place team and had just defeated Ukrainian champions Shakhtar Donetsk 5–2 in the UEFA Cup.

A few days after his dismissal he was hired by Grazer AK, which held the penultimate place in the Austrian Bundesliga. The team finished the season in second place behind Austria Wien. In the 2003–04 season Schachner led Grazer AK to win their first and so far their only national champions title. In the same season they also won the Austrian Cup. In 2004–05 the team were runners-up in the Bundesliga and in the 2005 UEFA Champions League faced Liverpool (coached by Rafael Benitez), the future winners of the title, in the third qualification round. Grazer AK managed to win the return leg at Anfield 1–0, after the home defeat of 2–0. In January 2006 he was sacked by Grazer AK, officially to reduce costs, but in reality because he was in talks with several other clubs.

Schachner moved to 1860 Munich who were in the 2. Bundesliga at the time and avoided relegation only in the penultimate round. The club was going through difficulties in those years and faced economic problems. On 9 March 2007, he and 1860 Munich agreed to terminate his contract at the end of the 2006–07 season, effective on 30 June of the same year. His successor was Marco Kurz.

Schachner signed a new contract at SK Austria Kärnten in April 2007. He did not achieve the desired results with the newly-formed team and was fired by the management in December of that year.

In August 2008, Schachner replaced Heinz Peischl, the coach of FC Admira Wacker Mödling (Austrian First League), who had been sacked for gaining only one point in five games which left the team at the bottom of the rankings. With Schachner the team finished the season in the third place. Moreover, Admira Wacker Mödling reached the National Cup final for the first time in thirteen years, but were defeated by Austria Wien 3–1.

He remained as coach of Admira Wacker Mödling for the 2009–10 season before being replaced by their youth team coach on 26 April 2010, leaving the team in third place with four points behind the leader, struggling for promotion 6 rounds before the end of the season.

== Career statistics ==
Scores and results list Austria's goal tally first, score column indicates score after each Schachner goal.

List of international goals scored by Walter Schachner
No.	Date	Venue	Opponent	Score	Result	Competition
1	15 December 1976	Ramat Gan Stadium, Ramat Gan, Israel	Israel	2–1	3–1	Friendly
2	9 March 1977	Praterstadion, Vienna, Austria	Greece	2–0	2–0	Friendly
3	17 April 1977	Praterstadion, Vienna, Austria	Turkey	1–0	1–0	1978 FIFA World Cup qualification
4	3 June 1978	Estadio José Amalfitani, Buenos Aires, Argentina	Spain	1–0	2–1	1978 FIFA World Cup
5	20 September 1978	Praterstadion, Vienna, Austria	Scotland	2–0	3–2	UEFA Euro 1980 qualifying
6	15 November 1978	Praterstadion, Vienna, Austria	Portugal	1–1	1–2	UEFA Euro 1980 qualifying
7	21 November 1979	Estádio da Luz, Lisbon, Portugal	Portugal	2–1	2–1	UEFA Euro 1980 qualifying
8	15 November 1980	Praterstadion, Vienna, Austria	Albania	2–0	5–0	1982 FIFA World Cup qualification
9	15 November 1980	Praterstadion, Vienna, Austria	Albania	3–0	5–0	1982 FIFA World Cup qualification
10	14 October 1981	Praterstadion, Vienna, Austria	West Germany	1–0	1–3	1982 FIFA World Cup qualification
11	24 March 1982	Népstadion, Budapest, Hungary	Hungary	2–0	3–2	Friendly
12	28 April 1982	Praterstadion, Vienna, Austria	Czechoslovakia	1–0	2–1	Friendly
13	28 April 1982	Praterstadion, Vienna, Austria	Czechoslovakia	2–0	2–1	Friendly
14	17 June 1982	Estadio Carlos Tartiere, Oviedo, Spain	Chile	1–0	1–0	1982 FIFA World Cup
15	21 June 1982	Estadio Carlos Tartiere, Oviedo, Spain	Algeria	1–0	2–0	1982 FIFA World Cup
16	13 October 1982	Praterstadion, Vienna, Austria	Northern Ireland	1–0	2–0	UEFA Euro 1984 qualifying
17	13 October 1982	Praterstadion, Vienna, Austria	Northern Ireland	2–0	2–0	UEFA Euro 1984 qualifying
18	17 November 1982	Gerhard Hanappi Stadium, Vienna, Austria	Turkey	4–0	4–0	UEFA Euro 1984 qualifying
19	8 June 1983	Qemal Stafa Stadium, Tirana, Albania	Albania	1–0	2–1	UEFA Euro 1984 qualifying
20	8 June 1983	Qemal Stafa Stadium, Tirana, Albania	Albania	2–0	2–1	UEFA Euro 1984 qualifying
21	26 September 1984	Népstadion, Budapest, Hungary	Hungary	1–0	1–3	1986 FIFA World Cup qualification
22	1 May 1985	De Kuip, Rotterdam, Netherlands	Netherlands	1–1	1–1	1986 FIFA World Cup qualification
23	7 May 1985	Liebenau Stadium, Graz, Austria	Cyprus	3–0	4–0	1986 FIFA World Cup qualification

== Honours ==
=== Player ===
Austria Wien

- Austrian Bundesliga: 1978–79, 1979–80, 1980–81
- Austrian Cup: 1979–80

Individual

- Austrian Bundesliga top scorer: 1978–79, 1979–80
- Coppa Italia top scorer: 1983–84 (eight goals)
- Torino FC Hall of Fame: 2024

=== Manager ===
Grazer AK

- Austrian Bundesliga: 2003–04
- Austrian Cup: 2003–04
- Austrian Supercup: 2001
