= Roberto Galbiati =

Italian footballer and coach

Personal information
- Date of birth: 16 September 1957 (age 69)
- Place of birth: Cernusco sul Naviglio, Italy
- Height: 1.76 m (5 ft 9 1/2 in)
- Position: Defender

Senior career*
Years	Team	Apps	(Gls)
1974–1976	Internazionale	18	(0)
1976–1978	Pescara	65	(1)
1978–1982	Fiorentina	111	(1)
1982–1985	Torino	75	(1)
1985–1986	Lazio	30	(0)
1986–1987	Fiorentina	25	(0)
1987–1989	Prato	55	(1)
1989–1990	Spezia	29	(0)

Managerial career
- 2001: Fiorentina (youth)
- 2006–2007: Fortis Juventus
- 2007: Fortis Juventus
- 2007: Cecina
- 2009–2011: Fortis Juventus
- * Club domestic league appearances and goals

Roberto Galbiati (born 16 September 1957 in Cernusco sul Naviglio) is an Italian professional football coach and a former player, who played as a defender.
