= Renzo Contratto =

Italian footballer and sports agent

Personal information
- Date of birth: 5 December 1959 (age 66)
- Place of birth: Borgaro Torinese, Italy
- Height: 1.75 m (5 ft 9 in)
- Position: Defender

Youth career
- Barcanova

Senior career*
Years	Team	Apps	(Gls)
1976–1977	Mantova		
1962–1976	Alessandria	62	(1)
1979–1980	Pisa	17	(0)
1980–1988	Fiorentina	222	(0)
1988–1991	Atalanta	87	(0)
1991–1993	Udinese	29	(0)
1993–1995	Alzano Virescit	53	(0)

International career
1980–1982	Italy U21	6	(0)
- * Club domestic league appearances and goals

Renzo Contratto (born 5 December 1959) is an Italian sports agent and former professional footballer who played as a defender.

In 2014, he was inducted into ACF Fiorentina Hall of Fame.

== Career ==
In his youth, Contratto played for Barcanova, before starting his professional career in Mantova, Alessandria, and Pisa.

In 1980, he was bought by Fiorentina, where he debuted in Serie A on 14 September. After 285 appearances in 8 years, he moved to Atalanta, where he debuted in a European competition, playing the 1989–90 and the 1990–91 UEFA Cup.

At international level, he played six times for Italy national under-21 football team.

After retirement, he became a sports agent.

== Honours ==
=== Individual ===
- ACF Fiorentina Hall of Fame: 2012
