= Paolo Monelli =

Italian footballer

Personal information
- Full name: Paolo Monelli
- Date of birth: 27 January 1963 (age 63)
- Place of birth: Castelnovo ne' Monti, Italy
- Height: 1.83 m (6 ft 0 in)
- Position: Forward

Youth career
- 1976–1977: Scandianese
- 1977–1978: Monza

Senior career*
| Years | Team | Apps | (Gls) |
| 1978–1981 | Monza | 62 | (13) |
| 1981–1987 | Fiorentina | 124 | (26) |
| 1982–1983 | → Ascoli (loan) | 22 | (2) |
| 1987–1988 | Lazio | 37 | (13) |
| 1988–1990 | Bari | 57 | (14) |
| 1990–1993 | Pescara | 15 | (4) |
| 1993 | Vicenza | 10 | (0) |
| 1993–1994 | Nola | 10 | (2) |
| 1994–1995 | AC Crevalcore | 20 | (3) |
| 1995–1996 | A.C. Palazzolo | 25 | (2) |
| 1996–1997 | Cantalupo Monza | ? | (?) |
| 1997–1998 | US Canzese | 14 | (5) |

International career
| 1980–1984 | Italy U21 | 15 | (4) |
Medal record
Representing Italy
- * Club domestic league appearances and goals

Paolo Monelli (born 27 January 1963) is a retired Italian professional footballer who played as a forward.
