= Stefano Carobbi =

Italian footballer and manager

Personal information
- Date of birth: 16 January 1964 (age 62)
- Place of birth: Pistoia, Italy
- Height: 1.79 m (5 ft 10 in)
- Position: Defender

Team information
- Current team: C.F. Florentia

Senior career*
Years	Team	Apps	(Gls)
1981–1989	ACF Fiorentina	122	(3)
1989–1991	A.C. Milan	11	(0)
1991–1993	ACF Fiorentina	57	(1)
1993–1994	Lecce	11	(0)
1994	ACF Fiorentina	0	(0)
1994–1995	Poggibonsi	17	(0)
Total		218	(4)

International career
	Italy U-21	7	(1)

Managerial career
- 2012–2014: FiesoleCaldine
- 2018–: C.F. Florentia
- * Club domestic league appearances and goals

Stefano Carobbi (born 16 January 1964) is an Italian association football manager and former player, who played as a defender, in the role of full-back. In 2014, he was the manager of Colligiana in Serie D.

== Club career ==
Carobbi had three separate spells with Fiorentina throughout his career. Despite competition from legendary defenders such as Maldini, Baresi, Costacurta and Tassotti, he also played two seasons (1989–91) with A.C. Milan, winning the 1990 European Cup, two European Super Cups, and two Intercontinental Cups during an extremely successful period in the club's history under manager Arrigo Sacchi. He also played for Lecce.

== International career ==
Carobbi won seven caps for Italy U-21, and was part of Italy's team at the 1988 Olympics which finished in 4th place after being eliminated in the semi-finals of the competition.

== Managerial career ==
In the 2012–13 season, he managed FiesoleCaldine in the Serie D; in 2014 he took on the role of Colligiana's head coach.

== Honours ==
=== Club ===
Milan

- European Cup: 1989–90
- European Super Cup: 1989, 1990
- Intercontinental Cup: 1989, 1990
