= Giancarlo Antognoni =

Italian footballer (born 1954)

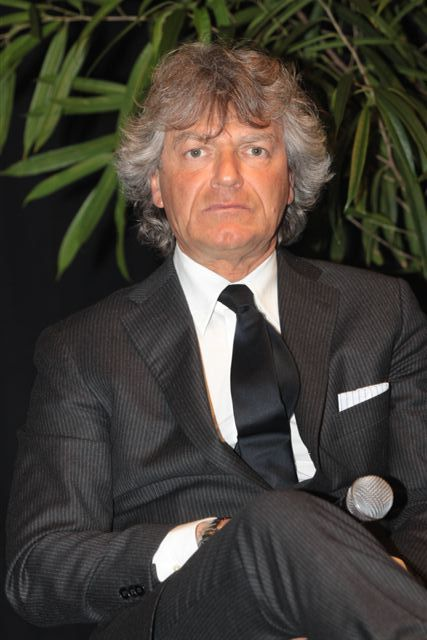
- Antognoni in 2011

Personal information
- Full name: Giancarlo Antognoni
- Date of birth: 1 April 1954 (age 72)
- Place of birth: Marsciano, Italy
- Height: 1.79 m (5 ft 10 in)
- Position: Attacking midfielder

Senior career*
Years	Team	Apps	(Gls)
1970–1972	Asti	27	(4)
1972–1987	Fiorentina	341	(61)
1987–1989	Lausanne-Sport	51	(7)
Total		419	(72)

International career
1974–1983	Italy	73	(7)
Medal record
Italy
FIFA World Cup
Gold medal – first place	Spain 1982
- * Club domestic league appearances and goals

Giancarlo Antognoni (Italian pronunciation: [dʒaŋˈkarlo antoɲˈɲoːni]; born 1 April 1954) is an Italian former professional footballer who played as a midfielder. A skilful and creative offensive playmaker, he played most of his club career with Fiorentina, with whom they won the Coppa Italia and the Anglo-Italian League Cup in 1975. At international level, Antognoni won the 1982 FIFA World Cup with the Italy national team and represented his country at the 1978 FIFA World Cup and at the 1980 UEFA European Championship. On 11 October 2010, he was awarded the "Legends of Football" Golden Foot award.

== Club career ==
Antognoni was born in Marsciano. His career started in the Serie D with Asti Ma.Co.Bi., when he was only sixteen. In 1972, Nils Liedholm convinced him to join Fiorentina.

He made his debut in Serie A in October 1972 with Fiorentina, whom he later captained, also eventually inheriting the number 10 shirt. He won the Coppa Italia (Italian Cup) during the 1974–75 season, as well as the 1975 Anglo-Italian League Cup that season, over West Ham. He narrowly missed out on the Serie A title with Fiorentina during the 1981–82 season, losing out to rivals Juventus by a single point on the final match-day. Antognoni played 412 games with Fiorentina and scored 61 goals. Antognoni is regarded as a Fiorentina legend, and as one of the club's best ever players, as he played for the club throughout his entire Italian professional career between the 70s and 80s. He holds the record for the most appearances in Serie A for Fiorentina, with 341 appearances.

In November 1981, Antognoni fractured his skull in two places and went into a coma for two days following an accidental collision with Genoa's goalkeeper Silvano Martina, which saw the latter's knee come into heavy contact with Antognoni's head; according to FIFA.com, the playmaker went into cardiac arrest for 30 seconds, which led Genoa's captain, Claudio Onofri, to exclaim "he’s dead, he’s dead!" However, Genoa's team doctor – Pierluigi Gatto – was able to act quickly and revive Antognoni's pulse by untwisting his tongue and giving him CPR through chest compressions and mouth-to-mouth resuscitation.

In 1987, Antognoni joined Lausanne Sports. He made 51 appearances and scored seven goals. He retired in 1989 while at Lausanne.

== International career ==
Antognoni's senior international career with the Italy national team started on 20 November 1974, in a 3–1 away loss to the Netherlands at the age of twenty, in a Euro 1976 qualifying match. Antognoni took part in the 1978 World Cup with Italy under manager Enzo Bearzot, where the team finished in fourth place after a semi-final defeat to the Netherlands. He also reached another fourth-place finish at the 1980 European Championship on home soil, wearing the number 10 jersey. His greatest achievement with the national team came when he won the 1982 FIFA World Cup, however, after recovering from a skull–injury sustained the year prior in time for the tournament. Antognoni made six appearances throughout the competition, and played a crucial role in the team's title run with his ability to circulate possession and create chances with his passing as the team's main playmaker; he provided the second–highest number of assists throughout the tournament (three), behind only Brazil's Zico and West Germany's Pierre Littbarski. He also had a goal in Italy's 3–2 second–round victory over Brazil incorrectly ruled out for offside; however, the result allowed Italy to advance to the semi-finals. He started in the latter match against Poland, which Italy won 2–0, but he was not able to participate in the final 3–1 victory over West Germany due to an injury he sustained in the semi-final.

In total, he received 73 caps for Italy, scoring seven goals. His last appearance came against Czechoslovakia, on 16 November 1983. He captained of the national team on four occasions. Antognoni is currently the Fiorentina player with the most appearances for the national side, and also holds the record for the most appearances wearing the number 10 shirt for Italy. With two red cards throughout his international career, he is also Italy's most red carded player ever, alongside Franco Causio and Daniele De Rossi.

== Style of play ==
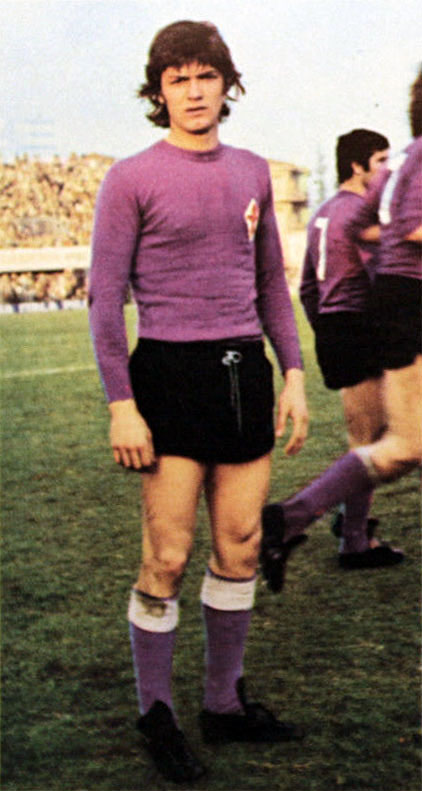
Antognoni with Fiorentina in 1974

A skillful, quick, and creative offensive playmaker, Antognoni is considered to be one of Italy's greatest players ever, one of the most talented players of his generation, and one of the best attacking midfielders of all time, due to his vision, control, technical ability, intelligence, accurate distribution, passing range, and eye for goal from midfield. which enabled him to score goals or create chances for his teammates; he was also known for his ability to circulate possession, dictate play in midfield, and orchestrate his team's attacking moves with his quick short passing on the ground, as well as his ability to switch the play with long diagonal balls. Moreover, he was an excellent dribbler, who was known for his pace and elegance on the ball, as well as quick feet, and his ability to keep his head up when carrying the ball forward while advancing in possession from midfield, which saw him likened to compatriot Gianni Rivera by pundits. Although he was usually deployed as a traditional number 10 behind the forwards, he was also capable of playing as a central midfielder, where he functioned as a deep-lying playmaker. Antognoni was also highly regarded throughout his career for his accuracy from bending set pieces, and for his powerful shots from outside the area; although naturally right footed, he was capable of passing or striking the ball accurately with either foot. In addition to his footballing skills, he also stood out for his leadership throughout his career, as well as his work-rate. Despite his talent, his career was largely marked by injuries.

== Career statistics ==
=== Club ===
Appearances and goals by club, season and competition
Club	Season	League			Cup		Continental		Total	
Club	Season	Division	Apps	Goals	Apps	Goals	Apps	Goals	Apps	Goals
Astimacobi	1970–71	Serie D	5	1	0	0	–		5	1
Astimacobi	1971–72	Serie D	22	3	0	0	–		22	3
Astimacobi	Total		27	4	0	0	0	0	27	4
Fiorentina	1972–73	Serie A	20	2	8	0	1	0	29	2
Fiorentina	1973–74	Serie A	25	1	4	1	2	0	31	2
Fiorentina	1974–75	Serie A	29	4	9	1	4	0	42	5
Fiorentina	1975–76	Serie A	30	5	8	2	4	0	42	7
Fiorentina	1976–77	Serie A	28	4	4	0	4	0	36	4
Fiorentina	1977–78	Serie A	26	6	4	1	2	0	32	7
Fiorentina	1978–79	Serie A	27	0	4	0	–		31	0
Fiorentina	1979–80	Serie A	30	8	4	1	–		34	9
Fiorentina	1980–81	Serie A	27	9	6	0	–		33	9
Fiorentina	1981–82	Serie A	16	3	5	2	–		21	5
Fiorentina	1982–83	Serie A	27	9	5	0	2	1	34	10
Fiorentina	1983–84	Serie A	18	5	5	2	–		23	7
Fiorentina	1984–85	Serie A	0	0	0	0	0	0	0	0
Fiorentina	1985–86	Serie A	19	1	3	0	–		22	1
Fiorentina	1986–87	Serie A	19	4	0	0	–		19	4
Fiorentina	Total		341	61	69	10	19	1	429	72
Lausanne-Sport	1987–88	Nationalliga A	33	5	2	0	–		35	5
Lausanne-Sport	1988–89	Nationalliga A	18	2	1	1	–		19	3
Lausanne-Sport	Total		51	7	3	1	0	0	54	8
Career total			419	72	72	11	19	1	510	84

=== International ===
Appearances and goals by national team and year
National team	Year	Apps	Goals
Italy	1974	2	0
Italy	1975	7	0
Italy	1976	10	4
Italy	1977	7	2
Italy	1978	10	0
Italy	1979	4	0
Italy	1980	10	1
Italy	1981	8	0
Italy	1982	11	0
Italy	1983	4	0
Total		73	7

== Honours ==
Fiorentina

- Coppa Italia: 1974–75
- Anglo-Italian League Cup: 1975

Italy

- FIFA World Cup: 1982

Individual

- Sport Ideal European XI: 1980
- Guerin Sportivo All-Star Team: 1980
- Golden Foot "Football Legends": 2010
- ACF Fiorentina Hall of Fame: 2012
- Fiorentina All-Time XI
- Premio internazionale Giacinto Facchetti: 2016
- Italian Football Hall of Fame: 2018
