= Paolo Conti =

Italian footballer

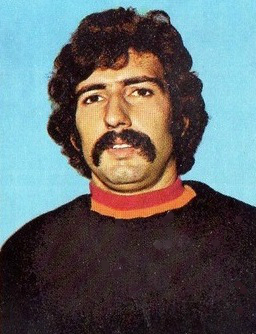

Personal information
- Date of birth: 1 April 1950 (age 76)
- Place of birth: Riccione, Italy
- Height: 1.85 m (6 ft 1 in)
- Position: Goalkeeper

Senior career*
Years	Team	Apps	(Gls)
1968–1970	Riccione	65	(0)
1970–1972	Modena	50	(0)
1972–1973	Arezzo	32	(0)
1973–1980	Roma	175	(0)
1980–1981	Verona	31	(0)
1981–1983	Sampdoria	39	(0)
1983–1984	Bari	34	(0)
1984–1988	Fiorentina	2	(0)
Total		428	(0)

International career
1976	Italy U-21	1	(0)
1977–1979	Italy	7	(0)
- * Club domestic league appearances and goals

Paolo Conti (pronunciation: [ˈpaːolo ˈkonti]; born 1 April 1950) is an Italian former footballer who played as a goalkeeper.

== Club career ==
Throughout his club career, Conti played for 9 seasons (193 games) in the Italian Serie A for A.S. Roma (1973–80), U.C. Sampdoria (1981–83), and ACF Fiorentina (1984–88), winning a Coppa Italia with Roma in 1980.

== International career ==
At international level, Conti played for the Italy national football team, and was a member of the 1978 FIFA World Cup squad which finished in fourth place, under manager Enzo Bearzot, serving as a back-up to Dino Zoff; in total he made seven appearances for Italy between 1977 and 1979.

== Style of play ==
Conti was a professional Italian goalkeeper and he was known for his skills with consistent performance. He was noted for his ability to stop shots and his calm demeanor during matches. He was also known for his tendency to leave the goal line to catch crosses or to intercept the ball from opposing players.

== Honours ==
=== Club ===
Roma

- Coppa Italia: 1979–80

Bari

- Serie C1: 1983–84
