= Giacomo Ferri =

Italian footballer and manager

Personal information
- Date of birth: 20 January 1959 (age 67)
- Place of birth: Crema, Italy
- Height: 1.75 m (5 ft 9 in)
- Position: Defender

Youth career
- 1972–1976: Crema
- 1976–1978: Torino

Senior career*
Years	Team	Apps	(Gls)
1975–1976	Crema	8	(0)
1976–1978	Torino	0	(0)
1978–1981	→ Reggina (loan)	84	(3)
1981–1989	Torino	208	(4)
1989–1993	Lecce	102	(0)
Total		402	(7)

Managerial career
- 1994–1997: Reggina
- 1998–2000: Torino (Giovanissimi)
- 2000–2001: Torino (Allievi)
- 2000–2003: Torino (Primavera)
- 2003: Torino (Assistant)
- 2003: Torino
- 2003–2005: Torino (Primavera)
- 2005: Casale
- 2010–2016: Torino (Team manager)
- * Club domestic league appearances and goals

Giacomo Ferri (born 20 January 1959) is an Italian football manager and former player, who played as a defender.

He is the brother of Riccardo, who was also a former player.

He is nicknamed Big Jim.

== Club career ==
Ferri began his playing career for Frassati in Lombardy, before he transferred to Crema in IV Serie. At age 16, he debuted for the first team, where he made eight appearances. He then transferred to Torino, where he passed through the youth ranks and the Primavera.

In 1978, he moved to Reggio Calabria where with Reggina he disputed three seasons in Serie C1. He returned to Torino in 1981, where he remained until relegation in 1989, when he moved to Lecce.

He accumulated 264 appearances and scored 4 goals in Serie A.

== Managerial career ==
Ferri started coaching the youth teams of Reggina before becoming assistant coach of the first team in the 1994–95 season, which gained promotion to Serie B.

His career as a coach is largely tied to Torino: as youth coach to first-team coach, the latter task covered in the closing months of the 2002–03 season. In 2005, he left Torino, arriving at Casale, where his tenure ended with a dismissal.

In 2010, he returned to Torino as the team manager. On 5 July 2016 he was succeeded by Luca Castellazzi.

== Honours ==
Individual

- Torino FC Hall of Fame: 2024
