= Léo Júnior =

Brazilian footballer (born 1954)

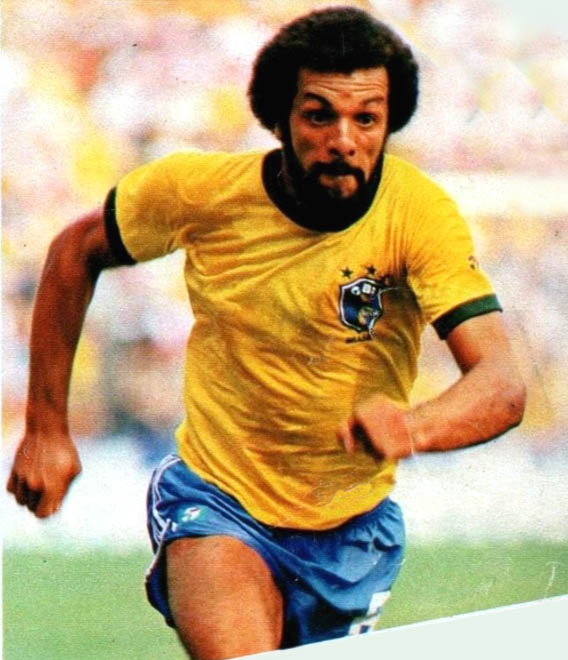
- Júnior in 1983

Personal information
- Full name: Leovegildo Lins da Gama Júnior
- Date of birth: 29 June 1954 (age 72)
- Place of birth: João Pessoa, Brazil
- Height: 1.72 m (5 ft 8 in)
- Positions: Left back; midfielder

Youth career
- 1973–1974: Flamengo

Senior career*
Years	Team	Apps	(Gls)
1974–1984	Flamengo	192	(7)
1984–1987	Torino	86	(12)
1987–1989	Pescara	62	(6)
1989–1993	Flamengo	70	(10)
Total		410	(35)

International career
1979–1992	Brazil	74	(6)
1993–2001	Brazil (beach)	?	(201)

Managerial career
- 1993–1994: Flamengo
- 1997: Flamengo
- 2003: Corinthians
- * Club domestic league appearances and goals

Leovegildo Lins da Gama Júnior (born 29 June 1954), also known as Maestro Júnior, Léo Júnior or simply Júnior, is a Brazilian football pundit and retired footballer who played as a left back or midfielder.

He was nicknamed "Capacete" ("helmet", in Portuguese) because of his afro hairstyle.

He was named by Pelé as one of the top 125 greatest living footballers in March 2004. Junior now works as a television pundit for Rede Globo.

== Club career ==
Léo Júnior played for Flamengo during the 1970s, 1980s and early 1990s, winning four Brazilian Championships (1980, 1982, 1983, 1992), the 1981 Copa Libertadores and 1981 Intercontinental Cup. With 857 matches, he is the player with most appearances for Flamengo.

On 12 June 1984 he was bought by Torino, for a fee of two million dollars. Léo Júnior asked and obtained a guarantee to play as a midfielder rather than a full-back, because he considered the former role less stressful, so to extend the life of his career. Although he was now thirty years old, after some initial difficulties, he succeeded in integrating in the formation coached by Luigi Radice, becoming the leader of the midfield. During his first year in Italy he was the victim of two incidents of racism: in Milan he was repeatedly insulted and spat upon as he left the stadium with his mother and father and in Turin, on the occasion of the derby, Juventus fans exhibited offensive banners on the colour of his skin. The Torino supporters responded promptly with another banner: "Better negro than a Juventus fan". At the end of the season, finished second behind Verona, he was awarded Serie A's player of the year.

During his time with "Toro" he was also given the affectionate nickname of "papà Júnior", due to his elder appearance. He remained in Turin until 1987, when he had a fallout with the manager Radice. The coach believed the performance of the Brazilian lower than that of the first season, while Léo Júnior was particularly annoyed for being substituted during a UEFA Cup tie against HNK Hajduk Split, which culminated with the elimination of the team.

He also played for Italian club Pescara between 1987 and 1989.

In early June 1991 he returned to Torino for a short spell on loan from Flamengo to bolster their team while participating in the Mitropa Cup. With Júnior in fine form, Torino won the tournament.

== International career ==
Léo Júnior competed in the men's tournament at the 1976 Summer Olympics.

He went on to record 74 appearances for the Brazil national team, between May 1979 and December 1992, scoring six goals. He appeared in both the 1982 and 1986 World Cup.

He also took part in many Beach Soccer World Championships as part of the Brazil national team, winning awards for top scorer and best player. Overall Léo Júnior played for Brazil beach soccer between 1993 and 2001, notching up 201 goals during those years, including 71 goals at the World Championships. He stopped playing to pursue the development of the sport. In 2019, he was crowned "Best Legend" at the 2019 Beach Soccer Stars awards and the magazine France Football placed Júnior fifth in an article named "10 Legends of Beach Soccer".

== Managerial career ==
Léo Júnior coached Flamengo from 1993 to 1994, and in 1997. He coached Corinthians from 1 October 2003 to 10 October 2003.

== Style of play ==
Léo Júnior was known for his technique and teamwork as well as his versatility, playing at left back and on the left side of midfield for Brazil due to his two footedness whilst often playing as a central midfielder or deep-lying playmaker at club level; he was also capable of playing on the right flank, and initially started out as an attacking right-back. He was as capable of "orchestrating attacking moves as fulfilling his defensive remit." In addition to his playmaking skills, he was highly regarded for his elegance, leadership, and tactical intelligence, as well as his ability to get forward, provide precise crosses for his teammates, or strike on goal. Moreover, he was also an accurate free kick and penalty taker.

== Personal life ==
Junior is married. His wife is Eloisa. They have three children: Viviana, Carolina, and son Rodrigo. The eldest, Rodrigo, was a professional footballer, winning the Rio de Janeiro Youth Championship in 2002. and then playing for Bangu and América. Viviana became a choreographer and dance teacher, and Carolina works as a stylist for the Globo TV channel.

In 1982, Junior recorded an album of songs called "Voa Canarinho", which went double platinum and sold 726,000 copies.

As a young man, Junior passed the university entrance exam in veterinary science, but chose football. Later, already a famous football player, he entered the Candido Mendes College, but studied there only until the second year.

== Career statistics ==
=== Club ===
Appearances and goals by club, season and competition
Club	Season	League			National cup (Note: Includes Copa do Brasil, Coppa Italia)		League cup		Continental		Total	
Club	Season	Division	Apps	Goals	Apps	Goals	Apps	Goals	Apps	Goals	Apps	Goals
Flamengo	1975	Série A	27	0								
Flamengo	1976	Série A	21	1								
Flamengo	1977	Série A	18	0								
Flamengo	1978	Série A	25	4								
Flamengo	1979	Série A	7	1								
Flamengo	1980	Série A	19	1								
Flamengo	1981	Série A	6	0								
Flamengo	1982	Série A	23	0								
Flamengo	1983	Série A	26	0								
Flamengo	1984	Série A	20	0								
Flamengo	Total		174	6								
Torino	1984–85	Serie A	26	7								
Torino	1985–86	Serie A	30	4								
Torino	1986–87	Serie A	30	1								
Torino	Total		86	12								
Pescara	1987–88	Serie A	28	3								
Pescara	1988–89	Serie A	34	3								
Pescara	Total		62	8								
Flamengo	1988	Série A	1	0								
Flamengo	1989	Série A	15	1	3	1						
Flamengo	1990	Série A	12	0	4	0						
Flamengo	1991	Série A	17	0								
Flamengo	1992	Série A	25	9								
Flamengo	1993	Série A	0	0	8	1						
Flamengo	Total		70	10	15	2						
Career total			410	35								

== Honours ==
=== Football ===
Flamengo

- Intercontinental Cup: 1981
- Libertadores Cup: 1981
- Campeonato Brasileiro Série A: 1980, 1982, 1983, 1992
- Brazil Cup 1990
- Campeonato Carioca: 1974, 1978, 1979 (Special), 1979, 1981, 1991

Torino

- Serie A runner-up: 1984–85

Brazil

- FIFA World Cup: round 2 (fifth place) 1982; quarter-finals (fifth place) 1986
- Copa América runner-up: 1983
- Mundialito runner-up: 1980

Individual

- Bola de Prata Brazilian Championship All-Star Team: 1980, 1983, 1984, 1991, 1992
- Bronze ball South American Player of the Year: 1981
- Guerin Sportivo All-Star Team: 1981
- FIFA World Cup All-Star Team: 1982
- World XI: 1982
- Serie A Team of The Year: 1985, 1988
- Serie A Player of the Year: 1985
- Bola de Ouro Brazilian Footballer of the Year: 1992
- South American Team of the Year: 1992
- FIFA 100: 2004

Records

- Most appearances in Flamengo's History – 857 apps

=== Beach soccer ===
Brazil

- Beach Soccer World Championship: 1995, 1996, 1997, 1998, 1999, 2000
- Copa América: 1994, 1995, 1996, 1997, 1998, 1999

Individual

- Beach Soccer World Championship top scorer: 1997 – 11 goals, 1998 – 14 goals, 1999 – 10 goals, 2000 – 13 goals
- Beach Soccer World Championship Best Player: 1995, 1997, 1998, 2000
- Beach Soccer Stars Legend Award: 2019
