= Silvano Martina =

Italian footballer

Personal information
- Full name: Silvano Martina
- Date of birth: 20 March 1953 (age 73)
- Place of birth: Sarajevo, FPR Yugoslavia
- Height: 1.83 m (6 ft 0 in)
- Position: Goalkeeper

Youth career
- –1966: Željezničar
- 1966–1969: Genovese
- 1969–1972: Esperia

Senior career*
Years	Team	Apps	(Gls)
1972–1977	Inter Milan	1	(0)
1974–1975	→ Sambenedettese (loan)	12	(0)
1975–1976	→ Varese (loan)	33	(0)
1977–1978	Brescia	9	(0)
1978–1984	Genoa	125	(0)
1979–1980	→ Varese (loan)	34	(0)
1984–1987	Torino	39	(0)
1987–1989	Lazio	58	(0)
1989–1990	Torino	6	(0)
1990–1991	Verona	0	(0)
Total		317	(0)
- * Club domestic league appearances and goals

Silvano Martina (born 20 March 1953) is an Italian retired professional footballer who played as a goalkeeper. He now works as an agent, notably for Gianluigi Buffon and has also worked for Nemanja Vidić during his career.

Martina was born in Sarajevo, SR Bosnia and Herzegovina, to Italian parents, then part of SFR Yugoslavia. He started his football career at hometown club Željezničar, before moving to Italy as a 13 year old in 1966 and then playing in the youth teams of Genovese and Esperia.

Martina made his Serie A debut for Inter Milan in a match against Palermo on 6 May 1973.

== Honours ==
=== Player ===
Torino

- Serie B: 1989–90
