= Giovanni Francini =

Italian footballer

Personal information
- Full name: Giovanni Francini
- Date of birth: 3 August 1963 (age 63)
- Place of birth: Massa, Italy
- Height: 1.80 m (5 ft 11 in)
- Position: Left back

Senior career*
Years	Team	Apps	(Gls)
1980–1987	Torino	111	(8)
1982–1983	→ Reggiana (loan)	30	(0)
1987–1994	Napoli	184	(10)
1994	Genoa	6	(0)
1994–1996	Brescia	30	(0)

International career
1984–1986	Italy U-21	12	(2)
1986–1990	Italy	8	(0)
- * Club domestic league appearances and goals

Giovanni Francini (Italian pronunciation: [dʒoˈvanni franˈtʃiːni]; born 3 August 1963) is a retired Italian footballer who played as a defender.

== Club career ==
During his club career Francini played for Torino (1978–87), making his debut in 1980, and during this period he was sent to Serie B side Reggiana on loan for the 1982–83 season, where he could not help the team avoid relegation to Serie C. During his time with the Turin club, he managed to reach three consecutive Coppa Italia finals between 1980 and 1982, also managing a second-place finish in Serie A in 1985, and he also made his European debut during his time at the club. He later played for Maradona's Napoli side (1987–1994), where he enjoyed another successful period. During this time, he won the Serie A, the Supercoppa Italiana, and the UEFA Cup, also reaching the Coppa Italia final. He moved to Genoa briefly in 1994, and subsequently to Brescia (1994–96), where he retired in 1996, at the age of 32, in Serie B.

== International career ==
Francini represented Italy at under-21 level on 12 occasions, scoring 2 goals, and reaching the final of the 1986 UEFA Under-21 European Championships under manager Cesare Maldini. He earned 8 senior caps for the Italy national football team under manager Azeglio Vicini between 1986 and 1990, and took part in the 1988 UEFA European Football Championship, where the Italians reached the semi-final of the tournament. Throughout his career, he received limited playing time for Italy, due to the presence of Antonio Cabrini, and later, Paolo Maldini in his role.

== Style of play ==
Francini primarily played as a left-sided fullback, where he excelled due to his pace, stamina, consistency, composure, and work-rate. He was also capable of playing as a man-marking centre-back, known as a "stopper," in Italian football jargon. Despite being known as a tenacious and hard-tackling defender, he was also known for his offensive capabilities as a full-back, due to his technique and crossing accuracy, as well as eye for goal, courtesy of his heading, ability to cut inside and shoot on goal with his stronger left foot, and his ability to make attacking runs into the penalty area. He also stood out for his leadership throughout his career.

== Honours ==
Napoli

- Serie A: 1989–90
- Supercoppa Italiana: 1990
- UEFA Cup: 1988–89
