= Stadio Partenio-Adriano Lombardi =

Stadium in Avellino, Italy

Coordinates: 40°55′37″N 14°47′33″E

Stadio Partenio-Lombardi
- Partenio
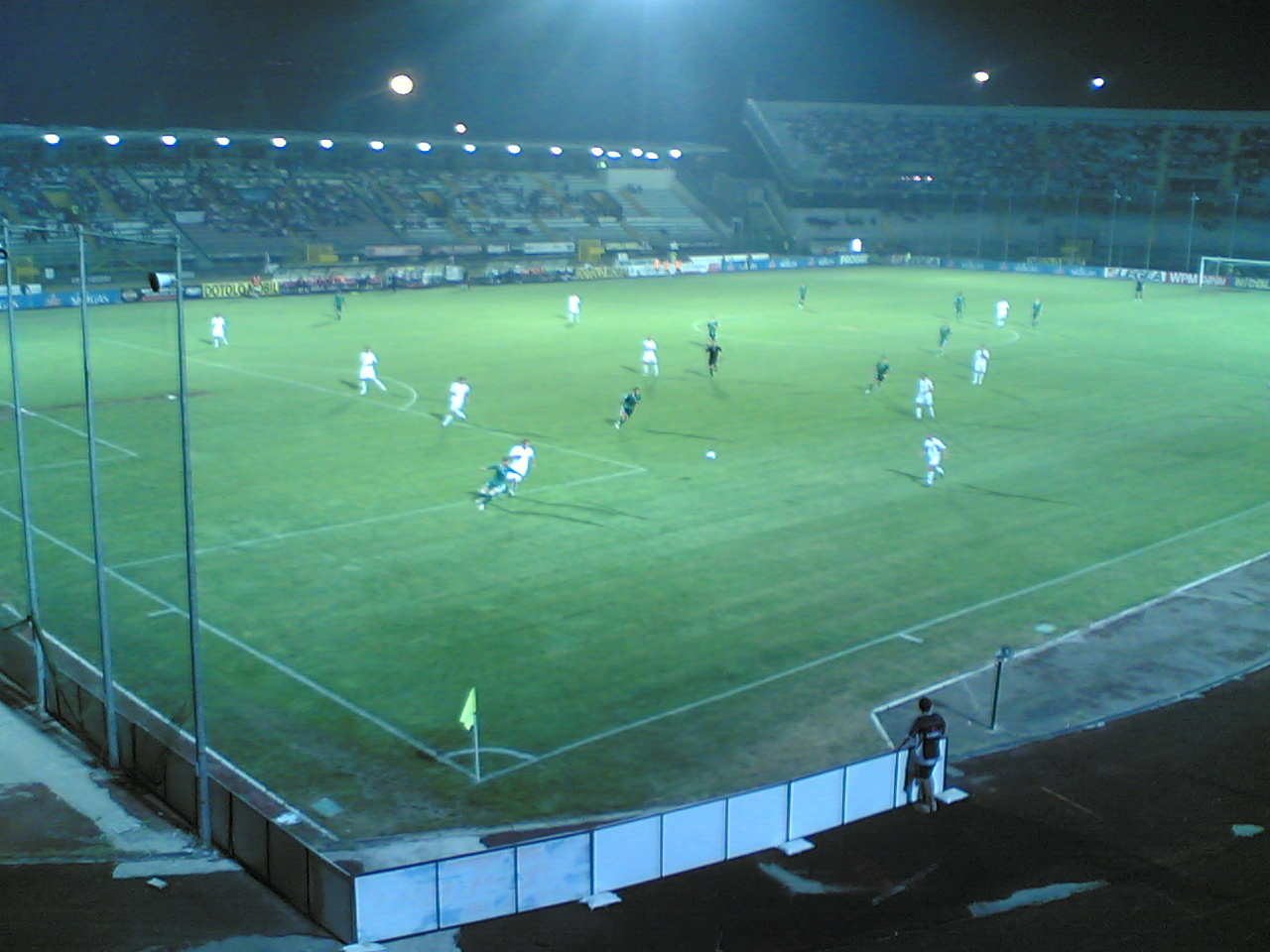
- Interactive map of Stadio Partenio-Lombardi
- Location: Avellino, Italy
- Owner: Municipality of Avellino
- Capacity: 26,000 (can be limited to 7,450)
- Surface: Grass; 105x68m

Construction
- Groundbreaking: 1970
- Opened: 1973

Tenant
- U.S. Avellino 1912

The Stadio Partenio-Lombardi is a multi-purpose stadium in Avellino, Italy. It is currently used mostly for football matches and is the home of U.S. Avellino 1912. The stadium was built in 1973 and holds 26,308.

On 9 June 2011 the stadium was dedicated to former Avellino player Adriano Lombardi.

== Notable matches ==
The Partenio hosted the second leg of the 1990 UEFA Cup Final between Fiorentina and Juventus. On 11 October 2002, the Italy national under-21 football team won in Partenio 4–1 against Serbia national under-21 football team.
