= 1999–2000 Reggina Calcio season =

Reggina Calcio
1999–2000 season
- Chairman: Pasquale Foti
- Manager: Franco Colomba
- Serie A: 12th
- Coppa Italia: Second round
- Top goalscorer: Mohamed Kallon (11)

Reggina Calcio made its Serie A debut in the 1999–00 season, ending the season in twelfth place for the southernmost team in the league at the time. The season also saw the definite breakthroughs of Roberto Baronio, Andrea Pirlo, and Mohamed Kallon, leading to all three players joining larger clubs in the summer. The performance also owed much to goalkeeper Massimo Taibi, returning from a poor spell at Manchester United.

== Squad ==
=== Goalkeepers ===
- (Italy) Massimo Taibi
- (Italy) Antonio Castelli
- (Italy) Emanuele Belardi

=== Defenders ===
- (Chile) Jorge Vargas
- (Italy) Bruno Cirillo
- (Italy) Maurizio Poli
- (Italy) Giovanni Morabito
- (Italy) Simone Giacchetta
- (Italy) Wladmiro Sbaglia
- (Italy) Paolo Foglio
- (Italy) Joseph Dayo Oshadogan
- (Italy) Lorenzo Stovini

=== Midfielders ===
- (Italy) Roberto Baronio
- (Italy) Massimo Campo
- (Italy) Francesco Cozza
- (Italy) Giandomenico Mesto
- (Italy) Salvatore Vicari
- (Italy) Ezio Brevi
- (Italy) Andrea Bernini
- (Italy) Riccardo Marroccolo
- (Ivory Coast) Serge Dié
- (Croatia) Nenad Pralija
- (Italy) Andrea Pirlo

=== Attackers ===
- (Sierra Leone) Mohamed Kallon
- (Italy) Alessandro Iannuzzi
- (Italy) Davide Possanzini
- (Albania) Erjon Bogdani
- (Argentina) Gustavo Reggi

== Serie A ==
Pos	Team	Pld	W	D	L	GF	GA	GD	Pts	Qualification or relegation
9	Hellas Verona	34	10	13	11	40	45	−5	43	
10	Perugia (Note: Perugia gained entry to the 2000 UEFA Intertoto Cup as Hellas Verona had declined to enter.)	34	12	6	16	36	52	−16	42	Qualification to Intertoto Cup second round
11	Reggina	34	9	13	12	31	42	−11	40 (Note: REG: 9 pts; BOL: 4 pts → BOL 2–0 LEC; LEC: 4 pts → LEC 1–1 BOL)	
12	Bologna	34	9	13	12	32	39	−7	40	
13	Lecce	34	10	10	14	33	49	−16	40	

Source: Serie A, RSSSF.com, Soccerway
Rules for classification: 1) Points; 2) Head-to-head points; 3) Head-to-head goal difference; 4) Goal difference; 5) Goals scored; 6) Draw. (Note: Head-to-head record is used only after all the matches between the teams in question have been played).

=== Matches ===
29 August 1999	Juventus	1–1	Reggina	Torino
	Inzaghi 31'	Report	47' Kallon	Stadium: Stadio delle Alpi; Attendance: 37,000

11 September 1999	Reggina	2–2	Fiorentina	Reggio Calabria
	Kallon 18' (pen.); Reggi 86'	Report	33' Firicano; 41' Heinrich	Stadium: Stadio Oreste Granillo; Attendance: 24,696

19 September 1999	Bologna	0–1	Reggina	Bologna
		Report	74' Possanzini	Stadium: Stadio Renato Dall'Ara; Attendance: 28,000

26 September 1999	Reggina	1–0	Piacenza	Reggio Calabria
	Cirillo 85'	Report		Stadium: Stadio Oreste Granillo; Attendance: 21,548

3 October 1999	Perugia	2–1	Reggina	Perugia
	Stovini 10' (o.g.); Nakata 28'	Report	47' Giacchetta	Stadium: Stadio Renato Curi; Attendance: 13,000

17 October 1999	Lecce	2–1	Reggina	Lecce
	Sesa 45'; Bonomi 75'	Report	41' (pen.) Baronio	Stadium: Stadio Via del Mare; Attendance: 14,060

24 October 1999	Reggina	2–2	Parma	Reggio Calabria
	Baronio 53'; Pirlo 59'	Report	1', 54' Crespo	Stadium: Stadio Oreste Granillo; Attendance: 24,000

31 October 1999	Udinese	3–2	Reggina	Udine
	Poggi 31', 80'; Fiore 74'	Report	55' Kallon; 87' Possanzini	Stadium: Stadio Friuli; Attendance: 18,000

7 November 1999	Reggina	0–4	Roma	Reggio Calabria
		Report	4' (o.g.) Oshadogan; 28' Montella; 39' Fábio Júnior; 45' Totti	Stadium: Stadio Oreste Granillo; Attendance: 25,500

21 November 1999	Bari	1–1	Reggina	Bari
	Andersson 96'	Report	12' Kallon	Stadium: Stadio San Nicola; Attendance: 14,600

28 November 1999	Reggina	0–1	Inter	Reggio Calabria
		Report	90' Recoba	Stadium: Stadio Oreste Granillo; Attendance: 27,272

5 December 1999	Venezia	2–0	Reggina	Venezia
	Maniero 56', 67'	Report		Stadium: Stadio Pier Luigi Penzo; Attendance: 8,435

12 December 1999	Reggina	1–1	Cagliari	Reggio Calabria
	Kallon 58'	Report	42' Mayélé	Stadium: Stadio Oreste Granillo; Attendance: 21,051

19 December 1999	Milan	2–2	Reggina	Milano
	Shevchenko 61', 74'	Report	30' Pirlo; 78' Kallon	Stadium: Stadio Giuseppe Meazza; Attendance: 55,000

6 January 2000	Reggina	2–1	Torino	Reggio Calabria
	Kallon 9', 90'	Report	56' Calaiò	Stadium: Stadio Oreste Granillo; Attendance: 24,000

9 January 2000	Verona	1–1	Reggina	Verona
	Adaílton 76'	Report	38' (o.g.) Frey	Stadium: Stadio Marcantonio Bentegodi; Attendance: 13,909

16 January 2000	Reggina	0–0	Lazio	Reggio Calabria
		Report		Stadium: Stadio Oreste Granillo; Attendance: 24,041

23 January 2000	Reggina	0–2	Juventus	Reggio Calabria
		Report	34' Kovačević; 64' Zidane	Stadium: Stadio Oreste Granillo; Attendance: 27,000

30 January 2000	Fiorentina	1–0	Reggina	Firenze
	Batistuta 51'	Report		Stadium: Stadio Artemio Franchi; Attendance: 35,000

6 February 2000	Reggina	1–0	Bologna	Reggio Calabria
	Pirlo 15'	Report		Stadium: Stadio Oreste Granillo; Attendance: 24,210

13 February 2000	Piacenza	0–0	Reggina	Piacenza
		Report		Stadium: Stadio Leonardo Garilli; Attendance: 11,000

19 February 2000	Reggina	1–1	Perugia	Reggio Calabria
	Baronio 51'	Report	45' Esposito	Stadium: Stadio Oreste Granillo; Attendance: 24,000

27 February 2000	Reggina	2–1	Lecce	Reggio Calabria
	Pirlo 22'; Kallon 41'	Report	71' Lucarelli	Stadium: Stadio Oreste Granillo; Attendance: 23,612

5 March 2000	Parma	3–0	Reggina	Parma
	Fuser 3'; Crespo 35', 45'	Report		Stadium: Stadio Ennio Tardini; Attendance: 18,000

12 March 2000	Reggina	0–0	Udinese	Reggio Calabria
		Report		Stadium: Stadio Oreste Granillo; Attendance: 23,503

19 March 2000	Roma	0–2	Reggina	Roma
		Report	29' Cozza; 86' Cirillo	Stadium: Stadio Olimpico; Attendance: 56,000

25 March 2000	Reggina	1–0	Bari	Reggio Calabria
	Kallon 24'	Report		Stadium: Stadio Oreste Granillo; Attendance: 24,196

2 April 2000	Inter	1–1	Reggina	Milano
	Recoba 14'	Report	82' Possanzini	Stadium: Stadio Giuseppe Meazza; Attendance: 62,000

9 April 2000	Reggina	1–0	Venezia	Reggio Calabria
	Bogdani 68'	Report		Stadium: Stadio Oreste Granillo; Attendance: 23,970

16 April 2000	Cagliari	0–1	Reggina	Cagliari
		Report	44' Cozza	Stadium: Stadio Sant'Elia; Attendance: 12,000

22 April 2000	Reggina	1–2	Milan	Reggio Calabria
	Pirlo 25'	Report	6' (o.g.) Vargas; 13' Shevchenko	Stadium: Stadio Oreste Granillo; Attendance: 26,000

30 April 2000	Torino	2–1	Reggina	Torino
	Galante 34'; Ferrante 82'	Report	75' (pen.) Kallon	Stadium: Stadio delle Alpi; Attendance: 21,000

7 May 2000	Reggina	1–1	Verona	Reggio Calabria
	Bogdani 25'	Report	57' Cammarata	Stadium: Stadio Oreste Granillo; Attendance: 25,060

14 May 2000	Lazio	3–0	Reggina	Roma
	Inzaghi 33'; Verón 37'; Simeone 59'	Report		Stadium: Stadio Olimpico; Attendance: 65,000

=== Coppa Italia ===
First round

15 August 1999 1	Cosenza	0–1	Reggina	Cosenza
		Report	93' Campo	Stadium: Stadio San Vito; Attendance: 6,660; Referee: Pellegrino (Barcellona Pozzo di Gotto)

18 August 1999 2	Reggina	3–0	Gualdo	Reggio Calabria
	Cozza 23' (pen.); Kallon 32'; Possanzini 59'	Report		Stadium: Stadio Oreste Granillo; Attendance: 7,768; Referee: Pirrone (Messina)

22 August 1999 3	Reggina	0–0	Treviso	Reggio Calabria
		Report		Stadium: Stadio Oreste Granillo; Attendance: 10,192; Referee: Paparesta (Bari)

25 August 1999 4	Treviso	0–0	Reggina	Treviso
		Report		Stadium: Stadio Omobono Tenni; Attendance: 2,997; Referee: Nucini (Bergamo)

1 September 1999 5	Reggina	1–0	Cosenza	Reggio Calabria
	Kallon 51'	Report		Stadium: Stadio Oreste Granillo; Attendance: 9,038; Referee: Strazzera (Trapani)

15 September 1999 6	Gualdo	0–3	Reggina	Gualdo
		Report	20' Kallon; 61' Oshadogan; 81' Possanzini	Stadium: Stadio Carlo Angelo Luzi; Attendance: 300; Referee: Tombolini (Ancona)

Second round

13 October 1999	Reggina	0–0	Piacenza	Reggio Calabria
		Report		Stadium: Stadio Oreste Granillo; Attendance: 7,118

27 October 1999	Piacenza	2–0	Reggina	Piacenza
	Rizzitelli 12'; Gautieri 79' (pen.)	Report		Stadium: Stadio Leonardo Garilli; Attendance: 2,000; Referee: Rosetti e Paparesta (Torino e Bari)

=== Topscorers ===
- (Sierra Leone) Mohamed Kallon 11
- (Italy) Andrea Pirlo 6
- (Italy) Davide Possanzini 3
- (Italy) Roberto Baronio 3

== Sources ==
- RSSSF – Italy 1999/00
