= Pioli =

Pioli is an Italian surname. Notable people with the surname include:

- Judy Pioli (born 1950), American actress, producer, writer and director
- Scott Pioli (born 1965), American football player and executive
- Stefano Pioli (born 1965), Italian footballer and manager

== See also ==
- Poli (surname)
