= Baronchelli =

Baronchelli is an Italian surname. Notable people with the surname include:

- Bruno Baronchelli (born 1957), French footballer
- Gaetano Baronchelli (born 1952), Italian racing cyclist
- Gianbattista Baronchelli (born 1953), Italian cyclist
- Giuseppe Baronchelli (born 1971), Italian footballer and manager
