= 1994–95 Brescia Calcio season =

Brescia Calcio
1994–95 season
- Chairman: Luigi Corioni
- Manager: Mircea Lucescu (until 19 February 1995); Luigi Maifredi (until 9 April 1995); Adelio Moro
- Stadium: Stadio Mario Rigamonti
- Serie A: 18th
- Coppa Italia: Second round
- Top goalscorer: Maurizio Neri (4)

During the 1994–95 Italian football season, Brescia Calcio competed in the Serie A and their first season in the top flight since the 1992–93 season.

== Summary ==
They also accumulated the league's lowest points total since the introduction of 3 points for a win with just 12 points, as well as the record for the second fewest wins in a Serie A season with just 2 victory in 34 games after Varese with 1 win in 1971–72 season. The season marked the debut match for future world-champion and multiple Serie A winner Andrea Pirlo.

== Squad ==
Note: Flags indicate national team as defined under FIFA eligibility rules; some limited exceptions apply. Players may hold more than one non-FIFA nationality.

Pos.	Nation	Player
GK	ITA	Marco Ballotta
GK	ITA	Ivan Gamberini
DF	ITA	Daniele Adani
DF	ITA	Giuseppe Baronchelli
DF	ITA	Sergio Battistini
DF	ITA	Stefano Bonometti
DF	ITA	Luca Brunetti
DF	ITA	Luigi Corino
DF	ITA	Giovanni Francini
DF	ITA	Nicola Marangon
MF	ITA	Davide Mezzanotti
MF	ITA	Gabriele Ambrosetti
MF	ITA	Roberto Baronio
MF	ITA	Ivano Bonetti
MF	ITA	Eugenio Corini

Pos.	Nation	Player
MF	ITA	Augusto Di Muri
MF	ITA	Fabio Gallo
MF	ITA	Salvatore Giunta
MF	ROU	Dănuţ Lupu
MF	ITA	Marco Piovanelli
MF	ITA	Andrea Pirlo
FW	ROU	Ioan Sabău
FW	ITA	Antonio Bernardi
FW	ITA	Stefano Borgonovo
FW	POR	Jorge Cadete
FW	ITA	Franco Lerda
FW	ITA	Marco Nappi
FW	ITA	Maurizio Neri
FW	ITA	Davide Ratti

== Competitions ==
=== Serie A ===
==== League table ====
Pos	Team	Pld	W	D	L	GF	GA	GD	Pts	Qualification or relegation
14	Padova	34	12	4	18	37	58	−21	40 (Note: winner of relegation tie-breaker 1-1*(5:4) vs Genoa. (10 June 1995))	Relegation tie-breaker
15	Genoa (R)	34	10	10	14	34	49	−15	40 (Note: Loser of relegation tie-breaker 1-1*(4:5) vs Padova. (10 June 1995). Relegated to 1995-96 Serie B)	Serie B after tie-breaker
16	Foggia (R)	34	8	10	16	32	50	−18	34	Relegation to Serie B
17	Reggiana (R)	34	4	6	24	24	56	−32	18	Relegation to Serie B
18	Brescia (R)	34	2	6	26	18	65	−47	12	Relegation to Serie B

Source: Serie A, RSSSF.com, Soccerway
Rules for classification: 1) Points; 2) Head-to-head points; 3) Head-to-head goal difference; 4) Goal difference; 5) Goals scored; 6) Draw. (Note: Head-to-head record is used only after all the matches between the teams in question have been played).
(R) Relegated

==== Matches ====
4 September 1994 1	Brescia	1–1	Juventus	Brescia
	Schenardi 80'	Report	55' Conte	Stadium: Mario Rigamonti; Referee: Braschi (Prato)

11 September 1994 2	Foggia	3–1	Brescia	Foggia
	De Vincenzo 23'; Biagioni 27' (pen.); Bresciani 39'	Report	71' Ambrosetti	Stadium: Stadio Pino Zaccheria; Referee: Treossi (Forlì)

18 September 1994 3	Brescia	0–0	Inter	Brescia
		Report		Stadium: Mario Rigamonti; Referee: Nicchi (Arezzo)

25 September 1994 4	Cagliari	2–0	Brescia	Cagliari
	Firicano 5'; Dely Valdés 40'	Report		Stadium: Stadio Sant'Elia; Referee: Quartuccio (Torre Annunziata)

2 October 1994 5	Milan	1–0	Brescia	Milan
	Simone 50'	Report		Stadium: Stadio Giuseppe Meazza; Referee: Bazzoli (Merano)

16 October 1994 6	Brescia	1–2	Genoa	Brescia
	Gallo 79'	Report	7' Skuhravý; 90' Delli Carri	Stadium: Mario Rigamonti; Referee: Pairetto (Nichelino)

23 October 1994 7	Torino	2–0	Brescia	Turin
	Pelé 58', 75'	Report		Stadium: delle Alpi; Referee: Rodomonti (Teramo)

30 October 1994 8	Brescia	2–4	Fiorentina	Brescia
	Gallo 70'; Ambrosetti 77'	Report	31' Batistuta; 41' Di Mauro; 62' Flachi; 76' Rui Costa	Stadium: Mario Rigamonti; Referee: Cesari

6 November 1994 9	Padova	2–0	Brescia	Padua
	Kreek 70'; Coppola 84'	Report		Stadium: Stadio Euganeo; Referee: Franceschini

20 November 1994 10	Brescia	0–0	Roma	Brescia
		Report		Stadium: Mario Rigamonti; Referee: Bettin

27 November 1994 11	Brescia	1–2	Bari	Brescia
	Neri 72'	Report	47' Tovalieri; 57' (o.g.) Baronchelli	Stadium: Mario Rigamonti; Referee: Collina

4 December 1994 12	Parma	4–0	Brescia	Parma
	Crippa 45'; Zola 59', 65'; Dino Baggio 85'	Report		Stadium: Stadio Ennio Tardini; Referee: Borriello

11 December 1994 13	Brescia	0–0	Sampdoria	Brescia
		Report		Stadium: Mario Rigamonti; Referee: Rosica

18 December 1994 14	Napoli	1–1	Brescia	Naples
	Andre Cruz 78'	Report	22' Corini	Stadium: San Paolo; Referee: Tombolini

8 January 1995 15	Brescia	1–0	Reggiana	Brescia
	Lupu 29'	Report		Stadium: Mario Rigamonti; Referee: Nicchi

15 January 1995 16	Cremonese	0–0	Brescia	Cremona
		Report		Stadium: Stadio Giovanni Zini; Referee: Cardona

22 January 1995 17	Brescia	0–1	Lazio	Brescia
		Report	27' Boksic	Stadium: Mario Rigamonti; Referee: Boggi

29 January 1995 18	Juventus	2–1	Brescia	Turin
	Del Piero 34'; Vialli 89' (pen.)	Report	Corini 10' (pen.)	Stadium: delle Alpi; Referee: Racalbuto

12 February 1995 19	Brescia	1–0	Foggia	Brescia
	Battistini 90'	Report		Stadium: Mario Rigamonti; Referee: Stafoggia

19 February 1995 20	Inter	1–0	Brescia	Milan
	Berti 3'	Report		Stadium: Stadio Giuseppe Meazza; Referee: Amendolia

26 February 1995 21	Brescia	2–3	Cagliari	Brescia
	Cadete 12'; Battistini 62'	Report	55' Oliveira; 83' Muzzi; 85' Herrera	Stadium: Mario Rigamonti; Referee: Quartuccio

5 March 1995 22	Brescia	0–5	Milan	Brescia
		Report	45' Simone; 56' Simone; 69' Simone; 73' Maldini; 84' Stroppa	Stadium: Mario Rigamonti; Referee: Pellegrino

12 March 1995 23	Genoa	1–0	Brescia	Genoa
	Skuhravý 90'	Report		Stadium: Stadio Luigi Ferraris; Referee: Nicchi (Arezzo)

19 March 1995 24	Brescia	1–4	Torino	Brescia
	Neri 41'	Report	7' Pelé; 18' Rizzitelli; 25', 49' (pen.) Silenzi	Stadium: Mario Rigamonti; Referee: Cardona (Milan)

2 April 1995 25	Fiorentina	4–0	Brescia	Florence
	Di Mauro 4'; Batistuta 11'; Rui Costa 58'; Flachi 88'	Report		Stadium: Stadio Comunale; Referee: Lana (Turin)

9 April 1995 26	Brescia	1–3	Padova	Brescia
	Lalas 5' (o.g.)	Report	3' Galderisi; 64' Maniero; 84' Kreek	Stadium: Mario Rigamonti; Referee: Pairetto (Nichelino)

15 April 1995 27	Roma	3–0	Brescia	Rome
	Totti 5'; Cappioli 18'; Balbo 79' (pen.)	Report		Stadium: Stadio Olimpico; Referee: Farina (Novi Ligure)

23 April 1995 28	Bari	3–0	Brescia	Bari
	Amoruso 39'; Protti 51'; Guerrero 71'	Report		Stadium: Stadio San Nicola; Referee: De Prisco (Nocera Inferiore)

29 April 1995 29	Brescia	1–2	Parma	Brescia
	Neri 21'	Report	7', 77' (pen.) Zola	Stadium: Mario Rigamonti; Referee: Beschin (Legnago)

7 May 1995 30	Sampdoria	2–1	Brescia	Genoa
	Platt 86' (pen.), 90'	Report	2' Baronchelli	Stadium: Stadio Luigi Ferraris; Referee: De Santis (Tivoli)

14 May 1995 31	Brescia	1–2	Napoli	Brescia
	Gallo 82'	Report	38' Imbriani; 49' Agostini	Stadium: Mario Rigamonti; Referee: Tombolini (Ancona)

21 May 1995 32	Reggiana	2–0	Brescia	Reggio Emilia
	Esposito 34'; Oliseh 83'	Report		Stadium: Stadio Giglio; Referee: Pacifici (Rome)

28 May 1995 33	Brescia	1–2	Cremonese	Brescia
	Neri 12'	Report	29' Tentoni; 53' (pen.) Chiesa	Stadium: Mario Rigamonti; Referee: Trentalange (Turin)

4 June 1995 34	Lazio	1–0	Brescia	Rome
	Colucci 90'	Report		Stadium: Stadio Olimpico; Referee: Dinelli (Lucca)

Source:RSSSF

=== Coppa Italia ===
Second round

31 August 1994	Reggiana	1–0	Brescia	Reggio Emilia

21 September 1994	Brescia	0–2	Reggiana	Brescia
				Stadium: Mario Rigamonti

== Statistics ==
=== Squad statistics ===
No.	Pos	Nat	Player	Total		Serie A	
No.	Pos	Nat	Player	Apps	Goals	Apps	Goals
	GK	(Italy) ITA	Marco Ballotta	32	-60	32	-60
	DF	(Italy) ITA	Daniele Adani	20	0	20	0
	DF	(Italy) ITA	Giuseppe Baronchelli	27	1	27	1
	DF	(Italy) ITA	Sergio Battistini	19	2	19	2
	DF	(Italy) ITA	Giovanni Francini	17	0	17	0
	DF	(Italy) ITA	Stefano Bonometti	19	0	19	0
	MF	(Italy) ITA	Fabio Gallo	31	3	31	3
	MF	(Italy) ITA	Marco Schenardi	26	1	26	1
	MF	(Italy) ITA	Salvatore Giunta	24	0	24	0
	MF	(Italy) ITA	Eugenio Corini	24	2	24	2
	FW	(Italy) ITA	Maurizio Neri	31	4	31	4
	FW	(Portugal) POR	Jorge Cadete	13	1	13	1
	MF	(Italy) ITA	Marco Piovanelli	19	0	19	0
	DF	(Italy) ITA	Nicola Marangon	17	0	17	0
	MF	(Italy) ITA	Ivano Bonetti	16	0	16	0
	MF	(Italy) ITA	Davide Mezzanotti	15	0	15	0
	MF	(Romania) ROU	Dănuţ Lupu	15	1	15	1
	FW	(Italy) ITA	Stefano Borgonovo	14	0	14	0
	FW	(Romania) ROU	Ioan Sabău	12	0	12	0
	FW	(Italy) ITA	Marco Nappi	11	0	11	0
	MF	(Italy) ITA	Augusto Di Muri	9	0	9	0
	MF	(Italy) ITA	Gabriele Ambrosetti	9	2	9	2
	DF	(Italy) ITA	Luca Brunetti	6	0	6	0
	MF	(Italy) ITA	Roberto Baronio	5	0	5	0
	FW	(Italy) ITA	Antonio Bernardi	4	0	4	0
	GK	(Italy) ITA	Ivan Gamberini	2	-5	2	-5
	FW	(Italy) ITA	Franco Lerda	2	0	2	0
	DF	(Italy) ITA	Luigi Corino	1	0	1	0
	MF	(Italy) ITA	Andrea Pirlo	1	0	1	0
	FW	(Italy) ITA	Davide Ratti				
