= 1993–94 Anglo-Italian Cup =

European football competition

The 1993–94 Anglo-Italian Cup was the sixth Anglo-Italian Cup competition. The European football competition was played between eight clubs from England and eight clubs from Italy. Italian side Brescia lifted the trophy after beating English side Notts County 1–0.

== Preliminary Round ==
Group 1

| Team | Pts | Pld | W | D | L | F | A | GD |
|---|---|---|---|---|---|---|---|---|
| Bolton Wanderers | 6 | 2 | 2 | 0 | 0 | 4 | 1 | +3 |
| Sunderland | 3 | 2 | 1 | 0 | 1 | 2 | 2 | 0 |
| Tranmere Rovers | 0 | 2 | 0 | 0 | 2 | 1 | 4 | –3 |

31 August 1993Sunderland 2–0 Tranmere Rovers

7 September 1993Tranmere Rovers 1–2 Bolton Wanderers

14 September 1993Bolton Wanderers 2–0 Sunderland

Group 2

| Team | Pts | Pld | W | D | L | F | A | GD |
|---|---|---|---|---|---|---|---|---|
| Middlesbrough | 3 | 2 | 1 | 0 | 1 | 4 | 2 | +2 |
| Grimsby Town | 3 | 2 | 1 | 0 | 1 | 3 | 3 | 0 |
| Barnsley | 3 | 2 | 1 | 0 | 1 | 2 | 4 | –2 |

31 August 1993Grimsby Town 2–1 Middlesbrough

7 September 1993Middlesbrough 3–0 Barnsley

14 September 1993Barnsley 2–1 Grimsby Town

Group 3

| Team | Pts | Pld | W | D | L | F | A | GD |
|---|---|---|---|---|---|---|---|---|
| Notts County | 4 | 2 | 1 | 1 | 0 | 4 | 3 | +1 |
| Derby County | 3 | 2 | 1 | 0 | 1 | 5 | 5 | 0 |
| Nottingham Forest | 1 | 2 | 0 | 1 | 1 | 3 | 4 | –1 |

31 August 1993Notts County 3–2 Derby County

8 September 1993Derby County 3–2 Nottingham Forest

15 September 1993Nottingham Forest 1–1 Notts County

Group 4

| Team | Pts | Pld | W | D | L | F | A | GD |
|---|---|---|---|---|---|---|---|---|
| West Bromwich Albion | 4 | 2 | 1 | 1 | 0 | 3 | 1 | +2 |
| Peterborough United | 3 | 2 | 1 | 0 | 1 | 5 | 6 | –1 |
| Leicester City | 1 | 2 | 0 | 1 | 1 | 3 | 4 | –1 |

31 August 1993Peterborough United 4–3 Leicester City

8 September 1993Leicester City 0–0 West Bromwich Albion

15 September 1993West Bromwich Albion 3–1 Peterborough United

Group 5

| Team | Pts | Pld | W | D | L | F | A | GD |
|---|---|---|---|---|---|---|---|---|
| Stoke City | 4 | 2 | 1 | 1 | 0 | 5 | 3 | +2 |
| Wolverhampton Wanderers | 2 | 2 | 0 | 2 | 0 | 5 | 5 | 0 |
| Birmingham City | 1 | 2 | 0 | 1 | 1 | 2 | 4 | –2 |

31 August 1993Wolverhampton Wanderers 3–3 Stoke City

7 September 1993Stoke City 2–0 Birmingham City

14 September 1993Birmingham City 2–2 Wolverhampton Wanderers

Group 6

| Team | Pts | Pld | W | D | L | F | A | GD |
|---|---|---|---|---|---|---|---|---|
| Portsmouth | 6 | 2 | 2 | 0 | 0 | 5 | 1 | +4 |
| Bristol City | 3 | 2 | 1 | 0 | 1 | 3 | 4 | –1 |
| Oxford United | 0 | 2 | 0 | 0 | 2 | 1 | 4 | –3 |

31 August 1993Portsmouth 3–1 Bristol City

7 September 1993Bristol City 2–1 Oxford United

14 September 1993Oxford United 0–2 Portsmouth

Group 7

| Team | Pts | Pld | W | D | L | F | A | GD |
|---|---|---|---|---|---|---|---|---|
| Southend United | 4 | 2 | 1 | 1 | 0 | 4 | 1 | +3 |
| Watford | 3 | 2 | 1 | 0 | 1 | 2 | 4 | –2 |
| Luton Town | 1 | 2 | 0 | 1 | 1 | 2 | 3 | –1 |

31 August 1993Watford 2–1 Luton Town

7 September 1993Luton Town 1–1 Southend United

14 September 1993Southend United 3–0 Watford

Group 8

| Team | Pts | Pld | W | D | L | F | A | GD |
|---|---|---|---|---|---|---|---|---|
| Charlton Athletic | 4 | 2 | 1 | 1 | 0 | 6 | 3 | +3 |
| Crystal Palace | 3 | 2 | 1 | 0 | 1 | 4 | 4 | 0 |
| Millwall | 1 | 2 | 0 | 1 | 1 | 2 | 5 | –3 |

1 September 1993Millwall 2–2 Charlton Athletic

7 September 1993Charlton Athletic 4–1 Crystal Palace

15 September 1993Crystal Palace 3–0 Millwall

== Group stage ==
| Group | England | Italy |
|---|---|---|
| A | Bolton Wanderers; Charlton Athletic; Middlesbrough; Notts County | Ancona; Ascoli; Brescia; Pisa |
| B | Portsmouth; Southend United; Stoke City; West Bromwich Albion | Cosenza; Fiorentina; Padova; Pescara |

=== Group A matches ===
12 October 1993

| Bolton Wanderers | 5 – 0 | Ancona |

12 October 1993

| Brescia | 2 – 0 | Charlton Athletic |

12 October 1993

| Notts County | 4 – 2 | Ascoli |

12 October 1993

| Pisa | 3 – 1 | Middlesbrough |

9 November 1993

| Ancona | 1 – 1 | Charlton Athletic |

9 November 1993

| Bolton Wanderers | 3 – 3 | Brescia |

9 November 1993

| Notts County | 3 – 2 | Pisa |

16 November 1993

| Brescia | 3 – 1 | Notts County |

16 November 1993

| Charlton Athletic | 0 – 3 | Ascoli |

16 November 1993

| Middlesbrough | 0 – 0 | Ancona |

16 November 1993

| Pisa | 1 – 1 | Bolton Wanderers |

24 November 1993

| Ascoli | 3 – 0 | Middlesbrough |

22 December 1993

| Ancona | 0 – 1 | Notts County |

22 December 1993

| Ascoli | 1 – 1 | Bolton Wanderers |

22 December 1993

| Charlton Athletic | 0 – 3 | Pisa |

22 December 1993

| Middlesbrough | 0 – 1 | Brescia |

==== Group A table ====
| Team | Pld | W | D | L | GF | GA | GD | Pts |
|---|---|---|---|---|---|---|---|---|
| Brescia | 4 | 3 | 1 | 0 | 9 | 4 | +5 | 10 |
| Notts County | 4 | 3 | 0 | 1 | 9 | 7 | +2 | 9 |
| Ascoli | 4 | 2 | 1 | 1 | 9 | 5 | +4 | 7 |
| Pisa | 4 | 2 | 1 | 1 | 9 | 5 | +4 | 7 |
| Bolton Wanderers | 4 | 1 | 3 | 0 | 10 | 5 | +5 | 6 |
| Ancona | 4 | 0 | 2 | 2 | 1 | 7 | –6 | 2 |
| Middlesbrough | 4 | 0 | 1 | 3 | 7 | 10 | –6 | 1 |
| Charlton Athletic | 4 | 0 | 1 | 3 | 1 | 10 | –9 | 1 |

=== Group B matches ===
12 October 1993

| Fiorentina | 3 – 0 | Southend United |

12 October 1993

| Padova | 0 – 0 | Portsmouth |

12 October 1993

| Stoke City | 2 – 1 | Cosenza |

12 October 1993

| West Bromwich Albion | 1 – 2 | Pescara |

9 November 1993

| Cosenza | 1 – 2 | Southend United |

9 November 1993

| Pescara | 2 – 1 | Portsmouth |

9 November 1993

| West Bromwich Albion | 3 – 4 | Padova |

10 November 1993

| Stoke City | 0 – 0 | Fiorentina |

16 November 1993

| Fiorentina | 2 – 0 | West Bromwich Albion |

16 November 1993

| Padova | 3 – 0 | Stoke City |

16 November 1993

| Portsmouth | 3 – 0 | Cosenza |

16 November 1993

| Southend United | 1 – 3 | Pescara |

22 December 1993

| Cosenza | 2 – 1 | West Bromwich Albion |

22 December 1993

| Pescara | 2 – 1 | Stoke City |

22 December 1993

| Portsmouth | 2 – 3 | Fiorentina |

22 December 1993

| Southend United | 5 – 2 | Padova |

==== Group B table ====
| Team | Pld | W | D | L | GF | GA | GD | Pts |
|---|---|---|---|---|---|---|---|---|
| Pescara | 4 | 4 | 0 | 0 | 9 | 4 | +5 | 12 |
| Fiorentina | 4 | 3 | 1 | 0 | 8 | 2 | +6 | 10 |
| Padova | 4 | 2 | 1 | 1 | 9 | 8 | +1 | 7 |
| Southend United | 4 | 2 | 0 | 2 | 8 | 9 | –1 | 6 |
| Portsmouth | 4 | 1 | 1 | 2 | 6 | 5 | +1 | 4 |
| Stoke City | 4 | 1 | 1 | 2 | 3 | 6 | –3 | 4 |
| Cosenza | 4 | 1 | 0 | 3 | 4 | 8 | –4 | 3 |
| West Bromwich Albion | 4 | 0 | 0 | 4 | 5 | 10 | –5 | 0 |

== Semi-finals ==
English semi-final

26 January 1994

| Southend United | 1 – 0 | Notts County |

16 February 1994

| Notts County | 1 – 0 (4 – 3 pens) | Southend United |

Italian semi-final

26 January 1994

| Brescia | 1 – 0 | Pescara |

15 February 1994

| Pescara | 3 – 2 | Brescia |

Brescia win on away goal rule

== Final ==
20 March 1994

| Brescia (Italy) | 1 – 0 | Notts County (England) |
|---|---|---|
| Ambrosetti 65' | Report |

Wembley Stadium

Brescia:
| GK | 1 | (Italy) Marco Landucci |
| DF | 2 | (Italy) Nicola Marangon |
| DF | 5 | (Italy) Sergio Domini |
| DF | 6 | (Italy) Giuseppe Baronchelli |
| DF | 3 | (Italy) Stefano Bonometti |
| MF | 4 | (Italy) Salvatore Giunta |
| MF | 7 | (Italy) Marco Schenardi | (substituted off) 46' |
| MF | 8 | (Romania) Ioan Sabău |
| MF | 9 | (Italy) Gabriele Ambrosetti | (substituted off) 75' |
| FW | 10 | (Romania) Gheorghe Hagi |
| FW | 11 | (Italy) Fabio Gallo |
Substitutes:
| FW | 14 | (Italy) Maurizio Neri | | (substituted on) 46' |
| MF | 15 | (Italy) Marco Piovanelli | | (substituted on) 75' |
Manager:
(Romania) Mircea Lucescu

Notts County
| GK | 1 | (England) Steve Cherry |
| DF | 2 | (Northern Ireland) Kevin Wilson |
| DF | 3 | (Netherlands) Meindert Dijkstra |
| DF | 4 | (England) Phil Turner |
| DF | 5 | (Jamaica) Michael Johnson |
| MF | 6 | (England) Charlie Palmer |
| MF | 7 | (Scotland) Paul Devlin |
| MF | 8 | (England) Mark Draper |
| FW | 9 | (England) Gary Lund |
| FW | 10 | (Scotland) Gary McSwegan | (substituted on) 71' |
| MF | 11 | (Wales) Andy Legg |
Substitutes:
| FW | 12 | (England) Tony Agana | (substituted on) 71' |
Manager:
(England) Mick Walker
