= Andrea Pirlo =

Italian football player and manager (born 1979)

Andrea Pirlo Ufficiale OMRI
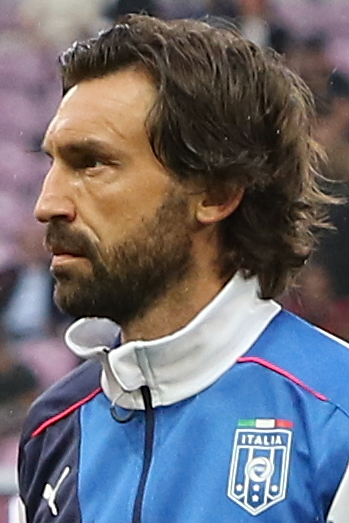
- Pirlo in 2015

Personal information
- Date of birth: 19 May 1979 (age 47)
- Place of birth: Flero, Italy
- Height: 1.77 m (5 ft 10 in)
- Position: Midfielder

Team information
- Current team: United (head coach)

Youth career
- 1985–1988: Flero
- 1988–1992: Voluntas Brescia
- 1992–1995: Brescia

Senior career*
Years	Team	Apps	(Gls)
1995–1998	Brescia	47	(6)
1998–2001	Inter Milan	22	(0)
1999–2000	→ Reggina (loan)	28	(6)
2001	→ Brescia (loan)	10	(0)
2001–2011	AC Milan	284	(32)
2011–2015	Juventus	119	(16)
2015–2017	New York City FC	60	(1)
Total		570	(61)

International career
1994	Italy U15	3	(0)
1995	Italy U16	6	(2)
1995	Italy U17	4	(0)
1995–1997	Italy U18	18	(7)
1998–2002	Italy U21	37	(15)
2000–2004	Italy Olympic (O.P.)	9	(1)
2002–2015	Italy	116	(13)

Managerial career
- 2020: Juventus U23
- 2020–2021: Juventus
- 2022–2023: Fatih Karagümrük
- 2023–2024: Sampdoria
- 2025–: United
Medal record
Men's football
Representing Italy
FIFA World Cup
Winner	2006 Germany
UEFA European Championship
Runner-up	2012 Poland–Ukraine
FIFA Confederations Cup
Bronze medal – third place	2013 Brazil
Summer Olympics
Bronze medal – third place	2004 Athens
UEFA European Under-21 Championship
Winner	2000 Slovakia
Bronze medal – third place	2002 Switzerland
- * Club domestic league appearances and goals

Andrea Pirlo Ufficiale OMRI (Italian pronunciation: [anˈdrɛːa ˈpirlo]; born 19 May 1979) is an Italian football manager and former player who is currently the head coach of UAE Pro League club United. Widely considered one of the greatest midfielders of all time, Pirlo was known for his vision, technique, creativity, passing, and free kick ability. He is the all-time Italian top assist provider in the UEFA Champions League (15).

Pirlo began his club career in 1995 as an attacking midfielder with his hometown club Brescia, winning the Serie B in 1997. He signed for Serie A club Inter Milan a year later, but limited game time and loans away from the club saw him transfer to cross-city rivals AC Milan in 2001. There, Pirlo matured into a world-class player in a deep-lying playmaker role, winning two Serie A titles, two Champions Leagues, two UEFA Super Cups, a FIFA Club World Cup, a Coppa Italia, and a Supercoppa Italiana. He departed for Juventus in 2011, where he won four consecutive Serie A titles, two Supercoppa Italiana titles, and another Coppa Italia. In 2015, Pirlo joined Major League Soccer (MLS) club New York City FC, where he played for two years before retiring in 2017.

At the international level, Pirlo played 116 matches for the Italy national football team, which is the seventh-most of all time. He made his senior debut in 2002 and captained his nation to a bronze medal in the 2004 Olympics. Pirlo was instrumental in Italy's triumph at the 2006 FIFA World Cup, winning the Bronze Ball and being elected to the Team of the Tournament. He repeated similar success as he led Italy to the UEFA Euro 2012 final. Pirlo also represented his country at the 2004 and 2008 UEFA European Championships, the 2010 and 2014 FIFA World Cups, and the 2009 and 2013 FIFA Confederations Cups.

Pirlo finished in the top four five times in the IFFHS World's Best Playmaker award between 2006 and 2015. He placed fourth for UEFA Best Player in Europe in 2011, and seventh in 2015. He was named Serie A Footballer of the Year three times and voted to the Serie A Team of the Year four times. Pirlo was elected to UEFA Team of the Year in 2012, the UEFA Champions League Squad of the Season in 2015, and was part of the FIFPro World XI in 2006. He also placed seventh for the 2007 FIFA World Player, finished in the top ten three times for the Ballon d'Or, and was named an MLS All-Star in 2016. In 2019, Pirlo was elected into the Italian Football Hall of Fame.

== Club career ==
=== Brescia, Inter Milan and Reggina ===
==== 1992–2001: Early years and realisation of role ====
Pirlo was born in Flero in the province of Brescia. He began his career with the Flero youth team, later moving to Voluntas, and subsequently joined the youth sector of local club Brescia in 1992, where he initially played predominantly as a supporting forward. In 1995, at the age of 16, Pirlo made his Serie A debut for Brescia against Reggiana, on 21 May, becoming Brescia's youngest player to make an appearance in Serie A. He was promoted by his coach Mircea Lucescu. The following season, he did not appear with the senior team, although he was able to capture the Torneo di Viareggio with the youth team. After breaking into the Brescia first team during the 1996–97 Serie B season, he helped the club to gain Serie A promotion the following season by winning the Serie B title. He scored his first goal in Serie A during the 1997–98 season, in a 4–0 home win over Vicenza on 19 October 1997.

Due to his performances with Brescia, Pirlo was spotted by Inter Milan and signed in the summer of 1998, reuniting with former Brescia coach Lucescu in his first season when the Romanian replaced Luigi Simoni in December. Pirlo was unable to break into the first squad permanently, however, and Inter finished eighth in the 1998–99 Serie A campaign. Inter loaned Pirlo to Reggina for the 1999–2000 season, alongside fellow youngster Mohamed Kallon. After an impressive season, he returned to Inter but was once again unable to break into the first team, making just four league appearances. He spent the second half of the 2000–01 season on loan at his former club, Brescia, where he played alongside his childhood idol, offensive playmaker Roberto Baggio. As Baggio occupied the attacking midfield role for Brescia, manager Carlo Mazzone made a ground-breaking decision, becoming the first coach to deploy Pirlo as a deep-lying playmaker, rather than as an offensive midfielder, a deeper creative role in which he particularly excelled, due to his long passing ability. Despite initially struggling against relegation that season, Brescia would eventually manage a comfortable seventh-place finish in Serie A, also reaching the Coppa Italia quarter-finals, qualifying for the 2001 Intertoto Cup. A notable moment in Pirlo's Brescia career was his long pass which assisted Baggio's late equaliser against Juventus at the Stadio delle Alpi, on 1 April 2001.

=== AC Milan ===
==== 2001–2004: Domestic and European success ====
After three seasons on the Inter books, Pirlo was sold to rivals AC Milan for 33 billion Italian lire (€17,043,078) on 30 June 2001, the last day of the 2000–01 financial year. The transfer fee was partially funded by the movement of Dražen Brnčić in the opposite direction for an undisclosed fee. In the same window Inter swapped Cristian Brocchi (25 billion lire; €12.9 million) for Guly (undisclosed fee; €8.537 million profit) and Matteo Bogani for Paolo Ginestra. The deals were later reported by the Italian press to have been undertaken to create "false profit" by inflating the players' values in the transfer fees in the swap deal. The exchange involving Ginestra and Bogani created an approximate €3.5 million "profit" for both clubs, but this actually manifested itself in terms of useless registration rights.

It was at Milan, in particular under manager Carlo Ancelotti, where Pirlo made big strides in developing into a world class player, and one of the best deep-lying playmakers and set-piece specialists in the world, as he went on to achieve notable domestic and international success during his time with the club. Pirlo later recalled the period he has spent in Milan with Ancelotti: "He changed my career, putting me in front of the defence. We shared some unforgettable moments. We had a magnificent past together." After Mazzone's pioneering decision to move Pirlo into a deep-seated playmaking role with Brescia during the previous season, Milan managers Fatih Terim and, in particular, Carlo Ancelotti further developed this role for him at Milan. In Ancelotti's 4–3–1–2 and 4–3–2–1 formations, Pirlo was deployed as a deep-lying playmaker in front of the defence, which allowed him to play alongside other talented attacking midfielders, such as Rivaldo, Rui Costa and eventually Kaká, replacing the gap left by Milan legend Demetrio Albertini in the deep midfield playmaking role. He would become an integral part of the Rossoneri's midfield, forming a formidable partnership with Gennaro Gattuso, as well as with Clarence Seedorf and Massimo Ambrosini, who also supported his playmaking role defensively. Pirlo was given the nickname the metronome during his time at the club, for the way in which he set the team's rhythm.

Pirlo made his Milan debut on 20 September 2001, in a 2–0 win over BATE Borisov in the UEFA Cup, after coming on for Massimo Donati. During his first season with the club, he helped the team to a fourth-place finish UEFA Champions League qualification spot, also reaching the semi-final of the UEFA Cup, the club's best ever result in the competition. On 30 March 2002, he scored his first goal with Milan in a 3–1 home win over Parma, from a free kick.

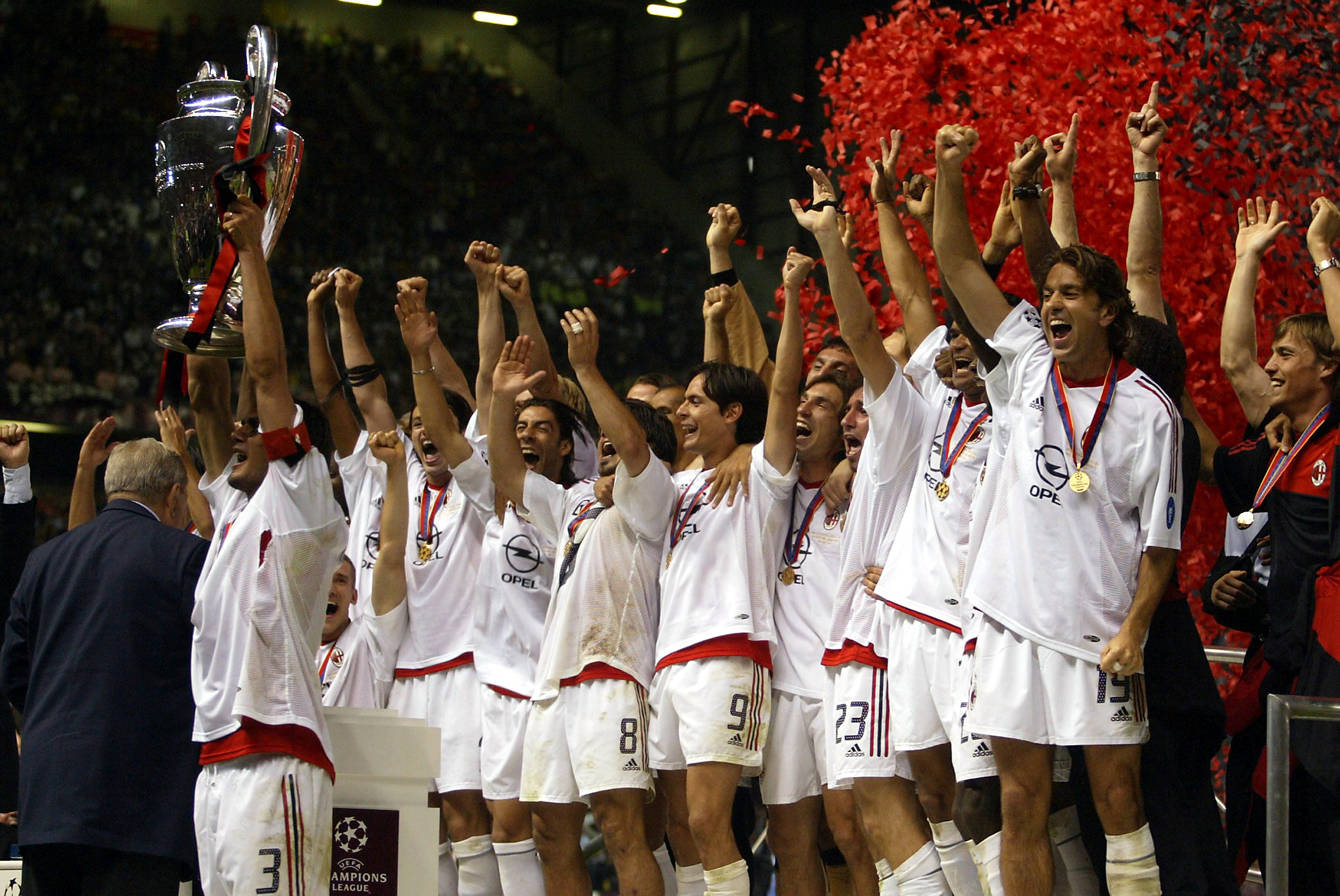
AC Milan celebrating after defeating Juventus 3–2 on penalties to win the 2002–03 UEFA Champions League

Pirlo led Serie A in the 2002–03 season in four categories – passes played (2589), ball possession (123 hours played and 39 minutes), successful balls (661), and successful passes (2093); he averaged almost 90 passes per game throughout the season. During this season, his second with the club, he also managed a career-best of 9 goals in Serie A, as Milan finished the league in third place, also winning the Coppa Italia over Roma, and the UEFA Champions League, beating out Italian rivals and 2003 Serie A champions Juventus in the final 3–2 on penalties, following a 0–0 draw after extra-time. The following season saw Pirlo win the 2003 UEFA Super Cup with Milan over Porto, although the Rossoneri lost to Juventus on penalties in the 2003 Supercoppa Italiana following a 1–1 draw after extra time; during the match, Pirlo scored on a penalty in extra time, and once again in the shoot-out. Milan would also miss out on the 2003 Intercontinental Cup, losing out on penalties once again, to Boca Juniors, following a 1–1 draw after extra-time; on this occasion, Pirlo missed his penalty in the shoot-out, after previously setting up Milan's opening goal of the match. Pirlo would celebrate winning his first Serie A title with Milan during the 2003–04 season however, following up the scudetto with the 2004 Supercoppa Italiana over Lazio.

==== 2004–2006: Struggles ====
Milan finished as runners-up in Serie A to Juventus in the 2004–05 season. In the 2004–05 UEFA Champions League, Pirlo finished as one of the second-highest assist providers with four assists, as he helped Milan to reach the final. In the 2005 UEFA Champions League final against Liverpool, on 25 May, Pirlo assisted Paolo Maldini's opening goal, after 50 seconds, from a free kick, and combined with Kaká before the Brazilian unleashed Hernán Crespo with a long pass for Milan's third goal before halftime. In the second half, however, Liverpool made a three-goal comeback, sending the match into extra time. After a 3–3 deadlock, the match went to penalties, and Milan were defeated by the English team in the shoot-out. Despite Pirlo's performance throughout the competition and in the final, Pirlo had missed his penalty kick during the shoot-out in the final when it was saved by Jerzy Dudek. Pirlo would later state in his autobiography that the 2005 UEFA Champions League final defeat on penalties was the worst moment of his career, and that he had considered retiring prematurely following the match.

The following season, Milan once again finished in second place behind Juventus in Serie A (before their 30-point deduction due to their involvement in the 2006 Calciopoli scandal), also reaching the semi-finals of the UEFA Champions League, only to be defeated by eventual champions, Barcelona, and the quarter-finals of the Coppa Italia. In 2006, Pirlo placed 9th in the Ballon d'Or, which was won by his Italy teammate Fabio Cannavaro, and was elected to the 2006 FIFPro World XI.

==== 2006–2009: Second UEFA Champions League title ====
Andrea has demonstrated all his great talent and worth. When we played together, everything started with him. He always had the great gift of being able to visualise and anticipate plays before everyone else. His vision, what he can do with the ball, and what he's able to create, make him a true superstar. Andrea has something which you don't see very often.

— Roberto Baggio on Pirlo in 2007.

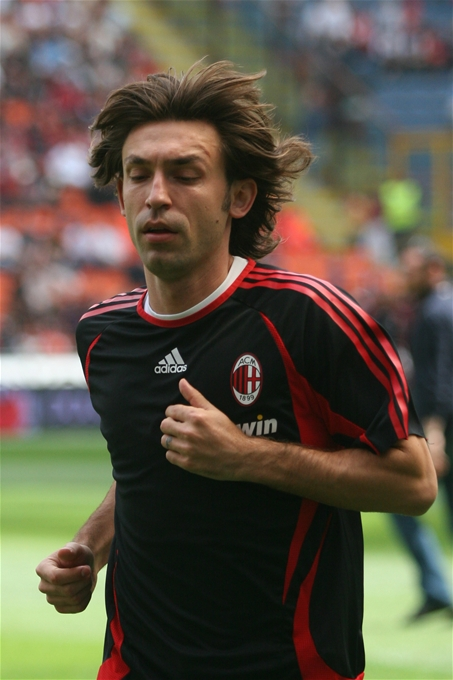
Pirlo playing for AC Milan in 2007

Pirlo led Milan in minutes played for the 2006–07 season with 2,782 across 52 appearances, as he went on to win his second UEFA Champions League title with Milan, also helping his team to a fourth-place finish in Serie A, and another Coppa Italia semi-final. In the second leg of the UEFA Champions League semi-final against Manchester United, Pirlo set up Seedorf's goal, as Milan progressed on to the final. In the 2007 UEFA Champions League final in Athens, Pirlo assisted Inzaghi's first goal from a free kick, helping Milan to defeat Liverpool 2–1, avenging their 2005 final defeat in Istanbul. During the 2007–08 season, Pirlo won his second UEFA Super Cup with Milan, assisting Milan's second goal in the final, and winning the Man of the Match award; he also contributed to the club's first ever FIFA Club World Cup title in 2007, once again setting-up Milan's second goal in the final. In October 2007, he was nominated for the 2007 Ballon d'Or, the 2007 FIFA World Player of the Year, and the 2007 International Federation of Football History & Statistics (IFFHS) World's Best Playmaker Awards, but they were all won by Milan teammate Kaká, as Pirlo placed 5th in the Ballon d'or, 7th in the FIFA World Player of the Year, and 2nd in the World's Best Playmaker Awards. Despite a strong start, Milan suffered a dip in form during the second half of the season, finishing the league in fifth place, failing to qualify for the UEFA Champions League; Milan also suffered eliminations in the round of 16 of the UEFA Champions League and the Coppa Italia that season. The following season, Milan managed a second-place finish in Serie A, alongside Juventus, and behind local rivals Inter, while they were eliminated in the round of 32 of the UEFA Cup, and the round of 16 of the Coppa Italia.

==== 2009–2011: Second Scudetto and farewell ====
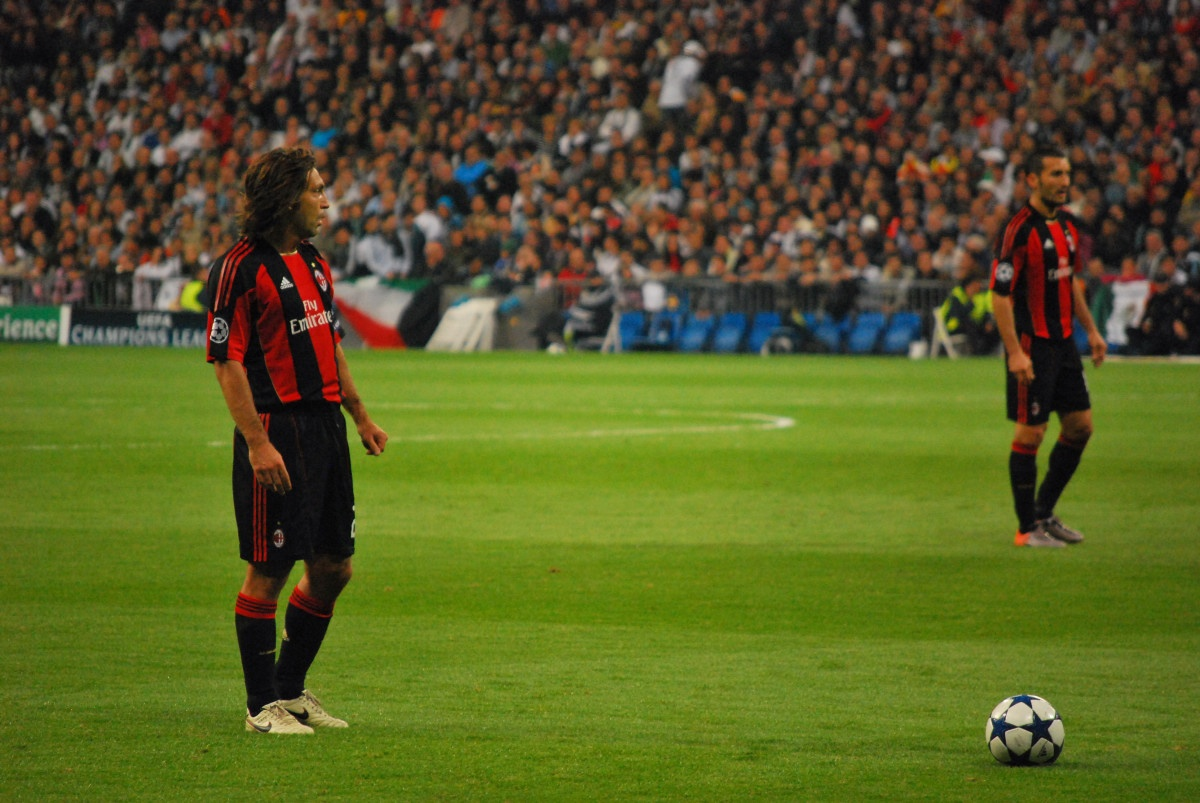
Pirlo (left), with AC Milan, preparing to take a free kick against Real Madrid in the 2010–11 UEFA Champions League

After Kaká and Ancelotti left Milan in the summer of 2009, Chelsea tested Milan's resolve by bidding $12 million and Claudio Pizarro for Pirlo. The club rejected the offer and Pirlo was said to be contemplating a transfer request. On 5 August, club owner Silvio Berlusconi decided not to sell Pirlo, who said he was overjoyed and wanted to end his career at Milan. On 21 October 2009, Pirlo scored a notable 30-metre goal in Milan's 3–2 win over Real Madrid in the UEFA Champions League; Milan were eventually eliminated in the round of 16. Milan finished the season with a 3rd place in Serie A, and a quarter-final finish in the Coppa Italia under new manager Leonardo.

The following season saw Milan dominate the league. Milan played host to Genoa on 25 September 2010, with Pirlo providing a lifted ball over the top of the defence to set striker Zlatan Ibrahimović free to score the solitary goal of the game. On 2 October, Pirlo scored a 40-yard goal against Parma to give Milan their first away win of the 2010–11 season. On 14 May 2011, Pirlo appeared in his last match for Milan, coming on as a half-time substitute for Ambrosini as the club celebrated their Serie A title with a 4–1 victory over Cagliari. Four days later, Pirlo confirmed that he would be leaving Milan at the end of the 2010–11 season, after a mutual decision not to renew his contract. In his last season in Milan, Pirlo appeared in the league just 17 times under manager Massimiliano Allegri, registering one goal and three assists. He won his second Serie A title with Milan that season, and also reached the round of 16 in the UEFA Champions League as well as the semi-final stage in the Coppa Italia.

In total with Milan, Pirlo made 401 appearances, scoring 41 goals. With the club, he won two Serie A titles in 2004 and 2011, as well as two UEFA Champions League titles in 2003 and 2007, also reaching the final in 2005; he also won a Coppa Italia in 2003, a Supercoppa Italiana in 2004, and two UEFA Super Cups in 2003 and 2007, as well as playing a key role in Milan's first ever FIFA Club World Cup title in 2007. During this period, Milan also finished as runners up in Serie A in the 2004–05 and the 2005–06 seasons, as well as finishing second on penalties in the 2003 Supercoppa Italiana, and in the 2003 Intercontinental Cup.

=== Juventus ===
When Andrea told me that he was joining us, the first thing I thought was: "God exists". A player of his level and ability, not to mention that he was free, I think it was the signing of the century!

— Gianluigi Buffon on Pirlo's transfer to Juventus in 2011.

==== 2011–2012: Debut season ====
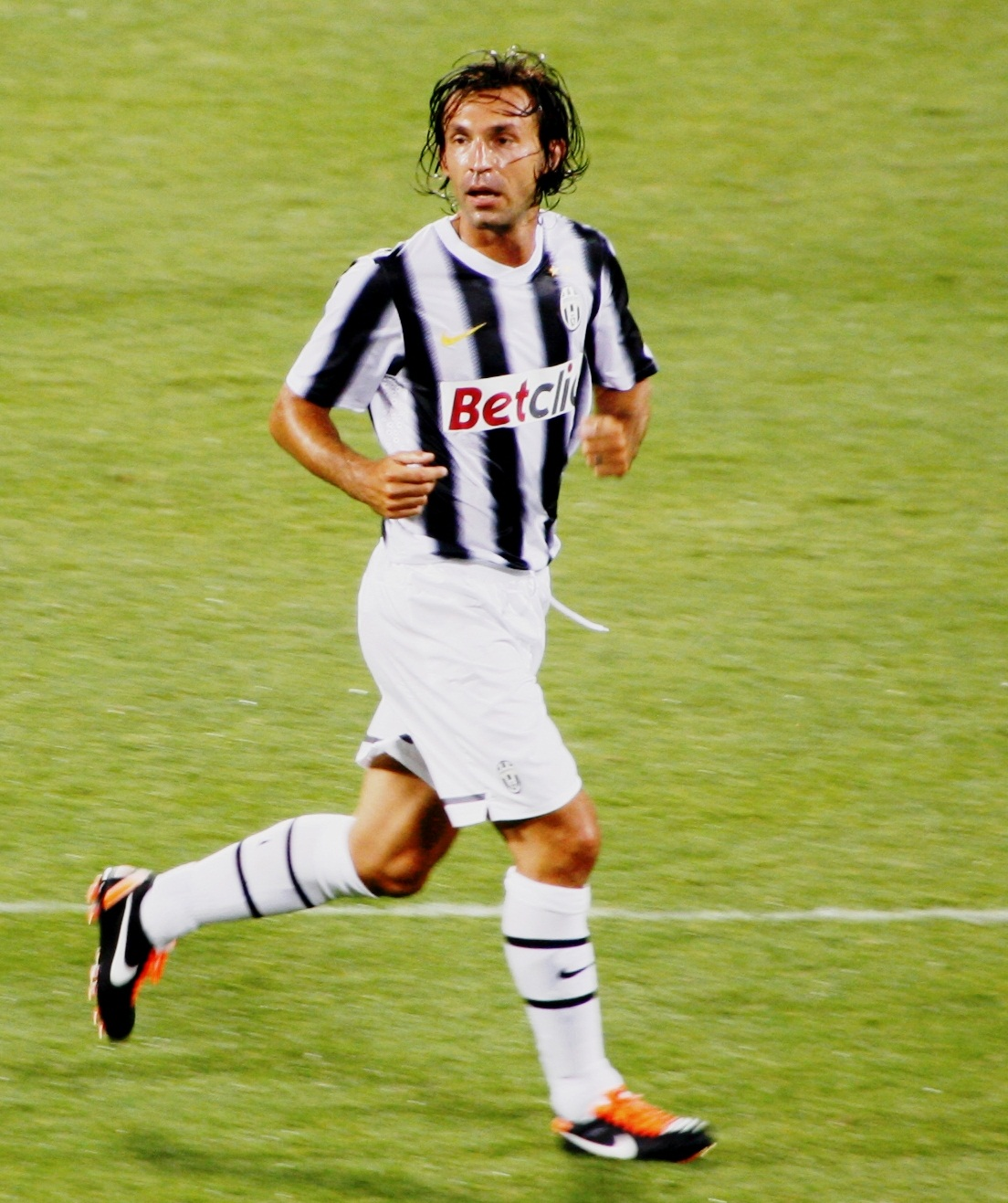
Pirlo with Juventus in 2011. He went on to appear in 41 matches in his first season with the Bianconeri.

Following Pirlo's departure from Milan in 2011, Juventus signed him on a free transfer on a contract until 2014. His debut with Juventus was in a friendly match against Sporting CP, which they lost 2–1. His first competitive match with Juventus was the 2011–12 Serie A opening match against Parma at home, in which he tallied two assists, for Stephan Lichtsteiner and Claudio Marchisio – the former of which was the first ever goal in the Juventus Stadium –, and completed 110 passes in a 4–1 victory. Antonio Conte played him alongside younger midfielders Marchisio and new signing Arturo Vidal in a three-man midfield, which allowed Pirlo to function creatively as a deep-lying playmaker, while Marchisio and Vidal supported him defensively. Pirlo's first goal for Juventus was a free kick against Catania on 18 February 2012 securing a 3–1 victory for Juventus and put the club back at the top of the Serie A table, above his former club Milan. On 18 March, Pirlo scored in a 5–0 demolition of Fiorentina and after the game dedicated the win to Fabrice Muamba, who suffered a cardiac arrest playing for Bolton Wanderers during a match against Tottenham Hotspur the same day.

Pirlo finished the season by winning the 2011–12 Serie A title, after helping Juventus to secure a 2–0 victory over Cagliari. He provided the most assists in the Serie A that season, with 13, and he also found the back of the net three times in the league. Pirlo created over 100 chances and completed 2643 passes that season, with an 87% pass completion rate, completing 500 more passes than any other player in Serie A; the only player in the world to have completed more passes than him that season was Xavi. Due to his performances throughout the season, and his key role in leading Juventus to their first Serie A title in nine years, he was named in the Serie A Team of the Year, along with his Juventus midfielder partner Vidal. Pirlo and Juventus also finished runners up to Napoli in the Coppa Italia final that season. Pirlo's fine form in the 2011–12 season, in which he led Juventus to the league title, the Supercoppa Italiana and Coppa Italia final, as well as leading Italy to the final of Euro 2012, saw him nominated for the 2012 UEFA Best Player in Europe Award, in which he finished 4th. He was also elected to be part of the 2012 ESM Team of the Year and the 2012 UEFA Team of the Year.

==== 2012–2014: Consistent domestic success ====
Pirlo played in the 2012 Supercoppa Italiana in Beijing on 11 August 2012 against Napoli, helping Juventus to a 4–2 win in extra time. He curled in a free kick to seal a 2–0 defeat of Parma on the opening day of the new Serie A season. The goal caused much controversy, as the Parma players protested that it had not gone over the line, and replays proved inconclusive. In the following league match against Udinese on 2 September, Pirlo helped to win a penalty and assisted Sebastian Giovinco's second goal of the match, as Juventus went on to defeat the home team 4–1. On 29 September, Pirlo opened the scoring when he dispatched a trade mark free kick to send Juventus on their way to a 4–1 defeat of Roma. Pirlo was nominated for the 2012 FIFA Ballon d'Or, along with Juventus and Italy teammate Gianluigi Buffon, following their performances throughout the calendar year. Pirlo provided three assists for Juventus during the group stage, helping them to top their group undefeated and advance to the knockout stages for first time since the 2008–09 tournament. Pirlo was also elected the 2012 Serie A Footballer of the Year, as well as the best midfielder of the season, also winning the 2012 Guerin d'Oro. He was named as part of the 2012 Serie A team of the Year for his performances. Pirlo also won the Pallone Azzurro, given to the best player of the year in the Italy national team, as well as placing fourth in the IFFHS World's Best Playmaker of the Year Award, and seventh in the FIFA Ballon d'Or. Pirlo and Juventus retained their Serie A title that season. Juventus were, however, eliminated by Bayern Munich in the quarter finals of the UEFA Champions League, and in the semi-finals of the Coppa Italia by Lazio; both of these teams were the winners of these respective competitions.

Pirlo featured in Juventus's 4–0 win against Lazio in the 2013 Supercoppa Italiana on 18 August 2013 at the Stadio Olimpico in Rome. Pirlo helped to create Paul Pogba's opening goal in the twenty-third minute of play. Pirlo was the only Italian player to be nominated for the 2013 FIFA Ballon d'Or, and was also nominated for the 2013 FIFPro World XI. On 1 December, Pirlo sustained a knee ligament injury which would keep him off the field for over a month. On 12 January 2014, Pirlo signed a new contract with Juventus, which will keep him at the club until 2016. On 27 January, Pirlo was named Serie A Footballer of the Year for a second consecutive time, and was once again included in the Serie A Team of the Year. Juventus won their 30th league title that season with a record 102 points and 33 victories; this was also their third consecutive title since Pirlo's arrival. Juventus also reached the quarter-finals of the Coppa Italia, losing out to Roma. The Turin club suffered a group stage elimination in the UEFA Champions League but managed a semi-final finish in the UEFA Europa League, losing out to Benfica, with Pirlo scoring a match-winning goal from a free kick in the round of 16 against Fiorentina. Pirlo was chosen to be part of the 2013–14 Europa League Team of the Season, for his performances in the competition.

==== 2014–2015: UEFA Champions League final and departure ====
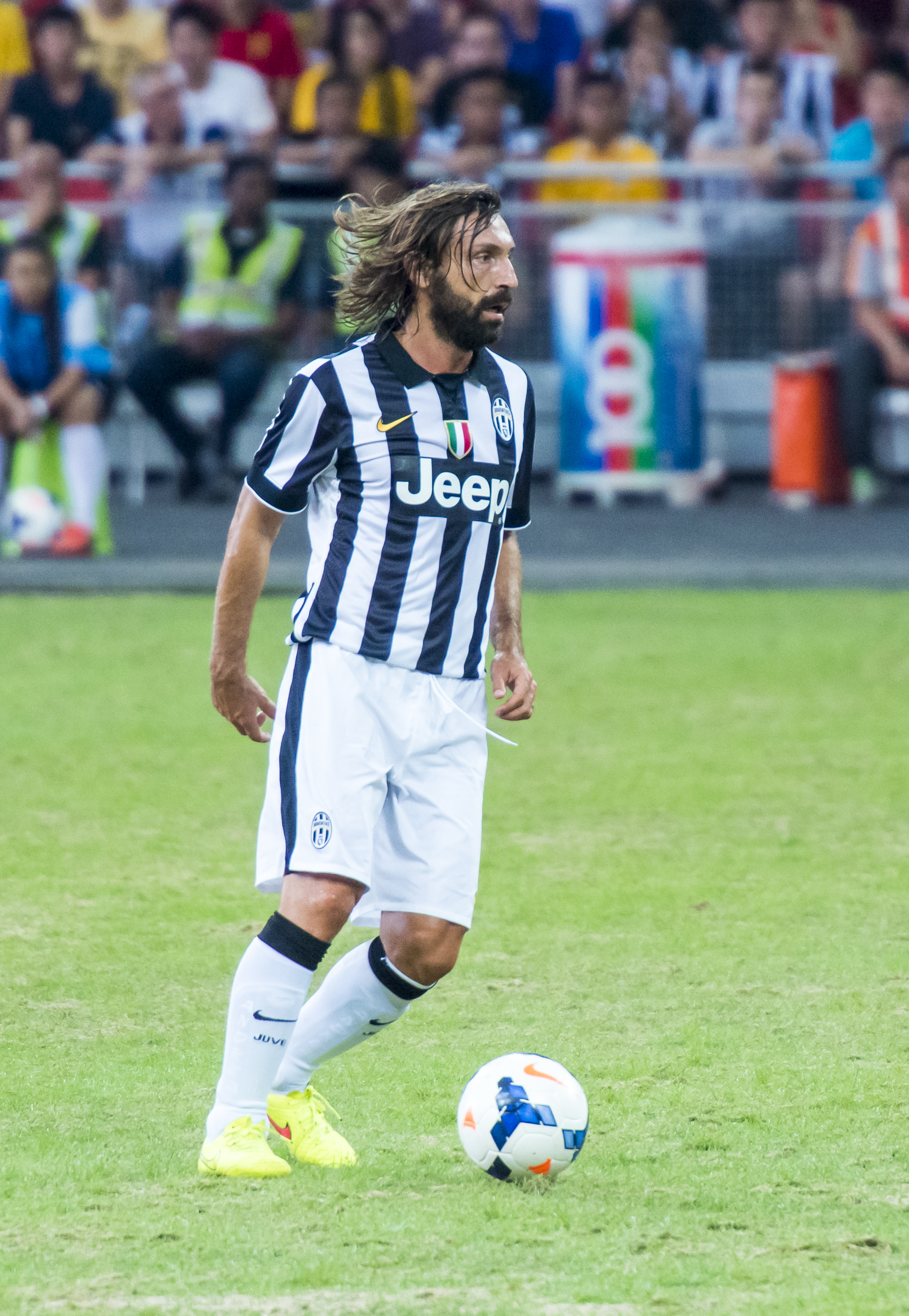
Pirlo playing for Juventus in 2014

On 11 June 2014, Pirlo signed a new contract keeping him at Juventus until 2016. Pirlo made his 100th league appearance for Juventus in a 3–2 home win over Roma on 5 October 2014. On 1 November, Pirlo scored Juventus's opening goal from a free kick in a 2–0 win over Empoli, on their 117th anniversary; this was his 26th goal from a free kick in Serie A, putting him two goals behind the all-time record holder, Siniša Mihajlović. On 4 November, Pirlo scored once again from a trademark, curling direct free kick in a 3–2 home win over Olympiacos in a group-stage UEFA Champions League fixture. This was Pirlo's 100th appearance in the UEFA Champions League, marking the occasion with his first UEFA Champions League goal with Juventus. On 15 December 2014, Pirlo was named the Serie A Footballer of the Year for the third time in his career, and for the third consecutive year since his arrival at Juventus; he was also named part of the 2014 Serie A Team of the Year. In Juventus's 2–1 home victory over Borussia Dortmund in the round of 16 of the UEFA Champions League, on 24 February 2015, Pirlo left the pitch during the first half of the match, after injuring his right calf, ruling him out for three weeks. Pirlo was called up on 11 April 2015 against Parma following his injury. He returned to the starting line-up on 14 April 2015, helping Álvaro Morata to win a penalty which was later converted by Vidal in a 1–0 victory over Monaco at the Juventus Stadium, in the first leg of the UEFA Champions League quarter-finals; he was replaced by Andrea Barzagli during the second half. On 26 April, Pirlo scored from a free kick in a 2–1 away defeat to local rivals Torino in the "Derby di Torino"; this was his 28th goal in Serie A from a free kick, which put him level with Mihajlović as the player with the most goals from free kicks in Serie A history. On 20 May, Pirlo played a part in both of Juventus's goals as the Turin club defeated Lazio 2–1 at the Stadio Olimpico in the 2015 Coppa Italia final. On 6 June 2015, Pirlo played the entirety of the 2015 UEFA Champions League final as Juventus were defeated 3–1 by Barcelona at Berlin's Olympiastadion; this was the final game of his Juventus career. Pirlo was named in the 2014–15 UEFA Champions League Squad of the season for his performances.

In total, he made 164 appearances for Juventus in all competitions, scoring 19 goals (15 of which were scored from free kicks), also providing 39 assists; 31 of his goals came in Serie A, from 119 appearances. During his four seasons in Turin, he won four Serie A titles, a Coppa Italia, and two Supercoppe Italiane, also reaching the fourth UEFA Champions League final of his career during his final season with the club. Over 20 seasons in Italy, he made 493 appearances in Serie A. With 101 assists in the Italian top flight, he is also the fifth–highest assist provider in Serie A history, behind Francesco Totti, Roberto Baggio, Alessandro Del Piero, and Gianni Rivera.

=== New York City FC ===
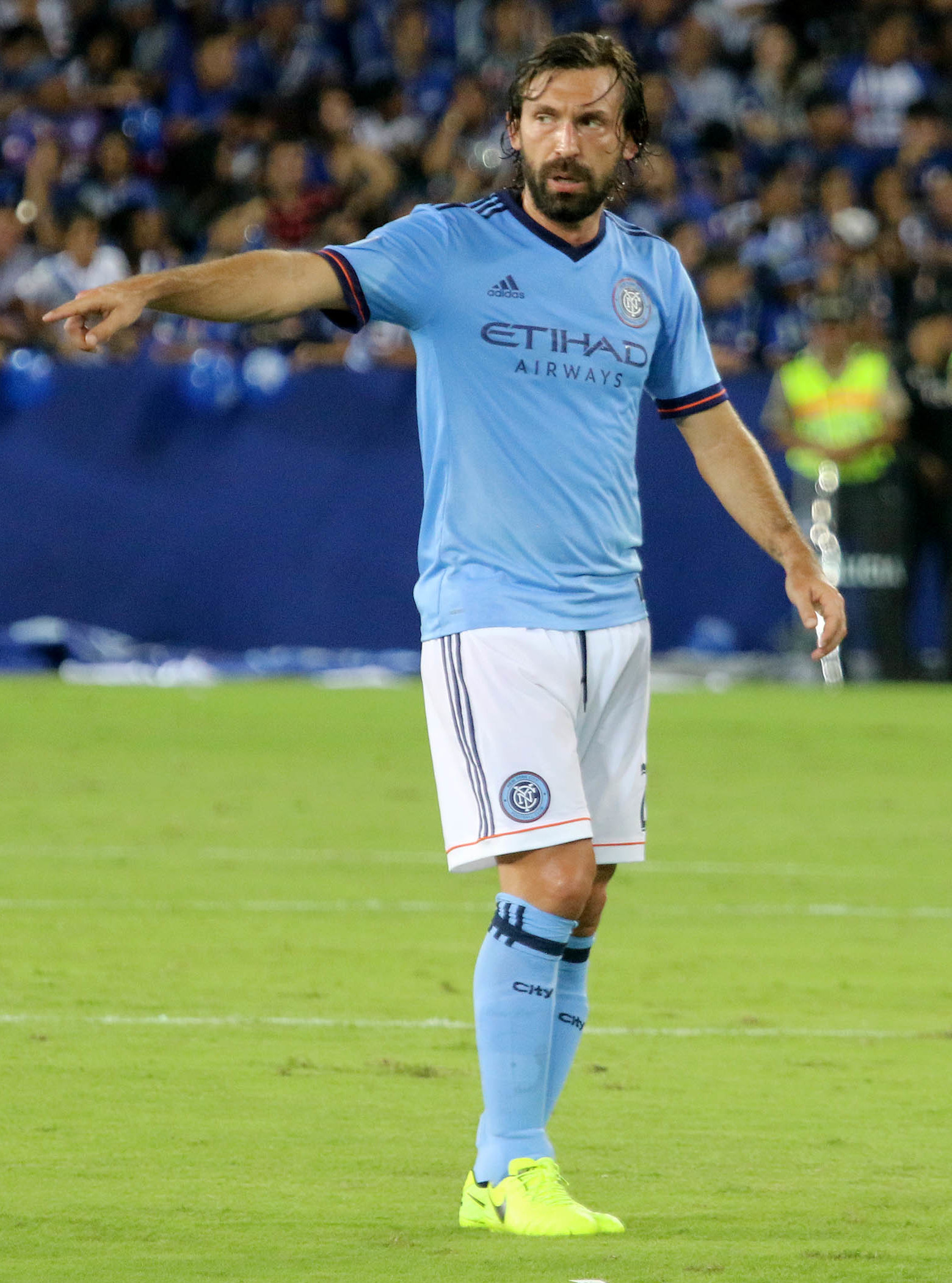
Pirlo with New York City FC in 2017

==== 2015: Playoff disappointment ====
On 6 July 2015, it was announced that Pirlo had completed a move to Major League Soccer (MLS) expansion franchise New York City FC as their third Designated Player. In doing so, he became the highest paid Italian player in all leagues with an $8 million salary, until Graziano Pellè overtook him after moving to Chinese club Shandong Luneng the following year. Pirlo made his debut with the club on 26 July 2015 at Yankee Stadium in New York against Orlando City, coming on as a substitute in the 56th minute; he was involved in his team's third and fourth goals and was booked in the 88th minute as New York won the match 5–3. He made his first start for New York on 1 August, in a 3–2 home defeat to the Montreal Impact. On 12 August, it was announced that Pirlo had placed seventh in the 2015 UEFA Best Player in Europe. On 13 August he set up a goal for David Villa in a 3–1 home win over D.C. United. In October 2015, Pirlo was shortlisted for the 2015 FIFA Ballon d'Or. He finished the 2015 MLS season with 5 assists in 13 appearances, and ended up third in the MLS in minutes per pass, although he failed to score a goal. Despite the presence of Pirlo and two other UEFA Champions League winners, David Villa and Frank Lampard, New York City failed to qualify for the 2015 MLS Cup Playoffs at the conclusion of their debut season, which drew criticism from the press; Pirlo in particular drew criticism from the media for his low defensive work-rate. In November, Pirlo became the first MLS player in history to be nominated for the FIFPro World XI.

==== 2016: All-Star designation ====
Pirlo made his first assist of the 2016 MLS season on 30 April, as he set up a goal for David Villa from a corner in a 3–2 home win over the Vancouver Whitecaps. On 18 June, he scored his first MLS goal from a free kick in the 50th minute of a 3–2 home victory over Philadelphia. In July 2016, Pirlo was included in the roster for the 2016 MLS All-Star Game. Pirlo finished his second MLS season with the club with one goal and a team seasonal best of eleven assists in 32 appearances, as New York City finished in second place in the Eastern Conference, and qualified for the MLS Cup Playoffs for the first time ever, clinching a spot in the Eastern Conference semi-final. He was ruled out of the first leg, however, after sustaining a last-minute calf injury, and New York lost the match 2–0 away to Toronto. He appeared in the second leg on 6 November, as New York were eliminated from the Playoffs 7–0 on aggregate, following a 5–0 home defeat to Toronto.

==== 2017: Retirement ====
After struggling with persisting physical problems for most of the 2017 MLS season, on 8 October 2017, Pirlo announced that he would retire from professional football at the end of the season; in total, he was limited to only 15 appearances and two assists during the 2017 MLS regular season. He made his final professional appearance on 5 November, coming on as a 90th-minute substitute in a 2–0 home win over Columbus Crew, in the second leg of the 2017 MLS Cup Eastern Conference Semi-finals; New York were eliminated from the Playoffs following a 4–3 aggregate loss. In total, Pirlo made 62 appearances for New York – 60 of which came in the MLS regular season, with the other two coming in the MLS Cup Playoffs – over the course of his three seasons with the club, scoring one goal and providing 18 assists, all of which came during the MLS regular season. Pirlo officially communicated his retirement from professional football the following day, on Twitter. A testimonial match – La Notte del Maestro – was played at the San Siro Stadium in Milan on 21 May 2018, in honour of Pirlo's retirement from professional football.

== International career ==
Pirlo is a silent leader. He speaks with his feet.

— Marcello Lippi

To pass the ball to Andrea Pirlo is like to hide it in a safe.

— Zbigniew Boniek

Is he the best player of his generation? Not quite, but he is the most important.

— Michael Cox

=== Under-21 and Olympic career, senior team debut, and Euro 2004 ===
Pirlo captained Italy to an Under-21 European Championship in 2000, wearing the number 10 jersey, and winning the awards for best player and top scorer of the tournament with three goals; he scored both goals – one from a penalty and the other from a free kick – in Italy's 2–1 victory over Czech Republic in the final. He also led the Italy under-21 team to a semi-final finish in the 2002 edition of the tournament. Pirlo played for Italy at the 2000 Summer Olympics in Sydney, scoring a goal in Italy's 1–0 opening win over hosts Australia on 13 September; he also helped Italy win the bronze medal as overage players at the 2004 Summer Olympics in Athens. With 46 matches and 16 goals, Pirlo is the record appearance holder for the Italian under-21 team, and the second highest goal-scorer after Alberto Gilardino.

Under Giovanni Trapattoni Pirlo debuted for the Italian senior squad at the age of 23 in a 2–0 away victory against Azerbaijan in a Euro 2004 qualifying match; he also appeared in a friendly match in Pescara against Turkey on 20 November, later that year, which ended in a 1–1 draw. Pirlo scored his first goal for Italy from a free kick in a 4–0 away win in a friendly match against Tunisia. His first major tournament with the Italian senior team was UEFA Euro 2004 under Trapattoni, where he made two appearances in Italy's last two group matches: the first in a 1–1 draw against Sweden, and the second in a 2–1 win over Bulgaria. The Italian team was eliminated in the first round, on direct encounters, following a three-way five-point tie with Sweden and Denmark.

=== 2006 World Cup ===
Under Trapattoni's replacement, Marcello Lippi, Pirlo became a key member of Italy's starting line-up during their 2006 World Cup Qualifying campaign, and he was eventually called up as a starting member of the Italian squad for the 2006 FIFA World Cup. On 26 March 2005, he assured Italy's participation in the tournament after scoring from two free kicks in a 2–0 win against Scotland in a World Cup Qualifier.

Pirlo was included in Italy's 23-man squad for the 2006 World Cup, and appeared in all of Italy's matches at the tournament, playing 668 minutes in total. In Italy's first match of the tournament on 12 June, Pirlo scored the opening goal against Ghana, and subsequently helped set up a goal for Vincenzo Iaquinta to seal a 2–0 victory, as the midfielder was named Man of the Match. In the second match on 17 June, he set up a diving header for Gilardino from a set piece which proved to be vital in the 1–1 draw against the United States.

In the semi-final against Germany on 4 July, he assisted Fabio Grosso's opening goal in the dying minutes of extra-time and was again named Man of the Match, as Italy triumphed 2–0 over the hosts. In the final against France on 9 July, his corner kick produced Marco Materazzi's equalising header ten minutes after France had opened the scoring with a Zinedine Zidane penalty. Following a 1–1 deadlock after extra-time, the match went to a penalty shoot-out, in which he scored the first spot kick, helping Italy to win the title. Pirlo formed a formidable midfield partnership with Milan teammate Gattuso, and he completed 475 passes out of 580 attempted throughout the tournament, while also winning 18 challenges. After the final, he was named Man of the Match for a third time, winning more Man of the Match Awards than any other player in the tournament. Pirlo was voted the third-best player of the tournament, winning the Bronze Ball. He was named as part of the 2006 FIFPro XI and as part of the 2006 World Cup Team of the Tournament for his performances, placing ninth in both the 2006 Ballon d'Or and the 2006 FIFA World Player of the Year Awards.

"I don't feel pressure ... I don't give a toss about it. I spent the afternoon of Sunday, 9 July 2006 in Berlin sleeping and playing the PlayStation. In the evening, I went out and won the World Cup."

— Pirlo, on his mental state in Italy's World Cup victory over France in the 2006 FIFA World Cup, in Berlin.

=== Post World Cup ===
Pirlo appeared in all three of Italy's group matches at UEFA Euro 2008. He was named Man of the Match in Italy's second group match, a 1–1 draw against Romania, on 13 June. On 17 June 2008, Pirlo netted a penalty as Italy defeated France 2–0 in the final group match, to send their rivals and World Cup runners-up crashing out of the European Championships in the first round. Italy lost on penalty kicks to eventual winners Spain in the quarterfinals, as Pirlo and Milan teammate Gattuso were suspended for the match.

On 15 June 2009, Pirlo assisted Giuseppe Rossi's second goal in a 3–1 win in Italy's opening match of the Confederations Cup against the United States. Italy subsequently lost the following two group matches against Egypt and Brazil, and were eliminated from the competition in the first round.

Pirlo was not able to play the first two games in the 2010 World Cup for Italy due to recent injuries. He came off the bench for Italy late in the match on 24 June against Slovakia. Even with his help in orchestrating a renewed Italian offence, Pirlo could not prevent Italy from being knocked out of the first round.

=== Euro 2012 ===
Coach Prandelli named Pirlo Vice-Captain of the Italian squad, behind captain, Gianluigi Buffon. Pirlo appeared in nine matches as Italy qualified undefeated for the European Championships in Poland and Ukraine, providing several assists, and netting one goal in Italy's 5–0 victory over the Faroe Islands on 7 September 2010.

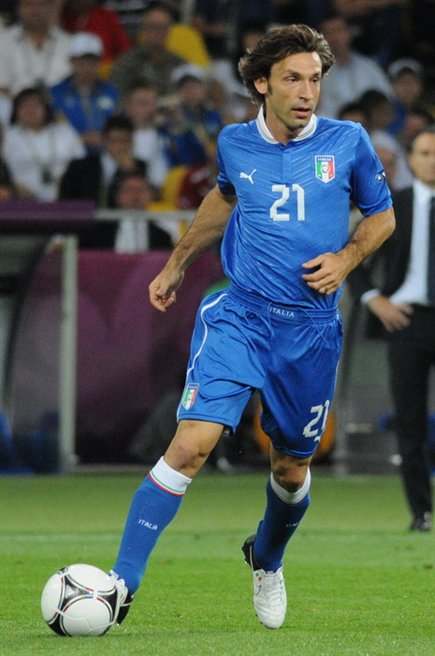
Pirlo playing for Italy against England in quarter final of Euro 2012

Because of his excellent performances in leading Juventus to win the Serie A title, Italy coach Cesare Prandelli included the playmaker in his 32-man provisional squad for Euro 2012, and subsequently in Italy's final 23-man squad for the tournament. Pirlo provided the cutting ball from which Antonio Di Natale scored the opening goal of Italy's 1–1 draw with World and European champions Spain in the opening round of group play on 10 June 2012. Pirlo then opened the scoring himself from a direct free kick in Italy's second group match against Croatia on 14 June, which also ended in a 1–1 draw; Pirlo was named Man of the Match. In the final group match against Republic of Ireland, Pirlo set up Antonio Cassano's goal from a corner kick to help Italy take a 1–0 lead. Italy eventually won 2–0 and progressed to the knock-out stage of the tournament as runners-up in Group C.

On 24 June, Pirlo produced a Man of the Match performance in the quarter-finals against England, as Italy won 4–2 on penalties after the game had finished 0–0 in extra time. Pirlo scored in the shoot-out with an audacious chipped penalty down the centre of the goal, also known as a Panenka. Following the match Pirlo spoke of his eloquent penalty, stating, "At the moment I saw the goalkeeper making strange movements, so I waited for him to move and hit it like that... It was easier for me to chip it at that stage. Maybe my effort put some pressure on England." Pirlo completed more passes than the entire England midfield, as he managed 131 passes, the most of any player during the match, and the second most in a single match in the history of the European Championship, behind Xavi, with an 87% pass completion rate, as Italy finished the match with 63% ball possession. He also ran 11.58 kilometres throughout the match, covering more distance than any England player.

In the semi-final round, on 28 June, Pirlo once again put up a Man of the Match performance against Germany, starting the play which led to Balotelli's first goal of the match, as Italy won 2–1 to advance to the final of the tournament. Following Italy's success in the semi-finals, Italy were defeated 4–0 against Spain in the final.

Pirlo won three Man of the Match Awards at Euro 2012, the most awards won by a single player, along with Andrés Iniesta of tournament champions Spain. Pirlo was nominated for the Player of the Tournament Award, which ultimately went to Iniesta, and he was also elected to be part of the Team of the Tournament.

=== 2013 Confederations Cup ===
Pirlo was selected for Italy's squad to play in Brazil at the 2013 Confederations Cup. He won his 100th cap on 16 June in Italy's opening game against Mexico, opening the scoring with a trademark free kick as Italy won 2–1, and Pirlo was voted Man of the Match. He was only the fifth Italian player to receive 100 caps after Dino Zoff, Paolo Maldini, Gianluigi Buffon, and Fabio Cannavaro. In the second group stage match against Japan on 19 June, Pirlo assisted De Rossi's goal against from a corner, as the match ended 4–3 to Italy. The win allowed Italy to progress to the semi-finals of the competition for the first time.

Pirlo did not play in the third group stage match against hosts Brazil, as he had come down with a minor injury at the end of the second match, although he would be available to play for the semi-finals. Italy were defeated 4–2 in the final group stage match on 22 June, which meant that they finished second in group A, and would be playing the winners of group B, tournament favourites Spain, in a rematch of the European Championship final of the previous year. Italy held Spain to 0–0 draw on 27 June, as the match eventually went to penalties. Pirlo netted his penalty, but Bonucci's miss allowed Spain to advance to the final, as Italy lost the shoot-out 7–6. Pirlo was injured for the third place final, although Italy managed to defeat Uruguay 3–2 on penalties on 30 June, after a 2–2 draw. Pirlo was named in the Team of the Tournament, and was nominated for the Golden Ball award, although he failed to place amongst the top three players of the tournament, as the awards went to Neymar, Iniesta, and Paulinho, respectively.

=== 2014 World Cup ===
Pirlo scored one goal during Italy's qualification campaign for the 2014 FIFA World Cup, which saw them top their group, undefeated. Pirlo converted a penalty as Italy dispatched Armenia by a score of 3–1 on 12 October 2012, and assisted several goals during the World Cup qualifying campaign. On 5 June 2014, Pirlo was selected by Italy manager Prandelli as part of his 23-man squad for the 2014 World Cup in Brazil. On 12 June, Pirlo announced that he would retire from international football following the tournament.

In the 2014 World Cup, Italy were placed in Group D, along with Costa Rica, England and Uruguay, in what was called the "Group of Death". On 14 June, in Italy's opening match against England, Pirlo wore the captain's armband due to Buffon's last minute injury. The match ended with a 2–1 win to Italy. Pirlo heavily contributed to Italy's win, controlling the flow of the game, and setting up several goalscoring chances, as Italy dominated possession. During the match, Pirlo made 108 passes in total, only misplacing five, with a pass completion rate of 95.4%, completing the most passes of any other player in the previous opening matches of the 2014 World Cup. With a 93.2 pass percentage, Italy also managed to record the highest pass accuracy percentage of any team in a World Cup match since Denmark in the 1966 World Cup, completing 561 of their 602 passes. Pirlo also contributed to Italy's first goal of the match: Antonio Candreva's short corner was played to Marco Verratti, who then passed the ball out wide towards Pirlo, who drew his marker with him. Pirlo let the ball pass in between his legs to Marchisio, leaving him with space to score with a low drive from outside the area. Pirlo also managed to hit the crossbar from a swerving free kick in injury time. Italy suffered 1–0 defeats in both of their remaining matches against Costa Rica and Uruguay, however and were eliminated in the group stage for the second consecutive World Cup, finishing in a disappointing third place in their group, behind Costa Rica and Uruguay. Pirlo's appearance against Uruguay was his 112th cap for Italy, which allowed him to equal Dino Zoff's number of appearances for the Italy national team, and made him the fourth most capped player for the Italy national team. The Italian squad and manager, Cesare Prandelli, were criticised for over-relying on Pirlo to create goalscoring chances. Although Pirlo was able to set up some goal scoring opportunities and did test the opposition goalkeepers with some dangerous free kicks in the final two group games, his performances were stifled by the defensive pressure of the opposition, and he was much less dominant than he had been in the opening match against England. Although he had previously communicated his intention to retire after the World Cup, he stated, upon his return to Italy, that he would still be available to play for the national team.

=== Euro 2016 absence ===
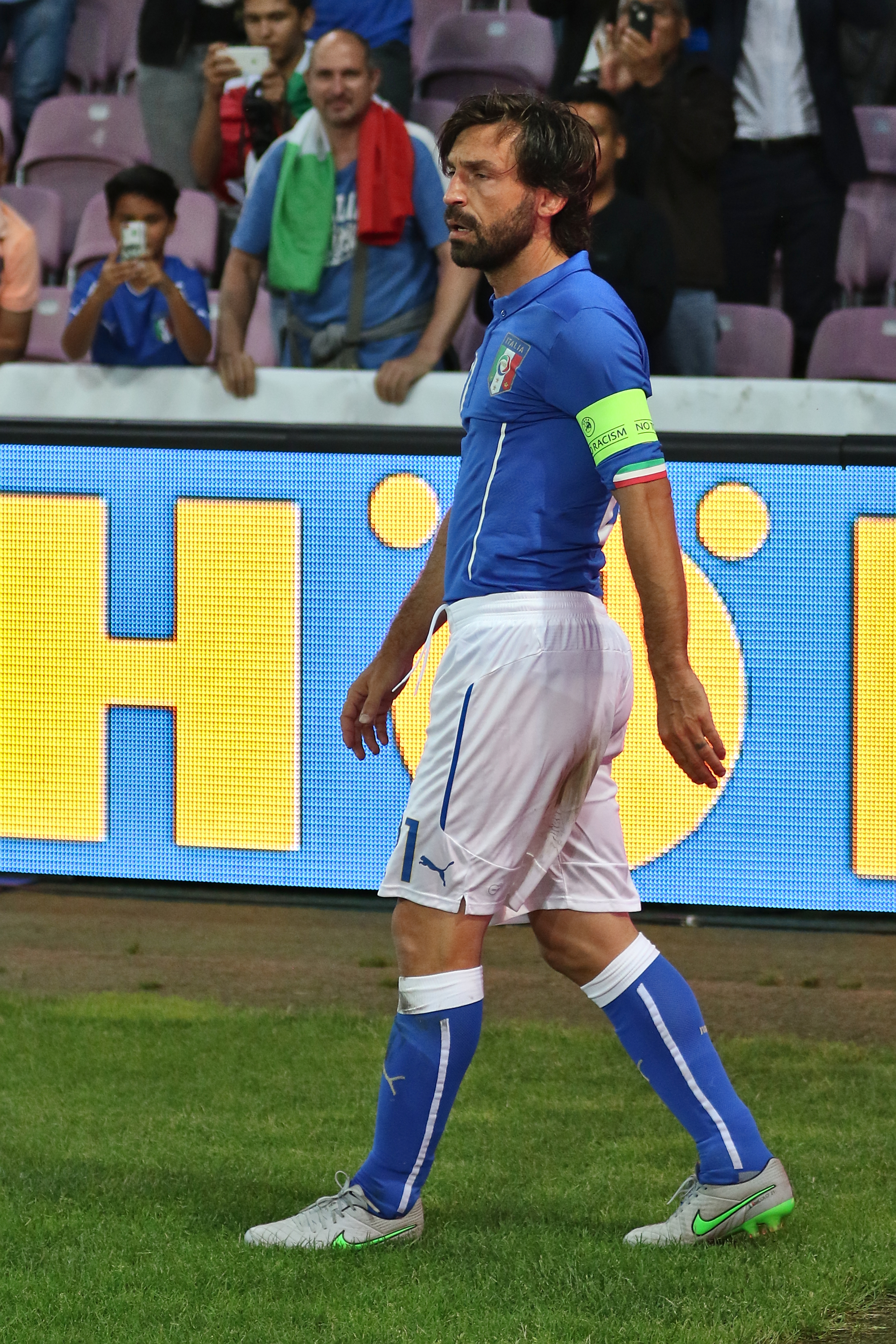
Pirlo captaining Italy in 2015

Despite previously announcing his international retirement following the 2014 World Cup, Pirlo reversed his decision, and under new Italy manager, and Pirlo's former Juventus manager Conte, Pirlo returned to the Italian squad. On 10 October, Pirlo started in Italy's second Euro 2016 qualifying match, which ended in a 2–1 home win over Azerbaijan, overtaking Zoff with his 113th appearance for Italy. Pirlo assisted Chiellini's first goal of the match from a corner kick. In August 2015, Pirlo was called for Italy's Euro 2016 qualifying matches against Malta and Bulgaria in September; he appeared in Italy's 1–0 home victory over Malta on 3 September, becoming the first MLS player to represent Italy; this was his final international appearance. In total, Pirlo made four appearances under Conte, as Italy qualified for Euro 2016 on 10 October in a 3–1 win over Azerbaijan. On 23 May 2016, Pirlo, along with fellow MLS compatriot Giovinco, was left off of Conte's 30-player shortlist for Italy's Euro 2016 squad. Regarding their omission, Conte commented in a press conference: "When you make a certain choice and go to play in certain leagues, you do so taking it into account that they could pay the consequences from a footballing viewpoint". In response to Conte's comments, Pirlo stated to Sky Italia: "I have spoken to Conte and there is no disappointment on my part, he knows what he has to do and what he should not do. We had discussions during the season and both parties made their own decisions. He is the coach and it's only right he makes his decisions and decides what is best for him. I hope Italy win although the favourites are other teams such as Germany, Spain and France."

In total, Pirlo made 116 appearances for Italy, scoring 13 goals, making him the fifth-most capped player in his nation's history.

== Style of play ==
Pirlo is a genius. Together with Baggio, I think he's the greatest talent that Italian football has produced in the last 25 years.

— Gianluigi Buffon, in 2014

Pirlo spots a pass in a split-second that lesser players could spend a whole lifetime waiting to see.

— Carlo Ancelotti

Pirlo can make his feet do whatever he wants. He's a genius.

— Johan Cruyff

=== Position and reception ===
Tactically, Pirlo was capable of playing in several midfield positions, but was usually deployed by his club and national teams as a central midfielder, in the role of a deep-lying playmaker, due to his vision and passing accuracy. A technical and creative player, Pirlo is regarded by players, managers, and pundits as one of the greatest ever players in his position; throughout his career, he was considered one of the greatest midfielders in the world and of his generation, and as one of the greatest Italian players ever, and is regarded as one of the greatest midfielders of all time by several pundits, managers and players. Pirlo started his career in a more advanced role, as an attacking midfielder, and also played as a supporting striker on occasion. Although he was considered a talented young prospect, even drawing comparisons with former Italian footballer Gianni Rivera, Pirlo occasionally struggled in this role, due to his lack of pace, and competition from other talented and more dynamic players in his position.

Because of this, he was later moved to a deep-lying playmaker role by his coaches Mazzone, Terim, and Ancelotti, where he was able to excel due to his unique capabilities. This position best utilised Pirlo's attributes, and allowed him to operate creatively from a deeper position, in or even behind the main midfield line, in a seemingly defensive midfield role, where he was allowed more time on the ball to create scoring opportunities with his trademark long balls. This position has occasionally been described as "the Pirlo role," in the media, due to Pirlo's association with the role and his success in executing and popularising it. During his final season with Milan, Pirlo was also used on the wing under Allegri, due to his ability to provide accurate crosses.

=== Skills ===
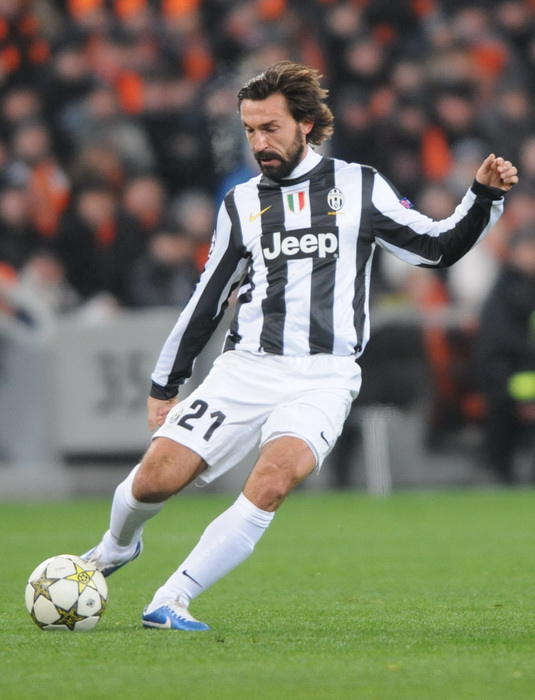
Pirlo playing for Juventus in 2012

Although not gifted with pace, stamina, physicality or notable defensive skills, work-rate, or tackling abilities, (Note: See) Pirlo was known for his composure in possession, and drew praise for his touch, technique, balance, elegance, close control, and dribbling ability, as well as his flair and creativity in beating players with feints during one-on-one situations, in order to retain the ball and create space for himself to play and receive passes. (Note: See) His reactions and ability to anticipate plays also enabled him to cover ground in midfield and intercept passes despite his lack of pace, tackling ability, or stamina. As a playmaker, he is highly regarded by pundits for his outstanding vision, awareness, and football intelligence, as well as his movement, positional sense, inventive play, anticipation, ability to read the game, and his wide range of distribution, which enabled him to play the ball first time and rarely relinquish possession, even when put under pressure; in addition to being capable of playing precise, short exchanges to teammates, he was also known for frequently attempting riskier and more difficult passes and is renowned in particular for his extremely accurate long-range passing, both on the ground or in the air, with either foot, despite being naturally right footed. (Note: See) He is considered to be one of the best passers in the history of the sport, (Note: See) and is also known for his accurate striking ability from distance. These characteristics allowed him to contribute to his team's offensive play with goals and assists.

Pirlo was a free-kick and penalty-kick specialist. Throughout his career, he was regarded as one of the best free-kick takers in the world, and drew praise from pundits for his versatility, and ability to both score and create chances from dead-ball situations. He was extremely effective at curling shots accurately on target from close range, a technique that he perfected by studying Baggio in training sessions during their time at Brescia together; as a youngster, Zico, Michel Platini, and Diego Maradona were also some of his major influences when taking free kicks. Pirlo was also capable of scoring from long-range free kicks with swerve and power, due to his unique technique, which was inspired by Juninho's "knuckle ball" free kicks; this technique was later dubbed the maledetta ("accursed") in the Italian media. Pirlo has scored the highest number of free kicks in Serie A, alongside Siniša Mihajlović.

=== Nicknames ===
Fellow players on the Italy national team nicknamed Pirlo l'architetto ("the Architect"), because of the way that he built plays, and set up goal-scoring opportunities with long, lobbed through passes. (Note: See) In later seasons, Juventus fans also dubbed him il professore ("the professor"), Maestro, and Mozart, as a reference to the Austrian composer's prodigious ability. Pirlo was also frequently compared to fellow former Milan and Italy playmaker Albertini early in his Milan career, due to their similar characteristics and style of play. Pirlo was often thought to be Albertini's heir for Milan and the national team; he inherited his nickname the metronome whilst playing at Milan, for the way in which he influenced games by controlling the tempo of his team's play through his direct, precise, and efficient passing game in midfield, as well as his ability to make himself available to teammates to receive and subsequently distribute the ball. (Note: See)

== Managerial career ==
=== Juventus U23 and Juventus ===
In August 2019, Pirlo enrolled in the UEFA Pro Licence courses at Coverciano. On 30 July 2020, Pirlo was appointed head coach of Serie C club Juventus U23, the reserve side of his former club Juventus. Nine days later, following the dismissal of Maurizio Sarri, Pirlo was appointed head coach of the first team, signing a two-year contract. Pirlo received his UEFA Pro Licence on 16 September 2020. Pirlo received 107 out of 110 after his oral validation of his 30-page thesis, entitled "The football that I would like" (Italian: Il calcio che vorrei). Pirlo cited the teams that "inspired [his] idea of football" as "the Barcelona of Johan Cruyff and then of Pep Guardiola, the Ajax of Louis van Gaal, the Milan of Carlo Ancelotti, and the Juventus of Antonio Conte".

In his first competitive match as a head coach, on 20 September 2020, Juventus won 3–0 at home in a league game against Sampdoria. He made his Champions League debut as a manager on 20 October, leading Juventus to a 2–0 away win over Dynamo Kyiv; as a result, he became only the third Juventus manager after Lippi and Capello to win his first away game in the competition.

On 20 January 2021, Pirlo won his first trophy as manager with Juventus, beating Napoli 2–0 in the 2020 Supercoppa Italiana. On 9 March 2021, Juventus were eliminated from the 2020–21 UEFA Champions League by Porto in the round of 16 on the away goals rule, drawing 4–4 on aggregate. On 2 May 2021, Juventus' run of nine consecutive titles was mathematically ended by Internazionale who were confirmed as champions. On 19 May, Pirlo won the Coppa Italia with Juventus following a 2–1 victory over Atalanta in the final. On 23 May, the final day of the league, Pirlo managed to secure a fourth-place finish for Juventus after a 4–1 away win over Bologna, one point above Napoli which drew 1–1 with Verona, granting Juventus qualification to the following season's Champions League. Five days later, on 28 May, Juventus announced the departure of Pirlo from his managerial position at the club.

=== Fatih Karagümrük ===
In the 2022–23 season, Pirlo led Turkish club Fatih Karagümrük to a seventh-place finish in the Süper Lig. The following year, he managed the recently relegated Sampdoria to seventh place in Serie B, but was sacked after the club won only one point in the first three league games of the 2024–25 season.

=== United ===
Pirlo coached Emirati club United of the UAE First Division League for the 2025–26 season. On 15 May 2026, he achieved promotion to the UAE Pro League after a 0–0 draw against Al Orooba. This was the club's first ever promotion to the Pro League. He eventually finished second in the league that season.

Later in the year, in July, his appointment as Italy's national team coach had been taken for granted by several journalists, including Fabrizio Romano. Nonetheless, controversy broke out owing to a sponsorship with Russian betting company Fonbet, known to have strong links with President Vladimir Putin. Italy's bid for Pirlo was, therefore, withdrawn as FIGC directors Paolo Maldini and Leonardo Araújo resigned from their roles.

== Personal life ==
Pirlo is the second of three children, with an older brother Ivan and a younger sister Silvia. He was married to Deborah Roversi; the couple have two children, born in 2003 and 2006. The couple separated in 2014 after he began an extramarital affair with his now second wife Valentina Baldini.

Pirlo's father founded a metal trading company in Brescia in 1982 called Elg Steel. Pirlo himself retains a stake in the family business. With regard to his wealth from his family business and footballing career, Pirlo stated in an interview with Italian Vanity Fair magazine that he never talks about money. Pirlo is known for being a wine connoisseur and he also runs his own vineyard in Italy, which produces around 15,000–20,000 bottles a year.

In 2013, Pirlo wrote an autobiography, with Alessandro Alciato, titled Penso Quindi Gioco (I Think Therefore I Play). On 1 September 2014, Pirlo, along with many current and former footballing stars, took part in the "Match for Peace", which was played at the Stadio Olimpico, in Rome, with the proceeds being donated entirely to charity. That same year, he revealed that he supported Inter in his youth, and that his favourite footballers and major influences as a player were German former midfielder Lothar Matthäus – as he played for Inter – and compatriot Roberto Baggio – due to his playing style and role on the pitch as an offensive playmaker, with which Pirlo identified at the time.

In July 2016, it was reported that Pirlo's jersey was the highest-selling MLS shirt in 2016.

On 7 July 2017, Valentina Baldini, gave birth to their twin sons named Leonardo and Tommaso. In 2022, Pirlo and Baldini married in Turin.

Pirlo has been featured in EA Sports' FIFA and FC video game series as one of the Ultimate Team icon players.

== Career statistics ==
=== Club ===
Appearances and goals by club, season and competition
Club	Season	League			National cup (Note: Includes Coppa Italia, U.S. Open Cup)		Continental		Other		Total	
Club	Season	Division	Apps	Goals	Apps	Goals	Apps	Goals	Apps	Goals	Apps	Goals
Brescia	1994–95	Serie A	1	0	0	0	—		—		1	0
Brescia	1995–96	Serie B	0	0	0	0	—		—		0	0
Brescia	1996–97	Serie B	17	2	1	0	—		—		18	2
Brescia	1997–98	Serie A	29	4	1	0	—		—		30	4
Brescia	Total		47	6	2	0	—		—		49	6
Inter Milan	1998–99	Serie A	18	0	7	0	7 (Note: Appearances in UEFA Champions League)	0	—		32	0
Inter Milan	2000–01	Serie A	4	0	1	0	3 (Note: Two appearances in UEFA Champions League, one appearance in UEFA Cup)	0	—		8	0
Inter Milan	Total		22	0	8	0	10	0	—		40	0
Reggina (loan)	1999–2000	Serie A	28	6	2	0	—		—		30	6
Brescia (loan)	2000–01	Serie A	10	0	0	0	—		—		10	0
AC Milan	2001–02	Serie A	18	2	2	0	9 (Note: Appearances in UEFA Cup)	0	—		29	2
AC Milan	2002–03	Serie A	27	9	2	0	13	0	—		42	9
AC Milan	2003–04	Serie A	32	6	0	0	9	1	3 (Note: One appearance and one goal in Supercoppa Italiana, one appearance in UEFA Super Cup, one appearance in Intercontinental Cup)	1	44	8
AC Milan	2004–05	Serie A	30	4	1	0	12	1	0	0	43	5
AC Milan	2005–06	Serie A	33	4	4	0	12	1	—		49	5
AC Milan	2006–07	Serie A	34	2	4	0	14	1	—		52	3
AC Milan	2007–08	Serie A	33	3	1	0	8	2	3 (Note: One appearance in UEFA Super Cup, two appearances in FIFA Club World Cup)	0	45	5
AC Milan	2008–09	Serie A	26	1	0	0	3	1	—		29	2
AC Milan	2009–10	Serie A	34	0	1	0	8	1	—		43	1
AC Milan	2010–11	Serie A	17	1	3	0	5	0	—		25	1
AC Milan	Total		284	32	18	0	93	8	6	1	401	41
Juventus	2011–12	Serie A	37	3	4	0	—		—		41	3
Juventus	2012–13	Serie A	32	5	2	0	10	0	1 (Note: Appearance in Supercoppa Italiana)	0	45	5
Juventus	2013–14	Serie A	30	4	1	0	13 (Note: Five appearances in UEFA Champions League, eight appearances and two goals in UEFA Europa League)	2	1	0	45	6
Juventus	2014–15	Serie A	20	4	2	0	10	1	1	0	33	5
Juventus	Total		119	16	9	0	33	3	3	0	164	19
New York City FC	2015	Major League Soccer	13	0	0	0	—		—		13	0
New York City FC	2016	Major League Soccer	32	1	0	0	—		1 (Note: Appearance in MLS Cup Playoffs)	0	33	1
New York City FC	2017	Major League Soccer	15	0	0	0	—		1	0	16	0
New York City FC	Total		60	1	0	0	—		2	0	62	1
Career total			570	61	39	0	136	11	11	1	756	73

=== International ===
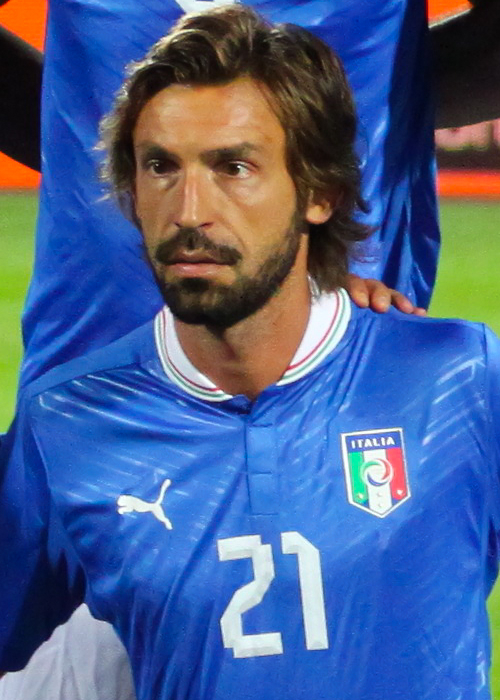
Pirlo with Italy in 2012. He is the fifth most capped player in the history of the Azzurri with 116 appearances between 2002 and 2015.

Appearances and goals by national team and year
National team	Year	Apps	Goals
Italy	2002	4	0
Italy	2003	1	0
Italy	2004	7	1
Italy	2005	9	3
Italy	2006	14	1
Italy	2007	8	1
Italy	2008	9	1
Italy	2009	12	1
Italy	2010	8	1
Italy	2011	9	0
Italy	2012	13	2
Italy	2013	13	2
Italy	2014	6	0
Italy	2015	3	0
Total		116	13

Scores and results list Italy's goal tally first, score column indicates score after each Pirlo goal.

List of international goals scored by Andrea Pirlo
No.	Date	Venue	Opponent	Score	Result	Competition
1.	30 May 2004	Stade Olympique de Radès, Radès, Tunisia	Tunisia	3–0	4–0	Friendly
2.	26 March 2005	San Siro, Milan, Italy	Scotland	1–0	2–0	2006 FIFA World Cup qualification
3.	26 March 2005	San Siro, Milan, Italy	Scotland	2–0	2–0	2006 FIFA World Cup qualification
4.	17 August 2005	Lansdowne Road, Dublin, Ireland	Republic of Ireland	1–0	2–1	Friendly
5.	12 June 2006	AWD-Arena, Hanover, Germany	Ghana	1–0	2–0	2006 FIFA World Cup
6.	13 October 2007	Stadio Luigi Ferraris, Genoa, Italy	Georgia	1–0	2–0	UEFA Euro 2008 qualification
7.	17 June 2008	Letzigrund, Zürich, Switzerland	France	1–0	2–0	UEFA Euro 2008
8.	28 March 2009	Podgorica City Stadium, Podgorica, Montenegro	Montenegro	1–0	2–0	2010 FIFA World Cup qualification
9.	7 September 2010	Stadio Artemio Franchi, Florence, Italy	Faroe Islands	5–0	5–0	UEFA Euro 2012 qualification
10.	14 June 2012	Stadion Miejski, Poznań, Poland	Croatia	1–0	1–1	UEFA Euro 2012
11.	12 October 2012	Hrazdan Stadium, Yerevan, Armenia	Armenia	1–0	3–1	2014 FIFA World Cup qualification
12.	31 May 2013	Stadio Renato Dall'Ara, Bologna, Italy	San Marino	3–0	4–0	Friendly
13.	16 June 2013	Estádio do Maracanã, Rio de Janeiro, Brazil	Mexico	1–0	2–1	2013 FIFA Confederations Cup

=== Managerial ===
As of match played 1 October 2026

Managerial record by club and tenure
Team	Nat	From	To	Record					Ref.
Team	Nat	From	To	M	W	D	L	Win %	Ref.
Juventus U23	(Italy)	30 July 2020	8 August 2020	0	0	0	0	—	
Juventus	(Italy)	8 August 2020	28 May 2021	52	34	10	8	65.38	
Fatih Karagümrük	(Turkey)	12 June 2022	24 May 2023	36	13	12	11	36.11	
Sampdoria	(Italy)	27 June 2023	29 August 2024	45	16	12	17	35.56	
Dubai United	(United Arab Emirates)	25 July 2025	Present	41	24	9	8	58.54	
Total				174	87	43	44	50.00	

== Honours ==
=== Player ===
Brescia

- Serie B: 1996–97

AC Milan

- Serie A: 2003–04, 2010–11
- Coppa Italia: 2002–03
- UEFA Champions League: 2002–03, 2006–07; runner-up: 2004–05
- UEFA Super Cup: 2003, 2007
- FIFA Club World Cup: 2007

Juventus

- Serie A: 2011–12, 2012–13, 2013–14, 2014–15
- Coppa Italia: 2014–15
- Supercoppa Italiana: 2012, 2013
- UEFA Champions League runner-up: 2014–15

Italy U21

- UEFA European Under-21 Championship: 2000

Italy Olympic Team

- Olympic Bronze Medal: 2004

Italy

- FIFA World Cup: 2006
- UEFA European Championship runner-up: 2012
- FIFA Confederations Cup third place: 2013

Individual

- UEFA European Under-21 Championship Golden Player: 2000
- UEFA European Under-21 Championship Golden Boot: 2000
- FIFA World Cup All-Star Team: 2006
- FIFA World Cup Bronze Ball: 2006
- FIFA World Cup top assists provider: 2006
- 2006 FIFA World Cup final: Man of the Match
- FIFPro World XI: 2006
- UEFA Super Cup Man of the Match: 2007
- ESPN World Team of the Decade: 2009
- Premio Bulgarelli Number 8: 2012
- ESM Team of the Year: 2011–12
- Pallone d'Argento: 2011–12
- Pallone Azzurro: 2012
- Guerin d'Oro: 2012
- UEFA European Championship Teams of the Tournament: 2012
- UEFA Team of the Year: 2012
- Serie A top assists provider: 2011–12
- Serie A Team of the Year: 2011–12, 2012–13, 2013–14, 2014–15
- Serie A Midfielder of the Year: 2012
- Serie A Footballer of the Year: 2012, 2013, 2014
- Premio Nazionale Carriera Esemplare "Gaetano Scirea": 2013
- FIFA Confederations Cup Team of the Tournament: 2013
- FIFA Confederations Cup Castrol Index Top XI: 2013
- UEFA Europa League Team of the Season: 2013–14
- UEFA Champions League Team of the Season: 2014–15
- AC Milan Hall of Fame
- UEFA European Under-21 Championship All-time XI: 2015
- New York City FC's Ride of Fame: September 2015
- Globe Soccer Awards Player Career Award: 2015
- UEFA European Championship All-time XI: 2016
- Major League Soccer All-Star: 2016
- Juventus Greatest XI of All Time: 2017
- Premio internazionale Giacinto Facchetti: 2017
- AIC Lifetime Achievement Award: 2018
- Golden Foot Award Legends: 2018
- Italian Football Hall of Fame: 2019
- Ballon d'Or Dream Team (Silver): 2020
- IFFHS Legends

=== Manager ===
Juventus

- Coppa Italia: 2020–21
- Supercoppa Italiana: 2020

=== Orders ===
- 5th Class / Knight: Cavaliere Ordine al Merito della Repubblica Italiana: 2004

- 4th Class / Officer: Ufficiale Ordine al Merito della Repubblica Italiana: 2006

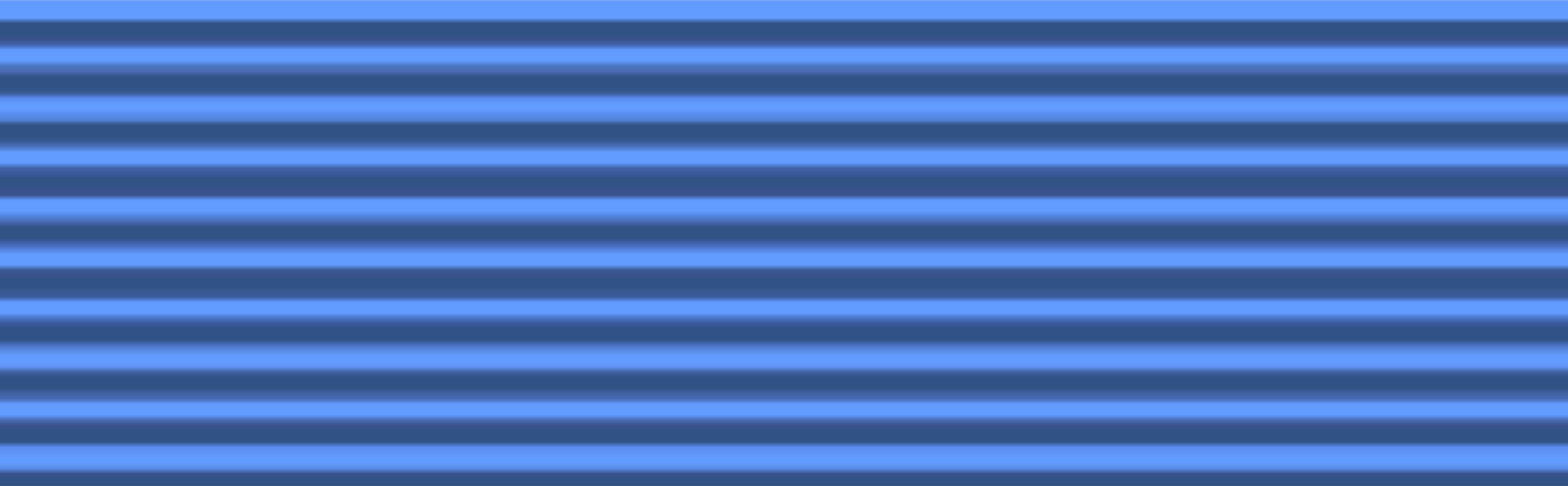
- CONI Golden Collar of Sports Merit: 2006

== See also ==
- List of footballers with 100 or more UEFA Champions League appearances
- List of men's footballers with 100 or more international caps
- List of celebrities who own wineries and vineyards

== Bibliography ==
- Alessandro Alciato, Andrea Pirlo, Penso quindi gioco, Milan, Mondadori, 2013, ISBN 88-04628-69-3 (I Think Therefore, I Play). (in Italian)
