= Maurizio Nassi =

Italian footballer and coach (born 1977)

Personal information
- Date of birth: 3 January 1977 (age 49)
- Place of birth: Taormina, Italy
- Height: 1.77 m (5 ft 10 in)
- Position: Forward

Team information
- Current team: Gela

Senior career*
Years	Team	Apps	(Gls)
1995–1996	Napoli	0	(0)
1996–1997	Atl. Catania	1	(0)
1997–1999	Ragusa	64	(19)
1999–2001	Gela	26	(11)
2000–2001	→ Reggina (loan)	2	(0)
2001–2002	Fermana	28	(8)
2002–2005	Lanciano	93	(24)
2005–2007	Padova	12	(0)
2006–2008	Ancona	42	(8)
2009	Brescia	16	(0)
2009–2010	Mantova	33	(9)
2010–2011	Cittadella	28	(2)
2011–2013	Alessandria	22	(6)
2013–2014	Licata	6	(1)
2014	Akragas	11	(1)
2014–2015	Giulianova	26	(6)
2015–2017	Gela	28	(3)
2017–2018	Gela FC		
2023–	Gela		
- * Club domestic league appearances and goals as of 7 May 2017

Maurizio Nassi (born 3 January 1977) is an Italian footballer who plays as a striker for Eccellenza club Gela.

On 31 August 2007, his contract was extended for one year.
