= Poli (surname) =

Poli is a surname of Italian origin. Notable people with the surname include:

- Afro Poli (1902–1988), Italian operatic baritone
- Andrea Poli (born 1989), Italian football player
- Antonio De Poli (born 1960), Italian politician
- Barbara Fusar-Poli (born 1972), Italian ice dancer
- Dante Poli (born 1976), Chilean football player
- Eros Poli (born 1963), Italian road bicycle racer
- Fabrizio Poli (born 1989), Italian football player
- Fausto Poli (1581–1653), Italian archbishop; private secretary to Pope Urban VIII
- Giuseppe Saverio Poli (1746–1825), Italian physicist, biologist and natural historian
- Jacopo Poli, Italian manager of the Poli Distillerie grappa distillery
- Mario Aurelio Poli (born 1947), Argentine Catholic cardinal
- Maurizio Poli (born 1964), Italian football player
- Ninsun Poli (contemporary), Assyrian singer and songwriter in Sweden
- Paolo Poli (1929–2016), Italian theatre actor
- Piero Poli (born 1960), Italian rower
- Riccardo Poli (born 1961), Italian computer scientist and professor
- Robert Edmund Poli (1936–2014), American labor union leader
- Sylvester Z. Poli (1859–1937), Italian-American sculptor and founder of the Poli theater chain
