= Davide Possanzini =

Italian footballer (born 1976)

Personal information
- Date of birth: 9 February 1976 (age 50)
- Place of birth: Loreto, Italy
- Height: 1.81 m (5 ft 11 in)
- Positions: Striker; attacking midfielder

Team information
- Current team: Südtirol (head coach)

Senior career*
| Years | Team | Apps | (Gls) |
| 1992–1994 | Recanatese | 35 | (4) |
| 1994–1995 | Torino | 0 | (0) |
| 1995–1996 | Lecco | 32 | (5) |
| 1997–1998 | Varese | 63 | (18) |
| 1998–2001 | Reggina | 73 | (13) |
| 2001–2002 | Sampdoria | 50 | (6) |
| 2002–2003 | Catania | 31 | (3) |
| 2003–2005 | AlbinoLeffe | 52 | (19) |
| 2005 | Palermo | 2 | (0) |
| 2005–2011 | Brescia | 190 | (58) |
| 2011–2012 | Lugano | 9 | (2) |
| 2012 | Cremonese | 11 | (6) |
| Total | | 548 | (134) |

Managerial career
- 2023: Brescia
- 2023–2025: Mantova
- 2026–: Südtirol
- * Club domestic league appearances and goals

Davide Possanzini (born 9 February 1976) is an Italian football manager and former professional player who is the manager of Serie B club Südtirol.

== Playing career ==
Possanzini started his career with the amateur team Recanatese in 1992. He was signed by Torino in 1994 but never made a first-team appearance and was later sold to Serie C2 side Lecco. He left Lecco after two seasons to join Varese, another Serie C2 club, helping the biancorossi to ensure promotion to Serie C1.

Signed by Serie B club Reggina in September 1998, he immediately won a personal second promotion, scoring nine goals in his first season with the amaranto. He made his Serie A debut on 29 August 1999 in a 1–1 tie at Juventus's home. In January 2001, after two and a half seasons with Reggina, he signed for Serie B fallen giants Sampdoria, but failed to make a breakthrough during his stay with the blucerchiati. After an unimpressive season with Catania in 2002–03, Possanzini was signed by Serie B minnows AlbinoLeffe, where he quickly regained his best form and proved himself as a key player for his new club.

In January 2005, Possanzini signed for Palermo and returned to Serie A. Still, several injuries prevented him from being actively part of the Sicilian side; he eventually played only twice with the rosanero before being sold again during the summer market, this time to Brescia as partial compensation in the deal that brought Andrea Caracciolo to Palermo. He is currently a mainstay for the rondinelle and scored 24 goals in his first two seasons with Brescia, both in Serie B.

In January 2009, Possanzini was banned for a year, along with Daniele Mannini, by the Court of Arbitration for Sport, at the request of the World Anti-Doping Agency, for being late at the anti-doping controls after Brescia's game with Chievo in December 2007. Both players were initially acquitted by the Italian Football Federation and successively condemned to a 15-day ban by CONI. The ban was successively suspended by the Court of Arbitration for Sport itself later in March and cancelled on 27 July 2009 after being proved there was no real intention to avoid the controls from Possanzini and Mannini.

== Coaching career ==
In 2013, Possanzini moved back to Brescia as a youth coach in charge of the Allievi Nazionali and then the Primavera (Under-19 squad). He subsequently joined the coaching staff of Roberto De Zerbi, following him during his tenures at Foggia, Palermo, Benevento, Sassuolo and FC Shakhtar Donetsk. In February 2022, together with De Zerbi and his coaching staff, he harrowingly fled from Ukraine in the aftermath of the Russian invasion.

On 16 June 2022, Possanzini agreed to return to Brescia as the club's Primavera youth coach. On 7 January 2023, he was named new head coach in charge of the first team following the dismissal of Pep Clotet, being however sacked just thirteen days later after suffering two defeats in both games in charge of the team.

On 16 June 2023, Possanzini was announced as the new head coach of Serie C club Mantova. Under his guidance, Mantova surprisingly topped the league table from the very beginning of the season despite the presence of other more ambitious teams in the league such as Padova and Vicenza, while playing an attacking football style reminiscent of his mentor De Zerbi that quickly won Possanzini national coverage. On 7 April 2024, Mantova mathematically won promotion to Serie B.

After guiding Mantova for the 2024–25 Serie B campaign, Possanzini was dismissed on 15 December 2025 after a negative start to the new season.

== Coaching statistics ==
As of match played 25 April 2024

| Team | Nat | From | To | Record | | | | | | | | Ref |
| Team | Nat | From | To | G | W | D | L | GF | GA | GD | Win % | Ref |
|---|---|---|---|---|---|---|---|---|---|---|---|---|
| Brescia | (Italy) | 6 February 2023 | 20 February 2023 | 2 | 0 | 0 | 2 | 0 | 2 | −2 | 0.00 | |
| Mantova | (Italy) | 16 June 2023 | 15 December 2025 | 38 | 24 | 8 | 6 | 71 | 31 | +40 | 63.16 | |
| Career totals | | | | 40 | 24 | 8 | 8 | 71 | 33 | +38 | 60.00 | — |

== Honours ==
=== Managerial ===
Mantova

- Serie C: 2023–24 (Group A)
