= Massimo Campo =

Italian footballer

Personal information
- Date of birth: 15 April 1975 (age 51)
- Place of birth: Messina, Italy
- Height: 1.78 m (5 ft 10 in)
- Position: Midfielder

Youth career
- 1990–1993: Catanzaro

Senior career*
Years	Team	Apps	(Gls)
1993–1997	Catanzaro	99	(16)
1997–2000	Reggina	29	(4)
2000	Castel di Sangro	9	(1)
2000–2001	Savoia	14	(1)
2001–2003	Nocerina	61	(14)
2003–2004	Catanzaro	11	(0)
2004–2005	Sora	36	(3)
2005–2007	Gubbio	46	(6)
2007–2008	Nuorese	16	(2)
2008–2009	Real Montecchio		
2009–2010	Castel San Pietro		
2010–2011	Real Montecchio		
Total		323	(47)
- * Club domestic league appearances and goals

Massimo Campo (born 15 April 1975) is an Italian former professional footballer who played as a midfielder.

== Career ==
A midfield player, Campo stood out especially in the early part of his career, with notable spells for southern Italian teams US Catanzaro and AS Reggina.

== Honours ==
Catanzaro

- Serie C1: 2003–04 (group B)
