= Ezio Brevi =

Italian footballer

Personal information
- Full name: Ezio Brevi
- Date of birth: 20 January 1970 (age 56)
- Place of birth: Rome, Italy
- Height: 1.82 m (6 ft 0 in)
- Position: Midfielder

Team information
- Current team: Voluntas Spoleto (head coach)

Senior career*
Years	Team	Apps	(Gls)
1991–1993	Corsico	61	(7)
1993–1996	Pro Sesto	61	(3)
1995–1996	Fiorenzuola	18	(1)
1996–1997	Triestina	30	(2)
1997–1999	Ternana	46	(5)
1999–2001	Reggina	57	(1)
2001–2002	Ternana	15	(1)
2001–2002	→Genoa (loan)	19	(2)
2002–2004	Ternana	76	(6)
2004–2005	Genoa	29	(0)
2005–2006	Catania	26	(1)
2006–2007	Siena	9	(1)
2007–2008	Venezia	27	(2)
2008–2010	Como	54	(4)
Total		528	(36)

Managerial career
- 2010–2011: Sporting Terni
- 2011–: Voluntas Spoleto
- * Club domestic league appearances and goals

Ezio Brevi (born 20 January 1970, in Rome) is an Italian association football manager and former player, currently serving as head coach of Serie D side Voluntas Spoleto. Throughout his playing career, he played as a midfielder.

== Career ==
=== Player ===
He played from 1991 to 2010 for Corsico, Pro Sesto, Fiorenzuola, Triestina, Ternana, Reggina, Genoa, Catania, Siena, Venezia and Como.

=== Coach ===
He passed his category 2 coaching exam in 2011 (UEFA A License), which made him eligible to coach Lega Pro teams or below. He also obtained a UEFA B License in 2008.

In the 2010–11 season Brevi was the coach of Sporting Terni in Serie D.

Since the 2011–12 season he has serves as the head coach of Serie D side Voluntas Spoleto

== Personal life ==
Ezio's older brother, Oscar, was also a footballer and is also currently a manager, who last served as head coach of Cremonese.
