= Giovanni Morabito =

Italian footballer

Personal information
- Date of birth: 26 January 1978 (age 48)
- Place of birth: Reggio Calabria, Italy
- Height: 1.78 m (5 ft 10 in)
- Position: Defender

Team information
- Current team: Licata

Youth career
- Reggina

Senior career*
Years	Team	Apps	(Gls)
1996–1997	Crotone	38	(5)
1997–1998	Reggina	31	(1)
1998–1999	Vicenza	13	(0)
1999–2003	Reggina	120	(1)
2003	Genoa	17	(0)
2004	Reggina	3	(0)
2005	Catanzaro	16	(0)
2005–2006	Cesena	34	(2)
2006	Reggina	1	(0)
2007	Crotone	9	(0)
2007–2008	Verona	20	(0)
2009	Virtus Lanciano		
2010	Igea Virtus		
2011	Messina		
- * Club domestic league appearances and goals as of 28 December 2008

Giovanni Morabito (born 26 January 1978 in Reggio Calabria) is a retired Italian footballer, who last played as a defender for Licata.

== Career ==
After beginning his youth career with Reggina, he made his professional debut in Serie D while on loan with Crotone during the 1996–97 season, making 38 appearances, and scoring 5 goals, helping the club to gain promotion to Serie C2. During the 1997–98 season, he made his Serie B debut with Reggina under manager Franco Colomba, making 31 appearances and scoring a goal.

In 1998, he was acquired by Vicenza, making his Serie A debut with the club that season under his former Reggina manager, making 13 appearances. The following season, he returned to Reggina, where he remained for four more seasons, three of which were in Serie A, and one in Serie B, which concluded with a Serie A promotion in 2002. In total, he made 120 appearances for the club, scoring his only goal in a memorable match against Milan on the final day of the 2000–01 Serie A season.

After only 2 appearances with Reggina during the 2003–04 season, in January 2004, he was loaned to Genoa, making 17 appearances in Serie B. After returning to his club for the 2004–05 Serie A season, he only made one appearance before being sold to Catanzaro, where he made 16 appearances in Serie B. He spent the following season in Serie B with Cesena, making 36 appearances and scoring 2 goals.

He returned to Reggina again the following season, but failed to make a single league appearance, and in 2007 he was loaned to Crotone, where he made 9 appearances. The following season, he moved to Hellas Verona once again under Colomba. In January 2009 he transferred to Prima Divisione side Virtus Lanciano. In March 2010, he moved to Igea Virtus, in the Seconda Divisione.

In January 2011, he moved to Messina and in September he moved to Licata. After making only 5 appearances in 2 months, he cancelled his contract and retired at the age of 34 to begin a coaching career.
