= Antonio Castelli =

Italian financial figure

Antonio Castelli is an Italian financial figure who, according to legal and regulatory filings, as well as major media outlets, has been convicted of major financial crimes.

His name appears on the Falciani List, alleged committers of tax fraud.

== Criminal investigation for money laundering ==
In 2009, Castelli’s firm, Inprogramme, tried to transfer a bond worth a $1 billion, but was immediately subject to criminal investigation. The company had only been formed the day before and then with only a few dollars of capital, from two subscribers.

== Connection to $6 billion Qatar fraud judgment ==
Castelli defended the attempted bond transfer as arising from his partnership with a Sheikh of the Qatar Royal family, specifically Sheikh Fahd bin Ahmad bin Mohamed bin Thani Al-Thani. This Sheikh was in turn identified by his full name, in court filings (testimony of prosecutor Stefano Civati), and the major paper of Milan, Corriere della Sera. Furthermore, Sheikh Fahd bin Ahmad bin Mohamed bin Thani Al-Thani is cited in an Inprogramme prospectus as a Director of its Switzerland corporation.

That firm, in turn, owns the bank account where the Swifthold bond was sent as part of the agreement between Fast Trading Group and Swifthold, which is central in the $6 billion High Court Award against the Sheikh for his fraud against Swifthold, a family’s charitable trust based in Spain, in 2011. Furthermore, Abdulsalam Al-Hamri, the appointed CEO of Fast Trading Group, was a director of this Inprogramme entity.

In the Qatar enforcement effort on this judgment, Castelli is cited as a partner of the Sheikh.

== Market manipulation ==
In September 2010, Castelli, along with his collaborators, were fined €450,000 by CONSOB, the Italian financial regulator, for market manipulation between February 19, 2007 and May 30, 2007. The order specifically references that Castelli was operating through their company, InProgramme SAS.

== Ponzi scheme ==
In 2012, Castelli was charged with defrauding 600 northern Italian investors of some €20 million, earning him the label “The Madoff of Turin.” This was undertaken likewise through Inprogamme.

== Insurance fraud ==
From 2009 to 2011, Antonio Castelli, through United Consulting Finance Societa Finanziaria SPA, issued at least 5,875 fraudulent insurance policies. The aggregate value of the policies was approximately €465 million. Among the purchasers of the fraudulent policies were government entities, commercial entities, and private individuals. The scam involved underwriting insurance policies, collecting the premiums, and then failing to honor any policies when the policyholders attempted to collect their payouts.

Additionally, in 2012, it appears that United Consulting Finance was fined €386,640 for various failures to file proper documentation with the Italian regulators.

A 2014 article clearly links Castelli to Inprogramme and the frauds cited above.
