= Maurizio Poli =

Italian footballer

Personal information
- Date of birth: 14 January 1964 (age 62)
- Place of birth: Pisa, Italy
- Height: 1.79 m (5 ft 10 in)
- Positions: Left midfielder; left-back

Senior career*
Years	Team	Apps	(Gls)
1981–1983	Cuoiopelli	25	(12)
1983–1985	Taranto	14	(3)
1985–1987	Pro Cisterna	55	(13)
1987–1989	Frosinone	51	(8)
1989–1990	Cagliari	60	(4)
1990–2000	Reggina	264	(6)
2000–2001	Savoia	7	(0)
2001	Pro Cisterna	0	(0)
Total		452	(45)
- * Club domestic league appearances and goals

Maurizio Poli (born 14 January 1964) is an Italian former professional footballer who played as a left midfielder and left-back.

== Career ==
Having started his Cuoiopelli career in 1981, Poli would go on to become one of the main players in the history of AS Reggina, where he made 264 appearances during 11 seasons defending the club. He ended his professional career in 2001 at Pro Cisterna but continued playing until 2013 in amateur divisions.

== Honours ==
Cagliari

- Coppa Italia Serie C: 1988–89
- Serie C1: 1988–89 (group B)

Reggina

- Serie C1: 1994–95 (group B)
