= Giuseppe Baronchelli =

Italian footballer and manager

Personal information
- Full name: Giuseppe Baronchelli
- Date of birth: 9 March 1971 (age 55)
- Place of birth: Brescia, Italy
- Position: Defender

Team information
- Current team: Montichiari (manager)

Senior career*
Years	Team	Apps	(Gls)
1987–1992	Ospitaletto	101	(0)
1992–1993	Palazzolo	26	(0)
1993–1995	Brescia	60	(6)
1995–1996	Lucchese	34	(0)
1996–1997	Fiorenzuola	26	(2)
1997–1998	Lecce	16	(0)
1998–1999	Albacete	15	(1)
1999–2000	Cesena	52	(4)
2000–2002	Catania	47	(3)
2002–2003	Fiorentina	18	(1)
2003–2004	Pro Sesto	13	(0)
2004–2005	Caravaggese	29	(3)
2005–2006	Montichiari	25	(0)
Total		462	(20)

Managerial career
- 2007–: Montichiari
- * Club domestic league appearances and goals

Giuseppe Baronchelli (born 9 March 1971) is an Italian association football coach and former professional player who manages Montichiari in Serie D.

== Career ==
During his playing career, Baronchelli played as a defender for Ospitaletto, Palazzolo, Brescia, Lucchese, Fiorenzuola, Lecce, Albacete, Cesena, Catania, Fiorentina, Pro Sesto, Caravaggese and Montichiari.

While in Brescia, he received death threats and was attacked on the street due to his team's bad performance in the 1994–95 Serie A.
