= 1991–92 SSC Napoli season =

SSC Napoli
1991-92 season
- Owner: Corrado Ferlaino
- President: Corrado Ferlaino
- Head coach: Claudio Ranieri
- Stadium: San Paolo
- Serie A: 4th (In 1992–93 UEFA Cup)
- Coppa Italia: Last 16
- Top goalscorer: League: Careca (15); All: Careca (17)
Home colours	Away colours	Third colours

SSC Napoli finished a creditable fourth in its first season without the club legend Diego Maradona in the squad. With the Argentinian having failed a doping test in the spring 1991, Napoli was facing an uphill battle, but coped remarkably well, actually improving on its fortunes from Maradona's final season with the club.

== Squad ==
Note: Flags indicate national team as defined under FIFA eligibility rules; some limited exceptions apply. Players may hold more than one non-FIFA nationality.

Pos.	Nation	Player
GK	ITA	Giovanni Galli
GK	ITA	Marco Sansonetti
GK	ITA	Angelo Pagotto
DF	ITA	Ciro Ferrara
DF	ITA	Giovanni Francini
DF	FRA	Laurent Blanc
DF	ITA	Giancarlo Corradini
DF	ITA	Massimo Tarantino
DF	ITA	Massimo Filardi
DF	ITA	Vittorio Pusceddu
DF	ITA	Fabio Cannavaro

Pos.	Nation	Player
MF	BRA	Alemão
MF	ITA	Fernando De Napoli
MF	ITA	Stefano De Agostino
MF	ITA	Massimo Mauro
MF	ITA	Massimo Crippa
MF	ITA	Raffaele Ametrano
FW	ITA	Gianfranco Zola
FW	BRA	Careca
FW	ITA	Michele Padovano
FW	ITA	Andrea Silenzi

=== Transfers ===
In
Pos.	Name	from	Type
DF	Laurent Blanc	HSC Montpellier	
DF	Vittorio Pusceddu	Hellas Verona	
FW	Michele Padovano	A.C. Pisa 1909	
MF	Stefano De Agostini	A.C. Reggiana	

Out
Pos.	Name	To	Type
FW	Diego Maradona		
DF	Gianluca Francesconi	A.C. Reggiana	
DF	Alessandro Renica	Hellas Verona	
DF	Marco Baroni	Bologna F.C.	
MF	Giorgio Venturin	Torino	loan ended
FW	Giuseppe Incocciati	Bologna F.C.	

== Competitions ==
=== Serie A ===
==== League table ====
Pos	Team	Pld	W	D	L	GF	GA	GD	Pts	Qualification or relegation
2	Juventus	34	18	12	4	45	22	+23	48	Qualification to UEFA Cup
3	Torino	34	14	15	5	42	20	+22	43	Qualification to UEFA Cup
4	Napoli	34	15	12	7	56	40	+16	42	Qualification to UEFA Cup
5	Roma	34	13	14	7	37	31	+6	40	Qualification to UEFA Cup
6	Sampdoria	34	11	16	7	38	31	+7	38	

Source: 1991–92 Serie A, RSSSF.com
Rules for classification: 1) Points; 2) Head-to-head points; 3) Head-to-head goal difference; 4) Goal difference; 5) Goals scored; 6) Draw.

==== Results by round ====
Round	1	2	3	4	5	6	7	8	9	10	11	12	13	14	15	16	17	18	19	20	21	22	23	24	25	26	27	28	29	30	31	32	33	34
Ground	H	A	H	A	H	A	A	H	A	H	A	H	H	A	H	A	H	A	H	A	H	A	H	H	A	H	A	H	A	A	H	A	H	A
Result	W	D	D	D	W	W	L	D	W	D	W	D	W	D	L	W	W	D	W	L	L	W	W	L	D	D	W	W	W	D	L	D	L	W
Position	5	3	4	4	2	1	3	3	3	3	3	3	3	3	3	3	3	3	3	3	3	3	3	3	3	3	3	3	3	3	3	3	4	4

Source: Competitive matches
A = Away; H = Home; W = Win; D = Draw; L = Loss; = 1992–93 European Cup; = 1992–93 UEFA Cup; = 1992–93 Serie B

=== Matches ===
1 September 1991 1	Napoli	1–0	Atalanta	Naples
	Zola 84'	Report		Stadium: San Paolo

8 September 1991 2	Cremonese	0–0	Napoli	Cremona
		Report		Stadium: Giovanni Zini

15 September 1991 3	Napoli	2–2	Parma	Naples
	Zola 20'; Careca 40'	Report	Corradini 13' (o.g.); Brolin 50'	Stadium: San Paolo

22 September 1991 4	Torino	0–0	Napoli	Turin
		Report		Stadium: delle Alpi

29 September 1991 5	Napoli	3–1	Verona	Naples
	Crippa 7'; Careca 59'; Padovano 68'	Report	Prytz 74' (pen.)	Stadium: San Paolo

6 October 1991 6	Ascoli	1–4	Napoli	Ascoli Piceno
	Zaini 28'	Report	Careca 2, 60'; Zola 51, 85'	Stadium: Cino e Lillo Del Duca

20 October 1991 7	Napoli	0–1	Juventus	Naples
		Report	De Agostini 45'	Stadium: San Paolo

27 October 1991 8	Inter	0–0	Napoli	Milan
		Report		Stadium: Giuseppe Meazza

3 November 1991 9	Napoli	2–1	Sampdoria	Naples
	Zola 3'; Careca 38' (pen.)	Report	Blanc 40' (o.g.)	Stadium: San Paolo

17 November 1991 10	Roma	1–1	Napoli	Rome
	Di Mauro 43'	Report	Zola 77'	Stadium: Olimpico

24 November 1991 11	Napoli	1–0	Bari	Naples
	Giampaolo 53' (o.g.)	Report		Stadium: San Paolo

1 December 1991 12	Lazio	3–3	Napoli	Rome
	Riedle 25, 57'; Sosa 68' (pen.)	Report	Ferrara 43'; Blanc 79'; Zola 90'	Stadium: Olimpico

8 December 1991 13	Napoli	4–0	Cagliari	Naples
	Careca 28, 43'; Francini 68'; Padovano 77' (pen.)	Report		Stadium: San Paolo

15 December 1991 14	Napoli	3–3	Foggia	Naples
	Padovano 12'; Careca 21, 53'	Report	Signori 22, 88'; Shalimov 77'	Stadium: San Paolo

5 January 1992 15	Milan	5–0	Napoli	Milan
	Maldini 1'; Rijkaard 27'; Massaro 42'; Donadoni 65' van Basten 81'	Report		Stadium: San Siro

12 January 1992 16	Napoli	1–0	Fiorentina	Naples
	Crippa 51'	Report		Stadium: San Paolo

19 January 1992 17	Genoa	3–4	Napoli	Genoa
	Skuhravý 30, 58, 90'	Report	Zola 14'; Silenzi 29'; Careca 40'; Alemão 84'	Stadium: Luigi Ferraris

26 January 1992 18	Atalanta	1–1	Napoli	Bergamo
	Bianchezi 69' (pen.)	Report	Silenzi 17'	Stadium: Comunale

2 February 1992 19	Napoli	3–0	Cremonese	Naples
	Zola 23'; Blanc 27, 53'	Report		Stadium: San Paolo

9 February 1992 20	Parma	2–1	Napoli	Parma
	Melli 38' (pen.); Grün 90'	Report	Careca 21' (pen.)	Stadium: Ennio Tardini

16 February 1992 21	Napoli	0–1	Torino	Naples
		Report	Fusi 79'	Stadium: San Paolo

23 February 1992 22	Verona	0–1	Napoli	Verona
		Report	Silenzi 66'	Stadium: Marcantonio Bentegodi

1 March 1992 23	Napoli	5–1	Ascoli	Naples
	Careca 7'; Padovano 16, 61'; Francini 30'; Alemão 70'	Report	Ferrara 47' (o.g.)	Stadium: San Paolo

8 March 1992 24	Juventus	3–1	Napoli	Turin
	Baggio 3, 44'; Marocchi 54'	Report	Padovano 85'	Stadium: delle Alpi

15 March 1992 25	Napoli	1–1	Inter	Naples
	Zola 13'	Report	Desideri 52'	Stadium: San Paolo

29 March 1992 26	Sampdoria	1–1	Napoli	Genoa
	Lanna 59'	Report	Padovano 47'	Stadium: Luigi Ferraris

5 April 1992 27	Napoli	3–2	Roma	Naples
	Silenzi 47'; Careca 55'; Zola 66'	Report	Corradini 8' (o.g.); Giannini 18'	Stadium: San Paolo

12 April 1992 28	Bari	1–3	Napoli	Bari
	Platt 21' (pen.)	Report	Zola 47'; Bellucci 52' (o.g.); Alemão 89'	Stadium: della Vittoria

18 April 1992 29	Napoli	3–0	Lazio	Naples
	Blanc 25'; Careca 57, 81'	Report		Stadium: San Paolo

26 April 1992 30	Cagliari	0–0	Napoli	Cagliari
		Report		Stadium: Sant'Elia

3 May 1992 31	Foggia	1–0	Napoli	Foggia
	Padalino 84'	Report		Stadium: Pino Zaccheria; Referee: Massimo Chiesa

10 May 1992 32	Napoli	1–1	Milan	Naples
	Blanc 62'	Report	Rijkaard 37'	Stadium: San Paolo

17 May 1992 33	Fiorentina	4–2	Napoli	Florence
	Borgonovo 29, 39, 77'; Dunga 58'	Report	Blanc 37'; De Napoli 50'	Stadium: Artemio Franchi

24 May 1992 34	Napoli	1–0	Genoa	Naples
	Mauro 70'	Report		Stadium: San Paolo

=== Coppa Italia ===
Second round

28 August 1991 First leg	Napoli	1–0	Reggiana	Naples
	Careca 76'			Stadium: Stadio San Paolo; Referee: Carlo Dinelli

3 September 1991 Second leg	Reggiana	0–0 (0–1 agg.)	Napoli	Reggio Emilia
				Stadium: Mappei; Referee: Alfredo Trentalange

==== Round of 16 ====
30 October 1991 First leg	Roma	1–0	Napoli	Rome
	Rizzitelli 85' (pen.)			Stadium: Stadio Olimpico; Referee: Tullio Lanese

4 December 1991 Second leg	Napoli	3–2 (3–3a agg.)	Roma	Naples
	Pusceddu 44'; Careca 50', 70'		Rizzitelli 18', 26'	Stadium: Stadio San Paolo; Referee: Rosario Lo Bello

== Statistics ==
=== Players statistics ===
No.	Pos	Nat	Player	Total		Serie A		Coppa	
No.	Pos	Nat	Player	Apps	Goals	Apps	Goals	Apps	Goals
	GK	(Italy) ITA	Giovanni Galli	37	-43	33	-40	4	-3
	DF	(Italy) ITA	Ciro Ferrara	34	1	32	1	2	0
	DF	(France) FRA	Laurent Blanc	34	6	31	6	3	0
	DF	(Italy) ITA	Giancarlo Corradini	34	0	30	0	4	0
	DF	(Italy) ITA	Giovanni Francini	34	2	31	2	3	0
	MF	(Italy) ITA	Massimo Crippa	32	2	26+2	2	4	0
	MF	(Brazil) BRA	Alemão	32	3	29	3	3	0
	MF	(Italy) ITA	Fernando De Napoli	32	1	26+3	1	3	0
	FW	(Italy) ITA	Michele Padovano	31	7	18+9	7	4	0
	FW	(Brazil) BRA	Careca	37	17	33	15	4	2
	FW	(Italy) ITA	Gianfranco Zola	38	13	33+1	12	4	1
	GK	(Italy) ITA	Marco Sansonetti	1	0	1	0	0	0
	FW	(Italy) ITA	Andrea Silenzi	22	4	16+4	4	2	0
	DF	(Italy) ITA	Vittorio Pusceddu	25	1	11+10	0	4	1
	DF	(Italy) ITA	Massimo Tarantino	15	0	11+3	0	1	0
	MF	(Italy) ITA	De Agostini	24	0	7+14	0	3	0
	MF	(Italy) ITA	Massimo Mauro	10	1	5+5	1		
	DF	(Italy) ITA	Massimo Filardi	5	0	1+4	0		
	GK	(Italy) ITA	Angelo Pagotto	0	0	0	0		
	DF	(Italy) ITA	Fabio Cannavaro	0	0	0	0		
	DF	(Italy) ITA	M. Baroni	1	0	0	0	1	0

- Source: http://calcio-seriea.net/presenze/1991/1030/

== Sources ==
- RSSSF - Italy 1991/92
