= 1990–91 SSC Napoli season =

Napoli
1990–91 season
- Owner: Corrado Ferlaino
- President: Corrado Ferlaino
- Head coach: Alberto Bigon
- Stadium: San Paolo
- Serie A: 8th
- Coppa Italia: Semi-final
- Supercoppa Italiana: Winners
- European Cup: Last 16
- Top goalscorer: League: Careca (9); All: Careca (12)
Home colours	Away colours	Third colours

SSC Napoli had a disappointing Serie A title defence, where captain Diego Maradona failed a drugs test and would not play for the club again. The reliable home form of the 1989–90 season disappeared, whilst the European Cup dream ended already in the Last 16 against Spartak Moscow. The team did, however, win the Supercoppa, which was the final title of the club's successful Maradona era.

== Squad ==
Note: Flags indicate national team as defined under FIFA eligibility rules; some limited exceptions apply. Players may hold more than one non-FIFA nationality.

Pos.	Nation	Player
GK	ITA	Giovanni Galli
GK	ITA	Giuseppe Taglialatela
GK	ITA	Raffaele Di Fusco
GK	ITA	Cristiano Scalabrelli
DF	ITA	Ciro Ferrara
DF	ITA	Giovanni Francini
DF	ITA	Gianluca Francesconi
DF	ITA	Giancarlo Corradini
DF	ITA	Marco Baroni
DF	ITA	Alessandro Renica
DF	ITA	Ivan Rizzardi
DF	ITA	Antonio Telari

Pos.	Nation	Player
MF	BRA	Alemão
MF	ITA	Fernando De Napoli
MF	ITA	Giorgio Venturin
MF	ITA	Massimo Mauro
MF	ITA	Massimo Crippa
MF	ITA	Luca Altomare
MF	ITA	Fabrizio Ferrigno
FW	BRA	Careca
FW	ARG	Diego Maradona
FW	ITA	Andrea Silenzi
FW	ITA	Gianfranco Zola
FW	ITA	Giuseppe Incocciati

=== Transfers ===
In
Pos.	Name	from	Type
FW	Andrea Silenzi	AC Reggiana	
GK	Giovanni Galli	AC Milan	
FW	Giuseppe Incocciati	Pisa	
DF	Ivan Rizzardi	Cremonese	
MF	Giorgio Venturin	Torino	co-ownership

Out
Pos.	Name	To	Type
FW	Andrea Carnevale	A.S. Roma	
GK	Raffaele Di Fusco	Torino	loan
MF	Luca Fusi	Torino	
GK	Giuliano Giuliani	Udinese Calcio	
DF	Tebaldo Bigliardi	Atalanta B.C.	

== Special kit ==
For the Supercoppa the team wore a special kit.

Napoli

== Competitions ==
=== Supercoppa ===
1 September 1990	Napoli	5–1	Juventus	Naples
	Silenzi 8', 45'; Careca 20', 71'; Crippa 44'		Baggio 39'	Stadium: San Paolo; Attendance: 62,404; Referee: Carlo Longhi

=== Serie A ===
==== League table ====
Pos	Team	Pld	W	D	L	GF	GA	GD	Pts	Qualification or relegation
6	Parma (Note: Parma qualified for the 1991–92 UEFA Cup as a substitute for the banned Milan.)	34	13	12	9	35	31	+4	38	Qualification to UEFA Cup
7	Juventus	34	13	11	10	45	32	+13	37	
8	Napoli	34	11	15	8	37	37	0	37	
9	Roma	34	11	14	9	43	37	+6	36	Qualification to Cup Winners' Cup
10	Atalanta	34	11	13	10	38	37	+1	35	

Source: 1990–91 Serie A, RSSSF.com
Rules for classification: 1) Points; 2) Head-to-head points; 3) Head-to-head goal difference; 4) Goal difference; 5) Goals scored; 6) Draw.

==== Results by round ====
Round	1	2	3	4	5	6	7	8	9	10	11	12	13	14	15	16	17	18	19	20	21	22	23	24	25	26	27	28	29	30	31	32	33	34
Ground	A	H	A	H	A	H	A	H	A	H	A	H	A	H	A	H	A	H	A	H	A	H	A	H	A	H	A	H	H	A	H	A	H	A
Result	D	L	L	W	D	D	W	D	L	L	W	D	W	D	L	D	L	D	D	W	D	W	L	D	W	L	D	D	W	W	W	D	D	W
Position	8	12	15	11	12	11	7	8	8	12	11	10	7	7	11	9	11	11	11	10	10	10	10	10	10	11	11	11	10	8	8	8	8	8

Source: Competitive matches
A = Away; H = Home; W = Win; D = Draw; L = Loss; = 1991–92 European Cup; = 1991–92 UEFA Cup; = 1991-92 Serie B

==== Matches ====
9 September 1990 1	Lecce	0–0	Napoli	Lecce
		Report		Stadium: Via del Mare

16 September 1990 2	Napoli	1–2	Cagliari	Naples
	Careca 45' (pen.)	Report	Rocco 34'; Corradini 69' (o.g.)	Stadium: San Paolo

23 September 1990 3	Parma	1–0	Napoli	Parma
	Osio 64'	Report		Stadium: Ennio Tardini

30 September 1990 4	Napoli	2–1	Pisa	Naples
	Maradona 39' (pen.); Careca 90'	Report	Padovano 65'	Stadium: San Paolo

7 October 1990 5	Genoa	1–1	Napoli	Genoa
	Aguilera 56'	Report	Incocciati 53'	Stadium: Luigi Ferraris

21 October 1990 6	Napoli	1–1	Milan	Naples
	Maradona 83' (pen.)	Report	Gullit 88'	Stadium: San Paolo

28 October 1990 7	Napoli	1–0	Fiorentina	Naples
	Ferrara 1'	Report		Stadium: San Paolo

11 November 1990 8	Bari	0–0	Napoli	Bari
		Report		Stadium: della Vittoria

18 November 1990 9	Napoli	1–4	Sampdoria	Naples
	Incocciati 40'	Report	Vialli 45, 60'; Mancini 45, 90'	Stadium: San Paolo

25 November 1990 10	Inter	2–1	Napoli	Milan
	Matthäus 52'; Baroni 65' (o.g.)	Report	Careca 53'	Stadium: Giuseppe Meazza

2 December 1990 11	Napoli	2–1	Torino	Naples
	Maradona 80' (pen.); Incocciati 88'	Report	Bresciani 83'	Stadium: San Paolo

9 December 1990 12	Atalanta	0–0	Napoli	Bergamo
		Report		Stadium: Comunale

16 December 1990 13	Napoli	2–1	Lazio	Naples
	Careca 6'; Incocciati 22'	Report	Sosa 17'	Stadium: San Paolo

30 December 1990 14	Cesena	0–0	Napoli	Cesena
		Report		Stadium: Dino Manuzzi

6 January 1991 15	Juventus	1–0	Napoli	Turin
	Casiraghi 87'	Report		Stadium: delle Alpi

13 January 1991 16	Napoli	1–1	Roma	Naples
	Zola 15'	Report	Salsano 65'	Stadium: San Paolo

20 January 1991 17	Bologna	1–0	Napoli	Bologna
	Notaristefano 89'	Report		Stadium: Renato Dall'Ara

27 January 1991 18	Napoli	2–2	Lecce	Naples
	Incocciati 8'; Careca 70'	Report	Pasculli 34' (pen.); Virdis 87' (pen.)	Stadium: San Paolo

3 February 1991 19	Cagliari	1–1	Napoli	Cagliari
	Cornacchia 30'	Report	Zola 68'	Stadium: Sant'Elia

10 February 1991 20	Napoli	4–2	Parma	Naples
	Maradona 25' (pen.), 69' (pen.); De Napoli 38'; Careca 72'	Report	Minotti 52'; Osio 81'	Stadium: San Paolo

17 February 1991 21	Pisa	1–1	Napoli	Pisa
	Padovano 60'	Report	Ferrara 47'	Stadium: Arena Garibaldi

24 February 1991 22	Napoli	1–0	Genoa	Naples
	Zola 56'	Report		Stadium: San Paolo

3 March 1991 23	Milan	4–1	Napoli	Milan
	Ferrara 21' (o.g.); Gullit 41'; Rijkaard 57'; Gullit 67'	Report	Incocciati 73'	Stadium: San Siro

10 March 1991 24	Fiorentina	0–0	Napoli	Florence
		Report		Stadium: Comunale

17 March 1991 25	Napoli	1–0	Bari	Naples
	Zola 55'	Report		Stadium: San Paolo

24 March 1991 26	Sampdoria	4–1	Napoli	Genoa
	Cerezo 12'; Vialli 19, 64'; Lombardo 85'	Report	Maradona 75' (pen.)	Stadium: Luigi Ferraris

30 March 1991 27	Napoli	1–1	Inter	Naples
	Careca 71'	Report	Matthäus 70'	Stadium: San Paolo

7 April 1991 28	Torino	1–1	Napoli	Turin
	Policano 19' (pen.)	Report	Careca 20'	Stadium: delle Alpi

14 April 1991 29	Napoli	2–0	Atalanta	Naples
	Silenzi 24'; Renica 37'	Report		Stadium: San Paolo

21 April 1991 30	Lazio	0–2	Napoli	Rome
		Report	Alemão 54'; Zola 86'	Stadium: Olimpico

5 May 1991 31	Napoli	1–0	Cesena	Naples
	Francini 40'	Report		Stadium: San Paolo

12 May 1991 32	Napoli	1–1	Juventus	Naples
	Silenzi 32'	Report	Alessio 54'	Stadium: San Paolo

19 May 1991 33	Roma	1–1	Napoli	Rome
	Carboni 15'	Report	Rizzardi 80'	Stadium: Olimpico

26 May 1991 34	Napoli	3–2	Bologna	Naples
	Zola 4'; Careca 9'; Incocciati 52'	Report	Détári 80', 90' (pen.)	Stadium: San Paolo

=== Coppa Italia ===
Second round

Napoli	3–0	Cosenza	Naples
Ferrara; Maradona; Careca			Stadium: San Paolo; Attendance: 39 000

Cosenza	0–2	Napoli
		Crippa; Mauro	Attendance: 18 476

Eightfinals

Napoli	2–1	Fiorentina	Naples
Silenzi; Incocciati			Stadium: San Paolo; Attendance: 45 600

Fiorentina	0–0	Napoli	Florence
			Stadium: Comunale; Attendance: 34 400

Quarterfinals

Napoli	0–1	Bologna	Naples
			Stadium: San Paolo; Attendance: 50 631

Bologna	1–3	Napoli	Florence
		Mauro; Ferrara; Incocciati	Stadium: Comunale; Attendance: 25 550

Semifinals

12 March 1991	Napoli	1–0	Sampdoria	Naples
	Maradona 22'			Stadium: San Paolo

3 April 1991	Sampdoria	2–0 (2–1 agg.)	Napoli	Genoa
	Vialli 27' (pen.); Invernizzi 88'			Stadium: Luigi Ferraris

=== European Cup ===
19 September 1990	Napoli (Italy)	3–0	(Hungary) Újpest	Naples
20:30 CET	Baroni 35'; Maradona 44', 77'	Report		Stadium: San Paolo; Attendance: 39 327; Referee: (Belgium) Goethals

3 October 1990	Újpest (Hungary)	0–2	(Italy) Napoli	Budapest
18:30 CET		Report	15' Incocciati; 40' Alemão	Stadium: Megyeri úti Stadium; Referee: (France) Bouillet

==== Eightfinals ====
24 October 1990	Napoli (Italy)	0–0	(Soviet Union) Spartak Moscow	Naples
20:30 CET		Report		Stadium: San Paolo; Attendance: 50 000; Referee: (Germany) Schmidhuber

7 November 1990	Spartak Moscow (Soviet Union)	0–0 (0–0 agg.) (5–3 p)	(Italy) Napoli	Moscow
15:00 CET		Report		Stadium: Central Stadium Lenin; Attendance: 86 000; Referee: (France) Girard
	Penalties
	Karpin (penalty scored); Shalimov (penalty scored); Shmarov (penalty scored); Kulkov (penalty scored); Mostovoi (penalty scored)		(penalty scored) Ferrara; (penalty scored) Mauro; (penalty missed) Baroni; (penalty scored) Maradona

== Statistics ==
=== Players statistics ===
No.	Pos	Nat	Player	Total		Serie A		Coppa		European Cup	
No.	Pos	Nat	Player	Apps	Goals	Apps	Goals	Apps	Goals	Apps	Goals
	GK	(Italy) ITA	Giovanni Galli	43	-37	33	-33	6	-4	4	0
	DF	(Italy) ITA	Ciro Ferrara	40	4	29	2	8	2	3	0
	DF	(Italy) ITA	Giancarlo Corradini	38	0	30	0	6	0	2	0
	DF	(Italy) ITA	Marco Baroni	31	1	21	0	6	0	4	1
	DF	(Italy) ITA	Giovanni Francini	35	1	25	1	6	0	4	0
	MF	(Italy) ITA	Massimo Crippa	42	1	30	0	8	1	4	0
	MF	(Italy) ITA	Fernando De Napoli	37	1	27	1	6	0	4	0
	MF	(Italy) ITA	Giorgio Venturin	41	0	29+2	0	7	0	3	0
	FW	(Brazil) BRA	Careca	37	10	29	9	6	1	2	0
	FW	(Argentina) ARG	Diego Maradona	25	10	18	6	3	2	4	2
	FW	(Italy) ITA	Gianfranco Zola	29	6	18+2	6	7	0	2	0
	GK	(Italy) ITA	Giuseppe Taglialatela	5	-5	1+2	-4	2	-1	0	0
	MF	(Brazil) BRA	Alemão	31	2	21	1	6	0	4	1
	FW	(Italy) ITA	Giuseppe Incocciati	32	11	19+4	7	6	3	3	1
	DF	(Italy) ITA	Alessandro Renica	18	1	12+3	1	3	0		
	FW	(Italy) ITA	Andrea Silenzi	27	3	11+8	2	5	1	3	0
	MF	(Italy) ITA	Massimo Mauro	23	1	11+3	0	6	1	3	0
	DF	(Italy) ITA	Ivan Rizzardi	31	1	9+16	1	4	0	2	0
	DF	(Italy) ITA	Antonio Telari	1	0	1	0				
	DF	(Italy) ITA	Gianluca Francesconi	1	0	0+1	0				
	GK	(Italy) ITA	Raffaele Di Fusco	0	0	0	0				
	GK	(Italy) ITA	Cristiano Scalabrelli	0	0	0	0				
	MF	(Italy) ITA	Luca Altomare	1	0	0	0	1	0		
	MF	(Italy) ITA	Fabrizio Ferrigno	0	0	0	0				

- Source: http://calcio-seriea.net/presenze/1990/1005/
