= 1981–82 AC Fiorentina season =

AC Fiorentina
1981-1982 season
- President: Ranieri Pontello
- Manager: Giancarlo De Sisti
- Stadium: Comunale
- Serie A: Runners-up (in UEFA Cup)
- Coppa Italia: Quarter-finals
- Top goalscorer: League: Francesco Graziani (9); All: Graziani (11)
Home colours	Away colours

During the 1981–1982 season AC Fiorentina competed in Serie A and Coppa Italia.

== Summary ==
During the summer of 1981 the club reinforced its core with several players: centre back defender Vierchowod, a then-unknown young Massaro and Pecci for the midfield, and striker Graziani also from Torino, the outcome was a squad challenging Juventus and its dynasty for the first time in a decade. However, franchise star midfielder Antognoni, was injured by the Genoa Goalkeeper Silvano Martina shrinking the chances for the trophy.

Manager Giancarlo De Sisti and the team after delivered a decent season arrived for the last round with 44 points in an exciting race tied in first place with Juventus. The squad lost the league title after a 0-0 draw in Cagliari finishing as Runners-up.

== Squad ==
Note: Flags indicate national team as defined under FIFA eligibility rules; some limited exceptions apply. Players may hold more than one non-FIFA nationality.

Pos.	Nation	Player
GK	ITA	Giovanni Galli
GK	ITA	Mario Paradisi
DF	ITA	Marco Baroni
DF	ITA	Renzo Contratto
DF	ITA	Antonello Cuccureddu
DF	ITA	Armando Ferroni
DF	ITA	Roberto Galbiati
DF	ITA	Luca Moz
DF	ITA	Pietro Vierchowod
DF	ITA	Francesco Casagrande

Pos.	Nation	Player
MF	ITA	Giancarlo Antognoni (Captain)
MF	ARG	Daniel Bertoni
MF	ITA	Luciano Miani
MF	ITA	Andrea Orlandini
MF	ITA	Eraldo Pecci
MF	ITA	Luigi Sacchetti
FW	ITA	Luca Bartolini
FW	ITA	Francesco Graziani
FW	ITA	Daniele Massaro
FW	ITA	Paolo Monelli

=== Transfers ===
In
Pos.	Name	from	Type
FW	Francesco Graziani	Torino	-
MF	Eraldo Pecci	Torino	-
DF	Antonello Cuccureddu	Juventus	-
DF	Pietro Vierchowod	Como	-
FW	Daniele Massaro	AC Monza	-
GK	Mario Paradisi	Empoli	-

Out
Pos.	Name	To	Type
MF	Maurizio Restelli	Cagliari	
DF	Alessio Tendi	Como	-
DF	Giovanni Guerrini	Sampdoria	-
MF	Andrea Manzo	Sampdoria	-
FW	Sauro Fattori	Hellas Verona	-
FW	Claudio Desolati	Pistoiese	-
MF	Luciano Bruni	Pistoiese	-
DF	Gianfilippo Reali	SPAL	-
FW	Giuseppe Novellino		released

== Competitions ==
=== Serie A ===
==== League table ====
Pos	Team	Pld	W	D	L	GF	GA	GD	Pts	Qualification or relegation
1	Juventus (Note: Juventus became the first team in Italian football to be awarded two golden stars, to commemorate their 20th title win.) (C)	30	19	8	3	48	14	+34	46	Qualification to European Cup
2	Fiorentina	30	17	11	2	36	17	+19	45	Qualification to UEFA Cup
3	Roma	30	15	8	7	40	29	+11	38	Qualification to UEFA Cup
4	Napoli (Note: Napoli obtained a UEFA spot for the Albanian political renounce.)	30	10	15	5	31	21	+10	35	Qualification to UEFA Cup
5	Internazionale	30	11	13	6	39	34	+5	35	Qualification to Cup Winners' Cup

Source: RSSSF.com
Rules for classification: 1) points; 2) Head-to-head points; 3) goal difference; 4) number of goals scored.
(C) Champions

==== Results by round ====
Round	1	2	3	4	5	6	7	8	9	10	11	12	13	14	15	16	17	18	19	20	21	22	23	24	25	26	27	28	29	30	31
Ground	H	A	H	A	H	A	H	H	A	H	A	A	H	H	A	H	A	H	A	H	A	H	A	H	A	H	H	A	A	H	A
Result	W	D	P	W	W	L	D	W	L	W	D	W	W	W	W	D	D	W	D	W	W	W	D	W	D	D	W	W	D	W	D
Position	2	3	6	2	2	4	4	3	4	4	4	3	1	1	1	1	1	1	2	2	2	2	2	2	2	2	2	2	2	2	2

Source: Competitive matches
A = Away; H = Home; W = Win; D = Draw; L = Loss; P = Postponed; = Leader, 1982–83 European Cup; = 1982–83 UEFA Cup; = 1982-83 Serie B; R = 1982-83 UEFA Cup Winners' Cup

==== Matches ====
13 September 1981 1	Fiorentina	1 – 0	Como	Firenze
	Francesco Casagrande 67'			Stadium: Comunale; Referee: Paolo Milan

20 September 1981 2	AC Milan	0 – 0	Fiorentina	Milano
				Stadium: San Siro; Referee: Carlo Longhi

27 September 1981 3	Fiorentina	suspd.	Ascoli	Firenze
				Stadium: Comunale; Referee: Massimo Ciulli
Note: Match suspended at 6' due to field issues.

4 October 1981 4	Catanzaro	0 – 2	Fiorentina	Catanzaro
			78' Vierchowod; 79' D. Bertoni	Stadium: Stadio Militare; Referee: Maurizio Mattei

11 October 1981 5	Fiorentina	1 – 0	US Avellino	Firenze
	F. Graziani 1'			Stadium: Comunale; Referee: Egidio Ballerini

25 October 1981 6	AS Roma	2 – 0	Fiorentina	Roma
	Di Bartolomei 20'; Pruzzo 35'			Stadium: Olimpico; Referee: Pietro D'Elia

28 October 1981 3	Fiorentina	0 – 0	Ascoli	Firenze
	Antognoni (penalty missed) 87'			Stadium: Comunale; Referee: Vittorio Benedetti
Note: Match rescheduled from 27 september 1981.

1 November 1981 7	Fiorentina	2 – 1	Torino FC	Firenze
	Francesco Casagrande 33'; D. Bertoni 69'		90' Pulici	Stadium: Comunale; Referee: Claudio Pieri

8 November 1981 8	AC Cesena	2 – 1	Fiorentina	Cesena
	Verza 53'; Lucchi 66'		68' Antognoni	Stadium: La Fiorita; Referee: Luigi Agnolin

22 November 1981 9	Fiorentina	3 – 2	Genoa CFC	Firenze
	D. Bertoni 24'; Antognoni 52' (pen.); F. Graziani 71'		36' F. Gorin; 82' P. Iachini	Stadium: Comunale; Referee: Paolo Casarin (Milano)

29 November 1981 10	Juventus	0 – 0	Fiorentina	Torino
				Stadium: Comunale; Referee: Gianfranco Menegali

13 December 1981 11	Bologna FC	0 – 2	Fiorentina	Bologna
			1' Pecci; 68' Miani	Stadium: Comunale; Referee: Maurizio Mattei

20 December 1981 12	Fiorentina	2 – 1	SSC Napoli	Firenze
	F. Graziani 32'; D. Bertoni 76'		33' C. Pellegrini	Stadium: Comunale; Referee: Claudio Pieri (Genova)

3 January 1982 13	Fiorentina	4 – 2	Inter	Firenze
	D. Bertoni 25', 50' (pen.); F. Graziani 57'; Pecci 65'		48', 62' Aldo Serena	Stadium: Comunale; Referee: Gianfranco Menegali

10 January 1982 14	Udinese	1 – 2	Fiorentina	Udine
	Muraro 56'		17' D. Bertoni; 62' F. Graziani	Stadium: Friuli; Referee: Maurizio Mattei

17 January 1982 15	Fiorentina	1 – 1	Cagliari	Firenze
	Sacchetti 45'		62' Piras	Stadium: Comunale; Referee: Luigi Agnolin

24 January 1982 16	Como	1 – 1	Fiorentina	Como
	Nicoletti 78'		36' Vierchowod	Stadium: Giuseppe Sinigaglia; Referee: Enzo Barbaresco

31 January 1982 17	Fiorentina	1 – 0	AC Milan	Firenze
	Miani 25'			Stadium: Comunale; Referee: Pietro D'Elia

7 February 1982 18	Ascoli	0 – 0	Fiorentina	Ascoli Piceno
				Stadium: Cino e Lillo Del Duca; Referee: Rosario Lo Bello

14 February 1982 19	Fiorentina	1 – 0	US Catanzaro	Firenze
	F. Graziani 5'			Stadium: Comunale; Referee: Gianfranco Menegali

28 February 1982 20	US Avellino	1 – 2	Fiorentina	Avellino
	Facchini 85'		64' D. Bertoni; 77' Massaro	Stadium: Partenio; Referee: Enzo Barbaresco

7 March 1982 21	Fiorentina	1 – 0	AS Roma	Firenze
	Miani 36'			Stadium: Comunale; Referee: Paolo Casarin

14 March 1982 22	Torino	2 – 2	Fiorentina	Torino
	Ermini 68'; P. Pulici 87' (pen.)		48' F. Graziani; 77' (o.g.) P. Pulici	Stadium: Comunale; Referee: Luigi Agnolin

21 March 1982 23	Fiorentina	1 – 0	AC Cesena	Firenze
	Francesco Casagrande 80'			Stadium: Comunale; Referee: Pietro D'Elia

28 March 1982 24	Genoa CFC	0 – 0	Fiorentina	Genova
				Stadium: Luigi Ferraris; Referee: Maurizio Mattei

4 April 1982 25	Fiorentina	0 – 0	Juventus	Firenze
				Stadium: Comunale; Attendance: 60,000; Referee: Paolo Casarin

18 April 1982 26	Fiorentina	1 – 0	Bologna FC	Firenze
	F. Graziani 51'			Stadium: Comunale; Referee: Gino Menicucci

25 April 1982 27	SSC Napoli	0 – 1	Fiorentina	Napoli
			82' Antognoni	Stadium: San Paolo; Referee: Gianfranco Menegali

2 May 1982 28	Inter	1 – 1	Fiorentina	Milano
	A. Ferroni 21' (o.g.)		50' Miani	Stadium: Giuseppe Meazza; Referee: Luigi Agnolin

9 May 1982 29	Fiorentina	3 – 0	Udinese	Firenze
	D. Bertoni 52'; F. Graziani 29'; Pancheri 84' (o.g.)			Stadium: Comunale; Referee: Vittorio Benedetti

16 May 1982 30	Cagliari	0 – 0	Fiorentina	Cagliari
				Stadium: Sant'Elia; Attendance: 55,000; Referee: Maurizio Mattei

=== Coppa Italia ===
==== Group phase ====
23 August 1981 1	Brescia	0 – 1	Fiorentina	Brescia
			13' Antognoni	Stadium: Mario Rigamonti; Referee: Luigi Agnolin

26 August 1981 2	Genoa	1 – 0	Fiorentina	Genova
	Russo 28'			Stadium: Luigi Ferraris; Referee: Gianfranco Menegali

2 September 1981 4	Fiorentina	2 – 0	Varese	Firenze
	Antognoni 9'; Casagrande 62'			Stadium: Comunale; Referee: Angelo Angelelli

6 September 1981 5	Fiorentina	4 – 0	Foggia	Firenze
	Laveneziana 15' (o.g.); F. Graziani 71', 89'; D. Bertoni 73'			Stadium: Comunale; Referee: Rosario Lo Bello

==== Quarterfinals ====
18 November 1981 1	Torino	0 – 0	Fiorentina	Torino
				Stadium: Comunale; Referee: Romeo Paparesta

8 December 1981 2	Fiorentina	1 – 1	Torino	Firenze
	Massaro 12'		31' P. Mariani	Stadium: Comunale; Referee: Angelo Angelelli
Note: Torino advanced to the semifinals stage on away goals.

== Statistics ==
=== Players statistics ===
No.	Pos	Nat	Player	Total		Serie A		Coppa	
No.	Pos	Nat	Player	Apps	Goals	Apps	Goals	Apps	Goals
	GK	(Italy) ITA	Giovanni Galli	36	-19	30	-17	6	-2
	DF	(Italy) ITA	Renzo Contratto	34	0	28	0	6	0
	DF	(Italy) ITA	Roberto Galbiati	35	0	29	0	6	0
	DF	(Italy) ITA	Pietro Vierchowod	34	2	28	2	6	0
	DF	(Italy) ITA	Armando Ferroni	31	0	19+8	0	4	0
	MF	(Argentina) ARG	Daniel Bertoni	36	10	30	9	6	1
	MF	(Italy) ITA	Eraldo Pecci	31	2	25	2	6	0
	MF	(Italy) ITA	Francesco Casagrande	31	4	24+2	3	5	1
	MF	(Italy) ITA	Luciano Miani	23	4	22	4	1	0
	FW	(Italy) ITA	Francesco Graziani	33	11	29	9	4	2
	FW	(Italy) ITA	Daniele Massaro	35	2	29	1	6	1
	GK	(Italy) ITA	Mario Paradisi	1	0	0+1	0	0	0
	MF	(Italy) ITA	Giancarlo Antognoni	21	5	16	3	5	2
	DF	(Italy) ITA	Antonello Cuccureddu	14	0	10+1	0	3	0
	MF	(Italy) ITA	Luigi Sacchetti	28	1	9+13	1	6	0
	FW	(Italy) ITA	Paolo Monelli	14	0	2+11	0	1	0
	MF	(Italy) ITA	Andrea Orlandini	5	0	0+4	0	1	0
	FW	(Italy) ITA	Luca Bartolini	4	0	0+2	0	2	0
	DF	(Italy) ITA	Luca Moz	0	0	0	0		
	DF	(Italy) ITA	Marco Baroni						

- Source: http://calcio-seriea.net/presenze/1981/852/
