= Premio Nazionale Carriera Esemplare "Gaetano Scirea" =

"Gaetano Scirea" Exemplary Career National Award
- Sport: Association football
- Awarded for: A football personality for their fair play and sportsmanship
- Local name: Premio Nazionale Carriera Esemplare "Gaetano Scirea" (Italian)
- Country: Italy
- Presented by: Italian Sports Press Association; Comune of Cinisello Balsamo

History
- First award: 1992
- Editions: 29
- First winner: (Italy) Giuseppe Baresi
- Most recent: (Denmark) Simon Kjær

The Premio Nazionale Carriera Esemplare "Gaetano Scirea" (""Gaetano Scirea" Exemplary Career National Award") is a recognition dedicated to footballers over the age of 30 playing in Italy's Serie A. Established in 1992, the prize is awarded annually for their playing ability and sportsmanship by the Unione Stampa Sportiva Italiana (Italian Sports Press Association) or USSI.

== History and regulations ==
The recognition was created in honour of Italian defender Gaetano Scirea, who died in a car crash on 3 September 1989. The prize is awarded annually to Serie A Italian footballer over the age of 30 who has stood out throughout their career both for their playing ability and sportsmanship. All Italian journalists are called to vote one recipient from a shortlist of selected candidates.

== Winners ==
| Year | Winner | Club | Ref(s) |
|---|---|---|---|
| 1992 | (Italy) Giuseppe Baresi | Internazionale | |
| 1993 | (Italy) Stefano Tacconi | Genoa | |
| 1994 | (Italy) Franco Baresi | Milan | |
| 1995 | (Italy) Pietro Vierchowod | Sampdoria | |
| 1996 | (Italy) Mauro Tassotti | Milan | |
| 1997 | (Italy) Giuseppe Bergomi | Internazionale | |
| 1998 | (Italy) Roberto Donadoni | Milan | |
| 1999 | (Italy) Michelangelo Rampulla | Juventus | |
| 2000 | (Italy) Alessandro Costacurta | Milan | |
| 2001 | (Italy) Roberto Baggio | Brescia | |
| 2002 | (Italy) Paolo Maldini | Milan | |
| 2003 | (Italy) Ciro Ferrara | Juventus | |
| 2004 | (Italy) Giuseppe Signori | Bologna | |
| 2005 | (Italy) Gianfranco Zola | Cagliari | |
| 2006 | (Italy) Gianluca Pessotto | Juventus | |
| 2007 | (Italy) Filippo Inzaghi | Milan | |
| 2008 | (Italy) Alessandro Del Piero | Juventus | |
| 2009 | (Italy) Cristiano Doni | Atalanta | |
| 2010 | (Argentina) Javier Zanetti | Internazionale | |
| 2011 | (Italy) Antonio Di Natale | Udinese | |
| 2012 | (Italy) Gennaro Gattuso | Milan | |
| 2013 (Note: In 2013, a special edition of the award was also posthumously awarded to former Italian footballer Stefano Borgonovo, who had passed away in June earlier that year, after he had been struggling with ALS for several years.) | (Italy) Andrea Pirlo | Juventus | |
| 2014 | (Italy) Francesco Totti | Roma | |
| 2015 | (Italy) Luca Toni | Hellas Verona | |
| 2016 | (Italy) Gianluigi Buffon | Juventus | |
| 2017 | (Italy) Andrea Barzagli | Juventus | |
| 2018 | (Italy) Fabio Quagliarella | Sampdoria | |
| 2019 | (Italy) Giorgio Chiellini | Juventus | |
| 2020 | (Italy) Andrea Belotti | Torino | |
| 2021 | (Denmark) Simon Kjær | Milan | |
| 2022 | (Italy) Federico Gatti | Juventus | |

== See also ==
- Premio internazionale Giacinto Facchetti
