= Fabrizio Maiello =

Italian footballer and criminal

Fabrizio Maiello is an Italian former footballer and criminal.

== Early life ==
Maiello was born and raised in Limbiate, Italy.

== Career ==
As a youth player, Maiello joined the youth academy of Serie A side AC Milan. After that, he joined the youth academy of Monza in the Italian lower leagues. However, he suffered a knee injury there which ended his football career. After that, he became a criminal, and was first arrested at the age of 18.

After that, he was sent to an asylum, where he helped young Italians and became known for setting records, such as a five kilometer seal dribble and one kilometer of keepie uppies while walking backwards, before becoming a gardener. He also attempted to kidnap Gianfranco Zola in 1994.

== Personal life ==
Maiello is a Christian.
