= Premio internazionale Giacinto Facchetti =

"Giacinto Facchetti" International Award
- Sport: Association football
- Awarded for: A football personality for their fair play and sportsmanship
- Local name: Premio internazionale Giacinto Facchetti – Il bello del calcio (Italian)
- Country: Italy
- Presented by: La Gazzetta dello Sport

History
- First award: 2006
- Editions: 14
- First winner: (Paraguay) Julio Valentín González
- Most recent: (Belgium) Romelu Lukaku

The Premio internazionale Giacinto Facchetti – Il bello del calcio ("Giacinto Facchetti International Award – The beauty of football") is a recognition established in 2006 awarded annually to a football personality for their fair play and sportsmanship by the Milan-based Italian sports newspaper La Gazzetta dello Sport.

== History ==
The prize was conceived in 2006 by the newspaper's former director Candido Cannavò and the newspaper's director at the time Carlo Verdelli, in honour of the late Italy and Internazionale defender Giacinto Facchetti, following his death earlier that year on 4 September. The distinction is awarded annually to a football personality who has stood out for their fair play and sportsmanship.

== Winners ==
Year	Winner	Ref(s)
2006	(Paraguay) Julio Valentín González	
2007	(Iraq) Younis Mahmoud	
2008	(Italy) Paolo Maldini	
2009	(Italy) Cesare Prandelli	
2010	(Italy) Gianfranco Zola	
2011	(France) Michel Platini	
2012	(Argentina) Javier Zanetti	
2013	(France) Eric Abidal	
2014	(Italy) Francesco Totti	
2015	(Italy) Roberto Donadoni	
2016	(Italy) Giancarlo Antognoni	
2018	(Italy) Andrea Pirlo	
2019	(Italy) Gianluca Vialli	
2020	(Belgium) Romelu Lukaku	

== See also ==
- Premio Nazionale Carriera Esemplare "Gaetano Scirea"
