= Gianfranco Zola =

Italian football manager (born 1966)

Gianfranco Zola OMRI, OBE
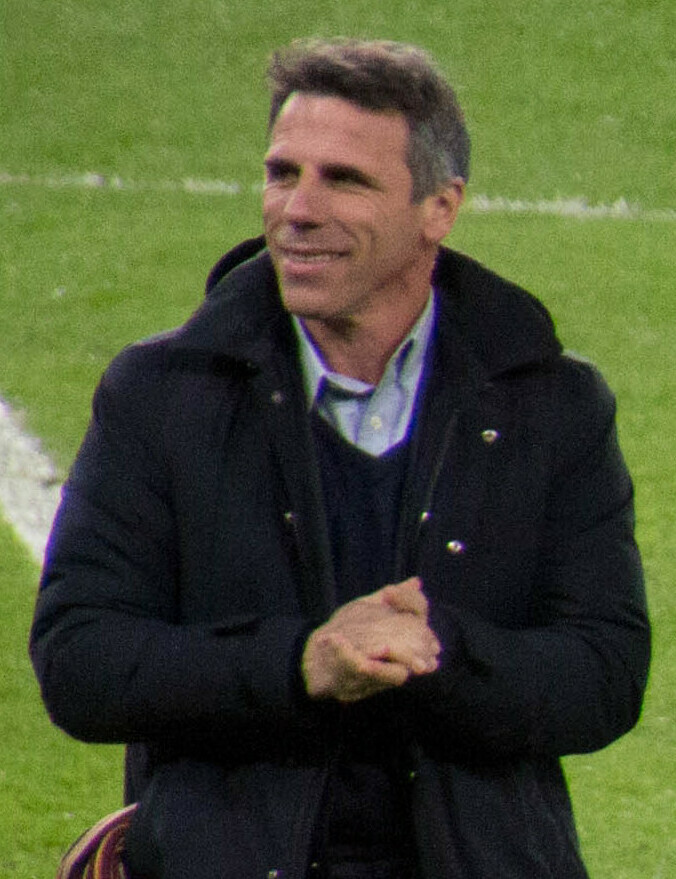
- Zola in 2018

Personal information
- Full name: Gianfranco Zola
- Date of birth: 5 July 1966 (age 60)
- Place of birth: Oliena, Italy
- Height: 1.68 m (5 ft 6 in)
- Positions: Forward; attacking midfielder

Youth career
- 1980–1983: Corrasi Oliena

Senior career*
Years	Team	Apps	(Gls)
1984–1986	Nuorese	31	(10)
1986–1989	Torres	88	(21)
1989–1993	Napoli	105	(32)
1993–1996	Parma	102	(49)
1996–2003	Chelsea	229	(59)
2003–2005	Cagliari	74	(22)
Total		629	(193)

International career
1991–1997	Italy	35	(10)
1990–1997	Sardinia	2	(1)

Managerial career
- 2008–2010: West Ham United
- 2011–2012: Italy U16
- 2012–2013: Watford
- 2014–2015: Cagliari
- 2015–2016: Al-Arabi
- 2016–2017: Birmingham City
Medal record
Men's football
Representing Italy
FIFA World Cup
Runner-up	1994
- * Club domestic league appearances and goals

Gianfranco Zola OMRI OBE (Italian pronunciation: [dʒaɱˈfraŋko dˈdzɔːla]; born 5 July 1966) is an Italian football executive, manager, and former footballer who played predominantly as a forward. He is currently vice-president of the Lega Pro, the Italian Serie C football league.

He spent the first decade of his playing career in Italy, most notably with Napoli alongside Diego Maradona and Careca where he won the 1989–90 Serie A title, and at Parma where he won the Italian Super Cup and the 1994–95 UEFA Cup. He later moved to English side Chelsea, where he was voted the Football Writers' Player of the Year in the 1996–97 season. During his time at the club, he won the 1997–98 UEFA Cup Winners' Cup, the UEFA Super Cup, two FA Cups, the League Cup, and the Community Shield. In 2003 he was voted the greatest Chelsea player ever. He was capped 35 times for Italy from his debut in 1991, appearing at the 1994 World Cup, where Italy finished in second place, and Euro 1996.

After a stint with Italy under-21s, Zola began his club managerial career with West Ham United of the Premier League in 2008, before being sacked in 2010. He was manager of Watford from July 2012 until he announced his resignation on 16 December 2013. From December 2014 to March 2015 he managed Cagliari in Serie A. He returned to Chelsea as the assistant of new manager Maurizio Sarri on 18 July 2018, ahead of the 2018–19 Premier League season.

== Club career ==
=== Early career ===
Born in Oliena, Zola signed his first professional contract with Sardinian team Nuorese in 1984. In 1986, he moved to the Sassari-based team Torres, where he spent three seasons.

=== Napoli ===
He was noticed by Luciano Moggi in Serie C1 in 1989, he signed for Napoli in Serie A for ₤2 million, making his debut that year. The young and talented Zola scored two goals as understudy to Diego Maradona as Napoli won the Serie A title in 1990, the only league title of Zola's career. Zola scored his first goal against Atalanta, whilst his second goal was scored against Genoa, during injury time, which allowed Napoli to win 2–1 and maintain a two-point lead over Milan, who were Napoli's main title contenders, in second place. Zola was excited by the transfer, and he developed an important friendship with Maradona, who commented "Finally they have bought someone shorter than me!" Maradona would prove to be a big influence on Zola's career. The two would spend hours practising free kicks together after training and Zola later said that "I learned everything from Diego. I used to spy on him every time he trained and learned how to curl a free-kick just like him." After Maradona's disqualification due to drug ban, Gianfranco Zola was considered to be the "new Maradona" and his heir at Napoli during the early 1990s.

Zola helped Napoli to win the Italian Super Cup in 1990, partnering alongside Careca following Maradona's drug ban during the second part of the 1990–91 season, as Napoli finished in a disappointing seventh place. Due to his individual performances, however, Zola was given his debut for the Italy national team under coach Arrigo Sacchi in 1991, winning his first cap against Norway in November. He temporarily inherited Maradona's number 10 shirt the following season under manager Claudio Ranieri, after Maradona parted ways with the club due to his ban, scoring 12 goals in 34 appearances. Upon his departure, Maradona had recommended that the Napoli management focus on Zola's development, stating: "Napoli doesn't need to look for anyone to replace me, the team already has Zola!". In his final season with the club, he managed 12 goals in 33 league appearances, and he also finished the 1992–93 Serie A season as the joint top assist provider in the league, with 12 assists, alongside Francesco Baiano. During his time in Napoli, Zola scored a total of 32 goals in 105 appearances.

=== Parma ===
In 1993, Zola left Napoli and joined fellow Serie A side Parma for ₤13 million, due to the poor economic situation of the Neapolitan club. He was initially accused of betraying the club by the fans, although Zola denied this, noting that Corrado Ferlaino had also been forced to sell other important Napoli players such as Jonas Thern, Ciro Ferrara and Daniel Fonseca, in order to overcome the club's debts. With Parma, he established himself as one of the league's top players, and he achieved notable domestic and European success; he came close to winning another Serie A title, in particular during the 1994–95 season, in which he scored 19 goals in a close fought title-race with rivals Juventus, although he ultimately failed to do so. In his first season, he scored 18 league goals, and with the club, he won the UEFA Super Cup in 1993, and the UEFA Cup in 1995 with Parma, and he also reached the final of the UEFA Cup Winners' Cup in 1994, as well as the finals of the Italian Cup and the Italian Super Cup in 1995. It was with the blue and yellow club that he cemented his reputation as one of the best and most talented creative players in Italy, along with Roberto Baggio and Alessandro Del Piero.

During the 1995–96 season, Zola initially experienced competition in the team with Bulgarian forward Hristo Stoichkov, who played the same tactical role as Zola; as a result, Zola would begin to be deployed in the starting eleven with less frequency, losing his place in the squad, despite scoring 10 league goals. During the following season, manager Carlo Ancelotti came to see Zola as a "square peg" unable to fit into his rigid 4–4–2 system upon his arrival at the club in 1996. Zola was played out of position in a left midfield role, scoring only 2 goals, as Ancelotti preferred to play Hernán Crespo and Enrico Chiesa up-front. Zola became frustrated of playing in this role and ultimately made himself available for a transfer, moving to Premier League side Chelsea in November 1996. In total, Zola made 102 league appearances with Parma, scoring 49 goals.

=== Chelsea ===
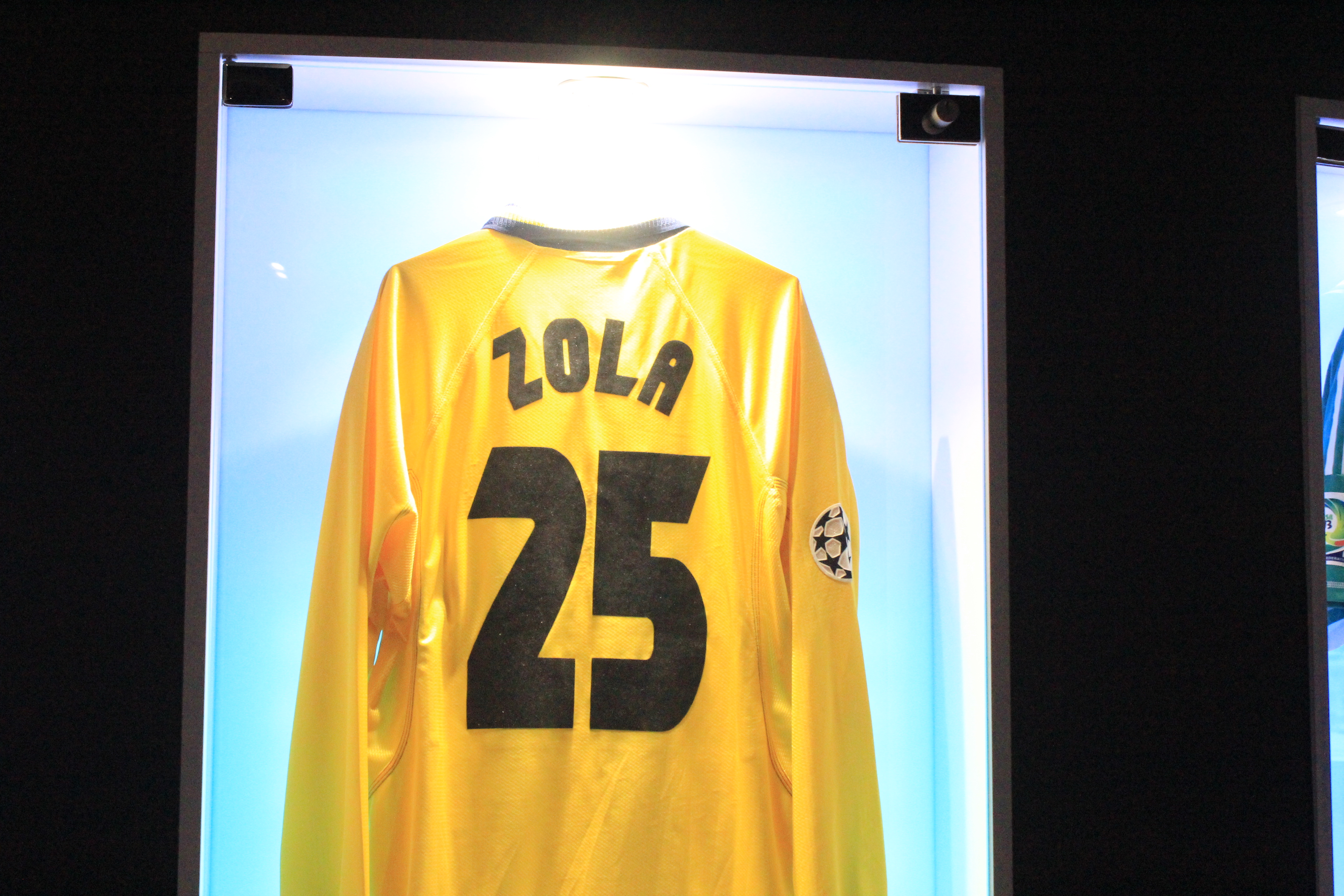
Zola's No. 25 Chelsea shirt, on display at the club museum

In November 1996, Zola joined Chelsea for £4.5 million as one of several continental players signed by Ruud Gullit (including compatriot Gianluca Vialli) and was assigned the number 25 jersey. He made his debut in a 1–1 draw with Blackburn Rovers at Ewood Park. In his debut season he demonstrated his skill and talent, and put in several notable performances, scoring a series of memorable goals. In February 1997, after spiriting the ball around Manchester United's defence in the penalty area before slotting the ball past goalkeeper Peter Schmeichel, he was described by United manager Alex Ferguson as a "clever little so-and-so".

He was a key player in Chelsea's resurgence in the 1996–97 season, helping them win the FA Cup with a 2–0 win over Middlesbrough at Wembley Stadium having scored four goals en route to the final, including a 25-yard curling shot against Liverpool as Chelsea came from 0–2 behind to win 4–2, and a memorable goal of individual skill in the semi-final against Wimbledon, backheeling the ball and turning 180 degrees before slotting the ball into the net. At the end of the season he was voted FWA Player of the Year, the only player ever to win the accolade without playing a full season in the English league and the first Chelsea player to win it.

In the 1997–98 season, Zola helped Chelsea win three more trophies, the League Cup, the Cup Winners' Cup and the Super Cup. An injury denied him a place in the starting line-up for the Cup Winners' Cup final against Stuttgart at the Råsunda Stadium in Stockholm, but he still played an important part in Chelsea's victory, as he came on as a second-half substitute and scored the winning goal after barely 30 seconds. With only his second touch of the game, he struck a through ball from Dennis Wise into the roof of the net to secure Chelsea's third major trophy in a year and the second European trophy in the club's history. In the same season, Zola hit his first professional hat-trick, in a 4–0 victory over Derby County at Stamford Bridge in November 1997.

"Gianfranco tries everything because he is a wizard and the wizard must try."
— Claudio Ranieri reflecting on Zola's back-heeled goal against Norwich in 2002.

When Chelsea made their first appearance in the Champions League in 1999–2000, Zola was a key player throughout the campaign, although he found his chances in the Premier League more limited, owing to manager Gianluca Vialli's squad rotation policy. Zola scored three goals in Chelsea's run to the Champions League quarter-finals, including a curling free kick against Barcelona, and he again won the FA Cup with the club, with his free-kick in the final against Aston Villa setting up Roberto Di Matteo's winner. His later years with Chelsea saw his appearances restricted by the new strike pairing of Jimmy Floyd Hasselbaink and Eiður Guðjohnsen. During the 2000–01 Premier League season, Zola managed 9 league goals.

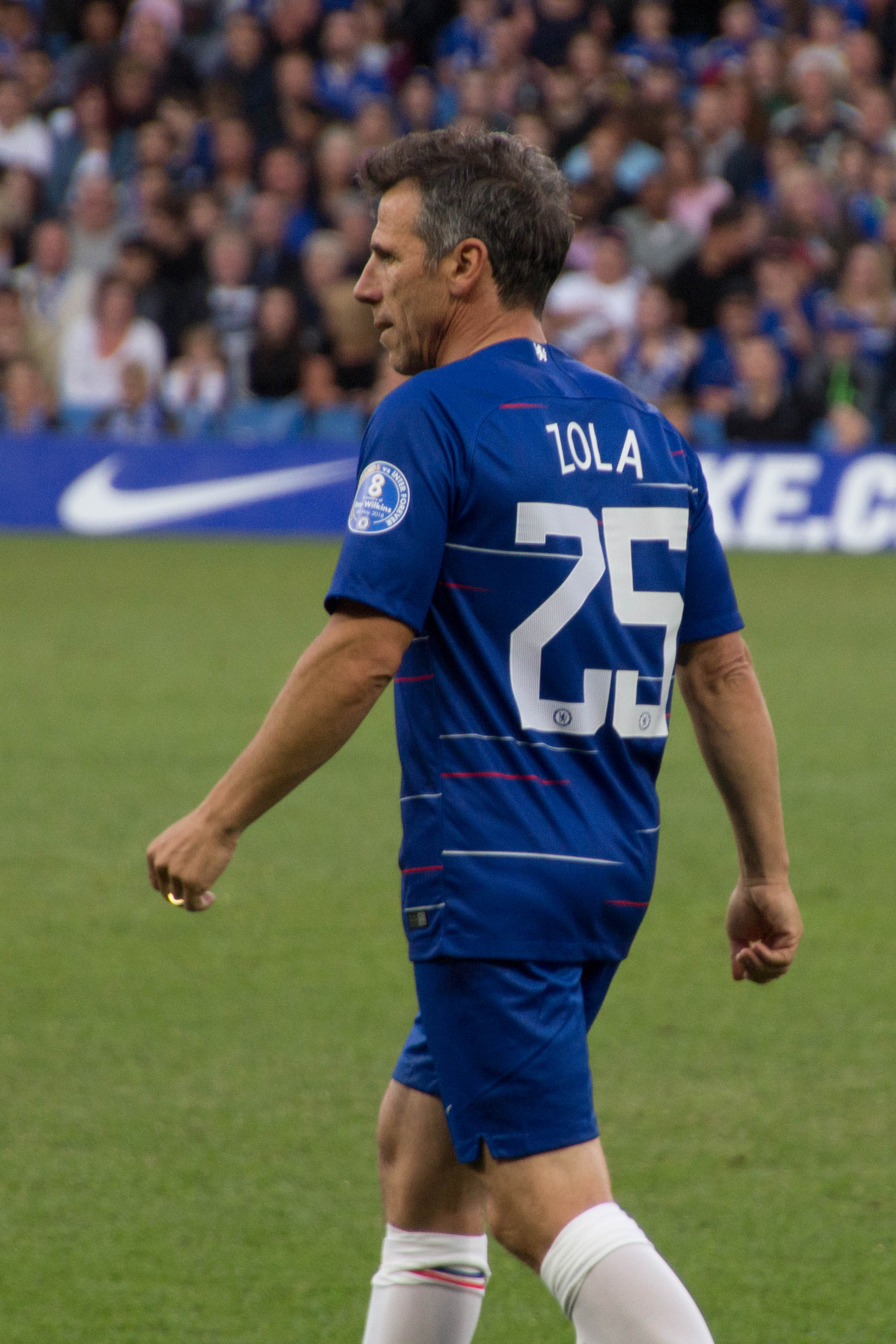
Zola in 2018, playing for Chelsea Legends.

In the 2001–02 season, Zola's starting chances became limited, after a summer when Claudio Ranieri showed the door to many of Chelsea's ageing stars such as club captain Dennis Wise, goalscoring midfielder Gustavo Poyet and French defender Frank Leboeuf, scoring only 3 goals. Zola was limited to infrequent starts and many substitute appearances due to Ranieri's new policy of decreasing the average age of the Chelsea squad, preferring to play the Icelandic youngster Gudjohnsen with Hasselbaink. Zola did draw attention, however, for his dominant performance when he scored with a notable backheeled effort in mid-air from a corner-kick, in an FA Cup tie against Norwich City on 16 January 2002. Manager Claudio Ranieri described the goal as "fantasy, magic".

In 2002–03, his final season with Chelsea, he enjoyed a renaissance, scoring 16 goals, his highest seasonal tally for Chelsea, and was voted the club's player of the year after helping Chelsea qualify for the Champions League. Zola scored his final goal for Chelsea, a lob from outside the penalty area against Everton, on Easter Monday 2003. He made his final competitive appearance for the club on the final day of the season with a 20-minute cameo against Liverpool, beating four Liverpool players with a dribble late on in the match, gaining applause from both sets of fans in one of the final moments of his career. He played in a total of 312 games for Chelsea and scored 80 goals, scoring 59 goals in 229 Premier League appearances. He subsequently decided to return to Italy during the following season.

Zola was voted as the best ever Chelsea player by Chelsea's fans in early 2003. In November 2004, he was awarded an OBE, Honorary Member of the Order of the British Empire in a special ceremony in Rome. In 2005, Zola was voted into the Chelsea F.C. Centenary Eleven, occupying one of the two forward roles. No Chelsea player held Zola's number 25 shirt since his departure in 2003 until the number was given to Moisés Caicedo 20 years later in 2023 after he contacted Zola for permission to wear the shirt. Zola was also voted by The Sun one of the top ten best foreign "artistic" players in Premier League history in 2007, coming in second place behind George Best.

=== Cagliari ===
In the summer of 2003, amid rumours of an impending takeover at Chelsea, Zola left Stamford Bridge to join Cagliari, from his native Sardinia. Within a week Chelsea was acquired by Russian billionaire Roman Abramovich.

It was reported that Abramovich tried to buy the entire Cagliari club when Zola refused to renege on his verbal contract with Cagliari, although Zola himself will not confirm it. Zola subsequently led Cagliari to promotion to the Italian Serie A, then renewed his contract for one more year. He retired in June 2005, after ending his career in appropriate style with a double against Juventus in his last professional game. His number 10 Cagliari jersey was withdrawn in his honour for the season after he left but was worn in the 2006–07 season by Andrea Capone. Zola retired as the fifth highest goalscorer of free-kicks in Serie A history, with 20 goals from set-pieces, and currently sits behind only Francesco Totti and Roberto Baggio (both at 21), Alessandro Del Piero (22), Andrea Pirlo (26) and Siniša Mihajlović (28). With 12 goals from free kicks, he is also the joint–third all-time goalscorer from set-pieces in the history of the Premier League, alongside Thierry Henry and Cristiano Ronaldo, and behind only James Ward-Prowse (17) and David Beckham.

== International career ==
Zola made his debut for Italy aged 25 on 13 November 1991 in Genoa, under manager Arrigo Sacchi, in a Euro 1992 qualifier against Norway which ended 1–1. He appeared at the 1994 World Cup in the United States, making one substitute appearance on his 28th birthday in the second round knock-out match against Nigeria in Boston, with Italy trailing 1–0. After only twelve minutes on the field, Zola was controversially sent off, after being judged by the referee to have fouled Augustine Eguavoen. Although Italy managed to win the match 2–1 in extra-time and reach the World Cup final, Zola did not regain his place in the side after this suspension. His first two goals came on 25 March 1995, in a 4–1 win against Estonia in Salerno in a Euro 1996 qualifier.

Zola was called up for Euro 1996, and he played in all three group games at the tournament. He set up Pierluigi Casiraghi's second goal in the team's 2–1 win in the opening group match against Russia, but in the team's final group match, he notably missed a potential match-winning penalty in a 0–0 draw against eventual champions Germany as Italy surprisingly crashed out in the first round. He scored the only goal of the game in an historic 1–0 victory over England in a 1998 World Cup qualifying match at Wembley, on 12 February 1997. He won his final cap for Italy in the return fixture against England in Rome on 11 October 1997, which ended in a draw. He retired from international play after he was not called up for the 1998 World Cup by manager Cesare Maldini, who had selected Del Piero and Roberto Baggio in his role. Zola finished his international career with a total of 35 caps and ten goals.

As a Sardinian he could also be eligible for the Sardinian national football team, who represented the island on several occasions in Non-FIFA football. Indeed, he played in the first ever official documented appearance of the formation in 1990. The England national football team was in Sardinia for a training camp in order to prepare the 1990 FIFA World Cup in Italy, where, among other things, it would have played two of the three matches of the group stage in Cagliari. Therefore, it had been set up a XI formed by the best Sardinian players caught between Serie C and Amateurs to face the Lions in their first friendly match. Zola, at that time a player for S.S.C. Napoli, was the only professional player and the most representative one of the squad. The Three Lions won with a 10–1 score. 7 years later he was called for the second match against Corsica. For this match, all professional players were called (Zola was in Parma A.C.) and the Sardinians won 1–0 with a winning goal by Zola.

== Other work after retirement ==
In his playing career, Zola played 628 games and scored 193 goals in league play. Despite speculation he would play on in the 2005–06 season, Zola decided to leave the game just a week before he turned 39, and took a job as an Italian football pundit. Rumours were circulating within Australia that Zola was being chased by several A-League clubs, including Sydney, Melbourne Victory and Perth Glory, about a possible comeback, but Zola quashed such rumours. He did, however, play a charity match in Sydney in December 2006, appearing in both Marconi Stallions and APIA colours. Zola also played against Shrewsbury Town in the first match at their New Meadow stadium for "A-line Allstars" on 14 July 2007 as part of a kit sponsorship deal between the club and boot manufacturer A-line, who made Zola's boots.

== Managerial career ==
=== Italy U21 ===
In 2006, Zola started his coaching career, being appointed as assistant manager to Italy U21 manager and Pierluigi Casiraghi by the Italian Football Federation. The duo led the azzurrini to the 2008 Olympics in Beijing, where they reached the quarter-finals before being defeated 3–2 by Belgium under-21s.

=== West Ham United ===
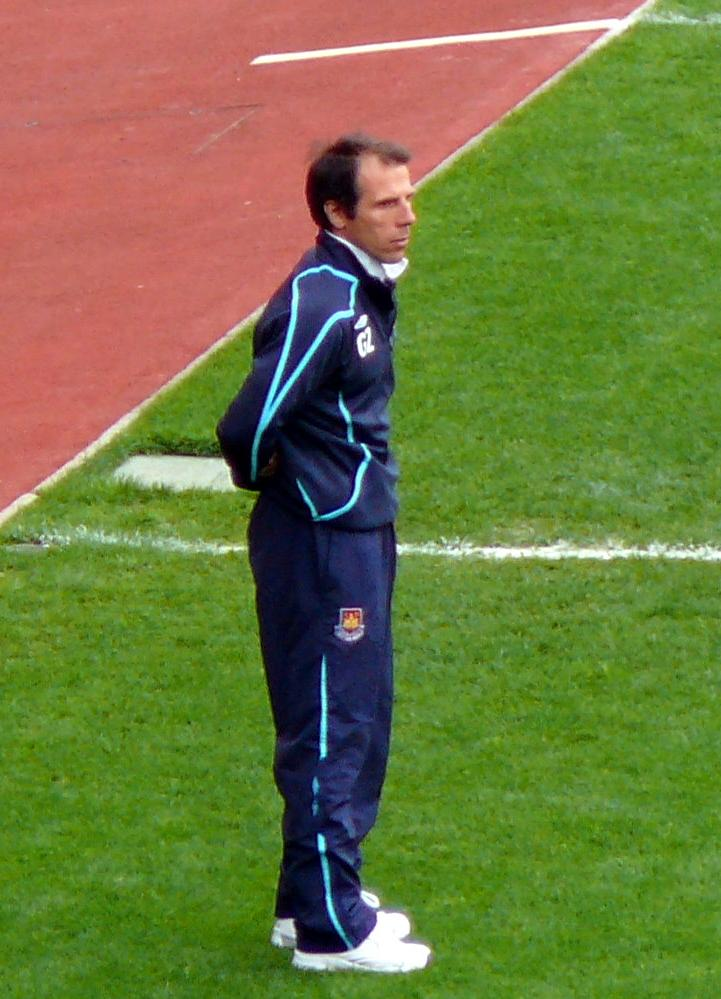
Zola as manager of West Ham United in 2009

On 7 September 2008, it was reported that Zola had been interviewed in Rome for the vacant manager's position at West Ham United and had "impressed the Club's representatives" at the interview. Two days later, he agreed a three-year contract to manage West Ham United, replacing Alan Curbishley, who resigned following differences with the board. He was unveiled as manager on 11 September, despite not having the required UEFA A managing licence. Zola, surprisingly for someone closely associated with West Ham's cross-town rivals Chelsea, quickly gained the backing of the fans. Nevertheless, he received applause from Chelsea fans whenever he returned to Stamford Bridge as West Ham manager. After a shaky start Zola began to develop a side with a flair not seen in a West Ham side for some years.

Zola also received praise for integrating more youth products into the first team. The likes of Junior Stanislas and Zavon Hines were given their debuts. The duo and first team youngsters Jack Collison and James Tomkins all scored their first goals for the club during his tenure. In April 2009, Zola signed a contract that could have kept him at Upton Park until 2013.

West Ham struggled in the 2009–10 season. Zola's position as manager was put in doubt when he revealed he had not been consulted over a bid for West Bromwich Albion player Graham Dorrans and by chairman David Sullivan's announcement that the entire squad was for sale except for midfielder Scott Parker. West Ham finished in 17th place, only five points above the relegation places. On 11 May 2010, two days after the end of the 2009–10 season, West Ham announced the termination of Zola's contract with immediate effect. Avram Grant was announced as his successor on 3 June 2010, and a week later it was announced that the club had reached a compensation settlement with Zola.

=== Watford ===
Zola was strongly linked with the managerial position at Watford in 2012, following the club's takeover by Udinese and Granada owner Giampaolo Pozzo. He was confirmed as Watford manager on 7 July, signing a two-year contract.

In his first season, Zola led Watford to 3rd place and a play-off position, which then saw them progress to the final at Wembley. There, they lost 1–0 to 5th place side Crystal Palace after extra-time. On 16 December 2013, Zola resigned as Watford manager. At the time of his resignation, Watford were 13th in the league, had not won since October 2013 and had lost their last five home games.

=== Cagliari ===
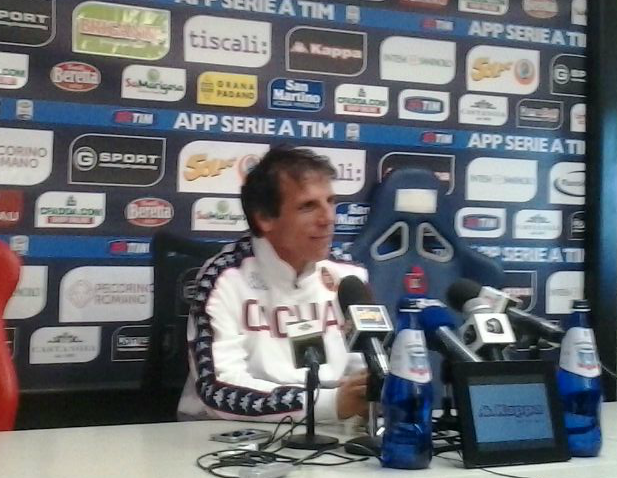
Zola as manager of Cagliari in 2015

On 24 December 2014, Zola was appointed as the new manager of Cagliari following Zdeněk Zeman's dismissal. In his first match in charge, on 6 January 2015, Cagliari lost 0–5 at Palermo with Daniele Conti being sent off in the first half, the result keeping the club in the relegation zone. Two days later he completed his first transfer as manager of the club, taking centre-back Alejandro González on loan from fellow Serie A club Hellas Verona. Zola won his first game on 11 January 2015, a 2–1 win over Cesena. After less than three months as Cagliari's manager, Zola was sacked on 9 March 2015, after being unable to escape the relegation zone after 10 matches; following his dismissal, Zeman was reinstated as Cagliari's manager.

=== Al-Arabi ===
On 11 July 2015, Zola was appointed coach of Qatar team Al-Arabi. After a poor first season in the Qatar Stars League, he was sacked, having achieved 10 wins from 26 games, losing 11, with the team placing 8th out of 14.

=== Birmingham City ===
On 14 December 2016, Zola was named manager of EFL Championship club Birmingham City, replacing Gary Rowett who had been sacked earlier that day. At the time, Birmingham sat 7th in the table, outside the playoff positions only on goal difference. Three days later, the team conceded a late goal to lose his first game in charge 2–1 at home to second-placed Brighton & Hove Albion. They did not win until Zola's 11th match in charge, a 1–0 win over Fulham on 4 February 2017. On 17 April, Zola resigned as manager following a 2–0 home defeat to Burton Albion which left the team just three points above the relegation zone with three matches remaining. They had won just twice during his 24-match tenure.

=== Chelsea ===
On 18 July 2018, Zola was appointed as assistant first-team coach to Maurizio Sarri at Chelsea. On 4 July 2019, after the arrival of Frank Lampard as head coach, Zola departed the club.

== Player profile ==
=== Style of play ===
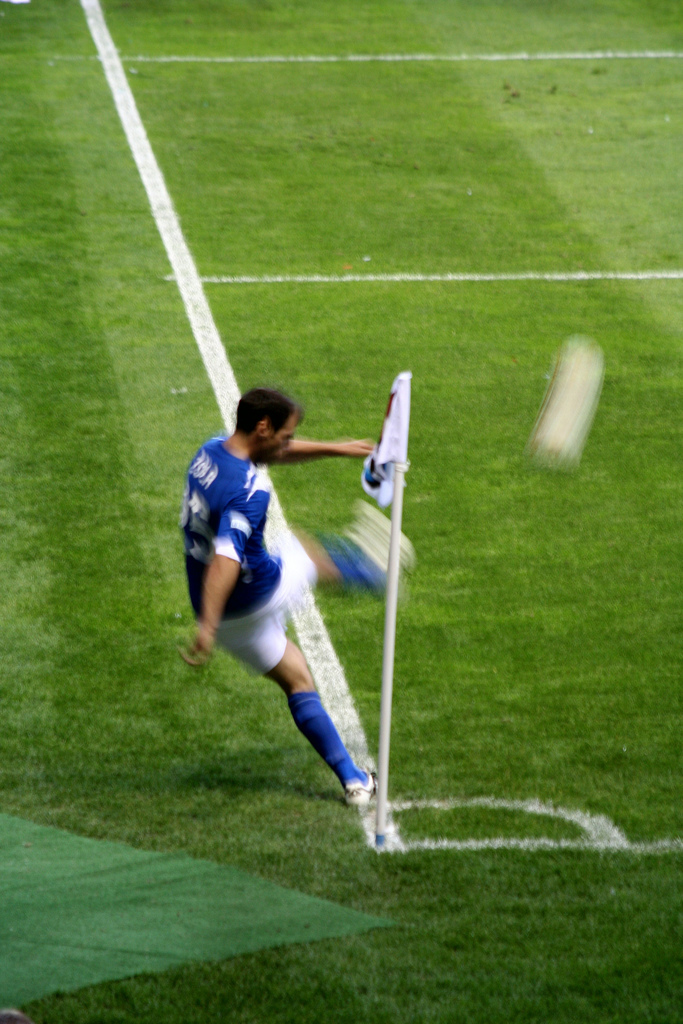
Zola swings in a corner kick for the Rest of the World XI at Soccer Aid 2006.

During his playing career, Zola was primarily used as a supporting striker or as a playmaking attacking midfielder, due to his ability to create chances and provide assists for teammates; he was also deployed as a winger (although this was not his favoured position, as he did not excel in this role) or even as a striker on occasion.

Zola was renowned for his ball control, his dribbling ability, vision, and passing ability with either foot, as well as his tactical intelligence, ability to read the game and eye for goal. According to his teammates, Zola's small stature and low centre of gravity gave him good balance and allowed him to be extremely quick and agile, which, along with his acceleration, speed, and ball skills, enabled him to change direction with the ball very quickly in tight spaces, and allowed him to beat defenders with feints in one on one situations.

Zola was also a penalty kick and set piece specialist, who was particularly renowned for his accuracy at bending direct free-kicks. In addition to his playing ability, Zola also stood out for his tenacity and work rate throughout his career, as well as his professionalism and fair–play. However, he was also known to be inconsistent on occasion, although he drew praise from managers and teammates for his ability to be decisive even when he was not at his best, and from pundits for his performances in big games. Due to his creativity, stature, and skill, Zola was given the nickname "Magic box" while playing at Chelsea.

=== Reception ===
Zola is regarded by several pundits, including Ben Hayward of FourFourTwo magazine, as one of the best Italian players of all time, as well as one of the best creative forwards of his generation, and is credited for paving the way for Italian players to play outside of the peninsula; in 2022, he was inducted into the Italian Football Hall of Fame. He is also considered one of the best players in both Chelsea's and the Premier League's history; in 2003, he was voted Chelsea's greatest player ever, while in 2006 he was inducted into the National Football Museum's English Football Hall of Fame. In 2017, Craig Burley of FourFourTwo magazine placed Zola at number 7 in his list of the "100 best foreign Premier League players ever." In 2013, Alex Richards of Bleacher Report placed Zola at number 12 in his list of the greatest dead ball specialists of all time. For his sportsmanship and playing ability, Zola was awarded the Premio Nazionale Carriera Esemplare "Gaetano Scirea" and the Pallone d'Argento in 2005 as well as the Premio internazionale Giacinto Facchetti in 2010.

== Personal life ==
Zola is a keen, competent amateur golfer, he is married to Franca, his childhood sweetheart and they have three children. Their eldest child, Andrea, played for non-league Grays Athletic F.C. as a full back, following his release from West Ham Football Academy. Their daughter, Martina, has successfully competed in amateur martial arts competitions.

Fabrizio Maiello, a former youth academy footballer, in Italy, (turned criminal) has claimed that he targeted Zola as a potential Kidnapping captive in 1994.

== Media ==
Zola features in EA Sports' FIFA video game series; he was named in the Ultimate Team Legends in FIFA 14.

Zola was the subject of a long-running urban legend where it was believed by some people that he appeared in the video for Bonnie Tyler's 1983 song "Total Eclipse of the Heart". In a 2012 interview, Zola confirmed that he did not appear in the video.

He has, however, appeared in a music video for the song "Zola" by Derry band Wonder Villains.

Zola once appeared in an episode of Renford Rejects, where he played a match for the Rejects against the Renford Razors and Martin Keown.

== Career statistics ==
=== Club ===
Appearances and goals by club, season and competition
Club	Season	League			National cup (Note: Includes Coppa Italia, FA Cup)		League cup (Note: Includes Football League Cup)		Continental		Other		Total	
Club	Season	Division	Apps	Goals	Apps	Goals	Apps	Goals	Apps	Goals	Apps	Goals	Apps	Goals
Nuorese	1984–85	Serie C2	4	0	—		—		—		—		4	0
Nuorese	1985–86	Serie D	27	10	—		—		—		—		27	10
Nuorese	Total		31	10	—		—		—		—		31	10
Sassari Torres	1986–87	Serie C2	30	8	—		—		—		—		30	8
Sassari Torres	1987–88	Serie C1	24	2	—		—		—		—		24	2
Sassari Torres	1988–89	Serie C1	34	11	—		—		—		—		34	11
Sassari Torres	Total		88	21	—		—		—		—		88	21
Napoli	1989–90	Serie A	18	2	6	1	—		2 (Note: Appearances in UEFA Cup)	0	—		26	3
Napoli	1990–91	Serie A	20	6	7	0	—		2 (Note: Appearances in European Cup)	0	0	0	29	6
Napoli	1991–92	Serie A	34	12	4	1	—		—		—		38	13
Napoli	1992–93	Serie A	33	12	6	2	—		4	0	—		43	14
Napoli	Total		105	32	23	4	—		8	0	0	0	136	36
Parma	1993–94	Serie A	33	18	7	3	—		9 (Note: Appearances in European Cup Winners' Cup)	1	2 (Note: Appearances in European Super Cup)	0	51	22
Parma	1994–95	Serie A	32	19	7	4	—		12	5	—		51	28
Parma	1995–96	Serie A	29	10	1	0	—		5	2	1 (Note: Appearance in Supercoppa Italiana)	0	36	12
Parma	1996–97	Serie A	8	2	1	0	—		2	0	—		11	2
Parma	Total		102	49	16	7	—		28	8	3	0	149	64
Chelsea	1996–97	Premier League	23	8	7	4	0	0	—		—		30	12
Chelsea	1997–98	Premier League	27	8	1	0	4	0	8	4	1 (Note: Appearance in FA Charity Shield)	0	41	12
Chelsea	1998–99	Premier League	37	13	6	1	0	0	5	1	1 (Note: Appearance in UEFA Super Cup)	0	49	15
Chelsea	1999–2000	Premier League	33	4	5	1	0	0	15 (Note: Appearances in UEFA Champions League)	3	—		53	8
Chelsea	2000–01	Premier League	36	9	3	2	1	1	2	0	1	0	43	12
Chelsea	2001–02	Premier League	35	3	6	1	5	0	4	1	—		50	5
Chelsea	2002–03	Premier League	38	14	3	2	3	0	2	0	—		46	16
Chelsea	Total		229	59	31	11	13	1	36	9	3	0	312	80
Cagliari	2003–04	Serie B	43	13	1	1	—		—		—		44	14
Cagliari	2004–05	Serie A	31	9	6	4	—		—		—		37	13
Cagliari	Total		74	22	7	5	—		—		—		81	27
Career total			629	193	77	38	13	1	72	17	6	0	797	238

=== International ===
Appearances and goals by national team and year
National team	Year	Apps	Goals
Italy	1991	2	0
Italy	1992	1	0
Italy	1993	1	0
Italy	1994	6	0
Italy	1995	8	7
Italy	1996	8	0
Italy	1997	9	3
Total		35	10

Scores and results list Italy's goal tally first, score column indicates score after each Zola goal.

List of international goals scored by Gianfranco Zola
No.	Date	Venue	Opponent	Score	Result	Competition
1	25 March 1995	Stadio Arechi, Salerno, Italy	Estonia	1–0	4–1	UEFA Euro 1996 qualifying
2	25 March 1995	Stadio Arechi, Salerno, Italy	Estonia	3–0	4–1	UEFA Euro 1996 qualifying
3	29 March 1995	Republikan Stadium, Kyiv, Ukraine	Ukraine	2–0	2–0	UEFA Euro 1996 qualifying
4	26 April 1995	Žalgiris Stadium, Vilnius, Lithuania	Lithuania	1–0	1–0	UEFA Euro 1996 qualifying
5	15 November 1995	Stadio Giglio, Reggio Emilia, Italy	Lithuania	2–0	4–0	UEFA Euro 1996 qualifying
6	15 November 1995	Stadio Giglio, Reggio Emilia, Italy	Lithuania	3–0	4–0	UEFA Euro 1996 qualifying
7	15 November 1995	Stadio Giglio, Reggio Emilia, Italy	Lithuania	4–0	4–0	UEFA Euro 1996 qualifying
8	22 January 1997	Stadio La Favorita, Palermo, Italy	Northern Ireland	1–0	2–0	Friendly
9	12 February 1997	Wembley Stadium, London, England	England	1–0	1–0	1998 FIFA World Cup qualification
10	29 March 1997	Stadio Nereo Rocco, Trieste, Italy	Moldova	2–0	3–0	1998 FIFA World Cup qualification

== Managerial statistics ==
Managerial record by team and tenure
Team	From	To	Record					Ref(s)
Team	From	To	P	W	D	L	Win %	Ref(s)
West Ham United	15 September 2008	11 May 2010	80	23	21	36	28.75	
Watford	8 July 2012	16 December 2013	75	33	15	27	44.00	
Cagliari	24 December 2014	9 March 2015	11	2	2	7	18.18	
Al-Arabi SC	11 July 2015	27 June 2016	26	10	5	11	38.46	
Birmingham City	14 December 2016	17 April 2017	24	2	8	14	8.33	
Total			216	70	51	95	32.41	

== Honours ==
=== Player ===
Torres

- Serie C2: 1986–87

Napoli

- Serie A: 1989–90

Parma

- UEFA Cup: 1994–95
- European Super Cup: 1993

Chelsea

- FA Cup: 1996–97, 1999–2000; runner-up: 2001–02
- Football League Cup: 1997–98
- FA Charity Shield: 2000
- UEFA Cup Winners' Cup: 1997–98
- UEFA Super Cup: 1998

Italy

- FIFA World Cup runner-up: 1994

Individual

- Serie A top-assist provider: 1992–93
- ESM Team of the Year: 1994–95
- Premier League Player of the Month: December 1996, October 2002
- FWA Footballer of the Year: 1997
- Chelsea Player of the Year: 1999, 2003
- Pallone d'Argento: 2004–05
- Chelsea Centenary XI: 2005
- Premio Nazionale Carriera Esemplare "Gaetano Scirea": 2005

=== Manager ===
Individual

- Football League Championship Manager of the Month: February 2013

=== Orders and special awards ===
- Officer of the Order of the British Empire: 2004
- English Football Hall of Fame: 2006
- Premio internazionale Giacinto Facchetti: 2010
- Italian Football Hall of Fame: 2022
