= Andrea Orlandini =

Italian footballer (born 1948)

Personal information
- Full name: Andrea Orlandini
- Date of birth: 6 February 1948 (age 78)
- Place of birth: Florence, Italy
- Position: Midfielder

Senior career*
Years	Team	Apps	(Gls)
1967–1973	Fiorentina	56	(3)
1968–1969	→ Reggiana (loan)	15	(0)
1969–1970	→ Sambenedettese (loan)	28	(5)
1970–1971	→ Prato (loan)	36	(8)
1973–1977	Napoli	111	(4)
1977–1982	Fiorentina	100	(1)

International career
1974–1975	Italy	3	(0)
- * Club domestic league appearances and goals

Andrea Orlandini (Italian pronunciation: [anˈdrɛːa orlanˈdiːni]; born 6 February 1948) is an Italian footballer who played as a midfielder.

== International career ==
He represented the Italy national football team three times, the first being on 20 November 1974, the occasion of a UEFA Euro 1976 qualifying match against the Netherlands in a 3–1 away loss.

== Honours ==
=== Player ===
Napoli

- Coppa Italia: 1975–76
