= Roberto Donadoni =

Italian footballer and manager

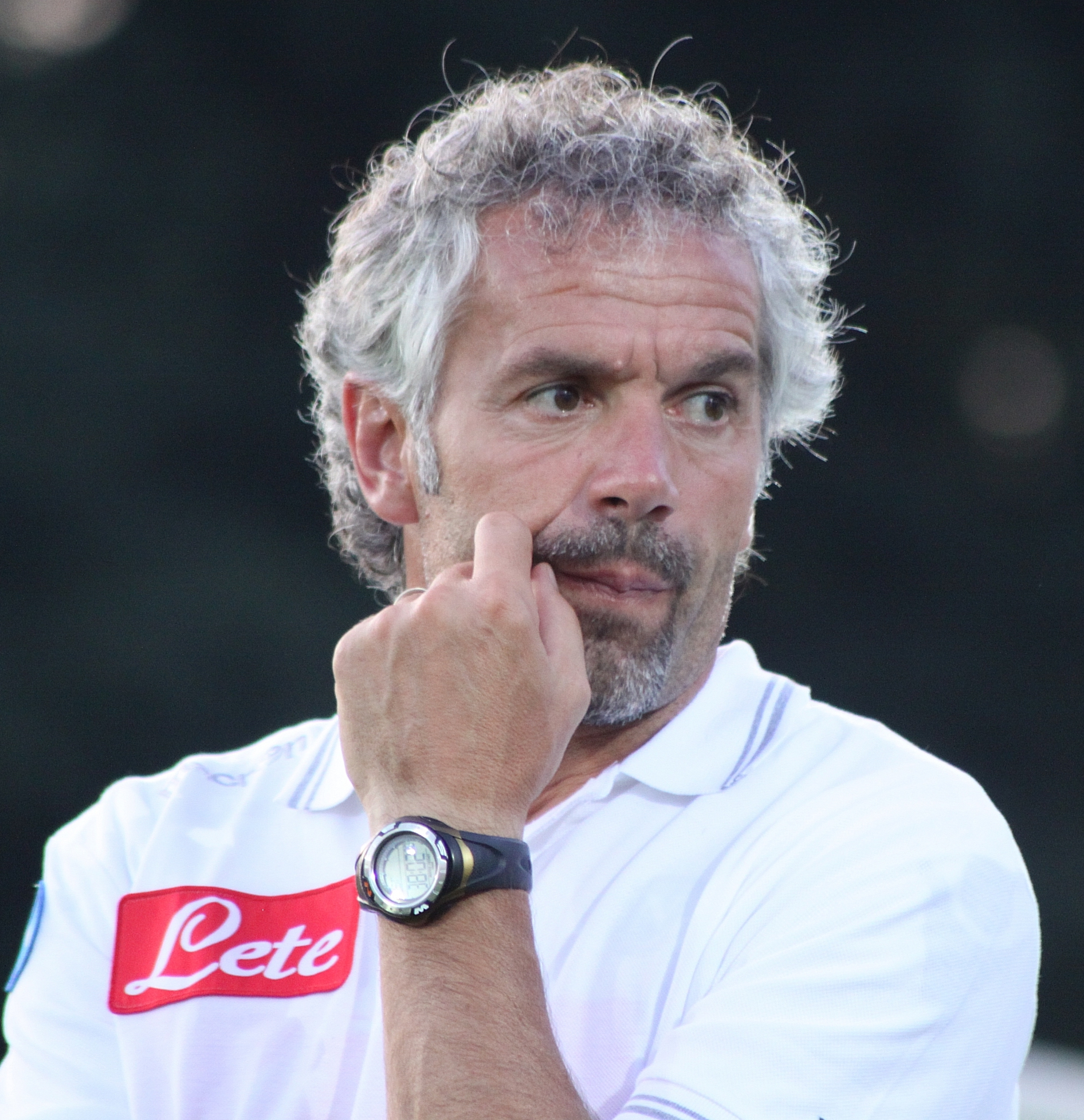
- Donadoni with Napoli in 2009

Personal information
- Full name: Roberto Donadoni
- Date of birth: 9 September 1963 (age 63)
- Place of birth: Cisano Bergamasco, Italy
- Height: 1.73 m (5 ft 8 in)
- Position: Midfielder

Youth career
- 1981–1982: Atalanta

Senior career*
Years	Team	Apps	(Gls)
1982–1986	Atalanta	96	(5)
1986–1996	AC Milan	261	(18)
1996–1997	MetroStars	49	(6)
1997–1999	AC Milan	24	(0)
1999–2000	Al-Ittihad	15	(0)
Total		445	(29)

International career
1984–1986	Italy U21	13	(1)
1986–1996	Italy	63	(5)

Managerial career
- 2001: Lecco
- 2002: Lecco
- 2002–2003: Livorno
- 2003: Genoa
- 2005–2006: Livorno
- 2006–2008: Italy
- 2009: Napoli
- 2010–2011: Cagliari
- 2012–2015: Parma
- 2015–2018: Bologna
- 2019–2020: Shenzhen
- 2025–2026: Spezia
Medal record
Men's football
Representing Italy
FIFA World Cup
Runner-up	1994
Third place	1990
- * Club domestic league appearances and goals

Roberto Donadoni Cavaliere OMRI (Italian pronunciation: [roˈbɛrto donaˈdoːni]; born 9 September 1963) is an Italian professional football manager and former player who played as a midfielder. He was most recently the head coach of Serie C Group B club Spezia.

A skilful and versatile winger, Donadoni was capable of playing on either flank, or in the centre. He began his career with Atalanta, and later he became a pillar of the powerhouse AC Milan team of the late 1980s and early 1990s, achieving domestic and international success during his time with the club. In his later career, he was also one of the pioneers of Major League Soccer, where he played two seasons for the MetroStars, before ending his career with Saudi Premier League side Al-Ittihad in 2000.

At international level, Donadoni was also an important member of the Italy national team throughout the late 1980s and early 1990s. He represented his country at the 1988 and 1996 UEFA European Championships, and at the 1990 and 1994 FIFA World Cups. With Italy, he reached the semi-finals of Euro 1988, and won bronze and silver medals at the 1990 and 1994 World Cups respectively, earning 63 caps and scoring five goals over a decade.

Following his playing career, Donadoni began a career as a manager in 2001, which included spells with Italian clubs Lecco, Livorno and Genoa. He was later appointed head coach of the Italy national team, succeeding Marcello Lippi, who resigned after having won the 2006 World Cup. At Euro 2008, with Donadoni as coach, Italy reached the quarter-finals of the tournament, losing to eventual champions Spain on penalties. On 26 June 2008, Donadoni was dismissed despite having signed a contract extension prior to the beginning of Euro 2008, using a clause in the contract which allowed termination if Italy did not reach the semi-final. He was replaced by Lippi, who returned as national team manager. Following his position as Italy head coach, Donadoni managed Napoli, Cagliari and Parma, until the latter club's bankruptcy in 2015. He joined Bologna the following season and then Chinese Super League club Shenzhen the season after.

== Club career ==
=== Atalanta and AC Milan ===
Donadoni started his career with Atalanta in 1982, winning the Serie C1 title, and the Serie B title in 1984. He joined AC Milan in 1986 and he became a mainstay in the legendary team that dominated Italy and Europe in the late 1980s and early-to-mid-1990s. Usually playing a right-sided wide midfield role, Donadoni was a vital part of Milan's squad under both Arrigo Sacchi and Fabio Capello, winning six Serie A titles, three European Cups, four Supercoppa Italiana, three European Super Cups, and two Intercontinental Cups during his time at Milan. Although Donadoni failed to win the Coppa Italia with Milan, he reached the final twice, during the 1989–90 and 1997–98 seasons.

During the 1988–89 European Cup campaign, Donadoni was knocked unconscious and suffered a broken jaw after a violent tackle from Goran Vasilijević in the second leg of the second-round match against Red Star Belgrade. He required treatment on the pitch from Milan masseur Angelo Pagani, Milan doctor Ginko Monti, and a member of the Red Star medical staff to stop him choking; he was rushed to hospital, where he regained consciousness soon after. The match ended in a 1–1 draw, and went to a penalty shoot-out as a result of the 2–2 aggregate scoreline, with Milan prevailing and advancing to the next round. On 19 April 1989, he scored a goal in a 5–0 win over Real Madrid in the second leg of the 1988–89 European Cup semi-finals, which saw Milan advance to the final 6–1 on aggregate. In the final of the European Cup, he assisted Gullit's goal in a 4–0 win over Steaua București.

He provided the assist for Daniele Massaro's goal in a 4–0 victory over Barcelona in the 1994 UEFA Champions League final.

=== MetroStars ===
After winning his fifth Serie A title with Milan, he went on to play in Major League Soccer (MLS) in the United States. The NY/NJ MetroStars of MLS made him a centerpiece of their franchise when they signed him in 1996. During his first year with the Metros, he was recalled to the Italy national team. He proved a solid performer, being named to the league Best XI in 1996, and was also named an MLS Eastern Conference All-Star, winning the inaugural 1996 MLS All-Star Game 3–2 over the Western Conference MLS All-Stars. Unfortunately, Donadoni's play could not bring the MetroStars any success as a club. In total, Donadoni scored six goals for the MetroStars.

=== Second spell at Milan and final season with Al-Ittihad ===
Donadoni briefly rejoined Milan after the 1997 MLS season, helping lead them to another Coppa Italia final in 1998 during Fabio Capello's second spell with the club. He also won another Serie A title under Alberto Zaccheroni in 1999, his sixth and final career Serie A title. In total, Donadoni scored 18 career Serie A goals for Milan in 287 appearances, and 23 in 390 appearances throughout all competitions.

He ended his career by playing for a short time with Al-Ittihad of Saudi Arabia, winning the Saudi Premier League during the 1999–2000 season, and officially retiring from professional football soon after.

== International career ==
=== Youth career, senior debut, Euro 88, and 1990 World Cup ===
A member of the Italy under-21 national football team, reaching the final of the 1986 UEFA European Under-21 Championship, Donadoni made his Italy national team senior debut on 8 October 1986, under Azeglio Vicini in a 2–0 victory over Greece.

He soon became a key member of his national side, reaching the semi-finals of Euro 1988, and he subsequently played in the 1990 FIFA World Cup, on home soil, helping Italy to a third place finish. Unfortunately, he missed one of the penalties in the fateful semi-final shoot-out against defending champions and eventual runners-up Argentina. Overall, he made five appearances throughout the tournament, missing out on the 2–0 round of 16 victory against Uruguay due to injury, and the 2–1 bronze medal match victory against England. For his performances, he was named to the 1990 FIFA World Cup All-Star Team.

=== 1994 World Cup and Euro 96 ===
Donadoni also took part at the 1994 World Cup, under Arrigo Sacchi, helping Italy to a second-place finish, where Italy would once again be defeated on penalties, by Brazil, after a goalless draw. However, on this occasion Donadoni did not take a penalty in the final shoot-out. En route to the final, he set up Dino Baggio's goal in Italy's 2–1 quarter-final victory over Spain, and also provided the throw-in on the left flank from which Roberto Baggio scored his first goal in Italy's 2–1 over Bulgaria in the semi-finals of the tournament. Throughout the tournament, he completed the second most dribbles (28), behind only Bulgaria's Krasimir Balakov (31).

He also represented Italy at Euro 1996, which would be his final international tournament prior to his international retirement, appearing in all three group matches. His final appearance for Italy was on 19 June 1996, in the final group match, which ended in a 0–0 draw against the eventual champions Germany, eliminating the Italians in the first round of the tournament. Overall, Donadoni made 63 appearances for Italy, scoring five goals.

== Player profile ==
=== Reception and legacy ===
Donadoni is regarded by several pundits as one of Italy's greatest ever wingers and by some as one of the best players in his position, both of his era and in the history of the game. He is also considered to be one of the best players of his generation, one of Italy's greatest players after World War II, and one of the greatest players in AC Milan's history. He was an important member of his club and national sides throughout his career. Michel Platini described him as Italy's greatest player of the 1990s.

=== Style of play ===
Donadoni was a consistent, versatile, and talented player, who was capable of playing anywhere in midfield except for defensive midfield. Due to his versatility, he could play on either wing, through the centre, or as an attacking midfielder, although he was most frequently deployed on the right flank, but would often switch positions over the course of a match. When deployed on the left wing, he often cut inside into the centre of the pitch. He stood out for his explosive pace, agility, dribbling skills, creativity, and technical ability; he often beat players with feints both in one on one situations, or when undertaking individual runs. He was also known for his stamina, defensive work-rate, and tactical intelligence, which enabled him to function as a box-to-box player. Particularly in his later career he operated in a more creative midfield role as a playmaker, due to his ability to orchestrate attacking moves for his team with his vision and passing. Donadoni was capable of delivering assists to teammates in the area from curling crosses or set-pieces. Although he was not a particularly prolific player in front of goal throughout his career, he was also a powerful and accurate striker of the ball from distance with either foot, despite being naturally right-footed, and an effective free kick taker. He was also known for his reserved character off the pitch. Regarding his playing style, Donadoni once commented "My greatest satisfaction comes from making the pass that leads to the goal." Some of his major influences were Gianni Rivera, Johann Cruyff, and Franz Beckenbauer.

== Managerial career ==
=== Early club career: Lecco, Livorno, and Genoa ===
After retiring as a player, Donadoni trained to become a coach. His first job was as Lecco and he made his debut on 12 August 2001 in the Coppa Italia Lega Pro. This was followed by jobs with Livorno (2002–03) and Genoa (2003). In 2005, he returned to head Livorno in mid-season. After leading them to a surprising ninth-place finish and having the club in sixth place midway through the 2005–06 season, Donadoni resigned over criticism from club chairman Aldo Spinelli.

=== International career ===
In July 2006, following the resignation of Marcello Lippi three days after the Italy national team won the 2006 FIFA World Cup, Donadoni was named as new Italian head coach, his first task being to successfully lead Italy through qualification for UEFA Euro 2008.

On 16 August, Donadoni made his Italy head coaching debut in a friendly match against Croatia played at Stadio Armando Picchi, Livorno, which did not feature any of the 23 world champions, save for third goalkeeper Marco Amelia, and ended in a 2–0 defeat. Donadoni took solace in the fact Lippi's first match in charge of the Azzurri was also a 2–0 friendly defeat, to Iceland in August 2004.

==== Path to Euro 2008 ====
Donadoni's competitive debut came in Euro 2008 qualifying. Italy drew its first match 1–1 with Lithuania, then lost 3–1 to France. Accordingly, Italian newspaper La Nazione's front page featured, "How to reduce Lippi's masterwork to pieces in just three weeks," requesting the return of Lippi. However, despite all the critics, Donadoni led Italy to five consecutive wins to Georgia (3–1), Ukraine (2–0) and Scotland (2–0), the former being controversial for his omission of star Alessandro Del Piero from the squad. One of the main criticisms addressed by the media towards Donadoni was his alleged lack of pressure in persuading Francesco Totti to play again for the Azzurri. Following a question regarding a possible call-up for the Roma player, Donadoni jokingly claimed not to know him.

Italy qualified for Euro 2008 after a successful campaign, topping the group ahead of France, in spite of the shaky start. They defeated Scotland 2–1 in Glasgow to confirm their qualification.

==== Euro 2008 campaign ====
On 9 June 2008, Donadoni was handed the biggest defeat for Italy's national team in over 25 years by former Milan teammate Marco van Basten, a 3–0 loss to the Netherlands. Italy captain Fabio Cannavaro was unable to play due to injury, and Donadoni was widely criticised for his choice of players for the match. His team drew the subsequent match with Romania on 13 June, despite some controversial officiating which saw a goal called back in each of these games creating intense criticism of the officials. The team then beat France 2–0 on 17 June to progress to the quarter-finals against much-fancied Spain, the eventual champions. The two teams played out a 0–0 draw, the only match Spain was held scoreless in regular time throughout the tournament. However, the Spaniards won 4–2 on penalties.

After Italy's disappointing performance at the tournament, on 26 June 2008 Donadoni was sacked by the Italian Football Federation (FIGC), which named Lippi as his replacement.

=== Post-international club coaching career ===
==== Napoli ====
On 10 March 2009, Napoli announced it had appointed Donadoni as its new head coach following the termination of Edoardo Reja after five years leading the club. Donadoni's first match in charge was a 1–1 draw with Reggina.

After a 2–1 loss to Roma on 6 October 2009, Donadoni was terminated as Napoli manager. He was replaced by former Sampdoria coach Walter Mazzarri.

==== Cagliari ====
On 16 November 2010, it was announced Donadoni would become head coach of Serie A relegation battlers Cagliari, replacing Pierpaolo Bisoli. After joining Cagliari, the club won its next two matches, 2–1 against Brescia on 21 November and 3–2 against Lecce on 28 November.

However, on 12 August 2011, two weeks prior to the start of the 2011–12 Serie A, Donadoni was surprisingly sacked by Cagliari chairman Massimo Cellino. Italian press sources cited divergencies between Donadoni and Cellino regarding the sale of Alessandro Matri to Juventus and the affair involving David Suazo, who first joined the pre-season training camp only to be asked to leave days later.

Donadoni was in talks with Iran Pro League side Persepolis in December 2011. However, no contract was reached.

==== Parma ====
On 9 January 2012, Donadoni was unveiled as head coach of Serie A club Parma, replacing Franco Colomba. Upon arriving at the club, the situation in the league table was critical for Parma, being close to the relegation zone.

Parma's results improved immediately under Donadoni, winning seven Serie A matches in a row, a club record. Parma would finish the season in eighth place in the league table, equal on points with seventh-placed Roma.

Donadoni's initial contract ran until 2013, but this was extended by two years in October 2012, the longest deal club president Tommaso Ghirardi had made with a head coach. At the end of the 2012–13 season, Parma impressed and finished in a comfortable tenth place, despite initial fears it would be relegated. In 2014, Donadoni guided Parma to sixth place in Serie A, helping the club to qualify for the UEFA Europa League for the first time since 2007. However, their entry to the tournament was barred because of the late payment of income tax on salaries, failing to qualify for a UEFA license, for which the club would also be docked seven points during the 2014–15 Serie A season.

The following season, Parma's continuing severe financial difficulties led to the club's eventual bankruptcy in March 2015, which meant the club be relegated. Although the FIGC allowed the club to complete the league season in Serie A, they finished bottom of the league in 20th place. Donadoni, who reported that he, as well as the Parma staff and players, had not received wages since July 2014, left the club at the end of the season.

==== Bologna ====
In October 2015, Donadoni was hired by newly promoted Serie A club Bologna as the club's new coach, replacing Delio Rossi. Donadoni parted with Bologna on 24 May 2018.

==== Shenzhen FC ====
On 30 July 2019, Donadoni was appointed as manager of Chinese club Shenzhen FC.

==== Spezia Calcio ====
On 4 November 2025, almost six years after his last experience on the bench, Donadoni was signed by Spezia in Serie B in place of the sacked Luca D'Angelo.

== Managerial statistics ==
As of 23 March 2026

Managerial record by team and tenure
Team	Nat	From	To	Record							
Team	Nat	From	To	G	W	D	L	GF	GA	GD	Win %
Lecco	(Italy)	2 July 2001	3 December 2001	18	6	5	7	25	21	+4	33.33
Lecco	(Italy)	20 March 2002	22 June 2002	7	3	3	1	9	5	+4	42.86
Livorno	(Italy)	22 June 2002	30 June 2003	41	14	13	14	54	48	+6	34.15
Genoa	(Italy)	30 June 2003	21 September 2003	6	1	1	4	4	7	−3	16.67
Livorno	(Italy)	11 January 2005	6 February 2006	46	17	16	13	60	62	−2	36.96
Italy	(Italy)	13 July 2006	26 June 2008	23	13	5	5	35	22	+13	56.52
Napoli	(Italy)	10 March 2009	6 October 2009	19	5	6	8	23	26	−3	26.32
Cagliari	(Italy)	16 November 2010	12 August 2011	27	10	4	13	33	43	−10	37.04
Parma	(Italy)	9 January 2012	22 June 2015	141	47	39	55	181	195	−14	33.33
Bologna	(Italy)	28 October 2015	24 May 2018	108	33	23	52	115	146	−31	30.56
Shenzhen FC	(China)	30 July 2019	11 August 2020	14	2	4	8	23	33	−10	14.29
Spezia	(Italy)	4 November 2025	23 March 2026	21	6	5	10	21	31	−10	28.57
Total				471	157	124	190	583	639	−56	33.33

== Honours ==
=== Player ===
Milan

- Serie A: 1987–88, 1991–92, 1992–93, 1993–94, 1995–96, 1998–99
- Coppa Italia runner-up: 1989–90, 1997–98
- Supercoppa Italiana: 1992, 1993, 1994
- European Cup/UEFA Champions League: 1988–89, 1989–90, 1993–94
- European Super Cup: 1989, 1990, 1994
- Intercontinental Cup: 1989, 1990

Atalanta

- Serie B: 1983–84
- Serie C1: 1981–82

Al-Ittihad

- Saudi Premier League: 1999–2000

Italy

- FIFA World Cup runner-up: 1994; third place: 1990
- UEFA European Championship semi-finalist: 1988
- UEFA U-21 European Football Championship runner-up: 1986

Individual

- Serie A Team of The Year: 1986
- FIFA World Cup All-Star Team: 1990
- MLS All-star: 1996, 1997
- MLS Best XI: 1996
- Premio Nazionale Carriera Esemplare "Gaetano Scirea": 1998
- Premio internazionale Giacinto Facchetti: 2015
- AC Milan Hall of Fame

=== Orders ===
- 5th Class / Knight: Cavaliere Ordine al Merito della Repubblica Italiana: 1991
