= 1990 Supercoppa Italiana =

- Event: Supercoppa Italiana
Napoli	Juventus
Serie A	Coppa Italia
5	1
- Date: 1 September 1990
- Venue: Stadio San Paolo, Naples, Italy
- Referee: Carlo Longhi
- Attendance: 62,404

The 1990 Supercoppa Italiana was a pre-season football match contested by the 1989–90 Serie A winners Napoli and the 1989–90 Coppa Italia winners Juventus.

The match resulted in a 5–1 win for Napoli.

== Match details ==
1 September 1990
20:45 CET

Napoli	5–1	Juventus
Silenzi 8', 45'; Careca 20', 71'; Crippa 44'	(Report)	Baggio 39'

Stadio San Paolo, Naples
Attendance: 62,404
Referee: Carlo Longhi

Napoli	Juventus

NAPOLI:
GK	1	(Italy) Giovanni Galli
DF	2	(Italy) Ciro Ferrara	(yellow card) 38'
DF	3	(Italy) Giovanni Francini
MF	4	(Italy) Massimo Crippa		(substituted off) 80'
MF	5	(Brazil) Alemão
DF	6	(Italy) Marco Baroni
DF	7	(Italy) Giancarlo Corradini	(yellow card) 74'
MF	8	(Italy) Fernando De Napoli
FW	9	(Brazil) Careca
AM	10	(Argentina) Diego Maradona (c)
FW	11	(Italy) Andrea Silenzi		(substituted off) 70'
Substitutes:
DF	13	(Italy) Ivan Rizzardi		(substituted in) 80'
MF	14	(Italy) Massimo Mauro		(substituted in) 70'
Manager:
(Italy) Alberto Bigon

JUVENTUS:
GK	1	(Italy) Stefano Tacconi (c)
RB	2	(Italy) Nicolò Napoli
CB	5	(Brazil) Júlio César
CB	6	(Italy) Luigi de Agostini
LB	3	(Italy) Dario Bonetti		(substituted off) 46'
RM	7	(Germany) Thomas Häßler		(substituted off) 46'
CM	4	(Italy) Roberto Galia
LM	8	(Italy) Giancarlo Marocchi
RF	9	(Italy) Pierluigi Casiraghi
CF	11	(Italy) Salvatore Schillaci
LF	10	(Italy) Roberto Baggio
Substitutes:
DF	13	(Italy) Marco De Marchi	(yellow card) 57'	(substituted in) 46'
MF	14	(Italy) Daniele Fortunato		(substituted in) 46'
Manager:
(Italy) Luigi Maifredi

MATCH OFFICIALS

- Assistant referees:
- Fourth official:

MATCH RULES

- 90 minutes.
- 30 minutes of extra-time if necessary.
- Penalty shoot-out if scores still level.
- Five named substitutes
- Maximum of 2 substitutions.

== See also ==
- 1990–91 Serie A
- 1990–91 Coppa Italia
- 1990–91 Juventus FC season
- 1990–91 SSC Napoli season
- Juventus FC–SSC Napoli rivalry

Played between same clubs:

- 2012 Supercoppa Italiana
- 2014 Supercoppa Italiana
- 2020 Supercoppa Italiana
