= Andrea Silenzi =

Italian footballer (born 1966)

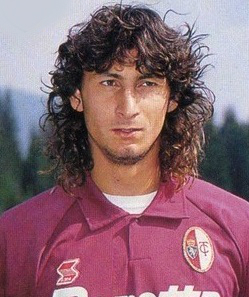

Personal information
- Date of birth: 10 February 1966 (age 60)
- Place of birth: Rome, Italy
- Height: 1.91 m (6 ft 3 in)
- Position: Centre forward

Youth career
- Pescatori Ostia
- Lodigiani

Senior career*
Years	Team	Apps	(Gls)
1984–1987	Lodigiani	49	(18)
1987–1988	Arezzo	19	(0)
1988–1990	Reggiana	67	(32)
1990–1992	Napoli	39	(6)
1992–1995	Torino	82	(24)
1995–1997	Nottingham Forest	12	(0)
1996–1997	→ Venezia (loan)	26	(4)
1997–1998	Reggiana	8	(0)
1998–1999	Ravenna	23	(3)
1999–2000	Torino	11	(2)
2000–2001	Ravenna	7	(0)
Total		343	(87)

International career
1994	Italy	1	(0)
- * Club domestic league appearances and goals

Andrea Silenzi (Italian pronunciation: [anˈdrɛːa siˈlɛntsi]; born 10 February 1966) is an Italian retired footballer who played as a centre forward.

He was the first Italian to play in the Premier League, when he signed with Nottingham Forest in 1995. He amassed Serie A totals of 132 games and 32 goals over six seasons, with Napoli and Torino.

Silenzi appeared once for the Italy national team, in 1994.

== Club career ==
=== Early years ===
Silenzi was born in Rome. Nicknamed Pennellone (Big brush) due to his height, he began his playing career with local A.S. Lodigiani. During his third season there he started scoring, and finished as second top scorer in Serie C2 with 18 goals. In the next season he moved to Serie B with A.C. Arezzo, but the campaign was a disaster both individually and collectively; the club finished last and was relegated to Serie C1, with the player appearing in 19 games and failing to find the net once.

Silenzi was transferred to another third level side, A.C. Reggiana 1919, for 1988–89, where his fortunes changed dramatically. The team won promotion that year, finishing in first place, with him contributing nine goals in 31 appearances. The next season he fared even better, finishing as the league's top scorer in division two; he scored an astonishing 23 goals out of the squad's 33, doing it in 38 matches for the best goal-per-match ratio in the competition.

=== Napoli ===
Silenzi's prolific scoring garnered the attention of Scudetto and Coppa Italia winners S.S.C. Napoli, which was looking to strengthen its attacking options in a team which already featured Diego Maradona. He was ultimately acquired for 6 billion lira, and 1990–91 started brightly with the capture of the Supercoppa Italiana – a 5–1 thrashing of Juventus FC, with him contributing with two of the five goals. However, the rest of that season proved unlucky for the player, who only managed two Serie A goals (Maradona only netted six, all on penalties); the team finished eighth but went on to rank fourth the following year, mainly thanks to the firepower of Careca and Gianfranco Zola who had taken over for the banned Maradona – he only scored four times from 20 appearances.

=== Torino ===
The next season Silenzi, aged 26, was signed by Torino FC, brought in with some of the funds that the club made on the then world-record sale of Gianluigi Lentini to A.C. Milan. The team finished in ninth place, and he again grabbed only a handful of league goals (three). The only bright spot of the campaign was the conquest of the team's fifth Italian Cup, as he endeared himself to the fans with his display in the final, where Toro defeated A.S. Roma after two legs on the away goals rule, the aggregate score being 5–5; he scored both of the crucial goals in the second leg in Rome (5–2 loss).

Silenzi had his best top-flight year in 1993–94, as he finished the season with 17 goals (tied for third in the scorers list) and also reached the semi-finals of the domestic cup. He spearheaded the attacking trio of Enzo Francescoli and a young Benito Carbone, and his impressive form garnered him a call-up to the Italy national team in early 1994; the following year saw the arrival of Ruggiero Rizzitelli, and he took over the leading goal-scoring spot from Silenzi, which translated into 15 more goals (19 to four).

=== Nottingham Forest ===
In the summer of 1995, Silenzi was signed by Nottingham Forest's manager Frank Clark for £1.8m, becoming the first ever Italian to play in the Premier League. However, he never fitted into the set-up at the City Ground, playing only ten league games in the 1995–96 season; after only two appearances in the following campaign, he returned to his country and joined S.S.C. Venezia on loan.

In total, Silenzi made only 20 official appearances (seven starts) for Forest, scoring twice: one in the FA Cup against Oxford United and one in the League Cup against Bradford City. It is alleged that his contract was torn up by manager Dave Bassett (who took over in March 1997), for allegedly refusing to return from his loan spell at Venezia. In the English press, he is considered as one of the worst ever signings in the country.

=== Late career ===
Silenzi continued his career with various clubs back in Italy, going on to play for Reggiana and Ravenna Calcio and also returning to Torino for a sole season, his two goals being too little to save Emiliano Mondonico's side from top-flight relegation. He retired in 2001 at the age of 35, with another return, at Ravenna, failing to find the net during 2000–01's second tier.

Following his retirement, Silenzi worked for Torino as one of the club's directors. In March 2009, he was appointed as the head of the A.S. Cisco Calcio Roma youth sector.

== International career ==
Silenzi's only cap for Italy came on 16 February 1994, as he played against France as part of the warm-up process for the FIFA World Cup being held that summer. In the match held in Naples (0–1 loss), he came on as a second-half substitute.

== Style of play ==
Silenzi was a tall and "old-fashioned" centre forward, who was primarily known for his physical strength, heading, and acrobatic ability in the air, but equally for his inconsistency at the top level, as well as his lack of notable technical ability.

== Personal life ==
Silenzi is a Protestant, belonging to the Seventh-day Adventist Church.

His son, Christian, is also a footballer.

== Honours ==
=== Club ===
Reggiana

- Serie C1: 1988–89

Napoli

- Supercoppa Italiana: 1990

Torino

- Coppa Italia: 1992–93

=== Individual ===
- Serie B: Top scorer, Chevron Award (best goal-per-game ratio) 1989–90
