= Gianluca Francesconi =

Italian footballer

Personal information
- Date of birth: 10 September 1971 (age 55)
- Height: 1.80 m (5 ft 11 in)
- Position: Defender

Senior career*
Years	Team	Apps	(Gls)
1988–1990	Lodigiani	7	(0)
1990–1991	Napoli	1	(0)
1991–1993	Reggiana	44	(0)
1993–1994	Juventus	4	(0)
1994–1997	Genoa	50	(1)
1997–1998	Pescara	23	(0)
1998–1999	Lodigiani	5	(0)
1999–2001	Brescello	6	(0)
2002–2004	Lodigiani	20	(0)
- * Club domestic league appearances and goals

Gianluca Francesconi (born 10 September 1971 in Rome) is a retired Italian professional footballer who played as a defender.

== Career ==
Francesconi gained acclaim after helping A.C. Reggiana 1919 gain a historic promotion to Serie A during the 1992–93 season. In the summer, Serie A power Juventus FC signed Francesconi. However, his spell with Juventus was brief and uneventful, as he only made four league appearances before the club sold Francesconi to Genoa C.F.C.
