= Marco Baroni =

Italian football manager (born 1963)

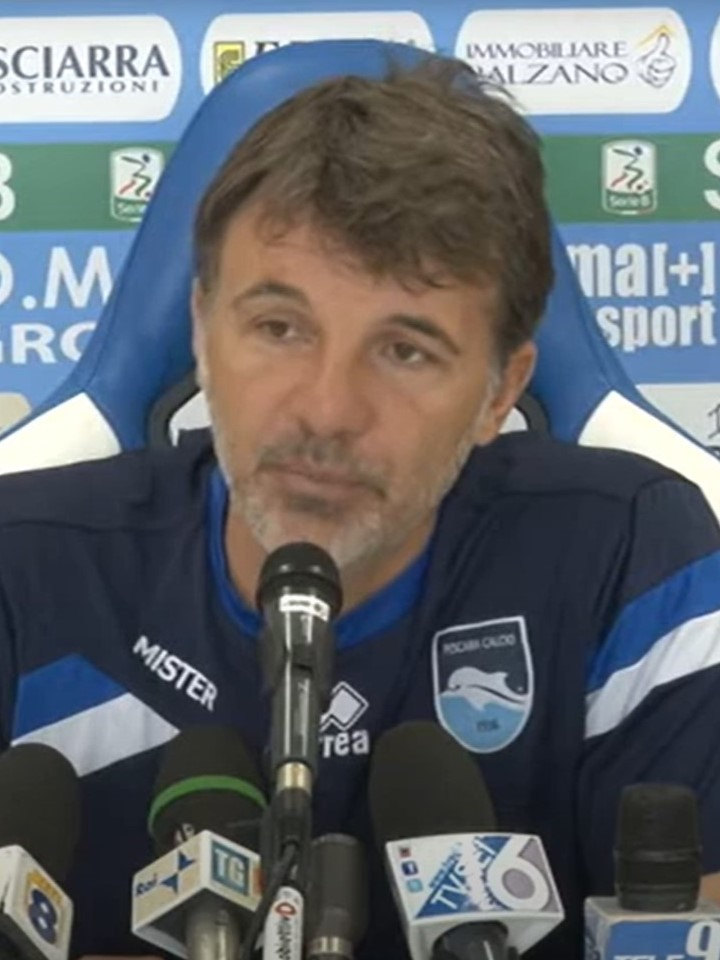
- Baroni in 2015

Personal information
- Full name: Marco Baroni
- Date of birth: 11 September 1963 (age 63)
- Place of birth: Florence, Italy
- Height: 1.85 m (6 ft 1 in)
- Position: Defender

Team information
- Current team: Hellas Verona (head coach)

Youth career
- 1973–1981: Fiorentina

Senior career*
Years	Team	Apps	(Gls)
1981–1982	Fiorentina	1	(0)
1982–1983	Monza	29	(0)
1983–1985	Padova	67	(0)
1985–1986	Udinese	24	(0)
1986–1987	Roma	19	(2)
1987–1989	Lecce	68	(5)
1989–1991	Napoli	54	(2)
1991–1993	Bologna	49	(3)
1993–1994	Poggibonsi	12	(3)
1994–1995	Ancona	29	(3)
1995–1998	Hellas Verona	87	(9)
1998–2000	Rondinella	50	(5)
Total		489	(32)

International career
1985–1990	Italy U21	16	(0)

Managerial career
- 2000–2001: Rondinella
- 2001: Montevarchi
- 2003–2004: Carrarese
- 2005–2006: Südtirol
- 2006–2007: Ancona
- 2009: Siena
- 2010: Cremonese
- 2013–2014: Virtus Lanciano
- 2014–2015: Pescara
- 2015–2016: Novara
- 2016–2017: Benevento
- 2018–2019: Frosinone
- 2019–2020: Cremonese
- 2020–2021: Reggina
- 2021–2023: Lecce
- 2023–2024: Hellas Verona
- 2024–2025: Lazio
- 2025–2026: Torino
- 2026–: Hellas Verona
Medal record
Men's Football
Representing Italy
UEFA European Under-21 Championship
Second place	1986 UEFA
- * Club domestic league appearances and goals

Marco Baroni (born 11 September 1963) is an Italian football manager and former player who played as a defender. He is the head coach of Serie B club Hellas Verona.

== Playing career ==
Baroni started his career with Fiorentina, and reached his football peaks during his time at Napoli, where he played his first seasons as a Serie A regular, winning an Italian championship title (scoring the title-clinching goal on the last day of the season against Lazio) and a Supercoppa Italiana title in 1990. He left Napoli in 1991 to join Bologna, and then left the club due to its financial issues; after a short spell at Serie C2 club Poggibonsi, he then joined Serie B side Ancona, and moved to Verona in 1996, where he enjoyed his last appearances in the Italian top flight. He retired in 2000 after two seasons with hometown Serie C2 club Rondinella.

== Coaching career ==
After he retired from playing football, Baroni was immediately appointed head coach of Rondinella in 2000, and then served with a handful of other Serie C2 clubs such as Montevarchi, Carrarese and Südtirol. In December 2006, he was appointed as new head coach of Serie C1 club Ancona, but failed to complete his season with the biancorossi, and later accepted a youth coach offer from Serie A club Siena. During the 2008–09 season, Baroni guided the Siena Primavera (under-19) team to the Campionato Nazionale Primavera final, which they eventually lost to Palermo.

On 29 October 2009, Siena appointed Baroni as new head coach in order to replace dismissed boss Marco Giampaolo. His reign as first team coach however lasted only three weeks, as he was stripped of his managerial duties on 23 November following a home defeat to Atalanta, with Alberto Malesani being appointed in his place, and Baroni being re-appointed back at his previous role of under-19 team coach.

In June 2010, he was announced as new head coach of Lega Pro Prima Divisione club Cremonese.

In July 2011, he was appointed as youth team coach for Juventus. He left the role in July 2013 to become new head coach of Serie B club Virtus Lanciano. After an impressive start and a less successful end of season with the club ending in tenth place, Baroni and Virtus Lanciano mutually parted ways. He was successively named new head coach of another Serie B team, Pescara, for the 2014–15 season. After a lacklustre season, with Pescara in ninth place and one point out of the promotion playoff zone, Baroni was sacked on 16 May 2015 with one game remaining, being replaced by youth coach Massimo Oddo.

On 23 June, Baroni became the head coach of Novara. He guided the club to a promotion playoff spot, but was not confirmed by the club for the new season and was successively appointed as new head coach of freshly-promoted Serie B club Benevento. In his first season in charge, he led Benevento to fourth place in the regular season and to ultimately win the promotion playoffs after winning a two-legged final against Carpi, thus bringing the Campanian club to Serie A for the first time in its history. He was confirmed as Benevento head coach for the 2017–18 Serie A season. He was sacked on 23 October 2017.

On 19 December 2018, Baroni was appointed the head coach of Frosinone. After Frosinone was relegated from the 2018–19 Serie A season, Baroni's contract was terminated by mutual consent on 2 June 2019.

On 8 October 2019, he was appointed head coach of Serie B club Cremonese. In January 2020, he was however sacked due to poor results.

On 15 December 2020, he was appointed head coach of newly promoted Serie B club Reggina. After guiding Reggina to safety, he left the Calabrians to accept an offer from Serie B promotion hopefuls Lecce for the 2021–22 season. Lecce was promoted to Serie A at the end of the season, and the contract with Baroni was renewed for the 2022–23 season. After the season, Baroni wanted a longer extension to his contract and could not agree with the club. As a result, he left the Salentini and was appointed as manager of Hellas Verona on 1 July 2023.

On 11 June 2024, Baroni was announced as the new head coach of Lazio, joining the club on a two-year contract. Due to the club's strong showing in the first few months of his tenure, Corriere dello Sport reported that President Claudio Lotito had prepared a new contract for him in December 2024, aiming to push back the deadline until 2027, with an option to 2028. However, Lazio subsequently failed to qualify for any European competition for the following season, and Baroni left the club on 2 June 2025.

Baroni was appointed as manager of Torino on 5 June 2025, replacing Paolo Vanoli. Due to poor results, on 23 February 2026, Baroni was sacked.

On 19 June 2026, Baroni was appointed again as the new head coach of Serie B club Hellas Verona, signing a two year contract.

== Personal life ==
His son Riccardo Baroni is a professional footballer.

== Managerial statistics ==
As of 20 November 2026

Managerial record by team and tenure
Team	From	To	Record							
Team	From	To	G	W	D	L	GF	GA	GD	Win %
Rondinella	22 June 2000	16 May 2001	38	12	13	13	51	43	+8	31.58
Montevarchi	16 May 2001	20 November 2001	16	4	4	8	16	20	−4	25.00
Carrarese	7 August 2003	26 April 2004	36	7	10	19	25	52	−27	19.44
Südtirol	31 May 2005	30 June 2006	46	17	19	10	55	44	+11	36.96
Ancona	21 December 2006	19 March 2007	10	1	2	7	6	16	−10	10.00
Siena	29 October 2009	23 November 2009	4	1	1	2	5	7	−2	25.00
Cremonese	23 June 2010	25 October 2010	13	5	4	4	15	15	+0	38.46
Virtus Lanciano	1 July 2013	13 June 2014	43	15	15	13	44	47	−3	34.88
Pescara	28 June 2014	16 May 2015	44	16	14	14	68	57	+11	36.36
Novara	23 June 2015	10 June 2016	47	21	10	16	69	47	+22	44.68
Benevento	29 June 2016	23 October 2017	58	21	15	22	63	70	−7	36.21
Frosinone	19 December 2018	2 June 2019	22	4	5	13	18	34	−16	18.18
Cremonese	8 October 2019	8 January 2020	12	3	5	4	8	11	−3	25.00
Reggina	15 December 2020	31 May 2021	26	10	10	6	31	27	+4	38.46
Lecce	31 May 2021	30 June 2023	80	29	26	25	100	84	+16	36.25
Hellas Verona	1 July 2023	10 June 2024	40	10	11	19	41	54	−13	25.00
Lazio	11 June 2024	2 June 2025	52	27	13	12	87	62	+25	51.92
Torino	5 June 2025	23 February 2026	30	10	6	14	31	51	−20	33.33
Hellas Verona	19 June 2026	Present	14	5	5	4	23	18	+5	35.71
Total			631	218	188	225	756	759	−3	34.55

== Honours ==
=== Player ===
Napoli

- Serie A: 1989–90
- Supercoppa Italiana: 1990

Rondinella

- Campionato Nazionale Dilettanti: 1998–99

Italy U21

- UEFA European Under-21 Championship runner-up: 1986

=== Manager ===
Lecce

- Serie B: 2021–22

Individual

- Serie A Coach of the Month: October 2024
