= Giovanni Galli =

Italian footballer and politician (born 1958)

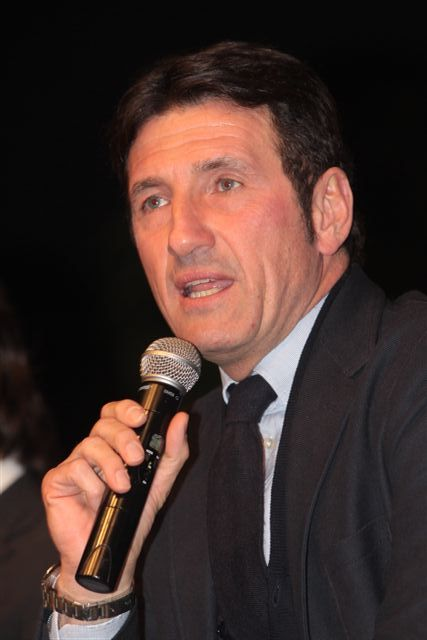
- Galli in 2011

Personal information
- Date of birth: 29 April 1958 (age 68)
- Place of birth: Pisa, Italy
- Height: 1.87 m (6 ft 2 in)
- Position: Goalkeeper

Youth career
- Fiorentina

Senior career*
Years	Team	Apps	(Gls)
1977–1986	Fiorentina	259	(0)
1986–1990	Milan	98	(0)
1990–1993	Napoli	98	(0)
1993–1994	Torino	31	(0)
1994–1995	Parma	10	(0)
1995–1996	Lucchese	26	(0)
Total		522	(0)

International career
1976–1982	Italy U21	22	(0)
1980–1986	Italy	19	(0)
Medal record
Men's football
Representing Italy
FIFA World Cup
Winner	1982 Spain
- * Club domestic league appearances and goals

Giovanni Galli (Italian pronunciation: [dʒoˈvanni ˈɡalli]; born 29 April 1958) is an Italian former professional footballer who played as a goalkeeper, and currently a politician. In a professional career that spanned nearly two decades, he played in 496 Serie A games, mainly with Fiorentina (nine seasons) and Milan (four), winning six major titles with the latter club.

An international in the 1980s, Galli appeared with Italy in two World Cups, and the 1980 UEFA European Football Championship; he was an unused member of the squad that won the 1982 FIFA World Cup and served as Italy's starting goalkeeper at the 1986 FIFA World Cup.

== Club career ==
Born in Pisa, Galli started his career with his home town's youth side as a midfielder before switching to the role of goalkeeper. He began his professional career with ACF Fiorentina in 1977, where he played for nine Serie A seasons. In 1986–87, he joined fellow league side A.C. Milan, being first-choice for three of his four years, and establishing himself as one of Italy's best goalkeepers, winning the Serie A title and the Supercoppa Italiana during his first season. He also started in both of the club's back-to-back European Cup conquests, in 1989 and 1990, also winning consecutive European Supercups in 1989 and 1990, and the Intercontinental Cup in 1989. He also reached the final of the 1989–90 Coppa Italia with Milan. In his final season with the club, he was often alternated and faced competition for a starting spot from back-up Andrea Pazzagli, whom manager Arrigo Sacchi often fielded during league games, while Galli played in European matches.

In the 1990 summer, following Milan's signing of Sebastiano Rossi, 32-year-old Galli left, going on to represent S.S.C. Napoli and appearing in an average of 33 league games during his three-year spell, starting by winning the Italian Supercup, 5–1 against Juventus. In 1993, he played as the starting keeper for Torino Calcio for a single season, reaching the semi-finals of the Coppa Italia, and the quarter-finals of the Cup Winners' Cup, despite a disappointing mid-table finish. He finished his stint in the top division at the end of the 1994–95 season, after being named backup goalkeeper behind Luca Bucci at AC Parma, who won the UEFA Cup that season, and reached the Coppa Italia final, also placing third in Serie A. Galli retired in 1996 at the age of 38 after a brief stint with A.S. Lucchese-Libertas of Serie B.

== International career ==
Galli took part in Italy's victorious 1982 FIFA World Cup expedition, without playing a single match however, as he served as backup to Dino Zoff, alongside Bordon. The same had already happened in the UEFA Euro 1980 tournament, where Italy finished in fourth place on home soil, after reaching the semi-final. Galli made his national team debut in a friendly match against Greece on 5 October 1983, which ended in a 3–0 win to Italy.

As a starter, Galli played in the 1986 World Cup in Mexico under manager Enzo Bearzot, as Italy were ousted in the round of 16 by eventual semi-finalists France, led by Michel Platini. During the tournament, in Italy's 1–1 draw against eventual champions Argentina in their second group match on 5 June, Galli drew criticism in the media for his goalkeeping on Maradona's equaliser. Following the competition, he was no longer called up to Italy. In total, Galli obtained 19 caps for Italy.

== Style of play ==
Considered one of the best goalkeepers in Italy and the world during his prime, Galli was an extremely consistent, composed, reflective, and reliable goalkeeper, with a good physique, despite his tall and slender frame, and who possessed an excellent fundamental goalkeeping technique; indeed, he stood out for his elegance in both his playing style and movements, and as such, he rarely made saves with his feet. He was known in particular for his strong positional sense, handling, and his efficient rather than spectacular playing style, as well as his calm personality and serious demeanour, both on and off the pitch; however, he was also an athletic shot-stopper, with a good spring, who was capable of producing decisive diving saves when necessary. In spite of his reserved character, he was also highly regarded for his charismatic leadership, as well as his mentality, and his ability to communicate with his defenders and organise his back-line, which often inspired a sense of confidence in his teammates. He excelled in Milan's zonal marking system under Sacchi, due to his speed when rushing off his line to claim crosses or anticipate opponents who had beaten the offside trap, which enabled the team to maintain a high defensive line; when his team were attacking, he was often tasked with remaining outside his box to function as a sweeper keeper. He also possessed good distribution, vision, and solid ball skills, which enabled him to play the ball out from the back. (Note: See)

== After retirement ==
In December 2007, Galli joined Hellas Verona F.C. as its director of football, but left after only two months in charge. He also later worked as a football pundit.

== Politics ==
Following his retirement, Galli pursued a career in politics. On 1 March 2009, Galli was announced as the centre-right mayoral candidate in the 2009 local elections in Florence. His candidacy was supported by The People of Freedom, Lega Nord, and a number of minor local movements. In the first round of the election held on 6 and 7 June, he ended in second place, with 32% of votes; he was successively defeated fourteen days later in the second round of the election by centre-left coalition candidate Matteo Renzi, taking only 40% of local votes.

== Personal life ==
Galli is the father of the late Niccolò Galli, a promising young footballer who died in a road accident on 9 February 2001, aged only 17. He is married to Anna, and also has two daughters, Camilla and Carolina.

== Honours ==
Milan

- Serie A: 1987–88
- Supercoppa Italiana: 1988
- European Cup: 1988–89, 1989–90
- European Super Cup: 1989
- Intercontinental Cup: 1989

Napoli

- Supercoppa Italiana: 1990

Parma

- UEFA Cup: 1994–95

Italy

- FIFA World Cup: 1982

Individual

- A.C. Milan Hall of Fame
- Fiorentina Hall of Fame
