= 1990–91 AC Milan season =

Milan
1990–91 season
- Chairman: Silvio Berlusconi
- Manager: Arrigo Sacchi
- Serie A: 2nd (in 1991–92 UEFA Cup)
- Coppa Italia: Semi-finals
- European Cup: Quarter-finals
- European Super Cup: Winners
- Intercontinental Cup: Winners
- Top goalscorer: League: Marco van Basten (11); All: Marco van Basten (11)
- Average home league attendance: 77,488
Home colours	Away colours

AC Milan did not defend their European Cup title for a second consecutive time. The second place in Serie A was the fourth consecutive season when Milan finished inside the top three of the league. The loss in the European Cup quarter-finals rendered a first trophyless season since 1987, which resulted in Arrigo Sacchi leaving his job to take over the national team, being replaced by ex-Juventus and AC Milan midfielder Fabio Capello.

== Squad ==
Note: Flags indicate national team as defined under FIFA eligibility rules; some limited exceptions apply. Players may hold more than one non-FIFA nationality.

Pos.	Nation	Player
GK	ITA	Sebastiano Rossi
GK	ITA	Andrea Pazzagli
DF	ITA	Mauro Tassotti
DF	ITA	Stefano Carobbi
DF	ITA	Alessandro Costacurta
DF	ITA	Filippo Galli
DF	ITA	Franco Baresi
DF	ITA	Giandomenico Costi
DF	ITA	Gianluca Grassadonia
DF	ITA	Paolo Maldini
DF	ITA	Stefano Nava
MF	ITA	Fabio Bellotti
MF	ITA	Mauro Bressan

Pos.	Nation	Player
MF	ITA	Roberto Donadoni
MF	ITA	Stefano Salvatori
MF	ITA	Carlo Ancelotti
MF	NED	Frank Rijkaard
MF	ITA	Giovanni Stroppa
MF	ITA	Massimo Agostini
MF	ITA	Alberigo Evani
MF	ITA	Angelo Carbone
FW	NED	Ruud Gullit
FW	NED	Marco van Basten
FW	ITA	Daniele Massaro
FW	ITA	Marco Simone

=== Transfers ===
In
Pos.	Name	from	Type
GK	Sebastiano Rossi	AC Cesena	–
MF	Angelo Carbone	S.S.C. Bari	
GK	Massimo Taibi	AC Trento	–
DF	Giandomenico Costi	Modena F.C. 2018	
DF	Roberto Lorenzini	Como 1907	
DF	Stefano Nava	Reggiana	
MF	Gianluca Gaudenzi	Hellas Verona	loan ended
FW	Massimo Agostino	AC Cesena	

Out
Pos.	Name	To	Type
GK	Giovanni Galli	S.S.C. Napoli	
MF	Angelo Colombo	S.S.C. Bari	
FW	Stefano Borgonovo	Fiorentina	
DF	Marco Pullo	Pisa	–
DF	Rufo Emiliano Verga	Bologna F.C.	–
MF	Christian Lantignotti	Reggiana	
GK	Francesco Antonioli	AC Cesena	loan
DF	Roberto Lorenzini	Ancona	loan
MF	Diego Fuser	Fiorentina	loan
MF	Demetrio Albertini	Padova	loan

== Competitions ==
=== Serie A ===
==== League table ====
Pos	Team	Pld	W	D	L	GF	GA	GD	Pts	Qualification or relegation
1	Sampdoria (C)	34	20	11	3	57	24	+33	51	Qualification to European Cup
2	Milan (Note: In March 1991, UEFA banned Milan from participating in European competition for one season due to refusing to resume their 1990-91 European Cup quarterfinal match away versus Olympique Marseille. The ban went into effect for the 1991–92 UEFA Cup.)	34	18	10	6	46	19	+27	46	Banned from European competition
3	Internazionale	34	18	10	6	56	31	+25	46	Qualification to UEFA Cup
4	Genoa	34	14	12	8	51	36	+15	40	Qualification to UEFA Cup
5	Torino	34	12	14	8	40	29	+11	38	Qualification to UEFA Cup

Source: 1990–91 Serie A, RSSSF.com
Rules for classification: 1) Points; 2) Head-to-head points; 3) Head-to-head goal difference; 4) Goal difference; 5) Goals scored; 6) Draw.
(C) Champions

==== Results summary ====
Overall								Home						Away					
Pld	W	D	L	GF	GA	GD	Pts	W	D	L	GF	GA	GD	W	D	L	GF	GA	GD
34	18	10	6	46	19	+27	64	12	2	3	28	7	+21	6	8	3	18	12	+6

Source: Competitive matches

==== Results by round ====
Round	1	2	3	4	5	6	7	8	9	10	11	12	13	14	15	16	17	18	19	20	21	22	23	24	25	26	27	28	29	30	31	32	33	34
Ground	H	A	H	A	H	A	H	A	H	A	H	A	H	A	H	A	H	A	H	A	H	A	H	A	H	A	H	A	A	H	H	A	H	A
Result	W	W	W	D	W	D	L	W	L	D	W	D	W	D	W	L	W	D	W	D	W	D	W	L	L	W	W	W	W	D	W	W	L	D
Position	1	1	1	1	1	1	2	2	4	4	4	4	4	3	3	3	4	2	2	1	3	2	3	3	3	3	3	3	3	3	2	2	2	2

Source: Competitive matches
A = Away; H = Home; W = Win; D = Draw; L = Loss; = 1991–92 European Cup; = 1991–92 UEFA Cup

==== Matches ====
9 September 1990 1	Milan	1–0	Genoa	Milan
	Agostini 72'	Report	Ruotolo (red card) 66'	Stadium: San Siro; Attendance: 78,990; Referee: Arcangelo Pezzella

16 September 1990 2	Cesena	0–1	Milan	Cesena
		Report	van Basten 90'	Stadium: Stadio Dino Manuzzi; Attendance: 24,680; Referee: Pietro D'Elia

23 September 1990 3	Milan	2–1	Fiorentina	Milan
	van Basten 29'; Massaro 64'	Report	Fuser 60'	Stadium: San Siro; Attendance: 77,419; Referee: Carlo Sguizzato

30 September 1990 4	Lazio	1–1	Milan	Rome
	Riedle 54'	Report	Evani 89'	Stadium: Stadio Olimpico; Attendance: 50,447; Referee: Pierluigi Pairetto

7 October 1990 5	Milan	2–0	Cagliari	Milan
	van Basten 4', 41' (pen.)	Report	De Paola (red card) 53'	Stadium: San Siro; Attendance: 79,553; Referee: Piero Ceccarini

21 October 1990 6	Napoli	1–1	Milan	Naples
	Maradona 83' (pen.)	Report	Gullit 88'	Stadium: Stadio San Paolo; Attendance: 68,178; Referee: Carlo Longhi

28 October 1990 7	Milan	0–1	Sampdoria	Milan
		Report	Cerezo 68'	Stadium: San Siro; Attendance: 80,163; Referee: Angelo Amendolia

11 November 1990 8	Atalanta	0–2	Milan	Bergamo
	Contratto (red card) 66'	Report	van Basten 25'; Massaro 76'	Stadium: Stadio Comunale; Attendance: 29,229; Referee: Gianni Beschin

18 November 1990 9	Milan	0–1	Inter Milan	Milan
		Report	Berti 85'	Stadium: San Siro; Attendance: 83,803; Referee: Pietro D'Elia

25 November 1990 10	Torino	1–1	Milan	Turin
	Lentini 31'	Report	Maldini 90'	Stadium: Stadio delle Alpi; Attendance: 43,849; Referee: Tullio Lanese

2 December 1990 11	Milan	1–0	Lecce	Milan
	Rijkaard 85'	Report	Carannante (red card) 46'; Moriero (red card) 66'	Stadium: San Siro; Attendance: 75,872; Referee: Bruno Di Cola

16 December 1990 12	Roma	0–0	Milan	Rome
		Report		Stadium: Stadio Olimpico; Attendance: 59,212; Referee: Angelo Amendolia

30 December 1990 13	Milan	2–0	Juventus	Milan
	Ancelotti 46'; Gullit 55'	Report		Stadium: San Siro; Attendance: 83,921; Referee: Gianni Beschin

6 January 1991 14	Bologna	1–1	Milan	Bologna
	Türkyılmaz 35'	Report	Gullit 8'	Stadium: Stadio Renato Dall'Ara; Attendance: 34,061; Referee: Sergio Coppetelli

13 January 1991 15	Milan	2–0	Bari	Milan
	Gullit 30'; Brambati 58' (o.g.)	Report		Stadium: San Siro; Attendance: 75,315; Referee: Alfredo Trentalange

20 January 1991 16	Parma	2–0	Milan	Parma
	Melli 6', 34'	Report		Stadium: Stadio Ennio Tardini; Attendance: 20,954; Referee: Carlo Sguizzato

23 January 1991 17	Milan	1–0	Pisa	Milan
	Massaro 20'	Report	Boccafresca (red card) 45'	Stadium: San Siro; Attendance: 75,214; Referee: Walter Cinciripini
Note: The match was scheduled for 9 December 1990, but moved because of Milan's involvement in the 1990 Intercontinental Cup

27 January 1991 18	Genoa	1–1	Milan	Genoa
	Aguilera 73' (pen.)	Report	Massaro 57'	Stadium: Stadio Luigi Ferraris; Attendance: 37,282; Referee: Arcangelo Pezzella

3 February 1991 19	Milan	2–0	Cesena	Milan
	Massaro 2' van Basten 53' (pen.)	Report		Stadium: San Siro; Attendance: 72,983; Referee: Giovanni Merlino

10 February 1991 20	Fiorentina	0–0	Milan	Florence
		Report		Stadium: Stadio Comunale; Attendance: 34,835; Referee: Fabio Baldas

17 February 1991 21	Milan	3–1	Lazio	Milan
	van Basten 44'; Gullit 46'; Massaro 51'	Report	Troglio 62'	Stadium: San Siro; Attendance: 75,395; Referee: Loris Stafoggia

24 February 1991 22	Cagliari	1–1	Milan	Cagliari
	Matteoli 62'	Report	Maldini 29'	Stadium: Stadio Sant'Elia; Attendance: 35,713; Referee: Alfredo Trentalange

3 March 1991 23	Milan	4–1	Napoli	Milan
	Ferrara 21' (o.g.); Gullit 41'; Rijkaard 57'; Donadoni 67'	Report	Incocciati 73'	Stadium: San Siro; Attendance: 82,043; Referee: Sergio Coppetelli

10 March 1991 24	Sampdoria	2–0	Milan	Genoa
	Vialli 52' (pen.); Mancini 70'	Report		Stadium: Stadio Luigi Ferraris; Attendance: 38,400; Referee: Pietro D'Elia

17 March 1991 25	Milan	0–1	Atalanta	Milan
		Report	Evair 50'	Stadium: San Siro; Attendance: 76,739; Referee: Luciano Luci

24 March 1991 26	Inter Milan	0–1	Milan	Milan
		Report	van Basten 74'	Stadium: San Siro; Attendance: 80,172; Referee: Arcangelo Pezzella

30 March 1991 27	Milan	1–0	Torino	Milan
	Cravero 59' (o.g.)	Report		Stadium: San Siro; Attendance: 79,796; Referee: Sergio Coppetelli

7 April 1991 28	Lecce	0–3	Milan	Lecce
		Report	Simone 38'; Donadoni 71'; Gullit 90'	Stadium: Stadio Via del Mare; Attendance: 23,625; Referee: Fabio Baldas

14 April 1991 29	Pisa	0–1	Milan	Pisa
		Report	Maldini 66'	Stadium: Arena Garibaldi; Attendance: 20,797; Referee: Gianni Beschin

20 April 1991 30	Milan	1–1	Roma	Milan
	Agostini 90'	Report	Rizzitelli 87'	Stadium: San Siro; Attendance: 78,064; Referee: Carlo Sguizzato

5 May 1991 31	Juventus	0–3	Milan	Turin
		Report	Simone 3'; Maldini 13'; Evani 78'	Stadium: Stadio delle Alpi; Attendance: 57,794; Referee: Luciano Luci

12 May 1991 32	Milan	6–0	Bologna	Milan
	van Basten 17', 64' (pen.), 72'; Evani 55'; Simone 58'; Rijkaard 90'	Report		Stadium: San Siro; Attendance: 75,486; Referee: Marcello Nicchi

19 May 1991 33	Bari	2–1	Milan	Bari
	João Paulo 4', 65'	Report	Simone 53'	Stadium: Stadio San Nicola; Attendance: 42,549; Referee: Angelo Amendolia

26 May 1991 34	Milan	0–0	Parma	Milan
		Report		Stadium: San Siro; Attendance: 83,520; Referee: Fabio Baldas

=== Coppa Italia ===
Round of 16

5 September 1990	Milan	1–0	Triestina	Milan
	Agostini 10' (pen.)	Report		Stadium: San Siro; Attendance: 6 936; Referee: Quartuccio

12 September 1990 Second leg	Triestina	1–1	Milan	Trieste
	Romano 17'	Report	76' Simone	Stadium: Giuseppe Grezar; Attendance: 14 108; Referee: Longhi

Eightfinals

14 November 1990	Milan	3–0	Lecce	Milan
	Ferri 52' (o.g.); Salvatori 83'; Agostini 90'	Report		Stadium: Stadio Giuseppe Meazza; Attendance: 3 016; Referee: Pezzella

21 November 1990 Second leg	Lecce	2–2	Milan	Lecce
	D'Onofrio 21'; Monaco 81'	Report	9' Massaro; 63' Borneo	Stadium: Stadio Via del Mare; Attendance: 1,528; Referee: Felicani (Bologna)

Quarterfinals

6 February 1991	Bari	0–1	Milan	Bari
		Report	77' Simone	Stadium: San Nicola; Attendance: 31 900; Referee: Lanese

20 February 1991	Milan	0–0	Bari	Milan
		Report		Stadium: Giuseppe Meazza; Attendance: 3749; Referee: Luci

Semifinals

13 March 1991	Milan	0–0	Roma	Milan
		Report		Stadium: Giuseppe Meazza; Attendance: 8 689; Referee: Baldas

2 April 1991	Roma	1–0 (1–0 agg.)	Milan	Rome
	van Basten 24' (o.g.)	Report		Stadium: Olimpico; Attendance: 45 331; Referee: D'Elia

=== European Cup ===
==== First round ====
Milan were the defending champions and were given a bye to the second round due to both Liverpool F.C. (1985 Heysel disaster) and Ajax Amsterdam (1989 Iron rod incident) being banned in the tournament.

==== Round of 16 ====
24 October 1990 First Leg	Milan (Italy)	0–0	(Belgium) Club Brugge	Milan, Italy
20:30 CEST (UTC+01:00)	Costacurta (yellow card) 27'; Ancelotti (yellow card) 85'	Report	Janevski (yellow card) 25'; Beyens (yellow card) 63'; Creve (yellow card) 72'	Stadium: San Siro; Attendance: 71,307; Referee: Hubert Forstinger (Austria)

7 November 1990 Second Leg	Club Brugge (Belgium)	0–1	(Italy) Milan	Bruges, Belgium
20:30 CEST (UTC+01:00)	Janevski (yellow card) 63'; Borkelmans (yellow card) 64'	Report	Carbone 47'; Baresi (yellow card) 63' van Basten (red card) 83'	Stadium: Olympiastadion; Attendance: 23,500; Referee: David F.T. Syme (Scotland)

==== Quarter-finals ====
6 March 1991 First Leg	Milan (Italy)	1–1	(France) Marseille	Milan, Italy
20:30 CEST (UTC+01:00)	Gullit 14'	Report	Papin 27'; Pardo (yellow card) 41'	Stadium: San Siro; Attendance: 81,051; Referee: Bruno Galler (Switzerland)

20 March 1991 Second Leg	Marseille (France)	1–0	(Italy) Milan	Marseille, France
20:30 CEST (UTC+01:00)	Amoros (yellow card) 61'; Mozer (yellow card) 69'; Waddle 72'	Report	Tassotti (yellow card) 28'; Ancelotti (yellow card) 30'; Evani (yellow card) 53'	Stadium: Stade Vélodrome; Attendance: 37,603; Referee: Bo Karlsson (Sweden)
Note: Match abandoned in injury time when two of the four floodlights in the stadium failed. When power was restored after 15 minutes, Milan refused to go back on the pitch. UEFA awarded a 3–0 win to Marseille and banned Milan from the competition for the 1991–92 season.

=== Intercontinental Cup ===
9 December 1990	Milan (Italy)	3–0	(Paraguay) Olimpia	Tokyo, Japan
12:00 CEST (UTC+09:00)	Rijkaard 43', 65'; Stroppa 62'		Fernández (yellow card) 25'	Stadium: National Stadium; Attendance: 60,228; Referee: José Roberto Wright (Brazil)

=== European Super Cup ===
10 October 1990 1	Sampdoria (Italy)	1–1	(Italy) Milan	Genoa, Italy
20:30 CEST (UTC+01:00)	Mikhailichenko 31'; Invernizzi (yellow card); Mancini (yellow card)		Evani 39'; Massaro (yellow card)	Stadium: Stadio Luigi Ferraris; Attendance: 19,724; Referee: José Rosa dos Santos (Portugal)

29 November 1990 2	Milan (Italy)	2–0	(Italy) Sampdoria	Bologna, Italy
20:30 CEST (UTC+01:00)	Gullit 44'; Rijkaard 76'			Stadium: Stadio Renato Dall'Ara; Attendance: 20,924; Referee: Zoran Petrović (Yugoslavia)

== Statistics ==
=== Players statistics ===
No.	Pos	Nat	Player	Total		Serie A		Coppa Italia		European Cup	
No.	Pos	Nat	Player	Apps	Goals	Apps	Goals	Apps	Goals	Apps	Goals
	GK	(Italy) ITA	Pazzagli	28	-17	25	-16	0	0	3	-1
	DF	(Italy) ITA	Tassotti	34	0	26+2	0	2	0	4	0
	DF	(Italy) ITA	Costacurta	32	0	23+2	0	3	0	4	0
	DF	(Italy) ITA	Baresi	35	0	31	0	1	0	3	0
	DF	(Italy) ITA	Maldini	33	4	26	4	3	0	4	0
	MF	(Italy) ITA	Donadoni	30	2	23+3	2	1	0	3	0
	MF	(Netherlands) NED	Rijkaard	36	3	29+1	3	2	0	4	0
	MF	(Italy) ITA	Ancelotti	25	1	18+3	1	0	0	4	0
	MF	(Italy) ITA	Evani	30	3	23+1	3	2	0	4	0
	FW	(Netherlands) NED	Gullit	31	8	25+1	7	1	0	4	1
	FW	(Netherlands) NED	Van Basten	34	11	31	11	1	0	2	0
	GK	(Italy) ITA	Rossi	18	-8	9	-3	8	-4	1	-1
	DF	(Italy) ITA	Galli	27	0	19+1	0	6	0	1	0
	MF	(Italy) ITA	Carbone	25	1	17+4	0	2	0	2	1
	FW	(Italy) ITA	Massaro	31	7	12+9	6	6	1	4	0
	DF	(Italy) ITA	Carobbi	16	0	9	0	7	0	0	0
	MF	(Italy) ITA	Stroppa	18	0	7+11	0	0	0	0	0
	FW	(Italy) ITA	Agostini	24	4	7+8	2	8	2	1	0
	FW	(Italy) ITA	Simone	22	6	7+7	4	6	2	2	0
	MF	(Italy) ITA	Gaudenzi	20	0	5+7	0	6	0	2	0
	DF	(Italy) ITA	Nava	9	0	2	0	7	0	0	0
	DF	(Italy) ITA	Costi	9	0	0+2	0	7	0	0	0
	GK	(Italy) ITA	Taibi	0	0	0	0	0	0	0	0
	MF	(Italy) ITA	Salvatori	4	1	0	0	4	1	0	0
	MF	(Italy) ITA	Albertini	2	0	0	0	2	0	0	0
	DF	(Italy) ITA	R. Bandirali	1	0	0	0	1	0	0	0
	FW	(Italy) ITA	C. Borneo	1	1	0	0	1	1	0	0
	MF	(Italy) ITA	D. Corti	1	0	0	0	1	0	0	0

- Source: http://calcio-seriea.net/presenze/1990/1006/

== Sources ==
- RSSSF – Italy 1990/91
