= Ruud Gullit =

Dutch association football player and manager

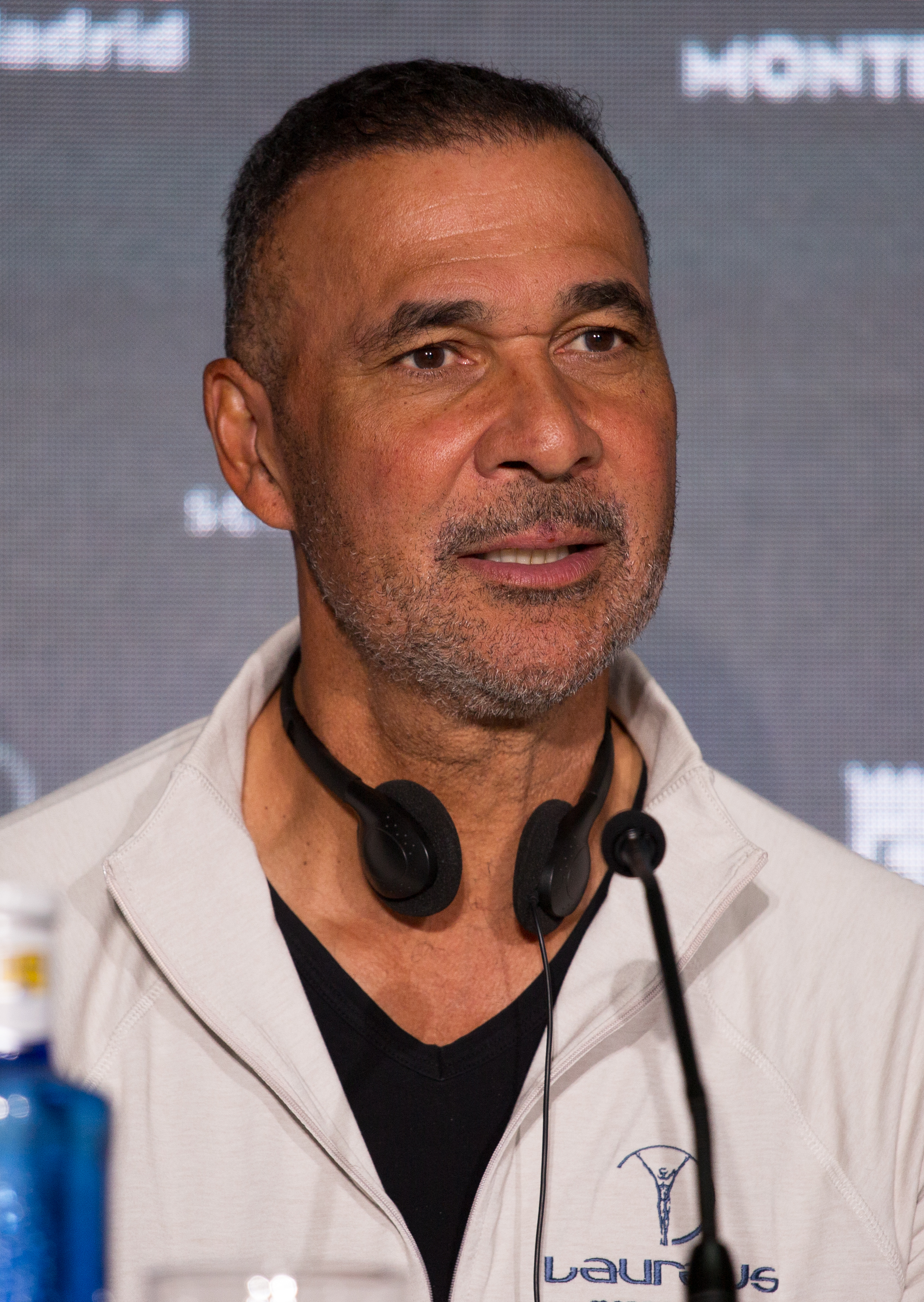
- Gullit in 2024

Personal information
- Full name: Ruud Gullit
- Birth name: Rudi Dil
- Date of birth: 1 September 1962 (age 64)
- Place of birth: Amsterdam, Netherlands
- Height: 1.91 m (6 ft 3 in)
- Position: Midfielder

Youth career
- 1967–1975: ASV Meerboys
- 1975–1979: DWS

Senior career*
Years	Team	Apps	(Gls)
1979–1982	Haarlem	91	(32)
1982–1985	Feyenoord	85	(30)
1985–1987	PSV	68	(46)
1987–1994	AC Milan	125	(38)
1993–1994	→ Sampdoria (loan)	31	(15)
1994–1995	Sampdoria	22	(9)
1995–1998	Chelsea	48	(4)
Total		470	(174)

International career
1979	Netherlands U-21	4	(1)
1981–1994	Netherlands	66	(17)

Managerial career
- 1996–1998: Chelsea (player-manager)
- 1998–1999: Newcastle United
- 2004–2005: Feyenoord
- 2007–2008: LA Galaxy
- 2011: Terek Grozny
Medal record
Men's football
Representing Netherlands
UEFA European Championship
Winner	1988 West Germany
Third place	1992 Sweden
- * Club domestic league appearances and goals

Ruud Gullit (Dutch pronunciation: [ˈryt ˈxʏlɪt]; (Note: In isolation, Gullit is pronounced [ˈɣʏlɪt].) born Rudi Dil on 1 September 1962) is a Dutch former professional footballer and manager. Known for his ability to play multiple positions, he won the 1987 Ballon d'Or and was a long-time Netherlands national team captain, leading them to the UEFA Euro 1988 title.

Gullit moved from PSV to AC Milan in 1987 for a world record transfer fee, joined by compatriots Marco van Basten and, a year later, Frank Rijkaard. They won two Scudetti and two European Cups together, Rijkaard having missed out on the 1987–88 Serie A title. Individual awards would inevitably follow especially for Gullit when, in addition to the Ballon d'Or, he was named World Soccer Player of the Year in 1987 and 1989.

In 1995, Gullit signed for Chelsea and was appointed the club's player-manager a year later. In his managerial debut season, he led Chelsea to FA Cup success, the club's first major title for 26 years, and in doing so, became the first overseas manager to win the FA Cup.

Aside from the victorious Euro 1988 campaign, Gullit also represented the Netherlands at the 1990 FIFA World Cup and Euro 1992. In 2004, Gullit was named one of the Top 125 greatest living footballers as part of FIFA's 100th anniversary celebration.

== Early life ==
Gullit was born as Rudi Dil in Amsterdam to George Gullit, a Surinamese emigrant who arrived in the Netherlands with Frank Rijkaard's father Herman Rijkaard, and Dutch mistress Ria Dil from the Jordaan district of Amsterdam. The Gullit family lived in one split level room on the top floor of a small apartment building. Gullit's father worked as an economics teacher at a local school, his mother as a custodian at the Rijksmuseum.

Gullit developed his football skills in the confines of the Rozendwarsstraat, and street football was instrumental in his formative years. Gullit's first team were the Meerboys, where he joined as a junior in 1970. At the age of ten, however, Gullit moved from the Jordaan to Amsterdam Old West where he played street football alongside Rijkaard. Gullit joined the DWS club after his move, and came to the attention of the Dutch youth team, where he played alongside future full international teammates, Erwin Koeman, Ronald Koeman and Wim Kieft.

It was during his time at DWS that Gullit first took to using his father's surname, rather than his registered surname (from his mother), as he thought Gullit sounded more like a footballer.

== Club career ==
=== HFC Haarlem ===
On 22 September 1978, Gullit signed his first professional contract for HFC Haarlem, then coached by former West Bromwich Albion player Barry Hughes. He made his debut for the club at just 16 years and 11 months old, becoming at the time the youngest player in Eredivisie history. Haarlem finished bottom of the Eredivisie in his first season, but bounced back to win the following season's Eerste Divisie title, where Gullit was named the league's best player.

In the 1981–82 season, Gullit was in fine form as Haarlem finished fourth and qualified for Europe for the only time in their history. In that same season, Gullit scored the goal he would later consider his finest: "Playing against Utrecht I went past four defenders and then the goalkeeper, and scored. It was an unforgettable goal for me." Hughes was so impressed with the young Gullit that he described him as the "Dutch Duncan Edwards".

In total, Gullit made 91 league appearances for Haarlem, scoring 32 goals.

=== Feyenoord ===
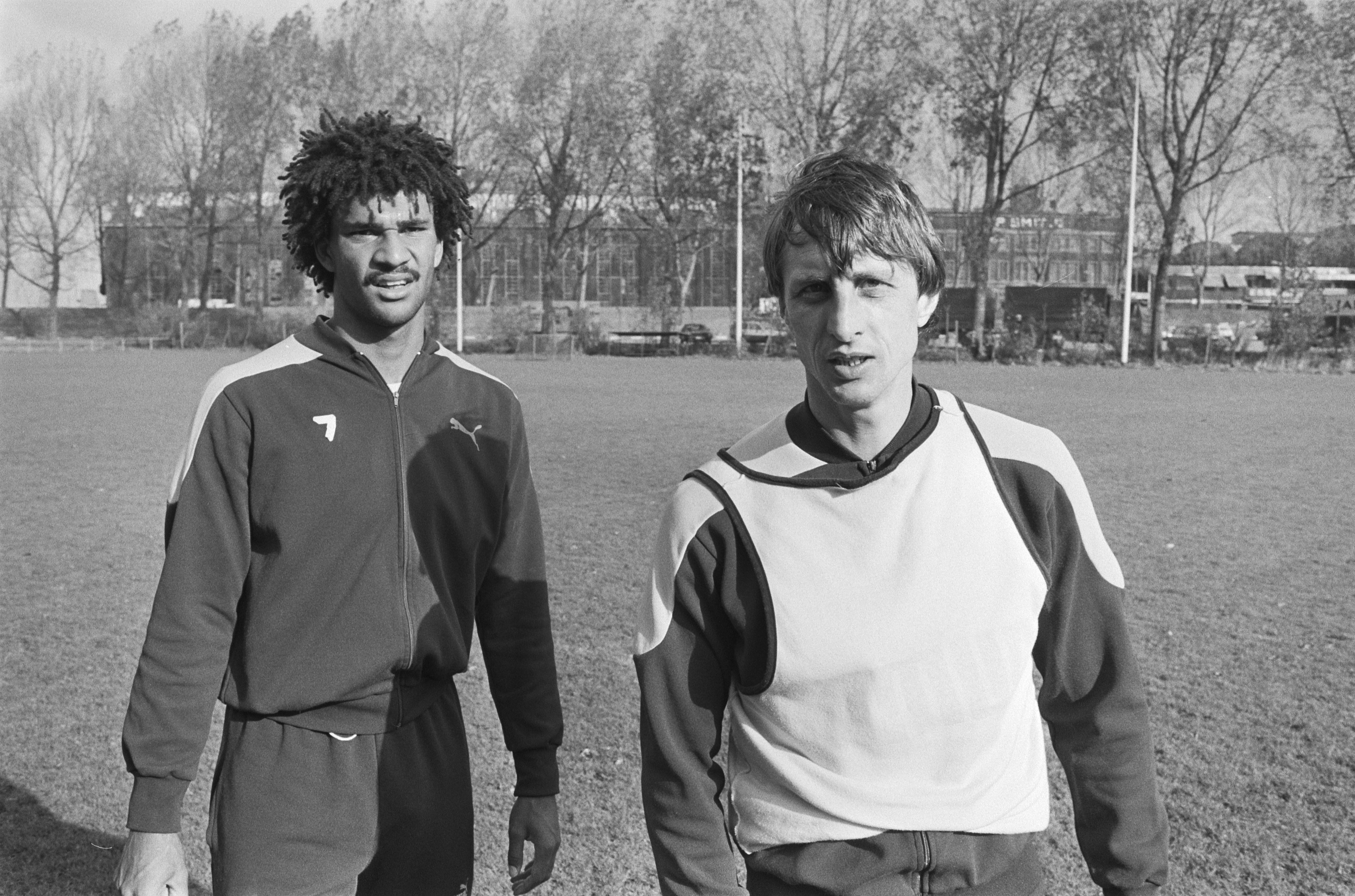
Gullit and teammate Johan Cruyff during a Feyenoord training session in 1983.

The young Gullit was considered as a signing by English sides Arsenal and Ipswich Town, but managers Terry Neill and Bobby Robson turned him down. Neill later said that he considered £30,000 too much for "this wild kid". Gullit therefore moved to Feyenoord in 1982, where he made 85 league appearances, scoring 31 goals. At Feyenoord, Gullit found himself playing in his second season, 1983–84, alongside Johan Cruyff, while the assistant manager was Willem van Hanegem, and they were to leave a lasting impression.

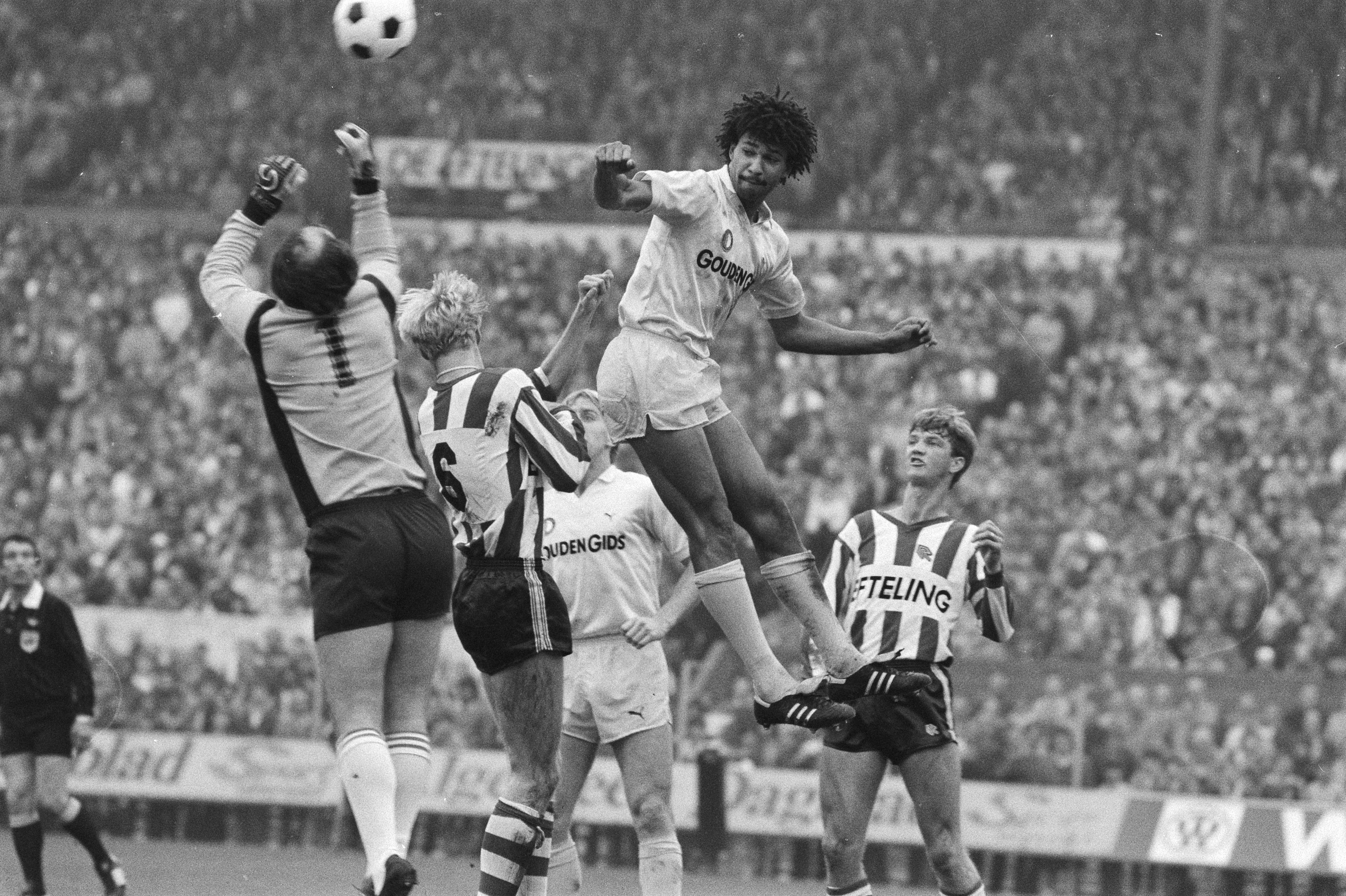
Ruud Gullit of Feyenoord leaps for the ball as Sparta Rotterdam’s Louis van Gaal watches from the right during an Eredivisie match in 1983.

Gullit's first season saw Feyenoord miss out on major honours, but the following year they completed the league and cup double. Gullit was named Dutch Footballer of the Year in recognition of his contribution to Feyenoord's success. At Feyenoord, Gullit occupied an increasingly advanced role in midfield, having played predominantly as a sweeper at Haarlem. While at Feyenoord, Gullit faced racism as manager Thijs Libregts was alleged to have referred to Gullit as "blackie" and criticised him for being lazy, though Libregts defended himself by stating that it was merely a nickname. While playing for Feyenoord at St Mirren in September 1983, he was racially abused and spat on by supporters of the Scottish club. Gullit called it "the saddest night of my life".

=== PSV ===
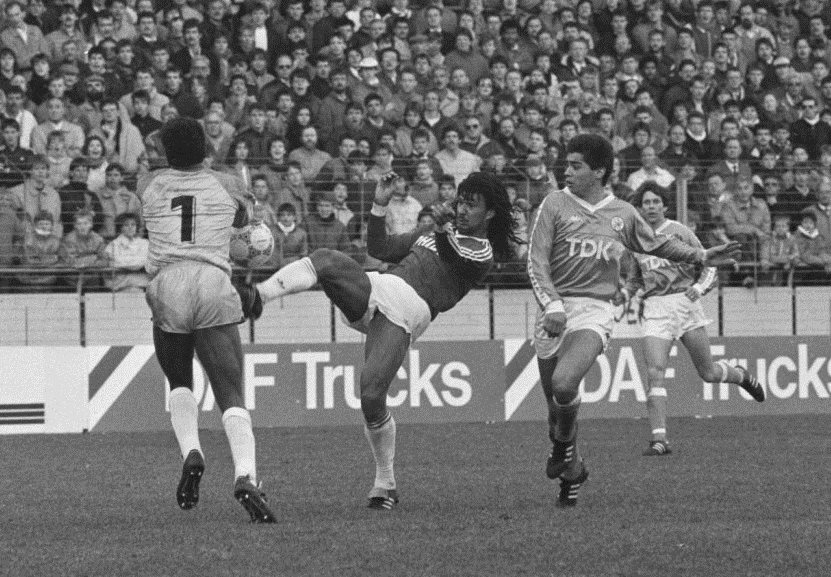
Gullit (in the foreground) during a derby match against Ajax in 1987.

In 1985, Gullit moved to PSV for 1.2 million Dutch guilders and wound up scoring 46 goals in 68 league appearances for the team. Gullit was again named Footballer of the Year in 1986 as he helped PSV capture the Eredivisie crown, a feat they repeated the following year.

=== AC Milan ===
Gullit signed for AC Milan in 1987, paying the then world record transfer fee of 18 million guilders as a replacement for Ray Wilkins. Milan's club president Silvio Berlusconi had an ambition to revive the fortunes of the Italian club which had stagnated after its glory days in the 1960s. Among Gullit's teammates at the club were compatriot van Basten, who came at the same time. Later, they were joined by fellow compatriot, close friend as well as van Basten’s Ajax teammate, Rijkaard. The club also had a young Paolo Maldini, along with a more experienced Franco Baresi. Gullit's exploits with first PSV and then Milan helped him win the Ballon d'Or award in 1987 which he dedicated to Nelson Mandela.

When he first arrived at Milan, Gullit initially struggled to fit in as he spoke no Italian and was new to living in a foreign country. Gullit's first season at Milan, however, saw the club win the Scudetto for the first time in nine years, under coach Arrigo Sacchi. Initially used on the right of an attacking trio alongside van Basten and Pietro Virdis, after van Basten was injured it became a front two. The following season Milan built on their domestic success by adding the European Cup to their list of honours. That performance was followed by a 4–0 victory over Steaua București in the 1989 final, with Gullit scoring two crucial goals. According to Gullit: “The year that we won the Champions League, in the semi-final against Real Madrid I got injured. My meniscus was broken. I got a very quick operation so that I could play the final. The next season when I started to train again, not only my meniscus was damaged but also the cartilage, so for that reason, I couldn't play almost the whole season. It was hard because I was on the edge of maybe not playing football anymore.".

The following year, Milan retained the trophy as they defeated Benfica in the 1990 final. However, serious injuries sustained to the ligaments of his right knee limited Gullit's playing time, and he managed just two domestic games in the 1989–90 season before appearing in the Cup Final.

In 1990–91, Milan's pursuit of a third consecutive European Cup was cut short by Marseille at the quarter-final stage. Having drawn the first leg at the San Siro, Milan trailed to a Chris Waddle goal with little time remaining when the floodlights went out. After a short delay the lighting was restored, but Milan had returned to their dressing room and refused to return to complete the game. UEFA awarded Marseille a 3–0 victory and expelled Milan from all European competitions for the following season.

While Milan continued their domestic dominance by winning the scudetto in both 1991–92 (a season in which they went undefeated) and 1992–93, Gullit's position became an increasingly peripheral one under new coach Fabio Capello. This was illustrated by his omission from the 1993 Champions League final in which Milan lost to Marseille, as under the UEFA rules clubs were only allowed to field three foreigners, which was later abolished after the decision of the Bosman ruling. Gullit: "After my injury, I was not the Ruud Gullit anymore what I was before. I had to adjust myself to a different way of playing football, because of the injury and because I was that much out of the game. I had to adapt my game, but I could deal with it. But of course, the role at Milan was less important than before, because at that moment the rotation system was introduced. So we were only allowed to have three foreigners. So sometimes you couldn't play. So that was also hard. When you are used to playing most of the games and all of a sudden you have to rest, so that was hard.”.

Torino was interested in signing him, with the chairman claiming that an agreement with Milan was likely. Bayern Munich was also in talks with Gullit, but they fell through. Instead, Gullit was loaned to Sampdoria.

=== Sampdoria ===
In 1993, Gullit moved to Sampdoria and led them to victory in the Coppa Italia in the 1993–94 season. He also scored the winner in a 3–2 victory over Milan, one of 15 goals he scored during the league campaign. He returned to Milan and scored in the season-opening 1994 Supercoppa Italiana against Sampdoria, but soon returned to the Genoese club before the midway point of the 1994–95 season, with Alessandro Melli being loaned in the opposite direction as part of the deal. During his time with Sampdoria, Gullit served under future England national team manager Sven-Göran Eriksson and the two developed a strong understanding and mutual respect.

=== Chelsea ===
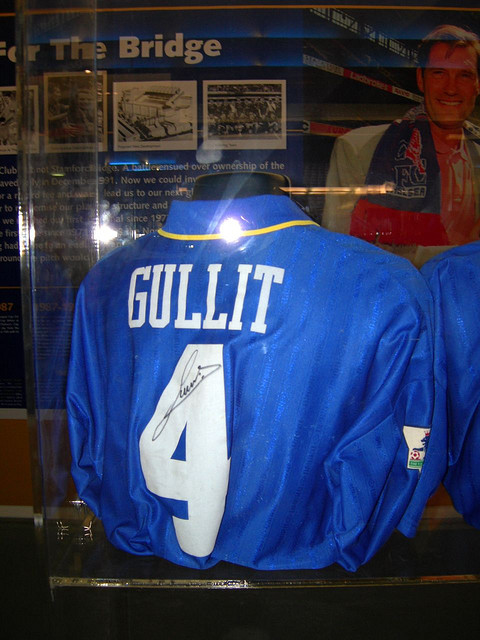
Gullit's #4 Chelsea shirt, on display at the club museum

In July 1995, Gullit signed for Chelsea on a free transfer. Initially played as sweeper by manager Glenn Hoddle with limited success, Gullit was moved to his more familiar role in midfield, where he scored six goals. The signing of Gullit, alongside the likes of Mark Hughes and Dan Petrescu, propelled Chelsea to the semi-final of the FA Cup, although they only finished 11th in the FA Premier League.

Gullit had some difficulties adapting to the style of play at Chelsea: "I would take a difficult ball, control it, make space and play a good ball in front of the right back, except that he didn't want that pass. Eventually Glenn said to me, 'Ruud, it would be better if you do these things in midfield.'" His adjustment, however, was rapid and he ended the season by being named runner-up to Eric Cantona as Footballer of the Year.

Gullit has since often stated in interviews that it was in London he enjoyed his career the most and felt happiest: "Every time I played for Chelsea, I thought, 'Nice game, beautiful stadium, great crowd, I'm playing well.' It was the only time I really had fun." In moving to Chelsea, Gullit played an important part in the "foreign revolution" as numerous high-profile international stars, such as Italian Gianfranco Zola and Dutchman Dennis Bergkamp, joined Chelsea and Arsenal respectively, which helped to increase the Premier League's worldwide profile.

== International career ==
=== 1980s ===
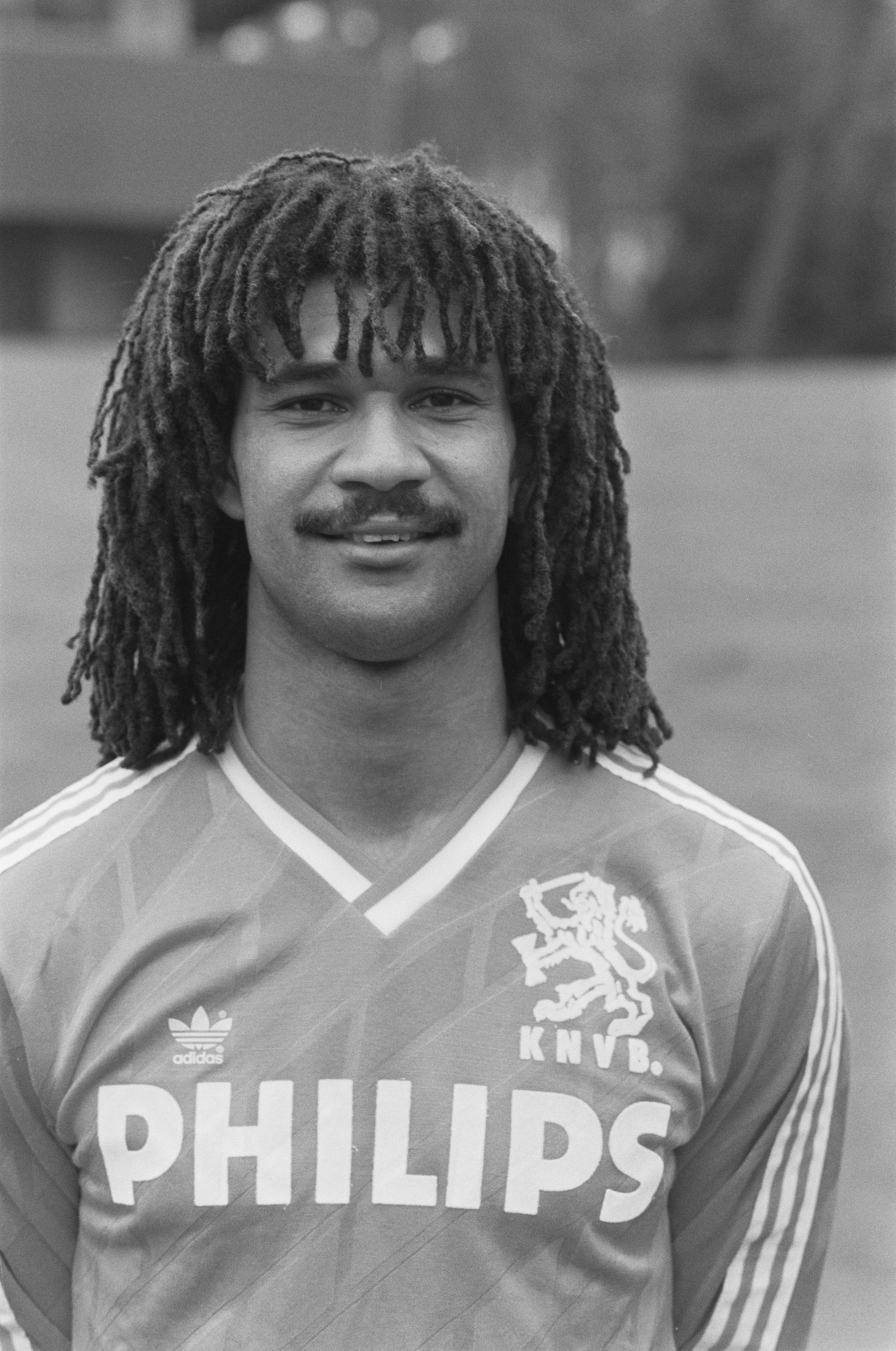
Ruud Gullit with the Netherlands in 1988.

In 1981, on his 19th birthday, Gullit debuted for the Netherlands national team against Switzerland as a substitute, a game the Dutch lost 2–1.

Gullit was one of the key players for the Netherlands as he helped his country win UEFA Euro 1988 under coach Rinus Michels. Having lost their opening game of the tournament to the Soviet Union, the Netherlands beat England and the Republic of Ireland to reach the semi-finals, with Gullit setting up two of van Basten's three goals in the 3–1 win in the second group match against England. After defeating West Germany 2–1 in Hamburg, the Netherlands faced the Soviet Union again in the final. Gullit opened the scoring with a header and van Basten scored a volley from a narrow angle to cap a 2–0 victory. Gullit was thus the first Dutch captain to hold aloft international silverware.

=== 1990s ===
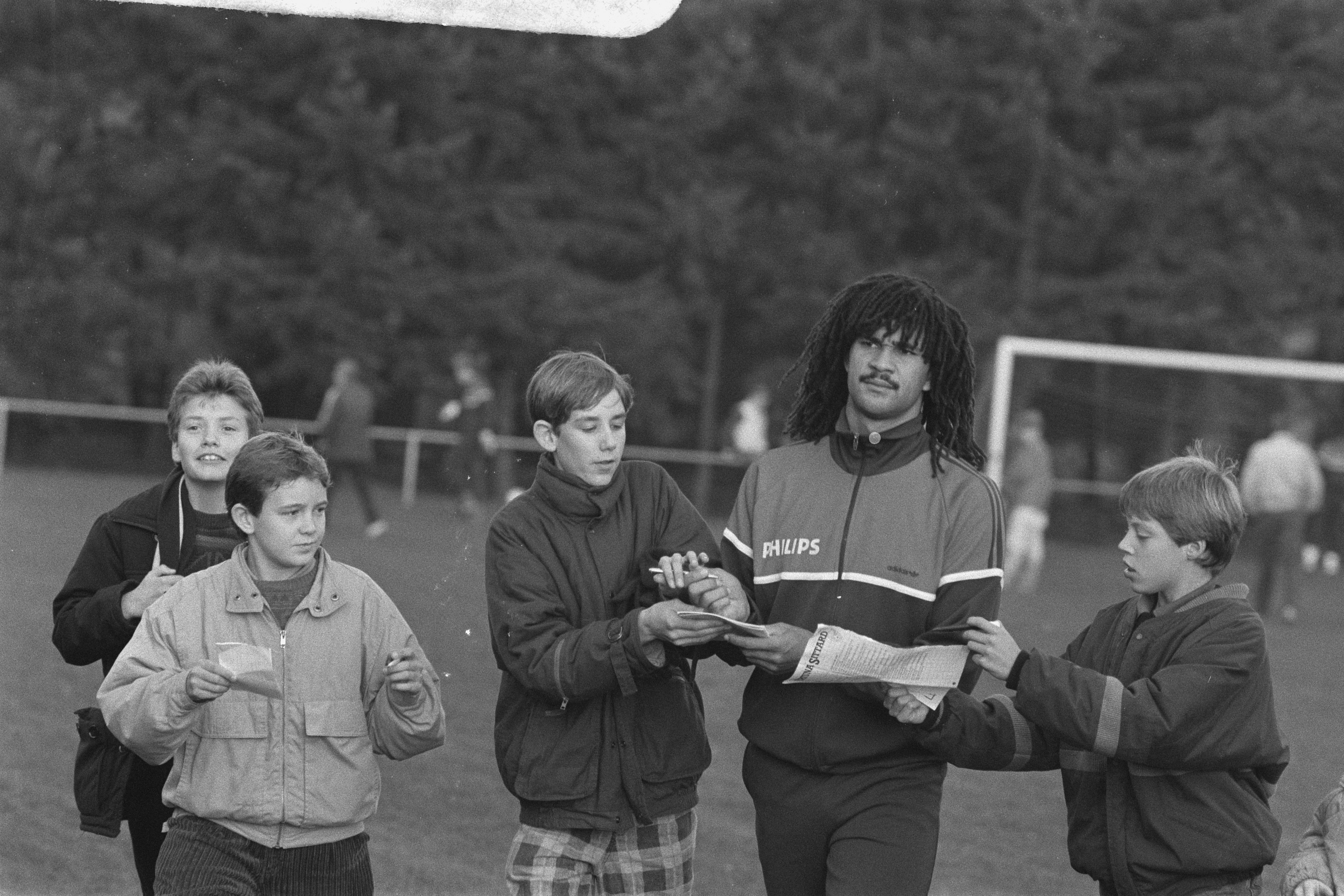
Gullit signing autographs at the national team's training camp

Gullit's knee injuries also hampered his playing time at the 1990 FIFA World Cup, but his dribble and shot against the Republic of Ireland helped the Netherlands qualify for the second round. The Netherlands faced West Germany in a match marred by an altercation between Rijkaard and Rudi Völler. The Germans gained revenge for their defeat at Euro 1988 by beating the Netherlands 2–1 and going on to win the tournament.

At UEFA Euro 1992, Gullit appeared in strong form against Scotland in their opening game of the tournament as he supplied Bergkamp with the only goal of the match. However, after a goalless draw with CIS and beating Germany 3–1, the Netherlands suffered a shock exit on penalties to Denmark in the semi-finals, after a 2–2 draw; during regulation time, Gullit assisted Rijkaard for a late equaliser. The Danish side ended up winning the championship's Henri Delaunay Trophy.

In 1993, Gullit and Netherlands manager Dick Advocaat began what was to be a long-running dispute which ultimately ended Gullit's international career. Advocaat's decision to play Gullit on the right side of midfield in a game against England at Wembley, rather than his usual central position, upset him and this was exacerbated by his substitution for Peter van Vossen. Gullit refused to play for the Netherlands following this but later changed his mind and agreed to return, facing Scotland in May 1994. Shortly before the 1994 World Cup, Gullit walked out of the pre-tournament training camp and would never play international football again.

== Style of play ==
Gullit epitomised the ethos of Total Football, possessing work rate, adeptness in ball-winning, tactical intelligence, skills and physical qualities. Normally utilised as an attacking midfielder or second striker, he was capable of playing anywhere in midfield or along the front line, on either wing or even in the centre, and could also play as a sweeper.

Gullit's foremost attribute was athleticism, being tall, powerful and an excellent jumper. Yet, unusually for a man of his stature, Gullit had outstanding natural balance, poise, technique, dribbling and free kick ability. He was also noted for his mental acuity, creativity, vision and spatial abilities, which helped him score many goals early on and enabled him to play in a deep-lying playmaker role late in his days, where he was known for creating chances for teammates. Beyond his footballing qualities, Gullit also stood out with his leadership and tenacity. Despite his talent, however, he struggled with injuries throughout his career, which later affected his fitness.

Gullit's brilliance prompted Garth Crooks to comment in his 1990 Team of the Week column, "Ruud Gullit is a great player by any standards. He has all the skills. He's not afraid to do things with the ball. And he looks as if he's enjoying every second of it. By my reckoning that's what makes him an even better player than Maradona. Both have the key quality you will find in all the best players: balance. You just can't knock them off the ball. It was the same with Pelé, Beckenbauer and Cruyff."

== Managerial career ==
=== Chelsea ===
In the summer of 1996, when Hoddle left Chelsea to become manager of the England national team, Gullit was appointed as a player-manager becoming the first Dutch manager in the Premier League. Gullit made a promising start to his managerial career when in the first season as a player-manager he guided Chelsea to an FA Cup triumph in 1997, the club's first major trophy in 26 years. In doing so he became the first manager from outside the British Isles and the first black manager to win a major British football trophy. The club also finished at a creditable sixth place in the Premiership.

The following season, with Chelsea in second place in the Premiership and proceeding to the quarter-finals in two cup competitions, he was sacked, allegedly for a disagreement with the club's board over compensation, though Gullit himself disputed this. He was replaced by Gianluca Vialli, a man he had helped to bring to the club, and who went on to guide them to UEFA Cup Winners' Cup and Football League Cup glory over the remainder of the season. Gullit's last appearance as a player came in the first leg of that season's League Cup semi-final against Arsenal, but Gullit was sacked before the second leg. After Gullit's controversial sacking by Chelsea, chairman Ken Bates said of Gullit, "I didn't like his arrogance – in fact I never liked him."

=== Newcastle United ===
In August 1998, Gullit was named manager of Newcastle United two games into the new league season and reached the 1999 FA Cup Final in his first year. Fans remained supportive despite a poor run of results, although well-publicised disagreements with the team's top scorer Alan Shearer and captain Rob Lee did not put him in a favourable light. Gullit refused to assign Lee a squad number, giving Lee's number 7 to new signing Kieron Dyer. In a match between Newcastle and local rivals Sunderland following the latter's return to the Premiership, Gullit left the usual starting strikers Shearer and Duncan Ferguson on the bench. Newcastle lost 2–1, and Gullit resigned three days later, five games into the 1999–2000 season.

=== Feyenoord ===
Before the start of the 2004–05 season, Gullit took charge of Feyenoord, quitting at the end of that season without winning any trophies, being replaced by Erwin Koeman. Feyenoord had finished a disappointing fourth in the Eredivisie, behind Ajax, PSV and AZ.

=== Los Angeles Galaxy ===
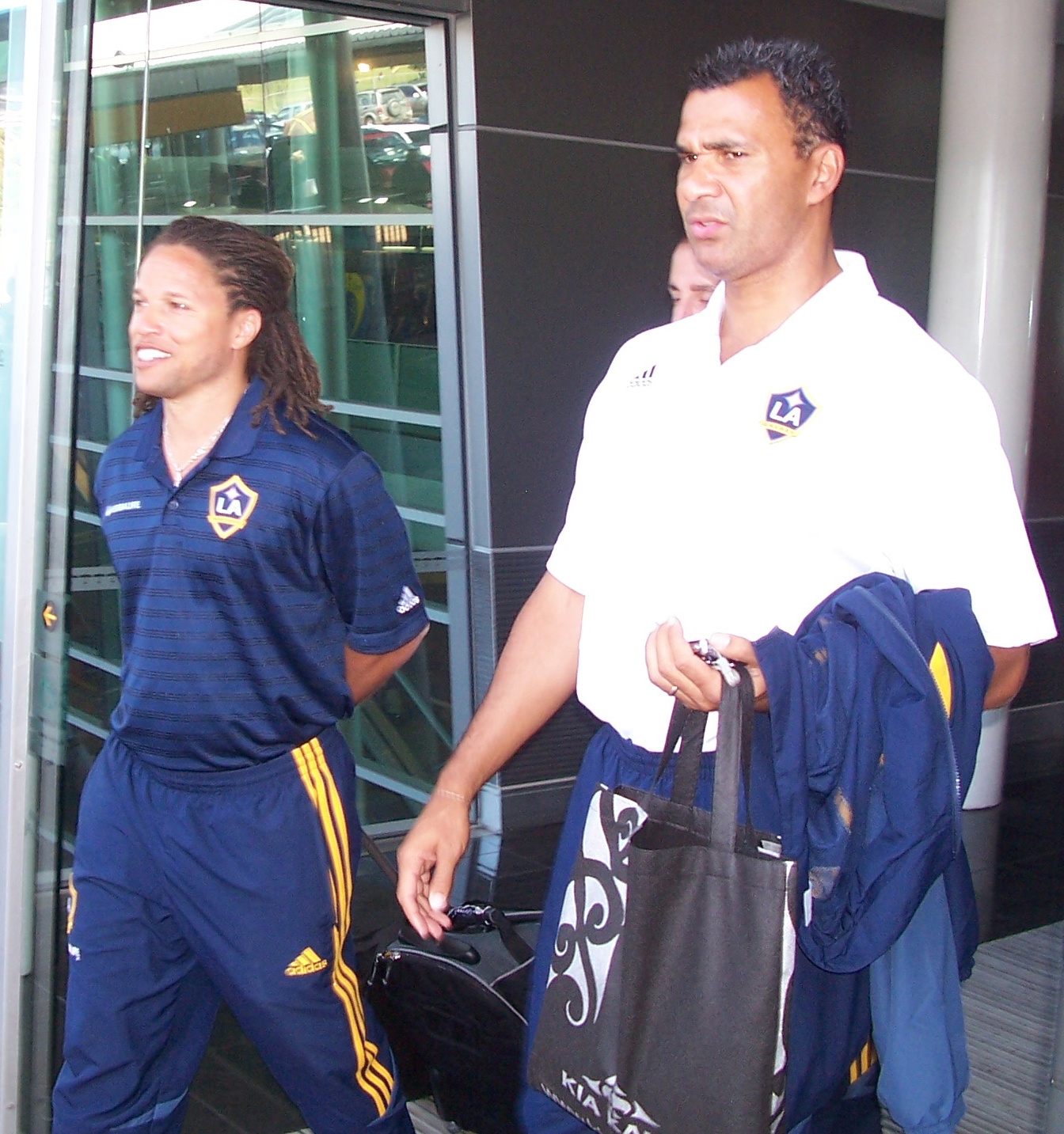
Gullit with Cobi Jones at Galaxy

On 8 November 2007, Gullit became head coach for the LA Galaxy, signing a three-year contract. His US$2 million per year salary was the highest ever given to a Major League Soccer (MLS) head coach. Gullit arrived as replacement for Frank Yallop who was let go after Galaxy failed to make the 2007 MLS playoffs despite having record signing David Beckham on the roster.

Gullit's time with Galaxy was troublesome. Not well-versed in the intricacies and specifics of the MLS such as salary cap and draft rules, the Dutchman did not adapt well to the North American league. After losing 0–4 in the season opener, Gullit clashed with midfielder Peter Vagenas, who criticized him for neglecting set-play practice during training.

As the season progressed, Gullit clashed with several players, including Landon Donovan and Abel Xavier; the latter criticized Gullit's managerial style and said he did not have respect for most of the players. It was later reported that Gullit's appointment had been made in controversial fashion as Galaxy general manager, Alexi Lalas, had been bypassed in the process, with the decision being led by David Beckham's advisers: his management company 19 Entertainment and his personal manager Terry Byrne.

On 11 August 2008, Gullit resigned as coach of the Galaxy, citing personal reasons. This came following a seven-game winless streak. General manager Lalas was fired at the same time.

=== Terek Grozny ===
On 18 January 2011, Russian Premier League side Terek Grozny announced that Gullit had agreed to sign a year-and-a-half contract and become the head coach for the Chechen side. Upon signing, Gullit told Sovetsky Sport, "I'd like to believe that I can bring joy into the lives of the Chechen people through football... Of course, I won't deny that I'm getting lots of money from Terek." Gullit left the club on 14 June 2011.

== Media career ==
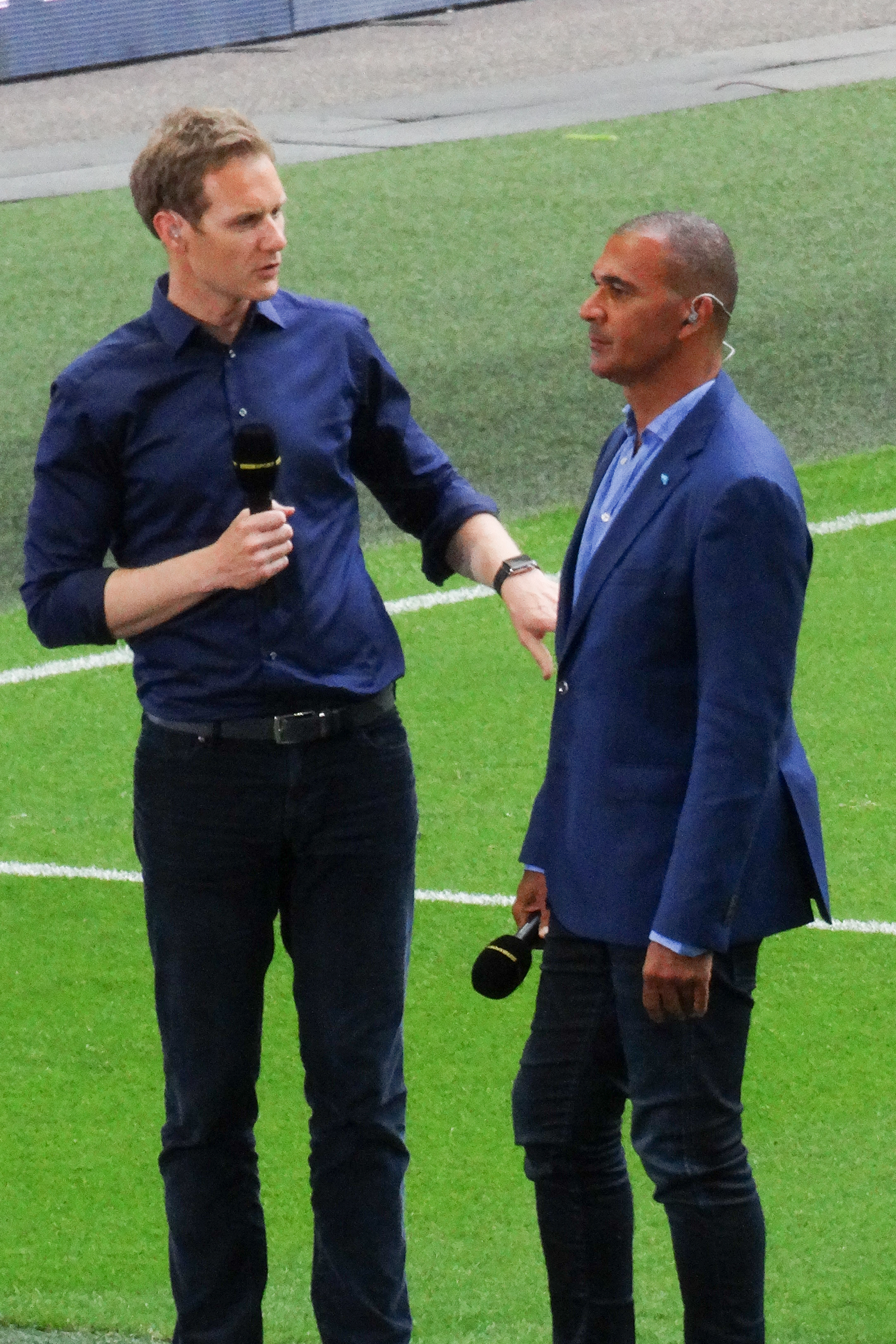
Gullit in his role as a BBC pundit during the 2017 FA Cup Final

In 1988, together with the reggae band Revelation Time, Gullit had a No. 3 chart hit with the anti-apartheid song "South Africa" in the Dutch Top 40. Previously, he had a modest hit in 1984 with the song "Not the Dancing Kind". Gullit also joined his band in front of 3,000 people at concerts in Italy, in the year he made a move to AC Milan.

After his spell at Newcastle, Gullit spent several years working as a football commentator, having previously coined the term "sexy football" during his spell as a BBC pundit for Euro 1996 while still playing professionally for Chelsea. Gullit used the term to describe teams, such as Portugal at that tournament, who played attractive football with an emphasis on the defense-penetrating pass-and-move game.

By 2006, Gullit had a talk show on Dutch TV, where he interviewed, amongst others, Nelson Mandela. When Gullit was named winner of the Ballon d'Or in 1987, he dedicated the award to the then-imprisoned Nelson Mandela. Gullit has since said in interviews that he met Mandela after he was released, and that Mandela had said to him, "Ruud, I have lots of friends now. When I was on the inside, you were one of the few."

In 2007, Gullit recalled, "Four months ago I visited Robben Island and met three guys who were cell-mates of Nelson Mandela. They remembered me dedicating my award in 1987 to Mandela and they said they couldn't believe what I had done, and were sure the football authorities would withdraw the award. That's what apartheid did to them, it made them believe injustice was a normal part of life."

Gullit also appeared as a pundit for ITV during the 2006 World Cup and worked as an analyst for Champions League games on Sky Sports and Al Jazeera Sports. During the 2010 FIFA World Cup, Gullit worked as a studio analyst alongside former players Jürgen Klinsmann and Steve McManaman for ESPN. He subsequently worked as an analyst for Al Jazeera Sports during Euro 2012 alongside Glenn Hoddle and Terry Venables, among others.

In 2013, Gullit and many other former footballers were brought into EA Sports's FIFA 14 as "Legends" cards in FIFA Ultimate Team; his card is one of the highest rated in the game.

In 2014, Gullit joined BBC's Match of the Day as a studio pundit and first appeared during the 2014–15 season.

Gullit embarked on the Heineken Champions League Trophy Tour in 2016 where he visited Vietnam with Carles Puyol. For the 2022 World Cup, Gullit worked for BeIN Sports and continued to do so during the UEFA Champions League coverage for the 2022–23 season.

== Personal life ==
Gullit is a Feyenoord supporter. Gullit was married to Yvonne de Vries from 1984 to 1991, with whom he had two daughters. From 1994 to 2000 he was married to Italian Christina Pensa, with whom he also had two children. From 2000 to 2012 he was married to Estelle Cruyff, a niece of Johan Cruyff. He also had two children with her. Their son Maxim Gullit played professional football and had a contract with SC Cambuur. Gullit spends his free time playing golf.

== Career statistics ==
=== Club ===
Appearances and goals by club, season and competition
Club	Season	League			National cup (Note: Includes KNVB Cup, Coppa Italia, FA Cup)		League cup (Note: Includes Football League Cup)		Continental		Other		Total	
Club	Season	Division	Apps	Goals	Apps	Goals	Apps	Goals	Apps	Goals	Apps	Goals	Apps	Goals
HFC Haarlem	1979–80	Eredivisie	24	4	0	0	—		—		—		24	4
HFC Haarlem	1980–81	Eerste Divisie	36	14	5	2	—		—		—		41	16
HFC Haarlem	1981–82	Eredivisie	31	14	4	2	—		—		—		35	16
HFC Haarlem	Total		91	32	9	4	—		—		—		100	36
Feyenoord	1982–83	Eredivisie	33	8	2	1	—		—		—		35	9
Feyenoord	1983–84	Eredivisie	33	15	8	9	—		4 (Note: Appearance(s) in UEFA Cup)	1	—		45	25
Feyenoord	1984–85	Eredivisie	19	7	2	0	—		2 (Note: Appearance(s) in European Cup)	0	—		23	7
Feyenoord	Total		85	30	12	10	—		6	1	—		103	41
PSV	1985–86	Eredivisie	34	24	2	3	—		2	0	—		38	27
PSV	1986–87	Eredivisie	34	22	3	4	—		0	0	—		37	26
PSV	Total		68	46	5	7	—		2	0	—		75	53
AC Milan	1987–88	Serie A	29	9	6	3	—		4	1	—		39	13
AC Milan	1988–89	Serie A	19	5	1	2	—		8	4	0	0	28	11
AC Milan	1989–90	Serie A	2	0	0	0	—		1	0	0	0	3	0
AC Milan	1990–91	Serie A	26	7	1	0	—		4	1	3 (Note: Two appearances and one goal in European Super Cup, one appearance in Intercontinental Cup)	1	34	9
AC Milan	1991–92	Serie A	26	7	1	1	—		—		—		27	8
AC Milan	1992–93	Serie A	15	7	6	4	—		4	0	1 (Note: Appearance(s) in Supercoppa Italiana)	0	26	11
AC Milan	1994–95	Serie A	8	3	2	0	—		3 (Note: Appearances in UEFA Champions League)	0	1	1	14	4
AC Milan	Total		125	39	17	10	—		24	6	5	2	171	56
Sampdoria (loan)	1993–94	Serie A	31	15	10	2	—		—		—		41	17
Sampdoria	1994–95	Serie A	22	9	—		—		—		—		22	9
Sampdoria	Total		53	24	10	2	—		—		—		63	26
Chelsea	1995–96	Premier League	31	3	7	3	2	0	—		—		40	6
Chelsea	1996–97	Premier League	11	1	1	0	1	0	—		—		13	1
Chelsea	1997–98	Premier League	6	0	0	0	4	0	0	0	0	0	10	0
Chelsea	Total		48	4	8	3	7	0	0	0	0	0	63	7
Career total			470	175	61	36	7	0	32	7	5	2	575	219

=== International ===
Appearances and goals by national team and year
National team	Year	Apps	Goals
Netherlands	1981	1	0
Netherlands	1982	5	1
Netherlands	1983	6	4
Netherlands	1984	4	0
Netherlands	1985	4	0
Netherlands	1986	6	1
Netherlands	1987	6	5
Netherlands	1988	8	2
Netherlands	1989	2	0
Netherlands	1990	9	1
Netherlands	1991	4	1
Netherlands	1992	8	2
Netherlands	1993	2	0
Netherlands	1994	1	0
Total		66	17

Scores and results list the Netherlands' goal tally first, score column indicates score after each Gullit goal.

List of international goals scored by Ruud Gullit
No.	Date	Venue	Opponent	Score	Result	Competition
1	22 September 1982	De Kuip, Rotterdam, Netherlands	Republic of Ireland	2–0	2–1	UEFA Euro 1984 qualification
2	7 September 1983	Stadion Oosterpark, Groningen, Netherlands	Iceland	2–0	3–0	UEFA Euro 1984 qualification
3	12 October 1983	Dalymount Park, Dublin, Republic of Ireland	Republic of Ireland	1–2	3–2	UEFA Euro 1984 qualification
4	12 October 1983	Dalymount Park, Dublin, Republic of Ireland	Republic of Ireland	3–2	3–2	UEFA Euro 1984 qualification
5	16 November 1983	De Kuip, Rotterdam, Netherlands	Spain	2–1	2–1	UEFA Euro 1984 qualification
6	21 December 1986	Tsirion Stadium, Limassol, Cyprus	Cyprus	1–0	2–0	UEFA Euro 1988 qualification
7	21 January 1987	Camp Nou, Barcelona, Spain	Spain	1–0	1–1	Friendly
8	29 April 1987	De Kuip, Rotterdam, Netherlands	Hungary	1–0	2–0	UEFA Euro 1988 qualification
9	14 October 1987	Górnik Stadium, Zabrze, Poland	Poland	1–0	2–0	UEFA Euro 1988 qualification
10	14 October 1987	Górnik Stadium, Zabrze, Poland	Poland	2–0	2–0	UEFA Euro 1988 qualification
11	28 October 1987	De Kuip, Rotterdam, Netherlands	Cyprus	2–0	8–0	UEFA Euro 1988 qualification
12	25 June 1988	Olympiastadion, Munich, Germany	Soviet Union	1–0	2–0	UEFA Euro 1988
13	14 September 1988	Olympic Stadium, Amsterdam, Netherlands	Wales	1–0	1–0	1990 FIFA World Cup qualification
14	21 June 1990	Stadio La Favorita, Palermo, Italy	Republic of Ireland	1–0	1–1	1990 FIFA World Cup
15	17 April 1991	De Kuip, Rotterdam, Netherlands	Finland	2–0	2–0	UEFA Euro 1992 qualification
16	27 May 1992	De Baandert, Sittard-Geleen, Netherlands	Austria	3–1	3–2	Friendly
17	16 December 1992	İnönü Stadium, Istanbul, Turkey	Turkey	2–0	3–1	1994 FIFA World Cup qualification

== Managerial statistics ==
All competitive league games (league and domestic cup) and international matches (including friendlies) are included.

As of 2 May 2015

Team	Nat	Year(s)	Record				
Team	Nat	Year(s)	G	W	D	L	Win %
Chelsea	(England)	1996–1998	83	41	18	24	49.40
Newcastle United	(England)	1998–1999	52	18	14	20	34.62
Feyenoord	(Netherlands)	2004–2005	45	25	7	13	55.56
LA Galaxy	(United States)	2007–2008	19	6	5	8	31.58
Terek Grozny	(Russia)	2011	13	3	3	7	23.08
Career total			212	93	47	72	43.87

== Honours ==
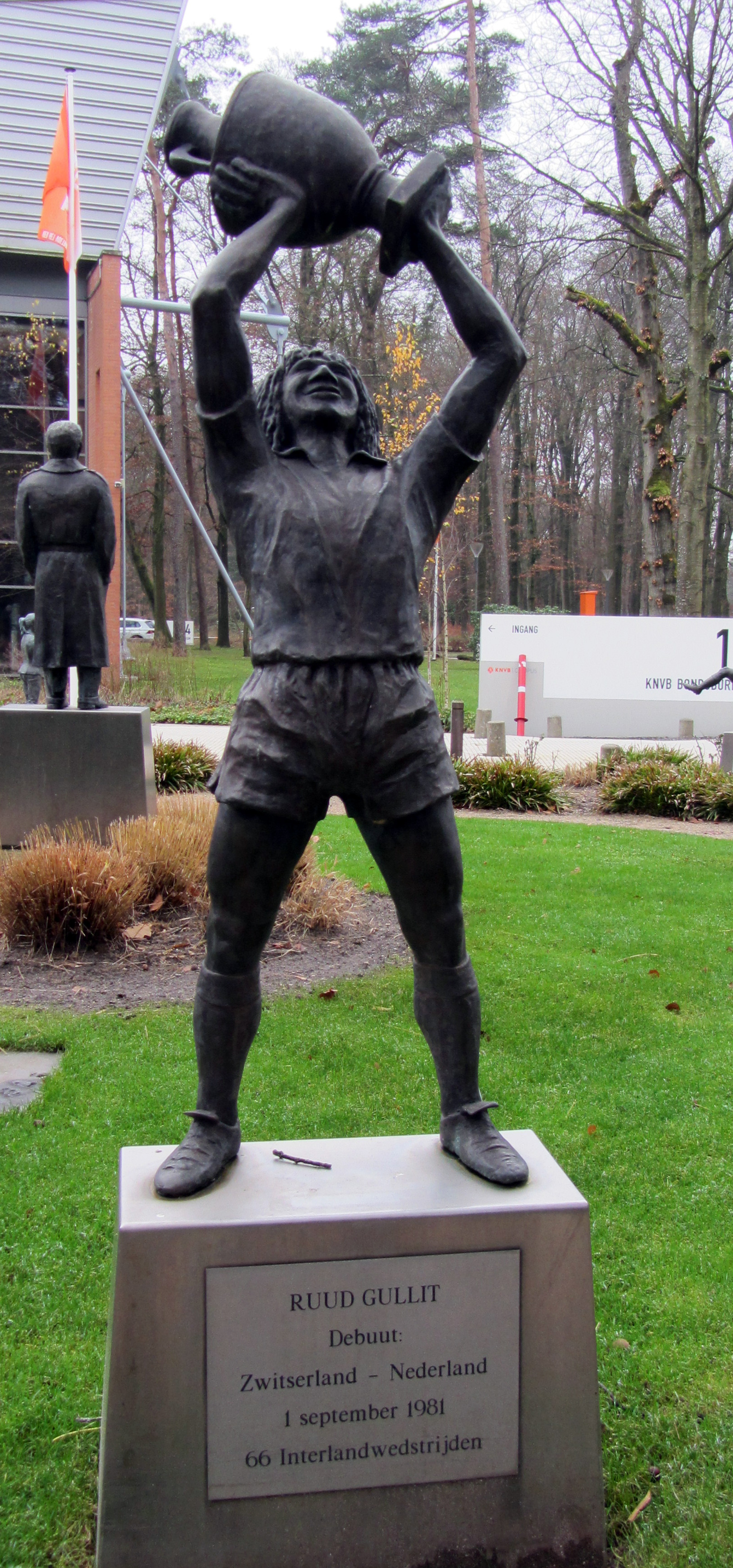
Statue of Ruud Gullit at the KNVB Campus in Zeist, Netherlands

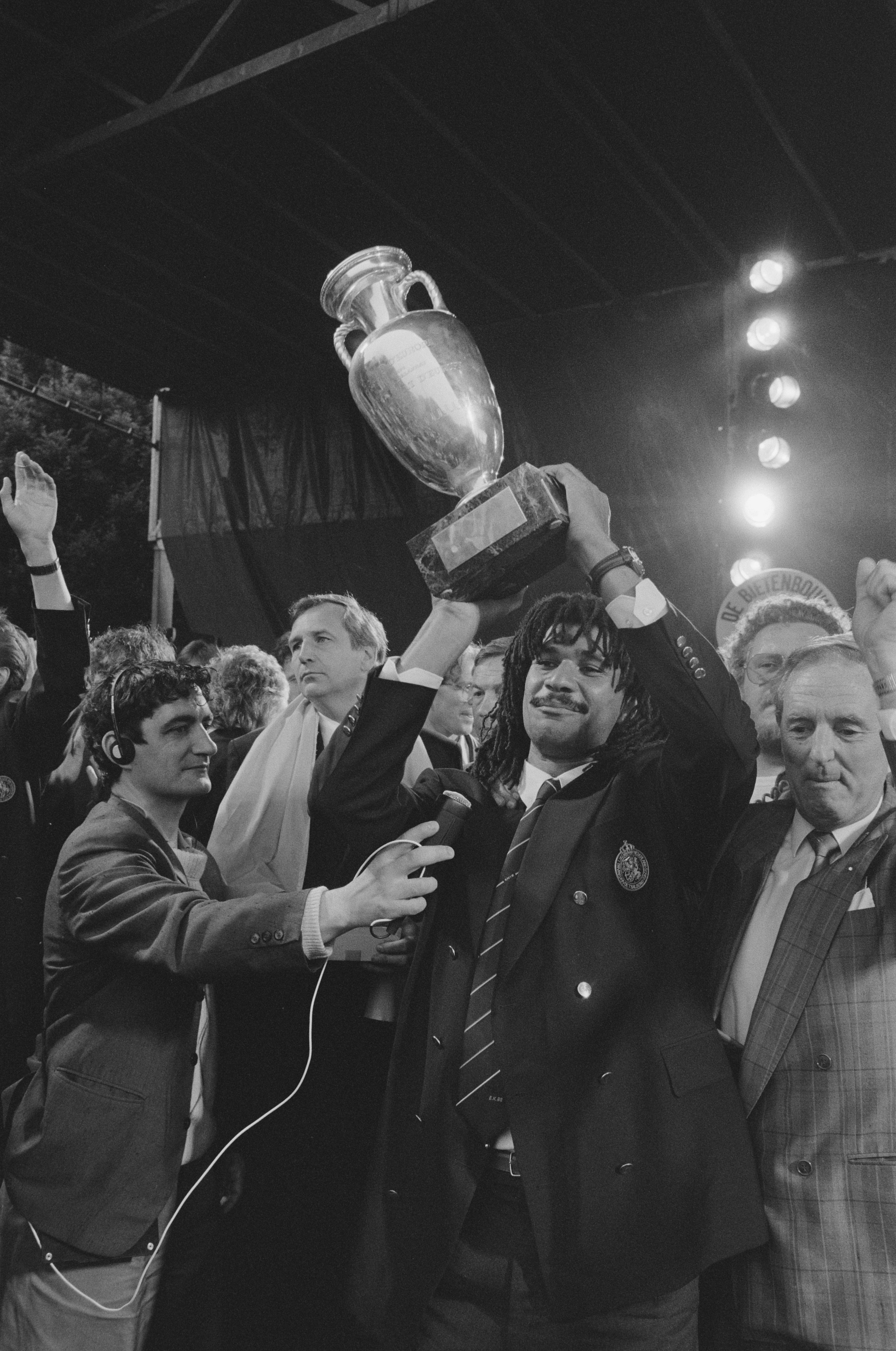
Gullit lifting the UEFA Euro trophy on stage at Museumplein in 1988.

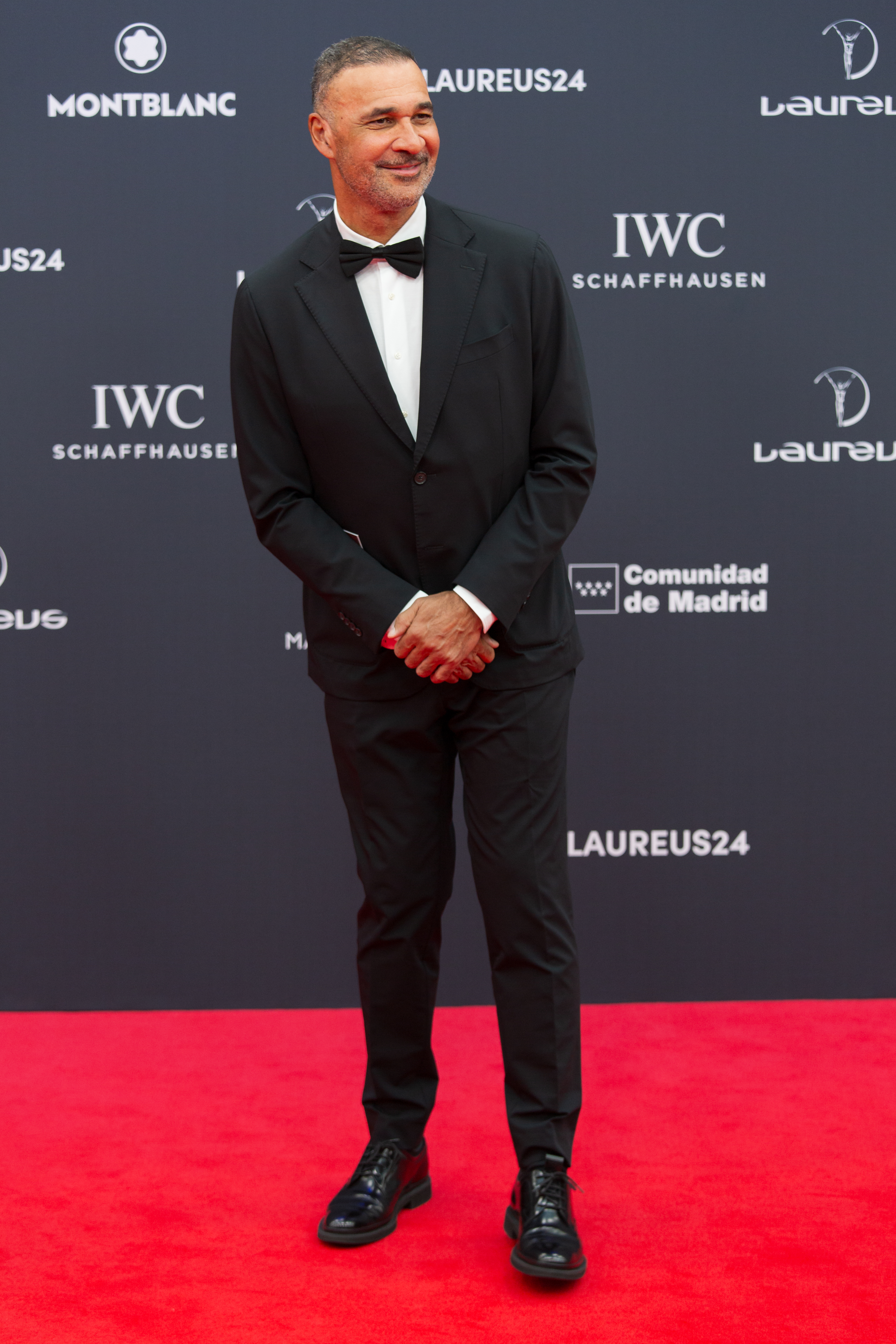
Gullit at the 25th Laureus World Sports Awards in 2024.

=== Player ===
HFC Haarlem

- Eerste Divisie: 1980–81

Feyenoord

- Eredivisie: 1983–84
- KNVB Cup: 1983–84

PSV

- Eredivisie: 1985–86, 1986–87

AC Milan

- Serie A: 1987–88, 1991–92, 1992–93
- Supercoppa Italiana: 1992, 1994
- European Cup: 1988–89, 1989–90
- UEFA Super Cup: 1989, 1990
- Intercontinental Cup: 1989, 1990

Sampdoria

- Coppa Italia: 1993–94

Chelsea

- FA Cup: 1996–97

Netherlands

- UEFA European Championship: 1988

=== Manager ===
Chelsea

- FA Cup: 1996–97

Newcastle United

- FA Cup runner-up: 1998–99

Individual

- Dutch Footballer of the Year: 1984, 1986
- Dutch Golden Shoe: 1986
- Dutch Sportsman of the Year: 1987
- Ballon d'Or: 1987; runner-up: 1988
- World Soccer Magazine World Footballer of the Year: 1987, 1989
- Onze de Onze: 1987, 1988, 1989
- Onze d'Argent: 1988, 1989
- UEFA European Championship Team of the Tournament: 1988, 1992
- World XI: 1991
- Premier League PFA Team of the Year: 1995–96
- Chelsea Player of the Year: 1996
- FIFA 100
- UEFA Golden Jubilee Poll: #13
- Golden Foot: 2011, as football legend
- AC Milan Hall of Fame
- The Best of The Best – Player of the Century: Top 50
- World Soccer: The 100 Greatest Footballers of All Time
- FAI International Football Awards – International Personality: 2008
- IFFHS Legends
- Italian Football Hall of Fame: 2017

== Discography ==
=== Albums ===
- Orange Reggae (1988), Philips

=== Singles and EPs ===
- Not The Dancing Kind (1984), Warner Elektra Atlantic
- South Africa (feat. Revelation Time) (1988), Phonogram

== Published works ==
- Gullit, Ruud (1998). My Autobiography. Random House UK. ISBN 978-0-7126-7940-4.
- Gullit, Ruud (2016). How to Watch Soccer. Penguin Books, New York. ISBN 978-0-1431-3074-1.
- Gullit, Ruud (2017). Non guardare la palla. Che cos'è (davvero) il calcio (in Italian). Piemme. ISBN 978-8-8566-5732-6.
