= Giandomenico =

Giandomenico is a given name. Notable people with the given name include:

- Giandomenico Boncompagni, a.k.a. Gianni Boncompagni, (1932–2017), Italian television, radio presenter, director, writer, and lyricist
- Giandomenico Costi (born 1969), Italian footballer
- Giandomenico De Marchis (1893–1967), Italian sculptor
- Giandomenico Facchina (1826–1903), Italian mosaic artist
- Giandomenico Majone (born 1932), Italian scholar of political science
- Giandomenico Martoretta (1515–1560s?), Italian Renaissance composer
- Giandomenico Mesto (born 1982), Italian footballer
- Giandomenico Picco (1948–2024), a.k.a. Gianni Picco, Italian diplomat
- Giandomenico Ravera, a.k.a. Gianni Ravera, (1920-1986), Italian singer, impresario, and record producer
- Giandomenico Salvadori (born 1992), Italian cross-country skier
- Giandomenico Spinola (1580–1646), Italian cardinal

== See also ==
- Gianni
