= Andrea Fortunato =

Italian footballer (1971–1995)

Personal information
- Date of birth: 26 July 1971
- Place of birth: Salerno, Italy
- Date of death: 25 April 1995 (aged 23)
- Place of death: Perugia, Italy
- Height: 1.78 m (5 ft 10 in)
- Position: Left-back

Youth career
- Como

Senior career*
Years	Team	Apps	(Gls)
1989–1991	Como	43	(0)
1991	Genoa	0	(0)
1991–1992	→ Pisa (loan)	25	(0)
1992–1993	Genoa	33	(3)
1993–1995	Juventus	27	(1)

International career
1993	Italy	1	(0)
- * Club domestic league appearances and goals

Andrea Fortunato (Italian pronunciation: [anˈdrɛːa fortuˈnaːto]; 26 July 1971 – 25 April 1995) was an Italian footballer who played as a left-back. Fortunato was one of Italy's most promising prospects in the late 1980s and early 1990s, and he enjoyed a successful but short spell in Italian football, before contracting leukaemia; he died in April 1995. Throughout his club career, he played for Como, Pisa, Genoa, and Juventus, while at international level he represented the Italy national team on one occasion in 1993.

== Early life ==
Fortunato was born into a middle-class family in Salerno; his father, Giuseppe, was a cardiologist, while his mother, Lucia, was a librarian; he also had a brother and a sister. As a youngster, he swam and played water polo, in addition to football. He began playing football with the Como youth side at the age of 13, although his parents also insisted that he complete his high school diploma in accounting, in case his footballing career turned to be unsuccessful.

== Career ==
=== Como, Genoa, and Pisa ===
Fortunato started his professional career as a left-back with the Como first team in 1988, at the age of 17, making his Serie B (the second division of the Italian football league system) debut with the club on 29 October 1989, in a 1–0 home win against Cosenza. During the 1989–90 Serie B league, the young player from Salerno played 16 times in what was his first season, which saw Como relegated to Serie C1. He soon established himself in the team's starting line-up the following season, making 27 appearances in the league, as Como narrowly missed out on promotion to Serie B, losing out in the playoff to Venezia. Fortunato's consistent performances caught the eye of bigger Italian clubs, most notably Genoa, the club who signed Fortunato in 1991; however, his limited opportunities with the club, due to the presence of the more experienced Branco in his role, led to an argument with Osvaldo Bagnoli's assistant manager Sergio Maddè. As a result, Fortunato was labelled as an "arrogant hothead", and was immediately loaned out to Pisa for the 1991–92 Serie B season, where he made 25 appearances.

After an impressive spell with Pisa, Fortunato returned to Genoa, where he made his Serie A (Italy's top flight) debut on 6 September 1992, in a 1–1 away draw against Fiorentina. He teamed up with right-back Christian Panucci, another promising Italian full-back, and together they formed a formidable defensive young partnership. In the 1992–93 Serie A league, Fortunato made 33 appearances and scored 3 goals, including the equaliser in a 2–2 home draw against eventual champions Milan, which helped Genoa avoid relegation.

=== Juventus and international debut ===
Fortunato's performances with Genoa during the 1992–93 season caught the attention of Juventus boss Giovanni Trapattoni, who brought the promising youngster to the Turin club the following season for 12 billion Lire. The left-back was an instant hit and was awarded the number 3 shirt, which had belonged to former Juventus full-back Antonio Cabrini during the 1980s.

Fortunato started the 1993–94 Serie A league (his first season with Juventus) strongly, and soon became known for his endless running along the flank and his fine left foot, which he would use to provide accurate crosses for the likes of forwards Roberto Baggio, Fabrizio Ravanelli, and Gianluca Vialli. His most important attribute was that he loved being a team player, both on and off the pitch. His charm and great personality won the hearts of many, so much so that former Italy coach Arrigo Sacchi described him as "a revelation of Italian football", and called the Juventus star to make his one and only international appearance in a World Cup qualifier against Estonia, on 22 September 1993, in Tallinn. Fortunato took Paolo Maldini's place and played alongside national team captain and veteran Franco Baresi in a game that Italy won 3–0. The left-back showed striking similarities to Maldini, and he was initially even in Sacchi's plans for the 1994 FIFA World Cup.

=== Illness and death ===
During the second half of the 1993–94 season, Fortunato suffered an unexplained loss of form and struggled to complete matches due to a lack of energy; he was subsequently dropped from the national team after doctors announced that he had a rare form of leukaemia in May 1994. Fortunato initially struggled to find a suitable bone marrow donor, and underwent chemotherapy in a hospital in Turin and an unsuccessful bone marrow transplant from his sister, Paola; he was later transferred to a hospital in Perugia, and after a second bone marrow transplant from his father, he appeared to have made a full recovery. For the 1994–95 Serie A season, he was included in the Turin club's roster, and was even called up to join the team by new coach Marcello Lippi for Juventus's clash with Sampdoria in Genoa on 26 February 1995, although he later watched his teammates from the stands.

Although his condition initially seemed to be improving well, Fortunato came down with a flu and later caught pneumonia, from which he was unable to recover; he died in a hospital in Perugia on 25 April 1995, the eve of Italy's game against Lithuania in Vilnius. The Italy national team observed a minute of silence in his honour prior to the match, and also dedicated the 1–0 victory to him. His funeral took place on 27 April in his hometown of Salerno. That season, Lippi's Juventus went on to win their 23rd league title (scudetto), dedicated to Fortunato, known as "Fortunato's Scudetto". Juventus also won the Coppa Italia and the Supercoppa Italiana that year, and reached the UEFA Cup final. In total, Fortunato made 27 league appearances for Juventus, all of which came during the 1993–94 season, scoring one goal for the club, which came in a 3–1 away defeat to Lazio on 12 December 1993, in Serie A.

== Style of play ==
Fortunato was known for his pace, stamina, determination, and tactical intelligence as a footballer, which enabled him to cover the left flank and win back possession. He had a good left foot and was known for his crossing accuracy from the touchline, and ability to beat opponents, make attacking runs down the wing, and deliver balls to teammates in the area. Although he played at left-back throughout his professional career, or as an attacking wing-back, he was a versatile player, who started out playing as a centre-forward and as a left midfielder in his youth, and was also capable of playing as a central or defensive midfielder, as a centre-back, or as a sweeper. He was regarded as a promising young left-back of his generation in Italy; his playing style was frequently compared with that of former Juventus full-back Antonio Cabrini. In addition to his footballing skills, Fortunato was also known for his calm composure and friendly personality, in spite of his reserved character.

== Honours ==
=== Club ===
Juventus

- Serie A: 1994–95 (posthumous)
- Coppa Italia: 1994–95 (posthumous)
