= 1987 Ballon d'Or =

Annual association football award event in France

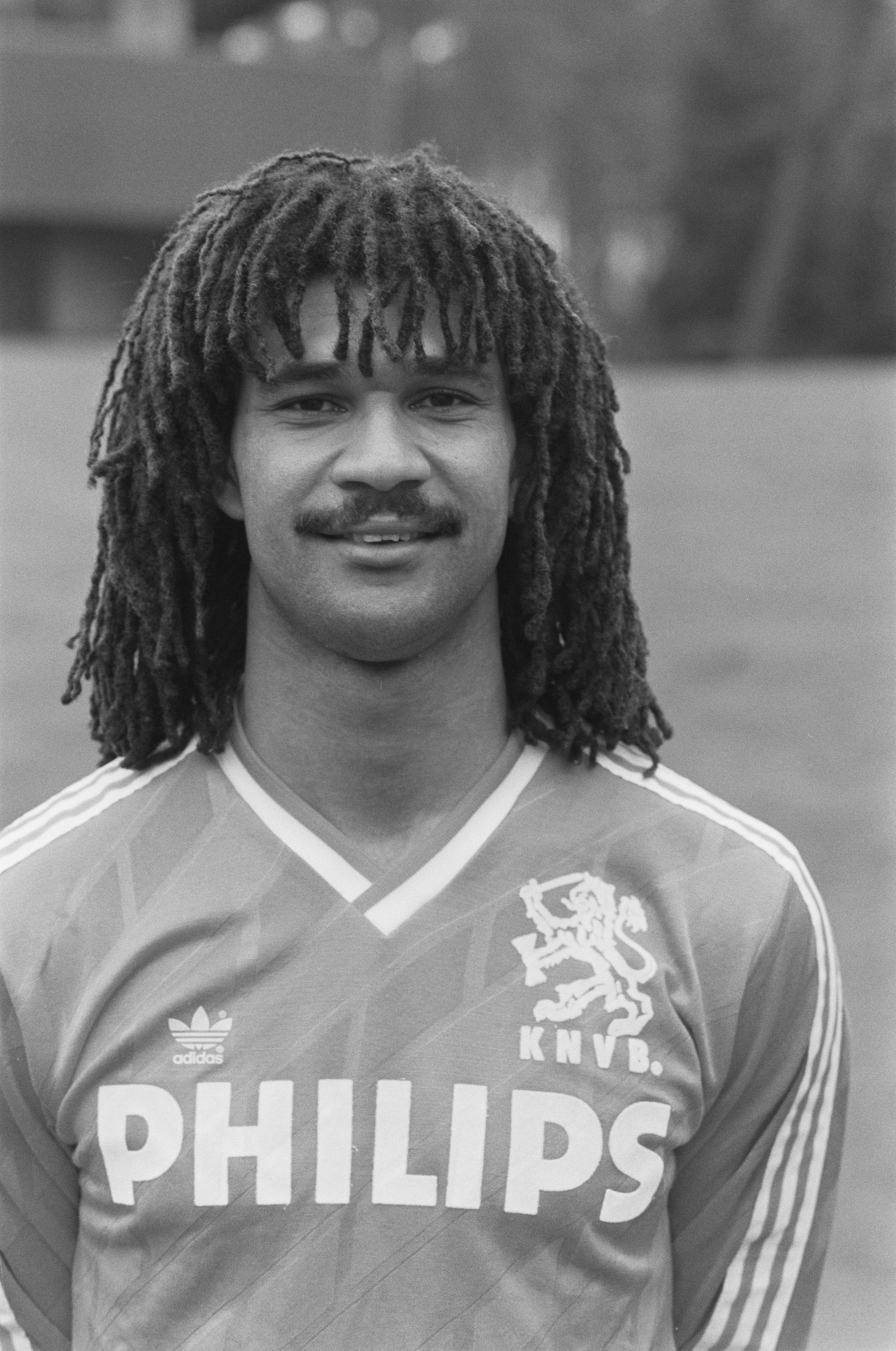
- 1987 Ballon d'Or winner, Ruud Gullit
- Date: 29 December 1987
- Presented by: France Football

Highlights
- Won by: (Netherlands) Ruud Gullit (1st award)
- Website: ballondor.com

The 1987 Ballon d'Or, given to the best football player in Europe as judged by a panel of sports journalists from UEFA member countries, was awarded to Ruud Gullit on 29 December 1987.

== Rankings ==
Rank	Name	Club(s)	Nationality	Points
1	Ruud Gullit	(Italy) Milan	Netherlands	106
2	Paulo Futre	(Portugal) Porto (Spain) Atlético Madrid	Portugal	91
3	Emilio Butragueño	(Spain) Real Madrid	Spain	61
4	Míchel	(Spain) Real Madrid	Spain	29
5	Gary Lineker	(Spain) Barcelona	England	13
6	John Barnes	(England) Liverpool	England	10
6	Marco van Basten	(Italy) Milan	Netherlands	10
8	Gianluca Vialli	(Italy) Sampdoria	Italy	9
9	Bryan Robson	(England) Manchester United	England	7
10	Klaus Allofs	(France) Marseille	West Germany	6
10	Glenn Hysén	(Italy) Fiorentina	Sweden	6
12	Manuel Amoros	(France) Monaco	France	5
12	Lothar Matthäus	(West Germany) Bayern Munich	West Germany	5
14	Mark Hateley	(France) Monaco	England	4
14	Toni Polster	(Italy) Torino	Austria	4
14	Ian Rush	(Italy) Juventus	Wales	4
17	Pierre Littbarski	(West Germany) 1. FC Köln	West Germany	3
17	Paul McGrath	(England) Manchester United	Republic of Ireland	3
17	Jean-Marie Pfaff	(West Germany) Bayern Munich	Belgium	3
17	Oleksandr Zavarov	(Soviet Union) Dynamo Kyiv	Soviet Union	3
21	Peter Beardsley	(England) Liverpool	England	2
21	Józef Młynarczyk	(Portugal) Porto	Poland	2
21	Rinat Dasayev	(Soviet Union) Spartak Moscow	Soviet Union	2
21	Preben Elkjær	(Italy) Hellas Verona	Denmark	2
21	Gheorghe Hagi	(Romania) Steaua București	Romania	2
21	Heinz Hermann	(Switzerland) Neuchâtel Xamax	Switzerland	2
21	Ally McCoist	(Scotland) Rangers	Scotland	2
21	Rodion Cămătaru	(Romania) Dinamo București	Romania	2
21	Peter Shilton	(England) Derby County	England	2
30	Alessandro Altobelli	(Italy) Internazionale	Italy	1
30	Glenn Hoddle	(France) Monaco	England	1
30	Sokol Kushta	(Albania) Flamurtari	Albania	1
30	Dimitris Saravakos	(Greece) Panathinaikos	Greece	1
30	Rudi Völler	(Italy) Roma	West Germany	1

Source: http://www.francefootball.fr/Ballon Or 1987
