= Luciano De Paola =

Italian football manager

Personal information
- Date of birth: 30 May 1961 (age 65)
- Place of birth: Crotone, Italy
- Position: Midfielder

Senior career*
Years	Team	Apps	(Gls)
1981–1983	Crotone	59	(0)
1983–1985	Frosinone	64	(0)
1985–1988	Francavilla	85	(1)
1988–1990	Cagliari	71	(2)
1990–1993	Brescia	85	(2)
1993	Lazio	6	(0)
1993–1994	Atalanta	14	(0)
1994–1996	Cosenza	66	(2)
1996–1998	Brescia	66	(0)
1998–1999	Cremapergo	13	(0)

Managerial career
- 1999: Cremapergo
- 2007: Arezzo
- 2009–2011: Darfo
- 2011–2012: Seregno
- 2012–2013: Trento
- 2013–2014: AlzanoCene
- 2015: Piacenza
- 2015–2016: Lecco
- 2016–2017: Lumezzane
- 2017: Lecco
- 2017–2018: Pergolettese
- 2018–2019: Trento
- 2019–2020: Savona
- 2020–2021: Pergolettese
- 2021–2022: Lecco
- 2022–2023: Città di Varese
- * Club domestic league appearances and goals

Luciano De Paola (born 30 May 1961 in Italy) is an Italian football manager and former player.

== Playing career ==
As a player, De Paola was compared to Italian international Gennaro Gattuso, who was also a defensive midfielder. In 2013, the newspaper Corriere della Sera included De Paola in a list of Brescia Calcio's best defensive midfielders.

Upon signing for Cagliari Calcio in 1988, De Paola was interviewed by Guerin Sportivo, where the author wrote that he voted for the Italian Communist Party in the early 1980s. When he joined S.S. Lazio in 1993, a journalist re-published the interview and labelled him a communist. As a result, he was blamed for the team's problems and was eventually forced to leave due to pressure from the club's supporters.

After retirement, De Paola claimed that he had never talked about politics in any interview and was never interested in it.

== Coaching career ==
De Paola mostly worked as head coach in the minor leagues of Northern Italy. His most recent, in charge of Serie C club Pergolettese, ended on 13 April 2021 after he was sacked due to poor results. On 25 November 2021, he was hired as new head coach of Lecco. He rescinded his contract with Lecco on 11 May 2022, a few days after the end of the season.

He subsequently worked at Serie D club Città di Varese until February 2023.
