= Angelo Carbone =

Italian footballer (born 1968)

Personal information
- Date of birth: 23 March 1968 (age 58)
- Place of birth: Bari, Italy
- Position: Midfielder

Senior career*
| Years | Team | Apps | (Gls) |
| 1988–1990 | Bari | 33 | (2) |
| 1990–1991 | AC Milan | 21 | (0) |
| 1991–1992 | Bari | 52 | (1) |
| 1992–1993 | Napoli | 27 | (0) |
| 1993–1994 | AC Milan | 9 | (0) |
| 1994–1995 | Fiorentina | 27 | (4) |
| 1995–1996 | Piacenza | 30 | (2) |
| 1996 | Reggiana | 6 | (0) |
| 1996–1999 | Atalanta | 47 | (0) |
| 1999 | Reggiana | 17 | (1) |
| 1999–2000 | Pistoiese | 16 | (6) |
| 2000–2001 | Ternana | 8 | (1) |
| 2001–2003 | Pistoiese | 27 | (1) |
| 2003–2005 | Pro Patria | 48 | (4) |
| Total | | 368 | (22) |
- * Club domestic league appearances and goals

Angelo Carbone (born 23 March 1968) is an Italian former footballer who played as a midfielder.

== Career ==
=== Club ===
Carbone had a much travelled career, playing for ten different clubs. He began his youth career with Bari, making his professional debut with the club in Serie B during the 1988–89 season, earning promotion to Serie A. During his first season in Serie A, he broke into the starting line-up, making 26 appearances and scoring a goal against Inter at the San Siro stadium. In 1990, he moved to Milan at the request of manager Arrigo Sacchi. During his first season with the club, he made 21 appearances in Serie A, making his club debut on 9 September 1990, in a 1–0 home win over Genoa in Serie A. He also made his UEFA Champions League debut, scoring a goal against Club Bruges, and he started in Milan's European Supercup and Intercontinental Cup victories in 1990.

The following season, under Milan's new manager Fabio Capello, Carbone was sent out on loan to several clubs. He was first sent out back to Bari, although the club were later relegated to Serie B, and he later transferred to Napoli. He returned to Milan during the 1993–94 season, where he only made 9 appearances, although he achieved his greatest club successes, winning the Serie A title, and the UEFA Champions League in 1994. He made his last appearance with Milan in Serie A on 1 May 1994, in a 1–0 home loss to Reggiana, and was subsequently loaned to Fiorentina during the 1994–95 season. He was later sold to Piacenza for approximately 2 billion Lit., where he helped to save the club from relegation during the 1995–96 season, also notably scoring a decisive goal in a 1–0 victory over Inter.

The following season he moved to newly promoted Reggiana for a few months in 1996, and he later moved to Atalanta, where he remained for two and a half seasons, making few appearances, as the club were relegated in 1998. In January 1999, he moved back to Reggiana, in Serie B, helping the club to avoid relegation. He later moved to Pistoiese for the 1999–2000 season, scoring 6 goals in 16 matches, helping to save the club from relegation in the play-off against Cesena. He temporarily moved to Ternana in 2000 before returning to Pistoiese in January 2001, where he remained until 2002. Later that year, he joined Pro Patria in Serie C1, where he ended his career in 2005.

=== International ===
Although he never officially represented Italy at the senior level, Carbone represented the Italy national under-21 football team on 8 occasions between 1989 and 1990, taking part in the 1990 UEFA European Under-21 Championship under manager Cesare Maldini, where Italy finished in third place. He received his first and only call-up for Italy in 1992, making his debut in an unofficial friendly against Zurig on 23 September.

== After retirement ==
After retiring, Carbone became a sporting director for Pro Patria, and later a scout for Milan.

== Honours ==
Bari

- Mitropa Cup: 1990

Milan

- Serie A: 1993–94
- UEFA Champions League: 1993–94
- UEFA Super Cup: 1990
- Intercontinental Cup: 1990
