= Giandomenico De Marchis =

Italian sculptor

- Born: 24 October 1893; Villadeati, Italy
- Died: 13 July 1967 (aged 73)
- Occupation: Sculptor

Giandomenico De Marchis (24 October 1893 – 13 July 1967) was an Italian sculptor. His work was part of the sculpture event in the art competition at the 1936 Summer Olympics.
