= 1979–80 Eredivisie =

24th season of the Eredivisie

Eredivisie
- Season: 1979–80
- Champions: AFC Ajax (19th title)
- Promoted: Willem II; SBV Excelsior
- Relegated: Vitesse Arnhem; HFC Haarlem
- European Cup: AFC Ajax
- Cup Winners' Cup: Feyenoord
- UEFA Cup: AZ '67; PSV Eindhoven; FC Utrecht; FC Twente
- Goals: 883
- Average goals/game: 2.88
- Top goalscorer: (Netherlands) Kees Kist; AZ '67 27 goals

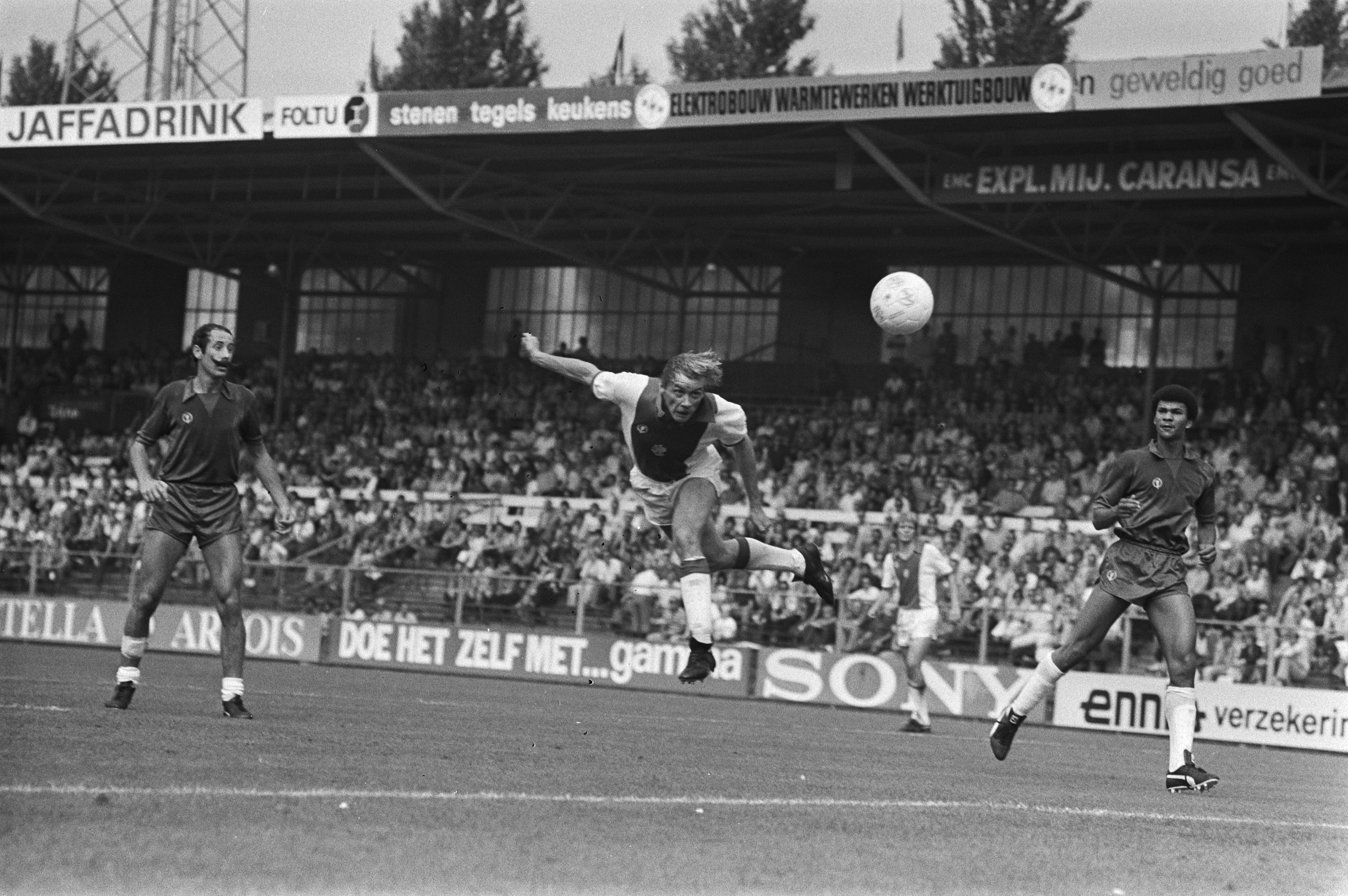
Dutch football match Ajax Amsterdam - HFC Haarlem, 1-1-. Schoenacker scores while in offside position. Right: Haarlem player Ruud Gullit. Left: Abe van den Ban (Haarlem), known for his special moustache, Sept. 1979

The Dutch Eredivisie in the 1979–80 season was contested by 18 teams. Ajax won the championship.

== League standings ==
Pos	Team	Pld	W	D	L	GF	GA	GD	Pts	Qualification or relegation
1	AFC Ajax	34	22	6	6	77	41	+36	50	Qualified for 1980–81 European Cup
2	AZ '67	34	20	7	7	77	36	+41	47	Qualified for 1980–81 UEFA Cup
3	PSV Eindhoven	34	18	8	8	66	37	+29	44	Qualified for 1980–81 UEFA Cup
4	Feyenoord	34	15	13	6	58	36	+22	43	Qualified for 1980–81 European Cup Winners' Cup
5	FC Utrecht	34	14	11	9	49	35	+14	39	Qualified for 1980–81 UEFA Cup
6	FC Twente	34	16	7	11	49	41	+8	39	Qualified for 1980–81 UEFA Cup
7	Roda JC	34	14	8	12	51	49	+2	36	
8	Willem II	34	11	12	11	43	63	−20	34	
9	SBV Excelsior	34	10	11	13	56	60	−4	31	
10	FC Den Haag	34	11	9	14	38	43	−5	31	
11	MVV Maastricht	34	10	11	13	46	53	−7	31	
12	Go Ahead Eagles	34	12	6	16	51	52	−1	30	
13	Sparta Rotterdam	34	10	7	17	45	55	−10	27	
14	PEC Zwolle	34	9	9	16	36	47	−11	27	
15	NEC	34	11	5	18	33	50	−17	27	
16	NAC	34	10	7	17	35	59	−24	27	
17	Vitesse Arnhem	34	6	13	15	35	59	−24	25	Relegated to Eerste Divisie
18	HFC Haarlem	34	7	10	17	38	67	−29	24	Relegated to Eerste Divisie

Source: rsssf.com

== Results ==
Home \ Away	AJA	AZ	EXC	FEY	GAE	DHA	HFC	MVV	NAC	NEC	PEC	PSV	RJC	SPA	TWE	UTR	VIT	WIL
Ajax		2–2	6–0	1–1	2–1	3–0	1–1	3–6	2–1	3–0	2–0	4–1	4–0	1–0	3–2	3–2	3–0	7–1
AZ '67	2–3		1–0	0–0	2–0	2–1	2–0	5–1	7–0	3–0	5–0	2–1	2–2	2–1	2–0	1–0	2–1	3–1
Excelsior	2–2	1–5		0–2	2–1	1–1	1–2	0–0	4–2	4–0	3–1	1–2	1–1	3–1	2–2	1–1	2–0	1–2
Feyenoord	4–0	3–1	0–4		1–1	2–1	1–1	1–1	3–1	2–1	2–0	0–3	1–1	3–1	1–1	3–0	0–0	5–1
Go Ahead Eagles	0–1	2–1	0–2	1–1		1–0	2–1	1–1	4–0	0–1	0–0	2–1	1–2	1–0	1–2	0–0	5–1	3–0
FC Den Haag	1–0	1–0	1–2	2–2	2–4		2–1	1–1	3–0	2–0	2–0	2–3	2–0	2–0	2–1	2–1	2–0	0–0
Haarlem	1–3	0–3	1–5	0–2	2–3	1–1		2–2	1–0	2–1	1–1	1–4	1–3	5–3	0–0	0–2	3–1	3–1
MVV	0–2	1–2	3–1	2–1	3–3	2–0	4–1		3–2	0–2	0–1	2–1	4–1	1–3	1–0	0–0	2–2	0–1
NAC	0–1	0–3	1–1	3–2	1–0	1–0	1–0	0–0		1–0	2–1	2–4	3–0	2–1	1–0	0–0	2–2	0–1
N.E.C.	0–3	1–0	2–2	0–2	0–3	1–0	0–0	2–1	1–1		4–1	2–0	2–0	3–1	0–3	3–1	1–0	2–3
PEC Zwolle	3–0	1–1	4–2	0–2	2–1	3–1	3–0	1–2	3–0	1–0		1–2	0–0	0–1	0–1	2–2	2–1	2–2
PSV	1–1	1–1	1–1	2–2	3–2	1–1	5–0	2–0	2–0	1–0	0–0		0–1	1–0	7–1	3–0	1–1	3–0
Roda JC	2–1	1–2	1–1	1–0	3–1	5–1	1–2	4–0	2–1	2–0	2–1	1–3		2–2	3–0	1–3	2–1	1–2
Sparta Rotterdam	3–4	3–3	3–1	0–4	2–1	2–2	3–0	1–0	1–1	0–0	1–0	1–2	1–0		1–0	1–1	1–2	4–0
FC Twente '65	1–0	4–1	2–1	3–0	3–1	2–0	2–2	3–1	1–4	2–1	1–0	2–1	1–1	2–0		0–1	4–1	0–0
FC Utrecht	1–2	3–2	3–0	1–1	4–0	0–0	1–0	2–0	1–1	3–1	3–1	2–1	0–2	3–1	0–0		4–0	2–2
Vitesse	1–1	1–1	3–3	1–3	3–5	1–0	1–1	1–1	2–0	0–0	0–0	0–2	1–1	2–1	1–3	1–0		3–1
Willem II	1–3	0–6	3–1	1–1	3–0	0–0	2–2	1–1	3–1	3–2	1–1	1–1	4–2	1–1	1–0	0–2	0–0	

Source: rsssf.com
Legend: Blue = home team win; Yellow = draw; Red = away team win.

== See also ==
- 1979–80 Eerste Divisie
- 1979–80 KNVB Cup
