= Giuseppe Romano =

Italian footballer

Personal information
- Date of birth: November 15, 1918
- Place of birth: Brescia, Italy
- Date of death: November 16, 1965 (aged 47)
- Place of death: Tempio Pausania
- Position: Goalkeeper

Senior career*
Years	Team	Apps	(Gls)
1937–1942	Brescia	125	(0)
1942–1943	Vicenza	24	(0)
1944–1945	Como	20	(0)
1945–1947	Vicenza	60	(0)
1947–1949	Brescia	82	(0)
1949–1951	Como	2	(0)
1951–1954	Torino	52	(0)
1954–1955	Lecco	10	(0)
1955–1956	Piacenza	9	(0)
1956–1957	Juventus	6	(0)
- * Club domestic league appearances and goals

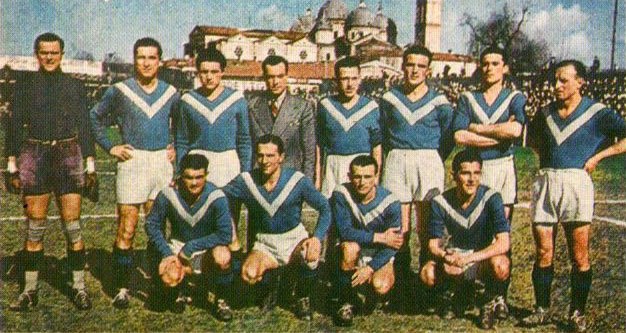
A line-up of A.C. Brescia in the 1940–41 season. From left to right, standing: G. Romano, A. Gadaldi, I. Rebuzzi (II), E. Frisoni (coach), R. Gei, A. Buzzoni, R. Di Cuonzo, M. Bergamaschi; crouched: F. Scaramelli, G. Moretti, C. Albini, B. Barbieri.

Giuseppe Romano (November 15, 1918 – November 16, 1965) was an Italian professional football player. Born in Brescia, he was the oldest player ever to play for Juventus FC, at 38 years, 138 days of age. He was born Brescia, Italy. From 1962 to 1963 he was the coach of Pordenone Calcio, and later became the coach of A.S.D Tempio in 1965. He died in Tempio Pausania, Italy.

== Career ==
=== Player ===
Romano made his Serie B debut with Brescia on May 22, 1938 in the Brescia-Vigevano match. He remained within the Rondinelle until 1942, when he transferred to L.R. Vicenza, where he made his Serie A debut on October 4, 1942 in the 6-1 defeat at the hands of Genoa C.F.C.

During the Second World War the championships were suspended. Romano moved to Como, where he took part in the Lombard Charity Tournament. The Larian team finished in the first place, and Romano was the least beaten goalkeeper of the tournament, with 18 goals conceded. After the war, he resumed his career playing two more championships with Vicenza (The second in Serie A), before returning to Brescia for two seasons as a starter in the junior division.

In 1949 Romano returned to Como, where he served as a backup and collected 2 appearances in two seasons. At the age of 33, he moved to Torino, and made his debut in the grenade shirt on November 18, 1951, in the 1-0 victory in Trieste, winning the starting shirt and playing 29 games in the 1951–52 Championship. At age 36, he went down to Serie C with the Lecco. He played 10 games as a reserve for the owner Maffeis.

In April 1956, after several months of inactivity, Romano was hired by Piacenza, becoming the fourth goalkeeper employed by the Emilians in the 1955–56 Serie C. He played the last 9 games of the championship, contributing to the salvation of the team coached by Ercole Bodini.

Romano's career continued with his last season in Serie A, in the ranks of Juventus, as the third goalkeeper behind Giovanni Viola and Giuseppe Vavassori. He played 6 games and ended his career on June 2, 1957, on the field of Padova.

=== Coach ===
After his competitive career he became coach of Pordenone, in the 1962–63 Serie C, and in 1965 he was hired by Tempio. In November of the same year, while he was directing a team training session, he died of a heart attack.
