= 1980–81 Eerste Divisie =

25th season of the second-tier football league in Netherlands

Eerste Divisie
- Season: 1980–81
- Champions: HFC Haarlem
- Promoted: HFC Haarlem; De Graafschap
- Goals: 977
- Average goals/game: 2.85

The Dutch Eerste Divisie in the 1980–81 season was contested by 19 teams. HFC Haarlem won the championship.

== New entrants ==
Relegated from the 1979–80 Eredivisie

- HFC Haarlem
- Vitesse Arnhem

== League standings ==
Pos	Team	Pld	W	D	L	GF	GA	GD	Pts	Promotion or qualification
1	HFC Haarlem	36	24	6	6	78	25	+53	54	Promoted to Eredivisie.
2	sc Heerenveen	36	18	10	8	68	41	+27	46	Qualified for Promotion play-off as Period champions.
3	FC Volendam	36	17	12	7	68	49	+19	46	
4	Fortuna Sittard	36	18	7	11	65	50	+15	43	
5	DS '79	36	17	8	11	64	49	+15	42	Qualified for Promotion play-off as Period champions.
6	FC Den Bosch	36	17	8	11	46	41	+5	42	Qualified for Promotion play-off as Period champions.
7	De Graafschap	36	15	11	10	55	43	+12	41	Qualified for Promotion play-off as Period champions.
8	Vitesse Arnhem	36	14	10	12	55	58	−3	38	
9	SC Cambuur	36	13	10	13	46	38	+8	36	
10	FC Eindhoven	36	12	12	12	47	44	+3	36	
11	Telstar	36	12	11	13	43	56	−13	35	
12	Helmond Sport	36	11	12	13	45	45	0	34	
13	VVV-Venlo	36	14	5	17	68	74	−6	33	
14	SVV	36	10	13	13	35	47	−12	33	
15	SC Veendam	36	11	9	16	53	65	−12	31	
16	FC Amsterdam	36	9	11	16	45	62	−17	29	
17	SC Amersfoort	36	7	9	20	30	59	−29	23	
18	FC Vlaardingen	36	6	10	20	31	59	−28	22	Withdrew owing to bankruptcy.
19	SC Heracles	36	7	6	23	35	72	−37	20	

Source: rsssf.com

== Promotion competition ==
In the promotion competition, four period winners (the best teams during each of the four quarters of the regular competition) played for promotion to the eredivisie.

Pos	Team	Pld	W	D	L	GF	GA	GD	Pts	Promotion
1	De Graafschap	6	3	2	1	8	5	+3	8	Promoted to Eredivisie.
2	sc Heerenveen	6	2	3	1	9	7	+2	7	
3	FC Den Bosch	6	2	2	2	10	9	+1	6	
4	DS '79	6	1	1	4	9	15	−6	3	

Source: rsssf.com

== Attendances ==
#	Club	Average
1	Dordrecht	5,111
2	Fortuna	4,806
3	Heerenveen	4,756
4	Cambuur	4,739
5	Haarlem	4,122
6	De Graafschap	3,511
7	Vitesse	3,272
8	Helmond	3,217
9	Volendam	3,122
10	Eindhoven	3,017
11	Veendam	2,917
12	Den Bosch	2,700
13	SVV	2,344
14	Telstar	2,300
15	VVV	2,234
16	Amersfoort	2,222
17	Heracles	2,183
18	Vlaardingen	1,289
19	Amsterdam	1,190

== See also ==
- 1980–81 Eredivisie
- 1980–81 KNVB Cup
