= Giandomenico Costi =

Italian footballer

Personal information
- Date of birth: 10 March 1969 (age 57)
- Place of birth: Sassuolo, Italy
- Height: 1.82 m (6 ft 0 in)
- Position: Defender

Team information
- Current team: Carpi (assistant)

Senior career*
Years	Team	Apps	(Gls)
1985–1990	Modena	76	(1)
1990–1991	Milan	2	(0)
1991	Messina	0	(0)
1991–1992	Venezia	24	(0)
1992–1995	Lucchese	82	(0)
1995–1996	Brescia	14	(0)
1996–1997	Siena	14	(0)
1997–1998	Alessandria	20	(0)
1998–1999	Ancona	10	(0)
Total		242	(1)

Managerial career
- 2010–2011: Carpi (assistant)
- 2011: Carpi (caretaker)
- 2013: Carpi (assistant)
- 2014–: Carpi (assistant)
- * Club domestic league appearances and goals

Giandomenico Costi (born 10 March 1969, in Sassuolo) is a retired Italian professional footballer who played as a defender.

== Career ==
Costi played for several Italian clubs throughout his career; he most notably played 2 games in the Italian Serie A for A.C. Milan during the 1990–91 season.

== Honours ==
Milan

- UEFA Super Cup winner: 1990.
- Intercontinental Cup winner: 1990.
